= 2025 GT World Challenge Europe =

12th season of the GT World Challenge Europe

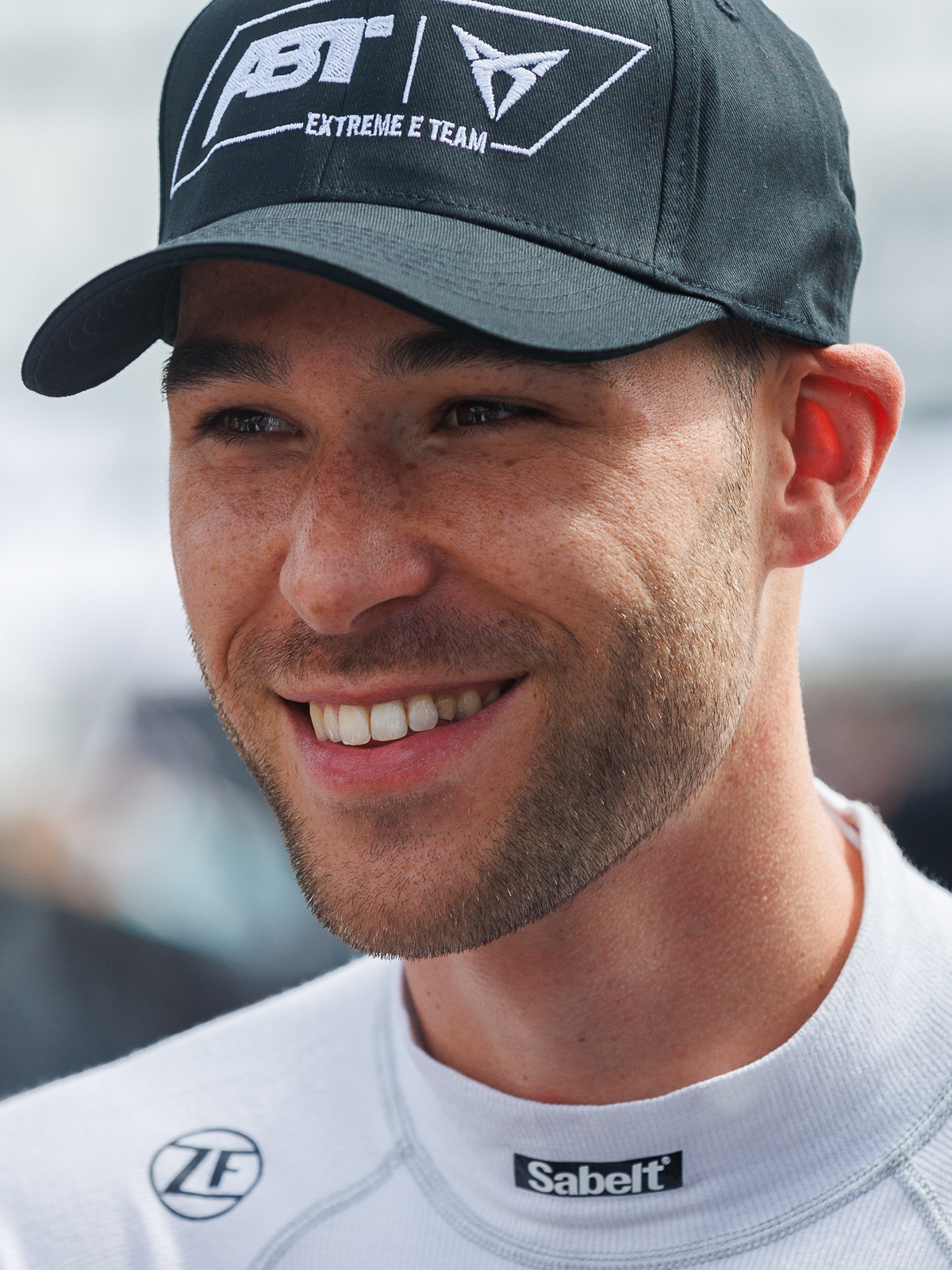
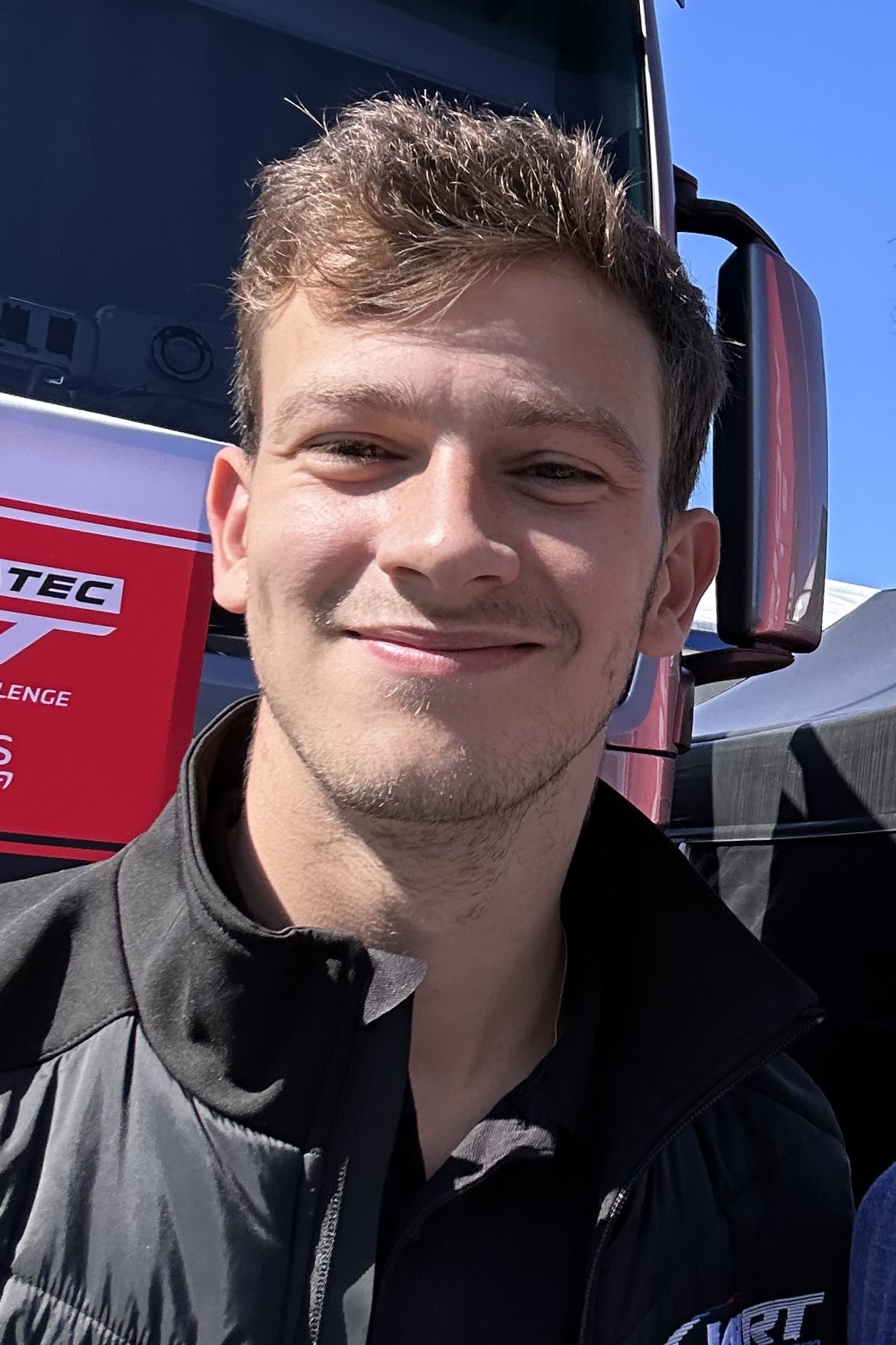
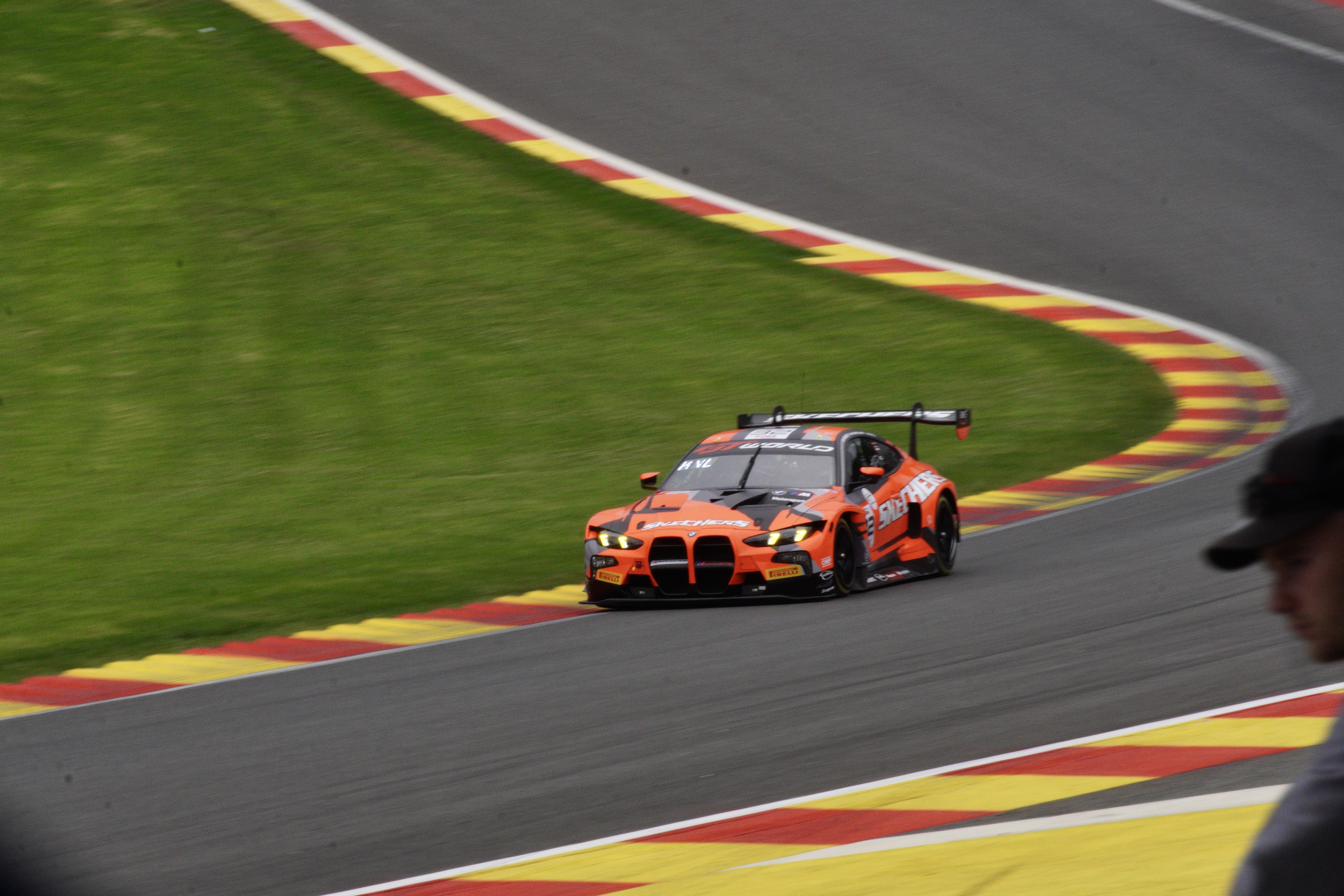
Kelvin van der Linde and Charles Weerts won the drivers' championship, while their team Team WRT won the teams' championship.

The 2025 GT World Challenge Europe Powered by AWS was a motor racing championship for GT3 cars, marking the 12th edition of the GT World Challenge Europe. Organised by the SRO Motorsports Group, it formed the European part of the broader GT World Challenge, which also includes GT World Challenge America, GT World Challenge Australia and GT World Challenge Asia.

The championship split into the Endurance Cup and the Sprint Cup, each with their own respective titles, alongside the overall GT World Challenge Europe championship. The season took place over ten rounds at various European circuits. The annual season prologue, which acted as the championship's pre-season testing, took place between 10 and 11 March, with testing for the 24 Hours of Spa occurring between 13 and 14 May. Racing commenced in April and concluded in October.

== Calendar ==
All Sprint Cup rounds consisted of two one-hour races, totalling 15 races throughout the season, alongside the single 3-hour (Monza, Nürburgring and Barcelona), 6-hour (Paul Ricard), or 24-hour (Spa) races in the Endurance Cup rounds.

Round	Circuit	Date	Series	Map
1	(France) Circuit Paul Ricard	11–13 April	Endurance	2025 GT World Challenge Europe is located in Europe
2	(United Kingdom) Brands Hatch	3–4 May	Sprint	2025 GT World Challenge Europe is located in Europe
3	(Netherlands) Circuit Zandvoort	16–18 May	Sprint	2025 GT World Challenge Europe is located in Europe
4	(Italy) Monza Circuit	30 May – 1 June	Endurance	2025 GT World Challenge Europe is located in Europe
5	(Belgium) Circuit de Spa-Francorchamps	26–29 June	Endurance	2025 GT World Challenge Europe is located in Europe
6	(Italy) Misano World Circuit Marco Simoncelli	18–20 July	Sprint	2025 GT World Challenge Europe is located in Europe
7	(France) Circuit de Nevers Magny-Cours	1–3 August	Sprint	2025 GT World Challenge Europe is located in Europe
8	(Germany) Nürburgring	29–31 August	Endurance	2025 GT World Challenge Europe is located in Europe
9	(Spain) Circuit Ricardo Tormo	19–21 September	Sprint	2025 GT World Challenge Europe is located in Europe
10	(Spain) Circuit de Barcelona-Catalunya	10–12 October	Endurance	2025 GT World Challenge Europe is located in Europe

=== Calendar changes ===
The 2025 calendar saw Circuit Paul Ricard return to the popular weekend format of a 6-hour endurance race to open the season. The championship used this format between 2015 and 2023, and it acted as the season opener.

Circuit Zandvoort and Circuit Ricardo Tormo also returned to the calendar after a one-year absence. Notably, the Jeddah Corniche Circuit did not return in 2025, being replaced by Circuit de Barcelona-Catalunya as the season closer, which reverted to the Endurance Cup. Additionally, Hockenheim did not host a round in 2025.

== Entries ==
=== Sprint Cup ===
Bronze Cup entries did not compete at the Brands Hatch round and instead began their Sprint Cup season at Misano World Circuit, the second round of the Sprint Cup and the third round of the season.

Team	Car	Engine	No.	Class	Drivers	Rounds
(Austria) GRT - Grasser Racing Team	Lamborghini Huracán GT3 Evo 2	Lamborghini DGF 5.2 L V10	1	B	(Bulgaria) Georgi Donczew	3, 6, 9
(Austria) GRT - Grasser Racing Team	Lamborghini Huracán GT3 Evo 2	Lamborghini DGF 5.2 L V10	1	B	(Germany) Christian Engelhart	3, 6, 9
(Austria) GRT - Grasser Racing Team	Lamborghini Huracán GT3 Evo 2	Lamborghini DGF 5.2 L V10	19	S	Ivan Ekelchik	All
(Austria) GRT - Grasser Racing Team	Lamborghini Huracán GT3 Evo 2	Lamborghini DGF 5.2 L V10	19	S	(Belgium) Baptiste Moulin	All
(Austria) GRT - Grasser Racing Team	Lamborghini Huracán GT3 Evo 2	Lamborghini DGF 5.2 L V10	63	P	(Germany) Luca Engstler	All
(Austria) GRT - Grasser Racing Team	Lamborghini Huracán GT3 Evo 2	Lamborghini DGF 5.2 L V10	63	P	(South Africa) Jordan Pepper	All
(Belgium) Boutsen VDS	Mercedes-AMG GT3 Evo	Mercedes-AMG M159 6.2 L V8	9	P	(Belgium) Maxime Martin	All
(Belgium) Boutsen VDS	Mercedes-AMG GT3 Evo	Mercedes-AMG M159 6.2 L V8	9	P	(Germany) Luca Stolz	All
(Belgium) Boutsen VDS	Mercedes-AMG GT3 Evo	Mercedes-AMG M159 6.2 L V8	10	S	(France) César Gazeau	All
(Belgium) Boutsen VDS	Mercedes-AMG GT3 Evo	Mercedes-AMG M159 6.2 L V8	10	S	(France) Aurélien Panis	All
(Belgium) Comtoyou Racing	Aston Martin Vantage AMR GT3 Evo	Aston Martin M177 4.0 L Turbo V8	11	S	Rodrigo Almeida	9
(Belgium) Comtoyou Racing	Aston Martin Vantage AMR GT3 Evo	Aston Martin M177 4.0 L Turbo V8	11	S	(United Kingdom) Jessica Hawkins	9
(Belgium) Comtoyou Racing	Aston Martin Vantage AMR GT3 Evo	Aston Martin M177 4.0 L Turbo V8	21	S	(United Arab Emirates) Jamie Day	All
(Belgium) Comtoyou Racing	Aston Martin Vantage AMR GT3 Evo	Aston Martin M177 4.0 L Turbo V8	21	S	(Belgium) Kobe Pauwels	All
(Belgium) Comtoyou Racing	Aston Martin Vantage AMR GT3 Evo	Aston Martin M177 4.0 L Turbo V8	270	B	(Brazil) Ricardo Baptista	3, 6–7, 9
(Belgium) Comtoyou Racing	Aston Martin Vantage AMR GT3 Evo	Aston Martin M177 4.0 L Turbo V8	270	B	(Brazil) Rafael Suzuki	3, 7, 9
(Belgium) Comtoyou Racing	Aston Martin Vantage AMR GT3 Evo	Aston Martin M177 4.0 L Turbo V8	270	B	(Brazil) Sérgio Sette Câmara	6
(Switzerland) Emil Frey Racing	Ferrari 296 GT3	Ferrari F163CE 3.0 L Turbo V6	14	P	(United Kingdom) Ben Green	All
(Switzerland) Emil Frey Racing	Ferrari 296 GT3	Ferrari F163CE 3.0 L Turbo V6	14	P	(Finland) Konsta Lappalainen	All
(Switzerland) Emil Frey Racing	Ferrari 296 GT3	Ferrari F163CE 3.0 L Turbo V6	69	G	(United Kingdom) Chris Lulham	All
(Switzerland) Emil Frey Racing	Ferrari 296 GT3	Ferrari F163CE 3.0 L Turbo V6	69	G	(Netherlands) Thierry Vermeulen	All
(United Kingdom) Steller Motorsport	Chevrolet Corvette Z06 GT3.R	Chevrolet LT6.R 5.5 L V8	24	S	(Belgium) Matisse Lismont	2–3
(United Kingdom) Steller Motorsport	Chevrolet Corvette Z06 GT3.R	Chevrolet LT6.R 5.5 L V8	24	S	(Finland) Jesse Salmenautio	2–3
(France) Saintéloc Racing	Audi R8 LMS Evo II	Audi DAR 5.2 L V10	25	G	(France) Paul Evrard	All
(France) Saintéloc Racing	Audi R8 LMS Evo II	Audi DAR 5.2 L V10	25	G	(Belgium) Gilles Magnus	All
(France) Saintéloc Racing	Audi R8 LMS Evo II	Audi DAR 5.2 L V10	26	S	(Ukraine) Ivan Klymenko	All
(France) Saintéloc Racing	Audi R8 LMS Evo II	Audi DAR 5.2 L V10	26	S	(Belgium) Lorens Lecertua	All
(Qatar) QMMF by Saintéloc Racing	Audi R8 LMS Evo II	Audi DAR 5.2 L V10	27	B	(Qatar) Ibrahim Al-Abdulghani	3, 6–7
(Qatar) QMMF by Saintéloc Racing	Audi R8 LMS Evo II	Audi DAR 5.2 L V10	27	B	(Qatar) Ghanim Salah Al-Maadheed	3, 6–7
(Qatar) QMMF by Saintéloc Racing	Audi R8 LMS Evo II	Audi DAR 5.2 L V10	27	B	(Qatar) Abdulla Ali Al-Khelaifi	9
(Qatar) QMMF by Saintéloc Racing	Audi R8 LMS Evo II	Audi DAR 5.2 L V10	27	B	(Germany) Julian Hanses	9
(Belgium) Team WRT	BMW M4 GT3 Evo	BMW P58 3.0 L Twin Turbo I6	30	S	(Belgium) Gilles Stadsbader	All
(Belgium) Team WRT	BMW M4 GT3 Evo	BMW P58 3.0 L Twin Turbo I6	30	S	(Sweden) Gustav Bergström	2–3, 6–7
(Belgium) Team WRT	BMW M4 GT3 Evo	BMW P58 3.0 L Twin Turbo I6	30	S	(Belgium) Matisse Lismont	9
(Belgium) Team WRT	BMW M4 GT3 Evo	BMW P58 3.0 L Twin Turbo I6	32	P	(South Africa) Kelvin van der Linde	All
(Belgium) Team WRT	BMW M4 GT3 Evo	BMW P58 3.0 L Twin Turbo I6	32	P	(Belgium) Charles Weerts	All
(Belgium) Team WRT	BMW M4 GT3 Evo	BMW P58 3.0 L Twin Turbo I6	46	P	(Switzerland) Raffaele Marciello	6
(Belgium) Team WRT	BMW M4 GT3 Evo	BMW P58 3.0 L Twin Turbo I6	46	P	(Italy) Valentino Rossi	6
(Oman) AlManar Racing by WRT	BMW M4 GT3 Evo	BMW P58 3.0 L Twin Turbo I6	777	G	(Oman) Al Faisal Al Zubair	All
(Oman) AlManar Racing by WRT	BMW M4 GT3 Evo	BMW P58 3.0 L Twin Turbo I6	777	G	(Germany) Jens Klingmann	All
(Germany) Walkenhorst Motorsport	Aston Martin Vantage AMR GT3 Evo	Aston Martin M177 4.0 L Turbo V8	35	P	(Portugal) Henrique Chaves	All
(Germany) Walkenhorst Motorsport	Aston Martin Vantage AMR GT3 Evo	Aston Martin M177 4.0 L Turbo V8	35	P	(Ecuador) Mateo Villagomez	All
(Austria) Razoon - more than racing	Porsche 911 GT3 R (992)	Porsche M97/80 4.2 L Flat-6	41	P	(Austria) Klaus Bachler	6
(Austria) Razoon - more than racing	Porsche 911 GT3 R (992)	Porsche M97/80 4.2 L Flat-6	41	P	(Denmark) Simon Birch	6
(United States) Winward Racing	Mercedes-AMG GT3 Evo	Mercedes-AMG M159 6.2 L V8	48	P	(Austria) Lucas Auer	All
(United States) Winward Racing	Mercedes-AMG GT3 Evo	Mercedes-AMG M159 6.2 L V8	48	P	(Germany) Maro Engel	All
(United States) Winward Racing	Mercedes-AMG GT3 Evo	Mercedes-AMG M159 6.2 L V8	81	B	(Armenia) Rinat Salikhov (Note: Salikhov is Russian, but he competes under an Armenian licence as Russian national emblems were banned by the FIA following the Russian invasion of Ukraine.)	3, 6–7, 9
(United States) Winward Racing	Mercedes-AMG GT3 Evo	Mercedes-AMG M159 6.2 L V8	81	B	(Italy) Gabriele Piana	3, 6
(United States) Winward Racing	Mercedes-AMG GT3 Evo	Mercedes-AMG M159 6.2 L V8	81	B	(Germany) Marvin Dienst	7, 9
(Italy) AF Corse - Francorchamps Motors	Ferrari 296 GT3	Ferrari F163CE 3.0 L Turbo V6	50	P	(Monaco) Arthur Leclerc	All
(Italy) AF Corse - Francorchamps Motors	Ferrari 296 GT3	Ferrari F163CE 3.0 L Turbo V6	50	P	(France) Thomas Neubauer	All
(Italy) AF Corse - Francorchamps Motors	Ferrari 296 GT3	Ferrari F163CE 3.0 L Turbo V6	51	P	(Monaco) Vincent Abril	All
(Italy) AF Corse - Francorchamps Motors	Ferrari 296 GT3	Ferrari F163CE 3.0 L Turbo V6	51	P	(Italy) Alessio Rovera	All
(Italy) AF Corse - Francorchamps Motors	Ferrari 296 GT3	Ferrari F163CE 3.0 L Turbo V6	52	S	(Belgium) Jef Machiels	All
(Italy) AF Corse - Francorchamps Motors	Ferrari 296 GT3	Ferrari F163CE 3.0 L Turbo V6	52	S	(Argentina) Marcos Siebert	All
(United Kingdom) Ziggo Sport – Tempesta Racing	Ferrari 296 GT3	Ferrari F163CE 3.0 L Turbo V6	93	B	(Italy) Eddie Cheever III	3, 6–7, 9
(United Kingdom) Ziggo Sport – Tempesta Racing	Ferrari 296 GT3	Ferrari F163CE 3.0 L Turbo V6	93	B	(Italy) Marco Pulcini	3, 6–7, 9
(United Kingdom) Garage 59	McLaren 720S GT3 Evo	McLaren M840T 4.0 L Turbo V8	58	G	(Monaco) Louis Prette	All
(United Kingdom) Garage 59	McLaren 720S GT3 Evo	McLaren M840T 4.0 L Turbo V8	58	G	(United Kingdom) Thomas Fleming	6–7, 9
(United Kingdom) Garage 59	McLaren 720S GT3 Evo	McLaren M840T 4.0 L Turbo V8	58	G	(United Kingdom) Adam Smalley	2–3
(United Kingdom) Garage 59	McLaren 720S GT3 Evo	McLaren M840T 4.0 L Turbo V8	59	P	(Germany) Benjamin Goethe	All
(United Kingdom) Garage 59	McLaren 720S GT3 Evo	McLaren M840T 4.0 L Turbo V8	59	P	(Germany) Marvin Kirchhöfer	All
(Germany) HRT Ford Performance	Ford Mustang GT3	Ford Coyote 5.4 L V8	64	P	(France) Romain Andriolo	2–3, 6–7
(Germany) HRT Ford Performance	Ford Mustang GT3	Ford Coyote 5.4 L V8	64	P	(Germany) Jusuf Owega	2–3, 6–7
(Germany) Tresor Attempto Racing	Audi R8 LMS Evo II	Audi DAR 5.2 L V10	66	B	Andrey Mukovoz	3, 6–7, 9
(Germany) Tresor Attempto Racing	Audi R8 LMS Evo II	Audi DAR 5.2 L V10	66	B	(Luxembourg) Dylan Pereira	3, 6–7, 9
(Germany) Tresor Attempto Racing	Audi R8 LMS Evo II	Audi DAR 5.2 L V10	88	G	(Italy) Leonardo Moncini	All
(Germany) Tresor Attempto Racing	Audi R8 LMS Evo II	Audi DAR 5.2 L V10	88	G	(Denmark) Sebastian Øgaard	All
(Germany) Tresor Attempto Racing	Audi R8 LMS Evo II	Audi DAR 5.2 L V10	99	S	(Germany) Alex Aka	All
(Germany) Tresor Attempto Racing	Audi R8 LMS Evo II	Audi DAR 5.2 L V10	99	S	(Argentina) Ezequiel Pérez Companc	2–3, 6–7
(Germany) Tresor Attempto Racing	Audi R8 LMS Evo II	Audi DAR 5.2 L V10	99	S	Alexey Nesov	9
(Switzerland) Kessel Racing	Ferrari 296 GT3	Ferrari F163CE 3.0 L Turbo V6	74	B	(United States) Dustin Blattner	3, 6–7, 9
(Switzerland) Kessel Racing	Ferrari 296 GT3	Ferrari F163CE 3.0 L Turbo V6	74	B	(Germany) Dennis Marschall	3, 6–7, 9
(United Kingdom) Barwell Motorsport	Lamborghini Huracán GT3 Evo 2	Lamborghini DGF 5.2 L V10	76	S	(United States) Christian Bogle	2–3
(United Kingdom) Barwell Motorsport	Lamborghini Huracán GT3 Evo 2	Lamborghini DGF 5.2 L V10	76	S	(Canada) Daniel Ali	2
(United Kingdom) Barwell Motorsport	Lamborghini Huracán GT3 Evo 2	Lamborghini DGF 5.2 L V10	76	S	(United States) Bijoy Garg	3
(United Kingdom) Barwell Motorsport	Lamborghini Huracán GT3 Evo 2	Lamborghini DGF 5.2 L V10	76	G	(United States) Bijoy Garg	6–7
(United Kingdom) Barwell Motorsport	Lamborghini Huracán GT3 Evo 2	Lamborghini DGF 5.2 L V10	76	G	(United Kingdom) Ricky Collard	6–7
(United Kingdom) Barwell Motorsport	Lamborghini Huracán GT3 Evo 2	Lamborghini DGF 5.2 L V10	78	P	(United Kingdom) Hugo Cook	All
(United Kingdom) Barwell Motorsport	Lamborghini Huracán GT3 Evo 2	Lamborghini DGF 5.2 L V10	78	P	(United Kingdom) Sandy Mitchell	All
(Germany) Lionspeed GP	Porsche 911 GT3 R (992)	Porsche M97/80 4.2 L Flat-6	80	B	(Switzerland) Ricardo Feller	3, 6–7, 9
(Germany) Lionspeed GP	Porsche 911 GT3 R (992)	Porsche M97/80 4.2 L Flat-6	80	B	(Luxembourg) Gabriel Rindone	3, 6–7, 9
(Germany) Lionspeed GP	Porsche 911 GT3 R (992)	Porsche M97/80 4.2 L Flat-6	89	B	(Denmark) Bastian Buus	3, 6–7, 9
(Germany) Lionspeed GP	Porsche 911 GT3 R (992)	Porsche M97/80 4.2 L Flat-6	89	B	(Kuwait) Bashar Mardini	3, 6–7, 9
(Italy) Imperiale Racing	Lamborghini Huracán GT3 Evo 2	Lamborghini DGF 5.2 L V10	85	B	Dmitry Gvazava	3, 6–7, 9
(Italy) Imperiale Racing	Lamborghini Huracán GT3 Evo 2	Lamborghini DGF 5.2 L V10	85	B	(Italy) Loris Spinelli	3, 6–7, 9
(Germany) Rutronik Racing	Porsche 911 GT3 R (992)	Porsche M97/80 4.2 L Flat-6	96	P	(Germany) Sven Müller	All
(Germany) Rutronik Racing	Porsche 911 GT3 R (992)	Porsche M97/80 4.2 L Flat-6	96	P	(Switzerland) Patric Niederhauser	All
(Germany) Rutronik Racing	Porsche 911 GT3 R (992)	Porsche M97/80 4.2 L Flat-6	97	S	(Netherlands) Loek Hartog	All
(Germany) Rutronik Racing	Porsche 911 GT3 R (992)	Porsche M97/80 4.2 L Flat-6	97	S	(Sri Lanka) Eshan Pieris	All
(France) CSA Racing	McLaren 720S GT3 Evo	McLaren M840T 4.0 L Turbo V8	111	P	(France) Simon Gachet	2–3, 6–7
(France) CSA Racing	McLaren 720S GT3 Evo	McLaren M840T 4.0 L Turbo V8	111	P	(France) Jim Pla	2–3, 6–7
(France) CSA Racing	McLaren 720S GT3 Evo	McLaren M840T 4.0 L Turbo V8	111	G	(France) Simon Gachet	9
(France) CSA Racing	McLaren 720S GT3 Evo	McLaren M840T 4.0 L Turbo V8	111	G	(France) Loris Cabirou	9
(France) CSA Racing	McLaren 720S GT3 Evo	McLaren M840T 4.0 L Turbo V8	112	G	(France) Arthur Rougier	2
(France) CSA Racing	McLaren 720S GT3 Evo	McLaren M840T 4.0 L Turbo V8	112	G	(United Kingdom) James Kell	2
(France) CSA Racing	McLaren 720S GT3 Evo	McLaren M840T 4.0 L Turbo V8	112	B	(France) Arthur Rougier	3, 6–7
(France) CSA Racing	McLaren 720S GT3 Evo	McLaren M840T 4.0 L Turbo V8	112	B	(Spain) Isaac Tutumlu Lopez	3, 6–7
(Italy) UNX Racing	Porsche 911 GT3 R (992)	Porsche M97/80 4.2 L Flat-6	888	B	(United Arab Emirates) Mathieu Detry	6–7, 9
(Italy) UNX Racing	Porsche 911 GT3 R (992)	Porsche M97/80 4.2 L Flat-6	888	B	(United Arab Emirates) Fabian Duffieux	6–7, 9
(United Kingdom) Paradine Competition	BMW M4 GT3 Evo	BMW P58 3.0 L Twin Turbo I6	991	B	(United Kingdom) Darren Leung	3, 6–7, 9
(United Kingdom) Paradine Competition	BMW M4 GT3 Evo	BMW P58 3.0 L Twin Turbo I6	991	B	(United Kingdom) Dan Harper	6–7
(United Kingdom) Paradine Competition	BMW M4 GT3 Evo	BMW P58 3.0 L Twin Turbo I6	991	B	(Brazil) Augusto Farfus	3
(United Kingdom) Paradine Competition	BMW M4 GT3 Evo	BMW P58 3.0 L Twin Turbo I6	991	B	(United Kingdom) Jake Dennis	9
(United Kingdom) Paradine Competition	BMW M4 GT3 Evo	BMW P58 3.0 L Twin Turbo I6	992	S	(Netherlands) Mex Jansen	All
(United Kingdom) Paradine Competition	BMW M4 GT3 Evo	BMW P58 3.0 L Twin Turbo I6	992	S	(Netherlands) Maxime Oosten	All

Icon	Class
P	Pro (Overall)
G	Gold Cup
S	Silver Cup
B	Bronze Cup

=== Endurance Cup ===
Team	Car	Engine	No.	Class	Drivers	Rounds
(Japan) Goodsmile Racing	Mercedes-AMG GT3 Evo	Mercedes-AMG M159 6.2 L V8	0	P	(Japan) Tatsuya Kataoka	5
(Japan) Goodsmile Racing	Mercedes-AMG GT3 Evo	Mercedes-AMG M159 6.2 L V8	0	P	(Japan) Kamui Kobayashi	5
(Japan) Goodsmile Racing	Mercedes-AMG GT3 Evo	Mercedes-AMG M159 6.2 L V8	0	P	(Japan) Nobuteru Taniguchi	5
(Malaysia) Johor Motorsports JMR	Chevrolet Corvette Z06 GT3.R	Chevrolet LT6.R 5.5 L V8	2	B	(Malaysia) Prince Abu Bakar Ibrahim	5
(Malaysia) Johor Motorsports JMR	Chevrolet Corvette Z06 GT3.R	Chevrolet LT6.R 5.5 L V8	2	B	(Malaysia) H. H. Prince Jefri Ibrahim	5
(Malaysia) Johor Motorsports JMR	Chevrolet Corvette Z06 GT3.R	Chevrolet LT6.R 5.5 L V8	2	B	(Australia) Jordan Love	5
(Malaysia) Johor Motorsports JMR	Chevrolet Corvette Z06 GT3.R	Chevrolet LT6.R 5.5 L V8	2	B	(United Kingdom) Alexander Sims	5
(Germany) GetSpeed	Mercedes-AMG GT3 Evo	Mercedes-AMG M159 6.2 L V8	3	S	(United States) Anthony Bartone	All
(Germany) GetSpeed	Mercedes-AMG GT3 Evo	Mercedes-AMG M159 6.2 L V8	3	S	(Poland) Karol Basz	All
(Germany) GetSpeed	Mercedes-AMG GT3 Evo	Mercedes-AMG M159 6.2 L V8	3	S	(Switzerland) Yannick Mettler	All
(Germany) GetSpeed	Mercedes-AMG GT3 Evo	Mercedes-AMG M159 6.2 L V8	3	S	(Germany) Tom Kalender	5
(Germany) GetSpeed	Mercedes-AMG GT3 Evo	Mercedes-AMG M159 6.2 L V8	6	S	(Thailand) Tanart Sathienthirakul	All
(Germany) GetSpeed	Mercedes-AMG GT3 Evo	Mercedes-AMG M159 6.2 L V8	6	S	(United Kingdom) Aaron Walker	All
(Germany) GetSpeed	Mercedes-AMG GT3 Evo	Mercedes-AMG M159 6.2 L V8	6	S	(Netherlands) Colin Caresani	1, 4–5
(Germany) GetSpeed	Mercedes-AMG GT3 Evo	Mercedes-AMG M159 6.2 L V8	6	S	(Netherlands) Lin Hodenius	5, 8
(Germany) GetSpeed	Mercedes-AMG GT3 Evo	Mercedes-AMG M159 6.2 L V8	6	S	(Germany) Tom Kalender	10
(Germany) Mercedes-AMG Team GetSpeed	Mercedes-AMG GT3 Evo	Mercedes-AMG M159 6.2 L V8	17	P	(Andorra) Jules Gounon	All
(Germany) Mercedes-AMG Team GetSpeed	Mercedes-AMG GT3 Evo	Mercedes-AMG M159 6.2 L V8	17	P	(Germany) Fabian Schiller	All
(Germany) Mercedes-AMG Team GetSpeed	Mercedes-AMG GT3 Evo	Mercedes-AMG M159 6.2 L V8	17	P	(Germany) Luca Stolz	All
(United States) CrowdStrike by SPS	Mercedes-AMG GT3 Evo	Mercedes-AMG M159 6.2 L V8	4	PA	(United States) Colin Braun	5
(United States) CrowdStrike by SPS	Mercedes-AMG GT3 Evo	Mercedes-AMG M159 6.2 L V8	4	PA	(Netherlands) Nicky Catsburg	5
(United States) CrowdStrike by SPS	Mercedes-AMG GT3 Evo	Mercedes-AMG M159 6.2 L V8	4	PA	(United Kingdom) Ian James	5
(United States) CrowdStrike by SPS	Mercedes-AMG GT3 Evo	Mercedes-AMG M159 6.2 L V8	4	PA	(United States) George Kurtz	5
(United Kingdom) Optimum Motorsport	McLaren 720S GT3 Evo	McLaren M840T 4.0 L Turbo V8	5	G	(Denmark) Largim Ali	All
(United Kingdom) Optimum Motorsport	McLaren 720S GT3 Evo	McLaren M840T 4.0 L Turbo V8	5	G	(Australia) James Allen	All
(United Kingdom) Optimum Motorsport	McLaren 720S GT3 Evo	McLaren M840T 4.0 L Turbo V8	5	G	(United Kingdom) Mikey Porter	All
(United Kingdom) Optimum Motorsport	McLaren 720S GT3 Evo	McLaren M840T 4.0 L Turbo V8	5	G	(United Kingdom) Ollie Millroy	5
(Belgium) Comtoyou Racing	Aston Martin Vantage AMR GT3 Evo	Aston Martin M177 4.0 L Turbo V8	7	P	(Italy) Mattia Drudi	All
(Belgium) Comtoyou Racing	Aston Martin Vantage AMR GT3 Evo	Aston Martin M177 4.0 L Turbo V8	7	P	(Denmark) Marco Sørensen	All
(Belgium) Comtoyou Racing	Aston Martin Vantage AMR GT3 Evo	Aston Martin M177 4.0 L Turbo V8	7	P	(Denmark) Nicki Thiim	All
(Belgium) Comtoyou Racing	Aston Martin Vantage AMR GT3 Evo	Aston Martin M177 4.0 L Turbo V8	11	PA	(Mexico) Sebastian Alvarez	5
(Belgium) Comtoyou Racing	Aston Martin Vantage AMR GT3 Evo	Aston Martin M177 4.0 L Turbo V8	11	PA	(France) Frédéric Jousset	5
(Belgium) Comtoyou Racing	Aston Martin Vantage AMR GT3 Evo	Aston Martin M177 4.0 L Turbo V8	11	PA	(Brazil) Sergio Sette Camara	5
(Belgium) Comtoyou Racing	Aston Martin Vantage AMR GT3 Evo	Aston Martin M177 4.0 L Turbo V8	11	PA	(Portugal) Bernardo Sousa	5
(Belgium) Comtoyou Racing	Aston Martin Vantage AMR GT3 Evo	Aston Martin M177 4.0 L Turbo V8	21	S	(Belgium) Nicolas Baert	All
(Belgium) Comtoyou Racing	Aston Martin Vantage AMR GT3 Evo	Aston Martin M177 4.0 L Turbo V8	21	S	(United Kingdom) Jamie Day	All
(Belgium) Comtoyou Racing	Aston Martin Vantage AMR GT3 Evo	Aston Martin M177 4.0 L Turbo V8	21	S	(Belgium) Kobe Pauwels	All
(Belgium) Comtoyou Racing	Aston Martin Vantage AMR GT3 Evo	Aston Martin M177 4.0 L Turbo V8	21	S	(Netherlands) Xavier Maassen	5
(Belgium) Comtoyou Racing	Aston Martin Vantage AMR GT3 Evo	Aston Martin M177 4.0 L Turbo V8	270	B	(United Kingdom) Jessica Hawkins	All
(Belgium) Comtoyou Racing	Aston Martin Vantage AMR GT3 Evo	Aston Martin M177 4.0 L Turbo V8	270	B	(Belgium) Alexandre Leroy	All
(Belgium) Comtoyou Racing	Aston Martin Vantage AMR GT3 Evo	Aston Martin M177 4.0 L Turbo V8	270	B	(Belgium) Antoine Potty	All
(Belgium) Comtoyou Racing	Aston Martin Vantage AMR GT3 Evo	Aston Martin M177 4.0 L Turbo V8	270	B	(Mozambique) Rodrigo Almeida	5
(Switzerland) Kessel Racing	Ferrari 296 GT3	Ferrari F163CE 3.0 L Turbo V6	8	B	(Italy) David Fumanelli	All
(Switzerland) Kessel Racing	Ferrari 296 GT3	Ferrari F163CE 3.0 L Turbo V6	8	B	(Switzerland) Nicolò Rosi	All
(Switzerland) Kessel Racing	Ferrari 296 GT3	Ferrari F163CE 3.0 L Turbo V6	8	B	(Italy) Niccolò Schirò	All
(Switzerland) Kessel Racing	Ferrari 296 GT3	Ferrari F163CE 3.0 L Turbo V6	8	B	(Italy) Daniele Di Amato	5
(Switzerland) Kessel Racing	Ferrari 296 GT3	Ferrari F163CE 3.0 L Turbo V6	74	B	(United States) Dustin Blattner	All
(Switzerland) Kessel Racing	Ferrari 296 GT3	Ferrari F163CE 3.0 L Turbo V6	74	B	(Denmark) Conrad Laursen	All
(Switzerland) Kessel Racing	Ferrari 296 GT3	Ferrari F163CE 3.0 L Turbo V6	74	B	(Germany) Dennis Marschall	All
(Switzerland) Kessel Racing	Ferrari 296 GT3	Ferrari F163CE 3.0 L Turbo V6	74	B	(Canada) Zacharie Robichon	5
(Belgium) Boutsen VDS	Mercedes-AMG GT3 Evo	Mercedes-AMG M159 6.2 L V8	9	P	(Germany) Maximilian Götz	All
(Belgium) Boutsen VDS	Mercedes-AMG GT3 Evo	Mercedes-AMG M159 6.2 L V8	9	P	(Canada) Mikaël Grenier	All
(Belgium) Boutsen VDS	Mercedes-AMG GT3 Evo	Mercedes-AMG M159 6.2 L V8	9	P	(Belgium) Maxime Martin	All
(Belgium) Boutsen VDS	Mercedes-AMG GT3 Evo	Mercedes-AMG M159 6.2 L V8	10	S	(France) Loris Cabirou	All
(Belgium) Boutsen VDS	Mercedes-AMG GT3 Evo	Mercedes-AMG M159 6.2 L V8	10	S	(France) César Gazeau	All
(Belgium) Boutsen VDS	Mercedes-AMG GT3 Evo	Mercedes-AMG M159 6.2 L V8	10	S	(France) Aurélien Panis	All
(Belgium) Boutsen VDS	Mercedes-AMG GT3 Evo	Mercedes-AMG M159 6.2 L V8	10	S	(United Kingdom) Hugo Cook	5
(Germany) Rinaldi Racing	Ferrari 296 GT3	Ferrari F163CE 3.0 L Turbo V6	12	B	(South Africa) David Perel	All
(Germany) Rinaldi Racing	Ferrari 296 GT3	Ferrari F163CE 3.0 L Turbo V6	12	B	(Germany) Christian Hook	1, 4–5
(Germany) Rinaldi Racing	Ferrari 296 GT3	Ferrari F163CE 3.0 L Turbo V6	12	B	(Italy) Davide Rigon	1, 4–5
(Germany) Rinaldi Racing	Ferrari 296 GT3	Ferrari F163CE 3.0 L Turbo V6	12	B	(Italy) Fabrizio Crestani	8, 10
(Germany) Rinaldi Racing	Ferrari 296 GT3	Ferrari F163CE 3.0 L Turbo V6	12	B	(Italy) Rafael Duran	8, 10
(Germany) Rinaldi Racing	Ferrari 296 GT3	Ferrari F163CE 3.0 L Turbo V6	12	B	(Germany) Felipe Fernandez Laser	5
(Italy) BMW Italia Ceccato Racing	BMW M4 GT3 Evo	BMW P58 3.0 L Twin Turbo I6	15	B	(Italy) Felice Jelmini	All
(Italy) BMW Italia Ceccato Racing	BMW M4 GT3 Evo	BMW P58 3.0 L Twin Turbo I6	15	B	(Italy) Federico Malvestiti	All
(Italy) BMW Italia Ceccato Racing	BMW M4 GT3 Evo	BMW P58 3.0 L Twin Turbo I6	15	B	(Brazil) Marcelo Tomasoni	All
(Italy) BMW Italia Ceccato Racing	BMW M4 GT3 Evo	BMW P58 3.0 L Twin Turbo I6	15	B	(United States) Connor De Phillippi	5
(Italy) Dinamic GT	Porsche 911 GT3 R (992)	Porsche M97/80 4.2 L Flat-6	18	P	(Denmark) Bastian Buus	5
(Italy) Dinamic GT	Porsche 911 GT3 R (992)	Porsche M97/80 4.2 L Flat-6	18	P	(Australia) Matt Campbell	5
(Italy) Dinamic GT	Porsche 911 GT3 R (992)	Porsche M97/80 4.2 L Flat-6	18	P	(France) Mathieu Jaminet	5
(Italy) Dinamic GT	Porsche 911 GT3 R (992)	Porsche M97/80 4.2 L Flat-6	54	S	(United Arab Emirates) Federico Al Rifai	All
(Italy) Dinamic GT	Porsche 911 GT3 R (992)	Porsche M97/80 4.2 L Flat-6	54	S	(Netherlands) Jop Rappange	All
(Italy) Dinamic GT	Porsche 911 GT3 R (992)	Porsche M97/80 4.2 L Flat-6	54	S	(Denmark) Mikkel Pedersen	4, 8, 10
(Italy) Dinamic GT	Porsche 911 GT3 R (992)	Porsche M97/80 4.2 L Flat-6	54	S	(Guatemala) Mateo Llarena	1
(Italy) Dinamic GT	Porsche 911 GT3 R (992)	Porsche M97/80 4.2 L Flat-6	54	S	(Sri Lanka) Eshan Pieris	5
(Italy) Dinamic GT	Porsche 911 GT3 R (992)	Porsche M97/80 4.2 L Flat-6	54	S	(France) Sébastien Baud	5
(Austria) GRT - Grasser Racing Team	Lamborghini Huracán GT3 Evo 2	Lamborghini DGF 5.2 L V10	19	S	Ivan Ekelchik	All
(Austria) GRT - Grasser Racing Team	Lamborghini Huracán GT3 Evo 2	Lamborghini DGF 5.2 L V10	19	S	(Netherlands) Dante Rappange	All
(Austria) GRT - Grasser Racing Team	Lamborghini Huracán GT3 Evo 2	Lamborghini DGF 5.2 L V10	19	S	(Belgium) Baptiste Moulin	1, 4–5, 8
(Austria) GRT - Grasser Racing Team	Lamborghini Huracán GT3 Evo 2	Lamborghini DGF 5.2 L V10	19	S	(China) Jiatong Liang	5
(Austria) GRT - Grasser Racing Team	Lamborghini Huracán GT3 Evo 2	Lamborghini DGF 5.2 L V10	19	S	(Austria) Gerhard Tweraser	10
(Austria) GRT - Grasser Racing Team	Lamborghini Huracán GT3 Evo 2	Lamborghini DGF 5.2 L V10	63	P	(Italy) Mirko Bortolotti	All
(Austria) GRT - Grasser Racing Team	Lamborghini Huracán GT3 Evo 2	Lamborghini DGF 5.2 L V10	63	P	(Germany) Luca Engstler	All
(Austria) GRT - Grasser Racing Team	Lamborghini Huracán GT3 Evo 2	Lamborghini DGF 5.2 L V10	63	P	(South Africa) Jordan Pepper	All
(France) Schumacher CLRT	Porsche 911 GT3 R (992)	Porsche M97/80 4.2 L Flat-6	22	P	(Turkey) Ayhancan Güven	All
(France) Schumacher CLRT	Porsche 911 GT3 R (992)	Porsche M97/80 4.2 L Flat-6	22	P	(Austria) Klaus Bachler	1, 5, 8
(France) Schumacher CLRT	Porsche 911 GT3 R (992)	Porsche M97/80 4.2 L Flat-6	22	P	(Germany) Laurin Heinrich	1, 5, 8
(France) Schumacher CLRT	Porsche 911 GT3 R (992)	Porsche M97/80 4.2 L Flat-6	22	P	(Netherlands) Larry Ten Voorde	4, 10
(France) Schumacher CLRT	Porsche 911 GT3 R (992)	Porsche M97/80 4.2 L Flat-6	22	P	(Netherlands) Morris Schuring	4
(France) Schumacher CLRT	Porsche 911 GT3 R (992)	Porsche M97/80 4.2 L Flat-6	22	P	(France) Alessandro Ghiretti	10
(United Kingdom) Team RJN	McLaren 720S GT3 Evo	McLaren M840T 4.0 L Turbo V8	23	G	(Republic of Ireland) Reece Barr	All
(United Kingdom) Team RJN	McLaren 720S GT3 Evo	McLaren M840T 4.0 L Turbo V8	23	G	(United Kingdom) Alex Buncombe	All
(United Kingdom) Team RJN	McLaren 720S GT3 Evo	McLaren M840T 4.0 L Turbo V8	23	G	(United Kingdom) Tommy Foster	All
(United Kingdom) Team RJN	McLaren 720S GT3 Evo	McLaren M840T 4.0 L Turbo V8	23	G	(Germany) Ben Dörr	5
(United Kingdom) Steller Motorsport	Chevrolet Corvette Z06 GT3.R	Chevrolet LT6.R 5.5 L V8	24	S	(United Kingdom) Lorcan Hanafin	All
(United Kingdom) Steller Motorsport	Chevrolet Corvette Z06 GT3.R	Chevrolet LT6.R 5.5 L V8	24	S	(Canada) Daniel Ali	4–5, 8, 10
(United Kingdom) Steller Motorsport	Chevrolet Corvette Z06 GT3.R	Chevrolet LT6.R 5.5 L V8	24	S	(Belgium) Matisse Lismont	1, 4–5
(United Kingdom) Steller Motorsport	Chevrolet Corvette Z06 GT3.R	Chevrolet LT6.R 5.5 L V8	24	S	(United Kingdom) Kiern Jewiss	1
(United Kingdom) Steller Motorsport	Chevrolet Corvette Z06 GT3.R	Chevrolet LT6.R 5.5 L V8	24	S	(Netherlands) Olivier Hart	5
(United Kingdom) Steller Motorsport	Chevrolet Corvette Z06 GT3.R	Chevrolet LT6.R 5.5 L V8	24	S	(United States) Alec Udell	8
(United Kingdom) Steller Motorsport	Chevrolet Corvette Z06 GT3.R	Chevrolet LT6.R 5.5 L V8	24	S	(Canada) Adam Ali	10
(France) Saintéloc Racing	Audi R8 LMS Evo II	Audi DAR 5.2 L V10	25	B	(France) Paul Evrard	All
(France) Saintéloc Racing	Audi R8 LMS Evo II	Audi DAR 5.2 L V10	25	B	(Belgium) Gilles Magnus	All
(France) Saintéloc Racing	Audi R8 LMS Evo II	Audi DAR 5.2 L V10	25	B	(Switzerland) Benjamin Ricci	All
(France) Saintéloc Racing	Audi R8 LMS Evo II	Audi DAR 5.2 L V10	25	B	(United States) Reece Gold	5
(France) Saintéloc Racing	Audi R8 LMS Evo II	Audi DAR 5.2 L V10	26	S	(Ukraine) Ivan Klymenko	All
(France) Saintéloc Racing	Audi R8 LMS Evo II	Audi DAR 5.2 L V10	26	S	(Belgium) Lorens Lecertua	All
(France) Saintéloc Racing	Audi R8 LMS Evo II	Audi DAR 5.2 L V10	26	S	(Switzerland) Lucas Legeret	1, 4
(France) Saintéloc Racing	Audi R8 LMS Evo II	Audi DAR 5.2 L V10	26	S	(United States) Reece Gold	8, 10
(France) Saintéloc Racing	Audi R8 LMS Evo II	Audi DAR 5.2 L V10	26	S	(United States) Wyatt Brichacek	5
(France) Saintéloc Racing	Audi R8 LMS Evo II	Audi DAR 5.2 L V10	26	S	(Belgium) Lorenzo Donniacuo	5
(Qatar) QMMF by Saintéloc Racing	Audi R8 LMS Evo II	Audi DAR 5.2 L V10	27	B	(Qatar) Abdulla Ali Al-Khelaifi	All
(Qatar) QMMF by Saintéloc Racing	Audi R8 LMS Evo II	Audi DAR 5.2 L V10	27	B	(Qatar) Ghanim Salah Al-Maadheed	All
(Qatar) QMMF by Saintéloc Racing	Audi R8 LMS Evo II	Audi DAR 5.2 L V10	27	B	(Qatar) Ibrahim Al-Abdulghani	1, 4–5, 8
(Qatar) QMMF by Saintéloc Racing	Audi R8 LMS Evo II	Audi DAR 5.2 L V10	27	B	(Germany) Julian Hanses	5, 10
(Antigua and Barbuda) Haas RT	Audi R8 LMS Evo II	Audi DAR 5.2 L V10	28	PA	(Belgium) Simon Balcaen	5
(Antigua and Barbuda) Haas RT	Audi R8 LMS Evo II	Audi DAR 5.2 L V10	28	PA	(Belgium) Xavier Knauf	5
(Antigua and Barbuda) Haas RT	Audi R8 LMS Evo II	Audi DAR 5.2 L V10	28	PA	(France) Steven Palette	5
(Antigua and Barbuda) Haas RT	Audi R8 LMS Evo II	Audi DAR 5.2 L V10	28	PA	(Belgium) Gregory Servais	5
(Germany) AV Racing by Car Collection Motorsport	Porsche 911 GT3 R (992)	Porsche M97/80 4.2 L Flat-6	29	PA	(France) Noam Abramczyk	5
(Germany) AV Racing by Car Collection Motorsport	Porsche 911 GT3 R (992)	Porsche M97/80 4.2 L Flat-6	29	PA	(Belgium) Mathieu Detry	5
(Germany) AV Racing by Car Collection Motorsport	Porsche 911 GT3 R (992)	Porsche M97/80 4.2 L Flat-6	29	PA	(Belgium) Fabian Duffieux	5
(Germany) AV Racing by Car Collection Motorsport	Porsche 911 GT3 R (992)	Porsche M97/80 4.2 L Flat-6	29	PA	(China) Bo Yuan	5
(Belgium) Team WRT	BMW M4 GT3 Evo	BMW P58 3.0 L Twin Turbo I6	30	S	(France) Étienne Cheli	All
(Belgium) Team WRT	BMW M4 GT3 Evo	BMW P58 3.0 L Twin Turbo I6	30	S	(Belgium) Gilles Stadsbader	All
(Belgium) Team WRT	BMW M4 GT3 Evo	BMW P58 3.0 L Twin Turbo I6	30	S	(Sweden) Gustav Bergström	1, 4–5
(Belgium) Team WRT	BMW M4 GT3 Evo	BMW P58 3.0 L Twin Turbo I6	30	S	(Belgium) Matisse Lismont	8, 10
(Belgium) Team WRT	BMW M4 GT3 Evo	BMW P58 3.0 L Twin Turbo I6	30	S	(France) Pierre-Louis Chovet	5
(Belgium) Team WRT	BMW M4 GT3 Evo	BMW P58 3.0 L Twin Turbo I6	31	P	(South Africa) Sheldon van der Linde	5
(Belgium) Team WRT	BMW M4 GT3 Evo	BMW P58 3.0 L Twin Turbo I6	31	P	(Belgium) Dries Vanthoor	5
(Belgium) Team WRT	BMW M4 GT3 Evo	BMW P58 3.0 L Twin Turbo I6	31	P	(Germany) Marco Wittmann	5
(Belgium) Team WRT	BMW M4 GT3 Evo	BMW P58 3.0 L Twin Turbo I6	32	P	(South Africa) Kelvin van der Linde	All
(Belgium) Team WRT	BMW M4 GT3 Evo	BMW P58 3.0 L Twin Turbo I6	32	P	(Belgium) Charles Weerts	All
(Belgium) Team WRT	BMW M4 GT3 Evo	BMW P58 3.0 L Twin Turbo I6	32	P	(Belgium) Ugo de Wilde	All
(Belgium) Team WRT	BMW M4 GT3 Evo	BMW P58 3.0 L Twin Turbo I6	46	P	(Denmark) Kevin Magnussen	5
(Belgium) Team WRT	BMW M4 GT3 Evo	BMW P58 3.0 L Twin Turbo I6	46	P	(Germany) René Rast	5
(Belgium) Team WRT	BMW M4 GT3 Evo	BMW P58 3.0 L Twin Turbo I6	46	P	(Italy) Valentino Rossi	5
(Oman) AlManar Racing by WRT	BMW M4 GT3 Evo	BMW P58 3.0 L Twin Turbo I6	777	G	(Oman) Al Faisal Al Zubair	All
(Oman) AlManar Racing by WRT	BMW M4 GT3 Evo	BMW P58 3.0 L Twin Turbo I6	777	G	(Germany) Jens Klingmann	All
(Oman) AlManar Racing by WRT	BMW M4 GT3 Evo	BMW P58 3.0 L Twin Turbo I6	777	G	(United Kingdom) Ben Tuck	All
(Oman) AlManar Racing by WRT	BMW M4 GT3 Evo	BMW P58 3.0 L Twin Turbo I6	777	G	(United States) Neil Verhagen	5
(Netherlands) Verstappen.com Racing	Aston Martin Vantage AMR GT3 Evo	Aston Martin M177 4.0 L Turbo V8	33	G	(United Kingdom) Harry King	All
(Netherlands) Verstappen.com Racing	Aston Martin Vantage AMR GT3 Evo	Aston Martin M177 4.0 L Turbo V8	33	G	(United Kingdom) Chris Lulham	All
(Netherlands) Verstappen.com Racing	Aston Martin Vantage AMR GT3 Evo	Aston Martin M177 4.0 L Turbo V8	33	G	(Netherlands) Thierry Vermeulen	All
(Germany) Walkenhorst Motorsport	Aston Martin Vantage AMR GT3 Evo	Aston Martin M177 4.0 L Turbo V8	34	P	(Portugal) Henrique Chaves	All
(Germany) Walkenhorst Motorsport	Aston Martin Vantage AMR GT3 Evo	Aston Martin M177 4.0 L Turbo V8	34	P	(Norway) Christian Krognes	All
(Germany) Walkenhorst Motorsport	Aston Martin Vantage AMR GT3 Evo	Aston Martin M177 4.0 L Turbo V8	34	P	(United Kingdom) David Pittard	All
(Germany) Walkenhorst Motorsport	Aston Martin Vantage AMR GT3 Evo	Aston Martin M177 4.0 L Turbo V8	35	S	(France) Romain Leroux	All
(Germany) Walkenhorst Motorsport	Aston Martin Vantage AMR GT3 Evo	Aston Martin M177 4.0 L Turbo V8	35	S	(Sweden) Oliver Söderström	All
(Germany) Walkenhorst Motorsport	Aston Martin Vantage AMR GT3 Evo	Aston Martin M177 4.0 L Turbo V8	35	S	(Ecuador) Mateo Villagomez	All
(United Kingdom) Century Motorsport	BMW M4 GT3 Evo	BMW P58 3.0 L Twin Turbo I6	42	S	(Netherlands) Mex Jansen	All
(United Kingdom) Century Motorsport	BMW M4 GT3 Evo	BMW P58 3.0 L Twin Turbo I6	42	S	(United Kingdom) Will Moore	All
(United Kingdom) Century Motorsport	BMW M4 GT3 Evo	BMW P58 3.0 L Twin Turbo I6	42	S	(South Africa) Jarrod Waberski	All
(United States) Mercedes-AMG Team Mann-Filter	Mercedes-AMG GT3 Evo	Mercedes-AMG M159 6.2 L V8	48	P	(Austria) Lucas Auer	All
(United States) Mercedes-AMG Team Mann-Filter	Mercedes-AMG GT3 Evo	Mercedes-AMG M159 6.2 L V8	48	P	(Italy) Matteo Cairoli	All
(United States) Mercedes-AMG Team Mann-Filter	Mercedes-AMG GT3 Evo	Mercedes-AMG M159 6.2 L V8	48	P	(Germany) Maro Engel	All
(United States) Winward Racing	Mercedes-AMG GT3 Evo	Mercedes-AMG M159 6.2 L V8	57	G	(Netherlands) Indy Dontje	5
(United States) Winward Racing	Mercedes-AMG GT3 Evo	Mercedes-AMG M159 6.2 L V8	57	G	(Switzerland) Philip Ellis	5
(United States) Winward Racing	Mercedes-AMG GT3 Evo	Mercedes-AMG M159 6.2 L V8	57	G	(United States) Russell Ward	5
(United States) Winward Racing	Mercedes-AMG GT3 Evo	Mercedes-AMG M159 6.2 L V8	81	B	(Germany) Marvin Dienst	All
(United States) Winward Racing	Mercedes-AMG GT3 Evo	Mercedes-AMG M159 6.2 L V8	81	B	(Italy) Gabriele Piana	All
(United States) Winward Racing	Mercedes-AMG GT3 Evo	Mercedes-AMG M159 6.2 L V8	81	B	(Armenia) Rinat Salikhov	All
(United States) Winward Racing	Mercedes-AMG GT3 Evo	Mercedes-AMG M159 6.2 L V8	81	B	(Netherlands) "Daan Arrow"	5
(Italy) AF Corse - Francorchamps Motors	Ferrari 296 GT3	Ferrari F163CE 3.0 L Turbo V6	50	P	(Italy) Eliseo Donno	All
(Italy) AF Corse - Francorchamps Motors	Ferrari 296 GT3	Ferrari F163CE 3.0 L Turbo V6	50	P	(Italy) Antonio Fuoco	All
(Italy) AF Corse - Francorchamps Motors	Ferrari 296 GT3	Ferrari F163CE 3.0 L Turbo V6	50	P	(Monaco) Arthur Leclerc	All
(Italy) AF Corse - Francorchamps Motors	Ferrari 296 GT3	Ferrari F163CE 3.0 L Turbo V6	51	P	(Monaco) Vincent Abril	All
(Italy) AF Corse - Francorchamps Motors	Ferrari 296 GT3	Ferrari F163CE 3.0 L Turbo V6	51	P	(Italy) Alessio Rovera	All
(Italy) AF Corse - Francorchamps Motors	Ferrari 296 GT3	Ferrari F163CE 3.0 L Turbo V6	51	P	(Italy) Alessandro Pier Guidi	1, 4–5, 8
(Italy) AF Corse - Francorchamps Motors	Ferrari 296 GT3	Ferrari F163CE 3.0 L Turbo V6	51	P	(China) Yifei Ye	10
(Italy) AF Corse - Francorchamps Motors	Ferrari 296 GT3	Ferrari F163CE 3.0 L Turbo V6	52	B	(Belgium) Jef Machiels	All
(Italy) AF Corse - Francorchamps Motors	Ferrari 296 GT3	Ferrari F163CE 3.0 L Turbo V6	52	B	(Belgium) Louis Machiels	All
(Italy) AF Corse - Francorchamps Motors	Ferrari 296 GT3	Ferrari F163CE 3.0 L Turbo V6	52	B	(Italy) Tommaso Mosca	5, 8, 10
(Italy) AF Corse - Francorchamps Motors	Ferrari 296 GT3	Ferrari F163CE 3.0 L Turbo V6	52	B	(Italy) Andrea Bertolini	1, 4
(Italy) AF Corse - Francorchamps Motors	Ferrari 296 GT3	Ferrari F163CE 3.0 L Turbo V6	52	B	(Argentina) Marco Siebert	5
(Italy) AF Corse	Ferrari 296 GT3	Ferrari F163CE 3.0 L Turbo V6	70	PA	(Italy) Ricardo Agostini	5
(Italy) AF Corse	Ferrari 296 GT3	Ferrari F163CE 3.0 L Turbo V6	70	PA	(United States) Matthew Bell	5
(Italy) AF Corse	Ferrari 296 GT3	Ferrari F163CE 3.0 L Turbo V6	70	PA	(United States) Blake McDonald	5
(Italy) AF Corse	Ferrari 296 GT3	Ferrari F163CE 3.0 L Turbo V6	70	PA	(Brazil) Custodio Toledo	5
(Italy) AF Corse	Ferrari 296 GT3	Ferrari F163CE 3.0 L Turbo V6	71	PA	(Belgium) Stéphane Lemeret	5
(Italy) AF Corse	Ferrari 296 GT3	Ferrari F163CE 3.0 L Turbo V6	71	PA	(Spain) Miguel Molina	5
(Italy) AF Corse	Ferrari 296 GT3	Ferrari F163CE 3.0 L Turbo V6	71	PA	(Argentina) Louis Perez Companc	5
(Italy) AF Corse	Ferrari 296 GT3	Ferrari F163CE 3.0 L Turbo V6	71	PA	(Argentina) Mathias Perez Companc	5
(United Kingdom) Ziggo Sport – Tempesta Racing	Ferrari 296 GT3	Ferrari F163CE 3.0 L Turbo V6	93	B	(Italy) Eddie Cheever III	All
(United Kingdom) Ziggo Sport – Tempesta Racing	Ferrari 296 GT3	Ferrari F163CE 3.0 L Turbo V6	93	B	(United Kingdom) Chris Froggatt	All
(United Kingdom) Ziggo Sport – Tempesta Racing	Ferrari 296 GT3	Ferrari F163CE 3.0 L Turbo V6	93	B	(Italy) Marco Pulcini	1, 8, 10
(United Kingdom) Ziggo Sport – Tempesta Racing	Ferrari 296 GT3	Ferrari F163CE 3.0 L Turbo V6	93	B	(Hong Kong) Jonathan Hui	4–5
(United Kingdom) Ziggo Sport – Tempesta Racing	Ferrari 296 GT3	Ferrari F163CE 3.0 L Turbo V6	93	B	(Italy) Lorenzo Patrese	5
(United Kingdom) Garage 59	McLaren 720S GT3 Evo	McLaren M840T 4.0 L Turbo V8	58	G	(United Kingdom) Dean MacDonald	All
(United Kingdom) Garage 59	McLaren 720S GT3 Evo	McLaren M840T 4.0 L Turbo V8	58	G	(Monaco) Louis Prette	All
(United Kingdom) Garage 59	McLaren 720S GT3 Evo	McLaren M840T 4.0 L Turbo V8	58	G	(United Kingdom) Adam Smalley	All
(United Kingdom) Garage 59	McLaren 720S GT3 Evo	McLaren M840T 4.0 L Turbo V8	58	G	(Denmark) Frederik Schandorff	5
(United Kingdom) Garage 59	McLaren 720S GT3 Evo	McLaren M840T 4.0 L Turbo V8	59	P	(Germany) Benjamin Goethe	All
(United Kingdom) Garage 59	McLaren 720S GT3 Evo	McLaren M840T 4.0 L Turbo V8	59	P	(Germany) Marvin Kirchhöfer	All
(United Kingdom) Garage 59	McLaren 720S GT3 Evo	McLaren M840T 4.0 L Turbo V8	59	P	(United Kingdom) Joseph Loake	All
(United Kingdom) Garage 59	McLaren 720S GT3 Evo	McLaren M840T 4.0 L Turbo V8	188	B	(United Kingdom) Thomas Fleming	1, 4–5
(United Kingdom) Garage 59	McLaren 720S GT3 Evo	McLaren M840T 4.0 L Turbo V8	188	B	(Portugal) Guilherme Oliveira	1, 4–5
(United Kingdom) Garage 59	McLaren 720S GT3 Evo	McLaren M840T 4.0 L Turbo V8	188	B	(Portugal) Miguel Ramos	1, 4
(United Kingdom) Garage 59	McLaren 720S GT3 Evo	McLaren M840T 4.0 L Turbo V8	188	B	(United Kingdom) Shaun Balfe	5
(United Kingdom) Garage 59	McLaren 720S GT3 Evo	McLaren M840T 4.0 L Turbo V8	188	B	(United Kingdom) Jack Hawksworth	5
(United Kingdom) Garage 59	McLaren 720S GT3 Evo	McLaren M840T 4.0 L Turbo V8	188	S	(United Kingdom) James Baldwin	8, 10
(United Kingdom) Garage 59	McLaren 720S GT3 Evo	McLaren M840T 4.0 L Turbo V8	188	S	(United Kingdom) Thomas Fleming	8, 10
(United Kingdom) Garage 59	McLaren 720S GT3 Evo	McLaren M840T 4.0 L Turbo V8	188	S	(Portugal) Guilherme Oliveira	8, 10
(Italy) VSR	Lamborghini Huracán GT3 Evo 2	Lamborghini DGF 5.2 L V10	60	S	(Italy) Michele Beretta	All
(Italy) VSR	Lamborghini Huracán GT3 Evo 2	Lamborghini DGF 5.2 L V10	60	S	(Italy) Alessio Deledda	All
(Italy) VSR	Lamborghini Huracán GT3 Evo 2	Lamborghini DGF 5.2 L V10	60	S	(Italy) Andrea Frassineti	4, 5
(Italy) VSR	Lamborghini Huracán GT3 Evo 2	Lamborghini DGF 5.2 L V10	60	S	(Italy) Mattia Michelotto	5, 10
(Italy) VSR	Lamborghini Huracán GT3 Evo 2	Lamborghini DGF 5.2 L V10	60	S	(United Kingdom) Finlay Hutchison	1
(Italy) VSR	Lamborghini Huracán GT3 Evo 2	Lamborghini DGF 5.2 L V10	60	S	(Israel) Artem Petrov	8
(Italy) VSR	Lamborghini Huracán GT3 Evo 2	Lamborghini DGF 5.2 L V10	163	P	(United Kingdom) Sandy Mitchell	All
(Italy) VSR	Lamborghini Huracán GT3 Evo 2	Lamborghini DGF 5.2 L V10	163	P	(France) Franck Perera	All
(Italy) VSR	Lamborghini Huracán GT3 Evo 2	Lamborghini DGF 5.2 L V10	163	P	(Italy) Marco Mapelli	1, 5, 8
(Italy) VSR	Lamborghini Huracán GT3 Evo 2	Lamborghini DGF 5.2 L V10	163	P	(Italy) Mattia Michelotto	4
(Italy) VSR	Lamborghini Huracán GT3 Evo 2	Lamborghini DGF 5.2 L V10	163	P	(United States) Loris Spinelli	10
(Germany) HRT Ford Performance	Ford Mustang GT3	Ford Coyote 5.4 L V8	64	P	(France) Thomas Drouet	All
(Germany) HRT Ford Performance	Ford Mustang GT3	Ford Coyote 5.4 L V8	64	P	(India) Arjun Maini	All
(Germany) HRT Ford Performance	Ford Mustang GT3	Ford Coyote 5.4 L V8	64	P	(United Kingdom) Jann Mardenborough	All
(Germany) HRT Ford Performance	Ford Mustang GT3	Ford Coyote 5.4 L V8	65	S	(France) Romain Andriolo	All
(Germany) HRT Ford Performance	Ford Mustang GT3	Ford Coyote 5.4 L V8	65	S	(Germany) David Schumacher	All
(Germany) HRT Ford Performance	Ford Mustang GT3	Ford Coyote 5.4 L V8	65	S	(Germany) Finn Wiebelhaus	All
(Germany) HRT Ford Performance	Ford Mustang GT3	Ford Coyote 5.4 L V8	65	S	(Germany) Salman Owega	5
(Germany) Tresor Attempto Racing	Audi R8 LMS Evo II	Audi DAR 5.2 L V10	66	B	(Austria) Max Hofer	All
(Germany) Tresor Attempto Racing	Audi R8 LMS Evo II	Audi DAR 5.2 L V10	66	B	Andrey Mukovoz	All
(Germany) Tresor Attempto Racing	Audi R8 LMS Evo II	Audi DAR 5.2 L V10	66	B	Alexey Nesov	All
(Germany) Tresor Attempto Racing	Audi R8 LMS Evo II	Audi DAR 5.2 L V10	66	B	(Luxembourg) Dylan Pereira	5
(Germany) Tresor Attempto Racing	Audi R8 LMS Evo II	Audi DAR 5.2 L V10	88	G	(Italy) Riccardo Cazzaniga	All
(Germany) Tresor Attempto Racing	Audi R8 LMS Evo II	Audi DAR 5.2 L V10	88	G	(Denmark) Sebastian Øgaard	All
(Germany) Tresor Attempto Racing	Audi R8 LMS Evo II	Audi DAR 5.2 L V10	88	G	(Italy) Leonardo Moncini	1, 4–5
(Germany) Tresor Attempto Racing	Audi R8 LMS Evo II	Audi DAR 5.2 L V10	88	G	(Netherlands) Job van Uitert	8, 10
(Germany) Tresor Attempto Racing	Audi R8 LMS Evo II	Audi DAR 5.2 L V10	88	G	(Italy) Rocco Mazzola	5
(Germany) Tresor Attempto Racing	Audi R8 LMS Evo II	Audi DAR 5.2 L V10	99	S	(Germany) Alex Aka	All
(Germany) Tresor Attempto Racing	Audi R8 LMS Evo II	Audi DAR 5.2 L V10	99	S	(Italy) Alberto Di Folco	All
(Germany) Tresor Attempto Racing	Audi R8 LMS Evo II	Audi DAR 5.2 L V10	99	S	(Argentina) Ezequiel Pérez Companc	1, 4–5
(Germany) Tresor Attempto Racing	Audi R8 LMS Evo II	Audi DAR 5.2 L V10	99	S	(Italy) Leonardo Moncini	8, 10
(Germany) Tresor Attempto Racing	Audi R8 LMS Evo II	Audi DAR 5.2 L V10	99	S	(United States) Philippe Denes	5
(United Kingdom) Barwell Motorsport	Lamborghini Huracán GT3 Evo 2	Lamborghini DGF 5.2 L V10	76	S	(Canada) Adam Ali	1, 4
(United Kingdom) Barwell Motorsport	Lamborghini Huracán GT3 Evo 2	Lamborghini DGF 5.2 L V10	76	S	(United States) Bijoy Garg	1, 4
(United Kingdom) Barwell Motorsport	Lamborghini Huracán GT3 Evo 2	Lamborghini DGF 5.2 L V10	76	S	(United States) Christian Bogle	1, 4
(United Kingdom) Barwell Motorsport	Lamborghini Huracán GT3 Evo 2	Lamborghini DGF 5.2 L V10	76	B	(Canada) Adam Ali	5
(United Kingdom) Barwell Motorsport	Lamborghini Huracán GT3 Evo 2	Lamborghini DGF 5.2 L V10	76	B	(United States) Bijoy Garg	5
(United Kingdom) Barwell Motorsport	Lamborghini Huracán GT3 Evo 2	Lamborghini DGF 5.2 L V10	76	B	(United Kingdom) Ricky Collard	5
(United Kingdom) Barwell Motorsport	Lamborghini Huracán GT3 Evo 2	Lamborghini DGF 5.2 L V10	76	B	(United Kingdom) Rob Collard	5
(United Kingdom) Greystone GT	McLaren 720S GT3 Evo	McLaren M840T 4.0 L Turbo V8	77	S	(Spain) Jayden Kelly	10
(United Kingdom) Greystone GT	McLaren 720S GT3 Evo	McLaren M840T 4.0 L Turbo V8	77	S	(United Kingdom) Zac Meakin	10
(United Kingdom) Greystone GT	McLaren 720S GT3 Evo	McLaren M840T 4.0 L Turbo V8	77	S	(United Kingdom) Michael O'Brien	10
(Germany) Lionspeed GP	Porsche 911 GT3 R (992)	Porsche M97/80 4.2 L Flat-6	80	B	(Switzerland) Ricardo Feller	All
(Germany) Lionspeed GP	Porsche 911 GT3 R (992)	Porsche M97/80 4.2 L Flat-6	80	B	(Germany) Patrick Kolb	All
(Germany) Lionspeed GP	Porsche 911 GT3 R (992)	Porsche M97/80 4.2 L Flat-6	80	B	(Luxembourg) Gabriel Rindone	All
(Germany) Lionspeed GP	Porsche 911 GT3 R (992)	Porsche M97/80 4.2 L Flat-6	80	B	(Italy) Riccardo Pera	5
(Germany) Herberth Motorsport	Porsche 911 GT3 R (992)	Porsche M97/80 4.2 L Flat-6	91	B	(Germany) Ralf Bohn	1, 4–5, 8
(Germany) Herberth Motorsport	Porsche 911 GT3 R (992)	Porsche M97/80 4.2 L Flat-6	91	B	(Germany) Alfred Renauer	1, 4–5, 8
(Germany) Herberth Motorsport	Porsche 911 GT3 R (992)	Porsche M97/80 4.2 L Flat-6	91	B	(Germany) Robert Renauer	1, 4–5, 8
(Germany) Herberth Motorsport	Porsche 911 GT3 R (992)	Porsche M97/80 4.2 L Flat-6	91	B	(Zimbabwe) Axcil Jefferies	5
(Germany) Herberth Motorsport	Porsche 911 GT3 R (992)	Porsche M97/80 4.2 L Flat-6	92	G	(Germany) Tim Heinemann	1, 4–5, 8
(Germany) Herberth Motorsport	Porsche 911 GT3 R (992)	Porsche M97/80 4.2 L Flat-6	92	G	(Switzerland) Rolf Ineichen	1, 4–5, 8
(Germany) Herberth Motorsport	Porsche 911 GT3 R (992)	Porsche M97/80 4.2 L Flat-6	92	G	(Germany) Joel Sturm	1, 4–5, 8
(Germany) Herberth Motorsport	Porsche 911 GT3 R (992)	Porsche M97/80 4.2 L Flat-6	92	B	(Germany) Tim Heinemann	10
(Germany) Herberth Motorsport	Porsche 911 GT3 R (992)	Porsche M97/80 4.2 L Flat-6	92	B	(Germany) Ralf Bohn	10
(Germany) Herberth Motorsport	Porsche 911 GT3 R (992)	Porsche M97/80 4.2 L Flat-6	92	B	(Germany) Alfred Renauer	10
(Germany) Rutronik Racing	Porsche 911 GT3 R (992)	Porsche M97/80 4.2 L Flat-6	96	P	(Germany) Sven Müller	All
(Germany) Rutronik Racing	Porsche 911 GT3 R (992)	Porsche M97/80 4.2 L Flat-6	96	P	(Switzerland) Patric Niederhauser	All
(Germany) Rutronik Racing	Porsche 911 GT3 R (992)	Porsche M97/80 4.2 L Flat-6	96	P	(Belgium) Alessio Picariello	All
(Germany) Rutronik Racing	Porsche 911 GT3 R (992)	Porsche M97/80 4.2 L Flat-6	97	B	(Hong Kong) Antares Au	All
(Germany) Rutronik Racing	Porsche 911 GT3 R (992)	Porsche M97/80 4.2 L Flat-6	97	B	(Netherlands) Loek Hartog	All
(Germany) Rutronik Racing	Porsche 911 GT3 R (992)	Porsche M97/80 4.2 L Flat-6	97	B	(Netherlands) Morris Schuring	1, 5, 8, 10
(Germany) Rutronik Racing	Porsche 911 GT3 R (992)	Porsche M97/80 4.2 L Flat-6	97	B	(Estonia) Martin Rump	5
(Germany) ROWE Racing	BMW M4 GT3 Evo	BMW P58 3.0 L Twin Turbo I6	98	P	(Brazil) Augusto Farfus	All
(Germany) ROWE Racing	BMW M4 GT3 Evo	BMW P58 3.0 L Twin Turbo I6	98	P	(Finland) Jesse Krohn	All
(Germany) ROWE Racing	BMW M4 GT3 Evo	BMW P58 3.0 L Twin Turbo I6	98	P	(Switzerland) Raffaele Marciello	All
(Germany) ROWE Racing	BMW M4 GT3 Evo	BMW P58 3.0 L Twin Turbo I6	998	P	(Austria) Philipp Eng	5
(Germany) ROWE Racing	BMW M4 GT3 Evo	BMW P58 3.0 L Twin Turbo I6	998	P	(United Kingdom) Dan Harper	5
(Germany) ROWE Racing	BMW M4 GT3 Evo	BMW P58 3.0 L Twin Turbo I6	998	P	(Germany) Max Hesse	5
(United Kingdom) Beechdean Motorsport	Aston Martin Vantage AMR GT3 Evo	Aston Martin M177 4.0 L Turbo V8	100	PA	(United Kingdom) Ross Gunn	5
(United Kingdom) Beechdean Motorsport	Aston Martin Vantage AMR GT3 Evo	Aston Martin M177 4.0 L Turbo V8	100	PA	(France) Valentin Hasse-Clot	5
(United Kingdom) Beechdean Motorsport	Aston Martin Vantage AMR GT3 Evo	Aston Martin M177 4.0 L Turbo V8	100	PA	(United Kingdom) Andrew Howard	5
(United Kingdom) Beechdean Motorsport	Aston Martin Vantage AMR GT3 Evo	Aston Martin M177 4.0 L Turbo V8	100	PA	(United States) Anthony McIntosh	5
(France) CSA Racing	McLaren 720S GT3 Evo	McLaren M840T 4.0 L Turbo V8	111	G	(France) Simon Gachet	All
(France) CSA Racing	McLaren 720S GT3 Evo	McLaren M840T 4.0 L Turbo V8	111	G	(United Kingdom) James Kell	All
(France) CSA Racing	McLaren 720S GT3 Evo	McLaren M840T 4.0 L Turbo V8	111	G	(France) Arthur Rougier	All
(France) CSA Racing	McLaren 720S GT3 Evo	McLaren M840T 4.0 L Turbo V8	111	G	(France) Jim Pla	5
(France) CSA Racing	McLaren 720S GT3 Evo	McLaren M840T 4.0 L Turbo V8	112	S	(France) Edgar Maloigne	All
(France) CSA Racing	McLaren 720S GT3 Evo	McLaren M840T 4.0 L Turbo V8	112	S	(France) Maxime Robin	All
(France) CSA Racing	McLaren 720S GT3 Evo	McLaren M840T 4.0 L Turbo V8	112	S	(India) Sai Sanjay	All
(France) CSA Racing	McLaren 720S GT3 Evo	McLaren M840T 4.0 L Turbo V8	112	S	(United Kingdom) Joshua Mason	5
(United States) Wright Motorsports	Porsche 911 GT3 R (992)	Porsche M97/80 4.2 L Flat-6	120	G	(United States) Adam Adelson	5, 8
(United States) Wright Motorsports	Porsche 911 GT3 R (992)	Porsche M97/80 4.2 L Flat-6	120	G	(Australia) Thomas Sargent	5, 8
(United States) Wright Motorsports	Porsche 911 GT3 R (992)	Porsche M97/80 4.2 L Flat-6	120	G	(United States) Elliott Skeer	5, 8
(Bahrain) 2 Seas Motorsport	Mercedes-AMG GT3 Evo	Mercedes-AMG M159 6.2 L V8	222	B	(United Kingdom) Ben Barnicoat	8, 10
(Bahrain) 2 Seas Motorsport	Mercedes-AMG GT3 Evo	Mercedes-AMG M159 6.2 L V8	222	B	(United Kingdom) Charles Dawson	8, 10
(Bahrain) 2 Seas Motorsport	Mercedes-AMG GT3 Evo	Mercedes-AMG M159 6.2 L V8	222	B	(United Kingdom) Thomas Lebbon	8, 10
(Bahrain) 2 Seas Motorsport	Mercedes-AMG GT3 Evo	Mercedes-AMG M159 6.2 L V8	222	B	(United Kingdom) Kiern Jewiss	5
(Bahrain) 2 Seas Motorsport	Mercedes-AMG GT3 Evo	Mercedes-AMG M159 6.2 L V8	222	B	(Canada) Parker Thompson	5
(Bahrain) 2 Seas Motorsport	Mercedes-AMG GT3 Evo	Mercedes-AMG M159 6.2 L V8	222	B	(North Macedonia) Kevin Tse	5
(Bahrain) 2 Seas Motorsport	Mercedes-AMG GT3 Evo	Mercedes-AMG M159 6.2 L V8	222	B	(United Kingdom) Lewis Williamson	5
(Germany) Paul Motorsport	Lamborghini Huracán GT3 Evo 2	Lamborghini DGF 5.2 L V10	333	G	(Italy) Marzio Moretti	All
(Germany) Paul Motorsport	Lamborghini Huracán GT3 Evo 2	Lamborghini DGF 5.2 L V10	333	G	(Germany) Maximilian Paul	All
(Germany) Paul Motorsport	Lamborghini Huracán GT3 Evo 2	Lamborghini DGF 5.2 L V10	333	G	(United States) John Paul Southern Jr	All
(Germany) Paul Motorsport	Lamborghini Huracán GT3 Evo 2	Lamborghini DGF 5.2 L V10	333	G	(Poland) Robin Rogalski	5
(Germany) Ring Racing	Mercedes-AMG GT3 Evo	Mercedes-AMG M159 6.2 L V8	611	P	(Italy) Edoardo Liberati	1, 8, 10
(Germany) Ring Racing	Mercedes-AMG GT3 Evo	Mercedes-AMG M159 6.2 L V8	611	P	(Japan) Yuichi Nakayama	1, 8, 10
(Germany) Ring Racing	Mercedes-AMG GT3 Evo	Mercedes-AMG M159 6.2 L V8	611	P	(United Kingdom) Adam Christodoulou	8, 10
(Germany) Ring Racing	Mercedes-AMG GT3 Evo	Mercedes-AMG M159 6.2 L V8	611	P	(Japan) Kazuto Kotaka	1
(Germany) Ring Racing	Mercedes-AMG GT3 Evo	Mercedes-AMG M159 6.2 L V8	611	G	(Japan) Kazuto Kotaka	4–5
(Germany) Ring Racing	Mercedes-AMG GT3 Evo	Mercedes-AMG M159 6.2 L V8	611	G	(Italy) Edoardo Liberati	4–5
(Germany) Ring Racing	Mercedes-AMG GT3 Evo	Mercedes-AMG M159 6.2 L V8	611	G	(Germany) Tim Sandtler	4–5
(Germany) Ring Racing	Mercedes-AMG GT3 Evo	Mercedes-AMG M159 6.2 L V8	611	G	(Japan) Yuichi Nakayama	5
(Italy) UNX Racing	Porsche 911 GT3 R (992)	Porsche M97/80 4.2 L Flat-6	888	B	(United Arab Emirates) Mathieu Detry	8, 10
(Italy) UNX Racing	Porsche 911 GT3 R (992)	Porsche M97/80 4.2 L Flat-6	888	B	(United Arab Emirates) Fabian Duffieux	8, 10
(Italy) UNX Racing	Porsche 911 GT3 R (992)	Porsche M97/80 4.2 L Flat-6	888	B	(Austria) Bastian Buus	10
(Lithuania) Pure Rxcing	Porsche 911 GT3 R (992)	Porsche M97/80 4.2 L Flat-6	911	P	(Austria) Richard Lietz	All
(Lithuania) Pure Rxcing	Porsche 911 GT3 R (992)	Porsche M97/80 4.2 L Flat-6	911	P	(United Kingdom) Alex Malykhin	All
(Lithuania) Pure Rxcing	Porsche 911 GT3 R (992)	Porsche M97/80 4.2 L Flat-6	911	P	(Austria) Thomas Preining	All
(United Kingdom) Paradine Competition	BMW M4 GT3 Evo	BMW P58 3.0 L Twin Turbo I6	991	B	(Indonesia) Sean Gelael	All
(United Kingdom) Paradine Competition	BMW M4 GT3 Evo	BMW P58 3.0 L Twin Turbo I6	991	B	(United Kingdom) Darren Leung	All
(United Kingdom) Paradine Competition	BMW M4 GT3 Evo	BMW P58 3.0 L Twin Turbo I6	991	B	(United Kingdom) Dan Harper	1, 8
(United Kingdom) Paradine Competition	BMW M4 GT3 Evo	BMW P58 3.0 L Twin Turbo I6	991	B	(United Kingdom) Jake Dennis	5, 10
(United Kingdom) Paradine Competition	BMW M4 GT3 Evo	BMW P58 3.0 L Twin Turbo I6	991	B	(United Kingdom) Ashley Sutton	4
(United Kingdom) Paradine Competition	BMW M4 GT3 Evo	BMW P58 3.0 L Twin Turbo I6	991	B	(United Kingdom) Toby Sowery	5
(United Kingdom) Paradine Competition	BMW M4 GT3 Evo	BMW P58 3.0 L Twin Turbo I6	992	S	(United Kingdom) Charles Clark	All
(United Kingdom) Paradine Competition	BMW M4 GT3 Evo	BMW P58 3.0 L Twin Turbo I6	992	S	(Brazil) Pedro Ebrahim	All
(United Kingdom) Paradine Competition	BMW M4 GT3 Evo	BMW P58 3.0 L Twin Turbo I6	992	S	(United Kingdom) James Kellett	All
(United Kingdom) Paradine Competition	BMW M4 GT3 Evo	BMW P58 3.0 L Twin Turbo I6	992	S	(Netherlands) Maxime Oosten	5

Icon	Class
P	Pro (Overall)
G	Gold Cup
S	Silver Cup
B	Bronze Cup
PA	Pro-Am Cup

=== Driver and team changes ===
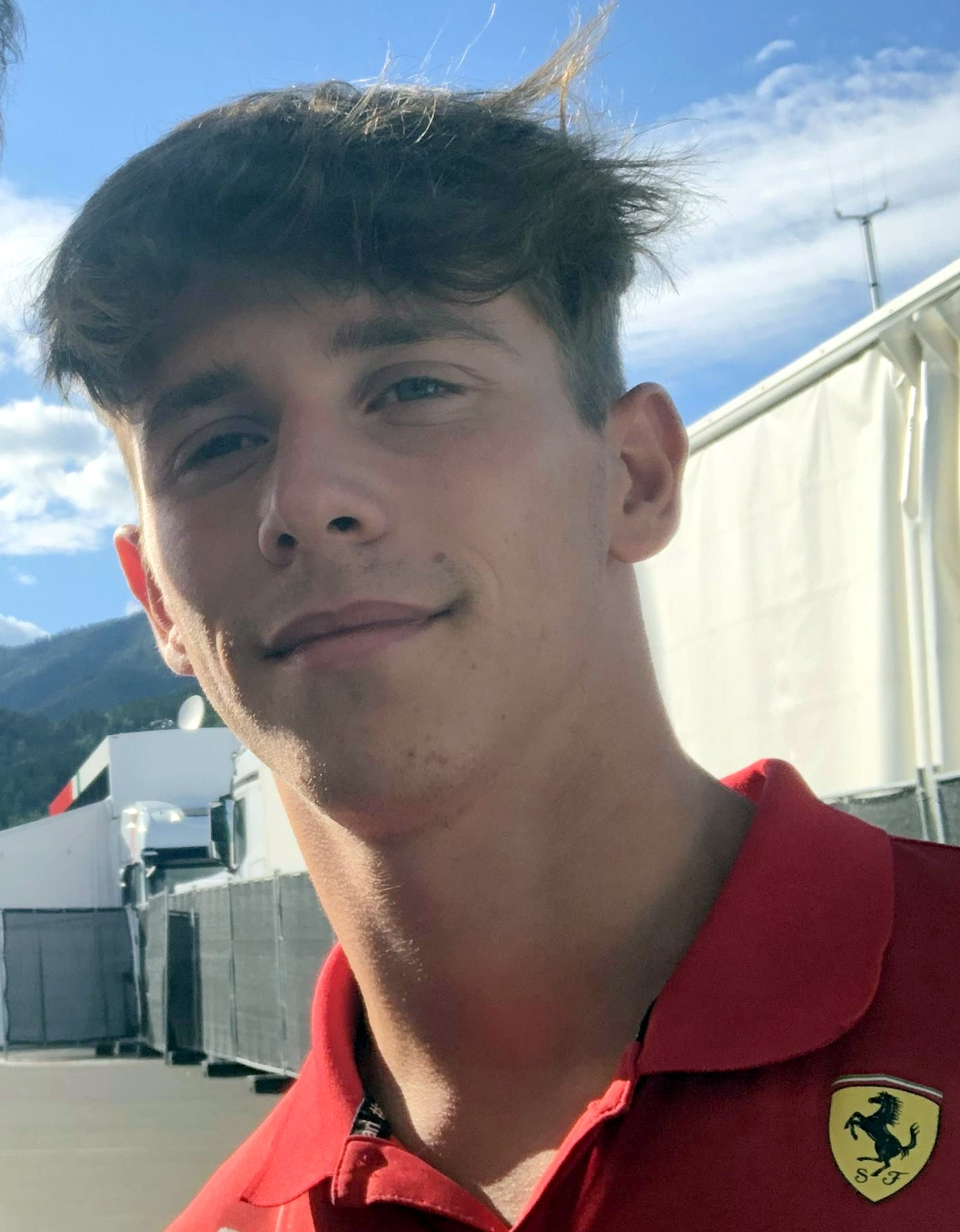
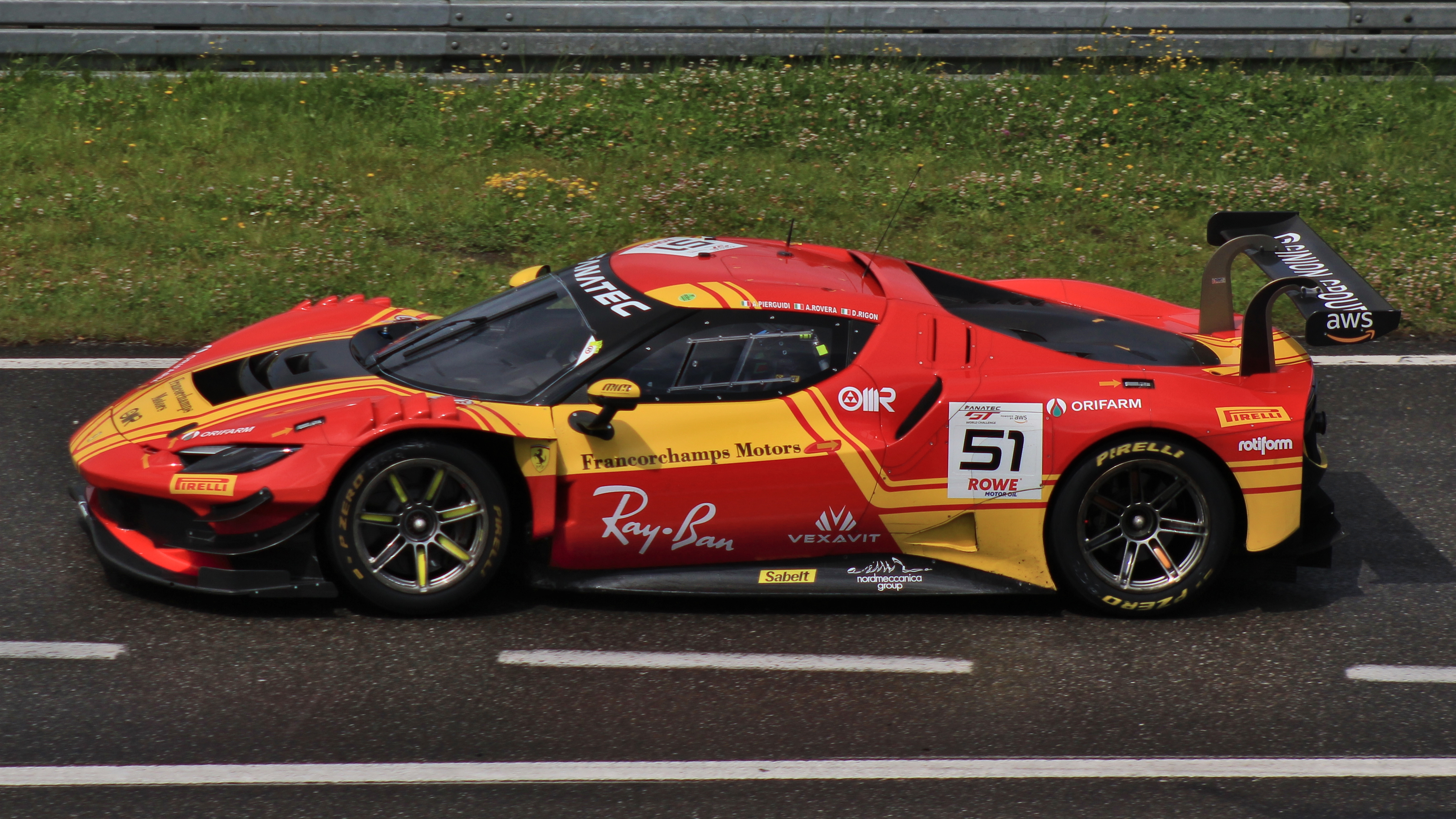
Arthur Leclerc, a former Formula 2 driver and current F1 development driver for Scuderia Ferrari, made his championship debut with AF Corse in the Ferrari 296 GT3 at Circuit Paul Ricard.

Mercedes-AMG made a factory-supported push for the overall championship in 2025, with Team Mann-Filter's Maro Engel and Lucas Auer defending their title in the No. 48 car. Maxime Martin joined Mercedes-AMG, racing the No. 9 for Boutsen VDS throughout the season. AF Corse led Ferrari's full-season effort with two Pro cars, featuring Arthur Leclerc as the full-season driver of the No. 50. In the sister No. 51 car, Alessio Rovera and Vincent Abril competed for the entire season. Rutronik Racing's Patric Niederhauser and Sven Müller returned in 2025, leading Porsche's charge for the overall title in the No. 96.

Team WRT was also back with Charles Weerts competing for the overall championship in the No. 32 alongside Kelvin van der Linde, who stepped in for series veteran Dries Vanthoor. After sitting out 2024 in the overall championship, Lamborghini returned with Grasser Racing for a full-season entry with Jordan Pepper and Luca Engstler piloting the whole season in the No. 63 car. For McLaren, Garage 59 fielded Marvin Kirchhöfer and Benjamin Goethe for the entire season in the No. 59. Lastly, Walkenhorst Motorsport's Henrique Chaves raced the whole season in the No. 34/35 (Endurance/Sprint) Aston Martin.

In the Gold Cup, AlManer Racing by WRT featured the No. 777 BMW, driven by Al Faisal Al Zubair and Jens Klingmann. Audi made a comeback with the No. 88 Tresor Attempto Racing car, driven by Sebastian Øgaard at all rounds. Garage 59 also fielded a full-season Gold Cup entry with their No. 58, piloted by Louis Prette at every round.

In the Silver Cup, Paradine Competition (No. 992) and Team WRT (No. 30) returned with full-season BMW entries, the latter fielding Gilles Stadsbader at all races. Comtoyou Racing's No. 21 Aston Martin alongside Audis from Saintéloc Racing and Tresor Attempto Racing's No. 99 were also entered as full-season Silver Cup entries. Additionally, Boutsen VDS's No. 10 and Grasser Racing's No. 19 joined the Silver Cup alongside their overall Pro competitors.

In the Bronze Cup, 2024 class champions Tempesta Racing returned with Eddie Cheever III continuing as a full-season entry for his seventh consecutive year. Paradine Competition's No. 991, Kessel Racing's No. 74, and Audis from QMMF by Saintéloc Racing (No. 77) and Tressor Attempto Racing (No. 66) were all entered as full-season Bronze entries. Additionally, Lionspeed GP entered their No. 80 Porsche at all rounds in 2025. Finally, Winward Racing (No. 81) also competed in the Bronze Cup alongside their overall Pro entry.

== Regulation changes ==
=== Technical regulations ===
==== Tyre changes ====
SRO Motorsports Group adopted Pirelli's new P Zero DHG tyres for the 2025 season. The slick racing tyres offer improved performance, faster warm-up, and greater consistency over long distances. They also feature FSC-certified natural rubber. The DHG replaced the DHF, which had been used globally for 3 years. Pirelli, SRO's exclusive tyre supplier since 2013, will continue its partnership until at least 2028.

== Season summary ==
=== Pre-season ===
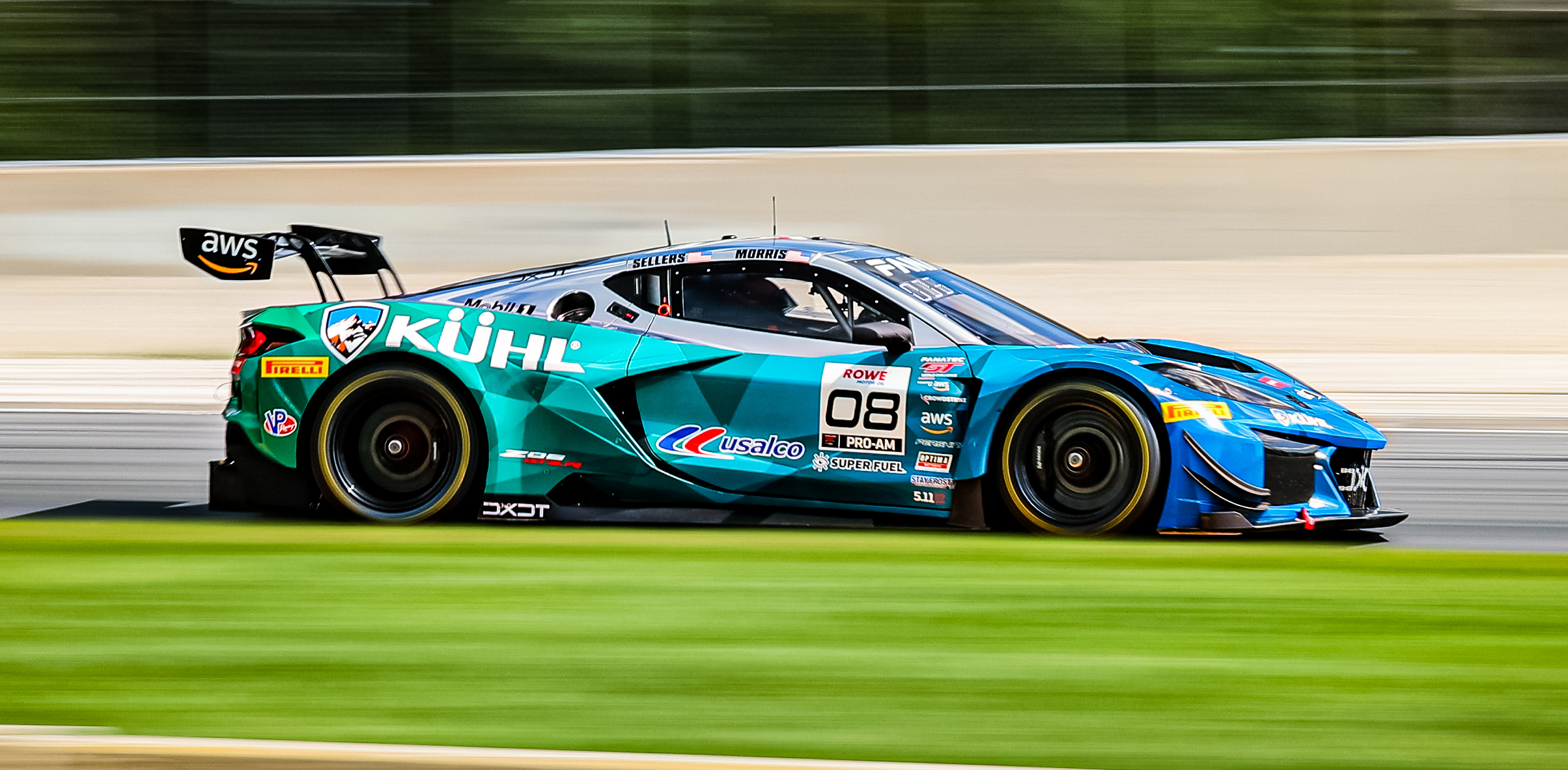
The Chevrolet Corvette Z06 GT3.R made its championship debut in 2025. Steller Motorsport entered it in both the Sprint Cup and the Endurance Cup.

The 2025 GT World Challenge Europe featured strong entries in both the Sprint Cup and Endurance Cup, with record-breaking Endurance Cup entries expected to increase during the 24 Hours of Spa. The Sprint Cup was expected to feature a grid of over 40 cars, but the Bronze Cup didn't participate in the opening round at Brands Hatch, resulting in a smaller entry. Manufacturer participation also grew to ten brands, with Chevrolet Corvette returning for the first time since 2014. Stéphane Ratel, CEO of SRO Motorsports Group, noted the series’ growth and new team additions, underscoring the appeal of GT3 racing, which is nearing its 20th anniversary.

=== Opening rounds ===
In the opening race, BMW won at Circuit Paul Ricard as Team WRT’s No. 32 car advanced from ninth on the grid to clinch the six-hour endurance event. Charles Weerts, Ugo De Wilde, and Kelvin van der Linde shared driving duties, with Van der Linde executing a crucial overtake on the leading No. 96 Rutronik Porsche to secure victory by 4.3 seconds. This marked a successful debut for the new M4 GT3 EVO model. Porsche also performed strongly, achieving a double podium with its No. 96 and No. 22 entries. The top seven included Mercedes-AMG, Aston Martin, another BMW, and McLaren. Class winners were CSA Racing’s No. 111 McLaren in the Gold Cup, Paradine Competition’s No. 992 BMW in the Silver Cup, and Kessel Racing’s No. 74 Ferrari in the Bronze Cup. The race had minimal incidents, with no safety car deployments and only four retirements from a competitive 59-car field.

AF Corse – Francorchamps Motors won the first sprint race at Brands Hatch, where just eight seconds separated the top nine finishers. Alessio Rovera and Vincent Abril triumphed in the No. 51 Ferrari, narrowly beating the No. 59 Garage 59 McLaren by 0.658 seconds, thanks to a superb pit stop. Ferrari excelled throughout the weekend, capturing the Gold Cup with the No. 69 Emil Frey Racing Ferrari and the Silver Cup after the No. 52 AF Corse Ferrari was promoted post-race due to the No. 97 Rutronik Porsche's penalty. All 30 cars finished incident-free in a clean, safety car-free race.^{[1]} Maro Engel and Lucas Auer dominated the second sprint, leading from pole in the No. 48 Team Mann-Filter Mercedes-AMG. They maintained their lead, fending off a strong challenge from Weerts in the No. 32 Team WRT BMW, to win by 1.3 seconds. Auer executed a clean restart after two full-course yellow periods. The No. 96 Rutronik Porsche finished third, attributed to a strong pit stop and solid driving from Patric Niederhauser and Sven Müller. The races showcased the season's intense competitiveness, with various brands and crews on the podium. Gold Cup honours went to AlManar Racing’s No. 777 BMW, while Boutsen VDS’s No. 10 Mercedes-AMG won the Silver Cup.

Niederhauser and Müller won the first Zandvoort race for Rutronik Racing, starting third and executing a flawless strategy. A safety car was deployed after collisions involving the No. 64 HRT Ford and No. 14 Emil Frey Ferrari. Niederhauser handed over to Müller early during the pit window, gaining track position as Engel struggled with a 5-second penalty for an unsafe release. Jordan Pepper in the No. 63 Lamborghini finished second, while Engel salvaged third. The No. 25 Saintéloc Racing Audi finished fourth, winning the Gold Cup. The No. 99 Tresor Attempto Audi claimed the Silver Cup. In the Bronze Cup, Buus and Bashar Mardini claimed honours on Lionspeed’s Sprint debut, fending off Darren Leung.^{[1]} In Race 2, Team WRT’s Weerts and van der Linde secured victory thanks to a 48.2-second pit stop, propelling their No. 32 BMW from sixth to first. Grasser Racing’s No. 63 Lamborghini, driven by Pepper and Luca Engstler, initially looked strong but faltered during the pit window. Ivan Klymenko secured second overall and a dominant Silver Cup win. The No. 63 Lamborghini finished third, marking its second podium of the weekend. In the Gold Cup, Thierry Vermeulen and Lulham won in the No. 69 Emil Frey Ferrari, overcoming a 10-second penalty. In the Bronze Cup, Kessel Racing triumphed with Dustin Blattner and Dennis Marschall, starting from class pole.

Mercedes-AMG Team Mann-Filter’s No. 48 crew of Matteo Cairoli, Maro Engel, and Lucas Auer claimed overall victory at the fourth round at Monza, marking the brand’s first-ever Endurance Cup win at the venue. The crew were trailing the No. 17 Mercedes-AMG of Jules Gounon for much of the race. However, a well-timed pit stop during a full-course yellow proved decisive for the eventual winners. The No. 17 would eventually retire from second after the front-right wheel came loose. This allowed the No. 59 Garage 59 entry to secure second, earning their first Endurance Cup podium in seven years, while the No. 7 Comtoyou Racing Aston Martin completed the top three. BMW teams triumphed in the Gold and Silver Cup. The No. 777 AlManar Racing by WRT car was able to move up from 28th on the grid to take an impressive fourth overall, alongside the Gold Cup win. In Silver, the Century Motorsport BMW would execute another clean race to secure Silver Cup honours. Despite running with just two drivers, Rutronik Racing’s No. 97 Porsche took Bronze Cup honours.

=== 24 Hours of Spa ===
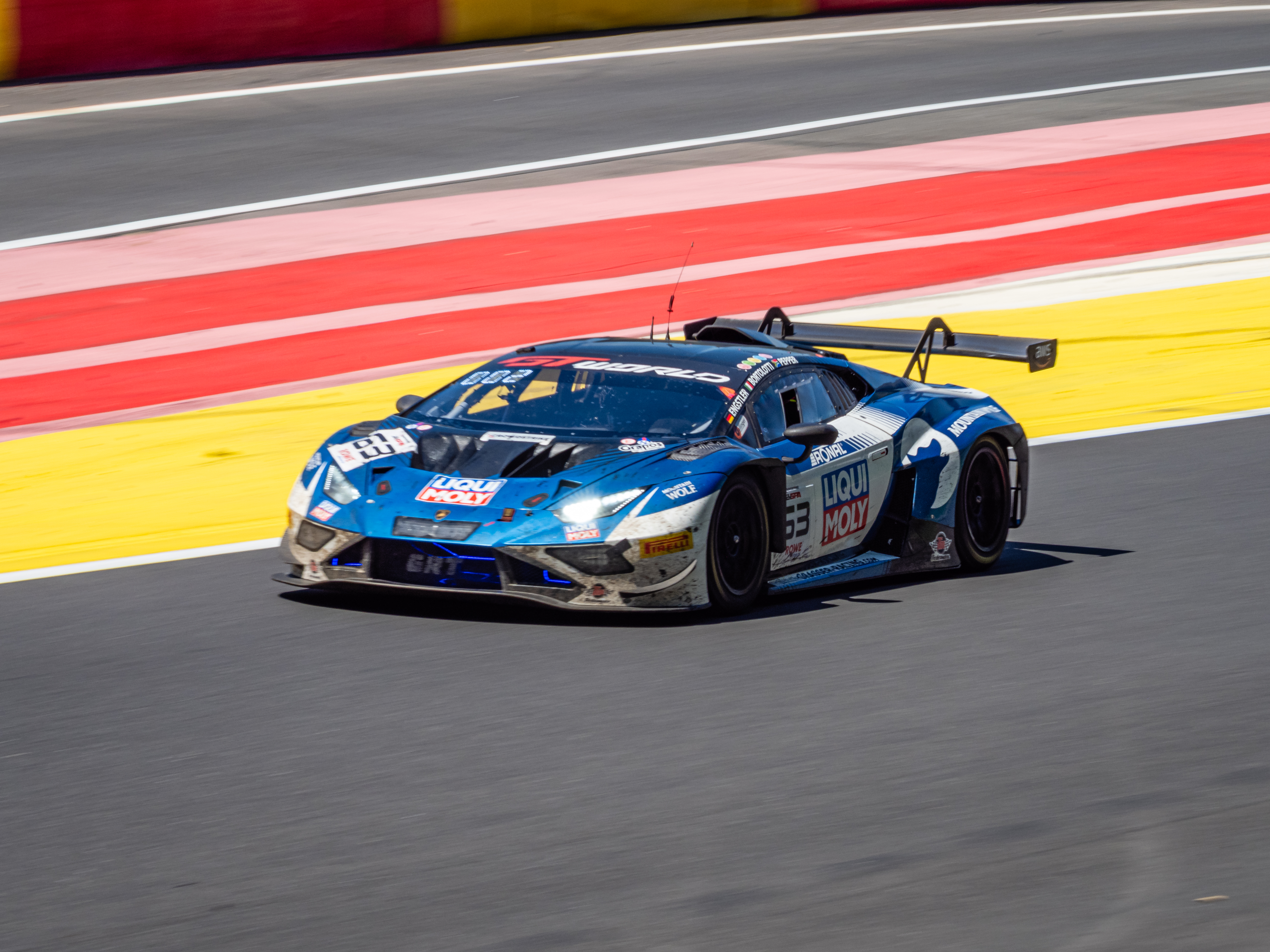
The No. 63 Grasser Racing Team - GRT Lamborghini Huracán GT3 Evo 2 that took victory at the 2025 24 Hours of Spa.

Lamborghini achieved its first-ever victory at the 2025 24 Hours of Spa, with Grasser Racing’s Mirko Bortolotti, Pepper, and Engstler delivering a flawless performance in the No. 63 Huracan GT3 EVO2. In a dramatic finish, they narrowly beat the No. 96 Rutronik Racing Porsche by 8.7 seconds after a tense final stint. Despite a slow final pit stop, Bortolotti managed to resist pressure from Niederhauser, aided by decisive moves through traffic. The No. 51 AF Corse Ferrari rounded off the podium after an incredible comeback from 65th due to early technical issues. In other classes, Verstappen.com Racing's Aston Martin won the Gold Cup after a late puncture caused the leading McLaren to drop back, Walkenhorst Motorsport took Silver Cup honours, Kessel Racing triumphed in Bronze Cup, and AV Racing by Car Collection secured Pro-Am victory on their emotional debut. The event attracted 128,000 fans over five days, making Lamborghini the sixth different winner in as many years.

=== Mid-season rounds ===
Valentino Rossi and Raffaele Marciello won the dramatic first Sprint Cup race at Misano. Racing in the No. 46 BMW, they edged out the No. 51 AF Corse Ferrari after a close contest. The Ferrari, driven by Rovera and Abril, led early from pole, with Rossi initially third after a personal best qualifying. The crucial moment came at pit stops, where Team WRT gained on their rivals. Marciello then chased Abril, closing a three-second gap to make a decisive overtake and win. The Gold Cup Garage 59 McLaren took class victory whilst the No. 99 Tresor Attempto Racing Audi took victory in the Silver Cup. In the Bronze Cup, Marschall and Blattner in the No. 74 Kessel Ferrari dominated, winning comfortably over Paradine’s No. 991 BMW.^{[1]} Garage 59 achieved McLaren’s first Sprint Cup win since 2016 with Marvin Kirchhöfer and Benjamin Goethe in race two. The race saw Kirchhöfer pressured by Marciello, then interrupted by a fiery crash that brought out a red flag. After the restart, Kirchhöfer held firm, with Goethe rejoining ahead of Rossi. Marciello had received a penalty, dropping the No. 46 BMW out of contention. Auer in the No. 48 Mercedes charged late, almost catching Goethe, who held on by half a second to win, ending McLaren’s nine-year drought. The No. 96 Porsche finished third. Class wins came from the No. 69 Emil Frey Ferrari, No. 21 Comtoyou Aston Martin, and No. 85 Imperiale Lamborghini.

Grasser Racing claimed its first Sprint Cup victory since 2018, as Engstler and Pepper guided the No. 63 Lamborghini to triumph at Magny-Cours in race one. Starting from pole, Engstler maintained the lead before a slow tyre change allowed the No. 96 Rutronik Porsche to move ahead briefly, but Pepper fought back with a decisive move at Chateau d’Eau to secure the win. The No. 32 WRT BMW completed the podium thanks to an early pit stop strategy. In the classes, the No. 58 Garage 59 McLaren clinched its second Gold Cup win, Comtoyou Racing’s No. 21 Aston Martin secured back-to-back Silver Cup victories, and Lionspeed GP’s No. 89 Porsche achieved the Bronze Cup win.^{[1]} In race two, McLaren scored its second Sprint Cup win in as many weeks as Garage 59’s Kirchhöfer and Goethe triumphed, following their Misano success to become the first repeat winners of 2025 in the Sprint Cup. Starting from pole, Kirchhöfer held off Pepper’s No. 63 Grasser Lamborghini before Goethe absorbed relentless pressure from Engstler in the closing stages, ultimately crossing the line just 0.156s ahead in the closest finish of the season, leading the WRT BMW crew of van der Linde and Weerts, who finished third. In the classes, Saintéloc Racing’s Audi inherited Gold Cup victory after the Emil Frey Ferrari was knocked out through a collision. Comtoyou Racing achieved a third straight win. In the Bronze Cup, the No. 81 Winward Mercedes of Rinat Salikhov and Marvin Dienst secured victory.

ROWE Racing achieved a landmark home victory for BMW in the Nürburgring Endurance Cup round, marking their first overall win in Germany. The No. 98 BMW driven by Marciello, Augusto Farfus, and Jesse Krohn triumphed from pole position after a decisive full-course yellow disrupted the race and shifted it away from the leading No. 7 Comtoyou Aston Martin. Marciello managed the final stint effectively to secure the win. The No. 48 Mann-Filter Mercedes-AMG finished in second place, while Rutronik Racing’s No. 96 Porsche completed the podium after recovering from early setbacks. The No. 22 Schumacher CLRT Porsche and No. 63 Grasser Lamborghini rounded out the top five. The No. 64 HRT Mustang impressed with a third-place finish on the road but was relegated to sixth following a penalty, still representing its best result to date. In the class categories, AlManar Racing by WRT’s No. 777 BMW inherited the Gold Cup victory after Verstappen.com Racing was penalised. Boutsen VDS took Silver Cup honours with its No. 10 Mercedes-AMG, again helped by post-race penalties. In the Bronze Cup, Kessel Racing’s Ferrari lost what was likely to be a win after a spin, handing victory to 2 Seas Motorsport's No. 222 Mercedes-AMG.

=== Closing rounds ===
At Circuit Ricardo Tormo’s penultimate season round, Pepper and Engstler won race one. An incident-filled first lap eliminated many front-runners, including the No. 32 BMW and No. 59 McLaren. After pit stops, the No. 69 Emil Frey Ferrari of Vermeulen and Lulham led, but a post-race penalty promoted the No. 63 Lamborghini to first. The No. 58 Garage 59 McLaren took the Gold Cup win after finishing second overall, with the No. 48 Mercedes-AMG third. Silver Cup honours went to the No. 30 Team WRT BMW, and the Bronze Cup win went to the No. 74 Kessel Racing Ferrari. In race two, after retiring in race one, the No. 32 BMW won, narrowly ahead of the No. 63 Lamborghini and No. 59 McLaren, after decisive overtakes from van der Linde. The No. 69 Ferrari won in the Gold Cup and claimed the title, while Silver Cup honours went to the No. 10 Boutsen VDS Mercedes-AMG, with Mex Jansen just 2 points behind heading into the final round. Kessel Racing’s No. 74 won the Bronze Cup title after finishing third, with the No. 89 Lionspeed GP Porsche winning the race in class.

Circuit de Barcelona-Catalunya hosted the season finale, featuring an exciting event that awarded the overall and Silver Cup titles. After recovering from twenty-first on the grid, the No. 32 Team WRT BMW would finish in sixth place, clinching the overall championship for Weerts and van der Linde, with the No. 48 Mercedes-AMG Mann Filter failing to score points. Nevertheless, at the end of the race, it was the No. 58 Garage 59 Gold Cup car that took overall victory, having dominated despite complicated safety car and full-course yellow periods. The No. 777 AlManar Racing by WRT BMW, also in the Gold Cup, would achieve second place overall, with the ROWE Racing BMW finishing third. Ending a difficult season with a good result saw the No. 50 AF Corse Ferrari finish fourth, with the No. 99 Tresor Attempto Racing Audi completing the top five and taking first place in the Silver Cup. Despite not winning, the No. 10 Boutsen VDS Mercedes-AMG’s third place in class was enough to secure the championship for Aurèlien Panis and César Gazeau, with title rival Jansen finishing in fifth in class. Finally, the No. 97 Rutronik Racing Porsche of Loek Hartog, Antares Au and Morris Schuring took the win in the Bronze Cup.

== Results and standings ==
=== Race results ===
Rnd.		Circuit	Overall winners	Gold winners	Silver winners	Bronze winners
1		(France) Circuit Paul Ricard	(Belgium) No. 32 Team WRT	(France) No. 111 CSA Racing	(United Kingdom) No. 992 Paradine Competition	(Switzerland) No. 74 Kessel Racing
1		(France) Circuit Paul Ricard	(South Africa) Kelvin van der Linde (Belgium) Charles Weerts (Belgium) Ugo De Wilde	(France) Simon Gachet (United Kingdom) James Kell (France) Arthur Rougier	(United Kingdom) Charles Clark (Brazil) Pedro Ebrahim (United Kingdom) James Kellett	(United States) Dustin Blattner (Denmark) Conrad Laursen (Germany) Dennis Marschall
2	R1	(United Kingdom) Brands Hatch	(Italy) No. 51 AF Corse - Francorchamps Motors	(Switzerland) No. 69 Emil Frey Racing	(Italy) No. 52 AF Corse - Francorchamps Motors	Did not participate
2	R1	(United Kingdom) Brands Hatch	(Monaco) Vincent Abril (Italy) Alessio Rovera	(United Kingdom) Chris Lulham (Netherlands) Thierry Vermeulen	(Belgium) Jef Machiels (Argentina) Marcos Siebert	Did not participate
2	R2	(United Kingdom) Brands Hatch	(United States) No. 48 Mercedes-AMG Team Mann-Filter	(Oman) No. 777 AlManar Racing by WRT	(Belgium) No. 10 Boutsen VDS	Did not participate
2	R2	(United Kingdom) Brands Hatch	(Austria) Lucas Auer (Germany) Maro Engel	(Oman) Al Faisal Al Zubair (Germany) Jens Klingmann	(France) César Gazeau (France) Aurélien Panis	Did not participate
3	R1	(Netherlands) Zandvoort	(Germany) No. 96 Rutronik Racing	(France) No. 25 Saintéloc Racing	(Italy) No. 99 Tresor Attempto Racing	(Germany) No. 89 Lionspeed GP
3	R1	(Netherlands) Zandvoort	(Germany) Sven Müller (Switzerland) Patric Niederhauser	(France) Paul Evrard (Belgium) Gilles Magnus	(Germany) Alex Aka (Argentina) Ezequiel Pérez Companc	(Denmark) Bastian Buus (Canada) Bashar Mardini
3	R2	(Netherlands) Zandvoort	(Belgium) No. 32 Team WRT	(Switzerland) No. 69 Emil Frey Racing	(Italy) No. 99 Tresor Attempto Racing	(Switzerland) No. 74 Kessel Racing
3	R2	(Netherlands) Zandvoort	(South Africa) Kelvin van der Linde (Belgium) Charles Weerts	(United Kingdom) Chris Lulham (Netherlands) Thierry Vermeulen	(Germany) Alex Aka (Argentina) Ezequiel Pérez Companc	(United States) Dustin Blattner (Germany) Dennis Marschall
4		(Italy) Monza	(United States) No. 48 Mercedes-AMG Team Mann-Filter	(Oman) No. 777 AlManar Racing by WRT	(United Kingdom) No. 42 Century Motorsport	(Germany) No. 97 Rutronik Racing
4		(Italy) Monza	(Austria) Lucas Auer (Italy) Matteo Cairoli (Germany) Maro Engel	(Oman) Al Faisal Al Zubair (Germany) Jens Klingmann (United Kingdom) Ben Tuck	(Netherlands) Mex Jansen (United Kingdom) Will Moore (South Africa) Jarrod Waberski	(Hong Kong) Antares Au (Netherlands) Loek Hartog
5		(Belgium) Spa	(Austria) No. 63 GRT - Grasser Racing Team	(Netherlands) No. 33 Verstappen.com Racing	(Germany) No. 35 Walkenhorst Motorsport	(Switzerland) No. 74 Kessel Racing
5		(Belgium) Spa	(Italy) Mirko Bortolotti (Germany) Luca Engstler (South Africa) Jordan Pepper	(United Kingdom) Harry King (United Kingdom) Chris Lulham (Netherlands) Thierry Vermeulen	(France) Romain Leroux (Sweden) Oliver Söderström (Ecuador) Mateo Villagomez	(United States) Dustin Blattner (Denmark) Conrad Laursen (Germany) Dennis Marschall (Canada) Zacharie Robichon
6	R1	(Italy) Misano	(Belgium) No. 46 Team WRT	(United Kingdom) No. 58 Garage 59	(Italy) No. 99 Tresor Attempto Racing	(Switzerland) No. 74 Kessel Racing
6	R1	(Italy) Misano	(Switzerland) Raffaele Marciello (Italy) Valentino Rossi	(United Kingdom) Thomas Fleming (Monaco) Louis Prette	(Germany) Alex Aka (Argentina) Ezequiel Pérez Companc	(United States) Dustin Blattner (Germany) Dennis Marschall
6	R2	(Italy) Misano	(United Kingdom) No. 59 Garage 59	(Switzerland) No. 69 Emil Frey Racing	(Belgium) No. 21 Comtoyou Racing	(Italy) No. 85 Imperiale Racing
6	R2	(Italy) Misano	(Germany) Benjamin Goethe (Germany) Marvin Kirchhöfer	(United Kingdom) Chris Lulham (Netherlands) Thierry Vermeulen	(United Arab Emirates) Jamie Day (Belgium) Kobe Pauwels	Dmitry Gvazava (Italy) Loris Spinelli
7	R1	(France) Magny-Cours	(Austria) No. 63 GRT - Grasser Racing Team	(United Kingdom) No. 58 Garage 59	(Belgium) No. 21 Comtoyou Racing	(Germany) No. 89 Lionspeed GP
7	R1	(France) Magny-Cours	(Germany) Luca Engstler (South Africa) Jordan Pepper	(United Kingdom) Thomas Fleming (Monaco) Louis Prette	(United Arab Emirates) Jamie Day (Belgium) Kobe Pauwels	(Denmark) Bastian Buus (Canada) Bashar Mardini
7	R2	(France) Magny-Cours	(United Kingdom) No. 59 Garage 59	(France) No. 25 Saintéloc Racing	(Belgium) No. 21 Comtoyou Racing	(United States) No. 81 Winward Racing
7	R2	(France) Magny-Cours	(Germany) Benjamin Goethe (Germany) Marvin Kirchhöfer	(France) Paul Evrard (Belgium) Gilles Magnus	(United Arab Emirates) Jamie Day (Belgium) Kobe Pauwels	(Germany) Marvin Dienst; Rinat Salikhov
8		(Germany) Nürburgring	(Germany) No. 98 ROWE Racing	(Oman) No. 777 AlManar Racing by WRT	(Belgium) No. 10 Boutsen VDS	(Bahrain) No. 222 2 Seas Motorsport
8		(Germany) Nürburgring	(Brazil) Augusto Farfus (Finland) Jesse Krohn (Switzerland) Raffaele Marciello	(Oman) Al Faisal Al Zubair (Germany) Jens Klingmann (United Kingdom) Ben Tuck	(France) Loris Cabirou (France) César Gazeau (France) Aurélien Panis	(United Kingdom) Ben Barnicoat (United Kingdom) Charles Dawson (United Kingdom) Thomas Lebbon
9	R1	(Spain) Valencia	(Austria) No. 63 GRT - Grasser Racing Team	(United Kingdom) No. 58 Garage 59	(Belgium) No. 30 Team WRT	(Switzerland) No. 74 Kessel Racing
9	R1	(Spain) Valencia	(Germany) Luca Engstler (South Africa) Jordan Pepper	(United Kingdom) Thomas Fleming (Monaco) Louis Prette	(Belgium) Matisse Lismont (Belgium) Gilles Stadsbader	(United States) Dustin Blattner (Germany) Dennis Marschall
9	R2	(Spain) Valencia	(Belgium) No. 32 Team WRT	(Switzerland) No. 69 Emil Frey Racing	(Belgium) No. 10 Boutsen VDS	(Germany) No. 89 Lionspeed GP
9	R2	(Spain) Valencia	(South Africa) Kelvin van der Linde (Belgium) Charles Weerts	(United Kingdom) Chris Lulham (Netherlands) Thierry Vermeulen	(France) César Gazeau (France) Aurélien Panis	(Denmark) Bastian Buus (Canada) Bashar Mardini
10		(Spain) Barcelona	(United Kingdom) No. 58 Garage 59	(United Kingdom) No. 58 Garage 59	(Germany) No. 99 Tresor Attempto Racing	(Germany) No. 97 Rutronik Racing
10		(Spain) Barcelona	(United Kingdom) Dean MacDonald (Monaco) Louis Prette (United Kingdom) Adam Smalley	(United Kingdom) Dean MacDonald (Monaco) Louis Prette (United Kingdom) Adam Smalley	(Germany) Alex Aka (Italy) Leonardo Moncini (Denmark) Sebastian Øgaard	(Hong Kong) Antares Au (Netherlands) Loek Hartog (Netherlands) Morris Schuring

=== Scoring system ===
Championship points are awarded for the first ten positions in each race. The pole-sitter in each class also receives one point and entries are required to complete 75% of the winning car's race distance in order to be classified and earn points. Individual drivers are required to participate for a minimum of 25 minutes in order to earn championship points in any race. In the teams' standings, only the best-placed car for each team is classified.

Sprint Cup points

Position	1st	2nd	3rd	4th	5th	6th	7th	8th	9th	10th	Pole
Points	16.5	12	9.5	7.5	6	4.5	3	2	1	0.5	1

Monza, Nürburgring and Barcelona points

Position	1st	2nd	3rd	4th	5th	6th	7th	8th	9th	10th	Pole
Points	25	18	15	12	10	8	6	4	2	1	1

Paul Ricard points

Position	1st	2nd	3rd	4th	5th	6th	7th	8th	9th	10th	Pole
Points	33	24	19	15	12	9	6	4	2	1	1

24 Hours of Spa points

Points are awarded after six hours, after twelve hours and at the finish.

Position	1st	2nd	3rd	4th	5th	6th	7th	8th	9th	10th
Points after 6hrs/12hrs	12	9	7	6	5	4	3	2	1	0
Points at the finish	25	18	15	12	10	8	6	4	2	1

Additionally, points are awarded to the top 3 in Superpole.

Position	1st	2nd	3rd
Points	3	2	1

=== Drivers' Championship standings ===
Drivers compete for their respective GT World Challenge Powered by AWS championships which are split into Overall, Gold, Silver and Bronze titles.

==== Overall Drivers' standings ====
Pos.	Drivers	Team	LEC (France)	BRH (United Kingdom)		ZAN (Netherlands)		MNZ (Italy)	SPA (Belgium)			MIS (Italy)		MAG (France)		NÜR (Germany)	VAL (Spain)		BAR (Spain)	Points
Pos.	Drivers	Team	LEC (France)	S1	S2	S1	S2	MNZ (Italy)	6hrs	12hrs	24hrs	S1	S2	S1	S2	NÜR (Germany)	S1	S2	BAR (Spain)	Points
1	(South Africa) Kelvin van der Linde (Belgium) Charles Weerts	(Belgium) Team WRT	1	7	2	5	1	5	7	9	7	3	5	3	3	10^{P}	Ret	1	6	151.5
2	(Austria) Lucas Auer (Germany) Maro Engel	(United States) Mercedes-AMG Team Mann-Filter	4^{P}	6	1^{P}	3	9	1	2	7	10	4	2	4	7	2	3	6	13	148.5
3	(Germany) Sven Müller (Switzerland) Patric Niederhauser	(Germany) Rutronik Racing	2	9	3	1	5	21	4	6	2	7	3	2	5	3	14	5	7	142.5
4	(Germany) Luca Engstler (South Africa) Jordan Pepper	(Austria) GRT - Grasser Racing Team	12	24	16	2	3	46†	23	2	1	9	11	1^{P}	2	5	1	2^{P}	16	125.5
5	(Germany) Benjamin Goethe (Germany) Marvin Kirchofer	(United Kingdom) Garage 59	Ret	2	6	6	4	2	22	4	6^{P}	5	1^{P}	9	1^{P}	8	Ret	3	Ret	119
6	(Switzerland) Raffaele Marciello	(Germany) ROWE Racing	7					Ret	8	8	5					1			3	76.5
6	(Switzerland) Raffaele Marciello	(Belgium) Team WRT										1	21							76.5
7	(Belgium) Alessio Picariello	(Germany) Rutronik Racing	2					21	4	6	2					3			7	73
8	(Italy) Matteo Cairoli	(United States) Mercedes-AMG Team Mann-Filter	4^{P}					1	2	7	10					2			13	72
9	(Monaco) Vincent Abril (Italy) Alessio Rovera	(Italy) AF Corse - Francorchamps Motors	15	1	19	Ret	14	49†	12	3	3	2^{P}	4	Ret	4	46	20	16	33	66.5
10	(Belgium) Ugo De Wilde	(Belgium) Team WRT	1					5	7	9	7					10^{P}			6	63
11	(Brazil) Augusto Farfus	(Germany) ROWE Racing	7					Ret	8	8	5					1			3	60
11	(Brazil) Augusto Farfus	(United Kingdom) Paradine Competition				19	31													60
=	(Finland) Jesse Krohn	(Germany) ROWE Racing	7					Ret	8	8	5					1			3	60
12	(Monaco) Arthur Leclerc	(Italy) AF Corse - Francochamps Motors	16	5	4	9	Ret	43†	5	5	4	Ret	24	12	10	DNS	8	19	4	51
13	(Monaco) Louis Prette	(United Kingdom) Garage 59	Ret	8	15	Ret	25	Ret	28	15	12	10	19	6	14	Ret	2	15	1^{P}	45
14	(Italy) Mirko Bortolotti	(Austria) GRT - Grasser Racing Team	12					46†	23	2	1					5			16	44
15	(Turkey) Ayhancan Güven	(France) Schumacher CLRT	3					6	73†	73†	Ret					4			9	41
16	(United Kingdom) Joseph Loake	(United Kingdom) Garage 59	Ret					2	22	4	6					8			Ret	39
17	(Italy) Mattia Drudi (Denmark) Marco Sørensen (Denmark) Nicki Thiim	(Belgium) Comtoyou Racing	5					3	6	62†	Ret					7			34	37
18	(Oman) Al Faisal Al Zubair (Germany) Jens Klingmann	(Oman) AlManar Racing by WRT	10	19	8	12	18	4	17	21	20	Ret	20	13	17	12	9	10	2	34.5
19	(Italy) Eliseo Donno (Italy) Antonio Fuoco	(Italy) AF Corse - Francochamps Motors	16					43†	5	5	4					DNS			4	34
20	(Germany) Luca Stolz	(Germany) Mercedes-AMG Team GetSpeed	13					48†^{P}	1	60†	Ret^{2}					22			14	32.5
20	(Germany) Luca Stolz	(Belgium) Boutsen VDS		21	20	8	10					18	6	5	6		30	13		32.5
21	(United Kingdom) Ben Tuck	(Oman) AlManar Racing by WRT	10					4	17	21	20					12			2	31
22	(United Kingdom) Chris Lulham (Netherlands) Thierry Vermeulen	(Netherlands) Verstappen.com Racing	9					15	11	10	9					17			8	31
22	(United Kingdom) Chris Lulham (Netherlands) Thierry Vermeulen	(Switzerland) Emil Frey Racing		3^{P}	9	11	13					Ret	7	22	26		4	9		31
23	(Germany) Laurin Heinrich	(France) Schumacher CLRT	3						73†	73†	Ret					4				31
=	(Austria) Klaus Bachler	(France) Schumacher CLRT	3						73†	73†	Ret					4				31
=	(Austria) Klaus Bachler	(Austria) Razoon - more than racing										33	23							31
24	(United Kingdom) Adam Smalley	(United Kingdom) Garage 59	Ret	8	15	Ret	25	Ret	28	15	12					Ret			1^{P}	28
25	(United Kingdom) Dean MacDonald	(United Kingdom) Garage 59	Ret					Ret	28	15	12					Ret			1^{P}	26
26	(Italy) Alessandro Pier Guidi	(Italy) AF Corse - Francorchamps Motors	15					49†	12	3	3					46				22
27	(Germany) Alex Aka	(Germany) Tresor Attempto Racing	23	23	11	10	6	13	16	61†	Ret	6	30	Ret	21	Ret	Ret	12	5	19.5
28	(United Kingdom) Ben Green (Finland) Konsta Lappalainen	(Switzerland) Emil Frey Racing		4	5	Ret	11^{P}					8	15	8	13		12	Ret		18.5
29	(Belgium) Maxime Martin	(Belgium) Boutsen VDS	28	21	20	8	10	Ret	39	65†	Ret^{3}	18	6	5	6	13	30	13	Ret	18.5
30	(United Kingdom) Thomas Fleming	(United Kingdom) Garage 59	54					17	49	22	22	10	19	6	14	18	2	15	36	17
31	(France) Thomas Neubauer	(Italy) AF Corse - Francochamps Motors		5	4	9	Ret					Ret	24	12	10		8	19		17
32	(Italy) Valentino Rossi	(Belgium) Team WRT							13	14	11	1	21							16.5
33	(United Kingdom) Sandy Mitchell	(Italy) VSR	14					9	3	46	Ret					15			21	15.5
33	(United Kingdom) Sandy Mitchell	(United Kingdom) Barwell Motorsport		10	7	7	29					16	16	16	11		Ret	18		15.5
34	(Andorra) Jules Gounon (Germany) Fabian Schiller	(Germany) Mercedes-AMG Team GetSpeed	13					48†^{P}	1	60†	Ret^{2}					22			14	15
35	(Austria) Philipp Eng (Germany) Max Hesse	(Germany) ROWE Racing							9	1	29									13
=	(United Kingdom) Dan Harper	(United Kingdom) Paradine Competition	27									20	37			Ret				13
=	(United Kingdom) Dan Harper	(Germany) ROWE Racing							9	1	29									13
36	(France) Simon Gachet	(France) CSA Racing	6	16	28	20	17	Ret	14	13	13	14	12	10	38	16	7	26	31	12.5
37	(Ukraine) Ivan Klymenko (Belgium) Lorens Lecertua	(France) Saintéloc Racing	22	17	13	14	2	Ret	27	33	18	11	39	21	18	49	Ret	21	20	12
38	(Belgium) Gilles Stadsbader	(Belgium) Team WRT	53	22	21	Ret	20	8	33	28	24	19	14	19	22	24	5	8	50	12
39	(Netherlands) Mex Jansen	(United Kingdom) Century Motorsport	24					7	30	20	23					19			23	12
39	(Netherlands) Mex Jansen	(United Kingdom) Paradine Competition		12	17	22	7					24	18	17	19		13	7		12
40	(France) Paul Evrard (Belgium) Gilles Magnus	(France) Saintéloc Racing	37	18	26	4	19	27	41	24	19	12	8	18	8	37	23	14		11.5
41	(France) Cesar Gazeau (France) Aurelien Panis	(Belgium) Boutsen VDS	40	13	10	13	12	26	18	18	27	Ret	10	14	12	9	Ret	4	19	10.5
42	(Italy) Leonardo Moncini	(Germany) Tresor Attempto Racing	21	14	12	17	15	16	58	44	47†	25	25	15	15	Ret	15	22	5	10
=	(Denmark) Sebastian Øgaard	(Germany) Tresor Attempto Racing	21	14	12	17	15	16	58	44	47†	25	25	15	15	Ret	15	22	5	10
43	(Netherlands) Larry ten Voorde	(France) Schumacher CLRT						6											9	10
44	(Argentina) Ezequiel Pérez Companc	(Germany) Tresor Attempto Racing	23	23	11	10	6	13	16	61†	Ret	6	30	Ret	21					9.5
45	(United Kingdom) James Kell	(France) CSA Racing	6	20	27			Ret	14	13	13					16			31	9
=	(France) Arthur Rougier	(France) CSA Racing	6	20	27	24	24	Ret	14	13	13	37	28	Ret	WD	16			31	9
46	(France) Franck Perera	(Italy) VSR	14					9	3	46	Ret					15			21	9
47	(Belgium) Matisse Lismont	(United Kingdom) Steller Motorsport	19	26	23	Ret	23	32	19	52†	40									8
47	(Belgium) Matisse Lismont	(Belgium) Team WRT														24	5	8	50	8
48	(Netherlands) Morris Schuring	(Germany) Rutronik Racing	39						66	57	45					35				8
48	(Netherlands) Morris Schuring	(France) Schumacher CLRT						6											12	8
=	(France) Thomas Drouet (India) Arjun Maini (United Kingdom) Jann Mardenborough	(Germany) HRT Ford Performance	11					Ret	40	11	Ret					6			51	8
49	(United Kingdom) Harry King	(Netherlands) Verstappen.com Racing	9					15	11	10	9					17			8	8
50	(United Kingdom) Jamie Day (Belgium) Kobe Pauwels	(Belgium) Comtoyou Racing	36	27	14	15	8	Ret	62	54	Ret	17	9	7	9	26	11	17	49	7
51	(Italy) Marco Mapelli	(Italy) VSR	14						3	46	Ret					15				7
52	(United Kingdom) Hugo Cook	(United Kingdom) Barwell Motorsport		10	7	7	29					16	16	16	11		Ret	18		6.5
52	(United Kingdom) Hugo Cook	(Belgium) Boutsen VDS							18	18	27									6.5
53	(Netherlands) Maxime Oosten	(United Kingdom) Paradine Competition		12	17	22	7		34	27	Ret	24	18	17	19		13	7		6
54	(United Kingdom) Will Moore (South Africa) Jarrod Waberski	(United Kingdom) Century Motorsport	24					7	30	20	23					19			23	6
55	(United States) Dustin Blattner (Germany) Dennis Marschall	(Switzerland) Kessel Racing	26			23	22	29	10	16	15	15	38	30	24	Ret	6^{P}	25	18	5.5
56	(France) Loris Cabirou	(Belgium) Boutsen VDS	40					26	18	18	27					9			19	5
56	(France) Loris Cabirou	(France) CSA Racing															7	26		5
57	(Norway) Christian Krognes (United Kingdom) David Pittard	(Germany) Walkenhorst Motorsport	8					12	WD	WD	WD					14			10	5
=	(Portugal) Henrique Chaves	(Germany) Walkenhorst Motorsport	8	25	18	Ret	27	12	WD	WD	WD	13	13	23	16	14	29	27	10	5
58	(France) Etienne Cheli	(Belgium) Team WRT	53					8	33	28	24					24			50	4
=	(South Africa) Sheldon van der Linde (Belgium) Dries Vanthoor (Germany) Marco Wittmann	(Belgium) Team WRT							25	17	8									4
=	(Sweden) Gustav Bergstrom	(Belgium) Team WRT	53	22	21	Ret	20	8	33	28	24	19	14	19	22					4
59	(Italy) Mattia Michelotto	(Italy) VSR						9	70†	70†	Ret								42	2
60	(Kuwait) Bashar Mardini	(Germany) Lionspeed GP				18^{P}	32							26	32		10	23		1.5
=	(Denmark) Bastian Buus	(Germany) Lionspeed GP				18^{P}	32					28	29	26	32		10	23		1.5
=	(Denmark) Bastian Buus	(Italy) Dinamic GT							69†	69†	Ret									1.5
61	(Netherlands) Loek Hartog	(Germany) Rutronik Racing	39	15	Ret	16	28	10	66	57	45	23	41	20	20	35	26	11	12	1
=	(Hong Kong) Antares Au	(Germany) Rutronik Racing	39					10	66	57	45					35			12	1
62	(Germany) Maximilian Gotz (Canada) Mikael Grenier	(Belgium) Boutsen VDS	28					Ret	39	65†	Ret^{3}					13			Ret	1
63	(France) Jim Pla	(France) CSA Racing		16	28	20	17		14	13	13	14	12	10	38					0.5
Not classified
–	(France) Alessandro Ghiretti	(France) Schumacher CLRT																	9	0
–	(Denmark) Conrad Laursen	(Switzerland) Kessel Racing	26					29	10	16	15					Ret			18	0
–	(Canada) Zacharie Robichon	(Switzerland) Kessel Racing							10	16	15									0
–	(Belgium) Jef Machiels	(Italy) AF Corse - Francorchamps Motors	45	11	22	33	16	20	53	37	33	21	17	11	28	45	22	20	40	0
–	(Argentina) Marcos Siebert	(Italy) AF Corse - Francorchamps Motors		11	22	33	16		53	37	33	21	17	11	28		22	20		0
–	(Austria) Richard Lietz (United Kingdom) Alex Malykhin (Austria) Thomas Preining	(Lithuania) Pure Rxcing	30					11	63	64†	Ret					11			11	0
–	(Denmark) Kevin Magnussen (Germany) René Rast	(Belgium) Team WRT							13	14	11									0
–	(Sri Lanka) Eshan Pieris	(Germany) Rutronik Racing		15	Ret	16	28					23	41	20	20		26	11		0
–	(Sri Lanka) Eshan Pieris	(Italy) Dinamic GT							21	43	30									0
–	(Switzerland) Ricardo Feller (Luxembourg) Gabriel Rindone	(Germany) Lionspeed GP	38			32	34	40	42	12	21	32	Ret	34	34	33	19	28	26	0
–	(Germany) Patrick Kolb	(Germany) Lionspeed GP	38					40	42	12	21					33			26	0
–	(Italy) Riccardo Pera	(Germany) Lionspeed GP							42	12	21									0
–	(United Kingdom) Shaun Balfe (United Kingdom) Jack Hawksworth	(United Kingdom) Garage 59							49	12	22									0
–	(Denmark) Frederik Schandorff	(United Kingdom) Garage 59							28	15	12									0
–	Alexey Nesov	(Germany) Tresor Attempto Racing	50					Ret	51	63†	Ret					40	Ret	12	15	0
–	(Italy) Alberto Di Folco	(Germany) Tresor Attempto Racing	23					13	16	61†	Ret					Ret				0
–	(Ecuador) Mateo Villagomez	(Germany) Walkenhorst Motorsport	42	25	18	Ret	27	42	35	29	14	13	13	23	16	47	29	27	Ret	0
–	(Italy) Gabriele Piana	(United States) Winward Racing	33			Ret	30	14	38	26	17	27	31			41			Ret	0
–	Rinat Salikhov	(United States) Winward Racing	33			Ret	30	14	38	26	17	27	31	27	23	41	16	34	Ret	0
–	(Germany) Marvin Dienst	(United States) Winward Racing	33					14	38	26	17			27	23	41	16	34	Ret	0
–	(France) Romain Leroux (Sweden) Oliver Söderström	(Germany) Walkenhorst Motorsport	42					42	35	29	14					47			Ret	0
–	(United States) Adam Adelson (Australia) Tom Sargent (United States) Elliott Skeer	(United States) Wright Motorsports							15	19	16					28				0
–	Andrey Mukovoz	(Germany) Tresor Attempto Racing	50			25	40	Ret	51	63†	Ret	29	40	29	30	40	Ret	29	15	0
–	(Austria) Max Hofer	(Germany) Tresor Attempto Racing	50					Ret	51	63†	Ret					40			15	0
–	(Italy) Riccardo Cazzaniga	(Germany) Tresor Attempto Racing	21					16	58	44	47†					Ret			Ret	0
–	(United States) Philippe Denes	(Germany) Tresor Attempto Racing							16	61†	Ret									0
–	(Republic of Ireland) Reece Barr (United Kingdom) Alex Buncombe (United Kingdom) Tommy Foster	(United Kingdom) Team RJN	17					41	31	55	Ret					25			25	0
–	(Portugal) Guilherme Oliveira	(United Kingdom) Garage 59	54					17	49	22	22					18			36	0
–	(Portugal) Miguel Ramos	(United Kingdom) Garage 59	54					17												0
–	(United States) Neil Verhagen	(Oman) AlManar Racing by WRT							17	21	20									0
–	(Netherlands) "Daan Arrow"	(United States) Winward Racing							38	26	17									0
–	Dmitry Gvazava	(Italy) Imperiale Racing				26	35					26	26	28	27		17	30		0
–	(Italy) Loris Spinelli	(Italy) Imperiale Racing				26	35					26	26	28	27		17	30	21	0
–	(Germany) Tom Kalender	(Germany) GetSpeed							64†	66†	Ret								17	0
–	(Thailand) Tanart Sathienthirakul (United Kingdom) Aaron Walker	(Germany) GetSpeed	29					47†	68†	68†	Ret					30			17	0
–	(United Kingdom) Charles Clark (Brazil) Pedro Ebrahim (United Kingdom) James Kellett	(United Kingdom) Paradine Competition	18					22	34	27	Ret					21			35	0
–	(United States) Anthony Bartone (Poland) Karol Basz (Switzerland) Yannick Mettler	(Germany) GetSpeed	43					18	64†	66†	Ret					27			27	0
–	(United States) Wyatt Brichacek (Belgium) Lorenzo Donniacuo	(France) Saintéloc Racing							27	33	18									0
–	(United Kingdom) James Baldwin	(United Kingdom) Garage 59														18			36	0
–	(Bulgaria) Georgi Donchev (Germany) Christian Engelhart	(Austria) GRT - Grasser Racing Team				27	36					Ret	Ret				18	33		0
–	(United Kingdom) Lorcan Hanafin	(United Kingdom) Steller Motorsport	19					32	19	52	40					Ret			45	0
–	(United Kingdom) Kiern Jewiss	(United Kingdom) Steller Motorsport	19																	0
–	(United Kingdom) Kiern Jewiss	(Bahrain) 2 Seas Motorsport							56	40	26								44	0
–	(United Kingdom) Darren Leung	(United Kingdom) Paradine Competition	27			19	31	25	46	56	Ret	20	37	31	37	Ret	Ret	36	22	0
–	(France) Romain Andriolo	(Germany) HRT Ford Performance	34	28	25	Ret	21	19	29	30	35†	22	22	Ret	WD	20			43	0
–	(Germany) David Schumacher (Germany) Finn Wiebelhaus	(Germany) HRT Ford Performance	34					19	29	30	35					20			43	0
–	(Canada) Daniel Ali	(United Kingdom) Barwell Motorsport		30	24															0
–	(Canada) Daniel Ali	(United Kingdom) Steller Motorsport						32	19	52†	40					Ret			45	0
–	(Netherlands) Olivier Hart	(United Kingdom) Steller Motorsport							19	52†	40									0
–	(Switzerland) Benjamin Ricci	(France) Saintéloc Racing	37					27	25	24	19					37				0
–	(United States) Reece Gold	(France) Saintéloc Racing							41	24	19					49			20	0
–	(Switzerland) Rolf Ineichen (Germany) Joel Sturm	(Germany) Herberth Motorsport	20					Ret	50	31	51†					23				0
–	(Germany) Tim Heinemann	(Germany) Herberth Motorsport	20					Ret	50	31	51†					23			Ret	0
–	(Belgium) Louis Machiels	(Italy) AF Corse - Francorchamps Motors	45					20	53	37	33					45			40	0
–	(Italy) Andrea Bertolini	(Italy) AF Corse - Francorchamps Motors	45					20												0
–	(Japan) Tatsuya Kataoka (Japan) Kamui Kobayashi (Japan) Nobuteru Taniguchi	(Japan) Goodsmile Racing							20	50	48†									0
–	(Germany) Jusuf Owega	(Germany) HRT Ford Performance		28	25	Ret	21					22	22	Ret	WD					0
–	Ivan Ekelchik (Belgium) Baptiste Moulin	(Austria) GRT - Grasser Racing Team	32	29	Ret	21	26	44†	52	36	Ret	30	32	25	33	50	21	Ret		0
–	(United Arab Emirates) Federico Al Rifai (Netherlands) Jop Rappange	(Italy) Dinamic GT	55					45†	21	43	30					32			29	0
–	(France) Sébastien Baud	(Italy) Dinamic GT							21	43	30									0
–	(Switzerland) Lucas Legeret	(France) Saintéloc Racing	22																	0
–	(Indonesia) Sean Gelael	(United Kingdom) Paradine Competition	27					25	46	56	Ret					Ret			22	0
–	(United Kingdom) Jake Dennis	(United Kingdom) Paradine Competition							46	56	Ret			31	37		Ret	36	22	0
–	(Finland) Jesse Salmenautio	(United Kingdom) Steller Motorsport		26	23	Ret	23													0
–	(Qatar) Ghanim Salah Al-Maadheed	(Qatar) QMMF by Saintéloc Racing	47			31	39	23	65	58	46	34	36	35	35	44			28	0
–	(Qatar) Ibrahim Al-Abdulghani	(Qatar) QMMF by Saintéloc Racing	47			31	39	23	65	58	46	34	36	35	35	44				0
–	(Qatar) Abdulla Ali Al-Khelaifi	(Qatar) QMMF by Saintéloc Racing	47					23	64	58	46					44	28	31	28	0
–	(Germany) Ralf Bohn (Germany) Alfred Renauer	(Germany) Herberth Motorsport	35					28	32	23	25					38			Ret	0
–	(Germany) Robert Renauer	(Germany) Herberth Motorsport	35					28	32	23	25					38				0
–	(Zimbabwe) Axcil Jefferies	(Germany) Herberth Motorsport							32	23	25									0
–	(Austria) Simon Birch	(Austria) Razoon - more than racing										33	23							0
–	(United States) Christian Bogle	(United Kingdom) Barwell Motorsport	44	30	24	28	38	36												0
–	(Spain) Isaac Tutumlu Lopez	(France) CSA Racing				24	24					37	28	Ret	WD					0
–	(Spain) Isaac Tutumlu Lopez	(Austria) GRT - Grasser Racing Team																	47	0
–	(Denmark) Largim Ali (Australia) James Allen (United Kingdom) Mikey Porter	(United Kingdom) Optimum Motorsport	52					24	43	39	39					29			41	0
–	(France) Pierre-Louis Chovet	(Belgium) Team WRT							33	28	24									0
–	(United States) Bijoy Garg	(United Kingdom) Barwell Motorsport	44			28	38	36	48	38	34	Ret	27	24	25					0
–	(United Kingdom) Ricky Collard	(United Kingdom) Barwell Motorsport							48	38	34	Ret	27	24	25					0
–	(United Arab Emirates) Mathieu Detry (United Arab Emirates) Fabian Duffieux	(Italy) UNX Racing										36	35	36	29	34	24	32	46	0
–	(Italy) Eddie Cheever III	(United Kingdom) Ziggo Sport – Tempesta Racing	48			30	33	37	37	25	50†	31	34	32	32	Ret	27	24	39	0
–	(Italy) Marco Pulcini	(United Kingdom) Ziggo Sport – Tempesta Racing	48			30	33					31	34	32	32	Ret	27	24	39	0
–	(United Kingdom) Zac Meakin (United Kingdom) Michael O'Brien (United Kingdom) Jayden Kelly	(United Kingdom) Greystone GT																	24	0
–	(Italy) Michele Beretta (Italy) Alessio Deledda	(Italy) VSR	25					35	70†	70†	Ret					51			42	0
–	(United Kingdom) Finlay Hutchison	(Italy) VSR	25																	0
–	(Luxembourg) Dylan Pereira	(Germany) Tresor Attempto Racing				25	40		51	63†	Ret	29	40	29	30		Ret	29		0
–	(United Kingdom) Ashley Sutton	(United Kingdom) Paradine Competition						25												0
–	(United Kingdom) Chris Froggatt	(United Kingdom) Ziggo Sport – Tempesta Racing	48					37	37	25	50†								39	0
–	(Hong Kong) Jonathan Hui	(United Kingdom) Ziggo Sport – Tempesta Racing						37	37	25	50									0
–	(Italy) Lorenzo Patrese	(United Kingdom) Ziggo Sport – Tempesta Racing							37	25	50†					Ret				0
–	(Brazil) Rafael Suzuki	(Belgium) Comtoyou Racing				29	37							33	36		25	37		0
–	(Brazil) Ricardo Baptista	(Belgium) Comtoyou Racing				29	37					35	33	33	36		25	37		0
–	(Netherlands) Indy Dontje (Switzerland) Philip Ellis (United States) Russell Ward	(United States) Winward Racing							26	59†	Ret									0
–	(Canada) Parker Thompson (United Kingdom) Lewis Williamson	(Bahrain) 2 Seas Motorsport							56	40	26									0
–	(United Kingdom) Charles Dawson	(Bahrain) 2 Seas Motorsport							56	40	26					31			44	0
–	(Belgium) Nicolas Baert	(Belgium) Comtoyou Racing	36					Ret	62	54	Ret					26			49	0
–	(Italy) David Fumanelli (Switzerland) Nicolo Rosi (Italy) Niccolo Schiro	(Switzerland) Kessel Racing	31					34	60	48	28					36			Ret	0
–	(Italy) Daniele Di Amato	(Switzerland) Kessel Racing							60	48	28									0
–	(Germany) Julian Hanses	(Qatar) QMMF by Saintéloc Racing							65	58	46						28	31	28	0
–	(Netherlands) Colin Caresani	(Germany) GetSpeed	29					47†	68†	68†	Ret									0
–	(Germany) Salman Owega	(Germany) HRT Ford Performance							29	30	35									0
–	(Denmark) Mikkel Pedersen	(Italy) Dinamic GT						45†								32			29	0
–	(Italy) Felice Jelmini (Italy) Federico Malvestiti (Brazil) Marcelo Tomasoni	(Italy) BMW Italia Ceccato racing	Ret					30	57	42	49†					39			32	0
–	(Netherlands) Lin Hodenius	(Germany) GetSpeed							68†	68†	Ret					30				0
–	(Japan) Yuichi Nakayama	(Germany) Ring Racing	51						47	35	37					52			30	0
–	(United Kingdom) Adam Christodoulou	(Germany) Ring Racing														52			30	0
–	(Italy) Edoardo Liberati	(Germany) Ring Racing	51					33	47	35	37					52			30	0
–	(Italy) Marzio Moretti (Germany) Maximilian Paul (United States) John Paul Southern Jr	(Germany) Paul Motorsport	49					31	45	32	42					43			37	0
–	(Germany) Ben Dörr	(United Kingdom) Team RJN							31	55	Ret									0
–	(United Kingdom) Thomas Lebbon	(Bahrain) 2 Seas Motorsport														31			44	0
–	(United Kingdom) Ben Barnicoat	(Bahrain) 2 Seas Motorsport														31				0
–	(Netherlands) Dante Rappange	(Austria) GRT - Grasser Racing Team	32					44	52	36	Ret					50			47	0
–	(Poland) Robin Rogalski	(Germany) Paul Motorsport							45	32	42									0
–	(Japan) Kazuto Kotaka	(Germany) Ring Racing	51					33	47	35	37									0
–	(Germany) Tim Sandtler	(Germany) Ring Racing						33	47	35	37									0
–	(Italy) Tommaso Mosca	(Italy) AF Corse - Francorchamps Motors							53	37	33					45			40	0
–	(Brazil) Sergio Sette Camara	(Belgium) Comtoyou Racing										35	33							0
–	(China) Yifei Ye	(Italy) AF Corse - Francorchamps Motors																	33	0
–	(Canada) Adam Ali	(United Kingdom) Barwell Motorsport	44					36	48	38	34								45	0
–	(United Kingdom) Rob Collard	(United Kingdom) Barwell Motorsport							48	38	34									0
–	(Italy) Andrea Frassineti	(Italy) VSR						35	70†	70†	Ret									0
–	(United Kingdom) Jessica Hawkins	(Belgium) Comtoyou Racing	46					WD	71†	71†	Ret					48	Ret	35	48	0
–	(Mozambique) Rodrigo Almeida	(Belgium) Comtoyou Racing							71†	71†	Ret						Ret	35		0
–	(China) Jiatong Liang	(Austria) GRT - Grasser Racing Team							52	36	Ret									0
–	(Germany) Christian Hook (Italy) Davide Rigon	(Germany) Rinaldi Racing	41					38	44	49	41									0
–	(South Africa) David Perel	(Germany) Rinaldi Racing	41					38	44	49	41					DNS			38	0
–	(Italy) Fabrizio Crestani (Italy) Rafael Duran	(Germany) Rinaldi Racing														DNS			38	0
–	(France) Edgar Maloigne (France) Maxime Robin (India) Sai Sanjay	(France) CSA Racing	Ret					39	74†	74†	Ret					42			Ret	0
–	(United Kingdom) Ollie Millroy	(United Kingdom) Optimum Motorsport							43	39	39									0
–	(Germany) Felipe Fernandez Laser	(Germany) Rinaldi Racing							44	49	41									0
–	(United States) Connor De Phillippi	(Italy) BMW Italia Ceccato Racing							57	42	49†									0
–	(Malaysia) Prince Abu Bakar Ibrahim (Malaysia) H. H. Prince Jefri Ibrahim (Australia) Jordan Love (United Kingdom) Alexander Sims	(Malaysia) Johor Motorsports JMR							61	51	43									0
–	(Italy) Rocco Mazzola	(Germany) Tresor Attempto Racing							58	44	47†								Ret	0
–	(Estonia) Martin Rump	(Germany) Rutronik Racing							66	57	45									0
–	(Belgium) Alexandre Leroy (Belgium) Antoine Potty	(Belgium) Comtoyou Racing	46					WD	71†	71†	Ret					48			48	0
–	(United Kingdom) Toby Sowery	(United Kingdom) Paradine Competition							46	56	Ret									0
–	(Austria) Gerhard Tweraser	(Austria) GRT - Grasser Racing Team																	47	0
–	(Israel) Artem Petrov	(Italy) VSR														51				0
–	(Netherlands) Xavier Maassen	(Belgium) Comtoyou Racing							62	54	Ret									0
–	(Guatemala) Mateo Llarena	(Italy) Dinamic GT	55																	0
–	(Australia) Matt Campbell (France) Mathieu Jaminet	(Italy) Dinamic GT							69†	69†	Ret									0
–	(United Kingdom) Joshua Mason	(France) CSA Racing							74†	74†	Ret									0
–	(United States) Alec Udell	(United Kingdom) Steller Motorsport														Ret				0
–	(Netherlands) Job van Uiteret	(Germany) Tresor Attempto Racing														Ret			Ret	0
Pos.	Drivers	Team	LEC (France)	S1	S2	S1	S2	MNZ (Italy)	6hrs	12hrs	24hrs	S1	S2	S1	S2	NÜR (Germany)	S1	S2	BAR (Spain)	Points
Pos.	Drivers	Team	LEC (France)	BRH (United Kingdom)		ZAN (Netherlands)		MNZ (Italy)	SPA (Belgium)			MIS (Italy)		MAG (France)		NÜR (Germany)	VAL (Spain)		BAR (Spain)	Points

Key
Colour	Result
Gold	Race winner
Silver	2nd place
Bronze	3rd place
Green	Points finish
Blue	Non-points finish
Blue	Non-classified finish (NC)
Purple	Did not finish (Ret)
Black	Disqualified (DSQ)
Black	Excluded (EX)
White	Did not start (DNS)
White	Race cancelled (C)
White	Withdrew (WD)
Blank	Did not participate

^{P} – Pole
^{2, 3} – Top 3 Superpole positions at the 24 Hours of Spa

==== Gold Drivers' standings ====
Pos.	Drivers	Team	LEC (France)	BRH (United Kingdom)		ZAN (Netherlands)		MNZ (Italy)	SPA (Belgium)			MIS (Italy)		MAG (France)		NÜR (Germany)	VAL (Spain)		BAR (Spain)	Points
Pos.	Drivers	Team	LEC (France)	S1	S2	S1	S2	MNZ (Italy)	6hrs	12hrs	24hrs	S1	S2	S1	S2	NÜR (Germany)	S1	S2	BAR (Spain)	Points
1	(United Kingdom) Chris Lulham (Netherlands) Thierry Vermeulen	(Netherlands) Verstappen.com Racing	2					2	1	1	1					3			3	239.5
1	(United Kingdom) Chris Lulham (Netherlands) Thierry Vermeulen	(Switzerland) Emil Frey Racing		1^{P}	2^{P}	2	1^{P}					Ret^{P}	1	5^{P}	6^{P}		2	1		239.5
2	(Oman) Al Faisal Al Zubair (Germany) Jens Klingmann	(Oman) AlManar Racing by WRT	3	5	1	3	3	1	4	5	5	Ret	4	2	4	1	4	2	2	196
3	(Monaco) Louis Prette	(United Kingdom) Garage 59	Ret^{P}	2	4	Ret	5	Ret^{P}	6	3	2	1	3	1	2	Ret^{P}	1^{P}	4^{P}	1^{P}	164
4	(United Kingdom) Harry King	(Netherlands) Verstappen.com Racing	2					2	1	1	1					3			3	121
5	(Italy) Leonardo Moncini	(Germany) Tresor Attempto Racing	6	3	3	4	2	3	12	10	9†	3	5	3	3		5	5		111
=	(Denmark) Sebastian Øgaard	(Germany) Tresor Attempto Racing	6	3	3	4	2	3	12	10	9†	3	5	3	3	Ret	5	5		111
6	(United Kingdom) Ben Tuck	(Oman) AlManar Racing by WRT	3					1	4	5	5					1			2	108
7	(France) Simon Gachet	(France) CSA Racing	1					Ret	2	2	3					2	3	6	5	108
8	(United Kingdom) James Kell (France) Arthur Rougier	(France) CSA Racing	1	6	6			Ret	2	2	3					2			5	103
9	(France) Paul Evrard (Belgium) Gilles Magnus	(France) Saintéloc Racing		4	5	1^{P}	4					2	2^{P}	4	1		6	3		101.5
10	(United Kingdom) Adam Smalley	(United Kingdom) Garage 59	Ret^{P}	2	4	Ret	5	Ret^{P}	6	3	2					Ret^{P}			1^{P}	83.5
11	(United Kingdom) Tom Fleming	(United Kingdom) Garage 59										1	3	1	2		1^{P}	4^{P}		80.5
12	(United Kingdom) Dean MacDonald	(United Kingdom) Garage 59	Ret^{P}					Ret^{P}	6	3	2					Ret^{P}			1^{P}	58
13	(Republic of Ireland) Reece Barr (United Kingdom) Alex Buncombe (United Kingdom) Tommy Foster	(United Kingdom) Team RJN	4					7	7	11	Ret					5			4	46
14	(Denmark) Largim Ali (Australia) James Allen (United Kingdom) Mikey Porter	(United Kingdom) Optimum Motorsport	8					4	8	9	7					7			7	37
15	(Italy) Marzio Moretti (Germany) Maximilian Paul (United States) John Paul Southern Jr	(Germany) Paul Motorsport	7					5	9	7	8					8			6	36
16	(France) Jim Pla	(France) CSA Racing							2	2	3									33
17	(United States) Adam Adelson (Australia) Thomas Sargent (United States) Elliott Skeer	(United States) Wright Motorsports							3	4	4					6				33
18	(Germany) Tim Heinemann (Switzerland) Rolf Ineichen (Germany) Joel Sturm	(Germany) Herberth Motorsport	5					Ret	11	6	10†^{P}					4				30
19	(Denmark) Frederik Schandorff	(United Kingdom) Garage 59							6	3	2									29
20	(Italy) Riccardo Cazzaniga	(Germany) Tresor Attempto Racing	6					3	12	10	9†					Ret			Ret	26
21	(United States) Neil Verhagen	(Oman) AlManar Racing by WRT							4	5	5									21
22	(Japan) Kazuto Kotaka (Italy) Edoardo Liberati (Germany) Tim Sandtler	(Germany) Nordique Racing						6	10	8	6									18
23	(United Kingdom) Ricky Collard (United States) Bijoy Garg	(United Kingdom) Barwell Motorsport										Ret	6	6	5					15
24	(France) Loris Cabirou	(France) CSA Racing															3	6		14
25	(Japan) Yuichi Nakayama	(Germany) Nordique Racing							10	8	6									10
26	(United Kingdom) Ollie Millroy	(United Kingdom) Optimum Motorsport							8	9	7									9
27	(Poland) Robin Rogalski	(Germany) Paul Motorsport							9	7	8									8
28	(Netherlands) Indy Dontje (Switzerland) Philip Ellis (United States) Russell Ward	(United States) Winward Racing							5	12†	Ret									5
29	(Germany) Ben Dörr	(United Kingdom) Team RJN							7	11	Ret									3
30	(Italy) Rocco Mazzola	(Germany) Tresor Attempto Racing							12	10	9†								Ret	2
Not classified
–	(Netherlands) Job van Uitert	(Germany) Tresor Attempto Racing														Ret			Ret	0
Pos.	Drivers	Team	LEC (France)	S1	S2	S1	S2	MNZ (Italy)	6hrs	12hrs	24hrs	S1	S2	S1	S2	NÜR (Germany)	S1	S2	BAR (Spain)	Points
Pos.	Drivers	Team	LEC (France)	BRH (United Kingdom)		ZAN (Netherlands)		MNZ (Italy)	SPA (Belgium)			MIS (Italy)		MAG (France)		NÜR (Germany)	VAL (Spain)		BAR (Spain)	Points

==== Silver Drivers' standings ====
Pos.	Drivers	Team	LEC (France)	BRH (United Kingdom)		ZAN (Netherlands)		MNZ (Italy)	SPA (Belgium)			MIS (Italy)		MAG (France)		NÜR (Germany)	VAL (Spain)		BAR (Spain)	Points
Pos.	Drivers	Team	LEC (France)	S1	S2	S1	S2	MNZ (Italy)	6hrs	12hrs	24hrs	S1	S2	S1	S2	NÜR (Germany)	S1	S2	BAR (Spain)	Points
1	(France) Cesar Gazeau (France) Aurelien Panis	(Belgium) Boutsen VDS	11	3	1^{P}	2	5	7	2	1	5	Ret	2	3	2	1	Ret	1^{P}	3	173
2	(Netherlands) Mex Jansen	(United Kingdom) Century Motorsport	5					1	7	2	3^{P}					3			5	166
2	(Netherlands) Mex Jansen	(United Kingdom) Paradine Competition		2	5	7	3					7	5	4	4		3	2		166
3	(Germany) Alex Aka	(Germany) Tresor Attempto Racing	4	7	2	1^{P}	2	3	1	12†	Ret	1^{P}	6	Ret	6	Ret	Ret	5	1	144
4	(Ukraine) Ivan Klymenko (Belgium) Lorens Lecertua	(France) Saintéloc Racing	3	5^{P}	3	3	1^{P}	Ret	5	7	2	2	8	7	3	13	Ret	8	4	129
5	(Argentina) Ezequiel Pérez Companc	(Germany) Tresor Attempto Racing	4	7	2	1^{P}	2	3	1	12†	Ret	1^{P}	6	Ret	6					113
6	(United Arab Emirates) Jamie Day (Belgium) Kobe Pauwels	(Belgium) Comtoyou Racing	10	9	4	4	4	Ret^{P}	12	10	Ret	3	1^{P}	1	1^{P}	7	2^{P}	6	16	110
7	(Belgium) Gilles Stadsbader	(Belgium) Team WRT	15	6	6	Ret	7	2	8	4	4	4	3	5	7	6	1	3	17	110
8	(United Kingdom) Will Moore (South Africa) Jarrod Waberski	(United Kingdom) Century Motorsport	5					1	7	2	3^{P}					3			5	90
9	(Netherlands) Maxime Oosten	(United Kingdom) Paradine Competition		2	5	7	3		9	3	Ret	7	5	4	4		3	2		84
10	(Belgium) Matisse Lismont	(United Kingdom) Steller Motorsport	2	8	8	Ret	8	8	3	10†	8									79
10	(Belgium) Matisse Lismont	(Belgium) Team WRT														6	1	3	17	79
11	(France) Loris Cabirou	(Belgium) Boutsen VDS	11					7	2	1	5					1			3	77
12	(Sweden) Gustav Bergström	(Belgium) Team WRT	15	6	6	Ret	7	2	8	4	4	4	3	5	WD					73
13	(Belgium) Jef Machiels (Argentina) Marcos Siebert	(Italy) AF Corse - Francorchamps Motors		1	7	9	6					5	4	2^{P}	8		5	7		62.5
14	(United Kingdom) Charles Clark (Brazil) Pedro Ebrahim (United Kingdom) James Kellett	(United Kingdom) Paradine Competition	1					6	9	3	Ret					5			9	61
15	(France) Etienne Cheli	(Belgium) Team WRT	15					2	8	4	4					6			17	46
16	(Italy) Alberto Di Folco	(Germany) Tresor Attempto Racing	4					3	1	12†	Ret					Ret				42
17	(Netherlands) Loek Hartog	(Germany) Rutronik Racing		4	Ret	5	10					6	9	6	5		6	4		42
18	(United Kingdom) Lorcan Hanafin	(United Kingdom) Steller Motorsport	2					8	3	10†	8					Ret			14	39
19	(France) Romain Andriolo (Germany) David Schumacher (Germany) Finn Wiebelhaus	(Germany) HRT Ford Performance	9					5	6	6	7†					4			13	38
20	(United Kingdom) Hugo Cook	(Belgium) Boutsen VDS							2	1	5									31
21	(France) Romain Leroux (Sweden) Oliver Söderström (Ecuador) Mateo Villagomez	(Germany) Walkenhorst Motorsport	12					12	10	5	1					12			Ret	30
22	Ivan Ekelchik (Belgium) Baptiste Moulin	(Austria) GRT - Grasser Racing Team	8	5	Ret	6	9	13	11	8	Ret	8	7	8	9	14	4	10		27.5
23	(Thailand) Tanart Sathienthirakul (United Kingdom) Aaron Walker	(Germany) GetSpeed	7					15	14†	14†	Ret					9			2	26
24	(United States) Wyatt Brichacek (Belgium) Lorenzo Donniacuo	(France) Saintéloc Racing							5	7	2									26
25	(United Kingdom) Kiern Jewiss	(United Kingdom) Steller Motorsport	2																	24
26	(United States) Anthony Bartone (Poland) Karol Basz (Switzerland) Yannick Mettler	(Germany) GetSpeed	13					4	13†	13†	Ret					8			7	22
27	(United Kingdom) James Baldwin (United Kingdom) Tom Fleming (Portugal) Guilherme Oliveira	(United Kingdom) Garage 59														2^{P}			10^{P}	21
28	(France) Pierre-Louis Chovet	(Belgium) Team WRT							8	4	4									20
29	(United Arab Emirates) Federico Al Rifai (Netherlands) Jop Rappange	(Italy) Dinamic GT	16					14	4	9	6					10			8	20
30	(Switzerland) Lucas Legeret	(France) Saintéloc Racing	3																	19
31	(Germany) Tom Kalender	(Germany) GetSpeed							13†	13†	Ret								2	18
32	(Canada) Daniel Ali	(United Kingdom) Barwell Motorsport		11	9															16
32	(Canada) Daniel Ali	(United Kingdom) Steller Motorsport						8	3	10†	8					Ret			14	16
33	(France) Sébastien Baud	(Italy) Dinamic GT							4	9	6									15
=	(Sri Lanka) Eshan Pieris	(Germany) Rutronik Racing		4‡	Ret	5‡	10‡					6‡	9‡	6‡	5‡		6‡	4‡		15
=	(Sri Lanka) Eshan Pieris	(Italy) Dinamic GT							4	9	6									15
34	(Germany) Salman Owega	(Germany) HRT Ford Performance							6	6	7†									14
35	(United States) Reece Gold	(France) Saintéloc Racing														13			4	12
36	(Italy) Michele Beretta (Italy) Alessio Deledda	(Italy) VSR	6^{P}					9	15†	15†	Ret					15			12	12
37	(United States) Philippe Denes	(Germany) Tresor Attempto Racing							1	12†	Ret									12
38	(Netherlands) Olivier Hart	(United Kingdom) Steller Motorsport							3	10†	8									11
39	(United Kingdom) Finlay Hutchison	(Italy) VSR	6^{P}																	10
41	(Belgium) Nicolas Baert	(Belgium) Comtoyou Racing	10					Ret^{P}	12	10	Ret					7			16	8
42	Alexey Nesov	(Germany) Tresor Attempto Racing															Ret	5		6
43	(Netherlands) Colin Caresani	(Germany) GetSpeed	7					15	14†	14†	Ret									6
44	(Finland) Jesse Salmenautio	(United Kingdom) Steller Motorsport		8	8	Ret	8													6
45	(Netherlands) Dante Rappanage	(Austria) GRT - Grasser Racing Team	8					13	11	8	Ret					14			15	6
46	(Denmark) Mikkel O. Pedersen	(Italy) Dinamic GT						14								10			8	5
47	(United States) Christian Bogle	(United Kingdom) Barwell Motorsport	14	11	9	8	11	10												4
48	(United States) Bijoy Garg	(United Kingdom) Barwell Motorsport	14			8	11	10												3
49	(Netherlands) Lin Hodenius	(Germany) GetSpeed							14†	14†	Ret					9				2
=	(Italy) Andrea Frassineti	(Italy) VSR						9	15†	15†	Ret									2
50	(China) Jiatong Liang	(Austria) GRT - Grasser Racing Team							11	8	Ret									2
51	(Mozambique) Rodrigo Almeida (United Kingdom) Jessica Hawkins	(Belgium) Comtoyou Racing															Ret	9		1
52	(Canada) Adam Ali	(United Kingdom) Barwell Motorsport	14					10												1
Not classified
–	(Denmark) Sebastian Øgaard	(Germany) Tresor Attempto Racing																	1	0
–	(Italy) Leonardo Moncini	(Germany) Tresor Attempto Racing														Ret			1	0
–	(United Kingdom) Zac Meakin (United Kingdom) Michael O'Brien (United Kingdom) Jayden Kelly	(United Kingdom) Greystone GT																	6	0
–	(Netherlands) Xavier Maassen	(Belgium) Comtoyou Racing							12	10	Ret									0
–	(France) Edgar Maloigne (France) Maxime Robin (India) Sai Sanjay	(France) CSA Racing	Ret					11	16†	16†	Ret					11			Ret	0
–	(Italy) Fabrizio Crestani (Italy) Rafael Duran (South Africa) David Perel	(Germany) Rinaldi Racing														DNS			11	0
–	(Italy) Mattia Michelotto	(Italy) VSR							15†	15†	Ret								12	0
–	(United Kingdom) Lorcan Hanafin	(United Kingdom) Steller Motorsport														Ret			14	0
–	(Israel) Artem Petrov	(Italy) VSR														15				0
–	(Spain) Isaac Tutumlu Lopez (Austria) Gerhard Tweraser	(Austria) GRT - Grasser Racing Team																	15	0
–	(Guatemala) Mateo Llarena	(Italy) Dinamic GT	16																	0
–	(United Kingdom) Joshua Mason	(France) CSA Racing							16†	16†	Ret									0
Pos.	Drivers	Team	LEC (France)	S1	S2	S1	S2	MNZ (Italy)	6hrs	12hrs	24hrs	S1	S2	S1	S2	NÜR (Germany)	S1	S2	BAR (Spain)	Points
Pos.	Drivers	Team	LEC (France)	BRH (United Kingdom)		ZAN (Netherlands)		MNZ (Italy)	SPA (Belgium)			MIS (Italy)		MAG (France)		NÜR (Germany)	VAL (Spain)		BAR (Spain)	Points

==== Bronze Drivers' standings ====
Pos.	Drivers	Team	LEC (France)	ZAN (Netherlands)		MNZ (Italy)	SPA (Belgium)			MIS (Italy)		MAG (France)		NÜR (Germany)	VAL (Spain)		BAR (Spain)	Points
Pos.	Drivers	Team	LEC (France)	S1	S2	MNZ (Italy)	6hrs	12hrs	24hrs	S1	S2	S1	S2	NÜR (Germany)	S1	S2	BAR (Spain)	Points
1	(United States) Dustin Blattner (Germany) Dennis Marschall	(Switzerland) Kessel Racing	1	3	1^{P}	9	1	2	1	1^{P}	10^{P}	5	2^{P}	Ret^{P}	1^{P}	3	3	189
2	Rinat Salikhov	(United States) Winward Racing	4	Ret	3	2	4	7	2	4	4	2	1	10	3	10	Ret	124
3	(Germany) Marvin Dienst	(United States) Winward Racing	4			2	4	7	2			2	1	10	3	10	Ret	99.5
4	(Denmark) Conrad Laursen	(Switzerland) Kessel Racing	1			9	1	2	1								3	97
5	(Denmark) Bastian Buus	(Germany) Lionspeed GP		1^{P}	5					5	3	1	7		2	1		87
5	(Denmark) Bastian Buus	(Italy) UNX Racing															11	87
=	(Kuwait) Bashar Mardini	(Germany) Lionspeed GP		1^{P}	5					5	3	1	7		2	1		87
6	(Italy) Gabriele Piana	(United States) Winward Racing	4	Ret	3	2	4	7	2	4	4			10			Ret	85.5
7	(United Kingdom) Darren Leung	(United Kingdom) Paradine Competition	2	2	4	6	8	15	Ret	2	9	6	11	Ret	Ret	11^{P}	4	84
8	(Switzerland) Ricardo Feller (Luxembourg) Gabriel Rindone	(Germany) Lionspeed GP	7	11	7	14	6	1	4	8	Ret	9	8	2	6	4	5	82
9	(Hong Kong) Antares Au (Netherlands) Loek Hartog	(Germany) Rutronik Racing	8			1	18	16	13					4			1	66
10	Dmitry Gvazava (Italy) Loris Spinelli	(Italy) Imperiale Racing		6	8					3	1	3	3		4	6		63.5
11	(Germany) Patrick Kolb	(Germany) Lionspeed GP	7			14	6	1	4					2			5	62
12	Andrey Mukovoz	(Germany) Tresor Attempto Racing	14	5	12	Ret	11	18†	Ret^{P}	6	11	4	5	9	Ret	5	2	51
13	(Italy) Eddie Cheever III	(United Kingdom) Ziggo Sport Tempesta	13	9	6	12	3	6	16†	7	6	7	6	Ret	9	2	8	48.5
14	(France) Paul Evrard (Belgium) Gilles Magnus (Switzerland) Benjamin Ricci	(France) Saintéloc Racing	6			7	5	5	3					6			Ret	48
15	(Canada) Zacharie Robichon	(Switzerland) Kessel Racing					1	2	1									46
16	(Indonesia) Sean Gelael	(United Kingdom) Paradine Competition	2			6	8	15	Ret					Ret			4	46
17	(Germany) Ralf Bohn (Germany) Alfred Renauer	(Germany) Herberth Motorsport	5			8	2	4	6					7			Ret	45
=	(Germany) Robert Renauer	(Germany) Herberth Motorsport	5			8	2	4	6					7				45
18	(Netherlands) Morris Schuring	(Germany) Rutronik Racing	8				18	16	13					4			1	41
19	(Italy) Marco Pulcini	(United Kingdom) Ziggo Sport Tempesta	13	9	6					7	6	7	6	Ret	9	2	8	37.5
20	(United Kingdom) Dan Harper	(United Kingdom) Paradine Competition	2							2	9			Ret				37
21	(Italy) David Fumanelli (Switzerland) Nicolo Rosi (Italy) Niccolo Schiro	(Switzerland) Kessel Racing	3			11	15	12	8					5			Ret^{P}	34
22	(United Kingdom) Thomas Fleming (Portugal) Guilherme Oliveira	(United Kingdom) Garage 59	15^{P}			3^{P}	10	3	5									34
23	(United Kingdom) Charles Dawson	(Bahrain) 2 Seas Motorsport					13	10	7					1			10	32
24	(France) Arthur Rougier (Spain) Isaac Tutumlu Lopez	(France) CSA Racing		4	2					12	2	Ret	WD					31.5
25	(Luxembourg) Dylan Pereira	(Germany) Tresor Attempto Racing		5	12		11	18†	Ret^{P}	6	11	4	5		Ret	5		31
26	(United Arab Emirates) Mathieu Detry (United Arab Emirates) Fabian Duffieux	(Italy) UNX Racing								11	7	11	4	3	7	8	11	30.5
27	(Italy) Riccardo Pera	(Germany) Lionspeed GP					6	1	4									28
28	(Netherlands) "Daan Arrow"	(United States) Winward Racing					4	7	2									27
29	(United Kingdom) Thomas Lebbon	(Bahrain) 2 Seas Motorsport												1			10	26
30	(United Kingdom) Ben Barnicoat	(Bahrain) 2 Seas Motorsport												1				25
31	(United States) Reece Gold	(France) Saintéloc Racing					5	5	3									25
32	(Qatar) Ghanim Salah Al-Maadheed	(Qatar) QMMF by Saintéloc Racing	12	10	11	5	17	17	14	9	8	10	9	11			6	23
33	(Zimbabwe) Axcil Jefferies	(Germany) Herberth Motorsport					2	4	6									23
34	(Qatar) Abdulla Ali Al-Khelaifi	(Qatar) QMMF by Saintéloc Racing	12			5	17	17	14					11	10	7	6	21.5
35	(Austria) Max Hofer; Alexey Nesov	(Germany) Tresor Attempto Racing	14			15	11	18†	Ret^{P}					9			2	21
36	(Brazil) Augusto Farfus	(United Kingdom) Paradine Competition		2	4													19.5
37	(United Kingdom) Jake Dennis	(United Kingdom) Paradine Competition					8	15	Ret			6	11		Ret	11^{P}	4	19.5
38	(Belgium) Jef Machiels (Belgium) Louis Machiels	(Italy) AF Corse - Francorchamps Motors	10			4	12	8	9					12			9	19
39	(Portugal) Miguel Ramos	(United Kingdom) Garage 59	15^{P}			3^{P}												17
40	(United Kingdom) Shaun Balfe (United Kingdom) Jack Hawksworth	(United Kingdom) Garage 59					10	3	5									17
41	(Qatar) Ibrahim Al-Abdulghani	(Qatar) QMMF by Sainetloc Racing	12	10	11	5	17	17	14	9	8	10	9	11				15
42	(United Kingdom) Chris Froggatt	(United Kingdom) Ziggo Sport Tempesta	13			12	3	6	16†								8	15
43	(Brazil) Ricardo Baptista	(Belgium) Comtoyou Racing		8	10					10	5	8^{P}	10		8	12		14.5
44	(Italy) Andrea Bertolini	(Italy) AF Corse - Francorchamps Motors	10			4												13
45	(Germany) Julian Hanses	(Qatar) QMMF by Saintéloc Racing					17	17	14						10	7	6	11.5
46	(Germany) Christian Engelhart	(Austria) GRT - Grasser Racing Team		7	9					Ret	Ret				5	9		11
47	(Italy) Felice Jelmini (Italy) Federico Malvestiti (Brazil) Marcelo Tomasoni	(Italy) BMW Italia Ceccato racing	Ret			10	14	11	15†					8			7	11
48	(Italy) Lorenzo Patrese	(United Kingdom) Ziggo Sport Tempesta					3	6	16†					Ret				11
48	(Hong Kong) Jonathan Hui	(United Kingdom) Ziggo Sport Tempesta				12	3	6	16†									11
49	(United Kingdom) Ash Sutton	(United Kingdom) Paradine Competition				6												8
50	(Brazil) Rafael Suzuki	(Belgium) Comtoyou Racing		8	10							8^{P}	10		8	12		8
52	(United Kingdom) Kiern Jewiss	(Bahrain) 2 Seas Motorsport					13	10	7								10	7
53	(Brazil) Sérgio Sette Câmara	(Belgium) Comtoyou Racing								10	5							6.5
54	(Canada) Parker Thompson (United Kingdom) Lewis Williamson	(Bahrain) 2 Seas Motorsport					13	10	7									6
55	(Italy) Tommaso Mosca	(Italy) AF Corse - Francorchamps Motors					12	8	9					12			9	6
56	(Germany) Christian Hook (South Africa) David Perel (Italy) Davide Rigon	(Germany) Rinaldi Racing	9			13	7	13	11									5
57	(Bulgaria) Georgi Donczew	(Austria) GRT - Grasser Racing Team		7	9					Ret	Ret				5	9		4
58	(Italy) Daniele Di Amato	(Switzerland) Kessel Racing					15	12	8									4
59	(Argentina) Marco Siebert	(Italy) AF Corse - Francorchamps Motors					12	8	9									4
60	(Canada) Adam Ali (United Kingdom) Ricky Collard (United Kingdom) Rob Collard (United States) Bijoy Garg	(United Kingdom) Barwell Motorsport					9	9	10									3
61	(Germany) Felipe Fernandez Laser	(Germany) Rinaldi Racing					7	13	11									3
62	(United Kingdom) Toby Sowery	(United Kingdom) Paradine Competition					8	15	Ret									2
Not classified
–	(United Kingdom) Jessica Hawkins (Belgium) Alexandre Leroy (Belgium) Antoine Potty	(Belgium) Comtoyou Racing	11			WD	19†	19†	Ret					13			12	0
–	(United States) Connor De Phillippi	(Italy) BMW Italia Ceccato racing					14	11	15†									0
–	(Malaysia) Prince Abu Bakar Ibrahim (Malaysia) H. H. Prince Jefri Ibrahim (Australia) Jordan Love (United Kingdom) Alexander Sims	(Malaysia) Johor Motorsports JMR					16	14	12									0
–	(Estonia) Martin Rump	(Germany) Rutronik Racing					18	16	13									0
–	(Mozambique) Rodrigo Almeida	(Belgium) Comtoyou Racing					19†	19†	Ret									0
–	(Germany) Tim Heinemann	(Germany) Herberth Motorsport															Ret	0
Pos.	Drivers	Team	LEC (France)	S1	S2	MNZ (Italy)	6hrs	12hrs	24hrs	S1	S2	S1	S2	NÜR (Germany)	S1	S2	BAR (Spain)	Points
Pos.	Drivers	Team	LEC (France)	ZAN (Netherlands)		MNZ (Italy)	SPA (Belgium)			MIS (Italy)		MAG (France)		NÜR (Germany)	VAL (Spain)		BAR (Spain)	Points

=== Teams' Championship standings ===
Teams compete for their respective GT World Challenge Powered by AWS championships which are split into Overall, Gold, Silver and Bronze titles.

==== Overall Teams' standings ====
Pos.	Team	LEC (France)	BRH (United Kingdom)		ZAN (Netherlands)		MNZ (Italy)	SPA (Belgium)			MIS (Italy)		MAG (France)		NÜR (Germany)	VAL (Spain)		BAR (Spain)	Points
Pos.	Team	LEC (France)	S1	S2	S1	S2	MNZ (Italy)	6hrs	12hrs	24hrs	S1	S2	S1	S2	NÜR (Germany)	S1	S2	BAR (Spain)	Points
1	(Belgium) Team WRT	1	7	2	5	1	4	7	9	7	1	5	3	3	10^{P}	5	1	2	183.5
2	(United Kingdom) Garage 59	54	2	6	6	4	2	22	4	6^{P}	5	1^{P}	6	1^{P}	8	2	3	1	165
3	(United States) Mercedes-AMG Team Mann-Filter	4^{P}	6	1^{P}	3	9	1	2	7	10	4	2	4	7	2	3	6	13	158.5
4	(Germany) Rutronik Racing	2	9	3	1	5	10	4	6	2	7	3	2	5	3	14	5	7	155.5
5	(Austria) GRT - Grasser Racing Team	12	24	16	2	3	44	23	2	1	9	11	1^{P}	2	5	1	2^{P}	16	130
6	(Italy) AF Corse - Francorchamps Motors	15	1	4	9	14	20	5	3	3	2^{P}	4	11	4	45	8	16	4	96.5
7	(Germany) ROWE Racing	7					Ret	8	1	5					1			3	64
8	(France) Schumacher CLRT	3					6	73†	73†	Ret					4			9	45
9	(Belgium) Comtoyou Racing	5	27	14	15	8	3	6	54	Ret	17	9	7	9	7	11	17	34	44.5
10	(Switzerland) Emil Frey Racing		3^{P}	5	11	11^{P}					8	7	8	13		4	9		35
11	(Belgium) Boutsen VDS	28	13	10	8	10	26	18	18	27^{3}	18	6	5	6	9	30	4	19	31
12	(France) Saintéloc Racing	22	17	13	4	2	23	27	24	18	11	8	18	8	37	23	14	20	25.5
13	(Germany) Tresor Attempto Racing	21	14	11	10	6	13	16	44	47†	6	25	15	15	40	15	12	5	23.5
14	(Netherlands) Verstappen.com Racing	9					15	11	10	9					17			8	16
15	(France) CSA Racing	6	16	27	20	17	39	14	13	13	14	12	10	38	16	7	26	31	15
16	(Germany) GetSpeed	13					18^{P}	1	60†	Ret^{2}					22			14	15
17	(Italy) VSR	14					9	3	46	Ret					15			21	13
18	(Germany) HRT Ford Performance	11	28	25	Ret	21	19	29	11	35†	22	22	Ret	WD	6			43	10
19	(United Kingdom) Barwell Motorsport	44	10	7	7	29	36	48	38	34	16	16	16	11		Ret	18		9.5
20	(Germany) Walkenhorst Motorsport	8	25	18	Ret	27	12	35	29	14	13	13	23	16	14	29	27	10	8.5
21	(United Kingdom) Century Motorsport	24					7	30	20	23					19			23	8
22	(United Kingdom) Paradine Competition	18	12	17	19	7	22	34	27	Ret	20	18	17	19	21	13	7	22	8
23	(Switzerland) Kessel Racing	26			23	22	29	10	16	15	15	38	30	24	36	6^{P}	25	18	6.5
24	(Lithuania) Pure Rxcing	30					11	63	64†	Ret					11			11	2
24	(Germany) Lionspeed GP	38			18^{P}	32	40	42	12	21	28	29	26	32	33	10	23	26	2
Not classified
–	(United States) Winward Racing	33			Ret	30	14	26	26	17	27	31	27	23	41	16	34	Ret	0
–	(United States) Wright Motorsports							15	19	16					28				0
–	(United Kingdom) Team RJN	17					41	31	55	Ret					25			25	0
–	(Italy) Imperiale Racing				26	35					26	26	28	27		17	30		0
–	(United Kingdom) Steller Motorsport	19	26	23	Ret	23	32	19	52†	40					Ret			45	0
–	(Germany) Herberth Motorsport	20					28	32	23	25					23			Ret	0
–	(Japan) Goodsmile Racing							20	50	48									0
–	(Italy) Dinamic GT	55					45	21	43	30					32			29	0
–	(Austria) Razoon - more than racing										33	23							0
–	(United Kingdom) Optimum Motorsport	52					24	43	39	39					29			41	0
–	(Italy) UNX Racing										36	35	36	29	34	24	32	46	0
–	(United Kingdom) Ziggo Sport Tempesta	48			30	33	37	37	25	50†	31	34	32	31	Ret	27	24	39	0
–	(United Kingdom) Greystone GT																	24	0
–	(Bahrain) 2 Seas Motorsport							56	40	26					31			44	0
–	(Italy) BMW Italia Ceccato racing	Ret					30	57	42	49†					39			32	0
–	(Germany) Ring Racing	51					33	47	35	37					52			30	0
–	(Germany) Paul Motorsport	49					31	45	32	42					43			37	0
–	(Germany) Rinaldi Racing	41					38	44	49	41					DNS			38	0
–	(Malaysia) Johor Motorsports JMR							61	51	43									0
Pos.	Team	LEC (France)	S1	S2	S1	S2	MNZ (Italy)	6hrs	12hrs	24hrs	S1	S2	S1	S2	NÜR (Germany)	S1	S2	BAR (Spain)	Points
Pos.	Team	LEC (France)	BRH (United Kingdom)		ZAN (Netherlands)		MNZ (Italy)	SPA (Belgium)			MIS (Italy)		MAG (France)		NÜR (Germany)	VAL (Spain)		BAR (Spain)	Points

==== Gold Teams' standings ====
Pos.	Team	LEC (France)	BRH (United Kingdom)		ZAN (Netherlands)		MNZ (Italy)	SPA (Belgium)			MIS (Italy)		MAG (France)		NÜR (Germany)	VAL (Spain)		BAR (Spain)	Points
Pos.	Team	LEC (France)	S1	S2	S1	S2	MNZ (Italy)	6hrs	12hrs	24hrs	S1	S2	S1	S2	NÜR (Germany)	S1	S2	BAR (Spain)	Points
1	(Belgium) Team WRT	3	5	1	3	3	1	4	5	5	Ret	4	2	4	1	4	2	2	200
2	(United Kingdom) Garage 59	Ret^{P}	2	4	Ret	5	Ret^{P}	6	3	2	1	3	1	2	Ret^{P}	1^{P}	4^{P}	1^{P}	166
3	(Netherlands) Verstappen.com Racing	2					2	1	1	1					3			3	121
4	(Switzerland) Emil Frey Racing		1^{P}	2^{P}	2	1^{P}					Ret^{P}	1	5^{P}	6^{P}		2	1		118.5
5	(France) CSA Racing	1	6	6			Ret	2	2	3					2	3	6	5	117
6	(Germany) Tresor Attempto Racing	6	3	3	4	2	3	12	10	9	3	5	3	3	Ret	5	5	Ret	114
7	(France) Saintéloc Racing		4	5	1^{P}	4					2	2^{P}	4	1		6	3		101.5
8	(United Kingdom) Team RJN	4					7	7	11	Ret					5			4	48
9	(United Kingdom) Optimum Motorsport	8					4	8	9	7					7			7	42
10	(Germany) Paul Motorsport	7					5	9	7	8					8			6	41
10	(Germany) Herberth Motorsport	5					Ret	11	6	10^{P}					4				33
12	(Germany) Ring Racing						6	10	8	6									23
13	(United Kingdom) Barwell Motorsport										Ret	6	6	5					15
Pos.	Team	LEC (France)	S1	S2	S1	S2	MNZ (Italy)	6hrs	12hrs	24hrs	S1	S2	S1	S2	NÜR (Germany)	S1	S2	BAR (Spain)	Points
Pos.	Team	LEC (France)	BRH (United Kingdom)		ZAN (Netherlands)		MNZ (Italy)	SPA (Belgium)			MIS (Italy)		MAG (France)		NÜR (Germany)	VAL (Spain)		BAR (Spain)	Points

==== Silver Teams' standings ====
Pos.	Team	LEC (France)	BRH (United Kingdom)		ZAN (Netherlands)		MNZ (Italy)	SPA (Belgium)			MIS (Italy)		MAG (France)		NÜR (Germany)	VAL (Spain)		BAR (Spain)	Points
Pos.	Team	LEC (France)	S1	S2	S1	S2	MNZ (Italy)	6hrs	12hrs	24hrs	S1	S2	S1	S2	NÜR (Germany)	S1	S2	BAR (Spain)	Points
1	(Belgium) Boutsen VDS	11	3	1^{P}	2	5	7	2	1	5	Ret	2	3	2	1	Ret	1^{P}	3	173
2	(Germany) Tresor Attempto Racing	4	7	2	1^{P}	2	3	1	12	Ret	1^{P}	6	Ret	6	Ret	Ret	5	1	144
3	(United Kingdom) Paradine Competition	1	2	5	7	3	6	9	3	Ret	7	5	4	4	5	3	2	9	139
4	(France) Saintéloc Racing	3	5^{P}	3	3	1^{P}	Ret	5	7	2	2	8	7	3	13	Ret	8	4	129
5	(Belgium) Comtoyou Racing	10	9	4	4	4	Ret^{P}	12	11	Ret	3	1^{P}	1	1^{P}	7	2^{P}	6	16	110
6	(Belgium) Team WRT	14	6	6	Ret	7	2	8	4	4	4	3	5	7	6	1	3	17	110
7	(United Kingdom) Century Motorsport	5					1	7	2	3^{P}					3			5	90
8	(Italy) AF Corse - Francorchamps Motors		1	7	9	6					5	4	2^{P}	8		5	7		62.5
9	(United Kingdom) Steller Motorsport	2	8	8	Ret	8	8	3	10	8					Ret			14	45
10	(Germany) Rutronik Racing		4	Ret	5	10					6	9	6	5		6	4		42
11	(Germany) GetSpeed	7					4	13	13	Ret					8			2	40
12	(Germany) HRT Ford Performance	9					5	6	6	7					4			13	38
13	(Germany) Walkenhorst Motorsport	12					12	10	5	1					12			Ret	30
14	(Austria) GRT - Grasser Racing Team	8	10	Ret	6	9	13	11	8	Ret	8	7	8	9	14	4	Ret	15	27.5
15	(Italy) Dinamic GT	15					14	4	9	6					10			8	23
16	(United Kingdom) Garage 59														2^{P}			10^{P}	22
17	(Italy) VSR	6^{P}					9	14	15	Ret					15			12	12
18	(United Kingdom) Barwell Motorsport	13	11	9	8	11	10												4
19	(France) CSA Racing	Ret					11	15	16	Ret					11			Ret	1
20	(Germany) Rinaldi Racing														DNS			11	1
Not classified
–	(United Kingdom) Greystone GT																	6	0
Pos.	Team	LEC (France)	S1	S2	S1	S2	MNZ (Italy)	6hrs	12hrs	24hrs	S1	S2	S1	S2	NÜR (Germany)	S1	S2	BAR (Spain)	Points
Pos.	Team	LEC (France)	BRH (United Kingdom)		ZAN (Netherlands)		MNZ (Italy)	SPA (Belgium)			MIS (Italy)		MAG (France)		NÜR (Germany)	VAL (Spain)		BAR (Spain)	Points

==== Bronze Teams' standings ====
Pos.	Team	LEC (France)	ZAN (Netherlands)		MNZ (Italy)	SPA (Belgium)			MIS (Italy)		MAG (France)		NÜR (Germany)	VAL (Spain)		BAR (Spain)	Points
Pos.	Team	LEC (France)	S1	S2	MNZ (Italy)	6hrs	12hrs	24hrs	S1	S2	S1	S2	NÜR (Germany)	S1	S2	BAR (Spain)	Points
1	(Switzerland) Kessel Racing	1	3	1^{P}	9	1	2	1	1^{P}	10^{P}	5	2^{P}	5^{P}	1^{P}	3	3^{P}	202
2	(Germany) Lionspeed GP	6	1^{P}	5	14	6	1	4	5	3	1	7	2	2	1	5	152
3	(United States) Winward Racing	3	Ret	3	2	4	7	2	4	4	2	1	10	3	10	Ret	128.5
4	(United Kingdom) Paradine Competition	2	2	4	6	8	15	Ret	2	9	6	11	Ret	Ret	11^{P}	4	85
5	(France) Saintéloc Racing	5	10	11	5	5	5	3	9	8	10	9	6	10	7	6	76.5
6	(Germany) Rutronik Racing	7			1	18	16	13					4			1	69
7	(Italy) Imperiale Racing		6	8					3	1	3	3		4	6		66
8	(Germany) Tresor Attempto Racing	12	5	12	Ret	11	18	Ret^{P}	6	11	4	5	9	Ret	5	2	52.5
9	(United Kingdom) Ziggo Sport Tempesta	11	9	6	12	3	6	16	7	6	7	6	Ret	9	2	8	50.5
10	(Germany) Herberth Motorsport	4			8	2	4	6					7			Ret	50
11	(Italy) UNX Racing								11	7	11	4	3	7	8	11	34
12	(United Kingdom) Garage 59	14^{P}			3^{P}	10	3	5									34
13	(France) CSA Racing		4	2					12	2	Ret	WD					31.5
14	(Bahrain) 2 Seas Motorsport												1			10	26
15	(Italy) AF Corse - Francorchamps Motors	9			4	12	8	9					12			9	24
16	(Belgium) Comtoyou Racing	10	8	10	WD	19	19	Ret	10	5	8^{P}	10	13	8	12	12	18
17	(Austria) GRT - Grasser Racing Team		7	9					Ret	Ret				5	9		13
18	(Italy) BMW Italia Ceccato racing	13			10	14	11	15					8			7	12
19	(Germany) Rinaldi Racing	8			13	7	13	11									9
20	(United Kingdom) Barwell Motorsport					9	9	10									6
Pos.	Team	LEC (France)	S1	S2	MNZ (Italy)	6hrs	12hrs	24hrs	S1	S2	S1	S2	NÜR (Germany)	S1	S2	BAR (Spain)	Points
Pos.	Team	LEC (France)	ZAN (Netherlands)		MNZ (Italy)	SPA (Belgium)			MIS (Italy)		MAG (France)		NÜR (Germany)	VAL (Spain)		BAR (Spain)	Points

== See also ==
- 2025 GT World Challenge Europe Sprint Cup
- 2025 GT World Challenge Europe Endurance Cup
- 2025 GT World Challenge America
- 2025 GT World Challenge Asia
- 2025 GT World Challenge Australia
- 2025 Intercontinental GT Challenge
