= Ben Dörr =

German racing driver (born 2005)

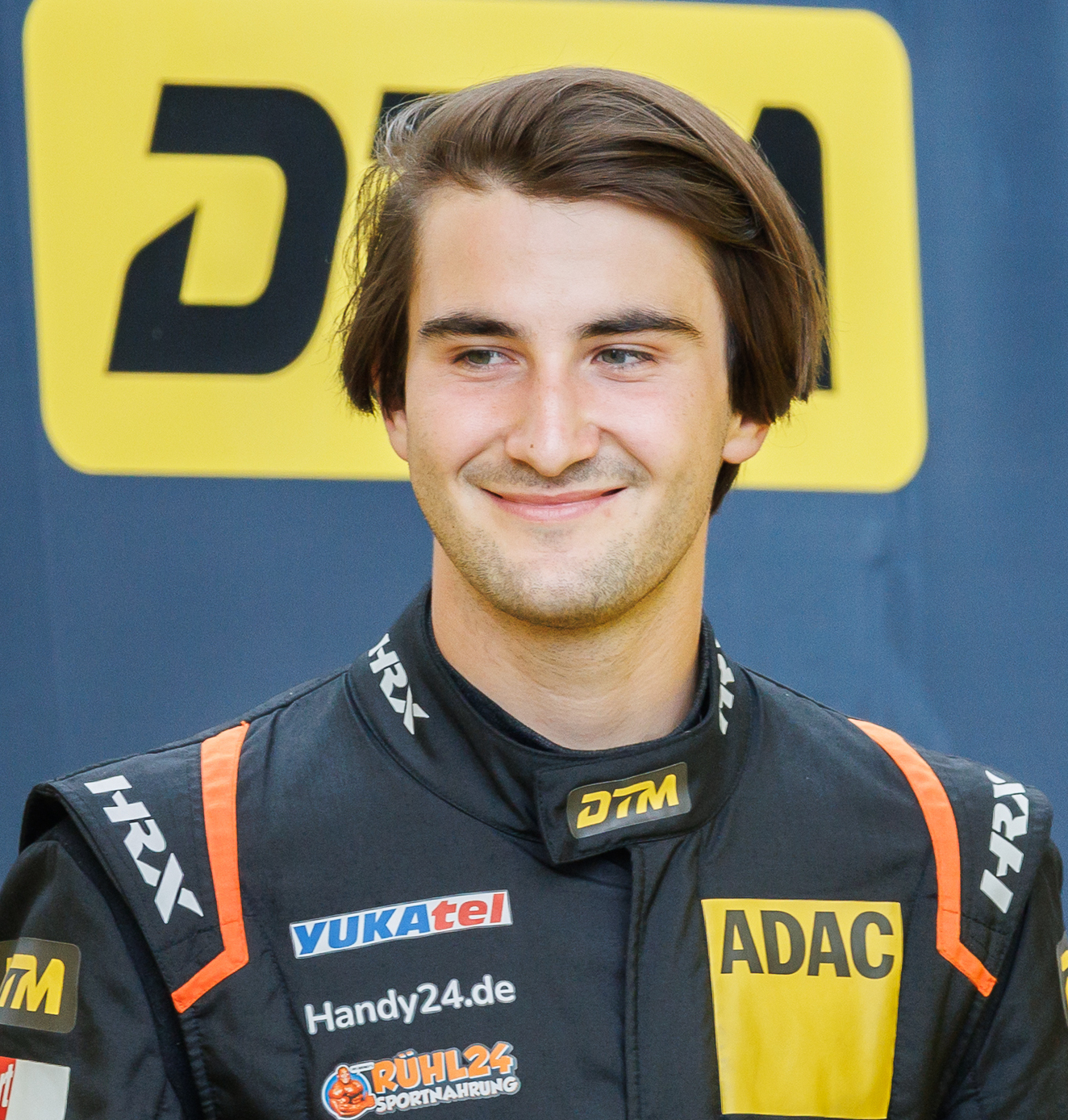
- Dörr in 2026
- Nationality: German
- Born: 25 January 2005 (age 21) Lich, Germany

Deutsche Tourenwagen Masters career
- Debut season: 2024
- Current team: Dörr Motorsport
- Categorisation: FIA Silver (2021–2026); FIA Gold (2027–)
- Starts: 48
- Championships: 0
- Wins: 2
- Podiums: 3
- Poles: 1
- Fastest laps: 1
- Best finish: 7th in 2026

Previous series
- 2021–23 2021: ADAC GT4 Germany; GT4 European Series

Ben Dörr (born 25 January 2005 in Lich) is a German racing driver currently competing in the Deutsche Tourenwagen Masters with Dörr Motorsport.

== Career ==
In 2021, Dörr made his car racing debut in the ADAC GT4 Germany championship. Alongside Nico Hantke, he finished the season in seventh place with one podium scored at Hockenheimring. That year he also appeared as a guest in Nürburgring round of GT4 European Series.

For the 2022 season, Dörr stayed in the ADAC GT4 Germany. That season, alongside Romain Leroux, he finished second in the championship, even though he has not finished on the top step of the podium.

2023 season saw Dörr staying in ADAC GT4 Germany series, as well as him making his debut in Nürburgring Langstrecken-Serie. He competed as a guest in eight races. In five of them, he competed in SP9 Pro class driving an Aston Martin Vantage AMR GT3, and in remaining three races, he competed in SP8T class driving an Aston Martin Vantage AMR GT4. He also took part in the 2023 24 Hours of Nürburgring in SP9 Pro-Am class, even though the car retired from the race after 62 laps.

On March 11, 2024, it was announced that Dörr would make his Deutsche Tourenwagen Masters debut driving for Dörr Motorsport in a McLaren 720S GT3 Evo. He finished the DTM season in 16th place with four points to his name. He also secured a fastest lap during the first race at Circuit Zandvoort. He also took part in 2024 24 Hours of Nürburgring in SP11 Pro-Am class, and won the class driving a KTM X-Bow GT2.

== Karting record ==
=== Karting career summary ===
Season	Series	Position
2014	Rotax Max Challenge Germany — Micro	6th
2015	Rotax Max Challenge Germany — Micro	**2nd**
2016	Rotax Max Challenge Germany — Mini	**1st**
2016	RMC Grand Finals — Mini Max	21st
2017	German Kart Championship — OKJ	27th
2017	ADAC Kart Masters — OKJ	11th
2017	Rotax Max Challenge Germany — Junior	**1st**
2018	German Kart Championship — OKJ	**3rd**
2018	Andrea Margutti Trophy - OKJ	9th
2018	CIK-FIA European Championship — OKJ	48th
2018	Rotax Max Challenge Germany — Junior	**1st**
2019	South Garda Winter Cup — OK	49th
2019	WSK Super Master Series — OK	44th
2019	CIK-FIA European Championship — OK	71st
2019	WSK Euro Series — OK	25th
2019	CIK-FIA World Championship — OK	21st
2019	WSK Open Cup — OK	45th
2019	German Kart Championship — OK	8th
2020	South Garda Winter Cup — OK	19th
2020	WSK Super Master Series — OK	78th
2020	Champions of the Future — OK	NC
2020	CIK-FIA European Championship — OK	64th
2021	CIK-FIA European Championship — KZ2	NC
2021	ADAC Kart Masters — KZ2	NC
2021	DMSB Schaltkart-Cup	8th
2022	CIK-FIA European Championship — KZ	NC
2022	Trofeo delle Industrie — KZ2	12th
2022	WSK Final Cup — KZ2	47th

=== Complete CIK-FIA Karting European Championship results ===
(key) (Races in bold indicate pole position) (Races in italics indicate fastest lap)

Year	Team	Class	1	2	3	4	5	6	7	8	DC	Points
2018	TB Racing Team	OKJ	SAR; QH	SAR; R	PFI; QH	PFI; R	AMP; QH; 22	AMP; R 26	ESS; QH; 56	ESS; R DNQ	76th	0
2019	TB Racing Team	OK	ANG; QH	ANG; R	GEN; QH; 15	GEN; R 4	KRI; QH	KRI; R	LMS; QH	LMS; R	71st	0
2020	TB Racing Team	OK	ZUE; QH; 56	ZUE; R DNQ	SAR; QH; 38	SAR; R DNQ	WAC; QH; 29	WAC; R 23			64th	0
2021		KZ2	WAC; QH; 67	WAC; R DNQ	ADR; QH	ADR; R					NC	0
2022		KZ	GEN; QH; 26	GEN; R 26	CRE; QH	CRE; R					NC	0

=== Complete Karting World Championship results ===
Year	Team	Class	Main race
2019	(Germany) TB Racing Team	OK	**21st**

== Racing record ==
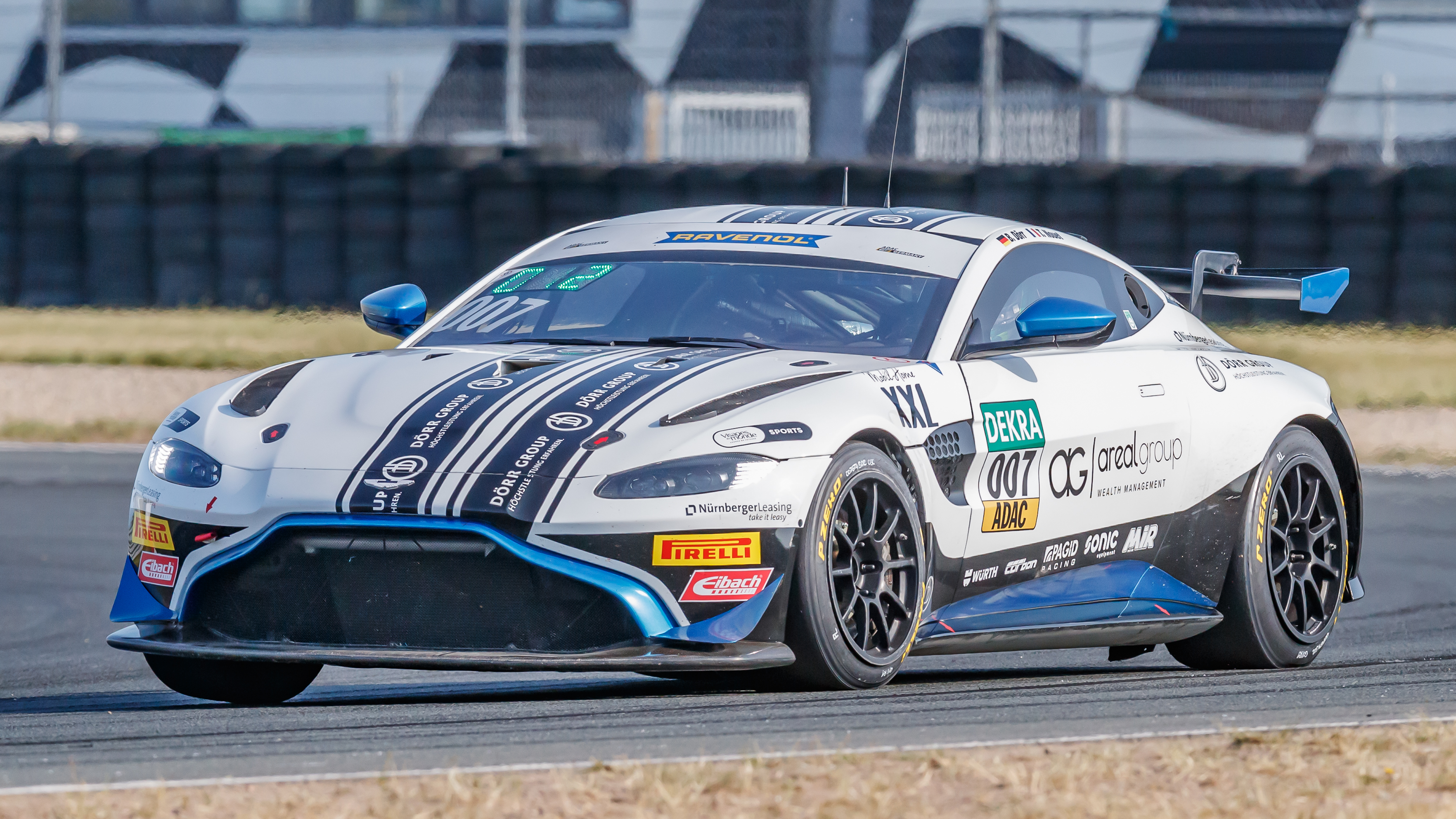
Dörr competing in the 2023 ADAC GT4 Germany Oschersleben round.

=== Racing career summary ===
Season	Series	Team	Races	Wins	Poles	F/Laps	Podiums	Points	Position
2021	ADAC GT4 Germany	Dörr Motorsport	12	0	1	0	1	96	7th
2021	GT4 European Series - Silver	Dörr Motorsport	2	0	0	0	0	0	NC
2022	ADAC GT4 Germany	Dörr Motorsport	12	0	0	1	5	154	2nd
2023	ADAC GT4 Germany	Dörr Motorsport	5	0	0	0	1	29	22nd
2023	Nürburgring Langstrecken-Serie - SP9 Pro	Dörr Motorsport	5	0	0	0	2	0	NC†
2023	Nürburgring Langstrecken-Serie - SP8T	Dörr Motorsport	3	2	0	0	3	0	NC†
2023	24 Hours of Nürburgring - SP9 Pro-Am	Dörr Motorsport	1	0	0	0	0	N/A	DNF
2024	Deutsche Tourenwagen Masters	Dörr Motorsport	16	0	0	1	0	4	23rd
2024	Nürburgring Langstrecken-Serie - SP9 Pro	Dörr Motorsport	1	0	0	0	0	0	NC†
2024	Nürburgring Langstrecken-Serie - SP11 Pro-Am	Dörr Motorsport	2	1	2	1	1	0	NC†
2024	24 Hours of Nürburgring - SP11 Pro-Am	Dörr Motorsport	1	1	0	0	1	N/A	**1st**
2025	Deutsche Tourenwagen Masters	Dörr Motorsport	16	0	1	0	0	47	17th
2025	Nürburgring Langstrecken-Serie - SP9 Pro-Am	Dörr Motorsport							
2025	ADAC GT Masters	Dörr Motorsport	2	1	0	0	2	0	NC†
2025	24 Hours of Nürburgring - SP 8T	Dörr Motorsport	1	1	0	0	1	N/A	**1st**
2025	GT World Challenge Europe Endurance Cup	Team RJN	1	0	0	0	0	0	NC
2026	Deutsche Tourenwagen Masters	Dörr Motorsport	16	2	0	0	3	139	7th
2026	Nürburgring Langstrecken-Serie - SP9	Dörr Motorsport							
2026	24 Hours of Nürburgring - SP9	Dörr Motorsport	1	0	0	0	0	N/A	14th
2026	GT World Challenge Europe Endurance Cup	Team RJN	5	0	0	0	0	8	27th
2026	International GT Open	SMC Motorsport	2	0	0	0	0	1	41st

^{†} As Dörr was a guest driver, he was ineligible to score points. * Season still in progress

=== Complete ADAC GT4 Germany results ===
(key) (Races in bold indicate pole position) (Races in italics indicate fastest lap)

Year	Team	Car	1	2	3	4	5	6	7	8	9	10	11	12	DC	Points
2021	Dörr Motorsport	McLaren 570S GT4	OSC; 1; 15	OSC; 2; 13	RBR; 1; 11	RBR; 2; 4	ZAN; 1; 14	ZAN; 2; 7	SAC; 1 Ret	SAC; 2; 24	HOC; 1; 10	HOC; 2; 2	**NÜR**; **1**; 4	NÜR; 2; 6	7th	96
2022	Dörr Motorsport	Aston Martin Vantage AMR GT4	OSC; 1; 2	OSC; 2 DSQ	RBR; 1; 2	RBR; 2 Ret	ZAN; 1; 2	ZAN; 2; 2	NÜR; 1; 5	NÜR; 2; 6	SAC; 1; 4	SAC; 2; 2	HOC; 1; 9	HOC; 2; 4	2nd	154
2023	Dörr Motorsport	Aston Martin Vantage AMR GT4	OSC; 1; 15	OSC; 2 DNS	ZAN; 1; 17	ZAN; 2; 13	NÜR; 1; 3	NÜR; 2; 7	LAU; 1	LAU; 2	SAC; 1	SAC; 2	HOC; 1	HOC; 2	22nd	29

=== Complete 24 Hours of Nürburgring results ===
Year	Team	Co-Drivers	Car	Class	Laps	Pos.	Class Pos.
2023	(Germany) Dörr Motorsport	(Germany) Phil Dörr (Germany) Peter Posavac (United Kingdom) Darren Turner	Aston Martin Vantage AMR GT3	SP9 Pro-Am	62	DNF	DNF
2024	(Germany) Dörr Motorsport	(Germany) Christian Gebhardt (Austria) Max Hofer (Germany) Fabian Vettel	KTM X-Bow GT2	SP11 Pro-Am	45	31st	**1st**
2025	(Germany) Dörr Motorsport	(Germany) Phil Dörr (Germany) Mike David Ortmann (Germany) Volker Strycek	McLaren Artura Trophy	SP 8T	131	19th	**1st**
2026	(Germany) Dörr Motorsport	(Germany) Timo Glock (Germany) Marvin Kirchhöfer (Germany) Timo Scheider	McLaren 720S GT3 Evo	SP9 Pro	150	15th	8th

=== Complete Deutsche Tourenwagen Masters results ===
(key) (Races in bold indicate pole position) (Races in italics indicate fastest lap)

Year	Team	Car	1	2	3	4	5	6	7	8	9	10	11	12	13	14	15	16	Pos	Points
2024	Dörr Motorsport	McLaren 720S GT3 Evo	OSC; 1 Ret	OSC; 2; 16	LAU; 1; 18	LAU; 2; 15	ZAN; 1; 16	ZAN; 2; 15	NOR; 1 Ret	NOR; 2; 16	NÜR; 1; 19	NÜR; 2; 14	SAC; 1; 16	SAC; 2 Ret	RBR; 1; 17	RBR; 2; 17	HOC; 1; 18	HOC; 2; 18	23rd	4
2025	Dörr Motorsport	McLaren 720S GT3 Evo	OSC; 1; 11	OSC; 2; 8	LAU; 1; 9	LAU; 2; 18	ZAN; 1; 13	ZAN; 2 DSQ	NOR; 1; 17	NOR; 2; 15	NÜR; 1; 8	**NÜR**; **2**; 8^{1}	SAC; 1; 19	SAC; 2 DSQ	RBR; 1; 13	RBR; 2; 17	HOC; 1; 20	HOC; 2; 15	17th	47
2026	Dörr Motorsport	McLaren 720S GT3 Evo	RBR; 1 Ret^{2}	RBR; 2; 7	ZAN; 1; 5	ZAN; 2; 2	LAU; 1; 1	LAU; 2; 16	NOR; 1; 10	NOR; 2; 13	OSC; 1 Ret	OSC; 2; 15	NÜR; 1; 4	NÜR; 2 Ret^{2}	SAC; 1; 10	SAC; 2; 1	HOC; 1; 11	HOC; 2; 5	7th	139

=== Complete GT World Challenge Europe results ===
==== GT World Challenge Europe Endurance Cup ====
(key) (Races in bold indicate pole position) (Races in italics indicate fastest lap)

Year	Team	Car	Class	1	2	3	4	5	6	7	Pos.	Points
2025	Team RJN	McLaren 720S GT3 Evo	Gold	LEC	MNZ	SPA; 6H; 31	SPA; 12H; 55	SPA; 24H; Ret	NÜR	CAT	19th	3
2026	Team RJN	McLaren 720S GT3 Evo	Silver	LEC; 32	MNZ; 6	SPA; 6H; 59	SPA; 12H; 50	SPA; 24H; 35	NÜR; 39	ALG; 23	16th	30
