= 2025 Deutsche Tourenwagen Masters =

Car racing championship

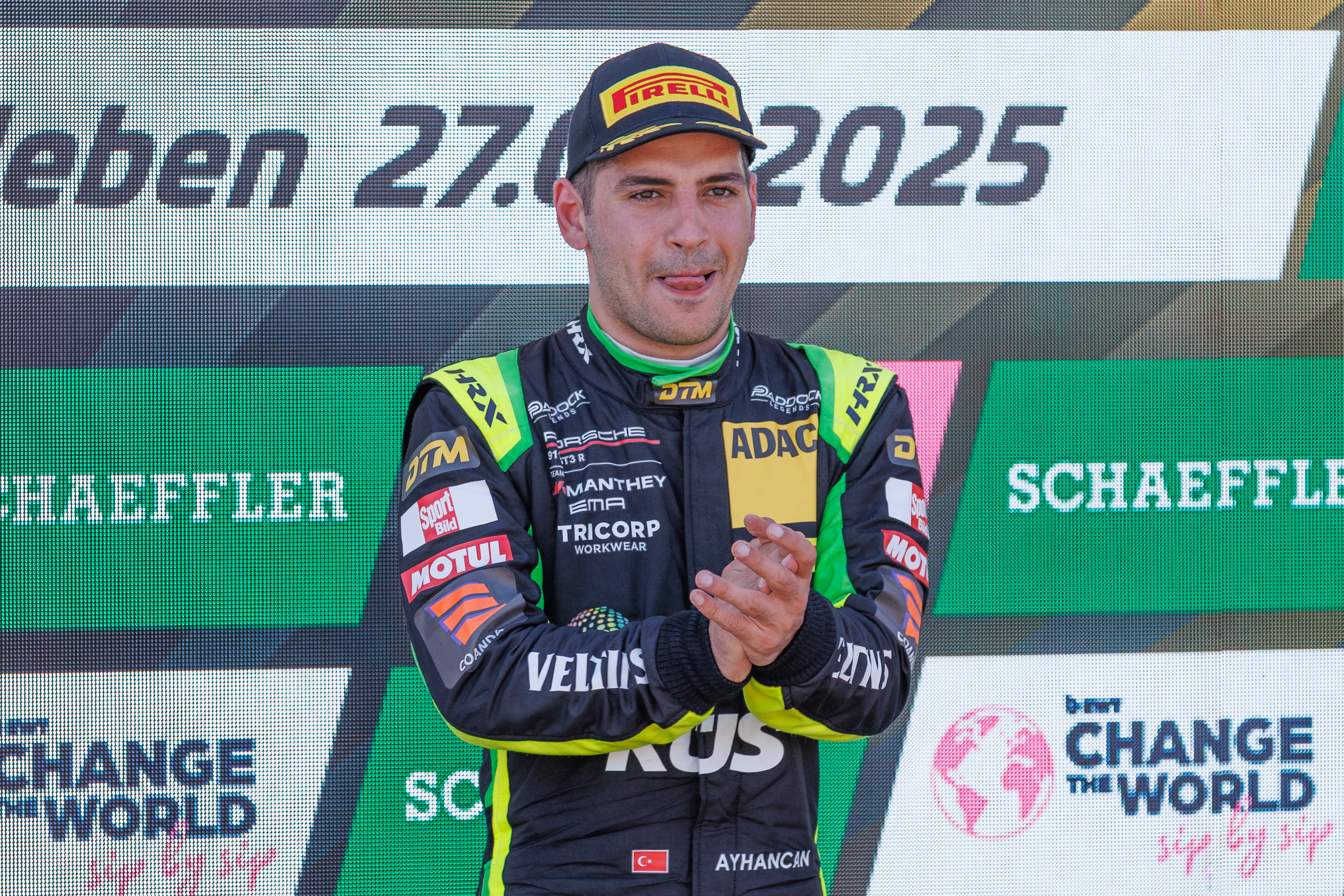
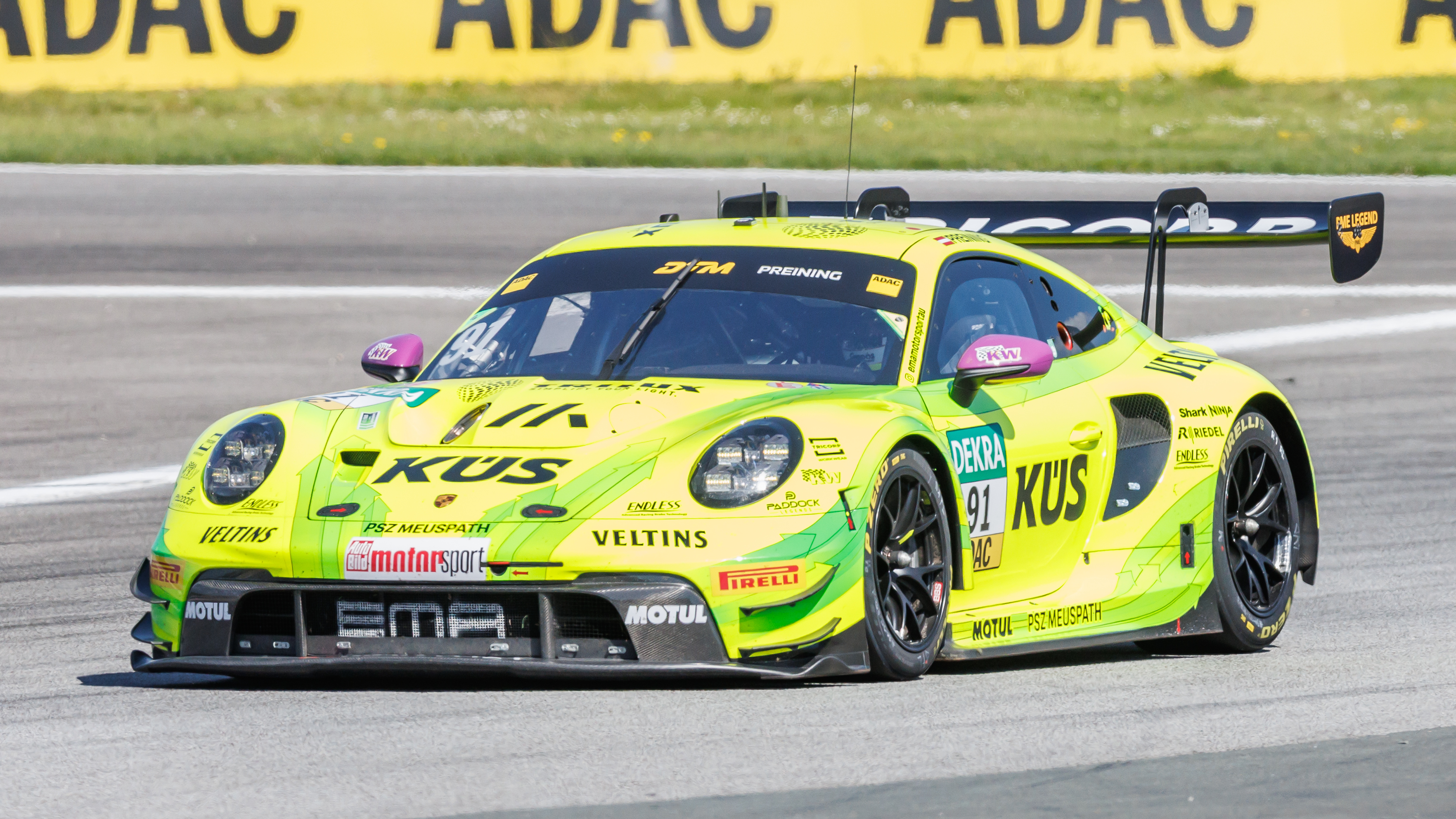
Ayhancan Güven (left) was the driver's champion, while Manthey EMA (right) was the teams' champion.

The 2025 Deutsche Tourenwagen Masters was the thirty-ninth season of the premier German touring car championship, as well as the twenty-sixth season under the moniker of Deutsche Tourenwagen Masters since the series' resumption in 2000. It was the fifth season of the DTM to be run under Group GT3 regulations, and the third under ADAC's promotion.

== Teams and drivers ==
All teams competed with tyres supplied by Pirelli.

Manufacturer	Car	Engine	Team	No.	Driver	Status	Rounds	Ref.
Aston Martin	Aston Martin Vantage AMR GT3 Evo	Aston Martin AMR16A 4.0 L Turbo V8	(Belgium) Comtoyou Racing	7	(Belgium) Gilles Magnus	R	All	
Aston Martin	Aston Martin Vantage AMR GT3 Evo	Aston Martin AMR16A 4.0 L Turbo V8	(Belgium) Comtoyou Racing	8	(Belgium) Nicolas Baert	R	All	
Audi	Audi R8 LMS Evo II	Audi DAR 5.2 L V10	(Germany) Land-Motorsport	29	(Switzerland) Ricardo Feller		All	
BMW	BMW M4 GT3 Evo	BMW P58 3.0 L Twin Turbo I6	(Germany) Schubert Motorsport	11	(Germany) Marco Wittmann		All	
BMW	BMW M4 GT3 Evo	BMW P58 3.0 L Twin Turbo I6	(Germany) Schubert Motorsport	33	(Germany) René Rast		All	
Ferrari	Ferrari 296 GT3	Ferrari F163CE 3.0 L Twin Turbo V6	(Switzerland) Emil Frey Racing	10	(United Kingdom) Ben Green		All	
Ferrari	Ferrari 296 GT3	Ferrari F163CE 3.0 L Twin Turbo V6	(Switzerland) Emil Frey Racing	14	(United Kingdom) Jack Aitken		All	
Ferrari	Ferrari 296 GT3	Ferrari F163CE 3.0 L Twin Turbo V6	(Switzerland) Emil Frey Racing	69	(Netherlands) Thierry Vermeulen		All	
Ford	Ford Mustang GT3	Ford Coyote 5.4 L V8	(Germany) HRT Ford Performance	36	(India) Arjun Maini		All	
Ford	Ford Mustang GT3	Ford Coyote 5.4 L V8	(Germany) HRT Ford Performance	64	(Switzerland) Fabio Scherer	R	All	
Lamborghini	Lamborghini Huracán GT3 Evo 2	Lamborghini DGF 5.2 L V10	(Germany) Abt Sportsline	1	(Italy) Mirko Bortolotti		All	
Lamborghini	Lamborghini Huracán GT3 Evo 2	Lamborghini DGF 5.2 L V10	(Germany) Abt Sportsline	2	(Denmark) Nicki Thiim		All	
Lamborghini	Lamborghini Huracán GT3 Evo 2	Lamborghini DGF 5.2 L V10	(Austria) TGI Team Lamborghini by GRT	19	(Germany) Luca Engstler		All	
Lamborghini	Lamborghini Huracán GT3 Evo 2	Lamborghini DGF 5.2 L V10	(Austria) TGI Team Lamborghini by GRT	63	(South Africa) Jordan Pepper		All	
Lamborghini	Lamborghini Huracán GT3 Evo 2	Lamborghini DGF 5.2 L V10	(Germany) Paul Motorsport	71	(Germany) Maximilian Paul		All	
McLaren	McLaren 720S GT3 Evo	McLaren M840T 4.0 L Twin Turbo V8	(Germany) Dörr Motorsport	16	(Germany) Timo Glock		All	
McLaren	McLaren 720S GT3 Evo	McLaren M840T 4.0 L Twin Turbo V8	(Germany) Dörr Motorsport	25	(Germany) Ben Dörr	R	All	
Mercedes-AMG	Mercedes-AMG GT3 Evo	Mercedes-AMG M159 6.2 L V8	(Germany) Mercedes-AMG Team Landgraf	22	(Austria) Lucas Auer		All	
Mercedes-AMG	Mercedes-AMG GT3 Evo	Mercedes-AMG M159 6.2 L V8	(Germany) Mercedes-AMG Team Landgraf	84	(Germany) Tom Kalender	R	All	
Mercedes-AMG	Mercedes-AMG GT3 Evo	Mercedes-AMG M159 6.2 L V8	(United States) / Mercedes-AMG Team Winward (Note: Car No. 24 entered as Mercedes-AMG Team Winward, car No. 48 entered as Mercedes-AMG Team Mann-Filter. Both cars share a teams' championship entry as "Winward Racing".); (United States) / Mercedes-AMG Team Mann-Filter	24	(Germany) Maro Engel		All	
Mercedes-AMG	Mercedes-AMG GT3 Evo	Mercedes-AMG M159 6.2 L V8	(United States) / Mercedes-AMG Team Winward; (United States) / Mercedes-AMG Team Mann-Filter	48	(France) Jules Gounon		All	
Porsche	Porsche 911 GT3 R (992)	Porsche M97/80 4.2 L Flat-6	(Germany) / Manthey EMA (Note: Cars No. 90 and No. 91 entered as Manthey EMA, car No. 92 entered as Manthey Junior Team. All three cars share a teams' championship entry as "Manthey".); (Germany) / Manthey Junior Team	90	(Turkey) Ayhancan Güven		All	
Porsche	Porsche 911 GT3 R (992)	Porsche M97/80 4.2 L Flat-6	(Germany) / Manthey EMA; (Germany) / Manthey Junior Team	91	(Austria) Thomas Preining		All	
Porsche	Porsche 911 GT3 R (992)	Porsche M97/80 4.2 L Flat-6	(Germany) / Manthey EMA; (Germany) / Manthey Junior Team	92	(Netherlands) Morris Schuring	R	All	

Icon	Status
R	Rookie
G	Guest drivers ineligible for points

=== Driver and team changes ===
- Aston Martin returned to DTM for the first time since 2019, as Belgian team Comtoyou Racing made its debut with a pair of Belgian rookies: former Audi factory driver Gilles Magnus and Nicolas Baert, the son of team owner Jean-Michel Baert.
- Schubert Motorsport scaled back to two entries, as 2022 champion Sheldon van der Linde left the series to focus on his LMDh duties.
- Emil Frey Racing expanded its entry to three cars, promoting Ben Green from its GT World Challenge Europe Sprint Cup set-up.
- Ford will make its DTM debut via a new partnership with former Mercedes-AMG customer Haupt Racing Team. HRT stalwart Arjun Maini was joined by returnee Fabio Scherer, who had previously entered the final Class 1 season in 2020 for WRT.
- Abt Sportsline switched to Lamborghini after 25 years with Audi. Kelvin van der Linde and Ricardo Feller both left the team as they changed manufacturers to BMW and Porsche respectively. Reigning champion Mirko Bortolotti and Nicki Thiim moved over from SSR Performance, which left the series, to form Abt's lineup.
- GT World Challenge Europe Endurance Cup runner-up Jordan Pepper joined TGI Team Lamborghini by GRT after a one-off appearance with the team in 2024.
- Timo Glock returned to the championship after two years away, joining Dörr Motorsport in place of Clemens Schmid, who will compete in the FIA WEC with Akkodis ASP.
- Team Landgraf returned to the series after a year away. The team welcomed Lucas Auer from Team Winward, while 17-year-old ADAC GT Masters champion Tom Kalender is set to become the youngest ever DTM driver.
- Winward Racing hired Jules Gounon for a full season after a one-off for HRT at the 2024 season finale.
- Manthey Racing expanded their presence with a third car under Manthey Junior Team, signing Le Mans class winner Morris Schuring.
- Allied Racing was scheduled to make its DTM debut fielding two Porsche 911 GT3 R (992) cars for Ricardo Feller and Bastian Buus. However, the plans fell through as the team filed for insolvency in March. In the aftermath, Land-Motorsport set up a last-minute programme for Feller, ensuring a continued presence for Audi in DTM and a record nine brands on the grid.

== Rule changes ==
- A new 'DTM Pro Climate' synthetic fuel developed by Coryton was introduced to the championship, along with new Pirelli P Zero DHG slick tyres.
- The race length was shortened from 1 hour plus one lap to 55 minutes plus one lap. In the event of a safety car, a maximum two extra laps may be added.
- The Sunday race changed in format, now mandating two pit stops instead of one. The first is to be served between minutes 10 and 25 of the race, with the second pit window spanning from minutes 39 to 45.
- A new rookie of the year classification was created. Any Gold- or Silver-rated driver in their first season of DTM is eligible for the award. Second-year drivers may also be admitted at the discretion of the committee. Dörr Motorsport's Ben Dörr and HRT Ford Performance's Fabio Scherer were granted this exception.

== Race calendar ==
Round	Circuit	Location	Race 1	Race 2
1	(Germany) Motorsport Arena Oschersleben	Oschersleben, Saxony-Anhalt	26 April	27 April
2	(Germany) Lausitzring	Klettwitz, Brandenburg	24 May	25 May
3	(Netherlands) Circuit Zandvoort	Zandvoort, North Holland	7 June	8 June
4	(Germany) Norisring	Nuremberg, Bavaria	5 July	6 July
5	(Germany) Nürburgring	Nürburg, Rhineland-Palatinate	9 August	10 August
6	(Germany) Sachsenring	Hohenstein-Ernstthal, Sachsen	23 August	24 August
7	(Austria) Red Bull Ring	Spielberg, Styria	13 September	14 September
8	(Germany) Hockenheimring	Hockenheim, Baden-Württemberg	4 October	5 October

== Results and standings ==
=== Season summary ===
Round		Circuit	Pole position	Fastest lap	Winning driver	Winning team	Winning manufacturer	Winning rookie
1	R1	(Germany) Motorsport Arena Oschersleben	(Austria) Lucas Auer (Note: Ben Green originally set the fastest time during qualifying, but was disqualified after being found to be underweight during post-qualifying inspection. Lucas Auer, who originally set the second fastest time, was promoted to pole position.)	(Austria) Lucas Auer	(Austria) Lucas Auer	(Germany) Mercedes-AMG Team Landgraf	(Germany) Mercedes-AMG	(Germany) Ben Dörr
1	R2	(Germany) Motorsport Arena Oschersleben	(France) Jules Gounon	(Germany) Maro Engel	(Turkey) Ayhancan Güven	(Germany) Manthey EMA	(Germany) Porsche	(Germany) Ben Dörr
2	R1	(Germany) Lausitzring	(Austria) Lucas Auer	(France) Jules Gounon	(Austria) Lucas Auer	(Germany) Mercedes-AMG Team Landgraf	(Germany) Mercedes-AMG	(Germany) Ben Dörr
2	R2	(Germany) Lausitzring	(United Kingdom) Jack Aitken	(Germany) René Rast	(United Kingdom) Jack Aitken	(Switzerland) Emil Frey Racing	(Italy) Ferrari	(Netherlands) Morris Schuring
3	R1	(Netherlands) Circuit Zandvoort	(South Africa) Jordan Pepper	(Turkey) Ayhancan Güven	(Turkey) Ayhancan Güven	(Germany) Manthey EMA	(Germany) Porsche	(Netherlands) Morris Schuring
3	R2	(Netherlands) Circuit Zandvoort	(Germany) René Rast	(United Kingdom) Jack Aitken	(Germany) René Rast	(Germany) Schubert Motorsport	(Germany) BMW	(Netherlands) Morris Schuring
4	R1	(Germany) Norisring	(South Africa) Jordan Pepper	(United Kingdom) Jack Aitken	(South Africa) Jordan Pepper	(Austria) TGI Team Lamborghini by GRT	(Italy) Lamborghini	(Belgium) Gilles Magnus
4	R2	(Germany) Norisring	(Netherlands) Thierry Vermeulen	(Austria) Thomas Preining	(Austria) Thomas Preining	(Germany) Manthey EMA	(Germany) Porsche	(Netherlands) Morris Schuring
5	R1	(Germany) Nürburgring	(United Kingdom) Jack Aitken	(Switzerland) Ricardo Feller	(United Kingdom) Jack Aitken	(Switzerland) Emil Frey Racing	(Italy) Ferrari	(Germany) Ben Dörr
5	R2	(Germany) Nürburgring	(Germany) Ben Dörr	(Germany) René Rast	(Germany) René Rast	(Germany) Schubert Motorsport	(Germany) BMW	(Belgium) Gilles Magnus
6	R1	(Germany) Sachsenring	(South Africa) Jordan Pepper	(Austria) Thomas Preining	(Turkey) Ayhancan Güven	(Germany) Manthey EMA	(Germany) Porsche	(Switzerland) Fabio Scherer
6	R2	(Germany) Sachsenring	(United Kingdom) Jack Aitken	(Austria) Thomas Preining (Note: Ben Dörr originally set the fastest lap, but was later disqualified due to a tyre regulation breach. Thomas Preining, who initially set the second fastest lap, was credited with the fastest lap of the race.)	(Turkey) Ayhancan Güven	(Germany) Manthey EMA	(Germany) Porsche	(Netherlands) Morris Schuring
7	R1	(Austria) Red Bull Ring	(Germany) Marco Wittmann	(Germany) Timo Glock	(Germany) René Rast	(Germany) Schubert Motorsport	(Germany) BMW	(Belgium) Gilles Magnus
7	R2	(Austria) Red Bull Ring	(Netherlands) Thierry Vermeulen	(United Kingdom) Jack Aitken	(Switzerland) Ricardo Feller	(Germany) Land-Motorsport	(Germany) Audi	(Germany) Tom Kalender
8	R1	(Germany) Hockenheimring	(United Kingdom) Ben Green	(Austria) Thomas Preining	(Austria) Thomas Preining	(Germany) Manthey EMA	(Germany) Porsche	(Netherlands) Morris Schuring
8	R2	(Germany) Hockenheimring	(Belgium) Gilles Magnus	(Turkey) Ayhancan Güven	(Turkey) Ayhancan Güven	(Germany) Manthey EMA	(Germany) Porsche	(Germany) Tom Kalender

=== Scoring system ===
Points were awarded to the top fifteen classified finishers as follows:

Position	**1st**	**2nd**	**3rd**	**4th**	**5th**	**6th**	**7th**	**8th**	**9th**	**10th**	**11th**	**12th**	**13th**	**14th**	**15th**
Race	25	20	16	13	11	10	9	8	7	6	5	4	3	2	1

Additionally, the top three placed drivers in qualifying also received points:

Qualifying Position	**1st**	**2nd**	**3rd**
Points	3	2	1

=== Drivers' championship ===
Pos.	Driver	OSC (Germany)		LAU (Germany)		ZAN (Netherlands)		NOR (Germany)		NÜR (Germany)		SAC (Germany)		RBR (Austria)		HOC (Germany)		Points
1	(Turkey) Ayhancan Güven	7	1	8	14	1	12	11	11	Ret	5	1	1^{3}	16	7	5	1^{2}	192
2	(Austria) Lucas Auer	**1**^{1}	10	**1**^{1}	9	4	7	6	8	6	3^{2}	10	8	12	3	12	4	188
3	(Germany) Maro Engel	3	12	2^{3}	5	9^{2}	5	3	4	Ret	4	9	6	5	4	4	3	184
4	(Austria) Thomas Preining	4^{3}	3	6	Ret^{3}	Ret	3	2	1	9	10	4	10^{2}	6	21	1^{3}	6	182
5	(Germany) Marco Wittmann	8	6	5	8^{2}	6	2^{3}	18	Ret	5	2	7	4	**2**^{1}	12	18	2	170
6	(Germany) René Rast	Ret	5	3	2	Ret	**1**^{1}	10	7	14	1	14	5	1^{2}	13	7	Ret	169
7	(South Africa) Jordan Pepper	2^{2}	4^{2}	11	4	**7**^{1}	Ret	**1**^{1}	9	4	9	**2**^{1}	Ret	7	6	Ret	DSQ	164
8	(United Kingdom) Jack Aitken	6	14	7	**1^{1}**	12	4^{2}	5	2^{2}	**1^{1}**	16	3	**15**^{1}	Ret	20^{3}	6^{2}	DSQ	162
9	(France) Jules Gounon	5	**2**^{1}	4	3	14	8	7	10	Ret	11	5^{2}	2	8	8	Ret	17	142
10	(Netherlands) Thierry Vermeulen	13	13^{3}	15	7	Ret	13	4^{3}	**3**^{1}	15^{2}	21	Ret	13	3	**2**^{1}	19	12	102
11	(Switzerland) Ricardo Feller	21	11	Ret^{2}	12	16	16	9	14	3	20	6	16	17	1^{2}	2	9	100
12	(Germany) Luca Engstler	10	7	Ret	Ret	10^{3}	6	Ret	Ret	7^{3}	13	11	12	10	10	9	8	81
13	(United Kingdom) Ben Green	18	15	10	Ret	15	17	Ret	6	2	15	Ret^{3}	3	4	Ret	**10^{1}**	Ret^{3}	79
14	(Italy) Mirko Bortolotti	9	9	13	6	8	9	15	Ret	Ret	14	15	Ret	15	9	11	7	68
15	(India) Arjun Maini	15	16	12	17	Ret	10	8	5^{3}	Ret	6	20	Ret	11	5	14	13	62
16	(Netherlands) Morris Schuring	16	17	Ret	11	5	11	14	12	Ret	12	17	7	19	18	3	14	58
17	(Germany) Ben Dörr	11	8	9	18	13	DSQ	17	15	8	**8**^{1}	19	DSQ	13	16	20	15	47
18	(Denmark) Nicki Thiim	14	Ret	14	13	2	14	20^{2}	Ret	12	18	16	Ret	20	15	8	16	44
19	(Germany) Maximilian Paul	12	19	Ret	19	3	18	16	Ret	11	Ret	12	14	Ret	Ret	16	10	37
20	(Belgium) Gilles Magnus	DSQ	21	18	16	Ret	19	12	Ret	16	7^{3}	18	9	9^{3}	17	13	**20**^{1}	35
21	(Germany) Tom Kalender	17	20	16	15	17	15	13	Ret	13	17	21	Ret	18	11	15	5	25
22	(Germany) Timo Glock	20	Ret	17	10	Ret	DSQ	19	Ret	10	Ret	13	Ret	22	14	Ret	11	22
23	(Switzerland) Fabio Scherer	19	18	Ret	Ret	11	DNS	DNS	Ret	18	19	8	11	14	Ret	17	18	20
24	(Belgium) Nicolas Baert	DSQ	Ret	19	Ret	18	20	Ret	13	17	22	Ret	17	21	19	21	19	3
Pos.	Driver	OSC (Germany)		LAU (Germany)		ZAN (Netherlands)		NOR (Germany)		NÜR (Germany)		SAC (Germany)		RBR (Austria)		HOC (Germany)		Points

Colour	Result
Gold	Winner
Silver	Second place
Bronze	Third place
Green	Points classification
Blue	Non-points classification
Blue	Non-classified finish (NC)
Purple	Retired, not classified (Ret)
Red	Did not qualify (DNQ)
Red	Did not pre-qualify (DNPQ)
Black	Disqualified (DSQ)
White	Did not start (DNS)
White	Withdrew (WD)
White	Race cancelled (C)
Blank	Did not practice (DNP)
Blank	Did not arrive (DNA)
Blank	Excluded (EX)

**Bold** – Pole

Italics – Fastest Lap

1 – 3 Points for Pole

2 – 2 Points for P2

3 – 1 Point for P3

=== 'Rookie of the Year' classification ===
Pos.	Driver	OSC (Germany)		LAU (Germany)		ZAN (Netherlands)		NOR (Germany)		NÜR (Germany)		SAC (Germany)		RBR (Austria)		HOC (Germany)		Points
1	(Netherlands) Morris Schuring	16^{2}	17^{3}	Ret^{2}	11^{3}	5^{1}	11^{3}	14^{5}	12^{5}	Ret^{4}	12^{3}	17^{4}	7^{1}	19^{5}	18^{6}	3^{1}	14^{2}	409
2	(Germany) Ben Dörr	11^{1}	8^{1}	9^{1}	18^{1}	13^{4}	DSQ^{1}	17^{6}	15^{1}	8^{1}	**8**^{1}	19^{3}	DSQ^{2}	13^{2}	16^{3}	20^{3}	15^{4}	394
3	(Germany) Tom Kalender	17^{3}	20^{2}	16^{4}	15^{5}	17^{2}	15^{2}	13^{3}	Ret^{4}	13^{5}	17^{6}	21^{5}	Ret^{5}	18^{6}	11^{2}	15^{5}	5^{3}	355
4	(Belgium) Gilles Magnus	DSQ^{5}	21^{4}	18^{5}	16^{2}	Ret^{3}	19^{4}	12^{2}	Ret^{2}	16^{2}	7^{2}	18^{1}	9^{3}	9^{1}	17^{4}	13^{2}	**20**^{1}	346
5	(Switzerland) Fabio Scherer	19^{4}	18^{5}	Ret^{3}	Ret^{4}	11^{5}	DNS^{5}	DNS^{4}	Ret^{3}	18^{3}	19^{5}	8^{2}	11^{6}	14^{4}	Ret^{1}	17^{6}	18^{6}	258
6	(Belgium) Nicolas Baert	DSQ^{6}	Ret^{6}	19^{6}	Ret^{6}	18^{6}	20^{6}	Ret^{1}	13	17^{6}	22^{4}	Ret^{6}	17^{4}	21^{3}	19^{5}	21^{4}	19^{5}	213
Pos.	Driver	OSC (Germany)		LAU (Germany)		ZAN (Netherlands)		NOR (Germany)		NÜR (Germany)		SAC (Germany)		RBR (Austria)		HOC (Germany)		Points

=== Teams' championship ===
Pos.	Team	Points
1	(Germany) Manthey	392
2	(Germany) Schubert Motorsport	330
3	(United States) Winward Racing	319
4	(Switzerland) Emil Frey Racing	304
5	(Austria) TGI Team Lamborghini by GRT	234
6	(Germany) Landgraf Motorsport	210
7	(Germany) Abt Sportsline	116
8	(Germany) Land-Motorsport	101
9	(Germany) HRT Ford Performance	84
10	(Germany) Dörr Motorsport	69
11	(Germany) Paul Motorsport	40
12	(Belgium) Comtoyou Racing	38

=== Manufacturers' championship ===
Only points scored by the top two drivers of a manufacturer in races count for the manufacturers' championship.

Pos.	Manufacturer	Points
1	(Germany) Mercedes-AMG	418
2	(Germany) Porsche	406
3	(Germany) BMW	348
4	(Italy) Ferrari	329
5	(Italy) Lamborghini	313
6	(United States) Ford	119
7	(Germany) Audi	118
8	(United Kingdom) McLaren	105
9	(United Kingdom) Aston Martin	69

== Bibliography ==
- Runschke, Oliver; Upietz, Tim (18 December 2025). DTM 2025: Das offizielle Jahrbuch der DTM. Duisburg: Gruppe C Motorsport Verlag. ISBN 978-3-948501-45-7.
