= Emil Frey Racing =

Swiss racing team

(Switzerland) Emil Frey Racing
- Founded: 2011
- Nation: Switzerland
- Founder(s): Emil Frey Group
- Base: Safenwil, Switzerland
- Team principal(s): Lorenz Frey
- Current series: GTWC Europe Sprint Cup, DTM, NLS
- Former series: GTWC Europe Endurance Cup, International GT Open, Blancpain GT Series
- Current drivers: (Netherlands) Thierry Vermeulen (Italy) Matteo Cairoli (United Kingdom) Ben Green (Finland) Konsta Lappalainen
- Website: emilfreyracing.com

Emil Frey Racing is a Swiss racing team. Established in 2011, the team debuted with a bespoke Jaguar XK-based GT3 race car in the 2012 Blancpain Endurance Series. After serving as a Lexus factory team from 2015 to 2018, the team switched affiliation to Lamborghini in 2019 and to Ferrari in 2023. The team now competes across multiple European championships with the Ferrari 296 GT3, including DTM and Ferrari Challenge Europe.

== History ==
=== Jaguar XK Emil Frey G3 ===
Jaguar XK Emil Frey G3
- Constructor: (Switzerland) Emil Frey Racing
- Homologation: RACB G3 (G3-105)

Technical specifications
- Chassis: Jaguar XKR-based aluminium space frame
- Engine: Ilmor prepared Jaguar AJ133 5,000 cc (305.1 cu in) V8 front engine
- Transmission: Xtrac 6-speed sequential
- Weight: 1,240 kg (2,733.7 lb)
- Tyres: Pirelli

Competition history
- Competition: Blancpain Endurance Series
- Notable entrants: (Switzerland) Emil Frey Racing
- Debut: Circuit Paul Ricard 2012

Development of the team's first race car was led by Frey and FIA Silver-ranked driver Fredy Barth. Once the design process was complete, chassis manufacturing was delegated to Bemani Motorenbau AG in Beinwil am See. The car completed its first shakedown at Anneau du Rhin in France in early 2012, and the design was eventually homologated as a member of the Royal Automobile Club of Belgium's (RACB) G3 class.

The team and car debuted at the third round of the season at Circuit Paul Ricard. Driven by Frey, Barth, and Gabriel Gardel, the all-Swiss lineup finished 31st overall. The team then failed to finish at both the 24 Hours of Spa and the season finale at Circuito de Navarra.

In an attempt to diagnose and rectify issues with the Jaguar XK, the team appeared at two races of the 2013 Blancpain Endurance Series with an Aston Martin V12 Vantage GT3. The team failed to start the 24 Hours of Spa after a puncture during qualifying and failed to finish at the season finale at the Nürburgring.

The Jaguar XK Emil Frey G3 returned for the 2014 Blancpain Endurance Series with a new power unit tuned by British engineering company Ilmor. The team intended to complete the full season for the first time in 2014, and the revised car was second-fastest in first practice at the season opener at Monza. However, a fire followed by mechanical issues caused retirements at the first two rounds of the season.

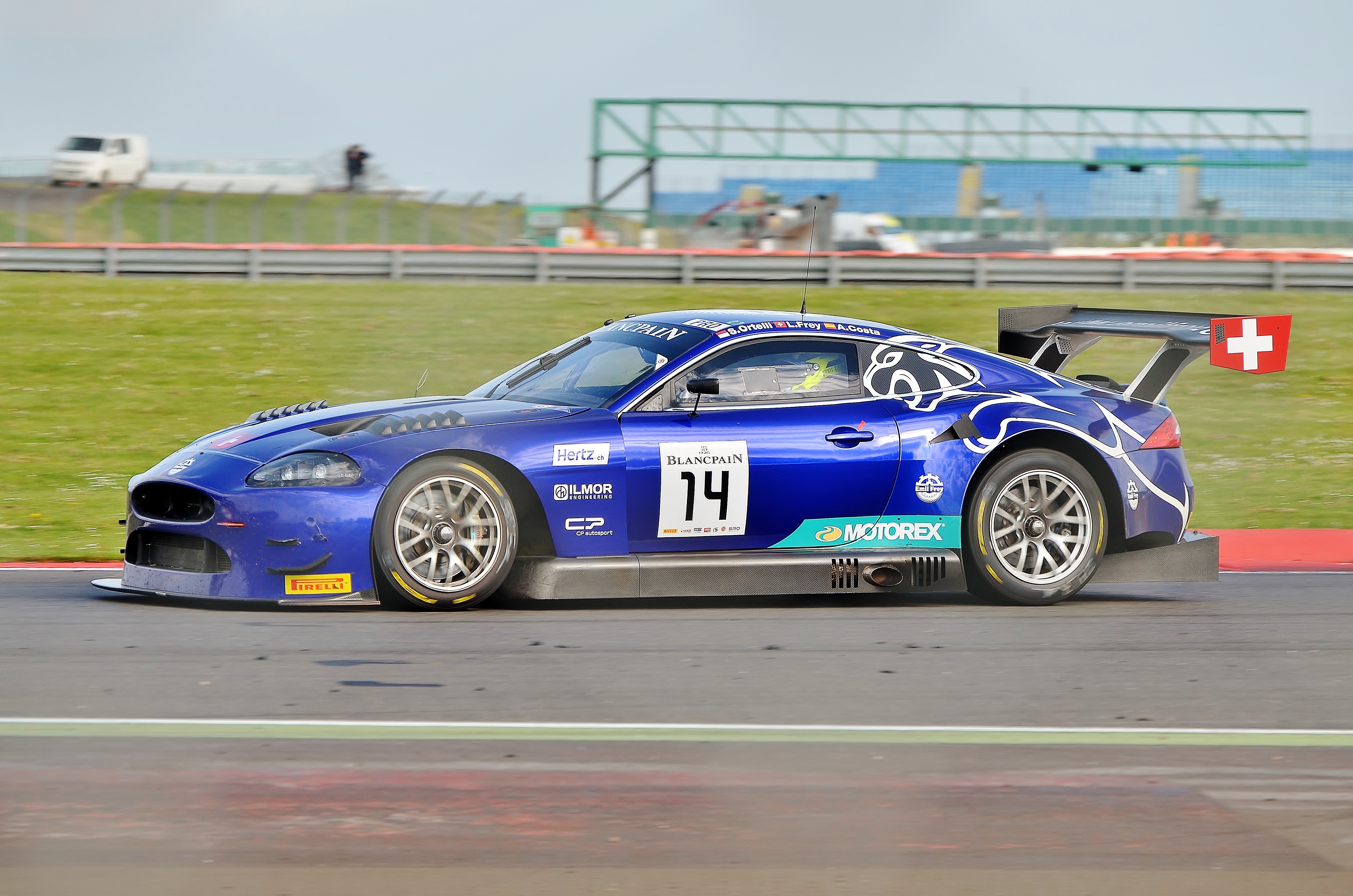
A Jaguar XK Emil Frey G3 at Silverstone Circuit.

Jürg Flach, former operations director at Sauber, joined the team to fulfill the same role for the 2015 season. In 2015, the team achieved a best result of first in class at the season finale at Nürburgring, achieving the team and car's first notable competitive result. In 2016, a new lineup paired Frey with Albert Costa and Stéphane Ortelli.

=== Lexus Factory Team and Expansion ===
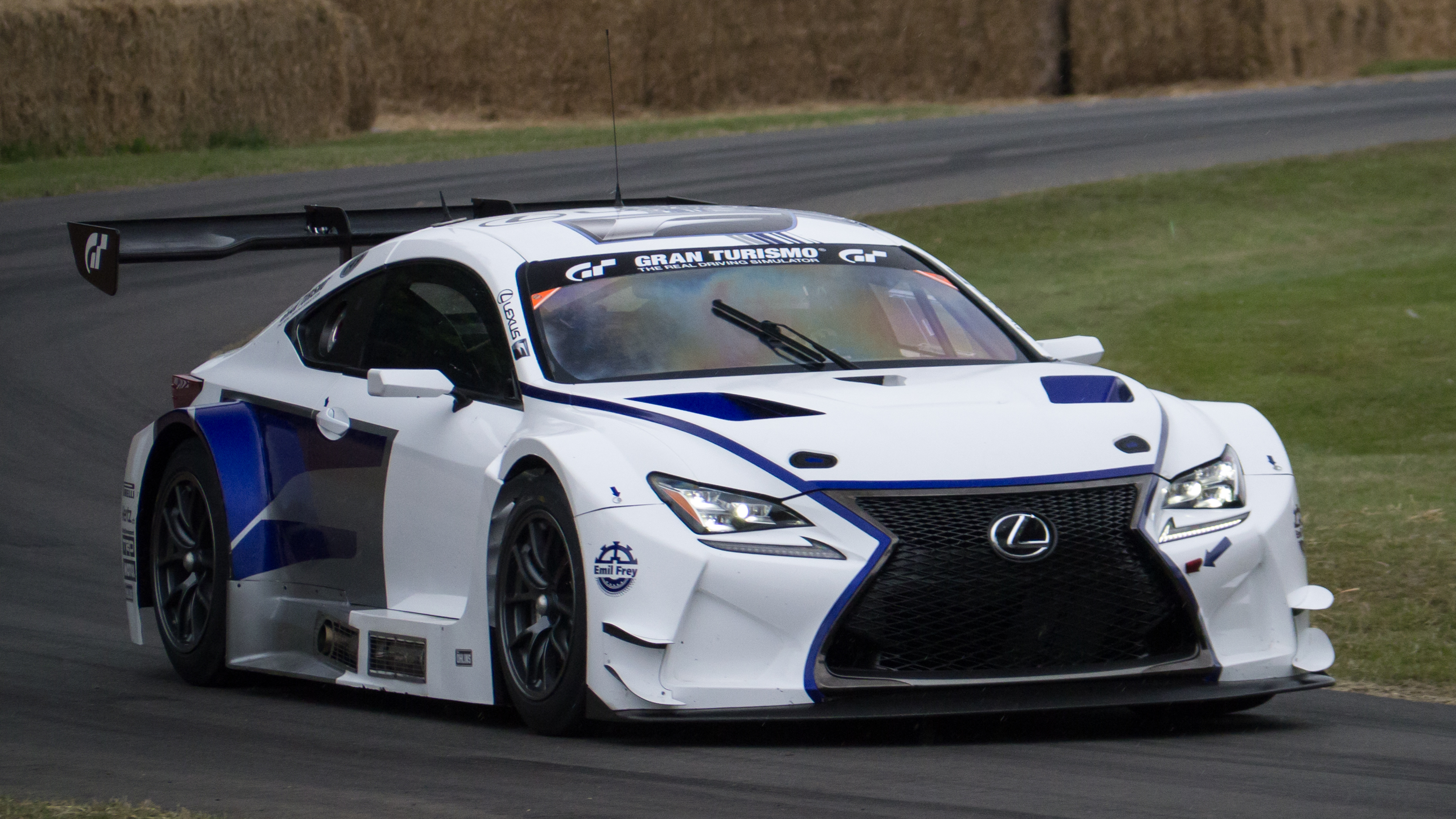
An Emil Frey Racing Lexus RC-F GT3 at the Goodwood Festival of Speed.

In 2014, the team was selected by Lexus to serve as a factory team in support of the new Lexus RC F GT3. Built by Toyota Technocraft in Japan, the team expanded into the VLN Championship to support the new car. The team achieved success immediately, finishing second in class at the car's debut in 2015 with Frey, Jordan Tresson and Markus Oestreich as drivers. The team finished second overall again at the 2015 Opel 6h ADAC Ruhr-Pokal-Rennen. The team returned to VLN in 2016 as a non-homologated car in the SPX class. The team achieved a best result of tenth overall and second in class at the 56. ADAC Reinoldus-Langstreckenrennen at the Nürburgring. In 2017, the team left VLN and entered the International GT Open Championship. New drivers Albert Costa and Philipp Frommenwiler achieved substantial success in the series, winning four races and finishing third in the overall team standings.

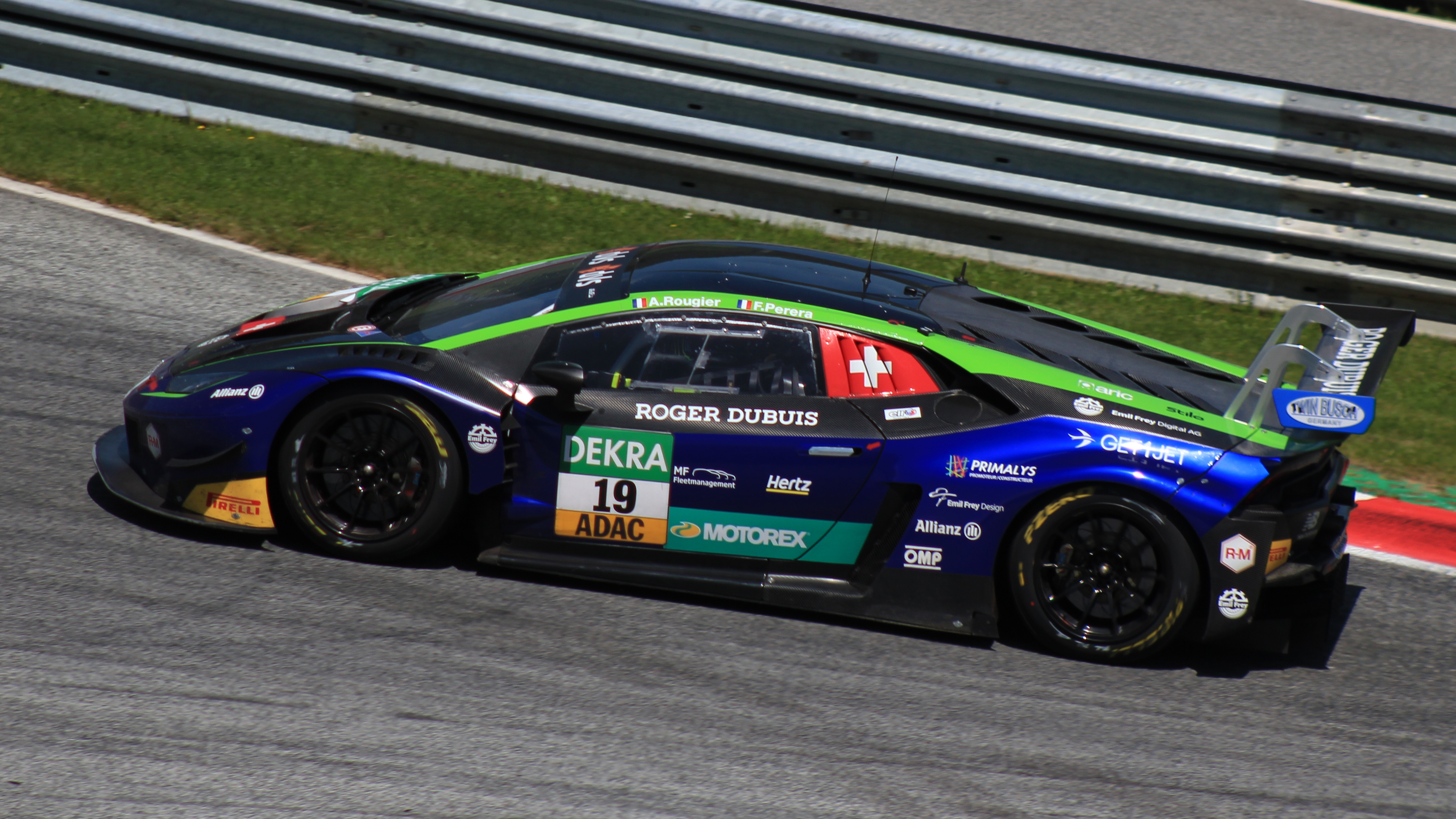
An Emil Frey Racing Lamborghini Huracán at the Red Bull Ring.

=== Lamborghini Affiliation ===
In 2019, Emil Frey's partnership with Lexus ended and the team began a new affiliation with Lamborghini. After being supplied with two Lamborghini Huracán GT3 Evo chassis, the team won the 2019 International GT Open Championship with each car taking four wins apiece. The team moved to the GT World Challenge Europe in 2020, finishing fifth in the Team's Championship with two wins. The team expanded to a three car operation in 2021, achieving multiple wins and the Silver Class Team's Championship.

=== Switch to Ferrari ===
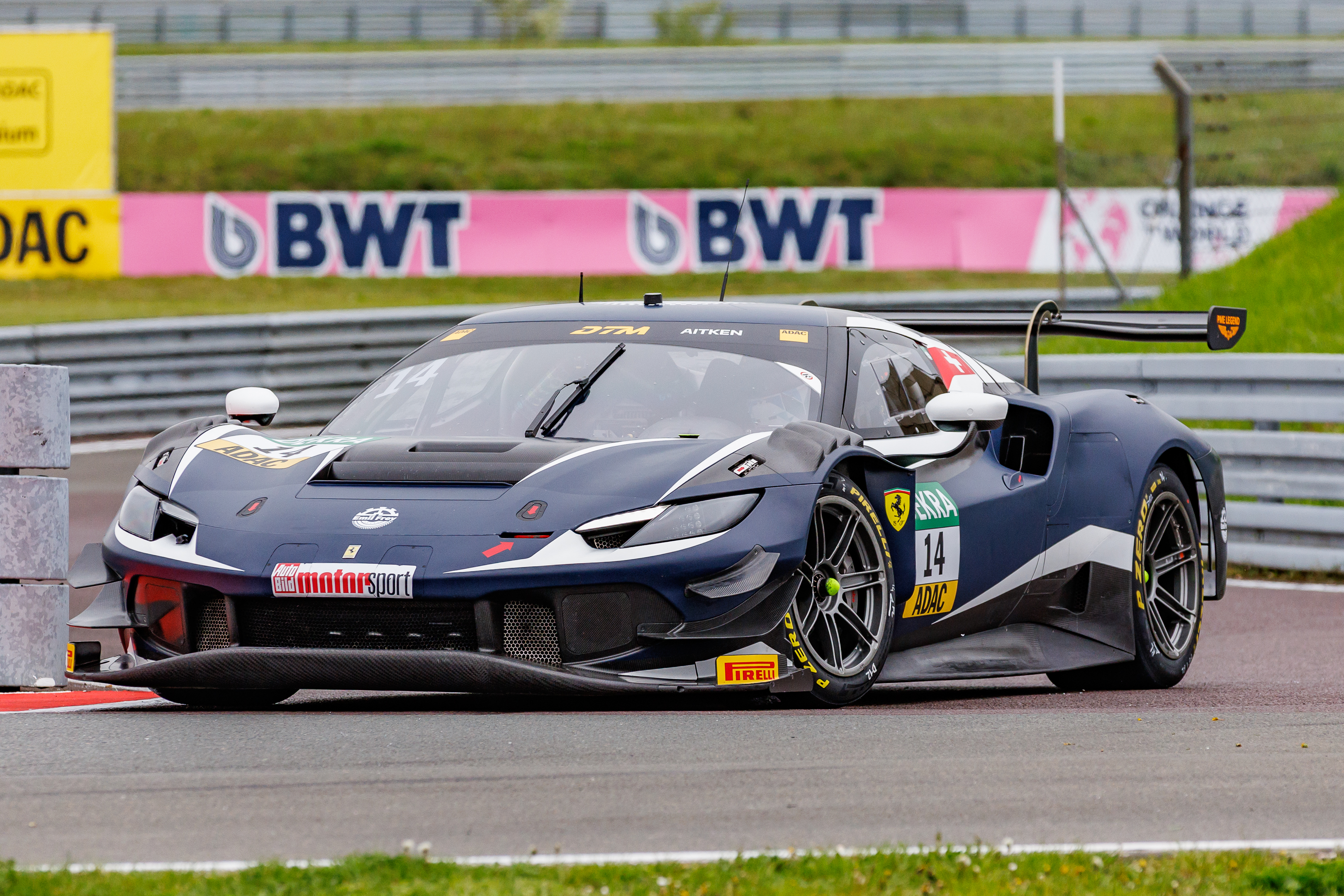
An Emil Frey Racing Ferrari 296 GT3 at Motorsport Arena Oschersleben.

After the 2022 racing season, the team exited its most successful manufacturer affiliation to join Ferrari for the 2023 season. Team representatives stated that the switch was made "purely on marketing" after the Emil Frey Group secured a contract to operate a new Ferrari dealership in Munich.

== Race results ==
=== Blancpain Endurance Series ===
(key) (Races in bold indicate pole position) (Races in italics indicate fastest lap)

Blancpain Endurance Series
Year	Car	No.	Drivers	1	2	3	4	5	6	Pos.	Pts
2012	Jaguar XK Emil Frey G3	80	(Switzerland) Fredy Barth	MON	SIL; DNS	LEC; 31	SPA; DNS	NÜR	NAV; Ret	-	-
2012	Jaguar XK Emil Frey G3	80	(Switzerland) Gabriele Gardel	MON	SIL; DNS	LEC; 31	SPA; DNS	NÜR	NAV; Ret	-	-
2012	Jaguar XK Emil Frey G3	80	(Switzerland) Lorenz Frey	MON	SIL; DNS	LEC; 31	SPA; DNS	NÜR	NAV; Ret	-	-
2013	Aston Martin V12 Vantage GT3	80	(Switzerland) Fredy Barth	MON; 28	SIL	LEC	SPA			-	-
2013	Jaguar XK Emil Frey G3	80	(Switzerland) Gabriele Gardel	MON; 28	SIL	LEC	SPA	NÜR; Ret		-	-
2013	Jaguar XK Emil Frey G3	80	(Switzerland) Lorenz Frey	MON; 28	SIL	LEC	SPA	NÜR; Ret		-	-
2014	Jaguar XK Emil Frey G3	14	(Switzerland) Lorenz Frey	MON; 28	SIL; Ret	LEC; 32	SPA; Ret			10th	6
2014	Jaguar XK Emil Frey G3	14	(Switzerland) Fredy Barth	MON; 28	SIL; Ret	LEC; 32	SPA; Ret	NÜR; 19		10th	6
2014	Jaguar XK Emil Frey G3	14	(Switzerland) Gabriele Gardel	MON; 28	SIL; Ret	LEC; 32	SPA; Ret	NÜR; 19		10th	6
2014	Jaguar XK Emil Frey G3	14	(Switzerland) Jonathan Hirschi				SPA; Ret	NÜR; 19		10th	6
2015	Jaguar XK Emil Frey G3	14	(Switzerland) Lorenz Frey	MON; Ret	SIL; 16	LEC; 43	SPA; 27	NÜR; 16		8th	51
2015	Jaguar XK Emil Frey G3	14	(Switzerland) Fredy Barth	MON; Ret	SIL; 16	LEC; 43	SPA; 27	NÜR; 16		8th	51
2015	Jaguar XK Emil Frey G3	14	(Switzerland) Gabriele Gardel	MON; Ret	SIL; 16	LEC; 43	SPA; 27	NÜR; 16		8th	51
2015	Jaguar XK Emil Frey G3	14	(Switzerland) Jonathan Hirschi				SPA; 27			8th	51
2016	Jaguar XK Emil Frey G3	14	(Spain) Albert Costa	MON; 20	SIL; 43	LEC; 42	SPA; 53	NÜR; Ret		18th	8
2016	Jaguar XK Emil Frey G3	14	(Switzerland) Lorenz Frey	MON; 20	SIL; 43	LEC; 42	SPA; 53	NÜR; Ret		18th	8
2016	Jaguar XK Emil Frey G3	14	(Monaco) Stéphane Ortelli	MON; 20	SIL; 43	LEC; 42	SPA; 53	NÜR; Ret		18th	8
2016	Jaguar XK Emil Frey G3	114	(Finland) Markus Palttala	MON	SIL	LEC	SPA; 49			18th	8
2016	Jaguar XK Emil Frey G3	114	(Switzerland) Jonathan Hirschi	MON	SIL	LEC	SPA; 49	NÜR; 7		18th	8
2016	Jaguar XK Emil Frey G3	114	(Austria) Christian Klien	MON	SIL	LEC	SPA; 49	NÜR; 7		18th	8
2016	Jaguar XK Emil Frey G3	114	(Austria) Norbert Siedler					NÜR; 7		18th	8
2017	Jaguar XK Emil Frey G3	14	(Spain) Albert Costa	MON; 31	SIL; 10	LEC; 55	SPA; Ret			16th	6
2017	Jaguar XK Emil Frey G3	14	(Switzerland) Lorenz Frey	MON; 31	SIL; 10	LEC; 55	SPA; Ret			16th	6
2017	Jaguar XK Emil Frey G3	14	(Monaco) Stéphane Ortelli	MON; 31	SIL; 10	LEC; 55	SPA; Ret	NÜR; 11		16th	6
2017	Jaguar XK Emil Frey G3	14	(Austria) Norbert Siedler					NÜR; 11		16th	6
2017	Jaguar XK Emil Frey G3	114	(Switzerland) Jonathan Hirschi	MON; Ret	SIL; 12	LEC; 34	SPA; Ret	NÜR; 10		16th	6
2017	Jaguar XK Emil Frey G3	114	(Germany) Marco Seefried	MON; Ret	SIL; 12	LEC; 34	SPA; Ret	NÜR; 10		16th	6
2017	Jaguar XK Emil Frey G3	114	(Austria) Christian Klien	MON; Ret	SIL; 12	LEC; 34	SPA; Ret	NÜR; 10		16th	6

=== Veranstaltergemeinschaft Langstreckenpokal Nürburgring (VLN) ===
Veranstaltergemeinschaft Langstreckenpokal Nürburgring
Year	Car	No.	Drivers	1	2	3	4	5	6	7	8	9	10	Pos.	Pts
2015	Lexus RC F GT3	54	(Switzerland) Lorenz Frey	NÜR	NÜR	NÜR	NÜR; 11	NÜR	NÜR	NÜR; 13	NÜR; Ret	NÜR	NÜR	-	-
2015	Lexus RC F GT3	54	(Germany) Markus Oestreich	NÜR	NÜR	NÜR	NÜR; 11	NÜR	NÜR	NÜR; 13	NÜR; Ret	NÜR	NÜR	-	-
2015	Lexus RC F GT3	54	(France) Jordan Tresson	NÜR	NÜR	NÜR	NÜR; 11	NÜR	NÜR	NÜR; 13	NÜR; Ret	NÜR	NÜR	-	-
2016	Lexus RC F GT3	54	(Switzerland) Lorenz Frey	NÜR	NÜR	NÜR	NÜR	NÜR; 10	NÜR; Ret	NÜR	NÜR	NÜR	NÜR	-	-
2016	Lexus RC F GT3	54	(Monaco) Stéphane Ortelli	NÜR	NÜR	NÜR	NÜR	NÜR; 10	NÜR; Ret	NÜR	NÜR	NÜR	NÜR	-	-

=== International GT Open ===
International GT Open
Year	Car	No.	Drivers	1	2	3	4	5	6	7	8	9	10	11	12	13	14	Pos.	Pts
2017	Lexus RC F GT3	54	(Spain) Albert Costa	EST; 1	EST; 5	SPA; 1	SPA; 7	LEC; 3	LEC; 6	HUN; 3	HUN; Ret	SIL; 1	SIL; 3	MON; 8	MON; 5	BAR; Ret	BAR; 1	3rd	57
2017	Lexus RC F GT3	54	(Switzerland) Philipp Frommenwiler	EST; 1	EST; 5	SPA; 1	SPA; 7	LEC; 3	LEC; 6	HUN; 3	HUN; Ret	SIL; 1	SIL; 3	MON; 8	MON; 5	BAR; Ret	BAR; 1	3rd	57

=== Deutsche Tourenwagen Masters ===
Year	Car	Drivers	Races	Wins	Poles	F/Laps	Podiums	Points	D.C.	T.C.
2023	Ferrari 296 GT3	(United Kingdom) Jack Aitken	14	1	1	1	2	82	14th	7th
2023	Ferrari 296 GT3	(Netherlands) Thierry Vermeulen	16	0	0	0	0	58	16th	7th
2023	Ferrari 296 GT3	(Spain) Albert Costa	2	0	0	0	0	8	28th	7th
2024	Ferrari 296 GT3	(United Kingdom) Jack Aitken	16	3	4	0	3	128	8th	7th
2024	Ferrari 296 GT3	(Netherlands) Thierry Vermeulen	16	0	1	2	1	71	15th	7th
2025	Ferrari 296 GT3	(United Kingdom) Jack Aitken	16	2	3	3	4	162	8th	4th
2025	Ferrari 296 GT3	(Netherlands) Thierry Vermeulen	16	0	2	0	3	102	10th	4th
2025	Ferrari 296 GT3	(United Kingdom) Ben Green	16	0	1	0	2	79	13th	4th
2026	Ferrari 296 GT3 Evo	(Italy) Matteo Cairoli	16	3	2	1	3	160	5th	4th
2026	Ferrari 296 GT3 Evo	(Netherlands) Thierry Vermeulen	16	0	0	0	1	107	10th	4th
