= 2024 Deutsche Tourenwagen Masters =

Car racing championship

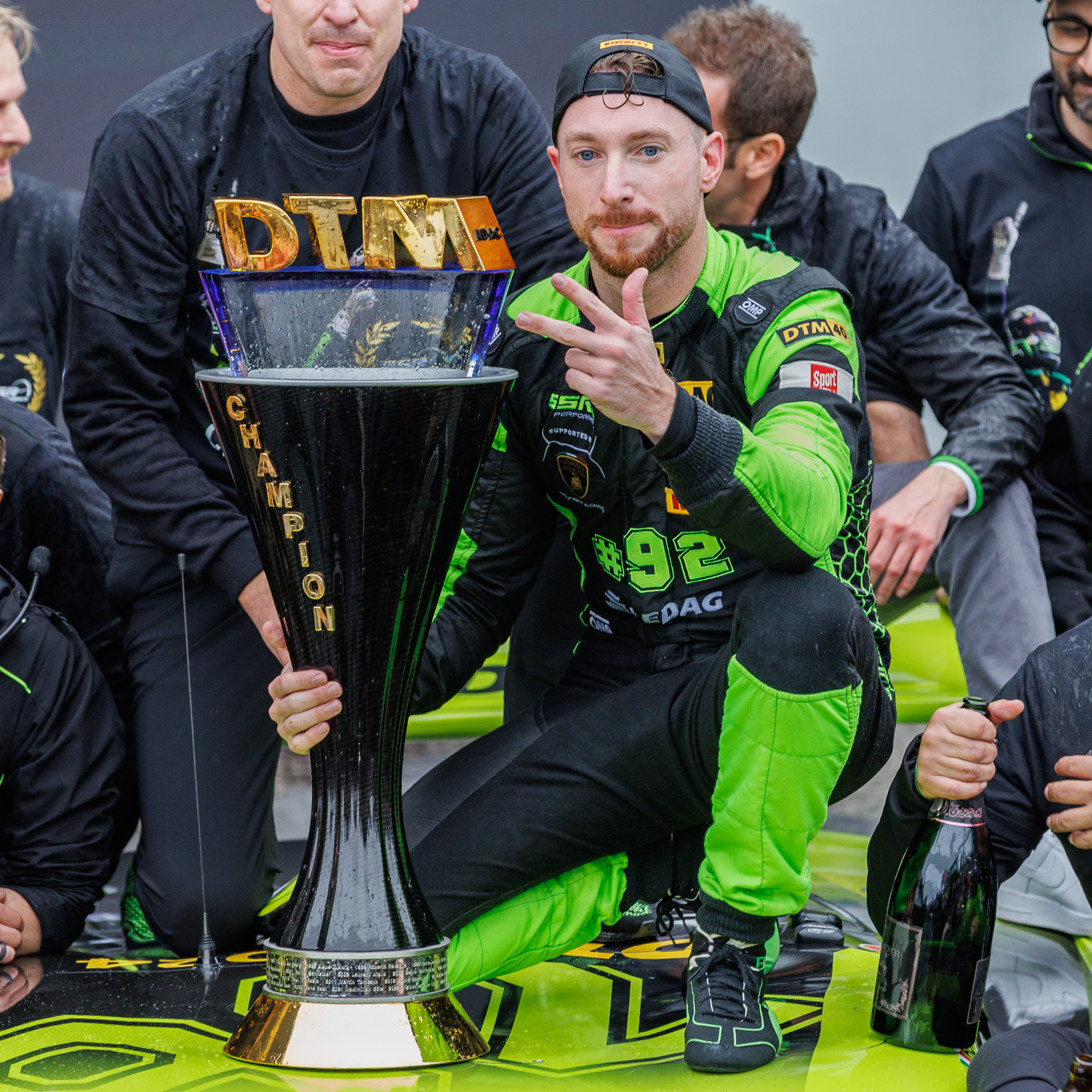
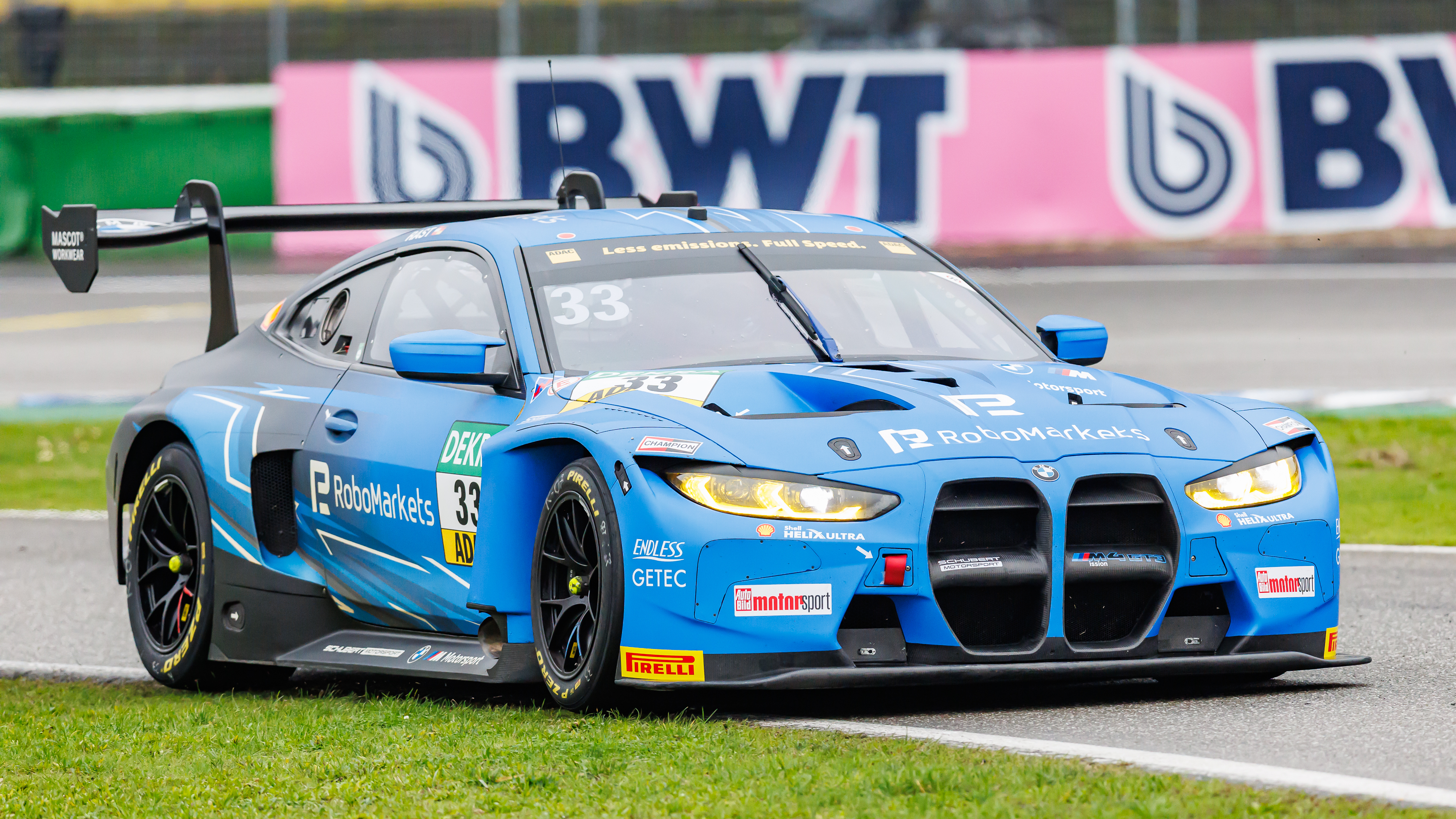
Mirko Bortolotti (left) was the driver's champion, while Schubert Motorsport (right) was the teams' champion

The 2024 Deutsche Tourenwagen Masters was the thirty-eighth season of the premier German touring car championship and also the twenty-fifth season under the moniker of Deutsche Tourenwagen Masters since the series' resumption in 2000. It's the fourth season of the DTM to be run under Group GT3 regulations, and the second under ADAC's promotion.

== Teams and drivers ==
All teams competed with tyres supplied by Pirelli.

Manufacturer	Car	Engine	Team	No.	Driver	Status	Rounds	Ref.
Audi	Audi R8 LMS Evo II	Audi DAR 5.2 L V10	(Germany) Abt Sportsline	3	(South Africa) Kelvin van der Linde		All	
Audi	Audi R8 LMS Evo II	Audi DAR 5.2 L V10	(Germany) Abt Sportsline	7	(Switzerland) Ricardo Feller		All	
BMW	BMW M4 GT3	BMW P58 3.0 L Twin Turbo I6	(Germany) Schubert Motorsport	11	(Germany) Marco Wittmann		All	
BMW	BMW M4 GT3	BMW P58 3.0 L Twin Turbo I6	(Germany) Schubert Motorsport	31	(South Africa) Sheldon van der Linde		All	
BMW	BMW M4 GT3	BMW P58 3.0 L Twin Turbo I6	(Germany) Schubert Motorsport	33	(Germany) René Rast		All	
Ferrari	Ferrari 296 GT3	Ferrari F163CE 3.0 L Twin Turbo V6	(Switzerland) Emil Frey Racing	14	(United Kingdom) Jack Aitken		All	
Ferrari	Ferrari 296 GT3	Ferrari F163CE 3.0 L Twin Turbo V6	(Switzerland) Emil Frey Racing	69	(Netherlands) Thierry Vermeulen		All	
Lamborghini	Lamborghini Huracán GT3 Evo 2	Lamborghini DGF 5.2 L V10	(Austria) / Lamborghini Team Liqui Moly by GRT (Note: Car No. 19 entered as Lamborghini Team Liqui Moly by GRT, car No. 63 entered as Lamborghini Team TGI by GRT. Both cars share a teams' championship entry as "GRT Grasser Racing Team".); (Austria) / Lamborghini Team TGI by GRT	19	(Germany) Luca Engstler		All	
Lamborghini	Lamborghini Huracán GT3 Evo 2	Lamborghini DGF 5.2 L V10	(Austria) / Lamborghini Team Liqui Moly by GRT; (Austria) / Lamborghini Team TGI by GRT	63	(Germany) Christian Engelhart		1–3	
Lamborghini	Lamborghini Huracán GT3 Evo 2	Lamborghini DGF 5.2 L V10	(Austria) / Lamborghini Team Liqui Moly by GRT; (Austria) / Lamborghini Team TGI by GRT	63	(France) Franck Perera		4–5, 7–8	
Lamborghini	Lamborghini Huracán GT3 Evo 2	Lamborghini DGF 5.2 L V10	(Austria) / Lamborghini Team Liqui Moly by GRT; (Austria) / Lamborghini Team TGI by GRT	63	(South Africa) Jordan Pepper		6	
Lamborghini	Lamborghini Huracán GT3 Evo 2	Lamborghini DGF 5.2 L V10	(Germany) Paul Motorsport	71	(Germany) Maximilian Paul		All	
Lamborghini	Lamborghini Huracán GT3 Evo 2	Lamborghini DGF 5.2 L V10	(Germany) SSR Performance	92	(Italy) Mirko Bortolotti		All	
Lamborghini	Lamborghini Huracán GT3 Evo 2	Lamborghini DGF 5.2 L V10	(Germany) SSR Performance	94	(Denmark) Nicki Thiim		All	
McLaren	McLaren 720S GT3 Evo	McLaren M840T 4.0 L Twin Turbo V8	(Germany) Dörr Motorsport	25	(Germany) Ben Dörr		All	
McLaren	McLaren 720S GT3 Evo	McLaren M840T 4.0 L Twin Turbo V8	(Germany) Dörr Motorsport	85	(Austria) Clemens Schmid		All	
Mercedes-AMG	Mercedes-AMG GT3 Evo	Mercedes-AMG M159 6.2 L V8	(Germany) Mercedes-AMG Team HRT	4	(Germany) Luca Stolz		1–7	
Mercedes-AMG	Mercedes-AMG GT3 Evo	Mercedes-AMG M159 6.2 L V8	(Germany) Mercedes-AMG Team HRT	4	(Andorra) Jules Gounon		8	
Mercedes-AMG	Mercedes-AMG GT3 Evo	Mercedes-AMG M159 6.2 L V8	(Germany) Mercedes-AMG Team HRT	36	(India) Arjun Maini		All	
Mercedes-AMG	Mercedes-AMG GT3 Evo	Mercedes-AMG M159 6.2 L V8	(United States) / Mercedes-AMG Team Mann-Filter (Note: Car No. 22 entered as Mercedes-AMG Team Mann-Filter, car No. 130 entered as Mercedes-AMG Team Winward. Both cars share a teams' championship entry as "Winward Racing".); (United States) / Mercedes-AMG Team Winward	22	(Austria) Lucas Auer		All	
Mercedes-AMG	Mercedes-AMG GT3 Evo	Mercedes-AMG M159 6.2 L V8	(United States) / Mercedes-AMG Team Mann-Filter; (United States) / Mercedes-AMG Team Winward	130	(Germany) Maro Engel		All	
Porsche	Porsche 911 GT3 R (992)	Porsche M97/80 4.2 L Flat-6	(Germany) Manthey EMA	90	(Turkey) Ayhancan Güven		All	
Porsche	Porsche 911 GT3 R (992)	Porsche M97/80 4.2 L Flat-6	(Germany) Manthey EMA	91	(Austria) Thomas Preining		All	

Icon	Status
G	Guest drivers ineligible for points

=== Driver and team changes ===
- Maximilian Paul returned to the series with a privately entered Lamborghini, having last competed as a replacement driver at GRT Grasser Racing Team.
- GRT Grasser Racing Team entered a completely new line-up, fielding a pair of cars for Christian Engelhart, who drove for them in the 2023 season finale, and Luca Engstler, who switched from Engstler Motorsport.
- SSR Performance scaled down to two cars. Alessio Deledda left the team to compete in International GT Open with Oregon Team, while Franck Perera left to compete in the FIA World Endurance Championship with Iron Lynx. Nicki Thiim, who last competed in European Le Mans Series with GMB Motorsport, was signed as their replacement.
- Dörr Motorsport entered the series, fielding a pair of McLaren 720S GT3 Evos. Clemens Schmid switched from GRT Grasser Racing Team to join them, with Ben Dörr named as the second driver.
- Project 1 left the series, with Sandro Holzem joining Land Motorsport to compete in ADAC GT Masters. Second driver Marco Wittmann switched to Schubert Motorsport, with the team expanding to three cars as a result.
- Porsche teams Toksport WRT and KÜS Team Bernhard left the series. Their drivers Laurin Heinrich, Marvin Dienst and Tim Heinemann left the series to compete in IMSA, GT World Challenge Europe Endurance Cup and Nürburgring Langstrecken-Serie respectively. Ayhancan Güven moved KÜS Team Bernhard to Manthey EMA to replace Dennis Olsen, who joined Proton Competition in WEC instead.
- Tresor Attempto Racing left the series, with both drivers Mattia Drudi and Patric Niederhauser moving to the GT World Challenge Europe Endurance Cup.
- Mercedes-AMG Team Landgraf left the series, having fielded two cars in 2023 under Team Mann-Filter and Team BWT. Jusuf Owega left the series to compete in GT World Challenge Europe Endurance Cup. Maro Engel switched to Winward Racing to replace ADAC GT Masters-bound David Schumacher, with the American team entering his car as Mercedes-AMG Team Winward and Lucas Auer’s car under Mercedes-AMG Team Mann-Filter.

== Race calendar ==
Round	Circuit	Location	Race 1	Race 2
1	(Germany) Motorsport Arena Oschersleben	Oschersleben, Saxony-Anhalt	27 April	28 April
2	(Germany) Lausitzring	Klettwitz, Brandenburg	25 May	26 May
3	(Netherlands) Circuit Zandvoort	Zandvoort, North Holland	8 June	9 June
4	(Germany) Norisring	Nuremberg, Bavaria	6 July	7 July
5	(Germany) Nürburgring	Nürburg, Rhineland-Palatinate	17 August	18 August
6	(Germany) Sachsenring	Hohenstein-Ernstthal, Sachsen	7 September	8 September
7	(Austria) Red Bull Ring	Spielberg, Styria	28 September	29 September
8	(Germany) Hockenheimring	Hockenheim, Baden-Württemberg	19 October	20 October

== Results and standings ==
=== Season summary ===
Round		Circuit	Pole position	Fastest lap	Winning driver	Winning team	Winning manufacturer
1	R1	(Germany) Motorsport Arena Oschersleben	(United Kingdom) Jack Aitken	(Switzerland) Ricardo Feller	(United Kingdom) Jack Aitken	(Switzerland) Emil Frey Racing	(Italy) Ferrari
1	R2	(Germany) Motorsport Arena Oschersleben	(Italy) Mirko Bortolotti	(Germany) Maro Engel	(Germany) Luca Engstler	(Austria) Lamborghini Team Liqui Moly by GRT	(Italy) Lamborghini
2	R1	(Germany) Lausitzring (Sprint Circuit)	(South Africa) Kelvin van der Linde	(South Africa) Kelvin van der Linde	(South Africa) Kelvin van der Linde	(Germany) Abt Sportsline	(Germany) Audi
2	R2	(Germany) Lausitzring (Sprint Circuit)	(Austria) Thomas Preining	(South Africa) Kelvin van der Linde	(Austria) Thomas Preining	(Germany) Manthey EMA	(Germany) Porsche
3	R1	(Netherlands) Circuit Zandvoort	(United Kingdom) Jack Aitken	(Germany) Ben Dörr	(United Kingdom) Jack Aitken	(Switzerland) Emil Frey Racing	(Italy) Ferrari
3	R2	(Netherlands) Circuit Zandvoort	(Germany) Maximilian Paul	(Denmark) Nicki Thiim	(Germany) Marco Wittmann	(Germany) Schubert Motorsport	(Germany) BMW
4	R1	(Germany) Norisring	(United Kingdom) Jack Aitken	(Germany) Maximilian Paul	(Germany) René Rast	(Germany) Schubert Motorsport	(Germany) BMW
4	R2	(Germany) Norisring	(Denmark) Nicki Thiim	(Denmark) Nicki Thiim	(Denmark) Nicki Thiim	(Germany) SSR Performance	(Italy) Lamborghini
5	R1	(Germany) Nürburgring (Sprint Circuit)	(South Africa) Kelvin van der Linde	(South Africa) Kelvin van der Linde	(South Africa) Kelvin van der Linde	(Germany) Abt Sportsline	(Germany) Audi
5	R2	(Germany) Nürburgring (Sprint Circuit)	(Germany) Maro Engel	(Turkey) Ayhancan Güven	(South Africa) Sheldon van der Linde	(Germany) Schubert Motorsport	(Germany) BMW
6	R1	(Germany) Sachsenring	(United Kingdom) Jack Aitken (Note: Thomas Preining recorded the fastest time in qualifying and received the three bonus points, but had to serve a five-place grid penalty for collecting three reprimands since the start of the season. Jack Aitken, who recorded the second fastest time, was promoted to pole position.)	(Netherlands) Thierry Vermeulen	(United Kingdom) Jack Aitken	(Switzerland) Emil Frey Racing	(Italy) Ferrari
6	R2	(Germany) Sachsenring	(Netherlands) Thierry Vermeulen	(Netherlands) Thierry Vermeulen	(Germany) Luca Stolz	(Germany) Mercedes-AMG Team HRT	(Germany) Mercedes-AMG
7	R1	(Austria) Red Bull Ring	(India) Arjun Maini	(Germany) Maro Engel	(Italy) Mirko Bortolotti	(Germany) SSR Performance	(Italy) Lamborghini
7	R2	(Austria) Red Bull Ring	(Italy) Mirko Bortolotti	(Austria) Thomas Preining	(Germany) René Rast	(Germany) Schubert Motorsport	(Germany) BMW
8	R1	(Germany) Hockenheimring	(South Africa) Kelvin van der Linde	(Andorra) Jules Gounon	(South Africa) Kelvin van der Linde	(Germany) Abt Sportsline	(Germany) Audi
8	R2	(Germany) Hockenheimring	(Italy) Mirko Bortolotti	(Germany) Luca Engstler	(Germany) Luca Engstler	(Austria) Lamborghini Team Liqui Moly by GRT	(Italy) Lamborghini

=== Scoring system ===
Points were awarded to the top fifteen classified finishers as follows:

Position	**1st**	**2nd**	**3rd**	**4th**	**5th**	**6th**	**7th**	**8th**	**9th**	**10th**	**11th**	**12th**	**13th**	**14th**	**15th**
Race	25	20	16	13	11	10	9	8	7	6	5	4	3	2	1

Additionally, the top three placed drivers in qualifying also received points:

Qualifying Position	**1st**	**2nd**	**3rd**
Points	3	2	1

=== Drivers' championship ===
Pos.	Driver	OSC (Germany)		LAU (Germany)		ZAN (Netherlands)		NOR (Germany)		NÜR (Germany)		SAC (Germany)		RBR (Austria)		HOC (Germany)		Points
1	(Italy) Mirko Bortolotti	2^{2}	**15**^{1}	11	4^{3}	9	2^{2}	5^{3}	3^{2}	2^{2}	9	2^{3}	7	1	**4**^{1}	5	**2**^{1}	238
2	(South Africa) Kelvin van der Linde	12	5	**1**^{1}	2	13	3	6	9	**1**^{1}	4	8	2^{2}	8	5	**1**^{1}	12	221
3	(Germany) Maro Engel	13	2	2	7	11	13	8	2^{3}	3	**2**^{1}	3	5	2^{3}	8	4	10	203
4	(Germany) René Rast	7	7	Ret	6	2	7	1	5	11	17	7	9	9	1^{3}	7	3	172
5	(Austria) Thomas Preining	10	13	3^{2}	**1**^{1}	14	10	14	6	7	7	6^{1}	4	12	2	14	4	158
6	(South Africa) Sheldon van der Linde	4	6	6	8	6	8	7^{2}	14	13	1	9	8	11	6	11	9	142
7	(India) Arjun Maini	8^{3}	4	7	12	3^{3}	6	15	4	10	Ret	5	Ret	**3**^{1}	3	8	13	139
8	(United Kingdom) Jack Aitken	**1**^{1}	Ret^{3}	16	14	**1**^{1}	16	**9**^{1}	18	5	13	**1**^{2}	6	14	10	Ret	16	128
9	(Germany) Luca Stolz	5	3^{2}	10	DSQ	10	5	11	7	12	11	4	1^{3}	4	Ret			127
10	(Austria) Lucas Auer	6	11	4	10	5	Ret	Ret	10	4^{3}	12	12	12	7	Ret	2^{2}	8	116
11	(Switzerland) Ricardo Feller	3	9	5^{3}	3^{2}	8	11	13	12	9	8^{2}	Ret	Ret	10	12	12	6^{3}	115
12	(Germany) Marco Wittmann	18	10	13	9	7	1	12	11	6	3^{3}	13	DSQ	Ret	11	9	7	110
13	(Denmark) Nicki Thiim	Ret	Ret	8	Ret	12	14	4	**1**^{1}	8	Ret	14	10	13	16	10	5^{2}	93
14	(Germany) Luca Engstler	11	1	14	5	Ret	12	3	19	18	15	Ret	Ret	18	Ret^{2}	15	1	92
15	(Netherlands) Thierry Vermeulen	9	Ret	17	13	15	4^{3}	17	15	16	6	11	**3**^{1}	DSQ	13	13	11	71
16	(Turkey) Ayhancan Güven	14	14	15	11	17	Ret	16	8	17	5	DSQ	13	5	7	3^{3}	19	69
17	(France) Franck Perera							2	13	14	10			16	9	Ret	15	39
18	(Germany) Maximilian Paul	17	DSQ	12	Ret	Ret	**9**^{1}	10	Ret	15	16	15	Ret	6^{2}	14	16	14	38
19	(Austria) Clemens Schmid	15	12	19	Ret	4^{2}	Ret	18	17	20	DNS	Ret	11	15	15	17	17	27
20	(Germany) Christian Engelhart	16	8	9	16	Ret	Ret											15
21	(Andorra) Jules Gounon															6	Ret	10
22	(South Africa) Jordan Pepper											10	Ret					6
23	(Germany) Ben Dörr	Ret	16	18	15	16	15	Ret	16	19	14	16	Ret	17	17	18	18	4
Pos.	Driver	OSC (Germany)		LAU (Germany)		ZAN (Netherlands)		NOR (Germany)		NÜR (Germany)		SAC (Germany)		RBR (Austria)		HOC (Germany)		Points

Colour	Result
Gold	Winner
Silver	Second place
Bronze	Third place
Green	Points classification
Blue	Non-points classification
Blue	Non-classified finish (NC)
Purple	Retired, not classified (Ret)
Red	Did not qualify (DNQ)
Red	Did not pre-qualify (DNPQ)
Black	Disqualified (DSQ)
White	Did not start (DNS)
White	Withdrew (WD)
White	Race cancelled (C)
Blank	Did not practice (DNP)
Blank	Did not arrive (DNA)
Blank	Excluded (EX)

**Bold** – Pole

Italics – Fastest Lap

1 – 3 Points for Pole

2 – 2 Points for P2

3 – 1 Point for P3

=== Teams' championship ===
Pos.	Team	Points
1	(Germany) Schubert Motorsport	361
2	(Germany) Abt Sportsline	326
3	(United States) Winward Racing	316
4	(Germany) SSR Performance	312
5	(Germany) Mercedes-AMG Team HRT	272
6	(Germany) Manthey EMA	226
7	(Switzerland) Emil Frey Racing	193
8	(Austria) GRT Grasser Racing Team	155
9	(Germany) Paul Motorsport	39
10	(Germany) Dörr Motorsport	37

=== Manufacturers' championship ===
Only points scored by the top two drivers of a manufacturer in races count for the manufacturers' championship.

Pos.	Manufacturer	Points
1	(Germany) Mercedes-AMG	434
2	(Italy) Lamborghini	424
3	(Germany) BMW	382
4	(Germany) Audi	350
5	(Germany) Porsche	264
6	(Italy) Ferrari	237
7	(United Kingdom) McLaren	97

== Bibliography ==
- Runschke, Oliver; Upietz, Tim (19 December 2024). DTM 2024: Das offizielle Jahrbuch der DTM. Duisburg: Gruppe C Motorsport Verlag. ISBN 978-3-948501-34-1.
