= Jordan Pepper =

South African race driver (born 1996)

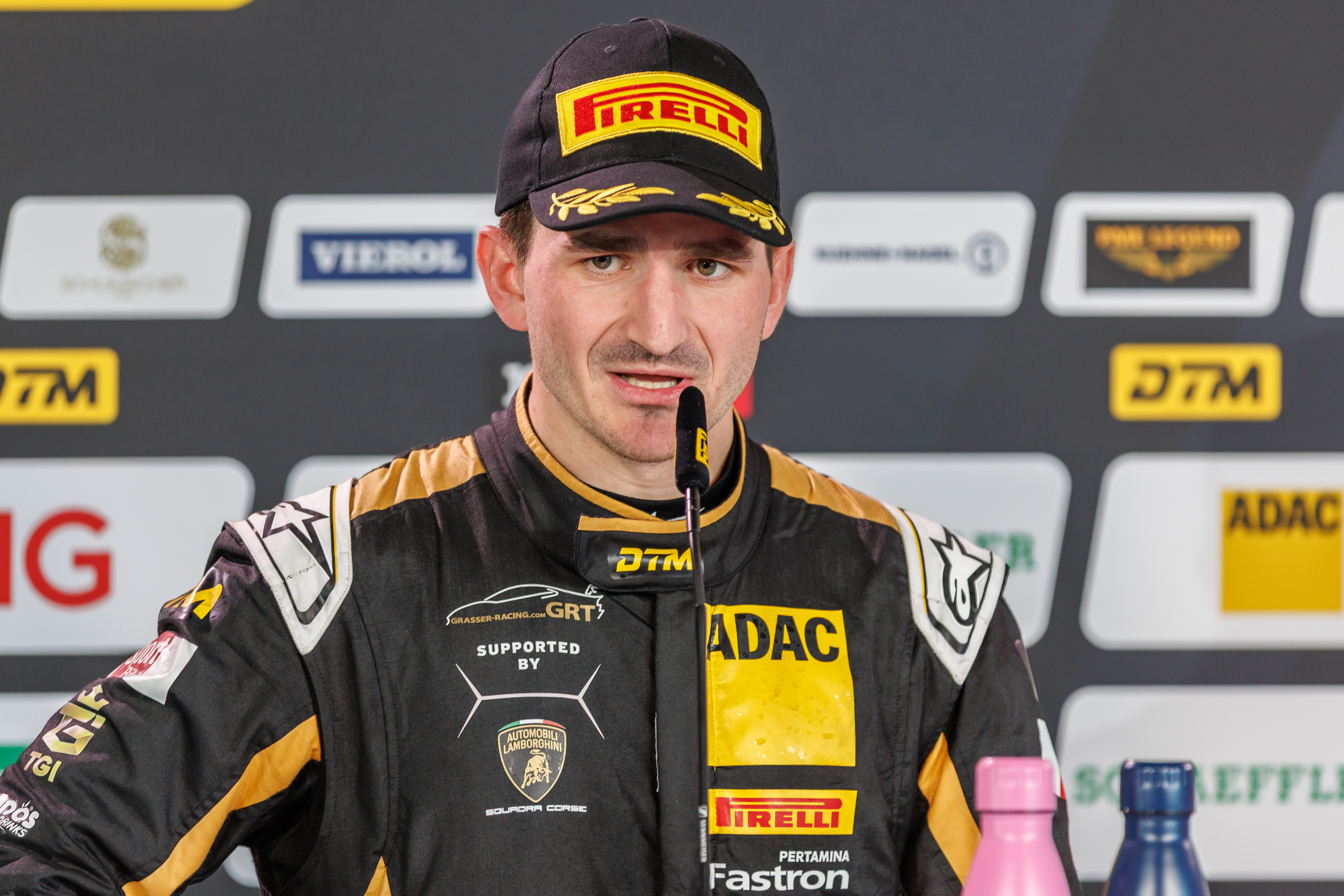
- Pepper in 2025
- Nationality: (South Africa) South African
- Born: Jordan Lee Pepper; 31 July 1996 (age 30) Edenvale, Gauteng, South Africa
- Relatives: Iain Pepper (father); Tasmin Pepper (sister)

Blancpain GT Series Endurance Cup
- Categorisation: FIA Silver (until 2018); FIA Gold (2019–2022); FIA Platinum (2023–)
- Years active: 2017–2019
- Teams: Bentley Team Abt; Bentley Team M-Sport
- Starts: 11
- Wins: 1
- Poles: 1
- Fastest laps: 2
- Best finish: 14th in 2018

Previous series
- 2012 2013–14 2015–16: Volkswagen Polo Cup South Africa; Volkswagen Scirocco R-Cup Germany; ADAC GT Masters

Championship titles
- 2014: Volkswagen Scirocco R-Cup Germany

Jordan Lee Pepper (born 31 July 1996) is a South African racing driver, currently competing in the Blancpain GT Series Endurance Cup. He is the son of former South African Touring Car driver Iain Pepper and younger brother of W Series driver Tasmin Pepper.

Pepper was the winner of the 2020 Bathurst 12 Hour for Bentley with Jules Gounon and Maxime Soulet. In 2023, he became a Lamborghini factory driver. Together with Mirko Bortolotti and Luca Engstler, Pepper won the 2025 24 Hours of Spa.

== Career ==
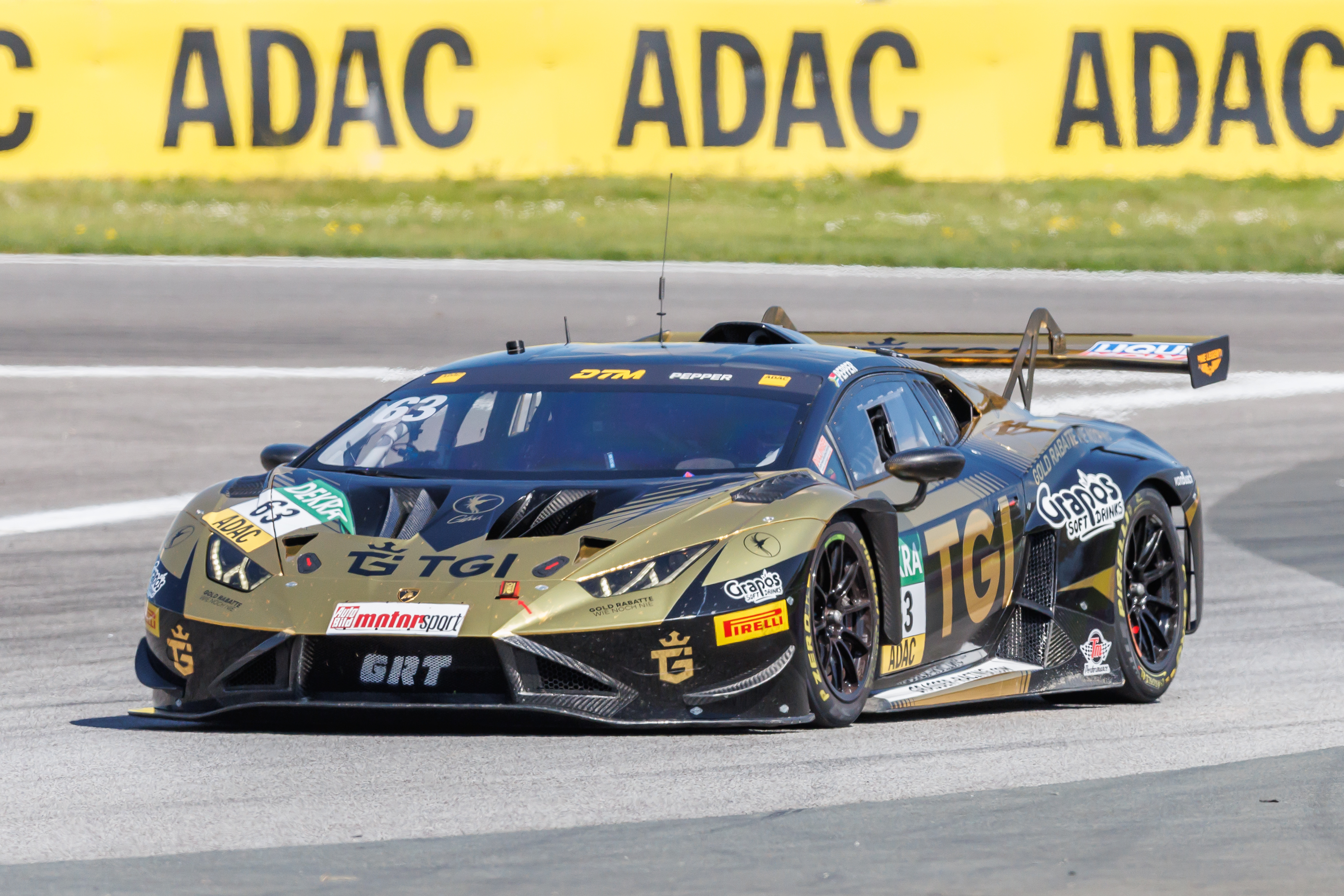
Pepper at Motorsport Arena Oschersleben in 2025

After last taking part in the GT World Challenge Europe Endurance Cup in 2020 with Bentley, Pepper returned to the series in 2023. As a newly minted Lamborghini factory driver, he joined fellow factory drivers Andrea Caldarelli and Mirko Bortolotti in Iron Lynx's Pro class entry. In the Sprint Cup, Pepper joined Franck Perera in Vincenzo Sospiri Racing's Pro class entry.

== Racing record ==
=== Career summary ===
Season	Series	Team	Races	Wins	Poles	F/Laps	Podiums	Points	Position
2012	Volkswagen Polo Cup South Africa	N/A	20	1	?	?	7	332	**3rd**
2013	Volkswagen Scirocco R-Cup Germany	N/A	9	1	0	1	2	256	**3rd**
2014	Volkswagen Scirocco R-Cup Germany	N/A	10	6	7	3	9	379	**1st**
2014	Volkswagen Castrol Cup	N/A	2	0	0	0	0	0	NC
2015	ADAC GT Masters	C. Abt Racing	16	1	0	0	2	87	12th
2016	ADAC GT Masters	Bentley Team Abt	13	0	0	0	1	33	22nd
2017	Blancpain GT Series Endurance Cup	Bentley Team Abt	1	0	0	0	0	0	NC
2017	Intercontinental GT Challenge	Bentley Team Abt	1	0	0	0	0	0	NC
2017	24 Hours of Nürburgring - SP9 LG	Bentley Team Abt	1	0	0	0	0	N/A	DNF
2018	Blancpain GT Series Endurance Cup	Bentley Team M-Sport	3	0	0	0	1	29	14th
2018	Intercontinental GT Challenge	Bentley Team M-Sport	3	0	0	0	0	4	23rd
2018	Blancpain GT Series Asia	Bentley Team Phoenix Racing Asia	4	0	0	0	0	0	NC†
2018	Porsche Carrera Cup Asia	Kamlung Racing	4	0	0	0	0	39	17th
2019	Blancpain GT Series Endurance Cup	Bentley Team M-Sport	5	1	1	0	2	49	4th
2019	Intercontinental GT Challenge	Bentley Team M-Sport	5	0	0	0	0	10	25th
2020	GT World Challenge Europe Endurance Cup	Bentley K-PAX Racing	4	0	0	0	0	15	16th
2020	ADAC GT Masters	T3-HRT-Motorsport	11	0	0	0	0	7	38th
2020	Intercontinental GT Challenge	Bentley Team M-Sport	2	1	0	0	1	28	7th
2020	Intercontinental GT Challenge	K-PAX Racing	2	0	0	0	0	28	7th
2020	Nürburgring Endurance Series - SP9 Pro	Walkenhorst Motorsport	1	0	0	0	0	6.88	68th
2020	24 Hours of Nürburgring - SP9	Walkenhorst Motorsport	1	0	0	0	0	N/A	12th
2021	International GT Open	Team Lazarus	2	1	1	2	1	21	11th
2021	GT World Challenge America - Pro	K-PAX Racing	12	9	8	7	11	270	**1st**
2021	Intercontinental GT Challenge	K-PAX Racing	1	0	0	0	1	15	13th
2021	GT World Challenge Europe Endurance Cup	Inception Racing with Optimum Motorsport	1	0	0	0	0	0	NC
2022	IMSA SportsCar Championship - GTD	Inception Racing	5	0	0	2	2	1445	14th
2022	GT World Challenge America - Pro	K-PAX Racing	13	2	1	4	11	229	**2nd**
2022	GT World Challenge Europe Endurance Cup	Orange 1 K-PAX Racing	1	0	0	0	0	0	NC
2022	Intercontinental GT Challenge	Orange 1 K-PAX Racing							
2022	Intercontinental GT Challenge	K-PAX Racing							
2022	24 Hours of Nürburgring - SP9	Konrad Motorsport	1	0	0	0	0	N/A	10th
2023	IMSA SportsCar Championship - GTD Pro	Iron Lynx	4	0	0	0	0	1137	7th
2023	GT World Challenge Europe Endurance Cup	Iron Lynx	5	0	0	0	1	15	14th
2023	GT World Challenge Europe Sprint Cup	VSR	6	0	1	0	0	11.5	12th
2023	24 Hours of Nürburgring - SP9	ABT Sportsline	1	0	0	0	0	N/A	9th
2024	IMSA SportsCar Championship - GTD Pro	Iron Lynx	4	1	0	0	2	1211	16th
2024	International GT Open	Oregon Team	12	2	1	0	4	100	4th
2024	Nürburgring Langstrecken-Serie - SP9	Red Bull Team ABT	1	0	0	1	1	*	*
2024	24 Hours of Nürburgring - SP9	Red Bull Team ABT	1	0	0	0	0	N/A	5th
2024	GT World Challenge Europe Endurance Cup	GRT Grasser Racing Team	4	1	0	2	2	63	**2nd**
2024	Deutsche Tourenwagen Masters	Lamborghini Team TGI by GRT	2	0	0	0	0	6	22nd
2024	24 Hours of Le Mans - Hypercar	Lamborghini Iron Lynx	Reserve driver						
2025	Deutsche Tourenwagen Masters	TGI Lamborghini Team by GRT	16	1	3	0	3	164	7th
2025	IMSA SportsCar Championship - GTD Pro	Pfaff Motorsports	1	0	0	0	0	206	42th
2025	Nürburgring Langstrecken-Serie - SP9	Red Bull Team ABT							
2025	24 Hours of Nürburgring - SP9	Red Bull Team ABT	1	0	0	0	0	N/A	DNF
2025	GT World Challenge Europe Endurance Cup	GRT - Grasser Racing Team	5	1	0	0	1	44	5th
2025	GT World Challenge Europe Sprint Cup	GRT - Grasser Racing Team	10	2	2	2	6	81.5	**2nd**
2025-26	24H Series Middle East - GT3	Team WRT							
2026	Nürburgring Langstrecken-Serie - SP9	Rowe Racing	2	1	0	0	1	38	NC†
2026	Nürburgring Langstrecken-Serie - SP9	Schubert Motorsport	3	1	0	0	2	38	NC†
2026	GT World Challenge Europe Endurance Cup	Team WRT	5	0	0	0	1	42	4th
2026	GT World Challenge Europe Sprint Cup	Team WRT	10	0	0	0	0	16	20th
2026	24 Hours of Nürburgring - SP9	Rowe Racing	1	0	0	0	0	N/A	DNF

^{†} As Pepper was a guest driver, he was ineligible for points.
*Season still in progress.

=== Complete ADAC GT Masters results ===
(key) (Races in bold indicate pole position) (Races in italics indicate fastest lap)

Year	Team	Car	1	2	3	4	5	6	7	8	9	10	11	12	13	14	15	16	DC	Points
2015	C. Abt Racing	Audi R8 LMS Ultra	OSC; 1; 8	OSC; 2; 15	RBR; 1; 12	RBR; 2; 13	SPA; 1; 11	SPA; 2; 4	LAU; 1; 11	LAU; 2; 14	NÜR; 1; 5	NÜR; 2 Ret	SAC; 1 Ret	SAC; 2; 9	ZAN; 1; 5	ZAN; 2; 3	HOC; 1; 8	HOC; 2; 1	12th	87
2016	Bentley Team Abt	Bentley Continental GT3	OSC; 1; 15	OSC; 2; 18	SAC; 1; 20	SAC; 2 Ret	LAU; 1; 17	LAU; 2 Ret	**RBR**; **1** DNS	RBR; 2; 2	NÜR; 1; 4	NÜR; 2; 11	ZAN; 1; 10	ZAN; 2; 21	HOC; 1; 14	HOC; 2; 9			22nd	33
2020	T3-HRT-Motorsport	Bentley Continental GT3	LAU1; 1; 21	LAU1; 2 Ret	NÜR; 1 Ret	NÜR; 2; 30	HOC; 1; 26	HOC; 2; 28	SAC; 1	SAC; 2	RBR; 1 DSQ	RBR; 2 Ret	LAU2; 1; 10	LAU2; 2; 15	OSC; 1; 23	OSC; 2; 17			38th	7

=== Complete GT World Challenge Europe results ===
==== GT World Challenge Europe Endurance Cup ====
(key) (Races in bold indicate pole position; results in italics indicate fastest lap)

Year	Team	Car	Class	1	2	3	4	5	6	7	Pos.	Points
Blancpain GT Series Endurance Cup
2017	Bentley Team Abt	Bentley Continental GT3	Pro	MNZ	SIL	LEC	SPA; 6H; 16	SPA; 12H; 18	SPA; 24H; Ret	CAT	NC	0
2018	Bentley Team M-Sport	Bentley Continental GT3	Pro	MNZ	SIL	LEC; 2	SPA; 6H; 11	SPA; 12H; 5	SPA; 24H; 25	CAT; 21	14th	29
2019	Bentley Team M-Sport	Bentley Continental GT3	Pro	MNZ; 12	SIL; 12	**LEC**; 1	SPA; 6H; 16	SPA; 12H; 28	SPA; 24H; 49	CAT; 3	4th	49
GT World Challenge Europe Endurance Cup
2020	Bentley K-PAX Racing	Bentley Continental GT3	Pro	IMO; 17	NÜR; 6	SPA; 6H; 10	SPA; 12H; 5	SPA; 24H; 10	LEC; 13		16th	15
2021	Inception Racing with Optimum Motorsport	McLaren 720S GT3	Pro-Am	MNZ	LEC	SPA; 6H; 53	SPA; 12H; 42	SPA; 24H; 28	NÜR	CAT	34th	4
2022	Orange 1 K-PAX Racing	Lamborghini Huracán GT3 Evo	Pro	IMO	LEC	SPA; 6H; 31	SPA; 12H; 22	SPA; 24H; 11	HOC	CAT	NC	0
2023	Iron Lynx	Lamborghini Huracán GT3 Evo 2	Pro	MNZ; 3	LEC; 39†	SPA; 6H; 61	SPA; 12H; Ret	SPA; 24H; Ret	NÜR; Ret	CAT; 20	14th	15
2024	GRT Grasser Racing Team	Lamborghini Huracán GT3 Evo 2	Pro	LEC	SPA; 6H; 17	SPA; 12H; 8	**SPA**; **24H**; 5	NÜR; 1	MNZ; 10	JED; 2	2nd	63
2025	GRT - Grasser Racing Team	Lamborghini Huracán GT3 Evo 2	Pro	LEC; 12	MNZ; 46†	SPA; 6H; 23	SPA; 12H; 2	SPA; 24H; 1	NÜR; 5	CAT; 16	5th	44
2026	Team WRT	BMW M4 GT3 Evo	Pro	LEC; 4	MNZ; 30	SPA; 6H; 2	SPA; 12H; 24	SPA; 24H; 12	NÜR; 2	ALG; 29	4th	42

* Season still in progress.

==== GT World Challenge Europe Sprint Cup ====
(key) (Races in bold indicate pole position; results in italics indicate fastest lap)

Year	Team	Car	Class	1	2	3	4	5	6	7	8	9	10	Pos.	Points
2023	VSR	Lamborghini Huracán GT3 Evo 2	Pro	BRH; 1; 6	BRH; 2; 25†	MIS; 1; 7	MIS; 2; 8	**HOC**; **1**; 32†	HOC; 2; 9	VAL; 1	VAL; 2	ZAN; 1	ZAN; 2	12th	11.5
2025	GRT - Grasser Racing Team	Lamborghini Huracán GT3 Evo 2	Pro	BRH; 1; 24	BRH; 2; 16	ZAN; 1; 2	ZAN; 2; 3	MIS; 1; 9	MIS; 2; 11	**MAG**; **1**; 1	MAG; 2; 2	VAL; 1; 1	**VAL**; **2**; 2	2nd	81.5
2026	Team WRT	BMW M4 GT3 Evo	Pro	BRH; 1; 4	BRH; 2; 7	MIS; 1; 7	MIS; 2; 10	MAG; 1; 20	MAG; 2; 11	ZAN; 1 Ret	ZAN; 2 Ret	CAT; 1	CAT; 2	16th*	14*

=== Complete 24 Hours of Nürburgring results ===
Year	Team	Co-Drivers	Car	Class	Laps	Pos.	Class Pos.
2017	(Germany) Bentley Team Abt	(Germany) Christopher Brück (Germany) Christer Jöns (Germany) Christian Mamerow	Bentley Continental GT3	SP9 LG	26	DNF	DNF
2020	(Germany) Walkenhorst Motorsport	(South Africa) Mikkel Jensen (Norway) Christian Krognes (United Kingdom) David Pittard	BMW M6 GT3	SP9	83	12th	12th
2022	(Austria) Konrad Motorsport	(Germany) Michele Di Martino (Germany) Maximilian Hackländer (Zimbabwe) Axcil Jefferies	Lamborghini Huracán GT3 Evo	SP9 Pro-Am	156	10th	**2nd**
2023	(Germany) ABT Sportsline	(Italy) Marco Mapelli (Denmark) Nicki Thiim (South Africa) Kelvin van der Linde	Lamborghini Huracán GT3 Evo 2	SP9 Pro	160	9th	7th
2024	(Germany) Red Bull Team ABT	(Italy) Marco Mapelli (South Africa) Kelvin van der Linde	Lamborghini Huracán GT3 Evo 2	SP9 Pro	50	5th	5th
2025	(Germany) Red Bull Team ABT	(Italy) Mirko Bortolotti (Spain) Daniel Juncadella	Lamborghini Huracán GT3 Evo 2	SP9 Pro	126	DNF	DNF
2026	(Germany) Rowe Racing	(Brazil) Augusto Farfus (Switzerland) Raffaele Marciello (South Africa) Kelvin van der Linde	BMW M4 GT3 Evo	SP9 Pro	49	DNF	DNF

=== Complete Bathurst 12 Hour results ===
Year	Team	Co-Drivers	Car	Class	Laps	Pos.	Class Pos.
2019	(United Kingdom) Bentley Team M-Sport	(France) Jules Gounon (United Kingdom) Steven Kane	Bentley Continental GT3	APP	311	8th	8th
2020	(United Kingdom) Bentley Team M-Sport	(France) Jules Gounon (Belgium) Maxime Soulet	Bentley Continental GT3	AP	314	**1st**	**1st**
2026	(Belgium) Team WRT	(South Africa) Kelvin van der Linde (Belgium) Charles Weerts	BMW M4 GT3 Evo	Pro	262	12th	8th

=== Complete IMSA SportsCar Championship results ===
(key) (Races in bold indicate pole position; results in italics indicate fastest lap)

Year	Team	Class	Make	Engine	1	2	3	4	5	6	7	8	9	10	11	12	Pos.	Points
2022	Inception Racing	GTD	McLaren 720S GT3	McLaren M840T 4.0 L Turbo V8	DAY; 5	SEB; 5	LBH	LAG	MDO; 11†	DET	WGL; 2	MOS	LIM	ELK	VIR	PET; 2	14th	1445
2023	Iron Lynx	GTD Pro	Lamborghini Huracán GT3 Evo 2	Lamborghini 5.2 L V10	DAY; 4	SEB; 4	LBH	MON	WGL; 9	MOS	LIM	ELK	VIR	IMS	PET; 6		7th	1137
2024	Iron Lynx	GTD Pro	Lamborghini Huracán GT3 Evo 2	Lamborghini 5.2 L V10	DAY; 7	SEB; 3	LGA	DET	WGL; 9	MOS	ELK	VIR	IMS	PET; 1			16th	1211
2025	Pfaff Motorsports	GTD Pro	Lamborghini Huracán GT3 Evo 2	Lamborghini 5.2 L V10	DAY; 13	SEB	LGA	DET	WGL	MOS	ELK	VIR	IMS	PET			42nd	206

=== Complete Deutsche Tourenwagen Masters results ===
(key) (Races in bold indicate pole position) (Races in italics indicate fastest lap)

Year	Team	Car	1	2	3	4	5	6	7	8	9	10	11	12	13	14	15	16	Pos	Points
2024	Lamborghini Team TGI by GRT	Lamborghini Huracán GT3 Evo 2	OSC; 1	OSC; 2	LAU; 1	LAU; 2	ZAN; 1	ZAN; 2	NOR; 1	NOR; 2	NÜR; 1	NÜR; 2	SAC; 1; 10	SAC; 2 Ret	RBR; 1	RBR; 2	HOC; 1	HOC; 2	22nd	6
2025	TGI Team Lamborghini by GRT	Lamborghini Huracán GT3 Evo 2	OSC; 1; 2^{2}	OSC; 2; 4^{2}	LAU; 1; 11	LAU; 2; 4	**ZAN**; **1**; 7^{1}	ZAN; 2 Ret	**NOR**; **1**; 1^{1}	NOR; 2; 9	NÜR; 1; 4	NÜR; 2; 9	**SAC**; **1**; 2^{1}	SAC; 2 Ret	RBR; 1; 7	RBR; 2; 6	HOC; 1 Ret	HOC; 2 DSQ	7th	164

Sporting positions
Preceded by Matthew Campbell; Dennis Olsen; Dirk Werner	Winner of the Bathurst 12 Hour; 2020; With: Jules Gounon & Maxime Soulet	Succeeded by Incumbent
