= Thierry Vermeulen =

Dutch racing driver (born 2002)

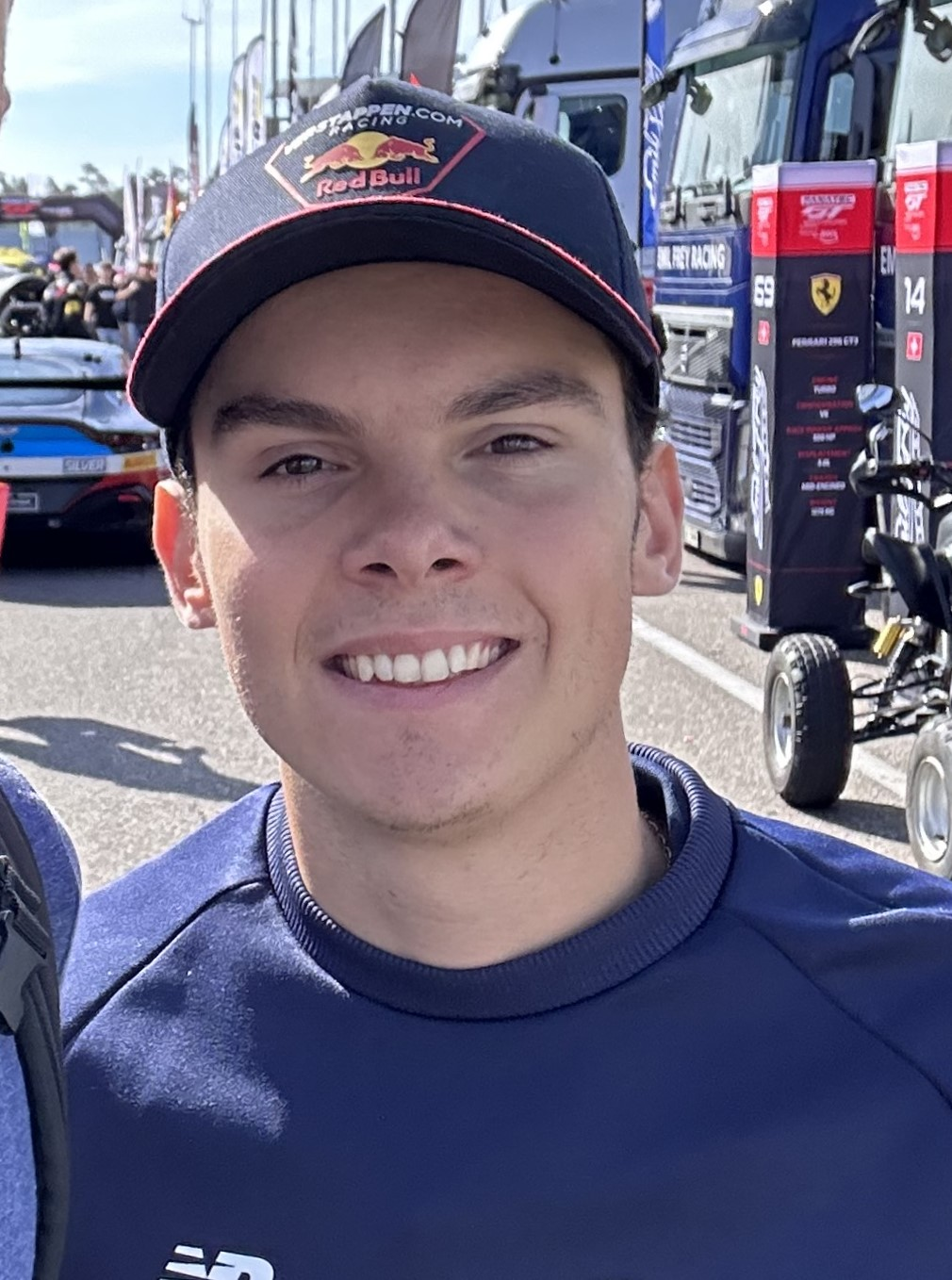
- Vermeulen in 2023
- Nationality: (Netherlands) Dutch
- Born: Thierry Egidius Gerardus Vermeulen; 29 July 2002 (age 24) Venlo, Netherlands

Deutsche Tourenwagen Masters career
- Debut season: 2023
- Current team: Emil Frey Racing
- Categorisation: FIA Silver (until 2023); FIA Gold (2024–)
- Car number: 69
- Starts: 63 (63 entries)
- Wins: 0
- Podiums: 5
- Poles: 3
- Fastest laps: 2
- Best finish: 10th in 2025

Previous series
- 2022 2022 2021-22 2021 2020: ADAC GT Masters; GTWC Europe Endurance Cup; Porsche Sprint Challenge ME; Porsche Carrera Cup Germany; GT4 European Series

Championship titles
- 2020 2025 2025: Porsche Sprint Challenge Benelux - GT4; GT World Challenge Europe Sprint Cup - Gold Cup; GT World Challenge Europe Endurance Cup - Gold Cup

Thierry Egidius Gerardus Vermeulen (born 29 July 2002) is a Dutch racing driver currently competing for Emil Frey Racing in the Deutsche Tourenwagen Masters. He is supported by four-time Formula One World Drivers' Champion Max Verstappen. He previously competed in the ADAC GT Masters, scoring a podium alongside Mattia Drudi.

== Early career ==
Vermeulen began his racing career in 2020, competing for Team GP Elite in the GT4 CS class of the Porsche Sprint Challenge Benelux. He would experience a dominant campaign, winning every race but one on his way towards the title. During the same year, he would also make an appearance in the GT4 European Series at Le Castellet alongside Max Koebolt.

In 2021, Vermeulen would continue in Porsches, switching to the Porsche Carrera Cup Benelux. He won a race at Assen and placed sixth in the standings. Other appearances that season included three drives in the 24H GT Series and a one-off in the Porsche Carrera Cup Germany.

During the winter, Vermeulen contested the Porsche Sprint Challenge Middle East, where he amassed five podiums.

== GT3 career ==
=== 2022 ===
Having made his first GT3 outing at the Kyalami 9 Hours in February, Vermeulen made a switch to the category with a campaign in the ADAC GT Masters, driving an Audi R8 LMS Evo II for Car Collection Motorsport. He and teammate Mattia Drudi collected a lone podium at Vermeulen's home track in Zandvoort, however this would only be enough for 23rd in the standings. Nevertheless, Vermeulen had spent the year improving his speed thanks to his teammate's coaching according to team manager Denis Ferlemann.

=== 2023 ===
Vermeulen performed double-duties the following year, driving for Emil Frey Racing in both the GT World Challenge Europe Sprint Cup, where he was paired up with Albert Costa, and the DTM. In the latter, the Dutchman struggled to keep pace with race-winning teammate Jack Aitken, though he would become a regular top-ten finisher during the second half of the season, leaving him 16th overall with a best result of fifth at the Sachsenring. The former series saw him and Costa take three podiums at the back end of the season, missing another when Vermeulen was penalised for colliding with Dries Vanthoor at the final corner in Hockenheim, which resulted in fourth place in the championship.

=== 2024 ===
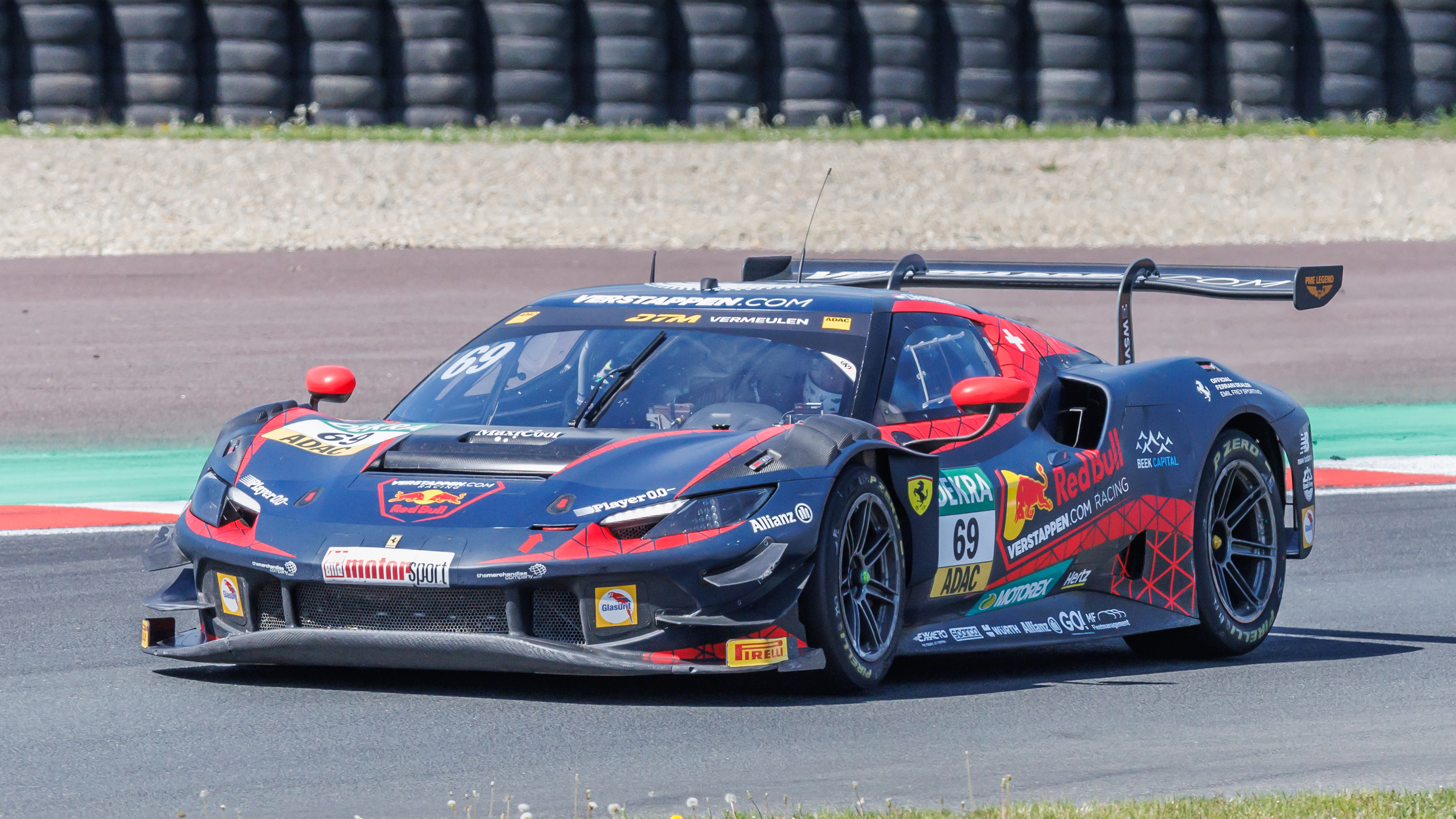
Vermeulen at Motorsport Arena Oschersleben in 2025

For the 2024 season, Vermeulen returned to contest the DTM with Emil Frey and remained with the team in the GTWC Sprint Cup, this time partnering Giacomo Altoè. At the opening DTM round in Oschersleben, the Dutchman collided with René Rast, resulting in an incensed Vermeulen showing the German the middle finger — he later received a reprimand for causing the collision and a warning for the gesture. Vermeulen only scored one top five finish during the first half of the campaign, finishing fourth at his home race in Zandvoort after qualifying third. A few rounds later, Vermeulen managed to claim his first pole position in the DTM, qualifying first for the second race at the Sachsenring. He would control the race until after the mandatory pit stop, when a penalty lap was issued as one of the mechanics had left a tyre on the ground in the pit lane, which demoted Vermeulen to third. Vermeulen ended up 15th in the drivers' standings.

== Personal life ==
As of 2023, Vermeulen lives in Monaco. His father Raymond is the manager of four-time Formula One World Champion Max Verstappen. As of 2023, Vermeulen was being mentored by Jos Verstappen.

== Racing record ==
=== Racing career summary ===
Season	Series	Team	Races	Wins	Poles	F/Laps	Podiums	Points	Position
2020	Porsche Sprint Challenge Benelux - GT4 CS	Team GP Elite	12	11	5	?	12	?	**1st**
2020	GT4 European Series - Silver	Selleslagh Racing Team	2	0	0	0	0	0	NC†
2021	24H GT Series - 991	MRS GT-Racing	2	0	0	1	0	0	NC†
2021	24H GT Series - GTX	Red Camel-Jordans.nl	1	0	0	0	1	24	13th
2021	Porsche Carrera Cup Benelux	Team GP Elite	12	1	2	1	3	114	6th
2021	Porsche Carrera Cup Germany	Team GP Elite	2	0	0	0	0	5	24th
2021	Intercontinental GT Challenge	High Class Racing with WRT	1	0	0	0	0	8	26th
2021–22	Porsche Sprint Challenge Middle East	GP Elite	10	0	0	0	5	71	12th
2022	ADAC GT Masters	Car Collection Motorsport	14	0	0	0	1	51	23rd
2022	GT World Challenge Europe Endurance Cup	Tresor by Car Collection	2	0	0	0	0	0	NC
2022	GT World Challenge Europe Endurance Cup - Silver	Tresor by Car Collection	2	0	0	0	0	0	NC
2022	24H GT Series - 992	Team GP-Elite	1	0	1	0	1	0	NC†
2022	24H GT Series - 992	RABDAN Motorsports by ID Racing	1	0	0	0	0	0	NC†
2023	24H GT Series - GT3	Team GP Elite	1	0	0	0	0	0	NC†
2023	Deutsche Tourenwagen Masters	Emil Frey Racing	16	0	0	0	0	58	16th
2023	GT World Challenge Europe Sprint Cup	Emil Frey Racing	10	0	0	1	3	62.5	4th
2023–24	Middle East Trophy - GT3	racing one	1	0	0	0	0	0	NC
2024	Deutsche Tourenwagen Masters	Emil Frey Racing	16	0	1	2	1	71	15th
2024	GT World Challenge Europe Sprint Cup	Emil Frey Racing	10	0	0	0	2	43.5	4th
2024	Nürburgring Langstrecken-Serie - Cup3	Lionspeed GP	2	0	0	0	0	*	*
2024	Nürburgring Langstrecken-Serie - SP9	Konrad Motorsport	2	0	0	0	0	0*	*
2025	Middle East Trophy - GT3	Team Motopark							
2025	Deutsche Tourenwagen Masters	Emil Frey Racing	16	0	2	0	3	102	10th
2025	GT World Challenge Europe Sprint Cup	Emil Frey Racing	10	0	1	1	1	23	7th
2025	GT World Challenge Europe Sprint Cup - Gold Cup	Emil Frey Racing	10	4	6	2	7	118.5	**1st**
2025	GT World Challenge Europe Endurance Cup	Verstappen.com Racing	5	0	0	0	0	8	21st
2025	GT World Challenge Europe Endurance Cup - Gold	Verstappen.com Racing	5	2	0	1	5	121	**1st**
2025	GT World Challenge Asia	Absolute Corse	4	0	0	0	0	11	34th
2025	Gulf 12 Hours - Pro-Am	Razoon – more than racing	1	0	0	0	0	N/A	5th
2025–26	24H Series Middle East - GT3	Razoon – more than racing							
2026	IMSA SportsCar Championship - GTD	Conquest Racing	1	0	0	0	0	188	75th
2026	Deutsche Tourenwagen Masters	Emil Frey Racing	16	0	0	0	1	107	11th
2026	GT World Challenge Europe Sprint Cup	Emil Frey Racing	10	2	1	0	3	56.5	4th
2026	Nürburgring Langstrecken-Serie - SP9	Realize Kondo Racing with Rinaldi							
2026	24 Hours of Nürburgring - SP9	Realize Kondo Racing with Rinaldi	1	0	0	0	0	N/A	DNF
2026	GT World Challenge Asia	Absolute Corse	4	0	0	0	0	8	35th
2026	GT World Challenge Europe Endurance Cup	JMW Motorsport	1	0	0	0	0	0	NC

^{†} As Vermeulen was a guest driver, he was ineligible to score points.
* Season still in progress.

=== Complete Porsche Sprint Challenge Benelux results ===
(key) (Races in bold indicate pole position)

Year	Team	Class	1	2	3	4	5	6	7	8	9	10	11	12	Pos.	Points
2020	Team GP Elite	GT4 CS	**ZOL**; **1**; 1	**ZOL**; **2**; 1	ZOL; 3; 1	NÜR; 1; 1	**NÜR**; **2**; 1	NÜR; 3; 1	**ZND**; **1**; 1	**ZND**; **2**; 1	ZND; 3; 1	ZOL; 1; 1	ZOL; 2; 3	ZOL; 3; 1	1st	?

=== Complete Porsche Carrera Cup Benelux results ===
(key) (Races in bold indicate pole position) (Races in italics indicate fastest lap)

Year	Team	1	2	3	4	5	6	7	8	9	10	11	12	Pos.	Points
2021	Team GP Elite	SPA; 1; 4	SPA; 2 Ret	RBR; 1; 12	RBR; 2 Ret	ZND; 1; 9	ZND; 2; 2	ZOL; 1; 5	ZOL; 2 Ret	ASS; 1; 5	ASS; 2; 1	HOC; 1 Ret	HOC; 2; 2	6th	114

=== Complete ADAC GT Masters results ===
(key) (Races in bold indicate pole position) (Races in italics indicate fastest lap)

Year	Team	Car	1	2	3	4	5	6	7	8	9	10	11	12	13	14	DC	Points
2022	Car Collection Motorsport	Audi R8 LMS Evo II	OSC; 1; 16	OSC; 2; 9	RBR; 1; 21†	RBR; 2 Ret	ZAN; 1; 16	ZAN; 2; 2	NÜR; 1 Ret	NÜR; 2; 19†	LAU; 1; 13	LAU; 2; 15	SAC; 1; 10	SAC; 2; 12	HOC; 1; 17†	HOC; 2; 7	23rd	51

=== Complete GT World Challenge Europe results ===
==== GT World Challenge Europe Endurance Cup ====
Year	Team	Car	Class	1	2	3	4	5	6	7	Pos.	Points
2022	Tresor by Car Collection	Audi R8 LMS Evo II	Silver	IMO	LEC	SPA; 6H	SPA; 12H	SPA; 24H	HOC; Ret	CAT; 21	NC	0
2025	Verstappen.com Racing	Aston Martin Vantage AMR GT3 Evo	Gold	LEC; 9	MNZ; 15	SPA; 6H; 11	SPA; 12H; 10	SPA; 24H; 9	NÜR; 17	CAT; 8	1st	121
2026	JMW Motorsport	Ferrari 296 GT3 Evo	Pro	LEC	MNZ	SPA; 6H	SPA; 12H	SPA; 24H	NÜR; 30	ALG	NC	0

==== GT World Challenge Europe Sprint Cup ====
(key) (Races in bold indicate pole position) (Races in italics indicate fastest lap)

Year	Team	Car	Class	1	2	3	4	5	6	7	8	9	10	Pos.	Points
2023	Emil Frey Racing	Ferrari 296 GT3	Pro	BRH; 1; 7	BRH; 2; 14	MIS; 1; 5	MIS; 2; 5	HOC; 1; 4	HOC; 2; 6	VAL; 1; 2	VAL; 2; 3	ZAN; 1; 2	ZAN; 2; 8	4th	62.5
2024	Emil Frey Racing	Ferrari 296 GT3	Pro	BRH; 1; 11	BRH; 2; 2	MIS; 1; 3	MIS; 2; 4	HOC; 1; 8	HOC; 2; 22	MAG; 1; 4	MAG; 2; 10	CAT; 1; 10	CAT; 2; 6	4th	43.5
2025	Emil Frey Racing	Ferrari 296 GT3	Gold	**BRH**; **1**; 3	**BRH**; **2**; 9	ZAN; 1; 11	**ZAN**; **2**; 13	**MIS**; **1** Ret	MIS; 2; 7	**MAG**; **1**; 22	**MAG**; **2**; 26	VAL; 1; 4	VAL; 2; 9	1st	118.5
2026	Emil Frey Racing	Ferrari 296 GT3 Evo	Pro	BRH; 1; 10	BRH; 2; 11	MIS; 1; 4	MIS; 2; 5	MAG; 1; 15	MAG; 2 Ret	ZAN; 1; 3	ZAN; 2; 1	CAT; 1 Ret	**CAT**; **2**; 1	4th	56.5

^{*}Season still in progress.

=== Complete Deutsche Tourenwagen Masters results ===
(key) (Races in bold indicate pole position) (Races in italics indicate fastest lap)

Year	Entrant	Chassis	1	2	3	4	5	6	7	8	9	10	11	12	13	14	15	16	Rank	Points
2023	Emil Frey Racing	Ferrari 296 GT3	OSC; 1; 15	OSC; 2; 16	ZAN; 1 Ret	ZAN; 2 Ret	NOR; 1; 20	NOR; 2; 21	NÜR; 1; 10	NÜR; 2; 8	LAU; 1; 9	LAU; 2; 9	SAC; 1; 10	SAC; 2; 5	RBR; 1 DSQ	RBR; 2; 9	HOC; 1; 11	HOC; 2; 23	16th	58
2024	Emil Frey Racing	Ferrari 296 GT3	OSC; 1; 9	OSC; 2 Ret	LAU; 1; 17	LAU; 2; 13	ZAN; 1; 15	ZAN; 2; 4^{3}	NOR; 1; 17	NOR; 2; 15	NÜR; 1; 16	NÜR; 2; 6	SAC; 1; 11	**SAC**; **2**; 3^{1}	RBR; 1 DSQ	RBR; 2; 13	HOC; 1; 13	HOC; 2; 11	15th	71
2025	Emil Frey Racing	Ferrari 296 GT3	OSC; 1; 13	OSC; 2; 13^{3}	LAU; 1; 15	LAU; 2; 7	ZAN; 1 Ret	ZAN; 2; 13	NOR; 1; 4^{3}	**NOR**; **2**; 3^{1}	NÜR; 1; 15^{2}	NÜR; 2; 21	SAC; 1 Ret	SAC; 2; 13	RBR; 1; 3	**RBR**; **2**; 2^{1}	HOC; 1; 19	HOC; 2; 12	10th	102
2026	Emil Frey Racing	Ferrari 296 GT3 Evo	RBR; 1; 13	RBR; 2; 9	ZAN; 1; 3^{2}	ZAN; 2; 5^{2}	LAU; 1; 13	LAU; 2; 14	NOR; 1; 5	NOR; 2; 6	OSC; 1; 9	OSC; 2; 14	NÜR; 1; 13	NÜR; 2; 12	SAC; 1; 9	SAC; 2; 7	HOC; 1; 12	HOC; 2; 12	11th	107

=== Complete GT World Challenge Asia results ===
(key) (Races in bold indicate pole position) (Races in italics indicate fastest lap)

Year	Team	Car	1	2	3	4	5	6	7	8	9	10	11	12	DC	Points
2025	Absolute Corse	Ferrari 296 GT3	SEP; 1	SEP; 2	MAN; 1; 10	MAN; 2; 18	BUR; 1	BUR; 2	FUJ; 1; 7	FUJ; 2; 8	OKA; 1	OKA; 2	BEI; 1	BEI; 2	34th	11
2026	Absolute Corse	Ferrari 296 GT3	SEP; 1; 9	SEP; 2; 7	MAN; 1	MAN; 2	SHA; 1	SHA; 2	FUJ; 1	FUJ; 2	OKA; 1	OKA; 2	BEI; 1	BEI; 2	10th*	8*

=== Complete IMSA SportsCar Championship results ===
(key) (Races in bold indicate pole position; races in italics indicate fastest lap)

Year	Entrant	Class	Make	Engine	1	2	3	4	5	6	7	8	9	10	Rank	Points
2026	Conquest Racing	GTD	Ferrari 296 GT3 Evo	Ferrari F163CE 3.0 L Turbo V6	DAY; 14	SEB	LBH	LGA	WGL	MOS	ELK	VIR	IMS	PET	75th	188

Sporting positions
Preceded by Luca Engstler; Max Hofer	GT World Challenge Europe Sprint Cup; Gold Cup Champion; 2025; With: Chris Lulham	Succeeded by Incumbent
