= 2023 24 Hours of Nürburgring =

Endurance motor race in Germany

Nürburgring 24h track (Nordschleife+GP Circuit without Mercedes-Arena)

The 2023 Nürburgring 24 Hours (officially known as ADAC TotalEnergies 24h Race at the Nürburgring Nordschleife for sponsorship reasons) was the 51st running of the Nürburgring 24 Hours, which took place over 20–21 May 2023. The Frikadelli Racing Team won overall with a Ferrari 296 GT3, the first win for an Italian car and the first non-German marque to win the race since Chrysler in 2002.

This was the last race with TotalEnergies as the title sponsor, with Ravenol replacing the former in the 2024 season.

== Entry list ==
No.	Entrant	Car	Class	Driver 1	Driver 2	Driver 3	Driver 4
SP 9 FIA GT3 (32 entries)
1	(Germany) Audi Sport Team Scherer PHX	Audi R8 LMS Evo II	P	(San Marino) Mattia Drudi	(Switzerland) Ricardo Feller	(Denmark) Dennis Lind	(Belgium) Frédéric Vervisch
2	(Germany) Mercedes-AMG Team GetSpeed	Mercedes-AMG GT3 Evo	P	(United Kingdom) Adam Christodoulou	(Germany) Maximilian Götz	(Germany) Fabian Schiller	
3	(Germany) Mercedes-AMG Team GetSpeed	Mercedes-AMG GT3 Evo	P	(Germany) Maro Engel	(Andorra) Jules Gounon	(Spain) Daniel Juncadella	
4	(Germany) Mercedes-AMG Team Bilstein by HRT	Mercedes-AMG GT3 Evo	P	(Switzerland) Philip Ellis	(Switzerland) Raffaele Marciello	(Switzerland) Edoardo Mortara	(Germany) Luca Stolz
5	(Germany) Scherer Sport PHX	Audi R8 LMS Evo II	P	(Germany) Vincent Kolb	(United Kingdom) Alexander Sims	(Germany) Frank Stippler	(Netherlands) Renger van der Zande
6	(Germany) Mercedes-AMG Team Bilstein by HRT	Mercedes-AMG GT3 Evo	PA	(Germany) Hubert Haupt	(Australia) Jordan Love	(India) Arjun Maini	
7	(Austria) Konrad Motorsport	Lamborghini Huracán GT3 Evo	P	(Netherlands) Yelmer Buurman	(Zimbabwe) Axcil Jefferies	(Bulgaria) Pavel Lefterov	(United States) Danny Soufi
10	(Germany) Schnitzelalm Racing	Mercedes-AMG GT3 Evo	PA	(Germany) Marek Böckmann	(Germany) Kenneth Heyer	(Germany) Marcel Marchewicz	(Germany) Luca-Sandro Trefz
11	(Germany) Schnitzelalm Racing	Mercedes-AMG GT3 Evo	PA	(Germany) Patrick Assenheimer	(Germany) Marek Böckmann	(Netherlands) Colin Caresani	(Germany) Marcel Marchewicz
16	(Germany) Scherer Sport PHX	Audi R8 LMS Evo II	P	(Italy) Michele Beretta	(Switzerland) Ricardo Feller	(Germany) Kim-Luis Schramm	(Germany) Markus Winkelhock
19	(Germany) racing one	Ferrari 296 GT3	PA	(Germany) Stefan Aust	(Germany) Christian Kohlhaas	(Germany) Luca Ludwig	(Germany) Johannes Stengel
20	(Germany) WTM by Rinaldi Racing	Ferrari 296 GT3	PA	(Netherlands) Indy Dontje	(Germany) Daniel Keilwitz	(Germany) Jochen Krumbach	(Germany) Leonard Weiss
22	(Germany) Audi Sport Team Car Collection	Audi R8 LMS Evo II	P	(Germany) Luca Engstler	(Austria) Max Hofer	(Belgium) Gilles Magnus	(Germany) Dennis Marschall
24	(Germany) Lionspeed by Car Collection Motorsport	Porsche 911 GT3 R (992)	P	(Australia) Matt Campbell	(France) Mathieu Jaminet	(Germany) Patrick Kolb	(France) Patrick Pilet
25	(Germany) Huber Motorsport	Porsche 911 GT3 R (992)	P	(France) Romain Dumas	(Germany) Dennis Fetzer	(Germany) Lars Kern	(France) Côme Ledogar
27	(Germany) ABT Sportsline	Lamborghini Huracán GT3 Evo 2	P	(South Africa) Kelvin van der Linde	(Italy) Marco Mapelli	(South Africa) Jordan Pepper	(Denmark) Nicki Thiim
28	(Germany) PROsport Racing	Aston Martin Vantage AMR GT3	PA	(Germany) Christoph Breuer	(Belgium) Maxime Dumarey	(United Kingdom) Ben Green	(Germany) Mike David Ortmann
30	(Germany) Frikadelli Racing Team	Ferrari 296 GT3	P	(New Zealand) Earl Bamber	(Netherlands) Nicky Catsburg	(Germany) Felipe Fernández Laser	(United Kingdom) David Pittard
33	(Germany) Falken Motorsports	Porsche 911 GT3 R (992)	P	(Austria) Klaus Bachler	(Germany) Sven Müller	(Belgium) Alessio Picariello	
39	(Germany) Audi Sport Team Land	Audi R8 LMS Evo II	P	(Germany) Christopher Haase	(Germany) Christopher Mies	(Switzerland) Patric Niederhauser	
40	(Germany) Audi Sport Team Scherer PHX	Audi R8 LMS Evo II	P	(Germany) Mike Rockenfeller	(Germany) Timo Scheider	(Germany) Martin Tomczyk	
44	(Germany) Falken Motorsports	Porsche 911 GT3 R (992)	P	(Sweden) Joel Eriksson	(Germany) Tim Heinemann	(Germany) Nico Menzel	(Austria) Martin Ragginger
54	(Italy) Dinamic GT	Porsche 911 GT3 R (992)	P	(Germany) Christian Engelhart	(Turkey) Ayhancan Güven	(Germany) Laurin Heinrich	(Belgium) Laurens Vanthoor
69	(Germany) Dörr Motorsport	Aston Martin Vantage AMR GT3	PA	(Germany) Ben Dörr	(Germany) Phil Dörr	(Germany) Peter Posavac	(United Kingdom) Darren Turner
72	(Germany) BMW Junior Team	BMW M4 GT3	P	(United Kingdom) Daniel Harper	(Germany) Max Hesse	(United States) Neil Verhagen	
96	(Germany) Rutronik Racing	Porsche 911 GT3 R (992)	P	(France) Julien Andlauer	(Italy) Matteo Cairoli	(Norway) Dennis Olsen	
98	(Germany) Rowe Racing	BMW M4 GT3	P	(Belgium) Maxime Martin	(South Africa) Sheldon van der Linde	(Belgium) Dries Vanthoor	(Germany) Marco Wittmann
99	(Germany) Rowe Racing	BMW M4 GT3	P	(Austria) Philipp Eng	(Brazil) Augusto Farfus	(United States) Connor De Phillippi	(United Kingdom) Nick Yelloly
100	(Germany) Walkenhorst Motorsport	BMW M4 GT3	PA	(Germany) Christian Bollrath	(Germany) Jörg Breuer	(Finland) Sami-Matti Trogen	(Germany) Henry Walkenhorst
101	(Germany) Walkenhorst Motorsport	BMW M4 GT3	P	(Poland) Kuba Giermaziak	(Norway) Christian Krognes	(Finland) Jesse Krohn	(Spain) Andy Soucek
102	(Germany) Walkenhorst Motorsport	BMW M4 GT3	P	(United Kingdom) Jake Dennis	(Germany) Jens Klingmann	(Norway) Christian Krognes	(France) Thomas Neubauer
911	(Germany) Manthey EMA	Porsche 911 GT3 R (992)	P	(Denmark) Michael Christensen	(France) Kévin Estre	(France) Frédéric Makowiecki	(Austria) Thomas Preining
SPX (2 entries)
46	(Germany) Mercedes-AMG Team HRT	Mercedes-AMG GT2		(United Kingdom) Frank Bird	(Germany) Elia Erhart	(Germany) Thomas Jäger	(Germany) Jörg Viebahn
222	(Germany) Schnitzelalm Racing	Mercedes-AMG GT2		(Canada) Mikaël Grenier	(Germany) Jay Mo Härtling	(United States) David Thilenius	(Germany) Moritz Wiskirchen
SP 10 – SRO GT4 (16 entries)
47	(Hong Kong) KCMG	Toyota GR Supra GT4 Evo		(Australia) Josh Burdon	(Italy) Edoardo Liberati	(Estonia) Martin Rump	
67	(Germany) Dörr Motorsport	Aston Martin Vantage AMR GT4		(Germany) Michael Funke	(France) Théo Nouet	(Germany) Sven Schädler	(Germany) Frank Weishar
68	(Germany) Dörr Motorsport	Aston Martin Vantage AMR GT4		(Germany) Finn Albig	(Germany) Olaf Hoppelshäuser	(Germany) Stefan Kenntemich	(Germany) Rolf Scheibner
70	(Germany) Toyo Tire with Ring Racing	Toyota GR Supra GT4		(Germany) Marc Hennerici	(Japan) Takayuki Kinoshita	(Germany) Tim Sandtler	(Germany) Heiko Tönges
71	(Germany) Toyo Tire with Ring Racing	Toyota GR Supra GT4		(Germany) Lance David Arnold	(Germany) Andreas Gülden	(Japan) Takayuki Kinoshita	(Germany) Michael Tischner
73	(Germany) BMW M Motorsport	BMW M4 GT4 Gen II		(United Kingdom) Jethro Bovingdon	(Germany) Christian Gebhardt	(Germany) Guido Naumann	(Germany) Jörg Weidinger
74	(Germany) Walkenhorst Motorsport	BMW M4 GT4 Gen II		(Belgium) Aris Balanian	(Belgium) Jarno D'Hauw	(Germany) Henry Walkenhorst	(Germany) Florian Weber
75	(Germany) Teichmann Racing	Toyota GR Supra GT4 Evo		(Germany) Roland Froese	(United Kingdom) Scott Marshall	(Germany) "Maximilian"	(Germany) Florian Naumann
76	(Germany) Teichmann Racing	Toyota GR Supra GT4 Evo		(Germany) Stephan Brodmerkel	(Germany) Phil Hill	(Austria) Constantin Schöll	(Germany) Hendrik Still
78	(Germany) PROsport Racing	Aston Martin Vantage AMR GT4		(Germany) Rudi Adams	(Belgium) Guido Dumarey	(Germany) Michael Hess	(Ukraine) Yevgen Sokolovsky
79	(Germany) PROsport Racing	Aston Martin Vantage AMR GT4		(Belgium) Guillaume Dumarey	(Germany) Alexander Mies	(Germany) Andreas Patzelt	(Germany) Hugo Sasse
86	(Germany) FK Performance Motorsport	BMW M4 GT4 Gen II		(Switzerland) Miklas Born	(Germany) Christian Konnerth	(Netherlands) Maxime Oosten	(Germany) Lorenz Stegmann
87	(Germany) FK Performance Motorsport	BMW M4 GT4 Gen II		(Germany) Nick Hancke	(Germany) Michael Schrey	(Germany) Thorsten Wolter	(Germany) Nick Wüstenhagen
88	(Germany) FK Performance Motorsport	BMW M4 GT4 Gen II		(Switzerland) Ranko Mijatovic	(New Zealand) Tony Richards	(Turkey) Hakan Sarı	(Turkey) Recep Sarı
89	(Germany) Haupt Racing Team	Mercedes-AMG GT4		(Germany) Alexander Kroker	(Germany) Reinhold Renger	(Germany) Tim-Florian Wahl	(Germany) Tobias Wahl
90	(Germany) Adrenalin Motorsport Team Motec	BMW M4 GT4		(Switzerland) Michelangelo Comazzi	(Germany) Nick Deißler	(Japan) Ryusho Konishi	(Germany) Florian Wolf
Cup2 Porsche 992 Cup (10 entries)
123	(Belgium) Mühlner Motorsport	Porsche 992 GT3 Cup	P	(United Kingdom) Alex Brundle	(Germany) Ben Bünnagel	(Germany) Tobias Müller	(Germany) Kai Riemer
124	(Belgium) Mühlner Motorsport	Porsche 992 GT3 Cup	P	(Germany) Thorsten Jung	(Germany) Michael Rebhan	(Germany) Nick Salewsky	(Germany) Tobias Vazquez
125	(Germany) Huber Motorsport	Porsche 992 GT3 Cup	P	(Germany) Ulrich Berg	(Germany) Christer Jöns	(Germany) Thomas Kiefer	(Germany) Hans Wehrmann
150	(Germany) RPM Racing	Porsche 992 GT3 Cup	Am	(Germany) Philip Hampecht	(Germany) Marco Holzer	(Sweden) Nic Jönsson	(United States) Tracy Krohn
160	(Germany) ADAC Sachsen e.V.	Porsche 992 GT3 Cup	Am	(Germany) Dominik Fugel	(Germany) Fidel Leib	(Germany) Benjamin Leuchter	(Germany) Moritz Oestreich
161	(Germany) KKrämer Racing	Porsche 992 GT3 Cup	Am	(Germany) Christopher Brück	(Germany) Karsten Krämer	(Germany) "Selv"	(Germany) Alexey Veremenko
162		Porsche 992 GT3 Cup	Am	(Germany) Ralf-Peter Bonk	(United Kingdom) Bill Cameron	(United Kingdom) Jim Cameron	
163	(Germany) KKrämer Racing	Porsche 992 GT3 Cup	P	(Germany) Michele Di Martino	(Germany) Moritz Kranz	(Germany) Herbert Lösch	(Germany) Noah Nagelsdiek
169	(Germany) Clickversicherung.de Team	Porsche 992 GT3 Cup	P	(Germany) Robin Chrzanowski	(Germany) Kersten Jodexnis	(Luxembourg) Dylan Pereira	(Germany) Peter Scharmach
170	(Germany) Black Falcon Team Identica	Porsche 992 GT3 Cup	Am	(Turkey) Mustafa Mehmet Kaya	(Italy) Gabriele Piana	(Luxembourg) Carlos Rivas	(Germany) Mike Stursberg
Cup3 Cayman GT4 Trophy (10 entries)
85		Porsche 718 Cayman GT4 RS Clubsport	Am	(United Kingdom) James Breakell	(New Zealand) Grant Dalton	(United Kingdom) Harley Haughton	(New Zealand) Grant Woolford
180	(Germany) Huber Racing	Porsche 718 Cayman GT4 RS Clubsport	Am	(Germany) David Kiefer	(Germany) Marius Kiefer	(Germany) Stefan Kiefer	(Austria) Luca Rettenbacher
181	(Germany) Team Mathol Racing	Porsche 718 Cayman GT4 RS Clubsport	Am	(United Kingdom) Peter Cate	(Germany) Alex Fielenbach	(Germany) Arno Klasen	(Switzerland) Rüdiger Schicht
182	(Germany) SRS Team Sorg Rennsport	Porsche 718 Cayman GT4 RS Clubsport	Am	(Germany) Heiko Eichenberg	(Germany) Fabio Grosse	(Germany) Patrik Grütter	
185	(Germany) SRS Team Sorg Rennsport	Porsche 718 Cayman GT4 RS Clubsport	Am	(Luxembourg) Jose Casares Garcia	(Netherlands) Milan Dontje	(United States) Dan Miller	(Germany) Carlo Scholl
186	(Germany) W&S Motorsport	Porsche 718 Cayman GT4 RS Clubsport	Am	(France) Sébastien Carcone	(Germany) Axel Duffner	(Luxembourg) Max Lamesch	(Germany) Jürgen Vöhringer
187	(Germany) W&S Motorsport	Porsche 718 Cayman GT4 RS Clubsport	Am	(Luxembourg) Daniel Bohr	(Germany) Heinz Dolfen	(United States) Andreas Gabler	(Germany) John Lee Schambony
188		Porsche 718 Cayman GT4 RS Clubsport	Am	(Germany) Leonard Oehme	(Germany) Moritz Oehme	(Germany) Niklas Oehme	(Germany) Ralf Oehme
189	(Germany) Black Falcon Team Textar	Porsche 718 Cayman GT4 RS Clubsport	Am	(Germany) Franz Engstler	(United States) Cabell Fisher	(Germany) Axel Sartingen	(Germany) Daniel Schwerfeld
190	(Germany) W&S Motorsport	Porsche 718 Cayman GT4 RS Clubsport	Am	(France) Sébastien Perrot	(Germany) Andreas Schaflitzl	(Switzerland) Guido Wirtz	
TCR Class (7 entries)
57		Opel Astra TCR		(France) Jean-Marc Finot	(France) Jean-Philippe Imparato	(Portugal) Carlos Tavares	(France) François Wales
66	(Germany) MSC Kempenich	Cupra León TCR		(Germany) Philipp Eis	(Germany) Torsten Kratz	(Germany) Meik Utsch	(Germany) Jens Wulf
816	(Germany) Scherer Sport PHX	Cupra León Competición TCR		(Germany) Stephan Epp	(Germany) Heiko Hammel	(Switzerland) Mathias Schläppi	(Switzerland) Frédéric Yerly
830	(South Korea) Hyundai Motorsport N	Hyundai Elantra N TCR		(Spain) Mikel Azcona	(Germany) Marc Basseng	(Germany) Manuel Lauck	
831	(South Korea) Hyundai Motorsport N	Hyundai Elantra N TCR		(United States) Mason Filippi	(United States) Harry Gottsacker	(United States) Taylor Hagler	(United States) Michael Lewis
834	(Germany) sharky-racing by MSC Sinzig e.V. im ADAC	Audi RS 3 LMS TCR (2017)		(Germany) Volker Garrn	(Armenia) Artur Goroyan	(Armenia) Roman Mavlanov (Note: Mavlanov is Russian, but competes under an Armenian licence as Russian national emblems were banned by the FIA due to the Russian invasion of Ukraine.)	(Switzerland) Jasmin Preisig
Other Classes
SP 8T (2 entries)
81	(Germany) Giti Tire Motorsport By WS Racing	BMW M4 GT4 Gen II		(United Kingdom) Pippa Mann	(France) Célia Martin	(Netherlands) Beitske Visser	(Liechtenstein) Fabienne Wohlwend
82	(Germany) Giti Tire Motorsport By WS Racing	BMW M4 GT4		(China) Rainey He	(Hong Kong) Sunny Wong	(Hong Kong) Andy Yan	
SP 7 (3 entries)
13		Porsche 991 GT3 II Cup		(Germany) Bernd Albrecht	(Germany) Kurt Ecke	(Germany) Steffen Schlichenmeier	(Germany) Andreas Sczepansky
151	(Germany) RPM Racing	Porsche 991 GT3 II Cup		(Germany) Tim Breidbach	(South Korea) Choi Jang-han	(Czech Republic) Milan Kodidek	(Belgium) Kris Cools
184	(Germany) KKrämer Racing	Porsche Cayman GT4 Clubsport		(Germany) Olaf Baunack	(Germany) Mario Handrick	(Germany) Karl Heinz Meyer	(Germany) Jan Boris Schmäing
SP 6 (2 entries)
152	(Germany) RPM Racing	Porsche 991 GT3 I Cup		(Germany) Michael Czyborra	(Netherlands) Duncan Huisman	(Netherlands) Patrick Huisman	
153	(Switzerland) Hofor Racing	BMW M3 E46 GTR		(Switzerland) Martin Kroll	(Switzerland) Michael Kroll	(Germany) Bernd Küpper	(Switzerland) Alexander Prinz
SP 4T (3 entries)
114	(Japan) Subaru Tecnica International	Subaru WRX S4		(Netherlands) Carlo van Dam	(Japan) Takuto Iguchi	(Germany) Tim Schrick	(Japan) Hideki Yamauchi
115	(Belgium) KGL AMC St. Vith	Porsche 718 Cayman GT4 Clubsport		(Italy) Bruno Barbaro	(Belgium) Philippe Broodcooren	(Belgium) Tom Cloet	(Belgium) Jacques Derenne
718	(Germany) Smyrlis Racing	Porsche 718 Cayman GT4 Clubsport		(Germany) Guido Heinrich	(Germany) Fabian Peitzmeier	(Germany) Christopher Rink	(Germany) Ioannis Smyrlis
SP 3 (4 entries)
118	(Germany) Ollis Garage	Dacia Logan		(Germany) Thomas Geile	(Germany) Oliver Kriese	(Germany) Michael Lachmeyer	(Germany) Maximilian Weissermel
119	Toyota Gazoo Racing Team Thailand	Toyota Corolla Altis GT N24		(Thailand) Nattavude Charoensukhawatana	(Thailand) Nattapong Hortongkum	(Thailand) Manat Kulapalanont	(Thailand) Suttipong Smittachartch
120	Toyota Gazoo Racing Team Thailand	Toyota Corolla Altis GT N24		(Taiwan) Chen Jian Hong	(Japan) Naoki Kawamura	(Thailand) Grant Supaphongs	(Thailand) Kris Vasuratna
121	(Germany) Automobilclub von Deutschland	Opel Manta (Flying Fox) GT		(Germany) Hans-Olaf Beckmann	(Germany) Peter Hass	(Germany) Jürgen Schulten	(Germany) Volker Strycek
SP 3T (4 entries)
108	(Germany) sharky-racing by MSC Sinzig e.V. im ADAC	Volkswagen Golf GTI TCR		(Germany) Richard Jodexnis	(Germany) Knut Kluge	(Germany) Joris Primke	(Germany) Ralf Weiner
109	(Germany) MSC Sinzig e.V. im ADAC	Audi TTS		(Germany) Arndt Hallmanns	(Germany) Wolfgang Haugg	(Germany) Peter Muggianu	(Germany) Roland Waschkau
110	(Germany) Max Kruse Racing	Volkswagen Golf GTI TCR		(Turkey) Emir Asari	(France) Benjamin Cartery	(Germany) Max Partl	(Germany) Matthias Wasel
112	(Germany) Bulldog Racing	MINI John Cooper Works GP		(Germany) Danny Brink	(Austria) Markus Fischer	(Germany) Uwe Krumscheid	(Germany) Marco Zabel
V6 (5 entries)
91		Porsche 911 Carrera		(Germany) Alexander Köppen	(Germany) Jacek Pydys	(Germany) Sebastian Rings	
396	(Germany) Adrenalin Motorsport Team Motec	Porsche Cayman S		(Spain) Carlos Arimón	(Germany) Christian Büllesbach	(Germany) Jürgen Nett	(Germany) Andreas Schettler
561		Porsche Cayman GTS		(Germany) David Ackermann	(Germany) Holger Gachot	(Germany) Axel Jahn	(Germany) Bernd Kleeschulte
562	(Germany) Schmickler Performance powered by Ravenol	Porsche 911 Carrera		(Germany) Albert Egbert	(Germany) Christian Heuchemer	(Germany) Thomas Heuchemer	(Germany) Sascha Kloft
563	(Germany) SRS Team Sorg Rennsport	Porsche Cayman S		(Germany) Heinz Jürgen Kroner	(Mexico) Xavier Lamadrid Jr.	(Mexico) Xavier Lamadrid Sr.	(Italy) Ugo Vicenzi
V5 (2 entries)
444	(Germany) Adrenalin Motorsport Team Motec	Porsche Cayman CM12		(Germany) Joachim Nett	(Germany) Daniel Korn	(Germany) Tobias Korn	(Germany) Ulrich Korn
551	(Germany) Schmickler Performance powered by Ravenol	Porsche Cayman CM12		(Germany) Frank Nikolaus	(Germany) Christoph Ruhrmann	(Germany) Joachim Schulz	(Germany) Manfred Weber
V4 (3 entries)
540	(Germany) QTQ-Raceperformance	BMW 328i L		(Germany) Oliver Frisse	(Germany) Jürgen Huber	(Germany) Christian Knötschke	(Germany) Simon Sagmeister
541		BMW 325i		(Germany) Henning Hausmeier	(Germany) Desiree Müller	(Germany) Philipp Romboy	(Germany) Marcel Unland
542		BMW 325i		(Germany) Anton Bauer	(Sweden) Dan Berghult	(Germany) Meik ter Haar	(United Kingdom) Ben Lyons
VT3 (1 entry)
300	(Germany) Team Mathol Racing	Porsche Cayman S CB12		(Germany) Thorsten Held	(Germany) Matthias Trinius	(Sweden) Eric Ullström	(Argentina) Marcos Adolfo Vázquez
VT2 (17 entries)
55		Opel Astra GTC	VTF	(Germany) Lars Füting	(Germany) Christian Gatterer	(Germany) Tobias Jung	(Germany) Tim Robertz
56		Opel Astra GTC	VTF	(Germany) Michael Eichhorn	(Germany) Daniel Jenichen	(United States) Tony Roma	(Germany) Andreas Winterwerber
65	(Germany) MSC Kempenich	Volkswagen Scirocco R TSI	VTF	(Germany) Niklas Ehrhardt	(Germany) Thomas Ehrhardt	(Brazil) Flavia Pellegrino Fernandes	(Germany) Roman Schiemenz
83	(Germany) Giti Tire Motorsport By WS Racing	BMW 330i Racing	VTH	(Germany) Lukas Drost	(Germany) Matthias Möller	(New Zealand) Wayne Moore	(Germany) Fabian Pirrone
84	(Germany) Giti Tire Motorsport By WS Racing	Volkswagen Scirocco	VTF	(Germany) Robert Hinzer	(Germany) Niklas Kry	(Germany) Ulrich Schmidt	(Germany) Andrei Sidorenko
111		Volkswagen Scirocco R TSI	VTF	(Switzerland) Peter Baumann	(Germany) Kevin Olaf Rost	(Germany) Olaf Rost	(Germany) Sebastian Schemmann
126	(Germany) Bulldog Racing	MINI John Cooper Works GP	VTF	(United Kingdom) Charles Cooper	(Germany) Christoph Kragenings	(Germany) Michael Mönch	(Germany) Sebastian Sauerbrei
330	(Germany) Adrenalin Motorsport Team Motec	BMW 330i Racing	VTH	(Germany) Jacob Erlbacher	(Germany) Philipp Leisen	(Germany) Oskar Sandberg	(Germany) Daniel Zils
331	(Germany) Adrenalin Motorsport Team Motec	BMW 330i Racing	VTH	(Germany) Klaus Faßbender	(Germany) Thomas Jühlen	(Switzerland) Michael Lüthi	(Germany) Andreas Winkler
522	(Germany) SRS Team Sorg Rennsport	BMW 330i Racing	VTH	(Germany) Christian Leukers	(Netherlands) Piet-Jan Ooms	(Germany) Björn Simon	(Germany) Hans Joachim Theiß
524	(Germany) SRS Team Sorg Rennsport	BMW 128ti	VTF	(Italy) Alberto Carobbio	(Germany) Kurt Strube	(Germany) Bernhard Wagner	(Germany) Alex Wright
525	(South Korea) Hyundai Driving Experience	Hyundai i30 Fastback N	VTF	(Germany) Jens Dralle	(South Korea) Kang Byung-hui	(South Korea) Park June-sung	(United States) Jeff Ricca
526	(Germany) QTQ-Raceperformance	BMW 330i Racing	VTH	(Germany) Florian Ebener	(Germany) Maximilian Kurz	(Germany) Riccardo Petrolo	(Germany) Florian Quante
527	(South Korea) Hyundai Driving Experience	Hyundai i30 Fastback N	VTF	(Germany) Michael Bohrer	(Germany) Gerrit Holthaus	(Germany) Tobias Overbeck	(Germany) Marcus Willhardt
531	(Germany) MSG Bayerischer Wald Hutthurm e.V. im ADAC	BMW 328i Racing	VTH	(Romania) Minhea Birisan	(Germany) Jörg Schönfelder	(Romania) Alexandru Vasilescu	(Germany) Serge Van Vooren
533	(Germany) Zierau Hochvolt by Mertens Motorsport	Hyundai i30 Fastback N	VTF	(Germany) Norbert Fischer	(Germany) Daniel Mertens	(Germany) Stephan Schroers	(Germany) Felix Schumann
535	(Germany) Manheller Racing	BMW 328i Racing	VTH	(Germany) Maximilian von Görtz	(Germany) Marcel Manheller	(United Kingdom) Martin Owen	(Japan) Yutaka Seki
AT (4 entries)
227	(Germany) Griesemann Gruppe by TR Team	Toyota GR Supra GT4 Evo		(Germany) Dirk Adorf	(Germany) Björn Griesemann	(Germany) Georg Griesemann	(Germany) Felix von der Laden
320	(Germany) Four Motors Bioconcept-Car	Porsche 991 GT3 II Cup		(Denmark) Henrik Bollerslev	(Germany) Thomas Kiefer	(Germany) Thomas von Löwis of Menar	(Germany) "Smudo"
420	(Germany) Four Motors Bioconcept-Car	Porsche 718 Cayman GT4 Clubsport		(Germany) Matthias Beckwermert	(Germany) Karl Pflanz	(Netherlands) Marco van Ramshorst	(Germany) Oliver Sprungmann
633	(Germany) Four Motors Bioconcept-Car	Porsche 718 Cayman GT4 Clubsport		(Germany) Henning Cramer	(Germany) Christoph Hewer	(Switzerland) Marc Schöni	(Switzerland) Marco Timbal
M240i (8 entries)
240		BMW M240i Racing		(Germany) Martin Heidrich	(Germany) Lucas Lange	(Germany) Sascha Lott	(Germany) Dirk Volmer
241		BMW M240i Racing		(Germany) Alexander Meixner	(Thailand) Kiki Sak Nana	(Germany) Markus Nölken	
242	(Germany) Adrenalin Motorsport Team Motec	BMW M240i Racing		(Germany) Thomas Ardelt	(Germany) Manuel Dormagen	(Germany) Sven Oepen	
243	(Germany) Adrenalin Motorsport Team Motec	BMW M240i Racing		(Germany) Michel Albers	(Germany) Marco Büsker	(Germany) Marvin Marino	(Germany) Aaron Wenisch
244	(Germany) Schnitzelalm Racing	BMW M240i Racing		(Germany) Jay Mo Härtling	(Germany) Timo Kieslich	(Germany) Tim Neuser	(Germany) Charlotte Wilking
245		BMW M240i Racing		(Austria) Michael Fischer	(Switzerland) Dominic Kulpowicz	(Germany) Kevin Wambach	(Germany) Benno Zerlin
246	(Germany) Adrenalin Motorsport Team Motec	BMW M240i Racing		(Germany) Yannick Fübrich	(Germany) Stefan Kruse	(Germany) Sven Markert	(Germany) Nils Steinberg
247	(Germany) Adrenalin Motorsport Team Motec	BMW M240i Racing		(Germany) Simon Klemund	(Germany) Christian Kraus	(Germany) Laura Luft	(Mexico) Luis Ramírez

Icon	Class
GT3 entries
P	SP9 GT3-Pro
PA	SP9 GT3 Pro-Am
992 entries
Icon	Class
P	Cup 2-Pro
Am	Cup 2-Am
Cayman GT4 entries
Icon	Class
P	Cup 3-Pro
Am	Cup 3-Am
VT2 Production entries
VTF	VT2 Front
VTH	VT2 Hecka

== Qualifying ==
=== Top Qualifying / Starting Group 1 ===
Pos.	Class	No.	Team	Car	Fastest lap from Qualifying 1, 2 and 3	Top Qualifying 1	Top Qualifying 2
1	SP 9 Pro	4	(Germany) Mercedes-AMG Team Bilstein by HRT	Mercedes-AMG GT3 Evo	8:15.779		8:09.058
2	SP 9 Pro	3	(Germany) Mercedes-AMG Team GetSpeed	Mercedes-AMG GT3 Evo	8:14.325		8:09.480
3	SP 9 Pro	27	(Germany) ABT Sportsline	Lamborghini Huracán GT3 Evo 2	8:13.696		8:10:498
4	SP 9 Pro	30	(Germany) Frikadelli Racing Team	Ferrari 296 GT3	8:14.243		8:10.518
5	SP 9 Pro	5	(Germany) Scherer Sport PHX	Audi R8 LMS Evo II	8:13.467	8:10.602	8:11.024
6	SP 9 Pro	44	(Germany) Falken Motorsports	Porsche 911 GT3 R (992)	8:17.431		8:11.211
7	SP 9 Pro-Am	6	(Germany) Mercedes-AMG Team Bilstein by HRT	Mercedes-AMG GT3 Evo	8:14.133		8:11.311
8	SP 9 Pro	1	(Germany) Audi Sport Team Scherer PHX	Audi R8 LMS Evo II	8:15.301	8:11.687	8:11.643
9	SP 9 Pro	16	(Germany) Scherer Sport PHX	Audi R8 LMS Evo II	8:14.971	8:10.046	8:11.708
10	SP 9 Pro	2	(Germany) Mercedes-AMG Team GetSpeed	Mercedes-AMG GT3 Evo	8:13.691	8:11.267	8:11.824
11	SP 9 Pro	99	(Germany) Rowe Racing	BMW M4 GT3	8:16.075		8:11.921
12	SP 9 Pro	24	(Germany) Lionspeed by Car Collection Motorsport	Porsche 911 GT3 R (992)	8:16.925		8:12.257
13	SP 9 Pro-Am	10	(Germany) Schnitzelalm Racing	Mercedes-AMG GT3 Evo	8:17.295		8:12.504
14	SP 9 Pro	33	(Germany) Falken Motorsports	Porsche 911 GT3 R (992)	8:15.893		8:12.599
15	SP 9 Pro-Am	20	(Germany) WTM by Rinaldi Racing	Ferrari 296 GT3	8:14.702	8:11.023	8:13.000
16	SP 9 Pro	39	(Germany) Audi Sport Team Land	Audi R8 LMS Evo II	8:17.267		8:13.001
17	SP 9 Pro	72	(Germany) BMW Junior Team	BMW M4 GT3	8:16.884		8:13.384
18	SP 9 Pro-Am	11	(Germany) Schnitzelalm Racing	Mercedes-AMG GT3 Evo	8:16.609		8:13.780
19	SP 9 Pro-Am	100	(Germany) Walkenhorst Motorsport	BMW M4 GT3	8:21.293		8:17.297
20	SP 9 Pro	911	(Germany) Manthey EMA	Porsche 911 GT3 R (992)	8:13.469	8:11.721	
21	SP 9 Pro	96	(Germany) Rutronik Racing	Porsche 911 GT3 R (992)	8:15.244	8:12.583	
22	SP 9 Pro	22	(Germany) Audi Sport Team Car Collection	Audi R8 LMS Evo II	8:17.291	8:14.313	
23	SP 9 Pro	54	(Italy) Dinamic GT	Porsche 911 GT3 R (992)	8:15.495	8:14.391	
24	SP 9 Pro-Am	28	(Germany) PROsport Racing	Aston Martin Vantage AMR GT3	8:15.496	8:16.077	
25	SP 9 Pro	7	(Austria) Konrad Motorsport	Lamborghini Huracán GT3 Evo	8:17.877	8:16.147	
26	SP 9 Pro	25	(Germany) Huber Motorsport	Porsche 911 GT3 R (992)	8:19.055	8:16.562	
27	SP 9 Pro	101	(Germany) Walkenhorst Motorsport	BMW M4 GT3	8:16.131	8:17.595	
28	SP 9 Pro	40	(Germany) Audi Sport Team Scherer PHX	Audi R8 LMS Evo II	8:16.780	8:18.733	
29	SP 9 Pro-Am	19	(Germany) racing one	Ferrari 296 GT3	8:12.443	8:20.512	
30	SP 9 Pro-Am	69	(Germany) Dörr Motorsport	Aston Martin Vantage AMR GT3	8:19.461	8:21.789	
31	SP 9 Pro	98	(Germany) Rowe Racing	BMW M4 GT3	8:15.834	8:32.698	
32	SP 9 Pro	102	(Germany) Walkenhorst Motorsport	BMW M4 GT3	8:16.254	No time	

=== Starting Group 2 ===
Pos.	Class	No.	Team	Car	Fastest lap from Qualifying 1, 2 and 3	Top Qualifying 1
1	SP-X	46	(Germany) Mercedes-AMG Team HRT	Mercedes-AMG GT2	8:32.601	8:30.685
2	Cup2 Pro	123	(Belgium) Mühlner Motorsport	Porsche 992 GT3 Cup	8:29.437	
3	Cup2 Pro	169	(Germany) Clickversicherung.de Team	Porsche 992 GT3 Cup	8:29.563	
4	Cup2 Am	170	(Germany) Black Falcon Team Identica	Porsche 992 GT3 Cup	8:30.612	
5	Cup2 Pro	163	(Germany) KKrämer Racing	Porsche 992 GT3 Cup	8:33.313	
6	SP-X	222	(Germany) Schnitzelalm Racing	Mercedes-AMG GT2	8:27.063	8:25.745 (Note: The #222 Schnitzelalm Racing received a 5-place grid penalty for non-respect of flag signals.)
7	Cup2 Am	161	(Germany) KKrämer Racing	Porsche 992 GT3 Cup	8:34.037	
8	Cup2 Am	150	(Germany) RPM Racing	Porsche 992 GT3 Cup	8:34.104	
9	Cup2 Am	160	(Germany) ADAC Sachsen e.V.	Porsche 992 GT3 Cup	8:37.288	
10	Cup2 Pro	125	(Germany) Huber Motorsport	Porsche 992 GT3 Cup	8:41.019	
11	Cup2 Pro	124	(Belgium) Mühlner Motorsport	Porsche 992 GT3 Cup	8:41.905	
12	AT	320	(Germany) Four Motors Bioconcept-Car	Porsche 991 GT3 II Cup	8:43.455	
13	SP 10	67	(Germany) Dörr Motorsport	Aston Martin Vantage AMR GT4	8:53.993	
14	SP 10	86	(Germany) FK Performance Motorsport	BMW M4 GT4 Gen II	8:55.251	
15	SP 10	71	(Germany) Toyo Tire with Ring Racing	Toyota GR Supra GT4	8:55.618	
16	Cup3 Am	182	(Germany) SRS Team Sorg Rennsport	Porsche 718 Cayman GT4 RS Clubsport	8:56.194	
17	SP 10	74	(Germany) Walkenhorst Motorsport	BMW M4 GT4 Gen II	8:56.391	
18	SP 10	47	(Hong Kong) KCMG	Toyota GR Supra GT4 Evo	8:56.687	
19	TCR	831	(South Korea) Hyundai Motorsport N	Hyundai Elantra N TCR	9:00.290	
20	SP 10	75	(Germany) Teichmann Racing	Toyota GR Supra GT4 Evo	9:00.594	
21	SP 10	76	(Germany) Teichmann Racing	Toyota GR Supra GT4 Evo	9:00.846	
22	TCR	830	(South Korea) Hyundai Motorsport N	Hyundai Elantra N TCR	8:56.371 (Note: The #830 Hyundai Motorsport N received a 5-place grid penalty for causing a collision with #227 Griesemann Gruppe by TR Team and non-respect of flag signals.)	
23	SP 10	89	(Germany) Haupt Racing Team	Mercedes-AMG GT4	9:03.119	
24	TCR	816	(Germany) Scherer Sport PHX	Cupra León Competición TCR	9:03.481	
25	Cup3 Am	180	(Germany) Huber Racing	Porsche 718 Cayman GT4 RS Clubsport	9:04.420	
26	SP 10	87	(Germany) FK Performance Motorsport	BMW M4 GT4 Gen II	8:57.919 (Note: The #87 FK Performance Motorsport received a 5-place grid penalty for non-respect of flag signals.)	
27	SP 10	79	(Germany) PROsport Racing	Aston Martin Vantage AMR GT4	9:05.335	
28	SP 10	88	(Germany) FK Performance Motorsport	BMW M4 GT4 Gen II	9:05.546	
29	Cup3 Am	85		Porsche 718 Cayman GT4 RS Clubsport	9:06.530	
30	SP 10	70	(Germany) Toyo Tire with Ring Racing	Toyota GR Supra GT4	9:07.911	
31	SP 7	151	(Germany) RPM Racing	Porsche 991 GT3 II Cup	9:08.800	
32	Cup2 Am	162		Porsche 992 GT3 Cup	9:10.810	
33	AT	420	(Germany) Four Motors Bioconcept-Car	Porsche 718 Cayman GT4 Clubsport	9:12.405	
34	Cup3 Am	189	(Germany) Black Falcon Team Textar	Porsche 718 Cayman GT4 RS Clubsport	9:13.265	
35	SP 7	13		Porsche 991 GT3 II Cup	9:13.972	
36	SP 10	90	(Germany) Adrenalin Motorsport Team Motec	BMW M4 GT4	9:14.682	
37	AT	227	(Germany) Griesemann Gruppe by TR Team	Toyota GR Supra GT4 Evo	9:15.135	
38	Cup3 Am	187	(Germany) W&S Motorsport	Porsche 718 Cayman GT4 RS Clubsport	9:20.138	
39	SP 10	78	(Germany) PROsport Racing	Aston Martin Vantage AMR GT4	9:20.218	
40	Cup3 Am	188		Porsche 718 Cayman GT4 RS Clubsport	9:20.563	
41	SP 8T	82	(Germany) Giti Tire Motorsport By WS Racing	BMW M4 GT4	9:26.716	
42	Cup3 Am	186	(Germany) W&S Motorsport	Porsche 718 Cayman GT4 RS Clubsport	9:27.197	
43	SP 10	68	(Germany) Dörr Motorsport	Aston Martin Vantage AMR GT4	9:16.919 (Note: The #68 Dörr Motorsport received a 5-place grid penalty for non-respect of flag signals.)	
44	Cup3 Am	190	(Germany) W&S Motorsport	Porsche 718 Cayman GT4 RS Clubsport	9:27.862	
45	Cup3 Am	185	(Germany) SRS Team Sorg Rennsport	Porsche 718 Cayman GT4 RS Clubsport	9:29.365	
46	TCR	66	(Germany) MSC Kempenich	Cupra León TCR	9:34.679	
47	SP 7	184	(Germany) KKrämer Racing	Porsche Cayman GT4 Clubsport	9:34.806	
48	AT	633	(Germany) Four Motors Bioconcept-Car	Porsche Cayman GT4 Clubsport	9:39.478	
49	TCR	834	(Germany) sharky-racing by MSC Sinzig e.V. im ADAC	Audi RS 3 LMS TCR (2017)	9:43.563	
50	TCR	57		Opel Astra TCR	10:09.560	
51	SP 8T	81	(Germany) Giti Tire Motorsport By WS Racing	BMW M4 GT4 Gen II	9:03.442 (Note: The #81 Giti Tire Motorsport By WS Racing was required to start the race from the back of the starting group for non-respect of flag signals exceeding the speed limit.)	
-	SP 10	73	(Germany) BMW M Motorsport	BMW M4 GT4 Gen II	9:08.024 (Note: The #73 BMW M Motorsport was required to start the race from pit lane after the starting group and received 2-minutes race penalty for repeated non-respect of flag signals exceeding the speed limit.)	
-	Cup3 Am	181	(Germany) Team Mathol Racing	Porsche 718 Cayman GT4 RS Clubsport	9:17.230 (Note: The #181 Team Mathol Racing was required to start the race from pit lane after the starting group and received 2-minutes race penalty for severe non-respect of flag signals exceeding the speed limit.)	

=== Starting Group 3 ===
Pos.	Class	No.	Team	Car	Fastest lap from Qualifying 1, 2 and 3
1	SP 4T	114	(Japan) Subaru Tecnica International	Subaru WRX S4	8:56.622
2	SP 6	152	(Germany) RPM Racing	Porsche 991 GT3 I Cup	8:58.371
3	SP 6	153	(Switzerland) Hofor Racing	BMW M3 E46 GTR	9:23.816
4	SP 3T	109	(Germany) MSC Sinzig e.V. im ADAC	Audi TTS	9:26.134
5	VT3	300	(Germany) Team Mathol Racing	Porsche Cayman S CB12	9:29.333
6	M240i	246	(Germany) Adrenalin Motorsport Team Motec	BMW M240i Racing	9:30.821
7	SP 3T	110	(Germany) Max Kruse Racing	Volkswagen Golf GTI TCR	9:32.445
8	V6	562	(Germany) Schmickler Performance powered by Ravenol	Porsche 911 Carrera	9:37.704
9	M240i	245		BMW M240i Racing	9:37.802
10	SP 4T	718	(Germany) Smyrlis Racing	Porsche 718 Cayman GT4 Clubsport	9:39.280
11	VT2 Hecka	330	(Germany) Adrenalin Motorsport Team Motec	BMW 330i Racing	9:42.698
12	V6	396	(Germany) Adrenalin Motorsport Team Motec	Porsche Cayman S	9:44.235
13	M240i	243	(Germany) Adrenalin Motorsport Team Motec	BMW M240i Racing	9:44.389
14	VT2 Front	527	(South Korea) Hyundai Driving Experience	Hyundai i30 Fastback N	9:44.536
15	M240i	241		BMW M240i Racing	9:45.491
16	VT2 Front	525	(South Korea) Hyundai Driving Experience	Hyundai i30 Fastback N	9:50.108
17	VT2 Front	533	(Germany) Zierau Hochvolt by Mertens Motorsport	Hyundai i30 Fastback N	9:51.658
18	V6	91		Porsche 911 Carrera	9:51.728
19	M240i	242	(Germany) Adrenalin Motorsport Team Motec	BMW M240i Racing	9:53.929
20	VT2 Hecka	526	(Germany) QTQ-Raceperformance	BMW 330i Racing	9:54.953
21	VT2 Hecka	535	(Germany) Manheller Racing	BMW 328i Racing	9:56.523
22	VT2 Hecka	522	(Germany) SRS Team Sorg Rennsport	BMW 330i Racing	10:00.432
23	SP 3	121	(Germany) Automobilclub von Deutschland	Opel Manta (Flying Fox) GT	10:03.244
24	M240i	247	(Germany) Adrenalin Motorsport Team Motec	BMW M240i Racing	10:05.183
25	SP 3T	112	(Germany) Bulldog Racing	MINI John Cooper Works GP	10:06.756
26	V5	444	(Germany) Adrenalin Motorsport Team Motec	Porsche Cayman CM12	10:08.286
27	VT2 Hecka	331	(Germany) Adrenalin Motorsport Team Motec	BMW 330i Racing	10:08.933
28	SP 3	119	Toyota Gazoo Racing Team Thailand	Toyota Corolla Altis GT N24	10:09.810
29	VT2 Front	111		Volkswagen Scirocco R TSI	10:14.762
30	M240i	240		BMW M240i Racing	10:20.131
31	V4	540	(Germany) QTQ-Raceperformance	BMW 328i L	10:23.195
32	V6	561		Porsche Cayman GTS	10:23.386
33	VT2 Front	84	(Germany) Giti Tire Motorsport By WS Racing	Volkswagen Scirocco	10:23.903
34	VT2 Front	56		Opel Astra GTC	10:24.309
35	VT2 Front	65	(Germany) MSC Kempenich	Volkswagen Scirocco R TSI	10:16.913 (Note: The #65 MSC Kempenich received a 5-place grid penalty for non-respect of flag signals.)
36	SP 3	120	Toyota Gazoo Racing Team Thailand	Toyota Corolla Altis GT N24	10:25.199
37	V4	541		BMW 325i	10:27.002
38	V6	563	(Germany) SRS Team Sorg Rennsport	Porsche Cayman S	10:31.754
39	SP 3T	108	(Germany) sharky-racing by MSC Sinzig e.V. im ADAC	Volkswagen Golf GTI TCR	10:34.568
40	V5	551	(Germany) Schmickler Performance powered by Ravenol	Porsche Cayman CM12	10:37.011
41	VT2 Front	524	(Germany) SRS Team Sorg Rennsport	BMW 128ti	10:37.728
42	VT2 Front	126	(Germany) Bulldog Racing	MINI John Cooper Works GP	10:37.787
43	VT2 Hecka	83	(Germany) Giti Tire Motorsport By WS Racing	BMW 330i Racing	10:43.425
44	VT2 Hecka	55		Opel Astra GTC	10:45.536
45	V4	542		BMW 325i	10:50.672
46	SP 3	118	(Germany) Ollis Garage	Dacia Logan	11:39.551
47	VT2 Hecka	531	(Germany) MSG Bayerischer Wald Hutthurm e.V. im ADAC	BMW 328i Racing	10:33.260 (Note: The #531 MSG Bayerischer Wald Hutthurm e.V. im ADAC was required to start the race from the back of the starting group for non-respect of flag signals exceeding the speed limit.)
-	SP 4T	115	(Belgium) KGL AMC St. Vith	Porsche 718 Cayman GT4 Clubsport	9:43.094 (Note: The #115 KGL AMC St. Vith was required to start the race from pit lane after the starting group and received 3-minutes race penalty for breach of Article 1 of Appendix 1 of DMSB Circuit Regulations and Article 28 of Supplementary Regulations. Driver Bruno Barbaro was also disqualified from the event.)

== Race result ==
- Entries in **bold** are class winners.
- Drivers in italics were entered in cars that completed the race, however did not complete the required 15 laps to be classified as a finisher.
- The minimum number of laps for classification at the finish (50 per cent of the overall race winner's distance) was 81 laps.

Pos	Class	No	Team/Entrant	Drivers	Vehicle	Laps	Time/Retired
1	**SP 9 Pro**	**30**	**(Germany) Frikadelli Racing Team**	**(New Zealand) Earl Bamber** **(Netherlands) Nicky Catsburg** **(Germany) Felipe Fernández Laser** **(United Kingdom) David Pittard**	**Ferrari 296 GT3**	**162**	**24:07:08.538**
2	SP 9 Pro	98	(Germany) ROWE Racing	(South Africa) Sheldon van der Linde (Belgium) Maxime Martin (Belgium) Dries Vanthoor (Germany) Marco Wittmann	BMW M4 GT3	162	+26.911
3	SP 9 Pro	4	(Germany) Mercedes-AMG Team Bilstein by HRT	(Switzerland) Philip Ellis (Switzerland) Raffaele Marciello (Germany) Luca Stolz (Switzerland) Edoardo Mortara (Note: Edoardo Mortara was an entered driver in the No. 4 Mercedes-AMG Team Bilstein car, but was withdrawn during the race having driven 8 laps early on. He was not credited with the third-place finish.)	Mercedes-AMG GT3 Evo	162	+1:44.311
4	SP 9 Pro	2	(Germany) Mercedes-AMG Team GetSpeed	(United Kingdom) Adam Christodoulou (Germany) Maximilian Götz (Germany) Fabian Schiller	Mercedes-AMG GT3 Evo	162	+2:30.811
5	SP 9 Pro	96	(Germany) Rutronik Racing	(France) Julien Andlauer (Italy) Matteo Cairoli (Norway) Dennis Olsen	Porsche 911 GT3 R (992)	162	+7:38.378
6	SP 9 Pro	39	(Germany) Audi Sport Team Land	(Germany) Christopher Haase (Germany) Christopher Mies (Switzerland) Patric Niederhauser	Audi R8 LMS Evo II	161	+1 Lap
7	**SP 9 Pro-Am**	**20**	**(Germany) WTM by Rinaldi Racing**	**(Netherlands) Indy Dontje** **(Germany) Daniel Keilwitz** **(Germany) Jochen Krumbach** **(Germany) Leonard Weiss**	**Ferrari 296 GT3**	**161**	**+1 Lap**
8	SP 9 Pro-Am	6	(Germany) Mercedes-AMG Team Bilstein by HRT	(Germany) Hubert Haupt (Australia) Jordan Love (India) Arjun Maini	Mercedes-AMG GT3 Evo	161	+1 Lap
9	SP 9 Pro	27	(Germany) ABT Sportsline	(South Africa) Kelvin van der Linde (Italy) Marco Mapelli (South Africa) Jordan Pepper (Denmark) Nicki Thiim	Lamborghini Huracán GT3 Evo 2	160	+2 Laps
10	SP 9 Pro	44	(Germany) Falken Motorsports	(Sweden) Joel Eriksson (Germany) Tim Heinemann (Germany) Nico Menzel (Austria) Martin Ragginger	Porsche 911 GT3 R (992)	160	+2 Laps
11	SP 9 Pro	16	(Germany) Scherer Sport PHX	(Italy) Michele Beretta (Switzerland) Ricardo Feller (Germany) Kim-Luis Schramm (Germany) Markus Winkelhock	Audi R8 LMS Evo II	160	+2 Laps
12	SP 9 Pro	40	(Germany) Audi Sport Team Scherer PHX	(Germany) Mike Rockenfeller (Germany) Timo Scheider (Germany) Martin Tomczyk	Audi R8 LMS Evo II	160	+2 Laps
13	SP 9 Pro	22	(Germany) Audi Sport Team Car Collection	(Germany) Luca Engstler (Austria) Max Hofer (Belgium) Gilles Magnus (Germany) Dennis Marschall	Audi R8 LMS Evo II	159	+3 Laps
14	SP 9 Pro-Am	28	(Germany) PROsport Racing	(Germany) Christoph Breuer (Belgium) Maxime Dumarey (United Kingdom) Ben Green (Germany) Mike David Ortmann	Aston Martin Vantage AMR GT3	158	+4 Laps
15	SP 9 Pro-Am	19	(Germany) racing one	(Germany) Stefan Aust (Germany) Christian Kohlhaas (Germany) Luca Ludwig (Germany) Johannes Stengel	Ferrari 296 GT3	155	+7 Laps
16	SP 9 Pro-Am	100	(Germany) Walkenhorst Motorsport	(Germany) Christian Bollrath (Germany) Jörg Breuer (Finland) Sami-Matti Trogen (Germany) Henry Walkenhorst	BMW M4 GT3	154	+8 Laps
17	**Cup2 Am**	**161**	**(Germany) KKrämer Racing**	**(Germany) Christopher Brück** **(Germany) Karsten Krämer** **(Germany) "Selv"** **(Germany) Alexey Veremenko**	**Porsche 992 GT3 Cup**	**153**	**+9 Laps**
18	**Cup2 Pro**	**169**	**(Germany) Clickversicherung.de Team**	**(Germany) Robin Chrzanowski** **(Germany) Kersten Jodexnis** **(Luxembourg) Dylan Pereira** **(Germany) Peter Scharmach**	**Porsche 992 GT3 Cup**	**153**	**+9 Laps**
19	Cup2 Am	150	(Germany) RPM Racing	(Germany) Philip Hampecht (Germany) Marco Holzer (Sweden) Nic Jönsson (United States) Tracy Krohn	Porsche 992 GT3 Cup	151	+11 Laps
20	**SP 10**	**86**	**(Germany) FK Performance Motorsport**	**(Switzerland) Miklas Born** **(Germany) Christian Konnerth** **(Netherlands) Maxime Oosten** **(Germany) Lorenz Stegmann**	**BMW M4 GT4 Gen II**	**150**	**+12 Laps**
21	SP 10	47	(Hong Kong) KCMG	(Australia) Josh Burdon (Italy) Edoardo Liberati (Estonia) Martin Rump	Toyota GR Supra GT4 Evo	149	+13 Laps
22	Cup2 Pro	163	(Germany) KKrämer Racing	(Germany) Michele Di Martino (Germany) Moritz Kranz (Germany) Herbert Lösch (Germany) Noah Nagelsdiek	Porsche 992 GT3 Cup	149	+13 Laps
23	SP 10	87	(Germany) FK Performance Motorsport	(Germany) Nick Hancke (Germany) Michael Schrey (Germany) Thorsten Wolter (Germany) Nick Wüstenhagen	BMW M4 GT4 Gen II	149	+13 Laps
24	SP 10	79	(Germany) PROsport Racing	(Belgium) Guillaume Dumarey (Germany) Alexander Mies (Germany) Andreas Patzelt (Germany) Hugo Sasse	Aston Martin Vantage AMR GT4	148	+14 Laps
25	**Cup3 Am**	**182**	**(Germany) SRS Team Sorg Rennsport**	**(Germany) Heiko Eichenberg** **(Germany) Fabio Grosse** **(Germany) Patrik Grütter**	**Porsche 718 Cayman GT4 RS Clubsport**	**147**	**+15 Laps**
26	**TCR**	**830**	**(South Korea) Hyundai Motorsport N**	**(Spain) Mikel Azcona** **(Germany) Marc Basseng** **(Germany) Manuel Lauck**	**Hyundai Elantra N TCR**	**147**	**+15 Laps**
27	SP 10	71	(Germany) Toyo Tire with Ring Racing	(Germany) Lance David Arnold (Germany) Andreas Gülden (Japan) Takayuki Kinoshita (Germany) Michael Tischner	Toyota GR Supra GT4	146	+16 Laps
28	Cup2 Am	162		(Germany) Ralf-Peter Bonk (United Kingdom) Bill Cameron (United Kingdom) Jim Cameron	Porsche 992 GT3 Cup	146	+16 Laps
29	TCR	831	(South Korea) Hyundai Motorsport N	(United States) Mason Filippi (United States) Harry Gottsacker (United States) Taylor Hagler (United States) Michael Lewis	Hyundai Elantra N TCR	146	+16 Laps
30	**SP 7**	**151**	**(Germany) RPM Racing**	**(Germany) Tim Breidbach** **(South Korea) Choi Jang-han** **(Czech Republic) Milan Kodidek** **(Belgium) Kris Cools**	**Porsche 991 GT3 II Cup**	**145**	**+17 Laps**
31	Cup2 Pro	123	(Belgium) Mühlner Motorsport	(United Kingdom) Alex Brundle (Germany) Ben Bünnagel (Germany) Tobias Müller (Germany) Kai Riemer	Porsche 992 GT3 Cup	145	+17 Laps
32	SP10	74	(Germany) Walkenhorst Motorsport	(Belgium) Aris Balanian (Belgium) Jarno D'Hauw (Germany) Henry Walkenhorst (Germany) Florian Weber	BMW M4 GT4 Gen II	144	+18 Laps
33	Cup3 Am	181	(Germany) Team Mathol Racing	(United Kingdom) Peter Cate (Germany) Alex Fielenbach (Germany) Arno Klasen (Switzerland) Rüdiger Schicht	Porsche 718 Cayman GT4 RS Clubsport	144	+18 Laps
34	**SP-X**	46	**(Germany) Mercedes-AMG Team HRT**	**(United Kingdom) Frank Bird** **(Germany) Elia Erhart** **(Germany) Thomas Jäger** **(Germany) Jörg Viebahn**	**Mercedes-AMG GT2**	**144**	**+18 Laps**
35	SP 10	75	(Germany) Teichmann Racing	(Germany) Roland Froese (United Kingdom) Scott Marshall (Germany) "Maximilian" (Germany) Florian Naumann	Toyota GR Supra GT4 Evo	144	+18 Laps
36	Cup2 Pro	124	(Belgium) Mühlner Motorsport	(Germany) Thorsten Jung (Germany) Michael Rebhan (Germany) Nick Salewsky (Germany) Tobias Vazquez	Porsche 992 GT3 Cup	143	+19 Laps
37	Cup3 Am	188		(Germany) Leonard Oehme (Germany) Moritz Oehme (Germany) Niklas Oehme (Germany) Ralf Oehme	Porsche 718 Cayman GT4 RS Clubsport	143	+19 Laps
38	SP 10	76	(Germany) Teichmann Racing	(Germany) Stephan Brodmerkel (Germany) Phil Hill (Austria) Constantin Schöll (Germany) Hendrik Still	Toyota GR Supra GT4 Evo	143	+19 Laps
39	Cup3 Am	190	(Germany) W&S Motorsport	(France) Sébastien Perrot (Germany) Andreas Schaflitzl (Switzerland) Guido Wirtz	Porsche 718 Cayman GT4 RS Clubsport	142	+20 Laps
40	**SP 3T**	**110**	**(Germany) Max Kruse Racing**	**(Turkey) Emir Asari** **(France) Benjamin Cartery** **(Germany) Max Partl** **(Germany) Matthias Wasel**	**Volkswagen Golf GTI TCR**	**141**	**+21 Laps**
41	**AT**	**420**	**(Germany) Four Motors Bioconcept-Car**	**(Germany) Matthias Beckwermert** **(Germany) Karl Pflanz** **(Netherlands) Marco van Ramshorst** **(Germany) Oliver Sprungmann**	**Porsche 718 Cayman GT4 Clubsport**	**141**	**+21 Laps**
42	SP-X	222	(Germany) Schnitzelalm Racing	(Canada) Mikaël Grenier (Germany) Jay Mo Härtling (United States) David Thilenius (Germany) Moritz Wiskirchen	Mercedes-AMG GT2	141	+21 Laps
43	AT	320	(Germany) Four Motors Bioconcept-Car	(Denmark) Henrik Bollerslev (Germany) Thomas Kiefer (Germany) Thomas von Löwis of Menar (Germany) "Smudo"	Porsche 991 GT3 II Cup	141	+21 Laps
44	SP 10	90	(Germany) Adrenalin Motorsport Team Motec	(Switzerland) Michelangelo Comazzi (Germany) Nick Deißler (Japan) Ryusho Konishi (Germany) Florian Wolf	BMW M4 GT4	139	+23 Laps
45	**M240i**	**246**	**(Germany) Adrenalin Motorsport Team Motec**	**(Germany) Yannick Fübrich** **(Germany) Stefan Kruse** **(Germany) Sven Markert** **(Germany) Nils Steinberg**	**BMW M240i Racing**	**138**	**+24 Laps**
46	AT	227	(Germany) Griesemann Gruppe by TR Team	(Germany) Dirk Adorf (Germany) Björn Griesemann (Germany) Georg Griesemann (Germany) Felix von der Laden	Toyota GR Supra GT4 Evo	138	+24 Laps
47	M240i	243	(Germany) Adrenalin Motorsport Team Motec	(Germany) Michel Albers (Germany) Marco Büsker (Germany) Marvin Marino (Germany) Aaron Wenisch	BMW M240i Racing	136	+26 Laps
48	SP 7	13		(Germany) Bernd Albrecht (Germany) Kurt Ecke (Germany) Steffen Schlichenmeier (Germany) Andreas Sczepansky	Porsche 991 GT3 II Cup	136	+26 Laps
49	**V6**	**396**	**(Germany) Adrenalin Motorsport Team Motec**	**(Spain) Carlos Arimón** **(Germany) Christian Büllesbach** **(Germany) Jürgen Nett** **(Germany) Andreas Schettler**	**Porsche Cayman S**	**135**	**+27 Laps**
50	**SP 8T**	**82**	**(Germany) Giti Tire Motorsport By WS Racing**	**(China) Rainey He** **(Hong Kong) Sunny Wong** **(Hong Kong) Andy Yan**	**BMW M4 GT4**	**135**	**+27 Laps**
51	**VT2 Hecka**	**330**	**(Germany) Adrenalin Motorsport Team Motec**	**(Germany) Jacob Erlbacher** **(Germany) Philipp Leisen** **(Germany) Oskar Sandberg** **(Germany) Daniel Zils**	**BMW 330i Racing**	**135**	**+27 Laps**
52	AT	633	(Germany) Four Motors Bioconcept-Car	(Germany) Henning Cramer (Germany) Christoph Hewer (Switzerland) Marc Schöni (Switzerland) Marco Timbal	Porsche Cayman GT4 Clubsport	133	+29 Laps
53	**V5**	**444**	**(Germany) Adrenalin Motorsport Team Motec**	**(Germany) Joachim Nett** **(Germany) Daniel Korn** **(Germany) Tobias Korn** **(Germany) Ulrich Korn**	**Porsche Cayman CM12**	**132**	**+30 Laps**
54	M240i	247	(Germany) Adrenalin Motorsport Team Motec	(Germany) Simon Klemund (Germany) Christian Kraus (Germany) Laura Luft (Mexico) Luis Ramírez	BMW M240i Racing	131	+31 Laps
55	Cup3 Am	180	(Germany) Huber Racing	(Germany) David Kiefer (Germany) Marius Kiefer (Germany) Stefan Kiefer (Austria) Luca Rettenbacher	Porsche 718 Cayman GT4 RS Clubsport	130	+32 Laps
56	**VT3**	**300**	**(Germany) Team Mathol Racing**	**(Germany) Thorsten Held** **(Germany) Matthias Trinius** **(Sweden) Eric Ullström** **(Argentina) Marcos Adolfo Vázquez**	**Porsche Cayman S CB12**	**130**	**+32 Laps**
57	M240i	242	(Germany) Adrenalin Motorsport Team Motec	(Germany) Thomas Ardelt (Germany) Manuel Dormagen (Germany) Sven Oepen	BMW M240i Racing	129	+33 Laps
58	V6	561		(Germany) David Ackermann (Germany) Holger Gachot (Germany) Axel Jahn (Germany) Bernd Kleeschulte	Porsche Cayman GTS	129	+33 Laps
59	V6	91		(Germany) Alexander Köppen (Germany) Jacek Pydys (Germany) Sebastian Rings	Porsche 911 Carrera	126	+36 Laps
60	**SP 3**	**119**	**Toyota Gazoo Racing Team Thailand**	**(Thailand) Nattavude Charoensukhawatana** **(Thailand) Nattapong Hortongkum** **(Thailand) Manat Kulapalanont** **(Thailand) Suttipong Smittachartch**	**Toyota Corolla Altis GT N24**	**126**	**+36 Laps**
61	SP 3	120	Toyota Gazoo Racing Team Thailand	(Taiwan) Chen Jian Hong (Japan) Naoki Kawamura (Thailand) Grant Supaphongs (Thailand) Kris Vasuratna	Toyota Corolla Altis GT N24	125	+37 Laps
62	VT2 Hecka	331	(Germany) Adrenalin Motorsport Team Motec	(Germany) Klaus Faßbender (Germany) Thomas Jühlen (Switzerland) Michael Lüthi (Germany) Andreas Winkler	BMW 330i Racing	124	+38 Laps
63	**V4**	**542**		**(Germany) Anton Bauer** **(Sweden) Dan Berghult** **(Germany) Meik ter Haar** **(United Kingdom) Ben Lyons**	**BMW 325i**	**124**	**+38 Laps**
64	V5	551	(Germany) Schmickler Performance powered by Ravenol	(Germany) Frank Nikolaus (Germany) Christoph Ruhrmann (Germany) Joachim Schulz (Germany) Manfred Weber	Porsche Cayman CM12	124	+38 Laps
65	VT2 Hecka	522	(Germany) SRS Team Sorg Rennsport	(Germany) Christian Leukers (Netherlands) Piet-Jan Ooms (Germany) Björn Simon (Germany) Hans Joachim Theiß	BMW 330i Racing	124	+38 Laps
66	M240i	245		(Austria) Michael Fischer (Switzerland) Dominic Kulpowicz (Germany) Kevin Wambach (Germany) Benno Zerlin	BMW M240i Racing	124	+38 Laps
67	VT2 Hecka	531	(Germany) MSG Bayerischer Wald Hutthurm e.V. im ADAC	(Romania) Minhea Birisan (Germany) Jörg Schönfelder (Romania) Alexandru Vasilescu (Germany) Serge Van Vooren	BMW 328i Racing	123	+39 Laps
68	**VT2 Front**	**527**	**(South Korea) Hyundai Driving Experience**	**(Germany) Michael Bohrer** **(Germany) Gerrit Holthaus** **(Germany) Tobias Overbeck** **(Germany) Marcus Willhardt**	**Hyundai i30 Fastback N**	**123**	**+39 Laps**
69	Cup3 Am	189	(Germany) Black Falcon Team Textar	(Germany) Franz Engstler (United States) Cabell Fisher (Germany) Axel Sartingen (Germany) Daniel Schwerfeld	Porsche 718 Cayman GT4 RS Clubsport	122	+40 Laps
70	TCR	66	(Germany) MSC Kempenich	(Germany) Philipp Eis (Germany) Torsten Kratz (Germany) Meik Utsch (Germany) Jens Wulf	Cupra León TCR	121	+41 Laps
71	Cup3 Am	185	(Germany) SRS Team Sorg Rennsport	(Luxembourg) Jose Casares Garcia (Netherlands) Milan Dontje (United States) Dan Miller (Germany) Carlo Scholl	Porsche 718 Cayman GT4 RS Clubsport	121	+41 Laps
72	VT2 Hecka	83	(Germany) Giti Tire Motorsport By WS Racing	(Germany) Lukas Drost (Germany) Matthias Möller (New Zealand) Wayne Moore (Germany) Fabian Pirrone	BMW 330i Racing	119	+43 Laps
73	V4	541		(Germany) Henning Hausmeier (Germany) Desiree Müller (Germany) Philipp Romboy (Germany) Marcel Unland	BMW 325i	118	+44 Laps
74	SP 3	121	(Germany) Automobilclub von Deutschland	(Germany) Peter Hass (Germany) Jürgen Schulten (Germany) Volker Strycek (Germany) Hans-Olaf Beckmann (Note: Hans-Olaf Beckmann was an entered driver in the No. 121 car, but did not complete the required 15 laps and thus was not credited as finisher.)	Opel Manta (Flying Fox) GT	117	+45 Laps
75	**SP 4T**	**718**	**(Germany) Smyrlis Racing**	**(Germany) Guido Heinrich** **(Germany) Fabian Peitzmeier** **(Germany) Christopher Rink** **(Germany) Ioannis Smyrlis**	**Porsche 718 Cayman GT4 Clubsport**	**116**	**+46 Laps**
76	VT2 Front	126	(Germany) Bulldog Racing	(United Kingdom) Charles Cooper (Germany) Christoph Kragenings (Germany) Michael Mönch (Germany) Sebastian Sauerbrei	MINI John Cooper Works GP	114	+48 Laps
77	SP 4T	114	(Japan) Subaru Tecnica International	(Netherlands) Carlo van Dam (Japan) Takuto Iguchi (Germany) Tim Schrick (Japan) Hideki Yamauchi	Subaru WRX STI GT N24	114	+48 Laps
78	**SP 6**	**153**	**(Switzerland) Hofor Racing**	**(Switzerland) Martin Kroll** **(Switzerland) Michael Kroll** **(Germany) Bernd Küpper** **(Switzerland) Alexander Prinz**	**BMW M3 E46 GTR**	**112**	**+50 Laps**
79	VT2 Front	84	(Germany) Giti Tire Motorsport By WS Racing	(Germany) Robert Hinzer (Germany) Niklas Kry (Germany) Ulrich Schmidt (Germany) Andrei Sidorenko	Volkswagen Scirocco	109	+53 Laps
80	VT2 Front	111		(Switzerland) Peter Baumann (Germany) Kevin Olaf Rost (Germany) Olaf Rost (Germany) Sebastian Schemmann	Volkswagen Scirocco R TSI	108	+54 Laps
81	SP 8T	81	(Germany) Giti Tire Motorsport By WS Racing	(United Kingdom) Pippa Mann (France) Célia Martin (Netherlands) Beitske Visser (Liechtenstein) Fabienne Wohlwend	BMW M4 GT4 Gen II	105	+57 Laps
82	VT2 Hecka	535	(Germany) Manheller Racing	(Germany) Maximilian von Görtz (Germany) Marcel Manheller (Germany) Martin Owen (Japan) Yutaka Seki	BMW 328i Racing	104	+58 Laps
83	SP 3T	109	(Germany) MSC Sinzig e.V. im ADAC	(Germany) Arndt Hallmanns (Germany) Wolfgang Haugg (Germany) Peter Muggianu (Germany) Roland Waschkau	Audi TTS	96	+66 Laps
84	TCR	57		(France) Jean-Marc Finot (France) Jean-Philippe Imparato (Portugal) Carlos Tavares (France) François Wales	Opel Astra TCR	96	+66 Laps
85	VT2 Front	524	(Germany) SRS Team Sorg Rennsport	(Germany) Kurt Strube (Germany) Bernhard Wagner (Germany) Alex Wright (Italy) ~~Alberto Carobbio~~ (Note: Alberto Carobbio was disqualified during the race.)	BMW 128ti	95	+67 Laps
86	VT2 Front	55		(Germany) Lars Füting (Germany) Christian Gatterer (Germany) Tobias Jung (Germany) Tim Robertz	Opel Astra GTC	88	+74 Laps
87	TCR	834	(Germany) sharky-racing by MSC Sinzig e.V. im ADAC	(Armenia) Artur Goroyan (Armenia) Roman Mavlanov (Germany) Volker Garrn (Switzerland) Jasmin Preisig (Note: Volker Garrn and Jasmin Preisig were entered drivers in the No. 834 sharky-racing car, but did not complete the required 15 laps each and thus were not credited as finishers.)	Audi RS 3 LMS TCR (2017)	85	+77 Laps
88	SP 3T	108	(Germany) sharky-racing by MSC Sinzig e.V. im ADAC	(Germany) Richard Jodexnis (Germany) Knut Kluge (Germany) Joris Primke (Germany) Ralf Weiner (Note: Ralf Weiner was an entered driver in the No. 108 sharky-racing car, but did not complete the required 15 laps and thus was not credited as finisher.)	Volkswagen Golf GTI TCR	84	+78 Laps
NC	SP 10	68	(Germany) Dörr Motorsport	(Germany) Finn Albig (Germany) Olaf Hoppelshäuser (Germany) Stefan Kenntemich (Germany) Rolf Scheibner	Aston Martin Vantage AMR GT4	74	+88 Laps
NC	VT2 Hecka	526	(Germany) QTQ-Raceperformance	(Germany) Florian Ebener (Germany) Maximilian Kurz (Germany) Riccardo Petrolo (Germany) Florian Quante	BMW 330i Racing	70	+92 Laps
DNF	M240i	241		(Germany) Alexander Meixner (Thailand) Kiki Sak Nana (Germany) Markus Nölken	BMW M240i Racing	128	Accident
DNF	Cup2 Am	160	(Germany) ADAC Sachsen e.V.	(Germany) Dominik Fugel (Germany) Fidel Leib (Germany) Benjamin Leuchter (Germany) Moritz Oestreich	Porsche 992 GT3 Cup	122	
DNF	Cup3 Am	186	(Germany) W&S Motorsport	(France) Sébastien Carcone (Germany) Axel Duffner (Luxembourg) Max Lamesch (Germany) Jürgen Vöhringer	Porsche 718 Cayman GT4 RS Clubsport	116	
DNF	Cup2 Pro	125	(Germany) Huber Motorsport	(Germany) Ulrich Berg (Germany) Christer Jöns (Germany) Thomas Kiefer (Germany) Hans Wehrmann	Porsche 992 GT3 Cup	111	
DNF	V6	562	(Germany) Schmickler Performance powered by Ravenol	(Germany) Albert Egbert (Germany) Christian Heuchemer (Germany) Thomas Heuchemer (Germany) Sascha Kloft	Porsche 911 Carrera	107	
DNF	VT2 Front	65	(Germany) MSC Kempenich	(Germany) Niklas Ehrhardt (Germany) Thomas Ehrhardt (Brazil) Flavia Pellegrino Fernandes (Germany) Roman Schiemenz	Volkswagen Scirocco R TSI	107	
DNF	SP 9 Pro	25	(Germany) Huber Motorsport	(France) Romain Dumas (Germany) Dennis Fetzer (Germany) Lars Kern (France) Côme Ledogar	Porsche 911 GT3 R (992)	105	
DNF	VT2 Front	56		(Germany) Michael Eichhorn (Germany) Daniel Jenichen (United States) Tony Roma (Germany) Andreas Winterwerber	Opel Astra GTC	101	
DNF	SP 10	70	(Germany) Toyo Tire with Ring Racing	(Germany) Marc Hennerici (Japan) Takayuki Kinoshita (Germany) Tim Sandtler (Germany) Heiko Tönges	Toyota GR Supra GT4	100	
DNF	SP 10	67	(Germany) Dörr Motorsport	(Germany) Michael Funke (France) Théo Nouet (Germany) Sven Schädler (Germany) Frank Weishar	Aston Martin Vantage AMR GT4	100	
DNF	SP 9 Pro	72	(Germany) BMW Junior Team	(United Kingdom) Daniel Harper (Germany) Max Hesse (United States) Neil Verhagen	BMW M4 GT3	96	Double stint
DNF	SP 9 Pro	7	(Austria) Konrad Motorsport	(Netherlands) Yelmer Buurman (Zimbabwe) Axcil Jefferies (Bulgaria) Pavel Lefterov (United States) Danny Soufi	Lamborghini Huracán GT3 Evo	94	
DNF	SP 10	89	(Germany) Haupt Racing Team	(Germany) Alexander Kroker (Germany) Reinhold Renger (Germany) Tim-Florian Wahl (Germany) Tobias Wahl	Mercedes-AMG GT4	92	
DNF	SP 6	152	(Germany) RPM Racing	(Germany) Michael Czyborra (Netherlands) Duncan Huisman (Netherlands) Patrick Huisman	Porsche 991 GT3 I Cup	91	
DNF	SP 9 Pro	102	(Germany) Walkenhorst Motorsport	(United Kingdom) Jake Dennis (Germany) Jens Klingmann (Norway) Christian Krognes (France) Thomas Neubauer	BMW M4 GT3	89	
DNF	SP 9 Pro	99	(Germany) Rowe Racing	(Austria) Philipp Eng (Brazil) Augusto Farfus (United States) Connor De Phillippi (United Kingdom) Nick Yelloly	BMW M4 GT3	83	
DNF	SP 9 Pro	54	(Italy) Dinamic GT	(Germany) Christian Engelhart (Turkey) Ayhancan Güven (Germany) Laurin Heinrich (Belgium) Laurens Vanthoor	Porsche 911 GT3 R (992)	83	Crash
DNF	SP 9 Pro	1	(Germany) Audi Sport Team Scherer PHX	(San Marino) Mattia Drudi (Switzerland) Ricardo Feller (Denmark) Dennis Lind (Belgium) Frédéric Vervisch	Audi R8 LMS Evo II	80	
DNF	SP 9 Pro	5	(Germany) Scherer Sport PHX	(Germany) Vincent Kolb (United Kingdom) Alexander Sims (Germany) Frank Stippler (Netherlands) Renger van der Zande	Audi R8 LMS Evo II	80	
DNF	M240i	240		(Germany) Martin Heidrich (Germany) Lucas Lange (Germany) Sascha Lott (Germany) Dirk Volmer	BMW M240i Racing	78	
DNF	SP 9 Pro	33	(Germany) Falken Motorsports	(Austria) Klaus Bachler (Germany) Sven Müller (Belgium) Alessio Picariello	Porsche 911 GT3 R (992)	77	
DNF	SP 9 Pro-Am	11	(Germany) Schnitzelalm Racing	(Germany) Patrick Assenheimer (Germany) Marek Böckmann (Netherlands) Colin Caresani (Germany) Marcel Marchewicz	Mercedes-AMG GT3 Evo	75	
DNF	V4	540	(Germany) QTQ-Raceperformance	(Germany) Oliver Frisse (Germany) Jürgen Huber (Germany) Christian Knötschke (Germany) Simon Sagmeister	BMW 328i L	73	
DNF	TCR	816	(Germany) Scherer Sport PHX	(Germany) Stephan Epp (Germany) Heiko Hammel (Switzerland) Mathias Schläppi (Switzerland) Frédéric Yerly	Cupra León Competición TCR	65	
DNF	VT2 Front	525	(South Korea) Hyundai Driving Experience	(Germany) Jens Dralle (South Korea) Kang Byung-hui (South Korea) Park June-sung (United States) Jeff Ricca	Hyundai i30 Fastback N	65	
DNF	SP 9 Pro	911	(Germany) Manthey EMA	(Denmark) Michael Christensen (France) Kévin Estre (France) Frédéric Makowiecki (Austria) Thomas Preining	Porsche 911 GT3 R (992)	62	Accident damage
DNF	SP 9 Pro-Am	69	(Germany) Dörr Motorsport	(Germany) Ben Dörr (Germany) Phil Dörr (Germany) Peter Posavac (United Kingdom) Darren Turner	Aston Martin Vantage AMR GT3	62	
DNF	Cup3 Am	85		(United Kingdom) James Breakell (New Zealand) Grant Dalton (United Kingdom) Harley Haughton (New Zealand) Grant Woolford	Porsche 718 Cayman GT4 RS Clubsport	61	
DNF	SP 10	73	(Germany) BMW M Motorsport	(United Kingdom) Jethro Bovingdon (Germany) Christian Gebhardt (Germany) Guido Naumann (Germany) Jörg Weidinger	BMW M4 GT4 Gen II	61	
DNF	Cup3 Am	187	(Germany) W&S Motorsport	(Luxembourg) Daniel Bohr (Germany) Heinz Dolfen (United States) Andreas Gabler (Germany) John Lee Schambony	Porsche 718 Cayman GT4 RS Clubsport	56	
DNF	SP 3	118	(Germany) Ollis Garage	(Germany) Thomas Geile (Germany) Oliver Kriese (Germany) Michael Lachmeyer (Germany) Maximilian Weissermel	Dacia Logan	53	Crash
DNF	SP 9 Pro	3	(Germany) Mercedes-AMG Team GetSpeed	(Germany) Maro Engel (Andorra) Jules Gounon (Spain) Daniel Juncadella	Mercedes-AMG GT3 Evo	49	Accident damage
DNF	SP 7	184	(Germany) KKrämer Racing	(Germany) Olaf Baunack (Germany) Mario Handrick (Germany) Karl Heinz Meyer (Germany) Jan Boris Schmäing	Porsche Cayman GT4 Clubsport	44	
DNF	SP 9 Pro-Am	10	(Germany) Schnitzelalm Racing	(Germany) Marek Böckmann (Germany) Kenneth Heyer (Germany) Marcel Marchewicz (Germany) Luca-Sandro Trefz	Mercedes-AMG GT3 Evo	43	
DNF	V6	563	(Germany) SRS Team Sorg Rennsport	(Germany) Heinz Jürgen Kroner (Mexico) Xavier Lamadrid Jr. (Mexico) Xavier Lamadrid Sr. (Italy) Ugo Vicenzi	Porsche Cayman S	42	
DNF	SP 9 Pro	101	(Germany) Walkenhorst Motorsport	(Poland) Kuba Giermaziak (Norway) Christian Krognes (Finland) Jesse Krohn (Spain) Andy Soucek	BMW M4 GT3	39	
DNF	VT2 Front	533	(Germany) Zierau Hochvolt by Mertens Motorsport	(Germany) Norbert Fischer (Germany) Daniel Mertens (Germany) Stephan Schroers (Germany) Felix Schumann	Hyundai i30 Fastback N	39	
DNF	SP 10	78	(Germany) PROsport Racing	(Germany) Rudi Adams (Belgium) Guido Dumarey (Germany) Michael Hess (Ukraine) Yevgen Sokolovsky	Aston Martin Vantage AMR GT4	38	
DNF	SP 4T	115	(Belgium) KGL AMC St. Vith	(Belgium) Philippe Broodcooren (Belgium) Tom Cloet (Belgium) Jacques Derenne (Italy) ~~Bruno Barbaro~~ (Note: Bruno Barbaro was disqualified during qualifying.)	Porsche 718 Cayman GT4 Clubsport	37	
DNF	SP 10	88	(Germany) FK Performance Motorsport	(Switzerland) Ranko Mijatovic (New Zealand) Tony Richards (Belgium) Hakan Sari (Belgium) Recep Sari	BMW M4 GT4 Gen II	26	
DNF	SP 9 Pro	24	(Germany) Lionspeed by Car Collection Motorsport	(Australia) Matt Campbell (France) Mathieu Jaminet (Germany) Patrick Kolb (France) Patrick Pilet	Porsche 911 GT3 R (992)	16	puncture which damaged

== Bibliography ==
- Jörg-Richard Ufer & Tim Upietz. 24 Stunden Nürburgring Nordschleife 2023. Gruppe C Motorsport Verlag. ISBN 978-3-948501-24-2.
