= Patrick Kolb =

German racing driver (born 1994)

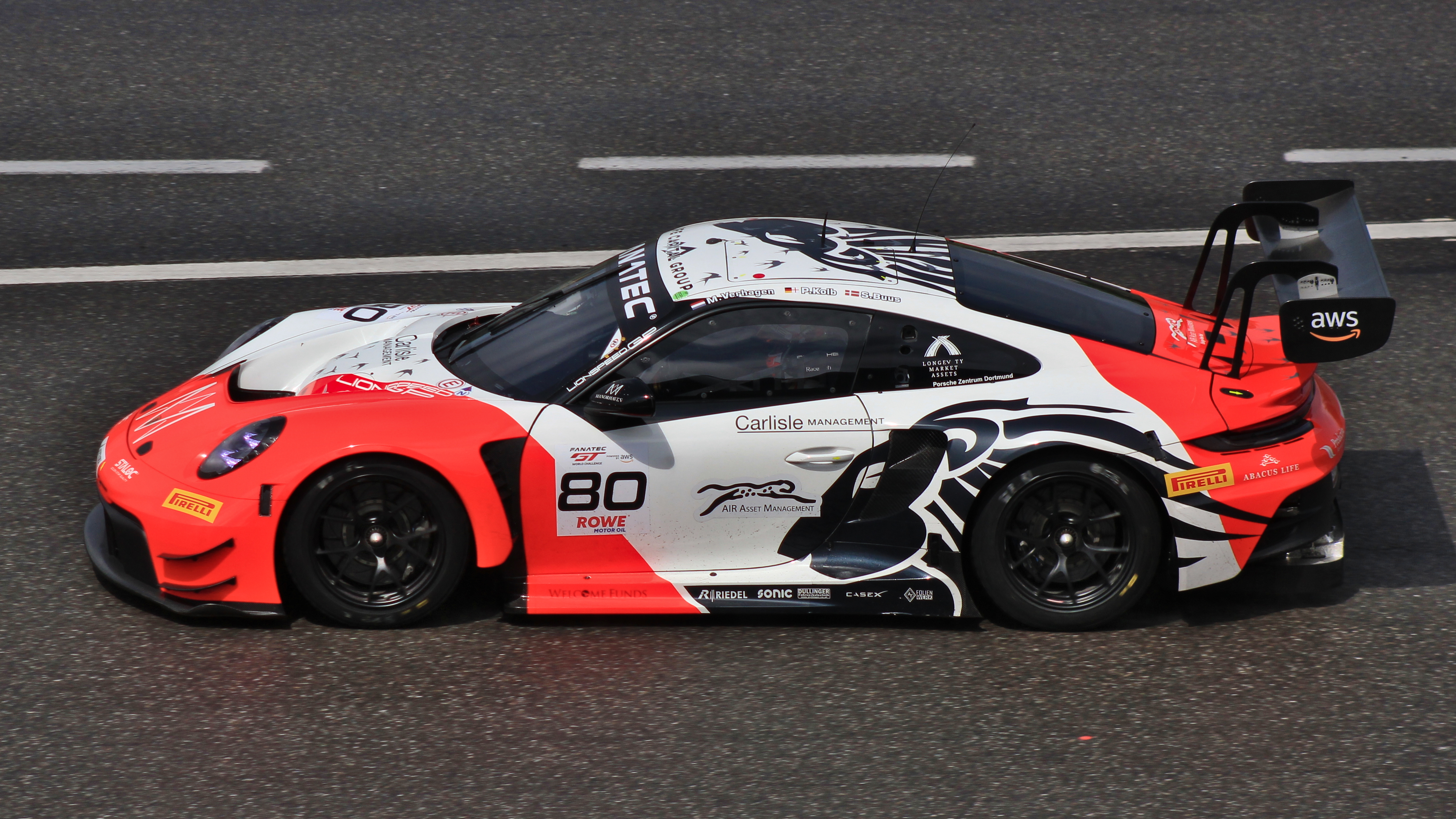
- Kolb in 2024
- Nationality: (Germany) German
- Born: 26 September 1994 (age 32) Bad Homburg, Germany
- Categorisation: FIA Silver

Championship titles
- 2020–2021 2019: Nürburgring Langstrecken-Serie – SP9 Pro-Am; VLN Series – SP7

Patrick Kolb (born 26 September 1994) is a German and British racing driver and team owner who last competed in the GT World Challenge Europe Endurance Cup for Lionspeed GP. He founded the team in 2019, and won the Nürburgring 24 Hours in SP9 Pro-Am in 2020 and 2024.

== Personal life ==
Kolb is the son of German businessman and amateur racing driver Uwe Kolb.

== Career ==
Kolb began his racing career in 2017, competing in the GT1 class of Classic Endurance Racing. After making his VLN Series debut for Porsche-affiliated Huber Motorsport in 2018, Kolb co-founded Lionspeed GP in 2019 with José Garcia, and formed an alliance with Huber. Racing alongside Andreas Simonsen in the SP7 class, Kolb took four wins from seven races to clinch his first VLN class title.

In 2020, Kolb graduated to GT3 competition and partnered Marco Holzer and Lorenzo Rocco Di Torrepadula in the SP9 Pro-Am class of the newly-renamed Nürburgring Langstrecken-Serie. Driving a Porsche 911 GT3 R, the trio scored three class wins en route to the NLS title, and won the 24 Hours of Nürburgring in class with Nico Menzel. In 2021, Kolb and Lionspeed switched to Car Collection Motorsport to field an Audi R8 LMS Evo. Kolb and Rocco Di Torrepadula reclaimed the SP9 Pro-Am title with four class wins in NLS. Kolb also made his GT World Challenge Europe Endurance Cup debut at Paul Ricard. A sixth place at the 24 Hours of Nürburgring on Kolb's SP9 Pro debut then followed in 2022, before Lionspeed reunited with Porsche in 2023. That year, Kolb competed in the first four rounds of International GT Open for Lionspeed, taking an overall podium at Le Castellet with Alfred Renauer.

In 2024, Lionspeed began racing as an independent team, as Kolb came runner-up in the 24H Series's GT4 class with four podiums, as well as contesting most of the GT World Challenge Europe Endurance Cup, where he tasted silverware at the Nürburgring in Bronze Cup. During 2024, Kolb also won a fog-shortened 24 Hours of Nürburgring in SP9 Pro-Am alongside Antares Au, Indy Dontje and Patric Niederhauser. Embarking on a full GTWCE Endurance Cup season with Ricardo Feller and Gabriel Rindone in 2025, Kolb once again scored a podium at the Nürburgring, as the No. 80 Porsche took third in Bronze Cup points. In 2026, Kolb and Lionspeed remained in the Bronze Cup of the GT World Challenge Europe Endurance Cup in a revised lineup featuring Alex Fontana and Bashar Mardini. In his second full-season in GTWC competition, Kolb took a lone Bronze Cup podium at the 24 Hours of Spa to end the year 13th in points.

== Racing record ==
=== Racing career summary ===
Season	Series	Team	Races	Wins	Poles	F/Laps	Podiums	Points	Position
2017	Classic Endurance Racing – GT1		1	0	0	0	0	20	21st
2018	VLN Series – Cup 2	Huber Motorsport							
2019	VLN Series – SP7	Huber Motorsport	7	4	0	0	5	47.11	1st
2019	24 Hours of Nürburgring – SP7	Huber Motorsport	1	0	0	0	0	—N/a	5th
2019	ADAC 24h Classic – Youngtimer		1	0	0	0	0	—N/a	60th
2019	2.0L Cup Endurance Series		1	0	0	0	0	22	68th
2019	Sixties Endurance		1	0	0	0	0	20	170th
2020	Nürburgring Langstrecken-Serie – SP9 Pro-Am	Huber Motorsport	5	3	0	0	5	26.25	1st
2020	24 Hours of Nürburgring – SP9 Pro-Am	Huber Motorsport	1	1	0	0	1	—N/a	1st
2020	ADAC 24h Classic – Youngtimer		1	0	0	0	0	—N/a	18th
2020	2.0L Cup Endurance Series		2	0	0	0	0	41	7th
2020	Classic Endurance Racing – GT1		1	0	0	0	0	29.5	10th
2021	Nürburgring Langstrecken-Serie – SP9 Pro-Am	Lionspeed by Car Collection Motorsport	8	4	3	0	5	42.58	1st
2021	24 Hours of Nürburgring – SP9 Pro-Am	Lionspeed by Car Collection Motorsport	1	0	0	0	0	—N/a	8th
2021	GT World Challenge Europe Endurance Cup	Car Collection Motorsport	1	0	0	0	0	0	NC
2021	GT World Challenge Europe Endurance Cup – Silver	Car Collection Motorsport	1	0	0	0	0	0	NC
2021	Nürburgring Langstrecken-Serie – SP9 Pro	Audi Sport Team Car Collection	1	0	0	0	0	6.82	11th
2021	ADAC 24h Classic – Youngtimer		1	0	0	0	0	—N/a	31st
2021	Spa Six Hours – GTS11		1	0	0	0	0	—N/a	9th
2021	24H GT Series – GT4	Lionspeed by Car Collection Motorsport	1	0	0	0	0	0	NC
2022	24H GT Series Continents – GT3 Am	Car Collection Motorsport	1	0	0	0	0	11	NC
2022	Nürburgring Langstrecken-Serie – SP9	Lionspeed by Car Collection	4	0	0	0	0	0	NC
2022	24 Hours of Nürburgring – SP9 Pro	Audi Sport Team Lionspeed by Car Collection	1	0	0	0	0	—N/a	6th
2022	24H GT Series Europe – GT4	Lionspeed by Car Collection Motorsport	2	0	0	0	1	35	2nd
2022	Intercontinental GT Challenge	Herberth Motorsport	1	0	0	0	0	4	20th
2022–23	Middle East Trophy – GT4	Lionspeed Racing by Herberth Motorsport	1	0	0	0	1	32	NC
2023	Nürburgring Langstrecken-Serie – SP9 Pro	Lionspeed by Car Collection Motorsport	1	0	0	0	0	0	NC
2023	24 Hours of Nürburgring – SP9 Pro	Lionspeed by Car Collection Motorsport	1	0	0	0	0	—N/a	DNF
2023	24H GT Series – GT4	Lionspeed GP by SRS Team Sorg Rennsport	1	0	0	0	1	32	NC
2023	International GT Open	Lionspeed GP	7	0	0	0	1	22	12th
2023	Porsche Endurance Trophy Nürburgring – Cup 3	Lionspeed GP	1	0	0	0	0	0	NC
2023	24H GT Series – GT3 Pro-Am	Herberth Motorsport	1	0	0	0	1	54	NC
2023–24	Middle East Trophy – TCX	SRS Team Sorg Rennsport	1	0	0	0	1	36	NC
2024	24H Series – GT4	Lionspeed GP	5	0	0	0	4	158	2nd
2024	GT World Challenge Europe Endurance Cup	Lionspeed GP	4	0	0	0	0	0	NC
2024	GT World Challenge Europe Endurance Cup – Bronze	Lionspeed GP	4	0	0	0	1	20	19th
2024	Intercontinental GT Challenge	Lionspeed GP	1	0	0	0	0	8	20th
2024	Nürburgring Langstrecken-Serie – SP9 Pro-Am	Lionspeed GP	2	0	0	0	0	0	NC
2024	24 Hours of Nürburgring – SP9 Pro-Am	Lionspeed GP	1	1	0	0	1	—N/a	1st
2024	Gulf 12 Hours – GT3 Pro-Am	Lionspeed GP	1	0	0	0	0	—N/a	7th
2025	GT World Challenge Europe Endurance Cup	Lionspeed GP	5	0	0	0	0	0	NC
2025	GT World Challenge Europe Endurance Cup – Bronze	Lionspeed GP	5	0	0	0	1	62	3rd
2025	Intercontinental GT Challenge	Lionspeed GP	1	0	0	0	0	0	NC
2025	24H Series – 992	Lionspeed GP	1	0	0	0	0	18	NC
2026	GT World Challenge Europe Endurance Cup	Lionspeed GP	5	0	0	0	0	0	NC
2026	GT World Challenge Europe Endurance Cup – Bronze	Lionspeed GP	5	0	0	0	1	31	13th
2026	Intercontinental GT Challenge	Lionspeed GP	1	0	0	0	0	4	28th
2026	GT3 Revival Series – Gen 2 Am	Lionspeed GP	0	0	0	0	0	0	NC
2026	Nürburgring Langstrecken-Serie – SP9	Lionspeed GP	0	0	0	0	0	0	NC
2026	24 Hours of Nürburgring – SP9 Pro-Am	Lionspeed GP	1	0	0	0	1	—N/a	2nd

^{†} As Kolb was a guest driver, he was ineligible to score points.

=== Complete 24 Hours of Nürburgring results ===
Year	Team	Co-Drivers	Car	Class	Laps	Pos.	Class Pos.
2019	(Germany) Huber Motorsport	(Germany) Ulrich Berg (United States) Jonathan Miller (Germany) Johannes Stengel	Porsche 911 GT3 Cup	SP7	142	25th	5th
2020	(Germany) Huber Motorsport	(Germany) Marco Holzer (Germany) Nico Menzel (Italy) Lorenzo Rocco Di Torrepadula	Porsche 911 GT3 R	SP9; Pro-Am	82	15th	1st
2021	(Germany) Lionspeed by Car Collection Motorsport	(Netherlands) Milan Dontje (Switzerland) Patric Niederhauser (Italy) Lorenzo Rocco Di Torrepadula	Audi R8 LMS Evo	SP9; Pro-Am	54	24th	8th
2022	(Germany) Audi Sport Team Lionspeed by Car Collection	(Italy) Mattia Drudi (Germany) Christopher Mies (Switzerland) Patric Niederhauser	Audi R8 LMS Evo II	SP9; Pro	159	6th	6th
2023	(Germany) Lionspeed by Car Collection Motorsport	(Australia) Matt Campbell (France) Mathieu Jaminet (France) Patrick Pilet	Porsche 911 GT3 R (992)	SP9; Pro	16	DNF	DNF
2024	(Germany) Lionspeed GP	(Hong Kong) Antares Au (Netherlands) Indy Dontje (Switzerland) Patric Niederhauser	Porsche 911 GT3 R (992)	SP9; Pro-Am	50	9th	1st
2026	(Germany) Lionspeed GP	(United Kingdom) Jake Hill (Austria) Max Hofer (United Kingdom) Kyle Tilley	Porsche 911 GT3 R (992.2)	SP9 Pro-Am	153	10th	2nd

=== Complete GT World Challenge Europe results ===
==== GT World Challenge Europe Endurance Cup ====
Year	Team	Car	Class	1	2	3	4	5	6	7	Pos.	Points
2021	Car Collection Motorsport	Audi R8 LMS Evo	Silver	MNZ	LEC; 33	SPA; 6H	SPA; 12H	SPA; 24H	NÜR	CAT	NC	0
2024	Lionspeed GP	Porsche 911 GT3 R (992)	Bronze	LEC; 30	SPA; 6H	SPA; 12H	SPA; 24H	NÜR; 28	MNZ; Ret	JED; Ret	19th	20
2025	Lionspeed GP	Porsche 911 GT3 R (992)	Bronze	LEC; 38	MNZ; 40	SPA; 6H; 42	SPA; 12H; 12	SPA; 24H; 21	NÜR; 33	CAT; 26	3rd	62
2026	Lionspeed GP	Porsche 911 GT3 R (992.2)	Bronze	LEC; Ret	MNZ; 21	SPA; 6H; 41	SPA; 12H; 27	SPA; 24H; 20	NÜR; 44	ALG; 46	13th	31

=== Complete International GT Open results ===
Year	Team	Car	Class	1	2	3	4	5	6	7	8	9	10	11	12	13	Pos.	Points
2023	Lionspeed GP	Porsche 911 GT3 R (992)	Pro	ALG; 1; 6	ALG; 2; 15	SPA; 40†	HUN; 1; 16	HUN; 2; 10	LEC; 1; 3	LEC; 2; 5	RBR; 1	RBR; 2	MNZ; 1	MNZ; 2	CAT; 1	CAT; 2	12th	22
