= Ricardo Feller =

Swiss racing driver (born 2000)

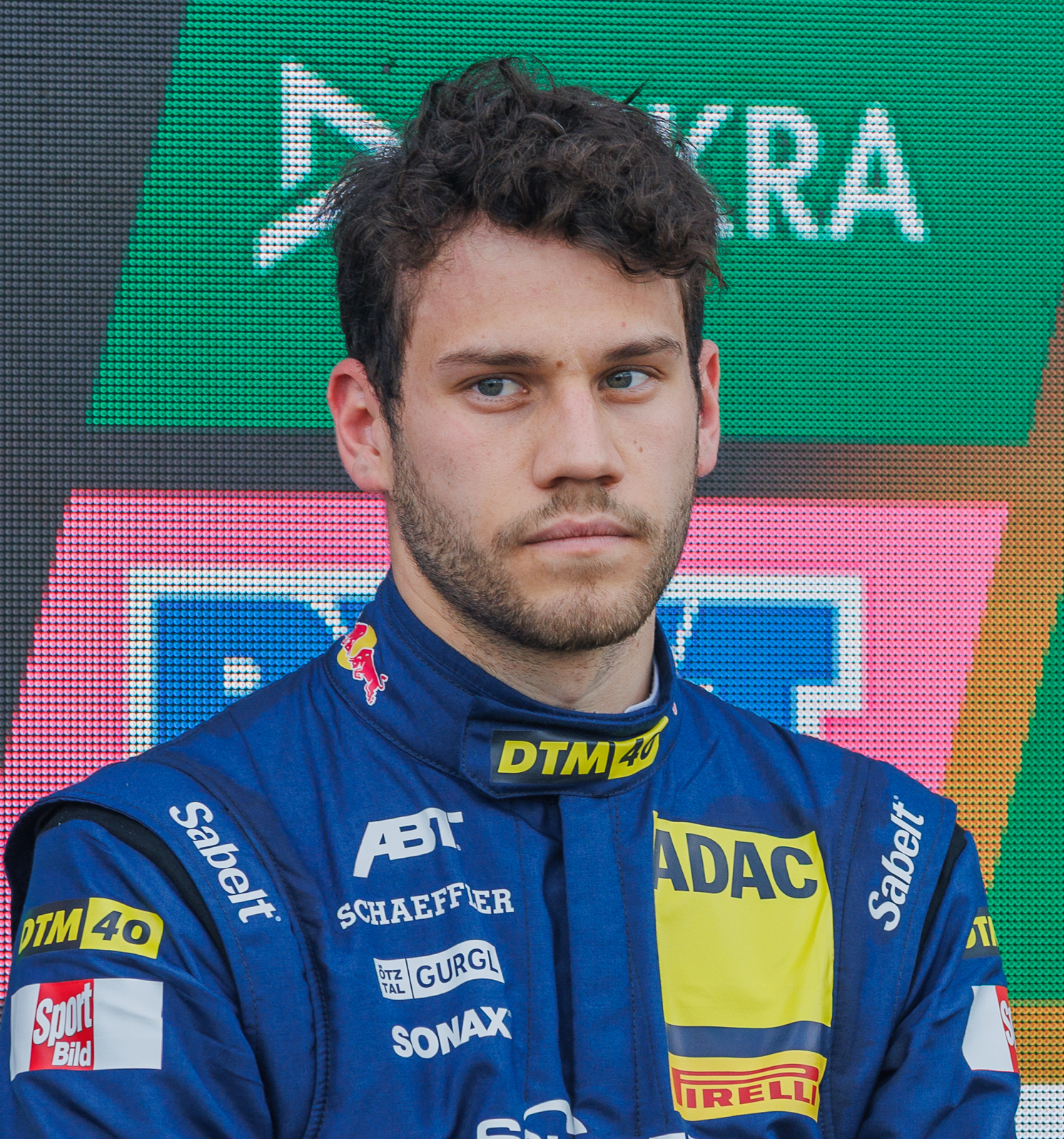
- Feller in 2024
- Nationality: (Switzerland) Swiss
- Born: 1 June 2000 (age 26) Aarau, Switzerland

ADAC GT Masters career
- Debut season: 2017
- Current team: Montaplast by Land-Motorsport
- Categorisation: FIA Silver (until 2021); FIA Gold (2022); FIA Platinum (2023–)
- Car number: 29
- Former teams: BWT Mücke Motorsport; Audi Sport Racing Academy
- Starts: 78
- Wins: 5
- Podiums: 11
- Poles: 3
- Fastest laps: 5

Previous series
- 2018–2019 2016 2016: 24H Series; ADAC Formula 4 Italian F4 Championship

Championship titles
- 2023, 2026 2021 2021: GTWC Europe Sprint Cup; GTWC Europe Endurance Cup – Silver Cup; ADAC GT Masters

Ricardo Feller (born 1 June 2000) is a Swiss racing driver who currently competes in the Deutsche Tourenwagen Masters for Manthey Racing and GT World Challenge Europe for Lionspeed GP. He is a Porsche contracted driver, and previously drove for Audi.

A homegrown Audi talent since age 16, Feller began his career in the ADAC GT Masters and won the title in 2021. He made his DTM debut in 2022, placed third in 2023, and won a fog-shortened Nürburgring 24 Hours in 2024. Upon moving to Porsche, Feller won the 2026 edition of the 12 Hours of Sebring and 24 Hours of Spa. He is a two-time GT World Challenge Europe Sprint Cup champion—in 2023 with Audi and in 2026 with Porsche.

== Career ==
=== Early career ===
Feller began karting in 2011, competing in the Supermini class of the Switzerland-based Bridgestone Cup. The following year, he expanded his karting program, taking second overall in the Supermini class of the 2012 Swiss Karting Championship.

In 2016, at the age of 15, Feller stepped into single-seater formula cars for the first time in his career, joining Mücke Motorsport (branded as ADAC Berlin-Brandenburg) for the 2016 ADAC Formula 4 Championship season.

=== Sports car racing ===
==== Audi drives and factory promotion (2017–2024) ====
For 2017, Feller made the transition to sports car racing, competing in the 2017 ADAC GT Masters alongside teammate Mikaela Åhlin-Kottulinsky with the new-for-2017 Audi Sport Racing Academy team. With his appearance in the opening round, Feller became the youngest driver in series history. Although the duo failed to score a point in 2017, Feller rejoined Mücke Motorsport for the 2018 season, sharing his Audi R8 LMS with Audi factory driver Christopher Haase. Later that year, Feller made his debut in the GT World Challenge Europe, taking part in the Sprint Cup for Belgian Audi Club Team WRT. He and co-driver Adrien de Leener would score their first and only victory of the season at the Nürburgring in September.

To begin 2019, Feller made his debut at the 24 Hours of Daytona, driving for Land Motorsport. This opportunity grew into a full Michelin Endurance Cup campaign for himself and co-drivers Christopher Mies and Daniel Morad. They recorded a best finish of second in the season finale at Road Atlanta. Later that year, Feller scored his first race victory in the ADAC GT Masters at Zandvoort. For 2020, Feller joined Emil Frey Racing, competing in the Pro class of the GT World Challenge Europe Endurance Cup.

After competing with Mücke Motorsport during the 2020 season, Feller returned to Land Motorsport for the 2021 ADAC GT Masters season. Reunited with co-driver Mies, the two claimed three race victories en route to the overall championship, with Feller also taking the Junior categorization title as well. With Emil Frey Racing, Feller scored the 2021 GT World Challenge Europe Endurance Cup Silver class title, driving alongside Alex Fontana and Rolf Ineichen. The trio scored two class victories and three podiums from five races en route to their title.

For 2022, Feller joined Audi Sport's factory roster, taking part in the DTM with Team Abt Sportsline. He had reportedly received multiple offers ahead of the 2022 season, but elected to sign a factory contract with Audi. At Imola in June, he claimed his first career DTM pole. He would go on to win that race, in the process scoring his first series victory. Feller would score one additional podium in 2022, finishing 15th in the championship. Following his rookie season, Feller stated he was pleased with the year, and believed that the team had potential in the near future to challenge more frequently for race victories. Outside of his DTM commitments, Feller competed part-time in the ADAC GT Masters, driving for Land-Motorsport alongside Jusuf Owega when DTM and GT Masters dates didn't clash. His Audi factory driver duties also saw him take part in several one-off endurance events, including the Bathurst 12 Hour with The Bend Motorsport Park Team Valvoline, the 24 Hours of Spa with Attempto Racing, and the 24 Hours of Nürburgring with Team Phoenix. For the final round of the 2022 GT World Challenge Europe Endurance Cup, he deputized for Team WRT's Kelvin van der Linde, who was unwell.

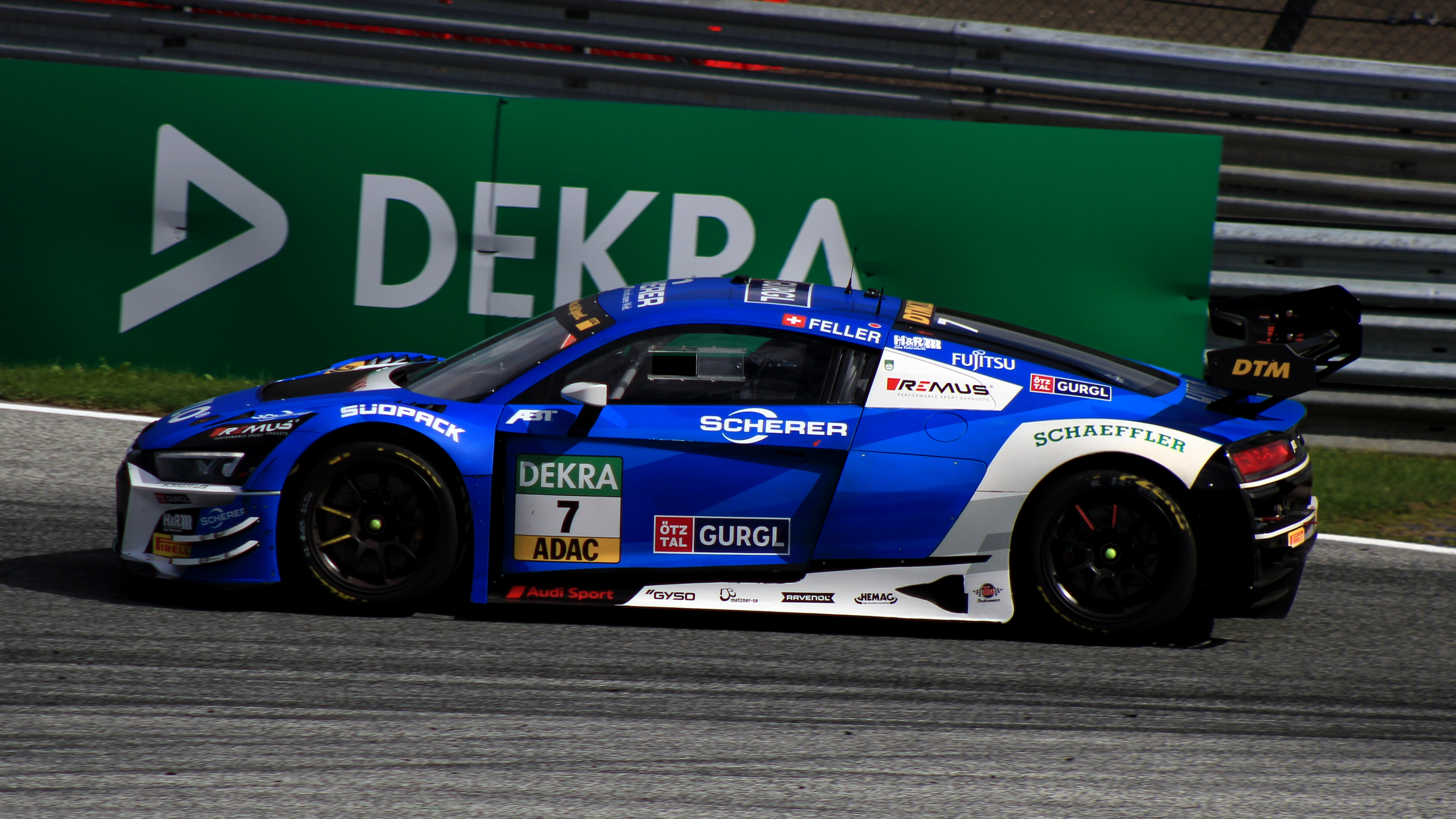
Feller's DTM Audi at the Red Bull Ring in 2023.

Feller began his 2023 campaign at the Bathurst 12 Hour, finishing second in the Pro-Am class where he shared his Audi with Yasser Shahin and Christopher Mies. He returned to his factory driver duties at the Kyalami 9 Hours, where he finished third overall alongside co-drivers Mattia Drudi and Patric Niederhauser. His partnership with Drudi continued throughout the 2023 season, where the two shared Tresor Orange1's Audi for the full GT World Challenge Europe campaign. Fellow factory driver Dennis Marschall joined the entry for the Endurance Cup. In Sprint Cup competition, Feller and Drudi claimed four race victories, including a sweep of the season finale weekend at Zandvoort, claiming the overall title by 19 points over Raffaele Marciello and Timur Boguslavskiy. The Endurance Cup saw Feller claim one podium finish, finishing fifth in the championship. In late February, Feller's return to DTM for a second season was confirmed, where he would again drive for Abt Sportsline. Feller claimed a single race victory, adding two further podium finishes en route to a third-place championship finish.

In 2024, Feller formed part of the Scherer Sport PHX team that won the shortest Nürburgring 24H in history, after over half of the race was red-flagged due to fog. Feller additionally returned for a third season of DTM competition in 2024, continuing with Abt Sportsline and Audi. For the first time in his DTM career, Feller would fail to win a race, claiming two podium finishes and ending the season 11th in the points classification. His 2024 program also included a full-time effort in GT World Challenge Europe, encompassing both the Sprint and Endurance cups. The Sprint Cup campaign, alongside Alex Aka, yielded a best finish of fourth at Brands Hatch and a ninth-place championship finish, while the addition of Haase to the lineup for the Endurance Cup saw the trio finish third in the series championship. The combined effort saw Aka and Feller finish third in the overall GT World Challenge Europe standings. Feller concluded the year with his debut at the FIA GT World Cup, where he finished eighth in the feature race.

==== Switch to Porsche (2025–) ====
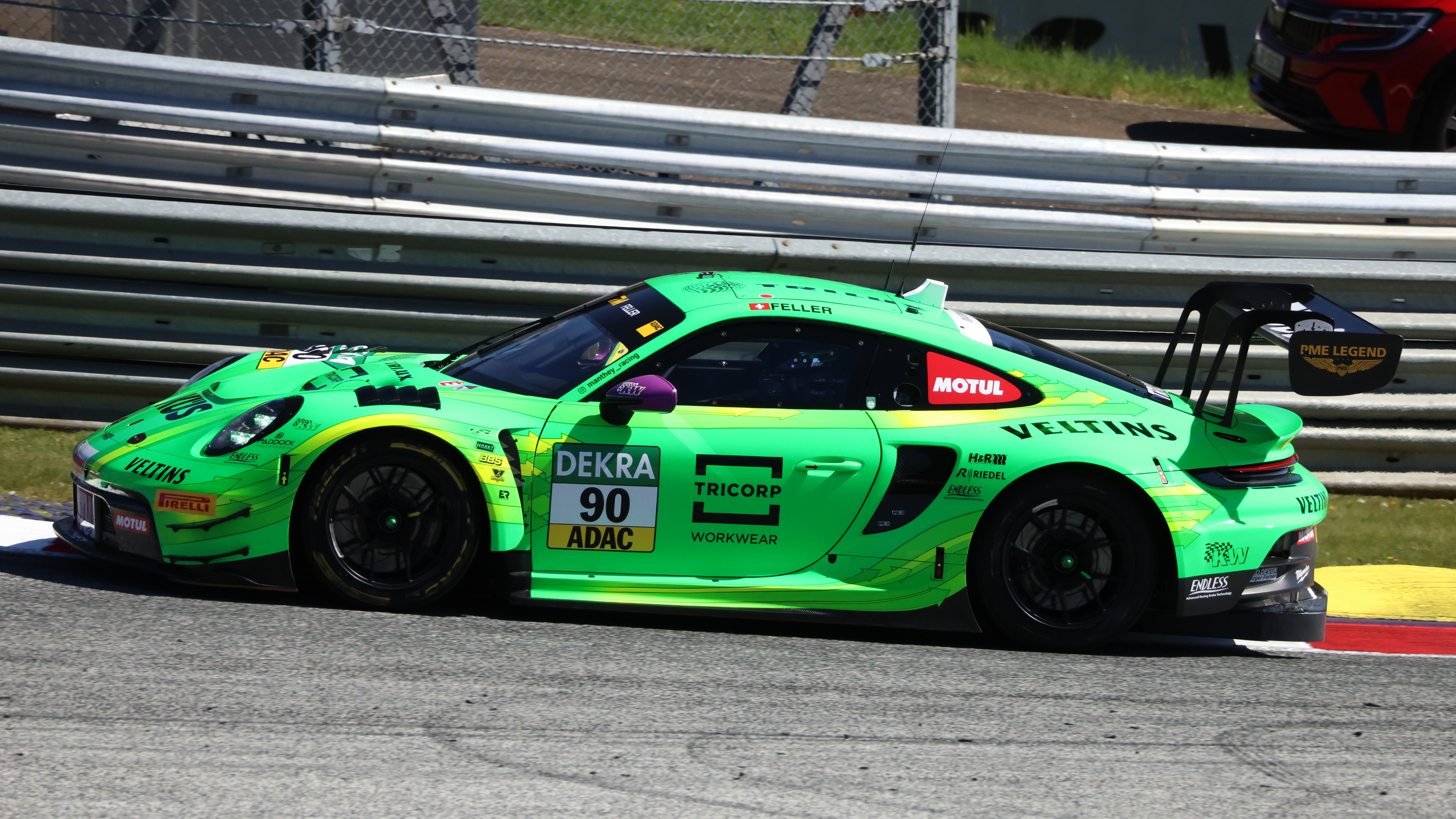
Feller competing with Manthey Racing's Porsche 911 GT3 R during the 2026 DTM round in Red Bull Ring

Following 2024, Feller officially parted ways with Audi, joining Porsche as a contracted driver. Feller was initially set to stay on the DTM grid with his new manufacturer, taking on a program with Allied Racing, however the team shuttered its program prior to the start of the season. In late March, it was announced that Land-Motorsport would field a single Audi R8 LMS Evo II for Feller, keeping both Feller and Audi on the DTM grid for 2025. Feller supplemented his DTM program with a GT World Challenge Europe campaign with Bronze Cup team Lionspeed GP, sharing a Porsche 911 GT3 R (992) with Patrick Kolb and Gabriel Rindone in the Endurance Cup. Feller paired up with Rindone for the season's Sprint Cup.

=== Formula E ===
In May 2024, Feller would make his Formula E debut in the Berlin rookie test, driving for ABT CUPRA.

== Racing record ==
=== Career summary ===
Season	Series	Team	Races	Wins	Poles	F/Laps	Podiums	Points	Position
2016	ADAC Formula 4 Championship	ADAC Berlin-Brandenburg	15	0	0	0	0	0	39th
2016	Italian F4 Championship	Kfzteile24 Mücke Motorsport	3	0	0	0	0	0	45th
2017	ADAC GT Masters	Audi Sport Racing Academy	14	0	0	0	0	0	NC
2018	Blancpain GT Series Endurance Cup	Saintéloc Racing	1	0	0	0	0	0	NC
2018	Blancpain GT Series Sprint Cup	Belgian Audi Club WRT	6	0	0	0	0	1	26th
2018	Blancpain GT Series Sprint Cup - Silver	Belgian Audi Club WRT	6	1	0	0	2	47	6th
2018	ADAC GT Masters	BWT Mücke Motorsport	14	0	0	1	0	45	13th
2018	24H GT Series - A6	BWT Mücke Motorsport	1	0	0	0	0	?	?
2019	ADAC GT Masters	Montaplast by Land-Motorsport	14	1	0	0	3	117	5th
2019	IMSA SportsCar Championship - GTD	Montaplast by Land-Motorsport	4	0	0	0	1	92	28th
2019	Blancpain GT Series Endurance Cup	Montaplast by Land-Motorsport	1	0	0	0	0	0	NC
2019	Intercontinental GT Challenge	Montaplast by Land-Motorsport	1	0	0	0	0	0	NC
2019	24H GT Series - A6	BWT Mücke Motorsport	1	0	0	0	0	?	?
2020	ADAC GT Masters	BWT Mücke Motorsport	13	0	0	0	0	32	25th
2020	GT World Challenge Europe Endurance Cup	Emil Frey Racing	4	0	0	0	0	0	NC
2020	GT World Challenge Europe Sprint Cup	Emil Frey Racing	3	0	1	2	2	24.5	12th
2020	GT World Challenge Europe Sprint Cup - Silver	Emil Frey Racing	3	1	1	3	3	43.5	8th
2020	Intercontinental GT Challenge	Emil Frey Racing	1	0	0	0	0	0	NC
2021	ADAC GT Masters	Montaplast by Land-Motorsport	14	3	3	4	6	199	**1st**
2021	GT World Challenge Europe Endurance Cup	Emil Frey Racing	5	0	0	0	1	19	14th
2021	GT World Challenge Europe Endurance Cup - Silver	Emil Frey Racing	5	2	2	2	3	91	**1st**
2021	GT World Challenge Europe Sprint Cup	Emil Frey Racing	10	1	1	1	3	45.5	4th
2021	GT World Challenge Europe Sprint Cup - Silver	Emil Frey Racing	8	2	2	5	3	75	5th
2021	Intercontinental GT Challenge	Emil Frey Racing	1	0	0	0	0	0	NC
2021	Nürburgring Endurance Series - VT3	Team Mathol Racing	2	2	2	0	2	?	?
2021	Nürburgring Endurance Series - V6	Team Mathol Racing	1	0	0	0	1	?	?
2022	Deutsche Tourenwagen Masters	Team Abt Sportsline	16	1	1	0	2	63	15th
2022	ADAC GT Masters	Montaplast by Land Motorsport	9	1	0	1	2	96	15th
2022	GT World Challenge Europe Endurance Cup	Audi Sport Team Attempto	1	0	0	0	0	0	NC
2022	GT World Challenge Europe Endurance Cup	Belgian Audi Club Team WRT	1	0	0	0	0	0	NC
2022	Intercontinental GT Challenge	The Bend Motorsport Park Team Valvoline	1	0	0	0	0	10	17th
2022	Intercontinental GT Challenge	Audi Sport Team Attempto	1	0	0	0	0	10	17th
2022	Nürburgring Endurance Series - SP9	Scherer Sport Team Phoenix	1	0	0	0	0	0	NC†
2022	24 Hours of Nürburgring - SP9	Scherer Sport Team Phoenix	1	0	0	0	0	N/A	DNF
2023	Deutsche Tourenwagen Masters	Abt Sportsline	16	1	2	2	3	179	**3rd**
2023	GT World Challenge Europe Endurance Cup	Tresor Orange1	5	0	0	0	1	47	5th
2023	GT World Challenge Europe Sprint Cup	Tresor Orange1	10	4	1	1	7	109.5	**1st**
2023	Nürburgring Endurance Series - SP9	Scherer Sport PHX	1	0	0	0	1	0	NC†
2023	24 Hours of Nürburgring - SP9	Scherer Sport PHX	1	0	0	0	0	N/A	11th
2023-24	Middle East Trophy - GT3	Attempto Racing	1	0	0	0	0	0	NC
2024	Deutsche Tourenwagen Masters	Abt Sportsline	16	0	0	1	2	115	11th
2024	GT World Challenge Europe Endurance Cup	Tresor Attempto Racing	5	0	0	0	0	60	**3rd**
2024	GT World Challenge Europe Sprint Cup	Tresor Attempto Racing	10	0	0	1	0	21.5	9th
2024	Nürburgring Langstrecken-Serie - SP9	Scherer Sport PHX	2	0	0	1	1	?	?
2024	24 Hours of Nürburgring - SP9	Scherer Sport PHX	1	1	0	0	1	N/A	**1st**
2024	FIA GT World Cup	FAW Audi Sport Asia Racing Team	1	0	0	0	0	N/A	8th
2025	Deutsche Tourenwagen Masters	Land-Motorsport	16	1	0	1	3	100	11th
2025	GT World Challenge Europe Endurance Cup	Lionspeed GP	5	0	0	0	0	0	NC
2025	GT World Challenge Europe Endurance Cup - Bronze	Lionspeed GP	5	0	0	1	1	62	**3rd**
2025	GT World Challenge Europe Sprint Cup	Lionspeed GP	8	0	0	0	0	0	NC
2025	GT World Challenge Europe Sprint Cup - Bronze	Lionspeed GP	8	0	0	1	0	20	11th
2025	Nürburgring Langstrecken-Serie - SP9	Scherer Sport PHX							
2025	24 Hours of Nürburgring - SP9	Scherer Sport PHX	0	0	0	0	0	N/A	WD
2026	IMSA SportsCar Championship - GTD Pro	Manthey Racing	2	1	0	0	1	658	26th
2026	Deutsche Tourenwagen Masters	Manthey Racing	16	0	0	1	3	121	9th
2026	24 Hours of Nürburgring - SP9	Lionspeed GP	1	0	0	0	0	N/A	4th
2026	GT World Challenge Europe Endurance Cup	Lionspeed GP	5	1	0	0	2	48	**3rd**
2026	GT World Challenge Europe Sprint Cup	Lionspeed GP	10	2	3	1	5	72	**1st**
2026	Intercontinental GT Challenge	Lionspeed GP	2	0	0	0	1	46	7th
2026	Intercontinental GT Challenge	EBM	1	0	0	0	0	46	7th

=== Complete ADAC Formula 4 Championship results ===
(key) (Races in bold indicate pole position) (Races in italics indicate fastest lap)

Year	Team	1	2	3	4	5	6	7	8	9	10	11	12	13	14	15	16	17	18	19	20	21	22	23	24	Pos	Points
2016	ADAC Berlin-Brandenburg	OSC1; 1; 27	OSC1; 2; 26	OSC1; 3; 26	SAC; 1; 22	SAC; 2; 23	SAC; 3; 15	LAU; 1; 22	LAU; 2; 18	LAU; 3; 26	OSC2; 1; 20	OSC2; 2; 25	OSC2; 3 Ret	RBR; 1	RBR; 2	RBR; 3	NÜR; 1	NÜR; 2	NÜR; 3	ZAN; 1	ZAN; 2	ZAN; 3	HOC; 1 Ret	HOC; 2; 20	HOC; 3; 25	39th	0

=== Complete ADAC GT Masters results ===
(key) (Races in bold indicate pole position) (Races in italics indicate fastest lap)

Year	Team	Car	1	2	3	4	5	6	7	8	9	10	11	12	13	14	Pos.	Points
2017	Audi Sport racing academy	Audi R8 LMS	OSC; 1; 17	OSC; 2; 23	LAU; 1; 20	LAU; 2; 20	RBR; 1 Ret	RBR; 2; 17	ZAN; 1; 21	ZAN; 2; 13	NÜR; 1; 22	NÜR; 2; 17	SAC; 1; 18	SAC; 2; 16	HOC; 1; 18	HOC; 2; 12	40th	0
2018	BWT Mücke Motorsport	Audi R8 LMS	OSC; 1; 11	OSC; 2; 10	MST; 1 Ret	MST; 2; 7	RBR; 1; 10	RBR; 2; 14	NÜR; 1; 15	NÜR; 2; 4	ZAN; 1; 10	ZAN; 2; 6	SAC; 1; 7	SAC; 2; 23	HOC; 1; 5	HOC; 2; 12	13th	45
2019	Montaplast by Land-Motorsport	Audi R8 LMS Evo	OSC; 1; 4	OSC; 2; 2	MST; 1; 15	MST; 2; 10	RBR; 1; 12	RBR; 2; 23	ZAN; 1; 11	ZAN; 2; 1	NÜR; 1; 8	NÜR; 2; 18	HOC; 1; 6	HOC; 2; 2	SAC; 1; 12	SAC; 2; 24	5th	117
2020	BWT Mücke Motorsport	Audi R8 LMS Evo	LAU1; 1; 17	LAU1; 2; 22	NÜR; 1; 25	NÜR; 2 Ret	HOC; 1; 11	HOC; 2; 21	SAC; 1; 17	SAC; 2 Ret	RBR; 1; 19	RBR; 2; 11	LAU2; 1; 9	LAU2; 2; 17	OSC; 1; 7	OSC; 2; 10	25th	32
2021	Montaplast by Land-Motorsport	Audi R8 LMS Evo	OSC; 1; 3	OSC; 2; 5	RBR; 1; 12	RBR; 2; 7	**ZAN**; **1**; 1	ZAN; 2 Ret	**LAU**; **1**; 1	LAU; 2; 6	SAC; 1; 3	SAC; 2; 5	HOC; 1; 2	HOC; 2; 7	**NÜR**; **1**; 1	NÜR; 2; 10	**1st**	**199**
2022	Montaplast by Land-Motorsport	Audi R8 LMS Evo II	OSC; 1; 1	OSC; 2; 6	RBR; 1	RBR; 2	ZAN; 1; 4	ZAN; 2 DNS	NÜR; 1; 12	NÜR; 2; 17	LAU; 1; 7	LAU; 2; 13	SAC; 1	SAC; 2	HOC; 1; 8	HOC; 2; 2	15th	96

=== Complete GT World Challenge Europe results ===
==== GT World Challenge Europe Endurance Cup ====
Year	Team	Car	Class	1	2	3	4	5	6	7	Pos.	Points
2018	Saintéloc Racing	Audi R8 LMS	Pro	MNZ	SIL	LEC	SPA; 6H	SPA; 12H	SPA; 24H	CAT; 44	NC	0
2019	Montaplast by Land Motorsport	Audi R8 LMS Evo	Pro	MNZ	SIL	LEC	SPA; 6H; 24	SPA; 12H; 15	SPA; 24H; 14	CAT	NC	0
2020	Emil Frey Racing	Lamborghini Huracán GT3 Evo	Pro	IMO; 11	NÜR; Ret	SPA; 6H; 39	SPA; 12H; 31	SPA; 24H; 16	LEC; 11		NC	0
2021	Emil Frey Racing	Lamborghini Huracán GT3 Evo	Silver	**MNZ**; 3	LEC; 13	**SPA**; **6H**; 14	**SPA**; **12H**; 38	**SPA**; **24H**; 31	NÜR; 8	CAT; 20	**1st**	**91**
2022	Audi Sport Team Attempto	Audi R8 LMS Evo II	Pro	IMO	LEC	SPA; 6H; 36	SPA; 12H; 26	SPA; 24H; 12	HOC		NC	0
2022	Belgian Audi Club Team WRT	Audi R8 LMS Evo II	Pro							CAT; 4	NC	0
2023	Tresor Orange1	Audi R8 LMS Evo II	Pro	MNZ; 5	LEC; Ret	SPA; 6H; 6	SPA; 12H; 1	SPA; 24H; 7	NÜR; 3	CAT; Ret	5th	47
2024	Tresor Attempto Racing	Audi R8 LMS Evo II	Pro	LEC; 6	SPA; 6H; 3	SPA; 12H; 1	SPA; 24H; 12	NÜR; 4	MNZ; 4	JED; 6	3rd	60
2025	Lionspeed GP	Porsche 911 GT3 R (992)	Bronze	LEC; 38	MNZ; 40	SPA; 6H; 42	SPA; 12H; 12	SPA; 24H; 21	NÜR; 33	CAT; 26	3rd	62
2026	Lionspeed GP	Porsche 911 GT3 R (992.2)	Pro	LEC; Ret	MNZ; Ret	SPA; 6H; 15	SPA; 12H; 5	SPA; 24H; 1	NÜR; 15	ALG; 2	3rd	48

^{*}Season still in progress.

==== GT World Challenge Europe Sprint Cup ====
Year	Team	Car	Class	1	2	3	4	5	6	7	8	9	10	Pos.	Points
2018	Belgian Audi Club Team WRT	Audi R8 LMS	Silver	ZOL; 1	ZOL; 2	BRH; 1	BRH; 2	MIS; 1; 10	MIS; 2; 13	HUN; 1; 14	HUN; 2; 10	NÜR; 1; 13	NÜR; 2 Ret	6th	47
2020	Emil Frey Racing	Lamborghini Huracán GT3 Evo	Silver	MIS; 1	MIS; 2	MIS; 3	MAG; 1	MAG; 2	ZAN; 1	ZAN; 2	**CAT**; **1**; 2	CAT; 2; 8	CAT; 3; 3	8th	43.5
2021	Emil Frey Racing	Lamborghini Huracán GT3 Evo	Pro	MAG; 1; 2	MAG; 2; 26									4th	45.5
2021	Emil Frey Racing	Lamborghini Huracán GT3 Evo	Silver			**ZAN**; **1**; 1	ZAN; 2; 2	MIS; 1; 8	MIS; 2; 11	**BRH**; **1**; 14	BRH; 2; 8	VAL; 1; 17	VAL; 2; 12	5th	75
2023	Tresor Orange1	Audi R8 LMS Evo II	Pro	BRH; 1; 2	BRH; 2; 1	MIS; 1; 10	MIS; 2 Ret	HOC; 1; 1	**HOC**; **2**; 4	VAL; 1; 3	VAL; 2; 2	**ZAN**; **1**; 1	ZAN; 2; 1	1st	109.5
2024	Tresor Attempto Racing	Audi R8 LMS Evo II	Pro	BRH; 1; 4	BRH; 2; 4	MIS; 1 Ret	MIS; 2; 26	HOC; 1 Ret	HOC; 2 Ret	MAG; 1; 12	MAG; 2; 6	CAT; 1; 16	CAT; 2; 8	9th	21.5
2025	Lionspeed GP	Porsche 911 GT3 R (992)	Bronze	ZAN; 1; 32	ZAN; 2; 34	MIS; 1; 32	MIS; 2 Ret	MAG; 1; 34	MAG; 2; 34	VAL; 1; 19	VAL; 2; 28			11th	20
2026	Lionspeed GP	Porsche 911 GT3 R (992.2)	Pro	**BRH**; **1** Ret	**BRH**; **2**; 1	MIS; 1; 2	MIS; 2; 20	MAG; 1; 11	MAG; 2; 1	ZAN; 1; 23	ZAN; 2; 2	**CAT**; **1**; 2	CAT; 2; 36	1st	72

^{*}Season still in progress.

=== Complete IMSA SportsCar Championship results ===
(key) (Races in bold indicate pole position)

Year	Team	Class	Make	Engine	1	2	3	4	5	6	7	8	9	10	11	Rank	Points
2019	Montaplast by Land-Motorsport	GTD	Audi R8 LMS Evo	Audi 5.2 L V10	DAY; 22	SEB; 4	MDO	DET	WGL; 8	MOS	LIM	ELK	VIR	LGA	PET; 2	28th	92
2026	Manthey Racing	GTD Pro	Porsche 911 GT3 R (992.2)	Porsche 4.2 L Flat-6	DAY; 5	SEB; 1	LGA	DET	WGL	MOS	ELK	VIR	IMS	PET		26th	658*

=== Complete Deutsche Tourenwagen Masters results ===
(key) (Races in bold indicate pole position) (Races in italics indicate fastest lap)

Year	Entrant	Chassis	1	2	3	4	5	6	7	8	9	10	11	12	13	14	15	16	Rank	Points
2022	Team Abt Sportsline	Audi R8 LMS Evo II	ALG; 1; 6	ALG; 2; 9	LAU; 1 Ret	LAU; 2; 7	IMO; 1 Ret	**IMO**; **2**; 1^{1}	NOR; 1; 8	NOR; 2 Ret	NÜR; 1; 3	NÜR; 2 Ret	SPA; 1; 18	SPA; 2; 13	RBR; 1; 15	RBR; 2; 22	HOC; 1 Ret	HOC; 2; 12	15th	63
2023	Abt Sportsline	Audi R8 LMS Evo II	OSC; 1; 4	OSC; 2; 7	ZAN; 1; 15	**ZAN**; **2**; 1^{1}	NOR; 1; 8	NOR; 2; 14	NÜR; 1; 4^{3}	**NÜR**; **2**; 6^{1}	LAU; 1; 7	LAU; 2; 2^{2}	SAC; 1; 4	SAC; 2; 6	RBR; 1; 3	RBR; 2; 15	HOC; 1; 4	HOC; 2; 9	3rd	179
2024	Red Bull – Team ABT	Audi R8 LMS Evo II	OSC; 1; 3	OSC; 2; 9	LAU; 1; 5^{3}	LAU; 2; 3^{2}	ZAN; 1; 8	ZAN; 2; 11	NOR; 1; 13	NOR; 2; 12	NÜR; 1; 9	NÜR; 2; 8^{2}	SAC; 1 Ret	SAC; 2 Ret	RBR; 1; 10	RBR; 2; 12	HOC; 1; 12	HOC; 2; 6^{3}	11th	115
2025	Land-Motorsport	Audi R8 LMS Evo II	OSC; 1; 21	OSC; 2; 11	LAU; 1 Ret^{2}	LAU; 2; 12	ZAN; 1; 16	ZAN; 2; 16	NOR; 1; 9	NOR; 2; 14	NÜR; 1; 3	NÜR; 2; 20	SAC; 1; 6	SAC; 2; 16	RBR; 1; 17	RBR; 2; 1^{2}	HOC; 1; 2	HOC; 2; 9	11th	100
2026	Manthey Racing	Porsche 911 GT3 R (992.2)	RBR; 1; 9	RBR; 2; 12	ZAN; 1; 10	ZAN; 2; 10	LAU; 1; 3	LAU; 2; 13	NOR; 1; 12	NOR; 2; 12	OSC; 1; 10	OSC; 2; 7	NÜR; 1; 9	NÜR; 2; 11	SAC; 1; 13	SAC; 2; 3^{2}	HOC; 1; 15	HOC; 2; 2^{2}	9th	121

=== Complete 24 Hours of Nürburgring results ===
Year	Team	Co-Drivers	Car	Class	Laps	Pos.	Class Pos.
2022	(Germany) Scherer Sport Team Phoenix	(Germany) Vincent Kolb (Germany) Frank Stippler (South Africa) Kelvin van der Linde	Audi R8 LMS Evo II	SP9 Pro	57	DNF	DNF
2023	(Germany) Scherer Sport PHX	(Italy) Michele Beretta (Germany) Kim-Luis Schramm (Germany) Markus Winkelhock	Audi R8 LMS Evo II	SP9 Pro	160	11th	9th
2024	(Germany) Scherer Sport PHX	(Germany) Dennis Marschall (Germany) Christopher Mies (Germany) Frank Stippler	Audi R8 LMS Evo II	SP9 Pro	50	**1st**	**1st**
2025	(Germany) Scherer Sport PHX	(Switzerland) Patric Niederhauser (France) Patrick Pilet (Belgium) Laurens Vanthoor	Porsche 911 GT3 R (992)	SP9 Pro	—N/a	WD	WD
2026	(Germany) Lionspeed GP	(Germany) Laurin Heinrich (Belgium) Laurens Vanthoor	Porsche 911 GT3 R (992.2)	SP9 Pro	156	5th	4th

=== Complete Bathurst 12 Hour results ===
Year	Team	Co-Drivers	Car	Class	Laps	Pos.	Class Pos.
2022	(Australia) The Bend Motorsport Park Team Valvoline	(Australia) Yasser Shahin (Germany) Markus Winkelhock	Audi R8 LMS Evo II	APA	285	7th	7th
2023	(Australia) The Bend Motorsport Park Team MPC	(Germany) Christopher Mies (Australia) Yasser Shahin	Audi R8 LMS Evo II	Pro-Am	320	9th	**2nd**
2024	(Australia) Wash It – Audi Sport Team MPC	(Australia) Brad Schumacher (Germany) Markus Winkelhock	Audi R8 LMS Evo II	Pro	216	DNF	DNF
2025	(Australia) Jamec Racing	(Australia) Broc Feeney (Australia) Liam Talbot	Audi R8 LMS Evo II	Pro	164	DNF	DNF
2026	(New Zealand) EBM	(Austria) Klaus Bachler (Germany) Laurin Heinrich	Porsche 911 GT3 R (992)	Pro	262	8th	6th

Sporting positions
Preceded by Patrick Kujala; Alex MacDowall; Frederik Schandorff	GT World Challenge Europe Endurance Cup; Silver Cup Champion; 2021; With: Alex Fontana & Rolf Ineichen	Succeeded by Benjamin Goethe; Thomas Neubauer; Jean-Baptiste Simmenauer
Preceded by Michael Ammermüller; Christian Engelhart	ADAC GT Masters; Champion; 2021; With: Christopher Mies	Succeeded by Raffaele Marciello
Preceded by Dries Vanthoor; Charles Weerts	GT World Challenge Europe Sprint Cup; Champion; 2023; With: Mattia Drudi	Succeeded by Maro Engel; Lucas Auer
