= Lionspeed GP =

German sports car racing team

(Germany) Lionspeed GP
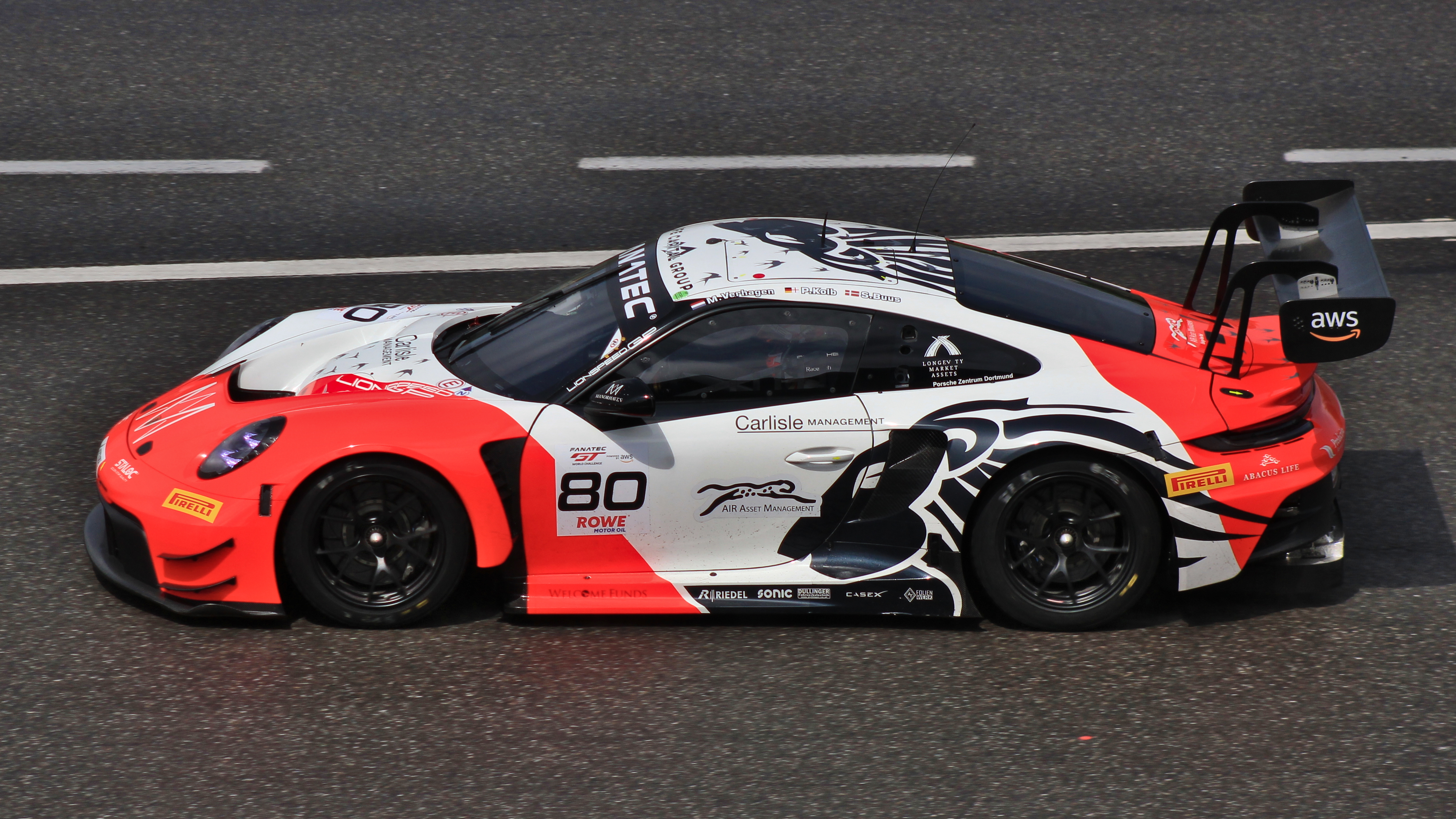
- Founded: 2019
- Base: Bad Homburg, Hesse, Germany
- Team principal(s): Patrick Kolb
- Founder(s): José Garcia; Patrick Kolb
- Current series: 24H Series; GT World Challenge Europe; Nürburgring Langstrecken-Serie
- Former series: International GT Open
- Current drivers: (Denmark) Bastian Buus (Switzerland) Ricardo Feller (Austria) Thomas Preining (Switzerland) Alex Fontana (Germany) Patrick Kolb (Canada) Bashar Mardini
- Drivers' Championships: 2019 VLN SP7, 2020, 2021, 2022 NLS SP9 Pro-Am
- Website: https://www.lionspeedgp.com/

Lionspeed GP is a German sports car racing team established in 2019 by drivers José Garcia and Patrick Kolb. Based in Bad Homburg, Hesse, Germany, the team currently compete in the 24H Series, GT World Challenge Europe, and Nürburgring Langstrecken-Serie. Lionspeed previously raced with operational support from other racing teams, before becoming a fully independent squad in 2024.

The team are former class winners in the Nürburgring 24 Hours, winning the SP9 Pro-Am class in 2020 and 2024.

== History ==
Lionspeed GP's first venture into motor racing came at the 2019 VLN Series, competing with a Huber Motorsport-backed Porsche 911 GT3 Cup. Andreas Simonsen, Lorenzo Rocco Di Torrepadula, and co-founder Patrick Kolb drove the car for the season, with Johannes Stengel and Christoph Rendlen stepping in at select rounds. In that year's 2019 24 Hours of Nürburgring, they competed in the SP7 class, finishing 5th in class and 25th overall. The team made a strong step forward in 2020, with Lionspeed, again backed by Huber Motorsport, taking the SP9 Pro-Am class title in the 2020 Nürburgring Langstrecken-Serie and a class victory in the 2020 24 Hours of Nürburgring. Car Collection Motorsport later supported Lionspeed's operations between 2021 and 2023, exclusively racing in Audi machinery.

After years of racing with operational support, the team transitioned into an independent team in 2024, having established their own team infrastructure. In their first Nürburgring 24 Hours as a standalone entry, Lionspeed won the SP9 Pro-Am class with co-founder Kolb, Antares Au, Indy Dontje, and Patric Niederhauser. The team also raced in the Spa 24 Hours for the first time that year, finishing the 2024 24 Hours of Spa 7th in the Bronze class.

In the 2025 Nürburgring Langstrecken-Serie, Lionspeed supported a Cup 3 class entry with Chris Lulham and four-time Formula One world champion Max Verstappen, driving a power-restricted (mandatory for "rookies" of the circuit) Porsche 718 Cayman GT4 RS Clubsport. The latter had competed to earn a DMSB Permit Nordschleife, a permit necessary for competitors to participate in Group GT3 sports cars at the Nürburgring Nordschleife.

At the 2026 24 Hours of Spa, Lionspeed GP won the race outright with Bastian Buus, Ricardo Feller, and Thomas Preining. They subsequently became the first Spa 24 Hours winner to start from pit lane.

== Race results ==
=== 24 Hours of Spa ===
Year	Entrant	No.	Car	Drivers	Class	Laps	Pos.	Class Pos.
2024	(Germany) Lionspeed x Herberth	80	Porsche 911 GT3 R (992)	(Hong Kong) Antares Au (Switzerland) Alexander Fach (Belgium) Alessio Picariello (Estonia) Martin Rump	Bronze	475	22nd	7th
2025	(Germany) Lionspeed GP	80	Porsche 911 GT3 R (992)	(Switzerland) Ricardo Feller (Germany) Patrick Kolb (Italy) Riccardo Pera (Luxembourg) Gabriel Rindone	Bronze	546	21st	4th
2026	(Germany) Lionspeed GP	80	Porsche 911 GT3 R (992.2)	(Switzerland) Ricardo Feller (Austria) Thomas Preining (Denmark) Bastian Buus	Pro	541	1st	1st
2026	(Germany) Lionspeed GP	89	Porsche 911 GT3 R (992.2)	(Switzerland) Alex Fontana (United Arab Emirates) Bashar Mardini (Zimbabwe) Axcil Jefferies (Germany) Patrick Kolb	Bronze	537	20th	3rd

=== 24 Hours of Nürburgring ===
Year	Entrant	No.	Car	Drivers	Class	Laps	Pos.	Class Pos.
2019	(Germany) Huber Motorsport	63	Porsche 911 GT3 Cup	(Germany) Ulrich Berg (Germany) Patrick Kolb (United States) Jonathan Miller (Germany) Johannes Stengel	SP7	142	25th	5th
2020	(Germany) Huber Motorsport	25	Porsche 911 GT3 R (991.2)	(Germany) Marco Holzer (Germany) Patrick Kolb (Germany) Nico Menzel (Italy) Lorenzo Rocco Di Torrepadula	SP9 Pro-Am	82	15th	1st
2021	(Germany) Lionspeed by Car Collection Motorsport	12	Audi R8 LMS Evo	(Switzerland) Jean-Louis Hertenstein (Germany) Fidel Leib (Germany) Klaus Koch (Germany) Johannes Stengel	SP9	54	30th	21st
2021	(Germany) Lionspeed by Car Collection Motorsport	24	Audi R8 LMS Evo	(Netherlands) Milan Dontje (Germany) Patrick Kolb (Switzerland) Patric Niederhauser (Italy) Lorenzo Rocco Di Torrepadula	SP9	54	24th	20th
2022	(Germany) Lionspeed by Car Collection Motorsport	23	Audi R8 LMS Evo II	(Germany) Dennis Fetzer (Germany) Klaus Koch (Germany) Dennis Marschall (Austria) Simon Reicher	SP9 Pro-Am	154	13th	4th
2022	(Germany) Audi Sport Team Lionspeed by Car Collection	24	Audi R8 LMS Evo II	(Italy) Mattia Drudi (Germany) Patrick Kolb (Germany) Christopher Mies (Switzerland) Patric Niederhauser	SP9 Pro	159	6th	6th
2023	(Germany) Lionspeed by Car Collection Motorsport	24	Porsche 911 GT3 R (992)	(Australia) Matt Campbell (France) Mathieu Jaminet (Germany) Patrick Kolb (France) Patrick Pilet	SP9 Pro	16	DNF	DNF
2024	(Germany) Lionspeed GP	24	Porsche 911 GT3 R (992)	(Hong Kong) Antares Au (Netherlands) Indy Dontje (Germany) Patrick Kolb (Switzerland) Patric Niederhauser	SP9 Pro-Am	50	9th	1st
2026	(Germany) Lionspeed GP	18	Porsche 911 GT3 R (992.2)	(United Kingdom) Jake Hill (Austria) Max Hofer (Germany) Patrick Kolb (United Kingdom) Kyle Tilley	SP9 Pro-Am	153	10th	2nd
2026	(Germany) Lionspeed GP	24	Porsche 911 GT3 R (992.2)	(Switzerland) Ricardo Feller (Germany) Laurin Heinrich (Belgium) Laurens Vanthoor	SP9 Pro	156	5th	4th
