= 2022–23 Le Mans Virtual Series =

The 2022–23 Le Mans Virtual Series was the second season of the Le Mans Virtual Series which is an Esports endurance series. The five-event season began at the Bahrain International Circuit on 17 September 2022 and finished at the Circuit de la Sarthe for the 24 Hours of Le Mans Virtual on 14–15 January 2023.

The series is open for Le Mans Prototype (LMP2) and Le Mans Grand Touring Endurance (LMGTE) classes.

== Calendar ==
Round	Race	Circuit	Location	Date
1	8 Hours of Bahrain	Bahrain International Circuit	Sakhir, Bahrain	17 September 2022
2	4 Hours of Monza	(Italy) Autodromo Nazionale di Monza	Monza, Italy	8 October 2022
3	6 Hours of Spa-Francorchamps	(Belgium) Circuit de Spa-Francorchamps	Spa, Belgium	5 November 2022
4	Sebring 500	(United States) Sebring International Raceway	Sebring, Florida, United States	3 December 2022
5	24 Hours of Le Mans Virtual	(France) Circuit de la Sarthe	Le Mans, France	14–15 January 2023

== Entries ==
The entry list is divided into two categories of vehicles: LMP2 and GTE.

Pro Drivers
Sim Drivers

=== LMP2 ===
Entrant/Team	Chassis	No.	Drivers	Rounds
(Luxembourg) Team Redline	Oreca 07	1	(Netherlands) Jeffrey Rietveld	All
(Luxembourg) Team Redline	Oreca 07	1	(Germany) Maximilian Benecke	1–4
(Luxembourg) Team Redline	Oreca 07	1	(United Kingdom) Luke Bennett	1–2
(Luxembourg) Team Redline	Oreca 07	1	(Netherlands) Max Verstappen	3–5
(Luxembourg) Team Redline	Oreca 07	1	(United Kingdom) Luke Browning	5
(Luxembourg) Team Redline	Oreca 07	1	(Portugal) Diogo Pinto	5
(Luxembourg) Team Redline	Oreca 07	2	(Portugal) Diogo Pinto	1–4
(Luxembourg) Team Redline	Oreca 07	2	(Czech Republic) Michal Smidl	1–3
(Luxembourg) Team Redline	Oreca 07	2	(United Kingdom) Josh Thompson	1–2
(Luxembourg) Team Redline	Oreca 07	2	(United Kingdom) Luke Bennett	3–5
(Luxembourg) Team Redline	Oreca 07	2	(United Kingdom) Luke Browning	4
(Luxembourg) Team Redline	Oreca 07	2	(Brazil) Felipe Drugovich	5
(Luxembourg) Team Redline	Oreca 07	2	(Sweden) Felix Rosenqvist	5
(Luxembourg) Team Redline	Oreca 07	2	(United Kingdom) Chris Lulham	5
(Austria) Floyd Vanwall-Burst	Oreca 07	4	(Denmark) Jesper Pedersen	All
(Austria) Floyd Vanwall-Burst	Oreca 07	4	(Slovenia) Jernej Simončič	All
(Austria) Floyd Vanwall-Burst	Oreca 07	4	(Poland) Damian Skowron	1, 4
(Austria) Floyd Vanwall-Burst	Oreca 07	4	(France) Tom Dillmann	2
(Austria) Floyd Vanwall-Burst	Oreca 07	4	(Netherlands) Bent Viscaal	3, 5
(Austria) Floyd Vanwall-Burst	Oreca 07	4	(Argentina) Franco Colapinto	5
(Austria) Nextview Vanwall-Burst	Oreca 07	444	(Germany) Michi Hoyer	All
(Austria) Nextview Vanwall-Burst	Oreca 07	444	(Poland) Dawid Mroczek	All
(Austria) Nextview Vanwall-Burst	Oreca 07	444	(Brazil) Sérgio Sette Câmara	1
(Austria) Nextview Vanwall-Burst	Oreca 07	444	(Argentina) Esteban Guerrieri	2
(Austria) Nextview Vanwall-Burst	Oreca 07	444	(Poland) Damian Skowron	3
(Austria) Nextview Vanwall-Burst	Oreca 07	444	(United Kingdom) Josh Skelton	4–5
(Austria) Nextview Vanwall-Burst	Oreca 07	444	(United Kingdom) Jonny Edgar	5
(United Kingdom) Williams Esports	Oreca 07	5	(Croatia) Petar Brlijak	All
(United Kingdom) Williams Esports	Oreca 07	5	(United Kingdom) Jack Keithley	All
(United Kingdom) Williams Esports	Oreca 07	5	(Finland) Sami-Matti Trogen	1, 4
(United Kingdom) Williams Esports	Oreca 07	5	(Czech Republic) Martin Stefanko	2–3
(United Kingdom) Williams Esports	Oreca 07	5	(United Kingdom) William Tregurtha	5
(United Kingdom) Williams Esports	Oreca 07	5	(Italy) Tommaso Mosca	5
(United Kingdom) AMG Team Williams Esports	Oreca 07	53	(Poland) Jakub Brzezinski	All
(United Kingdom) AMG Team Williams Esports	Oreca 07	53	(Poland) Nikodem Wisniewski	All
(United Kingdom) AMG Team Williams Esports	Oreca 07	53	(Greece) Michael Romanidis	1–3
(United Kingdom) AMG Team Williams Esports	Oreca 07	53	(Switzerland) Raffaele Marciello	4
(United Kingdom) AMG Team Williams Esports	Oreca 07	53	(Finland) Sami-Matti Trogen	5
(United Kingdom) AMG Team Williams Esports	Oreca 07	53	(Argentina) Agustin Canapino	5
(Germany) AMG Team Petronas Esports	Oreca 07	63	(United Kingdom) James Baldwin	All
(Germany) AMG Team Petronas Esports	Oreca 07	63	(United Kingdom) Graham Carroll	All
(Germany) AMG Team Petronas Esports	Oreca 07	63	(Netherlands) Bono Huis	All
(Germany) AMG Team Petronas Esports	Oreca 07	63	(Spain) Daniel Juncadella	5
(France) R8G Esports	Oreca 07	8	(Hungary) Marcell Csincsik	All
(France) R8G Esports	Oreca 07	8	(North Macedonia) Erhan Jajovski	1–4
(France) R8G Esports	Oreca 07	8	(Czech Republic) Jiri Toman	1–3, 5
(France) R8G Esports	Oreca 07	8	(France) Arthur Rougier	4–5
(France) R8G Esports	Oreca 07	8	(Switzerland) Mathias Beche	5
(France) R8G Esports	Oreca 07	18	(Turkey) Ulas Ozyldirim	All
(France) R8G Esports	Oreca 07	18	(Denmark) Martin Hemmingsen	1–3, 5
(France) R8G Esports	Oreca 07	18	(Sweden) Christopher Högfeldt	1–2
(France) R8G Esports	Oreca 07	18	(France) Romain Grosjean	3–5
(France) R8G Esports	Oreca 07	18	(Switzerland) Mathias Beche	4
(France) R8G Esports	Oreca 07	18	(France) Mathis Poulet	5
(France) Pescarolo Esport Monaco	Oreca 07	16	(Israel) Alon Day	1
(France) Pescarolo Esport Monaco	Oreca 07	16	(France) Thomas Imbourg	1–2
(France) Pescarolo Esport Monaco	Oreca 07	16	(Hungary) Csaba Kiss	1–2
(France) Pescarolo Esport Monaco	Oreca 07	16	(Romania) Robert Paun	2–5
(France) Pescarolo Esport Monaco	Oreca 07	16	(Romania) Darius Andrei	3–5
(France) Pescarolo Esport Monaco	Oreca 07	16	(Hungary) Martin Murguly	3–4
(France) Pescarolo Esport Monaco	Oreca 07	16	(France) Thomas Imbourg	5
(France) Pescarolo Esport Monaco	Oreca 07	16	(France) Romain Boeckler	5
(Germany) Porsche Team Coanda	Oreca 07	20	(United States) Mitchell deJong	All
(Germany) Porsche Team Coanda	Oreca 07	20	(Norway) Tommy Østgaard	1–4
(Germany) Porsche Team Coanda	Oreca 07	20	(United States) Zac Campbell	1, 3
(Germany) Porsche Team Coanda	Oreca 07	20	(Turkey) Ayhancan Güven	2, 4–5
(Germany) Porsche Team Coanda	Oreca 07	20	(Germany) Laurin Heinrich	5
(Germany) Porsche Team Coanda	Oreca 07	20	(Australia) Joshua Rogers	5
(Germany) Porsche Team Coanda	Oreca 07	23	(Netherlands) Mack Bakkum	All
(Germany) Porsche Team Coanda	Oreca 07	23	(Australia) Joshua Rogers	1–4
(Germany) Porsche Team Coanda	Oreca 07	23	(Germany) Martin Krönke	1–3
(Germany) Porsche Team Coanda	Oreca 07	23	(Germany) Laurin Heinrich	4
(Germany) Porsche Team Coanda	Oreca 07	23	(Denmark) Bastian Buus	5
(Germany) Porsche Team Coanda	Oreca 07	23	(Netherlands) Morris Schuring	5
(Germany) Porsche Team Coanda	Oreca 07	23	(Australia) Dayne Warren	5
(Malaysia) SEM9 Axle Sports	Oreca 07	21	(Malaysia) Naquib Azlan	All
(Malaysia) SEM9 Axle Sports	Oreca 07	21	(Philippines) Inigo Anton	1–3
(Malaysia) SEM9 Axle Sports	Oreca 07	21	(Australia) Josh Purwien	1
(Malaysia) SEM9 Axle Sports	Oreca 07	21	(Singapore) Muhammad Aleef	2–5
(Malaysia) SEM9 Axle Sports	Oreca 07	21	(Morocco) Michaël Benyahia	4
(Malaysia) SEM9 Axle Sports	Oreca 07	21	(Malaysia) Alister Yoong	5
(Malaysia) SEM9 Axle Sports	Oreca 07	21	(India) Arjun Maini	5
(United Kingdom) Rocket Simsport	Oreca 07	22	(United Kingdom) Jordan Albert	1
(United Kingdom) Rocket Simsport	Oreca 07	22	(United States) Sean Campbell	1–2
(United Kingdom) Rocket Simsport	Oreca 07	22	(Indonesia) Ferris Stanley	1–2
(United Kingdom) Rocket Simsport	Oreca 07	22	(Malaysia) Mika Hakimi	2–5
(United Kingdom) Rocket Simsport	Oreca 07	22	(United Kingdom) Alex Buncombe	3
(United Kingdom) Rocket Simsport	Oreca 07	22	(Spain) Borja Millan	3–5
(United Kingdom) Rocket Simsport	Oreca 07	22	(United Kingdom) Angus Fender	4–5
(United Kingdom) Rocket Simsport	Oreca 07	22	(Peru) Rodrigo Pflucker	5
(United Kingdom) Le Mans Virtual Cup	Oreca 07	24	(United Kingdom) Andy Priaulx	5
(United Kingdom) Le Mans Virtual Cup	Oreca 07	24	(United Kingdom) Sebastian Priaulx	5
(United Kingdom) Le Mans Virtual Cup	Oreca 07	24	(United Kingdom) Shaun Arnold	5
(United Kingdom) Le Mans Virtual Cup	Oreca 07	24	(Hungary) Zoltán Várkonyi	5
(United Arab Emirates) YAS HEAT Veloce	Oreca 07	28	(Netherlands) Isaac Gillissen	All
(United Arab Emirates) YAS HEAT Veloce	Oreca 07	28	(Germany) Marko Pejic	1–3, 5
(United Arab Emirates) YAS HEAT Veloce	Oreca 07	28	(Republic of Ireland) Eamonn Murphy	1
(United Arab Emirates) YAS HEAT Veloce	Oreca 07	28	(Hungary) Balazs Remenyik	2–4
(United Arab Emirates) YAS HEAT Veloce	Oreca 07	28	(United Kingdom) Sandy Mitchell	4–5
(United Arab Emirates) YAS HEAT Veloce	Oreca 07	28	(Finland) Elias Seppänen	5
Mexico Racing Team	Oreca 07	29	(Mexico) Alberto Gironella	All
Mexico Racing Team	Oreca 07	29	(Mexico) Manuel De Samaniego	1–4
Mexico Racing Team	Oreca 07	29	(Mexico) Alejandro Vargas	1
Mexico Racing Team	Oreca 07	29	(Mexico) Luis Díaz	2–3, 5
Mexico Racing Team	Oreca 07	29	(Mexico) Adolfo Pérez	4–5
Mexico Racing Team	Oreca 07	29	(Mexico) Ricardo Sánchez	5
(France) Alpine eSports	Oreca 07	36	(Netherlands) Colin Spork	All
(France) Alpine eSports	Oreca 07	36	(United States) Rory MacDuff	1–4
(France) Alpine eSports	Oreca 07	36	(France) Tom Lartilleux	1–3, 5
(France) Alpine eSports	Oreca 07	36	(France) Sacha Lehmann	4–5
(France) Alpine eSports	Oreca 07	36	(France) Leo Boulay	5
(France) Alpine eSports	Oreca 07	37	(France) Victor Martins	5
(France) Alpine eSports	Oreca 07	37	(United Kingdom) Olli Caldwell	5
(France) Alpine eSports	Oreca 07	37	(United States) Rory MacDuff	5
(France) Alpine eSports	Oreca 07	37	(Hungary) Patrik Sipos	5
(France) Graff by ATRS eSports	Oreca 07	39	(France) Vincent Capillaire	5
(France) Graff by ATRS eSports	Oreca 07	39	(Greece) Georgios Karakoulas	5
(France) Graff by ATRS eSports	Oreca 07	39	(Denmark) Markus Søholm	5
(France) Graff by ATRS eSports	Oreca 07	39	(Kazakhstan) Lyubov Ozeretskovskaya	5
(Slovakia) ARC Bratislava	Oreca 07	44	(Slovakia) Andrej Marecak	All
(Slovakia) ARC Bratislava	Oreca 07	44	(Slovakia) Jakub Stofko	1–3
(Slovakia) ARC Bratislava	Oreca 07	44	(Slovakia) Erik Vizi	1, 3–5
(Slovakia) ARC Bratislava	Oreca 07	44	(Slovakia) Maťo Homola	2, 5
(Slovakia) ARC Bratislava	Oreca 07	44	(Czech Republic) Tomáš Enge	4, 5
(Australia) Brabham Esports	Oreca 07	62	(Germany) Devin Braune	1–3
(Australia) Brabham Esports	Oreca 07	62	(Malaysia) Mika Hakimi	1
(Australia) Brabham Esports	Oreca 07	62	(Spain) Borja Millan	1
(Australia) Brabham Esports	Oreca 07	62	(Germany) Jan von der Heyde	2–5
(Australia) Brabham Esports	Oreca 07	62	(Belgium) Arne Schoonvliet	2–5
(Australia) Brabham Esports	Oreca 07	62	(United Kingdom) William Dendy	4–5
(Australia) Brabham Esports	Oreca 07	62	(United Kingdom) Gordon Mutch	5
(France) Panis Racing Team	Oreca 07	65	(France) Florian Lebigre	All
(France) Panis Racing Team	Oreca 07	65	(France) Thibault Cazaubon	1–3, 5
(France) Panis Racing Team	Oreca 07	65	(France) Yannick Lapchin	1, 3
(France) Panis Racing Team	Oreca 07	65	(Netherlands) Job van Uitert	2, 4–5
(France) Panis Racing Team	Oreca 07	65	(France) Quentin Vialatte	4
(France) Panis Racing Team	Oreca 07	65	(France) Pierre-Louis Chovet	5
(United Kingdom) GR Vector eSport	Oreca 07	86	(United Kingdom) Daniel Brewer	All
(United Kingdom) GR Vector eSport	Oreca 07	86	(Finland) Jan Granqvist	1–3
(United Kingdom) GR Vector eSport	Oreca 07	86	(United Kingdom) Tom Stevens	1–2
(United Kingdom) GR Vector eSport	Oreca 07	86	(Germany) Jannick Bock	3–5
(United Kingdom) GR Vector eSport	Oreca 07	86	(France) Pierre Courroye	4
(United Kingdom) GR Vector eSport	Oreca 07	86	(United Kingdom) Gus Bowers	5
(United Kingdom) GR Vector eSport	Oreca 07	86	(United Kingdom) Mohan Ritson	5
(United Kingdom) GR Vector eSport	Oreca 07	101	(Italy) Mattia Crupi	1–4
(United Kingdom) GR Vector eSport	Oreca 07	101	(Netherlands) Liam de Waal	1–3, 5
(United Kingdom) GR Vector eSport	Oreca 07	101	(Germany) Phillip Drayss	1
(United Kingdom) GR Vector eSport	Oreca 07	101	(Republic of Ireland) Adam Maguire	2–5
(United Kingdom) GR Vector eSport	Oreca 07	101	(Romania) Alexandru Cascatău	4–5
(United Kingdom) GR Vector eSport	Oreca 07	101	(United States) Andre Castro	5
(France) Peugeot Esports	Oreca 07	93	(United States) Gustavo Menezes	5
(France) Peugeot Esports	Oreca 07	93	(Denmark) Malthe Jakobsen	5
(France) Peugeot Esports	Oreca 07	93	(France) Valentin Mandernach	5
(France) Peugeot Esports	Oreca 07	93	(France) Maxime Brient	5
(Belgium) Arnage Competition	Oreca 07	100	(Hungary) Adam Pinczes	All
(Belgium) Arnage Competition	Oreca 07	100	(Switzerland) Jimmy Antunes	1–3, 5
(Belgium) Arnage Competition	Oreca 07	100	(Hungary) Janos Bracsok	1, 3–4
(Belgium) Arnage Competition	Oreca 07	100	(China) Ye Yifei	2, 5
(Belgium) Arnage Competition	Oreca 07	100	(Slovakia) Dennis Zeťák	4
(Belgium) Arnage Competition	Oreca 07	100	(France) Emilien Carde	5
(United States) Team Fordzilla	Oreca 07	966	(Italy) Gianmarco Fiduci	All
(United States) Team Fordzilla	Oreca 07	966	(Italy) Alessandro Ottaviani	All
(United States) Team Fordzilla	Oreca 07	966	(United Kingdom) Luke Browning	1–2
(United States) Team Fordzilla	Oreca 07	966	(Portugal) Nuno Pinto	3–4
(United States) Team Fordzilla	Oreca 07	966	(Spain) Ramon Piñeiro	5
(United States) Team Fordzilla	Oreca 07	966	(Bulgaria) Georgi Dimitrov	5

=== LMGTE ===
Entrant/Team	Chassis	Engine	No.	Drivers	Rounds
(Germany) MAHLE Racing Team	BMW M8 GTE	BMW P63/1 4.0 L Turbo V8	10	(Italy) Michele D’Alessandro	All
(Germany) MAHLE Racing Team	BMW M8 GTE	BMW P63/1 4.0 L Turbo V8	10	(United Kingdom) Muhammed Patel	All
(Germany) MAHLE Racing Team	BMW M8 GTE	BMW P63/1 4.0 L Turbo V8	10	(Italy) Eros Masciulli	1–3
(Germany) MAHLE Racing Team	BMW M8 GTE	BMW P63/1 4.0 L Turbo V8	10	(Netherlands) Beitske Visser	4–5
(Germany) MAHLE Racing Team	BMW M8 GTE	BMW P63/1 4.0 L Turbo V8	10	(United Kingdom) Jimmy Broadbent	5
(Germany) Project 1 by Dörr Esports	Porsche 911 RSR	Porsche 4.0 L Flat-6	11	(Germany) Leonard Krippner	1–2, 4–5
(Germany) Project 1 by Dörr Esports	Porsche 911 RSR	Porsche 4.0 L Flat-6	11	(Germany) Marc Gassner	1, 3–5
(Germany) Project 1 by Dörr Esports	Porsche 911 RSR	Porsche 4.0 L Flat-6	11	(Germany) Moritz Löhner	2–3, 5
(Germany) Project 1 by Dörr Esports	Porsche 911 RSR	Porsche 4.0 L Flat-6	11	(Germany) Florian Hasse	2–3
(Germany) Project 1 by Dörr Esports	Porsche 911 RSR	Porsche 4.0 L Flat-6	11	(Germany) Alexander Dornieden	2
(Germany) Project 1 by Dörr Esports	Porsche 911 RSR	Porsche 4.0 L Flat-6	11	(Hungary) Norbert Kiss	5
(Denmark) P1 Esports	Porsche 911 RSR	Porsche 4.0 L Flat-6	111	(Denmark) Rasmus Busk	All
(Denmark) P1 Esports	Porsche 911 RSR	Porsche 4.0 L Flat-6	111	(Finland) Turkka Häkkinen	All
(Denmark) P1 Esports	Porsche 911 RSR	Porsche 4.0 L Flat-6	111	(Denmark) Marcus Jensen	1–2, 4
(Denmark) P1 Esports	Porsche 911 RSR	Porsche 4.0 L Flat-6	111	(Denmark) Frederik Schandorff	3, 5
(Denmark) P1 Esports	Porsche 911 RSR	Porsche 4.0 L Flat-6	111	(Denmark) Oliver Rasmussen	5
(China) Inspeed Racing	Porsche 911 RSR	Porsche 4.0 L Flat-6	25	(China) Li Xiayufei	All
(China) Inspeed Racing	Porsche 911 RSR	Porsche 4.0 L Flat-6	25	(China) Li Yanzhe	All
(China) Inspeed Racing	Porsche 911 RSR	Porsche 4.0 L Flat-6	25	(China) Quan Yaocheng	1–3
(China) Inspeed Racing	Porsche 911 RSR	Porsche 4.0 L Flat-6	25	(China) Lu Wenlong	4–5
(China) Inspeed Racing	Porsche 911 RSR	Porsche 4.0 L Flat-6	25	(Portugal) Rafael Lobato	5
(Italy) SIM Maranello	Ferrari 488 GTE Evo	Ferrari F154CB 3.9 L Turbo V8	26	(Italy) Christian Malghera	All
(Italy) SIM Maranello	Ferrari 488 GTE Evo	Ferrari F154CB 3.9 L Turbo V8	26	(Italy) Andrea Terzi	All
(Italy) SIM Maranello	Ferrari 488 GTE Evo	Ferrari F154CB 3.9 L Turbo V8	26	(Italy) Gianluca Scalvini	1
(Italy) SIM Maranello	Ferrari 488 GTE Evo	Ferrari F154CB 3.9 L Turbo V8	26	(Italy) Lorenzo Arisi	2, 4
(Italy) SIM Maranello	Ferrari 488 GTE Evo	Ferrari F154CB 3.9 L Turbo V8	26	(Italy) Kikko Galbiati	3, 5
(Italy) SIM Maranello	Ferrari 488 GTE Evo	Ferrari F154CB 3.9 L Turbo V8	26	(Italy) Lorenzo Patrese	5
(Italy) SF Velas Esports Team	Ferrari 488 GTE Evo	Ferrari F154CB 3.9 L Turbo V8	51	(Denmark) Kasper Stoltze	All
(Italy) SF Velas Esports Team	Ferrari 488 GTE Evo	Ferrari F154CB 3.9 L Turbo V8	51	(Germany) Christian Michel	All
(Italy) SF Velas Esports Team	Ferrari 488 GTE Evo	Ferrari F154CB 3.9 L Turbo V8	51	(Netherlands) Jordy Zwiers	1–2, 4
(Italy) SF Velas Esports Team	Ferrari 488 GTE Evo	Ferrari F154CB 3.9 L Turbo V8	51	(Denmark) Nicklas Nielsen	3
(Italy) SF Velas Esports Team	Ferrari 488 GTE Evo	Ferrari F154CB 3.9 L Turbo V8	51	(United Kingdom) Oliver Bearman	5
(Italy) SF Velas Esports Team	Ferrari 488 GTE Evo	Ferrari F154CB 3.9 L Turbo V8	51	(South Africa) David Perel	5
(United States) Satellite Racing	Aston Martin Vantage GTE	Aston Martin 4.0 L Turbo V8	64	(Finland) Jimi Nisula	All
(United States) Satellite Racing	Aston Martin Vantage GTE	Aston Martin 4.0 L Turbo V8	64	(Estonia) Henri Sinik	All
(United States) Satellite Racing	Aston Martin Vantage GTE	Aston Martin 4.0 L Turbo V8	64	(United Kingdom) David Pittard	1–3, 5
(United States) Satellite Racing	Aston Martin Vantage GTE	Aston Martin 4.0 L Turbo V8	64	(United Kingdom) James Dziuba	4
(United States) Satellite Racing	Aston Martin Vantage GTE	Aston Martin 4.0 L Turbo V8	64	(Italy) Nello Pastorino	5
(United Arab Emirates) SIMMSA Esports	Ferrari 488 GTE Evo	Ferrari F154CB 3.9 L Turbo V8	66	(Germany) Patrick Schindler	All
(United Arab Emirates) SIMMSA Esports	Ferrari 488 GTE Evo	Ferrari F154CB 3.9 L Turbo V8	66	(Germany) Sebastian Wunsch	1, 3–5
(United Arab Emirates) SIMMSA Esports	Ferrari 488 GTE Evo	Ferrari F154CB 3.9 L Turbo V8	66	(Canada) Ramez Azzam	1–2, 5
(United Arab Emirates) SIMMSA Esports	Ferrari 488 GTE Evo	Ferrari F154CB 3.9 L Turbo V8	66	(Lithuania) Gustas Grinbergas	2–5
(Luxembourg) BMW Team Redline	BMW M8 GTE	BMW P63/1 4.0 L Turbo V8	71	(Italy) Enzo Bonito	All
(Luxembourg) BMW Team Redline	BMW M8 GTE	BMW P63/1 4.0 L Turbo V8	71	(Slovenia) Kevin Siggy	All
(Luxembourg) BMW Team Redline	BMW M8 GTE	BMW P63/1 4.0 L Turbo V8	71	(United Kingdom) Chris Lulham	1–3
(Luxembourg) BMW Team Redline	BMW M8 GTE	BMW P63/1 4.0 L Turbo V8	71	(Netherlands) Rudy van Buren	4–5
(Luxembourg) BMW Team Redline	BMW M8 GTE	BMW P63/1 4.0 L Turbo V8	71	(Italy) Lorenzo Colombo	5
(Germany) BMW Team BS + Competition	BMW M8 GTE	BMW P63/1 4.0 L Turbo V8	89	(United Kingdom) Ibraheem Khan	1–5
(Germany) BMW Team BS + Competition	BMW M8 GTE	BMW P63/1 4.0 L Turbo V8	89	(Finland) Joonas Raivio	1–2
(Germany) BMW Team BS + Competition	BMW M8 GTE	BMW P63/1 4.0 L Turbo V8	89	(Canada) Bruno Spengler	1, 5
(Germany) BMW Team BS + Competition	BMW M8 GTE	BMW P63/1 4.0 L Turbo V8	89	(Slovakia) Alen Terzic	2–5
(Germany) BMW Team BS + Competition	BMW M8 GTE	BMW P63/1 4.0 L Turbo V8	89	(Indonesia) Ferris Stanley	3–4
(Germany) BMW Team BS + Competition	BMW M8 GTE	BMW P63/1 4.0 L Turbo V8	89	(United States) Phillippe Denes	5
(Germany) Proton Coanda Esports	Porsche 911 RSR	Porsche 4.0 L Flat-6	77	(United Kingdom) Charlie Collins	All
(Germany) Proton Coanda Esports	Porsche 911 RSR	Porsche 4.0 L Flat-6	77	(Greece) Paschalis Gkergkis	All
(Germany) Proton Coanda Esports	Porsche 911 RSR	Porsche 4.0 L Flat-6	77	(Australia) Dayne Warren	1–3
(Germany) Proton Coanda Esports	Porsche 911 RSR	Porsche 4.0 L Flat-6	77	(Netherlands) Loek Hartog	4–5
(Germany) Proton Coanda Esports	Porsche 911 RSR	Porsche 4.0 L Flat-6	77	(Brazil) Jeferson Giassi	5
(Germany) Proton Coanda Esports	Porsche 911 RSR	Porsche 4.0 L Flat-6	88	(Netherlands) Kevin van Dooren	All
(Germany) Proton Coanda Esports	Porsche 911 RSR	Porsche 4.0 L Flat-6	88	(Luxembourg) Dylan Pereira	1–2
(Germany) Proton Coanda Esports	Porsche 911 RSR	Porsche 4.0 L Flat-6	88	(Finland) Joni Takanen	1, 3–4
(Germany) Proton Coanda Esports	Porsche 911 RSR	Porsche 4.0 L Flat-6	88	(Norway) Oskar Biksrud	2–4
(Germany) Proton Coanda Esports	Porsche 911 RSR	Porsche 4.0 L Flat-6	88	(South Africa) Raoul Hyman	5
(Germany) Proton Coanda Esports	Porsche 911 RSR	Porsche 4.0 L Flat-6	88	(Germany) Alexander Tauscher	5
(Germany) Proton Coanda Esports	Porsche 911 RSR	Porsche 4.0 L Flat-6	88	(United Kingdom) Bryn Collins	5
(Denmark) Prodrive FYRA Esport	Aston Martin Vantage GTE	Aston Martin 4.0 L Turbo V8	95	(Denmark) Lasse Bak	All
(Denmark) Prodrive FYRA Esport	Aston Martin Vantage GTE	Aston Martin 4.0 L Turbo V8	95	(Denmark) Lasse Sørensen	All
(Denmark) Prodrive FYRA Esport	Aston Martin Vantage GTE	Aston Martin 4.0 L Turbo V8	95	(Denmark) Mikkel Gade	1–3
(Denmark) Prodrive FYRA Esport	Aston Martin Vantage GTE	Aston Martin 4.0 L Turbo V8	95	(Denmark) Andreas Jochimsen	4–5
(Denmark) Prodrive FYRA Esport	Aston Martin Vantage GTE	Aston Martin 4.0 L Turbo V8	95	(Brazil) Caique Oliveira	5
(Austria) Oracle Red Bull Racing	Porsche 911 RSR	Porsche 4.0 L Flat-6	99	(Germany) Dennis Jordan	All
(Austria) Oracle Red Bull Racing	Porsche 911 RSR	Porsche 4.0 L Flat-6	99	(Australia) Cooper Webster	1–2
(Austria) Oracle Red Bull Racing	Porsche 911 RSR	Porsche 4.0 L Flat-6	99	(Netherlands) Yuri Kasdorp	1, 3–5
(Austria) Oracle Red Bull Racing	Porsche 911 RSR	Porsche 4.0 L Flat-6	99	(Germany) Alex Siebel	2–3
(Austria) Oracle Red Bull Racing	Porsche 911 RSR	Porsche 4.0 L Flat-6	99	(Denmark) Dennis Lind	4
(Austria) Oracle Red Bull Racing	Porsche 911 RSR	Porsche 4.0 L Flat-6	99	(United Kingdom) Casper Stevenson	5
(Austria) Oracle Red Bull Racing	Porsche 911 RSR	Porsche 4.0 L Flat-6	99	(United States) Jaden Conwright	5
(Japan) D’station Racing	Aston Martin Vantage GTE	Aston Martin 4.0 L Turbo V8	777	(Germany) Marc Veit	All
(Japan) D’station Racing	Aston Martin Vantage GTE	Aston Martin 4.0 L Turbo V8	777	(Japan) Toshiya Nojima	1–4
(Japan) D’station Racing	Aston Martin Vantage GTE	Aston Martin 4.0 L Turbo V8	777	(France) Remi Delorme	1–3, 5
(Japan) D’station Racing	Aston Martin Vantage GTE	Aston Martin 4.0 L Turbo V8	777	(United Kingdom) Charlie Fagg	4–5
(Japan) D’station Racing	Aston Martin Vantage GTE	Aston Martin 4.0 L Turbo V8	777	(Portugal) Henrique Chaves	5
(France) R8G Esports	Ferrari 488 GTE Evo	Ferrari F154CB 3.9 L Turbo V8	888	(Fédération Internationale de l'Automobile) Alexander Smolyar (Note: Alexander Smolyar is Russian, but he competes as a neutral competitor using the Fédération Internationale de l'Automobile flag as Russian national emblems were banned by the association due to the Russian invasion of Ukraine.)	All
(France) R8G Esports	Ferrari 488 GTE Evo	Ferrari F154CB 3.9 L Turbo V8	888	(Estonia) Risto Kappet	1–4
(France) R8G Esports	Ferrari 488 GTE Evo	Ferrari F154CB 3.9 L Turbo V8	888	(North Macedonia) Timotej Andonovski	1–3, 5
(France) R8G Esports	Ferrari 488 GTE Evo	Ferrari F154CB 3.9 L Turbo V8	888	(Denmark) Martin Hemmingsen	4
(France) R8G Esports	Ferrari 488 GTE Evo	Ferrari F154CB 3.9 L Turbo V8	888	(Australia) Scott Andrews	5
(France) R8G Esports	Ferrari 488 GTE Evo	Ferrari F154CB 3.9 L Turbo V8	888	(North Macedonia) Erhan Jajovski	5
(Singapore) LOR JMX Phantom	Aston Martin Vantage GTE	Aston Martin 4.0 L Turbo V8	889	(Indonesia) Presley Martono	5
(Singapore) LOR JMX Phantom	Aston Martin Vantage GTE	Aston Martin 4.0 L Turbo V8	889	(Thailand) Thanathip Tanalapanan	5
(Singapore) LOR JMX Phantom	Aston Martin Vantage GTE	Aston Martin 4.0 L Turbo V8	889	(Indonesia) Andika Rama Maulana	5
(Singapore) LOR JMX Phantom	Aston Martin Vantage GTE	Aston Martin 4.0 L Turbo V8	889	(Indonesia) Fadhli Rachmat	5

== Results ==
Bold indicates overall winner

Rnd.	Circuit	Pole	Fastest Lap	LMP2 Winning Team	LMGTE Winning Team	Results
Rnd.	Circuit	Pole	Fastest Lap	LMP2 Winning Drivers	LMGTE Winning Drivers	Results
1	Bahrain	(Luxembourg) No. 1 Team Redline	(France) No. 36 Alpine eSports	(Austria) **No. 4 Floyd Vanwall-Burst**	(Austria) No. 99 Oracle Red Bull Racing	
1	Bahrain	(Netherlands) Jeffrey Rietveld	(Netherlands) Colin Spork	**(Denmark) Jesper Pedersen** **(Slovenia) Jernej Simončič** **(Poland) Damian Skowron**	(Germany) Dennis Jordan (Australia) Cooper Webster (Netherlands) Yuri Kasdorp	
2	(Italy) Monza	(Germany) No. 20 Porsche Coanda	(Germany) No. 23 Porsche Coanda	(Luxembourg) **No. 1 Team Redline**	(France) No.888 R8G Esports	
2	(Italy) Monza	(United States) Mitchell deJong	(Germany) Martin Krönke	**(Germany) Maximilian Benecke** **(Netherlands) Jeffrey Rietveld** **(United Kingdom) Luke Bennett**	(Fédération Internationale de l'Automobile) Alexander Smolyar (North Macedonia) Timotej Andonovski (Estonia) Risto Kappet	
3	(Belgium) Spa-Francorchamps	(Germany) No. 23 Porsche Coanda	(United Kingdom) No. 5 Williams Esports	(Germany) **No. 63 AMG Team Petronas Esports**	(Luxembourg) No. 71 BMW Team Redline	
3	(Belgium) Spa-Francorchamps	(Australia) Joshua Rogers	(United Kingdom) Jack Keithley	**(United Kingdom) James Baldwin** **(United Kingdom) Graham Carroll** **(Netherlands) Bono Huis**	(Italy) Enzo Bonito (Slovenia) Kevin Siggy (United Kingdom) Chris Lulham	
4	(United States) Sebring	(Germany) No. 23 Porsche Coanda^{1}	(Germany) No. 23 Porsche Coanda	(Germany) **No. 23 Porsche Coanda**	(Luxembourg) No. 71 BMW Team Redline	
4	(United States) Sebring	(Australia) Joshua Rogers^{1}	(Australia) Joshua Rogers	**(Australia) Joshua Rogers** **(Netherlands) Mack Bakkum** **(Germany) Laurin Heinrich**	(Italy) Enzo Bonito (Slovenia) Kevin Siggy (Netherlands) Rudy van Buren	
5	(France) Le Mans	(Germany) No. 20 Porsche Coanda	(United Kingdom) No. 22 Rocket Simsport	(Luxembourg) **No. 2 Team Redline**	(France) No.888 R8G Esports	
5	(France) Le Mans	(Australia) Joshua Rogers	(Malaysia) Mika Hakimi	**(United Kingdom) Luke Bennett** **(Brazil) Felipe Drugovich** **(Sweden) Felix Rosenqvist** **(United Kingdom) Chris Lulham**	(Fédération Internationale de l'Automobile) Alexander Smolyar (North Macedonia) Timotej Andonovski (Australia) Scott Andrews (North Macedonia) Erhan Jajovski	

- **^1** – The **#8 R8G Esports LMP2**, qualified by **Marcell Csincsik** put down the fastest lap of the day, however, they won't be leading the virtual field to the green flag at Sebring. Due to a penalty stemming from an incident at Spa-Francorchamps in the previous month, the **#23 Porsche Coanda** will instead lead the field in the 500 Miles of Sebring. Per the broadcast, Article 17 of the Code of Conduct was breached and therefore all R8G Esports teams would have consequences. With that, all three of the R8G Esports cars in the field will be slapped with 10-place grid penalties for Saturday's event, including the #8 and #18 LMP2s as well as the #888 Ferrari in the GTE category. Moving up from the second spot, **Josh Rogers** laid down the second fastest lap and will be starting from the pole instead with his **#23 Porsche Coanda**.

== Teams' Championships ==
Points are awarded according to the following structure:

Duration	1st	2nd	3rd	4th	5th	6th	7th	8th	9th	10th	Other
0–6 Hours	25	18	15	12	10	8	6	4	2	1	0.5
8–10 Hours	38	27	23	18	15	12	9	6	3	2	1
24 Hours	50	36	30	24	20	16	12	8	4	2	1

=== LMP2 ===
Pos.	Team	Car	BHR (Bahrain)	MNZ (Italy)	SPA (Belgium)	SEB (United States)	LMS (France)	Points
1	(Germany) #20 Porsche Coanda	Oreca 07	4	**5**	4	2	**2**	94
2	(Luxembourg) #1 Team Redline	Oreca 07	**3**	1	2	4	NC	78
3	(Luxembourg) #2 Team Redline	Oreca 07	6	10	8	7	1	73
4	(Austria) #4 Floyd Vanwall-Burst	Oreca 07	1	4	9	6	7	72
5	(United Kingdom) #53 AMG Team Williams Esports	Oreca 07	7	2	5	8	3	71
6	(Germany) #63 AMG Team Petronas Esports	Oreca 07	NC	8	1	3	5	64
7	(Germany) #23 Porsche Coanda	Oreca 07	NC	3	**7**	**1**	6	62
8	(France) #8 R8G Esports	Oreca 07	2	12	3	15	12	44
9	(France) #36 Alpine eSports	Oreca 07	17	6	10	13	4	34.5
10	(Austria) #444 Nextview Vanwall-Burst	Oreca 07	5	7	6	9	13	32
11	(United Kingdom) #62 Brabham Esports	Oreca 07	8	14	20	19	8	15.5
12	(United Kingdom) #5 Williams Esports	Oreca 07	11	9	23	5	22	14.5
13	(France) #65 Panis Racing Team	Oreca 07	9	15	12	10	11	6
14	(United Kingdom) #101 GR Vector eSport	Oreca 07	10	16	15	17	14	4.5
15	(France) #37 Alpine eSports	Oreca 07					9	4
16	(France) #18 R8G Esports	Oreca 07	NC	20	17	18	10	3.5
17	(United Kingdom) #28 YAS HEAT Veloce	Oreca 07	13	13	11	11	21	3.5
18	(Belgium) #100 Arnage Competition	Oreca 07	12	21	18	14	18	3.5
19	(Malaysia) #21 SEM9 Axle Sports	Oreca 07	15	18	24	23	19	3.5
20	(United Kingdom) #86 GR Vector eSport	Oreca 07	16	NC	19	21	15	3
21	#29 Mexico Racing Team	Oreca 07	NC	23	22	24	20	2.5
22	(France) #16 Pescarolo Esport Monaco	Oreca 07	14	19	14	12	NC	2.5
23	(Slovakia) #44 ARC Bratislava	Oreca 07	NC	17	21	22	16	2.5
24	(United Kingdom) #966 Team Fordzilla	Oreca 07	NC	11	13	16	NC	1.5
25	(United Kingdom) #22 Rocket Simsport	Oreca 07	NC	22	16	20	NC	1.5
26	(France) #93 Peugeot Esports	Oreca 07					17	1
27	(France) #39 Graff by ATRS eSports	Oreca 07					23	1
28	(United Kingdom) #24 Le Mans Virtual Cup	Oreca 07					NC	0

Key
Colour	Result
Gold	Race winner
Silver	2nd place
Bronze	3rd place
Green	Points finish
Blue	Non-points finish
Blue	Non-classified finish (NC)
Purple	Did not finish (Ret)
Black	Disqualified (DSQ)
Black	Excluded (EX)
White	Did not start (DNS)
White	Race cancelled (C)
White	Withdrew (WD)
Blank	Did not participate

**Bold** – Pole
Italics – Fastest Lap

=== LMGTE ===
Pos.	Team	Car	BHR (Bahrain)	MNZ (Italy)	SPA (Belgium)	SEB (United States)	LMS (France)	Points
1	(Luxembourg) #71 BMW Team Redline	BMW M8 GTE	**3**	5	**1**	1	2	119
2	(France) #888 R8G Esports	Ferrari 488 GTE	14	**1**	10	8	**1**	81
3	(Italy) #26 SIM Maranello	Ferrari 488 GTE	5	4	11	**2**	6	61.5
4	(Austria) #99 Oracle Red Bull Racing	Porsche 911 RSR GTE	1	13	6	4	10	60.5
5	(Germany) #89 BMW Team BS+Competition	BMW M8 GTE	6	12	9	3	3	59.5
6	(Italy) #51 SF Velas Esports Team	Ferrari 488 GTE	2	8	4	6	13	52
7	(United Arab Emirates) #66 SIMMSA Esports	Ferrari 488 GTE	4	6	8	9	7	44
8	(Denmark) #95 Prodrive FYRA Esport	Aston Martin Vantage GTE	8	2	2	13	12	43.5
9	(Germany) #77 Proton Coanda Esports	Porsche 911 RSR GTE	7	3	3	14	NC	39.5
10	(Germany) #11 Project 1 by Dörr Esports	Porsche 911 RSR GTE	9	14	13	12	4	28.5
11	(Germany) #10 MAHLE Racing Team	BMW M8 GTE	12	9	5	7	9	23
12	(Germany) #88 Proton Coanda Esports	Porsche 911 RSR GTE	13	15	15	11	5	22.5
13	(United States) #64 Satellite Racing	Aston Martin Vantage GTE	15	7	14	16	8	16
14	(Denmark) #111 P1 Esports	Porsche 911 RSR GTE	10	11	12	5	NC	13
15	(Japan) #777 D’station Racing	Aston Martin Vantage GTE	11	10	7	10	14	10
16	(China) #25 Inspeed Racing	Porsche 911 RSR GTE	NC	16	16	15	11	2.5
17	(Singapore) #889 LOR JMX Phantom	Aston Martin Vantage GTE					NC	0

Key
Colour	Result
Gold	Race winner
Silver	2nd place
Bronze	3rd place
Green	Points finish
Blue	Non-points finish
Blue	Non-classified finish (NC)
Purple	Did not finish (Ret)
Black	Disqualified (DSQ)
Black	Excluded (EX)
White	Did not start (DNS)
White	Race cancelled (C)
White	Withdrew (WD)
Blank	Did not participate

**Bold** – Pole
