= Verstappen Sim Racing =

European esports organisation

- Founded: 2000; 26 years ago
- Team history: Team Redline (2000–2026); Verstappen Sim Racing (2026–present)
- Location: Tilburg, Netherlands
- CEO: Atze Kerkhof
- Divisions: F1; iRacing; Rennsport
- Partners: Ascher Racing; Red Bull; Simucube; Verstappen.com
- Website: Official website

Verstappen Sim Racing is a European professional esports organisation based in Tilburg, Netherlands. Founded in 2000 as Team Redline (TRL) by Dom Duhan, the team is one of the most successful organisations in the sim racing video game genre, having amassed several championships and reached top-level success on multiple platforms, including Assetto Corsa, F1, Gran Turismo Sport, iRacing, Rennsport, and rFactor 2. The organisation currently competes in iRacing and Rennsport, and also operate Red Bull Racing's esports team Oracle Red Bull Sim Racing in the Formula One Sim Racing World Championship.

The team are also closely associated with a number of racing drivers, including Formula One drivers Gabriel Bortoleto, who currently serves as an ambassador, and Max Verstappen, who has been a member since 2015 and later absorbed the team into his eponymous Verstappen Racing brand in 2026. Some members have gained opportunities to compete in real world motorsport through their team commitments, most notably Chris Lulham.

== History ==
=== 2000–2016: Early beginnings ===
Team Redline was founded by Dom Duhan in 2000. The team initially began playing a variety of racing games including TOCA Race Driver and Grand Prix Legends, which gradually led to participating in professional tournaments. After many years of competition, they shifted their focus towards the iRacing World Championship Grand Prix Series in 2010, where they would win five world championships with Greger Huttu. In an interview with Gran Turismo fan forum GTPlanet, Duhan stated that Team Redline had collected over 100 professional level victories by 2015 and had developed connections with many racing drivers, including Richie Stanaway, Nicky Catsburg, Kelvin van der Linde, and Max Verstappen. Verstappen would become a formal member of the team that year, and would be integral to Team Redline's growth as an organisation in the coming years.

=== 2016–2026: Continued expansion ===
Heading into 2016, Team Redline formed a Gran Turismo team, signing a handful of players including future Deutsche Tourenwagen Masters champion Ayhancan Güven. One of its members, Mikail "LIGHTNING" Hızal, would go on to win in two disciplines at the 2019 FIA-Certified Gran Turismo Championships as a member of Team Redline, securing the Nations Cup and Toyota GR Supra GT Cup championships in the World Finals at Monte Carlo, Monaco, defeating Igor Fraga and Kanata Kawakami, respectively.

Ahead of the inaugural season of V10 R-League in 2020, an Assetto Corsa round-robin tournament, Team Redline was selected by Porsche to represent their entry in the series. Competing as Porsche24 Redline, the team, consisting of Ben Cornett, Jeffrey Rietveld, Michal Šmídl, and founder Atze Kerkhof, would become champions, defeating Williams Esports in the final match week of the season at Yas Marina Circuit and ending their season with 26 race victories and 6 match wins. At the end of the year, Team Redline was selected by BMW M to become a part of the marque's BMW Motorsport SIM Racing programme. The partnership also included requiring the use of BMW sports cars if available on the selected platform when competing in top-level virtual sports car racing events.

In the 2021–22 Le Mans Virtual Series, Team Redline ran in both the LMP2 and LM GTE classes, the former entry in support of TDS Racing competing as Realteam Hydrogen Redline. The team swept both championships, including a narrow points lead ahead of Williams Esports by half a point, and secured victories in both classes at the signature Le Mans Virtual event held at a virtual Circuit de la Sarthe. Jeffrey Rietveld and Michal Šmídl were joined by Felipe Drugovich and Oliver Rowland as part of the winning LMP2 squad at Le Mans Virtual. The team repeated as LM GTE champions in the 2022–23 Le Mans Virtual Series, however lost the LMP2 championship to Porsche Coanda, after their race at the Le Mans Virtual season finale was plagued with technical problems stemming from security breaches to publisher Studio 397's rFactor 2 servers during the session. Max Verstappen, who was part of the title-rivalling LMP2 team that retired, denounced Studio 397 for the incident, labelling the event a "clown show".

On 12 April 2022, Team Redline was confirmed to represent the Verstappen.com Racing initiative in sim racing launched by Formula One driver and long time team member Max Verstappen and by Red Bull. On 31 October 2023, Team Redline entered a formal partnership with Red Bull's Formula One team Red Bull Racing, which would see the former handle the latter's sim racing operations, including their F1 Esports division. Since then, Team Redline has helped them win their third Teams' championship, as well as securing their first two Drivers' championships in 2023–24 and 2025 with Frederik Rasmussen and Jarno Opmeer (who himself earned a record-setting third Drivers' championship), respectively.

Team Redline was one of the first professional teams to enter the Rennsport competitive scene in 2023, participating in ESL R1 amongst high-profile organizations including the likes of FaZe Clan, G2 Esports, and Mouz. Enzo Bonito, Luke Bennett, Jeffrey Rietveld, and Kevin Siggy formed the team's initial Rennsport roster. On the series' first year, despite finishing runner-up in the Drivers' standings at the inaugural Major to R8G Esports' Marcell Csincsik, Team Redline won the Spring Season Teams' championship. The team would go back-to-back in 2024 with Kevin Siggy winning the 2024 Esports World Cup finale, and again in the 2025 Esports World Cup under a restructured team-based format ahead of runner-ups Virtus.pro and Team Vitality.

=== 2026–present: Verstappen era ===
On 23 March 2026, longtime team member Max Verstappen formally absorbed Team Redline into his eponymous racing team Verstappen Racing, rebranding the team to Verstappen Sim Racing. As part of the transition, the team would become part of Verstappen Racing's driver development ladder ecosystem, providing team members with opportunities to progress towards a real world race seat. Verstappen described the rebrand as a natural step, citing Chris Lulham as an example of sim racing developing real world talent. Team boss Atze Kerkhof described the rebrand as building on Team Redline's legacy, framing Verstappen Sim Racing as part of an era where sim racing serves as a development pathway for real world motorsport talent.

== Current roster ==
As of 2026, Verstappen Sim Racing consists of 13 players.

Verstappen Sim Racing roster
Players
Coaches

Handle	Name	Nationality
	Gustavo Ariel	Brazil
	James Baldwin	United Kingdom
	Enzo Bonito	Italy
LIGHTNING	Mikail Hızal	Turkey
	Sebastian Job	United Kingdom
	Sam Kuitert	Netherlands
	Florian Lebigre	France
	Edoardo Leo	Italy
	Chris Lulham	United Kingdom
	Luke McKeown	United Kingdom
	Diogo Pinto	Portugal
	Kevin Siggy	Slovenia
	Josh Thompson	United Kingdom
	Max Verstappen	Netherlands

Head coach

- Vacant

Legend:
- (I) Inactive
- (S) Suspended
- Substitute
- (injured) Injury / Illness

Roster updated 14 January 2026.
