= 2025 GT World Challenge Europe Sprint Cup =

Motorsports season

The 2025 GT World Challenge Europe Sprint Cup was the thirteenth season of the GT World Challenge Europe Sprint Cup following on from the demise of the SRO Motorsports Group's FIA GT1 World Championship (an auto racing series for grand tourer cars).

The season began on 4 May at Brands Hatch, and ended on 21 September at Circuit Ricardo Tormo.

== Calendar ==
The calendar was released on 28 July 2024 at the SRO's annual 24 Hours of Spa press conference, featuring five rounds. There are two changes from last year, with Circuit Zandvoort and Circuit Ricardo Tormo replacing Hockenheimring and Circuit de Barcelona-Catalunya.

Round	Circuit	Date	Map
1	(United Kingdom) Brands Hatch, Kent	3–4 May	2025 GT World Challenge Europe Sprint Cup is located in Europe
2	(Netherlands) Circuit Zandvoort, Zandvoort	16–18 May	2025 GT World Challenge Europe Sprint Cup is located in Europe
3	(Italy) Misano World Circuit Marco Simoncelli, Misano Adriatico	18–20 July	2025 GT World Challenge Europe Sprint Cup is located in Europe
4	(France) Circuit de Nevers Magny-Cours, Magny-Cours	1–3 August	2025 GT World Challenge Europe Sprint Cup is located in Europe
5	(Spain) Circuit Ricardo Tormo, Cheste	19–21 September	2025 GT World Challenge Europe Sprint Cup is located in Europe

== Entry list ==
Team	Car	No.	Drivers	Class	Rounds
(Austria) GRT - Grasser Racing Team	Lamborghini Huracán GT3 Evo 2	1	(Bulgaria) Georgi Donchev	B	2–3, 5
(Austria) GRT - Grasser Racing Team	Lamborghini Huracán GT3 Evo 2	1	(Germany) Christian Engelhart	B	2–3, 5
(Austria) GRT - Grasser Racing Team	Lamborghini Huracán GT3 Evo 2	19	Ivan Ekelchik (Note: Ekelchik, Mukovoz, Nesov, Salikhov and Gvazava are Russian, but they compete as neutral competitors as Russian national emblems were banned by the FIA following the Russian invasion of Ukraine.)	S	All
(Austria) GRT - Grasser Racing Team	Lamborghini Huracán GT3 Evo 2	19	(Belgium) Baptiste Moulin	S	All
(Austria) GRT - Grasser Racing Team	Lamborghini Huracán GT3 Evo 2	63	(Germany) Luca Engstler	P	All
(Austria) GRT - Grasser Racing Team	Lamborghini Huracán GT3 Evo 2	63	(South Africa) Jordan Pepper	P	All
(Belgium) Boutsen VDS	Mercedes-AMG GT3 Evo	9	(Belgium) Maxime Martin	P	All
(Belgium) Boutsen VDS	Mercedes-AMG GT3 Evo	9	(Germany) Luca Stolz	P	All
(Belgium) Boutsen VDS	Mercedes-AMG GT3 Evo	10	(France) César Gazeau	S	All
(Belgium) Boutsen VDS	Mercedes-AMG GT3 Evo	10	(France) Aurélien Panis	S	All
(Switzerland) Emil Frey Racing	Ferrari 296 GT3	14	(United Kingdom) Ben Green	P	All
(Switzerland) Emil Frey Racing	Ferrari 296 GT3	14	(Finland) Konsta Lappalainen	P	All
(Switzerland) Emil Frey Racing	Ferrari 296 GT3	69	(United Kingdom) Chris Lulham	G	All
(Switzerland) Emil Frey Racing	Ferrari 296 GT3	69	(Netherlands) Thierry Vermeulen	G	All
(Belgium) Comtoyou Racing	Aston Martin Vantage AMR GT3 Evo	11	(Mozambique) Rodrigo Almeida	S	5
(Belgium) Comtoyou Racing	Aston Martin Vantage AMR GT3 Evo	11	(United Kingdom) Jessica Hawkins	S	5
(Belgium) Comtoyou Racing	Aston Martin Vantage AMR GT3 Evo	21	(United Arab Emirates) Jamie Day	S	All
(Belgium) Comtoyou Racing	Aston Martin Vantage AMR GT3 Evo	21	(Belgium) Kobe Pauwels	S	All
(Belgium) Comtoyou Racing	Aston Martin Vantage AMR GT3 Evo	270	(Brazil) Ricardo Baptista	B	2–5
(Belgium) Comtoyou Racing	Aston Martin Vantage AMR GT3 Evo	270	(Brazil) Rafael Suzuki	B	2, 4–5
(Belgium) Comtoyou Racing	Aston Martin Vantage AMR GT3 Evo	270	(Brazil) Sérgio Sette Câmara	B	3
(United Kingdom) Steller Motorsport	Chevrolet Corvette Z06 GT3.R	24	(Belgium) Matisse Lismont	S	1–2
(United Kingdom) Steller Motorsport	Chevrolet Corvette Z06 GT3.R	24	(Finland) Jesse Salmenautio	S	1–2
(France) Saintéloc Racing	Audi R8 LMS Evo II	25	(France) Paul Evrard	G	All
(France) Saintéloc Racing	Audi R8 LMS Evo II	25	(Belgium) Gilles Magnus	G	All
(France) Saintéloc Racing	Audi R8 LMS Evo II	26	(Ukraine) Ivan Klymenko	S	All
(France) Saintéloc Racing	Audi R8 LMS Evo II	26	(Belgium) Lorens Lecertua	S	All
(Qatar) QMMF by Saintéloc Racing	Audi R8 LMS Evo II	27	(Qatar) Ibrahim Al-Abdulghani	B	2–4
(Qatar) QMMF by Saintéloc Racing	Audi R8 LMS Evo II	27	(Qatar) Ghanim Salah Al-Maadheed	B	2–4
(Qatar) QMMF by Saintéloc Racing	Audi R8 LMS Evo II	27	(Qatar) Abdulla Ali Al-Khelaifi	B	5
(Qatar) QMMF by Saintéloc Racing	Audi R8 LMS Evo II	27	(Germany) Julian Hanses	B	5
(Belgium) Team WRT	BMW M4 GT3 Evo	30	(Belgium) Gilles Stadsbader	S	All
(Belgium) Team WRT	BMW M4 GT3 Evo	30	(Sweden) Gustav Bergström	S	1–4
(Belgium) Team WRT	BMW M4 GT3 Evo	30	(Belgium) Matisse Lismont	S	5
(Belgium) Team WRT	BMW M4 GT3 Evo	32	(South Africa) Kelvin van der Linde	P	All
(Belgium) Team WRT	BMW M4 GT3 Evo	32	(Belgium) Charles Weerts	P	All
(Belgium) Team WRT	BMW M4 GT3 Evo	46	(Switzerland) Raffaele Marciello	P	3
(Belgium) Team WRT	BMW M4 GT3 Evo	46	(Italy) Valentino Rossi	P	3
(Oman) AlManar Racing by WRT	BMW M4 GT3 Evo	777	(Oman) Al Faisal Al Zubair	G	All
(Oman) AlManar Racing by WRT	BMW M4 GT3 Evo	777	(Germany) Jens Klingmann	G	All
(Germany) Walkenhorst Motorsport	Aston Martin Vantage AMR GT3 Evo	35	(Portugal) Henrique Chaves	P	All
(Germany) Walkenhorst Motorsport	Aston Martin Vantage AMR GT3 Evo	35	(Ecuador) Mateo Villagómez	P	All
(Austria) Razoon – more than racing	Porsche 911 GT3 R (992)	41	(Austria) Klaus Bachler	P	3
(Austria) Razoon – more than racing	Porsche 911 GT3 R (992)	41	(Denmark) Simon Birch	P	3
(United States) Winward Racing	Mercedes-AMG GT3 Evo	48	(Austria) Lucas Auer	P	All
(United States) Winward Racing	Mercedes-AMG GT3 Evo	48	(Germany) Maro Engel	P	All
(United States) Winward Racing	Mercedes-AMG GT3 Evo	81	Rinat Salikhov	B	2–5
(United States) Winward Racing	Mercedes-AMG GT3 Evo	81	(Italy) Gabriele Piana	B	2–3
(United States) Winward Racing	Mercedes-AMG GT3 Evo	81	(Germany) Marvin Dienst	B	4–5
(Italy) AF Corse - Francorchamps Motors	Ferrari 296 GT3	50	(Monaco) Arthur Leclerc	P	All
(Italy) AF Corse - Francorchamps Motors	Ferrari 296 GT3	50	(France) Thomas Neubauer	P	All
(Italy) AF Corse - Francorchamps Motors	Ferrari 296 GT3	51	(Monaco) Vincent Abril	P	All
(Italy) AF Corse - Francorchamps Motors	Ferrari 296 GT3	51	(Italy) Alessio Rovera	P	All
(Italy) AF Corse - Francorchamps Motors	Ferrari 296 GT3	52	(Belgium) Jef Machiels	S	All
(Italy) AF Corse - Francorchamps Motors	Ferrari 296 GT3	52	(Argentina) Marcos Siebert	S	All
(United Kingdom) Ziggo Sport – Tempesta	Ferrari 296 GT3	93	(Italy) Eddie Cheever III	B	2–5
(United Kingdom) Ziggo Sport – Tempesta	Ferrari 296 GT3	93	(Italy) Marco Pulcini	B	2–5
(United Kingdom) Garage 59	McLaren 720S GT3 Evo	58	(Monaco) Louis Prette	G	All
(United Kingdom) Garage 59	McLaren 720S GT3 Evo	58	(United Kingdom) Adam Smalley	G	1–2
(United Kingdom) Garage 59	McLaren 720S GT3 Evo	58	(United Kingdom) Tom Fleming	G	3–5
(United Kingdom) Garage 59	McLaren 720S GT3 Evo	59	(Germany) Benjamin Goethe	P	All
(United Kingdom) Garage 59	McLaren 720S GT3 Evo	59	(Germany) Marvin Kirchhöfer	P	All
(Germany) HRT Ford Performance	Ford Mustang GT3	64	(France) Romain Andriolo	P	1–4
(Germany) HRT Ford Performance	Ford Mustang GT3	64	(Germany) Jusuf Owega	P	1–4
(Italy) Tresor Attempto Racing	Audi R8 LMS Evo II	66	Andrey Mukovoz	B	2–5
(Italy) Tresor Attempto Racing	Audi R8 LMS Evo II	66	(Luxembourg) Dylan Pereira	B	2–5
(Italy) Tresor Attempto Racing	Audi R8 LMS Evo II	88	(Italy) Leonardo Moncini	G	All
(Italy) Tresor Attempto Racing	Audi R8 LMS Evo II	88	(Denmark) Sebastian Øgaard	G	All
(Italy) Tresor Attempto Racing	Audi R8 LMS Evo II	99	(Germany) Alex Aka	S	All
(Italy) Tresor Attempto Racing	Audi R8 LMS Evo II	99	(Argentina) Ezequiel Pérez Companc	S	1–4
(Italy) Tresor Attempto Racing	Audi R8 LMS Evo II	99	Alexey Nesov	S	5
(Switzerland) Kessel Racing	Ferrari 296 GT3	74	(United States) Dustin Blattner	B	2–5
(Switzerland) Kessel Racing	Ferrari 296 GT3	74	(Germany) Dennis Marschall	B	2–5
(United Kingdom) Barwell Motorsport	Lamborghini Huracán GT3 Evo 2	76	(United States) Christian Bogle	S	1–2
(United Kingdom) Barwell Motorsport	Lamborghini Huracán GT3 Evo 2	76	(Canada) Daniel Ali	S	1
(United Kingdom) Barwell Motorsport	Lamborghini Huracán GT3 Evo 2	76	(United States) Bijoy Garg	S	2
(United Kingdom) Barwell Motorsport	Lamborghini Huracán GT3 Evo 2	76	(United Kingdom) Ricky Collard	G	3–4
(United Kingdom) Barwell Motorsport	Lamborghini Huracán GT3 Evo 2	76	(United States) Bijoy Garg	G	3–4
(United Kingdom) Barwell Motorsport	Lamborghini Huracán GT3 Evo 2	78	(United Kingdom) Hugo Cook	P	All
(United Kingdom) Barwell Motorsport	Lamborghini Huracán GT3 Evo 2	78	(United Kingdom) Sandy Mitchell	P	All
(Germany) Lionspeed GP	Porsche 911 GT3 R (992)	80	(Switzerland) Ricardo Feller	B	2–5
(Germany) Lionspeed GP	Porsche 911 GT3 R (992)	80	(Italy) Gabriel Rindone	B	2–5
(Germany) Lionspeed GP	Porsche 911 GT3 R (992)	89	(Denmark) Bastian Buus	B	2–5
(Germany) Lionspeed GP	Porsche 911 GT3 R (992)	89	(Canada) Bashar Mardini	B	2–5
(Italy) Imperiale Racing	Lamborghini Huracán GT3 Evo 2	85	Dmitry Gvazava	B	2–5
(Italy) Imperiale Racing	Lamborghini Huracán GT3 Evo 2	85	(Italy) Loris Spinelli	B	2–5
(Germany) Rutronik Racing	Porsche 911 GT3 R (992)	96	(Germany) Sven Müller	P	All
(Germany) Rutronik Racing	Porsche 911 GT3 R (992)	96	(Switzerland) Patric Niederhauser	P	All
(Germany) Rutronik Racing	Porsche 911 GT3 R (992)	97	(Netherlands) Loek Hartog	S	All
(Germany) Rutronik Racing	Porsche 911 GT3 R (992)	97	(Sri Lanka) Eshan Pieris	S	All
(France) CSA Racing	McLaren 720S GT3 Evo	111	(France) Simon Gachet	P	1–4
(France) CSA Racing	McLaren 720S GT3 Evo	111	(France) Jim Pla	P	1–4
(France) CSA Racing	McLaren 720S GT3 Evo	111	(France) Loris Cabirou	G	5
(France) CSA Racing	McLaren 720S GT3 Evo	111	(France) Simon Gachet	G	5
(France) CSA Racing	McLaren 720S GT3 Evo	112	(United Kingdom) James Kell	G	1
(France) CSA Racing	McLaren 720S GT3 Evo	112	(France) Arthur Rougier	G	1
(France) CSA Racing	McLaren 720S GT3 Evo	112	(France) Arthur Rougier	B	2–4
(France) CSA Racing	McLaren 720S GT3 Evo	112	(Spain) Isaac Tutumlu	B	2–4
(Italy) UNX Racing	Porsche 911 GT3 R (992)	888	(Belgium) Mathieu Detry	B	3–5
(Italy) UNX Racing	Porsche 911 GT3 R (992)	888	(Belgium) Fabian Duffieux	B	3–5
(United Kingdom) Paradine Competition	BMW M4 GT3 Evo	991	(United Kingdom) Darren Leung	B	2–5
(United Kingdom) Paradine Competition	BMW M4 GT3 Evo	991	(Brazil) Augusto Farfus	B	2
(United Kingdom) Paradine Competition	BMW M4 GT3 Evo	991	(United Kingdom) Dan Harper	B	3
(United Kingdom) Paradine Competition	BMW M4 GT3 Evo	991	(United Kingdom) Jake Dennis	B	4–5
(United Kingdom) Paradine Competition	BMW M4 GT3 Evo	992	(Netherlands) Mex Jansen	S	All
(United Kingdom) Paradine Competition	BMW M4 GT3 Evo	992	(Netherlands) Maxime Oosten	S	All

Icon	Class
P	Pro Cup
G	Gold Cup
S	Silver Cup
B	Bronze Cup

- Matisse Lismont was scheduled to compete for Comtoyou Racing, but switched to Steller Motorsport prior to the start of the season.
- Two cars featured on the season entry list but did not compete: No. 5 Optimum Motorsport McLaren in Gold Cup and No. 65 HRT Ford in Silver Cup. One Group Engineering announced plans to race a Lamborghini but was either not selected or withdrew.

== Race results ==
Round		Circuit	Pole position	Overall winners	Gold winners	Silver winners	Bronze winners	Report
1	R1	(United Kingdom) Brands Hatch	(Switzerland) #69 Emil Frey Racing	(Italy) #51 AF Corse - Francorchamps Motors	(Switzerland) #69 Emil Frey Racing	(Italy) #52 AF Corse - Francorchamps Motors	Did not participate	Report
1	R1	(United Kingdom) Brands Hatch	(United Kingdom) Chris Lulham (Netherlands) Thierry Vermeulen	(Monaco) Vincent Abril (Italy) Alessio Rovera	(United Kingdom) Chris Lulham (Netherlands) Thierry Vermeulen	(Belgium) Jef Machiels (Argentina) Marcos Siebert	Did not participate	Report
1	R2	(United Kingdom) Brands Hatch	(United States) #48 Winward Racing	(United States) #48 Winward Racing	(Oman) #777 AlManar Racing by WRT	(Belgium) #10 Boutsen VDS	Did not participate	Report
1	R2	(United Kingdom) Brands Hatch	(Austria) Lucas Auer (Germany) Maro Engel	(Austria) Lucas Auer (Germany) Maro Engel	(Oman) Al Faisal Al Zubair (Germany) Jens Klingmann	(France) César Gazeau (France) Aurélien Panis	Did not participate	Report
2	R1	(Netherlands) Zandvoort	(Germany) #89 Lionspeed GP	(Germany) #96 Rutronik Racing	(France) #25 Saintéloc Racing	(Italy) #99 Tresor Attempto Racing	(Germany) #89 Lionspeed GP	Report
2	R1	(Netherlands) Zandvoort	(Denmark) Bastian Buus (Canada) Bashar Mardini	(Germany) Sven Müller (Switzerland) Patric Niederhauser	(France) Paul Evrard (Belgium) Gilles Magnus	(Germany) Alex Aka (Argentina) Ezequiel Pérez Companc	(Denmark) Bastian Buus (Canada) Bashar Mardini	Report
2	R2	(Netherlands) Zandvoort	(Switzerland) #14 Emil Frey Racing	(Belgium) #32 Team WRT	(Switzerland) #69 Emil Frey Racing	(France) #26 Saintéloc Racing	(Switzerland) #74 Kessel Racing	Report
2	R2	(Netherlands) Zandvoort	(United Kingdom) Ben Green (Finland) Konsta Lappalainen	(South Africa) Kelvin van der Linde (Belgium) Charles Weerts	(United Kingdom) Chris Lulham (Netherlands) Thierry Vermeulen	(Ukraine) Ivan Klymenko (Belgium) Lorens Lecertua	(United States) Dustin Blattner (Germany) Dennis Marschall	Report
3	R1	(Italy) Misano	(Italy) #51 AF Corse - Francorchamps Motors	(Belgium) #46 Team WRT	(United Kingdom) #58 Garage 59	(Italy) #99 Tresor Attempto Racing	(Switzerland) #74 Kessel Racing	Report
3	R1	(Italy) Misano	(Monaco) Vincent Abril (Italy) Alessio Rovera	(Switzerland) Raffaele Marciello (Italy) Valentino Rossi	(United Kingdom) Tom Fleming (Monaco) Louis Prette	(Germany) Alex Aka (Argentina) Ezequiel Pérez Companc	(United States) Dustin Blattner (Germany) Dennis Marschall	Report
3	R2	(Italy) Misano	(United Kingdom) #59 Garage 59	(United Kingdom) #59 Garage 59	(Switzerland) #69 Emil Frey Racing	(Belgium) #21 Comtoyou Racing	(Italy) #85 Imperiale Racing	Report
3	R2	(Italy) Misano	(Germany) Benjamin Goethe (Germany) Marvin Kirchhöfer	(Germany) Benjamin Goethe (Germany) Marvin Kirchhöfer	(United Kingdom) Chris Lulham (Netherlands) Thierry Vermeulen	(United Arab Emirates) Jamie Day (Belgium) Kobe Pauwels	Dmitry Gvazava (Italy) Loris Spinelli	Report
4	R1	(France) Magny-Cours	(Austria) #63 GRT - Grasser Racing Team	(Austria) #63 GRT - Grasser Racing Team	(United Kingdom) #58 Garage 59	(Belgium) #21 Comtoyou Racing	(Germany) #89 Lionspeed GP	Report
4	R1	(France) Magny-Cours	(Germany) Luca Engstler (South Africa) Jordan Pepper	(Germany) Luca Engstler (South Africa) Jordan Pepper	(United Kingdom) Tom Fleming (Monaco) Louis Prette	(United Arab Emirates) Jamie Day (Belgium) Kobe Pauwels	(Denmark) Bastian Buus (Canada) Bashar Mardini	Report
4	R2	(France) Magny-Cours	(United Kingdom) #59 Garage 59	(United Kingdom) #59 Garage 59	(France) #25 Saintéloc Racing	(Belgium) #21 Comtoyou Racing	(United States) #81 Winward Racing	Report
4	R2	(France) Magny-Cours	(Germany) Benjamin Goethe (Germany) Marvin Kirchhöfer	(Germany) Benjamin Goethe (Germany) Marvin Kirchhöfer	(France) Paul Evrard (Belgium) Gilles Magnus	(United Arab Emirates) Jamie Day (Belgium) Kobe Pauwels	(Germany) Marvin Dienst; Rinat Salikhov	Report
5	R1	(Spain) Valencia	(Switzerland) #74 Kessel Racing	(Austria) #63 GRT - Grasser Racing Team	(United Kingdom) #58 Garage 59	(Belgium) #30 Team WRT	(Switzerland) #74 Kessel Racing	Report
5	R1	(Spain) Valencia	(United States) Dustin Blattner (Germany) Dennis Marschall	(Germany) Luca Engstler (South Africa) Jordan Pepper	(United Kingdom) Tom Fleming (Monaco) Louis Prette	(Belgium) Matisse Lismont (Belgium) Gilles Stadsbader	(United States) Dustin Blattner (Germany) Dennis Marschall	Report
5	R2	(Spain) Valencia	(Austria) #63 GRT - Grasser Racing Team	(Belgium) #32 Team WRT	(Switzerland) #69 Emil Frey Racing	(Belgium) #10 Boutsen VDS	(Germany) #89 Lionspeed GP	Report
5	R2	(Spain) Valencia	(Germany) Luca Engstler (South Africa) Jordan Pepper	(South Africa) Kelvin van der Linde (Belgium) Charles Weerts	(United Kingdom) Chris Lulham (Netherlands) Thierry Vermeulen	(France) César Gazeau (France) Aurélien Panis	(Denmark) Bastian Buus (Canada) Bashar Mardini	Report

== Championship standings ==
Scoring system

Championship points are awarded for the first ten positions in each race. The pole-sitter also receives one point.

Position	1st	2nd	3rd	4th	5th	6th	7th	8th	9th	10th	Pole
Points	16.5	12	9.5	7.5	6	4.5	3	2	1	0.5	1

=== Drivers' championships ===
==== Overall ====
Pos.	Drivers	Team	BRH (United Kingdom)		ZAN (Netherlands)		MIS (Italy)		MAG (France)		VAL (Spain)		Points
1	(South Africa) Kelvin van der Linde (Belgium) Charles Weerts	(Belgium) Team WRT	7	2	5	1	3	5	3	3	Ret	1	88.5
2	(Germany) Luca Engstler (South Africa) Jordan Pepper	(Austria) GRT - Grasser Racing Team	24^{F}	16	2	3	9	11	1^{PF}	2	1	2^{P}	81.5
3	(Germany) Benjamin Goethe (Germany) Marvin Kirchhöfer	(United Kingdom) Garage 59	2	6	6	4	5	1^{P}	9	1^{P}	Ret	3	80
4	(Austria) Lucas Auer (Germany) Maro Engel	(United States) Winward Racing	6	1^{PF}	3	9	4	2^{F}	4	7	3	6	76.5
5	(Germany) Sven Müller (Switzerland) Patric Niederhauser	(Germany) Rutronik Racing	9	3	1	5	7	3	2	5	14	5	69.5
6	(Monaco) Vincent Abril (Italy) Alessio Rovera	(Italy) AF Corse - Francorchamps Motors	1	19	Ret	14	2^{P}	4	Ret	4	20	16	44.5
7	(United Kingdom) Chris Lulham (Netherlands) Thierry Vermeulen	(Switzerland) Emil Frey Racing	3^{P}	9	11	13	Ret	7	22	26	4^{F}	9	23
8	(Monaco) Louis Prette	(United Kingdom) Garage 59	8	15	Ret	25	10	19	6	14	2	15	19
9	(Finland) Konsta Lappalainen (United Kingdom) Ben Green	(Switzerland) Emil Frey Racing	4	5	Ret	11^{P}	8	15	8	13	12	Ret	18.5
10	(Belgium) Maxime Martin (Germany) Luca Stolz	(Belgium) Boutsen VDS	21	20	8	10	18	6	5	6	30	13	17.5
11	(United Kingdom) Tom Fleming	(United Kingdom) Garage 59					10	19	6	14	2	15	17
12	(Monaco) Arthur Leclerc (France) Thomas Neubauer	(Italy) AF Corse - Francorchamps Motors	5	4	9	Ret	Ret	24	12	10	8	19	17
13	(Switzerland) Raffaele Marciello (Italy) Valentino Rossi	(Belgium) Team WRT					1^{F}	21					16.5
14	(Ukraine) Ivan Klymenko (Belgium) Lorens Lecertua	(France) Saintéloc Racing	17	13	14^{F}	2	11	39	21	18	Ret	21	12
15	(France) Paul Evrard (Belgium) Gilles Magnus	(France) Saintéloc Racing	18	26	4	19	12	8	18	8	23	14	11.5
16	(Germany) Alex Aka	(Italy) Tresor Attempto Racing	23	11	10	6	6	30	Ret	21	Ret	12	9.5
16	(Argentina) Ezequiel Pérez Companc	(Italy) Tresor Attempto Racing	23	11	10	6	6	30	Ret	21			9.5
17	(France) César Gazeau (France) Aurélien Panis	(Belgium) Boutsen VDS	13	10	13	12	Ret	10	14	12	Ret	4	8.5
18	(Belgium) Gilles Stadsbader	(Belgium) Team WRT	22	21	Ret	20	19	14	19	22	5	8	8
18	(Belgium) Matisse Lismont	(United Kingdom) Steller Motorsport	26	23	Ret	23							8
18	(Belgium) Matisse Lismont	(Belgium) Team WRT									5	8	8
19	(United Arab Emirates) Jamie Day (Belgium) Kobe Pauwels	(Belgium) Comtoyou Racing	27	14	15	8	17	9	7	9	11	17	7
20	(United Kingdom) Hugo Cook (United Kingdom) Sandy Mitchell	(United Kingdom) Barwell Motorsport	10	7	7	29	16	16	16	11	Ret	18	6.5
21	(Netherlands) Mex Jansen (Netherlands) Maxime Oosten	(United Kingdom) Paradine Competition	12	17	22	7	24	18	17	19	13	7	6
22	(United States) Dustin Blattner (Germany) Dennis Marschall	(Switzerland) Kessel Racing			23	22	15	38	30	24^{F}	6^{P}	25^{F}	5.5
23	(France) Simon Gachet	(France) CSA Racing	16	28	20	17	14	12	10	38	7	26	3.5
24	(Oman) Al Faisal Al Zubair (Germany) Jens Klingmann	(Oman) AlManar Racing by WRT	19	8	12	18	Ret	20	13	17	9	10	3.5
25	(France) Loris Cabirou	(France) CSA Racing									7	26	3
26	(United Kingdom) Adam Smalley	(United Kingdom) Garage 59	8	15	Ret	25							2
27	(Denmark) Bastian Buus (Canada) Bashar Mardini	(Germany) Lionspeed GP			18^{P}	32	28	29	26	28	10	23	1.5
28	(France) Jim Pla	(France) CSA Racing	16	28	20	17	14	12	10	38			0.5
-	(Italy) Jef Machiels (Argentina) Marcos Siebert	(Italy) AF Corse - Francorchamps Motors	11	22	33	16	21	17	11	29	22	20	0
-	(Netherlands) Loek Hartog (Sri Lanka) Eshan Pieris	(Germany) Rutronik Racing	15	Ret	16	28	23	41	20	20	26	11	0
-	(Italy) Leonardo Moncini (Denmark) Sebastian Øgaard	(Italy) Tresor Attempto Racing	14	12	17	15	25	25	15	15	15	22	0
-	Alexey Nesov	(Italy) Tresor Attempto Racing									Ret	12	0
-	(Portugal) Henrique Chaves (Ecuador) Mateo Villagomez	(Germany) Walkenhorst Motorsport	25	18	Ret	27	13	13	23	16	29	27	0
-	(Sweden) Gustav Bergström	(Belgium) Team WRT	22	21	Ret	20	19	14	19	WD			0
-	Rinat Salikhov	(United States) Winward Racing			Ret	30	27	31	27	23	16	34	0
-	(Germany) Marvin Dienst	(United States) Winward Racing							27	23	16	34	0
-	Dmitry Gvazava (Italy) Loris Spinelli	(Italy) Imperiale Racing			26	35	26	26	28	27	17	30	0
-	(Bulgaria) Georgi Donchev (Germany) Christian Engelhart	(Austria) GRT - Grasser Racing Team			27	36	Ret	Ret			18	33	0
-	(United Kingdom) Darren Leung	(United Kingdom) Paradine Competition			19	31	20	37	31	37	Ret	36	0
-	(Switzerland) Ricardo Feller (Italy) Gabriel Rindone	(Germany) Lionspeed GP			32	34	32	Ret	34	34	19	28	0
-	(Brazil) Augusto Farfus	(United Kingdom) Paradine Competition			19	31							0
-	(France) Arthur Rougier	(France) CSA Racing	20	27	24	24^{F}	37	28	Ret	WD			0
-	(United Kingdom) James Kell	(France) CSA Racing	20	27									0
-	(United Kingdom) Dan Harper	(United Kingdom) Paradine Competition					20	37					0
-	Ivan Ekelchik (Belgium) Baptiste Moulin	(Austria) GRT - Grasser Racing Team	29	Ret	21	26	30	32	25	33	21	Ret	0
-	(France) Romain Andriolo (Germany) Jusuf Owega	(Germany) HRT Ford Performance	28	25	Ret	21	22	22	Ret	WD			0
-	(Finland) Jesse Salmenautio	(United Kingdom) Steller Motorsport	26	23	Ret	23							0
-	(Austria) Klaus Bachler (Denmark) Simon Birch	(Austria) Razoon – more than racing					33	23					0
-	(Spain) Isaac Tutumlu	(France) CSA Racing			24	24^{F}	37	28	Ret	WD			0
-	(United States) Bijoy Garg	(United Kingdom) Barwell Motorsport			28	38	Ret	27	24	25			0
-	(United Kingdom) Ricky Collard	(United Kingdom) Barwell Motorsport					Ret	27	24	25			0
-	(Italy) Eddie Cheever III (Italy) Marco Pulcini	(United Kingdom) Ziggo Sport - Tempsta			30	33	31	34	32	32	27	24	0
-	(United States) Christian Bogle	(United Kingdom) Barwell Motorsport	30	24	28	38							0
-	(Belgium) Mathieu Detry (Belgium) Fabian Duffieux	(Italy) UNX Racing					36	35	36	30	24	32	0
-	(Canada) Daniel Ali	(United Kingdom) Barwell Motorsport	30	24									0
-	Andrey Mukovoz (Luxembourg) Dylan Pereira	(Italy) Tresor Attempto Racing			25	40	29	40	29	31	Ret	29	0
-	(Brazil) Ricardo Baptista	(Belgium) Comtoyou Racing			29	37	35	33	33	36	25	37	0
-	(Brazil) Rafael Suzuki	(Belgium) Comtoyou Racing			29	37			33	36	25	37	0
-	(Italy) Gabriele Piana	(United States) Winward Racing			Ret	30	27	31					0
-	(Qatar) Abdulla Al-Khelaifi (Germany) Julian Hanses	(Qatar) QMMF by Saintéloc Racing									28	31	0
-	(Qatar) Ibrahim Al-Abdulghani (Qatar) Ghanim Salah Al-Maadheed	(Qatar) QMMF by Saintéloc Racing			31	39	34	36	35	35			0
-	(United Kingdom) Jake Dennis	(United Kingdom) Paradine Competition							31	37	Ret	36	0
-	(Brazil) Sérgio Sette Câmara	(Belgium) Comtoyou Racing					35	33					0
-	(Mozambique) Rodrigo Almeida (United Kingdom) Jessica Hawkins	(Belgium) Comtoyou Racing									Ret	35	0
Pos.	Drivers	Team	BRH (United Kingdom)		ZAN (Netherlands)		MIS (Italy)		MAG (France)		VAL (Spain)		Points

Key
Colour	Result
Gold	Race winner
Silver	2nd place
Bronze	3rd place
Green	Points finish
Blue	Non-points finish
Blue	Non-classified finish (NC)
Purple	Did not finish (Ret)
Black	Disqualified (DSQ)
Black	Excluded (EX)
White	Did not start (DNS)
White	Race cancelled (C)
White	Withdrew (WD)
Blank	Did not participate

P – Pole
F – Fastest Lap

==== Gold Cup ====
Pos.	Drivers	Team	BRH (United Kingdom)		ZAN (Netherlands)		MIS (Italy)		MAG (France)		VAL (Spain)		Points
1	(United Kingdom) Chris Lulham (Netherlands) Thierry Vermeulen	(Switzerland) Emil Frey Racing	3^{P}	9^{P}	11	13^{P}	Ret^{P}	7	22^{P}	26^{PF}	4^{F}	9	118.5
2	(Monaco) Louis Prette	(United Kingdom) Garage 59	8	15	Ret	25	10	19	6^{F}	12	2^{P}	15^{P}	106
3	(France) Paul Evrard (Belgium) Gilles Magnus	(France) Saintéloc Racing	18	26	4^{P}	19^{F}	12^{F}	8^{P}	18	8	23	14	101.5
4	(Oman) Al Faisal Al Zubair (Germany) Jens Klingmann	(Oman) AlManar Racing by WRT	19	8	12^{F}	18	Ret	20	13	17	9	10	88
5	(Italy) Leonardo Moncini (Denmark) Sebastian Øgaard	(Italy) Tresor Attempto Racing	14^{F}	12	17	15	25	25^{F}	15	15	15	22^{F}	85
6	(United Kingdom) Tom Fleming	(United Kingdom) Garage 59					10	19	6^{F}	12	2^{P}	15^{P}	80.5
7	(United Kingdom) Adam Smalley	(United Kingdom) Garage 59	8	15	Ret	25							25.5
8	(United Kingdom) Ricky Collard (United States) Bijoy Garg	(United Kingdom) Barwell Motorsport					Ret	27	24	25			15
9	(France) Loris Cabirou (France) Simon Gachet	(France) CSA Racing									7	26	14
10	(United Kingdom) James Kell (France) Arthur Rougier	(France) CSA Racing	20	27^{F}									9
Pos.	Drivers	Team	BRH (United Kingdom)		ZAN (Netherlands)		MIS (Italy)		MAG (France)		VAL (Spain)		Points

==== Silver Cup ====
Pos.	Drivers	Team	BRH (United Kingdom)		ZAN (Netherlands)		MIS (Italy)		MAG (France)		VAL (Spain)		Points
1	(United Arab Emirates) Jamie Day (Belgium) Kobe Pauwels	(Belgium) Comtoyou Racing	27	14	15	8	17	9	7^{F}	9^{PF}	11^{P}	17	102
2	(France) César Gazeau (France) Aurélien Panis	(Belgium) Boutsen VDS	13	10^{P}	13	12	Ret	10	14	12	Ret	4^{PF}	96
3	(Germany) Alex Aka	(Italy) Tresor Attempto Racing	23^{F}	11	10^{P}	6	6^{PF}	30^{PF}	Ret	21	Ret	12	77
4	(Netherlands) Mex Jansen (Netherlands) Maxime Oosten	(United Kingdom) Paradine Competition	12	17^{F}	22	7	24	18	17	19	13	7	76
5	(Ukraine) Ivan Klymenko (Belgium) Lorens Lecertua	(France) Saintéloc Racing	17^{P}	13	14^{F}	2^{P}	11	39	21	18	Ret	21	72
6	(Argentina) Ezequiel Pérez Companc	(Italy) Tresor Attempto Racing	23^{F}	11	10^{P}	6	6^{PF}	30^{PF}	Ret	21			71
7	(Belgium) Gilles Stadsbader	(Belgium) Team WRT	22	21	Ret	20	19	14	19	22	5	8	64
8	(Italy) Jef Machiels (Argentina) Marcos Siebert	(Italy) AF Corse - Francorchamps Motors	11	22	33	16	21	17	11^{P}	29	22^{F}	20	62.5
9	(Netherlands) Loek Hartog (Sri Lanka) Eshan Pieris	(Germany) Rutronik Racing	15	Ret	16	28^{F}	23	41	20	20	26	11	42
10	(Sweden) Gustav Bergström	(Belgium) Team WRT	22	21	Ret	20	19	14	19	WD			35
11	(Belgium) Matisse Lismont	(United Kingdom) Steller Motorsport	26	23	Ret	23							32
11	(Belgium) Matisse Lismont	(Belgium) Team WRT									5	8	32
12	Ivan Ekelchik (Belgium) Baptiste Moulin	(Austria) GRT - Grasser Racing Team	29	Ret	21	26	30	32	25	33	21	Ret	21.5
13	Alexey Nesov	(Italy) Tresor Attempto Racing									Ret	12	6
14	(Finland) Jesse Salmenautio	(United Kingdom) Steller Motorsport	26	23	Ret	23							6
15	(United States) Christian Bogle	(United Kingdom) Barwell Motorsport	30	24	28	38							3
16	(United States) Bijoy Garg	(United Kingdom) Barwell Motorsport			28	38							2
17	(Mozambique) Rodrigo Almeida (United Kingdom) Jessica Hawkins	(Belgium) Comtoyou Racing									Ret	35	1
17	(Canada) Daniel Ali	(United Kingdom) Barwell Motorsport	30	24									1
Pos.	Drivers	Team	BRH (United Kingdom)		ZAN (Netherlands)		MIS (Italy)		MAG (France)		VAL (Spain)		Points

==== Bronze Cup ====
Pos.	Drivers	Team	ZAN (Netherlands)		MIS (Italy)		MAG (France)		VAL (Spain)		Points
1	(United States) Dustin Blattner (Germany) Dennis Marschall	(Switzerland) Kessel Racing	23	22^{P}	15^{P}	38^{P}	30	24^{PF}	6^{PF}	25^{F}	92
2	(Denmark) Bastian Buus (Canada) Bashar Mardini	(Germany) Lionspeed GP	18^{P}	32	28	29	26^{F}	28	10	23	87
3	Dmitry Gvazava (Italy) Loris Spinelli	(Italy) Imperiale Racing	26	35	26	26	28	27	17	30	63.5
4	Rinat Salikhov	(United States) Winward Racing	Ret	30	27	31	27	23	16	34	63
5	(Germany) Marvin Dienst	(United States) Winward Racing					27	23	16	34	38.5
6	(United Kingdom) Darren Leung	(United Kingdom) Paradine Competition	19	31	20	37^{F}	31	37	Ret	36^{P}	38
7	(Italy) Eddie Cheever III (Italy) Marco Pulcini	(United Kingdom) Ziggo Sport - Tempsta	30	33	31	34	32	32	27	24	33.5
8	(France) Arthur Rougier (Spain) Isaac Tutumlu	(France) CSA Racing	24	24^{F}	37	28	Ret	WD			31.5
9	Andrey Mukovoz (Luxembourg) Dylan Pereira	(Italy) Tresor Attempto Racing	25	40	29^{F}	40	29	31	Ret	29	30
10	(Italy) Gabriele Piana	(United States) Winward Racing	Ret	30	27	31					24.5
11	(Switzerland) Ricardo Feller (Italy) Gabriel Rindone	(Germany) Lionspeed GP	32^{F}	34	32	Ret	34	34	19	28	20
12	(Brazil) Augusto Farfus	(United Kingdom) Paradine Competition	19	31							19.5
13	(Belgium) Mathieu Detry (Belgium) Fabian Duffieux	(Italy) UNX Racing			36	35	36	30	24	32	15.5
14	(Brazil) Ricardo Baptista	(Belgium) Comtoyou Racing	29	37	35	33	33^{P}	36	25	37	14.5
15	(United Kingdom) Dan Harper	(United Kingdom) Paradine Competition			20	37^{F}					13
16	(Bulgaria) Georgi Donchev (Germany) Christian Engelhart	(Austria) GRT - Grasser Racing Team	27	36	Ret	Ret			18	33	11
17	(Brazil) Rafael Suzuki	(Belgium) Comtoyou Racing	29	37			33^{P}	36	25	37	8
18	(Brazil) Sérgio Sette Câmara	(Belgium) Comtoyou Racing			35	33					6.5
19	(United Kingdom) Jake Dennis	(United Kingdom) Paradine Competition					31	37	Ret	36^{P}	5.5
20	(Qatar) Ibrahim Al-Abdulghani (Qatar) Ghanim Salah Al-Maadheed	(Qatar) QMMF by Saintéloc Racing	31	39	34	36	35	35			5
21	(Qatar) Abdulla Al-Khelaifi (Germany) Julian Hanses	(Qatar) QMMF by Saintéloc Racing							28	31	3.5
Pos.	Drivers	Team	ZAN (Netherlands)		MIS (Italy)		MAG (France)		VAL (Spain)		Points

== See also ==
- 2025 British GT Championship
- 2025 GT World Challenge Europe
- 2025 GT World Challenge Europe Endurance Cup
- 2025 GT World Challenge Asia
- 2025 GT World Challenge America
- 2025 GT World Challenge Australia
- 2025 Intercontinental GT Challenge
