= Chris Lulham =

British racing driver (born 2003)

- Nationality: (United Kingdom) British
- Born: Christopher Lulham; 31 March 2003 (age 23) Coldharbour, Surrey, England

GT World Challenge Europe career
- Debut season: 2025
- Current team: Mercedes-AMG Team Verstappen Racing
- Categorisation: FIA Silver (until 2025); FIA Gold (2026–)
- Car number: 3
- Former teams: Emil Frey Racing
- Starts: 26
- Wins: 0
- Podiums: 3
- Poles: 0
- Fastest laps: 0
- Best finish: 16th in 2026

Previous series
- 2024 2019: Radical Cup UK; F4 British Championship

Championship titles
- 2025–26 2025 2025 2025 2024: Asian Le Mans Series – GT; GTWC Europe – Gold Cup; GTWC Europe Endurance Cup – Gold Cup; GTWC Europe Sprint Cup – Gold Cup; Radical Cup UK – SR3

Christopher Lulham (born 31 March 2003) is a British racing driver and sim racer who last competed in GT World Challenge Europe for Mercedes-AMG Team Verstappen Racing. Lulham spent nine years in karting from 2010 to 2018, winning two titles in X30 and OK karts, before graduating to junior formulae in 2019.

After his junior career, Lulham transitioned to sim racing, becoming a part of esports organisation Team Redline in 2021, who he remains a member with, and finding immediate success in IRacing Special Events and professional series. He returned to racing in 2024, competing in the Radical Cup UK and winning the overall championship. A year later, he was selected to race under the Verstappen.com Racing programme in the 2025 GT World Challenge Europe, later winning the Gold class with Thierry Vermeulen.

== Racing career ==
Lulham began karting in 2010. Racing in karts until 2018, Lulham won the 2016 X30 Euro Series in the Junior category and the 2017 Trofeo Delle Industrie in OK, while also coming runner-up to Dexter Patterson in the Karting World Championship that year in OK-Junior. After spending most of 2019 in sim racing, Lulham joined Fortec Motorsport for a one-off appearance at the Silverstone round of the F4 British Championship. After finishing 11th on debut, Lulham took his first points in race two by finishing seventh, and capped off the weekend with a fifth-place finish in race three.

Five years later, Lulham returned to real life racing by competing in the 2024 Radical Cup UK. In his only season in the series, Lulham won all but two races in the 18 race season to win the SR3 title in dominant fashion. At the start of 2025, it was announced that Lulham would join 2 Seas-run Verstappen.com Racing to compete in the GT World Challenge Europe Endurance Cup and Ferrari-linked Emil Frey Racing to race in the GT World Challenge Europe Sprint Cup, marking his debut in real-life GT3 competition. In the former, Lulham won the 24 Hours of Spa in class and finished on the podium in every race he started to secure the Gold Cup title at the season finale in Barcelona. In the latter, Lulham took four class wins, including an overall podium at Brands Hatch, as well as three more podiums to take the Gold Cup title in Valencia. During 2025, Lulham made his debut in the Nürburgring Langstrecken-Serie, competing at the NLS9 for Emil Frey Racing alongside his GT World Challenge Europe teamowner and friend Max Verstappen, which they won with a dominant lead.

At the end of the year, Lulham joined Kessel Racing to compete in the GT class of the 2025–26 Asian Le Mans Series, winning at Sepang and Dubai as he secured the title. For the rest of 2026, Lulham returned to Europe as he joined Verstappen Racing for a dual campaign in the GT World Challenge Europe Endurance and Sprint Cups. In the Endurance Cup, Lulham scored a lone overall podium at the Nürburgring to take 10th in overall points. In the Sprint Cup, Lulham won race two at Brands Hatch before being relegated to second following a post-race penalty for ignoring yellow flags, en route to 10th in overall points despite missing two rounds as a result of having his appendix removed. During 2026, Lulham also raced with 2 Seas for the final two rounds of British GT, in which he took a best result of second at Donington Park. Continuing with 2 Seas, Lulham raced with them in the GT3 class of the 2026–27 Asian Le Mans Series.

== Esports career ==
Lulham began sim-racing in 2019 and began racing professionally on iRacing a year later. Competing in the British Formula 4 iRacing Trophy in 2020, Lulham won the season-opener at Donington Park, and then took four more wins to take the title over Luke Browning by 14 points. In 2021, Lulham joined Team Redline. In his first year with the team, Lulham won the iRacing Nürburgring 24 Hours, also winning the iRacing Daytona 24 Hours in GTE and winning the VCO ProSIM Series title at the end of the year. After winning the VCO Esports Racing World Cup the following year, Lulham won the 2023 24 Hours of Le Mans Virtual overall and won the second edition of the VCO Esports Racing World Cup.

== Karting record ==
=== Karting career summary ===
Season	Series	Team	Position
2011	Trent Valley Kart Club — Honda Cadet		22nd
2011	Kartmasters British Grand Prix — Honda Cadet		12th
2012	Trent Valley Kart Club — Honda Cadet		22nd
2013	Trent Valley Kart Club — Honda Cadet		23rd
2013	Super 1 National Championship — Honda Cadet		9th
2014	Kartmasters British Grand Prix — Honda Cadet		13th
2014	Super 1 National Championship — Honda Cadet		23rd
2015	Kartmasters British GP — Rotax Mini Max		5th
2015	Super 1 National Championship — Rotax Mini Max		23rd
2016	X30 Challenge Europe — X30 Junior	Fusion Motorsport	8th
2016	IAME Euro Series — X30 Junior	Fusion Motorsport	1st
2016	IAME International Final — X30 Junior		8th
2017	South Garda Winter Cup — OKJ	Piers Sexton Racing	31st
2017	Trofeo delle Industrie — OK	Forza Racing	1st
2017	Kartmasters British Grand Prix — OKJ		12th
2017	IAME Euro Series — X30 Junior		2nd
2017	WSK Super Master Series — OKJ	Piers Sexton Racing	15th
2017	Karting European Championship — OKJ	Piers Sexton Racing	5th
2017	Karting World Championship — OKJ	Forza Racing	2nd
2017	WSK Open Cup — OK	Forza Racing	25th
2018	South Garda Winter Cup — OK	Forza Racing	NC
2018	WSK Super Master Series — OK	Forza Racing	14th
2018	Karting European Championship — OK	Forza Racing	18th

== Racing record ==
=== Racing career summary ===
Season	Series	Team	Races	Wins	Poles	F/Laps	Podiums	Points	Position
2019	F4 British Championship	Fortec Motorsport	3	0	0	0	0	16	15th
2024	Hagerty Radical Cup UK – Pro SR3	Valour Racing	18	16	8	13	17	1245	**1st**
2025	GT World Challenge Europe Endurance Cup	Verstappen.com Racing	5	0	0	0	0	8	21st
2025	GT World Challenge Europe Endurance Cup – Gold	Verstappen.com Racing	5	1	0	0	5	121	**1st**
2025	GT World Challenge Europe Sprint Cup	Emil Frey Racing	10	0	1	0	1	23	7th
2025	GT World Challenge Europe Sprint Cup – Gold	Emil Frey Racing	10	4	6	0	7	118.5	**1st**
2025	Nürburgring Langstrecken-Serie – SP9	Emil Frey Racing	1	1	0	0	1	6	NC
2025	Nürburgring Langstrecken-Serie – Cup 3	Lionspeed GP	2	0	0	0	0	2	NC
2025–26	Asian Le Mans Series – GT	Kessel Racing	6	2	0	0	3	94	**1st**
2025–26	24H Series Middle East – GT3	Grove Racing by GetSpeed	1	0	0	0	0	28	NC
2026	GT World Challenge Europe Endurance Cup	Mercedes-AMG Team Verstappen Racing	5	0	0	0	0	23	10th
2026	GT World Challenge Europe Sprint Cup	Mercedes-AMG Team Verstappen Racing	6	0	0	1	1	26.5	10th
2026	Nürburgring Langstrecken-Serie – SP9	PROsport Racing Team Bilstein	0	0	0	0	0	0	NC
2026	24 Hours of Nürburgring – SP9 Pro	PROsport Racing Team Bilstein	1	0	0	0	0	—N/a	DNF
2026	Nürburgring Langstrecken-Serie – SP10	PROsport Racing	0	0	0	0	0	0	NC
2026	Intercontinental GT Challenge	PROsport Racing Team Bilstein	1	0	0	0	0	0	NC
2026	Intercontinental GT Challenge	Mercedes-AMG Team Verstappen Racing	1	0	0	0	0	0	NC
2026	British GT Championship – GT3	2 Seas Motorsport	2	0	1	0	1	39	11th
2026–27	Asian Le Mans Series – GT3	2 Seas Motorsport							

^{†} As Lulham was a guest driver, he was ineligible for championship points.
^{*} Season still in progress

=== Complete F4 British Championship results ===
(key) (Races in bold indicate pole position) (Races in italics indicate fastest lap)

Year	Team	1	2	3	4	5	6	7	8	9	10	11	12	13	14	15	16	17	18	19	20	21	22	23	24	25	26	27	28	29	30	DC	Points
2019	Fortec Motorsports	BHI; 1	BHI; 2	BHI; 3	DON; 1	DON; 2	DON; 3	THR1; 1	THR1; 2	THR1; 3	CRO; 1	CRO; 2	CRO; 3	OUL; 1	OUL; 2	OUL; 3	SNE; 1	SNE; 2	SNE; 3	THR2; 1	THR2; 2	THR2; 3	KNO; 1	KNO; 2	KNO; 3	SIL; 1; 11	SIL; 2; 7	SIL; 3; 5	BHGP; 1	BHGP; 2	BHGP; 3	15th	16

=== Complete GT World Challenge Europe results ===
==== GT World Challenge Europe Endurance Cup ====
(key) (Races in bold indicate pole position) (Races in italics indicate fastest lap)

Year	Team	Car	Class	1	2	3	4	5	6	7	Pos.	Points
2025	Verstappen.com Racing	Aston Martin Vantage AMR GT3 Evo	Gold	LEC; 9	MNZ; 15	SPA; 6H; 11	SPA; 12H; 10	SPA; 24H; 9	NÜR; 17	CAT; 8	1st	121
2026	Mercedes-AMG Team Verstappen Racing	Mercedes-AMG GT3 Evo	Pro	LEC; 9	MNZ; Ret	SPA; 6H; 10	SPA; 12H; 6	SPA; 24H; Ret	NÜR; 3	ALG; 9	10th	23

==== GT World Challenge Europe Sprint Cup ====
(key) (Races in bold indicate pole position) (Races in italics indicate fastest lap)

Year	Team	Car	Class	1	2	3	4	5	6	7	8	9	10	Pos.	Points
2025	Emil Frey Racing	Ferrari 296 GT3	Gold	**BRH**; **1**; 3	**BRH**; **2**; 9	ZAN; 1; 11	**ZAN**; **2**; 13	**MIS**; **1** Ret	MIS; 2; 7	**MAG**; **1**; 22	**MAG**; **2**; 26	VAL; 1; 4	VAL; 2; 9	1st	118.5
2026	Mercedes-AMG Team Verstappen Racing	Mercedes-AMG GT3 Evo	Pro	BRH; 1; 12	BRH; 2; 2	MIS; 1	MIS; 2	MAG; 1	MAG; 2	ZAN; 1; 5	ZAN; 2; 9	CAT; 1; 12	CAT; 2; 5	10th	26.5

^{*}Season still in progress.

=== Complete Asian Le Mans Series results ===
(key) (Races in bold indicate pole position) (Races in italics indicate fastest lap)

Year	Team	Class	Car	Engine	1	2	3	4	5	6	Pos.	Points
2025–26	Kessel Racing	GT	Ferrari 296 GT3	Ferrari F163 3.0 L Turbo V6	SEP; 1; 5	SEP; 2; 1	DUB; 1; 1	DUB; 2; 4	ABU; 1; 3	ABU; 2; 9	1st	94

=== Complete British GT Championship results ===
(key) (Races in bold indicate pole position) (Races in italics indicate fastest lap)

Year	Team	Car	Class	1	2	3	4	5	6	7	8	Pos.	Points
2026	2 Seas Motorsport	Mercedes-AMG GT3 Evo	GT3	SIL	OUL; 1	OUL; 2	SPA	SNE; 1	SNE; 2	DON; 2	**BRH**; 6	11th	39
