= Antonio Sainz =

Spanish rally driver (born 1957)

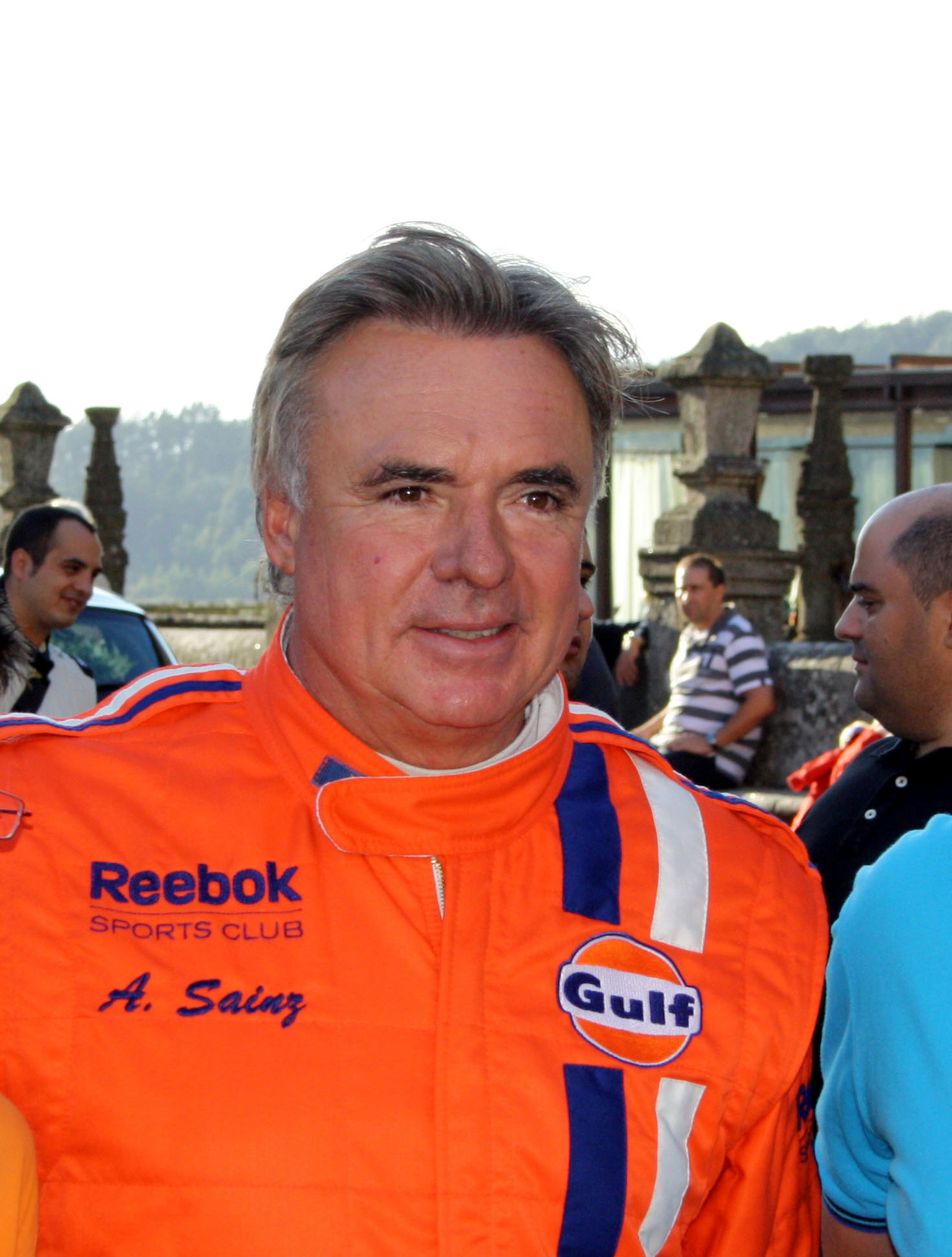
- Sainz in 2012
- Nationality: Spanish
- Born: 10 December 1957 (age 68) Madrid, Spain
- Relatives: Carlos Sainz Sr. (brother); Carlos Sainz Jr. (nephew)

Championship titles
- 2010: Spanish Historic Rally Championship
Medal record
Rallying
Representing Spain
FIA Motorsport Games
Silver medal – second place	2024 Valencia	Rally Historic Cup (Tarmac)
Bronze medal – third place	2024 Valencia	Rally Historic Cup

Antonio Sainz Cenamor (born 10 December 1957) is a Spanish rally driver. He has competed in different championships, standing out in the Spanish Historic Rally Championship, a competition that he won in 2010. In 2024, he was a silver and bronze medalist in the third edition of the FIA Motorsport Games alongside Carlos Cancela. His main co-driver is Javier Martínez Cattaneo, with whom he has been competing for years.

== Career ==
Sainz has participated in the Spanish Historic Car Championship since its inception in 2007. He was second in his first year behind Jesus Ferreiro, third in 2008, fifth in 2009 and champion in 2010, third in 2011, and runner-up in 2012. He has also participated in the European Historic Rally Championship where he finished third in the 2012 season in Category 2. In addition to the historic car championships, he also participated in the Spanish tarmac competition, generally in the Rally RACE Comunidad de Madrid, where he finished in eleventh place in 2011 and with one retirement in 2012.

In 2022, Sainz competed in the FIA Motorsport Games, in the Rally Cup, where he won the silver medal in Historic Rally Tarmac and bronze medal in Historic Rally.

== Personal life ==
Sainz is the brother of fellow rally driver Carlos Sainz Sr. and uncle of Formula 1 driver Carlos Sainz Jr.
