= Borja Rozada =

Spanish rally co-driver (born 1981)

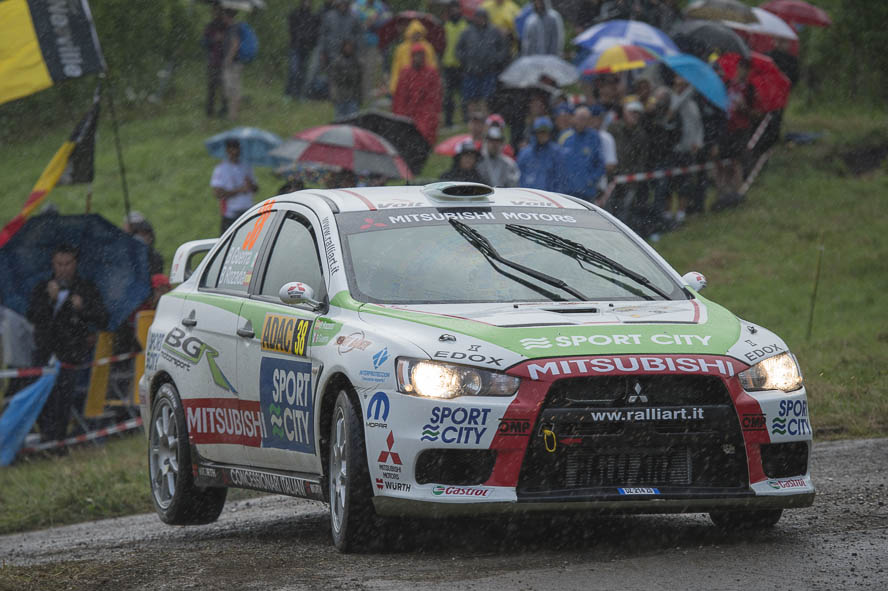

Personal information
- Nationality: (Spain) Spanish
- Born: September 16, 1981 (age 45)

World Rally Championship record
- Years active: 2007, 2009–2018, 2020–present
- Driver: Dani Sordo
- Teams: Hyundai Motorsport
- Rallies: 47
- Championships: 0
- Rally wins: 0
- Podiums: 1
- Stage wins: 8
- First rally: 2007 Rally de Portugal

Borja Rozada
Medal record
Rallying
Representing Spain
FIA Motorsport Games
Silver medal – second place	2022 France	Rally2
Silver medal – second place	2024 Spain	Rally2

Borja Rozada (born 16 September 1981) is a Spanish rally co-driver. He is partnered with Dani Sordo for Hyundai Motorsport in the World Rally Championship category.

== Rally career ==
Rozada made his WRC debut at the 2007 Rally de Portugal. His best result alongside Mexican driver Benito Guerra was the sixth place in 2014 Rally Mexico. On 28 December 2020, three-time rally winner Dani Sordo announced Rozada as his new co-driver, replacing compatriot Carlos del Barrio.

== Rally results ==
=== WRC results ===
Year	Entrant	Car	1	2	3	4	5	6	7	8	9	10	11	12	13	14	15	16	WDC	Points
2007	Manuel Rueda	Renault Clio R3	MON	SWE	NOR	MEX	POR; 26	ARG	ITA; Ret	GRE	FIN	GER; 50	NZL	ESP; 33	FRA	JPN	IRE	GBR	NC	0
2009	PCR Sport	Fiat Abarth Grande Punto S2000	IRE	NOR	CYP	POR	ARG	ITA	GRE	POL	FIN	AUS	ESP; 42	GBR					NC	0
2010	Albert Llovera	Fiat Abarth Grande Punto S2000	SWE	MEX; 22	JOR	TUR	NZL; Ret	POR; 41	BUL	FIN; Ret	GER; 35	JPN	FRA; 47	ESP; 17	GBR				NC	0
2011	Ralliart	Mitsubishi Lancer Evo X	SWE	MEX; 11	POR; 81	JOR	ITA	ARG; 15	GRE	FIN; Ret	GER			ESP; 24	GBR; Ret				27th	2
2011	Ralliart	Mitsubishi Lancer Evo IX										AUS; 9	FRA						27th	2
2012	Ralliart	Mitsubishi Lancer Evo X	MON	SWE	MEX; 11	POR	ARG; 11	GRE; 19	NZL	FIN	GER; 16	GBR	FRA	ITA; 24	ESP; 18				NC	0
2013	Benito Guerra Jr.	Citroën DS3 WRC	MON	SWE	MEX; 8	POR	ARG	GRE	ITA	FIN	GER								25th	4
2013	Benito Guerra Jr.	Mitsubishi Lancer Evo X												ESP; 14	GBR				25th	4
2013	Jose Alexander Gelvez	Mini Cooper S2000										AUS; 21	FRA						25th	4
2014	M-Sport World Rally Team	Ford Fiesta RS WRC	MON	SWE	MEX; 6	POR	ARG	ITA	POL										18th	8
2014	José Antonio Suárez	Ford Fiesta R2								FIN; Ret	GER	AUS	FRA						18th	8
2014	BAS Motorsport	Mitsubishi Lancer Evo X												ESP; 18	GBR				18th	8
2015	Benito Guerra Jr.	Ford Fiesta RS WRC	MON	SWE	MEX; 12	ARG	POR	ITA	POL	FIN	GER	AUS	FRA						NC	0
2015	Peugeot Sport España	Peugeot 208 R2												ESP; 33	GBR				NC	0
2016	Benito Guerra Jr.	Ford Fiesta RS WRC	MON	SWE	MEX; 13	ARG	POR	ITA	POL	FIN	GER	CHN; C	FRA						NC	0
2016	Ya-Car Racing	Peugeot 208 R2												ESP; Ret					NC	0
2016	Pepe López	Peugeot 208 R2													GBR; 35	AUS			NC	0
2017	Pepe López	Peugeot 208 T16	MON; Ret	SWE															NC	0
2017	Motorsport Italia	Škoda Fabia R5			MEX; 12	FRA	ARG; 12	POR; 32	ITA	POL; 17	FIN	GER; 18	ESP; 12	GBR; WD	AUS				NC	0
2018	Motorsport Italia	Škoda Fabia R5	MON	SWE	MEX; DNS	FRA	ARG	POR; 15	ITA; 20	FIN; 18	GER; 19	TUR	GBR						NC	0
2018	Sports and You	Citroën C3 R5												ESP; 31	AUS				NC	0
2020	Pepe López	Citroën C3 R5	MON; Ret	SWE	MEX	EST	TUR	ITA	MNZ										NC	0
2021	Hyundai Shell Mobis WRT	Hyundai i20 Coupe WRC	MON	ARC	CRO	POR; 2	ITA; 17	KEN; 12	EST	BEL	GRE	FIN							13th	20
2021	Pepe López	Škoda Fabia R5 Evo											ESP; Ret	MNZ					13th	20
2022	Pepe López	Hyundai i20 N Rally2	MON	SWE	CRO	POR; WD	ITA	KEN	EST	FIN	BEL	GRE	NZL	ESP; 25	JPN				NC	0
