= Vojtěch Štajf =

Czech rally driver (born 1974)

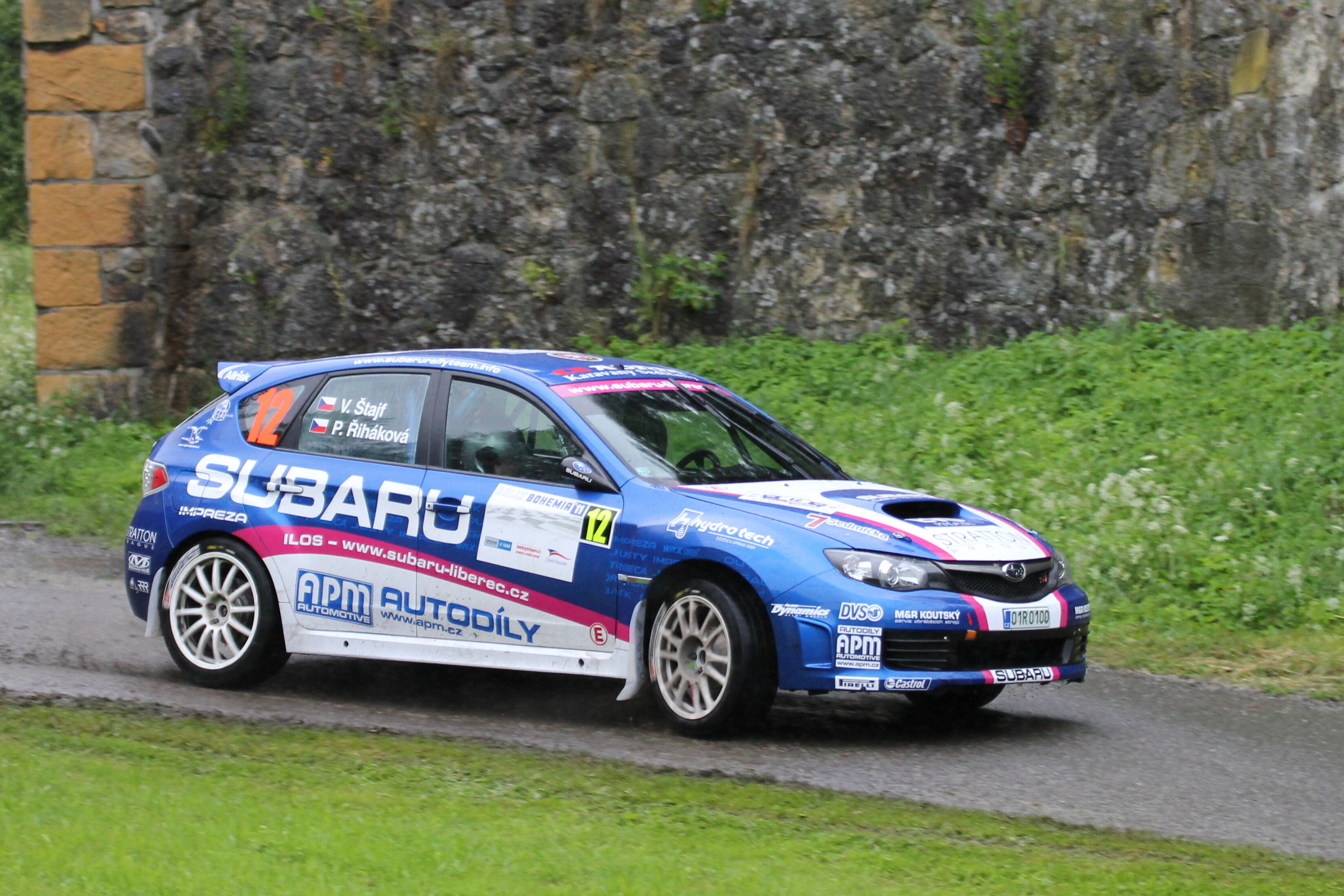
- Štajf at Rally Bohemia 2011
- Nationality: Czech
- Born: 9 March 1974 (age 52)

Championship titles
- 2021: European Historic Rally Championship - Category 2
Medal record
Rallying
Representing Czech Republic
FIA Motorsport Games
Silver medal – second place	2022 Le Castellet	Rally Historic Cup
Bronze medal – third place	2024 Valencia	Rally Historic Cup (Gravel)

Vojtěch Štajf (born 9 March 1974) is a Czech rally driver and co-owner of the Racing 21 team, which he runs with Karel Janeček. He became known to fans mainly behind the wheel of a Group N Subaru Impreza, with starts in numerous championships and finished second place overall in the Middle East Rally Championship. Štajf has also cooperated with personalities such as Daniel Landa, Petr Čtvrtníček and Slovak competitor Martin Koči.

== Career ==
Štajf was the co-driver for Aleš Loprais at the 2011 Silk Way Rally, in which they won. In the 2018 Middle East Rally Championship, Štajf won the International Rally of Qatar, finishing in second place in the championship standings. In 2021, he won the European Historic Rally Championship in Category 2.

In 2022, Štajf made his FIA Motorsport Games debut, where he competed in the inaugural Rally Cup, where he won the silver medal in the historic category. Two years later he competed in the 2024 edition of the FIA Motorsport Games Rally Cup, where he won the bronze medal in Historic Rally Gravel.

== Results ==
=== Czech Rally Championship results ===
Year	Entrant	Car	1	2	3	4	5	6	7	8	9	10	11	MMČR	Points
1999	Štajf Vojtěch	Opel Astra GSi 16V	ŠUM; 33	LIB; 29	ÚSL; 21	KRU; 38	VYŠ	BOH; Ret	BAR; 28	AGR; 19	VAL	TŘE	PŘÍ; 13	46th	0
2000	Štajf Vojtěch	Opel Astra GSi 16V	ŠUM; 19	LIB; 21	KRU; 22	BOH; 20	BAR; 21	PŘÍ; Ret						31st	0
2001	Štajf Vojtěch	Ford Escort RS Cosworth	ŠUM; 15	VAL; Ret	KRU; 9	BOH; Ret	BAR; Ret	PŘÍ	TŘE					19th	4
2002	Štajf Vojtěch	Ford Escort RS Cosworth	ŠUM; Ret	VAL; Ret	KRU; DNS	BOH; 23	BAR; Ret	PŘÍ; 10	TŘE; DSQ					25th	
2003	K.I.T. Racing	Mitsubishi Lancer Evolution VII	ŠUM; 15	VAL; Ret	KRU; 18	BOH; Ret	BAR; Ret	PŘÍ; Ret	TŘE; 11					28th	6
2004	Miva Motorsport	Mitsubishi Lancer Evolution VII	JÄN; 18	ŠUM; 3	TAT; Ret	KRU; 11	BOH; Ret	BAR; 15	PŘÍ; Ret	TŘE; Ret				12th	25
2005	Czech National Subaru Team	Subaru Impreza STi	JÄN; 16	ŠUM; 14	VAL; Ret	TAT; 23	KRU; Ret	BOH; 6	BAR; Ret	PŘÍ; Ret	TŘE; Ret			24th	12
2006	Czech National Subaru Team	Subaru Impreza STi	JÄN; 5	ŠUM; 9	TAT; 4	KRU; Ret	BOH; 5	BAR; Ret	TŘE; 4	PŘÍ; 3				2nd	89
2007	Czech National Subaru Team	Subaru Impreza STi	JÄN; 10	ŠUM; Ret	KRU; DSQ	BOH; 4	TŘE; 3	BAR; Ret	PŘÍ; 10					9th	47
2008	Czech National Subaru Team	Subaru Impreza STi	JÄN; Ret	VAL; 9	ŠUM; 4	KRU; 5	HUS; Ret	TŘE; 12	BOH; 5	BAR	PŘÍ; 6			7th	64
2009	Czech National Subaru Team	Subaru Impreza STi	VAL; 15	ŠUM; Ret	KRU; 11	HUS; 4	BAR; 12	PŘÍ; 4	BOH; 8					7th	56
2010	Czech National Subaru Team	Subaru Impreza STi	VAL; 10	ŠUM; 5	KRU; Ret	HUS; 7	BOH; Ret	BAR; 17	PŘÍ; 8					7th	45
2011	Czech National Subaru Team	Subaru Impreza STi	VAL; 11	ŠUM -	KRU; 6	HUS; Ret	BOH; 6	BAR; 26	PŘÍ; Ret					10th	41
2012	Czech National Subaru Team	Subaru Impreza STi	JÄN	VAL; 15	ŠUM; Ret	KRU; 12	HUS; 6	BOH -	BAR; 19	PŘÍ; Ret				14th	22
2013	Duck Racing	Subaru Impreza STi	JÄN	ŠUM; 5	KRU; 6	HUS; 6	BOH; 8	BAR; Ret	PŘÍ -					7th	99
2014	Duck Racing	Subaru Impreza STi	JÄN	KRU; 3	ŠUM	HUS; 5	BOH	BAR	PŘÍ					11th	70
2015	Duck Racing	Subaru Impreza STi	ŠUM	KRU	HUS	BOH	BAR; 14	KLA						-	-
2016	Racing 21	Škoda Fabia R5	ŠUM; Ret	KRU; 5	HUS; 4	BOH; 4	BAR; 7	PŘÍ; 3						3rd	140
2017	Racing 21	Škoda Fabia R5	VAL; 10	ŠUM; 8	KRU; 5	HUS; Ret	BOH; 8	BAR; Ret	PŘÍ; 3					9th	91
2018	Racing 21	Škoda Fabia R5	VAL; 11	ŠUM; Ret	KRU; 5	HUS	BOH; 4	BAR; Ret	PŘÍ; 3					8th	109
2019	Racing 21	Volkswagen Polo GTI R5	VAL; 10	ŠUM; 6	KRU; 5	HUS; 4	BOH; 5	BAR; Ret	~~PŘÍ~~					5th	128
2020	Racing 21	Volkswagen Polo GTI R5	~~KRU~~	~~HUS~~	BOH; 8	VAL	~~ZLI~~	PAČ; 7	~~KLA~~					7th	28
