= 2024 FIA Motorsport Games Drifting Cup =

Motorsport Games Cup

Race details
Date	23–27 October
Official name	FIA Motorsport Games Drifting Cup
Location	Circuit Ricardo Tormo, Spain
Course	Permanent circuit 4.005 km (2.489 mi)
- Qualifying

Pole
- Driver
- Medalists
1st place, gold medalist(s)	(Poland) Jakub Przygoński	Team Poland
2nd place, silver medalist(s)	(Norway) Simen Olsen	Team Norway
3rd place, bronze medalist(s)	(Sweden) Joakim Andersson	Team Sweden

The 2024 FIA Motorsport Games Drifting Cup was the third FIA Motorsport Games Drifting Cup, held at Circuit Ricardo Tormo, Spain on 23 October to 27 October 2024. The event was the part of the 2024 FIA Motorsport Games.

Each competitor had two solo runs, with the higher-scoring run counting towards a final qualifying classification. Top-16 drivers were eligible to contest the Final Battle stage. Drivers were seeded according to their qualifying results, with the best-scoring qualifier going up against the 16th-placed competitor, second facing 15th, etc. In qualifying, judges scored competitors using four criteria – line, angle, style and speed – up to a maximum total of 100 points. In the Final Battle phase, each judge scored the round individually with a majority decision between a three-person panel determining the winner.

== Entry list ==
Team	Car	No.	Drivers
Team Luxembourg	TBA	2	Rohan Van Riel
(Turkey) Team Türkiye	BMW E92 Eurofighter	6	Berfu Tutumlu
Team Estonia	BMW F22	11	Kevin Pesur
Team Switzerland	TBA	12	Abdul Karim Jahan
Team Ukraine	Scion FR-S	20	Dmitriy Illyuk
Team United Arab Emirates	Nissan Silvia S14	21	Hazaa Alhosani
Team Greece	BMW E36	22	Christos Chantzaras
Team Uzbekistan	BMW E36	26	Dilshod Yusupov
Team Belgium	BMW M3 E92	27	Pieter Van Hoorick
(Netherlands) Team Neatherlands	BMW M3 E46	28	Bas Mul
Team Japan	Toyota GR86	32	Koji Tada
Team Argentina	TBA	33	Rodrigo Gallo
Team Sweden	Nissan Silvia S14	41	Joakim Andersson
Team Spain	BMW M3 E46	42	Ruben Bolaños Lopez
Team Hungary	BMW M3 E92	60	Robert Petri
Team Portugal	BMW M3 E46	62	João Vieira
Team Kosovo	BMW M3 E92	74	Dijon Kajtazi
Team Latvia	BMW E92 Eurofighter	80	Kristaps Blušs
Team Poland	Toyota GR86	86	Jakub Przygoński
Team El Salvador	TBA	94	Nasser Alharbali Urias
Team Israel	BMW M3 E46	95	Itay Sadeh
Team Lebanon	TBA	99	Mohamed Chehab
(Georgia (country)) Team Georgia	BMW E36	113	Mevlud Meladze
Team Mozambique	Toyota GR86	122	Zanil Satar
(United Kingdom) Team Great Britain	BMW E36	128	Lwi Edwards
Team Brazil	TBA	202	Rafael Marinho
Team France	TBA	222	Mathias Locatelli
Team Czech Republic	BMW M2	254	Zdeněk Kadeřábek
Team Norway	Toyota GR Supra	707	Simen Olsen
Team Denmark	TBA	717	Mads Benjamin Andreasen
Team Germany	TBA	735	Jan Eric Ayrton Seeber
Team Italy	Mazda RX-7 FC	922	Luca Fuschini
Team Lithuania	BMW M4 G82	999	Andrius Vasiliauskas

== Results ==
=== Qualifying ===
Advances to the Top 16
Eliminated

=== Top 32 and Final ===
Top 32
(Sweden) Joakim Anderson	Adv
(Greece) Christos Chantzaras	Adv
(Italy) Luca Fuschini
(Estonia) Kevin Pesur	Adv
(Uzbekistan) Dilshod Yusupov
(Spain) Ruben Boalños Lopez
(United Arab Emirates) Hazaa Alhosani	Adv
(Norway) Simen Olsen	Adv
(Kosovo) Dijon Kajtazi
(Lebanon) Mohamad Chebab
(Ukraine) Dmytro Illiuk	Adv
(Netherlands) Bas Mul
(Czech Republic) Zdeněk Kadeřábek	Adv
(Hungary) Robert Petri
(Luxembourg) Rohan Van Riel	Adv
(Poland) Jakub Przygoński	Adv
(Turkey) Berfu Tutumlu
(United Kingdom) Lwi Edwards	Adv
(Israel) Itay Sadeh	Adv
(Georgia (country)) Mevlud Meladze
(Lithuania) Andrius Vasiliauskas
(Portugal) João Vieira	Adv
(Japan) Koji Tada	Adv
(Argentina) Rodrigo Gallo Crespo
(Denmark) Mads Benjamin Andreasen	Adv
(Switzerland) Abdul Karim Jahan
(Latvia) Kristaps Bluss	Adv
(Brazil) Rafael Marinho
(El Salvador) Nasser Alharbali Urias	Adv
(Belgium) Pieter Van Hoorick

Top 16
(Sweden) Joakim Andersson	Adv
(Greece) Christos Chantzara
(Estonia) Kevin Pesur	Adv
(United Arab Emirates) Hazaa Alhosani
(Norway) Simen Olsen	Adv
(Ukraine) Dmytro Illiuk
(Czech Republic) Zdeněk Kadeřábek
(Luxembourg) Rohan Van Riel	Adv
(Poland) Jakub Przygoński	Adv
(United Kingdom) Lwi Edwards
(Israel) Itay Sadeh	Adv
(Portugal) João Vieira
(Japan) Koji Tada	Adv
(Denmark) Mads Benjamin Andreasen
(Latvia) Kristaps Bluss	Adv
(El Salvador) Nasser Alharbali Urias

Top 8
(Sweden) Joakim Anderson	Adv
(Estonia) Kevin Pesur
(Norway) Simen Olsen	Adv
(Luxembourg) Rohan Van Riel
(Poland) Jakub Przygoński	Adv
(Israel) Itay Sadeh
(Japan) Koji Tada
(Latvia) Kristaps Bluss	Adv

Semi-Finals
(Sweden) Joakim Anderson
(Norway) Simen Olsen	Adv
(Poland) Jakub Przygoński	Adv
(Latvia) Kristaps Bluss

Finals
(Poland) Jakub Przygoński	1st place, gold medalist(s)
(Norway) Simen Olsen	2nd place, silver medalist(s)
Third place
(Sweden) Joakim Andersson	3rd place, bronze medalist(s)
(Latvia) Kristaps Bluss
