= 2024 FIA Motorsport Games Rally Cup =

Motorsport event

Race details
Date	24–27 October 2024
Official name	FIA Motorsport Games Rally Cup
Location	Valencian Community, Spain
- Rally2 Medalists
1st place, gold medalist(s)	(Turkey) Ali Türkkan (Turkey) Oytun Albayrak	Team Turkey
2nd place, silver medalist(s)	(Spain) Alejandro Cachón (Spain) Borja Rozada	Team Spain
3rd place, bronze medalist(s)	(Mexico) Alejandro Mauro Sánchez (Spain) Adrián Pérez Fernández	Team Mexico
- Rally2 Gravel Medalists
1st place, gold medalist(s)	(Spain) José Antonio Suárez (Spain) Alberto Iglesias Pin	Team Spain
2nd place, silver medalist(s)	(Turkey) Ali Türkkan (Turkey) Oytun Albayrak	Team Turkey
3rd place, bronze medalist(s)	(Lithuania) Rokas Steponavičius (Lithuania) Dovydas Ketvirtis	Team Lithuania
- Rally2 Tarmac Medalists
1st place, gold medalist(s)	(Spain) Alejandro Cachón (Spain) Borja Rozada	Team Spain
2nd place, silver medalist(s)	(Turkey) Ali Türkkan (Turkey) Oytun Albayrak	Team Turkey
3rd place, bronze medalist(s)	(Denmark) Kenneth Madsen (Denmark) Mette Felthaus	Team Denmark
- Rally4 Medalists
1st place, gold medalist(s)	(Germany) Tom Kässer (Germany) Stephan Schneeweiß	Team Germany
2nd place, silver medalist(s)	(Spain) Sergi Pérez (Spain) Axel Coronado	Team Spain
3rd place, bronze medalist(s)	(Brazil) Luis Eduardo Stedile (Brazil) Carlos "KZ Morales" Morales	Team Brazil
- Rally4 Gravel Medalists
1st place, gold medalist(s)	(Spain) Sergi Pérez (Spain) Axel Coronado	Team Spain
2nd place, silver medalist(s)	(Slovakia) Martin Koči (Czech Republic) Petr Těšínský	Team Slovakia
3rd place, bronze medalist(s)	(Brazil) Luis Eduardo Stedile (Brazil) Carlos "KZ Morales" Morales	Team Brazil
- Rally4 Tarmac Medalists
1st place, gold medalist(s)	(Spain) Sergi Pérez (Spain) Axel Coronado	Team Spain
2nd place, silver medalist(s)	(Netherlands) Nard Ippen (Netherlands) Jorie Christaens	Team Netherlands
3rd place, bronze medalist(s)	(Germany) René Noller (Germany) Tim Rauber	Team Germany
- Rally Historic Medalists
1st place, gold medalist(s)	(Italy) Andrea "Zippo" Zivian (Italy) Nicola Arena	Team Italy
2nd place, silver medalist(s)	(United Kingdom) Benjamin Mellors (United Kingdom) Alex Lee	Team United Kingdom
3rd place, bronze medalist(s)	(Spain) Antonio Sainz (Spain) Carlos Cancela	Team Spain
- Rally Historic Gravel Medalists
1st place, gold medalist(s)	(Italy) Andrea "Zippo" Zivian (Italy) Nicola Arena	Team Italy
2nd place, silver medalist(s)	(United Kingdom) Ernie Graham (United Kingdom) Anna Graham	Team United Kingdom
3rd place, bronze medalist(s)	(Czech Republic) Vojtěch Štajf (Czech Republic) Veronika Havelková	Team Czech Republic
- Rally Historic Tarmac Medalists
1st place, gold medalist(s)	(Italy) Andrea "Zippo" Zivian (Italy) Nicola Arena	Team Italy
2nd place, silver medalist(s)	(Spain) Antonio Sainz (Spain) Carlos Cancela	Team Spain
3rd place, bronze medalist(s)	(Sweden) Christer Hedlund (Sweden) Ida Lidebjer-Granberg	Team Sweden

The 2024 FIA Motorsport Games Rally Cup was the second FIA Motorsport Games Rally Cup, held across gravel and tarmac stages around the Circuit Ricardo Tormo in Spain on 24 October to 27 October 2024. The events were part of the 2024 FIA Motorsport Games.

== Entries ==
The following countries and crews are officially entered into the 2024 FIA Motorsport Games Rally Cup:

- Crews with a green background are eligible for the overall win.

Entrant	Car	No.	Driver	Co-driver	Gravel/Tarmac
Rally2
Team Turkey	Ford Fiesta Rally2	1	(Turkey) Ali Türkkan	(Turkey) Oytun Albayrak	Gravel/Tarmac
Team Spain	Toyota GR Yaris Rally2	2	(Spain) Alejandro Cachón	(Spain) Borja Rozada	Tarmac
Team United Kingdom	Proton Iriz R5	3	(United Kingdom) Oliver Mellors	(United Kingdom) Ian Windress	
Team Germany	Ford Fiesta Rally2	4	(Germany) Björn Satorius	(Germany) Hanna Ostlender	
Team Mexico	Škoda Fabia RS Rally2	5	(Mexico) Alejandro Mauro Sánchez	(Spain) Adrián Pérez Fernández	
Team Sweden	Škoda Fabia Rally2 evo	6	(Sweden) Jari Liiten	(Sweden) Mikael Johansson	Gravel
Team Lithuania	Škoda Fabia R5	7	(Lithuania) Rokas Steponavičius	(Lithuania) Dovydas Ketvirtis	Gravel
Team Spain	Škoda Fabia RS Rally2	8	(Spain) José Antonio Suárez	(Spain) Alberto Iglesias Pin	Gravel
Team Ecuador	Škoda Fabia RS Rally2	9	(Ecuador) Juan Guerrero	(Ecuador) Andrés Carpio	Gravel
Team Qatar	Škoda Fabia RS Rally2	10	(Qatar) Abdulaziz Al-Kuwari	(Qatar) Nasser Al-Kuwari	Gravel
(Georgia (country)) Team Georgia	Škoda Fabia RS Rally2	11	(Georgia (country)) Sandro Tavartkiladze	(Georgia (country)) Davit Arjevanidze	Tarmac
Team Denmark	Citroën C3 Rally2	12	(Denmark) Kenneth Madsen	(Denmark) Mette Felthaus	Tarmac
Team Luxembourg	Hyundai i20 N Rally2	15	(Luxembourg) Steve Fernandes	(Luxembourg) Steve Kirfel	Tarmac
Rally4
Team Turkey	Peugeot 208 Rally4	16	(Turkey) Kerem Kazaz	(France) Corentin Silvestre	Gravel/Tarmac
Team India	Peugeot 208 Rally4	17	(India) Pragathi Gowda	(Brazil) Gabriel Morales	Gravel/Tarmac
Team Spain	Peugeot 208 Rally4	18	(Spain) Sergi Pérez	(Spain) Axel Coronado	Gravel/Tarmac
Team Slovakia	Peugeot 208 Rally4	19	(Slovakia) Martin Koči	(Czech Republic) Petr Těšínský	Gravel/Tarmac
Team Brazil	Peugeot 208 Rally4	20	(Brazil) Luis Eduardo Stedile	(Brazil) Carlos "KZ Morales" Morales	Gravel
Team Germany	Peugeot 208 Rally4	21	(Germany) Tom Kässer	(Germany) Stephan Schneeweiß	
Team Chinese Taipei	Peugeot 208 Rally4	22	(Chinese Taipei) Hsuan Lee	(Chinese Taipei) Tsung-yu Hsieh	
Team Lithuania	Peugeot 208 Rally4	23	(Lithuania) Audronis Gulbinas	(Lithuania) Vytis Pauliukonis	Gravel
Team Argentina	Peugeot 208 Rally4	24	(Argentina) Luciano Bonomi	(Argentina) Miguel Recalt	Gravel
Team Portugal	Peugeot 208 Rally4	25	(Portugal) Hugo Lopes	(Portugal) Valter Cardoso	Gravel
Team Sweden	Ford Fiesta Rally4	26	(Sweden) Heidi Ryrlén	(Sweden) Marcus Bengtsson	Tarmac
(Georgia (country)) Team Georgia	Peugeot 208 Rally4	27	(Georgia (country)) Shalva Tsikhelashvili	(Georgia (country)) Irakli Chkheidze	Tarmac
Team Germany	Opel Corsa Rally4	28	(Germany) René Noller	(Germany) Tim Rauber	Tarmac
Team Greece	Peugeot 208 Rally4	29	(Greece) Christos Avgeropoulos	(Greece) Stratos Giavassis	Tarmac
Team Netherlands	Opel Corsa Rally4	30	(Netherlands) Nard Ippen	(Netherlands) Jorie Christaens	Tarmac
Team Portugal	Peugeot 208 Rally4	31	(Portugal) Rafael Cardeira	(Portugal) Luís Boiça	Tarmac
Team Luxembourg	Peugeot 208 Rally4	32	(Luxembourg) Hugo Arellano	(Belgium) Thomas Walbrecq	Tarmac
Rally Historic
Team Sweden	Alpine-Renault A310 V6	33	(Sweden) Kjell Fransson	(Sweden) Peter Fransson	
Team United Kingdom	Ford Escort RS 1800 MKII	34	(United Kingdom) Ernie Graham	(United Kingdom) Anna Graham	Gravel
Team Sweden	Ford Escort RS 1800 MKII	35	(Sweden) Christer Hedlund	(Sweden) Ida Lidebjer-Granberg	Tarmac
Team Germany	Volvo 240	36	(Germany) Siegfried Mayr	(Germany) Renate Mayr	
Team United Kingdom	Toyota Celica 2000 GT (RA40)	37	(United Kingdom) Benjamin Mellors	(United Kingdom) Alex Lee	
Team United Kingdom	Ford Escort RS 1800 MKII	38	(United Kingdom) James Potter	(United Kingdom) Tim Sayer	Tarmac
Team Spain	Porsche 911 Carrera RSR 3.0	39	(Spain) Antonio Sainz	(Spain) Carlos Cancela	Gravel/Tarmac
Team Sweden	Volvo PV 544 Sport	40	(Sweden) Kim Sevius	(Sweden) Alexander Alin	Gravel
Team Czech Republic	Opel Ascona A	41	(Czech Republic) Vojtěch Štajf	(Czech Republic) Veronika Havelková	Gravel/Tarmac
Team Italy	Audi Quattro	43	(Italy) Andrea "Zippo" Zivian	(Italy) Nicola Arena	Gravel/Tarmac

== Itinerary ==
All dates and times are CEST (UTC+2).

Date	Time	No.	Stage name	Distance	note
Date	Start	No.	Stage name	Distance	note
24 October	14:00	—	—	—	Free Practice
24 October	17:00	QS	Circuit Ricardo Tormo	4.12 km	Qualifying
25 October	9:02	SS1	Utiel - Calderon - 1	14.30 km	
25 October	9:40	SS2	Utiel San Antonio 1	14.80 km	
25 October	11:35	SS3	Utiel - Calderon 2	14.30 km	
25 October	14:33	SS4	Utiel San Antonio 2	14.80 km	
25 October	15:16	SS5	Utiel - Calderon 3	14.30 km	
25 October	16:57	SS6	Utiel San Antonio 3	14.80 km	
25 October	18:30	SS7	Circuit Ricardo Tormo 1	4.12 km	
26 October	9:48	SS8	Cortes 1	12.90 km	
26 October	10:42	SS9	La Garrofera 1	14.60 km	
26 October	11:35	SS10	Gestalgar 1	14.90 km	
26 October	14:33	SS11	Cortes 2	12.90 km	
26 October	15:26	SS12	La Garrofera 2	14.60 km	
26 October	16:20	SS13	Gestalgar 2	14.90 km	
26 October	18:10	SS14	Circuit Ricardo Tormo 2	4.12 km	
27 October	17:05	SS15	Circuit Ricardo Tormo	12.08 km	Medals Stage

Stages on the 25th of October counted for the Gravel Cup and stages on the 26th of October counted for the Tarmac Cup.

== Results ==
=== Gravel Cup ===
==== Rally2 ====
Pos	No.	Driver	Co-driver	Team	Car	Time	Gap
1st place, gold medalist(s)	8	(Spain) José Antonio Suárez	(Spain) Alberto Iglesias Pin	Team Spain	Škoda Fabia RS Rally2	1:00:50.9	–
2nd place, silver medalist(s)	1	(Turkey) Ali Türkkan	(Turkey) Oytun Albayrak	Team Turkey	Ford Fiesta Rally2	1:01.53.9	+1:03.0
3rd place, bronze medalist(s)	7	(Lithuania) Rokas Steponavičius	(Lithuania) Dovydas Ketvirtis	Team Lithuania	Škoda Fabia R5	1:02:12.4	+1:21.5
4	10	(Qatar) Abdulaziz Al-Kuwari	(Qatar) Nasser Al-Kuwari	Team Qatar	Škoda Fabia RS Rally2	1:05.27.8	+4:36.9
Ret	6	(Sweden) Jari Liiten	(Sweden) Mikael Johansson	Team Sweden	Škoda Fabia Rally2 evo	Accident	
Ret	9	(Ecuador) Juan Guerrero	(Ecuador) Andrés Carpio	Team Ecuador	Škoda Fabia RS Rally2	Mechanical	

==== Rally4 ====
Pos	No.	Driver	Co-driver	Team	Car	Time	Gap
1st place, gold medalist(s)	18	(Spain) Sergi Pérez	(Spain) Axel Coronado	Team Spain	Peugeot 208 Rally4	1:05:17.3	–
2nd place, silver medalist(s)	19	(Slovakia) Martin Koči	(Czech Republic) Petr Těšínský	Team Slovakia	Peugeot 208 Rally4	1:05:38.4	+21.1
3rd place, bronze medalist(s)	20	(Brazil) Luis Eduardo Stedile	(Brazil) Carlos "KZ Morales" Morales	Team Brazil	Peugeot 208 Rally4	1:08:37.5	+3:20.2
4	17	(India) Pragathi Gowda	(Brazil) Gabriel Morales	Team India	Peugeot 208 Rally4	1:22:13.5	+16:56.2
Ret	16	(Turkey) Kerem Kazaz	(France) Corentin Silvestre	Team Turkey	Peugeot 208 Rally4	Driveshaft	
Ret	23	(Lithuania) Audronis Gulbinas	(Lithuania) Vytis Pauliukonis	Team Lithuania	Peugeot 208 Rally4	Accident	
Ret	24	(Argentina) Luciano Bonomi	(Argentina) Miguel Recalt	Team Argentina	Peugeot 208 Rally4	Accident	
Ret	25	(Portugal) Hugo Lopes	(Portugal) Valter Cardoso	Team Portugal	Peugeot 208 Rally4	Accident	

==== Rally Historic ====
Pos	No.	Driver	Co-driver	Team	Car	Time	Gap
1st place, gold medalist(s)	43	(Italy) Andrea "Zippo" Zivian	(Italy) Nicola Arena	Team Italy	Audi Quattro	1:13:44.3	–
2nd place, silver medalist(s)	34	(United Kingdom) Ernie Graham	(United Kingdom) Anna Graham	Team United Kingdom	Ford Escort RS 1800 MKII	1:13.46.4	+2.1
3rd place, bronze medalist(s)	41	(Czech Republic) Vojtěch Štajf	(Czech Republic) Veronika Havelková	Team Czech Republic	Opel Ascona A	1:18:18.6	+4:34.3
4	39	(Spain) Antonio Sainz	(Spain) Carlos Cancela	Team Spain	Porsche 911 Carrera RSR 3.0	1:21:58.5	+8:14.2
Ret	40	(Sweden) Kim Sevius	(Sweden) Alexander Alin	Team Sweden	Volvo PV 544 Sport	Mechanical	
