= Carlos Sainz Sr. =

Spanish rally driver (born 1962)

Carlos Sainz
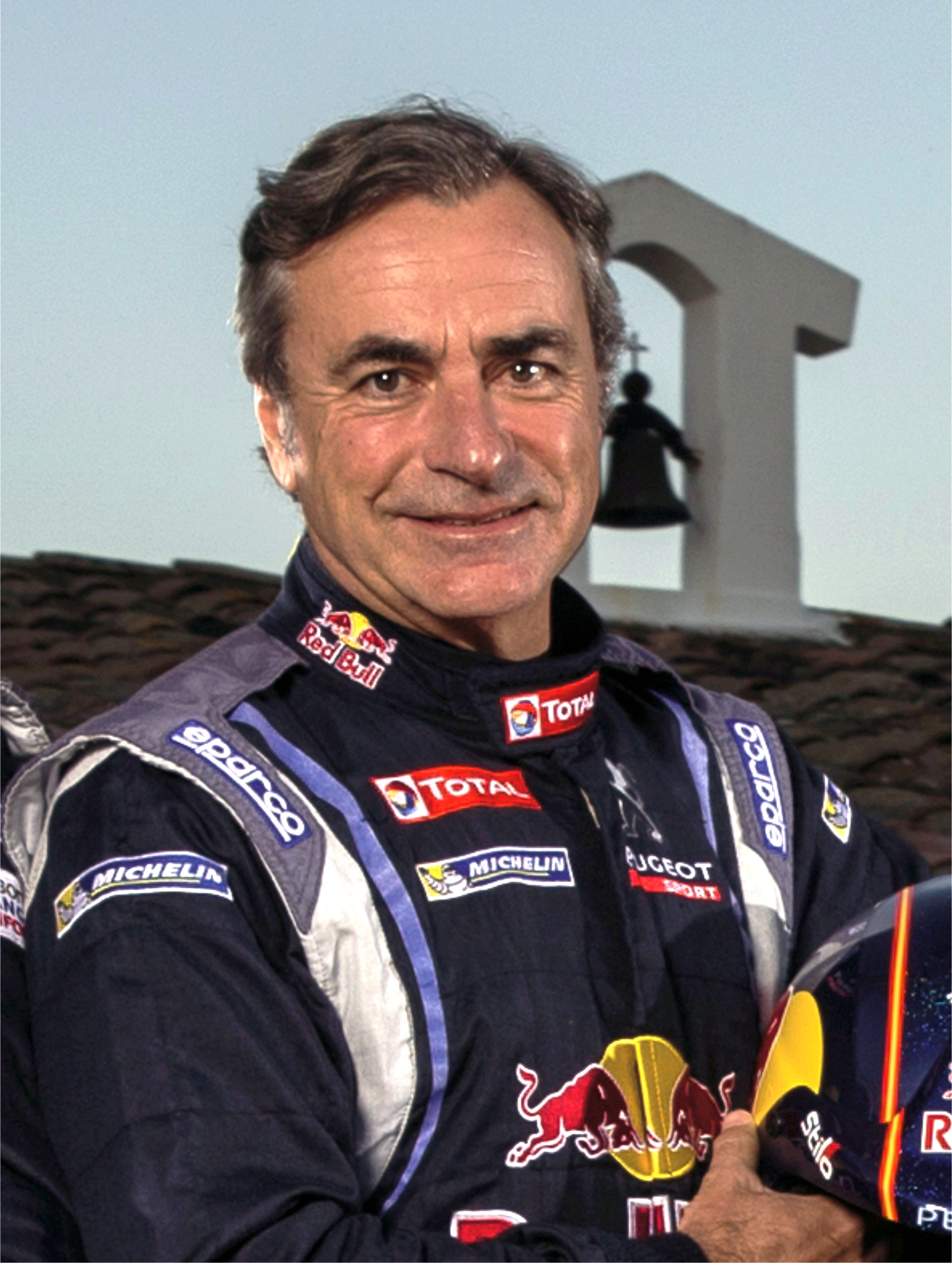
- Sainz in 2014
- Born: Carlos Sainz Cenamor; 12 April 1962 (age 64); Madrid, Spain
- Children: 3, including Carlos
- Relatives: Antonio Sainz (brother)

World Rally Championship record
- Years active: 1987–2005
- Co-driver: (Spain) Antonio Boto (Spain) Luis Moya (Spain) Marc Marti (Brazil) Matías Valentin
- Teams: Ford, Toyota, Lancia, Subaru, Citroën
- Rallies: 196
- Championships: 2 (1990, 1992)
- Rally wins: 26
- Podiums: 97
- Stage wins: 757
- Total points: 1,242
- First rally: 1987 Rally Portugal
- First win: 1990 Acropolis Rally
- Last win: 2004 Rally Argentina
- Last rally: 2005 Acropolis Rally

Carlos Sainz Cenamor (born 12 April 1962) is a Spanish rally driver. He won the World Rally Championship drivers' title with Toyota in 1990 and 1992, and finished runner-up four times. Constructors' world champions to have benefited from Sainz are Subaru (1995), Toyota (1999) and Citroën (2003, 2004 and 2005). In the 2018 season, he was one of the official drivers of the Team Peugeot Total. He received the Princess of Asturias Sports Award in 2020. Sainz founded the Acciona | Sainz XE Team to join Extreme E and competed in the first two seasons alongside Laia Sanz.

Nicknamed El Matador, Sainz previously held the WRC record for most career starts until Finnish co-driver Miikka Anttila broke the record. He was also the first non-Nordic driver to win the 1000 Lakes Rally in Finland. He came close to repeating the feat at the Swedish Rally, finishing second four times and third twice. Alongside his WRC successes, he has won the Dakar Rally (2008, 2010, 2018, 2020, 2024), the Race of Champions (1997) and the Asia-Pacific Rally Championship (1990). His co-drivers were Antonio Boto, Luis Moya, Marc Martí, and Lucas Cruz.

== Early life ==
Sainz was born in Madrid. Before moving into motorsport, he played football and squash. At the age of 11, he got his first driving experience in his sister Carmen's newly bought SEAT 600. As a teenager, Real Madrid gave him a trial and in squash he was the Spanish champion at the age of 16. While on a road trip organized with some friends to the Alps, Sainz demonstrated his early driving skills in his friend's and later to be first co-pilot Juanjo Lacalle's SEAT 131 on the snow-capped mountain roads, that the latter impressed promised him he would be the co-pilot in his first race.

Sainz got his first touch of motorsport in Formula Ford while still playing squash and football. Before dedicating himself to motorsport, Sainz studied law up to the second scheduled cycle.

== Rallying career ==
=== Early career (1980–1988) ===
Sainz began rallying in 1980. In 1981 he won his first Rally Championship in the inaugural season of the 'Copa Panda' one-make rally series launched by SEAT and addressed to young drivers aiming to come close to the motorsport experience. After being invited to compete against other pilots also winners of competitions with the Spanish brand, he became in 1982 SEAT's official pilot behind the wheel of a Group 2 SEAT Panda rally car participating in Spanish Championship Rallies.

Sainz finished runner-up in the Spanish Rally Championship in 1986, in a Group B Renault 5 Turbo, and won it with a Ford Sierra RS Cosworth in 1987 and 1988.

Ford gave Sainz his first World Rally championship appearances during the 1987 season. He finished seventh in the Tour de Corse and eighth on the RAC Rally. He remained with Ford for the following season, now co-driven by Luis Moya, who remained his regular co-driver for the next fifteen years. He finished fifth twice, in the Tour de Corse and the Rallye Sanremo, and seventh on an icy RAC Rally.

Ford were an increasingly minor player in the World Rally Championship, with the rear-wheel-drive Sierra uncompetitive against the four-wheel-drive cars, and struggled to retain ambitious and talented young drivers such as Sainz and his teammate in 1988, Didier Auriol. Both departed the team for 1989; Auriol to Lancia and Sainz to Toyota Team Europe, the Japanese marque's rallying arm operating in Cologne, Germany.

=== Toyota (1989–1992) ===
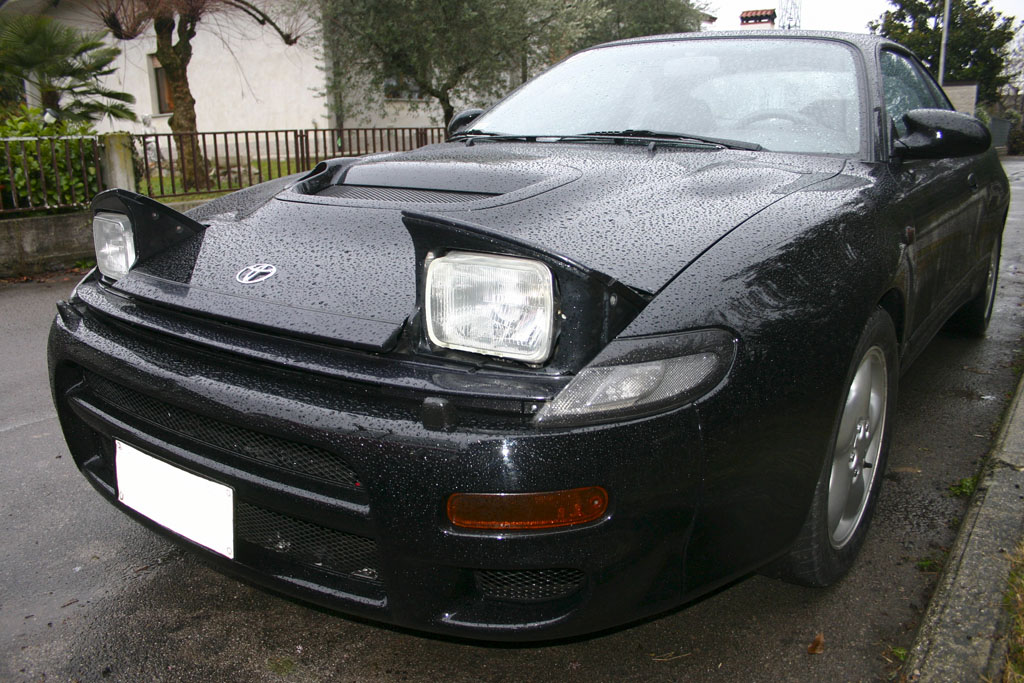
1992 Toyota Celica GT-Four Carlos Sainz Limited Edition

Despite all previous rallying Toyota Celicas having only ever looked a competitive prospect on highly specialized endurance rallies such as the Safari Rally, the new combination of Toyota and Sainz rapidly rose in competitiveness. In the 1989 season, Sainz started with four retirements but then finished on the podium in three rallies in a row. His teammate, by then two-time world champion Juha Kankkunen, also gave the Celica GT-Four ST165 its debut win at the inaugural Rally Australia. Sainz would almost certainly have won his first World Championship Rally on the final event of the season, the RAC Rally, but for mechanical failure in the final stages, which relegated him to second.

In the 1990 season, Sainz drove his GT-Four to victory at the Acropolis Rally, at the Rally New Zealand, at the 1000 Lakes Rally, as the first non-Nordic driver, and at the RAC Rally, claiming his first world drivers' title, ahead of Lancia's Didier Auriol and Kankkunen, ending the Italian marque's domination of the drivers' world championship since the advent of the Group A era of the sport in 1987.

In 1991, Sainz narrowly failed to defend his title against a resurgent Lancia-mounted Kankkunen, his efforts capped by a dramatic roll of his Celica in Australia which left him in a neckbrace. Both Sainz and Kankkunen took five wins, the first time in the history of the WRC that two drivers had managed such a win tally during one season. Sainz led Kankkunen by one point going into the final round of the season, the RAC Rally, where Kankkunen took his third title by winning ahead of Kenneth Eriksson and Sainz. Kankkunen's and Sainz's point totals, 150 and 143, both broke the record set by Sainz a year earlier (140).

Aboard the new ST185 Toyota Celica in the 1992 season, in a year that would prove the last for the foreseeable future for Lancia, Sainz managed to score memorable victories on the Safari Rally and on his home asphalt round, the Rally Catalunya. The title fight again went down to the wire, and this time in a three-way battle; before the RAC, Sainz led Kankkunen by two points and Auriol, who had taken a record six wins during the season, by three points. Sainz's victory ahead of Ari Vatanen and Kankkunen, combined with Auriol's retirement, confirmed the title in favour of the Spaniard.

A limited number of 440 Celica GT-Four ST185s, carrying Sainz's name on a plaque in the vehicle, and with decals on the outside, were sold in the United Kingdom in 1992 in an attempt to capitalise on Sainz's two championship successes with the works team. These were the part of the 5,000 units of ST185 for WRC homologation. It is said that Sainz still keeps a Celica GT-Four given to him by Toyota, which he drives to Real Madrid games at the Santiago Bernabéu Stadium.

=== Lancia (1993) ===
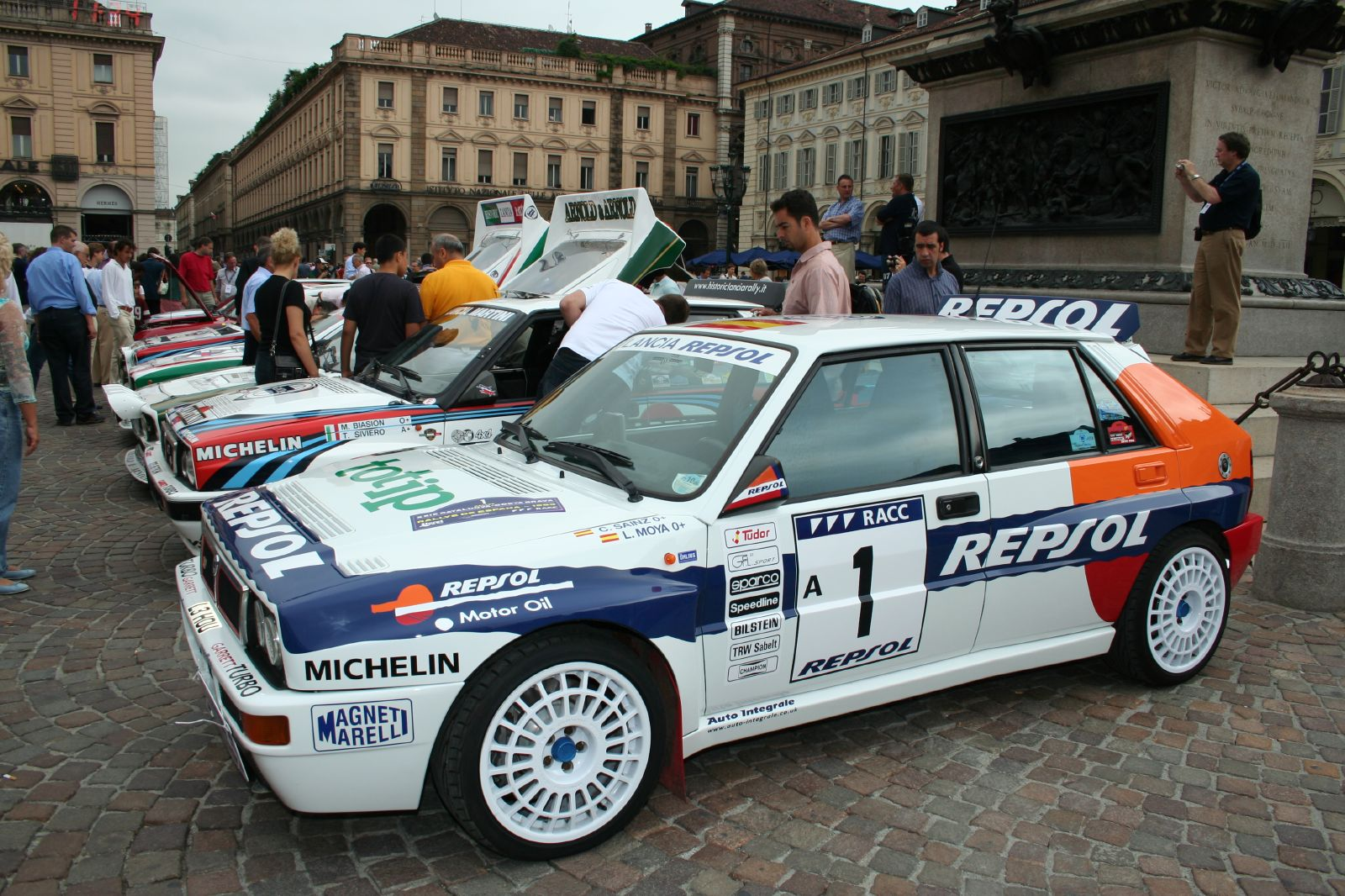
A Replica of an ex-Sainz Lancia Delta HF Integrale during Lancia centenary celebrations in Turin

Despite winning the world title, Sainz left Toyota at the end of 1992, mainly because for the 1993 season the team was to be sponsored by Castrol, a rival to Sainz's personal sponsor, Repsol. Sainz therefore moved to the private but Lancia-backed Jolly Club. Lancia had won the manufacturers' championship for the previous six years, but the Delta was an ageing design and technical developments during the season were minor, despite assurances given to Sainz that development would continue. The Delta lost ground to newer cars, and became less and less competitive as 1993 wore on. Sainz's only podium finish was his second place at the Acropolis Rally. He finished second on the San Remo Rally, but he and his teammate were later disqualified for using illegal fuel. He finished eighth in the drivers' championship, which was won by Toyota driver Juha Kankkunen. Lancia withdrew from the sport altogether at the end of the season.

=== Subaru (1994–1995) ===
Sainz then chose to drive for the then fledgling Subaru World Rally Team in 1994, where he replaced Ari Vatanen. Sainz's experience, perfectionism and abilities as a development driver played a vital role in developing the then-new Impreza to the point where it could mount a sustained challenge to Toyota and Ford. Indeed, in the hands of Sainz and Colin McRae the Subarus were frequently faster than the Fords during the season. Toyota won the manufacturers' title, but the drivers' championship was only settled on the final round, with Didier Auriol winning ahead of Sainz. In the 1995 season, he won the Monte Carlo Rally, the Rally Portugal and the Rally Catalunya. At this latter event, he was trailing his teammate Colin McRae until the team ordered the Scotsman to slow down and allow Sainz to win, which led to a dispute between the drivers. Nevertheless, they were tied for the lead in the drivers' world championship going into the season-ending RAC Rally. McRae won his home event 36 seconds ahead of Sainz, despite losing time with mechanical difficulties that at one stage had put him two minutes behind. Subaru secured their first manufacturers' title with a triple win as the team's second young Briton, Richard Burns, finished third. Sainz was later to join McRae at both Ford and Citroën.

=== Return to Ford (1996–1997) ===
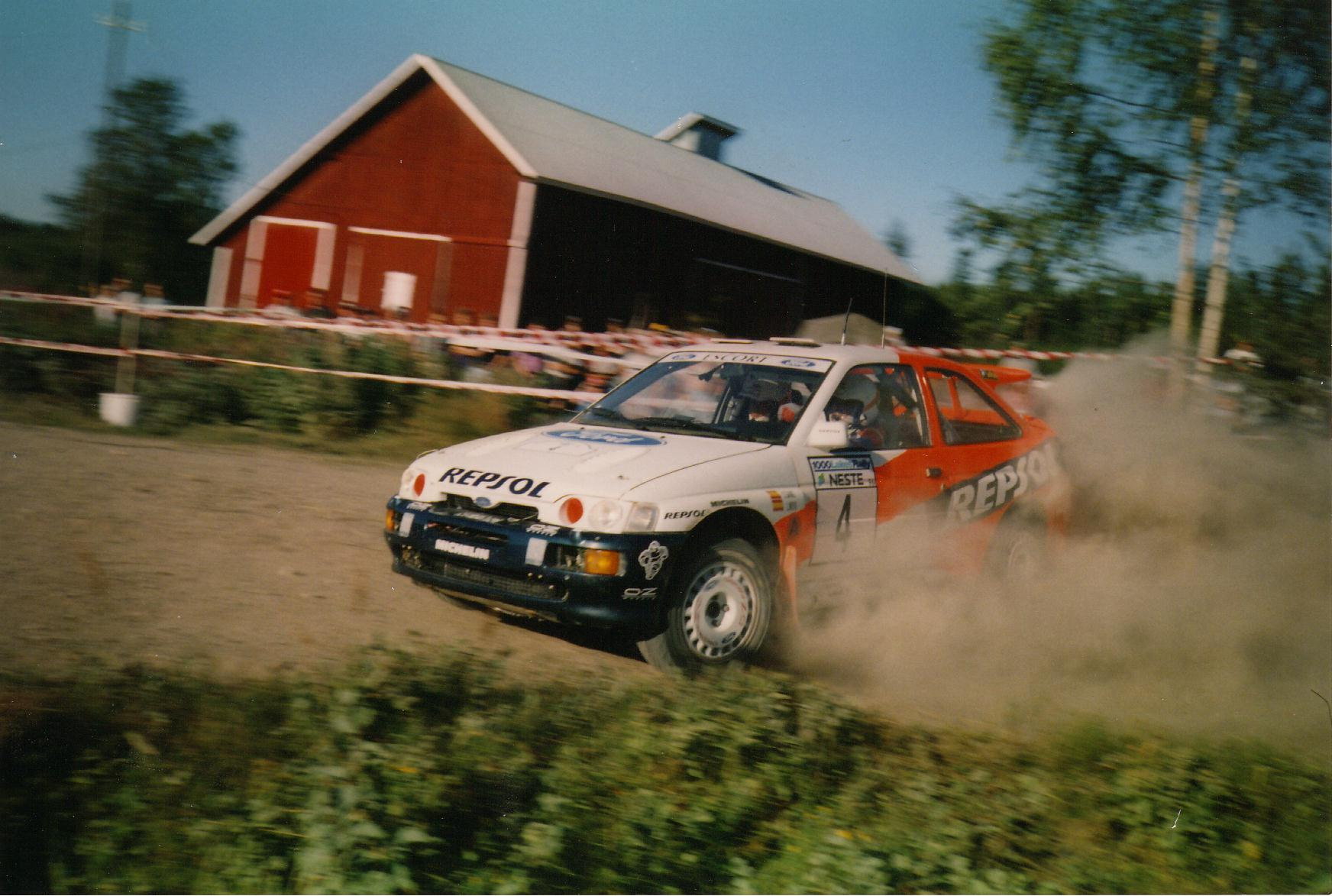
Sainz driving an Escort RS Cosworth at the 1996 1000 Lakes

Sainz was supposed to return to Toyota for 1996 season, however the Toyota Team Europe was banned for the season following the cheating scandal surrounding the Celica's turbo restrictor. Instead Sainz decided to join the factory Ford, bringing the Repsol sponsorship with him. He spent two seasons with the squad, aboard the Ford Escort RS Cosworth and later, the Escort World Rally Car. In 1996, he won the inaugural Rally Indonesia and with five other podium finishes to his name, he took third place in the drivers' world championship, behind Mitsubishi's Tommi Mäkinen and Subaru's McRae. In the 1997 season, he again won the Indonesian round, along with the Acropolis Rally, but again lost the title fight to Mäkinen and McRae. However, he won the Race of Champions at the end of 1997.

=== Return to Toyota (1998–1999) ===
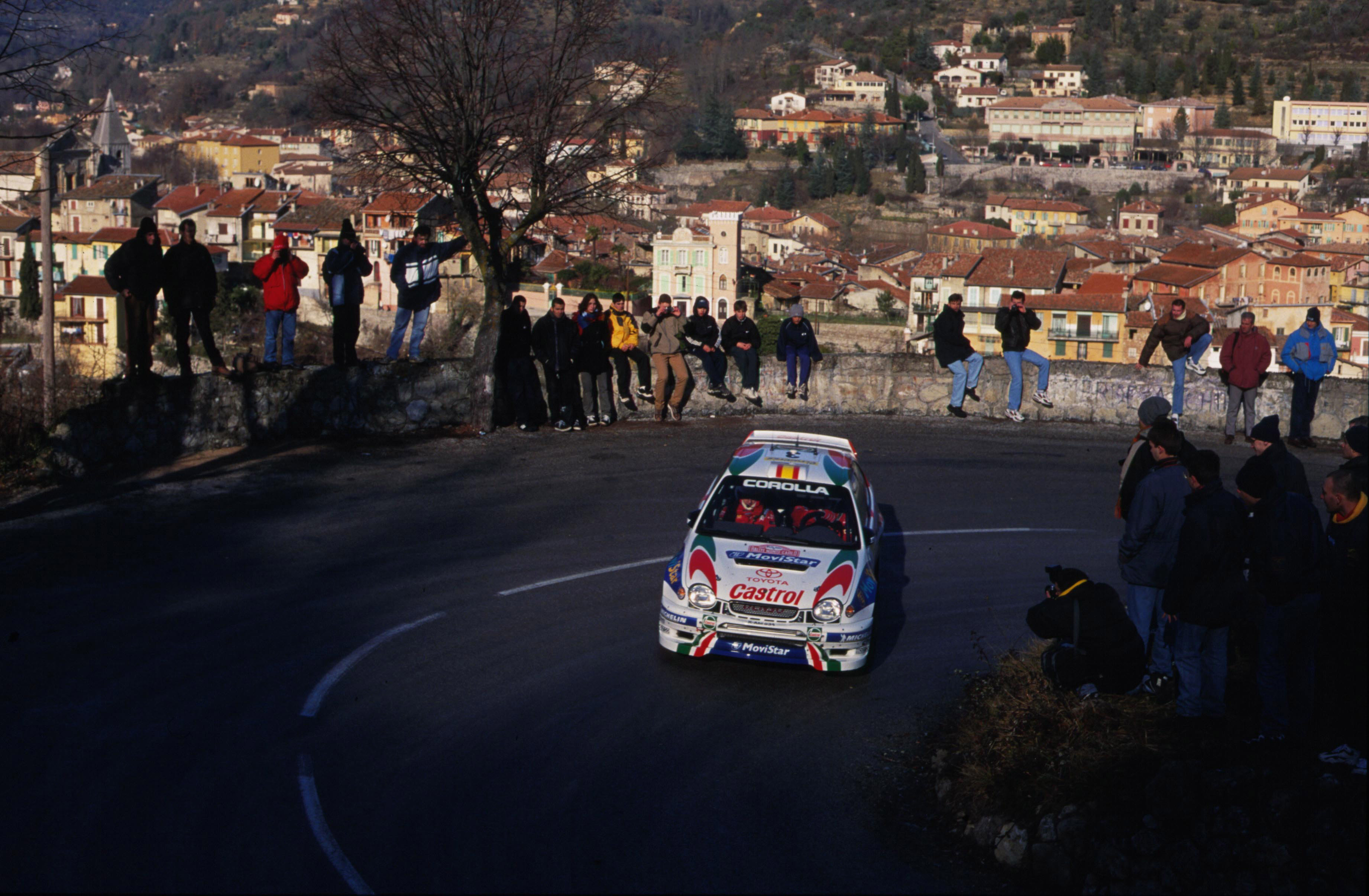
Sainz with a Toyota Corolla WRC at the 1999 Monte Carlo Rally

Sainz then departed, once again, for Toyota, partnering Didier Auriol and helping to further the Corolla World Rally Car project that had been instituted in 1997, as part of the Cologne based team's recovery from the embarrassment of exclusion from the world championship on the penultimate round of the 1995 season.

Sainz won on his first outing for them, on the 1998 season opener Monte Carlo Rally, and later in the season, added a victory in New Zealand. The seemingly terminal blow to title rival Tommi Mäkinen's chances was his retirement on the first day of the final event of the year, the Rally Great Britain, which gave the initiative to Sainz, who now only had to finish fourth in order to ensure the title. However, just 300 metres (980 ft) from the finish of the last stage, he too was forced to retire from the needed fourth place with a mechanical problem. As a result, both Sainz and Toyota gifted their respective titles to rivals Mäkinen and Mitsubishi Ralliart.

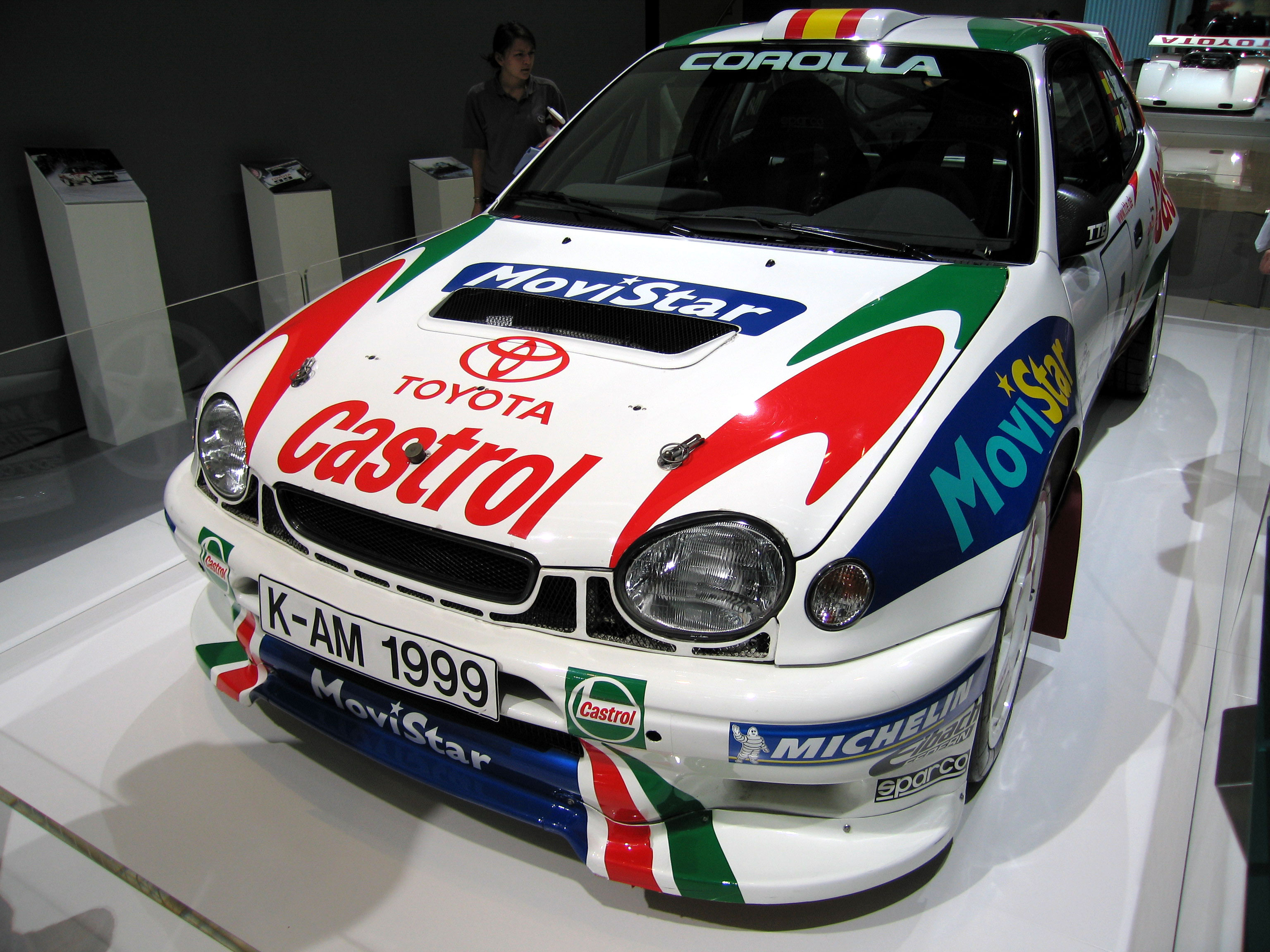
An ex-Sainz Corolla WRC at the 2007 Frankfurt Motor Show

A subdued season followed for Sainz in 1999, although it did at least culminate in a departing manufacturers' title for Toyota, by now fostering alternative interests in Formula One. Sainz took a total of eight podiums, but no wins, and finished fifth in the drivers' standings, behind his third-placed teammate Auriol who had taken his only win of the season at the inaugural China Rally.

=== Second return to Ford (2000–2002) ===
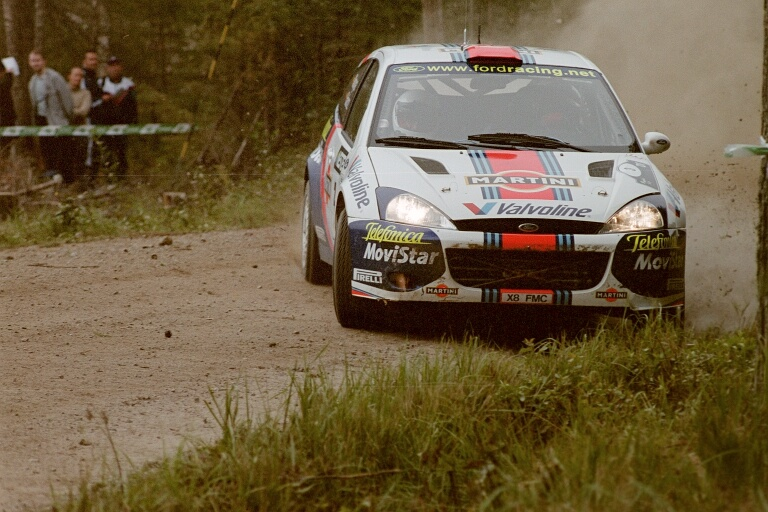
Sainz driving his Ford Focus WRC at the 2001 Rally Finland

This was the precursor of another, three-year stint with Ford, again alongside McRae, beginning with the 2000 season. Sainz won the inaugural edition of the Cyprus round of the world championship, and finished third in the drivers' points standings.

Sainz failed to score a victory on any rally during the 2001 season, but with five podiums and four other point-scoring finishes, he managed to keep himself in the title fight throughout the very closely contested season, eventually finishing sixth in the standings, only eleven points adrift of the champion, Subaru's Richard Burns. Meanwhile, teammate McRae took three wins and led the championship before the season-ending Rally GB, where McRae crashed out. Ford also lost the manufacturer's title to Peugeot.

In 2002, Sainz inherited the victory of the Rally Argentina, having provisionally finished third, due to the disqualifications of the two leading Peugeots of Marcus Grönholm and Burns. This was his only win of the season, and in a close fight for second place in the drivers' championship, behind the dominant Grönholm, Sainz finished third, one point ahead of his teammate McRae.

=== Citroën (2003–2005) ===
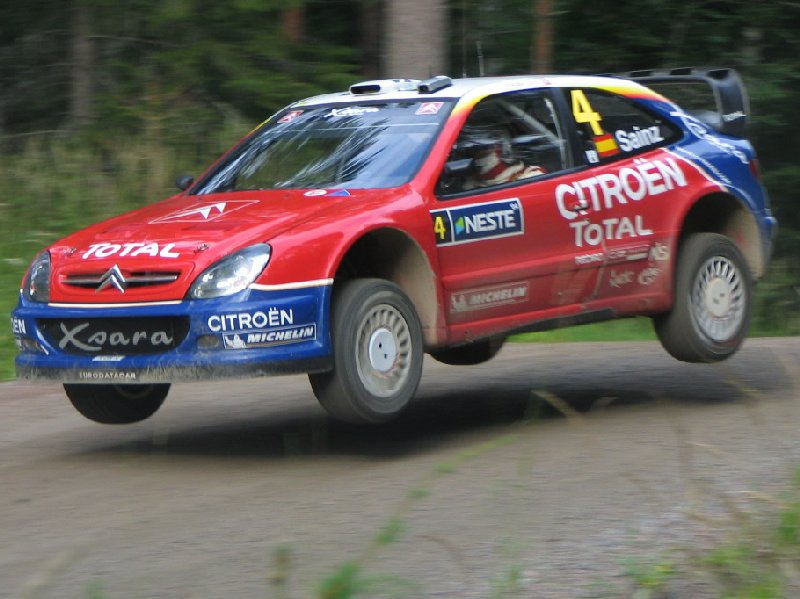
Sainz with a Citroën Xsara WRC at the 2004 Rally Finland

Effectively frozen out along with McRae at Ford, Sainz along with the Scot moved to Citroën for the 2003, during which he scored one win in Turkey – which was the first gravel event win for Citroën Xsara WRC – and finished third in the championship. Sainz continued with the team in the 2004 season, and scored his final world rally victory at the 2004 Rally Argentina. During the Rally Catalonia 2004, after announcing his retirement, Sainz was considered by drivers, codrivers and directors of the official teams, as the best rally driver of history. In the championship, Sainz finished fourth, after missing out the final rally in Australia, due an accident during pre-event recce.

Despite formally retiring at the end of the 2004 season, with a possible view to moving into the World Touring Car Championship, Sainz was invited back to the WRC fold on the request of Citroën, to replace the faltering Belgian driver François Duval. Although Duval was soon to reclaim his seat, Sainz's two rallies back in the Citroën impressed many, with the now 43-year-old Spaniard posting fourth and third finishing positions respectively.

=== Later career in rally raid ===
In 2006, Sainz was at the wheel of a Volkswagen in that year's Dakar Rally, sharing the cockpit with the two times winner of the Dakar Rally, Andreas Schulz. In 2007, he repeated his attempt with Volkswagen, this time with French Michel Perin, also a former winner of the raid. Following the resignation of Fernando Martin, he even ran, eventually in vain, for the vice-president position at his beloved football club Real Madrid, for which he once trained. In 2007 Sainz won the FIA Cross-Country Rally World Cup with the Volkswagen team. In 2008, he won the Central Europe Rally, which was the relocated and rescheduled Dakar Rally for that year because of a terrorist attack. In January 2009, partnering again with Perin, he led the Dakar Rally until crashing out on the 12th stage. Later in 2009, Sainz won Silk Way Rally with Volkswagen team. At the 2010 Dakar Rally, Sainz changed again co-pilot, teaming with fellow Spaniard Lucas Cruz. Sainz edged out teammate Nasser Al-Attiyah to take his second win in the event (the 2008 race in Hungary and Romania was the officially rescheduled and relocated Dakar). In 2010, Sainz also won the Silk Way Rally for the second time. In the 2011 Dakar Rally, Sainz finished third.

Sainz entered Dakar Rally 2013 in a brand-new two-wheel-drive buggy. His teammate was former Dakar-winner Nasser Al-Attiyah and the team was supported by Qatar and Red Bull. Sainz won the first stage, but faced later various problems and was finally forced to retire on the sixth stage due to an engine failure. After the retirement Sainz commented that despite the result, "it was worth coming here with this concept ... I hope the experience will be useful for the future even if I'm not sure whether I'll come back”. However, later Sainz announced he would like to be part of Qatar Red Bull Rally Team and return to the Dakar in 2014. Sainz took part in the 2014 Dakar, but was forced to retire after a crash on stage 10.

In March 2014, it was announced that Peugeot Sport would return to Dakar in 2015 and Sainz joined Cyril Despres to race for Peugeot, driving its Peugeot 2008 DKR. In the rally he retired after a crash. In Dakar 2016, Sainz was forced to retire from the lead after the gearbox of his Peugeot broke. In 2017, Sainz also had to retire after rolling his Peugeot during the fourth stage of the rally. In 2018, Sainz took the third Dakar win of his career with Peugeot team.

After Peugeot shut down its rally raid programme, Sainz joined X-Raid to drive a Mini at the 2019 Dakar Rally. He stuck the car in a large hole on stage 3, damaging the suspension, but limped to the end of the stage and finished the event 13th.

Sainz won his fourth Dakar Rally in 2020, with co-driver Lucas Cruz. The duo registered four stage wins to their name, before finally winning the race with a lead of just 6 minutes and 21 seconds.

Sainz returned to the Dakar Rally in 2021 with Mini, recording three stage victories on the way to an overall third-place finish.

After joining Audi in 2022, Sainz won his fifth Dakar Rally in 2024, becoming the oldest Dakar winner at age 61.

=== Volkswagen's WRC project ===
As Volkswagen Motorsport announced its WRC entry for 2013, Sainz was announced to be part of the WRC project. Volkswagen's motorsport director Kris Nissen told that he needed "10 seconds" to convince Sainz to remain part of the company's efforts in the new programme. Nissen told that the team would need Sainz for some testing of the new car. In November 2011, Sainz had the honour to drive first kilometres with the new Volkswagen Polo R WRC near Trier, Germany, when the team began testing the new car. In late 2011, Nissen also revealed he would like to see Sainz taking part in some rally with the WRC Polo before he calls time on his career. In early 2012, Sainz drove the Polo WRC in its maiden gravel test in Spain with Sébastien Ogier and in summer he tested the Polo WRC in Finland. In October Sainz re-joined his old co-driver Luis Moya to perform course car duties on the San Marino´s annual Rally Legend event with Volkswagen's new-for-2013 Polo R WRC. In December 2012 Sainz dismissed rumours he would drive a Polo WRC in some of the WRC-rallies in 2013, but stated he was available for testing, if needed.

Sainz returned to competing in 2012, as he entered a historic rally with his old co-driver Luis Moya in Spain. The pair competed in a Porsche 911 rally car and won the rally. The pair made a return to historic rallies in March 2013 by winning Rally de España Histórico with a Porsche 911.

== Sainz XE Team ==
(Spain) Acciona | Sainz XE Team
- Founded: November 2020; 6 years ago
- No.: 55
- Current series: Extreme E
- Current drivers: (Spain) Laia Sanz (Jamaica) Fraser McConnell
- Noted drivers: (Spain) Carlos Sainz Sr. (Sweden) Mattias Ekström
- Races: 20
- Wins: 2
- Podiums: 9
- Best qualifiers: 4
- Super sectors: 3
- Points: 337
- First entry: 2021 Desert X-Prix
- Last entry: 2023 Copper X-Prix
- First win: 2023 Desert X-Prix
- Last win: 2023 Island X-Prix II
- Website: accionasainzxeteam.com/en

In November 2020, it was announced that Sainz would team up with QEV Technologies to form Acciona | Sainz XE Team to join the all-electric SUV off-road racing series Extreme E in the inaugural season with Laia Sanz and himself as the drivers line-up. The team made its Extreme E debut at the 2021 Desert X-Prix and achieved a podium finish at the Arctic X-Prix. The team finished in sixth in the teams championship. The team maintained the drivers line-up for the 2022 season and achieved two podiums at the Desert and Copper X-Prixs. The team finished in third in the teams' championship.

The team again maintained the drivers line-up for the 2023 season. However, in January 2023, Sainz suffered multiple spinal fractures after crashing at the Dakar Rally and was replaced by Mattias Ekström for the season. The team started strongly at the Desert X-Prix – in Round 1, the team qualified the fastest, achieved a super sector and finished the race in second place. In Round 2, the team won their first race in Extreme E. The team won its second race in Round 7 at the Island X-Prix II. At the final two rounds of the season, the team finished in second and suffered a DNF respectively, losing the championship to RXR by 11 points.

For the 2024 season, Ekström moved to McLaren XE and was replaced by Fraser McConnell. On 6 September, a week before the scheduled Island X-Prix, Extreme E announced that the rounds in Sardinia and Phoenix were cancelled.

=== Racing overview ===
Year	Name	Car	Tyres	No.	G.	Drivers	Rounds	Pts.	Pos.
2021	(Spain) Acciona | Sainz XE Team	Spark Odyssey 21	C	55.	F	(Spain) Laia Sanz	(1–5)	100	6th
2021	(Spain) Acciona | Sainz XE Team	Spark Odyssey 21	C	55.	M	(Spain) Carlos Sainz Sr.	(1–5)	100	6th
2022	(Spain) Acciona | Sainz XE Team	Spark Odyssey 21	C	55.	F	(Spain) Laia Sanz	(1–5)	66	3rd
2022	(Spain) Acciona | Sainz XE Team	Spark Odyssey 21	C	55.	M	(Spain) Carlos Sainz Sr.	(1–5)	66	3rd
2023	(Spain) Acciona | Sainz XE Team	Spark Odyssey 21	C	55.	F	(Spain) Laia Sanz	(1–10)	171	2nd
2023	(Spain) Acciona | Sainz XE Team	Spark Odyssey 21	C	55.	M	(Sweden) Mattias Ekström	(1–10)	171	2nd
2024	(Spain) Acciona | Sainz XE Team	Spark Odyssey 21	C	55.	F	(Spain) Laia Sanz	(1–4)	76 ^{†}	2nd ^{†}
2024	(Spain) Acciona | Sainz XE Team	Spark Odyssey 21	C	55.	M	(Jamaica) Fraser McConnell	(1–4)	76 ^{†}	2nd ^{†}
2025	(Spain) Acciona | Sainz XE Team	Spark Odyssey 21	Y	55.	F	(Spain) Laia Sanz	(1–2)	N/A	N/A
2025	(Spain) Acciona | Sainz XE Team	Spark Odyssey 21	Y	55.	M	(Jamaica) Fraser McConnell	(1–2)	N/A	N/A

^{†} Season abandoned.

=== Racing summary ===
Year	Series	Races	Wins	Pod.	B/Qual.	S/S	Pts.	Pos.
2021	Extreme E	5	0	1	0	0	100	6th
2022	Extreme E	5	0	2	0	0	66	3rd
2023	Extreme E	10	2	6	4	3	171	2nd
2024	Extreme E	4	1	3	1	1	78 ^{†}	2nd ^{†}
2025	Extreme E	2	0	0	1	0	N/A	N/A
Total		26	3	12	6	4	415	–

^{†} Season abandoned.

=== Complete Extreme E results ===
(Races in bold indicate best qualifiers; races in italics indicate fastest super sector)

Year	Entrant	1	2	3	4	5	6	7	8	9	10	Pts.	Pos.
2021	Acciona | Sainz XE Team	DES (Saudi Arabia); 4	OCE (Senegal); 8	ARC (Greenland); 3	ISL (Italy); 7	JUR (United Kingdom); 5						100	6th
2022	Acciona | Sainz XE Team	DES (Saudi Arabia); 2	ISL1 (Italy); 4	ISL2 (Italy); 4	COP (Chile); 2	ENE (Uruguay); 7						66	3rd
2023	Acciona | Sainz XE Team	**DES1** (Saudi Arabia); 2	DES2 (Saudi Arabia); 1	HYD1 (Scotland); 6	HYD2 (Scotland); 4	**ISL1** (Italy); 2	ISL2 (Italy); 2	**ISL3** (Italy); 1	ISL4 (Italy); 9	COP1 (Chile); 2	**COP2** (Chile); 4	171	2nd
2024	Acciona | Sainz XE Team	DES1 (Saudi Arabia); 4	DES2 (Saudi Arabia); 1	HYD1 (Scotland); 2	**HYD2** (Scotland); 2	ISL1 (Italy); C	ISL2 (Italy); C	ISL3 (Italy); C	ISL4 (Italy); C	VAL1 (United States); C	VAL2 (United States); C	78 ^{†}	2nd ^{†}
2025	Acciona | Sainz XE Team	**DES1** (Saudi Arabia); 4	DES2 (Saudi Arabia); 8									N/A	N/A

^{†} Season abandoned.

== Personal life ==
His son, Carlos Sainz Jr., is a Formula One driver, who has competed for Toro Rosso, Renault, McLaren, Ferrari, and Williams. He also has an older brother named Antonio Sainz, born on 10 December 1957, who was also a rally driver.

== Recognitions ==
- Gold Medal of the Royal Order of Sporting Merit, 21 December 1994
- Olympic Order 1997 – Awarded by Spanish Olympic Committee
- Grand Cross of the Royal Order of Sporting Merit, 30 November 2001
- Gold Medal for Sporting Merit 2001 – Awarded by Ayuntamiento de Madrid
- Medal of youth and sports and associative engagement 2008 – Awarded by the French Government
- In March 2012, Sainz was inducted into the Rally Hall of Fame along with Michèle Mouton.
- In May 2020, Carlos Sainz was crowned The Greatest WRC Driver of all time in a poll of fans and expert journalists.
- On 16 June 2020, Princess of Asturias Awards por Sports.

== Titles ==
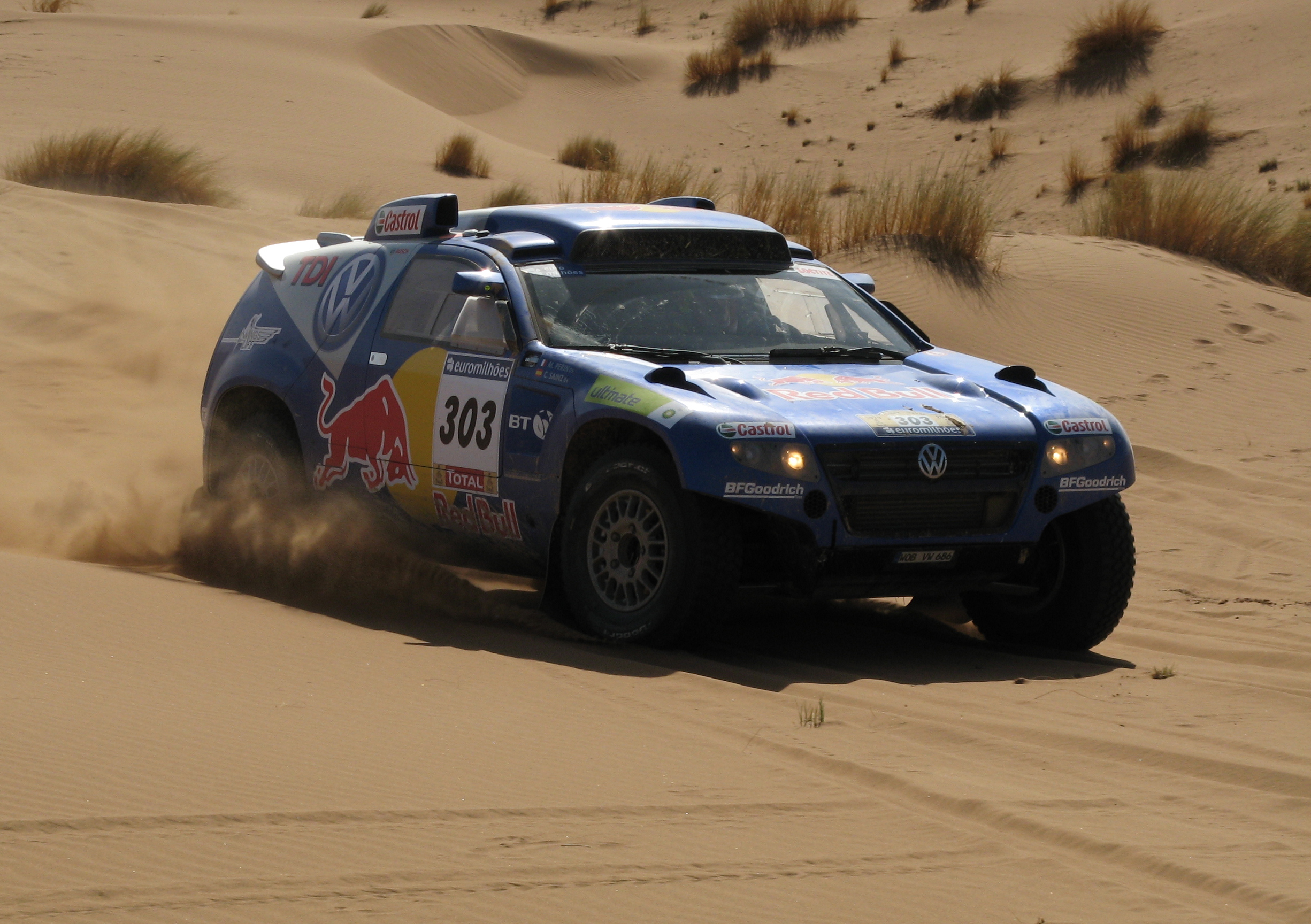
Sainz driving a Volkswagen Race Touareg during the 2007 Dakar Rally.

Season	Title	Car
1987	Spanish Rally Champion	Ford Sierra RS Cosworth
1988	Spanish Rally Champion	Ford Sierra RS Cosworth
1990	Asia-Pacific Rally Champion	Toyota Celica GT-Four ST165
1990	World Rally Champion	Toyota Celica GT-Four ST165
1992	World Rally Champion	Toyota Celica Turbo 4WD ST185
1997	Champion of Champions	Various
2007	FIA Cross-Country Rally World Cup	Volkswagen Race Touareg
2008	Central Europe Rally (cars)	Volkswagen Race Touareg
2010	2010 Dakar Rally Winner (cars)	Volkswagen Race Touareg
2018	2018 Dakar Rally Winner (cars)	Peugeot 3008 DKR Maxi
2020	2020 Dakar Rally Winner (cars)	Mini John Cooper Works Buggy
2024	2024 Dakar Rally Winner (cars)	Audi RS Q e-tron

== WRC victories ==
#	Event	Season	Co-driver	Car
1	(Greece) Acropolis Rally	1990	Luis Moya	Toyota Celica GT-Four ST165
2	Rally New Zealand	1990	Luis Moya	Toyota Celica GT-Four ST165
3	(Finland) 1000 Lakes Rally	1990	Luis Moya	Toyota Celica GT-Four ST165
4	(United Kingdom) RAC Rally	1990	Luis Moya	Toyota Celica GT-Four ST165
5	(Monaco) Rallye Automobile Monte Carlo	1991	Luis Moya	Toyota Celica GT-Four ST165
6	Rallye de Portugal	1991	Luis Moya	Toyota Celica GT-Four ST165
7	Tour de Corse – Rallye de France	1991	Luis Moya	Toyota Celica GT-Four ST165
8	Rally New Zealand	1991	Luis Moya	Toyota Celica GT-Four ST165
9	Rally Argentina	1991	Luis Moya	Toyota Celica GT-Four ST165
10	(Kenya) Safari Rally	1992	Luis Moya	Toyota Celica Turbo 4WD
11	Rally New Zealand	1992	Luis Moya	Toyota Celica Turbo 4WD
12	(Spain) Rallye Catalunya-Costa Brava (Rallye de España)	1992	Luis Moya	Toyota Celica Turbo 4WD
13	(United Kingdom) RAC Rally	1992	Luis Moya	Toyota Celica Turbo 4WD
14	(Greece) Acropolis Rally	1994	Luis Moya	Subaru Impreza 555
15	(Monaco) Rallye Automobile Monte Carlo	1995	Luis Moya	Subaru Impreza 555
16	Rallye de Portugal	1995	Luis Moya	Subaru Impreza 555
17	(Spain) Rallye Catalunya-Costa Brava (Rallye de España)	1995	Luis Moya	Subaru Impreza 555
18	Rally Indonesia	1996	Luis Moya	Ford Escort RS Cosworth
19	(Greece) Acropolis Rally	1997	Luis Moya	Ford Escort WRC
20	Rally Indonesia	1997	Luis Moya	Ford Escort WRC
21	(Monaco) Rallye Automobile Monte Carlo	1998	Luis Moya	Toyota Corolla WRC
22	Rally New Zealand	1998	Luis Moya	Toyota Corolla WRC
23	Cyprus Rally	2000	Luis Moya	Ford Focus RS WRC 00
24	Rally Argentina	2002	Luis Moya	Ford Focus RS WRC 02
25	Rally of Turkey	2003	Marc Martí	Citroën Xsara WRC
26	Rally Argentina	2004	Marc Martí	Citroën Xsara WRC

== Dakar Rally stage wins ==
#	Date	From	To	Edition	Co-Driver	Car
1	31 December 2005	(Portugal) Lisbon	(Portugal) Portimão	2006 Dakar Rally	(Germany) Andreas Schulz	(Germany) Volkswagen
2	1 January 2006	(Portugal) Portimão	(Spain) Málaga	2006 Dakar Rally	(Germany) Andreas Schulz	(Germany) Volkswagen
3	3 January 2006	(Morocco) Er Rachidia	(Morocco) Ouarzazate	2006 Dakar Rally	(Germany) Andreas Schulz	(Germany) Volkswagen
4	10 January 2006	(Mauritania) Kiffa	(Mali) Kayes	2006 Dakar Rally	(Germany) Andreas Schulz	(Germany) Volkswagen
5	7 January 2007	(Portugal) Portimão	(Spain) Málaga	2007 Dakar Rally	(France) Michel Périn	(Germany) Volkswagen
6	10 January 2007	(Morocco) Ouarzazate	(Morocco) Tan-Tan	2007 Dakar Rally	(France) Michel Périn	(Germany) Volkswagen
7	18 January 2007	(Mauritania) Ayoun el Atrous	(Mali) Kayes	2007 Dakar Rally	(France) Michel Périn	(Germany) Volkswagen
8	19 January 2007	(Mali) Kayes	(Senegal) Tambacounda	2007 Dakar Rally	(France) Michel Périn	(Germany) Volkswagen
9	20 January 2007	(Senegal) Tambacounda	(Senegal) Dakar	2007 Dakar Rally	(France) Michel Périn	(Germany) Volkswagen
10	4 January 2009	(Argentina) Santa Rosa	(Argentina) Puerto Madryn	2009 Dakar Rally	(France) Michel Périn	(Germany) Volkswagen
11	6 January 2009	(Argentina) Jacobacci	(Argentina) Neuquén	2009 Dakar Rally	(France) Michel Périn	(Germany) Volkswagen
12	9 January 2009	(Argentina) Mendoza	(Chile) Valparaíso	2009 Dakar Rally	(France) Michel Périn	(Germany) Volkswagen
13	11 January 2009	(Chile) Valparaíso	(Chile) La Serena	2009 Dakar Rally	(France) Michel Périn	(Germany) Volkswagen
14	12 January 2009	(Chile) La Serena	(Chile) Copiapó	2009 Dakar Rally	(France) Michel Périn	(Germany) Volkswagen
15	13 January 2009	(Chile) Copiapó	(Chile) Copiapó	2009 Dakar Rally	(France) Michel Périn	(Germany) Volkswagen
16	12 January 2010	(Chile) La Serena	(Chile) Santiago	2010 Dakar Rally	(Spain) Lucas Cruz	(Germany) Volkswagen
17	14 January 2010	(Argentina) San Juan	(Argentina) San Rafael	2010 Dakar Rally	(Spain) Lucas Cruz	(Germany) Volkswagen
18	2 January 2011	(Argentina) Buenos Aires	(Argentina) Córdoba	2011 Dakar Rally	(Spain) Lucas Cruz	(Germany) Volkswagen
19	3 January 2011	(Argentina) Córdoba	(Argentina) San Miguel de Tucumán	2011 Dakar Rally	(Spain) Lucas Cruz	(Germany) Volkswagen
20	5 January 2011	(Argentina) San Salvador de Jujuy	(Chile) Calama	2011 Dakar Rally	(Spain) Lucas Cruz	(Germany) Volkswagen
21	7 January 2011	(Chile) Iquique	(Chile) Arica	2011 Dakar Rally	(Spain) Lucas Cruz	(Germany) Volkswagen
22	11 January 2011	(Chile) Copiapó	(Chile) Copiapó	2011 Dakar Rally	(Spain) Lucas Cruz	(Germany) Volkswagen
23	14 January 2011	(Argentina) San Juan	(Argentina) Córdoba	2011 Dakar Rally	(Spain) Lucas Cruz	(Germany) Volkswagen
24	15 January 2011	(Argentina) Córdoba	(Argentina) Buenos Aires	2011 Dakar Rally	(Spain) Lucas Cruz	(Germany) Volkswagen
25	5 January 2013	(Peru) Lima	(Peru) Pisco	2013 Dakar Rally	(Germany) Timo Gottschalk	(United States) Demon Jefferies
26	8 January 2014	(Argentina) San Juan	(Argentina) Chilecito	2014 Dakar Rally	(Germany) Timo Gottschalk	(France) SMG
27	12 January 2014	(Argentina) Salta	(Argentina) Salta	2014 Dakar Rally	(Germany) Timo Gottschalk	(France) SMG
28	9 January 2016	(Bolivia) Uyuni	(Argentina) Salta	2016 Dakar Rally	(Spain) Lucas Cruz	(France) Peugeot
29	12 January 2016	(Argentina) Belén	(Argentina) Belén	2016 Dakar Rally	(Spain) Lucas Cruz	(France) Peugeot
30	11 January 2018	(Peru) Arequipa	(Bolivia) La Paz	2018 Dakar Rally	(Spain) Lucas Cruz	(France) Peugeot
31	13 January 2018	(Bolivia) La Paz	(Bolivia) Uyuni	2018 Dakar Rally	(Spain) Lucas Cruz	(France) Peugeot
32	17 January 2019	(Peru) Pisco	(Peru) Lima	2019 Dakar Rally	(Spain) Lucas Cruz	(United Kingdom) Mini
33	7 January 2020	(Saudi Arabia) Neom	(Saudi Arabia) Neom	2020 Dakar Rally	(Spain) Lucas Cruz	(United Kingdom) Mini
34	9 January 2020	(Saudi Arabia) Al-ʿUla	(Saudi Arabia) Ha'il	2020 Dakar Rally	(Spain) Lucas Cruz	(United Kingdom) Mini
35	12 January 2020	(Saudi Arabia) Riyadh	(Saudi Arabia) Wadi Al Dwasir	2020 Dakar Rally	(Spain) Lucas Cruz	(United Kingdom) Mini
36	15 January 2020	(Saudi Arabia) Haradh	(Saudi Arabia) Shubaytah	2020 Dakar Rally	(Spain) Lucas Cruz	(United Kingdom) Mini
37	3 January 2021	(Saudi Arabia) Jeddah	(Saudi Arabia) Bisha	2021 Dakar Rally	(Spain) Lucas Cruz	(United Kingdom) Mini
38	8 January 2021	(Saudi Arabia) Buraydah	(Saudi Arabia) Ha'il	2021 Dakar Rally	(Spain) Lucas Cruz	(United Kingdom) Mini
39	14 January 2021	(Saudi Arabia) Yanbu	(Saudi Arabia) Jeddah	2021 Dakar Rally	(Spain) Lucas Cruz	(United Kingdom) Mini
40	4 January 2022	(Saudi Arabia) Al Qaisumah	(Saudi Arabia) Al Qaisumah	2022 Dakar Rally	(Spain) Lucas Cruz	(Germany) Audi
41	13 January 2022	(Saudi Arabia) Bisha	(Saudi Arabia) Bisha	2022 Dakar Rally	(Spain) Lucas Cruz	(Germany) Audi
42	1 January 2023	(Saudi Arabia) Sea Camp	(Saudi Arabia) Sea Camp	2023 Dakar Rally	(Spain) Lucas Cruz	(Germany) Audi

== Racing record ==
=== Complete WRC results ===
Year	Entrant	Car	1	2	3	4	5	6	7	8	9	10	11	12	13	14	15	16	Pos	Points
1987	Marlboro Racing Team	Ford Sierra RS Cosworth	MON	SWE	POR; Ret	KEN	FRA; 7	GRC	USA	NZL	ARG	FIN	CIV	ITA					35th	7
1987	RAC de España	Ford Sierra RS Cosworth													GBR; 8				35th	7
1988	Carlos Sainz	Ford Sierra RS Cosworth	MON	SWE	POR; Ret														11th	26
1988	Ford Motor Co	Ford Sierra RS Cosworth				KEN	FRA; 5	GRC	USA	NZL	ARG	FIN; 6	CIV	ITA; 5	GBR; 7				11th	26
1989	Marlboro Repsol Toyota Team Europe	Toyota Celica GT-Four ST165	SWE	MON; Ret	POR; Ret	KEN	FRA; Ret	GRC; Ret	NZL	ARG	FIN; 3	AUS	ITA; 3	CIV	GBR; 2				8th	39
1990	Marlboro Repsol Toyota Team Europe	Toyota Celica GT-Four ST165	MON; 2	POR; Ret	KEN; 4	FRA; 2	GRC; 1	NZL; 1	ARG; 2	FIN; 1	AUS; 2	ITA; 3	CIV	GBR; 1					1st	140
1991	Marlboro Repsol Toyota Team Europe	Toyota Celica GT-Four ST165	MON; 1	SWE	POR; 1	KEN; Ret	FRA; 1	GRC; 2	NZL; 1	ARG; 1	FIN; 4	AUS; Ret	ITA; 6	CIV	ESP; Ret	GBR; 3			2nd	143
1992	Marlboro Repsol Toyota Team Europe	Toyota Celica Turbo 4WD	MON; 2	SWE	POR; 3	KEN; 1	FRA; 4	GRC; Ret	NZL; 1	ARG; 2	FIN	AUS; 3	ITA	CIV	ESP; 1	GBR; 1			1st	144
1993	Repsol Jolly Club	Lancia Delta HF Integrale	MON; 14	SWE	POR; Ret	KEN	FRA; 4	GRC; 2	ARG; Ret	NZL; 4	FIN	AUS; Ret	ITA; DSQ	ESP; Ret	GBR				8th	35
1994	555 Subaru World Rally Team	Subaru Impreza 555	MON; 3	POR; 4	KEN	FRA; 2	GRC; 1	ARG; 2	NZL; Ret	FIN; 3	ITA; 2	GBR; Ret							2nd	99
1995	555 Subaru World Rally Team	Subaru Impreza 555	MON; 1	SWE; Ret	POR; 1	FRA; 4	NZL	AUS; Ret	ESP; 1	GBR; 2									2nd	85
1996	Repsol Ford Racing	Ford Escort RS Cosworth	SWE; 2	KEN; Ret	IDN; 1	GRC; 3	ARG; 2	FIN; Ret	AUS; 3	ITA; 2	ESP; Ret								3rd	89
1997	Repsol Ford Racing	Ford Escort WRC	MON; 2	SWE; 2	KEN; Ret	POR; Ret	ESP; 10	FRA; 2	ARG; Ret	GRC; 1	NZL; 2	FIN; Ret	IDN; 1	ITA; 4	AUS; Ret	GBR; 3			3rd	51
1998	Castrol Toyota Team Europe	Toyota Corolla WRC	MON; 1	SWE; 2	KEN; Ret	POR; 2	ESP; 7	FRA; 8	ARG; 2	GRC; 4	NZL; 1	FIN; 2	ITA; 4	AUS; 2	GBR; Ret				2nd	56
1999	Castrol Toyota Team Europe	Toyota Corolla WRC	MON; Ret	SWE; 2	KEN; 3	POR; 2	ESP; Ret	FRA; 3	ARG; 5	GRC; 2	NZL; 6	FIN; 3	CHN; 3	ITA; Ret	AUS; 2	GBR; Ret			5th	44
2000	Martini Ford Racing	Ford Focus RS WRC 00	MON; 2	SWE; Ret	KEN; 4	POR; 3	ESP; 3	ARG; Ret	GRC; 2	NZL; 3	FIN; 14	CYP; 1	FRA; 3	ITA; 5	AUS; DSQ	GBR; 4			3rd	46
2001	Martini Ford Racing	Ford Focus RS WRC 01	MON; 2	SWE; 3	POR; 2	ESP; 5	ARG; 3	CYP; 3	GRC; Ret	KEN; Ret	FIN; 6	NZL; 4	ITA; 4	FRA; Ret	AUS; 8	GBR; WD			6th	33
2002	Martini Ford Racing	Ford Focus RS WRC 02	MON; 3	SWE; 3	FRA; 6	ESP; Ret	CYP; 11	ARG; 1	GRC; 3	KEN; Ret	FIN; 4	GER; 8	ITA; Ret	NZL; 4	AUS; 4	GBR; 3			3rd	36
2003	Citroën Sport Total	Citroën Xsara WRC	MON; 3	SWE; 9	TUR; 1	NZL; 12	ARG; 2	GRC; 2	CYP; 5	GER; 6	FIN; 4	AUS; 5	ITA; 4	FRA; 2	ESP; 7	GBR; Ret			3rd	63
2004	Citroën Sport Total	Citroën Xsara WRC	MON; Ret	SWE; 5	MEX; 3	NZL; 6	CYP; 3	GRC; 19	TUR; 4	ARG; 1	FIN; 3	GER; 3	JPN; 5	GBR; 4	ITA; 3	FRA; 3	ESP; 3	AUS; WD	4th	73
2005	Citroën Sport Total	Citroën Xsara WRC	MON	SWE	MEX	NZL	ITA	CYP	TUR; 4	GRC; 3	ARG	FIN	GER	GBR	JPN	FRA	ESP	AUS	13th	11

=== Dakar Rally results ===
Year	Class	Vehicle	Position	Stages won
2006	Car	(Germany) Volkswagen	11th	4
2007	Car	(Germany) Volkswagen	9th	5
2008	not held			
2009	Car	(Germany) Volkswagen	DNF	6
2010	Car	(Germany) Volkswagen	1st	2
2011	Car	(Germany) Volkswagen	3rd	7
2012	did not enter			
2013	Car	(United States) Demon Jefferies	DNF	1
2014	Car	(France) SMG	DNF	2
2015	Car	(France) Peugeot	DNF	0
2016	Car	(France) Peugeot	DNF	2
2017	Car	(France) Peugeot	DNF	0
2018	Car	(France) Peugeot	1st	2
2019	Car	(United Kingdom) Mini	13th	1
2020	Car	(United Kingdom) Mini	1st	4
2021	Car	(United Kingdom) Mini	3rd	3
2022	Car	(Germany) Audi	12th	2
2023	Car	(Germany) Audi	DNF	1
2024	Car	(Germany) Audi	1st	0
2025	Car	(United States) Ford	DNF	0
2026	Car	(United States) Ford	5th	0

=== Complete Extreme E results ===
(key)

Year	Team	Car	1	2	3	4	5	6	7	8	9	10	Pos.	Points
2021	Acciona | Sainz XE Team	Spark ODYSSEY 21	DES; Q 2	DES; R 4	OCE; Q 9	OCE; R 8	ARC; Q 6	ARC; R 3	ISL; Q 4	ISL; R 7	JUR; Q 3	JUR; R 5	5th	90
2022	Acciona | Sainz XE Team	Spark ODYSSEY 21	DES; 2	ISL1; 4	ISL2; 4	COP; 2	ENE; 7						3rd	60

=== Complete World Rally-Raid Championship results ===
(key)

Year	Team	Car	Class	1	2	3	4	5	Pos.	Points
2023	Team Audi Sport	Audi RS Q e-tron E2	T1+	DAK; Ret	ABU	SON	DES	MOR; 12	21st	11
2024	Team Audi Sport	Audi RS Q e-tron	T1+	DAK; 1	ABU	PRT	DES	MOR		
2025	Ford M sport		T1+	DAK; Ret						

Awards and achievements
Preceded by Miki Biasion	Autosport; International Rally Driver Award; 1990–1991	Succeeded by Didier Auriol
Sporting positions
Preceded by Miki Biasion	World Rally Champion; 1990	Succeeded by Juha Kankkunen
Preceded by Rod Millen	Asia-Pacific Rally Champion; 1990	Succeeded by Ross Dunkerton
Preceded by Juha Kankkunen	World Rally Champion; 1992	Succeeded by Juha Kankkunen
Preceded by Didier Auriol	Race of Champions; Champion of Champions; 1997	Succeeded by Colin McRae
Preceded by Giniel de Villiers	Dakar Rally; Car Winner; 2010	Succeeded by Nasser Al-Attiyah
Preceded by Stéphane Peterhansel	Dakar Rally; Car Winner; 2018	Succeeded by Nasser Al-Attiyah
Preceded by Nasser Al-Attiyah	Dakar Rally; Car Winner; 2020	Succeeded by Stéphane Peterhansel
Records
Preceded by Juha Kankkunen; 153 starts (1979, 1982–2002, 2010)	Most rally starts 196 starts, (1987–2005); 154th at the 2002 Tour de Corse	Succeeded by Jari-Matti Latvala; 209 starts 197th at the 2019 Rally Sweden
Preceded by Colin McRae; 25 wins (1987–2003, 2005–2006)	Most rally wins 26 wins, 26th at the 2004 Rally Argentina	Succeeded by Sébastien Loeb; 79 wins 27th at the 2006 Rally Japan
