= European Historic Rally Championship =

Rallying championship series

- Category: Rallying
- Country: Europe
- Classes: 4

The European Historic Rally Championship, officially the FIA European Historic Sporting Rally Championship, is a classic rally series held on the European continent and organised by the FIA since 1989. Intended exclusively for historic vehicles, since 2013 the competition has been divided into four categories. From 2007 to 2012 it was divided into three categories and from 2003 to 2006 into two categories.

== List of events ==
2025

- (Spain) Rally Costa Brava
- (Czech Republic) Historic Vltava Rallye
- (France) Rallye Antibes - Côte d'Azur Historic
- (Belgium) Ypres Historic Rally
- (Austria) Historic Rally Weiz
- (Finland) Lahti Historic Rally
- (Greece) Historic Acropolis Rally
- (Italy) Rally Elba Storico
- (Spain) Rally de Asturias Histórico
- (Portugal) Historic Rally Fafe

Former

- (Spain) Rally de España Histórico
- (Italy) Sanremo Rally Storico
- (Switzerland) Rallye du Chablais VHC
- (Switzerland) Rallye Historique du Valais
- (Republic of Ireland) International Rally of the Lakes
- (Hungary) Mecsek Rallye - Historic
- (Italy) Rally di San Marino Historic
- Rally Estonia Historic
- (Italy) Rally Alpi Orientali Historic
- (Germany) Lausitz Rallye - Historic
- (Czech Republic) Rally Bohemia Historic
- (France) Rallye Historique du Var
- (Italy) Rally del Corallo
- Historic Cyprus Rally
- (Italy) Trofeo Florio Historic Rally - Città di Cefalu
- (United Arab Emirates) Abu Dhabi Classic Rally
- (Austria) Ostarrichi Rallye - Historic
- (Germany) Saarland Rallye Classic
- (Austria) BP Ultimate Rallye
- (Italy) Circuito di Cremona Historic
- (Spain) Trofeo Baleares
- (Finland) Historic Arctic Lapland Rally
- (Italy) Rally 500 Minuti Storico
- (Czech Republic) Horácká historic rally
- (Czech Republic) Rallysprint Sosnová
- (Finland) 1000 Lakes Historic Rally
- (Germany) Bavaria Trophy
- (United Kingdom) RAC Historic Rally
- (Norway) Viking Rally
- (Netherlands) Tulip Historic Rallye
- (Belgium) Belgian Historic Rally
- (Italy) Classic Cup
- (Italy) Coppa D´Italia
- (France) Rallye des Vins Mâcon
- (United Kingdom) Manx Historic Rally

== Champions ==
Year	Driver	Co-driver	Category	Notes
1989				
1990				
1991				
1992				
1993				
1994	(Sweden) Åke Andersson			
1995	(Czech Republic) Jan Trajbold st.			
1996	(Czech Republic) Jindřich Indra			
1997	(Czech Republic) Jan Trajbold st.			
1998				
1999	(Czech Republic) Jan Trajbold st.			
2000	(Czech Republic) Jan Trajbold st.			
2001				
2003	(Italy) Antonio Parisi		G	
2003	(Germany) Georg Alber		F	
2004	(Germany) Henning Volle		1	
2004	(Czech Republic) Ladislav Veselý		2	
2005	(Germany) Wolfgang Pfeiffer		1	
2005	(United Kingdom) Ernie Graham		2	
2006	(France) Pierre Dominique Dantoine		1	
2006	(Germany) Michael Stoschek		2	
2007	(Italy) Andrea Polli		1	
2007	(Italy) Antonio Parisi		2	
2007	(Italy) Roberto Bigoni		3	
2008	(Italy) Antonio Parisi		1	
2008	(Norway) Valter Christian Jensen		2	
2008	(San Marino) Graziano Muccioli		3	
2009	(Italy) Antonio Parisi	(Italy) Giuseppe D'Angelo	1	
2009	(Norway) Valter Christian Jensen	(Norway) Erik Pedersen	2	
2009	(Italy) Enrico Brazzoli	(Italy) Paola Valmassoi	3	
2010	(Germany) Wolfgang Pfeiffer	(Germany) Ulli Windt	1	
2010	(Norway) Valter Chr. Jensen	(Norway) Erik Pedersen	2	
2010	(Italy) Pierangelo Rossi	(Italy) Luca Beltrame	3	
2011	(Estonia) Alar Hermanson	(Italy) Roberto Brea	1	
2011	(Czech Republic) Miroslav Janota	(Czech Republic) Pavel Dresler	2	
2011	(Italy) Enrico Brazzoli	(Republic of Ireland) Ross Forde	3	
2012	(Italy) Antonio Parisi	(Italy) Giuseppe D'angelo	1	
2012	(Sweden) Mats Myrsell	(Sweden) Esko Junttila	2	
2012	(Austria) Ernst Harrach	(Austria) Leopold Welsersheimb	3	
2013	(Italy) Luigi Zampaglione	(Sweden) Karl-Erik Magnusson	1	
2013	(Sweden) Mats Myrsell	(Sweden) Esko Junttila	2	
2013	(Austria) Karl Wagner	(Austria) Gerda Zauner	3	
2013	(Italy) Massimo "Pedro" Pedretti	(Norway) Erik Pedersen	4	
2014	(Italy) Luigi Zampaglioni		1	
2014	(Italy) Lucio Da Zanche		2	
2014	(Austria) Karl Wagner		3	
2014	(Italy) Luigi "Lucky" Battistolli		4	
2015	(Finland) Sverre Norrgård		1	
2015	(Sweden) Mats Myrsell		2	
2015	(Italy) Carlo Marenzana		3	
2015	(Italy) Massimo "Pedro" Pedretti		4	
2016	(Italy) Antonio Parisi		1	
2016	(Norway) Valter Christian Jensen		2	
2016	(Finland) Esa Peltonen		3	
2016	(Italy) Massimo "Pedro" Pedretti		4	
2017	(Italy) Antonio Parisi	(Italy) Giuseppe D'angelo	1	
2017	(France) Érik Comas	(France) Yannick Roche	2	
2017	(Italy) Maurizio Pagella	(Italy) Roberto Brea	3	
2017	(Italy) Luigi "Lucky" Battistolli	(Italy) Fabrizia Pons	4	
2018	(Italy) Antonio Parisi	(Italy) Giuseppe D'angelo	1	
2018	(Hungary) László Mekler	(Hungary) Edit Mekler-Miko	2	
2018	(Austria) Karl Wagner	(Austria) Gerda Zauner	3	
2018	(Norway) Valter Jensen	(Norway) Erik Pedersen	4	
2019	(Italy) Antonio Parisi	(Italy) Giuseppe D'angelo	1	
2019	(Sweden) Anders Johnsen	(Sweden) Ingrid Johnsen	2	
2019	(Austria) Karl Wagner	(Austria) Gerda Zauner	3	
2019	(Italy) Luigi "Lucky" Battistolli	(Italy) Fabrizia Pons	4	
2021	(Italy) Antonio Parisi	(Italy) Giuseppe D'angelo	1	
2021	(Czech Republic) Vojtěch Štajf	(Czech Republic) Vladimir Zelinka	2	
2021	(Italy) Andrea "Zippo" Zivian	(Italy) Denis Piceno	3	
2021	(Spain) Daniel Alonso Villarón	(Germany) Jürgen Nolte	4	
2022	(United Kingdom) Ernie Graham	(United Kingdom) Karen Graham	1	
2022	(Italy) Pietro Corredig	(Italy) Sonia Borghese	2	
2022	(Italy) Andrea "Zippo" Zivian	(Germany) Renate Mayr	3	
2022	(Finland) Ville Silvasti	(Sweden) Esko Junttila	4	
2023	(United Kingdom) Ernie Graham	(United Kingdom) Karen Graham	1	
2023	(Norway) Valter Chr. Jensen	(Norway) Erik Pedersen	2	
2023	(Austria) Karl Wagner	(Austria) Gerda Zauner	3	
2023	(Italy) Luigi "Lucky" Battistolli	(Italy) Fabrizia Pons	4	
