= FIA Motorsport Games =

Biennial motorsport event

- Category: Motorsport
- Country: International
- Inaugural season: 2019
- Teams: 72 (2022)
- Official website: https://www.fiamotorsportgames.com

The FIA Motorsport Games is a biennial motorsport event administered by the Fédération Internationale de l'Automobile (FIA). It includes competitions from multiple motorsport disciplines and is entered by national motorsport authorities under their national flags. Each competition awards gold, silver and bronze medals which contribute to an overall medals table determining the winning country of the event.

== History ==
The first event took place at Vallelunga Circuit in Italy in 2019 and was won by Russia.

The 2020 edition was postponed to 2022 because of the COVID-19 pandemic. On 6 August 2021, the FIA announced that the 2022 event would be hosted at Circuit Paul Ricard in Marseille. It took place on 29–30 October 2022. Russia was banned from participating in the 2022 edition because of its invasion of Ukraine.The opening ceremony 2022 featured performances by fire and light show artists including Slovak group Anta Agni.

From the second edition (2022) onward, the FIA Motorsport Games will be held every two years, as opposed to an annual format. The next edition is scheduled to occur in 2026 at a destination not yet revealed.

== Disciplines and competitions ==
There have been sixteen competitions (categories) from nine motorsport disciplines included in the programme at one point or another in the history of the games.

Discipline		Competition	Years
Circuit	Formula racing	Formula 4	2019, 2022, 2024
Circuit	Sports car racing	GT3 Relay	2019, 2022, 2024
Circuit	Sports car racing	GT3 Sprint	2022, 2024
Circuit	Sports car racing	Ferrari Challenge	2024
Circuit	Touring car racing	TCR Touring Car	2019, 2022, 2024
Drifting			2019, 2022, 2024
Rallying		Group Historic	2022, 2024
Rallying		Group Historic Gravel	2024
Rallying		Group Historic Tarmac	2024
Rallying		Group Rally2	2022, 2024
Rallying		Group Rally2 Gravel	2024
Rallying		Group Rally2 Tarmac	2024
Rallying		Group Rally4	2022, 2024
Rallying		Group Rally4 Gravel	2024
Rallying		Group Rally4 Tarmac	2024
Off-road	Autocross	Cross car Junior	2022, 2024
Off-road	Autocross	Cross car Senior	2022, 2024
Off-road	Autocross	Cross car Mini	2024
Karting		Karting Endurance	2022, 2024
Karting		Karting Junior	2022, 2024
Karting		Karting Senior	2022, 2024
Karting		Karting Mini	2024
Electric Street	Auto Slalom	Auto Slalom	2022, 2024
Electric Street	Auto Slalom	Karting Slalom	2019, 2022, 2024
Esports		Esports GT	2019, 2022, 2024
Esports		Esports F4	2024

== All-time medal table ==
The table below uses official data provided by the FIA.

No.	Nation	Gold	Silver	Bronze	Total	Games
1	Italy	7	1	1	9	3
2	Spain	6	10	10	26	3
3	Germany	5	4	2	11	3
4	Belgium	4	3	2	9	3
5	France	4	0	1	5	3
6	Great Britain	3	3	3	9	3
7	Netherlands	3	3	1	7	3
8	Turkey	2	4	0	6	3
9	Brazil	2	2	2	6	3
10	Australia	2	0	1	3	3
11	Slovakia	1	2	1	4	3
12	Poland	1	1	2	4	3
13	Peru	1	1	0	2	2
13	Portugal	1	1	0	2	3
15	Russia	1	0	2	3	1
16	Lithuania	1	0	1	2	3
17	Japan	1	0	0	1	3
17	Latvia	1	0	0	1	3
17	Ukraine	1	0	0	1	3
17	Argentina	1	0	0	1	2
21	Czech Republic	0	3	4	7	3

== List of Motorsport Games ==
Motorsport Games	No.	Host	Games dates	Race Circuit	Sports (Disciplines)	Competitors			Events	Nations	Top nation
Motorsport Games	No.	Host	Games dates	Race Circuit	Sports (Disciplines)	Total	Men	Women	Events	Nations	Top nation
2019	I	(Italy) Rome	1–3 November	ACI Vallelunga Circuit, Campagnano di Roma	6	194	162	32	6	50	Russia
2020	-	Not held due to the COVID-19 pandemic									
2021	-	Not held due to the COVID-19 pandemic									
2022	II	(France) Marseille	26–30 October	Circuit Paul Ricard, Le Castellet, Var	16	475	397	78	16	72	Italy
2024	III	(Spain) Valencia	24–27 October	Circuit Ricardo Tormo, Cheste, Valencian Community	16	644	-	-	26	85	Spain
2026	IV	TBC	TBA	TBC		-	-	-	-	-	-
