= 2024 FIA Motorsport Games =

Motorsports competition in Valencia, Spain

The 2024 FIA Motorsport Games was the third edition of the FIA Motorsport Games. The event took place on 23–27 October 2024 with Valencia as a host city; the Circuit Ricardo Tormo in Cheste was the main venue, hosting all of the circuit-based car categories including drifting, whilst the Aspar Circuit in Guadassuar hosted the Karting and Cross Car disciplines, and the eSports competitions and opening ceremony were held at the City of Arts and Sciences in the centre of Valencia.

Locations of venues used in the 2024 FIA Motorsport Games

== Events ==
On 6 July 2023, it was announced that the Motorsport Games would be expanded from 16 to 26 disciplines for its third edition. On 29 April 2024, it was announced that the Ferrari Challenge will join under the moniker of "GT Single Make" bringing the total number of competition categories to 27. On 14 August 2024, it was announced that the Crosscar Cup wil expand with the introduction of Crosscar Cup Mini, and bringing the total number of competition categories to 28. However, on 27 September 2024, it was announced that Truck Racing would be postponed for the next edition, holding instead a demonstration event. While no official announcement was made, a provisional timetable published on 24 September 2024 did not include the Rally All-Stars category, leaving the final number of competition categories at 26.

Circuit

- GT Relay
- GT Single Make
- GT Sprint
- Touring Car Cup
- Formula 4 Cup
- Drifting Cup

Rally

- Rally Cup Rally2 (Rally / Gravel / Tarmac)
- Rally Cup Rally4 (Rally / Gravel / Tarmac)
- Rally Historic Cup (Rally / Gravel / Tarmac)

Off-Road

- Crosscar Cup (Senior / Junior / Mini)

Karting

- Karting Sprint Cup (Senior / Junior / Mini)
- Karting Endurance Cup

Electric Street

- Karting Slalom
- Auto Slalom

Esports

- Esports GT Cup
- Esports F4 Cup

== Teams ==
Host Nation (Spain)

| Team | GT Relay | GT Sprint | GT Single Make | Touring Car | Formula 4 | Drifting | Esports F4 | Esports GT | Crosscar Sr | Crosscar Jr | Crosscar Mini | Rally2 | | | Rally4 | | | RallyH | | | Karting Sprint Sr | Karting Sprint Jr | Karting Sprint Mini | Karting Endurance | Karting Slalom | Auto Slalom | Total |
| Team | GT Relay | GT Sprint | GT Single Make | Touring Car | Formula 4 | Drifting | Esports F4 | Esports GT | Crosscar Sr | Crosscar Jr | Crosscar Mini | R | G | T | R | G | T | R | G | T | Karting Sprint Sr | Karting Sprint Jr | Karting Sprint Mini | Karting Endurance | Karting Slalom | Auto Slalom | Total |
|---|---|---|---|---|---|---|---|---|---|---|---|---|---|---|---|---|---|---|---|---|---|---|---|---|---|---|---|
| Team Albania | No | No | No | No | No | No | Yes | Yes | No | No | No | No | No | No | No | No | No | No | No | No | No | No | Yes | No | Yes | Yes | 5 |
| Team Andorra | No | No | No | No | No | No | Yes | Yes | No | No | No | No | No | No | No | No | No | No | No | No | Yes | No | No | No | No | Yes | 4 |
| Team Angola | No | No | No | No | Yes | No | No | No | No | No | No | No | No | No | No | No | No | No | No | No | No | No | No | No | No | No | 1 |
| Team Antigua and Barbuda | No | No | Yes | No | No | No | No | No | No | No | No | No | No | No | No | No | No | No | No | No | No | No | No | No | No | No | 1 |
| Team Argentina | No | No | No | Yes | Yes | Yes | Yes | Yes | No | Yes | No | No | No | No | No | Yes | No | No | No | No | Yes | Yes | Yes | Yes | No | No | 10 |
| Team Armenia | No | No | No | No | No | No | Yes | Yes | No | No | No | No | No | No | No | No | No | No | No | No | Yes | No | No | Yes | No | No | 4 |
| Team Australia | No | No | No | No | Yes | No | Yes | Yes | No | No | No | No | No | No | No | No | No | No | No | No | Yes | Yes | Yes | No | No | Yes | 7 |
| Team Austria | No | No | No | No | Yes | No | No | Yes | No | No | No | No | No | No | No | No | No | No | No | No | No | Yes | No | No | No | No | 3 |
| Team Azerbaijan | No | No | No | No | No | No | No | Yes | No | No | No | No | No | No | No | No | No | No | No | No | No | No | No | No | No | No | 1 |
| (The Bahamas) Team Bahamas | No | No | No | No | No | No | Yes | Yes | No | No | No | No | No | No | No | No | No | No | No | No | No | No | No | Yes | Yes | No | 4 |
| Team Bangladesh | No | No | No | Yes | No | No | Yes | Yes | No | No | No | No | No | No | No | No | No | No | No | No | No | No | No | Yes | No | Yes | 5 |
| Team Barbados | No | No | No | No | No | No | Yes | Yes | No | No | No | No | No | No | No | No | No | No | No | No | No | No | No | No | No | No | 2 |
| Team Belgium | No | Yes | No | No | No | Yes | Yes | Yes | Yes | Yes | Yes | No | No | No | No | No | No | No | No | No | No | No | No | Yes | Yes | No | 9 |
| Team Botswana | No | No | No | No | Yes | No | No | Yes | No | No | No | No | No | No | No | No | No | No | No | No | Yes | No | No | No | No | No | 3 |
| Team Brazil | No | No | No | Yes | Yes | Yes | Yes | Yes | Yes | No | No | No | No | No | Yes | Yes | No | No | No | No | Yes | Yes | No | No | No | Yes | 12 |
| Team Canada | No | No | No | Yes | Yes | No | No | No | No | No | Yes | No | No | No | No | No | No | No | No | No | No | No | No | No | No | No | 3 |
| (Cayman Islands) Team Cayman Isles | No | No | No | No | Yes | No | Yes | Yes | No | No | No | No | No | No | No | No | No | No | No | No | No | No | No | No | No | No | 3 |
| Team Chile | No | No | No | No | Yes | No | Yes | Yes | Yes | No | No | No | No | No | No | No | No | No | No | No | No | Yes | Yes | Yes | No | No | 7 |
| Team China | No | Yes | No | No | No | No | No | No | No | No | No | No | No | No | No | No | No | No | No | No | No | No | No | No | No | No | 1 |
| Team Chinese Taipei | Yes | Yes | No | No | No | Yes | Yes | No | No | No | No | No | No | No | Yes | No | No | No | No | No | Yes | No | No | Yes | Yes | Yes | 9 |
| Team Colombia | No | No | No | No | No | No | Yes | No | No | No | No | No | No | No | No | No | No | No | No | No | No | No | Yes | No | No | No | 2 |
| Team Costa Rica | No | No | No | No | No | No | No | No | No | No | No | No | No | No | No | No | No | No | No | No | Yes | Yes | Yes | No | No | No | 3 |
| Team Croatia | No | No | No | No | No | No | Yes | Yes | No | No | No | No | No | No | No | No | No | No | No | No | No | No | No | No | Yes | Yes | 4 |
| Team Czech Republic | No | No | No | Yes | Yes | Yes | Yes | Yes | No | No | Yes | No | No | No | No | No | No | Yes | Yes | Yes | Yes | Yes | No | Yes | No | Yes | 13 |
| Team Denmark | No | No | No | Yes | No | Yes | Yes | No | Yes | Yes | No | No | No | Yes | No | No | No | No | No | No | Yes | Yes | Yes | No | Yes | No | 10 |
| Team Dominican Republic | No | No | No | No | No | No | Yes | Yes | No | No | No | No | No | No | No | No | No | No | No | No | Yes | Yes | Yes | No | No | No | 5 |
| Team Ecuador | No | No | No | No | No | No | No | No | No | No | No | No | Yes | No | No | No | No | No | No | No | No | No | No | No | No | No | 1 |
| Team El Salvador | No | No | No | No | No | Yes | No | No | No | No | No | No | No | No | No | No | No | No | No | No | No | No | Yes | No | No | No | 2 |
| Team Estonia | No | No | No | No | No | Yes | Yes | Yes | Yes | Yes | Yes | No | No | No | No | No | No | No | No | No | No | Yes | Yes | Yes | Yes | Yes | 11 |
| Team Finland | No | No | No | No | No | No | Yes | No | Yes | No | Yes | No | No | No | No | No | No | No | No | No | No | No | No | No | No | No | 3 |
| Team France | Yes | No | No | Yes | No | No | Yes | Yes | Yes | Yes | Yes | No | No | No | No | No | No | No | No | No | No | No | No | No | No | No | 7 |
| (Georgia (country)) Team Georgia | No | No | Yes | No | No | Yes | Yes | Yes | No | No | No | No | No | Yes | No | No | Yes | No | No | No | Yes | Yes | Yes | Yes | Yes | Yes | 12 |
| Team Germany | Yes | Yes | Yes | Yes | No | Yes | Yes | Yes | Yes | Yes | Yes | Yes | No | No | Yes | No | Yes | Yes | No | No | Yes | Yes | Yes | Yes | Yes | Yes | 20 |
| (United Kingdom) Team Great Britain | Yes | Yes | Yes | Yes | Yes | Yes | Yes | Yes | No | No | No | Yes | No | No | No | No | No | Yes | Yes | Yes | No | Yes | Yes | Yes | No | Yes | 16 |
| Team Greece | No | No | No | No | Yes | Yes | No | Yes | Yes | Yes | No | No | No | No | No | Yes | No | No | No | No | Yes | Yes | No | No | No | No | 8 |
| Team Guatemala | No | No | No | No | No | No | No | Yes | No | No | No | No | No | No | No | No | No | No | No | No | No | No | No | No | No | No | 1 |
| Team Hong Kong | No | No | No | No | Yes | No | Yes | Yes | No | No | No | No | No | No | No | No | No | No | No | No | No | No | Yes | No | Yes | Yes | 6 |
| Team Hungary | No | No | No | No | No | Yes | Yes | No | No | No | No | No | No | No | No | No | No | No | No | No | Yes | No | Yes | Yes | Yes | Yes | 7 |
| Team Iceland | No | No | No | No | No | No | Yes | Yes | Yes | No | No | No | No | No | No | No | No | No | No | No | No | No | No | No | No | No | 3 |
| Team India | No | No | No | No | No | No | Yes | No | Yes | No | No | No | No | No | Yes | Yes | Yes | No | No | No | Yes | Yes | Yes | No | No | Yes | 9 |
| Team Indonesia | No | No | No | Yes | No | No | No | No | No | No | No | No | No | No | No | No | No | No | No | No | No | No | Yes | No | No | No | 2 |
| Team Israel | No | No | No | No | Yes | Yes | Yes | Yes | Yes | No | No | No | No | No | No | No | No | No | No | No | Yes | Yes | No | Yes | Yes | Yes | 10 |
| Team Italy | No | No | Yes | Yes | No | Yes | Yes | No | Yes | Yes | No | No | No | No | No | No | No | Yes | Yes | Yes | No | Yes | Yes | No | No | No | 11 |
| Team Japan | Yes | No | Yes | No | Yes | Yes | No | Yes | No | No | No | No | No | No | No | No | No | No | No | No | Yes | Yes | No | No | No | No | 7 |
| Team Kosovo | No | No | No | No | No | Yes | Yes | Yes | No | No | No | No | No | No | No | No | No | No | No | No | No | No | No | No | Yes | Yes | 5 |
| Team Kyrgyzstan | No | No | No | No | No | No | No | No | No | No | No | No | No | No | No | No | No | No | No | No | No | No | No | No | No | Yes | 1 |
| Team Latvia | No | No | No | No | No | Yes | No | Yes | No | Yes | Yes | No | No | No | No | No | No | No | No | No | No | No | No | No | No | Yes | 5 |
| Team Lebanon | No | No | Yes | No | No | Yes | No | No | No | No | No | No | No | No | No | No | No | No | No | No | Yes | No | No | No | No | No | 3 |
| Team Lithuania | Yes | Yes | No | No | No | Yes | Yes | Yes | No | Yes | No | Yes | No | No | No | Yes | No | No | No | No | Yes | Yes | Yes | Yes | Yes | Yes | 14 |
| Team Luxembourg | No | No | No | No | Yes | Yes | Yes | No | Yes | No | No | No | No | Yes | No | No | No | Yes | No | No | No | Yes | Yes | No | No | Yes | 9 |
| Team Malaysia | Yes | Yes | No | No | No | No | Yes | Yes | No | No | No | No | No | No | No | No | No | No | No | No | No | No | No | No | No | Yes | 5 |
| Team Malta | No | No | No | No | Yes | No | Yes | Yes | No | No | No | No | No | No | No | No | No | No | No | No | Yes | Yes | Yes | Yes | No | No | 7 |
| Team Mexico | No | No | No | No | No | No | Yes | Yes | No | No | No | Yes | No | No | No | No | No | No | No | No | Yes | Yes | Yes | Yes | No | No | 7 |
| Team Morocco | No | No | No | No | No | No | Yes | Yes | No | No | No | No | No | No | No | No | No | No | No | No | No | No | Yes | No | No | No | 3 |
| Team Mozambique | No | No | No | No | No | Yes | No | No | No | No | Yes | No | No | No | No | No | No | No | No | No | Yes | No | Yes | No | No | No | 4 |
| Team Namibia | No | No | No | No | No | No | Yes | No | No | No | No | No | No | No | No | No | No | No | No | No | No | No | No | No | No | No | 1 |
| Team Nepal | No | No | No | No | No | No | No | Yes | No | No | No | No | No | No | No | No | No | No | No | No | No | No | No | No | No | Yes | 2 |
| Team Netherlands | No | No | No | No | No | Yes | Yes | Yes | Yes | Yes | Yes | No | No | No | No | No | Yes | No | No | No | Yes | Yes | Yes | Yes | Yes | No | 12 |
| Team Nigeria | No | No | No | No | No | No | Yes | Yes | No | No | No | No | No | No | No | No | No | No | No | No | Yes | No | No | No | No | No | 3 |
| Team Norway | No | No | No | No | Yes | Yes | Yes | Yes | Yes | Yes | No | No | No | No | No | No | No | No | No | No | No | No | No | No | No | Yes | 7 |
| Team Peru | No | No | No | No | Yes | No | Yes | Yes | Yes | No | Yes | No | No | No | No | No | No | No | No | No | Yes | Yes | Yes | Yes | No | No | 9 |
| Team Philippines | No | No | No | No | No | No | No | No | No | No | No | No | No | No | No | No | No | No | No | No | Yes | Yes | No | No | No | No | 2 |
| Team Poland | No | No | No | No | Yes | Yes | No | No | Yes | Yes | No | No | No | No | No | No | No | No | No | No | Yes | Yes | Yes | Yes | Yes | Yes | 10 |
| Team Portugal | No | No | Yes | No | Yes | Yes | Yes | Yes | Yes | No | No | No | No | Yes | No | Yes | Yes | No | No | No | Yes | Yes | Yes | Yes | No | No | 13 |
| Team Qatar | Yes | No | No | Yes | Yes | No | No | Yes | No | No | No | No | Yes | No | No | No | No | No | No | No | No | No | Yes | No | No | No | 6 |
| Team Romania | No | No | No | No | No | No | No | No | No | No | No | No | No | No | No | No | No | No | No | No | Yes | No | No | No | No | No | 1 |
| Team Serbia | No | No | No | No | Yes | No | Yes | Yes | No | No | No | No | No | No | No | No | No | No | No | No | No | No | Yes | Yes | No | Yes | 6 |
| Team Singapore | No | No | No | No | No | No | Yes | Yes | No | No | No | No | No | No | No | No | No | No | No | No | No | No | No | No | No | No | 2 |
| Team Slovakia | No | No | No | No | Yes | No | Yes | Yes | Yes | No | No | No | No | No | Yes | Yes | Yes | No | No | No | No | Yes | Yes | Yes | Yes | Yes | 12 |
| Team South Africa | No | No | No | No | No | No | No | No | No | No | No | No | No | No | No | No | No | No | No | No | No | Yes | No | No | No | No | 1 |
| Team South Korea | No | No | No | No | No | No | Yes | Yes | No | No | No | No | No | No | No | No | No | No | No | No | Yes | No | Yes | No | No | Yes | 5 |
| Team Spain | Yes | Yes | Yes | Yes | Yes | Yes | Yes | Yes | Yes | Yes | Yes | Yes | Yes | Yes | Yes | Yes | Yes | Yes | Yes | Yes | Yes | Yes | Yes | Yes | Yes | Yes | 26 |
| Team Sri Lanka | No | No | No | No | Yes | No | Yes | No | No | No | No | No | No | No | No | No | No | No | No | No | No | Yes | No | No | No | No | 3 |
| Team Sweden | No | No | Yes | Yes | No | Yes | Yes | Yes | Yes | Yes | No | No | Yes | No | No | No | Yes | Yes | Yes | Yes | Yes | Yes | Yes | Yes | Yes | Yes | 18 |
| Team Switzerland | Yes | No | Yes | No | No | Yes | Yes | Yes | Yes | No | No | No | No | No | No | No | No | No | No | No | Yes | Yes | No | No | No | Yes | 9 |
| Team Trinidad and Tobago | No | No | No | No | No | No | No | No | No | No | No | No | No | No | No | No | No | No | No | No | Yes | Yes | No | No | No | No | 2 |
| Team Turkey | Yes | No | No | No | No | No | Yes | Yes | Yes | No | Yes | Yes | Yes | Yes | Yes | Yes | Yes | No | No | No | Yes | Yes | Yes | Yes | No | Yes | 16 |
| Team Ukraine | Yes | No | No | No | No | Yes | Yes | Yes | No | No | No | No | No | No | No | No | No | No | No | No | No | No | No | No | Yes | Yes | 6 |
| Team United Arab Emirates | No | Yes | No | No | No | Yes | Yes | Yes | No | No | No | No | No | No | No | No | No | No | No | No | No | No | Yes | Yes | No | No | 6 |
| Team United States of America | No | No | Yes | No | No | No | Yes | Yes | No | No | No | No | No | No | No | No | No | No | No | No | No | Yes | Yes | No | No | No | 5 |
| Team Uruguay | No | No | No | No | No | No | Yes | No | No | No | No | No | No | No | No | No | No | No | No | No | No | No | No | No | No | No | 1 |
| Team Uzbekistan | No | No | No | No | No | Yes | No | No | No | No | No | No | No | No | No | No | No | No | No | No | No | No | Yes | Yes | Yes | No | 4 |
| Team Venezuela | No | No | Yes | No | No | No | Yes | Yes | No | No | No | No | No | No | No | No | No | No | No | No | No | No | No | No | No | No | 3 |
| Team Vietnam | No | No | No | No | No | No | Yes | No | No | No | No | No | No | No | No | No | No | No | No | No | No | No | No | No | No | No | 1 |
| Team | GT Relay | GT Sprint | GT Single Make | Touring Car | Formula 4 | Drifting | Esports F4 | Esports GT | Crosscar Sr | Crosscar Jr | Crosscar Mini | Rally2 | | | Rally4 | | | RallyH | | | Karting Sprint Sr | Karting Sprint Jr | Karting Sprint Mini | Karting Endurance | Karting Slalom | Auto Slalom | Total |
| Team | GT Relay | GT Sprint | GT Single Make | Touring Car | Formula 4 | Drifting | Esports F4 | Esports GT | Crosscar Sr | Crosscar Jr | Crosscar Mini | R | G | T | R | G | T | R | G | T | Karting Sprint Sr | Karting Sprint Jr | Karting Sprint Mini | Karting Endurance | Karting Slalom | Auto Slalom | Total |
| Total | 2 | 4 | 1 | 8 | 10 | 6 | 16 | 17 | 3 | 2 | 3 | 0 | 0 | 0 | 2 | 2 | 0 | 1 | 1 | 1 | 11 | 11 | 6 | 8 | 5 | 8 | Total |

== Participating National Motorsport Committees ==
Participating National Motorsport Committees
- Albania (7)
- Andorra (5)
- Angola (1)
- Antigua and Barbuda (1)
- Argentina (11)
- Armenia (5)
- Australia (8)
- Austria (3)
- Azerbaijan (1)
- Bahamas (7)
- Bangladesh (8)
- Barbados (1)
- Belgium (12)
- Botswana (3)
- Brazil (13)
- Canada (3)
- Cayman Islands (3)
- Chile (9)
- China (2)
- Chinese Taipei (14)
- Colombia (2)
- Costa Rica (3)
- Croatia (3)
- Czech Republic (15)
- Denmark (12)
- Dominican Republic (5)
- Ecuador (2)
- El Salvador (2)
- Estonia (15)
- Finland (3)
- France (8)
- Georgia (18)
- Germany (29)
- Great Britain (24)
- Greece (9)
- Guatemala (1)
- Hong Kong (9)
- Hungary (11)
- Iceland (3)
- India (9)
- Indonesia (2)
- Israel (14)
- Italy (10)
- Japan (8)
- Kosovo (7)
- Kyrgyzstan (2)
- Latvia (6)
- Lebanon (3)
- Lithuania (21)
- Luxembourg (1)
- Malaysia (7)
- Malta (9)
- Mexico (8)
- Morocco (3)
- Mozambique (4)
- Namibia (1)
- Nepal (3)
- Netherlands (16)
- Nigeria (3)
- Norway (8)
- Peru (11)
- Philippines (2)
- Poland (14)
- Portugal (18)
- Qatar (8)
- Romania (1)
- Serbia (9)
- Singapore (2)
- Slovakia (12)
- South Africa (1)
- South Korea (5)
- Spain (32) (host)
- Sri Lanka (3)
- Sweden (27)
- Switzerland (11)
- Trinidad and Tobago (2)
- Turkey (15)
- Ukraine (9)
- United Arab Emirates (8)
- United States (5)
- Uruguay (1)
- Uzbekistan (7)
- Uruguay (1)
- Venezuela (3)
- Vietnam (1)

== Medal table ==
* Host nation (Spain)

2024 FIA Motorsport Games medal table
| Rank | Nation | Gold | Silver | Bronze | Total |
|---|---|---|---|---|---|
| 1 | Spain (ESP)* | 6 | 6 | 6 | 18 |
| 2 | Germany (GER) | 3 | 2 | 2 | 7 |
| 3 | Italy (ITA) | 3 | 0 | 0 | 3 |
| 4 | Great Britain (GBR) | 2 | 3 | 2 | 7 |
| 5 | Turkey (TUR) | 2 | 3 | 0 | 5 |
| 6 | Brazil (BRA) | 2 | 1 | 2 | 5 |
| 7 | Belgium (BEL) | 2 | 0 | 0 | 2 |
| 8 | Slovakia (SVK) | 1 | 1 | 0 | 2 |
| 9 | France (FRA) | 1 | 0 | 1 | 2 |
| 9 | Lithuania (LTU) | 1 | 0 | 1 | 2 |
| 11 | Argentina (ARG) | 1 | 0 | 0 | 1 |
| 11 | Poland (POL) | 1 | 0 | 0 | 1 |
| 11 | Portugal (POR) | 1 | 0 | 0 | 1 |
| 14 | Netherlands (NED) | 0 | 2 | 1 | 3 |
| 15 | Estonia (EST) | 0 | 2 | 0 | 2 |
| 16 | Czech Republic (CZE) | 0 | 1 | 3 | 4 |
| 17 | Switzerland (SUI) | 0 | 1 | 1 | 2 |
| 18 | Andorra (AND) | 0 | 1 | 0 | 1 |
| 18 | Hungary (HUN) | 0 | 1 | 0 | 1 |
| 18 | Norway (NOR) | 0 | 1 | 0 | 1 |
| 18 | Peru (PER) | 0 | 1 | 0 | 1 |
| 22 | Sweden (SWE) | 0 | 0 | 3 | 3 |
| 23 | Canada (CAN) | 0 | 0 | 1 | 1 |
| 23 | Denmark (DEN) | 0 | 0 | 1 | 1 |
| 23 | Mexico (MEX) | 0 | 0 | 1 | 1 |
| 23 | South Korea (KOR) | 0 | 0 | 1 | 1 |
| Totals (26 entries) | | 26 | 26 | 26 | 78 |

| Preceded by Marseille; France | FIA Motorsport Games; Valencia; Spain; III Motorsport Olympiad (2024) | Succeeded by TBA; TBA |
