= Aleš Burger =

Czech entrepreneur

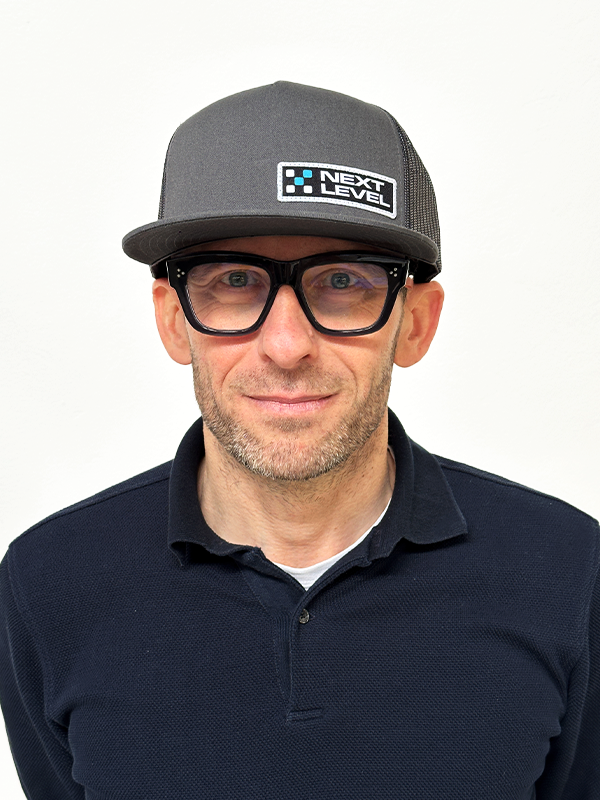
- Burger in 2024
- Born: 27 February 1974 (age 52); Teplice, Czechoslovakia
- Occupations: entrepreneur, event producer

Aleš Burger
Medal record
Karting
Representing Czech Republic
FIA Motorsport Games
Bronze medal – third place	2022 France	Karting Endurance Cup

Aleš Burger (born 27 February 1974) is a Czech entrepreneur and event producer.

In 2022, Burger won a bronze medal at the FIA Motorsport Games.

== Early life and education ==
Aleš Burger was born on born 27 February 1974 in Teplice. He graduated from the Secondary Technical School in Teplice in 1991.

== Career ==
Burger began his career as an event producer and booking agent at the K.N.A.K. alternative culture club in Teplice from 1992 to 1996. During this time, he organized music and theatre performances.

From 1996 to 2006, Burger organized the Cosmic Trip Open Air Festival in Teplice.

In 2004, Burger founded NEXT LEVEL, an event agency based in Prague, which organizes events for brands such as Red Bull, BMW and Orlen, primarily in Central Europe.

In 2008, Burger co-founded Auto Outlet Luxury Imports in Prague, and Hithit.com, a crowdfunding platform, in 2012. In 2020, Hithit.com won the Zonky Innovation Awards.

Since 2015, Burger has been a lecturer at the Faculty of Business Administration of the Prague University of Economics and Business.

From 2014 to 2019, Burger served as the show producer for the Red Bull Air Race World Championship, overseeing events in the US, Japan, UAE, and Europe.

In 2022, Burger founded NEXT LEVEL SLOVAKIA in Bratislava, Slovakia.

== Personal life ==
Burger has competed as a go-kart racer, winning the Karting Cup National Championship in 2014 and earning a bronze medal at the FIA Motorsport Games in 2022.
