= Jakub Przygoński =

Polish racing driver

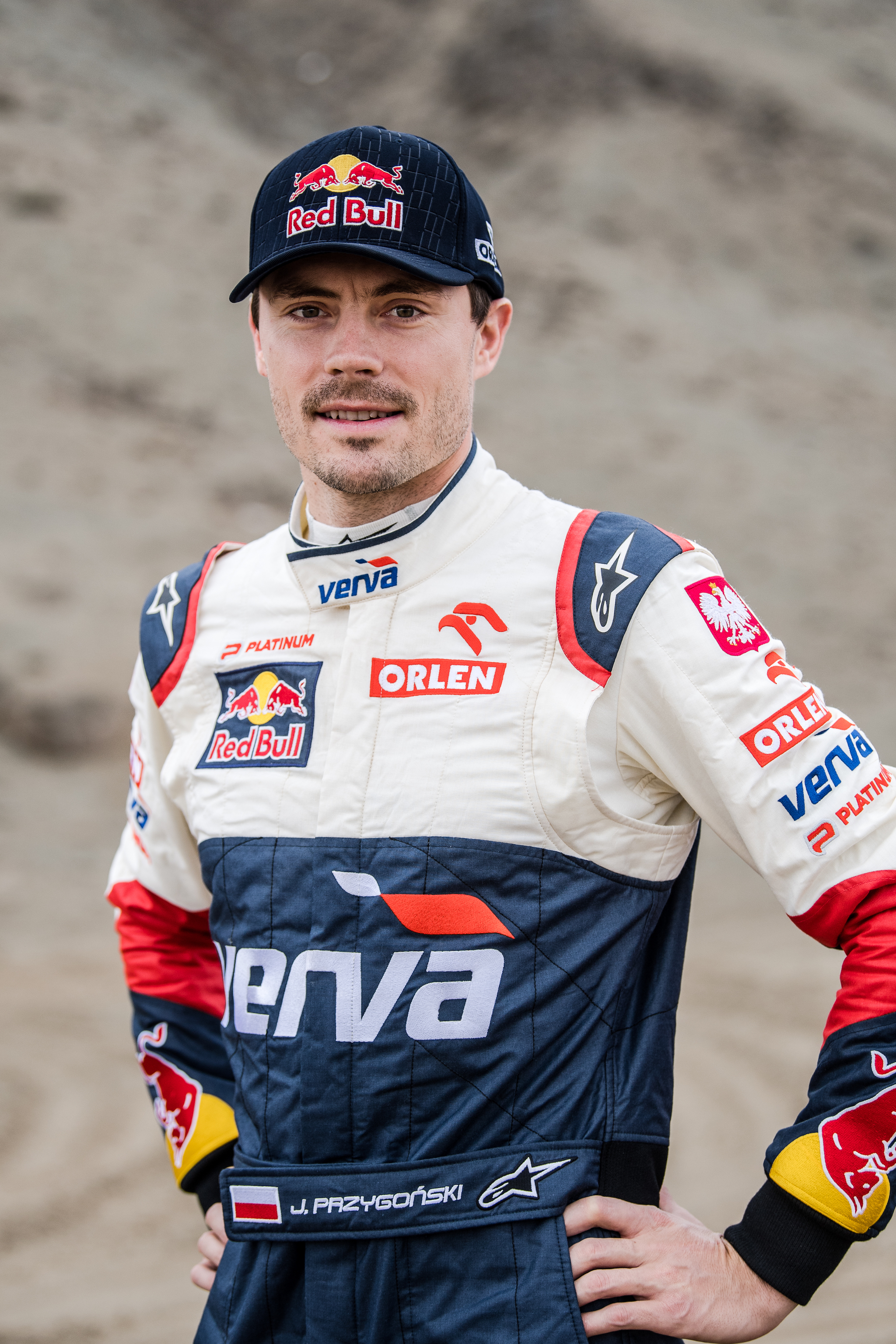
- Nationality: Polish
- Born: 24 March 1985 (age 41) Warsaw, Poland

Championship titles
- 2018: FIA World Cup for Cross-Country Rallies
Medal record
Drifting
Representing Poland
FIA Motorsport Games
Gold medal – first place	2024 Valencia	Drifting Cup
Bronze medal – third place	2022 Marseille	Drifting Cup

Jakub Przygoński (born 24 March 1985) is a Polish racing driver. As a rally raid driver, he won the FIA World Cup for Cross-Country Rallies in 2018. In addition to racing in rally raids, he has raced in other disciplines, especially motorcycling, such as motocross and enduro. He has also competed in drifting competitions, having won the bronze medal at 2022 FIA Motorsport Games in drifting.
