= Vanthoor =

Vanthoor, Van Thoor is a Dutch surname. Notable people with the surname include:

- Dries Vanthoor (born 1998), Belgian racing driver, brother of Laurens
- Laurens Vanthoor (born 1991), Belgian racing driver
