= Dries Vanthoor =

Belgian racing driver (born 1998)

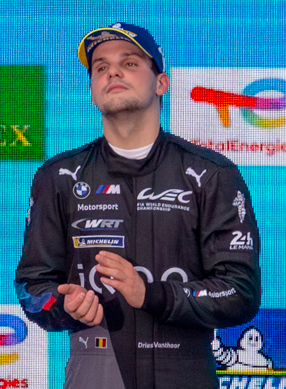
- Vanthoor on the podium at the 2024 6 Hours of Fuji
- Nationality: Belgian
- Born: 20 April 1998 (age 28) Heusden-Zolder, Limburg
- Relatives: Laurens Vanthoor (brother)

GT World Challenge Europe Endurance Cup
- Categorisation: FIA Silver (until 2017); FIA Gold (2018–2021); FIA Platinum (2022–)
- Years active: 2016–2021
- Teams: Belgian Audi Club Team WRT
- Starts: 32
- Wins: 2
- Poles: 2
- Fastest laps: 1
- Best finish: 3rd in 2021

Championship titles
- 2020-2022 2021: GT World Challenge Europe Sprint Cup; GT World Challenge Europe
Medal record
GT3
Representing Belgium
FIA Motorsport Games
Bronze medal – third place	2022 Le Castellet	GT Sprint

Dries Vanthoor (born 20 April 1998 in Heusden-Zolder) is a Belgian racing driver who competes in the FIA World Endurance Championship and the IMSA SportsCar Championship for BMW M Team WRT. In his previous role as an Audi factory driver, Vanthoor amassed multiple accolades, winning the Bathurst 12 Hour in 2018, the Nürburgring 24 Hours in 2019 and 2022, and taking three consecutive GT World Challenge Europe Sprint Cup titles from 2020 to 2022 alongside Charles Weerts.

Dries is the younger brother of Laurens Vanthoor, a Porsche and McLaren factory driver.

== Early career ==
Vanthoor began his career in karting, a discipline he remained in until 2014. In 2015, he stepped up to junior formula, driving in the Formula Renault 2.0 Northern European Cup as part of Josef Kaufmann Racing. With a win at Assen and a third place at the Nürburgring, Vanthoor ended up sixth in the standings.

== GT career (2016–2023) ==
=== 2016 ===
For the 2016 season, Vanthoor switched to sportscar racing, where he would perform double duties in the Blancpain GT Series Endurance Cup and GT Series Sprint Cup for Team WRT, partnering Frédéric Vervisch in both series and being joined by brother Laurens Vanthoor in the former championship. During the year, the rookie scored two podiums in the Endurance Cup, leading to an eighth place overall. This included a second place at Silverstone, where Vanthoor briefly took the lead from Rolf Ineichen before being passed by eventual winner Jazeman Jaafar a lap later. The Sprint Cup season began with difficulties, as Vanthoor caused a collision with Maxime Soulet in the season-opening Misano main race. That weekend's qualifying race also heralded the best result of his campaign, a fourth place; he and Vervisch finished 18th overall. In May, Vanthoor took part in the 24 Hours of Nürburgring, which he won whilst driving with Bonk Motorsport in the Cup 5 class. Finally, Vanthoor made his prototype racing debut at the 4 Hours of Spa in the ELMS, finishing second alongside his brother and Will Stevens.

=== 2017 ===
The following year, Vanthoor continued with the Belgian team in both categories. In the Endurance Cup, he and Marcel Fässler experienced an unlucky season, retiring from four of the five events. Their Sprint Cup campaign meanwhile, highlighted by a pair of victories at the Hungaroring and another podium in Germany, led to the pair becoming a fixture in the championship battle. However, a pit stop issue during the final race cost Vanthoor and Fässler any chances of the title, and they ended up fifth in the standings. It was the 24 Hours of Le Mans which brought glory to Vanthoor that season: he first set a lap record for the LMGTE Am class in qualifying, before winning the race in dominant fashion alongside Endurance Cup teammate Will Stevens and amateur driver Rob Smith.

After the season concluded, Audi Sport announced that Vanthoor would become a factory driver from 2018 onwards.

=== 2018 ===
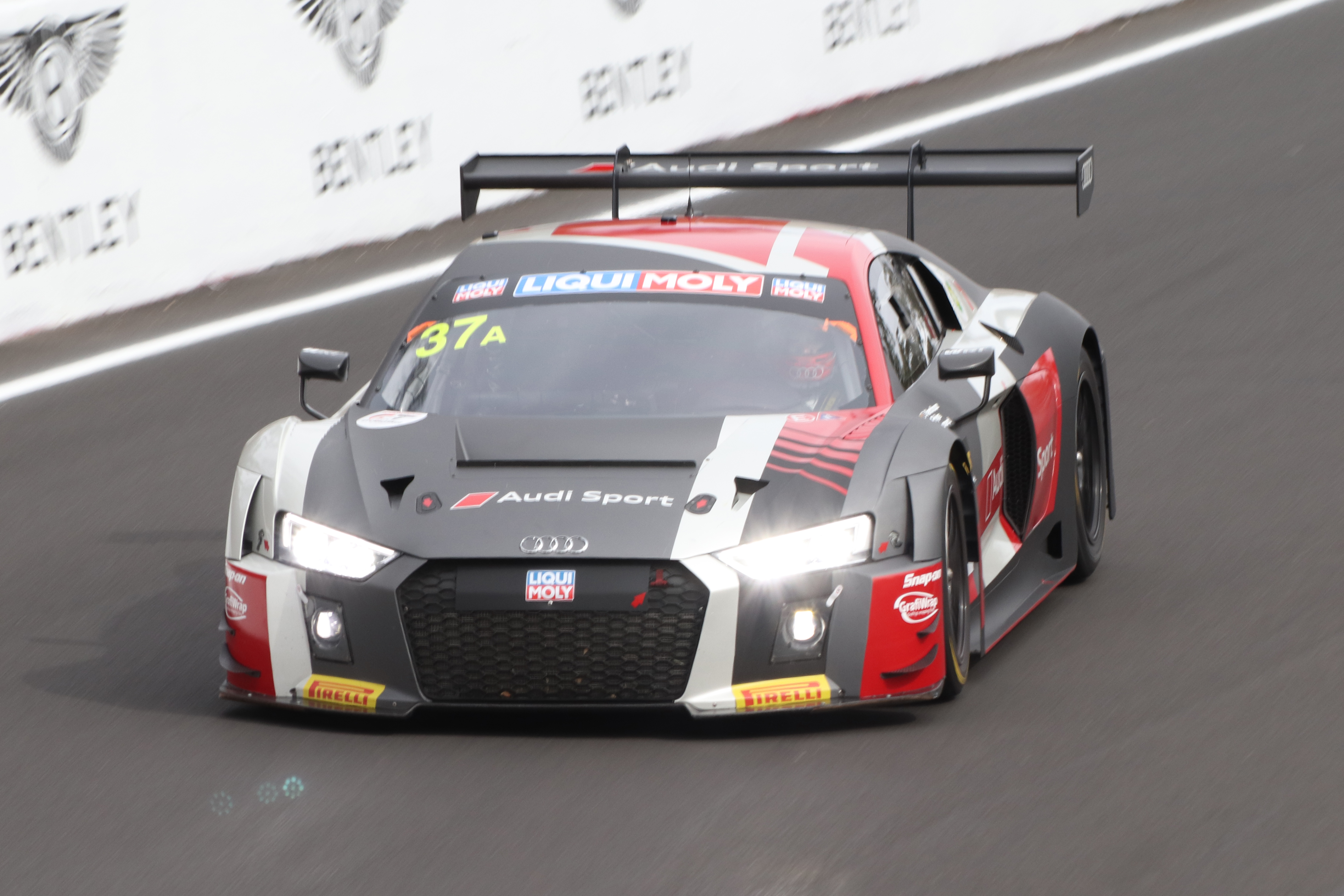
The race and Class APP-winning Audi R8 LMS of Robin Frijns, Stuart Leonard and Vanthoor.

At the beginning of 2018, Vanthoor claimed honours at the Bathurst 12 Hours, winning alongside Robin Frijns and Stuart Leonard in the red-flagged race.

Another year of double duties came that season, as Vanthoor partnered Stevens in the Sprint Cup, meanwhile his Endurance Cup teammates would be Christopher Mies and Alex Riberas. The latter campaign began with a bang; the trio coming out victorious at Monza after Vanthoor overtook Christian Engelhart and Maximilian Götz during the final hour. However, the squad ended up finishing seventh after they failed to score any further podiums that year.

The Sprint Cup season started with second place at Zolder, with Vanthoor losing the lead after being stuck in traffic on his in-lap. During the second Zolder race, Vanthoor used the pit stop phase to briefly take the lead, before he was given a drive-through penalty for an improper pit exit. At Brands Hatch, Vanthoor took pole and won ahead of the sister car in race 1, though he had to retire from race 2 with a rear wheel issue. A further blow to the team's title chances occurred in Misano, where Stevens had to make an unscheduled stop to fix a loose wheel nut. Race 2 in Misano yielded a second place, as did race 1 at the Nürburgring. Vanthoor and Stevens therefore ended the campaign fourth in points.

Vanthoor also competed in the ADAC GT Masters that season, though he and Florian Spengler were unable to surpass a season-best eighth-placed race finish with the newly formed EFP by TECE team.

=== 2019 ===
Audi and WRT remained Vanthoor's partners for the 2019 season, where he would compete in the Endurance and Sprint series, as well as racing for Montaplast by Land-Motorsport in the GT Masters. The Belgian took three wins during the season: one in the ADAC GT Masters at Zandvoort alongside Ricardo Feller, another during the Sprint Cup round at Misano where he partnered Charles Weerts, and an overall victory at the Nürburgring 24 Hours, one Vanthoor and teammates Pierre Kaffer, Frank Stippler, and Fréd Vervisch achieved with Team Phoenix.

=== 2020 ===
During a year heavily affected by the COVID-19 pandemic, Vanthoor partnered Charles Weerts in the youngster's sophomore season of sportscar racing. The pair proved to be a fruitful one in the newly rebranded GT World Challenge Europe Sprint Cup, where they won the championship after winning two races and achieving three further podiums. They also drove in the GT World Challenge Europe Endurance Cup, where two fourth places came to be their highest results.

In addition, Vanthoor returned to the ADAC GT Masters with WRT, where he and Weerts won at the season-opening Lausitzring round, leading from start to finish after Vanthoor had scored his first pole position in the category.

=== 2021 ===
In 2021, Vanthoor and Weerts, who had gained Audi factory driver status over the winter, returned to contest a double campaign in the Endurance and Sprint cups. A dominant title defense in the Sprint Cup followed, as the Belgians won the title with one event to spare, having taken four wins including a weekend sweep at Misano. Their Endurance Cup season saw Vanthoor and Weerts embroiled in a four-way championship battle, with the duo scoring second places at Le Castellet, where Vanthoor passed Marco Mapelli on the final lap, and the 24 Hours of Spa, a race in which Vanthoor narrowly lost out on victory to Ferrari factory driver Alessandro Pier Guidi. WRT ended up third overall in the standings, as a podium in Barcelona was not enough to overhaul the Iron Lynx squad which finished four points ahead.

=== 2022 ===
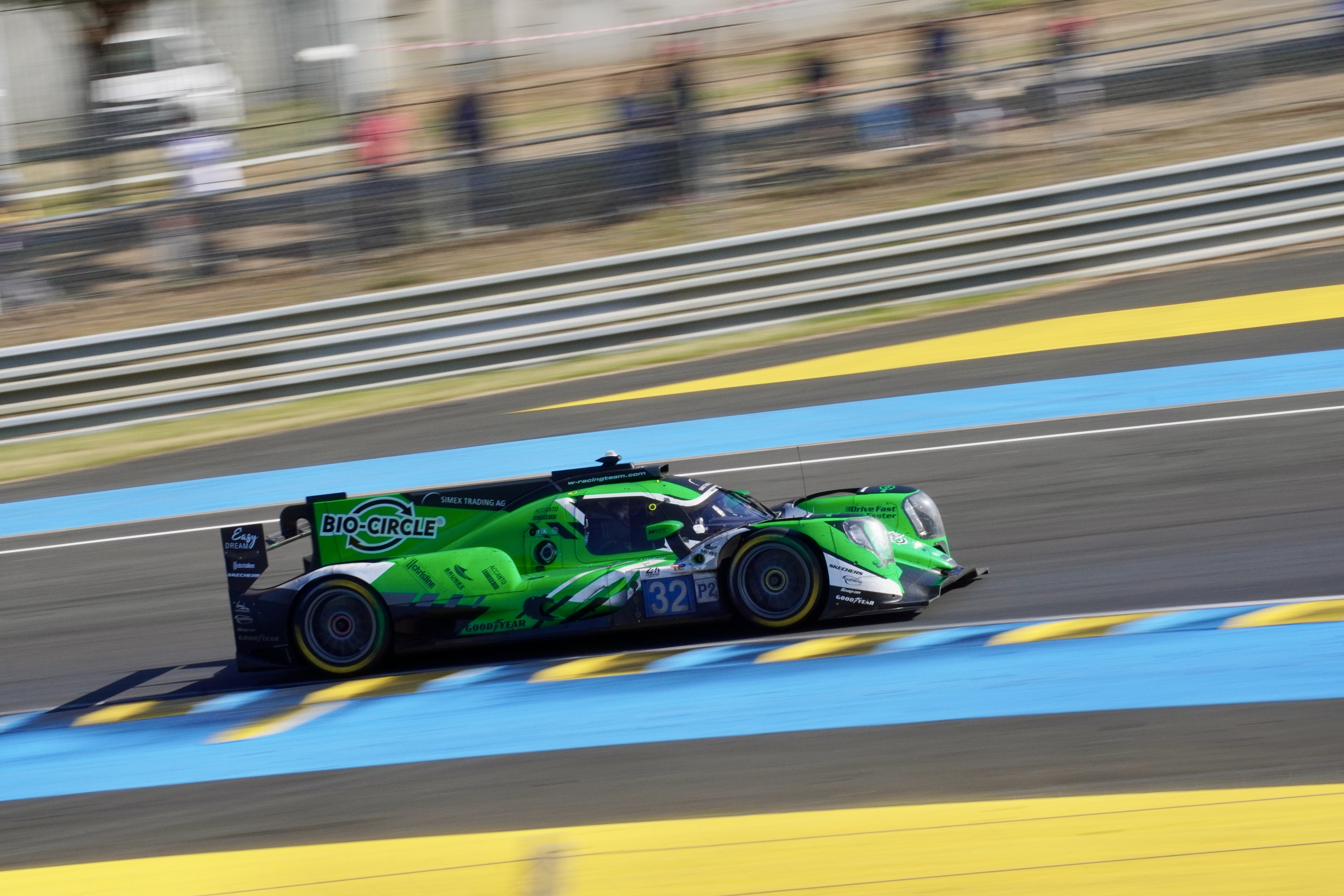
The #32 Oreca 07 from Team WRT at the 2022 24 Hours of Le Mans driven by Vanthoor, Mirko Bortolotti & Rolf Ineichen

Going into 2022, the Vanthoor-WRT partnership remained in the Endurance and Sprint cups for a seventh successive season together, as he and Weerts attempted to defend their Sprint Cup championship again. The Sprint Cup campaign turned out to be their best yet: Vanthoor and Weerts won five of the ten races, took another double at Misano and only missed out on the podium once. The pair won the title at the final round in Valencia, becoming the most successful pairing in the series's history. In the Endurance Cup, less success would be found, as Vanthoor and Weerts finished eighth overall despite winning the opening round in Imola and scoring two pole positions.

Vanthoor also garnered a win at the 6 Hours of Fuji alongside Robin Frijns and Sean Gelael as part of WRT's LMP2 lineup, where he, replacing René Rast, had made his second start in an Oreca 07 prototype, having competed with the team's third Le Mans entry earlier in the year. In addition, Vanthoor won the 24 Hours of Nürburgring with Team Phoenix, having come out unscathed in a collision with his brother Laurens earlier in the race.

At the end of the season, both Vanthoor and Weerts left Audi, soon announcing their moves to the BMW factory lineup.

=== 2023 ===
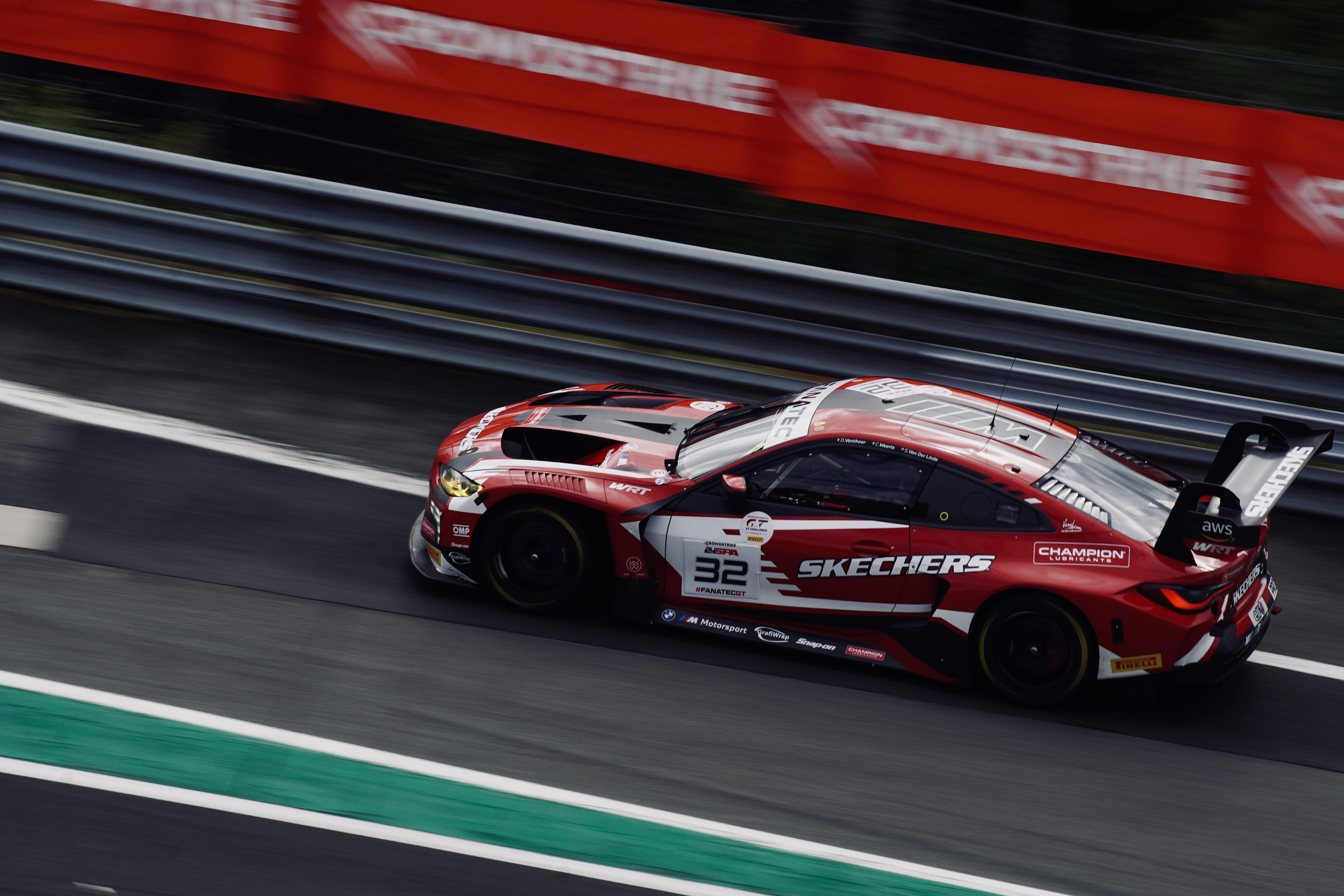
The #32 BMW M4 GT3 from Team WRT during the 2023 24 Hours of Spa

The 2023 season would be Vanthoor's first sportscar campaign without driving a GT3 variant of the Audi R8, as his and WRT's Endurance and Sprint cup campaigns would be contested with a BMW M4 GT3. Having defended his 2022 win of the Dubai 24 Hours at the start of the year, the Belgian entered the Sprint Cup together with Weerts and was joined by Sheldon van der Linde for the Endurance Cup. The latter played out in a disappointing manner, as retirements at Paul Ricard and Spa resulted in the trio placing eleventh by season's end. Vanthoor and Weerts would fare better in the Sprint Cup, where they won at Valencia and collected five further podiums to end the year third in points.

== Hypercar career (2024–present) ==
=== 2024 ===
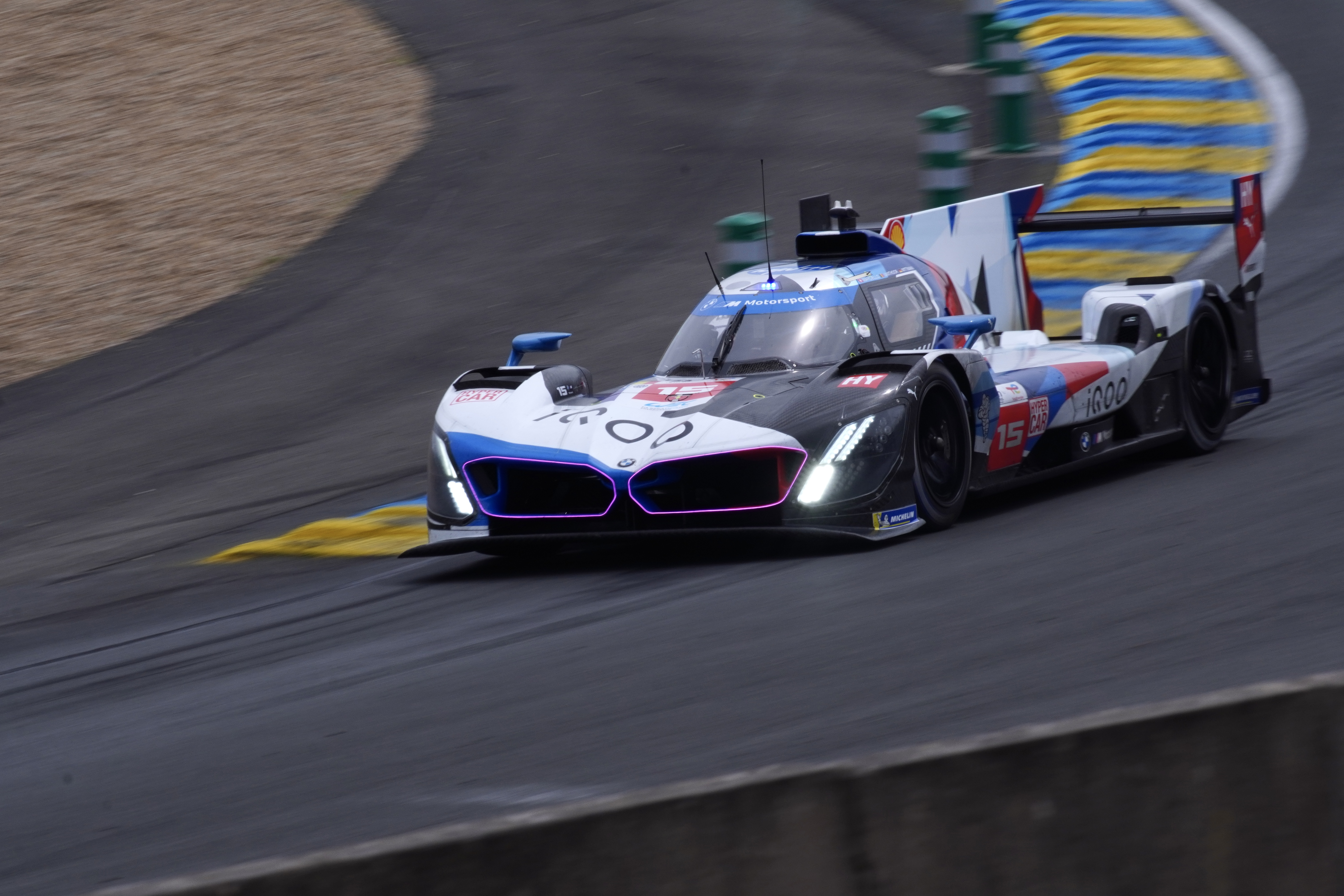
BMW M Hybrid V8 #15 during practice at the 2024 24 Hours of Le Mans

Ahead of the 2024 season, Vanthoor was confirmed to be joining the WRT-run BMW Hypercar programme, driving a BMW M Hybrid V8 in the FIA World Endurance Championship. Vanthoor shared driving duties in the No. 15 BMW M Hybrid V8 with Marco Wittmann and Raffaele Marciello. At the 2024 24 Hours of Le Mans, Vanthoor managed to put the BMW on pole of the regular qualifying session. He subsequently participated to the Hyperpole, which included the eight fastest cars from qualifying. Vanthoor crashed the car during the latter stages of the session, meaning the car would start in sixth position. During the race, the car was trying to climb back after an early setback when Vanthoor went off due to contact with the race leading Ferrari driven by Robert Kubica, which was later penalised for the contact.

At the 2024 6 Hours of Fuji, Vanthoor and teammates Marciello and Wittmann took the M Hybrid to its first podium in FIA WEC, finishing in second with the No. 15 after Vanthoor qualified in third with the car.

=== 2025 ===
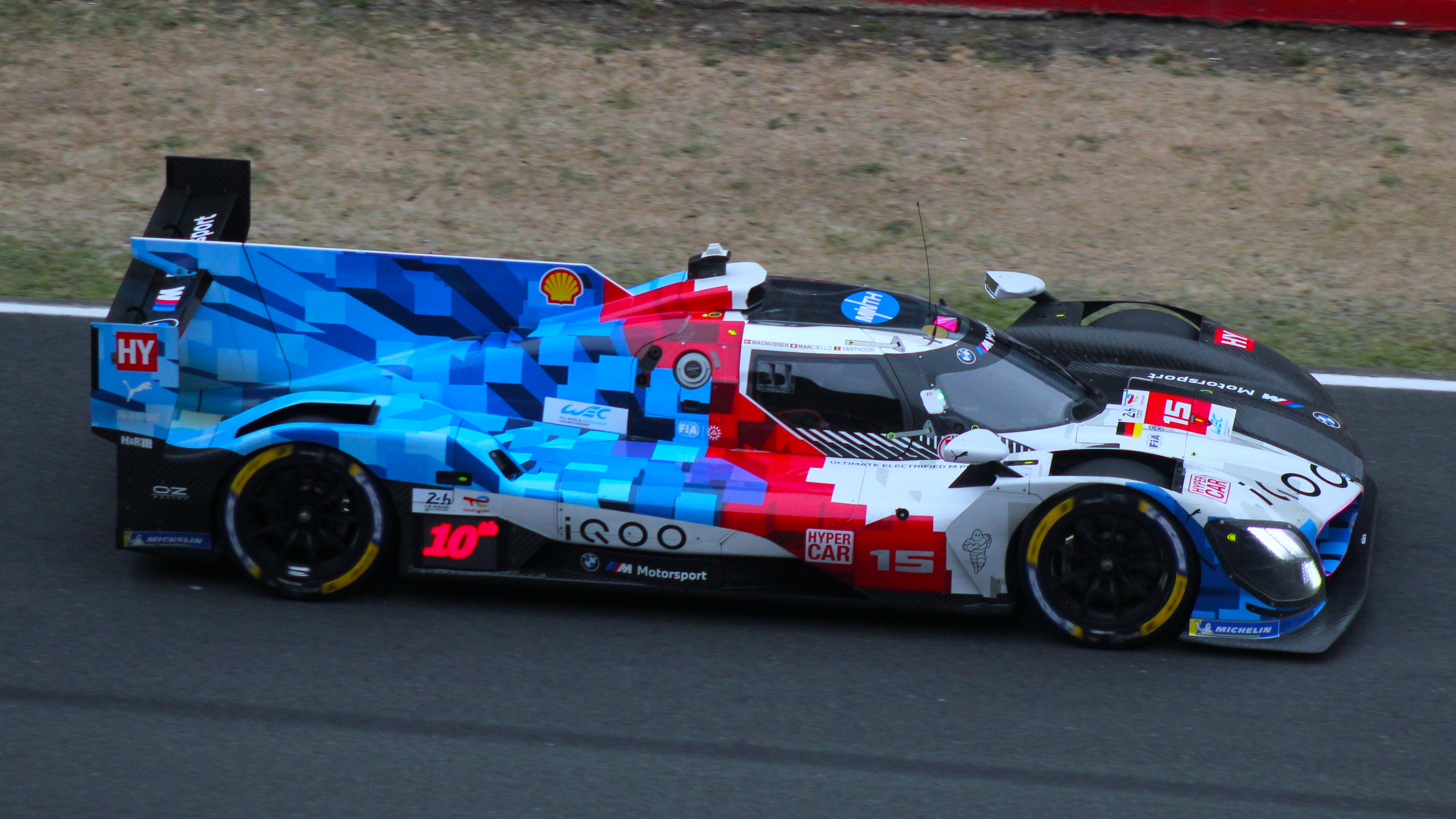
Vanthoor's No. 15 car at the 2025 24 Hours of Le Mans

At the 2025 24 Hours of Daytona, Vanthoor drove the M Hybrid to its first ever pole position, scoring the fastest lap in qualifying in the No. 24 car. The No. 24 crew, consisting of Vanthoor, Kevin Magnussen, Raffaele Marciello, and Philipp Eng, were front-runners throughout all stages of the endurance race and were in contention for the overall race win against both IMSA GTP entries from Porsche Penske Motorsport and Meyer Shank Racing's Acura ARX-06. At the final hour, the #24 experienced an issue with its nose which slowly deteriorated the car's condition by each passing lap. After attempting to stay out to remain in contention for the race win, Vanthoor was ultimately forced to pit for repairs as the car's condition worsened to a point in which the car could not continue further. This led to a fourth-place finish for him and his teammates.

== Other motorsports ==
=== Formula E ===
In May 2024, Vanthoor was invited to take part in the Formula E Berlin rookie test with Envision Racing.

== Racing record ==
=== Career summary ===
Season	Series	Team	Races	Wins	Poles	F/Laps	Podiums	Points	Position
2015	Formula Renault 2.0 NEC	Josef Kaufmann Racing	16	1	0	0	2	181	6th
2015	Eurocup Formula Renault 2.0	Josef Kaufmann Racing	2	0	0	0	0	0	NC†
2016	European Le Mans Series - LMP2	Team WRT	1	0	0	0	1	0	NC†
2016	Blancpain GT Series Endurance Cup	Belgian Audi Club Team WRT	5	0	0	1	2	45	8th
2016	Blancpain GT Series Sprint Cup	Belgian Audi Club Team WRT	10	0	0	0	0	12	18th
2016	Intercontinental GT Challenge	Audi Sport Team WRT	1	0	0	0	0	4	16th
2016	VLN Series - BMW M235i Cup		?	?	?	?	?	6	43rd
2016	24 Hours of Nürburgring - Cup 5	Bonk Motorsport	1	1	0	0	1	N/A	**1st**
2017	Blancpain GT Series Endurance Cup	Belgian Audi Club Team WRT	5	0	0	0	0	0	NC
2017	Blancpain GT Series Sprint Cup	Belgian Audi Club Team WRT	10	2	2	1	3	62	5th
2017	Audi R8 LMS Cup	Castrol Racing Team	2	1	2	0	2	42	9th
2017	China GT Championship - GT3	Kings	2	1	1	1	2	40	12th
2017	Intercontinental GT Challenge	Audi Sport Team WRT	1	0	0	0	0	0	NC
2017	24 Hours of Le Mans - LMGTE Am	JMW Motorsport	1	1	0	0	1	N/A	**1st**
2017	VLN Series - SP9	Montaplast by Land-Motorsport	1	1	0	0	1	0	NC†
2018	Blancpain GT Series Endurance Cup	Belgian Audi Club Team WRT	5	1	0	1	1	37	7th
2018	Blancpain GT Series Sprint Cup	Belgian Audi Club Team WRT	10	1	2	2	4	63.5	4th
2018	ADAC GT Masters	EFP by TECE	14	0	0	1	0	11	31st
2018	Intercontinental GT Challenge	Audi Sport Team WRT	4	1	0	1	2	55	5th
2018	VLN Series - SP9	Audi Sport Team WRT	1	0	0	0	0	0	NC†
2018	24 Hours of Nürburgring - SP9	Audi Sport Team WRT	1	0	0	0	0	N/A	DNF
2018	24H GT Series - A6	MS7 by WRT	1	0	0	0	0	0	NC†
2018	FIA GT World Cup	Audi Sport Team WRT Speedstar	2	0	0	0	0	N/A	8th
2018-19	Asian Le Mans Series - GT	Audi Sport Customer Racing Asia by TSRT	3	0	2	1	1	32	7th
2019	Blancpain GT Series Endurance Cup	Belgian Audi Club Team WRT	5	0	0	0	1	15	17th
2019	Blancpain GT Series Sprint Cup	Belgian Audi Club Team WRT	10	1	2	2	2	40	7th
2019	ADAC GT Masters	Montaplast by Land-Motorsport	12	1	0	0	3	113	6th
2019	IMSA SportsCar Championship - GTD	Montaplast by Land-Motorsport	1	0	0	0	0	9	69th
2019	Intercontinental GT Challenge	Audi Sport Team WRT	4	1	0	0	1	38	14th
2019	FIA GT World Cup	Audi Sport Team WRT	2	0	0	0	0	N/A	8th
2019	24H GT Series - A6	MS7 by WRT	1	0	0	0	1	0	NC†
2019	VLN Series - SP9	Audi Sport Team Land	1	0	0	0	0	5	68th
2019	24 Hours of Nürburgring - SP9	Audi Sport Team Phoenix	1	1	0	0	1	N/A	**1st**
2020	GT World Challenge Europe Endurance Cup	Belgian Audi Club Team WRT	4	0	0	1	0	39	8th
2020	GT World Challenge Europe Sprint Cup	Belgian Audi Club Team WRT	10	2	0	1	5	89	**1st**
2020	ADAC GT Masters	Team WRT	11	1	1	1	3	82	10th
2020	IMSA SportsCar Championship - GTD	WRT Speedstar Audi Sport	1	0	0	1	1	30	41st
2020	Intercontinental GT Challenge	Audi Sport Team Valvoline	1	0	0	0	0	4	19th
2020	Intercontinental GT Challenge	Audi Sport Team WRT	2	0	0	0	0	4	19th
2020	24H GT Series - GT3	MS7 by WRT	1	0	0	0	1	26	5th
2020	Nürburgring Langstrecken-Serie - SP9	Audi Sport Team Phoenix	2	0	0	0	0	3.25	84th
2020	24 Hours of Nürburgring - SP9	Audi Sport Team Phoenix	1	0	0	0	0	N/A	5th
2021	GT World Challenge Europe Endurance Cup	Belgian Audi Club Team WRT	5	0	0	0	3	79	**3rd**
2021	GT World Challenge Europe Sprint Cup	Belgian Audi Club Team WRT	10	4	2	2	7	103.5	**1st**
2021	ADAC GT Masters	Team WRT	14	1	1	1	1	79	12th
2021	24H GT Series - GT3	Team WRT	1	0	0	1	1	0	NC†
2021	Intercontinental GT Challenge	Audi Sport Team WRT	2	0	0	0	1	28	8th
2021	24 Hours of Le Mans - LMGTE Pro	HubAuto Racing	1	0	1	0	0	N/A	DNF
2021	Nürburgring Langstrecken-Serie - SP9 Pro-Am	Audi Sport Team Phoenix	1	0	0	0	0	0	NC†
2021	24 Hours of Nürburgring - SP9	Audi Sport Team Phoenix	1	0	0	0	0	N/A	DNF
2022	GT World Challenge Europe Endurance Cup	Belgian Audi Club Team WRT	5	1	2	0	1	39	9th
2022	GT World Challenge Europe Sprint Cup	Belgian Audi Club Team WRT	10	5	3	2	9	135.5	**1st**
2022	ADAC GT Masters	Montaplast by Land Motorsport	4	0	0	2	0	21	27th
2022	Intercontinental GT Challenge	Audi Sport Team WRT	1	0	0	0	0	0	NC
2022	FIA World Endurance Championship - LMP2	Team WRT	2	1	0	0	1	25	13th
2022	24 Hours of Le Mans - LMP2	Team WRT	1	0	0	0	0	N/A	11th
2022	24H GT Series - GT3	MS7 by WRT	1	1	1	0	1	0	NC†
2022	FIA Motorsport Games GT Sprint	Team Belgium	1	0	1	1	1	N/A	**3rd**
2022	24 Hours of Nürburgring - SP9	Audi Sport Team Phoenix	1	1	0	0	1	N/A	**1st**
2022-23	Middle East Trophy - GT3	MS7 by Team WRT	1	1	0	0	1	0	NC†
2023	GT World Challenge Europe Endurance Cup	Team WRT	5	0	0	0	0	26	11th
2023	GT World Challenge Europe Sprint Cup	Team WRT	10	1	1	1	6	86.5	**3rd**
2023	Intercontinental GT Challenge	Team WRT	5	2	0	2	3	80	**3rd**
2023	Deutsche Tourenwagen Masters	Schubert Motorsport	2	0	0	0	0	7	29th
2023	Nürburgring Endurance Series - SP9 Pro	Rowe Racing	2	1	0	0	1	0	NC†
2023	24 Hours of Nürburgring - SP9	Rowe Racing	1	0	0	0	1	N/A	**2nd**
2023	24 Hours of Le Mans - LMP2	Racing Team Turkey	1	0	0	0	0	N/A	DNF
2024	FIA World Endurance Championship - Hypercar	BMW M Team WRT	8	0	0	0	1	39	14th
2024	Intercontinental GT Challenge	BMW M Team WRT	3	2	0	0	2	50	**2nd**
2024	Intercontinental GT Challenge	Rowe Racing	1	0	0	0	0	50	**2nd**
2024	GT World Challenge Europe Endurance Cup	Team WRT	5	0	0	0	2	48	7th
2024	GT World Challenge Europe Sprint Cup	Team WRT	10	3	1	4	7	104.5	**2nd**
2024	GT World Challenge America - Pro	Team WRT	1	1	1	1	1	0	NC†
2024	FIA GT World Cup	Team WRT	1	0	0	0	0	N/A	DNF
2024	IMSA SportsCar Championship - GTP	BMW M Team RLL	1	0	0	0	0	253	32th
2024	Nürburgring Langstrecken-Serie - SP9	Rowe Racing	2	0	0	0	0	*	*
2024	24 Hours of Nürburgring - SP9	Rowe Racing	1	0	0	0	0	N/A	DNF
2024	British GT Championship - GT3	Century Motorsport	1	0	0	0	0	0	NC†
2025	FIA World Endurance Championship - Hypercar	BMW M Team WRT	7	0	0	0	0	26	21st
2025	IMSA SportsCar Championship - GTP	BMW M Team RLL	9	1	4	0	3	2679	4th
2025	GT World Challenge Europe Endurance Cup	Team WRT	1	0	0	0	0	4	25th
2026	IMSA SportsCar Championship - GTP	BMW M Team WRT	9	1	0	1	3	2650	6th
2026	FIA World Endurance Championship - Hypercar	BMW M Team WRT							
2026	GT World Challenge Europe Endurance Cup	Paradine Competition	2	0	0	0	0	0	NC
2026	24 Hours of Nürburgring - SP9	Rowe Racing	1	0	0	0	1	N/A	**3rd**

* Season still in progress † Guest driver ineligible to score points

=== Complete Formula Renault 2.0 Northern European Cup results ===
(key) (Races in bold indicate pole position) (Races in italics indicate fastest lap)

Year	Team	1	2	3	4	5	6	7	8	9	10	11	12	13	14	15	16	DC	Points
2015	Josef Kaufmann Racing	MNZ; 1; 6	MNZ; 2 Ret	SIL; 1; 17	SIL; 2; 9	RBR; 1; 7	RBR; 2; 10	RBR; 3 Ret	SPA; 1; 7	SPA; 2; 9	ASS; 1; 1	ASS; 2; 16	NÜR; 1; 10	NÜR; 2; 7	HOC; 1; 9	HOC; 2; 3	HOC; 3; 8	6th	181

=== Complete Eurocup Formula Renault 2.0 results ===
(key) (Races in bold indicate pole position; races in italics indicate fastest lap)

Year	Entrant	1	2	3	4	5	6	7	8	9	10	11	12	13	14	15	16	17	DC	Points
2015	Josef Kaufmann Racing	ALC; 1	ALC; 2	ALC; 3	SPA; 1	SPA; 2	HUN; 1	HUN; 2	SIL; 1	SIL; 2	SIL; 3	NÜR; 1; 19	NÜR; 2; 22	LMS; 1	LMS; 2	JER; 1	JER; 2	JER; 3	NC†	0

† As Vanthoor was a guest driver, he was ineligible for points

=== Complete GT World Challenge Europe results ===
==== GT World Challenge Europe Sprint Cup ====
(key) (Races in bold indicate pole position) (Races in italics indicate fastest lap)

Year	Team	Car	Class	1	2	3	4	5	6	7	8	9	10	Pos.	Points
2016	Belgian Audi Club Team WRT	Audi R8 LMS	Pro	MIS; QR; 4	MIS; CR; 22	BRH; QR; 6	BRH; CR; 12	NÜR; QR; 5	NÜR; CR; 34	HUN; QR; 11	HUN; CR; 7	CAT; QR; Ret	CAT; CR; 14	18th	12
2017	Belgian Audi Club Team WRT	Audi R8 LMS	Pro	MIS; QR; 9	MIS; CR; Ret	BRH; QR; 18	BRH; CR; 5	ZOL; QR; 13	ZOL; CR; 4	**HUN**; **QR**; 1	HUN; CR; 1	**NÜR**; **QR**; 3	NÜR; CR; 10	5th	62
2018	Belgian Audi Club Team WRT	Audi R8 LMS	Pro	**ZOL**; **1**; 2	ZOL; 2; 11	**BRH**; **1**; 1	BRH; 2 Ret	MIS; 1 Ret	MIS; 2; 2	HUN; 1; 5	HUN; 2; 7	NÜR; 1; 2	NÜR; 2 Ret	4th	63.5
2019	Belgian Audi Club Team WRT	Audi R8 LMS Evo	Pro	BRH; 1; 11	BRH; 2 Ret	**MIS**; **1** Ret	MIS; 2; 1	**ZAN**; **1**; 5	ZAN; 2; 3	NÜR; 1; 5	**NÜR**; **2**; 27	HUN; 1; 17	HUN; 2; 16	7th	40
2020	Belgian Audi Club Team WRT	Audi R8 LMS Evo	Pro	MIS; 1; 1	MIS; 2; 4	MIS; 3; 1	MAG; 1; 3	MAG; 2; 4	ZAN; 1; 12	ZAN; 2; 7	CAT; 1; 6	CAT; 2; 2	CAT; 3; 2	1st	89
2021	Team WRT	Audi R8 LMS Evo	Pro	**MAG**; **1**; 1	MAG; 2; 2	ZAN; 1; 8	ZAN; 2; 3	**MIS**; **1**; 1	MIS; 2; 1	BRH; 1; 1	BRH; 2; 2	VAL; 1; 16	VAL; 2 Ret	1st	103.5
2022	Team WRT	Audi R8 LMS Evo	Pro	BRH; 1; 2	BRH; 2; 2	MAG; 1; 1	MAG; 2; 6	**ZAN**; **1**; 1	ZAN; 2; 2	**MIS**; **1**; 1	**MIS**; **2**; 1	VAL; 1; 3	VAL; 2; 1	1st	135.5
2023	Team WRT	BMW M4 GT3	Pro	BRH; 1; 3	BRH; 2; 3	MIS; 1; 3	**MIS**; **2**; 9	HOC; 1; 3	HOC; 2; 5	VAL; 1; 5	VAL; 2; 1	ZAN; 1; 5	ZAN; 2; 2	3rd	86.5
2024	Team WRT	BMW M4 GT3	Pro	BRH; 1; 1	BRH; 2; 7	MIS; 1; 2	**MIS**; **2**; 1	HOC; 1; 2	HOC; 2; 2	MAG; 1; 1	MAG; 2; 2	CAT; 1; 9	CAT; 2; 7	2nd	104.5

==== GT World Challenge Europe Endurance Cup ====
Year	Team	Car	Class	1	2	3	4	5	6	7	Pos.	Points
2016	Belgian Audi Club Team WRT	Audi R8 LMS	Pro	MNZ; 9	SIL; 2	LEC; 19	SPA; 6H; 3	SPA; 12H; 35	SPA; 24H; 29	NÜR; 2	8th	45
2017	Belgian Audi Club Team WRT	Audi R8 LMS Evo	Pro	MNZ; Ret	SIL; Ret	LEC; Ret	SPA; 6H; 31	SPA; 12H; 19	SPA; 24H; 11	CAT; Ret	NC	0
2018	Belgian Audi Club Team WRT	Audi R8 LMS Evo	Pro	MNZ; 1	SIL; 4	LEC; Ret	SPA; 6H; 24	SPA; 12H; 15	SPA; 24H; 40	CAT; 15	7th	37
2019	Belgian Audi Club Team WRT	Audi R8 LMS Evo	Pro	MNZ; 18	SIL; 3	LEC; Ret	SPA; 6H; 17	SPA; 12H; 24	SPA; 24H; 25	CAT; 25	17th	15
2020	Belgian Audi Club Team WRT	Audi R8 LMS Evo	Pro	IMO; 4	NÜR; 5	SPA; 6H; 24	SPA; 12H; 49	SPA; 24H; Ret	LEC; 4		8th	39
2021	Team WRT	Audi R8 LMS Evo	Pro	MON; Ret	LEC; 2	SPA; 6H; 5	SPA; 12H; 2	SPA; 24H; 2	NÜR; 6	CAT; 3	3rd	79
2022	Team WRT	Audi R8 LMS Evo II	Pro	**IMO**; 1	LEC; 41	SPA; 6H; 14	SPA; 12H; 14	SPA; 24H; Ret	**HOC**; Ret	CAT; 4	9th	39
2023	Team WRT	BMW M4 GT3	Pro	MNZ; 6	LEC; Ret	SPA; 6H; 1	SPA; 12H; 52†	SPA; 24H; Ret	NÜR; 7	CAT; 11	11th	26
2024	Team WRT	BMW M4 GT3	Pro	LEC; Ret	SPA; 6H; 15	SPA; 12H; 16	SPA; 24H; 3	NÜR; 44†	MNZ; 2	JED; 4	7th	48
2025	Team WRT	BMW M4 GT3 Evo	Pro	LEC	MNZ	SPA; 6H; 25	SPA; 12H; 17	SPA; 24H; 8	NÜR	CAT	25th	4
2026	Paradine Competition	BMW M4 GT3 Evo	Bronze	LEC; 23	MNZ	SPA; 6H	SPA; 12H	SPA; 24H	NÜR; 36	ALG	16th	25

^{*} Season still in progress.

=== Complete Intercontinental GT Challenge results ===
Year	Manufacturer	Car	1	2	3	4	5	Pos.	Points
2016	Audi	Audi R8 LMS	BAT	SPA; 8	SEP			16th	4
2017	Audi	Audi R8 LMS Evo	BAT	SPA; 11	LAG			NC	0
2018	Audi	Audi R8 LMS Evo	BAT; 1	SPA; 13	SUZ; 4	LAG; 2		5th	55
2019	Audi	Audi R8 LMS Evo	BAT	LAG; 4	SPA; 15	SUZ; 1	KYA; 10	14th	38
2020	Audi	Audi R8 LMS Evo	BAT; Ret	IND	SPA; Ret	KYA; 8		19th	4
2021	Audi	Audi R8 LMS Evo	SPA; 2	IND; 5	KYA			9th	28
2022	Audi	Audi R8 LMS Evo II	BAT	SPA; Ret	IND	GUL		NC	0
2023	BMW	BMW M4 GT3	BAT; 4	KYA; 1	SPA; Ret	IND; 1	GUL; 2	3rd	80
2024	BMW	BMW M4 GT3	BAT; Ret	NÜR; Ret	SPA; 1	IND; 1		2nd	50
2025	BMW	BMW M4 GT3 Evo	BAT	NÜR	SPA; 6	SUZ	IND	27th	8

^{*} Season still in progress.

=== Complete 24 Hours of Spa results ===
Year	Team	Co-Drivers	Car	Class	Laps	Pos.	Class Pos.
2016	(Belgium) Belgian Audi Club Team WRT	(United Kingdom) Will Stevens (Belgium) Frédéric Vervisch	Audi R8 LMS	Pro Cup	514	29th	19th
2017	(Belgium) Belgian Audi Club Team WRT	(Switzerland) Marcel Fässler (Germany) André Lotterer	Audi R8 LMS	Pro Cup	541	11th	11th
2018	(Belgium) Audi Sport Team WRT	(Germany) Christopher Mies (Spain) Alex Riberas	Audi R8 LMS	Pro Cup	541	40th	21st
2019	(Belgium) Audi Sport Team WRT	(Spain) Alex Riberas (Germany) Frank Stippler	Audi R8 LMS	Pro Cup	358	25th	21st
2020	(Belgium) Belgian Audi Club Team WRT	(Germany) Christopher Mies (South Africa) Kelvin van der Linde	Audi R8 LMS Evo	Pro Cup	138	DNF	DNF
2021	(Belgium) Audi Sport Team WRT	(South Africa) Kelvin van der Linde (Belgium) Charles Weerts	Audi R8 LMS Evo	Pro Cup	556	**2nd**	**2nd**
2022	(Belgium) Audi Sport Team WRT	(South Africa) Kelvin van der Linde (Belgium) Charles Weerts	Audi R8 LMS Evo II	Pro Cup	293	DNF	DNF
2023	(Belgium) Team WRT	(South Africa) Sheldon van der Linde (Belgium) Charles Weerts	BMW M4 GT3	Pro Cup	250	DNF	DNF
2024	(Belgium) Team WRT	(South Africa) Sheldon van der Linde (Belgium) Charles Weerts	BMW M4 GT3	Pro Cup	478	3rd	3rd
2025	(Belgium) Team WRT	(South Africa) Sheldon van der Linde (Germany) Marco Wittmann	BMW M4 GT3 Evo	Pro Cup	548	8th	8th

=== Complete 24 Hours of Nürburgring results ===
Year	Team	Co-Drivers	Car	Class	Laps	Pos.	Class Pos.
2016	(Germany) Bonk Motorsport	(Germany) Emin Akata (Germany) Christopher Mies (Germany) Michael Schrey	BMW M235i Racing Cup	Cup 5	120	25th	**1st**
2018	(Belgium) Audi Sport Team WRT	(Netherlands) Robin Frijns (Germany) René Rast (South Africa) Kelvin van der Linde	Audi R8 LMS	SP9	36	DNF	DNF
2019	(Germany) Audi Sport Team Phoenix	(Germany) Pierre Kaffer (Germany) Frank Stippler (Belgium) Frédéric Vervisch	Audi R8 LMS Evo	SP9	157	**1st**	**1st**
2020	(Germany) Audi Sport Team Phoenix	(Switzerland) Nico Müller (Germany) Frank Stippler (Belgium) Frédéric Vervisch	Audi R8 LMS Evo	SP9 PRO	85	5th	5th
2021	(Germany) Audi Sport Team Phoenix	(Italy) Mattia Drudi (Netherlands) Robin Frijns (Germany) Frank Stippler	Audi R8 LMS Evo	SP9 PRO	17	DNF	DNF
2022	(Germany) Audi Sport Team Phoenix	(Netherlands) Robin Frijns (South Africa) Kelvin van der Linde (Belgium) Frédéric Vervisch	Audi R8 LMS Evo	SP9 PRO	159	**1st**	**1st**
2023	(Germany) ROWE Racing	(Belgium) Maxime Martin (South Africa) Sheldon van der Linde (Germany) Marco Wittmann	BMW M4 GT3	SP9 PRO	162	**2nd**	**2nd**
2024	(Germany) ROWE Racing	(Netherlands) Robin Frijns (South Africa) Sheldon van der Linde (Brazil) Augusto Farfus	BMW M4 GT3	SP9 PRO	21	DNF	DNF
2026	(Germany) ROWE Racing	(United Kingdom) Dan Harper (Germany) Max Hesse (South Africa) Sheldon van der Linde	BMW M4 GT3 Evo	SP9 PRO	156	**3rd**	**3rd**

=== Complete 24 Hours of Le Mans results ===
Year	Team	Co-Drivers	Car	Class	Laps	Pos.	Class Pos.
2017	(United Kingdom) JMW Motorsport	(United Kingdom) Robert Smith (United Kingdom) Will Stevens	Ferrari 488 GTE	GTE; Am	333	26th	**1st**
2021	(Chinese Taipei) Hub Auto Racing	(Portugal) Álvaro Parente (Belgium) Maxime Martin	Porsche 911 RSR-19	GTE; Pro	227	DNF	DNF
2022	(Belgium) Team WRT	(Italy) Mirko Bortolotti (Switzerland) Rolf Ineichen	Oreca 07-Gibson	LMP2	366	15th	11th
2023	Racing Team Turkey	(United Kingdom) Tom Gamble (Turkey) Salih Yoluç	Oreca 07-Gibson	LMP2	87	DNF	DNF
2023	Racing Team Turkey	(United Kingdom) Tom Gamble (Turkey) Salih Yoluç	Oreca 07-Gibson	LMP2 Pro-Am	87	DNF	DNF
2024	(Belgium) BMW M Team WRT	(Switzerland) Raffaele Marciello (Germany) Marco Wittmann	BMW M Hybrid V8	Hypercar	102	DNF	DNF
2025	(Germany) BMW M Team WRT	(Denmark) Kevin Magnussen (Switzerland) Raffaele Marciello	BMW M Hybrid V8	Hypercar	361	31st	18th
2026	(Germany) BMW M Team WRT	(Denmark) Kevin Magnussen (Switzerland) Raffaele Marciello	BMW M Hybrid V8	Hypercar	272	DNF	DNF

=== Bathurst 12 Hours results ===
Year	Team	Co-Drivers	Car	Class	Laps	Pos.	Class Pos.
2018	(Belgium) Team WRT	(Netherlands) Robin Frijns (United Kingdom) Stuart Leonard	Audi R8 LMS	GT3 - APP	271	**1st**	**1st**
2020	(Australia) Melbourne Performance Centre	(Belgium) Frédéric Vervisch (Germany) Christopher Haase	Audi R8 LMS Evo	A-GT3 Pro	148	DNF	
2023	(Belgium) Team WRT	(Belgium) Charles Weerts (South Africa) Sheldon van der Linde	BMW M4 GT3	A-GT3 Pro	323	4th	4th
2024	(Belgium) Team WRT	(Belgium) Charles Weerts (South Africa) Sheldon van der Linde	BMW M4 GT3	A-GT3 Pro	120	DNF	

=== Complete ADAC GT Masters results ===
(key) (Races in bold indicate pole position; results in italics indicate fastest lap)

Year	Team	Car	1	2	3	4	5	6	7	8	9	10	11	12	13	14	Pos.	Points
2018	EFP by TECE	Audi R8 LMS	OSC; 1; 20	OSC; 2; 9	MST; 1 Ret	MST; 2 Ret	RBR; 1; 14	RBR; 2; 12	NÜR; 1 Ret	NÜR; 2 Ret	ZAN; 1; 8	ZAN; 2; 10	SAC; 1; 20	SAC; 2; 18	HOC; 1; 8	HOC; 2 Ret	31st	11
2019	Montaplast by Land-Motorsport	Audi R8 LMS Evo	OSC; 1; 4	OSC; 2; 2	MST; 1; 15	MST; 2; 10	RBR; 1; 12	RBR; 2; 23	ZAN; 1; 11	ZAN; 2; 1	NÜR; 1; 8	NÜR; 2; 18	HOC; 1; 6	HOC; 2; 2	SAC; 1	SAC; 2	6th	113
2020	Team WRT	Audi R8 LMS Evo	LAU; 1; 20	**LAU**; **2**; 1	NÜR; 1 Ret	NÜR; 2; 2	HOC; 1; 14	HOC; 2 DSQ	SAC; 1; 11	SAC; 2; 2	RBR; 1 WD	RBR; 2 WD	LAU; 1; 23	LAU; 2; 26	OSC; 1; 15	OSC; 2; 7	10th	82
2021	Team WRT	Audi R8 LMS Evo	OSC; 1; 11	OSC; 2; 12	RBR; 1; 5	RBR; 2; 15	ZAN; 1; 5	**ZAN**; **2**; 1	LAU; 1 Ret	LAU; 2; 24	SAC; 1; 6	SAC; 2 Ret	HOC; 1; 23	HOC; 2 Ret	NÜR; 1; 10	NÜR; 2 Ret	12th	79
2022	Montaplast by Land Motorsport	Audi R8 LMS Evo II	OSC; 1	OSC; 2	RBR; 1; 7	RBR; 2; 5	ZAN; 1	ZAN; 2	NÜR; 1	NÜR; 2	LAU; 1	LAU; 2	SAC; 1; 17	SAC; 2 Ret	HOC; 1	HOC; 2	27th	21

=== Complete IMSA SportsCar Championship results ===
(key) (Races in bold indicate pole position; results in italics indicate fastest lap)

Year	Entrant	Class	Car	Engine	1	2	3	4	5	6	7	8	9	10	11	Rank	Points
2019	Montaplast by Land-Motorsport	GTD	Audi R8 LMS Evo	Audi DAR 5.2 L V10	DAY; 22	SEB	MDO	DET	WGL	MOS	LIM	ELK	VIR	LGA	PET	69th	12
2020	WRT Speedstar Audi Sport	GTD	Audi R8 LMS Evo	Audi DAR 5.2 L V10	DAY; 3	DAY	SEB	ELK	VIR	ATL	MDO	CLT	PET	LGA	SEB	41st	30
2024	BMW M Team RLL	GTP	BMW M Hybrid V8	BMW P66/3 4.0 L Turbo V8	DAY; 8	SEB	LBH	LGA	DET	WGL	ELK	IMS	PET			32nd	253
2025	BMW M Team RLL	GTP	BMW M Hybrid V8	BMW P66/3 4.0 L Turbo V8	**DAY**; 4	**SEB**; 12	**LBH**; 3	**LGA**; 3	DET; 5	WGL; 8	ELK; 1	IMS; 4	PET; 9			4th	2679
2026	BMW M Team WRT	GTP	BMW M Hybrid V8	BMW P66/3 4.0 L Turbo V8	DAY; 3	SEB; 5	LBH; 5	LGA; 9	DET; 9	WGL; 4	ELK; 11	IMS; 1	PET; 2			6th	2650

=== Complete FIA World Endurance Championship results ===
(key) (Races in bold indicate pole position) (Races in italics indicate fastest lap)

Year	Entrant	Class	Car	Engine	1	2	3	4	5	6	7	8	Rank	Points
2022	Team WRT	LMP2	Oreca 07	Gibson GK428 4.2 L V8	SEB	SPA	LMS; 11	MNZ	FUJ; 1	BHR			13th	25
2024	BMW M Team WRT	Hypercar	BMW M Hybrid V8	BMW P66/3 4.0 L Turbo V8	QAT; 14	IMO; DSQ	SPA; 11	LMS; Ret	SÃO; 9	COA; 8	FUJ; 2	BHR; 5	14th	39
2025	BMW M Team WRT	Hypercar	BMW M Hybrid V8	BMW P66/3 4.0 L Turbo V8	QAT; 4	IMO; 6	SPA	LMS; 17	SÃO; 17	COA; 12	FUJ; Ret	BHR; Ret	21st	26
2026	BMW M Team WRT	Hypercar	BMW M Hybrid V8	BMW P66/3 4.0 L Turbo V8	IMO	SPA; 2	LMS; Ret	SÃO; 1	COA; 8	FUJ; 3	CAT; 7	MNZ; 5	6th	79

=== Complete Deutsche Tourenwagen Masters results ===
(key) (Races in bold indicate pole position) (Races in italics indicate fastest lap)

Year	Entrant	Chassis	1	2	3	4	5	6	7	8	9	10	11	12	13	14	15	16	Rank	Points
2023	Schubert Motorsport	BMW M4 GT3	OSC; 1	OSC; 2	ZAN; 1; 9	ZAN; 2 Ret	NOR; 1	NOR; 2	NÜR; 1	NÜR; 2	LAU; 1	LAU; 2	SAC; 1	SAC; 2	RBR; 1	RBR; 2	HOC; 1	HOC; 2	29th	7

=== Complete 24 Hours of Zolder results ===
Year	Team	Co-Drivers	Car	Class	Laps	Pos.	Class Pos.
2017	(Belgium) MExT Racing	(Belgium) Lieven Goegebuer (Belgium) Xavier Stevens (Belgium) Koen Wauters (Belgium) Kris Wauters	Porsche 991 Cup	Belcar 1	795	5th	1st
2018	(Belgium) Independent Motorsport	(Germany) Christian Engelhart (Belgium) Lieven Goegebuer (Belgium) Niels Lagrange (Belgium) Xavier Stevens	Porsche 991 Cup	Belcar 1	806	1st	1st
2022	(Belgium) PK Carsport	(Belgium) Bert Longin (Belgium) Stienes Longin (Belgium) Peter Guelinckx (Belgium) Nicolas Saelens	Audi R8 LMS GT2	GTA	772	1st	1st

Sporting positions
Preceded by Craig Lowndes; Toni Vilander; Jamie Whincup	Winner of the Bathurst 12 Hour; 2018; With: Robin Frijns & Stuart Leonard	Succeeded by Matt Campbell; Dennis Olsen; Dirk Werner
