= 2022 FIA Motorsport Games Karting Endurance Cup =

Motorsport event

Race details
Date	26–30 October
Official name	FIA Motorsport Games Karting Endurance Cup
Location	Circuit Paul Ricard, France
Course	Circuit Paul Ricard / Karting Track; 0.964 km
Distance	Qualifying; 30 minutes Main Race; 4 hours
- Qualifying

Pole
Driver	(Spain) Alvaro Bajo Robles (Spain) Alba Cano Ramirez (Spain) José Manuel Pérez-Aicart (Spain) Ivan Velasco	Team Spain
Time	59.698
- Main Race

Fastest lap
Driver	(Peru) Maria Jesus Esquivel (Peru) Harold Watson (Peru) Mark Harten (Peru) Taylor Greenfield	Team Peru
Time	59.065

Medalists
1st place, gold medalist(s)	(Belgium) Maxime Drion (Belgium) Jeremy Peclers (Belgium) Sita Vanmeert (Belgium) Antoine Morlet	Team Belgium
2nd place, silver medalist(s)	(Spain) Alvaro Bajo Robles (Spain) Alba Cano Ramirez (Spain) José Manuel Pérez-Aicart (Spain) Ivan Velasco	Team Spain
3rd place, bronze medalist(s)	(Czech Republic) Ondřej Kočka (Czech Republic) Aleš Burger (Czech Republic) Ošťádal Zdeněk (Czech Republic) Soňa Ptáčková	Team Czech Republic

The 2022 FIA Motorsport Games Karting Endurance Cup is the first FIA Motorsport Games Karting Endurance Cup, held at Circuit Paul Ricard, France on 26 October to 30 October 2022. The race was contested with Tillotson T4 karts. A National driving license was necessary to be able to compete. The event was part of the 2022 FIA Motorsport Games.

== Entry list ==
Team	Kart	No.	Drivers
Team Chinese Taipei	IPK - TILLOTSON - MAXXIS	1	Yu-Hsuan Tsai
Team Chinese Taipei	IPK - TILLOTSON - MAXXIS	1	Chun-Yao Lo
Team Chinese Taipei	IPK - TILLOTSON - MAXXIS	1	Hsiao-Hsu Cheng
Team Chinese Taipei	IPK - TILLOTSON - MAXXIS	1	Chen-Yu Chung
Team Malta	IPK - TILLOTSON - MAXXIS	2	Ella Zammit
Team Malta	IPK - TILLOTSON - MAXXIS	2	Nicky Gauci
Team Malta	IPK - TILLOTSON - MAXXIS	2	Owen Mangion
Team Malta	IPK - TILLOTSON - MAXXIS	2	Kyle Mercieca
Team Hong Kong	IPK - TILLOTSON - MAXXIS	3	King Chi Wong
Team Hong Kong	IPK - TILLOTSON - MAXXIS	3	Man Cheong Ho
Team Hong Kong	IPK - TILLOTSON - MAXXIS	3	Tak Felix Yeung
Team Hong Kong	IPK - TILLOTSON - MAXXIS	3	Pui Yan Chung
Team Poland	IPK - TILLOTSON - MAXXIS	4	Kornelia Olkucka
Team Poland	IPK - TILLOTSON - MAXXIS	4	Jakub Rajski
Team Poland	IPK - TILLOTSON - MAXXIS	4	Marcel Kuc
Team Poland	IPK - TILLOTSON - MAXXIS	4	Adam Szydłowski
Team Portugal	IPK - TILLOTSON - MAXXIS	5	Sofia Correia
Team Portugal	IPK - TILLOTSON - MAXXIS	5	Mariana Machado
Team Portugal	IPK - TILLOTSON - MAXXIS	5	Rita Teixeira
Team Portugal	IPK - TILLOTSON - MAXXIS	5	Anastácia Khomyn
Team Belgium	IPK - TILLOTSON - MAXXIS	6	Maxime Drion
Team Belgium	IPK - TILLOTSON - MAXXIS	6	Jeremy Peclers
Team Belgium	IPK - TILLOTSON - MAXXIS	6	Sita Vanmeert
Team Belgium	IPK - TILLOTSON - MAXXIS	6	Antoine Morlet
Team Peru	IPK - TILLOTSON - MAXXIS	7	Maria Jesus Esquivel
Team Peru	IPK - TILLOTSON - MAXXIS	7	Harold Watson
Team Peru	IPK - TILLOTSON - MAXXIS	7	Mark Harten
Team Peru	IPK - TILLOTSON - MAXXIS	7	Taylor Greenfield
(Georgia (country)) Team Georgia	IPK - TILLOTSON - MAXXIS	8	Mariam Davitidze
(Georgia (country)) Team Georgia	IPK - TILLOTSON - MAXXIS	8	Mariam Tsiklauri
(Georgia (country)) Team Georgia	IPK - TILLOTSON - MAXXIS	8	Nika Kobosnidze
(Georgia (country)) Team Georgia	IPK - TILLOTSON - MAXXIS	8	Archil Tsimakuridze
(The Bahamas) Team Bahamas	IPK - TILLOTSON - MAXXIS	9	Ramando Hudson
(The Bahamas) Team Bahamas	IPK - TILLOTSON - MAXXIS	9	Christopher Bain
(The Bahamas) Team Bahamas	IPK - TILLOTSON - MAXXIS	9	Jashai Burrows
(The Bahamas) Team Bahamas	IPK - TILLOTSON - MAXXIS	9	Giselle Liriano
Team Uzbekistan	IPK - TILLOTSON - MAXXIS	10	Farukh Urunov
Team Uzbekistan	IPK - TILLOTSON - MAXXIS	10	Anastasiya Urunova
Team Uzbekistan	IPK - TILLOTSON - MAXXIS	10	Adhamjon Egamberdiev
Team Uzbekistan	IPK - TILLOTSON - MAXXIS	10	Islomjon Ismoilov
Team United Kingdom	IPK - TILLOTSON - MAXXIS	11	Jack O'Neil
Team United Kingdom	IPK - TILLOTSON - MAXXIS	11	Mike Philippou
Team United Kingdom	IPK - TILLOTSON - MAXXIS	11	Owen Jenman
Team United Kingdom	IPK - TILLOTSON - MAXXIS	11	Rhianna Kay Purcocks
Team United Arab Emirates	IPK - TILLOTSON - MAXXIS	12	Mariam Alhosani
Team United Arab Emirates	IPK - TILLOTSON - MAXXIS	12	Ahmad Alhamadi
Team United Arab Emirates	IPK - TILLOTSON - MAXXIS	12	Humaid Obaid Alketbi
Team United Arab Emirates	IPK - TILLOTSON - MAXXIS	12	Ahmad Nabil Alboom
Team Spain	IPK - TILLOTSON - MAXXIS	13	Alvaro Bajo Robles
Team Spain	IPK - TILLOTSON - MAXXIS	13	Alba Cano Ramirez
Team Spain	IPK - TILLOTSON - MAXXIS	13	José Manuel Pérez-Aicart
Team Spain	IPK - TILLOTSON - MAXXIS	13	Ivan Velasco
Team Czech Republic	IPK - TILLOTSON - MAXXIS	14	Ondřej Kočka
Team Czech Republic	IPK - TILLOTSON - MAXXIS	14	Aleš Burger
Team Czech Republic	IPK - TILLOTSON - MAXXIS	14	Ošťádal Zdeněk
Team Czech Republic	IPK - TILLOTSON - MAXXIS	14	Soňa Ptáčková
Team Israel	IPK - TILLOTSON - MAXXIS	15	Itzhak Shahar
Team Israel	IPK - TILLOTSON - MAXXIS	15	Yarden Oved
Team Israel	IPK - TILLOTSON - MAXXIS	15	Yaniv Hershkovitz
Team Israel	IPK - TILLOTSON - MAXXIS	15	Ran Ben Ezer
Team Slovakia	IPK - TILLOTSON - MAXXIS	16	Mátyás Koczó
Team Slovakia	IPK - TILLOTSON - MAXXIS	16	Imrich Szakál
Team Slovakia	IPK - TILLOTSON - MAXXIS	16	Juraj Mlčuch
Team Slovakia	IPK - TILLOTSON - MAXXIS	16	Dobrotová Veronika

== Qualifying ==
Pos	No.	Team	Time	Gap
1	13	Team Spain	59.698	—
2	14	Team Czech Republic	59.965	+ 0.267
3	11	Team United Kingdom	59.986	+ 0.288
4	2	Team Malta	1:00.138	+ 0.440
5	7	Team Peru	1:00.185	+ 0.487
6	4	Team Poland	1:00.270	+ 0.572
7	6	Team Belgium	1:00.343	+ 0.645
8	5	Team Portugal	1:00.465	+ 0.767
9	8	(Georgia (country)) Team Georgia	1:00.478	+ 0.780
10	12	Team United Arab Emirates	1:00.540	+ 0.843
11	16	Team Slovakia	1:00.826	+ 1.128
12	1	Team Chinese Taipei	1:00.958	+ 1.260
13	15	Team Israel	1:01.053	+ 1.355
14	10	Team Uzbekistan	1:01.754	+ 2.056
15	3	Team Hong Kong	1:01.806	+ 2.108
16	9	(The Bahamas) Team Bahamas	1:03.221	+ 3.523

== Main Race ==
Leaders:

No.	Team	Laps
13	Team Spain	1-46
11	Team United Kingdom	47–80
8	(Georgia (country)) Team Georgia	81–84
11	Team United Kingdom	85–109
13	Team Spain	110–127
6	Team Belgium	128–130
13	Team Spain	131–134
6	Team Belgium	135–140
13	Team Spain	141–149
6	Team Belgium	150–238

Race Results

Pos.	No.	Grid	Team	Laps	Gap	Interv	Best Lap
1	6	7	Team Belgium	238	—	—	59.225
2	13	1	Team Spain	237	1 Lap	1 Lap	59.188
3	14	2	Team Czech Republic	237	1 Lap	20.544	59.086
4	8	9	(Georgia (country)) Team Georgia	236	2 Laps	1 lap	59.181
5	11	3	Team United Kingdom	236	2 Laps	0.097	59.443
6	7	5	Team Peru	235	3 Laps	1 Lap	59.065
7	16	11	Team Slovakia	233	5 Laps	2 Laps	1:00.034
8	5	8	Team Portugal	233	5 Laps	50.217	1:00.016
9	4	6	Team Poland	232	6 Laps	1 Lap	59.825
10	2	4	Team Malta	231	7 Laps	1 Lap	59.731
11	15	13	Team Israel	231	7 Laps	24.820	1:00.525
12	1	12	Team Chinese Taipei	231	7 Laps	22.773	1:00.489
13	12	10	Team United Arab Emirates	230	8 Laps	1 Lap	1:00.474
14	3	15	Team Hong Kong	228	10 Laps	2 Laps	1:00.690
15	10	14	Team Uzbekistan	228	11 Laps	1 Lap	1:00.438
16	9	16	(The Bahamas) Team Bahamas	228	32 Laps	21 Lap	1:00.923
