= 2022 FIA Motorsport Games Auto Slalom =

Motorsport event

Race details
Date	26–30 October
Official name	FIA Motorsport Games Auto Slalom Cup
Location	Circuit Paul Ricard, France
- Medalists
1st place, gold medalist(s)	(Germany) Claire Schönborn (Germany) Marcel Hellberg	Team Germany
2nd place, silver medalist(s)	(Slovakia) Michaela Dorčíková (Slovakia) Dávid Nemček	Team Slovakia
3rd place, bronze medalist(s)	(Georgia (country)) Irina Onashvili (Georgia (country)) Mevlud Meladze	Team Georgia

The FIA Motorsport Games Auto Slalom Cup was the first FIA Motorsport Games Auto Slalom Cup, to be held at Circuit Paul Ricard, France on 26 October to 30 October 2022. The race will contest with identical electric-powered Opel Corsa-e Rally cars. The event was the part of the 2022 FIA Motorsport Games.

Drivers raced around the cones, receiving penalty seconds for every cone knocked off.

== Entry list ==
All entered drivers will compete with identical electric-powered Opel Corsa-e Rally cars.

Team	Driver A (Female)	Driver B (Male)
Team Belgium	Lyssia Baudet	Dylan Czaplicki
Team Brazil	Kaká Magno	Bruno Pierozan
Team Chinese Taipei	Chen Yu-Ju	Lin Chun-Ta
Team Croatia	Iva Damarija	Nenad Damarija
Team Czech Republic	Dagmar Kamas Bělíková	Dominik Šurýn
Team Estonia	Hanna Lisette Aabna	Kevin Lempu
(Georgia (country)) Team Georgia	Irina Onashvili	Mevlud Meladze
Team Germany	Claire Schönborn	Marcel Hellberg
Team Hungary	Tünde Deák	Martin Bognár
Team India	Pragathi Gowda	Prateek Dalal
Team Israel	Yuval Ravitz	Tal Sharig
Team Kosovo	Ermira Topalli	Valon Jaha
Team Latvia	Maija Stakena	Toms Ozols
Team Lithuania	Evelina Drilingienė	Vytis Pauliukonis
Team Nepal	Jiswan Tuladhar Shrestha	Anil Kumar Baral
Team Peru	Andrea Takashima	Roberto Takashima
Team Poland	Sara Kałuzińska	Daniel Dymurski
Team Slovakia	Michaela Dorčíková	Dávid Nemček
Team Slovenia	Rebeka Kobal	Nejc Trček
Team Spain	Laura Aparicio	Miguel García Pérez-Carrillo
Team South Africa	Paige de Jager	Warren Barkhuizen
Team United Kingdom	Laura Christmas	Mark King
Team Ukraine	Tatyana Kaduchenko	Andriy Yaromenko
Team Uzbekistan	Sabina Atadjanova	Olim Akhmadjanov
Team Vietnam	Bảo Bảo	Kristian Béla

== Results ==
=== Classification S1 & S2 ===
Proceeds to the Round of 16
Eliminated

Pos	Driver	Team	Time	Gap
1	Claire Schönborn; Marcel Hellberg	Team Germany	4:52.992	–
2	Martin Bognár; Tünde Deák	Team Hungary	4:55.826	+ 2.834
3	Maija Stakena; Toms Ozols	Team Latvia	5:11.057	+ 18.065
4	Dávid Nemček; Michaela Dorčíková	Team Slovakia	5:12.954	+ 19.962
5	Yuval Ravitz; Tal Sharig	Team Israel	5:13.624	+ 20.632
6	Vytis Pauliukonis; Evelina Drilingienė	Team Lithuania	5:15.713	+ 22.721
7	Mevlud Meladze; Irina Onashvili	(Georgia (country)) Team Georgia	5:15.978	+ 22.986
8	Lyssia Baudet; Dylan Czaplicki	Team Belgium	5:16.868	+ 23.876
9	Dominik Šurýn; Dagmar Kamas Bělíková	Team Czech Republic	5:24.160	+ 31.168
10	Ermira Topalli; Valon Jaha	Team Kosovo	5:26.818	+ 33.826
11	Iva Damarija; Nenad Damarija	Team Croatia	5:29.581	+ 36.589
12	Laura Christmas; Mark King	Team United Kingdom	5:36.693	+ 43.701
13	Sara Kałuzińska; Daniel Dymurski	Team Poland	5:38.046	+ 45.054
14	Andriy Yaromenko; Tatyana Kaduchenko	Team Ukraine	5:38.223	+ 45.231
15	Paige de Jager; Warren Barkhuizen	Team South Africa	5:41.119	+ 48.127
16	Roberto Takashima; Andrea Takashima	Team Peru	5:44.503	+ 51.511
17	Kaká Magno; Bruno Pierozan	Team Brazil	5:45.713	+ 52.721
18	Hanna Lisette Aabna; Kevin Lempu	Team Estonia	5:50.444	+ 57.452
19	Bảo Bảo; Kristian Béla	Team Vietnam	6:13.303	+ 1:20.311
20	Olim Akhmadjanov; Sabina Atadjanova	Team Uzbekistan	6:14.177	+ 1:21.185
21	Lin Chun-Ta; Chen Yu-Ju	Team Chinese Taipei	6:30.189	+ 1:37.197
22	Prateek Dalal; Pragathi Gowda	Team India	7:07.240	+ 2:14.248
23	Anil Kumar Baral; Jiswan Tuladhar Shrestha	Team Nepal	7:16.172	+ 2:23.180
24	Nejc Trček; Rebeka Kobal	Team Slovenia	7:59.581	+ 3:06.589
25	Miguel García Pérez-Carrillo; Laura Aparicio	Team Spain	8:44.421	+ 3:51.429

=== Knock-out stages and final ===
Round of 16
Team Germany	4:32.525
Team Peru	5:42.096
Team Belgium	5:30.445
Team Czech Republic	5:21.705
Team Hungary	4:53.127
Team South Africa	5:10.765
(Georgia (country)) Team Georgia	4:56.524
Team Kosovo	5:05.065
Team Latvia	4:51.421
Team Ukraine	5:09.580
Team Lithuania	5:06.757
Team Croatia	4:58.403
Team Slovakia	4:54.787
Team Poland	5:05.956
Team Israel	4:54.701
Team United Kingdom	4:57.900

Quarterfinals
Team Germany	4:37.620
Team Czech Republic	4:51.883
Team Hungary	4:54.600
(Georgia (country)) Team Georgia	4:50.230
Team Latvia	5:15.662
Team Croatia	4:45.875
Team Slovakia	4:45.093
Team Israel	4:46.040

Semi-finals
Team Germany	4:23.496
(Georgia (country)) Team Georgia	5:12.985
Team Croatia	4:48.846
Team Slovakia	4:46.392

Final
Team Germany	4:22.843
Team Slovakia	4:36.632
Small Final
(Georgia (country)) Team Georgia	4:42.033
Team Croatia	4:50.534

=== Overall Ranking ===
Won the Final
Lost the Final
Won the Small Final
Lost the Small Final
Eliminated in the Quarterfinals
Eliminated in the Round of 16
Eliminated in the Qualifiers

Pos	Driver	Team	Time	Gap
1	Claire Schönborn; Marcel Hellberg	Team Germany	4:22.843	–
2	Dávid Nemček; Michaela Dorčíková	Team Slovakia	4:36.632	+ 13.789
3	Mevlud Meladze; Irina Onashvili	(Georgia (country)) Team Georgia	4:42.033	–
4	Iva Damarija; Nenad Damarija	Team Croatia	4:50.534	+ 8.501
5	Yuval Ravitz; Tal Sharig	Team Israel	4:46.040	+ 8.420
6	Dominik Šurýn; Dagmar Kamas Bělíková	Team Czech Republic	4:51.883	+ 14.263
7	Martin Bognár; Tünde Deák	Team Hungary	4:54.600	+ 16.980
8	Maija Stakena; Toms Ozols	Team Latvia	5:15.662	+ 38.042
9	Laura Christmas; Mark King	Team United Kingdom	4:57.900	+ 25.375
10	Ermira Topalli; Valon Jaha	Team Kosovo	5:05.065	+ 32.540
11	Sara Kałuzińska; Daniel Dymurski	Team Poland	5:05.956	+ 33.431
12	Vytis Pauliukonis; Evelina Drilingienė	Team Lithuania	5:06.757	+ 34.232
13	Andriy Yaromenko; Tatyana Kaduchenko	Team Ukraine	5:09.580	+ 37.055
14	Paige de Jager; Warren Barkhuizen	Team South Africa	5:10.675	+ 38.150
15	Lyssia Baudet; Dylan Czaplicki	Team Belgium	5:30.445	+ 57.920
16	Roberto Takashima; Andrea Takashima	Team Peru	5:42.096	+ 1:09.571
17	Kaká Magno; Bruno Pierozan	Team Brazil	5:45.713	+ 52.721
18	Hanna Lisette Aabna; Kevin Lempu	Team Estonia	5:50.444	+ 57.452
19	Bảo Bảo; Kristian Béla	Team Vietnam	6:13.303	+ 1:20.311
20	Olim Akhmadjanov; Sabina Atadjanova	Team Uzbekistan	6:14.177	+ 1:21.185
21	Lin Chun-Ta; Chen Yu-Ju	Team Chinese Taipei	6:30.189	+ 1:37.197
22	Prateek Dalal; Pragathi Gowda	Team India	7:07.240	+ 2:14.248
23	Anil Kumar Baral; Jiswan Tuladhar Shrestha	Team Nepal	7:16.172	+ 2:23.180
24	Nejc Trček; Rebeka Kobal	Team Slovenia	7:59.581	+ 3:06.589
25	Miguel García Pérez-Carrillo; Laura Aparicio	Team Spain	8:44.421	+ 3:51.429
