= 2022 FIA Motorsport Games Karting Slalom Cup =

Motorsports event

Race details
Date	26–30 October
Official name	2022 FIA Motorsport Games Karting Slalom Cup
Location	Circuit Paul Ricard, France
- Medalists
1st place, gold medalist(s)	(Germany) Annika Spielberger (Germany) Sebastian Romberg	Team Germany
2nd place, silver medalist(s)	(Belgium) Romy de Groote (Belgium) Dario Pemov	Team Belgium
3rd place, bronze medalist(s)	(Poland) Emilia Urszula Rotko (Poland) Karol Krol	Team Poland

The 2022 FIA Motorsport Games Karting Slalom Cup was the second FIA Motorsport Games Karting Slalom Cup, it was held at Circuit Paul Ricard, France on 26 October to 30 October 2022. The race was contested with identical electric-powered karts. The event was the part of the 2022 FIA Motorsport Games.

Drivers raced around the cones, receiving penalty seconds for every cone knocked off.

The competition format was two classification sessions and then knockout stages going from Round of 16, Quarterfinals, Semi-finals and Finals

== Entry list ==
All entered drivers will compete with identical electric-powered Birel ART N35-YR karts .

Each team was composed by two drivers, one male and one female, between 14-15 years old.

Team	Driver A (Female)	Driver B (Male)
Team Poland	Emilia Urszula Rotko	Karol Krol
Team Hong Kong	Sum Nga Mok	Jaden Ng
Team Peru	Harten Carolina	Claudio Bisso
Team Germany	Annika Spielberger	Sebastian Romberg
Team Estonia	Martaliisa Meindorf	Jürgen Laansoo
Team Slovakia	Margareta Mahutova	Lukas Borec
Team Malta	Raisa Psalia	Kieran Galea
(The Bahamas) Team Bahamas	Maria Scott	Caden Burbridge
Team Spain	Lucia Gimeno	Alvaro Gutierrez
(Georgia (country)) Team Georgia	Nutsa Makkhatchadze	Aleksandre Kajaia
Team Uzbekistan	Yasmina Egamberideva	Domenik Suleymanov
Team Nigeria	Damilola Daniela Ademokoya	John Paul Ordue Nenger
Team Kosovo	Rea Gashi	Baran Karabeg
Team Hungary	Lilla Horn	Adam Szabo
Team Albania	Nensi Vathi	Aleksandros Begolli
Team Israel	Eva Garlink	Hen Ido
Team Ukraine	Mariia Kravchenko	Ivan Kondratenko
Team Belize	Rosabell Dueck	Emery Paul Nicholas
Team Canada	Paige Jacey Dietrich	Keaton Chase Dietrich
Team Netherlands	Naomi de Groot	Lukas Stiefelhagen
Team Belgium	Romy de Groote	Dario Pemov

== Results ==
=== Classification S1 & S2 ===
Proceeds to the Round of 16
Eliminated

Pos	Driver A (Female)	Driver B (Male)	Team	Time	Gap
1	(Poland) Emilia Urszula Rotko	(Poland) Karol Krol	Team Poland	5:42.645	–
2	(Germany) Annika Spielberger	(Germany) Sebastian Romberg	Team Germany	5:44.736	+ 2.091
3	(Hungary) Lilla Horn	(Hungary) Adam Szabo	Team Hungary	6:29.906	+ 47.261
4	(Belgium) Romy de Groote	(Belgium) Dario Pemov	Team Belgium	6:30.523	+ 47.878
5	(Estonia) Martaliisa Meindorf	(Estonia) Jürgen Laansoo	Team Estonia	6:45.884	+ 1:03.239
6	(Netherlands) Naomi de Groot	(Netherlands) Lukas Stiefelhagen	Team Netherlands	6:59.689	+ 1:17.044
7	(Canada) Paige Jacey Dietrich	(Canada) Keaton Chase Dietrich	Team Canada	7:03.104	+ 1:20.459
8	(Israel) Eva Garlink	(Israel) Hen Ido	Team Israel	7:34.718	+ 1:52.073
9	(Ukraine) Mariia Kravchenko	(Ukraine) Ivan Kondratenko	Team Ukraine	7:36.119	+ 1:53.474
10	(Georgia (country)) Nutsa Makkhatchadze	(Georgia (country)) Aleksandre Kajaia	(Georgia (country)) Team Georgia	7:38.319	+ 1:55.674
11	(Albania) Nensi Vathi	(Albania) Aleksandros Begolli	Team Albania	7:47.230	+ 2:04.585
12	(Belize) Rosabell Dueck	(Belize) Emery Paul Nicholas	Team Belize	7:54.339	+ 2:11.694
13	(Slovakia) Margareta Mahutova	(Slovakia) Lukas Borec	Team Slovakia	8:30.307	+ 2:47.662
14	(Spain) Lucia Gimeno	(Spain) Alvaro Gutierrez	Team Spain	8:35.979	+ 2:53.334
15	(Hong Kong) Sum Nga Mok	(Hong Kong) Jaden Ng	Team Hong Kong	8:52.717	+ 3:10.072
16	(Kosovo) Rea Gashi	(Kosovo) Baran Karabeg	Team Kosovo	8:55.414	+ 3:12.769
17	(Uzbekistan) Yasmina Egamberideva	(Uzbekistan) Domenik Suleymanov	Team Uzbekistan	9:35.069	+ 3:52.424
18	(Peru) Harten Carolina	(Peru) Claudio Bisso	Team Peru	9:39.590	+ 3:56.945
19	(The Bahamas) Maria Scott	(The Bahamas) Caden Burbridge	(The Bahamas) Team Bahamas	9:52.512	+ 4:09.867
20	(Malta) Raisa Psalia	(Malta) Kieran Galea	Team Malta	11:02.593	+ 5:19.948
NC	(Nigeria) Damilola Daniela Ademokoya	(Nigeria) John Paul Ordue Nenger	Team Nigeria ^{1}	–	–

Notes

- ^1 Despite being shown in the entry list and in the official starting order, neither of the team Nigeria's drivers recorded times.

=== Knock-out stages and final ===
Round of 16
Team Poland	6:01.936
Team Kosovo	6:43.528
Team Israel	6:48.889
Team Ukraine	6:20.294
Team Belgium	5:45.627
Team Slovakia	7:18.387
Team Netherlands	6:23.495
Team Albania	7:26.630
Team Germany	5:28.802
Team Hong Kong	7:55.506
Team Hungary	6:28.179
Team Spain	6:48.231
Team Estonia	5:53.634
Team Belize	6:51.800
Team Canada	6:31.039
(Georgia (country)) Team Georgia	6:21.377

Quarterfinals
Team Poland	5:36.557
Team Ukraine	6:22.954
Team Belgium	5:26.299
Team Netherlands	5:35.773
Team Germany	5:29.304
Team Hungary	5:41.060
Team Estonia	5:33.843
(Georgia (country)) Team Georgia	6:21.959

Semi-finals
Team Poland	5:30.585
Team Belgium	5:26.544
Team Germany	5:15.609
Team Estonia	5:42.575

Final
Team Belgium	5:40.891
Team Germany	5:24.169
Small Final
Team Poland	5:40.099
Team Estonia	5:44.275

=== Overall Ranking ===
Won the Final
Lost the Final
Won the Small Final
Lost the Small Final
Eliminated in the Quarterfinals
Eliminated in the Round of 16
Eliminated in the Qualifiers

Pos	Driver	Team	Time
1	Annika Spielberger; Sebastian Romberg	Team Germany	5:24.169
2	Romy de Groote; Dario Pemov	Team Belgium	5:40.891
3	Emilia Urszula Rotko; Karol Krol	Team Poland	5:40.099
4	Martaliisa Meindorf; Jürgen Laansoo	Team Estonia	5:44.275
5	Naomi de Groot; Lukas Stiefelhagen	Team Netherlands	5:35.773
6	Lilla Horn; Adam Szabo	Team Hungary	5:41.060
7	Nutsa Makkhatchadze; Aleksandre Kajaia	(Georgia (country)) Team Georgia	6:21.959
8	Mariia Kravchenk; Ivan Kondratenko	Team Ukraine	6:22.954
9	Paige Jacey Dietrich; Keaton Chase Dietrich	Team Canada	6:31.039
10	Rea Gashi; Baran Karabeg	Team Kosovo	6:43.528
11	Lucia Gimeno; Alvaro Gutierrez	Team Spain	6:48.231
12	Eva Garlink; Hen Ido	Team Israel	6:48.889
13	Rosabell Dueck; Emery Paul Nicholas	Team Belize	6:51.800
14	Margareta Mahutova; Lukas Borec	Team Slovakia	7:18.387
15	Nensi Vathi; Aleksandros Begolli	Team Albania	7:26.630
16	Sum Nga Mok; Jaden Ng	Team Hong Kong	7:55.506
17	Yasmina Egamberideva; Domenik Suleymanov	Team Uzbekistan	9:35.069
18	Harten Carolina; Claudio Bisso	Team Peru	9:39.590
19	Maria Scott; Caden Burbridge	(The Bahamas) Team Bahamas	9:52.512
20	Raisa Psalia; Kieran Galea	Team Malta	11:02.593
