= 2022 FIA Motorsport Games GT Sprint =

Motorsport event

Race details
Date	26–30 October
Official name	FIA Motorsport Games Touring GT Cup
Location	Circuit Paul Ricard, France
Course	Permanent circuit 5.842 km (3.630 mi)
Distance	Qualifying; 20 minutes Main Race; 60 minutes
- Qualifying

Pole
Driver	(Belgium) Dries Vanthoor	Team Belgium
Time	2:01.112
- Main Race

Fastest lap
Driver	(Belgium) Dries Vanthoor	Team Belgium
Time	2:02.529

Medalists
1st place, gold medalist(s)	(Australia) Matt Campbell	Team Australia
2nd place, silver medalist(s)	(Italy) Mirko Bortolotti	Team Italy
3rd place, bronze medalist(s)	(Belgium) Dries Vanthoor	Team Belgium

The 2022 FIA Motorsport Games GT Sprint Cup is the first FIA Motorsport Games GT Sprint Cup, held at Circuit Paul Ricard, France on 26 October to 30 October 2022. The race was contested with GT3-spec cars. Platinum to Silver drivers will be allowed to compete. The event was part of the 2022 FIA Motorsport Games.

== Entry list ==
Team	Entrant	Car	Engine	No.	Driver
Team Australia	(Australia) Grove Motorsport	Porsche 911 GT3 R	Porsche 4.0 L Flat-6	4	Matt Campbell
Team Morocco	(United Kingdom) Optimum Motorsport	McLaren 720S GT3	McLaren M840T 4.0 L Turbo V8	10	Michaël Benyahia
Team Germany	(Germany) SPS Automotive Performance	Mercedes-AMG GT3 Evo	Mercedes-AMG M159 6.2 L V8	20	Luca Stolz
Team Spain	Motorsport Team Spain by Antonelli Motorsport	Mercedes-AMG GT3 Evo	Mercedes-AMG M159 6.2 L V8	23	Daniel Juncadella
Team Hong Kong	(Hong Kong) KCMG	Honda NSX GT3 Evo22	Honda 3.5 L Turbo V6	25	Marchy Lee
Team Belgium	(Belgium) RACB National Team by Saintéloc Racing	Audi R8 LMS Evo II	Audi 5.2 L V10	32	Dries Vanthoor
Team Brazil	(France) AKKodis ASP Team	Mercedes-AMG GT3 Evo	Mercedes-AMG M159 6.2 L V8	44	Bruno Baptista
(Turkey) Team Türkiye	(Turkey) Team Türkiye by Toksport WRT	Porsche 911 GT3 R	Porsche 4.0 L Flat-6	53	Ayhancan Güven
Team Switzerland	(Germany) SPS Automotive Performance	Mercedes-AMG GT3 Evo	Mercedes-AMG M159 6.2 L V8	54	Yannick Mettler
Team Italy	(Austria) GRT Grasser Racing Team	Lamborghini Huracán GT3 Evo	Lamborghini 5.2 L V10	63	Mirko Bortolotti
Team Chinese Taipei	(Italy) AF Corse	Ferrari 488 GT3 Evo 2020	Ferrari F154CB 3.9 L Turbo V8	68	Evan Chen
Team Lithuania	(Lithuania) Juta Racing	Audi R8 LMS Evo	Audi 5.2 L V10	71	Julius Adomavičius
Team France	(France) AKKodis ASP Team	Mercedes-AMG GT3 Evo	Mercedes-AMG M159 6.2 L V8	81	Tristan Vautier
