= 2022 FIA Motorsport Games Rally Cup =

Motorsport event

Race details
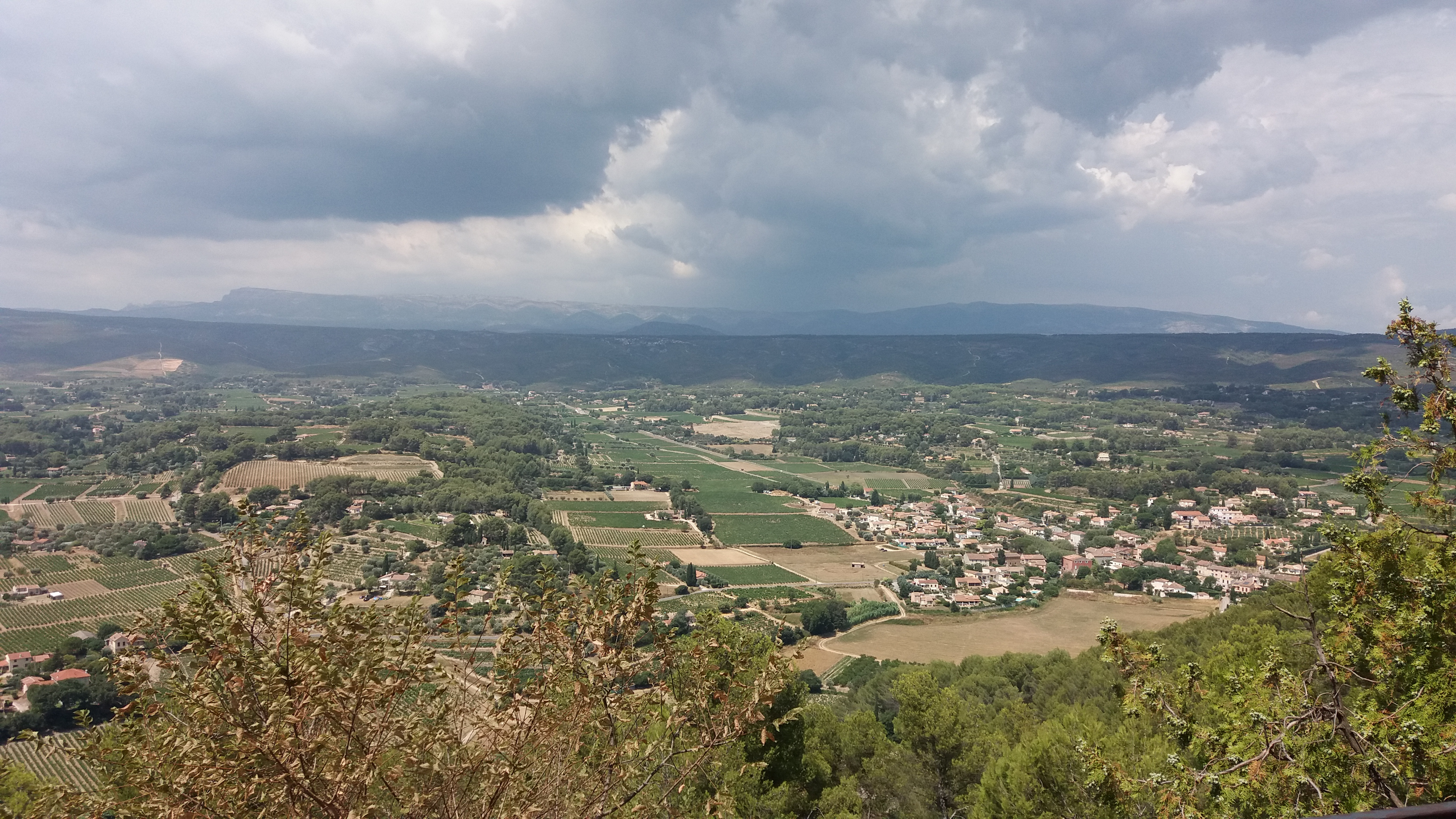
Date	26–30 October
Official name	FIA Motorsport Games Rally Cup
Location	Var region, Provence-Alpes-Côte d'Azur, France
- Rally2 Medalists
1st place, gold medalist(s)	(France) Mathieu Arzeno (France) Romain Roche	Team France
2nd place, silver medalist(s)	(Spain) Pepe López (Spain) Borja Rozada	Team Spain
3rd place, bronze medalist(s)	(Estonia) Georg Linnamäe (United Kingdom) James Morgan	Team Estonia
- Rally4 Medalists
1st place, gold medalist(s)	(Italy) Roberto Daprà (Italy) Luca Guglielmetti	Team Italy
2nd place, silver medalist(s)	(Turkey) Ali Turkkan (Turkey) Burak Erdener	Team Turkey
3rd place, bronze medalist(s)	(Spain) Óscar Palomo (Spain) Rodrigo Sanjuán	Team Spain
- Rally Historic Medalists
1st place, gold medalist(s)	(Italy) Andrea "Zippo" Zivian (Italy) Nicola Arena	Team Italy
2nd place, silver medalist(s)	(Czech Republic) Vojtěch Štajf (Czech Republic) Vladimír Zelinka	Team Czech Republic
3rd place, bronze medalist(s)	(Spain) Antonio Sainz (Spain) David de la Puente	Team Spain

The FIA Motorsport Games Rally Cup was the first FIA Motorsport Games Rally Cup, held across tarmac stages around the Circuit Paul Ricard region, between Marseille and Toulon, France on 26 October to 30 October 2022. The category is open to cars entered by teams and complying with Group Rally2, Group Rally4 and Historic regulations. The events were part of the 2022 FIA Motorsport Games.

== Entries ==
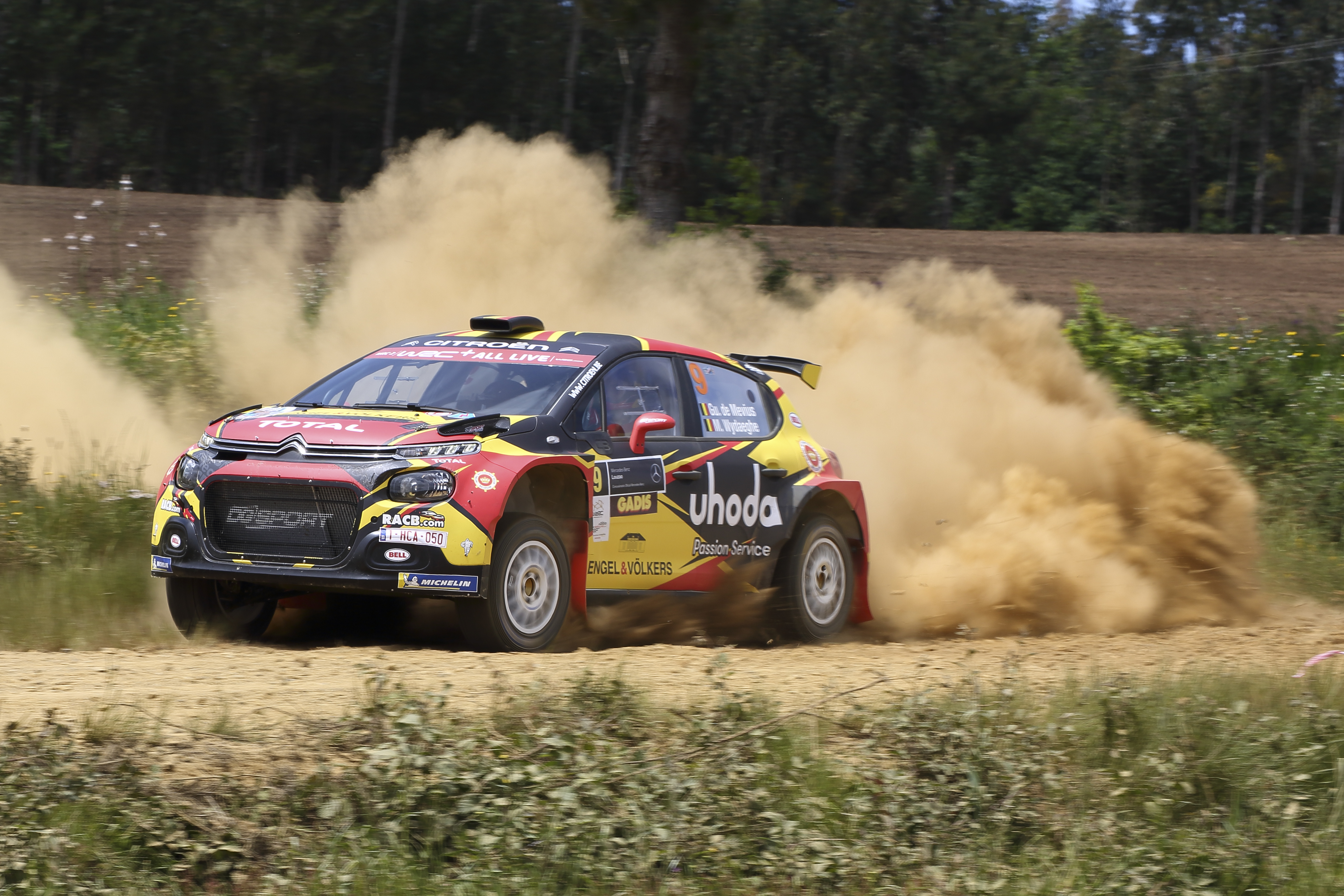
Citroën C3 Rally2

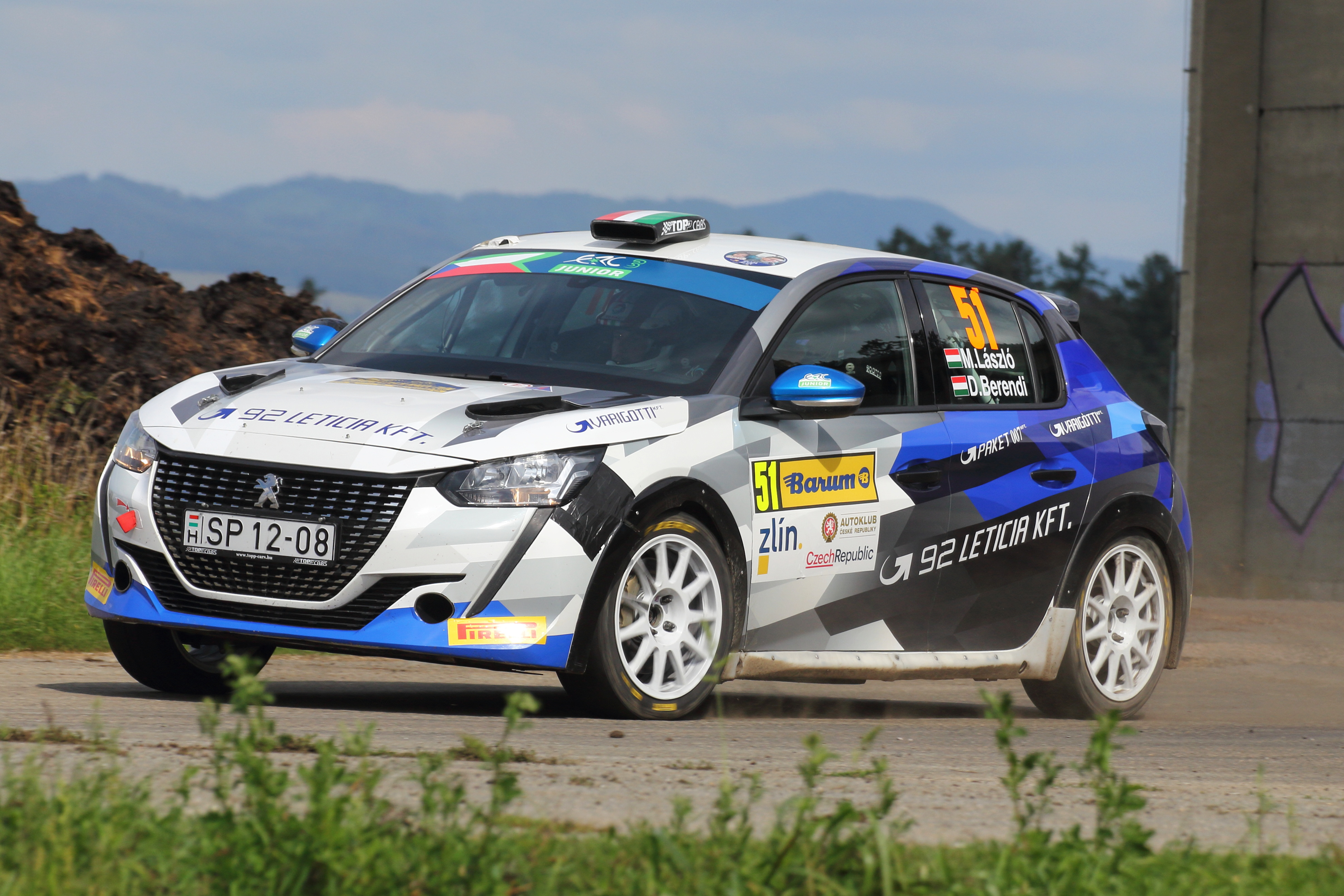
Peugeot 208 Rally4

The following countries and crews are officially entered into the 2022 FIA Motorsport Games Rally Cup:

Entrant	Car	No.	Driver	Co-driver
Rally2
Team Germany	Ford Fiesta Rally2	1	(Germany) Björn Satorius	(Germany) Hanna Ostlender
Team Brazil	Volkswagen Polo GTI R5	2	(Brazil) Adroaldo Weisheimer	(Italy) Rafael Capoani
Team Sweden	Škoda Fabia R5	3	(Sweden) Jari Liiten	(Sweden) John Stigh
Team United Kingdom	Proton Iriz R5	4	(United Kingdom) Oliver Mellors	(United Kingdom) Ian Windress
Team Greece	Škoda Fabia Rally2 evo	5	(Greece) Nikos Pavlidis	(Greece) Dimitrios Amaxopoulos
Team Turkey	Škoda Fabia R5	6	(Turkey) Orhan Avcioglu	(Turkey) Burcin Korkmaz
Team Estonia	Volkswagen Polo GTI R5	7	(Estonia) Georg Linnamäe	(United Kingdom) James Morgan
Team Hungary	Škoda Fabia Rally2 evo	8	(Hungary) Martin László	(Hungary) Dávid Berendi
Team Spain	Hyundai i20 N Rally2	9	(Spain) Pepe López	(Spain) Borja Rozada
Team Argentina	Škoda Fabia Rally2 evo	10	(Argentina) Paulo Soria	(Argentina) Marcelo Der Ohannesian
Team Belgium	Citroën C3 Rally2	11	(Belgium) Cédric De Cecco	(Belgium) Jérôme Humblet
Team France	Škoda Fabia Rally2 evo	12	(France) Mathieu Arzeno	(France) Romain Roche
Rally4
Team Denmark	Renault Clio Rally4	20	(Denmark) Casper Nielsen	(Belgium) Ward Hanssens
Team Netherlands	Ford Fiesta Rally4	21	(Netherlands) Martijn van Hoek	(Netherlands) Nard Ippen
Team Mexico	Peugeot 208 Rally4	22	(Mexico) Gustavo Uriostegui	(Spain) Axel Coronado
Team Portugal	Peugeot 208 Rally4	23	(Portugal) Ricardo Sousa	(Portugal) Luís Marques
Team Belgium	Renault Clio Rally4	24	(Belgium) Tom Rensonnet	(Belgium) Loïc Dumont
Team Turkey	Ford Fiesta Rally4	25	(Turkey) Ali Turkkan	(Turkey) Burak Erdener
Team Greece	Peugeot 208 Rally4	26	(Greece) Paschalis Chatzimarkos	(Portugal) Marios Tsaousoglou
Team India	Peugeot 208 Rally4	27	(India) Sanjay Takale	(New Zealand) Mike Young
Team Spain	Peugeot 208 Rally4	28	(Spain) Óscar Palomo	(Spain) Rodrigo Sanjuán
Team Romania	Peugeot 208 R2	29	(Romania) Cristiana Oprea	(Romania) Alexia-Denisa Parteni
Team Italy	Peugeot 208 Rally4	30	(Italy) Roberto Daprà	(Italy) Luca Guglielmetti
Rally Historic
Team Italy	Audi Quattro	31	(Italy) Andrea "Zippo" Zivian	(Italy) Nicola Arena
Team Czech Republic	Opel Kadett GT/E 16V	32	(Czech Republic) Vojtěch Štajf	(Czech Republic) Vladimír Zelinka
Team France	Porsche 911 SC	33	(France) Philippe Gache	(France) Philippe David
Team Spain	Porsche 911 SC	34	(Spain) Antonio Sainz	(Spain) David de la Puente
Team Germany	Volvo 244 GL	35	(Germany) Siegfried Mayr	(Germany) Renate Mayr
Team United Kingdom	Chrysler Sunbeam Ti	36	(United Kingdom) Tim Jones	(United Kingdom) Steve Jones
Team Slovakia	Lada VAZ-21011	37	(Slovakia) Jaroslav Petran	(Slovakia) Iveta Halčinová
Team Estonia	Lada VAZ-2101	38	(Estonia) Marko Mättik	(Estonia) Arvo Maslenikov

=== Itinerary ===
All dates and times are CEST (UTC+2).

Date	Time		No.	Stage name	Distance	note
Date	Start	End	No.	Stage name	Distance	note
27 October	14:00	16:30	—	—	—	Free Practice
27 October	17:00	19:00	QS	Circuit Paul Ricard	4.14 km	Qualifying
28 October	11:23		SS1	Mazaugues	11.62 km	
28 October	12:21		SS2	L’Espigoulier	11.35 km	
28 October	13:04		SS3	Les Bastides	6.89 km	
28 October	15:15		SS4	Mazaugues	11.62 km	
28 October	16:13		SS5	L’Espigoulier	11.35 km	
28 October	16:56		SS6	Les Bastides	6.89 km	
28 October	20:00		SS7	Circuit Paul Ricard	4.14 km	
29 October	10:16		SS8	Le Grand Caunet	6.73km	
29 October	10:59		SS9	La Sainte Baume	16.72 km	
29 October	13:30		SS10	Le Grand Caunet	6.73km	
29 October	14:13		SS11	La Sainte Baume	16.72 km	
29 October	16:44		SS12	Le Grand Caunet	6.73km	
29 October	17:27		SS13	La Sainte Baume	16.72 km	
29 October	20:00		SS14	Circuit Paul Ricard	13.35 km	Medals Stage

Stage SS14, also called "Medals Stage", will be run at Circuit Paul Ricard on Saturday evening and will feature a Rallycross-style course in which the Top 3 of Rally2, Rally4 and Rally Historic will compete for Gold, Silver and Bronze.

== Results ==
=== Stages 1–13 ===
Qualifies for the Medals Stage

==== Rally2 ====
Pos	No.	Driver	Co-driver	Team	Car	Time	Gap
1	12	(France) Mathieu Arzeno	(France) Romain Roche	Team France	Škoda Fabia Rally2 evo	1:16:26.8	–
2	9	(Spain) Pepe López	(Spain) Borja Rozada	Team Spain	Hyundai i20 N Rally2	1:17:35.0	+ 1:08.2
3	7	(Estonia) Georg Linnamäe	(United Kingdom) James Morgan	Team Estonia	Volkswagen Polo GTI R5	1:17:54.0	+ 1:27.2
4	6	(Turkey) Orhan Avcioglu	(Turkey) Burcin Korkmaz	Team Turkey	Škoda Fabia R5	1:18:21.3	+ 1:54.5
5	8	(Hungary) Martin László	(Hungary) Dávid Berendi	Team Hungary	Škoda Fabia Rally2 evo	1:18:24.7	+ 1:57.9
6	10	(Argentina) Paulo Soria	(Argentina) Marcelo Der Ohannesian	Team Argentina	Škoda Fabia Rally2 evo	1:18:41.3	+ 2:14.5
7	11	(Belgium) Cédric De Cecco	(Belgium) Jérôme Humblet	Team Belgium	Citroën C3 Rally2	1:19:26.5	+ 2:59.7
8	1	(Germany) Björn Satorius	(Germany) Hanna Ostlender	Team Germany	Ford Fiesta Rally2	1:20:16.6	+ 3:49.8
9	3	(Sweden) Jari Liiten	(Sweden) John Stigh	Team Sweden	Škoda Fabia R5	1:22:38.8	+ 6:12.0
10	4	(United Kingdom) Oliver Mellors	(United Kingdom) Ian Windress	Team United Kingdom	Proton Iriz R5	1:22:46.9	+ 6:20.1
Ret	2	(Brazil) Adroaldo Weisheimer	(Italy) Rafael Capoani	Team Brazil	Volkswagen Polo GTI R5	Retired	
Ret	5	(Greece) Nikos Pavlidis	(Greece) Dimitrios Amaxopoulos	Team Greece	Škoda Fabia Rally2 evo	Retired	

==== Rally4 ====
Pos	No.	Driver	Co-driver	Team	Car	Time	Gap
1	30	(Italy) Roberto Daprà	(Italy) Luca Guglielmetti	Team Italy	Peugeot 208 Rally4	1:22:56.6	–
2	28	(Spain) Óscar Palomo	(Spain) Rodrigo Sanjuán	Team Spain	Peugeot 208 Rally4	1:23:12.9	+ 16.3
3	25	(Turkey) Ali Turkkan	(Turkey) Burak Erdener	Team Turkey	Ford Fiesta Rally4	1:23:56.5	+ 59.9
4	23	(Portugal) Ricardo Sousa	(Portugal) Luís Marques	Team Portugal	Peugeot 208 Rally4	1:24:18.8	+ 1:22.2
5	24	(Belgium) Tom Rensonnet	(Belgium) Loïc Dumont	Team Belgium	Renault Clio Rally4	1:24:53.0	+ 1:56.4
6	26	(Greece) Paschalis Chatzimarkos	(Portugal) Marios Tsaousoglou	Team Greece	Peugeot 208 Rally4	1:27:15.1	+ 4:18.5
7	21	(Netherlands) Martijn van Hoek	(Netherlands) Nard Ippen	Team Netherlands	Ford Fiesta Rally4	1:32:05.3	+ 9:08.7
8	27	(India) Sanjay Takale	(New Zealand) Mike Young	Team India	Peugeot 208 Rally4	1:42:24.1	+ 19:27.5
9	22	(Mexico) Gustavo Uriostegui	(Spain) Axel Coronado	Team Mexico	Peugeot 208 Rally4	2:35:38.1	+ 1:12:41.5

==== RallyH ====
Pos	No.	Driver	Co-driver	Team	Car	Time	Gap
1	31	(Italy) Andrea "Zippo" Zivian	(Italy) Nicola Arena	Team Italy	Audi Quattro	1:27:38.3	–
2	32	(Czech Republic) Vojtěch Štajf	(Czech Republic) Vladimír Zelinka	Team Czech Republic	Opel Kadett GT/E 16V	1:30:25.9	+ 2:47.6
3	34	(Spain) Antonio Sainz	(Spain) David de la Puente	Team Spain	Porsche 911 SC	1:32:44.2	+ 5:05.9
4	35	(Germany) Siegfried Mayr	(Germany) Renate Mayr	Team Germany	Volvo 244 GL	1:39:47.0	+ 12:08.7
5	36	(United Kingdom) Tim Jones	(United Kingdom) Steve Jones	Team United Kingdom	Chrysler Sunbeam Ti	1:43:44.5	+ 16:06.2
6	37	(Slovakia) Jaroslav Petran	(Slovakia) Iveta Halčinová	Team Slovakia	Lada VAZ-21011	1:56:47.1	+ 29:08.8
Ret	38	(Estonia) Marko Mättik	(Estonia) Arvo Maslenikov	Team Estonia	Lada VAZ-2101	Retired	

=== Medals Stage ===
==== Rally2 ====
Pos	No.	Driver	Co-driver	Team	Car	Time	Gap
1st place, gold medalist(s)	12	(France) Mathieu Arzeno	(France) Romain Roche	Team France	Škoda Fabia Rally2 evo	7:38.254	–
2nd place, silver medalist(s)	9	(Spain) Pepe López	(Spain) Borja Rozada	Team Spain	Hyundai i20 N Rally2	7:43.398	+ 5.144
3rd place, bronze medalist(s)	7	(Estonia) Georg Linnamäe	(United Kingdom) James Morgan	Team Estonia	Volkswagen Polo GTI R5	7:47.736	+ 9.482

==== Rally4 ====
Pos	No.	Driver	Co-driver	Team	Car	Time	Gap
1st place, gold medalist(s)	30	(Italy) Roberto Daprà	(Italy) Luca Guglielmetti	Team Italy	Peugeot 208 Rally4	8:15.393	–
2nd place, silver medalist(s)	25	(Turkey) Ali Turkkan	(Turkey) Burak Erdener	Team Turkey	Ford Fiesta Rally4	8:25.550	+ 10.157
3rd place, bronze medalist(s)	28	(Spain) Óscar Palomo	(Spain) Rodrigo Sanjuán	Team Spain	Peugeot 208 Rally4	8:26.771	+ 11.378

==== RallyH ====
Pos	No.	Driver	Co-driver	Team	Car	Time	Gap
1st place, gold medalist(s)	31	(Italy) Andrea "Zippo" Zivian	(Italy) Nicola Arena	Team Italy	Audi Quattro	8:24.264	–
2nd place, silver medalist(s)	32	(Czech Republic) Vojtěch Štajf	(Czech Republic) Vladimír Zelinka	Team Czech Republic	Opel Kadett GT/E 16V	8:43.903	+ 19.639
3rd place, bronze medalist(s)	34	(Spain) Antonio Sainz	(Spain) David de la Puente	Team Spain	Porsche 911 SC	9:48.022	+ 1:23.758
