= 2022 FIA Motorsport Games Drifting Cup =

Motorsport Games Cup

Race details
Date	26–30 October
Official name	FIA Motorsport Games Drifting Cup
Location	Circuit Paul Ricard, France
Course	Permanent circuit 5.842 km (3.630 mi)
- Qualifying

Pole
Driver	(Poland) Jakub Przygoński	Team Poland
- Medalists
1st place, gold medalist(s)	(Latvia) Kristaps Blušs	Team Latvia
2nd place, silver medalist(s)	(Kuwait) Ali Makhseed	Team Kuwait
3rd place, bronze medalist(s)	(Poland) Jakub Przygoński	Team Poland

The 2022 FIA Motorsport Games Drifting Cup was the second FIA Motorsport Games Drifting Cup, which was held at Circuit Paul Ricard, France on 26 October to 30 October 2022. The event was the part of the 2022 FIA Motorsport Games.

Each competitor had two solo runs, with the higher-scoring run counting towards a final qualifying classification. Top-16 drivers were eligible to contest the Final Battle stage. Drivers were seeded according to their qualifying results, with the best-scoring qualifier going up against the 16th-placed competitor, second facing 15th, etc. In qualifying, judges scored competitors using four criteria – line, angle, style and speed – up to a maximum total of 100 points. In the Final Battle phase, each judge scored the round individually with a majority decision between a three-person panel determining the winner.

== Entry list ==
Team	Car	No.	Drivers
Team Ukraine	Nissan 200SX	1	Dmitriy Illyuk
Team Finland	BMW M3 E92	2	Juha Pöytälaakso
Team Portugal	BMW M3 E92	3	João Vieira
Team Mozambique	Toyota GT 86	4	Zanil Satar
Team Switzerland	Nissan Silvia S15	5	Nicolas Maunoir
Team Estonia	BMW M2	11	Kevin Pesur
Team Romania	Nissan Silvia S13.5	14	Calin Ciortan
Team Germany	BMW Z3 Roadster	17	Gerson Junginger
Team Italy	BMW E36	19	Manuel Vacca
Team Sweden	BMW M3 E46	20	Mikael Johansson
Team Spain	BMW M3 E46	27	Alejandro Perez
Team Netherlands	Nissan Skyline R33	33	Rick Van Goethem
Team Turkey	BMW M3 E92	34	Timur Pomak
Team Greece	BMW E36	36	George Lagos
Team Czech Republic	BMW M2	55	Marco Zakouřil
Team United Kingdom	Nissan Skyline R32 GTST	61	Martin Richards
Team Belgium	BMW M3 E46	62	Pieter Van Hoorick
Team Norway	Nissan Silvia S14	69	Odd-Helge Helstad
Team Kuwait	Nissan Silvia S13.5	71	Ali Makhseed
Team Hungary	BMW F22	75	Péter Utasi
Team Latvia	BMW M3 E92	80	Kristaps Blušs
Team Luxembourg	BMW M6 E63	83	Rohan Van Riel
Team Hong Kong	BMW M3 E92	84	Charles Ng
Team Poland	Toyota GR 86	86	Jakub Przygoński
Team Lithuania	BMW M3 E92	93	Benediktas Čirba
(Georgia (country)) Team Georgia	BMW 1M Coupé	111	Nodo Kodua
Team France	BMW 1M Coupé	130	Jason Banet
Team Argentina	BMW E36	333	Rodrigo Gallo
Team Austria	Nissan Silvia	360	Daniel Brandner
Team Denmark	Nissan Silvia S15	808	Mikkel Overgaard

== Results ==
=== Qualifying ===
Advances to the Top 16
Eliminated

Pos	No.	Driver	Team	Q1	Q2	BEST Q
1	86	Jakub Przygoński	Team Poland	95	98	98
2	61	Martin Richards	Team United Kingdom	92	70	92
3	71	Ali Makhseed	Team Kuwait	91	85	91
4	93	Benediktas Čirba	Team Lithuania	85	89	89
5	69	Odd-Helge Helstad	Team Norway	89	73	89
6	130	Jason Banet	Team France	79	88	88
7	14	Calin Ciortan	Team Romania	60	88	88
8	111	Nodo Kodua	(Georgia (country)) Team Georgia	0	86	86
9	808	Mikkel Overgaard	Team Denmark	85	75	85
10	83	Rohan Van Riel	Team Luxembourg	83	0	83
11	36	George Lagos	Team Greece	82	76	82
12	36	Kristaps Blušs	Team Latvia	0	82	82
13	75	Péter Utasi	Team Hungary	78	81	81
14	84	Charles Ng	Team Hong Kong	72	81	81
15	11	Kevin Pesur	Team Estonia	0	80	80
16	20	Mikael Johansson	Team Sweden	79	77	79
17	2	Juha Pöytälaakso	Team Finland	78	67	78
18	19	Manuel Vacca	Team Italy	74	75	75
19	33	Rick Van Goethem	Team Netherlands	74	73	74
20	5	Nicolas Maunoir	Team Switzerland	72	0	72
21	360	Daniel Brandner	Team Austria	0	72	72
22	333	Rodrigo Gallo	Team Argentina	64	0	64
23	55	Marco Zakouřil	Team Czech Republic	0	62	62
24	3	João Vieira	Team Portugal	61	58	61
25	27	Alejandro Perez	Team Spain	0	58	58
26	27	Zanil Satar	Team Mozambique	56	0	56
27	62	Pieter Van Hoorick	Team Belgium	52	0	52
28	1	Dmitriy Illyuk	Team Ukraine	0	50	50
29	17	Gerson Junginger	Team Germany	0	0	0
30	34	Timur Pomak	Team Turkey	0	0	0

=== Top 32 and Final ===
Top 32
(Poland) Jakub Przygoński	Adv
(Sweden) Mikael Johansson
(Finland) Juha Pöytälaakso	Adv
(Georgia (country)) Nodo Kodua	Adv
(Spain) Alejandro Perez
(Denmark) Mikkel Overgaard	Adv
(Portugal) João Vieira
(Lithuania) Benediktas Čirba	Adv
(Hungary) Péter Utasi
(Switzerland) Nicolas Maunoir	Adv
(Norway) Odd-Helge Helstad	Adv
(Ukraine) Dmitriy Illyuk
(Latvia) Kristaps Blušs	Adv
(Austria) Daniel Brandner
(United Kingdom) Martin Richards	Adv
(Estonia) Kevin Pesur	Adv
(Italy) Manuel Vacca
(Romania) Calin Ciortan	Adv
(Mozambique) Zanil Satar
(Luxembourg) Rohan Van Riel
(Czech Republic) Marco Zakouřil	Adv
(Kuwait) Ali Makhseed	Adv
(Hong Kong) Charles Ng
(Netherlands) Rick Van Goethem	Adv
(France) Jason Banet	Adv
(Belgium) Pieter Van Hoorick
(Greece) George Lagos	Adv
(Argentina) Rodrigo Gallo

Top 16
(Poland) Jakub Przygoński	Adv
(Finland) Juha Pöytälaakso
(Georgia (country)) Nodo Kodua	Adv
(Denmark) Mikkel Overgaard
(Lithuania) Benediktas Čirba	Adv
(Switzerland) Nicolas Maunoir
(Norway) Odd-Helge Helstad
(Latvia) Kristaps Blušs	Adv
(United Kingdom) Martin Richards
(Estonia) Kevin Pesur	Adv
(Romania) Calin Ciortan
(Czech Republic) Marco Zakouřil	Adv
(Kuwait) Ali Makhseed	Adv
(Netherlands) Rick Van Goethem
(France) Jason Banet
(Greece) George Lagos	Adv

Top 8
(Poland) Jakub Przygoński	Adv
(Georgia (country)) Nodo Kodua
(Lithuania) Benediktas Čirba
(Latvia) Kristaps Blušs	Adv
(Estonia) Kevin Pesur	Adv
(Czech Republic) Marco Zakouřil
(Kuwait) Ali Makhseed	Adv
(Greece) George Lagos

Semi-Finals
(Poland) Jakub Przygoński
(Latvia) Kristaps Blušs	Adv
(Estonia) Kevin Pesur
(Kuwait) Ali Makhseed	Adv

Finals
(Latvia) Kristaps Blušs	1st place, gold medalist(s)
(Kuwait) Ali Makhseed	2nd place, silver medalist(s)
Third place
(Poland) Jakub Przygoński	3rd place, bronze medalist(s)
(Estonia) Kevin Pesur
