= 2022 FIA Motorsport Games =

Motorsports competition in Marseille, France

Circuit Paul Ricard (1C-V2)

The 2022 FIA Motorsport Games was the second edition of the FIA Motorsport Games. The event took place on 26–30 October 2022 with Marseille as a host city, and the Circuit Paul Ricard, Le Castellet as the venue for all the track-based disciplines. Scheduled initially for 23–25 October 2020, and later for 29–31 October 2021, the event was postponed two years in a row due to the COVID-19 pandemic. From this edition onwards, the FIA Motorsport Games will be held every two years, as opposed to an annual format.

Russia was banned from participating due to its invasion of Ukraine.

== Summary ==
All six disciplines from the 2019 edition returned, featuring GT3-spec cars, TCR Touring Car, Formula 4, drifting, karting slalom and eSports disciplines. The new additions included an individual sprint race for GT3-spec cars along the relay format, a rallying event for Rally 2, Rally 4 and historic cars, crosscars and karting for senior and junior classes, a karting endurance event and an auto slalom event with identical electric cars.

475 athletes (397 men and 78 women) from 72 National FIA member organisations will take part. 48 sets of medals will be featured in the 16 disciplines.

== Events ==
On 11 March 2020, it was announced that the Motorsport Games would be expanded from 6 to 15 disciplines for its second edition. A new revision of the programme in January 2021 featured 18 disciplines, with the addition of an Endurance Cup for LMP3 machines and an Auto Slalom event, while the Karting Sprint Cup was split into two distinct age categories.

The Motorsport Games were finally rescheduled on 19 May 2022 with 17 disciplines, as the new Historic Regularity Rally event was taken off the programme. The Endurance Cup was expanded to include GT3 entries for 2022, but it was discontinued on a 7 October 2022 update, three weeks from the start of the event, despite entries having been already announced by nine competing countries. With that, the second edition of the Motorsport Games will feature 16 disciplines.

Motorsport Games Events
1	GT	7	Crosscar Cup Junior	12	Karting Sprint Cup Junior
2	GT Sprint	8	Crosscar Cup Senior	13	Karting Sprint Cup Senior
3	Touring Car Cup	9	Rally Cup Rally2	14	Karting Endurance Cup
4	Formula 4 Cup	10	Rally Cup Rally4	15	Karting Slalom
5	Drifting Cup	11	Rally Historic Cup	16	Auto Slalom
6	Esports Cup				

== Teams ==
Host Nation (France)

Team	GT Relay	GT Sprint	Touring Car	Formula 4	Drifting	Esports	Crosscar Jr	Crosscar Sr	Rally2	Rally4	RallyH	Karting Sprint Jr	Karting Sprint Sr	Karting Endurance	Karting Slalom	Auto Slalom	Total
Team Albania	No	No	No	No	No	Yes	No	Yes	No	No	No	No	No	No	Yes	No	3
Team Andorra	No	No	No	No	No	Yes	No	No	No	No	No	No	No	No	No	No	1
Team Argentina	No	No	Yes	No	Yes	No	Yes	No	Yes	No	No	No	No	No	No	No	4
Team Australia	Yes	Yes	Yes	Yes	No	Yes	No	No	No	No	No	Yes	Yes	No	No	No	7
Team Austria	No	No	No	Yes	Yes	Yes	No	No	No	No	No	No	Yes	No	No	No	4
(The Bahamas) Team Bahamas	No	No	No	No	No	Yes	No	No	No	No	No	No	No	Yes	Yes	No	3
Team Bangladesh	No	No	No	No	No	Yes	No	No	No	No	No	No	No	No	No	No	1
Team Barbados	No	No	No	No	No	Yes	No	No	No	No	No	No	Yes	No	No	No	2
Team Belgium	No	Yes	Yes	Yes	Yes	Yes	Yes	Yes	Yes	Yes	No	Yes	Yes	Yes	Yes	Yes	14
Team Belize	No	No	No	No	No	No	No	No	No	No	No	No	No	No	Yes	No	1
Team Brazil	Yes	Yes	Yes	Yes	No	Yes	No	No	Yes	No	No	Yes	Yes	No	No	Yes	9
Team Canada	No	No	Yes	No	No	No	No	No	No	No	No	No	No	No	Yes	No	2
Team Chile	No	No	No	Yes	No	Yes	No	No	No	No	No	No	Yes	No	No	No	3
Team Chinese Taipei	Yes	Yes	No	Yes	No	Yes	No	No	No	No	No	No	Yes	Yes	No	Yes	7
Team Croatia	No	No	No	No	No	Yes	No	No	No	No	No	No	No	No	No	Yes	2
Team Costa Rica	No	No	No	No	No	No	No	No	No	No	No	Yes	Yes	No	No	No	2
Team Czech Republic	No	No	No	No	Yes	Yes	No	Yes	No	No	Yes	Yes	No	Yes	No	Yes	7
Team Denmark	No	No	No	Yes	Yes	Yes	No	No	No	Yes	No	Yes	Yes	No	No	No	6
Team Estonia	No	No	No	No	Yes	Yes	Yes	Yes	Yes	No	Yes	Yes	Yes	No	Yes	Yes	10
Team Finland	No	No	No	No	Yes	No	No	No	No	No	No	Yes	No	No	No	No	2
Team France	Yes	Yes	Yes	Yes	Yes	Yes	Yes	Yes	Yes	No	Yes	Yes	No	No	No	No	11
(Georgia (country)) Team Georgia	No	No	No	Yes	Yes	Yes	No	No	No	No	No	Yes	No	Yes	Yes	Yes	7
Team Germany	Yes	Yes	No	Yes	Yes	Yes	Yes	Yes	Yes	No	Yes	Yes	Yes	No	Yes	Yes	13
Team Greece	No	No	No	No	Yes	Yes	No	No	Yes	Yes	No	No	No	No	No	No	4
Team Guatemala	No	No	No	No	No	Yes	No	No	No	No	No	No	No	No	No	No	1
Team Hong Kong	Yes	Yes	Yes	Yes	Yes	Yes	No	No	No	No	No	No	Yes	Yes	Yes	No	9
Team Hungary	No	No	No	Yes	Yes	Yes	Yes	No	Yes	No	No	No	Yes	No	Yes	Yes	8
Team Iceland	No	No	No	No	No	Yes	No	No	No	No	No	No	No	No	No	No	1
Team India	No	No	No	Yes	No	No	No	No	No	Yes	No	Yes	Yes	No	No	Yes	5
Team Indonesia	No	No	No	No	No	Yes	No	No	No	No	No	Yes	Yes	No	No	No	3
(Republic of Ireland) Team Ireland	No	No	Yes	No	No	No	No	No	No	No	No	No	No	No	No	No	1
Team Israel	No	No	No	No	No	Yes	No	Yes	No	No	No	Yes	Yes	Yes	Yes	Yes	7
Team Italy	No	Yes	Yes	Yes	Yes	Yes	No	Yes	No	Yes	Yes	No	No	No	No	No	8
Team Japan	No	No	No	No	No	Yes	No	No	No	No	No	No	No	No	No	No	1
Team Kosovo	No	No	No	No	No	Yes	No	No	No	No	No	No	No	No	Yes	Yes	3
Team Kuwait	No	No	No	No	Yes	Yes	No	No	No	No	No	No	Yes	No	No	No	3
Team Latvia	No	No	Yes	No	Yes	Yes	No	Yes	No	No	No	No	No	No	No	Yes	5
Team Lithuania	Yes	Yes	No	No	Yes	Yes	No	No	No	No	No	Yes	Yes	No	No	Yes	7
Team Luxembourg	No	No	No	No	Yes	Yes	No	No	No	No	No	No	No	No	No	No	2
Team Malaysia	No	No	No	Yes	No	Yes	No	No	No	No	No	No	No	No	No	No	2
Team Malta	No	No	No	No	No	Yes	No	No	No	No	No	Yes	Yes	Yes	Yes	No	5
Team Mexico	No	No	No	No	No	Yes	No	No	No	Yes	No	Yes	No	No	No	No	3
Team Morocco	No	Yes	No	No	No	No	No	No	No	No	No	No	No	No	No	No	1
Team Mozambique	No	No	No	Yes	Yes	Yes	No	No	No	No	No	Yes	Yes	No	No	No	5
Team Nepal	No	No	No	No	No	No	No	No	No	No	No	No	Yes	No	No	Yes	2
Team Netherlands	No	No	Yes	No	Yes	Yes	Yes	Yes	No	Yes	No	No	No	No	Yes	No	7
Team Nigeria	No	No	No	No	No	Yes	No	No	No	No	No	Yes	Yes	No	Yes	No	4
Team Norway	No	No	Yes	No	Yes	Yes	Yes	Yes	No	No	No	No	No	No	No	No	5
Team Panama	No	No	No	Yes	No	No	No	No	No	No	No	No	Yes	No	No	No	2
Team Peru	No	No	No	No	No	Yes	No	No	No	No	No	Yes	No	Yes	Yes	Yes	5
Team Poland	Yes	No	No	No	Yes	Yes	No	Yes	No	No	No	Yes	Yes	Yes	Yes	Yes	9
Team Portugal	No	No	No	Yes	Yes	Yes	Yes	No	No	Yes	No	Yes	Yes	Yes	No	No	8
Team Puerto Rico	Yes	No	No	No	No	No	No	No	No	No	No	No	No	No	No	No	1
Team Romania	No	No	No	No	Yes	No	No	No	No	Yes	No	No	No	No	No	No	2
Team Serbia	No	No	No	Yes	No	No	No	No	No	No	No	No	No	No	No	No	1
Team Singapore	No	No	No	No	No	Yes	No	No	No	No	No	No	No	No	No	No	1
Team Slovakia	No	No	No	No	No	Yes	No	Yes	No	No	Yes	Yes	Yes	Yes	Yes	Yes	8
Team Slovenia	No	No	No	No	No	Yes	No	No	No	No	No	Yes	No	No	No	Yes	3
Team Spain	Yes	Yes	Yes	Yes	Yes	Yes	Yes	Yes	Yes	Yes	Yes	Yes	Yes	Yes	Yes	Yes	16
Team South Africa	No	No	No	No	No	Yes	No	No	No	No	No	Yes	No	No	No	Yes	3
Team South Korea	No	No	No	Yes	No	Yes	No	No	No	No	No	No	No	No	No	No	2
Team Sri Lanka	No	No	No	No	No	Yes	No	No	No	No	No	No	Yes	No	No	No	2
Team Sweden	No	No	Yes	No	Yes	Yes	Yes	Yes	Yes	No	No	Yes	Yes	No	No	No	8
Team Switzerland	Yes	Yes	Yes	Yes	Yes	Yes	No	No	No	No	No	Yes	No	No	No	No	7
Team Turkey	No	Yes	No	No	Yes	Yes	Yes	Yes	Yes	Yes	No	Yes	No	No	No	No	8
(United Arab Emirates) Team UAE	No	No	No	No	No	Yes	No	No	No	No	No	No	No	Yes	No	No	2
(United Kingdom) Team UK	Yes	No	Yes	No	Yes	Yes	Yes	Yes	Yes	No	Yes	No	No	Yes	No	Yes	10
Team Ukraine	Yes	No	Yes	Yes	Yes	Yes	Yes	No	No	No	No	Yes	Yes	No	Yes	Yes	10
(United States) Team USA	No	No	No	No	No	Yes	No	No	No	No	No	No	No	No	No	No	1
Team Uzbekistan	No	No	No	Yes	No	Yes	No	No	No	No	No	Yes	No	Yes	Yes	Yes	6
Team Venezuela	No	No	Yes	No	No	No	No	No	No	No	No	No	Yes	No	No	No	2
Team Vietnam	No	No	No	No	No	No	No	No	No	No	No	No	No	No	No	Yes	1
Number of Entries	GT Relay	GT Sprint	Touring Car	Formula 4	Drifting	Esports	Crosscar Jr	Crosscar Sr	Rally2	Rally4	RallyH	Karting Sprint Jr	Karting Sprint Sr	Karting Endurance	Karting Slalom	Auto Slalom	Total
72	13	13	18	24	30	57	14	17	12	11	8	31	31	16	21	25	341

== Athletes ==
Participating National Motorsport Committees
- Albania (4)
- Andorra (1)
- Argentina (5)
- Australia (8)
- Austria (4)
- Bahamas (7)
- Bangladesh (1)
- Barbados (2)
- Belgium (22)
- Belize (2)
- Brazil (11)
- Canada (3)
- Chile (3)
- Chinese Taipei (12)
- Costa Rica (2)
- Croatia (3)
- Czech Republic (12)
- Denmark (6)
- Estonia (13)
- Finland (2)
- France (14) (host)
- Georgia (12)
- Germany (18)
- Greece (6)
- Great Britain (19) (Team UK)
- Guatemala (1)
- Hong Kong (14)
- Hungary (10)
- Iceland (1)
- India (6)
- Indonesia (3)
- Ireland (1)
- Israel (12)
- Italy (11)
- Japan (1)
- Kosovo (5)
- Kuwait (3)
- Latvia (6)
- Lithuania (9)
- Luxembourg (2)
- Malaysia (2)
- Malta (9)
- Mexico (3)
- Morocco (1)
- Mozambique (5)
- Nepal (3)
- Netherlands (9)
- New Zealand (1)
- Nigeria (5)
- Norway (5)
- Panama (2)
- Peru (10)
- Poland (15)
- Portugal (12)
- Puerto Rico (2)
- Romania (3)
- Serbia (1)
- Singapore (1)
- Slovakia (14)
- Slovenia (4)
- South Africa (4)
- South Korea (2)
- Spain (26)
- Sri Lanka (2)
- Sweden (9)
- Switzerland (8)
- Turkey (10)
- Ukraine (3)
- United Arab Emirates (13)
- United States (1)
- Uzbekistan (11)
- Venezuela (2)
- Vietnam (2)

== Medal table ==
* Host nation (France)

2022 FIA Motorsport Games medal table
Rank	Nation	Gold	Silver	Bronze	Total
1	Italy (ITA)	3	1	0	4
2	France (FRA)*	3	0	0	3
3	Belgium (BEL)	2	1	2	5
4	Germany (DEU)	2	1	0	3
4	Netherlands (NLD)	2	1	0	3
6	Great Britain (GBR)	1	0	1	2
7	Australia (AUS)	1	0	0	1
7	Latvia (LAT)	1	0	0	1
7	Peru (PER)	1	0	0	1
10	Spain (ESP)	0	4	4	8
11	Czech Republic (CZE)	0	1	1	2
11	Sweden (SWE)	0	1	1	2
13	Brazil (BRA)	0	1	0	1
13	Kuwait (KUW)	0	1	0	1
13	Portugal (PRT)	0	1	0	1
13	Slovakia (SVK)	0	1	0	1
13	Sri Lanka (SRI)	0	1	0	1
13	Turkey (TUR)	0	1	0	1
19	Poland (POL)	0	0	2	2
20	Denmark (DNK)	0	0	1	1
20	Estonia (EST)	0	0	1	1
20	Georgia (GEO)	0	0	1	1
20	Ireland (IRE)	0	0	1	1
20	Israel (ISR)	0	0	1	1
Totals (24 entries)		16	16	16	48

Preceded by Rome; Italy	FIA Motorsport Games; Marseille; France; II Motorsport Olympiad (2022)	Succeeded by Valencia; Spain
