= Finn Wiebelhaus =

German racing driver (born 2006)

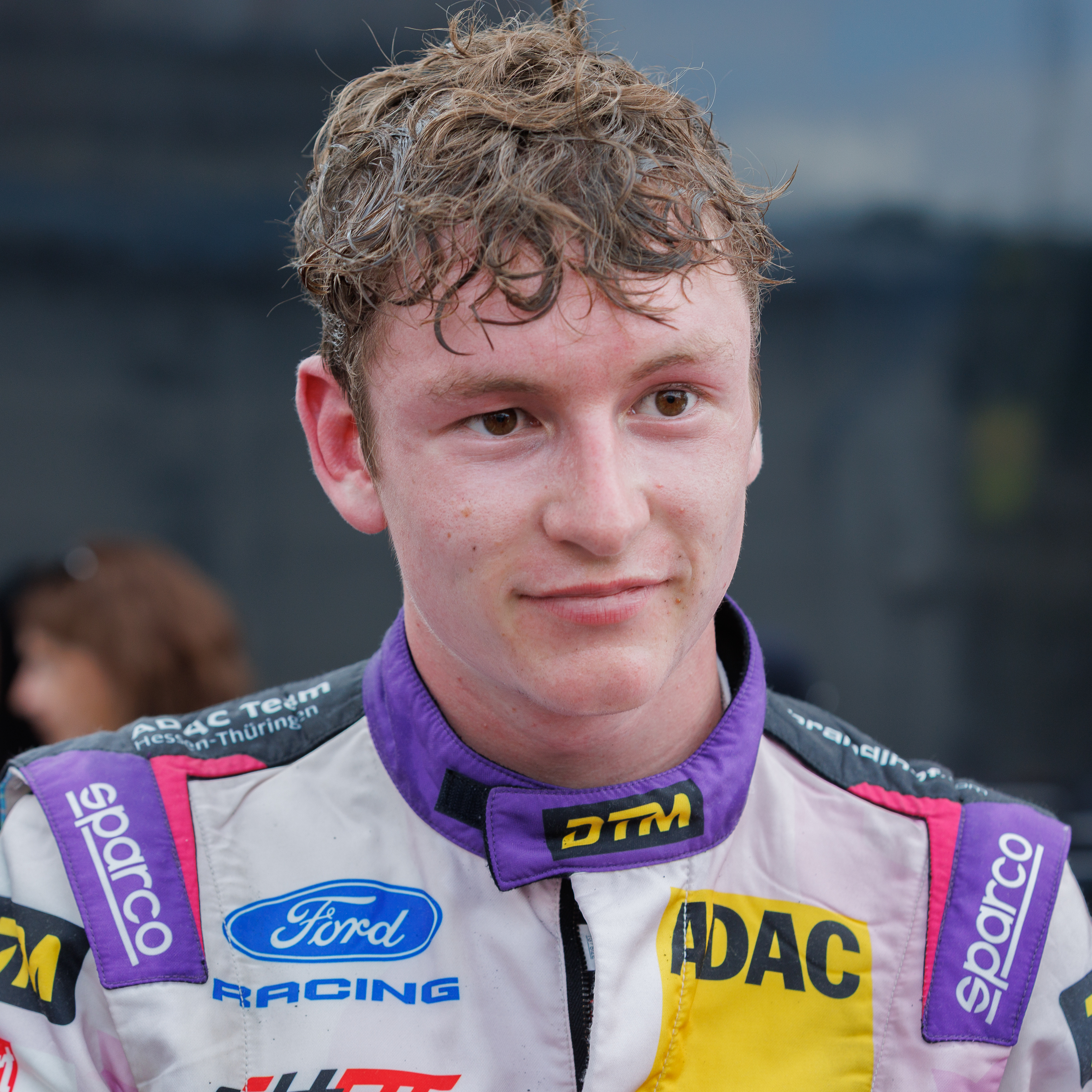
- Wiebelhaus in 2026
- Nationality: (Germany) German
- Born: 5 March 2006 (age 20) Obertshausen, Germany

DTM career
- Categorisation: FIA Silver

Championship titles
- 2025: ADAC GT Masters
Medal record
GT3
Representing Germany
FIA Motorsport Games
Gold medal – first place	2024 Valencia	GT Cup
Silver medal – second place	2024 Valencia	GT Sprint

Finn Wiebelhaus (born 5 March 2006 in Obertshausen) is a German racing driver who last competed in GT World Challenge Europe Endurance Cup and Deutsche Tourenwagen Masters for HRT Ford Racing.

== Early career ==
A late starter to karting, Wiebelhaus initially took up soccer, playing for the Kickers Oberthausen team until 2019, when he participated in a karting course organized by ADAC Hessen-Thüringen. Racing in karts for three years, Wiebelhaus won the South Germany ADAC Kart Cup in 2021 and 2022, along with further titles in the ADAC Kart Masters and West Germany ADAC Kart Cup, all in the X30 Junior category.

In 2023, Wiebelhaus made his single-seater debut in the FFSA Academy-centrally run 2023 French F4 Championship as one of three representatives of the ADAC Formel Junior Team. Racing in all but one rounds, he scored a best result of seventh in race three at Magny-Cours and ended the season 22nd in the standings on six points. During 2023, Wiebelhaus also competed on a part-time basis in Italian F4, racing for AS Motorsport at Imola round and for Jenzer Motorsport at Monza and Vallelunga. In the nine races contested, Wiebelhaus scored a best result of 15th in the season-opening race one at Imola.

== GT career ==
=== 2024 ===
Despite testing for US Racing at the end of 2023, Wiebelhaus elected to leave single-seaters ahead of 2024, instead joining Haupt Racing Team to compete in the GT Winter Series and ADAC GT Masters, driving a Mercedes-AMG GT3 Evo. After winning seven out of nine races on his way to runner-up in the GT3 standings, he finished fourth and second in the two races of the season-opening Oscherlseben round. Despite a fire damaging his car in race one of the third round at the Nürburgring, it was repaired in time for race two, and with it Wiebelhaus finished second to David Schumacher and Salman Owega to score his second podium of the season. In the penultimate round of the season at the Red Bull Ring, Wiebelhaus achieved his maiden series win in race one, in what eventually was his third and final podium of the season.

Also in the same year, Wiebelhaus also represented Germany in the FIA Motorsport Games, racing in both the GT Cup and GT Sprint disciplines. Paired up with Hubert Haupt in the former, the pair took the gold medal by beating the Team Great Britain pair of Chris Froggatt and James Cottingham. In the latter, Wiebelhaus drove solo and led most of the race, until he was passed by Ayhancan Güven with five minutes left and held on to take a silver medal.

=== 2025 ===
In 2025, Wiebelhaus stayed with Haupt Racing Team, as the team switched to Ford Mustang, for a dual campaign in the GT World Challenge Europe Endurance Cup and ADAC GT Masters, in his first season as a Ford Performance GT3 junior. Finishing 11th in the Silver Cup of the former series, Wiebelhaus found more success in the latter, winning at the Nürburgring, Red Bull Ring and Hockenheimring en route his first ADAC GT Masters title.

=== 2026 ===
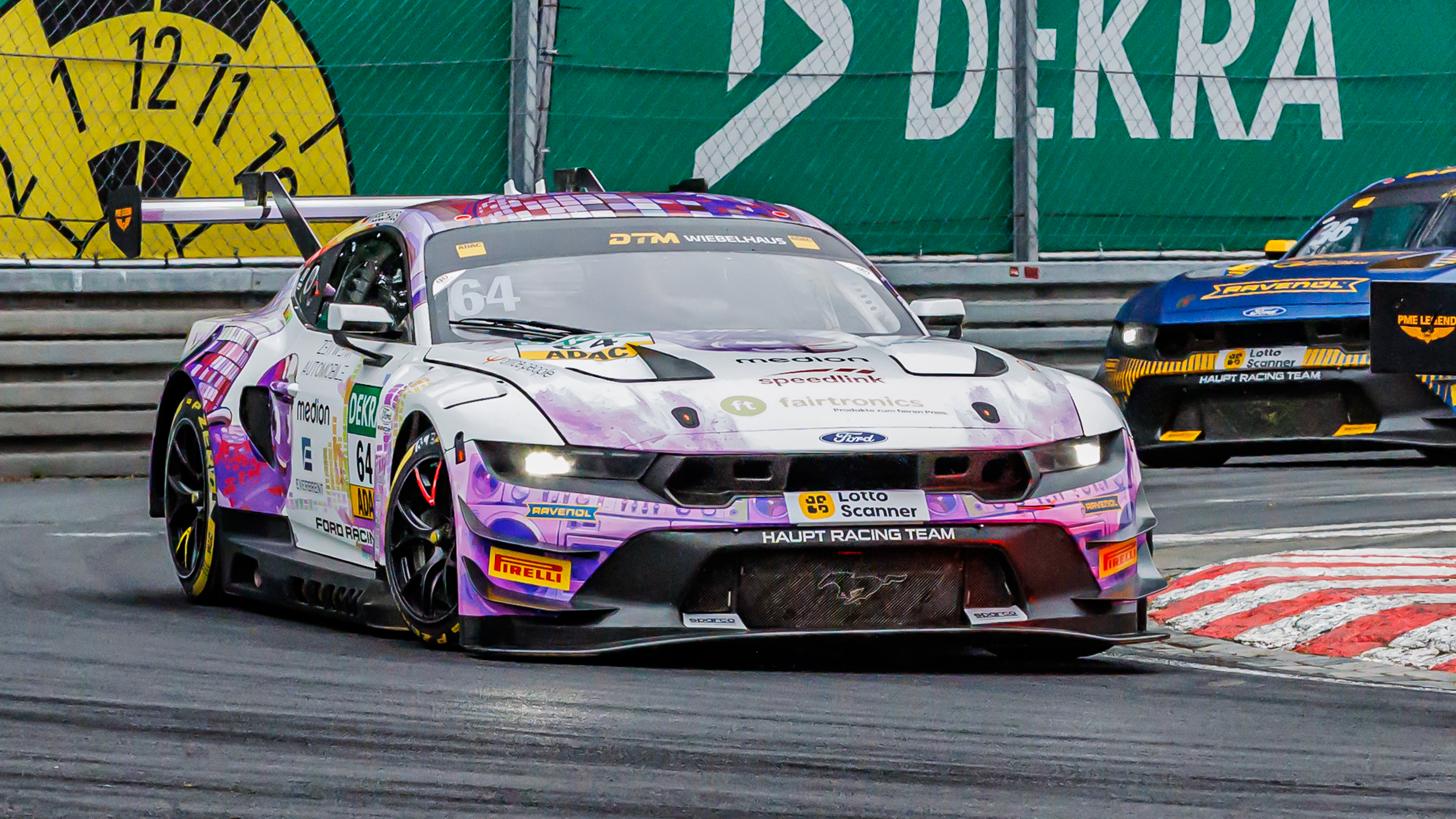
Wiebelhaus leads teammate Arjun Maini during the 2026 DTM round at Norisring

Wiebelhaus remained with the German team for a dual campaign in both DTM and the GT World Challenge Europe Endurance Cup. In the former, Wiebelhaus took the Ford Mustang GT3 Evo's first DTM podium at the Lausitzring, before scoring his season-best result of second a round later at the Norisring, en route to 15th in overall points. During 2026, Wiebelhaus also made his GT4 debut in the final three rounds of Michelin Pilot Challenge for McCumbee McAleer Racing alongside then-points leader Robert Noaker. At the end of the year, Wiebelhaus continued with HRT to race in the GT3 class of the 2026–27 Asian Le Mans Series.

== Karting record ==
=== Karting career summary ===
Season	Series	Team	Position
2021	ADAC Kart Bundesendlauf – X30 Junior	MSC Mühlheim e.V. Im ADAC	3rd
2021	ADAC Kart Masters – X30 Junior	MSC Mühlheim e.V. Im ADAC	NC
2021	South Germany Adac Kart Cup – X30 Junior		1st
2022	ADAC Kart Bundesendlauf – X30 Junior	MSC Mühlheim e.V.	3rd
2022	ADAC Kart Masters – X30 Junior	MSC Mühlheim e.V.	1st
2022	IAME Warriors Final – X30 Senior	MSC Mühlheim e.V.	NC
2022	South Germany Adac Kart Cup – X30 Junior		1st

== Racing record ==
=== Racing career summary ===
Season	Series	Team	Races	Wins	Poles	F/Laps	Podiums	Points	Position
2023	French F4 Championship	FFSA Academy	21	0	0	0	0	6	22nd
2023	Italian F4 Championship	AS Motorsport	3	0	0	0	0	0	36th
2023	Italian F4 Championship	Jenzer Motorsport	6	0	0	0	0	0	36th
2024	GT Winter Series – GT3	Haupt Racing Team	9	7	0	0	9	75.335	**2nd**
2024	ADAC GT Masters	Haupt Racing Team	12	1	0	0	3	151	4th
2024	Italian GT Sprint Championship – GT3 Pro-Am	AKM Motorsport	4	1	0	0	1	29	NC
2024	BMW M240i Racing Cup		1	0	0	0	1	0	NC
2024	Nürburgring Langstrecken-Serie – BMW M240i	MSC Sinzig e.V. im ADAC	1	0	0	0	0	0	NC
2024	Porsche Endurance Trophy Nürburgring – Cup 3	Speedworxx Automotive	1	0	0	0	0	0	NC
2024	Nürburgring Langstrecken-Serie – SP9	Team Advan x HRT	1	0	0	0	0	0	NC
2024	FIA Motorsport Games GT Cup	Team Germany	1	1	0	0	1	—N/a	**1st**
2024	FIA Motorsport Games GT Sprint	Team Germany	1	0	1	0	1	—N/a	**2nd**
2025	Middle East Trophy – GT3	Haupt Racing Team	1	0	0	0	0	0	NC
2025	ADAC GT Masters	Haupt Racing Team	12	3	2	2	7	212	**1st**
2025	GT World Challenge Europe Endurance Cup	HRT Ford Performance	5	0	0	0	0	0	NC
2025	GT World Challenge Europe Endurance Cup – Silver Cup	HRT Ford Performance	5	0	0	0	0	38	11th
2025	Porsche Endurance Trophy Nürburgring – Cup 3 Am	Speedworxx Automotive	3	0	0	0	1	29	16th
2026	GT World Challenge Europe Endurance Cup	HRT Ford Racing	3	0	0	0	0	0	NC
2026	GT World Challenge Europe Endurance Cup – Silver	HRT Ford Racing	3	0	1	1	0	31	15th
2026	Intercontinental GT Challenge	HRT Ford Racing	1	0	0	0	0	0	NC
2026	Deutsche Tourenwagen Masters	HRT Ford Racing	16	0	0	2	2	78	15th
2026	Michelin Pilot Challenge – GS	McCumbee McAleer Racing	3	0	0	0	0	520	42nd
2026–27	Asian Le Mans Series – GT3	Haupt Racing Team						*	*

=== Complete French F4 Championship results ===
(key) (Races in bold indicate pole position; races in italics indicate fastest lap)

Year	1	2	3	4	5	6	7	8	9	10	11	12	13	14	15	16	17	18	19	20	21	DC	Points
2023	NOG; 1; 21	NOG; 2; 18	NOG; 3; 21	MAG; 1; 13	MAG; 2; 13	MAG; 3; 7	PAU; 1 Ret	PAU; 2; 13	PAU; 3; 19	SPA; 1 Ret	SPA; 2; 18	SPA; 3 Ret	MIS; 1	MIS; 2	MIS; 3	LÉD; 1; 16	LÉD; 2; 9	LÉD; 3; 11	LEC; 1; 18	LEC; 2; 10	LEC; 3; 16	22nd	6

=== Complete Italian F4 Championship results ===
(key) (Races in bold indicate pole position) (Races in italics indicate fastest lap)

Year	Team	1	2	3	4	5	6	7	8	9	10	11	12	13	14	15	16	17	18	19	20	21	22	DC	Points
2023	AS Motorsport	IMO; 1; 15	IMO; 2	IMO; 3; 19	IMO; 4; 16	MIS; 1	MIS; 2	MIS; 3	SPA; 1	SPA; 2	SPA; 3													36th	0
2023	Jenzer Motorsport											MNZ; 1; 19	MNZ; 2; 19	MNZ; 3; 23	LEC; 1	LEC; 2	LEC; 3	MUG; 1	MUG; 2	MUG; 3	VLL; 1; 29	VLL; 2 Ret	VLL; 3; 17	36th	0

=== Complete ADAC GT Masters results ===
(key) (Races in bold indicate pole position) (Races in italics indicate fastest lap)

Year	Team	Car	1	2	3	4	5	6	7	8	9	10	11	12	DC	Points
2024	Haupt Racing Team	Mercedes-AMG GT3 Evo	OSC; 1; 4	OSC; 2; 2^{3}	ZAN; 1; 4	ZAN; 2; 6	NÜR; 1 Ret^{3}	NÜR; 2; 2^{2}	SPA; 1; 10	SPA; 2; 8	RBR; 1; 1^{2}	RBR; 2; 10	HOC; 1; 7	HOC; 2; 6	4th	151
2025	Haupt Racing Team	Ford Mustang GT3	LAU; 1; 2^{2}	LAU; 2; 4^{2}	ZAN; 1; 5	ZAN; 2 Ret	NÜR; 1; 2^{2}	**NÜR**; **2**; 1^{1}	SAL; 1; 7^{2}	SAL; 2; 3^{2}	RBR; 1; 2	**RBR**; **2**; 1^{1}	HOC; 1; 9	HOC; 2; 1	1st	212

=== Complete GT World Challenge Europe results ===
==== GT World Challenge Europe Endurance Cup ====
(Races in bold indicate pole position) (Races in italics indicate fastest lap)

Year	Team	Car	Class	1	2	3	4	5	6	7	Pos.	Points
2025	HRT Ford Performance	Ford Mustang GT3	Silver	LEC; 34	MNZ; 19	SPA; 6H; 29	SPA; 12H; 30	SPA; 24H; 35†	NÜR; 20	CAT; 43	11th	38
2026	HRT Ford Racing	Ford Mustang GT3 Evo	Silver	LEC; 26	**MNZ**; Ret	SPA; 6H; 37	SPA; 12H; 19	SPA; 24H; 18	NÜR	ALG	15th	31

=== Complete Deutsche Tourenwagen Masters results ===
(key) (Races in bold indicate pole position) (Races in italics indicate fastest lap)

Year	Team	Car	1	2	3	4	5	6	7	8	9	10	11	12	13	14	15	16	Pos	Points
2026	HRT Ford Racing	Ford Mustang GT3 Evo	RBR; 1; 11	RBR; 2; 8^{2}	ZAN; 1; 16	ZAN; 2 Ret	LAU; 1 Ret	LAU; 2; 3	NOR; 1; 6	NOR; 2; 2^{2}	OSC; 1 Ret	OSC; 2 Ret	NÜR; 1 Ret	NÜR; 2; 16	SAC; 1; 17	SAC; 2; 12	HOC; 1; 10	HOC; 2; 11	15th	78

=== Complete Michelin Pilot Challenge results ===
(key) (Races in bold indicate pole position) (Races in italics indicate fastest lap)

Year	Entrant	Class	Make	1	2	3	4	5	6	7	8	9	10	Rank	Points
2026	McCumbee McAleer Racing	GS	Ford Mustang GT4 (2024)	DAY	SEB	LGA	MOH	WGL	MOS	ELK	VIR; 21	IMS; 7	ATL; 13	42nd	520
