= 2026 Deutsche Tourenwagen Masters =

Car racing championship

Thomas Preining (left) was the driver's champion, while his team Manthey Racing (right) was the teams' champion.

The 2026 Deutsche Tourenwagen Masters was the fortieth season of the premier German touring car championship, as well as the twenty-seventh season under the moniker of Deutsche Tourenwagen Masters since the series' resumption in 2000. It was the sixth season of the DTM to be run under Group GT3 regulations, and the fourth under ADAC's promotion.

== Teams and drivers ==
All teams competed with tyres supplied by Pirelli.

Manufacturer	Car	Engine	Team	No.	Driver	Status	Rounds	Ref.
Aston Martin	Aston Martin Vantage AMR GT3 Evo	Aston Martin AMR16A 4.0 L Turbo V8	(Belgium) Comtoyou Racing	7	(Denmark) Nicki Thiim		All	
Aston Martin	Aston Martin Vantage AMR GT3 Evo	Aston Martin AMR16A 4.0 L Turbo V8	(Belgium) Comtoyou Racing	8	(Belgium) Nicolas Baert	R	All	
Audi	Audi R8 LMS Evo II	Audi DAR 5.2 L V10	(Germany) Seyffarth Motorsport	77	(Germany) Simon Connor Primm	R G	7	
BMW	BMW M4 GT3 Evo	BMW P58 3.0 L Turbo I6	(Germany) Schubert Motorsport	3	(South Africa) Kelvin van der Linde		All	
BMW	BMW M4 GT3 Evo	BMW P58 3.0 L Turbo I6	(Germany) Schubert Motorsport	11	(Germany) Marco Wittmann		All	
Ferrari	Ferrari 296 GT3 Evo	Ferrari F163CE 3.0 L Turbo V6	(Switzerland) Emil Frey Racing	14	(Italy) Matteo Cairoli		All	
Ferrari	Ferrari 296 GT3 Evo	Ferrari F163CE 3.0 L Turbo V6	(Switzerland) Emil Frey Racing	69	(Netherlands) Thierry Vermeulen		All	
Ford	Ford Mustang GT3 Evo	Ford Coyote 5.4 L V8	(Germany) HRT Ford Racing	36	(India) Arjun Maini		All	
Ford	Ford Mustang GT3 Evo	Ford Coyote 5.4 L V8	(Germany) HRT Ford Racing	64	(Germany) Finn Wiebelhaus	R	All	
Lamborghini	Lamborghini Temerario GT3	Lamborghini L411 4.0 L Turbo V8	(Germany) Red Bull Team Abt	10	(Italy) Marco Mapelli		All	
Lamborghini	Lamborghini Temerario GT3	Lamborghini L411 4.0 L Turbo V8	(Germany) Red Bull Team Abt	130	(Germany) Luca Engstler		All	
Lamborghini	Lamborghini Temerario GT3	Lamborghini L411 4.0 L Turbo V8	(Austria) TGI Team by GRT	19	(Germany) Maximilian Paul		1–4, 7–8	
Lamborghini	Lamborghini Temerario GT3	Lamborghini L411 4.0 L Turbo V8	(Austria) TGI Team by GRT	19	(Germany) Christian Engelhart		6	
Lamborghini	Lamborghini Temerario GT3	Lamborghini L411 4.0 L Turbo V8	(Austria) TGI Team by GRT	63	(Italy) Mirko Bortolotti		All	
Mercedes-AMG	Mercedes-AMG GT3 Evo	Mercedes-AMG M159 6.2 L V8	(Germany) Mercedes-AMG Team Landgraf	22	(Austria) Lucas Auer		All	
Mercedes-AMG	Mercedes-AMG GT3 Evo	Mercedes-AMG M159 6.2 L V8	(Germany) Mercedes-AMG Team Landgraf	84	(Germany) Tom Kalender	R	All	
Mercedes-AMG	Mercedes-AMG GT3 Evo	Mercedes-AMG M159 6.2 L V8	(United States) / Mercedes-AMG Team Mann-Filter (Note: Car No. 48 entered as Mercedes-AMG Team Mann-Filter, car No. 80 entered as Mercedes-AMG Team Ravenol. Both cars share a teams' championship entry as "Winward Racing".); (United States) / Mercedes-AMG Team Ravenol	48	(France) Jules Gounon		All	
Mercedes-AMG	Mercedes-AMG GT3 Evo	Mercedes-AMG M159 6.2 L V8	(United States) / Mercedes-AMG Team Mann-Filter; (United States) / Mercedes-AMG Team Ravenol	80	(Germany) Maro Engel		All	
McLaren	McLaren 720S GT3 Evo	McLaren M840T 4.0 L Turbo V8	(Germany) Dörr Motorsport	16	(Germany) Timo Glock		All	
McLaren	McLaren 720S GT3 Evo	McLaren M840T 4.0 L Turbo V8	(Germany) Dörr Motorsport	25	(Germany) Ben Dörr		All	
Porsche	Porsche 911 GT3 R (992.2)	Porsche M97/80 4.2 L Flat-6	(Germany) Land-Motorsport	29	(Denmark) Bastian Buus		All	
Porsche	Porsche 911 GT3 R (992.2)	Porsche M97/80 4.2 L Flat-6	(Germany) Manthey Racing	90	(Switzerland) Ricardo Feller		All	
Porsche	Porsche 911 GT3 R (992.2)	Porsche M97/80 4.2 L Flat-6	(Germany) Manthey Racing	91	(Austria) Thomas Preining		All	

Icon	Status
R	Rookie
G	Guest drivers

=== Driver and team changes ===
- Land-Motorsport switched their car from Audi to Porsche. Bastian Buus replaced Manthey bound Ricardo Feller for his DTM debut.
- Manthey Racing downsized their entry to 2 cars, as the team discontinued their junior team. Reigning Drivers' Champion Ayhancan Güven left the series after competing for over three years, switching to the team's FIA WEC LMGT3, and Morris Schuring will compete in GT World Challenge Europe Endurance Cup with Boutsen VDS. Manthey signed Ricardo Feller from Land-Motorsport.
- Emil Frey Racing also downsized their entry to 2 cars. Leaving Ben Green without a seat, and Jack Aitken left the series after three years to focus on his campaign with Cadillac. Aitken's replacement will be GT World Challenge Europe Endurance runner-up Matteo Cairoli.
- Nicki Thiim switched from ABT Sportsline to Comtoyou Racing, as he replaces Gilles Magnus.
- Both Grasser Racing Team and ABT Sportsline received the new Lamborghini Temerario GT3, replacing Lamborghini Huracán GT3 Evo 2. Both Luca Engstler and Jordan Pepper left Grasser Racing Team, Pepper moved to GT World Challenge Europe with Team WRT. Their replacement were 2024 champion Mirko Bortolotti and Maximilian Paul from ABT Sportsline and Paul Motorsport respectively.
- HRT promoted ADAC GT Masters champion Finn Wiebelhaus to their line up, as he replaces Fabio Scherer.
- Marco Mapelli and Luca Engstler joined Abt Sportsline.

== Race calendar ==
Round	Circuit	Location	Race 1	Race 2	Map of circuit locations	
1	(Austria) Red Bull Ring	Spielberg, Styria	25 April	26 April	2026 Deutsche Tourenwagen Masters is located in Germany	2026 Deutsche Tourenwagen Masters is located in Netherlands 2026 Deutsche Tourenwagen Masters is located in Austria
2	(Netherlands) Circuit Zandvoort	Zandvoort, North Holland	23 May	24 May	2026 Deutsche Tourenwagen Masters is located in Germany	2026 Deutsche Tourenwagen Masters is located in Netherlands 2026 Deutsche Tourenwagen Masters is located in Austria
3	(Germany) Lausitzring	Klettwitz, Brandenburg	20 June	21 June	2026 Deutsche Tourenwagen Masters is located in Germany	2026 Deutsche Tourenwagen Masters is located in Netherlands 2026 Deutsche Tourenwagen Masters is located in Austria
4	(Germany) Norisring	Nuremberg, Bavaria	4 July	5 July	2026 Deutsche Tourenwagen Masters is located in Germany	2026 Deutsche Tourenwagen Masters is located in Netherlands 2026 Deutsche Tourenwagen Masters is located in Austria
5	(Germany) Motorsport Arena Oschersleben	Oschersleben, Saxony-Anhalt	25 July	26 July	2026 Deutsche Tourenwagen Masters is located in Germany	2026 Deutsche Tourenwagen Masters is located in Netherlands 2026 Deutsche Tourenwagen Masters is located in Austria
6	(Germany) Nürburgring	Nürburg, Rhineland-Palatinate	15 August	16 August	2026 Deutsche Tourenwagen Masters is located in Germany	2026 Deutsche Tourenwagen Masters is located in Netherlands 2026 Deutsche Tourenwagen Masters is located in Austria
7	(Germany) Sachsenring	Hohenstein-Ernstthal, Sachsen	12 September	13 September	2026 Deutsche Tourenwagen Masters is located in Germany	2026 Deutsche Tourenwagen Masters is located in Netherlands 2026 Deutsche Tourenwagen Masters is located in Austria
8	(Germany) Hockenheimring	Hockenheim, Baden-Württemberg	10 October	11 October	2026 Deutsche Tourenwagen Masters is located in Germany	2026 Deutsche Tourenwagen Masters is located in Netherlands 2026 Deutsche Tourenwagen Masters is located in Austria

== Results and standings ==
=== Season summary ===
Round		Circuit	Pole position	Fastest lap	Winning driver	Winning team	Winning manufacturer	Winning rookie
1	R1	(Austria) Red Bull Ring	(Germany) Maro Engel	(Denmark) Bastian Buus	(Austria) Thomas Preining	(Germany) Manthey Racing	(Germany) Porsche	(Germany) Tom Kalender
1	R2	(Austria) Red Bull Ring	(South Africa) Kelvin van der Linde	(Denmark) Nicki Thiim	(Germany) Maro Engel	(United States) Mercedes-AMG Team Ravenol	(Germany) Mercedes-AMG	(Germany) Finn Wiebelhaus
2	R1	(Netherlands) Circuit Zandvoort	(Italy) Matteo Cairoli	(Switzerland) Ricardo Feller	(Italy) Matteo Cairoli	(Switzerland) Emil Frey Racing	(Italy) Ferrari	(Germany) Finn Wiebelhaus
2	R2	(Netherlands) Circuit Zandvoort	(South Africa) Kelvin van der Linde	(Germany) Timo Glock	(South Africa) Kelvin van der Linde	(Germany) Schubert Motorsport	(Germany) BMW	(Germany) Tom Kalender
3	R1	(Germany) Lausitzring	(Denmark) Nicki Thiim	(Germany) Maro Engel	(Germany) Ben Dörr (Note: Marco Mapelli originally won the race, but later received a 15-second penalty for speeding under Full Course Yellow. Ben Dörr, initially classified second, thus inherited the win.)	(Germany) Dörr Motorsport	(United Kingdom) McLaren	(Germany) Tom Kalender
3	R2	(Germany) Lausitzring	(India) Arjun Maini	(India) Arjun Maini	(Italy) Matteo Cairoli	(Switzerland) Emil Frey Racing	(Italy) Ferrari	(Germany) Finn Wiebelhaus
4	R1	(Germany) Norisring	(Denmark) Nicki Thiim	(Austria) Lucas Auer	(Denmark) Nicki Thiim	(Belgium) Comtoyou Racing	(United Kingdom) Aston Martin	(Germany) Finn Wiebelhaus
4	R2	(Germany) Norisring	(Denmark) Nicki Thiim	(Germany) Maro Engel	(Denmark) Nicki Thiim	(Belgium) Comtoyou Racing	(United Kingdom) Aston Martin	(Germany) Finn Wiebelhaus
5	R1	(Germany) Motorsport Arena Oschersleben	(Austria) Thomas Preining	(Denmark) Bastian Buus	(Austria) Thomas Preining	(Germany) Manthey Racing	(Germany) Porsche	(Germany) Tom Kalender
5	R2	(Germany) Motorsport Arena Oschersleben	(Austria) Thomas Preining	(Denmark) Nicki Thiim	(Germany) Maro Engel (Note: Mirko Bortolotti originally won the race, but was later disqualified due to the wheel bearings on his car not complying with DTM GT3 homologation. Maro Engel, initially classified second, thus inherited the win.)	(United States) Mercedes-AMG Team Ravenol	(Germany) Mercedes-AMG	(Germany) Tom Kalender
6	R1	(Germany) Nürburgring	(Italy) Matteo Cairoli	(Italy) Matteo Cairoli	(Italy) Matteo Cairoli	(Switzerland) Emil Frey Racing	(Italy) Ferrari	(Belgium) Nicolas Baert
6	R2	(Germany) Nürburgring	(France) Jules Gounon	(Germany) Finn Wiebelhaus	(Germany) Marco Wittmann	(Germany) Schubert Motorsport	(Germany) BMW	(Germany) Tom Kalender
7	R1	(Germany) Sachsenring	(Germany) Marco Wittmann	(Austria) Thomas Preining	(Germany) Marco Wittmann	(Germany) Schubert Motorsport	(Germany) BMW	(Germany) Tom Kalender
7	R2	(Germany) Sachsenring	(Germany) Maro Engel	(Germany) Finn Wiebelhaus	(Germany) Ben Dörr	(Germany) Dörr Motorsport	(United Kingdom) McLaren	(Germany) Finn Wiebelhaus
8	R1	(Germany) Hockenheimring	(Germany) Luca Engstler	(Germany) Maro Engel	(Austria) Lucas Auer	(Germany) Mercedes-AMG Team Landgraf	(Germany) Mercedes-AMG	(Germany) Finn Wiebelhaus
8	R2	(Germany) Hockenheimring	(Denmark) Bastian Buus	(India) Arjun Maini	(Germany) Maro Engel	(United States) Mercedes-AMG Team Ravenol	(Germany) Mercedes-AMG	(Germany) Finn Wiebelhaus

=== Scoring system ===
Qualifying points

Points were awarded to the top three fastest drivers in qualifying as follows:

Position	**1st**	**2nd**	**3rd**
Points	3	2	1

Race points

Points were awarded to the top fifteen classified finishers as follows:

Position	**1st**	**2nd**	**3rd**	**4th**	**5th**	**6th**	**7th**	**8th**	**9th**	**10th**	**11th**	**12th**	**13th**	**14th**	**15th**
Race	25	20	16	13	11	10	9	8	7	6	5	4	3	2	1

=== Drivers' championship ===
Pos	Driver	RBR (Austria)		ZAN (Netherlands)		LAU (Germany)		NOR (Germany)		OSC (Germany)		NÜR (Germany)		SAC (Germany)		HOC (Germany)		Pts
1	(Austria) Thomas Preining	1^{3}	13	7	8	12	10	9	9	**1**^{1}	**2**^{1}	2^{2}	3	3^{2}	2	5^{3}	3	225
2	(Germany) Maro Engel	**3**^{1}	1	6	4	15	7	2^{2}	7	3^{3}	1	6	Ret	5	**17**^{1}	4	1^{3}	213
3	(Germany) Marco Wittmann	5	2	11	3	5	8	Ret	10	Ret	3^{3}	3	1	**1**^{1}	6	3	7	198
4	(Austria) Lucas Auer	2	3^{3}	2^{3}	13	6^{3}	11	4	3	4	11	5^{3}	Ret	11	5	1^{2}	13	182
5	(Italy) Matteo Cairoli	8	14	**1**^{1}	11	8	1^{2}	11	Ret	11	9	**1**^{1}	13^{3}	6	4	18	6	160
6	(Denmark) Nicki Thiim	10	5	9	18	**4**^{1}	2^{3}	**1**^{1}	**1**^{1}	12	12	11	7	8	Ret	16	14	149
7	(Germany) Ben Dörr	Ret^{2}	7	5	2	1	16	10	13	Ret	15	4	Ret^{2}	10	1	11	5	139
8	(India) Arjun Maini	7	11	12	16	9^{2}	**4**^{1}	3^{3}	4^{3}	6	5	Ret	4	12	11	8	8	133
9	(Switzerland) Ricardo Feller	9	12	10	10	3	13	12	12	10	7	9	11	13	3^{2}	15	2^{2}	121
10	(France) Jules Gounon	Ret	4	4	12	7	Ret	7	5	Ret	8	8	**14**^{1}	2^{3}	Ret^{3}	7	Ret	111
11	(Netherlands) Thierry Vermeulen	13	9	3^{2}	5^{2}	13	14	5	6	9	14	13	12	9	7	12	12	107
12	(Germany) Luca Engstler	15	18	8	6^{3}	Ret	6	14	16	2^{2}	4^{2}	7	6	Ret	8	**Ret**^{1}	WD	99
13	(Italy) Mirko Bortolotti	12	16	14	9	Ret	5	8	11	5	DSQ	Ret	5	7	13	2	10	97
14	(South Africa) Kelvin van der Linde	DSQ	**6**^{1}	Ret	**1**^{1}	10	9	Ret	WD	7	6	Ret	Ret	4	18	6	18	96
15	(Germany) Finn Wiebelhaus	11	8^{2}	16	Ret	Ret	3	6	2^{2}	Ret	Ret	Ret	16	17	12	10	11	78
16	(Denmark) Bastian Buus	14	10	DSQ	Ret	Ret	12	13	8	14	10	10	10	Ret	9	DSQ	**4**^{1}	66
17	(Italy) Marco Mapelli	17	19	15	7	2	15	16	Ret	Ret	13	Ret	9	Ret	14	9	9	57
18	(Germany) Tom Kalender	4	Ret	Ret	15	11	Ret	Ret	14	13	17	Ret	2	14	Ret	14	15	49
19	(Germany) Timo Glock	6	15	Ret	14	Ret	Ret	Ret	Ret	8	16	Ret	8	Ret	15	Ret	16	30
20	(Germany) Maximilian Paul	16	20	13	Ret	14	Ret	Ret	WD					Ret	10	13	17	14
21	(Belgium) Nicolas Baert	Ret	17	17	17	16	17	15	15	Ret	Ret	12	15	16	Ret	17	19	8
22	(Germany) Christian Engelhart											14	WD					2
Guest drivers ineligible to score points
—	(Germany) Simon Connor Primm													15	16			–
Pos	Driver	RBR (Austria)		ZAN (Netherlands)		LAU (Germany)		NOR (Germany)		OSC (Germany)		NÜR (Germany)		SAC (Germany)		HOC (Germany)		Pts

Colour	Result
Gold	Winner
Silver	Second place
Bronze	Third place
Green	Points classification
Blue	Non-points classification
Blue	Non-classified finish (NC)
Purple	Retired, not classified (Ret)
Red	Did not qualify (DNQ)
Red	Did not pre-qualify (DNPQ)
Black	Disqualified (DSQ)
White	Did not start (DNS)
White	Withdrew (WD)
White	Race cancelled (C)
Blank	Did not practice (DNP)
Blank	Did not arrive (DNA)
Blank	Excluded (EX)

**Bold** – Pole

Italics – Fastest Lap

1 – 3 Points for Pole

2 – 2 Points for P2

3 – 1 Point for P3

=== 'Rookie of the Year' classification ===
Pos	Driver	Pts
1	(Germany) Tom Kalender	394
2	(Germany) Finn Wiebelhaus	385
3	(Belgium) Nicolas Baert	357

=== Teams' championship ===
Pos	Team	Pts
1	(Germany) Manthey Racing	330
2	(United States) Winward Racing	309
3	(Germany) Schubert Motorsport	284
4	(Switzerland) Emil Frey Racing	254
5	(Germany) Landgraf Motorsport	225
6	(Germany) HRT Ford Racing	200
7	(Germany) Dörr Motorsport	165
8	(Germany) Red Bull Team Abt	148
9	(Belgium) Comtoyou Racing	147
10	(Austria) TGI Team by GRT	113
11	(Germany) Land-Motorsport	63

=== Manufacturers' championship ===
Only points scored by the top two drivers of a manufacturer in races count for the manufacturers' championship.

Pos	Manufacturer	Pts
1	(Germany) Mercedes-AMG	440
2	(Germany) Porsche	356
3	(Germany) BMW	293
4	(Italy) Ferrari	275
5	(Italy) Lamborghini	258
6	(United States) Ford	222
7	(United Kingdom) McLaren	188
8	(United Kingdom) Aston Martin	181
