= December 2022 Gulf 12 Hours =

12th Gulf 12 Hours endurance race

The 2022 Gulf 12 Hours was the 12th edition of the Gulf 12 Hours, and was held at Yas Marina Circuit on 9–11 December 2022. The race was contested with GT3-spec cars and Porsche 992 Cup spec cars. It was the final round of the 2022 Intercontinental GT Challenge, replacing the Kyalami 9 Hours. This was the first of a trio of Gulf-based events promoted by the Driving Force Events (DFE).

== Entry list ==
| No. | Entrant | Car | Driver 1 | Driver 2 | Driver 3 | Driver 4 |
GT3 Pro (10 entries)
| 25 | (France) Audi Sport Team Saintéloc | Audi R8 LMS Evo II | (France) Erwan Bastard | (Germany) Christopher Haase | (Switzerland) Patric Niederhauser | - |
| 26 | (France) Saintéloc Racing | Audi R8 LMS Evo II | (France) Simon Gachet | (Switzerland) Lucas Légeret | (Belgium) Gilles Magnus | - |
| 43 | (United States) MDK Motorsports | Ferrari 488 GT3 Evo 2020 | (United States) Mark Kvamme | (Denmark) Jan Magnussen | (Denmark) Kevin Magnussen | - |
| 50 | (Italy) AF Corse - Francorchamps Motors | Ferrari 488 GT3 Evo 2020 | (Denmark) Nicklas Nielsen | (Italy) Davide Rigon | (Italy) Alessio Rovera | - |
| 66 | (Italy) Audi Sport Team Tresor | Audi R8 LMS Evo II | (San Marino) Mattia Drudi | (South Africa) Kelvin van der Linde | (Germany) Dennis Marschall | - |
| 71 | (Italy) AF Corse - Francorchamps Motors | Ferrari 488 GT3 Evo 2020 | (United Kingdom) James Calado | (Italy) Antonio Fuoco | (Italy) Alessandro Pier Guidi | - |
| 77 | (Oman) Al Manar Racing by GetSpeed | Mercedes-AMG GT3 Evo | (Oman) Al Faisal Al Zubair | (Germany) Fabian Schiller | (Germany) Luca Stolz | - |
| 89 | (Hong Kong) Team GruppeM Racing | Mercedes-AMG GT3 Evo | (France) Jules Gounon | (Spain) Daniel Juncadella | (Italy) Raffaele Marciello | - |
| 98 | (Hong Kong) Team GruppeM Racing | Mercedes-AMG GT3 Evo | (Austria) Lucas Auer | (Germany) Maro Engel | (Germany) Maximilian Götz | - |
| 99 | (Italy) Tresor by Attempto | Audi R8 LMS Evo II | (Germany) Alex Aka | (Italy) Pietro Delli Guanti | (United Kingdom) Finlay Hutchison | - |
GT3 Pro-Am (12 entries)
| 1 | (Bahrain) 2 Seas Motorsport | Mercedes-AMG GT3 Evo | (United Kingdom) Hunter Abbott | (Bahrain) Isa Al Khalifa | (Croatia) Martin Kodrić | - |
| 7 | (United Kingdom) Inception Racing with Optimum Motorsport | McLaren 720S GT3 | (United Kingdom) Ben Barnicoat | (United States) Brendan Iribe | (United Kingdom) Ollie Millroy | - |
| 20 | (Germany) SPS Automotive Performance | Mercedes-AMG GT3 Evo | (Austria) Dominik Baumann | (Australia) Martin Berry | (Germany) Valentin Pierburg | - |
| 33 | (Switzerland) Kessel Racing | Ferrari 488 GT3 Evo 2020 | (Turkey) Murat Cuhadaroglu | (Italy) David Fumanelli | (Zimbabwe) Axcil Jefferies | (Italy) Giorgio Roda |
| 42 | (United Kingdom) Century Motorsport | BMW M4 GT3 | (Philippines) Eduardo Coseteng | (United Kingdom) Daniel Harper | (United Kingdom) Darren Leung | - |
| 44 | (Germany) Herberth Motorsport | Porsche 911 GT3 R | (Switzerland) Daniel Allemann | (Austria) Klaus Bachler | (Germany) Alfred Renauer | - |
| 48 | (United Arab Emirates) S’Aalocin by Kox Racing | Porsche 911 GT3 R | (Belgium) Tom Boonen | (Netherlands) Peter Kox | (Netherlands) Stéphane Kox | (Netherlands) Nico Pronk |
| 51 | (Bahrain) 2 Seas Motorsport | Mercedes-AMG GT3 Evo | (United Kingdom) James Cottingham | (United Kingdom) Aaron Walker | (United Kingdom) Lewis Williamson | - |
| 69 | (Germany) Lionspeed by Herberth Motorsport | Porsche 911 GT3 R | (Germany) Ralf Bohn | (Germany) Patrick Kolb | (Germany) Robert Renauer | - |
| 75 | (Australia) SunEnergy1 Racing | Mercedes-AMG GT3 Evo | (United Kingdom) Philip Ellis | (Australia) Kenny Habul | (Austria) Martin Konrad | - |
| 88 | (United Kingdom) Garage 59 | McLaren 720S GT3 | (Denmark) Benjamin Goethe | (Germany) Marvin Kirchhöfer | (Sweden) Alexander West | - |
| 93 | (United Kingdom) Sky - Tempesta with Garage 59 | McLaren 720S GT3 | (Italy) Eddie Cheever | (United Kingdom) Chris Froggatt | (Hong Kong) Jonathan Hui | (Macau) Kevin Tse |
GT3 Am (8 entries)
| 8 | (Germany) D2 Privat with RAM Racing | Mercedes-AMG GT3 Evo | (Canada) Mikaël Grenier | (United Kingdom) Ian Loggie | (United Kingdom) Morgan Tillbrook | - |
| 11 | (Switzerland) Kessel Racing | Ferrari 488 GT3 Evo 2020 | (Italy) Marco Pulcini | (Switzerland) Nicolò Rosi | (Italy) Niccolò Schirò | (Italy) Emanuele Tabacchi |
| 16 | (Malaysia) EBM Giga Racing | Porsche 911 GT3 R | (Malaysia) Adrian D'Silva | (Australia) Brenton Grove | (Australia) Stephen Grove | (Luxembourg) Carlos Rivas |
| 52 | (Italy) AF Corse | Ferrari 488 GT3 Evo 2020 | (Italy) Alessandro Cozzi | (Lebanon) Tani Hanna | (Italy) Gabriele Lancieri | (Italy) Giorgio Sernagiotto |
| 55 | (Italy) AF Corse | Ferrari 488 GT3 Evo 2020 | (Italy) Stefano Costantini | (France) Alex Fox | (Belgium) Laurent De Meeus | (United Kingdom) Jamie Stanley |
| 58 | (Italy) MP Racing | Mercedes-AMG GT3 Evo | (Italy) Corinna Gostner | (Italy) David Gostner | (Italy) Manuela Gostner | (Italy) Thomas Gostner |
| 61 | AF Corse/APM Monaco | Ferrari 488 GT3 Evo 2020 | (United States) Conrad Grunewald | (Monaco) Louis Prette | (Monaco) Philippe Prette | (United States) Jean Claude Saada |
| 91 | (Austria) Baron Motorsport | Ferrari 488 GT3 Evo 2020 | (Italy) Daniele Di Amato | (Austria) Ernst Kirchmayr | (Germany) Axel Sartingen | (Slovakia) Matúš Výboh |
Porsche 992 (4 entries)
| 49 | (Italy) Racevent | Porsche 992 GT3 Cup | (Italy) Pablo Biolghini | (Italy) Marco Cassarà | (Italy) Davide Scannicchio | (Italy) Johannes Zelger |
| 92 | (Switzerland) Centri Porsche Ticino | Porsche 992 GT3 Cup | (Switzerland) Alex Fontana | (Switzerland) Ivan Jacoma | (United States) Ashish Patel | - |
| 95 | (United Kingdom) Duel Racing with Toro Verde GT | Porsche 992 GT3 Cup | (United Arab Emirates) Nabil Moutran | (United Arab Emirates) Ramzi Moutran | (United Arab Emirates) Sami Moutran | - |
| 96 | (United Kingdom) Duel Racing with Toro Verde GT | Porsche 992 GT3 Cup | (United Kingdom) Nigel Armstrong | (United Kingdom) David Fairbrother | (United Kingdom) Stephen Liquorish | (United Kingdom) James Townsend |

== Classification ==
=== Race result ===
Class winners denoted in bold.

| Pos. | Class | # | Team | Drivers | Car | Laps | Time/Gap/Retired |
|---|---|---|---|---|---|---|---|
| 1 | P | **71** | **(Italy) AF Corse - Francorchamps Motors** | **(United Kingdom) James Calado** **(Italy) Antonio Fuoco** **(Italy) Alessandro Pier Guidi** | **Ferrari 488 GT3 Evo 2020** | **335** | **12:01:41.695** |
| 2 | P | 50 | (Italy) AF Corse - Francorchamps Motors | (Denmark) Nicklas Nielsen (Italy) Davide Rigon (Italy) Alessio Rovera | Ferrari 488 GT3 Evo 2020 | 335 | +14.388 |
| 3 | P | 25 | (France) Audi Sport Team Saintéloc | (France) Erwan Bastard (Germany) Christopher Haase (Switzerland) Patric Niederhauser | Audi R8 LMS Evo II | 335 | +15.139 |
| 4 | P | 77 | (Oman) Al Manar Racing by GetSpeed | (Oman) Al Faisal Al Zubair (Germany) Luca Stolz (Germany) Fabian Schiller | Mercedes-AMG GT3 Evo | 335 | +29.779 |
| 5 | PA | **75** | **(Australia) SunEnergy1 Racing** | **(United Kingdom) Philip Ellis** **(Australia) Kenny Habul** **(Austria) Martin Konrad** | **Mercedes-AMG GT3 Evo** | **334** | **+1 Lap** |
| 6 | PA | 88 | (United Kingdom) Garage 59 | (Denmark) Benjamin Goethe (Germany) Marvin Kirchhöfer (Sweden) Alexander West | McLaren 720S GT3 | 333 | +2 Laps |
| 7 | P | 43 | (United States) MDK Motorsports | (United States) Mark Kvamme (Denmark) Jan Magnussen (Denmark) Kevin Magnussen | Ferrari 488 GT3 Evo 2020 | 333 | +2 Laps |
| 8 | PA | 93 | (United Kingdom) Sky - Tempesta with Garage 59 | (Italy) Eddie Cheever III (United Kingdom) Chris Froggatt (Hong Kong) Jonathan Hui (Macau) Kevin Tse | McLaren 720S GT3 | 332 | +3 Laps |
| 9 | P | 99 | (Italy) Tresor by Attempto | (Germany) Alex Aka (Italy) Pietro Delli Guanti (United Kingdom) Finlay Hutchinson | Audi R8 LMS Evo II | 332 | +3 Laps |
| 10 | PA | 1 | (Bahrain) 2 Seas Motorsport | (United Kingdom) Hunter Abbott (Bahrain) Isa Al Khalifa (Croatia) Martin Kodrić | Mercedes-AMG GT3 Evo | 332 | +3 Laps |
| 11 | PA | 69 | (Germany) Lionspeed by Herberth Motorsport | (Germany) Ralf Bohn (Germany) Patrick Kolb (Germany) Robert Renauer | Porsche 911 GT3 R | 331 | +4 Laps |
| 12 | Am | **61** | **AF Corse/APM Monaco** | **(United States) Conrad Grunewald** **(Monaco) Louis Prette** **(Monaco) Philippe Prette** **(United States) Jean Claude Saada** | **Ferrari 488 GT3 Evo 2020** | **328** | **+7 Laps** |
| 13 | Am | 55 | (Italy) AF Corse | (Italy) Stefano Costantini (France) Alex Fox (Belgium) Laurent De Meeus (United Kingdom) Jamie Stanley | Ferrari 488 GT3 Evo 2020 | 325 | +10 Laps |
| 14 | Am | 52 | (Italy) AF Corse | (Italy) Alessandro Cozzi (Lebanon) Tani Hanna (Italy) Gabriele Lancieri (Italy) Giorgio Sernagiotto | Ferrari 488 GT3 Evo 2020 | 324 | +11 Laps |
| 15 | Am | 8 | (Germany) D2 Privat with RAM Racing | (Canada) Mikaël Grenier (United Kingdom) Ian Loggie (United Kingdom) Morgan Tillbrook | Mercedes-AMG GT3 Evo | 320 | +15 Laps |
| 16 | PA | 48 | (United Arab Emirates) S'Aalocin by Kox Racing | (Belgium) Tom Boonen (Netherlands) Peter Kox (Netherlands) Stéphane Kox (Netherlands) Nico Pronk | Porsche 911 GT3 R | 319 | +16 Laps |
| 17 | 992 | **92** | **(Switzerland) Centri Porsche Ticino** | **(Switzerland) Alex Fontana** **(Switzerland) Ivan Tacoma** **(United States) Ashish Patel** | **Porsche 992 GT3 Cup** | **310** | **+25 Laps** |
| 18 | 992 | 95 | (United Kingdom) Duel Racing with Toro Verde GT | (United Arab Emirates) Nabil Moutran (United Arab Emirates) Ramzi Moutran (United Arab Emirates) Sami Moutran | Porsche 992 GT3 Cup | 308 | +27 Laps |
| 19 | PA | 42 | (United Kingdom) Century Motorsport | (Philippines) Eduardo Coseteng (United Kingdom) Dan Harper (United Kingdom) Darren Leung | BMW M4 GT3 | 308 | +27 Laps |
| 20 | Am | 91 | (Austria) Baron Motorsport | (Italy) Daniele Di Amato (Austria) Ernst Kirchmayr (Germany) Axel Sartingen (Slovakia) Matúš Výboh | Ferrari 488 GT3 Evo 2020 | 307 | +28 Laps |
| 21 | PA | 44 | (Germany) Herberth Motorsport | (Switzerland) Daniel Allermann (Austria) Klaus Bachler (Germany) Alfred Renauer | Porsche 911 GT3 R | 292 | +43 Laps |
| 22 | 992 | 49 | (Italy) Racevent | (Italy) Pablo Biolghini (Italy) Marco Cassarà (Italy) Davide Scannicchio (Italy) Johannes Zelger | Porsche 992 GT3 Cup | 291 | +44 Laps |
| 23 | P | 26 | (France) Saintéloc Racing | (France) Simon Gachet (Switzerland) Lucas Légeret (Belgium) Gilles Magnus | Audi R8 LMS Evo II | 287 | +48 Laps |
| 24 | PA | 51 | (Bahrain) 2 Seas Motorsport | (United Kingdom) James Cottingham (United Kingdom) Aaron Walker (United Kingdom) Lewis Williamson | Mercedes-AMG GT3 Evo | 282 | +53 Laps |
| 25 | P | 66 | (Italy) Audi Sport Team Tresor | (San Marino) Mattia Drudi (South Africa) Kelvin van der Linde (Germany) Dennis Marschall | Audi R8 LMS Evo II | 245 | +90 Laps |
| 26 | Am | 58 | (Italy) MP Racing | (Italy) Corinna Gostner (Italy) David Gostner (Italy) Manuela Gostner (Italy) Thomas Gostner | Mercedes-AMG GT3 Evo | 205 | +130 Laps |
| 27 | PA | 20 | (Germany) SPS Automotive Performance | (Austria) Dominik Baumann (Australia) Martin Berry (Germany) Valentin Pierburg | Mercedes-AMG GT3 Evo | 196 | +139 Laps |
| 28 | Am | 11 | (Switzerland) Kessel Racing | (Italy) Marco Pulcini (Switzerland) Nicolo Rosi (Italy) Niccolò Schirò (Italy) Emanuele Tabacchi | Ferrari 488 GT3 Evo 2020 | 149 | +186 Laps |
| 29 | PA | 7 | (United Kingdom) Inception Racing with Optimum Motorsport | (United Kingdom) Ben Barnicoat (United States) Brendan Iribe (United Kingdom) Ollie Millroy | McLaren 720S GT3 | 91 | +244 Laps |
| 30 | 992 | 96 | (United Kingdom) Duel Racing with Toro Verde GT | (United Kingdom) Nigel Armstrong (United Kingdom) David Fairbrother (United Kingdom) Stephen Liquorish (United Kingdom) James Townsend | Porsche 992 GT3 Cup | 77 | +258 Laps |
| 31 | Am | 16 | (Malaysia) EBM Giga Racing | (Malaysia) Adrian D'Silva (Australia) Brenton Grove (Australia) Stephen Grove (Luxembourg) Carlos Rivas | Porsche 911 GT3 R | 67 | +268 Laps |
| 32 | P | 89 | (Hong Kong) Team GruppeM Racing | (France) Jules Gounon (Spain) Daniel Juncadella (Switzerland) Raffaele Marciello | Mercedes-AMG GT3 Evo | 47 | +288 Laps |
| 33 | PA | 33 | (Switzerland) Kessel Racing | (Turkey) Murat Cuhadaroglu (Italy) David Fumanelli (Zimbabwe) Axcil Jefferies (Italy) Giorgio Roda | Ferrari 488 GT3 Evo 2020 | 38 | +297 Laps |
| 34 | P | 98 | (Hong Kong) Team GruppeM Racing | (Austria) Lucas Auer (Germany) Maro Engel (Germany) Maximilian Götz | Mercedes-AMG GT3 Evo | 30 | +305 Laps |

Intercontinental GT Challenge
| Previous race: 2022 Indianapolis 8 Hours | 2022 season | Next race: 2023 Bathurst 12 Hour |
