= 2024 FIA Motorsport Games GT Sprint =

Motorsport event

Race details
Date	23–27 October 2024
Official name	FIA Motorsport Games Touring GT Cup
Location	Circuit Ricardo Tormo, Spain
Course	Permanent circuit 4.005 km (2.489 mi)
Distance	Qualifying; 20 minutes Main Race; 60 minutes
- Qualifying

Pole
- Driver
- Time
- Race

Fastest lap
- Driver
- Time

Medalists
- 1st place, gold medalist(s)
- 2nd place, silver medalist(s)
- 3rd place, bronze medalist(s)

The 2024 FIA Motorsport Games GT Sprint Cup is the second FIA Motorsport Games GT Sprint Cup, held at Circuit Ricardo Tormo, Spain on 23 October to 27 October 2024. The race was contested with GT3-spec cars. Platinum to Silver drivers will be allowed to compete. The event was part of the 2024 FIA Motorsport Games.

== Entry List ==
Team	Entrant	Car	Engine	No.	Driver
Team Germany	(Germany) Haupt Racing Team	Mercedes-AMG GT3 Evo	Mercedes-AMG M159 6.2 L V8	4	Finn Wiebelhaus
Team United Arab Emirates	(United Arab Emirates) Rabdan Motorsport	Porsche 911 GT3 R (992)	Porsche M97/80 4.2 L Flat-6	7	Saif Alameri
Team Malaysia	(Malaysia) Arrows Racing	Lamborghini Huracán GT3 Evo 2	Lamborghini DGF 5.2 L V10	8	Jazeman Jaafar
Team Spain	(Germany) Haupt Racing Team	Mercedes-AMG GT3 Evo	Mercedes-AMG M159 6.2 L V8	12	Daniel Juncadella
Team Chinese Taipei	(Chinese Taipei) D2 Racing Team	Mercedes-AMG GT3 Evo	Mercedes-AMG M159 6.2 L V8	22	Yang Liao
(Turkey) Team Türkiye	(France) Schumacher CLRT	Porsche 911 GT3 R (992)	Porsche M97/80 4.2 L Flat-6	53	Ayhancan Güven
Team Lithuania	(Lithuania) Juta Racing	Audi R8 LMS Evo II	Audi DAR 5.2 L V10	71	Eimantas Navikauskas
Team United Kingdom	(Italy) AF Corse	Ferrari 296 GT3	Ferrari F163CE 3.0 L Turbo V6	91	Darren Leung

== Results ==
=== Qualifying 1 ===
Pos	No.	Driver	Team	Time	Gap
1	53	Ayhancan Güven	(Turkey) Team Türkiye	1:39.600	—
2	4	Finn Wiebelhaus	Team Germany	1:40.457	+0.857
3	12	Daniel Juncadella	Team Spain	1:42.247	+2.647
4	8	Jazeman Jaafar	Team Malaysia	1:42.522	+2.922
5	22	Yang Liao	Team Chinese Taipei	1:47.060	+7.460
6	91	Darren Leung	Team United Kingdom	1:51.052	+11.452
7	7	Saif Alameri	Team United Arab Emirates	1:53.329	+13.729
8	71	Eimantas Navikauskas	Team Lithuania	1:58.116	+18.516

=== Qualifying 2 (Super Pole) ===
Pos	No.	Driver	Team	Time	Gap
1	53	Ayhancan Güven	(Turkey) Team Türkiye	1:30.943	—
2	4	Finn Wiebelhaus	Team Germany	1:31.240	+0.297
3	12	Daniel Juncadella	Team Spain	1:31.435	+0.492
4	91	Darren Leung	Team United Kingdom	1:34.488	+3.545
5	8	Jazeman Jaafar	Team Malaysia	1:35.357	+4.414
6	22	Yang Liao	Team Chinese Taipei	1:41.079	+10.136
7	7	Saif Alameri	Team United Arab Emirates	1:42.207	+11.264
8	71	Eimantas Navikauskas	Team Lithuania	1:55.658	+24.715

=== Race ===
Pos	No.	Driver	Team	Laps	Time/Retired	Grid
1st place, gold medalist(s)	53	Ayhancan Güven	(Turkey) Team Türkiye	26	41:28.429	1
2nd place, silver medalist(s)	4	Finn Wiebelhaus	Team Germany	26	+ 0.520	2
3rd place, bronze medalist(s)	12	Daniel Juncadella	Team Spain	26	+ 2.661	3
4	91	Darren Leung	Team United Kingdom	26	+ 44.732	4
5	8	Jazeman Jaafar	Team Malaysia	26	+ 53.572	5
6	71	Eimantas Navikauskas	Team Lithuania	26	+ 54.758	8
7	7	Saif Alameri	Team United Arab Emirates	25	+ 1 Lap ^{1}	7
RET	22	Yang Liao	Team Chinese Taipei	3	+ 23 Laps	6
Fastest lap: Ayhancan Güven ( (Turkey) Team Türkiye) – 1:31.296 (Lap 4)

Notes

- ^1 – CAR 7 - 5 SEC. TIME PENALTY - TRACK LIMITS
