= Hubert Haupt =

German racing driver (born 1969)

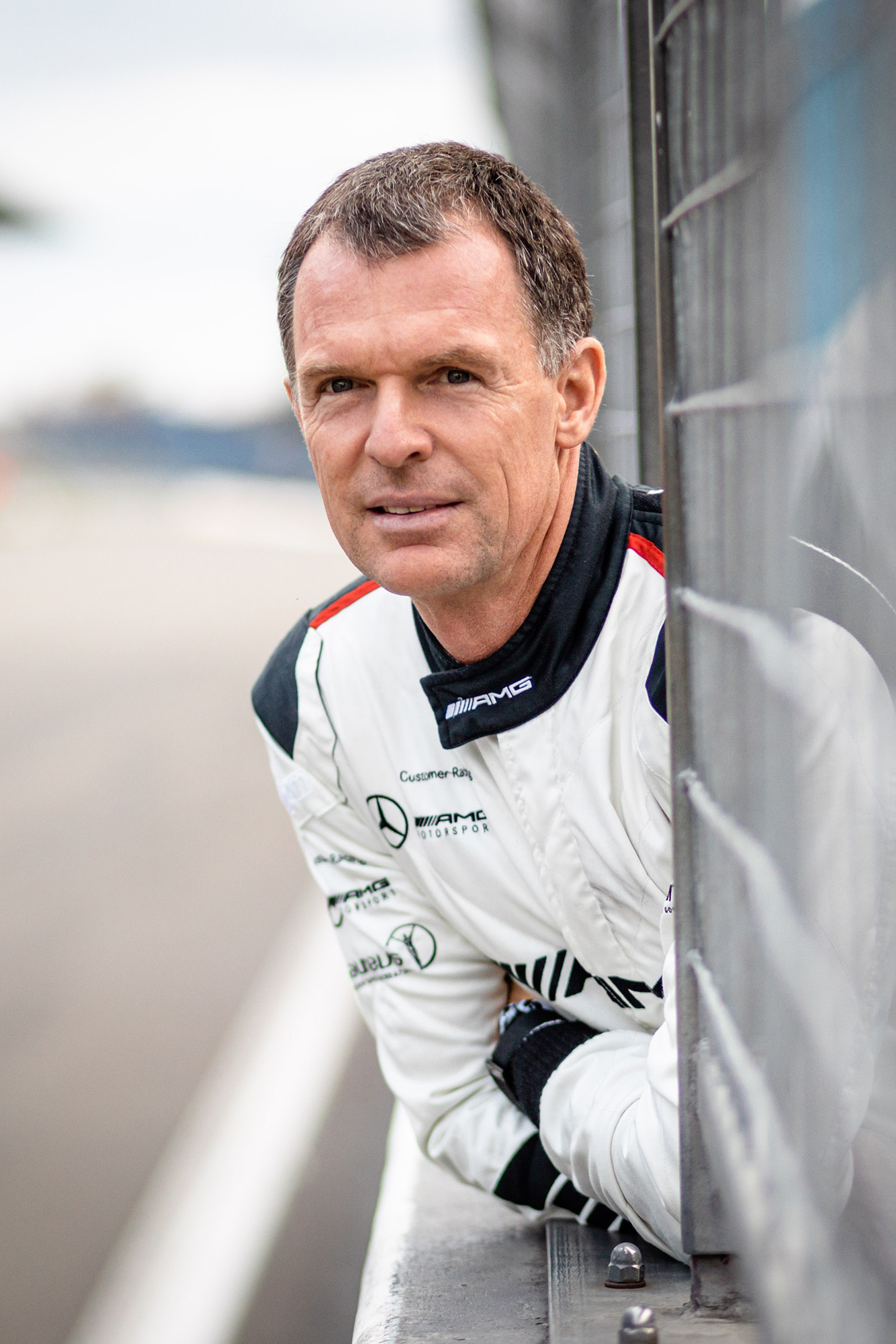
- Haupt in 2021
- Nationality: (Germany) German
- Born: Hubert Horst Hans Haupt; 30 April 1969 (age 57) Munich, West Germany (now Germany)
- Categorisation: FIA Gold (until 2011); FIA Silver (2012–2023); FIA Bronze (2024–)
Medal record
GT3
Representing Germany
FIA Motorsport Games
Gold medal – first place	2024 Valencia	GT Cup

Hubert Horst Hans Haupt (born 30 April 1969) is a German racing driver, team owner, real estate entrepreneur and investor.

He competed in the Deutsche Tourenwagen Meisterschaft in 1991 and 1992 for Audi, and the Deutsche Tourenwagen Masters in 2001 for Opel and in 2021 for Mercedes-AMG. In 1999, he achieved the GT2 class victory at the 24 Hours of Daytona. In 2015, 2018 and 2020, he won the 24 Hours of Dubai. In 2020, he founded Haupt Racing Team.

== Career ==
=== 1989–2000 ===
Haupt began his motorsport career in karting, in which he was active until 1989. In 1990, he switched to touring car racing and drove one season for Opel in the Deutsche Tourenwagen Meisterschaft. He then started in 1991 and 1992 as a works driver for the SMS Schmid Motorsport team with the Audi V8 quattro DTM Evo. In 1991, he achieved his greatest DTM success with third place in the second race on the AVUS. In 1993, he drove a Lola T93/20 formula racing car in the Indy Lights Championship. The following year, when he returned to Germany, he took part in the Porsche Carrera Cup and the Porsche Supercup, finishing in ninth place in the Carrera Cup and seventh place in the Supercup in the annual rankings.

After a four-year break, Haupt started for Roock Racing in the GT2 class of the FIA GT Championship and in the American Le Mans Series (ALMS) in 1999. At the 24 Hours of Daytona he achieved seventh place and the GT2 class victory together with André Ahrlé, Raffaele Sangiuolo and David Warnock in a Porsche 911 GT2 (Type 993). He also took part in the 24 Hours of Le Mans in 1999. However, he and his team colleagues had to end the race early due to engine failure.

The next season, Haupt again drove in the ALMS for Roock Racing. In the FIA GT Championship he started for Freisinger Motorsport. At the race at the Lausitzring, he celebrated his first victory in the FIA GT Championship together with Wolfgang Kaufmann.

=== 2000s ===
In 2001, Haupt drove in the new DTM. There he was only able to finish in the points once with the Opel Astra V8 Coupé for the Opel Euroteam. That year he only took part in an endurance race once with a Porsche 911 GT3 R (type 996) for the Cirtek Motorsport team at the 24 Hours of Daytona, which he was unable to finish due to engine failure. The following year he drove a season in the German V8-Star and finished 20th in the overall ranking. In 2004, he competed in the Mini Challenge Germany for the first time and finished in eleventh place. From 2006 to 2008, he competed there again - but was unable to repeat his 2004 result. In 2005, he competed in a Ferrari 550 GTS Maranello for the Wieth Racing team in the French GT Championship and in a Saleen S7-R for Graham Nash Motorsport in the FIA GT Championship in a few races.

=== 2010s ===
From 2011, Haupt drove a Mercedes-Benz SLS AMG GT3 and from 2016 in the Mercedes-AMG GT3 in various racing championships and events such as the Blancpain Endurance Series, VLN Endurance Championship Nürburgring or endurance races at the Nürburgring, Spa-Francorchamps and Dubai. He mostly started for the Black Falcon racing team.

In 2018, Haupt competed in the Silver Cup class in the Blancpain GT Series together with Abdulaziz Al Faisal and Gabriele Piana, where he finished in second place. In 2020, he finished second in the Silver Cup classification of the GT World Challenge Europe Endurance Cup together with Sergey Afanasyev.

=== 2020s ===
In 2020, Haupt founded his own racing team, the Haupt Racing Team (HRT), which celebrated its first successes in its debut year in the Nürburgring Langstrecken-Serie (formerly VLN), at the 24-hour race at the Nürburgring and in the GT World Challenge Europe. The following year, the Haupt Racing Team entered the DTM and won the drivers' championship with Maximilian Götz.

In 2021, Haupt also started in the DTM at the races at the Nürburgring and the Hockenheimring. This makes Haupt the first driver in history to have started as a driver in every DTM era.

In 2024, Haupt competed in the FIA Motorsport Games GT Cup, alongside Finn Wiebelhaus, where they won the main race.

== Personal life ==
Haupt lives and works in Munich. He is the majority shareholder of a German fitness equipment manufacturer and the owner of a real estate holding company. His son Henri Haupt is a tennis player.
