= 2024 FIA Motorsport Games GT Cup =

Motorsport event

Race details
Date	23–27 October
Official name	FIA Motorsport Games GT Cup
Location	Circuit Ricardo Tormo, Spain
Course	Permanent circuit 4.005 km (2.489 mi)
Distance	Qualifying Race; 60 minutes Main Race; 60 minutes
- Qualifying Race

Pole
Driver	(Germany) Hubert Haupt (Germany) Finn Wiebelhaus	Team Germany

Fastest lap
Driver	(Germany) Finn Wiebelhaus	Team Germany
Time	1:32.937

Podium
First	(United Kingdom) James Cottingham (United Kingdom) Chris Froggatt	Team United Kingdom
Second	(Germany) Hubert Haupt (Germany) Finn Wiebelhaus	Team Germany
Third	(Switzerland) Yannick Mettler (Switzerland) Dexter Müller	Team Switzerland
- Main Race

Pole
Driver	(United Kingdom) James Cottingham (United Kingdom) Chris Froggatt	Team United Kingdom

Fastest lap
Driver	(United Kingdom) Chris Froggatt	Team United Kingdom
Time	1:33.047

Medalists
1st place, gold medalist(s)	(Germany) Hubert Haupt (Germany) Finn Wiebelhaus	Team Germany
2nd place, silver medalist(s)	(United Kingdom) James Cottingham (United Kingdom) Chris Froggatt	Team United Kingdom
3rd place, bronze medalist(s)	(Switzerland) Yannick Mettler (Switzerland) Dexter Müller	Team Switzerland

The 2024 FIA Motorsport Games GT Cup was the third FIA Motorsport Games GT Cup, held at Circuit Ricardo Tormo, Spain on 23 October to 27 October 2024. The race was contested with GT3-spec cars. Only Silver and Bronze drivers were allowed to compete. The event was part of the 2024 FIA Motorsport Games.

== Entry List ==
Team	Entrant	Car	Engine	No.	Drivers
Team Germany	(Germany) Haupt Racing Team	Mercedes-AMG GT3 Evo	Mercedes-AMG M159 6.2 L V8	4	Hubert Haupt
Team Germany	(Germany) Haupt Racing Team	Mercedes-AMG GT3 Evo	Mercedes-AMG M159 6.2 L V8	4	Finn Wiebelhaus
Team Malaysia	(Malaysia) Arrows Racing	Lamborghini Huracán GT3 Evo 2	Lamborghini DGF 5.2 L V10	8	Selim Rafique
Team Malaysia	(Malaysia) Arrows Racing	Lamborghini Huracán GT3 Evo 2	Lamborghini DGF 5.2 L V10	8	Weiron Tan
Team Qatar	(Qatar) QMMF by HRT Performance	Porsche 911 GT3 R (992)	Porsche M97/80 4.2 L Flat-6	10	Ibrahim Ali Al-Abdulghani
Team Qatar	(Qatar) QMMF by HRT Performance	Porsche 911 GT3 R (992)	Porsche M97/80 4.2 L Flat-6	10	Ghanim Salah Al-Maadheed
Team Spain	(Germany) Tresor Attempto Racing	Audi R8 LMS Evo II	Audi DAR 5.2 L V10	19	Jorge Cabezas Catalán
Team Spain	(Germany) Tresor Attempto Racing	Audi R8 LMS Evo II	Audi DAR 5.2 L V10	19	Fernando Navarrete Rodrigo
Team Chinese Taipei	(Chinese Taipei) D2 Racing Team	Mercedes-AMG GT3 Evo	Mercedes-AMG M159 6.2 L V8	22	Kuo Hsin Kuo
Team Chinese Taipei	(Chinese Taipei) D2 Racing Team	Mercedes-AMG GT3 Evo	Mercedes-AMG M159 6.2 L V8	22	Yang Liao
Team Ukraine	(Germany) Land-Motorsport	Audi R8 LMS Evo II	Audi DAR 5.2 L V10	23	Konstantyn Gutsul
Team Ukraine	(Germany) Land-Motorsport	Audi R8 LMS Evo II	Audi DAR 5.2 L V10	23	Ivan Peklin
Team Switzerland	(Germany) SPS Automotive Performance	Mercedes-AMG GT3 Evo	Mercedes-AMG M159 6.2 L V8	54	Yannick Mettler
Team Switzerland	(Germany) SPS Automotive Performance	Mercedes-AMG GT3 Evo	Mercedes-AMG M159 6.2 L V8	54	Dexter Müller
Team Japan	(Italy) AF Corse	Ferrari 296 GT3	Ferrari F163CE 3.0 L Twin Turbo V6	60	Kei Nakanishi
Team Japan	(Italy) AF Corse	Ferrari 296 GT3	Ferrari F163CE 3.0 L Twin Turbo V6	60	Shigekazu Wakisaka
Team Lithuania	(Lithuania) Juta Racing	Audi R8 LMS Evo II	Audi DAR 5.2 L V10	71	Arūnas Gečiauskas
Team Lithuania	(Lithuania) Juta Racing	Audi R8 LMS Evo II	Audi DAR 5.2 L V10	71	Jonas Karklys
Team China	(China) Tianshi Racing Team by CSA Racing	Audi R8 LMS Evo II	Audi DAR 5.2 L V10	75	Kang Ling
Team China	(China) Tianshi Racing Team by CSA Racing	Audi R8 LMS Evo II	Audi DAR 5.2 L V10	75	Yaqi Zhang
Team France	(France) Saintéloc Racing	Audi R8 LMS Evo II	Audi DAR 5.2 L V10	81	Éric Debard
Team France	(France) Saintéloc Racing	Audi R8 LMS Evo II	Audi DAR 5.2 L V10	81	Paul Evrard
Team United Kingdom	(United Kingdom) Sky – Tempesta Racing	Ferrari 296 GT3	Ferrari F163CE 3.0 L Twin Turbo V6	93	James Cottingham
Team United Kingdom	(United Kingdom) Sky – Tempesta Racing	Ferrari 296 GT3	Ferrari F163CE 3.0 L Twin Turbo V6	93	Chris Froggatt

== Results ==
=== Qualifying 1 ===
Pos	No.	Driver	Team	Time	Gap
1	4	Hubert Haupt	Team Germany	1:32.733	—
2	71	Arūnas Gečiauskas	Team Lithuania	1:33.399	+0.666
3	75	Yaqi Zhang	Team China	1:33.887	+1.154
4	93	James Cottingham	Team United Kingdom	1:33.992	+1.259
5	81	Éric Debard	Team France	1:34.025	+1.292
6	23	Konstantyn Gutsul	Team Ukraine	1:34.150	+1.417
7	60	Kei Nakanishi	Team Japan	1:35.034	+2.301
8	54	Dexter Müller	Team Switzerland	1:35.204	+2.471
9	19	Fernando Navarrete Rodrigo	Team Spain	1:35.360	+2.627
10	10	Ibrahim Ali Al-Abdulghani	Team Qatar	1:35.432	+2.699
11	22	Kuo Hsin Kuo	Team Chinese Taipei	1:35.608	+2.875
12	8	Selim Rafique	Team Malaysia	1:38.322	+5.589

=== Qualifying 2 ===
Pos	No.	Driver	Team	Time	Gap
1	4	Finn Wiebelhaus	Team Germany	1:31.924	—
2	93	Chris Froggatt	Team United Kingdom	1:32.004	+0.080
3	54	Yannick Mettler	Team Switzerland	1:32.033	+0.109
4	23	Ivan Peklin	Team Ukraine	1:32.523	+0.599
5	81	Paul Evrard	Team France	1:32.667	+0.743
6	75	Kang Ling	Team China	1:32.765	+0.841
7	71	Jonas Karklys	Team Lithuania	1:32.818	+0.894
8	19	Jorge Cabezas Catalán	Team Spain	1:33.419	+1.495
9	60	Kei Nakanishi	Team Japan	1:33.685	+1.761
10	8	Weiron Tan	Team Malaysia	1:34.073	+2.149
11	10	Ghanim Salah Al-Maadheed	Team Qatar	1:34.617	+2.693
12	22	Yang Liao	Team Chinese Taipei	1:35.809	+3.885

=== Qualifying Race ===
Pos	No.	Driver	Team	Laps	Time/Retired	Grid
1	93	James Cottingham; Chris Froggatt	Team United Kingdom	38	1:00:47.905	2
2	4	Hubert Haupt; Finn Wiebelhaus	Team Germany	38	+ 17.314 ^{1}	1
3	54	Yannick Mettler; Dexter Müller	Team Switzerland	38	+ 36.717	7
4	19	Jorge Cabezas Catalán; Fernando Navarrete Rodrigo	Team Spain	38	+ 40.259	9
5	71	Arūnas Gečiauskas; Jonas Karklys	Team Lithuania	38	+ 51.148 ^{2}	3
6	23	Konstantyn Gutsul; Ivan Peklin	Team Ukraine	38	+ 51.273 ^{1}	5
7	75	Kang Ling; Yaqi Zhang	Team China	38	+ 1:06.830	4
8	81	Éric Debard; Paul Evrard	Team France	38	+ 1:14.251 ^{4}	6
9	10	Ibrahim Al-Abdulghani; Ghanim Salah Al-Maadheed	Team Qatar	37	+ 1 Lap ^{1}	10
10	22	Kuo Hsin Kuo; Yang Liao	Team Chinese Taipei	37	+ 1 Lap ^{3}	11
11	60	Kei Nakanishi; Shigekazu Wakisaka	Team Japan	37	+ 1 Lap	8
12	8	Selim Rafique; Weiron Tan	Team Malaysia	36	+ 2 Laps ^{2}	12
Fastest lap: Finn Wiebelhaus ( Team Germany) – 1:32.937 (Lap 3)

Notes

- ^1 – CARS 4, 10 & 23 - 5 SEC. TIME PENALTY - TRACK LIMITS
- ^2 - CARS 8 & 71 - 10 SEC. TIME PENALTY - TRACK LIMITS
- ^3 – CAR 22 - 15 SEC. TIME PENALTY - TRACK LIMITS
- ^4 - CAR 81 - 25 SEC. TIME PENALTY - TRACK LIMITS

=== Main Race ===
Pos	No.	Driver	Team	Laps	Time/Retired
1st place, gold medalist(s)	4	Hubert Haupt; Finn Wiebelhaus	Team Germany	38	1:00:45.989 ^{2}
2nd place, silver medalist(s)	93	James Cottingham; Chris Froggatt	Team United Kingdom	38	+ 8.560 ^{2} ^{3}
3rd place, bronze medalist(s)	54	Yannick Mettler; Dexter Müller	Team Switzerland	38	+ 17.080
4	19	Jorge Cabezas Catalán; Fernando Navarrete Rodrigo	Team Spain	38	+ 17.900
5	71	Arūnas Gečiauskas; Jonas Karklys	Team Lithuania	38	+ 23.593
6	23	Konstantyn Gutsul; Ivan Peklin	Team Ukraine	38	+ 29.597
7	60	Kei Nakanishi; Shigekazu Wakisaka	Team Japan	38	+ 1:12.842
8	22	Kuo Hsin Kuo; Yang Liao	Team Chinese Taipei	38	+ 1:45.956 ^{6}
9	75	Kang Ling; Yaqi Zhang	Team China	37	+ 1 Lap ^{2} ^{5}
10	10	Ibrahim Al-Abdulghani; Ghanim Salah Al-Maadheed	Team Qatar	37	+ 1 Lap ^{2}
11	8	Selim Rafique; Weiron Tan	Team Malaysia	37	+ 1 Lap
12	81	Éric Debard; Paul Evrard	Team France	37	+ 1 Lap ^{1} ^{2} ^{3} ^{4}
Fastest lap: Chris Froggatt ( Team United Kingdom) – 1:33.047 (Lap 38)

Notes

- ^1 – CAR 81 - 10 SEC. TIME PENALTY - PIT LANE SPEEDING
- ^2 – CARS 4, 10, 75, 81 & 93 - 5 SEC. TIME PENALTY - TRACK LIMITS
- ^3 – CARS 81 & 93 - 10 SEC. TIME PENALTY - TRACK LIMITS
- ^4 – CAR 81 - ANOTHER 30 SEC. TIME PENALTY - TRACK LIMITS
- ^5 – CAR 75 - 5 SEC. TIME PENALTY - GAINING ADVANTAGE OUTSIDE TRACK LIMITS
- ^6 – CAR 22 - DT CONVERTED TO 30 SEC. TIME PENALTY - +2 MECHANICS
