= Chris Froggatt =

British racing driver (born 1993)

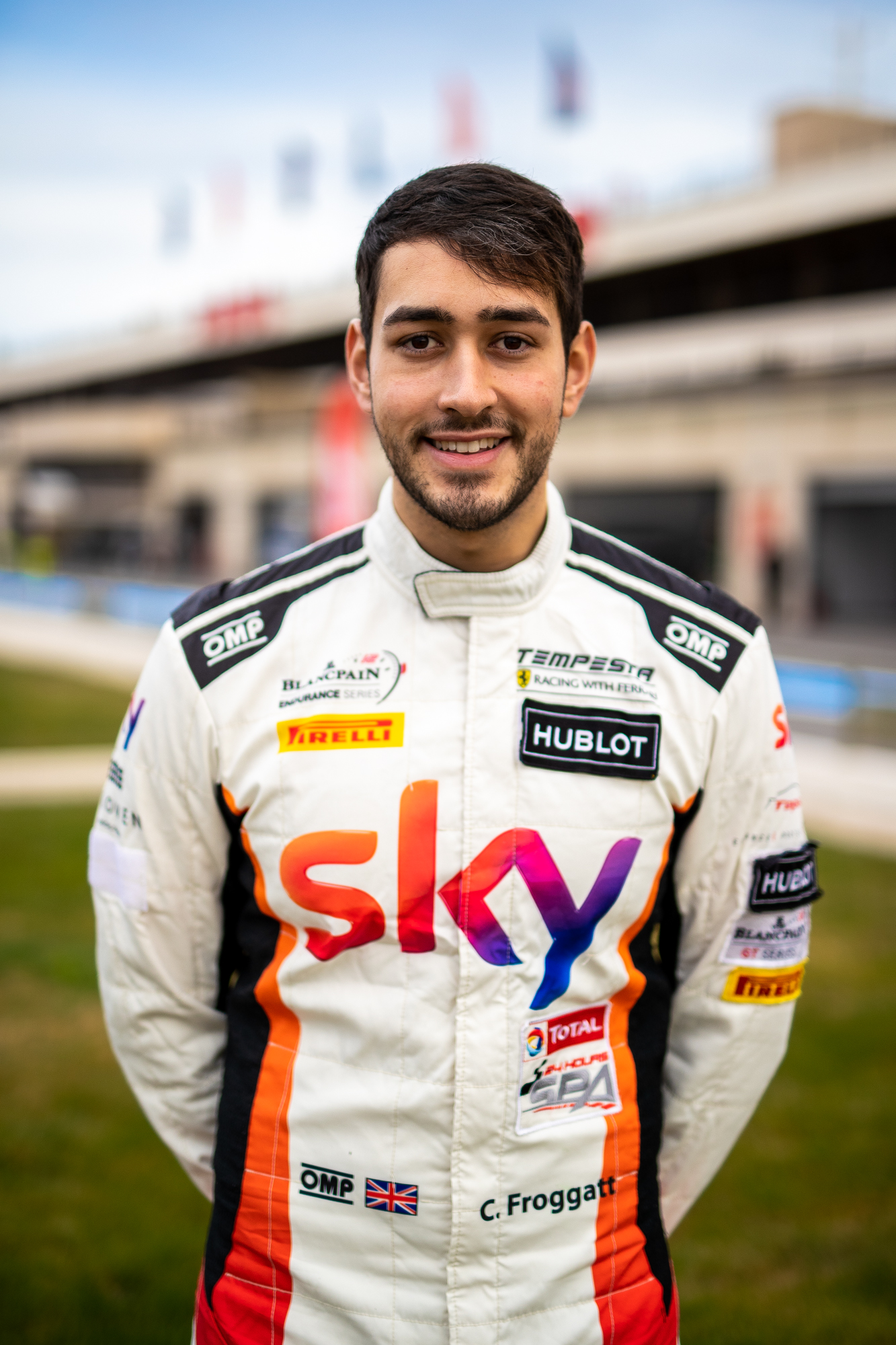
- Froggatt in 2020
- Nationality: (United Kingdom) British
- Born: Christopher Lionel Froggatt; 11 December 1993 (age 32) Windsor, Berkshire, England
- Categorisation: FIA Silver (2017–2026) (Note: In 2020, Froggatt held an FIA Driver Categorisation of Silver, but was reclassified as Bronze by SRO for the 2020 GT World Challenge Europe.); FIA Bronze (2027–)

Championship titles
- 2023-2024 2021 2020 2018: GT World Challenge Europe Endurance Cup – Bronze; GT World Challenge Europe Endurance Cup – Pro-Am; GT World Challenge Europe Sprint Cup – Pro-Am; Ferrari Challenge Europe – Trofeo Pirelli Pro-Am
Medal record
GT3
Representing United Kingdom
FIA Motorsport Games
Silver medal – second place	2024 Valencia	GT Cup

Christopher Lionel Froggatt (born 11 December 1993) is a British racing driver and team owner who last competed in the GT World Challenge Europe Endurance Cup for Ziggo – Tempesta Racing, a team he founded in 2017.

== Career ==
Froggatt began his racing career in 2017, competing for HR Owen in Ferrari Challenge Europe. Racing in the Trofeo Pirelli Pro-Am class, Froggatt won both Silverstone races and race two at the Hungaroring, as well as scoring seven other podiums to finish third in points. Returning to the series for the following year, Froggatt won ten of the 14 races and missed the podium only once to secure the Trofeo Pirelli Pro-Am title in dominant fashion with a round to spare at Barcelona. During 2018, Froggatt also made his debut in GT3 competition, making a one-off appearance in the Italian GT Championship for Ferrari-affiliated AF Corse at Monza, as well as finishing second in the FIA GT Nations Cup.

Having founded Tempesta Racing two years prior, Froggatt and his team joined both the Blancpain GT Series Endurance Cup and International GT Open for their first full season in GT3 machinery in 2019, with support from AF Corse and sponsorship from Sky UK. Racing a Ferrari 488 GT3 in the Pro-Am class of the former alongside Jonathan Hui, Froggatt won at Monza and took a podium at Barcelona en route to a third-place points finish. In the latter, Froggatt raced alongside Eddie Cheever III through the first four rounds, taking a Pro-Am podium at Le Castellet before he and the team left the series. During 2019, Froggatt also made select appearances in Ferrari Challenge Europe for HR Owen, as well as representing the United Kingdom in the GT Cup discipline of the FIA Motorsport Games.

In 2020, Froggatt continued with Sky – Tempesta for a dual campaign in both the GT World Challenge Europe Endurance and Sprint Cups. In the Endurance Cup, Froggatt scored a best result of second in class at Imola and the 24 Hours of Spa, before ending the year with a third-place finish at Le Castellet to secure runner-up honors in Pro-Am. In the latter, Froggatt began the season by winning twice at Misano, before winning both Zandvoort races and race two at Barcelona to seal the Pro-Am title. Froggatt then began the following year by finishing second in the GT3 Pro-Am class and third overall at the Gulf 12 Hours for Mercedes-fielding Ram Racing, before winning the 6 Hours of Abu Dhabi for Audi-linked Car Collection Motorsport. For the rest of the year, Froggatt returned to his AF Corse-run Tempesta Racing for another dual campaign in both the GT World Challenge Europe Endurance and Sprint Cups. Finishing 12th in the Sprint Cup's Silver standings alongside Giorgio Roda, Froggatt found more success in the Endurance Cup, winning at Le Castellet and taking a podium at the Nürburgring to clinch the Pro-Am title.

Froggatt driving his Sky – Tempesta Mercedes around Magny-Cours in 2022.

The following year, Froggatt returned to both Cups, as Sky – Tempesta switched to a Mercedes-AMG GT3 Evo and its now–Gold Cup entry began to be run by GruppeM Racing. Ahead of the 24 Hours of Spa, Haupt Racing Team took over the running of the team's entry for the remainder of the season, in which Froggatt scored his only class podium at Spa en route to an eighth-place points finish in the Gold Cup standings. During 2022, Froggatt and Tempesta also raced in select rounds of the British GT Championship, albeit with support from 2 Seas Motorsport, as well as finishing third in the GT3 Pro-Am class of the Gulf 12 Hours driving a McLaren 720S GT3 in association with Garage 59. Froggatt was also set to represent the United Kingdom in the GT Cup discipline of the FIA Motorsport Games, but was replaced by Sam Neary after feeling unwell ahead of the weekend.

Expanding the Garage 59 alliance for 2023, Froggatt switched to McLaren in the GT World Challenge Europe Endurance Cup, as well as staying in the British GT Championship. In the former, Froggatt scored a best result of second at Monza and the Nürburgring, as well as a pair of third-place finishes at Le Castellet and the 24 Hours of Spa to clinch his maiden Bronze Cup title. Racing in the GT3 Silver-Am class of the latter, Froggatt won the first Donington Park race, both Snetterton races and finished on the podium in the remaining six races to secure runner-up honors in class. Towards the end of the year, Froggatt and Sky – Tempesta switched back to Ferrari machinery to race in both the Indianapolis 8 Hours and the Gulf 12 Hours.

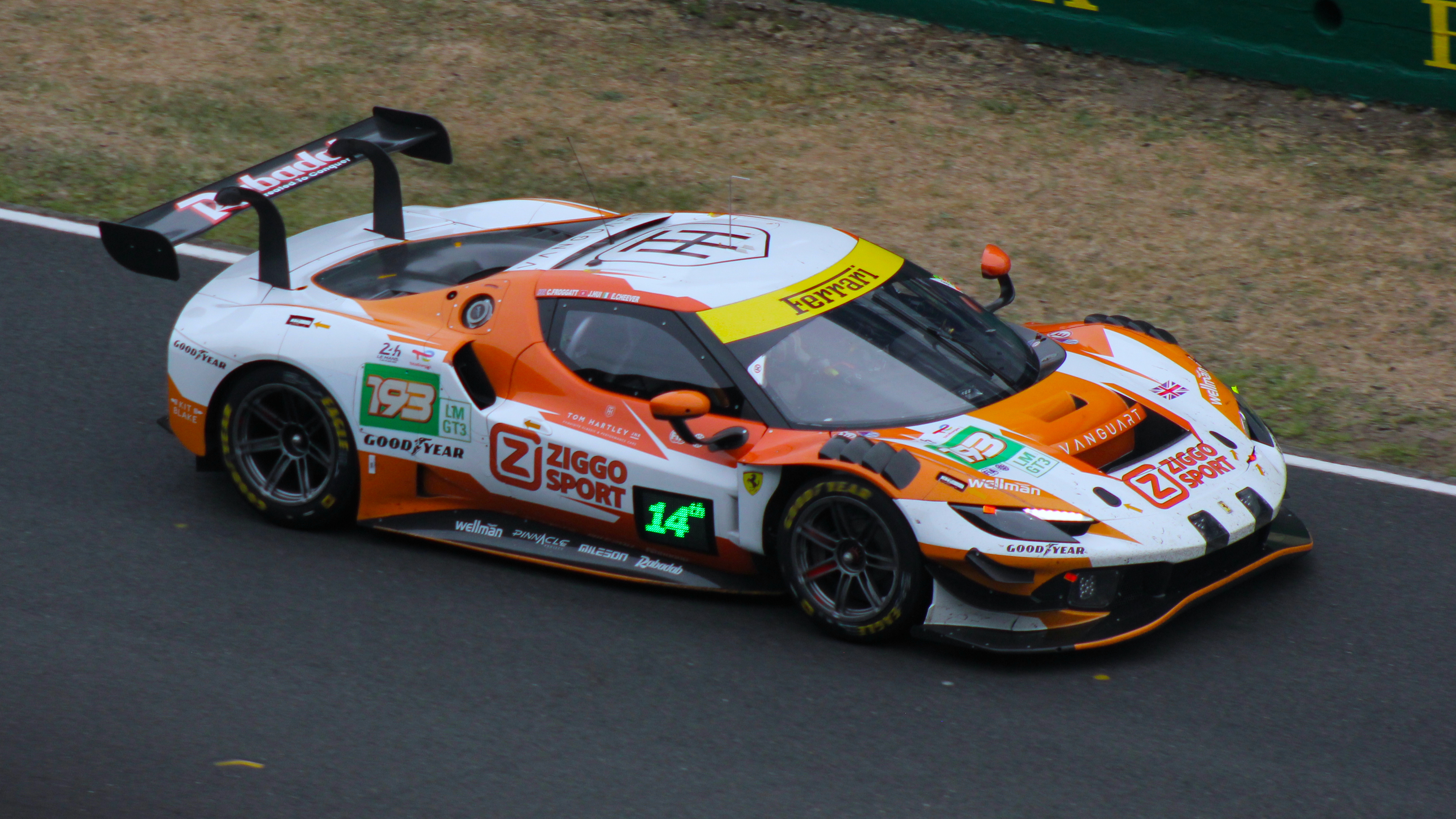
Froggatt at the wheel of his Ziggo Sport – Tempesta Ferrari at the 2025 24 Hours of Le Mans.

Returning under AF Corse's wing for 2024, Froggatt primarily raced in the GT World Challenge Europe Endurance Cup, where he scored a best result of fourth three times to seal his second consecutive Bronze Cup title, earning Tempesta an invitation to the following year's 24 Hours of Le Mans. During 2024, Froggatt also represented the United Kingdom in the GT Cup discipline of the FIA Motorsport Games, in which he scored a silver medal. The following year saw the team ink a branding deal with Dutch Ziggo Sport, with Froggatt racing an AF Corse–run Ferrari 296 GT3 in the GT World Challenge Europe Endurance Cup and making his 24 Hours of Le Mans debut in the LMGT3 class. During 2025, Froggatt also finished second overall at the Gulf 12 Hours for Ferrari-fielding AlManar by Dragon Racing, and won the 12 Hours of Spa-Francorchamps driving a Porsche 911 GT3 R (992).

Froggatt began 2026 with third in the Bronze class of the Bathurst 12 Hour in cooperation with Ferrari-linked Arise Racing GT, before Ziggo – Tempesta partnered up with Porsche and Herberth Motorsport for its eighth season in the GT World Challenge Europe Endurance Cup.

== Personal life ==
On 7 August 2026, Froggatt married Princess Ilyana Alia of Pahang, the daughter of Sultan Abdullah of Pahang and Julia Rais, in Kuala Lumpur, Malaysia.

== Racing record ==
=== Racing career summary ===
Season	Series	Team	Races	Wins	Poles	F/Laps	Podiums	Points	Position
2017	Ferrari Challenge Europe – Trofeo Pirelli Pro-Am	HR Owen	14	3	4	3	10	177.5	**3rd**
2017	Finali Mondiali – Trofeo Pirelli Pro-Am	HR Owen	1	0	0	0	0	—N/a	8th
2018	Ferrari Challenge Europe – Trofeo Pirelli Pro-Am	HR Owen	14	10	4	7	13	273	**1st**
2018	Finali Mondiali – Trofeo Pirelli Pro-Am	HR Owen	1	0	0	0	0	—N/a	4th
2018	Italian GT Championship – GT3	AF Corse	1	0	0	0	0	0	NC
2018	FIA GT Nations Cup	Team United Kingdom	1	0	0	0	1	—N/a	**2nd**
2019	Blancpain GT Series Endurance Cup	Tempesta Racing	5	0	0	0	0	0	NC
2019	Blancpain GT Series Endurance Cup – Pro-Am	Tempesta Racing	5	1	0	0	2	86	**3rd**
2019	International GT Open – Pro-Am	Tempesta Racing	8	0	0	0	1	23	11th
2019	FIA Motorsport Games GT Cup	Team UK	1	0	0	0	0	—N/a	15th
2019	Ferrari Challenge Europe – Trofeo Pirelli Pro	HR Owen	4	0	0	0	0	20	10th
2019	Finali Mondiali – Trofeo Pirelli Pro	HR Owen	1	0	0	0	0	—N/a	7th
2020	GT World Challenge Europe Endurance Cup	Sky - Tempesta Racing	4	0	0	0	0	0	NC
2020	GT World Challenge Europe Endurance Cup – Pro-Am	Sky - Tempesta Racing	4	0	2	0	3	79	**2nd**
2020	GT World Challenge Europe Sprint Cup	Sky - Tempesta Racing	10	0	0	0	0	1	22nd
2020	GT World Challenge Europe Sprint Cup – Pro-Am	Sky - Tempesta Racing	10	5	5	2	8	131	**1st**
2020	Le Mans Cup – GT3	Sky - Tempesta Racing	2	0	0	0	0	0	NC†
2020	Intercontinental GT Challenge	Sky - Tempesta Racing	1	0	0	0	0	0	NC
2021	Gulf 12 Hours – GT3 Pro-Am	Ram Racing	1	0	0	0	1	—N/a	**2nd**
2021	6 Hours of Abu Dhabi – GT	Car Collection Motorsport	1	1	0	0	1	—N/a	**1st**
2021	GT World Challenge Europe Endurance Cup	Sky - Tempesta Racing	5	0	0	0	0	0	NC
2021	GT World Challenge Europe Endurance Cup – Pro-Am	Sky - Tempesta Racing	5	1	2	0	2	101	**1st**
2021	GT World Challenge Europe Sprint Cup	Sky - Tempesta Racing	10	0	0	0	0	0	NC
2021	GT World Challenge Europe Sprint Cup – Silver	Sky - Tempesta Racing	10	0	0	0	0	22	12th
2021	Intercontinental GT Challenge	Sky - Tempesta Racing	1	0	0	0	0	0	NC
2022	GT World Challenge Europe Endurance Cup	Sky - Tempesta with GruppeM Racing	2	0	0	0	0	0	NC
2022	GT World Challenge Europe Endurance Cup	Sky - Tempesta Racing by HRT	3	0	0	0	0	0	NC
2022	GT World Challenge Europe Endurance Cup – Gold	Sky - Tempesta with GruppeM Racing	2	0	2	0	0	35	8th
2022	GT World Challenge Europe Endurance Cup – Gold	Sky - Tempesta Racing by HRT	3	0	0	0	1	35	8th
2022	GT World Challenge Europe Sprint Cup	Sky - Tempesta with GruppeM Racing	8	0	0	0	0	0.5	23rd
2022	GT World Challenge Europe Sprint Cup	Sky - Tempesta Racing by HRT	2	0	0	0	0	0.5	23rd
2022	GT World Challenge Europe Sprint Cup – Silver	Sky - Tempesta with GruppeM Racing	8	0	0	0	0	38.5	8th
2022	GT World Challenge Europe Sprint Cup – Silver	Sky - Tempesta Racing by HRT	2	0	0	0	0	38.5	8th
2022	Intercontinental GT Challenge	Sky - Tempesta Racing by HRT	1	0	0	0	0	0	NC
2022	British GT Championship – GT3 Silver	Sky - Tempesta Racing	4	0	0	0	0	0	NC†
2022	Gulf 12 Hours – GT3 Pro-Am	Sky - Tempesta with Garage 59	1	0	0	0	1	—N/a	**3rd**
2023	GT World Challenge Europe Endurance Cup	Sky – Tempesta Racing	5	0	0	0	0	0	NC
2023	GT World Challenge Europe Endurance Cup – Bronze	Sky – Tempesta Racing	5	0	0	0	4	92	**1st**
2023	British GT Championship – GT3 Silver	Sky – Tempesta Racing	9	3	1	0	9	219.5	**2nd**
2023	Intercontinental GT Challenge	Sky – Tempesta Racing	2	0	0	0	0	0	NC
2023	Intercontinental GT Challenge	Sky – Tempesta Racing	1	0	0	0	0	0	NC
2023	GT World Challenge America – Pro	Sky – Tempesta Racing	1	0	0	0	0	0	NC†
2023	Gulf 12 Hours – GT3 Pro-Am	Sky – Tempesta Racing	1	0	0	0	0	—N/a	6th
2024	GT World Challenge Europe Endurance Cup	Sky - Tempesta Racing	5	0	0	0	0	6	25th
2024	GT World Challenge Europe Endurance Cup – Bronze	Sky - Tempesta Racing	5	0	0	0	0	74	**1st**
2024	British GT Championship – GT3 Silver-Am	Sky - Tempesta Racing	0	0	0	0	0	0	NC
2024	FIA Motorsport Games GT Cup	Team United Kingdom	1	0	0	1	1	—N/a	**2nd**
2025	GT World Challenge Europe Endurance Cup	Ziggo Sport – Tempesta	3	0	0	0	0	0	NC
2025	GT World Challenge Europe Endurance Cup – Bronze	Ziggo Sport – Tempesta	3	0	0	0	0	15	26th
2025	24 Hours of Le Mans – LMGT3	Ziggo Sport – Tempesta	1	0	0	0	0	—N/a	14th
2025	Intercontinental GT Challenge	Ziggo Sport – Tempesta	1	0	0	0	0	0	NC
2025	24H Series – GT3	Ziggo Sport - Tempesta Racing	1	1	0	0	1	40	NC
2025	Gulf 12 Hours	AlManar by Dragon Racing	1	0	0	0	1	—N/a	**2nd**
2026	Bathurst 12 Hour – Bronze	Ziggo Sport Tempesta by ARGT	1	0	0	0	1	—N/a	**3rd**
2026	Intercontinental GT Challenge	Ziggo Sport Tempesta by ARGT	1	0	0	0	0	2	29th
2026	Intercontinental GT Challenge	Ziggo Sport – Tempesta Racing	2	0	0	0	0	2	29th
2026	GT World Challenge Europe Endurance Cup	Ziggo Sport – Tempesta Racing	5	0	0	0	0	0	NC
2026	GT World Challenge Europe Endurance Cup – Bronze	Ziggo Sport – Tempesta Racing	5	0	0	0	0	31	14th

^{†} As Froggatt was a guest driver, he was ineligible to score points.

=== Complete GT World Challenge Europe results ===
==== GT World Challenge Europe Endurance Cup ====
(Races in bold indicate pole position) (Races in italics indicate fastest lap)

Year	Team	Car	Class	1	2	3	4	5	6	7	Pos.	Points
2019	Tempesta Racing	Ferrari 488 GT3	Pro-Am	MON; 20	SIL; 27	LEC; 33	SPA; 6H; 38	SPA; 12H; 37	SPA; 24H; 40	CAT; 16	3rd	86
2020	Sky – Tempesta Racing	Ferrari 488 GT3	Pro-Am	**IMO**; 23	NÜR; 32	SPA; 6H; 21	SPA; 12H; 19	SPA; 24H; 17	**LEC**; 24		2nd	79
2021	Sky – Tempesta Racing	Ferrari 488 GT3 Evo 2020	Pro-Am	MON; 30	LEC; 21	SPA; 6H; 27	SPA; 12H; 18	SPA; 24H; 19	**NÜR**; 22	**CAT**; 28	1st	101
2022	Sky – Tempesta with GruppeM Racing	Mercedes-AMG GT3 Evo	Gold	IMO; 35	LEC; Ret						8th	35
2022	Sky – Tempesta Racing by HRT	Mercedes-AMG GT3 Evo	Gold			SPA; 6H; 32	SPA; 12H; 36	SPA; 24H; 26	HOC; 32	CAT; 37	8th	35
2023	Sky – Tempesta Racing	McLaren 720S GT3 Evo	Bronze	MNZ; 17	LEC; 18	SPA; 6H; 32	SPA; 12H; 14	SPA; 24H; 18	NÜR; 23	CAT; 27	1st	92
2024	Sky – Tempesta Racing	Ferrari 296 GT3	Bronze	LEC; 25	SPA; 6H; 4	SPA; 12H; 12	SPA; 24H; 16	NÜR; 33	MNZ; 12	JED; 28	1st	74
2025	Ziggo Sport - Tempesta	Ferrari 296 GT3	Bronze	LEC; 48	MNZ; 37	SPA; 6H; 37	SPA; 12H; 25	SPA; 24H; 50†	NÜR	CAT; 39	26th	15
2026	Ziggo Sport - Tempesta Racing	Porsche 911 GT3 R (992.2)	Bronze	LEC; 49†	MNZ; 15	SPA; 6H; 20	SPA; 12H; 57†	SPA; 24H; Ret	NÜR; 31	ALG; Ret	14th	31

==== GT World Challenge Europe Sprint Cup ====
(key) (Races in bold indicate pole position) (Races in italics indicate fastest lap)

Year	Team	Car	Class	1	2	3	4	5	6	7	8	9	10	Pos.	Points
2020	Sky – Tempesta Racing	Ferrari 488 GT3	Pro-Am	MIS; 1; 11	**MIS**; **2**; 14	MIS; 3; 11	**MAG**; **1**; 15	MAG; 2; 14	ZAN; 1; 9	ZAN; 2; 12	**CAT**; **1**; 20	**CAT**; **2**; 13	**CAT**; **3** Ret	1st	131
2021	Sky – Tempesta Racing	Ferrari 488 GT3 Evo 2020	Silver	MAG; 1; 20	MAG; 2; 14	ZAN; 1; 19	ZAN; 2; 23	MIS; 1; 19	MIS; 2; 22	BRH; 1; 26	BRH; 2; 22	VAL; 1; 15	VAL; 2; 17	12th	22
2022	Sky – Tempesta with GruppeM Racing	Mercedes-AMG GT3 Evo	Silver	BRH; 1; 17	BRH; 2; 20	MAG; 1; 19	MAG; 2; 15	ZAN; 1; 22	ZAN; 2; 17	MIS; 1; 21	MIS; 2; 14			8th	38.5
2022	Sky – Tempesta Racing by HRT	Mercedes-AMG GT3 Evo	Silver									VAL; 1; 11	VAL; 2; 10	8th	38.5

=== Complete International GT Open results ===
(key) (Races in bold indicate pole position; results in italics indicate fastest lap)

Year	Entrant	Chassis	Class	1	2	3	4	5	6	7	8	9	10	11	12	13	14	Rank	Points
2019	Tempesta Racing	Ferrari 488 GT3	Pro-Am	LEC; 1 Ret	LEC; 2; 3	HOC; 1; 4	HOC; 2; 5	SPA; 1; 5	SPA; 2; 5	RBR; 1; 6	RBR; 2; 6	SIL; 1	SIL; 2	CAT; 1	CAT; 2	MNZ; 1	MNZ; 2	11th	23

=== Complete British GT Championship results ===
(key) (Races in bold indicate pole position) (Races in italics indicate fastest lap)

Year	Team	Car	Class	1	2	3	4	5	6	7	8	9	DC	Points
2022	Sky - Tempesta Racing	Mercedes-AMG GT3 Evo	GT3 Silver-Am	OUL; 1; 12	OUL; 2; 5	SIL; 10	DON1	SNE; 1	SNE; 2	SPA	BRH; 20	DON2	NC†	0†
2023	Sky - Tempesta Racing	McLaren 720S GT3 Evo	GT3 Silver-Am	**OUL**; **1**; 13	OUL; 2; 15	SIL; 12	DON1; 6	SNE; 1; 4	SNE; 2; 8	ALG; 9	BRH; 10	DON2; 12	2nd	219.5
2024	Sky - Tempesta Racing	Ferrari 296 GT3	GT3 Silver-Am	OUL; 1	OUL; 2	SIL; WD	DON1	SPA	SNE; 1	SNE; 2	DON2	BRH	NC	0

=== Complete 24 Hours of Le Mans results ===
Year	Team	Co-Drivers	Car	Class	Laps	Pos.	Class Pos.
2025	(United Kingdom) Ziggo Sport – Tempesta	(Italy) Eddie Cheever III (Hong Kong) Jonathan Hui	Ferrari 296 GT3	LMGT3	335	46th	14th
