= James Cottingham =

British racing driver

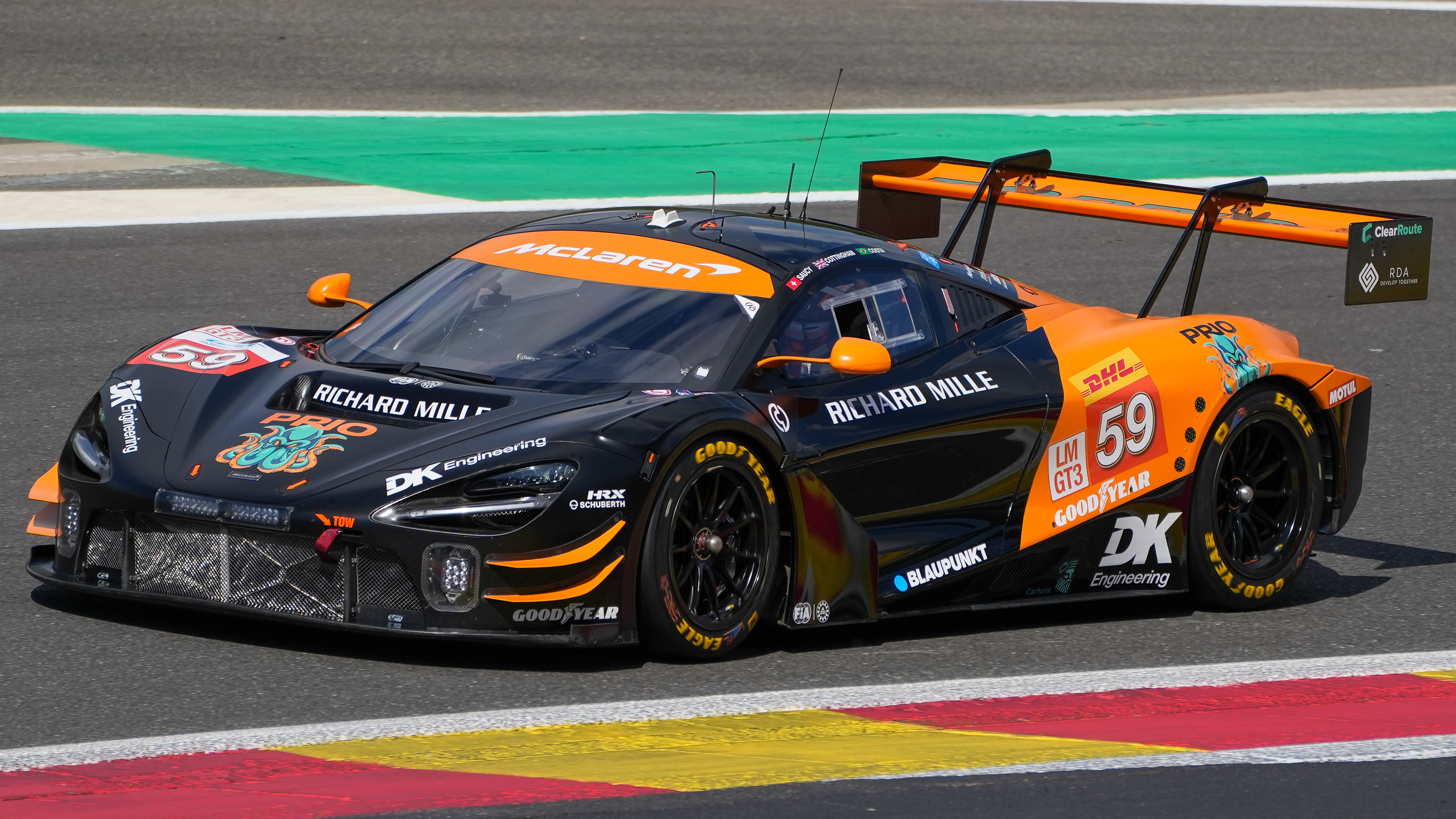
- Cottingham driving the #59 McLaren 720S GT3 at the 2024 6 Hours of Spa-Francorchamps
- Nationality: (United Kingdom) British
- Born: James Roderick Cottingham; 21 January 1984 (age 42) Hertfordshire, England

FIA World Endurance Championship career
- Debut season: 2024
- Categorisation: FIA Silver (until 2016); FIA Bronze (2017–)
- Car number: 59
- Former teams: United Autosports
- Starts: 11
- Wins: 0
- Podiums: 1
- Poles: 0
- Fastest laps: 0
- Best finish: 2nd in 2025

Previous series
- 2021-23: British GT Championship
Medal record
GT3
Representing United Kingdom
FIA Motorsport Games
Silver medal – second place	2024 Valencia	GT Cup

James Roderick Cottingham (born 21 January 1984) is a British businessman and racing driver who currently competes in the FIA World Endurance Championship for Manthey Racing in the current 2026 season. He was the 2023 British GT Championship runner-up. In addition to being a racing driver, Cottingham is also a director of DK Engineering, a car restoration company founded by his family in 1977.

== Career ==
In February 2024, United Autosports announced Cottingham would race one of the team's McLaren 720S GT3 Evo cars in the 2024 FIA World Endurance Championship alongside Grégoire Saucy and Nicolas Costa. Cottingham competed in the 2024 FIA Motorsport Games GT Cup, alongside Chris Froggatt, where they won the silver medal in the main race.

== Racing record ==
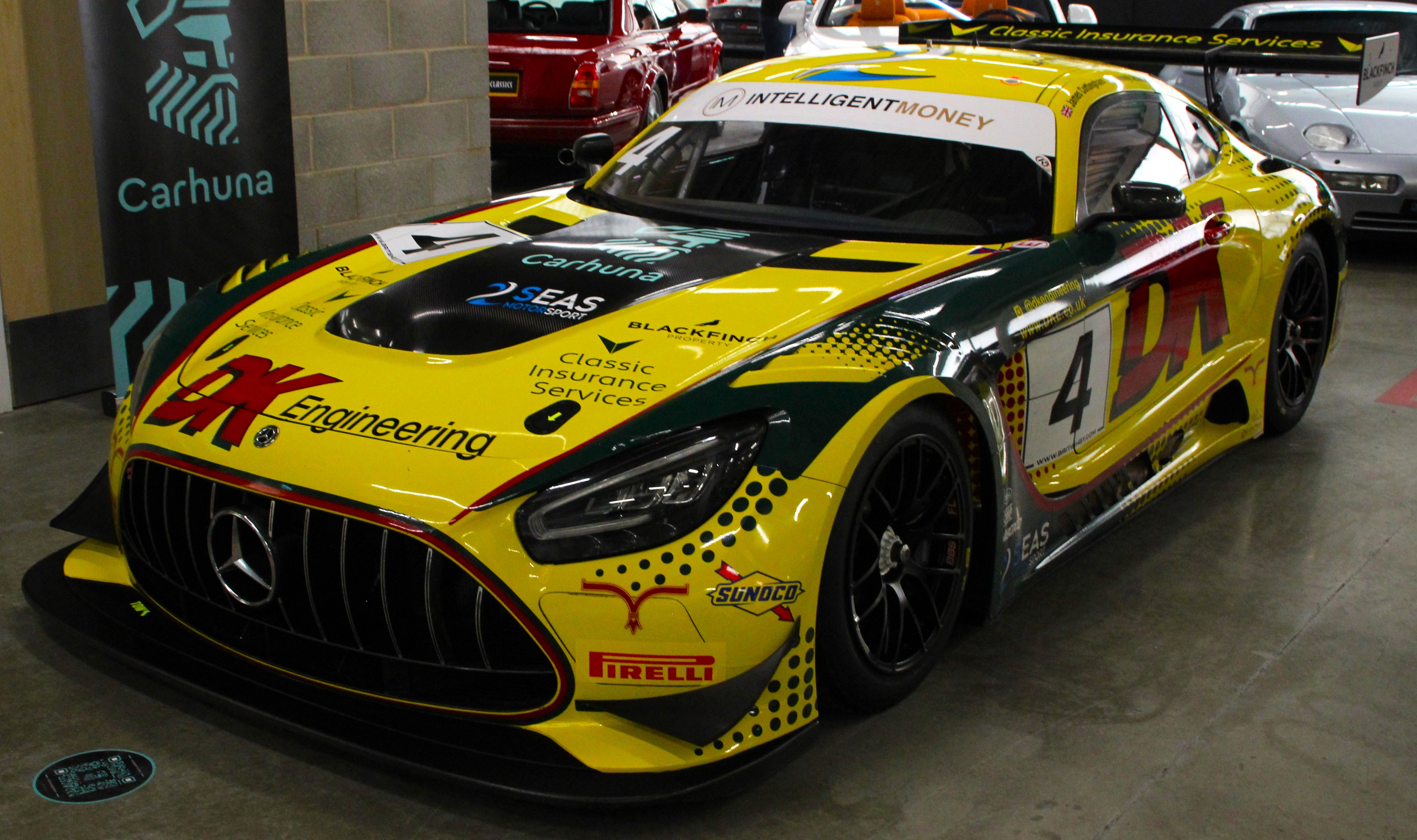
2 Seas Motorsport Mercedes-AMG GT3 Evo which was driven by Cottingham and Lewis Williamson in the 2022 British GT Championship.

=== Complete British GT Championship results ===
Year	Team	Car	Class	1	2	3	4	5	6	7	8	9	DC	Points
2021	Ram Racing	Mercedes-AMG GT3 Evo	GT3	BRH; 1 Ret	SIL; 2; 8	DON; 1	SPA; 1	SNE; 1	SNE; 2	OUL; 1	OUL; 2	DON; 1	13th	15
2022	2 Seas Motorsport	Mercedes-AMG GT3 Evo	GT3	OUL; 1; 5	OUL; 2 Ret	SIL; 1 Ret	DON; 1; 2	SNE; 1; 4	SNE; 2; 7	SPA; 1; 2	**BRH**; **1**; 4	DON; 1; 9	4th	114
2023	2 Seas Motorsport	Mercedes-AMG GT3 Evo	GT3	**OUL**; **1**; 1	OUL; 2; 4	SIL; 1; 11	DON; 1; 1	SNE; 1; 6	SNE; 2; 2	ALG; 1; 1	**BRH**; **1**; 3	DON; 1; 10	2nd	163.5

=== Asian Le Mans Series ===
2023–24 Asian Le Mans Series

=== Complete FIA World Endurance Championship results ===
(key) (Races in bold indicate pole position) (Races in italics indicate fastest lap)

Year	Entrant	Class	Car	Engine	1	2	3	4	5	6	7	8	Rank	Points
2024	United Autosports	LMGT3	McLaren 720S GT3 Evo	McLaren M840T 4.0 L Turbo V8	QAT; 14	IMO; 11	SPA; 4	LMS; 18	SÃO; 4	COA; 4	FUJ; 8	BHR; 6	9th	52
2025	United Autosports	LMGT3	McLaren 720S GT3 Evo	McLaren M840T 4.0 L Turbo V8	QAT; 2	IMO; 14	SPA; 15	LMS; Ret	SÃO; 8	COA; 4	FUJ; 14	BHR; 16	12th	43
2026	Manthey DK Engineering	LMGT3	Porsche 911 GT3 R (992.2)	Porsche M97/80 4.2 L Flat-6	IMO; 4	SPA; 7	LMS; Ret	SÃO; 4	COA; 2	FUJ; 7	CAT; 16	MNZ; 5	11th	64

|* Season still in progress

=== Complete 24 Hours of Le Mans results ===
Year	Team	Co-Drivers	Car	Class	Laps	Pos.	Class Pos.
2024	(United Kingdom) United Autosports	(Brazil) Nicolas Costa (Switzerland) Grégoire Saucy	McLaren 720S GT3 Evo	LMGT3	220	DNF	DNF
2025	(United Kingdom) United Autosports	(France) Sébastien Baud (Switzerland) Grégoire Saucy	McLaren 720S GT3 Evo	LMGT3	314	DNF	DNF
2026	(Germany) Manthey DK Engineering	Timur Boguslavskiy (Turkey) Ayhancan Güven	Porsche 911 GT3 R (992.2)	LMGT3	254	DNF	DNF
