= Ayhancan Güven =

Turkish racing driver (born 1998)

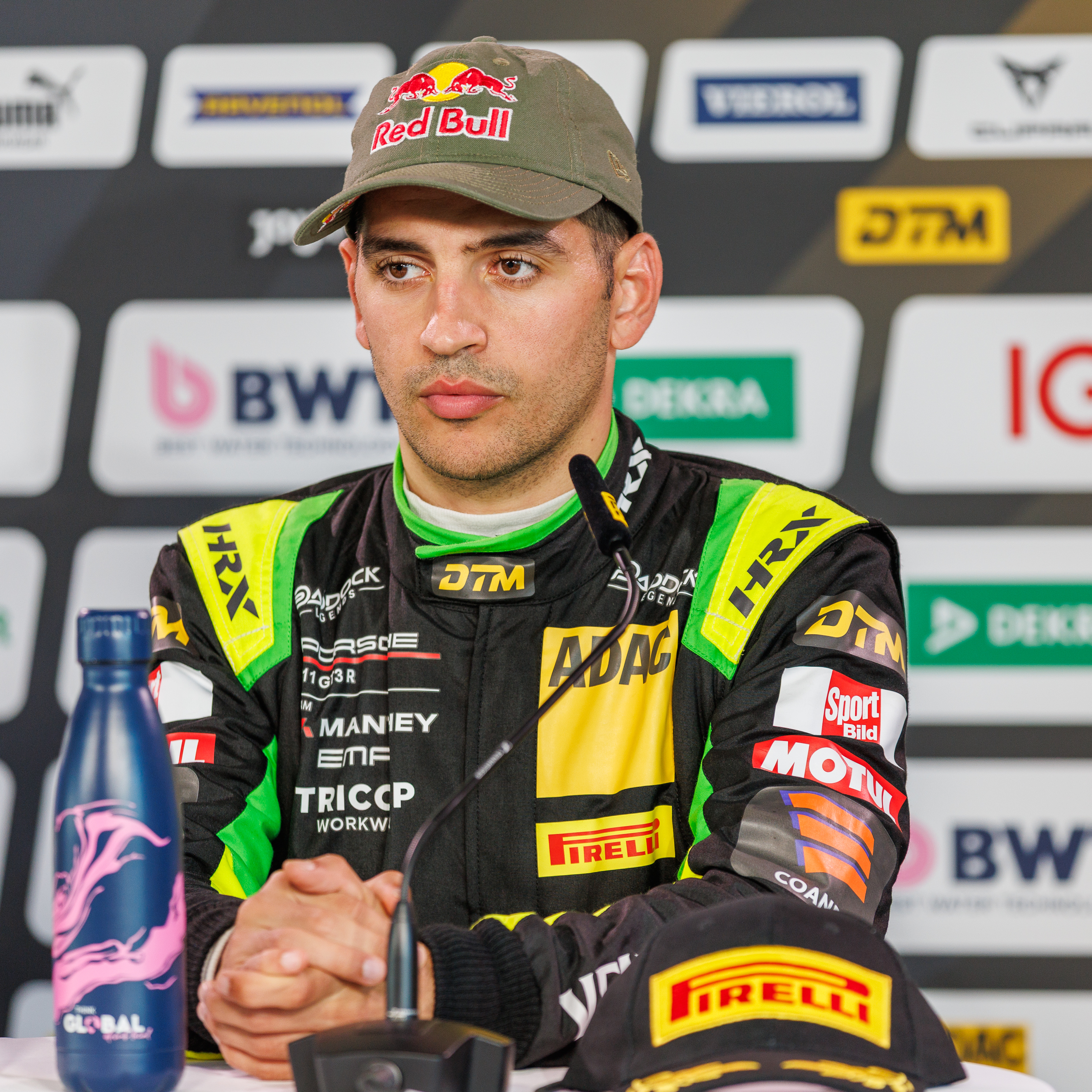
- Güven in 2025
- Nationality: (Turkey) Turkish
- Born: 2 January 1998 (age 28) Istanbul, Turkey

DTM career
- Debut season: 2022
- Current team: Manthey EMA
- Categorisation: FIA Silver (until 2021); FIA Gold (2022–2023); FIA Platinum (2024–)
- Car number: 90
- Former teams: KÜS Team Bernhard (2023)
- Starts: 50
- Championships: 1
- Wins: 5
- Podiums: 7
- Poles: 0
- Fastest laps: 5
- Best finish: 1st in 2025

Previous series
- 2023 2022 2019–2021 2018, 2021 2018–2020 2018: Asian Le Mans Series; ADAC GT Masters; Porsche Supercup; Porsche Carrera Cup Germany; Porsche Carrera Cup France; FIA GT Nations Cup

Championship titles
- 2025 2023 2019 2018: DTM; Asian Le Mans Series; Porsche Carrera Cup France; Porsche Carrera Cup France
Medal record
GT3
Representing Turkey
FIA Motorsport Games
Gold medal – first place	2024 Valencia	GT Sprint

Ayhancan Güven (Turkish: [ˈajhan.dʒan ˈɟyven], born 2 January 1998) is a Turkish racing driver and a Porsche factory driver, currently competing in the 2026 FIA World Endurance Championship for the Manthey Racing team. He has previously raced in the Deutsche Tourenwagen Masters (DTM), where he was crowned champion in the 2025 season.

Born in 1998 in Istanbul, Güven was introduced to racing at four years old by his father, beginning his career with kart racing and later sim racing as a member of the sim racing team Coanda Esports. The success in these different categories helped him move up to GT Racing and Endurance racing.

== Career ==
Güven finished the 2018 season of the Porsche Carrera Cup France as champion. He repeated as champion in the next season of the Porsche Carrera Cup France in 2019. Also in 2018 he won the FIA GT Nations Cup, representing his home country alongside Salih Yoluç. The event was the predecessor to the FIA Motorsport Games.

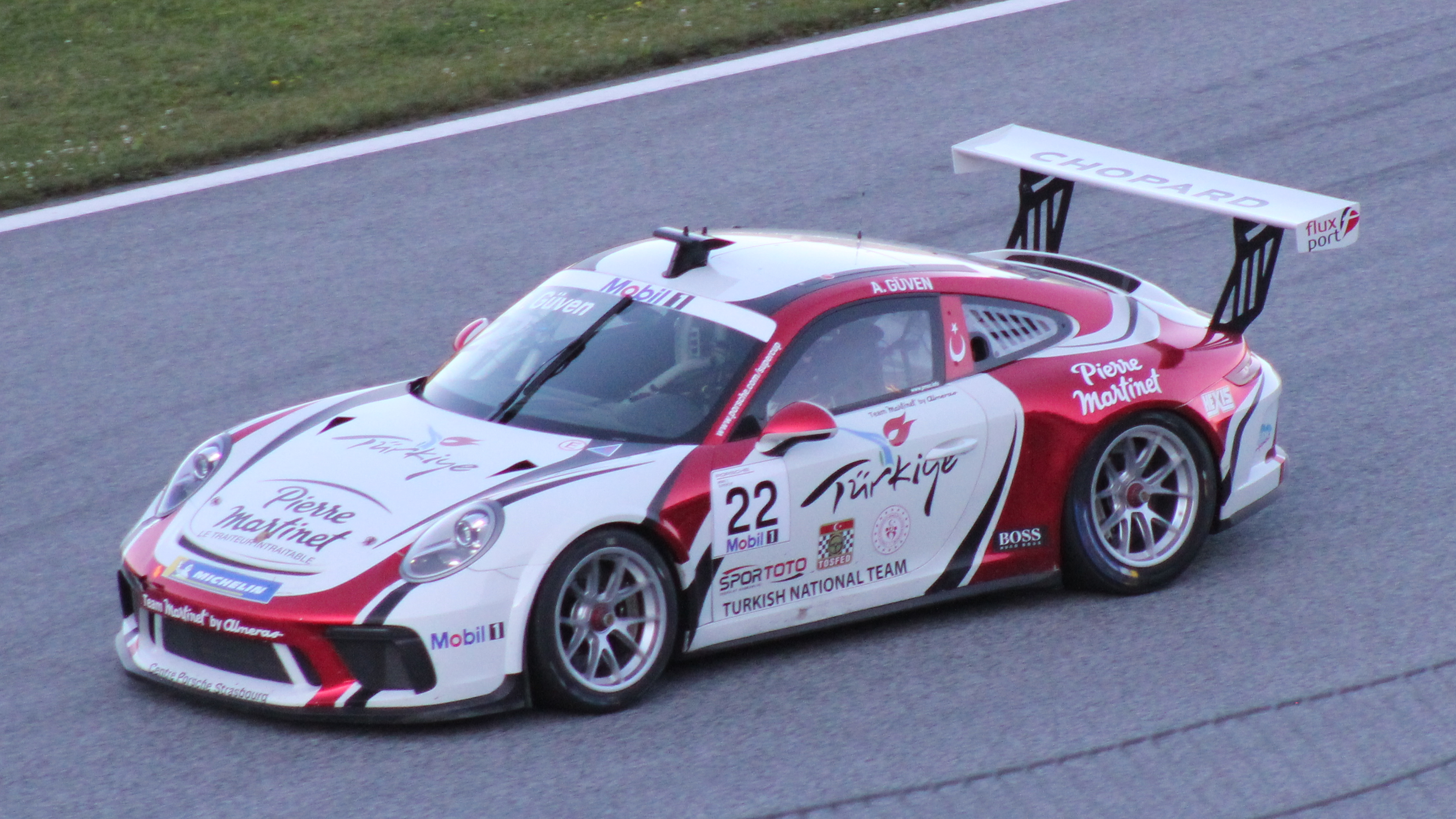
Güven during the race weekend of 2019 Porsche Supercup Austria at the Red Bull Ring in Spielberg.

Güven won the fourth round of the 2019 Porsche Supercup in Silverstone Circuit starting from pole position. He was named the Junior 2020 Porsche Motorsport, and finished 2020 season as third with 113 points. For the 2021 season, he signed with BWT Lechner Racing.

In 2022, Güven competed with Christian Engelhart in Team Joos Sportwagentechnik in ADAC GT Masters and finished runner-up in the standings.

For 2023, Güven moved up to the Deutsche Tourenwagen Masters, where he would record one podium finish at the Sachsenring.

In 2024, Güven won the Bathurst 12 Hour endurance race alongside Matthew Campbell and Laurens Vanthoor for Manthey Racing, the team he also signed to drive for in the 2024 Deutsche Tourenwagen Masters.

== Formula E ==
=== Fusion (2027−present) ===
==== 2026–27 season ====
In November 2026, Güven tested for Fusion Formula E Team for the 2026–27 Formula E pre-season testing at Jarama.

== Racing record ==
=== Career summary ===
Season	Series	Team	Races	Wins	Poles	F/Laps	Podiums	Points	Position
2017	Porsche Carrera Cup France	Toksport WRT	7	0	0	0	1	112	6th
2017	Porsche GT3 Cup Challenge Benelux	Toksport WRT	9	4	5	3	5	138	4th
2018	Porsche Carrera Cup Germany	MSG / HRT Motorsport	4	0	0	0	0	0	NC†
2018	Porsche Carrera Cup France	Attempto Racing	6	1	0	3	6	200	**1st**
2018	Porsche GT3 Cup Challenge Benelux	Attempto Racing	12	7	9	10	9	243	**1st**
2018	FIA GT Nations Cup	Team Turkey	3	2	0	1	3	N/A	**1st**
2019	Porsche Carrera Cup France	Martinet by Alméras	12	5	6	4	10	207	**1st**
2019	Porsche Supercup	Martinet by Alméras	10	1	1	0	5	124	**2nd**
2019	FIA Motorsport Games GT Cup	Team Turkey	3	0	0	0	0	N/A	12th
2020	Porsche Carrera Cup France	Martinet by Alméras	10	3	1	1	6	166	**2nd**
2020	Porsche Supercup	Martinet by Alméras	8	2	3	0	4	113	**3rd**
2021	Porsche Carrera Cup Germany	Phoenix-IronForce Racing	16	4	7	2	12	275	**2nd**
2021	Porsche Supercup	BWT Lechner Racing	8	1	1	1	4	110	**3rd**
2022	ADAC GT Masters	Team Joos Sportwagentechnik	14	2	2	0	4	178	**2nd**
2022	Deutsche Tourenwagen Masters	AlphaTauri AF Corse	2	0	0	0	0	7	23rd
2022	GT World Challenge Europe Endurance Cup	Allied-Racing	3	0	0	0	0	0	NC
2022	24 Hours of Nürburgring - Cup2	Frikadelli Racing Team	1	0	0	0	0	N/A	DNF
2022	FIA Motorsport Games GT Sprint	Team Turkey	1	0	0	0	0	N/A	5th
2023	Asian Le Mans Series - LMP2	DKR Engineering	4	1	0	0	4	76	**1st**
2023	Deutsche Tourenwagen Masters	KÜS Team Bernhard	15	0	0	2	1	70	15th
2023	GT World Challenge Europe Endurance Cup	Dinamic GT Huber Racing	3	0	0	0	0	11	16th
2023	GT World Challenge Europe Endurance Cup	Dinamic GT	2	0	0	0	0	11	16th
2023	Intercontinental GT Challenge	Dinamic GT Huber Racing	1	0	0	0	0	6	27th
2023	GT World Challenge Europe Sprint Cup	Pure Rxcing	4	0	0	0	0	0.5	23rd
2023	GT World Challenge Europe Sprint Cup	CLRT	2	0	0	0	0	0.5	23rd
2023	24 Hours of Nürburgring - SP9	Dinamic GT	1	0	0	0	0	N/A	DNF
2024	Deutsche Tourenwagen Masters	Manthey EMA	16	0	0	1	1	69	16th
2024	Intercontinental GT Challenge	Manthey EMA	4	2	0	0	2	50	**2nd**
2024	Nürburgring Langstrecken-Serie - SP9	Manthey EMA	3	0	0	1	3	0	NC†
2024	24 Hours of Nürburgring - SP9	Manthey EMA	1	0	0	0	1	N/A	**2nd**
2024	GT World Challenge Europe Endurance Cup	Schumacher CLRT	5	0	0	0	1	18	15th
2024	GT World Challenge America - Pro-Am	GMG Racing	1	0	0	0	0	0	NC
2024	FIA Motorsport Games GT Sprint	Team Türkiye	1	1	1	1	1	N/A	**1st**
2025	Deutsche Tourenwagen Masters	Manthey EMA	16	5	0	2	5	192	**1st**
2025	Nürburgring Langstrecken-Serie - SP9	Manthey EMA							
2025	24 Hours of Nürburgring - SP9	Manthey EMA	1	0	1	0	1	N/A	**2nd**
2025	IMSA SportsCar Championship - GTD	Wright Motorsports	1	0	1	0	1	355	57th
2025	GT World Challenge Europe Endurance Cup	Schumacher CLRT	5	0	0	0	1	41	6th
2025	FIA GT World Cup	Schumacher CLRT	1	0	0	0	0	N/A	DNF
2026	IMSA SportsCar Championship - GTD Pro	Manthey Racing	1	0	0	0	0	278	34th
2026	Nürburgring Langstrecken-Serie - SP9	Manthey Racing EMA							
2026	24 Hours of Nürburgring - SP9	Manthey Racing EMA	1	0	0	0	0	N/A	DNF
2026	FIA World Endurance Championship - LMGT3	Manthey DK Engineering	8	0	0	0	1	64	11th
2026	GT World Challenge Europe Endurance Cup	Schumacher CLRT	1	0	0	0	0	12	21st
2026	GT World Challenge Asia	Phantom Global Racing	4	0	0	0	0	24	24th
2026	GT World Challenge America - Pro-Am	GMG Racing	1	1	1	1	1	0	NC†
2026	Intercontinental GT Challenge	Manthey Racing	1	0	0	0	0	52	5th
2026	Intercontinental GT Challenge	Schumacher CLRT	1	0	0	0	0	52	5th
2026	Intercontinental GT Challenge	Absolute Racing	1	0	0	0	1	52	5th
2026	Intercontinental GT Challenge	GMG Racing	1	1	0	0	1	52	5th

† As Güven was a guest driver, he was not eligible to score points.

=== Complete Porsche Supercup results ===
Season	Porsche Supercup										Points	Pos.
2019	CAT (Spain)	MON (Monaco)	RBR (Austria)	SIL (United Kingdom)	HOC‡ (Germany)	HUN (Hungary)	SPA (Belgium)	MNZ (Italy)	MEX (Mexico)		124	2nd
2019	2	5	Ret	**1**	12	8	2	5	2	2	124	2nd
2020	RBR (Austria)		HUN (Hungary)	SIL (United Kingdom)		CAT (Spain)	SPA (Belgium)	MNZ (Italy)			113	3rd
2020	8	**2**	2	9	**1**	8	**1**	Ret			113	3rd
2021	MON (Monaco)	RBR1 (Austria)	RBR2 (Austria)	HUN (Hungary)	SPA (Belgium)	ZND (Netherlands)	MNZ1 (Italy)	MNZ2 (Italy)			110	3rd
2021	20†	2	26	4	2	4	**1**	3			110	3rd

Notes

† – Driver did not finish the race, but were classified as they completed over 75% of the race distance.

=== Porsche Carrera Cup France results ===
Season	Porsche Carrera Cup France										Points	Pos.
2018												1st
2019												1st
2020	MAG (France)		LMS (France)		PAU (France)		SPA (Belgium)		CAT (Spain)		166	2nd
2020	1	5	3	4	DNS	2	2	1	Ret	2	166	2nd

=== Complete Porsche Carrera Cup Germany results ===
Season	Porsche Carrera Cup Germany													Points	Pos.
2021	SPA (Belgium)		OSC (Germany)		RBR (Austria)		MNZ (Italy)		ZND (Netherlands)		NÜR (Germany)	SAC (Germany)	HOC (Germany)	167	2nd
2021	Ret	4	1	2	**3**	**2**	3	2	**3**	**1**				167	2nd

=== Porsche Sprint Challenge Middle East results ===
Season	Porsche Sprint Challenge Middle East Bahrain			Points	Pos.
2021	1 (Bahrain)	2 (Bahrain)	3 (Bahrain)	50	1st
2021	1	1		50	1st

=== Complete 24 Hours of Nürburgring results ===
Year	Team	Co-Drivers	Car	Class	Laps	Pos.	Class Pos.
2022	(Germany) Frikadelli Racing Team	(Germany) Klaus Abbelen (Germany) Hendrik von Danwitz (United Kingdom) Julian Harrison	Porsche 911 GT3 Cup (992)	Cup2	62	DNF	DNF
2023	(Italy) Dinamic GT	(Germany) Christian Engelhart (Germany) Laurin Heinrich (Belgium) Laurens Vanthoor	Porsche 911 GT3 R (992)	SP9; Pro	83	DNF	DNF
2024	(Germany) Manthey EMA	(France) Kévin Estre (Austria) Thomas Preining (Belgium) Laurens Vanthoor	Porsche 911 GT3 R (992)	SP9; Pro	50	**2nd**	**2nd**
2025	(Germany) Manthey EMA	(France) Kévin Estre (Austria) Thomas Preining	Porsche 911 GT3 R (992)	SP9; Pro	141	**2nd**	**2nd**
2026	(Germany) Manthey Racing	(Australia) Matt Campbell (France) Kévin Estre (Austria) Thomas Preining	Porsche 911 GT3 R (992.2)	SP9; Pro	24	DNF	DNF

=== Complete ADAC GT Masters results ===
(key) (Races in bold indicate pole position) (Races in italics indicate fastest lap)

Year	Team	Car	1	2	3	4	5	6	7	8	9	10	11	12	13	14	Pos.	Points
2022	Team Joos Sportwagentechnik	Porsche 911 GT3 R	OSC; 1; 5	OSC; 2; 21	RBR; 1; 2^{2}	RBR; 2; 3^{3}	ZAN; 1; 6	ZAN; 2; 8^{2}	NÜR; 1; 5^{3}	NÜR; 2; 13	**LAU**; **1**; 1^{1}	LAU; 2; 4	SAC; 1; 5	SAC; 2 Ret	HOC; 1; 1	**HOC**; **2**; 4^{1}	**2nd**	**178**

=== Complete GT World Challenge Europe results ===
==== GT World Challenge Europe Endurance Cup ====
(key) (Races in bold indicate pole position) (Races in italics indicate fastest lap)

Year	Team	Car	Class	1	2	3	4	5	6	7	Pos.	Points
2022	Allied Racing	Porsche 911 GT3 R	Gold	IMO	LEC	SPA; 6H; Ret	SPA; 12H; Ret	SPA; 24H; Ret	HOC; 36		NC	0
2022	Allied Racing	Porsche 911 GT3 R	Pro-Am							CAT; 34	12th	18
2023	Dinamic GT Huber Racing	Porsche 911 GT3 R (992)	Pro	MNZ; 9	LEC; Ret	SPA; 6H; 16	SPA; 12H; 13	SPA; 24H; 12			16th	11
2023	Dinamic GT	Porsche 911 GT3 R (992)	Pro						NÜR; 10	CAT; 6	16th	11
2024	Schumacher CLRT	Porsche 911 GT3 R (992)	Pro	LEC; 14	SPA; 6H; 58†	SPA; 12H; Ret	SPA; 24H; Ret	NÜR; 2	MNZ; Ret	JED; Ret	15th	18
2025	Schumacher CLRT	Porsche 911 GT3 R (992)	Pro	LEC; 3	MNZ; 6	SPA; 6H; 73†	SPA; 12H; 73†	SPA; 24H; Ret	NÜR; 4	CAT; 9	6th	41
2026	Schumacher CLRT	Porsche 911 GT3 R (992.2)	Pro	LEC	MNZ	SPA; 6H; 12	SPA; 12H; 17	SPA; 24H; 4	NÜR	ALG	21st	12

==== GT World Challenge Europe Sprint Cup ====
(key) (Races in bold indicate pole position) (Races in italics indicate fastest lap)

Year	Team	Car	Class	1	2	3	4	5	6	7	8	9	10	Pos.	Points
2023	Pure Rxcing	Porsche 911 GT3 R (992)	Bronze			MIS; 1; 21	MIS; 2; 21	HOC; 1	HOC; 2	VAL; 1; 19	VAL; 2; 19			4th	52.5
2023	CLRT	Porsche 911 GT3 R (992)	Pro	BRH; 1	BRH; 2							ZAN; 1; 16	ZAN; 2; 10	23rd	0.5

=== Complete Deutsche Tourenwagen Masters results ===
(key) (Races in bold indicate pole position) (Races in italics indicate fastest lap)

Year	Team	Car	1	2	3	4	5	6	7	8	9	10	11	12	13	14	15	16	Pos.	Points
2022	AlphaTauri AF Corse	Ferrari 488 GT3 Evo 2020	ALG; 1	ALG; 2	LAU; 1	LAU; 2	IMO; 1	IMO; 2	NOR; 1 Ret^{3}	NOR; 2; 7	NÜR; 1	NÜR; 2	SPA; 1	SPA; 2	RBR; 1	RBR; 2	HOC; 1	HOC; 2	23rd	7
2023	KÜS Team Bernhard	Porsche 911 GT3 R (992)	OSC; 1; 20	OSC; 2 Ret	ZAN; 1; 13	ZAN; 2; 7	NOR; 1; 5^{3}	NOR; 2; 8	NÜR; 1 Ret	NÜR; 2 WD	LAU; 1; 16	LAU; 2 Ret	SAC; 1; 3^{2}	SAC; 2 Ret	RBR; 1; 11^{3}	RBR; 2; 7	HOC; 1 Ret	HOC; 2; 11	15th	70
2024	Manthey Racing	Porsche 911 GT3 R (992)	OSC; 1; 14	OSC; 2; 14	LAU; 1; 15	LAU; 2; 11	ZAN; 1 Ret	ZAN; 2 Ret	NOR; 1; 16	NOR; 2; 8	NÜR; 1; 17	NÜR; 2; 5	SAC; 1 DSQ	SAC; 2; 13	RBR; 1; 5	RBR; 2; 7	HOC; 1; 3^{3}	HOC; 2; 19	16th	69
2025	Manthey EMA	Porsche 911 GT3 R (992)	OSC; 1; 7	OSC; 2; 1	LAU; 1; 8	LAU; 2; 14	ZAN; 1; 1	ZAN; 2; 12	NOR; 1; 11	NOR; 2; 11	NÜR; 1 Ret	NÜR; 2; 5	SAC; 1; 1	SAC; 2; 1^{3}	RBR; 1; 16	RBR; 2; 7	HOC; 1; 5	HOC; 2; 1^{2}	1st	192

=== Complete Asian Le Mans Series results ===
(key) (Races in bold indicate pole position) (Races in italics indicate fastest lap)

Year	Team	Class	Car	Engine	1	2	3	4	Pos.	Points
2023	DKR Engineering	LMP2	Oreca 07	Gibson GK428 4.2 L V8	DUB; 1; 2	DUB; 2; 2	ABU; 1; 3	ABU; 2; 1	1st	76

=== Complete IMSA SportsCar Championship results ===
(key) (Races in bold indicate pole position; races in italics indicate fastest lap)

Year	Entrant	Class	Make	Engine	1	2	3	4	5	6	7	8	9	10	Rank	Points
2025	Wright Motorsports	GTD	Porsche 911 GT3 R (992)	Porsche M97/80 4.2 L Flat-6	**DAY**; 2	SEB	LGA	DET	WGL	MOS	ELK	VIR	IMS	PET	57th	355
2026	Manthey Racing	GTD Pro	Porsche 911 GT3 R (992.2)	Porsche M97/80 4.2 L Flat-6	DAY; 5	SEB	LGA	DET	WGL	MOS	ELK	VIR	IMS	PET	34th	278

=== Complete Bathurst 12 Hour results ===
Year	Team	Co-drivers	Car	Class	Laps	Pos.	Class pos.
2024	(Germany) Manthey Racing / (Australia) EMA Motorsport	(Australia) Matthew Campbell (Belgium) Laurens Vanthoor	Porsche 911 GT3 R	Pro	275	**1st**	**1st**

=== Complete FIA World Endurance Championship results ===
(key) (Races in bold indicate pole position) (Races in italics indicate fastest lap)

Year	Entrant	Class	Chassis	Engine	1	2	3	4	5	6	7	8	Rank	Points
2026	Manthey DK Engineering	LMGT3	Porsche 911 GT3 R (992.2)	Porsche M97/80 4.2 L Flat-6	IMO; 4	SPA; 7	LMS; Ret	SÃO; 4	COA; 2	FUJ; 7	CAT; 16	MNZ; 5	11th	64

=== Complete 24 Hours of Le Mans results ===
Year	Team	Co-Drivers	Car	Class	Laps	Pos.	Class Pos.
2026	(Germany) Manthey DK Engineering	Timur Boguslavskiy (United Kingdom) James Cottingham	Porsche 911 GT3 R (992.2)	LMGT3	254	DNF	DNF

Sporting positions
Preceded by Julien Andlauer	Porsche Carrera Cup France; Champion; 2018-2019	Succeeded by Jaxon Evans
Preceded by Ben Hanley; Matt Bell; Rodrigo Sales	Asian Le Mans Series; LMP2 Champion; 2023; With: Charlie Eastwood & Salih Yoluç	Succeeded by Colin Braun; Malthe Jakobsen; George Kurtz
Preceded by Jules Gounon; Kenny Habul; Luca Stolz	Winner of the Bathurst 12 Hour; 2024; With: Matt Campbell & Laurens Vanthoor	Succeeded by Augusto Farfus; Kelvin van der Linde; Sheldon van der Linde
Preceded by Mirko Bortolotti	Deutsche Tourenwagen Masters; Champion; 2025	Succeeded by Thomas Preining
