= Indianapolis 8 Hour =

Prominent International Sportscar Race

Indianapolis 8 Hours

Intercontinental GT Challenge
- Venue: Indianapolis Motor Speedway
- First race: 2020
- First IGTC race: 2020
- Duration: 8 Hours
- Most wins (driver): Dries Vanthoor (2); Sheldon van der Linde (2); Charles Weerts (2)
- Most wins (team): Team WRT (3)
- Most wins (manufacturer): BMW (4)

The Indianapolis 8 Hour is an endurance sports car race contested at Indianapolis Motor Speedway using the infield road course, first held in 2020, making it the first ever endurance sports car race at this venue. The event is the US leg of the Intercontinental GT Challenge (IGTC) and the finale of the GT World Challenge America series.

The race was originally open to GT3 and GT4 cars. In 2022 the GT4 class was dropped; in addition the race ran into the twilight for the first time; and the GT World Challenge America entrants were awarded points at the full 8 hours rather than at the three-hour mark in previous years.

For the GT World Challenge America drivers, this event is the longest of the races and the only event to include three drivers.

For the cars additionally competing in IGTC, this event differs from the remainder of IGTC, with the maximum number of Gold or Platinum drivers reduced to two.

In 2022, 14 cars took part in the IGTC within the total grid of 25 entries running GT World Challenge America.

== History ==
The US leg of the SRO's IGTC - the California 8 Hours - was held at Laguna Seca circuit from 2016 to 2019. The event was moved to Indianapolis in 2020.

For 2022 the GT World Challenge America element of the event was extended such that the entire 8 hour duration scored points for the GTWC America entrants; in previous years those entrants scored points for the first three hours only.

Additionally for 2022 GT4 classes were dropped from the race making it GT3 only.

== Winners ==
Year	Drivers	Vehicle	Entrant	Laps	Report	Ref
2020	(Netherlands) Nicky Catsburg (United States) Connor De Phillippi (Brazil) Augusto Farfus	BMW M6 GT3	(Germany) Walkenhorst Motorsport	300	Report	
2021	(Germany) Christopher Haase (Switzerland) Patric Niederhauser (Germany) Markus Winkelhock	Audi R8 LMS Evo	(France) Audi Sport Team Saintéloc	265 (Note: Due to the kerbing damage in the Turn 5-6 chicane, the 2021 race was run on the SCCA Runoffs layout instead of the INDYCAR Grand Prix layout, which utilised the old Formula One course with the newer Snake Pit section.)	Report	
2022	(Spain) Daniel Juncadella (Switzerland) Raffaele Marciello (Canada) Daniel Morad	Mercedes-AMG GT3 Evo	(Hong Kong) Mercedes-AMG Team Craft-Bamboo Racing	328	Report	
2023	(Austria) Philipp Eng (South Africa) Sheldon van der Linde (Belgium) Dries Vanthoor	BMW M4 GT3	(Belgium) Team WRT	332	Report	
2024	(Belgium) Charles Weerts (South Africa) Sheldon van der Linde (Belgium) Dries Vanthoor	BMW M4 GT3	(Belgium) Team WRT	320	Report	
2025	(Belgium) Charles Weerts (South Africa) Kelvin van der Linde (Italy) Valentino Rossi	BMW M4 GT3 Evo	(Belgium) Team WRT	198	Report	
2026	(Turkey) Ayhancan Güven (Italy) Riccardo Pera (United States) Kyle Washington	Porsche 911 GT3 R (992.2)	(United States) GMG Racing	323	Report	

== Multiple winners ==
=== By driver ===
Wins	Driver	Years
2	(South Africa) Sheldon van der Linde	2023, 2024
2	(Belgium) Dries Vanthoor	2023, 2024
2	(Belgium) Charles Weerts	2024, 2025

=== By manufacturer ===
Wins	Manufacturer	Years
4	(Germany) BMW	2020, 2023, 2024, 2025

== See also ==
- Intercontinental GT Challenge
