= 2026 Indianapolis 8 Hour =

Sports car race in Indianapolis, Indiana

(United States) Indianapolis 8 Hour
Event information
- Round 5 of 5 in the 2026 Intercontinental GT Challenge
- Date: 10 October 2026
- Location: Indianapolis, Indiana, U.S.
- Venue: Indianapolis Motor Speedway
- Duration: 8 Hours

Results
- Laps completed: 323
- Distance: 1,267.78 km (787.76 mi)

Pole position
- Time: 1:22.283
- Team: (United States) Turner Motorsport
- Drivers: (United States) Connor De Phillippi (United States) Robby Foley (United States) Justin Rothberg

Winners
- Time: 8:00:03.910
- Team: (United States) GMG Racing
- Drivers: (Turkey) Ayhancan Güven (Italy) Riccardo Pera (United States) Kyle Washington

The 2026 Indianapolis 8 Hour (formally known as the DESDER Indianapolis 8 Hour) was a sports car race held at the Indianapolis Motor Speedway in Indianapolis, Indiana, on October 10, 2026. It was the fifth and final round of the 2026 Intercontinental GT Challenge and the seventh and final round of the 2026 GT World Challenge America season.

== Entry list ==
The final entry list was announced on October 2, featuring 28 entries. Eight manufacturers were represented: 11 Porsche cars, 6 Mercedes cars, 3 BMW and Ferrari cars and 1 car each from Aston Martin, Corvette, Ford, Lamborghini and McLaren.

== Race results ==
Class winners denoted in bold and with ‡

Intercontinental GT Challenge
Previous race: 2026 Suzuka 1000 km	2026 season	Next race: none
