= 2026 Intercontinental GT Challenge =

Motorsport event

The 2026 Intercontinental GT Challenge is the eleventh season of the Intercontinental GT Challenge. The season began with the Bathurst 12 Hour on 15 February and it is scheduled to conclude with Indianapolis 8 Hour on 10 October.

== Calendar ==
The provisional calendar was released on 27 June 2025, featuring five rounds.

Also part of the GT World Challenge Europe
Also part of the GT World Challenge America

Round	Race	Circuit	Date	Location
1	(Australia) Meguiar's Bathurst 12 Hour	Mount Panorama Circuit, Bathurst, New South Wales, Australia	13–15 February	2026 Intercontinental GT Challenge is located in Earth
2	(Germany) ADAC Ravenol Nürburgring 24 Hours	Nürburgring Nordschleife, Nürburg, Germany	14–17 May	2026 Intercontinental GT Challenge is located in Earth
3	(Belgium) CrowdStrike 24 Hours of Spa	Circuit de Spa-Francorchamps, Stavelot, Belgium	25–28 June	2026 Intercontinental GT Challenge is located in Earth
4	(Japan) Suzuka 1000 km	Suzuka Circuit, Suzuka, Mie Prefecture, Japan	11–13 September	2026 Intercontinental GT Challenge is located in Earth
5	(United States) Desder Indianapolis 8 Hour	Indianapolis Motor Speedway, Indianapolis, Indiana, United States	8–10 October	2026 Intercontinental GT Challenge is located in Earth

== Entries ==
Manufacturer	Team	Car	No.	Drivers	Class	Rounds
BMW	(Germany) Rowe Racing	BMW M4 GT3 Evo	1	(Brazil) Augusto Farfus	P	2
BMW	(Germany) Rowe Racing	BMW M4 GT3 Evo	1	(Switzerland) Raffaele Marciello	P	2
BMW	(Germany) Rowe Racing	BMW M4 GT3 Evo	1	(South Africa) Jordan Pepper	P	2
BMW	(Germany) Rowe Racing	BMW M4 GT3 Evo	1	(South Africa) Kelvin van der Linde	P	2
BMW	(Germany) Rowe Racing	BMW M4 GT3 Evo	98	(United Kingdom) Jake Dennis	P	3
BMW	(Germany) Rowe Racing	BMW M4 GT3 Evo	98	(Brazil) Augusto Farfus	P	3
BMW	(Germany) Rowe Racing	BMW M4 GT3 Evo	98	(Switzerland) Raffaele Marciello	P	3
BMW	(Germany) Rowe Racing	BMW M4 GT3 Evo	99	(United Kingdom) Dan Harper	P	2
BMW	(Germany) Rowe Racing	BMW M4 GT3 Evo	99	(Germany) Max Hesse	P	2
BMW	(Germany) Rowe Racing	BMW M4 GT3 Evo	99	(Belgium) Dries Vanthoor	P	2
BMW	(Germany) Rowe Racing	BMW M4 GT3 Evo	99	(South Africa) Sheldon van der Linde	P	2
BMW	(Germany) Rowe Racing	BMW M4 GT3 Evo	998	(Germany) Jens Klingmann	G	3
BMW	(Germany) Rowe Racing	BMW M4 GT3 Evo	998	(Germany) Tim Tramnitz	G	3
BMW	(Germany) Rowe Racing	BMW M4 GT3 Evo	998	(Belgium) Ugo de Wilde	G	3
BMW	(Japan) Plus with BMW M Team Studie	BMW M4 GT3 Evo	5	(Japan) Seiji Ara	B	4
BMW	(Japan) Plus with BMW M Team Studie	BMW M4 GT3 Evo	5	(Japan) Kizuku Hirota	B	4
BMW	(Japan) Plus with BMW M Team Studie	BMW M4 GT3 Evo	5	(Japan) Tomohide Yamaguchi	B	4
BMW	(China) Team KRC	BMW M4 GT3 Evo	10	(Brazil) Augusto Farfus	PA	4
BMW	(China) Team KRC	BMW M4 GT3 Evo	10	(Chinese Taipei) Brian Lee	PA	4
BMW	(China) Team KRC	BMW M4 GT3 Evo	10	(Brazil) Marcelo Tomasoni	PA	4
BMW	(China) Team KRC	BMW M4 GT3 Evo	89	(Germany) Max Hesse	B	1, 4
BMW	(China) Team KRC	BMW M4 GT3 Evo	89	(Netherlands) Maxime Oosten	B	1, 4
BMW	(China) Team KRC	BMW M4 GT3 Evo	89	(China) Ruan Cunfan	B	1, 4
BMW	(United States) Riley Technologies	BMW M4 GT3 Evo	14	(United States) Andy Lee	PA	5
BMW	(United States) Riley Technologies	BMW M4 GT3 Evo	14	(Finland) Jesse Krohn	PA	5
BMW	(United States) Riley Technologies	BMW M4 GT3 Evo	14	(United States) Slade Stewart	PA	5
BMW	(United States) Turner Motorsport	BMW M4 GT3 Evo	29	(United States) Connor De Phillippi	P	5
BMW	(United States) Turner Motorsport	BMW M4 GT3 Evo	29	(United States) Robby Foley	P	5
BMW	(United States) Turner Motorsport	BMW M4 GT3 Evo	29	(United States) Justin Rothberg	P	5
BMW	(Belgium) Team WRT	BMW M4 GT3 Evo	30	(Belgium) Amaury Cordeel	S	3
BMW	(Belgium) Team WRT	BMW M4 GT3 Evo	30	(Belgium) Mathieu Detry	S	3
BMW	(Belgium) Team WRT	BMW M4 GT3 Evo	30	(Belgium) Matisse Lismont	S	3
BMW	(Belgium) Team WRT	BMW M4 GT3 Evo	30	(Argentina) Ignacio Montenegro	S	3
BMW	(Belgium) Team WRT	BMW M4 GT3 Evo	32	(South Africa) Jordan Pepper	P	1, 3
BMW	(Belgium) Team WRT	BMW M4 GT3 Evo	32	(South Africa) Kelvin van der Linde	P	1, 3
BMW	(Belgium) Team WRT	BMW M4 GT3 Evo	32	(Belgium) Charles Weerts	P	1, 3
BMW	(Belgium) Team WRT	BMW M4 GT3 Evo	46	(Italy) Valentino Rossi	P	1, 3
BMW	(Belgium) Team WRT	BMW M4 GT3 Evo	46	(Brazil) Augusto Farfus	P	1
BMW	(Belgium) Team WRT	BMW M4 GT3 Evo	46	(Switzerland) Raffaele Marciello	P	1
BMW	(Belgium) Team WRT	BMW M4 GT3 Evo	46	(Germany) Max Hesse	P	3
BMW	(Belgium) Team WRT	BMW M4 GT3 Evo	46	(United Kingdom) Dan Harper	P	3
BMW	(Belgium) Team WRT	BMW M4 GT3 Evo	69	(United Kingdom) Dan Harper	B	4
BMW	(Belgium) Team WRT	BMW M4 GT3 Evo	69	(United States) Anthony McIntosh	B	4
BMW	(Belgium) Team WRT	BMW M4 GT3 Evo	69	(Canada) Parker Thompson	B	4
BMW	Oman Racing by Century Motorsport	BMW M4 GT3 Evo	42	(Oman) Ahmad Al Harthy	B	3
BMW	Oman Racing by Century Motorsport	BMW M4 GT3 Evo	42	(Brazil) Pedro Ebrahim	B	3
BMW	Oman Racing by Century Motorsport	BMW M4 GT3 Evo	42	(Spain) Javier Sagrera	B	3
BMW	Oman Racing by Century Motorsport	BMW M4 GT3 Evo	42	(Australia) Calan Williams	B	3
BMW	(Germany) Schubert Motorsport	BMW M4 GT3 Evo	77	(Austria) Philipp Eng	P	2
BMW	(Germany) Schubert Motorsport	BMW M4 GT3 Evo	77	(Netherlands) Robin Frijns	P	2
BMW	(Germany) Schubert Motorsport	BMW M4 GT3 Evo	77	(Belgium) Charles Weerts	P	2
BMW	(Germany) Schubert Motorsport	BMW M4 GT3 Evo	77	(Germany) Marco Wittmann	P	2
BMW	(United States) Random Vandals Racing	BMW M4 GT3 Evo	99	(United States) Derek DeBoer	PA	5
BMW	(United States) Random Vandals Racing	BMW M4 GT3 Evo	99	(Sweden) Hampus Ericsson	PA	5
BMW	(United States) Random Vandals Racing	BMW M4 GT3 Evo	99	(Sweden) Marcus Ericsson	PA	5
BMW	(United Kingdom) Paradine Competition	BMW M4 GT3 Evo	991	(South Africa) Leyton Fourie	B	3
BMW	(United Kingdom) Paradine Competition	BMW M4 GT3 Evo	991	(United Kingdom) James Kellett	B	3
BMW	(United Kingdom) Paradine Competition	BMW M4 GT3 Evo	991	(United Kingdom) Darren Leung	B	3
BMW	(United Kingdom) Paradine Competition	BMW M4 GT3 Evo	991	(United Kingdom) David Pittard	B	3
BMW	(United Kingdom) Paradine Competition	BMW M4 GT3 Evo	992	(Mexico) Ian Aguilera	G	3
BMW	(United Kingdom) Paradine Competition	BMW M4 GT3 Evo	992	(Brazil) Christian Hahn	G	3
BMW	(United Kingdom) Paradine Competition	BMW M4 GT3 Evo	992	(Netherlands) Jop Rappange	G	3
BMW	(United Kingdom) Paradine Competition	BMW M4 GT3 Evo	992	(United Kingdom) Josh Rowledge	G	3
Chevrolet	(Malaysia) Johor Motorsports Racing JMR	Chevrolet Corvette Z06 GT3.R	0	(United Kingdom) Ben Green	PA	3
Chevrolet	(Malaysia) Johor Motorsports Racing JMR	Chevrolet Corvette Z06 GT3.R	0	(Malaysia) Prince Abu Bakar Ibrahim	PA	3
Chevrolet	(Malaysia) Johor Motorsports Racing JMR	Chevrolet Corvette Z06 GT3.R	0	(Malaysia) Prince Jefri Ibrahim	PA	3
Chevrolet	(Malaysia) Johor Motorsports Racing JMR	Chevrolet Corvette Z06 GT3.R	0	(Australia) Jordan Love	PA	3
Chevrolet	(Malaysia) Johor Motorsports Racing JMR	Chevrolet Corvette Z06 GT3.R	99	(Australia) Jordan Love	PA	1
Chevrolet	(Malaysia) Johor Motorsports Racing JMR	Chevrolet Corvette Z06 GT3.R	99	(United Kingdom) Ben Green	PA	1, 4
Chevrolet	(Malaysia) Johor Motorsports Racing JMR	Chevrolet Corvette Z06 GT3.R	99	(Malaysia) Prince Abu Bakar Ibrahim	PA	1, 4
Chevrolet	(Malaysia) Johor Motorsports Racing JMR	Chevrolet Corvette Z06 GT3.R	99	(Malaysia) Prince Jefri Ibrahim	PA	1, 4
Chevrolet	(Malaysia) Johor Motorsports Racing JMR	Chevrolet Corvette Z06 GT3.R	2	(Netherlands) Nicky Catsburg	P	1, 4
Chevrolet	(Malaysia) Johor Motorsports Racing JMR	Chevrolet Corvette Z06 GT3.R	2	(United Kingdom) Alexander Sims	P	1, 4
Chevrolet	(Malaysia) Johor Motorsports Racing JMR	Chevrolet Corvette Z06 GT3.R	2	(New Zealand) Earl Bamber	P	1
Chevrolet	(Malaysia) Johor Motorsports Racing JMR	Chevrolet Corvette Z06 GT3.R	2	(New Zealand) Scott McLaughlin	P	4
Chevrolet	(United Kingdom) Steller Motorsport	Chevrolet Corvette Z06 GT3.R	24	(France) Antoine Doquin	G	3
Chevrolet	(United Kingdom) Steller Motorsport	Chevrolet Corvette Z06 GT3.R	24	(Denmark) Dennis Lind	G	3
Chevrolet	(United Kingdom) Steller Motorsport	Chevrolet Corvette Z06 GT3.R	24	(Denmark) Mikkel Gaarde Pedersen	G	3
Chevrolet	(United Kingdom) Steller Motorsport	Chevrolet Corvette Z06 GT3.R	24	(Germany) Lenny Ried	G	3
Chevrolet	(United States) Chouest Povoledo Racing	Chevrolet Corvette Z06 GT3.R	50	(United States) Ross Chouest	PA	5
Chevrolet	(United States) Chouest Povoledo Racing	Chevrolet Corvette Z06 GT3.R	50	(Canada) Aaron Povoledo	PA	5
Ferrari	(Australia) Arise Racing GT	Ferrari 296 GT3	26	(New Zealand) Jaxon Evans	P	1
Ferrari	(Australia) Arise Racing GT	Ferrari 296 GT3	26	(Italy) Davide Rigon	P	1
Ferrari	(Australia) Arise Racing GT	Ferrari 296 GT3	26	(Brazil) Daniel Serra	P	1
Ferrari	(United Kingdom) Ziggo Sport Tempesta by ARGT	Ferrari 296 GT3	193	(United Kingdom) Chris Froggatt	B	1
Ferrari	(United Kingdom) Ziggo Sport Tempesta by ARGT	Ferrari 296 GT3	193	(Hong Kong) Jonathan Hui	B	1
Ferrari	(United Kingdom) Ziggo Sport Tempesta by ARGT	Ferrari 296 GT3	193	(Italy) Lorenzo Patrese	B	1
Ferrari	(United Kingdom) Ziggo Sport Tempesta by ARGT	Ferrari 296 GT3	193	(New Zealand) Ryan Wood	B	1
Ferrari	(Japan) Realize Kondo Racing with Rinaldi	Ferrari 296 GT3 Evo	45	(Germany) Dennis Marschall	P	2
Ferrari	(Japan) Realize Kondo Racing with Rinaldi	Ferrari 296 GT3 Evo	45	(France) Thomas Neubauer	P	2
Ferrari	(Japan) Realize Kondo Racing with Rinaldi	Ferrari 296 GT3 Evo	45	(Netherlands) Thierry Vermeulen	P	2
Ferrari	(Japan) Realize Kondo Racing with Rinaldi	Ferrari 296 GT3 Evo	45	(South Africa) David Perel	P	2
Ferrari	(Germany) Rinaldi Racing	Ferrari 296 GT3 Evo	45	(South Africa) David Perel	S	3
Ferrari	(Germany) Rinaldi Racing	Ferrari 296 GT3 Evo	45	(Italy) Alessandro Balzan	S	3
Ferrari	(Germany) Rinaldi Racing	Ferrari 296 GT3 Evo	45	(Spain) Rafael Durán	S	3
Ferrari	(Germany) Rinaldi Racing	Ferrari 296 GT3 Evo	45	(United States) Dylan Medler	S	3
Ferrari	(Japan) Ponos Racing	Ferrari 296 GT3 Evo	45	(Japan) Tadasuke Makino	P	4
Ferrari	(Japan) Ponos Racing	Ferrari 296 GT3 Evo	45	(Japan) Seita Nonaka	P	4
Ferrari	(Japan) Ponos Racing	Ferrari 296 GT3 Evo	45	(Japan) Takuro Shinohara	P	4
Ferrari	(Italy) AF Corse USA (Note: Car No. 50, No. 51, No. 52 and No. 70 entered as AF Corse, and car No. 71 entered as Selected Car Racing.) (Italy) AF Corse (Denmark) Selected Car Racing	Ferrari 296 GT3 Evo	12	(Argentina) Matías Pérez Companc	P	5
Ferrari	(Italy) AF Corse USA (Italy) AF Corse (Denmark) Selected Car Racing	Ferrari 296 GT3 Evo	12	(Denmark) Frederik Schandorff	P	5
Ferrari	(Italy) AF Corse USA (Italy) AF Corse (Denmark) Selected Car Racing	Ferrari 296 GT3 Evo	12	(Denmark) Nicklas Nielsen	P	5
Ferrari	(Italy) AF Corse USA (Italy) AF Corse (Denmark) Selected Car Racing	Ferrari 296 GT3 Evo	50	(Indonesia) Sean Gelael	P	3
Ferrari	(Italy) AF Corse USA (Italy) AF Corse (Denmark) Selected Car Racing	Ferrari 296 GT3 Evo	50	(Monaco) Arthur Leclerc	P	3
Ferrari	(Italy) AF Corse USA (Italy) AF Corse (Denmark) Selected Car Racing	Ferrari 296 GT3 Evo	50	(France) Lilou Wadoux	P	3
Ferrari	(Italy) AF Corse USA (Italy) AF Corse (Denmark) Selected Car Racing	Ferrari 296 GT3 Evo	51	(Italy) Tommaso Mosca	P	3
Ferrari	(Italy) AF Corse USA (Italy) AF Corse (Denmark) Selected Car Racing	Ferrari 296 GT3 Evo	51	(Denmark) Nicklas Nielsen	P	3
Ferrari	(Italy) AF Corse USA (Italy) AF Corse (Denmark) Selected Car Racing	Ferrari 296 GT3 Evo	51	(Italy) Alessio Rovera	P	3
Ferrari	(Italy) AF Corse USA (Italy) AF Corse (Denmark) Selected Car Racing	Ferrari 296 GT3 Evo	52	(Italy) Francesco Braschi	S	3
Ferrari	(Italy) AF Corse USA (Italy) AF Corse (Denmark) Selected Car Racing	Ferrari 296 GT3 Evo	52	(Belgium) Jef Machiels	S	3
Ferrari	(Italy) AF Corse USA (Italy) AF Corse (Denmark) Selected Car Racing	Ferrari 296 GT3 Evo	52	(Belgium) Gilles Stadsbader	S	3
Ferrari	(Italy) AF Corse USA (Italy) AF Corse (Denmark) Selected Car Racing	Ferrari 296 GT3 Evo	52	(Peru) Matías Zagazeta	S	3
Ferrari	(Italy) AF Corse USA (Italy) AF Corse (Denmark) Selected Car Racing	Ferrari 296 GT3 Evo	70	(Republic of Ireland) Peter Dempsey	PA	3
Ferrari	(Italy) AF Corse USA (Italy) AF Corse (Denmark) Selected Car Racing	Ferrari 296 GT3 Evo	70	(Spain) Miguel Molina	PA	3
Ferrari	(Italy) AF Corse USA (Italy) AF Corse (Denmark) Selected Car Racing	Ferrari 296 GT3 Evo	70	(Brazil) Custodio Toledo	PA	3
Ferrari	(Italy) AF Corse USA (Italy) AF Corse (Denmark) Selected Car Racing	Ferrari 296 GT3 Evo	70	(France) Matthieu Vaxivière	PA	3
Ferrari	(Italy) AF Corse USA (Italy) AF Corse (Denmark) Selected Car Racing	Ferrari 296 GT3 Evo	71	(Denmark) Simon Birch	G	3
Ferrari	(Italy) AF Corse USA (Italy) AF Corse (Denmark) Selected Car Racing	Ferrari 296 GT3 Evo	71	(Denmark) Malte Ebdrup	G	3
Ferrari	(Italy) AF Corse USA (Italy) AF Corse (Denmark) Selected Car Racing	Ferrari 296 GT3 Evo	71	(Denmark) Conrad Laursen	G	3
Ferrari	(Italy) AF Corse USA (Italy) AF Corse (Denmark) Selected Car Racing	Ferrari 296 GT3 Evo	71	(Denmark) Frederik Schandorff	G	3
Ferrari	(Italy) AF Corse USA (Italy) AF Corse (Denmark) Selected Car Racing	Ferrari 296 GT3 Evo	163	(United States) Jay Schreibman	Am	5
Ferrari	(Italy) AF Corse USA (Italy) AF Corse (Denmark) Selected Car Racing	Ferrari 296 GT3 Evo	163	(Brazil) Oswaldo Negri Jr.	Am	5
Ferrari	(Italy) AF Corse USA (Italy) AF Corse (Denmark) Selected Car Racing	Ferrari 296 GT3 Evo	163	(Denmark) Benny Simonsen	Am	5
Ferrari	(United Kingdom) JMW Motorsport	Ferrari 296 GT3 Evo	60	(France) Pierre-Louis Chovet	B	3
Ferrari	(United Kingdom) JMW Motorsport	Ferrari 296 GT3 Evo	60	(Germany) Tim Heinemann	B	3
Ferrari	(United Kingdom) JMW Motorsport	Ferrari 296 GT3 Evo	60	(Switzerland) Rolf Ineichen	B	3
Ferrari	(United Kingdom) JMW Motorsport	Ferrari 296 GT3 Evo	60	(Germany) Thomas Kiefer	B	3
Ferrari	(Japan) LM corsa	Ferrari 296 GT3 Evo	60	(Italy) Giancarlo Fisichella	PA	4
Ferrari	(Japan) LM corsa	Ferrari 296 GT3 Evo	60	(Japan) Kei Nakanishi	PA	4
Ferrari	(Japan) LM corsa	Ferrari 296 GT3 Evo	60	(Japan) Shigekazu Wakisaka	PA	4
Ferrari	(Japan) LM corsa	Ferrari 296 GT3 Evo	80	(Japan) Naoki Hattori	B	4
Ferrari	(Japan) LM corsa	Ferrari 296 GT3 Evo	80	(Japan) Ryo Ogawa	B	4
Ferrari	(Japan) LM corsa	Ferrari 296 GT3 Evo	80	(Japan) Hiroki Yoshimoto	B	4
Ferrari	(United States) Scuderia Corsa	Ferrari 296 GT3 Evo	67	(United States) Mitchell Green	Am	5
Ferrari	(United States) Scuderia Corsa	Ferrari 296 GT3 Evo	67	(United States) Conrad Grunewald	Am	5
Ferrari	(United States) Scuderia Corsa	Ferrari 296 GT3 Evo	67	(United Kingdom) Jamie Morrow	Am	5
Ferrari	(China) Harmony Racing	Ferrari 296 GT3 Evo	72	(New Zealand) Brendon Leitch	PA	4
Ferrari	(China) Harmony Racing	Ferrari 296 GT3 Evo	72	(Hong Kong) Liu Kai Shun	PA	4
Ferrari	(China) Harmony Racing	Ferrari 296 GT3 Evo	72	(China) Song Jiajun	PA	4
Ferrari	(Switzerland) Kessel Racing	Ferrari 296 GT3 Evo	74	(United States) Dustin Blattner	B	3
Ferrari	(Switzerland) Kessel Racing	Ferrari 296 GT3 Evo	74	(France) Mathys Jaubert	B	3
Ferrari	(Switzerland) Kessel Racing	Ferrari 296 GT3 Evo	74	(Germany) Dennis Marschall	B	3
Ferrari	(Switzerland) Kessel Racing	Ferrari 296 GT3 Evo	74	(United Kingdom) Ben Tuck	B	3
Ferrari	(Japan) Norik Racing	Ferrari 296 GT3 Evo	181	(Japan) Taku Bamba	PA	4
Ferrari	(Japan) Norik Racing	Ferrari 296 GT3 Evo	181	(Japan) Norikazu Shibata	PA	4
Ferrari	(Japan) Norik Racing	Ferrari 296 GT3 Evo	181	(United Kingdom) David Tan	PA	4
Ferrari	(Japan) Maezawa Racing	Ferrari 296 GT3 Evo	555	(Japan) Yusaku Maezawa	B	4
Ferrari	(Japan) Maezawa Racing	Ferrari 296 GT3 Evo	555	(Italy) Alessio Rovera	B	4
Ferrari	(Japan) Maezawa Racing	Ferrari 296 GT3 Evo	555	(Japan) Naoki Yokomizo	B	4
Ford	(Germany) HRT Ford Racing	Ford Mustang GT3	64	(Australia) Broc Feeney	P	1
Ford	(Germany) HRT Ford Racing	Ford Mustang GT3	64	(Germany) Christopher Mies	P	1
Ford	(Germany) HRT Ford Racing	Ford Mustang GT3	64	(Norway) Dennis Olsen	P	1
Ford	(Germany) HRT Ford Racing	Ford Mustang GT3 Evo	64	(India) Arjun Maini	P	2–3
Ford	(Germany) HRT Ford Racing	Ford Mustang GT3 Evo	64	(Switzerland) Fabio Scherer	P	2–3
Ford	(Germany) HRT Ford Racing	Ford Mustang GT3 Evo	64	(Germany) David Schumacher	P	2
Ford	(Germany) HRT Ford Racing	Ford Mustang GT3 Evo	64	(Germany) Frank Stippler	P	2
Ford	(Germany) HRT Ford Racing	Ford Mustang GT3 Evo	64	(France) Thomas Drouet	P	3
Ford	(Germany) HRT Ford Racing	Ford Mustang GT3 Evo	65	(Netherlands) Colin Caresani	PA	2
Ford	(Germany) HRT Ford Racing	Ford Mustang GT3 Evo	65	(Germany) Hubert Haupt	PA	2
Ford	(Germany) HRT Ford Racing	Ford Mustang GT3 Evo	65	(Germany) Vincent Kolb	PA	2
Ford	(Germany) HRT Ford Racing	Ford Mustang GT3 Evo	65	(Germany) David Schumacher	PA	2
Ford	(Germany) HRT Ford Racing	Ford Mustang GT3 Evo	65	(Philippines) Eduardo Coseteng	S	3
Ford	(Germany) HRT Ford Racing	Ford Mustang GT3 Evo	65	(Netherlands) Maxime Oosten	S	3
Ford	(Germany) HRT Ford Racing	Ford Mustang GT3 Evo	65	(Germany) Max Reis	S	3
Ford	(Germany) HRT Ford Racing	Ford Mustang GT3 Evo	65	(Germany) Finn Wiebelhaus	S	3
Ford	(Germany) HRT Ford Racing	Ford Mustang GT3 Evo	67	(Germany) Christopher Mies	P	2
Ford	(Germany) HRT Ford Racing	Ford Mustang GT3 Evo	67	(Norway) Dennis Olsen	P	2
Ford	(Germany) HRT Ford Racing	Ford Mustang GT3 Evo	67	(Germany) Frank Stippler	P	2
Ford	(Germany) HRT Ford Racing	Ford Mustang GT3 Evo	67	(Belgium) Frederic Vervisch	P	2
Ford	(United States) Dollahite Racing	Ford Mustang GT3 Evo	6	(United States) Scott Dollahite	PA	5
Ford	(United States) Dollahite Racing	Ford Mustang GT3 Evo	6	(Germany) Christopher Mies	PA	5
Ford	(United States) Dollahite Racing	Ford Mustang GT3 Evo	6	(United Kingdom) Alex Sedgwick	PA	5
Ford	(Australia) Miedecke Motorsport by Team MPC	Ford Mustang GT3 Evo	64	(Germany) Christopher Mies	P	4
Ford	(Australia) Miedecke Motorsport by Team MPC	Ford Mustang GT3 Evo	64	(Norway) Dennis Olsen	P	4
Ford	(Australia) Miedecke Motorsport by Team MPC	Ford Mustang GT3 Evo	64	(Belgium) Frédéric Vervisch	P	4
Mercedes-AMG	(Netherlands) Mercedes-AMG Team Verstappen Racing	Mercedes-AMG GT3 Evo	3	(Andorra) Jules Gounon	P	2–3
Mercedes-AMG	(Netherlands) Mercedes-AMG Team Verstappen Racing	Mercedes-AMG GT3 Evo	3	(Spain) Daniel Juncadella	P	2–3
Mercedes-AMG	(Netherlands) Mercedes-AMG Team Verstappen Racing	Mercedes-AMG GT3 Evo	3	(Austria) Lucas Auer	P	2
Mercedes-AMG	(Netherlands) Mercedes-AMG Team Verstappen Racing	Mercedes-AMG GT3 Evo	3	(Netherlands) Max Verstappen	P	2
Mercedes-AMG	(Netherlands) Mercedes-AMG Team Verstappen Racing	Mercedes-AMG GT3 Evo	3	(United Kingdom) Chris Lulham	P	3
Mercedes-AMG	(Australia) / Mercedes-AMG Team Tigani Motorsport (Note: Car No. 6 entered as Mercedes-AMG Team Tigani, car No. 44 entered as Geyer Valmont Racing / Tigani Motorsport, and car No. 47 entered as Supabarn Supermarkets / Tigani Motorsport.); (Australia) / Geyer Valmont Racing / Tigani Motorsport; (Australia) / Supabarn Supermarkets / Tigani Motorsport	Mercedes-AMG GT3 Evo	6	(Switzerland) Philip Ellis	P	1
Mercedes-AMG	(Australia) / Mercedes-AMG Team Tigani Motorsport; (Australia) / Geyer Valmont Racing / Tigani Motorsport; (Australia) / Supabarn Supermarkets / Tigani Motorsport	Mercedes-AMG GT3 Evo	6	(Australia) Jayden Ojeda	P	1
Mercedes-AMG	(Australia) / Mercedes-AMG Team Tigani Motorsport; (Australia) / Geyer Valmont Racing / Tigani Motorsport; (Australia) / Supabarn Supermarkets / Tigani Motorsport	Mercedes-AMG GT3 Evo	6	(Germany) Fabian Schiller	P	1
Mercedes-AMG	(Australia) / Mercedes-AMG Team Tigani Motorsport; (Australia) / Geyer Valmont Racing / Tigani Motorsport; (Australia) / Supabarn Supermarkets / Tigani Motorsport	Mercedes-AMG GT3 Evo	44	(Australia) Scott Andrews	PA	1
Mercedes-AMG	(Australia) / Mercedes-AMG Team Tigani Motorsport; (Australia) / Geyer Valmont Racing / Tigani Motorsport; (Australia) / Supabarn Supermarkets / Tigani Motorsport	Mercedes-AMG GT3 Evo	44	(New Zealand) Brendon Leitch	PA	1
Mercedes-AMG	(Australia) / Mercedes-AMG Team Tigani Motorsport; (Australia) / Geyer Valmont Racing / Tigani Motorsport; (Australia) / Supabarn Supermarkets / Tigani Motorsport	Mercedes-AMG GT3 Evo	44	(Australia) Sergio Pires	PA	1
Mercedes-AMG	(Australia) / Mercedes-AMG Team Tigani Motorsport; (Australia) / Geyer Valmont Racing / Tigani Motorsport; (Australia) / Supabarn Supermarkets / Tigani Motorsport	Mercedes-AMG GT3 Evo	44	(Australia) Marcel Zalloua	PA	1
Mercedes-AMG	(Australia) / Mercedes-AMG Team Tigani Motorsport; (Australia) / Geyer Valmont Racing / Tigani Motorsport; (Australia) / Supabarn Supermarkets / Tigani Motorsport	Mercedes-AMG GT3 Evo	47	(Australia) Zach Bates	B	1
Mercedes-AMG	(Australia) / Mercedes-AMG Team Tigani Motorsport; (Australia) / Geyer Valmont Racing / Tigani Motorsport; (Australia) / Supabarn Supermarkets / Tigani Motorsport	Mercedes-AMG GT3 Evo	47	(Australia) James Koundouris	B	1
Mercedes-AMG	(Australia) / Mercedes-AMG Team Tigani Motorsport; (Australia) / Geyer Valmont Racing / Tigani Motorsport; (Australia) / Supabarn Supermarkets / Tigani Motorsport	Mercedes-AMG GT3 Evo	47	(Australia) Theo Koundouris	B	1
Mercedes-AMG	(Australia) / Mercedes-AMG Team Tigani Motorsport; (Australia) / Geyer Valmont Racing / Tigani Motorsport; (Australia) / Supabarn Supermarkets / Tigani Motorsport	Mercedes-AMG GT3 Evo	47	(Australia) David Russell	B	1
Mercedes-AMG	(United States) GetSpeed Team Bartone Bros (Note: Car No. 6 entered as GetSpeed Team Bartone Bros, car No. 17 entered as Mercedes-AMG Team GetSpeed, car No. 12 entered as GetSpeed Team Dubai, and car No. 28 entered as GetSpeed Team PCX.) (United Arab Emirates) GetSpeed Team Dubai (Germany) Mercedes-AMG Team GetSpeed (Germany) GetSpeed Team PCX	Mercedes-AMG GT3 Evo	6	(United States) Anthony Bartone	S	3
Mercedes-AMG	(United States) GetSpeed Team Bartone Bros (United Arab Emirates) GetSpeed Team Dubai (Germany) Mercedes-AMG Team GetSpeed (Germany) GetSpeed Team PCX	Mercedes-AMG GT3 Evo	6	(Poland) Karol Basz	S	3
Mercedes-AMG	(United States) GetSpeed Team Bartone Bros (United Arab Emirates) GetSpeed Team Dubai (Germany) Mercedes-AMG Team GetSpeed (Germany) GetSpeed Team PCX	Mercedes-AMG GT3 Evo	6	(France) César Gazeau	S	3
Mercedes-AMG	(United States) GetSpeed Team Bartone Bros (United Arab Emirates) GetSpeed Team Dubai (Germany) Mercedes-AMG Team GetSpeed (Germany) GetSpeed Team PCX	Mercedes-AMG GT3 Evo	6	(France) Aurélien Panis	S	3
Mercedes-AMG	(United States) GetSpeed Team Bartone Bros (United Arab Emirates) GetSpeed Team Dubai (Germany) Mercedes-AMG Team GetSpeed (Germany) GetSpeed Team PCX	Mercedes-AMG GT3 Evo	12	(Canada) Mikaël Grenier	B	3
Mercedes-AMG	(United States) GetSpeed Team Bartone Bros (United Arab Emirates) GetSpeed Team Dubai (Germany) Mercedes-AMG Team GetSpeed (Germany) GetSpeed Team PCX	Mercedes-AMG GT3 Evo	12	(Germany) Tom Kalender	B	3
Mercedes-AMG	(United States) GetSpeed Team Bartone Bros (United Arab Emirates) GetSpeed Team Dubai (Germany) Mercedes-AMG Team GetSpeed (Germany) GetSpeed Team PCX	Mercedes-AMG GT3 Evo	12	(Luxembourg) Gabriel Rindone	B	3
Mercedes-AMG	(United States) GetSpeed Team Bartone Bros (United Arab Emirates) GetSpeed Team Dubai (Germany) Mercedes-AMG Team GetSpeed (Germany) GetSpeed Team PCX	Mercedes-AMG GT3 Evo	12	(South Africa) Jarrod Waberski	B	3
Mercedes-AMG	(United States) GetSpeed Team Bartone Bros (United Arab Emirates) GetSpeed Team Dubai (Germany) Mercedes-AMG Team GetSpeed (Germany) GetSpeed Team PCX	Mercedes-AMG GT3 Evo	17	(Germany) Maximilian Götz	P	3
Mercedes-AMG	(United States) GetSpeed Team Bartone Bros (United Arab Emirates) GetSpeed Team Dubai (Germany) Mercedes-AMG Team GetSpeed (Germany) GetSpeed Team PCX	Mercedes-AMG GT3 Evo	17	(Belgium) Maxime Martin	P	3
Mercedes-AMG	(United States) GetSpeed Team Bartone Bros (United Arab Emirates) GetSpeed Team Dubai (Germany) Mercedes-AMG Team GetSpeed (Germany) GetSpeed Team PCX	Mercedes-AMG GT3 Evo	17	(Germany) Fabian Schiller	P	3
Mercedes-AMG	(United States) GetSpeed Team Bartone Bros (United Arab Emirates) GetSpeed Team Dubai (Germany) Mercedes-AMG Team GetSpeed (Germany) GetSpeed Team PCX	Mercedes-AMG GT3 Evo	999	(France) Jordan Boisson	PA	3, 5
Mercedes-AMG	(United States) GetSpeed Team Bartone Bros (United Arab Emirates) GetSpeed Team Dubai (Germany) Mercedes-AMG Team GetSpeed (Germany) GetSpeed Team PCX	Mercedes-AMG GT3 Evo	999	(France) Patrick Charlaix	PA	3, 5
Mercedes-AMG	(United States) GetSpeed Team Bartone Bros (United Arab Emirates) GetSpeed Team Dubai (Germany) Mercedes-AMG Team GetSpeed (Germany) GetSpeed Team PCX	Mercedes-AMG GT3 Evo	999	(France) Marvin Klein	PA	3, 5
Mercedes-AMG	(United States) GetSpeed Team Bartone Bros (United Arab Emirates) GetSpeed Team Dubai (Germany) Mercedes-AMG Team GetSpeed (Germany) GetSpeed Team PCX	Mercedes-AMG GT3 Evo	999	(Belgium) Benjamin Paque	PA	3
Mercedes-AMG	(United States) TR3 Racing	Mercedes-AMG GT3 Evo	9	(Netherlands) Indy Dontje	PA	5
Mercedes-AMG	(United States) TR3 Racing	Mercedes-AMG GT3 Evo	9	(Canada) Daniel Morad	PA	5
Mercedes-AMG	(United States) TR3 Racing	Mercedes-AMG GT3 Evo	9	(United States) Brayton Williams	PA	5
Mercedes-AMG	(Germany) SR Motorsport by Schnitzelalm	Mercedes-AMG GT3 Evo	11	(Switzerland) Philip Ellis	PA	2
Mercedes-AMG	(Germany) SR Motorsport by Schnitzelalm	Mercedes-AMG GT3 Evo	11	(Germany) Jannes Fittje	PA	2
Mercedes-AMG	(Germany) SR Motorsport by Schnitzelalm	Mercedes-AMG GT3 Evo	11	(Germany) Jay Mo Härtling	PA	2
Mercedes-AMG	(Germany) SR Motorsport by Schnitzelalm	Mercedes-AMG GT3 Evo	11	(Germany) Kenneth Heyer	PA	2
Mercedes-AMG	(United States) / MAD Joker Racing (Note: Car No. 11 entered as MAD Joker Racing, and car No. 80 entered as Mercedes-AMG Team Lone Star Racing.); (United States) / Mercedes-AMG Team Lone Star Racing	Mercedes-AMG GT3 Evo	11	(United States) Marc Austin	Am	5
Mercedes-AMG	(United States) / MAD Joker Racing; (United States) / Mercedes-AMG Team Lone Star Racing	Mercedes-AMG GT3 Evo	11	(Republic of Ireland) Peter Dempsey	Am	5
Mercedes-AMG	(United States) / MAD Joker Racing; (United States) / Mercedes-AMG Team Lone Star Racing	Mercedes-AMG GT3 Evo	11	(United States) Ben Keating	Am	5
Mercedes-AMG	(United States) / MAD Joker Racing; (United States) / Mercedes-AMG Team Lone Star Racing	Mercedes-AMG GT3 Evo	80	(Netherlands) Lin Hodenius	P	5
Mercedes-AMG	(United States) / MAD Joker Racing; (United States) / Mercedes-AMG Team Lone Star Racing	Mercedes-AMG GT3 Evo	80	(Spain) Álex Palou	P	5
Mercedes-AMG	(United States) / MAD Joker Racing; (United States) / Mercedes-AMG Team Lone Star Racing	Mercedes-AMG GT3 Evo	80	(Germany) Luca Stolz	P	5
Mercedes-AMG	(Germany) Team Motopark	Mercedes-AMG GT3 Evo	20	(Angola) Rui Andrade	S	3
Mercedes-AMG	(Germany) Team Motopark	Mercedes-AMG GT3 Evo	20	(Australia) Christian Mansell	S	3
Mercedes-AMG	(Germany) Team Motopark	Mercedes-AMG GT3 Evo	20	(Switzerland) Yannick Mettler	S	3
Mercedes-AMG	(Germany) Team Motopark	Mercedes-AMG GT3 Evo	20	(Hungary) Levente Révész	S	3
Mercedes-AMG	(Germany) PROsport Racing Team Bilstein	Mercedes-AMG GT3 Evo	26	(Germany) Marek Böckmann	P	2
Mercedes-AMG	(Germany) PROsport Racing Team Bilstein	Mercedes-AMG GT3 Evo	26	(United Kingdom) Adam Christodoulou	P	2
Mercedes-AMG	(Germany) PROsport Racing Team Bilstein	Mercedes-AMG GT3 Evo	26	(Canada) Mikaël Grenier	P	2
Mercedes-AMG	(Germany) PROsport Racing Team Bilstein	Mercedes-AMG GT3 Evo	26	(United Kingdom) Chris Lulham	P	2
Mercedes-AMG	(United States) Heart of Racing by SPS	Mercedes-AMG GT3 Evo	27	(Brazil) Eduardo Barrichello	B	1
Mercedes-AMG	(United States) Heart of Racing by SPS	Mercedes-AMG GT3 Evo	27	(Canada) Roman De Angelis	B	1
Mercedes-AMG	(United States) Heart of Racing by SPS	Mercedes-AMG GT3 Evo	27	(United Kingdom) Ian James	B	1
Mercedes-AMG	(Canada) JMF Motorsports	Mercedes-AMG GT3 Evo	27	(United States) Wyatt Brichacek	PA	5
Mercedes-AMG	(Canada) JMF Motorsports	Mercedes-AMG GT3 Evo	27	(United States) Jason Daskalos	PA	5
Mercedes-AMG	(Canada) JMF Motorsports	Mercedes-AMG GT3 Evo	27	(Switzerland) Philip Ellis	PA	5
Mercedes-AMG	(Canada) JMF Motorsports	Mercedes-AMG GT3 Evo	34	(Canada) Mikaël Grenier	P	5
Mercedes-AMG	(Canada) JMF Motorsports	Mercedes-AMG GT3 Evo	34	(Belgium) Maxime Martin	P	5
Mercedes-AMG	(Canada) JMF Motorsports	Mercedes-AMG GT3 Evo	34	(United States) Michai Stephens	P	5
Mercedes-AMG	(Hong Kong) / Craft-Bamboo Racing (Note: Car No. 28 entered as Craft-Bamboo Racing, and car No. 77 entered as Mercedes-AMG Team Craft-Bamboo Racing.); (Hong Kong) / Mercedes-AMG Team Craft-Bamboo Racing	Mercedes-AMG GT3 Evo	28	(Brazil) João Paulo de Oliveira	PA	4
Mercedes-AMG	(Hong Kong) / Craft-Bamboo Racing; (Hong Kong) / Mercedes-AMG Team Craft-Bamboo Racing	Mercedes-AMG GT3 Evo	28	(Hong Kong) Kevin Tse	PA	4
Mercedes-AMG	(Hong Kong) / Craft-Bamboo Racing; (Hong Kong) / Mercedes-AMG Team Craft-Bamboo Racing	Mercedes-AMG GT3 Evo	28	(Japan) Daisuke Yamawaki	PA	4
Mercedes-AMG	(Hong Kong) / Craft-Bamboo Racing; (Hong Kong) / Mercedes-AMG Team Craft-Bamboo Racing	Mercedes-AMG GT3 Evo	77	(Estonia) Ralf Aron	P	1
Mercedes-AMG	(Hong Kong) / Craft-Bamboo Racing; (Hong Kong) / Mercedes-AMG Team Craft-Bamboo Racing	Mercedes-AMG GT3 Evo	77	(Austria) Lucas Auer	P	1
Mercedes-AMG	(Hong Kong) / Craft-Bamboo Racing; (Hong Kong) / Mercedes-AMG Team Craft-Bamboo Racing	Mercedes-AMG GT3 Evo	77	(Germany) Maximilian Götz	P	1
Mercedes-AMG	(Hong Kong) / Craft-Bamboo Racing; (Hong Kong) / Mercedes-AMG Team Craft-Bamboo Racing	Mercedes-AMG GT3 Evo	77	(Belgium) Maxime Martin	P	4
Mercedes-AMG	(Hong Kong) / Craft-Bamboo Racing; (Hong Kong) / Mercedes-AMG Team Craft-Bamboo Racing	Mercedes-AMG GT3 Evo	77	(Japan) Kakunoshin Ohta	P	4
Mercedes-AMG	(Hong Kong) / Craft-Bamboo Racing; (Hong Kong) / Mercedes-AMG Team Craft-Bamboo Racing	Mercedes-AMG GT3 Evo	77	(Germany) Luca Stolz	P	4
Mercedes-AMG	(Germany) Toyo Tires with Ring Racing	Mercedes-AMG GT3 Evo	32	(Germany) Andreas Gülden	PA	2
Mercedes-AMG	(Germany) Toyo Tires with Ring Racing	Mercedes-AMG GT3 Evo	32	(Japan) Yuichi Nakayama	PA	2
Mercedes-AMG	(Germany) Toyo Tires with Ring Racing	Mercedes-AMG GT3 Evo	32	(Germany) Tim Sandtler	PA	2
Mercedes-AMG	(Bahrain) 2 Seas Motorsport	Mercedes-AMG GT3 Evo	33	(United States) Jason Hart	B	3
Mercedes-AMG	(Bahrain) 2 Seas Motorsport	Mercedes-AMG GT3 Evo	33	(United States) Scott Noble	B	3
Mercedes-AMG	(Bahrain) 2 Seas Motorsport	Mercedes-AMG GT3 Evo	33	(United Kingdom) Aaron Walker	B	3
Mercedes-AMG	(Bahrain) 2 Seas Motorsport	Mercedes-AMG GT3 Evo	33	(United Kingdom) Lewis Williamson	B	3
Mercedes-AMG	(Bahrain) 2 Seas Motorsport	Mercedes-AMG GT3 Evo	222	(Republic of Ireland) Reece Barr	B	3
Mercedes-AMG	(Bahrain) 2 Seas Motorsport	Mercedes-AMG GT3 Evo	222	(United Kingdom) Charles Dawson	B	3
Mercedes-AMG	(Bahrain) 2 Seas Motorsport	Mercedes-AMG GT3 Evo	222	(United Kingdom) Kiern Jewiss	B	3
Mercedes-AMG	(Bahrain) 2 Seas Motorsport	Mercedes-AMG GT3 Evo	222	(Australia) Garnet Patterson	B	3
Mercedes-AMG	RAM Motorsport / GWR Australia	Mercedes-AMG GT3 Evo	45	(Australia) Brett Hobson	S	1
Mercedes-AMG	RAM Motorsport / GWR Australia	Mercedes-AMG GT3 Evo	45	(Australia) Dylan O'Keeffe	S	1
Mercedes-AMG	RAM Motorsport / GWR Australia	Mercedes-AMG GT3 Evo	45	(Australia) Garth Walden	S	1
Mercedes-AMG	(Hong Kong) KCMG	Mercedes-AMG GT3 Evo	47	(Japan) Nirei Fukuzumi	P	2
Mercedes-AMG	(Hong Kong) KCMG	Mercedes-AMG GT3 Evo	47	(Japan) Naoya Gamou	P	2
Mercedes-AMG	(Hong Kong) KCMG	Mercedes-AMG GT3 Evo	47	(Finland) Jesse Krohn	P	2
Mercedes-AMG	(Hong Kong) KCMG	Mercedes-AMG GT3 Evo	47	(United Kingdom) David Pittard	P	2
Mercedes-AMG	(United States) / Mercedes-AMG Team Mann-Filter (Note: Car No. 28 entered as Winward Racing, car No. 48 entered as Mercedes-AMG Team Mann-Filter, and car No. 80 entered as Mercedes AMG Team Ravenol.); (United States) / Mercedes-AMG Team Ravenol; (United States) / Winward Racing	Mercedes-AMG GT3 Evo	48	(Austria) Lucas Auer	P	3
Mercedes-AMG	(United States) / Mercedes-AMG Team Mann-Filter; (United States) / Mercedes-AMG Team Ravenol; (United States) / Winward Racing	Mercedes-AMG GT3 Evo	48	(Germany) Maro Engel	P	3
Mercedes-AMG	(United States) / Mercedes-AMG Team Mann-Filter; (United States) / Mercedes-AMG Team Ravenol; (United States) / Winward Racing	Mercedes-AMG GT3 Evo	48	(Germany) Luca Stolz	P	3
Mercedes-AMG	(United States) / Mercedes-AMG Team Mann-Filter; (United States) / Mercedes-AMG Team Ravenol; (United States) / Winward Racing	Mercedes-AMG GT3 Evo	80	(Germany) Maro Engel	P	2
Mercedes-AMG	(United States) / Mercedes-AMG Team Mann-Filter; (United States) / Mercedes-AMG Team Ravenol; (United States) / Winward Racing	Mercedes-AMG GT3 Evo	80	(Belgium) Maxime Martin	P	2
Mercedes-AMG	(United States) / Mercedes-AMG Team Mann-Filter; (United States) / Mercedes-AMG Team Ravenol; (United States) / Winward Racing	Mercedes-AMG GT3 Evo	80	(Germany) Fabian Schiller	P	2
Mercedes-AMG	(United States) / Mercedes-AMG Team Mann-Filter; (United States) / Mercedes-AMG Team Ravenol; (United States) / Winward Racing	Mercedes-AMG GT3 Evo	80	(Germany) Luca Stolz	P	2
Mercedes-AMG	(United States) / Mercedes-AMG Team Mann-Filter; (United States) / Mercedes-AMG Team Ravenol; (United States) / Winward Racing	Mercedes-AMG GT3 Evo	87	(Netherlands) "Daan Arrow"	B	3
Mercedes-AMG	(United States) / Mercedes-AMG Team Mann-Filter; (United States) / Mercedes-AMG Team Ravenol; (United States) / Winward Racing	Mercedes-AMG GT3 Evo	87	(Germany) Marvin Dienst	B	3
Mercedes-AMG	(United States) / Mercedes-AMG Team Mann-Filter; (United States) / Mercedes-AMG Team Ravenol; (United States) / Winward Racing	Mercedes-AMG GT3 Evo	87	(Italy) Gabriele Piana	B	3
Mercedes-AMG	(United States) / Mercedes-AMG Team Mann-Filter; (United States) / Mercedes-AMG Team Ravenol; (United States) / Winward Racing	Mercedes-AMG GT3 Evo	87	Rinat Salikhov (Note: Salikhov is Russian, but he competes as a neutral competitor as Russian national emblems were banned by the FIA following the Russian invasion of Ukraine. Move and Nesov, also Russian, compete under American and Slovene licences respectively for the same reason.)	B	3
Mercedes-AMG	(Australia) 75 Express	Mercedes-AMG GT3 Evo	75	(Australia) Kenny Habul	P	1, 4
Mercedes-AMG	(Australia) 75 Express	Mercedes-AMG GT3 Evo	75	(Andorra) Jules Gounon	P	1
Mercedes-AMG	(Australia) 75 Express	Mercedes-AMG GT3 Evo	75	(Germany) Luca Stolz	P	1
Mercedes-AMG	(Australia) 75 Express	Mercedes-AMG GT3 Evo	75	(Switzerland) Philip Ellis	P	4
Mercedes-AMG	(Australia) 75 Express	Mercedes-AMG GT3 Evo	75	(Canada) Mikaël Grenier	P	4
Mercedes-AMG	(Australia) Grove Racing	Mercedes-AMG GT3 Evo	100	(Australia) Kai Allen	P	1
Mercedes-AMG	(Australia) Grove Racing	Mercedes-AMG GT3 Evo	100	(Australia) Will Davison	P	1
Mercedes-AMG	(Australia) Grove Racing	Mercedes-AMG GT3 Evo	100	(Australia) Brenton Grove	P	1
Mercedes-AMG	(Belgium) Grupo Prom Racing Team	Mercedes-AMG GT3 Evo	177	(Netherlands) Colin Caresani	PA	3
Mercedes-AMG	(Belgium) Grupo Prom Racing Team	Mercedes-AMG GT3 Evo	177	(United Kingdom) Adam Christodoulou	PA	3
Mercedes-AMG	(Belgium) Grupo Prom Racing Team	Mercedes-AMG GT3 Evo	177	(Mexico) Alfredo Hernández	PA	3
Mercedes-AMG	(Belgium) Grupo Prom Racing Team	Mercedes-AMG GT3 Evo	177	(France) Stéphane Tribaudini	PA	3
Mercedes-AMG	(Australia) Scott Taylor Motorsport	Mercedes-AMG GT3 Evo	222	(Australia) Chaz Mostert	P	1
Mercedes-AMG	(Australia) Scott Taylor Motorsport	Mercedes-AMG GT3 Evo	222	(Australia) Thomas Randle	P	1
Mercedes-AMG	(Australia) Scott Taylor Motorsport	Mercedes-AMG GT3 Evo	222	(Australia) Cameron Waters	P	1
Mercedes-AMG	(Hong Kong) Mercedes-AMG Team GMR	Mercedes-AMG GT3 Evo	888	(Germany) Maro Engel	P	1
Mercedes-AMG	(Hong Kong) Mercedes-AMG Team GMR	Mercedes-AMG GT3 Evo	888	(Canada) Mikaël Grenier	P	1
Mercedes-AMG	(Hong Kong) Mercedes-AMG Team GMR	Mercedes-AMG GT3 Evo	888	(Belgium) Maxime Martin	P	1
Porsche	(Germany) Herberth Motorsport	Porsche 911 GT3 R (992 I)	21	(Germany) Ralf Bohn	B	1
Porsche	(Germany) Herberth Motorsport	Porsche 911 GT3 R (992 I)	21	(Germany) Alfred Renauer	B	1
Porsche	(Germany) Herberth Motorsport	Porsche 911 GT3 R (992 I)	21	(Germany) Robert Renauer	B	1
Porsche	(New Zealand) EBM	Porsche 911 GT3 R (992 I)	61	(Austria) Klaus Bachler	P	1
Porsche	(New Zealand) EBM	Porsche 911 GT3 R (992 I)	61	(Switzerland) Ricardo Feller	P	1
Porsche	(New Zealand) EBM	Porsche 911 GT3 R (992 I)	61	(Germany) Laurin Heinrich	P	1
Porsche	(San Marino) Tsunami RT	Porsche 911 GT3 R (992 I)	79	(Italy) Fabio Babini	B	1
Porsche	(San Marino) Tsunami RT	Porsche 911 GT3 R (992 I)	79	(Switzerland) Alex Fontana	B	1
Porsche	(San Marino) Tsunami RT	Porsche 911 GT3 R (992 I)	79	(Italy) Johannes Zelger	B	1
Porsche	(Denmark) High Class Racing	Porsche 911 GT3 R (992 I)	86	(France) Dorian Boccolacci	B	1
Porsche	(Denmark) High Class Racing	Porsche 911 GT3 R (992 I)	86	(Denmark) Anders Fjordbach	B	1
Porsche	(Denmark) High Class Racing	Porsche 911 GT3 R (992 I)	86	(China) Kerong Li	B	1
Porsche	(Denmark) High Class Racing	Porsche 911 GT3 R (992 I)	86	(Denmark) Anders Fjordbach	PA	5
Porsche	(Denmark) High Class Racing	Porsche 911 GT3 R (992 I)	86	(China) Kerong Li	PA	5
Porsche	(Denmark) High Class Racing	Porsche 911 GT3 R (992 I)	86	(China) Ye Hongli	PA	5
Porsche	(Hong Kong) Absolute Racing	Porsche 911 GT3 R (992 I)	911	(Denmark) Bastian Buus	P	1
Porsche	(Hong Kong) Absolute Racing	Porsche 911 GT3 R (992 I)	911	(Australia) Matt Campbell	P	1
Porsche	(Hong Kong) Absolute Racing	Porsche 911 GT3 R (992 I)	911	(Belgium) Alessio Picariello	P	1
Porsche	(Belgium) Boutsen VDS	Porsche 911 GT3 R (992.2)	2	(France) Dorian Boccolacci	P	3
Porsche	(Belgium) Boutsen VDS	Porsche 911 GT3 R (992.2)	2	(Belgium) Alessio Picariello	P	3
Porsche	(Belgium) Boutsen VDS	Porsche 911 GT3 R (992.2)	2	(Netherlands) Morris Schuring	P	3
Porsche	(Belgium) Boutsen VDS	Porsche 911 GT3 R (992.2)	10	(France) Alessandro Ghiretti	G	3
Porsche	(Belgium) Boutsen VDS	Porsche 911 GT3 R (992.2)	10	(Sweden) Robin Knutsson	G	3
Porsche	(Belgium) Boutsen VDS	Porsche 911 GT3 R (992.2)	10	(Belgium) Gilles Magnus	G	3
Porsche	(Armenia) Goroyan RT by Car Collection	Porsche 911 GT3 R (992.2)	4	(France) Nathanaël Berthon	PA	2
Porsche	(Armenia) Goroyan RT by Car Collection	Porsche 911 GT3 R (992.2)	4	(Switzerland) Alex Fontana	PA	2
Porsche	(Armenia) Goroyan RT by Car Collection	Porsche 911 GT3 R (992.2)	4	(Armenia) Artur Goroyan	PA	2
Porsche	(Armenia) Goroyan RT by Car Collection	Porsche 911 GT3 R (992.2)	4	(Kazakhstan) Oleg Kvitka	PA	2
Porsche	(Germany) Car Collection Motorsport	Porsche 911 GT3 R (992.2)	8	(Canada) Reinhold Krahn	PA	3
Porsche	(Germany) Car Collection Motorsport	Porsche 911 GT3 R (992.2)	8	(Switzerland) Nicolò Rosi	PA	3
Porsche	(Germany) Car Collection Motorsport	Porsche 911 GT3 R (992.2)	8	(Italy) Niccolò Schirò	PA	3
Porsche	(Germany) Car Collection Motorsport	Porsche 911 GT3 R (992.2)	8	(Germany) Joel Sturm	PA	3
Porsche	(Germany) / Black Falcon Team EAE (Note: Car No. 5 entered as Black Falcon Team EAE, and car No. 48 entered as 48LOSCH Motorsport by Black Falcon.); (Germany) / 48LOSCH Motorsport by Black Falcon	Porsche 911 GT3 R (992.2)	5	(Turkey) Mustafa Mehmet Kaya	Am	2
Porsche	(Germany) / Black Falcon Team EAE; (Germany) / 48LOSCH Motorsport by Black Falcon	Porsche 911 GT3 R (992.2)	5	(Germany) Thomas Kiefer	Am	2
Porsche	(Germany) / Black Falcon Team EAE; (Germany) / 48LOSCH Motorsport by Black Falcon	Porsche 911 GT3 R (992.2)	5	(Italy) Gabriele Piana	Am	2
Porsche	(Germany) / Black Falcon Team EAE; (Germany) / 48LOSCH Motorsport by Black Falcon	Porsche 911 GT3 R (992.2)	5	(Germany) Mike Stursberg	Am	2
Porsche	(Germany) / Black Falcon Team EAE; (Germany) / 48LOSCH Motorsport by Black Falcon	Porsche 911 GT3 R (992.2)	48	(Netherlands) "Daan Arrow"	PA	2
Porsche	(Germany) / Black Falcon Team EAE; (Germany) / 48LOSCH Motorsport by Black Falcon	Porsche 911 GT3 R (992.2)	48	(Germany) Patrick Assenheimer	PA	2
Porsche	(Germany) / Black Falcon Team EAE; (Germany) / 48LOSCH Motorsport by Black Falcon	Porsche 911 GT3 R (992.2)	48	(Germany) Tobias Müller	PA	2
Porsche	(Germany) / Black Falcon Team EAE; (Germany) / 48LOSCH Motorsport by Black Falcon	Porsche 911 GT3 R (992.2)	48	(Luxembourg) Dylan Pereira	PA	2
Porsche	(Hong Kong) Absolute Racing (Note: Car No. 7 entered as Absolute Racing, and car No. 8 AO by Absolute.) (United States) AO by Absolute Racing	Porsche 911 GT3 R (992.2)	7	(France) Dorian Boccolacci	P	4
Porsche	(Hong Kong) Absolute Racing (United States) AO by Absolute Racing	Porsche 911 GT3 R (992.2)	7	(France) Alessandro Ghiretti	P	4
Porsche	(Hong Kong) Absolute Racing (United States) AO by Absolute Racing	Porsche 911 GT3 R (992.2)	7	(Turkey) Ayhancan Güven	P	4
Porsche	(Hong Kong) Absolute Racing (United States) AO by Absolute Racing	Porsche 911 GT3 R (992.2)	8	(France) Julien Andlauer	P	4
Porsche	(Hong Kong) Absolute Racing (United States) AO by Absolute Racing	Porsche 911 GT3 R (992.2)	8	(Germany) Laurin Heinrich	P	4
Porsche	(Hong Kong) Absolute Racing (United States) AO by Absolute Racing	Porsche 911 GT3 R (992.2)	8	(Belgium) Alessio Picariello	P	4
Porsche	(United States) McCann Racing	Porsche 911 GT3 R (992.2)	8	(United States) Michael McCann Jr.	P	5
Porsche	(United States) McCann Racing	Porsche 911 GT3 R (992.2)	8	(Belgium) Alessio Picariello	P	5
Porsche	(United States) McCann Racing	Porsche 911 GT3 R (992.2)	8	(Canada) Zachary Vanier	P	5
Porsche	(Lithuania) Pure Rxcing	Porsche 911 GT3 R (992.2)	9	(Austria) Max Hofer	S	3
Porsche	(Lithuania) Pure Rxcing	Porsche 911 GT3 R (992.2)	9	(United Kingdom) Alex Malykhin (Note: Malykhin is Belarusian, but he competes under a British licence as Belarusian national emblems were banned by the FIA following the Russian invasion of Ukraine.)	S	3
Porsche	(Lithuania) Pure Rxcing	Porsche 911 GT3 R (992.2)	9	(Slovenia) Alexey Nesov	S	3
Porsche	(Lithuania) Pure Rxcing	Porsche 911 GT3 R (992.2)	9	(Italy) Enzo Trulli	S	3
Porsche	(Japan) Bingo Racing with LM corsa	Porsche 911 GT3 R (992.2)	9	(Japan) Reimei Ito	B	4
Porsche	(Japan) Bingo Racing with LM corsa	Porsche 911 GT3 R (992.2)	9	(Japan) Ukyo Sasahara	B	4
Porsche	(Japan) Bingo Racing with LM corsa	Porsche 911 GT3 R (992.2)	9	(Japan) Shinji Takei	B	4
Porsche	(United States) Kellymoss	Porsche 911 GT3 R (992.2)	13	(Netherlands) Kay van Berlo	PA	5
Porsche	(United States) Kellymoss	Porsche 911 GT3 R (992.2)	13	(United States) Riley Dickinson	PA	5
Porsche	(United States) Kellymoss	Porsche 911 GT3 R (992.2)	13	(United States) Todd Parriott	PA	5
Porsche	(United States) Kellymoss	Porsche 911 GT3 R (992.2)	017	(United States) Colin Braun	PA	5
Porsche	(United States) Kellymoss	Porsche 911 GT3 R (992.2)	017	(United States) Michael Clark	PA	5
Porsche	(United States) Kellymoss	Porsche 911 GT3 R (992.2)	017	(Germany) Lars Kern	PA	5
Porsche	(United States) Kellymoss	Porsche 911 GT3 R (992.2)	88	(United States) John Gilliland	PA	5
Porsche	(United States) Kellymoss	Porsche 911 GT3 R (992.2)	88	(Netherlands) Loek Hartog	PA	5
Porsche	(United States) Kellymoss	Porsche 911 GT3 R (992.2)	88	(United States) Aaron Jeansonne	PA	5
Porsche	(Germany) / Dunlop Motorsports (Note: Car No. 17 entered as Dunlop Motorsports, and car No. 44 as Falken Motorsports.); (Germany) / Falken Motorsports	Porsche 911 GT3 R (992.2)	17	(France) Julien Andlauer	P	2
Porsche	(Germany) / Dunlop Motorsports; (Germany) / Falken Motorsports	Porsche 911 GT3 R (992.2)	17	(France) Dorian Boccolacci	P	2
Porsche	(Germany) / Dunlop Motorsports; (Germany) / Falken Motorsports	Porsche 911 GT3 R (992.2)	17	(Germany) Nico Menzel	P	2
Porsche	(Germany) / Dunlop Motorsports; (Germany) / Falken Motorsports	Porsche 911 GT3 R (992.2)	17	(Belgium) Alessio Picariello	P	2
Porsche	(Germany) / Dunlop Motorsports; (Germany) / Falken Motorsports	Porsche 911 GT3 R (992.2)	44	(Austria) Klaus Bachler	P	2
Porsche	(Germany) / Dunlop Motorsports; (Germany) / Falken Motorsports	Porsche 911 GT3 R (992.2)	44	(Germany) Tim Heinemann	P	2
Porsche	(Germany) / Dunlop Motorsports; (Germany) / Falken Motorsports	Porsche 911 GT3 R (992.2)	44	(Germany) Sven Müller	P	2
Porsche	(Germany) / Dunlop Motorsports; (Germany) / Falken Motorsports	Porsche 911 GT3 R (992.2)	44	(Netherlands) Morris Schuring	P	2
Porsche	(Germany) Lionspeed GP	Porsche 911 GT3 R (992.2)	18	(United Kingdom) Jake Hill	PA	2
Porsche	(Germany) Lionspeed GP	Porsche 911 GT3 R (992.2)	18	(Austria) Max Hofer	PA	2
Porsche	(Germany) Lionspeed GP	Porsche 911 GT3 R (992.2)	18	(Germany) Patrick Kolb	PA	2
Porsche	(Germany) Lionspeed GP	Porsche 911 GT3 R (992.2)	18	(United Kingdom) Kyle Tilley	PA	2
Porsche	(Germany) Lionspeed GP	Porsche 911 GT3 R (992.2)	24	(Switzerland) Ricardo Feller	P	2
Porsche	(Germany) Lionspeed GP	Porsche 911 GT3 R (992.2)	24	(Germany) Laurin Heinrich	P	2
Porsche	(Germany) Lionspeed GP	Porsche 911 GT3 R (992.2)	24	(Belgium) Laurens Vanthoor	P	2
Porsche	(Germany) Lionspeed GP	Porsche 911 GT3 R (992.2)	80	(Denmark) Bastian Buus	P	3
Porsche	(Germany) Lionspeed GP	Porsche 911 GT3 R (992.2)	80	(Switzerland) Ricardo Feller	P	3
Porsche	(Germany) Lionspeed GP	Porsche 911 GT3 R (992.2)	80	(Austria) Thomas Preining	P	3
Porsche	(Germany) Lionspeed GP	Porsche 911 GT3 R (992.2)	89	(Switzerland) Alex Fontana	B	3
Porsche	(Germany) Lionspeed GP	Porsche 911 GT3 R (992.2)	89	(Zimbabwe) Axcil Jefferies	B	3
Porsche	(Germany) Lionspeed GP	Porsche 911 GT3 R (992.2)	89	(Germany) Patrick Kolb	B	3
Porsche	(Germany) Lionspeed GP	Porsche 911 GT3 R (992.2)	89	(Canada) Bashar Mardini	B	3
Porsche	(Japan) / Porsche Center Okazaki Nine Racing (Note: Car No. 18 entered as Porsche Center Okazaki Nine Racing, and car No. 25 as Porsche Center Okazaki NK Racing.); (Japan) / Porsche Center Okazaki NK Racing	Porsche 911 GT3 R (992.2)	18	(Japan) Kazuto Kotaka	B	4
Porsche	(Japan) / Porsche Center Okazaki Nine Racing; (Japan) / Porsche Center Okazaki NK Racing	Porsche 911 GT3 R (992.2)	18	(Japan) Hiroaki Nagai	B	4
Porsche	(Japan) / Porsche Center Okazaki Nine Racing; (Japan) / Porsche Center Okazaki NK Racing	Porsche 911 GT3 R (992.2)	18	(Japan) Hibiki Taira	B	4
Porsche	(Japan) / Porsche Center Okazaki Nine Racing; (Japan) / Porsche Center Okazaki NK Racing	Porsche 911 GT3 R (992.2)	25	(Japan) Yuta Kamimura	B	4
Porsche	(Japan) / Porsche Center Okazaki Nine Racing; (Japan) / Porsche Center Okazaki NK Racing	Porsche 911 GT3 R (992.2)	25	(Japan) Tsubasa Kondo	B	4
Porsche	(Japan) / Porsche Center Okazaki Nine Racing; (Japan) / Porsche Center Okazaki NK Racing	Porsche 911 GT3 R (992.2)	25	(Japan) Kiyoshi Uchiyama	B	4
Porsche	(France) Schumacher CLRT	Porsche 911 GT3 R (992.2)	22	(Australia) Matt Campbell	P	3
Porsche	(France) Schumacher CLRT	Porsche 911 GT3 R (992.2)	22	(Turkey) Ayhancan Güven	P	3
Porsche	(France) Schumacher CLRT	Porsche 911 GT3 R (992.2)	22	(France) Frédéric Makowiecki	P	3
Porsche	(United States) RS1	Porsche 911 GT3 R (992.2)	28	(Netherlands) "Daan Arrow"	PA	5
Porsche	(United States) RS1	Porsche 911 GT3 R (992.2)	28	(United States) Danny Dyszelski	PA	5
Porsche	(United States) RS1	Porsche 911 GT3 R (992.2)	28	(Belgium) Jan Heylen	PA	5
Porsche	(South Korea) Hankook Competition	Porsche 911 GT3 R (992.2)	30	(Netherlands) Roelof Bruins	PA	2
Porsche	(South Korea) Hankook Competition	Porsche 911 GT3 R (992.2)	30	(Canada) Steven Cho	PA	2
Porsche	(South Korea) Hankook Competition	Porsche 911 GT3 R (992.2)	30	(South Korea) Jongkyum Kim	PA	2
Porsche	(South Korea) Hankook Competition	Porsche 911 GT3 R (992.2)	30	(Germany) Marco Seefried	PA	2
Porsche	(United States) Wright Motorsports	Porsche 911 GT3 R (992.2)	31	(Germany) Laurin Heinrich	PA	5
Porsche	(United States) Wright Motorsports	Porsche 911 GT3 R (992.2)	31	(United States) Dave Musial Jr.	PA	5
Porsche	(United States) Wright Motorsports	Porsche 911 GT3 R (992.2)	31	(New Zealand) Ryan Yardley	PA	5
Porsche	(United States) Wright Motorsports	Porsche 911 GT3 R (992.2)	120	(France) Kévin Estre	P	5
Porsche	(United States) Wright Motorsports	Porsche 911 GT3 R (992.2)	120	(United States) Thomas Merrill	P	5
Porsche	(United States) Wright Motorsports	Porsche 911 GT3 R (992.2)	120	(Netherlands) Morris Schuring	P	5
Porsche	(United States) GMG Racing	Porsche 911 GT3 R (992.2)	32	(Turkey) Ayhancan Güven	PA	5
Porsche	(United States) GMG Racing	Porsche 911 GT3 R (992.2)	32	(Italy) Riccardo Pera	PA	5
Porsche	(United States) GMG Racing	Porsche 911 GT3 R (992.2)	32	(United States) Kyle Washington	PA	5
Porsche	(Italy) Dinamic GT	Porsche 911 GT3 R (992.2)	54	(Denmark) Bastian Buus	P	2
Porsche	(Italy) Dinamic GT	Porsche 911 GT3 R (992.2)	54	(Denmark) Michael Christensen	P	2
Porsche	(Italy) Dinamic GT	Porsche 911 GT3 R (992.2)	54	(Netherlands) Loek Hartog	P	2
Porsche	(Italy) Dinamic GT	Porsche 911 GT3 R (992.2)	54	(Germany) Joel Sturm	P	2
Porsche	(Italy) Dinamic GT	Porsche 911 GT3 R (992.2)	54	(France) Loris Cabirou	S	3
Porsche	(Italy) Dinamic GT	Porsche 911 GT3 R (992.2)	54	(Thailand) Tanart Sathienthirakul	S	3
Porsche	(Italy) Dinamic GT	Porsche 911 GT3 R (992.2)	54	(Italy) Francesco Simonazzi	S	3
Porsche	(Italy) Dinamic GT	Porsche 911 GT3 R (992.2)	54	(United Kingdom) Angus Whiteside	S	3
Porsche	(Italy) Dinamic GT	Porsche 911 GT3 R (992.2)	55	(Italy) Michele Beretta	P	2
Porsche	(Italy) Dinamic GT	Porsche 911 GT3 R (992.2)	55	(France) Alessandro Ghiretti	P	2
Porsche	(Italy) Dinamic GT	Porsche 911 GT3 R (992.2)	55	(Netherlands) Loek Hartog	P	2
Porsche	(Italy) Dinamic GT	Porsche 911 GT3 R (992.2)	55	(Germany) Joel Sturm	P	2
Porsche	(New Zealand) EBM Giga Racing	Porsche 911 GT3 R (992.2)	61	(Malaysia) Adrian D'Silva	B	4
Porsche	(New Zealand) EBM Giga Racing	Porsche 911 GT3 R (992.2)	61	(France) Mathieu Jaminet	B	4
Porsche	(New Zealand) EBM Giga Racing	Porsche 911 GT3 R (992.2)	61	(China) Leo Ye Hongli	B	4
Porsche	(San Marino) Tsunami RT	Porsche 911 GT3 R (992.2)	79	(Italy) Fabio Babini	B	3
Porsche	(San Marino) Tsunami RT	Porsche 911 GT3 R (992.2)	79	(Japan) Hiroshi Hamaguchi	B	3
Porsche	(San Marino) Tsunami RT	Porsche 911 GT3 R (992.2)	79	(Germany) Nico Menzel	B	3
Porsche	(San Marino) Tsunami RT	Porsche 911 GT3 R (992.2)	79	(Italy) Johannes Zelger	B	3
Porsche	(San Marino) Tsunami RT	Porsche 911 GT3 R (992.2)	79	(Italy) Fabio Babini	PA	4–5
Porsche	(San Marino) Tsunami RT	Porsche 911 GT3 R (992.2)	79	(Italy) Johannes Zelger	PA	4–5
Porsche	(San Marino) Tsunami RT	Porsche 911 GT3 R (992.2)	79	(New Zealand) Daniel Gaunt	PA	4
Porsche	(San Marino) Tsunami RT	Porsche 911 GT3 R (992.2)	79	(Switzerland) Alex Fontana	PA	5
Porsche	(Denmark) High Class Racing	Porsche 911 GT3 R (992.2)	86	(Denmark) Anders Fjordbach	PA	2–3
Porsche	(Denmark) High Class Racing	Porsche 911 GT3 R (992.2)	86	(China) Kerong Li	PA	2–3
Porsche	(Denmark) High Class Racing	Porsche 911 GT3 R (992.2)	86	(China) Leo Ye Hongli	PA	2–3
Porsche	(Denmark) High Class Racing	Porsche 911 GT3 R (992.2)	86	(United Kingdom) Harry King	PA	2
Porsche	(Denmark) High Class Racing	Porsche 911 GT3 R (992.2)	86	(China) Yuan Bo	PA	3
Porsche	(Denmark) High Class Racing	Porsche 911 GT3 R (992.2)	86	(Denmark) Anders Fjordbach	B	4
Porsche	(Denmark) High Class Racing	Porsche 911 GT3 R (992.2)	86	(China) Kerong Li	B	4
Porsche	(Denmark) High Class Racing	Porsche 911 GT3 R (992.2)	86	(Germany) Joel Sturm	B	4
Porsche	(Germany) Herberth Motorsport (Note: Car No. & 91 entered as Herberth Motorsport, and car No. 93 as Ziggo Sport Tempesta Racing.) (United Kingdom) Ziggo Sport Tempesta Racing	Porsche 911 GT3 R (992.2)	91	(Germany) Ralf Bohn	B	3–4
Porsche	(Germany) Herberth Motorsport (United Kingdom) Ziggo Sport Tempesta Racing	Porsche 911 GT3 R (992.2)	91	(Germany) Alfred Renauer	B	3–4
Porsche	(Germany) Herberth Motorsport (United Kingdom) Ziggo Sport Tempesta Racing	Porsche 911 GT3 R (992.2)	91	(Netherlands) Huub van Eijndhoven	B	3
Porsche	(Germany) Herberth Motorsport (United Kingdom) Ziggo Sport Tempesta Racing	Porsche 911 GT3 R (992.2)	91	(France) Mathieu Jaminet	B	3
Porsche	(Germany) Herberth Motorsport (United Kingdom) Ziggo Sport Tempesta Racing	Porsche 911 GT3 R (992.2)	91	(Germany) Robert Renauer	B	4
Porsche	(Germany) Herberth Motorsport (United Kingdom) Ziggo Sport Tempesta Racing	Porsche 911 GT3 R (992.2)	91	(Germany) Ralf Bohn	PA	5
Porsche	(Germany) Herberth Motorsport (United Kingdom) Ziggo Sport Tempesta Racing	Porsche 911 GT3 R (992.2)	91	(Germany) Alfred Renauer	PA	5
Porsche	(Germany) Herberth Motorsport (United Kingdom) Ziggo Sport Tempesta Racing	Porsche 911 GT3 R (992.2)	91	(Germany) Robert Renauer	PA	5
Porsche	(Germany) Herberth Motorsport (United Kingdom) Ziggo Sport Tempesta Racing	Porsche 911 GT3 R (992.2)	93	(Italy) Eddie Cheever III	B	3–4
Porsche	(Germany) Herberth Motorsport (United Kingdom) Ziggo Sport Tempesta Racing	Porsche 911 GT3 R (992.2)	93	(United Kingdom) Chris Froggatt	B	3–4
Porsche	(Germany) Herberth Motorsport (United Kingdom) Ziggo Sport Tempesta Racing	Porsche 911 GT3 R (992.2)	93	(Hong Kong) Jonathan Hui	B	3–4
Porsche	(Germany) Herberth Motorsport (United Kingdom) Ziggo Sport Tempesta Racing	Porsche 911 GT3 R (992.2)	93	(Netherlands) Mex Jansen	B	3
Porsche	(Germany) Rutronik Racing	Porsche 911 GT3 R (992.2)	97	(Hong Kong) Antares Au	B	3
Porsche	(Germany) Rutronik Racing	Porsche 911 GT3 R (992.2)	97	(Denmark) Michelle Gatting	B	3
Porsche	(Germany) Rutronik Racing	Porsche 911 GT3 R (992.2)	97	(Germany) Sven Müller	B	3
Porsche	(Germany) Rutronik Racing	Porsche 911 GT3 R (992.2)	97	(Estonia) Martin Rump	B	3
Porsche	(Belgium) Mühlner Motorsport	Porsche 911 GT3 R (992.2)	123	(United Kingdom) Alex Brundle	PA	2
Porsche	(Belgium) Mühlner Motorsport	Porsche 911 GT3 R (992.2)	123	(Germany) Ben Bünnagel	PA	2
Porsche	(Belgium) Mühlner Motorsport	Porsche 911 GT3 R (992.2)	123	(Estonia) Martin Rump	PA	2
Porsche	(Belgium) Mühlner Motorsport	Porsche 911 GT3 R (992.2)	123	(Belgium) Armand Fumal	B	3
Porsche	(Belgium) Mühlner Motorsport	Porsche 911 GT3 R (992.2)	123	(Australia) Bayley Hall	B	3
Porsche	(Belgium) Mühlner Motorsport	Porsche 911 GT3 R (992.2)	123	(Australia) Andres Latorre Canon	B	3
Porsche	(Belgium) Mühlner Motorsport	Porsche 911 GT3 R (992.2)	123	(Germany) Tobias Müller	B	3
Porsche	(Germany) Manthey	Porsche 911 GT3 R (992.2)	911	(France) Kévin Estre	P	2
Porsche	(Germany) Manthey	Porsche 911 GT3 R (992.2)	911	(Turkey) Ayhancan Güven	P	2
Porsche	(Germany) Manthey	Porsche 911 GT3 R (992.2)	911	(Austria) Thomas Preining	P	2
Porsche	(Austria) Razoon – more than racing	Porsche 911 GT3 R (992.2)	914	(United Kingdom) Kenzie Beecroft	B	3
Porsche	(Austria) Razoon – more than racing	Porsche 911 GT3 R (992.2)	914	(Thailand) Carl Bennett	B	3
Porsche	(Austria) Razoon – more than racing	Porsche 911 GT3 R (992.2)	914	(Australia) Bryce Fullwood	B	3
Porsche	(Austria) Razoon – more than racing	Porsche 911 GT3 R (992.2)	914	(United Kingdom) Ed McDermott	B	3

Icon	Class
P	Pro Cup
G	Gold Cup
S	Silver Cup
B	Bronze Cup
PA	Pro-Am Cup
Am	Am Cup
	Independent Cup

== Race results ==
Round	Races	Pole position	Race winners	Reports
1	(Australia) Bathurst 12 Hour	(Australia) No. 222 Scott Taylor Motorsport	(Hong Kong) No. 888 Mercedes-AMG Team GMR	Report
1	(Australia) Bathurst 12 Hour	(Australia) Chaz Mostert (Australia) Thomas Randle (Australia) Cameron Waters	(Germany) Maro Engel (Canada) Mikaël Grenier (Belgium) Maxime Martin	Report
2	(Germany) Nürburgring 24 Hours	(Netherlands) No. 3 Mercedes-AMG Team Verstappen Racing	(Germany) No. 80 Mercedes-AMG Team Ravenol	Report
2	(Germany) Nürburgring 24 Hours	(Austria) Lucas Auer (Andorra) Jules Gounon (Spain) Daniel Juncadella (Netherlands) Max Verstappen	(Germany) Maro Engel (Belgium) Maxime Martin (Germany) Fabian Schiller (Germany) Luca Stolz	Report
3	(Belgium) Spa 24 Hours	(Italy) No. 51 AF Corse	(Germany) No. 80 Lionspeed GP	Report
3	(Belgium) Spa 24 Hours	(Italy) Tommaso Mosca (Denmark) Nicklas Nielsen (Italy) Alessio Rovera	(Denmark) Bastian Buus (Switzerland) Ricardo Feller (Austria) Thomas Preining	Report
4	(Japan) Suzuka 1000 km	(Australia) No. 64 Miedecke Motorsport by Team MPC	(United States) No. 8 AO by Absolute Racing	Report
4	(Japan) Suzuka 1000 km	(Germany) Christopher Mies (Norway) Dennis Olsen (Belgium) Frédéric Vervisch	(France) Julien Andlauer (Germany) Laurin Heinrich (Belgium) Alessio Picariello	Report
5	(United States) Indianapolis 8 Hour	(United States) No. 29 Turner Motorsport	(United States) No. 32 GMG Racing	Report
5	(United States) Indianapolis 8 Hour	(United States) Connor De Phillippi (United States) Robby Foley (United States) Justin Rothberg	(Turkey) Ayhancan Güven (Italy) Riccardo Pera (United States) Kyle Washington	Report

== Championship standings ==
Scoring system

Championship points were awarded for the first ten positions in each race. Entries were required to complete 75% of the winning car's race distance in order to be classified and earn points. Individual drivers were required to participate for a minimum of 25 minutes in order to earn championship points in any race. A manufacturer only received points for its two highest placed cars in each round.

Position	**1st**	**2nd**	**3rd**	**4th**	**5th**	**6th**	**7th**	**8th**	**9th**	**10th**
Points	25	18	15	12	10	8	6	4	2	1

=== Drivers' championships ===
==== Overall championship ====
The results indicate the classification relative to other drivers in the series, not the classification in the race.

Pos.	Driver	Manufacturer	BAT (Australia)	NÜR (Germany)	SPA (Belgium)	SUZ (Japan)	IND (United States)	Points
1	(Belgium) Maxime Martin	Mercedes-AMG	1	1	Ret	5	4	72
2	(Germany) Maro Engel	Mercedes-AMG	1	1	2			68
3	(Germany) Luca Stolz	Mercedes-AMG	6	1	2	5	Ret	61
4	(Germany) Laurin Heinrich	Porsche	7	3		1	5	56
5	(Turkey) Ayhancan Güven	Porsche		Ret	4	3	1	52
6	(Denmark) Bastian Buus	Porsche	5	4	1			47
7	(Switzerland) Ricardo Feller	Porsche	7	3	1			46
8	(Belgium) Alessio Picariello	Porsche	5	Ret	7	1	10	42
9	(France) Dorian Boccolacci	Porsche	2	Ret	7	3		39
10	(Germany) Max Hesse	BMW	4	2	6	Ret		38
11	(Canada) Mikaël Grenier	Mercedes-AMG	1	18	Ret	Ret	4	37
12	(United Kingdom) Dan Harper	BMW		2	6	7		32
13	(Denmark) Nicklas Nielsen	Ferrari			**3**		3	30
14	(Germany) Christopher Mies	Ford	Ret	5		**2**	Ret	28
14	(Norway) Dennis Olsen	Ford	Ret	5		**2**		28
14	(Belgium) Frédéric Vervisch	Ford		5		**2**		28
15	(Germany) Fabian Schiller	Mercedes-AMG	18	1	Ret			25
15	(Austria) Thomas Preining	Porsche		Ret	1			25
15	(France) Julien Andlauer	Porsche		Ret		1		25
15	(Italy) Riccardo Pera (United States) Kyle Washington	Porsche					1	25
16	(Denmark) Anders Fjordbach (China) Kerong Li	Porsche	2	12	26	8	9	24
17	(Italy) Valentino Rossi	BMW	3		6			23
18	(Australia) Matt Campbell	Porsche	5		4			22
19	(Brazil) Augusto Farfus	BMW	3	Ret	8	17		19
19	(Switzerland) Raffaele Marciello	BMW	3	Ret	8			19
20	(Austria) Lucas Auer	Mercedes-AMG	Ret	**15**	2			18
20	(Belgium) Dries Vanthoor (South Africa) Sheldon van der Linde	BMW		2				18
20	(United States) Connor De Phillippi (United States) Robby Foley (United States) Justin Rothberg	BMW					2	18
21	(Germany) Joel Sturm	Porsche		4	29	8		16
22	(France) Alessandro Ghiretti	Porsche		17	19	3		15
22	(Italy) Alessio Rovera	Ferrari			**3**	14		15
22	(Denmark) Frederik Schandorff	Ferrari			22		3	15
22	(Italy) Tommaso Mosca	Ferrari			**3**			15
22	(Belgium) Laurens Vanthoor	Porsche		3				15
22	(Argentina) Matías Pérez Companc	Ferrari					3	15
23	(Netherlands) "Daan Arrow"	Porsche		7				14
23	(Netherlands) "Daan Arrow"	Mercedes-AMG			18		6	14
24	(Netherlands) Maxime Oosten	BMW	4			Ret		12
24	(Netherlands) Maxime Oosten	Ford			16			12
24	(Netherlands) Nicky Catsburg (United Kingdom) Alexander Sims	Chevrolet	20			4		12
24	(China) Ruan Cunfan	BMW	4			Ret		12
24	(Denmark) Michael Christensen	Porsche		4				12
24	(France) Frédéric Makowiecki	Porsche			4			12
24	(New Zealand) Scott McLaughlin	Chevrolet				4		12
24	(United States) Michai Stephens	Mercedes-AMG					4	12
25	(Germany) Frank Stippler	Ford		5				10
25	(Indonesia) Sean Gelael (Monaco) Arthur Leclerc (France) Lilou Wadoux	Ferrari			5			10
25	(Japan) Kakunoshin Ohta	Mercedes-AMG				5		10
25	(United States) Dave Musial Jr. (New Zealand) Ryan Yardley	Porsche					5	10
26	(Belgium) Charles Weerts	BMW	11	6	11			8
26	(Andorra) Jules Gounon	Mercedes-AMG	6	**15**	Ret			8
26	(Australia) Kenny Habul	Mercedes-AMG	6			Ret		8
26	(Austria) Philipp Eng (Netherlands) Robin Frijns (Germany) Marco Wittmann	BMW		6				8
26	(Japan) Tadasuke Makino (Japan) Seita Nonaka (Japan) Takuro Shinohara	Ferrari				6		8
26	(Belgium) Jan Heylen (United States) Danny Dyszelski	Porsche					6	8
26	(Germany) Ralf Bohn (Germany) Alfred Renauer	Porsche	10		35	10	7	8
26	(Germany) Robert Renauer	Porsche	10			10	7	8
27	(Austria) Klaus Bachler	Porsche	7	Ret				6
27	(Germany) Tobias Müller	Porsche		7	Ret			6
27	(Germany) Patrick Assenheimer (Luxembourg) Dylan Pereira	Porsche		7				6
27	(United States) Anthony McIntosh (Canada) Parker Thompson	BMW				7		6
28	(Germany) Patrick Kolb	Porsche		8	17			4
28	(Austria) Max Hofer	Porsche		8	Ret			4
28	(France) Kévin Estre	Porsche		Ret			8	4
28	(New Zealand) Jaxon Evans (Italy) Davide Rigon (Brazil) Daniel Serra	Ferrari	8					4
28	(United Kingdom) Jake Hill (United Kingdom) Kyle Tilley	Porsche		8				4
28	(United Kingdom) Jake Dennis	BMW			8			4
28	(United States) Thomas Merrill	Porsche					8	4
29	(China) Ye Hongli	Porsche		12	26	24	9	2
29	(United Kingdom) Chris Froggatt (Hong Kong) Jonathan Hui	Ferrari	9					2
29	(United Kingdom) Chris Froggatt (Hong Kong) Jonathan Hui	Porsche			Ret	16		2
29	(Estonia) Martin Rump	Porsche		9	32			2
29	(Germany) Dennis Marschall	Ferrari		Ret	9			2
29	(Italy) Lorenzo Patrese (New Zealand) Ryan Wood	Ferrari	9					2
29	(United Kingdom) Alex Brundle (Germany) Ben Bünnagel	Porsche		9				2
29	(United States) Dustin Blattner (France) Mathys Jaubert (United Kingdom) Ben Tuck	Ferrari			9			2
29	(Italy) Giancarlo Fisichella (Japan) Kei Nakanishi (Japan) Shigekazu Wakisaka	Ferrari				9		2
30	(Netherlands) Roelof Bruins (Canada) Steven Cho (South Korea) Jongkyum Kim (Germany) Marco Seefried	Porsche		10				1
30	(Germany) Jens Klingmann (Germany) Tim Tramnitz (Belgium) Ugo de Wilde	BMW			10			1
30	(United States) Michael McCann Jr. (Canada) Zachary Vanier	Porsche					10	1
—	(Netherlands) Loek Hartog	Porsche		4 (Note: Loek Hartog finished the race, but did not classified for points due to did not raced above the minimum required laps.)			20	0
—	(South Africa) Jordan Pepper (South Africa) Kelvin van der Linde	BMW	11	Ret	11			0
—	(United Kingdom) Ben Green (Malaysia) Prince Abu Bakar Ibrahim (Malaysia) Prince Jefri Ibrahim	Chevrolet	13		26	11		0
—	(Switzerland) Alex Fontana	Porsche	Ret	11	17		17	0
—	(France) Nathanaël Berthon (Armenia) Artur Goroyan (Kazakhstan) Oleg Kvitka	Porsche		11				0
—	(United States) Colin Braun (United States) Michael Clark (Germany) Lars Kern	Porsche					11	0
—	(United Kingdom) David Pittard	Mercedes-AMG		Ret				0
—	(United Kingdom) David Pittard	BMW			12			0
—	(Australia) Brett Hobson (Australia) Dylan O'Keeffe (Australia) Garth Walden	Mercedes-AMG	12					0
—	(United Kingdom) Harry King	Porsche		12				0
—	(South Africa) Leyton Fourie (United Kingdom) James Kellett (United Kingdom) Darren Leung	BMW			12			0
—	(Japan) Naoki Hattori (Japan) Ryo Ogawa (Japan) Hiroki Yoshimoto	Ferrari				12		0
—	(United States) Derek DeBoer (Sweden) Hampus Ericsson (Sweden) Marcus Ericsson	BMW					12	0
—	(Australia) Jordan Love	Chevrolet	13		26			0
—	(South Africa) David Perel	Ferrari		Ret	13			0
—	(Germany) Andreas Gülden (Japan) Yuichi Nakayama (Germany) Tim Sandtler	Mercedes-AMG		13				0
—	(Italy) Alessandro Balzan (Spain) Rafael Durán (United States) Dylan Medler	Ferrari			13			0
—	(Japan) Seiji Ara (Japan) Kizuku Hirota (Japan) Tomohide Yamaguchi	BMW				13		0
—	(United States) Andy Lee (Finland) Jesse Krohn (United States) Slade Stewart	BMW					13	0
—	(Italy) Gabriele Piana	Porsche		14				0
—	(Italy) Gabriele Piana	Mercedes-AMG			18			0
—	(Germany) Thomas Kiefer	Porsche		14				0
—	(Germany) Thomas Kiefer	Ferrari			Ret			0
—	(Brazil) Eduardo Barrichello (Canada) Roman De Angelis (United Kingdom) Ian James	Mercedes-AMG	14					0
—	(Turkey) Mustafa Mehmet Kaya (Germany) Mike Stursberg	Porsche		14				0
—	(Belgium) Amaury Cordeel (Belgium) Mathieu Detry (Belgium) Matisse Lismont (Argentina) Ignacio Montenegro	BMW			14			0
—	(Japan) Yusaku Maezawa (Japan) Naoki Yokomizo	Ferrari				14		0
—	(Canada) Indy Dontje (Canada) Daniel Morad (United States) Brayton Williams	Mercedes-AMG					14	0
—	(New Zealand) Brendon Leitch	Mercedes-AMG	15					0
—	(New Zealand) Brendon Leitch	Ferrari				15		0
—	(Spain) Daniel Juncadella	Mercedes-AMG		**15**	Ret			0
—	(Republic of Ireland) Peter Dempsey	Ferrari			Ret		15	0
—	(Australia) Scott Andrews (Australia) Sergio Pires (Australia) Marcel Zalloua	Mercedes-AMG	15					0
—	(Netherlands) Max Verstappen	Mercedes-AMG		**15**				0
—	(Italy) Francesco Braschi (Belgium) Jeff Machiels (Belgium) Gilles Stadsbader (Peru) Matías Zagazeta	Ferrari			15			0
—	(Hong Kong) Liu Kai Shun (China) Song Jiajun	Ferrari				15		0
—	(Netherlands) Marc Austin (United States) Ben Keating	Mercedes-AMG					15	0
—	(Switzerland) Philip Ellis	Mercedes-AMG	18	16		Ret	Ret	0
—	(Italy) Eddie Cheever III	Porsche			Ret	16		0
—	(Australia) Zach Bates (Australia) James Koundouris (Australia) Theo Koundouris (Australia) David Russell	Mercedes-AMG	16					0
—	(Germany) Jannes Fittje (Germany) Jay Mo Härtling (Germany) Kenneth Heyer	Mercedes-AMG		16				0
—	(Philippines) Eduardo Coseteng (Germany) Max Reis (Germany) Finn Wiebelhaus	Ford			16			0
—	(United States) Jay Schreibman (Brazil) Oswaldo Negri Jr. (Denmark) Benny Simonsen	Ferrari					16	0
—	(Italy) Fabio Babini (Italy) Johannes Zelger	Porsche	Ret		28	21	17	0
—	(Australia) Kai Allen (Australia) Will Davison (Australia) Brenton Grove	Mercedes-AMG	17					0
—	(Italy) Michele Beretta	Porsche		17				0
—	(Zimbabwe) Axcil Jefferies (Canada) Bashar Mardini	Porsche			17			0
—	(Chinese Taipei) Brian Lee (Brazil) Marcelo Tomasoni	BMW				17		0
—	(France) Jordan Boisson (France) Patrick Charlaix (France) Marvin Klein	Mercedes-AMG			27		18	0
—	(United Kingdom) Chris Lulham	Mercedes-AMG		18	Ret			0
—	(Australia) Jayden Ojeda	Mercedes-AMG	18					0
—	(Germany) Marek Böckmann	Mercedes-AMG		18				0
—	(Germany) Marvin Dienst; Rinat Salikhov	Mercedes-AMG			18			0
—	(Japan) Reimei Ito (Japan) Shinji Takei (Japan) Ukyo Sasahara	Porsche				18		0
—	(Australia) Chaz Mostert (Australia) Thomas Randle (Australia) Cameron Waters	Mercedes-AMG	**19**					0
—	(Sweden) Robin Knutsson (Belgium) Gilles Magnus	Porsche			19			0
—	(Japan) Taku Bamba (Japan) Norikazu Shibata (United Kingdom) David Tan	Ferrari				19		0
—	(United States) Mitchell Green (United States) Conrad Grunewald (United Kingdom) Jamie Morrow	Ferrari					19	0
—	(New Zealand) Earl Bamber	Chevrolet	20					0
—	(Angola) Rui Andrade (Australia) Christian Mansell (Switzerland) Yannick Mettler (Hungary) Levente Révész	Mercedes-AMG			20			0
—	(Japan) Yuta Kamimura (Japan) Tsubasa Kondo (Japan) Kiyoshi Uchiyama	Porsche				20		0
—	(United States) John Gilliland (United States) Aaron Jeansonne	Porsche					20	0
—	(France) Loris Cabirou (Thailand) Tanart Sathienthirakul (Italy) Francesco Simonazzi (United Kingdom) Angus Whiteside	Porsche			21			0
—	(New Zealand) Daniel Gaunt	Porsche				21		0
—	(Denmark) Simon Birch (Denmark) Malte Ebdrup (Denmark) Conrad Laursen	Ferrari			22			0
—	(Brazil) João Paulo de Oliveira (Hong Kong) Kevin Tse (Japan) Daisuke Yamawaki	Mercedes-AMG				22		0
—	(Republic of Ireland) Reece Barr (United Kingdom) Charles Dawson (United Kingdom) Kiern Jewiss (Australia) Garnet Patterson	Mercedes-AMG			23			0
—	(Japan) Kazuto Kotaka (Japan) Hiroaki Nagai (Japan) Hibiki Taira	Porsche				23		0
—	(France) Mathieu Jaminet	Porsche			35	24		0
—	(United States) Anthony Bartone (Poland) Karol Basz (France) César Gazeau (France) Aurélien Panis	Mercedes-AMG			24			0
—	(Malaysia) Adrian D'Silva	Porsche				24		0
—	(China) Yuan Bo	Porsche			26			0
—	(Belgium) Benjamin Paque	Mercedes-AMG			27			0
—	(Germany) Nico Menzel	Porsche		Ret	28			0
—	(Japan) Hiroshi Hamaguchi	Porsche			28			0
—	(Canada) Reinhold Krahn (Switzerland) Nicolò Rosi (Italy) Niccolò Schirò	Porsche			29			0
—	(France) Antoine Doquin (Denmark) Dennis Lind (Denmark) Mikkel Gaarde Pedersen (Germany) Lenny Ried	Chevrolet			30			0
—	(United Kingdom) Kenzie Beecroft (Thailand) Carl Bennett (Australia) Bryce Fullwood (United Kingdom) Ed McDermott	Porsche			31			0
—	(Germany) Sven Müller	Porsche		Ret	32			0
—	(Hong Kong) Antares Au (Denmark) Michelle Gatting	Porsche			32			0
—	(United States) Jason Hart (United States) Scott Noble (United Kingdom) Aaron Walker (United Kingdom) Lewis Williamson	Mercedes-AMG			33			0
—	(Belgium) Armand Fumal (Australia) Bayley Hall (Australia) Andres Latorre Canon	Porsche			34			0
—	(Netherlands) Huub van Eijndhoven	Porsche			35			0
—	(Germany) Tom Kalender (Luxembourg) Gabriel Rindone (South Africa) Jarrod Waberski	Mercedes-AMG			36			0
—	(Germany) Maximilian Götz	Mercedes-AMG	Ret		Ret			0
—	(United Kingdom) Adam Christodoulou	Mercedes-AMG		Ret	Ret			0
—	(India) Arjun Maini (Switzerland) Fabio Scherer	Ford		Ret	Ret			0
—	(Netherlands) Colin Caresani	Ford		Ret				0
—	(Netherlands) Colin Caresani	Mercedes-AMG			Ret			0
—	(Germany) Tim Heinemann	Porsche		Ret				0
—	(Germany) Tim Heinemann	Ferrari			Ret			0
—	(Estonia) Ralf Aron	Mercedes-AMG	Ret					0
—	(Australia) Broc Feeney	Ford	Ret					0
—	(Germany) Hubert Haupt (Germany) Vincent Kolb (Germany) David Schumacher	Ford		Ret				0
—	(Japan) Nirei Fukuzumi (Japan) Naoya Gamou (Finland) Jesse Krohn	Mercedes-AMG		Ret				0
—	(France) Thomas Neubauer	Ferrari		Ret				0
—	(Netherlands) Thierry Vermeulen	Ferrari		Ret				0
—	(France) Thomas Drouet	Ford			Ret			0
—	(Oman) Ahmad Al Harthy (Brazil) Pedro Ebrahim (Spain) Javier Sagrera (Australia) Calan Williams	BMW			Ret			0
—	(France) Pierre-Louis Chovet (Switzerland) Rolf Ineichen	Ferrari			Ret			0
—	(Netherlands) Mex Jansen	Porsche			Ret			0
—	(United Kingdom) Alex Malykhin (Slovenia) Alexey Nesov (Italy) Enzo Trulli	Porsche			Ret			0
—	(Mexico) Alfredo Hernández (France) Stéphane Tribaudini	Mercedes-AMG			Ret			0
—	(Spain) Miguel Molina (Brazil) Custodio Toledo (France) Matthieu Vaxivière	Ferrari			Ret			0
—	(Mexico) Ian Aguilera (Brazil) Christian Hahn (Netherlands) Jop Rappange (United Kingdom) Josh Rowledge	BMW			Ret			0
—	(Netherlands) Kay van Berlo (United States) Riley Dickinson (United States) Todd Parriott	Porsche					Ret	0
—	(United States) Wyatt Brichacek (United States) Jason Daskalos	Mercedes-AMG					Ret	0
—	(United States) Scott Dollahite (United Kingdom) Alex Sedgwick	Ford					Ret	0
—	(Netherlands) Lin Hodenius (Spain) Álex Palou	Mercedes-AMG					Ret	0
—	(United States) Ross Chouest (Canada) Aaron Povoledo	Chevrolet					WD	0
Pos.	Driver	Manufacturer	BAT (Australia)	NÜR (Germany)	SPA (Belgium)	SUZ (Japan)	IND (United States)	Points

Colour	Result
Gold	Winner
Silver	Second place
Bronze	Third place
Green	Points classification
Blue	Non-points classification
Blue	Non-classified finish (NC)
Purple	Retired, not classified (Ret)
Red	Did not qualify (DNQ)
Red	Did not pre-qualify (DNPQ)
Black	Disqualified (DSQ)
White	Did not start (DNS)
White	Withdrew (WD)
White	Race cancelled (C)
Blank	Did not practice (DNP)
Blank	Did not arrive (DNA)
Blank	Excluded (EX)

**Bold** – Pole
Italics – Fastest Lap

==== Intercontinental GT Challenge Independent Cup ====
Pos.	Driver	Manufacturer	BAT (Australia)	NÜR (Germany)	SPA (Belgium)	SUZ (Japan)	IND (United States)	Points
1	(China) Kerong Li	Porsche	1	1	2	1	2	111
2	(Germany) Ralf Bohn	Porsche	4		Ret	2	1	55
3	(Malaysia) Prince Jefri Ibrahim	Chevrolet	5		1	3		50
4	(Italy) Johannes Zelger	Porsche	6		3	5	3	48
5	(Hong Kong) Jonathan Hui	Ferrari	3					27
5	(Hong Kong) Jonathan Hui	Porsche			Ret	4		27
6	(Australia) Kenny Habul	Mercedes-AMG	2			Ret		18
7	(Malaysia) Adrian D'Silva	Porsche				6		8
Pos.	Driver	Manufacturer	BAT (Australia)	NÜR (Germany)	SPA (Belgium)	SUZ (Japan)	IND (United States)	Points

=== Manufacturers' championship ===
Pos.	Manufacturer	BAT (Australia)	NÜR (Germany)	SPA (Belgium)	SUZ (Japan)	IND (United States)	Points
1	(Germany) Porsche	2	3	1	1	1	167
1	(Germany) Porsche	5	4	4	3	5	167
2	(Germany) Mercedes-AMG	1	1	2	5	4	112
2	(Germany) Mercedes-AMG	6	13	18	22	14	112
3	(Germany) BMW	3	2	6	7	2	100
3	(Germany) BMW	4	6	8	13	12	100
4	(Italy) Ferrari	8	Ret	3	6	3	66
4	(Italy) Ferrari	9		5	10	16	66
5	(United States) Ford	Ret	5	16	2	Ret	32
5	(United States) Ford		Ret	Ret			32
6	(United States) Chevrolet	13		25	4	WD	18
6	(United States) Chevrolet	20		30	11		18
Pos.	Manufacturer	BAT (Australia)	NÜR (Germany)	SPA (Belgium)	SUZ (Japan)	IND (United States)	Points

== See also ==
- 2026 British GT Championship
- 2026 GT World Challenge America
- 2026 GT World Challenge Asia
- 2026 GT World Challenge Australia
- 2026 GT World Challenge Europe Endurance Cup
- 2026 GT World Challenge Europe Sprint Cup
