= 2026 Suzuka 1000 km =

Sports car race in Suzuka, Japan

(Japan) Suzuka 1000 km 2026
Event information
- Round 4 of 5 in the 2026 Intercontinental GT Challenge
- Date: 13 September 2026
- Location: Suzuka, Mie Prefecture, Japan
- Venue: Suzuka Circuit
- Duration: 6 hours, 30 minutes
- Weather: Cloudy/dry

Results
- Laps completed: 184
- Distance: 1,068.48 km (663.92 mi)

Pole position
- Time: 1:59.277 (3 lap average)
- Team: (Australia) No. 64 Miedecke Motorsport by Team MPC
- Drivers: (Germany) Christopher Mies (Norway) Dennis Olsen (Belgium) Frédéric Vervisch

Winners
- Time: 6:31:18.239
- Team: (United States) AO by Absolute Racing
- Drivers: (France) Julien Andlauer (Germany) Laurin Heinrich (Belgium) Alessio Picariello

The 2026 Suzuka 1000 km took place on 13 September 2026 at the Suzuka Circuit in Suzuka, Japan. It was the 50th edition of the Suzuka 1000km, and the fourth round of the 2026 Intercontinental GT Challenge.

The race was dominated by the No. 8 AO by Absolute Porsche, which won the race by over 50 seconds following Laurin Heinrich's passes on key contenders during the middle stage of the race.

== Entry list ==
A provisional entry list was announced on 13 August, featuring 28 entries. Eight manufacturers were represented: 10 Porsche cars, 5 Ferrari cars, 4 BMW cars, 3 Mercedes cars, 2 Corvette cars, 2 Nissan cars, and 1 car from Lexus and Ford. An updated list was revealed on 4 September, with the grid expanded to 30 entries following the late entries of Team Daishin's Nissan, and Harmony Racing's Ferrari.

Super GT teams were allowed to enter GTA-GT300 regulation vehicles after an agreement between SRO and the GT Association (GTA) was reached in late 2024, however, no GTA-GT300 cars entered the race.

No.	Entrant	Car	Driver 1	Driver 2	Driver 3
Pro (9 entries)
2	(Malaysia) Johor Motorsport Racing JMR	Chevrolet Corvette Z06 GT3.R	(Netherlands) Nicky Catsburg	(United States) Scott McLaughlin (Note: Scott McLaughlin was born in New Zealand but competed with an ACCUS-FIA license as a North Carolina-domeciled driver.)	(United Kingdom) Alexander Sims
7	(Hong Kong) Absolute Racing	Porsche 911 GT3 R (992.2)	(France) Dorian Boccolacci	(France) Alessandro Ghiretti	(Turkey) Ayhancan Güven
8	(United States) AO by Absolute Racing	Porsche 911 GT3 R (992.2)	(France) Julien Andlauer	(Germany) Laurin Heinrich	(Belgium) Alessio Picariello
45	(Japan) Ponos Racing	Ferrari 296 GT3 Evo	(Japan) Tadasuke Makino	(Japan) Seita Nonaka	(Japan) Takuro Shinohara
64	(Australia) Miedecke Motorsport by Team MPC	Ford Mustang GT3 Evo	(Germany) Christopher Mies	(Norway) Dennis Olsen	(Belgium) Frédéric Vervisch
75	(Australia) 75 Express	Mercedes-AMG GT3 Evo	(Switzerland) Philip Ellis	(Canada) Mikaël Grenier	(United States) Kenny Habul (Note: Kenny Habul is an Australian driver that competes under the American license.)
77	(Hong Kong) Mercedes-AMG Team Craft-Bamboo Racing	Mercedes-AMG GT3 Evo	(Belgium) Maxime Martin	(Japan) Kakunoshin Ohta	(Germany) Luca Stolz
96	(Japan) K-tunes Racing	Lexus RC F GT3	(Japan) Takamitsu Matsui	(Japan) Sena Sakaguchi	(Japan) Hideki Yamauchi
500	(Japan) Team 5ZIGEN	Nissan GT-R Nismo GT3	(Japan) Katsumasa Chiyo	(Japan) Kazuki Hiramine	(Japan) Atsushi Miyake
Bronze (14 entries)
5	(Japan) Plus with BMW M Team Studie	BMW M4 GT3 Evo	(Japan) Seiji Ara	(Japan) Kizuku Hirota	(Japan) Tomohide Yamaguchi
9	(Japan) Bingo Racing with LM Corsa	Porsche 911 GT3 R (992.2)	(Japan) Reimei Ito	(Japan) Ukyo Sasahara	(Japan) Shinji Takei
18	(Japan) Porsche Center Okazaki Nine Racing	Porsche 911 GT3 R (992.2)	(Japan) Kazuto Kotaka	(Japan) Hiroaki Nagai	(Japan) Hibiki Taira
25	(Japan) Porsche Center Okazaki NK Racing	Porsche 911 GT3 R (992.2)	(Japan) Yuta Kamimura	(Japan) Tsubasa Kondo	(Japan) Kiyoshi Uchiyama
61	(New Zealand) EBM Giga Racing	Porsche 911 GT3 R (992.2)	(Malaysia) Adrian D'Silva	(France) Mathieu Jaminet	(China) Leo Ye Hongli
69	(Belgium) Team WRT	BMW M4 GT3 Evo	(United Kingdom) Dan Harper	(United States) Anthony McIntosh	(Canada) Parker Thompson
72	(China) Harmony Racing	Ferrari 296 GT3 Evo	(New Zealand) Brendon Leitch	(Hong Kong) Liu Kai Shun	(China) Song Jiajun
80	(Japan) LM Corsa	Ferrari 296 GT3 Evo	(Japan) Naoki Hattori	(Japan) Ryo Ogawa	(Japan) Hiroki Yoshimoto
81	(Japan) Team Daishin	Nissan GT-R Nismo GT3	(Japan) Kiyoto Fujinami	(Japan) Tsugio Matsuda	(Japan) Ryuichiro Ohyagi
86	(Denmark) High Class Racing	Porsche 911 GT3 R (992.2)	(Denmark) Anders Fjordbach	(United States) Kerong Li (Note: Kerong Li is a Chinese driver that competes under the American license.)	(Germany) Joel Sturm
89	(China) Team KRC	BMW M4 GT3 Evo	(China) Ruan Cunfan	(Germany) Max Hesse	(Netherlands) Maxime Oosten
91	(Germany) Herberth Motorsport	Porsche 911 GT3 R (992.2)	(Germany) Ralf Bohn	(Germany) Alfred Renauer	(Germany) Robert Renauer
93	(United Kingdom) Ziggo Sport Tempesta Racing	Porsche 911 GT3 R (992.2)	(Italy) Eddie Cheever III	(United Kingdom) Christopher Froggatt	(Hong Kong) Jonathan Hui
555	(Japan) Maezawa Racing	Ferrari 296 GT3 Evo	(Japan) Yusaku Maezawa	(Italy) Alessio Rovera	(Japan) Naoki Yokomizo
Pro-Am (6 entries)
10	(China) Team KRC	BMW M4 GT3 Evo	(Brazil) Augusto Farfus	(Chinese Taipei) Brian Lee	(Brazil) Marcelo Tomasoni
28	(Hong Kong) Craft-Bamboo Racing	Mercedes-AMG GT3 Evo	(Brazil) João Paulo de Oliveira	(Hong Kong) Kevin Tse	(Japan) Daisuke Yamawaki
60	(Japan) LM Corsa	Ferrari 296 GT3 Evo	(Italy) Giancarlo Fisichella	(Japan) Kei Nakanishi	(Japan) Shigekazu Wakisaka
79	(San Marino) Tsunami RT	Porsche 911 GT3 R (992.2)	(Italy) Fabio Babini	(New Zealand) Daniel Gaunt	(Italy) Johannes Zelger
99	(Malaysia) Johor Motorsport Racing JMR	Chevrolet Corvette Z06 GT3.R	(United Kingdom) Ben Green	(Malaysia) Prince Abu Bakar Ibrahim	(Malaysia) Prince Jefri Ibrahim
181	(Japan) Norik Racing	Ferrari 296 GT3 Evo	(Japan) "Norik"	(Japan) Taku Bamba	(United Kingdom) David Tan
Am (1 entry)
360	(Japan) RunUp Sports	Nissan GT-R Nismo GT3	(Japan) Masaaki Nishikawa	(Japan) Atsushi Tanaka	(Japan) Tetsuya Tanaka

- Kei Cozzolino, Yorikatsu Tsujiko and Yusuke Yamasaki were scheduled to compete in the event, but the team reshuffled its lineup and moved from Pro-Am to Pro Class prior to the start of the event.
- Thomas Neubauer, who had joined Maezawa Racing for the race, had to be withdrawn after he suffered a complex fracture of his left collarbone in a cycling accident, and was replaced by Alessio Rovera.

== Qualifying ==
The grid was determined by the average lap time of all three drivers. Pole position entries in each class are denoted in bold.

Pos	Class	No.	Team	Car	Drivers	Time	Avg. Time	Grid
1	P	**64**	**(Australia) Miedecke Motorsport by Team MPC**	**Ford Mustang GT3 Evo**	**(Germany) Christopher Mies**	**1:59.003**	**1:59.277**	1
1	P	**64**	**(Australia) Miedecke Motorsport by Team MPC**	**Ford Mustang GT3 Evo**	**(Norway) Dennis Olsen**	**1:59.218**	**1:59.277**	1
1	P	**64**	**(Australia) Miedecke Motorsport by Team MPC**	**Ford Mustang GT3 Evo**	**(Belgium) Frédéric Vervisch**	**1:59.612**	**1:59.277**	1
2	P	45	(Japan) Ponos Racing	Ferrari 296 GT3 Evo	(Japan) Seita Nonaka	1:58.523	1:59.313	2
2	P	45	(Japan) Ponos Racing	Ferrari 296 GT3 Evo	(Japan) Tadasuke Makino	1:59.342	1:59.313	2
2	P	45	(Japan) Ponos Racing	Ferrari 296 GT3 Evo	(Japan) Takuro Shinohara	2:00.074	1:59.313	2
3	P	7	(Hong Kong) Absolute Racing	Porsche 911 GT3 R (992.2)	(France) Alessandro Ghiretti	1:59.373	1:59.422	3
3	P	7	(Hong Kong) Absolute Racing	Porsche 911 GT3 R (992.2)	(Turkey) Ayhancan Güven	1:59.390	1:59.422	3
3	P	7	(Hong Kong) Absolute Racing	Porsche 911 GT3 R (992.2)	(France) Dorian Boccolacci	1:59.505	1:59.422	3
4	P	8	(United States) AO by Absolute Racing	Porsche 911 GT3 R (992.2)	(Germany) Laurin Heinrich	1:59.054	1:59.516	6 (Note: No. 8 of AO Racing by Absolute Racing had a 2-place grid position penalty as their car was not at the pit lane during the scheduled pit walk.)
4	P	8	(United States) AO by Absolute Racing	Porsche 911 GT3 R (992.2)	(Belgium) Alessio Picariello	1:59.532	1:59.516	6
4	P	8	(United States) AO by Absolute Racing	Porsche 911 GT3 R (992.2)	(France) Julien Andlauer	1:59.963	1:59.516	6
5	B	**89**	**(China) Team KRC**	**BMW M4 GT3 Evo**	**(Germany) Max Hesse**	**1:59.010**	**1:59.741‡**	4
5	B	**89**	**(China) Team KRC**	**BMW M4 GT3 Evo**	**(Netherlands) Maxime Oosten**	**1:59.316**	**1:59.741‡**	4
5	B	**89**	**(China) Team KRC**	**BMW M4 GT3 Evo**	**(China) Ruan Cunfan**	**2:00.899**	**1:59.741‡**	4
6	B	69	(Belgium) Team WRT	BMW M4 GT3 Evo	(United Kingdom) Dan Harper	1:59.061	1:59.774	11 (Note: No. 69 of Team WRT had a 5-place grid position penalty as Parker Thompson was caught speeding during Red Flags in Friday practice.)
6	B	69	(Belgium) Team WRT	BMW M4 GT3 Evo	(Canada) Parker Thompson	1:59.125	1:59.774	11
6	B	69	(Belgium) Team WRT	BMW M4 GT3 Evo	(United States) Anthony McIntosh	2:01.137	1:59.774	11
7	P	75	(Australia) 75 Express	Mercedes-AMG GT3 Evo	(Switzerland) Philip Ellis	1:59.108	1:59.820	8 (Note: No. 75 of 75 Express had a 3-place grid position penalty as Kenny Habul was caught speeding during Red Flags in Saturday Pre-Qualifying.)
7	P	75	(Australia) 75 Express	Mercedes-AMG GT3 Evo	(Canada) Mikaël Grenier	1:59.149	1:59.820	8
7	P	75	(Australia) 75 Express	Mercedes-AMG GT3 Evo	(United States) Kenny Habul	2:01.204	1:59.820	8
8	P	500	(Japan) Team 5ZIGEN	Nissan GT-R Nismo GT3	(Japan) Atsushi Miyake	1:59.341	1:59.828	5
8	P	500	(Japan) Team 5ZIGEN	Nissan GT-R Nismo GT3	(Japan) Katsumasa Chiyo	1:59.788	1:59.828	5
8	P	500	(Japan) Team 5ZIGEN	Nissan GT-R Nismo GT3	(Japan) Kazuki Hiramine	2:00.355	1:59.828	5
9	P	2	(Malaysia) Johor Motorsports Racing JMR	Chevrolet Corvette Z06 GT3.R	(United States) Scott McLaughlin	2:00.075	2:00.298	10 (Note: No. 2 of Johor Motorsports Racing JMR had a 2-place grid position penalty as Scott McLaughlin was caught speeding during Red Flags in Saturday Qualifying.)
9	P	2	(Malaysia) Johor Motorsports Racing JMR	Chevrolet Corvette Z06 GT3.R	(Netherlands) Nicky Catsburg	2:00.358	2:00.298	10
9	P	2	(Malaysia) Johor Motorsports Racing JMR	Chevrolet Corvette Z06 GT3.R	(United Kingdom) Alexander Sims	2:00.462	2:00.298	10
10	B	80	(Japan) LM Corsa	Ferrari 296 GT3 Evo	(Japan) Ryo Ogawa	1:59.618	2:00.513	7
10	B	80	(Japan) LM Corsa	Ferrari 296 GT3 Evo	(Japan) Hiroki Yoshimoto	2:00.596	2:00.513	7
10	B	80	(Japan) LM Corsa	Ferrari 296 GT3 Evo	(Japan) Naoki Hattori	2:01.326	2:00.513	7
11	B	86	(Denmark) High Class Racing	Porsche 911 GT3 R (992.2)	(Germany) Joel Sturm	1:59.571	2:00.530	9
11	B	86	(Denmark) High Class Racing	Porsche 911 GT3 R (992.2)	(Denmark) Anders Fjordbach	2:00.278	2:00.530	9
11	B	86	(Denmark) High Class Racing	Porsche 911 GT3 R (992.2)	(United States) Kerong Li	2:01.741	2:00.530	9
12	B	555	(Japan) Maezawa Racing	Ferrari 296 GT3 Evo	(Italy) Alessio Rovera	1:58.950	2:00.570	12
12	B	555	(Japan) Maezawa Racing	Ferrari 296 GT3 Evo	(Japan) Naoki Yokomizo	2:00.508	2:00.570	12
12	B	555	(Japan) Maezawa Racing	Ferrari 296 GT3 Evo	(Japan) Yusaku Maezawa	2:02.254	2:00.570	12
13	PA	**60**	**(Japan) LM corsa**	**Ferrari 296 GT3 Evo**	**(Italy) Giancarlo Fisichella**	**1:59.803**	**2:00.663‡**	16 (Note: No. 60 of LM corsa had a 3-place grid position penalty as Shigekazu Wakisaka was caught speeding during Red Flags in Saturday Qualifying.)
13	PA	**60**	**(Japan) LM corsa**	**Ferrari 296 GT3 Evo**	**(Japan) Shigekazu Wakisaka**	**2:00.182**	**2:00.663‡**	16
13	PA	**60**	**(Japan) LM corsa**	**Ferrari 296 GT3 Evo**	**(Japan) Kei Nakanishi**	**2:02.005**	**2:00.663‡**	16
14	B	91	(Germany) Herberth Motorsport	Porsche 911 GT3 R (992.2)	(Germany) Robert Renauer	1:59.879	2:00.698	19 (Note: No. 91 of Herberth Motorsport had a 5-place grid position penalty as Ralf Bohn overtook another car under the yellow flag in Saturday Qualifying.)
14	B	91	(Germany) Herberth Motorsport	Porsche 911 GT3 R (992.2)	(Germany) Alfred Renauer	2:00.112	2:00.698	19
14	B	91	(Germany) Herberth Motorsport	Porsche 911 GT3 R (992.2)	(Germany) Ralf Bohn	2:02.103	2:00.698	19
15	B	93	(United Kingdom) Ziggo Sport Tempesta Racing	Porsche 911 GT3 R (992.2)	(Italy) Eddie Cheever III	2:00.134	2:00.729	13
15	B	93	(United Kingdom) Ziggo Sport Tempesta Racing	Porsche 911 GT3 R (992.2)	(United Kingdom) Christopher Froggatt	2:00.587	2:00.729	13
15	B	93	(United Kingdom) Ziggo Sport Tempesta Racing	Porsche 911 GT3 R (992.2)	(Hong Kong) Jonathan Hui	2:01.466	2:00.729	13
16	B	72	(China) Harmony Racing	Ferrari 296 GT3 Evo	(New Zealand) Brendon Leitch	1:59.091	2:01.068	18 (Note: No. 72 of Harmony Racing had a 3-place grid position penalty as Song Jiajun was caught speeding during Red Flags in Saturday Pre-Qualifying.)
16	B	72	(China) Harmony Racing	Ferrari 296 GT3 Evo	(Hong Kong) Liu Kai Shun	2:00.572	2:01.068	18
16	B	72	(China) Harmony Racing	Ferrari 296 GT3 Evo	(China) Song Jiajun	2:03.543	2:01.068	18
17	B	5	(Japan) Plus with BMW M Team Studie	BMW M4 GT3 Evo	(Japan) Seiji Ara	2:00.145	2:01.075	14
17	B	5	(Japan) Plus with BMW M Team Studie	BMW M4 GT3 Evo	(Japan) Kizuku Hirota	2:01.360	2:01.075	14
17	B	5	(Japan) Plus with BMW M Team Studie	BMW M4 GT3 Evo	(Japan) Tomohide Yamaguchi	2:01.720	2:01.075	14
18	B	25	(Japan) Porsche Center Okazaki NK Racing	Porsche 911 GT3 R (991.2)	(Japan) Tsubasa Kondo	1:59.834	2:01.092	15
18	B	25	(Japan) Porsche Center Okazaki NK Racing	Porsche 911 GT3 R (991.2)	(Japan) Yuta Kamimura	2:00.737	2:01.092	15
18	B	25	(Japan) Porsche Center Okazaki NK Racing	Porsche 911 GT3 R (991.2)	(Japan) Kiyoshi Uchiyama	2:02.705	2:01.092	15
19	B	81	(Japan) Team Daishin	Nissan GT-R Nismo GT3	(Japan) Kiyoto Fujinami	2:00.377	2:01.185	17
19	B	81	(Japan) Team Daishin	Nissan GT-R Nismo GT3	(Japan) Tsugio Matsuda	2:00.554	2:01.185	17
19	B	81	(Japan) Team Daishin	Nissan GT-R Nismo GT3	(Japan) Ryuichiro Ohyagi	2:02.626	2:01.185	17
20	P	96	(Japan) K-tunes Racing	Lexus RC F GT3	(Japan) Sena Sakaguchi	2:01.020	2:01.315	20
20	P	96	(Japan) K-tunes Racing	Lexus RC F GT3	(Japan) Takamitsu Matsui	2:01.217	2:01.315	20
20	P	96	(Japan) K-tunes Racing	Lexus RC F GT3	(Japan) Hideki Yamauchi	2:01.710	2:01.315	20
21	PA	28	(Hong Kong) Craft-Bamboo Racing	Mercedes-AMG GT3 Evo	(Brazil) João Paulo de Oliveira	1:59.521	2:01.603	21
21	PA	28	(Hong Kong) Craft-Bamboo Racing	Mercedes-AMG GT3 Evo	(Hong Kong) Kevin Tse	2:02.283	2:01.603	21
21	PA	28	(Hong Kong) Craft-Bamboo Racing	Mercedes-AMG GT3 Evo	(Japan) Daisuke Yamawaki	2:03.005	2:01.603	21
22	B	61	(New Zealand) EBM Giga Racing	Porsche 911 GT3 R (992.2)	(France) Mathieu Jaminet	1:59.398	2:01.807	22
22	B	61	(New Zealand) EBM Giga Racing	Porsche 911 GT3 R (992.2)	(China) Leo Ye Hongli	1:59.790	2:01.807	22
22	B	61	(New Zealand) EBM Giga Racing	Porsche 911 GT3 R (992.2)	(Malaysia) Adrian D'Silva	2:06.235	2:01.807	22
23	PA	99	(Malaysia) Johor Motorsports Racing JMR	Chevrolet Corvette Z06 GT3.R	(United Kingdom) Ben Green	2:00.413	2:01.901	23
23	PA	99	(Malaysia) Johor Motorsports Racing JMR	Chevrolet Corvette Z06 GT3.R	(Malaysia) Prince Abu Bakar Ibrahim	2:02.664	2:01.901	23
23	PA	99	(Malaysia) Johor Motorsports Racing JMR	Chevrolet Corvette Z06 GT3.R	(Malaysia) Prince Jefri Ibrahim	2:02.628	2:01.901	23
24	B	9	(Japan) Bingo Racing with LM corsa	Porsche 911 GT3 R (992.2)	(Japan) Ukyo Sasahara	1:59.824	2:01.921	24
24	B	9	(Japan) Bingo Racing with LM corsa	Porsche 911 GT3 R (992.2)	(Japan) Reimei Ito	2:05.728	2:01.921	24
24	B	9	(Japan) Bingo Racing with LM corsa	Porsche 911 GT3 R (992.2)	(Japan) Shinji Takei	2:00.213	2:01.921	24
25	PA	10	(China) Team KRC	BMW M4 GT3 Evo	(Brazil) Augusto Farfus	2:00.611	2:02.132	25
25	PA	10	(China) Team KRC	BMW M4 GT3 Evo	(Chinese Taipei) Brian Lee	2:02.357	2:02.132	25
25	PA	10	(China) Team KRC	BMW M4 GT3 Evo	(Brazil) Marcelo Tomasoni	2:03.429	2:02.132	25
26	PA	79	(San Marino) Tsunami RT	Porsche 911 GT3 R (992.2)	(Italy) Fabio Babini	2:01.732	2:02.701	27
26	PA	79	(San Marino) Tsunami RT	Porsche 911 GT3 R (992.2)	(New Zealand) Daniel Gaunt	2:02.698	2:02.701	27
26	PA	79	(San Marino) Tsunami RT	Porsche 911 GT3 R (992.2)	(Italy) Johannes Zelger	2:03.673	2:02.701	27
27	PA	181	(Japan) Norik Racing	Ferrari 296 GT3 Evo	(Japan) Taku Bamba	2:00.835	2:02.926	26
27	PA	181	(Japan) Norik Racing	Ferrari 296 GT3 Evo	(United Kingdom) David Tan	2:02.311	2:02.926	26
27	PA	181	(Japan) Norik Racing	Ferrari 296 GT3 Evo	(Japan) "Norik"	2:05.634	2:02.926	26
28	B	18	(Japan) Porsche Center Okazaki Nine Racing	Porsche 911 GT3 R (991.2)	(Japan) Hibiki Taira	2:01.209	2:02.182	PL
28	B	18	(Japan) Porsche Center Okazaki Nine Racing	Porsche 911 GT3 R (991.2)	(Japan) Hiroaki Nagai	2:03.155	2:02.182	PL
28	B	18	(Japan) Porsche Center Okazaki Nine Racing	Porsche 911 GT3 R (991.2)	(Japan) Kazuto Kotaka	No time set	2:02.182	PL
DSQ	P	77	(Hong Kong) Mercedes-AMG Team Craft-Bamboo Racing	Mercedes-AMG GT3 Evo	(Japan) Kakunoshin Ohta	~~1:58.455~~	~~1:58.696~~	28 (Note: No. 77 of Mercedes-AMG Team Craft-Bamboo Racing set the fastest average lap, but was disqualified as the car was underweight by 2.5 kilograms.)
DSQ	P	77	(Hong Kong) Mercedes-AMG Team Craft-Bamboo Racing	Mercedes-AMG GT3 Evo	(Belgium) Maxime Martin	~~1:58.714~~	~~1:58.696~~	28
DSQ	P	77	(Hong Kong) Mercedes-AMG Team Craft-Bamboo Racing	Mercedes-AMG GT3 Evo	(Germany) Luca Stolz	~~1:58.920~~	~~1:58.696~~	28
DNS	Am	360	(Japan) RunUp Sports	Nissan GT-R Nismo GT3	(Japan) Masaaki Nishikawa	Did not start	No time set	PL
DNS	Am	360	(Japan) RunUp Sports	Nissan GT-R Nismo GT3	(Japan) Atsushi Tanaka	Did not start	No time set	PL
DNS	Am	360	(Japan) RunUp Sports	Nissan GT-R Nismo GT3	(Japan) Tetsuya Tanaka	Did not start	No time set	PL

Icon	Class
**P**	Pro Cup
**S**	Silver Cup
**B**	Bronze Cup
**PA**	Pro-Am Cup
**Am**	Am Cup

== Race results ==
Class winners are denoted in bold and with ‡

Pos	Class	PIC	No.	Team	Drivers	Car	Laps	Time/Retired
1	P	**1**	**8**	**(United States) AO by Absolute Racing**	**(France) Julien Andlauer (Germany) Laurin Heinrich (Belgium) Alessio Picariello**	**Porsche 911 GT3 R (992.2)**	**184**	**6:31:18.239‡**
2	P	2	64	(Australia) Miedecke Motorsport by Team MPC	(Germany) Christopher Mies (Norway) Dennis Olsen (Belgium) Frédéric Vervisch	Ford Mustang GT3 Evo	184	+51.416
3	P	3	7	(Hong Kong) Absolute Racing	(France) Dorian Boccolacci (France) Alessandro Ghiretti (Turkey) Ayhancan Güven	Porsche 911 GT3 R (992.2)	184	+59.979
4	P	4	2	(Malaysia) Johor Motorsports Racing JMR	(Netherlands) Nicky Catsburg (United States) Scott McLaughlin (United Kingdom) Alexander Sims	Chevrolet Corvette Z06 GT3.R	184	+1:07.503
5	P	5	77	(Hong Kong) Mercedes-AMG Team Craft-Bamboo Racing	(Belgium) Maxime Martin (Japan) Kakunoshin Ohta (Germany) Luca Stolz	Mercedes-AMG GT3 Evo	183	+1 lap
6	P	6	45	(Japan) Ponos Racing	(Japan) Tadasuke Makino (Japan) Seita Nonaka (Japan) Takuro Shinohara	Ferrari 296 GT3 Evo	182	+2 laps
7	B	**1**	**69**	**(Belgium) Team WRT**	**(United Kingdom) Dan Harper (United States) Anthony McIntosh (Canada) Parker Thompson**	**BMW M4 GT3 Evo**	**182**	**+2 laps‡**
8	B	2	86	(Denmark) High Class Racing	(Denmark) Anders Fjordbach (United States) Kerong Li (Germany) Joel Sturm	Porsche 911 GT3 R (992.2)	181	+3 laps
9	P	7	96	(Japan) K-tunes Racing	(Japan) Takamitsu Matsui (Japan) Sena Sakaguchi (Japan) Hideki Yamauchi	Lexus RC F GT3	181	+3 laps
10	PA	**1**	**60**	**(Japan) LM corsa**	**(Italy) Giancarlo Fisichella (Japan) Shigekazu Wakisaka (Japan) Kei Nakanishi**	**Ferrari 296 GT3 Evo**	**181**	**+3 laps‡**
11	B	3	91	(Germany) Herberth Motorsport	(Germany) Robert Renauer (Germany) Alfred Renauer (Germany) Ralf Bohn	Porsche 911 GT3 R (992.2)	181	+3 laps
12	PA	2	99	(Malaysia) Johor Motorsports Racing JMR	(United Kingdom) Ben Green (Malaysia) Prince Abu Bakar Ibrahim (Malaysia) Prince Jefri Ibrahim	Chevrolet Corvette Z06 GT3.R	180	+4 laps
13	B	4	80	(Japan) LM Corsa	(Japan) Naoki Hattori (Japan) Ryo Ogawa (Japan) Hiroki Yoshimoto	Ferrari 296 GT3 Evo	180	+4 laps
14	B	5	5	(Japan) Plus with BMW M Team Studie	(Japan) Seiji Ara (Japan) Kizuku Hirota (Japan) Tomohide Yamaguchi	BMW M4 GT3 Evo	180	+4 laps
15	B	6	555	(Japan) Maezawa Racing	(Japan) Yusaku Maezawa (Italy) Alessio Rovera (Japan) Naoki Yokomizo	Ferrari 296 GT3 Evo	180	+4 laps
16	B	7	81	(Japan) Team Daishin	(Japan) Kiyoto Fujinami (Japan) Tsugio Matsuda (Japan) Ryuichiro Ohyagi	Nissan GT-R Nismo GT3	180	+4 laps
17	B	8	72	(China) Harmony Racing	(New Zealand) Brendon Leitch (Hong Kong) Liu Kai Shun (China) Song Jiajun	Ferrari 296 GT3 Evo	180	+4 laps
18	B	9	93	(United Kingdom) Ziggo Sport Tempesta Racing	(Italy) Eddie Cheever III (United Kingdom) Christopher Froggatt (Hong Kong) Jonathan Hui	Porsche 911 GT3 R (992.2)	180	+4 laps
19	P	8	500	(Japan) Team 5ZIGEN	(Japan) Katsumasa Chiyo (Japan) Kazuki Hiramine (Japan) Atsushi Miyake	Nissan GT-R Nismo GT3	179	+5 laps
20	PA	3	10	(China) Team KRC	(Brazil) Augusto Farfus (Chinese Taipei) Brian Lee (Brazil) Marcelo Tomasoni	BMW M4 GT3 Evo	179	+5 laps
21	B	10	9	(Japan) Bingo Racing with LM corsa	(Japan) Reimei Ito (Japan) Shinji Takei (Japan) Ukyo Sasahara	Porsche 911 GT3 R (992.2)	178	+6 laps
22	PA	4	181	(Japan) Norik Racing	(Japan) Norik (Japan) Taku Bamba (United Kingdom) David Tan	Ferrari 296 GT3 Evo	178	+6 laps
23	B	11	25	(Japan) Porsche Center Okazaki NK Racing	(Japan) Yuta Kamimura (Japan) Tsubasa Kondo (Japan) Kiyoshi Uchiyama	Porsche 911 GT3 R (992.2)	178	+6 laps
24	PA	5	79	(San Marino) Tsunami RT	(Italy) Fabio Babini (New Zealand) Daniel Gaunt (Italy) Johannes Zelger	Porsche 911 GT3 R (992.2)	177	+7 laps
25	PA	6	28	(Hong Kong) Craft-Bamboo Racing	(Brazil) João Paulo de Oliveira (Hong Kong) Kevin Tse (Japan) Daisuke Yamawaki	Mercedes-AMG GT3 Evo	175	+9 laps
26	B	12	18	(Japan) Porsche Center Okazaki Nine Racing	(Japan) Kazuto Kotaka (Japan) Hiroaki Nagai (Japan) Hibiki Taira	Porsche 911 GT3 R (992.2)	142	+42 laps
27	B	13	61	(New Zealand) EBM Giga Racing	(Malaysia) Adrian D'Silva (France) Mathieu Jaminet (China) Leo Ye Hongli	Porsche 911 GT3 R (992.2)	135	+49 laps (Note: The No. 61 Porsche retired from the race after 135 laps due to an ABS failure. However as the car had completed over 70% of the race distance, it was classified in the final result.)
28	Am	**1**	**360**	**(Japan) RunUp Sports**	**(Japan) Masaaki Nishikawa (Japan) Atsushi Tanaka (Japan) Tetsuya Tanaka**	**Nissan GT-R Nismo GT3**	**134**	**+50 laps‡**
DNF	B	DNF	89	(China) Team KRC	(Germany) Max Hesse (Netherlands) Maxime Oosten (China) Ruan Cunfan	BMW M4 GT3 Evo	85	Mechanical
DNF	P	DNF	75	(Australia) 75 Express	(Switzerland) Philip Ellis (Canada) Mikaël Grenier (United States) Kenny Habul	Mercedes-AMG GT3 Evo	36	Accident damage

Icon	Class
**P**	Pro Cup
**S**	Silver Cup
**B**	Bronze Cup
**PA**	Pro-Am Cup
**Am**	Am Cup

== Notes ==
Intercontinental GT Challenge
Previous race: 2026 24 Hours of Spa	2026 season	Next race: 2026 Indianapolis 8 Hours
