= Intercontinental GT Challenge =

SRO Group sports car racing series

- Category: Grand tourer Endurance racing
- Region: International
- Inaugural season: 2016
- Tyre suppliers: Pirelli
- Drivers' champion: (Belgium) Maxime Martin
- Makes' champion: (Germany) Porsche
- Official website: intercontinentalgtchallenge.com

The Intercontinental GT Challenge (IGTC) is a sports car racing series developed by the SRO Group in 2016. It consists of international endurance races for grand tourer racing cars complying with the FIA's GT3 regulations.

== Format ==
The series is aimed at manufacturers. Instead of fielding their own cars, manufacturers support local teams in selected events to gain points. Four manufacturers took part in the inaugural series in 2016: Audi, Bentley, McLaren and Mercedes.

The races may be stand-alone events, like the Suzuka 1000km and the Bathurst 12 Hour, or part of another championship, like the 24 Hours of Spa and Indianapolis 8 Hour, but they are all contested by cars complying with the same technical regulations.

== Champions ==
The title is awarded to the manufacturer with the highest points tally. A manufacturer can enter up to four cars in any event but only receives points for its two highest placed cars. Drivers’ titles are awarded in the Pro category and the Am category for drivers that are rated bronze by the FIA's ranking system.

=== Manufacturers' championship ===
Year	GT3	GT4
2016	(Germany) Audi	Not held
2017	(Germany) Audi	(Germany) Porsche
2018	(Germany) Audi	Not held
2019	(Germany) Porsche	Not held
2020	(Germany) Porsche	Not held
2021	(Germany) Audi	Not held
2022	(Germany) Mercedes-AMG	Not held
2023	(Germany) Mercedes-AMG	Not held
2024	(Germany) Porsche	Not held
2025	(Germany) BMW	Not held
2026	(Germany) Porsche	Not held

=== Drivers' championship ===
Year	Drivers	Am Drivers (2016) Bronze Drivers (2018–2019) Pro-Am Drivers (2021–22) Independent Cup (2023–)
2016	(Belgium) Laurens Vanthoor (Audi)	(France) Thierry Cornac (Porsche) (Australia) Steve McLaughlan (Audi)
2017	(Germany) Markus Winkelhock (Audi)	Not held
2018	(France) Tristan Vautier (Mercedes-AMG)	(Australia) Kenny Habul (Mercedes-AMG)
2019	(Norway) Dennis Olsen (Porsche)	(Australia) Kenny Habul (Mercedes-AMG)
2020	(Netherlands) Nicky Catsburg (BMW) (Brazil) Augusto Farfus (BMW)	Not held
2021	(France) Côme Ledogar (Ferrari) (Italy) Alessandro Pier Guidi (Ferrari)	(Canada) Mikaël Grenier (Mercedes-AMG) (Australia) Kenny Habul (Mercedes-AMG) (Austria) Martin Konrad (Mercedes-AMG)
2022	(Spain) Daniel Juncadella (Mercedes-AMG)	(Australia) Kenny Habul (Mercedes-AMG) (Austria) Martin Konrad (Mercedes-AMG)
2023	(Andorra) Jules Gounon (Mercedes-AMG)	(Hong Kong) Jonathan Hui (Mercedes-AMG/McLaren/Ferrari)
2024	(Belgium) Charles Weerts (BMW)	(Hong Kong) Antares Au (Porsche)
2025	(South Africa) Kelvin van der Linde (BMW)	(Australia) Kenny Habul (Mercedes-AMG)
2026	(Belgium) Maxime Martin (Mercedes-AMG)	(China) Kerong Li (Porsche)

== See also ==
- Bathurst 12 Hour
- 24 Hours of Spa
- Sepang 12 Hours
- Suzuka 1000km
- California 8 Hours
- Kyalami 9 Hours
- Indianapolis 8 Hour
- Gulf 12 Hours
- Nürburgring 24 Hours
