= 2026 GT World Challenge Europe =

13th season of the GT World Challenge Europe

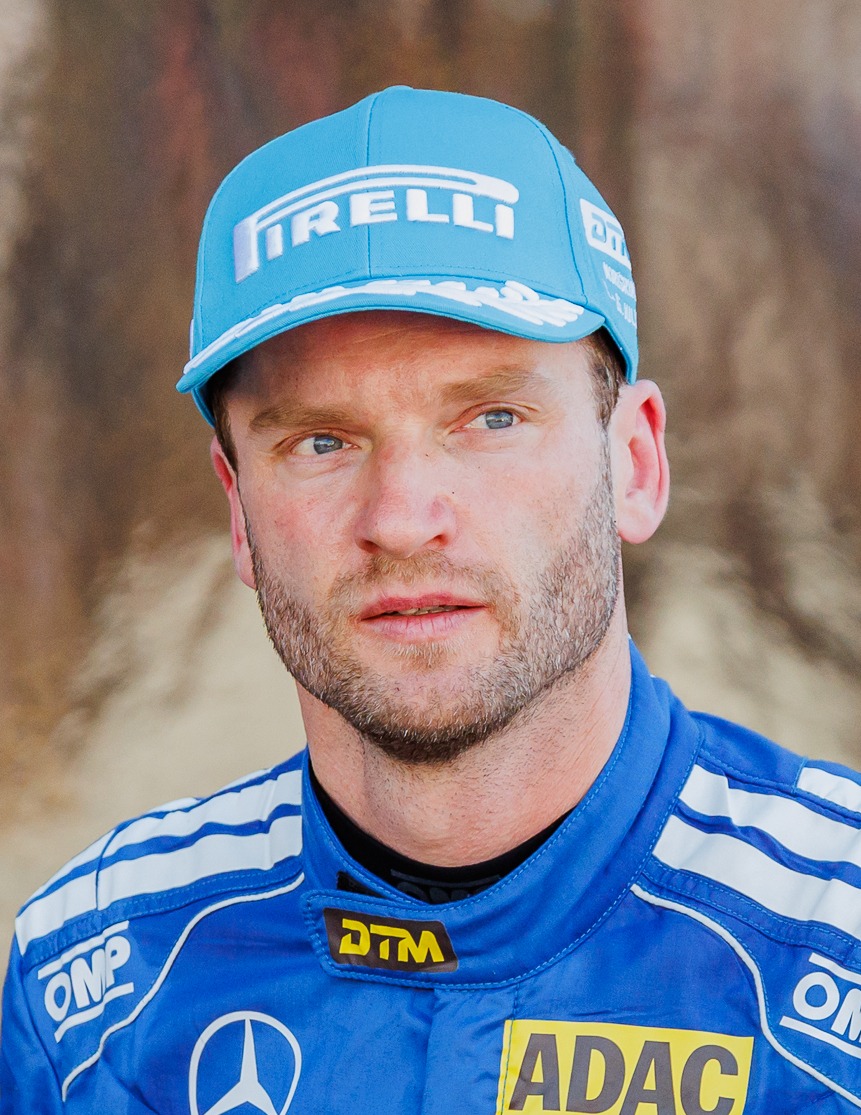
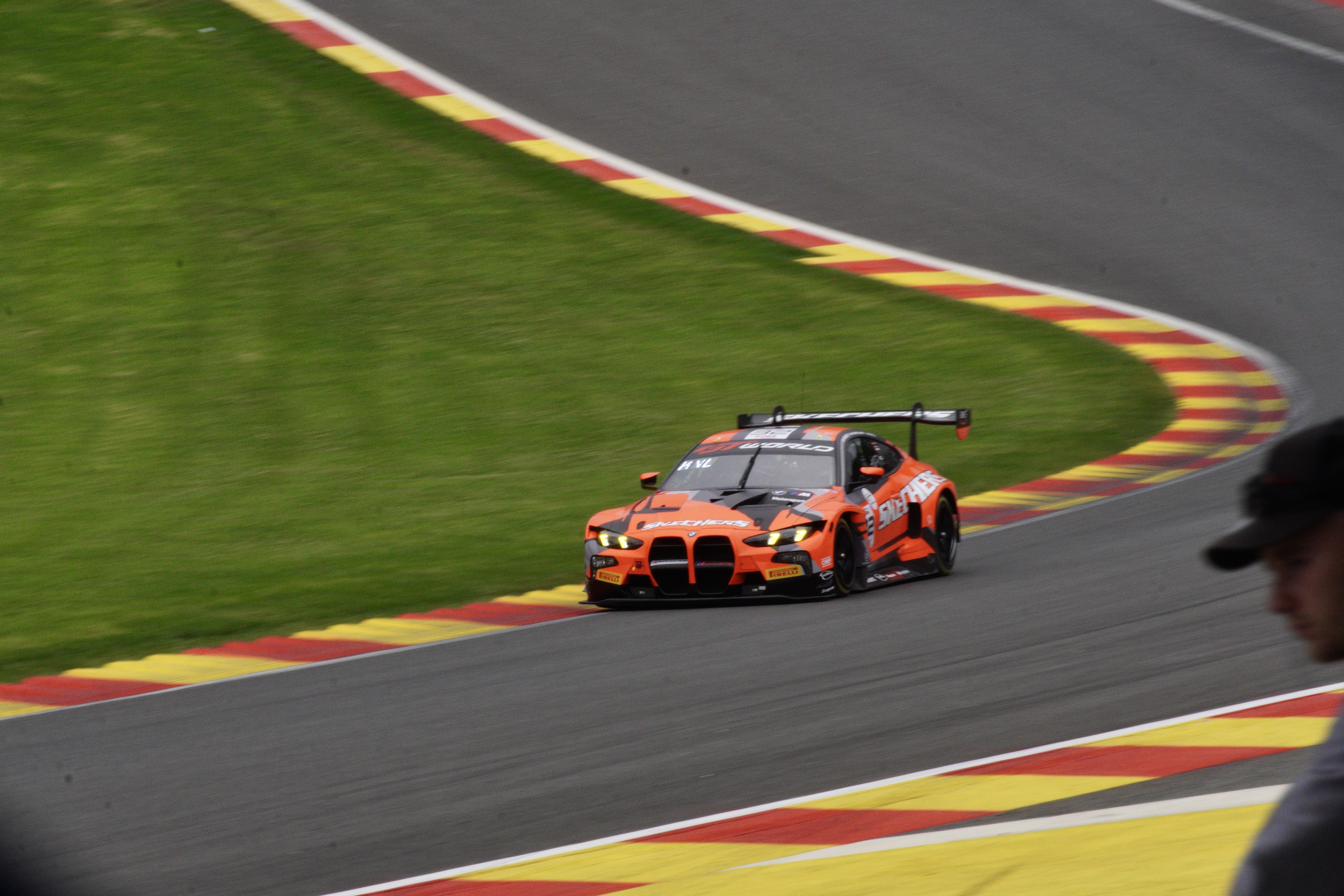
Lucas Auer and Maro Engel won the drivers' championship, while Team WRT won the teams' championship.

The 2026 GT World Challenge Europe Powered by AWS was a motor racing championship for GT3 cars, marking the 13th edition of the GT World Challenge Europe. Organised by the SRO Motorsports Group, it formed the European part of the broader GT World Challenge, which also included GT World Challenge America, GT World Challenge Australia and GT World Challenge Asia.

The championship was split into the Endurance Cup and the Sprint Cup, each with its respective titles, alongside the overall GT World Challenge Europe championship. The season took place over ten rounds at various European circuits. The annual season prologue, which acted as the championship's pre-season testing, took place between 8 and 9 April, with testing for the 24 Hours of Spa occurring between 19 and 20 May. Racing commenced in April and concluded in October.

== Calendar ==
All Sprint Cup rounds consisted of two one-hour races, totalling 15 races throughout the season, alongside the single 3-hour (Monza, Nürburgring and Portimão), 6-hour (Paul Ricard), or 24-hour (Spa) races in Endurance Cup rounds.

Round	Circuit	Date	Series	Map
1	(France) Circuit Paul Ricard	10–12 April	Endurance	2026 GT World Challenge Europe is located in Europe
2	(United Kingdom) Brands Hatch	2–3 May	Sprint	2026 GT World Challenge Europe is located in Europe
3	(Italy) Monza Circuit	28–31 May	Endurance	2026 GT World Challenge Europe is located in Europe
4	(Belgium) Circuit de Spa-Francorchamps	23–28 June	Endurance	2026 GT World Challenge Europe is located in Europe
5	(Italy) Misano World Circuit	16–19 July	Sprint	2026 GT World Challenge Europe is located in Europe
6	(France) Circuit de Nevers Magny-Cours	30 July – 2 August	Sprint	2026 GT World Challenge Europe is located in Europe
7	(Germany) Nürburgring	28–30 August	Endurance	2026 GT World Challenge Europe is located in Europe
8	(Netherlands) Circuit Zandvoort	17–20 September	Sprint	2026 GT World Challenge Europe is located in Europe
9	(Spain) Circuit de Barcelona-Catalunya	1–4 October	Sprint	2026 GT World Challenge Europe is located in Europe
10	(Portugal) Algarve International Circuit	16–17 October	Endurance	2026 GT World Challenge Europe is located in Europe

=== Calendar changes ===
2026 featured a largely unchanged calendar from the previous season. With the only significant alterations being the return of the Algarve International Circuit as the season finale, marking its first appearance since 2015, and Circuit Zandvoort being moved from May to September.

== Entries ==
=== Sprint Cup ===
Bronze Cup entries did not compete at the Brands Hatch round and instead began their Sprint Cup season at Misano World Circuit, the second round of the Sprint Cup and the fifth round of the season.

Team	Car	Engine	No.	Class	Drivers	Rounds
(Belgium) Boutsen VDS	Porsche 911 GT3 R (992.2)	Porsche M97/80 4.2 L Flat-6	2	P	(France) Dorian Boccolacci	All
(Belgium) Boutsen VDS	Porsche 911 GT3 R (992.2)	Porsche M97/80 4.2 L Flat-6	2	P	(Netherlands) Morris Schuring	2, 5, 8
(Belgium) Boutsen VDS	Porsche 911 GT3 R (992.2)	Porsche M97/80 4.2 L Flat-6	2	P	(Belgium) Alessio Picariello	6
(Belgium) Boutsen VDS	Porsche 911 GT3 R (992.2)	Porsche M97/80 4.2 L Flat-6	2	P	(Germany) Sven Müller	9
(Belgium) Boutsen VDS	Porsche 911 GT3 R (992.2)	Porsche M97/80 4.2 L Flat-6	10	G	(Sweden) Robin Knutsson	All
(Belgium) Boutsen VDS	Porsche 911 GT3 R (992.2)	Porsche M97/80 4.2 L Flat-6	10	G	(Belgium) Gilles Magnus	All
(Netherlands) Mercedes-AMG Team Verstappen Racing	Mercedes-AMG GT3 Evo	Mercedes-AMG M159 6.2 L V8	3	P	(Spain) Daniel Juncadella	All
(Netherlands) Mercedes-AMG Team Verstappen Racing	Mercedes-AMG GT3 Evo	Mercedes-AMG M159 6.2 L V8	3	P	(United Kingdom) Chris Lulham	2, 8–9
(Netherlands) Mercedes-AMG Team Verstappen Racing	Mercedes-AMG GT3 Evo	Mercedes-AMG M159 6.2 L V8	3	P	(Andorra) Jules Gounon	5–6
(Bahrain) 2 Seas Motorsport	Mercedes-AMG GT3 Evo	Mercedes-AMG M159 6.2 L V8	222	B	(United Kingdom) Charles Dawson	5–6, 8–9
(Bahrain) 2 Seas Motorsport	Mercedes-AMG GT3 Evo	Mercedes-AMG M159 6.2 L V8	222	B	(United Kingdom) Kiern Jewiss	5–6, 8–9
(United Kingdom) Optimum Motorsport	McLaren 720S GT3 Evo	McLaren M840T 4.0 L Turbo V8	5	S	(Portugal) Guilherme Oliveira	All
(United Kingdom) Optimum Motorsport	McLaren 720S GT3 Evo	McLaren M840T 4.0 L Turbo V8	5	S	(United Kingdom) Mikey Porter	All
(United States) GetSpeed Team BartoneBros	Mercedes-AMG GT3 Evo	Mercedes-AMG M159 6.2 L V8	6	S	(United States) Anthony Bartone	All
(United States) GetSpeed Team BartoneBros	Mercedes-AMG GT3 Evo	Mercedes-AMG M159 6.2 L V8	6	S	(France) Aurélien Panis	All
(United Arab Emirates) GetSpeed Team Dubai	Mercedes-AMG GT3 Evo	Mercedes-AMG M159 6.2 L V8	12	B	(United Arab Emirates) Gabriel Rindone	5–6, 8–9
(United Arab Emirates) GetSpeed Team Dubai	Mercedes-AMG GT3 Evo	Mercedes-AMG M159 6.2 L V8	12	B	(Germany) Fabian Schiller	5–6, 8–9
(Belgium) Comtoyou Racing	Aston Martin Vantage AMR GT3 Evo	Aston Martin M177 4.0 L Turbo V8	7	P	(Belgium) Kobe Pauwels	All
(Belgium) Comtoyou Racing	Aston Martin Vantage AMR GT3 Evo	Aston Martin M177 4.0 L Turbo V8	7	P	(Denmark) Nicki Thiim	All
(Belgium) Comtoyou Racing	Aston Martin Vantage AMR GT3 Evo	Aston Martin M177 4.0 L Turbo V8	11	B	(Italy) Felice Jelmini	5–6, 8–9
(Belgium) Comtoyou Racing	Aston Martin Vantage AMR GT3 Evo	Aston Martin M177 4.0 L Turbo V8	11	B	(Brazil) Marcelo Tomasoni	5–6, 8–9
(Belgium) Comtoyou Racing	Aston Martin Vantage AMR GT3 Evo	Aston Martin M177 4.0 L Turbo V8	21	S	(France) Arthur Dorison	All
(Belgium) Comtoyou Racing	Aston Martin Vantage AMR GT3 Evo	Aston Martin M177 4.0 L Turbo V8	21	S	(Sweden) Oliver Söderström	All
(Lithuania) Pure Rxcing	Porsche 911 GT3 R (992.2)	Porsche M97/80 4.2 L Flat-6	9	S	(United Kingdom) Alex Malykhin	All
(Lithuania) Pure Rxcing	Porsche 911 GT3 R (992.2)	Porsche M97/80 4.2 L Flat-6	9	S	(Italy) Riccardo Pera	5, 8
(Lithuania) Pure Rxcing	Porsche 911 GT3 R (992.2)	Porsche M97/80 4.2 L Flat-6	9	S	(Denmark) Mikkel O. Pedersen	6, 9
(Lithuania) Pure Rxcing	Porsche 911 GT3 R (992.2)	Porsche M97/80 4.2 L Flat-6	9	S	(Slovenia) Alexey Nesov	2
(Switzerland) Emil Frey Racing	Ferrari 296 GT3 Evo	Ferrari F163CE 3.0 L Turbo V6	14	P	(Italy) Matteo Cairoli	All
(Switzerland) Emil Frey Racing	Ferrari 296 GT3 Evo	Ferrari F163CE 3.0 L Turbo V6	14	P	(Finland) Konsta Lappalainen	All
(Switzerland) Emil Frey Racing	Ferrari 296 GT3 Evo	Ferrari F163CE 3.0 L Turbo V6	69	P	(United Kingdom) Ben Green	All
(Switzerland) Emil Frey Racing	Ferrari 296 GT3 Evo	Ferrari F163CE 3.0 L Turbo V6	69	P	(Netherlands) Thierry Vermeulen	All
(France) Saintéloc Racing	Audi R8 LMS Evo II	Audi DAR 5.2 L V10	26	B	(France) Michael Blanchemain	6
(France) Saintéloc Racing	Audi R8 LMS Evo II	Audi DAR 5.2 L V10	26	B	(France) Jim Pla	6
(Switzerland) Kessel Racing	Ferrari 296 GT3 Evo	Ferrari F163CE 3.0 L Turbo V6	27	B	(Italy) David Fumanelli	5–6, 8–9
(Switzerland) Kessel Racing	Ferrari 296 GT3 Evo	Ferrari F163CE 3.0 L Turbo V6	27	B	(Monaco) Marco Pulcini	5–6, 8–9
(Switzerland) Kessel Racing	Ferrari 296 GT3 Evo	Ferrari F163CE 3.0 L Turbo V6	74	B	(United States) Dustin Blattner	5–6, 8–9
(Switzerland) Kessel Racing	Ferrari 296 GT3 Evo	Ferrari F163CE 3.0 L Turbo V6	74	B	(Germany) Dennis Marschall	5–6, 8–9
(Belgium) Team WRT	BMW M4 GT3 Evo	BMW P58 3.0 L Turbo I6	30	S	(Belgium) Matisse Lismont	All
(Belgium) Team WRT	BMW M4 GT3 Evo	BMW P58 3.0 L Turbo I6	30	S	(Argentina) Ignacio Montenegro	All
(Belgium) Team WRT	BMW M4 GT3 Evo	BMW P58 3.0 L Turbo I6	31	P	(Belgium) Amaury Cordeel	All
(Belgium) Team WRT	BMW M4 GT3 Evo	BMW P58 3.0 L Turbo I6	31	P	(South Africa) Jordan Pepper	All
(Belgium) Team WRT	BMW M4 GT3 Evo	BMW P58 3.0 L Turbo I6	32	P	(South Africa) Kelvin van der Linde	All
(Belgium) Team WRT	BMW M4 GT3 Evo	BMW P58 3.0 L Turbo I6	32	P	(Belgium) Charles Weerts	All
(Belgium) Team WRT	BMW M4 GT3 Evo	BMW P58 3.0 L Turbo I6	46	P	(Germany) Max Hesse	All
(Belgium) Team WRT	BMW M4 GT3 Evo	BMW P58 3.0 L Turbo I6	46	P	(Italy) Valentino Rossi	All
(Germany) Walkenhorst Motorsport	Aston Martin Vantage AMR GT3 Evo	Aston Martin M177 4.0 L Turbo V8	34	S	(United Arab Emirates) Jamie Day	All
(Germany) Walkenhorst Motorsport	Aston Martin Vantage AMR GT3 Evo	Aston Martin M177 4.0 L Turbo V8	34	S	(Ecuador) Mateo Villagomez	All
(Germany) Walkenhorst Motorsport	Aston Martin Vantage AMR GT3 Evo	Aston Martin M177 4.0 L Turbo V8	35	S	(France) Maxime Robin	All
(Germany) Walkenhorst Motorsport	Aston Martin Vantage AMR GT3 Evo	Aston Martin M177 4.0 L Turbo V8	35	S	(France) Gaspard Simon	All
(United States) Winward Racing	Mercedes-AMG GT3 Evo	Mercedes-AMG M159 6.2 L V8	48	P	(Austria) Lucas Auer	All
(United States) Winward Racing	Mercedes-AMG GT3 Evo	Mercedes-AMG M159 6.2 L V8	48	P	(Germany) Maro Engel	All
(United States) Winward Racing	Mercedes-AMG GT3 Evo	Mercedes-AMG M159 6.2 L V8	87	B	(Germany) Marvin Dienst	5–6, 8–9
(United States) Winward Racing	Mercedes-AMG GT3 Evo	Mercedes-AMG M159 6.2 L V8	87	B	(Russia) Rinat Salikhov	5–6, 8–9
(Italy) AF Corse	Ferrari 296 GT3 Evo	Ferrari F163CE 3.0 L Turbo V6	50	P	(Monaco) Arthur Leclerc	All
(Italy) AF Corse	Ferrari 296 GT3 Evo	Ferrari F163CE 3.0 L Turbo V6	50	P	(France) Thomas Neubauer	All
(Italy) AF Corse	Ferrari 296 GT3 Evo	Ferrari F163CE 3.0 L Turbo V6	51	G	(Italy) Tommaso Mosca	All
(Italy) AF Corse	Ferrari 296 GT3 Evo	Ferrari F163CE 3.0 L Turbo V6	51	G	(Peru) Matías Zagazeta	All
(Italy) AF Corse	Ferrari 296 GT3 Evo	Ferrari F163CE 3.0 L Turbo V6	52	S	(Belgium) Jef Machiels	All
(Italy) AF Corse	Ferrari 296 GT3 Evo	Ferrari F163CE 3.0 L Turbo V6	52	S	(Belgium) Gilles Stadsbader	All
(Italy) AF Corse	Ferrari 296 GT3 Evo	Ferrari F163CE 3.0 L Turbo V6	71	S	(Thailand) Carl Bennett	All
(Italy) AF Corse	Ferrari 296 GT3 Evo	Ferrari F163CE 3.0 L Turbo V6	71	S	(Switzerland) Felix Hirsiger	All
(Italy) Dinamic GT	Porsche 911 GT3 R (992.2)	Porsche M97/80 4.2 L Flat-6	54	S	(Thailand) Tanart Sathienthirakul	All
(Italy) Dinamic GT	Porsche 911 GT3 R (992.2)	Porsche M97/80 4.2 L Flat-6	54	S	(Slovenia) Mark Kastelic	5–6, 8–9
(Italy) Dinamic GT	Porsche 911 GT3 R (992.2)	Porsche M97/80 4.2 L Flat-6	54	S	(France) Loris Cabirou	2
(Italy) Dinamic GT	Porsche 911 GT3 R (992.2)	Porsche M97/80 4.2 L Flat-6	55	B	(France) Loris Cabirou	5–6, 8–9
(Italy) Dinamic GT	Porsche 911 GT3 R (992.2)	Porsche M97/80 4.2 L Flat-6	55	B	(Russia) Dmitry Gvazava	5–6, 8–9
(United Kingdom) Garage 59	McLaren 720S GT3 Evo	McLaren M840T 4.0 L Turbo V8	58	G	(United Kingdom) Tom Fleming	All
(United Kingdom) Garage 59	McLaren 720S GT3 Evo	McLaren M840T 4.0 L Turbo V8	58	G	(Monaco) Louis Prette	All
(United Kingdom) Garage 59	McLaren 720S GT3 Evo	McLaren M840T 4.0 L Turbo V8	59	P	(United Kingdom) Dean MacDonald	All
(United Kingdom) Garage 59	McLaren 720S GT3 Evo	McLaren M840T 4.0 L Turbo V8	59	P	(Germany) Marvin Kirchhöfer	2, 5–6, 8
(United Kingdom) Garage 59	McLaren 720S GT3 Evo	McLaren M840T 4.0 L Turbo V8	59	P	(United Kingdom) Joseph Loake	9
(Germany) Tresor Attempto Racing	Audi R8 LMS Evo II	Audi DAR 5.2 L V10	66	S	(Italy) Andrea Frassineti	All
(Germany) Tresor Attempto Racing	Audi R8 LMS Evo II	Audi DAR 5.2 L V10	66	S	(Israel) Ariel Levi	All
(Germany) Tresor Attempto Racing	Audi R8 LMS Evo II	Audi DAR 5.2 L V10	88	B	(Denmark) Sebastian Øgaard	5–6, 8–9
(Germany) Tresor Attempto Racing	Audi R8 LMS Evo II	Audi DAR 5.2 L V10	88	B	(Germany) Carrie Schreiner	5–6, 8–9
(Germany) Tresor Attempto Racing	Audi R8 LMS Evo II	Audi DAR 5.2 L V10	99	G	(Germany) Alex Aka	All
(Germany) Tresor Attempto Racing	Audi R8 LMS Evo II	Audi DAR 5.2 L V10	99	G	(Luxembourg) Dylan Pereira	All
(Netherlands) KPX Motorsport (Note: Peter Kox and Stéphane Kox were initially announced to drive the No. 77 KPX Motorsport BMW in the Silver Cup, but were replaced by David Pittard and Jop Rappange, who completed the full Sprint Cup season.)	BMW M4 GT3 Evo	BMW P58 3.0 L Turbo I6	77	G	(United Kingdom) David Pittard	All
(Netherlands) KPX Motorsport	BMW M4 GT3 Evo	BMW P58 3.0 L Turbo I6	77	G	(Netherlands) Jop Rappange	All
(Germany) Lionspeed GP	Porsche 911 GT3 R (992.2)	Porsche M97/80 4.2 L Flat-6	80	P	(Denmark) Bastian Buus	All
(Germany) Lionspeed GP	Porsche 911 GT3 R (992.2)	Porsche M97/80 4.2 L Flat-6	80	P	(Switzerland) Ricardo Feller	All
(Germany) Lionspeed GP	Porsche 911 GT3 R (992.2)	Porsche M97/80 4.2 L Flat-6	89 (Note: The No. 89 Lionspeed GP Porsche was set to be a Bronze Cup car driven by Alex Fontana and Bashar Mardini. Instead, the car made just two appearances in the final two rounds of the Sprint Cup in Silver, with Nicolas Baert, Flynt Schuring and Gustav Bergström.)	S	(Belgium) Nicolas Baert	8–9
(Germany) Lionspeed GP	Porsche 911 GT3 R (992.2)	Porsche M97/80 4.2 L Flat-6	89	S	(Netherlands) Flynt Schuring	8
(Germany) Lionspeed GP	Porsche 911 GT3 R (992.2)	Porsche M97/80 4.2 L Flat-6	89	S	(Sweden) Gustav Bergström	9
(Austria) Eastalent Racing	Audi R8 LMS Evo II	Audi DAR 5.2 L V10	84	P	(Germany) Christopher Haase	All
(Austria) Eastalent Racing	Audi R8 LMS Evo II	Audi DAR 5.2 L V10	84	P	(Austria) Simon Reicher	All
(United Kingdom) Ziggo Sport Tempesta Racing	Porsche 911 GT3 R (992.2)	Porsche M97/80 4.2 L Flat-6	93	B	(Italy) Eddie Cheever III	5–6, 8–9
(United Kingdom) Ziggo Sport Tempesta Racing	Porsche 911 GT3 R (992.2)	Porsche M97/80 4.2 L Flat-6	93	B	(Republic of Ireland) Peter Dempsey	5–6, 8–9
(Germany) Rutronik Racing	Lamborghini Temerario GT3	Lamborghini L411 4.0 L Turbo V8	96	P	(Germany) Luca Engstler	All
(Germany) Rutronik Racing	Lamborghini Temerario GT3	Lamborghini L411 4.0 L Turbo V8	96	P	(Switzerland) Patric Niederhauser	All
(France) CSA Racing	McLaren 720S GT3 Evo	McLaren M840T 4.0 L Turbo V8	111	G	(United Kingdom) James Kell	All
(France) CSA Racing	McLaren 720S GT3 Evo	McLaren M840T 4.0 L Turbo V8	111	G	(France) Arthur Rougier	All
(France) CSA Racing	McLaren 720S GT3 Evo	McLaren M840T 4.0 L Turbo V8	555	G	(France) Romain Andriolo	All
(France) CSA Racing	McLaren 720S GT3 Evo	McLaren M840T 4.0 L Turbo V8	555	G	(France) Simon Gachet	All
(Italy) VSR	Lamborghini Temerario GT3	Lamborghini L411 4.0 L Turbo V8	163	G	(Italy) Mattia Michelotto	All
(Italy) VSR	Lamborghini Temerario GT3	Lamborghini L411 4.0 L Turbo V8	163	G	(Italy) Loris Spinelli	All
(Austria) Razoon – more than racing (Note: Razoon – more than racing had initially announced Denny Berndt and Leo Pichler as the drivers of the No. 914 Porsche, but neither made an appearance. The car would ultimately make two appearances of the Sprint Cup with different drivers.)	Porsche 911 GT3 R (992.2)	Porsche M97/80 4.2 L Flat-6	914	S	(Denmark) Simon Birch	2
(Austria) Razoon – more than racing	Porsche 911 GT3 R (992.2)	Porsche M97/80 4.2 L Flat-6	914	S	(Norway) Magnus Gustavsen	2
(Austria) Razoon – more than racing	Porsche 911 GT3 R (992.2)	Porsche M97/80 4.2 L Flat-6	914	P	(Denmark) Simon Birch	8
(Austria) Razoon – more than racing	Porsche 911 GT3 R (992.2)	Porsche M97/80 4.2 L Flat-6	914	P	(Austria) Klaus Bachler	8
(United Kingdom) Paradine Competition	BMW M4 GT3 Evo	BMW P58 3.0 L Turbo I6	991	B	(Brazil) Augusto Farfus	5–6, 8–9
(United Kingdom) Paradine Competition	BMW M4 GT3 Evo	BMW P58 3.0 L Turbo I6	991	B	(United Kingdom) Darren Leung	5–6, 8–9

Icon	Class
P	Pro (Overall)
G	Gold Cup
S	Silver Cup
B	Bronze Cup

=== Endurance Cup ===
Team	Car	Engine	No.	Class	Drivers	Rounds
(Malaysia) Johor Motorsports Racing JMR	Chevrolet Corvette Z06 GT3.R	Chevrolet LT6.R 5.5 L V8	0	PA	(United Kingdom) Ben Green	4
(Malaysia) Johor Motorsports Racing JMR	Chevrolet Corvette Z06 GT3.R	Chevrolet LT6.R 5.5 L V8	0	PA	(Malaysia) Prince Abu Bakar Ibrahim	4
(Malaysia) Johor Motorsports Racing JMR	Chevrolet Corvette Z06 GT3.R	Chevrolet LT6.R 5.5 L V8	0	PA	(Malaysia) H.H. Prince Jefri Ibrahim	4
(Malaysia) Johor Motorsports Racing JMR	Chevrolet Corvette Z06 GT3.R	Chevrolet LT6.R 5.5 L V8	0	PA	(Australia) Jordan Love	4
(Belgium) Boutsen VDS	Porsche 911 GT3 R (992.2)	Porsche M97/80 4.2 L Flat-6	2	P	(France) Dorian Boccolacci	All
(Belgium) Boutsen VDS	Porsche 911 GT3 R (992.2)	Porsche M97/80 4.2 L Flat-6	2	P	(Belgium) Alessio Picariello	All
(Belgium) Boutsen VDS	Porsche 911 GT3 R (992.2)	Porsche M97/80 4.2 L Flat-6	2	P	(Netherlands) Morris Schuring	All
(Belgium) Boutsen VDS	Porsche 911 GT3 R (992.2)	Porsche M97/80 4.2 L Flat-6	10	G	(Sweden) Robin Knutsson	All
(Belgium) Boutsen VDS	Porsche 911 GT3 R (992.2)	Porsche M97/80 4.2 L Flat-6	10	G	(Belgium) Gilles Magnus	All
(Belgium) Boutsen VDS	Porsche 911 GT3 R (992.2)	Porsche M97/80 4.2 L Flat-6	10	G	(France) Alessandro Ghiretti	1, 3–4, 10
(Belgium) Boutsen VDS	Porsche 911 GT3 R (992.2)	Porsche M97/80 4.2 L Flat-6	10	G	(Germany) Nico Menzel	7
(Netherlands) Mercedes-AMG Team Verstappen Racing	Mercedes-AMG GT3 Evo	Mercedes-AMG M159 6.2 L V8	3	P	(United Kingdom) Chris Lulham	All
(Netherlands) Mercedes-AMG Team Verstappen Racing	Mercedes-AMG GT3 Evo	Mercedes-AMG M159 6.2 L V8	3	P	(Andorra) Jules Gounon	1, 3–4, 7
(Netherlands) Mercedes-AMG Team Verstappen Racing	Mercedes-AMG GT3 Evo	Mercedes-AMG M159 6.2 L V8	3	P	(Spain) Daniel Juncadella	1, 3–4, 7
(Netherlands) Mercedes-AMG Team Verstappen Racing	Mercedes-AMG GT3 Evo	Mercedes-AMG M159 6.2 L V8	3	P	(United Kingdom) Ben Barnicoat	10
(Netherlands) Mercedes-AMG Team Verstappen Racing	Mercedes-AMG GT3 Evo	Mercedes-AMG M159 6.2 L V8	3	P	(Netherlands) Max Verstappen	10
(Bahrain) 2 Seas Motorsport	Mercedes-AMG GT3 Evo	Mercedes-AMG M159 6.2 L V8	33	B	(United States) Jason Hart	4
(Bahrain) 2 Seas Motorsport	Mercedes-AMG GT3 Evo	Mercedes-AMG M159 6.2 L V8	33	B	(United States) Scott Noble	4
(Bahrain) 2 Seas Motorsport	Mercedes-AMG GT3 Evo	Mercedes-AMG M159 6.2 L V8	33	B	(United Kingdom) Aaron Walker	4
(Bahrain) 2 Seas Motorsport	Mercedes-AMG GT3 Evo	Mercedes-AMG M159 6.2 L V8	33	B	(United Kingdom) Lewis Williamson	4
(Bahrain) 2 Seas Motorsport	Mercedes-AMG GT3 Evo	Mercedes-AMG M159 6.2 L V8	222	B	(Republic of Ireland) Reece Barr	All
(Bahrain) 2 Seas Motorsport	Mercedes-AMG GT3 Evo	Mercedes-AMG M159 6.2 L V8	222	B	(United Kingdom) Charles Dawson	All
(Bahrain) 2 Seas Motorsport	Mercedes-AMG GT3 Evo	Mercedes-AMG M159 6.2 L V8	222	B	(United Kingdom) Kiern Jewiss	All
(Bahrain) 2 Seas Motorsport	Mercedes-AMG GT3 Evo	Mercedes-AMG M159 6.2 L V8	222	B	(Australia) Garnet Patterson	4
(United Kingdom) Optimum Motorsport	McLaren 720S GT3 Evo	McLaren M840T 4.0 L Turbo V8	4	G	(United Kingdom) Harry George	All
(United Kingdom) Optimum Motorsport	McLaren 720S GT3 Evo	McLaren M840T 4.0 L Turbo V8	4	G	(United Kingdom) Adam Smalley	All
(United Kingdom) Optimum Motorsport	McLaren 720S GT3 Evo	McLaren M840T 4.0 L Turbo V8	4	G	(United Kingdom) Freddie Tomlinson	All
(United Kingdom) Optimum Motorsport	McLaren 720S GT3 Evo	McLaren M840T 4.0 L Turbo V8	4	G	(Netherlands) Ruben Del Sarte	4
(United Kingdom) Optimum Motorsport	McLaren 720S GT3 Evo	McLaren M840T 4.0 L Turbo V8	5	S	(Portugal) Guilherme Oliveira	All
(United Kingdom) Optimum Motorsport	McLaren 720S GT3 Evo	McLaren M840T 4.0 L Turbo V8	5	S	(United Kingdom) Mikey Porter	All
(United Kingdom) Optimum Motorsport	McLaren 720S GT3 Evo	McLaren M840T 4.0 L Turbo V8	5	S	(Netherlands) Dante Rappange	All
(United Kingdom) Optimum Motorsport	McLaren 720S GT3 Evo	McLaren M840T 4.0 L Turbo V8	5	S	(Germany) Salman Owega	4
(United States) GetSpeed Team BartoneBros	Mercedes-AMG GT3 Evo	Mercedes-AMG M159 6.2 L V8	6	S	(United States) Anthony Bartone	All
(United States) GetSpeed Team BartoneBros	Mercedes-AMG GT3 Evo	Mercedes-AMG M159 6.2 L V8	6	S	(France) César Gazeau	All
(United States) GetSpeed Team BartoneBros	Mercedes-AMG GT3 Evo	Mercedes-AMG M159 6.2 L V8	6	S	(France) Aurélien Panis	All
(United States) GetSpeed Team BartoneBros	Mercedes-AMG GT3 Evo	Mercedes-AMG M159 6.2 L V8	6	S	(Poland) Karol Basz	4
(United Arab Emirates) GetSpeed Team Dubai (Note: Will Martin was initially announced to drive the No. 12 GetSpeed Team Dubai Mercedes-AMG but made no appearances over the course of the season.)	Mercedes-AMG GT3 Evo	Mercedes-AMG M159 6.2 L V8	12	B	(Germany) Tom Kalender	All
(United Arab Emirates) GetSpeed Team Dubai	Mercedes-AMG GT3 Evo	Mercedes-AMG M159 6.2 L V8	12	B	(United Arab Emirates) Gabriel Rindone	All
(United Arab Emirates) GetSpeed Team Dubai	Mercedes-AMG GT3 Evo	Mercedes-AMG M159 6.2 L V8	12	B	(Canada) Mikaël Grenier	1, 3–4, 10
(United Arab Emirates) GetSpeed Team Dubai	Mercedes-AMG GT3 Evo	Mercedes-AMG M159 6.2 L V8	12	B	(South Africa) Jarrod Waberski	4
(United Arab Emirates) GetSpeed Team Dubai	Mercedes-AMG GT3 Evo	Mercedes-AMG M159 6.2 L V8	12	B	(Australia) Jayden Ojeda	7
(Germany) Mercedes-AMG Team GetSpeed	Mercedes-AMG GT3 Evo	Mercedes-AMG M159 6.2 L V8	17	P	(Germany) Maximilian Götz	All
(Germany) Mercedes-AMG Team GetSpeed	Mercedes-AMG GT3 Evo	Mercedes-AMG M159 6.2 L V8	17	P	(Germany) Fabian Schiller	All
(Germany) Mercedes-AMG Team GetSpeed	Mercedes-AMG GT3 Evo	Mercedes-AMG M159 6.2 L V8	17	P	(Belgium) Maxime Martin	1, 3–4, 7
(Germany) Mercedes-AMG Team GetSpeed	Mercedes-AMG GT3 Evo	Mercedes-AMG M159 6.2 L V8	17	P	(Estonia) Ralf Aron	10
(United States) GetSpeed Team Noble Racing	Mercedes-AMG GT3 Evo	Mercedes-AMG M159 6.2 L V8	67	B	(United Kingdom) Philip Ellis	1
(United States) GetSpeed Team Noble Racing	Mercedes-AMG GT3 Evo	Mercedes-AMG M159 6.2 L V8	67	B	(United States) Jason Hart	1
(United States) GetSpeed Team Noble Racing	Mercedes-AMG GT3 Evo	Mercedes-AMG M159 6.2 L V8	67	B	(United States) Scott Noble	1
(Germany) GetSpeed Team PCX	Mercedes-AMG GT3 Evo	Mercedes-AMG M159 6.2 L V8	999	PA	(France) Jordan Boisson	4
(Germany) GetSpeed Team PCX	Mercedes-AMG GT3 Evo	Mercedes-AMG M159 6.2 L V8	999	PA	(France) Patrick Charlaix	4
(Germany) GetSpeed Team PCX	Mercedes-AMG GT3 Evo	Mercedes-AMG M159 6.2 L V8	999	PA	(France) Marvin Klein	4
(Germany) GetSpeed Team PCX	Mercedes-AMG GT3 Evo	Mercedes-AMG M159 6.2 L V8	999	PA	(Belgium) Benjamin Paque	4
(Germany) GetSpeed Team PCX	Mercedes-AMG GT3 Evo	Mercedes-AMG M159 6.2 L V8	999	B	(France) Jordan Boisson	10
(Germany) GetSpeed Team PCX	Mercedes-AMG GT3 Evo	Mercedes-AMG M159 6.2 L V8	999	B	(France) Patrick Charlaix	10
(Germany) GetSpeed Team PCX	Mercedes-AMG GT3 Evo	Mercedes-AMG M159 6.2 L V8	999	B	(France) Marvin Klein	10
(Belgium) Comtoyou Racing	Aston Martin Vantage AMR GT3 Evo	Aston Martin M177 4.0 L Turbo V8	7	P	(San Marino) Mattia Drudi	All
(Belgium) Comtoyou Racing	Aston Martin Vantage AMR GT3 Evo	Aston Martin M177 4.0 L Turbo V8	7	P	(Denmark) Nicki Thiim	All
(Belgium) Comtoyou Racing	Aston Martin Vantage AMR GT3 Evo	Aston Martin M177 4.0 L Turbo V8	7	P	(Denmark) Marco Sørensen	1, 3–4, 7
(Belgium) Comtoyou Racing	Aston Martin Vantage AMR GT3 Evo	Aston Martin M177 4.0 L Turbo V8	7	P	(United Kingdom) Ross Gunn	10
(Belgium) Comtoyou Racing	Aston Martin Vantage AMR GT3 Evo	Aston Martin M177 4.0 L Turbo V8	11	B	(United States) Aaron Muss	All
(Belgium) Comtoyou Racing	Aston Martin Vantage AMR GT3 Evo	Aston Martin M177 4.0 L Turbo V8	11	B	(Brazil) Marcelo Tomasoni	All
(Belgium) Comtoyou Racing	Aston Martin Vantage AMR GT3 Evo	Aston Martin M177 4.0 L Turbo V8	11	B	(Canada) Kyle Marcelli	1, 3–4
(Belgium) Comtoyou Racing	Aston Martin Vantage AMR GT3 Evo	Aston Martin M177 4.0 L Turbo V8	11	B	(Italy) Felice Jelmini	4
(Belgium) Comtoyou Racing	Aston Martin Vantage AMR GT3 Evo	Aston Martin M177 4.0 L Turbo V8	11	B	(Brazil) Sérgio Sette Câmara	7
(Belgium) Comtoyou Racing	Aston Martin Vantage AMR GT3 Evo	Aston Martin M177 4.0 L Turbo V8	11	B	(France) Valentin Hasse-Clot	10
(Belgium) Comtoyou Racing	Aston Martin Vantage AMR GT3 Evo	Aston Martin M177 4.0 L Turbo V8	18	P	(Spain) Mari Boya	1
(Belgium) Comtoyou Racing	Aston Martin Vantage AMR GT3 Evo	Aston Martin M177 4.0 L Turbo V8	18	P	(Spain) Roberto Merhi	1
(Belgium) Comtoyou Racing	Aston Martin Vantage AMR GT3 Evo	Aston Martin M177 4.0 L Turbo V8	18	P	(Canada) Lance Stroll	1
(Belgium) Comtoyou Racing	Aston Martin Vantage AMR GT3 Evo	Aston Martin M177 4.0 L Turbo V8	21	S	(France) Sébastien Baud	All
(Belgium) Comtoyou Racing	Aston Martin Vantage AMR GT3 Evo	Aston Martin M177 4.0 L Turbo V8	21	S	(Belgium) Kobe Pauwels	All
(Belgium) Comtoyou Racing	Aston Martin Vantage AMR GT3 Evo	Aston Martin M177 4.0 L Turbo V8	21	S	(Sweden) Oliver Söderström	All
(Belgium) Comtoyou Racing	Aston Martin Vantage AMR GT3 Evo	Aston Martin M177 4.0 L Turbo V8	21	S	(France) Arthur Dorison	4
(Belgium) Comtoyou Racing	Aston Martin Vantage AMR GT3 Evo	Aston Martin M177 4.0 L Turbo V8	700	PA	(Belgium) Nicolas Baert	4
(Belgium) Comtoyou Racing	Aston Martin Vantage AMR GT3 Evo	Aston Martin M177 4.0 L Turbo V8	700	PA	(Belgium) Sarah Bovy	4
(Belgium) Comtoyou Racing	Aston Martin Vantage AMR GT3 Evo	Aston Martin M177 4.0 L Turbo V8	700	PA	(Belgium) Xavier Knauf	4
(Belgium) Comtoyou Racing	Aston Martin Vantage AMR GT3 Evo	Aston Martin M177 4.0 L Turbo V8	700	PA	(Belgium) Grégory Servais	4
(Germany) Car Collection Motorsport	Porsche 911 GT3 R (992.2)	Porsche M97/80 4.2 L Flat-6	8	PA	(Canada) Reinhold Krahn	4
(Germany) Car Collection Motorsport	Porsche 911 GT3 R (992.2)	Porsche M97/80 4.2 L Flat-6	8	PA	(Switzerland) Nicolò Rosi	4
(Germany) Car Collection Motorsport	Porsche 911 GT3 R (992.2)	Porsche M97/80 4.2 L Flat-6	8	PA	(Italy) Niccolò Schirò	4
(Germany) Car Collection Motorsport	Porsche 911 GT3 R (992.2)	Porsche M97/80 4.2 L Flat-6	8	PA	(Germany) Joel Sturm	4
(Germany) Car Collection Motorsport	Porsche 911 GT3 R (992.2)	Porsche M97/80 4.2 L Flat-6	8	B	(Italy) Pietro Armanni	10
(Germany) Car Collection Motorsport	Porsche 911 GT3 R (992.2)	Porsche M97/80 4.2 L Flat-6	8	B	(Canada) Reinhold Krahn	10
(Germany) Car Collection Motorsport	Porsche 911 GT3 R (992.2)	Porsche M97/80 4.2 L Flat-6	8	B	(Germany) Joel Sturm	10
(Lithuania) Pure Rxcing	Porsche 911 GT3 R (992.2)	Porsche M97/80 4.2 L Flat-6	9	S	(Austria) Max Hofer	All
(Lithuania) Pure Rxcing	Porsche 911 GT3 R (992.2)	Porsche M97/80 4.2 L Flat-6	9	S	(United Kingdom) Alex Malykhin	All
(Lithuania) Pure Rxcing	Porsche 911 GT3 R (992.2)	Porsche M97/80 4.2 L Flat-6	9	S	(Slovenia) Alexey Nesov	1, 3–4
(Lithuania) Pure Rxcing	Porsche 911 GT3 R (992.2)	Porsche M97/80 4.2 L Flat-6	9	S	(Denmark) Mikkel O. Pedersen	7, 10
(Lithuania) Pure Rxcing	Porsche 911 GT3 R (992.2)	Porsche M97/80 4.2 L Flat-6	9	S	(Italy) Enzo Trulli	4
(Germany) Team Motopark	Mercedes-AMG GT3 Evo	Mercedes-AMG M159 6.2 L V8	19	S	(Australia) Christian Mansell	10
(Germany) Team Motopark	Mercedes-AMG GT3 Evo	Mercedes-AMG M159 6.2 L V8	19	S	(Argentina) Marcos Siebert	10
(Germany) Team Motopark	Mercedes-AMG GT3 Evo	Mercedes-AMG M159 6.2 L V8	19	S	(United Kingdom) Aaron Walker	10
(Germany) Team Motopark	Mercedes-AMG GT3 Evo	Mercedes-AMG M159 6.2 L V8	20	S	(Angola) Rui Andrade	4
(Germany) Team Motopark	Mercedes-AMG GT3 Evo	Mercedes-AMG M159 6.2 L V8	20	S	(Australia) Christian Mansell	4
(Germany) Team Motopark	Mercedes-AMG GT3 Evo	Mercedes-AMG M159 6.2 L V8	20	S	(Switzerland) Yannik Mettler	4
(Germany) Team Motopark	Mercedes-AMG GT3 Evo	Mercedes-AMG M159 6.2 L V8	20	S	(Hungary) Levente Révész	4
(Germany) Team Motopark	Mercedes-AMG GT3 Evo	Mercedes-AMG M159 6.2 L V8	20	P	(Austria) Dominik Baumann	10
(Germany) Team Motopark	Mercedes-AMG GT3 Evo	Mercedes-AMG M159 6.2 L V8	20	P	(United Kingdom) Philip Ellis	10
(Germany) Team Motopark	Mercedes-AMG GT3 Evo	Mercedes-AMG M159 6.2 L V8	20	P	(Russia) Nikita Mazepin	10
(France) Schumacher CLRT	Porsche 911 GT3 R (992.2)	Porsche M97/80 4.2 L Flat-6	22	P	(Australia) Matt Campbell	4
(France) Schumacher CLRT	Porsche 911 GT3 R (992.2)	Porsche M97/80 4.2 L Flat-6	22	P	(Turkey) Ayhancan Güven	4
(France) Schumacher CLRT	Porsche 911 GT3 R (992.2)	Porsche M97/80 4.2 L Flat-6	22	P	(France) Frédéric Makowiecki	4
(United Kingdom) Team RJN	McLaren 720S GT3 Evo	McLaren M840T 4.0 L Turbo V8	23	S	(Germany) Ben Dörr	All
(United Kingdom) Team RJN	McLaren 720S GT3 Evo	McLaren M840T 4.0 L Turbo V8	23	S	(United Kingdom) Horatio Fitz-Simon	All
(United Kingdom) Team RJN	McLaren 720S GT3 Evo	McLaren M840T 4.0 L Turbo V8	23	S	(United Kingdom) Max Lynn	All
(United Kingdom) Team RJN	McLaren 720S GT3 Evo	McLaren M840T 4.0 L Turbo V8	23	S	(United States) Wyatt Brichacek	4
(United Kingdom) Steller Motorsport	Chevrolet Corvette Z06 GT3.R	Chevrolet LT6.R 5.5 L V8	24	G	(Denmark) Dennis Lind	All
(United Kingdom) Steller Motorsport	Chevrolet Corvette Z06 GT3.R	Chevrolet LT6.R 5.5 L V8	24	G	(France) Antoine Doquin	1, 3–4, 7
(United Kingdom) Steller Motorsport	Chevrolet Corvette Z06 GT3.R	Chevrolet LT6.R 5.5 L V8	24	G	(Denmark) Mikkel Mac	3, 7, 10
(United Kingdom) Steller Motorsport	Chevrolet Corvette Z06 GT3.R	Chevrolet LT6.R 5.5 L V8	24	G	(Spain) Lorenzo Fluxá Cross	1
(United Kingdom) Steller Motorsport	Chevrolet Corvette Z06 GT3.R	Chevrolet LT6.R 5.5 L V8	24	G	(Denmark) Mikkel Gaarde Pedersen	4
(United Kingdom) Steller Motorsport	Chevrolet Corvette Z06 GT3.R	Chevrolet LT6.R 5.5 L V8	24	G	(Germany) Lenny Ried	4
(United Kingdom) Steller Motorsport	Chevrolet Corvette Z06 GT3.R	Chevrolet LT6.R 5.5 L V8	24	G	(Denmark) Kasper H. Jensen	10
(France) Saintéloc Racing (Note: Saintéloc Racing had announced that Didier André and Grégory Guilvert would be two of the drivers for the French outfit’s sole Audi entry. Instead, the two would not make any appearances while the car ran with other drivers.)	Audi R8 LMS Evo II	Audi DAR 5.2 L V10	25	S	(France) Etienne Cheli	All
(France) Saintéloc Racing	Audi R8 LMS Evo II	Audi DAR 5.2 L V10	25	S	(Argentina) Ezequiel Pérez Companc	All
(France) Saintéloc Racing	Audi R8 LMS Evo II	Audi DAR 5.2 L V10	25	S	(Ukraine) Ivan Klymenko	1, 3–4, 10
(France) Saintéloc Racing	Audi R8 LMS Evo II	Audi DAR 5.2 L V10	25	S	(Switzerland) Lucas Legeret	4
(France) Saintéloc Racing	Audi R8 LMS Evo II	Audi DAR 5.2 L V10	25	S	(Belgium) Lorens Lecertua	7
(Antigua and Barbuda) Haas RT	Audi R8 LMS Evo II	Audi DAR 5.2 L V10	28	PA	(Belgium) Simon Balcaen	4
(Antigua and Barbuda) Haas RT	Audi R8 LMS Evo II	Audi DAR 5.2 L V10	28	PA	(Belgium) Mathieu Castelein	4
(Antigua and Barbuda) Haas RT	Audi R8 LMS Evo II	Audi DAR 5.2 L V10	28	PA	(Belgium) Pierre Castelein	4
(Antigua and Barbuda) Haas RT	Audi R8 LMS Evo II	Audi DAR 5.2 L V10	28	PA	(France) Steven Palette	4
(Belgium) Team WRT	BMW M4 GT3 Evo	BMW P58 3.0 L Turbo I6	30	S	(Belgium) Amaury Cordeel	All
(Belgium) Team WRT	BMW M4 GT3 Evo	BMW P58 3.0 L Turbo I6	30	S	(Belgium) Matisse Lismont	All
(Belgium) Team WRT	BMW M4 GT3 Evo	BMW P58 3.0 L Turbo I6	30	S	(Argentina) Ignacio Montenegro	All
(Belgium) Team WRT	BMW M4 GT3 Evo	BMW P58 3.0 L Turbo I6	30	S	(United Arab Emirates) Mathieu Detry	4
(Belgium) Team WRT	BMW M4 GT3 Evo	BMW P58 3.0 L Turbo I6	32	P	(South Africa) Kelvin van der Linde	All
(Belgium) Team WRT	BMW M4 GT3 Evo	BMW P58 3.0 L Turbo I6	32	P	(South Africa) Jordan Pepper	All
(Belgium) Team WRT	BMW M4 GT3 Evo	BMW P58 3.0 L Turbo I6	32	P	(Belgium) Charles Weerts	All
(Belgium) Team WRT	BMW M4 GT3 Evo	BMW P58 3.0 L Turbo I6	46	P	(Germany) Max Hesse	All
(Belgium) Team WRT	BMW M4 GT3 Evo	BMW P58 3.0 L Turbo I6	46	P	(Italy) Valentino Rossi	All
(Belgium) Team WRT	BMW M4 GT3 Evo	BMW P58 3.0 L Turbo I6	46	P	(United Kingdom) Dan Harper	1, 3–4, 7
(Belgium) Team WRT	BMW M4 GT3 Evo	BMW P58 3.0 L Turbo I6	46	P	(United States) Neil Verhagen	10
(Germany) natural elements by Walkenhorst Motorsport	Aston Martin Vantage AMR GT3 Evo	Aston Martin M177 4.0 L Turbo V8	34	P	(Portugal) Henrique Chaves (Note: The No. 34 Walkenhorst Motorsport Aston Martin was initially entered for the first round at Paul Ricard but was forced to withdraw after the car crashed with heavy damage during the pre-season prologue.)	All
(Germany) natural elements by Walkenhorst Motorsport	Aston Martin Vantage AMR GT3 Evo	Aston Martin M177 4.0 L Turbo V8	34	P	(United Arab Emirates) Jamie Day	All
(Germany) natural elements by Walkenhorst Motorsport	Aston Martin Vantage AMR GT3 Evo	Aston Martin M177 4.0 L Turbo V8	34	P	(Norway) Christian Krognes	All
(Germany) Walkenhorst Motorsport	Aston Martin Vantage AMR GT3 Evo	Aston Martin M177 4.0 L Turbo V8	35	S	(Ecuador) Mateo Villagomez	All
(Germany) Walkenhorst Motorsport	Aston Martin Vantage AMR GT3 Evo	Aston Martin M177 4.0 L Turbo V8	35	S	(France) Gaspard Simon	1, 3–4, 7
(Germany) Walkenhorst Motorsport	Aston Martin Vantage AMR GT3 Evo	Aston Martin M177 4.0 L Turbo V8	35	S	(Switzerland) Ethan Ischer	1, 3–4, 7
(Germany) Walkenhorst Motorsport	Aston Martin Vantage AMR GT3 Evo	Aston Martin M177 4.0 L Turbo V8	35	S	(France) Maxime Robin	4
(Germany) Walkenhorst Motorsport	Aston Martin Vantage AMR GT3 Evo	Aston Martin M177 4.0 L Turbo V8	35	S	(Switzerland) Lucas Légeret	10
(Germany) Walkenhorst Motorsport	Aston Martin Vantage AMR GT3 Evo	Aston Martin M177 4.0 L Turbo V8	35	S	(Slovenia) Mark Kastelic	10
(Austria) Razoon – more than racing (Note: While Denny Berndt, Leo Pichler and Luca Rettenbacher were set to compete in the Silver Cup with Razoon – more than racing, only Pichler would make an appearance at the final round in the Bronze Cup.)	Porsche 911 GT3 R (992.2)	Porsche M97/80 4.2 L Flat-6	41	B	(Brazil) Marcos Gomes	10
(Austria) Razoon – more than racing	Porsche 911 GT3 R (992.2)	Porsche M97/80 4.2 L Flat-6	41	B	(Brazil) Alan Hellmeister	10
(Austria) Razoon – more than racing	Porsche 911 GT3 R (992.2)	Porsche M97/80 4.2 L Flat-6	41	B	(Brazil) Sebastião Malucelli	10
(Austria) Razoon – more than racing	Porsche 911 GT3 R (992.2)	Porsche M97/80 4.2 L Flat-6	914	B	(Austria) Dominik Olbert	1
(Austria) Razoon – more than racing	Porsche 911 GT3 R (992.2)	Porsche M97/80 4.2 L Flat-6	914	B	(Belgium) Benjamin Paque	1
(Austria) Razoon – more than racing	Porsche 911 GT3 R (992.2)	Porsche M97/80 4.2 L Flat-6	914	B	(Austria) Gerhard Tweraser	1
(Austria) Razoon – more than racing	Porsche 911 GT3 R (992.2)	Porsche M97/80 4.2 L Flat-6	914	B	(Greece) Georgios Kolovos	3
(Austria) Razoon – more than racing	Porsche 911 GT3 R (992.2)	Porsche M97/80 4.2 L Flat-6	914	B	(Greece) Stylianos Kolovos	3
(Austria) Razoon – more than racing	Porsche 911 GT3 R (992.2)	Porsche M97/80 4.2 L Flat-6	914	B	(Germany) Lenny Ried	3
(Austria) Razoon – more than racing	Porsche 911 GT3 R (992.2)	Porsche M97/80 4.2 L Flat-6	914	B	(Germany) Max Mutschlechner	10
(Austria) Razoon – more than racing	Porsche 911 GT3 R (992.2)	Porsche M97/80 4.2 L Flat-6	914	B	(Austria) Leo Pichler	10
(Austria) Razoon – more than racing	Porsche 911 GT3 R (992.2)	Porsche M97/80 4.2 L Flat-6	914	B	(Austria) Richard Wolf	10
(Austria) Razoon – more than racing	Porsche 911 GT3 R (992.2)	Porsche M97/80 4.2 L Flat-6	914	PA	(United Kingdom) Kenzie Reiss Beecroft	4
(Austria) Razoon – more than racing	Porsche 911 GT3 R (992.2)	Porsche M97/80 4.2 L Flat-6	914	PA	(Thailand) Carl Bennett	4
(Austria) Razoon – more than racing	Porsche 911 GT3 R (992.2)	Porsche M97/80 4.2 L Flat-6	914	PA	(Australia) Bryce Fullwood	4
(Austria) Razoon – more than racing	Porsche 911 GT3 R (992.2)	Porsche M97/80 4.2 L Flat-6	914	PA	(United Kingdom) Edward McDermott	4
Oman Racing by Century Motorsport	BMW M4 GT3 Evo	BMW P58 3.0 L Turbo I6	42	B	(Oman) Ahmad Al Harthy	All
Oman Racing by Century Motorsport	BMW M4 GT3 Evo	BMW P58 3.0 L Turbo I6	42	B	(Spain) Javier Sagrera	All
Oman Racing by Century Motorsport	BMW M4 GT3 Evo	BMW P58 3.0 L Turbo I6	42	B	(Australia) Calan Williams	All
Oman Racing by Century Motorsport	BMW M4 GT3 Evo	BMW P58 3.0 L Turbo I6	42	B	(Brazil) Pedro Ebrahim	4
(United Kingdom) Greystone GT	McLaren 720S GT3 Evo	McLaren M840T 4.0 L Turbo V8	44	S	(Australia) Jayden Kelly	All
(United Kingdom) Greystone GT	McLaren 720S GT3 Evo	McLaren M840T 4.0 L Turbo V8	44	S	(Spain) Tommy Pintos	All
(United Kingdom) Greystone GT	McLaren 720S GT3 Evo	McLaren M840T 4.0 L Turbo V8	44	S	(United Kingdom) Josh Rattican	All
(United Kingdom) Greystone GT	McLaren 720S GT3 Evo	McLaren M840T 4.0 L Turbo V8	44	S	(United Kingdom) Zac Meakin	4
(Germany) Rinaldi Racing	Ferrari 296 GT3 Evo	Ferrari F163CE 3.0 L Turbo V6	45	S	(United States) Dylan Medler	All
(Germany) Rinaldi Racing	Ferrari 296 GT3 Evo	Ferrari F163CE 3.0 L Turbo V6	45	S	(South Africa) David Perel	All
(Germany) Rinaldi Racing	Ferrari 296 GT3 Evo	Ferrari F163CE 3.0 L Turbo V6	45	S	(Spain) Rafael Duran	1, 3–4, 7
(Germany) Rinaldi Racing	Ferrari 296 GT3 Evo	Ferrari F163CE 3.0 L Turbo V6	45	S	(Italy) Alessandro Balzan	4
(Germany) Rinaldi Racing	Ferrari 296 GT3 Evo	Ferrari F163CE 3.0 L Turbo V6	45	S	(Zimbabwe) Axcil Jefferies	10
(United States) Mercedes-AMG Team Mann-Filter	Mercedes-AMG GT3 Evo	Mercedes-AMG M159 6.2 L V8	48	P	(Austria) Lucas Auer	All
(United States) Mercedes-AMG Team Mann-Filter	Mercedes-AMG GT3 Evo	Mercedes-AMG M159 6.2 L V8	48	P	(Germany) Maro Engel	All
(United States) Mercedes-AMG Team Mann-Filter	Mercedes-AMG GT3 Evo	Mercedes-AMG M159 6.2 L V8	48	P	(Germany) Luca Stolz	All
(United States) Winward Racing	Mercedes-AMG GT3 Evo	Mercedes-AMG M159 6.2 L V8	87	B	(Germany) Marvin Dienst	All
(United States) Winward Racing	Mercedes-AMG GT3 Evo	Mercedes-AMG M159 6.2 L V8	87	B	(Italy) Gabriele Piana	All
(United States) Winward Racing	Mercedes-AMG GT3 Evo	Mercedes-AMG M159 6.2 L V8	87	B	(Russia) Rinat Salikhov	All
(United States) Winward Racing	Mercedes-AMG GT3 Evo	Mercedes-AMG M159 6.2 L V8	87	B	(Netherlands) Daan Arrow	4
(Italy) AF Corse	Ferrari 296 GT3 Evo	Ferrari F163CE 3.0 L Turbo V6	50	P	(Monaco) Arthur Leclerc	All
(Italy) AF Corse	Ferrari 296 GT3 Evo	Ferrari F163CE 3.0 L Turbo V6	50	P	(France) Lilou Wadoux	All
(Italy) AF Corse	Ferrari 296 GT3 Evo	Ferrari F163CE 3.0 L Turbo V6	50	P	(Indonesia) Sean Gelael	1, 3–4, 7
(Italy) AF Corse	Ferrari 296 GT3 Evo	Ferrari F163CE 3.0 L Turbo V6	50	P	(Spain) Albert Costa	10
(Italy) AF Corse	Ferrari 296 GT3 Evo	Ferrari F163CE 3.0 L Turbo V6	51	P	(Italy) Tommaso Mosca	All
(Italy) AF Corse	Ferrari 296 GT3 Evo	Ferrari F163CE 3.0 L Turbo V6	51	P	(Denmark) Nicklas Nielsen	1, 3–4, 7
(Italy) AF Corse	Ferrari 296 GT3 Evo	Ferrari F163CE 3.0 L Turbo V6	51	P	(Italy) Alessio Rovera	1, 3–4, 7
(Italy) AF Corse	Ferrari 296 GT3 Evo	Ferrari F163CE 3.0 L Turbo V6	51	P	(Italy) Lorenzo Ferrari	10
(Italy) AF Corse	Ferrari 296 GT3 Evo	Ferrari F163CE 3.0 L Turbo V6	51	P	(Italy) Nicola Lacorte	10
(Italy) AF Corse	Ferrari 296 GT3 Evo	Ferrari F163CE 3.0 L Turbo V6	52	S	(Belgium) Jef Machiels	All
(Italy) AF Corse	Ferrari 296 GT3 Evo	Ferrari F163CE 3.0 L Turbo V6	52	S	(Belgium) Gilles Stadsbader	All
(Italy) AF Corse	Ferrari 296 GT3 Evo	Ferrari F163CE 3.0 L Turbo V6	52	S	(Peru) Matías Zagazeta	All
(Italy) AF Corse	Ferrari 296 GT3 Evo	Ferrari F163CE 3.0 L Turbo V6	52	S	(Italy) Francesco Braschi	4
(Italy) AF Corse	Ferrari 296 GT3 Evo	Ferrari F163CE 3.0 L Turbo V6	70	PA	(Republic of Ireland) Peter Dempsey	4
(Italy) AF Corse	Ferrari 296 GT3 Evo	Ferrari F163CE 3.0 L Turbo V6	70	PA	(Spain) Miguel Molina	4
(Italy) AF Corse	Ferrari 296 GT3 Evo	Ferrari F163CE 3.0 L Turbo V6	70	PA	(United States) Custodio Toledo	4
(Italy) AF Corse	Ferrari 296 GT3 Evo	Ferrari F163CE 3.0 L Turbo V6	70	PA	(France) Matthieu Vaxivière	4
(Denmark) Selected Car Racing	Ferrari 296 GT3 Evo	Ferrari F163CE 3.0 L Turbo V6	71	G	(Denmark) Simon Birch	All
(Denmark) Selected Car Racing	Ferrari 296 GT3 Evo	Ferrari F163CE 3.0 L Turbo V6	71	G	(Denmark) Malte Ebdrup	All
(Denmark) Selected Car Racing	Ferrari 296 GT3 Evo	Ferrari F163CE 3.0 L Turbo V6	71	G	(Denmark) Frederik Schandorff	All
(Denmark) Selected Car Racing	Ferrari 296 GT3 Evo	Ferrari F163CE 3.0 L Turbo V6	71	G	(Denmark) Conrad Laursen	4
(Italy) Dinamic GT	Porsche 911 GT3 R (992.2)	Porsche M97/80 4.2 L Flat-6	54	S	(Thailand) Tanart Sathienthirakul	All
(Italy) Dinamic GT	Porsche 911 GT3 R (992.2)	Porsche M97/80 4.2 L Flat-6	54	S	(Italy) Francesco Simonazzi	All
(Italy) Dinamic GT	Porsche 911 GT3 R (992.2)	Porsche M97/80 4.2 L Flat-6	54	S	(United Kingdom) Angus Whiteside	All
(Italy) Dinamic GT	Porsche 911 GT3 R (992.2)	Porsche M97/80 4.2 L Flat-6	54	S	(France) Loris Cabirou	4
(United Kingdom) Ecurie Ecosse Blackthorn	Aston Martin Vantage AMR GT3 Evo	Aston Martin M177 4.0 L Turbo V8	56	B	(United Kingdom) Jonny Adam	1, 3–4
(United Kingdom) Ecurie Ecosse Blackthorn	Aston Martin Vantage AMR GT3 Evo	Aston Martin M177 4.0 L Turbo V8	56	B	(Italy) Giacomo Petrobelli	1, 3–4
(United Kingdom) Ecurie Ecosse Blackthorn	Aston Martin Vantage AMR GT3 Evo	Aston Martin M177 4.0 L Turbo V8	56	B	(United Kingdom) Lorcan Hanafin	3–4
(United Kingdom) Ecurie Ecosse Blackthorn	Aston Martin Vantage AMR GT3 Evo	Aston Martin M177 4.0 L Turbo V8	56	B	(United Kingdom) Tom Wood	1
(United Kingdom) Ecurie Ecosse Blackthorn	Aston Martin Vantage AMR GT3 Evo	Aston Martin M177 4.0 L Turbo V8	56	B	(France) Romain Leroux	4
(United Kingdom) Garage 59	McLaren 720S GT3 Evo	McLaren M840T 4.0 L Turbo V8	58	G	(United Kingdom) Tom Fleming	All
(United Kingdom) Garage 59	McLaren 720S GT3 Evo	McLaren M840T 4.0 L Turbo V8	58	G	(Germany) Benjamin Goethe	All
(United Kingdom) Garage 59	McLaren 720S GT3 Evo	McLaren M840T 4.0 L Turbo V8	58	G	(Monaco) Louis Prette	All
(United Kingdom) Garage 59	McLaren 720S GT3 Evo	McLaren M840T 4.0 L Turbo V8	59	P	(United Kingdom) Joseph Loake	All
(United Kingdom) Garage 59	McLaren 720S GT3 Evo	McLaren M840T 4.0 L Turbo V8	59	P	(United Kingdom) Dean MacDonald	All
(United Kingdom) Garage 59	McLaren 720S GT3 Evo	McLaren M840T 4.0 L Turbo V8	59	P	(Germany) Marvin Kirchhöfer	1, 3–4, 7
(United Kingdom) Garage 59	McLaren 720S GT3 Evo	McLaren M840T 4.0 L Turbo V8	59	P	(United Kingdom) Jack Hawksworth	10
(United Kingdom) JMW Motorsport (Note: Hunter Abbott was announced as a driver for the JMW Motorsport Ferrari early in the season, but he ultimately did not make an appearance.)	Ferrari 296 GT3 Evo	Ferrari F163CE 3.0 L Turbo V6	60	B	(Germany) Tim Heinemann	1, 3–4
(United Kingdom) JMW Motorsport	Ferrari 296 GT3 Evo	Ferrari F163CE 3.0 L Turbo V6	60	B	(Switzerland) Rolf Ineichen	1, 3–4
(United Kingdom) JMW Motorsport	Ferrari 296 GT3 Evo	Ferrari F163CE 3.0 L Turbo V6	60	B	(Germany) Thomas Kiefer	3–4
(United Kingdom) JMW Motorsport	Ferrari 296 GT3 Evo	Ferrari F163CE 3.0 L Turbo V6	60	B	(United States) Chandler Hull	1
(United Kingdom) JMW Motorsport	Ferrari 296 GT3 Evo	Ferrari F163CE 3.0 L Turbo V6	60	B	(France) Pierre-Louis Chovet	4
(United Kingdom) JMW Motorsport	Ferrari 296 GT3 Evo	Ferrari F163CE 3.0 L Turbo V6	60	P	(Germany) Tim Heinemann	7
(United Kingdom) JMW Motorsport	Ferrari 296 GT3 Evo	Ferrari F163CE 3.0 L Turbo V6	60	P	(Finland) Konsta Lappalainen	7
(United Kingdom) JMW Motorsport	Ferrari 296 GT3 Evo	Ferrari F163CE 3.0 L Turbo V6	60	P	(Netherlands) Thierry Vermeulen	7
(United Kingdom) JMW Motorsport	Ferrari 296 GT3 Evo	Ferrari F163CE 3.0 L Turbo V6	60	G	(San Marino) Giacomo Altoé	10
(United Kingdom) JMW Motorsport	Ferrari 296 GT3 Evo	Ferrari F163CE 3.0 L Turbo V6	60	G	(Finland) Konsta Lappalainen	10
(United Kingdom) JMW Motorsport	Ferrari 296 GT3 Evo	Ferrari F163CE 3.0 L Turbo V6	60	G	(United Kingdom) Casper Stevenson	10
(Austria) TGI Team by GRT	Lamborghini Temerario GT3	Lamborghini L411 4.0 L Turbo V8	63	P	(Italy) Mirko Bortolotti	All
(Austria) TGI Team by GRT	Lamborghini Temerario GT3	Lamborghini L411 4.0 L Turbo V8	63	P	(France) Franck Perera	All
(Austria) TGI Team by GRT	Lamborghini Temerario GT3	Lamborghini L411 4.0 L Turbo V8	63	P	(Germany) Maximilian Paul	1, 3–4, 10
(Austria) TGI Team by GRT	Lamborghini Temerario GT3	Lamborghini L411 4.0 L Turbo V8	63	P	(United Kingdom) Sandy Mitchell	7
(Germany) HRT Ford Racing	Ford Mustang GT3 Evo	Ford Coyote 5.4 L V8	64	P	(France) Thomas Drouet	All
(Germany) HRT Ford Racing	Ford Mustang GT3 Evo	Ford Coyote 5.4 L V8	64	P	(India) Arjun Maini	All
(Germany) HRT Ford Racing	Ford Mustang GT3 Evo	Ford Coyote 5.4 L V8	64	P	(Switzerland) Fabio Scherer	All
(Germany) HRT Ford Racing	Ford Mustang GT3 Evo	Ford Coyote 5.4 L V8	65	S	(Philippines) Eduardo Coseteng	All
(Germany) HRT Ford Racing	Ford Mustang GT3 Evo	Ford Coyote 5.4 L V8	65	S	(Netherlands) Maxime Oosten	1, 3–4, 10
(Germany) HRT Ford Racing	Ford Mustang GT3 Evo	Ford Coyote 5.4 L V8	65	S	(Germany) Finn Wiebelhaus	1, 3–4
(Germany) HRT Ford Racing	Ford Mustang GT3 Evo	Ford Coyote 5.4 L V8	65	S	(Belgium) Nicolas Baert	7, 10
(Germany) HRT Ford Racing	Ford Mustang GT3 Evo	Ford Coyote 5.4 L V8	65	S	(Germany) Max Reis	4
(Germany) HRT Ford Racing	Ford Mustang GT3 Evo	Ford Coyote 5.4 L V8	65	S	(Germany) Niklas Kalus	7
(Mexico) Grupo Prom Racing Team (Note: The No. 177 Grupo Prom Racing car was set to have Ralf Aron as one of the professional drivers, but he would not appear in that car, instead making just one appearance for GetSpeed in the final round.)	Mercedes-AMG GT3 Evo	Mercedes-AMG M159 6.2 L V8	177	B	(Netherlands) Colin Caresani	1, 3, 7
(Mexico) Grupo Prom Racing Team	Mercedes-AMG GT3 Evo	Mercedes-AMG M159 6.2 L V8	177	B	(Mexico) Alfredo Hernández	1, 3, 7
(Mexico) Grupo Prom Racing Team	Mercedes-AMG GT3 Evo	Mercedes-AMG M159 6.2 L V8	177	B	(France) Stéphane Tribaudini	1, 3, 7
(Mexico) Grupo Prom Racing Team	Mercedes-AMG GT3 Evo	Mercedes-AMG M159 6.2 L V8	177	PA	(Netherlands) Colin Caresani	4
(Mexico) Grupo Prom Racing Team	Mercedes-AMG GT3 Evo	Mercedes-AMG M159 6.2 L V8	177	PA	(United Kingdom) Adam Christodoulou	4
(Mexico) Grupo Prom Racing Team	Mercedes-AMG GT3 Evo	Mercedes-AMG M159 6.2 L V8	177	PA	(Mexico) Alfredo Hernández	4
(Mexico) Grupo Prom Racing Team	Mercedes-AMG GT3 Evo	Mercedes-AMG M159 6.2 L V8	177	PA	(France) Stéphane Tribaudini	4
(Germany) Tresor Attempto Racing	Audi R8 LMS Evo II	Audi DAR 5.2 L V10	66	S	(Israel) Ariel Levi	All
(Germany) Tresor Attempto Racing	Audi R8 LMS Evo II	Audi DAR 5.2 L V10	66	S	(Italy) Rocco Mazzola	All
(Germany) Tresor Attempto Racing	Audi R8 LMS Evo II	Audi DAR 5.2 L V10	66	S	(Denmark) Sebastian Øgaard	All
(Germany) Tresor Attempto Racing	Audi R8 LMS Evo II	Audi DAR 5.2 L V10	66	S	(Slovenia) Mark Kastelic	4
(Germany) Tresor Attempto Racing	Audi R8 LMS Evo II	Audi DAR 5.2 L V10	88	B	(Italy) Daniele Di Amato	All
(Germany) Tresor Attempto Racing	Audi R8 LMS Evo II	Audi DAR 5.2 L V10	88	B	(Germany) Carrie Schreiner	All
(Germany) Tresor Attempto Racing	Audi R8 LMS Evo II	Audi DAR 5.2 L V10	88	B	(Austria) Gerhard Tweraser	3, 7
(Germany) Tresor Attempto Racing	Audi R8 LMS Evo II	Audi DAR 5.2 L V10	88	B	(Italy) Alberto Di Folco	1
(Germany) Tresor Attempto Racing	Audi R8 LMS Evo II	Audi DAR 5.2 L V10	88	B	(Greece) Georgios Kolovos	4
(Germany) Tresor Attempto Racing	Audi R8 LMS Evo II	Audi DAR 5.2 L V10	88	B	(Brazil) Sérgio Sette Câmara	4
(Germany) Tresor Attempto Racing	Audi R8 LMS Evo II	Audi DAR 5.2 L V10	88	B	(Russia) Alexey Nesov	10
(Germany) Tresor Attempto Racing	Audi R8 LMS Evo II	Audi DAR 5.2 L V10	99	G	(Italy) Andrea Frassineti	All
(Germany) Tresor Attempto Racing	Audi R8 LMS Evo II	Audi DAR 5.2 L V10	99	G	(Luxembourg) Dylan Pereira	All
(Germany) Tresor Attempto Racing	Audi R8 LMS Evo II	Audi DAR 5.2 L V10	99	G	(Germany) Alex Aka	1, 4, 7, 10
(Germany) Tresor Attempto Racing	Audi R8 LMS Evo II	Audi DAR 5.2 L V10	99	G	(Italy) Lorenzo Ferrari	3
(Switzerland) Kessel Racing (Note: Kessel Racing was set to enter two cars in both the Sprint and Endurance Cups. However, the No. 76 car did not appear at all throughout the season.)	Ferrari 296 GT3 Evo	Ferrari F163CE 3.0 L Turbo V6	74	B	(Germany) Dennis Marschall	All
(Switzerland) Kessel Racing	Ferrari 296 GT3 Evo	Ferrari F163CE 3.0 L Turbo V6	74	B	(United States) Dustin Blattner	1, 3–4, 10
(Switzerland) Kessel Racing	Ferrari 296 GT3 Evo	Ferrari F163CE 3.0 L Turbo V6	74	B	(Italy) Lorenzo Patrese	1, 3, 7, 10
(Switzerland) Kessel Racing	Ferrari 296 GT3 Evo	Ferrari F163CE 3.0 L Turbo V6	74	B	(France) Mathys Jaubert	4
(Switzerland) Kessel Racing	Ferrari 296 GT3 Evo	Ferrari F163CE 3.0 L Turbo V6	74	B	(United Kingdom) Ben Tuck	4
(Switzerland) Kessel Racing	Ferrari 296 GT3 Evo	Ferrari F163CE 3.0 L Turbo V6	74	B	(United Arab Emirates) Constantin Dressler	7
(Netherlands) KPX Motorsport	BMW M4 GT3 Evo	BMW P58 3.0 L Turbo I6	77	B	(Netherlands) Yelmer Buurman	10
(Netherlands) KPX Motorsport	BMW M4 GT3 Evo	BMW P58 3.0 L Turbo I6	77	B	(Netherlands) Jop Rappange	10
(Netherlands) KPX Motorsport	BMW M4 GT3 Evo	BMW P58 3.0 L Turbo I6	77	B	(Netherlands) Nigel Schoonderwoerd	10
(San Marino) Tsunami RT	Porsche 911 GT3 R (992.2)	Porsche M97/80 4.2 L Flat-6	79	PA	(Italy) Fabio Babini	4
(San Marino) Tsunami RT	Porsche 911 GT3 R (992.2)	Porsche M97/80 4.2 L Flat-6	79	PA	(Japan) Hiroshi Hamaguchi	4
(San Marino) Tsunami RT	Porsche 911 GT3 R (992.2)	Porsche M97/80 4.2 L Flat-6	79	PA	(Germany) Nico Menzel	4
(San Marino) Tsunami RT	Porsche 911 GT3 R (992.2)	Porsche M97/80 4.2 L Flat-6	79	PA	(Italy) Johannes Zelger	4
(Germany) Lionspeed GP	Porsche 911 GT3 R (992.2)	Porsche M97/80 4.2 L Flat-6	80	P	(Denmark) Bastian Buus	All
(Germany) Lionspeed GP	Porsche 911 GT3 R (992.2)	Porsche M97/80 4.2 L Flat-6	80	P	(Switzerland) Ricardo Feller	All
(Germany) Lionspeed GP	Porsche 911 GT3 R (992.2)	Porsche M97/80 4.2 L Flat-6	80	P	(Austria) Thomas Preining	All
(Germany) Lionspeed GP	Porsche 911 GT3 R (992.2)	Porsche M97/80 4.2 L Flat-6	89	B	(Switzerland) Alex Fontana	All
(Germany) Lionspeed GP	Porsche 911 GT3 R (992.2)	Porsche M97/80 4.2 L Flat-6	89	B	(Germany) Patrick Kolb	All
(Germany) Lionspeed GP	Porsche 911 GT3 R (992.2)	Porsche M97/80 4.2 L Flat-6	89	B	(United Arab Emirates) Bashar Mardini	All
(Germany) Lionspeed GP	Porsche 911 GT3 R (992.2)	Porsche M97/80 4.2 L Flat-6	89	B	(Zimbabwe) Axcil Jefferies	4
(Austria) Eastalent Racing	Audi R8 LMS Evo II	Audi DAR 5.2 L V10	84	P	(Germany) Christopher Haase	All
(Austria) Eastalent Racing	Audi R8 LMS Evo II	Audi DAR 5.2 L V10	84	P	(Austria) Simon Reicher	All
(Austria) Eastalent Racing	Audi R8 LMS Evo II	Audi DAR 5.2 L V10	84	P	(Germany) Markus Winkelhock	All
(Denmark) High Class Racing	Porsche 911 GT3 R (992.2)	Porsche M97/80 4.2 L Flat-6	86	PA	(Denmark) Anders Fjordbach	4
(Denmark) High Class Racing	Porsche 911 GT3 R (992.2)	Porsche M97/80 4.2 L Flat-6	86	PA	(China) Kerong Li	4
(Denmark) High Class Racing	Porsche 911 GT3 R (992.2)	Porsche M97/80 4.2 L Flat-6	86	PA	(China) Hongli Ye	4
(Denmark) High Class Racing	Porsche 911 GT3 R (992.2)	Porsche M97/80 4.2 L Flat-6	86	PA	(China) Bo Yuan	4
(Denmark) High Class Racing	Porsche 911 GT3 R (992.2)	Porsche M97/80 4.2 L Flat-6	269	B	(Austria) Klaus Bachler	10
(Denmark) High Class Racing	Porsche 911 GT3 R (992.2)	Porsche M97/80 4.2 L Flat-6	269	B	(Germany) Max Moritz	10
(Denmark) High Class Racing	Porsche 911 GT3 R (992.2)	Porsche M97/80 4.2 L Flat-6	269	B	(Austria) Raphael Rennhofer	10
(Germany) Herberth Motorsport	Porsche 911 GT3 R (992.2)	Porsche M97/80 4.2 L Flat-6	91	B	(Germany) Ralf Bohn	All
(Germany) Herberth Motorsport	Porsche 911 GT3 R (992.2)	Porsche M97/80 4.2 L Flat-6	91	B	(Netherlands) Huub van Eijndhoven	All
(Germany) Herberth Motorsport	Porsche 911 GT3 R (992.2)	Porsche M97/80 4.2 L Flat-6	91	B	(Germany) Robert Renauer	1, 3, 7, 10
(Germany) Herberth Motorsport	Porsche 911 GT3 R (992.2)	Porsche M97/80 4.2 L Flat-6	91	B	(France) Mathieu Jaminet	4
(Germany) Herberth Motorsport	Porsche 911 GT3 R (992.2)	Porsche M97/80 4.2 L Flat-6	91	B	(Germany) Alfred Renauer	4
(United Kingdom) Ziggo Sport Tempesta Racing (Note: Daniil Move appeared on the entry list for the Ziggo Sport Tempesta Porsche at Circuit Paul Ricard but withdrew, making no further appearances.)	Porsche 911 GT3 R (992.2)	Porsche M97/80 4.2 L Flat-6	93	B	(Italy) Eddie Cheever III	All
(United Kingdom) Ziggo Sport Tempesta Racing	Porsche 911 GT3 R (992.2)	Porsche M97/80 4.2 L Flat-6	93	B	(United Kingdom) Chris Froggatt	All
(United Kingdom) Ziggo Sport Tempesta Racing	Porsche 911 GT3 R (992.2)	Porsche M97/80 4.2 L Flat-6	93	B	(Hong Kong) Jonathan Hui	3–4
(United Kingdom) Ziggo Sport Tempesta Racing	Porsche 911 GT3 R (992.2)	Porsche M97/80 4.2 L Flat-6	93	B	(Italy) Stefano Costantini	1
(United Kingdom) Ziggo Sport Tempesta Racing	Porsche 911 GT3 R (992.2)	Porsche M97/80 4.2 L Flat-6	93	B	(Netherlands) Mex Jansen	4
(United Kingdom) Ziggo Sport Tempesta Racing	Porsche 911 GT3 R (992.2)	Porsche M97/80 4.2 L Flat-6	93	B	(Republic of Ireland) Peter Dempsey	7
(United Kingdom) Ziggo Sport Tempesta Racing	Porsche 911 GT3 R (992.2)	Porsche M97/80 4.2 L Flat-6	93	B	(Germany) Lucas Wolf	10
(Germany) Rutronik Racing	Lamborghini Temerario GT3	Lamborghini L411 4.0 L Turbo V8	96	P	(Germany) Luca Engstler	All
(Germany) Rutronik Racing	Lamborghini Temerario GT3	Lamborghini L411 4.0 L Turbo V8	96	P	(Italy) Marco Mapelli	All
(Germany) Rutronik Racing	Lamborghini Temerario GT3	Lamborghini L411 4.0 L Turbo V8	96	P	(Switzerland) Patric Niederhauser	All
(Germany) Rutronik Racing	Porsche 911 GT3 R (992.2)	Porsche M97/80 4.2 L Flat-6	97	B	(Hong Kong) Antares Au	1, 3–4, 7
(Germany) Rutronik Racing	Porsche 911 GT3 R (992.2)	Porsche M97/80 4.2 L Flat-6	97	B	(Italy) Riccardo Pera	1, 3, 7
(Germany) Rutronik Racing	Porsche 911 GT3 R (992.2)	Porsche M97/80 4.2 L Flat-6	97	B	(Germany) Sven Müller	3–4, 7
(Germany) Rutronik Racing	Porsche 911 GT3 R (992.2)	Porsche M97/80 4.2 L Flat-6	97	B	(Netherlands) Loek Hartog	1
(Germany) Rutronik Racing	Porsche 911 GT3 R (992.2)	Porsche M97/80 4.2 L Flat-6	97	B	(Denmark) Michelle Gatting	4
(Germany) Rutronik Racing	Porsche 911 GT3 R (992.2)	Porsche M97/80 4.2 L Flat-6	97	B	(Estonia) Martin Rump	4
(Germany) ROWE Racing	BMW M4 GT3 Evo	BMW P58 3.0 L Turbo I6	98	P	(United Kingdom) Jake Dennis	All
(Germany) ROWE Racing	BMW M4 GT3 Evo	BMW P58 3.0 L Turbo I6	98	P	(Brazil) Augusto Farfus	1, 3–4, 7
(Germany) ROWE Racing	BMW M4 GT3 Evo	BMW P58 3.0 L Turbo I6	98	P	(Switzerland) Raffaele Marciello	1, 3–4, 7
(Germany) ROWE Racing	BMW M4 GT3 Evo	BMW P58 3.0 L Turbo I6	98	P	(Austria) Philipp Eng	10
(Germany) ROWE Racing	BMW M4 GT3 Evo	BMW P58 3.0 L Turbo I6	98	P	(Germany) Marco Wittmann	10
(Germany) ROWE Racing	BMW M4 GT3 Evo	BMW P58 3.0 L Turbo I6	998	G	(Germany) Jens Klingmann	All
(Germany) ROWE Racing	BMW M4 GT3 Evo	BMW P58 3.0 L Turbo I6	998	G	(Germany) Tim Tramnitz	All
(Germany) ROWE Racing	BMW M4 GT3 Evo	BMW P58 3.0 L Turbo I6	998	G	(Belgium) Ugo de Wilde	All
(France) CSA Racing	McLaren 720S GT3 Evo	McLaren M840T 4.0 L Turbo V8	111	G	(France) Simon Gachet	All
(France) CSA Racing	McLaren 720S GT3 Evo	McLaren M840T 4.0 L Turbo V8	111	G	(United Kingdom) James Kell	All
(France) CSA Racing	McLaren 720S GT3 Evo	McLaren M840T 4.0 L Turbo V8	111	G	(France) Arthur Rougier	1, 3–4, 7
(France) CSA Racing	McLaren 720S GT3 Evo	McLaren M840T 4.0 L Turbo V8	111	G	(France) Jim Pla	4, 10
(France) CSA Racing	McLaren 720S GT3 Evo	McLaren M840T 4.0 L Turbo V8	555	S	(France) Romain Andriolo	1, 3–4, 7
(France) CSA Racing	McLaren 720S GT3 Evo	McLaren M840T 4.0 L Turbo V8	555	S	(Belgium) Baptiste Moulin	1, 3–4
(France) CSA Racing	McLaren 720S GT3 Evo	McLaren M840T 4.0 L Turbo V8	555	S	(Belgium) Lorens Lecertua	1, 3–4
(France) CSA Racing	McLaren 720S GT3 Evo	McLaren M840T 4.0 L Turbo V8	555	S	(United Kingdom) James Higgins	7, 10
(France) CSA Racing	McLaren 720S GT3 Evo	McLaren M840T 4.0 L Turbo V8	555	S	(France) Jean-Baptiste Simmenauer	7, 10
(France) CSA Racing	McLaren 720S GT3 Evo	McLaren M840T 4.0 L Turbo V8	555	S	(India) Sai Sanjay	4
(France) CSA Racing	McLaren 720S GT3 Evo	McLaren M840T 4.0 L Turbo V8	555	S	(France) Loris Cabirou	10
(Belgium) Muehlner Motorsport	Porsche 911 GT3 R (992.2)	Porsche M97/80 4.2 L Flat-6	123	B	(Belgium) Armand Fumal	4
(Belgium) Muehlner Motorsport	Porsche 911 GT3 R (992.2)	Porsche M97/80 4.2 L Flat-6	123	B	(Australia) Bayley Hall	4
(Belgium) Muehlner Motorsport	Porsche 911 GT3 R (992.2)	Porsche M97/80 4.2 L Flat-6	123	B	(Australia) Andres Latorre	4
(Belgium) Muehlner Motorsport	Porsche 911 GT3 R (992.2)	Porsche M97/80 4.2 L Flat-6	123	B	(Germany) Tobias Müller	4
(United Kingdom) Paradine Competition	BMW M4 GT3 Evo	BMW P58 3.0 L Turbo I6	991	B	(United Kingdom) James Kellett	All
(United Kingdom) Paradine Competition	BMW M4 GT3 Evo	BMW P58 3.0 L Turbo I6	991	B	(United Kingdom) Darren Leung	All
(United Kingdom) Paradine Competition	BMW M4 GT3 Evo	BMW P58 3.0 L Turbo I6	991	B	(Belgium) Dries Vanthoor	1, 7
(United Kingdom) Paradine Competition	BMW M4 GT3 Evo	BMW P58 3.0 L Turbo I6	991	B	(Netherlands) Robert De Haan	3, 10
(United Kingdom) Paradine Competition	BMW M4 GT3 Evo	BMW P58 3.0 L Turbo I6	991	B	(South Africa) Leyton Fourie	4
(United Kingdom) Paradine Competition	BMW M4 GT3 Evo	BMW P58 3.0 L Turbo I6	991	B	(United Kingdom) David Pittard	4
(United Kingdom) Paradine Competition	BMW M4 GT3 Evo	BMW P58 3.0 L Turbo I6	992	S	(Brazil) Christian Hahn	3–4, 7, 10
(United Kingdom) Paradine Competition	BMW M4 GT3 Evo	BMW P58 3.0 L Turbo I6	992	S	(United Kingdom) Josh Rowledge	3–4, 7, 10
(United Kingdom) Paradine Competition	BMW M4 GT3 Evo	BMW P58 3.0 L Turbo I6	992	S	(United Kingdom) Bobby Thompson	3, 7
(United Kingdom) Paradine Competition	BMW M4 GT3 Evo	BMW P58 3.0 L Turbo I6	992	S	(Mexico) Ian Aguilera	4
(United Kingdom) Paradine Competition	BMW M4 GT3 Evo	BMW P58 3.0 L Turbo I6	992	S	(Netherlands) Jop Rappange	4
(United Kingdom) Paradine Competition	BMW M4 GT3 Evo	BMW P58 3.0 L Turbo I6	992	S	(United Kingdom) Daryl De Leon	10
(United Kingdom) Paradine Competition	BMW M4 GT3 Evo	BMW P58 3.0 L Turbo I6	992	G	(Netherlands) Robert De Haan	1
(United Kingdom) Paradine Competition	BMW M4 GT3 Evo	BMW P58 3.0 L Turbo I6	992	G	(Brazil) Christian Hahn	1
(United Kingdom) Paradine Competition	BMW M4 GT3 Evo	BMW P58 3.0 L Turbo I6	992	G	(United Kingdom) Ashley Sutton	1

Icon	Class
P	Pro (Overall)
G	Gold Cup
S	Silver Cup
B	Bronze Cup
PA	Pro-Am Cup

- The grid for the 2026 24 Hours of Spa was reduced from 70 to 69 cars as a result of the withdrawal of the No. 81 Bronze Cup Era Motorsport Porsche. Two drivers, Jake Hill and Kyle Tilley, were set to drive the car.
- Whilst on the initial season-entry list, the 75 Express Mercedes-AMG did not appear in 2026. Dominik Baumann, Hadrien David and Kenny Habul were set to be the drivers.

=== Driver and team changes ===
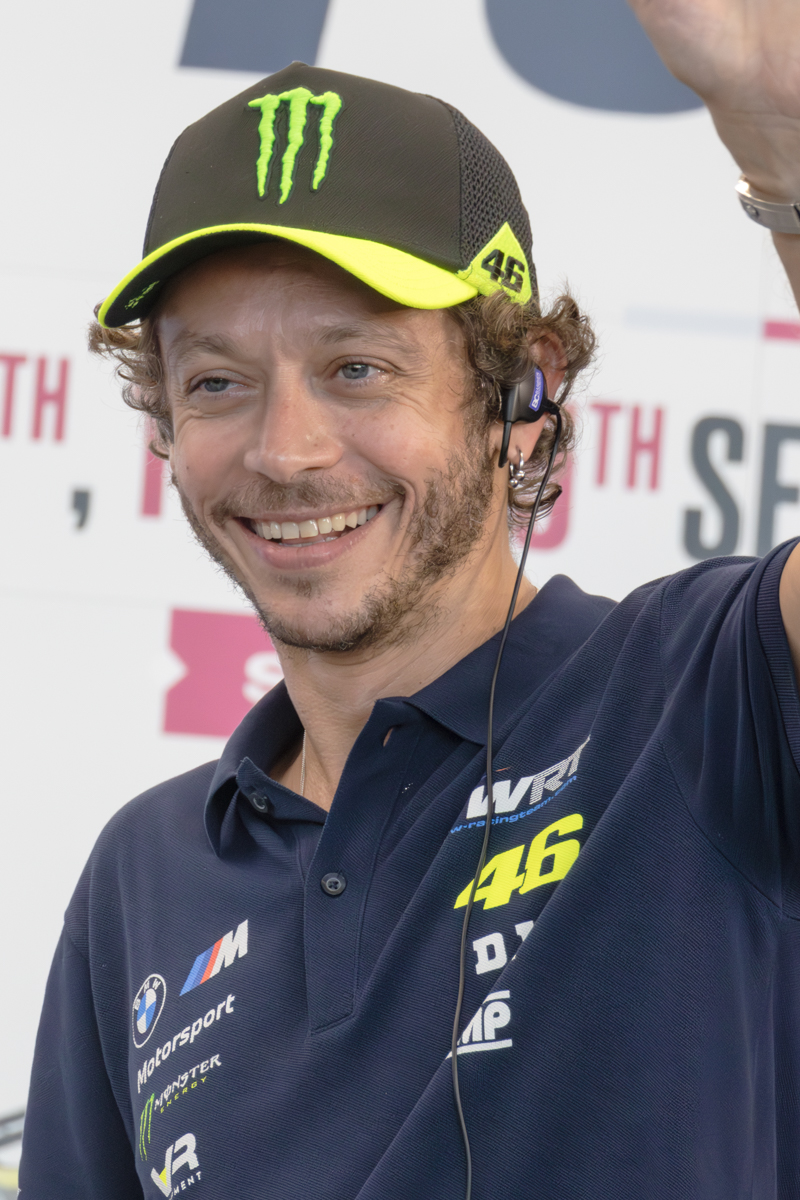
Seven-time MotoGP champion Valentino Rossi made his full-time championship return with Team WRT in the No. 46 BMW M4 GT3 Evo in 2026 alongside Max Hesse.

Rutronik Racing, the previous season's Endurance Cup winners and former Porsche partners, switched to Lamborghini for 2026. The team debuted the Lamborghini Temerario GT3 in the Pro class, with Patric Niederhauser and Luca Engstler competing in all 10 rounds.

Boutsen VDS, following its split from Mercedes-AMG, fielded two full-season Porsche entries. Dorian Boccolacci drove the Pro car at all rounds in 2026, with Gilles Magnus and Robin Knutsson competing in the Gold Cup with the other. Additional full-season Porsche entries came from Dinamic GT, Lionspeed GP, Pure Rxcing, and Ziggo Sport Tempesta Racing.

Verstappen Racing returned for a second season, now competing with a Pro, factory-backed Mercedes-AMG. Chris Lulham, the previous year's Gold Cup champion, initially partnered with Mercedes-AMG factory driver Daniel Juncadella for the full season. However, due to surgery, Lulham was replaced with Jules Gounon for several mid-season rounds. Winward Racing’s Mann-Filter No. 48 car returned for a third year with Lucas Auer and Maro Engel. The team also fielded a Bronze Cup car for Marvin Dienst and Rinat Salikhov. Additionally, GetSpeed entered two full-season Mercedes-AMGs: the No. 6 Silver Cup with Anthony Bartone and Aurélien Panis, and the No. 12 Bronze Cup with Gabriel Rindone and Fabian Schiller. Finally, 2 Seas Motorsport ran the No. 222 Mercedes-AMG, driven by 2025 British GT champions Charles Dawson and Kiern Jewiss.

Valentino Rossi returned full-time in 2026, driving the No. 46 Team WRT BMW alongside Max Hesse. In 2025, Rossi competed only at Spa and Misano. In the No. 32 car, reigning champions Kelvin van der Linde and Charles Weerts returned to defend their title, joined by Jordan Pepper for the Endurance Cup. Pepper also raced full-time, sharing duties with the No. 31 Sprint Cup car and teammate Amaury Cordeel. The No. 30 entry featured Matisse Lismont and Ignacio Montenegro in the Silver Cup. British squad Paradine Competition also entered a full-season BMW in the Bronze Cup, with Darren Leung at the wheel.

Comtoyou Racing expanded its European program with three full-season Aston Martin entries in 2026. Nicki Thiim primarily drove the No. 7 for overall honours. Alternatively, co-driver Kobe Pauwels switched between the No. 7 in Sprint Cup rounds and the No. 21 Silver Cup entry in Endurance rounds. He shared the No. 21 with Oliver Söderström, who also competed the full season. Marcelo Tomasoni drove the No. 11 Bronze Cup entry in all rounds. Walkenhorst Motorsport also fielded Aston Martins: the No. 34 competed in the Pro class for Endurance and Silver Cup for Sprint, while the No. 35 remained in Silver.

CSA Racing fielded two full-season McLaren entries. James Kell and Arthur Rougier drove the No. 111 in both the Sprint and Endurance Gold Cup. In the sister No. 555, Romain Andriolo competed, entering the Gold Cup for Sprint and Silver Cup for Endurance, with Simon Gachet sharing driving duties across both cars. Garage 59 also entered two McLarens: Marvin Kirchhöfer and Dean MacDonald in the No. 59 Pro car, and Tom Fleming and Louis Prette in the No. 58 Gold Cup entry. Optimum Motorsport completed the McLaren line-up with Guilherme Oliveira and Mikey Porter contesting the Gold Cup.

Reigning Bronze Cup champions Dustin Blattner and Dennis Marschall returned in 2026 with the aim of sharing the No. 74 Kessel Racing car after their dominant 2025 season. However, Blattner was not present at the Nürburgring or Barcelona rounds. AF Corse continued with Arthur Leclerc in the No. 50 and also fielded two additional full-season Ferraris.

After ending its factory sports car program, Audi returned to the overall championship for the first time since 2024 with Eastalent Racing. Christopher Haase and Simon Reicher drove the No. 84 in all 2026 rounds. Despite a lack of factory support, Audi entries continued to be fielded by Tresor Attempto Racing.

== Regulation changes ==
=== Sporting regulations ===
==== Qualifying format ====
As a result of growing grid sizes leading to heavy congestion problems during qualifying, 2026 saw the introduction of a new qualifying format. Split sessions were introduced for Sprint Cup rounds in 2025 and were extended to Endurance Cup rounds.

Qualifying still consisted of three segments, with the aggregate time for each car establishing the grid. The change is that these segments were split into two, with 10 minutes for the Silver and Bronze Cup cars (Group A) and 10 minutes for the Pro and Gold Cup runners (Group B). Q1A and Q1B ran back-to-back, followed by a five-minute break; the same format continued for Q2A and Q2B, and finally Q3A and Q3B.

For the 24 Hours of Spa, Group A was made up of Bronze and Pro-Am entries, before the Gold and Silver competitors ran in Group B, with the Pro field taking to the track in Group C. From this, the top 32 cars qualifed for Superpole, with the qualifying session setting the grid for 33rd downwards.

===== 24 Hours of Spa Superpole format =====
For 2026, the 24 Hours of Spa Superpole format was revamped with a new knockout format. 32 cars progressed to the Superpole session from qualifying, and competed in an initial 10-minute session. From this, the top 16 advanced into a seven-minute session, where the field was halved again, with the top eight then participating in another seven-minute session. Finally, the top four cars were each given a single flying lap to determine the pole sitter.

==== Practice session format ====
For 2026, Pre-Qualifying was replaced with Free Practice 2. The change aimed to remove many of the restrictions, such as those on refuelling, that came with the Pre-Qualifying session. At Endurance Cup rounds, both FP1 and FP2 ran for 90 minutes. Despite the name change, FP2 could still be used to set the grid if qualifying could not run. The stewards could also use the FP1 times if necessary.

== Season summary ==
=== Pre-season ===
The pre-season prologue for the GT World Challenge commenced on Wednesday, 8 April 2026, at Circuit Paul Ricard. In a series first, this testing event is held just days before the season-opening six-hour race scheduled for Saturday night. The opening day featured two sessions, with all 59 entered cars taking to the track. Thomas Preining claimed the fastest overall time of the day during the morning session, clocking a 1m54.682s in the No. 80 Lionspeed GP Porsche. He narrowly beat Christopher Haase in the No. 84 Eastalent Racing Audi by a margin of 0.086s. In the afternoon, Ben Dörr led the field in the No. 23 Team RJN McLaren with a time of 1m54.762s, which secured him the second-fastest spot across the combined daily standings. He was followed by Loek Hartog in the No. 97 Rutronik Racing Porsche. Despite several yellow flags and brief stoppages, no major incidents occurred. Haase topped the standings on the final day with a time of 1m54.352s, besting Preining's previous pace by three-tenths. Alessio Picariello followed in the No. 2 Boutsen VDS Porsche, trailing Haase by 0.283s, while Ricardo Feller and Robert Renauer secured third and fourth for Porsche. The session was marred by two Aston Martin crashes: Jamie Day sustained heavy front-end damage at Turn 7, and Mari Boya hit the barriers after losing control exiting Turn 2.

=== Opening rounds ===
The season opener at Circuit Paul Ricard opened with a multi-car collision involving the No. 10 Boutsen VDS Porsche and the No. 555 CSA Racing McLaren, immediately eliminating both from the race. Shortly after, the No. 59 Garage 59 McLaren was tipped into a spin and dropped to the back of the field, prompting the first safety car deployment. The No. 48 Mercedes-AMG Team Mann-Filter, having started from pole, then controlled the pace for much of the race. Near the end of the opening stint, the No. 7 Comtoyou Racing Aston Martin, driven by Marco Sørensen, suffered a puncture that forced an out-of-sequence pit stop. Two hours in, the No. 97 Rutronik Racing Porsche took over the Bronze Cup lead, where it would remain, ultimately placing 13th overall and first in class. As the final 60-minute stint began, the No. 48 Mercedes-AMG looked set for the win, but a late safety car for the stranded No. 93 Ziggo Sport Tempesta Porsche closed the field. This allowed Nicki Thiim in the No. 7 Aston Martin to erase a three-second gap to the leader. With nine minutes to go, a minor mistake from Lucas Auer opened the door for Thiim, who overtook for the win. The No. 7 Aston Martin prevailed, followed by the No. 48 Mercedes-AMG and the No. 58 Garage 59 McLaren, which also won the Gold Cup. Notably, the No. 32 Team WRT BMW surged from 10th to 4th, the No. 59 McLaren recovered to 5th, and the No. 9 Pure Rxcing Porsche clinched the Silver Cup win with a late move on the No. 30 Team WRT BMW.

The first race at Brands Hatch saw Arthur Leclerc and Thomas Neubauer take victory for AF Corse and Ferrari. Although the No. 50 Ferrari finished second on track, it was promoted after the leading No. 3 Mercedes-AMG of Verstappen Racing received two post-race penalties. The No. 80 Lionspeed GP Porsche initially dominated from pole position but retired following a mid-race stop due to steering issues. This allowed the No. 3 Mercedes-AMG to take the lead. Chris Lulham crossed the line first, but the penalties, incurred for pit stop and yellow flag infractions dropped the car out of the points. The race also featured an early 15-minute red flag after the No. 10 Porsche crashed on the opening lap. Ultimately, the No. 2 Boutsen VDS Porsche took second, while the No. 32 Team WRT BMW rounded out the podium. The No. 51 Ferrari took the win in the Gold Cup, while the Silver victory went the way of the No. 5 McLaren. In race two, the No. 80 Porsche would claim a lights-to-flag victory. Drivers Bastian Buus and Feller secured the win after the car ran flawlessly, redeeming a retirement from the opening race. The No. 3 Mercedes-AMG, driven by Dani Juncadella and Lulham, finished in second place, trailing the winners by just over three seconds. Winward Racing's Maro Engel and Auer took the final podium spot in the No. 48 Mercedes-AMG, successfully defending third despite receiving a five-second penalty for a pit infringement. Further down the field, Silver Cup victory went to the No. 30 Team WRT BMW, while the No. 555 McLaren secured Gold Cup honours.

The race at Monza began with an immediate multi-car crash at Turn 1. A spin by the No. 59 McLaren eliminated the top five grid starters, including the pole-sitting No. 64 HRT Ford Racing entry. Following the incident, the No. 17 Mercedes-AMG Team Getspeed led the field but was quickly handed a three-minute stop-go penalty for triggering the initial crash. This penalty handed the lead to the championship leading No. 48 Mercedes-AMG Team Mann-Filter car, which was embroiled in a close battle with the No. 2 Boutsen VDS Porsche. Mid-race strategy choices diverged during a safety car period, briefly giving the lead to the early-pitting No. 32 Team WRT BMW. With only 20 minutes remaining, two separate incidents, a crash and an engine failure, triggered a full-course yellow and a subsequent safety car. The interruption shuffled the running order once again, with the No. 66 Silver Cup Tresor Attempto Racing Audi emerging in the lead after successfully jumping past the No. 87 Winward Racing Mercedes-AMG in the final round of pit stops. At the final restart, the No. 87 Mercedes-AMG launched an immediate attack, but the Audi defended its lead through Turn 1. Moments later, contact between the No. 32 BMW and the No. 9 Porsche triggered a major accident, taking out the chasing No. 87 Mercedes-AMG and bringing out the final safety car to effectively end the race. This allowed the crew of the No. 66 Silver Cup Audi to claim a surprising overall victory after starting 29th on the grid. The No. 48 Mercedes-AMG finished second, with the No. 555 McLaren taking third. In Gold, the No. 71 Selected Car Racing Ferrari won, with Bronze Cup honours going the way of the No. 74 Kessel Racing Ferrari.

=== 24 Hours of Spa ===
At the 2026 24 Hours of Spa, the pole-winning No. 51 AF Corse Ferrari led early but dropped two laps back on Saturday evening due to a puncture and several penalties. This opened the door for multiple manufacturers, including Mercedes-AMG, Porsche, and BMW, all of whom led at various points. Disruptions from DNFs, Full-Course Yellows, Safety Cars, and a heavy midnight rain shower continuously reshuffled the order. Nevertheless, the No. 48 championship leading Mann-Filter Winward Mercedes-AMG maintained a consistent run, holding a slender advantage heading into Sunday morning. However, with 5.5 hours remaining, Preining executed an effective undercut pit stop, vaulting the No. 80 Lionspeed GP Porsche from third into a 20-second lead. Despite late interruptions, the Lionspeed GP crew held on to claim a historic overall victory after starting from the pitlane due to a Thursday engine change, becoming the first car in history to do so. The No. 48 Mercedes-AMG finished second, just ahead of the recovering No. 51 Ferrari. There was also high drama in the classes. In the Gold Cup, the No. 998 ROWE Racing BMW cruised to victory after the early-leading No. 58 Garage 59 McLaren suffered decisive Sunday morning setbacks. The Silver Cup featured a thrilling late-stage pass where David Perel in the No. 45 Rinaldi Racing Ferrari overtook the No. 30 Team WRT BMW for the win. Ferrari found further success in the Bronze Cup, where the No. 74 Kessel Racing entry won and secured an impressive 10th place overall finished. Finally, JMR clinched the Pro-Am victory, marking the first Corvette triumph at the event since 2009.

=== Mid-season rounds ===
Race one at Misano saw Charles Weerts launch his No. 32 BMW from fourth into the lead at the start, capitalising on a multi-car collision. The contact involved Valentino Rossi in the No. 46 BMW, Feller in the No. 80 Porsche, and Andrea Frassinetti in the No. 66 Audi. The spinning Audi caused Juncadella in the No. 3 Mercedes-AMG to crash out immediately, triggering a safety car. Following the restart, Weerts maintained his lead through the pit stops, handing the car to Kelvin van der Linde in first position. Rossi's car received a 10-second penalty for a jump start. Strong pit strategy moved the No. 80 Porsche to second ahead of the championship-leading Mercedes-AMG of Engel. A late full-course yellow for a stranded McLaren neutralised the race, effectively securing the race win for the No. 32 BMW. Class honours went to the No. 99 Audi in Gold, No. 30 BMW in Silver and No. 12 Mercedes-AMG in Bronze. For race two, race one retiree Jules Gounon, who drove for the absent Lulham, in the No. 3 Mercedes-AMG, would start from pole, closely defending against the previous winners in the No. 32 BMW. Van der Linde remained within one second during the entire first stint, while Max Hesse held third in the No. 46 BMW. During the pit window, a fast Team WRT pit stop allowed Weerts to jump into first position. The second stint saw Auer charging in the No. 48 Mercedes-AMG, setting the fastest lap and overtaking Rossi on the final lap to secure third place. Up front, Weerts would take the win ahead of Juncadella. In the classes, the No. 99 Audi took its second win of the weekend, with the No. 6 and No. 87 Mercedes-AMG taking respective class victories in Silver and Bronze.

In the first race at Magny-Cours, Gounon started from pole position and built a substantial cushion during his opening stint. Following the mandatory pit stops, his teammate Juncadella took over the leading No. 3 Mercedes-AMG car. A late-race full-course-yellow period neutralised the field, allowing Leclerc to consider challenging for the lead. However, Juncadella stabilised the gap to secure the overall victory for Mercedes-AMG Team Verstappen Racing. The AF Corse Ferrari of Leclerc and Neubauer finished second overall, while the Comtoyou Racing Aston Martin of Thiim and Kobe Pauwels completed the podium in third. The class victories were claimed by Boutsen VDS Porsche in the Gold Cup, Winward Racing Mercedes-AMG in the Bronze Cup, and Team WRT BMW in the Silver Cup. In the second race, pole-sitter Thiim was deemed out of position, earning a 10-second penalty. In the early stages, gaps between cars were erased when a severe accident involving Dustin Blattner triggered a red flag for barrier repairs. Following the safety car restart and a delayed pit window, Lionspeed GP executed an extremely fast pit stop. This allowed Feller and Buus to jump from fourth to first, with Buus piloting the No. 80 Porsche to the overall victory. Matisse Lismont secured second overall for Team WRT alongside the Silver Cup win, while Luca Engstler made a late-race pass to claim third for Rutronik Racing, delivering the new Lamborghini Temerario its first overall podium in GT World Challenge Europe. Further class victories went to the CSA McLaren in the Gold Cup and the Paradine Competition BMW in the Bronze Cup.

The race at the Nürburgring was dominated from start to finish by the No. 7 Comtoyou Racing Aston Martin. Starting from pole position, the driver trio of Thiim, Sørensen, and Mattia Drudi executed a flawless performance to claim a commanding overall victory. Behind them, Team WRT secured runner-up as their No. 32 BMW made steady progress through the field after starting eighth on the grid. Mercedes-AMG Team Verstappen Racing rounded out the overall podium in third place, capitalising on a ten-second time penalty given to the No. 59 Garage 59 McLaren, which crossed the finish line second but dropped to tenth. Further back, the championship-leading No. 48 Mercedes-AMG was forced to fight through a chaotic opening stint in the mid-pack as a result of a poor qualifying performance, ultimately finishing in fourth position. In the class battles, Tresor Attempto Racing secured the Gold Cup victory. Dylan Pereira made a decisive move to seize the class lead during the final hour of the race, eventually finishing seventh overall. The Silver Cup saw a historic breakthrough as HRT Ford Racing claimed the first-ever class victory for the Ford Mustang GT3. The crew, including debutant Niklas Kalus, executed a late-race overtake on the No. 30 Team WRT BMW, which had led most of the distance. Meanwhile, the Bronze Cup action saw the pole-sitting No. 222 2 Seas Motorsport Mercedes-AMG drop back at the start before fighting back to reclaim the lead in the final hour for the win.

=== Closing rounds ===
In race one at Zandvoort, Tom Fleming dived inside the pole-sitting Boutsen VDS Porsche of Morris Schuring at Gerlach to take the lead. Fleming held a slim gap until the pit stops, when heavy traffic nearly cost the No. 58 Garage 59 McLaren the lead. In the second stint, Louis Prette held off a close challenge from Dorian Boccolacci to secure the overall and Gold Cup victory. Behind them, Simon Birch defended third under intense pressure from Feller's Lionspeed GP Porsche. However, five minutes before the finish, Ben Green executed a double pass in his No. 69 Ferrari to overtake both cars and claim the final podium spot. Feller was later penalised after his teammate loosened his seatbelts on track. In the Silver Cup, another victory for the No. 30 Team WRT BMW of Lismont and Ignacio Montenegro secured the championship, while the No. 93 Ziggo Sport Tempesta Porsche took Bronze. In Sunday’s race two, a full-course yellow proved decisive. Konsta Lappalainen initially led an Emil Frey Racing Ferrari one-two, but teammate Green reacted fastest when the green flag waved. Green accelerated past Lappalainen and handed over to local driver Thierry Vermeulen, who secured the overall victory. Feller and Buus’s Porsche finished second. In the Gold Cup, AF Corse’s Ferrari won, while the No. 58 McLaren fell back after a contact penalty. In the Silver Cup, Oliver Söderström and Arthur Dorison took their first 2026 victory in the No. 21 Comtoyou Racing Aston Martin, finishing ahead of the Team WRT BMW. Finally, the No. 93 Porsche secured its second Bronze Cup victory of the weekend.

Rain heavily affected the first race of the closing Sprint Cup round in Barcelona. Buus, who started from pole, quickly fell down the order, citing incorrect tyre pressures for a poor opening stint. By contrast, Dennis Marschall’s Bronze Cup car showed strong pace, moving from seventh on the grid to the lead before a red flag halted the race due to worsening on-track conditions. With the Bronze and Silver Cup cars taking their mandatory pit stop under the red flag, the restart saw the Pro and Gold class cars largely outside the top ten. The remainder of the race saw higher-class cars carving their way into points-paying positions, with the No. 2 Boutsen VDS Porsche of Boccolacci most successful, leading until a penalty dropped them down the order. The No. 99 Gold Cup Audi was elevated to first place, leading over the line and taking overall victory. The No. 5 Optimum Motorsport McLaren took honours in Silver, while the No. 93 Porsche won the Bronze Cup. Race two ran in dry conditions. The No. 48 Mercedes-AMG initially took the lead but fell back, leading to a collision with another car and a 10-second time penalty. However, the No. 80 Lionspeed GP Porsche also suffered contact at the start of the race, dropping the car to the rear of the field, which was enough to secure the overall title for Engel and Auer. The No. 69 Emil Frey racing Ferrari of Green and Vermeulen dominated the race, resisting pressure from the No. 50 AF Corse Ferrari for most of the race. In the classes, VSR would claim the first class victory for the Lamborghini Temerario. However, points-paying positions for the No. 58 Garage 59 McLaren would see them clinch the title. Silver Cup honours went to the No. 66 Audi, while the No. 93 Porsche claimed their fourth consecutive Bronze Cup win.

The season’s final race began cleanly despite a massive entry of 61 cars, breaking the record for the largest grid outside the 24 Hours of Spa. The top ten cars ran within 10 seconds of each other for much of the opening stint. As teams and drivers settled into the race, overtaking picked up, with several drivers showcasing impressive skill in wheel-to-wheel action. However, the two pit-stop sequences proved decisive, with the overcut emerging as the strongest strategy for gaining positions. Most notably, after running behind two leading Porsches, the No. 17 Mercedes-AMG Team GetSpeed car emerged in the lead by a slim margin, a lead it maintained for the remainder of the race to take a commanding overall victory. The Lionspeed GP and Boutsen VDS Porsches completed the podium. Among the major headlines was Max Verstappen, who made his series debut in the No. 3 Mercedes-AMG. After overcoming an early penalty incurred by teammate Lulham, Verstappen moved from 24th overall to ninth when the chequered flag fell. In the Gold Cup, the No. 71 Selected Car Racing Ferrari took victory, while the No. 30 Team WRT BMW finished their dominant season with another win. In the Bronze Cup, the No. 222 Mercedes-AMG took victory, while a fifth-place finish for Dennis Marschall was enough to secure a second consecutive Bronze Cup title for the German driver.

== Results and standings ==
=== Race results ===
Rnd.		Circuit	Overall winners	Gold winners	Silver winners	Bronze winners
1		(France) Circuit Paul Ricard	(Belgium) No. 7 Comtoyou Racing	(United Kingdom) No. 58 Garage 59	(Lithuania) No. 9 Pure Rxcing	(Germany) No. 97 Rutronik Racing
1		(France) Circuit Paul Ricard	(San Marino) Mattia Drudi (Denmark) Marco Sørensen (Denmark) Nicki Thiim	(United Kingdom) Tom Fleming (Germany) Benjamin Goethe (Monaco) Louis Prette	(Austria) Max Hofer (United Kingdom) Alex Malykhin (Slovenia) Alexey Nesov	(Hong Kong) Antares Au (Italy) Loek Hartog (Germany) Riccardo Pera
2	R1	(United Kingdom) Brands Hatch	(Italy) No. 50 AF Corse	(Italy) No. 51 AF Corse	(United Kingdom) No. 5 Optimum Motorsport	Did not participate
2	R1	(United Kingdom) Brands Hatch	(Monaco) Arthur Leclerc (France) Thomas Neubauer	(Italy) Tommaso Mosca (Peru) Matias Zagazeta	(Portugal) Guilherme Oliveira (United Kingdom) Mikey Porter	Did not participate
2	R2	(United Kingdom) Brands Hatch	(Germany) No. 80 Lionspeed GP	(France) No. 555 CSA Racing	(Belgium) No. 30 Team WRT	Did not participate
2	R2	(United Kingdom) Brands Hatch	(Denmark) Bastian Buus (Switzerland) Ricardo Feller	(France) Romain Andriolo (France) Simon Gachet	(Belgium) Matisse Lismont (Argentina) Ignacio Montenegro	Did not participate
3		(Italy) Monza	(Germany) No. 66 Tresor Attempto Racing	(Denmark) No. 71 Selected Car Racing	(Germany) No. 66 Tresor Attempto Racing	(Switzerland) No. 74 Kessel Racing
3		(Italy) Monza	(Israel) Ariel Levi (Italy) Rocco Mazzola (Denmark) Sebastian Øgaard	(Denmark) Simon Birch (Denmark) Malte Ebdrup (Denmark) Frederik Schandorff	(Israel) Ariel Levi (Italy) Rocco Mazzola (Denmark) Sebastian Øgaard	(United States) Dustin Blattner (Germany) Dennis Marschall (Italy) Lorenzo Patrese
4		(Belgium) Spa	(Germany) No. 80 Lionspeed GP	(Germany) No. 998 ROWE Racing	(Germany) No. 45 Rinaldi Racing	(Switzerland) No. 74 Kessel Racing
4		(Belgium) Spa	(Denmark) Bastian Buus (Switzerland) Ricardo Feller (Austria) Thomas Preining	(Germany) Jens Klingmann (Germany) Tim Tramnitz (Belgium) Ugo de Wilde	(Italy) Alessandro Balzan (Spain) Rafael Durán (United States) Dylan Medler (South Africa) David Perel	(United States) Dustin Blattner (France) Mathys Jaubert (Germany) Dennis Marschall (United Kingdom) Ben Tuck
5	R1	(Italy) Misano	(Belgium) No. 32 Team WRT	(Germany) No. 99 Tresor Attempto Racing	(Belgium) No. 30 Team WRT	(United Arab Emirates) No. 12 GetSpeed Team Dubai
5	R1	(Italy) Misano	(South Africa) Kelvin van der Linde (Belgium) Charles Weerts	(Germany) Alex Aka (Luxembourg) Dylan Pereira	(Belgium) Matisse Lismont (Argentina) Ignacio Montenegro	(United Arab Emirates) Gabriel Rindone (Germany) Fabian Schiller
5	R2	(Italy) Misano	(Belgium) No. 32 Team WRT	(Germany) No. 99 Tresor Attempto Racing	(United States) No. 6 GetSpeed Team Bartone Bros	(United States) No. 87 Winward Racing
5	R2	(Italy) Misano	(South Africa) Kelvin van der Linde (Belgium) Charles Weerts	(Germany) Alex Aka (Luxembourg) Dylan Pereira	(United States) Anthony Bartone (France) Aurélien Panis	(Germany) Marvin Dienst (Russia) Rinat Salikhov
6	R1	(France) Magny-Cours	(Netherlands) No. 3 Mercedes-AMG Team Verstappen Racing	(Belgium) No. 10 Boutsen VDS	(Belgium) No. 30 Team WRT	(United States) No. 87 Winward Racing
6	R1	(France) Magny-Cours	(Andorra) Jules Gounon (Spain) Daniel Juncadella	(Sweden) Robin Knutsson (Belgium) Gilles Magnus	(Belgium) Matisse Lismont (Argentina) Ignacio Montenegro	(Germany) Marvin Dienst (Russia) Rinat Salikhov
6	R2	(France) Magny-Cours	(Germany) No. 80 Lionspeed GP	(France) No. 111 CSA Racing	(Belgium) No. 30 Team WRT	(United Kingdom) No. 991 Paradine Competition
6	R2	(France) Magny-Cours	(Denmark) Bastian Buus (Switzerland) Ricardo Feller	(United Kingdom) James Kell (France) Arthur Rougier	(Belgium) Matisse Lismont (Argentina) Ignacio Montenegro	(Brazil) Augusto Farfus (United Kingdom) Darren Leung
7		(Germany) Nürburgring	(Belgium) No. 7 Comtoyou Racing	(Germany) No. 99 Tresor Attempto Racing	(Germany) No. 65 HRT Ford Racing	(Bahrain) No. 222 2 Seas Motorsport
7		(Germany) Nürburgring	(San Marino) Mattia Drudi (Denmark) Marco Sørensen (Denmark) Nicki Thiim	(Germany) Alex Aka (Italy) Andrea Frassineti (Luxembourg) Dylan Pereira	(Belgium) Nicolas Baert (Philippines) Eduardo Coseteng (Germany) Niklas Kalus	(Republic of Ireland) Reece Barr (United Kingdom) Charles Dawson (United Kingdom) Kiern Jewiss
8	R1	(Netherlands) Zandvoort	(United Kingdom) No. 58 Garage 59	(United Kingdom) No. 58 Garage 59	(Belgium) No. 30 Team WRT	(United Kingdom) No. 93 Ziggo Sport Tempesta Racing
8	R1	(Netherlands) Zandvoort	(United Kingdom) Tom Fleming (Monaco) Louis Prette	(United Kingdom) Tom Fleming (Monaco) Louis Prette	(Belgium) Matisse Lismont (Argentina) Ignacio Montenegro	(Italy) Eddie Cheever III (Republic of Ireland) Peter Dempsey
8	R2	(Netherlands) Zandvoort	(Switzerland) No. 69 Emil Frey Racing	(Italy) No. 51 AF Corse	(Belgium) No. 21 Comtoyou Racing	(United Kingdom) No. 93 Ziggo Sport Tempesta Racing
8	R2	(Netherlands) Zandvoort	(United Kingdom) Ben Green (Netherlands) Thierry Vermeulen	(Italy) Tommaso Mosca (Peru) Matias Zagazeta	(France) Arthur Dorison (Sweden) Oliver Söderström	(Italy) Eddie Cheever III (Republic of Ireland) Peter Dempsey
9	R1	(Spain) Barcelona	(Germany) No. 99 Tresor Attempto Racing	(Germany) No. 99 Tresor Attempto Racing	(United Kingdom) No. 5 Optimum Motorsport	(United Kingdom) No. 93 Ziggo Sport Tempesta Racing
9	R1	(Spain) Barcelona	(Germany) Alex Aka (Luxembourg) Dylan Pereira	(Germany) Alex Aka (Luxembourg) Dylan Pereira	(Portugal) Guilherme Oliveira (United Kingdom) Mikey Porter	(Italy) Eddie Cheever III (Republic of Ireland) Peter Dempsey
9	R2	(Spain) Barcelona	(Switzerland) No. 69 Emil Frey Racing	(Italy) No. 163 VSR	(Germany) No. 66 Tresor Attempto Racing	(United Kingdom) No. 93 Ziggo Sport Tempesta Racing
9	R2	(Spain) Barcelona	(United Kingdom) Ben Green (Netherlands) Thierry Vermeulen	(Italy) Mattia Michelotto (Italy) Loris Spinelli	(Italy) Andrea Frassineti (Israel) Ariel Levi	(Italy) Eddie Cheever III (Republic of Ireland) Peter Dempsey
10		(Portugal) Portimão	(Germany) No. 17 Mercedes-AMG Team GetSpeed	(Denmark) No. 71 Selected Car Racing	(Belgium) No. 30 Team WRT	(Bahrain) No. 222 2 Seas Motorsport
10		(Portugal) Portimão	(Estonia) Ralf Aron (Germany) Maximilian Götz (Germany) Fabian Schiller	(Denmark) Simon Birch (Denmark) Malte Ebdrup (Denmark) Frederik Schandorff	(Belgium) Amaury Cordeel (Belgium) Matisse Lismont (Argentina) Ignacio Montenegro	(Republic of Ireland) Reece Barr (United Kingdom) Charles Dawson (United Kingdom) Kiern Jewiss

=== Scoring system ===
Championship points were awarded for the first ten positions in each race. The pole-sitter in each class also received one point, and entries were required to complete 75% of the winning car's race distance in order to be classified and earn points. Individual drivers were required to participate for a minimum of 25 minutes in order to earn championship points in any race. In the teams' standings, only the best-placed car for each team was classified.

Sprint Cup points

Position	1st	2nd	3rd	4th	5th	6th	7th	8th	9th	10th	Pole
Points	16.5	12	9.5	7.5	6	4.5	3	2	1	0.5	1

Monza, Nürburgring and Portimão points

Position	1st	2nd	3rd	4th	5th	6th	7th	8th	9th	10th	Pole
Points	25	18	15	12	10	8	6	4	2	1	1

Paul Ricard points

Position	1st	2nd	3rd	4th	5th	6th	7th	8th	9th	10th	Pole
Points	33	24	19	15	12	9	6	4	2	1	1

24 Hours of Spa points

Points are awarded after six hours, after twelve hours and at the finish.

Position	1st	2nd	3rd	4th	5th	6th	7th	8th	9th	10th	Pole
Points after 6hrs/12hrs	12	9	7	6	5	4	3	2	1	0	1
Points at the finish	25	18	15	12	10	8	6	4	2	1	1

=== Drivers' championship standings ===
Drivers competed for their respective GT World Challenge Powered by AWS championships which were split into Overall, Gold, Silver and Bronze titles.

==== Overall ====
Pos.	Drivers	Team	LEC (France)	BRH (United Kingdom)		MNZ (Italy)	SPA (Belgium)			MIS (Italy)		MAG (France)		NÜR (Germany)	ZAN (Netherlands)		BAR (Spain)		POR (Portugal)	Points
Pos.	Drivers	Team	LEC (France)	S1	S2	MNZ (Italy)	6hrs	12hrs	24hrs	S1	S2	S1	S2	NÜR (Germany)	S1	S2	S1	S2	POR (Portugal)	Points
1	(Austria) Lucas Auer (Germany) Maro Engel	(United States) Mercedes-AMG Team Mann-Filter	2^{P}			2	3	4	2					4					14	131.5
1	(Austria) Lucas Auer (Germany) Maro Engel	(United States) Winward Racing		6	3					3	3	4	19		13	8	7	11		131.5
2	(Denmark) Bastian Buus (Switzerland) Ricardo Feller	(Germany) Lionspeed GP	Ret	Ret^{P}	1^{P}	Ret	15	5	1	2	20	11	1	15	23	2	2^{P}	36	2	120
3	(South Africa) Kelvin van der Linde (Belgium) Charles Weerts	(Belgium) Team WRT	4	3	6	30	2	24	12	1	1	7	Ret	2	Ret	15	10	6	29	97
4	(Germany) Luca Stolz	(United States) Mercedes-AMG Team Mann-Filter	2^{P}			2	3	4	2					4					14	86
5	(Spain) Daniel Juncadella	(Netherlands) Mercedes-AMG Team Verstappen Racing	9	12	2	Ret	10	6	Ret	Ret	2^{P}	1^{P}	8	3	5	9	12	5		80
6	(Monaco) Arthur Leclerc	(Italy) AF Corse	19	1	15	11	22	12	5	9	6	2	4	40	6	5	Ret	2	10	76.5
7	(Denmark) Nicki Thiim	(Belgium) Comtoyou Racing	1	9	14	Ret	11	22	Ret	16	Ret	3	18^{P}	1^{P}	9	Ret	18	7	Ret	75.5
8	(France) Thomas Neubauer	(Italy) AF Corse		1	15					9	6	2	4		6	5	Ret	2		65.5
9	(France) Dorian Boccolacci	(Belgium) Boutsen VDS	11	2	12	4	7	15	8	27	18	9	12	12	2^{P}	11	6	Ret	3^{P}	65.5
10	(Netherlands) Morris Schuring	(Belgium) Boutsen VDS	11	2	12	4	7	15	8	27	18			12	2^{P}	11			3^{P}	60
11	(Denmark) Marco Sørensen	(Belgium) Comtoyou Racing	1			Ret	11	22	Ret					1^{P}						59
=	(San Marino) Mattia Drudi	(Belgium) Comtoyou Racing	1			Ret	11	22	Ret					1^{P}					Ret	59
12	(South Africa) Jordan Pepper	(Belgium) Team WRT	4	4	7	30	2	24	12	7	10	20	11	2	Ret	Ret	11	8	29	58
13	(Netherlands) Thierry Vermeulen	(Switzerland) Emil Frey Racing		10	11					4	5	15	Ret		3	1	Ret	1		56.5
13	(Netherlands) Thierry Vermeulen	(United Kingdom) JMW Motorsport												30						56.5
=	(United Kingdom) Ben Green	(Switzerland) Emil Frey Racing		10	11					4	5	15	Ret		3	1	Ret	1		56.5
=	(United Kingdom) Ben Green	(Malaysia) Johor Motorsports Racing JMR					51	38	29											56.5
14	(Andorra) Jules Gounon	(Netherlands) Mercedes-AMG Team Verstappen Racing	9			Ret	10	6	Ret	Ret	2^{P}	1^{P}	8	3						53.5
15	(United Kingdom) Tom Fleming (Monaco) Louis Prette	(United Kingdom) Garage 59	3	8	Ret	18	4	3	36	12	9	12	16	Ret	1	25	24	35	DSQ	51.5
16	(United Kingdom) Chris Lulham	(Netherlands) Mercedes-AMG Team Verstappen Racing	9	12	2	Ret	10	6	Ret					3	5	9	12	5	9	49.5
17	(Austria) Thomas Preining	(Germany) Lionspeed GP	Ret			Ret	15	5	1					15					2	48
18	(United Kingdom) Dean MacDonald	(United Kingdom) Garage 59	5	11	5	Ret	13	61†	Ret	13	7	5	7	10	20	13	4	9	6	47.5
19	(Germany) Max Hesse (Italy) Valentino Rossi	(Belgium) Team WRT	12	14	4	Ret	9	8	6	6^{P}	4	6	9	9	12	4	16	38	49	46.5
20	(Germany) Fabian Schiller	(Germany) Mercedes-AMG Team GetSpeed	7			Ret	62†	62†	17					5					1	41
20	(Germany) Fabian Schiller	(United Arab Emirates) GetSpeed Team Dubai								21	36	36	32		34	40	32	31		41
=	(Germany) Maximilian Götz	(Germany) Mercedes-AMG Team GetSpeed	7			Ret	62†	62†	17					5					1	41
21	(Belgium) Alessio Picariello	(Belgium) Boutsen VDS	11			4	7	15	8			9	12	12					3^{P}	36
22	(Israel) Ariel Levi	(Germany) Tresor Attempto Racing	21	22	31	1	67†	67†	Ret	Ret	DNS	16	21	37	15	22	Ret	3	15	34.5
23	(Germany) Benjamin Goethe	(United Kingdom) Garage 59	3			18	4	3	36					Ret					DSQ	32
24	(Luxembourg) Dylan Pereira	(Germany) Tresor Attempto Racing	Ret	Ret	Ret	Ret	65†	65†	Ret	5	8	14	37	7	14	14	1	10	30	31
=	(Germany) Alex Aka	(Germany) Tresor Attempto Racing	Ret	Ret	Ret		65†	65†	Ret	5	8	14	37	7	14	14	1	10	30	31
25	(Germany) Marvin Kirchhöfer	(United Kingdom) Garage 59	5	11	5	Ret	13	61†	Ret	13	7	5	7	10	20	13				31
26	(United Kingdom) Joseph Loake	(United Kingdom) Garage 59	5			Ret	13	61†	Ret					10			4	9	6	29.5
27	(Italy) Tommaso Mosca	(Italy) AF Corse	14	7	19	Ret	35	23	3^{P}	15	14	10	10	29	7	6	30	17	11	29
28	(Germany) Luca Engstler (Switzerland) Patric Niederhauser	(Germany) Rutronik Racing	Ret	20	18	7	18	18	19	11	26	41	3	19	22	7	3	Ret	50	28
29	(Belgium) Matisse Lismont (Argentina) Ignacio Montenegro	(Belgium) Team WRT	18	15	8	17	24	20	15	10	17	13	2	14	8	16	33	Ret	5	27.5
30	(Belgium) Amaury Cordeel	(Belgium) Team WRT	18	4	7	17	24	20	15	7	10	20	11	14	Ret	Ret	11	8	5	26
31	(Brazil) Augusto Farfus	(Germany) ROWE Racing	6			5	5	21	9					38						26
31	(Brazil) Augusto Farfus	(United Kingdom) Paradine Competition								25	38	31	23		18	35	20	29		26
=	(United Kingdom) Jake Dennis	(Germany) ROWE Racing	6			5	5	21	9					38					21	26
=	(Switzerland) Raffaele Marciello	(Germany) ROWE Racing	6			5	5	21	9					38						26
32	(Italy) Rocco Mazzola	(Germany) Tresor Attempto Racing	21			1	67†	67†	Ret					37					15	25
=	(Denmark) Sebastian Øgaard	(Germany) Tresor Attempto Racing	21			1	67†	67†	Ret	39	37	39	33	37	38	36	38	34	15	25
33	(Germany) Christopher Haase (Austria) Simon Reicher	(Austria) Eastalent Racing	15	23	17	20	1	51	Ret	8	35	Ret	5	Ret	21	Ret	14	14	Ret	20
34	(Germany) Dennis Marschall	(Switzerland) Kessel Racing	28			8	14	1	10	24	34	23	Ret	26	37	27	9	21	33	18
35	(Italy) Matteo Cairoli	(Switzerland) Emil Frey Racing		5	9					22	Ret	28	17		16	3	Ret	13		17.5
=	(Finland) Konsta Lappalainen	(Switzerland) Emil Frey Racing		5	9					22	Ret	28	17		16	3	Ret	13		17.5
=	(Finland) Konsta Lappalainen	(United Kingdom) JMW Motorsport												30					17	17.5
36	(United States) Dustin Blattner	(Switzerland) Kessel Racing	28			8	14	1	10	24	34	23	Ret		37	27			33	17
37	(Belgium) Kobe Pauwels	(Belgium) Comtoyou Racing	20	9	14	27	28	59†	Ret	16	Ret	3	18^{P}	24	9	Ret	18	7	32	16.5
38	(Denmark) Nicklas Nielsen (Italy) Alessio Rovera	(Italy) AF Corse	14			Ret	35	23	3^{P}					29						16
39	(Belgium) Maxime Martin	(Germany) Mercedes-AMG Team GetSpeed	7			Ret	62†	62†	17					5						16
40	(France) Thomas Drouet (India) Arjun Maini (Switzerland) Fabio Scherer	(Germany) HRT Ford Racing	25			Ret^{P}	6	7	Ret					6					16	16
41	(Italy) Andrea Frassineti	(Germany) Tresor Attempto Racing	Ret	22	31	Ret	65†	65†	Ret	Ret	DNS	16	21	7	15	22	Ret	3	30	15.5
42	(France) Romain Andriolo	(France) CSA Racing	Ret	27	10	3	45	33	40	41	11	30	14	Ret	Ret	24	13	16		15.5
43	(Belgium) Lorens Lecertua	(France) CSA Racing	Ret			3	45	33	40											15
43	(Belgium) Lorens Lecertua	(France) Saintéloc Racing												Ret						15
=	(Belgium) Baptiste Moulin	(France) CSA Racing	Ret			3	45	33	40											15
44	(Peru) Matías Zagazeta	(Italy) AF Corse	31	7	19	Ret	26	13	16	15	14	10	10	32	7	6	30	17	28	13
45	(United Kingdom) Dan Harper	(Belgium) Team WRT	12			Ret	9	8	6					9						13
46	(France) Mathys Jaubert (United Kingdom) Ben Tuck	(Switzerland) Kessel Racing					14	1	10											13
47	(Denmark) Simon Birch	(Denmark) Selected Car Racing	16			14	16	42	26					11					4	12
47	(Denmark) Simon Birch	(Austria) Razoon – more than racing		30	28										4	18				12
=	(Australia) Matt Campbell (Turkey) Ayhancan Güven (France) Frédéric Makowiecki	(France) Schumacher CLRT					12	17	4											12
=	(Denmark) Malte Ebdrup (Denmark) Frederik Schandorff	(Denmark) Selected Car Racing	16			14	16	42	26					11					4	12
48	(Germany) Markus Winkelhock	(Austria) Eastalent Racing	15			20	1	51	Ret					Ret					Ret	12
49	(France) Lilou Wadoux	(Italy) AF Corse	19			11	22	12	5					40					10	11
50	(United Kingdom) David Pittard	(Netherlands) KPX Motorsport		29	24					30	25	26	31		30	37	8	Ret		11
50	(United Kingdom) David Pittard	(United Kingdom) Paradine Competition					19	2	13											11
51	(Indonesia) Sean Gelael	(Italy) AF Corse	19			11	22	12	5					40						10
52	(Germany) Jens Klingmann (Germany) Tim Tramnitz (Belgium) Ugo de Wilde	(Germany) ROWE Racing	10			23	8	10	11					17					7	9
53	(United Kingdom) James Kellett	(United Kingdom) Paradine Competition	23			16	19	2	13					36					31	9
=	(South Africa) Leyton Fourie	(United Kingdom) Paradine Competition					19	2	13											9
=	(United Kingdom) Darren Leung	(United Kingdom) Paradine Competition	23			16	19	2	13	25	38	31	23	36	18	35	20	29	31	9
54	(Italy) Mattia Michelotto (Italy) Loris Spinelli	(Italy) VSR		28	23					36	12	22	Ret		10	17	15	4		8.5
55	(France) Arthur Rougier	(France) CSA Racing	8	21	25	33	21	14	34	18	15	19	6	27	28	30	22	37		8.5
=	(United Kingdom) James Kell	(France) CSA Racing	8	21	25	33	21	14	34	18	15	19	6	27	28	30	22	37	39	8.5
56	(Germany) Ben Dörr (United Kingdom) Horatio Fitz-Simon (United Kingdom) Max Lynn	(United Kingdom) Team RJN	32			6	59	50	35					39					23	8
57	(Portugal) Henrique Chaves (Norway) Christian Krognes	(Germany) natural elements by Walkenhorst Motorsport	WD			28	32	9	7					16					12	7
=	(United Arab Emirates) Jamie Day	(Germany) natural elements by Walkenhorst Motorsport	WD			28	32	9	7					16					12	7
=	(United Arab Emirates) Jamie Day	(Germany) Walkenhorst Motorsport		16	20					14	16	24	26		29	19	26	15		7
58	(Sweden) Robin Knutsson (Belgium) Gilles Magnus	(Belgium) Boutsen VDS	Ret	Ret	DNS	Ret	17	16	22	17	19	8	24	8	11	10	19	28	Ret	7
59	(Republic of Ireland) Peter Dempsey	(Italy) AF Corse					66†	66†	Ret											6
59	(Republic of Ireland) Peter Dempsey	(United Kingdom) Ziggo Sport Tempesta Racing								35	30	18	28	31	17	21	5	20		6
=	(Italy) Eddie Cheever III	(United Kingdom) Ziggo Sport Tempesta Racing	49†			15	20	57†	Ret	35	30	18	28	31	17	21	5	20	Ret	6
60	(Italy) Marco Mapelli	(Germany) Rutronik Racing	Ret			7	18	18	19					19					50	6
61	(Germany) Sven Müller	(Germany) Rutronik Racing				38†	29	25	43					Ret						4.5
61	(Germany) Sven Müller	(Belgium) Boutsen VDS															6	Ret		4.5
62	(France) Simon Gachet	(France) CSA Racing	8	27	10	33	21	14	34	41	11	30	14	27	Ret	24	13	16	39	4.5
63	(Germany) Nico Menzel	(Belgium) Boutsen VDS												8						4
=	(France) César Gazeau	(United States) GetSpeed Team BartoneBros	33			13	33	26	28					20					8	4
=	(United States) Anthony Bartone (France) Aurélien Panis	(United States) GetSpeed Team BartoneBros	33	17	29	13	33	26	28	19	13	25	20	20	36	26	34	22	8	4
=	(Italy) Lorenzo Patrese	(Switzerland) Kessel Racing	28			8								26					33	4
64	(Netherlands) Jop Rappange	(Netherlands) KPX Motorsport		29	24					30	25	26	31		30	37	8	Ret	35	2
64	(Netherlands) Jop Rappange	(United Kingdom) Paradine Competition					69†	69†	Ret											2
65	(United Kingdom) Jonny Adam (Italy) Giacomo Petrobelli	(United Kingdom) Ecurie Ecosse Blackthorn	41			9	27	41	31											2
=	(United Kingdom) Lorcan Hanafin	(United Kingdom) Ecurie Ecosse Blackthorn				9	27	41	31											2
67	(Italy) Francesco Simonazzi (United Kingdom) Angus Whiteside	(Italy) Dinamic GT	37			10	48	35	25					43					Ret	1
=	(Thailand) Tanart Sathienthirakul	(Italy) Dinamic GT	37	31	30	10	48	35	25	33	29	37	22	43	33	32	27	27	Ret	1
Not classified
–	(Estonia) Ralf Aron	(Germany) Mercedes-AMG Team GetSpeed																	1	0
–	(Austria) Klaus Bachler	(Austria) Razoon – more than racing													4	18				0
–	(Austria) Klaus Bachler	(Denmark) High Class Racing																	Ret	0
–	(United Kingdom) Jack Hawksworth	(United Kingdom) Garage 59																	6	0
–	(United Arab Emirates) Constantin Dressler	(Switzerland) Kessel Racing												26			9	21		0
–	(United Kingdom) Ben Barnicoat (Netherlands) Max Verstappen	(Netherlands) Mercedes-AMG Team Verstappen Racing																	9	0
–	(Spain) Albert Costa	(Italy) AF Corse																	10	0
–	(Portugal) Guilherme Oliveira (United Kingdom) Mikey Porter	(United Kingdom) Optimum Motorsport	Ret	13	13	Ret	30	11	17	29	33	42	13	Ret	25	29	21	18	19	0
–	(Netherlands) Dante Rappange	(United Kingdom) Optimum Motorsport	Ret			Ret	30	11	17					Ret					19	0
–	(Germany) Salman Owega	(United Kingdom) Optimum Motorsport					30	11	17											0
–	(Italy) Lorenzo Ferrari	(Germany) Tresor Attempto Racing				Ret														0
–	(Italy) Lorenzo Ferrari	(Italy) AF Corse																	11	0
–	(Italy) Nicola Lacorte	(Italy) AF Corse																	11	0
–	(Oman) Ahmad Al Harthy (Spain) Javier Sagrera (Australia) Calan Williams	Oman Racing by Century Motorsport	29			12	55	48	Ret					33					26	0
–	(Sweden) Oliver Söderström	(Belgium) Comtoyou Racing	20	24	27	27	28	59†	Ret	28	27	27	15	24	19	12	29	19	32	0
–	(France) Arthur Dorison	(Belgium) Comtoyou Racing		24	27		28	59†	Ret	28	27	27	15		19	12	29	19		0
–	(Belgium) Jef Machiels (Belgium) Gilles Stadsbader	(Italy) AF Corse	31	25	16	Ret	26	13	16	20	21	Ret	34	32	32	20	23	12	28	0
–	(Hong Kong) Antares Au	(Germany) Rutronik Racing	13			38†	29	25	43					Ret						0
–	(Italy) Riccardo Pera	(Germany) Rutronik Racing	13			38†								Ret						0
–	(Italy) Riccardo Pera	(Lithuania) Pure Rxcing								34	28				39	33				0
–	(Netherlands) Loek Hartog	(Germany) Rutronik Racing	13																	0
–	(Italy) Francesco Braschi	(Italy) AF Corse					26	13	16											0
–	(Belgium) Nicolas Baert	(Belgium) Comtoyou Racing					43	43	Ret											0
–	(Belgium) Nicolas Baert	(Germany) HRT Ford Racing												13					20	0
–	(Belgium) Nicolas Baert	(Germany) Lionspeed GP													27	Ret	25	24		0
–	(Philippines) Eduardo Coseteng	(Germany) HRT Ford Racing	26			Ret	37	19	18					13					20	0
–	(Germany) Niklas Kalus	(Germany) HRT Ford Racing												13						0
–	(United Kingdom) Charles Dawson (United Kingdom) Kiern Jewiss	(Bahrain) 2 Seas Motorsport	27			41†	38	30	27	26	31	21	25	23	26	23	35	30	13	0
–	(Republic of Ireland) Reece Barr	(Bahrain) 2 Seas Motorsport	27			41†	38	30	27					23					13	0
–	(France) Jim Pla	(France) CSA Racing					21	14	34										39	0
–	(France) Jim Pla	(France) Saintéloc Racing										38	Ret							0
–	(United States) Dylan Medler (South Africa) David Perel	(Germany) Rinaldi Racing	42			19	42	29	14					Ret					41	0
–	(Spain) Rafael Duran	(Germany) Rinaldi Racing	42			19	42	29	14					Ret						0
–	(Italy) Alessandro Balzan	(Germany) Rinaldi Racing					42	29	14											0
–	(Ecuador) Mateo Villagomez	(Germany) Walkenhorst Motorsport	34	16	20	24	68†	68†	Ret	14	16	24	26	41	29	19	26	15	45	0
–	(United Kingdom) Chris Froggatt	(United Kingdom) Ziggo Sport Tempesta Racing	49†			15	20	57†	Ret					31					Ret	0
–	(Hong Kong) Jonathan Hui	(United Kingdom) Ziggo Sport Tempesta Racing				15	20	57†	Ret											0
–	(United Arab Emirates) Mathieu Detry	(Belgium) Team WRT					24	20	15											0
–	(Netherlands) Robert De Haan	(United Kingdom) Paradine Competition	24			16													31	0
–	(Denmark) Conrad Laursen	(Denmark) Selected Car Racing					16	42	26											0
–	(France) Alessandro Ghiretti	(Belgium) Boutsen VDS	Ret			Ret	17	16	22										Ret	0
–	(Slovenia) Alexey Nesov	(Lithuania) Pure Rxcing	17	19	21	37†	31	58†	Ret											0
–	(Slovenia) Alexey Nesov	(Germany) Tresor Attempto Racing																	36	0
–	(United Kingdom) Alex Malykhin	(Lithuania) Pure Rxcing	17	19	21	37†	31	58†	Ret	34	28	35	Ret	22	39	33	Ret	Ret	Ret	0
–	(Austria) Max Hofer	(Lithuania) Pure Rxcing	17			37†	31	58†	Ret					22					Ret	0
–	(Germany) Marvin Dienst (Russia) Rinat Salikhov	(United States) Winward Racing	22			35†	40	31	21	23	24	17	36	25	24	34	17	23	18	0
–	(San Marino) Giacomo Altoè (United Kingdom) Casper Stevenson	(United Kingdom) JMW Motorsport																	17	0
–	(France) Gaspard Simon	(Germany) Walkenhorst Motorsport	34	18	26	24	68†	68†	Ret	31	22	29	29	41	31	31	Ret	25		0
–	(France) Maxime Robin	(Germany) Walkenhorst Motorsport		18	26		68†	68†	Ret	31	22	29	29		31	31	Ret	25		0
–	(Netherlands) Maxime Oosten	(Germany) HRT Ford Racing	26			Ret	37	19	18										20	0
–	(Germany) Finn Wiebelhaus	(Germany) HRT Ford Racing	26			Ret	37	19	18											0
–	(Germany) Max Reis	(Germany) HRT Ford Racing					37	19	18											0
–	(Italy) Mirko Bortolotti (France) Franck Perera	(Austria) TGI Team by GRT	39			Ret	60	60†	Ret					18					51	0
–	(United Kingdom) Sandy Mitchell	(Austria) TGI Team by GRT												18						0
–	(Italy) Gabriele Piana	(United States) Winward Racing	22			35†	40	31	21					25					18	0
–	(France) Sébastien Baud	(Belgium) Comtoyou Racing	20			27	28	59†	Ret					24					32	0
–	(Netherlands) Mex Jansen	(United Kingdom) Ziggo Sport Tempesta Racing					20	57†	Ret											0
–	(Switzerland) Alex Fontana (Germany) Patrick Kolb (United Arab Emirates) Bashar Mardini	(Germany) Lionspeed GP	Ret			21	41	27	20					44					46	0
–	(Zimbabwe) Axcil Jefferies	(Germany) Lionspeed GP					41	27	20											0
–	(Zimbabwe) Axcil Jefferies	(Germany) Rinaldi Racing																	41	0
–	(Netherlands) Daan Arrow	(United States) Winward Racing					40	31	21											0
–	(United Arab Emirates) Gabriel Rindone	(United Arab Emirates) GetSpeed Team Dubai	36			31	23	28	47	21	36	36	32	Ret	34	40	32	31	40	0
–	(Denmark) Dennis Lind	(United Kingdom) Steller Motorsport	38			26	58	45	41					21					48	0
–	(France) Antoine Doquin	(United Kingdom) Steller Motorsport	38			26	58	45	41					21						0
–	(Denmark) Mikkel Mac	(United Kingdom) Steller Motorsport				26								21					48	0
–	(Austria) Philipp Eng (Germany) Marco Wittmann	(Germany) ROWE Racing																	21	0
–	(Switzerland) Felix Hirsiger	(Italy) AF Corse		26	22					32	23	32	30		Ret	28	28	26		0
–	(Thailand) Carl Bennet	(Italy) AF Corse		26	22					32	23	32	30		Ret	28	28	26		0
–	(Thailand) Carl Bennet	(Austria) Razoon – more than racing					56	54	42											0
–	(Germany) Tim Heinemann	(United Kingdom) JMW Motorsport	Ret			22	36	55†	Ret					30						0
–	(Switzerland) Rolf Ineichen	(United Kingdom) JMW Motorsport	Ret			22	36	55†	Ret											0
–	(Germany) Thomas Kiefer	(United Kingdom) JMW Motorsport				22	36	55†	Ret											0
–	(Slovenia) Mark Kastelic	(Germany) Tresor Attempto Racing					67†	67†	Ret											0
–	(Slovenia) Mark Kastelic	(Italy) Dinamic GT								33	29	37	22		33	32	27	27		0
–	(Slovenia) Mark Kastelic	(Germany) Walkenhorst Motorsport																	45	0
–	(Denmark) Mikkel O. Pedersen	(Lithuania) Pure Rxcing										35	Ret	22			Ret	Ret	Ret	0
–	(United Kingdom) Aaron Walker	(Bahrain) 2 Seas Motorsport					61	53	44											0
–	(United Kingdom) Aaron Walker	(Germany) Team Motopark																	22	0
–	(Argentina) Marcos Siebert	(Germany) Team Motopark																	22	0
–	(Australia) Christian Mansell	(Germany) Team Motopark					44	36	23										22	0
–	(Belgium) Dries Vanthoor	(United Kingdom) Paradine Competition	23											36						0
–	(Canada) Mikaël Grenier	(United Arab Emirates) GetSpeed Team Dubai	36			31	23	28	47										40	0
–	(Germany) Tom Kalender	(United Arab Emirates) GetSpeed Team Dubai	36			31	23	28	47					Ret					40	0
–	(South Africa) Jarrod Waberski	(United Arab Emirates) GetSpeed Team Dubai					23	28	47											0
–	(Angola) Rui Andrade (Switzerland) Yannik Mettler (Hungary) Levente Révész	(Germany) Team Motopark					44	36	23											0
–	(Brazil) Christian Hahn	(United Kingdom) Paradine Competition	24			34	69†	69†	Ret					34					25	0
–	(United Kingdom) Ashley Sutton	(United Kingdom) Paradine Competition	24																	0
–	(Switzerland) Ethan Ischer	(Germany) Walkenhorst Motorsport	34			24	68†	68†	Ret					41						0
–	(United Kingdom) Harry George (United Kingdom) Adam Smalley (United Kingdom) Freddie Tomlinson	(United Kingdom) Optimum Motorsport	45			Ret	47	37	24					28					27	0
–	(Netherlands) Ruben Del Sarte	(United Kingdom) Optimum Motorsport					47	37	24											0
–	(Sweden) Gustav Bergström	(Germany) Lionspeed GP															25	24		0
–	(France) Etienne Cheli (Argentina) Ezequiel Pérez Companc	(France) Saintéloc Racing	30			36†	25	40	30					Ret					24	0
–	(Ukraine) Ivan Klymenko	(France) Saintéloc Racing	30			36†	25	40	30										24	0
–	(Germany) Ralf Bohn (Netherlands) Huub van Eijndhoven	(Germany) Herberth Motorsport	35			25	39	32	46					35					37	0
–	(Germany) Robert Renauer	(Germany) Herberth Motorsport	35			25								35					37	0
–	(Switzerland) Lucas Legeret	(France) Saintéloc Racing					25	40	30											0
–	(Switzerland) Lucas Legeret	(Germany) Walkenhorst Motorsport																	45	0
–	(Denmark) Michelle Gatting (Estonia) Martin Rump	(Germany) Rutronik Racing					29	25	43											0
–	(France) Loris Cabirou	(Italy) Dinamic GT		31	30		48	35	25	38	32	34	27		35	39	31	33		0
–	(France) Loris Cabirou	(France) CSA Racing																	34	0
–	(United Kingdom) Daryl De Leon	(United Kingdom) Paradine Competition																	25	0
–	(United Kingdom) Josh Rowledge	(United Kingdom) Paradine Competition				34	69†	69†	Ret					34					25	0
–	(Poland) Karol Basz	(United States) GetSpeed Team BartoneBros					33	26	28											0
–	(France) Romain Leroux	(United Kingdom) Ecurie Ecosse Blackthorn					27	41	31											0
–	(Australia) Garnet Patterson	(Bahrain) 2 Seas Motorsport					38	30	27											0
–	(Russia) Dmitry Gvazava	(Italy) Dinamic GT								38	32	34	27		35	39	31	33		0
–	(Netherlands) Flynt Schuring	(Germany) Lionspeed GP													27	Ret				0
–	(Norway) Magnus Gustavsen	(Austria) Razoon – more than racing		30	28															0
–	(Austria) Gerhard Tweraser	(Austria) Razoon – more than racing	40																	0
–	(Austria) Gerhard Tweraser	(Germany) Tresor Attempto Racing				29								42						0
–	(Italy) Daniele Di Amato	(Germany) Tresor Attempto Racing	43			29	54	56†	Ret					42					36	0
–	(Germany) Carrie Schreiner	(Germany) Tresor Attempto Racing	43			29	54	56†	Ret	39	37	39	33	42	38	36	38	34	36	0
–	(Malaysia) Prince Abu Bakar Ibrahim (Malaysia) H.H. Prince Jefri Ibrahim (Australia) Jordan Love	(Malaysia) Johor Motorsports Racing JMR					51	38	29											0
–	(Italy) Enzo Trulli	(Lithuania) Pure Rxcing					31	58†	Ret											0
–	(Netherlands) Colin Caresani (Mexico) Alfredo Hernández (France) Stéphane Tribaudini	(Mexico) Grupo Prom Racing Team	47			32	63†	63†	Ret					46						0
–	(France) Mathieu Jaminet (Germany) Alfred Renauer	(Germany) Herberth Motorsport					39	32	46											0
–	(Denmark) Anders Fjordbach (China) Kerong Li (China) Hongli Ye (China) Bo Yuan	(Denmark) High Class Racing					46	39	32											0
–	(Brazil) Marcelo Tomasoni	(Belgium) Comtoyou Racing	44			39†	52	44	Ret	40	40	40	38	45	Ret	Ret	36	32	38	0
–	(Italy) Felice Jelmini	(Belgium) Comtoyou Racing					52	44	Ret	40	40	40	38		Ret	Ret	36	32		0
–	(India) Sai Sanjay	(France) CSA Racing					45	33	40											0
–	(Belgium) Benjamin Paque	(Austria) Razoon – more than racing	40																	0
–	(Belgium) Benjamin Paque	(Germany) GetSpeed Team PCX					50	34	33											0
–	(France) Jordan Boisson (France) Patrick Charlaix (France) Marvin Klein	(Germany) GetSpeed Team PCX					50	34	33										42	0
–	(Italy) David Fumanelli (Monaco) Marco Pulcini	(Switzerland) Kessel Racing								37	39	33	35		40	38	37	WD		0
–	(United Kingdom) Bobby Thompson	(United Kingdom) Paradine Competition				34								34						0
–	(Australia) Jayden Kelly (United Kingdom) Josh Rattican (Spain) Tommy Pintos	(United Kingdom) Greystone GT	Ret			42†	34	52	37					Ret					Ret	0
–	(United Kingdom) Zac Meakin	(United Kingdom) Greystone GT					34	52	37											0
–	(France) Jean-Baptiste Simmenauer (United Kingdom) James Higgins	(France) CSA Racing												Ret					34	0
–	(United States) Wyatt Brichacek	(United Kingdom) Team RJN					59	50	35											0
–	(Netherlands) Yelmer Buurman (Netherlands) Nigel Schoonderwoerd	(Netherlands) KPX Motorsport																	35	0
–	(France) Pierre-Louis Chovet	(United Kingdom) JMW Motorsport					36	55†	Ret											0
–	(Spain) Lorenzo Fluxá Cross	(United Kingdom) Steller Motorsport	38																	0
–	(Italy) Fabio Babini (Japan) Hiroshi Hamaguchi (Germany) Nico Menzel (Italy) Johannes Zelger	(San Marino) Tsunami RT					53	47	38											0
–	(France) Michael Blanchermain	(France) Saintéloc Racing										38	Ret							0
–	(United States) Aaron Muss	(Belgium) Comtoyou Racing	44			39†	52	44	Ret					45					38	0
–	(France) Valentin Hasse-Clot	(Belgium) Comtoyou Racing																	38	0
–	(Germany) Maximilian Paul	(Austria) TGI Team by GRT	39			Ret	60	60†	Ret										51	0
–	(Canada) Kyle Marcelli	(Belgium) Comtoyou Racing	44			39†	52	44	Ret											0
–	(Switzerland) Nicolò Rosi (Italy) Niccolò Schirò	(Germany) Car Collection Motorsport					49	46	39											0
–	(Canada) Reinhold Krahn (Germany) Joel Sturm	(Germany) Car Collection Motorsport					49	46	39										44	0
–	(Austria) Dominik Olbert	(Austria) Razoon – more than racing	40																	0
–	(Greece) Stylianos Kolovos	(Austria) Razoon – more than racing				40†														0
–	(Germany) Lenny Ried	(Austria) Razoon – more than racing				40†														0
–	(Germany) Lenny Ried	(United Kingdom) Steller Motorsport					58	45	41											0
–	(Greece) Georgios Kolovos	(Austria) Razoon – more than racing				40†														0
–	(Greece) Georgios Kolovos	(Germany) Tresor Attempto Racing					54	56†	Ret											0
–	(United Kingdom) Tom Wood	(United Kingdom) Ecurie Ecosse Blackthorn	41																	0
–	(Denmark) Mikkel Gaarde Pedersen	(United Kingdom) Steller Motorsport					58	45	41											0
–	(United Kingdom) Kenzie Reiss Beecroft (Australia) Bryce Fullwood (United Kingdom) Edward McDermott	(Austria) Razoon – more than racing					56	54	42											0
–	(Italy) Alberto Di Folco	(Germany) Tresor Attempto Racing	43																	0
–	(Belgium) Sarah Bovy (Belgium) Xavier Knauf (Belgium) Grégory Servais	(Belgium) Comtoyou Racing					43	43	Ret											0
–	(Germany) Max Mutschlechner (Austria) Leo Pichler (Austria) Richard Wolf	(Austria) Razoon – more than racing																	43	0
–	(United States) Jason Hart (United States) Scott Noble	(United States) GetSpeed Team Noble Racing	46																	0
–	(United States) Jason Hart (United States) Scott Noble	(Bahrain) 2 Seas Motorsport					61	53	44											0
–	(United Kingdom) Lewis Williamson	(Bahrain) 2 Seas Motorsport					61	53	44											0
–	(Italy) Pietro Armanni	(Germany) Car Collection Motorsport																	44	0
–	(Belgium) Armand Fumal (Australia) Bayley Hall (Australia) Andres Latorre (Germany) Tobias Müller	(Belgium) Muehlner Motorsport					57	49	45											0
–	(Brazil) Sérgio Sette Câmara	(Germany) Tresor Attempto Racing					54	56†	Ret											0
–	(Brazil) Sérgio Sette Câmara	(Belgium) Comtoyou Racing												45						0
–	(United Kingdom) Philip Ellis	(United States) GetSpeed Team Noble Racing	46																	0
–	(United Kingdom) Philip Ellis	(Germany) Team Motopark																	Ret	0
–	(Brazil) Marcos Gomes (Brazil) Alan Hellmeister (Brazil) Sebastião Malucelli	(Austria) Razoon – more than racing																	47	0
–	(Denmark) Kasper H. Jensen	(United Kingdom) Steller Motorsport																	48	0
–	(United States) Neil Verhagen	(Belgium) Team WRT																	49	0
–	(Spain) Mari Boya (Spain) Roberto Merhi (Canada) Lance Stroll	(Belgium) Comtoyou Racing	48†																	0
–	(Brazil) Pedro Ebrahim	Oman Racing by Century Motorsport					55	48	Ret											0
–	(Italy) Stefano Costantini	(United Kingdom) Ziggo Sport Tempesta Racing	49†																	0
–	(United Kingdom) Adam Christodoulou	(Mexico) Grupo Prom Racing Team					63†	63†	Ret											0
–	(Belgium) Simon Balcaen (Belgium) Mathieu Castelein (Belgium) Pierre Castelein (France) Steven Palette	(Antigua and Barbuda) Haas RT					64†	64†	Ret											0
–	(Spain) Miguel Molina (United States) Custodio Toledo (France) Matthieu Vaxivière	(Italy) AF Corse					66†	66†	Ret											0
–	(Mexico) Ian Aguilera	(United Kingdom) Paradine Competition					69†	69†	Ret											0
–	(United States) Chandler Hull	(United Kingdom) JMW Motorsport	Ret																	0
–	(Australia) Jayden Ojeda	(United Arab Emirates) GetSpeed Team Dubai												Ret						0
–	(Germany) Max Moritz (Austria) Raphael Rennhofer	(Denmark) High Class Racing																	Ret	0
–	(Austria) Dominik Baumann (Russia) Nikita Mazepin	(Germany) Team Motopark																	Ret	0
–	(United Kingdom) Ross Gunn	(Belgium) Comtoyou Racing																	Ret	0
–	(Germany) Lucas Wolf	(United Kingdom) Ziggo Sport Tempesta Racing																	Ret	0
Pos.	Drivers	Team	LEC (France)	S1	S2	MNZ (Italy)	6hrs	12hrs	24hrs	S1	S2	S1	S2	NÜR (Germany)	S1	S2	S1	S2	POR (Portugal)	Points
Pos.	Drivers	Team	LEC (France)	BRH (United Kingdom)		MNZ (Italy)	SPA (Belgium)			MIS (Italy)		MAG (France)		NÜR (Germany)	ZAN (Netherlands)		BAR (Spain)		POR (Portugal)	Points

Key
Colour	Result
Gold	Race winner
Silver	2nd place
Bronze	3rd place
Green	Points finish
Blue	Non-points finish
Blue	Non-classified finish (NC)
Purple	Did not finish (Ret)
Black	Disqualified (DSQ)
Black	Excluded (EX)
White	Did not start (DNS)
White	Race cancelled (C)
White	Withdrew (WD)
Blank	Did not participate

^{P} – Pole

===== Gold Cup =====
Pos.	Drivers	Team	LEC (France)	BRH (United Kingdom)		MNZ (Italy)	SPA (Belgium)			MIS (Italy)		MAG (France)		NÜR (Germany)	ZAN (Netherlands)		BAR (Spain)		POR (Portugal)	Points
Pos.	Drivers	Team	LEC (France)	S1	S2	MNZ (Italy)	6hrs	12hrs	24hrs	S1	S2	S1	S2	NÜR (Germany)	S1	S2	S1	S2	POR (Portugal)	Points
1	(United Kingdom) Tom Fleming (Monaco) Louis Prette	(United Kingdom) Garage 59	1^{P}	2	Ret	2	1	1	6^{P}	2	2	3	4	Ret^{P}	1^{P}	6^{P}	7	6	DSQ	169.5
2	(France) Simon Gachet	(France) CSA Racing	2	4	1	5	5	3	5	8	3	8	3	6	Ret	5	3	3	6	144
3	(United Kingdom) James Kell	(France) CSA Racing	2	3	5	5	5	3	5	5	6^{P}	5	1^{P}	6	6	7	6	7	6	137.5
4	(Luxembourg) Dylan Pereira	(Germany) Tresor Attempto Racing	Ret	Ret^{P}	Ret	Ret^{P}	8†	8†	Ret	1^{P}	1	4	7	1	5	3	1^{P}	2	5	130.5
5	(Germany) Alex Aka	(Germany) Tresor Attempto Racing	Ret	Ret^{P}	Ret		8†	8†	Ret	1^{P}	1	4	7	1	5	3	1^{P}	2	5	129.5
6	(France) Arthur Rougier	(France) CSA Racing	2	3	5	5	5	3	5	5	6^{P}	5	1^{P}	6	6	7	6	7		129.5
7	(Sweden) Robin Knutsson (Belgium) Gilles Magnus	(Belgium) Boutsen VDS	Ret	Ret	DNS^{P}	Ret	4	4	2	4	7	1^{P}	5	2	4	2	5	5	Ret	114.5
8	(Germany) Jens Klingmann (Germany) Tim Tramnitz (Belgium) Ugo de Wilde	(Germany) ROWE Racing	3			3	2	2	1					4					2	107
9	(Italy) Tommaso Mosca (Peru) Matías Zagazeta	(Italy) AF Corse		1	2					3	5	2	2		2	1	8	4		106
10	(Denmark) Simon Birch (Denmark) Malte Ebdrup (Denmark) Frederik Schandorff	(Denmark) Selected Car Racing	4			1	3	6	4					3					1^{P}	104
11	(Germany) Benjamin Goethe	(United Kingdom) Garage 59	1^{P}			2	1	1	6^{P}					Ret^{P}					DSQ	86
12	(France) Romain Andriolo	(France) CSA Racing		4	1					8	3	8	3		Ret	5	3	3		72
13	(Italy) Mattia Michelotto (Italy) Loris Spinelli	(Italy) VSR		5	3					7	4	6	Ret		3	4	4	1		71.5
14	(Denmark) Dennis Lind	(United Kingdom) Steller Motorsport	6			4	7	7	7					5					7	49
15	(United Kingdom) Harry George (United Kingdom) Adam Smalley (United Kingdom) Freddie Tomlinson	(United Kingdom) Optimum Motorsport	7			Ret	6	5	3					7					4	48
16	(United Kingdom) David Pittard (Netherlands) Jop Rappange	(Netherlands) KPX Motorsport		6	4					6	8	7	6		7	8	2	Ret		43
17	(France) Antoine Doquin	(United Kingdom) Steller Motorsport	6			4	7	7	7					5						43
18	(Italy) Andrea Frassineti	(Germany) Tresor Attempto Racing	Ret			Ret^{P}	8†	8†	Ret					1					5	40
19	(France) Alessandro Ghiretti	(Belgium) Boutsen VDS	Ret			Ret	4	4	2										Ret	30
20	(Denmark) Mikkel Mac	(United Kingdom) Steller Motorsport				4								5					7	28
21	(Netherlands) Ruben del Sarte	(United Kingdom) Optimum Motorsport					6	5	3											24
22	(Denmark) Conrad Laursen	(Denmark) Selected Car Racing					3	6	4											23
23	(France) Jim Pla	(France) CSA Racing					5	3	5										6	22
24	(Germany) Nico Menzel	(Belgium) Boutsen VDS												2						18
25	(Finland) Konsta Lappalainen	(United Kingdom) JMW Motorsport																	3	15
26	(Netherlands) Robert De Haan (Brazil) Christian Hahn (United Kingdom) Ashley Sutton	(United Kingdom) Paradine Competition	5																	12
27	(Denmark) Mikkel Gaarde Pedersen (Germany) Lenny Ried	(United Kingdom) Steller Motorsport					7	7	7											12
28	(Spain) Lorenzo Fluxá Cross	(United Kingdom) Steller Motorsport	6																	9
29	(Italy) Lorenzo Ferrari	(Germany) Tresor Attempto Racing				Ret^{P}														1
Not classified
–	(San Marino) Giacomo Altoè (United Kingdom) Casper Stevenson	(United Kingdom) JMW Motorsport																	3	0
–	(Denmark) Kasper H. Jensen	(United Kingdom) Steller Motorsport																	7	0
Pos.	Drivers	Team	LEC (France)	S1	S2	MNZ (Italy)	6hrs	12hrs	24hrs	S1	S2	S1	S2	NÜR (Germany)	S1	S2	S1	S2	POR (Portugal)	Points
Pos.	Drivers	Team	LEC (France)	BRH (United Kingdom)		MNZ (Italy)	SPA (Belgium)			MIS (Italy)		MAG (France)		NÜR (Germany)	ZAN (Netherlands)		BAR (Spain)		POR (Portugal)	Points

===== Silver Cup =====
Pos.	Drivers	Team	LEC (France)	BRH (United Kingdom)		MNZ (Italy)	SPA (Belgium)			MIS (Italy)		MAG (France)		NÜR (Germany)	ZAN (Netherlands)		BAR (Spain)		POR (Portugal)	Points
Pos.	Drivers	Team	LEC (France)	S1	S2	MNZ (Italy)	6hrs	12hrs	24hrs	S1	S2	S1	S2	NÜR (Germany)	S1	S2	S1	S2	POR (Portugal)	Points
1	(Belgium) Matisse Lismont (Argentina) Ignacio Montenegro	(Belgium) Team WRT	2	2^{P}	1^{P}	6	1	4	2	1	3	1	1^{P}	2^{P}	1^{P}	2	8	Ret	1^{P}	236
2	(Portugal) Guilherme Oliveira (United Kingdom) Mikey Porter	(United Kingdom) Optimum Motorsport	Ret	1	2	Ret	5	1	4	6	10	10	2	Ret	4	8	1	4	4	120.5
3	(United States) Anthony Bartone (France) Aurélien Panis	(United States) GetSpeed Team BartoneBros	9	4	10	5	7	5	8^{P}	3	1^{P}	4	4	3	10	6	9	6	2	119.5
4	(Israel) Ariel Levi	(Germany) Tresor Attempto Racing	4	7	12	1	15†	15†	Ret	Ret^{P}	DNS	2	5	8	2	5	Ret	1	3	115.5
5	(Belgium) Amaury Cordeel	(Belgium) Team WRT	2			6	1	4	2					2^{P}					1	113
6	(Belgium) Jef Machiels (Belgium) Gilles Stadsbader	(Italy) AF Corse	7	9	3	Ret	3	2	3	4	4	Ret	10	6	8	4	2	2	10	106.5
7	(Sweden) Oliver Söderström	(Belgium) Comtoyou Racing	3^{P}	8	8	9	4	14†	Ret	5	7	5^{P}	3	5	3	1^{P}	7	5	11	106
8	(Ecuador) Mateo Villagomez	(Germany) Walkenhorst Motorsport	10	3	4	8	16†	16†	Ret	2	2	3	7	10	6	3	4	3	14	92.5
9	(United Arab Emirates) Jamie Day	(Germany) Walkenhorst Motorsport		3	4					2	2	3	7		6	3	4	3		86.5
10	(France) Arthur Dorison	(Belgium) Comtoyou Racing		8	8		4	14†	Ret	5	7	5^{P}	3		3	1^{P}	7	5		73
11	(Philippines) Eduardo Coseteng	(Germany) HRT Ford Racing	5			Ret^{P}	9	3	5					1					5	66
12	(United Kingdom) Alex Malykhin	(Lithuania) Pure Rxcing	1	6	5	12†	6	13†	Ret	10	8	8	Ret	4	11	11	Ret	Ret	Ret	64
13	(Italy) Rocco Mazzola (Denmark) Sebastian Øgaard	(Germany) Tresor Attempto Racing	4			1	15†	15†	Ret					8					3	59
14	(France) César Gazeau	(United States) GetSpeed Team BartoneBros	9			5	7	5	8^{P}					3					2	58
15	(Italy) Andrea Frassineti	(Germany) Tresor Attempto Racing		7	12					Ret^{P}	DNS	2	5		2	5	Ret	1		56.5
16	(Austria) Max Hofer	(Lithuania) Pure Rxcing	1			12†	6	13†	Ret					4					Ret	49
17	(Slovenia) Alexey Nesov	(Lithuania) Pure Rxcing	1	6	5	12†	6	13†	Ret											47.5
18	(Peru) Matías Zagazeta	(Italy) AF Corse	7			Ret	3	2	3					6					10	47
19	(Belgium) Nicolas Baert	(Germany) HRT Ford Racing												1					5	44
19	(Belgium) Nicolas Baert	(Germany) Lionspeed GP													5	Ret	3	7		44
20	(Netherlands) Dante Rappange	(United Kingdom) Optimum Motorsport	Ret			Ret	5	1	4					Ret					4	41
21	(Netherlands) Maxime Oosten	(Germany) HRT Ford Racing	5			Ret^{P}	9	3	5										5	41
22	(France) Sébastien Baud (Belgium) Kobe Pauwels	(Belgium) Comtoyou Racing	3^{P}			9	4	14†	Ret					5					11	39
23	(Thailand) Tanart Sathienthirakul	(Italy) Dinamic GT	11	12	11	4	13	8	7	9	9	9	6	11	9	10	5	10	Ret	37
24	(France) Gaspard Simon	(Germany) Walkenhorst Motorsport	10	5	7	8	16†	16†	Ret	7	5	6	8	10	7	9	Ret	8		36.5
25	(United Arab Emirates) Mathieu Detry	(Belgium) Team WRT					1	4	2											36
26	(Spain) Rafael Duran	(Germany) Rinaldi Racing	12			7	10	6	1					Ret						35
=	(United States) Dylan Medler (South Africa) David Perel	(Germany) Rinaldi Racing	12			7	10	6	1					Ret					13	35
27	(Italy) Francesco Braschi	(Italy) AF Corse					3	2	3											31
28	(Germany) Finn Wiebelhaus	(Germany) HRT Ford Racing	5			Ret^{P}	9	3	5											31
29	(France) Maxime Robin	(Germany) Walkenhorst Motorsport		5	7		16†	16†	Ret	7	5	6	8		7	9	Ret	8		30.5
30	(Germany) Ben Dörr (United Kingdom) Horatio Fitz-Simon (United Kingdom) Max Lynn	(United Kingdom) Team RJN	8			3	14	11	10					9					7	30
31	(Italy) Alessandro Balzan	(Germany) Rinaldi Racing					10	6	1											29
32	(Germany) Salman Owega	(United Kingdom) Optimum Motorsport					5	1	4											29
33	(Thailand) Carl Bennet (Switzerland) Felix Hirsiger	(Italy) AF Corse		10	6					8	6	7	9		Ret	7	6^{P}	9		26.5
34	(Ukraine) Ivan Klymenko	(France) Saintéloc Racing	6			11†	2	10	9										8	26
=	(France) Etienne Cheli (Argentina) Ezequiel Perez Companc	(France) Saintéloc Racing	6			11†	2	10	9					Ret					8	26
35	(Germany) Niklas Kalus	(Germany) HRT Ford Racing												1						25
36	(Belgium) Lorens Lecertua	(France) CSA Racing	Ret			2	12	7	12											21
36	(Belgium) Lorens Lecertua	(France) Saintéloc Racing												Ret						21
=	(France) Romain Andriolo	(France) CSA Racing	Ret			2	12	7	12					Ret						21
=	(Belgium) Baptiste Moulin	(France) CSA Racing	Ret			2	12	7	12											21
37	(Italy) Francesco Simonazzi (United Kingdom) Angus Whiteside	(Italy) Dinamic GT	11			4	13	8	7					11					Ret	20
38	(Germany) Max Reis	(Germany) HRT Ford Racing					9	3	5											18
39	(Slovenia) Mark Kastelic	(Germany) Tresor Attempto Racing					15†	15†	Ret											17
39	(Slovenia) Mark Kastelic	(Italy) Dinamic GT								9	9	9	6		9	10	5	10		17
39	(Slovenia) Mark Kastelic	(Germany) Walkenhorst Motorsport																	14	17
40	(Denmark) Mikkel O. Pedersen	(Lithuania) Pure Rxcing										8	Ret	4			Ret	Ret	Ret	14
41	(Poland) Karol Basz	(United States) GetSpeed Team BartoneBros					7	5	8^{P}											13
42	(Brazil) Christian Hahn (United Kingdom) Josh Rowledge	(United Kingdom) Paradine Competition				10	17†	17†	Ret					7					9	11
43	(Switzerland) Lucas Legeret	(France) Saintéloc Racing					2	10	9											11
43	(Switzerland) Lucas Legeret	(Germany) Walkenhorst Motorsport																	14	11
44	(Angola) Rui Andrade (Switzerland) Yannik Mettler (Hungary) Levente Révész	(Germany) Team Motopark					11	9	6											9
=	(Australia) Christian Mansell	(Germany) Team Motopark					11	9	6										6	9
45	(France) Loris Cabirou	(Italy) Dinamic GT		12	11		13	8	7											8
45	(France) Loris Cabirou	(France) CSA Racing																	12	8
46	(United Kingdom) Bobby Thompson	(United Kingdom) Paradine Competition				10								7						7
47	(Netherlands) Flynt Schuring	(Germany) Lionspeed GP													5	Ret				6
48	(Switzerland) Ethan Ischer	(Germany) Walkenhorst Motorsport	10			8	16†	16†	Ret					10						6
49	(Italy) Enzo Trulli	(Lithuania) Pure Rxcing					6	13†	Ret											4
50	(India) Sai Sanjay	(France) CSA Racing					12	7	12											3
51	(Italy) Riccardo Pera	(Lithuania) Pure Rxcing								10	8				11	11				2.5
52	(United Kingdom) Zac Meakin	(United Kingdom) Greystone GT					8	12	11											2
=	(Australia) Jayden Kelly (Spain) Tommy Pintos	(United Kingdom) Greystone GT	Ret			13†	8	12	11					Ret					Ret	2
53	(Denmark) Simon Birch (Norway) Magnus Gustavsen	(Austria) Razoon – more than racing		11	9															1
Not classified
–	(Sweden) Gustav Bergström	(Germany) Lionspeed GP															3	7		0
–	(Argentina) Marcos Siebert (United Kingdom) Aaron Walker	(Germany) Team Motopark																	6	0
–	(United Kingdom) Josh Rattican	(United Kingdom) Greystone GT	Ret			13†	8	12	11					Ret					Ret	0
–	(United Kingdom) Daryl De Leon	(United Kingdom) Paradine Competition																	9	0
–	(United States) Wyatt Brichacek	(United Kingdom) Team RJN					14	11	10											0
–	(France) Jean-Baptiste Simmenauer (United Kingdom) James Higgins	(France) CSA Racing												Ret					12	0
–	(Zimbabwe) Axcil Jefferies	(Germany) Rinaldi Racing																	13	0
–	(Mexico) Ian Aguilera (Netherlands) Jop Rappange	(United Kingdom) Paradine Competition					17†	17†	Ret											0
Pos.	Drivers	Team	LEC (France)	S1	S2	MNZ (Italy)	6hrs	12hrs	24hrs	S1	S2	S1	S2	NÜR (Germany)	S1	S2	S1	S2	POR (Portugal)	Points
Pos.	Drivers	Team	LEC (France)	BRH (United Kingdom)		MNZ (Italy)	SPA (Belgium)			MIS (Italy)		MAG (France)		NÜR (Germany)	ZAN (Netherlands)		BAR (Spain)		POR (Portugal)	Points

===== Bronze Cup =====
Pos.	Drivers	Team	LEC (France)	MNZ (Italy)	SPA (Belgium)			MIS (Italy)		MAG (France)		NÜR (Germany)	ZAN (Netherlands)		BAR (Spain)		POR (Portugal)	Points
Pos.	Drivers	Team	LEC (France)	MNZ (Italy)	6hrs	12hrs	24hrs	S1	S2	S1	S2	NÜR (Germany)	S1	S2	S1	S2	POR (Portugal)	Points
1	(Germany) Dennis Marschall	(Switzerland) Kessel Racing	5	1	1	1	1^{P}	3	5	4	Ret	3	7	3	2	2	5	171.5
2	(Germany) Marvin Dienst (Russia) Rinat Salikhov	(United States) Winward Racing	2	12†^{P}	10	7	4	2	1	1	8	2	3	4	3	3	2	159
3	(United Kingdom) Charles Dawson (United Kingdom) Kiern Jewiss	(Bahrain) 2 Seas Motorsport	4	16†	8	6	5	5	3^{P}	3^{P}	2	1^{P}	4	2^{P}	7^{P}	5	1	151.5
4	(United Kingdom) Darren Leung	(United Kingdom) Paradine Competition	3	5	2	2	2	4	8	5	1	7	2	5	4	4	4^{P}	149
5	(Italy) Eddie Cheever III	(United Kingdom) Ziggo Sport Tempesta Racing	15†	4	3	16†	Ret	6	2	2	4^{P}	4	1^{P}	1	1	1	Ret	135
6	(United States) Dustin Blattner	(Switzerland) Kessel Racing	5	1	1	1	1^{P}	3	5	4	Ret		7	3			5	132.5
7	(Republic of Ireland) Peter Dempsey	(United Kingdom) Ziggo Sport Tempesta Racing						6	2	2	4^{P}	4	1^{P}	1	1	1		116
8	(United Kingdom) James Kellett	(United Kingdom) Paradine Competition	3	5	2	2	2					7					4^{P}	84
9	(Republic of Ireland) Reece Barr	(Bahrain) 2 Seas Motorsport	4	16†	8	6	5					1^{P}					1	82
10	(Italy) Gabriele Piana	(United States) Winward Racing	2	12†^{P}	10	7	4					2					2	76
11	(Brazil) Augusto Farfus	(United Kingdom) Paradine Competition						4	8	5	1		2	5	4	4		65
12	(United Arab Emirates) Gabriel Rindone	(United Arab Emirates) GetSpeed Team Dubai	8	10	4	5	11	1^{P}	6	8	5	Ret	5	9	6	6	10	63
13	(Italy) Lorenzo Patrese	(Switzerland) Kessel Racing	5	1								3					5	62
14	(Hong Kong) Antares Au	(Germany) Rutronik Racing	1	13†	6	3	7					Ret						50
15	(France) Mathys Jaubert (United Kingdom) Ben Tuck	(Switzerland) Kessel Racing			1	1	1^{P}											50
16	(Oman) Ahmad Al Harthy (Spain) Javier Sagrera (Australia) Calan Williams	Oman Racing by Century Motorsport	6	3	14	11	Ret					5					3	49
17	(Germany) Fabian Schiller	(United Arab Emirates) GetSpeed Team Dubai						1^{P}	6	8	5		5	9	6	6		46
18	(United Arab Emirates) Constantin Dressler	(Switzerland) Kessel Racing										3			2	2		39
19	(France) Loris Cabirou (Russia) Dmitry Gvazava	(Italy) Dinamic GT						8	4	7	3		6	8	5	8		36.5
20	(South Africa) Leyton Fourie (United Kingdom) David Pittard	(United Kingdom) Paradine Competition			2	2	2											36
21	(Italy) Riccardo Pera	(Germany) Rutronik Racing	1	13†								Ret						33
=	(Netherlands) Loek Hartog	(Germany) Rutronik Racing	1															33
22	(United Kingdom) Jonny Adam (Italy) Giacomo Petrobelli	(United Kingdom) Ecurie Ecosse Blackthorn	10	2	5	9	6											33
23	(United Kingdom) Lorcan Hanafin	(United Kingdom) Ecurie Ecosse Blackthorn		2	5	9	6											32
24	(Switzerland) Alex Fontana (Germany) Patrick Kolb (United Arab Emirates) Bashar Mardini	(Germany) Lionspeed GP	Ret	6	11	4	3					9					14	31
25	(United Kingdom) Chris Froggatt	(United Kingdom) Ziggo Sport Tempesta Racing	15†	4	3	16†	Ret					4					Ret	31
26	(Germany) Carrie Schreiner	(Germany) Tresor Attempto Racing	11	9	13	15†	Ret	9	7	10	6	8	8	6	10	9	7	29
27	(Germany) Ralf Bohn (Netherlands) Huub van Eijndhoven	(Germany) Herberth Motorsport	7^{P}	8	9	8	10					6					8	27
28	(Belgium) Dries Vanthoor	(United Kingdom) Paradine Competition	3									7						25
29	(Netherlands) Robert De Haan	(United Kingdom) Paradine Competition		5													4^{P}	23
30	(Germany) Robert Renauer	(Germany) Herberth Motorsport	7^{P}	8								6					8	23
31	(Zimbabwe) Axcil Jefferies	(Germany) Lionspeed GP			11	4	3											21
32	(Hong Kong) Jonathan Hui	(United Kingdom) Ziggo Sport Tempesta Racing		4	3	16†	Ret											19
33	(Denmark) Sebastian Øgaard	(Germany) Tresor Attempto Racing						9	7	10	6		8	6	10	9		17
34	(Denmark) Michelle Gatting (Estonia) Martin Rump	(Germany) Rutronik Racing			6	3	7											17
=	(Germany) Sven Müller	(Germany) Rutronik Racing		13†	6	3	7					Ret						17
35	(Canada) Mikaël Grenier	(United Arab Emirates) GetSpeed Team Dubai	8	10	4	5	11										10	17
=	(Germany) Tom Kalender	(United Arab Emirates) GetSpeed Team Dubai	8	10	4	5	11					Ret					10	17
36	(Italy) David Fumanelli (Monaco) Marco Pulcini	(Switzerland) Kessel Racing						7	9	6	7		9	7	9	WD		16.5
37	(Australia) Garnet Patterson	(Bahrain) 2 Seas Motorsport			8	6	5											16
38	(Netherlands) Daan Arrow	(United States) Winward Racing			10	7	4											15
39	(France) Romain Leroux	(United Kingdom) Ecurie Ecosse Blackthorn			5	9	6											14
40	(Italy) Daniele Di Amato	(Germany) Tresor Attempto Racing	11	9	13	15†	Ret					8					7	12
41	(South Africa) Jarrod Waberski	(United Arab Emirates) GetSpeed Team Dubai			4	5	11											11
42	(Brazil) Marcelo Tomasoni	(Belgium) Comtoyou Racing	12	14†	12	10	Ret	10	10	11	9	10	Ret	Ret	8	7	9	10
43	(Germany) Thomas Kiefer	(United Kingdom) JMW Motorsport		7	7	14†	Ret											9
=	(Germany) Tim Heinemann (Switzerland) Rolf Ineichen	(United Kingdom) JMW Motorsport	Ret	7	7	14†	Ret											9
44	(Netherlands) Jop Rappange	(Netherlands) KPX Motorsport															6	8
45	(Austria) Gerhard Tweraser	(Austria) Razoon – more than racing	9															8
45	(Austria) Gerhard Tweraser	(Germany) Tresor Attempto Racing		9								8						8
46	(Italy) Felice Jelmini	(Belgium) Comtoyou Racing			12	10	Ret	10	10	11	9		Ret	Ret	8	7		7
47	(Netherlands) Mex Jansen	(United Kingdom) Ziggo Sport Tempesta Racing			3	16†	Ret											7
48	(Slovenia) Alexey Nesov	(Germany) Tresor Attempto Racing															7	6
49	(United Kingdom) Aaron Walker (United Kingdom) Lewis Williamson	(Bahrain) 2 Seas Motorsport			17	13	8											4
=	(United States) Jason Hart (United States) Scott Noble	(United States) GetSpeed Team Noble Racing	13															4
=	(United States) Jason Hart (United States) Scott Noble	(Bahrain) 2 Seas Motorsport			17	13	8											4
50	(France) Mathieu Jaminet (Germany) Alfred Renauer	(Germany) Herberth Motorsport			9	8	10											4
51	(United States) Aaron Muss	(Belgium) Comtoyou Racing	12	14†	12	10	Ret					10					9	3
52	(France) Pierre-Louis Chovet	(United Kingdom) JMW Motorsport			7	14†	Ret											3
53	(Belgium) Armand Fumal (Australia) Bayley Hall (Australia) Andres Latorre (Germany) Tobias Müller	(Belgium) Muehlner Motorsport			15	12	9											2
=	(Austria) Dominik Olbert (Belgium) Benjamin Paque	(Austria) Razoon – more than racing	9															2
54	(France) Michael Blanchermain (France) Jim Pla	(France) Saintéloc Racing								9	Ret							1
55	(Brazil) Sérgio Sette Câmara	(Germany) Tresor Attempto Racing			13	15†	Ret											1
55	(Brazil) Sérgio Sette Câmara	(Belgium) Comtoyou Racing										10						1
=	(United Kingdom) Tom Wood	(United Kingdom) Ecurie Ecosse Blackthorn	10															1
Not classified
–	(Netherlands) Yelmer Buurman (Netherlands) Nigel Schoonderwoerd	(Netherlands) KPX Motorsport															6	0
–	(France) Valentin Hasse-Clot	(Belgium) Comtoyou Racing															9	0
–	(Canada) Kyle Marcelli	(Belgium) Comtoyou Racing	12	14†	12	10	Ret											0
–	(Italy) Alberto Di Folco	(Germany) Tresor Attempto Racing	11															0
–	(Netherlands) Colin Caresani (Mexico) Alfredo Hernández (France) Stéphane Tribaudini	(Mexico) Grupo Prom Racing Team	14	11								11						0
–	(Brazil) Pedro Ebrahim	Oman Racing by Century Motorsport			14	11	Ret											0
–	(France) Jordan Boisson (France) Patrick Charlaix (France) Marvin Klein	(Germany) GetSpeed Team PCX															11	0
–	(Germany) Max Mutschlechner (Austria) Leo Pichler (Austria) Richard Wolf	(Austria) Razoon – more than racing															12	0
–	(United Kingdom) Philip Ellis	(United States) GetSpeed Team Noble Racing	13															0
–	(Greece) Georgios Kolovos	(Austria) Razoon – more than racing		15†														0
–	(Greece) Georgios Kolovos	(Germany) Tresor Attempto Racing			13	15†	Ret											0
–	(Italy) Pietro Armanni (Canada) Reinhold Krahn (Germany) Joel Sturm	(Germany) Car Collection Motorsport															13	0
–	(Italy) Stefano Costantini	(United Kingdom) Ziggo Sport Tempesta Racing	15†															0
–	(Greece) Stylianos Kolovos (Germany) Lenny Ried	(Austria) Razoon – more than racing		15†														0
–	(Brazil) Marcos Gomes (Brazil) Alan Hellmeister (Brazil) Sebastião Malucelli	(Austria) Razoon – more than racing															15	0
–	(Austria) Klaus Bachler (Germany) Max Moritz (Austria) Raphael Rennhofer	(Denmark) High Class Racing															Ret	0
–	(Germany) Lucas Wolf	(United Kingdom) Ziggo Sport Tempesta Racing															Ret	
–	(United States) Chandler Hull	(United Kingdom) JMW Motorsport	Ret															0
–	(Australia) Jayden Ojeda	(United Arab Emirates) GetSpeed Team Dubai										Ret						0
Pos.	Drivers	Team	LEC (France)	MNZ (Italy)	6hrs	12hrs	24hrs	S1	S2	S1	S2	NÜR (Germany)	S1	S2	S1	S2	POR (Portugal)	Points
Pos.	Drivers	Team	LEC (France)	MNZ (Italy)	SPA (Belgium)			MIS (Italy)		MAG (France)		NÜR (Germany)	ZAN (Netherlands)		BAR (Spain)		POR (Portugal)	Points

=== Teams' championship standings ===
==== Overall ====
Pos.	Team	LEC (France)	BRH (United Kingdom)		MNZ (Italy)	SPA (Belgium)			MIS (Italy)		MAG (France)		NÜR (Germany)	ZAN (Netherlands)		BAR (Spain)		POR (Portugal)	Points
Pos.	Team	LEC (France)	S1	S2	MNZ (Italy)	6hrs	12hrs	24hrs	S1	S2	S1	S2	NÜR (Germany)	S1	S2	S1	S2	POR (Portugal)	Points
1	(Belgium) Team WRT	4	3	4	17	2	8	6	1^{P}	1	6	2	2	8	4	10	6	5	152.5
2	(United States) Winward Racing	2^{P}	6	3	2	3	4	2	3	3	4	19	4	13	8	7	11	14	138.5
3	(Germany) Lionspeed GP	Ret	Ret^{P}	1^{P}	21	15	5	1	2	20	11	1	15	23	2	2^{P}	24	2	122
4	(Italy) AF Corse	14	1	15	11	16	12	3^{P}	9	6	2	4	11	6	5	23	2	4	99.5
5	(United Kingdom) Garage 59	3	8	5	18	4	3	36	12	7	5	7	10	1	13	4	9	6	93.5
6	(Bahrain) 2 Seas Motorsport	9	12	2	41†	10	6	27	26	2^{P}	1^{P}	8	3	5	9	12	5	9	92
7	(Belgium) Boutsen VDS	11	2	12	4	7	15	8	17	18	8	12	8	2^{P}	10	6	28	3^{P}	82.5
8	(Belgium) Comtoyou Racing	1	9	14	27	11	22	Ret	16	27	3	15^{P}	1^{P}	9	12	18	7	32	81
9	(Switzerland) Emil Frey Racing		5	9					4	5	15	17		3	1	Ret	1		71
10	(Germany) Tresor Attempto Racing	21	22	31	1	54	56†	Ret	5	8	14	21	7	14	14	1	3	15	67.5
11	(Germany) GetSpeed	7	17	29	13	23	26	28	19	13	25	20	5	34	26	32	22	1	44.5
12	(Germany) ROWE Racing	6			5	5	10	9					17					7	39
13	(Germany) Rutronik Racing	13	20	18	7	18	18	19	11	26	41	3	19	22	7	3	Ret	50	34
14	(France) CSA Racing	8	21	10	3	21	14	34	18	11	19	6	27	28	24	13	16	34	30.5
15	(Austria) Eastalent Racing	15	23	17	20	1	51	Ret	8	35	Ret	5	Ret	21	Ret	14	14	Ret	23
16	(Switzerland) Kessel Racing	28			8	14	1	10	24	34	23	35	26	37	27	9	21	33	21
17	(Germany) HRT Ford Racing	25			Ret^{P}	6	7	18					6					16	16
18	(Germany) Walkenhorst Motorsport	34	16	20	24	32	9	7	14	16	24	26	16	29	19	26	15	12	14
19	(United Kingdom) Paradine Competition	23			16	19	2	13	25	38	31	23	34	18	35	20	29	25	11
20	(Italy) VSR		28	23					36	12	22	Ret		10	17	15	4		10.5
21	(United Kingdom) Team RJN	31			6	59	50	35					39					23	8
22	(United Kingdom) Ziggo Sport Tempesta Racing	49†			15	20	57†	Ret	35	30	18	28	31	17	21	5	20	Ret	6
23	(United Kingdom) Optimum Motorsport	45	13	13	Ret	30	11	17	29	33	42	13	28	25	29	21	18	19	2.5
24	(Netherlands) KPX Motorsport		29	24					30	25	26	31		30	37	8	Ret	35	2
25	(United Kingdom) Ecurie Ecosse Blackthorn	41			9	27	41	31											2
26	(Italy) Dinamic GT	37	31	30	10	48	35	25	33	29	34	22	43	33	32	27	27	Ret	1
=	(Germany) Rinaldi Racing	42			19	42	29	14					Ret					41	1
Not classified
–	(France) Schumacher CLRT					12	17	4											0
–	(Austria) Razoon – more than racing	40	30	28	40†	56	54	42						4	18			43	0
–	(United Kingdom) Century Motorsport	29			12	55	48	Ret					33					26	0
–	(Lithuania) Pure Rxcing	17	19	21	37†	31	58†	Ret	34	28	35	Ret	22	39	33	Ret	Ret	Ret	0
–	(United Kingdom) JMW Motorsport	Ret			22	36	55†	Ret					30					17	0
–	(Austria) TGI Team by GRT	39			Ret	60	60†	Ret					18					51	0
–	(United Kingdom) Steller Motorsport	38			26	58	45	41					21					48	0
–	(Germany) Team Motopark					44	36	23										22	0
–	(France) Saintéloc Racing	30			36†	25	40	30			38	Ret	Ret					24	0
–	(Germany) Herberth Motorsport	35			25	39	32	46					35					37	0
–	(Malaysia) Johor Motorsports Racing JMR					51	38	29											0
–	(Mexico) Grupo Prom Racing Team	47			32	63†	63†	Ret					46						0
–	(Denmark) High Class Racing					46	39	32										Ret	0
–	(United Kingdom) Greystone GT	Ret			42†	34	52	37					Ret					Ret	0
–	(San Marino) Tsunami RT					53	47	38											0
–	(Germany) Car Collection Motorsport					49	46	39										44	0
–	(Belgium) Muehlner Motorsport					57	49	45											0
–	(Antigua and Barbuda) Haas RT					64†	64†	Ret											0
Pos.	Team	LEC (France)	S1	S2	MNZ (Italy)	6hrs	12hrs	24hrs	S1	S2	S1	S2	NÜR (Germany)	S1	S2	S1	S2	POR (Portugal)	Points
Pos.	Team	LEC (France)	BRH (United Kingdom)		MNZ (Italy)	SPA (Belgium)			MIS (Italy)		MAG (France)		NÜR (Germany)	ZAN (Netherlands)		BAR (Spain)		POR (Portugal)	Points

===== Gold Cup =====
Pos.	Team	LEC (France)	BRH (United Kingdom)		MNZ (Italy)	SPA (Belgium)			MIS (Italy)		MAG (France)		NÜR (Germany)	ZAN (Netherlands)		BAR (Spain)		POR (Portugal)	Points
Pos.	Team	LEC (France)	S1	S2	MNZ (Italy)	6hrs	12hrs	24hrs	S1	S2	S1	S2	NÜR (Germany)	S1	S2	S1	S2	POR (Portugal)	Points
1	(Italy) AF Corse	4	1	2	1	3	6	4	3	5	2	2	3	2	1	8	4	1^{P}	211
2	(United Kingdom) Garage 59	1^{P}	2	Ret	2	1	1	6^{P}	2	2	3	4	Ret^{P}	1^{P}	6^{P}	7	6	DSQ	173
3	(France) CSA Racing	2	3	1	5	5	3	5	5	3^{P}	5	1^{P}	6	6	5	3	3	6	167.5
4	(Germany) Tresor Attempto Racing	Ret	Ret^{P}	Ret	Ret^{P}	8†	8†	Ret	1^{P}	1	4	7	1	5	3	1^{P}	2	5	132
5	(Belgium) Boutsen VDS	Ret	Ret	DNS^{P}	Ret	4	4	2	4	7	1^{P}	5	2	4	2	5	5	Ret	117.5
6	(Germany) ROWE Racing	3			3	2	2	1					4					2	107
7	(Italy) VSR		5	3					7	4	6	Ret		3	4	4	1		73
8	(United Kingdom) Steller Motorsport	6			4	7	7	7					5					7	49
9	(Netherlands) KPX Motorsport		6	4					6	8	7	6		7	8	2	Ret		48
10	(United Kingdom) Optimum Motorsport	7			Ret	6	5	3					7					4	48
11	(United Kingdom) JMW Motorsport																	3	15
12	(United Kingdom) Paradine Competition	5																	12
Pos.	Team	LEC (France)	S1	S2	MNZ (Italy)	6hrs	12hrs	24hrs	S1	S2	S1	S2	NÜR (Germany)	S1	S2	S1	S2	POR (Portugal)	Points
Pos.	Team	LEC (France)	BRH (United Kingdom)		MNZ (Italy)	SPA (Belgium)			MIS (Italy)		MAG (France)		NÜR (Germany)	ZAN (Netherlands)		BAR (Spain)		POR (Portugal)	Points

===== Silver Cup =====
Pos.	Team	LEC (France)	BRH (United Kingdom)		MNZ (Italy)	SPA (Belgium)			MIS (Italy)		MAG (France)		NÜR (Germany)	ZAN (Netherlands)		BAR (Spain)		POR (Portugal)	Points
Pos.	Team	LEC (France)	S1	S2	MNZ (Italy)	6hrs	12hrs	24hrs	S1	S2	S1	S2	NÜR (Germany)	S1	S2	S1	S2	POR (Portugal)	Points
1	(Belgium) Team WRT	2	2^{P}	1^{P}	6	1	4	2	1	3	1	1^{P}	2^{P}	1^{P}	2	8	Ret	1^{P}	237.5
2	(Germany) GetSpeed	9	4	10	5	7	5	8^{P}	3	1^{P}	4	4	3	10	6	9	6	2	124.5
3	(United Kingdom) Optimum Motorsport	Ret	1	2	Ret	5	1	4	6	10	10	2	Ret	4	8	1	4	4	123.5
4	(Germany) Tresor Attempto Racing	4	7	12	1	15†	15†	Ret	Ret^{P}	DNS	2	5	8	2	5	Ret	1	3	117.5
5	(Italy) AF Corse	7	9	3	Ret	3	2	3	4	4	7	9	6	8	4	2^{P}	2	10	115.5
6	(Belgium) Comtoyou Racing	3^{P}	8	8	9	4	14†	Ret	5	7	5^{P}	3	5	3	1^{P}	7	5	11	114
7	(Germany) Walkenhorst Motorsport	10	3	4	8	16†	16†	Ret	2	2	3	7	10	6	3	4	3	14	92.5
8	(Lithuania) Pure Rxcing	1	6	5	12†	6	13†	Ret	10	8	8	Ret	4	11	11	Ret	Ret	Ret	72
9	(Germany) HRT Ford Racing	5			Ret^{P}	9	3	5					1					5	66
10	(Italy) Dinamic GT	11	12	11	4	13	8	7	9	9	9	6	11	9	10	5	10	Ret	50.5
11	(Germany) Rinaldi Racing	12			7	10	6	1					Ret					13	35
12	(United Kingdom) Team RJN	8			3	14	11	10					9					7	31
13	(France) Saintéloc Racing	6			11†	2	10	9					Ret					8	29
14	(France) CSA Racing	Ret			2	12	7	12					Ret					12	21
15	(United Kingdom) Paradine Competition				10	17†	17†	Ret					7					9	11
16	(Germany) Lionspeed GP													5	Ret	3	7		6
17	(Austria) Razoon – more than racing		11	9															4
18	(United Kingdom) Greystone GT	Ret			13†	8	12	11					Ret					Ret	3
Not classified
–	(Germany) Team Motopark					11	9	6										6	0
Pos.	Team	LEC (France)	S1	S2	MNZ (Italy)	6hrs	12hrs	24hrs	S1	S2	S1	S2	NÜR (Germany)	S1	S2	S1	S2	POR (Portugal)	Points
Pos.	Team	LEC (France)	BRH (United Kingdom)		MNZ (Italy)	SPA (Belgium)			MIS (Italy)		MAG (France)		NÜR (Germany)	ZAN (Netherlands)		BAR (Spain)		POR (Portugal)	Points

===== Bronze Cup =====
Pos.	Team	LEC (France)	MNZ (Italy)	SPA (Belgium)			MIS (Italy)		MAG (France)		NÜR (Germany)	ZAN (Netherlands)		BAR (Spain)		POR (Portugal)	Points
Pos.	Team	LEC (France)	MNZ (Italy)	6hrs	12hrs	24hrs	S1	S2	S1	S2	NÜR (Germany)	S1	S2	S1	S2	POR (Portugal)	Points
1	(Switzerland) Kessel Racing	5	1	1	1	1^{P}	3	5	4	7	3	7	3	2	2	5	174.5
2	(United States) Winward Racing	2	12†^{P}	10	7	4	2	1	1	8	2	3	4	3	3	2	159
3	(Bahrain) 2 Seas Motorsport	4	16†	8	6	5	5	3^{P}	3^{P}	2	1^{P}	4	2^{P}	7^{P}	5	1	151.5
4	(United Kingdom) Paradine Competition	3	5	2	2	2	4	8	5	1	7	2	5	4	4	4^{P}	149
5	(United Kingdom) Ziggo Sport Tempesta Racing	14†	4	3	16†	Ret	6	2	2	4^{P}	4	1^{P}	1	1	1	Ret	135
6	(Germany) GetSpeed	8	10	4	5	11	1^{P}	6	8	5	Ret	5	9	6	6	10	67
7	(Germany) Rutronik Racing	1	13†	6	3	7					Ret						50
8	(United Kingdom) Century Motorsport	6	3	14	11	Ret					5					3	49
9	(Italy) Dinamic GT						8	4	7	3		6	8	5	8		40
10	(United Kingdom) Ecurie Ecosse Blackthorn	10	2	5	9	6											33
11	(Germany) Lionspeed GP	Ret	6	11	4	3					9					14	31
12	(Germany) Tresor Attempto Racing	11	9	13	15†	Ret	9	7	10	6	8	8	6	10	9	7	31
13	(Germany) Herberth Motorsport	7^{P}	8	9	8	10					6					8	30
14	(Belgium) Comtoyou Racing	12	14†	12	10	Ret	10	10	11	9	10	Ret	Ret	8	7	9	11.5
15	(United Kingdom) JMW Motorsport	Ret	7	7	14†	Ret											9
16	(France) Saintéloc Racing								9	Ret							2
17	(Austria) Razoon – more than racing	9	15†													12	2
Not classified
–	(Netherlands) KPX Motorsport															6	0
–	(Belgium) Muehlner Motorsport			15	12	9											0
–	(Mexico) Grupo Prom Racing Team	13	11								11						0
–	(Germany) Car Collection Motorsport															13	0
–	(Denmark) High Class Racing															Ret	0
Pos.	Team	LEC (France)	MNZ (Italy)	6hrs	12hrs	24hrs	S1	S2	S1	S2	NÜR (Germany)	S1	S2	S1	S2	POR (Portugal)	Points
Pos.	Team	LEC (France)	MNZ (Italy)	SPA (Belgium)			MIS (Italy)		MAG (France)		NÜR (Germany)	ZAN (Netherlands)		BAR (Spain)		POR (Portugal)	Points

Notes:

- † – Entry did not finish the race but was classified, as it completed more than 75% of the race distance.

== See also ==
- 2026 Intercontinental GT Challenge
- 2026 GT World Challenge Europe Endurance Cup
- 2026 GT World Challenge Europe Sprint Cup
- 2026 GT World Challenge Asia
- 2026 GT World Challenge America
- 2026 GT World Challenge Australia
- 2026 British GT Championship
- 2026 SRO Japan Cup
- 2026 GT America Series
- 2026 GT3 Revival Series
