= 2026 Bathurst 12 Hour =

Endurance race in Australia

(Australia) Bathurst 12 Hour
Event information
- Round 1 of 5 in the 2026 Intercontinental GT Challenge
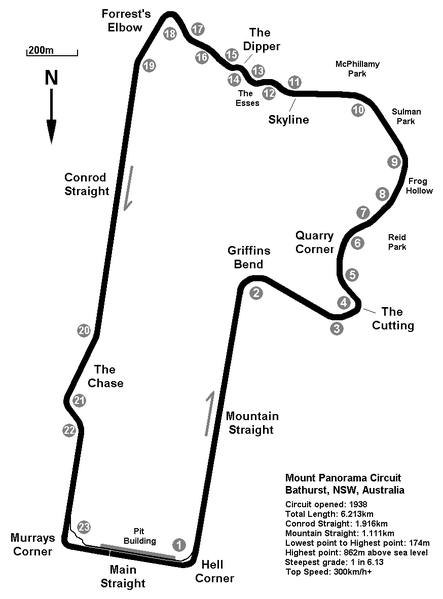
- Date: 15 February 2026
- Location: Bathurst, New South Wales, Australia
- Venue: Mount Panorama Circuit
- Duration: 12 Hours

Results
- Laps completed: 262
- Distance: 1,627.806 km (1,011.472 mi)

Pole position
- Time: 2:01.079
- Team: (Australia) Scott Taylor Motorsport
- Drivers: (Australia) Cameron Waters

Winners
- Time: 12:01:39.898
- Team: (Hong Kong) Mercedes-AMG Team GMR
- Drivers: (Germany) Maro Engel (Canada) Mikaël Grenier (Belgium) Maxime Martin

The 2026 Bathurst 12 Hour (commercially titled 2026 Meguiar's Bathurst 12 Hour) was an endurance race for FIA GT3 cars and invited vehicles, staged at the Mount Panorama Circuit, Bathurst, New South Wales, Australia on 15 February 2026. It was the opening round of the 2026 Intercontinental GT Challenge.

The race was marred by the first red flag in nearly a decade. Tsunami RT's Johannes Zelger in the GT3 Bronze class was involved in an incident with Volante Rosso Motorsport's Damien Hamilton in the GT3 Pro-Am class at Forrest’s Elbow. While the incident was minor, both Zelger and Hamilton were stopped in the turn. Team Craft-Bamboo Racing's Ralf Aron was leading the GT3 Pro field as they approached Forrest’s Elbow. Aron would end up colliding into Zelger's car at nearly full speed. The race was red flagged within a minute and was stopped for nearly an hour.

Aron would end up crawling out of his car and was transported to a regional hospital. The incident was criticized for a lack of flags giving warning in the run up to the stoppage at Forrest’s Elbow.

== Entry list ==
=== Class structure ===
Entries were divided into classes based on car type and driver ratings.

- Class A – GT3 (Current Specification FIA GT3 cars)
  - Pro – No Driver Restrictions
  - Pro-Am – For driving combinations featuring one or two FIA Platinum, FIA Gold, or FIA Silver and two FIA Bronze related drivers.
  - Silver Cup – For driving combinations featuring only FIA Silver and Bronze drivers.
  - Bronze – For driving combinations featuring one Platinum or Gold, one Silver and one Bronze driver.
- Class B – Porsche Cup
  - Class for Porsche GT3 Cup from One-make racing series.
- Class C – GT4 (Current Specification SRO GT4 cars)
- Class I – Invitational class
  - For IRC GT cars, SRO GT2 cars and other special GT cars.

=== Entries ===
No.	Entrant	Car	Driver 1	Driver 2	Driver 3	Driver 4
Class A (GT3 Pro) (15 entries)
2	(Malaysia) Johor Motorsports Racing JMR	Chevrolet Corvette Z06 GT3.R	(New Zealand) Earl Bamber	(Netherlands) Nicky Catsburg	(United Kingdom) Alexander Sims	
6	(Australia) Mercedes-AMG Team Tigani Motorsport	Mercedes-AMG GT3 Evo	(Switzerland) Philip Ellis	(Australia) Jayden Ojeda	(Germany) Fabian Schiller	
26	(Australia) Arise Racing GT	Ferrari 296 GT3	(New Zealand) Jaxon Evans	(Italy) Davide Rigon	(Brazil) Daniel Serra	
32	(Belgium) Team WRT	BMW M4 GT3 Evo	(South Africa) Jordan Pepper	(South Africa) Kelvin van der Linde	(Belgium) Charles Weerts	
46	(Belgium) Team WRT	BMW M4 GT3 Evo	(Brazil) Augusto Farfus	(Switzerland) Raffaele Marciello	(Italy) Valentino Rossi	
55	(Australia) Jamec Racing Team MPC	Audi R8 LMS Evo II	(Australia) Will Brown	(Germany) Christopher Haase	(Australia) Brad Schumacher	
61	(New Zealand) EBM	Porsche 911 GT3 R (992)	(Austria) Klaus Bachler	(Switzerland) Ricardo Feller	(Germany) Laurin Heinrich	
64	(Germany) HRT Ford Racing	Ford Mustang GT3	(Australia) Broc Feeney	(Germany) Christopher Mies	(Norway) Dennis Olsen	
75	(Australia) 75 Express	Mercedes-AMG GT3 Evo	(Andorra) Jules Gounon	(Australia) Kenny Habul	(Germany) Luca Stolz	
77	(Hong Kong) Mercedes-AMG Team Craft-Bamboo Racing	Mercedes-AMG GT3 Evo	(Estonia) Ralf Aron	(Austria) Lucas Auer	(Germany) Maximilian Götz	
95	(United Kingdom) Optimum Motorsport	McLaren 720S GT3 Evo	(United Kingdom) Ben Barnicoat	(Germany) Marvin Kirchhöfer	(Australia) Garnet Patterson	
100	(Australia) Grove Racing	Mercedes-AMG GT3 Evo	(Australia) Kai Allen	(Australia) Will Davison	(Australia) Brenton Grove	
222	(Australia) Scott Taylor Motorsport	Mercedes-AMG GT3 Evo	(Australia) Chaz Mostert	(Australia) Thomas Randle	(Australia) Cameron Waters	
888	(Hong Kong) Mercedes-AMG Team GMR	Mercedes-AMG GT3 Evo	(Germany) Maro Engel	(Canada) Mikaël Grenier	(Belgium) Maxime Martin	
911	(Hong Kong) Absolute Racing	Porsche 911 GT3 R (992)	(Denmark) Bastian Buus	(Australia) Matt Campbell	(Belgium) Alessio Picariello	
Class A (GT3 Silver) (1 entry)
15	(Australia) Volante Rosso Motorsport	McLaren 720S GT3 Evo	(Australia) Marcos Flack	(Australia) Rylan Gray	(Australia) Bayley Hall	(France) Jean-Baptiste Simmenauer
Class A (GT3 Bronze) (10 entries)
9	(Australia) Hallmarc Racing Team MPC	Audi R8 LMS Evo II	(Australia) Marc Cini	(Australia) Dean Fiore	(Australia) Lee Holdsworth	
21	(Germany) Herberth Motorsport	Porsche 911 GT3 R (992)	(Germany) Ralf Bohn	(Germany) Alfred Renauer	(Germany) Robert Renauer	
27	(United States) Heart of Racing Team SPS	Mercedes-AMG GT3 Evo	(Brazil) Eduardo Barrichello	(Canada) Roman De Angelis	(United Kingdom) Ian James	
47	(Australia) Supabarn Supermarkets / Tigani Motorsport	Mercedes-AMG GT3 Evo	(Australia) Zach Bates	(Australia) James Koundouris	(Australia) Theo Koundouris	(Australia) David Russell
79	(San Marino) Tsunami RT	Porsche 911 GT3 R (992)	(Italy) Fabio Babini	(Switzerland) Alex Fontana	(Italy) Johannes Zelger	
86	(Denmark) High Class Racing	Porsche 911 GT3 R (992)	(France) Dorian Boccolacci	(Denmark) Anders Fjordbach	(China) Kerong Li	
89	(China) Team KRC	BMW M4 GT3 Evo	(Germany) Max Hesse	(Netherlands) Maxime Oosten	(China) Cunfan Ruan	
93	(Australia) Wall Racing	Lamborghini Huracán GT3 Evo 2	(Australia) Tony D'Alberto	(Italy) Marco Mapelli	(Australia) Adrian Deitz	(Australia) Grant Denyer
101	(Australia) Quinn Racing Team MPC	Audi R8 LMS Evo II	(Australia) Kent Quinn	(Australia) Klark Quinn	(Australia) Ryder Quinn	(Australia) Tony Quinn
193	(United Kingdom) Ziggo Sport Tempesta by ARGT	Ferrari 296 GT3	(United Kingdom) Chris Froggatt	(Hong Kong) Jonathan Hui	(Italy) Lorenzo Patrese	(New Zealand) Ryan Wood
Class A (GT3 Pro-Am) (5 entries)
14	(Australia) Volante Rosso Motorsport	Aston Martin Vantage AMR GT3	(Australia) Bryce Fullwood	(Australia) Damien Hamilton	(Indonesia) "Andrés Pato"	(France) Maxime Robin
44	(Australia) Geyer Valmont Racing / Tigani Motorsport	Mercedes-AMG GT3 Evo	(Australia) Scott Andrews	(New Zealand) Brendon Leitch	(Australia) Sergio Pires	(Australia) Marcel Zalloua
45	RAM Motorsport / GWR Australia	Mercedes-AMG GT3 Evo	(Australia) Brett Hobson	(Australia) Dylan O'Keeffe	(Australia) Garth Walden	
99	(Malaysia) Johor Motorsports Racing JMR	Chevrolet Corvette Z06 GT3.R	(United Kingdom) Ben Green	(Malaysia) Prince Abu Bakar Ibrahim	(Malaysia) Prince Jefri Ibrahim	(Australia) Jordan Love
268	(Australia) Team BRM	Audi R8 LMS Evo II	(New Zealand) Steve Brooks	(Australia) James Golding	(Australia) Alex Peroni	(Australia) Mark Rosser
Class C (GT4) (2 entries)
7	(New Zealand) Team NZ	Aston Martin Vantage AMR GT4	(New Zealand) Graeme Dowsett	(France) Romain Leroux	(New Zealand) Chris van der Drift	
42	(Australia) Method Motorsport	McLaren Artura GT4	(United States) Steven Aghakhani	(United Kingdom) Adrian Kunzle	(United States) Kevin Madsen	
Class I (Invitational) (2 entries)
50	(Australia) KTM Vantage Racing by GWR	KTM X-Bow GT2	(Australia) David Crampton	(Australia) Trent Harrison	(Australia) Glen Wood	
111	(Australia) 111 Racing	IRC GT	(Australia) Darren Currie	(Australia) Axle Donaldson	(Australia) Daniel Stutterd	

== Results ==
=== Practice ===
Session	Day	Fastest Lap					
Session	Day	No.	Driver	Team	Car	Time	Ref
Practice 1	Friday	32	(Belgium) Charles Weerts	(Belgium) Team WRT	BMW M4 GT3 Evo	2:03.869	
Practice 2 (Note: Session was for FIA Bronze categorised drivers only.)	Friday	45	(Australia) Brett Hobson	RAM Motorsport / GWR Australia	Mercedes-AMG GT3 Evo	2:05.318	
Practice 3	Friday	55	(Australia) Will Brown	(Australia) Jamec Racing Team MPC	Audi R8 LMS Evo II	2:03.899	
Practice 4	Friday	75	(Australia) Kenny Habul	(Australia) 75 Express	Mercedes-AMG GT3 Evo	2:04.906	
Practice 5	Saturday	55	(Germany) Christopher Haase	(Australia) Jamec Racing Team MPC	Audi R8 LMS Evo II	2:03.040	
Practice 6	Saturday	222	(Australia) Cameron Waters	(Australia) Scott Taylor Motorsport	Mercedes-AMG GT3 Evo	2:02.357	

=== Qualifying ===
Pos.	Class	No.	Driver	Team	Car	Time
1	P	222	(Australia) Cameron Waters	(Australia) Scott Taylor Motorsport	Mercedes-AMG GT3 Evo	2:01.5631
2	PA	44	(Australia) Scott Andrews	(Australia) Geyer Valmont Racing / Tigani Motorsport	Mercedes-AMG GT3 Evo	2:01.6706
3	P	64	(Australia) Broc Feeney	(Germany) HRT Ford Racing	Ford Mustang GT3	2:01.6875
4	P	75	(Germany) Luca Stolz	(Australia) 75 Express	Mercedes-AMG GT3 Evo	2:01.7565
5	P	6	(Australia) Jayden Ojeda	(Australia) Tigani Motorsport	Mercedes-AMG GT3 Evo	2:01.8066
6	P	55	(Germany) Christopher Haase	(Australia) Jamec Racing Team MPC	Audi R8 LMS Evo II	2:01.8804
7	P	46	(Switzerland) Raffaele Marciello	(Belgium) Team WRT	BMW M4 GT3 Evo	2:01.9631
8	P	77	(Austria) Lucas Auer	(Hong Kong) Mercedes-AMG Team Craft-Bamboo Racing	Mercedes-AMG GT3 Evo	2:01.9715
9	P	911	(Australia) Matt Campbell	(Hong Kong) Absolute Racing	Porsche 911 GT3 R (992)	2:01.9785
10	B	93	(Italy) Marco Mapelli	(Australia) Wall Racing	Lamborghini Huracán GT3 Evo 2	2:01.9902
11	B	89	(Germany) Max Hesse	(China) Team KRC	BMW M4 GT3 Evo	2:02.0234
12	P	32	(South Africa) Kelvin van der Linde	(Belgium) Team WRT	BMW M4 GT3 Evo	2:02.0361
13	B	9	(Australia) Lee Holdsworth	(Australia) Hallmarc Racing Team MPC	Audi R8 LMS GT3 Evo II	2:02.2429
14	B	101	(Australia) Ryder Quinn	(Australia) Quinn Racing Team MPC	Audi R8 LMS GT3 Evo II	2:02.2608
15	P	95	(Germany) Marvin Kirchhöfer	(United Kingdom) Optimum Motorsport	McLaren 720S GT3 Evo	2:02.4067
16	B	193	(New Zealand) Ryan Wood	(United Kingdom) Ziggo Sport Tempesta by ARGT	Ferrari 296 GT3	2:02.5246
17	PA	268	(Australia) Alex Peroni	(Australia) Team BRM	Audi R8 LMS GT3 Evo II	2:02.5478
18	P	26	(New Zealand) Jaxon Evans	(Australia) Arise Racing GT	Ferrari 296 GT3	2:02.5533
19	PA	45	(Australia) Dylan O'Keeffe	RAM Motorsport / GWR Australia	Mercedes-AMG GT3 Evo	2:02.7601
20	P	100	(Australia) Kai Allen	(Australia) Grove Racing	Mercedes-AMG GT3 Evo	2:02.7859
21	B	79	(Switzerland) Alex Fontana	(San Marino) Tsunami RT	Porsche 911 GT3 R (992)	2:02.8025
22	B	47	(Australia) David Russell	(Australia) Supabarn Supermarkets / Tigani Motorsports	Mercedes-AMG GT3 Evo	2:02.9686
23	P	77	(Austria) Lucas Auer	(Hong Kong) Mercedes-AMG Team Craft-Bamboo Racing	Mercedes-AMG GT3 Evo	2:03.0452
24	P	2	(New Zealand) Earl Bamber	(Malaysia) Johor Motorsports Racing JMR	Chevrolet Corvette Z06 GT3.R	2:03.0587
25	PA	99	(United Kingdom) Ben Green	(Malaysia) Johor Motorsports Racing JMR	Chevrolet Corvette Z06 GT3.R	2:03.1114
26	PA	14	(Australia) Bryce Fullwood	(Australia) Volante Rosso Motorsport	Aston Martin Vantage AMR GT3	2:03.1459
27	B	27	(Canada) Roman De Angelis	(United States) Heart of Racing Team SPS	Mercedes-AMG GT3 Evo	2:03.1776
28	S	15	(Australia) Marcos Flack	(Australia) Volante Rosso Motorsport	McLaren 720S GT3 Evo	2:04.1448
29	INV	50	(Australia) Glen Wood	(Australia) KTM Vantage Racing by GWR	KTM X-Bow GT2	2:05.7656
30	P	888	(Germany) Maro Engel	(Germany) Mercedes-AMG Team GMR	Mercedes-AMG GT3 Evo	2:06.3000
31	B	86	(France) Dorian Boccolacci	(Denmark) High Class Racing	Porsche 911 GT3 R (992)	2:06.6433
32	INV	111	(Australia) Darren Currie	(Australia) 111 Racing	IRC GT	2:07.5945
33	GT4	42	(United Kingdom) Adrian Kunzle	(Australia) Method Motorsport	McLaren Artura GT4	2:20.6429
34	P	61	(Germany) Laurin Heinrich	(New Zealand) EBM	Porsche 911 GT3 R (992)	Disqualified

=== Top 10 Shootout ===
Pos.	Class	No.	Driver	Team	Car	Time
1	P	222	(Australia) Cameron Waters	(Australia) Scott Taylor Motorsport	Mercedes-AMG GT3 Evo	2:01.0790
2	P	77	(Austria) Lucas Auer	(Hong Kong) Mercedes-AMG Team Craft-Bamboo Racing	Mercedes-AMG GT3 Evo	+0.1770
3	P	75	(Germany) Luca Stolz	(Australia) 75 Express	Mercedes-AMG GT3 Evo	+0.2154
4	P	911	(Australia) Matt Campbell	(Hong Kong) Absolute Racing	Porsche 911 GT3 R (992)	+0.2308
5	P	55	(Germany) Christopher Haase	(Australia) Jamec Racing Team MPC	Audi R8 LMS Evo II	+0.4645
6	B	93	(Italy) Marco Mapelli	(Australia) Wall Racing	Lamborghini Huracán GT3 Evo 2	+0.6706
7	P	46	(Switzerland) Raffaele Marciello	(Belgium) Team WRT	BMW M4 GT3 Evo	+0.7942
8	PA	44	(Australia) Scott Andrews	(Australia) Geyer Valmont Racing / Tigani Motorsport	Mercedes-AMG GT3 Evo	+0.8512
9	P	64	(Australia) Broc Feeney	(Germany) HRT Ford Racing	Ford Mustang GT3	+0.8703
10	P	6	(Australia) Jayden Ojeda	(Australia) Tigani Motorsport	Mercedes-AMG GT3 Evo	+1.0444

=== Race ===
Class winners indicated in bold and with ‡.

Pos.	Class	No.	Team	Drivers	Car	Laps	Time/Retired
Pos.	Class	No.	Team	Drivers	Engine	Laps	Time/Retired
1	P	**888**	**(Hong Kong) Mercedes-AMG Team GMR**	**(Germany) Maro Engel** **(Canada) Mikaël Grenier** **(Belgium) Maxime Martin**	**Mercedes-AMG GT3 Evo**	**262**	**12:01:39.8777‡**
1	P	**888**	**(Hong Kong) Mercedes-AMG Team GMR**	**(Germany) Maro Engel** **(Canada) Mikaël Grenier** **(Belgium) Maxime Martin**	**Mercedes-AMG M159 6.2 L V8**	**262**	**12:01:39.8777‡**
2	B	**86**	**(Denmark) High Class Racing**	**(France) Dorian Boccolacci** **(Denmark) Anders Fjordbach** **(China) Kerong Li**	**Porsche 911 GT3 R (992)**	**262**	**+1.0368‡**
2	B	**86**	**(Denmark) High Class Racing**	**(France) Dorian Boccolacci** **(Denmark) Anders Fjordbach** **(China) Kerong Li**	**Porsche M97/80 4.2 L Flat-6**	**262**	**+1.0368‡**
3	P	46	(Belgium) Team WRT	(Brazil) Augusto Farfus (Switzerland) Raffaele Marciello (Italy) Valentino Rossi	BMW M4 GT3 Evo	262	+6.8770
3	P	46	(Belgium) Team WRT	(Brazil) Augusto Farfus (Switzerland) Raffaele Marciello (Italy) Valentino Rossi	BMW P58 3.0 L Turbo I6	262	+6.8770
4	P	55	(Australia) Jamec Racing Team MPC	(Australia) Will Brown (Germany) Christopher Haase (Australia) Brad Schumacher	Audi R8 LMS Evo II	262	+7.8715
4	P	55	(Australia) Jamec Racing Team MPC	(Australia) Will Brown (Germany) Christopher Haase (Australia) Brad Schumacher	Audi DAR 5.2 L V10	262	+7.8715
5	B	89	(China) Team KRC	(Germany) Max Hesse (Netherlands) Maxime Oosten (China) Cunfan Ruan	BMW M4 GT3 Evo	262	+8.4578
5	B	89	(China) Team KRC	(Germany) Max Hesse (Netherlands) Maxime Oosten (China) Cunfan Ruan	BMW P58 3.0 L Turbo I6	262	+8.4578
6	P	911	(Hong Kong) Absolute Racing	(Denmark) Bastian Buus (Australia) Matt Campbell (Belgium) Alessio Picariello	Porsche 911 GT3 R (992)	262	+10.7490
6	P	911	(Hong Kong) Absolute Racing	(Denmark) Bastian Buus (Australia) Matt Campbell (Belgium) Alessio Picariello	Porsche M97/80 4.2 L Flat-6	262	+10.7490
7	P	75	(Australia) 75 Express	(Andorra) Jules Gounon (Australia) Kenny Habul (Germany) Luca Stolz	Mercedes-AMG GT3 Evo	262	+27.1289
7	P	75	(Australia) 75 Express	(Andorra) Jules Gounon (Australia) Kenny Habul (Germany) Luca Stolz	Mercedes-AMG M159 6.2 L V8	262	+27.1289
8	P	61	(New Zealand) EBM	(Austria) Klaus Bachler (Switzerland) Ricardo Feller (Germany) Laurin Heinrich	Porsche 911 GT3 R (992)	262	+27.8558
8	P	61	(New Zealand) EBM	(Austria) Klaus Bachler (Switzerland) Ricardo Feller (Germany) Laurin Heinrich	Porsche M97/80 4.2 L Flat-6	262	+27.8558
9	P	26	(Australia) Arise Racing GT	(New Zealand) Jaxon Evans (Italy) Davide Rigon (Brazil) Daniel Serra	Ferrari 296 GT3	262	+28.2423
9	P	26	(Australia) Arise Racing GT	(New Zealand) Jaxon Evans (Italy) Davide Rigon (Brazil) Daniel Serra	Ferrari F163CE 3.0 L Turbo V6	262	+28.2423
10	B	193	(United Kingdom) Ziggo Sport Tempesta by ARGT	(United Kingdom) Chris Froggatt (Hong Kong) Jonathan Hui (Italy) Lorenzo Patrese (New Zealand) Ryan Wood	Ferrari 296 GT3	262	+36.1918
10	B	193	(United Kingdom) Ziggo Sport Tempesta by ARGT	(United Kingdom) Chris Froggatt (Hong Kong) Jonathan Hui (Italy) Lorenzo Patrese (New Zealand) Ryan Wood	Ferrari F163CE 3.0 L Turbo V6	262	+36.1918
11	B	21	(Germany) Herberth Motorsport	(Germany) Ralf Bohn (Germany) Alfred Renauer (Germany) Robert Renauer	Porsche 911 GT3 R (992)	262	+36.5173
11	B	21	(Germany) Herberth Motorsport	(Germany) Ralf Bohn (Germany) Alfred Renauer (Germany) Robert Renauer	Porsche M97/80 4.2 L Flat-6	262	+36.5173
12	P	32	(Belgium) Team WRT	(South Africa) Jordan Pepper (South Africa) Kelvin van der Linde (Belgium) Charles Weerts	BMW M4 GT3 Evo	262	+1:05.7219
12	P	32	(Belgium) Team WRT	(South Africa) Jordan Pepper (South Africa) Kelvin van der Linde (Belgium) Charles Weerts	BMW P58 3.0 L Turbo I6	262	+1:05.7219
13	PA	**45**	**RAM Motorsport / GWR Australia**	**(Australia) Brett Hobson** **(Australia) Dylan O'Keeffe** **(Australia) Garth Walden**	**Mercedes-AMG GT3 Evo**	**262**	**+1:09.4783‡**
13	PA	**45**	**RAM Motorsport / GWR Australia**	**(Australia) Brett Hobson** **(Australia) Dylan O'Keeffe** **(Australia) Garth Walden**	**Mercedes-AMG M159 6.2 L V8**	**262**	**+1:09.4783‡**
14	PA	99	(Malaysia) Johor Motorsports Racing JMR	(United Kingdom) Ben Green (Malaysia) Prince Abu Bakar Ibrahim (Malaysia) Prince Jefri Ibrahim (Australia) Jordan Love	Chevrolet Corvette Z06 GT3.R	261	+1 lap
14	PA	99	(Malaysia) Johor Motorsports Racing JMR	(United Kingdom) Ben Green (Malaysia) Prince Abu Bakar Ibrahim (Malaysia) Prince Jefri Ibrahim (Australia) Jordan Love	Chevrolet LT6.R 5.5 L V8	261	+1 lap
15	B	93	(Australia) Wall Racing	(Australia) Tony D'Alberto (Australia) Adrian Deitz (Australia) Grant Denyer (Italy) Marco Mapelli	Lamborghini Huracán GT3 Evo 2	260	+2 laps
15	B	93	(Australia) Wall Racing	(Australia) Tony D'Alberto (Australia) Adrian Deitz (Australia) Grant Denyer (Italy) Marco Mapelli	Lamborghini DGF 5.2 L V10	260	+2 laps
16	B	9	(Australia) Hallmarc Racing Team MPC	(Australia) Marc Cini (Australia) Dean Fiore (Australia) Lee Holdsworth	Audi R8 LMS Evo II	260	+2 laps
16	B	9	(Australia) Hallmarc Racing Team MPC	(Australia) Marc Cini (Australia) Dean Fiore (Australia) Lee Holdsworth	Audi DAR 5.2 L V10	260	+2 laps
17	B	27	(United States) Heart of Racing Team SPS	(Brazil) Eduardo Barrichello (Canada) Roman De Angelis (United Kingdom) Ian James	Mercedes-AMG GT3 Evo	254	+8 laps
17	B	27	(United States) Heart of Racing Team SPS	(Brazil) Eduardo Barrichello (Canada) Roman De Angelis (United Kingdom) Ian James	Mercedes-AMG M159 6.2 L V8	254	+8 laps
18	B	101	(Australia) Quinn Racing Team MPC	(Australia) Kent Quinn (Australia) Klark Quinn (Australia) Ryder Quinn (Australia) Tony Quinn	Audi R8 LMS Evo II	254	+8 laps
18	B	101	(Australia) Quinn Racing Team MPC	(Australia) Kent Quinn (Australia) Klark Quinn (Australia) Ryder Quinn (Australia) Tony Quinn	Audi DAR 5.2 L V10	254	+8 laps
19	PA	14	(Australia) Volante Rosso Motorsport	(Australia) Bryce Fullwood (Australia) Damien Hamilton (Indonesia) "Andrés Pato" (France) Maxime Robin	Aston Martin Vantage AMR GT3	252	+10 laps
19	PA	14	(Australia) Volante Rosso Motorsport	(Australia) Bryce Fullwood (Australia) Damien Hamilton (Indonesia) "Andrés Pato" (France) Maxime Robin	Aston Martin M177 4.0 L Turbo V8	252	+10 laps
20	PA	44	(Australia) Geyer Valmont Racing / Tigani Motorsport	(Australia) Scott Andrews (New Zealand) Brendon Leitch (Australia) Sergio Pires (Australia) Marcel Zalloua	Mercedes-AMG GT3 Evo	250	+12 laps
20	PA	44	(Australia) Geyer Valmont Racing / Tigani Motorsport	(Australia) Scott Andrews (New Zealand) Brendon Leitch (Australia) Sergio Pires (Australia) Marcel Zalloua	Mercedes-AMG M159 6.2 L V8	250	+12 laps
21	B	47	(Australia) Tigani Motorsport	(Australia) Zach Bates (Australia) James Koundouris (Australia) Theo Koundouris (Australia) David Russell	Mercedes-AMG GT3 Evo	249	+13 laps
21	B	47	(Australia) Tigani Motorsport	(Australia) Zach Bates (Australia) James Koundouris (Australia) Theo Koundouris (Australia) David Russell	Mercedes-AMG M159 6.2 L V8	249	+13 laps
22	INV	**111**	**(Australia) 111 Racing**	**(Australia) Darren Currie** **(Australia) Axle Donaldson** **(Australia) Daniel Stutterd**	**IRC GT**	**236**	**+26 laps‡**
22	INV	**111**	**(Australia) 111 Racing**	**(Australia) Darren Currie** **(Australia) Axle Donaldson** **(Australia) Daniel Stutterd**	**GM LS3 6.2 L V8**	**236**	**+26 laps‡**
23	GT4	**42**	**(Australia) Method Motorsport**	**(United States) Steven Aghakhani** **(United Kingdom) Adrian Kunzle** **(United States) Kevin Madsen**	**McLaren Artura GT4**	**235**	**+27 laps‡**
23	GT4	**42**	**(Australia) Method Motorsport**	**(United States) Steven Aghakhani** **(United Kingdom) Adrian Kunzle** **(United States) Kevin Madsen**	**McLaren M630 3.0 L Turbo V6**	**235**	**+27 laps‡**
24	P	100	(Australia) Grove Racing	(Australia) Kai Allen (Australia) Will Davison (Australia) Brenton Grove	Mercedes-AMG GT3 Evo	230	+32 laps
24	P	100	(Australia) Grove Racing	(Australia) Kai Allen (Australia) Will Davison (Australia) Brenton Grove	Mercedes-AMG M159 6.2 L V8	230	+32 laps
DNF	P	95	(United Kingdom) Optimum Motorsport	(United Kingdom) Ben Barnicoat (Germany) Marvin Kirchhöfer (Australia) Garnet Patterson	McLaren 720S GT3 Evo	245	Electrical
DNF	P	95	(United Kingdom) Optimum Motorsport	(United Kingdom) Ben Barnicoat (Germany) Marvin Kirchhöfer (Australia) Garnet Patterson	McLaren M840T 4.0 L Turbo V8	245	Electrical
DNF	P	6	(Australia) Mercedes-AMG Team Tigani Motorsport	(Switzerland) Philip Ellis (Australia) Jayden Ojeda (Germany) Fabian Schiller	Mercedes-AMG GT3 Evo	238	Accident
DNF	P	6	(Australia) Mercedes-AMG Team Tigani Motorsport	(Switzerland) Philip Ellis (Australia) Jayden Ojeda (Germany) Fabian Schiller	Mercedes-AMG M159 6.2 L V8	238	Accident
DNF	P	222	(Australia) Scott Taylor Motorsport	(Australia) Chaz Mostert (Australia) Thomas Randle (Australia) Cameron Waters	Mercedes-AMG GT3 Evo	238	Accident
DNF	P	222	(Australia) Scott Taylor Motorsport	(Australia) Chaz Mostert (Australia) Thomas Randle (Australia) Cameron Waters	Mercedes-AMG M159 6.2 L V8	238	Accident
DNF	P	2	(Malaysia) Johor Motorsports Racing JMR	(New Zealand) Earl Bamber (Netherlands) Nicky Catsburg (United Kingdom) Alexander Sims	Chevrolet Corvette Z06 GT3.R	223	Suspension
DNF	P	2	(Malaysia) Johor Motorsports Racing JMR	(New Zealand) Earl Bamber (Netherlands) Nicky Catsburg (United Kingdom) Alexander Sims	Chevrolet LT6.R 5.5 L V8	223	Suspension
DNF	P	77	(Hong Kong) Mercedes-AMG Team Craft-Bamboo Racing	(Estonia) Ralf Aron (Austria) Lucas Auer (Germany) Maximilian Götz	Mercedes-AMG GT3 Evo	195	Accident
DNF	P	77	(Hong Kong) Mercedes-AMG Team Craft-Bamboo Racing	(Estonia) Ralf Aron (Austria) Lucas Auer (Germany) Maximilian Götz	Mercedes-AMG M159 6.2 L V8	195	Accident
DNF	B	79	(San Marino) Tsunami RT	(Italy) Fabio Babini (Switzerland) Alex Fontana (Italy) Johannes Zelger	Porsche 911 GT3 R (992)	192	Accident
DNF	B	79	(San Marino) Tsunami RT	(Italy) Fabio Babini (Switzerland) Alex Fontana (Italy) Johannes Zelger	Porsche M97/80 4.2 L Flat-6	192	Accident
DNF	PA	268	(Australia) Team BRM	(New Zealand) Steve Brooks (Australia) James Golding (Australia) Alex Peroni (Australia) Mark Rosser	Audi R8 LMS Evo II	148	Accident
DNF	PA	268	(Australia) Team BRM	(New Zealand) Steve Brooks (Australia) James Golding (Australia) Alex Peroni (Australia) Mark Rosser	Audi DAR 5.2 L V10	148	Accident
DNF	S	15	(Australia) Volante Rosso Motorsport	(Australia) Marcos Flack (Australia) Rylan Gray (Australia) Bayley Hall (France) Jean-Baptiste Simmenauer	McLaren 720S GT3 Evo	130	Accident
DNF	S	15	(Australia) Volante Rosso Motorsport	(Australia) Marcos Flack (Australia) Rylan Gray (Australia) Bayley Hall (France) Jean-Baptiste Simmenauer	McLaren M840T 4.0 L Turbo V8	130	Accident
DNF	INV	50	(Australia) KTM Vantage Racing by GWR	(Australia) David Crampton (Australia) Trent Harrison (Australia) Glen Wood	KTM X-Bow GT2	6	Throttle
DNF	INV	50	(Australia) KTM Vantage Racing by GWR	(Australia) David Crampton (Australia) Trent Harrison (Australia) Glen Wood	Audi TFSI 2.5 L Turbo I5	6	Throttle
DNF	P	64	(Germany) HRT Ford Racing	(Australia) Broc Feeney (Germany) Christopher Mies (Norway) Dennis Olsen	Ford Mustang GT3	3	Hit Kangaroo
DNF	P	64	(Germany) HRT Ford Racing	(Australia) Broc Feeney (Germany) Christopher Mies (Norway) Dennis Olsen	Ford Coyote 5.4 L V8	3	Hit Kangaroo
DNS	GT4	7	(New Zealand) Team NZ	(New Zealand) Graeme Dowsett (France) Romain Leroux (New Zealand) Chris van der Drift	Aston Martin Vantage AMR GT4		Crash in Practice 4
DNS	GT4	7	(New Zealand) Team NZ	(New Zealand) Graeme Dowsett (France) Romain Leroux (New Zealand) Chris van der Drift	Aston Martin M177 4.0 L Turbo V8		Crash in Practice 4

- Fastest race lap: 2:02.3071 – Nicky Catsburg on lap 204

== Notes ==
Intercontinental GT Challenge
Previous race: none	2026 season	Next race: 2026 24 Hours of Nürburgring
