= 2026 GT America Series =

Racing Series

The 2026 GT America Series was the sixth season of the SRO Motorsports Group's GT America Series, an auto racing series for grand tourer cars. The races were contested with GT2-spec, GT3-spec, GT4-spec, and new for this year, GT Cup-spec cars. The season began on March 27 at Sonoma Raceway and finished on October 11 at Indianapolis.

== Calendar ==
The initial calendar was revealed during the 2025 24 Hours of Spa featuring seven rounds, with the final completed calendar revealed during the sixth round of the season at Road America. However on September 19, 2025, it was announced that the round at Sebring International Raceway was shifted one week earlier.

Round	Circuit	Date	Supporting
1	Sonoma Raceway, Sonoma, California	March 27–29	GT World Challenge America
2	Circuit of the Americas, Austin, Texas	April 24–26	GT World Challenge America
3	Sebring International Raceway, Sebring, Florida	May 8–10	GT World Challenge America
4	(Georgia (U.S. state)) Road Atlanta, Braselton, Georgia	June 12–14	GT World Challenge America
5	Road America, Elkhart Lake, Wisconsin	August 28–30	GT World Challenge America
6	Barber Motorsports Park, Birmingham, Alabama	September 25–27	GT World Challenge America
7	Indianapolis Motor Speedway, Indianapolis, Indiana	October 8–11	Intercontinental GT Challenge; GT World Challenge America

== Series news ==
For 2026, GT America will add a GT Cup class, for cars such as the Porsche 911 GT3 Cup (992), Lamborghini Huracán Super Trofeo Evo 2, McLaren Artura Trophy and Ferrari 296 Challenge. On 16 October 2025, it was announced that GT America will add a Ginetta class, dedicated for the new Ginetta G56 GTP8.

== Entry list ==
Team	Car	No.	Drivers	Class		Rounds
Team	Car	No.	Drivers	Car	Driver	Rounds
GT3
(United States) HP TECH Motorsport	Ferrari 296 GT3	004	(United States) Tony Davis	GT3	GT	1
(United States) HP TECH Motorsport	Ferrari 296 GT3	04	(United States) Tony Davis	GT3	GT	5
(United States) HP TECH Motorsport	Ferrari 296 GT3 Evo	04	(United States) Tony Davis	GT3	GT	2–4
(Canada) R. Ferri Motorsports	Ferrari 296 GT3	013	(Canada) Marc Muzzo	GT3	GT	1–5
(United States) Kellymoss	Porsche 911 GT3 R (992) 1–2; Porsche 911 GT3 R (992.2) 3–5	017	(United States) Michael Clark	GT3	GT	1–5
(United States) Kellymoss	Porsche 911 GT3 R (992) 1–2; Porsche 911 GT3 R (992.2) 3–5	13	(United States) Todd Pariot	GT3	GT	1–5
(United States) Kellymoss	Porsche 911 GT3 R (992) 1–2; Porsche 911 GT3 R (992.2) 3–5	88	(United States) John Gilliland	GT3	GT	1–5
(United States) Dollahite Racing	Ford Mustang GT3	4	(United States) Scott Dollahite	GT3	GT	TBA
(Italy) AF Corse USA	Ferrari 296 GT3	16	(United States) Rodin Younessi	GT3	GT	1–5
(United States) RS1	Porsche 911 GT3 R (992.2)	19	(Mexico) Joel Cortes	GT3	GT	1–2
(United States) RS1	Porsche 911 GT3 R (992)	19	(Mexico) Joel Cortes	GT3	GT	4
(United States) Scuderia Corsa	Ferrari 296 GT3 Evo	23	(United States) Thor Haugen	GT3	GT	1–2
(Canada) Ferraro Motorsports	Ferrari 296 GT3	26	(Canada) Tony Ferraro	GT3	GT	2–3, 5
(United States) GMG Racing	Porsche 911 GT3 R (992.2)	32	(United States) Kyle Washington	GT3	GT	1–5
(United States) Ruckus Racing	Porsche 911 GT3 R (992.2)	45	(United States) Scott Blind	GT3	GT	1–5
(United States) Chouest Povoledo Racing	Chevrolet Corvette Z06 GT3.R	50	(United States) Ross Chouest	GT3	GT	1–3, 5
(United States) SKI Autosports	Audi R8 LMS Evo II	56	(Mexico) Memo Gidley	GT3	GT	1–5
(United States) Random Vandals Racing	Mercedes-AMG GT3 Evo	58	(United States) CJ Moses	GT3	GT	2, 4–5
(Germany) Mishumotors	Callaway Corvette C7 GT3-R	70	(Germany) Mirco Schultis	GT3	GT	1, 3, 5
(United States) Wright Motorsports	Porsche 911 GT3 R (992.2)	72	(United States) Dave Musial Sr.	GT3	GT	1–5
(United States) Wright Motorsports	Porsche 911 GT3 R (992.2)	216	(Canada) Jon Manship	GT3	GT	2
(United States) Wright Motorsports	Porsche 911 GT3 R (992)	216	(Canada) Jon Manship	GT3	GT	3–4
(United States) Lone Star Racing	Mercedes-AMG GT3 Evo	80	(United States) Dan Knox	GT3	GT	2
(United States) One11 Competition	Ferrari 296 GT3	115	(United States) Jason McCarthy	GT3	GT	2
GT2
(United States) Lone Star Racing	Mercedes-AMG GT2	10	(United States) Dan Knox	GT2	GT	TBA
(United States) Dollahite Racing	Ginetta G56 GT2	62	(United Kingdom) Lawrence Tomlinson	GT2	GT	3
(United Kingdom) Team LNT	Ginetta G56 GT2	62	(United Kingdom) Lawrence Tomlinson	GT2	GT	4–5
GT Cup
(United States) Gotham Motorsports	Ferrari 488 Challenge Evo	3	(United States) Yousuf Nabi	Cup	CP	1
(United States) Gotham Motorsports	Ferrari 488 Challenge Evo	270	(United States) Radu Muntean	Cup	CP	1
(United States) 5.2 Motorsports	Ginetta G56 GTP8	8	(United States) Corey Deeds	Cup	CP	3
(United States) RacingSupport	Ginetta G56 GTP8	89	(United States) David Lecko	Cup	CP	1–5
(United States) RacingSupport	Ginetta G56 GTP8	TBA	TBA	Cup	CP	TBA
GT4
(United States) Racers Edge Motorsports	Aston Martin Vantage AMR GT4 Evo	2	(United States) Jason Bell	GT4	GT	3–4
(United States) RCX Motorsport	Porsche 718 Cayman GT4 RS Clubsport	83	(Hungary) Jozsef Petkes	GT4	GT	2
(United States) Flying Lizard Motorsports	BMW M4 GT4 Evo (G82)	413	(United States) Craig Lumsden	GT4	GT	4
(United States) Flying Lizard Motorsports	BMW M4 GT4 Evo (G82)	610	(United States) Craig Lumsden	GT4	GT	1–3, 5

Icon	Class
Car
GT2	GT2 Cars
GT3	GT3 Current-Gen Cars
GT3	GT3 Previous-Gen Cars
GT4	GT4 Cars
Cup	GT Cup Cars
GTA	Ginetta Cars
Drivers
GT	SRO3
GT	GT2
GT	GT4
CP	GT Cup
GT	GTA
INV	Invitational

== Race results ==
Bold indicates overall winner

Round		Circuit	Pole position	SRO3 Winners	GT2 Winners	GT Cup Winners	GT4 Winners	Results
1	R1	(California) Sonoma	(United States) #56 SKI Autosports	(United States) #56 SKI Autosports	No entries	(United States) #89 RacingSupport	(United States) #610 Flying Lizard Motorsports	Report
1	R1	(California) Sonoma	(Mexico) Memo Gidley	(Mexico) Memo Gidley	No entries	(United States) David Lecko	(United States) Craig Lumsden	Report
1	R2	(California) Sonoma	(United States) #56 SKI Autosports	(United States) #56 SKI Autosports	No entries	(United States) #89 RacingSupport	(United States) #610 Flying Lizard Motorsports	Report
1	R2	(California) Sonoma	(Mexico) Memo Gidley	(Mexico) Memo Gidley	No entries	(United States) David Lecko	(United States) Craig Lumsden	Report
2	R1	(Texas) COTA	(United States) #04 HP TECH Motorsport	(United States) #56 SKI Autosports	No entries	(United States) #89 RacingSupport	(United States) #83 RCX Motorsport	Report
2	R1	(Texas) COTA	(United States) Tony Davis	(Mexico) Memo Gidley	No entries	(United States) David Lecko	(Hungary) Jozsef Petkes	Report
2	R2	(Texas) COTA	(United States) #56 SKI Autosports	(United States) #56 SKI Autosports	No entries	(United States) #89 RacingSupport	(United States) #83 RCX Motorsport	Report
2	R2	(Texas) COTA	(Mexico) Memo Gidley	(Mexico) Memo Gidley	No entries	(United States) David Lecko	(Hungary) Jozsef Petkes	Report
3	R1	(Florida) Sebring	(United States) #04 HP TECH Motorsport	(United States) #04 HP TECH Motorsport	(United States) #62 Dollahite Racing	(United States) #89 RacingSupport	(United States) #2 Racers Edge Motorsports	Report
3	R1	(Florida) Sebring	(United States) Tony Davis	(United States) Tony Davis	(United Kingdom) Lawrence Tomlinson	(United States) David Lecko	(United States) Jason Bell	Report
3	R2	(Florida) Sebring	(United States) #32 GMG Racing	(United States) #56 SKI Autosports	(United States) #62 Dollahite Racing	(United States) #89 RacingSupport	(United States) #2 Racers Edge Motorsports	Report
3	R2	(Florida) Sebring	(United States) Kyle Washington	(Mexico) Memo Gidley	(United Kingdom) Lawrence Tomlinson	(United States) David Lecko	(United States) Jason Bell	Report
4	R1	(Georgia (U.S. state)) Road Atlanta	(United States) #56 SKI Autosports	(United States) #56 SKI Autosports	(United Kingdom) #62 Team LNT	(United States) #89 RacingSupport	(United States) #2 Racers Edge Motorsports	Report
4	R1	(Georgia (U.S. state)) Road Atlanta	(Mexico) Memo Gidley	(Mexico) Memo Gidley	(United Kingdom) Lawrence Tomlinson	(United States) David Lecko	(United States) Jason Bell	Report
4	R2	(Georgia (U.S. state)) Road Atlanta	(United States) #56 SKI Autosports	(United States) #56 SKI Autosports	(United Kingdom) #62 Team LNT	(United States) #89 RacingSupport	(United States) #2 Racers Edge Motorsports	Report
4	R2	(Georgia (U.S. state)) Road Atlanta	(Mexico) Memo Gidley	(Mexico) Memo Gidley	(United Kingdom) Lawrence Tomlinson	(United States) David Lecko	(United States) Jason Bell	Report
5	R1	(Wisconsin) Road America	(United States) #56 SKI Autosports	(United States) #56 SKI Autosports	(United Kingdom) #62 Team LNT	(United States) #89 RacingSupport	(United States) #610 Flying Lizard Motorsports	Report
5	R1	(Wisconsin) Road America	(Mexico) Memo Gidley	(Mexico) Memo Gidley	(United Kingdom) Lawrence Tomlinson	(United States) David Lecko	(United States) Craig Lumsden	Report
5	R2	(Wisconsin) Road America	(United States) #56 SKI Autosports	(United States) #56 SKI Autosports	(United Kingdom) #62 Team LNT	(United States) #89 RacingSupport	(United States) #610 Flying Lizard Motorsports	Report
5	R2	(Wisconsin) Road America	(Mexico) Memo Gidley	(Mexico) Memo Gidley	(United Kingdom) Lawrence Tomlinson	(United States) David Lecko	(United States) Craig Lumsden	Report
6	R1	(Alabama) Barber						
6	R2	(Alabama) Barber						
7	R1	(Indiana) Indianapolis						
7	R2	(Indiana) Indianapolis						

== Championship Standings ==
Scoring System

Championship points are awarded for the first ten positions in each race. Entries are required to complete 75% of the winning car's race distance in order to be classified and earn points.

Position	**1st**	**2nd**	**3rd**	**4th**	**5th**	**6th**	**7th**	**8th**	**9th**	**10th**
Points	25	18	15	12	10	8	6	4	2	1

=== Drivers' Championships ===
Pos.	Driver	Team	1		2		3		4		5		6		7		Points
Pos.	Driver	Team	(California) SON		(Texas) AUS		(Florida) SEB		(Georgia (U.S. state)) ATL		(Wisconsin) ELK		(Alabama) BAR		(Indiana) IND		Points
Pos.	Driver	Team	R1	R2	R1	R2	R1	R2	R1	R2	R1	R2	R1	R2	R1	R2	Points
SRO3
1	(Mexico) Memo Gidley	(United States) SKI Autosports	**1**	**1**	1	**1**	2	1	**1**	**1**	**1**	**1**					243
2	(United States) Tony Davis	(United States) HP TECH Motorsport	6	8	**2**	4	**1**	3	2	2	2	3					151
3	(United States) Kyle Washington	(United States) GMG Racing	5	2	9	2	3	**2**	5	4	4	9					117
4	(United States) Scott Blind	(United States) Ruckus Racing	3	7	4	10	6	6	4	5	3	4					99
5	(Canada) Marc Muzzo	(Canada) R. Ferri Motorsports	2	6	7	8	5	4	3	6	6	6					97
6	(United States) Ross Chouest	(United States) Chouest Povoledo Racing	4	9	3	5	4	5			5	2					89
7	(United States) Dave Musial Sr.	(United States) Wright Motorsports	7	3	11	9	7	8	8	7	8	7					53
8	(Mexico) Joel Cortes	(United States) RS1	10	4	8	7			6	3							46
9	(Germany) Mirco Schultis	(Germany) Mishumotors	9	5			10	7			7	5					35
10	(United States) Jason McCarthy	(United States) One11 Competition			5	3											25
11	(United States) Dan Knox	(United States) Lone Star Racing			6	6											16
12	(Canada) Jon Manship	(United States) Wright Motorsports			10	12	8	DNS	7	8							15
13	(Canada) Tony Ferraro	(Canada) Ferraro Motorsports			13	13					9	8					6
14	(United States) Thor Haugen	(United States) Scuderia Corsa	8	DNS	12	11											4
15	(United States) Rodin Younessi	(Italy) AF Corse USA	DNS	DNS	14	15	9	9									4
16	(United States) CJ Moses	(United States) Random Vandals Racing			15	14			9	9							4
17	(United States) John Gilliland	(United States) Kellymoss	DNS	DNS	DNS	DNS	DNS	DNS	DNS	DNS							0
17	(United States) Michael Clark	(United States) Kellymoss	DNS	DNS	DNS	DNS	DNS	DNS	DNS	DNS							0
17	(United States) Todd Pariot	(United States) Kellymoss	DNS	DNS	DNS	DNS	DNS	DNS	DNS	DNS							0
GT2
1	(United Kingdom) Lawrence Tomlinson	(United States) Dollahite Racing					**1**	**1**									150
1	(United Kingdom) Lawrence Tomlinson	(United Kingdom) Team LNT							**1**	**1**	**1**	**1**					150
GT4
1	(United States) Craig Lumsden	(United States) Flying Lizard Motorsports	**1**	**1**	2	2	2	2	2	2	**1**	**1**					208
2	(United States) Jason Bell	(United States) Racers Edge Motorsports					**1**	**1**	**1**	**1**							100
3	(Hungary) Jozsef Petkes	(United States) RCX Motorsport			**1**	**1**											50
GT Cup
1	(United States) David Lecko	(United States) RacingSupport	**1**	**1**	**1**	**1**	**1**	**1**	**1**	**1**	**1**	**1**					250
2	(United States) Yousuf Nabi	(United States) Gotham Motorsports	2	2													36
3	(United States) Corey Deeds	(United States) 5.2 Motorsports					2	2									36
4	(United States) Radu Muntean	(United States) Gotham Motorsports	DNS	DNS													0
Pos.	Driver	Team	(California) SON		(Texas) AUS		(Florida) SEB		(Georgia (U.S. state)) ATL		(Wisconsin) ELK		(Alabama) BAR		(Indiana) IND		Points

Key
Colour	Result
Gold	Race winner
Silver	2nd place
Bronze	3rd place
Green	Points finish
Blue	Non-points finish
Blue	Non-classified finish (NC)
Purple	Did not finish (Ret)
Black	Disqualified (DSQ)
Black	Excluded (EX)
White	Did not start (DNS)
White	Race cancelled (C)
White	Withdrew (WD)
Blank	Did not participate

**Bold** – Pole
Italics – Fastest Lap

Notes

- † – Drivers did not finish the race but were classified, as they completed more than 75% of the race distance.
- ‡ – Post-event penalty. Car moved to back of class.
