= Chevrolet Corvette Z06 GT3.R =

Grand tourer racing car

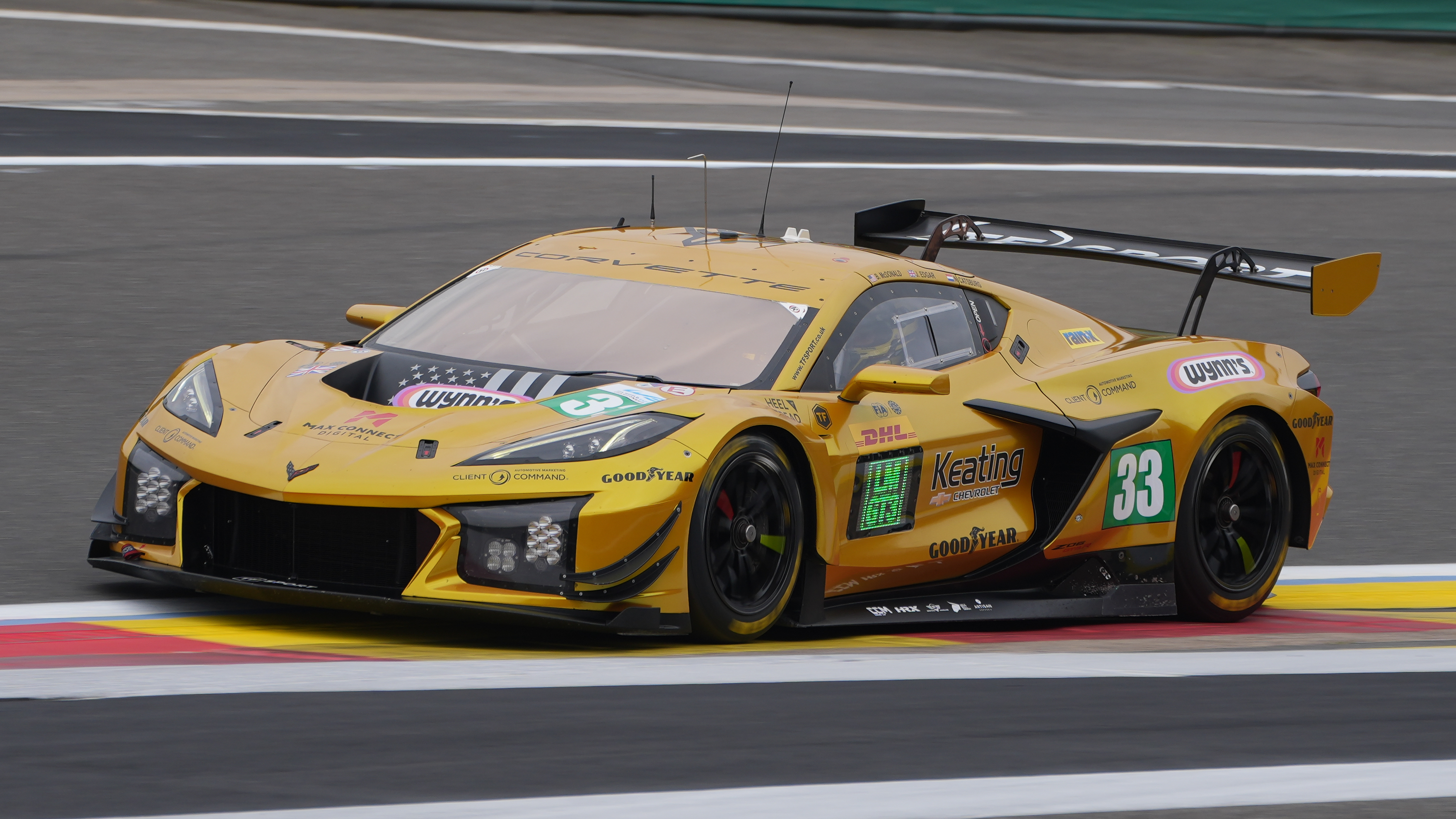
- The No. 33 Corvette Z06 GT3.R of TF Sport being driven at the 2026 6 Hours of Spa-Francorchamps
- Category: Group GT3
- Constructor: (United States) Chevrolet (Pratt & Miller)
- Designer: Vlad Kapitonov
- Predecessor: Chevrolet Corvette C8.R; Callaway Corvette C7 GT3-R

Technical specifications
- Chassis: Aluminum monocoque
- Suspension: Double wishbone suspension
- Length: 182.3 in (4,630 mm)
- Width: 80.7 in (2,050 mm)
- Height: 45.2 in (1,148 mm)
- Wheelbase: 107.2 in (2,723 mm)
- Engine: Chevrolet LT6.R 5.5 L (336 cu in) 90° V8 naturally aspirated, mid-engine, flat-plane crank, longitudinally mounted
- Transmission: Xtrac P529 6-speed sequential manual
- Power: WEC: 500 hp (373 kW) @ 7,400 rpm IMSA: 600 hp (447 kW) @ 7,400 rpm 460 lb⋅ft (620 N⋅m) (Both)
- Weight: 1,239.67 kilograms (2,733.0 lb)
- Fuel: TotalEnergies (WEC); VP Racing Fuels (IMSA)
- Lubricants: Various
- Tires: Michelin (IMSA); Goodyear (WEC)

Competition history
- Notable entrants: (United States) Corvette Racing by Pratt Miller Motorsports (United Kingdom) TF Sport (Canada) AWA (United States) DXDT Racing
- Notable drivers: (Spain) Antonio García (United States) Tommy Milner (Netherlands) Nicky Catsburg (United Kingdom) Alexander Sims
- Debut: 2024 24 Hours of Daytona
- First win: 2024 Chevrolet Grand Prix
- Last win: 2026 24 Hours of Le Mans
- Last event: 2026 24 Hours of Le Mans
Races	Wins	Podiums	Poles	F/Laps
123	27	55	20	11
- Teams' Championships: 2 (2025 IMSA SCC & (2025 ELMS)
- Constructors' Championships: 1 (2025 IMSA SCC
- Drivers' Championships: 2 (2025 IMSA SCC & (2025 ELMS)

The Chevrolet Corvette Z06 GT3.R is a grand tourer racing car designed and built by Pratt Miller Engineering and Chevrolet for use in Group GT3 competition. Launched in 2023, the Z06 GT3.R is based on the eighth generation Chevrolet Corvette Z06, and succeeds both the Corvette C8.R and the Callaway-built C7 GT3-R, the former of which was retired following the discontinuation of the LM GTE class. It currently competes in a number of racing series worldwide, including the FIA World Endurance Championship, IMSA SportsCar Championship, and GT World Challenge, with participating teams receiving works support from General Motors.

== Development ==
The Z06 GT3.R was launched on 27 January 2023, on the eve of the 2023 24 Hours of Daytona. The reveal occurred following a two-year testing program, with virtual simulations in Chevrolet's Driver in the Loop simulator beginning in early 2021. This was followed by the car's first on-track test in September 2022, kicking off a full year of on-track development prior to customer deliveries in Q3 of 2023. The car was seen testing at the Sebring International Raceway in March 2023.

An 'Evo' update for the Corvette Z06 GT3.R was confirmed by Chevrolet to be introduced for 2027.

== Selected teams ==
While Corvette race cars produced by General Motors and Pratt Miller have typically raced under Corvette Racing as a full factory operation, Chevrolet transitioned to a customer team effort with the Corvette Z06 GT3.R, though each team would receive works support during racing events on site. Chevrolet opted for a selective approach when signing customer teams, aiming to nurture a close connection between factory and team, rather than going for a mass production route and leaving customer teams to learn the car on their own.

The Corvette continues to be represented by Pratt Miller Motorsports in the IMSA SportsCar Championship in GTD Pro. TF Sport are in charge of the Corvette operation in the FIA World Endurance Championship, selected by Chevrolet to use the Z06 GT3.R ahead of the series' switch from LM GTE to Group GT3 machinery in 2023. Six additional teams have since joined the customer program; AWA Racing, Chouest Povoledo Racing, DragonSpeed, DXDT Racing, Johor Motorsports Racing JMR, Steller Motorsport, and Trackhouse Racing.

Team	Series
(Canada) AWA	IMSA SportsCar Championship (GTD)
(United States) Chouest Povoledo Racing	GT America Series; GT World Challenge America
(United States) Corvette Racing by Pratt Miller Motorsports	IMSA SportsCar Championship (GTD Pro)
(United States) DragonSpeed	IMSA SportsCar Championship (GTD)
(United States) DXDT Racing	GT World Challenge America; IMSA SportsCar Championship (GTD)
(Malaysia) Johor Motorsports Racing JMR	GT World Challenge Asia
(United Kingdom) Steller Motorsport	GT World Challenge Europe
(United Kingdom) TF Sport	Asian Le Mans Series; European Le Mans Series; FIA World Endurance Championship
(United States) Trackhouse by TF Sport	IMSA SportsCar Championship (GTD)

== Competition history ==
The Corvette Z06 GT3.R officially debuted in the 2024 24 Hours of Daytona. Later at the 2024 Qatar 1812 km, it secured its first pole position in any series, and subsequently became the first ever GT3 car to secure LMGT3 pole position courtesy of Tom Van Rompuy. Its first win came in its tenth overall race for the fourth round of the 2024 GT World Challenge America, with DXDT Racing taking the overall win at the Circuit of the Americas with Tommy Milner and Alec Udell. DXDT Racing came close to winning the title, however, as they did not compete in Sonoma Raceway and Sebring International Raceway, they ultimately finished 2nd overall in the standings. Pratt Miller Motorsports also helped secure the Z06 GT3.R's first IMSA SportsCar Championship win at the 2024 Chevrolet Grand Prix at Canadian Tire Motorsport Park.

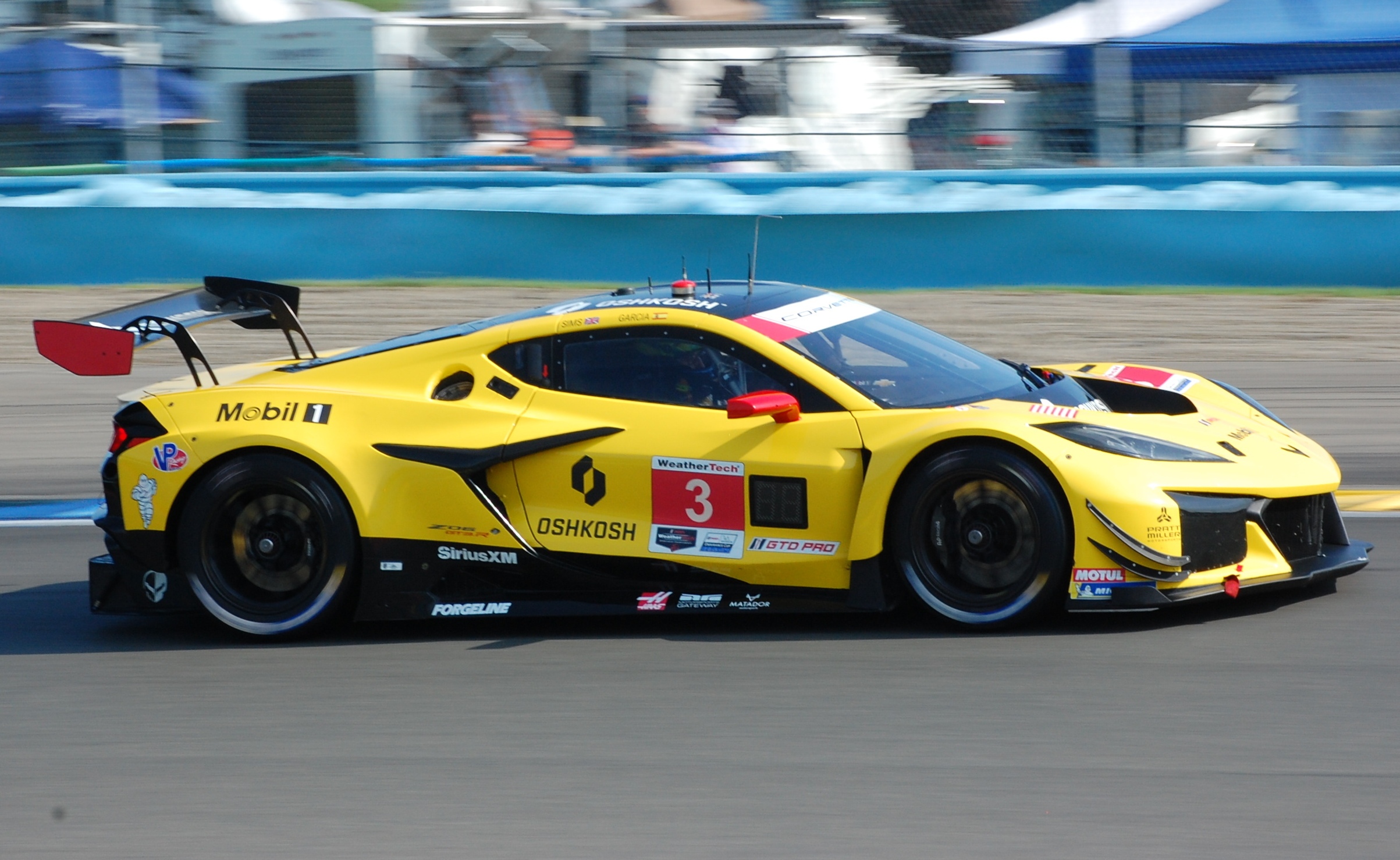
Pratt Miller Motorsports' No. 3 Z06 GT3.R, pictured at the 2025 Sahlen's Six Hours of The Glen, won the GTD Pro title.

2025 saw a few firsts for the Corvette Z06 GT3.R, competing in the Bathurst 12 Hour event for the first time and taking home maiden wins in the FIA World Endurance Championship with TF Sport and in Asian competition with Johor Motorsports Racing JMR. In the 2025 24 Hours of Daytona, AWA Racing took victory in the GTD class. The class-winning car was later retired by the team and stored in their collection. At year's end, the Corvette won two championships, winning the 2025 European Le Mans Series LMGT3 and the 2025 IMSA SportsCar Championship GTD Pro titles with TF Sport and Pratt Miller Motorsports, respectively.

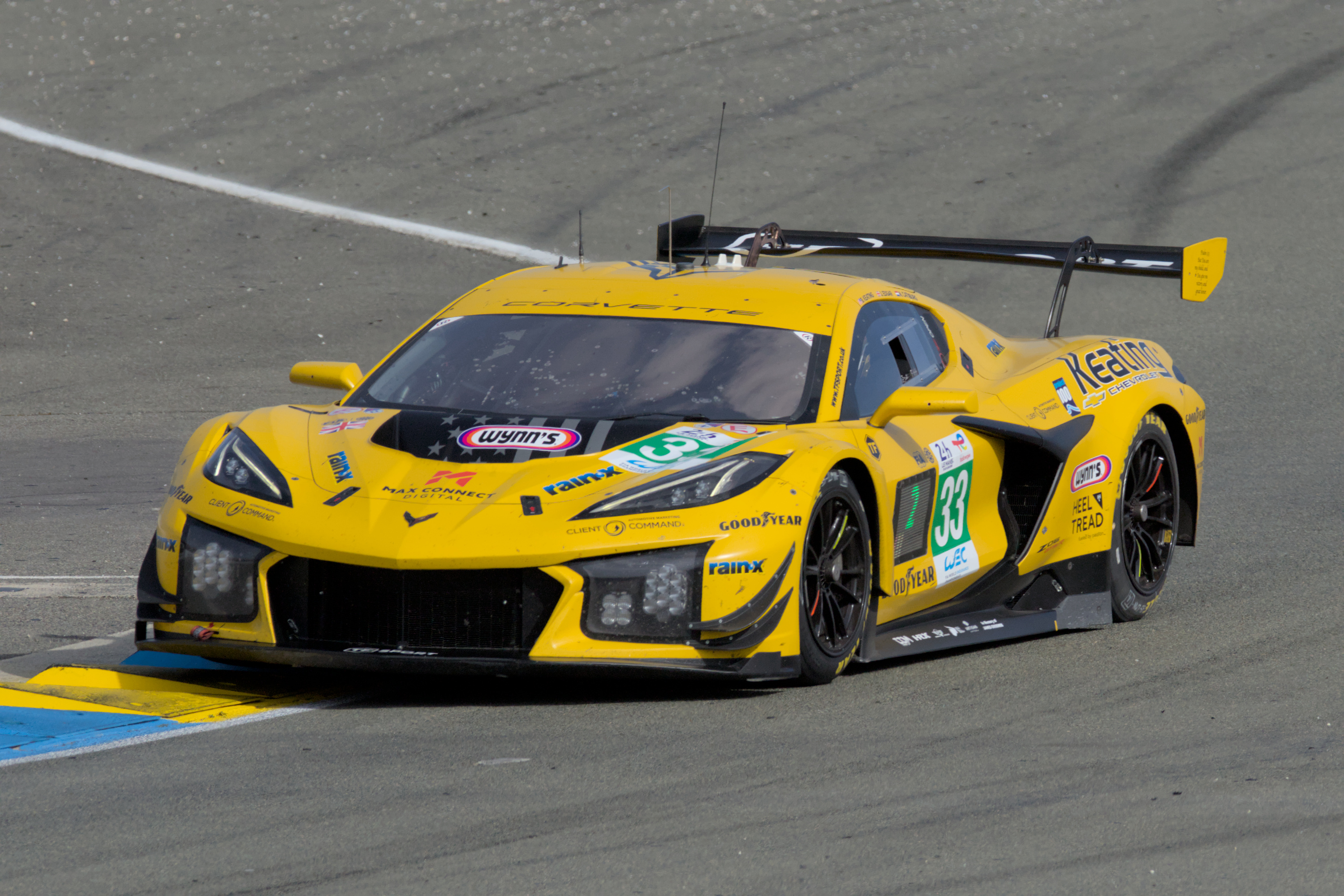
TF Sport's No. 33 Z06 GT3.R won the 2026 24 Hours of Le Mans in LMGT3 for a tenth Le Mans class win for the Corvette.

In 2026, TF Sport took home an LMGT3 class win at the 2026 24 Hours of Le Mans, securing a tenth overall victory for the Chevrolet Corvette in the event. At the 2026 24 Hours of Spa, Johor Motorsports Racing JMR won the Pro-Am class, claiming a first win in the Spa 24 Hours for a Corvette in class since 2009 when the Chevrolet Corvette C6.R won outright in the GT1 class.

== Racing results ==
=== Complete IMSA SportsCar Championship results ===
(key) Races in bold indicates pole position. Races in italics indicates fastest lap.

Complete IMSA SportsCar Championship results
Year	Entrant	Class	Drivers	No.	Rounds											Team		Manufacturer	
Year	Entrant	Class	Drivers	No.	1	2	3	4	5	6	7	8	9	10	11	Pos.	Pts.	Pos.	Pts.
2024					DAY	SEB	LBH	LGA	DET	WGL	MOS	ELK	VIR	IMS	PET				
2024	(United States) Corvette Racing by Pratt Miller Motorsports	GTD Pro	(Spain) Antonio García (United Kingdom) Alexander Sims (Spain) Daniel Juncadella 1–2, 11	3	5	10	(Note: No GTD Pro Class.)	5	10^{P}	3	1**^{PF}**	5	9	3	5	5th	2318	3rd	3073
2024	(United States) Corvette Racing by Pratt Miller Motorsports	GTD Pro	(Netherlands) Nicky Catsburg (United States) Tommy Milner (New Zealand) Earl Bamber 1–2, 11	4	8	11	(Note: No GTD Pro Class.)	3**^{P}**	9^{F}	7	2	6^{P}	8	11	12	6th	2217	3rd	3073
2024	(Canada) AWA	GTD	(United Kingdom) Matt Bell (Canada) Orey Fidani (Germany) Lars Kern END (United Kingdom) Alex Lynn 1	13	21	9	6	11	(Note: No GTD Class.)	7	13	5	6	6^{F}	11	8th	1816	8th	2610
2024	(Canada) AWA	GTD	(Canada) Anthony Mantella (Argentina) Nicolás Varrone (United States) Thomas Merrill (Republic of Ireland) Charlie Eastwood 1	17	18	22			(Note: No GTD Class.)							23rd	251	8th	2610
2025					DAY	SEB	LBH	LGA	DET	WGL	MOS	ELK	VIR	IMS	PET				
2025	(United States) Corvette Racing by Pratt Miller Motorsports	GTD Pro	(Spain) Antonio García (United Kingdom) Alexander Sims (Spain) Daniel Juncadella 1–2, 11	3	2	7		3	2**^{F}**	2	4	4	1	4	3	1st	3265	1st	3370
2025	(United States) Corvette Racing by Pratt Miller Motorsports	GTD Pro	(Netherlands) Nicky Catsburg (United States) Tommy Milner (Argentina) Nico Varrone 1–2, 11	4	7	9		6	6	4	2	10	3	6	2	6th	2908	1st	3370
2025	(United States) Trackhouse by TF Sport	GTD Pro	(New Zealand) Shane van Gisbergen (United States) Ben Keating (New Zealand) Scott McLaughlin (United States) Connor Zilisch	91	9											14th	243	1st	3370
2025	(Canada) AWA	GTD	(United Kingdom) Matt Bell (Canada) Orey Fidani (Germany) Lars Kern END (Germany) Marvin Kirchhöfer 1	13	1	10	13	13		9	9	7	8	6	9	7th	2461	7th	2856
2025	(United States) DXDT Racing	GTD	(United States) Alec Udell 1–2, 4, 6–11 (Republic of Ireland) Charlie Eastwood END (Turkey) Salih Yoluç END (Brazil) Pipo Derani 1 (Canada) Robert Wickens SPR (United States) Tommy Milner 3	36	19	8	15	10		15	4	8	10	17	7	12th	2218	7th	2856
2026					DAY	SEB	LBH	LGA	DET	WGL	MOS	ELK	VIR	IMS	PET				
2026	(United States) Corvette Racing by Pratt Miller Motorsports	GTD Pro	(Spain) Antonio García (Germany) Marvin Kirchhöfer (United Kingdom) Alexander Sims	3	13	4										5th*	521*	3rd*	681*
2026	(United States) Corvette Racing by Pratt Miller Motorsports	GTD Pro	(Netherlands) Nicky Catsburg (United States) Tommy Milner (Argentina) Nico Varrone	4	4	3										3rd*	628*	3rd*	681*
2026	(Canada) 13 Autosport	GTD	(United Kingdom) Matt Bell (Canada) Orey Fidani (Germany) Lars Kern END (United Kingdom) Ben Green 1	13	4**^{F}**	6										4th*	559*	4th*	602*
2026	(United States) DXDT Racing	GTD	(United States) Mason Filippi (Republic of Ireland) Charlie Eastwood END (Turkey) Salih Yoluç END (New Zealand) Scott McLaughlin 1 (Canada) Robert Wickens SPR	36	17	9										13th*	409*	4th*	602*
2026	(United States) DragonSpeed	GTD	(Italy) Giacomo Altoè (Sweden) Henrik Hedman (United Kingdom) Casper Stevenson END (Italy) Matteo Cairoli 1	81	16	15										16th*	347*	4th*	602*

* Season still in progress.

==== Complete IMSA North American Endurance Cup results ====
Year	Entrant	Class	Drivers	No.	Rounds					Team		Manufacturer	
Year	Entrant	Class	Drivers	No.	1	2	3	4	5	Pos.	Pts.	Pos.	Pts.
2024					DAY	SEB	WGL	IMS	PET				
2024	(United States) Corvette Racing by Pratt Miller Motorsports	GTD Pro	(Spain) Antonio García (United Kingdom) Alexander Sims (Spain) Daniel Juncadella 1–2, 5	3	5**^{2}**	10**^{2/3}**	3**^{3}**	3	5	6th	36	1st	40
2024	(United States) Corvette Racing by Pratt Miller Motorsports	GTD Pro	(Netherlands) Nicky Catsburg (United States) Tommy Milner (New Zealand) Earl Bamber 1–2, 5	4	8**^{3/2}**	11	7**^{2}**	11	12	8th	33	1st	40
2024	(Canada) AWA	GTD	(United Kingdom) Matt Bell (Canada) Orey Fidani (Germany) Lars Kern (United Kingdom) Alex Lynn 1	13	21	9	7	6^{F}	11	16th	28	9th	28
2024	(Canada) AWA	GTD	(Canada) Anthony Mantella (Argentina) Nicolás Varrone (United States) Thomas Merrill (Republic of Ireland) Charlie Eastwood 1	17	18	22				22nd	14	9th	28
2025					DAY	SEB	WGL	IMS	PET				
2025	(United States) Corvette Racing by Pratt Miller Motorsports	GTD Pro	(Spain) Antonio García (United Kingdom) Alexander Sims (Spain) Daniel Juncadella 1–2, 5	3	2	7	2	4	3**^{3}**	6th	34	4th	40
2025	(United States) Corvette Racing by Pratt Miller Motorsports	GTD Pro	(Netherlands) Nicky Catsburg (United States) Tommy Milner (Argentina) Nico Varrone 1–2, 5	4	7**^{2}**	9**^{2}**	4	6	2	5th	34	4th	40
2025	(United States) Trackhouse by TF Sport	GTD Pro	(New Zealand) Shane van Gisbergen (United States) Ben Keating (New Zealand) Scott McLaughlin (United States) Connor Zilisch	91	9					14th	8	4th	40
2025	(Canada) AWA	GTD	(United Kingdom) Matt Bell (Canada) Orey Fidani (Germany) Lars Kern (Germany) Marvin Kirchhöfer 1	13	1**^{1}**	10	9	6	9	7th	34	6th	34
2025	(United States) DXDT Racing	GTD	(United States) Alec Udell (Republic of Ireland) Charlie Eastwood (Turkey) Salih Yoluç (Brazil) Pipo Derani 1	36	19	8	15	17	7	14th	28	6th	34
2026					DAY	SEB	WGL	ELK	PET				
2026	(United States) Corvette Racing by Pratt Miller Motorsports	GTD Pro	(Spain) Antonio García (Germany) Marvin Kirchhöfer (United Kingdom) Alexander Sims	3	13**^{2/2}**	4				4th*	18*	2nd*	24*
2026	(United States) Corvette Racing by Pratt Miller Motorsports	GTD Pro	(Netherlands) Nicky Catsburg (United States) Tommy Milner (Argentina) Nico Varrone	4	4**^{3/3/1}**	3**^{3/3}**				3rd*	21*	2nd*	24*
2026	(Canada) 13 Autosport	GTD	(United Kingdom) Matt Bell (Canada) Orey Fidani (Germany) Lars Kern (United Kingdom) Ben Green 1	13	4**^{F/2}**	6				9th*	16*	5th*	18*
2026	(United States) DXDT Racing	GTD	(Republic of Ireland) Charlie Eastwood (United States) Mason Filippi (Turkey) Salih Yoluç (New Zealand) Scott McLaughlin 1	36	17**^{1}**	9				7th*	17	5th*	18*
2026	(United States) DragonSpeed	GTD	(Italy) Giacomo Altoè (Sweden) Henrik Hedman (United Kingdom) Casper Stevenson (Italy) Matteo Cairoli 1	81	16	15				18th*	14*	5th*	18*

* Season still in progress. ^{123} Top 3 position at MEC interval.

=== Complete FIA World Endurance Championship results ===
(key) Races with ^{P} indicates pole position. Races with ^{F} indicates fastest lap.

Year	Entrant	Class	Drivers	No.	Rounds								Pos.	Pts.
Year	Entrant	Class	Drivers	No.	1	2	3	4	5	6	7	8	Pos.	Pts.
2024					QAT	IMO	SPA	LMS	SAP	COA	FUJ	BHR		
2024	(United Kingdom) TF Sport	LMGT3	(Angola) Rui Andrade (Republic of Ireland) Charlie Eastwood (Belgium) Tom van Rompuy	81	Ret**^{P}**	7	Ret	11	8	Ret	4	2	10th	50
2024	(United Kingdom) TF Sport	LMGT3	(France) Sébastien Baud (Spain) Daniel Juncadella (Japan) Hiroshi Koizumi	82	10	8	12	9	Ret	8	Ret	3	12th	37
2025					QAT	IMO	SPA	LMS	SAP	COA	FUJ	BHR		
2025	(Canada) AWA	LMGT3	(United Kingdom) Matt Bell (Canada) Orey Fidani (Germany) Lars Kern	13				10					–	
2025	(United Kingdom) TF Sport	LMGT3	(United Kingdom) Jonny Edgar (Spain) Daniel Juncadella (United States) Ben Keating	33	1	7	13	7	7	NC	11	6	6th	78
2025	(United Kingdom) TF Sport	LMGT3	(Angola) Rui Andrade (Republic of Ireland) Charlie Eastwood (Belgium) Tom van Rompuy	81	Ret	6	14	3	2	13	1	11	5th	81
2026					IMO	SPA	LMS	SAP	COA	FUJ	QAT	BHR		
2026	(United Kingdom) TF Sport	LMGT3	(United Kingdom) Ben Green (Malaysia) Prince Jefri Ibrahim (Malaysia) Afiq Ikhwan Yazid	2									–	
2026	(United Kingdom) TF Sport	LMGT3	(Netherlands) Nicky Catsburg (United Kingdom) Jonny Edgar (United States) Ben Keating	33										
2026	Racing Team Turkey by TF	LMGT3	(Republic of Ireland) Peter Dempsey (Republic of Ireland) Charlie Eastwood (Turkey) Salih Yoluç	34										
2026	(Canada) 13 Autosport	LMGT3	(United Kingdom) Matt Bell (Canada) Orey Fidani (Germany) Lars Kern	13									–	

* Season still in progress. – Not eligible for championship points.

=== Complete Intercontinental GT Challenge results ===
Year	Entrant	Class	Drivers	No.	Rounds					Pos.	Pts.
Year	Entrant	Class	Drivers	No.	1	2	3	4	5	Pos.	Pts.
2026					BAT	NUR	SPA	SUZ	IND		
2026	(Malaysia) Johor Motorsports RacingJMR	Pro	(New Zealand) Earl Bamber (Netherlands) Nicky Catsburg (United Kingdom) Alexander Sims	2	Ret					5th*	2*
2026	(Malaysia) Johor Motorsports RacingJMR	Pro-Am	(United Kingdom) Ben Green (Malaysia) Prince Abu Bakar Ibrahim (Malaysia) Prince Jefri Ibrahim (Australia) Jordan Love	99	13					5th*	2*
2026	(United Kingdom) Steller Motorsport	Gold	(France) Antoine Doquin (Spain) Lorenzo Fluxá (Denmark) Dennis Lind	24						5th*	2*

=== Complete European Le Mans Series results ===
(key) Races in bold indicates pole position. Races in italics indicates fastest lap.

Year	Entrant	Class	Drivers	No.	Rounds						Pos.	Pts.
Year	Entrant	Class	Drivers	No.	1	2	3	4	5	6	Pos.	Pts.
2025					BAR	LEC	IMO	SPA	SIL	POR		
2025	(United Kingdom) TF Sport	LMGT3	(Angola) Rui Andrade (Republic of Ireland) Charlie Eastwood (Japan) Hiroshi Koizumi	82	6	Ret	1	8	3	1	1st	78
2026					BAR	LEC	IMO	SPA	SIL	POR		
2026	(United Kingdom) TF Sport	LMGT3	(Republic of Ireland) Charlie Eastwood (United States) Blake McDonald (United States) Alec Udell	33								

* Season still in progress. ** Not eligible for championship points.

=== Complete Asian Le Mans Series results ===
(key) Races in bold indicates pole position. Races in italics indicates fastest lap.

Year	Entrant	Class	Drivers	No.	Rounds						Pos.	Pts.
Year	Entrant	Class	Drivers	No.	1	2	3	4	5	6	Pos.	Pts.
					SEP		DUB		ABU			
2025-26	(United Kingdom) TF Sport	GT	(United Kingdom) Matt Bell (United States) Blake McDonald (Republic of Ireland) James Roe	11	15	9	Ret	13	10	13	16th	4
2025-26	Racing Team Turkey	GT	(Republic of Ireland) Charlie Eastwood (Belgium) Tom van Rompuy (Turkey) Salih Yoluç	34	8	19	8	8	Ret	11	13th	13
2025-26	(Malaysia) Johor Motorsports JMR	GT	(Malaysia) Prince Abu Bakar Ibrahim (United Kingdom) Alexander Sims (Australia) Yasser Shahin 1–4 (Malaysia) Prince Jefri Ibrahim 5–6	66	16**^{P}**	Ret**^{P}**	14	15	12	Ret	18th	2
2025-26	(Malaysia) Johor Motorsports JMR	GT	(United Kingdom) Ben Green (Malaysia) Prince Jefri Ibrahim (Australia) Jordan Love	99	9	12	13	11	WD	WD	17th	2

* Season still in progress. ** Not eligible for championship points.

=== Complete GT World Challenge Europe results ===
Year	Entrant	Class	Drivers	No.	Rounds																	Overall		Endurance		Sprint	
Year	Entrant	Class	Drivers	No.	Rounds																	Pos.	Pts	Pos.	Pts	Pos.	Pts
2025					LEC	BRH		ZAN		MNZ	SPA			MIS		MAG		NÜR	VAL		BAR						
2025					LEC	S1	S2	S1	S2	MNZ	6H	12H	24H	S1	S2	S1	S2	NÜR	S1	S2	BAR						
2025	(Malaysia) Johor Motorsports JMR	Bronze Cup	(Malaysia) Prince Abu Bakar Ibrahim (Malaysia) Prince Jefri Ibrahim (Australia) Jordan Love (United Kingdom) Alexander Sims	2							16	14	12									NC	0	NC	0	N/A	
2025	(United Kingdom) Steller Motorsport	Silver Cup	(United Kingdom) Lorcan Hanafin END (Belgium) Matisse Lismont 1–5 (United Kingdom) Kiern Jewiss 1 (Finland) Jesse Salmenautio 2–3 (Canada) Daniel Ali 4–5, 8, 10 (Netherlands) Olivier Hart 5 (United States) Alec Udell 8 (Canada) Adam Ali 10	24	2	8	8	Ret	8	8	3	10	8					Ret			14	9th	45	8th	39	10th	6
2026					LEC	BRH		MNZ	SPA			MIS		MAG		NÜR	ZAN		BAR		POR						
2026					LEC	S1	S2	MNZ	6H	12H	24H	S1	S2	S1	S2	NÜR	S1	S2	S1	S2	POR						
2026	(United Kingdom) Steller Motorsport	Gold Cup	(France) Antoine Doquin (Spain) Lorenzo Fluxá (Denmark) Dennis Lind	24																							

=== Complete GT World Challenge America results ===
Year	Entrant	Class	Drivers	No.	Rounds													Team		Manufacturer	
Year	Entrant	Class	Drivers	No.	1		2		3		4		5		6		13	Pos.	Pts.	Pos.	Pts.
2024					SON		SEB		COA		VIR		ELK		BAR		IND				
2024	(United States) DXDT Racing	Pro-Am Cup	(United States) Bryan Sellers (United States) Scott Smithson 2–4 (United States) Bryson Morris 5–6 (United States) Patrick Liddy 7 (United States) Blake McDonald 7	08 2–5; 64 6–7			Ret	WD	5	11	6	3	8**^{P}**	1	1	4	6	4th	156		
2024	(United States) DXDT Racing	Pro Cup	(United States) Tommy Milner (United States) Alec Udell (United Kingdom) Alexander Sims 7	63					1**^{PF}**	1^{F}	1**^{PF}**	1**^{PF}**	1**^{P}**	1**^{P}**	1**^{P}**	1	3	2nd	230		
2025					SON		COA		SEB		VIR		ELK		BAR		IND				
2025	(United States) DXDT Racing	Pro-Am Cup	(United Kingdom) Matt Bell (United States) Blake McDonald (United States) Alec Udell 7	11	12	10	1**^{F}**	3	1	3**^{F}**	3	2	2	1	2	1	12	2nd	195	4th	137
2025	(United States) Chouest Povoledo Racing	Pro-Am Cup	(United States) Ross Chouest (Canada) Aaron Povoledo (Netherlands) Nicky Catsburg 7	50	11	8	8	11	8	8	8	4	5	8	9	9	11	10th	53	4th	137
2026					SON		COA		SEB		ATL		ELK		BAR		IND				
2026	(United States) Chouest Povoledo Racing	Pro-Am Cup	(United States) Ross Chouest (Canada) Aaron Povoledo	50	DNS													NC	0	NC	0

=== Complete GT World Challenge Asia results ===
Year	Entrant	Class	Drivers	No.	Rounds												Pos.	Pts.
Year	Entrant	Class	Drivers	No.	1	2	3	4	5	6	7	8	9	10	11	12	Pos.	Pts.
2025					SEP		MAN		BUR		FUJ		OKA		BEI			
2025	(Malaysia) Johor Motorsports Racing JMR	Pro-Am Cup	(Malaysia) Prince Abu Bakar Ibrahim (Australia) Jordan Love 1–4 (United Kingdom) Alexander Sims 5–6	66	11	Ret	4	6	8	Ret	3	11	11	2	2	5	2nd	185
2025	(Malaysia) Johor Motorsports Racing JMR	Pro-Am Cup	(Malaysia) Prince Jefri Ibrahim (United Kingdom) Alexander Sims 1 (United Kingdom) Ben Green 2–6	99	3	1	7	8	2	1**^{P}**	6	1**^{P}**	9	Ret	6	2	2nd	185

=== Complete International GT Open results ===
Year	Entrant	Class	Drivers	No.	Rounds									Pos.	Pts.
2025					ALG	SPA	HOC	HUN	LEC	RBR	BAR		MNZ		
2025	(United Kingdom) Steller Motorsport	Pro	(Canada) Adam Ali (Canada) Daniel Ali	42							16	15		12th	0
2025	(Malaysia) Johor Motorsports Racing JMR	Pro-Am	(Malaysia) Prince Abu Bakar Ibrahim (Malaysia) Prince Jefri Ibrahim	99		12								12th	0

=== Complete GT America Series results ===
Year	Entrant	Class	Drivers	No.	Rounds																Team		Manufacturer	
Year	Entrant	Class	Drivers	No.	1		2		3		4		5		6		7		8		Pos.	Pts.	Pos.	Pts.
2024					SON		LBH		SEB		COA		VIR		ELK		BAR		IND					
2024	(United States) DXDT Racing	SRO3	(United States) Scott Smithson 3–5 (United States) Bryson Morris 6–7 (United States) Blake McDonald 8	08 3–6; 64 7–8					WD	WD	WD	WD	WD	WD	DNS	DNS	WD	WD	WD	WD	NC	0	NC	0
2025					SON		LBH		COA		SEB		VIR		ELK		BAR		IND					
2025	(United States) DXDT Racing	SRO3	(United States) Blake McDonald 2–8	11			7	7**^{P}**	WD	WD	DNS	DNS	WD**^{P}**	WD**^{P}**	DNS**^{P}**	DNS**^{P}**	DNS**^{P}**	DNS**^{P}**	WD	WD	13th	14	4th	239
2025	(United States) Chouest Povoledo Racing	SRO3	(United States) Ross Chouest	50	7	6	5	5	5	4**^{F}**	5	5	3	4	2	1	1	Ret	7	1	4th	221	4th	239
2026					SON		LBH		COA		SEB		ATL		ELK		BAR		IND					
2026	(United States) Chouest Povoledo Racing	SRO3	(United States) Ross Chouest	50	4	9											`				5th*	14*	4th*	27*

=== Complete 24 Hours of Daytona results ===
Year	Entrant	No.	Drivers	Class	Laps	Pos.	Class Pos.
2024	(United States) Corvette Racing by Pratt Miller Motorsports	3	(Spain) Antonio García (Spain) Daniel Juncadella (United Kingdom) Alexander Sims	GTD Pro	726	30th	5th
2024	(United States) Corvette Racing by Pratt Miller Motorsports	4	(New Zealand) Earl Bamber (Netherlands) Nicky Catsburg (United States) Tommy Milner	GTD Pro	715	37th	8th
2024	(Canada) AWA	13	(United Kingdom) Matt Bell (Canada) Orey Fidani (Germany) Lars Kern (United Kingdom) Alex Lynn	GTD	308	51st	21st
2024	(Canada) AWA	17	(Republic of Ireland) Charlie Eastwood (Canada) Anthony Mantella (United States) Thomas Merrill (Argentina) Nicolás Varrone	GTD	508	46th	18th
2025	(United States) Corvette Racing by Pratt Miller Motorsports	3	(Spain) Antonio García (Spain) Daniel Juncadella (United Kingdom) Alexander Sims	GTD Pro	723	17th	**2nd**
2025	(United States) Corvette Racing by Pratt Miller Motorsports	4	(Netherlands) Nicky Catsburg (United States) Tommy Milner (Argentina) Nicolás Varrone	GTD Pro	723	22nd	7th
2025	(United States) Trackhouse by TF Sport	91	(New Zealand) Shane van Gisbergen (United States) Ben Keating (New Zealand) Scott McLaughlin (United States) Connor Zilisch	GTD Pro	722	24th	9th
2025	(Canada) AWA	13	(United Kingdom) Matt Bell (Canada) Orey Fidani (Germany) Lars Kern (Germany) Marvin Kirchhöfer	GTD	719	25th	**1st**
2025	(United States) DXDT Racing	36	(Brazil) Pipo Derani (Republic of Ireland) Charlie Eastwood (United States) Alec Udell (Turkey) Salih Yoluç	GTD	355	50th	19th
2026	(United States) Corvette Racing by Pratt Miller Motorsports	3	(Spain) Antonio García (Germany) Marvin Kirchhöfer (United Kingdom) Alexander Sims	GTD Pro	637	49th	13th
2026	(United States) Corvette Racing by Pratt Miller Motorsports	4	(Netherlands) Nicky Catsburg (United States) Tommy Milner (Argentina) Nico Varrone	GTD Pro	662	22nd	4th
2026	(Canada) 13 Autosport	13	(United Kingdom) Matt Bell (Canada) Orey Fidani (United Kingdom) Ben Green (Germany) Lars Kern	GTD	661	30th	4th
2026	(United States) DXDT Racing	36	(Republic of Ireland) Charlie Eastwood (United States) Mason Filippi (New Zealand) Scott McLaughlin (Turkey) Salih Yoluç	GTD	568	54th	17th
2026	(United States) DragonSpeed	81	(Italy) Giacomo Altoè (Italy) Matteo Cairoli (Sweden) Henrik Hedman (United Kingdom) Casper Stevenson	GTD	643	47th	16th

=== Complete 24 Hours of Le Mans results ===
Year	Entrant	No.	Drivers	Class	Laps	Pos.	Class Pos.
2024	(United Kingdom) TF Sport	81	(Angola) Rui Andrade (Republic of Ireland) Charlie Eastwood (Belgium) Tom van Rompuy	LMGT3	267	43rd	15th
2024	(United Kingdom) TF Sport	82	(France) Sébastien Baud (Spain) Daniel Juncadella (Japan) Hiroshi Koizumi	LMGT3	278	38th	11th
2025	(Canada) AWA	13	(United Kingdom) Matt Bell (Canada) Orey Fidani (Germany) Lars Kern	LMGT3	338	42nd	10th
2025	(United Kingdom) TF Sport	33	(United Kingdom) Jonny Edgar (Spain) Daniel Juncadella (United States) Ben Keating	LMGT3	339	39th	6th
2025	(United Kingdom) TF Sport	81	(Angola) Rui Andrade (Republic of Ireland) Charlie Eastwood (Belgium) Tom van Rompuy	LMGT3	341	35th	**3rd**
2026	(United Kingdom) TF Sport	2	(United Kingdom) Ben Green (Malaysia) Prince Jefri Ibrahim (Malaysia) Afiq Ikhwan Yazid	LMGT3	330	46th	14th
2026	(United Kingdom) TF Sport	33	(Netherlands) Nicky Catsburg (United Kingdom) Jonny Edgar (United States) Ben Keating	LMGT3	336	33rd	**1st**
2026	Racing Team Turkey by TF	34	(Republic of Ireland) Peter Dempsey (Republic of Ireland) Charlie Eastwood (Turkey) Salih Yoluç	LMGT3	335	38th	6th
2026	(Canada) 13 Autosport	13	(United Kingdom) Matt Bell (Canada) Orey Fidani (Germany) Lars Kern	LMGT3	61	DNF	DNF

=== Complete 24 Hours of Spa results ===
Year	Entrant	No.	Drivers	Class	Laps	Pos.	Class Pos.
2025	(United Kingdom) Steller Motorsport	24	(Canada) Daniel Ali (United Kingdom) Lorcan Hanafin (Netherlands) Olivier Hart (Belgium) Matisse Lismont	Silver Cup	535	40th	8th
2025	(Malaysia) Johor Motorsports Racing JMR	2	(Malaysia) Prince Abu Bakar Ibrahim (Malaysia) Prince Jefri Ibrahim (Australia) Jordan Love (United Kingdom) Alexander Sims	Bronze Cup	527	43rd	12th

=== Complete 12 Hours of Sebring results ===
Year	Entrant	No.	Drivers	Class	Laps	Pos.	Class Pos.
2024	(United States) Corvette Racing by Pratt Miller Motorsports	3	(Spain) Antonio García (Spain) Daniel Juncadella (United Kingdom) Alexander Sims	GTD Pro	313	42nd	10th
2024	(United States) Corvette Racing by Pratt Miller Motorsports	4	(New Zealand) Earl Bamber (Netherlands) Nicky Catsburg (United States) Tommy Milner	GTD Pro	307	45th	11th
2024	(Canada) AWA	13	(United Kingdom) Matt Bell (Canada) Orey Fidani (Germany) Lars Kern	GTD	314	37th	9th
2024	(Canada) AWA	17	(Canada) Anthony Mantella (United States) Thomas Merrill (Argentina) Nicolás Varrone	GTD	2	58th	22nd
2025	(United States) Corvette Racing by Pratt Miller Motorsports	3	(Spain) Antonio García (Spain) Daniel Juncadella (United Kingdom) Alexander Sims	GTD Pro	328	26th	7th
2025	(United States) Corvette Racing by Pratt Miller Motorsports	4	(Netherlands) Nicky Catsburg (United States) Tommy Milner (Argentina) Nicolás Varrone	GTD Pro	325	36th	9th
2025	(Canada) AWA	13	(United Kingdom) Matt Bell (Canada) Orey Fidani (Germany) Lars Kern	GTD	325	39th	10th
2025	(United States) DXDT Racing	36	(Republic of Ireland) Charlie Eastwood (United States) Alec Udell (Turkey) Salih Yoluç	GTD	326	35th	8th
2026	(United States) Corvette Racing by Pratt Miller Motorsports	3	(Spain) Antonio García (Germany) Marvin Kirchhöfer (United Kingdom) Alexander Sims	GTD Pro	321	25th	4th
2026	(United States) Corvette Racing by Pratt Miller Motorsports	4	(Netherlands) Nicky Catsburg (United States) Tommy Milner (Argentina) Nico Varrone	GTD Pro	321	24th	**3rd**
2026	(Canada) 13 Autosport	13	(United Kingdom) Matt Bell (Canada) Orey Fidani (Germany) Lars Kern	GTD	318	37th	6th
2026	(United States) DXDT Racing	36	(Republic of Ireland) Charlie Eastwood (United States) Mason Filippi (Turkey) Salih Yoluç	GTD	317	40th	9th
2026	(United States) DragonSpeed	81	(Italy) Giacomo Altoè (Sweden) Henrik Hedman (United Kingdom) Casper Stevenson	GTD	155	49th	15th

=== Complete Petit Le Mans results ===
Year	Entrant	No.	Drivers	Class	Laps	Pos.	Class Pos.
2024	(United States) Corvette Racing by Pratt Miller Motorsports	3	(Spain) Antonio García (Spain) Daniel Juncadella (United Kingdom) Alexander Sims	GTD Pro	413	21st	5th
2024	(United States) Corvette Racing by Pratt Miller Motorsports	4	(New Zealand) Earl Bamber (Netherlands) Nicky Catsburg (United States) Tommy Milner	GTD Pro	357	46th	12th
2024	(Canada) AWA	13	(United Kingdom) Matt Bell (Canada) Orey Fidani (Germany) Lars Kern	GTD	407	38th	11th
2025	(United States) Corvette Racing by Pratt Miller Motorsports	3	(Spain) Antonio García (Spain) Daniel Juncadella (United Kingdom) Alexander Sims	GTD Pro	405	25th	**3rd**
2025	(United States) Corvette Racing by Pratt Miller Motorsports	4	(Netherlands) Nicky Catsburg (United States) Tommy Milner (Argentina) Nicolás Varrone	GTD Pro	405	24th	**2nd**
2025	(Canada) AWA	13	(United Kingdom) Matt Bell (Canada) Orey Fidani (Germany) Lars Kern	GTD	404	37th	9th
2025	(United States) DXDT Racing	36	(Republic of Ireland) Charlie Eastwood (United States) Alec Udell (Turkey) Salih Yoluç	GTD	404	34th	7th

=== Complete Indianapolis 8 Hour results ===
Year	Entrant	No.	Drivers	Class	Laps	Pos.	Class Pos.
2024	(United States) DXDT Racing	63	(United States) Tommy Milner (United Kingdom) Alexander Sims (United States) Alec Udell	Pro Cup	320	5th	**3rd**
2024	(United States) DXDT Racing	64	(United States) Patrick Liddy (United States) Blake McDonald (United States) Bryan Sellers	Pro-Am Cup	308	14th	6th
2025	(United States) DXDT Racing	11	(United Kingdom) Matt Bell (United States) Blake McDonald (United States) Alec Udell	Pro-Am Cup	174	22nd	12th
2025	(United States) Chouest Povoledo Racing	50	(Netherlands) Nicky Catsburg (United States) Ross Chouest (Canada) Aaron Povoledo	Pro-Am Cup	192	20th	11th

=== Complete Suzuka 1000 Kilometres results ===
Year	Entrant	No.	Drivers	Class	Laps	Pos.	Class Pos.
2025	(Malaysia) Johor Motorsports JMR	2	(Netherlands) Nicky Catsburg (United States) Scott McLaughlin (United Kingdom) Alexander Sims	Pro	170	**3rd**	**3rd**
2025	(Malaysia) Johor Motorsports JMR	99	(Malaysia) Prince Jefri Ibrahim (Malaysia) Prince Abu Bakar Ibrahim (Finland) Konsta Lappalainen	Pro-Am	167	16th	**3rd**

=== Complete Bathurst 12 Hour results ===
Year	Entrant	No.	Drivers	Class	Laps	Pos.	Class Pos.
2026	(Malaysia) Johor Motorsports JMR	2	(New Zealand) Earl Bamber (Netherlands) Nicky Catsburg (United Kingdom) Alexander Sims	Class A Pro	223	Ret	Ret
2026	(Malaysia) Johor Motorsports JMR	99	(United Kingdom) Ben Green (Malaysia) Prince Abu Bakar Ibrahim (Malaysia) Prince Jefri Ibrahim (Australia) Jordan Love	Class A Pro-Am	261	14th	**2nd**

== Complete list of victories ==
No.	Year	Race title	Circuit	Series	Class	Date
1	2024		(United States) Circuit of the Americas	GT World Challenge America	Pro Cup	18 May
2	2024		(United States) Circuit of the Americas	GT World Challenge America	Pro Cup	19 May
3	2024	Chevrolet Grand Prix	(Canada) Canadian Tire Motorsport Park	IMSA WeatherTech SportsCar Championship	GTD Pro	14 July
4	2024		(United States) Virginia International Raceway	GT World Challenge America	Pro Cup	20 July
5	2024		(United States) Virginia International Raceway	GT World Challenge America	Pro Cup	21 July
6	2024		(United States) Road America	GT World Challenge America	Pro Cup	17 August
7	2024		(United States) Road America	GT World Challenge America	Pro Cup	18 August
8	2024		(United States) Road America	GT World Challenge America	Pro-Am Cup	18 August
9	2024		(United States) Barber Motorsports Park	GT World Challenge America	Pro Cup	7 September
10	2024		(United States) Barber Motorsports Park	GT World Challenge America	Pro-Am Cup	7 September
11	2024		(United States) Barber Motorsports Park	GT World Challenge America	Pro Cup	8 September
12	2025*	Rolex 24 at Daytona	(United States) Daytona International Speedway	IMSA WeatherTech SportsCar Championship	GTD	25-26 January
13	2025*	Qatar 1812 km	(Qatar) Losail International Circuit	FIA World Endurance Championship	LMGT3	28 February
14	2025*		(Malaysia) Sepang International Circuit	GT World Challenge Asia	Overall	13 April
14	2025*		(Malaysia) Sepang International Circuit	GT World Challenge Asia	Pro-Am Cup	13 April
15	2025*		(United States) Circuit of the Americas	GT World Challenge America	Pro-Am Cup	26 April
16	2025*		(United States) Sebring International Raceway	GT World Challenge America	Pro-Am Cup	17 May
17	2025*		(Thailand) Chang International Circuit	GT World Challenge Asia	Overall	31 May
18	2025*	4 Hours of Imola	(Italy) Imola Circuit	European Le Mans Series	LMGT3	6 July
19	2025*		(Japan) Fuji Speedway	GT World Challenge Asia	Overall	13 July
20	2025*		(United States) Road America	GT America Series	SRO3	17 August
21	2025*		(United States) Road America	GT World Challenge America	Pro-Am Cup	17 August
22	2025*	Michelin GT Challenge at VIR	(United States) Virginia International Raceway	IMSA WeatherTech SportsCar Championship	GTD Pro	24 August
23	2025*		(United States) Barber Motorsports Park	GT America Series	SRO3	6 August
24	2025*		(United States) Barber Motorsports Park	GT World Challenge America	Pro-Am Cup	7 August
25	2025*	6 Hours of Fuji	(Japan) Fuji Speedway	FIA World Endurance Championship	LMGT3	28 September
26	2026	24 Hours of Le Mans	(France) Circuit de la Sarthe	FIA World Endurance Championship	LMGT3	13-14 June
