= 2024 GT World Challenge America =

Motor racing competition

The 2024 Fanatec GT World Challenge America Powered by AWS was the eighteenth season of the United States Auto Club's GT World Challenge America, and the seventh under ownership of SRO Motorsports Group.

The season began at Sonoma on April 5, and ended at Indianapolis on October 6.

== Calendar ==
The preliminary calendar released on July 1, 2023, at the SRO's annual 24 Hours of Spa press conference, featuring 14 races across seven rounds. In September, an updated schedule was released, the SRO announced that Barber Motorsports Park would fill the vacancy in the schedule, and Sebring International Raceway would replace NOLA Motorsports Park.

Round	Circuit	Date	Map
1	Sonoma Raceway, Sonoma, California	April 5–7	2024 GT World Challenge America is located in the United States
2	Sebring International Raceway, Sebring, Florida	May 3–5	2024 GT World Challenge America is located in the United States
3	Circuit of the Americas, Austin, Texas	May 17–19	2024 GT World Challenge America is located in the United States
4	Virginia International Raceway, Alton, Virginia	July 19–21	2024 GT World Challenge America is located in the United States
5	Road America, Elkhart Lake, Wisconsin	August 16–18	2024 GT World Challenge America is located in the United States
6	Barber Motorsports Park, Birmingham, Alabama	September 6–8	2024 GT World Challenge America is located in the United States
7	Indianapolis Motor Speedway, Indianapolis, Indiana	October 4–6	2024 GT World Challenge America is located in the United States

== Entry list ==
Team	Car	Engine	No.	Drivers	Class	Rounds
(United States) CrowdStrike Racing by Riley Motorsports	Mercedes-AMG GT3 Evo	Mercedes-AMG M159 6.2 L V8	04	(United States) Colin Braun	PA	1–3
(United States) CrowdStrike Racing by Riley Motorsports	Mercedes-AMG GT3 Evo	Mercedes-AMG M159 6.2 L V8	04	(United States) George Kurtz	PA	1–3
(United States) DXDT Racing	Mercedes-AMG GT3 Evo	Mercedes-AMG M159 6.2 L V8	08	(United States) Bryan Sellers	PA	1
(United States) DXDT Racing	Mercedes-AMG GT3 Evo	Mercedes-AMG M159 6.2 L V8	08	(United States) Scott Smithson	PA	1
(United States) DXDT Racing	Mercedes-AMG GT3 Evo	Mercedes-AMG M159 6.2 L V8	91	(United States) Jeff Burton	PA	1
(United States) DXDT Racing	Mercedes-AMG GT3 Evo	Mercedes-AMG M159 6.2 L V8	91	(Switzerland) Philip Ellis	PA	1
(United States) DXDT Racing	Chevrolet Corvette Z06 GT3.R	Chevrolet LT6 5.5 L V8	08	(United States) Bryan Sellers	PA	2–5
(United States) DXDT Racing	Chevrolet Corvette Z06 GT3.R	Chevrolet LT6 5.5 L V8	08	(United States) Scott Smithson	PA	2–4
(United States) DXDT Racing	Chevrolet Corvette Z06 GT3.R	Chevrolet LT6 5.5 L V8	08	(United States) Bryson Morris	PA	5
(United States) DXDT Racing	Chevrolet Corvette Z06 GT3.R	Chevrolet LT6 5.5 L V8	63	(United States) Tommy Milner	P	3–7
(United States) DXDT Racing	Chevrolet Corvette Z06 GT3.R	Chevrolet LT6 5.5 L V8	63	(United States) Alec Udell	P	3–7
(United States) DXDT Racing	Chevrolet Corvette Z06 GT3.R	Chevrolet LT6 5.5 L V8	63	(United Kingdom) Alexander Sims	P	7
(United States) DXDT Racing	Chevrolet Corvette Z06 GT3.R	Chevrolet LT6 5.5 L V8	64	(United States) Bryson Morris	PA	6
(United States) DXDT Racing	Chevrolet Corvette Z06 GT3.R	Chevrolet LT6 5.5 L V8	64	(United States) Bryan Sellers	PA	6–7
(United States) DXDT Racing	Chevrolet Corvette Z06 GT3.R	Chevrolet LT6 5.5 L V8	64	(United States) Patrick Liddy	PA	7
(United States) DXDT Racing	Chevrolet Corvette Z06 GT3.R	Chevrolet LT6 5.5 L V8	64	(United States) Blake McDonald	PA	7
(United States) Mercedes-AMG Team Lone Star Racing	Mercedes-AMG GT3 Evo	Mercedes-AMG M159 6.2 L V8	4	(Spain) Alex Palou	P	7
(United States) Mercedes-AMG Team Lone Star Racing	Mercedes-AMG GT3 Evo	Mercedes-AMG M159 6.2 L V8	4	(Germany) Fabian Schiller	P	7
(United States) Mercedes-AMG Team Lone Star Racing	Mercedes-AMG GT3 Evo	Mercedes-AMG M159 6.2 L V8	4	(Germany) Luca Stolz	P	7
(United States) Flying Lizard Motorsports	Aston Martin Vantage AMR GT3 Evo	Aston Martin M177 4.0 L Turbo V8	8	(United States) Andy Lee	PA	1–4
(United States) Flying Lizard Motorsports	Aston Martin Vantage AMR GT3 Evo	Aston Martin M177 4.0 L Turbo V8	8	(United States) Elias Sabo	PA	1–4
(United States) Flying Lizard Motorsports	BMW M4 GT3	BMW S58B30T0 3.0 L Twin Turbo I6	8	(United States) Andy Lee	PA	5–7
(United States) Flying Lizard Motorsports	BMW M4 GT3	BMW S58B30T0 3.0 L Twin Turbo I6	8	(United States) Elias Sabo	PA	5–7
(United States) Flying Lizard Motorsports	BMW M4 GT3	BMW S58B30T0 3.0 L Twin Turbo I6	8	(United Kingdom) Nick Yelloly	PA	7
(Germany) Herberth Motorsport	Porsche 911 GT3 R (992)	Porsche M97/80 4.2 L Flat-6	10	(Hong Kong) Antares Au	PA	7
(Germany) Herberth Motorsport	Porsche 911 GT3 R (992)	Porsche M97/80 4.2 L Flat-6	10	(Netherlands) Loek Hartog	PA	7
(Germany) Herberth Motorsport	Porsche 911 GT3 R (992)	Porsche M97/80 4.2 L Flat-6	10	(Switzerland) Patric Niederhauser	PA	7
(United States) Mercedes-AMG Austin with Esses Racing	Mercedes-AMG GT3 Evo	Mercedes-AMG M159 6.2 L V8	19	(United States) Will Hardeman	PA 1, 3–4; Am 5	1, 3–5
(United States) Mercedes-AMG Austin with Esses Racing	Mercedes-AMG GT3 Evo	Mercedes-AMG M159 6.2 L V8	19	(United Kingdom) Adam Carroll	PA 1, 3–4; Am 5	1, 4
(United States) Mercedes-AMG Austin with Esses Racing	Mercedes-AMG GT3 Evo	Mercedes-AMG M159 6.2 L V8	19	(United States) Alan Metni	PA 1, 3–4; Am 5	3, 5
(Germany) Car Collection Motorsport	Porsche 911 GT3 R (992)	Porsche M97/80 4.2 L Flat-6	21	(Switzerland) Alex Fontana	PA	7
(Germany) Car Collection Motorsport	Porsche 911 GT3 R (992)	Porsche M97/80 4.2 L Flat-6	21	(Germany) Yannick Mettler	PA	7
(Germany) Car Collection Motorsport	Porsche 911 GT3 R (992)	Porsche M97/80 4.2 L Flat-6	21	(United States) 'Hash'	PA	7
(Canada) ST Racing	BMW M4 GT3	BMW S58B30T0 3.0 L Twin Turbo I6	28	(United States) Bill Auberlen	P	All
(Canada) ST Racing	BMW M4 GT3	BMW S58B30T0 3.0 L Twin Turbo I6	28	(United States) Varun Choksey	P	All
(Canada) ST Racing	BMW M4 GT3	BMW S58B30T0 3.0 L Twin Turbo I6	28	(Austria) Philipp Eng	P	7
(Canada) ST Racing	BMW M4 GT3	BMW S58B30T0 3.0 L Twin Turbo I6	38	(Canada) Samantha Tan	PA	All
(Canada) ST Racing	BMW M4 GT3	BMW S58B30T0 3.0 L Twin Turbo I6	38	(United States) Neil Verhagen	PA	All
(Canada) ST Racing	BMW M4 GT3	BMW S58B30T0 3.0 L Twin Turbo I6	38	(United States) John Capestro-Dubets	PA	7
(United States) Turner Motorsport	BMW M4 GT3	BMW S58B30T0 3.0 L Twin Turbo I6	29	(United States) Robby Foley	PA	All
(United States) Turner Motorsport	BMW M4 GT3	BMW S58B30T0 3.0 L Twin Turbo I6	29	(United States) Justin Rothberg	PA	All
(United States) Turner Motorsport	BMW M4 GT3	BMW S58B30T0 3.0 L Twin Turbo I6	29	(United States) Patrick Gallagher	PA	7
(Belgium) Team WRT	BMW M4 GT3	BMW S58B30T0 3.0 L Twin Turbo I6	31	(South Africa) Sheldon van der Linde	P	7
(Belgium) Team WRT	BMW M4 GT3	BMW S58B30T0 3.0 L Twin Turbo I6	31	(Belgium) Dries Vanthoor	P	7
(Belgium) Team WRT	BMW M4 GT3	BMW S58B30T0 3.0 L Twin Turbo I6	31	(Belgium) Charles Weerts	P	7
(Belgium) Team WRT	BMW M4 GT3	BMW S58B30T0 3.0 L Twin Turbo I6	33	(Brazil) Augusto Farfus	P	7
(Belgium) Team WRT	BMW M4 GT3	BMW S58B30T0 3.0 L Twin Turbo I6	33	(United Kingdom) Dan Harper	P	7
(Belgium) Team WRT	BMW M4 GT3	BMW S58B30T0 3.0 L Twin Turbo I6	33	(Germany) Max Hesse	P	7
(United States) GMG Racing	Porsche 911 GT3 R (992)	Porsche M97/80 4.2 L Flat-6	32	(Australia) Tom Sargent	PA	All
(United States) GMG Racing	Porsche 911 GT3 R (992)	Porsche M97/80 4.2 L Flat-6	32	(United States) Kyle Washington	PA	All
(United States) GMG Racing	Porsche 911 GT3 R (992)	Porsche M97/80 4.2 L Flat-6	32	(Turkey) Ayhancan Güven	PA	7
(United States) Chouest Povoledo Racing	Mercedes-AMG GT3 Evo	Mercedes-AMG M159 6.2 L V8	50	(United States) Ross Chouest	PA	1–6
(United States) Chouest Povoledo Racing	Mercedes-AMG GT3 Evo	Mercedes-AMG M159 6.2 L V8	50	(Canada) Aaron Povoledo	PA	1–6
(New Zealand) Earl Bamber Motorsport	Porsche 911 GT3 R (992)	Porsche M97/80 4.2 L Flat-6	61	(Denmark) Bastian Buus	PA	7
(New Zealand) Earl Bamber Motorsport	Porsche 911 GT3 R (992)	Porsche M97/80 4.2 L Flat-6	61	(Malaysia) Adrian D'Silva	PA	7
(New Zealand) Earl Bamber Motorsport	Porsche 911 GT3 R (992)	Porsche M97/80 4.2 L Flat-6	61	(New Zealand) Brendon Leitch	PA	7
(Australia) SunEnergy1 Racing	Mercedes-AMG GT3 Evo	Mercedes-AMG M159 6.2 L V8	75	(Austria) Lucas Auer	PA	7
(Australia) SunEnergy1 Racing	Mercedes-AMG GT3 Evo	Mercedes-AMG M159 6.2 L V8	75	(Australia) Kenny Habul	PA	7
(Australia) SunEnergy1 Racing	Mercedes-AMG GT3 Evo	Mercedes-AMG M159 6.2 L V8	75	(Australia) Jayden Ojeda	PA	7
(United States) RennSport1	Porsche 911 GT3 R (992)	Porsche M97/80 4.2 L Flat-6	85	(United States) Trent Hindman	P 2, 4 PA 3, 5–7	2–7
(United States) RennSport1	Porsche 911 GT3 R (992)	Porsche M97/80 4.2 L Flat-6	85	(United States) Spencer Pumpelly	P 2, 4 PA 3, 5–7	2, 4
(United States) RennSport1	Porsche 911 GT3 R (992)	Porsche M97/80 4.2 L Flat-6	85	(United States) Jake Pedersen	P 2, 4 PA 3, 5–7	3, 5–7
(United States) RennSport1	Porsche 911 GT3 R (992)	Porsche M97/80 4.2 L Flat-6	85	(Netherlands) Kay van Berlo	P 2, 4 PA 3, 5–7	7
(Italy) AF Corse	Ferrari 296 GT3	Ferrari F163 3.0 L Turbo V6	88	(Italy) Riccardo Agostini	PA	3, 6–7
(Italy) AF Corse	Ferrari 296 GT3	Ferrari F163 3.0 L Turbo V6	88	(Brazil) Custodio Toledo	PA	3, 6–7
(Italy) AF Corse	Ferrari 296 GT3	Ferrari F163 3.0 L Turbo V6	88	(Monaco) Cédric Sbirrazzuoli	PA	7
(Italy) AF Corse	Ferrari 296 GT3	Ferrari F163 3.0 L Turbo V6	163	(Brazil) Oswaldo Negri Jr.	PA 7 Am 5-6	5–7
(Italy) AF Corse	Ferrari 296 GT3	Ferrari F163 3.0 L Turbo V6	163	(United States) Jay Schreibman	PA 7 Am 5-6	5–7
(Italy) AF Corse	Ferrari 296 GT3	Ferrari F163 3.0 L Turbo V6	163	(Finland) Toni Vilander	PA 7 Am 5-6	7
(United States) Regulator Racing	Mercedes-AMG GT3 Evo	Mercedes-AMG M159 6.2 L V8	91	(United States) Jeff Burton	PA	2–7
(United States) Regulator Racing	Mercedes-AMG GT3 Evo	Mercedes-AMG M159 6.2 L V8	91	(Switzerland) Philip Ellis	PA	2–7
(United States) Regulator Racing	Mercedes-AMG GT3 Evo	Mercedes-AMG M159 6.2 L V8	91	(Finland) Elias Seppänen	PA	7
(Canada) Montreal Motorsport Group	Porsche 911 GT3 R (992)	Porsche M97/80 4.2 L Flat-6	92	(Canada) Jean-Frédéric Laberge	PA	5–6
(Canada) Montreal Motorsport Group	Porsche 911 GT3 R (992)	Porsche M97/80 4.2 L Flat-6	92	(Canada) Kyle Marcelli	PA	5–6
(United States) Racers Edge Motorsports	Acura NSX GT3 Evo22	Acura JNC1 3.5 L Turbo V6	93	(United States) Luca Mars	P	All
(United States) Racers Edge Motorsports	Acura NSX GT3 Evo22	Acura JNC1 3.5 L Turbo V6	93	(United States) Zach Veach	P	All
(United States) Racers Edge Motorsports	Acura NSX GT3 Evo22	Acura JNC1 3.5 L Turbo V6	93	(Colombia) Gabby Chaves	P	7
(United States) Random Vandals Racing	BMW M4 GT3	BMW S58B30T0 3.0 L Twin Turbo I6	99	(United States) Kenton Koch	P	5–7
(United States) Random Vandals Racing	BMW M4 GT3	BMW S58B30T0 3.0 L Twin Turbo I6	99	(United States) Madison Snow	P	5
(United States) Random Vandals Racing	BMW M4 GT3	BMW S58B30T0 3.0 L Twin Turbo I6	99	(United States) Conor Daly	P	6–7
(United States) Random Vandals Racing	BMW M4 GT3	BMW S58B30T0 3.0 L Twin Turbo I6	99	(United States) Connor De Phillippi	P	7
(United States) Wright Motorsports	Porsche 911 GT3 R (992)	Porsche M97/80 4.2 L Flat-6	120	(United States) Adam Adelson	P	All
(United States) Wright Motorsports	Porsche 911 GT3 R (992)	Porsche M97/80 4.2 L Flat-6	120	(United States) Elliott Skeer	P	All
(United States) Wright Motorsports	Porsche 911 GT3 R (992)	Porsche M97/80 4.2 L Flat-6	120	(Germany) Laurin Heinrich	P	7
(Hong Kong) Mercedes-AMG Team GruppeM Racing	Mercedes-AMG GT3 Evo	Mercedes-AMG M159 6.2 L V8	130	(Germany) Maro Engel	P	7
(Hong Kong) Mercedes-AMG Team GruppeM Racing	Mercedes-AMG GT3 Evo	Mercedes-AMG M159 6.2 L V8	130	(Andorra) Jules Gounon	P	7
(Hong Kong) Mercedes-AMG Team GruppeM Racing	Mercedes-AMG GT3 Evo	Mercedes-AMG M159 6.2 L V8	130	(Canada) Mikael Grenier	P	7
(Australia) Triple Eight JMR	Mercedes-AMG GT3 Evo	Mercedes-AMG M159 6.2 L V8	888	(Malaysia) Prince Jefri Ibrahim	PA	7
(Australia) Triple Eight JMR	Mercedes-AMG GT3 Evo	Mercedes-AMG M159 6.2 L V8	888	(India) Arjun Maini	PA	7
(Australia) Triple Eight JMR	Mercedes-AMG GT3 Evo	Mercedes-AMG M159 6.2 L V8	888	(Australia) Jordan Love	PA	7

Icon	Class
P	Pro Cup
PA	Pro/Am Cup
Am	Am Cup

Notes:

- Montreal Motorsport Group was originally entered for the season opener at Sonoma, but the team had to withdraw due to delays receiving their race car. They withdrew from subsequent rounds as well due to the same issue.
- CrowdStrike Racing by Riley Motorsports was originally entered for the fourth round at Virginia International Raceway, but was withdrawn following the CrowdStrike incident.
- Scott Smithson was originally scheduled to drive the No. 08 Corvette for DXDT Racing at Road America, but Bryson Morris replaced Smithson after the team and driver parted ways.
- Conor Daly was originally scheduled to drive the No. 99 BMW for Random Vandals Racing at Road America, but it was later announced Daly would miss the race due to an scheduling conflict. Madison Snow replaced Daly for the round.

== Race results ==
Bold indicates overall winner

Round		Circuit	Pole position	IGTC Pro Winners	Pro Winners	Pro/Am Winners	Am Winners	Results
1	R1	(California) Sonoma	(United States) #91 DXDT Racing	Did not participate	**(United States) #120 Wright Motorsports**	(United States) #04 CrowdStrike Racing by Riley Motorsports	No Entries	Report
1	R1	(California) Sonoma	(United States) Jeff Burton (Switzerland) Philip Ellis	Did not participate	**(United States) Adam Adelson** **(United States) Elliott Skeer**	(United States) Colin Braun (United States) George Kurtz	No Entries	Report
1	R2	(California) Sonoma	(United States) #120 Wright Motorsports	Did not participate	**(United States) #120 Wright Motorsports**	(United States) #04 CrowdStrike Racing by Riley Motorsports	No Entries	Report
1	R2	(California) Sonoma	(United States) Adam Adelson (United States) Elliott Skeer	Did not participate	**(United States) Adam Adelson** **(United States) Elliott Skeer**	(United States) Colin Braun (United States) George Kurtz	No Entries	Report
2	R1	(Florida) Sebring	(United States) #91 Regulator Racing	Did not participate	**(United States) #85 RennSport1**	(Canada) #38 ST Racing	No Entries	Report
2	R1	(Florida) Sebring	(United States) Jeff Burton (Switzerland) Philip Ellis	Did not participate	**(United States) Trent Hindman** **(United States) Spencer Pumpelly**	(Canada) Samantha Tan (United States) Neil Verhagen	No Entries	Report
2	R2	(Florida) Sebring	(Canada) #38 ST Racing	Did not participate	**(United States) #85 RennSport1**	(United States) #29 Turner Motorsport	No Entries	Report
2	R2	(Florida) Sebring	(Canada) Samantha Tan (United States) Neil Verhagen	Did not participate	**(United States) Trent Hindman** **(United States) Spencer Pumpelly**	(United States) Robby Foley (United States) Justin Rothberg	No Entries	Report
3	R1	(Texas) COTA	(Italy) #88 AF Corse	Did not participate	**(United States) #63 DXDT Racing**	(Canada) #38 ST Racing	No Entries	Report
3	R1	(Texas) COTA	(Italy) Riccardo Agostini (Brazil) Custodio Toledo	Did not participate	**(United States) Tommy Milner** **(United States) Alec Udell**	(Canada) Samantha Tan (United States) Neil Verhagen	No Entries	Report
3	R2	(Texas) COTA	(Canada) #38 ST Racing	Did not participate	**(United States) #63 DXDT Racing**	(Canada) #38 ST Racing	No Entries	Report
3	R2	(Texas) COTA	(Canada) Samantha Tan (United States) Neil Verhagen	Did not participate	**(United States) Tommy Milner** **(United States) Alec Udell**	(Canada) Samantha Tan (United States) Neil Verhagen	No Entries	Report
4	R1	Virginia	(United States) #91 Regulator Racing	Did not participate	**(United States) #63 DXDT Racing**	(United States) #32 GMG Racing	No Entries	Report
4	R1	Virginia	(United States) Jeff Burton (Switzerland) Philip Ellis	Did not participate	**(United States) Tommy Milner** **(United States) Alec Udell**	(Australia) Tom Sargent (United States) Kyle Washington	No Entries	Report
4	R2	Virginia	(United States) #63 DXDT Racing	Did not participate	(United States) #63 DXDT Racing	**(United States) #91 Regulator Racing**	No Entries	Report
4	R2	Virginia	(United States) Tommy Milner (United States) Alec Udell	Did not participate	(United States) Tommy Milner (United States) Alec Udell	**(United States) Jeff Burton** **(Switzerland) Philip Ellis**	No Entries	Report
5	R1	(Wisconsin) Road America	(United States) #63 DXDT Racing (Note: The Regulator Racing #91 AMG driven by Jeff Burton and Philip Ellis was penalised due to a ride height violation, promoting the DXDT Racing #63 Corvette driven by Tommy Milner and Alec Udell to pole position for race one.)	Did not participate	**(United States) #63 DXDT Racing**	(United States) #29 Turner Motorsport	(United States) #19 Mercedes-AMG Austin with Esses Racing	Report
5	R1	(Wisconsin) Road America	(United States) Tommy Milner (United States) Alec Udell	Did not participate	**(United States) Tommy Milner** **(United States) Alec Udell**	(United States) Robby Foley (United States) Justin Rothberg	(United States) Will Hardeman (United States) Alan Metni	Report
5	R2	(Wisconsin) Road America	(United States) #29 Turner Motorsport	Did not participate	**(United States) #63 DXDT Racing**	(United States) #08 DXDT Racing	(Italy) #163 AF Corse	Report
5	R2	(Wisconsin) Road America	(United States) Robby Foley (United States) Justin Rothberg	Did not participate	**(United States) Tommy Milner** **(United States) Alec Udell**	(United States) Bryson Morris (United States) Bryan Sellers	(Brazil) Oswaldo Negri Jr. (United States) Jay Schreibman	Report
6	R1	(Alabama) Barber	(United States) #63 DXDT Racing	Did not participate	**(United States) #63 DXDT Racing**	(United States) #64 DXDT Racing	(Italy) #163 AF Corse	Report
6	R1	(Alabama) Barber	(United States) Tommy Milner (United States) Alec Udell	Did not participate	**(United States) Tommy Milner** **(United States) Alec Udell**	(United States) Bryson Morris (United States) Bryan Sellers	(Brazil) Oswaldo Negri Jr. (United States) Jay Schreibman	Report
6	R2	(Alabama) Barber	(United States) #29 Turner Motorsport	Did not participate	**(United States) #63 DXDT Racing**	(United States) #91 Regulator Racing	No Finishers	Report
6	R2	(Alabama) Barber	(United States) Robby Foley (United States) Justin Rothberg	Did not participate	**(United States) Tommy Milner** **(United States) Alec Udell**	(United States) Jeff Burton (Switzerland) Philip Ellis	No Finishers	Report
7		(Indiana) Indianapolis	(Germany) #10 Herberth Motorsport	**(Belgium) #31 Team WRT**	(United States) #120 Wright Motorsports	(Germany) #10 Herberth Motorsport	No Entries	Report
7		(Indiana) Indianapolis	(Hong Kong) Antares Au (Netherlands) Loek Hartog (Switzerland) Patric Niederhauser	**(South Africa) Sheldon van der Linde** **(Belgium) Dries Vanthoor** **(Belgium) Charles Weerts**	(United States) Adam Adelson (United States) Elliott Skeer (Germany) Laurin Heinrich	(Hong Kong) Antares Au (Netherlands) Loek Hartog (Switzerland) Patric Niederhauser	No Entries	Report

== Championship standings ==
Scoring system

Championship points are awarded for the first ten positions in each race. Entries are required to complete 75% of the winning car's race distance in order to be classified and earn points. Individual drivers are required to participate for a minimum of 40 minutes in order to earn championship points in any race. Race-by-race entries which only participated in either of the final two races of the season are not eligible for points.

Standard Points

Position	**1st**	**2nd**	**3rd**	**4th**	**5th**	**6th**	**7th**	**8th**	**9th**	**10th**
Points	25	18	15	12	10	8	6	4	2	1

Indianapolis Points

Position	**1st**	**2nd**	**3rd**	**4th**	**5th**	**6th**	**7th**	**8th**	**9th**	**10th**
Points	50	36	30	24	20	16	12	8	4	2

=== Drivers' championship ===
Pos.	Driver	Team	SON		SEB		COT		VIR		ELK		BAR		IND	Points
Pos.	Driver	Team	RD1	RD2	RD1	RD2	RD1	RD2	RD1	RD2	RD1	RD2	RD1	RD2	RDU	Points
Pro class
1	(United States) Adam Adelson (United States) Elliott Skeer	(United States) Wright Motorsports	**1**	**1**	2	**2**	4	**2**	2	5	3	3	5	6	2	257
2	(United States) Alec Udell (United States) Tommy Milner	(United States) DXDT Racing					**1**	1	**1**	**2**	**1**	**1**	**1**	1	5	230
3	(United States) Luca Mars (United States) Zach Veach	(United States) Racers Edge Motorsports	9	6	7	7	Ret	6	4	4	2	5	3	5	4	192
4	(United States) Varun Choksey (United States) Bill Auberlen	(Canada) ST Racing	3	5	6	3	9	7	10†	9	12	6	4	2	11	190
5	(United States) Trent Hindman	(United States) RennSport1			**1**	1			3	3					6	107
6	(United States) Spencer Pumpelly	(United States) RennSport1			**1**	1			3	3						83
7	(Germany) Laurin Heinrich	(United States) Wright Motorsports													2	50
8	(United States) Kenton Koch	(United States) Random Vandals Racing									Ret	7	2	**13**	21	38
9	(Colombia) Gabby Chaves	(United States) Racers Edge Motorsports													4	36
10	(United Kingdom) Alexander Sims	(United States) DXDT Racing													5	30
11	(United States) Conor Daly	(United States) Random Vandals Racing											2	**13**	21	28
12	(Netherlands) Kay van Berlo (United States) Jake Pedersen	(United States) RennSport1													6	24
13	(Austria) Philipp Eng	(Canada) ST Racing													11	20
14	(United States) Madison Snow	(United States) Random Vandals Racing									Ret	7				10
-	(United States) Connor De Phillippi	(United States) Random Vandals Racing													21	-
Drivers ineligible to score points
-	(South Africa) Sheldon van der Linde (Belgium) Dries Vanthoor (Belgium) Charles Weerts	(Belgium) Team WRT													**1**	-
-	(Germany) Maro Engel (Andorra) Jules Gounon (Canada) Mikael Grenier	(Hong Kong) Mercedes-AMG Team GruppeM Racing													3	-
-	(Spain) Alex Palou (Germany) Fabian Schiller (Germany) Luca Stolz	(United States) Mercedes-AMG Team Lone Star Racing													13	-
-	(Brazil) Augusto Farfus (United Kingdom) Dan Harper (Germany) Max Hesse	(Belgium) Team WRT													18	-
Pro-Am class
1	(United States) Robby Foley (United States) Justin Rothberg	(United States) Turner Motorsport	5	8	4	4	6	4	Ret	8	4	15	8	4	8	228
2	(United States) Neil Verhagen (Canada) Samantha Tan	(Canada) ST Racing	4	3	3	**6**	2	**3**	6	6	9	4	12	7	19	223
3	(Switzerland) Philip Ellis (United States) Jeff Burton	(United States) DXDT Racing	8	7												187
3	(Switzerland) Philip Ellis (United States) Jeff Burton	(United States) Regulator Racing			**5**	11	12	12	**7**	1	7	8	**9**	3	9	187
4	(United States) Bryan Sellers	(United States) DXDT Racing	7	4	Ret	10	7	15	11	7	14	2	6	8	14	156
5	(Australia) Tom Sargent (United States) Kyle Washington	(United States) GMG Racing	12‡	10	8	8	10	14	5	**11**	5	11	10	11	23	112
6	(United States) Colin Braun (United States) George Kurtz	(United States) CrowdStrike Racing by Riley Motorsports	**2**	**2**	9	5	5	5	WD	WD						108
7	(United States) Bryson Morris	(United States) DXDT Racing									14	2	6	8	14	90
8	(United States) Andy Lee (United States) Elias Sabo	(United States) Flying Lizard Motorsports	10	9	10	12†	11	11	9	WD	10	10	15	14	17	84
9	(United States) Trent Hindman (United States) Jake Pedersen	(United States) RennSport1					3	8			13	9	7	10		74
10	(United States) Scott Smithson	(United States) DXDT Racing	7	4	Ret	10	7	15	11	7						66
11	(United States) Patrick Gallagher	(United States) Turner Motorsport													8	50
12	(Italy) Riccardo Agostini (Brazil) Custodio Toledo	(Italy) AF Corse					**8**	10					13	9	15	50
13	(United States) Will Harderman	(United States) Mercedes-AMG Austin with Esses Racing	6	11			13	13	8	10						41
14	(United Kingdom) Adam Carroll	(United States) Mercedes-AMG Austin with Esses Racing	6	11					8	10						38
15	(Finland) Elias Seppänen	(United States) Regulator Racing													9	36
16	(United States) Ross Chouest (Canada) Aaron Povoledo	(United States) Chouest Povoledo Racing	11‡	12	Ret	9	14	9	DNS	12	WD	WD	11	WD	WD	36
17	(Finland) Toni Vilander (Brazil) Oswaldo Negri Jr. (United States) Jay Schreibman	(Italy) AF Corse													10	30
18	(Canada) Kyle Marcelli (Canada) Jean-Frederic Laberge	(Canada) Montreal Motorsport Group									6	12	Ret	12	WD	25
19	(United States) Blake McDonald	(United States) DXDT Racing													14	24
20	(Monaco) Cédric Sbirrazzuoli	(Italy) AF Corse													15	20
21	(United Kingdom) Nick Yelloly	(United States) Flying Lizard Motorsports													17	16
22	(United States) John Capestro-Dubets	(Canada) ST Racing													19	12
23	(United States) Alan Metni	(United States) Mercedes-AMG Austin with Esses Racing					13	13								3
-	(Turkey) Ayhancan Güven	(United States) GMG Racing													23	0
Drivers ineligible to score points
-	(Switzerland) Patric Niederhauser (Netherlands) Loek Hartog (Hong Kong) Antares Au	(Germany) Herberth Motorsport													**7**	-
-	(Switzerland) Alex Fontana (Switzerland) Yannick Mettler (United States) Ashish Patel	(Germany) Car Collection Motorsport													12	-
-	(Denmark) Bastian Buus (New Zealand) Brendon Leitch (Malaysia) Adrian D'Silva	(New Zealand) Earl Bamber Motorsport													16	-
-	(Austria) Lucas Auer (Australia) Jayden Ojeda (Australia) Kenny Habul	(Australia) SunEnergy1 Racing													20	-
-	(India) Arjun Maini (Australia) Jordan Love (Malaysia) Prince Jefri Ibrahim	(Australia) Triple Eight Race Engineering													22	-
Am class
1	(United States) Jay Schreibman (Brazil) Oswaldo Negri Jr.	(Italy) AF Corse									11	13	14	Ret		68
2	(United States) Alan Metni (United States) Will Harderman	(United States) Mercedes-AMG Austin with Esses Racing									**8**	14				43
Pos.	Driver	Team	SON		SEB		COT		VIR		ELK		BAR		IND	Points

Key
Colour	Result
Gold	Race winner
Silver	2nd place
Bronze	3rd place
Green	Points finish
Blue	Non-points finish
Blue	Non-classified finish (NC)
Purple	Did not finish (Ret)
Black	Disqualified (DSQ)
Black	Excluded (EX)
White	Did not start (DNS)
White	Race cancelled (C)
White	Withdrew (WD)
Blank	Did not participate

**Bold** – Pole
Italics – Fastest Lap

Notes

- † – Drivers did not finish the race but were classified, as they completed more than 75% of the race distance.
- ‡ – Post-event penalty. Car moved to back of class.

== See also ==
- 2024 GT World Challenge Europe
- 2024 GT World Challenge Europe Endurance Cup
- 2024 GT World Challenge Europe Sprint Cup
- 2024 GT World Challenge Asia
- 2024 GT World Challenge Australia
