= Tunku Abu Bakar =

Malaysian racing driver (born 2001)

Tunku Putera of Johor
- Tenure: 22 November 2012 – present
- Proclamation: 22 November 2012
- Born: 30 May 2001 (age 25); Johor Bahru, Johor, Malaysia
Names
- Tunku Abu Bakar Mahmood Iskandar Ibrahim ibni Sultan Ibrahim
Regnal name
- Tunku Abu Bakar Al-Haj ibni Sultan Ibrahim
- House: Temenggong
- Father: Sultan Ibrahim
- Mother: Raja Zarith Sofiah
- Religion: Sunni Islam
- Military career
- Allegiance: Sultan of Johor

Tunku Abu Bakar Al-Haj ibni Sultan Ibrahim (born 30 May 2001), also known as Prince Abu Bakar Ibrahim, is a member of the Johor royal family. He is the youngest son of Sultan Ibrahim and Raja Zarith Sofiah. He is also the grandson of both Sultan Iskandar of Johor and Sultan Idris Shah II of Perak.

Tunku Abu Bakar is a racing driver. He also emerged as the runner-up of the GT3 Drivers' Championship during the GT World Challenge Asia 2023 Race, which took place at the Sepang International Circuit on 24 September 2023.

== Background ==
Tunku Abu Bakar is the youngest child of Sultan Ibrahim, the current Sultan of Johor and Raja Zarith Sofiah, the Permaisuri of Johor. His parents are also the current Yang di-Pertuan Agong (King of Malaysia) and the Raja Permaisuri Agong (Queen of Malaysia).

== Racing record ==
Prince Abu Bakar Ibrahim
- Nationality: (Malaysia) Malaysian
- Categorisation: FIA Silver

=== Career summary ===
Season	Series	Team	Races	Wins	Poles	F/Laps	Podiums	Points	Position
2022	GT World Challenge Asia - GT3	Triple Eight JMR	10	0	0	0	1	62	9th
2023	GT World Challenge Asia - GT3	Triple Eight JMR	12	2	1	1	6	137	2nd
2024	GT World Challenge Asia	Triple Eight JMR	12	0	3	0	2	83	5th
2025	GT World Challenge Asia	Johor Motorsport Racing JMR	12	0	0	0	2	63	13th
2025	International GT Open	Johor Motorsport Racing JMR	1	0	0	0	0	0	78th
2025	GT World Challenge Europe Endurance Cup	Johor Motorsport Racing JMR	1	0	0	0	0	0	NC
2025–26	Asian Le Mans Series - GT	Johor Motorsports Racing JMR							
2026	GT World Challenge Europe Endurance Cup	Johor Motorsports Racing JMR							

=== Complete Spa 24 Hour results ===
Year	Team	Co-drivers	Car	Class	Laps	Ovr. Pos.	Class Pos.
2025	Johor Motorsports Racing JMR	(Malaysia) Tunku Abdul Rahman Hassanal Jefri (Australia) Jordan Love (United Kingdom) Alexander Sims	Chevrolet Corvette Z06 GT3.R	B	527	43rd	

== Honours ==
Styles of Tunku Abu Bakar Al-Haj
- Reference style: His Highness
- Spoken style: Your Highness
- Alternative style: Tunku

=== Johor ===
- First Class of the Royal Family Order of Johor (DK I) (22 November 2012)
- Knight Grand Commander of the Order of the Crown of Johor (SPMJ) – Dato' (15 March 2015)
- Grand Knight of the Order of Sultan Ibrahim of Johor (SMIJ) – Dato' (30 March 2015)
- First Class of the Sultan Ibrahim Medal (PIS I)
- First Class of the Sultan Ibrahim Medal (PSI I) (23 March 2017)
- Sultan Ibrahim Coronation Medal (23 March 2015)

=== National ===
- Malaysia
  - Recipient of the 16th Yang di-Pertuan Agong Installation Medal (30 July 2019)
  - Recipient of the 17th Yang di-Pertuan Agong Installation Medal (20 July 2024)
