= Tunku Abdul Rahman Hassanal Jefri =

Malaysian racing driver (born 1993)

Tunku Abdul Rahman تونكو عبد الرحمن

Tunku Panglima of Johor (Prince Panglima of Johor)
- Tenure: 22 November 2012 – present
- Proclamation: 22 November 2012
- Born: 5 February 1993 (age 33); Johor Bahru, Johor, Malaysia
Names
- Tunku Abdul Rahman Hassanal Jefri ibni Tunku Ibrahim Ismail
Regnal name
- Tunku Abdul Rahman Al-Haj ibni Sultan Ibrahim
- House: Temenggong
- Father: Sultan Ibrahim
- Mother: Raja Zarith Sofiah
- Religion: Sunni Islam
- Military career
- Other name: Prince Jefri Ibrahim
- Allegiance: Sultan of Johor
- Branch: Royal Johor Military Force (JMF)
- Rank: Colonel

Tunku Abdul Rahman Al-Haj ibni Sultan Ibrahim (Jawi: تونكو عبد الرحمن; né Tunku Abdul Rahman Hassanal Jefri ibni Tunku Ibrahim Ismail, born 5 February 1993), also known as Prince Jefri Ibrahim, is a member of the Johor royal family who is the Tunku Panglima of Johor. He is the third son of Sultan Ibrahim and Raja Zarith Sofiah. He is also the grandson of both Sultan Iskandar of Johor and Sultan Idris Shah II of Perak.

Tunku Abdul Rahman is also a racing driver. He is contracted to Triple Eight Race Engineering where he competes in Asian and Australian GT3 championships.

In 2019, Tunku Abdul Rahman made his debut as a racing driver in the 2019 Blancpain GT World Challenge Asia Series for the Johor Motorsport Racing team and recorded numerous successes in the sport.

== Background ==
Tunku Abdul Rahman Hassanal Jefri is the fifth child and fourth son of His Majesty Sultan Ibrahim, the current Sultan of Johor and Her Majesty Raja Zarith Sofiah, the Permaisuri of Johor. His parents are also the current Yang di-Pertuan Agong (King) and the Raja Permaisuri Agong (Queen consort) of Malaysia.

At the age of 17, Tunku Abdul Rahman Hassanal Jefri, who was the youngest Royal Johor Military Force officer (ATSNJ), was assigned as the Flag Officer at the 52nd Birthday Celebration Ceremony of the Sultan of Johor. He is a Colonel in the ATSNJ, in addition to serving as an Observer Member of the Johor Royal Council.

== Racing record ==
Prince Jefri Ibrahim
- Nationality: (Malaysia) Malaysian
- Categorisation: FIA Silver (2019–2022); FIA Bronze (2023–)

=== Career summary ===
Season	Series	Team	Races	Wins	Poles	F/Laps	Podiums	Points	Position
2021	GT World Challenge Australia - Pro-Am	Triple Eight Race Engineering	8	1	2	2	7	121	**3rd**
2022	GT World Challenge Asia - GT3	Triple Eight JMR	10	2	0	1	5	123	**2nd**
2022	GT World Challenge Asia - Pro-Am Cup	Triple Eight JMR	10	3	0	1	6	158	**1st**
2022	GT World Challenge Australia - Pro-Am	JMR Triple Eight Race Engineering	8	4	1	0	7	130	**3rd**
2022	Intercontinental GT Challenge	Triple Eight Race Engineering	1	0	0	0	1	15	15th
2023	GT World Challenge Asia - GT3	Triple Eight JMR	12	0	0	0	0	7	36th
2023	GT World Challenge Asia - Pro-Am Cup	Triple Eight JMR	12	0	0	0	0	13	33rd
2023	GT World Challenge Australia - Pro-Am	Triple Eight Race Engineering	8	0	0	0	3	91	7th
2023	Intercontinental GT Challenge	Triple Eight Race Engineering	1	0	0	0	0	N/A	NC
2023-24	Asian Le Mans Series - GT	Triple Eight JMR	5	2	0	0	2	74	**2nd**
2024	GT World Challenge Australia - Pro-Am	Johor Motorsports Racing							
2024	GT World Challenge Europe Endurance Cup	Triple Eight JMR	1	0	0	0	0	0	NC
2024	Intercontinental GT Challenge	Triple Eight JMR							
2024	International GT Open	Triple Eight JMR	1	0	0	0	0	0	41st
2024	GT World Challenge America - Pro-Am	Triple Eight JMR	1	0	0	0	0	0	NC†
2025	GT World Challenge Asia	Johor Motorsport Racing JMR	12	3	2	0	4	122	**3rd**
2025	GT World Challenge Asia - Pro-Am	Johor Motorsport Racing JMR	12	3	2	0	6	154	**2nd**
2025	International GT Open	Johor Motorsport Racing JMR	1	0	0	0	0	0	78th
2025	GT World Challenge Europe Endurance Cup	Johor Motorsport Racing JMR	1	0	0	0	0	0	NC
2025-26	Asian Le Mans Series - GT	Johor Motorsports Racing JMR							
2026	GT World Challenge Europe Endurance Cup	Johor Motorsports Racing JMR							

=== Complete GT World Challenge Asia results ===
(key) (Races in bold indicate pole position) (Races in italics indicate fastest lap)

Year	Team	1	2	3	4	5	6	7	8	9	10	11	12	DC	Points
2022	Triple Eight JMR	SEP; 1; 1	SEP; 2; 5	SUZ; 1; 3	SUZ; 2; 2	FUJ; 1; 4	FUJ; 2; 1	SUG; 1; 9	SUG; 2; 10	OKA; 1; 3	OKA; 2; 13			2nd	123
2023	Triple Eight JMR	BUR; 1; 11	BUR; 2; 15	FUJ; 1; 7	FUJ; 2; 13	SUZ; 1; 22	SUZ; 2; 18	MOT; 1; 11	MOT; 2; 13	OKA; 1; 18	OKA; 2; 12	SEP; 1; 11	SEP; 2; 11	36th	7
2025	Johor Motorsports Racing JMR	SEP; 1; 4	SEP; 2; 1	MAN; 1; 11	MAN; 2; 10	BUR; 1; 4	**BUR**; **2**; 1	FUJ; 1; 8	**FUJ**; **2**; 1	OKA; 1; 17	OKA; 2 Ret	BEI; 1; 12	BEI; 2; 2	3rd	122

=== Complete Asian Le Mans Series results ===
(key) (Races in bold indicate pole position; results in italics indicate fastest lap)

Year	Entrant	Class	Chassis	1	2	3	4	5	6	Rank	Points
2023–24	Triple Eight JMR	GT	Mercedes-AMG GT3 Evo	SEP; 1; 7	SEP; 2; 6	DUB; 5	ABU; 1; 1	ABU; 2; 1		2nd	74
2025–26	Johor Motorsports JMR	GT	Chevrolet Corvette Z06 GT3.R	SEP; 1; 9	SEP; 2; 12	DUB; 1; 13	DUB; 2; 11	ABU; 1; 12	ABU; 2 Ret	25th	2

^{*} Season still in progress.

=== Complete Bathurst 12 Hour results ===
Year	Team	Co-drivers	Car	Class	Laps	Ovr. Pos.	Class Pos.
2022	Triple Eight Race Engineering	(Australia) Broc Feeney (New Zealand) Shane van Gisbergen	Mercedes-AMG GT3 Evo	APA	291	**3rd**	**3rd**
2023	Triple Eight Race Engineering	(New Zealand) Richie Stanaway (Australia) Jamie Whincup	Mercedes-AMG GT3 Evo	**PA**	319	10th	**3rd**
2024	Triple Eight Race Engineering	(Australia) Jordan Love (Australia) Jamie Whincup	Mercedes-AMG GT3 Evo	**PA**	274	11th	**3rd**

=== Complete Spa 24 Hour results ===
Year	Team	Co-drivers	Car	Class	Laps	Ovr. Pos.	Class Pos.
2024	Triple Eight Race Engineering	(Austria) Martin Konrad (Australia) Jordan Love (United Kingdom) Alexander Sims	Mercedes-AMG GT3 Evo	**PA**	114	DNF	
2025	Johor Motorsports Racing JMR	(Malaysia) Prince Abu Bakar Ibrahim (Australia) Jordan Love (United Kingdom) Alexander Sims	Chevrolet Corvette Z06 GT3.R	**B**	527	43rd	

=== Complete 24 Hours of Le Mans results ===
Year	Team	Co-Drivers	Car	Class	Laps	Pos.	Class Pos.
2026	(United Kingdom) TF Sport	(United Kingdom) Ben Green (United Kingdom) Lorcan Hanafin	Chevrolet Corvette Z06 GT3.R	LMGT3	330	46th	14th

== Honours ==
Styles of Tunku Abdul Rahman Hassanal Jefri
- Reference style: His Highness
- Spoken style: Your Highness
- Alternative style: Tunku

=== Johor ===
- First Class of the Royal Family Order of Johor (DK I) (22 November 2012)
- Knight Grand Commander of the Order of the Crown of Johor (SPMJ) – Dato' (15 March 2015)
- Grand Knight of the Order of Sultan Ibrahim of Johor (SMIJ) – Dato' (30 March 2015)
- Knight Commander of the Order of the Crown of Johor (DPMJ) – Dato' (11 April 2009)
- Medal for Long and Meritorious Service (PJP) (9 April 2026)
- First Class of the Sultan Ibrahim Medal (PIS I)
- First Class of the Sultan Ibrahim Medal (PSI I) (23 March 2017)
- Sultan Ibrahim Coronation Medal (23 March 2015)
- Golden Jubilee of the Grup Gerak Khas Medal - Gold Medal

=== National ===
- Malaysia
  - Recipient of the 16th Yang di-Pertuan Agong Installation Medal (30 July 2019)
  - Recipient of the 17th Yang di-Pertuan Agong Installation Medal (20 July 2024)

== Ancestry ==
Ancestors of Tunku Abdul Rahman Hassanal Jefri

16. Sultan Ibrahim bin Abu Bakar of Johor
8. Sultan Ismail bin Ibrahim of Johor
17. Ungku Maimuna binti Ungku Abdul Majid
4. Sultan Iskandar bin Ismail of Johor
18. Ungku Ahmad bin Ungku Muhammad Khalid
9. Ungku Tun Amina binti Ungku Ahmad
19. Ungku Khadija binti Ungku Muhammad
2. Sultan Ibrahim Ismail of Johor
20. Henry David Trevorrow
10. Reginald George Trevorrow
21. Florence Louisa Capling
5. Enche' Besar Hajjah Kalsum binti Abdullah (née Josephine Ruby Trevorrow)
22. Thomas Alderman
11. Ruby May Alderman
1. Tunku Abdul Rahman Hassanal Jefri
24. Sultan Idris Shah I of Perak
12. Sultan Iskandar bin Idris of Perak
25. Cik Ngah Manah binti Manda Duwayat
6. Sultan Idris Shah II of Perak
26. Raja Kulop Muhammad Kramat bin Raja Alang Iskandar
13. Raja Puteh Umi Kalsum binti Raja Kulop Muhammad Kramat
27. Che Ken Uda Sari binti Abdul Rahman
3. Raja Zarith Sofiah binti Idris
28. Raja Haji Harun al-Rashid bin Idris Murshid
14. Raja Arif Shah bin Raja Haji Harun al-Rashid
29. Cik Haji Ngah Uteh Mariah binti Haji Sulaiman
7. Raja Muzwin binti Raja Arif Shah
30. Abdullah
15. Cik Puan Aziza binti Abdullah
