= Bastian Buus =

Danish racing driver (born 2003)

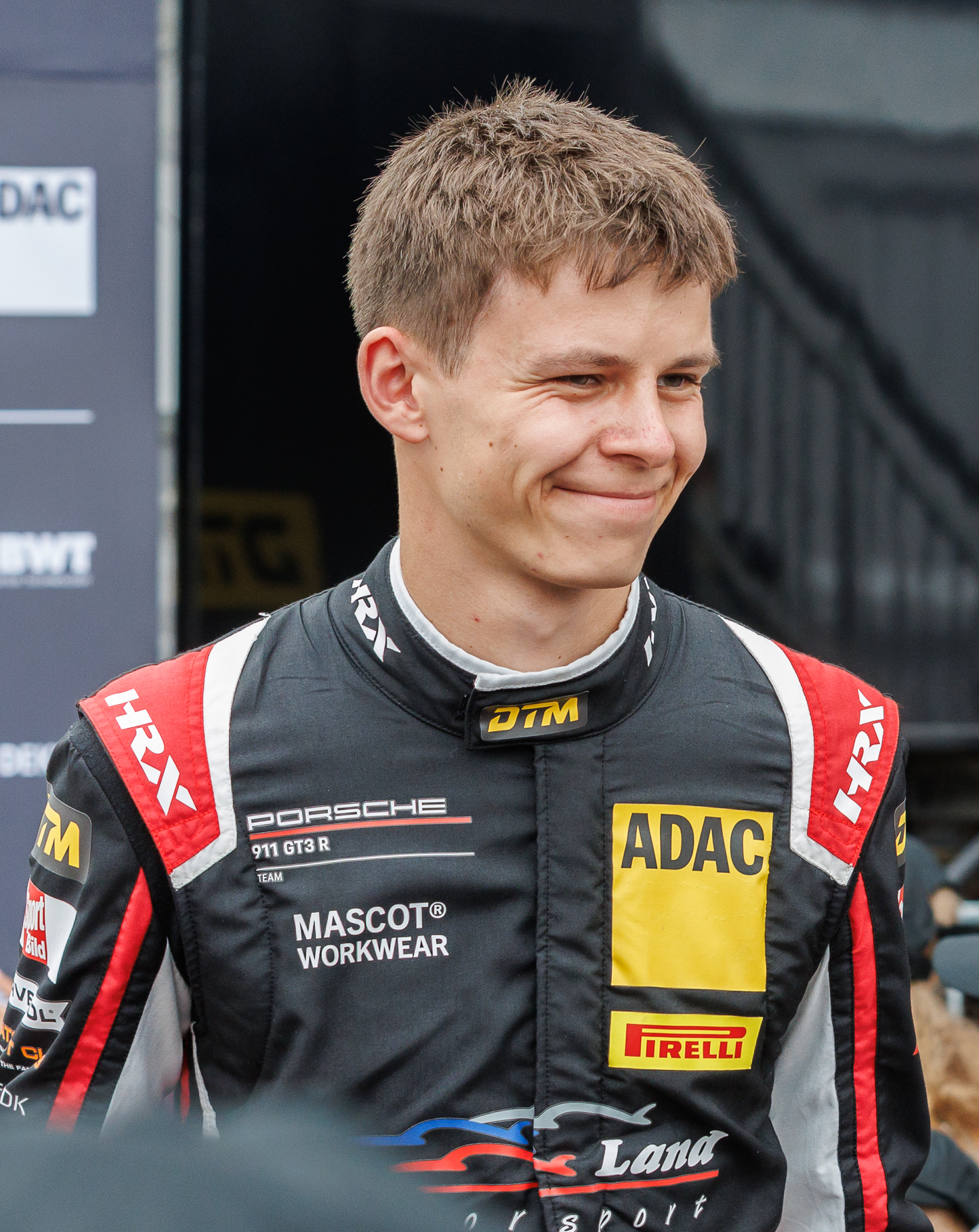
- Buus in 2026
- Nationality: (Denmark) Danish
- Born: 20 June 2003 (age 23) Kolding, Denmark

Porsche Supercup career
- Debut season: 2022
- Current team: BWT Lechner Racing
- Categorisation: FIA Silver (until 2022); FIA Gold (2023–2025); FIA Platinum (2026–)
- Starts: 14 (14 entries)
- Wins: 3
- Podiums: 7
- Poles: 1
- Fastest laps: 4
- Best finish: 1st in 2023

Bastian Buus (born 20 June 2003) is a Danish racing driver who currently competes in the Deutsche Tourenwagen Masters for Land-Motorsport. He is a part of the Porsche Junior Program. He also is a Team Danmark athlete. Buus is the winner of the 2026 GT World Challenge Europe Sprint Cup and the 2023 Porsche Supercup.

== Early career ==
=== Karting ===
Buus biggest achievement was coming second place in the 2015 Danish Championship - Cadet Junior class and winning DKL (Danish Karting League) in OKJ class in 2017. He also participated in various WSK events, including the WSK Super Master Series, WSK Final Cup and WSK Open Series. He finished 9th in the WSK Final Cup - OKJ class in 2017.

=== Aquila Synergy Cup ===
In 2018, Buus made his debut in the Aquila Synergy Cup, where he achieved much for success then he did in karting. He won nine races and got 14 podiums out of the 15 races he was in, with three poles and eight fastest laps, he came second in the championship with 450 points.

=== GT4 European Series ===
Buus's first appearance in GT4's was competing in the 2020 GT4 European Series Pro-Am class full time for Allied-Racing alongside Jan Kasperlik. The pair beat former Formula 2 driver and current Super Formula driver, Cem Bölükbaşı and Yağız Gedik to the Pro-Am title, winning eight out of 12 races.

Buus contested the final round of the 2021 GT4 European Series with Allied Racing, partnering Joel Sturm in the Silver class. The pair won a race that lifted Buus to being classified as 17th in the championship standings with 25 points.

=== DTM Trophy ===
Buus made an appearance for Allied Racing for the second to last round of the 2020 DTM Trophy in Zolder, replacing Felix Hirsiger. He scored 12 points in the two races he drove in.

== Porsche competition ==
Buus made his Porsche Carrera Cup debut in the 2020 Porsche Carrera Cup Germany in a one-off guest appearance in the final round in Oschersleben, he was unable to start the first race but came 11th in the second race.

In 2021, Buus competed in the Porsche Carrera Cup Germany full time, as he fought for the rookie title and also fought for podiums in the overall standings, getting his maiden podium in race 1 of the second race in Monza, and another podium in the final race of the final round of the championship in Hockenheim. He finished the championship in seventh with 120 points. Buus was pipped to the rookie title by Loek Hartog, as the Dane was runner up to the rookie classification.

For his 2022 campaign, Buus competed full time in the Porsche Carrera Cup Germany and in the 2022 Porsche Carrera Cup France for Allied Racing. He achieved his maiden win in the Porsche Carrera Cup Germany in the first race at Imola, and got his maiden pole in the first race of Lausitzring. He finished his campaign in fourth with eight podiums and 236 points.

In the Porsche Carrera Cup France, Buus didn't win any races but got five podiums and won the rookie classification, finishing his maiden season with 137 points in fourth.

Buus contested the 2022 Porsche Supercup season with BWT Lechner Racing, partnering Dylan Pereira and Harry King. He achieved his first podium in the Red Bull Ring and got his first pole and win in Circuit Paul Ricard. Buus won the final race of the season in Monza, finishing his rookie season in fourth place with 120 points, while also winning the rookie classification.

In 2023, Buus remained in the Porsche Supercup with BWT Lechner Racing and the Porsche Carrera Cup Germany with Allied Racing. He won the 2023 Porsche Supercup title and took his first win in his campaign at the Red Bull Ring. Buus finished with 122 points, five podiums and one win.

Meanwhile, in the Porsche Carrera Cup Germany, Buus came third in the championship after getting three wins, nine podiums, one pole position and 239 points.

== GT3 career ==
=== GT World Challenge Europe Endurance Cup ===
In 2021, Buus joined his regular team Allied Racing for three races, starting from the 24 Hours of Spa in the GT World Challenge Europe Endurance Cup - Silver Cup, where Buus came ninth in his category, he came 14th at the Nürburgring and 15th in the Circuit de Barcelona-Catalunya.

Buus rejoined the championship in 2024, competing with Lionspeed GP. He competed in the bronze category, and got one podium at the third round at the Nürburgring. Buus retired from the final two races of the season at Monza and Jeddah, getting his maiden fastest lap in the latter.

With Lionspeed GP, Buus, Thomas Preining and Ricardo Feller fielded a Pro entry in the 2026 GT World Challenge Europe Endurance Cup, they took their first win in the third round, also doubling as the 2026 24 Hours of Spa. The trio got their second podium in the final race at the Algarve International Circuit and came third in the overall standings.

=== Asian Le Mans Series ===
Buus made his debut in the series for Earl Bamber Motorsport in the GT class of the 2023–24 season, where he partnered Thai racing driver Tanart Sathienthirakul, and Indonesian racing driver Setiawan Santoso. He had a best result of 11th in the first round of the championship at the Sepang International Circuit. He and his teammates came 29th in the championship.

=== Intercontinental GT Challenge ===
Buus did three races in the 2024 Intercontinental GT Challenge, first in the 2024 Bathurst 12 Hour where he got his only podium after getting third in his category, he also drove in the 2024 24 Hours of Nürburgring, coming 13th in the race, but ninth in IGTC standings. Buus finished his season with an 11th place at 2024 Indianapolis 8 Hours. He finished the championship in 15th with 16 points.

=== GT World Challenge Asia ===
Buus also completed in the 2024 GT World Challenge Asia with Phantom Global Racing for the first two rounds. He came fourth and 19th in the first round at the Sepang International Circuit, and came 15th and seventh in the next round at Buriram International Circuit. Buus returned to the series in the fifth round of the series at Okayama International Circuit with Origine Motorsport. He came fifth and fourth in the races and got his first pole position in the second race. Buus came 17th in the drivers championship with 40 points.

=== Deutsche Tourenwagen Masters ===
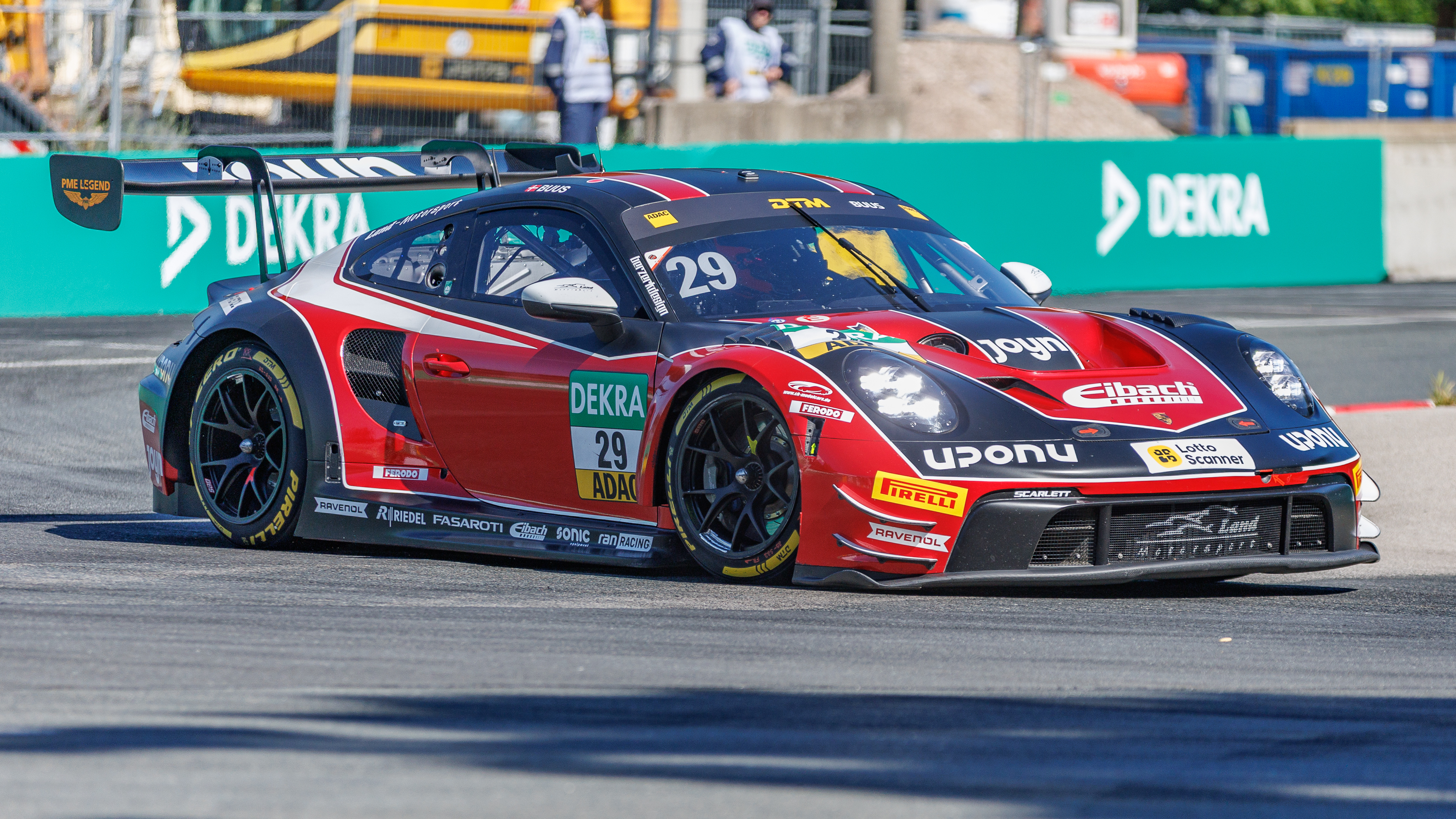
Buus competing with a Porsche 911 GT3 R (992) in the 2026 DTM round at Norisring

For 2025, Buus was set to compete in the 2025 Deutsche Tourenwagen Masters with Allied Racing, partnering Ricardo Feller. However, the team shuttered its program prior to the start of the season.

With Land-Motorsport, he made his debut in the Deutsche Tourenwagen Masters for the 2026 season. His best weekend by far was in the final round at the Hockenheimring, where he got his first pole position, which he converted to a best result of fourth.

=== GT World Challenge Europe Sprint Cup ===
Buus made GT World Challenge Europe Sprint Cup debut in the 2025 season, partnering Bashar Mardini in the Bronze class where the duo drove for Lionspeed GP. They took class wins at Zandvoort, – including an overall pole position, – Magny-Cours, and Valencia, but ultimately ended up five points off the title, being bested by Kessel Racing's Dustin Blattner and Dennis Marschall.

The Dane remained with Lionspeed for his 2026 campaign but moved up from Bronze to Pro, where he also partnered Swiss Ricardo Feller. He and Feller started the opening round at Brands Hatch on double pole, and won the second race. The following race they achieved a podium at Misano, and then a second win in the final race of the third round at Magny-Cours. In the penultimate round at Zandvoort, the duo took a podium in the second race. Buus started the first race of the final round at Barcelona on pole, and converted it to a podium, therefore taking the 2026 GT World Challenge Europe Sprint Cup overall title with Feller.

== Personal life ==
Buus currently resides in Nørre Bjert, Kolding Municipality together with his family.

== Karting record ==
=== Karting career summary ===
Season	Series	Team	Position
2014	Danish Championship – Cadet Junior		8th
2015	Danish Championship – Cadet Junior		2nd
2016	Danish Championship – KFJ		9th
2016	NEZ Championship – KFJ		8th
2017	WSK Super Master Series – OKJ		38th
2017	WSK Final Cup – OKJ		9th
2017	Rotax Max Challenge Denmark – Junior		39th
2018	DKM German Kart Championship – OK	RS Competition	14th
2018	Swedish Kart League – OK		27th
2019	24° South Garda Winter Cup – OK	RS Competition	23rd
2019	WSK Super Master Series – OK	RS Competition	19th
2019	DKM German Kart Championship – OK	RS Competition	12th
2019	WSK Open Cup – OK	RS Competition	16th

== Racing record ==
=== Racing career summary ===
Season	Series	Team	Races	Wins	Poles	F/Laps	Podiums	Points	Position
2018	Aquila Synergy Cup		15	9	3	8	14	450	**2nd**
2020	DTM Trophy	Allied Racing	2	0	0	0	0	12	18th
2020	GT4 European Series - Pro-Am	Allied Racing	12	8	4	3	9	240	**1st**
2020	Porsche Carrera Cup Germany	Allied Racing	1	0	0	0	0	0	NC
2021	GT4 European Series - Silver	Allied Racing	2	1	0	1	1	25	17th
2021	GT World Challenge Europe Endurance Cup	Allied Racing	3	0	0	0	0	0	NC
2021	GT World Challenge Europe Endurance Cup - Silver	Allied Racing	3	0	0	0	0	2	32nd
2021	Porsche Carrera Cup Germany	Allied Racing	16	0	0	1	2	120	7th
2022	Porsche Carrera Cup Germany	Allied Racing	16	1	1	0	8	236	4th
2022	Porsche Carrera Cup France	Allied Racing	10	0	0	1	5	137	4th
2022	Porsche Supercup	BWT Lechner Racing	8	2	1	0	3	120	4th
2023	Porsche Carrera Cup Germany	Allied-Racing	16	3	1	5	9	239	**3rd**
2023	Porsche Supercup	BWT Lechner Racing	8	1	0	4	5	122	**1st**
2023–24	Asian Le Mans Series - GT	Earl Bamber Motorsport	5	0	0	0	0	0	29th
2024	Intercontinental GT Challenge	Phantom Global Racing	1	0	0	1	1	16	15th
2024	Intercontinental GT Challenge	Dinamic GT	1	0	0	0	0	16	15th
2024	Intercontinental GT Challenge	EBM	1	0	0	0	0	16	15th
2024	GT World Challenge Asia	AAS Phantom Global Racing	4	0	0	0	0	40	17th
2024	GT World Challenge Asia	Origine Motorsport	2	0	1	0	0	40	17th
2024	GT World Challenge Asia - Pro-Am Cup	AAS Phantom Global Racing	4	0	0	0	1	67	13th
2024	GT World Challenge Asia - Pro-Am Cup	Origine Motorsport	2	0	2	0	2	67	13th
2024	GT World Challenge Europe Endurance Cup	Lionspeed GP	4	0	0	0	0	0	NC
2024	GT World Challenge Europe Endurance Cup - Bronze	Lionspeed GP	4	0	0	1	1	20	19th
2024	Nürburgring Langstrecken-Serie - SP9	Dinamic GT	2	0	0	0	0	0	NC†
2024	24 Hours of Nürburgring - SP9	Dinamic GT	1	0	0	0	0	N/A	13th
2024	Nürburgring Langstrecken-Serie - AT(-G)	Four Motors Bioconcept-Car	1	0	0	0	0	0	NC†
2024	GT World Challenge America - Pro-Am	Earl Bamber Motorsport	1	0	0	0	0	0	NC†
2025	GT World Challenge Asia	Origine Motorsport	8	1	1	0	3	82	7th
2025	GT World Challenge Asia - Pro-Am Cup	Origine Motorsport	8	2	1	0	3	110	6th
2025	GT World Challenge Europe Sprint Cup	Lionspeed GP	8	0	1	0	0	1.5	27th
2025	GT World Challenge Europe Sprint Cup - Bronze	Lionspeed GP	8	3	1	1	5	87	2nd
2025	Nürburgring Langstrecken-Serie - SP9	Dinamic GT	5	0	0	0	0	16	NC†
2025	24 Hours of Nürbugring - SP9	Dinamic GT	1	0	0	0	1	N/A	**3rd**
2025	GT World Challenge Europe Endurance Cup	Dinamic GT	1	0	0	0	0	0	NC
2025	GT World Challenge Europe Endurance Cup	UNX Racing	1	0	0	0	0	0	NC
2026	Deutsche Tourenwagen Masters	Land-Motorsport	16	0	1	2	0	66	16th
2026	Nürburgring Langstrecken-Serie - SP9	Dinamic GT							
2026	24 Hours of Nürbugring - SP9	Dinamic GT	1	0	0	0	0	N/A	5th
2026	GT World Challenge Asia	AAS by Absolute Racing	2	0	1	0	0	0	NC
2026	GT World Challenge Europe Endurance Cup	Lionspeed GP	5	1	0	0	2	48	**3rd**
2026	GT World Challenge Europe Sprint Cup	Lionspeed GP	10	2	3	1	5	72	**1st**
2026	Intercontinental GT Challenge	Absolute Racing	1	0	0	0	0	47	6th
2026	Intercontinental GT Challenge	Dinamic GT	1	0	0	0	0	47	6th
2026	Intercontinental GT Challenge	Lionspeed GP	1	1	0	0	1	47	6th

* Season still in progress.

† As Buus was a guest driver, he was ineligible for points.

=== Complete GT4 European Series results ===
(key) (Races in bold indicate pole position) (Races in italics indicate fastest lap)

Year	Team	Car	Class	1	2	3	4	5	6	7	8	9	10	11	12	Pos	Points
2020	Allied Racing	Porsche 718 Cayman GT4 Clubsport	Pro-Am	IMO; 1; 6	IMO; 2; 3	MIS; 1; 11	MIS; 2; 5	NÜR; 1; 4	**NÜR**; **2**; 1	**ZAN**; **1**; 1	**ZAN**; **2**; 1	**SPA**; **1**; 2	SPA; 2 Ret	LEC; 1; 13	LEC; 2; 12	1st	240
2021	Allied Racing	Porsche 718 Cayman GT4 Clubsport	Silver	MNZ; 1	MNZ; 2	LEC; 1	LEC; 2	ZAN; 1	ZAN; 2	SPA; 1	SPA; 2	NÜR; 1	NÜR; 2	CAT; 1; 28	CAT; 2; 1	17th	25

=== Complete Porsche Carrera Cup Germany results ===
(key) (Races in bold indicate pole position) (Races in italics indicate fastest lap)

Year	Team	1	2	3	4	5	6	7	8	9	10	11	12	13	14	15	16	DC	Points
2020	Allied Racing	LEM; 1	LEM; 2	SAC; 1	SAC; 2	SAC; 3	RBR; 1	RBR; 2	RBR; 3	LAU; 1	LAU; 1	OSC; 1 DNS	OSC; 1; 11					NC	0
2021	Allied Racing	SPA; 1 Ret	SPA; 2; 8	OSC; 1; 9	OSC; 2; 11	RBR; 1; 5	RBR; 2; 5	MNZ1; 1; 9	MNZ1; 2; 19	ZAN; 1; 11	ZAN; 2; 8	MNZ2; 1; 7	MNZ2; 2; 3	SAC; 1; 8	SAC; 2; 8	HOC; 1; 28	HOC; 2; 3	7th	120
2022	Allied-Racing	SPA; 1; 7	SPA; 2; 3	RBR; 1; 6	RBR; 2; 4	IMO; 1; 1	IMO; 2; 7	ZAN; 1; 3	ZAN; 2; 2	NÜR; 1; 2	NÜR; 2; 5	**LAU**; **1**; 6	LAU; 2; 14	SAC; 1; 2	SAC; 2; 6	HOC; 1; 2	**HOC**; **2**; 2	4th	237
2023	Allied-Racing	SPA; 1; 4	SPA; 2; 5	HOC; 1 Ret	HOC; 2; 4	ZAN; 1; 2	ZAN; 2; 2	NÜR; 1; 6	NÜR; 2; 2	LAU; 1; 3	LAU; 2; 1	SAC; 1; 1	**SAC**; **2**; 3	RBR; 1; 3	RBR; 2; 1	HOC; 1; 7	HOC; 2 Ret	3rd	239

=== Complete Porsche Carrera Cup France results ===
(key) (Races in bold indicate pole position) (Races in italics indicate fastest lap)

Year	Team	1	2	3	4	5	6	7	8	9	10	11	12	Pos	Points
2022	Allied-Racing	NOG; 1; 19	NOG; 2; 6	SPA; 1; 3	SPA; 2; 6	MAG; 1; 3	MAG; 2; 3	ZAN; 1	ZAN; 2	VAL; 1; 3	VAL; 2; 4	LEC; 1; 4	LEC; 2; 3	4th	137

=== Complete Porsche Supercup results ===
(key) (Races in bold indicate pole position; races in italics indicate fastest lap)

Year	Team	1	2	3	4	5	6	7	8	Pos.	Points
2022	BWT Lechner Racing	IMO; 5	MON; 9	SIL; 5	RBR; 3	**LEC**; 1	SPA; 6	ZND; 4	MNZ; 1	4th	120
2023	BWT Lechner Racing	MON; 3	RBR; 1	SIL; 13	HUN; 3	SPA; 2	ZND; 4	ZND; 2	MNZ; 13	1st	122

=== Complete GT World Challenge Europe results ===
==== GT World Challenge Europe Endurance Cup ====
(key) (Races in bold indicate pole position) (Races in italics indicate fastest lap)

Year	Team	Car	Class	1	2	3	4	5	6	7	Pos.	Points
2021	Allied-Racing	Porsche 911 GT3 R	Silver	MNZ	LEC	SPA; 6H; 44	SPA; 12H; 41	SPA; 24H; 27	NÜR; 39	CAT; 43	32nd	2
2024	Lionspeed GP	Porsche 911 GT3 R (992)	Bronze	LEC; 30	SPA; 6H	SPA; 12H	SPA; 24H	NÜR; 28	MNZ; Ret	JED; Ret	19th	20
2025	Dinamic GT	Porsche 911 GT3 R (992)	Pro	LEC	MNZ	SPA; 6H; 69†	SPA; 12H; 69†	SPA; 24H; Ret	NÜR		NC	0
2025	UNX Racing	Porsche 911 GT3 R (992)	Bronze							CAT; 46	NC	0
2026	Lionspeed GP	Porsche 911 GT3 R (992.2)	Pro	LEC; Ret	MNZ; Ret	SPA; 6H; 15	SPA; 12H; 5	SPA; 24H; 1	NÜR; 15	ALG; 2	3rd	48

==== GT World Challenge Europe Sprint Cup ====
(key) (Races in bold indicate pole position) (Races in italics indicate fastest lap)

Year	Team	Car	Class	1	2	3	4	5	6	7	8	9	10	Pos.	Points
2025	Lionspeed GP	Porsche 911 GT3 R (992)	Bronze	**ZAN**; **1**; 18	ZAN; 2; 32	MIS; 1; 28	MIS; 2; 29	MAG; 1; 26	MAG; 2; 28	VAL; 1; 10	VAL; 2; 23			2nd	87
2026	Lionspeed GP	Porsche 911 GT3 R (992.2)	Pro	**BRH**; **1** Ret	**BRH**; **2**; 1	MIS; 1; 2	MIS; 2; 20	MAG; 1; 11	MAG; 2; 1	ZAN; 1; 23	ZAN; 2; 2	**CAT**; **1**; 2	CAT; 2; 36	1st	72

=== Complete Asian Le Mans Series results ===
(key) (Races in bold indicate pole position) (Races in italics indicate fastest lap)

Year	Team	Class	Car	Engine	1	2	3	4	5	Pos.	Points
2023–24	Earl Bamber Motorsport	GT	Porsche 911 GT3 R (992)	Porsche M97/80 4.2 L Flat-6	SEP; 1; 11	SEP; 2 Ret	DUB; 12	ABU; 1; 13	ABU; 2 Ret	29th	0

=== Complete Deutsche Tourenwagen Masters results ===
(key) (Races in bold indicate pole position) (Races in italics indicate fastest lap)

Year	Entrant	Chassis	1	2	3	4	5	6	7	8	9	10	11	12	13	14	15	16	Rank	Points
2026	Land-Motorsport	Porsche 911 GT3 R (992.2)	RBR; 1; 14	RBR; 2; 10	ZAN; 1 DSQ	ZAN; 2 Ret	LAU; 1 Ret	LAU; 2; 12	NOR; 1; 13	NOR; 2; 8	OSC; 1; 14	OSC; 2; 10	NÜR; 1; 10	NÜR; 2; 10	SAC; 1 Ret	SAC; 2; 9	HOC; 1 DSQ	**HOC**; **2**; 4^{1}	16th	66
