= 2024 Indianapolis 8 Hours =

Indianapolis 8 Hours (4–6 October 2024)

(United States) 2024 Indianapolis 8 Hours
Event Information
- Round 4 of 4 in the 2024 Intercontinental GT Challenge
- Date: 5 October 2024 Intercontinental GT Challenge
- Location: Speedway, Indiana, United States
- Venue: Indianapolis Motor Speedway

Results
Race 1
Distance	320 laps	780.48 miles (1,256.06 km) km
Pole position	(Germany) No. 10 Herberth Motorsport (driver for session: (Switzerland) Patric Niederhauser ) Herbeth Motorsport	1:22.564
Winner	(Belgium) Charles Weerts (South Africa) Sheldon van der Linde (Belgium) Dries Vanthoor (Belgium) Team WRT	8:00:17.640

The 2024 Indianapolis 8 Hours (also known as the Indianapolis 8 Hour Presented by AWS for sponsorship reasons) was the fifth running of the Indianapolis 8 Hour. It took place from October 4–6, 2024. The race was the fourth and final round of the 2024 Intercontinental GT Challenge and the seventh and final round 2024 GT World Challenge America championships.

== Background ==
The 2024 edition was open only to cars within GT3 regulations. GT4 cars, which had appeared in the first two races, were dropped from the race in an effort to reduce incidents caused by multi-class racing.

Supporting the race weekend were the Pirelli GT4 America Series, the TC America Series, and the GT America Series.

== Entry list ==
No.	Entrant	Car	Class	Driver 1	Driver 2	Driver 3
4	(United States) Mercedes-AMG Team Lone Star Racing	Mercedes-AMG GT3 Evo	P	(Spain) Alex Palou	(Germany) Fabian Schiller	(Germany) Luca Stolz
8	(United States) Flying Lizard Motorsports	BMW M4 GT3	PA	(United States) Andy Lee	(United States) Elias Sabo	(United Kingdom) Nick Yelloly
10	(Germany) Herberth Motorsport	Porsche 911 GT3 R (992)	PA	(Hong Kong) Antares Au	(Netherlands) Loek Hartog	(Switzerland) Patric Niederhauser
21	(Germany) Car Collection Motorsport	Porsche 911 GT3 R (992)	PA	(Switzerland) Alex Fontana	(Germany) Yannick Mettler	(United States) 'Hash'
28	(Canada) ST Racing	BMW M4 GT3	P	(United States) Bill Auberlen	(United States) Varun Choksey	(Austria) Philipp Eng
29	(United States) Turner Motorsport	BMW M4 GT3	PA	(United States) Robby Foley	(United States) Justin Rothberg	(United States) Patrick Gallagher
31	(Belgium) Team WRT	BMW M4 GT3	P	(Belgium) Charles Weerts	(South Africa) Sheldon van der Linde	(Belgium) Dries Vanthoor
32	(United States) GMG Racing	Porsche 911 GT3 R (992)	PA	(Australia) Tom Sargent	(United States) Kyle Washington	(Turkey) Ayhancan Güven
33	(Belgium) Team WRT	BMW M4 GT3	P	(Brazil) Augusto Farfus	(United Kingdom) Dan Harper	(Germany) Max Hesse
38	(Canada) ST Racing	BMW M4 GT3	PA	(Canada) Samantha Tan	(United States) Neil Verhagen	(United States) John Capestro-Dubets
61	(New Zealand) Earl Bamber Motorsport	Porsche 911 GT3 R (992)	PA	(Denmark) Bastian Buus	(Malaysia) Adrian D'Silva	(New Zealand) Brendon Leitch
63	(United States) DXDT Racing	Chevrolet Corvette Z06 GT3.R	P	(United States) Tommy Milner	(United States) Alec Udell	(United Kingdom) Alexander Sims
64	(United States) DXDT Racing	Chevrolet Corvette Z06 GT3.R	PA	(United States) Bryan Sellers	(United States) Patrick Liddy	(United States) Blake McDonald
75	(Australia) SunEnergy1 Racing	Mercedes-AMG GT3 Evo	PA	(Austria) Lucas Auer	(Australia) Kenny Habul	(Australia) Jayden Ojeda
85	(United States) RennSport1	Porsche 911 GT3 R (992)	P	(United States) Trent Hindman	(United States) Jake Pedersen	(Netherlands) Kay van Berlo
88	(Italy) AF Corse	Ferrari 296 GT3	PA	(Italy) Riccardo Agostini	(Brazil) Custodio Toledo	(Monaco) Cedric Sbirrazzuoli
91	(United States) Regulator Racing	Mercedes-AMG GT3 Evo	PA	(United States) Jeff Burton	(Finland) Elias Seppänen	(Switzerland) Philip Ellis
92	(Canada) Montreal Motorsport Group	Porsche 911 GT3 R (992)	PA	(Canada) Jean-Frédéric Laberge	(Canada) Kyle Marcelli	
93	(United States) Racers Edge Motorsports	Acura NSX GT3 Evo22	P	(United States) Luca Mars	(United States) Zach Veach	(Colombia) Gabby Chaves
99	(United States) Random Vandals Racing	BMW M4 GT3	P	(United States) Kenton Koch	(United States) Conor Daly	(United States) Connor De Phillippi
120	(United States) Wright Motorsports	Porsche 911 GT3 R (992)	PA	(United States) Adam Adelson	(United States) Elliott Skeer	(Germany) Laurin Heinrich
130	(Hong Kong) Mercedes-AMG Team GruppeM Racing	Mercedes-AMG GT3 Evo	P	(Germany) Maro Engel	(Andorra) Jules Gounon	(Canada) Mikael Grenier
163	(Italy) AF Corse	Ferrari 296 GT3	PA	(Brazil) Oswaldo Negri Jr.	(United States) Jay Schreibman	(Finland) Toni Vilander
888	(Australia) Triple Eight JMR	Mercedes-AMG GT3 Evo	PA	(Malaysia) Prince Jefri Ibrahim	(India) Arjun Maini	(Australia) Jordan Love

Icon	Class
P	Pro Cup
PA	Pro/Am Cup

== Race result ==
Class winners denoted with bold and ‡.

Pos.	Class	No.	Team / Entrant	Drivers	Car	Laps	Time/Retired
1	Pro	31	(Belgium) Team WRT	(Belgium) Charles Weerts (South Africa) Sheldon van der Linde (Belgium) Dries Vanthoor	BMW M4 GT3	320	8:00:17.640‡
2	Pro	120	(United States) Wright Motorsports	(United States) Adam Adelson (United States) Elliott Skeer (Germany) Laurin Heinrich	Porsche 911 GT3 R (992)	320	+0.260
3	Pro	130	(Hong Kong) Mercedes-AMG Team GruppeM Racing	(Germany) Maro Engel (Andorra) Jules Gounon (Canada) Mikael Grenier	Mercedes-AMG GT3 Evo	320	+20.886
4	Pro	93	(United States) Racers Edge Motorsports	(United States) Luca Mars (United States) Zach Veach (Colombia) Gabby Chaves	Acura NSX GT3 Evo22	320	+53.149
5	Pro	63	(United States) DXDT Racing	(United States) Tommy Milner (United States) Alec Udell (United Kingdom) Alexander Sims	Chevrolet Corvette Z06 GT3.R	320	+1:09.880
6	Pro	85	(United States) RennSport1	(United States) Trent Hindman (United States) Jake Pedersen (Netherlands) Kay van Berlo	Porsche 911 GT3 R (992)	320	+1:10.569
7	Pro-Am	10	(Germany) Herberth Motorsport	(Hong Kong) Antares Au (Netherlands) Loek Hartog (Switzerland) Patric Niederhauser	Porsche 911 GT3 R (992)	319	+1 Lap‡
8	Pro-Am	29	(United States) Turner Motorsport	(United States) Robby Foley (United States) Justin Rothberg (United States) Patrick Gallagher	BMW M4 GT3	318	+2 Laps
9	Pro-Am	91	(United States) DXDT Racing	(United States) Jeff Burton (Finland) Elias Seppänen (Switzerland) Philip Ellis	Mercedes-AMG GT3 Evo	317	+3 Laps
10	Pro-Am	163	(Italy) AF Corse	(Brazil) Oswaldo Negri Jr. (United States) Jay Schreibman (Finland) Toni Vilander	Ferrari 296 GT3	317	+3 Laps
11	Pro	28	(Canada) ST Racing	(United States) Bill Auberlen (United States) Varun Choksey (Austria) Philipp Eng	BMW M4 GT3	316	+4 Laps
12	Pro-Am	21	(Germany) Car Collection Motorsport	(Switzerland) Alex Fontana (Germany) Yannick Mettler (United States) 'Hash'	Porsche 911 GT3 R (992)	315	+5 Laps
13	Pro	4	(United States) Mercedes-AMG Team Lone Star Racing	(Spain) Alex Palou (Germany) Fabian Schiller (Germany) Luca Stolz	Mercedes-AMG GT3 Evo	309	+11 Laps
14	Pro-Am	64	(United States) DXDT Racing	(United States) Bryan Sellers (United States) Patrick Liddy (United States) Blake McDonald	Chevrolet Corvette Z06 GT3.R	308	+12 Laps
15	Pro-Am	88	(Italy) AF Corse	(Italy) Riccardo Agostini (Brazil) Custodio Toledo (Monaco) Cedric Sbirrazzuoli	Ferrari 296 GT3	289	+31 Laps
16	Pro-Am	61	(New Zealand) Earl Bamber Motorsport	(Denmark) Bastian Buus (Malaysia) Adrian D'Silva (New Zealand) Brendon Leitch	Porsche 911 GT3 R (992)	288	+32 Laps
17	Pro-Am	8	(United States) Flying Lizard Motorsports	(United States) Andy Lee (United States) Elias Sabo (United Kingdom) Nick Yelloly	BMW M4 GT3	284	+36 Laps
18	Pro	33	(Belgium) Team WRT	(Brazil) Augusto Farfus (Belgium) Maxime Martin (Belgium) Charles Weerts	BMW M4 GT3	280	+40 Laps
19	Pro-Am	38	(Canada) ST Racing	(United States) Neil Verhagen (Canada) Samantha Tan (United States) John Capestro-Dubets	BMW M4 GT3	278	+42 Laps
20	Pro-Am	75	(Australia) SunEnergy1 Racing	(Austria) Lucas Auer (Australia) Kenny Habul (Australia) Jayden Ojeda	Mercedes-AMG GT3 Evo	251	Rear Axle
21	Pro	99	(United States) Random Vandals Racing	(United States) Kenton Koch (United States) Conor Daly (United States) Connor De Phillippi	BMW M4 GT3	213	Fuel Pump
22	Pro-Am	888	(Australia) Triple Eight JMR	(Malaysia) Prince Jefri Ibrahim (India) Arjun Maini (Australia) Jordan Love	Mercedes-AMG GT3 Evo	143	Mechanical
23	Pro-Am	32	(United States) GMG Racing	(Australia) Tom Sargent (United States) Kyle Washington (Turkey) Ayhancan Güven	Porsche 911 GT3 R (992)	136	Steering
DNS	Pro-Am	50	(United States) Chouest Povoledo Racing	(United States) Ross Chouest (Canada) Aaron Povoledo	Mercedes-AMG GT3 Evo	0	Did not start
DNS	Pro-Am	92	(Canada) Montreal Motorsport Group	(Canada) Jean-Frédéric Laberge (Canada) Kyle Marcelli	Porsche 911 GT3 R (992)	0	Did not start

Intercontinental GT Challenge
Previous race: 2024 24 Hours of Spa	2024 season	Next race: None
