= 2024 Bathurst 12 Hour =

Car endurance race in Australia

(Australia) 2024 Bathurst 12 Hour
Event Information
- Round 1 of 4 in the 2024
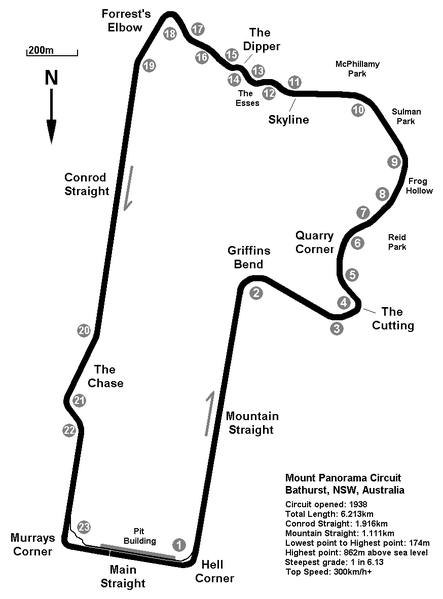
- Date: 16–18 February 2024
- Location: Bathurst, New South Wales, Australia
- Venue: Mount Panorama Circuit

Results
Race 1
Distance	275 laps	1708.575 km
Pole position	(South Africa) Sheldon van der Linde; Team WRT	2:01.9810
Winner	(Australia) Matt Campbell (Turkey) Ayhancan Güven (Belgium) Laurens Vanthoor; Manthey Racing / EMA Motorsport	12:01:22.0968

The 2024 Bathurst 12 Hour (commercially titled 2024 Repco Bathurst 12 Hour) was an endurance race for FIA GT3 cars and invited vehicles, staged at the Mount Panorama Circuit in Bathurst, New South Wales, Australia on 18 February 2024. It was the opening round of seven in the 2024 GT World Challenge Australia and the opening round of four in the 2024 Intercontinental GT Challenge.

This year marked the first year Repco sponsored the race, replacing Künzelsau-based Würth, which had sponsored the race with its Liqui Moly oil brand.

== Entry list ==
=== Class structure ===
Entries were divided into classes based on car type and driver ratings.

- Class A – GT3 (current-specification GT3 cars)
  - Pro - for driving combinations with no driver category restrictions.
  - Pro-Am - for driving combinations featuring two FIA Platinum-, FIA Gold- or FIA Silver-rated drivers and one or two FIA Bronze-rated drivers.
  - Silver Cup - for driving combinations featuring only FIA Silver- and FIA Bronze-rated drivers
  - Bronze - for driving combinations featuring only FIA Bronze-rated drivers.
- Class B – GT Cup class
  - Class B will be open to Porsche GT3 Cup cars and other GTC cars from one-make categories.
- Class C – GT4 (current-specification GT4 cars)
- Class I – Invitational class
  - Class I will be open to MARC Cars, GT2 cars and other special GT cars.

=== Entries ===
Team	Car	Engine	No.	Drivers	Class
Class A (GT3)
(Australia) Melbourne Performance Centre (Note: Car #2 ran under the commercial title "KFC Racing – Audi Sport Team MPC", Car #9 ran under the commercial title "Hallmarc Team MPC", and Car #22 ran under the commercial title "Wash It – Audi Sport Team MPC".)	Audi R8 LMS Evo II	Audi DAR 5.2 L V10	2	(Switzerland) Ricardo Feller	P
(Australia) Melbourne Performance Centre	Audi R8 LMS Evo II	Audi DAR 5.2 L V10	2	(Australia) Brad Schumacher	P
(Australia) Melbourne Performance Centre	Audi R8 LMS Evo II	Audi DAR 5.2 L V10	2	(Germany) Markus Winkelhock	P
(Australia) Melbourne Performance Centre	Audi R8 LMS Evo II	Audi DAR 5.2 L V10	9	(Australia) Marc Cini	PA
(Australia) Melbourne Performance Centre	Audi R8 LMS Evo II	Audi DAR 5.2 L V10	9	(Australia) Dean Fiore	PA
(Australia) Melbourne Performance Centre	Audi R8 LMS Evo II	Audi DAR 5.2 L V10	9	(Australia) Lee Holdsworth	PA
(Australia) Melbourne Performance Centre	Audi R8 LMS Evo II	Audi DAR 5.2 L V10	22	(Germany) Christopher Haase	P
(Australia) Melbourne Performance Centre	Audi R8 LMS Evo II	Audi DAR 5.2 L V10	22	(South Africa) Kelvin van der Linde	P
(Australia) Melbourne Performance Centre	Audi R8 LMS Evo II	Audi DAR 5.2 L V10	22	(Australia) Liam Talbot	P
(China) Phantom Global Racing / (Germany) Team75 (Note: Car #13 ran under the commercial title "Phantom Global Team75 Bernhard".)	Porsche 911 GT3 R (992)	Porsche M97/80 4.2 L Flat-6	13	(Denmark) Bastian Buus	P
(China) Phantom Global Racing / (Germany) Team75	Porsche 911 GT3 R (992)	Porsche M97/80 4.2 L Flat-6	13	(Sweden) Joel Eriksson	P
(China) Phantom Global Racing / (Germany) Team75	Porsche 911 GT3 R (992)	Porsche M97/80 4.2 L Flat-6	13	(New Zealand) Jaxon Evans	P
(United States) Heart of Racing / (Germany) SPS Automotive Performance (Note: Car #27 ran under the commercial title "Heart of Racing by SPS".)	Mercedes-AMG GT3 Evo	Mercedes-AMG M159 6.2 L V8	27	(United Kingdom) Ian James	PA
(United States) Heart of Racing / (Germany) SPS Automotive Performance	Mercedes-AMG GT3 Evo	Mercedes-AMG M159 6.2 L V8	27	(United Kingdom) Ross Gunn	PA
(United States) Heart of Racing / (Germany) SPS Automotive Performance	Mercedes-AMG GT3 Evo	Mercedes-AMG M159 6.2 L V8	27	(Spain) Alex Riberas	PA
(Belgium) Team WRT (Note: Cars #32 and #46 ran under the commercial title "BMW M Team WRT".)	BMW M4 GT3	BMW S58B30T0 3.0 L Turbo I6	32	(South Africa) Sheldon van der Linde	P
(Belgium) Team WRT	BMW M4 GT3	BMW S58B30T0 3.0 L Turbo I6	32	(Belgium) Dries Vanthoor	P
(Belgium) Team WRT	BMW M4 GT3	BMW S58B30T0 3.0 L Turbo I6	32	(Belgium) Charles Weerts	P
(Belgium) Team WRT	BMW M4 GT3	BMW S58B30T0 3.0 L Turbo I6	46	(Switzerland) Raffaele Marciello	P
(Belgium) Team WRT	BMW M4 GT3	BMW S58B30T0 3.0 L Turbo I6	46	(Belgium) Maxime Martin	P
(Belgium) Team WRT	BMW M4 GT3	BMW S58B30T0 3.0 L Turbo I6	46	(Italy) Valentino Rossi	P
(Australia) Valmont Racing / (Australia) Tigani Motorsport (Note: Car #44 ran under the commercial title "Valmont Tigani Motorsport".)	Audi R8 LMS Evo II	Audi DAR 5.2 L V10	44	(Australia) Sergio Pires	S
(Australia) Valmont Racing / (Australia) Tigani Motorsport	Audi R8 LMS Evo II	Audi DAR 5.2 L V10	44	(Australia) Brad Shiels	S
(Australia) Valmont Racing / (Australia) Tigani Motorsport	Audi R8 LMS Evo II	Audi DAR 5.2 L V10	44	(Australia) Luke Youlden	S
(Australia) Valmont Racing / (Australia) Tigani Motorsport	Audi R8 LMS Evo II	Audi DAR 5.2 L V10	44	(Australia) Marcel Zalloua	S
(Australia) Tigani Motorsport (Note: Car #47 ran under the commercial title "Supabarn Tigani Motorsport".)	Mercedes-AMG GT3 Evo	Mercedes-AMG M159 6.2 L V8	47	(Australia) James Koundouris	S
(Australia) Tigani Motorsport	Mercedes-AMG GT3 Evo	Mercedes-AMG M159 6.2 L V8	47	(Australia) Theo Koundouris	S
(Australia) Tigani Motorsport	Mercedes-AMG GT3 Evo	Mercedes-AMG M159 6.2 L V8	47	(Australia) David Russell	S
(Australia) Tigani Motorsport	Mercedes-AMG GT3 Evo	Mercedes-AMG M159 6.2 L V8	47	(Australia) Jonathon Webb	S
(Australia) M Motorsport / (Australia) Erebus Motorsport (Note: Car #48 ran under the commercial title "M-Motorsport with Erebus".)	Mercedes-AMG GT3 Evo	Mercedes-AMG M159 6.2 L V8	48	(Australia) Jack Le Brocq	PA
(Australia) M Motorsport / (Australia) Erebus Motorsport	Mercedes-AMG GT3 Evo	Mercedes-AMG M159 6.2 L V8	48	(Australia) Justin McMillan	PA
(Australia) M Motorsport / (Australia) Erebus Motorsport	Mercedes-AMG GT3 Evo	Mercedes-AMG M159 6.2 L V8	48	(Australia) Garth Walden	PA
(Australia) M Motorsport / (Australia) Erebus Motorsport	Mercedes-AMG GT3 Evo	Mercedes-AMG M159 6.2 L V8	48	(Australia) Glen Wood	PA
(United States) SunEnergy1 Racing	Mercedes-AMG GT3 Evo	Mercedes-AMG M159 6.2 L V8	75	(Andorra) Jules Gounon	P
(United States) SunEnergy1 Racing	Mercedes-AMG GT3 Evo	Mercedes-AMG M159 6.2 L V8	75	(Australia) Kenny Habul	P
(United States) SunEnergy1 Racing	Mercedes-AMG GT3 Evo	Mercedes-AMG M159 6.2 L V8	75	(Germany) Luca Stolz	P
(Hong Kong) Craft-Bamboo Racing (Note: Car #77 ran under commercial title "Mercedes-AMG Team Craft-Bamboo Racing".)	Mercedes-AMG GT3 Evo	Mercedes-AMG M159 6.2 L V8	77	(Germany) Maximilian Götz	P
(Hong Kong) Craft-Bamboo Racing	Mercedes-AMG GT3 Evo	Mercedes-AMG M159 6.2 L V8	77	(Spain) Daniel Juncadella	P
(Hong Kong) Craft-Bamboo Racing	Mercedes-AMG GT3 Evo	Mercedes-AMG M159 6.2 L V8	77	(Australia) Jayden Ojeda	P
(Australia) Triple Eight Race Engineering (Note: Car #88 ran under the commercial title "Triple Eight JMR", and Car #888 ran under the commercial title "National Storage Racing with Triple Eight".)	Mercedes-AMG GT3 Evo	Mercedes-AMG M159 6.2 L V8	88	(Malaysia) Prince Jeffri Ibrahim	PA
(Australia) Triple Eight Race Engineering	Mercedes-AMG GT3 Evo	Mercedes-AMG M159 6.2 L V8	88	(Australia) Jordan Love	PA
(Australia) Triple Eight Race Engineering	Mercedes-AMG GT3 Evo	Mercedes-AMG M159 6.2 L V8	88	(Australia) Jamie Whincup	PA
(Australia) Triple Eight Race Engineering	Mercedes-AMG GT3 Evo	Mercedes-AMG M159 6.2 L V8	888	(Australia) Will Brown	P
(Australia) Triple Eight Race Engineering	Mercedes-AMG GT3 Evo	Mercedes-AMG M159 6.2 L V8	888	(Australia) Broc Feeney	P
(Australia) Triple Eight Race Engineering	Mercedes-AMG GT3 Evo	Mercedes-AMG M159 6.2 L V8	888	(Canada) Mikaël Grenier	P
(Australia) Wall Racing	Lamborghini Huracán GT3 Evo 2	Lamborghini DGF 5.2 L V10	93	(Australia) Tony D'Alberto	S
(Australia) Wall Racing	Lamborghini Huracán GT3 Evo 2	Lamborghini DGF 5.2 L V10	93	(Australia) Adrian Deitz	S
(Australia) Wall Racing	Lamborghini Huracán GT3 Evo 2	Lamborghini DGF 5.2 L V10	93	(Australia) Grant Denyer	S
(Australia) Wall Racing	Lamborghini Huracán GT3 Evo 2	Lamborghini DGF 5.2 L V10	93	(Australia) David Wall	S
(Hong Kong) GruppeM Racing (Note: Car #130 ran under the commercial title "Mercedes-AMG Team GruppeM Racing".)	Mercedes-AMG GT3 Evo	Mercedes-AMG M159 6.2 L V8	130	(Germany) Maro Engel	P
(Hong Kong) GruppeM Racing	Mercedes-AMG GT3 Evo	Mercedes-AMG M159 6.2 L V8	130	(Brazil) Felipe Fraga	P
(Hong Kong) GruppeM Racing	Mercedes-AMG GT3 Evo	Mercedes-AMG M159 6.2 L V8	130	(Australia) David Reynolds	P
(Australia) Scott Taylor Motorsport	Mercedes-AMG GT3 Evo	Mercedes-AMG M159 6.2 L V8	222	(Australia) Craig Lowndes	P
(Australia) Scott Taylor Motorsport	Mercedes-AMG GT3 Evo	Mercedes-AMG M159 6.2 L V8	222	(Australia) Thomas Randle	P
(Australia) Scott Taylor Motorsport	Mercedes-AMG GT3 Evo	Mercedes-AMG M159 6.2 L V8	222	(Australia) Cam Waters	P
(Germany) Manthey Racing / (Australia) EMA Motorsport (Note: Car #911 ran under the commercial title "Shell V-Power – The Bend Manthey EMA", and Car #912 ran under the commercial title "Manthey EMA Motorsport".)	Porsche 911 GT3 R (991.2)	Porsche 4.0 L Flat-6	911	(United Kingdom) Harry King	PA
(Germany) Manthey Racing / (Australia) EMA Motorsport	Porsche 911 GT3 R (991.2)	Porsche 4.0 L Flat-6	911	(Belgium) Alessio Picariello	PA
(Germany) Manthey Racing / (Australia) EMA Motorsport	Porsche 911 GT3 R (991.2)	Porsche 4.0 L Flat-6	911	(Australia) Yasser Shahin	PA
(Germany) Manthey Racing / (Australia) EMA Motorsport	Porsche 911 GT3 R (992)	Porsche M97/80 4.2 L Flat-6	912	(Australia) Matt Campbell	P
(Germany) Manthey Racing / (Australia) EMA Motorsport	Porsche 911 GT3 R (992)	Porsche M97/80 4.2 L Flat-6	912	(Turkey) Ayhancan Güven	P
(Germany) Manthey Racing / (Australia) EMA Motorsport	Porsche 911 GT3 R (992)	Porsche M97/80 4.2 L Flat-6	912	(Belgium) Laurens Vanthoor	P
Class C (GT4)
(Australia) Nineteen Corporation	Mercedes-AMG GT4	Mercedes-AMG M178 4.0 L Turbo V8	19	(Hong Kong) Daniel Bilski	
(Australia) Nineteen Corporation	Mercedes-AMG GT4	Mercedes-AMG M178 4.0 L Turbo V8	19	(United Kingdom) Adam Christodoulou	
(Australia) Nineteen Corporation	Mercedes-AMG GT4	Mercedes-AMG M178 4.0 L Turbo V8	19	(Australia) Mark Griffith	
(Australia) Nineteen Corporation	Ginetta G56 GT4	GM LS3 6.2 L V8	56	(Australia) Paul Buccini	
(Australia) Nineteen Corporation	Ginetta G56 GT4	GM LS3 6.2 L V8	56	(United Kingdom) Owen Hizzey	
(Australia) Nineteen Corporation	Ginetta G56 GT4	GM LS3 6.2 L V8	56	(United Kingdom) Colin White	
(Australia) Nineteen Corporation	Ginetta G56 GT4	GM LS3 6.2 L V8	56	(Australia) Aaron Zerefos	
(Australia) Method Motorsport	McLaren Artura GT4	McLaren M630 3.0 L Turbo V6	25	(Australia) Jesse Bryan	
(Australia) Method Motorsport	McLaren Artura GT4	McLaren M630 3.0 L Turbo V6	25	(Australia) Marcos Flack	
(Australia) Method Motorsport	McLaren Artura GT4	McLaren M630 3.0 L Turbo V6	25	(Australia) Chaz Mostert	
(Australia) Method Motorsport	McLaren Artura GT4	McLaren M630 3.0 L Turbo V6	230	(Australia) Tom Hayman	
(Australia) Method Motorsport	McLaren Artura GT4	McLaren M630 3.0 L Turbo V6	230	(Australia) Tom McLennan	
(Australia) Method Motorsport	McLaren Artura GT4	McLaren M630 3.0 L Turbo V6	230	(Australia) Elliot Schutte	
Class I (Invitational)
(Australia) Matt Stone Racing	MARC IRC GT	GM LS3 6.2 L V8	10	(Australia) Cameron Hill	
(Australia) Matt Stone Racing	MARC IRC GT	GM LS3 6.2 L V8	10	(Australia) John Holinger	
(Australia) Matt Stone Racing	MARC IRC GT	GM LS3 6.2 L V8	10	(Australia) Nick Percat	
(Australia) T2 Racing (Note: Car #20 ran under the commercial title "Localsearch T2 Racing".)	MARC IRC GT	GM LS3 6.2 L V8	20	(Australia) Adam Hargraves	
(Australia) T2 Racing	MARC IRC GT	GM LS3 6.2 L V8	20	(New Zealand) Daniel Jilesen	
(Australia) T2 Racing	MARC IRC GT	GM LS3 6.2 L V8	20	(Monaco) Cédric Sbirrazzuoli	
(Australia) Vantage Racing	KTM X-Bow GT2	Audi TFSI 2.5 L Turbo I5	50	(Australia) David Crampton	
(Australia) Vantage Racing	KTM X-Bow GT2	Audi TFSI 2.5 L Turbo I5	50	(Australia) Trent Harrison	
(Australia) Vantage Racing	KTM X-Bow GT2	Audi TFSI 2.5 L Turbo I5	50	(Austria) Laura Kraihamer	
(Papua New Guinea) Wheels Ltd. (Note: Car #91 ran under the commercial title "Wheels / FX Racing".)	MARC II V8	Ford Modular 5.2 L V8	91	(Papua New Guinea) Keith Kassulke	
(Papua New Guinea) Wheels Ltd.	MARC II V8	Ford Modular 5.2 L V8	91	(Australia) Cameron McLeod	
(Papua New Guinea) Wheels Ltd.	MARC II V8	Ford Modular 5.2 L V8	91	(Australia) Hadrian Morrall	
(Papua New Guinea) Wheels Ltd.	MARC II V8	Ford Modular 5.2 L V8	91	(Australia) Tim Slade	
(Australia) MRA Motorsport	MARC II V8	Ford Modular 5.2 L V8	111	(Australia) Darren Currie	
(Australia) MRA Motorsport	MARC II V8	Ford Modular 5.2 L V8	111	(Australia) Axle Donaldson	
(Australia) MRA Motorsport	MARC II V8	Ford Modular 5.2 L V8	111	(Australia) Rylan Gray	
(France) Vortex SAS	Vortex 1.0	Chevrolet LS3 6.2 L V8	701	(France) Lionel Amrouche	
(France) Vortex SAS	Vortex 1.0	Chevrolet LS3 6.2 L V8	701	(France) Julien Boilot	
(France) Vortex SAS	Vortex 1.0	Chevrolet LS3 6.2 L V8	701	(France) Philippe Bonnel	
(Australia) TekworkX Motorsport	MARC IRC GT	GM LS3 6.2 L V8	702	(Australia) Geoff Emery	
(Australia) TekworkX Motorsport	MARC IRC GT	GM LS3 6.2 L V8	702	(Australia) Daniel Stutterd	
(Australia) TekworkX Motorsport	MARC IRC GT	GM LS3 6.2 L V8	702	(Canada) Paul Tracy	
(Australia) TekworkX Motorsport	MARC IRC GT	GM LS3 6.2 L V8	702	(Australia) Max Twigg	

Icon	Class
P	Pro
S	Silver
PA	Pro-Am
Am	Am

==== Notes ====
- HubAuto Racing was due to compete in the GT3-Pro class with a Porsche 911 GT3 R (992) with drivers Klaus Bachler, Kévin Estre and Patrick Pilet, but withdrew due to shipping delays making the car unable to arrive on time.

== Results ==
=== Practice ===
Session	Day	Fastest Lap					
Session	Day	No.	Driver	Team	Car	Time	Ref
Practice 1	Friday	22	(South Africa) Kelvin van der Linde	(Australia) Melbourne Performance Centre	Audi R8 LMS Evo II	2:02.7346	
Practice 2 (Note: Session was for FIA Bronze categorised drivers only.)	Friday	22	(Australia) Liam Talbot	(Australia) Melbourne Performance Centre	Audi R8 LMS Evo II	2:06.1193	
Practice 3	Friday	912	(Belgium) Laurens Vanthoor	(Germany) Manthey Racing / (Australia) EMA Motorsport	Porsche 911 GT3 R (992)	2:03.6897	
Practice 4	Friday	48	(Australia) Garth Walden	(Australia) M Motorsport / (Australia) Erebus Motorsport	Mercedes-AMG GT3 Evo	2:05.3317	
Practice 5	Saturday	88	(Australia) Jamie Whincup	(Australia) Triple Eight Race Engineering	Mercedes-AMG GT3 Evo	2:03.1132	
Practice 6	Saturday	222	(Australia) Cam Waters	(Australia) Scott Taylor Motorsport	Mercedes-AMG GT3 Evo	2:02.9190	

=== Qualifying ===
Pos.	Class	No.	Driver	Team	Car	Time	
Pos.	Class	No.	Driver	Team	Car	Gr.A	Gr.B
1	P	888	(Australia) Broc Feeney	(Australia) Triple Eight Race Engineering	Mercedes-AMG GT3 Evo		2:01.8911
2	P	75	(Germany) Luca Stolz	(United States) SunEnergy1 Racing	Mercedes-AMG GT3 Evo		+0.3188
3	P	32	(South Africa) Sheldon van der Linde	(Belgium) Team WRT	BMW M4 GT3		+0.3231
4	P	130	(Germany) Maro Engel	(Hong Kong) GruppeM Racing	Mercedes-AMG GT3 Evo		+0.3282
5	PA	88	(Australia) Jordan Love	(Australia) Triple Eight Race Engineering	Mercedes-AMG GT3 Evo		+0.4287
6	P	912	(Australia) Matt Campbell	(Germany) Manthey Racing / (Australia) EMA Motorsport	Porsche 911 GT3 R (992)		+0.4874
7	P	2	(Switzerland) Ricardo Feller	(Australia) Melbourne Performance Centre	Audi R8 LMS Evo II		+0.5636
8	P	22	(South Africa) Kelvin van der Linde	(Australia) Melbourne Performance Centre	Audi R8 LMS Evo II		+0.5664
9	P	46	(Belgium) Maxime Martin	(Belgium) Team WRT	BMW M4 GT3		+0.6943
10	PA	911	(Belgium) Alessio Picariello	(Germany) Manthey Racing / (Australia) EMA Motorsport	Porsche 911 GT3 R (991.2)		+0.9940
11	P	77	(Germany) Maximilian Götz	(Hong Kong) Craft-Bamboo Racing	Mercedes-AMG GT3 Evo		+1.0310
12	PA	9	(Australia) Lee Holdsworth	(Australia) Melbourne Performance Centre	Audi R8 LMS Evo II		+1.0613
13	P	222	(Australia) Cam Waters	(Australia) Scott Taylor Motorsport	Mercedes-AMG GT3 Evo		+1.1325
14	PA	48	(Australia) Glen Wood	(Australia) M Motorsport / (Australia) Erebus Motorsport	Mercedes-AMG GT3 Evo	+1.5335	
15	S	44	(Australia) Luke Youlden	(Australia) Tigani Motorsport / (Australia) Valmont Racing	Audi R8 LMS Evo II		+1.5950
16	S	93	(Australia) Tony D'Alberto	(Australia) Wall Racing	Lamborghini Huracán GT3 Evo 2	+2.1495	
17	S	47	(Australia) David Russell	(Australia) Tigani Motorsport	Mercedes-AMG GT3 Evo	+2.1780	
18	P	13	(Sweden) Joel Eriksson	(China) Phantom Global Racing / (Germany) Team75	Porsche 911 GT3 R (992)	+2.3041	
19	PA	27	(United Kingdom) Ross Gunn	(United States) Heart of Racing / (Germany) SPS Automotive Performance	Mercedes-AMG GT3 Evo		+2.3101
20	I	91	(Australia) Tim Slade	(Papua New Guinea) Wheels Ltd.	MARC II V8	+4.1878	
21	I	111	(Australia) Rylan Gray	(Australia) MRA Motorsport	MARC II V8	+4.2272	
22	I	10	(Australia) Nick Percat	(Australia) Matt Stone Racing	MARC IRC GT	+4.7996	
23	I	702	(Canada) Paul Tracy	(Australia) TekworkX Motorsport	MARC IRC GT	+10.9324	
24	GT4	19	(United Kingdom) Adam Christodoulou	(Australia) Nineteen Corporation	Mercedes-AMG GT4	+12.9671	
25	GT4	25	(Australia) Marcos Flack	(Australia) Method Motorsport	McLaren Artura GT4	+13.7760	
26	I	701	(France) Philippe Bonnel	(France) Vortex SAS	Vortex 1.0	+15.0913	
27	GT4	230	(Australia) Thomas Hayman	(Australia) Method Motorsport	McLaren Artura GT4	+15.1937	
28	GT4	56	(United Kingdom) Owen Hizzey	(Australia) Nineteen Corporation	Ginetta G56 GT4	+16.1609	
29	I	20	(Monaco) Cédric Sbirrazzuoli	(Australia) T2 Racing	MARC IRC GT	No time	
WD	I	50	(Austria) Laura Kraihamer	(Australia) Vantage Racing	KTM X-Bow GT2	Withdrawn	

=== Top 10 Shootout ===
Pos.	Class	No.	Driver	Team	Car	Time	
Pos.	Class	No.	Driver	Team	Car	Gr.A	Gr.B
1	P	32	(South Africa) Sheldon van der Linde	(Belgium) Team WRT	BMW M4 GT3		2:01.9810
2	P	888	(Australia) Broc Feeney	(Australia) Triple Eight Race Engineering	Mercedes-AMG GT3 Evo		+0.2562
3	P	130	(Germany) Maro Engel	(Hong Kong) GruppeM Racing	Mercedes-AMG GT3 Evo		+0.4290
4	P	912	(Australia) Matt Campbell	(Germany) Manthey Racing / (Australia) EMA Motorsport	Porsche 911 GT3 R (992)	+0.4449	
5	P	75	(Germany) Luca Stolz	(United States) SunEnergy1 Racing	Mercedes-AMG GT3 Evo		+0.4581
6	P	2	(Switzerland) Ricardo Feller	(Australia) Melbourne Performance Centre	Audi R8 LMS Evo II	+0.6794	
7	P	22	(South Africa) Kelvin van der Linde	(Australia) Melbourne Performance Centre	Audi R8 LMS Evo II	+0.7792	
8	P	46	(Belgium) Maxime Martin	(Belgium) Team WRT	BMW M4 GT3	+0.8420	
9	PA	911	(Belgium) Alessio Picariello	(Germany) Manthey Racing / (Australia) EMA Motorsport	Porsche 911 GT3 R (991.2)	+1.0985	
10	PA	88	(Australia) Jordan Love	(Australia) Triple Eight Race Engineering	Mercedes-AMG GT3 Evo		+1.1101

=== Race ===
Class winners indicated in bold and with ‡.

Pos.	Class	No.	Team	Drivers	Car	Laps	Time/Retired
Pos.	Class	No.	Team	Drivers	Engine	Laps	Time/Retired
1	P	**912**	**(Germany) Manthey Racing /** **(Australia) EMA Motorsport**	**(Australia) Matt Campbell** **(Turkey) Ayhancan Güven** **(Belgium) Laurens Vanthoor**	**Porsche 911 GT3 R (992)**	**275**	**12:01:22.0968**
1	P	**912**	**(Germany) Manthey Racing /** **(Australia) EMA Motorsport**	**(Australia) Matt Campbell** **(Turkey) Ayhancan Güven** **(Belgium) Laurens Vanthoor**	**Porsche M97/80 4.2 L Flat-6**	**275**	**12:01:22.0968**
2	P	75	(United States) SunEnergy1 Racing	(France) Jules Gounon (Australia) Kenny Habul (Germany) Luca Stolz	Mercedes-AMG GT3 Evo	275	+2.6336
2	P	75	(United States) SunEnergy1 Racing	(France) Jules Gounon (Australia) Kenny Habul (Germany) Luca Stolz	Mercedes-AMG M159 6.2 L V8	275	+2.6336
3	P	22	(Australia) Melbourne Performance Centre	(Germany) Christopher Haase (Australia) Liam Talbot (South Africa) Kelvin van der Linde	Audi R8 LMS Evo II	275	+3.7791
3	P	22	(Australia) Melbourne Performance Centre	(Germany) Christopher Haase (Australia) Liam Talbot (South Africa) Kelvin van der Linde	Audi DAR 5.2 L V10	275	+3.7791
4	P	13	(China) Phantom Global Racing / (Germany) Team75	(Denmark) Bastian Buus (Sweden) Joel Eriksson (New Zealand) Jaxon Evans	Porsche 911 GT3 R (992)	275	+5.4038
4	P	13	(China) Phantom Global Racing / (Germany) Team75	(Denmark) Bastian Buus (Sweden) Joel Eriksson (New Zealand) Jaxon Evans	Porsche M97/80 4.2 L Flat-6	275	+5.4038
5	P	46	(Belgium) Team WRT	(Switzerland) Raffaele Marciello (Belgium) Maxime Martin (Italy) Valentino Rossi	BMW M4 GT3	275	+5.8695
5	P	46	(Belgium) Team WRT	(Switzerland) Raffaele Marciello (Belgium) Maxime Martin (Italy) Valentino Rossi	BMW S58B30T0 3.0 L Twin Turbo I6	275	+5.8695
6	P	888	(Australia) Triple Eight Race Engineering	(Australia) Will Brown (Australia) Broc Feeney (Canada) Mikaël Grenier	Mercedes-AMG GT3 Evo	275	+7.3295
6	P	888	(Australia) Triple Eight Race Engineering	(Australia) Will Brown (Australia) Broc Feeney (Canada) Mikaël Grenier	Mercedes-AMG M159 6.2 L V8	275	+7.3295
7	P	222	(Australia) Scott Taylor Motorsport	(Australia) Craig Lowndes (Australia) Thomas Randle (Australia) Cam Waters	Mercedes-AMG GT3 Evo	275	+16.1615
7	P	222	(Australia) Scott Taylor Motorsport	(Australia) Craig Lowndes (Australia) Thomas Randle (Australia) Cam Waters	Mercedes-AMG M159 6.2 L V8	275	+16.1615
8	P	130	(Hong Kong) GruppeM Racing	(Germany) Maro Engel (Brazil) Felipe Fraga (Australia) David Reynolds	Mercedes-AMG GT3 Evo	275	+30.6198
8	P	130	(Hong Kong) GruppeM Racing	(Germany) Maro Engel (Brazil) Felipe Fraga (Australia) David Reynolds	Mercedes-AMG M159 6.2 L V8	275	+30.6198
9	PA	**911**	**(Germany) Manthey Racing /** **(Australia) EMA Motorsport**	**(United Kingdom) Harry King** **(Belgium) Alessio Picariello** **(Australia) Yasser Shahin**	**Porsche 911 GT3 R (991.2)**	**274**	**+1 lap**
9	PA	**911**	**(Germany) Manthey Racing /** **(Australia) EMA Motorsport**	**(United Kingdom) Harry King** **(Belgium) Alessio Picariello** **(Australia) Yasser Shahin**	**Porsche 4.0 L Flat-6**	**274**	**+1 lap**
10	PA	27	(United States) Heart of Racing / (Germany) SPS Automotive Performance	(United Kingdom) Ian James (United Kingdom) Ross Gunn (Spain) Alex Riberas	Mercedes-AMG GT3 Evo	274	+1 lap
10	PA	27	(United States) Heart of Racing / (Germany) SPS Automotive Performance	(United Kingdom) Ian James (United Kingdom) Ross Gunn (Spain) Alex Riberas	Mercedes-AMG M159 6.2 L V8	274	+1 lap
11	PA	88	(Australia) Triple Eight Race Engineering	(Malaysia) Prince Jeffri Ibrahim (Australia) Jordan Love (Australia) Jamie Whincup	Mercedes-AMG GT3 Evo	274	+1 lap
11	PA	88	(Australia) Triple Eight Race Engineering	(Malaysia) Prince Jeffri Ibrahim (Australia) Jordan Love (Australia) Jamie Whincup	Mercedes-AMG M159 6.2 L V8	274	+1 lap
12	S	**93**	**(Australia) Wall Racing**	**(Australia) Tony D'Alberto** **(Australia) Adrian Deitz** **(Australia) Grant Denyer** **(Australia) David Wall**	**Lamborghini Huracán GT3 Evo 2**	**273**	**+2 laps**
12	S	**93**	**(Australia) Wall Racing**	**(Australia) Tony D'Alberto** **(Australia) Adrian Deitz** **(Australia) Grant Denyer** **(Australia) David Wall**	**Lamborghini DGF 5.2 L V10**	**273**	**+2 laps**
13	PA	9	(Australia) Melbourne Performance Centre	(Australia) Marc Cini (Australia) Dean Fiore (Australia) Lee Holdsworth	Audi R8 LMS Evo II	270	+5 laps
13	PA	9	(Australia) Melbourne Performance Centre	(Australia) Marc Cini (Australia) Dean Fiore (Australia) Lee Holdsworth	Audi DAR 5.2 L V10	270	+5 laps
14	S	44	(Australia) Valmont Racing / (Australia) Tigani Motorsport	(Australia) Sergio Pires (Australia) Brad Shiels (Australia) Luke Youlden (Australia) Marcel Zalloua	Audi R8 LMS Evo II	270	+5 laps
14	S	44	(Australia) Valmont Racing / (Australia) Tigani Motorsport	(Australia) Sergio Pires (Australia) Brad Shiels (Australia) Luke Youlden (Australia) Marcel Zalloua	Audi DAR 5.2 L V10	270	+5 laps
15	S	47	(Australia) Tigani Motorsport	(Australia) James Koundouris (Australia) Theo Koundouris (Australia) David Russell (Australia) Jonathon Webb	Mercedes-AMG GT3 Evo	268	+7 laps
15	S	47	(Australia) Tigani Motorsport	(Australia) James Koundouris (Australia) Theo Koundouris (Australia) David Russell (Australia) Jonathon Webb	Mercedes-AMG M159 6.2 L V8	268	+7 laps
16	PA	48	(Australia) M Motorsport / (Australia) Erebus Motorsport	(Australia) Jack Le Brocq (Australia) Justin McMillan (Australia) Garth Walden (Australia) Glen Wood	Mercedes-AMG GT3 Evo	259	+16 laps
16	PA	48	(Australia) M Motorsport / (Australia) Erebus Motorsport	(Australia) Jack Le Brocq (Australia) Justin McMillan (Australia) Garth Walden (Australia) Glen Wood	Mercedes-AMG M159 6.2 L V8	259	+16 laps
17	GT4	**19**	**(Australia) Nineteen Corporation**	**(Hong Kong) Daniel Bilski** **(United Kingdom) Adam Christodoulou** **(Australia) Mark Griffith**	**Mercedes-AMG GT4**	**253**	**+22 laps**
17	GT4	**19**	**(Australia) Nineteen Corporation**	**(Hong Kong) Daniel Bilski** **(United Kingdom) Adam Christodoulou** **(Australia) Mark Griffith**	**Mercedes-AMG M178 4.0 L Turbo V8**	**253**	**+22 laps**
18	GT4	230	(Australia) Method Motorsport	(Australia) Tom Hayman (Australia) Tom McLennan (Australia) Elliot Schutte	McLaren Artura GT4	252	+23 laps
18	GT4	230	(Australia) Method Motorsport	(Australia) Tom Hayman (Australia) Tom McLennan (Australia) Elliot Schutte	McLaren M630 3.0 L Turbo V6	252	+23 laps
19	I	**20**	**(Australia) T2 Racing**	**(Australia) Adam Hargraves** **(New Zealand) Daniel Jilesen** **(Monaco) Cédric Sbirrazzuoli**	**MARC IRC GT**	**245**	**+30 laps**
19	I	**20**	**(Australia) T2 Racing**	**(Australia) Adam Hargraves** **(New Zealand) Daniel Jilesen** **(Monaco) Cédric Sbirrazzuoli**	**GM LS3 6.2 L V8]**	**245**	**+30 laps**
20	I	702	(Australia) TekworkX Motorsport	(Australia) Geoff Emery (Australia) Daniel Stutterd (Canada) Paul Tracy (Australia) Max Twigg	MARC IRC GT	233	+42 laps
20	I	702	(Australia) TekworkX Motorsport	(Australia) Geoff Emery (Australia) Daniel Stutterd (Canada) Paul Tracy (Australia) Max Twigg	GM LS3 6.2 L V8	233	+42 laps
21	I	10	(Australia) Matt Stone Racing	(Australia) Cameron Hill (Australia) John Holinger (Australia) Nick Percat	MARC IRC GT	222	+53 laps
21	I	10	(Australia) Matt Stone Racing	(Australia) Cameron Hill (Australia) John Holinger (Australia) Nick Percat	GM LS3 6.2 L V8	222	+53 laps
22	GT4	25	(Australia) Method Motorsport	(Australia) Jesse Bryan (Australia) Marcos Flack (Australia) Chaz Mostert	McLaren Artura GT4	217	+58 laps
22	GT4	25	(Australia) Method Motorsport	(Australia) Jesse Bryan (Australia) Marcos Flack (Australia) Chaz Mostert	McLaren M630 3.0 L Turbo V6	217	+58 laps
23	I	701	(France) Vortex SAS	(France) Lionel Amrouche (France) Julien Boilot (France) Philippe Bonnel	Vortex 1.0	212	+63 laps
23	I	701	(France) Vortex SAS	(France) Lionel Amrouche (France) Julien Boilot (France) Philippe Bonnel	Chevrolet LS3 6.2 L V8	212	+63 laps
DNF	P	77	(Hong Kong) Craft-Bamboo Racing	(Germany) Maximilian Götz (Spain) Daniel Juncadella (Australia) Jayden Ojeda	Mercedes-AMG GT3 Evo	223	Suspension
DNF	P	77	(Hong Kong) Craft-Bamboo Racing	(Germany) Maximilian Götz (Spain) Daniel Juncadella (Australia) Jayden Ojeda	Mercedes-AMG M159 6.2 L V8	223	Suspension
DNF	P	2	(Australia) Melbourne Performance Centre	(Switzerland) Ricardo Feller (Australia) Brad Schumacher (Germany) Markus Winkelhock	Audi R8 LMS Evo II	216	Toe-link
DNF	P	2	(Australia) Melbourne Performance Centre	(Switzerland) Ricardo Feller (Australia) Brad Schumacher (Germany) Markus Winkelhock	Audi DAR 5.2 L V10	216	Toe-link
DNF	I	111	(Australia) MRA Motorsport	(Australia) Darren Currie (Australia) Axle Donaldson (Australia) Rylan Gray	MARC II V8	198	Engine
DNF	I	111	(Australia) MRA Motorsport	(Australia) Darren Currie (Australia) Axle Donaldson (Australia) Rylan Gray	Ford Modular 5.2 L V8	198	Engine
DNF	P	32	(Belgium) Team WRT	(South Africa) Sheldon van der Linde (Belgium) Dries Vanthoor (Belgium) Charles Weerts	BMW M4 GT3	120	Crash
DNF	P	32	(Belgium) Team WRT	(South Africa) Sheldon van der Linde (Belgium) Dries Vanthoor (Belgium) Charles Weerts	BMW S58B30T0 3.0 L Turbo I6	120	Crash
DNF	I	91	(Papua New Guinea) Wheels Ltd.	(Papua New Guinea) Keith Kassulke (Australia) Cameron McLeod (Australia) Hadrian Morrall (Australia) Tim Slade	MARC II V8	85	Crash
DNF	I	91	(Papua New Guinea) Wheels Ltd.	(Papua New Guinea) Keith Kassulke (Australia) Cameron McLeod (Australia) Hadrian Morrall (Australia) Tim Slade	Ford Modular 5.2 L V8	85	Crash
DNF	GT4	56	(Australia) Nineteen Corporation	(Australia) Paul Buccini (United Kingdom) Oliver Hizzey (United Kingdom) Colin White (Australia) Aaron Zerefos	Ginetta G56 GT4	83	Suspension
DNF	GT4	56	(Australia) Nineteen Corporation	(Australia) Paul Buccini (United Kingdom) Oliver Hizzey (United Kingdom) Colin White (Australia) Aaron Zerefos	GM LS3 6.2 L V8	83	Suspension
WD	I	50	(Australia) Vantage Racing	(Australia) David Crampton (Australia) Trent Harrison (Austria) Laura Kraihamer	KTM X-Bow GT2	0	Crash in Practice 6
WD	I	50	(Australia) Vantage Racing	(Australia) David Crampton (Australia) Trent Harrison (Austria) Laura Kraihamer	Audi TFSI 2.5 L Turbo I5	0	Crash in Practice 6
