= 2024 Intercontinental GT Challenge =

Motorsport event

The 2024 Intercontinental GT Challenge was the ninth season of the Intercontinental GT Challenge. It consisted of four rounds starting with the Bathurst 12 Hour on 18 February with the finale at Indianapolis 8 Hour on 6 October.

== Calendar ==
Map of circuit locations

The provisional calendar was released on July 1, 2023, at the SRO's annual 24 Hours of Spa press conference, featuring four rounds.

Also part of the GT World Challenge Australia
Also part of the GT World Challenge Europe
Also part of the GT World Challenge America

Round	Race	Circuit	Date	Report
1	(Australia) Repco Bathurst 12 Hour	Mount Panorama Circuit, Bathurst, Australia	16 – 18 February	Report
2	(Germany) ADAC Ravenol Nürburgring 24 Hours	Nürburgring Nordschleife, Nürburg, Germany	30 May – 2 June	Report
3	(Belgium) CrowdStrike 24 Hours of Spa	Circuit de Spa-Francorchamps, Stavelot, Belgium	27 – 30 June	Report
4	(United States) Indianapolis 8 Hour Presented by AWS	Indianapolis Motor Speedway, Speedway, United States	4 – 6 October	Report

== Entries ==
Manufacturer	Team	Car	No.	Drivers	Class	Rounds
BMW	(United States) Flying Lizard Motorsports	M4 GT3	8	(United States) Andy Lee	PA	4
BMW	(United States) Flying Lizard Motorsports	M4 GT3	8	(United States) Elias Sabo	PA	4
BMW	(United States) Flying Lizard Motorsports	M4 GT3	8	(United Kingdom) Nick Yelloly	PA	4
BMW	(Canada) ST Racing	M4 GT3	28	(United States) Bill Auberlen	P	4
BMW	(Canada) ST Racing	M4 GT3	28	(United States) Varun Choksey	P	4
BMW	(Canada) ST Racing	M4 GT3	28	(Austria) Philipp Eng	P	4
BMW	(Canada) ST Racing	M4 GT3	38	(Canada) Samantha Tan	PA	4
BMW	(Canada) ST Racing	M4 GT3	38	(United States) Neil Verhagen	PA	4
BMW	(Canada) ST Racing	M4 GT3	38	(United States) John Capestro-Dubets	PA	4
BMW	(United States) Turner Motorsport	M4 GT3	29	(United States) Robby Foley	PA	4
BMW	(United States) Turner Motorsport	M4 GT3	29	(United States) Justin Rothberg	PA	4
BMW	(United States) Turner Motorsport	M4 GT3	29	(United States) Patrick Gallagher	PA	4
BMW	OQ by Oman Racing (Note: Car No. 30 entered as OQ by Oman Racing, car 31 and 33 entered as Team WRT, car No. 32 and No. 46 entered as BMW M Team WRT in round 1, and entered as Team WRT in round 3) (Belgium) BMW M Team WRT (Belgium) Team WRT	M4 GT3	30	(Oman) Ahmad Al Harthy	B	3
BMW	OQ by Oman Racing (Belgium) BMW M Team WRT (Belgium) Team WRT	M4 GT3	30	(United Kingdom) Sam De Haan	B	3
BMW	OQ by Oman Racing (Belgium) BMW M Team WRT (Belgium) Team WRT	M4 GT3	30	(Germany) Jens Klingmann	B	3
BMW	OQ by Oman Racing (Belgium) BMW M Team WRT (Belgium) Team WRT	M4 GT3	30	(Australia) Calan Williams	B	3
BMW	OQ by Oman Racing (Belgium) BMW M Team WRT (Belgium) Team WRT	M4 GT3	31	(South Africa) Sheldon van der Linde	P	4
BMW	OQ by Oman Racing (Belgium) BMW M Team WRT (Belgium) Team WRT	M4 GT3	31	(Belgium) Dries Vanthoor	P	4
BMW	OQ by Oman Racing (Belgium) BMW M Team WRT (Belgium) Team WRT	M4 GT3	31	(Belgium) Charles Weerts	P	4
BMW	OQ by Oman Racing (Belgium) BMW M Team WRT (Belgium) Team WRT	M4 GT3	32	(South Africa) Sheldon van der Linde	P	1, 3
BMW	OQ by Oman Racing (Belgium) BMW M Team WRT (Belgium) Team WRT	M4 GT3	32	(Belgium) Dries Vanthoor	P	1, 3
BMW	OQ by Oman Racing (Belgium) BMW M Team WRT (Belgium) Team WRT	M4 GT3	32	(Belgium) Charles Weerts	P	1, 3
BMW	OQ by Oman Racing (Belgium) BMW M Team WRT (Belgium) Team WRT	M4 GT3	33	(United Kingdom) Dan Harper	P	4
BMW	OQ by Oman Racing (Belgium) BMW M Team WRT (Belgium) Team WRT	M4 GT3	33	(Germany) Max Hesse	P	4
BMW	OQ by Oman Racing (Belgium) BMW M Team WRT (Belgium) Team WRT	M4 GT3	33	(Brazil) Augusto Farfus	P	4
BMW	OQ by Oman Racing (Belgium) BMW M Team WRT (Belgium) Team WRT	M4 GT3	46	(Switzerland) Raffaele Marciello	P	1, 3
BMW	OQ by Oman Racing (Belgium) BMW M Team WRT (Belgium) Team WRT	M4 GT3	46	(Belgium) Maxime Martin	P	1, 3
BMW	OQ by Oman Racing (Belgium) BMW M Team WRT (Belgium) Team WRT	M4 GT3	46	(Italy) Valentino Rossi	P	1, 3
BMW	(Germany) BMW M Team RMG	M4 GT3	72	(United Kingdom) Dan Harper	P	2
BMW	(Germany) BMW M Team RMG	M4 GT3	72	(Germany) Max Hesse	P	2
BMW	(Germany) BMW M Team RMG	M4 GT3	72	(Belgium) Charles Weerts	P	2
BMW	(Germany) ROWE Racing	M4 GT3	98	(Germany) Marco Wittmann	P	2–3
BMW	(Germany) ROWE Racing	M4 GT3	98	(Brazil) Augusto Farfus	P	2
BMW	(Germany) ROWE Racing	M4 GT3	98	(Switzerland) Raffaele Marciello	P	2
BMW	(Germany) ROWE Racing	M4 GT3	98	(Belgium) Maxime Martin	P	2
BMW	(Germany) ROWE Racing	M4 GT3	98	(Austria) Philipp Eng	P	3
BMW	(Germany) ROWE Racing	M4 GT3	98	(United Kingdom) Nick Yelloly	P	3
BMW	(Germany) ROWE Racing	M4 GT3	99	(Brazil) Augusto Farfus	P	2
BMW	(Germany) ROWE Racing	M4 GT3	99	(Netherlands) Robin Frijns	P	2
BMW	(Germany) ROWE Racing	M4 GT3	99	(South Africa) Sheldon van der Linde	P	2
BMW	(Germany) ROWE Racing	M4 GT3	99	(Belgium) Dries Vanthoor	P	2
BMW	(Germany) ROWE Racing	M4 GT3	998	(Brazil) Augusto Farfus	P	3
BMW	(Germany) ROWE Racing	M4 GT3	998	(United Kingdom) Dan Harper	P	3
BMW	(Germany) ROWE Racing	M4 GT3	998	(Germany) Max Hesse	P	3
BMW	(United States) Random Vandals Racing	M4 GT3	99	(United States) Kenton Koch	P	4
BMW	(United States) Random Vandals Racing	M4 GT3	99	(United States) Conor Daly	P	4
BMW	(United States) Random Vandals Racing	M4 GT3	99	(United States) Connor De Phillippi	P	4
BMW	(United Kingdom) Century Motorsport	M4 GT3	991	(United Kingdom) Darren Leung	B	3
BMW	(United Kingdom) Century Motorsport	M4 GT3	991	(United Kingdom) Toby Sowery	B	3
BMW	(United Kingdom) Century Motorsport	M4 GT3	991	(United States) Connor De Phillippi	B	3
BMW	(United Kingdom) Century Motorsport	M4 GT3	991	(Brazil) Pedro Ebrahim	B	3
Mercedes-AMG	(Germany) Mercedes-AMG Team GetSpeed (Note: Car No. 2, No. 8 and No. 130 entered as Mercedes-AMG Team GetSpeed, car No. 3 entered as Getspeed, and car No. 777 entered as Almanar Racing by Getspeed.) (Germany) GetSpeed (Oman) AlManar Racing by GetSpeed	AMG GT3 Evo	2	(Andorra) Jules Gounon	P	3
Mercedes-AMG	(Germany) Mercedes-AMG Team GetSpeed (Germany) GetSpeed (Oman) AlManar Racing by GetSpeed	AMG GT3 Evo	2	(Germany) Fabian Schiller		3
Mercedes-AMG	(Germany) Mercedes-AMG Team GetSpeed (Germany) GetSpeed (Oman) AlManar Racing by GetSpeed	AMG GT3 Evo	2	(Germany) Luca Stolz		3
Mercedes-AMG	(Germany) Mercedes-AMG Team GetSpeed (Germany) GetSpeed (Oman) AlManar Racing by GetSpeed	AMG GT3 Evo	3	(United States) Anthony Bartone	S	3
Mercedes-AMG	(Germany) Mercedes-AMG Team GetSpeed (Germany) GetSpeed (Oman) AlManar Racing by GetSpeed	AMG GT3 Evo	3	(United Kingdom) James Kell	S	3
Mercedes-AMG	(Germany) Mercedes-AMG Team GetSpeed (Germany) GetSpeed (Oman) AlManar Racing by GetSpeed	AMG GT3 Evo	3	(Switzerland) Yannick Mettler	S	3
Mercedes-AMG	(Germany) Mercedes-AMG Team GetSpeed (Germany) GetSpeed (Oman) AlManar Racing by GetSpeed	AMG GT3 Evo	3	(United Kingdom) Aaron Walker	S	3
Mercedes-AMG	(Germany) Mercedes-AMG Team GetSpeed (Germany) GetSpeed (Oman) AlManar Racing by GetSpeed	AMG GT3 Evo	8	(Austria) Lucas Auer	P	2
Mercedes-AMG	(Germany) Mercedes-AMG Team GetSpeed (Germany) GetSpeed (Oman) AlManar Racing by GetSpeed	AMG GT3 Evo	8	(United Kingdom) Adam Christodoulou	P	2
Mercedes-AMG	(Germany) Mercedes-AMG Team GetSpeed (Germany) GetSpeed (Oman) AlManar Racing by GetSpeed	AMG GT3 Evo	8	(Switzerland) Philip Ellis	P	2
Mercedes-AMG	(Germany) Mercedes-AMG Team GetSpeed (Germany) GetSpeed (Oman) AlManar Racing by GetSpeed	AMG GT3 Evo	8	(Canada) Mikaël Grenier	P	2
Mercedes-AMG	(Germany) Mercedes-AMG Team GetSpeed (Germany) GetSpeed (Oman) AlManar Racing by GetSpeed	AMG GT3 Evo	130	(Germany) Maro Engel	P	2
Mercedes-AMG	(Germany) Mercedes-AMG Team GetSpeed (Germany) GetSpeed (Oman) AlManar Racing by GetSpeed	AMG GT3 Evo	130	(Andorra) Jules Gounon	P	2
Mercedes-AMG	(Germany) Mercedes-AMG Team GetSpeed (Germany) GetSpeed (Oman) AlManar Racing by GetSpeed	AMG GT3 Evo	130	(Germany) Fabian Schiller	P	2
Mercedes-AMG	(Germany) Mercedes-AMG Team GetSpeed (Germany) GetSpeed (Oman) AlManar Racing by GetSpeed	AMG GT3 Evo	130	(United Kingdom) Adam Christodoulou	P	2
Mercedes-AMG	(Germany) Mercedes-AMG Team GetSpeed (Germany) GetSpeed (Oman) AlManar Racing by GetSpeed	AMG GT3 Evo	777	(Oman) Al Faisal Al Zubair	G	3
Mercedes-AMG	(Germany) Mercedes-AMG Team GetSpeed (Germany) GetSpeed (Oman) AlManar Racing by GetSpeed	AMG GT3 Evo	777	(Austria) Dominik Baumann	G	3
Mercedes-AMG	(Germany) Mercedes-AMG Team GetSpeed (Germany) GetSpeed (Oman) AlManar Racing by GetSpeed	AMG GT3 Evo	777	(Canada) Mikaël Grenier	G	3
Mercedes-AMG	(Germany) Mercedes-AMG Team GetSpeed (Germany) GetSpeed (Oman) AlManar Racing by GetSpeed	AMG GT3 Evo	777	(Switzerland) Philip Ellis	G	3
Mercedes-AMG	(Germany) Mercedes-AMG Team Bilstein by HRT (Note: Car No. 3 and No. 4 entered as Mercedes-AMG Team Bilstein by HRT, car No. 6 entered as Team ADVAN x HRT, and car No. 77 entered as Haupt Racing Team.) (Germany) Team ADVAN x HRT (Germany) Haupt Racing Team	AMG GT3 Evo	3	(Italy) Michele Beretta	P	2
Mercedes-AMG	(Germany) Mercedes-AMG Team Bilstein by HRT (Germany) Team ADVAN x HRT (Germany) Haupt Racing Team	AMG GT3 Evo	3	(United Kingdom) Frank Bird	P	2
Mercedes-AMG	(Germany) Mercedes-AMG Team Bilstein by HRT (Germany) Team ADVAN x HRT (Germany) Haupt Racing Team	AMG GT3 Evo	3	(Germany) Jusuf Owega	P	2
Mercedes-AMG	(Germany) Mercedes-AMG Team Bilstein by HRT (Germany) Team ADVAN x HRT (Germany) Haupt Racing Team	AMG GT3 Evo	3	(India) Arjun Maini	P	2
Mercedes-AMG	(Germany) Mercedes-AMG Team Bilstein by HRT (Germany) Team ADVAN x HRT (Germany) Haupt Racing Team	AMG GT3 Evo	4	(Germany) Maximilian Götz	P	2
Mercedes-AMG	(Germany) Mercedes-AMG Team Bilstein by HRT (Germany) Team ADVAN x HRT (Germany) Haupt Racing Team	AMG GT3 Evo	4	(Spain) Daniel Juncadella	P	2
Mercedes-AMG	(Germany) Mercedes-AMG Team Bilstein by HRT (Germany) Team ADVAN x HRT (Germany) Haupt Racing Team	AMG GT3 Evo	4	(India) Arjun Maini	P	2
Mercedes-AMG	(Germany) Mercedes-AMG Team Bilstein by HRT (Germany) Team ADVAN x HRT (Germany) Haupt Racing Team	AMG GT3 Evo	4	(Germany) Luca Stolz	P	2
Mercedes-AMG	(Germany) Mercedes-AMG Team Bilstein by HRT (Germany) Team ADVAN x HRT (Germany) Haupt Racing Team	AMG GT3 Evo	6	(Estonia) Ralf Aron	PA	2
Mercedes-AMG	(Germany) Mercedes-AMG Team Bilstein by HRT (Germany) Team ADVAN x HRT (Germany) Haupt Racing Team	AMG GT3 Evo	6	(Germany) Dennis Fetzer	PA	2
Mercedes-AMG	(Germany) Mercedes-AMG Team Bilstein by HRT (Germany) Team ADVAN x HRT (Germany) Haupt Racing Team	AMG GT3 Evo	6	(Germany) Hubert Haupt	PA	2
Mercedes-AMG	(Germany) Mercedes-AMG Team Bilstein by HRT (Germany) Team ADVAN x HRT (Germany) Haupt Racing Team	AMG GT3 Evo	6	(Germany) Salman Owega	PA	2
Mercedes-AMG	(Germany) Mercedes-AMG Team Bilstein by HRT (Germany) Team ADVAN x HRT (Germany) Haupt Racing Team	AMG GT3 Evo	77	(India) Arjun Maini	G	3
Mercedes-AMG	(Germany) Mercedes-AMG Team Bilstein by HRT (Germany) Team ADVAN x HRT (Germany) Haupt Racing Team	AMG GT3 Evo	77	(Germany) Jusuf Owega	G	3
Mercedes-AMG	(Germany) Mercedes-AMG Team Bilstein by HRT (Germany) Team ADVAN x HRT (Germany) Haupt Racing Team	AMG GT3 Evo	77	(Italy) Michele Beretta	G	3
Mercedes-AMG	(United States) CrowdStrike by Riley	AMG GT3 Evo	4	(United States) George Kurtz	PA	3
Mercedes-AMG	(United States) CrowdStrike by Riley	AMG GT3 Evo	4	(United States) Colin Braun	PA	3
Mercedes-AMG	(United States) CrowdStrike by Riley	AMG GT3 Evo	4	(United Kingdom) Ian James	PA	3
Mercedes-AMG	(United States) CrowdStrike by Riley	AMG GT3 Evo	4	(Netherlands) Nick Catsburg	PA	3
Mercedes-AMG	(United States) Mercedes-AMG Team Lone Star Racing	AMG GT3 Evo	4	(Spain) Álex Palou	P	4
Mercedes-AMG	(United States) Mercedes-AMG Team Lone Star Racing	AMG GT3 Evo	4	(Germany) Fabian Schiller	P	4
Mercedes-AMG	(United States) Mercedes-AMG Team Lone Star Racing	AMG GT3 Evo	4	(Germany) Luca Stolz	P	4
Mercedes-AMG	(Belgium) Boutsen VDS	AMG GT3 Evo	9	(Germany) Maximilian Götz	P	3
Mercedes-AMG	(Belgium) Boutsen VDS	AMG GT3 Evo	9	(France) Thomas Drouet	P	3
Mercedes-AMG	(Belgium) Boutsen VDS	AMG GT3 Evo	9	(Belgium) Ulysse de Pauw	P	3
Mercedes-AMG	(Belgium) Boutsen VDS	AMG GT3 Evo	10	(France) Aurélien Panis	S	3
Mercedes-AMG	(Belgium) Boutsen VDS	AMG GT3 Evo	10	(France) César Gazeau	S	3
Mercedes-AMG	(Belgium) Boutsen VDS	AMG GT3 Evo	10	(United States) Roee Meyuhas	S	3
Mercedes-AMG	(Belgium) Boutsen VDS	AMG GT3 Evo	10	(France) Sebastien Baud	S	3
Mercedes-AMG	(Germany) Schnitzelalm Racing	AMG GT3 Evo	11	(Germany) Jay Mo Härtling	PA	2
Mercedes-AMG	(Germany) Schnitzelalm Racing	AMG GT3 Evo	11	(Germany) Kenneth Heyer	PA	2
Mercedes-AMG	(Germany) Schnitzelalm Racing	AMG GT3 Evo	11	(Germany) Marcel Marchewicz	PA	2
Mercedes-AMG	(China) Uno Racing Team with Landgraf	AMG GT3 Evo	16	(Hong Kong) "Rio"	PA	3
Mercedes-AMG	(China) Uno Racing Team with Landgraf	AMG GT3 Evo	16	(China) David Pun	PA	3
Mercedes-AMG	(China) Uno Racing Team with Landgraf	AMG GT3 Evo	16	(Macau) Kevin Tse	PA	3
Mercedes-AMG	(China) Uno Racing Team with Landgraf	AMG GT3 Evo	16	(Netherlands) Indy Dontje	PA	3
Mercedes-AMG	(United States) Heart of Racing by SPS	AMG GT3 Evo	27	(United Kingdom) Ross Gunn	PA	1
Mercedes-AMG	(United States) Heart of Racing by SPS	AMG GT3 Evo	27	(United Kingdom) Ian James	PA	1
Mercedes-AMG	(United States) Heart of Racing by SPS	AMG GT3 Evo	27	(Spain) Alex Riberas	PA	1
Mercedes-AMG	(Australia) Supabarn Supermarkets/Tigani Motorsport	AMG GT3 Evo	47	(Australia) James Koundouris	S	1
Mercedes-AMG	(Australia) Supabarn Supermarkets/Tigani Motorsport	AMG GT3 Evo	47	(Australia) Theo Koundouris	S	1
Mercedes-AMG	(Australia) Supabarn Supermarkets/Tigani Motorsport	AMG GT3 Evo	47	(Australia) David Russell	S	1
Mercedes-AMG	(Australia) Supabarn Supermarkets/Tigani Motorsport	AMG GT3 Evo	47	(Australia) Jonathon Webb	S	1
Mercedes-AMG	(Australia) MMotorsport	AMG GT3 Evo	48	(Australia) Jack Le Brocq	PA	1
Mercedes-AMG	(Australia) MMotorsport	AMG GT3 Evo	48	(Australia) Justin McMillan	PA	1
Mercedes-AMG	(Australia) MMotorsport	AMG GT3 Evo	48	(Australia) Garth Walden	PA	1
Mercedes-AMG	(Australia) MMotorsport	AMG GT3 Evo	48	(Australia) Glen Wood	PA	1
Mercedes-AMG	(United States) Mercedes-AMG Team MANN-FILTER (Note: Car No. 48 entered as Mercedes-AMG Team MANN-FILTER, and car No. 58 entered as Winward Racing.) (United States) Winward Racing	AMG GT3 Evo	48	(Austria) Lucas Auer	P	3
Mercedes-AMG	(United States) Mercedes-AMG Team MANN-FILTER (United States) Winward Racing	AMG GT3 Evo	48	(Germany) Maro Engel	P	3
Mercedes-AMG	(United States) Mercedes-AMG Team MANN-FILTER (United States) Winward Racing	AMG GT3 Evo	48	(Canada) Daniel Morad	P	3
Mercedes-AMG	(United States) Mercedes-AMG Team MANN-FILTER (United States) Winward Racing	AMG GT3 Evo	57	(Thailand) Tanart Sathienthirakul	S	3
Mercedes-AMG	(United States) Mercedes-AMG Team MANN-FILTER (United States) Winward Racing	AMG GT3 Evo	57	(Netherlands) Colin Caresani	S	3
Mercedes-AMG	(United States) Mercedes-AMG Team MANN-FILTER (United States) Winward Racing	AMG GT3 Evo	57	(Netherlands) "Daan Arrow"	S	3
Mercedes-AMG	(Bahrain) 2 Seas Motorsport	AMG GT3 Evo	60	(Bahrain) Isa Al Khalifa	G	3
Mercedes-AMG	(Bahrain) 2 Seas Motorsport	AMG GT3 Evo	60	(United Kingdom) Frank Bird	G	3
Mercedes-AMG	(Bahrain) 2 Seas Motorsport	AMG GT3 Evo	60	(Croatia) Martin Kodrić	G	3
Mercedes-AMG	(Bahrain) 2 Seas Motorsport	AMG GT3 Evo	60	(United Kingdom) Lewis Williamson	G	3
Mercedes-AMG	(Australia) SunEnergy1 (Note: Car No. 75 entered as SunEnergy1 in round 1, and entered as 75 Express in round 4.) (Australia) 75 Express	AMG GT3 Evo	75	(Andorra) Jules Gounon	P	1
Mercedes-AMG	(Australia) SunEnergy1 (Australia) 75 Express	AMG GT3 Evo	75	(Australia) Kenny Habul	P	1
Mercedes-AMG	(Australia) SunEnergy1 (Australia) 75 Express	AMG GT3 Evo	75	(Germany) Luca Stolz	P	1
Mercedes-AMG	(Australia) SunEnergy1 (Australia) 75 Express	AMG GT3 Evo	75	(Austria) Lucas Auer	PA	4
Mercedes-AMG	(Australia) SunEnergy1 (Australia) 75 Express	AMG GT3 Evo	75	(Australia) Kenny Habul	PA	4
Mercedes-AMG	(Australia) SunEnergy1 (Australia) 75 Express	AMG GT3 Evo	75	(Australia) Jayden Ojeda	PA	4
Mercedes-AMG	(Hong Kong) Mercedes-AMG Team Craft-Bamboo Racing	AMG GT3 Evo	77	(Germany) Maximilian Götz	P	1
Mercedes-AMG	(Hong Kong) Mercedes-AMG Team Craft-Bamboo Racing	AMG GT3 Evo	77	(Spain) Daniel Juncadella	P	1
Mercedes-AMG	(Hong Kong) Mercedes-AMG Team Craft-Bamboo Racing	AMG GT3 Evo	77	(Australia) Jayden Ojeda	P	1
Mercedes-AMG	(Hong Kong) Mercedes-AMG Team Craft-Bamboo Racing	AMG GT3 Evo	77	(Macau) Kevin Tse	P	1
Mercedes-AMG	(Australia) Triple Eight JMR (Note: Car No. 88 entered as Triple Eight JMR, car No. 888 entered as National Storage Racing in round 1, and entered as Triple Eight JMR in rounds 3 and 4.) (Australia) National Storage Racing	AMG GT3 Evo	88	(Malaysia) Prince Jeffri Ibrahim	PA	1
Mercedes-AMG	(Australia) Triple Eight JMR (Australia) National Storage Racing	AMG GT3 Evo	88	(Australia) Jordan Love	PA	1
Mercedes-AMG	(Australia) Triple Eight JMR (Australia) National Storage Racing	AMG GT3 Evo	88	(Australia) Jamie Whincup	PA	1
Mercedes-AMG	(Australia) Triple Eight JMR (Australia) National Storage Racing	AMG GT3 Evo	888	(Australia) Will Brown	P	1
Mercedes-AMG	(Australia) Triple Eight JMR (Australia) National Storage Racing	AMG GT3 Evo	888	(Australia) Broc Feeney	P	1
Mercedes-AMG	(Australia) Triple Eight JMR (Australia) National Storage Racing	AMG GT3 Evo	888	(Canada) Mikaël Grenier	P	1
Mercedes-AMG	(Australia) Triple Eight JMR (Australia) National Storage Racing	AMG GT3 Evo	888	(Malaysia) Prince Jeffri Ibrahim	PA	3–4
Mercedes-AMG	(Australia) Triple Eight JMR (Australia) National Storage Racing	AMG GT3 Evo	888	(Australia) Jordan Love	PA	3–4
Mercedes-AMG	(Australia) Triple Eight JMR (Australia) National Storage Racing	AMG GT3 Evo	888	(United Kingdom) Alexander Sims	PA	3
Mercedes-AMG	(Australia) Triple Eight JMR (Australia) National Storage Racing	AMG GT3 Evo	888	(Austria) Martin Konrad	PA	3
Mercedes-AMG	(Australia) Triple Eight JMR (Australia) National Storage Racing	AMG GT3 Evo	888	(India) Arjun Maini	PA	4
Mercedes-AMG	(Argentina) Madpanda Motorsport	AMG GT3 Evo	90	(Argentina) Ezequiel Pérez Companc	S	3
Mercedes-AMG	(Argentina) Madpanda Motorsport	AMG GT3 Evo	90	(Germany) Patrick Assenheimer	S	3
Mercedes-AMG	(Argentina) Madpanda Motorsport	AMG GT3 Evo	90	(Poland) Karol Basz	S	3
Mercedes-AMG	(Argentina) Madpanda Motorsport	AMG GT3 Evo	90	(Switzerland) Alain Valente	S	3
Mercedes-AMG	(United States) Regulator Racing	AMG GT3 Evo	91	(United States) Jeff Burton	PA	4
Mercedes-AMG	(United States) Regulator Racing	AMG GT3 Evo	91	(Switzerland) Philip Ellis	PA	4
Mercedes-AMG	(United States) Regulator Racing	AMG GT3 Evo	91	(Finland) Elias Seppänen	PA	4
Mercedes-AMG	(Hong Kong) Mercedes-AMG Team GruppeM Racing	AMG GT3 Evo	130	(Germany) Maro Engel	P	1, 4
Mercedes-AMG	(Hong Kong) Mercedes-AMG Team GruppeM Racing	AMG GT3 Evo	130	(Brazil) Felipe Fraga	P	1
Mercedes-AMG	(Hong Kong) Mercedes-AMG Team GruppeM Racing	AMG GT3 Evo	130	(Australia) David Reynolds	P	1
Mercedes-AMG	(Hong Kong) Mercedes-AMG Team GruppeM Racing	AMG GT3 Evo	130	(Estonia) Ralf Aron	P	3
Mercedes-AMG	(Hong Kong) Mercedes-AMG Team GruppeM Racing	AMG GT3 Evo	130	(Spain) Daniel Juncadella	P	3
Mercedes-AMG	(Hong Kong) Mercedes-AMG Team GruppeM Racing	AMG GT3 Evo	130	(Denmark) Frederik Vesti	P	3
Mercedes-AMG	(Hong Kong) Mercedes-AMG Team GruppeM Racing	AMG GT3 Evo	130	(Andorra) Jules Gounon	P	4
Mercedes-AMG	(Hong Kong) Mercedes-AMG Team GruppeM Racing	AMG GT3 Evo	130	(Canada) Mikaël Grenier	P	4
Mercedes-AMG	(Australia) Scott Taylor Motorsport	AMG GT3 Evo	222	(Australia) Craig Lowndes	P	1
Mercedes-AMG	(Australia) Scott Taylor Motorsport	AMG GT3 Evo	222	(Australia) Thomas Randle	P	1
Mercedes-AMG	(Australia) Scott Taylor Motorsport	AMG GT3 Evo	222	(Australia) Cameron Waters	P	1
Porsche	(Germany) Herberth Motorsport (Note: Car No. 5, No. 10 and No. 91 entered as Herberth Motorsport, car No. 24 entered as Lionspeed GP, car No. 80 entered as Lionspeed x Herberth, car No. 92 entered as SSR Herberth, and Car No. 911 entered as Pure Racing.) (Germany) Lionspeed GP (Germany) Lionspeed x Herberth (Germany) SSR Herberth (Lithuania) Pure Rxcing	911 GT3 R (992)	5	(Australia) Matt Campbell	P	2
Porsche	(Germany) Herberth Motorsport (Germany) Lionspeed GP (Germany) Lionspeed x Herberth (Germany) SSR Herberth (Lithuania) Pure Rxcing	911 GT3 R (992)	5	(Germany) Vincent Kolb	P	2
Porsche	(Germany) Herberth Motorsport (Germany) Lionspeed GP (Germany) Lionspeed x Herberth (Germany) SSR Herberth (Lithuania) Pure Rxcing	911 GT3 R (992)	5	(Norway) Dennis Olsen	P	2
Porsche	(Germany) Herberth Motorsport (Germany) Lionspeed GP (Germany) Lionspeed x Herberth (Germany) SSR Herberth (Lithuania) Pure Rxcing	911 GT3 R (992)	5	(Germany) Robert Renauer	P	2
Porsche	(Germany) Herberth Motorsport (Germany) Lionspeed GP (Germany) Lionspeed x Herberth (Germany) SSR Herberth (Lithuania) Pure Rxcing	911 GT3 R (992)	10	(Hong Kong) Antares Au	PA	4
Porsche	(Germany) Herberth Motorsport (Germany) Lionspeed GP (Germany) Lionspeed x Herberth (Germany) SSR Herberth (Lithuania) Pure Rxcing	911 GT3 R (992)	10	(Netherlands) Loek Hartog	PA	4
Porsche	(Germany) Herberth Motorsport (Germany) Lionspeed GP (Germany) Lionspeed x Herberth (Germany) SSR Herberth (Lithuania) Pure Rxcing	911 GT3 R (992)	10	(Switzerland) Patric Niederhauser	PA	4
Porsche	(Germany) Herberth Motorsport (Germany) Lionspeed GP (Germany) Lionspeed x Herberth (Germany) SSR Herberth (Lithuania) Pure Rxcing	911 GT3 R (992)	24	(Hong Kong) Antares Au	PA	2
Porsche	(Germany) Herberth Motorsport (Germany) Lionspeed GP (Germany) Lionspeed x Herberth (Germany) SSR Herberth (Lithuania) Pure Rxcing	911 GT3 R (992)	24	(Netherlands) Indy Dontje	PA	2
Porsche	(Germany) Herberth Motorsport (Germany) Lionspeed GP (Germany) Lionspeed x Herberth (Germany) SSR Herberth (Lithuania) Pure Rxcing	911 GT3 R (992)	24	(Germany) Patrick Kolb	PA	2
Porsche	(Germany) Herberth Motorsport (Germany) Lionspeed GP (Germany) Lionspeed x Herberth (Germany) SSR Herberth (Lithuania) Pure Rxcing	911 GT3 R (992)	24	(Switzerland) Patric Niederhauser	PA	2
Porsche	(Germany) Herberth Motorsport (Germany) Lionspeed GP (Germany) Lionspeed x Herberth (Germany) SSR Herberth (Lithuania) Pure Rxcing	911 GT3 R (992)	80	(Hong Kong) Antares Au	B	3
Porsche	(Germany) Herberth Motorsport (Germany) Lionspeed GP (Germany) Lionspeed x Herberth (Germany) SSR Herberth (Lithuania) Pure Rxcing	911 GT3 R (992)	80	(Belgium) Alessio Picariello	B	3
Porsche	(Germany) Herberth Motorsport (Germany) Lionspeed GP (Germany) Lionspeed x Herberth (Germany) SSR Herberth (Lithuania) Pure Rxcing	911 GT3 R (992)	80	(Estonia) Martin Rump	B	3
Porsche	(Germany) Herberth Motorsport (Germany) Lionspeed GP (Germany) Lionspeed x Herberth (Germany) SSR Herberth (Lithuania) Pure Rxcing	911 GT3 R (992)	80	(Switzerland) Alexander Fach	B	3
Porsche	(Germany) Herberth Motorsport (Germany) Lionspeed GP (Germany) Lionspeed x Herberth (Germany) SSR Herberth (Lithuania) Pure Rxcing	911 GT3 R (992)	91	(Germany) Ralf Bohn	B	3
Porsche	(Germany) Herberth Motorsport (Germany) Lionspeed GP (Germany) Lionspeed x Herberth (Germany) SSR Herberth (Lithuania) Pure Rxcing	911 GT3 R (992)	91	(Germany) Robert Renauer	B	3
Porsche	(Germany) Herberth Motorsport (Germany) Lionspeed GP (Germany) Lionspeed x Herberth (Germany) SSR Herberth (Lithuania) Pure Rxcing	911 GT3 R (992)	91	(Netherlands) Morris Schuring	B	3
Porsche	(Germany) Herberth Motorsport (Germany) Lionspeed GP (Germany) Lionspeed x Herberth (Germany) SSR Herberth (Lithuania) Pure Rxcing	911 GT3 R (992)	91	(Germany) Alfred Renauer	B	3
Porsche	(Germany) Herberth Motorsport (Germany) Lionspeed GP (Germany) Lionspeed x Herberth (Germany) SSR Herberth (Lithuania) Pure Rxcing	911 GT3 R (992)	92	(France) Mathieu Jaminet	P	3
Porsche	(Germany) Herberth Motorsport (Germany) Lionspeed GP (Germany) Lionspeed x Herberth (Germany) SSR Herberth (Lithuania) Pure Rxcing	911 GT3 R (992)	92	(Australia) Matt Campbell	P	3
Porsche	(Germany) Herberth Motorsport (Germany) Lionspeed GP (Germany) Lionspeed x Herberth (Germany) SSR Herberth (Lithuania) Pure Rxcing	911 GT3 R (992)	92	(France) Frédéric Makowiecki	P	3
Porsche	(Germany) Herberth Motorsport (Germany) Lionspeed GP (Germany) Lionspeed x Herberth (Germany) SSR Herberth (Lithuania) Pure Rxcing	911 GT3 R (992)	911	(United Kingdom) Alex Malykhin	P	3
Porsche	(Germany) Herberth Motorsport (Germany) Lionspeed GP (Germany) Lionspeed x Herberth (Germany) SSR Herberth (Lithuania) Pure Rxcing	911 GT3 R (992)	911	(Austria) Klaus Bachler	P	3
Porsche	(Germany) Herberth Motorsport (Germany) Lionspeed GP (Germany) Lionspeed x Herberth (Germany) SSR Herberth (Lithuania) Pure Rxcing	911 GT3 R (992)	911	(Germany) Joel Sturm	P	3
Porsche	(China) Phantom Global Racing	911 GT3 R (992)	13	(Denmark) Bastian Buus	P	1
Porsche	(China) Phantom Global Racing	911 GT3 R (992)	13	(Sweden) Joel Eriksson	P	1
Porsche	(China) Phantom Global Racing	911 GT3 R (992)	13	(New Zealand) Jaxon Evans	P	1
Porsche	(China) Phantom Global Racing	911 GT3 R (992)	23	(Sweden) Joel Eriksson	P	3
Porsche	(China) Phantom Global Racing	911 GT3 R (992)	23	(New Zealand) Jaxon Evans	P	3
Porsche	(China) Phantom Global Racing	911 GT3 R (992)	23	(Austria) Thomas Preining	P	3
Porsche	(Germany) Car Collection Motorsport	911 GT3 R (992)	21	(Switzerland) Alex Fontana	PA	4
Porsche	(Germany) Car Collection Motorsport	911 GT3 R (992)	21	(Germany) Yannick Mettler	PA	4
Porsche	(Germany) Car Collection Motorsport	911 GT3 R (992)	21	(United States) 'Hash'	PA	4
Porsche	(France) Schumacher CLRT	911 GT3 R (992)	22	(France) Dorian Boccolacci	P	3
Porsche	(France) Schumacher CLRT	911 GT3 R (992)	22	(Turkey) Ayhancan Güven	P	3
Porsche	(France) Schumacher CLRT	911 GT3 R (992)	22	(Germany) Laurin Heinrich	P	3
Porsche	(United States) GMG Racing	911 GT3 R (992)	32	(Australia) Tom Sargent	PA	4
Porsche	(United States) GMG Racing	911 GT3 R (992)	32	(United States) Kyle Washington	PA	4
Porsche	(United States) GMG Racing	911 GT3 R (992)	32	(Turkey) Ayhancan Güven	PA	4
Porsche	(Germany) Falken Motorsports	911 GT3 R (992)	33	(France) Julien Andlauer	P	2
Porsche	(Germany) Falken Motorsports	911 GT3 R (992)	33	(Austria) Klaus Bachler	P	2
Porsche	(Germany) Falken Motorsports	911 GT3 R (992)	33	(Germany) Sven Müller	P	2
Porsche	(Germany) Falken Motorsports	911 GT3 R (992)	33	(Belgium) Alessio Picariello	P	2
Porsche	(Germany) Falken Motorsports	911 GT3 R (992)	44	(Sweden) Joel Eriksson	P	2
Porsche	(Germany) Falken Motorsports	911 GT3 R (992)	44	(Germany) Tim Heinemann	P	2
Porsche	(Germany) Falken Motorsports	911 GT3 R (992)	44	(Germany) Nico Menzel	P	2
Porsche	(Germany) Falken Motorsports	911 GT3 R (992)	44	(Austria) Martin Ragginger	P	2
Porsche	(Italy) Dinamic GT	911 GT3 R (992)	54	(Denmark) Bastian Buus	P	2
Porsche	(Italy) Dinamic GT	911 GT3 R (992)	54	(Germany) Marvin Dienst	P	2
Porsche	(Italy) Dinamic GT	911 GT3 R (992)	54	(Germany) Marco Holzer	P	2
Porsche	(Italy) Dinamic GT	911 GT3 R (992)	54	(Germany) Marco Seefried	P	2
Porsche	(Italy) Dinamic GT	911 GT3 R (992)	54	(Austria) Philipp Sager	B	3
Porsche	(Italy) Dinamic GT	911 GT3 R (992)	54	(Germany) Marvin Dienst	B	3
Porsche	(Italy) Dinamic GT	911 GT3 R (992)	54	(Portugal) Guilherme Oliveira	B	3
Porsche	(Italy) Dinamic GT	911 GT3 R (992)	54	(Austria) Christopher Zöchling	B	3
Porsche	(Italy) Dinamic GT	911 GT3 R (992)	55	(France) Théo Nouet	S	3
Porsche	(Italy) Dinamic GT	911 GT3 R (992)	55	(Netherlands) Jop Rappange	S	3
Porsche	(Italy) Dinamic GT	911 GT3 R (992)	55	(Norway) Marius Nakken	S	3
Porsche	(Italy) Dinamic GT	911 GT3 R (992)	55	(Finland) Axel Blom	S	3
Porsche	(New Zealand) EBM	911 GT3 R (992)	61	(Malaysia) Adrian D'Silva	PA	3–4
Porsche	(New Zealand) EBM	911 GT3 R (992)	61	(New Zealand) Brendon Leitch	PA	3–4
Porsche	(New Zealand) EBM	911 GT3 R (992)	61	(New Zealand) Earl Bamber	PA	3
Porsche	(New Zealand) EBM	911 GT3 R (992)	61	(China) Kerong Li	PA	3
Porsche	(New Zealand) EBM	911 GT3 R (992)	61	(Denmark) Bastian Buus	PA	4
Porsche	(United States) RennSport1	911 GT3 R (992)	85	(United States) Trent Hindman	PA	4
Porsche	(United States) RennSport1	911 GT3 R (992)	85	(United States) Jake Pedersen	PA	4
Porsche	(United States) RennSport1	911 GT3 R (992)	85	(Netherlands) Kay van Berlo	PA	4
Porsche	(Germany) Rutronik Racing	911 GT3 R (992)	96	(Switzerland) Patric Niederhauser	P	3
Porsche	(Germany) Rutronik Racing	911 GT3 R (992)	96	(Germany) Sven Müller	P	3
Porsche	(Germany) Rutronik Racing	911 GT3 R (992)	96	(France) Julien Andlauer	P	3
Porsche	(Germany) Rutronik Racing	911 GT3 R (992)	97	(United States) Dustin Blattner	B	3
Porsche	(Germany) Rutronik Racing	911 GT3 R (992)	97	(Germany) Dennis Marschall	B	3
Porsche	(Germany) Rutronik Racing	911 GT3 R (992)	97	(Netherlands) Loek Hartog	B	3
Porsche	(Germany) Rutronik Racing	911 GT3 R (992)	97	(Canada) Zacharie Robichon	B	3
Porsche	(United States) Wright Motorsports	911 GT3 R (992)	120	(United States) Adam Adelson	P	4
Porsche	(United States) Wright Motorsports	911 GT3 R (992)	120	(United States) Elliott Skeer	P	4
Porsche	(United States) Wright Motorsports	911 GT3 R (992)	120	(Germany) Laurin Heinrich	P	4
Porsche	(Germany) Manthey EMA	911 GT3 R (992)	911	(France) Kévin Estre	P	2
Porsche	(Germany) Manthey EMA	911 GT3 R (992)	911	(Turkey) Ayhancan Güven	P	2
Porsche	(Germany) Manthey EMA	911 GT3 R (992)	911	(Austria) Thomas Preining	P	2
Porsche	(Germany) Manthey EMA	911 GT3 R (992)	911	(Belgium) Laurens Vanthoor	P	2
Porsche	(Germany) Manthey EMA	911 GT3 R (992)	912	(Australia) Matt Campbell	P	1
Porsche	(Germany) Manthey EMA	911 GT3 R (992)	912	(Turkey) Ayhancan Güven	P	1
Porsche	(Germany) Manthey EMA	911 GT3 R (992)	912	(Belgium) Laurens Vanthoor	P	1
Porsche	(Chinese Taipei) HubAuto Racing	911 GT3 R (992)	992	(France) Kévin Estre	P	3
Porsche	(Chinese Taipei) HubAuto Racing	911 GT3 R (992)	992	(France) Patrick Pilet	P	3
Porsche	(Chinese Taipei) HubAuto Racing	911 GT3 R (992)	992	(Belgium) Laurens Vanthoor	P	3
Porsche	(Australia) The Bend Manthey EMA	911 GT3 R (991.2)	911	(United Kingdom) Harry King	PA	1
Porsche	(Australia) The Bend Manthey EMA	911 GT3 R (991.2)	911	(Belgium) Alessio Picariello	PA	1
Porsche	(Australia) The Bend Manthey EMA	911 GT3 R (991.2)	911	(Australia) Yasser Shahin	PA	1

Icon	Class
P	Pro Cup
G	Gold Cup
S	Silver Cup
B	Bronze Cup
PA	Pro-Am Cup
Am	Am Cup

Intercontinental GT Challenge Independent Cup
Manufacturer	Team	Car	No.	Drivers	Class	Rounds
Mercedes-AMG	(Australia) Triple Eight JMR	AMG GT3 Evo	88	(Malaysia) Prince Jeffri Ibrahim	PA	1
Mercedes-AMG	(Australia) Triple Eight JMR	AMG GT3 Evo	88	(Australia) Jordan Love	PA	1
Mercedes-AMG	(Australia) Triple Eight JMR	AMG GT3 Evo	88	(Australia) Jamie Whincup	PA	1
Mercedes-AMG	(Australia) Triple Eight JMR	AMG GT3 Evo	888	(Malaysia) Prince Jeffri Ibrahim	PA	3–4
Mercedes-AMG	(Australia) Triple Eight JMR	AMG GT3 Evo	888	(Australia) Jordan Love	PA	3–4
Mercedes-AMG	(Australia) Triple Eight JMR	AMG GT3 Evo	888	(United Kingdom) Alexander Sims	PA	3
Mercedes-AMG	(Australia) Triple Eight JMR	AMG GT3 Evo	888	(Austria) Martin Konrad	PA	3
Mercedes-AMG	(Australia) Triple Eight JMR	AMG GT3 Evo	888	(India) Arjun Maini	PA	4
Porsche	(Germany) Herberth Motorsport (Note: Car No. 10 entered as Herberth Motorsport, car No. 24 entered as Lionspeed GP, and car No. 80 entered as Lionspeed x Herberth.) (Germany) Lionspeed GP (Germany) Lionspeed x Herberth	911 GT3 R (992)	10	(Hong Kong) Antares Au	PA	4
Porsche	(Germany) Herberth Motorsport (Germany) Lionspeed GP (Germany) Lionspeed x Herberth	911 GT3 R (992)	10	(Netherlands) Loek Hartog	PA	4
Porsche	(Germany) Herberth Motorsport (Germany) Lionspeed GP (Germany) Lionspeed x Herberth	911 GT3 R (992)	10	(Switzerland) Patric Niederhauser	PA	4
Porsche	(Germany) Herberth Motorsport (Germany) Lionspeed GP (Germany) Lionspeed x Herberth	911 GT3 R (992)	24	(Hong Kong) Antares Au	PA	2
Porsche	(Germany) Herberth Motorsport (Germany) Lionspeed GP (Germany) Lionspeed x Herberth	911 GT3 R (992)	24	(Netherlands) Indy Dontje	PA	2
Porsche	(Germany) Herberth Motorsport (Germany) Lionspeed GP (Germany) Lionspeed x Herberth	911 GT3 R (992)	24	(Germany) Patrick Kolb	PA	2
Porsche	(Germany) Herberth Motorsport (Germany) Lionspeed GP (Germany) Lionspeed x Herberth	911 GT3 R (992)	24	(Switzerland) Patric Niederhauser	PA	2
Porsche	(Germany) Herberth Motorsport (Germany) Lionspeed GP (Germany) Lionspeed x Herberth	911 GT3 R (992)	80	(Hong Kong) Antares Au	B	3
Porsche	(Germany) Herberth Motorsport (Germany) Lionspeed GP (Germany) Lionspeed x Herberth	911 GT3 R (992)	80	(Belgium) Alessio Picariello	B	3
Porsche	(Germany) Herberth Motorsport (Germany) Lionspeed GP (Germany) Lionspeed x Herberth	911 GT3 R (992)	80	(Estonia) Martin Rump	B	3
Porsche	(Germany) Herberth Motorsport (Germany) Lionspeed GP (Germany) Lionspeed x Herberth	911 GT3 R (992)	80	(Switzerland) Alexander Fach	B	3
Porsche	(New Zealand) EBM	911 GT3 R (992)	61	(Malaysia) Adrian D'Silva	PA	3–4
Porsche	(New Zealand) EBM	911 GT3 R (992)	61	(New Zealand) Brendon Leitch	PA	3–4
Porsche	(New Zealand) EBM	911 GT3 R (992)	61	(New Zealand) Earl Bamber	PA	3
Porsche	(New Zealand) EBM	911 GT3 R (992)	61	(China) Kerong Li	PA	3
Porsche	(New Zealand) EBM	911 GT3 R (992)	61	(Denmark) Bastian Buus	PA	4

== Championship standings ==
Scoring system

Championship points were awarded for the first ten positions in each race. Entries were required to complete 75% of the winning car's race distance in order to be classified and earn points. Individual drivers were required to participate for a minimum of 25 minutes in order to earn championship points in any race. A manufacturer only received points for its two highest placed cars in each round.

Position	**1st**	**2nd**	**3rd**	**4th**	**5th**	**6th**	**7th**	**8th**	**9th**	**10th**
Points	25	18	15	12	10	8	6	4	2	1

=== Drivers' championships ===
The results indicate the classification relative to other drivers in the series, not the classification in the race.

Pos.	Driver	Manufacturer	BAT (Australia)	NÜR (Germany)	SPA (Belgium)	IND (United States)	Points
1	(Belgium) Charles Weerts	BMW	Ret	**2**	1	1	68
2	(Turkey) Ayhancan Güven	Porsche	1	1	Ret	Ret	50
2	(South Africa) Sheldon van der Linde (Belgium) Dries Vanthoor	BMW	Ret	Ret	1	1	50
2	(Belgium) Laurens Vanthoor	Porsche	1	1	Ret		50
3	(Canada) Mikaël Grenier	Mercedes-AMG	5	Ret	3	3	40
4	(Australia) Matt Campbell	Porsche	1	11	4		37
5	(Germany) Max Hesse (United Kingdom) Dan Harper	BMW		**2**	2	13	36
6	(Germany) Luca Stolz	Mercedes-AMG	2	3	Ret	10	34
7	(Andorra) Jules Gounon	Mercedes-AMG	2	Ret	Ret	3	33
8	(Brazil) Augusto Farfus	BMW		5	2	13	28
8	(Switzerland) Patric Niederhauser	Porsche		6	5	**5**	28
9	(Austria) Thomas Preining	Porsche		1	11		25
9	(France) Kévin Estre	Porsche		1	Ret		25
10	(Switzerland) Raffaele Marciello (Belgium) Maxime Martin	BMW	4	5	9		24
11	(Germany) Sven Müller (France) Julien Andlauer	Porsche		4	5		22
11	(Hong Kong) Antares Au	Porsche		6	8	**5**	22
12	(Sweden) Joel Eriksson	Porsche	3	7	11		21
12	(Germany) Maximilian Götz	Mercedes-AMG	Ret	3	7		21
12	(Switzerland) Philip Ellis	Mercedes-AMG		Ret	3	7	21
12	(Germany) Maro Engel	Mercedes-AMG	7	Ret	Ret	3	21
13	(Belgium) Alessio Picariello	Porsche	8	4	8		20
14	(Australia) Kenny Habul	Mercedes-AMG	2			Ret	18
14	(Germany) Laurin Heinrich	Porsche			Ret	2	18
14	(United States) Elliott Skeer (United States) Adam Adelson	Porsche				2	18
15	(Denmark) Bastian Buus	Porsche	3	9		11	16
16	(New Zealand) Jaxon Evans	Porsche	3		11		15
16	(Oman) Al Faisal Al Zubair (Austria) Dominik Baummann	Mercedes-AMG			3		15
16	(Spain) Daniel Juncadella	Mercedes-AMG	Ret	3	Ret		15
17	(Italy) Valentino Rossi	BMW	4		9		14
18	(France) Mathieu Jaminet (France) Frédéric Makowiecki	Porsche			4		12
18	(India) Arjun Maini	Mercedes-AMG		8	6	Ret	12
18	(Italy) Michele Beretta (Germany) Jusuf Owega	Mercedes-AMG		8	6		12
18	(Austria) Klaus Bachler	Porsche		4	Ret		12
18	(United States) Trent Hindman (United States) Jake Pedersen (Netherlands) Kay van Berlo	Porsche				4	12
19	(Australia) Will Brown (Australia) Broc Feeney	Mercedes-AMG	5				10
19	(Germany) Marco Wittmann	BMW		5	Ret		10
19	(Netherlands) Loek Hartog	Porsche			Ret	5	10
20	(Australia) Craig Lowndes (Australia) Thomas Randle (Australia) Cameron Waters	Mercedes-AMG	6				8
20	(Netherlands) Indy Dontje	Porsche Mercedes-AMG		6	17		8
20	(Germany) Patrick Kolb	Porsche		6			8
20	(United States) Robby Foley (United States) Justin Rothberg (United States) Patrick Gallagher	BMW				6	8
21	(Brazil) Felipe Fraga (Australia) David Reynolds	Mercedes-AMG	7				6
21	(France) Thomas Drouet (Belgium) Ulysse de Pauw	Mercedes-AMG			7		6
21	(Germany) Tim Heinemann (Germany) Nico Menzel (Austria) Martin Ragginger	Porsche		7			6
21	(Finland) Elias Seppänen (United States) Jeff Burton	Mercedes-AMG				7	6
22	(United Kingdom) Harry King (Australia) Yasser Shahin	Porsche	8				4
22	(Switzerland) Alexander Fach (Estonia) Martin Rump	Porsche			8		4
22	(United Kingdom) Frank Bird	Mercedes-AMG		8	19		4
22	(Austria) Philipp Eng	BMW			Ret	8	4
22	(United States) Bill Auberlen (United States) Varun Choksey	BMW				8	4
23	(Switzerland) Yannick Mettler	Mercedes-AMG Porsche			10	9	3
24	(United Kingdom) Ian James	Mercedes-AMG	9		14		2
24	(United Kingdom) Ross Gunn (Spain) Alex Riberas	Mercedes-AMG	9				2
24	(Germany) Marco Holzer (Germany) Marco Seefried	Porsche		9			2
24	(Germany) Marvin Dienst	Porsche		9	Ret		2
24	(Switzerland) Alex Fontana (United States) 'Hash'	Porsche				9	2
25	(Australia) Jamie Whincup	Mercedes-AMG	10				1
25	(Malaysia) Prince Jeffri Ibrahim (Australia) Jordan Love	Mercedes-AMG	10		Ret	Ret	1
25	(United States) Anthony Bartone (United Kingdom) James Kell (United Kingdom) Aaron Walker	Mercedes-AMG			10		1
25	(Germany) Marcel Marchewicz (Germany) Jay Mo Härtling (Germany) Kenneth Heyer	Mercedes-AMG		10			1
25	(Spain) Álex Palou	Mercedes-AMG				10	1
-	(Australia) James Koundouris (Australia) Theo Koundouris (Australia) David Russell (Australia) Jonathon Webb	Mercedes-AMG	11				0
-	(Germany) Vincent Kolb (Germany) Robert Renauer (Norway) Dennis Olsen	Porsche		11			0
-	(Malaysia) Adrien D'Silva (New Zealand) Brendon Leitch	Porsche			Ret	11	0
-	(Australia) Jack Le Brocq (Australia) Justin McMillan (Australia) Garth Walden (Australia) Glen Wood	Mercedes-AMG	12				0
-	(Germany) Hubert Haupt (Germany) Salman Owega (Germany) Dennis Fetzer	Mercedes-AMG		12			0
-	(Estonia) Ralf Aron	Mercedes-AMG		12	Ret		0
-	(France) Théo Nouet (Netherlands) Jop Rappange (Norway) Marius Nakken (Finland) Axel Blom	Porsche			12		0
-	(United Kingdom) Nick Yelloly	BMW			Ret	12	0
-	(United States) Andy Lee (United States) Elias Sabo	BMW				12	0
-	(Thailand) Tanart Sathienthirakul (Netherlands) "Daan Arrow" (Netherlands) Colin Caresani (France) Esteban Masson	Mercedes-AMG			13		0
-	(United States) George Kurtz (United States) Colin Braun (Netherlands) Nicky Catsburg	Mercedes-AMG			14		0
-	(Canada) Samantha Tan (United States) Neil Verhagen (United States) John Capestro-Dubets	BMW				14	0
-	(Argentina) Ezequiel Pérez Companc (Germany) Patrick Assenheimer (Poland) Karol Basz (Switzerland) Alain Valente	Mercedes-AMG			15		0
-	(United States) Connor De Phillippi	BMW			16	Ret	0
-	(United Kingdom) Darren Leung (Brazil) Pedro Ebrahim (United Kingdom) Toby Sowery	BMW			16		0
-	(Macau) Kevin Tse	Mercedes-AMG	Ret		17		0
-	(Hong Kong) 'RIO' (China) David Pun	Mercedes-AMG			17		0
-	(France) Aurélien Panis (France) César Gazeau (United States) Roee Meyuhas (France) Sébastien Baud	Mercedes-AMG			18		0
-	(Bahrain) Isa Al-Khalifa (Croatia) Martin Kodric (United Kingdom) Lewis Williamson	Mercedes-AMG			19		0
-	(Australia) Jayden Ojeda	Mercedes-AMG	Ret			Ret	-
-	(Austria) Lucas Auer	Mercedes-AMG		Ret	Ret	Ret	-
-	(United Kingdom) Adam Christodoulou	Mercedes-AMG		Ret			-
-	(Germany) Fabian Schiller	Mercedes-AMG		Ret	Ret		-
-	(Netherlands) Robin Frijns	BMW		Ret			-
-	(United Kingdom) Alex Malykhin (Germany) Joel Sturm	Porsche			Ret		-
-	(Oman) Ahmad Al Harthy (United Kingdom) Sam de Haan (Australia) Calan Williams (Germany) Jens Klingmann	BMW			Ret		-
-	(Denmark) Frederik Vesti	Mercedes-AMG			Ret		-
-	(Canada) Daniel Morad	Mercedes-AMG			Ret		-
-	(Germany) Ralf Bohn (Germany) Robert Renauer (Germany) Alfred Renauer (Netherlands) Morris Schuring	Porsche			Ret		-
-	(United Kingdom) Alexander Sims (Austria) Martin Konrad	Mercedes-AMG			Ret		-
-	(France) Dorian Boccolacci	Porsche			Ret		-
-	(France) Patrick Pilet	Porsche			Ret		-
-	(China) Kerong Li (New Zealand) Earl Bamber	Porsche			Ret		-
-	(Austria) Philipp Sager (Portugal) Guilherme Moura De Oliveira (Austria) Christopher Zöchling	Porsche			Ret		-
-	(Canada) Zacharie Robichon (United States) Dustin Blattner (Germany) Dennis Marschall	Porsche			Ret		-
-	(United States) Kenton Koch (United States) Conor Daly	BMW				Ret	-
-	(Australia) Tom Sargent (United States) Kyle Washington	Porsche				Ret	-
Pos.	Driver	Manufacturer	BAT (Australia)	NÜR (Germany)	SPA (Belgium)	IND (United States)	Points

Colour	Result
Gold	Winner
Silver	Second place
Bronze	Third place
Green	Points classification
Blue	Non-points classification
Blue	Non-classified finish (NC)
Purple	Retired, not classified (Ret)
Red	Did not qualify (DNQ)
Red	Did not pre-qualify (DNPQ)
Black	Disqualified (DSQ)
White	Did not start (DNS)
White	Withdrew (WD)
White	Race cancelled (C)
Blank	Did not practice (DNP)
Blank	Did not arrive (DNA)
Blank	Excluded (EX)

**Bold** – Pole
Italics – Fastest Lap

== See also ==
- 2024 GT World Challenge America
- 2024 GT World Challenge Australia
- 2024 GT World Challenge Europe Endurance Cup
