= Eddie Cheever III =

Italian racing driver

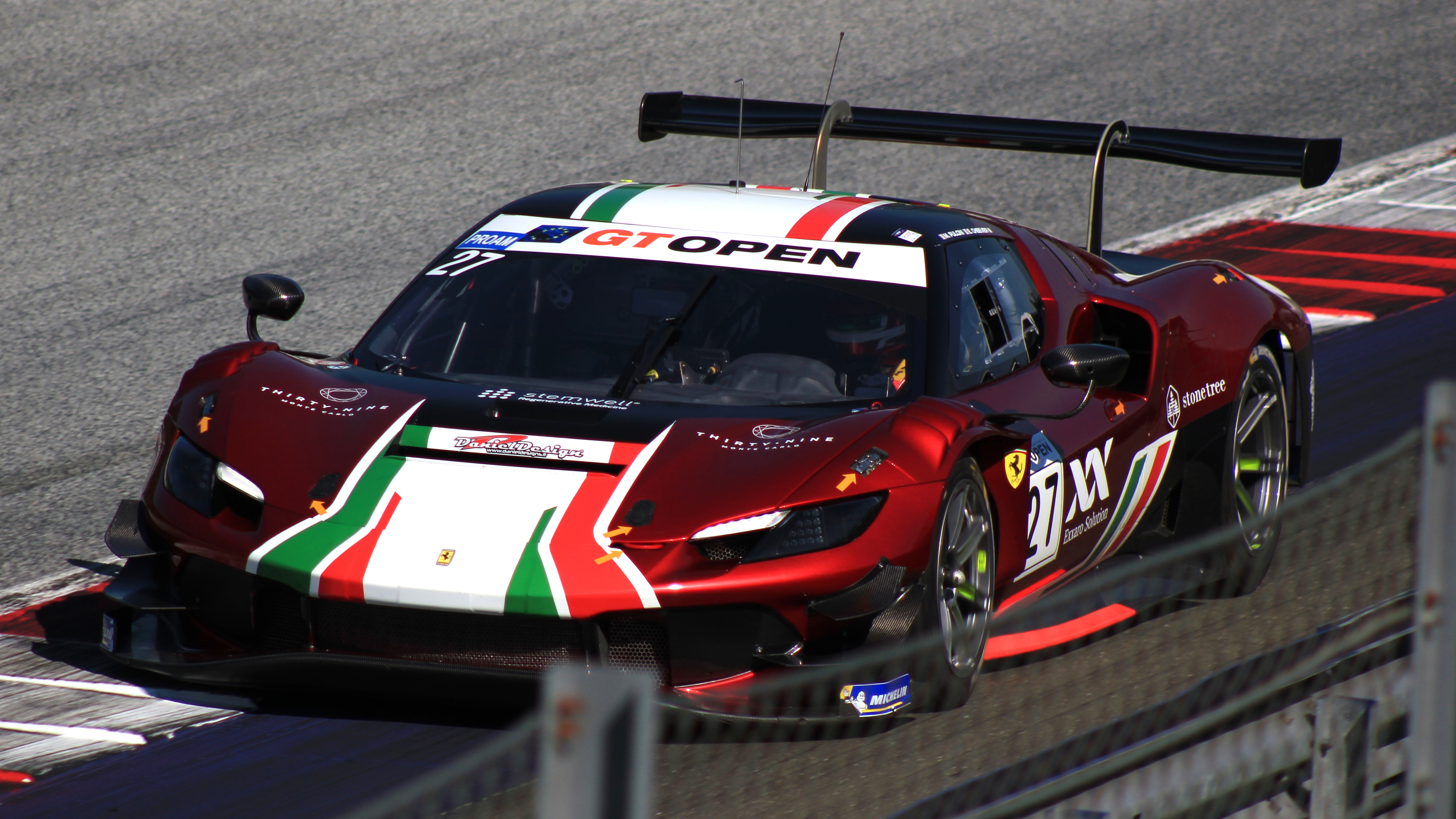
- Cheever racing at the Red Bull Ring in 2023
- Nationality: (Italy) Italian (United States) American via dual nationality
- Born: Edward McKay Cheever III; 5 June 1993 (age 33) Rome, Italy
- Relatives: Eddie Cheever (father); Ross Cheever (uncle); Richard Antinucci (cousin)

FIA World Endurance Championship career
- Debut season: 2018–19
- Current team: MR Racing
- Categorisation: FIA Silver (until 2021); FIA Gold (2022–)
- Car number: 70
- Starts: 8
- Wins: 0
- Poles: 0
- Fastest laps: 0
- Best finish: 9th in 2018–19

Previous series
- 2015 2015 2014–15 2013 2011–12 2010 2009: NASCAR K&N Pro Series West; NASCAR K&N Pro Series East; NASCAR Whelen Euro Series; FIA F3 European Championship; Italian F3; Formula Abarth; LO Formula Renault 2.0 Suisse

Championship titles
- 2023 2023 2020 2020 2016: International GT Open – Pro-Am; GT World Challenge Europe Endurance Cup – Bronze Cup; GT World Challenge Europe; GT World Challenge Europe Sprint Cup – Pro-Am; Campionato Italiano Gran Turismo – GT3

Edward McKay Cheever III (born 5 June 1993) is an Italian-American racing driver who competes in the IMSA SportsCar Championship for Triarsi Competizione in the GTD class. He is the son of retired Formula One driver and 1998 Indianapolis 500 winner Eddie Cheever.

== Career ==
=== Karting ===
Born in Rome, Cheever began karting in 2006 and raced primarily in Europe for the majority of his karting career, working his way up from the junior ranks to progress through to the KF2 category by 2009 and finishing 15th in the CIK-FIA European Championship.

=== Formula Renault ===
Cheever graduated to single-seaters in 2009. He competed with Jenzer Motorsport in the Swiss and Italian championships, finishing eleventh and fourteenth in the final standings, respectively.

=== Formula Abarth ===
In 2010, Cheever moved into the newly launched Formula Abarth series in Italy, staying with Jenzer Motorsport. He achieved a podium in the sprint race at Varano and finished the season eleventh.

=== Italian Formula Three ===
In 2011, Cheever joined Lucidi Motors for a campaign in the Italian Formula Three Championship. He finished ninth with podiums at Misano, Adria and Mugello.

Cheever remained in the series in 2012 but switched to Prema Powerteam. He finished as runner-up to Riccardo Agostini in both the European and Italian championship formats.

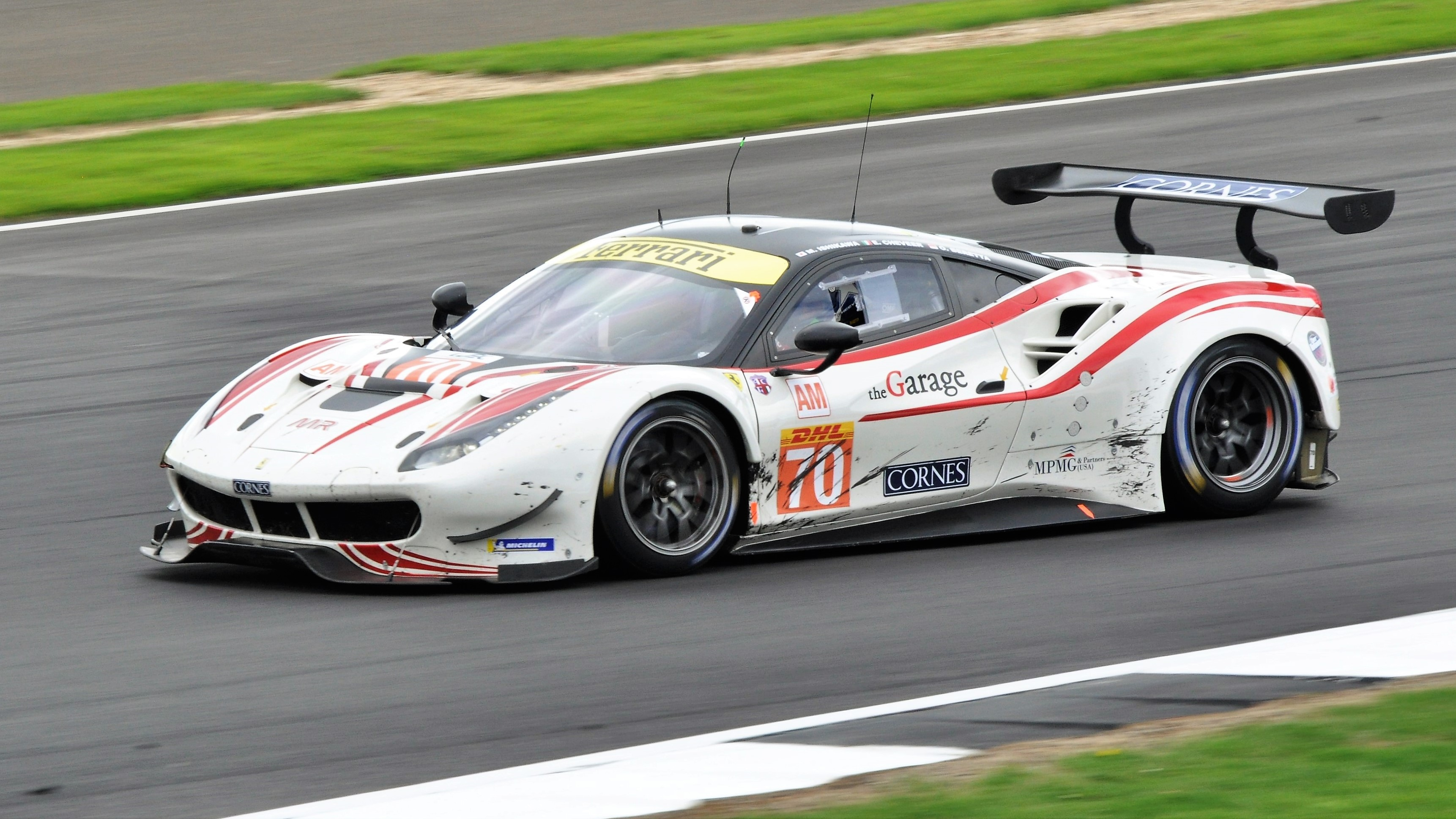
Cheever driving in the 2018 6 Hours of Silverstone.

=== Formula One ===
On 9 November 2012, Cheever tested a Scuderia Ferrari Formula One car at Vallelunga, as a result of his performance in the Italian Formula Three Championship.

=== FIA Formula 3 European Championship ===
Cheever continued his collaboration with Prema Powerteam in FIA European Formula 3 Championship in 2013.

=== NASCAR ===
In 2014, Cheever made the switch from open wheel to stock cars, running the NASCAR Whelen Euro Series for Italian-based CAAL Racing, scoring his first win and his first pole position at Brands Hatch. He then won two more races, at Magione and Le Mans, to finish the season third in points. He won the Jerome Sarran Trophy, rewarding the highest-placed driver aged 25 or under, and the Race And Win Pole Award, rewarding the driver scoring the highest number of pole positions during the season.

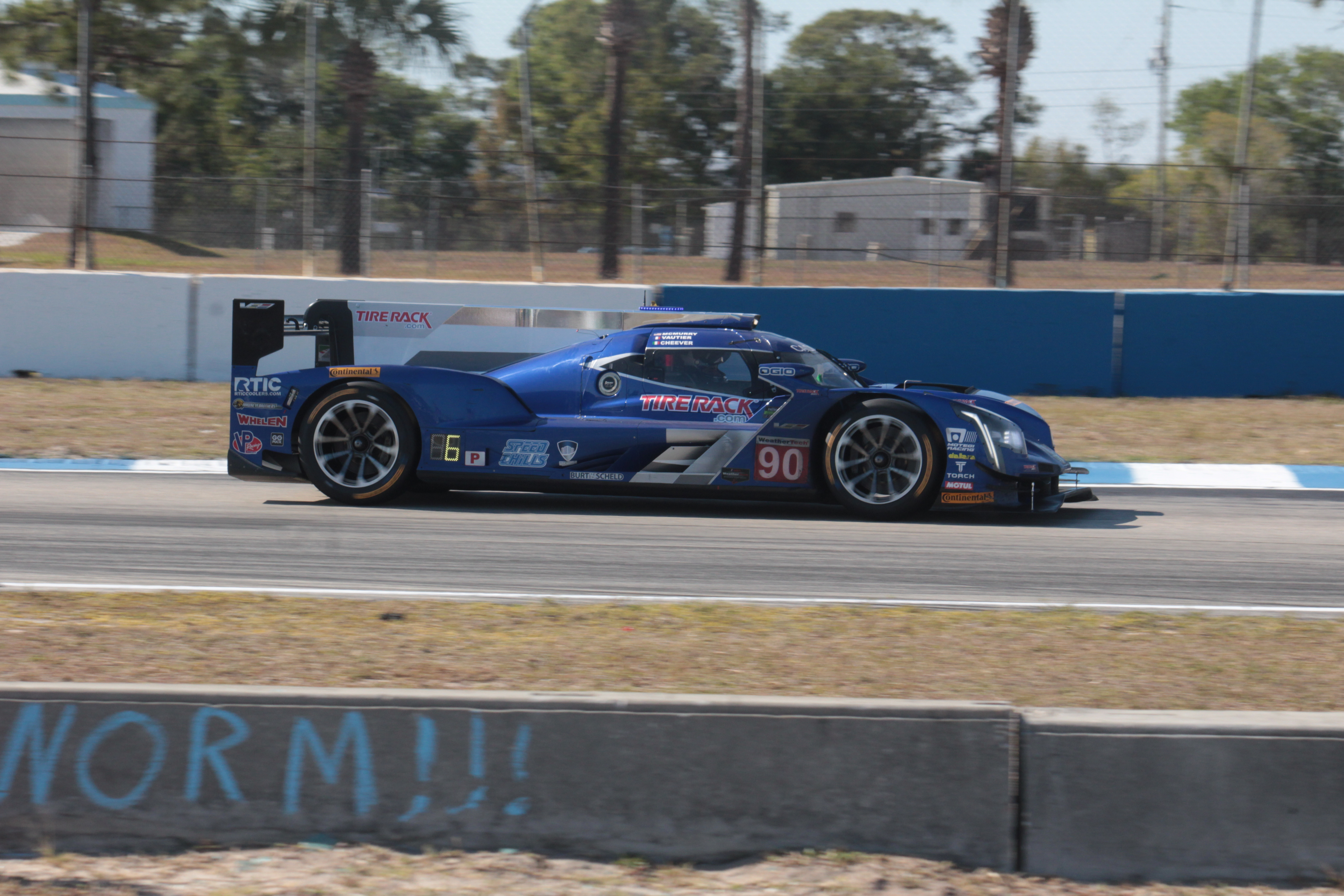
Cheever competing at the 2018 12 Hours of Sebring.

On 4 August 2015, Cheever announced that he would make his K&N Pro Series East debut at Watkins Glen International for Bill McAnally Racing. He also ran one race in K&N Pro Series West at All American Speedway, also for Bill McAnally Racing.

=== Sports car racing ===
Cheever has been a long-time member of Sky – Tempesta Racing, alongside Chris Froggatt and Jonathan Hui. In 2023, the team began partnering with Garage 59 and switched to driving the McLaren 720S GT3 in the GT World Challenge Europe.

== Racing record ==
=== Career summary ===
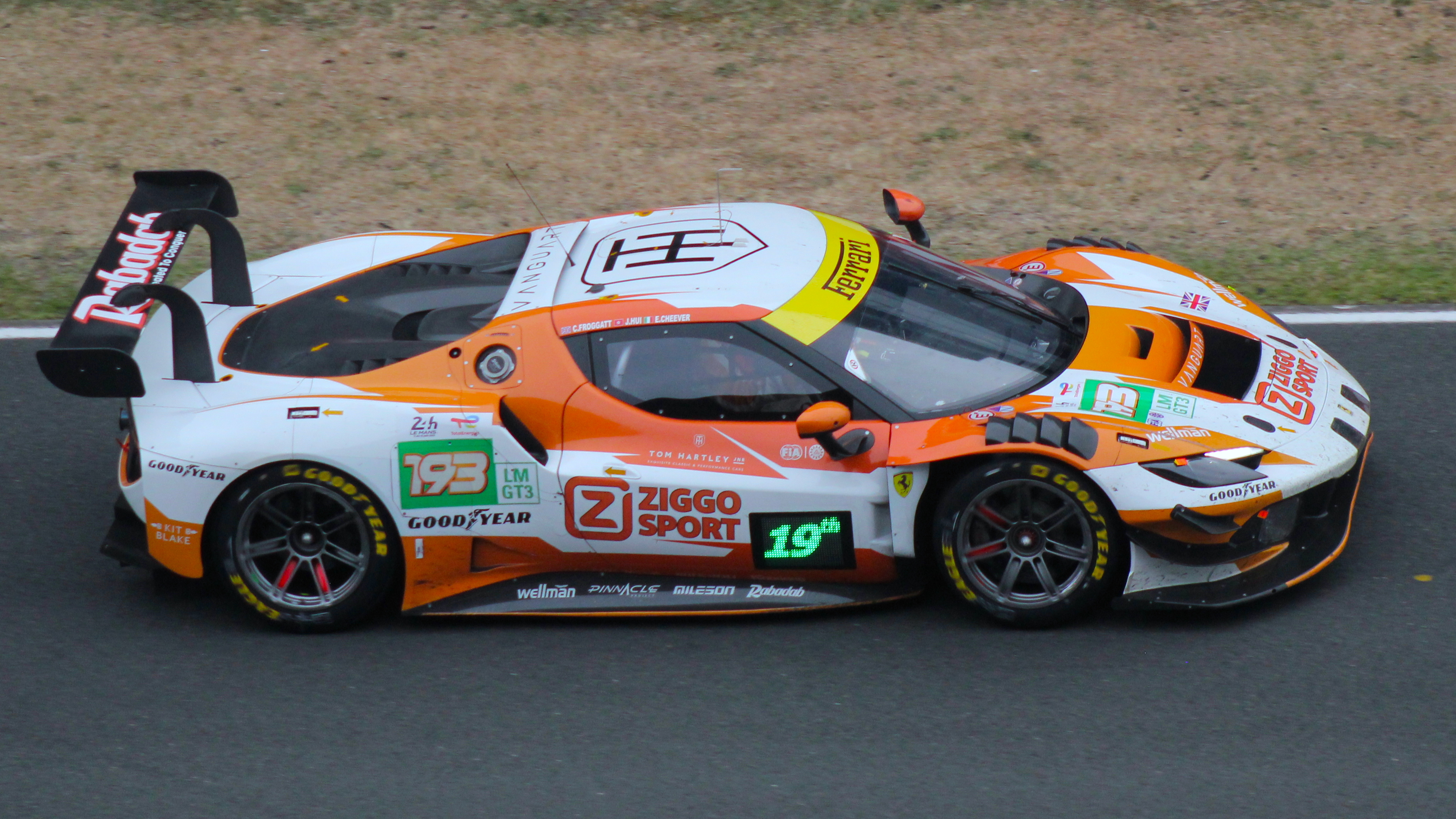
Cheever's No. 193 car at the 2025 24 Hours of Le Mans

Season	Series	Team	Races	Wins	Poles	F/Laps	Podiums	Points	Position
2009	LO Formule Renault 2.0 Suisse	Jenzer Motorsport	12	0	0	0	0	53	11th
2009	Formula Renault 2.0 Italia	Jenzer Motorsport	8	0	0	0	0	98	14th
2010	Formula Abarth	Jenzer Motorsport	14	0	0	0	1	52	10th
2011	Italian Formula 3 Championship	Lucidi Motors	16	0	0	0	3	77	9th
2012	Italian Formula 3 European Series	Prema Powerteam	24	4	8	5	12	248	**2nd**
2012	Italian Formula 3 Championship	Prema Powerteam	18	2	5	3	9	176	**2nd**
2013	FIA Formula 3 European Championship	Prema Powerteam	30	0	0	0	0	50	13th
2013	Masters of Formula 3	Prema Powerteam	1	0	0	0	0	N/A	6th
2014	NASCAR Whelen Euro Series	CAAL Racing	12	3	3	2	5	625	**3rd**
2014	EuroV8 Series	Roma Racing Team	2	2	1	2	2	45	11th
2014	United SportsCar Championship – GTD	Spirit of Race	2	0	0	0	0	14	105th
2015	NASCAR Whelen Euro Series	CAAL Racing	12	1	0	0	3	599	5th
2015	NASCAR K&N Pro Series East	Bill McAnally Racing	1	0	0	0	0	19	62nd
2015	NASCAR K&N Pro Series West	Bill McAnally Racing	1	0	0	0	0	29	57th
2016	Italian GT Championship – GT3	Scuderia Baldini 27 Network	13	3	5	4	10	156	**1st**
2017	Italian GT Championship – GT3	Scuderia Baldini 27	14	2	1	1	8	146	5th
2017	24H Series – A6	Scuderia Praha							
2018	IMSA SportsCar Championship – Prototype	Spirit of Daytona Racing	2	0	1	0	0	30	49th
2018	International GT Open	Luzich Racing	2	0	0	0	0	6	31st
2018	International GT Open – Pro-Am	Luzich Racing	2	1	1	0	2	18	11th
2018	24 Hours of Le Mans – LMGTE Am	MR Racing	1	0	0	0	0	N/A	9th
2018–19	FIA World Endurance Championship – LMGTE Am	MR Racing	8	0	0	0	0	71	9th
2019	International GT Open	Tempesta Racing	8	0	0	0	0	5	28th
2019	International GT Open – Pro-Am	Tempesta Racing	8	0	0	0	1	23	11th
2019	Blancpain GT Series Endurance Cup	Tempesta Racing	1	0	0	0	0	0	NC
2019	Blancpain GT Series Endurance Cup – Pro-Am	Tempesta Racing	1	0	0	0	0	25	15th
2019	24 Hours of Le Mans – LMGTE Am	MR Racing	1	0	0	0	0	N/A	10th
2020	GT World Challenge Europe Sprint Cup	Sky – Tempesta Racing	10	0	0	0	0	1	22nd
2020	GT World Challenge Europe Sprint Cup – Pro-Am	Sky – Tempesta Racing	10	5	5	2	8	131	**1st**
2020	GT World Challenge Europe Endurance Cup	Sky – Tempesta Racing	4	0	0	0	0	0	NC
2020	GT World Challenge Europe Endurance Cup – Pro-Am	Sky – Tempesta Racing	4	0	2	0	3	79	**2nd**
2020	Intercontinental GT Challenge	Sky – Tempesta Racing	1	0	0	0	0	0	NC
2021	GT World Challenge Europe Endurance Cup	Sky – Tempesta Racing	1	0	0	0	0	0	NC*
2021	GT World Challenge Europe Endurance Cup – Pro-Am	Sky – Tempesta Racing	1	0	0	0	0	6	7th*
2021	GT World Challenge Europe Sprint Cup	Sky – Tempesta Racing	2	0	0	0	0	0	NC
2021	GT World Challenge Europe Sprint Cup – Silver	Sky – Tempesta Racing	2	0	0	0	0	9	16th
2021	Intercontinental GT Challenge	Sky – Tempesta Racing	1	0	0	0	0	0	NC
2021	Le Mans Cup – GT3	AF Corse	1	0	0	0	0	0	15th
2022	GT World Challenge Europe Sprint Cup	Sky – Tempesta with GruppeM Racing	8	0	0	0	0	0.5	23rd
2022	GT World Challenge Europe Sprint Cup	Sky – Tempesta Racing by HRT	2	0	0	0	0	0.5	23rd
2022	GT World Challenge Europe Sprint Cup – Silver	Sky – Tempesta with GruppeM Racing	8	0	0	0	0	38.5	8th
2022	GT World Challenge Europe Sprint Cup – Silver	Sky – Tempesta Racing by HRT	2	0	0	0	0	38.5	8th
2022	GT World Challenge Europe Endurance Cup	Sky – Tempesta with GruppeM Racing	2	0	0	0	0	0	NC
2022	GT World Challenge Europe Endurance Cup	Sky – Tempesta Racing by HRT	3	0	0	0	0	0	NC
2022	GT World Challenge Europe Endurance Cup – Gold	Sky – Tempesta with GruppeM Racing	2	0	0	0	0	35	8th
2022	GT World Challenge Europe Endurance Cup – Gold	Sky – Tempesta Racing by HRT	3	0	0	0	1	35	8th
2022	IMSA SportsCar Championship – GTD Pro	Risi Competizione	1	0	1	0	0	255	31st
2023	International GT Open	AF Corse	13	0	0	1	0	31	10th
2023	International GT Open – Pro-Am	AF Corse	13	4	0	0	8	75	**1st**
2023	GT World Challenge Europe Endurance Cup	Sky – Tempesta Racing	5	0	0	0	0	0	NC
2023	GT World Challenge Europe Endurance Cup – Bronze	Sky – Tempesta Racing	5	0	0	0	4	92	**1st**
2024	GT World Challenge Europe Sprint Cup	Sky – Tempesta Racing	8	0	0	0	0	0	NC
2024	GT World Challenge Europe Sprint Cup – Bronze	Sky – Tempesta Racing	8	1	1	0	3	60.5	4th
2024	GT World Challenge Europe Endurance Cup	Sky – Tempesta Racing	5	0	0	0	0	6	25th
2024	IMSA SportsCar Championship – GTD	Cetilar Racing	1	0	0	0	0	234	59th
2024	International GT Open	AF Corse	11	0	0	0	1	31	15th
2025	IMSA SportsCar Championship – GTD	Triarsi Competizione	1	0	0	0	0	169	82nd
2025	GT2 European Series – Pro-Am	LP Racing							
2025	GT World Challenge Europe Endurance Cup	Ziggo Sport – Tempesta	5	0	0	0	0	0	NC
2025	GT World Challenge Europe Sprint Cup	Ziggo Sport – Tempesta	8	0	0	0	0	0	NC
2025	GT World Challenge Europe Sprint Cup - Bronze	Ziggo Sport – Tempesta	8	0	0	0	1	33.5	7th
2026	GT World Challenge Europe Endurance Cup	Ziggo Sport – Tempesta Racing	5	0	0	0	0	0	NC
2026	GT World Challenge Europe Sprint Cup	Ziggo Sport – Tempesta Racing	8	0	0	0	0	6	25th
2026	GT World Challenge Europe Sprint Cup - Bronze	Ziggo Sport – Tempesta Racing	8	4	3	0	6	104	**1st**

^{*} Season still in progress.

=== Complete FIA Formula 3 European Championship results ===
(key)

Year	Entrant	Engine	1	2	3	4	5	6	7	8	9	10	11	12	13	14	15	16	17	18	19	20	21	22	23	24	25	26	27	28	29	30	DC	Points
2013	Prema Powerteam	Mercedes	MNZ; 1; 10	MNZ; 2; 13	MNZ; 3; 8	SIL; 1; 19	SIL; 2; 10	SIL; 3 Ret	HOC; 1 Ret	HOC; 2; 19	HOC; 3; 9	BRH; 1; 17	BRH; 2; 11	BRH; 3 Ret	RBR; 1; 8	RBR; 2; 9	RBR; 3 Ret	NOR; 1; 11	NOR; 2; 16	NOR; 3; 14	NÜR; 1; 16	NÜR; 2; 15	NÜR; 3; 9	ZAN; 1; 13	ZAN; 2 Ret	ZAN; 3; 17	VAL; 1; 5	VAL; 2; 4	VAL; 3 Ret	HOC; 1; 9	HOC; 2; 10	HOC; 3; 17	13th	50

=== NASCAR ===
(key) (Bold – Pole position awarded by qualifying time. Italics – Pole position earned by points standings or practice time. * – Most laps led.)

==== Whelen Euro Series – Elite 1 ====
NASCAR Whelen Euro Series – Elite 1 results
Year	Team	No.	Make	1	2	3	4	5	6	7	8	9	10	11	12	NWES	Pts
2014	CAAL Racing	51	Chevrolet	VAL; 4	VAL; 6	**BRH**; 1**	BRH; 26	**TOU**; 2	TOU; 22	NÜR; 7	NÜR; 6	**UMB**; 3	UMB; 1**	LEM; 8*	LEM; 1*	3rd	625
2015	CAAL Racing	51	Chevrolet	VAL; 1*	VAL; 4	VEN; 6	VEN; 5	BRH; 4	BRH; 25	TOU; 6	TOU; 7					5th	599
2015	CAAL Racing	51	Toyota									UMB; 19	UMB; 18*	ZOL; 2	ZOL; 2	5th	599

=== Complete IMSA Sportscar Championship results ===
(key) (Races in bold indicate pole position; races in italics indicate fastest lap)

Year	Team	Class	Make	Engine	1	2	3	4	5	6	7	8	9	10	11	Rank	Points
2014	Spirit of Race	GTD	Ferrari 458 Italia GT3	Ferrari 4.5L V8	DAY	SEB	LGA; 19	DET	WGL	MOS	IMS	ELK	VIR	COA	PET; 16	105th	14
2018	Spirit of Daytona Racing	P	Cadillac DPi-V.R	Cadillac 5.5 L V8	DAY; 20	SEB; 12	LBH	MDO	DET	WGL	MOS	ELK	LGA	PET		49th	30
2022	Risi Competizione	GTD Pro	Ferrari 488 GT3 Evo 2020	Ferrari F154CB 3.9 L Turbo V8	DAY	**SEB**; 9	LBH	LGA	WGL	MOS	LIM	ELK	VIR	PET		31st	255
2024	Cetilar Racing	GTD	Ferrari 296 GT3	Ferrari F163CE 3.0 L Turbo V6	DAY; 10	SEB	LBH	LGA	WGL	MOS	ELK	VIR	IMS	PET		59th	234
2025	Triarsi Competizione	GTD	Ferrari 296 GT3	Ferrari F163CE 3.0 L Turbo V6	DAY; 15	SEB	LBH	LGA	WGL	MOS	ELK	VIR	IMS	PET		82nd	169

=== Complete FIA World Endurance Championship results ===
(key) (Races in bold indicate pole position; races in italics indicate fastest lap)

Year	Entrant	Class	Chassis	Engine	1	2	3	4	5	6	7	8	Rank	Points
2018–19	MR Racing	LMGTE Am	Ferrari 488 GTE	Ferrari F154CB 3.9 L Turbo V8	SPA; 5	LMS; 5	SIL; 7	FUJ; Ret	SHA; 6	SEB; 5	SPA; 8	LMS; 5	9th	71

=== Complete 24 Hours of Le Mans results ===
Year	Team	Co-Drivers	Car	Class	Laps	Pos.	Class Pos.
2018	(Japan) MR Racing	(Monaco) Olivier Beretta (Japan) Motoaki Ishikawa	Ferrari 488 GTE	GTE; Am	324	38th	9th
2019	(Japan) MR Racing	(Monaco) Olivier Beretta (Japan) Motoaki Ishikawa	Ferrari 488 GTE	GTE; Am	328	41st	10th
2025	(United Kingdom) Ziggo Sport – Tempesta	(United Kingdom) Chris Froggatt (Hong Kong) Jonathan Hui	Ferrari 296 GT3	LMGT3	335	46th	14th

=== Complete GT World Challenge Europe results ===
==== GT World Challenge Europe Endurance Cup ====
(Races in bold indicate pole position) (Races in italics indicate fastest lap)

Year	Team	Car	Class	1	2	3	4	5	6	7	Pos.	Points
2019	Tempesta Racing	Ferrari 488 GT3	Pro-Am	MNZ	SIL	LEC	SPA; 6H; 38	SPA; 12H; 37	SPA; 24H; 40	CAT	15th	25
2020	Sky – Tempesta Racing	Ferrari 488 GT3	Pro-Am	**IMO**; 23	NÜR; 32	SPA; 6H; 21	SPA; 12H; 19	SPA; 24H; 17	**LEC**; 24		2nd	79
2021	Sky – Tempesta Racing	Ferrari 488 GT3 Evo 2020	Pro-Am	MON; 30	LEC; 21	SPA; 6H; 27	SPA; 12H; 18	SPA; 24H; 19	NÜR	CAT	5th	69
2022	Sky – Tempesta with GruppeM Racing	Mercedes-AMG GT3 Evo	Gold	IMO; 35	LEC; Ret						8th	35
2022	Sky – Tempesta Racing by HRT	Mercedes-AMG GT3 Evo	Gold			SPA; 6H; 32	SPA; 12H; 36	SPA; 24H; 26	HOC; 32	CAT; 37	8th	35
2023	Sky – Tempesta Racing	McLaren 720S GT3 Evo	Bronze	MNZ; 17	LEC; 18	SPA; 6H; 32	SPA; 12H; 14	SPA; 24H; 18	NÜR; 23	CAT; 27	1st	92
2024	Sky – Tempesta Racing	Ferrari 296 GT3	Bronze	LEC; 25	SPA; 6H; 4	SPA; 12H; 12	SPA; 24H; 16	NÜR; 33	MNZ; 12	JED; 28	1st	74
2025	Ziggo Sport - Tempesta	Ferrari 296 GT3	Bronze	LEC; 48	MNZ; 37	SPA; 6H; 37	SPA; 12H; 25	SPA; 24H; 50†	NÜR; Ret	CAT; 39	26th	15
2026	Ziggo Sport - Tempesta Racing	Porsche 911 GT3 R (992.2)	Bronze	LEC; 49†	MNZ; 15	SPA; 6H; 20	SPA; 12H; 57†	SPA; 24H; Ret	NÜR; 31	ALG; Ret	14th	31

* Season still in progress.

==== GT World Challenge Europe Sprint Cup ====
(key) (Races in bold indicate pole position) (Races in italics indicate fastest lap)

Year	Team	Car	Class	1	2	3	4	5	6	7	8	9	10	Pos.	Points
2020	Sky – Tempesta Racing	Ferrari 488 GT3	Pro-Am	MIS; 1; 11	**MIS**; **2**; 14	MIS; 3; 11	**MAG**; **1**; 15	MAG; 2; 14	ZAN; 1; 9	ZAN; 2; 12	**CAT**; **1**; 20	**CAT**; **2**; 13	**CAT**; **3** Ret	1st	131
2021	Sky – Tempesta Racing	Ferrari 488 GT3 Evo 2020	Silver	MAG; 1	MAG; 2	ZAN; 1	ZAN; 2	MIS; 1	MIS; 2	BRH; 1	BRH; 2	VAL; 1; 15	VAL; 2; 17	16th	9
2022	Sky – Tempesta with GruppeM Racing	Mercedes-AMG GT3 Evo	Silver	BRH; 1; 17	BRH; 2; 20	MAG; 1; 19	MAG; 2; 15	ZAN; 1; 22	ZAN; 2; 17	MIS; 1; 21	MIS; 2; 14			8th	38.5
2022	Sky – Tempesta Racing by HRT	Mercedes-AMG GT3 Evo	Silver									VAL; 1; 11	VAL; 2; 10	8th	38.5
2024	Sky – Tempesta Racing	Ferrari 296 GT3	Bronze	MIS; 1; 20	**MIS**; **2**; 17	HOC; 1; 20	HOC; 2; 17	MAG; 1; 28	MAG; 2; 22	CAT; 1; 26	CAT; 2; 23			4th	60.5
2025	Ziggo Sport - Tempesta	Ferrari 296 GT3	Bronze	ZAN; 1; 30	ZAN; 2; 33	MIS; 1; 31	MIS; 2; 34	MAG; 1; 32	MAG; 2; 32	VAL; 1; 27	VAL; 2; 24			7th	33.5
2026	Ziggo Sport - Tempesta Racing	Porsche 911 GT3 R (992.2)	Bronze	MIS; 1; 35	MIS; 2; 30	MAG; 1; 18	**MAG**; **2**; 28	**ZAN**; **1**; 17	ZAN; 2; 21	CAT; 1; 5	**CAT**; **2**; 20			1st	104

Sporting positions
Preceded by Phil Keen; Hiroshi Hamaguchi (Blancpain GT World Challenge Europe)	GT World Challenge Europe Sprint Cup; Pro-Am Champion; 2020; With: Chris Froggatt	Succeeded by Henrique Chaves; Miguel Ramos
Preceded by Andrea Bertolini; Louis Machiels	GT World Challenge Europe; Pro-Am Champion; 2020; With: Chris Froggatt	Succeeded by Henrique Chaves; Miguel Ramos
Preceded by Reema Juffali; George Kurtz; Tim Müller; Valentin Pierburg	GT World Challenge Europe Endurance Cup; Bronze Champion; 2023 & 2024; With: Jonathan Hui & Chris Froggatt	Succeeded by Conrad Laursen; Dennis Marschall; Dustin Blattner
Preceded by Marcin Jedliński; Karol Basz	International GT Open; Pro-Am Champion; 2023; With: Marco Pulcini	Succeeded by Incumbent
