= 2012 Italian Formula Three Championship =

Motorsport season

Seasons
- ← 2011 none →

The 2012 Italian Formula Three Championship was the 48th and the final season Italian Formula Three Championship season. It was the first split in European and Italian series. The European Championship began on 31 March in Valencia, while the Italian Championship commenced on 9 June at Mugello. They finished together on 21 October at Monza.

== Teams and drivers ==
- All cars were powered by FPT engines, and run on Kumho tyres; all teams are Italian-registered.

Team	No.	Driver	Chassis	Status	Rounds
BVM	1	(Canada) Nicholas Latifi	Dallara F308	R	1–2
BVM	2	(Italy) Mario Marasca	Dallara F308	R	All
BVM	3	(Switzerland) Patric Niederhauser	Dallara F308	R	1–2, 5
BVM	3	(France) Maxime Jousse	Dallara F308		3–4
BVM	3	(Switzerland) Michaël Hêche	Dallara F308		7
Prema Powerteam	4	(Italy) Eddie "Edward" Cheever Jr.	Dallara F308		All
Prema Powerteam	5	(France) Brandon Maïsano	Dallara F308		All
Prema Powerteam	6	(Brazil) Henrique Martins Fulfaro	Dallara F308	R	All
Euronova Racing by Fortec	10	(Japan) Yoshitaka Kuroda	Dallara F308		All
Euronova Racing by Fortec	12	(Russia) Sergey Sirotkin	Dallara F308	R	All
Ghinzani Arco Motorsport	13	(Romania) Robert Visoiu	Dallara F308	R	1–3, 5, 7–8
Ghinzani Arco Motorsport	13	(Poland) Jakub Dalewski	Dallara F308	R	6
Ghinzani Arco Motorsport	14	(Spain) Gerard Barrabeig	Dallara F308	R	1–3
Ghinzani Arco Motorsport	14	(Italy) Kevin Giovesi	Dallara F308		4–8
JD Motorsport	18	(Canada) Nicholas Latifi	Mygale M10	R	3–8
JD Motorsport	25	(Italy) Riccardo Agostini	Mygale M10	R	All
Scuderia Victoria	33	(South Africa) Roman Shane de Beer	Mygale M10	R	3–4, 6–7

Icon	Status
R	Rookie

== Calendar ==
- An eight-round calendar was announced on 7 December 2011. The series will adopt a format used in a majority of the Formula Three series, with three races a weekend, two of which held on the Saturday and the final race on the Sunday. The Valencia and Hungaroring rounds were support races to the World Touring Car Championship.

Round		Circuit	Date	Pole position	Fastest lap	Winning driver	Winning team	Rookie winner
1	F	(Spain) Valencia Circuit	31 March	(Italy) Edward Cheever	(Italy) Edward Cheever	(Italy) Edward Cheever	Prema Powerteam	(Brazil) Henrique Martins Fulfaro
1	F	(Spain) Valencia Circuit	31 March	(Italy) Edward Cheever	(Brazil) Henrique Martins Fulfaro	(Brazil) Henrique Martins Fulfaro	Prema Powerteam	(Brazil) Henrique Martins Fulfaro
1	S	(Spain) Valencia Circuit	1 April		(Switzerland) Patric Niederhauser	(Switzerland) Patric Niederhauser	BVM	(Switzerland) Patric Niederhauser
2	F	(Hungary) Hungaroring	5 May	(Italy) Edward Cheever	(Brazil) Henrique Martins Fulfaro	(Italy) Edward Cheever	Prema Powerteam	(Italy) Riccardo Agostini
2	F	(Hungary) Hungaroring	5 May	(Italy) Riccardo Agostini	(Italy) Riccardo Agostini	(Italy) Riccardo Agostini	JD Motorsport	(Italy) Riccardo Agostini
2	S	(Hungary) Hungaroring	6 May		(Russia) Sergey Sirotkin	(Russia) Sergey Sirotkin	Euronova Racing by Fortec	(Russia) Sergey Sirotkin
3	F	(Italy) Mugello Circuit	9 June	(Italy) Edward Cheever	(France) Brandon Maïsano	(Italy) Edward Cheever	Prema Powerteam	(Italy) Riccardo Agostini
3	F	(Italy) Mugello Circuit	9 June	(Italy) Edward Cheever	(France) Brandon Maïsano	(France) Brandon Maïsano	Prema Powerteam	(Italy) Riccardo Agostini
3	S	(Italy) Mugello Circuit	10 June		(Italy) Mario Marasca	(Romania) Robert Visoiu	Ghinzani Arco Motorsport	(Romania) Robert Visoiu
4	F	(Italy) Misano World Circuit	7 July	(France) Brandon Maïsano	(Italy) Edward Cheever	(France) Brandon Maïsano	Prema Powerteam	(Italy) Riccardo Agostini
4	F	(Italy) Misano World Circuit	8 July	(France) Brandon Maïsano	(Italy) Edward Cheever	(France) Brandon Maïsano	Prema Powerteam	(Italy) Riccardo Agostini
4	S	(Italy) Misano World Circuit	8 July		(Italy) Edward Cheever	(Italy) Riccardo Agostini	JD Motorsport	(Italy) Riccardo Agostini
5	F	(Austria) Red Bull Ring	4 August	(Italy) Riccardo Agostini	(Italy) Riccardo Agostini	(Italy) Riccardo Agostini	JD Motorsport	(Italy) Riccardo Agostini
5	S	(Austria) Red Bull Ring	5 August		(Brazil) Henrique Martins Fulfaro	(Brazil) Henrique Martins Fulfaro	Prema Powerteam	(Brazil) Henrique Martins Fulfaro
5	F	(Austria) Red Bull Ring	5 August	(Italy) Riccardo Agostini	(Italy) Riccardo Agostini	(Italy) Riccardo Agostini	JD Motorsport	(Italy) Riccardo Agostini
6	F	(Italy) Autodromo Enzo e Dino Ferrari, Imola	1 September	(Italy) Edward Cheever	(France) Brandon Maïsano	(Brazil) Henrique Martins Fulfaro	Prema Powerteam	(Brazil) Henrique Martins Fulfaro
6	F	(Italy) Autodromo Enzo e Dino Ferrari, Imola	2 September	(Italy) Riccardo Agostini	(Italy) Riccardo Agostini	(Italy) Kevin Giovesi	Ghinzani Arco Motorsport	(Italy) Riccardo Agostini
6	S	(Italy) Autodromo Enzo e Dino Ferrari, Imola	2 September		(Italy) Riccardo Agostini	(Italy) Kevin Giovesi	Ghinzani Arco Motorsport	(Canada) Nicholas Latifi
7	F	(Italy) ACI Vallelunga Circuit	15 September	(Italy) Riccardo Agostini	(Italy) Riccardo Agostini	(Italy) Riccardo Agostini	JD Motorsport	(Italy) Riccardo Agostini
7	F	(Italy) ACI Vallelunga Circuit	16 September	(Italy) Riccardo Agostini	(Italy) Edward Cheever	(Italy) Kevin Giovesi	Ghinzani Arco Motorsport	(Italy) Riccardo Agostini
7	S	(Italy) ACI Vallelunga Circuit	16 September		(Italy) Riccardo Agostini	(Canada) Nicholas Latifi	JD Motorsport	(Canada) Nicholas Latifi
8	F	(Italy) Autodromo Nazionale Monza	20 October	(Italy) Edward Cheever	(Italy) Riccardo Agostini	(Italy) Edward Cheever	Prema Powerteam	(Italy) Riccardo Agostini
8	F	(Italy) Autodromo Nazionale Monza	21 October	(Italy) Edward Cheever	(Italy) Riccardo Agostini	(Russia) Sergey Sirotkin	Euronova Racing by Fortec	(Russia) Sergey Sirotkin
8	S	(Italy) Autodromo Nazionale Monza	21 October		(Italy) Riccardo Agostini	(Italy) Riccardo Agostini	JD Motorsport	(Italy) Riccardo Agostini

European Series
Both championships

== Championship standings ==
- Points were awarded as follows:

	1	2	3	4	5	6	7	8	9	10	PP	FL
Feature races	20	15	12	10	8	5	4	3	2	1	**1**	1
Sprint	13	11	9	7	6	5	4	3	2	1		1

=== European Series ===
==== Drivers' standings ====
Pos	Driver	VRT (Spain)			HUN (Hungary)			MUG (Italy)			MIS (Italy)			RBR (Austria)			IMO (Italy)			VLL (Italy)			MNZ (Italy)			Pts
1	(Italy) Riccardo Agostini	7	4	8	2	**1**	8	3	3	3	3	3	1	**1**	4	**1**	DSQ	**2**	4	**1**	**3**	2	2	4	1	281
2	(Italy) Edward Cheever	**1**	**3**	6	**1**	4	10	**1**	**2**	6	2	2	2	2	Ret	3	**Ret**	4	5	3	5	7	**1**	**DSQ**	DSQ	248
3	(France) Brandon Maïsano	3	2	4	Ret	3	5	2	1	10	**1**	**1**	3	3	2	2	8	3	10	2	2	Ret	7	DSQ	DSQ	229
4	(Brazil) Henrique Martins Fulfaro	2	1	5	9	2	7	7	11	5	11	7	6	4	1	5	1	5	9	5	4	Ret	4	6	DSQ	180
5	(Russia) Sergey Sirotkin	4	6	2	6	6	1	4	8	2	4	5	10	8	5	6	3	7	3	Ret	7	8	5	1	DSQ	166
6	(Italy) Kevin Giovesi										6	4	11	5	3	4	2	1	1	4	1	Ret	DNS	7	DSQ	121
7	(Canada) Nicholas Latifi	9	10	Ret	7	9	4	8	12	Ret	10	8	5	7	7	7	4	6	2	6	Ret	1	8	3	2	117
8	(Italy) Mario Marasca	8	8	10	4	8	6	5	4	11	8	11	7	Ret	9	10	Ret	8	7	8	6	3	3	2	DSQ	109
9	(Romania) Robert Visoiu	11	7	7	3	5	3	6	6	1				Ret	7	Ret				7	8	6	Ret	Ret	DSQ	76
10	(Japan) Yoshitaka Kuroda	10	9	9	8	10	11	11	10	9	9	10	9	9	10	8	7	9	8	Ret	9	5	6	5	DSQ	62
11	(Switzerland) Patric Niederhauser	6	11	1	5	Ret	2							6	8	9										48
12	(Spain) Gerard Barrabeig	5	5	3	Ret	7	9	Ret	6	7																40
13	(France) Maxime Jousse							9	5	4	5	6	4													37
14	(Switzerland) Michaël Hêche																			9	Ret	4				9
15	(Poland) Jakub Dalewski																6	Ret	Ret							8
Ineligible drivers
	(South Africa) Roman Shane de Beer							10	9	8	7	9	8				5	Ret	6	WD	WD	WD				0
Pos	Driver	VRT (Spain)			HUN (Hungary)			MUG (Italy)			MIS (Italy)			RBR (Austria)			IMO (Italy)			VLL (Italy)			MNZ (Italy)			Pts

Colour	Result
Gold	Winner
Silver	Second place
Bronze	Third place
Green	Points classification
Blue	Non-points classification
Blue	Non-classified finish (NC)
Purple	Retired, not classified (Ret)
Red	Did not qualify (DNQ)
Red	Did not pre-qualify (DNPQ)
Black	Disqualified (DSQ)
White	Did not start (DNS)
White	Withdrew (WD)
White	Race cancelled (C)
Blank	Did not practice (DNP)
Blank	Did not arrive (DNA)
Blank	Excluded (EX)

**Bold** – Pole
Italics – Fastest Lap

==== Rookies' standings ====
Pos	Driver	VRT (Spain)			HUN (Hungary)			MUG (Italy)			MIS (Italy)			RBR (Austria)			IMO (Italy)			VAL (Italy)			MNZ (Italy)			Pts
1	(Italy) Riccardo Agostini	7	4	8	2	**1**	8	3	3	3	3	3	1	**1**	4	**1**	DSQ	**2**	4	**1**	**3**	2	2	4	1	348
2	(Brazil) Henrique Martins Fulfaro	2	1	5	9	2	7	7	11	5	11	7	6	4	1	5	1	5	9	5	4	Ret	4	6	DSQ	263
3	(Russia) Sergey Sirotkin	4	6	2	6	6	1	4	8	2	4	5	10	8	5	6	3	7	3	Ret	7	8	5	1	DSQ	240
4	(Italy) Mario Marasca	8	8	10	4	8	6	5	4	11	8	11	7	Ret	9	10	Ret	8	7	8	6	3	3	2	DSQ	177
5	(Canada) Nicholas Latifi	9	10	Ret	7	9	4	8	12	Ret	10	8	5	7	7	7	4	6	2	6	Ret	1	8	3	2	170
6	(Romania) Robert Visoiu	11	7	7	3	5	3	6	7	1				Ret	6	Ret				7	8	6	Ret	Ret	DSQ	116
7	(Switzerland) Patric Niederhauser	6	11	1	5	Ret	2							6	8	9										71
8	(Spain) Gerard Barrabeig	5	5	3	Ret	7	9	Ret	6	7																62
Pos	Driver	VRT (Spain)			HUN (Hungary)			MUG (Italy)			MIS (Italy)			RBR (Austria)			IMO (Italy)			VAL (Italy)			MNZ (Italy)			Pts

==== Teams' standings ====
Pos	Team	VRT (Spain)			HUN (Hungary)			MUG (Italy)			MIS (Italy)			RBR (Austria)			IMO (Italy)			VAL (Italy)			MNZ (Italy)			Pts
1	Prema Powerteam	**1**	1	4	**1**	2	5	**1**	1	5	**1**	**1**	2	2	1	2	1	3	5	2	2	7	**1**	6	DSQ	336
2	JD Motorsport	7	4	8	2	**1**	8	3	3	3	3	3	1	**1**	4	**1**	4	**2**	2	**1**	**3**	1	2	3	1	296
3	Ghinzani Arco Motorsport	5	5	3	3	5	3	6	6	1	6	4	11	5	3	4	2	1	1	4	1	6	Ret	7	DSQ	207
4	Euronova Racing by Fortec	4	6	2	6	6	1	4	8	2	4	5	9	8	5	6	3	7	3	Ret	7	5	5	1	DSQ	172
5	BVM	6	8	1	4	8	2	5	4	4	5	6	4	6	8	10	Ret	8	7	8	6	3	3	2	DSQ	153
Ineligible teams
	Scuderia Victoria							10	9	8	7	9	8				5	Ret	6	WD	WD	WD				0
Pos	Driver	VRT (Spain)			HUN (Hungary)			MUG (Italy)			MIS (Italy)			RBR (Austria)			IMO (Italy)			VAL (Italy)			MNZ (Italy)			Pts

=== Italian Series ===
==== Drivers' standings ====
Pos	Driver	MUG (Italy)			MIS (Italy)			RBR (Austria)			IMO (Italy)			VAL (Italy)			MNZ (Italy)			Pts
1	(Italy) Riccardo Agostini	3	3	3	3	3	1	**1**	4	**1**	DSQ	**2**	4	**1**	**3**	2	2	4	1	209
2	(Italy) Edward Cheever	**1**	**2**	6	2	2	2	2	Ret	3	**Ret**	4	5	3	5	7	**1**	**DSQ**	DSQ	176
3	(France) Brandon Maïsano	2	1	10	**1**	**1**	3	3	2	2	8	3	10	2	2	Ret	7	DSQ	DSQ	174
4	(Italy) Kevin Giovesi				6	4	11	5	3	4	2	1	1	4	1	Ret	DNS	7	DSQ	124
5	(Russia) Sergey Sirotkin	4	8	2	4	5	10	8	5	6	3	7	3	Ret	7	8	5	1	DSQ	116
6	(Brazil) Henrique Martins Fulfaro	7	11	5	11	7	6	4	1	5	1	5	9	5	4	Ret	4	6	DSQ	115
7	(Canada) Nicholas Latifi	8	12	Ret	10	8	5	7	7	7	4	6	2	6	Ret	1	8	3	2	97
8	(Italy) Mario Marasca	5	4	11	8	11	7	Ret	9	10	Ret	8	7	8	6	3	3	2	DSQ	77
9	(Japan) Yoshitaka Kuroda	11	10	9	9	10	9	9	10	8	7	9	8	Ret	9	5	6	5	DSQ	45
10	(Romania) Robert Visoiu	6	7	1				Ret	6	Ret				7	8	6	Ret	Ret	DSQ	39
11	(France) Maxime Jousse	9	5	4	5	6	4													37
12	(South Africa) Roman Shane de Beer	10	9	8	7	9	8				5	Ret	6	WD	WD	WD				28
13	(Switzerland) Patric Niederhauser							6	8	9										10
14	(Switzerland) Michaël Hêche													9	Ret	4				9
15	(Spain) Gerard Barrabeig	Ret	6	7																9
16	(Poland) Jakub Dalewski										6	Ret	Ret							5
Pos	Driver	MUG (Italy)			MIS (Italy)			RBR (Austria)			IMO (Italy)			VAL (Italy)			MNZ (Italy)			Pts

Colour	Result
Gold	Winner
Silver	Second place
Bronze	Third place
Green	Points classification
Blue	Non-points classification
Blue	Non-classified finish (NC)
Purple	Retired, not classified (Ret)
Red	Did not qualify (DNQ)
Red	Did not pre-qualify (DNPQ)
Black	Disqualified (DSQ)
White	Did not start (DNS)
White	Withdrew (WD)
White	Race cancelled (C)
Blank	Did not practice (DNP)
Blank	Did not arrive (DNA)
Blank	Excluded (EX)

**Bold** – Pole
Italics – Fastest Lap

==== Teams' standings ====
Pos	Team	MUG (Italy)			MIS (Italy)			RBR (Austria)			IMO (Italy)			VAL (Italy)			MNZ (Italy)			Pts
1	Prema Powerteam	**1**	1	5	**1**	**1**	2	2	1	2	1	3	5	2	2	7	**1**	6	DSQ	244
2	JD Motorsport	3	3	3	3	3	1	**1**	4	**1**	4	**2**	2	**1**	**3**	1	2	3	1	239
3	Ghinzani Arco Motorsport	6	6	1	6	4	11	5	3	4	2	1	1	4	1	6	Ret	7	DSQ	152
4	Euronova Racing by Fortec	4	8	2	4	5	9	8	5	6	3	7	3	Ret	7	5	5	1	DSQ	121
5	BVM	5	4	4	5	6	4	6	8	9	Ret	8	7	8	6	3	3	2	DSQ	113
6	Scuderia Victoria	10	9	8	7	9	8				5	Ret	6	WD	WD	WD				27
Pos	Driver	MUG (Italy)			MIS (Italy)			RBR (Austria)			IMO (Italy)			VAL (Italy)			MNZ (Italy)			Pts
