= Patric Niederhauser =

Swiss racecar driver (born 1991)

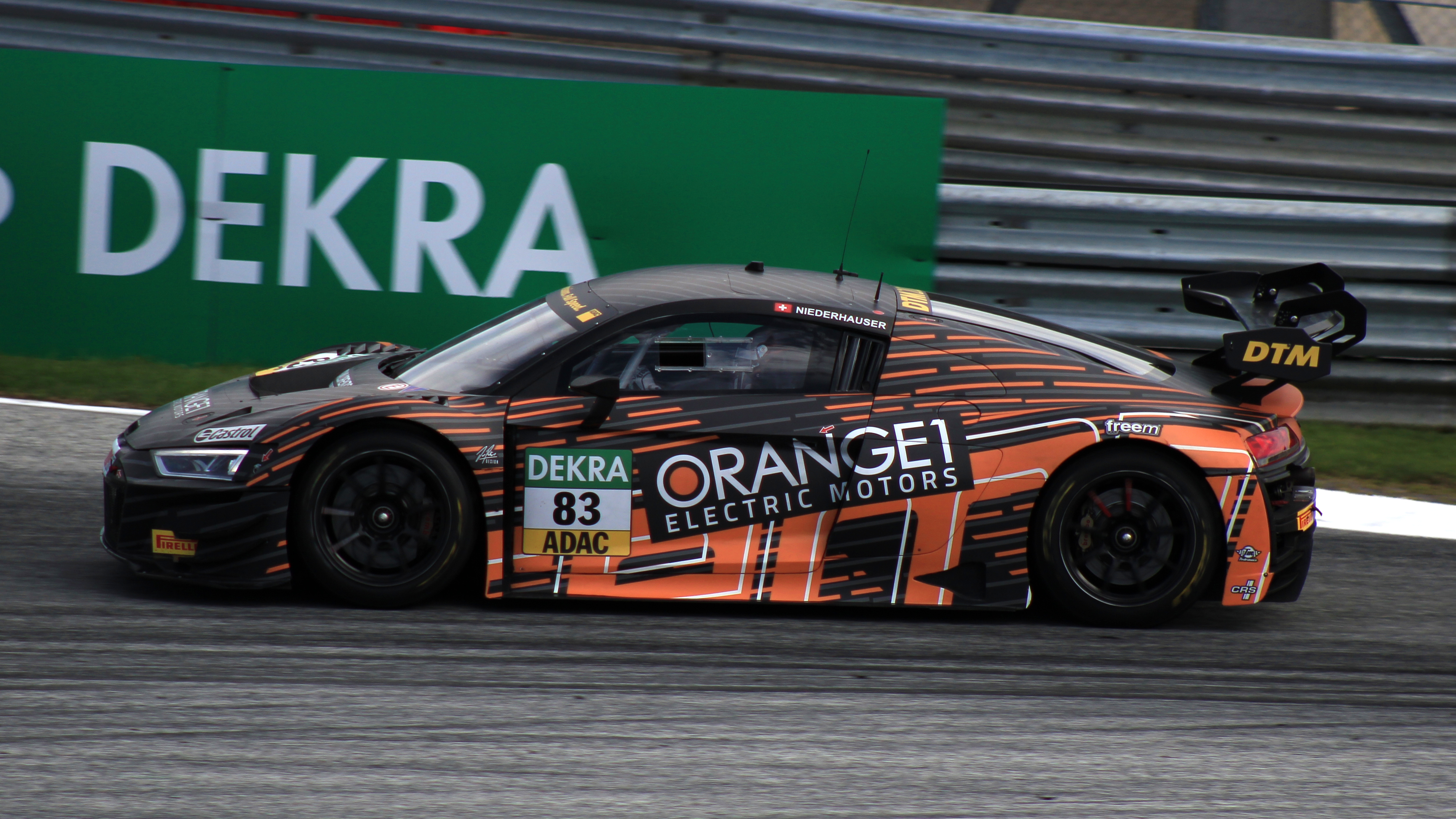
- Niederhauser racing at the Red Bull Ring in the DTM
- Nationality: (Switzerland) Swiss
- Born: 8 October 1991 (age 35) Münsingen, Switzerland

GP3 Series career
- Debut season: 2012
- Current team: Jenzer Motorsport
- Categorisation: FIA Gold (until 2022); FIA Platinum (2023–)
- Car number: 11
- Starts: 50
- Wins: 5
- Poles: 0
- Fastest laps: 4
- Best finish: 7th in 2012

Previous series
- 2012 2010-11 2010: Italian Formula Three; Formula Abarth; Formula Renault 2.0 MEC

Championship titles
- 2025 2019 2011: GT World Challenge Europe Endurance Cup; ADAC GT Masters; Formula Abarth Italian Series

Patric Niederhauser (born 8 October 1991) is a professional racing driver from Switzerland and a current Lamborghini factory driver.

Niederhauser was the champion of the Formula Abarth Italian Series in 2011 and competed in the GP3 Series before switching into GT racing, where a 2019 title in the ADAC GT Masters earned him a spot in the Audi factory lineup. After four years in the programme, Niederhauser switched to Porsche ahead of 2024, where he would secure the 2025 GT World Challenge Europe Endurance Cup championship. He would then move to Lamborghini for the 2026 season and onwards.

== Early career ==
=== Karting ===
Niederhauser began karting in 2006 and raced primarily in his native Switzerland for the majority of his career, working his way up from the junior ranks to progress through to the KF2 category by 2009, when he finished as runner-up in Swiss Karting Championship.

=== Lower formulae ===
In 2010, Niederhauser graduated to single–seaters, racing in the newly launched Formula Abarth series in Italy for Jenzer Motorsport. Race victory at Varano and another five podiums at the end of the season saw him finish as runner-up in the Italian series, Niederhauser remained in Formula Abarth for a second season in 2011, when the series split into the European and Italian series. He won the Italian Series title in clash with teammate (till Spa round) Sergey Sirotkin, taking six wins in fourteen races. In the European Series the Swiss driver finished as runner-up with five race victories, 37 points behind Sirotkin.

During 2010, Niederhauser also contested a single round of the Formula Renault 2.0 Middle European Championship at Dijon, finishing on the podium in both races.

=== GP3 Series ===
In 2012, Niederhauser remained with Jenzer, moving into the GP3 Series. In his debut season, two wins helped the Swiss driver towards seventh in the standings. The following year, he returned to GP3 with Jenzer. The campaign proved to be less successful, as Niederhauser only scored two points finishes following a double podium at the opening round, thus ending up 13th in the standings.

In what would prove to be Niederhauser's final year in GP3, 2014 saw him switching over to Arden International. At the Hungaroring, Niederhauser broke his two-year long winless streak during the sprint race, and won again at Sochi to finish tenth overall.

Niederhauser did not attain a seat in 2015, only competing in one round of the GP2 Series for Daiko Team Lazarus.

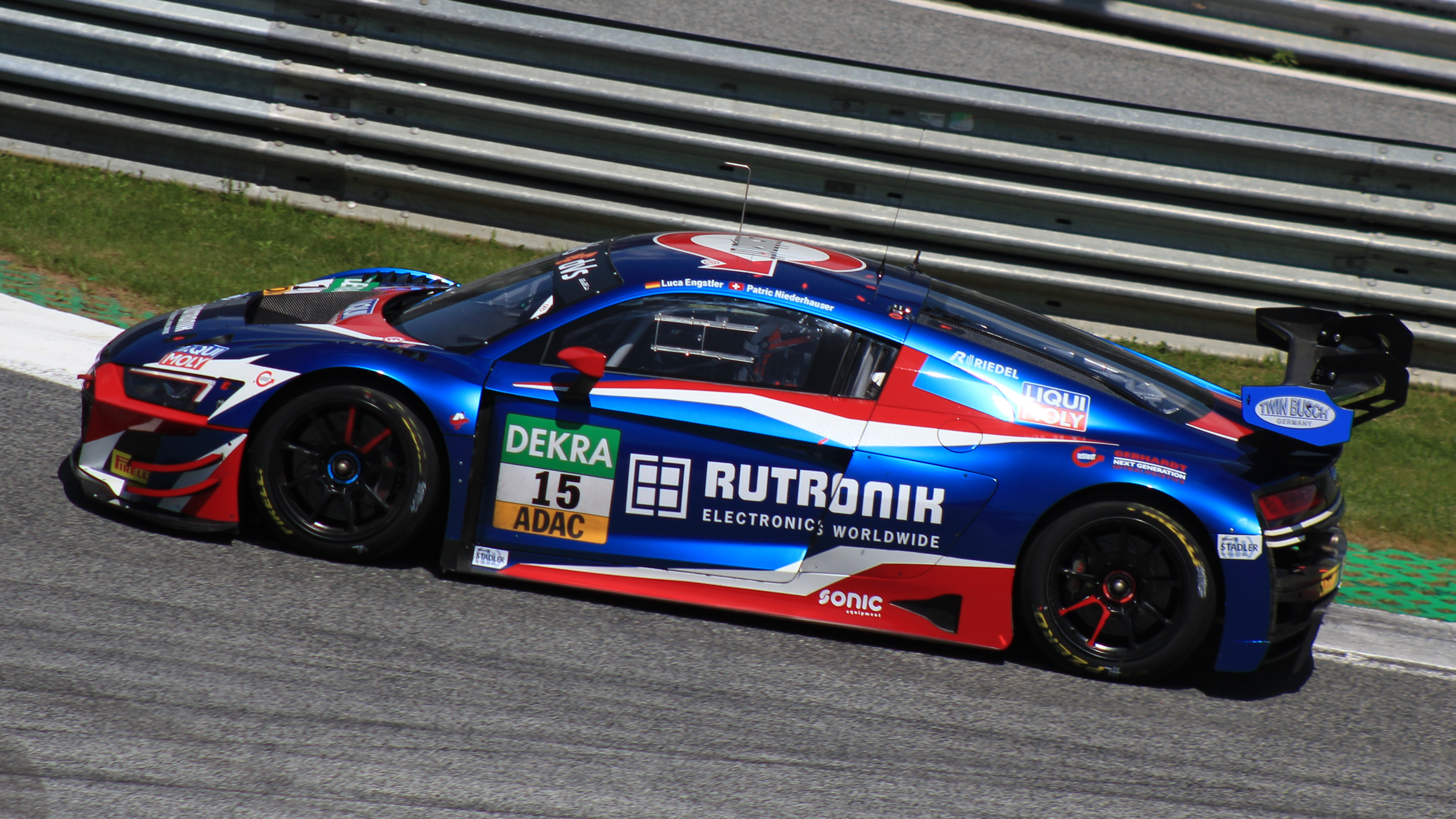
Niederhauser competing at the Red Bull Ring during the 2022 ADAC GT Masters season.

== Sportscar career ==
In 2016, Niederhauser made his sportscar debut, driving for Attempto Racing in the opening three rounds of the ADAC GT Masters. He would also race for the team in the Blancpain GT Series Endurance Cup and GT Series Sprint Cup championships that year, collecting a best race finish of tenth in both series.

For the following season, Niederhauser returned to GT Masters, this time partnering youngster Dennis Marschall at Aust Motorsport. The pair scored regular points finishes in the second half of the season, though that would only be enough for 21st in the drivers' championship. Niederhauser split his attention between Europe and Asia in 2018, competing for GruppeM Racing Team in the Blancpain GT Series Asia, where his first three wins in GT3 competition helped him towards third place in the standings, and the Silver Cup class of the Blancpain Endurance Cup, where he scored a single class podium.

Niederhauser came back to GT Masters for the 2019 season, racing for HCB-Rutronik Racing alongside Audi factory driver Kelvin van der Linde. With three victories and four further podiums, the Swiss-South African duo managed to take the title in dominant fashion. As a result of his performances, Niederhauser was introduced to Audi's factory driver lineup in 2020. That year saw him and van der Linde drive for Rutronik once again in defence of his GT Masters title, though they lost out due to a retirement in the final race caused by a startline collision, finishing fourth overall with a single win.

For the 2021 GT Masters season, Niederhauser moved to Phoenix Racing to partner second-year GT3 driver Jusuf Owega. The pair struggled to take results and failed to finish on the podium, which resulted in 18th place at year's end. Niederhauser returned to Rutronik in 2022, once again being joined by an inexperienced GT driver in Luca Engstler. A 14th place in the standings was the result, with the pair scoring a lone podium from a Niederhauser pole at Oschersleben. During the same year, the Swiss driver drove for Saintéloc Racing in both the GT World Challenge Europe Endurance and Sprint Cups. In the former, he would score a surprise victory at the Hockenheimring, meanwhile two podiums in the latter would signify sixth overall for him and Aurélien Panis.

Niederhauser remained at Saintéloc for the 2023 GT World Challenge Europe season, joining fellow factory drivers Simon Gachet and Christopher Mies for a Pro entry in the Endurance Cup, and partnering GT3 rookie Erwan Bastard in the Sprint Cup. Despite not scoring a single podium in the former, Niederhauser and his teammates ended up sixth in the standings owing to three fourth-place finishes. Meanwhile, a lone podium in the Sprint Cup resulted in tenth overall for the Swiss driver in the Sprint Cup. During the same year, Niederhauser also competed in the DTM with Tresor Orange1 fielded by Attempto Racing, though the team's struggles to settle into the series due to a low number of test days resulted in 23rd place in the championship.

With the disbandment of Audi's works lineup, Niederhauser found a new home at Porsche for 2024. He would compete with the marque in both the Sprint and Endurance Cups, partnering Sven Müller in the former and being joined by Julien Andlauer in the latter on his second return to Rutronik. In the Endurance Cup, the trio would finish 17th overall, with two points finishes and a best result of 5th at the season opener at Circuit Paul Ricard. In the Sprint Cup, duo of Niederhauser and Müller would win the season finale in Barcelona, finishing fifth in the championship. Niederhauser would find victory at that year's edition of the 24 Hours of Nürburgring in the SP 9 Pro-Am class with Lionspeed GP.

2025 would see Niederhauser remain at Rutronik for both the Sprint Cup and Endurance Cup alongside Sven Müller, with Alessio Picariello joining for endurance rounds. Niederhauser would win the Endurance Cup championship with the aforementioned despite not scoring any wins across the season, and also secured the first drivers and teams title in the series for Porsche. He would also finish second overall at the 24 Hours of Spa with Müller and Picariello. Following a win at the first round in Zandvoort, Niederhauser would the finish the Sprint Cup championship in fifth overall.

Rutronik would move to Lamborghini before the start of the 2026 season, with Niederhauser being named a Lamborghini factory driver. He would remain with the team, who will attempt to defend their team and drivers' titles with Marco Mapelli and Luca Engstler.

== Personal life ==
Niederhauser is in a relationship with racing driver Marylin Niederhauser who competed in the ADAC Formula 4 Championship. The fact that the two have identical surnames is a coincidence.

== Racing record ==
=== Career summary ===
Season	Series	Team	Races	Wins	Poles	F/Laps	Podiums	Points	Position
2010	Formula Abarth	Jenzer Motorsport	14	1	1	1	6	106	**2nd**
2010	Formula Renault 2.0 MEC	Jenzer Motorsport	2	0	0	0	2	N/A	NC†
2011	Formula Abarth Italian Series	Jenzer Motorsport	14	6	2	6	8	149	**1st**
2011	Formula Abarth European Series	Jenzer Motorsport	14	5	1	6	9	138	**2nd**
2012	GP3 Series	Jenzer Motorsport	16	2	0	1	4	101	7th
2012	Italian Formula 3 European Series	BVM	9	1	0	1	2	48	11th
2012	Italian Formula 3 Italian Series	BVM	3	0	0	0	0	10	13th
2013	GP3 Series	Jenzer Motorsport	16	0	0	0	2	33	13th
2013	European Le Mans Series - LMP2	Race Performance	4	0	0	0	1	40	9th
2013	24 Hours of Le Mans - LMP2	Race Performance	1	0	0	0	0	N/A	9th
2014	GP3 Series	Arden International	18	2	0	2	2	62	10th
2014	European Le Mans Series - LMP2	Race Performance	1	0	0	0	0	12	20th
2015	GP2 Series	Daiko Team Lazarus	2	0	0	0	0	0	34th
2016	ADAC GT Masters	ADAC NSA / Attempto Racing	6	0	0	0	0	0	NC
2016	Blancpain GT Series Sprint Cup	Attempto Racing	7	0	0	0	0	1	31st
2016	Blancpain GT Series Endurance Cup	Attempto Racing	5	0	0	0	0	2	46th
2017	ADAC GT Masters	Aust Motorsport	14	0	0	1	0	34	21st
2018	Blancpain GT Series Asia	GruppeM Racing Team	12	3	2	1	4	123	**3rd**
2018	Blancpain GT Series Asia - Silver	GruppeM Racing Team	12	3	2	1	6	142	4th
2018	Blancpain GT Series Endurance Cup	Reiter Young Stars	4	0	0	0	0	0	NC
2018	Blancpain GT Series Endurance Cup - Silver	Reiter Young Stars	4	0	0	0	1	36	11th
2018	GT4 Central European Cup - Pro-Am	K Racing – Reiter	2	1	1	1	2	50	11th
2019	ADAC GT Masters	HCB-Rutronik Racing	14	3	3	1	7	205	**1st**
2019	GT4 European Series - Silver	True Racing	12	1	0	2	4	121	5th
2019	Blancpain GT World Challenge Asia	Solite Indigo Racing	2	0	0	0	0	8	35th
2019	Blancpain GT World Challenge Asia - Silver	Solite Indigo Racing	2	0	0	0	0	18	17th
2019	FIA Motorsport Games GT Cup	Team Switzerland	1	0	0	0	0	N/A	17th
2020	ADAC GT Masters	Rutronik Racing	13	1	0	1	4	160	4th
2020	International GT Open	Reiter Engineering	2	0	0	0	0	0	NC†
2020	GT World Challenge Europe Endurance Cup	Audi Sport Team Attempto Racing	1	0	0	0	1	23	14th
2020	Intercontinental GT Challenge	Audi Sport Team Attempto Racing	1	0	0	0	1	28	8th
2020	Intercontinental GT Challenge	Audi Sport Team Car Collection	1	0	0	0	0	28	8th
2020	24 Hours of Nürburgring - SP9	Car Collection Motorsport	1	0	0	0	0	N/A	15th
2021	ADAC GT Masters	Phoenix Racing	13	0	0	0	0	54	18th
2021	GT World Challenge Europe Endurance Cup	Audi Sport Team Saintéloc Racing	1	0	0	0	0	8	24th
2021	Intercontinental GT Challenge	Audi Sport Team Saintéloc Racing	3	1	0	0	2	50	**2nd**
2021	24H GT Series - GT4	Lionspeed by Car Collection Motorsport	1	0	0	0	0	0	NC
2021	24 Hours of Nürburgring - SP9	Lionspeed by Car Collection Motorsport	1	0	0	0	0	N/A	20th
2021	24H GT Series - P4	Car Collection Motorsport	1	0	0	0	0	0	NC†
2022	ADAC GT Masters	Rutronik Racing	14	0	1	0	1	104	14th
2022	GT World Challenge Europe Sprint Cup	Saintéloc Racing	9	0	0	0	2	49.5	6th
2022	GT World Challenge Europe Endurance Cup	Saintéloc Racing	5	1	0	0	1	33	13th
2022	Intercontinental GT Challenge	Audi Sport Team Saintéloc	2	0	0	0	1	15	15th
2022	24 Hours of Nürburgring - SP9	Audi Sport Team Car Collection	1	0	0	0	0	N/A	4th
2023	Deutsche Tourenwagen Masters	Tresor Orange1	16	0	0	0	0	23	23rd
2023	GT World Challenge Europe Sprint Cup	Saintéloc Junior Team	10	0	0	0	1	13	10th
2023	GT World Challenge Europe Endurance Cup	Saintéloc Junior Team	5	0	0	0	0	41	6th
2023	24 Hours of Nürburgring - SP9	Audi Sport Team Land	1	0	0	0	0	N/A	6th
2024	GT World Challenge Europe Endurance Cup	Rutronik Racing	5	0	1	0	0	13	17th
2024	GT World Challenge Europe Sprint Cup	Rutronik Racing	10	1	1	0	3	41	5th
2024	Intercontinental GT Challenge	Rutronik Racing	1	0	0	0	0	28	8th
2024	Intercontinental GT Challenge	Lionspeed GP	1	0	0	0	0	28	8th
2024	Intercontinental GT Challenge	Herberth Motorsport	1	0	1	0	0	28	8th
2024	Nürburgring Langstrecken-Serie - SP9	Lionspeed GP	2	0	0	0	2	*	*
2024	24 Hours of Nürburgring - SP9 Pro-Am	Lionspeed GP	1	1	1	0	1	N/A	**1st**
2024	GT World Challenge America - Pro-Am	Herberth Motorsport	1	0	1	1	0	0	NC†
2025	GT World Challenge Europe Endurance Cup	Rutronik Racing	5	0	0	0	3	73	**1st**
2025	GT World Challenge Europe Sprint Cup	Rutronik Racing	10	1	0	0	4	69.5	5th
2025	Intercontinental GT Challenge	Rutronik Racing	1	1	0	0	1	33	10th
2025	Intercontinental GT Challenge	Phantom Global Racing	1	0	0	0	0	33	10th
2025	Intercontinental GT Challenge	Wright Motorsports	1	0	0	0	0	33	10th
2025	Intercontinental GT Challenge	Scherer Sport PHX	0	0	0	0	0	33	10th
2025	Nürburgring Langstrecken-Serie - SP9	Scherer Sport PHX	4	2	0	2	2	0	NC††
2025	24 Hours of Nürburgring - SP9 Pro	Scherer Sport PHX	0	0	0	0	0	N/A	WD
2025	24H Series - 992	Lionspeed GP							
2025-26	24H Series Middle East - GT3	Absolute Racing							
2026	Nürburgring Langstrecken-Serie - SP9	Team ABT Sportsline							
2026	24 Hours of Nürburgring - SP9	Red Bull Team Abt	1	0	1	0	0	N/A	DSQ
2026	GT World Challenge Europe Endurance Cup	Rutronik Racing	5	0	0	0	0	6	29th
2026	GT World Challenge Europe Sprint Cup	Rutronik Racing	10	0	0	0	2	22	14th

^{†} As Niederhauser was a guest driver, he was ineligible to score points. ^{††} No. 16 Scherer Sport PHX is ineligible for points. ^{*} Season still in progress.

=== Complete GP3 Series results ===
(key) (Races in bold indicate pole position) (Races in italics indicate fastest lap)

Year	Entrant	1	2	3	4	5	6	7	8	9	10	11	12	13	14	15	16	17	18	D.C.	Points
2012	Jenzer Motorsport	CAT; FEA; 4	CAT; SPR; 5	MON; FEA; Ret	MON; SPR; 15	VAL; FEA; 8	VAL; SPR; 1	SIL; FEA; 10	SIL; SPR; 3	HOC; FEA; 1	HOC; SPR; 9	HUN; FEA; 16	HUN; SPR; 2	SPA; FEA; 11	SPA; SPR; 6	MNZ; FEA; 5	MNZ; SPR; Ret			7th	101
2013	Jenzer Motorsport	CAT; FEA; 2	CAT; SPR; 3	VAL; FEA; 13	VAL; SPR; Ret	SIL; FEA; 15	SIL; SPR; 11	NÜR; FEA; 12	NÜR; SPR; 8	HUN; FEA; 25	HUN; SPR; 15	SPA; FEA; Ret	SPA; SPR; 9	MNZ; FEA; 8	MNZ; SPR; Ret	YMC; FEA; Ret	YMC; SPR; 15			13th	33
2014	Arden International	CAT; FEA; 10	CAT; SPR; 9	RBR; FEA; 10	RBR; SPR; 6	SIL; FEA; 13	SIL; SPR; Ret	HOC; FEA; 12	HOC; SPR; 6	HUN; FEA; 6	HUN; SPR; 1	SPA; FEA; Ret	SPA; SPR; Ret	MNZ; FEA; 13	MNZ; SPR; 19	SOC; FEA; 8	SOC; SPR; 1	YMC; FEA; 7	YMC; SPR; DSQ	10th	62

=== Complete European Le Mans Series results ===
(key) (Races in bold indicate pole position) (Races in italics indicate fastest lap)

Year	Team	Class	Car	Engine	1	2	3	4	5	Rank	Points
2013	Race Performance	LMP2	Oreca 03	Judd HK 3.6 L V8	SIL; 2	IMO; 4	RBR; 5	HUN; Ret	LEC	9th	40
2014	Race Performance	LMP2	Oreca 03	Judd HK 3.6 L V8	SIL	IMO	RBR	LEC	EST; 4	20th	12

=== 24 Hours of Le Mans results ===
Year	Team	Co-Drivers	Car	Class	Laps	Pos.	Class Pos.
2013	(Switzerland) Race Performance	(Switzerland) Michel Frey (Netherlands) Jeroen Bleekemolen	Oreca 03-Judd	LMP2	314	18th	9th

=== Complete GP2 Series results ===
(key) (Races in bold indicate pole position) (Races in italics indicate fastest lap)

Year	Entrant	1	2	3	4	5	6	7	8	9	10	11	12	13	14	15	16	17	18	19	20	21	22	DC	Points
2015	Daiko Team Lazarus	BHR; FEA	BHR; SPR	CAT; FEA	CAT; SPR	MON; FEA	MON; SPR	RBR; FEA	RBR; SPR	SIL; FEA	SIL; SPR	HUN; FEA	HUN; SPR	SPA; FEA	SPA; SPR	MNZ; FEA; 17	MNZ; SPR; 17	SOC; FEA	SOC; SPR	BHR; FEA	BHR; SPR	YMC; FEA	YMC; SPR	34th	0

=== Complete ADAC GT Masters results ===
(key) (Races in bold indicate pole position) (Races in italics indicate fastest lap)

Year	Team	Car	1	2	3	4	5	6	7	8	9	10	11	12	13	14	DC	Points
2016	ADAC NSA / Attempto Racing	Lamborghini Huracán GT3	OSC; 1; 16	OSC; 2 Ret	SAC; 1 Ret	SAC; 2; 16	LAU; 1; 14	LAU; 2 Ret	RBR; 1	RBR; 2	NÜR; 1	NÜR; 2	ZAN; 1	ZAN; 2	HOC; 1	HOC; 2	63rd	0
2017	Aust Motorsport	Audi R8 LMS	OSC; 1; 24	OSC; 2 Ret	LAU; 1 Ret	LAU; 2; 8	RBR; 1; 15	RBR; 2; 11	ZAN; 1; 11	ZAN; 2; 7	NÜR; 1; 4	NÜR; 2; 5	SAC; 1; 21	SAC; 2; 10	HOC; 1; 13	HOC; 2; 10	21st	34
2019	Rutronik Racing	Audi R8 LMS Evo	OSC; 1; 2	OSC; 2; 4	**MST**; **1**; **1**	MST; 2; 4	RBR; 1; 4	RBR; 2; 3	ZAN; 1; 17	ZAN; 2; 9	NÜR; 1; 3	NÜR; 2; 2	HOC; 1; 9	**HOC**; **2**; **1**	SAC; 1; 19	**SAC**; **2**; **1**	1st	205
2020	Rutronik Racing	Audi R8 LMS Evo	LAU1; 1; 6	LAU1; 2; 5	NÜR; 1; 3	**NÜR**; **2**; 10	HOC; 1; 2	HOC; 2; 1	SAC; 1; 7	SAC; 2; 3	RBR; 1; 8	RBR; 2; 8	LAU2; 1; 5	LAU2; 2; 6	OSC; 1; 6	OSC; 2 Ret	4th	160
2021	Phoenix Racing	Audi R8 LMS Evo	OSC; 1; 10	OSC; 2; 18	RBR; 1; 15	RBR; 2; 12	ZAN; 1; 22	ZAN; 2; 9	LAU; 1 Ret	LAU; 2; 16	SAC; 1; 22	SAC; 2; 6	HOC; 1; 5	HOC; 2 Ret	NÜR; 1; 12	NÜR; 2; 5	18th	54
2022	Rutronik Racing	Audi R8 LMS Evo II	OSC; 1; 9	**OSC**; **2**; 2^{1}	RBR; 1; 9	RBR; 2; 10	ZAN; 1; 10	ZAN; 2; 18†	NÜR; 1; 4	NÜR; 2; 12	LAU; 1; 4^{2}	LAU; 2; 7	SAC; 1; 6	SAC; 2 Ret	HOC; 1; 13	HOC; 2 Ret	14th	104

=== Complete GT World Challenge Europe results ===
==== GT World Challenge Europe Endurance Cup ====
Year	Team	Car	Class	1	2	3	4	5	6	7	Pos.	Points
2016	Attempto Racing	Lamborghini Huracán GT3	Pro	MNZ; 19	SIL; 10	LEC; 10	SPA; 6H; 21	SPA; 12H; 23	SPA; 24H; 14	NÜR; 22	46th	2
2018	Reiter Young Stars	Lamborghini Gallardo R-EX	Silver	MNZ; 16	SIL; 23	LEC; Ret	SPA; 6H	SPA; 12H	SPA; 24H	CAT; 36	11th	36
2020	Audi Sport Team Attempto Racing	Audi R8 LMS Evo	Pro	IMO	NÜR	SPA; 6H; 5	SPA; 12H; 10	SPA; 24H; 2	LEC		14th	23
2021	Saintéloc Racing	Audi R8 LMS Evo II	Pro	MNZ	LEC	SPA; 6H; 17	SPA; 12H; 11	SPA; 24H; 6	NÜR	CAT	24th	8
2022	Saintéloc Junior Team	Audi R8 LMS Evo II	Pro	IMO; 9	LEC; Ret	SPA; 6H; 16	SPA; 12H; 28	SPA; 24H; 19	HOC; 1	BAR; 7	13th	33
2023	Saintéloc Junior Team	Audi R8 LMS Evo II	Pro	MNZ; 4	LEC; 4	SPA; 6H; 23	SPA; 12H; 24	SPA; 24H; 16	NÜR; 4	CAT; 9	6th	41
2024	Rutronik Racing	Porsche 911 GT3 R (992)	Pro	LEC; 5	SPA; 6H; 38	SPA; 12H; 25	SPA; 24H; 9	**NÜR**; Ret	MNZ; 13	JED; 36†	17th	13
2025	Rutronik Racing	Porsche 911 GT3 R (992)	Pro	LEC; 2	MNZ; 21	SPA; 6H; 4	SPA; 12H; 6	SPA; 24H; 2	NÜR; 3	CAT; 7	1st	73
2026	Rutronik Racing	Lamborghini Temerario GT3	Pro	LEC; Ret	MNZ; 7	SPA; 6H; 18	SPA; 12H; 18	SPA; 24H; 19	NÜR; 19	ALG; 50	29th	6

^{*} Season still in progress.

==== GT World Challenge Europe Sprint Cup ====
(key) (Races in bold indicate pole position) (Races in italics indicate fastest lap)

Year	Team	Car	Class	1	2	3	4	5	6	7	8	9	10	Pos.	Points
2016	Attempto Racing	Lamborghini Huracán GT3	Pro	MIS; QR; 18	MIS; CR; 10	BRH; QR; 25	BRH; CR; Ret	NÜR; QR; 12	NÜR; CR; 19	HUN; QR; Ret	HUN; CR; DNS	CAT; QR	CAT; CR	31st	1
2022	Saintéloc Racing	Audi R8 LMS Evo II	Pro	BRH; 1; 5	BRH; 2; 6	MAG; 1; 4	MAG; 2; 3	ZAN; 1; 5	ZAN; 2; 7	MIS; 1 Ret	MIS; 2 DNS	VAL; 1; 9	VAL; 2; 2	6th	49.5
2023	Saintéloc Junior Team	Audi R8 LMS Evo II	Pro	BRH; 1; 28	BRH; 2; 10	MIS; 1; 17	MIS; 2; 7	HOC; 1; 31†	HOC; 2; 3	VAL; 1; 12	VAL; 2; 17	ZAN; 1 Ret	ZAN; 2 Ret	10th	13
2024	Rutronik Racing	Porsche 911 GT3 R (992)	Pro	BRH; 1; 14	BRH; 2; 8	MIS; 1; 7	MIS; 2; 5	HOC; 1; 7	HOC; 2; 14	MAG; 1; 3	MAG; 2; 16	CAT; 1; 2	**CAT**; **2**; 1	5th	41
2025	Rutronik Racing	Porsche 911 GT3 R (992)	Pro	BRH; 1; 9	BRH; 2; 3	ZAN; 1; 1	ZAN; 2; 5	MIS; 1; 7	MIS; 2; 3	MAG; 1; 2	MAG; 2; 5	VAL; 1; 14	VAL; 2; 5	5th	69.5
2026	Rutronik Racing	Lamborghini Temerario GT3	Pro	BRH; 1; 20	BRH; 2; 18	MIS; 1; 11	MIS; 2; 26	MAG; 1; 41	MAG; 2; 3	ZAN; 1; 22	ZAN; 2; 7	CAT; 1; 3	CAT; 2 Ret	14th	22

^{†} Driver did not finish the race, but was classified as he completed over 90% of the race distance.

=== Complete Deutsche Tourenwagen Masters results ===
(key) (Races in bold indicate pole position; races in italics indicate fastest lap)

Year	Entrant	Chassis	1	2	3	4	5	6	7	8	9	10	11	12	13	14	15	16	Rank	Points
2023	Tresor Orange1	Audi R8 LMS Evo II	OSC; 1 Ret	OSC; 2; 19	ZAN; 1; 20	ZAN; 2; 8	NOR; 1; 15	NOR; 2 Ret	NÜR; 1; 9	NÜR; 2 Ret	LAU; 1 Ret	LAU; 2 Ret	SAC; 1 Ret	SAC; 2; 9	RBR; 1; 23	RBR; 2; 17	HOC; 1; 19	HOC; 2; 19	23rd	23

Sporting positions
Preceded by Brandon Maïsano; Formula Abarth	Formula Abarth Italian Series; Champion; 2011	Succeeded by Nicolas Costa
Preceded by Mathieu Jaminet; Robert Renauer	ADAC GT Masters; Champion; 2019; With: Kelvin van der Linde	Succeeded by Michael Ammermüller; Christian Engelhart
