= GT World Challenge Europe Sprint Cup =

SRO grand tourer sports car racing series

- Category: Grand tourer
- Country: International
- Inaugural season: 2013
- Tyre suppliers: Pirelli
- Drivers' champion: (Denmark) Bastian Buus (Switzerland) Ricardo Feller
- Teams' champion: (Germany) Lionspeed GP
- Official website: gt-world-challenge-europe.com

The GT World Challenge Europe Sprint Cup is a sports car racing series organized by the Stéphane Ratel Organisation (SRO) with the approval of the Fédération Internationale de l'Automobile (FIA). Born as the FIA GT Series in 2013, it was sponsored by Blancpain from 2014 to 2019, and was variously branded as the Blancpain Sprint Series in 2014 and 2015, the Blancpain GT Series Sprint Cup from 2016 to 2018, and the Blancpain GT World Challenge Europe in 2019. In 2020, Amazon Web Services was named official presenter and the series was branded as "GT World Challenge Powered by AWS". Fanatec concurrently served as title sponsor between 2021 and 2024.

The championship now exclusively races in Europe, but had in previous years visited non-European countries, including Azerbaijan and Russia. The series continues the sprint format for GT-cars carried out by the defunct FIA GT1 World Championship.

== Regulations ==
The GT World Challenge Europe Sprint Cup is contested with GT3-spec cars. Each event consists of two races over a weekend with two drivers per car and a mandatory pit stop.

== Races ==
The schedule of the GT World Challenge Europe Sprint Cup consists of races in Europe.

== History ==
In 2013, the FIA GT Series was created after the demise of the FIA GT1 World Championship and the FIA GT3 European Championship. The series was supposed to form the FIA GT World Series in conjunction with the GT Endurance Series. This plan was abandoned before the start of the 2013 season.

The name of the FIA GT Series resembles the FIA GT Championship (1997-2009) that was known for its endurance races all over the world. Except for the mandatory driver changes, the two championships differ highly in sporting and technical regulations.

In 2014, the competition changed the name to the Sprint Series.

in 2016 the SRO announced both the Sprint and Endurance Series integrated into the GT Series, putting the emphasis on the overall drivers' and manufacturers' titles causing the Sprint Series name to change from Sprint Series to GT Series Sprint Cup.

On 25 May 2018, the SRO acquired promotional rights to the GT World Challenge America, a North American GT series sanctioned by the United States Auto Club. On 29 September 2018, the SRO changed the names of the GT Asia and GT Series Sprint Cup, to adopt the World Challenge name used in North America. The three series together will be known as the GT World Challenge (GT WC), with each series adding their region to the series name (America, Asia, Europe).

In 2019, SRO announced that sponsorship by Blancpain had come to an end. For 2020, the GT World Challenge Europe was renamed the GT World Challenge Europe Sprint Cup, with the GT Series and GT Series Endurance Cup being renamed the GT World Challenge Europe and GT World Challenge Europe Endurance Cup respectively.

In 2020, SRO named AWS as the "official presenter" of the series, and the series was branded as "GT World Challenge Powered by AWS". In 2021, Fanatec became the title sponsor of the series. Giving the series its current name of "Fanatec GT World Challenge Europe Powered by AWS".

== Champions ==
=== Drivers ===
| Year | Pro Cup | Silver Cup | Pro-Am Trophy | Gentlemen Trophy |
|---|---|---|---|---|
| 2013 | (Monaco) Stéphane Ortelli (Belgium) Laurens Vanthoor | —N/a | (Russia) Sergey Afanasyev (Sweden) Andreas Simonsen | (Czech Republic) Petr Charouz (Czech Republic) Jan Stoviček |
| 2014 | (Germany) Maximilian Götz | (France) Vincent Abril (Poland) Mateusz Lisowski | (Germany) Marc Basseng (United Kingdom) Alessandro Latif | —N/a |
| 2015 | (France) Vincent Abril (Germany) Maximilian Buhk | (Netherlands) Jules Szymkowiak | (Russia) Alexey Karachev | —N/a |
| Year | Overall | Silver Cup | Pro-Am Cup | Am Cup |
| 2016 | (Belgium) Enzo Ide | (Italy) Michele Beretta (Germany) Luca Stolz | (Poland) Michał Broniszewski (Italy) Giacomo Piccini | (Germany) Claudio Sdanewitsch |
| 2017 | (Netherlands) Robin Frijns (United Kingdom) Stuart Leonard | (Germany) Fabian Schiller (Netherlands) Jules Szymkowiak | (Germany) Daniel Keilwitz (Germany) Alexander Mattschull | (United States) Stephen Earle (South Africa) David Perel |
| 2018 | (Italy) Raffaele Marciello (United Kingdom) Michael Meadows | (Germany) Nico Bastian (United Kingdom) Jack Manchester | (France) Nyls Stievenart (Germany) Markus Winkelhock | (France) Pierre Feligioni (France) Claude-Yves Gosselin |
| 2019 | (Italy) Andrea Caldarelli (Italy) Marco Mapelli | (Germany) Nico Bastian (France) Thomas Neubauer | (Japan) Hiroshi Hamaguchi (United Kingdom) Phil Keen | (Germany) Florian Scholze (Germany) Wolfgang Triller |
| 2020 | (Belgium) Dries Vanthoor (Belgium) Charles Weerts | (France) Simon Gachet (France) Steven Palette | (Italy) Eddie Cheever III (United Kingdom) Chris Froggatt | —N/a |
| 2021 | (Belgium) Dries Vanthoor (2) (Belgium) Charles Weerts (2) | (Switzerland) Alex Fontana | (Portugal) Henrique Chaves (Portugal) Miguel Ramos | —N/a |
| 2022 | (Belgium) Dries Vanthoor (3) (Belgium) Charles Weerts (3) | (France) Pierre-Alexandre Jean (Belgium) Ulysse de Pauw | (Portugal) Miguel Ramos (United Kingdom) Dean Macdonald | —N/a |
| Year | Overall | Gold Cup | Silver Cup | Bronze Cup |
| 2023 | (San Marino) Mattia Drudi (Switzerland) Ricardo Feller | (Germany) Niklas Krütten (Australia) Calan Williams | (Australia) Jordan Love | (United Kingdom) Alex Malykhin |
| 2024 | (Austria) Lucas Auer (Germany) Maro Engel | (Germany) Luca Engstler (Austria) Max Hofer | (Australia) Calan Williams | (United Kingdom) Dan Harper (United Kingdom) Darren Leung |
| 2025 | (South Africa) Kelvin van der Linde (Belgium) Charles Weerts (4) | (United Kingdom) Chris Lulham (Netherlands) Thierry Vermeulen | (United Arab Emirates) Jamie Day (Belgium) Kobe Pauwels | (Germany) Dennis Marschall (United States) Dustin Blattner |
| 2026 | (Denmark) Bastian Buus (Switzerland) Ricardo Feller (2) | (Italy) Tommaso Mosca (Peru) Matías Zagazeta | (Belgium) Matisse Lismont (Argentina) Ignacio Montenegro | (Italy) Eddie Cheever III (Republic of Ireland) Peter Dempsey |

=== Teams ===
| Year | Pro Cup | Silver Cup | Pro-Am Trophy | Gentlemen Trophy |
|---|---|---|---|---|
| 2013 | (Belgium) Belgian Audi Club Team WRT | —N/a | (Czech Republic) HTP Gravity Charouz | (Czech Republic) HTP Gravity Charouz |
| 2014 | (Belgium) Belgian Audi Club Team WRT (2) | (Belgium) Belgian Audi Club Team WRT | (Germany) Phoenix Racing | —N/a |
| 2015 | (Belgium) Belgian Audi Club Team WRT (3) | (Germany) Bentley Team HTP | (Russia) GT Russian Team | —N/a |
| Year | Overall | Silver Cup | Pro-Am Cup | Am Cup |
| 2016 | (Belgium) Belgian Audi Club Team WRT (4) | Not awarded | (Switzerland) Kessel Racing | (Italy) AF Corse |
| 2017 | (Belgium) Belgian Audi Club Team WRT (5) | (Germany) HTP Motorsport | (Germany) Rinaldi Racing | (Switzerland) Kessel Racing |
| 2018 | (Belgium) Belgian Audi Club Team WRT (6) | Not awarded | (France) Saintéloc Racing | (Belgium) Boutsen Ginion Racing |
| 2019 | (France) AKKA ASP Team | (France) AKKA ASP Team | (China) Orange1 FFF Racing Team | (Austria) HB Racing |
| 2020 | (Belgium) Belgian Audi Club Team WRT (7) | (France) Saintéloc Racing | (United Kingdom) Sky - Tempesta Racing | —N/a |
| 2021 | (Belgium) Belgian Audi Club Team WRT (8) | (Switzerland) Emil Frey Racing | (United Kingdom) Barwell Motorsport | —N/a |
| 2022 | (Belgium) Team WRT (9) | (Italy) AF Corse | (Italy) AF Corse | —N/a |
| Year | Overall | Gold Cup | Silver Cup | Bronze Cup |
| 2023 | (Germany) Tresor Orange1 | (Belgium) Boutsen VDS | (Germany) Haupt Racing Team | (Lithuania) Pure Rxcing |
| 2024 | (Belgium) Team WRT (10) | (Germany) Liqui Moly Team Engstler by OneGroup | (Belgium) Team WRT | (United Kingdom) Century Motorsport |
| 2025 | (Belgium) Team WRT (11) | (Switzerland) Emil Frey Racing | (Belgium) Comtoyou Racing | (Switzerland) Kessel Racing |
| 2026 | (Belgium) Team WRT (12) | (Italy) AF Corse | (Belgium) Team WRT | (United Kingdom) Ziggo Sport – Tempesta Racing |

== See also ==
- British GT Championship
- GT World Challenge Australia
- GT World Challenge America
- GT World Challenge Asia
- GT World Challenge Europe
- GT World Challenge Europe Endurance Cup
