= 2019 Blancpain GT World Challenge Europe =

2019 European GT racing championship

The 2019 Blancpain GT World Challenge Europe was the seventh season of the Blancpain GT Series Sprint Cup following on from the demise of the SRO Motorsports Group's FIA GT1 World Championship (an auto racing series for grand tourer cars), the sixth under the Blancpain partnership. The season began on 4 May at Brands Hatch and ended on 8 September at the Hungaroring. It was the first season of the unification of GT3 sprint series across the globe under the World Challenge name.

== Calendar ==
At the annual press conference during the 2018 24 Hours of Spa on 27 July, the Stéphane Ratel Organisation announced the first draft of the 2019 calendar. Zolder was initially replaced by the Red Bull Ring, before Zandvoort was chosen to host a race weekend. The Endurance Cup round in Barcelona would become an World Challenge Europe round, replacing the round at the Nürburgring, before the two tracks were swapped around again in the final draft of the calendar released on 22 October.

| Round | Circuit | Date |
|---|---|---|
| 1 | (United Kingdom) Brands Hatch, Kent, Great Britain | 5 May |
| 2 | Misano World Circuit Marco Simoncelli, Misano Adriatico, Italy | 30 June |
| 3 | Circuit Zandvoort, Zandvoort, Netherlands | 14 July |
| 4 | Nürburgring, Nürburg, Germany | 1 September |
| 5 | Hungaroring, Mogyoród, Hungary | 8 September |

== Entry list ==
A cap of 30 cars was placed in an attempt to reduce accidents on narrower tracks.

| Team | Car | No. | Drivers | Class | Rounds |
|---|---|---|---|---|---|
| (Belgium) Belgian Audi Club Team WRT | Audi R8 LMS Evo | 1 | (Argentina) Ezequiel Pérez Companc | P | 1, 3–5 |
| (Belgium) Belgian Audi Club Team WRT | Audi R8 LMS Evo | 1 | (Belgium) Dries Vanthoor | P | 1, 3–5 |
| (Belgium) Belgian Audi Club Team WRT | Audi R8 LMS Evo | 2 | (Belgium) Charles Weerts | P | All |
| (Belgium) Belgian Audi Club Team WRT | Audi R8 LMS Evo | 2 | (Germany) Christopher Mies | P | 1, 3–5 |
| (Belgium) Belgian Audi Club Team WRT | Audi R8 LMS Evo | 2 | (Belgium) Dries Vanthoor | P | 2 |
| (Belgium) Belgian Audi Club Team WRT | Audi R8 LMS Evo | 10 | (Netherlands) Rik Breukers | S | All |
| (Belgium) Belgian Audi Club Team WRT | Audi R8 LMS Evo | 10 | (Colombia) Óscar Tunjo | S | All |
| (Belgium) Belgian Audi Club Team WRT | Audi R8 LMS Evo | 17 | (Australia) Shae Davies | S | All |
| (Belgium) Belgian Audi Club Team WRT | Audi R8 LMS Evo | 17 | (United Kingdom) Tom Gamble | S | All |
| (Germany) Black Falcon | Mercedes-AMG GT3 | 4 | (Germany) Maro Engel | P | All |
| (Germany) Black Falcon | Mercedes-AMG GT3 | 4 | (Germany) Luca Stolz | P | All |
| (Germany) Phoenix Racing | Audi R8 LMS Evo | 5 | (Germany) Kim-Luis Schramm | P | All |
| (Germany) Phoenix Racing | Audi R8 LMS Evo | 5 | (Germany) Frank Stippler | P | 1–2 |
| (Germany) Phoenix Racing | Audi R8 LMS Evo | 5 | (France) Jean-Karl Vernay | P | 3 |
| (Germany) Phoenix Racing | Audi R8 LMS Evo | 5 | (United Kingdom) Jamie Green | P | 4–5 |
| (Germany) Phoenix Racing | Audi R8 LMS Evo | 11 | (United Kingdom) Finlay Hutchison | P | All |
| (Germany) Phoenix Racing | Audi R8 LMS Evo | 11 | (Belgium) Frédéric Vervisch | P | All |
| (Italy) Audi Sport Italia | Audi R8 LMS Evo | 7 | (Italy) Andrea Fontana | P | 2 |
| (Italy) Audi Sport Italia | Audi R8 LMS Evo | 7 | (Germany) Pierre Kaffer | P | 2 |
| (Germany) GetSpeed Performance | Mercedes-AMG GT3 | 13 | (Germany) Adam Osieka | Am | 2 |
| (Germany) GetSpeed Performance | Mercedes-AMG GT3 | 13 | (Russia) Denis Remenyako | Am | 2 |
| (Belgium) Boutsen Ginion | Lamborghini Huracán GT3 Evo | 15 | (France) Pierre Feligioni | Am | 2 |
| (Belgium) Boutsen Ginion | Lamborghini Huracán GT3 Evo | 15 | (France) Claude-Yves Gosselin | Am | 2 |
| (Austria) GRT Grasser Racing Team | Lamborghini Huracán GT3 Evo | 19 | (Italy) Michele Beretta | S | 3 |
| (Austria) GRT Grasser Racing Team | Lamborghini Huracán GT3 Evo | 19 | (Switzerland) Rolf Ineichen | S | 3 |
| (Austria) GRT Grasser Racing Team | Lamborghini Huracán GT3 Evo | 63 | (Italy) Mirko Bortolotti | P | All |
| (Austria) GRT Grasser Racing Team | Lamborghini Huracán GT3 Evo | 63 | (Germany) Christian Engelhart | P | All |
| (France) Tech 1 Racing | Lexus RC F GT3 | 23 | (United Kingdom) Jack Hawksworth | P | 3–5 |
| (France) Tech 1 Racing | Lexus RC F GT3 | 23 | (France) Aurélien Panis | P | 3–5 |
| (France) Saintéloc Racing | Audi R8 LMS Evo | 24 | (Monaco) Stéphane Ortelli | PA | 1–3 |
| (France) Saintéloc Racing | Audi R8 LMS Evo | 24 | (France) Nyls Stievenart | PA | 1–3 |
| (France) Saintéloc Racing | Audi R8 LMS Evo | 24 | (France) Dorian Boccolacci | P | 4–5 |
| (France) Saintéloc Racing | Audi R8 LMS Evo | 24 | (Monaco) Stéphane Ortelli | P | 4–5 |
| (France) Saintéloc Racing | Audi R8 LMS Evo | 25 | (France) Simon Gachet | P | All |
| (France) Saintéloc Racing | Audi R8 LMS Evo | 25 | (Germany) Christopher Haase | P | All |
| (France) Saintéloc Racing | Audi R8 LMS Evo | 26 | (France) Steven Palette | P | All |
| (France) Saintéloc Racing | Audi R8 LMS Evo | 26 | (Germany) Markus Winkelhock | P | All |
| (Italy) AF Corse | Ferrari 488 GT3 | 52 | (Italy) Andrea Bertolini | PA | All |
| (Italy) AF Corse | Ferrari 488 GT3 | 52 | (Belgium) Louis Machiels | PA | All |
| (Italy) Dinamic Motorsport | Porsche 911 GT3 R | 54 | (Germany) Sven Müller | P | 5 |
| (Italy) Dinamic Motorsport | Porsche 911 GT3 R | 54 | (Italy) Giorgio Roda | P | 5 |
| (Germany) Attempto Racing | Audi R8 LMS Evo | 55 | (Australia) Nick Foster | P | All |
| (Germany) Attempto Racing | Audi R8 LMS Evo | 55 | (Netherlands) Steijn Schothorst | P | All |
| (Germany) Attempto Racing | Audi R8 LMS Evo | 56 | (Netherlands) Milan Dontje | S | All |
| (Germany) Attempto Racing | Audi R8 LMS Evo | 56 | (Italy) Mattia Drudi | S | All |
| (Germany) Attempto Racing | Audi R8 LMS Evo | 66 | (South Africa) Kelvin van der Linde | P | All |
| (Germany) Attempto Racing | Audi R8 LMS Evo | 66 | (Austria) Clemens Schmid | P | All |
| (Switzerland) R-Motorsport | Aston Martin Vantage AMR GT3 | 62 | (Switzerland) Hugo de Sadeleer | S | All |
| (Switzerland) R-Motorsport | Aston Martin Vantage AMR GT3 | 62 | (Finland) Aaro Vainio | S | All |
| (Switzerland) R-Motorsport | Aston Martin Vantage AMR GT3 | 76 | (United Kingdom) Ricky Collard | P | All |
| (Switzerland) R-Motorsport | Aston Martin Vantage AMR GT3 | 76 | (Germany) Marvin Kirchhöfer | P | All |
| (France) AKKA ASP Team | Mercedes-AMG GT3 | 87 | (France) Jim Pla | PA | All |
| (France) AKKA ASP Team | Mercedes-AMG GT3 | 87 | (France) Jean-Luc Beaubelique | PA | 1, 5 |
| (France) AKKA ASP Team | Mercedes-AMG GT3 | 87 | (Italy) Mauro Ricci | PA | 2–4 |
| (France) AKKA ASP Team | Mercedes-AMG GT3 | 88 | (Monaco) Vincent Abril | P | All |
| (France) AKKA ASP Team | Mercedes-AMG GT3 | 88 | (Italy) Raffaele Marciello | P | All |
| (France) AKKA ASP Team | Mercedes-AMG GT3 | 89 | (Germany) Nico Bastian | S | All |
| (France) AKKA ASP Team | Mercedes-AMG GT3 | 89 | (France) Thomas Neubauer | S | All |
| (France) AKKA ASP Team | Mercedes-AMG GT3 | 90 | (Russia) Timur Boguslavskiy | S | All |
| (France) AKKA ASP Team | Mercedes-AMG GT3 | 90 | (Germany) Fabian Schiller | S | 1–2, 4 |
| (France) AKKA ASP Team | Mercedes-AMG GT3 | 90 | (Brazil) Felipe Fraga | S | 3, 5 |
| (Switzerland) Kessel Racing | Ferrari 488 GT3 | 111 | (United States) Stephen Earle | Am | 4 |
| (Switzerland) Kessel Racing | Ferrari 488 GT3 | 111 | (Finland) Rory Penttinen | Am | 4 |
| (Germany) Rinaldi Racing | Ferrari 488 GT3 | 333 | (South Africa) David Perel | PA | All |
| (Germany) Rinaldi Racing | Ferrari 488 GT3 | 333 | (Russia) Rinat Salikhov | PA | All |
| (Austria) HB Racing | Ferrari 488 GT3 | 444 | (Germany) Florian Scholze | Am | All |
| (Austria) HB Racing | Ferrari 488 GT3 | 444 | (Germany) Wolfgang Triller | Am | All |
| (China) Orange1 FFF Racing Team | Lamborghini Huracán GT3 Evo | 519 | (Japan) Hiroshi Hamaguchi | PA | All |
| (China) Orange1 FFF Racing Team | Lamborghini Huracán GT3 Evo | 519 | (United Kingdom) Phil Keen | PA | All |
| (China) Orange1 FFF Racing Team | Lamborghini Huracán GT3 Evo | 555 | (Mexico) Diego Menchaca | S | All |
| (China) Orange1 FFF Racing Team | Lamborghini Huracán GT3 Evo | 555 | (United States) Taylor Proto | S | All |
| (China) Orange1 FFF Racing Team | Lamborghini Huracán GT3 Evo | 563 | (Italy) Andrea Caldarelli | P | All |
| (China) Orange1 FFF Racing Team | Lamborghini Huracán GT3 Evo | 563 | (Italy) Marco Mapelli | P | All |

| Icon | Class |
|---|---|
| P | Pro Cup |
| S | Silver Cup |
| PA | Pro-Am Cup |
| Am | Am Cup |

== Race results ==
Bold indicates overall winner.

| Round | | Circuit | Pole position | Pro Winners | Silver Winners | Pro-Am Winners | Am Winners | Report |
|---|---|---|---|---|---|---|---|---|
| 1 | R1 | (United Kingdom) Brands Hatch | (Germany) No. 4 Black Falcon | (Germany) No. 4 Black Falcon | **(France) No. 89 AKKA ASP Team** | (Germany) No. 333 Rinaldi Racing | (Austria) No. 444 HB Racing | Report |
| 1 | R1 | (United Kingdom) Brands Hatch | (Germany) Maro Engel (Germany) Luca Stolz | (Germany) Maro Engel (Germany) Luca Stolz | **(Germany) Nico Bastian** **(France) Thomas Neubauer** | (South Africa) David Perel (Russia) Rinat Salikhov | (Germany) Florian Scholze (Germany) Wolfgang Triller | Report |
| 1 | R2 | (United Kingdom) Brands Hatch | (France) No. 90 AKKA ASP Team | **(Germany) No. 4 Black Falcon** | (France) No. 89 AKKA ASP Team | (China) No. 519 Orange1 FFF Racing Team | (Austria) No. 444 HB Racing | Report |
| 1 | R2 | (United Kingdom) Brands Hatch | (Russia) Timur Boguslavskiy (Germany) Fabian Schiller | **(Germany) Maro Engel** **(Germany) Luca Stolz** | (Germany) Nico Bastian (France) Thomas Neubauer | (Japan) Hiroshi Hamaguchi (United Kingdom) Phil Keen | (Germany) Florian Scholze (Germany) Wolfgang Triller | Report |
| 2 | R1 | (Italy) Misano | (Belgium) No. 2 Belgian Audi Club Team WRT | **(China) No. 563 Orange1 FFF Racing Team** | (France) No. 90 AKKA ASP Team | (Italy) No. 52 AF Corse | (Austria) No. 444 HB Racing | Report |
| 2 | R1 | (Italy) Misano | (Belgium) Dries Vanthoor (Belgium) Charles Weerts | **(Italy) Andrea Caldarelli** **(Italy) Marco Mapelli** | (Russia) Timur Boguslavskiy (Germany) Fabian Schiller | (Italy) Andrea Bertolini (Belgium) Louis Machiels | (Germany) Florian Scholze (Germany) Wolfgang Triller | Report |
| 2 | R2 | (Italy) Misano | (France) No. 88 AKKA ASP Team | **(Belgium) No. 2 Belgian Audi Club Team WRT** | (France) No. 89 AKKA ASP Team | (China) No. 519 Orange1 FFF Racing Team | (Austria) No. 444 HB Racing | Report |
| 2 | R2 | (Italy) Misano | (Monaco) Vincent Abril (Italy) Raffaele Marciello | **(Belgium) Dries Vanthoor** **(Belgium) Charles Weerts** | (Germany) Nico Bastian (France) Thomas Neubauer | (Japan) Hiroshi Hamaguchi (United Kingdom) Phil Keen | (Germany) Florian Scholze (Germany) Wolfgang Triller | Report |
| 3 | R1 | (Netherlands) Zandvoort | (France) No. 88 AKKA ASP Team | **(France) No. 88 AKKA ASP Team** | (Switzerland) No. 62 R-Motorsport | (China) No. 519 Orange1 FFF Racing Team | (Austria) No. 444 HB Racing | Report |
| 3 | R1 | (Netherlands) Zandvoort | (Monaco) Vincent Abril (Italy) Raffaele Marciello | **(Monaco) Vincent Abril** **(Italy) Raffaele Marciello** | (Switzerland) Hugo de Sadeleer (Finland) Aaro Vainio | (Japan) Hiroshi Hamaguchi (United Kingdom) Phil Keen | (Germany) Florian Scholze (Germany) Wolfgang Triller | Report |
| 3 | R2 | (Netherlands) Zandvoort | (France) No. 25 Saintéloc Racing | **(France) No. 25 Saintéloc Racing** | (Switzerland) No. 62 R-Motorsport | (Germany) No. 333 Rinaldi Racing | (Austria) No. 444 HB Racing | Report |
| 3 | R2 | (Netherlands) Zandvoort | (France) Simon Gachet (Germany) Christopher Haase | **(France) Simon Gachet** **(Germany) Christopher Haase** | (Switzerland) Hugo de Sadeleer (Finland) Aaro Vainio | (South Africa) David Perel (Russia) Rinat Salikhov | (Germany) Florian Scholze (Germany) Wolfgang Triller | Report |
| 4 | R1 | (Germany) Nürburgring | (Austria) No. 63 GRT Grasser Racing Team | **(China) No. 563 Orange1 FFF Racing Team** | (Germany) No. 56 Attempto Racing | (Germany) No. 333 Rinaldi Racing | (Switzerland) No. 111 Kessel Racing | Report |
| 4 | R1 | (Germany) Nürburgring | (Italy) Mirko Bortolotti (Germany) Christian Engelhart | **(Italy) Andrea Caldarelli** **(Italy) Marco Mapelli** | (Netherlands) Milan Dontje (Italy) Mattia Drudi | (South Africa) David Perel (Russia) Rinat Salikhov | (United States) Stephen Earle (Finland) Rory Penttinen | Report |
| 4 | R2 | (Germany) Nürburgring | (Belgium) No. 1 Belgian Audi Club Team WRT | **(Switzerland) No. 76 R-Motorsport** | (Belgium) No. 10 Belgian Audi Club Team WRT | (Italy) No. 52 AF Corse | (Austria) No. 444 HB Racing | Report |
| 4 | R2 | (Germany) Nürburgring | (Argentina) Ezequiel Pérez Companc (Belgium) Dries Vanthoor | **(United Kingdom) Ricky Collard** **(Germany) Marvin Kirchhöfer** | (Netherlands) Rik Breukers (Colombia) Óscar Tunjo | (Italy) Andrea Bertolini (Belgium) Louis Machiels | (Germany) Florian Scholze (Germany) Wolfgang Triller | Report |
| 5 | R1 | (Hungary) Hungaroring | (France) No. 88 AKKA ASP Team | **(France) No. 88 AKKA ASP Team** | (France) No. 89 AKKA ASP Team | (France) No. 87 AKKA ASP Team | (Austria) No. 444 HB Racing | Report |
| 5 | R1 | (Hungary) Hungaroring | (Monaco) Vincent Abril (Italy) Raffaele Marciello | **(Monaco) Vincent Abril** **(Italy) Raffaele Marciello** | (Germany) Nico Bastian (France) Thomas Neubauer | (France) Jean-Luc Beaubelique (France) Jim Pla | (Germany) Florian Scholze (Germany) Wolfgang Triller | Report |
| 5 | R2 | (Hungary) Hungaroring | (France) No. 88 AKKA ASP Team | **(France) No. 88 AKKA ASP Team** | (France) No. 90 AKKA ASP Team | (China) No. 519 Orange1 FFF Racing Team | (Austria) No. 444 HB Racing | Report |
| 5 | R2 | (Hungary) Hungaroring | (Monaco) Vincent Abril (Italy) Raffaele Marciello | **(Monaco) Vincent Abril** **(Italy) Raffaele Marciello** | (Russia) Timur Boguslavskiy (Brazil) Felipe Fraga | (Japan) Hiroshi Hamaguchi (United Kingdom) Phil Keen | (Germany) Florian Scholze (Germany) Wolfgang Triller | Report |

== Championship standings ==
Scoring system

Championship points are awarded for the first ten positions in each race. The pole-sitter also receives one point and entries are required to complete 75% of the winning car's race distance in order to be classified and earn points. Individual drivers are required to participate for a minimum of 25 minutes in order to earn championship points in any race.

| Position | **1st** | **2nd** | **3rd** | **4th** | **5th** | **6th** | **7th** | **8th** | **9th** | **10th** | **Pole** |
| Points | 16.5 | 12 | 9.5 | 7.5 | 6 | 4.5 | 3 | 2 | 1 | 0.5 | 1 |

=== Drivers' championships ===
==== Overall ====
| Pos. | Driver | Team | BRH (United Kingdom) | | MIS (Italy) | | ZAN (Netherlands) | | NÜR (Germany) | | HUN (Hungary) | | Points |
|---|---|---|---|---|---|---|---|---|---|---|---|---|---|
| 1 | (Italy) Andrea Caldarelli (Italy) Marco Mapelli | (China) Orange1 FFF Racing Team | Ret | 2 | 1 | 2 | 3 | 7 | 1 | 3 | 5 | 4 | 92.5 |
| 2 | (Germany) Maro Engel (Germany) Luca Stolz | (Germany) Black Falcon | **2** | 1 | 3 | 4 | 4 | 4 | 8 | 4 | 2 | 3 | 92.5 |
| 3 | (Monaco) Vincent Abril (Italy) Raffaele Marciello | (France) AKKA ASP Team | 4 | 19 | 2 | **15** | **1** | 6 | 9 | Ret | **1** | **1** | 78.5 |
| 4 | (Italy) Mirko Bortolotti (Germany) Christian Engelhart | (Austria) GRT Grasser Racing Team | 3 | 10 | 6 | 16 | 2 | 2 | **2** | 8 | 3 | 2 | 75 |
| 5 | (France) Simon Gachet (Germany) Christopher Haase | (France) Saintéloc Racing | 16 | 7 | Ret | 3 | 10 | **1** | 3 | 2 | 6 | 6 | 61 |
| 6 | (Belgium) Charles Weerts | (Belgium) Belgian Audi Club Team WRT | 12 | 6 | **Ret** | 1 | 13 | 5 | 4 | 26 | 8 | 7 | 40.5 |
| 7 | (Belgium) Dries Vanthoor | (Belgium) Belgian Audi Club Team WRT | 11 | Ret | **Ret** | 1 | 5 | 3 | 5 | **27** | 17 | 16 | 40 |
| 8 | (United Kingdom) Ricky Collard (Germany) Marvin Kirchhöfer | (Switzerland) R-Motorsport | 7 | 5 | 4 | 13 | 7 | 18 | 7 | 1 | 10 | 19 | 39.5 |
| 9 | (Germany) Nico Bastian (France) Thomas Neubauer | (France) AKKA ASP Team | 1 | 8 | 20 | 6 | 9 | 12 | 24 | 18 | 7 | 8 | 29 |
| 10 | (South Africa) Kelvin van der Linde (Austria) Clemens Schmid | (Germany) Attempto Racing | 5 | 4 | 7 | 14 | 27 | 24 | 28 | 12 | 4 | 10 | 24.5 |
| 11 | (Germany) Christopher Mies | (Belgium) Belgian Audi Club Team WRT | 12 | 6 | | | 13 | 5 | 4 | 26 | 8 | 7 | 23 |
| 12 | (Argentina) Ezequiel Pérez Companc | (Belgium) Belgian Audi Club Team WRT | 11 | Ret | | | 5 | 3 | 5 | **27** | 17 | 16 | 22.5 |
| 13 | (Russia) Timur Boguslavskiy | (France) AKKA ASP Team | 15 | **18** | 5 | 26 | 26 | DNS | 10 | 10 | 13 | 5 | 14 |
| 14 | (Australia) Nick Foster (Netherlands) Steijn Schothorst | (Germany) Attempto Racing | Ret | 3 | 8 | 8 | 12 | 13 | 14 | 13 | 11 | 13 | 13.5 |
| 15 | (Switzerland) Hugo de Sadeleer (Finland) Aaro Vainio | (Switzerland) R-Motorsport | Ret | 11 | 17 | 7 | 6 | 8 | 15 | 14 | 9 | 9 | 11.5 |
| 16 | (United Kingdom) Finlay Hutchison (Belgium) Frédéric Vervisch | (Germany) Phoenix Racing | 8 | 12 | 10 | 5 | 8 | 10 | 13 | 25 | 18 | 20 | 11 |
| 17 | (Germany) Fabian Schiller | (France) AKKA ASP Team | 15 | **18** | 5 | 26 | | | 10 | 10 | | | 8 |
| 18 | (Netherlands) Milan Dontje (Italy) Mattia Drudi | (Germany) Attempto Racing | 10 | 9 | 9 | 18 | 16 | 9 | 6 | 15 | 12 | 15 | 8 |
| 19 | (Netherlands) Rik Breukers (Colombia) Óscar Tunjo | (Belgium) Belgian Audi Club Team WRT | 9 | Ret | 25 | 9 | 11 | 25 | 11 | 6 | 16 | 14 | 6.5 |
| 20 | (United Kingdom) Jack Hawksworth (France) Aurélien Panis | (France) Tech 1 Racing | | | | | 15 | Ret | 19 | 5 | 26 | 22 | 6 |
| 20 | (Brazil) Felipe Fraga | (France) AKKA ASP Team | | | | | 26 | DNS | | | 13 | 5 | 6 |
| 21 | (Australia) Shae Davies (United Kingdom) Tom Gamble | (Belgium) Belgian Audi Club Team WRT | 6 | Ret | 14 | 11 | 17 | 11 | 12 | 17 | 20 | 18 | 4.5 |
| 22 | (France) Steven Palette (Germany) Markus Winkelhock | (France) Saintéloc Racing | Ret | Ret | Ret | Ret | Ret | DNS | 18 | 7 | 19 | 12 | 3 |
| 23 | (Germany) Kim-Luis Schramm | (Germany) Phoenix Racing | Ret | 13 | 22 | 12 | 14 | 14 | 17 | 9 | 14 | 11 | 1 |
| 23 | (United Kingdom) Jamie Green | (Germany) Phoenix Racing | | | | | | | 17 | 9 | 14 | 11 | 1 |
| 24 | (Mexico) Diego Menchaca (United States) Taylor Proto | (China) Orange1 FFF Racing Team | 19 | DNS | 23 | 10 | 22 | 16 | 22 | 16 | 24 | 23 | 0.5 |
| | (Monaco) Stéphane Ortelli | (France) Saintéloc Racing | DNS | DNS | 13 | 19 | 21 | 21 | 16 | 11 | 15 | 17 | 0 |
| | (France) Dorian Boccolacci | (France) Saintéloc Racing | | | | | | | 16 | 11 | 15 | 17 | 0 |
| | (Italy) Andrea Bertolini (Belgium) Louis Machiels | (Italy) AF Corse | Ret | Ret | 11 | 21 | 20 | 19 | 23 | 19 | 23 | 26 | 0 |
| | (South Africa) David Perel (Russia) Rinat Salikhov | (Germany) Rinaldi Racing | 13 | 16 | 12 | 22 | 25 | 15 | 20 | 24 | 25 | Ret | 0 |
| | (Germany) Frank Stippler | (Germany) Phoenix Racing | Ret | 13 | 22 | 12 | | | | | | | 0 |
| | (France) Nyls Stievenart | (France) Saintéloc Racing | DNS | DNS | 13 | 19 | 21 | 21 | | | | | 0 |
| | (Japan) Hiroshi Hamaguchi (United Kingdom) Phil Keen | (China) Orange1 FFF Racing Team | 14 | 14 | 15 | 17 | 18 | 20 | 21 | 20 | 22 | 21 | 0 |
| | (France) Jean-Karl Vernay | (Germany) Phoenix Racing | | | | | 14 | 14 | | | | | 0 |
| | (France) Jim Pla | (France) AKKA ASP Team | 17 | 15 | 19 | 24 | 23 | 22 | 27 | 21 | 21 | 24 | 0 |
| | (France) Jean-Luc Beaubelique | (France) AKKA ASP Team | 17 | 15 | | | | | | | 21 | 24 | 0 |
| | (Italy) Andrea Fontana (Germany) Pierre Kaffer | (Italy) Audi Sport Italia | | | 16 | 20 | | | | | | | 0 |
| | (Germany) Florian Scholze (Germany) Wolfgang Triller | (Austria) HB Racing | 18 | 17 | 18 | 23 | 24 | 23 | 26 | 22 | 27 | 25 | 0 |
| | (Italy) Michele Beretta (Switzerland) Rolf Ineichen | (Austria) GRT Grasser Racing Team | | | | | 19 | 17 | | | | | 0 |
| | (Italy) Mauro Ricci | (France) AKKA ASP Team | | | 19 | 24 | 23 | 22 | 27 | 21 | | | 0 |
| | (Germany) Adam Osieka (Russia) Denis Remenyako | (Germany) GetSpeed Performance | | | 21 | 25 | | | | | | | 0 |
| | (United States) Stephen Earle (Finland) Rory Penttinen | (Switzerland) Kessel Racing | | | | | | | 25 | 23 | | | 0 |
| | (France) Pierre Feligioni (France) Claude-Yves Gosselin | (Belgium) Boutsen Ginion | | | 24 | 27 | | | | | | | 0 |
| | (Germany) Sven Müller (Italy) Giorgio Roda | (Italy) Dinamic Motorsport | | | | | | | | | 28 | 27 | 0 |
| Pos. | Driver | Team | BRH (United Kingdom) | | MIS (Italy) | | ZAN (Netherlands) | | NÜR (Germany) | | HUN (Hungary) | | Points |

Key
| Colour | Result |
|---|---|
| Gold | Race winner |
| Silver | 2nd place |
| Bronze | 3rd place |
| Green | Points finish |
| Blue | Non-points finish |
| Blue | Non-classified finish (NC) |
| Purple | Did not finish (Ret) |
| Black | Disqualified (DSQ) |
| Black | Excluded (EX) |
| White | Did not start (DNS) |
| White | Race cancelled (C) |
| White | Withdrew (WD) |
| Blank | Did not participate |

**Bold** – Pole
Italics – Fastest Lap

==== Silver Cup ====
| Pos. | Driver | Team | BRH (United Kingdom) | | MIS (Italy) | | ZAN (Netherlands) | | NÜR (Germany) | | HUN (Hungary) | | Points |
|---|---|---|---|---|---|---|---|---|---|---|---|---|---|
| 1 | (Germany) Nico Bastian (France) Thomas Neubauer | (France) AKKA ASP Team | **1** | 8 | **20** | 6 | 9 | 12 | 24 | 18 | **7** | 8 | 112.5 |
| 2 | (Switzerland) Hugo de Sadeleer (Finland) Aaro Vainio | (Switzerland) R-Motorsport | Ret | 11 | 17 | 7 | 6 | 8 | 15 | 14 | 9 | 9 | 99 |
| 3 | (Netherlands) Milan Dontje (Italy) Mattia Drudi | (Germany) Attempto Racing | 10 | 9 | 9 | 18 | 16 | **9** | **6** | 15 | 12 | 15 | 97 |
| 4 | (Russia) Timur Boguslavskiy | (France) AKKA ASP Team | 15 | **18** | 5 | **26** | **26** | DNS | 10 | 10 | 13 | **5** | 87 |
| 5 | (Netherlands) Rik Breukers (Colombia) Óscar Tunjo | (Belgium) Belgian Audi Club Team WRT | 9 | Ret | 25 | 9 | 11 | 25 | 11 | **6** | 16 | 14 | 75 |
| 6 | (Australia) Shae Davies (United Kingdom) Tom Gamble | (Belgium) Belgian Audi Club Team WRT | 6 | Ret | 14 | 11 | 17 | 11 | 12 | 17 | 20 | 18 | 64 |
| 7 | (Germany) Fabian Schiller | (France) AKKA ASP Team | 15 | **18** | 5 | **26** | | | 10 | 10 | | | 59 |
| 8 | (Mexico) Diego Menchaca (United States) Taylor Proto | (China) Orange1 FFF Racing Team | 19 | DNS | 23 | 10 | 22 | 16 | 22 | 16 | 24 | 23 | 42 |
| 9 | (Brazil) Felipe Fraga | (France) AKKA ASP Team | | | | | **26** | DNS | | | 13 | **5** | 28 |
| 10 | (Italy) Michele Beretta (Switzerland) Rolf Ineichen | (Austria) GRT Grasser Racing Team | | | | | 19 | 17 | | | | | 9 |
| Pos. | Driver | Team | BRH (United Kingdom) | | MIS (Italy) | | ZAN (Netherlands) | | NÜR (Germany) | | HUN (Hungary) | | Points |

==== Pro-Am Cup ====
| Pos. | Driver | Team | BRH (United Kingdom) | | MIS (Italy) | | ZAN (Netherlands) | | NÜR (Germany) | | HUN (Hungary) | | Points |
|---|---|---|---|---|---|---|---|---|---|---|---|---|---|
| 1 | (Japan) Hiroshi Hamaguchi (United Kingdom) Phil Keen | (China) Orange1 FFF Racing Team | 14 | 14 | 15 | 17 | 18 | 20 | 21 | 20 | 22 | 21 | 131 |
| 2 | (South Africa) David Perel (Russia) Rinat Salikhov | (Germany) Rinaldi Racing | 13 | 16 | 12 | 22 | 25 | 15 | **20** | **24** | **25** | Ret | 102.5 |
| 3 | (France) Jim Pla | (France) AKKA ASP Team | 17 | **15** | 19 | **24** | 23 | **22** | 27 | 21 | 21 | **24** | 96.5 |
| 4 | (Italy) Andrea Bertolini (Belgium) Louis Machiels | (Italy) AF Corse | **Ret** | Ret | 11 | 21 | 20 | 19 | 23 | 19 | 23 | 26 | 96 |
| 5 | (France) Jean-Luc Beaubelique | (France) AKKA ASP Team | 17 | **15** | | | | | | | 21 | **24** | 52 |
| 6 | (Italy) Mauro Ricci | (France) AKKA ASP Team | | | 19 | **24** | 23 | **22** | 27 | 21 | | | 44.5 |
| 7 | (Monaco) Stéphane Ortelli (France) Nyls Stievenart | (France) Saintéloc Racing | DNS | DNS | **13** | 19 | **21** | 21 | | | | | 40.5 |
| Pos. | Driver | Team | BRH (United Kingdom) | | MIS (Italy) | | ZAN (Netherlands) | | NÜR (Germany) | | HUN (Hungary) | | Points |

==== Am Cup ====
| Pos. | Driver | Team | BRH (United Kingdom) | | MIS (Italy) | | ZAN (Netherlands) | | NÜR (Germany) | | HUN (Hungary) | | Points |
|---|---|---|---|---|---|---|---|---|---|---|---|---|---|
| 1 | (Germany) Florian Scholze (Germany) Wolfgang Triller | (Austria) HB Racing | **18** | **17** | **18** | **23** | **24** | **23** | **26** | **22** | **27** | **25** | 170.5 |
| 2 | (United States) Stephen Earle (Finland) Rory Penttinen | (Switzerland) Kessel Racing | | | | | | | 25 | 23 | | | 28.5 |
| 3 | (Germany) Adam Osieka (Russia) Denis Remenyako | (Germany) GetSpeed Performance | | | 21 | 25 | | | | | | | 24 |
| 4 | (France) Pierre Feligioni (France) Claude-Yves Gosselin | (Belgium) Boutsen Ginion | | | 24 | 27 | | | | | | | 19 |
| Pos. | Driver | Team | BRH (United Kingdom) | | MIS (Italy) | | ZAN (Netherlands) | | NÜR (Germany) | | HUN (Hungary) | | Points |

=== Teams' championships ===
==== Overall ====
| Pos. | Team | Manufacturer | BRH (United Kingdom) | | MIS (Italy) | | ZAN (Netherlands) | | NÜR (Germany) | | HUN (Hungary) | | Points |
|---|---|---|---|---|---|---|---|---|---|---|---|---|---|
| 1 | (France) AKKA ASP Team | Mercedes-AMG | 1 | **8** | 2 | **6** | **1** | 6 | 9 | 18 | **1** | **1** | 99.5 |
| 2 | (China) Orange1 FFF Racing Team | Lamborghini | 14 | 2 | 1 | 2 | 3 | 7 | 1 | 3 | 5 | 4 | 95 |
| 3 | (Germany) Black Falcon | Mercedes-AMG | **2** | 1 | 3 | 4 | 4 | 4 | 8 | 4 | 2 | 3 | 93.5 |
| 4 | (Austria) GRT Grasser Racing Team | Lamborghini | 3 | 10 | 6 | 16 | 2 | 2 | **2** | 8 | 3 | 2 | 80 |
| 5 | (France) Saintéloc Racing | Audi | 16 | 7 | 13 | 3 | 10 | **1** | 3 | 2 | 6 | 6 | 66.5 |
| 6 | (Belgium) Belgian Audi Club Team WRT | Audi | 6 | 6 | **14** | 1 | 5 | 3 | 4 | **6** | 8 | 7 | 65.5 |
| 7 | (Switzerland) R-Motorsport | Aston Martin | 7 | 5 | 4 | 7 | 6 | 8 | 7 | 1 | 9 | 9 | 56 |
| 8 | (Germany) Attempto Racing | Audi | 5 | 3 | 7 | 8 | 12 | 9 | 6 | 12 | 4 | 10 | 42.5 |
| 9 | (Germany) Phoenix Racing | Audi | 8 | 12 | 10 | 5 | 8 | 10 | 13 | 9 | 14 | 11 | 22 |
| 10 | (France) Tech 1 Racing | Lexus | | | | | 15 | Ret | 19 | 5 | 26 | 22 | 7.5 |
| 11 | (Germany) Rinaldi Racing | Ferrari | 13 | 16 | 12 | 22 | 25 | 15 | 20 | 24 | 25 | Ret | 4 |
| 12 | (Italy) AF Corse | Ferrari | Ret | Ret | 11 | 21 | 20 | 19 | 23 | 19 | 23 | 26 | 2.5 |
| 13 | (Italy) Audi Sport Italia | Audi | | | 16 | 20 | | | | | | | 0.5 |
| | (Hong Kong) KCMG | Nissan | 18 | 17 | 18 | 23 | 24 | 23 | 26 | 22 | 27 | 25 | 0 |
| | (Germany) GetSpeed Performance | Mercedes-AMG | | | 21 | 25 | | | | | | | 0 |
| | (Switzerland) Kessel Racing | Ferrari | | | | | | | 25 | 23 | | | 0 |
| | (Belgium) Boutsen Ginion | Lamborghini | | | 24 | 27 | | | | | | | 0 |
| | (Italy) Dinamic Motorsport | Porsche | | | | | | | | | 28 | 27 | 0 |
| Pos. | Team | Manufacturer | BRH (United Kingdom) | | MIS (Italy) | | ZAN (Netherlands) | | NÜR (Germany) | | HUN (Hungary) | | Points |

Key
| Colour | Result |
|---|---|
| Gold | Race winner |
| Silver | 2nd place |
| Bronze | 3rd place |
| Green | Points finish |
| Blue | Non-points finish |
| Blue | Non-classified finish (NC) |
| Purple | Did not finish (Ret) |
| Black | Disqualified (DSQ) |
| Black | Excluded (EX) |
| White | Did not start (DNS) |
| White | Race cancelled (C) |
| White | Withdrew (WD) |
| Blank | Did not participate |

**Bold** – Pole
Italics – Fastest Lap

==== Silver Cup ====
| Pos. | Team | Manufacturer | BRH (United Kingdom) | | MIS (Italy) | | ZAN (Netherlands) | | NÜR (Germany) | | HUN (Hungary) | | Points |
|---|---|---|---|---|---|---|---|---|---|---|---|---|---|
| 1 | (France) AKKA ASP Team | Mercedes-AMG | **1** | **8** | **5** | **6** | **9** | 12 | 10 | 10 | **7** | **5** | 149.5 |
| 2 | (Switzerland) R-Motorsport | Aston Martin | Ret | 11 | 17 | 7 | 6 | 8 | 15 | 14 | 9 | 9 | 103 |
| 3 | (Germany) Attempto Racing | Audi | 10 | 9 | 9 | 18 | 16 | **9** | **6** | 15 | 12 | 15 | 102 |
| 4 | (Belgium) Belgian Audi Club Team WRT | Audi | 6 | Ret | 14 | 9 | 11 | 11 | 11 | **6** | 16 | 14 | 94 |
| 5 | (China) Orange1 FFF Racing Team | Lamborghini | 19 | DNS | 23 | 10 | 22 | 16 | 22 | 16 | 24 | 23 | 55.5 |
| 6 | (Austria) GRT Grasser Racing Team | Lamborghini | | | | | 19 | 17 | | | | | 10.5 |
| Pos. | Team | Manufacturer | BRH (United Kingdom) | | MIS (Italy) | | ZAN (Netherlands) | | NÜR (Germany) | | HUN (Hungary) | | Points |

==== Pro-Am Cup ====
| Pos. | Team | Manufacturer | BRH (United Kingdom) | | MIS (Italy) | | ZAN (Netherlands) | | NÜR (Germany) | | HUN (Hungary) | | Points |
|---|---|---|---|---|---|---|---|---|---|---|---|---|---|
| 1 | (China) Orange1 FFF Racing Team | Lamborghini | 14 | 14 | 15 | 17 | 18 | 20 | 21 | 20 | 22 | 21 | 131 |
| 2 | (Germany) Rinaldi Racing | Ferrari | 13 | 16 | 12 | 22 | 25 | 15 | **20** | **24** | **25** | Ret | 102.5 |
| 3 | (France) AKKA ASP Team | Mercedes-AMG | 17 | **15** | 19 | **24** | 23 | **22** | 27 | 21 | 21 | **24** | 96.5 |
| 4 | (Italy) AF Corse | Ferrari | **Ret** | Ret | 11 | 21 | 20 | 19 | 23 | 19 | 23 | 26 | 96 |
| 5 | (France) Saintéloc Racing | Audi | DNS | DNS | **13** | 19 | **21** | 21 | | | | | 40.5 |
| Pos. | Team | Manufacturer | BRH (United Kingdom) | | MIS (Italy) | | ZAN (Netherlands) | | NÜR (Germany) | | HUN (Hungary) | | Points |

==== Am Cup ====
| Pos. | Team | Manufacturer | BRH (United Kingdom) | | MIS (Italy) | | ZAN (Netherlands) | | NÜR (Germany) | | HUN (Hungary) | | Points |
|---|---|---|---|---|---|---|---|---|---|---|---|---|---|
| 1 | (Austria) HB Racing | Ferrari | **18** | **17** | **18** | **23** | **24** | **23** | **26** | **22** | **27** | **25** | 170.5 |
| 2 | (Switzerland) Kessel Racing | Ferrari | | | | | | | 25 | 23 | | | 28.5 |
| 3 | (Germany) GetSpeed Performance | Mercedes-AMG | | | 21 | 25 | | | | | | | 24 |
| 4 | (Belgium) Boutsen Ginion | Lamborghini | | | 24 | 27 | | | | | | | 19 |
| Pos. | Team | Manufacturer | BRH (United Kingdom) | | MIS (Italy) | | ZAN (Netherlands) | | NÜR (Germany) | | HUN (Hungary) | | Points |

== See also ==
- 2019 Blancpain GT Series
- 2019 Blancpain GT Series Endurance Cup
- 2019 Blancpain GT World Challenge America
- 2019 Blancpain GT World Challenge Asia
