= Nico Bastian =

German racing driver

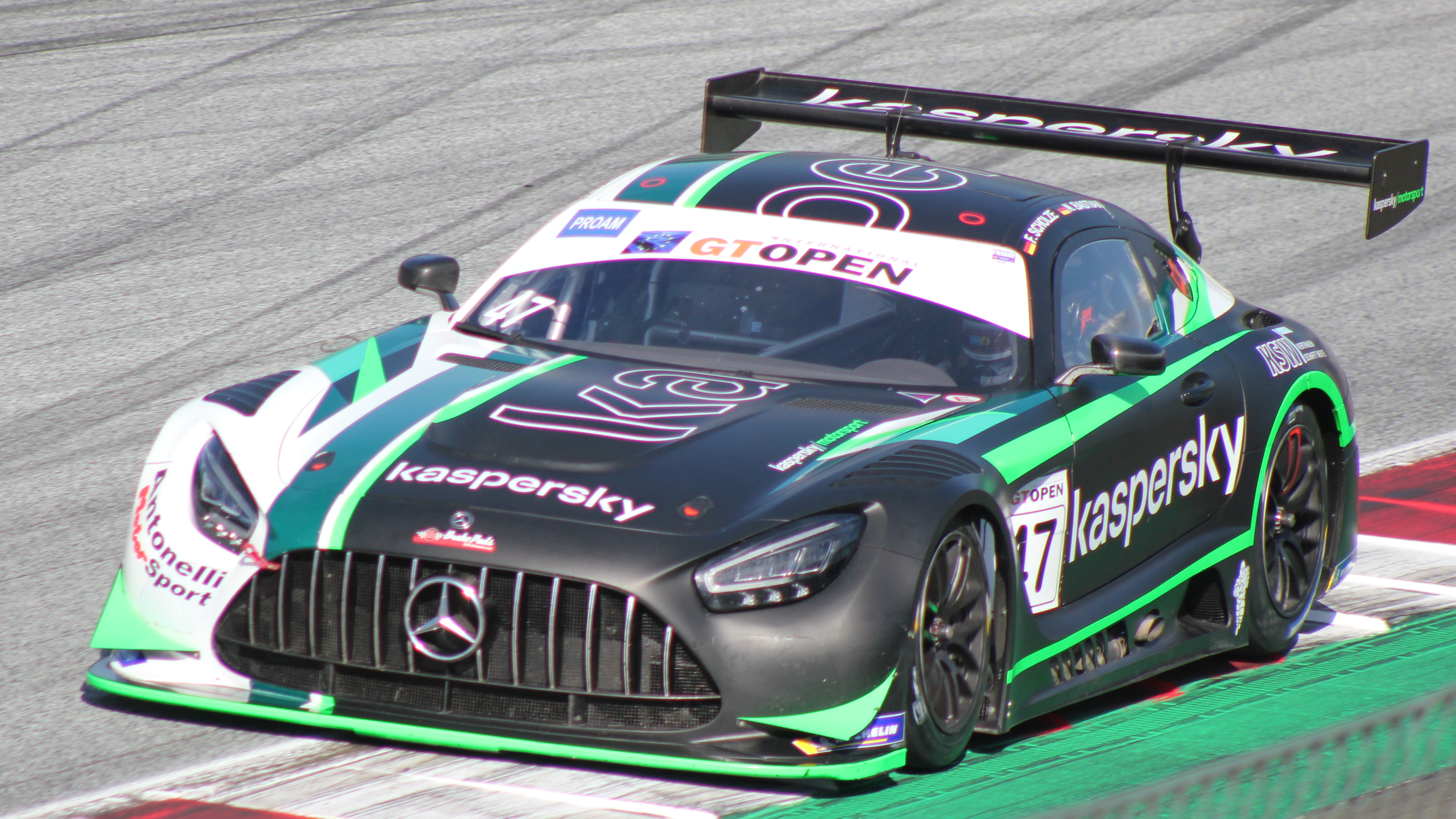
- Nationality: German
- Born: 15 April 1990 (age 36) Heidelberg, Baden-Württemberg

Blancpain GT Series Endurance Cup
- Categorisation: FIA Silver (until 2019, 2027–); FIA Gold (2020–2026)
- Years active: 2015, 2016, 2017–2019
- Teams: Rowe Racing; AKKA ASP, HRT
- Starts: 175
- Wins: 15
- Poles: 9
- Fastest laps: 16
- Best finish: 1st in 2019

Championship titles
- 2019 2018–2019 2011: Blancpain GT Series Endurance Cup - Silver; Blancpain GT Series Sprint Cup - Silver; Mini Challenge Germany

Nico Bastian (born 15 April 1990 in Heidelberg) is a racing driver from Germany. A long-standing Mercedes-AMG stalwart, he is a two-time Blancpain GT Series Silver Cup champion, and has twice finished in the overall podium at the Nürburgring 24 Hours.

== Racing record ==
=== Career summary ===
Season	Series	Team	Races	Wins	Poles	F/Laps	Podiums	Points	Position
2006	ADAC Volkswagen Polo Cup	N/A	9	0	0	0	0	132	13th
2007	ADAC Volkswagen Polo Cup	N/A	10	0	1	3	1	196	8th
2008	Mini Challenge Germany	Gigamot	8	1	1	0	1	118	14th
2008	SEAT Leon Supercopa Germany	Mobile Grafix by T.A.C. Race Solutions	4	0	0	0	0	13	19th
2009	Mini Challenge Germany	Die Agentour Racing	16	1	0	0	5	266	**3rd**
2010	Mini Challenge Germany	Die Agentour Racing	15	2	0	2	5	263	5th
2011	Mini Challenge Germany	Gigamot	14	4	2	9	11	344	**1st**
2011	24 Hours of Nürburgring - SP3T	MINI Motorsport	1	0	0	0	0	N/A	13th
2012	Blancpain Endurance Series - Pro-Am	DB Motorsport	1	0	0	0	0	0	NC
2012	24 Hours of Nürburgring - SP9	BMW Team Schubert	1	0	0	0	0	N/A	8th
2013	24 Hours of Nürburgring - SP9	Rowe Racing	1	0	0	0	1	N/A	**3rd**
2014	ADAC GT Masters	Rowe Racing	12	0	0	0	0	24	29th
2014	24 Hours of Nürburgring - SP9	Rowe Racing	1	0	0	0	1	N/A	**3rd**
2014	Blancpain Sprint Series	Fortec Motorsport	2	0	0	0	0	0	NC
2014	Blancpain Sprint Series - Silver	Fortec Motorsport	2	0	0	0	2	21	8th
2015	ADAC GT Masters	Rowe Racing	2	0	0	0	0	0	NC†
2015	Blancpain Endurance Series - Pro	Rowe Racing	5	0	0	0	0	48	6th
2015	24 Hours of Nürburgring - SP9	Rowe Racing	1	0	0	0	0	N/A	DNF
2015	24H Series - A6	HP Racing							
2016	GT Asia Series - GT3	Mercedes-AMG Driving Academy-Team AAI	2	0	0	0	0	?	?
2016	Intercontinental GT Challenge	Erebus Motorsport	1	0	0	0	0	12	12th
2017	Blancpain GT Series Endurance Cup	AKKA ASP	5	0	0	0	0	0	NC
2017	Blancpain GT Series Endurance Cup - Pro-Am	AKKA ASP	5	0	1	1	3	60	6th
2017	Intercontinental GT Challenge	AKKA ASP	1	0	0	0	0	0	NC
2018	Blancpain GT Series Endurance Cup	AKKA ASP Team	5	0	0	0	0	0	NC
2018	Blancpain GT Series Endurance Cup - Silver	AKKA ASP Team	5	0	0	1	2	49	5th
2018	Blancpain GT Series Sprint Cup	AKKA ASP Team	10	0	1	1	0	10.5	18th
2018	Blancpain GT Series Sprint Cup - Silver	AKKA ASP Team	10	1	3	3	7	108.5	**1st**
2018	Blancpain GT Series Asia - GT3	GruppeM Racing Team	8	2	1	1	2	73	10th
2018	24 Hours of Nürburgring - SP9	Black Falcon	1	0	0	0	0	N/A	4th
2018	FIA GT Nations Cup	Team Germany	1	0	0	0	0	N/A	DNF
2019	Blancpain GT Series Endurance Cup	AKKA ASP Team	5	0	0	0	0	23	11th
2019	Blancpain GT Series Endurance Cup - Silver	AKKA ASP Team	5	3	2	1	5	142	**1st**
2019	Blancpain GT Series Sprint Cup	AKKA ASP Team	10	1	0	0	1	29	9th
2019	Blancpain GT Series Sprint Cup - Silver	AKKA ASP Team	10	4	3	1	6	112.5	**1st**
2019	Intercontinental GT Challenge	SunEnergy1 Racing	1	0	0	0	0	0	NC†
2019	24 Hours of Nürburgring - SP9	Mercedes-AMG Team Black Falcon	1	0	0	0	0	N/A	DNF
2020	GT World Challenge Europe Endurance Cup	SPS Automotive Performance	2	0	0	0	0	0	NC
2020	GT World Challenge Europe Endurance Cup - Pro-Am	SPS Automotive Performance	2	0	0	0	0	2	27th
2020	International GT Open	HTP-Winward Motorsport	2	0	0	0	0	9	20th
2020	Michelin Pilot Challenge - GS	Winward Racing/HTP Motorsport	2	0	0	0	0	54	35th
2020	24 Hours of Nürburgring - SP9	Mercedes-AMG Team HRT Bilstein	1	0	0	0	0	N/A	9th
2021	GT World Challenge Europe Endurance Cup	GetSpeed Performance	3	0	0	0	0	25	12th
2021	GT World Challenge Europe Endurance Cup	BWT Haupt Racing Team	2	0	0	0	1	25	12th
2021	GT World Challenge Europe Endurance Cup - Pro-Am	GetSpeed Performance	3	0	0	1	0	18	21st
2021	International GT Open	Winward Motorsport	2	0	1	0	0	21	18th
2021	International GT Open	AKM Motorsport	2	0	0	0	1	21	18th
2021	24H GT Series - GT3-Am	Team HRT Abu Dhabi Racing	1	1	0	1	1	0	NC
2021	24 Hours of Nürburgring - SP9	Mercedes-AMG Team HRT	1	0	0	0	0	N/A	DNF
2022	24 Hours of Nürburgring - SP9 Pro-Am	Mercedes-AMG Team Bilstein by HRT	1	1	0	0	1	N/A	**1st**
2023	ADAC GT Masters	Team Joos by RACEmotion	2	0	0	0	0	7	28th
2024	Nürburgring Langstrecken-Serie - SP9	PROsport Racing	3	0	0	0	1	0	NC†
2024	Nürburgring Langstrecken-Serie - SP9	Scherer Sport PHX	1	0	0	0	1	0	NC†
2024	24 Hours of Nürburgring - SP9	PROsport Racing	1	0	0	0	0	N/A	DNF
2025	Nürburgring Langstrecken-Serie - SP9	HRT Ford Performance	0	0	0	0	0	0	NC†
2025	Nürburgring Langstrecken-Serie - SP9 Pro-Am	PROsport Racing	1	0	0	0	0	0	NC†
2025	24 Hours of Nürburgring - SP9 Pro-Am	PROsport Racing	1	0	0	0	1	N/A	**2nd**
2025	24H Series - GT3	TFT Racing	1	0	0	0	1	0	NC
2025	Gulf 12 Hours - Pro-Am	TFT Racing	1	0	0	0	1	N/A	4th
2026	Nürburgring Langstrecken-Serie - Cup2	Mühlner Motorsport							
2026	Nürburgring Langstrecken-Serie - TCR	Hyundai Motorsport N							
2026	24 Hours of Nürburgring - TCR	Hyundai Motorsport N	1	1	1	0	1	N/A	**1st**

† As he was a guest driver, Bastian was ineligible to score points.

=== Complete GT World Challenge Europe results ===
==== GT World Challenge Europe Endurance Cup ====
(key) (Races in bold indicate pole position) (Races in italics indicate fastest lap)

Year	Team	Car	Class	1	2	3	4	5	6	7	8	Pos.	Points
2012	DB Motorsport	BMW Z4 GT3	Pro	MNZ	SIL	LEC	SPA; 6H	SPA; 12H	SPA; 24H	NÜR; Ret	NAV	NC	0
2015	Rowe Racing	Mercedes-Benz SLS AMG GT3	Pro	MNZ; 11	SIL; 10	LEC; 4	SPA; 6H; 1	SPA; 12H; 1	SPA; 24H; 16	NÜR; 19		6th	48
2017	AKKA ASP	Mercedes-AMG GT3	Pro-Am	MNZ; 17	**SIL**; 22	LEC; 15	SPA; 6H; 56	SPA; 12H; 50	SPA; 24H; Ret	CAT; 21		6th	60
2018	AKKA ASP Team	Mercedes-AMG GT3	Silver	MON; 12	SIL; Ret	LEC; 27	SPA; 6H; 39	SPA; 12H; 30	SPA; 24H; Ret	CAT; 16		5th	49
2019	AKKA ASP Team	Mercedes-AMG GT3	Silver	**MNZ**; 4	SIL; 10	LEC; 11	SPA; 6H; 14	SPA; 12H; 14	SPA; 24H; 17	**CAT**; 5		1st	142
2020	SPS Automotive Performance	Mercedes-AMG GT3 Evo	Pro-Am	IMO; Ret	NÜR; 30	SPA; 6H	SPA; 12H	SPA; 24H	LEC			27th	2
2021	GetSpeed Performance	Mercedes-AMG GT3 Evo	Pro-Am	MNZ; 25	LEC; Ret	SPA; 6H; 39	SPA; 12H; 28	SPA; 24H; Ret				21st	18
2021	BWT Haupt Racing Team	Mercedes-AMG GT3 Evo	Pro						NÜR; 3	CAT; 5		12th	25

==== GT World Challenge Europe Sprint Cup ====
(key) (Races in bold indicate pole position) (Races in italics indicate fastest lap)

Year	Team	Car	Class	1	2	3	4	5	6	7	8	9	10	11	12	13	14	Pos.	Points
2014	Fortec Motorsport	Mercedes-Benz SLS AMG GT3	Silver	NOG; QR; 13	NOG; CR; 12	BRH; QR	BRH; CR	ZAN; QR	ZAN; CR	SVK; QR	SVK; CR	ALG; QR	ALG; CR	ZOL; QR	ZOL; CR	BAK; QR	BAK; CR	8th	21
2018	AKKA ASP Team	Mercedes-AMG GT3	Silver	ZOL; 1; 11	ZOL; 2; 9	**BRH**; **1**; 19	**BRH**; **2**; 15	MIS; 1; 6	MIS; 2; 15	**HUN**; **1**; 7	HUN; 2; 9	**NÜR**; **1**; 16	NÜR; 2; 17					1st	108.5
2019	AKKA ASP Team	Mercedes-AMG GT3	Silver	**BRH**; **1**; 1	BRH; 2; 8	**MIS**; **1**; 20	MIS; 2; 6	ZAN; 1; 9	ZAN; 2; 12	NÜR; 1; 24	NÜR; 2; 18	**HUN**; **1**; 7	HUN; 2; 8					1st	112.5

Sporting positions
Preceded by Inaugural	Blancpain GT Series; Silver Cup Champion; 2018-2019; With: Jack Manchester (2018)	Succeeded by Ezequiel Pérez Companc (GT World Challenge Europe)
Preceded by Jules Szymkowiak; Fabian Schiller	Blancpain GT Series Sprint Cup/Blancpain GT World Challenge Europe; Silver Cup Champion; 2018-2019; With: Jack Manchester (2018) & Thomas Neubauer (2019)	Succeeded by Simon Gachet; Steven Palette (GT World Challenge Europe Sprint Cup)
Preceded by Alex Fontana; Mikaël Grenier; Adrian Zaugg	Blancpain GT Series Endurance Cup; Silver Cup Champion; 2019; With: Timur Boguslavskiy & Felipe Fraga	Succeeded by Alex MacDowall; Patrick Kujala; Frederik Schandorff (GT World Challenge Europe Endurance Cup)
