= 2018 Blancpain GT Series =

2018 sports car racing series

The 2018 Blancpain GT Series was the fifth season of the Blancpain GT Series. The season began on 7 April at Zolder and ended on 30 September in Barcelona. The season featured ten rounds, five Endurance Cup rounds and five Sprint Cup rounds.

== Calendar ==
At the annual press conference during the 2017 24 Hours of Spa on 28 July, the Stéphane Ratel Organisation announced the first draft of the 2018 calendar. Zolder became the season opener instead of Misano. On 17 September 2017, it was announced the race at Silverstone was moved a week to avoid a clash with the Nürburgring 24 Hours. On 9 October 2017, the finalised calendar was announced, confirming the dates of the races at the Hungaroring.

Race format

In previous years a Sprint race weekend consisted of one Qualifying session, one Qualifying Race - of which the results set up the grid for the Main Race - and one Main Race. On 2 October 2017, changes to the format of Sprint race weekends were announced. In 2018 a Sprint race weekend consisted of two races scoring equal points and featuring separate Qualifying sessions for each race.

Round	Circuit	Date	Series	Report
1	Circuit Zolder, Heusden-Zolder, Belgium	7–8 April	Sprint	Report
2	Autodromo Nazionale Monza, Monza, Italy	22 April	Endurance	Report
3	(United Kingdom) Brands Hatch, Kent, Great Britain	5–6 May	Sprint	Report
4	(United Kingdom) Silverstone Circuit, Silverstone, Great Britain	20 May	Endurance	Report
5	Circuit Paul Ricard, Le Castellet, France	2 June	Endurance	Report
6	Misano World Circuit Marco Simoncelli, Misano Adriatico, Italy	23–24 June	Sprint	Report
7	Circuit de Spa-Francorchamps, Stavelot, Belgium	28–29 July	Endurance	Report
8	Hungaroring, Mogyoród, Hungary	1–2 September	Sprint	Report
9	Nürburgring, Nürburg, Germany	15–16 September	Sprint	Report
10	Circuit de Barcelona-Catalunya, Montmeló, Spain	30 September	Endurance	Report

== Race results ==
Bold indicates overall winner.

Round		Circuit	Pole position	Pro Winners	Silver Winners	Pro-Am Winners	Am Winners
1	R1	(Belgium) Zolder	(Belgium) No. 2 Belgian Audi Club Team WRT	(Austria) **No. 63 GRT Grasser Racing Team**	(Belgium) No. 3 Belgian Audi Club Team WRT	(Thailand) No. 39 TP 12 - Kessel Racing	(Belgium) No. 15 Boutsen Ginion Racing
1	R1	(Belgium) Zolder	(United Kingdom) Will Stevens (Belgium) Dries Vanthoor	(Italy) **Mirko Bortolotti** (Germany) **Christian Engelhart**	(Belgium) Gilles Magnus (Belgium) Alessio Picariello	(Thailand) Piti Bhirombhakdi (Netherlands) Carlo van Dam	(France) Pierre Feligioni (France) Claude-Yves Gosselin
1	R2	(Belgium) Zolder	(Austria) No. 63 GRT Grasser Racing Team	(Germany) **No. 66 Attempto Racing**	(Belgium) No. 3 Belgian Audi Club Team WRT	(Thailand) No. 39 TP 12 - Kessel Racing	(Belgium) No. 15 Boutsen Ginion Racing
1	R2	(Belgium) Zolder	(Italy) Mirko Bortolotti (Germany) Christian Engelhart	(South Africa) **Kelvin van der Linde** (Netherlands) **Steijn Schothorst**	(Belgium) Gilles Magnus (Belgium) Alessio Picariello	(Thailand) Piti Bhirombhakdi (Netherlands) Carlo van Dam	(France) Pierre Feligioni (France) Claude-Yves Gosselin
2		(Italy) Monza	(Russia) No. 72 SMP Racing	(Belgium) **No. 1 Belgian Audi Club Team WRT**	(Switzerland) No. 54 Emil Frey Jaguar Racing	(Germany) No. 333 Rinaldi Racing	(France) No. 89 AKKA ASP Team
2		(Italy) Monza	(Russia) Mikhail Aleshin (Spain) Miguel Molina (Italy) Davide Rigon	(Germany) **Christopher Mies** (Spain) **Alex Riberas** (Belgium) **Dries Vanthoor**	(Switzerland) Alex Fontana (Canada) Mikaël Grenier (Switzerland) Adrian Zaugg	(Germany) Alexander Mattschull (Russia) Rinat Salikhov (Germany) Dominik Schwager	(France) Fabien Barthez (France) Eric Debard (Switzerland) Philippe Giauque
3	R1	(United Kingdom) Brands Hatch	(Belgium) No. 2 Belgian Audi Club Team WRT	(Belgium) **No. 2 Belgian Audi Club Team WRT**	(United Kingdom) No. 31 Team Parker Racing	(Thailand) No. 39 TP 12 - Kessel Racing	No entries
3	R1	(United Kingdom) Brands Hatch	(United Kingdom) Will Stevens (Belgium) Dries Vanthoor	(United Kingdom) **Will Stevens** (Belgium) **Dries Vanthoor**	(United Kingdom) Josh Caygill (Republic of Ireland) Árón Taylor-Smith	(Thailand) Piti Bhirombhakdi (Netherlands) Carlo van Dam	No entries
3	R2	(United Kingdom) Brands Hatch	(Belgium) No. 17 Belgian Audi Club Team WRT	(Belgium) **No. 17 Belgian Audi Club Team WRT**	(France) No. 37 3Y Technology	(France) No. 26 Saintéloc Racing	No entries
3	R2	(United Kingdom) Brands Hatch	(United Kingdom) Stuart Leonard (Belgium) Frédéric Vervisch	(United Kingdom) **Stuart Leonard** (Belgium) **Frédéric Vervisch**	(Brazil) Lukas Moraes (United Kingdom) Andrew Watson	(France) Nyls Stievenart (Germany) Markus Winkelhock	No entries
4		(United Kingdom) Silverstone	(Switzerland) No. 76 R-Motorsport	(Switzerland) **No. 76 R-Motorsport**	(Germany) No. 6 Black Falcon	(United Kingdom) No. 49 Ram Racing	(United Kingdom) No. 188 Garage 59
4		(United Kingdom) Silverstone	(United Kingdom) Jake Dennis (Denmark) Nicki Thiim (France) Matthieu Vaxivière	(United Kingdom) **Jake Dennis** (Denmark) **Nicki Thiim** (France) **Matthieu Vaxivière**	(Saudi Arabia) Abdulaziz Al Faisal (Germany) Hubert Haupt (Italy) Gabriele Piana	(United Kingdom) Darren Burke (United Kingdom) Euan Hankey (Turkey) Salih Yoluç	(United Kingdom) Chris Goodwin (United Kingdom) Chris Harris (Sweden) Alexander West
5		(France) Paul Ricard	(Switzerland) No. 76 R-Motorsport	(Switzerland) **No. 14 Emil Frey Lexus Racing**	(United Kingdom) No. 78 Barwell Motorsport	(Italy) No. 51 AF Corse	(United Kingdom) No. 188 Garage 59
5		(France) Paul Ricard	(United Kingdom) Jake Dennis (Denmark) Nicki Thiim (France) Matthieu Vaxivière	(Spain) **Albert Costa** (Austria) **Christian Klien** (Germany) **Marco Seefried**	(Italy) Michele Beretta (Croatia) Martin Kodrić (United Kingdom) Sandy Mitchell	(United Kingdom) Duncan Cameron (Republic of Ireland) Matt Griffin (Italy) Gianluca de Lorenzi	(United Kingdom) Chris Goodwin (United Kingdom) Chris Harris (Sweden) Alexander West
6	R1	(Italy) Misano	(France) No. 87 AKKA ASP Team	(Belgium) **No. 1 Belgian Audi Club Team WRT**	(France) No. 90 AKKA ASP Team	(France) No. 26 Saintéloc Racing	No entries
6	R1	(Italy) Misano	(Russia) Denis Bulatov (France) Nico Jamin	(Germany) **Christopher Mies** (Spain) **Alex Riberas**	(Germany) Nico Bastian (United Kingdom) Jack Manchester	(France) Nyls Stievenart (Germany) Markus Winkelhock	No entries
6	R2	(Italy) Misano	(France) No. 88 AKKA ASP Team	(Belgium) **No. 1 Belgian Audi Club Team WRT**	(France) No. 87 AKKA ASP Team	(France) No. 26 Saintéloc Racing	No entries
6	R2	(Italy) Misano	(Italy) Raffaele Marciello (United Kingdom) Michael Meadows	(Germany) **Christopher Mies** (Spain) **Alex Riberas**	(Russia) Denis Bulatov (France) Nico Jamin	(France) Nyls Stievenart (Germany) Markus Winkelhock	No entries
7		(Belgium) Spa-Francorchamps	(Switzerland) No. 62 R-Motorsport	(Germany) **No. 34 Walkenhorst Motorsport**	(Italy) No. 12 Ombra Racing	(Germany) No. 333 Rinaldi Racing	(United Kingdom) No. 77 Barwell Motorsport
7		(Belgium) Spa-Francorchamps	(Austria) Dominik Baumann (Germany) Marvin Kirchhöfer (Belgium) Maxime Martin	(United Kingdom) **Tom Blomqvist** (Austria) **Philipp Eng** (Norway) **Christian Krognes**	(Italy) Alex Frassineti (China) Kang Ling (France) Romain Monti (Italy) Andrea Rizzoli	(Germany) Daniel Keilwitz (Germany) Alexander Mattschull (South Africa) David Perel (Russia) Rinat Salikhov	(United Kingdom) Richard Abra (Switzerland) Adrian Amstutz (Finland) Patrick Kujala (Russia) Leo Machitski
8	R1	(Hungary) Hungaroring	(France) No. 90 AKKA ASP Team	(Austria) **No. 63 GRT Grasser Racing Team**	(France) No. 87 AKKA ASP Team	(France) No. 751 SunEnergy1 Racing	No entries
8	R1	(Hungary) Hungaroring	(Germany) Nico Bastian (United Kingdom) Jack Manchester	(Italy) **Mirko Bortolotti** (Germany) **Christian Engelhart**	(Russia) Denis Bulatov (France) Nico Jamin	(Australia) Kenny Habul (France) Tristan Vautier	No entries
8	R2	(Hungary) Hungaroring	(France) No. 88 AKKA ASP Team	(France) **No. 88 AKKA ASP Team**	(France) No. 87 AKKA ASP Team	(France) No. 26 Saintéloc Racing	No entries
8	R2	(Hungary) Hungaroring	(Italy) Raffaele Marciello (United Kingdom) Michael Meadows	(Italy) **Raffaele Marciello** (United Kingdom) **Michael Meadows**	(Russia) Denis Bulatov (France) Nico Jamin	(France) Nyls Stievenart (Germany) Markus Winkelhock	No entries
9	R1	(Germany) Nürburgring	(Austria) No. 63 GRT Grasser Racing Team	(Belgium) **No. 1 Belgian Audi Club Team WRT**	(Belgium) No. 3 Belgian Audi Club Team WRT	(France) No. 26 Saintéloc Racing	No entries
9	R1	(Germany) Nürburgring	(Italy) Mirko Bortolotti (Germany) Christian Engelhart	(Germany) **Christopher Mies** (Spain) **Alex Riberas**	(Switzerland) Ricardo Feller (Belgium) Adrien De Leener	(France) Nyls Stievenart (Germany) Markus Winkelhock	No entries
9	R2	(Germany) Nürburgring	(Germany) No. 6 Black Falcon	(France) **No. 88 AKKA ASP Team**	(Germany) No. 6 Black Falcon	(Germany) No. 333 Rinaldi Racing	No entries
9	R2	(Germany) Nürburgring	(Germany) Hubert Haupt (Germany) Luca Stolz	(Italy) **Raffaele Marciello** (United Kingdom) **Michael Meadows**	(Germany) Hubert Haupt (Germany) Luca Stolz	(South Africa) David Perel (Russia) Rinat Salikhov	No entries
10		(Spain) Barcelona-Catalunya	(Germany) No. 4 Mercedes-AMG Team Black Falcon	(Germany) **No. 4 Mercedes-AMG Team Black Falcon**	(Switzerland) No. 54 Emil Frey Jaguar Racing	(Italy) No. 27 Daiko Lazarus Racing	(United Kingdom) No. 77 Barwell Motorsport
10		(Spain) Barcelona-Catalunya	(Netherlands) Yelmer Buurman (Germany) Maro Engel (Germany) Luca Stolz	(Netherlands) **Yelmer Buurman** (Germany) **Maro Engel** (Germany) **Luca Stolz**	(Switzerland) Alex Fontana (Canada) Mikaël Grenier (Switzerland) Adrian Zaugg	(Italy) Giuseppe Cipriani (Italy) Fabrizio Crestani (Portugal) Miguel Ramos	(United Kingdom) Richard Abra (Switzerland) Adrian Amstutz (Russia) Leo Machitski

== Championship standings ==
Scoring system

Championship points were awarded for the first ten positions in each race. The pole-sitter also received one point and entries were required to complete 75% of the winning car's race distance in order to be classified and earn points. Individual drivers were required to participate for a minimum of 25 minutes in order to earn championship points in any race. A new points system was introduced in the Sprint Cup this season. It takes the maximum points an entry could earn in the old 'Qualifying Race + Main Race'-format divided by two.

Sprint Cup Race points

Position	**1st**	**2nd**	**3rd**	**4th**	**5th**	**6th**	**7th**	**8th**	**9th**	**10th**	**Pole**
Points	16.5	12	9.5	7.5	6	4.5	3	2	1	0.5	1

Endurance Cup Race points

Position	**1st**	**2nd**	**3rd**	**4th**	**5th**	**6th**	**7th**	**8th**	**9th**	**10th**	**Pole**
Points	25	18	15	12	10	8	6	4	2	1	1

1000 km Paul Ricard points

Position	**1st**	**2nd**	**3rd**	**4th**	**5th**	**6th**	**7th**	**8th**	**9th**	**10th**	**Pole**
Points	33	24	19	15	12	9	6	4	2	1	1

24 Hours of Spa points

Points were awarded after six hours, after twelve hours and at the finish.

Position	**1st**	**2nd**	**3rd**	**4th**	**5th**	**6th**	**7th**	**8th**	**9th**	**10th**	**Pole**
Points after 6hrs/12hrs	12	9	7	6	5	4	3	2	1	0	1
Points at the finish	25	18	15	12	10	8	6	4	2	1	1

=== Drivers' championships ===
==== Overall ====
Pos.	Driver	Team	ZOL (Belgium)		MNZ (Italy)	BRH (United Kingdom)		SIL (United Kingdom)	LEC (France)	MIS (Italy)		SPA (Belgium)			HUN (Hungary)		NÜR (Germany)		CAT (Spain)	Points
Pos.	Driver	Team	ZOL (Belgium)		MNZ (Italy)	BRH (United Kingdom)		SIL (United Kingdom)	LEC (France)	MIS (Italy)		6hrs	12hrs	24hrs	HUN (Hungary)		NÜR (Germany)		CAT (Spain)	Points
1	(Italy) Raffaele Marciello	(France) AKKA ASP Team	8	2		3	4			2	**10**				2	**1**	4	1		164
1	(Italy) Raffaele Marciello	(France) Mercedes-AMG Team AKKA ASP			11			2	4			15	3	6					2	164
2	(Germany) Christopher Mies (Spain) Alex Riberas	(Belgium) Belgian Audi Club Team WRT	3	Ret	1	2	2	4	Ret	1	1				Ret	4	1	16	15	127.5
2	(Germany) Christopher Mies (Spain) Alex Riberas	(Belgium) Audi Sport Team WRT										24	15	40						127.5
3	(United Kingdom) Michael Meadows	(France) AKKA ASP Team	8	2		3	4			2	**10**				2	**1**	4	1		104
3	(United Kingdom) Michael Meadows	(Russia) SMP Racing by AKKA ASP			Ret			Ret	7			36	23	16					14	104
4	(South Africa) Kelvin van der Linde	(Germany) Attempto Racing	4	1	6	8	3	19	Ret	Ret	4				10	3	6	4	DNS	101
4	(South Africa) Kelvin van der Linde	(Germany) Montaplast by Land-Motorsport										1	9	3						101
5	(Belgium) Dries Vanthoor	(Belgium) Belgian Audi Club Team WRT	**2**	11	1	**1**	Ret	4	Ret	Ret	2				5	7	2	Ret	15	100.5
5	(Belgium) Dries Vanthoor	(Belgium) Audi Sport Team WRT										24	15	40						100.5
6	(Germany) Luca Stolz	(Germany) (Mercedes-AMG Team) Black Falcon			3			6	Ret			5	2	5	9	12	15	**2**	**1**	87
7	(Netherlands) Yelmer Buurman (Germany) Maro Engel	(Germany) Mercedes-AMG Team Black Falcon			3			6	Ret			5	2	5					**1**	73
8	(Netherlands) Steijn Schothorst	(Germany) Attempto Racing	4	1	6	8	3	19	Ret	Ret	4	20	18	44	10	3	6	4	DNS	73
9	(Germany) Christopher Haase	(France) Saintéloc Racing	10	12	14	7	8	Ret	6	Ret	3				4	2	10	3	45	71.5
9	(Germany) Christopher Haase	(France) Audi Sport Team Saintéloc										16	4	4						71.5
10	(Italy) Mirko Bortolotti (Germany) Christian Engelhart	(Austria) GRT Grasser Racing Team	1	**7**	4	10	5	10	13	3	18	55	59	Ret	1	6	**DSQ**	EX	13	70.5
11	(United Kingdom) Will Stevens	(Belgium) Belgian Audi Club Team WRT	**2**	11		**1**	Ret			Ret	2				5	7	2	Ret		63.5
12	(France) Simon Gachet	(France) Saintéloc Racing	10	12	14	7	8	Ret	6	Ret	3	63	63	Ret	4	2	10	3	45	53.5
13	(France) Tristan Vautier	(France) Mercedes-AMG Team AKKA ASP			11			2				15	3	6	15	DNS			2	51
14	(United Kingdom) Stuart Leonard	(Belgium) Belgian Audi Club Team WRT	5	5	7	4	**1**	12	12	8	6	60	60	Ret	Ret	16	11	9	Ret	50.5
15	(Spain) Albert Costa (Austria) Christian Klien	(Switzerland) Emil Frey Lexus Racing	Ret	20	17	11	14	9	1	9	Ret	31	20	13	6	13	5	7	Ret	50.5
16	(Italy) Andrea Caldarelli	(Austria) GRT Grasser Racing Team	6	3	4	12	Ret	10	13	4	20	55	59	Ret	16	11	3	5	13	50
17	(Austria) Philipp Eng	(Germany) Walkenhorst Motorsport										4	1	1						47
17	(Austria) Philipp Eng	(Germany) Rowe Racing																	8	47
18	(United Kingdom) Tom Blomqvist	(Germany) Rowe Racing							11										9	45
18	(United Kingdom) Tom Blomqvist	(Germany) Walkenhorst Motorsport										4	1	1						45
19	(Argentina) Ezequiel Pérez Companc	(Austria) GRT Grasser Racing Team	6	3	Ret	12	Ret	30	17	4	20	19	19	14	16	11	3	5	6	45
20	(France) Nico Jamin	(France) AKKA ASP Team	9	4	36	5	6	37	Ret	**Ret**	5	62	62	Ret	3	8	7	6	Ret	45
21	(Norway) Christian Krognes	(Germany) Walkenhorst Motorsport										4	1	1						43
22	(Belgium) Frédéric Vervisch	(Belgium) Belgian Audi Club Team WRT				4	**1**		12											43
22	(Belgium) Frédéric Vervisch	(France) Audi Sport Team Saintéloc										16	4	4						43
23	(South Africa) Sheldon van der Linde	(Belgium) Belgian Audi Club Team WRT			7			12	12	8	6								Ret	40.5
23	(South Africa) Sheldon van der Linde	(Germany) Montaplast by Land-Motorsport										1	9	3						40.5
24	(United Kingdom) Adam Christodoulou	(France) Mercedes-AMG Team AKKA ASP						2	4								7	6		40.5
25	(Germany) Marco Seefried	(Switzerland) Emil Frey Lexus Racing			17			9	1			31	20	13					Ret	35
26	(Spain) Daniel Juncadella	(France) Mercedes-AMG Team AKKA ASP			11							15	3	6					2	33
27	(United Kingdom) Jake Dennis (Denmark) Nicki Thiim (France) Matthieu Vaxivière	(Switzerland) R-Motorsport			Ret			**1**	**31**			13	11	9					40	29
28	(France) Jules Gounon (United Kingdom) Steven Kane	(United Kingdom) Bentley Team M-Sport			24			21	2			11	5	25					21	29
28	(South Africa) Jordan Pepper	(United Kingdom) Bentley Team M-Sport							2			11	5	25					21	29
29	(United Kingdom) Alexander Sims	(Germany) Rowe Racing			Ret							7	6	2					8	29
30	(Switzerland) Jeffrey Schmidt	(Germany) Attempto Racing			13			22	Ret											28
30	(Switzerland) Jeffrey Schmidt	(Germany) Montaplast by Land-Motorsport										1	9	3						28
31	(Austria) Norbert Siedler	(Switzerland) Emil Frey Lexus Racing	14	13	21	9	9	3	35	5	8	28	53	Ret	11	14	9	8	Ret	28
32	(Germany) Markus Winkelhock	(France) Saintéloc Racing	15	15	27	17	11	35	6	11	9				18	19	12	15	24	28
32	(Germany) Markus Winkelhock	(France) Audi Sport Team Saintéloc										16	4	4						28
33	(Netherlands) Nick Catsburg	(Germany) Rowe Racing			Ret							7	6	2					9	27
33	(Germany) Jens Klingmann	(Germany) Rowe Racing			Ret			13	11			7	6	2					9	27
34	(Netherlands) Robin Frijns	(Belgium) Belgian Audi Club Team WRT	5	5	7										Ret	16	11	9		27
34	(Netherlands) Robin Frijns	(Belgium) Audi Sport Team WRT										6	10	8						27
35	(Monaco) Stéphane Ortelli	(Switzerland) Emil Frey Lexus Racing	14	13	21	9	9	3	35	5	8	28	53	Ret					Ret	25
36	(Switzerland) Alex Fontana (Canada) Mikaël Grenier	(Switzerland) Emil Frey Jaguar Racing			5			44	16	7	11	29	35	28					4	25
37	(Russia) Denis Bulatov	(Russia) SMP Racing by AKKA ASP			Ret			Ret	7			36	23	16					14	24.5
37	(Russia) Denis Bulatov	(France) AKKA ASP Team								**Ret**	5				3	8				24.5
38	(Germany) Maximilian Buhk (Germany) Maximilian Götz	(United Kingdom) Strakka Racing			2			8	9											24
38	(Germany) Maximilian Buhk (Germany) Maximilian Götz	(United Kingdom) Mercedes-AMG Team Strakka Racing										21	12	11					17	24
39	(Russia) Mikhail Aleshin (Spain) Miguel Molina (Italy) Davide Rigon	(Russia) SMP Racing			**44**			7	33			22	14	10					3	23
40	(Switzerland) Adrian Zaugg	(Switzerland) Emil Frey Jaguar Racing			5			44	16			29	35	28					4	22
41	(United Kingdom) Alex Buncombe (United Kingdom) Matt Parry	(United Kingdom) GT SPORT MOTUL Team RJN			42			16	5			9	8	7					23	21
41	(Spain) Lucas Ordóñez	(United Kingdom) GT SPORT MOTUL Team RJN			42			16	5			9	8	7						42
42	(Portugal) Álvaro Parente	(United Kingdom) Strakka Racing			2				9											20
42	(Portugal) Álvaro Parente	(United Kingdom) Mercedes-AMG Team Strakka Racing										21	12	11					17	20
43	(United Kingdom) Andrew Watson	(France) 3Y Technology	17	17		DSQ	10			14	16				20	15				19.5
43	(United Kingdom) Andrew Watson	(United Kingdom) Garage 59			15			15	3			45	39	42					26	19.5
44	(United Kingdom) Ben Barnicoat (France) Côme Ledogar	(United Kingdom) Garage 59			15			15	3			45	39	42					26	19
45	(Puerto Rico) Félix Serrallés	(France) AKKA ASP Team	9	4		5	6													19
46	(Finland) Markus Palttala	(Switzerland) Emil Frey Lexus Racing			21			3	35			28	53	Ret	11	14	9	8	Ret	18
47	(Monaco) Vincent Abril (Spain) Andy Soucek (Belgium) Maxime Soulet	(United Kingdom) Bentley Team M-Sport			43			14	36			3	32	Ret					5	17
48	(Germany) Hubert Haupt	(Germany) Black Falcon			10			18	15			33	29	23	9	12	15	**2**	44	15
49	(Germany) Thomas Jäger	(United Kingdom) Strakka Racing						38												15
49	(Germany) Thomas Jäger	(France) Mercedes-AMG Team AKKA ASP							4											15
49	(Germany) Thomas Jäger	(Germany) SunEnergy1 Team HTP Motorsport										23	25	20						15
50	(Netherlands) Pieter Schothorst	(Germany) Attempto Racing	Ret	14	6	6	12	19	Ret	Ret	12	20	18	44	12	17	8	12	DNS	14.5
51	(Italy) David Fumanelli	(United Kingdom) Strakka Racing			8			8	8			8	16	17						14
52	(Finland) Jesse Krohn	(Germany) Rowe Racing			Ret			13	Ret			2	55	Ret					8	13
53	(Germany) Marvin Kirchhöfer (Belgium) Maxime Martin	(Switzerland) R-Motorsport			9			5	38			**17**	17	35					19	13
54	(France) Franck Perera	(Austria) GRT Grasser Racing Team	20	Ret	20	13	7	17	39	17	7	14	27	Ret	13	5			Ret	12
54	(Netherlands) Loris Hezemans	(Austria) GRT Grasser Racing Team	20	Ret		13	7			17	7				13	5				12
55	(United Kingdom) Alex Brundle	(Switzerland) R-Motorsport			9			5	38											12
56	(Germany) Nico Bastian (United Kingdom) Jack Manchester	(France) AKKA ASP Team	11	9	12	19	15	Ret	27	6	15	39	30	Ret	**7**	9	16	17	16	10.5
57	(Brazil) Felipe Fraga	(United Kingdom) Strakka Racing							8			57	58	Ret					7	10
58	(United Kingdom) Ricky Collard	(Germany) Rowe Racing			Ret			Ret	Ret			2	55	Ret						9
58	(Germany) Marco Wittmann	(Germany) Rowe Racing			Ret							2	55	Ret						9
59	(Switzerland) Nico Müller (Germany) René Rast	(Belgium) Audi Sport Team WRT										6	10	8						8
60	(Italy) Marco Mapelli	(Austria) GRT Grasser Racing Team			Ret				17			19	19	14					6	8
61	(France) Adrien Tambay	(United Kingdom) Strakka Racing			8			38	8											8
62	(Belgium) Gilles Magnus (Belgium) Alessio Picariello	(Belgium) Belgian Audi Club Team WRT	7	6																7.5
63	(Germany) Pierre Kaffer	(Germany) Attempto Racing	Ret	14	13	6	12	22	Ret	Ret	12	46	36	24	12	17	8	12		6.5
64	(Germany) Christian Vietoris	(United Kingdom) Strakka Racing										57	58	Ret					7	7
64	(United Kingdom) Oliver Rowland	(United Kingdom) Strakka Racing						38											7	6
64	(Russia) Vitaly Petrov	(Russia) SMP Racing by AKKA ASP			Ret			Ret	7			36	23	16						6
65	(Russia) Aleksey Korneev	(Russia) SMP Racing by AKKA ASP	16	8		18	Ret			12	17				8	18			14	4
65	(Russia) Vladimir Atoev	(Russia) SMP Racing by AKKA ASP	16	8		18	Ret			12	17				8	18				4
66	(Austria) Lucas Auer	(United Kingdom) Strakka Racing			8															4
67	(New Zealand) Earl Bamber (Germany) Timo Bernhard (Belgium) Laurens Vanthoor	(Germany) KÜS Team75 Bernhard										10	7	Ret						4
68	(United Kingdom) Chris Buncombe (United Kingdom) Nick Leventis (United Kingdom) Lewis Williamson	(United Kingdom) Strakka Racing			25			24	26			8	16	17					39	2
69	(France) Romain Dumas (France) Frédéric Makowiecki (Germany) Dirk Werner	(Germany) Manthey Racing			45			11	10			12	41	29					10	2
70	(France) Nyls Stievenart	(France) Saintéloc Racing	15	15	27	17	11	35	30	11	9	63	63	Ret	18	19	12	15	24	1
71	(Switzerland) Ricardo Feller (Belgium) Adrien De Leener	(Belgium) Belgian Audi Club Team WRT								10	13				14	10	13	Ret		1
72	(Saudi Arabia) Abdulaziz Al Faisal (Italy) Gabriele Piana	(Germany) Black Falcon			10			18	15			33	29	23					44	1
73	(Austria) Dominik Baumann	(Switzerland) R-Motorsport										**17**	17	35					19	1
74	(South Africa) David Perel	(Germany) Rinaldi Racing										18	21	15			Ret	10		0.5
74	(Russia) Rinat Salikhov	(Germany) Rinaldi Racing			18			41	Ret			18	21	15			Ret	10		0.5
74	(Brazil) Lukas Moraes	(France) 3Y Technology	17	17		DSQ	10			14	16				20	15	Ret	14		0.5
74	(Thailand) Piti Bhirombhakdi (Netherlands) Carlo van Dam	(Thailand) TP 12 - Kessel Racing	12	10		14	13			13	14				17	21	Ret	13		0.5
Pos.	Driver	Team	ZOL (Belgium)		MNZ (Italy)	BRH (United Kingdom)		SIL (United Kingdom)	LEC (France)	MIS (Italy)		6hrs	12hrs	24hrs	HUN (Hungary)		NÜR (Germany)		CAT (Spain)	Points
Pos.	Driver	Team	ZOL (Belgium)		MNZ (Italy)	BRH (United Kingdom)		SIL (United Kingdom)	LEC (France)	MIS (Italy)		SPA (Belgium)			HUN (Hungary)		NÜR (Germany)		CAT (Spain)	Points

Key
Colour	Result
Gold	Race winner
Silver	2nd place
Bronze	3rd place
Green	Points finish
Blue	Non-points finish
Blue	Non-classified finish (NC)
Purple	Did not finish (Ret)
Black	Disqualified (DSQ)
Black	Excluded (EX)
White	Did not start (DNS)
White	Race cancelled (C)
White	Withdrew (WD)
Blank	Did not participate

**Bold** – Pole
Italics – Fastest Lap

==== Silver Cup ====
Pos.	Driver	Team	ZOL (Belgium)		MNZ (Italy)	BRH (United Kingdom)		SIL (United Kingdom)	LEC (France)	MIS (Italy)		SPA (Belgium)			HUN (Hungary)		NÜR (Germany)		CAT (Spain)	Points
Pos.	Driver	Team	ZOL (Belgium)		MNZ (Italy)	BRH (United Kingdom)		SIL (United Kingdom)	LEC (France)	MIS (Italy)		6hrs	12hrs	24hrs	HUN (Hungary)		NÜR (Germany)		CAT (Spain)	Points
1	(Germany) Nico Bastian (United Kingdom) Jack Manchester	(France) AKKA ASP Team	11	9	12	**19**	**15**	Ret	27	6	15	39	30	Ret	**7**	9	**16**	17	16	157.5
2	(Germany) Hubert Haupt	(Germany) Black Falcon			10			18	15			33	29	23	9	**12**	15	**2**	44	140
3	(Switzerland) Alex Fontana (Canada) Mikaël Grenier	(Switzerland) Emil Frey Jaguar Racing			**5**			**44**	**16**	7	11	**29**	35	28					4	124.5
4	(Switzerland) Adrian Zaugg	(Switzerland) Emil Frey Jaguar Racing			**5**			**44**	**16**			**29**	35	28					4	103
5	(Saudi Arabia) Abdulaziz Al Faisal (Italy) Gabriele Piana	(Germany) Black Falcon			10			18	15			33	29	23					44	97
6	(Italy) Michele Beretta (Croatia) Martin Kodrić (United Kingdom) Sandy Mitchell	(United Kingdom) Barwell Motorsport			Ret			40	14			26	24	19					18	92
7	(Russia) Vladimir Atoev (Russia) Aleksey Korneev	(Russia) SMP Racing by AKKA ASP	16	8		18	Ret			12	17				8	18	14	11		80.5
8	(Italy) Alex Frassineti (France) Romain Monti (Italy) Andrea Rizzoli	(Italy) Ombra Racing			39			Ret	Ret			25	26	18					**12**	71
9	(Brazil) Lukas Moraes	(France) 3Y Technology	17	17		DSQ	10			14	16				20	15	Ret	14		59
10	(Russia) Denis Bulatov (France) Nico Jamin	(France) AKKA ASP Team								**Ret**	5				3	8				50.5
11	(United Kingdom) Andrew Watson	(France) 3Y Technology	17	17		DSQ	10			14	16				20	15				49.5
12	(Netherlands) Jules Szymkowiak	(France) AKKA ASP Team			12			Ret	27			39	30	Ret					16	49
13	(United Kingdom) Struan Moore (Mexico) Ricardo Sánchez	(United Kingdom) GT SPORT MOTUL Team RJN			Ret			29	23			44	38	37					42	48
14	(Switzerland) Ricardo Feller (Belgium) Adrien De Leener	(Belgium) Belgian Audi Club Team WRT								10	13				14	10	13	Ret		47
15	(Republic of Ireland) Charlie Eastwood (Oman) Ahmad Al Harthy (United Kingdom) Euan McKay	Oman Racing with TF Sport			19			39	19			61	61	Ret					22	47
16	(China) Kang Ling	(Italy) Ombra Racing										25	26	18						46
17	(United Kingdom) Jordan Witt	(United Kingdom) GT SPORT MOTUL Team RJN			Ret			29	23			44	38	37						44
18	(Germany) Luca Stolz	(Germany) Black Falcon													9	**12**	15	**2**		42
19	(Netherlands) Rik Breukers	(United Kingdom) Barwell Motorsport										26	24	19						39
20	(Germany) Lennart Marioneck (Switzerland) Patric Niederhauser (Norway) Mads Siljehaug	(Germany) Reiter Young Stars			16			23	Ret										36	36
21	(Belgium) Gilles Magnus (Belgium) Alessio Picariello	(Belgium) Belgian Audi Club Team WRT	**7**	**6**																35
22	(France) Arno Santamato	(Italy) Daiko Lazarus Racing			31			34	Ret			34	57	Ret					28	35
23	(United Kingdom) Josh Caygill (Republic of Ireland) Árón Taylor-Smith	(United Kingdom) Team Parker Racing	18	16		15	Ret			15	Ret									33
24	(Germany) Manuel Metzger	(Germany) Black Falcon										33	29	23						28
25	(Italy) Stefano Gattuso	(Italy) Daiko Lazarus Racing			31			34	Ret			34	57	Ret						27
26	(United Kingdom) Stuart Leonard (South Africa) Sheldon van der Linde	(Belgium) Belgian Audi Club Team WRT								8	**6**									22.5
27	(Italy) Federico Leo	(Italy) Daiko Lazarus Racing			31			34	Ret											20
28	(United Kingdom) Sean Walkinshaw	(United Kingdom) GT SPORT MOTUL Team RJN										44	38	37						17
29	(Germany) Fabian Schiller	(France) AKKA ASP Team										39	30	Ret						10
30	(Belgium) Denis Dupont	(France) 3Y Technology															Ret	14		9.5
31	(United Kingdom) Toby Sowery	(Italy) Daiko Lazarus Racing																	28	8
32	(Italy) Fabrizio Crestani (Germany) Nicolas Pohler	(Italy) Daiko Lazarus Racing										34	57	Ret						7
33	(Germany) Tobias Dauenhauer (Switzerland) Philipp Frommenwiler (Netherlands) Loris Hezemans (Switzerland) Nikolaj Rogivue	(Germany) Aust Motorsport										49	44	Ret						5
34	(United Kingdom) Colin Noble	(United Kingdom) GT SPORT MOTUL Team RJN																	42	4
35	(United Kingdom) Ross Gunn	Oman Racing with TF Sport										61	61	Ret						2
Pos.	Driver	Team	ZOL (Belgium)		MNZ (Italy)	BRH (United Kingdom)		SIL (United Kingdom)	LEC (France)	MIS (Italy)		6hrs	12hrs	24hrs	HUN (Hungary)		NÜR (Germany)		CAT (Spain)	Points
Pos.	Driver	Team	ZOL (Belgium)		MNZ (Italy)	BRH (United Kingdom)		SIL (United Kingdom)	LEC (France)	MIS (Italy)		SPA (Belgium)			HUN (Hungary)		NÜR (Germany)		CAT (Spain)	Points

==== Pro-Am Cup ====
Pos.	Driver	Team	ZOL (Belgium)		MNZ (Italy)	BRH (United Kingdom)		SIL (United Kingdom)	LEC (France)	MIS (Italy)		SPA (Belgium)			HUN (Hungary)		NÜR (Germany)		CAT (Spain)	Points
Pos.	Driver	Team	ZOL (Belgium)		MNZ (Italy)	BRH (United Kingdom)		SIL (United Kingdom)	LEC (France)	MIS (Italy)		6hrs	12hrs	24hrs	HUN (Hungary)		NÜR (Germany)		CAT (Spain)	Points
1	(France) Nyls Stievenart (Germany) Markus Winkelhock	(France) Saintéloc Racing	15	15	27	17	**11**	35		11	**9**				18	19	12	15	24	170.5
2	(Thailand) Piti Bhirombhakdi (Netherlands) Carlo van Dam	(Thailand) TP 12 - Kessel Racing	**12**	**10**		**14**	13			13	14				**17**	**21**	**Ret**	**13**		126
3	(Russia) Rinat Salikhov	(Germany) Rinaldi Racing			18			**41**	Ret			18	21	15			Ret	10	27	101.5
4	(United Kingdom) Chris Buncombe (United Kingdom) Nick Leventis (United Kingdom) Lewis Williamson	(United Kingdom) Strakka Racing			25			24	26			8	16	17					**39**	92
5	(United Kingdom) Duncan Cameron (Republic of Ireland) Matt Griffin	(Italy) AF Corse			30			26	20			35	33	21					25	89
6	(Germany) Alexander Mattschull	(Germany) Rinaldi Racing			18			**41**	Ret			18	21	15					27	85
7	(Germany) Daniel Keilwitz	(Germany) Rinaldi Racing						**41**				18	21	15					27	60
8	(South Africa) David Perel	(Germany) Rinaldi Racing										18	21	15			Ret	10		59.5
9	(Portugal) Rui Águas (Saudi Arabia) Saud Al Faisal (Greece) Kriton Lendoudis	(Germany) Black Falcon			29			28	25			48	45	31					35	51
10	(Italy) Giuseppe Cipriani (Italy) Fabrizio Crestani (Portugal) Miguel Ramos	(Italy) Daiko Lazarus Racing			40			27	32										20	49
11	(Italy) Lorenzo Bontempelli	(Switzerland) 961 Corse			28															45
11	(Italy) Lorenzo Bontempelli	(Italy) AF Corse										35	33	21					25	45
12	(Australia) Kenny Habul	(Germany) SunEnergy 1 Team HTP Motorsport										23	25	20						44.5
12	(Australia) Kenny Habul	(France) SunEnergy1 Racing													15	DNS				44.5
13	(United Kingdom) Seb Morris (United Kingdom) Derek Pierce (United Kingdom) Rob Smith	(United Kingdom) Team Parker Racing			22			Ret	21			59	54	Ret					43	43
14	(Italy) David Fumanelli	(United Kingdom) Strakka Racing										8	16	17						42
15	(United Kingdom) Darren Burke	(United Kingdom) Ram Racing						20	**37**			**54**	50	33						40
15	(United Kingdom) Euan Hankey (Turkey) Salih Yoluç	(United Kingdom) Ram Racing			DNS			20	**37**			**54**	50	33						40
16	(Slovakia) Christian Malchárek (Slovakia) Jirko Malchárek	Audi Sport Slovakia								**16**	19				19	20				39.5
17	(France) Marc Rostan	(France) Saintéloc Racing			27			35											24	36
18	(Italy) Gianluca de Lorenzi	(Italy) AF Corse							20											33
19	(Italy) Andrea Bertolini (Netherlands) Niek Hommerson (Belgium) Louis Machiels	(Italy) AF Corse			23			43	Ret			40	37	26					Ret	33
20	(Germany) Thomas Jäger (Austria) Martin Konrad (Germany) Bernd Schneider	(Germany) SunEnergy 1 Team HTP Motorsport										23	25	20						28
21	(Germany) Dominik Schwager	(Germany) Rinaldi Racing			18															25
22	(Poland) Michał Broniszewski	(Switzerland) Kessel Racing	13	18	**26**^{1}														Ret	22.5
23	(United Kingdom) Aaron Scott	(Italy) AF Corse										35	33	21						22
24	(Italy) Giacomo Piccini	(Switzerland) Kessel Racing	13	18																21.5
25	(France) Tristan Vautier	(France) SunEnergy 1 Racing													15	DNS				16.5
26	(Italy) Marco Cioci	(Italy) AF Corse										40	37	26						16
27	(Netherlands) Jeroen Bleekemolen (Germany) Marc Lieb (United States) Marc Miller (United States) Tim Pappas	(United States) Black Swan Racing										30	22	41						15
28	(Belgium) Bertrand Baguette (France) Loïc Depailler (Argentina) Esteban Guerrieri (Italy) Riccardo Patrese	(Italy) Castrol Honda Racing										37	31	32						14
29	(United Kingdom) Ian Loggie (United Kingdom) Callum MacLeod	(United Kingdom) Team Parker Racing				16	Ret													12
30	(United Kingdom) Tom Onslow-Cole	(Germany) Black Falcon										48	45	31						12
30	(United Kingdom) Tom Onslow-Cole	(United Kingdom) Ram Racing																	41	12
31	(Germany) Luca Ludwig	(Germany) Rinaldi Racing							Ret											10
31	(Germany) Luca Ludwig	(Austria) HB Racing																	30	10
31	(Germany) Jens Liebhauser (Germany) Florian Scholze	(Austria) HB Racing																	30	10
32	(Lebanon) Alex Demirdjian (Italy) Giancarlo Fisichella	(Switzerland) 961 Corse			28															8
32	(Spain) Toni Forné (Germany) Frank Stippler	(Germany) Car Collection Motorsport			37				Ret										31	8
32	(Germany) Dimitri Parhofer	(Germany) Car Collection Motorsport			37														31	8
33	(France) Jean-Luc Beaubelique (France) Nico Jamin (Italy) Mauro Ricci	(France) AKKA ASP Team			36			37	Ret										Ret	7
34	(Sweden) Felix Rosenqvist	(United Kingdom) Ram Racing										**54**	50	33						5
35	(Italy) Giacomo Altoè (Italy) Gianluca Giraudi (United States) Juan Perez (Italy) Loris Spinelli	(Italy) Antonelli Motorsport										43	42	46						4
36	(Netherlands) Remon Vos	(United Kingdom) Ram Racing																	41	2
36	(Slovakia) Miroslav Konôpka (Poland) Andrzej Lewandowski (China) Kang Ling	(Slovakia) ARC Bratislava			34															2
37	(Belgium) Sam Dejonghe (Belgium) Nicolas Vandierendonck (Belgium) Tim Verbergt (Belgium) Koen Wauters	(Belgium) Brussels Racing										50	48	45						1
38	(Italy) Alessandro Pier Guidi	(Switzerland) Kessel Racing			**26**^{1}														Ret	1
Pos.	Driver	Team	ZOL (Belgium)		MNZ (Italy)	BRH (United Kingdom)		SIL (United Kingdom)	LEC (France)	MIS (Italy)		6hrs	12hrs	24hrs	HUN (Hungary)		NÜR (Germany)		CAT (Spain)	Points
Pos.	Driver	Team	ZOL (Belgium)		MNZ (Italy)	BRH (United Kingdom)		SIL (United Kingdom)	LEC (France)	MIS (Italy)		SPA (Belgium)			HUN (Hungary)		NÜR (Germany)		CAT (Spain)	Points

Notes

- ^{1} – The No. 11 Kessel Racing Ferrari remained in race results at Monza, but was considered invisible and ineligible for points in the Drivers' and Teams' championships. Alessandro Pier Guidi was forced to exceed his maximum driver time, due to an injury suffered by his co-driver Michał Broniszewski in the paddock.

==== Am Cup ====
Pos.	Driver	Team	ZOL (Belgium)		MNZ (Italy)	BRH (United Kingdom)	SIL (United Kingdom)	LEC (France)	MIS (Italy)	SPA (Belgium)			HUN (Hungary)	NÜR (Germany)	CAT (Spain)	Points
Pos.	Driver	Team	ZOL (Belgium)		MNZ (Italy)	BRH (United Kingdom)	SIL (United Kingdom)	LEC (France)	MIS (Italy)	6hrs	12hrs	24hrs	HUN (Hungary)	NÜR (Germany)	CAT (Spain)	Points
1	(Switzerland) Adrian Amstutz (Russia) Leo Machitski	(United Kingdom) Barwell Motorsport			33		42	22		32	34	27			29	124
2	(United Kingdom) Chris Goodwin (United Kingdom) Chris Harris (Sweden) Alexander West	(United Kingdom) Garage 59			Ret		**25**	**18**		**45**	39	42			37	92
4	(France) Fabien Barthez (France) Eric Debard (Switzerland) Philippe Giauque	(France) AKKA ASP Team			**32**		31	24		62	62	Ret			**33**	81
4	(Germany) Pierre Ehret (South Korea) Rick Yoon	(Germany) Rinaldi Racing			35		33	29		42	43	34			38	75
5	(United Kingdom) Richard Abra	(United Kingdom) Barwell Motorsport								32	34	27			29	74
6	(Germany) Immanuel Vinke	(Germany) Walkenhorst Motorsport			41		36	28		51	46	38			34	66
7	(Switzerland) Philippe Giauque	(France) AKKA ASP Team			**32**		31	24		62	62	Ret				65
8	(Germany) Edward Lewis Brauner (Germany) Jürgen Häring (Germany) Wolfgang Triller	(Germany) Herberth Motorsport			38		32	34		56	51	39			32	63
9	(Finland) Rory Penttinen	(Germany) Rinaldi Racing			35		33	29							38	56
9	(Finland) Rory Penttinen	(Germany) Attempto Racing								47	49	Ret				56
10	(Germany) Henry Walkenhorst	(Germany) Walkenhorst Motorsport			41		36			51	46	38			34	51
11	(Finland) Patrick Kujala	(United Kingdom) Barwell Motorsport								32	34	27				49
12	(Germany) Ralf Oeverhaus	(Germany) Walkenhorst Motorsport						28		51	46	38			34	46
13	(Norway) Anders Buchardt	(Germany) Walkenhorst Motorsport			41			28		51	46	38				44
14	(Portugal) Francisco Guedes	(United Kingdom) Barwell Motorsport			33			22								42
15	(France) Pierre Feligioni (France) Claude-Yves Gosselin	(Belgium) Boutsen Ginion Racing	**19**	**19**												35
16	(Italy) Stefano Costantini (France) Sylvain Debs (Belgium) Bernard Delhez (Italy) Alberto Di Folco	(Italy) Target Racing								38	40	30				34
17	(United States) Nicholas Boulle (Germany) Murad Sultanov	(Germany) Rinaldi Racing								42	43	34				28
18	(United Kingdom) Andrew Watson	(United Kingdom) Garage 59								**45**	39	42				22
19	(Italy) Christian Colombo (Italy) Matteo Cressoni (Singapore) Gregory Teo (Indonesia) David Tjiptobiantoro	(Singapore) T2 Motorsports								53	47	36				18
20	(Germany) Alfred Renauer	(Germany) Herberth Motorsport								56	51	39				12
21	(Germany) Andreas Ziegler	(Germany) Walkenhorst Motorsport					36									10
22	(Belgium) Christian Kelders (France) Marc Rostan (France) Nyls Stievenart	(France) Saintéloc Racing						30		63	63	Ret				9
23	(Germany) John-Louis Jasper (Switzerland) Jürgen Krebs (Switzerland) Tim Müller	(Germany) Attempto Racing								47	49	Ret				9
24	(United Kingdom) Jon Minshaw	(United Kingdom) Barwell Motorsport					42									8
25	(France) Nico Jamin	(France) AKKA ASP Team								62	62	Ret				2
Pos.	Driver	Team	ZOL (Belgium)		MNZ (Italy)	BRH (United Kingdom)	SIL (United Kingdom)	LEC (France)	MIS (Italy)	6hrs	12hrs	24hrs	HUN (Hungary)	NÜR (Germany)	CAT (Spain)	Points
Pos.	Driver	Team	ZOL (Belgium)		MNZ (Italy)	BRH (United Kingdom)	SIL (United Kingdom)	LEC (France)	MIS (Italy)	SPA (Belgium)			HUN (Hungary)	NÜR (Germany)	CAT (Spain)	Points

=== Teams' championships ===
==== Overall ====
Pos.	Team	Manufacturer	ZOL (Belgium)		MNZ (Italy)	BRH (United Kingdom)		SIL (United Kingdom)	LEC (France)	MIS (Italy)		SPA (Belgium)			HUN (Hungary)		NÜR (Germany)		CAT (Spain)	Points
Pos.	Team	Manufacturer	ZOL (Belgium)		MNZ (Italy)	BRH (United Kingdom)		SIL (United Kingdom)	LEC (France)	MIS (Italy)		6hrs	12hrs	24hrs	HUN (Hungary)		NÜR (Germany)		CAT (Spain)	Points
1	(France) (Mercedes-AMG Team) AKKA ASP (Russia) SMP Racing by AKKA ASP (France) SunEnergy 1 Racing	Mercedes-AMG	8	2	11	3	4	2	4	**2**	**5**	15	3	6	**2**	**1**	4	1	2	191
2	(Belgium) Audi Sport/Belgian Audi Club Team WRT	Audi	**2**	5	1	**1**	**1**	4	12	1	1	6	10	8	5	4	1	9	15	174
3	(Switzerland) Emil Frey Jaguar/Lexus Racing	Jaguar; Lexus	14	13	5	9	9	3	1	5	8	28	20	13	6	13	5	7	4	120.5
4	(Austria) GRT Grasser Racing Team	Lamborghini	1	**3**	4	10	5	10	13	3	7	14	19	14	1	5	**3**	5	6	119
5	(France) (Audi Sport Team) Saintéloc Racing	Audi	10	12	14	7	8	35	6	11	3	16	4	4	4	2	10	3	24	109.5
6	(Germany) (Mercedes-AMG Team) Black Falcon	Mercedes-AMG			3			6	15			5	2	5	9	12	15	**2**	**1**	103
7	(Germany) Attempto Racing	Audi	4	1	6	6	3	19	Ret	Ret	4	20	18	24	10	3	6	4	11	92
8	(United Kingdom) Bentley Team M-Sport	Bentley			24			14	2			3	5	25					5	48
9	(Germany) Walkenhorst Motorsport	BMW			41			36	28			4	1	1					34	44
10	(United Kingdom) (Mercedes-AMG Team) Strakka Racing	Mercedes-AMG			2			8	8			8	12	11					7	42
11	(Germany) Rowe Racing	BMW			Ret			13	11			2	6	2					8	41
12	(Switzerland) R-Motorsport	Aston Martin			9			**1**	**31**			**13**	11	9					19	39
13	(Switzerland) (Thailand) (TP 12 -) Kessel Racing	Ferrari	12	10	26^{1}	14	13			13	14				17	21	Ret	13	Ret	26.5
14	(Russia) SMP Racing	Ferrari			**44**			7	33			22	14	10					3	26
15	(United Kingdom) GT SPORT MOTUL Team RJN	Nissan			42			16	5			9	8	7					23	26
16	(United Kingdom) Garage 59	McLaren			15			15	3			41	28	22					26	20
17	(France) 3Y Technology	BMW	17	17		DSQ	10			14	16				20	15	Ret	14		11
18	(Germany) Manthey Racing	Porsche			45			11	10			12	41	29					10	10
19	(United Kingdom) Team Parker Racing	Bentley	18	16	22	15	Ret	Ret	21	16	Ret	59	54	Ret					43	7
20	Audi Sport Slovakia	Audi								16	19				19	19				4
21	(Germany) Rinaldi Racing	Ferrari			18			33	29			18	21	15			Ret	10		2
22	(Belgium) Boutsen Ginion Racing	Lamborghini	19	19																1
Pos.	Team	Manufacturer	ZOL (Belgium)		MNZ (Italy)	BRH (United Kingdom)		SIL (United Kingdom)	LEC (France)	MIS (Italy)		6hrs	12hrs	24hrs	HUN (Hungary)		NÜR (Germany)		CAT (Spain)	Points
Pos.	Team	Manufacturer	ZOL (Belgium)		MNZ (Italy)	BRH (United Kingdom)		SIL (United Kingdom)	LEC (France)	MIS (Italy)		SPA (Belgium)			HUN (Hungary)		NÜR (Germany)		CAT (Spain)	Points

Notes

- ^{1} – The No. 11 Kessel Racing Ferrari remained in race results at Monza, but was considered invisible and ineligible for points in the Drivers' and Teams' championships. Alessandro Pier Guidi was forced to exceed his maximum driver time, due to an injury suffered by his co-driver Michał Broniszewski in the paddock.

==== Pro-Am Cup ====
Pos.	Team	Manufacturer	ZOL (Belgium)		MNZ (Italy)	BRH (United Kingdom)		SIL (United Kingdom)	LEC (France)	MIS (Italy)		SPA (Belgium)			HUN (Hungary)		NÜR (Germany)		CAT (Spain)	Points
Pos.	Team	Manufacturer	ZOL (Belgium)		MNZ (Italy)	BRH (United Kingdom)		SIL (United Kingdom)	LEC (France)	MIS (Italy)		6hrs	12hrs	24hrs	HUN (Hungary)		NÜR (Germany)		CAT (Spain)	Points
1	(France) Saintéloc Racing	Audi	15	15	27	17	**11**	35		11	**9**				18	19	12	15	24	173
2	(Switzerland) (Thailand) (TP 12 -) Kessel Racing	Ferrari	**12**	**10**	**26**^{1}	**14**	13			13	14				**17**	**21**	**Ret**	**13**	Ret	127
3	(Switzerland) 961 Corse (Italy) AF Corse	Ferrari			23			26	20			35	33	21					25	107
4	(Germany) Rinaldi Racing	Ferrari			18			**41**	Ret			18	21	15			Ret	10	27	101.5
5	(United Kingdom) Strakka Racing	Mercedes-AMG			25			24	26			8	16	17					**39**	92
6	(Germany) Black Falcon	Mercedes-AMG			29			28	25			48	45	31					35	67
6	(United Kingdom) Team Parker Racing	Bentley			22	16	Ret	Ret	21			59	54	Ret					43	63
8	(United Kingdom) Ram Racing	Mercedes-AMG			DNS			20	**37**			**54**	50	Ret					41	58
9	(Italy) Daiko Lazarus Racing	Lamborghini			40			27	32										20	50
10	Audi Sport Slovakia	Audi								**16**	19				19	20				39.5
11	(France) AKKA ASP Team (France) Sun Energy1 Racing	Mercedes-AMG			36			37	Ret						15	DNS			Ret	26.5
12	(Germany) Car Collection Motorsport	Audi			37				Ret										31	10
13	(Slovakia) ARC Bratislava	Mercedes-AMG			34															6
Pos.	Team	Manufacturer	ZOL (Belgium)		MNZ (Italy)	BRH (United Kingdom)		SIL (United Kingdom)	LEC (France)	MIS (Italy)		6hrs	12hrs	24hrs	HUN (Hungary)		NÜR (Germany)		CAT (Spain)	Points
Pos.	Team	Manufacturer	ZOL (Belgium)		MNZ (Italy)	BRH (United Kingdom)		SIL (United Kingdom)	LEC (France)	MIS (Italy)		SPA (Belgium)			HUN (Hungary)		NÜR (Germany)		CAT (Spain)	Points

Notes

- ^{1} – The No. 11 Kessel Racing Ferrari remained in race results at Monza, but was considered invisible and ineligible for points in the Drivers' and Teams' championships. Alessandro Pier Guidi was forced to exceed his maximum driver time, due to an injury suffered by his co-driver Michał Broniszewski in the paddock.

==== Am Cup ====
Pos.	Team	Manufacturer	ZOL (Belgium)		MNZ (Italy)	BRH (United Kingdom)	SIL (United Kingdom)	LEC (France)	MIS (Italy)	SPA (Belgium)			HUN (Hungary)	NÜR (Germany)	CAT (Spain)	Points
Pos.	Team	Manufacturer	ZOL (Belgium)		MNZ (Italy)	BRH (United Kingdom)	SIL (United Kingdom)	LEC (France)	MIS (Italy)	6hrs	12hrs	24hrs	HUN (Hungary)	NÜR (Germany)	CAT (Spain)	Points
1	(United Kingdom) Barwell Motorsport	Lamborghini			33		42	22		32	34	27			29	124
2	(United Kingdom) Garage 59	McLaren			Ret		**25**	**18**		**45**	39	42			37	95
3	(France) AKKA ASP Team	Mercedes-AMG			**32**		31	24		62	62	Ret			**33**	83
4	(Germany) Rinaldi Racing	Ferrari			35		33	29		42	43	34			38	81
5	(Germany) Walkenhorst Motorsport	BMW			41		36	34		51	46	38			34	70
6	(Germany) Herberth Motorsport	Porsche			38		32	28		56	51	39			32	67
7	(Belgium) Boutsen Ginion Racing	Lamborghini	**19**	**19**												35
8	(Singapore) T2 Motorsports	Ferrari								53	47	36				24
9	(Germany) Attempto Racing	Lamborghini								47	49	Ret				11
10	(France) Saintéloc Racing	Audi						30		63	63	Ret				11
Pos.	Team	Manufacturer	ZOL (Belgium)		MNZ (Italy)	BRH (United Kingdom)	SIL (United Kingdom)	LEC (France)	MIS (Italy)	6hrs	12hrs	24hrs	HUN (Hungary)	NÜR (Germany)	CAT (Spain)	Points
Pos.	Team	Manufacturer	ZOL (Belgium)		MNZ (Italy)	BRH (United Kingdom)	SIL (United Kingdom)	LEC (France)	MIS (Italy)	SPA (Belgium)			HUN (Hungary)	NÜR (Germany)	CAT (Spain)	Points

== See also ==
- 2018 Blancpain GT Series Endurance Cup
- 2018 Blancpain GT Series Sprint Cup
- 2018 Blancpain GT Series Asia
