= Auto Sport Promotion =

French sports car racing team

(France) Auto Sport Promotion
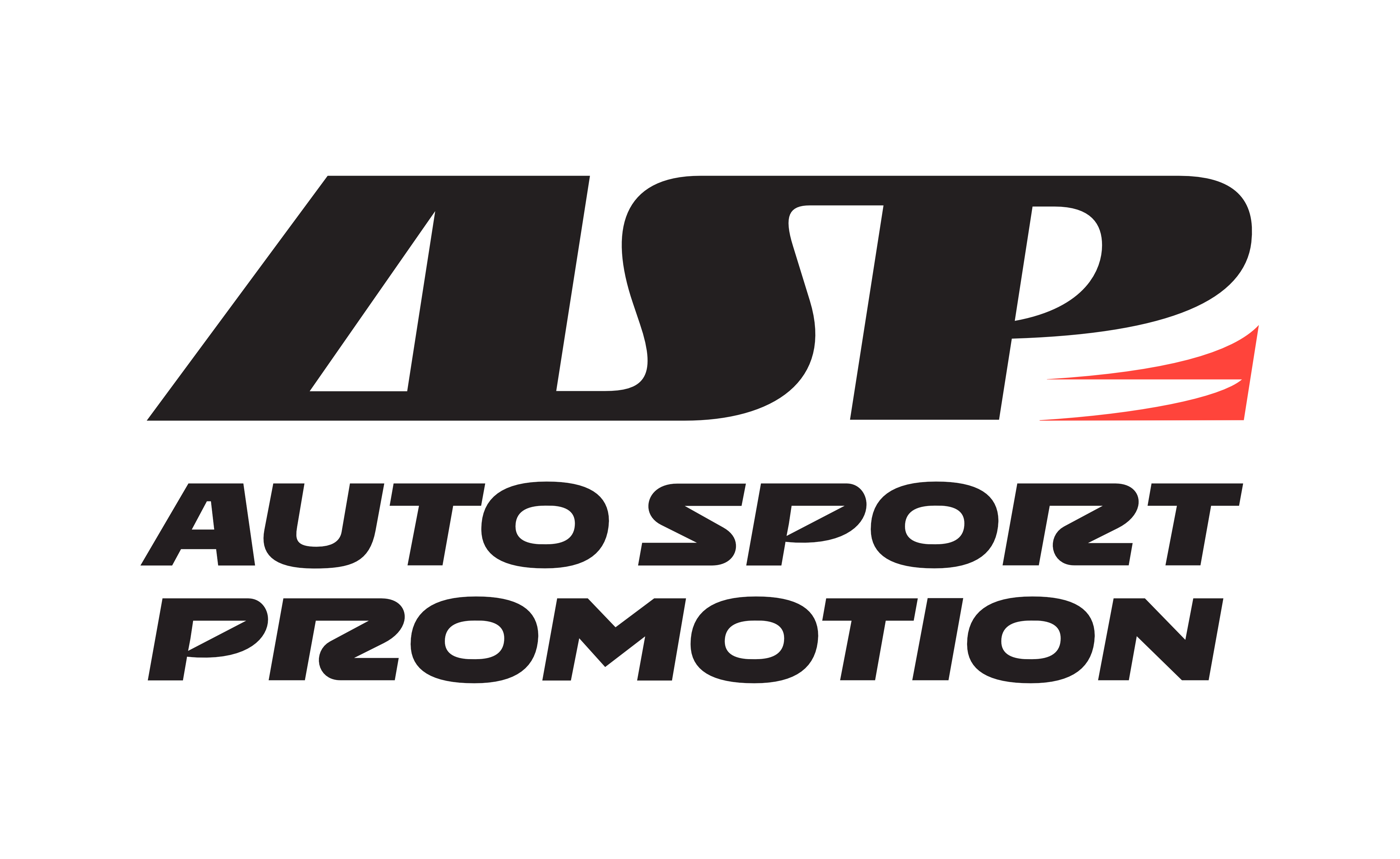
- Founded: 1999
- Base: Rabastens, France
- Founder(s): Jérôme Policand
- Current series: FIA World Endurance Championship; GT2 European Series; GT4 European Series
- Former series: Eurocup Mégane Trophy; FFSA GT Championship; GT World Challenge Europe; Porsche Carrera Cup France
- Current drivers: (United Kingdom) Ben Barnicoat (France) Christophe Bourret (France) Hadrien David (Spain) Jan Duran (Germany) Finn Gehrsitz (France) Pascal Gibon (France) Cindy Gudet (Czech Republic) Gabriela Jílková (Argentina) José María López (France) Esteban Masson (France) Arnold Robin (Austria) Clemens Schmid (Romania) Petru Umbrărescu (Belgium) Tom Van Rompuy
- Teams' Championships: 2005, 2006, 2008, 2009, 2010 Porsche Carrera Cup France, 2013, 2014, 2015, 2021 FFSA GT, 2018, 2019 Blancpain GT, 2022, 2023 GTWC Europe
- Drivers' Championships: 1999 Eurocup Mégane Trophy, 2005, 2006, 2008, 2010 Porsche Carrera Cup France, 2013, 2021 FFSA GT, 2018, 2019 Blancpain GT, 2020, 2022, 2023 GTWC Europe
- Website: https://www.akkodis-asp-team.com/

Auto Sport Promotion, also known simply as ASP, is a French sports car racing team founded by racing driver Jérôme Policand in 1999. The team is based in Rabastens, France. It currently races as Akkodis ASP Team as part of a title sponsorship agreement with digital engineering company Akkodis, first reached in 2015 under Akka Technologies.

Between 2016 and 2023, ASP raced in Mercedes-AMG machinery in the GT World Challenge Europe series, becoming a factory partner in 2018. ASP currently works with Lexus, assisting their LMGT3 factory programme in the FIA World Endurance Championship. The team continues to use Mercedes sports cars in the GT2 European Series as customers, and also currently race Toyotas in the GT4 European Series as Matmut Évolution.

== Racing history ==
ASP first competed in motor racing through the Eurocup Mégane Trophy, where founder Jérôme Policand won the title in 1999. ASP also raced in the Porsche Carrera Cup France series in the 2000s, winning the Drivers' championships in 2005, 2006, and 2008 with Anthony Beltoise, and in 2010 with Frédéric Makowiecki.

In 2011, ASP officially debuted in the Blancpain Endurance Series, competing with a two-car entry driving the Ferrari 458 Italia GT3. The team's Pro-Am entry, driven by Ludovic Badey, Jean-Luc Beaubélique, and Franck Morel finished 2nd in the Pro-Am class. That year, they also won the 2011 24 Hours of Spa in the Pro-Am class. ASP finished 2nd in the Pro-Am again in the 2012 Blancpain Endurance Series, and proceeded to take another Spa 24 Hours victory a year later in the 2013 24 Hours of Spa through the Gentleman Trophy class. ASP team made their first appearance at the 24 Hours of Le Mans in 2014, entering a Ferrari 458 Italia GT2 with drivers Soheil Ayari, Anthony Pons, and professional footballer Fabien Barthez. The team made it to the finish, finishing 29th overall and 9th in class.

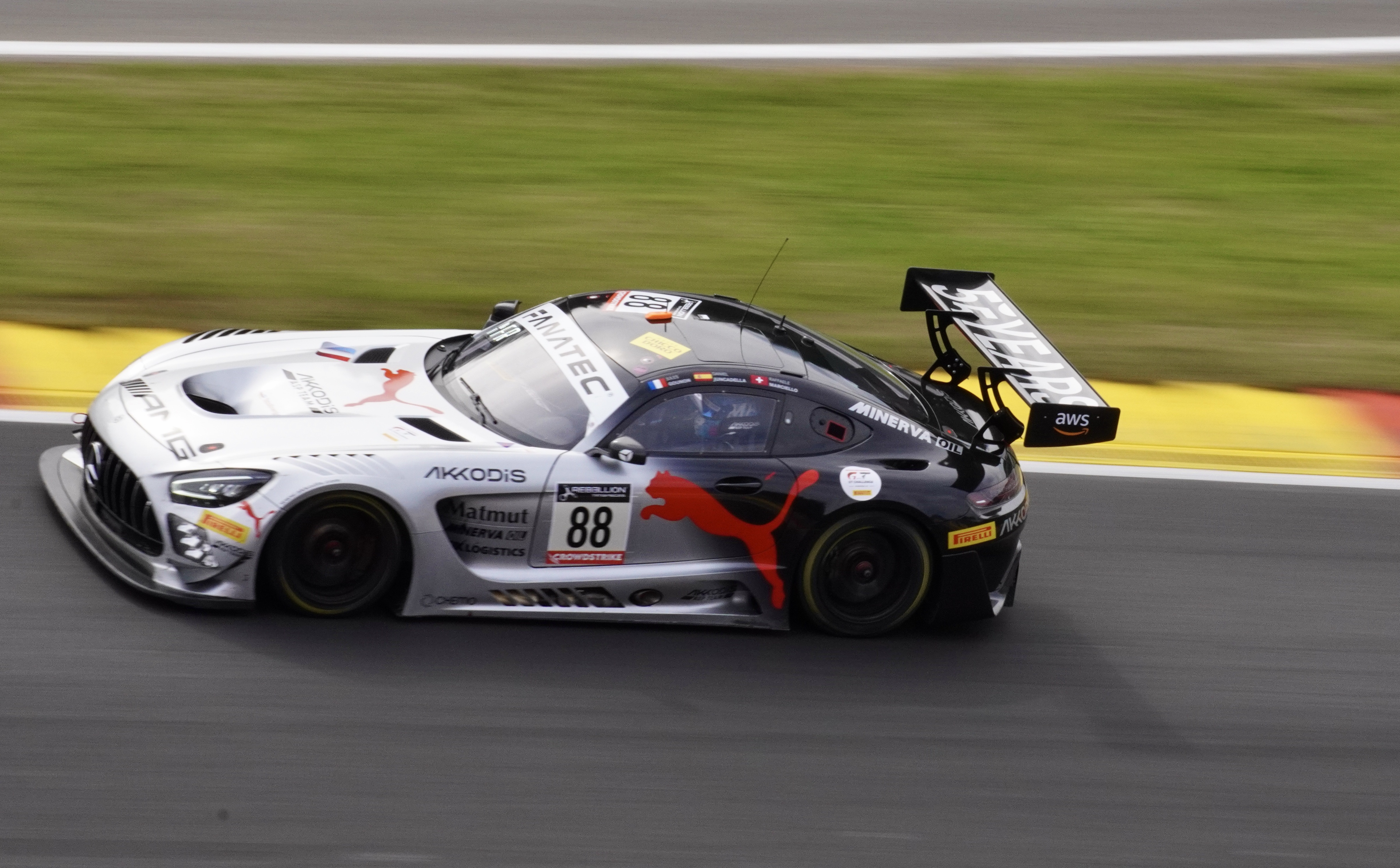
Akkodis ASP's #88 Mercedes-AMG GT3 Evo at the 2023 24 Hours of Spa.

ASP officially made the switch to Mercedes-AMG machinery ahead of the 2016 Blancpain GT Series after five seasons of competition with the Ferrari 458 platform. In the team's first full season with the Mercedes-AMG GT3, they achieved 8th in the Pro class, 2nd in Pro-Am, and 4th in Am. ASP won their maiden race in the series that year, doing so in the season finale at Circuit de Barcelona-Catalunya with Tristan Vautier and Felix Rosenqvist. They would win in Barcelona again in 2017 with Vautier and Daniel Juncadella to earn their second victory in the series.

The 2018 Blancpain GT Series was a breakthrough season for ASP, as they won the overall Drivers' championship with Raffaele Marciello, including the Sprint Cup drivers' championship with Marciello and Michael Meadows, and the Silver Cup drivers' championship with Nico Bastian and Jack Manchester. ASP took the Silver Cup drivers' title again in the 2019 Blancpain GT Series with Bastian. In 2020, Timur Boguslavskiy won the GT World Challenge Europe overall championship with ASP. The team would take back-to-back overall championships in 2022 and 2023, winning the 2022 GT World Challenge Europe and 2023 GT World Challenge Europe titles each with Marciello, the latter winning along with Boguslavskiy.

ASP ventured into GT4 racing in 2020, entering a Mercedes-AMG GT4 in the 2020 GT4 European Series season finale at Circuit Paul Ricard. The team committed to a full-season pursuit the following year and eventually won the Pro-Am class title in the 2022 GT4 European Series. The team moved to the French GT4 Cup in 2023, entering a pair of Toyota GR Supra GT4 sports cars in with backing from French insurance company Matmut, racing as Matmut Évolution. Matmut, with ASP's help, launched the 'Volant Matmut 100% Féminin' programme, allowing female racing drivers the opportunity to compete in motor racing. One of the ASP entries would be designated for the selected female drivers. Gabriela Jílková and Lucile Cypriano joined Enzo Joulié and Étienne Cheli for the full 2023 season. The team returned to the GT4 European Series in 2024, retaining Joulié and Cheli, and recruiting Cindy Gudet to race with Jílková, who also returned to the team.

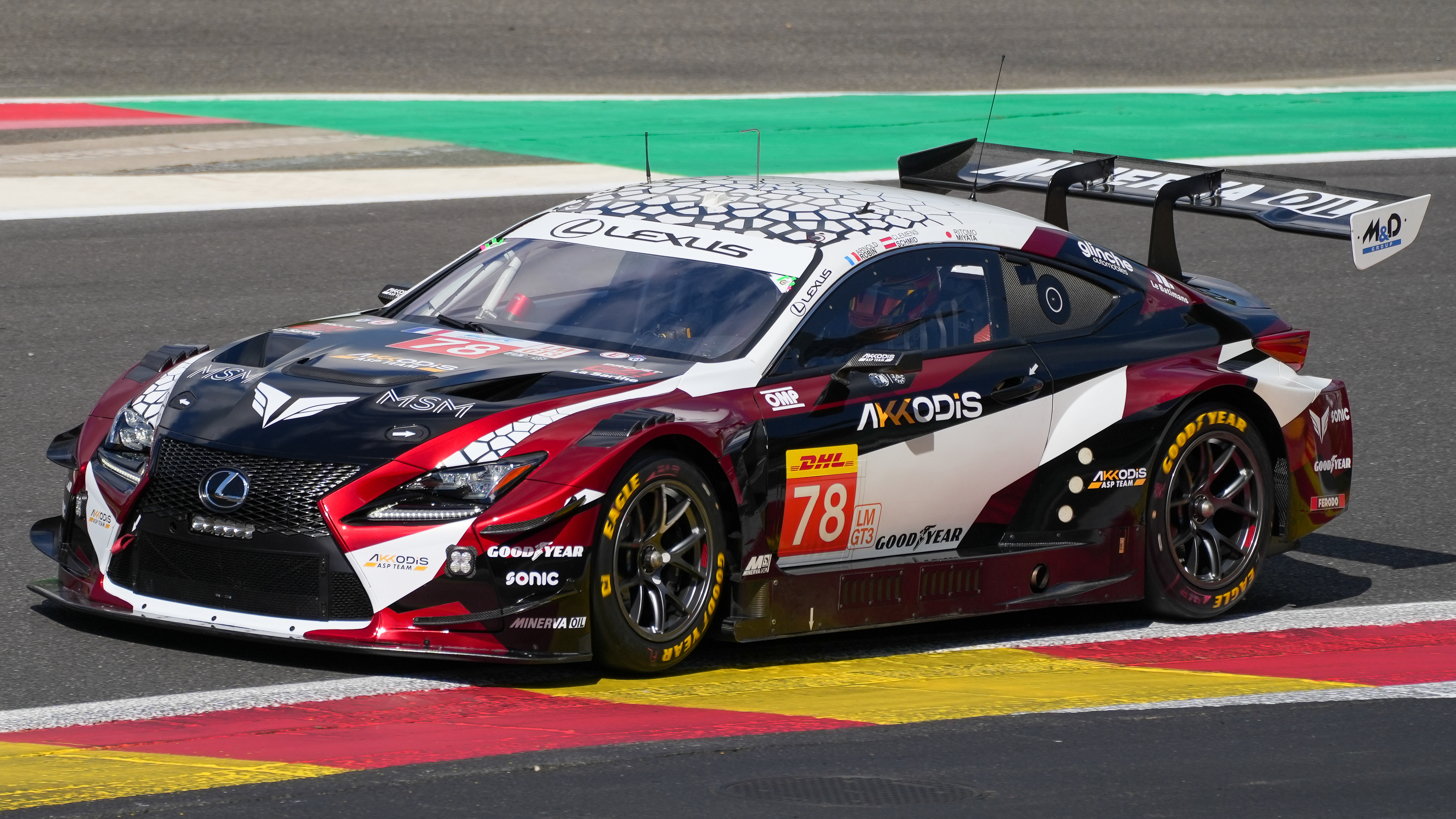
Akkodis ASP's #78 Lexus RC F GT3 at the 2024 6 Hours of Spa-Francorchamps.

Ahead of the 2024 FIA World Endurance Championship, ASP confirmed that they would be selected by Lexus to help operate their LMGT3 team. Following the announcement, ASP officially paused their GT World Challenge programme, leaving the series after thirteen seasons. Boguslavskiy returned with ASP to race the #78 car alongside Kelvin van der Linde and Arnold Robin, and the sister #87 car would be driven by Esteban Masson, Takeshi Kimura, and José María López, who helped test the RC F with ASP at Algarve International Circuit. ASP and Lexus achieved their first WEC LMGT3 class victory in 2025 at the 2025 6 Hours of São Paulo with Lopez, Clemens Schmid, and Petru Umbrărescu.

== Race results ==
=== 24 Hours of Le Mans ===
Year	Entrant	No.	Car	Drivers	Class	Laps	Pos.	Class Pos.
2014	(France) Team Sofrev ASP	58	Ferrari 458 Italia GT2	(France) Soheil Ayari (France) Fabien Barthez (France) Anthony Pons	LMGTE Am	325	29th	9th
2024	(France) Akkodis ASP Team	78	Lexus RC F GT3	Timur Boguslavskiy (France) Arnold Robin (South Africa) Kelvin van der Linde	LMGT3	279	34th	7th
2024	(France) Akkodis ASP Team	87	Lexus RC F GT3	(United Kingdom) Jack Hawksworth (Japan) Takeshi Kimura (France) Esteban Masson	LMGT3	279	37th	10th
2025	(France) Akkodis ASP Team	78	Lexus RC F GT3	(Germany) Finn Gehrsitz (United Kingdom) Jack Hawksworth (France) Arnold Robin	LMGT3	268	DNF	DNF
2025	(France) Akkodis ASP Team	87	Lexus RC F GT3	(Argentina) José María López (Austria) Clemens Schmid (Romania) Petru Umbrărescu	LMGT3	340	37th	5th
2026	(France) Akkodis ASP Team	78	Lexus RC F GT3	(France) Hadrien David (United Kingdom) Jack Hawksworth (Belgium) Tom Van Rompuy	LMGT3	335	34th	2nd
2026	(France) Akkodis ASP Team	87	Lexus RC F GT3	(Argentina) José María López (Austria) Clemens Schmid (Romania) Petru Umbrărescu	LMGT3	335	36th	4th

=== 24 Hours of Spa ===
Year	Entrant	No.	Car	Drivers	Class	Laps	Pos.	Class Pos.
2011	(France) SOFREV Auto Sport Promotion	10	Ferrari 458 Italia GT3	(France) Patrice Goueslard (France) Julien Jousse (France) Olivier Pla	GT3 Pro	374	Ret	Ret
2011	(France) SOFREV Auto Sport Promotion	20	Ferrari 458 Italia GT3	(France) Ludovic Badey (France) Jean-Luc Beaubélique (France) Guillaume Moreau (France) Franck Morel	GT3 Pro-Am	530	6th	1st
2012	(France) SOFREV Auto Sport Promotion	10	Ferrari 458 Italia GT3	(France) Fabien Barthez (France) Eric Debard (France) Morgan Moulin-Traffort (France) Olivier Panis	GT3 Pro-Am	497	9th	3rd
2012	(France) SOFREV Auto Sport Promotion	20	Ferrari 458 Italia GT3	(France) Ludovic Badey (France) Jean-Luc Beaubélique (France) Patrice Goueslard (France) Tristan Vautier	GT3 Pro-Am	495	10th	5th
2013	(France) SOFREV Auto Sport Promotion	20	Ferrari 458 Italia GT3	(France) Jean-Luc Beaubélique (France) Jean-Luc Blanchemain (France) Patrice Goueslard (France) Frédéric Bouvy	Gentleman Trophy	539	16th	1st
2014	(France) SOFREV Auto Sport Promotion	116	Ferrari 458 Italia GT3	(France) Ludovic Badey (France) Fabien Barthez (France) Eric Debard (France) Tristan Vautier	Pro-Am	503	22nd	11th
2014	(France) SOFREV Auto Sport Promotion	120	Ferrari 458 Italia GT3	(France) Jean-Philippe Belloc (France) Christophe Bourret (France) Julien Canal (France) Pascal Gibon	Pro-Am	509	19th	8th
2015	(France) AKKA ASP	10	Ferrari 458 Italia GT3	(France) Jean-Philippe Belloc (France) Christophe Bourret (France) Pascal Gibon (France) Philippe Polette	Am	510	20th	4th
2016	(France) AKKA ASP	88	Mercedes-AMG GT3	(Sweden) Felix Rosenqvist (Netherlands) Renger van der Zande (France) Tristan Vautier	Pro	531	2nd	2nd
2016	(France) AKKA ASP	89	Mercedes-AMG GT3	(France) Laurent Cazenave (United Kingdom) Michael Lyons (France) Morgan Moullin-Traffort (Switzerland) Daniele Perfetti	Pro-Am	523	19th	4th
2017	(France) AKKA ASP Team	88	Mercedes-AMG GT3	(Spain) Daniel Juncadella (Puerto Rico) Félix Serrallés (France) Tristan Vautier	Pro	209	Ret	Ret
2017	(France) AKKA ASP Team	89	Mercedes-AMG GT3	(France) Ludovic Badey (Germany) Nico Bastian (Switzerland) Alex Fontana (Switzerland) Daniele Perfetti	Pro-Am	176	Ret	Ret
2017	(France) AKKA ASP Team	90	Mercedes-AMG GT3	(Italy) Raffaele Marciello (United Kingdom) Michael Meadows (Italy) Edoardo Mortara	Pro	546	3rd	3rd
2018	(Russia) SMP Racing by AKKA ASP	35	Mercedes-AMG GT3	(Russia) Denis Bulatov (United Kingdom) Michael Meadows (Russia) Vitaly Petrov	Pro	505	16th	15th
2018	(France) Mercedes-AMG Team AKKA ASP	88	Mercedes-AMG GT3	(Spain) Daniel Juncadella (Italy) Raffaele Marciello (France) Tristan Vautier	Pro	510	6th	6th
2018	(France) AKKA ASP Team	89	Mercedes-AMG GT3	(France) Fabien Barthez (France) Eric Debard (Switzerland) Philippe Giauque (France) Nico Jamin	Am	43	Ret	Ret
2018	(France) AKKA ASP Team	90	Mercedes-AMG GT3	(Germany) Nico Bastian (United Kingdom) Jack Manchester (Germany) Fabian Schiller (Netherlands) Jules Szymkowiak	Silver	261	Ret	Ret
2019	(France) Mercedes-AMG Team AKKA ASP	88	Mercedes-AMG GT3	(Monaco) Vincent Abril (Italy) Raffaele Marciello (Germany) Fabian Schiller	Pro	361	13th	13th
2019	(France) AKKA ASP Team	90	Mercedes-AMG GT3	(Germany) Nico Bastian (Russia) Timur Boguslavskiy (Brazil) Felipe Fraga	Silver	361	17th	2nd
2020	(France) AKKA ASP Team	87	Mercedes-AMG GT3 Evo	(France) Fabien Barthez (France) Jean-Luc Beaubélique (France) Thomas Drouet (France) Jim Pla	Pro-Am	275	Ret	Ret
2020	(France) Mercedes-AMG Team AKKA ASP	88	Mercedes-AMG GT3 Evo	(Russia) Timur Boguslavskiy (Brazil) Felipe Fraga (Italy) Raffaele Marciello	Pro	263	Ret	Ret
2020	(France) AKKA ASP Team	89	Mercedes-AMG GT3 Evo	(Switzerland) Alex Fontana (Chile) Benjamín Hites (Switzerland) Lucas Légeret	Silver	497	29th	6th
2021	(France) AKKA ASP Team	87	Mercedes-AMG GT3 Evo	(France) Thomas Drouet (France) Simon Gachet (Russia) Konstantin Tereshchenko (Romania) Petru Umbrărescu	Silver	545	23th	7th
2021	(France) Mercedes-AMG Team AKKA ASP	88	Mercedes-AMG GT3 Evo	(France) Jules Gounon (Spain) Daniel Juncadella (Italy) Raffaele Marciello	Pro	344	Ret	Ret
2021	(France) AKKA ASP Team	89	Mercedes-AMG GT3 Evo	(Austria) Lucas Auer (Russia) Timur Boguslavskiy (Brazil) Felipe Fraga	Pro	552	10th	10th
2022	(France) AKKodis ASP Team	87	Mercedes-AMG GT3 Evo	(France) Thomas Drouet (Italy) Tommaso Mosca (United Kingdom) Casper Stevenson	Silver	367	Ret	Ret
2022	(France) AMG Team AKKodis ASP	88	Mercedes-AMG GT3 Evo	(France) Jules Gounon (Spain) Daniel Juncadella (Switzerland) Raffaele Marciello	Pro	536	1st	1st
2023	(France) Mercedes-AMG Team AKKodis ASP	87	Mercedes-AMG GT3 Evo	(France) Thomas Drouet (Italy) Lorenzo Ferrari (Germany) Maximilian Götz	Pro	304	Ret	Ret
2023	(France) AKKodis ASP Team	88	Mercedes-AMG GT3 Evo	Timur Boguslavskiy (Andorra) Jules Gounon (Switzerland) Raffaele Marciello	Pro	537	2nd	2nd
2023	(France) AKKodis ASP Team	89	Mercedes-AMG GT3 Evo	(Brazil) Adalberto Baptista (Brazil) Bruno Baptista (Brazil) Rodrigo Baptista (Brazil) Alan Hellmeister	Bronze	353	Ret	Ret
