= Ezequiel Pérez Companc =

Argentine racing driver

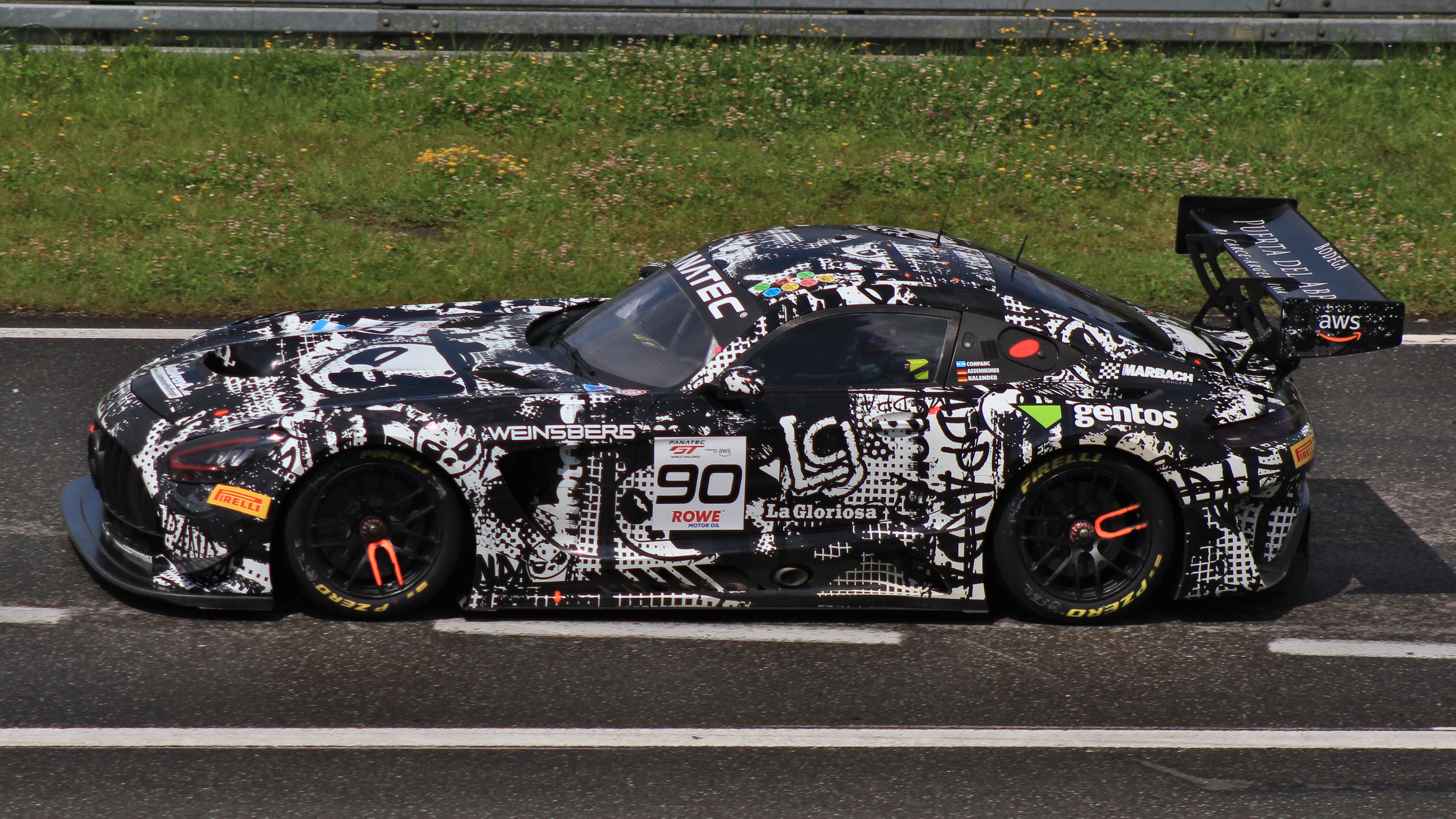
- Nationality: (Argentina) Argentine
- Born: 5 July 1994 (age 32) Buenos Aires, Argentina
- Relatives: Gregorio Pérez Companc (grandfather); Jorge Pérez Companc (father); Luís Pérez Companc (uncle); Pablo Pérez Companc (uncle)

Blancpain GT World Challenge Europe
- Categorisation: FIA Silver
- Years active: 2016–2019
- Teams: Belgian Audi Club Team WRT
- Starts: 14
- Wins: 0
- Poles: 0
- Fastest laps: 1
- Best finish: 10th in 2017

Championship titles
- 2014: Ferrari Challenge Europe – Trofeo Pirelli (Pro-Am)

Ezequiel Pérez Companc (born 5 July 1994 in Buenos Aires) is an Argentine racing driver. He currently competes in the GT World Challenge Europe for Saintéloc Racing.

He belongs to the prominent Pérez Companc family, being the son of Jorge and grandson of the Argentine businessman Gregorio Pérez Companc. Holding an FIA Silver rating, he has driven for sports car operations such as GRT Grasser Racing Team and Belgian Audi Club Team WRT. In 2020, he established his own racing team, Madpanda Motorsport, where he serves as team principal and primary driver.

== Racing career ==
=== Career start in circuit racing (2013–2019) ===
Pérez Companc entered professional sports car racing in 2013. The following year, he won the 2014 Ferrari Challenge Europe Am championship with Motor Piacenza and placed third in class at the Ferrari Challenge World Final. In 2015, he graduated to the International GT Open with Baporo Motorsport, scoring five GT3 Pro-Am class victories on his way to third in the final standings.

Between 2016 and 2018, he competed in the Blancpain GT Series (now GT World Challenge Europe) and ADAC GT Masters for the Austrian squad GRT Grasser Racing Team, driving a Lamborghini Huracán GT3. For 2019, he joined Belgian Audi Club Team WRT to pilot an Audi R8 LMS GT3 Evo in the Endurance Cup alongside Dries Vanthoor and Alex Riberas. His 2019 season was cut short during the Paul Ricard 1000km on June 1, where a 230 km/h collision with a Ferrari 488 GT3 at Signes corner left him with a fractured lumbar vertebra and spinal edema, requiring a lengthy recovery in Argentina.

=== Madpanda Motorsport (2020–present) ===
On 13 January 2020, Pérez Companc launched Madpanda Motorsport, a Barcelona-based GT3 team supported technically by QEV Technologies. Acting as driver and team principal, he piloted the team's Mercedes-AMG GT3 Evo to a runner-up finish in the 2020 GT World Challenge Europe Sprint Cup Silver standings.

=== 2020 E-Sports transition during injury recovery ===
Following his severe spinal injury at Paul Ricard in late 2019, Pérez Companc utilized sim racing to remain competitive during his physical rehabilitation and the subsequent motor racing hiatus caused by the COVID-19 pandemic. On 29 March 2020, he entered the SRO E-Sport GT Series Charity Challenge, a high-profile sim racing event held on Assetto Corsa Competizione at the virtual Monza circuit aimed at raising funds for the COVID-19 Solidarity Response Fund.

Competing in a field that mixed professional esports sim racers with top-tier GT World Challenge Europe factory drivers, Pérez Companc advanced through the knockout stages into the grand final. He ultimately finished the final race as the third-highest-placed real-world professional driver (behind Lamborghini factory driver Dennis Lind and Saintéloc Racing's Simon Gachet), placing ahead of several established international GT competitors.

=== Off-road expansion (2022–present) ===
He diversified into off-road racing and electric disciplines later in his career. In October 2022, he signed with XITE ENERGY Racing to substitute for Timo Scheider at the Extreme E season finale in Punta del Este, Uruguay, partnering Tamara Molinaro and becoming the first South American driver to enter the championship. In February 2026, he paired with his father Jorge under the Madpanda Motorsport banner to enter the Africa Eco Race, a 5,900-kilometer cross-country rally raid from Morocco to Senegal. The duo won the Historic category overall of the 2026 Africa Eco Race driving a 1993 Toyota Land Cruiser HDJ80.

== Racing record ==
=== Career summary ===
| Season | Series | Team | Races | Wins | Poles | F/Laps | Podiums | Points | Position |
|---|---|---|---|---|---|---|---|---|---|
| 2013 | Ferrari Challenge Europe - Trofeo Pirelli | | 2 | 0 | 0 | 0 | 0 | 22 | 14th |
| 2014 | Ferrari Challenge Europe - Trofeo Pirelli (Am) | Motor Piacenza | 14 | 2 | 3 | 2 | 9 | 175 | **1st** |
| 2014 | Ferrari Challenge Finali Mondiali - Trofeo Pirelli (Am) | Motor Piacenza | 1 | 0 | 1 | 0 | 1 | N/A | **3rd** |
| 2015 | International GT Open - Pro-Am | AF Corse | 14 | 5 | 0 | 0 | 6 | 72 | **3rd** |
| 2016 | Blancpain GT Series Endurance Cup | AF Corse | 4 | 0 | 0 | 0 | 0 | 0 | NC |
| 2016 | Blancpain GT Series Sprint Cup | AF Corse | 6 | 0 | 0 | 0 | 0 | 2 | 28th |
| 2017 | Blancpain GT Series Sprint Cup | GRT Grasser Racing Team | 9 | 0 | 0 | 0 | 3 | 26 | 10th |
| 2017 | Blancpain GT Series Endurance Cup | GRT Grasser Racing Team | 5 | 0 | 0 | 0 | 0 | 0 | NC |
| 2017 | ADAC GT Masters | GRT Grasser Racing Team | 12 | 1 | 2 | 1 | 2 | 55 | 18th |
| 2017 | Intercontinental GT Challenge | GRT Grasser Racing Team | 1 | 0 | 0 | 0 | 0 | 0 | NC |
| 2017 | IMSA SportsCar Championship - GTD | GRT Grasser Racing Team | 1 | 0 | 0 | 0 | 0 | 16 | 73rd |
| 2017 | 24H Series - A6 | GRT Grasser Racing Team | | | | | | | |
| 2018 | Blancpain GT Series Sprint Cup | GRT Grasser Racing Team | 10 | 0 | 0 | 0 | 2 | 37 | 9th |
| 2018 | Blancpain GT Series Endurance Cup | GRT Grasser Racing Team | 5 | 0 | 0 | 0 | 0 | 8 | 38th |
| 2018 | ADAC GT Masters | GRT Grasser Racing Team | 14 | 1 | 1 | 1 | 1 | 33 | 19th |
| 2018 | IMSA SportsCar Championship - GTD | GRT Grasser Racing Team | 1 | 0 | 0 | 0 | 0 | 18 | 57th |
| 2018 | FIA GT Nations Cup | Team Argentina | 3 | 0 | 0 | 0 | 0 | N/A | 10th |
| 2019 | Blancpain GT Series Endurance Cup | Belgian Audi Club Team WRT | 4 | 0 | 0 | 0 | 1 | 15 | 17th |
| 2019 | ADAC GT Masters | PROpeak Performance | 2 | 0 | 0 | 0 | 0 | 0 | NC |
| 2019 | International GT Open | Lazarus Racing | 2 | 0 | 0 | 0 | 0 | 0 | 48th |
| 2019 | IMSA SportsCar Championship - GTD | Starworks Motorsport | 2 | 0 | 0 | 0 | 0 | 35 | 43rd |
| 2020 | GT World Challenge Europe Endurance Cup | Madpanda Motorsport | 4 | 0 | 0 | 0 | 0 | 0 | NC |
| 2020 | GT World Challenge Europe Sprint Cup | Madpanda Motorsport | 10 | 0 | 0 | 0 | 0 | 5.5 | 20th |
| 2021 | GT World Challenge Europe Endurance Cup | Madpanda Motorsport | 5 | 0 | 0 | 0 | 0 | 1 | 31st |
| 2021 | GT World Challenge Europe Sprint Cup | Madpanda Motorsport | 10 | 0 | 0 | 0 | 0 | 19 | 18th |
| 2022 | ADAC GT Masters | Madpanda Motorsport | 10 | 0 | 0 | 0 | 0 | 16 | 30th |
| 2022 | GT World Challenge Europe Endurance Cup | Madpanda Motorsport | 5 | 0 | 0 | 0 | 0 | 0 | NC |
| 2022 | GT World Challenge Europe Sprint Cup | Madpanda Motorsport | 2 | 0 | 0 | 0 | 0 | 6 | 17th |
| 2022 | Extreme E | Xite Energy Racing | 1 | 0 | 0 | 0 | 0 | 4 | 20th |
| 2023 | GT World Challenge Europe Endurance Cup | Madpanda Motorsport | 5 | 0 | 0 | 0 | 0 | 0 | NC |
| 2023 | GT World Challenge Europe Sprint Cup | Madpanda Motorsport | 10 | 0 | 0 | 0 | 0 | 0 | NC |
| 2024 | GT World Challenge Europe Endurance Cup | Madpanda Motorsport | 3 | 0 | 0 | 0 | 0 | 0 | NC |
| 2024 | GT World Challenge Europe Endurance Cup | Saintéloc Racing | 2 | 0 | 0 | 0 | 0 | 0 | NC |
| 2024 | GT World Challenge Europe Sprint Cup | Madpanda Motorsport | 8 | 0 | 0 | 0 | 0 | 4.5 | 17th |
| 2024 | GT World Challenge Europe Sprint Cup | Saintéloc Racing | 2 | 0 | 0 | 0 | 0 | 4.5 | 17th |
| 2024 | GT World Challenge Europe Sprint Cup – Silver | Madpanda Motorsport | 2 | 1 | 1 | 0 | 1 | 32.5 | 9th |
| 2024 | GT World Challenge Europe Sprint Cup – Silver | Saintéloc Racing | 2 | 0 | 0 | 0 | 0 | 32.5 | 9th |
| 2025 | GT World Challenge Europe Endurance Cup | Tresor Attempto Racing | 3 | 0 | 0 | 0 | 0 | 0 | NC |
| 2025 | GT World Challenge Europe Sprint Cup | Tresor Attempto Racing | 8 | 0 | 0 | 0 | 0 | 9.5 | 16th |
| 2026 | GT World Challenge Europe Endurance Cup | Saintéloc Racing | 5 | 0 | 0 | 0 | 0 | 0 | NC |

=== Complete GT World Challenge results ===
==== GT World Challenge Europe Sprint Cup ====
| Year | Team | Car | Class | 1 | 2 | 3 | 4 | 5 | 6 | 7 | 8 | 9 | 10 | Pos. | Points |
|---|---|---|---|---|---|---|---|---|---|---|---|---|---|---|---|
| 2016 | AF Corse | Ferrari 458 Italia GT3 | Pro | MIS; QR; 12 | MIS; CR; 9 | BRH; QR; 26 | BRH; CR; 30 | NÜR; QR; 33 | NÜR; CR; 16 | HUN; QR | HUN; CR | CAT; QR | CAT; CR | 28th | 2 |
| 2017 | GRT Grasser Racing Team | Lamborghini Huracán GT3 | Pro | MIS; QR; Ret | MIS; CR; DNS | BRH; QR; 3 | BRH; CR; Ret | ZOL; QR; 7 | ZOL; CR; 10 | HUN; QR; 21 | HUN; CR; 13 | NÜR; QR; 2 | NÜR; CR; 3 | 10th | 26 |
| 2018 | GRT Grasser Racing Team | Lamborghini Huracán GT3 | Pro | ZOL; 1; 6 | ZOL; 2; 3 | BRH; 1; 12 | BRH; 2 Ret | MIS; 1; 4 | MIS; 2; 20 | HUN; 1; 16 | HUN; 2; 11 | NÜR; 1; 3 | NÜR; 2; 5 | 9th | 37 |
| 2019 | Belgian Audi Club Team WRT | Audi R8 LMS Evo | Pro | BRH; 1; 11 | BRH; 2 Ret | MIS; 1 | MIS; 2 | **ZAN**; **1**; 5 | ZAN; 2; 3 | NÜR; 1; 5 | **NÜR**; **2**; 27 | HUN; 1; 17 | HUN; 2; 16 | 12th | 22.5 |
| 2020 | Madpanda Motorsport | Mercedes-AMG GT3 Evo | Silver | MIS; 1; 16 | MIS; 2; 12 | MIS; 3; 9 | MAG; 1; 17 | MAG; 2; 11 | ZAN; 1; 6 | ZAN; 2; 15 | CAT; 1; 18 | CAT; 2; 11 | **CAT**; **3**; 13 | 2nd | 72.5 |
| 2021 | Madpanda Motorsport | Mercedes-AMG GT3 Evo | Silver | MAG; 1; 4 | MAG; 2; 13 | ZAN; 1 Ret | ZAN; 2; 9 | MIS; 1; 14 | MIS; 2; 14 | BRH; 1; 4 | BRH; 2; 16 | VAL; 1 Ret | VAL; 2; 7 | 7th | 60 |
| 2022 | Madpanda Motorsport | Mercedes-AMG GT3 Evo | Silver | BRH; 1 | BRH; 2 | MAG; 1 | MAG; 2 | ZAN; 1 | ZAN; 2 | MIS; 1 | MIS; 2 | VAL; 1 Ret | VAL; 2; 5 | 13th | 16.5 |
| 2023 | Madpanda Motorsport | Mercedes-AMG GT3 Evo | Silver | BRH; 1; 25 | BRH; 2; 18 | MIS; 1; 16 | MIS; 2; 14 | HOC; 1; 14 | HOC; 2; 17 | VAL; 1; 25 | VAL; 2; 22 | ZAN; 1; 15 | ZAN; 2; 14 | 3rd | 92 |
| 2024 | Madpanda Motorsport | Mercedes-AMG GT3 Evo | Pro | BRH; 1; 19 | BRH; 2; 17 | MIS; 1; 11 | MIS; 2; 8 | HOC; 1 Ret | HOC; 2; 10 | | | | | 17th | 4.5 |
| 2024 | Madpanda Motorsport | Mercedes-AMG GT3 Evo | Silver | | | | | | | **MAG**; **1**; 8 | MAG; 2; 18 | | | 9th | 32.5 |
| 2024 | Saintéloc Racing | Audi R8 LMS Evo II | Silver | | | | | | | | | CAT; 1; 12 | CAT; 2; 17 | 9th | 32.5 |
| 2025 | Tresor Attempto Racing | Audi R8 LMS Evo II | Silver | BRH; 1; 23 | BRH; 2; 11 | **ZAN**; **1**; 10 | ZAN; 2; 6 | **MIS**; **1**; 6 | **MIS**; **2**; 30 | MAG; 1 Ret | MAG; 2; 21 | VAL; 1 | VAL; 2 | 6th | 71 |

^{*}Season still in progress.

==== GT World Challenge Europe Endurance Cup ====
| Year | Team | Car | Class | 1 | 2 | 3 | 4 | 5 | 6 | 7 | Pos. | Points |
|---|---|---|---|---|---|---|---|---|---|---|---|---|
| 2016 | AF Corse | Ferrari 458 Italia GT3 | Pro | MNZ; Ret | SIL; 14 | LEC; Ret | SPA; 6H; 46 | SPA; 12H; 43 | SPA; 24H; 27 | NÜR | NC | 0 |
| 2017 | GRT Grasser Racing Team | Lamborghini Huracán GT3 | Pro | MNZ; Ret | SIL; 17 | LEC; Ret | SPA; 6H; 33 | SPA; 12H; 22 | SPA; 24H; 18 | CAT; 31 | NC | 0 |
| 2018 | GRT Grasser Racing Team | Lamborghini Huracán GT3 | Pro | MNZ; Ret | SIL; 30 | LEC; 17 | SPA; 6H; 19 | SPA; 12H; 19 | SPA; 24H; 14 | CAT; 6 | 38th | 8 |
| 2019 | Belgian Audi Club Team WRT | Audi R8 LMS Evo | Pro | MNZ; 18 | SIL; 3 | LEC; Ret | SPA; 6H | SPA; 12H | SPA; 24H | CAT; 25 | 17th | 15 |
| 2020 | Madpanda Motorsport | Mercedes-AMG GT3 Evo | Silver | IMO; 22 | NÜR; 17 | SPA; 6H; 41 | SPA; 12H; 34 | SPA; 24H; 26 | **LEC**; 25 | | 5th | 50 |
| 2021 | Madpanda Motorsport | Mercedes-AMG GT3 Evo | Silver | MNZ; Ret | LEC; 24 | SPA; 6H; 9 | SPA; 12H; 13 | SPA; 24H; 11 | NÜR; 21 | CAT; 23 | 7th | 57 |
| 2022 | Madpanda Motorsport | Mercedes-AMG GT3 Evo | Silver | IMO; Ret | LEC; Ret | SPA; 6H; 26 | SPA; 12H; 23 | SPA; 24H; 23 | HOC; Ret | CAT; 23 | 17th | 20 |
| 2023 | Madpanda Motorsport | Mercedes-AMG GT3 Evo | Silver | MNZ; 25 | LEC; 22 | SPA; 6H; 39 | SPA; 12H; 54 | SPA; 24H; 39 | NÜR; 48† | CAT; 46† | 5th | 54 |
| 2024 | Madpanda Motorsport | Mercedes-AMG GT3 Evo | Silver | **LEC**; 22 | SPA; 6H; 19 | SPA; 12H; 43 | SPA; 24H; 31 | NÜR; 32 | | | 2nd | 93 |
| 2024 | Saintéloc Racing | Audi R8 LMS Evo II | Silver | | | | | | MNZ; 29 | **JED**; 13 | 2nd | 93 |
| 2025 | Tresor Attempto Racing | Audi R8 LMS Evo II | Silver | LEC; 23 | MNZ; 13 | SPA; 6H; 16 | SPA; 12H; 61† | SPA; 24H; Ret | NÜR | CAT | 8th | 42 |
| 2026 | Saintéloc Racing | Audi R8 LMS Evo II | Silver | LEC; 30 | MNZ; 36† | SPA; 6H; 25 | SPA; 12H; 40 | SPA; 24H; 30 | NÜR; Ret | ALG; 24 | 19th | 26 |

^{*}Season still in progress.

=== Complete IMSA SportsCar Championship results ===
(key) (Races in bold indicate pole position; races in italics indicate fastest lap)

| Year | Entrant | Class | Chassis | Engine | 1 | 2 | 3 | 4 | 5 | 6 | 7 | 8 | 9 | 10 | 11 | 12 | Rank | Points |
|---|---|---|---|---|---|---|---|---|---|---|---|---|---|---|---|---|---|---|
| 2017 | GRT Grasser Racing Team | GTD | Lamborghini Huracán GT3 | Lamborghini 5.2 L V10 | DAY; 15 | SEB | LBH | AUS | BEL | WGL | MOS | LIM | ELK | VIR | LGA | PET | 73rd | 16 |
| 2018 | GRT Grasser Racing Team | GTD | Lamborghini Huracán GT3 | Lamborghini 5.2 L V10 | DAY; 13 | SEB | MDO | BEL | WGL | MOS | LIM | ELK | VIR | LGA | PET | | 57th | 18 |
| 2019 | Starworks Motorsport | GTD | Audi R8 LMS Evo | Audi DXR 5.2 L V10 | DAY; 13 | SEB; 14 | MDO | DET | WGL | MOS | LIM | ELK | VIR | LGA | PET | | 43rd | 35 |

=== Complete ADAC GT Masters results ===
(key) (Races in bold indicate pole position; races in italics indicate fastest lap)

| Year | Team | Car | 1 | 2 | 3 | 4 | 5 | 6 | 7 | 8 | 9 | 10 | 11 | 12 | 13 | 14 | Pos. | Points |
|---|---|---|---|---|---|---|---|---|---|---|---|---|---|---|---|---|---|---|
| 2017 | GRT Grasser Racing Team | Lamborghini Huracán GT3 | OSC; 1; 13 | OSC; 2; 21 | LAU; 1; 3 | **LAU**; **2**; 1 | RBR; 1; 21 | RBR; 2; 8 | ZAN; 1; 22 | **ZAN**; **2** Ret | NÜR; 1; 10 | NÜR; 2; 9 | SAC; 1 | SAC; 2 | HOC; 1 Ret | HOC; 2; 6 | 18th | 55 |
| 2018 | GRT Grasser Racing Team | Lamborghini Huracán GT3 | OSC; 1 DSQ | OSC; 2; 23 | MST; 1 Ret | MST; 2 Ret | RBR; 1; 29 | RBR; 2; 6 | NÜR; 1; 24 | NÜR; 2; 22 | **ZAN**; **1**; 1 | ZAN; 2 Ret | SAC; 1; 14 | SAC; 2 Ret | HOC; 1 Ret | HOC; 2; 18 | 19th | 33 |
| 2019 | PROpeak Performance | Aston Martin Vantage AMR GT3 | OSC; 1 | OSC; 2 | MST; 1 | MST; 2 | RBR; 1 | RBR; 2 | ZAN; 1; 21 | ZAN; 2; 29 | NÜR; 1 | NÜR; 2 | HOC; 1 | HOC; 2 | SAC; 1 | SAC; 2 | NC | 0 |
| 2022 | Madpanda Motorsport | Mercedes-AMG GT3 Evo | OSC; 1; 19 | OSC; 2; 20 | RBR; 1; 19 | RBR; 2; 20 | ZAN; 1; 15 | ZAN; 2; 12 | NÜR; 1; 16 | NÜR; 2; 5 | LAU; 1; 19 | LAU; 2; 19† | SAC; 1 | SAC; 2 | HOC; 1 | HOC; 2 | 30th | 16 |

=== FIA GT Nations Cup results ===
| Year | Country (Team) | Co-Driver | Car | Laps | Pos. |
|---|---|---|---|---|---|
| 2018 | Argentina (HB Racing) | (Argentina) José Manuel Balbiani | Lamborghini Huracán GT3 | 27 | 10th |

=== Complete Extreme E results ===
(key)

| Year | Team | Car | 1 | 2 | 3 | 4 | 5 | Pos. | Points |
|---|---|---|---|---|---|---|---|---|---|
| 2022 | Xite Energy Racing | Spark ODYSSEY 21 | DES | ISL1 | ISL2 | COP | ENE; 8 | 20th | 4 |
