= 2018 FIA GT Nations Cup =

Race details
Date	1 December 2018
Official name	Bahrain GT Festival
Location	Bahrain International Circuit, Sakhir, Bahrain
Course	Permanent racing facility 5.412 km (3.363 mi)
Distance	Qualifying Race 1; 60 minutes Qualifying Race 2; 60 minutes Main Race; 60 minutes
- Qualifying Race 1

Pole
Driver	(Belgium) Mike den Tandt	Belgium
Time	2:01.397

Fastest lap
Driver	(Belgium) Mike den Tandt	Belgium
Time	2:02.538 (on lap 6)

Podium
First	(Belgium) Mike den Tandt (Belgium) Charles Weerts	Belgium
Second	(Turkey) Ayhancan Güven (Turkey) Salih Yoluç	Turkey
Third	(Italy) Matteo Cressoni (Italy) Piergiuseppe Perazzini	Italy
- Qualifying Race 2

Pole
Driver	(Belgium) Charles Weerts	Belgium
Time	2:00.136

Fastest lap
Driver	(France) Jim Pla	France
Time	2:03.816 (on lap 5)

Podium
First	(Turkey) Ayhancan Güven (Turkey) Salih Yoluç	Turkey
Second	(United Kingdom) Chris Buncombe (United Kingdom) Chris Froggatt	United Kingdom
Third	(Germany) Nico Bastian (Germany) Alexander Mattschull	Germany
- Main Race

Pole
Driver	(Turkey) Salih Yoluç	Turkey

Fastest lap
Driver	(Turkey) Ayhancan Güven	Turkey
Time	2:02.379 (on lap 18)

Podium
First	(Turkey) Ayhancan Güven (Turkey) Salih Yoluç	Turkey
Second	(United Kingdom) Chris Buncombe (United Kingdom) Chris Froggatt	United Kingdom
Third	(Denmark) Johnny Laursen (Denmark) Nicklas Nielsen	Denmark

The 2018 FIA GT Nations Cup was the first edition of the pro–am FIA GT Nations Cup Grand Touring (GT) sports car race held at the Bahrain International Circuit in Sakhir, Bahrain on 1 December 2018. The race was contested with GT3-spec cars entered by teams representing nations. Only Silver and Bronze-rated drivers were allowed to compete. The event promoters were the Bahrain Motorsport Federation (BMF) and the SRO Motorsports Group (SRO). For the following year the event was reformatted into the multi-discipline FIA Motorsport Games.

The duo representing Turkey Ayhancan Güven and Salih Yoluç won the main race sharing a Mercedes-AMG GT3 run by Ram Racing from pole position after scoring the fewest number of points in the two preceding qualification races. Turkey led the start of the race before being overtaken by the United Kingdom team of Chris Buncombe and Chris Froggatt. The nation was able to reclaim the lead from the United Kingdom and maintained it to win the FIA GT Nations Cup by three seconds. Denmark's pair of Johnny Larsen and Nicklas Nielsen completed the podium in third position.

== Background and entry list ==
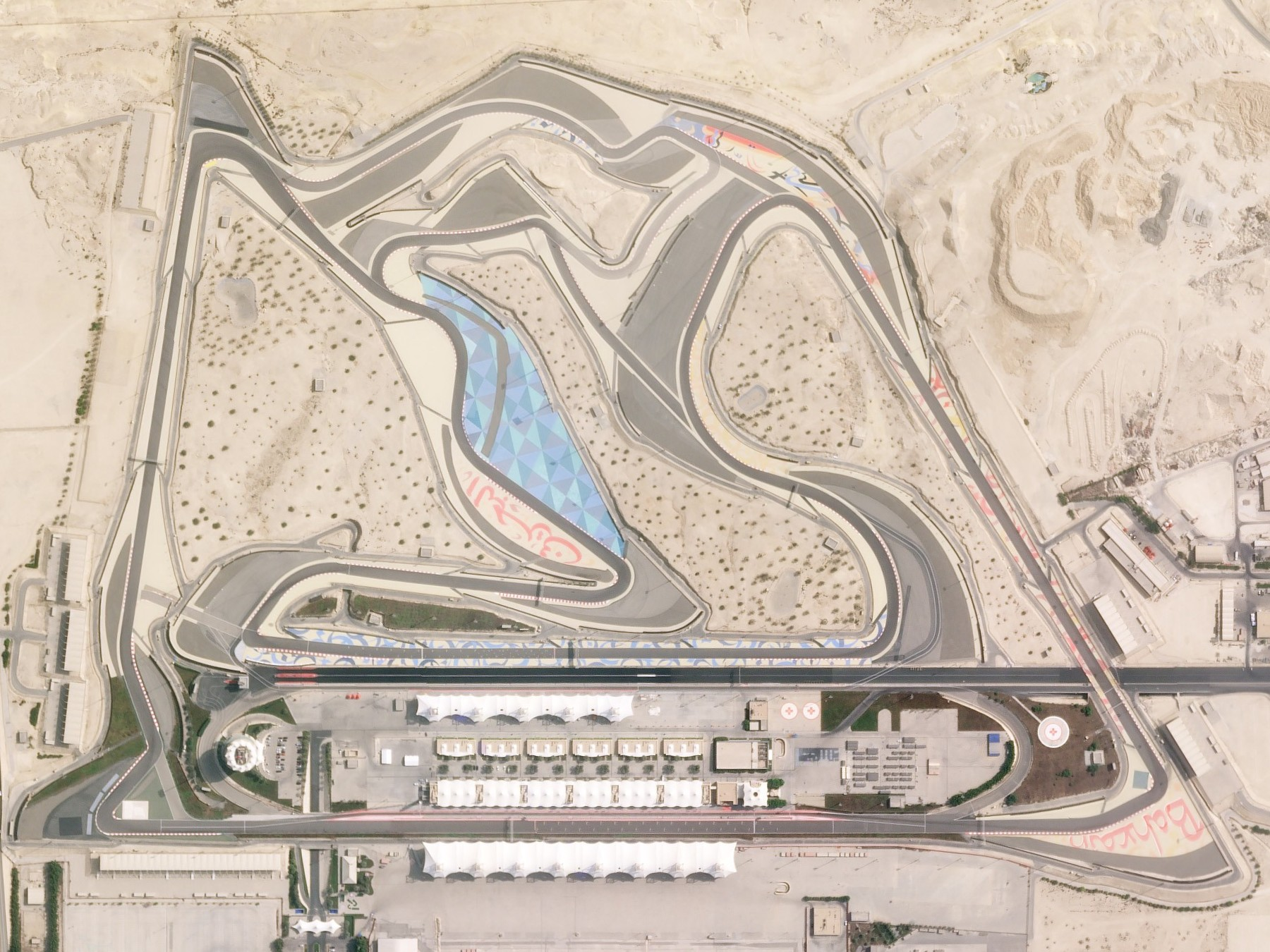
An aerial view of the Bahrain International Circuit, where the race was held.

The SRO Motorsports Group (SRO) CEO Stéphane Ratel proposed the organisation of a pro–am GT3 Cup of Nations race for the global GT3 car category as a separate event from the FIA GT World Cup in Macau be held in October 2018 at the Sochi Autodrom in Russia to the Fédération Internationale de l'Automobile (FIA; motor racing's governing body). This followed amateur drivers being barred from competing in the race in Macau as a consequence of numerous crashes. The FIA World Motor Sport Council approved the concept at a meeting in Geneva in March 2018, and the FIA GT Nations Cup was organised by the SRO at the 15-turn 5.412 km (3.363 mi) Bahrain International Circuit in Sakhir, Bahrain from 30 November to 1 December 2018, the first SRO-sanctioned race in the country since the final round of the 2005 FIA GT Championship. It was part of the Bahrain GT Festival that also included the GT4 International Cup and the Bahrain Classic Challenge racing series. The event was scheduled to be held on a different race circuit every year but was reformatted into the multi-discipline FIA Motorsport Games in 2019.

Drivers had to have competed in an FIA-regulated championship race based on GT3 regulations in the previous two seasons or have significant experience in Grand Touring (GT) cars to enter the race. Silver and bronze-rated drivers were allowed into the race but not gold or platinum-rated competitors. Drivers had to apply through their national sporting authority before they were accepted and each car were piloted by two drivers (one Bronze entrant and a Silver competitor) holding the same passport of the country they represented. Although teams did not have to come from the same nation as their drivers, they were allowed to enter multiple cars though only one car per country was permitted.

The final entry list composed of 18 car teams of two drivers each was published on 9 November 2018. Teams fielded GT3 cars from Audi, Ferrari, Lamborghini, Nissan, Mercedes-AMG, McLaren and Porsche and entrants came from countries in Asia, Australasia, Europe, North America and South America. The race winners received a medal following the race's conclusion to be in line with other national sports events. Pirelli was the race's official tyre supplier. Each team received five sets of tyres for the event but were not allowed to perform tyre changes during the race unless a puncture was sustained or if it was necessary to switch to rain tyres. All teams were required to switch drivers halfway through the main race. The event was livestreamed on the FIA's website.

== Practice and qualifying ==
Two 80-minute practice sessions were held in the morning and afternoon of 30 November. The first practice session was led by Argentina with a time of 2:02.835 set by driver Ezequiel Pérez Companc in a Lamborghini Huracán GT3 fielded by HB Racing. He was 0.078 seconds faster than the second-placed Jim Pla for France. Positions three to five were occupied by Italy, Belgium and the United Kingdom. Belarus's Alexander Talkanitsa Sr caused the session to be stopped in the final minutes when he went off the circuit and sustained damage to his Ferrari at turn seven. Germany and Russia's entries run by Rinaldi Racing did not participate in the session with their Ferrari 488 GT3s still in shipping containers because of delays clearing customs in Dubai. Turkey's Ayhancan Güven was quickest in the second practice session with a lap time of 2:01.565 set 30 minutes in. Denmark set the second-fastest time late in the session, ahead of France's Jean-Luc Beaubelique in third. Mexico and Belgium rounded out the top five.

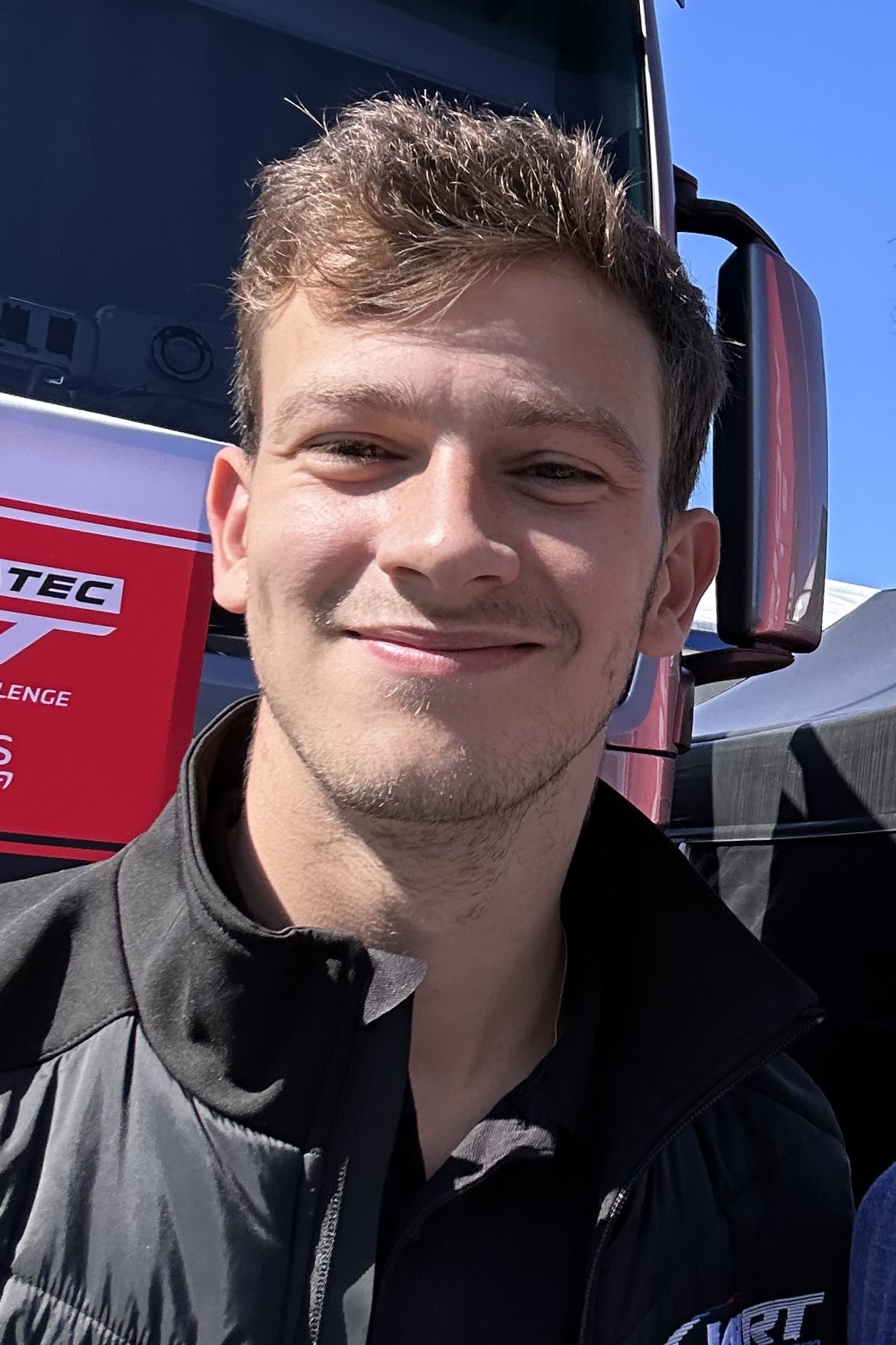
Charles Weerts (pictured in 2023) secured a qualifying sweep for Belgium by taking pole position in the second qualifying session.

Two 20-minute qualifying sessions were held in the afternoon. All Bronze-rated drivers set lap times in the first session to set the starting order for the first qualifying race. Each squad's Silver-rated driver recorded lap times in the second session to determine the starting grid for the second qualifying race. The first session was a duel between Belgium and the United Kingdom. Mike den Tandt took pole position for the first qualifying event for Belgium with a lap time of 2:01.397. Chris Buncombe qualified the United Kingdom squad 0.353 seconds down in second position and Argentina's José Manuel Balbiani secured third in the session's final minutes. Turkey's Salih Yoluç set a lap late in the session to qualify fourth. Yoluç demoted Thailand's Piti Bhirombhakdi to fifth. Positions six to ten were occupied by Belarus, Sweden, Italy, Hong Kong and Mexico. The final starting positions were taken by Denmark, Germany. France, Russia, Australia, China, Malaysia and Japan. The second session was led by Charles Weerts in his maiden GT race with a 2:00.136 lap to complete a qualifying sweep for Belgium. Denmark's Nicklas Nielsen qualified in second, ahead of Güven of Turkey, France's Pla and Italy's Matteo Cressoni in the following three places. The United Kingdom, Argentina, China, Germany and Sweden completed the top ten. The grid was completed by Russia, Belarus, Australia, Hong Kong, Malaysia, Thailand, Mexico and Japan. Each of the 18 cars partook in the two qualifying sessions.

Pole positions in each qualifying session are denoted in bold.

=== First qualifying session classification ===
Final classification of the first qualifying session
Pos.	No.	Team	Operator	Qualifying	Grid
1	**8**	**Belgium**	Belgian Audi Club Team WRT	**2:01.397**	1
2	93	United Kingdom	AF Corse	2:01.750	2
3	18	Argentina	HB Racing	2:02.120	3
4	34	Turkey	Ram Racing	2:02.573	4
5	39	Thailand	Kessel Racing TP12	2:02.771	5
6	17	Belarus	AT Racing	2:03.175	6
7	188	Sweden	Garage 59	2:03.237	7
8	11	Italy	AF Corse	2:03.411	8
9	20	Hong Kong	KCMG	2:03.467	9
10	15	Mexico	Squadra Corse Garage Italia	2:03.483	10
11	16	Denmark	Formula Racing	2:03.526	11
12	333	Germany	Rinaldi Racing	2:03.559	12
13	87	France	AKKA-ASP Team	2:03.977	13
14	993	Russia	Rinaldi Racing	2:04.083	14
15	911	Australia	Herberth Motorsport	2:04.980	15
16	910	China	Herberth Motorsport	2:05.102	16
17	69	Malaysia	Axle Motorsport	2:05.441	17
18	12	Japan	AF Corse	2:06.334	18

=== Second qualifying session classification ===
Final classification of the second qualifying session
Pos.	No.	Team	Operator	Qualifying	Grid
1	**8**	**Belgium**	Belgian Audi Club Team WRT	**2:00.136**	1
2	16	Denmark	Formula Racing	2:00.646	2
3	34	Turkey	Ram Racing	2:00.686	3
4	87	France	AKKA-ASP Team	2:00.758	4
5	11	Italy	AF Corse	2:00.957	5
6	93	United Kingdom	AF Corse	2:01.077	6
7	18	Argentina	HB Racing	2:01.207	7
8	910	China	Herberth Motorsport	2:01.842	8
9	333	Germany	Rinaldi Racing	2:01.860	9
10	188	Sweden	Garage 59	2:01.928	10
11	993	Russia	Rinaldi Racing	2:02.293	11
12	17	Belarus	AT Racing	2:02.412	12
13	911	Australia	Herberth Motorsport	2:02.599	13
14	20	Hong Kong	KCMG	2:02.767	14
15	69	Malaysia	Axle Motorsport	2:02.776	15
16	39	Thailand	Kessel Racing TP12	2:02.977	16
17	15	Mexico	Squadra Corse Garage Italia	2:03.325	17
18	12	Japan	AF Corse	2:07.747	18

== Qualifying races ==
There were two one-hour qualifying races to set the starting order for the main race through a points-scoring system. Each entry, including all retirements, tallied points based on its finishing position. The winner of each qualifying race earned one point and the second-place finisher received two points. The points total from both qualifying races were combined to set the starting order for the main race, with pole position being awarded to the entry with the fewest points scored. Should two cars have earned the same number of points, then the car that set the fastest race lap from either qualifying race would be ahead of the other. Cars that did not start one or two qualifying races were required to start at the rear of the grid.

The first qualifying race commenced at 19:30 local time on 30 November. At the first corner, Thailand's Bhirombhakdi braked late and collided with the United Kingdom car of Buncombe, who spun around. With Buncombe facing in the opposite direction, he was hit by Sweden's Alexander West and Denmark's Johnny Laursen. The Denmark car was forced to retire with front-end damage and the safety car was deployed. The safety car was on track for ten minutes before racing resumed. Belgium's Den Tandt pulled away from the rest of the field while the Thailand team was issued a drive through penalty and dropped to the rear of the field. Buncombe slalomed through the field to move the United Kingdom entry from 17th to fourth position on a new set of tyres the car started the race on during his stint. Argentina's Manuel Balbiani moved forward slightly and crashed into the rear of the Hong Kong entry while attempting to exit his car because the car was still active and in first gear. Yoluç moved the Turkey car to third after passing the Hong Kong and Mexico entries before being relieved by Güven during the pit stop phase. The Mexico team had a slow pit stop and dropped out of the top ten places. The United Kingdom's Chris Froggatt fell behind Güven and hit the Turkey entry at the first corner in an attempt at an overtaking manoevure while leaving the pit lane. Güven was now in second for Turkey and pulled away from Froggatt, who was passed for third by Italy's Cressoni with two minutes left. Weerts took over the Belgium entry from Den Tandt and maintained the car's lead for the remainder of the race to win after leading every lap. Turkey finished 24.855 seconds behind in second and the podium was completed by Italy in third. The United Kingdom, France, Argentina, Russia, Germany, Hong Kong, Belarus, Sweden, China, Australia, Malaysia, Mexico, Japan and Thailand were the final classified finishers.

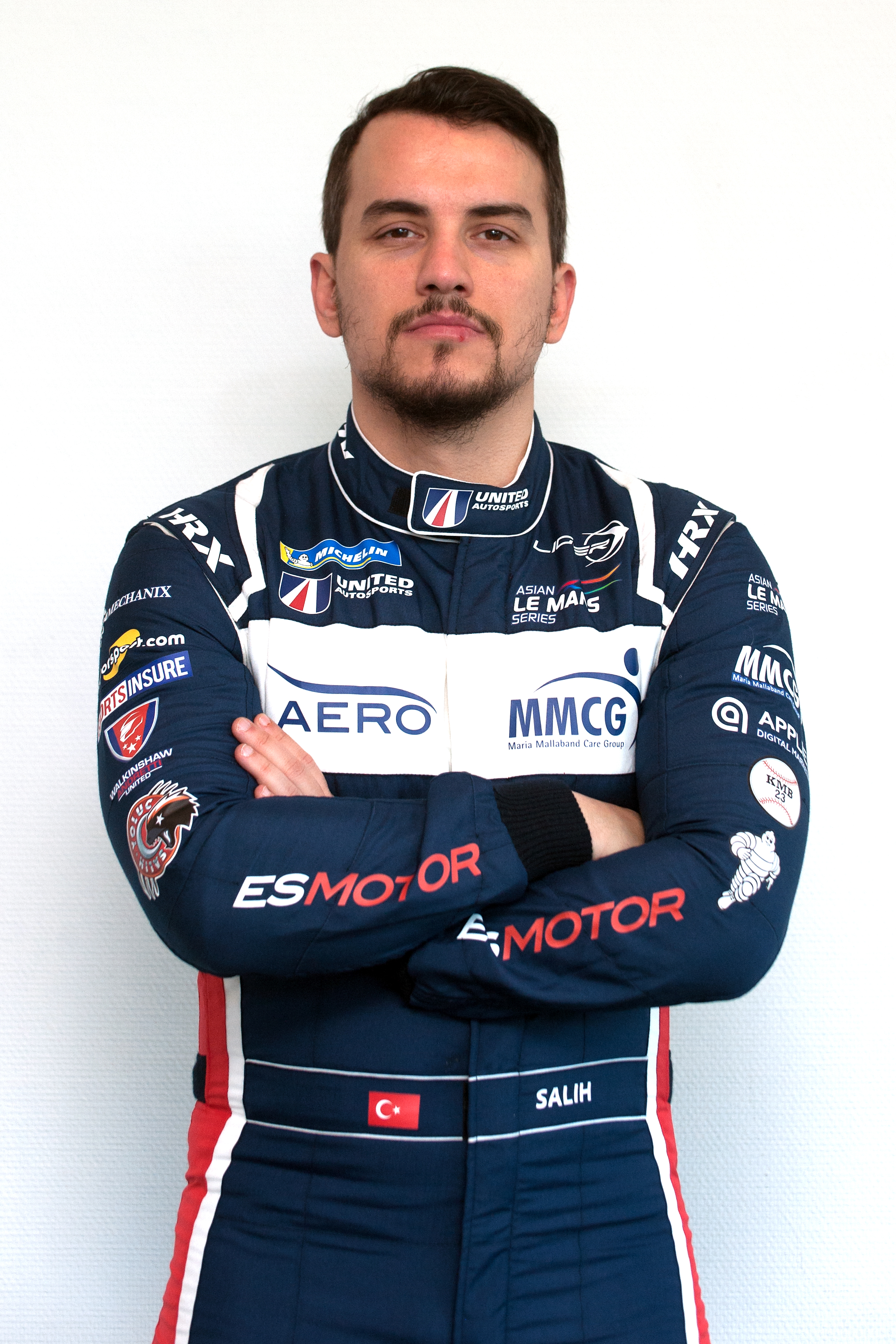
Salih Yoluç helped Turkey to win the second qualifying race and secure pole position for the main race.

The second qualifying race began at 13:15 local time on 1 December. Turkey's Güven took the lead from the pole-sitting Belgium entry of Weerts at the first corner after the latter made a slow start. Weerts lost more positions on the drive into turn one and then lost control of his car in the turn and dropped to the rear of the field. Güven was involved in a battle for the race lead with France's Pla in the first half of the race and also with Denmark's Larsen. The Belgium entry sustained a right-rear puncture in the second half of the race. This ended the team's challenge to gain positions and the safety car was deployed for ten minutes to clear debris from the circuit. Den Tandt was required to make a pit stop to replace the puncture and fell one lap behind the race leader. Just following the restart, Jean-Luc Beaubelique lost control of the France entry and dropped out of the top ten. This promoted Germany's Alexander Mattschull to second and he maintained the position until Buncombe's United Kingdom entry overtook him with an aggressive pass late in the race. The Italian Ferrari was the race's only retirement following a spin that burnt out the clutch. Yoluç had relieved Güven and maintained Turkey's lead to win the second qualifying race. The United Kingdom were 1.943 seconds behind in second and Germany completed the podium in third. Russia, Mexico, Denmark, Thailand, Belarus, China, Australia, Sweden, France, Malaysia, Hong Kong, Belgium, Japan and Italy were the final classified finishers.

After the qualifying races, the grid for the main race lined up as Turkey on pole position, followed by the United Kingdom, Argentina, Germany, Russia, Belgium, France, Mexico, Italy, China. Sweden, Australia, Hong Kong, Belarus, Denmark, Thailand, Malaysia and Japan.

=== Qualifying race 1 classification ===
Final classification of the first qualifying race
Pos	No.	Team	Operator	Licence	Drivers	Car	Laps	Gap/Retired
1	8	Belgium	Belgian Audi Club Team WRT	B	Mike den Tandt (BEL)	Audi R8 LMS	27	1:00:11.639
1	8	Belgium	Belgian Audi Club Team WRT	S	Charles Weerts (BEL)	Audi R8 LMS	27	1:00:11.639
2	34	Turkey	Ram Racing	S	Ayhancan Güven (TUR)	Mercedes-AMG GT3	27	+24.855
2	34	Turkey	Ram Racing	B	Salih Yoluç (TUR)	Mercedes-AMG GT3	27	+24.855
3	11	Italy	AF Corse	S	Matteo Cressoni (ITA)	Ferrari 488 GT3	27	+37.023
3	11	Italy	AF Corse	B	Piergiuseppe Perazzini (ITA)	Ferrari 488 GT3	27	+37.023
4	93	United Kingdom	AF Corse	B	Chris Buncombe (GBR)	Ferrari 488 GT3	27	+39.296
4	93	United Kingdom	AF Corse	S	Chris Froggatt (GBR)	Ferrari 488 GT3	27	+39.296
5	87	France	AKKA-ASP Team	B	Jean-Luc Beaubelique (FRA)	Mercedes-AMG GT3	27	+43.945
5	87	France	AKKA-ASP Team	S	Jim Pla (FRA)	Mercedes-AMG GT3	27	+43.945
6	18	Argentina	HB Racing	B	José Manuel Balbiani (ARG)	Lamborghini Huracán GT3	27	+52.410
6	18	Argentina	HB Racing	S	Ezequiel Pérez Companc (ARG)	Lamborghini Huracán GT3	27	+52.410
7	993	Russia	Rinaldi Racing	S	Denis Bulatov (RUS)	Ferrari 488 GT3	27	+57.252
7	993	Russia	Rinaldi Racing	B	Rinat Salikhov (RUS)	Ferrari 488 GT3	27	+57.252
8	333	Germany	Rinaldi Racing	S	Nico Bastian (DEU)	Ferrari 488 GT3	27	+58.790
8	333	Germany	Rinaldi Racing	B	Alexander Mattschull (DEU)	Ferrari 488 GT3	27	+58.790
9	20	Hong Kong	KCMG	B	Alex Au (HKG)	Nissan GT-R Nismo GT3	27	+1:07.463
9	20	Hong Kong	KCMG	S	Andy Yan (HKG)	Nissan GT-R Nismo GT3	27	+1:07.463
10	17	Belarus	AT Racing	B	Alexander Talkanitsa Sr. (BLR)	Ferrari 488 GT3	27	+1:13.132
10	17	Belarus	AT Racing	S	Alexander Talkanitsa Jr. (BLR)	Ferrari 488 GT3	27	+1:13.132
11	188	Sweden	Garage 59	S	Victor Bouveng (SWE)	McLaren 650S GT3	27	+1:23.008
11	188	Sweden	Garage 59	B	Alexander West (SWE)	McLaren 650S GT3	27	+1:23.008
12	910	China	Herberth Motorsport	B	Li Chao (CHN)	Porsche 911 GT3 R	27	+1:25.797
12	910	China	Herberth Motorsport	S	Leo Ye (CHN)	Porsche 911 GT3 R	27	+1:25.797
13	911	Australia	Herberth Motorsport	S	Brenton Grove (AUS)	Porsche 911 GT3 R	27	+1:26.153
13	911	Australia	Herberth Motorsport	B	Stephen Grove (AUS)	Porsche 911 GT3 R	27	+1:26.153
14	69	Malaysia	Axle Motorsport	S	Mitchell Cheah (MYS)	Audi R8 LMS	27	+1:35.715
14	69	Malaysia	Axle Motorsport	B	Zen Low (MYS)	Audi R8 LMS	27	+1:35.715
15	15	Mexico	Squadra Corse Garage Italia	B	Martin Fuentes (MEX)	Ferrari 488 GT3	26	+1:39.068
15	15	Mexico	Squadra Corse Garage Italia	S	Ricardo Pérez de Lara (MEX)	Ferrari 488 GT3	26	+1:39.068
16	12	Japan	AF Corse	B	Tamotsu Kondo (JPN)	Ferrari 488 GT3	26	+1 Lap
16	12	Japan	AF Corse	B	Ken Seto (JPN)	Ferrari 488 GT3	26	+1 Lap
17	39	Thailand	Kessel Racing TP12	B	Piti Bhirombhakdi (THA)	Ferrari 488 GT3	25	+2 Laps
17	39	Thailand	Kessel Racing TP12	S	Pasin Lathouras (THA)	Ferrari 488 GT3	25	+2 Laps
Ret	16	Denmark	Formula Racing	B	Johnny Laursen (DNK)	Ferrari 488 GT3	1	Retired
Ret	16	Denmark	Formula Racing	S	Nicklas Nielsen (DNK)	Ferrari 488 GT3	1	Retired

Categorisation
Icon	Class
S	Silver
B	Bronze

=== Qualifying race 2 classification ===
Final classification of the second qualifying race
Pos	No.	Team	Operator	Licence	Drivers	Car	Laps	Gap/Retired
1	34	Turkey	Ram Racing	S	Ayhancan Güven (TUR)	Mercedes-AMG GT3	27	1:00:33.755
1	34	Turkey	Ram Racing	B	Salih Yoluç (TUR)	Mercedes-AMG GT3	27	1:00:33.755
2	93	United Kingdom	AF Corse	B	Chris Buncombe (GBR)	Ferrari 488 GT3	27	+1.943
2	93	United Kingdom	AF Corse	S	Chris Froggatt (GBR)	Ferrari 488 GT3	27	+1.943
3	333	Germany	Rinaldi Racing	S	Nico Bastian (DEU)	Ferrari 488 GT3	27	+5.291
3	333	Germany	Rinaldi Racing	B	Alexander Mattschull (DEU)	Ferrari 488 GT3	27	+5.291
4	993	Russia	Rinaldi Racing	S	Denis Bulatov (RUS)	Ferrari 488 GT3	27	+6.329
4	993	Russia	Rinaldi Racing	B	Rinat Salikhov (RUS)	Ferrari 488 GT3	27	+6.329
5	18	Argentina	HB Racing	B	José Manuel Balbiani (ARG)	Lamborghini Huracán GT3	27	+8.410
5	18	Argentina	HB Racing	S	Ezequiel Pérez Companc (ARG)	Lamborghini Huracán GT3	27	+8.410
6	15	Mexico	Squadra Corse Garage Italia	B	Martin Fuentes (MEX)	Ferrari 488 GT3	26	+16.463
6	15	Mexico	Squadra Corse Garage Italia	S	Ricardo Pérez de Lara (MEX)	Ferrari 488 GT3	26	+16.463
7	16	Denmark	Formula Racing	B	Johnny Laursen (DNK)	Ferrari 488 GT3	27	+18.139
7	16	Denmark	Formula Racing	S	Nicklas Nielsen (DNK)	Ferrari 488 GT3	27	+18.139
8	39	Thailand	Kessel Racing TP12	B	Piti Bhirombhakdi (THA)	Ferrari 488 GT3	27	+20.819
8	39	Thailand	Kessel Racing TP12	S	Pasin Lathouras (THA)	Ferrari 488 GT3	27	+20.819
9	17	Belarus	AT Racing	B	Alexander Talkanitsa Sr. (BLR)	Ferrari 488 GT3	27	+21.332
9	17	Belarus	AT Racing	S	Alexander Talkanitsa Jr. (BLR)	Ferrari 488 GT3	27	+21.332
10	910	China	Herberth Motorsport	B	Li Chao (CHN)	Porsche 911 GT3 R	27	+23.555
10	910	China	Herberth Motorsport	S	Leo Ye (CHN)	Porsche 911 GT3 R	27	+23.555
11	911	Australia	Herberth Motorsport	S	Brenton Grove (AUS)	Porsche 911 GT3 R	27	+24.320
11	911	Australia	Herberth Motorsport	B	Stephen Grove (AUS)	Porsche 911 GT3 R	27	+24.320
12	188	Sweden	Garage 59	S	Victor Bouveng (SWE)	McLaren 650S GT3	27	+25.322
12	188	Sweden	Garage 59	B	Alexander West (SWE)	McLaren 650S GT3	27	+25.322
13	87	France	AKKA-ASP Team	B	Jean-Luc Beaubelique (FRA)	Mercedes-AMG GT3	27	+29.118
13	87	France	AKKA-ASP Team	S	Jim Pla (FRA)	Mercedes-AMG GT3	27	+29.118
14	69	Malaysia	Axle Motorsport	S	Mitchell Cheah (MYS)	Audi R8 LMS	27	+33.039
14	69	Malaysia	Axle Motorsport	B	Zen Low (MYS)	Audi R8 LMS	27	+33.039
15	20	Hong Kong	KCMG	B	Alex Au (HKG)	Nissan GT-R Nismo GT3	27	+37.443
15	20	Hong Kong	KCMG	S	Andy Yan (HKG)	Nissan GT-R Nismo GT3	27	+37.443
16	8	Belgium	Belgian Audi Club Team WRT	B	Mike den Tandt (BEL)	Audi R8 LMS	26	+1 Lap
16	8	Belgium	Belgian Audi Club Team WRT	S	Charles Weerts (BEL)	Audi R8 LMS	26	+1 Lap
17	12	Japan	AF Corse	B	Tamotsu Kondo (JPN)	Ferrari 488 GT3	26	+1 Lap
17	12	Japan	AF Corse	B	Ken Seto (JPN)	Ferrari 488 GT3	26	+1 Lap
18	11	Italy	AF Corse	S	Matteo Cressoni (ITA)	Ferrari 488 GT3	23	+4 Laps
18	11	Italy	AF Corse	B	Piergiuseppe Perazzini (ITA)	Ferrari 488 GT3	23	+4 Laps

== Main race ==
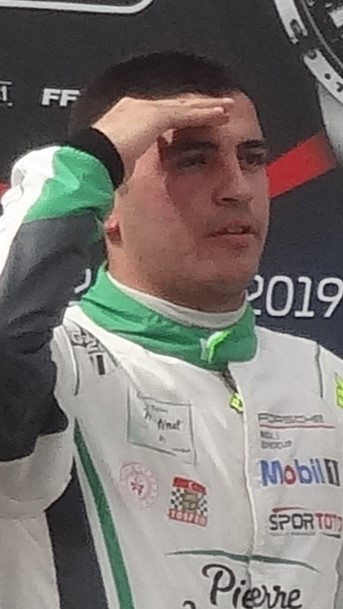
Ayhancan Güven (pictured in 2019) passed the United Kingdom's Chris Buncombe in the main race to win the FIA GT Nations Cup for Turkey.

The main race commenced at 19:30 local time on 30 November. Yoluç maintained the race lead for Turkey going into the first corner. Belgium's Den Tandy was separated by the entries representing Mexico (Ricardo Pérez de Lara) and Russia (Rinat Salikhov) on the drive to the first corner and collided with both of them. The Belgian Audi went through grass before stopping in the gravel trap. Australia's Stephen Grove collided with the rear of Alexander Talkanitsa Sr's Belarus entry in turn one, sending Takanitsa into the outside trackside barriers. Both cars were forced to retire from the race. Further around the lap, the Argentina car of Manuel Balbiani was spun following a collision with France's Beaubelique. Other teams that retired on the first lap were Germany and Sweden's West. This meant the safety car was deployed before the first lap was completed. Six laps and 15 minutes passed by under safety car conditions as the circuit was cleared of the stricken vehicles.

When the race resumed, Turkey's Yoluç held the lead from the United Kingdom's Froggatt until Froggatt made minor contact with the Turkey car and overtook Yoluç for the position at turn seven. Salikhov then overtook Turkey's Yoluç to take second for Russia and was involved in a battle for the position with Yoluç. Froggatt pulled away from the rest of the field and led for the United Kingdom by more than ten seconds by the time of the pit stop phase while Russia was holding off Turkey and Hong Kong. The pit stop cycle did not change the race order at first as Buncombe maintained the race lead but his advantage over Güven was reduced because the United Kingdom's car was unbalanced that meant he was unable to extract the same pace as he was able to do in the two qualifying races. Güven passed the Russia entry for second and then closed up and overtook Buncombe with 12 minutes remaining to reclaim the race lead for Turkey after a duel. Güven maintained the race lead for the rest of the main to claim the FIA GT Nations Cup for Turkey. The United Kingdom finished 3.311 seconds behind in second. Denmark's Johnny Laursen avoided the first lap incidents and Nielsen overtaking Hong Kong into turn one and then Russia's Denis Bulatov in the final minutes secured Denmark third place. Russia, China, Italy, Hong Kong, Malaysia, Thailand, Argentina, Japan and Mexico were the final finishing nations. France retired after completing 19 laps following driver Beaubelique serving a drive-through penalty for the earlier collision with the Argentine entry.

=== Main race classification ===
Final classification of the main race
Pos	No.	Team	Operator	Licence	Drivers	Car	Laps	Gap/Retired	Grid
1	34	Turkey	Ram Racing	S	Ayhancan Güven (TUR)	Mercedes-AMG GT3	27	1:01:06.096	1
1	34	Turkey	Ram Racing	B	Salih Yoluç (TUR)	Mercedes-AMG GT3	27	1:01:06.096	1
2	93	United Kingdom	AF Corse	B	Chris Buncombe (GBR)	Ferrari 488 GT3	27	+3.311	2
2	93	United Kingdom	AF Corse	S	Chris Froggatt (GBR)	Ferrari 488 GT3	27	+3.311	2
3	16	Denmark	Formula Racing	B	Johnny Laursen (DNK)	Ferrari 488 GT3	27	+4.459	15
3	16	Denmark	Formula Racing	S	Nicklas Nielsen (DNK)	Ferrari 488 GT3	27	+4.459	15
4	993	Russia	Rinaldi Racing	S	Denis Bulatov (RUS)	Ferrari 488 GT3	27	+11.288	5
4	993	Russia	Rinaldi Racing	B	Rinat Salikhov (RUS)	Ferrari 488 GT3	27	+11.288	5
5	910	China	Herberth Motorsport	B	Li Chao (CHN)	Porsche 911 GT3 R	27	+22.138	10
5	910	China	Herberth Motorsport	S	Leo Ye (CHN)	Porsche 911 GT3 R	27	+22.138	10
6	11	Italy	AF Corse	S	Matteo Cressoni (ITA)	Ferrari 488 GT3	23	+27.047	9
6	11	Italy	AF Corse	B	Piergiuseppe Perazzini (ITA)	Ferrari 488 GT3	23	+27.047	9
7	20	Hong Kong	KCMG	B	Alex Au (HKG)	Nissan GT-R Nismo GT3	27	+35.142	13
7	20	Hong Kong	KCMG	S	Andy Yan (HKG)	Nissan GT-R Nismo GT3	27	+35.142	13
8	69	Malaysia	Axle Motorsport	S	Mitchell Cheah (MYS)	Audi R8 LMS	27	+45.288	17
8	69	Malaysia	Axle Motorsport	B	Zen Low (MYS)	Audi R8 LMS	27	+45.288	17
9	39	Thailand	Kessel Racing TP12	B	Piti Bhirombhakdi (THA)	Ferrari 488 GT3	27	+1:16.675	16
9	39	Thailand	Kessel Racing TP12	S	Pasin Lathouras (THA)	Ferrari 488 GT3	27	+1:16.675	16
10	18	Argentina	HB Racing	B	José Manuel Balbiani (ARG)	Lamborghini Huracán GT3	27	+1:35.798	3
10	18	Argentina	HB Racing	S	Ezequiel Pérez Companc (ARG)	Lamborghini Huracán GT3	27	+1:35.798	3
11	12	Japan	AF Corse	B	Tamotsu Kondo (JPN)	Ferrari 488 GT3	26	+1 Lap	18
11	12	Japan	AF Corse	B	Ken Seto (JPN)	Ferrari 488 GT3	26	+1 Lap	18
12	15	Mexico	Squadra Corse Garage Italia	B	Martin Fuentes (MEX)	Ferrari 488 GT3	26	+1 Lap	8
12	15	Mexico	Squadra Corse Garage Italia	S	Ricardo Pérez de Lara (MEX)	Ferrari 488 GT3	26	+1 Lap	8
Ret	87	France	AKKA-ASP Team	B	Jean-Luc Beaubelique (FRA)	Mercedes-AMG GT3	19	Retired	7
Ret	87	France	AKKA-ASP Team	S	Jim Pla (FRA)	Mercedes-AMG GT3	19	Retired	7
Ret	188	Sweden	Garage 59	S	Victor Bouveng (SWE)	McLaren 650S GT3	2	Retired	11
Ret	188	Sweden	Garage 59	B	Alexander West (SWE)	McLaren 650S GT3	2	Retired	11
Ret	333	Germany	Rinaldi Racing	S	Nico Bastian (DEU)	Ferrari 488 GT3	1	Retired	4
Ret	333	Germany	Rinaldi Racing	B	Alexander Mattschull (DEU)	Ferrari 488 GT3	1	Retired	4
Ret	8	Belgium	Belgian Audi Club Team WRT	B	Mike den Tandt (BEL)	Audi R8 LMS	1	Retired	6
Ret	8	Belgium	Belgian Audi Club Team WRT	S	Charles Weerts (BEL)	Audi R8 LMS	1	Retired	6
Ret	911	Australia	Herberth Motorsport	S	Brenton Grove (AUS)	Porsche 911 GT3 R	1	Retired	12
Ret	911	Australia	Herberth Motorsport	B	Stephen Grove (AUS)	Porsche 911 GT3 R	1	Retired	12
Ret	17	Belarus	AT Racing	B	Alexander Talkanitsa Sr. (BLR)	Ferrari 488 GT3	1	Retired	14
Ret	17	Belarus	AT Racing	S	Alexander Talkanitsa Jr. (BLR)	Ferrari 488 GT3	1	Retired	14

== See also ==
- 2018 GT4 International Cup
