= Alexander Mattschull =

German racing driver (born 1972)

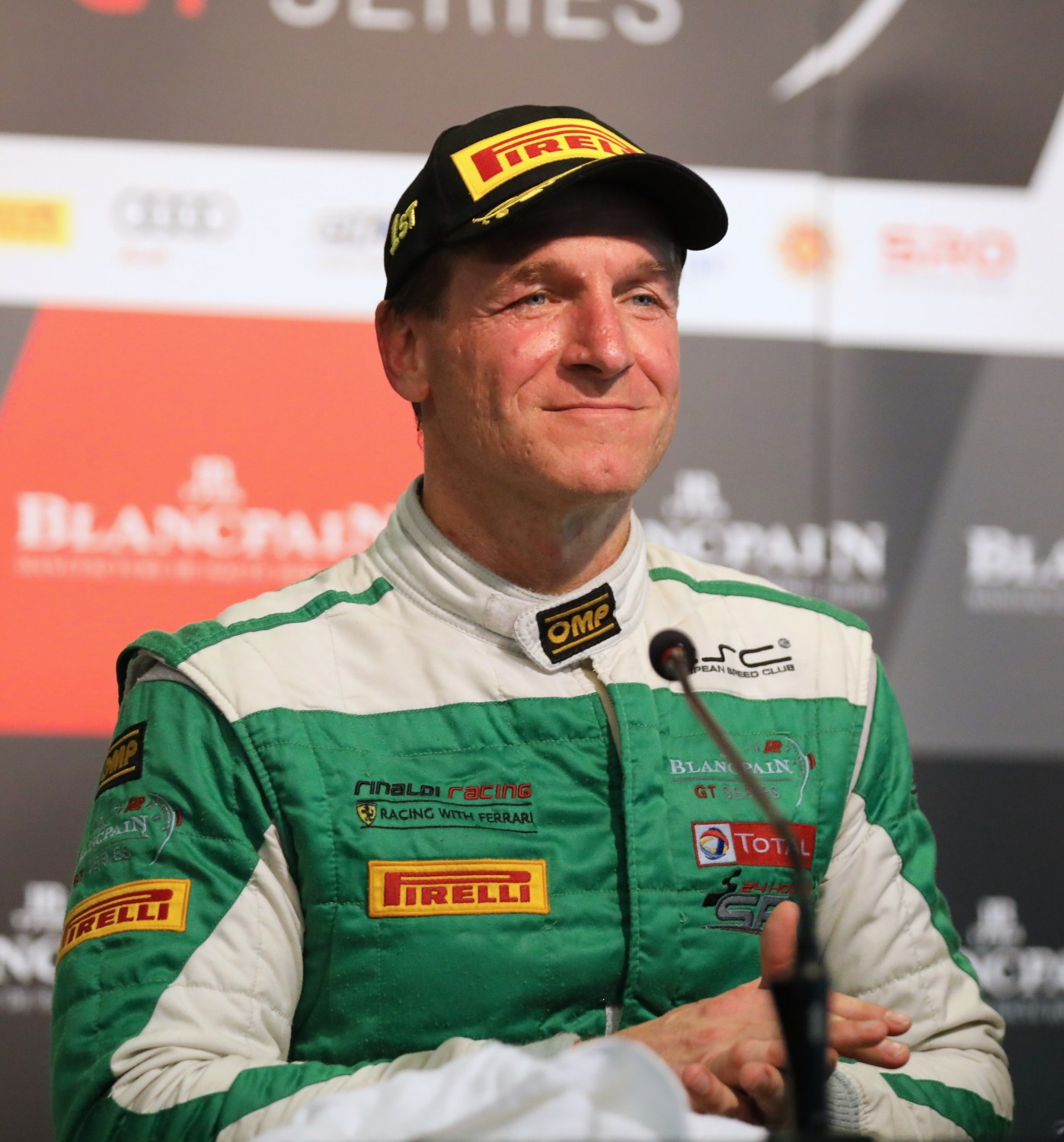
- Mattschull in 2018
- Nationality: (Germany) German
- Born: 2 March 1972 (age 54) Friedrichsdorf, Germany
- Categorisation: FIA Silver (until 2013); FIA Bronze (2014–)

Championship titles
- 2022 2017 2017: Le Mans Cup – LMP3; Blancpain GT Series – Pro-Am; Blancpain GT Series Sprint Cup – Pro-Am

Alexander Mattschull (born 2 March 1972) is a German businessman racing driver who last competed in the LMP2 class of the Asian Le Mans Series for DKR Engineering.

== Personal life and business career ==
Mattschull is the son of Arnold Mattschull, a former racing driver and former CEO of Takko Fashion. Alexander became co-CEO of the company in 2018, before being promoted to CEO as his father joined the company's advisory board. In the first quarter of 2021, the younger Mattschull left the company.

== Racing career ==
Mattschull began his car racing career in 1991, mainly competing in Porsche one-make series until 1995, most notably also racing in the 1994 BPR 4 Hours of Paul Ricard and the 1995 24 Hours of Daytona. Returning to racing in 2010, Mattschull primarily raced at the Nürburgring until 2013, which included his debut in the Blancpain Endurance Series for GT Corse in 2013 at the same venue, in which he scored a Gentleman class podium.

Returning to GT Corse by Rinaldi for 2014, Mattschull began the year by finishing fourth overall at the Dubai 24 Hour. Continuing with them for the rest of the year in the Blancpain Endurance Series, Mattschull took Am class wins at Monza, Silverstone and Le Castellet to secure runner-up honors in class. After a part-time season for Car Collection Motorsport in 2015, Mattschull joined Rinaldi Racing for the following season. Competing in the Pro-Am class in all but one race, Mattschull scored a class win at the Nürburgring and a podium at Monza to end the year ninth in the Pro-Am standings.

Continuing with Rinaldi Racing for 2017, Mattschull raced with them in both the Blancpain GT Series Endurance and Sprint Cups. In the former, Mattschull scored a class podium at Barcelona to finish 10th in the Pro-Am standings, while in the latter, he won all but three races in class to seal the Pro-Am title at the Nürburgring finale. Returning with the German team to race in the Endurance Cup the following year, Mattschull took class wins at Monza and the 24 Hours of Spa en route to a third-place points finish in Pro-Am. During 2018, Mattschull also raced in Blancpain GT Series Asia for GruppeM Racing Team, taking an overall win at Buriram, as well as a class win at Fuji along with three class podiums to take fifth in the GT3 Pro-Am standings. Towards the end of the year, Mattschull also represented Germany in the only edition of the FIA GT Nations Cup.

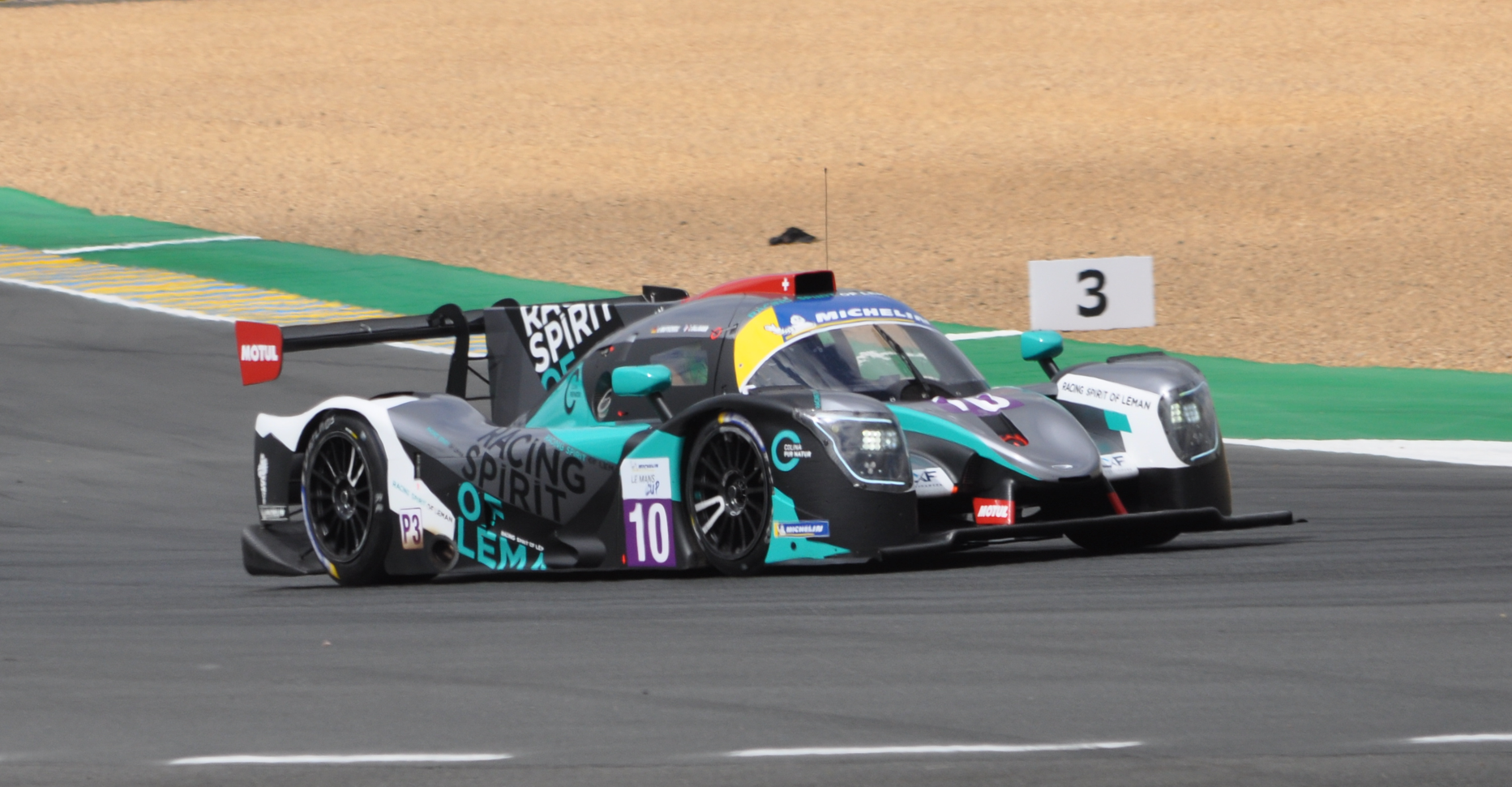
Mattschull was crowned Le Mans Cup champion in 2022 alongside Tom Dillmann.

After winning the 2019 24 Hours of Spa in the Am class with Rinaldi, Mattschull remained with the team for 2020 as they made their debut in the LMP3 class of the Le Mans Cup. In his first season in the series, Mattschull scored a best result of fifth at Algarve alongside Nicolás Varrone as he ended the year 17th in the standings. Continuing with Rinaldi alongside Varrone for 2021, the pair took three second-place finishes between the Monza and Le Mans rounds as they finished third in points. Having been set to race in the LMP3 class of the European Le Mans Series for Team Virage in 2022, Mattschull elected to remain in the Le Mans Cup for a third season as he joined Racing Spirit of Léman alongside Tom Dillmann. Alongside the Frenchman, Mattschull opened up the season by winning at Le Castellet and race one at Le Mans, before winning at Monza and finishing third at Algarve to clinch the LMP3 title.

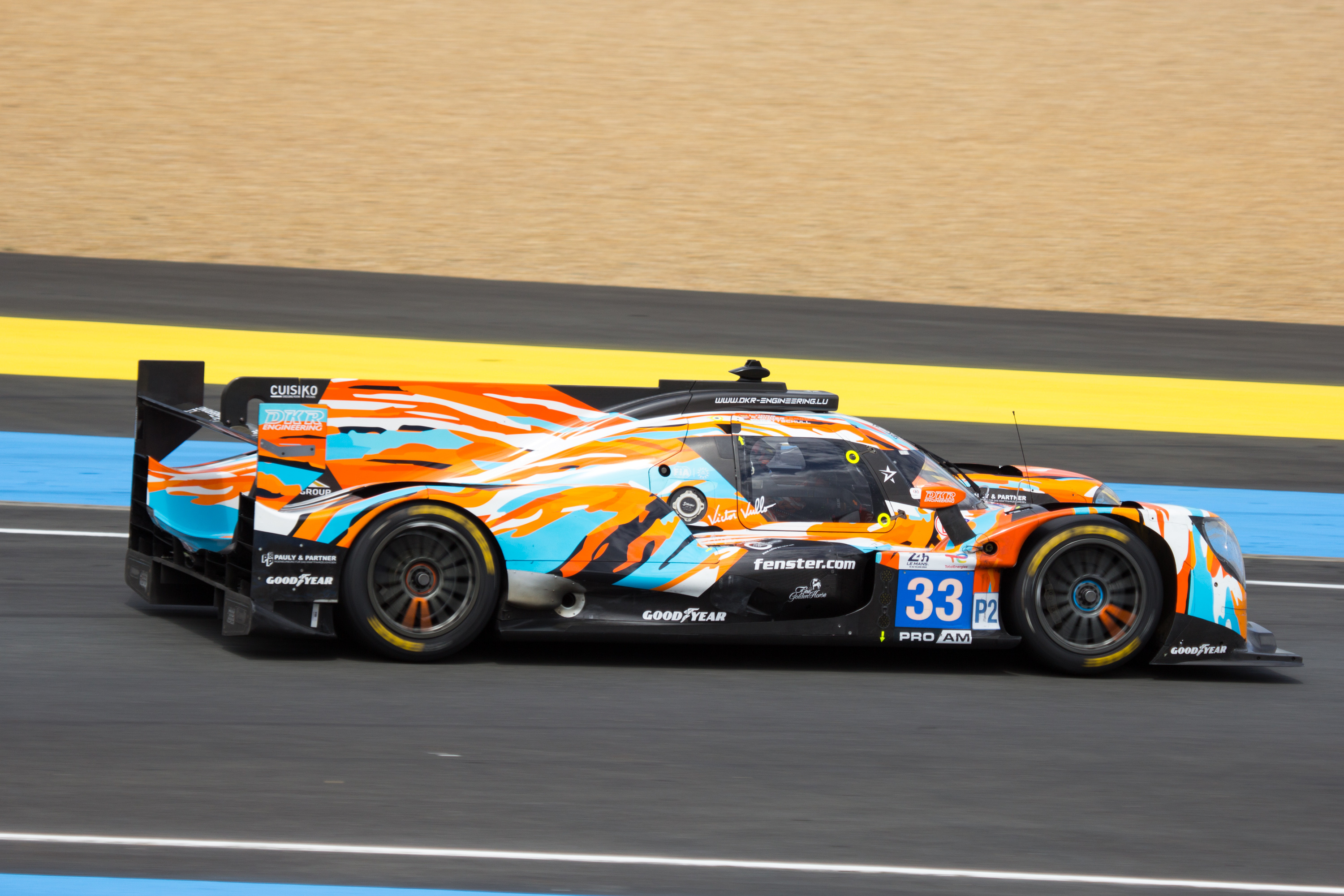
Mattschull racing for DKR Engineering at the 2024 24 Hours of Le Mans.

Mattschull then raced in the LMP2 Pro-Am class of the following year's European Le Mans Series season, before then joining DKR Engineering to compete in the 2023–24 Asian Le Mans Series in LMP2. In his first season in the series, Mattschull scored two third-place finishes at Sepang and Abu Dhabi to take fifth in points. Remaining with DKR to race in the LMP3 class of the European Le Mans Series for the rest of 2024, Mattschull took a lone podium at Le Castellet en route to a sixth-place points finish. During 2024, Mattschull also raced at the 24 Hours of Le Mans for the same team, finishing third in the LMP2 Pro-Am class. At the end of the year, Mattschull joined Proton Competition to race in the 2024–25 Asian Le Mans Series, in which he scored a best result of fifth in both races at Abu Dhabi.

Having not raced for most of 2025 and only appearing as a reserve entry for the 24 Hours of Le Mans for DKR, Mattschull stayed with the Luxembourgish team to race in the 2025–26 Asian Le Mans Series, taking a lone win at Abu Dhabi to take fifth in the LMP2 standings. Following that, Mattschull was slated to compete for the team at the 2026 24 Hours of Le Mans in LMP2 Pro-Am, but was replaced by John Farano before the event.

== Racing record ==
=== Racing career summary ===
Season	Series	Team	Races	Wins	Poles	F/Laps	Podiums	Points	Position
1991	Formula Ford 1600 Germany								
1992	24 Hours of Nürburgring – Class 14	Heico Dienstleistungen	1	0	0	0	0	—N/a	DNF
1993	Porsche Carrera Cup Germany	Mühlbauer Motorsport						79	7th
1993	Porsche Supercup								
1993	24 Hours of Nürburgring – Class 1	Mühlbauer Motorsport	1	0	0	0	0	—N/a	10th
1994	Porsche Carrera Cup Germany	Chinin Mühlbauer Motorsport							
1994	4 Hours of Le Castellet – GT4	Mühlbauer Motorsport	1	1	0	0	1	—N/a	**1st**
1995	24 Hours of Daytona – GTS-2	Daytona Racing	1	0	0	0	0	—N/a	DNF
1995	Porsche Carrera Cup Germany							68	8th
2010	24 Hours of Nürburgring – SP4T	CC Car Collection	1	0	0	0	0	—N/a	9th
2011	Ferrari Challenge Europe – Trofeo Pirelli							80	5th
2013	24 Hours of Nürburgring – SP8	GT Corse	1	0	0	0	0	—N/a	DNF
2013	Blancpain Endurance Series – Gentlemen	GT Corse	1	0	0	0	1	19	22nd
2014	Dubai 24 Hour	GT Corse by Rinaldi	1	0	0	0	0	—N/a	4th
2014	Blancpain Endurance Series – Gentlemen	GT Corse by Rinaldi	5	3	0	4	5	99	**2nd**
2014	VLN Series – SP9	GT Corse by Rinaldi						10.87	42nd
2014	24 Hours of Nürburgring – SP9	GT Corse by Rinaldi	1	0	0	0	0	—N/a	DNF
2015	VLN Series – SP9	Car Collection Motorsport							
2015	Blancpain Endurance Series – Am	Car Collection Motorsport	3	0	1	0	0	20	14th
2015	24 Hours of Nürburgring – SP9	Car Collection Motorsport	1	0	0	0	0	—N/a	DNF
2015	24H Series – A6	Car Collection Motorsport	1	0	0	0	0	0	NC
2015	ADAC GT Masters	Car Collection Motorsport	2	0	0	0	0	0	NC
2016	Blancpain GT Series Endurance Cup	Black Pearl Racing	4	0	0	0	0	10	31st
2016	Blancpain GT Series Endurance Cup	Rinaldi Racing	1	0	0	0	0	10	31st
2016	Blancpain GT Series Endurance Cup – Pro-Am	Black Pearl Racing	4	1	0	0	2	40	9th
2016	Blancpain GT Series Endurance Cup – Am	Rinaldi Racing	1	0	0	0	1	24	17th
2016	Intercontinental GT Challenge – Am	Rinaldi Racing	1	0	0	0	0	0	NC
2016	Blancpain GT Series Sprint Cup	Rinaldi Racing	2	0	0	0	0	0	NC
2016	Blancpain GT Series Sprint Cup – Pro-Am	Rinaldi Racing	2	0	0	0	1	16	8th
2016	24H Series – A6 Pro	Car Collection Motorsport	1	0	0	0	0	0	NC
2017	Blancpain GT Series Sprint Cup	Rinaldi Racing	10	0	0	0	0	0	NC
2017	Blancpain GT Series Sprint Cup – Pro-Am	Rinaldi Racing	10	7	0	0	8	144	**1st**
2017	Blancpain GT Series Endurance Cup	Rinaldi Racing	5	0	0	0	0	0	NC
2017	Blancpain GT Series Endurance Cup – Pro-Am	Rinaldi Racing	5	0	0	0	1	42	10th
2017	Intercontinental GT Challenge	Rinaldi Racing	1	0	0	0	0	0	NC
2018	Blancpain GT Series Endurance Cup	Rinaldi Racing	5	0	0	0	0	0	NC
2018	Blancpain GT Series Endurance Cup – Pro-Am	Rinaldi Racing	5	2	1	0	2	85	**3rd**
2018	Blancpain GT Series Asia – Pro-Am	GruppeM Racing Team	10	2	4	0	5	136	5th
2018	FIA GT Nations Cup	Team Germany	1	0	0	0	0	—N/a	DNF
2019	Blancpain GT Series Endurance Cup	Rinaldi Racing	1	0	0	0	0	0	NC
2019	Blancpain GT Series Endurance Cup – Am	Rinaldi Racing	1	1	1	0	1	38	13th
2019	24 Hours of Nürburgring – SP9	Wochenspiegel Team Monschau	1	0	0	0	0	—N/a	9th
2020	Le Mans Cup – LMP3	Rinaldi Racing	5	0	0	0	0	13	17th
2021	Le Mans Cup – LMP3	Rinaldi Racing	7	0	0	0	3	68	**3rd**
2022	Le Mans Cup – LMP3	Racing Spirit of Léman	7	3	0	0	5	97	**1st**
2023	European Le Mans Series – LMP2 Pro-Am	Team Virage	5	0	0	0	0	22	17th
2023–24	Asian Le Mans Series – LMP2	DKR Engineering	5	0	0	0	2	62	5th
2024	European Le Mans Series – LMP3	DKR Engineering	6	0	1	0	1	53	6th
2024	24 Hours of Le Mans – LMP2 Pro-Am	DKR Engineering	1	0	0	0	1	—N/a	**3rd**
2024–25	Asian Le Mans Series – LMP2	Proton Competition	6	0	0	0	0	26	10th
2025–26	Asian Le Mans Series – LMP2	DKR Engineering	6	1	0	0	1	59	4th

=== Complete GT World Challenge Europe results ===
==== GT World Challenge Europe Endurance Cup ====
Year	Team	Car	Class	1	2	3	4	5	6	7	Pos.	Points
2013	GT Corse	Ferrari 458 Italia GT3	Gentlemen	MNZ	SIL	LEC	SPA; 6H	SPA; 12H	SPA; 24H	NÜR; 22	22nd	19
2014	GT Corse by Rinaldi	Ferrari 458 Italia GT3	Am	MNZ; 17	SIL; 27	LEC; 20	SPA; 6H; Ret	SPA; 12H; Ret	SPA; 24H; Ret	NÜR; 21	2nd	99
2015	Car Collection Motorsport	Mercedes-Benz SLS AMG GT3	Am	MNZ; 42	SIL; 45	LEC	SPA; 6H	SPA; 12H	SPA; 24H	NÜR; 45	14th	20
2016	Black Pearl Racing	Ferrari 488 GT3	Pro-Am	MNZ; 11	SIL; 36	LEC; 38				NÜR; 5	9th	40
2016	Rinaldi Racing	Ferrari 488 GT3	Am				SPA; 6H; 54	SPA; 12H; 45	SPA; 24H; 36		17th	24
2017	Rinaldi Racing	Ferrari 488 GT3	Pro-Am	MNZ; 16	SIL; DSQ	LEC; 19	SPA; 6H; 54	SPA; 12H; 56	SPA; 24H; Ret	CAT; 20	10th	42
2018	Rinaldi Racing	Ferrari 488 GT3	Pro-Am	MNZ; 18	SIL; 41	LEC; Ret	SPA; 6H; 18	SPA; 12H; 21	SPA; 24H; 15	CAT; 27	3rd	85
2019	Rinaldi Racing	Ferrari 488 GT3	Am	MNZ	SIL	LEC	SPA; 6H; 50	SPA; 12H; 35	SPA; 24H; 28	CAT	13th	38

==== GT World Challenge Europe Sprint Cup ====
(key) (Races in bold indicate pole position) (Races in italics indicate fastest lap)

Year	Team	Car	Class	1	2	3	4	5	6	7	8	9	10	Pos.	Points
2016	Rinaldi Racing	Ferrari 458 Italia GT3	Pro-Am	MIS; QR	MIS; CR	BRH; QR	BRH; CR	NÜR; QR	NÜR; CR	HUN; QR	HUN; CR	CAT; QR; 25	CAT; CR; 27	8th	16
2017	Rinaldi Racing	Ferrari 488 GT3	Pro-Am	MIS; QR; 25	MIS; CR; 14	BRH; QR; 19	BRH; CR; 16	ZOL; QR; 19	ZOL; CR; 27	HUN; QR; 18	HUN; CR; 15	**NÜR**; **QR**; 18	NÜR; CR; 18	1st	144

=== Complete GT World Challenge Asia results ===
(key) (Races in bold indicate pole position) (Races in italics indicate fastest lap)

Year	Team	Car	Class	1	2	3	4	5	6	7	8	9	10	11	12	DC	Pts
2018	GruppeM Racing Team	Mercedes-AMG GT3	GT3 Pro-Am	SEP; 1	SEP; 2	**BUR**; **1**; 17	**BUR**; **2**; 1	SUZ; 1; 8	SUZ; 2; 6	FUJ; 1; 17	FUJ; 2; 2	SHA; 1; 14	**SHA**; **2**; 3	ZHE; 1; 14	**ZHE**; **2**; 21	5th	136

=== Complete Le Mans Cup results ===
(key) (Races in bold indicate pole position; results in italics indicate fastest lap)

Year	Entrant	Class	Chassis	1	2	3	4	5	6	7	Rank	Points
2020	Rinaldi Racing	LMP3	Duqueine M30 - D08	RIC; 10	SPA	LEC; 10	LMS; 1; 12	LMS; 2; 13	MNZ	POR; 5	17th	13
2021	Rinaldi Racing	LMP3	Duqueine M30 - D08	BAR; 5	LEC; 6	MNZ; 2	LMS; 1; 2	LMS; 2; 2	SPA; 6	POR; 7	3rd	68
2022	Racing Spirit of Léman	LMP3	Ligier JS P320	LEC; 1	IMO; 12	LMS; 1; 1	LMS; 2; 3	MNZ; 1	SPA; 6	ALG; 3	1st	97

=== Complete European Le Mans Series results ===
(key) (Races in bold indicate pole position; results in italics indicate fastest lap)

Year	Entrant	Class	Chassis	Engine	1	2	3	4	5	6	Rank	Points
2023	Team Virage	LMP2 Pro-Am	Oreca 07	Gibson GK428 4.2 L V8	CAT	LEC; NC	ARA; 6	SPA; 5	**ALG**; 9	POR; 10	17th	22
2024	DKR Engineering	LMP3	Duqueine M30 - D08	Nissan VK56DE 5.6 L V8	CAT; 5	LEC; 2	**IMO**; 6	SPA; 7	MUG; Ret	ALG; 5	6th	53

=== Complete Asian Le Mans Series results ===
(key) (Races in bold indicate pole position) (Races in italics indicate fastest lap)

Year	Team	Class	Car	Engine	1	2	3	4	5	6	Pos.	Points
2023–24	DKR Engineering	LMP2	Oreca 07	Gibson GK428 4.2 L V8	SEP; 1; 3	SEP; 2; 6	DUB; 4	ABU; 1; 3	ABU; 2; 4		5th	62
2024–25	Proton Competition	LMP2	Oreca 07	Gibson GK428 4.2 L V8	SEP; 1; 9	SEP; 2; 10	DUB; 1; 9	DUB; 2 Ret	ABU; 1; 5	ABU; 2; 5	10th	25
2025–26	DKR Engineering	LMP2	Oreca 07	Gibson GK428 4.2 L V8	SEP; 1; 11	SEP; 2; 4	DUB; 1; 8	DUB; 2; 7	ABU; 1; 4	ABU; 2; 1	4th	59

=== Complete 24 Hours of Le Mans results ===
Year	Team	Co-Drivers	Car	Class	Laps	Pos.	Class Pos.
2024	(Luxembourg) DKR Engineering	(Austria) René Binder (Germany) Laurents Hörr	Oreca 07-Gibson	LMP2	195	21st	7th
2024	(Luxembourg) DKR Engineering	(Austria) René Binder (Germany) Laurents Hörr	Oreca 07-Gibson	LMP2 Pro-Am	195	21st	**3rd**
