= 2017 Blancpain GT Series Sprint Cup =

Car racing season

The 2017 Blancpain GT Series Sprint Cup was the fifth season of the Blancpain GT Series Sprint Cup following on from the demise of the SRO Group's FIA GT1 World Championship (an auto racing series for grand tourer cars), the fourth with the designation of Blancpain Sprint Series or Blancpain GT Series Sprint Cup.

== Calendar ==
At the annual press conference during the 2016 24 Hours of Spa on 29 July, the Stéphane Ratel Organisation announced the first draft of the 2017 calendar. The series started at Misano on 2 April and ended at the Nürburgring on 17 September. Zandvoort would make its return on the schedule after a one-year absence, replacing the round in Barcelona, but on 7 November the SRO announced the finalised calendar, confirming Zandvoort had been replaced by Zolder. The finalised calendar also showed the series would return to the Hungaroring.

Event	Circuit	Date	Report
1	Misano World Circuit Marco Simoncelli, Misano Adriatico, Italy	2 April	Report
2	(United Kingdom) Brands Hatch, Kent, Great Britain	7 May	Report
3	Circuit Zolder, Heusden-Zolder, Belgium	4 June	Report
4	Hungaroring, Mogyoród, Hungary	27 August	Report
5	Nürburgring, Nürburg, Germany	17 September	Report

== Entry list ==
Team	Car	No.	Drivers	Class	Rounds
(Belgium) / Belgian Audi Club Team WRT (Note: Cars 1, 2 and 5 entered as Belgian Audi Club Team WRT and cars No. 3 and 17 entered as Team WRT.); (Belgium) / Team WRT	Audi R8 LMS	1	(Belgium) Enzo Ide	P	All
(Belgium) / Belgian Audi Club Team WRT; (Belgium) / Team WRT	Audi R8 LMS	1	(Germany) Christopher Mies	P	1–4
(Belgium) / Belgian Audi Club Team WRT; (Belgium) / Team WRT	Audi R8 LMS	1	(Belgium) Frédéric Vervisch	P	5
(Belgium) / Belgian Audi Club Team WRT; (Belgium) / Team WRT	Audi R8 LMS	2	(United Kingdom) Will Stevens	P	All
(Belgium) / Belgian Audi Club Team WRT; (Belgium) / Team WRT	Audi R8 LMS	2	(Germany) Markus Winkelhock	P	All
(Belgium) / Belgian Audi Club Team WRT; (Belgium) / Team WRT	Audi R8 LMS	3	(United Kingdom) Jake Dennis	P	All
(Belgium) / Belgian Audi Club Team WRT; (Belgium) / Team WRT	Audi R8 LMS	3	(Netherlands) Pieter Schothorst	P	All
(Belgium) / Belgian Audi Club Team WRT; (Belgium) / Team WRT	Audi R8 LMS	5	(Switzerland) Marcel Fässler	P	All
(Belgium) / Belgian Audi Club Team WRT; (Belgium) / Team WRT	Audi R8 LMS	5	(Belgium) Dries Vanthoor	P	All
(Belgium) / Belgian Audi Club Team WRT; (Belgium) / Team WRT	Audi R8 LMS	17	(United Kingdom) Stuart Leonard	P	All
(Belgium) / Belgian Audi Club Team WRT; (Belgium) / Team WRT	Audi R8 LMS	17	(United Kingdom) Jamie Green	P	1
(Belgium) / Belgian Audi Club Team WRT; (Belgium) / Team WRT	Audi R8 LMS	17	(Netherlands) Robin Frijns	P	2–5
(United Kingdom) Bentley Team M-Sport	Bentley Continental GT3	7	(Monaco) Vincent Abril	P	All
(United Kingdom) Bentley Team M-Sport	Bentley Continental GT3	7	(United Kingdom) Steven Kane	P	All
(United Kingdom) Bentley Team M-Sport	Bentley Continental GT3	8	(Spain) Andy Soucek	P	All
(United Kingdom) Bentley Team M-Sport	Bentley Continental GT3	8	(Belgium) Maxime Soulet	P	All
(Switzerland) / Kessel Racing (Note: Cars No. 11 and 888 entered as Kessel Racing and car No. 39 entered as Kessel Racing TP12.); (Switzerland) / Kessel Racing TP12	Ferrari 488 GT3	11	(Poland) Michał Broniszewski	PA	1–3
(Switzerland) / Kessel Racing; (Switzerland) / Kessel Racing TP12	Ferrari 488 GT3	11	(Italy) Giacomo Piccini	PA	1–3
(Switzerland) / Kessel Racing; (Switzerland) / Kessel Racing TP12	Ferrari 488 GT3	39	(Thailand) Piti Bhirombhakdi	PA	All
(Switzerland) / Kessel Racing; (Switzerland) / Kessel Racing TP12	Ferrari 488 GT3	39	(Netherlands) Carlo van Dam	PA	All
(Switzerland) / Kessel Racing; (Switzerland) / Kessel Racing TP12	Ferrari 458 Italia GT3	888	(United States) Stephen Earle	Am	3–5
(Switzerland) / Kessel Racing; (Switzerland) / Kessel Racing TP12	Ferrari 458 Italia GT3	888	(South Africa) David Perel	Am	3–5
(Austria) GRT Grasser Racing Team	Lamborghini Huracán GT3	19	(Argentina) Ezequiel Pérez Companc	P	All
(Austria) GRT Grasser Racing Team	Lamborghini Huracán GT3	19	(Austria) Norbert Siedler	P	1–3
(Austria) GRT Grasser Racing Team	Lamborghini Huracán GT3	19	(Italy) Raffaele Giammaria	P	4
(Austria) GRT Grasser Racing Team	Lamborghini Huracán GT3	19	(Italy) Andrea Caldarelli	P	5
(Austria) GRT Grasser Racing Team	Lamborghini Huracán GT3	63	(Italy) Mirko Bortolotti	P	All
(Austria) GRT Grasser Racing Team	Lamborghini Huracán GT3	63	(Germany) Christian Engelhart	P	All
(Austria) GRT Grasser Racing Team	Lamborghini Huracán GT3	82	(France) Tom Dillmann	P	5
(Austria) GRT Grasser Racing Team	Lamborghini Huracán GT3	82	(Switzerland) Rolf Ineichen	P	5
(Germany) Reiter Young Stars	Lamborghini Gallardo R-EX	24	(Finland) Marko Helistekangas	S	1–2
(Germany) Reiter Young Stars	Lamborghini Gallardo R-EX	24	(Australia) Caitlin Wood	S	1–2
(France) Saintéloc Racing	Audi R8 LMS	26	(Germany) Christopher Haase	P	1–4
(France) Saintéloc Racing	Audi R8 LMS	26	(France) Romain Monti	P	1–4
(France) Saintéloc Racing	Audi R8 LMS	26	(France) Simon Gachet	P	5
(France) Saintéloc Racing	Audi R8 LMS	26	(Germany) Peter Terting	P	5
(Italy) Orange 1 Team Lazarus	Lamborghini Huracán GT3	27	(Colombia) Gustavo Yacamán	P	1–3
(Italy) Orange 1 Team Lazarus	Lamborghini Huracán GT3	27	(Italy) Fabrizio Crestani	P	1–2
(Italy) Orange 1 Team Lazarus	Lamborghini Huracán GT3	27	(Italy) Nicola de Marco	P	3
(Italy) Orange 1 Team Lazarus	Lamborghini Huracán GT3	27	(Italy) Fabrizio Crestani	S	4–5
(Italy) Orange 1 Team Lazarus	Lamborghini Huracán GT3	27	(Germany) Nicolas Pohler	S	4–5
(United Kingdom) / Strakka Motorsport (Note: Car No. 42 entered as Strakka Motorsport and cars No. 43, 44, 58 and 59 entered as Strakka Racing.); (United Kingdom) / Strakka Racing	McLaren 650S GT3	42	(United Kingdom) Lewis Williamson	S	All
(United Kingdom) / Strakka Motorsport; (United Kingdom) / Strakka Racing	McLaren 650S GT3	42	(United Kingdom) Nick Leventis	S	1
(United Kingdom) / Strakka Motorsport; (United Kingdom) / Strakka Racing	McLaren 650S GT3	42	(Italy) David Fumanelli	S	2–3
(United Kingdom) / Strakka Motorsport; (United Kingdom) / Strakka Racing	McLaren 650S GT3	42	(Croatia) Martin Kodrić	S	4–5
(United Kingdom) / Strakka Motorsport; (United Kingdom) / Strakka Racing	McLaren 650S GT3	43	(United Kingdom) Jonny Kane	P	3, 5
(United Kingdom) / Strakka Motorsport; (United Kingdom) / Strakka Racing	McLaren 650S GT3	43	(France) Côme Ledogar	P	3
(United Kingdom) / Strakka Motorsport; (United Kingdom) / Strakka Racing	McLaren 650S GT3	43	(Netherlands) Steijn Schothorst	P	5
(United Kingdom) / Strakka Motorsport; (United Kingdom) / Strakka Racing	McLaren 650S GT3	44	(Netherlands) Loris Hezemans	P	1–2
(United Kingdom) / Strakka Motorsport; (United Kingdom) / Strakka Racing	McLaren 650S GT3	44	(United Kingdom) Jonny Kane	P	1–2
(United Kingdom) / Strakka Motorsport; (United Kingdom) / Strakka Racing	McLaren 650S GT3	58	(United Kingdom) Ben Barnicoat	P	All
(United Kingdom) / Strakka Motorsport; (United Kingdom) / Strakka Racing	McLaren 650S GT3	58	(Portugal) Álvaro Parente	P	1–4
(United Kingdom) / Strakka Motorsport; (United Kingdom) / Strakka Racing	McLaren 650S GT3	58	(France) Côme Ledogar	P	5
(United Kingdom) / Strakka Motorsport; (United Kingdom) / Strakka Racing	McLaren 650S GT3	59	(United Kingdom) Rob Bell	P	All
(United Kingdom) / Strakka Motorsport; (United Kingdom) / Strakka Racing	McLaren 650S GT3	59	(United Kingdom) Andrew Watson	P	All
(Switzerland) Emil Frey Lexus Racing	Lexus RC F GT3	54	(Spain) Albert Costa	P	5
(Switzerland) Emil Frey Lexus Racing	Lexus RC F GT3	54	(Monaco) Stéphane Ortelli	P	5
(Switzerland) Spirit of Race (Note: Car No. 55 entered as Spirit of Race under Swiss licence, but its drivers scored points for AF Corse.)	Ferrari 488 GT3	55	(Italy) Lorenzo Casè	S	All
(Switzerland) Spirit of Race	Ferrari 488 GT3	55	(United Kingdom) Phil Quaife	S	All
(Germany) Attempto Racing	Lamborghini Huracán GT3	66	(Italy) Marco Mapelli	P	1–3
(Germany) Attempto Racing	Lamborghini Huracán GT3	66	(Italy) Giovanni Venturini	P	1–3
(Germany) Attempto Racing	Lamborghini Huracán GT3	66	(Netherlands) Max van Splunteren	S	4–5
(Germany) Attempto Racing	Lamborghini Huracán GT3	66	(Austria) Christopher Zöchling	S	4
(Germany) Attempto Racing	Lamborghini Huracán GT3	66	(Spain) Isaac Tutumlu	S	5
(Germany) Attempto Racing	Lamborghini Huracán GT3	67	(Netherlands) Max van Splunteren	S	1–3
(Germany) Attempto Racing	Lamborghini Huracán GT3	67	(South Africa) Adrian Zaugg	S	1
(Germany) Attempto Racing	Lamborghini Huracán GT3	67	(Germany) Nicolas Pohler	S	2–3
(Germany) Attempto Racing	Porsche 911 GT3 R	67	(Austria) Klaus Bachler	P	4
(Germany) Attempto Racing	Porsche 911 GT3 R	67	(France) Kévin Estre	P	4
(Germany) Kornely Motorsport	Mercedes-AMG GT3	70	(Germany) Kenneth Heyer	PA	1–2
(Germany) Kornely Motorsport	Mercedes-AMG GT3	70	(Japan) Yoshiharu Mori	PA	1–2
(Czech Republic) ISR	Audi R8 LMS	74	(Italy) Kevin Ceccon	P	1–4
(Czech Republic) ISR	Audi R8 LMS	74	(Germany) Frank Stippler	P	1–4
(Czech Republic) ISR	Audi R8 LMS	75	(Czech Republic) Filip Salaquarda	P	1–4
(Czech Republic) ISR	Audi R8 LMS	75	(Austria) Clemens Schmid	P	1–4
(Czech Republic) ISR	Audi R8 LMS	75	(Italy) Kevin Ceccon	P	5
(Czech Republic) ISR	Audi R8 LMS	75	(Germany) Frank Stippler	P	5
(Germany) / Mercedes-AMG Team HTP Motorsport (Note: Car No. 84 entered as Mercedes-AMG Team HTP Motorsport and cars No. 85 and 86 entered as HTP Motorsport.); (Germany) / HTP Motorsport	Mercedes-AMG GT3	84	(Germany) Maximilian Buhk	P	All
(Germany) / Mercedes-AMG Team HTP Motorsport; (Germany) / HTP Motorsport	Mercedes-AMG GT3	84	(France) Franck Perera	P	All
(Germany) / Mercedes-AMG Team HTP Motorsport; (Germany) / HTP Motorsport	Mercedes-AMG GT3	85	(Germany) Fabian Schiller	S	All
(Germany) / Mercedes-AMG Team HTP Motorsport; (Germany) / HTP Motorsport	Mercedes-AMG GT3	85	(Netherlands) Jules Szymkowiak	S	All
(Germany) / Mercedes-AMG Team HTP Motorsport; (Germany) / HTP Motorsport	Mercedes-AMG GT3	86	(Austria) Dominik Baumann	P	All
(Germany) / Mercedes-AMG Team HTP Motorsport; (Germany) / HTP Motorsport	Mercedes-AMG GT3	86	(Sweden) Jimmy Eriksson	P	All
(France) AKKA ASP	Mercedes-AMG GT3	87	(France) Jean-Luc Beaubelique	PA	All
(France) AKKA ASP	Mercedes-AMG GT3	87	(France) Jules Gounon	PA	1–4
(France) AKKA ASP	Mercedes-AMG GT3	87	(France) Tristan Vautier	PA	5
(France) AKKA ASP	Mercedes-AMG GT3	88	(Spain) Daniel Juncadella	P	All
(France) AKKA ASP	Mercedes-AMG GT3	88	(Puerto Rico) Félix Serrallés	P	All
(France) AKKA ASP	Mercedes-AMG GT3	89	(France) Jean-Philippe Belloc	PA	All
(France) AKKA ASP	Mercedes-AMG GT3	89	(France) Christophe Bourret	PA	All
(France) AKKA ASP	Mercedes-AMG GT3	90	(Italy) Raffaele Marciello	P	All
(France) AKKA ASP	Mercedes-AMG GT3	90	(United Kingdom) Michael Meadows	P	All
(Germany) Rowe Racing	BMW M6 GT3	98	(Finland) Markus Palttala	P	All
(Germany) Rowe Racing	BMW M6 GT3	98	(Finland) Jesse Krohn	P	1–3, 5
(Germany) Rowe Racing	BMW M6 GT3	98	(Austria) Philipp Eng	P	4
(Germany) Rowe Racing	BMW M6 GT3	99	(Austria) Philipp Eng	P	1–3
(Germany) Rowe Racing	BMW M6 GT3	99	(United Kingdom) Tom Blomqvist	P	1
(Germany) Rowe Racing	BMW M6 GT3	99	(Portugal) António Félix da Costa	P	2–3, 5
(Germany) Rowe Racing	BMW M6 GT3	99	(Germany) Jens Klingmann	P	5
(Germany) Rinaldi Racing	Ferrari 488 GT3	333	(Germany) Daniel Keilwitz	PA	All
(Germany) Rinaldi Racing	Ferrari 488 GT3	333	(Germany) Alexander Mattschull	PA	All
(Germany) Rinaldi Racing	Ferrari 488 GT3	488	(Italy) Matteo Malucelli	PA	5
(Germany) Rinaldi Racing	Ferrari 488 GT3	488	(Russia) Rinat Salikhov	PA	5

Icon	Class
P	Pro Cup
PA	Pro-Am Cup
S	Silver Cup
Am	Am Cup

== Race results ==
Bold indicates overall winner.

Event	Circuit	Pole position	Qualifying Race Winners	Main Race			
Event	Circuit	Pole position	Qualifying Race Winners	Pro Winners	Pro-Am Winners	Silver Winners	Am Winners
1	(Italy) Misano	(Germany) No. 66 Attempto Racing	(Germany) No. 84 Mercedes-AMG Team HTP Motorsport	**(Germany) No. 84 Mercedes-AMG Team HTP Motorsport**	(Germany) No. 333 Rinaldi Racing	(Germany) No. 85 HTP Motorsport	No entries
1	(Italy) Misano	(Italy) Marco Mapelli (Italy) Giovanni Venturini	(Germany) Maximilian Buhk (France) Franck Perera	**(Germany) Maximilian Buhk** **(France) Franck Perera**	(Germany) Daniel Keilwitz (Germany) Alexander Mattschull	(Germany) Fabian Schiller (Netherlands) Jules Szymkowiak	No entries
2	(United Kingdom) Brands Hatch	(Austria) No. 63 GRT Grasser Racing Team	(Austria) No. 63 GRT Grasser Racing Team	**(Austria) No. 63 GRT Grasser Racing Team**	(Germany) No. 333 Rinaldi Racing	(United Kingdom) No. 42 Strakka Motorsport	No entries
2	(United Kingdom) Brands Hatch	(Italy) Mirko Bortolotti (Germany) Christian Engelhart	(Italy) Mirko Bortolotti (Germany) Christian Engelhart	**(Italy) Mirko Bortolotti** **(Germany) Christian Engelhart**	(Germany) Daniel Keilwitz (Germany) Alexander Mattschull	(Italy) David Fumanelli (United Kingdom) Lewis Williamson	No entries
3	(Belgium) Zolder	(Belgium) No. 17 Team WRT	(Belgium) No. 17 Team WRT	**(Belgium) No. 2 Belgian Audi Club Team WRT**	(Switzerland) No. 11 Kessel Racing	(Germany) No. 85 HTP Motorsport	(Switzerland) No. 888 Kessel Racing
3	(Belgium) Zolder	(Netherlands) Robin Frijns (United Kingdom) Stuart Leonard	(Netherlands) Robin Frijns (United Kingdom) Stuart Leonard	**(United Kingdom) Will Stevens** **(Germany) Markus Winkelhock**	(Poland) Michał Broniszewski (Italy) Giacomo Piccini	(Germany) Fabian Schiller (Netherlands) Jules Szymkowiak	(United States) Stephen Earle (South Africa) David Perel
4	(Hungary) Hungaroring	(Belgium) No. 5 Belgian Audi Club Team WRT	(Belgium) No. 5 Belgian Audi Club Team WRT	**(Belgium) No. 5 Belgian Audi Club Team WRT**	(Germany) No. 333 Rinaldi Racing	(Germany) No. 85 HTP Motorsport	No finishers
4	(Hungary) Hungaroring	(Switzerland) Marcel Fässler (Belgium) Dries Vanthoor	(Switzerland) Marcel Fässler (Belgium) Dries Vanthoor	**(Switzerland) Marcel Fässler** **(Belgium) Dries Vanthoor**	(Germany) Daniel Keilwitz (Germany) Alexander Mattschull	(Germany) Fabian Schiller (Netherlands) Jules Szymkowiak	No finishers
5	(Germany) Nürburgring	(Belgium) No. 5 Belgian Audi Club Team WRT	(Germany) No. 84 Mercedes-AMG Team HTP Motorsport	**(Belgium) No. 17 Team WRT**	(Germany) No. 333 Rinaldi Racing	(Germany) No. 85 HTP Motorsport	(Switzerland) No. 888 Kessel Racing
5	(Germany) Nürburgring	(Switzerland) Marcel Fässler (Belgium) Dries Vanthoor	(Germany) Maximilian Buhk (France) Franck Perera	**(Netherlands) Robin Frijns** **(United Kingdom) Stuart Leonard**	(Germany) Daniel Keilwitz (Germany) Alexander Mattschull	(Germany) Fabian Schiller (Netherlands) Jules Szymkowiak	(United States) Stephen Earle (South Africa) David Perel

== Championship standings ==
Scoring system

Championship points were awarded for the first six positions in each Qualifying Race and for the first ten positions in each Main Race. The pole-sitter in the Qualifying Race also received one point and entries were required to complete 75% of the winning car's race distance in order to be classified and earn points. Individual drivers were required to participate for a minimum of 25 minutes in order to earn championship points in any race.

Qualifying Race points

Position	**1st**	**2nd**	**3rd**	**4th**	**5th**	**6th**	**Pole**
Points	8	6	4	3	2	1	1

Main Race points

Position	**1st**	**2nd**	**3rd**	**4th**	**5th**	**6th**	**7th**	**8th**	**9th**	**10th**
Points	25	18	15	12	10	8	6	4	2	1

=== Drivers' championships ===
==== Overall ====
Pos.	Driver	Team	MIS (Italy)		BRH (United Kingdom)		ZOL (Belgium)		HUN (Hungary)		NÜR (Germany)		Points
Pos.	Driver	Team	QR	MR	QR	MR	QR	MR	QR	MR	QR	MR	Points
1	(United Kingdom) Stuart Leonard	(Belgium) Team WRT	12	24	7	2	**1**	3	5	4	6	1	82
1	(Netherlands) Robin Frijns	(Belgium) Team WRT			7	2	**1**	3	5	4	6	1	82
2	(United Kingdom) Will Stevens (Germany) Markus Winkelhock	(Belgium) Belgian Audi Club Team WRT	Ret	DNS	11	3	3	1	7	5	5	2	74
3	(Germany) Maximilian Buhk (France) Franck Perera	(Germany) Mercedes-AMG Team HTP Motorsport	1	1	23	6	16	6	4	6	1	Ret	68
4	(Italy) Mirko Bortolotti (Germany) Christian Engelhart	(Austria) GRT Grasser Racing Team	8	9	**1**	1	Ret	15	2	3	19	5	67
5	(Switzerland) Marcel Fässler (Belgium) Dries Vanthoor	(Belgium) Belgian Audi Club Team WRT	9	Ret	18	5	13	4	**1**	1	**3**	10	62
6	(Monaco) Vincent Abril (United Kingdom) Steven Kane	(United Kingdom) Bentley Team M-Sport	4	2	20	12	12	5	13	Ret	11	7	37
7	(Finland) Markus Palttala	(Germany) Rowe Racing	11	7	2	4	26	12	12	11	10	4	36
8	(Finland) Jesse Krohn	(Germany) Rowe Racing	11	7	2	4	26	12			10	4	36
9	(United Kingdom) Jake Dennis (Netherlands) Pieter Schothorst	(Belgium) Team WRT	14	10	13	9	24	9	3	2	12	12	27
10	(Argentina) Ezequiel Pérez Companc	(Austria) GRT Grasser Racing Team	Ret	DNS	3	Ret	7	10	21	13	2	3	26
11	(Germany) Fabian Schiller (Netherlands) Jules Szymkowiak	(Germany) HTP Motorsport	2	12	16	17	17	8	14	8	9	6	22
12	(Czech Republic) Filip Salaquarda (Austria) Clemens Schmid	(Czech Republic) ISR	10	15	12	Ret	4	2	17	DNS			21
13	(Italy) Andrea Caldarelli	(Austria) GRT Grasser Racing Team									2	3	21
14	(Austria) Dominik Baumann (Sweden) Jimmy Eriksson	(Germany) HTP Motorsport	20	3	17	22	8	29	11	7	23	17	21
15	(Spain) Daniel Juncadella (Puerto Rico) Félix Serrallés	(France) AKKA ASP	5	4	4	27	5	25	15	Ret	Ret	19	19
16	(Italy) Raffaele Marciello (United Kingdom) Michael Meadows	(France) AKKA ASP	3	16	8	7	2	24	9	12	13	14	16
17	(Germany) Christopher Haase (France) Romain Monti	(France) Saintéloc Racing	7	5	Ret	8	31	14	10	9			16
18	(Austria) Philipp Eng	(Germany) Rowe Racing	16	6	5	Ret	14	Ret	12	11			10
19	(United Kingdom) Tom Blomqvist	(Germany) Rowe Racing	16	6									8
20	(Italy) Marco Mapelli (Italy) Giovanni Venturini	(Germany) Attempto Racing	**23**	27	9	13	9	7					7
21	(United Kingdom) Rob Bell (United Kingdom) Andrew Watson	(United Kingdom) Strakka Racing	18	8	15	21	22	11	24	17	16	9	6
22	(Austria) Norbert Siedler	(Austria) GRT Grasser Racing Team	Ret	DNS	3	Ret	7	10					5
23	(United Kingdom) Jonny Kane	(United Kingdom) Strakka Racing	Ret	DNS	DNS	DNS	Ret	Ret			8	8	4
24	(Netherlands) Steijn Schothorst	(United Kingdom) Strakka Racing									8	8	4
25	(Spain) Andy Soucek (Belgium) Maxime Soulet	(United Kingdom) Bentley Team M-Sport	Ret	DNS	24	18	15	19	6	25	4	15	4
26	(Portugal) António Félix da Costa	(Germany) Rowe Racing			5	Ret	14	Ret			7	11	2
27	(Belgium) Enzo Ide	(Belgium) Belgian Audi Club Team WRT	6	11	Ret	14	6	13	8	18	14	16	2
28	(Germany) Christopher Mies	(Belgium) Belgian Audi Club Team WRT	6	11	Ret	14	6	13	8	18			2
29	(United Kingdom) Ben Barnicoat	(United Kingdom) Strakka Racing	22	18	6	10	10	28	20	24	Ret	25	2
30	(Portugal) Álvaro Parente	(United Kingdom) Strakka Racing	22	18	6	10	10	28	20	24			2
31	(Austria) Klaus Bachler (France) Kévin Estre	(Germany) Attempto Racing							16	10			1
	(Germany) Jens Klingmann	(Germany) Rowe Racing									7	11	0
	(Italy) Kevin Ceccon (Germany) Frank Stippler	(Czech Republic) ISR	21	25	10	Ret	28	30	26	14	Ret	Ret	0
	(United Kingdom) Lewis Williamson	(United Kingdom) Strakka Motorsport	19	13	14	11	11	18	25	Ret	17	13	0
	(Italy) David Fumanelli	(United Kingdom) Strakka Motorsport			14	11	11	18					0
	(United Kingdom) Jamie Green	(Belgium) Team WRT	12	24									0
	(Poland) Michał Broniszewski (Italy) Giacomo Piccini	(Switzerland) Kessel Racing	13	22	27	25	20	16					0
	(Croatia) Martin Kodrić	(United Kingdom) Strakka Motorsport							25	Ret	17	13	0
	(United Kingdom) Nick Leventis	(United Kingdom) Strakka Motorsport	19	13									0
	(Italy) Raffaele Giammaria	(Austria) GRT Grasser Racing Team							21	13			0
	(Germany) Daniel Keilwitz (Germany) Alexander Mattschull	(Germany) Rinaldi Racing	25	14	19	16	19	27	18	15	18	18	0
	(Belgium) Frédéric Vervisch	(Belgium) Belgian Audi Club Team WRT									14	16	0
	(Italy) Fabrizio Crestani	(Italy) Orange 1 Team Lazarus	15	17	21	15			23	23	25	23	0
	(Colombia) Gustavo Yacamán	(Italy) Orange 1 Team Lazarus	15	17	21	15	29	Ret					0
	(France) Tom Dillmann (Switzerland) Rolf Ineichen	(Austria) GRT Grasser Racing Team									15	29	0
	(Thailand) Piti Bhirombhakdi (Netherlands) Carlo van Dam	(Switzerland) Kessel Racing TP12	17	19	26	20	18	20	19	16	26	20	0
	(Italy) Lorenzo Casè (United Kingdom) Phil Quaife	(Switzerland) Spirit of Race	Ret	DNS	25	19	25	17	22	19	DNS	DNS	0
	(Netherlands) Max van Splunteren	(Germany) Attempto Racing	Ret	DNS	Ret	26	21	21	28	20	21	Ret	0
	(France) Jean-Philippe Belloc (France) Christophe Bourret	(France) AKKA ASP	Ret	20	28	24	27	23	29	22	29	26	0
	(France) Simon Gachet (Germany) Peter Terting	(France) Saintéloc Racing									20	22	0
	(Austria) Christopher Zöchling	(Germany) Attempto Racing							28	20			0
	(Germany) Nicolas Pohler	(Germany) Attempto Racing			Ret	26	21	21					0
	(Germany) Nicolas Pohler	(Italy) Orange 1 Team Lazarus							23	23	25	23	0
	(France) Jean-Luc Beaubelique	(France) AKKA ASP	Ret	26	22	23	23	22	27	21	27	24	0
	(France) Jules Gounon	(France) AKKA ASP	Ret	26	22	23	23	22	27	21			0
	(Spain) Albert Costa (Monaco) Stéphane Ortelli	(Switzerland) Emil Frey Lexus Racing									22	21	0
	(Finland) Marko Helistekangas (Australia) Caitlin Wood	(Germany) Reiter Young Stars	26	21	WD	WD							0
	(Spain) Isaac Tutumlu	(Germany) Attempto Racing									21	Ret	0
	(Germany) Kenneth Heyer (Japan) Yoshiharu Mori	(Germany) Kornely Motorsport	24	23	WD	WD							0
	(France) Tristan Vautier	(France) AKKA ASP									27	24	0
	(Italy) Matteo Malucelli (Russia) Rinat Salikhov	(Germany) Rinaldi Racing									24	28	0
	(France) Côme Ledogar	(United Kingdom) Strakka Racing					Ret	Ret			Ret	25	0
	(United States) Stephen Earle (South Africa) David Perel	(Switzerland) Kessel Racing					30	26	30	Ret	28	27	0
	(Italy) Nicola de Marco	(Italy) Orange 1 Team Lazarus					29	Ret					0
	(Netherlands) Loris Hezemans	(United Kingdom) Strakka Racing	Ret	DNS	DNS	DNS							
	(South Africa) Adrian Zaugg	(Germany) Attempto Racing	Ret	DNS									
Pos.	Driver	Team	QR	MR	QR	MR	QR	MR	QR	MR	QR	MR	Points
Pos.	Driver	Team	MIS (Italy)		BRH (United Kingdom)		ZOL (Belgium)		HUN (Hungary)		NÜR (Germany)		Points

Key
Colour	Result
Gold	Race winner
Silver	2nd place
Bronze	3rd place
Green	Points finish
Blue	Non-points finish
Blue	Non-classified finish (NC)
Purple	Did not finish (Ret)
Black	Disqualified (DSQ)
Black	Excluded (EX)
White	Did not start (DNS)
White	Race cancelled (C)
White	Withdrew (WD)
Blank	Did not participate

**Bold** – Pole
Italics – Fastest Lap

==== Pro-Am Cup ====
Pos.	Driver	Team	MIS (Italy)		BRH (United Kingdom)		ZOL (Belgium)		HUN (Hungary)		NÜR (Germany)		Points
Pos.	Driver	Team	QR	MR	QR	MR	QR	MR	QR	MR	QR	MR	Points
1	(Germany) Daniel Keilwitz (Germany) Alexander Mattschull	(Germany) Rinaldi Racing	25	14	19	16	19	27	18	15	**18**	18	144
2	(Thailand) Piti Bhirombhakdi (Netherlands) Carlo van Dam	(Switzerland) Kessel Racing TP12	17	19	26	20	**18**	20	19	16	26	20	119
3	(France) Jean-Luc Beaubelique	(France) AKKA ASP	**Ret**	26	**22**	23	23	22	**27**	21	27	24	87
4	(France) Jean-Philippe Belloc (France) Christophe Bourret	(France) AKKA ASP	Ret	20	28	24	27	23	29	22	29	26	72
5	(France) Jules Gounon	(France) AKKA ASP	**Ret**	26	**22**	23	23	22	**27**	21			69
6	(Poland) Michał Broniszewski (Italy) Giacomo Piccini	(Switzerland) Kessel Racing	13	22	27	25	20	16					62
7	(France) Tristan Vautier	(France) AKKA ASP									27	24	18
8	(Italy) Matteo Malucelli (Russia) Rinat Salikhov	(Germany) Rinaldi Racing									24	28	16
9	(Germany) Kenneth Heyer (Japan) Yoshiharu Mori	(Germany) Kornely Motorsport	24	23	WD	WD							14
Pos.	Driver	Team	QR	MR	QR	MR	QR	MR	QR	MR	QR	MR	Points
Pos.	Driver	Team	MIS (Italy)		BRH (United Kingdom)		ZOL (Belgium)		HUN (Hungary)		NÜR (Germany)		Points

==== Silver Cup ====
Pos.	Driver	Team	MIS (Italy)		BRH (United Kingdom)		ZOL (Belgium)		HUN (Hungary)		NÜR (Germany)		Points
Pos.	Driver	Team	QR	MR	QR	MR	QR	MR	QR	MR	QR	MR	Points
1	(Germany) Fabian Schiller (Netherlands) Jules Szymkowiak	(Germany) HTP Motorsport	2	12	16	17	17	8	14	8	9	6	154
2	(United Kingdom) Lewis Williamson	(United Kingdom) Strakka Motorsport	**19**	13	**14**	11	**11**	18	25	Ret	17	13	110
3	(Italy) Lorenzo Casè (United Kingdom) Phil Quaife	(Switzerland) Spirit of Race	Ret	DNS	25	19	25	17	**22**	19	DNS	DNS	65
4	(Germany) Nicolas Pohler	(Germany) Attempto Racing			Ret	26	21	21					62
4	(Germany) Nicolas Pohler	(Italy) Orange 1 Team Lazarus							23	23	25	23	62
5	(Italy) David Fumanelli	(United Kingdom) Strakka Motorsport			**14**	11	**11**	18					58
6	(Netherlands) Max van Splunteren	(Germany) Attempto Racing	Ret	DNS	Ret	26	21	21	28	20	**21**	Ret	50
7	(Italy) Fabrizio Crestani	(Italy) Orange 1 Team Lazarus							23	23	25	23	34
8	(Croatia) Martin Kodrić	(United Kingdom) Strakka Motorsport							25	Ret	17	13	27
9	(United Kingdom) Nick Leventis	(United Kingdom) Strakka Motorsport	**19**	13									25
10	(Finland) Marko Helistekangas (Australia) Caitlin Wood	(Germany) Reiter Young Stars	26	21	WD	WD							19
11	(Austria) Christopher Zöchling	(Germany) Attempto Racing							28	20			17
12	(Spain) Isaac Tutumlu	(Germany) Attempto Racing									**21**	Ret	5
	(South Africa) Adrian Zaugg	(Germany) Attempto Racing	Ret	DNS									
Pos.	Driver	Team	QR	MR	QR	MR	QR	MR	QR	MR	QR	MR	Points
Pos.	Driver	Team	MIS (Italy)		BRH (United Kingdom)		ZOL (Belgium)		HUN (Hungary)		NÜR (Germany)		Points

==== Am Cup ====
Pos.	Driver	Team	MIS (Italy)		BRH (United Kingdom)		ZOL (Belgium)		HUN (Hungary)		NÜR (Germany)		Points
Pos.	Driver	Team	QR	MR	QR	MR	QR	MR	QR	MR	QR	MR	Points
1	(United States) Stephen Earle (South Africa) David Perel	(Switzerland) Kessel Racing					**30**	26	**30**	Ret	**28**	27	77
Pos.	Driver	Team	QR	MR	QR	MR	QR	MR	QR	MR	QR	MR	Points
Pos.	Driver	Team	MIS (Italy)		BRH (United Kingdom)		ZOL (Belgium)		HUN (Hungary)		NÜR (Germany)		Points

=== Teams' championships ===
==== Overall ====
Pos.	Team	Manufacturer	MIS (Italy)		BRH (United Kingdom)		ZOL (Belgium)		HUN (Hungary)		NÜR (Germany)		Points
Pos.	Team	Manufacturer	QR	MR	QR	MR	QR	MR	QR	MR	QR	MR	Points
1	(Belgium) Belgian Audi Club Team WRT	Audi	6	11	11	3	3	1	**1**	1	**3**	2	106
2	(Belgium) Team WRT	Audi	12	10	7	2	**1**	3	3	2	6	1	97
3	(Austria) GRT Grasser Racing Team	Lamborghini	8	9	**1**	1	7	10	2	3	2	3	91
4	(Germany) (Mercedes-AMG Team) HTP Motorsport	Mercedes-Benz	1	1	16	6	8	6	4	6	1	6	87
5	(Germany) Rowe Racing	BMW	11	6	2	4	14	12	12	11	7	4	49
6	(United Kingdom) Bentley Team M-Sport	Bentley	4	2	20	12	12	5	6	25	4	7	48
7	(France) AKKA ASP	Mercedes-Benz	3	4	4	7	2	22	9	12	13	14	46
8	(France) Saintéloc Racing	Audi	7	5	Ret	8	31	14	10	9	20	22	31
9	(United Kingdom) Strakka Racing	McLaren	18	8	6	10	10	11	20	17	8	8	25
10	(Czech Republic) ISR	Audi	10	15	10	Ret	4	2	17	14	Ret	Ret	23
11	(Germany) Attempto Racing	Lamborghini; Porsche	**23**	27	9	13	9	7	16	10	21	Ret	18
12	(United Kingdom) Strakka Motorsport	McLaren	19	13	14	11	11	18	25	Ret	17	13	7
13	(Germany) Rinaldi Racing	Ferrari	25	14	19	16	19	27	18	15	18	18	2
	(Switzerland) Kessel Racing (TP12)	Ferrari	13	19	26	20	18	16	19	16	26	20	0
	(Italy) Orange 1 Team Lazarus	Lamborghini	15	17	21	15	29	Ret	23	23	25	23	0
	(Italy) AF Corse	Ferrari	Ret	DNS	25	19	25	17	22	19	DNS	DNS	0
	(Switzerland) Emil Frey Lexus Racing	Lexus									22	21	0
	(Germany) Reiter Young Stars	Lamborghini	26	21	WD	WD							0
	(Germany) Kornely Motorsport	Mercedes-Benz	24	23	WD	WD							0
Pos.	Team	Manufacturer	QR	MR	QR	MR	QR	MR	QR	MR	QR	MR	Points
Pos.	Team	Manufacturer	MIS (Italy)		BRH (United Kingdom)		ZOL (Belgium)		HUN (Hungary)		NÜR (Germany)		Points

==== Pro-Am Cup ====
Pos.	Team	Manufacturer	MIS (Italy)		BRH (United Kingdom)		ZOL (Belgium)		HUN (Hungary)		NÜR (Germany)		Points
Pos.	Team	Manufacturer	QR	MR	QR	MR	QR	MR	QR	MR	QR	MR	Points
1	(Germany) Rinaldi Racing	Ferrari	25	14	19	16	19	27	18	15	**18**	18	150
2	(Switzerland) Kessel Racing (TP12)	Ferrari	13	19	26	20	**18**	16	19	16	26	20	130
3	(France) AKKA ASP	Mercedes-Benz	**Ret**	20	**22**	23	23	22	**27**	21	27	24	99
4	(Germany) Kornely Motorsport	Mercedes-Benz	24	23	WD	WD							18
Pos.	Team	Manufacturer	QR	MR	QR	MR	QR	MR	QR	MR	QR	MR	Points
Pos.	Team	Manufacturer	MIS (Italy)		BRH (United Kingdom)		ZOL (Belgium)		HUN (Hungary)		NÜR (Germany)		Points

==== Silver Cup ====
Pos.	Driver	Team	MIS (Italy)		BRH (United Kingdom)		ZOL (Belgium)		HUN (Hungary)		NÜR (Germany)		Points
Pos.	Driver	Team	QR	MR	QR	MR	QR	MR	QR	MR	QR	MR	Points
1	(Germany) HTP Motorsport	Mercedes-Benz	2	12	16	17	17	8	14	8	9	6	154
2	(United Kingdom) Strakka Motorsport	McLaren	**19**	13	**14**	11	**11**	18	25	Ret	17	13	110
3	(Italy) AF Corse	Ferrari	Ret	DNS	25	19	25	17	**22**	19	DNS	DNS	65
4	(Germany) Attempto Racing	Lamborghini	Ret	DNS	Ret	26	21	21	28	20	**21**	Ret	50
5	(Italy) Orange 1 Team Lazarus	Lamborghini							23	23	25	23	34
6	(Germany) Reiter Young Stars	Lamborghini	26	21	WD	WD							19
Pos.	Driver	Team	QR	MR	QR	MR	QR	MR	QR	MR	QR	MR	Points
Pos.	Driver	Team	MIS (Italy)		BRH (United Kingdom)		ZOL (Belgium)		HUN (Hungary)		NÜR (Germany)		Points

==== Am Cup ====
Pos.	Team	Manufacturer	MIS (Italy)		BRH (United Kingdom)		ZOL (Belgium)		HUN (Hungary)		NÜR (Germany)		Points
Pos.	Team	Manufacturer	QR	MR	QR	MR	QR	MR	QR	MR	QR	MR	Points
1	(Switzerland) Kessel Racing	Ferrari					**30**	26	**30**	Ret	**28**	27	77
Pos.	Team	Manufacturer	QR	MR	QR	MR	QR	MR	QR	MR	QR	MR	Points
Pos.	Team	Manufacturer	MIS (Italy)		BRH (United Kingdom)		ZOL (Belgium)		HUN (Hungary)		NÜR (Germany)		Points

== See also ==
- 2017 Blancpain GT Series
- 2017 Blancpain GT Series Endurance Cup
- 2017 Blancpain GT Series Asia
