= Hiroshi Hamaguchi =

Japanese businessman and racing driver (born 1976)

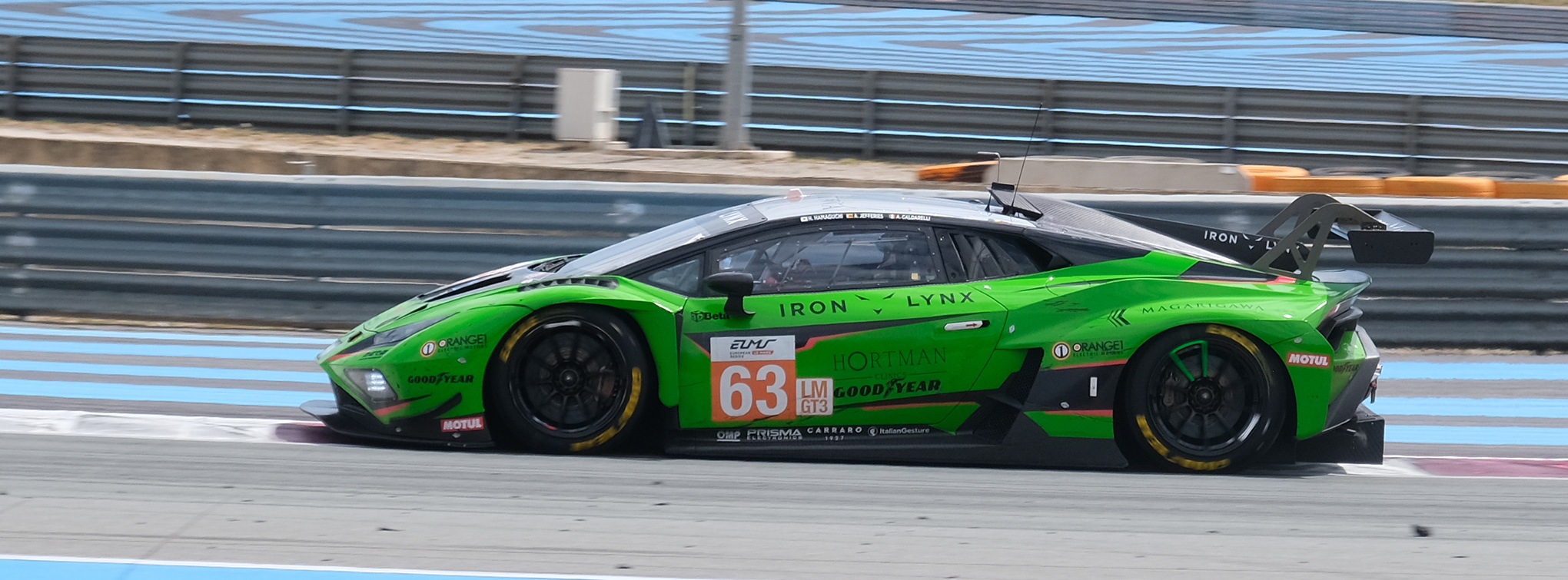
- Nationality: (Japan) Japanese
- Born: October 1, 1976 (age 50) Tokyo, Japan
- Categorisation: FIA Bronze
Medal record
GT3
Representing Japan
FIA Motorsport Games
Gold medal – first place	2019 Rome	GT Cup

Hiroshi Hamaguchi (濱口 弘, Hamaguchi Hiroshi; born October 1, 1976) is a Japanese businessman and racing driver. He won the 2019 FIA Motorsport Games GT Cup along with Ukyo Sasahara, driving a Lamborghini Huracán EVO GT3.

== Racing record ==
=== Complete GT World Challenge results ===
==== GT World Challenge Europe Endurance Cup ====
(Races in bold indicate pole position) (Races in italics indicate fastest lap)

Year	Team	Car	Class	1	2	3	4	5	6	7	Pos.	Points
2020	Orange1 FFF Racing Team	Lamborghini Huracán GT3 Evo	Pro-Am	IMO; 33	NÜR; 18	SPA; 6H; 55	SPA; 12H; 55	SPA; 24H; Ret	LEC; 27		5th	52
2021	Orange 1 FFF Racing Team	Lamborghini Huracán GT3 Evo	Pro-Am	MNZ; 16	LEC; 22	SPA; 6H; 35	SPA; 12H; Ret	SPA; 24H; Ret	NÜR; 19	CAT; 35	3rd	74
2026	Tsunami RT	Porsche 911 GT3 R (992.2)	Pro-Am	LEC	MNZ	SPA; 6H; 53	SPA; 12H; 47	SPA; 24H; 38	NÜR	ALG	NC	0

==== GT World Challenge Europe Sprint Cup ====
(Races in bold indicate pole position) (Races in italics indicate fastest lap)

Year	Team	Car	Class	1	2	3	4	5	6	7	8	9	10	Pos.	Points
2019	Orange1 FFF Racing Team	Lamborghini Huracán GT3	Pro-Am	BRH; 1; 14	BRH; 2; 14	MIS; 1; 15	MIS; 2; 17	ZAN; 1; 18	ZAN; 2; 20	NÜR; 1; 21	NÜR; 2; 20	HUN; 1; 22	HUN; 2; 21	1st	131

=== Complete 24 Hours of Le Mans results ===
Year	Team	Co-Drivers	Car	Class	Laps	Pos.	Class Pos.
2024	(United Kingdom) United Autosports	(Chile) Nico Pino (Japan) Marino Sato	McLaren 720S GT3 Evo	LMGT3	212	DNF	DNF

Sporting positions
Preceded by Alessio Picariello; Zacharie Robichon; Ryan Hardwick (LMGTE)	European Le Mans Series; LMGT3 Champion; 2024; With: Andrea Caldarelli & Axcil Jefferies	Succeeded by Incumbent
