= 2019 FIA Motorsport Games GT Cup =

Motorsport event

Race details
Date	1–3 November
Official name	FIA Motorsport Games
Location	Vallelunga Circuit, Campagnano di Roma, Italy
Course	Permanent circuit 4.085 km (2.538 mi)
Distance	Qualifying Race 1; 60 minutes Qualifying Race 2; 60 minutes Main Race; 60 minutes
- Qualifying Race 1

Pole
Driver	(Japan) Ukyo Sasahara	Team Japan
Time	1:32.898

Fastest lap
Driver	(Japan) Ukyo Sasahara	Team Japan
Time	1:33.384

Podium
First	(Germany) Alfred Renauer	Team Germany
Second	(Denmark) Christina Nielsen	Team Denmark
Third	(Poland) Artur Janosz	Team Poland
- Qualifying Race 2

Pole
Driver	(Japan) Hiroshi Hamaguchi	Team Japan
Time	1:38.443

Fastest lap
Driver	(Poland) Andrzej Lewandowski	Team Poland
Time	1:49.426

Podium
First	(Japan) Hiroshi Hamaguchi	Team Japan
Second	(Portugal) Miguel Ramos	Team Portugal
Third	(Chinese Taipei) Hanss Po Heng Lin	Team Chinese Taipei
- Main Race

Pole
Driver	(Poland) Andrzej Lewandowski	Team Poland

Fastest lap
Driver	(Kuwait) Zaid Ashkanani	Team Kuwait
Time	1:39.086

Medalists
1st place, gold medalist(s)	(Japan) Hiroshi Hamaguchi (Japan) Ukyo Sasahara	Team Japan
2nd place, silver medalist(s)	(Poland) Artur Janosz (Poland) Andrzej Lewandowski	Team Poland
3rd place, bronze medalist(s)	(Australia) Brenton Grove (Australia) Stephen Grove	Team Australia

The 2019 FIA Motorsport Games GT Cup was the first edition of the pro–am FIA Motorsport Games GT Cup and a continuation of the FIA GT Nations Cup. The event was a Grand Touring (GT) sports car race contested with GT3-spec cars and was held at the Vallelunga Circuit, Italy between 1 and 3 November 2019. Only Silver and Bronze drivers were allowed to compete. The event was part of the 2019 FIA Motorsport Games and was promoted by the SRO Motorsports Group (SRO) in partnership with the Fédération Internationale de l'Automobile (FIA; global motor racing's governing body).

The pair of drivers who represented Japan, Hiroshi Hamaguchi and Ukyo Sasahara, won the main race and the gold medal sharing a Lamborghini Huracán GT3 Evo from third position. Poland's team of Artur Janosz and Andrzej Lewandowski began from pole position after scoring the fewest number of points in the two preceding qualification races. Lewandowski led until he was overtaken by Hamaguchi on lap four and maintained it to the end. Janosz and Lewandowski claimed the silver medal and the father and son duo of Brenton Grove and Stephen Grove took the bronze medal for Australia.

== Background and entry list ==
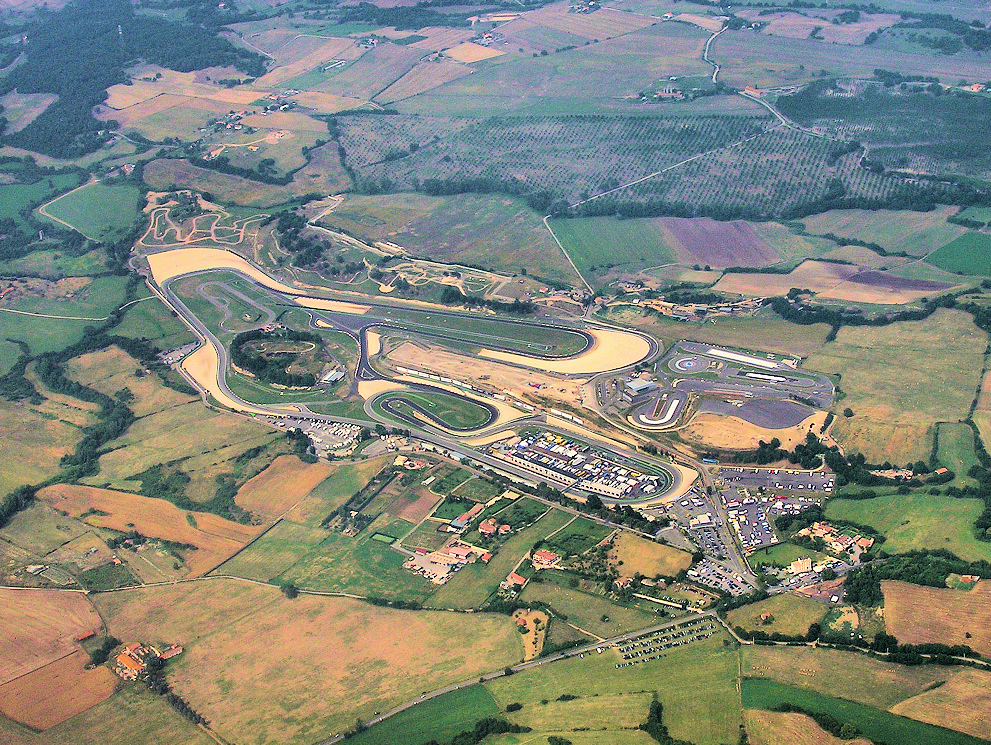
The Vallelunga Circuit, where the event was held

The 2019 FIA Motorsport Games GT Cup was one of six events to be held as part of the 2019 FIA Motorsport Games, an international motor racing competition modelled on the Olympic Games. It was promoted and organised by the SRO Motorsports Group (SRO) in partnership with the Fédération Internationale de l'Automobile (FIA; global motor racing's governing body) and took place at the Vallelunga Circuit near Rome, Italy from 1 to 3 November 2019. The SRO had proposed holding the event as the second running of the FIA GT Nations Cup at Vallelunga to the FIA in December 2018.

The format used in the 2018 FIA GT Nations Cup was carried over to the FIA Motorsport Games. Drivers had to hold an International ‘C’ licence as a minimum and had to have competed in an FIA-regulated championship race based on GT3 regulations in the previous two seasons or have significant experience in Grand Touring (GT) cars to enter the race pending the discretion of the FIA Motor Sport Games Committee. Each nation could be represented by a two-driver Pro–am crew made up of either an FIA silver and bronze-ranked racers or both drivers categorised as bronze, but no uncategorised, Platinum or Gold-rated competitors could enter. Teams entering the car could come from any country but their drivers had to come from their entry's country. All National Sporting Authorites (ASN) had responsibility for the identification and selection of their competitors for the event, based on a set of criteria including results in domestic series, international racing experience and each team's operating resources.

The final entry list composed of 22 car teams of two drivers each was published on 9 October 2019. Teams fielded GT3 cars from Aston Martin, Audi, Ferrari, Honda, Lamborghini, Mercedes-AMG and Porsche and entrants came from multiple countries in four continents: Asia, Europe, North America and Oceania. AF Corse were the most represented team with four cars. The top three finishers of the main race received medals following the race's conclusion and these results produced an medal table that would see the best performing ASN as determined by the number of gold medals won and then by silver and bronze medals being presented with the FIA Motorsport Games trophy at a closing ceremony in Rome.

== Practice and qualifying ==
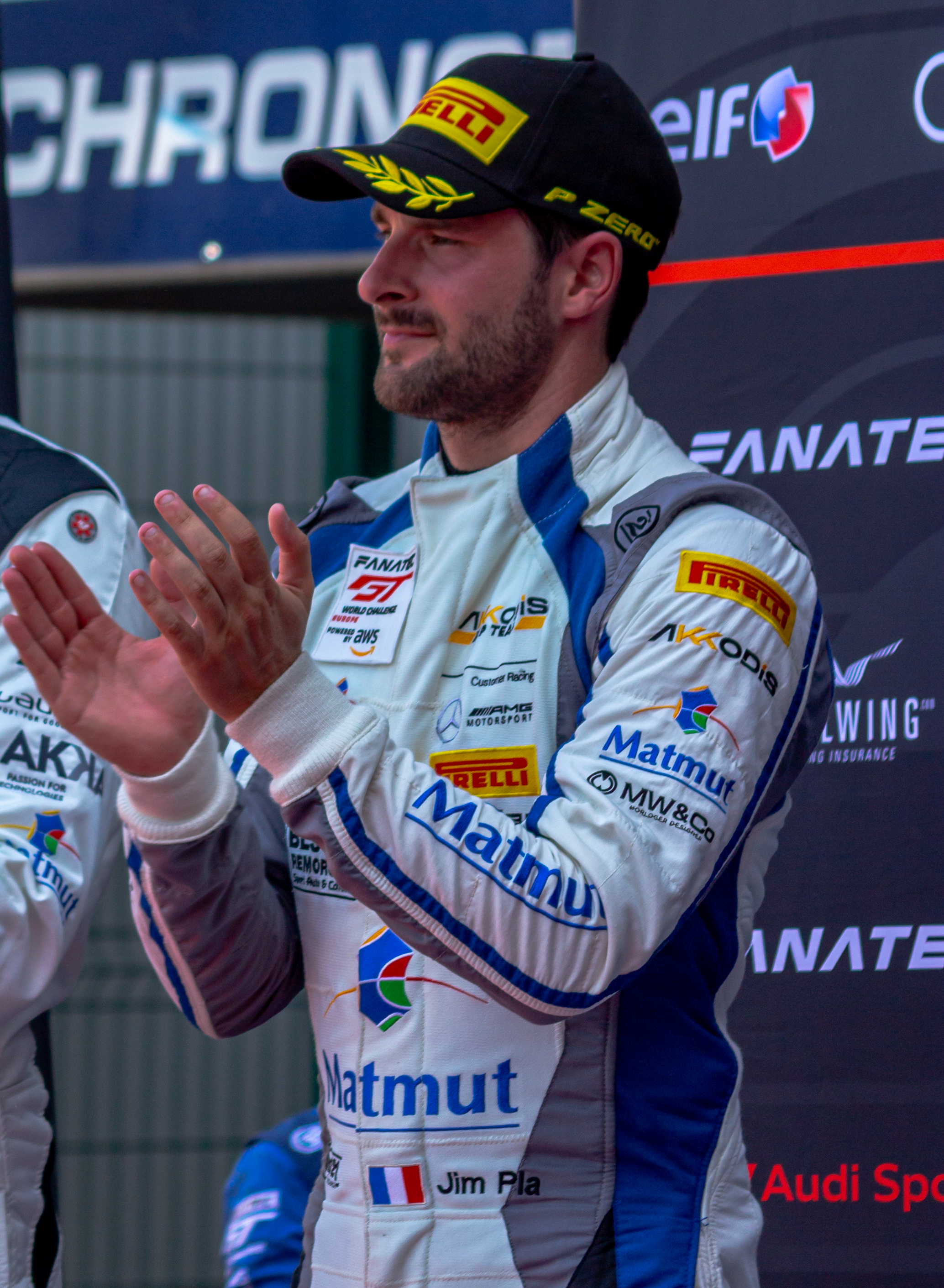
Jim Pla (pictured in 2022) took second for France after setting an identical lap time to Japan's Ukyo Sasahara in the second qualifying session.

Two 80-minute practice sessions were held in the morning and afternoon of 1 November. Overnight rain made the circuit wet, making track conditions tricky for the first practice session. France led the session with a lap time of 1:32.693 set late on by driver Jim Pla in a Mercedes-AMG GT3. Pla was two-tenths of a second quicker than the second-placed Patric Niederhauser driving a Lamborghini Huracán GT3 Evo for Switzerland. Alfred Renauer's German Porsche 911 GT3 R, Russia's Denis Bulatov in a Ferrari 488 GT3 and Weiron Tan's Malaysia Porsche were in third through fifth. Just 21 out of the 22 entries set a lap time as Portugal's Audi R8 LMS GT3 Evo was in the pit lane due to an issue with the car's front. Tan stopped at the pit lane entry midway through the session, stopping practice. In the second practice session, which took place on a dry track, Niederhauser lapped fastest for Switzerland with a time of 1:32.304. Pla dropped from first to second while Kantadhee Kusiri was third for Thailand. Renault was fourth for Germany and Russia's Bulatov took fifth. The session was twice stopped, with the second halt ending practice early.

Two 20-minute qualifying sessions were held on the morning on 2 November. All Bronze-rated drivers set lap times in the first session to set the starting order for the first qualifying race. Each squad's Silver-rated driver recorded lap times in the second session to determine the starting grid for the second qualifying race. The first qualifying session was held on a wet circuit that dried as the session progressed and saw Hiroshi Hamaguchi of Japan claim pole position with a 1:38.443 lap after leading the time sheets early on. Salih Yoluç qualified Turkey second, 1.397 seconds behind. Rinat Salikhov took third for Russia, ahead of Portugal's Miguel Ramos, Germany's Steffen Görig and the United States's Robert Ferriol. The final grid positions were as follows: Denmark, Italy, Poland, Australia, Thailand, Spain, Malaysia, China, Hong Kong, Chinese Taipei, Switzerland, the United Kingdom, France, Belarus, Belgium and Kuwait. France's Jean-Luc Beaubelique was given a reprimand for an unsafe return onto the circuit. The second session was led by Japan's Ukyo Sasahara with a lap of 1:32.898 he set on a drying circuit, the same lap time as France's Pla but Sasahara was awarded pole position because he set the time first, completing a sweep of qualifying sessions for Japan. Switzerland's Niederhauser and Australia's Brenton Grove were third and fourth. Bulatov of Russia and Tan for Malaysia completed the top six. The final grid positions were taken by Portugal, Germany, Chinese Taipei, Poland, the United States, Thailand, Belarus, Belgium, Denmark, Turkey, the United Kingdom, Kuwait, Italy, Hong Kong, Spain and China.

=== First qualifying session classification ===
Final classification of the first qualifying session
Pos	No.	Licence	Driver	Team	Entrant	Car	Time	Gap	Grid
1	519	B	Hiroshi Hamaguchi	Team Japan	Orange1 FFF Racing Team	Lamborghini Huracán GT3 Evo	1:38.443	—	1
2	1	B	Salih Yoluç	Team Turkey	TF Sport	Aston Martin Vantage AMR GT3	1:39.840	+1.397	2
3	888	B	Rinat Salikhov	Team Russia	Team Russia	Ferrari 488 GT3	1:40.179	+1.736	3
4	99	B	Miguel Ramos	Team Portugal	Attempto Racing	Audi R8 LMS GT3 Evo (2019)	1:41.767	+3.324	4
5	991	B	Steffen Görig	Team Germany	Herberth Motorsport	Porsche 911 GT3 R	1:43.326	+4.883	5
6	18	B	Robert Ferriol	(United States) Team USA	Spirit of Race	Ferrari 488 GT3	1:43.698	+5.255	6
7	11	B	Jens Reno Møller	Team Denmark	Reno Racing	Honda NSX GT3	1:44.099	+5.656	7
8	21	B	Gianluca Roda	Team Italy	AF Corse	Ferrari 488 GT3	1:44.248	+5.805	8
9	66	B	Andrzej Lewandowski	Team Poland	Vincenzo Sospiri Racing	Lamborghini Huracán GT3 Evo	1:44.258	+5.815	9
10	4	B	Stephen Grove	Team Australia	Herberth Motorsport	Porsche 911 GT3 R	1:44.333	+5.890	10
11	911	B	Vutthikorn Inthraphuvasak	Team Thailand	Dinamic Motorsport	Porsche 911 GT3 R	1:44.570	+6.127	11
12	19	B	Alvaro Lobera	Team Spain	Racing Team Spain	Lamborghini Huracán GT3 Evo	1:44.781	+6.338	12
13	16	B	Adrian Henry D'Silva	Team Malaysia	Earl Bamber Motorsport	Porsche 911 GT3 R	1:45.317	+6.874	13
14	70	B	Yaqi Zhang	Team China	Phantom Pro Racing Team	Mercedes-AMG GT3	1:45.492	+7.049	14
15	22	B	Paul Ip	Team Hong Kong	Reno Racing	Honda NSX GT3	1:45.533	+7.090	15
16	68	B	Hanss Po Heng Lin	Team Chinese Taipei	Gama Racing	Lamborghini Huracán GT3 Evo	1:45.832	+7.389	16
17	58	B	Christoph Lenz	Team Switzerland	Raton Racing	Lamborghini Huracán GT3 Evo	1:46.059	+7.616	17
18	93	B	Flick Haigh	(United Kingdom) Team UK	Tempesta Racing	Ferrari 488 GT3	1:46.237	+7.794	18
19	87	B	Jean-Luc Beaubelique	Team France	AKKA-ASP	Mercedes-AMG GT3	1:46.348	+7.905	19
20	51	B	Alexander Talkanitsa Sr.	Team Belarus	AT Racing Team	Ferrari 488 GT3	1:46.355	+7.912	20
21	88	B	Louis Machiels	Team Belgium	Attempto Racing	Audi R8 LMS GT3 Evo (2019)	1:47.558	+9.115	21
22	007	B	Khaled Al-Mudhaf	Team Kuwait	Optimum Motorsport	Aston Martin Vantage AMR GT3	1:54.380	+15.937	22

Categorisation
Icon	Class
S	Silver
B	Bronze

=== Second qualifying session classification ===
Final classification of the second qualifying session
Pos	No.	Licence	Driver	Team	Entrant	Car	Time	Gap	Grid
1	519	S	Ukyo Sasahara	Team Japan	Orange1 FFF Racing Team	Lamborghini Huracán GT3 Evo	1:32.898	—	1
2	87	S	Jim Pla	Team France	AKKA-ASP	Mercedes-AMG GT3	1:32.898	—	2
3	58	S	Patric Niederhauser	Team Switzerland	Raton Racing	Lamborghini Huracán GT3 Evo	1:33.227	+0.329	3
4	4	S	Brenton Grove	Team Australia	Herberth Motorsport	Porsche 911 GT3 R	1:33.359	+0.461	4
5	888	S	Denis Bulatov	Team Russia	Team Russia	Ferrari 488 GT3	1:33.482	+0.584	5
6	16	S	Weiron Tan	Team Malaysia	Earl Bamber Motorsport	Porsche 911 GT3 R	1:33.485	+0.587	6
7	99	S	Henrique Chaves	Team Portugal	Attempto Racing	Audi R8 LMS GT3 Evo (2019)	1:33.712	+0.814	7
8	991	S	Alfred Renauer	Team Germany	Herberth Motorsport	Porsche 911 GT3 R	1:33.785	+0.887	8
9	68	S	Evan Chen	Team Chinese Taipei	Gama Racing	Lamborghini Huracán GT3 Evo	1:33.963	+1.065	9
10	66	S	Artur Janosz	Team Poland	Vincenzo Sospiri Racing	Lamborghini Huracán GT3 Evo	1:33.970	+1.072	10
11	18	B	Spencer Pumpelly	(United States) Team USA	Spirit of Race	Ferrari 488 GT3	1:34.167	+1.269	11
12	911	S	Kantadhee Kusiri	Team Thailand	Dinamic Motorsport	Porsche 911 GT3 R	1:34.235	+1.337	12
13	51	S	Alexander Talkanitsa Jr.	Team Belarus	AT Racing Team	Ferrari 488 GT3	1:34.240	+1.342	13
14	88	S	Nico Verdonck	Team Belgium	Attempto Racing	Audi R8 LMS GT3 Evo (2019)	1:34.243	+1.345	14
15	11	S	Christina Nielsen	Team Denmark	Reno Racing	Honda NSX GT3	1:34.310	+1.412	15
16	1	S	Ayhancan Güven	Team Turkey	TF Sport	Aston Martin Vantage AMR GT3	1:34.394	+1.496	16
17	93	S	Chris Froggatt	(United Kingdom) Team UK	Tempesta Racing	Ferrari 488 GT3	1:34.582	+1.684	17
18	007	S	Zaid Ashkanani	Team Kuwait	Optimum Motorsport	Aston Martin Vantage AMR GT3	1:34.676	+1.778	18
19	21	S	Giorgio Roda	Team Italy	AF Corse	Ferrari 488 GT3	1:34.830	+1.932	19
20	22	S	Marchy Lee	Team Hong Kong	Reno Racing	Honda NSX GT3	1:35.034	+2.136	20
21	19	S	Fernando Navarrete Jr.	Team Spain	Racing Team Spain	Lamborghini Huracán GT3 Evo	1:35.131	+2.233	21
22	70	S	Kan Zang	Team China	Phantom Pro Racing Team	Mercedes-AMG GT3	1:35.817	+2.919	22

== Qualifying races ==
There were two one-hour qualifying races to set the starting order for the main race through a points-scoring system. Each entry, including all retirements, tallied points based on its finishing position. The winner of each qualifying race earned one point and the second-place finisher received two points. The points total from both qualifying races were combined to set the starting order for the main race, with pole position being awarded to the entry with the fewest points scored. Should two cars have earned the same number of points, then the car that set the fastest race lap from either qualifying race would be ahead of the other. Cars that did not start one or two qualifying races were required to start at the rear of the grid.

=== First qualification race ===
The first qualifying race commenced on a wet track surface at 14:25 local time on 2 November. Japan's Hamaguchi maintained his pole position advantage and established an early lead over the rest of the field, followed by Turkey's Yoluç, Ramos of Portugal and Salikhov for Russia. Salikhov moved from fourth to second with overtakes on Ramos and Yoluç. On the first lap, the safety car was deployed for the first time after Kuwait's Khaled Al Mudhaf in an Aston Martin crashed heavily into the barrier, causing the entry's retirement. Al Mudhaf was unhurt. The safety car was on track for 11 minutes before racing resumed. Hamaguchi continued to lead the race until rain began to fall and he was passed by Salikhov for the race lead after 20 minutes before losing second to Yoluç after running straight on.

Several drivers were caught out by the change in conditions. Paul Ip, in his GT3 debut, ran wide in the Hong Kong Honda as well as Görig in Germany's Porsche. Ramos was attempting to pass Yoluç when he ran wide onto the infield at the exit to turn three and spun through 180 degrees onto the sodden grass. He skimmed across the circuit and crashed into the outside barrier, removing the Audi's rear wing and sustained further damage that necessitated the car's retirement in the pit lane. Gianluca Roda passed Ferriol on the inside as Ferriol spun and Stephen Grove's Australian entry and China's Yaqi Zhang spun. Beaubelique's spin into the gravel trap and Spain's Fernando Navarrete Jr. becoming beached upon a kerb prompted race control to deploy the safety car for the second time. Because there were so many cars that had spun, race control made the decision to red flag the race to a halt after half distance. The stoppage allowed teams to switch drivers and tyres; multiple squads decided to switch to rain tyres while others changed to slick tyres.

When the race was resumed with the Silver-rated drivers installed in the cars, there were eight minutes remaining but race control added an additional 21 minutes. At this point, the circuit began to dry, negatively impacting those teams that had decided not to change tyres. Bulatov led the field from Güven and Sasahara, who sustained a puncture on the first racing lap. Sasahara entered the pit lane and dropped down the race order. A group soon broke away, comprising Russia, Turkey, Thailand, Denmark, Germany, and Belgium. The change in conditions meant cars on slick tyres had a pace advantage and Denmark's Christina Nielsen, who had a cold, and Renauer overtook Güven before passing Bulatov. Nielsen was able to use the Honda's pace advantage to hold off Renauer until Renauer overtook her on the inside for the lead with ten minutes remaining. Nico Verdonck of Belgium battled Nielsen in the closing minutes but was unable to pass her after he was unable to stop his car in time and ran wide. At the front, Renauer maintained the lead for the remainder of the race and won the first qualification race for Germany. The Denmark team finished second, 8.756 seconds behind, and Belgium were provisionally third. The Poland team of Andrej Lewandowski and Artur Janosz were fourth, ahead of the United Kingdom's Flick Haigh and Chris Froggatt in fifth and Belarus's father and son pairing of Alexander Talkanitsa Sr. and Alexander Talkanitsa Jr. in sixth.

After the race, the Hong Kong team were disqualified because of a turbocharger boost pressure infringement that did not match that of the GT3 balance of performance. Belgium received a 30-second time penalty in lieu of a drive-through penalty for the first lap contact between Louis Machiels and the Kuwait entry that sent Kuwait's entry into retirement. This demoted Belgium from third to eighth. Turkey were imposed a 30-second time penalty for a driving standards infringement committed by Yoluç, dropping Turkey from 12th to 13th. Thailand received a three-place grid penalty for the second qualifying race for a clash that sent Australia off the circuit while Nielsen had to start from the back of the grid for not slowing down fast enough for a stoppage during free practice. This meant the list of classified finishers after penalties were applied was Germany, Denmark, Poland, the United Kingdom, Belarus, China, Italy, Belgium, Australia, Japan, Russia, Thailand, Turkey, France, the United States, Spain, Switzerland and Chinese Taipei.

==== Qualifying Race 1 classification ====
Final classification of the first qualifying race
Pos	No.	Licence	Driver	Team	Entrant	Car	Laps	Time/Retired	Grid	Points
1	991	B	Steffen Görig	Team Germany	Herberth Motorsport	Porsche 911 GT3 R	29	1:21:21.471	5	1
1	991	S	Alfred Renauer	Team Germany	Herberth Motorsport	Porsche 911 GT3 R	29	1:21:21.471	5	1
2	11	B	Jens Reno Møller	Team Denmark	Reno Racing	Honda NSX GT3	29	+8.756	7	2
2	11	S	Christina Nielsen	Team Denmark	Reno Racing	Honda NSX GT3	29	+8.756	7	2
3	66	B	Andrzej Lewandowski	Team Poland	Vincenzo Sospiri Racing	Lamborghini Huracán GT3 Evo	29	+13.293	9	3
3	66	S	Artur Janosz	Team Poland	Vincenzo Sospiri Racing	Lamborghini Huracán GT3 Evo	29	+13.293	9	3
4	93	B	Flick Haigh	(United Kingdom) Team UK	Tempesta Racing	Ferrari 488 GT3	29	+20.370	18	4
4	93	S	Chris Froggatt	(United Kingdom) Team UK	Tempesta Racing	Ferrari 488 GT3	29	+20.370	18	4
5	51	B	Alexander Talkanitsa Sr.	Team Belarus	AT Racing Team	Ferrari 488 GT3	29	+31.951	20	5
5	51	S	Alexander Talkanitsa Jr.	Team Belarus	AT Racing Team	Ferrari 488 GT3	29	+31.951	20	5
6	70	B	Yaqi Zhang	Team China	Phantom Pro Racing Team	Mercedes-AMG GT3	29	+36.523	14	6
6	70	S	Kan Zang	Team China	Phantom Pro Racing Team	Mercedes-AMG GT3	29	+36.523	14	6
7	21	B	Gianluca Roda	Team Italy	AF Corse	Ferrari 488 GT3	29	+39.591	8	7
7	21	S	Giorgio Roda	Team Italy	AF Corse	Ferrari 488 GT3	29	+39.591	8	7
8	88	B	Louis Machiels	Team Belgium	Attempto Racing	Audi R8 LMS GT3 Evo (2019)	29	+39.882^{1}	21	8
8	88	S	Nico Verdonck	Team Belgium	Attempto Racing	Audi R8 LMS GT3 Evo (2019)	29	+39.882^{1}	21	8
9	4	B	Stephen Grove	Team Australia	Herberth Motorsport	Porsche 911 GT3 R	29	+49.625	10	9
9	4	S	Brenton Grove	Team Australia	Herberth Motorsport	Porsche 911 GT3 R	29	+49.625	10	9
10	519	B	Hiroshi Hamaguchi	Team Japan	Orange1 FFF Racing Team	Lamborghini Huracán GT3 Evo	29	+1:00.361	1	10
10	519	S	Ukyo Sasahara	Team Japan	Orange1 FFF Racing Team	Lamborghini Huracán GT3 Evo	29	+1:00.361	1	10
11	888	B	Rinat Salikhov	Team Russia	Team Russia	Ferrari 488 GT3	29	+1:27.621	3	11
11	888	S	Denis Bulatov	Team Russia	Team Russia	Ferrari 488 GT3	29	+1:27.621	3	11
12	911	B	Vutthikorn Inthraphuvasak	Team Thailand	Dinamic Motorsport	Porsche 911 GT3 R	28	+1 lap	11	12
12	911	S	Kantadhee Kusiri	Team Thailand	Dinamic Motorsport	Porsche 911 GT3 R	28	+1 lap	11	12
13	1	B	Salih Yoluç	Team Turkey	TF Sport	Aston Martin Vantage AMR GT3	28	+1 lap^{2}	2	13
13	1	S	Ayhancan Güven	Team Turkey	TF Sport	Aston Martin Vantage AMR GT3	28	+1 lap^{2}	2	13
14	87	B	Jean-Luc Beaubelique	Team France	AKKA-ASP	Mercedes-AMG GT3	27	+2 laps	19	14
14	87	S	Jim Pla	Team France	AKKA-ASP	Mercedes-AMG GT3	27	+2 laps	19	14
15	18	B	Robert Ferriol	(United States) Team USA	Spirit of Race	Ferrari 488 GT3	27	+2 laps	6	15
15	18	B	Spencer Pumpelly	(United States) Team USA	Spirit of Race	Ferrari 488 GT3	27	+2 laps	6	15
16	19	B	Alvaro Lobera	Team Spain	Racing Team Spain	Lamborghini Huracán GT3 Evo	27	+2 laps	12	16
16	19	S	Fernando Navarrete Jr.	Team Spain	Racing Team Spain	Lamborghini Huracán GT3 Evo	27	+2 laps	12	16
17	58	B	Christoph Lenz	Team Switzerland	Raton Racing	Lamborghini Huracán GT3 Evo	26	+3 laps	17	17
17	58	S	Patric Niederhauser	Team Switzerland	Raton Racing	Lamborghini Huracán GT3 Evo	26	+3 laps	17	17
18	68	B	Hanss Po Heng Lin	Team Chinese Taipei	Gama Racing	Lamborghini Huracán GT3 Evo	22	+7 laps	16	18
18	68	S	Evan Chen	Team Chinese Taipei	Gama Racing	Lamborghini Huracán GT3 Evo	22	+7 laps	16	18
Ret	16	B	Adrian Henry D'Silva	Team Malaysia	Earl Bamber Motorsport	Porsche 911 GT3 R	10	Retired	13	19
Ret	16	S	Weiron Tan	Team Malaysia	Earl Bamber Motorsport	Porsche 911 GT3 R	10	Retired	13	19
Ret	99	B	Miguel Ramos	Team Portugal	Attempto Racing	Audi R8 LMS GT3 Evo (2019)	8	Retired	4	20
Ret	99	S	Henrique Chaves	Team Portugal	Attempto Racing	Audi R8 LMS GT3 Evo (2019)	8	Retired	4	20
Ret	007	B	Khaled Al-Mudhaf	Team Kuwait	Optimum Motorsport	Aston Martin Vantage AMR GT3	0	Retired	22	21
Ret	007	S	Zaid Ashkanani	Team Kuwait	Optimum Motorsport	Aston Martin Vantage AMR GT3	0	Retired	22	21
DSQ	22	B	Paul Ip	Team Hong Kong	Reno Racing	Honda NSX GT3	28	Disqualified^{3}	15	22
DSQ	22	S	Marchy Lee	Team Hong Kong	Reno Racing	Honda NSX GT3	28	Disqualified^{3}	15	22

Notes

- ^1 – Team Belgium finished third but were penalised 30 seconds for driver Louis Machiels colliding with Khaled Al-Mudhaf.
- ^2 – Team Turkey finished 12th but received a 30-second time penalty for a driving standards infringement committed by driver Salih Yoluç.
- ^3 – Team Hong Kong were disqualified for a turbocharger boost pressure infringement.

=== Second qualifying race ===
The second qualifying race began at 09:30 local time on 3 November. Optimum Motorsport repaired the Kuwait Aston Martin in time for the race. Torrential rain fell on the circuit, forcing race control to start the race under safety car conditions. The safety car remained on track for four laps (ten minutes) after which racing commenced. On the opening lap of racing, Pla overtook Sasahara on the outside for the race lead approaching turn ten. As Pla took the lead, the rain increased in intensity, causing several drivers to run off the circuit. The Malaysian Porsche spun into the tyre barrier and the Russia Ferrari went off the circuit, prompting the safety car's deployment. The Russia entry retired from the race because of the accident against the tyre barrier that damaged the car's left-rear quarter. As the field formed up behind the safety car, Giorgio Roda's Italy Ferrari aquaplaned off into the gravel trap. This prompted race control to stop the race with a red flag because of the deterioration of circuit conditions. All cars entered the pit lane and teams switched drivers from their Silver-rated drivers to Bronze-rated racers during the stoppage. The Malaysian entry was returned to the pit lane and repairs to the car meant it rejoined the race two laps down.

Race control confirmed the race would recommence at 10:50 local time for another half an hour. The entries returned to the circuit behind the safety car as the Belarus Ferrari was issued a drive-through penalty for overtaking under safety car conditions earlier in the race. The safety car returned to the pit lane with 22 minutes remaining, and racing resumed with Beaubelique leading for France. Christopher Lenz overtook Hamaguchi for second as the Hong Kong car of Ip losing positions. Hamaguchi then passed Lenz to reclaim second as Chinese Taipei's Hanss Po Heng Lin overtook Lenz and made contact with Hamaguchi trying to pass him for second, resulting in Hamaguchi being shown the black-and-white flag. Hamaguchi pushed hard and overtook Beaubelique for the race lead with 17 and a half minutes left. Beaubelique and Lenz were under pressure and began to drop back into the field as Hamaguchi began to pull away from the rest of the field. Behind Hamaguchi, Chinese Taipei, Portugal and Poland formed a group of three vehicles while Switzerland and Belgium battled for fifth and sixth places.

Ramos challenged Lin for second and passed him for the position as Machiels overtook Lenz for fifth. Vutthikorn Inthraphuvasak moved Thailand from 12th to sixth by the penultimate lap. During the final three minutes, Ferriol was hit from behind by Zhang and was sent into the turn ten gravel trap. Zhang was issued with a drive-through penalty converted to a 30-second time penalty for the collision. A collision between Roda and Denmark's Jens Reno Møller on the straight leading into turn eight sent both cars spinning. Møller's car sustained damage that blocked the engine cooling and resulted in an engine failure that led to the car's retirement. The Turkey entry and the China car collided on the final lap, losing Yoluç time. Hamaguchi continued to pull away and achieved victory for Japan. Portugal finished 6.908 seconds behind in second and Chinese Taipei completed the podium positions in third. The remaining positions were occupied by Poland, Belgium, Thailand, Switzerland, Spain, Germany, the United Kingdom, France, Australia, Hong Kong, Belarus, Denmark, Turkey, Kuwait, China, Italy, Malaysia and the United States.

After the qualifying races, the grid for the main race was determined with Poland on pole position with the fewest points scored with seven. The rest of the grid lined up as Germany, Japan, Belgium, the United Kingdom, Denmark, Thailand, Belarus, Chinese Taipei, Australia, Portugal, China, Switzerland, Spain, France, Italy, Turkey, Russia, the United States, Hong Kong, Kuwait and Malaysia.

==== Qualifying Race 2 classification ====
Final classification of the second qualifying race
Pos	No.	Licence	Driver	Team	Entrant	Car	Laps	Time/Retired	Grid	Points
1	519	B	Hiroshi Hamaguchi	Team Japan	Orange1 FFF Racing Team	Lamborghini Huracán GT3 Evo	21	1:55:29.230	1	1
1	519	S	Ukyo Sasahara	Team Japan	Orange1 FFF Racing Team	Lamborghini Huracán GT3 Evo	21	1:55:29.230	1	1
2	99	B	Miguel Ramos	Team Portugal	Attempto Racing	Audi R8 LMS GT3 Evo (2019)	21	+6.908	7	2
2	99	S	Henrique Chaves	Team Portugal	Attempto Racing	Audi R8 LMS GT3 Evo (2019)	21	+6.908	7	2
3	68	B	Hanss Po Heng Lin	Team Chinese Taipei	Gama Racing	Lamborghini Huracán GT3 Evo	21	+8.669	9	3
3	68	S	Evan Chen	Team Chinese Taipei	Gama Racing	Lamborghini Huracán GT3 Evo	21	+8.669	9	3
4	66	B	Andrzej Lewandowski	Team Poland	Vincenzo Sospiri Racing	Lamborghini Huracán GT3 Evo	21	+8.993	10	4
4	66	S	Artur Janosz	Team Poland	Vincenzo Sospiri Racing	Lamborghini Huracán GT3 Evo	21	+8.993	10	4
5	88	B	Louis Machiels	Team Belgium	Attempto Racing	Audi R8 LMS GT3 Evo (2019)	21	+15.129	13	5
5	88	S	Nico Verdonck	Team Belgium	Attempto Racing	Audi R8 LMS GT3 Evo (2019)	21	+15.129	13	5
6	911	B	Vutthikorn Inthraphuvasak	Team Thailand	Dinamic Motorsport	Porsche 911 GT3 R	21	+19.621	15^{4}	6
6	911	S	Kantadhee Kusiri	Team Thailand	Dinamic Motorsport	Porsche 911 GT3 R	21	+19.621	15^{4}	6
7	58	B	Christoph Lenz	Team Switzerland	Raton Racing	Lamborghini Huracán GT3 Evo	21	+22.697	3	7
7	58	S	Patric Niederhauser	Team Switzerland	Raton Racing	Lamborghini Huracán GT3 Evo	21	+22.697	3	7
8	19	B	Alvaro Lobera	Team Spain	Racing Team Spain	Lamborghini Huracán GT3 Evo	21	+28.741	20	8
8	19	S	Fernando Navarrete Jr.	Team Spain	Racing Team Spain	Lamborghini Huracán GT3 Evo	21	+28.741	20	8
9	991	B	Steffen Görig	Team Germany	Herberth Motorsport	Porsche 911 GT3 R	21	+30.615	8	9
9	991	S	Alfred Renauer	Team Germany	Herberth Motorsport	Porsche 911 GT3 R	21	+30.615	8	9
10	93	B	Flick Haigh	(United Kingdom) Team UK	Tempesta Racing	Ferrari 488 GT3	21	+31.878	16	10
10	93	S	Chris Froggatt	(United Kingdom) Team UK	Tempesta Racing	Ferrari 488 GT3	21	+31.878	16	10
11	87	B	Jean-Luc Beaubelique	Team France	AKKA-ASP	Mercedes-AMG GT3	21	+35.550	2	11
11	87	S	Jim Pla	Team France	AKKA-ASP	Mercedes-AMG GT3	21	+35.550	2	11
12	4	B	Stephen Grove	Team Australia	Herberth Motorsport	Porsche 911 GT3 R	21	+36.914	4	12
12	4	S	Brenton Grove	Team Australia	Herberth Motorsport	Porsche 911 GT3 R	21	+36.914	4	12
13	22	B	Paul Ip	Team Hong Kong	Reno Racing	Honda NSX GT3	21	+55.132	19	13
13	22	S	Marchy Lee	Team Hong Kong	Reno Racing	Honda NSX GT3	21	+55.132	19	13
14	51	B	Alexander Talkanitsa Sr.	Team Belarus	AT Racing Team	Ferrari 488 GT3	21	+1:02.153	12	14
14	51	S	Alexander Talkanitsa Jr.	Team Belarus	AT Racing Team	Ferrari 488 GT3	21	+1:02.153	12	14
15	11	B	Jens Reno Møller	Team Denmark	Reno Racing	Honda NSX GT3	21	+1:19.918^{5}	22^{6}	15
15	11	S	Christina Nielsen	Team Denmark	Reno Racing	Honda NSX GT3	21	+1:19.918^{5}	22^{6}	15
16	1	B	Salih Yoluç	Team Turkey	TF Sport	Aston Martin Vantage AMR GT3	21	+1:35.195^{5}	14	16
16	1	S	Ayhancan Güven	Team Turkey	TF Sport	Aston Martin Vantage AMR GT3	21	+1:35.195^{5}	14	16
17	007	B	Khaled Al-Mudhaf	Team Kuwait	Optimum Motorsport	Aston Martin Vantage AMR GT3	21	+1:46.035	17	17
17	007	S	Zaid Ashkanani	Team Kuwait	Optimum Motorsport	Aston Martin Vantage AMR GT3	21	+1:46.035	17	17
18	70	B	Yaqi Zhang	Team China	Phantom Pro Racing Team	Mercedes-AMG GT3	21	+1:48.507^{5}	21	18
18	70	S	Kan Zang	Team China	Phantom Pro Racing Team	Mercedes-AMG GT3	21	+1:48.507^{5}	21	18
19	21	B	Gianluca Roda	Team Italy	AF Corse	Ferrari 488 GT3	19	+2 laps	18	19
19	21	S	Giorgio Roda	Team Italy	AF Corse	Ferrari 488 GT3	19	+2 laps	18	19
20	16	B	Adrian Henry D'Silva	Team Malaysia	Earl Bamber Motorsport	Porsche 911 GT3 R	19	+2 laps	6	20
20	16	S	Weiron Tan	Team Malaysia	Earl Bamber Motorsport	Porsche 911 GT3 R	19	+2 laps	6	20
21	18	B	Robert Ferriol	(United States) Team USA	Spirit of Race	Ferrari 488 GT3	18	+3 laps	11	21
21	18	B	Spencer Pumpelly	(United States) Team USA	Spirit of Race	Ferrari 488 GT3	18	+3 laps	11	21
Ret	888	B	Rinat Salikhov	Team Russia	Team Russia	Ferrari 488 GT3	5	Retired	5	22
Ret	888	S	Denis Bulatov	Team Russia	Team Russia	Ferrari 488 GT3	5	Retired	5	22

Notes

- ^4 – Team Thailand received a three-place grid penalty for an accident in the first qualifying race.
- ^5 – Imposed a 30-second time penalty.
- ^6 – Team Denmark was ordered to start from the back of the grid after driver Christina Nielsen failed to slow down fast enough for a stoppage during free practice.

== Main race ==
The one-hour main race commenced on a drying circuit that was still damp at 14:25 local time on 3 November. A total of 22 cars were due to take the start but the Denmark Honda was withdrawn due to the damage it sustained in the second qualifying race, reducing the number of entrants to 21. The Russia Ferrari was rebuilt with a change of chassis in order to allow for its participation. A few teams such as Switzerland (Lenz) began the race on dry tyres as Belarus, Kuwait and Russia made pit stops to switch from full wet to dry tyres when the race began. Poland led the start, before Hamaguchi overtook Lewandowski heading towards turn four on lap four on six minutes. As Hamaguchi began to pull away from the field, Inthraphuvasak passed Lewandowski for second. Lenz then received a penalty for minor contact with another car that resulted in frontal damage that would effect Switzerland for the reminder of the race. Alvaro Lobera for Spain ran wide at hit Gianluca Roda of Italy, causing Lobera to spin and retire on lap six.

Gianluca Roda was unscathed from the collision with Lobera and was running in fifth position after 15 minutes with Kuwait's Zaid Ashkanani seventh. One lap later, Gianluca Roda had progressed to third with Ashkanani fifth. Gianluca Roda looked set to challenge Hamaguchi for the race lead until he made an error. He ran onto a wet patch of track at the exit to turn nine and went onto the infield. Gianluca Roda crashed into the tyre wall and sustained enough damage to the Ferrari's right-front corner to necessitate Italy's retirement. Russia were now the highest-placed team to run on slick tyres and driver Salikhov passed Ashkanani for fifth. As the time for pit stops to change drivers approached, rain returned to the circuit after 20 minutes had elapsed. The change in conditions meant cars such as those from Japan, Thailand and Poland fitted with wet-weather tyres had a pace advantage. Although he had to complete an additional lap than his cloest competitors because of the timing against the pit stop window, Hamaguchi entered the pit lane with 33 minutes left and was relieved by Sasahara. This promoted Inthraphuvasak to the lead as he had decided to remain on track for one more lap but he spun into the turn three gravel trap and retired. Portugal's Ramos led China's Zhang before the two made pit stops.

With 24 minutes remaining, the safety car was deployed to allow for the recovery of Thailand's car and closed up the field with Sasahara leading Ramos and Poland's Janosz. Racing was resumed with 18 minutes left, with a battle between Australia, Belgium and Germany. Janosz overtook Ramos for second position as Ramos fell to 11th. Belgium's Verdonck sent Germany's Renauer into a spin into the turn five gravel trap and into retirement. This incident, along with a deterioration in the weather, prompted the safety car's second deployment. As the rain increased in intensity and there was a lack of time for further racing, the race concluded under safety car conditions. This gave the gold medal to Hamaguchi and Sasahara of Japan. Poland's Lewandowski and Janosz won the silver medal and the father and son combination of Stephen and Brenton Grove earned Australia the bronze medal. After the race, Belgium were issued a 30-second time penalty in lieu of a drive-through penalty for the collision with Germany.

=== Main race classification ===
Final classification of the main race
Pos	No.	Licence	Driver	Team	Entrant	Car	Laps	Gap/Retired	Grid
1st place, gold medalist(s)	519	B	Hiroshi Hamaguchi	Team Japan	Orange1 FFF Racing Team	Lamborghini Huracán GT3 Evo	28	1:00:54.702	3
1st place, gold medalist(s)	519	S	Ukyo Sasahara	Team Japan	Orange1 FFF Racing Team	Lamborghini Huracán GT3 Evo	28	1:00:54.702	3
2nd place, silver medalist(s)	66	B	Andrzej Lewandowski	Team Poland	Vincenzo Sospiri Racing	Lamborghini Huracán GT3 Evo	28	+3.012	1
2nd place, silver medalist(s)	66	S	Artur Janosz	Team Poland	Vincenzo Sospiri Racing	Lamborghini Huracán GT3 Evo	28	+3.012	1
3rd place, bronze medalist(s)	4	B	Stephen Grove	Team Australia	Herberth Motorsport	Porsche 911 GT3 R	28	+5.095	10
3rd place, bronze medalist(s)	4	S	Brenton Grove	Team Australia	Herberth Motorsport	Porsche 911 GT3 R	28	+5.095	10
4	87	B	Jean-Luc Beaubelique	Team France	AKKA-ASP	Mercedes-AMG GT3	28	+5.417	15
4	87	S	Jim Pla	Team France	AKKA-ASP	Mercedes-AMG GT3	28	+5.417	15
5	70	B	Yaqi Zhang	Team China	Phantom Pro Racing Team	Mercedes-AMG GT3	28	+7.095	12
5	70	S	Kan Zang	Team China	Phantom Pro Racing Team	Mercedes-AMG GT3	28	+7.095	12
6	22	B	Paul Ip	Team Hong Kong	Reno Racing	Honda NSX GT3	28	+8.509	20
6	22	S	Marchy Lee	Team Hong Kong	Reno Racing	Honda NSX GT3	28	+8.509	20
7	888	B	Rinat Salikhov	Team Russia	Team Russia	Ferrari 488 GT3	28	+9.175	18
7	888	S	Denis Bulatov	Team Russia	Team Russia	Ferrari 488 GT3	28	+9.175	18
8	18	B	Robert Ferriol	(United States) Team USA	Spirit of Race	Ferrari 488 GT3	28	+10.124	14
8	18	B	Spencer Pumpelly	(United States) Team USA	Spirit of Race	Ferrari 488 GT3	28	+10.124	14
9	88	B	Louis Machiels	Team Belgium	Attempto Racing	Audi R8 LMS GT3 Evo (2019)	28	+33.449^{7}	4
9	88	S	Nico Verdonck	Team Belgium	Attempto Racing	Audi R8 LMS GT3 Evo (2019)	28	+33.449^{7}	4
10	99	B	Miguel Ramos	Team Portugal	Attempto Racing	Audi R8 LMS GT3 Evo (2019)	28	+41.686	11
10	99	S	Henrique Chaves	Team Portugal	Attempto Racing	Audi R8 LMS GT3 Evo (2019)	28	+41.686	11
11	16	B	Adrian Henry D'Silva	Team Malaysia	Earl Bamber Motorsport	Porsche 911 GT3 R	27	+1 lap	22
11	16	S	Weiron Tan	Team Malaysia	Earl Bamber Motorsport	Porsche 911 GT3 R	27	+1 lap	22
12	1	B	Salih Yoluç	Team Turkey	TF Sport	Aston Martin Vantage AMR GT3	27	+1 lap	17
12	1	S	Ayhancan Güven	Team Turkey	TF Sport	Aston Martin Vantage AMR GT3	27	+1 lap	17
13	51	B	Alexander Talkanitsa Sr.	Team Belarus	AT Racing Team	Ferrari 488 GT3	27	+1 lap	8
13	51	S	Alexander Talkanitsa Jr.	Team Belarus	AT Racing Team	Ferrari 488 GT3	27	+1 lap	8
14	007	B	Khaled Al-Mudhaf	Team Kuwait	Optimum Motorsport	Aston Martin Vantage AMR GT3	27	+1 lap	21
14	007	S	Zaid Ashkanani	Team Kuwait	Optimum Motorsport	Aston Martin Vantage AMR GT3	27	+1 lap	21
15	93	B	Flick Haigh	(United Kingdom) Team UK	Tempesta Racing	Ferrari 488 GT3	27	+1 lap	5
15	93	S	Chris Froggatt	(United Kingdom) Team UK	Tempesta Racing	Ferrari 488 GT3	27	+1 lap	5
16	991	B	Steffen Görig	Team Germany	Herberth Motorsport	Porsche 911 GT3 R	21	+7 laps	2
16	991	S	Alfred Renauer	Team Germany	Herberth Motorsport	Porsche 911 GT3 R	21	+7 laps	2
17	58	B	Christoph Lenz	Team Switzerland	Raton Racing	Lamborghini Huracán GT3 Evo	19	+9 laps	13
17	58	S	Patric Niederhauser	Team Switzerland	Raton Racing	Lamborghini Huracán GT3 Evo	19	+9 laps	13
Ret	911	B	Vutthikorn Inthraphuvasak	Team Thailand	Dinamic Motorsport	Porsche 911 GT3 R	15	Retired	7
Ret	911	S	Kantadhee Kusiri	Team Thailand	Dinamic Motorsport	Porsche 911 GT3 R	15	Retired	7
Ret	21	B	Gianluca Roda	Team Italy	AF Corse	Ferrari 488 GT3	9	Retired	16
Ret	21	S	Giorgio Roda	Team Italy	AF Corse	Ferrari 488 GT3	9	Retired	16
Ret	68	B	Hanss Po Heng Lin	Team Chinese Taipei	Gama Racing	Lamborghini Huracán GT3 Evo	7	Retired	9
Ret	68	S	Evan Chen	Team Chinese Taipei	Gama Racing	Lamborghini Huracán GT3 Evo	7	Retired	9
Ret	19	B	Alvaro Lobera	Team Spain	Racing Team Spain	Lamborghini Huracán GT3 Evo	5	Retired	19
Ret	19	S	Fernando Navarrete Jr.	Team Spain	Racing Team Spain	Lamborghini Huracán GT3 Evo	5	Retired	19
WD	11	B	Jens Reno Møller	Team Denmark	Reno Racing	Honda NSX GT3	0	Withdrawn^{8}	6
WD	11	S	Christina Nielsen	Team Denmark	Reno Racing	Honda NSX GT3	0	Withdrawn^{8}	6

Notes

- ^7 – Team Belgium received a 30-second time penalty for an accident with Team Germany.
- ^8 – Team Denmark did not start the main race due to heavy damage sustained to its car in an accident during the second qualifying race.
