= Louis Machiels =

Belgian racing driver (born 1971)

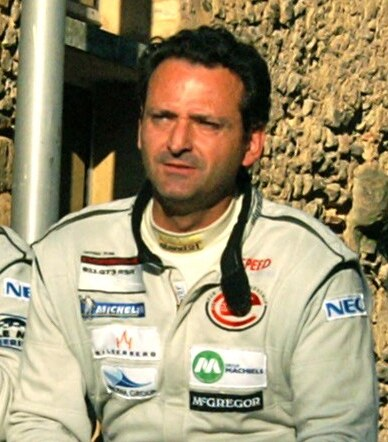
- Machiels at the 2010 24 Hours of Le Mans drivers' parade.
- Nationality: (Belgium) Belgian
- Born: Louis Gerardus Joseph Machiels; 17 January 1971 (age 55) Hasselt, Belgium
- Relatives: Jef Machiels (son); Jules Castro (stepson)
- Categorisation: FIA Bronze

Championship titles
- 2022 2012 2011: GT World Challenge Europe Endurance Cup – Pro-Am; Blancpain Endurance Series – Pro-Am; Blancpain Endurance Series – GT3 Pro-Am

Louis Gerardus Joseph Machiels (born 17 January 1971) is a Belgian businessman and former racing driver.

A long-term GT World Challenge Europe competitor for AF Corse, he was overall Pro-Am Cup champion in 2019 and won its Blancpain Endurance Series counterpart in 2011, 2012 and 2022. He often co-drove with Ferrari factory driver Andrea Bertolini.

== Personal life and business ventures ==
Machiels' grandfather Louis Machiels Sr. founded the Machiels Group in 1941, which was then taken over by his father Jef Machiels Sr. in 1973. In 2004, Machiels took over the company from his father. His son Jef Machiels Jr. and stepson Jules Castro are also racing drivers. In 2007, the Machiels family was ranked as the joint-12th richest family in Limburg.

== Career ==
Machiels began his racing career in 1997, partaking in select rounds of the FFSA GT Championship for GLPK Racing. Following that, Machiels primarily raced in Ferrari Challenge Europe until 2008, most notably finishing third in the 2004 Trofeo Pirelli standings. In 2009, Machiels won the 24 Hours of Zolder and raced in the 24 Hours of Spa for Porsche-fielding Prospeed Competition. The following year, Machiels returned to the team to race in the GT2 classes of the 24 Hours of Le Mans, 24 Hours of Spa and the 1000 km of Spa.

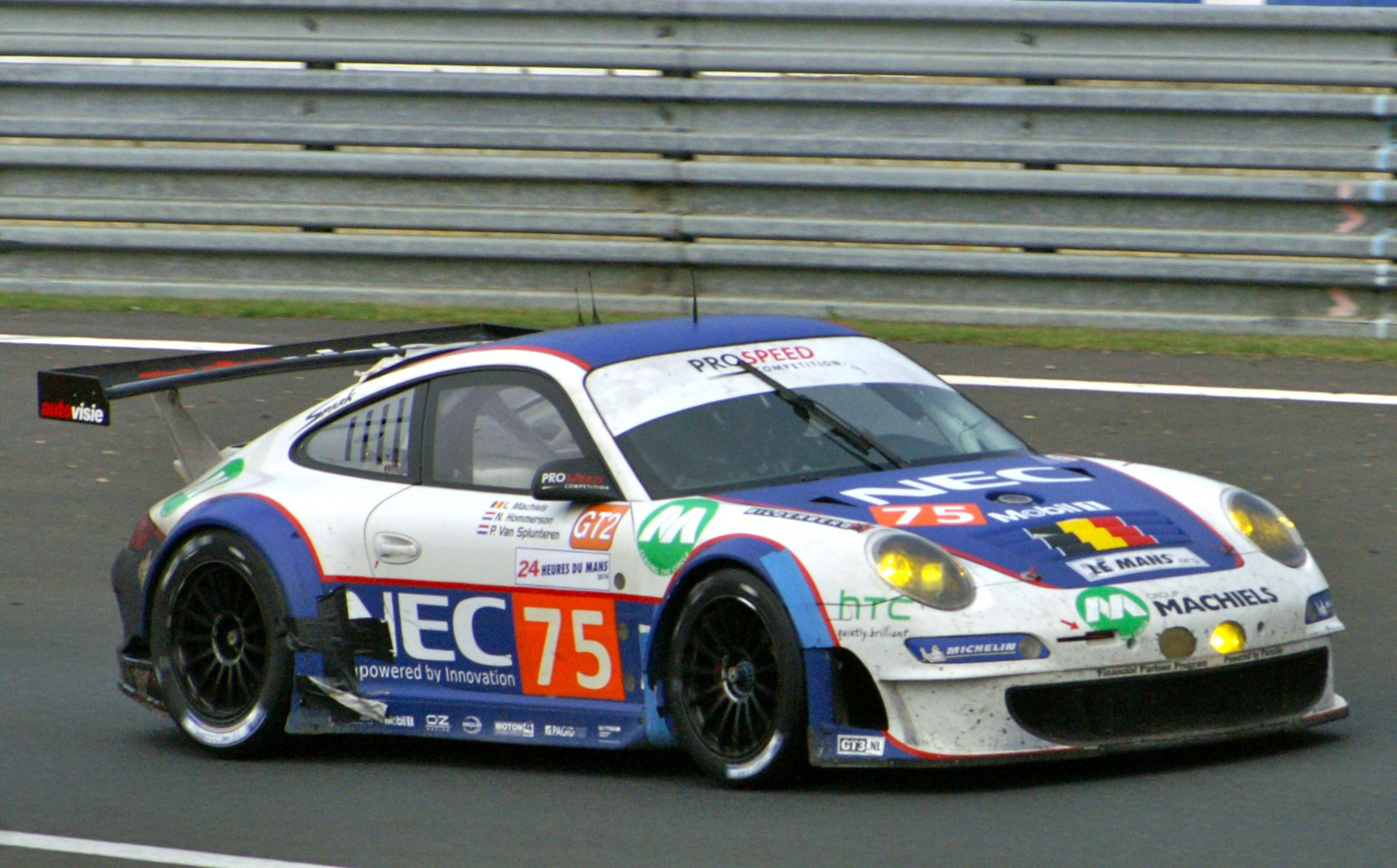
Machiels made his only 24h Le Mans start in 2010 at the wheel of a Prospeed Competition Porsche.

Returning to Ferrari machinery for 2011, Machiels joined Vita4One to race in the GT3 Pro-Am class of the Blancpain Endurance Series, which he won alongside Niek Hommerson after taking class wins at Magny-Cours and Silverstone. Switching to AF Corse for the 2012 season, Machiels and Hommerson began a long-standing partnership with Ferrari factory driver Andrea Bertolini, who helped them to a second Pro-Am title with class wins at Le Castellet and the 24 Hours of Spa. Remaining with the Italian team for the following season, Machiels scored a lone class win at Monza to take fifth in the Pro-Am standings. Following that, Machiels only raced at the 24 Hours of Spa across the following two years, winning it in Pro-Am for AF Corse in 2014 and racing for Bentley Team HTP the following year.

Following a season with Lamborghini-affiliated Attempto Racing, Machiels joined AF Corse-run Spirit of Race for 2017, taking a lone Pro-Am podium at Monza en route to a 13th-place points finish in class. Returning to the Italian team the following year, he took a class podium at Monza for the second consecutive season as he ended the year 14th in points. During 2018, Machiels also raced at the 24 Hours of Daytona for Lamborghini-linked GRT Grasser Racing Team in GTD. Continuing with AF Corse, Machiels raced with Bertolini in a dual programme in the Pro-Am classes of both the Blancpain GT Series Endurance Cup and the Blancpain GT World Challenge Europe. In the former, Machiels scored a win at Silverstone to take seventh in the standings, whereas in the latter, he took wins at Misano and the Nürburgring en route to a fourth-place points finish. During 2019, Machiels also represented Belgium in the FIA Motorsport Games GT Cup, partnering Nico Verdonck in an Attempto-run Audi.

In 2020, Machiels remained with AF Corse to continue in the newly-renamed GT World Challenge Europe Endurance Cup and GT World Challenge Europe Sprint Cup. Finishing a lowly 10th in the former, Machiels found more success in the latter, in which he took a win at Misano and two at Barcelona to clinch runner-up honors. Continuing for an identical effort in 2021, Machiels finished on the Pro-Am podium at the 24 Hours of Spa in the former, and clinched two Sprint Cup class wins to take third in Pro-Am. Staying for a fourth consecutive dual programme in 2022, Machiels scored seven Sprint Cup podiums to clinch third in Pro-Am, but found more success in the Endurance Cup, winning at the Hockenheimring and the 24 Hours of Spa to secure his third class title.

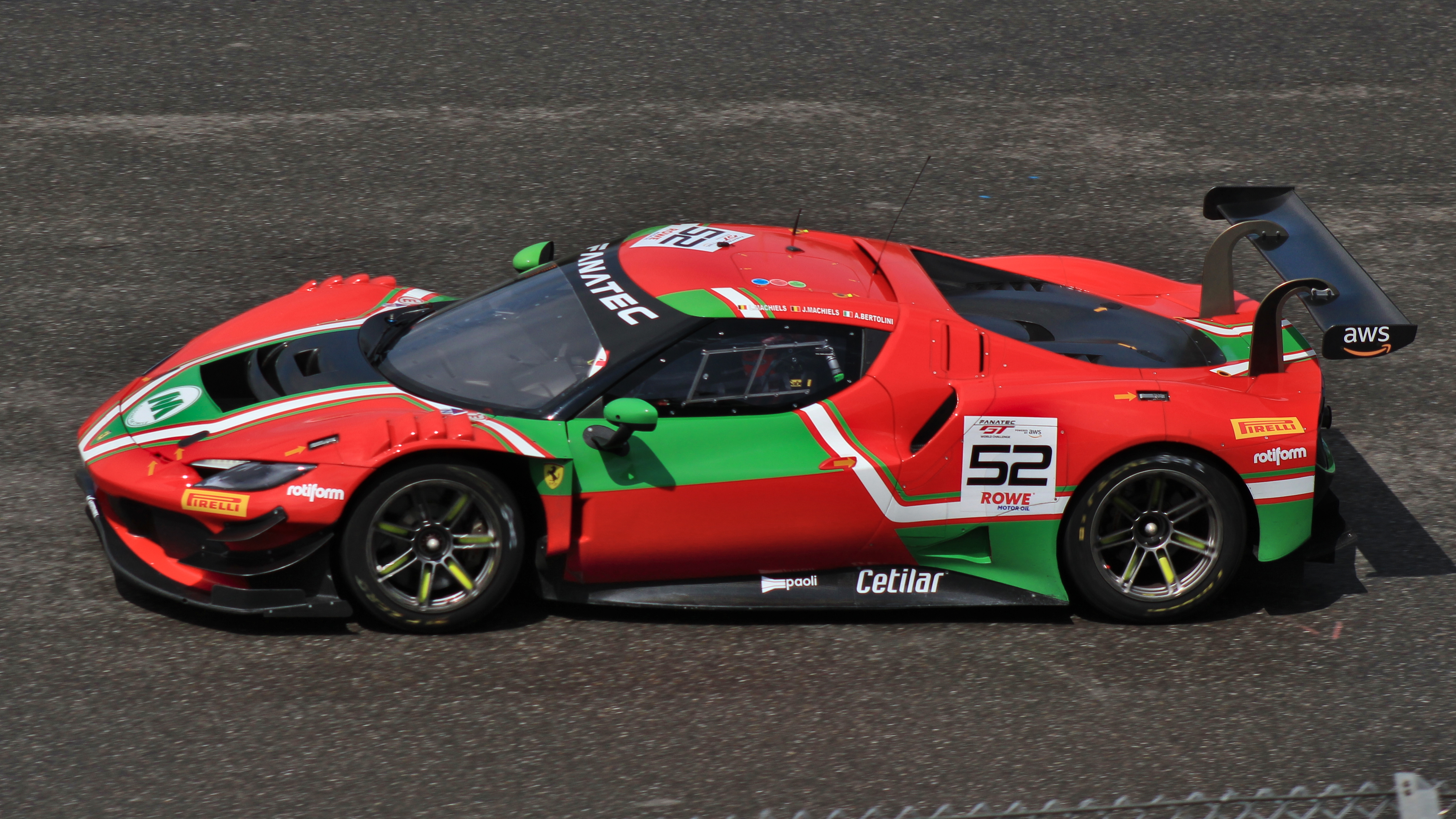
Machiels driving his AF Corse Ferrari 296 GT3 at the Nürburgring in 2024.

In 2023, Machiels was joined by son Jef Machiels to contest another dual campaign in both the Endurance and Sprint Cups in the newly-created Bronze Cup, which only yielded a singular class podium in the former at Le Castellet. Downscaling to only the Endurance Cup for 2024, Machiels finished second at both Le Castellet and the 24 Hours of Spa en route to runner-up honors in Bronze. Machiels then stayed with the team for one last season in 2025, failing to secure a podium as he ended the year 21st in points. After teammate Andrea Bertolini opted to hang up his helmet mid-season, Machiels formally retired from motorsport at the end of the year.

== Karting record ==
=== Karting career summary ===
Season	Series	Team	Position
1987	Karting World Championship — Formula K		20th
1989	Karting World Championship — Formula K		7th
1990	Karting World Championship — Formula Super A	GKS Lemmens Power	32nd

== Racing record ==
=== Racing career summary ===
Season	Series	Team	Races	Wins	Poles	F/Laps	Podiums	Points	Position
1997	French GT Championship	GLPK Racing	2	0	0	0	0	0	NC
1999	Ferrari Porsche Challenge – Class A							18	14th
2004	Ferrari Challenge Europe – Trofeo Pirelli							101	**3rd**
2005	Ferrari Challenge Europe – Trofeo Pirelli	Ferrari Antwerpen						58	7th
2006	Ferrari Challenge Europe – Trofeo Pirelli							49	10th
2007	Ferrari Challenge Europe – Trofeo Pirelli	Ferrari Antwerpen	10	0	0	0	0	78	12th
2008	Ferrari Challenge Europe – Trofeo Pirelli	Ferrari Antwerpen						120	8th
2009	24 Hours of Zolder	Prospeed Competition	1	1	0	0	1	—N/a	**1st**
2009	FIA GT Championship – GT2	Prospeed Competition	1	0	0	0	0	0	NC
2010	Le Mans Series – GT2	Prospeed Competition	1	0	0	0	0	3	24th
2010	24 Hours of Le Mans – LMGT2	Prospeed Competition	1	0	0	0	0	—N/a	7th
2010	24 Hours of Spa – GT2	Prospeed Competition	1	0	0	0	0	—N/a	4th
2010	Trofeo Maserati Europe		1	0	0	0	0	2	26th
2011	Blancpain Endurance Series – GT3 Pro-Am	Vita4One	5	2	0	0	3	101	**1st**
2011	Belcar – GT3	Vita4One	1	0	0	0	0	2	23rd
2012	Blancpain Endurance Series – Pro-Am	AF Corse	5	2	0	0	2	76	**1st**
2012	City Challenge Baku – GT	V40 Italy	1	0	0	0	0	—N/a	DSQ
2013	Blancpain Endurance Series – Pro-Am	AF Corse	5	1	0	0	1	50	5th
2014	Blancpain Endurance Series – Pro-Am	AF Corse	1	1	0	0	1	31	9th
2015	Porsche GT3 Cup Challenge Benelux – Am	GT3.nl by Land Motorsport	2	0	0	0	2	17	7th
2015	24 Hours of Zolder – Class 1 CN 2000	Bas Koeten Racing	1	0	0	0	0	—N/a	DNF
2015	Blancpain Endurance Series – Pro-Am	Bentley Team HTP	1	0	0	0	0	4	27th
2016	Blancpain GT Series Endurance Cup	Attempto Racing	4	0	0	0	0	0	NC
2016	Blancpain GT Series Endurance Cup – Pro-Am	Attempto Racing	4	0	0	0	0	17	27th
2016	Intercontinental GT Challenge – Am	Attempto Racing	1	0	0	0	0	0	NC
2017	Blancpain GT Series Endurance Cup	Spirit of Race	5	0	0	0	0	0	NC
2017	Blancpain GT Series Endurance Cup – Pro-Am	Spirit of Race	5	0	0	0	1	35	13th
2017	Intercontinental GT Challenge	Spirit of Race	1	0	0	0	0	0	NC
2018	IMSA SportsCar Championship – GTD	GRT Grasser Racing Team	1	0	0	0	0	18	57th
2018	Blancpain GT Series Endurance Cup	AF Corse	5	0	0	0	0	0	NC
2018	Blancpain GT Series Endurance Cup – Pro-Am	AF Corse	5	0	0	0	1	33	14th
2019	Blancpain GT Series Endurance Cup	AF Corse	5	0	0	0	0	0	NC
2019	Blancpain GT Series Endurance Cup – Pro-Am	AF Corse	5	1	0	0	1	51	7th
2019	Blancpain GT World Challenge Europe	AF Corse	10	0	0	0	0	0	NC
2019	Blancpain GT World Challenge Europe – Pro-Am	AF Corse	10	2	0	0	8	96	4th
2019	Intercontinental GT Challenge	AF Corse	1	0	0	0	0	0	NC
2019	FIA Motorsport Games GT Cup	Team Belgium	1	0	0	0	0	—N/a	9th
2020	GT World Challenge Europe Endurance Cup	AF Corse	4	0	0	0	0	0	NC
2020	GT World Challenge Europe Endurance Cup – Pro-Am	AF Corse	4	0	0	0	0	38	10th
2020	GT World Challenge Europe Sprint Cup	AF Corse	10	0	0	0	0	0	NC
2020	GT World Challenge Europe Sprint Cup – Pro-Am	AF Corse	10	3	0	0	8	117.5	**2nd**
2020	Intercontinental GT Challenge	AF Corse	1	0	0	0	0	0	NC
2021	24H GT Series – GT3 Pro	Team WRT	1	0	0	0	1	26	NC
2021	GT World Challenge Europe Endurance Cup – Pro-Am	AF Corse	5	0	0	0	1	54	8th
2021	GT World Challenge Europe Sprint Cup	AF Corse	10	0	0	0	0	0	NC
2021	GT World Challenge Europe Sprint Cup – Pro-Am	AF Corse	10	2	0	0	6	107	**3rd**
2021	Intercontinental GT Challenge	AF Corse	1	0	0	0	0	0	NC
2022	GT World Challenge Europe Endurance Cup	AF Corse	5	0	0	0	0	0	NC
2022	GT World Challenge Europe Endurance Cup – Pro-Am	AF Corse	5	2	0	0	5	118	**1st**
2022	GT World Challenge Europe Sprint Cup	AF Corse	10	0	0	0	0	0	NC
2022	GT World Challenge Europe Sprint Cup – Pro-Am	AF Corse	10	0	0	0	7	95	**3rd**
2023	GT World Challenge Europe Endurance Cup	AF Corse	5	0	0	0	0	0	NC
2023	GT World Challenge Europe Endurance Cup – Bronze	AF Corse	5	0	0	0	1	34	11th
2023	GT World Challenge Europe Sprint Cup	AF Corse	6	0	0	0	0	0	NC
2023	GT World Challenge Europe Sprint Cup – Bronze	AF Corse	6	0	0	0	0	12	11th
2024	GT World Challenge Europe Endurance Cup	AF Corse	5	0	0	0	0	10	21st
2024	GT World Challenge Europe Endurance Cup – Bronze	AF Corse	5	0	0	0	2	72	**2nd**
2025	GT World Challenge Europe Endurance Cup	AF Corse - Francorchamps Motors	5	0	0	0	0	0	NC
2025	GT World Challenge Europe Endurance Cup – Bronze	AF Corse - Francorchamps Motors	5	0	0	0	0	19	21st
2025	Intercontinental GT Challenge	AF Corse - Francorchamps Motors	1	0	0	0	0	0	NC

=== Complete FIA GT Championship results ===
(key) (Races in bold indicate pole position) (Races in italics indicate fastest lap)

Year	Team	Car	Class	1	2	3	4	5	6	7	8	9	10	Pos.	Pts
2009	Prospeed Competition	Porsche 997 GT3-RSR	GT2	SIL	ADR	OSC	SPA; 6H; DSQ	SPA; 12H; DSQ	SPA; 24H; DSQ	BUD	ALG	PAU	ZOL	NC	0

=== Complete European Le Mans Series results ===
(key) (Races in bold indicate pole position; results in italics indicate fastest lap)

Year	Entrant	Class	Chassis	Engine	1	2	3	4	5	Rank	Points
2010	Prospeed Competition	GT2	Porsche 997 GT3-RSR	Porsche 4.0 L Flat-6	LEC	SPA; 13	ALG	HUN	SIL	24th	3

=== 24 Hours of Le Mans results ===
Year	Team	Co-Drivers	Car	Class	Laps	Pos.	Class Pos.
2010	(Belgium) Prospeed Competition	(Netherlands) Paul van Splunteren (Netherlands) Niek Hommerson	Porsche 997 GT3-RSR	GT2	311	21st	7th

=== Complete GT World Challenge results ===
==== GT World Challenge Europe Endurance Cup ====
(Races in bold indicate pole position) (Races in italics indicate fastest lap)

Year	Team	Car	Class	1	2	3	4	5	6	7	8	Pos.	Points
2011	Vita4One	Ferrari 458 Italia GT3	GT3 Pro-Am	MNZ; 13	NAV; 8	SPA; 6H ?	SPA; 12H ?	SPA; 24H; 33	MAG; 6	SIL; 8		1st	101
2012	AF Corse	Ferrari 458 Italia GT3	Pro-Am	MNZ; 17	SIL; 18	LEC; 4	SPA; 6H ?	SPA; 12H ?	SPA; 24H; 5	NÜR; Ret	NAV; 16	1st	76
2013	AF Corse	Ferrari 458 Italia GT3	Pro-Am	MNZ; 5	SIL; 20	LEC; Ret	SPA; 6H ?	SPA; 12H ?	SPA; 24H; 32	NÜR; Ret		5th	50
2014	AF Corse	Ferrari 458 Italia GT3	Pro-Am	MNZ	SIL	LEC	SPA; 6H; 19	SPA; 12H; 13	SPA; 24H; 6	NÜR		9th	31
2015	Bentley Team HTP	Bentley Continental GT3	Pro-Am	MNZ	SIL	LEC	SPA; 6H; 19	SPA; 12H; 45	SPA; 24H; Ret	NÜR		27th	4
2016	Attempto Racing	Lamborghini Huracán GT3	Pro-Am	MNZ; 23	SIL; 44	LEC	SPA; 6H; 15	SPA; 12H; 26	SPA; 24H; 52	NÜR; 49		27th	17
2017	Spirit of Race	Ferrari 488 GT3	Pro-Am	MNZ; 15	SIL; 33	LEC; 17	SPA; 6H; 23	SPA; 12H; 38	SPA; 24H; Ret	CAT; Ret		13th	35
2018	AF Corse	Ferrari 488 GT3	Pro-Am	MNZ; 23	SIL; 43	LEC; Ret	SPA; 6H; 40	SPA; 12H; 37	SPA; 24H; 26	CAT; Ret		14th	33
2019	AF Corse	Ferrari 488 GT3	Pro-Am	MNZ; Ret	SIL; 22	LEC; 28	SPA; 6H; 53	SPA; 12H; 59	SPA; 24H; Ret	CAT; 35		7th	51
2020	AF Corse	Ferrari 488 GT3	Pro-Am	IMO; 26	NÜR; 23	SPA; 6H; 32	SPA; 12H; 29	SPA; 24H; 35	LEC; Ret			10th	38
2021	AF Corse	Ferrari 488 GT3 Evo 2020	Pro-Am	MNZ; 29	LEC; Ret	SPA; 6H; 25	SPA; 12H; 20	SPA; 24H; 17	NÜR; 30	CAT; 31		9th	54
2022	AF Corse	Ferrari 488 GT3 Evo 2020	Pro-Am	IMO; 33	LEC; 26	SPA; 6H; 35	SPA; 12H; 29	SPA; 24H; 20	HOC; 30	CAT; 39		1st	118
2023	AF Corse	Ferrari 488 GT3 Evo 2020	Bronze	MNZ; 36	LEC; 16	SPA; 6H; 57	SPA; 12H; 32	SPA; 24H; 26				11th	34
2023	AF Corse	Ferrari 296 GT3	Bronze						NÜR; 36	CAT; 31		11th	34
2024	AF Corse	Ferrari 296 GT3	Bronze	LEC; 23	SPA; 6H; 9	SPA; 12H; 2	SPA; 24H; 13	NÜR; 40	MNZ; Ret	JED; 25		2nd	72
2025	AF Corse - Francorchamps Motors	Ferrari 296 GT3	Bronze	LEC; 45	MNZ; 20	SPA; 6H; 53	SPA; 12H; 37	SPA; 24H; 33	NÜR; 45	CAT; 40		21st	19

^{†} Did not finish, but was classified as he had completed more than 90% of the race distance.

==== GT World Challenge Europe Sprint Cup ====
Year	Team	Car	Class	1	2	3	4	5	6	7	8	9	10	Pos.	Points
2019	AF Corse	Ferrari 488 GT3	Pro-Am	BRH; 1 Ret	BRH; 2 Ret	MIS; 1; 11	MIS; 2; 21	ZAN; 1; 20	ZAN; 2; 19	NÜR; 1; 23	NÜR; 2; 19	HUN; 1; 23	HUN; 2; 26	4th	96
2020	AF Corse	Ferrari 488 GT3	Pro-Am	MIS; 1; 13	MIS; 2; 13	MIS; 3; 13	MAG; 1; 18	MAG; 2; 15	ZAN; 1; 16	ZAN; 2; 13	CAT; 1; 16	CAT; 2; 15	CAT; 3; 12	2nd	117.5
2021	AF Corse	Ferrari 488 GT3 Evo 2020	Pro-Am	MAG; 1; 18	MAG; 2; 19	ZAN; 1; 21	ZAN; 2; 22	MIS; 1; 25	MIS; 2; 25	BRH; 1; 22	BRH; 2; 26	VAL; 1; 19	VAL; 2; 23	3rd	107
2022	AF Corse	Ferrari 488 GT3 Evo 2020	Pro-Am	BRH; 1; 18	BRH; 2; 19	MAG; 1; 23	MAG; 2 Ret	ZAN; 1; 16	ZAN; 2; 18	MIS; 1; 18	MIS; 2; 18	VAL; 1; 18	VAL; 2; 24	3rd	95
2023	AF Corse	Ferrari 296 GT3	Bronze	MIS; 1; 35	MIS; 2; 30	HOC; 1 Ret	HOC; 2; 27	VAL; 1; 35	VAL; 2; 32					11th	12

=== Complete IMSA SportsCar Championship results ===
(key) (Races in bold indicate pole position; races in italics indicate fastest lap)

Year	Entrant	Class	Make	Engine	1	2	3	4	5	6	7	8	9	10	11	Rank	Points
2018	GRT Grasser Racing Team	GTD	Lamborghini Huracán GT3	Lamborghini DGF 5.2 L V10	DAY; 13	SEB	MDO	BEL	WGL	MOS	LIM	ELK	VIR	LGA	PET	57th	18
