= Ukyo Sasahara =

Japanese racing driver (born 1996)

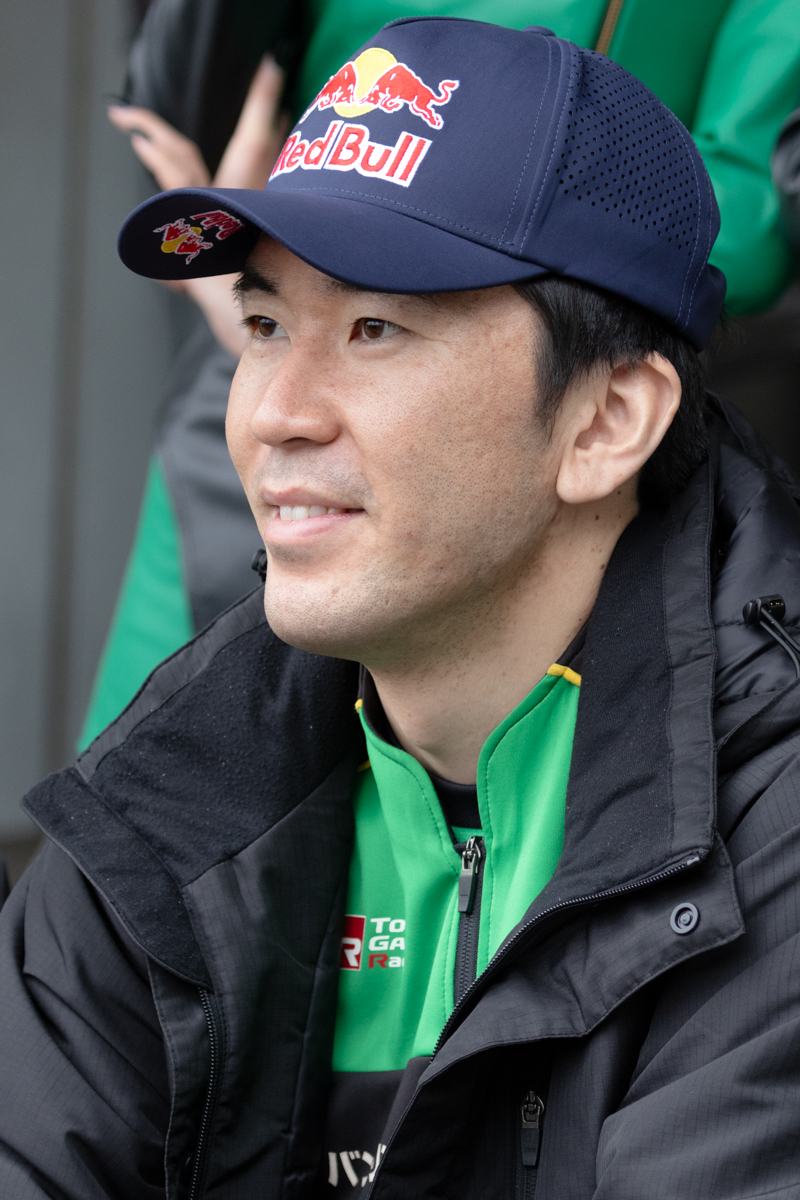
- Sasahara at Suzuka Circuit in November 2024
- Nationality: (Japan) Japanese
- Born: 24 April 1996 (age 30) Numata, Gunma, Japan

Super GT - GT500 career
- Debut season: 2020
- Current team: Team Deloitte TOM'S
- Categorisation: FIA Silver (until 2019); FIA Gold (2020–)
- Car number: 37
- Former teams: Team Mugen
- Starts: 56
- Wins: 3
- Podiums: 7
- Poles: 2
- Fastest laps: 0
- Best finish: 5th in 2024

Previous series
- 2024 2020–2024 2019 2019–20 2018–19 2017 2016 2014–15 2014 2013, 15 2013: SRO Japan Cup; Super Formula; Porsche Carrera Cup Japan; F3 Asian Championship; Japanese Formula 3 F4 Japanese Championship; FIA European F3; Formula Renault 2.0 NEC; Italian F4 Championship; Eurocup Formula Renault 2.0; Formula Renault 2.0 Alps

Championship titles
- 2019 2019 2019: Porsche Carrera Cup Japan; FIA Motorsport Games GT Cup; F3 Asian Championship
Medal record
GT3
Representing Japan
FIA Motorsport Games
Gold medal – first place	2019 Rome	GT Cup

Ukyō Sasahara (笹原 右京, Sasahara Ukyō; born 24 April 1996) is a Japanese racing driver for Toyota Gazoo Racing who is currently competing in Super GT and Super Formula for TOM'S. He was previously a factory driver for Honda, and has achieved successes in a wide variety of motorsport disciplines.

== Career ==
=== Karting ===
Sasahara began karting aged seven in 2003. He won numerous domestic titles, including becoming JAF All Japan Championship Junior Champion in 2009. In the same year, he beat Matt Parry to win the Rotax Max Challenge Junior Grand Final, a title he went on to win for a second time in 2011. He went on to enjoy further success in the category, winning the Rotax Max Euro Challenge Junior title in 2011, and the Central Eastern European Rotax Max Challenge Senior title in 2012, his final year in karting.

=== European racing career ===
Sasahara graduated to single-seaters in 2013, racing in the Formula Renault 2.0 Alps championship for Vincenzo Sospiri's Euronova Racing team. He finished in the points on seven occasions, taking a best race result of sixth at Misano to finish 13th in the championship. During the season, he also took part in the Spa-Francorchamps and Barcelona rounds of the Eurocup Formula Renault 2.0 season with Euronova Racing as a guest driver.

For 2014, Sasahara continued with Euronova Racing, switching to the Formula Renault 2.0 NEC championship. He took a single podium position, finishing second to Louis Delétraz in the opening race of the season at Monza, and finished in the points in all the remaining races except one to finish sixth in the championship.

In June 2014, Sasahara took part in the opening round of the Italian F4 Championship at Adria International Raceway for Euronova Racing, replacing Italian driver Andrea Fontana who missed the event due to illness. After finishing fifth in the opening race, he won the reversed-grid second race ahead of the Prema Powerteam entry of eventual series champion Lance Stroll.

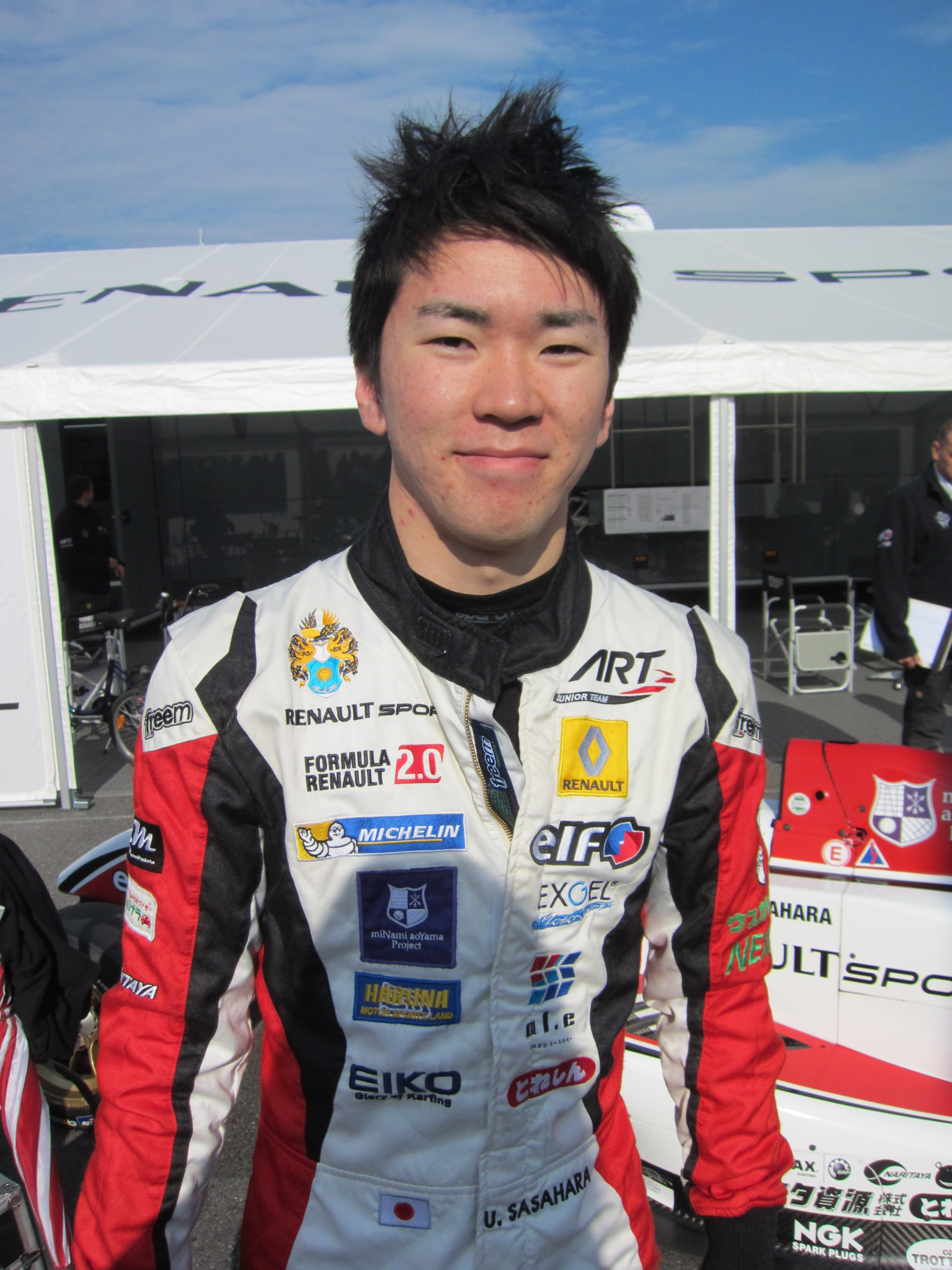
Sasahara during 2015's ADAC GT Masters race weekend at Hockenheim

In 2015, Sasahara joined the ART Junior Team to contest both the Eurocup Formula Renault 2.0 and Formula Renault 2.0 NEC championships. After failing to score points in the opening round of the Eurocup at Motorland Aragón, Sasahara took his first race victory in the following round at Spa-Francorchamps, becoming only the second Japanese driver to win a Eurocup race after Kamui Kobayashi in the 2005 season.

In the NEC championship, Sasahara won the opening race of the season at Monza ahead of Manor MP Motorsport's Ignazio D'Agosto.

In 2016, initially Sasahara did not have a full time seat. He competed for two rounds at Spa-Francorchamps & Imola with Threebond T-Sport.

=== Japanese F4 and Japanese F3 ===
Sasahara returned to Japan, where he competed in F4 Japanese Championship in 2017 with Honda backing. He competed with Honda Formula Dream Project, alongside Yuki Tsunoda & Toshiki Oyu as his teammates. He managed to get runners up place beating his teammates, but lost out to the eventual champion Ritomo Miyata. Sasahara made his step up to the Japanese Formula 3 Championship with ThreeBond Racing. He only managed to claim third in the championship standings, with couple of podiums to his name. He lost out to the TOM'S pairing of Sho Tsuboi who was the champion, and the runners up Ritomo Miyata.

=== F3 Asia and Porsche Carera Cup Japan ===
Unfortunately for Sasahara, he was dropped by Honda for the 2019 season with no drive in Japanese F3 or even Super GT. With that, Sasahara competed in Porsche Carrera Cup Japan. He also competed in the F3 Asian Championship with Hitech Grand Prix that season. Sasahara eventually won both of the series. He made a return in the 2019–20 F3 Asian Championship as a guest with the same team.

=== Super GT ===
Sasahara made his debut in Super GT GT500 for Honda's Team Mugen, partnered alongside Hideki Mutoh. Sasahara took his maiden podium at Motegi. Sasahara continues to compete at Super GT, Team Mugen retained him, with new teammate Toshiki Oyu. Both pairs claimed their maiden pole in GT500 at Sportsland SUGO.

For 2023, Sasahara left Honda, and moved to Toyota. Sasahara competed with Deloitte Team TOM'S, alongside Giuliano Alesi.

=== Super Formula ===
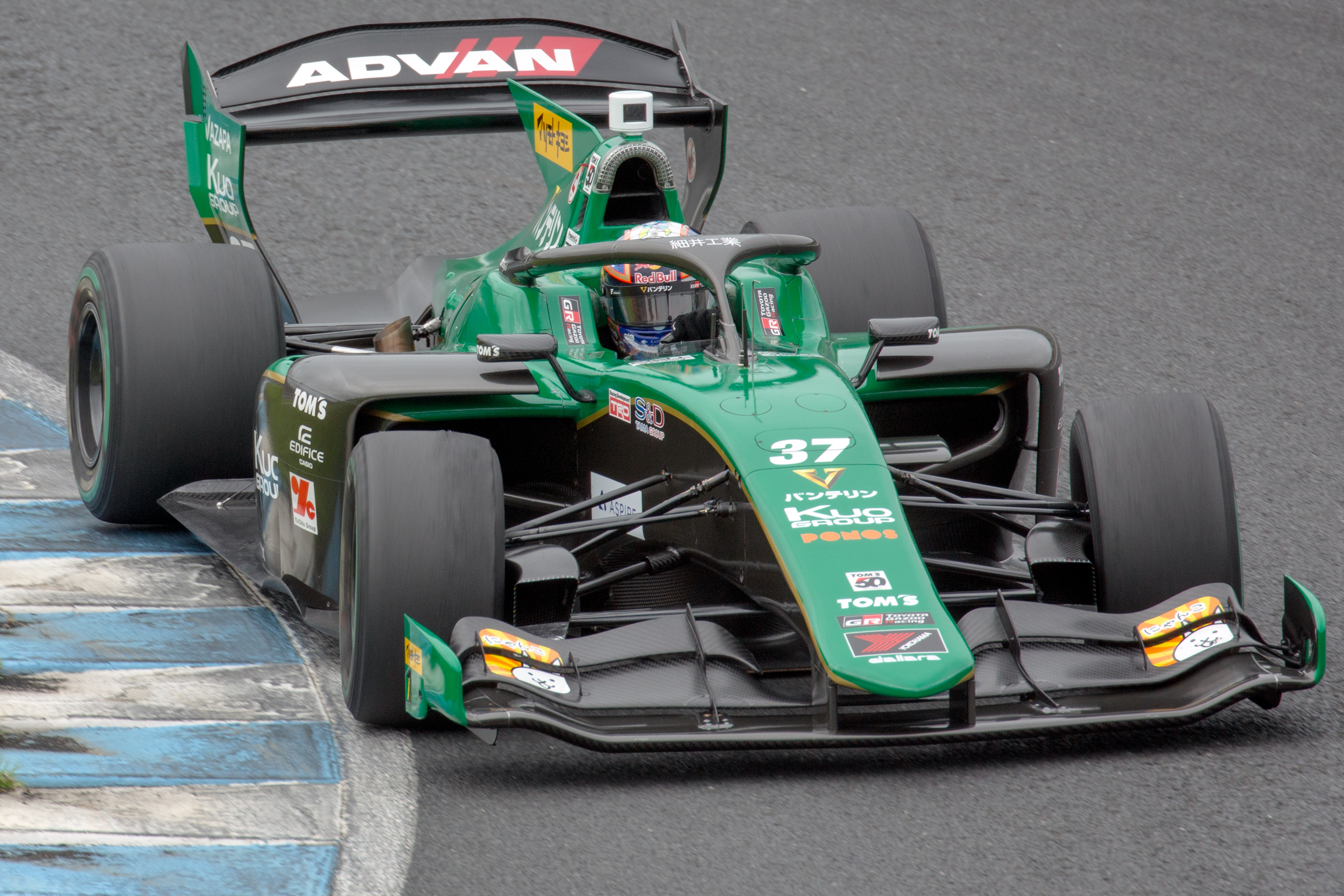
Sasahara driving the Dallara SF23 in 2024 at Mobility Resort Motegi.

Sasahara made his Super Formula debut with Team Mugen, replacing Jüri Vips where initially to compete in this series, but due to COVID-19 border restriction in Japan prevented Vips to entering Japan, and compete for the entire season. Sasahara was originally not scheduled to compete in Super Formula for 2021, but he competed for the first two rounds as he replaced Tadasuke Makino at Dandelion Racing after Makino suffered meningitis. Sasahara claimed his maiden podium in the series on the second round. Sasahara returned to Team Mugen for 2022 season of Super Formula with Team Mugen. Sasahara made his maiden win in Super Formula, as he won at Fuji, and finished sixth in the standings.

Sasahara competed in Super Formula as well, after replaces his Super GT Teammate Alesi in the Vantelin Team TOM'S for the last four rounds.

== Karting record ==
=== Karting career summary ===
Season	Series	Team	Position
2009	Rotax Max Challenge Grand Finals - Junior Max	Team Global	1st
2010	Rotax Max Euro Trophy - Junior Max		6th
2010	Rotax Max Wintercup - Junior Max	Intrepid Force Rotax	1st
2011	Kartmasters British GP - Rotax Junior		18th
2011	Rotax Max Euro Trophy - Junior Max	Paul Carr Racing	1st
2011	Rotax Max Challenge Grand Finals - Junior Max	Paul Carr Racing	1st
2012	Rotax Euro Challenge - Rotax Senior		9th
2012	Rotax International Open - Senior		10th
2012	Rotax Max Challenge Grand Finals - Senior Max		9th
2012	Rotax Max Challenge Central-Eastern Europe - Senior		1st

== Racing record ==
=== Racing career summary ===
Season	Series	Team	Races	Wins	Poles	F/Laps	Podiums	Points	Position
2013	Formula Renault 2.0 Alps	Euronova Racing	14	0	0	0	0	32	13th
2013	Eurocup Formula Renault 2.0	Euronova Racing	4	0	0	0	0	0	NC†
2014	Formula Renault 2.0 NEC	Euronova Racing	15	0	0	1	1	191	6th
2014	Italian F4 Championship	Euronova Racing by Fortec	3	1	0	0	1	25	17th
2015	Eurocup Formula Renault 2.0	ART Junior Team	17	1	1	0	4	116	7th
2015	Formula Renault 2.0 NEC	ART Junior Team	16	2	1	1	8	296	**3rd**
2016	FIA Formula 3 European Championship	Threebond with T-Sport	6	0	0	0	0	0	26th
2017	F4 Japanese Championship	Honda Formula Dream Project	14	3	1	3	10	224	**2nd**
2018	Japanese Formula 3 Championship	ThreeBond Racing	19	0	0	1	9	65	**3rd**
2018	Macau Grand Prix	ThreeBond Racing	1	0	0	0	0	N/A	DNF
2019	F3 Asian Championship	Hitech Grand Prix	15	8	7	7	13	301	**1st**
2019	Japanese Formula 3 Championship	B-Max Racing with Motopark	3	0	0	0	0	3	12th
2019	FIA Motorsport Games GT Cup	Team Japan	1	1	0	0	1	N/A	**1st**
2019	Porsche Carrera Cup Japan	Porsche Japan	10	6	6	4	9	176	**1st**
2019–20	F3 Asian Championship	Hitech Grand Prix	15	3	4	1	6	N/A	NC†
2020	Super GT - GT500	Team Mugen	8	0	0	0	1	25	15th
2020	Super Formula	Team Mugen	7	0	0	0	0	5	18th
2021	Super GT - GT500	Team Red Bull Mugen	8	0	1	0	0	20	16th
2021	Super Formula	Docomo Team Dandelion Racing	2	0	0	0	1	18	12th
2022	Super Formula	Team Mugen	10	2	1	0	2	57	6th
2022	Super GT - GT500	Team Red Bull Mugen	8	0	0	0	1	16.5	14th
2023	Super GT - GT500	TGR Team Deloitte TOM'S	8	0	0	0	0	15	15th
2023	Super Formula	Vantelin Team TOM’S	3	0	0	0	0	0	22nd
2024	Super GT - GT500	TGR Team Deloitte TOM'S	8	2	1	0	2	51	5th
2024	Super Formula	Vantelin Team TOM’S	9	0	0	0	0	0	20th
2024	SRO Japan Cup - GT3	Bingo Racing	2	2	2	?	2	50	9th
2025	Super GT - GT500	TGR Team Deloitte TOM'S	8	1	0	0	2	49.5	6th
2025	SRO Japan Cup - GT3	Bingo Racing with LM corsa	8	2	3	0	4	97	4th
2025	Super Taikyu - ST-USA-1	Bingo Racing							
2026	Super GT - GT500	TGR Team Deloitte TOM'S	8	0	0	0	1	28	12th
2026	Super Formula	Realize Kondo Racing	10	0	0	0	0	0	26th*
2026	SRO Japan Cup - GT3	Bingo Racing with LM corsa	8	1	1	0	3	110	4th

^{†} As Sasahara was a guest driver, he was ineligible for championship points.
^{*} Season still in progress.

=== Complete Formula Renault 2.0 Alps Series results ===
(key) (Races in bold indicate pole position) (Races in italics indicate fastest lap)

Year	Team	1	2	3	4	5	6	7	8	9	10	11	12	13	14	Pos	Points
2013	Euronova Racing	VLL; 1; 8	VLL; 2; 8	IMO1; 1; 21	IMO1; 2; 18	SPA; 1; 7	SPA; 2; 16	MNZ; 1; 15	MNZ; 2; 15	MIS; 1; 8	MIS; 2; 6	MUG; 1; 9	MUG; 2; 8	IMO2; 1; 23	IMO2; 2; 21	13th	32

=== Complete Eurocup Formula Renault 2.0 results ===
(key) (Races in bold indicate pole position) (Races in italics indicate fastest lap)

Year	Entrant	1	2	3	4	5	6	7	8	9	10	11	12	13	14	15	16	17	DC	Points
2013	Euronova Racing	ALC; 1	ALC; 2	SPA; 1; 21	SPA; 2; 16	MSC; 1	MSC; 2	RBR; 1	RBR; 2	HUN; 1	HUN; 2	LEC; 1	LEC; 2	CAT; 1 Ret	CAT; 2; 10				NC†	0
2015	ART Junior Team	ALC; 1; 11	ALC; 2; 17	ALC; 3 Ret	SPA; 1; 1	**SPA**; **2**; 2	HUN; 1 Ret	HUN; 2; 12	SIL; 1; 12	SIL; 2; 4	SIL; 3; 3	NÜR; 1; 2	NÜR; 2; 8	LMS; 1; 5	LMS; 2; 9	JER; 1; 9	JER; 2; 16	JER; 3; 5	7th	116

† As Sasahara was a guest driver, he was ineligible for points

=== Complete Formula Renault 2.0 Northern European Cup results ===
(key) (Races in bold indicate pole position; races in italics indicate fastest lap)

Year	Entrant	1	2	3	4	5	6	7	8	9	10	11	12	13	14	15	16	17	DC	Points
2014	Euronova Racing	MNZ; 1; 2	MNZ; 2 Ret	SIL; 1; 10	SIL; 2; 7	HOC; 1; 8	HOC; 2; 18	HOC; 3; 5	SPA; 1; 7	SPA; 2; 4	ASS; 1; 9	ASS; 2; 4	MST; 1; 8	MST; 2; 9	MST; 3 C	NÜR; 1; 5	NÜR; 2; 12	NÜR; 3 C	6th	191
2015	ART Junior Team	MNZ; 1; 1	MNZ; 2; 2	SIL; 1; 2	SIL; 2; 4	RBR; 1; 10	RBR; 2; 18	RBR; 3; 6	SPA; 1; 5	SPA; 2; 5	ASS; 1; 2	ASS; 2; 3	**NÜR**; **1**; 1	NÜR; 2; 8	HOC; 1; 2	HOC; 2; 4	HOC; 3; 3		3rd	296

=== Complete Italian F4 Championship results ===
(key) (Races in bold indicate pole position; races in italics indicate fastest lap)

Year	Team	1	2	3	4	5	6	7	8	9	10	11	12	13	14	15	16	17	18	19	20	21	DC	Points
2014	Euronova Racing by Fortec	ADR; 1; 5	ADR; 2; 1	ADR; 3 Ret	IMO1; 1	IMO1; 2	IMO1; 3	MUG; 1	MUG; 2	MUG; 3	MAG; 1	MAG; 2	MAG; 3	VLL; 1	VLL; 2	VLL; 3	MNZ; 1	MNZ; 2	MNZ; 3	IMO2; 1	IMO2; 2	IMO2; 3	17th	25

=== Complete FIA Formula 3 European Championship results ===
(key) (Races in bold indicate pole position) (Races in italics indicate fastest lap)

Year	Entrant	Engine	1	2	3	4	5	6	7	8	9	10	11	12	13	14	15	16	17	18	19	20	21	22	23	24	25	26	27	28	29	30	DC	Points
2016	Threebond with T-Sport	Threebond	LEC; 1	LEC; 2	LEC; 3	HUN; 1	HUN; 2	HUN; 3	PAU; 1	PAU; 2	PAU; 3	RBR; 1	RBR; 2	RBR; 3	NOR; 1	NOR; 2	NOR; 3	ZAN; 1	ZAN; 2	ZAN; 3	SPA; 1; 13	SPA; 2 Ret	SPA; 3; 19	NÜR; 1	NÜR; 2	NÜR; 3	IMO; 1 Ret	IMO; 2; 13	IMO; 3 Ret	HOC; 1	HOC; 2	HOC; 3	26th	0

=== Complete F4 Japanese Championship results ===
(key) (Races in bold indicate pole position; races in italics indicate fastest lap)

Year	Team	1	2	3	4	5	6	7	8	9	10	11	12	13	14	DC	Points
2017	Honda Formula Dream Project	OKA; 1; 1	OKA; 2; 2	FUJ1; 1; 3	FUJ1; 2; 3	**AUT**; **1**; 1	AUT; 2; 3	SUG; 1; 1	SUG; 2 Ret	FUJ2; 1; 2	FUJ2; 2; 2	SUZ; 1; 4	SUZ; 2; 2	MOT; 1; 5	MOT; 2; 5	2nd	224

=== Complete Japanese Formula 3 Championship results ===
(key) (Races in bold indicate pole position; races in italics indicate fastest lap)

Year	Team	Engine	1	2	3	4	5	6	7	8	9	10	11	12	13	14	15	16	17	18	19	20	21	DC	Pts
2018	ThreeBond Racing	Tomei	SUZ; 1; 4	SUZ; 2; 7	SUG; 1; 5	SUG; 2; 5	FUJ; 1; 3	FUJ; 2; 3	OKA; 1; 3	OKA; 2; 7	OKA; 3 C	MOT; 1 Ret	MOT; 2; 4	MOT; 3; 7	OKA; 1; 4	OKA; 2; 2	OKA; 3 C	SUG; 1; 3	SUG; 2; 3	SUG; 3; 2	SUG; 4; 3	FUJ; 1 Ret	FUJ; 2; 2	3rd	65
2019	B-Max Racing with Motopark	Volkswagen	SUZ; 1	SUZ; 2	AUT; 1	AUT; 2	AUT; 3	OKA; 1	OKA; 2	OKA; 3	SUG; 1	SUG; 2	FUJ; 1	FUJ; 2	SUG; 1	SUG; 2	SUG; 3	MOT; 1; 5	MOT; 2; 9	MOT; 3; 6	OKA; 1	OKA; 2		12th	3

=== Complete Macau Grand Prix results ===
Year	Team	Car	Qualifying	Quali Race	Main race
2018	(Japan) ThreeBond Racing	Dallara F317	24th	22nd	DNF

=== Complete F3 Asian Championship results ===
(key) (Races in bold indicate pole position) (Races in italics indicate fastest lap)

Year	Team	1	2	3	4	5	6	7	8	9	10	11	12	13	14	15	DC	Points
2019	Hitech Grand Prix	SEP; 1; 1	SEP; 2; 1	SEP; 3; 2	**CHA**; **1**; 1	CHA; 2; 2	**CHA**; **3**; 1	**SUZ**; **1**; 2	SUZ; 2; 1	SUZ; 3; 9	**SIC1**; **1**; 1	SIC1; 2; 1	**SIC1**; **3**; 1	**SIC2**; **1**; 3	SIC2; 2; 4	**SIC2**; **3**; 2	1st	301
2019–20	Abu Dhabi Racing UAE	SEP; 1; 8	SEP; 2; 15†	SEP; 3; 15†	**DUB**; **1**; 16†	DUB; 2 Ret	**DUB**; **3**; 2	**ABU**; **1**; 1	ABU; 2; 2	ABU; 3; 4	SEP; 1; 9†	SEP; 2; 3	SEP; 3; 12†	CHA; 1; 13	CHA; 2; 1	**CHA**; **3**; 1	NC†	0

† As Sasahara was a guest driver, he was ineligible to score points

=== Complete Super GT results ===
(key) (Races in bold indicate pole position) (Races in italics indicate fastest lap)

Year	Team	Car	Class	1	2	3	4	5	6	7	8	9	DC	Points
2020	Team Mugen	Honda NSX-GT	GT500	FUJ; 12	FUJ; 10	SUZ; Ret	MOT; 3	FUJ; 6	SUZ; 13	MOT; 4	FUJ; 12		15th	25
2021	Team Red Bull Mugen	Honda NSX-GT	GT500	OKA; 11	FUJ; 11	MOT; 4	SUZ; 9	SUG; 9	**AUT**; Ret	MOT; 5	FUJ; 10		16th	20
2022	Team Red Bull Mugen	Honda NSX-GT	GT500	OKA; 12	FUJ; 10‡	SUZ; 13	FUJ; 13	SUZ; 6	SUG; 3	AUT; 12	MOT; 11		14th	16.5
2023	TGR Team Deloitte TOM'S	Toyota GR Supra GT500	GT500	OKA; 13	FUJ; 6	SUZ; 11	FUJ; 8	SUZ; 11	SUG; 10	AUT; 7	MOT; 9		15th	15
2024	TGR Team Deloitte TOM'S	Toyota GR Supra GT500	GT500	OKA; 7	FUJ; 11	**SUZ**; 1	FUJ; 10	SUG; 1	AUT; 8	MOT; Ret	SUZ; 11		5th	51
2025	TGR Team Deloitte TOM'S	Toyota GR Supra GT500	GT500	OKA; 5	FUJ; 7	SEP; 1	FS1; 3	FS2 (7)	SUZ; 12	SUG; 5	AUT; Ret	MOT; 5	6th	49.5
2026	TGR Team Deloitte TOM'S	Toyota GR Supra GT500	GT500	OKA; 14	FUJ; Ret	FUJ; 3	SUZ; 10	SUG; 5	AUT; 4	MOT; Ret	MOT; 9		12th	28

^{‡} Half points awarded as less than 75% of race distance was completed.
^{(Number)} Driver did not take part in this sprint race, points are still awarded for the teammate's result.

=== Complete Super Formula results ===
(key) (Races in bold indicate pole position) (Races in italics indicate fastest lap)

Year	Team	Engine	1	2	3	4	5	6	7	8	9	10	11	12	DC	Points
2020	Team Mugen	Honda	MOT; 11	OKA; 13	SUG; Ret	AUT; 14	SUZ; Ret	SUZ; 11^{3}	FUJ; 7						18th	5
2021	Docomo Team Dandelion Racing	Honda	FUJ; 5^{3}	SUZ; 3	AUT	SUG	MOT	MOT	SUZ						12th	18
2022	Team Mugen	Honda	**FUJ**; 19^{1}	FUJ; 10^{3}	SUZ; 14	AUT; 7	SUG; 10	FUJ; 1	MOT; 7	MOT; 8	SUZ; 1	SUZ; 17			6th	57
2023	Vantelin Team TOM’S	Toyota	FUJ	FUJ	SUZ	AUT	SUG	FUJ; 19	MOT; 12	SUZ; 22	SUZ; WD				22nd	0
2024	Vantelin Team TOM’S	Toyota	SUZ; 15	AUT; 12	SUG; 16	FUJ; 12	MOT; 16	FUJ; 12	FUJ; 14	SUZ; 15†	SUZ; 14				20th	0
2026	Realize Kondo Racing	Toyota	MOT; Ret	MOT; 21	SUZ; Ret	SUZ; Ret	FUJ; 20	FUJ; 20	FUJ; 21	SUG; Ret	FUJ; 20	FUJ; Ret	SUZ	SUZ	26th*	0*

^{†} Driver did not finish the race, but was classified as he completed over 90% of the race distance. ^{*} Season still in progress.

Sporting positions
Preceded by Raoul Hyman	F3 Asian Championship; Champion; 2019	Succeeded by Joey Alders
Preceded by Inaugural	FIA Motorsport Games; GT Cup Winner; 2019; With: Hiroshi Hamaguchi	Succeeded by Simon Gachet; Eric Debard
