= GT World Challenge Europe Endurance Cup =

Sports car racing championship in Europe

- Category: Grand tourer Endurance racing
- Country: Europe
- Inaugural season: 2011
- Tyre suppliers: Michelin (2011–2012); Pirelli (2013–present)
- Drivers' champion: (Germany) Sven Müller (Switzerland) Patric Niederhauser (Belgium) Alessio Picariello
- Teams' champion: (Germany) Rutronik Racing
- Official website: gt-world-challenge-europe.com

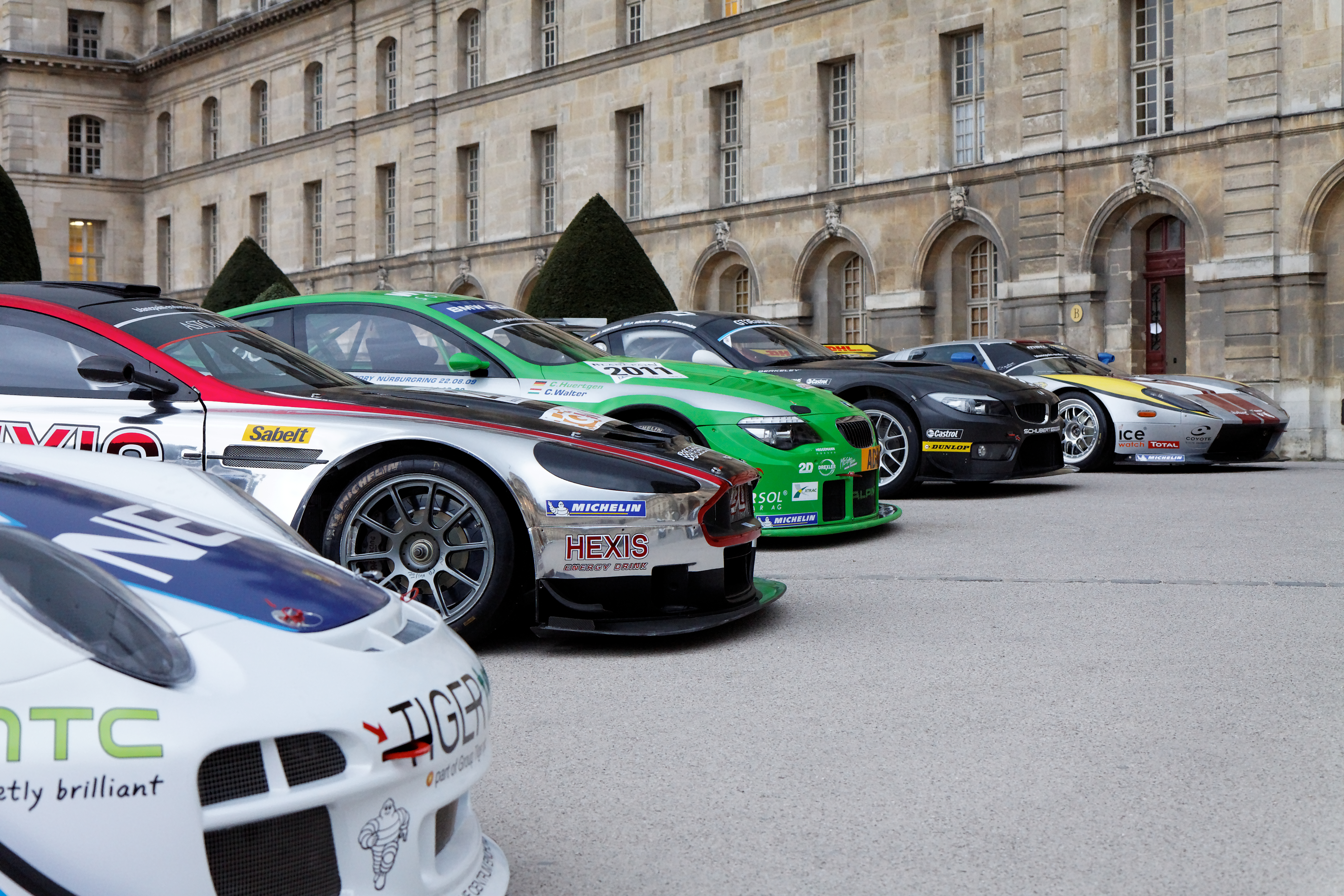
Presentation of the inaugural 2011 Blancpain Endurance Series season

The GT World Challenge Europe Endurance Cup, formerly for sponsorship reasons the Blancpain Endurance Series from 2011 to 2015 and Blancpain GT Series Endurance Cup from 2016 to 2019, is a sports car racing series developed by SRO Motorsports Group and the Royal Automobile Club of Belgium (RACB) with approval from the Fédération Internationale de l'Automobile (FIA). It features grand tourer racing cars modified from production road cars complying with the FIA's GT3 regulations. The series's goal is to be an endurance racing championship for GT3 cars, similar to the FIA World Endurance Championship which were using GTE cars and Le Mans Prototypes (now GT3 and Le Mans Hypercars). The series was primarily sponsored by Swiss watchmaker Blancpain, and the company's Lamborghini Super Trofeo series serve as support races. In 2019, SRO announced that their sponsorship deal with Blancpain had been discontinued and the series was renamed the GT World Challenge Europe Endurance Cup for the 2020 season.

== Format ==
The GT World Challenge Europe Endurance Cup reestablishes several elements of the former FIA GT Championship, with three hour endurance races held on European circuits such as Monza and Silverstone, as well as a continuation of the Spa 24 Hours. The races feature five classes derived from the FIA's GT3, GT4, and Supersport regulations, with the GT3 cars divided into a class for professional driver line-ups (GT3 Pro), a class for a mixed team of professional and amateurs (GT3 Pro-Am), and a class for gentleman drivers who use cars at least one year old (GT3 Am). The FIA's ranking system for drivers is utilized in determining what class each entry is eligible for. The GT4 category remained its own class.

For the 2012 season, the GT4 and Supersport category were dropped and the GT3 Citation class was modified into the Gentlemen class. In 2013, grids have reached 60 cars for regular races.

The series uses extensive performance balancing and handicap weights to equalise the cars' performance.

== Champions ==
=== Drivers ===
Year	Pro Cup (2011–2015) Overall (2016–present)	Silver Cup	Gold Cup	Pro-Am Cup	Gentlemen Trophy (2011–2014) Am Cup (2015–2020)	GT4
2011	(Belgium) Greg Franchi	—N/a	—N/a	(Netherlands) Niek Hommerson (Belgium) Louis Machiels	(France) Georges Cabannes	(United Kingdom) Alex Buncombe (France) Jordan Tresson (United Kingdom) Christopher Ward
2012	(Germany) Christopher Haase (Germany) Christopher Mies (Monaco) Stéphane Ortelli	—N/a	—N/a	(Netherlands) Niek Hommerson (Belgium) Louis Machiels	(Switzerland) Pierre Hirschi (United Kingdom) Robert Hissom	—N/a
2013	(Germany) Maximilian Buhk	—N/a	—N/a	(Spain) Lucas Ordóñez	(France) Jean-Luc Beaubelique (France) Jean-Luc Blanchemain (France) Patrice Goueslard	—N/a
2014	(Belgium) Laurens Vanthoor	—N/a	—N/a	(Italy) Stefano Gai (Italy) Andrea Rizzoli	(Portugal) Francisco Guedes (United Kingdom) Peter Mann	—N/a
2015	(United Kingdom) Alex Buncombe (Japan) Katsumasa Chiyo (Belgium) Wolfgang Reip	—N/a	—N/a	(United Kingdom) Duncan Cameron (Republic of Ireland) Matt Griffin	(United Kingdom) Ian Loggie (United Kingdom) Julian Westwood	—N/a
2016	(United Kingdom) Rob Bell (France) Côme Ledogar (New Zealand) Shane van Gisbergen	—N/a	—N/a	(Italy) Alessandro Bonacini (Poland) Michał Broniszewski (Italy) Andrea Rizzoli	(Russia) Vadim Gitlin (Australia) Liam Talbot (Italy) Marco Zanuttini	—N/a
2017	(Italy) Mirko Bortolotti (Italy) Andrea Caldarelli (Germany) Christian Engelhart	—N/a	—N/a	(United Kingdom) Jonathan Adam (Oman) Ahmad Al Harthy	(Belgium) Jacques Duyver (South Africa) David Perel (Italy) Marco Zanuttini	—N/a
2018	(Netherlands) Yelmer Buurman (Germany) Maro Engel (Germany) Luca Stolz	(Switzerland) Alex Fontana (Canada) Mikaël Grenier (Switzerland) Adrian Zaugg	—N/a	(United Kingdom) Chris Buncombe (United Kingdom) Nick Leventis (United Kingdom) Lewis Williamson	(Switzerland) Adrian Amstutz (Russia) Leo Machitski	—N/a
2019	(Italy) Andrea Caldarelli (2) (Italy) Marco Mapelli (2)	(Germany) Nico Bastian (Russia) Timur Boguslavskiy (Brazil) Felipe Fraga	—N/a	(Oman) Ahmad Al Harthy (Republic of Ireland) Charlie Eastwood (Turkey) Salih Yoluç	(Switzerland) Adrian Amstutz (Russia) Leo Machitski	—N/a
2020	(Italy) Alessandro Pier Guidi	(Finland) Patrick Kujala (United Kingdom) Alex MacDowall (Denmark) Frederik Schandorff	—N/a	(United Kingdom) Chris Goodwin (Sweden) Alexander West	(France) Stéphane Tribaudini	—N/a
2021	(Italy) Alessandro Pier Guidi (2) (Denmark) Nicklas Nielsen (France) Côme Ledogar (2)	(Switzerland) Alex Fontana (Switzerland) Ricardo Feller (Switzerland) Rolf Ineichen	—N/a	(United Kingdom) Chris Froggatt (Hong Kong) Jonathan Hui	—N/a	—N/a
2022	(France) Jules Gounon (Spain) Daniel Juncadella (Switzerland) Raffaele Marciello	(Denmark) Benjamin Goethe (France) Thomas Neubauer (France) Jean-Baptiste Simmenauer	(United Kingdom) Ollie Millroy (Denmark) Frederik Schandorff (United States) Brendan Iribe	(Belgium) Louis Machiels (Italy) Andrea Bertolini (Italy) Stefano Costantini	—N/a	—N/a
Year	Pro Cup (2011–2015) Overall (2016–present)	Gold Cup	Silver Cup	Bronze Cup	Pro-Am Cup	—N/a
2023	(Andorra) Jules Gounon (2); Timur Boguslavskiy (Switzerland) Raffaele Marciello (2)	(Belgium) Nicolas Baert (Belgium) Maxime Soulet	(Chile) Benjamín Hites (Austria) Clemens Schmid (Netherlands) Glenn van Berlo	(Italy) Eddie Cheever III (United Kingdom) Chris Froggatt (Hong Kong) Jonathan Hui	(Switzerland) Alex Fontana (Switzerland) Ivan Jacoma (Switzerland) Nicolas Leutwiler	—N/a
2024	(Italy) Alessandro Pier Guidi (3) (Italy) Alessio Rovera	(France) Paul Evrard (Belgium) Gilles Magnus (France) Jim Pla	(Netherlands) "Daan Arrow" (Netherlands) Colin Caresani (Thailand) Tanart Sathienthirakul	(Italy) Eddie Cheever III (United Kingdom) Chris Froggatt (Hong Kong) Jonathan Hui	—N/a	—N/a
2025	(Belgium) Alessio Picariello (Germany) Sven Müller (Switzerland) Patric Niederhauser	(Netherlands) Thierry Vermeulen (United Kingdom) Chris Lulham (United Kingdom) Harry King	(South Africa) Jarrod Waberski (United Kingdom) William Moore (Netherlands) Mex Jansen	(Denmark) Conrad Laursen (Germany) Dennis Marschall (United States) Dustin Blattner	—N/a	—N/a
2026	(Austria) Lucas Auer (Germany) Maro Engel (2) (Germany) Luca Stolz (2)	(Belgium) Ugo de Wilde (Germany) Jens Klingmann (Germany) Tim Tramnitz	(Belgium) Amaury Cordeel (Belgium) Matisse Lismont (Argentina) Ignacio Montenegro	(United States) Dustin Blattner	—N/a	—N/a

=== Teams ===
Year	Pro Cup (2011–2015) Overall (2016–present)	Silver Cup	Gold Cup	Pro-Am Cup	Gentlemen Trophy (2011–2014) Am Cup (2015–2020)	GT4
2011	(Belgium) WRT Belgian Audi Club	—N/a	—N/a	(Germany) Vita4One	(France) Ruffier Racing	(United Kingdom) RJN Motorsport
2012	(Belgium) Belgian Audi Club Team WRT (2)	—N/a	—N/a	(Italy) AF Corse	(France) Saintéloc Racing	—N/a
2013	(Belgium) Marc VDS Racing Team	—N/a	—N/a	(United Kingdom) Nissan GT Academy Team RJN	(France) SOFREV Auto Sport Promotion	—N/a
2014	(Belgium) Belgian Audi Club Team WRT (3)	—N/a	—N/a	(Italy) Scuderia Villorba Corse	(Italy) AF Corse	—N/a
2015	(Belgium) Belgian Audi Club Team WRT (4)	—N/a	—N/a	(Italy) AF Corse	(France) AKKA ASP	—N/a
2016	(United Kingdom) Garage 59	—N/a	—N/a	(Switzerland) Kessel Racing	(Switzerland) Kessel Racing	—N/a
2017	(United Kingdom) Bentley Team M-Sport	—N/a	—N/a	Oman Racing Team with TF Sport	(Switzerland) Kessel Racing	—N/a
2018	(Germany) Mercedes-AMG Team Black Falcon	Not awarded	—N/a	(Italy) AF Corse	(United Kingdom) Barwell Motorsport	—N/a
2019	(China) Orange1 FFF Racing Team	(France) AKKA ASP Team	—N/a	Oman Racing with TF Sport	(United Kingdom) Barwell Motorsport	—N/a
2020	(Italy) AF Corse	(United Kingdom) Barwell Motorsport	—N/a	(United Kingdom) Garage 59	(France) CMR	—N/a
2021	(Belgium) Belgian Audi Club Team WRT (5)	(Switzerland) Emil Frey Racing	—N/a	(United Kingdom) Sky - Tempesta Racing	—N/a	—N/a
2022	(France) AKKodis ASP Team	(Belgium) Team WRT	(United Kingdom) Inception Racing	(Germany) SPS Automotive Performance	—N/a	—N/a
Year	Pro Cup (2011–2015) Overall (2016–present)	Gold Cup	Silver Cup	Bronze Cup	Pro-Am Cup	—N/a
2023	(France) AKKodis ASP Team (2)	(Belgium) Comtoyou Racing	(Austria) GRT Grasser Racing Team	(United Kingdom) Sky – Tempesta Racing	(Germany) Car Collection Motorsport	—N/a
2024	(Italy) AF Corse - Francorchamps Motors (2)	(France) Saintéloc Racing	(United States) Winward Racing	(United Kingdom) Sky – Tempesta Racing	—N/a	—N/a
2025	(Germany) Rutronik Racing	(Netherlands) Verstappen.com Racing	(United Kingdom) Century Motorsport	(Switzerland) Kessel Racing	—N/a	—N/a
2026	(United States) Winward Racing	(Germany) Rowe Racing	(Belgium) Team WRT	(Switzerland) Kessel Racing	—N/a	—N/a

== See also ==
- British GT Championship
- GT World Challenge Europe
- GT World Challenge Europe Sprint Cup
- GT World Challenge Asia
- GT World Challenge Australia
- GT4 European Series
- FIA World Endurance Championship
- European Le Mans Series
- Asian Le Mans Series
- 24 Hours of Spa
