= Grasser Racing Team =

Austrian motorsport team

(Austria) Grasser Racing Team
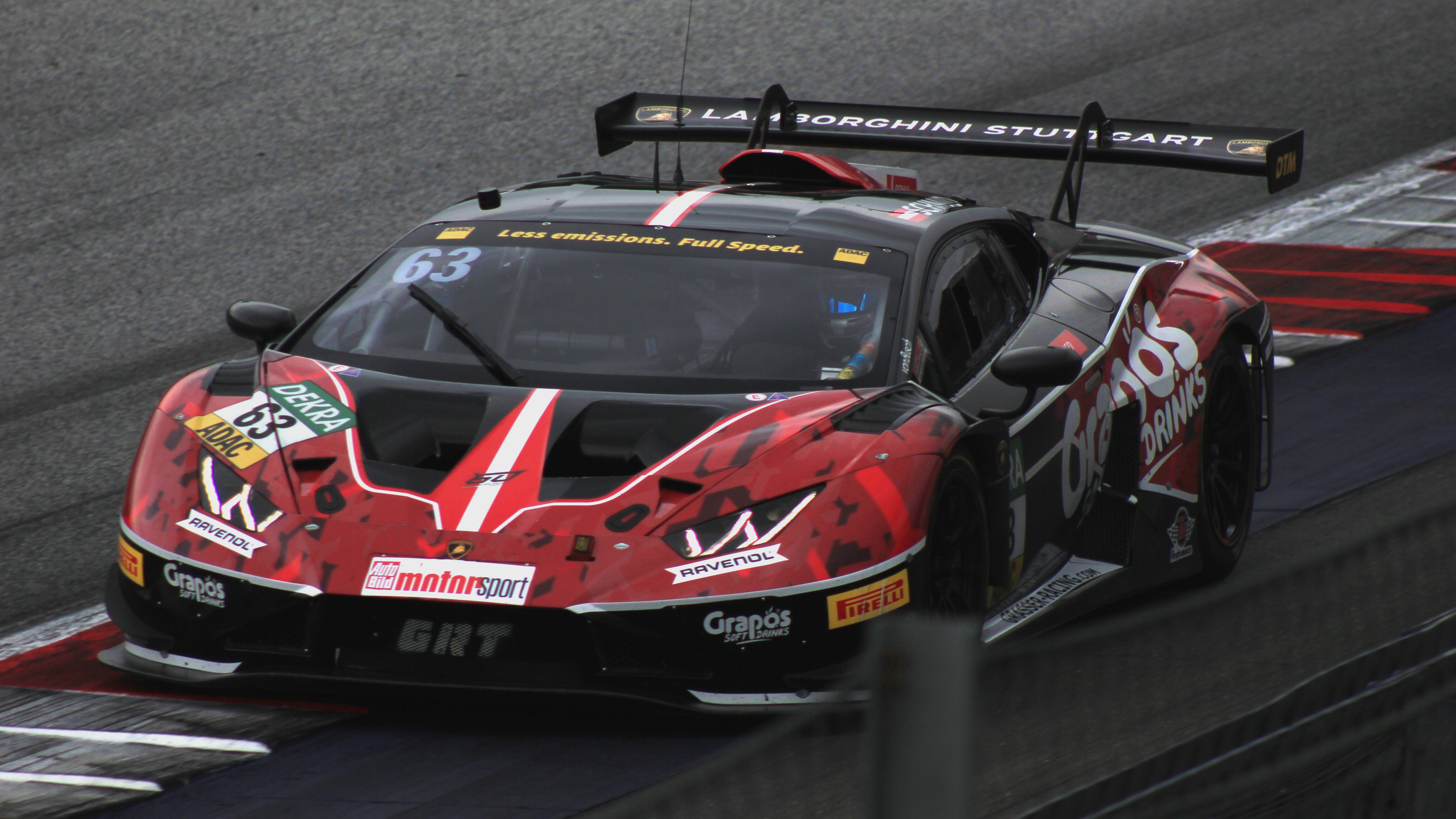
- Founded: 2011
- Base: Sankt Margarethen bei Knittelfeld, Styria
- Team principal(s): Gottfried Grasser
- Current series: Deutsche Tourenwagen Masters; GT World Challenge Europe; ADAC GT Masters
- Former series: DMV GTC; Euro GT Series; IMSA SportsCar Championship; 24H Series
- Current drivers: (Germany) Luca Engstler (Germany) Christian Engelhart (United Kingdom) Hugo Cook (Italy) Mateo Llarena (Kuwait) Haytham Qarajouli (Italy) Marco Mapelli (France) Franck Perera (United States) Taylor Hagler (Germany) Jannik Julius-Bernhart (Chile) Benjamín Hites (Germany) Tim Zimmermann
- Teams' Championships: Blancpain GT Series (2017)
- Drivers' Championships: Blancpain GT Series Endurance Cup (2017); Blancpain GT Series (2017); DTM (2024)
- Website: http://www.grasser-racing.com/

Gottfried Grasser GmbH racing as GRT Grasser Racing Team is an Austrian racing team. The team, based only 10 kilometers away from the Red Bull Ring, has raced in various Group GT3 based racing series with support from Lamborghini since 2015, including DTM, ADAC GT Masters, GT World Challenge Europe or the GTD category of the IMSA SportsCar Championship.

== Gottfried Grasser ==
Team founder Ing. Gottfried Armin Grasser (born 8 December 1978 in Leoben, Styria) started karting in 1997. Grasser raced in Formula König in 1999 and 2000. He finished third in the rookie standings in 1999. In 2001 and 2002 Grasser joined Team Ghinzani in their German F3 campaign. The Austrian also tested their Formula 3000 car, as well as Minardi's car. After taking over his parents Mazda dealership, he retired from single seater racing.

== Grasser-Ultima GTR ==
In 2004, Gottfried Grasser started the development of the Grasser-Ultima GTR. The Ultima GTR was introduced in 1999 by Ultima Sports. The car was raced in various championships such as the 2002 24 Hours of Daytona. After building the kit car, Grasser tested it at the Pannónia-Ring to conclude that the whole car had to be modified to compete in motorsports. With support from tire manufacturer Yokohama. The car was fitted with crashboxes, a flat bottom and diffuser. The car was fitted with a Porsche engine that was redeveloped by Richmond Racing Engines.

After the end of the Euro GT Series after the 2006 season, the team sought another championship to enter the Ultima such as the Spezial Tourenwagen Trophy (STT) and the Divinol Cup. Grasser raced the car for the first time in the STT at the Jim Clark Revival at the Hockenheimring.

== GT3 racing ==
=== Customer Lamborghini entrant ===
Peter Ebner joined Grasser in the 2011 ADAC GT Masters. The team entered a Dodge Viper Competition Coupe in the Nürburgring and Red Bull Ring rounds. After the team failed to start the races at both rounds, the team ended their 2011 season. For 2012, the team bought a Lamborghini Gallardo LP520 from the NK Racing Team which contested the car in the 2011 season. Teamowner Gottfried Grasser was joined by Mario Dablander in the first round and Tomáš Enge in the second round. After two disappointing rounds with only one top-twenty finish, the team switched to the newer Gallardo LP600+ model, developed by Reiter Engineering. Luxembourgian driver Daniel Bohr joined the teamowner/driver at the fourth round of the series at the Nürburgring. The team struggled with their new car in heavy rain. In the first race the duo started 34th and finished in 26th place. For the second race, Bohr spun at the Kurzanbindung section finishing in 35th place. Bohr was replaced by 2012 24 Hours of Spa winner Andrea Piccini for the Red Bull Ring round. After a retirement in the first race, the team finished twentieth in the second race. For the Lausitzring round Piccini was replaced by Carsten Seifert. The team again failed to score points with a retirement and a 24th place. Grasser Racing Team did not start the final two rounds of the championship.

For 2013, Grasser Racing Team expanded their efforts with a full Blancpain Sprint Series campaign and partial Blancpain Endurance Series and ADAC GT Masters campaigns. Hari Proczyk and Dominik Baumann were successful in the Pro-Am category of the Blancpain Sprint Series. After five consecutive third place class finishes, the team won the sixth race in class. The Grasser Racing Team finished fifth overall, taking their first class victory. Proczyk, partnered with Gerhard Tweraser for the Navarra round as Baumann had other obligations in the ADAC GT Masters. Tweraser and Baumann finished third overall, first in class at the Spanish track. Baumann returned for the season finale at Baku. Proczyk was still in the race for the Pro-Am championship. Title competitors Sergey Afanasyev and Andreas Simonsen qualified first in class, while Proczyk and Baumann qualified third on the street circuit. A crash for Proczyk mid-race caused Simonsen and Afanasyev to secure their title. Proczyk and Baumann won the second race in Baku ending their season on a high note. Proczyk finished second in the Pro-Am standings, as Baumann missed two races he finished third.

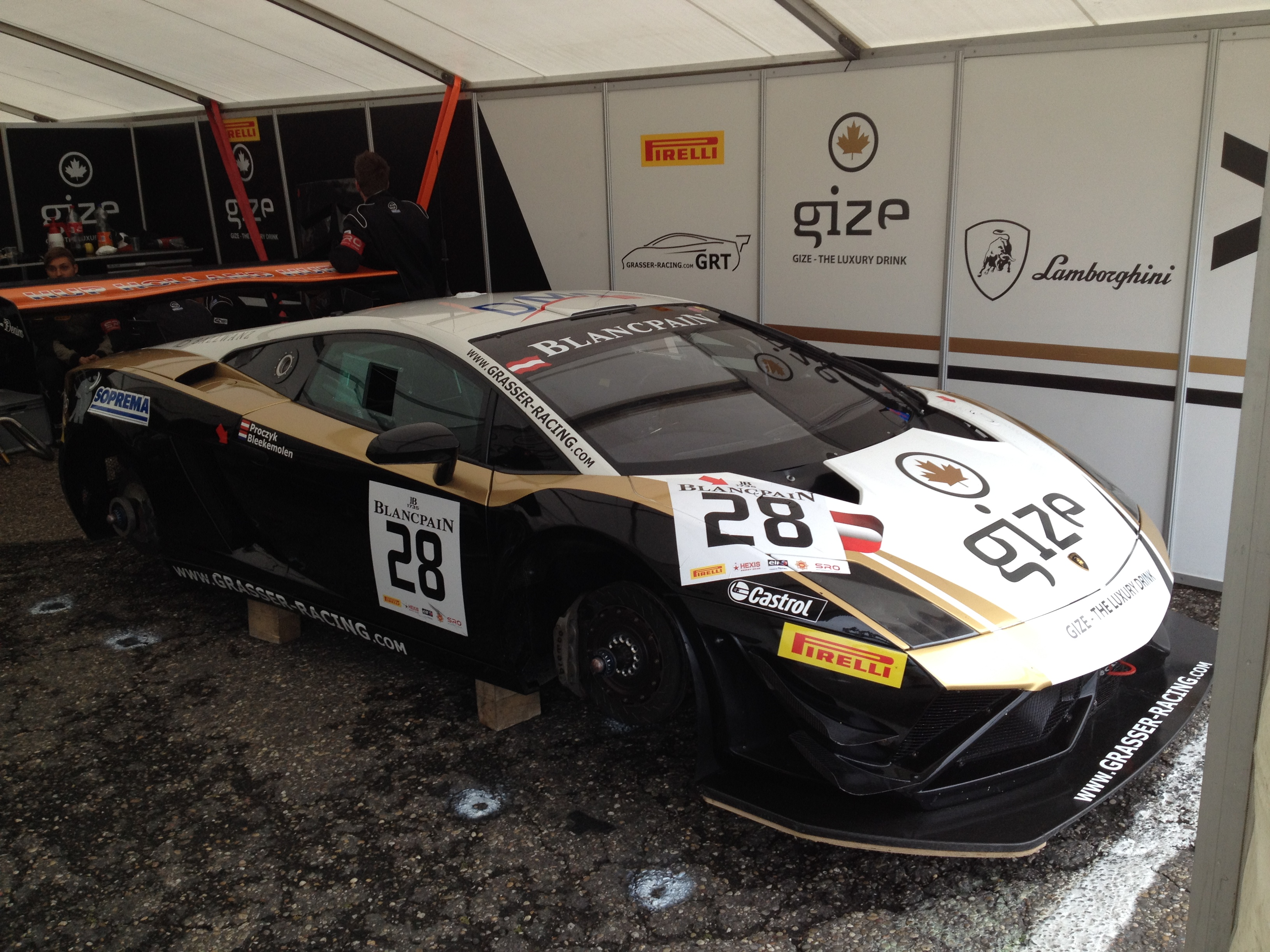
The car raced by Jeroen Bleekemolen and Hari Proczyk in 2014.

The Grasser Racing Team also entered the first three races of the Blancpain Endurance Series. Owner/driver Gottfried Grasser was joined by Proczyk and Tweraser. At the season opener at Monza, the team encountered vibrations caused by a damaged splitter. Due to lengthy vibrations the team chose to retire the car. Finally, the team entered two cars in the Red Bull Ring round of the 2013 ADAC GT Masters. Former F3000 driver Bernhard Auinger made a short comeback into motorsports. Auinger started the car shared with teamowner Grasser. Auinger made contact with a Porsche in the Rauch bend. The duo finished third in the gentleman driver standings. The second car with Proczyk and Tweraser did not finish.

In 2014 the team focused on the Blancpain Sprint Series with a strong line-up. Car 27 was rotated between Enge, Sascha Halek, Stefan Landmann and Tomas Pivoda. Car 28 was raced by Proczyk joined by Jeroen Bleekemolen. Bleekemolen scored the team's first pole position at Nogaro. Bleekemolen, with less experience at Nogaro then his competition, lost the lead of the first race at the start in very wet conditions. After the driver change, Proczyk made contact with Audi driver Enzo Ide which ended with Proczyk in the gravel trap. The Bleekemolen/Proczyk duo was dominating in the second round winning both the first and second races. Bleekemolen put the Lamborghini on pole at his home race at Circuit Zandvoort. The Dutch driver won the first race in wet conditions, finishing fifth in the second race. The successful duo won a fourth race at Portimao. Bleekemolen defended a strong start to lead from start to finish. Proczyk and Bleekemolen finished third in the drivers championship. In the second car, Sascha Halek and Stefan Landmann finished second in the Pro-Am Trophy.

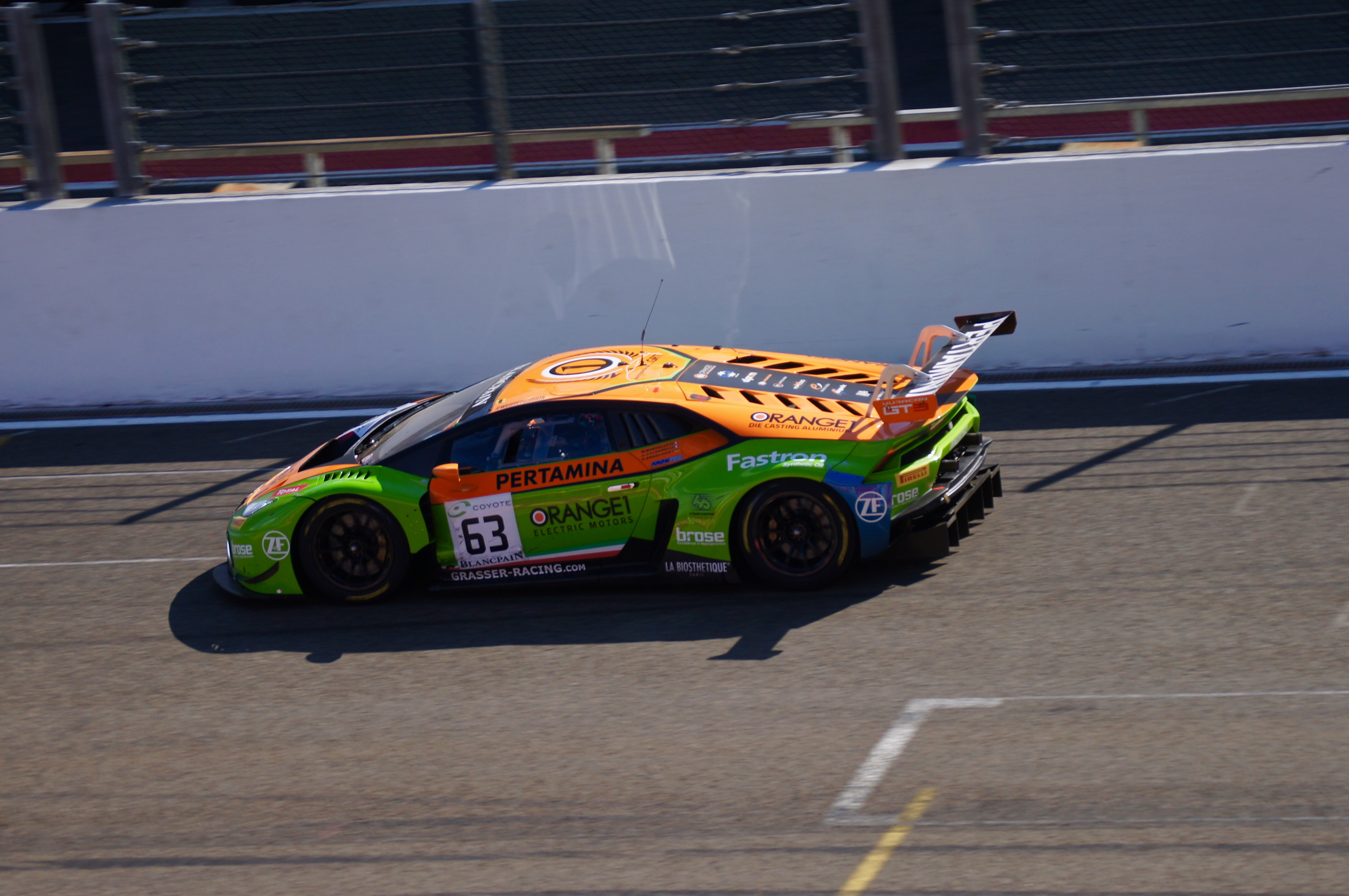
One of GRT's Lamborghini's entered at the 2018 24 Hours of Spa

From 2015 onwards, the Grasser Racing Team entered the new Lamborghini Huracán GT3 with factory backing. The team straight away took a home victory for Lamborghini at Monza in the Blancpain Endurance Series. Over the following years, the team would rack up several wins in the Blancpain endurance and sprint cups. In 2017, the Grasser Racing Team won the Overall Drivers' titles in both the Blancpain GT Series and Blancpain GT Series Endurance Cup as well as the Teams' championship in the Blancpain GT Series.

On the 28th of January 2018, GRT won the 24 Hours of Daytona in the GTD class, the opening race of the 2018 WeatherTech SportsCar Championship, with drivers Mirko Bortolotti, Rik Breukers, Rolf Ineichen and Franck Perera, a feat they repeated one year later by winning the 2019 24 Hours of Daytona. Less than two months later, they won the 2019 12 Hours of Sebring, again in the GTD Class. From 2020 onwards, the team decided to shift its focus on the ADAC GT Masters and the WeatherTech SportsCar Championship.

== Current series results ==
=== Deutsche Tourenwagen Masters ===
Year	Car	Drivers	Races	Wins	Poles	F/Laps	Podiums	Points	D.C.	T.C.
2022	Lamborghini Huracán GT3 Evo	(Italy) Mirko Bortolotti	16	0	2	3	5	121	4th	9th
2022	Lamborghini Huracán GT3 Evo	(Switzerland) Rolf Ineichen	14	0	0	1	0	1	27th	9th
2022	Lamborghini Huracán GT3 Evo	(France) Franck Perera	2	0	0	0	0	0	34th	9th
2022	Lamborghini Huracán GT3 Evo	(Austria) Clemens Schmid	16	0	0	0	0	11	22nd	16th
2022	Lamborghini Huracán GT3 Evo	(Italy) Alessio Deledda	16	0	0	0	0	1	26th	16th
2023	Lamborghini Huracán GT3 Evo 2	(Germany) Christian Engelhart†	9	1	0	0	2	54	17th	12th
2023	Lamborghini Huracán GT3 Evo 2	(Austria) Clemens Schmid	16	0	0	0	0	32	19th	12th
2023	Lamborghini Huracán GT3 Evo 2	(Germany) Maximilian Paul	4	1	0	0	1	28	21st	12th
2023	Lamborghini Huracán GT3 Evo 2	(Italy) Andrea Caldarelli	2	0	0	0	0	0	31st	12th
2023	Lamborghini Huracán GT3 Evo 2	(Austria) Mick Wishofer	6	0	0	0	0	0	33rd	12th
2024	Lamborghini Huracán GT3 Evo 2	(Germany) Luca Engstler	16	2	0	1	3	92	14th	8th
2024	Lamborghini Huracán GT3 Evo 2	(France) Franck Perera	8	0	0	0	1	39	17th	8th
2024	Lamborghini Huracán GT3 Evo 2	(Germany) Christian Engelhart	6	0	0	0	0	15	20th	8th
2024	Lamborghini Huracán GT3 Evo 2	(South Africa) Jordan Pepper	2	0	0	0	0	6	22nd	8th
2025	Lamborghini Huracán GT3 Evo 2	(South Africa) Jordan Pepper	16	1	3	0	3	164	7th	5th
2025	Lamborghini Huracán GT3 Evo 2	(Germany) Luca Engstler	16	0	0	0	0	81	12th	5th
2026	Lamborghini Huracán GT3 Evo 2	(Italy) Mirko Bortolotti	16	0	0	0	1	97	13th	10th
2026	Lamborghini Huracán GT3 Evo 2	(Germany) Maximilian Paul	11	0	0	0	0	14	20th	10th
2026	Lamborghini Huracán GT3 Evo 2	(Germany) Christian Engelhart	1	0	0	0	0	2	22nd	10th

† Engelhart drove for Toksport WRT until round 4.
