= Christian Engelhart =

German racing driver

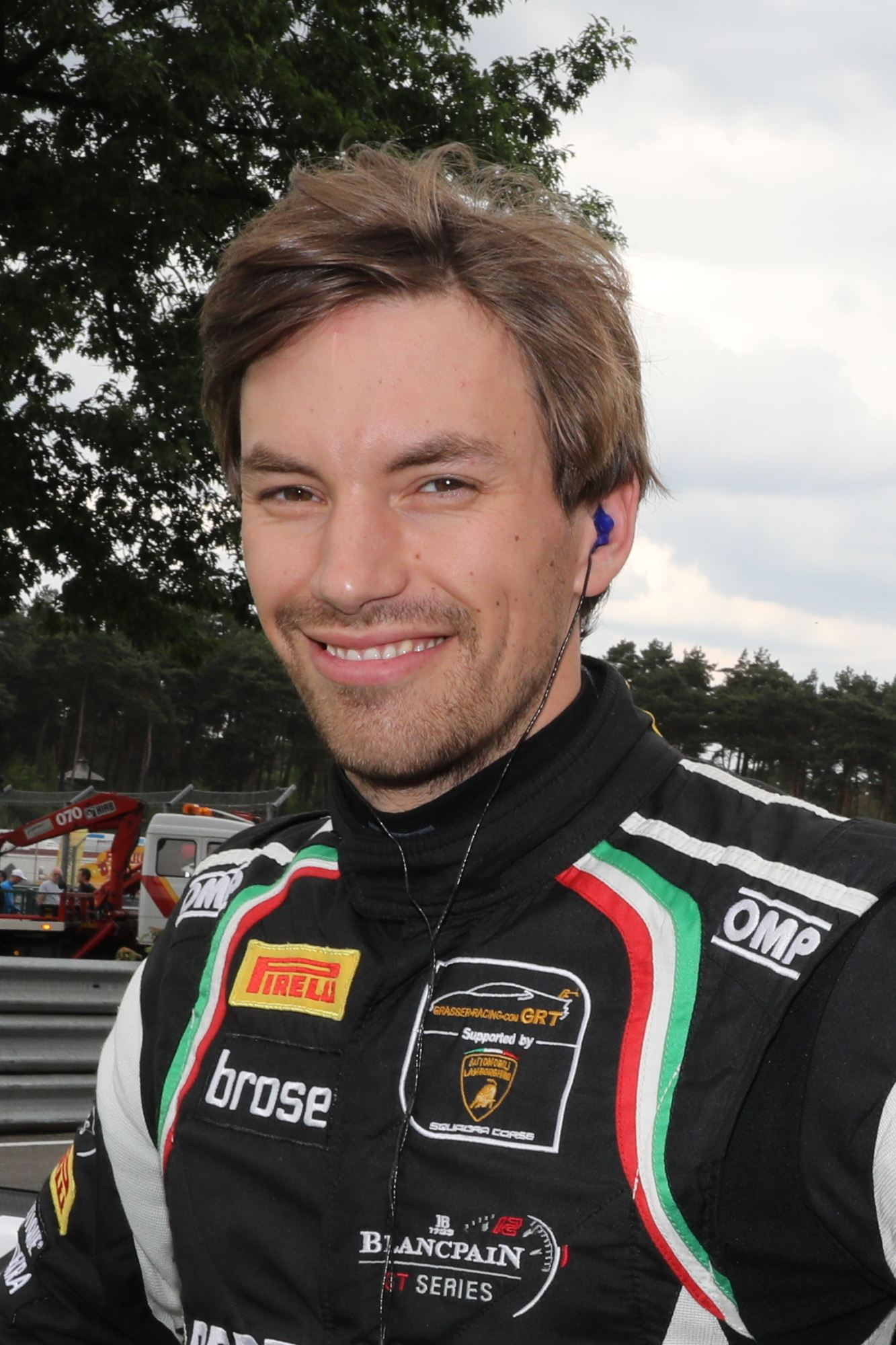
- Engelhart in 2017
- Nationality: (Germany) German
- Born: 13 December 1986 (age 39) Ingolstadt, West Germany

Deutsche Tourenwagen Masters career
- Debut season: 2022
- Current team: TGI Team by GRT
- Categorisation: FIA Silver (until 2014); FIA Gold (2015–2023); FIA Platinum (2024–)
- Car number: 19
- Former teams: SSR Performance; Toksport WRT
- Starts: 18
- Wins: 1
- Poles: 0
- Fastest laps: 0

Christian Engelhart (born 13 December 1986 in Ingolstadt) is a German racing driver, best known for his sports car racing career with Lamborghini.

Engelhart spent six seasons in Porsche Supercup, a period in which he won the Dubai 24 Hour in 2014. Upon joining Lamborghini as factory driver in 2017, Engelhart was crowned overall Blancpain GT Series and Blancpain GT Series Endurance Cup champion, partnering Mirko Bortolotti and Andrea Caldarelli at GRT Grasser Racing Team. After an incident where he destroyed the SD card of his onboard camera at Nürburgring in 2018, Engelhart was dropped by Lamborghini, but still won the 24 Hours of Daytona in GTD in early 2019.

A switch to Porsche in 2020 yielded an ADAC GT Masters title for Engelhart, driving for SSR Performance with Michael Ammermüller. In parallel, Engelhart added wins to his GT World Challenge Europe tally and made his DTM debut, winning race two at Oschersleben in 2023. Engelhart returned to Lamborghini in 2024.

== Racing record ==
=== Career summary ===
Season	Series	Team	Races	Wins	Poles	F/Laps	Podiums	Points	Position
2002	Formula BMW ADAC	Mamerow Racing Team	19	0	0	0	0	0	27th
2003	Formula BMW ADAC	MIS Motorsporttechnik	8	0	0	0	0	8	22nd
2006	Formula BMW ADAC	ADAC Berlin-Brandenburg	6	0	0	0	0	8	16th
2006	Formula BMW World Final	ASL Team Mücke Motorsport	1	0	0	0	0	N/A	22nd
2008	Porsche Carrera Cup Germany	tolimit	9	0	0	0	0	14	19th
2009	Porsche Carrera Cup Germany	MRS Team	9	0	0	0	1	54	9th
2009	Porsche Supercup	SANITEC Racing	2	0	0	0	0	15	16th
2010	Porsche Carrera Cup Germany	MRS Team	9	1	0	0	1	72	7th
2010	Porsche Supercup	Sanitec Giltrap Racing	8	0	0	0	1	54	11th
2011	ADAC GT Masters	MRS Team PZ Aschaffenburg	2	1	0	1	1	27	24th
2011	Porsche Carrera Cup Germany	Konrad Motorsport	2	0	0	0	0	13	20th
2011	Porsche Supercup	Konrad Motorsport	11	1	1	1	2	106	8th
2011	Porsche Carrera World Cup	Konrad Motorsport	1	0	0	0	0	N/A	16th
2012	ADAC GT Masters	Team Geyer & Weinig EDV-Unternehmensberatung Schütz Motorsport	16	4	2	0	5	144	**3rd**
2012	Porsche Supercup	Konrad Motorsport	10	1	1	1	3	87	8th
2012	City Challenge Baku	Konrad Motorsport	1	0	0	0	0	N/A	17th
2013	ADAC GT Masters	Team Geyer & Weinig EDV-Unternehmensberatung Schütz Motorsport	12	0	0	0	1	26	21st
2013	Porsche Carrera Cup Germany	Konrad Motorsport	17	3	1	2	9	239	**2nd**
2013	Rolex Sports Car Series - GT	Konrad Motorsport	1	0	0	0	0	16	62nd
2013	Porsche Supercup	FACH Auto Tech	8	0	0	0	1	69	8th
2014	ADAC GT Masters	GW IT Racing Team Schütz Motorsport	12	0	0	1	4	115	8th
2014	Porsche Carrera Cup Germany	Konrad Motorsport	18	3	2	5	6	208	**3rd**
2014	Porsche Supercup	Konrad Motorsport	10	0	0	0	0	75	9th
2014	United SportsCar Championship - GTD	Dempsey Racing	2	0	0	0	0	26	66th
2015	ADAC GT Masters	GW IT Racing Team Schütz Motorsport	4	1	0	0	1	37	22nd
2015	Porsche Carrera Cup Germany	TECE MRS-Racing	17	2	2	3	5	199	**2nd**
2015	Porsche Supercup	MRS GT-Racing	10	0	0	1	3	124	4th
2015	24H Series - 997	MRS GT-Racing							
2015	United SportsCar Championship - GTD	Konrad Motorsport	1	0	0	0	0	1	61st
2015	24H Series - A6	Stadler Motorsport							
2015	24 Hours of Nürburgring - SP7	Prosport-Performance	1	0	0	0	0	N/A	DNF
2016	ADAC GT Masters	GRT Grasser Racing Team	14	1	0	1	2	91	7th
2016	Blancpain GT Series Endurance Cup	GRT Grasser Racing Team	1	1	0	0	1	25	11th
2016	Porsche Carrera Cup Germany	MRS GT-Racing	16	2	2	2	13	263	**2nd**
2016	Porsche Supercup	MRS GT-Racing	9	0	0	0	1	76	7th
2016	24H Series - A6	Konrad Motorsport							
2016	24H Series - A6	GRT Grasser Racing Team							
2017	ADAC GT Masters	GRT Grasser Racing Team	12	2	1	3	3	95	7th
2017	Blancpain GT Series Endurance Cup	GRT Grasser Racing Team	5	2	0	1	3	86	**1st**
2017	Blancpain GT Series Sprint Cup	GRT Grasser Racing Team	10	2	1	2	4	67	4th
2017	IMSA SportsCar Championship - GTD	GRT Grasser Racing Team	2	0	0	0	0	38	50th
2017	Intercontinental GT Challenge	GRT Grasser Racing Team	1	0	0	0	0	0	NC
2017	24H Series - A6	GRT Grasser Racing Team							
2017	International GT Open	Imperiale Racing	2	0	0	0	0	?	?
2017	Porsche Carrera Cup Germany	Black Falcon	10	2	4	3	5	135	6th
2017	24 Hours of Nürburgring - SP9	Konrad Motorsport	1	0	0	0	0	N/A	DNF
2018	ADAC GT Masters	GRT Grasser Racing Team	14	0	1	2	2	39	17th
2018	Blancpain GT Series Endurance Cup	GRT Grasser Racing Team	5	0	0	0	0	13	31st
2018	Blancpain GT Series Sprint Cup	GRT Grasser Racing Team	9	2	2	0	3	57.5	5th
2018	IMSA SportsCar Championship - GTD	GRT Grasser Racing Team	1	0	0	0	0	18	57th
2018	24H GT Series - A6	GRT Grasser Racing Team							
2018	Belgian Endurance Championship	Independent Motorsports	1	1	0	0	1	163	7th
2019	ADAC GT Masters	Orange1 by GRT Grasser	14	3	3	1	4	146	**2nd**
2019	Blancpain GT Series Endurance Cup	GRT Grasser Racing Team	4	0	2	1	0	21	13th
2019	Blancpain GT World Challenge Europe	GRT Grasser Racing Team	10	0	1	0	6	75	4th
2019	IMSA SportsCar Championship - GTD	GRT Grasser Racing Team	1	1	0	0	1	35	42nd
2019	24H GT Series - A6	GRT Grasser Racing Team							
2020	ADAC GT Masters	SSR Performance	14	3	2	3	4	181	**1st**
2020	GT World Challenge Europe Endurance Cup	Dinamic Motorsport	4	1	0	0	2	53	**3rd**
2020	24 Hours of Nürburgring - SP9 Pro	Falken Motorsports	1	0	0	0	0	N/A	11th
2021	ADAC GT Masters	KÜS Team Bernhard	14	0	0	1	2	74	13th
2021	GT World Challenge Europe Endurance Cup	Dinamic Motorsport	5	1	0	0	2	53	6th
2021	GT World Challenge Europe Sprint Cup	Dinamic Motorsport	7	0	0	0	0	6	27th
2021	Intercontinental GT Challenge	Dinamic Motorsport	1	0	0	0	0	0	NC
2022	ADAC GT Masters	Team Joos Sportwagentechnik	14	2	2	0	4	178	**2nd**
2022	Deutsche Tourenwagen Masters	SSR Performance	2	0	0	0	0	0	31st
2022	GT World Challenge Europe Sprint Cup	Dinamic Motorsport	10	0	0	0	0	5	20th
2022	24 Hours of Nürburgring - SP9	Dinamic Motorsport	1	0	0	0	0	N/A	DNF
2023	ADAC GT Masters	Team Joos by RACEmotion	2	1	1	0	1	40	14th
2023	Deutsche Tourenwagen Masters	Toksport WRT	7	1	0	0	1	54	17th
2023	Deutsche Tourenwagen Masters	GRT Grasser Racing Team	2	0	0	0	1	54	17th
2023	GT World Challenge Europe Endurance Cup	Dinamic GT Huber Racing	3	0	0	0	0	11	16th
2023	GT World Challenge Europe Endurance Cup	Dinamic GT	2	0	0	0	0	11	16th
2023	GT World Challenge Europe Sprint Cup	Dinamic GT Huber Racing	10	0	0	0	0	3	20th
2023	Intercontinental GT Challenge	Dinamic GT Huber Racing	1	0	0	0	0	6	27th
2023	24 Hours of Nürburgring - SP9	Dinamic GT	1	0	0	0	0	N/A	DNF
2024	Deutsche Tourenwagen Masters	Lamborghini Team TGI by GRT	6	0	0	0	0	15	20th
2024	GT World Challenge Europe Endurance Cup	GRT Grasser Racing Team	1	0	0	0	0	0	NC
2025	Nürburgring Langstrecken-Serie - SP9	Red Bull Team ABT							
2025	24 Hours of Nürburgring - SP9	Abt Sportsline	1	0	0	0	0	N/A	5th
2025	GT World Challenge Europe Sprint Cup	GRT - Grasser Racing Team	6	0	0	0	0	0	NC
2025	GT World Challenge Europe Sprint Cup – Bronze	GRT - Grasser Racing Team	6	0	0	0	0	11	16th
2026	Nürburgring Langstrecken-Serie - SP9	Konrad Motorsport							
2026	24 Hours of Nürburgring - SP9	Konrad Motorsport	1	0	0	0	0	N/A	DNF
2026	International GT Open	Dinamic GT	2	0	0	0	0	0	50th
2026	Deutsche Tourenwagen Masters	TGI Team by GRT	1	0	0	0	0	2	22nd

=== Complete Porsche Supercup results ===
(key) (Races in bold indicate pole position; races in italics indicate fastest lap)

Year	Team	1	2	3	4	5	6	7	8	9	10	11	12	13	Pos.	Points
2009	SANITEC Racing	BHR	BHR	CAT	MON	IST	SIL; 10	NÜR; 11	HUN	VAL	SPA	MNZ	YMC	YMC	16th	15
2010	SANITEC GILTRAP Racing	BHR; 6	BHR; 23	CAT; 9	MON; 9	VAL; 14	SIL	HOC; 3	HUN	SPA; 9	MNZ; 22				11th	54
2011	Konrad Motorsport	**IST**; 1	CAT; 9	MON; 12	NNS; 10	SIL; 5	NÜR; 8	HUN; Ret	SPA; 5	MNZ; 18	YMC; 5	YMC; 3			8th	106
2012	Konrad Motorsport	BHR; 5	BHR; 2	MON; 3	VAL; 15	SIL; Ret	HOC; Ret	HUN; 7	HUN; 1	SPA; Ret	MNZ; 7				8th	87
2013	FACH Auto Tech	ESP	MON; 5	SIL; 8	NÜR; Ret	HUN; 2	SPA; 12	MNZ; 4	YMC; 9	YMC; 12					8th	69
2014	Konrad Motorsport	CAT; 4	MON; 8	RBR; 4	SIL; 13	HOC; 7	HUN; 14	SPA; Ret	MNZ; 12	COA; 6	COA; 6				9th	75
2015	MRS GT-Racing	CAT; 3	MON; 4	RBR; 5	SIL; 5	HUN; 3	SPA; 5	SPA; 3	MNZ; 8	MNZ; 4	COA; C	COA; 13			4th	124
2016	MRS GT-Racing	CAT; Ret	MON; 6	RBR; 16	SIL; 11	HUN	HOC; 5	SPA; 3	MNZ; Ret	COA; 5	COA; 6				7th	76

=== Complete ADAC GT Masters results ===
(key) (Races in bold indicate pole position; races in italics indicate fastest lap)

Year	Team	Car	1	2	3	4	5	6	7	8	9	10	11	12	13	14	15	16	Pos.	Points
2011	MRS Team PZ Aschaffenburg	Porsche 911 GT3 R	OSC; 1	OSC; 2	SAC; 1	SAC; 2	ZOL; 1	ZOL; 2	NÜR; 1	NÜR; 2	RBR; 1; 1	RBR; 2; 9	LAU; 1	LAU; 2	ASS; 1	ASS; 2	HOC; 1	HOC; 2	24th	27
2012	Team Geyer & Weinig EDV-Unternehmensberatung Schütz Motorsport	Porsche 911 GT3 R	OSC; 1; 5	OSC; 2; 1	ZAN; 1; 18	ZAN; 2 Ret	SAC; 1 Ret	SAC; 2; 23	NÜR; 1; 3	NÜR; 2; 4	RBR; 1; 1	RBR; 2; 25	**LAU**; **1**; 1	LAU; 2; 1	NÜR; 1; 7	NÜR; 2; 10	**HOC**; **1**; 13	HOC; 2; 16	**3rd**	**144**
2013	Team Geyer & Weinig EDV-Unternehmensberatung Schütz Motorsport	Porsche 911 GT3 R	OSC; 1; 20	OSC; 2 Ret	SPA; 1; 14	SPA; 2; 8	SAC; 1; 2	SAC; 2; 11	NÜR; 1; 9	NÜR; 2 Ret	RBR; 1; 9	RBR; 2 Ret	LAU; 1; 20	LAU; 2; 21	SVK; 1	SVK; 2	HOC; 1	HOC; 2	21st	26
2014	GW IT Racing Team Schütz Motorsport	Porsche 911 GT3 R	OSC; 1; 3	OSC; 2; 2	ZAN; 1	ZAN; 2	LAU; 1	LAU; 2	RBR; 1; 9	RBR; 2; 11	SLO; 1; 5	SLO; 2; 5	NÜR; 1; 5	NÜR; 2; 4	SAC; 1; 2	SAC; 2; 17	HOC; 1; 11	HOC; 2; 2	8th	115
2015	GW IT Racing Team Schütz Motorsport	Porsche 911 GT3 R	OSC; 1; 1	OSC; 2; 4	RBR; 1	RBR; 2	SPA; 1	SPA; 2	LAU; 1	LAU; 2	NÜR; 1	NÜR; 2	SAC; 1	SAC; 2	ZAN; 1	ZAN; 2	HOC; 1 Ret	HOC; 2 Ret	22nd	37
2016	GRT Grasser Racing Team	Lamborghini Huracán GT3	OSC; 1; 8	OSC; 2; 1	SAC; 1; 12	SAC; 2; 28	LAU; 1; 2	LAU; 2 Ret	RBR; 1; 6	RBR; 2; 4	NÜR; 1; 8	NÜR; 2; 7	ZAN; 1; 20	ZAN; 2; 19	HOC; 1; 9	HOC; 2; 4			7th	91
2017	GRT Grasser Racing Team	Lamborghini Huracán GT3	OSC; 1; 9	OSC; 2; 12	LAU; 1; 15	LAU; 2; 3	RBR; 1; 18	**RBR**; **2**; 1	ZAN; 1; 7	ZAN; 2 Ret	NÜR; 1; 11	NÜR; 2; 4	SAC; 1	SAC; 2	HOC; 1; 5	HOC; 2; 1			7th	95
2018	GRT Grasser Racing Team	Lamborghini Huracán GT3	OSC; 1 DSQ	OSC; 2; 2	MST; 1; 17	MST; 2; 15	RBR; 1; 12	RBR; 2; 24	NÜR; 1; 10	NÜR; 2; 33	ZAN; 1; 9	ZAN; 2 Ret	SAC; 1 Ret	SAC; 2; 14	HOC; 1 Ret	HOC; 2; 2			17th	39
2019	GRT Grasser Racing Team	Lamborghini Huracán GT3 Evo	OSC; 1 Ret	**OSC**; **2**; 21	MST; 1; 2	MST; 2; 23	RBR; 1; 25	RBR; 2; 5	**ZAN**; **1**; 1	ZAN; 2; 6	**NÜR**; **1**; 1	NÜR; 2 Ret	HOC; 1; 1	HOC; 2; 8	SAC; 1; 5	SAC; 2; 6			**2nd**	**146**
2020	SSR Performance	Porsche 911 GT3 R	LAU; 1; 2	LAU; 2; 4	**NÜR**; **1**; 1	NÜR; 2; 16	HOC; 1; 1	HOC; 2; 18	SAC; 1; 6	SAC; 2; 6	RBR; 1; 5	RBR; 2; 4	LAU; 1; 6	LAU; 2; 11	**OSC**; **1**; 1	OSC; 2; 4			**1st**	**181**
2021	KÜS Team Bernhard	Porsche 911 GT3 R	OSC; 1; 26	OSC; 2; 8	RBR; 1; 11	RBR; 2; 17	ZAN; 1 Ret	ZAN; 2 Ret	LAU; 1 Ret	LAU; 2; 15	SAC; 1; 5	SAC; 2; 3	HOC; 1; 12	HOC; 2; 4	NÜR; 1; 3	NÜR; 2 Ret			13th	74
2022	Team Joos Sportwagentechnik	Porsche 911 GT3 R	OSC; 1; 5	OSC; 2; 21	RBR; 1; 2^{2}	RBR; 2; 3^{3}	ZAN; 1; 6	ZAN; 2; 8^{2}	NÜR; 1; 5^{3}	NÜR; 2; 13	**LAU**; **1**; 1^{1}	LAU; 2; 4	SAC; 1; 5	SAC; 2 Ret	HOC; 1; 1	**HOC**; **2**; 4^{1}			**2nd**	**178**
2023	Team Joos by RACEmotion	Porsche 911 GT3 R (992)	HOC; 1	HOC; 2	NOR; 1	NOR; 2	NÜR; 1	NÜR; 2	SAC; 1	SAC; 2	RBR; 1; 5^{3}	**RBR**; **2**; 1^{1}	HOC; 1	HOC; 2					14th	40

=== Complete IMSA SportsCar Championship results ===
(key) (Races in bold indicate pole position; results in italics indicate fastest lap)

Year	Team	Class	Make	Engine	1	2	3	4	5	6	7	8	9	10	11	12	Pos.	Points
2014	Dempsey Racing	GTD	Porsche 911 GT America	Porsche 4.0 L Flat-6	DAY; 19	SEB; 19	LGA	DET	WGL	MOS	IND	ELK	VIR	COA	PET		66th	26
2015	Konrad Motorsport	GTD	Porsche 911 GT America	Porsche 4.0 L Flat-6	DAY; 19†	SEB	LGA	BEL	WGL	LIM	ELK	VIR	COA	PET			61st	1
2017	GRT Grasser Racing Team	GTD	Lamborghini Huracán GT3	Lamborghini 5.2 L V10	DAY; 15	SEB; 9	LBH	AUS	BEL	WGL	MOS	LIM	ELK	VIR	LGA	PET	50th	38
2018	GRT Grasser Racing Team	GTD	Lamborghini Huracán GT3	Lamborghini 5.2 L V10	DAY; 13	SEB	MDO	BEL	WGL	MOS	LIM	ELK	VIR	LGA	PET		57th	18
2019	GRT Grasser Racing Team	GTD	Lamborghini Huracán GT3 Evo	Lamborghini 5.2 L V10	DAY; 1	SEB	MDO	DET	WGL	MOS	LIM	ELK	VIR	LGA	PET		42nd	35

=== Complete 24 Hours of Nürburgring results ===
Year	Team	Co-Drivers	Car	Class	Laps	Pos.	Class Pos.
2015	(Germany) Prosport-Performance	(United States) Charles Espenlaub (United States) Charles Putman (Norway) Oskar Sandberg	Porsche 997 Cup	SP7	85	DNF	DNF
2017	(Austria) Konrad Motorsport	(Germany) Dominik Farnbacher (Italy) Marco Mapelli (Germany) Hendrik Still	Lamborghini Huracán GT3	SP9	17	DNF	DNF
2020	(Germany) Falken Motorsports	(Austria) Klaus Bachler (Germany) Sven Müller (Germany) Dirk Werner	Porsche 911 GT3 R	SP9 Pro	83	11th	11th
2022	(Italy) Dinamic Motorsport	(Italy) Matteo Cairoli (Belgium) Adrien De Leener (Denmark) Frederik Schandorff	Porsche 911 GT3 R	SP9 Pro	11	DNF	DNF
2023	(Italy) Dinamic GT	(Turkey) Ayhancan Güven (Germany) Laurin Heinrich (Belgium) Laurens Vanthoor	Porsche 911 GT3 R	SP9 Pro	83	DNF	DNF
2025	(Germany) Abt Sportsline	(Germany) Luca Engstler (Italy) Marco Mapelli	Lamborghini Huracán GT3 Evo 2	SP9 Pro	140	5th	4th
2026	(Austria) Konrad Motorsport	(Bulgaria) Pavel Lefterov (Germany) Maximilian Paul (Latvia) Patricija Stalidzane	Lamborghini Huracán GT3 Evo 2	SP9 Pro	69	DNF	DNF

=== Complete GT World Challenge Europe results ===
(key) (Races in bold indicate pole position) (Races in italics indicate fastest lap)

==== GT World Challenge Europe Endurance Cup ====
Year	Team	Car	Class	1	2	3	4	5	6	7	Pos.	Points
2016	GRT Grasser Racing Team	Lamborghini Huracán GT3	Pro	MNZ	SIL	LEC	SPA; 6H	SPA; 12H	SPA; 24H	NÜR; 1	11th	25
2017	GRT Grasser Racing Team	Lamborghini Huracán GT3	Pro	MNZ; 1	SIL; 1	LEC; 13	SPA; 6H; 2	SPA; 12H; 1	SPA; 24H; Ret	CAT; 3	1st	86
2018	GRT Grasser Racing Team	Lamborghini Huracán GT3	Pro	MNZ; 4	SIL; 10	LEC; 13	SPA; 6H; 55	SPA; 12H; 59	SPA; 24H; Ret	CAT; 13	31st	13
2019	GRT Grasser Racing Team	Lamborghini Huracán GT3 Evo	Pro	**MNZ**; 40	**SIL**; 36	LEC; 7	SPA; 6H; 2	SPA; 12H; 6	SPA; 24H; 16	CAT	13th	21
2020	Dinamic Motorsport	Porsche 911 GT3 R	Pro	IMO; 10	NÜR; 1	SPA; 6H; 13	SPA; 12H; 7	SPA; 24H; 3	LEC; 10		3rd	53
2021	Dinamic Motorsport	Porsche 911 GT3 R	Pro	MNZ; 1	LEC; 7	SPA; 6H; 18	SPA; 12H; 6	SPA; 24H; Ret	NÜR; 40	CAT; 2	6th	53
2023	Dinamic GT Huber Racing	Porsche 911 GT3 R (992)	Pro	MNZ; 9	LEC; Ret	SPA; 6H; 16	SPA; 12H; 13	SPA; 24H; 12			15th	13
2023	Dinamic GT	Porsche 911 GT3 R (992)	Pro						NÜR; 10	CAT; 6	15th	13
2024	GRT Grasser Racing Team	Lamborghini Huracán GT3 Evo 2	Pro	LEC; 11	SPA; 6H	SPA; 12H	SPA; 24H	NÜR	MNZ	JED	NC	0

==== GT World Challenge Europe Sprint Cup ====
Year	Team	Car	Class	1	2	3	4	5	6	7	8	9	10	Pos.	Points
2017	GRT Grasser Racing Team	Lamborghini Huracán GT3	Pro	MIS; QR; 8	MIS; CR; 9	**BRH**; **QR**; 1	BRH; CR; 1	ZOL; QR; Ret	ZOL; CR; 15	HUN; QR; 2	HUN; CR; 3	NÜR; QR; 19	NÜR; CR; 5	4th	67
2018	GRT Grasser Racing Team	Lamborghini Huracán GT3	Pro	ZOL; 1; 1	**ZOL**; **2**; 7	BRH; 1; 10	BRH; 2; 5	MIS; 1; 3	MIS; 2; 18	HUN; 1; 1	HUN; 2; 6	**NÜR**; **1** DSQ	NÜR; 2 EX	5th	57.5
2019	GRT Grasser Racing Team	Lamborghini Huracán GT3 Evo	Pro	BRH; 1; 3	BRH; 2; 10	MIS; 1; 6	MIS; 2; 16	ZAN; 1; 2	ZAN; 2; 2	**NÜR**; **1**; 2	NÜR; 2; 8	HUN; 1; 3	HUN; 2; 2	4th	75
2021	Dinamic Motorsport	Porsche 911 GT3 R	Pro	MAG; 1; 16	MAG; 2; 20	ZAN; 1; 12	ZAN; 2; 24	MIS; 1 Ret	MIS; 2 DNS	BRH; 1	BRH; 2	VAL; 1; 12	VAL; 2; 5	27th	6
2022	Dinamic Motorsport	Porsche 911 GT3 R	Pro	BRH; 1 Ret	BRH; 2 Ret	MAG; 1; 12	MAG; 2; 10	ZAN; 1; 17	ZAN; 2; 6	MIS; 1; 12	MIS; 2 Ret	VAL; 1 Ret	VAL; 2; 14	20th	5
2023	Dinamic GT Huber Racing	Porsche 911 GT3 R (992)	Pro	BRH; 1 DSQ	BRH; 2; 12	MIS; 1; 20	MIS; 2 Ret	HOC; 1; 9	HOC; 2; 8	VAL; 1; 17	VAL; 2; 16	ZAN; 1 Ret	ZAN; 2; 16	20th	3
2025	GRT - Grasser Racing Team	Lamborghini Huracán GT3 Evo 2	Bronze	ZAN; 1; 27	ZAN; 2; 36	MIS; 1 Ret	MIS; 2 Ret	MAG; 1	MAG; 2	VAL; 1; 18	VAL; 2; 33			16th	11

=== Complete Deutsche Tourenwagen Masters results ===
(key) (Races in bold indicate pole position) (Races in italics indicate fastest lap)

Year	Team	Car	1	2	3	4	5	6	7	8	9	10	11	12	13	14	15	16	Pos	Points
2022	SSR Performance	Porsche 911 GT3 R	ALG; 1	ALG; 2	LAU; 1	LAU; 2	IMO; 1	IMO; 2	NOR; 1	NOR; 2	NÜR; 1	NÜR; 2	SPA; 1	SPA; 2	RBR; 1	RBR; 2	HOC; 1; 14	HOC; 2 Ret	31st	0
2023	Toksport WRT	Porsche 911 GT3 R (992)	OSC; 1; 9	OSC; 2; 1	ZAN; 1; 23	ZAN; 2; 12	NOR; 1 Ret	NOR; 2; 17	NÜR; 1 Ret	NÜR; 2 WD	LAU; 1	LAU; 2	SAC; 1	SAC; 2	RBR; 1	RBR; 2			17th	54
2023	GRT Grasser Racing Team	Lamborghini Huracán GT3 Evo 2															HOC; 1; 3^{3}	HOC; 2 Ret	17th	54
2024	Lamborghini Team TGI by GRT	Lamborghini Huracán GT3 Evo 2	OSC; 1; 16	OSC; 2; 8	LAU; 1; 9	LAU; 2; 15	ZAN; 1 Ret	ZAN; 2 Ret	NOR; 1	NOR; 2	NÜR; 1	NÜR; 2	SAC; 1	SAC; 2	RBR; 1	RBR; 2	HOC; 1	HOC; 2	20th	16
2026	TGI Team by GRT	Lamborghini Temerario GT3	RBR; 1	RBR; 2	ZAN; 1	ZAN; 2	LAU; 1	LAU; 2	NOR; 1	NOR; 2	OSC; 1	OSC; 2	NÜR; 1; 14	NÜR; 2 WD	SAC; 1	SAC; 2	HOC; 1	HOC; 2	22nd	2

Sporting positions
Preceded by Rob Bell; Côme Ledogar; Shane van Gisbergen	Blancpain GT Series Endurance Cup; Champion; 2017; With: Mirko Bortolotti & Andrea Caldarelli	Succeeded by Yelmer Buurman; Maro Engel; Luca Stolz
Preceded by Dominik Baumann; Maximilian Buhk	Blancpain GT Series; Champion; 2017; With: Mirko Bortolotti	Succeeded by Raffaele Marciello
Preceded by Kelvin van der Linde; Patric Niederhauser	ADAC GT Masters; Champion; 2020; With: Michael Ammermüller	Succeeded by Ricardo Feller; Christopher Mies
