= 2017 Blancpain GT Series =

2017 sports car racing series

The 2017 Blancpain GT Series was the fourth season of the Blancpain GT Series. The season started on 2 April in Misano and ended on 1 October in Barcelona. The season featured ten rounds, five Endurance Cup rounds and five Sprint Cup rounds.

== Calendar ==
At the annual press conference during the 2016 24 Hours of Spa on 29 July, the Stéphane Ratel Organisation announced the first draft of the 2017 calendar. On 7 November, the SRO announced the calendar was finalised.

Event	Circuit	Date	Series	Report
1	Misano World Circuit Marco Simoncelli, Misano Adriatico, Italy	2 April	Sprint	Report
2	Autodromo Nazionale Monza, Monza, Italy	23 April	Endurance	Report
3	(United Kingdom) Brands Hatch, Kent, Great Britain	7 May	Sprint	Report
4	(United Kingdom) Silverstone Circuit, Silverstone, Great Britain	14 May	Endurance	Report
5	Circuit Zolder, Heusden-Zolder, Belgium	4 June	Sprint	Report
6	Circuit Paul Ricard, Le Castellet, France	24 June	Endurance	Report
7	Circuit de Spa-Francorchamps, Spa, Belgium	29–30 July	Endurance	Report
8	Hungaroring, Mogyoród, Hungary	27 August	Sprint	Report
9	Nürburgring, Nürburg, Germany	17 September	Sprint	Report
10	Circuit de Barcelona-Catalunya, Montmeló, Spain	1 October	Endurance	Report

== Race results ==
Bold indicates overall winner.

Event		Circuit	Pole position	Pro Winners	Pro-Am Winners	Silver Winners (Note: The SRO Motorsports Group decided not to have a Silver Cup championship in the Blancpain GT Series, because Silver Cup entries are only allowed in the Blancpain GT Series Sprint Cup.)	Am Winners
1	QR	(Italy) Misano	(Germany) No. 66 Attempto Racing	(Germany) **No. 84 Mercedes-AMG Team HTP Motorsport**	(Switzerland) No. 11 Kessel Racing	(Germany) No. 85 HTP Motorsport	No entries
1	QR	(Italy) Misano	(Italy) Marco Mapelli (Italy) Giovanni Venturini	(Germany) **Maximilian Buhk** (France) **Franck Perera**	(Poland) Michał Broniszewski (Italy) Giacomo Piccini	(Germany) Fabian Schiller (Netherlands) Jules Szymkowiak	No entries
1	MR	(Italy) Misano		(Germany) **No. 84 Mercedes-AMG Team HTP Motorsport**	(Germany) No. 333 Rinaldi Racing	(Germany) No. 85 HTP Motorsport	No entries
1	MR	(Italy) Misano		(Germany) **Maximilian Buhk** (France) **Franck Perera**	(Germany) Daniel Keilwitz (Germany) Alexander Mattschull	(Germany) Fabian Schiller (Netherlands) Jules Szymkowiak	No entries
2		(Italy) Monza	(Italy) No. 50 AF Corse	(Austria) **No. 63 GRT Grasser Racing Team**	No. 97 Oman Racing Team with TF Sport	Did not participate	(Italy) No. 961 AF Corse
2		(Italy) Monza	(Thailand) Pasin Lathouras (Italy) Alessandro Pier Guidi (Italy) Michele Rugolo	(Italy) **Mirko Bortolotti** (Italy) **Andrea Caldarelli** (Germany) **Christian Engelhart**	(United Kingdom) Jonathan Adam (Oman) Ahmad Al Harthy	Did not participate	(Lebanon) Alex Demirdjian (United Kingdom) Abbie Eaton (Italy) Davide Rizzo
3	QR	(United Kingdom) Brands Hatch	(Austria) No. 63 GRT Grasser Racing Team	(Austria) **No. 63 GRT Grasser Racing Team**	(Germany) No. 333 Rinaldi Racing	(United Kingdom) No. 42 Strakka Motorsport	No entries
3	QR	(United Kingdom) Brands Hatch	(Italy) Mirko Bortolotti (Germany) Christian Engelhart	(Italy) **Mirko Bortolotti** (Germany) **Christian Engelhart**	(Germany) Daniel Keilwitz (Germany) Alexander Mattschull	(Italy) David Fumanelli (United Kingdom) Lewis Williamson	No entries
3	MR	(United Kingdom) Brands Hatch		(Austria) **No. 63 GRT Grasser Racing Team**	(Germany) No. 333 Rinaldi Racing	(United Kingdom) No. 42 Strakka Motorsport	No entries
3	MR	(United Kingdom) Brands Hatch		(Italy) **Mirko Bortolotti** (Germany) **Christian Engelhart**	(Germany) Daniel Keilwitz (Germany) Alexander Mattschull	(Italy) David Fumanelli (United Kingdom) Lewis Williamson	No entries
4		(United Kingdom) Silverstone	(France) No. 88 AKKA ASP	(Austria) **No. 63 GRT Grasser Racing Team**	(United Kingdom) No. 77 Barwell Motorsport	Did not participate	(Germany) No. 488 Rinaldi Racing
4		(United Kingdom) Silverstone	(Spain) Daniel Juncadella (Puerto Rico) Félix Serrallés (France) Tristan Vautier	(Italy) **Mirko Bortolotti** (Italy) **Andrea Caldarelli** (Germany) **Christian Engelhart**	(Switzerland) Adrian Amstutz (Croatia) Martin Kodrić (Finland) Patrick Kujala	Did not participate	(Germany) Pierre Ehret (Italy) Rino Mastronardi
5	QR	(Belgium) Zolder	(Belgium) No. 17 Team WRT	(Belgium) **No. 17 Team WRT**	(Switzerland) No. 39 Kessel Racing TP12	(United Kingdom) No. 42 Strakka Motorsport	(Switzerland) No. 888 Kessel Racing
5	QR	(Belgium) Zolder	(Netherlands) Robin Frijns (United Kingdom) Stuart Leonard	(Netherlands) **Robin Frijns** (United Kingdom) **Stuart Leonard**	(Thailand) Piti Bhirombhakdi (Netherlands) Carlo van Dam	(Italy) David Fumanelli (United Kingdom) Lewis Williamson	(United States) Stephen Earle (South Africa) David Perel
5	MR	(Belgium) Zolder		(Belgium) **No. 2 Belgian Audi Club Team WRT**	(Switzerland) No. 11 Kessel Racing	(Germany) No. 85 HTP Motorsport	(Switzerland) No. 888 Kessel Racing
5	MR	(Belgium) Zolder		(United Kingdom) **Will Stevens** (Germany) **Markus Winkelhock**	(Poland) Michał Broniszewski (Italy) Giacomo Piccini	(Germany) Fabian Schiller (Netherlands) Jules Szymkowiak	(United States) Stephen Earle (South Africa) David Perel
6		(France) Paul Ricard	(Germany) No. 4 Mercedes-AMG Team Black Falcon	(United Kingdom) **No. 8 Bentley Team M-Sport**	(United Kingdom) No. 77 Barwell Motorsport	Did not participate	(Switzerland) No. 888 Kessel Racing
6		(France) Paul Ricard	(Netherlands) Yelmer Buurman (United Kingdom) Adam Christodoulou (Germany) Luca Stolz	(Monaco) **Vincent Abril** (Spain) **Andy Soucek** (Belgium) **Maxime Soulet**	(Switzerland) Adrian Amstutz (Croatia) Martin Kodrić (Finland) Patrick Kujala	Did not participate	(Belgium) Jacques Duyver (South Africa) David Perel (Italy) Marco Zanuttini
7		(Belgium) Spa-Francorchamps	(Italy) No. 55 Kaspersky Motorsport	(France) **No. 25 Audi Sport Team Saintéloc**	(Germany) No. 16 Black Falcon	Did not participate	(Switzerland) No. 888 Kessel Racing
7		(Belgium) Spa-Francorchamps	(United Kingdom) James Calado (Italy) Marco Cioci (Italy) Giancarlo Fisichella	(France) **Jules Gounon** (Germany) **Christopher Haase** (Germany) **Markus Winkelhock**	(Germany) Maximilian Götz (Germany) Marvin Kirchhöfer (United Kingdom) Oliver Morley (Spain) Miguel Toril	Did not participate	(Italy) Niki Cadei (Belgium) Jacques Duyver (South Africa) David Perel (Italy) Marco Zanuttini
8	QR	(Hungary) Hungaroring	(Belgium) No. 5 Belgian Audi Club Team WRT	(Belgium) **No. 5 Belgian Audi Club Team WRT**	(Germany) No. 333 Rinaldi Racing	(Germany) No. 85 HTP Motorsport	(Switzerland) No. 888 Kessel Racing
8	QR	(Hungary) Hungaroring	(Switzerland) Marcel Fässler (Belgium) Dries Vanthoor	(Switzerland) **Marcel Fässler** (Belgium) **Dries Vanthoor**	(Germany) Daniel Keilwitz (Germany) Alexander Mattschull	(Germany) Fabian Schiller (Netherlands) Jules Szymkowiak	(United States) Stephen Earle (South Africa) David Perel
8	MR	(Hungary) Hungaroring		(Belgium) **No. 5 Belgian Audi Club Team WRT**	(Germany) No. 333 Rinaldi Racing	(Germany) No. 85 HTP Motorsport	No finishers
8	MR	(Hungary) Hungaroring		(Switzerland) **Marcel Fässler** (Belgium) **Dries Vanthoor**	(Germany) Daniel Keilwitz (Germany) Alexander Mattschull	(Germany) Fabian Schiller (Netherlands) Jules Szymkowiak	No finishers
9	QR	(Germany) Nürburgring	(Belgium) No. 5 Belgian Audi Club Team WRT	(Germany) **No. 84 Mercedes-AMG Team HTP Motorsport**	(Germany) No. 333 Rinaldi Racing	(Germany) No. 85 HTP Motorsport	(Switzerland) No. 888 Kessel Racing
9	QR	(Germany) Nürburgring	(Switzerland) Marcel Fässler (Belgium) Dries Vanthoor	(Germany) **Maximilian Buhk** (France) **Franck Perera**	(Germany) Daniel Keilwitz (Germany) Alexander Mattschull	(Germany) Fabian Schiller (Netherlands) Jules Szymkowiak	(United States) Stephen Earle (South Africa) David Perel
9	MR	(Germany) Nürburgring		(Belgium) **No. 17 Team WRT**	(Germany) No. 333 Rinaldi Racing	(Germany) No. 85 HTP Motorsport	(Switzerland) No. 888 Kessel Racing
9	MR	(Germany) Nürburgring		(Netherlands) **Robin Frijns** (United Kingdom) **Stuart Leonard**	(Germany) Daniel Keilwitz (Germany) Alexander Mattschull	(Germany) Fabian Schiller (Netherlands) Jules Szymkowiak	(United States) Stephen Earle (South Africa) David Perel
10		(Spain) Barcelona-Catalunya	(Belgium) No. 17 Team WRT	(France) **No. 88 AKKA ASP**	(United Kingdom) No. 77 Barwell Motorsport	Did not participate	(Germany) No. 488 Rinaldi Racing
10		(Spain) Barcelona-Catalunya	(United Kingdom) Jake Dennis (Netherlands) Robin Frijns (United Kingdom) Stuart Leonard	(Spain) **Daniel Juncadella** (Puerto Rico) **Félix Serrallés** (France) **Tristan Vautier**	(United Kingdom) Hunter Abbott (Croatia) Martin Kodrić (Finland) Patrick Kujala	Did not participate	(Germany) Pierre Ehret (Italy) Rino Mastronardi

== Championship standings ==
Scoring system

Championship points were awarded for the first six positions in each Qualifying Race and for the first ten positions in each Main Race. The pole-sitter in the Qualifying Race during Sprint Cup rounds and the pole-sitter during Endurance Cup rounds also received one point and entries were required to complete 75% of the winning car's race distance in order to be classified and earn points. Individual drivers were required to participate for a minimum of 25 minutes in order to earn championship points in any race.

Qualifying Race points

Position	**1st**	**2nd**	**3rd**	**4th**	**5th**	**6th**	**Pole**
Points	8	6	4	3	2	1	1

Main Race points

Position	**1st**	**2nd**	**3rd**	**4th**	**5th**	**6th**	**7th**	**8th**	**9th**	**10th**	**Pole**
Points	25	18	15	12	10	8	6	4	2	1	1

1000 km Paul Ricard points

Position	**1st**	**2nd**	**3rd**	**4th**	**5th**	**6th**	**7th**	**8th**	**9th**	**10th**	**Pole**
Points	33	24	19	15	12	9	6	4	2	1	1

24 Hours of Spa points

Points were awarded after six hours, after twelve hours and at the finish.

Position	**1st**	**2nd**	**3rd**	**4th**	**5th**	**6th**	**7th**	**8th**	**9th**	**10th**	**Pole**
Points after 6hrs/12hrs	12	9	7	6	5	4	3	2	1	0	1
Points at the finish	25	18	15	12	10	8	6	4	2	1	1

=== Drivers' championships ===
==== Overall ====
(key) Bold – Pole position Italics – Fastest lap

Pos.	Driver	Team	MIS (Italy)		MNZ (Italy)	BRH (United Kingdom)		SIL (United Kingdom)	ZOL (Belgium)		LEC (France)	SPA (Belgium)			HUN (Hungary)		NÜR (Germany)		CAT (Spain)	Points
Pos.	Driver	Team	QR	MR	MNZ (Italy)	QR	MR	SIL (United Kingdom)	QR	MR	LEC (France)	6hrs	12hrs	24hrs	QR	MR	QR	MR	CAT (Spain)	Points
1	(Italy) Mirko Bortolotti (Germany) Christian Engelhart	(Austria) GRT Grasser Racing Team	8	9	1	**1**	1	1	Ret	15	13	2	1	Ret	2	3	19	5	3	153
2	(Germany) Maximilian Buhk (France) Franck Perera	(Germany) Mercedes-AMG Team HTP Motorsport	1	1	3	23	6	2	16	6	40	3	52	Ret	4	6	1	Ret	4	120
3	(Monaco) Vincent Abril	(United Kingdom) Bentley Team M-Sport	4	2	6	20	12	5	12	5	1	5	5	2	13	Ret	11	7	Ret	116
4	(United Kingdom) Stuart Leonard	(Belgium) Team WRT	12	24	12	7	2	13	**1**	3	6	62	62	Ret	5	4	6	1	**2**	110
5	(Netherlands) Robin Frijns	(Belgium) Team WRT				7	2		**1**	3	6				5	4	6	1	**2**	110
6	(Italy) Andrea Caldarelli	(Austria) GRT Grasser Racing Team			1			1			13	2	1	Ret			2	3	3	107
7	(Germany) Markus Winkelhock	(Belgium) Belgian Audi Club Team WRT	Ret	DNS		11	3		3	1					7	5	5	2		104
7	(Germany) Markus Winkelhock	(Belgium) Team WRT			12															104
7	(Germany) Markus Winkelhock	(France) Audi Sport Team Saintéloc									9	7	13	1						104
8	(Spain) Andy Soucek (Belgium) Maxime Soulet	(United Kingdom) Bentley Team M-Sport	Ret	DNS	6	24	18	5	15	19	1	5	5	2	6	25	4	15	Ret	83
9	(United Kingdom) Will Stevens	(Belgium) Belgian Audi Club Team WRT	Ret	DNS	Ret	11	3	Ret	3	1	Ret				7	5	5	2	Ret	74
10	(Sweden) Jimmy Eriksson	(Germany) Mercedes-AMG Team HTP Motorsport			3			2			40	3	52	Ret					4	73
10	(Sweden) Jimmy Eriksson	(Germany) HTP Motorsport	20	3		17	22		8	29					11	7	23	17		73
11	(Switzerland) Marcel Fässler (Belgium) Dries Vanthoor	(Belgium) Belgian Audi Club Team WRT	9	Ret	Ret	18	5	Ret	13	4	Ret				**1**	1	**3**	10	Ret	62
11	(Switzerland) Marcel Fässler (Belgium) Dries Vanthoor	(Belgium) Audi Sport Team WRT										31	19	11						62
12	(Spain) Daniel Juncadella (Puerto Rico) Félix Serrallés	(France) AKKA ASP	5	4	30	4	27	**11**	5	25	4				15	Ret	Ret	19	1	60
12	(Spain) Daniel Juncadella (Puerto Rico) Félix Serrallés	(France) Mercedes-AMG Team AKKA ASP										10	46	Ret						60
13	(Italy) Raffaele Marciello (United Kingdom) Michael Meadows	(France) AKKA ASP	3	16	Ret	8	7	3	2	24	10	11	4	3	9	12	13	14	7	59
14	(United Kingdom) Jake Dennis	(Belgium) Team WRT	14	10	12	13	9	13	24	9	6	62	62	Ret	3	2	12	12	**2**	55
15	(Germany) Fabian Schiller	(Germany) HTP Motorsport	2	12	Ret	16	17	37	17	8	Ret	6	2	7	14	8	9	6	6	49
16	(Austria) Dominik Baumann	(Germany) HTP Motorsport	20	3	Ret	17	22	37	8	29	Ret	6	2	7	11	7	23	17	6	48
17	(Germany) Christopher Haase	(France) Saintéloc Racing	7	5	Ret	Ret	8	36	31	14					10	9			17	46
17	(Germany) Christopher Haase	(France) Audi Sport Team Saintéloc									9	7	13	1						46
18	(Spain) Miguel Molina (Italy) Davide Rigon (Russia) Viktor Shaytar	(Russia) SMP Racing			5			4			2	51	36	24					Ret	46
19	(Italy) Edoardo Mortara	(France) AKKA ASP			Ret			3			10	11	4	3					7	43
20	(United Kingdom) Steven Kane	(United Kingdom) Bentley Team M-Sport	4	2	DSQ	20	12	9	12	5	35	18	21	14	13	Ret	11	7	19	39
21	(Finland) Markus Palttala	(Germany) Rowe Racing	11	7		2	4	41	26	12	Ret				12	11	10	4	Ret	36
21	(Finland) Markus Palttala	(Germany) Walkenhorst Motorsport										21	23	20						36
22	(Finland) Jesse Krohn	(Germany) Rowe Racing	11	7		2	4	41	26	12							10	4		36
23	(United Kingdom) James Calado (Italy) Marco Cioci (Italy) Giancarlo Fisichella	(Italy) Kaspersky Motorsport			4			23			Ret	**1**	3	Ret					18	32
24	(Czech Republic) Filip Salaquarda	(Czech Republic) ISR	10	15	29	12	Ret	Ret	4	2	7	59	59	Ret	17	DNS			8	31
25	(Netherlands) Pieter Schothorst	(Belgium) Team WRT	14	10		13	9		24	9					3	2	12	12		31
25	(Netherlands) Pieter Schothorst	(Belgium) Audi Sport Team WRT									8									31
25	(Netherlands) Pieter Schothorst	(United Kingdom) Strakka Racing										58	58	Ret						31
26	(Spain) Antonio García (Switzerland) Nico Müller (Germany) René Rast	(Belgium) Audi Sport Team WRT									3	12	8	6						29
27	(France) Jules Gounon	(France) AKKA ASP	Ret	26	17	22	23	22	23	22	15				27	21			36	28
27	(France) Jules Gounon	(France) Audi Sport Team Saintéloc										7	13	1						28
28	(Thailand) Pasin Lathouras (Italy) Alessandro Pier Guidi (Italy) Michele Rugolo	(Switzerland) Spirit of Race			**2**			6			23	63	63	Ret					15	27
29	(Austria) Clemens Schmid	(Czech Republic) ISR	10	15	29	12	Ret	Ret	4	2	7	59	59	Ret	17	DNS				27
30	(Sweden) Edward Sandström	(Germany) HTP Motorsport			Ret			37			Ret	6	2	7					6	27
31	(France) Tristan Vautier	(France) AKKA ASP			30			**11**									27	24	1	26
31	(France) Tristan Vautier	(France) Mercedes-AMG Team AKKA ASP										10	46	Ret						26
32	(Argentina) Ezequiel Pérez Companc	(Austria) GRT Grasser Racing Team	Ret	DNS	Ret	3	Ret	17	7	10	Ret	33	22	18	21	13	2	3	31	26
33	(Germany) Christopher Mies	(Belgium) Belgian Audi Club Team WRT	6	11		Ret	14		6	13					8	18				22
33	(Germany) Christopher Mies	(Belgium) Audi Sport Team WRT									8	4	10	5						22
34	(Netherlands) Jules Szymkowiak	(Germany) HTP Motorsport	2	12		16	17		17	8					14	8	9	6		22
35	(Belgium) Frédéric Vervisch	(Belgium) Audi Sport Team WRT									8	4	10	5						20
35	(Belgium) Frédéric Vervisch	(Belgium) Belgian Audi Club Team WRT															14	16		20
35	(Belgium) Frédéric Vervisch	(Austria) GRT Grasser Racing Team																	31	20
36	(Netherlands) Yelmer Buurman (United Kingdom) Adam Christodoulou (Germany) Luca Stolz	(Germany) Mercedes-AMG Team Black Falcon			10			Ret			**33**								5	19
36	(Netherlands) Yelmer Buurman (United Kingdom) Adam Christodoulou (Germany) Luca Stolz	(Germany) Black Falcon										13	7	8						19
37	(United States) Connor De Phillippi	(Belgium) Audi Sport Team WRT										4	10	5						16
38	(France) Romain Monti	(France) Saintéloc Racing	7	5		Ret	8		31	14					10	9			17	16
39	(Austria) Philipp Eng	(Germany) Rowe Racing	16	6		5	Ret	7	14	Ret	Ret	44	27	33	12	11			12	16
40	(Netherlands) Renger van der Zande	(France) AKKA ASP									4									15
40	(Netherlands) Renger van der Zande	(Germany) Black Falcon										19	45	Ret						15
40	(Netherlands) Renger van der Zande	(Austria) GRT Grasser Racing Team																	31	15
41	(France) Kévin Estre	(Germany) KÜS TEAM75 Bernhard										20	11	4						13
41	(France) Kévin Estre	(Germany) Attempto Racing													16	10				13
42	(United Kingdom) Tom Blomqvist	(Germany) Rowe Racing	16	6							Ret	15	6	10					Ret	13
43	(Denmark) Michael Christensen (Belgium) Laurens Vanthoor	(Germany) KÜS TEAM75 Bernhard										20	11	4						12
44	(United Kingdom) Alex Buncombe (Japan) Katsumasa Chiyo (Spain) Lucas Ordóñez	(United Kingdom) Motul Team RJN Nissan			Ret			16			5	17	16	13					13	12
45	(Germany) Frank Stippler	(Czech Republic) ISR	21	25	29	10	Ret	Ret	28	30					26	14	Ret	Ret	8	9
45	(Germany) Frank Stippler	(Czech Republic) Audi Sport Team ISR									29	8	9	9						9
46	(United Kingdom) Rob Bell	(United Kingdom) Strakka Racing	18	8	9	15	21	34	22	11	Ret	60	60	Ret	24	17	16	9		8
47	(United Kingdom) Jonathan Adam (Oman) Ahmad Al Harthy	Oman Racing Team with TF Sport			7			21			14	9	14	15					26	7
48	(Italy) Marco Mapelli (Italy) Giovanni Venturini	(Germany) Attempto Racing	**23**	27	DNS	9	13	19	9	7	Ret									7
49	(Belgium) Maxime Martin (United Kingdom) Alexander Sims	(Germany) Rowe Racing						7			Ret	44	27	33					12	6
50	(Portugal) Filipe Albuquerque	(Czech Republic) ISR									7	59	59	Ret						6
51	(United Kingdom) Andrew Watson	(United Kingdom) Strakka Racing	18	8	Ret	15	21	29	22	11	36	58	58	Ret	24	17	16	9	Ret	6
52	(Portugal) Álvaro Parente	(United Kingdom) Strakka Racing	22	18		6	10		10	28					20	24				6
52	(Portugal) Álvaro Parente	(United Kingdom) Strakka Motorsport						8												6
53	(Austria) Norbert Siedler	(Austria) GRT Grasser Racing Team	Ret	DNS	Ret	3	Ret	17	7	10	Ret									5
53	(Austria) Norbert Siedler	(Germany) Rinaldi Racing										54	56	Ret						5
53	(Austria) Norbert Siedler	(Switzerland) Emil Frey Jaguar Racing																	11	5
54	(Canada) Bruno Spengler	(Germany) Rowe Racing						41			Ret	15	6	10					Ret	5
55	(Netherlands) Nick Catsburg	(Germany) Rowe Racing										15	6	10						5
56	(South Africa) Kelvin van der Linde	(Czech Republic) Audi Sport Team ISR									29	8	9	9						5
57	(Germany) Pierre Kaffer	(Czech Republic) Audi Sport Team ISR										8	9	9						5
58	(United Kingdom) Jonny Kane	(United Kingdom) Strakka Racing	Ret	DNS	11	DNS	DNS	Ret	Ret	Ret	16	38	44	Ret			8	8	14	4
59	(Netherlands) Steijn Schothorst	(United Kingdom) Strakka Racing															8	8	Ret	4
60	(Italy) Kevin Ceccon	(Czech Republic) ISR	21	25		10	Ret		28	30					26	14	Ret	Ret	8	4
60	(Italy) Kevin Ceccon	(Germany) Team Zakspeed			32															4
61	(United Kingdom) Lewis Williamson	(United Kingdom) Strakka Motorsport	19	13		14	11	8	11	18					25	Ret	17	13	22	4
61	(United Kingdom) Lewis Williamson	(United Kingdom) Strakka Racing			Ret						38	28	48	Ret						4
62	(Poland) Michał Broniszewski	(Switzerland) Kessel Racing	13	22	8	27	25	44	20	16	32	22	17	Ret					28	4
63	(Italy) Matteo Cressoni (Italy) Andrea Rizzoli	(Switzerland) Kessel Racing			8			44			32	22	17	Ret						4
64	(United Kingdom) Oliver Webb	(United Kingdom) Strakka Motorsport						8												4
64	(United Kingdom) Oliver Webb	(United Kingdom) Strakka Racing										28	48	Ret						4
65	(United Kingdom) Ben Barnicoat	(United Kingdom) Strakka Racing	22	18	9	6	10	34	10	28	Ret	60	60	Ret	20	24	Ret	25	14	4
66	(Portugal) António Félix da Costa	(Germany) Rowe Racing				5	Ret		14	Ret							7	11		2
67	(United Kingdom) Oliver Jarvis (United Kingdom) Guy Smith	(United Kingdom) Bentley Team M-Sport			DSQ			9			35	18	21	14					19	2
68	(Germany) Peter Terting	(France) Audi Sport Team Saintéloc									9									2
68	(Germany) Peter Terting	(France) Saintéloc Racing															20	22		2
69	(France) Côme Ledogar	(United Kingdom) Strakka Racing			9			34	Ret	Ret	Ret	60	60	Ret			Ret	25		2
70	(France) Nathanaël Berthon (Monaco) Stéphane Richelmi (France) Benoît Tréluyer	(Belgium) Belgian Audi Club Team WRT			DNS			Ret			Ret								9	2
70	(France) Nathanaël Berthon (Monaco) Stéphane Richelmi (France) Benoît Tréluyer	(Belgium) Team WRT										55	57	Ret						2
71	(Belgium) Enzo Ide	(Belgium) Belgian Audi Club Team WRT	6	11		Ret	14		6	13					8	18	14	16		2
72	(Turkey) Salih Yoluç	Oman Racing Team with TF Sport									14	9	14	15					26	1
73	(United Kingdom) Euan Hankey	Oman Racing Team with TF Sport										9	14	15						1
74	(Monaco) Stéphane Ortelli	(Switzerland) Emil Frey Jaguar Racing			31			10			39	46	55	Ret					11	1
74	(Monaco) Stéphane Ortelli	(Switzerland) Emil Frey Lexus Racing															22	21		1
75	(Switzerland) Jonathan Hirschi (Austria) Christian Klien (Germany) Marco Seefried	(Switzerland) Emil Frey Jaguar Racing			Ret			12			34	61	61	Ret					10	1
76	(Austria) Klaus Bachler	(Germany) Attempto Racing													16	10				1
77	(Spain) Albert Costa	(Switzerland) Emil Frey Jaguar Racing			31			10			39	46	55	Ret						1
77	(Spain) Albert Costa	(Switzerland) Emil Frey Lexus Racing															22	21		1
78	(Switzerland) Lorenz Frey	(Switzerland) Emil Frey Jaguar Racing			31			10			39	46	55	Ret						1
	(Germany) Jens Klingmann	(Germany) Rowe Racing															7	11		0
	(Italy) David Fumanelli	(United Kingdom) Strakka Racing			11			Ret			16	38	44	Ret					22	0
	(Italy) David Fumanelli	(United Kingdom) Strakka Motorsport				14	11		11	18										0
	(United Kingdom) Struan Moore (United Kingdom) Matt Parry (Australia) Matt Simmons	(United Kingdom) Motul Team RJN Motorsport			13			24			11	48	32	30					Ret	0
	(United Kingdom) Sam Tordoff	(United Kingdom) Strakka Racing			11			Ret			16	38	44	Ret					14	0
	(Germany) André Lotterer	(Belgium) Audi Sport Team WRT										31	19	11						0
	(Switzerland) Alex Fontana	(France) AKKA ASP			Ret			32			Ret	56	50	Ret						0
	(Switzerland) Alex Fontana	(Switzerland) Emil Frey Jaguar Racing																	11	0
	(United Kingdom) Oliver Morley (Spain) Miguel Toril	(Germany) Black Falcon			19			Ret			20	14	12	12					30	0
	(Germany) Marvin Kirchhöfer	(Germany) Black Falcon										14	12	12					30	0
	(Germany) Maximilian Götz	(Germany) Black Falcon										14	12	12						0
	(Croatia) Martin Kodrić	(United Kingdom) Barwell Motorsport			23			20			12	42	30	Ret					16	0
	(Croatia) Martin Kodrić	(United Kingdom) Strakka Motorsport													25	Ret	17	13		0
	(United Kingdom) Jamie Green	(Belgium) Team WRT	12	24				13				62	62	Ret						0
	(United Kingdom) Jamie Green	(Czech Republic) Audi Sport Team ISR									29									0
	(Finland) Patrick Kujala	(United Kingdom) Barwell Motorsport			23			20			12	42	30	Ret					16	0
	(Switzerland) Adrian Amstutz	(United Kingdom) Barwell Motorsport			23			20			12	42	30	Ret						0
	(Italy) Giacomo Piccini	(Switzerland) Kessel Racing	13	22		27	25		20	16		22	17	Ret					28	0
	(Italy) Raffaele Giammaria	(Austria) GRT Grasser Racing Team			Ret			17			Ret	33	22	18	21	13				0
	(United Kingdom) Nick Leventis	(United Kingdom) Strakka Motorsport	19	13																0
	(United Kingdom) Nick Leventis	(United Kingdom) Strakka Racing			WD						38	28	48	Ret					22	0
	(Italy) Fabrizio Crestani	(Italy) Orange 1 Team Lazarus	15	17	21	21	15	14			21	30	20	21	23	23	25	23	25	0
	(Colombia) Gustavo Yacamán	(Italy) Orange 1 Team Lazarus	15	17	21	21	15	14	29	Ret										0
	(Germany) Alexander Mattschull	(Germany) Rinaldi Racing	25	14	16	19	16	EX	19	27	19	54	56	Ret	18	15	18	18	20	0
	(Germany) Daniel Keilwitz	(Germany) Rinaldi Racing	25	14	16	19	16	EX	19	27					18	15	18	18	20	0
	(Germany) Kenneth Heyer	(Germany) Kornely Motorsport	24	23		WD	WD													0
	(Germany) Kenneth Heyer	(Germany) MANN-FILTER Team HTP Motorsport			14			Ret			18	47	51	Ret					40	0
	(Germany) Patrick Assenheimer (Netherlands) Indy Dontje	(Germany) MANN-FILTER Team HTP Motorsport			14			Ret			18	47	51	Ret					40	0
	(Germany) Nicolas Pohler	(Italy) Orange 1 Team Lazarus			21			14			21	30	20	21	23	23	25	23	25	0
	(Germany) Nicolas Pohler	(Germany) Attempto Racing				Ret	26		21	21										0
	(Italy) Michele Beretta (Italy) Stefano Gattuso (Italy) Andrea Piccini	(Italy) Ombra Racing			22			15			Ret	35	24	16					23	0
	(France) Jean-Luc Beaubelique	(France) AKKA ASP	Ret	26	17	22	23	22	23	22	15				27	21	27	24	36	0
	(Germany) Nico Bastian	(France) AKKA ASP			17			22			15	56	50	Ret					21	0
	(Netherlands) Niek Hommerson (Belgium) Louis Machiels	(Switzerland) Spirit of Race			15			33			17	23	38	Ret					Ret	0
	(Italy) Andrea Bertolini	(Switzerland) Spirit of Race			15						17	23	38	Ret					Ret	0
	(Italy) Davide Rizzo	(Italy) AF Corse			27															0
	(Italy) Davide Rizzo	(China) BBT									Ret									0
	(Italy) Davide Rizzo	(Switzerland) Spirit of Race										24	15	17						0
	(Lebanon) Alex Demirdjian	(Italy) AF Corse			27															0
	(Lebanon) Alex Demirdjian	(Switzerland) Spirit of Race										24	15	17						0
	(Finland) Toni Vilander	(China) BBT									Ret									0
	(Finland) Toni Vilander	(Switzerland) Spirit of Race										24	15	17						0
	(France) Nicolas Minassian	(Switzerland) Spirit of Race										24	15	17						0
	(Switzerland) Rolf Ineichen	(Austria) GRT Grasser Racing Team										33	22	18			15	29		0
	(France) Tom Dillmann	(Austria) GRT Grasser Racing Team															15	29	41	0
	(Thailand) Piti Bhirombhakdi (Netherlands) Carlo van Dam	(Switzerland) Kessel Racing TP12	17	19		26	20		18	20					19	16	26	20		0
	(Germany) Christer Jöns (South Africa) Jordan Pepper (Belgium) Nico Verdonck	(Germany) Bentley Team ABT										16	18	Ret						0
	(Russia) Rinat Salikhov	(Germany) Rinaldi Racing			16			EX			19	54	56	Ret			24	28	20	0
	(United Kingdom) Hunter Abbott	(Germany) HTP Motorsport						25												0
	(United Kingdom) Hunter Abbott	(United Kingdom) Barwell Motorsport																	16	0
	(Italy) Lorenzo Casè (United Kingdom) Phil Quaife	(Switzerland) Spirit of Race	Ret	DNS		25	19		25	17					22	19	DNS	DNS		0
	(France) Simon Gachet	(France) Saintéloc Racing															20	22	17	0
	(Germany) Nico Menzel	(Germany) Walkenhorst Motorsport			Ret			18			26	21	23	20					Ret	0
	(Norway) Christian Krognes	(Germany) Walkenhorst Motorsport						18			26	21	23	20					Ret	0
	(Republic of Ireland) Damien Faulkner (United States) Mike Skeen	(Germany) HTP Motorsport			18			25												0
	(Denmark) Mikkel Jensen	(Germany) Walkenhorst Motorsport			Ret			18			26								Ret	0
	(Italy) Gian Maria Gabbiani	(Germany) HTP Motorsport			18															0
	(Monaco) Olivier Beretta (Italy) Lorenzo Bontempelli (Japan) Motoaki Ishikawa	(Italy) AF Corse			Ret			38			Ret	34	25	19					24	0
	(Italy) Matteo Malucelli	(Germany) Rinaldi Racing									19	54	56	Ret			24	28		0
	(Monaco) Francesco Castellacci	(Italy) AF Corse										34	25	19						0
	(Germany) Hubert Haupt (Italy) Gabriele Piana	(Germany) Black Falcon									Ret	19	45	Ret						0
	(Saudi Arabia) Abdulaziz Bin Turki Al Faisal	(Germany) Black Falcon										19	45	Ret						0
	(Germany) Manuel Metzger	(Germany) Black Falcon			19			Ret												0
	(Belgium) Bertrand Baguette	(Germany) Attempto Racing						19			Ret									0
	(Netherlands) Max van Splunteren	(Germany) Attempto Racing	Ret	DNS	26	Ret	26	30	21	21	Ret	50	39	35	28	20	21	Ret	33	0
	(Italy) Luca Filippi	(Germany) Attempto Racing			DNS															0
	(Italy) Luca Filippi	(Italy) Orange 1 Team Lazarus									21	30	20	21						0
	(Finland) Matias Henkola	(Germany) Walkenhorst Motorsport						42				21	23	20					DNS	0
	(France) Jean-Philippe Belloc (France) Christophe Bourret	(France) AKKA ASP	Ret	20		28	24		27	23					29	22	29	26		0
	(Italy) Andrea Amici (Italy) Stefano Costantini (Denmark) Dennis Lind	(Italy) Raton Racing			20			27			37									0
	(Austria) Christopher Zöchling	(Germany) Attempto Racing													28	20				0
	(Republic of Ireland) Matt Griffin	(Germany) Black Falcon									20									0
	(Republic of Ireland) Matt Griffin	(Italy) AF Corse										26	29	23						0
	(Finland) Marko Helistekangas (Australia) Caitlin Wood	(Germany) Reiter Young Stars	26	21		WD	WD				Ret								35	0
	(France) Ludovic Badey (Switzerland) Daniele Perfetti	(France) AKKA ASP			Ret			32			Ret	56	50	Ret					21	0
	(Spain) Isaac Tutumlu	(Germany) Attempto Racing															21	Ret	33	0
	(South Africa) David Perel	(Switzerland) Kessel Racing			Ret			39	30	26	28	29	26	22	30	Ret	28	27	39	0
	(Belgium) Jacques Duyver (Italy) Marco Zanuttini	(Switzerland) Kessel Racing			Ret			39			28	29	26	22					39	0
	(Italy) Niki Cadei	(Switzerland) Kessel Racing										29	26	22						0
	(United States) Dore Chaponick Jr. (United States) Scott Heckert (United States) Brett Sandberg	(Germany) Black Falcon			Ret			40			22	27	47	Ret					38	0
	(Japan) Yoshiharu Mori	(Germany) Kornely Motorsport	24	23		WD	WD													0
	(United Kingdom) Duncan Cameron (Italy) Riccardo Ragazzi (United Kingdom) Aaron Scott	(Italy) AF Corse										26	29	23						0
	(United Kingdom) Rory Butcher	(Switzerland) Spirit of Race						33				23	38	Ret						0
	(United Kingdom) Josh Caygill (Australia) Jonathan Venter	(Belgium) Team WRT			24			31			25	25	42	Ret					34	0
	(Austria) Nikolaus Mayr-Melnhof	(Belgium) Team WRT			24			31				25	42	Ret						0
	(United Kingdom) Richard Abra (Russia) Leo Machitski	(United Kingdom) Barwell Motorsport			Ret			26			24	57	49	Ret					27	0
	(Portugal) Miguel Ramos	(United Kingdom) Barwell Motorsport			Ret			26			24	57	49	Ret						0
	(Germany) Jürgen Häring (Germany) Alfred Renauer (Germany) Robert Renauer	(Germany) Herberth Motorsport			25			28			27	37	54	Ret					29	0
	(Germany) Pierre Ehret (Italy) Rino Mastronardi	(Germany) Rinaldi Racing			Ret			35			31	39	28	25					32	0
	(Belgium) Patrick Van Glabeke (Italy) Gabriele Lancieri	(Germany) Rinaldi Racing										39	28	25						0
	(United Kingdom) Richard Lyons	(Belgium) Team WRT										25	42	Ret						0
	(Switzerland) Hugo de Sadeleer	(Belgium) Team WRT									25									0
	(Poland) Artur Janosz	(Italy) Orange 1 Team Lazarus																	25	0
	(United States) Stephen Earle	(Switzerland) Kessel Racing							30	26					30	Ret	28	27		0
	(France) Clément Mateu	(Germany) Attempto Racing			26			30			Ret	45	35	31						0
	(France) Clément Mateu	(Belgium) Team WRT																	34	0
	(Italy) Giorgio Maggi	(Germany) Attempto Racing			26			30			Ret	45	35	31						0
	(Germany) Henry Walkenhorst	(Germany) Walkenhorst Motorsport						42			30	41	33	26					DNS	0
	(Germany) David Schiwietz	(Germany) Walkenhorst Motorsport						42			30	41	33	26						0
	(Belgium) Stef Van Campenhout	(Germany) Walkenhorst Motorsport									30	41	33	26						0
	(Germany) Ralf Oeverhaus	(Germany) Walkenhorst Motorsport										41	33	26						0
	(Netherlands) Jeroen Bleekemolen	(Germany) Black Falcon										27	47	Ret						0
	(Netherlands) Jeroen Bleekemolen	(United Kingdom) Barwell Motorsport																	27	0
	(France) Marc Rostan	(France) Saintéloc Racing			Ret			36			Ret	40	31	27						0
	(France) Marc Rostan	(Austria) Team HB Racing																	37	0
	(Belgium) Christian Kelders	(France) Saintéloc Racing			Ret			36			Ret	40	31	27						0
	(Belgium) Frédéric Bouvy	(France) Saintéloc Racing										40	31	27						0
	(United Kingdom) Abbie Eaton	(Italy) AF Corse			27															0
	(Belgium) Bernard Delhez	(Austria) Team HB Racing			28			43			Ret	43	34	28					37	0
	(France) Gilles Vannelet	(Austria) Team HB Racing			28			43			Ret	43	34	28						0
	(Germany) Mike Stursberg	(Austria) Team HB Racing						43			Ret	43	34	28						0
	(Switzerland) Christopher Zanella	(Austria) Team HB Racing										43	34	28						0
	(United Kingdom) Craig Fleming	(United Kingdom) Strakka Racing			Ret						38	28	48	Ret						0
	(Switzerland) Daniel Allemann (Germany) Ralf Bohn (France) Mathieu Jaminet (Germany) Sven Müller	(Germany) Herberth Motorsport										36	37	29						0
	(Malaysia) Jazeman Jaafar	(United Kingdom) Strakka Racing			Ret			29			36	58	58	Ret					Ret	0
	(United Kingdom) Dean Stoneman	(United Kingdom) Strakka Racing			Ret			29			36									0
	(Italy) Nicola de Marco	(Italy) Orange 1 Team Lazarus							29	Ret										0
	(United Kingdom) Oliver Gavin	(United Kingdom) Barwell Motorsport										42	30	Ret						0
	(Belgium) Sarah Bovy (Germany) Jürgen Krebs	(Germany) Attempto Racing										45	35	31						0
	(Finland) Rory Penttinen	(Germany) Rinaldi Racing									31									0
	(United Kingdom) Chris Goodwin (United Kingdom) Chris Harris (Sweden) Alexander West	(United Kingdom) Garage 59						Ret				52	41	32						0
	(United Kingdom) Bradley Ellis	(United Kingdom) Garage 59										52	41	32						0
	(Japan) Tatsuya Kataoka (Japan) Kamui Kobayashi (Japan) Nobuteru Taniguchi	(Japan) Good Smile Racing with Team UKYO										32	43	Ret						0
	(Germany) Immanuel Vinke	(Germany) Team Zakspeed			32			Ret												0
	(Germany) Luca Ludwig	(Germany) Team Zakspeed			32															0
	(Andorra) Manel Cerqueda Diez	(Germany) Attempto Racing																	33	0
	(Netherlands) Jaap van Lagen	(Germany) Walkenhorst Motorsport			Ret															0
	(Netherlands) Jaap van Lagen	(Germany) Attempto Racing										50	39	35						0
	(Canada) Mikaël Grenier	(Germany) Attempto Racing										50	39	35						0
	(Czech Republic) Tomáš Enge	(Germany) Reiter Young Stars									Ret								35	0
	(Italy) Mauro Ricci	(France) AKKA ASP																	36	0
	(Germany) Marc Lieb	(Germany) Herberth Motorsport										37	54	Ret						0
	(Germany) Edward Lewis Brauner	(Austria) Team HB Racing																	37	0
	(Italy) Giorgio Roda (Italy) Paolo Ruberti	(Austria) GRT Grasser Racing Team																	41	0
	(Portugal) Rui Águas (Argentina) José Manuel Balbiani (Greece) Kriton Lendoudis	(Germany) Team Zakspeed			Ret			45												0
	(United Kingdom) Phil Keen	(United Kingdom) Barwell Motorsport										57	49	Ret						0
	(Netherlands) Loris Hezemans	(United Kingdom) Strakka Racing	Ret	DNS		DNS	DNS													
	(South Africa) Adrian Zaugg	(Germany) Attempto Racing	Ret	DNS																
	(Italy) Beniamino Caccia (Germany) Jörg Viebahn	(Germany) Team Zakspeed						Ret												
	(Germany) Maro Engel	(Germany) Black Falcon									Ret									
	(China) Anthony Liu	(China) BBT									Ret									
	(France) Grégory Guilvert	(France) Saintéloc Racing									Ret									
	(United States) Ace Robey	(Germany) Walkenhorst Motorsport																	DNS	
Drivers ineligible to score points
	(Belgium) Thierry de Latre du Bosqueau (Belgium) Grégory Paisse (Belgium) Pierre-Yves Paque (Belgium) Louis-Philippe Soenen	(Belgium) SpeedLover										49	40	34						
	(United States) Howard Blank (France) Yannick Mallegol (United States) Frank Mechaly (Monaco) Fabrice Notari	(France) RMS										53	53	Ret						
Pos.	Driver	Team	QR	MR	MNZ (Italy)	QR	MR	SIL (United Kingdom)	QR	MR	LEC (France)	6hrs	12hrs	24hrs	QR	MR	QR	MR	CAT (Spain)	Points
Pos.	Driver	Team	MIS (Italy)		MNZ (Italy)	BRH (United Kingdom)		SIL (United Kingdom)	ZOL (Belgium)		LEC (France)	SPA (Belgium)			HUN (Hungary)		NÜR (Germany)		CAT (Spain)	Points

==== Pro-Am Cup ====
Pos.	Driver	Team	MIS (Italy)		MNZ (Italy)	BRH (United Kingdom)		SIL (United Kingdom)	ZOL (Belgium)		LEC (France)	SPA (Belgium)			HUN (Hungary)		NÜR (Germany)		CAT (Spain)	Points
Pos.	Driver	Team	QR	MR	MNZ (Italy)	QR	MR	SIL (United Kingdom)	QR	MR	LEC (France)	6hrs	12hrs	24hrs	QR	MR	QR	MR	CAT (Spain)	Points
1	(Germany) Alexander Mattschull	(Germany) Rinaldi Racing	25	14	16	19	16	EX	19	27	19	54	56	Ret	18	15	**18**	18	20	186
2	(Germany) Daniel Keilwitz	(Germany) Rinaldi Racing	25	14	16	19	16	EX	19	27					18	15	**18**	18	20	174
3	(France) Jean-Luc Beaubelique	(France) AKKA ASP	**Ret**	26	17	**22**	23	**22**	23	22	15				**27**	21	27	24	**36**	133
4	(Thailand) Piti Bhirombhakdi (Netherlands) Carlo van Dam	(Switzerland) Kessel Racing TP12	17	19		26	20		**18**	20					19	16	26	20		119
5	(United Kingdom) Jonathan Adam (Oman) Ahmad Al Harthy	Oman Racing Team with TF Sport			**7**			21			14	**9**	14	15					26	116
6	(France) Jules Gounon	(France) AKKA ASP	**Ret**	26	17	**22**	23	**22**	23	22	15				**27**	21			**36**	115
7	(Poland) Michał Broniszewski	(Switzerland) Kessel Racing	13	22	8	27	25	44	20	16	**32**	22	17	Ret					28	96
8	(Croatia) Martin Kodrić (Finland) Patrick Kujala	(United Kingdom) Barwell Motorsport			23			20			12	42	30	Ret					16	87
9	(Italy) Giacomo Piccini	(Switzerland) Kessel Racing	13	22		27	25		20	16		22	17	Ret					28	77
10	(Turkey) Salih Yoluc	Oman Racing Team with TF Sport									14	**9**	14	15					26	72
11	(France) Jean-Philippe Belloc (France) Christophe Bourret	(France) AKKA ASP	Ret	20		28	24		27	23					29	22	29	26		72
12	(Switzerland) Adrian Amstutz	(United Kingdom) Barwell Motorsport			23			20			12	42	30	Ret						62
13	(United Kingdom) Oliver Morley (Spain) Miguel Toril	(Germany) Black Falcon			19			Ret			20	14	12	12					30	62
14	(Germany) Nico Bastian	(France) AKKA ASP			17			**22**			15	56	50	Ret					21	60
15	(Russia) Rinat Salikhov	(Germany) Rinaldi Racing			16			EX			19	54	56	Ret			24	28	20	58
16	(Germany) Marvin Kirchhöfer	(Germany) Black Falcon										14	12	12					30	47
17	(Germany) Maximilian Götz	(Germany) Black Falcon										14	12	12						46
18	(United Kingdom) Euan Hankey	Oman Racing Team with TF Sport										**9**	14	15						40
19	(United Kingdom) Hunter Abbott	(Germany) HTP Motorsport						25												37
19	(United Kingdom) Hunter Abbott	(United Kingdom) Barwell Motorsport																	16	37
20	(Netherlands) Niek Hommerson (Belgium) Louis Machiels	(Switzerland) Spirit of Race			15			33			17	23	38	Ret					Ret	35
21	(Italy) Andrea Bertolini	(Switzerland) Spirit of Race			15						17	23	38	Ret					Ret	34
22	(Italy) Matteo Cressoni (Italy) Andrea Rizzoli	(Switzerland) Kessel Racing			8			44			**32**	22	17	Ret						30
23	(Italy) Matteo Malucelli	(Germany) Rinaldi Racing									19	54	56	Ret			24	28		28
24	(Monaco) Olivier Beretta (Italy) Lorenzo Bontempelli (Japan) Motoaki Ishikawa	(Italy) AF Corse			Ret			38			Ret	34	25	19					24	26
25	(Italy) Davide Rizzo (Finland) Toni Vilander	(China) BBT									Ret									25
25	(Italy) Davide Rizzo (Finland) Toni Vilander	(Switzerland) Spirit of Race										24	15	17						25
26	(Lebanon) Alex Demirdjian (France) Nicolas Minassian	(Switzerland) Spirit of Race										24	15	17						25
27	(Finland) Matias Henkola (Norway) Christian Krognes (Germany) Nico Menzel (Finland) Markus Palttala	(Germany) Walkenhorst Motorsport										21	23	20						21
28	(Republic of Ireland) Matt Griffin	(Germany) Black Falcon									20									21
28	(Republic of Ireland) Matt Griffin	(Italy) AF Corse										26	29	23						21
29	(Republic of Ireland) Damien Faulkner (United States) Mike Skeen	(Germany) HTP Motorsport			18			25												20
30	(United Kingdom) Richard Abra (Russia) Leo Machitski	(United Kingdom) Barwell Motorsport			Ret			26			24	57	49	Ret					27	20
31	(France) Tristan Vautier	(France) AKKA ASP															27	24		18
32	(France) Ludovic Badey (Switzerland) Daniele Perfetti	(France) AKKA ASP			Ret			32			Ret	56	50	Ret					21	17
33	(Monaco) Francesco Castellacci	(Italy) AF Corse										34	25	19						16
34	(Germany) Kenneth Heyer (Japan) Yoshiharu Mori	(Germany) Kornely Motorsport	24	23		WD	WD													14
35	(Portugal) Miguel Ramos	(United Kingdom) Barwell Motorsport			Ret			26			24	57	49	Ret						14
36	(United Kingdom) Lewis Williamson	(United Kingdom) Strakka Racing			Ret						38	28	48	Ret					22	12
37	(United Kingdom) Nick Leventis	(United Kingdom) Strakka Racing			WD						38	28	48	Ret					22	12
38	(Italy) David Fumanelli	(United Kingdom) Strakka Racing																	22	12
39	(Italy) Andrea Amici (Italy) Stefano Costantini (Denmark) Dennis Lind	(Italy) Raton Racing			20			27			37									12
40	(United Kingdom) Duncan Cameron (Italy) Riccardo Ragazzi (United Kingdom) Aaron Scott	(Italy) AF Corse										26	29	23						12
41	(Germany) Jürgen Häring (Germany) Alfred Renauer (Germany) Robert Renauer	(Germany) Herberth Motorsport			25			28			27	37	54	Ret					29	10
42	(Italy) Gian Maria Gabbiani	(Germany) HTP Motorsport			18															8
43	(Saudi Arabia) Abdulaziz Bin Turki Al Faisal (Germany) Hubert Haupt (Italy) Gabriele Piana (Netherlands) Renger van der Zande	(Germany) Black Falcon										19	45	Ret						7
44	(Switzerland) Daniel Allemann (Germany) Ralf Bohn (France) Mathieu Jaminet (Germany) Sven Müller	(Germany) Herberth Motorsport										36	37	29						7
45	(United States) Dore Chaponick Jr. (United States) Scott Heckert (United States) Brett Sandberg	(Germany) Black Falcon			Ret			40			22	27	47	Ret					38	6
46	(Netherlands) Jeroen Bleekemolen	(Germany) Black Falcon										27	47	Ret						6
46	(Netherlands) Jeroen Bleekemolen	(United Kingdom) Barwell Motorsport																	27	6
47	(Germany) Manuel Metzger	(Germany) Black Falcon			19			Ret												6
48	(United Kingdom) Rory Butcher	(Switzerland) Spirit of Race						33				23	38	Ret						5
49	(Netherlands) Max van Splunteren	(Germany) Attempto Racing			26			30			Ret								33	4
50	(France) Clément Mateu	(Germany) Attempto Racing			26			30			Ret									4
50	(France) Clément Mateu	(Belgium) Team WRT																	34	4
51	(Italy) Giorgio Maggi	(Germany) Attempto Racing			26			30			Ret									4
52	(United Kingdom) Josh Caygill (Australia) Jonathan Venter	(Belgium) Team WRT									25	25	42	Ret					34	4
53	(Switzerland) Alex Fontana	(France) AKKA ASP			Ret			32			Ret	56	50	Ret						2
54	(United Kingdom) Richard Lyons (Austria) Nikolaus Mayr-Melnhof	(Belgium) Team WRT										25	42	Ret						2
55	(United Kingdom) Oliver Gavin	(United Kingdom) Barwell Motorsport										42	30	Ret						2
56	(Switzerland) Hugo de Sadeleer	(Belgium) Team WRT									25									2
57	(Italy) Mauro Ricci	(France) AKKA ASP																	**36**	1
	(Andorra) Manel Cerqueda Diez (Spain) Isaac Tutumlu	(Germany) Attempto Racing																	33	0
	(United Kingdom) Craig Fleming	(United Kingdom) Strakka Racing			Ret						38	28	48	Ret						0
	(United Kingdom) Oliver Webb	(United Kingdom) Strakka Racing										28	48	Ret						0
	(Belgium) Christian Kelders (France) Marc Rostan	(France) Saintéloc Racing			Ret			36			Ret									0
	(Germany) Christopher Haase	(France) Saintéloc Racing			Ret			36												0
	(Germany) Marc Lieb	(Germany) Herberth Motorsport										37	54	Ret						0
	(Portugal) Rui Águas (Argentina) José Manuel Balbiani (Greece) Kriton Lendoudis	(Germany) Team Zakspeed			Ret			45												0
	(United Kingdom) Phil Keen	(United Kingdom) Barwell Motorsport										57	49	Ret						0
	(Austria) Norbert Siedler	(Germany) Rinaldi Racing										54	56	Ret						0
	(China) Anthony Liu	(China) BBT									Ret									
	(France) Grégory Guilvert	(France) Saintéloc Racing									Ret									
Pos.	Driver	Team	QR	MR	MNZ (Italy)	QR	MR	SIL (United Kingdom)	QR	MR	LEC (France)	6hrs	12hrs	24hrs	QR	MR	QR	MR	CAT (Spain)	Points
Pos.	Driver	Team	MIS (Italy)		MNZ (Italy)	BRH (United Kingdom)		SIL (United Kingdom)	ZOL (Belgium)		LEC (France)	SPA (Belgium)			HUN (Hungary)		NÜR (Germany)		CAT (Spain)	Points

==== Am Cup ====
Pos.	Driver	Team	MIS (Italy)		MNZ (Italy)	BRH (United Kingdom)		SIL (United Kingdom)	ZOL (Belgium)		LEC (France)	SPA (Belgium)			HUN (Hungary)		NÜR (Germany)		CAT (Spain)	Points
Pos.	Driver	Team	QR	MR	MNZ (Italy)	QR	MR	SIL (United Kingdom)	QR	MR	LEC (France)	6hrs	12hrs	24hrs	QR	MR	QR	MR	CAT (Spain)	Points
1	(South Africa) David Perel	(Switzerland) Kessel Racing			Ret			**39**	**30**	26	28	**29**	26	22	**30**	Ret	**28**	27	**39**	195
2	(Belgium) Jacques Duyver (Italy) Marco Zanuttini	(Switzerland) Kessel Racing			Ret			**39**			28	**29**	26	22					**39**	118
3	(Germany) Pierre Ehret (Italy) Rino Mastronardi	(Germany) Rinaldi Racing			**Ret**			35			**31**	39	28	25					32	107
4	(United States) Stephen Earle	(Switzerland) Kessel Racing							**30**	26					**30**	Ret	**28**	27		77
5	(Belgium) Bernard Delhez	(Austria) Team HB Racing			28			43			Ret	43	34	28					37	68
6	(Germany) Henry Walkenhorst	(Germany) Walkenhorst Motorsport						42			30	41	33	26					DNS	66
7	(Germany) David Schiwietz	(Germany) Walkenhorst Motorsport						42			30	41	33	26						66
8	(Belgium) Stef Van Campenhout	(Germany) Walkenhorst Motorsport									30	41	33	26						51
9	(Italy) Niki Cadei	(Switzerland) Kessel Racing										**29**	26	22						50
10	(France) Gilles Vannelet	(Austria) Team HB Racing			28			43			Ret	43	34	28						50
11	(France) Marc Rostan	(France) Saintéloc Racing										40	31	27						44
11	(France) Marc Rostan	(Austria) Team HB Racing																	37	44
12	(Belgium) Patrick Van Glabeke (Italy) Gabriele Lancieri	(Germany) Rinaldi Racing										39	28	25						36
13	(Germany) Mike Stursberg	(Austria) Team HB Racing						43			Ret	43	34	28						32
14	(Germany) Ralf Oeverhaus	(Germany) Walkenhorst Motorsport										41	33	26						27
15	(Belgium) Frédéric Bouvy (Belgium) Christian Kelders	(France) Saintéloc Racing										40	31	27						26
16	(Lebanon) Alex Demirdjian (United Kingdom) Abbie Eaton (Italy) Davide Rizzo	(Italy) AF Corse			27															25
17	(Finland) Rory Penttinen	(Germany) Rinaldi Racing									**31**									20
18	(Switzerland) Christopher Zanella	(Austria) Team HB Racing										43	34	28						20
19	(Germany) Edward Lewis Brauner	(Austria) Team HB Racing																	37	18
20	(Belgium) Sarah Bovy (Germany) Jürgen Krebs (Italy) Giorgio Maggi (France) Clément Mateu	(Germany) Attempto Racing										45	35	31						16
21	(Finland) Matias Henkola	(Germany) Walkenhorst Motorsport						42											DNS	15
22	(United Kingdom) Chris Goodwin (United Kingdom) Chris Harris (Sweden) Alexander West	(United Kingdom) Garage 59						Ret				52	41	32						12
23	(United Kingdom) Bradley Ellis	(United Kingdom) Garage 59										52	41	32						12
	(Italy) Beniamino Caccia (Germany) Jörg Viebahn (Germany) Immanuel Vinke	(Germany) Team Zakspeed						Ret												
	(United States) Ace Robey	(Germany) Walkenhorst Motorsport																	DNS	
Pos.	Driver	Team	QR	MR	MNZ (Italy)	QR	MR	SIL (United Kingdom)	QR	MR	LEC (France)	6hrs	12hrs	24hrs	QR	MR	QR	MR	CAT (Spain)	Points
Pos.	Driver	Team	MIS (Italy)		MNZ (Italy)	BRH (United Kingdom)		SIL (United Kingdom)	ZOL (Belgium)		LEC (France)	SPA (Belgium)			HUN (Hungary)		NÜR (Germany)		CAT (Spain)	Points

=== Teams' championships ===
==== Overall ====
Pos.	Team	Manufacturer	MIS (Italy)		MNZ (Italy)	BRH (United Kingdom)		SIL (United Kingdom)	ZOL (Belgium)		LEC (France)	SPA (Belgium)			HUN (Hungary)		NÜR (Germany)		CAT (Spain)	Points
Pos.	Team	Manufacturer	QR	MR	MNZ (Italy)	QR	MR	SIL (United Kingdom)	QR	MR	LEC (France)	6hrs	12hrs	24hrs	QR	MR	QR	MR	CAT (Spain)	Points
1	(Austria) GRT Grasser Racing Team	Lamborghini	8	9	1	**1**	1	1	7	10	13	2	1	Ret	2	3	2	3	3	178
2	(Germany) (MANN-FILTER/Mercedes-AMG Team) HTP Motorsport	Mercedes-Benz	1	1	3	16	6	2	8	6	18	3	2	7	4	6	1	6	4	160
3	(Belgium) Audi Sport/Belgian Audi Club Team WRT	Audi	6	11	Ret	11	3	Ret	3	1	3	4	8	5	**1**	1	**3**	2	9	154
4	(United Kingdom) Bentley Team M-Sport	Bentley	4	2	6	20	12	5	12	5	1	5	5	2	6	25	4	7	19	136
5	(France) (Mercedes-AMG Team) AKKA ASP	Mercedes-Benz	3	4	17	4	7	**3**	2	22	4	10	4	3	9	12	13	14	1	129
6	(Belgium) Team WRT	Audi	12	10	12	7	2	13	**1**	3	6	25	42	Ret	3	2	6	1	**2**	127
7	(Germany) Rowe Racing	BMW	11	6		2	4	7	14	12	Ret	15	6	10	12	11	7	4	12	70
8	(Russia) SMP Racing	Ferrari			5			4			2	51	36	24					Ret	48
9	(Italy) AF Corse/Kaspersky Motorsport	Ferrari	Ret	DNS	**2**	25	19	6	25	17	23	**1**	3	19	22	19	DNS	DNS	15	48
10	(Czech Republic) ISR	Audi	10	15	29	10	Ret	Ret	4	2	7	59	59	Ret	17	14	Ret	Ret	8	37
11	(France) Saintéloc Racing	Audi	7	5	Ret	Ret	8	36	31	14	9	40	31	27	10	9	20	22	17	35
12	(United Kingdom) Strakka Motorsport/Racing	McLaren	18	8	9	6	10	8	10	11	16	28	44	Ret	20	17	8	8	14	33
13	(Germany) (Mercedes-AMG Team) Black Falcon	Mercedes-Benz			10			40			**20**	13	7	8					5	28
14	(Germany) Attempto Racing	Lamborghini; Porsche	**23**	27	26	9	13	19	9	7	Ret	45	35	31	16	10	21	Ret	33	18
15	(United Kingdom) Motul Team RJN Motorsport/Nissan	Nissan			13			16			5	17	16	13					13	17
16	Oman Racing Team with TF Sport	Aston Martin			7			21			14	9	14	15					26	17
17	(United Kingdom) Strakka Motorsport (Note: Only Sprint Cup drivers entering with Strakka Motorsport scored points for Strakka Motorsport. Endurance Cup drivers entering with Strakka Motorsport scored points for Strakka Motorsport/Racing.)	McLaren	19	13		14	11		11	18					25	Ret	17	13		7
18	(Switzerland) Kessel Racing (TP12)	Ferrari	13	19	8	26	20	39	18	16	28	22	17	22	19	16	26	20	28	6
19	(Switzerland) Emil Frey Jaguar/Lexus Racing	Jaguar; Lexus			31			10			34	46	55	Ret			22	21	10	6
20	(United Kingdom) Barwell Motorsport	Lamborghini			23			20			12	42	30	Ret					16	2
21	(Italy) Ombra Racing	Lamborghini			22			15			Ret	35	24	16					23	2
22	(Germany) Rinaldi Racing	Ferrari	25	14	16	19	16	35	19	27	19	39	28	25	18	15	18	18	20	2
	(Italy) Orange 1 Team Lazarus	Lamborghini	15	17	21	21	15	14	29	Ret	21	30	20	21	23	23	25	23	25	0
	(Switzerland) Spirit of Race	Ferrari			15			33			17	23	15	17					Ret	0
	(Germany) Walkenhorst Motorsport	BMW			Ret			18			26	21	23	20					Ret	0
	(Italy) Raton Racing	Lamborghini			20			27			37									0
	(Germany) Reiter Young Stars	Lamborghini	26	21		WD	WD				Ret								35	0
	(Germany) Kornely Motorsport	Mercedes-Benz	24	23		WD	WD													0
	(Germany) Herberth Motorsport	Porsche			25			28			27	36	37	29					29	0
	(Austria) Team HB Racing	Lamborghini			28			43			Ret	43	34	28					37	0
	(United Kingdom) Garage 59	McLaren						Ret				52	41	32						0
	(Japan) Good Smile Racing with Team UKYO	Mercedes-Benz										32	43	Ret						0
	(Germany) Team Zakspeed	Mercedes-Benz			32			45												0
	(China) BBT	Ferrari									Ret									
Teams ineligible to score points
	(France) Audi Sport Team Saintéloc	Audi										7	13	1						
	(Germany) KÜS TEAM75 Bernhard	Porsche										20	11	4						
	(Czech Republic) Audi Sport Team ISR	Audi										8	9	9						
	(Germany) Bentley Team ABT	Bentley										16	18	Ret						
	(Belgium) SpeedLover	Porsche										49	40	34						
	(France) RMS	Porsche										53	53	Ret						
Pos.	Driver	Team	QR	MR	MNZ (Italy)	QR	MR	SIL (United Kingdom)	QR	MR	LEC (France)	6hrs	12hrs	24hrs	QR	MR	QR	MR	CAT (Spain)	Points
Pos.	Driver	Team	MIS (Italy)		MNZ (Italy)	BRH (United Kingdom)		SIL (United Kingdom)	ZOL (Belgium)		LEC (France)	SPA (Belgium)			HUN (Hungary)		NÜR (Germany)		CAT (Spain)	Points

==== Pro-Am Cup ====
Pos.	Team	Manufacturer	MIS (Italy)		MNZ (Italy)	BRH (United Kingdom)		SIL (United Kingdom)	ZOL (Belgium)		LEC (France)	SPA (Belgium)			HUN (Hungary)		NÜR (Germany)		CAT (Spain)	Points
Pos.	Team	Manufacturer	QR	MR	MNZ (Italy)	QR	MR	SIL (United Kingdom)	QR	MR	LEC (France)	6hrs	12hrs	24hrs	QR	MR	QR	MR	CAT (Spain)	Points
1	(Germany) Rinaldi Racing	Ferrari	25	14	16	19	16	EX	19	27	19	54	56	Ret	18	15	**18**	18	20	192
2	(Switzerland) Kessel Racing (TP12)	Ferrari	13	19	8	26	20	44	**18**	16	**32**	22	17	Ret	19	16	26	20	28	169
3	(France) AKKA ASP	Mercedes-Benz	**Ret**	20	17	**22**	23	**22**	23	22	15	56	50	Ret	**27**	21	27	24	**21**	160
4	Oman Racing Team with TF Sport	Aston Martin			**7**			21			14	**9**	14	15					26	116
5	(United Kingdom) Barwell Motorsport	Lamborghini			23			20			12	42	30	Ret					16	88
6	(Germany) Black Falcon	Mercedes-Benz			19			40			20	14	12	12					30	63
7	(Switzerland) Spirit of Race	Ferrari			15			33			17	23	15	17					Ret	61
8	(Italy) AF Corse	Ferrari			Ret			38			Ret	26	25	19					24	30
9	(Germany) Herberth Motorsport	Porsche			25			28			27	36	37	29					29	28
10	(Germany) Walkenhorst Motorsport	BMW										21	23	20						22
11	(Germany) HTP Motorsport	Mercedes-Benz			18			25												20
12	(Germany) Kornely Motorsport	Mercedes-Benz	24	23		WD	WD													18
13	(Italy) Raton Racing	Lamborghini			20			27			37									15
14	(United Kingdom) Strakka Racing	McLaren			Ret						38	28	48	Ret					22	14
15	(Belgium) Team WRT	Audi									25	25	42	Ret					34	11
16	(Germany) Attempto Racing	Lamborghini			26			30			Ret								33	7
17	(France) Saintéloc Racing	Audi			Ret			36			Ret									2
	(Germany) Team Zakspeed	Mercedes-Benz			Ret			45												0
	(China) BBT	Ferrari									Ret									
Pos.	Driver	Team	QR	MR	MNZ (Italy)	QR	MR	SIL (United Kingdom)	QR	MR	LEC (France)	6hrs	12hrs	24hrs	QR	MR	QR	MR	CAT (Spain)	Points
Pos.	Driver	Team	MIS (Italy)		MNZ (Italy)	BRH (United Kingdom)		SIL (United Kingdom)	ZOL (Belgium)		LEC (France)	SPA (Belgium)			HUN (Hungary)		NÜR (Germany)		CAT (Spain)	Points

==== Am Cup ====
Pos.	Team	Manufacturer	MIS (Italy)		MNZ (Italy)	BRH (United Kingdom)		SIL (United Kingdom)	ZOL (Belgium)		LEC (France)	SPA (Belgium)			HUN (Hungary)		NÜR (Germany)		CAT (Spain)	Points
Pos.	Team	Manufacturer	QR	MR	MNZ (Italy)	QR	MR	SIL (United Kingdom)	QR	MR	LEC (France)	6hrs	12hrs	24hrs	QR	MR	QR	MR	CAT (Spain)	Points
1	(Switzerland) Kessel Racing	Ferrari			Ret			**39**	**30**	26	28	**29**	26	22	**30**	Ret	**28**	27	**39**	195
2	(Germany) Rinaldi Racing	Ferrari			**Ret**			35			**31**	39	28	25					32	107
3	(Austria) Team HB Racing	Lamborghini			28			43			Ret	43	34	28					37	68
3	(Germany) Walkenhorst Motorsport	BMW						42			30	41	33	26					DNS	66
5	(France) Saintéloc Racing	Audi										40	31	27						26
6	(Italy) AF Corse	Ferrari			27															25
7	(Germany) Attempto Racing	Lamborghini										45	35	31						16
8	(United Kingdom) Garage 59	McLaren						Ret				52	41	32						12
	(Germany) Team Zakspeed	Mercedes-Benz						Ret												
Pos.	Driver	Team	QR	MR	MNZ (Italy)	QR	MR	SIL (United Kingdom)	QR	MR	LEC (France)	6hrs	12hrs	24hrs	QR	MR	QR	MR	CAT (Spain)	Points
Pos.	Driver	Team	MIS (Italy)		MNZ (Italy)	BRH (United Kingdom)		SIL (United Kingdom)	ZOL (Belgium)		LEC (France)	SPA (Belgium)			HUN (Hungary)		NÜR (Germany)		CAT (Spain)	Points

== See also ==
- 2017 Blancpain GT Series Endurance Cup
- 2017 Blancpain GT Series Sprint Cup
- 2017 Blancpain GT Series Asia
