= 2023 ADAC GT Masters =

Motor racing competition

The 2023 ADAC GT Masters is the seventeenth season of the ADAC GT Masters, the grand tourer-style sports car racing series founded by the German automobile club ADAC.

Prior to the season, the ADAC had initially confirmed that the series was set to pivot to a new formula. Dubbed DTM Endurance, the championship would become a support series for the DTM and feature both GT3 and LMP3 machinery, merging with the Prototype Cup Germany. The series was also set to forbid the presence of FIA Platinum-ranked drivers. While these plans were scrapped following backlash from teams, the series would require teams to field an FIA Silver or Bronze-rated driver in each driver lineup.

== Calendar ==
Round	Circuit	Location	Race 1	Race 2
1	(Germany) Hockenheimring	Hockenheim, Baden-Württemberg	9 June	11 June
2	(Germany) Norisring	Nuremberg, Bavaria	8 July	9 July
3	(Germany) Nürburgring (Sprint Circuit)	Nürburg, Rhineland-Palatinate	15 July	16 July
4	(Germany) Sachsenring	Hohenstein-Ernstthal, Saxony	9 September	10 September
5	(Austria) Red Bull Ring	Spielberg, Styria	23 September	24 September
6	(Germany) Hockenheimring	Hockenheim, Baden-Württemberg	21 October	22 October

== Entry list ==
Team	Car	No.	Driver	Class	Rounds
(Germany) Haupt Racing Team	Mercedes-AMG GT3 Evo	2	(Estonia) Ralf Aron		All
(Germany) Haupt Racing Team	Mercedes-AMG GT3 Evo	2	(Switzerland) Alain Valente		All
(Germany) Haupt Racing Team	Mercedes-AMG GT3 Evo	3	(Romania) Petru Umbrărescu		All
(Germany) Haupt Racing Team	Mercedes-AMG GT3 Evo	3	(India) Arjun Maini		1, 3
(Germany) Haupt Racing Team	Mercedes-AMG GT3 Evo	3	(Germany) Maximilian Götz		2, 4, 6
(Germany) Haupt Racing Team	Mercedes-AMG GT3 Evo	3	(Switzerland) Philip Ellis		5
(Germany) Liqui Moly Team Engstler	Audi R8 LMS Evo II	7	(South Africa) Kwanda Mokoena	J	1–3
(Germany) Liqui Moly Team Engstler	Audi R8 LMS Evo II	7	(Macau) Dylan Yip	J	1–3
(Germany) Liqui Moly Team Engstler	Audi R8 LMS Evo II	7	(Lithuania) Jonas Karklys		5–6
(Germany) Liqui Moly Team Engstler	Audi R8 LMS Evo II	7	(United States) John Paul Southern Jr.	J	5–6
(Germany) FK Performance Motorsport	BMW M4 GT3	10	(Germany) Kim-Luis Schramm		1–3
(Germany) FK Performance Motorsport	BMW M4 GT3	10	(Poland) Igor Waliłko		1–2
(Germany) FK Performance Motorsport	BMW M4 GT3	10	(United States) Neil Verhagen		3
(Germany) FK Performance Motorsport	BMW M4 GT3	10	(Netherlands) Maxime Oosten	J	5
(Germany) FK Performance Motorsport	BMW M4 GT3	10	(Canada) Bruno Spengler		5
(Germany) Schnitzelalm Racing	Mercedes-AMG GT3 Evo	11	(Germany) Marcel Marchewicz		3, 6
(Germany) Schnitzelalm Racing	Mercedes-AMG GT3 Evo	11	(Netherlands) Colin Caresani	J	3
(Germany) Schnitzelalm Racing	Mercedes-AMG GT3 Evo	11	(Germany) Moritz Wiskirchen	J	6
(Germany) Schnitzelalm Racing	Mercedes-AMG GT3 Evo	99	(Germany) Luca Arnold	J	6
(Germany) Schnitzelalm Racing	Mercedes-AMG GT3 Evo	99	(Germany) Christer Jöns	T	6
(Germany) Team Joos by RACEmotion	Porsche 911 GT3 R (992)	19	(Germany) Michael Joos		5–6
(Germany) Team Joos by RACEmotion	Porsche 911 GT3 R (992)	19	(Germany) Christian Engelhart		5
(Germany) Team Joos by RACEmotion	Porsche 911 GT3 R (992)	19	(Germany) Nico Bastian		6
(Germany) Team Joos by RACEmotion	Porsche 911 GT3 R (992)	91	(Germany) Finn Gehrsitz	J	All
(Germany) Team Joos by RACEmotion	Porsche 911 GT3 R (992)	91	(Germany) Sven Müller		All
(Germany) Schubert Motorsport	BMW M4 GT3	20	(Philippines) Eduardo Coseteng	J	All
(Germany) Schubert Motorsport	BMW M4 GT3	20	(United Kingdom) Ben Green		All
(Lithuania) NordPass by Juta Racing	Audi R8 LMS Evo II	23	(Lithuania) Justas Jonušis	J	3
(Lithuania) NordPass by Juta Racing	Audi R8 LMS Evo II	23	(Lithuania) Simas Juodviršis		3
(Lithuania) NordPass by Juta Racing	Audi R8 LMS Evo II	24	(Lithuania) Jonas Gelžinis		1, 3–4
(Lithuania) NordPass by Juta Racing	Audi R8 LMS Evo II	24	(Lithuania) Jonas Karklys		1, 3–4
(Germany) Huber Motorsport	Porsche 911 GT3 R (992)	25	(Germany) Jannes Fittje	J	All
(Germany) Huber Motorsport	Porsche 911 GT3 R (992)	25	(Germany) Nico Menzel		All
(Germany) Landgraf Motorsport	Mercedes-AMG GT3 Evo	48	(Germany) Salman Owega	J	All
(Germany) Landgraf Motorsport	Mercedes-AMG GT3 Evo	48	(Finland) Elias Seppänen	J	All
(Germany) Project 1	BMW M4 GT3	56	(Germany) Sandro Holzem	J	3
(Germany) Project 1	BMW M4 GT3	56	(Germany) Marco Wittmann		3
(Austria) GRT Grasser Racing Team	Lamborghini Huracán GT3 Evo 2	63	(Chile) Benjamín Hites	J	All
(Austria) GRT Grasser Racing Team	Lamborghini Huracán GT3 Evo 2	63	(Italy) Marco Mapelli		All
(Germany) Paul Motorsport	Lamborghini Huracán GT3 Evo 2	71	(Germany) Maximilian Paul	J	3
(Germany) Paul Motorsport	Lamborghini Huracán GT3 Evo 2	71	(Germany) Simon Connor Primm	J	3
(Germany) Huber Racing	Porsche 911 GT3 R (992)	92	(New Zealand) Jaxon Evans		1–3
(Germany) Huber Racing	Porsche 911 GT3 R (992)	92	(Germany) Tim Zimmermann		1–3

Icon	Legend
J	Junior
T	Trophy

== Results ==
Rnd.	Race	Circuit	Date	Pole position	Race winner
1	1	(Germany) Hockenheimring	10 June	(Austria) #63 GRT Grasser Racing Team	(Germany) #92 Huber Racing
1	1	(Germany) Hockenheimring	10 June	(Chile) Benjamín Hites (Italy) Marco Mapelli	(New Zealand) Jaxon Evans (Germany) Tim Zimmermann
1	2	(Germany) Hockenheimring	11 June	(Germany) #3 Haupt Racing Team	(Germany) #91 Team Joos by RACEmotion
1	2	(Germany) Hockenheimring	11 June	(India) Arjun Maini (Romania) Petru Umbrărescu	(Germany) Finn Gehrsitz (Germany) Sven Müller
2	1	(Germany) Norisring	8 July	(Germany) #48 Landgraf Motorsport	(Germany) #48 Landgraf Motorsport
2	1	(Germany) Norisring	8 July	(Germany) Salman Owega (Finland) Elias Seppänen	(Germany) Salman Owega (Finland) Elias Seppänen
2	2	(Germany) Norisring	9 July	(Germany) #25 Huber Motorsport	(Germany) #25 Huber Motorsport
2	2	(Germany) Norisring	9 July	(Germany) Jannes Fittje (Germany) Nico Menzel	(Germany) Jannes Fittje (Germany) Nico Menzel
3	1	(Germany) Nürburgring	15 July	(Germany) #92 Huber Racing	(Germany) #48 Landgraf Motorsport
3	1	(Germany) Nürburgring	15 July	(New Zealand) Jaxon Evans (Germany) Tim Zimmermann	(Germany) Salman Owega (Finland) Elias Seppänen
3	2	(Germany) Nürburgring	16 July	(Austria) #63 GRT Grasser Racing Team	(Austria) #63 GRT Grasser Racing Team
3	2	(Germany) Nürburgring	16 July	(Chile) Benjamín Hites (Italy) Marco Mapelli	(Chile) Benjamín Hites (Italy) Marco Mapelli
4	1	(Germany) Sachsenring	9 September	(Germany) #48 Landgraf Motorsport	(Germany) #48 Landgraf Motorsport
4	1	(Germany) Sachsenring	9 September	(Germany) Salman Owega (Finland) Elias Seppänen	(Germany) Salman Owega (Finland) Elias Seppänen
4	2	(Germany) Sachsenring	10 September	(Austria) #63 GRT Grasser Racing Team	(Germany) #48 Landgraf Motorsport
4	2	(Germany) Sachsenring	10 September	(Chile) Benjamín Hites (Italy) Marco Mapelli	(Germany) Salman Owega (Finland) Elias Seppänen
5	1	(Austria) Red Bull Ring	23 September	(Austria) #63 GRT Grasser Racing Team	(Germany) #10 FK Performance Motorsport
5	1	(Austria) Red Bull Ring	23 September	(Chile) Benjamín Hites (Italy) Marco Mapelli	(Netherlands) Maxime Oosten (Canada) Bruno Spengler
5	2	(Austria) Red Bull Ring	24 September	(Germany) #19 Team Joos by RACEmotion	(Germany) #19 Team Joos by RACEmotion
5	2	(Austria) Red Bull Ring	24 September	(Germany) Christian Engelhart (Germany) Michael Joos	(Germany) Christian Engelhart (Germany) Michael Joos
6	1	(Germany) Hockenheimring	21 October	(Austria) #63 GRT Grasser Racing Team	(Austria) #63 GRT Grasser Racing Team
6	1	(Germany) Hockenheimring	21 October	(Chile) Benjamín Hites (Italy) Marco Mapelli	(Chile) Benjamín Hites (Italy) Marco Mapelli
6	2	(Germany) Hockenheimring	22 October	(Germany) #2 Haupt Racing Team	(Germany) #2 Haupt Racing Team
6	2	(Germany) Hockenheimring	22 October	(Estonia) Ralf Aron (Switzerland) Alain Valente	(Estonia) Ralf Aron (Switzerland) Alain Valente

== Championship standings ==
Scoring system

Championship points are awarded for the first fifteen positions in each race. Entries are required to complete 75% of the winning car's race distance in order to be classified and earn points. Individual drivers are required to participate for a minimum of 25 minutes in order to earn championship points in any race.

Position	**1st**	**2nd**	**3rd**	**4th**	**5th**	**6th**	**7th**	**8th**	**9th**	**10th**	**11th**	**12th**	**13th**	**14th**	**15th**
Points	25	20	16	13	11	10	9	8	7	6	5	4	3	2	1
Qualifying	3	2	1												

=== Drivers' championships ===
==== Overall ====
Pos.	Driver	Team	HOC (Germany)		NOR (Germany)		NÜR (Germany)		SAC (Germany)		RBR (Austria)		HOC (Germany)		Points
1	(Germany) Salman Owega (Finland) Elias Seppänen	(Germany) Landgraf Motorsport	Ret^{3}	3^{2}	**1**^{1}	4	1^{2}	8	**1**^{1}	1	DSQ	6	9	3	181
2	(Estonia) Ralf Aron (Switzerland) Alain Valente	(Germany) Haupt Racing Team	7	9	4	5	2	10	4	3^{3}	4^{2}	7	2^{2}	**1**^{1}	170
3	(Germany) Jannes Fittje (Germany) Nico Menzel	(Germany) Huber Motorsport	3	6	2^{2}	**1**^{1}	9	11	8^{3}†	7	3	4	3^{3}	4	165
4	(Chile) Benjamín Hites (Italy) Marco Mapelli	(Austria) GRT Grasser Racing Team	**8**^{1}	7	5^{3}	6	6	**1**^{1}	7^{2}†	**2**^{1}	**DSQ**^{1}	8^{2}	**1**^{1}	Ret^{2}	157
5	(Germany) Finn Gehrsitz (Germany) Sven Müller	(Germany) Team Joos by RACEmotion	5	1^{3}	3	2^{2}	10	3^{3}	5	8	Ret	2^{3}	4	Ret	151
6	(Romania) Petru Umbrărescu	(Germany) Haupt Racing Team	6	**2**^{1}	6	7	12	12	3	6^{2}	6	3	8	2	142
7	(Philippines) Eduardo Coseteng (United Kingdom) Ben Green	(Germany) Schubert Motorsport	2	4	9	9	8	6^{2}	2	4	2	9	7	Ret	136
8	(New Zealand) Jaxon Evans (Germany) Tim Zimmermann	(Germany) Huber Racing	1^{2}	5	7	3^{3}	**5**^{1}	4							91
9	(Germany) Maximilian Götz	(Germany) Haupt Racing Team			6	7			3	6^{2}			8	2	75
10	(Lithuania) Jonas Karklys	(Lithuania) NordPass by Juta Racing	9	11			14	14	6	5					72
10	(Lithuania) Jonas Karklys	(Germany) Liqui Moly Team Engstler									7	5	11	6	72
11	(Germany) Kim-Luis Schramm	(Germany) FK Performance Motorsport	4	8	8	8	7	9							53
12	(Germany) Michael Joos	(Germany) Team Joos by RACEmotion									5^{3}	**1**^{1}	10	Ret^{2}	47
13	(India) Arjun Maini	(Germany) Haupt Racing Team	6	**2**^{1}			12	12							41
14	(Germany) Christian Engelhart	(Germany) Team Joos by RACEmotion									5^{3}	**1**^{1}			40
15	(Poland) Igor Waliłko	(Germany) FK Performance Motorsport	4	8	8	8									37
16	(Germany) Marcel Marchewicz	(Germany) Schnitzelalm Racing					11	5					6	5	37
17	(Lithuania) Jonas Gelžinis	(Lithuania) NordPass by Juta Racing	9	11			14	14	6	5					37
18	(United States) John Paul Southern	(Germany) Liqui Moly Team Engstler									7	5	11	6	35
19	(Germany) Sandro Holzem (Germany) Marco Wittmann	(Germany) Project 1					4	2							33
20	(Netherlands) Maxime Oosten (Canada) Bruno Spengler	(Germany) FK Performance Motorsport									1	10			31
21	(South Africa) Kwanda Mokoena (Macau) Dylan Yip	(Germany) Liqui Moly Team Engstler	10	10	10	10	13	13							30
22	(Switzerland) Philip Ellis	(Germany) Haupt Racing Team									6	3			26
23	(Germany) Maximilian Paul (Germany) Simon Connor Primm	(Germany) Paul Motorsport					3^{3}	7							26
24	(Germany) Moritz Wiskirchen	(Germany) Schnitzelalm Racing											6	5	21
25	(Germany) Christer Jöns (Germany) Luca Arnold	(Germany) Schnitzelalm Racing											5	7	20
26	(Netherlands) Colin Caresani	(Germany) Schnitzelalm Racing					11	5							16
27	(United States) Neil Verhagen	(Germany) FK Performance Motorsport					7	9							16
28	(Germany) Nico Bastian	(Germany) Team Joos by RACEmotion											10	Ret^{2}	7
29	(Lithuania) Justas Jonušis (Lithuania) Simas Juodviršis	(Lithuania) NordPass by Juta Racing					Ret	15							1
Pos.	Driver	Team	HOC (Germany)		NOR (Germany)		NÜR (Germany)		SAC (Germany)		RBR (Austria)		HOC (Germany)		Points

Key
Colour	Result
Gold	Race winner
Silver	2nd place
Bronze	3rd place
Green	Points finish
Blue	Non-points finish
Blue	Non-classified finish (NC)
Purple	Did not finish (Ret)
Black	Disqualified (DSQ)
Black	Excluded (EX)
White	Did not start (DNS)
White	Race cancelled (C)
White	Withdrew (WD)
Blank	Did not participate

**Bold** – Pole
Italics – Fastest Lap

**^{1}** – 3 Points for Pole

**^{2}** – 2 Points for P2

**^{3}** – 1 Point for P3

=== Teams' standings ===
Pos.	Team	Points
1	(Germany) Haupt Racing Team	190
2	(Germany) Landgraf Motorsport	177
3	(Germany) Huber Motorsport	166
4	(Germany) Team Joos by RACEmotion	165
5	(Austria) GRT Grasser Racing Team	139
6	(Germany) Schubert Motorsport	139
7	(Germany) FK Performance Motorsport	88
8	(Germany) Huber Racing	86
9	(Germany) Liqui Moly Team Engstler	78
10	(Lithuania) NordPass by Juta Racing	42
11	(Germany) Schnitzelalm Racing	40
12	(Germany) Project 1	33
13	(Germany) Paul Motorsport	25
