= Finn Gehrsitz =

German racing driver (born 2004)

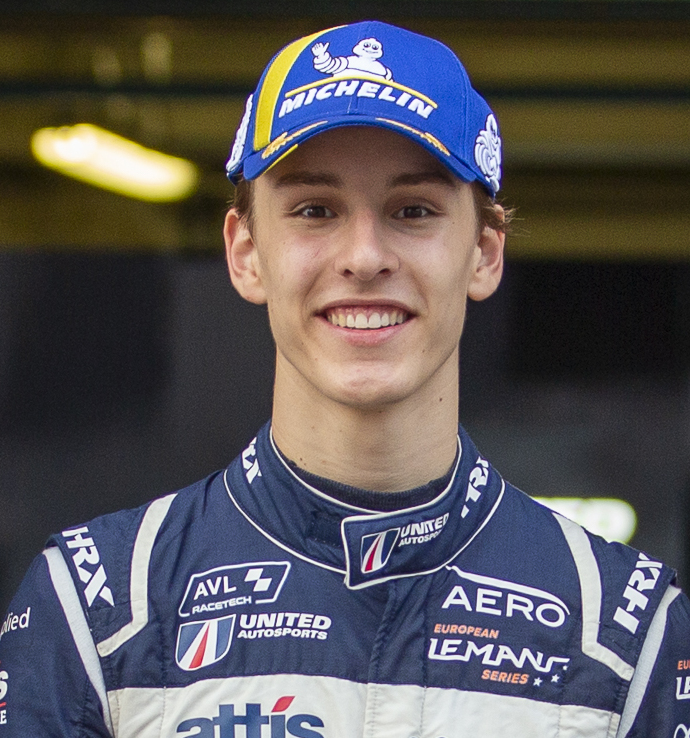
- Gehrsitz in 2022
- Nationality: (Germany) German
- Born: 25 September 2004 (age 22) Stuttgart, Germany

FIA World Endurance Championship career
- Debut season: 2025
- Current team: Garage 59
- Categorisation: FIA Bronze (2020–2021); FIA Silver (2022–)
- Car number: 58
- Co-driver: Benjamin Goethe and Alexander West
- Former teams: Akkodis ASP Team
- Starts: 8
- Wins: 0
- Podiums: 1
- Poles: 2
- Fastest laps: 0

Previous series
- 2024 2023 2022 2021-22 2021: GT World Challenge Asia; ADAC GT Masters; Asian Le Mans Series; European Le Mans Series; Le Mans Cup

Finn Gehrsitz (born 25 September 2004) is a German racing driver who is currently competing in the FIA World Endurance Championship with Garage 59. He previously drove for Akkodis ASP Team.

== Career ==
=== 2020 ===
Having been slated to make his car racing debut in the Lamera Cup at Misano in 2020, Gehrsitz instead debuted in the Porsche Super Sports Cup at the Hockenheimring owing to the effects of the COVID-19 pandemic on the racing schedule. He started his career out in brilliant fashion, winning his first two races in GT4 machinery. At the GTC Finale held at the same circuit in November, Gehrsitz finished the endurance race in third, before being disqualified for an operational error, before winning the sprint race.

=== 2021 ===
For the 2021 season, Gehrsitz would move to compete in the Michelin Le Mans Cup, driving in the LMP3 category for Phoenix Racing. Partnering Hamza Owega, the German would qualify second for the opening two races, scoring a seventh and fourth place in the races, before taking his first pole position at Monza. He made good use of his grid spot, remaining in first before handing over the car to Owega at the midway point of the race, before their car suffered a mechanical issue, forcing them to retire. Another pole followed at the penultimate round in Spa-Francorchamps, where the team finished fourth, before Gehrsitz missed the season finale, meaning he dropped to ninth in the standings by season's end.

At the end of the year, Gehrsitz made his debut in the European Le Mans Series, driving for Eurointernational in the season finale at Portimão.

=== 2022 ===
Gehrsitz competed in the Asian Le Mans Series at the start of 2022. Driving alongside Jürgen Häring and Marco Seefried in the GT-Am class, the team took four podiums and ended up third in the championship.

Gehrsitz's main campaign would lie in the European Le Mans Series, where he raced for United Autosports in the LMP3 class alongside Bailey Voisin and Josh Caygill. His season started out strongly, as, having run first during his stint, teammate Caygill finished the race in Le Castellet in third, which turned into second once a car ahead had been disqualified. The following rounds would bring less success however, as two retirements sandwiched a fifth and ninth place. At the season finale in the Algarve, Gehrsitz and his teammates took another podium finish, leading them to take eighth in the drivers' standings.

Following the end of the campaign, Gehrsitz was selected as one of the designated Rookie Test drivers for the post-season rookie test in the World Endurance Championship. The German drove in the LMGTE - Am category.

=== 2023 ===
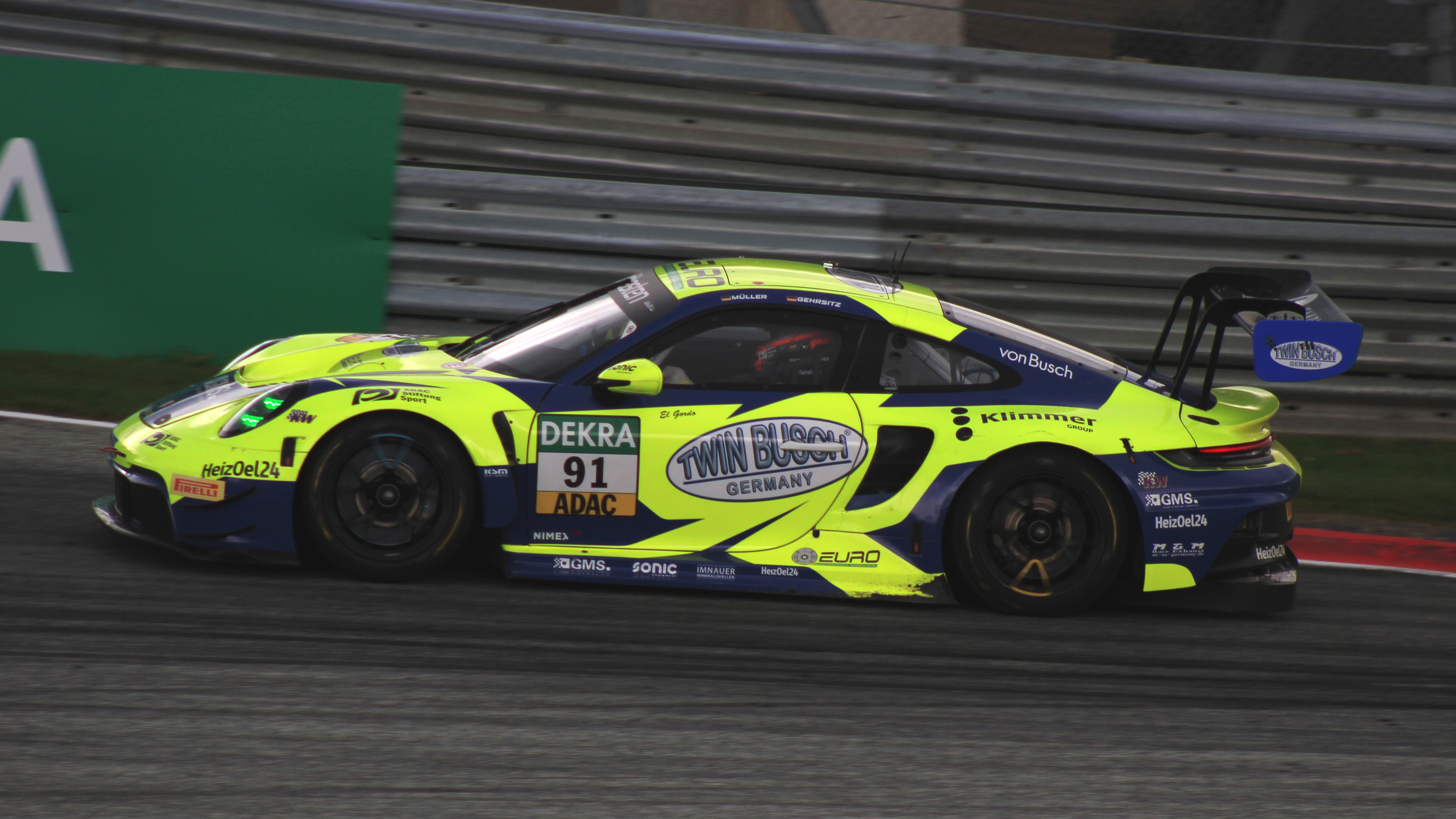
The No. 91 Porsche 911 GT3 R (992) that Gehrsitz drove in Red Bull Ring

The 2023 season saw Gehrsitz switch back to the world of GT racing, where he teamed up with Porsche works driver Sven Müller at Team Joos Sportwagentechnik in the ADAC GT Masters.

== Personal life ==
Gehrsitz is mentored by Ellen Lohr, the only woman to ever win a race in the DTM.

== Karting record ==
=== Karting career summary ===
Season	Series	Team	Position
2014	Baden-Württemberg Kart-Cup — Rotax Micro	RMSV Urloffen-Flandria Germany	1st
2014	Rotax Max Challenge Germany — Micro		5th
2015	Baden-Württemberg Kart-Cup — Rotax Mini	Flandria Kart Germany RMSV URLO	1st
2016	Rotax Max Challenge Germany — Mini Max		2nd
2017	Rotax Max Challenge Germany — Junior		6th
2018	Rotax Max Challenge Euro Trophy — Junior		14th
2019	Deutsche Elektro-Kart-Meisterschaft (DEKM)		2nd

== Racing record ==
=== Racing career summary ===
Season	Series	Team	Races	Wins	Poles	F/Laps	Podiums	Points	Position
2020	Porsche Super Sports Cup - GT4	Mühlner Motorsport	2	2	2	?	2	0	NC
2021	Le Mans Cup - LMP3	Phoenix Racing	6	0	2	0	0	37.5	9th
2021	European Le Mans Series - LMP3	Eurointernational	1	0	0	0	0	4	35th
2022	European Le Mans Series - LMP3	United Autosports	6	0	0	0	2	48	7th
2022	Asian Le Mans Series - GT Am	Herberth Motorsport	4	0	0	0	4	60	**3rd**
2023	ADAC GT Masters	Team Joos by RACEmotion	12	1	0	2	5	151	5th
2023-24	Middle East Trophy - GT3	Huber Motorsport	1	0	0	0	0	0	9th
2024	GT World Challenge Asia	Absolute Corse	12	0	0	?	0	16	31st
2025	FIA World Endurance Championship - LMGT3	Akkodis ASP Team	8	0	2	0	1	51	9th
2026	FIA World Endurance Championship - LMGT3	Garage 59	8	0	0	0	0	22	19th

^{*} Season still in progress.

=== Complete Le Mans Cup results ===
(key) (Races in bold indicate pole position) (Races in italics indicate fastest lap)

Year	Entrant	Class	1	2	3	4	5	6	7	Rank	Points
2021	Phoenix Racing	LMP3	BAR; 7	LEC; 4	**MNZ**; Ret	LMS; 12	LMS; 5	**SPA**; 4	POR	9th	37.5

=== Complete European Le Mans Series results ===
(key) (Races in bold indicate pole position; results in italics indicate fastest lap)

Year	Entrant	Class	Chassis	Engine	1	2	3	4	5	6	Rank	Points
2021	Eurointernational	LMP3	Ligier JS P320	Nissan VK56DE 5.6L V8	CAT	RBR	LEC	MNZ	SPA	ALG; 9	16th	4
2022	United Autosports	LMP3	Ligier JS P320	Nissan VK56DE 5.6L V8	LEC; 2	IMO; Ret	MNZ; 5	CAT; 9	SPA; Ret	ALG; 2	8th	48

=== Complete ADAC GT Masters results ===
(key) (Races in bold indicate pole position) (Races in italics indicate fastest lap)

Year	Team	Car	1	2	3	4	5	6	7	8	9	10	11	12	DC	Points
2023	Team Joos by RACEmotion	Porsche 911 GT3 R (992)	HOC1; 1; 5	HOC1; 2; 1^{3}	NOR; 1; 3	NOR; 2; 2^{2}	NÜR; 1; 10	NÜR; 2; 3^{3}	SAC; 1; 5	SAC; 2; 8	RBR; 1 Ret	RBR; 2; 2^{3}	HOC2; 1; 4	HOC2; 2 Ret	5th	151

=== Complete GT World Challenge Asia results ===
(key) (Races in bold indicate pole position) (Races in italics indicate fastest lap)

Year	Team	Car	1	2	3	4	5	6	7	8	9	10	11	12	DC	Points
2024	Absolute Corse	Ferrari 296 GT3	SEP; 1; 19	SEP; 2; 14	BUR; 1; 11	BUR; 2; 8	FUJ; 1; 22	FUJ; 2; 14	SUZ; 1; 4	SUZ; 2; 25	OKA; 1; 12	OKA; 2; 25	SHA; 1 Ret	SHA; 2 Ret	31st	16

=== Complete 24 Hours of Le Mans results ===
Year	Team	Co-Drivers	Car	Class	Laps	Pos.	Class Pos.
2025	(France) Akkodis ASP Team	(United Kingdom) Jack Hawksworth (France) Arnold Robin	Lexus RC F GT3	LMGT3	268	DNF	DNF
2026	(United Kingdom) Garage 59	(Germany) Benjamin Goethe (Sweden) Alexander West	McLaren 720S GT3 Evo	LMGT3	329	47th	15th

=== Complete FIA World Endurance Championship results ===
(key) (Races in bold indicate pole position; races in italics indicate fastest lap)

Year	Entrant	Class	Car	Engine	1	2	3	4	5	6	7	8	Rank	Points
2025	Akkodis ASP Team	LMGT3	Lexus RC F GT3	Lexus 2UR-GSE 5.4 L V8	QAT; 4	IMO; 3	**SPA**; 8	LMS; Ret	SÃO; 5	COA; 14	FUJ; 9	**BHR**; Ret	9th	51
2026	Garage 59	LMGT3	McLaren 720S GT3 Evo	McLaren M840T 4.0 L Turbo V8	IMO; 7	SPA; 5	LMS; 10	SÃO; 11	COA; 8	FUJ; Ret	CAT; 11	MNZ; Ret	19th	22
