= Jusuf Owega =

German racing driver (born 2002)

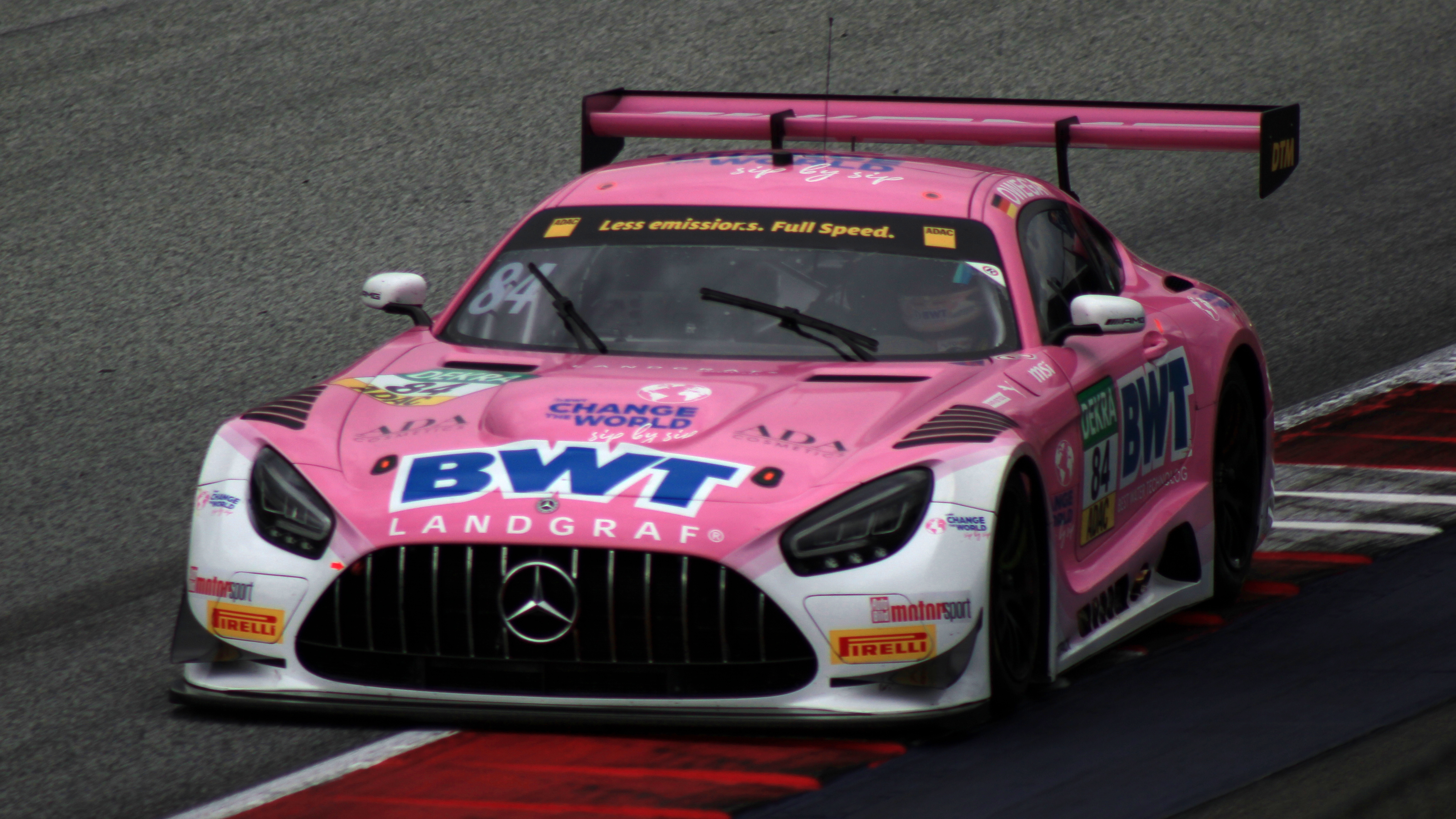
- Owega at the Red Bull Ring in 2023
- Nationality: (Germany) German
- Born: 6 April 2002 (age 24) Cologne, Germany
- Relatives: Salman Owega (brother); Hamza Owega (brother)

Deutsche Tourenwagen Masters career
- Debut season: 2023
- Current team: Mercedes-AMG Team Landgraf
- Categorisation: FIA Silver (until 2023); FIA Gold (2024–)
- Starts: 16 (16 entries)
- Wins: 0
- Podiums: 0
- Poles: 0
- Fastest laps: 0
- Best finish: TBD in 2023

Previous series
- 2021–22 2020–21 2019 2018: ADAC GT Masters; GTWC Europe Sprint Cup; ADAC GT4 Germany; BRDC British F3 Championship

Jusuf Owega (born 6 April 2002) is a German racing driver currently competing in the GT World Challenge Europe Sprint Cup for HRT Ford Performance.

== Racing record ==
=== Racing career summary ===
Season	Series	Team	Races	Wins	Poles	F/Laps	Podiums	Points	Position
2018	BRDC British Formula 3 Championship	Hillspeed	20	0	0	0	0	187	11th
2019	ADAC GT4 Germany	GetSpeed Performance	11	0	1	1	4	116	**3rd**
2020	GT World Challenge Europe Sprint Cup	Belgian Audi Club Team WRT	10	0	0	0	0	2.5	21st
2020	GT World Challenge Europe Sprint Cup - Silver	Belgian Audi Club Team WRT	10	0	0	0	5	70	**3rd**
2021	ADAC GT Masters	Phoenix Racing	14	0	0	0	0	54	18th
2021	GT World Challenge Europe Sprint Cup	Attempto Racing	2	0	0	0	0	0.5	34th
2021	Nürburgring Endurance Series - VT3	Team Mathol Racing	1	1	1	0	1	0	NC†
2021	Nürburgring Endurance Series - V6	Team Mathol Racing	2	1	1	0	2	0	NC†
2022	ADAC GT Masters	Montaplast by Land Motorsport	13	1	0	1	2	117	8th
2022	Nürburgring Endurance Series - SP9	Montaplast by Land Motorsport	1	0	0	0	1	0	NC†
2022	GT World Challenge Europe Endurance Cup	Leipert Motorsport	1	0	0	0	0	0	NC
2022	GT World Challenge Europe Endurance Cup - Silver	Leipert Motorsport	1	0	0	0	0	0	NC
2023	Deutsche Tourenwagen Masters	Mercedes-AMG Team BWT	16	0	0	0	0	28	22nd
2024	GT World Challenge Europe Endurance Cup	Haupt Racing Team	5	0	0	0	0	0	NC
2024	GT World Challenge Europe Endurance Cup - Gold Cup	Haupt Racing Team	5	1	0	0	3	95	**3rd**
2024	Nürburgring Langstrecken-Serie - SP9	Mercedes-AMG Team Bilstein by HRT	2	0	0	0	0	0	NC†
2024	Nürburgring Langstrecken-Serie - SP9	Team ADVAN x HRT	3	0	0	0	2	0	NC†
2024	Intercontinental GT Challenge	Mercedes-AMG Team Bilstein by HRT							
2024	24 Hours of Nürburgring - SP9	Mercedes-AMG Team Bilstein by HRT	1	0	0	0	0	N/A	11th
2025	Nürburgring Langstrecken-Serie - SP9	HRT Ford Performance							
2025	24 Hours of Nürburgring - SP9 Pro-Am	HRT Ford Performance	1	1	0	0	1	N/A	**1st**
2025	GT World Challenge Europe Sprint Cup	HRT Ford Performance	7	0	0	0	0	0	NC

^{†} As Owega was a guest driver, he was ineligible to score points. ^{*} Season still in progress.

=== Complete BRDC British Formula 3 Championship results ===
(key) (Races in bold indicate pole position; races in italics indicate fastest lap)

Year	Team	1	2	3	4	5	6	7	8	9	10	11	12	13	14	15	16	17	18	19	20	21	22	23	24	DC	Points
2018	Hillspeed	OUL; 1	OUL; 2	OUL; 3	ROC; 1; 8	ROC; 2; 16	ROC; 3 Ret	SNE; 1; 12	SNE; 2; 6	SNE; 3; 10	SIL1; 1; 7	SIL1; 2; 15	SIL1; 3; 8	SPA; 1; 8	SPA; 2; 9^{2}	SPA; 3; 5	BHI; 1; 11	BHI; 2; 6	BHI; 3; 9	DON; 1; 9	DON; 2 Ret	DON; 3; 12	SIL2; 1; 7	SIL2; 2; 10	SIL2; 3 C	11th	187

=== Complete ADAC GT4 Germany results ===
(key) (Races in bold indicate pole position) (Races in italics indicate fastest lap)

Year	Team	Car	1	2	3	4	5	6	7	8	9	10	11	12	DC	Points
2019	GetSpeed Performance	Mercedes-AMG GT4	OSC; 1; 2	OSC; 2; 6	RBR; 1; 6	RBR; 2 Ret	ZAN; 1; 5	ZAN; 2; 2	NÜR; 1; 3	NÜR; 2; 3	HOC; 1; 7	HOC; 2 Ret	SAC; 1; 15	SAC; 2 Ret	3rd	116

=== Complete GT World Challenge Europe results ===
==== GT World Challenge Europe Sprint Cup ====
Year	Team	Car	Class	1	2	3	4	5	6	7	8	9	10	Pos.	Points
2020	Belgian Audi Club Team WRT	Audi R8 LMS Evo	Silver	MIS; 1; 18	MIS; 2; 10	MIS; 3; 10	MAG; 1; 10	MAG; 2; 9	ZAN; 1; 15	ZAN; 2 Ret	CAT; 1; 15	CAT; 2; 12	CAT; 3; 11	3rd	70
2021	Attempto Racing	Audi R8 LMS Evo	Pro	MAG; 1	MAG; 2	ZAN; 1; 10	ZAN; 2; 11	MIS; 1	MIS; 2	BRH; 1	BRH; 2	VAL; 1	VAL; 2	34th	0.5
2025	HRT Ford Performance	Ford Mustang GT3	Pro	BRH; 1; 28	BRH; 2; 25	ZAN; 1 Ret	ZAN; 2; 21	MIS; 1; 22	MIS; 2; 22	MAG; 1 Ret	MAG; 2 WD	VAL; 1	VAL; 2	NC	0

==== GT World Challenge Europe Endurance Cup ====
Year	Team	Car	Class	1	2	3	4	5	6	7	Pos.	Points
2022	Leipert Motorsport	Lamborghini Huracán GT3 Evo	Silver	IMO	LEC	SPA; 6H	SPA; 12H	SPA; 24H	HOC; Ret	CAT	NC	0
2024	Haupt Racing Team	Mercedes-AMG GT3 Evo	Gold	LEC; 47	SPA; 6H; 47	SPA; 12H; 40	SPA; 24H; 17	NÜR; 19	MNZ; 22	JED; 34	3rd	95

=== Complete ADAC GT Masters results ===
(key) (Races in bold indicate pole position) (Races in italics indicate fastest lap)

Year	Team	Car	1	2	3	4	5	6	7	8	9	10	11	12	13	14	DC	Points
2021	Phoenix Racing	Audi R8 LMS Evo	OSC; 1; 10	OSC; 2; 18	RBR; 1; 15	RBR; 2; 12	ZAN; 1; 22	ZAN; 2; 9	LAU; 1 Ret	LAU; 2; 16	SAC; 1; 22	SAC; 2; 6	HOC; 1; 5	HOC; 2 Ret	NÜR; 1; 12	NÜR; 2; 5	18th	54
2022	Montaplast by Land Motorsport	Audi R8 LMS Evo II	OSC; 1; 1^{2}	OSC; 2; 6	RBR; 1; 7	RBR; 2; 5	ZAN; 1; 4	ZAN; 2 DNS	NÜR; 1; 12	NÜR; 2; 17	LAU; 1; 7	LAU; 2; 13	SAC; 1; 17	SAC; 2 Ret	HOC; 1; 8	HOC; 2; 2^{2}	8th	117

=== Complete Deutsche Tourenwagen Masters results ===
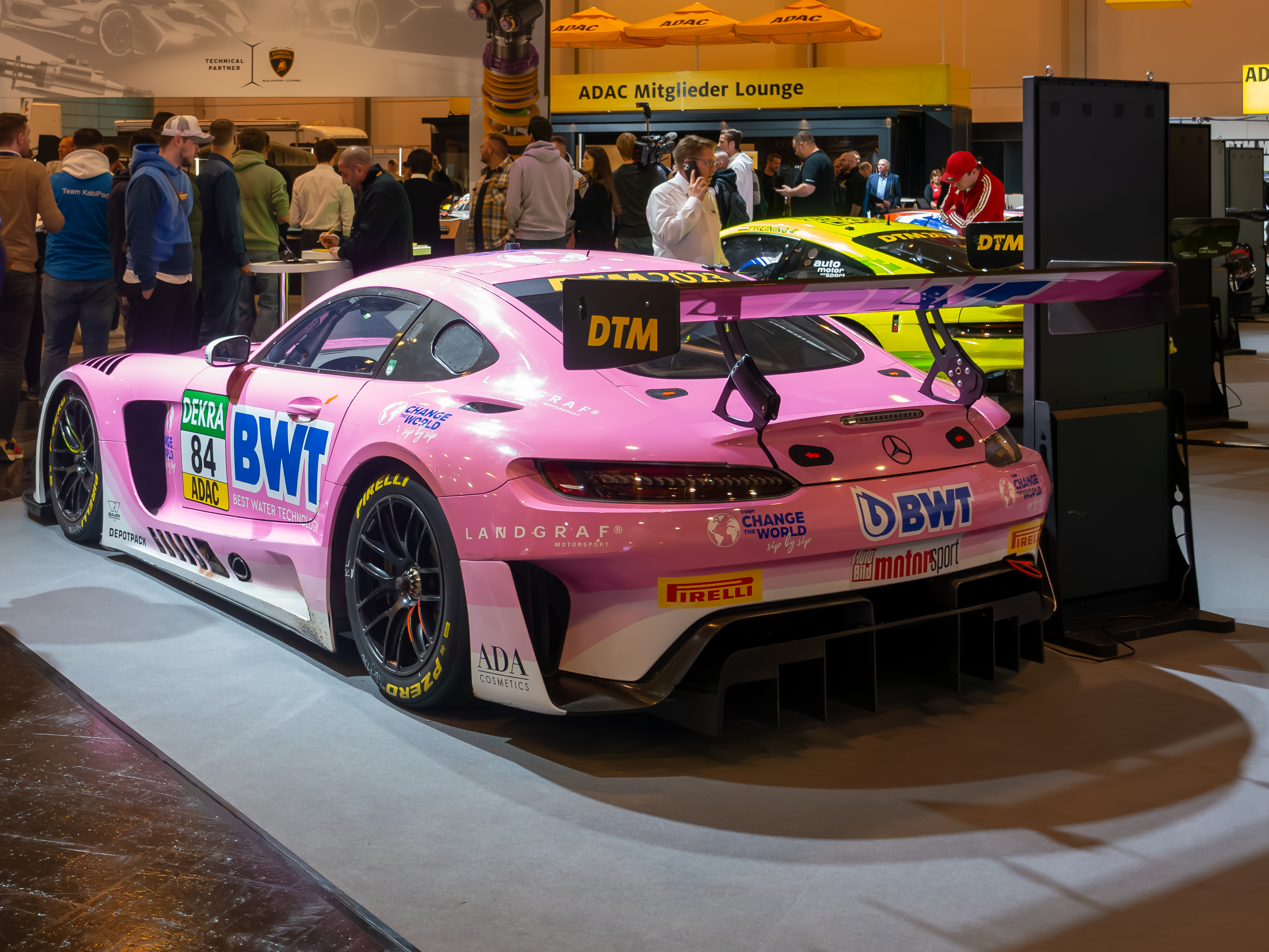
Owega's Mercedes-AMG GT3 Evo

(key) (Races in bold indicate pole position) (Races in italics indicate fastest lap)

Year	Entrant	Chassis	1	2	3	4	5	6	7	8	9	10	11	12	13	14	15	16	Rank	Points
2023	Mercedes-AMG Team Landgraf	Mercedes-AMG GT3 Evo	OSC; 1; 14	OSC; 2; 8	ZAN; 1; 10	ZAN; 2 Ret	NOR; 1 Ret	NOR; 2; 18	NÜR; 1; 17	NÜR; 2; 16	LAU; 1; 14	LAU; 2; 17	SAC; 1; 14	SAC; 2; 10	RBR; 1 Ret	RBR; 2; 19	HOC; 1; 22	HOC; 2; 15	22nd	28
