= Salman Owega =

German racing driver (born 2005)

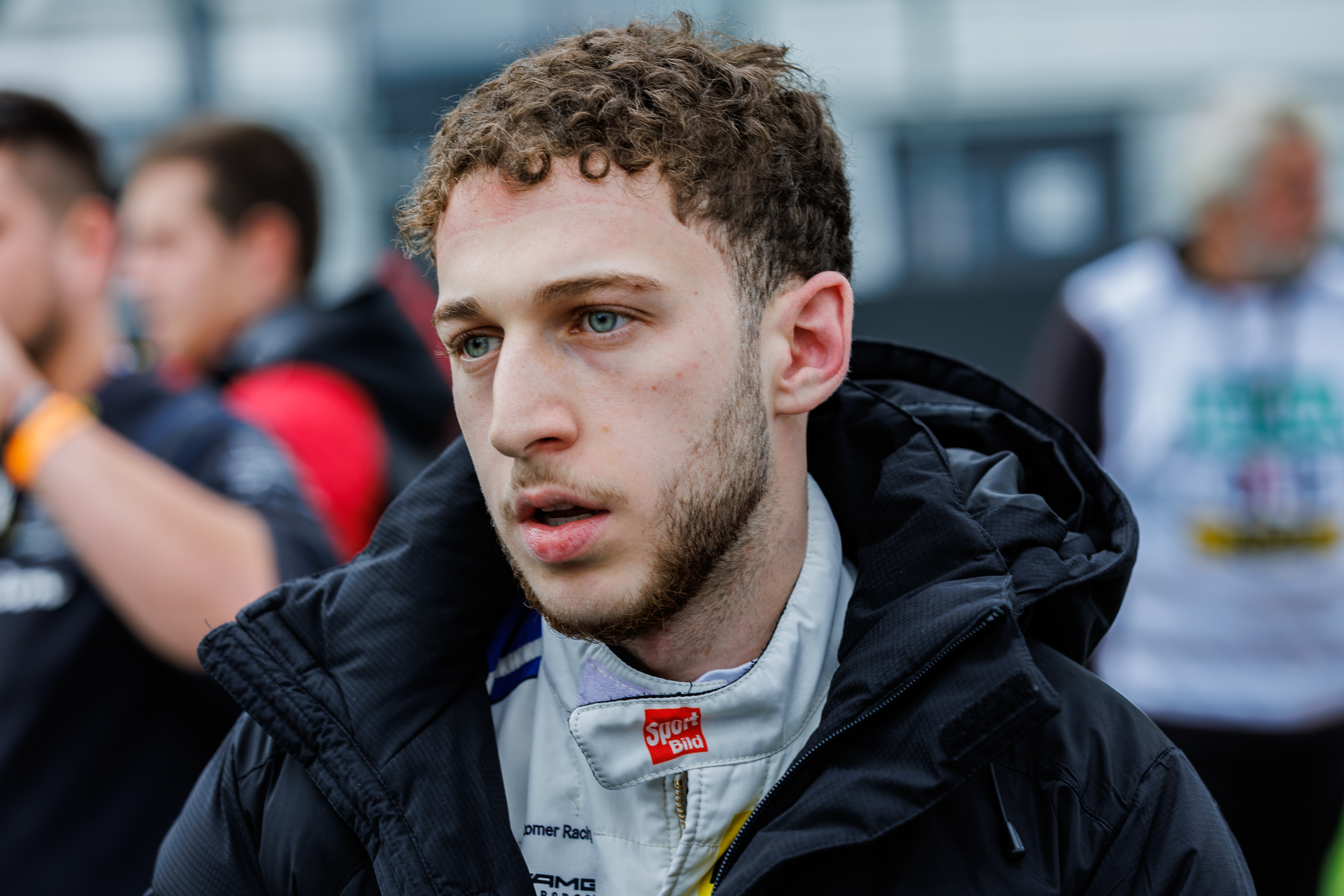
- Owega in 2024
- Nationality: (Germany) German
- Born: 25 May 2005 (age 21) Cologne, Germany
- Relatives: Jusuf Owega (brother); Hamza Owega (brother)
- Categorisation: FIA Bronze (2021); FIA Silver (2022–)

Championship titles
- 2023, 2025 2021 2021: ADAC GT Masters; GTC Race – GT3 Semi-Pro; GT60 Race – GT3 Semi-Pro

Salman Owega (born 25 May 2005) is a German racing driver who last competed for Optimum Motorsport in the GT World Challenge Europe Endurance Cup.

== Personal life ==
Owega is the younger brother of fellow racing drivers Hamza and Jusuf Owega. He is also the son of Dr. Ammar Owega, who founded Owega Racing in 2014.

== Career ==
Owega began karting at the age of six, competing until 2017. During his karting career, Owega most notably won the 2014 ADAC Kart Bundesendlauf in the Bambini light class.

In 2021, Owega stepped up to car racing, joining Phoenix Racing to race in the GTC Race sprint and endurance series in the GT3 Semi-Pro class. In his first season of car racing, Owega won the Semi-Pro title in both GTC sprint and Goodyear 60 championships after scoring all but one class wins. Towards the end of the year, Owega also made his ADAC GT Masters debut for PROsport Racing, and was also set to race for Phoenix Racing in the season finale, but the team withdrew following a crash in practice which left the car with excessive damage.

Remaining in GT3 competition for 2022, Owega joined Audi-affiliated Montaplast by Land Motorsport for his first full season in ADAC GT Masters alongside Christopher Haase. In the seven-round season, Owega scored a best result of fourth at Sachsenring to end the year 28th in points.

Owega stayed in ADAC GT Masters for 2023, joining Elias Seppänen at Mercedes-affiliated Landgraf Motorsport. In his sophomore season in the series, Owega scored his maiden series win at the Norisring, before winning at the Nürburgring and both Sachsenring races, on his way to his first ADAC GT Masters title.

Switching to Mercedes-affiliated Haupt Racing Team for 2024, Owega was joined by David Schumacher for his third full season in ADAC GT Masters. Alongside Schumacher, the pair won both races at the Nürburgring, and scored their third win of the season at Hockenheimring as they concluded the season third in the standings. During 2024, Owega also made his debut in the Nürburgring Langstrecken-Serie for the same team, in which he won the NLS4 alongside Schumacher and Hubert Haupt.

Despite Haupt Racing Team switching to Ford for 2025, Owega remained with the team partnered up with Finn Wiebelhaus as the pair became Ford Performance GT3 Juniors. The pair scored their first win of the season at the Nürburgring, before scoring further wins at the Red Bull Ring and Hockenheimring en route to Owega's second and Wiebelhaus' first ADAC GT Masters title. During 2025, Owega also won the SP9 Pro-Am class of the 24 Hours of Nürburgring, and also made his GT World Challenge Europe Endurance Cup debut with the same team at the 24 Hours of Spa. The following year, Owega became a McLaren junior and joined Optimum Motorsport for one-off appearances in European enduros, most notably winning the 12 Hours of Spa-Francorchamps on his debut with the team.

== Karting record ==
=== Karting career summary ===
Season	Series	Team	Position
2014	Kartclub Kerpen Winterpokal – Bambini Light		2nd
2014	ADAC Kart Bundesendlauf – Bambini Light		1st
2015	ADAC Kart Masters – Bambini		17th
2016	ADAC Kart Masters – Bambini		13th
2017	WSK Champions Cup – OK-J	KSM Schumacher Racing Team	NC
2017	WSK Super Master Series – OK-J	KSM Schumacher Racing Team	61st
2017	South Garda Winter Cup – OK-J	KSM Schumacher Racing Team	NC
2017	Karting European Championship – OK-J	KSM Schumacher Racing Team	51st

== Racing record ==
=== Racing career summary ===
Season	Series	Team	Races	Wins	Poles	F/Laps	Podiums	Points	Position
2021	GTC Race – GT3 Semi-Pro	Phoenix Racing	4	4	0	0	4	34.16	**1st**
2021	GT60 Race – GT3 Semi-Pro	Phoenix Racing	4	3	0	0	4	29.29	**1st**
2021	ADAC GT Masters	Phoenix Racing	0	0	0	0	0	0	NC†
2021	ADAC GT Masters	PROsport Racing	2	0	0	0	0	0	NC†
2021	BMW M2 Cup Germany	Project 1						88	7th
2022	ADAC GT Masters	Montaplast by Land Motorsport	11	0	0	0	0	20	28th
2023	ADAC GT Masters	Landgraf Motorsport	12	4	2	2	6	181	**1st**
2023	Porsche Endurance Trophy Nürburgring Cup – CUP3	Team Mathol Racing e.V.	1	0	0	0	0	0	NC
2024	ADAC GT Masters	Haupt Racing Team	12	3	2	2	5	172	**3rd**
2024	Nürburgring Langstrecken-Serie – SP9 Pro	Team ADVAN x HRT	3	1	0	1	1	0	NC
2024	24 Hours of Nürburgring – SP9 Pro-Am	Team ADVAN x HRT	1	0	0	0	0	—N/a	5th
2024	Intercontinental GT Challenge	Team ADVAN x HRT	1	0	0	0	0	0	NC
2024	Porsche Endurance Trophy Nürburgring Cup – CUP3	Speedworxx Automotive	1	0	0	0	0	0	NC
2025	Middle East Trophy – GT3	Haupt Racing Team	3	0	0	0	0	10	11th
2025	ADAC GT Masters	Haupt Racing Team	12	3	2	2	7	212	**1st**
2025	GT World Challenge Europe Endurance Cup	HRT Ford Performance	1	0	0	0	0	0	NC
2025	GT World Challenge Europe Endurance Cup – Silver	HRT Ford Performance	1	0	0	0	0	14	26th
2025	Nürburgring Langstrecken-Serie – SP9 Pro-Am	HRT Ford Performance	1	0	0	0	1	8	NC
2025	24 Hours of Nürburgring – SP9 Pro-Am	HRT Ford Performance	1	1	0	0	1	—N/a	**1st**
2026	24H Series – GT3	Optimum Motorsport	1	1	1	1	1	40	27th
2026	GT World Challenge Europe Endurance Cup	Optimum Motorsport	1	0	0	0	0	0	NC
2026	GT World Challenge Europe Endurance Cup – Silver	Optimum Motorsport	1	0	0	0	0	29	18th

^{†} As Owega was a guest driver, he was ineligible to score points.

=== Complete ADAC GT Masters results ===
(key) (Races in bold indicate pole position) (Races in italics indicate fastest lap)

Year	Team	Car	1	2	3	4	5	6	7	8	9	10	11	12	13	14	DC	Points
2021	PROsport Racing	Aston Martin Vantage AMR GT3	OSC; 1	OSC; 2	RBR; 1	RBR; 2	ZAN; 1	ZAN; 2	LAU; 1	LAU; 2	SAC; 1	SAC; 2	HOC; 1; 17	HOC; 2; 21			NC†	0†
2021	Phoenix Racing	Audi R8 LMS Evo													NÜR; 1 DNS	NÜR; 2 DNS	NC†	0†
2022	Montaplast by Land Motorsport	Audi R8 LMS Evo II	OSC; 1; 17	OSC; 2; 17	RBR; 1; 17	RBR; 2 DNS	ZAN; 1; 13	ZAN; 2; 15	NÜR; 1 Ret	NÜR; 2; 14	LAU; 1; 18	LAU; 2; 18†	SAC; 1; 15	SAC; 2; 4	HOC; 1 WD	HOC; 2 WD	28th	20
2023	Landgraf Motorsport	Mercedes-AMG GT3 Evo	HOC1; 1 Ret^{3}	HOC1; 2; 3^{2}	NOR; 1; 1^{1}	NOR; 2; 4	NÜR; 1; 1^{2}	NÜR; 2; 8	SAC; 1; 1^{1}	SAC; 2; 1	RBR; 1 DSQ	RBR; 2; 6	HOC2; 1; 9	HOC2; 2; 3			1st	181
2024	Haupt Racing Team	Mercedes-AMG GT3 Evo	OSC; 1; 6	**OSC**; **2** Ret^{1}	ZAN; 1; 6^{2}	ZAN; 2; 3	NÜR; 1; 1	**NÜR**; **2**; 1^{1}	SPA; 1 Ret	SPA; 2; 7	RBR; 1; 2	RBR; 2; 4	HOC; 1; 1	HOC; 2; 7			3rd	174
2025	Haupt Racing Team	Ford Mustang GT3	LAU; 1; 2^{2}	LAU; 2; 4^{2}	ZAN; 1; 5	ZAN; 2 Ret	NÜR; 1; 2^{2}	**NÜR**; **2**; 1^{1}	SAL; 1; 7^{2}	SAL; 2; 3^{2}	RBR; 1; 2	**RBR**; **2**; 1^{1}	HOC; 1; 9	HOC; 2; 1			1st	212

=== Complete GT World Challenge Europe results ===
==== GT World Challenge Europe Endurance Cup ====
(Races in bold indicate pole position) (Races in italics indicate fastest lap)

Year	Team	Car	Class	1	2	3	4	5	6	7	Pos.	Points
2025	HRT Ford Performance	Ford Mustang GT3	Silver	LEC	MNZ	SPA; 6H; 29	SPA; 12H; 30	SPA; 24H; 35†	NÜR	CAT	26th	14
2026	Optimum Motorsport	McLaren 720S GT3 Evo	Silver	LEC	MNZ	SPA; 6H; 30	SPA; 12H; 11	SPA; 24H; 17	NÜR	ALG	18th	29
