= Haupt Racing Team =

German racing team founded by Hubert Haupt

(Germany) Haupt Racing Team
- Founded: 2020
- Base: Meuspath, Rhineland-Palatinate
- Team principal(s): Hubert Haupt; Sean Paul Breslin
- Current series: GT World Challenge Europe; Deutsche Tourenwagen Masters; ADAC GT Masters; Nürburgring Endurance Series
- Drivers' Championships: DTM ( (Germany) Maximilian Götz 2021); GTWCE Sprint Cup Silver Cup ( (Australia) Jordan Love 2023)
- Website: https://www.hauptracingteam.de/

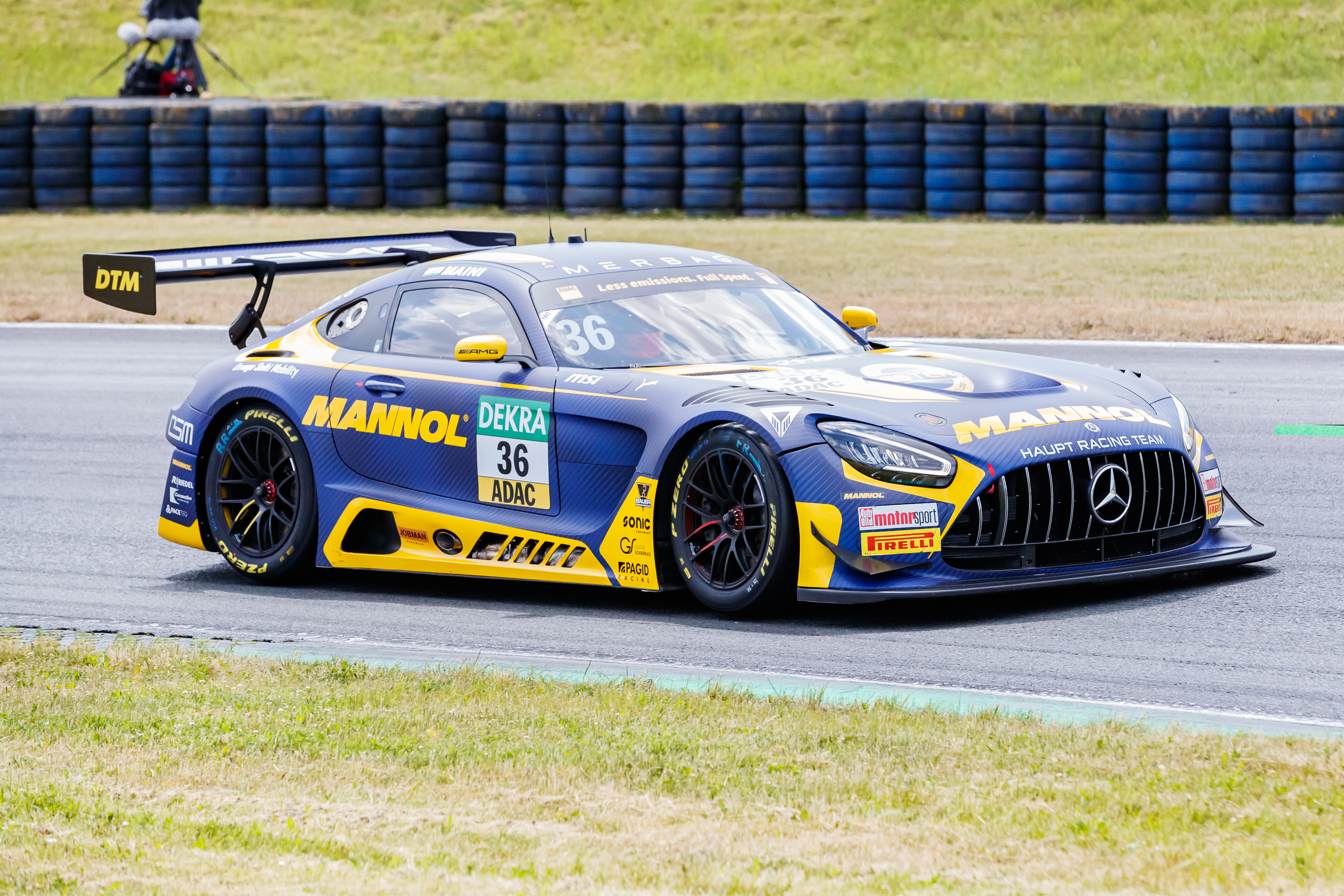
Arjun Maini Mercedes-AMG GT3 Evo for Haupt Racing Team that was in the 2023 DTM series at the Oschersleben.

The Haupt Racing Team (short: HRT) is a German auto racing team founded in 2020 by Hubert Haupt. It currently functions as the official Ford Racing team in Europe. HRT competes in DTM, ADAC GT Masters, GT World Challenge Europe and NLS. Over the last couple of years, HRT has accumulated lots of success including a DTM Driver's Championship, an ADAC GT Masters title and titles in the GTWC Europe.

== History ==
The Haupt Racing Team was founded in 2020 by German racing driver and entrepreneur Hubert Haupt in the wake of Black Falcon's retreat from professional racing. Having its race equipment located in Drees, near the Nürburgring, HRT focused on racing in the Nürburgring Langstrecken-Serie and the Nürburgring 24 Hours. Also, HRT took part in the GT World Challenge Europe. From its foundation, HRT acted as a Mercedes-AMG Performance Team until it switched to Ford in 2025.

HRT made its competitive debut on 27 June 2020, finishing on the podium in P2 having started on pole in the opening round of the NLS. The following round, HRT achieved its maiden victory followed by another on the next day. On 12 September 2020, HRT achieved its first international victory by winning in the first race of GT World Challenge Europe Sprint Cup at Circuit de Nevers Magny-Cours. Since 2021 HRT has competed in the DTM, winning the drivers' title in its first season with Maximilian Götz. In 2023 HRT won the Sprint Cup in the GT World Challenge Europe Silver category—securing both the teams' and drivers' titles.

In 2025 HRT expanded its motorsport portfolio by entering into a partnership with the kart team SIM-ON to help young drivers on their to way into professional motorsport.

== Racing results ==
=== Complete DTM results ===
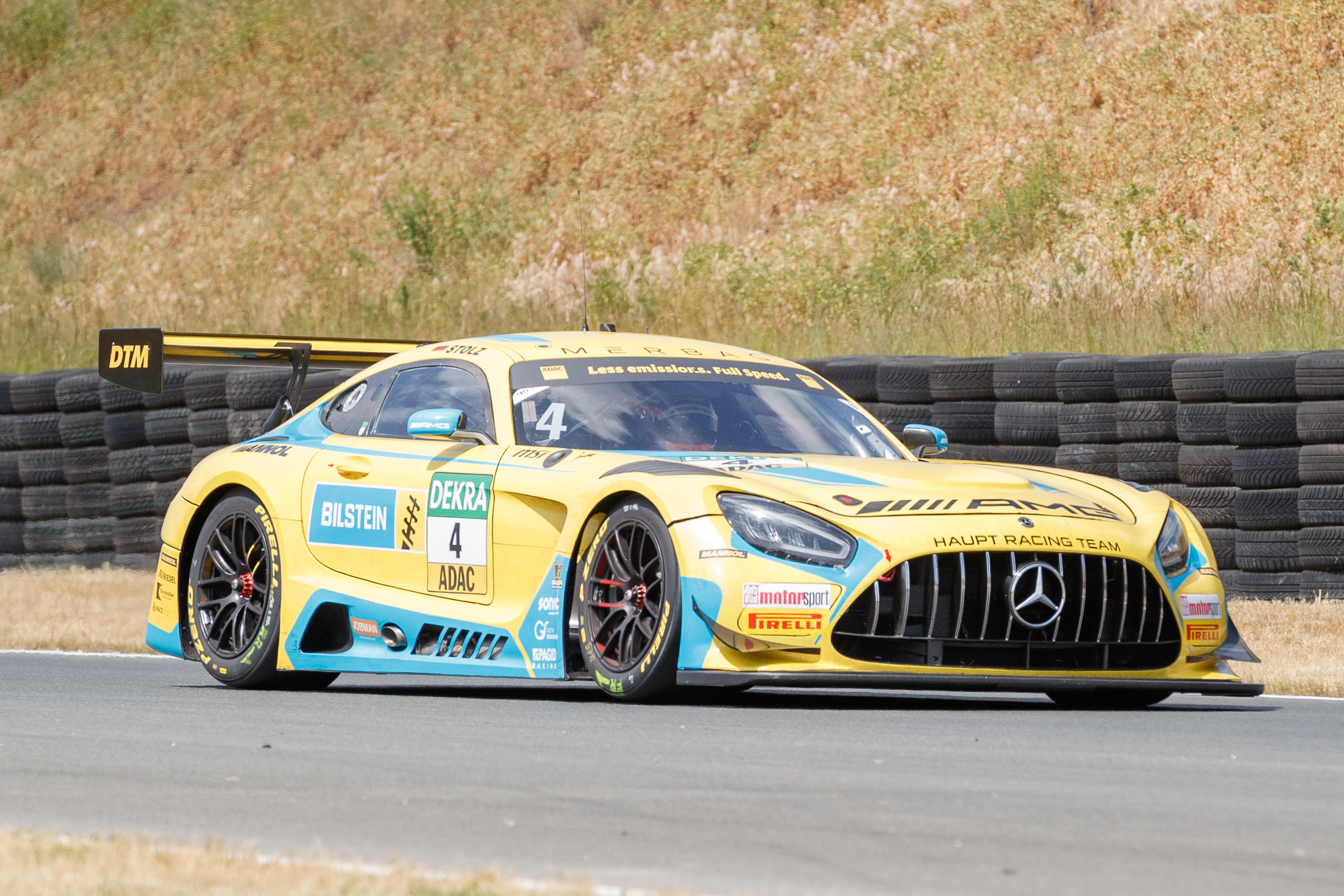
Luca Stolz Mercedes-AMG GT3 Evo for Mercedes-AMG Team Bilstein that was in the 2023 DTM series at the Oschersleben.

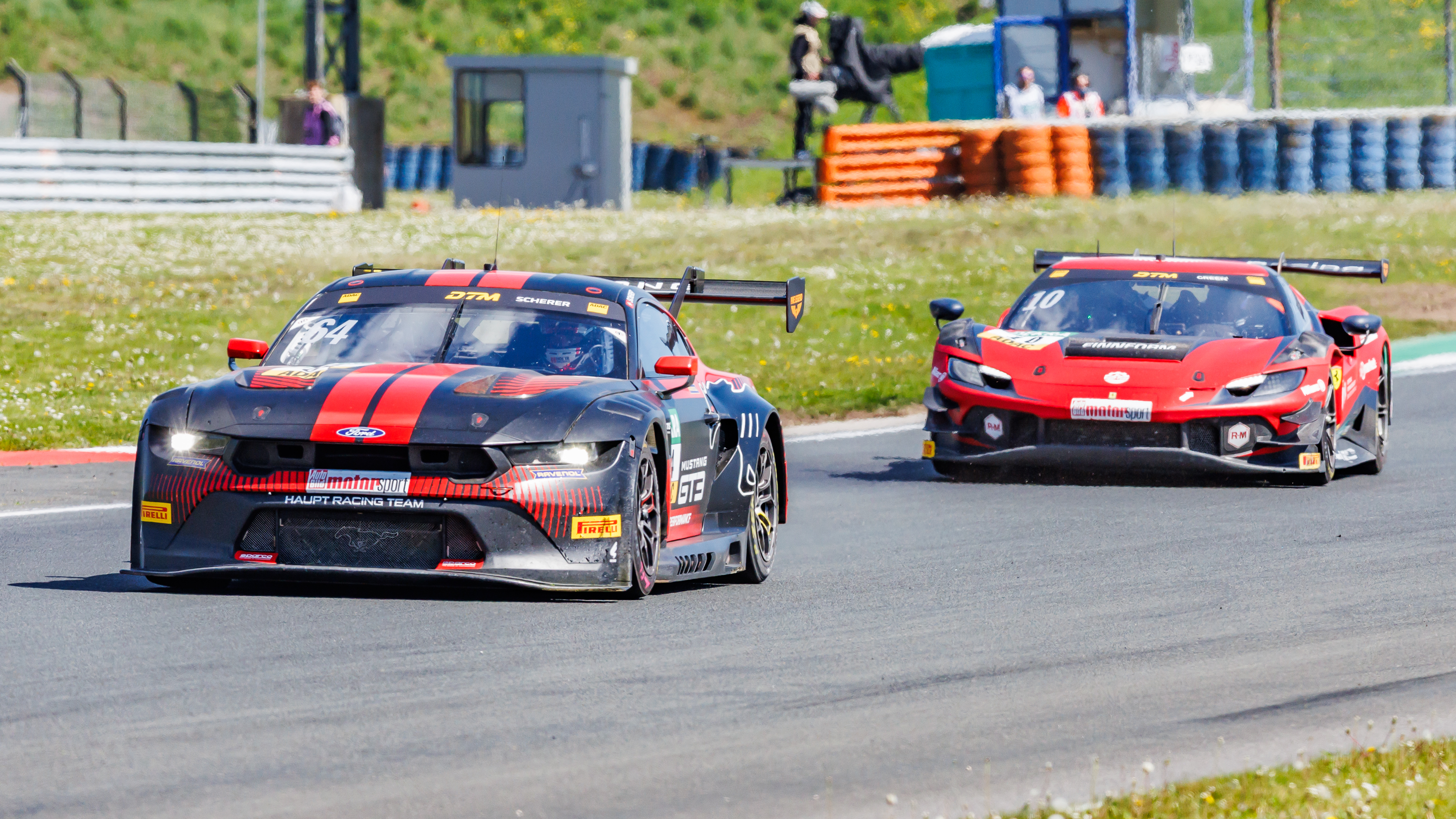
Fabio Scherer Ford Mustang GT3 for HRT Ford Performance in the 2025 DTM series at the Oschersleben.

Year	Drivers	Car	No.	Rds.	Rounds																Pos.	Pts.	Pos.	Pts.
Year	Drivers	Car	No.	Rds.	1	2	3	4	5	6	7	8	9	10	11	12	13	14	15	16	Pos.	Pts.	Pos.	Pts.
2021	(Germany) Maximilian Götz	Mercedes-AMG GT3 Evo	4	All	MNZ; 1; 2^{3}	MNZ; 2; 10	LAU; 1 Ret	LAU; 2; 1^{3}	ZOL; 1; 7^{2}	ZOL; 2; 2	NUR; 1; 4	NUR; 2; 4	RBR; 1; 2^{2}	RBR; 2; 3	ASS; 1; 4^{3}	ASS; 2; 6	HOC; 1; 5	HOC; 2; 3	NOR; 1; 1	NOR; 2; 1	1st	230	4th	262
2021	(Monaco) Vincent Abril	Mercedes-AMG GT3 Evo	5	All	**MNZ**; **1**; **DSQ**	MNZ; 2 DSQ	LAU; 1 Ret	LAU; 2; 14	ZOL; 1; 4	ZOL; 2 Ret	NUR; 1; 12	NUR; 2; 8	RBR; 1; 9	RBR; 2; 8	ASS; 1 Ret	ASS; 2; 9	HOC; 1; 9	HOC; 2; 9	NOR; 1; 14	NOR; 2; 8	14th	34	4th	262
2021	(Germany) Hubert Haupt	Mercedes-AMG GT3 Evo	6	7–8, 13–14	MNZ; 1	MNZ; 2	LAU; 1	LAU; 2	ZOL; 1	ZOL; 2	NUR; 1; 18	NUR; 2 Ret	RBR; 1	RBR; 2	ASS; 1	ASS; 2	HOC; 1; 13	HOC; 2; 13	NOR; 1	NOR; 2	NC	—	4th	262
2022	(Germany) Luca Stolz	Mercedes-AMG GT3 Evo	4	All	POR; 1; 2	POR; 2 Ret	LAU; 1; 2	LAU; 2; 12	IMO; 1; 11	IMO; 2; 12	NOR; 1; 7	NOR; 2; 8	NUR; 1; 17	NUR; 2; 1	SPA; 1; 15	SPA; 2; 5	RBR; 1; 10	RBR; 2; 2	HOC; 1; 9^{2}	HOC; 2; 9	6th	108	6th	130
2022	(India) Arjun Maini	Mercedes-AMG GT3 Evo	36	All	POR; 1; 17	POR; 2; 13	LAU; 1; 4	LAU; 2; 13	IMO; 1; 16	IMO; 2; 18	NOR; 1 Ret	NOR; 2; 14	NUR; 1; 15	NUR; 2; 14	SPA; 1; 14	SPA; 2; 11	RBR; 1; 13	RBR; 2; 4	HOC; 1 Ret	HOC; 2 DNS	19th	24	6th	130
2023	(Germany) Luca Stolz	Mercedes-AMG GT3 Evo	4	All	OSC; 1 Ret	OSC; 2 Ret	ZAN; 1; 11	ZAN; 2; 3	NOR; 1 Ret	NOR; 2; 10	NUR; 1; 15	NUR; 2; 13	LAU; 1; 6	LAU; 2; 3	**SAC**; **1**; **1^{1}**	SAC; 2; 2^{3}	RBR; 1; 7	RBR; 2 Ret	HOC; 1; 8	HOC; 2; 7^{3}	6th	133	5th	158
2023	(India) Arjun Maini	Mercedes-AMG GT3 Evo	36	All	OSC; 1 Ret	OSC; 2; 15	ZAN; 1; 17	ZAN; 2; 17	NOR; 1; 13	NOR; 2; 15	NUR; 1; 16	NUR; 2 DSQ	LAU; 1 Ret	LAU; 2; 14	SAC; 1; 13	SAC; 2; 7	RBR; 1; 14	RBR; 2; 10	HOC; 1 Ret	HOC; 2; 13	20th	30	5th	158
2024	(Germany) Luca Stolz	Mercedes-AMG GT3 Evo	4	1–14	OSC; 1; 5	OSC; 2; 3^{2}	LAU; 1; 10	LAU; 2 DSQ	ZAN; 1; 10	ZAN; 2; 5	NOR; 1; 11	NOR; 2; 7	NUR; 1; 12	NUR; 2; 11	SAC; 1; 4	SAC; 2; 1^{3}	RBR; 1 R	RBR; 2 Ret	HOC; 1	HOC; 2	9th	127	5th	272
2024	(Andorra) Jules Gounon	Mercedes-AMG GT3 Evo	4	15–16	OSC; 1	OSC; 2	LAU; 1	LAU; 2	ZAN; 1	ZAN; 2	NOR; 1	NOR; 2	NUR; 1	NUR; 2	SAC; 1	SAC; 2	RBR; 1	RBR; 2	HOC; 1; 6	HOC; 2 Ret	21st	10	5th	272
2024	(India) Arjun Maini	Mercedes-AMG GT3 Evo	36	All	OSC; 1; 8^{3}	OSC; 2; 4	LAU; 1; 7	LAU; 2; 12	ZAN; 1; 3^{3}	ZAN; 2; 6	NOR; 1; 15	NOR; 2; 4	NUR; 1; 10	NUR; 2 Ret	SAC; 1; 5	SAC; 2 Ret	**RBR**; **1**; **3^{1}**	RBR; 2; 3	HOC; 1; 8	HOC; 2; 13	7th	139	5th	272
2025	(India) Arjun Maini	Ford Mustang GT3	36	1–6	OSC; 1; 15	OSC; 2; 16	LAU; 1; 12	LAU; 2; 18	ZAN; 1 Ret	ZAN; 2; 10	NOR; 1	NOR; 2	NUR; 1	NUR; 2	SAC; 1	SAC; 2	RBR; 1	RBR; 2	HOC; 1	HOC; 2	17th*	11*	10th*	17*
2025	(Switzerland) Fabio Scherer	Ford Mustang GT3	64	1–6	OSC; 1; 19	OSC; 2; 18	LAU; 1 Ret	LAU; 2 Ret	ZAN; 1; 11	ZAN; 2 DNS	NOR; 1	NOR; 2	NUR; 1	NUR; 2	SAC; 1	SAC; 2	RBR; 1	RBR; 2	HOC; 1	HOC; 2	21st*	5*	10th*	17*

=== Complete ADAC GT Masters results ===
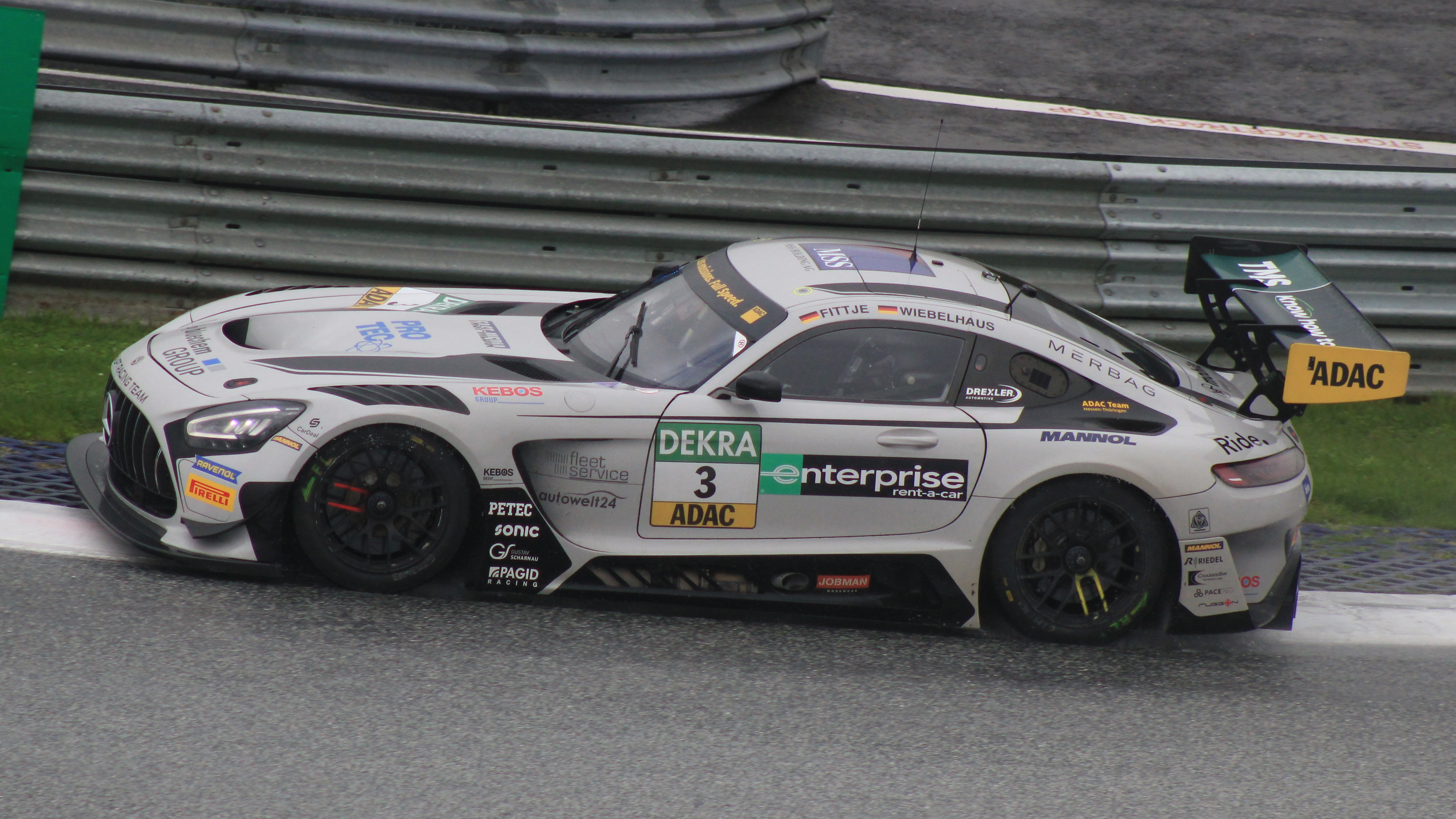
Jannes Fittje and Finn Wiebelhaus for Haupt Racing Team in the 2024 ADAC GT Masters series at the Red Bull Ring.

Year	Drivers	Car	No.	Rds.	Rounds												Pos.	Pts.
Year	Drivers	Car	No.	Rds.	1	2	3	4	5	6	7	8	9	10	11	12	Pos.	Pts.
2023	(Estonia) Ralf Aron	Mercedes-AMG GT3 Evo	2	All	HOC; 1; 7	HOC; 2; 9	NOR; 1; 4	NOR; 2; 5	NUR; 1; 2	NUR; 2; 10	SAC; 1; 4	SAC; 2; 3^{3}	RBR; 1; 4^{2}	RBR; 2; 7	HOC; 1; 2^{2}	**HOC**; **2**; **1^{1}**	2nd	170
2023	(Switzerland) Alain Valente	Mercedes-AMG GT3 Evo	2	All	HOC; 1; 7	HOC; 2; 9	NOR; 1; 4	NOR; 2; 5	NUR; 1; 2	NUR; 2; 10	SAC; 1; 4	SAC; 2; 3^{3}	RBR; 1; 4^{2}	RBR; 2; 7	HOC; 1; 2^{2}	**HOC**; **2**; **1^{1}**	2nd	170
2023	(Romania) Petru Umbrărescu	Mercedes-AMG GT3 Evo	3	All	HOC; 1; 6	**HOC**; **2**; **2^{1}**	NOR; 1; 6	NOR; 2; 7	NUR; 1; 12	NUR; 2; 12	SAC; 1; 3	SAC; 2; 6^{2}	RBR; 1; 6	RBR; 2; 3	HOC; 1; 8	HOC; 2; 2	6th	142
2023	(India) Arjun Maini	Mercedes-AMG GT3 Evo	3	1, 3	HOC; 1; 6	**HOC**; **2**; **2^{1}**	NOR; 1	NOR; 2	NUR; 1; 12	NUR; 2; 12	SAC; 1	SAC; 2	RBR; 1	RBR; 2	HOC; 1	HOC; 2	13th	41
2023	(Germany) Maximilian Götz	Mercedes-AMG GT3 Evo	3	2, 4, 6	HOC; 1	HOC; 2	NOR; 1; 6	NOR; 2; 7	NUR; 1	NUR; 2	SAC; 1; 3	SAC; 2; 6^{2}	RBR; 1	RBR; 2	HOC; 1	HOC; 2	9th	75
2023	(Switzerland) Philip Ellis	Mercedes-AMG GT3 Evo	3	5	HOC; 1	HOC; 2	NOR; 1	NOR; 2	NUR; 1	NUR; 2	SAC; 1	SAC; 2	RBR; 1; 6	RBR; 2; 3	HOC; 1	HOC; 2	22nd	26
2024	(Germany) Salman Owega	Mercedes-AMG GT3 Evo	2	All	OSC; 1; 6	**OSC**; **2**; **Ret^{1}**	ZAN; 1; 6^{2}	ZAN; 2; 3^{2}	NUR; 1; 1	**NUR**; **2**; **1^{1}**	SPA; 1 Ret	SPA; 2; 7	RBR; 1; 2	RBR; 2; 4	HOC; 1; 1^{2}	HOC; 2; 7	3rd	172
2024	(Germany) David Schumacher	Mercedes-AMG GT3 Evo	2	All	OSC; 1; 6	**OSC**; **2**; **Ret^{1}**	ZAN; 1; 6^{2}	ZAN; 2; 3^{2}	NUR; 1; 1	**NUR**; **2**; **1^{1}**	SPA; 1 Ret	SPA; 2; 7	RBR; 1; 2	RBR; 2; 4	HOC; 1; 1^{2}	HOC; 2; 7	3rd	172
2024	(Germany) Jannes Fittje	Mercedes-AMG GT3 Evo	3	All	OSC; 1; 4	OSC; 2; 2^{3}	ZAN; 1; 4	ZAN; 2; 6	NUR; 1 Ret^{3}	NUR; 2; 2^{2}	SPA; 1; 10	SPA; 2; 8	RBR; 1; 1^{2}	RBR; 2; 10	HOC; 1; 7	HOC; 2; 6	4th	151
2024	(Germany) Finn Wiebelhaus	Mercedes-AMG GT3 Evo	3	All	OSC; 1; 4	OSC; 2; 2^{3}	ZAN; 1; 4	ZAN; 2; 6	NUR; 1 Ret^{3}	NUR; 2; 2^{2}	SPA; 1; 10	SPA; 2; 8	RBR; 1; 1^{2}	RBR; 2; 10	HOC; 1; 7	HOC; 2; 6	4th	151
2024	(South Africa) Kwanda Mokena	Mercedes-AMG GT3 Evo	5	All	OSC; 1; 3	OSC; 2; 9	ZAN; 1; 8	ZAN; 2 Ret	NUR; 1; 17	NUR; 2; 15	SPA; 1; 14	SPA; 2; 9	**RBR**; **1**; **4^{1}**	RBR; 2 Ret	HOC; 1 Ret	HOC; 2; 10	13th	73
2024	(Germany) Max Reis	Mercedes-AMG GT3 Evo	5	All	OSC; 1; 3	OSC; 2; 9	ZAN; 1; 8	ZAN; 2 Ret	NUR; 1; 17	NUR; 2; 15	SPA; 1; 14	SPA; 2; 9	**RBR**; **1**; **4^{1}**	RBR; 2 Ret	HOC; 1 Ret	HOC; 2; 10	13th	73
2024	(Germany) Dennis Fetzer	Mercedes-AMG GT3 Evo	79	9–10	OSC; 1	OSC; 2	ZAN; 1	ZAN; 2	NUR; 1	NUR; 2	SPA; 1	SPA; 2	RBR; 1; 5	RBR; 2; 5	HOC; 1	HOC; 2	NC	–
2024	(Germany) Hubert Haupt	Mercedes-AMG GT3 Evo	79	9–10	OSC; 1	OSC; 2	ZAN; 1	ZAN; 2	NUR; 1	NUR; 2	SPA; 1	SPA; 2	RBR; 1; 5	RBR; 2; 5	HOC; 1	HOC; 2	NC	–
2025	(Germany) Salman Owega	Ford Mustang GT3	1	1–4	LAU; 1; 2^{2}	LAU; 2; 4^{2}	ZAN; 1; 5	ZAN; 2 Ret	NUR; 1	NUR; 2	SAL; 1	SAL; 2	RBR; 1	RBR; 2	HOC; 1	HOC; 2	5th*	48*
2025	(Germany) Finn Wiebelhaus	Ford Mustang GT3	1	1–4	LAU; 1; 2^{2}	LAU; 2; 4^{2}	ZAN; 1; 5	ZAN; 2 Ret	NUR; 1	NUR; 2	SAL; 1	SAL; 2	RBR; 1	RBR; 2	HOC; 1	HOC; 2	5th*	48*
2025	(Venezuela) Jonathan Cecotto	Ford Mustang GT3	2	1–4	LAU; 1 Ret	LAU; 2; 5	ZAN; 1; 7	ZAN; 2; 9	NUR; 1	NUR; 2	SAL; 1	SAL; 2	RBR; 1	RBR; 2	HOC; 1	HOC; 2	12th*	27*
2025	(Germany) Dennis Fetzer	Ford Mustang GT3	2	1–4	LAU; 1 Ret	LAU; 2; 5	ZAN; 1; 7	ZAN; 2; 9	NUR; 1	NUR; 2	SAL; 1	SAL; 2	RBR; 1	RBR; 2	HOC; 1	HOC; 2	12th*	27*
2025	(Germany) Niklas Kalus	Ford Mustang GT3	3	1–4	LAU; 1; 3	**LAU**; **2**; **Ret^{1}**	ZAN; 1; 6	ZAN; 2; 5	NUR; 1	NUR; 2	SAL; 1	SAL; 2	RBR; 1	RBR; 2	HOC; 1	HOC; 2	7th*	40*
2025	(Germany) Max Reis	Ford Mustang GT3	3	1–4	LAU; 1; 3	**LAU**; **2**; **Ret^{1}**	ZAN; 1; 6	ZAN; 2; 5	NUR; 1	NUR; 2	SAL; 1	SAL; 2	RBR; 1	RBR; 2	HOC; 1	HOC; 2	7th*	40*

=== Complete Nürburgring Langstrecken-Serie results ===
Year	Drivers	Car	Class		No.	Rds.	Rounds										Pos.	Pts.	Pos.	Pts.
Year	Drivers	Car	Class		No.	Rds.	1	2	3	4	5	6	7	8	9	10	Pos.	Pts.	Pos.	Pts.
2020	(Germany) Patrick Assenheimer	Mercedes-AMG GT3 Evo	SP9	P	6	All	**NLS1**; **2**	NLS2; 16	NLS3; 10	NLS4; 3	NLS5; Ret						13th	23.11		
2020	(Austria) Dominik Baumann	Mercedes-AMG GT3 Evo	SP9	P	6	2–5	NLS1	NLS2; 16	NLS3; 10	NLS4; 3	NLS5; Ret						36th	14.47		
2020	(Germany) Dirk Müller	Mercedes-AMG GT3 Evo	SP9	P	6	2–5	NLS1	NLS2; 16	NLS3; 10	NLS4; 3	NLS5; Ret						36th	14.47		
2020	(Germany) Maro Engel	Mercedes-AMG GT3 Evo	SP9	P	6	1, 5	**NLS1**; **2**	NLS2	NLS3	NLS4	NLS5; Ret						3rd	28.13		
2020	(Germany) Maro Engel	Mercedes-AMG GT3 Evo	SP9	P	16	2–3, 5	NLS1	**NLS2**; **1**	**NLS3**; **1**	NLS4	NLS5; Ret						3rd	28.13		
2020	(United Kingdom) Adam Christodoulou	Mercedes-AMG GT3 Evo	SP9	P	16	2–3, 5	NLS1	**NLS2**; **1**	**NLS3**; **1**	NLS4	NLS5; Ret						19th	19.49		
2020	(Austria) Manuel Metzger	Mercedes-AMG GT3 Evo	SP9	P	16	2–3, 5	NLS1	**NLS2**; **1**	**NLS3**; **1**	NLS4	NLS5; Ret						19th	19.49		
2020	(Germany) Luca Stolz	Mercedes-AMG GT3 Evo	SP9	P	16	2–3, 5	NLS1	**NLS2**; **1**	**NLS3**; **1**	NLS4	NLS5; Ret						19th	19.49		
2020	(Germany) Hubert Haupt	Mercedes-AMG GT3 Evo	SP9	P	17	2–3, 5	NLS1	NLS2; 11	NLS3; 7	NLS4	NLS5; 6						22nd	19.04		
2020	(Netherlands) Yelmer Buurman	Mercedes-AMG GT3 Evo	SP9	P	17	2–3	NLS1	NLS2; 11	NLS3; 7	NLS4	NLS5						45th	11.33		
2020	(Italy) Gabriele Piana	Mercedes-AMG GT3 Evo	SP9	P	17	2, 5	NLS1	NLS2; 11	NLS3	NLS4	NLS5; 6						44th	12.46		
2020	(Germany) Nico Bastian	Mercedes-AMG GT3 Evo	SP9	P	17	3, 5	NLS1	NLS2	NLS3; 7	NLS4	NLS5; 6						38th	14.29		
2020	(United Kingdom) Philip Ellis	Mercedes-AMG GT3 Evo	SP9	P	17	5	NLS1	NLS2	NLS3	NLS4	NLS5; 6						59th	7.71		
2021	(Germany) Hubert Haupt	Mercedes-AMG GT3 Evo	SP9	P	6	1, 5–8	NLS1; C	NLS2	NLS3	NLS4	NLS5; 2	NLS6; 9	NLS7; 8	NLS8; 6	NLS9					
2021	(Germany) Patrick Assenheimer	Mercedes-AMG GT3 Evo	SP9	P	6	1, 5–8	NLS1; C	NLS2	NLS3	NLS4	NLS5; 2	NLS6; 9	NLS7; 8	NLS8; 6	NLS9					
2021	(Germany) Nico Bastian	Mercedes-AMG GT3 Evo	SP9	P	6	1	NLS1; C	NLS2	NLS3	NLS4	NLS5	NLS6	NLS7	NLS8	NLS9					
2021	(Germany) Maro Engel	Mercedes-AMG GT3 Evo	SP9	P	6	1	NLS1; C	NLS2	NLS3	NLS4	NLS5	NLS6	NLS7	NLS8	NLS9					
2021	(United Kingdom) Adam Christodoulou	Mercedes-AMG GT3 Evo	SP9	P	6	5	NLS1	NLS2	NLS3	NLS4	NLS5; 2	NLS6	NLS7	NLS8	NLS9					
2021	(Switzerland) Manuel Metzger	Mercedes-AMG GT3 Evo	SP9	P	6	6–8	NLS1	NLS2	NLS3	NLS4	NLS5	NLS6; 9	NLS7; 8	NLS8; 6	NLS9					
2021	(United Kingdom) Adam Christodoulou	Mercedes-AMG GT3 Evo	SP9	P	16	1, 3	NLS1; C	NLS2	NLS3; 10	NLS4	NLS5	NLS6	NLS7	NLS8	NLS9					
2021	(Germany) Luca Stolz	Mercedes-AMG GT3 Evo	SP9	P	16	1, 3	NLS1; C	NLS2	NLS3; 10	NLS4	NLS5	NLS6	NLS7	NLS8	NLS9					
2021	(Switzerland) Manuel Metzger	Mercedes-AMG GT3 Evo	SP9	P	16	1	NLS1; C	NLS2	NLS3	NLS4	NLS5	NLS6	NLS7	NLS8	NLS9					
2021	(Germany) Maro Engel	Mercedes-AMG GT3 Evo	SP9	P	16	3	NLS1	NLS2	NLS3; 10	NLS4	NLS5	NLS6	NLS7	NLS8	NLS9					
2021	(Germany) Hubert Haupt	Mercedes-AMG GT3 Evo	SP9	P	16	3	NLS1	NLS2	NLS3; 10	NLS4	NLS5	NLS6	NLS7	NLS8	NLS9					
2022	(Germany) Hubert Haupt	Mercedes-AMG GT3 Evo	SP9	P	6	1–3, 6	NLS1; 49	NLS2; Ret	NLS3; Ret	NLS4	NLS5	NLS6; Ret	NLS7	NLS8					26th	19
2022	(Switzerland) Philip Ellis	Mercedes-AMG GT3 Evo	SP9	P	6	1–2	NLS1; 49	NLS2; Ret	NLS3	NLS4	NLS5	NLS6	NLS7	NLS8					26th	19
2022	(Germany) Nico Bastian	Mercedes-AMG GT3 Evo	SP9	P	6	1–2	NLS1; 49	NLS2; Ret	NLS3	NLS4	NLS5	NLS6	NLS7	NLS8					26th	19
2022	(Germany) Luca Stolz	Mercedes-AMG GT3 Evo	SP9	P	6	3	NLS1	NLS2	NLS3; Ret	NLS4	NLS5	NLS6	NLS7	NLS8					26th	19
2022	(Australia) Jordan Love	Mercedes-AMG GT3 Evo	SP9	P	6	4, 6–7	NLS1	NLS2	NLS3	NLS4; 6	NLS5	NLS6; Ret	NLS7; DNS	NLS8					26th	19
2022	(Austria) Lucas Auer	Mercedes-AMG GT3 Evo	SP9	P	6	4, 7	NLS1	NLS2	NLS3	NLS4; 6	NLS5	NLS6	NLS7; DNS	NLS8					26th	19
2022	(India) Arjun Maini	Mercedes-AMG GT3 Evo	SP9	P	6	4, 7	NLS1	NLS2	NLS3	NLS4; 6	NLS5	NLS6	NLS7; DNS	NLS8					26th	19
2022	(Germany) Luca Stolz	Mercedes-AMG GT3 Evo	SP9	P	12	1–2	NLS1; 4	NLS2; 10	NLS3	NLS4	NLS5	NLS6	NLS7	NLS8					NC (Note: Driver listed as ineligible for points)	—
2022	(Germany) Manuel Metzger	Mercedes-AMG GT3 Evo	SP9	P	12	1–2	NLS1; 4	NLS2; 10	NLS3	NLS4	NLS5	NLS6	NLS7	NLS8					NC	—
2022	(Switzerland) Raffaele Marciello	Mercedes-AMG GT3 Evo	SP9	P	12	1	NLS1; 4	NLS2	NLS3	NLS4	NLS5	NLS6	NLS7	NLS8					NC	—
2023	(India) Arjun Maini	Mercedes-AMG GT3 Evo	SP9	P	6	1–2, 9	NLS1; 11	NLS2; 16	NLS3	NLS4	NLS5	NLS6	NLS7	NLS8	NLS9; 85		NC	—	32nd	15
2023	(Germany) Hubert Haupt	Mercedes-AMG GT3 Evo	SP9	P	6	1–2	NLS1; 11	NLS2; 16	NLS3	NLS4	NLS5	NLS6	NLS7	NLS8	NLS9		NC	—	32nd	15
2023	(Australia) Jordan Love	Mercedes-AMG GT3 Evo	SP9	P	6	1–2	NLS1; 11	NLS2; 16	NLS3	NLS4	NLS5	NLS6	NLS7	NLS8	NLS9		NC	—	32nd	15
2023	(United Kingdom) Frank Bird	Mercedes-AMG GT3 Evo	SP9	P	6	9	NLS1	NLS2	NLS3	NLS4	NLS5	NLS6	NLS7	NLS8	NLS9; 85		NC	—	32nd	15
2023	(Estonia) Ralf Aron	Mercedes-AMG GT3 Evo	SP9	P	6	9	NLS1	NLS2	NLS3	NLS4	NLS5	NLS6	NLS7	NLS8	NLS9; 85		NC	—	32nd	15
2023	(Germany) Thomas Jäger	Mercedes-AMG GT2	SP-X		52	4	NLS1	NLS2	NLS3	NLS4; 11	NLS5	NLS6	NLS7	NLS8	NLS9		NC	—	NC	—
2023	(Estonia) Ralf Aron	Mercedes-AMG GT2	SP-X		52	4	NLS1	NLS2	NLS3	NLS4; 11	NLS5	NLS6	NLS7	NLS8	NLS9		NC	—	NC	—
2023	(Germany) Tobias Wahl	Mercedes-AMG GT4	SP10		189	1–4	NLS1; 36	NLS2; DSQ	NLS3; 35	NLS4; Ret	NLS5	NLS6	NLS7	NLS8	NLS9		16th	10	NC	0
2023	(Germany) Reinhold Renger	Mercedes-AMG GT4	SP10		189	1–4	NLS1; 36	NLS2; DSQ	NLS3; 35	NLS4; Ret	NLS5	NLS6	NLS7	NLS8	NLS9		16th	10	NC	0
2023	(Germany) Tim-Florian Wahl	Mercedes-AMG GT4	SP10		189	4	NLS1	NLS2	NLS3	NLS4; Ret	NLS5	NLS6	NLS7	NLS8	NLS9		NC	—	NC	0
2024	(Italy) Michele Beretta	Mercedes-AMG GT3 Evo	SP9	P	3	3–4	NLS1	NLS2	24H-Q1; Ret	24H-Q2; 14	NLS3	NLS4	NLS5	NLS6					NC	—
2024	(United Kingdom) Frank Bird	Mercedes-AMG GT3 Evo	SP9	P	3	3–4	NLS1	NLS2	24H-Q1; Ret	24H-Q2; 14	NLS3	NLS4	NLS5	NLS6					NC	—
2024	(Germany) Jusuf Owega	Mercedes-AMG GT3 Evo	SP9	P	3	3–4	NLS1	NLS2	24H-Q1; Ret	24H-Q2; 14	NLS3	NLS4	NLS5	NLS6					NC	—
2024	(India) Arjun Maini	Mercedes-AMG GT3 Evo	SP9	P	3	4	NLS1	NLS2	24H-Q1	24H-Q2; 14	NLS3	NLS4	NLS5	NLS6					NC	—
2024	(Germany) Maximilian Götz	Mercedes-AMG GT3 Evo	SP9	P	4	3–4	NLS1	NLS2	24H-Q1; 13	24H-Q2; 7	NLS3	NLS4	NLS5	NLS6					NC	—
2024	(Germany) Luca Stolz	Mercedes-AMG GT3 Evo	SP9	P	4	3–4	NLS1	NLS2	24H-Q1; 13	24H-Q2; 7	NLS3	NLS4	NLS5	NLS6					NC	—
2024	(India) Arjun Maini	Mercedes-AMG GT3 Evo	SP9	P	4	3	NLS1	NLS2	24H-Q1; 13	24H-Q2	NLS3	NLS4	NLS5	NLS6					NC	—
2024	(Spain) Daniel Juncadella	Mercedes-AMG GT3 Evo	SP9	P	4	4	NLS1	NLS2	24H-Q1	24H-Q2; 7	NLS3	NLS4	NLS5	NLS6					NC	—
2024	(Estonia) Ralf Aron	Mercedes-AMG GT3 Evo	SP9	PA	6	1–4	NLS1; 6	NLS2; 13	24H-Q1	24H-Q1; 16	NLS3	NLS4	NLS5	NLS6			NC	—	3rd	113
2024	(Germany) Dennis Fetzer	Mercedes-AMG GT3 Evo	SP9	PA	6	1–4	NLS1; 6	NLS2; 13	24H-Q1; 15	24H-Q2; 16	NLS3	NLS4	NLS5	NLS6			NC	—	3rd	113
2024	(Germany) Hubert Haupt	Mercedes-AMG GT3 Evo	SP9	PA	6	1–4	NLS1; 6	NLS2; 13	24H-Q1; 15	24H-Q2; 16	NLS3	NLS4	NLS5	NLS6			NC	—	3rd	113
2024	(Germany) Jusuf Owega	Mercedes-AMG GT3 Evo	SP9	PA	6	3–4	NLS1	NLS2	24H-Q1; 15	24H-Q2; 16	NLS3	NLS4	NLS5	NLS6			NC	—	3rd	113
2024	(Germany) Jusuf Owega	Mercedes-AMG GT3 Evo	SP9	P	6	5–7	NLS1	NLS2	24H-Q1	24H-Q2	NLS3; 3	NLS4; DNS	NLS5; 3	NLS6					3rd	113
2024	(Germany) Dennis Fetzer	Mercedes-AMG GT3 Evo	SP9	P	6	6–8	NLS1	NLS2	24H-Q1	24H-Q2	NLS3	NLS4; DNS	NLS5; 3	NLS6; 4					3rd	113
2024	(India) Arjun Maini	Mercedes-AMG GT3 Evo	SP9	P	6	5–6	NLS1	NLS2	24H-Q1	24H-Q2	NLS3; 3	NLS4; DNS	NLS5	NLS6					3rd	113
2024	(Germany) Hubert Haupt	Mercedes-AMG GT3 Evo	SP9	P	6	5	NLS1	NLS2	24H-Q1	24H-Q2	NLS3; 3	NLS4	NLS5	NLS6					3rd	113
2024	(Italy) Michele Beretta	Mercedes-AMG GT3 Evo	SP9	P	6	7	NLS1	NLS2	24H-Q1	24H-Q2	NLS3	NLS4	NLS5; 3	NLS6					3rd	113
2024	(Germany) Finn Wiebelhaus	Mercedes-AMG GT3 Evo	SP9	P	6	8	NLS1	NLS2	24H-Q1	24H-Q2	NLS3	NLS4	NLS5	NLS6; 4					3rd	113
2024	(Germany) Salman Owega	Mercedes-AMG GT3 Evo	SP9	P	6	8	NLS1	NLS2	24H-Q1	24H-Q2	NLS3	NLS4	NLS5	NLS6; 4					3rd	113
2024	(Germany) Salman Owega	Mercedes-AMG GT3 Evo	SP9	P	9	5–6	NLS1	NLS2	24H-Q1	24H-Q2	NLS3; 5	NLS4; 1	NLS5	NLS6					NC	—
2024	(Germany) David Schumacher	Mercedes-AMG GT3 Evo	SP9	P	9	5–6	NLS1	NLS2	24H-Q1	24H-Q2	NLS3; 5	NLS4; 1	NLS5	NLS6					NC	—
2024	(Germany) Dennis Fetzer	Mercedes-AMG GT3 Evo	SP9	P	9	5	NLS1	NLS2	24H-Q1	24H-Q2	NLS3; 5	NLS4	NLS5	NLS6					NC	—
2024	(Germany) Hubert Haupt	Mercedes-AMG GT3 Evo	SP9	P	9	6	NLS1	NLS2	24H-Q1	24H-Q2	NLS3	NLS4; 1	NLS5	NLS6					NC	—
2024	(United Kingdom) Frank Bird	Mercedes-AMG GT3 Evo	SP9	P	14	1–2	**NLS1**; **5**	**NLS2**; **4**	24H-Q1	24H-Q2	NLS3	NLS4	NLS5	NLS6					NC	—
2024	(Spain) Daniel Juncadella	Mercedes-AMG GT3 Evo	SP9	P	14	1–2	**NLS1**; **5**	**NLS2**; **4**	24H-Q1	24H-Q2	NLS3	NLS4	NLS5	NLS6					NC	—
2025	(Norway) Dennis Olsen	Ford Mustang GT3	SP9	P	2	1–2	NLS1; DNS	NLS2; 7	NLS3	24H-Q1	24H-Q2	NLS6	NLS7	NLS8	NLS9	NLS10	NC	—	NC	—
2025	(India) Arjun Maini	Ford Mustang GT3	SP9	P	2	1, 3	NLS1; DNS	NLS2	NLS3; WD	24H-Q1	24H-Q2	NLS6	NLS7	NLS8	NLS9	NLS10	NC	—	NC	—
2025	(Germany) Hubert Haupt	Ford Mustang GT3	SP9	P	2	2–3	NLS1	NLS2; 7	NLS3; WD	24H-Q1	24H-Q2	NLS6	NLS7	NLS8	NLS9	NLS10	NC	—	NC	—
2025	(Germany) Jusuf Owega	Ford Mustang GT3	SP9	P	2	2–3	NLS1	NLS2; 7	NLS3; WD	24H-Q1	24H-Q2	NLS6	NLS7	NLS8	NLS9	NLS10	NC	—	NC	—
2025	(Germany) Nico Bastian	Ford Mustang GT3	SP9	P	2	1	NLS1; DNS	NLS2	NLS3	24H-Q1	24H-Q2	NLS6	NLS7	NLS8	NLS9	NLS10	NC	—	NC	—
2025	(Germany) Frank Stippler	Ford Mustang GT3	SP9	P	2	1–3	NLS1; DNS	NLS2; 7	NLS3; WD	24H-Q1	24H-Q2	NLS6	NLS7	NLS8	NLS9	NLS10	1st*	12*	NC	—
2025	(Germany) Frank Stippler	Ford Mustang GT3	SP9	P	6	6–10	NLS1	NLS2	NLS3	24H-Q1	24H-Q2	NLS6; 3	NLS7; Ret	NLS8; 1	NLS9; 3	NLS10	1st*	12*	4th*	118*
2025	(Germany) Dennis Fetzer	Ford Mustang GT3	SP9	P	6	1, 3	NLS1; 10	NLS2	NLS3; 9	24H-Q1	24H-Q2	NLS6	NLS7	NLS8	NLS9	NLS10	NC	—	4th*	118*
2025	(Germany) Dirk Müller	Ford Mustang GT3	SP9	P	6	1, 3	NLS1; 10	NLS2	NLS3; 9	24H-Q1	24H-Q2	NLS6	NLS7	NLS8	NLS9	NLS10	NC	—	4th*	118*
2025	(Germany) Jusuf Owega	Ford Mustang GT3	SP9	P	6	1	NLS1; 10	NLS2	NLS3	24H-Q1	24H-Q2	NLS6	NLS7	NLS8	NLS9	NLS10	NC	—	4th*	118*
2025	(Germany) David Schumacher	Ford Mustang GT3	SP9	P	6	1	NLS1; 10	NLS2	NLS3	24H-Q1	24H-Q2	NLS6	NLS7	NLS8	NLS9	NLS10	NC	—	4th*	118*
2025	(Germany) Vincent Kolb	Ford Mustang GT3	SP9	P	6	3, 6–10	NLS1	NLS2	NLS3; 9	24H-Q1	24H-Q2	NLS6; 3	NLS7; Ret	NLS8; 1	NLS9; 3	NLS10	NC	—	4th*	118*
2025	(Germany) Patrick Assenheimer	Ford Mustang GT3	SP9	P	6	3, 6	NLS1	NLS2	NLS3; 9	24H-Q1	24H-Q2	NLS6; 3	NLS7	NLS8	NLS9	NLS10	NC	—	4th*	118*
2025	(Germany) Patrick Assenheimer	Ford Mustang GT3	SP9	PA	6	2	NLS1	NLS2; 2	NLS3	24H-Q1	24H-Q2	NLS6	NLS7	NLS8	NLS9	NLS10	NC	—	4th*	118*
2025	(Germany) Dennis Fetzer	Ford Mustang GT3	SP9	PA	6	2	NLS1	NLS2; 2	NLS3	24H-Q1	24H-Q2	NLS6	NLS7	NLS8	NLS9	NLS10	NC	—	4th*	118*
2025	(Germany) Salman Owega	Ford Mustang GT3	SP9	PA	6	2	NLS1	NLS2; 2	NLS3	24H-Q1	24H-Q2	NLS6	NLS7	NLS8	NLS9	NLS10	NC	—	4th*	118*
2025	(Germany) David Schumacher	Ford Mustang GT3	SP9	PA	6	2	NLS1	NLS2; 2	NLS3	24H-Q1	24H-Q2	NLS6	NLS7	NLS8	NLS9	NLS10	NC	—	4th*	118*
2025	(United Kingdom) Jann Mardenborough	Ford Mustang GT3	SP9	P	9	9	NLS1	NLS2	NLS3	24H-Q1	24H-Q2	NLS6	NLS7	NLS8	NLS9; 2	NLS10	NC	—	NC	—
2025	(Germany) Dennis Fetzer	Ford Mustang GT3	SP9	P	9	9	NLS1	NLS2	NLS3	24H-Q1	24H-Q2	NLS6	NLS7	NLS8	NLS9; 2	NLS10	NC	—	NC	—
2025	(Switzerland) Fabio Scherer	Ford Mustang GT3	SP9	P	9	9	NLS1	NLS2	NLS3	24H-Q1	24H-Q2	NLS6	NLS7	NLS8	NLS9; 2	NLS10	NC	—	NC	—
2025	(Switzerland) Fabio Scherer	Ford Mustang GT3	SP9	PA	9	10	NLS1	NLS2	NLS3	24H-Q1	24H-Q2	NLS6	NLS7	NLS8	NLS9	NLS10	NC	—	NC	—
2025	(Germany) Dennis Fetzer	Ford Mustang GT3	SP9	PA	9	10	NLS1	NLS2	NLS3	24H-Q1	24H-Q2	NLS6	NLS7	NLS8	NLS9	NLS10	NC	—	NC	—
2025	(Germany) Patrick Assenheimer	Ford Mustang GT3	SP9	PA	9	10	NLS1	NLS2	NLS3	24H-Q1	24H-Q2	NLS6	NLS7	NLS8	NLS9	NLS10	NC	—	NC	—

=== Complete GT World Challenge Europe results ===
==== Sprint Cup ====
Year	Drivers	Car	Class	No.	Rds.	Rounds										Pos.	Pts.	Pos.	Pts.
Year	Drivers	Car	Class	No.	Rds.	1	2	3	4	5	6	7	8	9	10	Pos.	Pts.	Pos.	Pts.
2020	(Germany) Maro Engel	Mercedes-AMG GT3 Evo	P	4	1–2, 4	MIS; 1; 4	MIS; 2; 2	MIS; 3; 4	MAG; 1; 1^{PF}	MAG; 2; 3	ZAN; 1	ZAN; 2	BAR; 1; 5	BAR; 2; 17	BAR; 3 Ret	6th	60	5th	65.5
2020	(Germany) Luca Stolz	Mercedes-AMG GT3 Evo	P	4	1–2, 4	MIS; 1; 4	MIS; 2; 2	MIS; 3; 4	MAG; 1; 1^{PF}	MAG; 2; 3	ZAN; 1	ZAN; 2	BAR; 1; 5	BAR; 2; 17	BAR; 3 Ret	6th	60	5th	65.5
2022	(Italy) Eddie Cheever III	Mercedes-AMG GT3 Evo	S	93 (Note: Entered as Sky – Tempesta Racing)	5	BRH; 1	BRH; 2	MAG; 1	MAG; 2	ZAN; 1	ZAN; 2	MIS; 1	MIS; 2	VAL; 1; 4	VAL; 2; 5	8th (Note: Not all points scored with HRT as service provider)	38.5	7th	44
2022	(United Kingdom) Chris Froggatt	Mercedes-AMG GT3 Evo	S	93	5	BRH; 1	BRH; 2	MAG; 1	MAG; 2	ZAN; 1	ZAN; 2	MIS; 1	MIS; 2	VAL; 1; 4	VAL; 2; 5	8th	38.5	7th	44
2023	(Australia) Jordan Love	Mercedes-AMG GT3 Evo	S	77	All	BRH; 1; 3^{F}	BRH; 2; 2	MIS; 1; 1^{P}	MIS; 2; 3	HOC; 1; 1^{P}	HOC; 2; 2	VAL; 1; 2^{P}	VAL; 2; 2	ZAN; 1; 1^{F}	ZAN; 2; 1^{P}	1st	135	1st	136
2023	(United Kingdom) Frank Bird	Mercedes-AMG GT3 Evo	S	77	1–2, 5	BRH; 1; 3^{F}	BRH; 2; 2	MIS; 1; 1^{P}	MIS; 2; 3	HOC; 1	HOC; 2	VAL; 1	VAL; 2	ZAN; 1; 1^{F}	ZAN; 2; 1^{P}	4th	80.5	1st	136
2023	(Switzerland) Alain Valente	Mercedes-AMG GT3 Evo	S	77	3–4	BRH; 1	BRH; 2	MIS; 1	MIS; 2	HOC; 1; 1^{P}	HOC; 2; 2	VAL; 1; 2^{P}	VAL; 2; 2	ZAN; 1	ZAN; 2	7th	54.5	1st	136
2023	(France) Sébastien Baud	Mercedes-AMG GT3 Evo	B	79	2–4			MIS; 1; 5	MIS; 2; 5	HOC; 1 Ret	HOC; 2; 1	VAL; 1; 5	VAL; 2; 7^{P}			6th	38.5	5th	38.5
2023	(Germany) Hubert Haupt	Mercedes-AMG GT3 Evo	B	79	2–4			MIS; 1; 5	MIS; 2; 5	HOC; 1 Ret	HOC; 2; 1	VAL; 1; 5	VAL; 2; 7^{P}			6th	38.5	5th	38.5
2025	(France) Romain Andriolo	Ford Mustang GT3	P	64	1–2	BRH; 1; 28	BRH; 2; 25	ZAN; 1 Ret	ZAN; 2; 21	MIS; 1	MIS; 2	MAG; 1	MAG; 2	VAL; 1	VAL; 2	NC*	0*	NC*	0*
2025	(Germany) Jusuf Owega	Ford Mustang GT3	P	64	1–2	BRH; 1; 28	BRH; 2; 25	ZAN; 1 Ret	ZAN; 2; 21	MIS; 1	MIS; 2	MAG; 1	MAG; 2	VAL; 1	VAL; 2	NC*	0*	NC*	0*

==== Endurance Cup ====
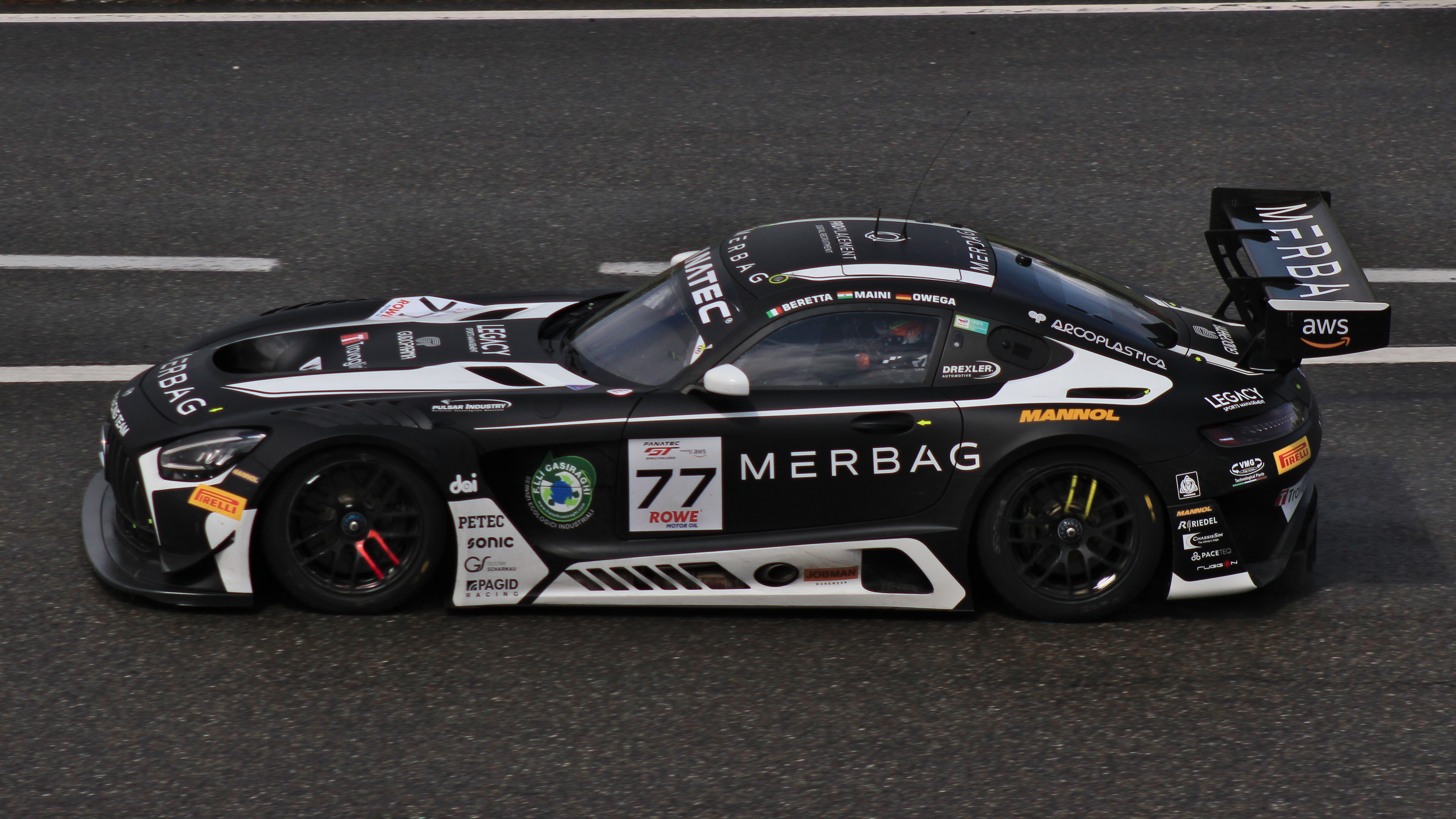
Michele Beretta, Arjun Maini & Jusuf Owega Mercedes-AMG GT3 Evo for Haupt Racing Team in the 2024 GT World Challenge Europe Endurance Cup.

Year	Drivers	Car	Class	No.	Rds.	Events							Pos.	Pts.	Pos.	Pts.
Year	Drivers	Car	Class	No.	Rds.	1	2	3	4	5	6	7	Pos.	Pts.	Pos.	Pts.
2020	(France) Vincent Abril	Mercedes-AMG GT3 Evo	P	4 (Note: Entered as Mercedes-AMG Team HRT in Round 3 (Spa))	All	IMO; 15	NUR; 3	SPA; 6H; 12	SPA; 12H; 4	SPA; 24H; 7	LEC; 6		7th	40	7th	43
2020	(Germany) Maro Engel	Mercedes-AMG GT3 Evo	P	4	All	IMO; 15	NUR; 3	SPA; 6H; 12	SPA; 12H; 4	SPA; 24H; 7	LEC; 6		7th	40	7th	43
2020	(Germany) Luca Stolz	Mercedes-AMG GT3 Evo	P	4	All	IMO; 15	NUR; 3	SPA; 6H; 12	SPA; 12H; 4	SPA; 24H; 7	LEC; 6		7th	40	7th	43
2020	(Russia) Sergey Afanasyev	Mercedes-AMG GT3 Evo	S	5	All	IMO; Ret	NUR; 5	SPA; 6H; 2	SPA; 12H; 1	SPA; 24H; 1	LEC; 3		2nd	77	2nd	77
2020	(Germany) Hubert Haupt	Mercedes-AMG GT3 Evo	S	5	All	IMO; Ret	NUR; 5	SPA; 6H; 2	SPA; 12H; 1	SPA; 24H; 1	LEC; 3		2nd	77	2nd	77
2020	(United Kingdom) Finlay Hutchison	Mercedes-AMG GT3 Evo	S	5	1	IMO; Ret	NUR	SPA; 6H	SPA; 12H	SPA; 24H	LEC		21st (Note: Not all points scored with HRT)	15	2nd	77
2020	(Switzerland) Joël Camathias	Mercedes-AMG GT3 Evo	S	5	2	IMO	NUR; 5	SPA; 6H	SPA; 12H	SPA; 24H	LEC		22nd	12	2nd	77
2020	(Italy) Michele Beretta	Mercedes-AMG GT3 Evo	S	5	3–4	IMO	NUR	SPA; 6H; 2	SPA; 12H; 1	SPA; 24H; 1	LEC; 3		3rd	65	2nd	77
2020	(Italy) Gabriele Piana	Mercedes-AMG GT3 Evo	S	5	3	IMO	NUR	SPA; 6H; 2	SPA; 12H; 1	SPA; 24H; 1	LEC		7th	46	2nd	77
2021	(Germany) Maro Engel	Mercedes-AMG GT3 Evo	P	4 (Note: Entered as Mercedes-AMG Team HRT in Round 3 (Spa))	All	MNZ; 13	LEC; 38	SPA; 6H; 16	SPA; 12H; 15	SPA; 24H; 36	NUR; 3	BAR; 5	12th	25	8th	27
2021	(Germany) Luca Stolz	Mercedes-AMG GT3 Evo	P	4	All	MNZ; 13	LEC; 38	SPA; 6H; 16	SPA; 12H; 15	SPA; 24H; 36	NUR; 3	BAR; 5	12th	25	8th	27
2021	(France) Vincent Abril	Mercedes-AMG GT3 Evo	P	4	1–3	MNZ; 13	LEC; 38	SPA; 6H; 16	SPA; 12H; 15	SPA; 24H; 36	NUR	BAR	NC	0	8th	27
2021	(Germany) Nico Bastian	Mercedes-AMG GT3 Evo	P	4	4–5	MNZ	LEC	SPA; 6H	SPA; 12H	SPA; 24H	NUR; 3	BAR; 5	12th	25	8th	27
2021	(Germany) Patrick Assenheimer	Mercedes-AMG GT3 Evo	S	5	All	MNZ; 11	LEC; 7	SPA; 6H; 17	SPA; 12H; 17	SPA; 24H; Ret	NUR; 5	BAR; 14	25th	16	12th	17
2021	(Germany) Hubert Haupt	Mercedes-AMG GT3 Evo	S	5	All	MNZ; 11	LEC; 7	SPA; 6H; 17	SPA; 12H; 17	SPA; 24H; Ret	NUR; 5	BAR; 14	25th	16	12th	17
2021	(Mexico) Ricardo Sanchez	Mercedes-AMG GT3 Evo	S	5	1	MNZ; 11	LEC	SPA; 6H	SPA; 12H	SPA; 24H	NUR	BAR	9th	55	12th	17
2021	(Italy) Gabriele Piana	Mercedes-AMG GT3 Evo	S	5	2	MNZ	LEC; 7	SPA; 6H	SPA; 12H	SPA; 24H	NUR	BAR	31st	6	12th	17
2021	(Italy) Michele Beretta	Mercedes-AMG GT3 Evo	S	5	3–4	MNZ	LEC	SPA; 6H; 17	SPA; 12H; 17	SPA; 24H; Ret	NUR; 5	BAR	28th	10	12th	17
2021	(Netherlands) Indy Dontje	Mercedes-AMG GT3 Evo	S	5	3, 5	MNZ	LEC	SPA; 6H; 17	SPA; 12H; 17	SPA; 24H; Ret	NUR	BAR; 14	NC	0	12th	17
2022	(Germany) Jannes Fittje	Mercedes-AMG GT3 Evo	S	4	All	IMO; 13	LEC; 5	SPA; 6H; 3	SPA; 12H; 1	SPA; 24H; Ret	HOC; Ret	BAR; 13	10th	31	8th	34
2022	(Australia) Jordan Love	Mercedes-AMG GT3 Evo	S	4	All	IMO; 13	LEC; 5	SPA; 6H; 3	SPA; 12H; 1	SPA; 24H; Ret	HOC; Ret	BAR; 13	10th	31	8th	34
2022	(Switzerland) Alain Valente	Mercedes-AMG GT3 Evo	S	4	All	IMO; 13	LEC; 5	SPA; 6H; 3	SPA; 12H; 1	SPA; 24H; Ret	HOC; Ret	BAR; 13	10th	31	8th	34
2022	(United Kingdom) Frank Bird	Mercedes-AMG GT3 Evo	S	4	3	IMO	LEC	SPA; 6H; 3	SPA; 12H; 1	SPA; 24H; Ret	HOC	BAR	18th	19	8th	34
2022	(Germany) Hubert Haupt	Mercedes-AMG GT3 Evo	G	5	All	IMO; 3	LEC; Ret	SPA; 6H; 1	SPA; 12H; 3	SPA; 24H; Ret	HOC; 2	BAR; 8	5th	56	5th	56
2022	(India) Arjun Maini	Mercedes-AMG GT3 Evo	G	5	All	IMO; 3	LEC; Ret	SPA; 6H; 1	SPA; 12H; 3	SPA; 24H; Ret	HOC; 2	BAR; 8	5th	56	5th	56
2022	(Germany) Florian Scholze	Mercedes-AMG GT3 Evo	G	5	All	IMO; 3	LEC; Ret	SPA; 6H; 1	SPA; 12H; 3	SPA; 24H; Ret	HOC; 2	BAR; 8	5th	56	5th	56
2022	(Italy) Gabriele Piana	Mercedes-AMG GT3 Evo	G	5	3	IMO	LEC	SPA; 6H; 1	SPA; 12H; 3	SPA; 24H; Ret	HOC	BAR	17th	19	5th	56
2022	(Italy) Eddie Cheever III	Mercedes-AMG GT3 Evo	G	93	3–5	IMO	LEC	SPA; 6H; 5	SPA; 12H; 6	SPA; 24H; 3	HOC; 10	BAR; 9	8th	35	7th	35
2022	(United Kingdom) Chris Froggatt	Mercedes-AMG GT3 Evo	G	93	3–5	IMO	LEC	SPA; 6H; 5	SPA; 12H; 6	SPA; 24H; 3	HOC; 10	BAR; 9	8th	35	7th	35
2022	(Hong Kong) Jonathan Hui	Mercedes-AMG GT3 Evo	G	93	3, 5	IMO	LEC	SPA; 6H; 5	SPA; 12H; 6	SPA; 24H; 3	HOC	BAR; 9	9th	34	7th	35
2022	(Italy) Loris Spinelli	Mercedes-AMG GT3 Evo	G	93	3	IMO	LEC	SPA; 6H; 5	SPA; 12H; 6	SPA; 24H; 3	HOC	BAR	14th	24	7th	35
2022	(Austria) Martin Konrad	Mercedes-AMG GT3 Evo	G	93	4	IMO	LEC	SPA; 6H	SPA; 12H	SPA; 24H	HOC; 10	BAR	29th	1	7th	35
2022	(Oman) Al Faisal Al Zubair	Mercedes-AMG GT3 Evo	S	777 (Note: Entered as AlManar Racing by HRT)	All	IMO; 5	LEC; 1	SPA; 6H; 17	SPA; 12H; 17	SPA; 24H; Ret^{P}	HOC; 5	BAR; 4	4th	66	4th	66
2022	(Zimbabwe) Axcil Jefferies	Mercedes-AMG GT3 Evo	S	777	All	IMO; 5	LEC; 1	SPA; 6H; 17	SPA; 12H; 17	SPA; 24H; Ret^{P}	HOC; 5	BAR; 4	4th	66	4th	66
2022	(Germany) Fabian Schiller	Mercedes-AMG GT3 Evo	S	777	All	IMO; 5	LEC; 1	SPA; 6H; 17	SPA; 12H; 17	SPA; 24H; Ret^{P}	HOC; 5	BAR; 4	4th	66	4th	66
2022	(Canada) Daniel Morad	Mercedes-AMG GT3 Evo	S	777	3	IMO	LEC	SPA; 6H; 17	SPA; 12H; 17	SPA; 24H; Ret^{P}	HOC	BAR	30th	1	4th	66
2023	(United Kingdom) Matt Bell	Mercedes-AMG GT3 Evo	PA	64	3	MNZ	LEC	SPA; 6H; 4	SPA; 12H; 5	SPA; 24H; Ret	NUR	BAR	18	11	NC (Note: Team listed as being ineligible for points)	—
2023	(United Kingdom) Frank Bird	Mercedes-AMG GT3 Evo	PA	64	3	MNZ	LEC	SPA; 6H; 4	SPA; 12H; 5	SPA; 24H; Ret	NUR	BAR	18	11	NC	—
2023	(United Kingdom) James Cottingham	Mercedes-AMG GT3 Evo	PA	64	3	MNZ	LEC	SPA; 6H; 4	SPA; 12H; 5	SPA; 24H; Ret	NUR	BAR	18	11	NC	—
2023	(United States) Naveen Rao	Mercedes-AMG GT3 Evo	PA	64	3	MNZ	LEC	SPA; 6H; 4	SPA; 12H; 5	SPA; 24H; Ret	NUR	BAR	18	11	NC	—
2023	(France) Sébastien Baud	Mercedes-AMG GT3 Evo	B	79	All	MNZ; 3	LEC; 1	SPA; 6H; 6	SPA; 12H; 12	SPA; 24H; 5	NUR; 3	BAR; 4	2nd	89	2nd	92
2023	(Germany) Hubert Haupt	Mercedes-AMG GT3 Evo	B	79	All	MNZ; 3	LEC; 1	SPA; 6H; 6	SPA; 12H; 12	SPA; 24H; 5	NUR; 3	BAR; 4	2nd	89	2nd	92
2023	(India) Arjun Maini	Mercedes-AMG GT3 Evo	B	79	All	MNZ; 3	LEC; 1	SPA; 6H; 6	SPA; 12H; 12	SPA; 24H; 5	NUR; 3	BAR; 4	2nd	89	2nd	92
2023	(Australia) Jordan Love	Mercedes-AMG GT3 Evo	B	79	3	MNZ	LEC	SPA; 6H; 6	SPA; 12H; 12	SPA; 24H; 5	NUR	BAR	21st	14	2nd	92
2023	(Netherlands) Nicky Catsburg	Mercedes-AMG GT3 Evo	PA	75 (Note: Entered as SunEnergy1 Racing)	3	MNZ	LEC	SPA; 6H; 5	SPA; 6H; 3	SPA; 24H; 1^{F}	NUR	BAR	10th	37	NC	—
2023	(Austria) Martin Konrad	Mercedes-AMG GT3 Evo	PA	75	3	MNZ	LEC	SPA; 6H; 5	SPA; 6H; 3	SPA; 24H; 1^{F}	NUR	BAR	10th	37	NC	—
2023	(Australia) Chaz Mostert	Mercedes-AMG GT3 Evo	PA	75	3	MNZ	LEC	SPA; 6H; 5	SPA; 6H; 3	SPA; 24H; 1^{F}	NUR	BAR	10th	37	NC	—
2023	(Germany) Adam Osieka	Mercedes-AMG GT3 Evo	PA	75	3	MNZ	LEC	SPA; 6H; 5	SPA; 6H; 3	SPA; 24H; 1^{F}	NUR	BAR	5th	52	NC	—
2024	(Italy) Michele Beretta	Mercedes-AMG GT3 Evo	G	77	All	LEC; 6	SPA; 6H; 4	SPA; 12H; 3	SPA; 24H; 3	NUR; 3	MNZ; 1	JED; 4	3rd	95	3rd	95
2024	(India) Arjun Maini	Mercedes-AMG GT3 Evo	G	77	All	LEC; 6	SPA; 6H; 4	SPA; 12H; 3	SPA; 24H; 3	NUR; 3	MNZ; 1	JED; 4	3rd	95	3rd	95
2024	(Germany) Jusuf Owega	Mercedes-AMG GT3 Evo	G	77	All	LEC; 6	SPA; 6H; 4	SPA; 12H; 3	SPA; 24H; 3	NUR; 3	MNZ; 1	JED; 4	3rd	95	3rd	95
2025	(France) Thomas Drouet	Ford Mustang GT3	P	64 (Note: Entered as HRT Ford Performance)	1–3	LEC; 11	MNZ; Ret	SPA; 6H	SPA; 12H	SPA; 24H	NUR	BAR	NC	0	13th	1
2025	(India) Arjun Maini	Ford Mustang GT3	P	64	1–3	LEC; 11	MNZ; Ret	SPA; 6H	SPA; 12H	SPA; 24H	NUR	BAR	NC	0	13th	1
2025	(United Kingdom) Jann Mardenborough	Ford Mustang GT3	P	64	1–3	LEC; 11	MNZ; Ret	SPA; 6H	SPA; 12H	SPA; 24H	NUR	BAR	NC	0	13th	1
2025	(France) Romain Andriolo	Ford Mustang GT3	S	65	1–3	LEC; 9	MNZ; 5	SPA; 6H	SPA; 12H	SPA; 24H	NUR	BAR	10th	12	9th	12
2025	(Germany) David Schumacher	Ford Mustang GT3	S	65	1–3	LEC; 9	MNZ; 5	SPA; 6H	SPA; 12H	SPA; 24H	NUR	BAR	10th	12	9th	12
2025	(Germany) Finn Wiebelhaus	Ford Mustang GT3	S	65	1–3	LEC; 9	MNZ; 5	SPA; 6H	SPA; 12H	SPA; 24H	NUR	BAR	10th	12	9th	12
2025	(Germany) Salman Owega	Ford Mustang GT3	S	65	3	LEC	MNZ	SPA; 6H	SPA; 12H	SPA; 24H	NUR	BAR			9th	12

=== Complete Nürburgring 24 Hours results ===
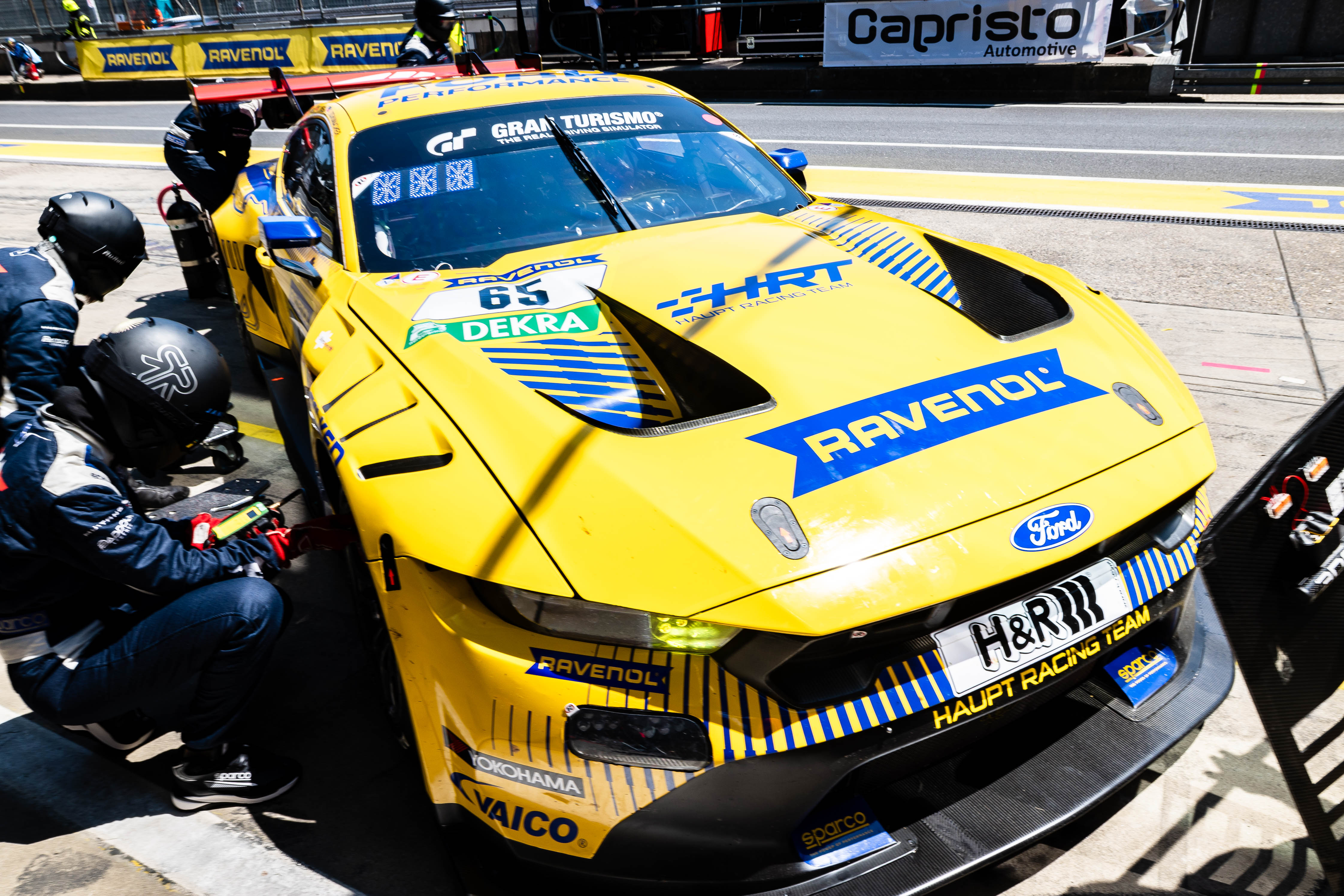
Ford Mustang GT3 for HRT Ford Performance in the 2025 24 Hours of Nürburgring.

Year	Entrant	No.	Car	Drivers	Class	Laps	Pos.	Class Pos.
2020	(Germany) Mercedes-AMG Team HRT	2	Mercedes-AMG GT3 Evo	(Netherlands) Yelmer Buurman (Germany) Nico Bastian (United Kingdom) Philip Ellis (Germany) Hubert Haupt	SP9	84	9th	9th
2020	(Germany) Mercedes-AMG Team HRT	4	Mercedes-AMG GT3 Evo	(United Kingdom) Adam Christodoulou (Germany) Maro Engel (Switzerland) Manuel Metzger (Germany) Luca Stolz	SP9	28	Ret	Ret
2020	(Germany) Mercedes-AMG Team HRT AutoArena	6	Mercedes-AMG GT3 Evo	(Germany) Patrick Assenheimer (Austria) Dominik Baumann (Germany) Maro Engel (Germany) Dirk Müller	SP9	85	8th	8th
2021	(Germany) Mercedes-AMG Team Bilstein	4	Mercedes-AMG GT3 Evo	(United Kingdom) Adam Christodoulou (Germany) Maro Engel (Switzerland) Manuel Metzger (Germany) Luca Stolz	SP9	37	Ret	Ret
2021	(Germany) Mercedes-AMG Team HRT	6	Mercedes-AMG GT3 Evo	(Germany) Patrick Assenheimer (Germany) Nico Bastian (Germany) Maro Engel (Germany) Hubert Haupt	SP9	46	Ret	Ret
2022	(Germany) Mercedes-AMG Team Bilstein	6	Mercedes-AMG GT3 Evo	(Germany) Nico Bastian (Germany) Hubert Haupt (Italy) Gabriele Piana (Germany) Marvin Dienst	SP9 Pro-Am	158	8th	**1st**
2022	(Germany) Mercedes-AMG Team Bilstein	12	Mercedes-AMG GT3 Evo	(Switzerland) Philip Ellis (Switzerland) Raffaele Marciello (Germany) Luca Stolz	SP9 Pro	158	7th	7th
2023	(Germany) Mercedes-AMG Team Bilstein	4	Mercedes-AMG GT3 Evo	(Switzerland) Philip Ellis (Switzerland) Raffaele Marciello (Germany) Luca Stolz (Switzerland) Edoardo Mortara	SP9 Pro	162	**3rd**	**3rd**
2023	(Germany) Mercedes-AMG Team Bilstein	6	Mercedes-AMG GT3 Evo	(Germany) Hubert Haupt (Australia) Jordan Love (India) Arjun Maini	SP9 Pro-Am	161	8th	**2nd**
2023	(Germany) Mercedes-AMG Team HRT	46	Mercedes-AMG GT2	(United Kingdom) Frank Bird (Germany) Elia Erhart (Germany) Thomas Jäger (Germany) Jörg Viebahn	SP-X	WD?	WD?	WD?
2023	(Germany) Haupt Racing Team	89	Mercedes-AMG GT4	(Germany) Alexander Kroker (Germany) Reinhold Renger (Germany) Tim-Florian Wahl (Germany) Tobias Wahl	SP10	WD?	WD?	WD?
2024	(Germany) Mercedes-AMG Team Bilstein	3	Mercedes-AMG GT3 Evo	(Italy) Michele Beretta (United Kingdom) Frank Bird (India) Arjun Maini (Germany) Jusuf Owega	SP9 Pro	45	8th	8th
2024	(Germany) Mercedes-AMG Team HRT	4	Mercedes-AMG GT3 Evo	(Germany) Maximilian Götz (Spain) Daniel Juncadella (India) Arjun Maini (Germany) Luca Stolz	SP9 Pro	45	4th	4th
2024	(Germany) Team Advan x HRT	6	Mercedes-AMG GT3 Evo	(Estonia) Ralf Aron (Germany) Dennis Fetzer (Germany) Hubert Haupt (Germany) Salman Owega	SP9 Pro-Am	44	17th	**3rd**
2025	(Germany) HRT Ford Performance	63	Ford Mustang GT3	(Germany) Patrick Assenheimer (Germany) Hubert Haupt (Germany) Vincent Kolb (Germany) Dirk Müller	SP9 Pro-Am	52	Ret	Ret
2025	(Germany) HRT Ford Performance	64	Ford Mustang GT3	(India) Arjun Maini (Norway) Dennis Olsen (Germany) Jusuf Owega (Germany) Frank Stippler	SP9 Pro	27	Ret	Ret
2025	(Germany) HRT Ford Performance	65	Ford Mustang GT3	(Germany) Dennis Fetzer (Germany) Jusuf Owega (Germany) Salman Owega (Germany) David Schumacher	SP9 Pro-Am	140	4th	**1st**

=== Complete Asian Le Mans Series results ===
Year	Drivers	Car	Class	No.	Rds.	Rounds						Pos.	Pts.	Pos.	Pts.
Year	Drivers	Car	Class	No.	Rds.	1	2	3	4	5	6	Pos.	Pts.	Pos.	Pts.
2022	(Germany) Hubert Haupt	Mercedes-AMG GT3 Evo	GT	6	All	DUB; 1; 7	DUB; 2; 9	ABU; 1; 9	ABU; 2; 7			9th	16	9th	16
2022	(India) Arjun Maini	Mercedes-AMG GT3 Evo	GT	6	All	DUB; 1; 7	DUB; 2; 9	ABU; 1; 9	ABU; 2; 7			9th	16	9th	16
2022	(Finland) Rory Penttinen	Mercedes-AMG GT3 Evo	GT	6	All	DUB; 1; 7	DUB; 2; 9	ABU; 1; 9	ABU; 2; 7			9th	16	9th	16
2023	(United Kingdom) Frank Bird	Mercedes-AMG GT3 Evo	GT	6	All	DUB; 1; 7	DUB; 2; 15	ABU; 1; 13	ABU; 2 Ret			15th	6	14th	6
2023	(France) Michael Blanchemain	Mercedes-AMG GT3 Evo	GT	6	All	DUB; 1; 7	DUB; 2; 15	ABU; 1; 13	ABU; 2 Ret			15th	6	14th	6
2023	(India) Arjun Maini	Mercedes-AMG GT3 Evo	GT	6	All	DUB; 1; 7	DUB; 2; 15	ABU; 1; 13	ABU; 2 Ret			15th	6	14th	6
2023	(Oman) Al Faisal Al Zubair	Mercedes-AMG GT3 Evo	GT	7	All	DUB; 1; 3	DUB; 2; 7	ABU; 1; 1	ABU; 2; 1			2nd	71	2nd	71
2023	(Austria) Martin Konrad	Mercedes-AMG GT3 Evo	GT	7	All	DUB; 1; 3	DUB; 2; 7	ABU; 1; 1	ABU; 2; 1			2nd	71	2nd	71
2023	(Germany) Luca Stolz	Mercedes-AMG GT3 Evo	GT	7	All	DUB; 1; 3	DUB; 2; 7	ABU; 1; 1	ABU; 2; 1			2nd	71	2nd	71

=== Complete Dubai 24 Hour results ===
Year	Entrant	No.	Car	Drivers	Class	Laps	Pos.	Class Pos.
2021	(Germany) HRT Bilstein	4	Mercedes-AMG GT3 Evo	(United Arab Emirates) Khaled Al Qubaisi (Germany) Patrick Assenheimer (Germany) Maro Engel (Germany) Hubert Haupt (United Kingdom) Ryan Ratcliffe	GT3	599	**3rd**	**3rd**
2021	(United Arab Emirates) HRT Abu Dhabi Racing	5	Mercedes-AMG GT3 Evo	(United Arab Emirates) Khaled Al Qubaisi (Germany) Patrick Assenheimer (Germany) Nico Bastian (Germany) Valentin Pierburg (Germany) Florian Scholze	GT3 Am	592	5th	**1st**
2022	(United Arab Emirates) Abu Dhabi Racing by HRT	4	Mercedes-AMG GT3 Evo	(United Arab Emirates) Khaled Al Qubaisi (Germany) Hubert Haupt (Switzerland) Raffaele Marciello (Germany) Manuel Metzger	GT3	593	4th	4th
2022	(Oman) Al Manar Racing by HRT	777	Mercedes-AMG GT3 Evo	(Oman) Al Faisal Al Zubair (Netherlands) Indy Dontje (Austria) Martin Konrad (Germany) Luca Stolz	GT3	589	5th	5th
2023	(United Arab Emirates) Abu Dhabi Racing by HRT	4	Mercedes-AMG GT3 Evo	(United Arab Emirates) Khaled Al Qubaisi (France) Sébastien Baud (Andorra) Jules Gounon (Germany) Hubert Haupt	GT3	115	Ret	Ret
2023	(Oman) Al Manar Racing by HRT	777	Mercedes-AMG GT3 Evo	(Oman) Al Faisal Al Zubair (Zimbabwe) Axcil Jefferies (Austria) Martin Konrad (Germany) Fabian Schiller (Germany) Luca Stolz	GT3	136	Ret	Ret
2025	(Germany) Haupt Racing Team	4	Mercedes-AMG GT3 Evo	(France) Romain Andriolo (Germany) Hubert Haupt (Saudi Arabia) Reema Juffali (Germany) Salman Owega	GT3 Am	575	6th	6th
2025	(Germany) SMP Racing (Note: SMP Racing is a Russian team, but they compete under a German flag as Russian national emblems were banned by the FIA following the Russian invasion of Ukraine.)	7	Mercedes-AMG GT3 Evo	Vitaly Petrov; Dennis Remenyako; Sergey Sirotkin (Kyrgyzstan) Kirill Smal; Alexander Smolyar	GT3	586	4th	4th

Colour	Result
Gold	Winner
Silver	Second place
Bronze	Third place
Green	Points classification
Blue	Non-points classification
Blue	Non-classified finish (NC)
Purple	Retired, not classified (Ret)
Red	Did not qualify (DNQ)
Red	Did not pre-qualify (DNPQ)
Black	Disqualified (DSQ)
White	Did not start (DNS)
White	Withdrew (WD)
White	Race cancelled (C)
Blank	Did not practice (DNP)
Blank	Did not arrive (DNA)
Blank	Excluded (EX)

Bold – Pole
Italics – Fastest Lap
1 – 3 Points for Pole
2 – 2 Points for P2
3 – 1 Point for P3
