= 2025 GT Winter Series =

Motor racing tournament season

The 2025 GT Winter Series was the fifth season of the GT Winter Series, a grand tourer motor racing championship organised by Gedlich Racing. It started at 16 January in Circuito do Estoril and finished at 9 March in Circuit de Barcelona-Catalunya.

== Calendar ==
Each event consists of three races; two races of 30mins, and one of 55mins with a mandatory pit-stop.

Round	Circuit	Date	Supporting	Map of circuit locations
1	Circuito do Estoril, Estoril, Portugal	16–19 January	GT4 Winter Series; Prototype Winter Series	2025 GT Winter Series is located in Iberia
2	Algarve International Circuit, Portimão, Portugal	23–26 January	GT4 Winter Series; Prototype Winter Series	2025 GT Winter Series is located in Iberia
3	Circuit Ricardo Tormo, Cheste, Spain	13–16 February	Formula Winter Series; GT4 Winter Series; TCR Spain	2025 GT Winter Series is located in Iberia
4	MotorLand Aragón, Alcañiz, Spain	27 February–2 March	Formula Winter Series; GT4 Winter Series; Prototype Winter Series	2025 GT Winter Series is located in Iberia
5	Circuit de Barcelona-Catalunya, Montmeló, Spain	6–9 March	Formula Winter Series; GT4 Winter Series; Prototype Winter Series	2025 GT Winter Series is located in Iberia

== Classes ==
Class
GT2	For FIA and SRO-homologated Group GT2 cars.
GT3 GT3 Pro	For FIA Group GT3 cars. For GT3 cars with at least one Gold driver.
Cup 1	For Ferrari 296 Challenge cars.
Cup 2	For Porsche 911 GT3 Cup cars.
Cup 3	For McLaren Artura Trophy and 570S Trophy cars.
Cup 4	For Lamborghini Huracán Super Trofeo cars.
Cup 5	For Ferrari 458 Challenge, 488 Challenge and 488 Challenge Evo cars.
Cup X	For every car not mentioned in other classes that fits in the performance window.

== Entry list ==
Team	Car	Engine	No.	Drivers	Class	Rounds
GT2
(Spain) NM Racing Team	Mercedes-AMG GT2	Mercedes-AMG M178 4.0 L Twin-Turbo V8	15	(Spain) Alberto de Martin		3, 5
(Spain) NM Racing Team	Mercedes-AMG GT2	Mercedes-AMG M178 4.0 L Twin-Turbo V8	15	(Spain) Manel Lao		3, 5
GT3
(Germany) SR Motorsport by Schnitzelalm	Mercedes-AMG GT3 Evo	Mercedes-AMG M159 6.2 L V8	1	(Germany) Kenneth Heyer		All
(Germany) SR Motorsport by Schnitzelalm	Mercedes-AMG GT3 Evo	Mercedes-AMG M159 6.2 L V8	1	(Germany) Moritz Wiskirchen		All
(Germany) Liqui Moly Team Engstler	Lamborghini Huracán GT3 Evo 2	Lamborghini DGF 5.2 L V10	8	(Germany) Luca Engstler	P	3–5
(Germany) Liqui Moly Team Engstler	Lamborghini Huracán GT3 Evo 2	Lamborghini DGF 5.2 L V10	8	(Lithuania) Jonas Karklys	P	3–4
(Germany) Liqui Moly Team Engstler	Lamborghini Huracán GT3 Evo 2	Lamborghini DGF 5.2 L V10	8	(Netherlands) Dante Rappange	P	5
(Austria) Konrad Motorsport	Lamborghini Huracán GT3 Evo	Lamborghini DGF 5.2 L V10	11	(Germany) Carrie Schreiner		3–5
(Austria) Konrad Motorsport	Lamborghini Huracán GT3 Evo	Lamborghini DGF 5.2 L V10	11	(United States) Danny Soufi		3–5
(Austria) Razoon - more than racing	Porsche 911 GT3 R (992)	Porsche M97/80 4.2 L Flat-6	14	(Denmark) Thomas Andersen		2, 4
(Austria) Razoon - more than racing	Porsche 911 GT3 R (992)	Porsche M97/80 4.2 L Flat-6	14	(Denmark) Simon Birch		2, 4–5
(Austria) Razoon - more than racing	Porsche 911 GT3 R (992)	Porsche M97/80 4.2 L Flat-6	14	(Austria) Leo Pichler		5
(Germany) PROsport Racing	Aston Martin Vantage AMR GT3 Evo	Aston Martin M177 4.0 L Turbo V8	17	(Germany) Adrian Rziczny		5
(Germany) PROsport Racing	Aston Martin Vantage AMR GT3 Evo	Aston Martin M177 4.0 L Turbo V8	17	(Liechtenstein) Fabienne Wohlwend		5
(Italy) Pellin Racing	Ferrari 488 GT3 Evo 2020	Ferrari F154CB 3.9 L Turbo V8	23	(United States) Thor Haugen		2
(Italy) Pellin Racing	Ferrari 488 GT3 Evo 2020	Ferrari F154CB 3.9 L Turbo V8	23	(Italy) Paolo Ruberti		2
(Lithuania) Juta Racing	Audi R8 LMS Evo II	Audi DAR 5.2 L V10	24	(Lithuania) Jonas Gelžinis		4
(Lithuania) Juta Racing	Audi R8 LMS Evo II	Audi DAR 5.2 L V10	24	(Lithuania) Eimantas Navikauskas		4
(Germany) CBRX by SPS Automotive Performance	Mercedes-AMG GT3 Evo	Mercedes-AMG M159 6.2 L V8	54	(Switzerland) Dexter Müller		1–2
(San Marino) AKM Motorsport	Mercedes-AMG GT3 Evo	Mercedes-AMG M159 6.2 L V8	64	(United Kingdom) Charles Dawson		4
(San Marino) AKM Motorsport	Mercedes-AMG GT3 Evo	Mercedes-AMG M159 6.2 L V8	64	(United States) Aaron Farhadi		4
(United Kingdom) Orange Racing by JMH Automotive	McLaren 720S GT3	McLaren M840T 4.0 L Turbo V8	67	(United Kingdom) Marcus Clutton		4–5
(United Kingdom) Orange Racing by JMH Automotive	McLaren 720S GT3	McLaren M840T 4.0 L Turbo V8	67	(United Kingdom) Simon Orange		4–5
(Belgium) BDR Competition by Grupoprom	Mercedes-AMG GT3 Evo	Mercedes-AMG M159 6.2 L V8	77	(Mexico) Alfredo Hernández Ortega		1–3, 5
(Germany) SSR Performance	Porsche 911 GT3 R (992)	Porsche M97/80 4.2 L Flat-6	92	(United Arab Emirates) Keanu Al Azhari		2
(Belgium) Comtoyou Racing	Aston Martin Vantage AMR GT3 Evo	Aston Martin M177 4.0 L Turbo V8	270	(Brazil) Ricardo Baptista		3
(Belgium) Comtoyou Racing	Aston Martin Vantage AMR GT3 Evo	Aston Martin M177 4.0 L Turbo V8	270	(Brazil) Rafael Suzuki		3
(Belgium) Comtoyou Racing	Aston Martin Vantage AMR GT3 Evo	Aston Martin M177 4.0 L Turbo V8	700	(Belgium) Matisse Lismont		3, 5
(Belgium) Comtoyou Racing	Aston Martin Vantage AMR GT3 Evo	Aston Martin M177 4.0 L Turbo V8	700	(Belgium) Kobe Pauwels		3, 5
Cup 1
(Italy) AF Corse	Ferrari 296 Challenge	Ferrari F163 3.0 L Turbo V6	9	(Germany) Danilo del Favero		5
(Italy) AF Corse	Ferrari 296 Challenge	Ferrari F163 3.0 L Turbo V6	50	(Portugal) Rui Águas		All
(Italy) AF Corse	Ferrari 296 Challenge	Ferrari F163 3.0 L Turbo V6	50	(Portugal) Christiano Maciel		All
(Italy) AF Corse	Ferrari 296 Challenge	Ferrari F163 3.0 L Turbo V6	76	(Denmark) Andreas Bøgh-Sorensen		1–2, 4–5
(Italy) AF Corse	Ferrari 296 Challenge	Ferrari F163 3.0 L Turbo V6	76	(Denmark) Mikkel Mac		2, 4–5
(Italy) AF Corse	Ferrari 296 Challenge	Ferrari F163 3.0 L Turbo V6	76	(Denmark) Benny Simonsen		1
(Italy) AF Corse	Ferrari 296 Challenge	Ferrari F163 3.0 L Turbo V6	99	(Italy) Nicola Caldani		2–3
(Italy) AF Corse	Ferrari 296 Challenge	Ferrari F163 3.0 L Turbo V6	99	(Spain) Alberto Duran		2–3
(Italy) AF Corse	Ferrari 296 Challenge	Ferrari F163 3.0 L Turbo V6	101	(Italy) Stefano Gai		3
(Italy) AF Corse	Ferrari 296 Challenge	Ferrari F163 3.0 L Turbo V6	101	(Italy) Paolo Scudieri		3
(Italy) AF Corse	Ferrari 296 Challenge	Ferrari F163 3.0 L Turbo V6	124	(Italy) Max Blancardi		3
(Italy) AF Corse	Ferrari 296 Challenge	Ferrari F163 3.0 L Turbo V6	124	(Lebanon) Talal Shair		3
(Italy) AF Corse	Ferrari 296 Challenge	Ferrari F163 3.0 L Turbo V6	127	(Spain) Rafael Durán		2–3
(Italy) AF Corse	Ferrari 296 Challenge	Ferrari F163 3.0 L Turbo V6	127	(Singapore) Sean Hudspeth		2–3
(Italy) AF Corse	Ferrari 296 Challenge	Ferrari F163 3.0 L Turbo V6	151	(United Kingdom) John Dhillon		2–3, 5
(Italy) AF Corse	Ferrari 296 Challenge	Ferrari F163 3.0 L Turbo V6	151	(Republic of Ireland) Matt Griffin		2–3, 5
(Italy) AF Corse	Ferrari 296 Challenge	Ferrari F163 3.0 L Turbo V6	175	(Italy) Andrea Gagliardini		3
(Italy) AF Corse	Ferrari 296 Challenge	Ferrari F163 3.0 L Turbo V6	175	(Germany) Sven Schömer		3
(Italy) AF Corse	Ferrari 296 Challenge	Ferrari F163 3.0 L Turbo V6	198	(Canada) Eric Cheung		3, 5
(Italy) AF Corse	Ferrari 296 Challenge	Ferrari F163 3.0 L Turbo V6	198	(Italy) Daniele Di Amato		3, 5
(Germany) Liqui Moly Team Engstler	Ferrari 296 Challenge	Ferrari F163 3.0 L Turbo V6	26	(Austria) Alois Meir		3
(Germany) Liqui Moly Team Engstler	Ferrari 296 Challenge	Ferrari F163 3.0 L Turbo V6	26	(United Kingdom) James Owen		3
(Denmark) DC Motorsport	Ferrari 296 Challenge	Ferrari F163 3.0 L Turbo V6	29	(Denmark) Anders Bidstrup		3
(Germany) Mertel Motorsport	Ferrari 296 Challenge	Ferrari F163 3.0 L Turbo V6	80	(United Kingdom) Oscar Ryndziewicz		2–3
(Germany) Mertel Motorsport	Ferrari 296 Challenge	Ferrari F163 3.0 L Turbo V6	81	(Germany) Antoine Berberich-Martini		2
(Germany) Mertel Motorsport	Ferrari 296 Challenge	Ferrari F163 3.0 L Turbo V6	81	(Germany) Luca Ludwig		2
(Italy) Reparto Corse RAM	Ferrari 296 Challenge	Ferrari F163 3.0 L Turbo V6	115	(Japan) Shintaro Akatsu		3
(Italy) Reparto Corse RAM	Ferrari 296 Challenge	Ferrari F163 3.0 L Turbo V6	168	(United Kingdom) Germana Tognella		3
(Italy) Reparto Corse RAM	Ferrari 296 Challenge	Ferrari F163 3.0 L Turbo V6	168	(Greece) Zois Skrimpias		3
(Portugal) Araújo Competição	Ferrari 296 Challenge	Ferrari F163 3.0 L Turbo V6	150	(Portugal) Gonçalo Araújo		1, 3, 5
(Portugal) Araújo Competição	Ferrari 296 Challenge	Ferrari F163 3.0 L Turbo V6	150	(Portugal) Álvaro Ramos		1, 3, 5
Cup 2
(Poland) PTT Racing	Porsche 992 GT3 Cup	Porsche 4.0 L Flat-6	7	(Poland) Hubert Darmetko		3–5
(Poland) PTT Racing	Porsche 992 GT3 Cup	Porsche 4.0 L Flat-6	7	(Poland) Fabian Dybionka		5
(Poland) PTT Racing	Porsche 992 GT3 Cup	Porsche 4.0 L Flat-6	27	(Poland) Przemysław Bieńkowski		All
(Poland) PTT Racing	Porsche 992 GT3 Cup	Porsche 4.0 L Flat-6	27	(Poland) Mateusz Lisowski		2–4
(Poland) PTT Racing	Porsche 992 GT3 Cup	Porsche 4.0 L Flat-6	33	(Poland) Fabian Dybionka		5
(Germany) Plusline Racing Team	Porsche 992 GT3 Cup	Porsche 4.0 L Flat-6	38	(Germany) Joachim Bölting		1, 3
(Sweden) Wileco Motorsport	Porsche 992 GT3 Cup	Porsche 4.0 L Flat-6	44	(Sweden) Calle Bergman		All
(Sweden) Wileco Motorsport	Porsche 992 GT3 Cup	Porsche 4.0 L Flat-6	44	(Sweden) Månz Thalin		All
(Germany) a-workx motorsport	Porsche 992 GT3 Cup	Porsche 4.0 L Flat-6	88	(United Arab Emirates) Ahmed Arif Alkhoori		4–5
(Poland) Förch Racing by Atlas Ward	Porsche 992 GT3 Cup	Porsche 4.0 L Flat-6	214	(Poland) Jakub Twaróg		3, 5
(Poland) Förch Racing by Atlas Ward	Porsche 992 GT3 Cup	Porsche 4.0 L Flat-6	214	(Poland) Karol Kręt		5
(Poland) Förch Racing by Atlas Ward	Porsche 992 GT3 Cup	Porsche 4.0 L Flat-6	215	(Poland) Mariusz Górecki		3
(Poland) Förch Racing by Atlas Ward	Porsche 992 GT3 Cup	Porsche 4.0 L Flat-6	215	(Poland) Karol Kręt		3
(Portugal) Racar Motorsport	Porsche 992 GT3 Cup	Porsche 4.0 L Flat-6	911	(Portugal) Leandro Martins		1–2
(Portugal) Racar Motorsport	Porsche 992 GT3 Cup	Porsche 4.0 L Flat-6	911	(Austria) Dieter Svepes		1–2
(Austria) MS Racing	Porsche 992 GT3 Cup	Porsche 4.0 L Flat-6	TBA	TBA		TBC
Cup 3
(United Kingdom) Greystone GT	McLaren Artura Trophy	McLaren M630 3.0 L Turbo V6	22	(United Kingdom) Ryan James		2–4
(United Kingdom) Greystone GT	McLaren Artura Trophy	McLaren M630 3.0 L Turbo V6	22	(United Kingdom) Oliver Webb		2–4
(United Kingdom) Greystone GT	McLaren Artura Trophy	McLaren M630 3.0 L Turbo V6	170	(United Kingdom) Jayden Kelly		5
(United Kingdom) Greystone GT	McLaren Artura Trophy	McLaren M630 3.0 L Turbo V6	170	(Australia) Mark Kempster		5
(Austria) MS Racing	McLaren Artura Trophy	McLaren M630 3.0 L Turbo V6	128	(Germany) Andreas Greiling		3
Cup 4
(Kazakhstan) ART-Line	Lamborghini Huracán Super Trofeo Evo 2	Lamborghini 5.2 L V10	12	(Kazakhstan) Shota Abkhazava		4–5
(Poland) UNIQ Racing	Lamborghini Huracán Super Trofeo Evo 2	Lamborghini 5.2 L V10	25	(Poland) Jerzy Spinkiewicz		1–2, 4–5
(Italy) Auto Sport Racing	Lamborghini Huracán Super Trofeo Evo 2	Lamborghini 5.2 L V10	32	(Serbia) Alex Beatović		1–4
(Italy) Auto Sport Racing	Lamborghini Huracán Super Trofeo Evo 2	Lamborghini 5.2 L V10	32	(Serbia) Petar Matić		3–4
(Italy) Auto Sport Racing	Lamborghini Huracán Super Trofeo Evo 2	Lamborghini 5.2 L V10	333	(Serbia) Miloš Pavlović		All
(Italy) Auto Sport Racing	Lamborghini Huracán Super Trofeo Evo 2	Lamborghini 5.2 L V10	333	(Italy) Alessio Ruffini		All
GT3 Poland	Lamborghini Huracán Super Trofeo Evo 2	Lamborghini 5.2 L V10	79	(Poland) Seweryn Mazur		1–3
(Denmark) DC Motorsport	Lamborghini Huracán Super Trofeo Evo 2	Lamborghini 5.2 L V10	218	(Denmark) Steen Almsgaard		3
(Denmark) DC Motorsport	Lamborghini Huracán Super Trofeo Evo 2	Lamborghini 5.2 L V10	477	(Denmark) Ulrik Larsen		3
Cup 5
(Italy) AF Corse	Ferrari 488 Challenge Evo	Ferrari F154CB 3.9 L Turbo V8	5	(Republic of Ireland) Sean Doyle		2–3, 5
(Italy) AF Corse	Ferrari 488 Challenge Evo	Ferrari F154CB 3.9 L Turbo V8	5	(United Kingdom) Darren Howell		2–3, 5
(Italy) AF Corse	Ferrari 488 Challenge Evo	Ferrari F154CB 3.9 L Turbo V8	117	(Italy) Giuseppe Casillo		3
(Italy) AF Corse	Ferrari 488 Challenge Evo	Ferrari F154CB 3.9 L Turbo V8	117	(Italy) Stefano Gai		3
(Denmark) DC Motorsport	Ferrari 488 Challenge Evo	Ferrari F154CB 3.9 L Turbo V8	40	(Denmark) Jacob Bidstrup		3
(Germany) Mertel Motorsport	Ferrari 488 Challenge Evo	Ferrari F154CB 3.9 L Turbo V8	80	(United Kingdom) Oscar Ryndziewicz		1
Cup X
(Austria) MZR	KTM X-Bow GT2	Audi 2.5 L I5	889	(Switzerland) Simon Willner		2
Invitational
(Germany) Schubert Motorsport	BMW M4 GT3 Evo	BMW S58B30T0 3.0 L Turbo V8	56	(Germany) Juliano Holzem		3, 5
(Germany) Schubert Motorsport	BMW M4 GT3 Evo	BMW S58B30T0 3.0 L Turbo V8	56	(Germany) Sandro Holzem		3, 5

Icon	Class
P	GT3 Pro

== Results ==
Bold indicates overall winner.

Round	Circuit		Pole position	GT2 Winners	GT3 Winners	GT3 Pro Winners	Cup 1 Winners	Cup 2 Winners	Cup 3 Winners	Cup 4 Winners	Cup 5 Winners	Cup X Winners	Invitational Winners
1	R1	(Portugal) Circuito do Estoril	(Poland) No. 25 UNIQ Racing	No entries	(Germany) No. 54 CBRX by SPS Automotive Performance	No entries	(Italy) No. 76 AF Corse	(Portugal) No. 911 Racar Motorsport	No entries	**No. 79 GT3 Poland**	(Germany) No. 80 Mertel Motorsport	No entries	No entries
1	R1	(Portugal) Circuito do Estoril	(Poland) Jerzy Spinkiewicz	No entries	(Switzerland) Dexter Müller	No entries	(Denmark) Andreas Bøgh-Sorensen (Denmark) Benny Simonsen	(Portugal) Leandro Martins (Austria) Dieter Svepes	No entries	**(Poland) Seweryn Mazur**	(United Kingdom) Oscar Ryndziewicz	No entries	No entries
1	R2	(Portugal) Circuito do Estoril	(Germany) No. 1 SR Motorsport by Schnitzelalm	No entries	(Germany) No. 1 SR Motorsport by Schnitzelalm	No entries	**(Italy) No. 50 AF Corse**	(Sweden) No. 44 Wileco Motorsport	No entries	(Poland) No. 25 UNIQ Racing	(Germany) No. 80 Mertel Motorsport	No entries	No entries
1	R2	(Portugal) Circuito do Estoril	(Germany) Kenneth Heyer (Germany) Moritz Wiskirchen	No entries	(Germany) Kenneth Heyer (Germany) Moritz Wiskirchen	No entries	**(Portugal) Rui Águas** **(Portugal) Cristiano Maciel**	(Sweden) Calle Bergman (Sweden) Månz Thalin	No entries	(Poland) Jerzy Spinkiewicz	(United Kingdom) Oscar Ryndziewicz	No entries	No entries
1	R3	(Portugal) Circuito do Estoril	(Germany) No. 1 SR Motorsport by Schnitzelalm	No entries	(Germany) No. 1 SR Motorsport by Schnitzelalm	No entries	**(Italy) No. 76 AF Corse**	(Sweden) No. 44 Wileco Motorsport	No entries	(Poland) No. 25 UNIQ Racing	(Germany) No. 80 Mertel Motorsport	No entries	No entries
1	R3	(Portugal) Circuito do Estoril	(Germany) Kenneth Heyer (Germany) Moritz Wiskirchen	No entries	(Germany) Kenneth Heyer (Germany) Moritz Wiskirchen	No entries	**(Denmark) Andreas Bøgh-Sorensen** **(Denmark) Benny Simonsen**	(Sweden) Calle Bergman (Sweden) Månz Thalin	No entries	(Poland) Jerzy Spinkiewicz	(United Kingdom) Oscar Ryndziewicz	No entries	No entries
2	R1	(Portugal) Algarve International Circuit	(Germany) No. 1 SR Motorsport by Schnitzelalm (Note: Originally the car No. 92 got the pole position, but it received a 5-place grid drop penalty for setting the fastest lap during the yellow flag period.)	No entries	**(Germany) No. 92 SSR Performance**	No entries	(Italy) No. 50 AF Corse	(Sweden) No. 44 Wileco Motorsport	(United Kingdom) No. 22 Greystone GT	(Poland) No. 25 UNIQ Racing	(Italy) No. 5 AF Corse	(Austria) No. 889 MZR	No entries
2	R1	(Portugal) Algarve International Circuit	(Germany) Kenneth Heyer (Germany) Moritz Wiskirchen	No entries	**(United Arab Emirates) Keanu Al Azhari**	No entries	(Portugal) Rui Águas (Portugal) Cristiano Maciel	(Sweden) Calle Bergman (Sweden) Månz Thalin	(United Kingdom) Ryan James (United Kingdom) Oliver Webb	(Poland) Jerzy Spinkiewicz	(Republic of Ireland) Sean Doyle (United Kingdom) Darren Howell	(Switzerland) Simon Willner	No entries
2	R2	(Portugal) Algarve International Circuit	(Germany) No. 92 SSR Performance	No entries	**(Germany) No. 92 SSR Performance**	No entries	(Italy) No. 127 AF Corse	(Portugal) No. 911 Racar Motorsport	(United Kingdom) No. 22 Greystone GT	(Poland) No. 25 UNIQ Racing	(Italy) No. 5 AF Corse	(Austria) No. 889 MZR	No entries
2	R2	(Portugal) Algarve International Circuit	(United Arab Emirates) Keanu Al Azhari	No entries	**(United Arab Emirates) Keanu Al Azhari**	No entries	(Spain) Rafael Durán (Singapore) Sean Hudspeth	(Portugal) Leandro Martins (Austria) Dieter Svepes	(United Kingdom) Ryan James (United Kingdom) Oliver Webb	(Poland) Jerzy Spinkiewicz	(Republic of Ireland) Sean Doyle (United Kingdom) Darren Howell	(Switzerland) Simon Willner	No entries
2	R3	(Portugal) Algarve International Circuit	(Austria) No. 14 Razoon - more than racing	No entries	(Austria) No. 14 Razoon - more than racing	No entries	**(Italy) No. 151 AF Corse**	(Poland) No. 27 PTT Racing	(United Kingdom) No. 22 Greystone GT	(Poland) No. 25 UNIQ Racing	(Italy) No. 5 AF Corse	No starters	No entries
2	R3	(Portugal) Algarve International Circuit	(Denmark) Thomas Andersen (Denmark) Simon Birch	No entries	(Denmark) Thomas Andersen (Denmark) Simon Birch	No entries	**(United Kingdom) John Dhillon** **(Republic of Ireland) Matt Griffin**	(Poland) Przemysław Bieńkowski (Poland) Mateusz Lisowski	(United Kingdom) Ryan James (United Kingdom) Oliver Webb	(Poland) Jerzy Spinkiewicz	(Republic of Ireland) Sean Doyle (United Kingdom) Darren Howell	No starters	No entries
3	R1	(Spain) Circuit Ricardo Tormo	(Germany) No. 56 Schubert Motorsport	(Spain) No. 15 NM Racing	(Belgium) No. 700 Comtoyou Racing	(Germany) No. 8 Liqui Moly Team Engstler	(Denmark) No. 29 DC Motorsport	(Poland) No. 7 PTT Racing	(United Kingdom) No. 22 Greystone GT	(Denmark) No. 477 DC Motorsport	(Denmark) No. 40 DC Motorsport	No entries	**(Germany) No. 56 Schubert Motorsport**
3	R1	(Spain) Circuit Ricardo Tormo	(Germany) Juliano Holzem (Germany) Sandro Holzem	(Spain) Alberto de Martin (Spain) Manel Lao	(Belgium) Matisse Lismont (Belgium) Kobe Pauwels	(Germany) Luca Engstler (Lithuania) Jonas Karklys	(Denmark) Anders Bidstrup	(Poland) Hubert Darmetko	(United Kingdom) Ryan James (United Kingdom) Oliver Webb	(Denmark) Ulrik Larsen	(Denmark) Jacob Bidstrup	No entries	**(Germany) Juliano Holzem** **(Germany) Sandro Holzem**
3	R2	(Spain) Circuit Ricardo Tormo	(Germany) No. 8 Liqui Moly Team Engstler	(Spain) No. 15 NM Racing	(Austria) No. 11 Konrad Motorsport	**(Germany) No. 8 Liqui Moly Team Engstler**	(Portugal) No. 150 Araújo Competição	(Poland) No. 7 PTT Racing	(United Kingdom) No. 22 Greystone GT	No. 79 GT3 Poland	(Denmark) No. 40 DC Motorsport	No entries	(Germany) No. 56 Schubert Motorsport
3	R2	(Spain) Circuit Ricardo Tormo	(Germany) Luca Engstler (Lithuania) Jonas Karklys	(Spain) Alberto de Martin (Spain) Manel Lao	(Germany) Carrie Schreiner (United States) Danny Soufi	**(Germany) Luca Engstler** **(Lithuania) Jonas Karklys**	(Portugal) Gonçalo Araújo (Portugal) Álvaro Ramos	(Poland) Hubert Darmetko	(United Kingdom) Ryan James (United Kingdom) Oliver Webb	(Poland) Seweryn Mazur	(Denmark) Jacob Bidstrup	No entries	(Germany) Juliano Holzem (Germany) Sandro Holzem
3	R3	(Spain) Circuit Ricardo Tormo	(Germany) No. 8 Liqui Moly Team Engstler	(Spain) No. 15 NM Racing	(Austria) No. 11 Konrad Motorsport	**(Germany) No. 8 Liqui Moly Team Engstler**	(Italy) No. 151 AF Corse	(Poland) No. 27 PTT Racing	(United Kingdom) No. 22 Greystone GT	(Denmark) No. 218 DC Motorsport	(Italy) No. 5 AF Corse	No entries	(Germany) No. 56 Schubert Motorsport
3	R3	(Spain) Circuit Ricardo Tormo	(Germany) Luca Engstler (Lithuania) Jonas Karklys	(Spain) Alberto de Martin (Spain) Manel Lao	(Germany) Carrie Schreiner (United States) Danny Soufi	**(Germany) Luca Engstler** **(Lithuania) Jonas Karklys**	(United Kingdom) John Dhillon (Republic of Ireland) Matt Griffin	(Poland) Przemysław Bieńkowski (Poland) Mateusz Lisowski	(United Kingdom) Ryan James (United Kingdom) Oliver Webb	(Denmark) Steen Almsgaard	(Republic of Ireland) Sean Doyle (United Kingdom) Darren Howell	No entries	(Germany) Juliano Holzem (Germany) Sandro Holzem
4	R1	(Spain) MotorLand Aragón	(Germany) No. 1 SR Motorsport by Schnitzelalm	No entries	**(Germany) No. 1 SR Motorsport by Schnitzelalm**	(Germany) No. 8 Liqui Moly Team Engstler	(Italy) No. 50 AF Corse	(Sweden) No. 44 Wileco Motorsport	(United Kingdom) No. 22 Greystone GT	(Poland) No. 25 UNIQ Racing	No entries	No entries	No entries
4	R1	(Spain) MotorLand Aragón	(Germany) Kenneth Heyer (Germany) Moritz Wiskirchen	No entries	**(Germany) Kenneth Heyer** **(Germany) Moritz Wiskirchen**	(Germany) Luca Engstler (Lithuania) Jonas Karklys	(Portugal) Rui Águas (Portugal) Cristiano Maciel	(Sweden) Calle Bergman (Sweden) Månz Thalin	(United Kingdom) Ryan James (United Kingdom) Oliver Webb	(Poland) Jerzy Spinkiewicz	No entries	No entries	No entries
4	R2	(Spain) MotorLand Aragón	(Austria) No. 14 Razoon - more than racing	No entries	**(Austria) No. 14 Razoon - more than racing**	No starters	(Italy) No. 50 AF Corse	(Germany) No 88 a-workx motorsport	No finishers	(Poland) No. 25 UNIQ Racing	No entries	No entries	No entries
4	R2	(Spain) MotorLand Aragón	(Denmark) Thomas Andersen (Denmark) Simon Birch	No entries	**(Denmark) Thomas Andersen** **(Denmark) Simon Birch**	No starters	(Portugal) Rui Águas (Portugal) Cristiano Maciel	(United Arab Emirates) Ahmed Arif Alkhoori	No finishers	(Poland) Jerzy Spinkiewicz	No entries	No entries	No entries
4	R3	(Spain) MotorLand Aragón	(Austria) No. 14 Razoon - more than racing	No entries	**(United Kingdom) No. 67 Orange Racing by JMH Automotive**	(Germany) No. 8 Liqui Moly Team Engstler	(Italy) No. 76 AF Corse	(Sweden) No. 44 Wileco Motorsport	No starters	(Italy) No. 333 Auto Sport Racing	No entries	No entries	No entries
4	R3	(Spain) MotorLand Aragón	(Denmark) Thomas Andersen (Denmark) Simon Birch	No entries	**(United Kingdom) Marcus Clutton** **(United Kingdom) Simon Orange**	(Germany) Luca Engstler (Lithuania) Jonas Karklys	(Denmark) Andreas Bøgh-Sorensen (Denmark) Mikkel Mac	(Sweden) Calle Bergman (Sweden) Månz Thalin	No starters	(Serbia) Miloš Pavlović (Italy) Alessio Ruffini	No entries	No entries	No entries
5	R1	(Spain) Circuit de Barcelona-Catalunya	(Germany) No. 1 SR Motorsport by Schnitzelalm	(Spain) No. 15 NM Racing	**(Belgium) No. 700 Comtoyou Racing**	(Germany) No. 8 Liqui Moly Team Engstler	(Italy) No. 198 AF Corse	(Poland) No. 33 PTT Racing	(United Kingdom) No. 170 Greystone GT	(Poland) No. 25 UNIQ Racing	(Italy) No. 5 AF Corse	No entries	(Germany) No. 56 Schubert Motorsport
5	R1	(Spain) Circuit de Barcelona-Catalunya	(Germany) Kenneth Heyer (Germany) Moritz Wiskirchen	(Spain) Alberto de Martin (Spain) Manel Lao	**(Belgium) Matisse Lismont** **(Belgium) Kobe Pauwels**	(Germany) Luca Engstler (Netherlands) Dante Rappange	(Canada) Eric Cheung (Italy) Daniele Di Amato	(Poland) Fabian Dybionka	(United Kingdom) Jayden Kelly (Australia) Mark Kempster	(Poland) Jerzy Spinkiewicz	(Republic of Ireland) Sean Doyle (United Kingdom) Darren Howell	No entries	(Germany) Juliano Holzem (Germany) Sandro Holzem
5	R2	(Spain) Circuit de Barcelona-Catalunya	(Austria) No. 14 Razoon - more than racing	No finishers	**(Austria) No. 14 Razoon - more than racing**	(Germany) No. 8 Liqui Moly Team Engstler	(Portugal) No. 150 Araújo Competição	(Sweden) No. 44 Wileco Motorsport	No finishers	(Kazakhstan) No. 12 ART-Line	No finishers	No entries	(Germany) No. 56 Schubert Motorsport
5	R2	(Spain) Circuit de Barcelona-Catalunya	(Denmark) Simon Birch (Austria) Leo Pichler	No finishers	**(Denmark) Simon Birch** **(Austria) Leo Pichler**	(Germany) Luca Engstler (Netherlands) Dante Rappange	(Portugal) Gonçalo Araújo (Portugal) Álvaro Ramos	(Sweden) Calle Bergman (Sweden) Månz Thalin	No finishers	(Kazakhstan) Shota Abkhazava	No finishers	No entries	(Germany) Juliano Holzem (Germany) Sandro Holzem
5	R3	(Spain) Circuit de Barcelona-Catalunya	(Germany) No. 1 SR Motorsport by Schnitzelalm	No starters	**(Austria) No. 14 Razoon - more than racing**	(Germany) No. 8 Liqui Moly Team Engstler	(Italy) No. 76 AF Corse	(Poland) No. 7 PTT Racing	(United Kingdom) No. 170 Greystone GT	(Poland) No. 25 UNIQ Racing	(Italy) No. 5 AF Corse	No entries	(Germany) No. 56 Schubert Motorsport
5	R3	(Spain) Circuit de Barcelona-Catalunya	(Germany) Kenneth Heyer (Germany) Moritz Wiskirchen	No starters	**(Denmark) Simon Birch** **(Austria) Leo Pichler**	(Germany) Luca Engstler (Netherlands) Dante Rappange	(Denmark) Andreas Bøgh-Sorensen (Denmark) Mikkel Mac	(Poland) Hubert Darmetko (Poland) Fabian Dybionka	(United Kingdom) Jayden Kelly (Australia) Mark Kempster	(Poland) Jerzy Spinkiewicz	(Republic of Ireland) Sean Doyle (United Kingdom) Darren Howell	No entries	(Germany) Juliano Holzem (Germany) Sandro Holzem

== Championship standings ==
In a two-driver entry, only one driver will compete in each of the two sprint races – regardless of which driver competes, both receive the associated points. Cup X entries are ineligible for points.

=== Scoring system ===
Overall classification will be based on the points scored in class.

Position in class	Number of starters per class						
Position in class	1	2	3	4	5	6	7+
1st	10	12	14	16	18	20	20
2nd		10	12	14	16	18	18
3rd			10	12	14	16	16
4th				10	12	14	14
5th					10	12	12
6th						10	10
7th+							8

=== Overall ===
Pos.	Driver	Team	Class	EST (Portugal)			ALG (Portugal)			CRT (Spain)			ARA (Spain)			BAR (Spain)			Points
Pos.	Driver	Team	Class	RC1	RC2	RC3	RC1	RC2	RC3	RC1	RC2	RC3	RC1	RC2	RC3	RC1	RC2	RC3	Points
1	(Portugal) Rui Águas (Portugal) Cristiano Maciel	(Italy) AF Corse	Cup 1	6^{2}	1^{1}	2^{2}	7^{1}	7^{2}	4^{4}	11^{5}	8^{4}	6^{2}	5^{1}	4^{1}	Ret	12^{2}	13^{4}	12^{2}	204
2	(Sweden) Calle Bergman (Sweden) Månz Thalin	(Sweden) Wileco Motorsport	Cup 2	7^{2}	7^{1}	8^{1}	10^{1}	13^{3}	14^{2}	18^{3}	Ret	22^{4}	10^{1}	10^{2}	10^{1}	19^{2}	11^{1}	13^{2}	190
3	(Germany) Kenneth Heyer (Germany) Moritz Wiskirchen	(Germany) SR Motorsport by Schnitzelalm	GT3	10^{3}	5^{1}	3^{1}	2^{2}	6^{3}	13^{2}	Ret	Ret	8^{3}	1^{1}	6^{4}	4^{2}	2^{2}	6^{4}	5^{4}	190
4	(Serbia) Miloš Pavlović (Italy) Alessio Ruffini	(Italy) Auto Sport Racing	Cup 4	DNS	9^{3}	5^{2}	19^{3}	10^{2}	10^{2}	13^{2}	12^{3}	29^{2}	12^{3}	11^{2}	3^{1}	20^{2}	19^{2}	16^{3}	184
5	(Poland) Jerzy Spinkiewicz	(Poland) UNIQ Racing	Cup 4	Ret	3^{1}	4^{1}	3^{1}	3^{1}	7^{1}				4^{1}	3^{1}	5^{2}	8^{1}	Ret	9^{1}	152
6	(Denmark) Andreas Bøgh-Sorensen	(Italy) AF Corse	Cup 1	3^{1}	4^{3}	1^{1}	11^{3}	19^{6}	3^{3}				9^{2}	Ret	2^{1}	13^{3}	10^{3}	7^{1}	150
7	(Denmark) Simon Birch	(Austria) Razoon - more than racing	GT3				6^{3}	2^{2}	5^{1}				Ret	1^{1}	6^{3}	5^{3}	1^{1}	1^{1}	138
8	(Germany) Carrie Schreiner (United States) Danny Soufi	(Austria) Konrad Motorsport	GT3							4^{2}	5^{1}	3^{1}	6^{3}	8^{6}	9^{4}	7^{5}	5^{3}	3^{3}	134
9	(United Kingdom) John Dhillon (Republic of Ireland) Matt Griffin	(Italy) AF Corse	Cup 1				13^{5}	17^{5}	1^{1}	8^{3}	11^{6}	5^{1}				14^{4}	9^{2}	21^{4}	132
10	(Mexico) Alfredo Hernández Ortega	(Belgium) BDR Competition by Grupoprom	GT3	5^{2}	DNS	10^{3}	22^{6}	11^{4}	18^{3}	17^{4}	17^{2}	16^{4}				15^{8}	12^{5}	14^{6}	122
11	(Poland) Przemysław Bieńkowski	(Poland) PTT Racing	Cup 2	12^{4}	11^{2}	DNS	15^{3}	12^{2}	11^{1}	19^{4}	26^{4}	11^{1}	14^{3}	Ret	DNS				112
12	(Denmark) Mikkel Mac	(Italy) AF Corse	Cup 1				11^{3}	19^{6}	3^{3}				9^{2}	Ret	2^{1}	13^{3}	10^{3}	7^{1}	112
13	(Poland) Hubert Darmetko	(Poland) PTT Racing	Cup 2							15^{1}	14^{1}	DNS	16^{4}	13^{3}	DNS	23^{4}	16^{4}	11^{1}	102
14	(Belgium) Matisse Lismont (Belgium) Kobe Pauwels	(Belgium) Comtoyou Racing	GT3							2^{1}	23^{3}	4^{2}				1^{1}	3^{2}	6^{5}	96
15	(Poland) Mateusz Lisowski	(Poland) PTT Racing	Cup 2				15^{3}	12^{2}	11^{1}	19^{4}	26^{4}	11^{1}	14^{3}	Ret	DNS				92
16	(Serbia) Alex Beatović	(Italy) Auto Sport Racing	Cup 4	13^{2}	Ret	11^{3}	DNS	15^{3}	19^{4}	14^{3}	32^{5}	Ret	17^{4}	12^{3}	Ret				92
17	(Portugal) Gonçalo Araújo (Portugal) Álvaro Ramos	(Portugal) Araújo Competição	Cup 1	9^{3}	2^{2}	Ret				20^{7}	3^{1}	28^{12}				Ret	7^{1}	17^{3}	90
18	(Republic of Ireland) Sean Doyle (United Kingdom) Darren Howell	(Italy) AF Corse	Cup 5				21^{1}	16^{1}	16^{1}	28^{2}	27^{2}	15^{1}				22^{1}	Ret	19^{1}	88
19	(United Kingdom) Marcus Clutton (United Kingdom) Simon Orange	(United Kingdom) Orange Racing by JMH Automotive	GT3										8^{4}	7^{5}	1^{1}	6^{4}	20^{6}	2^{2}	88
20	(Spain) Rafael Durán (Singapore) Sean Hudspeth	(Italy) AF Corse	Cup 1				12^{4}	5^{1}	2^{2}	30^{11}	7^{3}	26^{10}							84
21	(Poland) Karol Kręt	(Poland) Förch Racing by Atlas Ward	Cup 2							16^{2}	15^{2}	13^{2}				21^{3}	17^{5}	20^{4}	84
22	(Poland) Seweryn Mazur	GT3 Poland	Cup 4	1^{1}	8^{2}	Ret	5^{2}	Ret	12^{3}	31^{4}	6^{1}	DNS							82
23	(Denmark) Thomas Andersen	(Austria) Razoon - more than racing	GT3				6^{3}	2^{2}	5^{1}				Ret	1^{1}	6^{3}				82
24	(Germany) Luca Engstler	(Germany) Liqui Moly Team Engstler	GT3 Pro							3^{1}	1^{1}	1^{1}	2^{1}	DNS	7^{1}	3^{1}	2^{1}	4^{1}	80
25	(United Kingdom) Oscar Ryndziewicz	(Germany) Mertel Motorsport	Cup 5	11^{1}	10^{1}	7^{1}													76
25	(United Kingdom) Oscar Ryndziewicz	(Germany) Mertel Motorsport	Cup 1				8^{2}	Ret	6^{5}	DNS	18^{8}	27^{11}							76
26	(United Arab Emirates) Ahmed Arif Alkhoori	(Germany) a-workx motorsport	Cup 2										13^{2}	9^{1}	11^{2}	25^{5}	15^{3}	15^{3}	76
27	(United Kingdom) Ryan James (United Kingdom) Oliver Webb	(United Kingdom) Greystone GT	Cup 3				20^{1}	18^{1}	17^{1}	23^{1}	21^{1}	24^{1}	15^{1}	Ret	DNS				74
28	(Poland) Jakub Twaróg	(Poland) Förch Racing by Atlas Ward	Cup 2							22^{5}	19^{3}	19^{3}				21^{3}	17^{5}	20^{4}	74
29	(Canada) Eric Cheung (Italy) Daniele Di Amato	(Italy) AF Corse	Cup 1							5^{1}	31^{12}	9^{4}				10^{1}	18^{5}	Ret	72
30	(Portugal) Leandro Martins (Austria) Dieter Svepes	(Portugal) Racar Motorsport	Cup 2	4^{1}	DNS	9^{2}	14^{2}	9^{1}	15^{3}										62
31	(Kazakhstan) Shota Abkhazava	(Kazakhstan) ART-Line	Cup 4										7^{2}	Ret	8^{3}	24^{3}	8^{1}	10^{2}	62
32	(Austria) Leo Pichler	(Austria) Razoon - more than racing	GT3													5^{3}	1^{1}	1^{1}	56
33	(Lithuania) Jonas Karklys	(Germany) Liqui Moly Team Engstler	GT3 Pro							3^{1}	1^{1}	1^{1}	2^{1}	DNS	7^{1}				50
34	(Switzerland) Dexter Müller	(Germany) CBRX by SPS Automotive Performance	GT3	2^{1}	6^{2}	6^{2}	9^{4}	Ret	WD										50
35	(Poland) Mariusz Górecki	(Poland) Förch Racing by Atlas Ward	Cup 2							16^{2}	15^{2}	13^{2}							50
36	(Serbia) Petar Matić	(Italy) Auto Sport Racing	Cup 4							14^{3}	32^{5}	Ret	17^{4}	12^{3}	Ret				46
37	(Italy) Nicola Caldani (Spain) Alberto Duran	(Italy) AF Corse	Cup 1				18^{7}	14^{4}	9^{7}	21^{8}	Ret	18^{8}							46
38	(Denmark) Anders Bidstrup	(Denmark) DC Motorsport	Cup 1							29^{10}	4^{2}	7^{3}							42
39	(Lithuania) Jonas Gelžinis (Lithuania) Eimantas Navikauskas	(Lithuania) Juta Racing	GT3										11^{5}	2^{2}	12^{5}				42
40	(Spain) Alberto de Martin (Spain) Manel Lao	(Spain) NM Racing	GT2							25^{1}	13^{1}	14^{1}				17^{1}	Ret	DNS	40
41	(Denmark) Benny Simonsen	(Italy) AF Corse	Cup 1	3^{1}	4^{3}	1^{1}													38
42	(Denmark) Jacob Bidstrup	(Denmark) DC Motorsport	Cup 5							26^{1}	24^{1}	23^{3}							38
43	(United Arab Emirates) Keanu Al Azhari	(Germany) SSR Performance	GT3				1^{1}	1^{1}	WD										38
44	(Denmark) Steen Almsgaard	(Denmark) DC Motorsport	Cup 4							32^{5}	30^{4}	25^{1}							38
45	(Austria) Alois Meir (United Kingdom) James Owen	(Germany) Liqui Moly Team Engstler	Cup 1							6^{2}	22^{10}	12^{6}							36
46	(Germany) Antoine Berberich-Martini (Germany) Luca Ludwig	(Germany) Mertel Motorsport	Cup 1				16^{6}	8^{3}	8^{6}										36
47	(Denmark) Ulrik Larsen	(Denmark) DC Motorsport	Cup 4							9^{1}	10^{2}	Ret							34
48	(Poland) Fabian Dybionka (Note: Dybionka competed in two cars during the weekend in Barcelona, but scored points only in the No. 33 entry)	(Poland) PTT Racing	Cup 2													18^{1}	14^{2}	DNS	34
49	(United Kingdom) Charles Dawson (United States) Aaron Farhadi	(San Marino) AKM Motorsport	GT3										3^{2}	5^{3}	Ret				34
50	(Italy) Stefano Gai (Note: Gai competed in two cars during the weekend in Valencia, but scored points only in the No. 101 entry) (Italy) Paolo Scudieri	(Italy) AF Corse	Cup 1							12^{6}	9^{5}	10^{5}							34
51	(Netherlands) Dante Rappange	(Germany) Liqui Moly Team Engstler	GT3 Pro													3^{1}	2^{1}	4^{1}	30
52	(Japan) Shintaro Akatsu	(Italy) Reparto Corse RAM	Cup 1							10^{4}	16^{7}	20^{9}							30
53	(United Kingdom) Germana Tognella (Greece) Zois Skrimpias	(Italy) Reparto Corse RAM	Cup 1							24^{9}	25^{11}	17^{7}							24
54	(Italy) Giuseppe Casillo	(Italy) AF Corse	Cup 5							Ret	29^{3}	21^{2}							22
55	(Germany) Joachim Bölting	(Germany) Plusline Racing Team	Cup 2	8^{3}	WD	WD				33^{6}	Ret	DNS							22
56	(United Kingdom) Jayden Kelly (Australia) Mark Kempster	(United Kingdom) Greystone GT	Cup 3													11^{1}	Ret	18^{1}	20
57	(Germany) Andreas Greiling	(Austria) MS Racing	Cup 3							27^{2}	28^{2}	DNS							20
58	(Italy) Andrea Gagliardini (Germany) Sven Schömer	(Italy) AF Corse	Cup 1							DNS	20^{9}	30^{13}							16
59	(Brazil) Ricardo Baptista (Brazil) Rafael Suzuki	(Belgium) Comtoyou Racing	GT3							7^{3}	Ret	DNS							14
60	(Germany) Danilo del Favero	(Italy) AF Corse	Cup 1													16^{5}	Ret	DNS	12
61	(United States) Thor Haugen (Italy) Paolo Ruberti	(Italy) Pellin Racing	GT3				17^{5}	DNS	DNS										12
62	(Germany) Adrian Rziczny (Liechtenstein) Fabienne Wohlwend	(Germany) PROsport Racing	GT3													9^{6}	Ret	DNS	10
–	(Italy) Max Blancardi (Lebanon) Talal Shair	(Italy) AF Corse	Cup 1							DNS	DNS	DNS							–
Cup X and Invitational entries ineligible for scoring points.
–	(Switzerland) Simon Willner	(Austria) MZR	Cup X				4^{1}	4^{1}	DNS										–
–	(Germany) Juliano Holzem (Germany) Sandro Holzem	(Germany) Schubert Motorsport	INV							1^{1}	2^{1}	2^{1}				4^{1}	4^{1}	8^{1}	–
Pos.	Driver	Team		EST (Portugal)			ALG (Portugal)			CRT (Spain)			ARA (Spain)			BAR (Spain)			Points

Colour	Result
Gold	Winner
Silver	Second place
Bronze	Third place
Green	Points classification
Blue	Non-points classification
Blue	Non-classified finish (NC)
Purple	Retired, not classified (Ret)
Red	Did not qualify (DNQ)
Red	Did not pre-qualify (DNPQ)
Black	Disqualified (DSQ)
White	Did not start (DNS)
White	Withdrew (WD)
White	Race cancelled (C)
Blank	Did not practice (DNP)
Blank	Did not arrive (DNA)
Blank	Excluded (EX)

**Bold** – Pole

Italics – Fastest Lap

† — Did not finish, but classified

^{1 2 3...} – Position in class

=== GT2 ===
Pos.	Driver	Team	EST (Portugal)			ALG (Portugal)			CRT (Spain)			ARA (Spain)			BAR (Spain)			Points
Pos.	Driver	Team	RC1	RC2	RC3	RC1	RC2	RC3	RC1	RC2	RC3	RC1	RC2	RC3	RC1	RC2	RC3	Points
1	(Spain) Alberto de Martin (Spain) Manel Lao	(Spain) NM Racing							**1**	**1**	**1**				**1**	Ret	DNS	40
Pos.	Driver	Team	EST (Portugal)			ALG (Portugal)			CRT (Spain)			ARA (Spain)			BAR (Spain)			Points

=== GT3 ===
Pos.	Driver	Team	EST (Portugal)			ALG (Portugal)			CRT (Spain)			ARA (Spain)			BAR (Spain)			Points
Pos.	Driver	Team	RC1	RC2	RC3	RC1	RC2	RC3	RC1	RC2	RC3	RC1	RC2	RC3	RC1	RC2	RC3	Points
1	(Germany) Kenneth Heyer (Germany) Moritz Wiskirchen	(Germany) SR Motorsport by Schnitzelalm	3	**1**	**1**	**2**	3	2	Ret	**Ret**	**3**	**1**	4	2	**P**		**P**	144
2	(Mexico) Alfredo Hernández Ortega	(Belgium) BDR Competition by Grupoprom	2	DNS	3	6	4	3	4	2	4							92
3	(Germany) Carrie Schreiner (United States) Danny Soufi	(Austria) Konrad Motorsport							2	1	1	3	6	4				90
4	(Denmark) Simon Birch	(Austria) Razoon - more than racing				3	2	**1**				Ret	**1**	**3**		**P**		82
4	(Denmark) Thomas Andersen	(Austria) Razoon - more than racing				3	2	**1**				Ret	**1**	**3**				82
5	(Switzerland) Dexter Müller	(Germany) CBRX by SPS Automotive Performance	**1**	2	2	4	Ret	WD										50
6	(Belgium) Matisse Lismont (Belgium) Kobe Pauwels	(Belgium) Comtoyou Racing							**1**	3	2							46
7	(United Kingdom) Marcus Clutton (United Kingdom) Simon Orange	(United Kingdom) Orange Racing by JMH Automotive										4	5	1				46
8	(Lithuania) Jonas Gelžinis (Lithuania) Eimantas Navikauskas	(Lithuania) Juta Racing										5	2	5				42
9	(United Arab Emirates) Keanu Al Azhari	(Germany) SSR Performance				1	**1**	WD										38
10	(United Kingdom) Charles Dawson (United States) Aaron Farhadi	(San Marino) AKM Motorsport										2	3	Ret				34
11	(Brazil) Ricardo Baptista (Brazil) Rafael Suzuki	(Belgium) Comtoyou Racing							3	Ret	DNS							14
12	(United States) Thor Haugen (Italy) Paolo Ruberti	(Italy) Pellin Racing				5	DNS	DNS										12
	(Germany) Adrian Rziczny (Liechtenstein) Fabienne Wohlwend	(Germany) PROsport Racing																
	(Austria) Leo Pichler	(Austria) Razoon - more than racing														**P**		
Pos.	Driver	Team	EST (Portugal)			ALG (Portugal)			CRT (Spain)			ARA (Spain)			BAR (Spain)			Points

=== GT3 Pro ===
Pos.	Driver	Team	EST (Portugal)			ALG (Portugal)			CRT (Spain)			ARA (Spain)			BAR (Spain)			Points
Pos.	Driver	Team	RC1	RC2	RC3	RC1	RC2	RC3	RC1	RC2	RC3	RC1	RC2	RC3	RC1	RC2	RC3	Points
1	(Germany) Luca Engstler	(Germany) Liqui Moly Team Engstler							**1**	**1**	**1**	**1**	**DNS**	**1**	**P**	**P**	**P**	50
1	(Lithuania) Jonas Karklys	(Germany) Liqui Moly Team Engstler							**1**	**1**	**1**	**1**	**DNS**	**1**				50
	(Netherlands) Dante Rappange	(Germany) Liqui Moly Team Engstler													**P**	**P**	**P**	
Pos.	Driver	Team	EST (Portugal)			ALG (Portugal)			CRT (Spain)			ARA (Spain)			BAR (Spain)			Points

=== Cup 1 ===
Pos.	Driver	Team	EST (Portugal)			ALG (Portugal)			CRT (Spain)			ARA (Spain)			BAR (Spain)			Points
Pos.	Driver	Team	RC1	RC2	RC3	RC1	RC2	RC3	RC1	RC2	RC3	RC1	RC2	RC3	RC1	RC2	RC3	Points
1	(Portugal) Rui Águas (Portugal) Cristiano Maciel	(Italy) AF Corse	2	1	2	1	2	4	5	4	2	**1**	**1**	**Ret**				158
2	(Denmark) Andreas Bøgh-Sorensen	(Italy) AF Corse	**1**	3	**1**	3	6	3				2	Ret	1				102
3	(United Kingdom) John Dhillon (Republic of Ireland) Matt Griffin	(Italy) AF Corse				5	5	1	3	6	1							90
4	(Spain) Rafael Durán (Singapore) Sean Hudspeth	(Italy) AF Corse				4	1	2	11	3	10							84
5	(Denmark) Mikkel Mac	(Italy) AF Corse				3	6	3				2	Ret	1				64
6	(Portugal) Gonçalo Araújo (Portugal) Álvaro Ramos	(Portugal) Araújo Competição	3	**2**	Ret				7	1	12					**P**		58
7	(Italy) Nicola Caldani (Spain) Alberto Duran	(Italy) AF Corse				7	4	7	8	Ret	8							46
8	(United Kingdom) Oscar Ryndziewicz	(Germany) Mertel Motorsport				**2**	**Ret**	**5**	DNS	8	11							46
9	(Canada) Eric Cheung (Italy) Daniele Di Amato	(Italy) AF Corse							**1**	**12**	**4**				**P**			42
10	(Denmark) Anders Bidstrup	(Denmark) DC Motorsport							10	2	3							42
11	(Denmark) Benny Simonsen	(Italy) AF Corse	**1**	3	**1**													38
12	(Austria) Alois Meir (United Kingdom) James Owen	(Germany) Liqui Moly Team Engstler							2	10	6							36
13	(Germany) Antoine Berberich-Martini (Germany) Luca Ludwig	(Germany) Mertel Motorsport				6	3	6										36
14	(Italy) Stefano Gai (Italy) Paolo Scudieri	(Italy) AF Corse							6	5	5							34
15	(Japan) Shintaro Akatsu	(Italy) Reparto Corse RAM							4	7	9							30
16	(United Kingdom) Germana Tognella (Greece) Zois Skrimpias	(Italy) Reparto Corse RAM							9	11	7							24
17	(Italy) Andrea Gagliardini (Germany) Sven Schömer	(Italy) AF Corse							DNS	9	13							16
–	(Italy) Max Blancardi (Lebanon) Talal Shair	(Italy) AF Corse							DNS	DNS	DNS							–
	(Germany) Danilo del Favero	(Italy) AF Corse															**P**	
Pos.	Driver	Team	EST (Portugal)			ALG (Portugal)			CRT (Spain)			ARA (Spain)			BAR (Spain)			Points

=== Cup 2 ===
Pos.	Driver	Team	EST (Portugal)			ALG (Portugal)			CRT (Spain)			ARA (Spain)			BAR (Spain)			Points
Pos.	Driver	Team	RC1	RC2	RC3	RC1	RC2	RC3	RC1	RC2	RC3	RC1	RC2	RC3	RC1	RC2	RC3	Points
1	(Sweden) Calle Bergman (Sweden) Månz Thalin	(Sweden) Wileco Motorsport	2	**1**	1	**1**	3	**2**	**3**	**Ret**	**4**	**1**	**2**	**1**				142
2	(Poland) Przemysław Bieńkowski	(Poland) PTT Racing	4	2	DNS	3	2	1	4	4	1	3	Ret	DNS				112
3	(Poland) Mateusz Lisowski	(Poland) PTT Racing				3	2	1	4	4	1	3	Ret	DNS				92
4	(Portugal) Leandro Martins (Austria) Dieter Svepes	(Portugal) Racar Motorsport	**1**	DNS	**2**	2	**1**	3										62
5	(Poland) Hubert Darmetko	(Poland) PTT Racing							1	1	DNS	4	3	DNS	**P**			62
6	(Poland) Mariusz Górecki	(Poland) Förch Racing by Atlas Ward							2	2	2							50
6	(Poland) Karol Kręt	(Poland) Förch Racing by Atlas Ward							2	2	2							50
7	(United Arab Emirates) Ahmed Arif Alkhoori	(Germany) a-workx motorsport										2	1	2		**P**	**P**	40
8	(Poland) Jakub Twaróg	(Poland) Förch Racing by Atlas Ward							5	3	3							40
9	(Germany) Joachim Bölting	(Germany) Plusline Racing Team	3	WD	WD				6	Ret	DNS							22
	(Poland) Fabian Dybionka	(Poland) Förch Racing by Atlas Ward																
Pos.	Driver	Team	EST (Portugal)			ALG (Portugal)			CRT (Spain)			ARA (Spain)			BAR (Spain)			Points

=== Cup 3 ===
Pos.	Driver	Team	EST (Portugal)			ALG (Portugal)			CRT (Spain)			ARA (Spain)			BAR (Spain)			Points
Pos.	Driver	Team	RC1	RC2	RC3	RC1	RC2	RC3	RC1	RC2	RC3	RC1	RC2	RC3	RC1	RC2	RC3	Points
1	(United Kingdom) Ryan James (United Kingdom) Oliver Webb	(United Kingdom) Greystone GT				**1**	**1**	**1**	**1**	**1**	**1**	**1**	**Ret**	**DNS**				74
2	(Germany) Andreas Greiling	(Austria) MS Racing							2	2	DNS							20
	(United Kingdom) Jayden Kelly (Australia) Mark Kempster	(United Kingdom) Greystone GT													**P**	**P**	**P**	
Pos.	Driver	Team	EST (Portugal)			ALG (Portugal)			CRT (Spain)			ARA (Spain)			BAR (Spain)			Points

=== Cup 4 ===
Pos.	Driver	Team	EST (Portugal)			ALG (Portugal)			CRT (Spain)			ARA (Spain)			BAR (Spain)			Points
Pos.	Driver	Team	RC1	RC2	RC3	RC1	RC2	RC3	RC1	RC2	RC3	RC1	RC2	RC3	RC1	RC2	RC3	Points
1	(Serbia) Miloš Pavlović (Italy) Alessio Ruffini	(Italy) Auto Sport Racing	DNS	3	2	3	2	2	2	3	2	3	2	1				150
2	(Poland) Jerzy Spinkiewicz	(Poland) UNIQ Racing	**Ret**	1	**1**	**1**	**1**	**1**				**1**	**1**	**2**	**P**	**P**	**P**	124
3	(Serbia) Alex Beatović	(Italy) Auto Sport Racing	2	Ret	3	Ret	3	4	3	5	Ret	4	3	Ret				92
4	(Poland) Seweryn Mazur	GT3 Poland	1	**2**	Ret	2	Ret	3	**4**	**1**	**DNS**							82
5	(Serbia) Petar Matić	(Italy) Auto Sport Racing							3	5	Ret	4	3	Ret				46
6	(Denmark) Steen Almsgaard	(Denmark) DC Motorsport							5	4	1							38
7	(Denmark) Ulrik Larsen	(Denmark) DC Motorsport							1	2	Ret							34
8	(Kazakhstan) Shota Abkhazava	(Kazakhstan) ART-Line										2	Ret	3				26
Pos.	Driver	Team	EST (Portugal)			ALG (Portugal)			CRT (Spain)			ARA (Spain)			BAR (Spain)			Points

=== Cup 5 ===
Pos.	Driver	Team	EST (Portugal)			ALG (Portugal)			CRT (Spain)			ARA (Spain)			BAR (Spain)			Points
Pos.	Driver	Team	RC1	RC2	RC3	RC1	RC2	RC3	RC1	RC2	RC3	RC1	RC2	RC3	RC1	RC2	RC3	Points
1	(Republic of Ireland) Sean Doyle (United Kingdom) Darren Howell	(Italy) AF Corse				**1**	**1**	**1**	**2**	**2**	1				**P**	**P**	**P**	68
2	(Denmark) Jacob Bidstrup	(Denmark) DC Motorsport							1	1	**3**							38
3	(United Kingdom) Oscar Ryndziewicz	(Germany) Mertel Motorsport	**1**	**1**	**1**													30
4	(Italy) Giuseppe Casillo	(Italy) AF Corse							Ret	3	2							22
Pos.	Driver	Team	EST (Portugal)			ALG (Portugal)			CRT (Spain)			ARA (Spain)			BAR (Spain)			Points
