= Sandro Holzem =

German racing driver (born 2004)

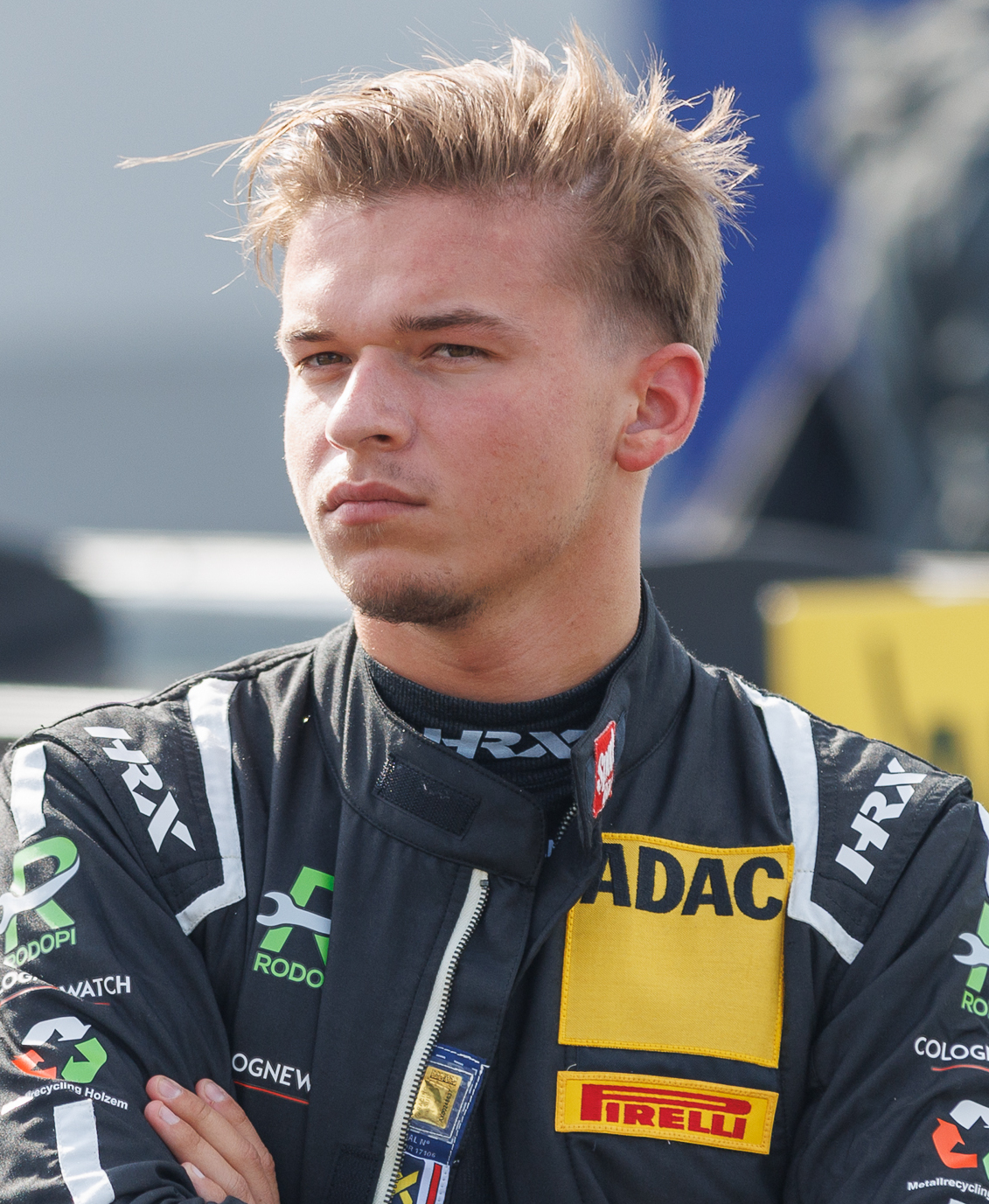
- Holzem in 2024
- Nationality: (Germany) German
- Born: 9 June 2004 (age 22) Polch, Germany

DTM career
- Debut season: 2023
- Current team: Project 1
- Categorisation: FIA Silver
- Car number: 56
- Starts: 10 (10 entries)
- Wins: 0
- Podiums: 0
- Poles: 0
- Fastest laps: 0
- Best finish: 30th in 2023

Previous series
- 2022: ADAC GT4 Germany

Sandro Holzem (born 9 June 2004) is a German racing driver currently competing for Schubert Motorsport in ADAC GT Masters. He previously raced for Project 1 in the DTM.

== Career ==
=== Karting ===
Holzem began racing on the European karting scene in 2019, partaking in an event of the European Championship before participating in that year's Karting World Championship in Alahärmä. He proceeded to take part in various continental competitions throughout the subsequent years.

=== ADAC GT4 Germany ===
In 2022, Holzem made his car racing debut, teaming up with twin brother Juliano at Dörr Motorsport in the ADAC GT4 Germany. The season yielded little success, as a twelfth place during the final race at the Hockenheimring meant a 40th place in the standings for the Holzem brothers.

=== DTM ===
For the 2023 season, it was announced that Holzem would progress to the DTM with Project 1, entering the championship following an extensive testing programme and guest starts at the GTC Race and the ADAC GT Masters, the latter of which Holzem together with Marco Wittmann would score a podium in. Following his DTM debut at the Nürburgring, ADAC officials granted Holzem full entry to the series, subsequently enabling him to score championship points.

== Racing record ==
=== Racing career summary ===
Season	Series	Team	Races	Wins	Poles	F/Laps	Podiums	Points	Position
2022	ADAC GT4 Germany	Dörr Motorsport	12	0	0	0	0	6	40th
2023	Deutsche Tourenwagen Masters	Project 1	10	0	0	0	0	0	30th
2023	ADAC GT Masters	Project 1	2	0	0	1	1	33	19th
2024	Prototype Winter Series - Class 3	Rinaldi Racing	3	2	2	1	3	20.365	5th
2024	ADAC GT Masters	Land-Motorsport	10	0	0	2	0	89	11th
2025	GT Winter Series - GT3	Schubert Motorsport	6	1	0	0	3	0	NC†
2025	ADAC GT Masters	Schubert Motorsport	12	0	0	0	3	143	5th
2025	Nürburgring Langstrecken-Serie - BMW M2 CS	Schubert Motorsport							
2026	ADAC GT Masters	Schubert Motorsport	12	1	1	1	2	132	4th
2026	Nürburgring Langstrecken-Serie - SP8T	Schubert Motorsport							

* Season still in progress.

=== Complete ADAC GT4 Germany results ===
(key) (Races in bold indicate pole position) (Races in italics indicate fastest lap)

Year	Team	Car	1	2	3	4	5	6	7	8	9	10	11	12	DC	Points
2022	Dörr Motorsport	Aston Martin Vantage AMR GT4	OSC; 1; 21	OSC; 2 Ret	RBR; 1 Ret	RBR; 2 Ret	ZAN; 1; 15	ZAN; 2; 22†	NÜR; 1; 23	NÜR; 2; 21	SAC; 1; 15	SAC; 2; 18	HOC; 1 Ret	HOC; 2; 12	40th	6

=== Complete Deutsche Tourenwagen Masters results ===
(key) (Races in bold indicate pole position) (Races in italics indicate fastest lap)

Year	Entrant	Chassis	1	2	3	4	5	6	7	8	9	10	11	12	13	14	15	16	Rank	Points
2023	Project 1	BMW M4 GT3	OSC; 1	OSC; 2	ZAN; 1	ZAN; 2	NOR; 1	NOR; 2	NÜR; 1; 21†	NÜR; 2; 14†	LAU; 1; 17	LAU; 2; 18	SAC; 1; 20	SAC; 2; 16	RBR; 1; 24	RBR; 2 Ret	HOC; 1; 21	HOC; 2; 21	30th	0

^{†} As Holzem was a guest driver, he was ineligible to score points.

=== Complete ADAC GT Masters results ===
(key) (Races in bold indicate pole position) (Races in italics indicate fastest lap)

Year	Team	Car	1	2	3	4	5	6	7	8	9	10	11	12	Rank	Points
2023	Project 1	BMW M4 GT3	HOC; 1	HOC; 2	NOR; 1	NOR; 2	NÜR; 1; 4	NÜR; 2; 2	SAC; 1	SAC; 2	RBR; 1	RBR; 2	HOC; 1	HOC; 2	19th	33
2024	Land-Motorsport	Audi R8 LMS GT3 Evo II	OSC; 1 WD	OSC; 2 WD	ZAN; 1; 11	ZAN; 2; 12	NÜR; 1; 7	NÜR; 2; 12	SPA; 1; 6	SPA; 2; 14	RBR; 1; 10	RBR; 2; 6	HOC; 1; 5	HOC; 2; 4^{3}	11th	89
2025	Schubert Motorsport	BMW M4 GT3 Evo	LAU; 1; 10	LAU; 2; 9	ZAN; 1; 3	ZAN; 2; 11	NÜR; 1; 6^{3}	NÜR; 2; 11^{3}	SAL; 1; 3	SAL; 2; 4	RBR; 1; 4^{2}	RBR; 2; 2	HOC; 1; 8^{2}	HOC; 2; 5	5th	143
2026	Schubert Motorsport	BMW M4 GT3 Evo	RBR; 1; 11	RBR; 2; 7	**ZAN**; **1**; 2^{1}	ZAN; 2; 9	LAU; 1; 1^{2}	LAU; 2; 9	NÜR; 1; 4	NÜR; 2; 12	SAL; 1; 5	SAL; 2; 10	HOC; 1; 8	HOC; 2; 9	4th	132
