= Thomas Preining =

Austrian racing driver

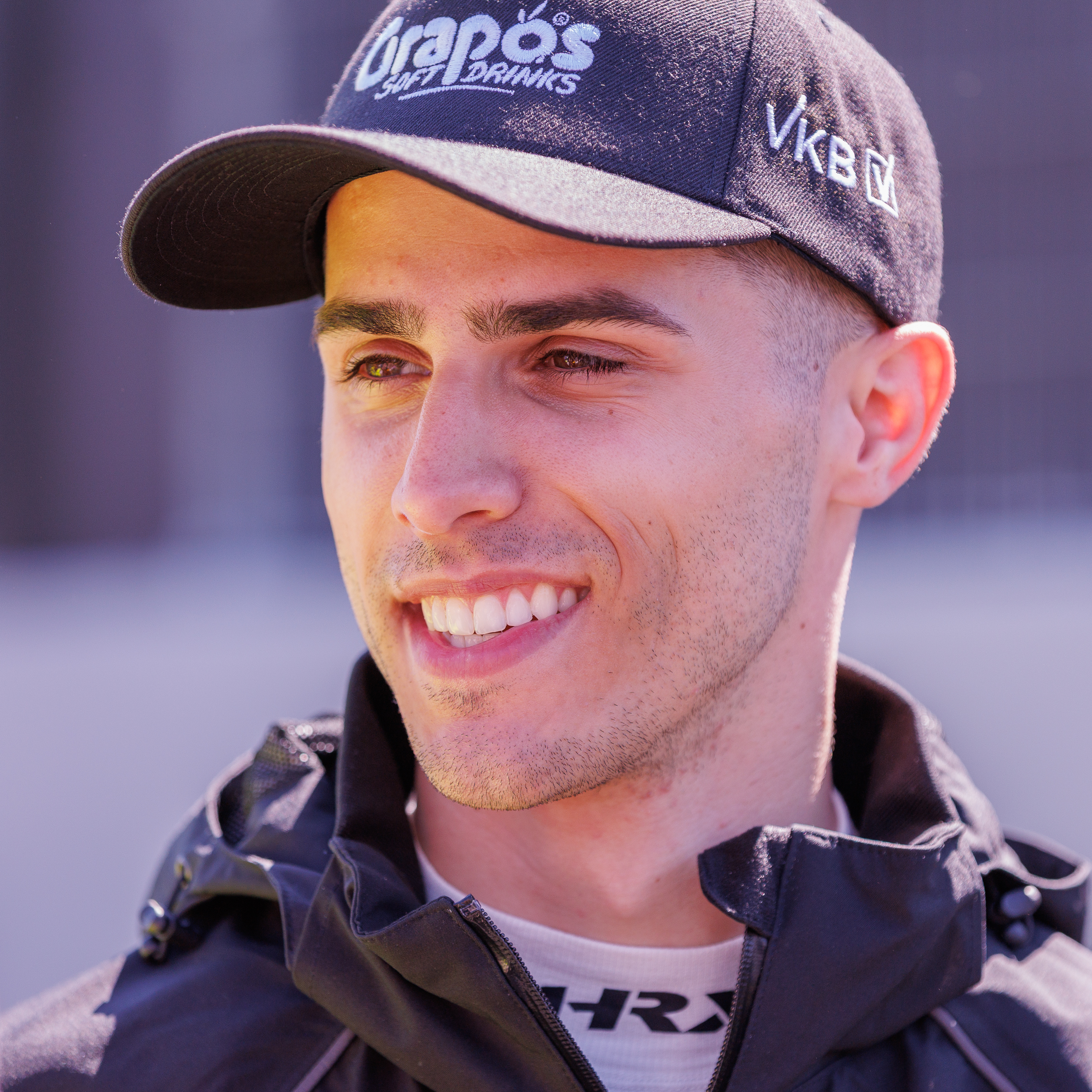
- Preining in 2025
- Nationality: (Austria) Austrian
- Born: 21 July 1998 (age 28) Linz, Austria

DTM career
- Debut season: 2022
- Current team: Manthey EMA
- Categorisation: FIA Silver (until 2018); FIA Gold (2019–2023); FIA Platinum (2024–)
- Car number: 91
- Former teams: KÜS Team Bernhard
- Starts: 79
- Wins: 10
- Poles: 6
- Fastest laps: 7
- Best finish: 1st in 2023 and 2026

Previous series
- 2019 2019 2017-18 2015-16 2015-16: ADAC GT Masters; European Le Mans Series; Porsche Carrera Cup Germany; Italian F4 Championship; ADAC Formula 4

Championship titles
- 2023, 2026 2018: Deutsche Tourenwagen Masters; Porsche Carrera Cup Germany

Thomas Preining (born 21 July 1998) is an Austrian racing driver. He is a Porsche factory driver, and competes in the Deutsche Tourenwagen Masters for Manthey Racing.

A Porsche protégé since 2017, Preining broke through in DTM, where he has raced since 2022. He was DTM champion in 2023 and 2026 for Manthey Racing, and won the 24 Hours of Spa and 12 Hours of Sebring in 2026. Preining has also been a test driver for Porsche's Formula E and LMDh efforts.

== Career ==
=== Karting ===
Preining began karting on a holiday in Mallorca at the age of seven. A mainstay of Rotax Max Challenge competitions from 2009 through 2015, he won five international karting titles, most notably the 2013 SKUSA SuperNationals and the 2014 RMC Euro Trophy at Rotax Junior level. Having alternated karting and Formula 4 in early 2015, the loss of a sponsor effectively put Preining's career on hold. Reflecting on it years later, he described it as "a defining time" where he "learned a lot about myself".

=== Formula 4 ===
Preining's first season in single seaters was in 2015 with German team ADAC Berlin-Brandenburg where he competed at the first two rounds in the ADAC Formula 4 Championship where he got a podium in only his third race at this level at Oschersleben. Preining finished the season with 16 points. Preining competed in another F4 championship in 2015 where he raced at the first round in the Italian F4 Championship at Vallelunga with German team Mücke Motorsport. His best finish was tenth.

In 2016, Preining returned to the ADAC F4 grid for the full season but this time racing for Austrian team Lechner Racing. Preining would go on to finished the season with two wins and a further four podiums, this helped him to fourth in the championship with 180.5 points. Championship winner, Joey Mawson, finished 193.5 points ahead of Preining. Like with the German championship, Preining returned to race in the Italian F4 Championship in 2016. He only competed one round and his best result was 12th.

=== Porsche Carrera Cup Germany ===
In 2017, Preining made the switch from single seater to Sports car where he competed in the 2017 Porsche Carrera Cup in Germany racing for Konrad Motorsport. Preining won two races meaning he finished five points behind Christian Engelhart in seventh. Preining made the switch to his former team Lechner Racing for 2018 where he dominated the season, winning ten of fourteen races and only failing to finish on the podium twice. He won the championship by 37 points over Michael Ammermüller.

=== Formula E ===
Due to Preining's affiliation with Porsche, their Formula E team offered him a drive in the 2020 Rookie test at Marrakech. He partnered experienced French driver Frédéric Makowiecki. Preining's fastest time 1:19.374, which was almost three seconds slower than Nick Cassidy's fastest time of a 1:16.467.

In May 2024, Preining would again drive for Porsche in the Rookie Test at Berlin. Just a year later on February, Preining returned to Formula E during the 2025 Jeddah ePrix rookie practice session with Porsche.

=== Deutsche Tourenwagen Masters ===
In December 2021, it was confirmed that Preining would race full-time in the 2022 Deutsche Tourenwagen Masters by driving the only Porsche 911 GT3 R car fielded by KÜS Team Bernhard. In the first race of the fourth round at the Norisring, Preining scored his first win in the DTM, which was also the first win for a Porsche car in the series. His second win in the DTM came in the second race of the seventh round at the Red Bull Ring, which saw him starting from seventh position and making several overtakes on a wet track, before being able to maintain the lead as the track began to dry. Ahead of the eighth and final round at the Hockenheimring, Preining was one of the five drivers who had a chance of winning the championship title. However, he was in one of the cars that were involved in a major crash during the Saturday race. Although he was able to extract himself from his badly damaged car, the doctors eventually declared him unfit to participate in the Sunday race. This left him in fifth place in the drivers' standings, with a total of 116 points.

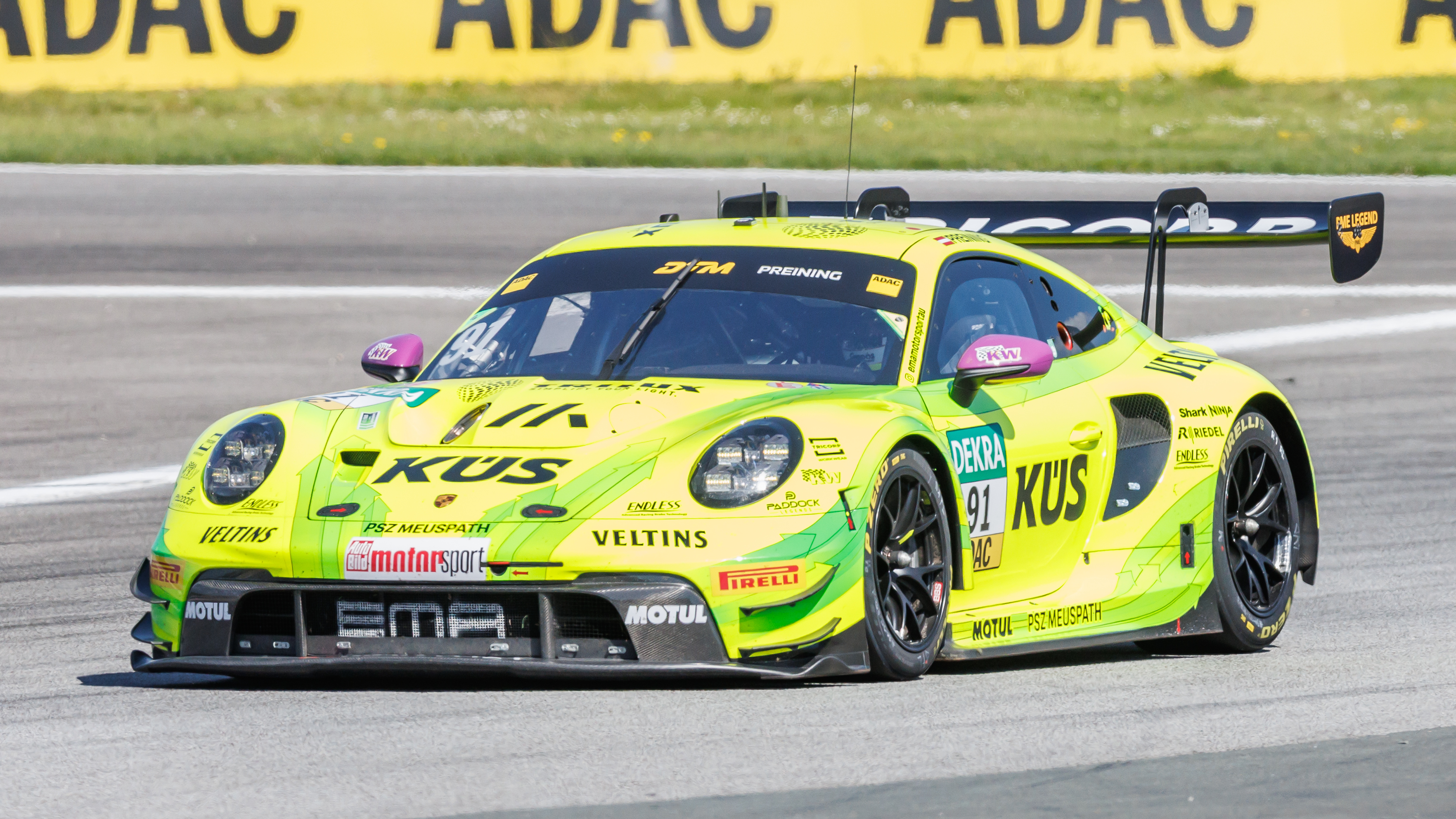
Preining at Motorsport Arena Oschersleben in 2025

In 2023, Preining returned to the series for a second consecutive season, moving to fellow Porsche outfit Manthey EMA. Thomas Preining was the DTM driver's champion 2023, driving for Manthey EMA, who were the teams' champions.

The 2023 Deutsche Tourenwagen Masters was the thirty-seventh season of the premier German motor racing championship and also the twenty-fourth season under the moniker of Deutsche Tourenwagen Masters since the series' resumption in 2000. It was the third season of the DTM to be run under Group GT3 regulations, and the first season with ADAC as the promoter after ITR ceased operations at the end of the previous year. Preining won 3 races, took 3 poles and 8 podiums on his way to his first DTM Championship in 2023.

In addition, Preining competed in the 2023 GT World Challenge Europe Endurance Cup with Rutronik Racing, sharing a Pro class entry with Laurin Heinrich and DTM teammate Dennis Olsen. In the following year 2024 Preining, together with Manthey Racing, could not defend their DTM title. Nevertheless Preining took one win and two more podium finishes in that DTM season 2024 finishing 5th overall. In the 2025 DTM season Preining took 5 podium finishes of which two race wins finishing 4th overall.

In 2026 Thomas Preining was once again the DTM driver's champion in a steady year with 2 wins and 6 more podium finishes totalling 225 points, while his team Manthey Racing was the DTM teams' champion with 330 points overall.

At the 2026 24 Hours of Spa, Thomas Preining won the race outright together with Bastian Buus and Ricardo Feller in a Lionspeed GP Porsche. They subsequently became the first Spa 24 Hours winners to start from the pit lane.

== Racing record ==
=== Career summary ===
Season	Series	Team	Races	Wins	Poles	F/Laps	Podiums	Points	Position
2015	ADAC Formula 4 Championship	ADAC Berlin-Brandenburg	6	0	0	0	1	16	21st
2015	Italian F4 Championship	Mücke Motorsport	3	0	0	0	0	0	29th
2016	ADAC Formula 4 Championship	Lechner Racing	24	2	2	0	6	180.5	4th
2016	Italian F4 Championship	Lechner Racing	3	0	0	0	0	0	37th
2017	Porsche GT3 Cup Brasil - Endurance		1	0	0	0	0	29	23rd
2017	Porsche Supercup	Walter Lechner Racing Team	4	0	0	0	0	22	19th
2017	Porsche Carrera Cup Germany	Konrad Motorsport	14	1	0	0	2	130	7th
2018	Porsche Supercup	Lechner Racing	10	4	3	3	5	135	**3rd**
2018	Porsche Carrera Cup Germany	Lechner Racing	14	10	11	11	12	279	**1st**
2018	24H GT Series - 911	Fach Auto Tech	1	0	0	1	1	?	?
2018–19	FIA World Endurance Championship - LMGTE Am	Gulf Racing UK	5	0	0	3	0	53	11th
2019	International GT Open	Frikadelli Racing	2	0	0	0	0	0	NC†
2019	European Le Mans Series - LMGTE	Proton Competition	3	1	1	2	1	32	10th
2019	ADAC GT Masters	Precote Herberth Motorsport	14	1	0	0	1	79	13th
2019	24 Hours of Nürburgring - SP9	Frikadelli Racing Team	1	0	0	0	0	N/A	DNF
2019–20	FIA World Endurance Championship - LMGTE Am	Dempsey-Proton Racing	5	0	0	0	0	12.5	15th
2019–20	Formula E	TAG Heuer Porsche Formula E Team	Test/Development driver						
2020	Intercontinental GT Challenge	Absolute Racing	1	0	0	0	0	8	17th
2020	GT World Challenge Europe Endurance Cup	GPX Racing	4	0	1	1	0	3	30th
2021	ADAC GT Masters	KÜS Team Bernhard	14	0	0	0	2	74	13th
2021	24 Hours of Nürburgring - SP9	Falken Motorsports	1	0	0	0	0	N/A	9th
2022	Deutsche Tourenwagen Masters	KÜS Team Bernhard	15	2	0	1	4	116	5th
2022	GT World Challenge Europe Endurance Cup	Dinamic Motorsport	1	0	0	0	0	6	28th
2022	Nürburgring Endurance Series - SP9	Dinamic Motorsport	2	0	0	0	0	0	NC†
2022	24 Hours of Nürburgring - SP9	Dinamic Motorsport	1	0	0	0	0	N/A	DNF
2023	Deutsche Tourenwagen Masters	Manthey EMA	16	3	3	2	8	246	**1st**
2023	Nürburgring Endurance Series - SP9	Manthey EMA	2	0	0	0	0	0	NC†
2023	24 Hours of Nürburgring - SP9	Manthey EMA	1	0	0	0	0	N/A	DNF
2023	Intercontinental GT Challenge	Manthey EMA	1	0	0	0	1	30	15th
2023	Intercontinental GT Challenge	Rutronik Racing	1	0	0	0	0	30	15th
2023	GT World Challenge Europe Endurance Cup	Rutronik Racing	5	0	0	1	1	38	7th
2023	FIA GT World Cup	HubAuto Racing	1	0	0	0	0	N/A	15th
2024	Deutsche Tourenwagen Masters	Manthey EMA	16	1	1	1	3	158	5th
2024	Nürburgring Langstrecken-Serie - SP9	Manthey EMA	2	0	0	1	2	0	NC†
2024	Intercontinental GT Challenge	Manthey EMA							
2024	24 Hours of Nürburgring - SP9	Manthey EMA	1	0	0	0	1	N/A	**2nd**
2024	IMSA SportsCar Championship - GTD	Andretti Motorsports	1	0	0	0	0	239	58th
2024	GT World Challenge Europe Endurance Cup	Phantom Global Racing	1	0	0	0	0	4	27th
2024	FIA GT World Cup	Origine Motorsport	1	0	0	0	0	N/A	15th
2025	Deutsche Tourenwagen Masters	Manthey EMA	16	2	0	4	5	182	4th
2025	Nürburgring Langstrecken-Serie - SP9	Manthey EMA							
2025	24 Hours of Nürburgring - SP9	Manthey EMA	1	0	1	0	1	N/A	**2nd**
2025	Middle East Trophy - GT3	Pure Rxcing							
2025	GT World Challenge Europe Endurance Cup	Pure Rxcing	5	0	0	0	0	0	NC
2025	IMSA SportsCar Championship - GTD Pro	Proton Competition	1	0	0	0	0	227	37th
2026	IMSA SportsCar Championship - GTD Pro	Manthey Racing	4	1	0	1	1	1169	13th
2026	Deutsche Tourenwagen Masters	Manthey Racing	16	2	2	1	8	225	**1st**
2026	GT World Challenge Europe Endurance Cup	Lionspeed GP	5	1	0	0	2	48	**3rd**
2026	Nürburgring Langstrecken-Serie - SP9	Manthey Racing EMA							
2026	24 Hours of Nürburgring - SP9	Manthey Racing EMA	1	0	0	0	0	N/A	DNF
2026	European Le Mans Series - LMGT3	High Class Racing	1	0	0	0	0	4	30th
2026	FIA GT World Cup	Tempo by Absolute Racing							

† As Preining was a guest driver, he was ineligible to score points.
^{*} Season still in progress.

=== Complete ADAC Formula 4 Championship results ===
(key) (Races in bold indicate pole position) (Races in italics indicate fastest lap)

Year	Team	1	2	3	4	5	6	7	8	9	10	11	12	13	14	15	16	17	18	19	20	21	22	23	24	Pos	Points
2015	ADAC Berlin-Brandenburg	OSC1; 1; 10	OSC1; 2; 29	OSC1; 3; 3	RBR; 1; 14	RBR; 2; 30	RBR; 3; 26	SPA; 1	SPA; 2	SPA; 3	LAU; 1	LAU; 2	LAU; 3	NÜR; 1	NÜR; 2	NÜR; 3	SAC; 1	SAC; 2	SAC; 3	OSC2; 1	OSC2; 2	OSC2; 3	HOC; 1	HOC; 2	HOC; 3	21st	16
2016	Lechner Racing	OSC1; 1; 6	OSC1; 2; 14	OSC1; 3; 3	SAC; 1; 28	SAC; 2; 18	SAC; 3; 13	LAU; 1; 3	LAU; 2; 7	LAU; 3; 8	**OSC2**; **1**; 2	OSC2; 2 DSQ	OSC2; 3; 5	**RBR**; **1**; 1	RBR; 2 Ret	RBR; 3; 16	NÜR; 1; 8	NÜR; 2; 7	NÜR; 3; 1	ZAN; 1; 14	ZAN; 2; 7	ZAN; 3; 10	HOC; 1; 5	HOC; 2; 2	HOC; 3; 5	4th	180.5

=== Complete Porsche Supercup results ===
(key) (Races in bold indicate pole position) (Races in italics indicate fastest lap)

Year	Team	1	2	3	4	5	6	7	8	9	10	11	Pos.	Points
2017	Walter Lechner Racing Team	CAT	CAT	MON	RBR	SIL	HUN; 18†	SPA	SPA	MNZ; 8†	MEX; 6	MEX; 5	19th	22
2018	BWT Lechner Racing	CAT; Ret	MON; 14	**RBR**; 1	SIL; 8	HOC; 4	**HUN**; 1	**SPA**; 1	MNZ; 1	MEX; 3	MEX; 4		3rd	135

^{†} As Preining was a guest driver, he was ineligible for points.

=== Complete FIA World Endurance Championship results ===
(key) (Races in bold indicate pole position; races in italics indicate fastest lap)

Year	Entrant	Class	Chassis	Engine	1	2	3	4	5	6	7	8	Rank	Points
2018–19	Gulf Racing UK	LMGTE Am	Porsche 911 RSR	Porsche 4.0 L Flat-6	SPA	LMS	SIL	FUJ; 4	SHA; 9	SEB; 4	SPA; 7	LMS; 4	11th	53
2019–20	Dempsey-Proton Racing	LMGTE Am	Porsche 911 RSR	Porsche 4.0 L Flat-6	SIL; 11	FUJ; 9	SHA; 6	BHR; Ret	COA; 9	SPA	LMS; NC	BHR	25th	12.5

=== Complete European Le Mans Series results ===
(key) (Races in bold indicate pole position; results in italics indicate fastest lap)

Year	Entrant	Class	Chassis	Engine	1	2	3	4	5	6	Rank	Points
2019	Proton Competition	LMGTE	Porsche 911 RSR	Porsche 4.0 L Flat-6	LEC; 7	MNZ; WD	CAT	**SIL**; 1	SPA; WD	ALG; Ret	10th	35
2026	High Class Racing	LMGT3	Porsche 911 GT3 R (992.2)	Porsche 4.2 L Flat-6	CAT	LEC; 8	IMO	SPA	SIL	ALG	30th	4

=== Complete ADAC GT Masters results ===
(key) (Races in bold indicate pole position) (Races in italics indicate fastest lap)

Year	Team	Car	1	2	3	4	5	6	7	8	9	10	11	12	13	14	DC	Points
2019	Precote Herberth Motorsport	Porsche 911 GT3 R	OSC; 1; 6	OSC; 2; 1	MST; 1; 21	MST; 2 Ret	RBR; 1; 7	RBR; 2 Ret	ZAN; 1 Ret	ZAN; 2; 17	NÜR; 1; 9	NÜR; 2; 11	HOC; 1; 24	HOC; 2; 6	SAC; 1; 13	SAC; 2; 8	13th	79
2021	KÜS Team Bernhard	Porsche 911 GT3 R	OSC; 1; 26	OSC; 2; 8	RBR; 1; 11	RBR; 2; 17	ZAN; 1 Ret	ZAN; 2 Ret	LAU; 1 Ret	LAU; 2; 15	SAC; 1; 5	SAC; 2; 3	HOC; 1; 12	HOC; 2; 4	NÜR; 1; 3	NÜR; 2 Ret	13th	74

=== Complete 24 Hours of Le Mans results ===
Year	Team	Co-Drivers	Car	Class	Laps	Pos.	Class Pos.
2019	(United Kingdom) Gulf Racing	(United Kingdom) Ben Barker (United Kingdom) Michael Wainwright	Porsche 911 RSR	GTE; Am	331	38th	8th
2020	(Germany) Dempsey-Proton Racing	(United States) Dominique Bastien (Belgium) Adrien de Leener	Porsche 911 RSR	GTE; Am	238	NC	NC

=== Complete 24 Hours of Nürburgring results ===
Year	Team	Co-Drivers	Car	Class	Laps	Pos.	Class Pos.
2019	(Germany) Frikadelli Racing Team	(Germany) Klaus Abbelen (Germany) Alexander Müller (Germany) Robert Renauer	Porsche 911 GT3 R (991.2)	SP9	135	DNF	DNF
2021	(Germany) Falken Motorsports	(Germany) Lance David Arnold (Austria) Klaus Bachler (Germany) Dirk Werner	Porsche 911 GT3 R (991.2)	SP9	59	9th	9th
2022	(Italy) Dinamic Motorsport	(Italy) Matteo Cairoli (Germany) Christian Engelhart (France) Côme Ledogar	Porsche 911 GT3 R (991.2)	SP9; Pro	11	DNF	DNF
2023	(Germany) Manthey EMA	(Denmark) Michael Christensen (France) Kévin Estre (France) Frédéric Makowiecki	Porsche 911 GT3 R (992)	SP9; Pro	62	DNF	DNF
2024	(Germany) Manthey EMA	(France) Kévin Estre (Turkey) Ayhancan Güven (Belgium) Laurens Vanthoor	Porsche 911 GT3 R (992)	SP9; Pro	50	**2nd**	**2nd**
2025	(Germany) Manthey EMA	(France) Kévin Estre (Turkey) Ayhancan Güven	Porsche 911 GT3 R (992)	SP9; Pro	141	**2nd**	**2nd**
2026	(Germany) Manthey Racing	(Australia) Matt Campbell (France) Kévin Estre (Turkey) Ayhancan Güven	Porsche 911 GT3 R (992.2)	SP9; Pro	24	DNF	DNF

=== Complete Bathurst 12 Hour results ===
Year	Team	Co-drivers	Car	Class	Laps	Pos.	Class Pos.
2020	(China) Absolute Racing	(Italy) Matteo Cairoli (Germany) Dirk Werner	Porsche 911 GT3 R (991.2)	AP	314	7th	7th
2023	(Germany) Manthey Racing / (Australia) EMA Motorsport	(Australia) Matt Campbell (France) Mathieu Jaminet	Porsche 911 GT3 R (991.2)	Pro	323	**2nd**	**2nd**

=== Complete GT World Challenge Europe results ===
==== GT World Challenge Europe Endurance Cup ====
(key) (Races in bold indicate pole position) (Races in italics indicate fastest lap)

Year	Team	Car	Class	1	2	3	4	5	6	7	Pos.	Points
2020	GPX Racing	Porsche 911 GT3 R	Pro	IMO; 9	**NÜR**; 19	SPA; 6H; 11	SPA; 12H; 15	SPA; 24H; 11	LEC; Ret		30th	3
2022	Dinamic Motorsport	Porsche 911 GT3 R	Pro	IMO	LEC	SPA; 6H; 6	SPA; 12H; Ret	SPA; 24H; Ret^{2}	HOC	CAT	28th	6
2023	Rutronik Racing	Porsche 911 GT3 R (992)	Pro	MNZ; 10	LEC; Ret	SPA; 6H; 12	SPA; 12H; 8	SPA; 24H; 5	NÜR; 5	CAT; 3	7th	38
2024	Phantom Global Racing	Porsche 911 GT3 R (992)	Pro	LEC	SPA; 6H; 6	SPA; 12H; 20	SPA; 24H; 26	NÜR	MNZ	JED	27th	4
2025	Pure Rxcing	Porsche 911 GT3 R (992)	Pro	LEC; 30	MNZ; 11	SPA; 6H; 63	SPA; 12H; 64†	SPA; 24H; Ret	NÜR; 11	CAT; 11	NC	0
2026	Lionspeed GP	Porsche 911 GT3 R (992.2)	Pro	LEC; Ret	MNZ; Ret	SPA; 6H; 15	SPA; 12H; 5	SPA; 24H; 1	NÜR; 15	ALG; 2	3rd	48

=== Complete Deutsche Tourenwagen Masters results ===
(key) (Races in bold indicate pole position) (Races in italics indicate fastest lap)

Year	Entrant	Chassis	1	2	3	4	5	6	7	8	9	10	11	12	13	14	15	16	Rank	Points
2022	KÜS Team Bernhard	Porsche 911 GT3 R	ALG; 1; 13	ALG; 2 Ret	LAU; 1 Ret	LAU; 2 Ret	IMO; 1; 4^{3}	IMO; 2 Ret	NOR; 1; 1^{2}	NOR; 2; 9	NÜR; 1 Ret	NÜR; 2; 7	SPA; 1; 3^{2}	SPA; 2; 3	RBR; 1; 5	RBR; 2; 1	HOC; 1 Ret	HOC; 2 DNS	5th	116
2023	Manthey EMA	Porsche 911 GT3 R (992)	OSC; 1; 11	**OSC**; **2**; 3^{1}	ZAN; 1; 7	ZAN; 2; 2^{2}	NOR; 1; 12^{2}	NOR; 2; 1^{2}	NÜR; 1; 3^{2}	NÜR; 2; 5	LAU; 1; 15	LAU; 2; 4	SAC; 1; 2	SAC; 2; 4	RBR; 1; 6	RBR; 2; 3	**HOC**; **1**; 1^{1}	**HOC**; **2**; 1^{1}	1st	246
2024	Manthey EMA	Porsche 911 GT3 R (992)	OSC; 1; 10	OSC; 2; 13	LAU; 1; 3^{2}	**LAU**; **2**; 1^{1}	ZAN; 1; 14	ZAN; 2; 10	NOR; 1; 14	NOR; 2; 6	NÜR; 1; 7	NÜR; 2; 7	SAC; 1; 6^{1}	SAC; 2; 4	RBR; 1; 12	RBR; 2; 2	HOC; 1; 14	HOC; 2; 4	5th	158
2025	Manthey EMA	Porsche 911 GT3 R (992)	OSC; 1; 4^{3}	OSC; 2; 3	LAU; 1; 6	LAU; 2 Ret^{3}	ZAN; 1 Ret	ZAN; 2; 3	NOR; 1; 2	NOR; 2; 1	NÜR; 1; 9	NÜR; 2; 10	SAC; 1; 4	SAC; 2; 10^{2}	RBR; 1; 6	RBR; 2; 21	HOC; 1; 1^{3}	HOC; 2; 6	4th	182
2026	Manthey Racing	Porsche 911 GT3 R (992.2)	RBR; 1; 1^{3}	RBR; 2; 13	ZAN; 1; 7	ZAN; 2; 8	LAU; 1; 12	LAU; 2; 10	NOR; 1; 9	NOR; 2; 9	**OSC**; **1**; 1^{1}	**OSC**; **2**; 2^{1}	NÜR; 1; 2^{2}	NÜR; 2; 3	SAC; 1; 3^{2}	SAC; 2; 2	HOC; 1; 5^{3}	HOC; 2; 3	1st	225

=== Complete IMSA SportsCar Championship results ===
(key) (Races in bold indicate pole position; races in italics indicate fastest lap)

Year	Entrant	Class	Make	Engine	1	2	3	4	5	6	7	8	9	10	Rank	Points
2024	Andretti Motorsports	GTD	Porsche 911 GT3 R (992)	Porsche 4.2 L Flat-6	DAY; 9	SEB	LBH	LGA	WGL	MOS	ELK	VIR	IMS	PET	58th	239
2025	Proton Competition	GTD Pro	Porsche 911 GT3 R (992)	Porsche 4.2 L Flat-6	DAY; 10	SEB	LGA	DET	WGL	MOS	ELK	VIR	IMS	PET	37th	227
2026	Manthey Racing	GTD Pro	Porsche 911 GT3 R (992.2)	Porsche 4.2 L Flat-6	DAY; 5	SEB; 1	LGA	DET	WGL	MOS	ELK; 9	VIR	IMS	PET; 7	13th	1169

Sporting positions
Preceded by Dennis Olsen	Porsche Carrera Cup Germany; Champion; 2018	Succeeded by Julien Andlauer
Preceded by Sheldon van der Linde	Deutsche Tourenwagen Masters; Champion; 2023	Succeeded by Mirko Bortolotti
Preceded by Ayhancan Güven	Deutsche Tourenwagen Masters; Champion; 2026	Succeeded by Incumbent
