= 2023 Deutsche Tourenwagen Masters =

Car racing championship

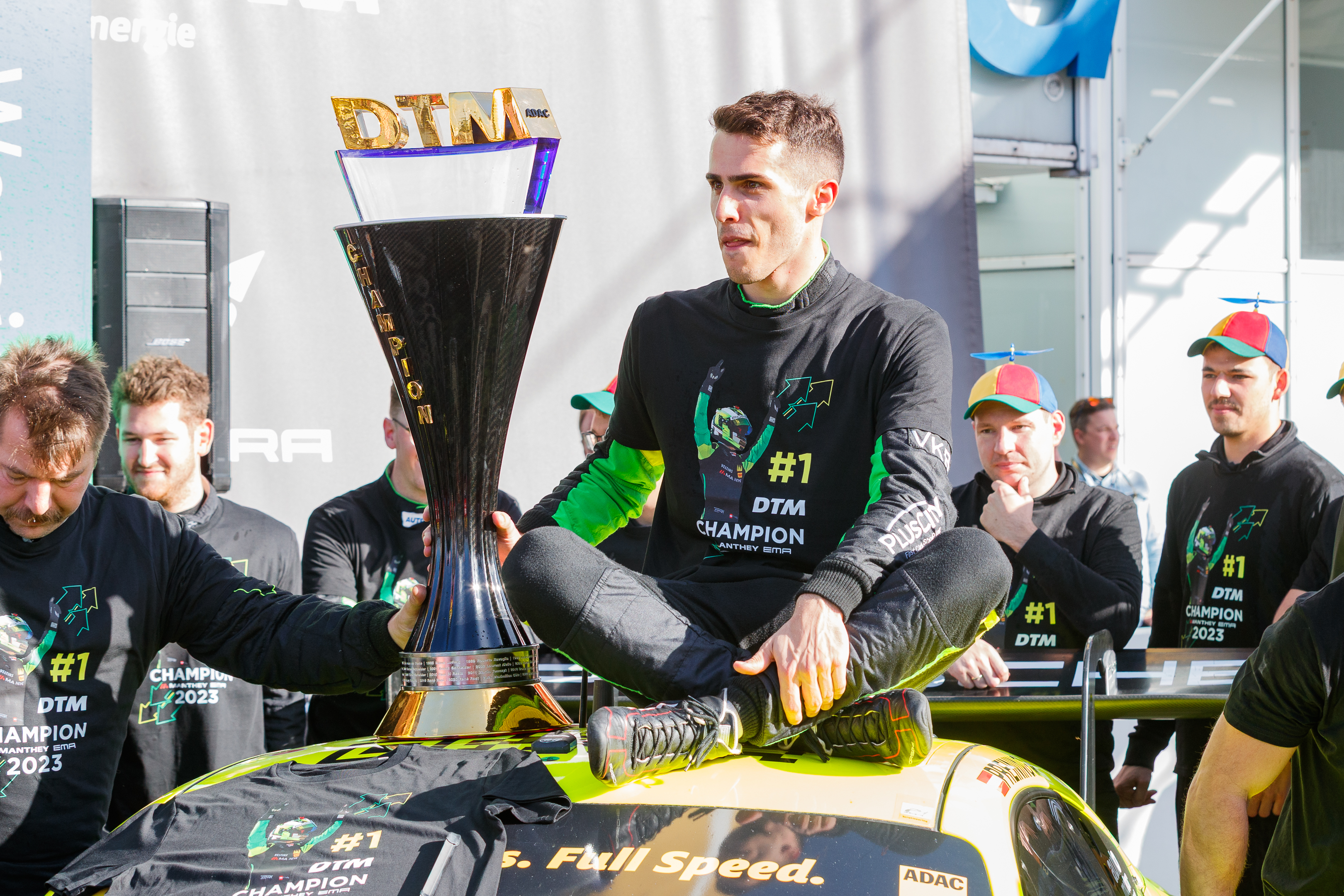
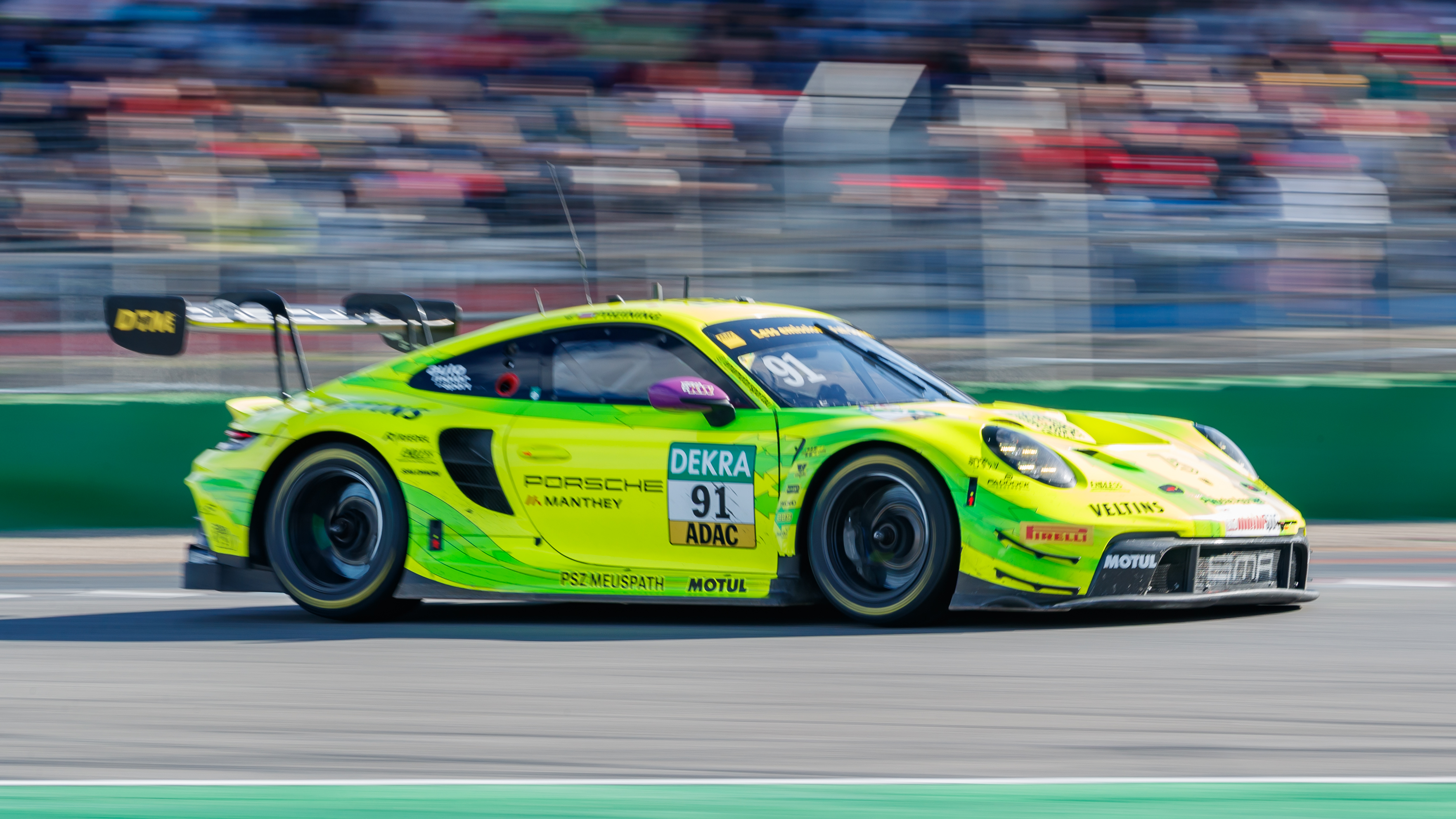
Thomas Preining was the driver's champion, driving for Manthey EMA, who were the teams' champions

The 2023 Deutsche Tourenwagen Masters was the thirty-seventh season of the premier German motor racing championship and also the twenty-fourth season under the moniker of Deutsche Tourenwagen Masters since the series' resumption in 2000. It was the third season of the DTM to be run under Group GT3 regulations, and the first season with ADAC as the promoter after ITR ceased operations at the end of the previous year.

== Teams and drivers ==
All teams competed with tyres supplied by Pirelli. On 22 February all participating teams were announced.

Manufacturer	Car	Engine	Team	No.	Driver	Status	Rounds	Ref.
Audi	Audi R8 LMS Evo II	Audi DAR 5.2 L V10	(Germany) Abt Sportsline	3	(South Africa) Kelvin van der Linde		All	
Audi	Audi R8 LMS Evo II	Audi DAR 5.2 L V10	(Germany) Abt Sportsline	7	(Switzerland) Ricardo Feller		All	
Audi	Audi R8 LMS Evo II	Audi DAR 5.2 L V10	(Germany) Liqui Moly Team Engstler	8	(Germany) Luca Engstler		All	
Audi	Audi R8 LMS Evo II	Audi DAR 5.2 L V10	(Germany) Tresor Attempto Racing	40	(Italy) Mattia Drudi		All	
Audi	Audi R8 LMS Evo II	Audi DAR 5.2 L V10	(Germany) Tresor Attempto Racing	83	(Switzerland) Patric Niederhauser		All	
BMW	BMW M4 GT3	BMW S58B30T0 3.0 L Twin Turbo I6	(Germany) Schubert Motorsport	1	(South Africa) Sheldon van der Linde		All	
BMW	BMW M4 GT3	BMW S58B30T0 3.0 L Twin Turbo I6	(Germany) Schubert Motorsport	33	(Germany) René Rast		1, 3–8	
BMW	BMW M4 GT3	BMW S58B30T0 3.0 L Twin Turbo I6	(Germany) Schubert Motorsport	33	(Belgium) Dries Vanthoor		2	
BMW	BMW M4 GT3	BMW S58B30T0 3.0 L Twin Turbo I6	(Germany) Project 1	11	(Germany) Marco Wittmann		All	
BMW	BMW M4 GT3	BMW S58B30T0 3.0 L Twin Turbo I6	(Germany) Project 1	56	(Germany) Sandro Holzem	G	4	
BMW	BMW M4 GT3	BMW S58B30T0 3.0 L Twin Turbo I6	(Germany) Project 1	56	(Germany) Sandro Holzem		5–8	
Ferrari	Ferrari 296 GT3	Ferrari F163 3.0 L Twin Turbo V6	(Switzerland) Emil Frey Racing	14	(United Kingdom) Jack Aitken		1, 3–8	
Ferrari	Ferrari 296 GT3	Ferrari F163 3.0 L Twin Turbo V6	(Switzerland) Emil Frey Racing	14	(Spain) Albert Costa		2	
Ferrari	Ferrari 296 GT3	Ferrari F163 3.0 L Twin Turbo V6	(Switzerland) Emil Frey Racing	69	(Netherlands) Thierry Vermeulen		All	
Lamborghini	Lamborghini Huracán GT3 Evo 2	Lamborghini DGF 5.2 L V10	(Germany) SSR Performance	6	(Italy) Alessio Deledda		All	
Lamborghini	Lamborghini Huracán GT3 Evo 2	Lamborghini DGF 5.2 L V10	(Germany) SSR Performance	92	(Italy) Mirko Bortolotti		All	
Lamborghini	Lamborghini Huracán GT3 Evo 2	Lamborghini DGF 5.2 L V10	(Germany) SSR Performance	94	(France) Franck Perera		All	
Lamborghini	Lamborghini Huracán GT3 Evo 2	Lamborghini DGF 5.2 L V10	(Austria) GRT Grasser Racing Team	19	(Austria) Mick Wishofer		1–3	
Lamborghini	Lamborghini Huracán GT3 Evo 2	Lamborghini DGF 5.2 L V10	(Austria) GRT Grasser Racing Team	19	(Germany) Maximilian Paul		4–5	
Lamborghini	Lamborghini Huracán GT3 Evo 2	Lamborghini DGF 5.2 L V10	(Austria) GRT Grasser Racing Team	19	(Italy) Andrea Caldarelli		7	
Lamborghini	Lamborghini Huracán GT3 Evo 2	Lamborghini DGF 5.2 L V10	(Austria) GRT Grasser Racing Team	19	(Germany) Christian Engelhart		8	
Lamborghini	Lamborghini Huracán GT3 Evo 2	Lamborghini DGF 5.2 L V10	(Austria) GRT Grasser Racing Team	63	(Austria) Clemens Schmid		All	
Mercedes-AMG	Mercedes-AMG GT3 Evo	Mercedes-AMG M159 6.2 L V8	(Germany) Mercedes-AMG Team HRT	4	(Germany) Luca Stolz		All	
Mercedes-AMG	Mercedes-AMG GT3 Evo	Mercedes-AMG M159 6.2 L V8	(Germany) Mercedes-AMG Team HRT	36	(India) Arjun Maini		All	
Mercedes-AMG	Mercedes-AMG GT3 Evo	Mercedes-AMG M159 6.2 L V8	(United States) Mercedes-AMG Team Winward	22	(Austria) Lucas Auer		All	
Mercedes-AMG	Mercedes-AMG GT3 Evo	Mercedes-AMG M159 6.2 L V8	(United States) Mercedes-AMG Team Winward	27	(Germany) David Schumacher		All	
Mercedes-AMG	Mercedes-AMG GT3 Evo	Mercedes-AMG M159 6.2 L V8	(Germany) / Mercedes-AMG Team Mann-Filter (Note: Car No. 48 entered as Mercedes-AMG Team Mann-Filter, car No. 84 entered as Mercedes-AMG Team BWT. Both cars share a teams' championship entry as "Mercedes-AMG Team Landgraf".); (Germany) / Mercedes-AMG Team BWT	48	(Germany) Maro Engel		All	
Mercedes-AMG	Mercedes-AMG GT3 Evo	Mercedes-AMG M159 6.2 L V8	(Germany) / Mercedes-AMG Team Mann-Filter; (Germany) / Mercedes-AMG Team BWT	84	(Germany) Jusuf Owega		All	
Porsche	Porsche 911 GT3 R (992)	Porsche M97/80 4.2 L Flat-6	(Germany) Toksport WRT	9	(Germany) Tim Heinemann		All	
Porsche	Porsche 911 GT3 R (992)	Porsche M97/80 4.2 L Flat-6	(Germany) Toksport WRT	99	(Germany) Christian Engelhart		1–4	
Porsche	Porsche 911 GT3 R (992)	Porsche M97/80 4.2 L Flat-6	(Germany) Toksport WRT	99	(Germany) Marvin Dienst		5–8	
Porsche	Porsche 911 GT3 R (992)	Porsche M97/80 4.2 L Flat-6	(Germany) KÜS Team Bernhard	24	(Turkey) Ayhancan Güven		All	
Porsche	Porsche 911 GT3 R (992)	Porsche M97/80 4.2 L Flat-6	(Germany) KÜS Team Bernhard	75	(Germany) Laurin Heinrich		All	
Porsche	Porsche 911 GT3 R (992)	Porsche M97/80 4.2 L Flat-6	(Germany) Manthey EMA	90	(Norway) Dennis Olsen		All	
Porsche	Porsche 911 GT3 R (992)	Porsche M97/80 4.2 L Flat-6	(Germany) Manthey EMA	91	(Austria) Thomas Preining		All	

Icon	Status
G	Guest drivers ineligible for points

== Race calendar ==
Round	Circuit	Location	Race 1	Race 2
1	(Germany) Motorsport Arena Oschersleben	Oschersleben, Saxony-Anhalt	27 May	28 May
2	(Netherlands) Circuit Zandvoort	Zandvoort, North Holland	24 June	25 June
3	(Germany) Norisring	Nuremberg, Bavaria	8 July	9 July
4	(Germany) Nürburgring	Nürburg, Rhineland-Palatinate	5 August	6 August
5	(Germany) Lausitzring	Klettwitz, Brandenburg	19 August	20 August
6	(Germany) Sachsenring	Hohenstein-Ernstthal, Sachsen	9 September	10 September
7	(Austria) Red Bull Ring	Spielberg, Styria	23 September	24 September
8	(Germany) Hockenheimring	Hockenheim, Baden-Württemberg	21 October	22 October

== Results and standings ==
=== Season summary ===
Round		Circuit	Pole position	Fastest lap	Winning driver	Winning team	Winning manufacturer
1	R1	(Germany) Motorsport Arena Oschersleben	(France) Franck Perera	(Turkey) Ayhancan Güven	(France) Franck Perera	(Germany) SSR Performance	(Italy) Lamborghini
1	R2	(Germany) Motorsport Arena Oschersleben	(Austria) Thomas Preining	(Austria) Thomas Preining	(Germany) Christian Engelhart	(Germany) Toksport WRT	(Germany) Porsche
2	R1	(Netherlands) Circuit Zandvoort	(Germany) Maro Engel	(Germany) Maro Engel	(Germany) Maro Engel	(Germany) Mercedes-AMG Team Landgraf	(Germany) Mercedes-AMG
2	R2	(Netherlands) Circuit Zandvoort	(Switzerland) Ricardo Feller	(Switzerland) Ricardo Feller	(Switzerland) Ricardo Feller	(Germany) Abt Sportsline	(Germany) Audi
3	R1	(Germany) Norisring	(South Africa) Sheldon van der Linde	(Germany) Laurin Heinrich	(South Africa) Sheldon van der Linde	(Germany) Schubert Motorsport	(Germany) BMW
3	R2	(Germany) Norisring	(Germany) René Rast	(South Africa) Kelvin van der Linde	(Austria) Thomas Preining	(Germany) Manthey EMA	(Germany) Porsche
4	R1	(Germany) Nürburgring (Sprint Circuit)	(Italy) Mirko Bortolotti	(Austria) Lucas Auer	(Italy) Mirko Bortolotti	(Germany) SSR Performance	(Italy) Lamborghini
4	R2	(Germany) Nürburgring (Sprint Circuit)	(Switzerland) Ricardo Feller	(Germany) Marco Wittmann	(Germany) Maximilian Paul	(Austria) GRT Grasser Racing Team	(Italy) Lamborghini
5	R1	(Germany) Lausitzring (Sprint Circuit)	(United Kingdom) Jack Aitken	(United Kingdom) Jack Aitken	(United Kingdom) Jack Aitken	(Switzerland) Emil Frey Racing	(Italy) Ferrari
5	R2	(Germany) Lausitzring (Sprint Circuit)	(Italy) Mirko Bortolotti	(Germany) Luca Stolz	(Italy) Mirko Bortolotti	(Germany) SSR Performance	(Italy) Lamborghini
6	R1	(Germany) Sachsenring	(Germany) Luca Stolz	(Turkey) Ayhancan Güven	(Germany) Luca Stolz	(Germany) Mercedes-AMG Team HRT	(Germany) Mercedes-AMG
6	R2	(Germany) Sachsenring	(Italy) Mirko Bortolotti	(Switzerland) Ricardo Feller	(Italy) Mirko Bortolotti	(Germany) SSR Performance	(Italy) Lamborghini
7	R1	(Austria) Red Bull Ring	(Germany) Laurin Heinrich	(Germany) René Rast	(South Africa) Kelvin van der Linde	(Germany) Abt Sportsline	(Germany) Audi
7	R2	(Austria) Red Bull Ring	(Germany) René Rast	(South Africa) Sheldon van der Linde	(Germany) René Rast	(Germany) Schubert Motorsport	(Germany) BMW
8	R1	(Germany) Hockenheimring	(Austria) Thomas Preining	(Austria) Thomas Preining	(Austria) Thomas Preining	(Germany) Manthey EMA	(Germany) Porsche
8	R2	(Germany) Hockenheimring	(Austria) Thomas Preining	(South Africa) Sheldon van der Linde	(Austria) Thomas Preining	(Germany) Manthey EMA	(Germany) Porsche

=== Scoring system ===
Points were awarded to the top fifteen classified finishers as follows:

Position	**1st**	**2nd**	**3rd**	**4th**	**5th**	**6th**	**7th**	**8th**	**9th**	**10th**	**11th**	**12th**	**13th**	**14th**	**15th**
Race	25	20	16	13	11	10	9	8	7	6	5	4	3	2	1

Additionally, the top three placed drivers in qualifying also received points:

Qualifying Position	**1st**	**2nd**	**3rd**
Points	3	2	1

=== Drivers' championship ===
Pos.	Driver	OSC (Germany)		ZAN (Netherlands)		NOR (Germany)		NÜR (Germany)		LAU (Germany)		SAC (Germany)		RBR (Austria)		HOC (Germany)		Points
1	(Austria) Thomas Preining	11	**3**^{1}	7	2^{2}	12^{2}	1^{2}	3^{2}	5	15	4	2	4	6	3	**1**^{1}	**1**^{1}	246
2	(Italy) Mirko Bortolotti	8^{3}	6	4	11	6	4	**1**^{1}	DNS	2^{2}	**1**^{1}	9	**1**^{1}	9	21	5	2^{2}	213
3	(Switzerland) Ricardo Feller	4	7	15	**1**^{1}	8	14	4^{3}	**6**^{1}	7	2^{2}	4	6	3	15	4	9	179
4	(South Africa) Sheldon van der Linde	Ret	11	2^{2}	10	**1**^{1}	3^{3}	7	17^{2}	5	13	6	Ret	13	2^{2}	20	4	151
5	(Germany) René Rast	5	Ret			2	**2**^{1}	20	19	8	11	8	8	4	**1**^{1}	Ret	3	140
6	(Germany) Luca Stolz	Ret	Ret	11	3	Ret	10	15	13	6	3	**1**^{1}	2^{3}	7	Ret	8	7^{3}	133
7	(Norway) Dennis Olsen	10	4	16	9	3	6	5	Ret	12	5	7	Ret	10	5	2^{3}	12	129
8	(South Africa) Kelvin van der Linde	6	Ret	12	6	21	5	8	20	3	8	5^{3}	13	1^{2}	Ret	6	25	119
9	(Austria) Lucas Auer	16	10	6	Ret	4	11	2	3	4^{3}	6	Ret	15	15	11	15	8	111
10	(Germany) Maro Engel	13	14	**1**^{1}	5^{3}	7	9	12	4	13	Ret	Ret	Ret	5	12	17	5	107
11	(France) Franck Perera	**1**^{1}	12	3	13	11	12	23	10	Ret	Ret	11	3	19	13	14	14	95
12	(Germany) Laurin Heinrich	7	9	Ret	Ret	10	7	19	2	DSQ	Ret	12	Ret	**2**^{1}	16	10	6	94
13	(Germany) Marco Wittmann	Ret	18	5^{3}	4	9	13	6	15	10	10	18	12	8	4	9	17	91
14	(United Kingdom) Jack Aitken	3^{2}	17			17	20	22	18^{3}	**1**^{1}	7	Ret	Ret^{2}	20	8^{3}	7	10	82
15	(Turkey) Ayhancan Güven	20	Ret	13	7	5^{3}	8	Ret	WD	16	Ret	3^{2}	Ret	11^{3}	7	Ret	11	70
16	(Netherlands) Thierry Vermeulen	15	16	Ret	Ret	20	21	10	8	9	9	10	5	DSQ	9	11	23	58
17	(Germany) Christian Engelhart	9	1	23	12	Ret	17	Ret	WD							3^{2}	Ret	54
18	(Germany) Tim Heinemann	2	2^{2}	19	16	Ret	16	14	12	Ret	16	16	14	21	20	Ret	Ret	50
19	(Austria) Clemens Schmid	12	5^{3}	21	Ret	18	Ret	18	DSQ	11	Ret^{3}	Ret	17	25	6	12	24	32
20	(India) Arjun Maini	Ret	15	17	17	13	15	16	DSQ	Ret	14	13	7	14	10	Ret	13	30
21	(Germany) Maximilian Paul							13	1	19	Ret							28
22	(Germany) Jusuf Owega	14	8	10	Ret	Ret	18	17	16	14	17	14	10	Ret	19	22	15	28
23	(Switzerland) Patric Niederhauser	Ret	19	20	8	15	Ret	9	Ret	Ret	Ret	Ret	9	23	17	19	19	23
24	(Germany) Luca Engstler	17	DSQ	14	14	Ret	19	Ret	7	DSQ	15	19	Ret	12	Ret	Ret	22	18
25	(Germany) David Schumacher	18	13	Ret	15	16	Ret	Ret	9	DSQ	Ret	17	11	18	18	18	16	16
26	(Italy) Mattia Drudi	Ret	Ret	18	DSQ	14	Ret	11	11	Ret	Ret	Ret	Ret	16	Ret	16	20	13
27	(Germany) Marvin Dienst									18	12	15	Ret	22	14	13	18	11
28	(Spain) Albert Costa			8	Ret													8
29	(Belgium) Dries Vanthoor			9	Ret													7
30	(Germany) Sandro Holzem (Note: Sandro Holzem was a guest driver for round 4, but was a full-time driver from round 5 onwards.)							21	14	17	18	20	16	24	Ret	21	21	0
31	(Italy) Andrea Caldarelli													17	DSQ			0
32	(Italy) Alessio Deledda	19	20	24	Ret	19	Ret	Ret	DSQ	Ret	19	21	18	26	22	Ret	Ret	0
33	(Austria) Mick Wishofer	Ret	Ret	22	Ret	DSQ	Ret											0
Pos.	Driver	OSC (Germany)		ZAN (Netherlands)		NOR (Germany)		NÜR (Germany)		LAU (Germany)		SAC (Germany)		RBR (Austria)		HOC (Germany)		Points

Colour	Result
Gold	Winner
Silver	Second place
Bronze	Third place
Green	Points classification
Blue	Non-points classification
Blue	Non-classified finish (NC)
Purple	Retired, not classified (Ret)
Red	Did not qualify (DNQ)
Red	Did not pre-qualify (DNPQ)
Black	Disqualified (DSQ)
White	Did not start (DNS)
White	Withdrew (WD)
White	Race cancelled (C)
Blank	Did not practice (DNP)
Blank	Did not arrive (DNA)
Blank	Excluded (EX)

**Bold** – Pole

Italics – Fastest Lap

1 – 3 Points for Pole

2 – 2 Points for P2

3 – 1 Point for P3

=== Teams' championship ===
Pos.	Team	Points
1	(Germany) Manthey EMA	357
2	(Germany) SSR Performance	291
3	(Germany) Abt Sportsline	286
4	(Germany) Schubert Motorsport	282
5	(Germany) Mercedes-AMG Team HRT	158
6	(Germany) KÜS Team Bernhard	157
7	(Switzerland) Emil Frey Racing	139
8	(Germany) Mercedes-AMG Team Landgraf	131
9	(United States) Mercedes-AMG Team Winward	126
10	(Germany) Toksport WRT	95
11	(Germany) Project 1	90
12	(Austria) GRT Grasser Racing Team	74
13	(Germany) Tresor Attempto Racing	36
14	(Germany) Liqui Moly Team Engstler	18

=== Manufacturers' championship ===
Only points scored by the top three drivers of a manufacturer in races count for the manufacturers' championship.

Pos.	Manufacturer	Points
1	(Germany) Porsche	464
2	(Italy) Lamborghini	396
3	(Germany) Mercedes-AMG	364
4	(Germany) BMW	356
5	(Germany) Audi	336
6	(Italy) Ferrari	199

== Bibliography ==
- Runschke, Oliver; Upietz, Tim (15 December 2023). DTM 2023: Das offizielle Jahrbuch der DTM. Duisburg: Gruppe C Motorsport Verlag. ISBN 978-3-948501-28-0.
