= Rafael Durán (racing driver) =

Spanish and American racing driver (born 2006)

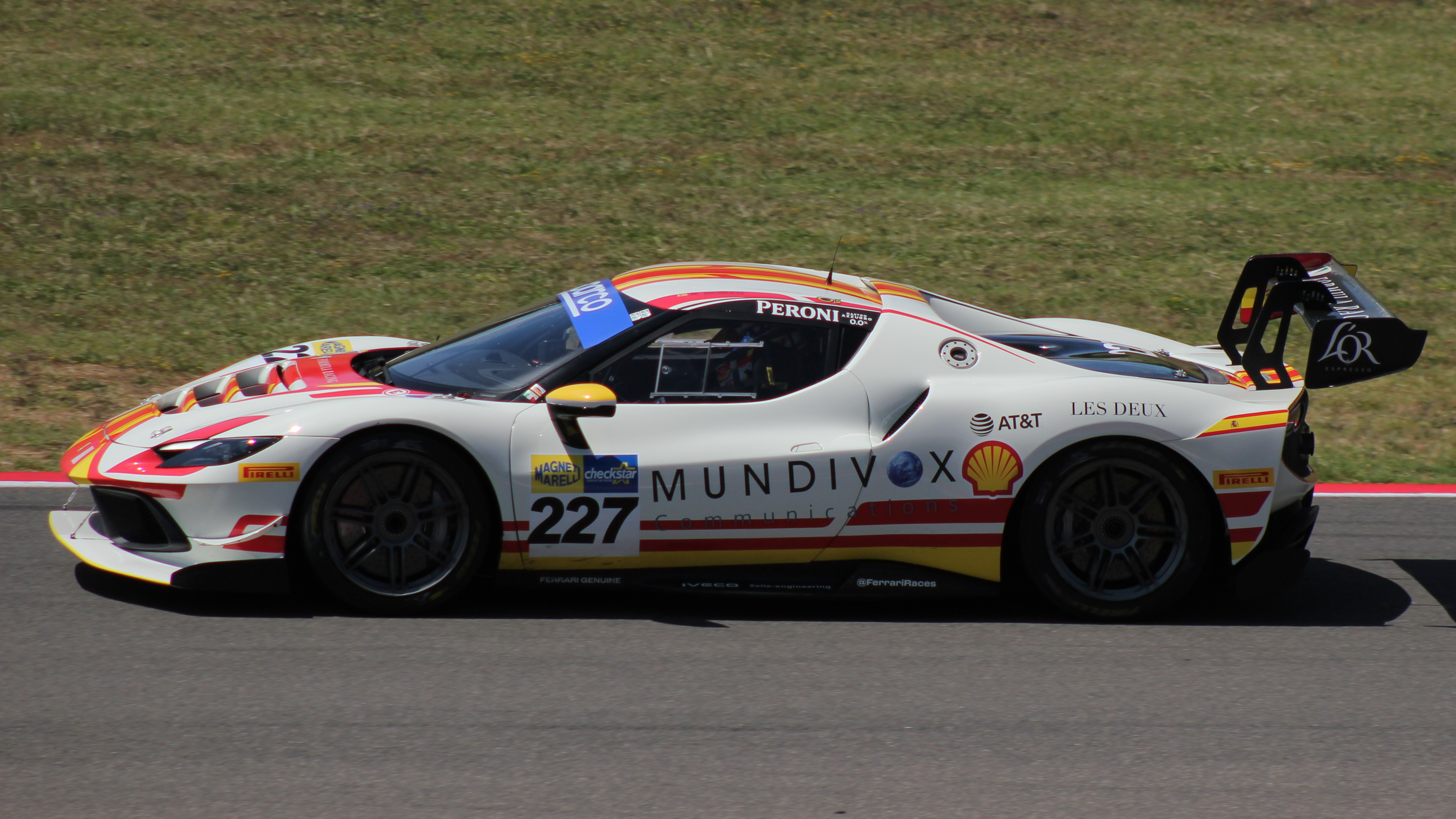
- Durán in 2025
- Nationality: (Spain) Spanish (United States) American
- Born: 27 January 2006 (age 20) Linares, Jaén, Spain

GT World Challenge Europe Endurance Cup career
- Debut season: 2025
- Current team: Rinaldi Racing
- Categorisation: FIA Silver
- Car number: 45
- Starts: 4
- Wins: 1
- Podiums: 1
- Poles: 0
- Fastest laps: 0
- Best finish: NC in 2025

Previous series
- 2025 2025: Ferrari Challenge North America; Ferrari Challenge Europe

Championship titles
- 2026: Italian GT Championship Endurance Cup – GT3 Pro-Am

Rafael Alberto Durán (born 27 January 2006) is a Spanish and American racing driver who last competed in the GT World Challenge Europe Endurance Cup for Rinaldi Racing, the International GT Open for AF Corse and the Italian GT Championship for Spirit of Race.

== Personal life ==
Durán was born in Linares, Spain in 2006, and grew up in Miami, Florida for 7 years. He later lived in Singapore, Paris and São Paulo, before settling in the United States to study mechanical engineering at the University of Pennsylvania. His mother is from Linares; his father, Alberto, is a naturalised American citizen born in Chile and raised in Rio de Janeiro. He and Rafael raced together in Ferrari Challenge in 2025.

Durán has raced under the flags of Spain, United States, Brazil and Italy during his career.

== Career ==
Durán was active in karting from age 4 to 8, before taking a hiatus to focus on his studies in Singapore.

After testing the Ferrari 296 Challenge throughout 2024, Durán made his racing debut in 2025, entering select rounds of the GT Winter Series for AF Corse and taking a Cup 1 win at Portimão with Sean Hudspeth. Durán then began competing in Ferrari Challenge in both Europe and North America, where he won once in Trofeo Pirelli Am in the overseas round at Mugello. Towards the end of the year, Durán made his GT3 debut for Rinaldi Racing in the last two rounds of the GT World Challenge Europe Endurance Cup, and scored a GT3 Am podium on his Italian GT Sprint Cup debut at Imola.

In early 2026, Durán took part in the UAE swing of the 24H Series Middle East for Porsche-fielding Dinamic GT. Returning to Ferrari 296 GT3 machinery for the rest of the year, Durán joined Rinaldi Racing in the GT World Challenge Europe Endurance Cup, AF Corse in the International GT Open and Spirit of Race in the Italian GT Championship. In GTWCE, Durán won the 24 Hours of Spa in Silver Cup alongside Dylan Medler, David Perel and Alessandro Balzan, and ended the season 13th in the class standings after missing the finale due to a foot injury he picked up in GT Open. Partnering new Ferrari factory driver Tommaso Mosca in GT Open, Durán scored an overall podium in race two at the Hungaroring, injured both feet at Monza and finished the season seventh overall. Partnering Perel in the Pro-Am class of Italian GT, Durán scored two class podiums at Mugello in the Sprint Cup to take seventh in points, and a pair of podiums in Endurance en route to the GT3 Pro-Am title. At the end of the year, Durán remained with AF Corse to race in the GT3 class of the 2026–27 Asian Le Mans Series.

== Racing record ==
=== Racing career summary ===
| Season | Series | Team | Races | Wins | Poles | F/Laps | Podiums | Points | Position |
|---|---|---|---|---|---|---|---|---|---|
| 2025 | GT Winter Series – Cup 1 | AF Corse | 6 | 1 | 0 | 0 | 3 | 84 | 6th |
| 2025 | Italian GT Championship Sprint Cup – GT Cup Div.1 Am | AF Corse | 2 | 0 | 0 | 0 | 1 | 22 | NC |
| 2025 | Ferrari Challenge North America – Trofeo Pirelli Am | The Collection | 6 | 1 | 2 | 1 | 1 | 148 | 14th |
| 2025 | Ferrari Challenge Europe – Trofeo Pirelli Am | Formula Racing | 6 | 0 | 0 | 0 | 0 | 10 | 18th |
| 2025 | GT World Challenge Europe Endurance Cup | Rinaldi Racing | 1 | 0 | 0 | 0 | 0 | 0 | NC |
| 2025 | GT World Challenge Europe Endurance Cup – Silver | Rinaldi Racing | 1 | 0 | 0 | 0 | 0 | 0 | NC |
| 2025 | Italian GT Championship Sprint Cup – GT3 Am | AF Corse | 2 | 0 | 0 | 0 | 1 | 22 | NC |
| 2025 | Ferrari Challenge World Finals – Trofeo Pirelli Am | The Collection | 1 | 0 | 0 | 0 | 0 | —N/a | 12th |
| 2025–26 | 24H Series Middle East – GT3 Am | Dinamic GT | 2 | 0 | 0 | 0 | 0 | 50 | 6th |
| 2026 | GT World Challenge Europe Endurance Cup | Rinaldi Racing | 4 | 0 | 0 | 0 | 0 | 0 | NC |
| 2026 | GT World Challenge Europe Endurance Cup – Silver | Rinaldi Racing | 4 | 1 | 0 | 0 | 1 | 35 | 13th |
| 2026 | Intercontinental GT Challenge | Rinaldi Racing | 1 | 0 | 0 | 0 | 0 | 0 | NC |
| 2026 | International GT Open | AF Corse | 14 | 0 | 0 | 2 | 1 | 59 | 7th |
| 2026 | Italian GT Championship Sprint Cup – GT3 | Spirit of Race | 5 | 0 | 0 | 0 | 0 | 6 | 18th |
| 2026 | Italian GT Championship Sprint Cup – GT3 Pro-Am | Spirit of Race | 5 | 0 | 0 | 0 | 2 | 37 | 7th |
| 2026 | Italian GT Championship Endurance Cup – GT3 | Spirit of Race | 4 | 0 | 1 | 1 | 1 | 31 | 7th |
| 2026 | Italian GT Championship Endurance Cup – GT3 Pro-Am | Spirit of Race | 4 | 0 | 2 | 2 | 2 | 80 | **1st** |
| 2026–27 | Asian Le Mans Series – GT3 | AF Corse | | | | | | * | * |

* Season still in progress.

^{†} As Durán was a guest driver, he was ineligible for points.

=== Complete GT World Challenge Europe results ===
==== GT World Challenge Europe Endurance Cup ====
(Races in bold indicate pole position) (Races in italics indicate fastest lap)

| Year | Team | Car | Class | 1 | 2 | 3 | 4 | 5 | 6 | 7 | Pos. | Points |
|---|---|---|---|---|---|---|---|---|---|---|---|---|
| 2025 | Rinaldi Racing | Ferrari 296 GT3 | Silver | LEC | MNZ | SPA; 6H | SPA; 12H | SPA; 24H | NÜR; DNS | CAT; 38 | NC | 0 |
| 2026 | Rinaldi Racing | Ferrari 296 GT3 Evo | Silver | LEC; 42 | MNZ; 19 | SPA; 6H; 42 | SPA; 12H; 29 | SPA; 24H; 14 | NÜR; Ret | ALG | 13th | 35 |

=== Complete International GT Open results ===
(key) (Races in bold indicate pole position) (Races in italics indicate fastest lap)

| Year | Team | Car | Class | 1 | 2 | 3 | 4 | 5 | 6 | 7 | 8 | 9 | 10 | 11 | 12 | 13 | 14 | Pos. | Points |
|---|---|---|---|---|---|---|---|---|---|---|---|---|---|---|---|---|---|---|---|
| 2026 | AF Corse | Ferrari 296 GT3 Evo | Pro | ALG; 1; 17 | ALG; 2; 5 | SPA; 25 | MIS; 1; 11 | MIS; 2; 4 | HUN; 1; 9 | HUN; 2; 3 | LEC; 1; 6 | LEC; 2; 9 | HOC; 1; 4 | HOC; 2; 14 | MNZ; 6 | CAT; 1; 9 | CAT; 2; 5 | 7th | 59 |

=== Complete Asian Le Mans Series results ===
(key) (Races in bold indicate pole position) (Races in italics indicate fastest lap)

| Year | Entrant | Class | Chassis | Engine | 1 | 2 | 3 | 4 | 5 | 6 | Rank | Points |
|---|---|---|---|---|---|---|---|---|---|---|---|---|
| 2026–27 | AF Corse | GT | Ferrari 296 GT3 Evo | Ferrari F163CE 3.0 L Turbo V6 | LEC; 1; 5 | **LEC**; **2**; 2 | JER; 1 | JER; 2 | ALG; 1 | ALG; 2 | 2nd* | 29* |
