= 2018 Porsche Carrera Cup Germany =

Motor racing competition

The 2018 Porsche Carrera Cup Deutschland season was the 33rd German Porsche Carrera Cup season. It began on 14 April at Oschersleben and finished on 23 September at Hockenheimring after six double-header meetings, It is a support championship for the ADAC GT Masters.

== Teams and drivers ==
| Team | No. | Drivers | Class | Rounds |
|---|---|---|---|---|
| (Germany) Raceunion | 3 | (Germany) Lukas Ertl | R | All |
| (Germany) Raceunion | 13 | (Germany) Wolfgang Triller | G | 2 |
| (Germany) Raceunion | 20 | (Sweden) Henric Skoog | | All |
| (Germany) Raceunion | 37 | (Poland) Igor Waliłko | R | All |
| (Germany) Raceunion | 87 | (Germany) Richard Wagner | R | All |
| (Germany) Raceunion | 96 | (Germany) Bertram Hornung | Am | 7 |
| (Germany) Black Falcon | 4 | (Germany) Sören Spreng | Am | All |
| (Germany) Black Falcon Team TMD Friction | 5 | (Germany) Tim Zimmermann | R | All |
| (Germany) Black Falcon Team TMD Friction | 6 | (Luxembourg) Carlos Rivas | Am | All |
| (Germany) Car Collection Motorsport | 7 | (Germany) Toni Wolf | | All |
| (Germany) Car Collection Motorsport | 17 | (Germany) Matthias Weiland | Am | 1–5, 7 |
| (Germany) Car Collection Motorsport | 17 | (Germany) Oliver Mayer | Am | 6 |
| (Austria) BWT Lechner Racing | 10 | (Austria) Thomas Preining | | All |
| (Austria) BWT Lechner Racing | 11 | (Germany) Michael Ammermüller | | All |
| (Germany) Cito Pretiosa | 12 | (Germany) Jörn Schmidt-Staade | Am | All |
| (Germany) Cito Pretiosa | 22 | (Germany) Matthias Jeserich | Am | 1 |
| (Germany) Cito Pretiosa | 22 | (Germany) Peter Scheufen | Am | 2–3, 5–7 |
| (Germany) Cito Pretiosa | 33 | (Germany) Stefan Rehkopf | Am | All |
| (Germany) MRS GT-Racing | 14 | (Norway) Marius Nakken | | All |
| (Germany) MRS GT-Racing | 15 | (Belgium) Glenn van Parijs | R | 1–6 |
| (Germany) MRS GT-Racing | 15 | (Kuwait) Zaid Ashkanani | | 7 |
| (Germany) MRS GT-Racing | 70 | (United States) Richard Heistand | G | 1, 5 |
| (Germany) Team Deutsche Post by Project 1 | 16 | (Sweden) Gustav Malja | R | All |
| (Germany) Team Deutsche Post by Project 1 | 93 | (Netherlands) Larry ten Voorde | R | All |
| (Germany) Team Project 1 | 18 | (United States) Michael DeQuesada | R | All |
| (Germany) Team Project 1 | 24 | (United States) Jake Eidson | R | All |
| (Austria) Lechner Racing | 27 | (France) Jean-Baptiste Simmenauer | R | 1–5, 7 |
| (Austria) Lechner Racing | 28 | (Luxembourg) Dylan Pereira | R | All |
| (Austria) Lechner Racing | 71 | (Oman) Al Faisal Al Zubair | G | 7 |
| (Germany) QA Racing by Kurt Ecke | 66 | (Germany) Andreas Sczepansky | Am | All |
| (Poland) FÖRCH Racing | 68 | (Poland) Robert Lukas | | All |
| (Poland) FÖRCH Racing | 69 | (Germany) Stefan Oschmann | Am | 1–2 |
| (Poland) FÖRCH Racing | 69 | (Netherlands) Jaap van Lagen | | 3–7 |
| (Germany) MRS Cup-Racing | 70 | (United States) Richard Heistand | G | 2 |
| (Germany) MRS Cup-Racing | 73 | (Austria) Philipp Sager | G | 2 |
| (Bahrain) Lechner Racing Middle East | 71 | (Oman) Al Faisal Al Zubair | G | 2 |
| (Bahrain) Lechner Racing Middle East | 72 | (Oman) Khalid Al Wahaib | G | 2 |
| (France) Martinet by Alméras | 74 | (France) Julien Andlauer | G | 2 |
| (France) Martinet by Alméras | 75 | (France) Florian Latorre | G | 2 |
| (Germany) Team CARTECH Motorsport by Nigrin | 76 | (Germany) Matthias Jeserich | Am | 7 |
| (Germany) Schütz Motorsport | 77 | (Bulgaria) Georgi Donchev | Am | 7 |
| (Germany) MSG / HRT Motorsport | 97 | (Germany) Kim Andre Hauschild | Am | 1 |
| (Germany) MSG / HRT Motorsport | 97 | (Austria) Luca Rettenbacher | | 2 |
| (Germany) MSG / HRT Motorsport | 97 | (Germany) Sandro Kaibach | R | 3–7 |
| (Germany) MSG / HRT Motorsport | 98 | (Germany) Tom Lautenschlager | R | All |
| (Germany) MSG / HRT Motorsport | 99 | (United States) Kris Wright | R | 1–4, 6 |
| (Germany) MSG / HRT Motorsport | 99 | (Turkey) Ayhancan Güven | R | 5, 7 |

| Icon | Class |
|---|---|
| Am | Amateur class |
| R | Rookie |
| G | Guest |

== Race calendar and results ==
| Round | | Circuit | Date | Pole position | Fastest lap | Winning driver | Winning team | Am-class winner |
|---|---|---|---|---|---|---|---|---|
| 1 | R1 | (Germany) Motorsport Arena Oschersleben, Saxony-Anhalt | 14 April | (Germany) Michael Ammermüller | (Germany) Michael Ammermüller | (Germany) Michael Ammermüller | (Austria) BWT Lechner Racing | (Germany) Jörn Schmidt-Staade |
| 1 | R2 | (Germany) Motorsport Arena Oschersleben, Saxony-Anhalt | 15 April | (Germany) Michael Ammermüller | (Luxembourg) Dylan Pereira | (Germany) Michael Ammermüller | (Austria) BWT Lechner Racing | (Germany) Jörn Schmidt-Staade |
| 2 | R1 | (Austria) Red Bull Ring, Spielberg | 9 June | (Austria) Thomas Preining | (Austria) Thomas Preining | (Austria) Thomas Preining | (Austria) BWT Lechner Racing | (Germany) Jörn Schmidt-Staade |
| 2 | R2 | (Austria) Red Bull Ring, Spielberg | 10 June | (Austria) Thomas Preining | (Austria) Thomas Preining | (Austria) Thomas Preining | (Austria) BWT Lechner Racing | (Germany) Jörn Schmidt-Staade |
| 3 | R1 | (Germany) Nürburgring, Rhineland-Palatinate (Sprint circuit) | 4 August | (Austria) Thomas Preining | (Austria) Thomas Preining | (Austria) Thomas Preining | (Austria) BWT Lechner Racing | (Luxembourg) Carlos Rivas |
| 3 | R2 | (Germany) Nürburgring, Rhineland-Palatinate (Sprint circuit) | 5 August | (Austria) Thomas Preining | (Germany) Michael Ammermüller | (Austria) Thomas Preining | (Austria) BWT Lechner Racing | (Luxembourg) Carlos Rivas |
| 4 | R1 | (Germany) Nürburgring, Rhineland-Palatinate (GP circuit) | 11 August | (Austria) Thomas Preining | (Austria) Thomas Preining | (Netherlands) Jaap van Lagen | (Poland) FÖRCH Racing | (Germany) Stefan Rehkopf |
| 4 | R2 | (Germany) Nürburgring, Rhineland-Palatinate (GP circuit) | 12 August | (Austria) Thomas Preining | (Austria) Thomas Preining | (Austria) Thomas Preining | (Austria) BWT Lechner Racing | (Luxembourg) Carlos Rivas |
| 5 | R1 | (Netherlands) Circuit Park Zandvoort, Noord-Holland | 18 August | (Austria) Thomas Preining | (Austria) Thomas Preining | (Austria) Thomas Preining | (Austria) BWT Lechner Racing | (Luxembourg) Carlos Rivas |
| 5 | R2 | (Netherlands) Circuit Park Zandvoort, Noord-Holland | 19 August | (Netherlands) Jaap van Lagen | (Austria) Thomas Preining | (Netherlands) Jaap van Lagen | (Poland) FÖRCH Racing | (Luxembourg) Carlos Rivas |
| 6 | R1 | (Germany) Sachsenring, Hohenstein-Ernstthal | 8 September | (Austria) Thomas Preining | (Austria) Thomas Preining | (Austria) Thomas Preining | (Austria) BWT Lechner Racing | (Luxembourg) Carlos Rivas |
| 6 | R2 | (Germany) Sachsenring, Hohenstein-Ernstthal | 9 September | (Austria) Thomas Preining | (Austria) Thomas Preining | (Austria) Thomas Preining | (Austria) BWT Lechner Racing | (Luxembourg) Carlos Rivas |
| 7 | R1 | (Germany) Hockenheimring, Baden-Württemberg | 22 September | (Austria) Thomas Preining | (Austria) Thomas Preining | (Austria) Thomas Preining | (Austria) BWT Lechner Racing | (Luxembourg) Carlos Rivas |
| 7 | R2 | (Germany) Hockenheimring, Baden-Württemberg | 23 September | (Austria) Thomas Preining | (Austria) Thomas Preining | (Austria) Thomas Preining | (Austria) BWT Lechner Racing | (Germany) Jörn Schmidt-Staade |
