= Mike David Ortmann =

German racing driver (born 1999)

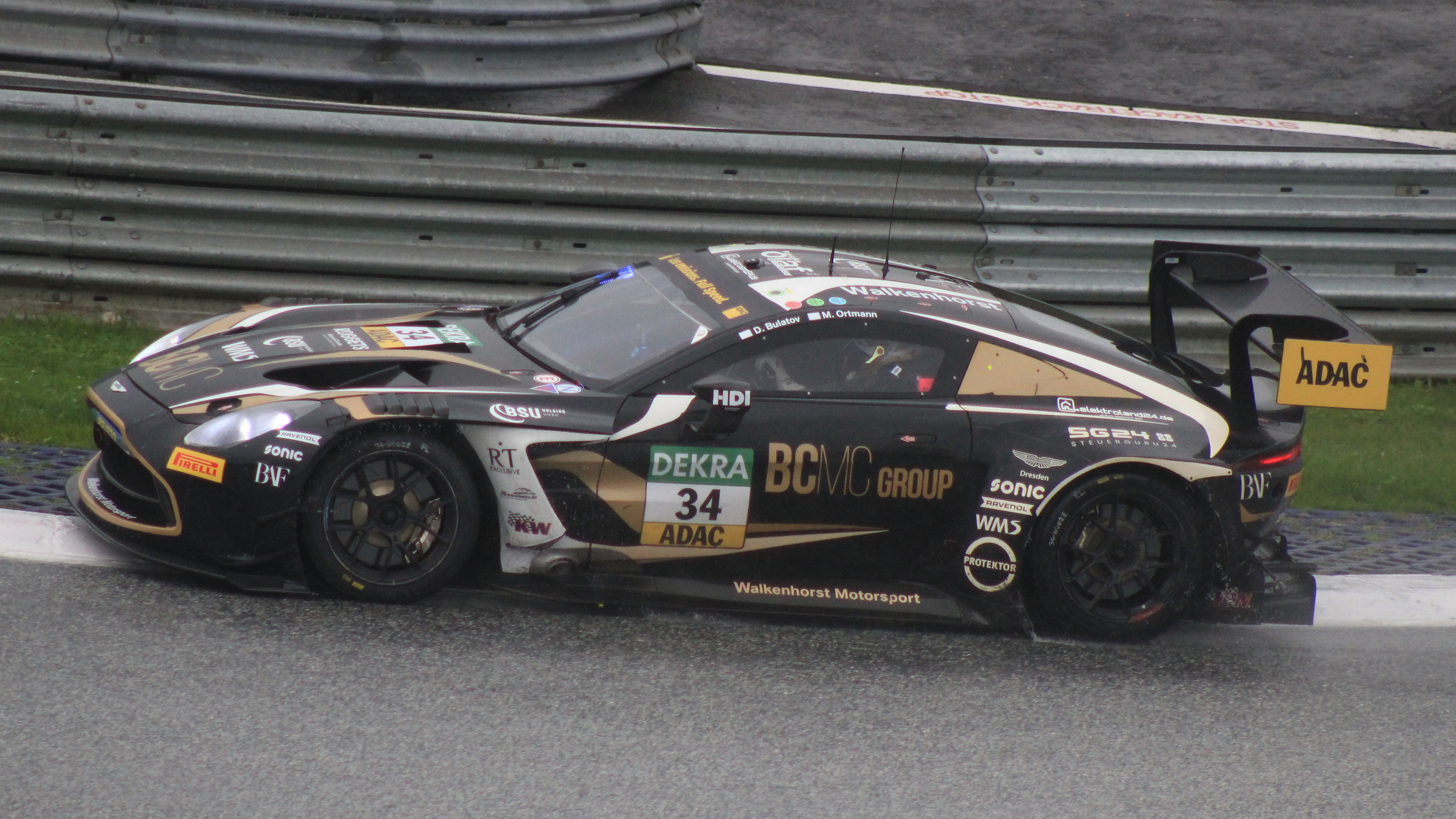
- Ortmann in 2024
- Nationality: (Germany) German
- Born: 26 October 1999 (age 27) Brandenburg, Germany

ADAC GT Masters career
- Debut season: 2024
- Current team: Walkenhorst Motorsport
- Categorisation: FIA Silver
- Car number: 34

Previous series
- ADAC GT4 Germany; ADAC Formula 4

Mike David Ortmann (born 26 October 1999 in Brandenburg) is a German racing driver who last competed for Heart of Racing Team in the Michelin Pilot Challenge.

A race winner in ADAC Formula 4 for Mücke Motorsport, Ortmann graduated to sports car racing in 2017, becoming the youngest ever ADAC GT Masters driver at 17 years of age. He is best known as a two-time ADAC GT4 Germany champion for PROsport Racing. In 2024, Ortmann was selected as the winner of the Aston Martin Racing Driver Academy shootout.

== Career ==
=== Karting ===
Ortmann began karting in 2010 at the age of eleven.

=== Formula 4 ===
In 2015, Ortmann graduated to single-seaters, partaking in the inaugural ADAC Formula 4 Championship. He finished twelfth overall. He took second in the rookies championship.

=== ADAC GT Masters ===
Ortmann joined the 2017 ADAC GT Masters to drive an Audi R8 for Mücke Motorsport.

== Racing record ==
=== Career summary ===
Season	Series	Team	Races	Wins	Poles	F/Laps	Podiums	Points	Position
2015	ADAC Formula 4 Championship	ADAC Berlin-Brandenburg e.V.	24	0	0	0	0	78	12th
2015	Italian F4 Championship	kfzteile24 Mücke Motorsport	6	0	0	0	0	16	20th
2016	ADAC Formula 4 Championship	ADAC Berlin-Brandenburg e.V.	24	3	1	1	10	247	**3rd**
2017	ADAC GT Masters	BWT Mücke Motorsport	14	0	0	0	0	22	26th
2018	ADAC GT Masters	BWT Mücke Motorsport	14	0	0	0	1	42	14th
2018	24H GT Series - A6	BWT Mücke Motorsport	1	0	0	0	1	0	NC†
2018	Dubai 24 Hour - A6 Pro	BWT Mücke Motorsport	1	0	0	0	0	N/A	4th
2018	24 Hours of Nürburgring - SP10	PROsport Performance	1	0	0	0	0	N/A	DNF
2018	VLN Series	PROsport Performance	3	0	0	0	0	14.8	368th
2019	ADAC GT Masters	BWT Mücke Motorsport	14	0	0	0	0	80	12th
2019	24H GT Series - A6	BWT Mücke Motorsport	1	0	0	0	0	0	NC†
2019	Dubai 24 Hour - A6 Pro	BWT Mücke Motorsport	1	0	0	0	0	N/A	6th
2019	ADAC GT4 Germany	PROpeak Performance	2	0	0	0	0	23	25th
2019	GT4 European Series - Silver	PROsport Performance	2	0	0	0	0	0	NC†
2019	24 Hours of Nürburgring - SP10	PROsport Performance	1	0	0	0	0	0	DNF
2019	VLN Series - SP10	PROsport Performance	1	0	0	0	0	4.38	30th
2019	VLN Series - Cup 3	Overdrive Racing	2	0	0	0	0	7.31	29th
2019	24H GT Series - GT4	PROsport Performance AMR	1	0	0	0	0	0	NC†
2020	ADAC GT Masters	BWT Mücke Motorsport	2	0	0	0	0	0	NC
2020	ADAC GT Masters	EFP Car Collection by TECE	2	0	0	0	0	0	NC
2020	24H GT Series - GT3	Car Collection Motorsport	1	0	0	0	1	0	NC†
2020	Dubai 24 Hour - GT3 Pro	Car Collection Motorsport	1	0	0	0	1	N/A	**2nd**
2020	24 Hours of Nürburgring - SP9	Car Collection Motorsport	1	0	0	0	0	N/A	15th
2020	NLS Series - SP9 Pro	Car Collection Motorsport	5	0	0	0	0	9.77	53rd
2021	ADAC GT Masters	GRT Grasser Racing Team	14	0	0	0	0	31	24th
2021	DTM Trophy	PROsport Racing	5	0	1	0	0	20	14th
2021	ADAC GT4 Germany	PROsport Racing	6	3	0	0	3	0	NC†
2022	GT4 European Series - Silver	PROsport Racing	11	3	0	0	7	142	**3rd**
2022	ADAC GT4 Germany	PROsport Racing	12	4	4	1	5	185	**1st**
2022	24 Hours of Nürburgring - SP10	PROsport Racing	1	0	0	0	1	N/A	**2nd**
2022	NASCAR Whelen Euro Series - EuroNASCAR Pro	Marko Stipp Motorsport	0	0	0	0	0	20	46th
2022	24H GT Series - GT4	PROsport Performance AMR	1	0	0	0	0	0	NC†
2023	ADAC GT4 Germany	PROsport Racing	12	4	1	0	7	199	**1st**
2023	GT Winter Series	PROsport Racing	?	?	?	?	?	31.84	30th
2023	24 Hours of Nürburgring - SP9	PROsport Racing	1	0	0	0	0	N/A	14th
2024	ADAC GT Masters	Walkenhorst Motorsport	12	0	0	0	2	117	8th
2024	Nürburgring Langstrecken-Serie - SP9	Walkenhorst Motorsport	2	0	0	0	0	*	*
2024	24 Hours of Nürburgring - SP9	Walkenhorst Motorsport	1	0	0	0	0	N/A	19th
2025	GT4 America Series - Silver	JMF Motorsports	13	2	0	0	8	206	**3rd**
2026	Michelin Pilot Challenge - GS	Heart of Racing Team	1	0	0	0	0	200	59th

† As Ortmann was a guest driver, he was ineligible to score points.

=== Complete ADAC Formula 4 Championship results ===
(key) (Races in bold indicate pole position) (Races in italics indicate fastest lap)

Year	Team	1	2	3	4	5	6	7	8	9	10	11	12	13	14	15	16	17	18	19	20	21	22	23	24	DC	Points
2015	ADAC Berlin-Brandenburg	OSC1; 1; 14	OSC1; 2; 14	OSC1; 3; 13	RBR; 1; 13	RBR; 2; 13	RBR; 3; 7	SPA; 1 Ret	SPA; 2; 25	SPA; 3; 17	LAU; 1; 4	LAU; 2; 5	LAU; 3; 5	NÜR; 1; 30	NÜR; 2; 11	NÜR; 3; 15	SAC; 1; 8	SAC; 2; 13	SAC; 3; 4	OSC2; 1; 14	OSC2; 2; 6	OSC2; 3; 7	HOC; 1; 5	HOC; 2; 14	HOC; 3 Ret	12th	78
2016	ADAC Berlin-Brandenburg	OSC1; 1 Ret	OSC1; 2; 3	OSC1; 3; 16	SAC; 1; 1	SAC; 2; 1	SAC; 3; 7	LAU; 1; 9	LAU; 2; 4	LAU; 3; 3	OSC2; 1; 6	OSC2; 2; 3	OSC2; 3 Ret	RBR; 1; 7	RBR; 2; 2	RBR; 3; 5	NÜR; 1; 3	NÜR; 2 Ret	NÜR; 3; 6	ZAN; 1; 2	**ZAN**; **2**; 1	ZAN; 3; 11	**HOC**; **1**; 2	HOC; 2; 22	HOC; 3; 7	3rd	247

=== Complete Italian Formula 4 Championship results ===
(key) (Races in bold indicate pole position) (Races in italics indicate fastest lap)

Year	Team	1	2	3	4	5	6	7	8	9	10	11	12	13	14	15	16	17	18	19	20	21	DC	Points
2015	Kfzteile24 Mücke Motorsport	VAL; 1	VAL; 2	VAL; 3	MNZ; 1; 7	MNZ; 2; 21	MNZ; 3; 14	IMO1; 1 Ret	IMO1; 2 Ret	IMO1; 3; 5	MUG; 1	MUG; 2	MUG; 3	ADR; 1	ADR; 2	ADR; 3	IMO2; 1	IMO2; 2	IMO2; 3	MIS; 1	MIS; 2	MIS; 3	20th	16

=== Complete ADAC GT Masters results ===
(key) (Races in bold indicate pole position) (Races in italics indicate fastest lap)

Year	Team	Car	1	2	3	4	5	6	7	8	9	10	11	12	13	14	Pos.	Points
2017	BWT Mücke Motorsport	Audi R8 LMS	OSC; 1; 12	OSC; 2 Ret	LAU; 1; 10	LAU; 2; 14	RBR; 1; 24	RBR; 2; 10	ZAN; 1; 14	ZAN; 2; 8	NÜR; 1; 13	NÜR; 2; 12	SAC; 1; 19	SAC; 2; 7	HOC; 1; 14	HOC; 2; 5	26th	22
2018	BWT Mücke Motorsport	Audi R8 LMS	OSC; 1; 14	OSC; 2; 14	MST; 1; 11	MST; 2; 11	RBR; 1 Ret	RBR; 2; 17	NÜR; 1; 14	NÜR; 2; 3	ZAN; 1; 4	ZAN; 2; 7	SAC; 1; 6	SAC; 2 Ret	HOC; 1 Ret	HOC; 2; 10	14th	42
2019	BWT Mücke Motorsport	Audi R8 LMS Evo	OSC; 1; 12	OSC; 2; 10	MST; 1; 8	MST; 2; 5	RBR; 1; 22	RBR; 2; 15	ZAN; 1; 4	ZAN; 2; 8	NÜR; 1; 19	NÜR; 2; 10	HOC; 1; 13	HOC; 2; 16	SAC; 1; 6	SAC; 2; 9	12th	80
2020	EFP Car Collection by TECE	Audi R8 LMS Evo	LAU; 1	LAU; 2	NÜR; 1; 28	NÜR; 2; 27											NC	0
2020	BWT Mücke Motorsport	Audi R8 LMS Evo					HOC; 1	HOC; 2	SAC; 1; 19	SAC; 2; 18	RBR; 1	RBR; 2	LAU; 1	LAU; 2	OSC; 1	OSC; 2	NC	0
2021	GRT Grasser Racing Team	Lamborghini Huracán GT3 Evo	OSC; 1; 25	OSC; 2; 16	RBR; 1; 17	RBR; 2; 11	ZAN; 1; 18	ZAN; 2; 14	LAU; 1; 5	LAU; 2; 14	SAC; 1; 15	SAC; 2; 13	HOC; 1; 13	HOC; 2; 13	NÜR; 1; 16	NÜR; 2; 14	24th	31
2024	Walkenhorst Motorsport	Aston Martin Vantage AMR GT3 Evo	OSC; 1; 9	OSC; 2; 7	ZAN; 1; 3	ZAN; 2; 5^{3}	NÜR; 1; 9	NÜR; 2; 9	SPA; 1; 3	SPA; 2; 5^{3}	RBR; 1; 16	RBR; 2; 7	HOC; 1; 10	HOC; 2; 9			8th	117

=== Complete ADAC GT4 Germany results ===
(key) (Races in bold indicate pole position) (Races in italics indicate fastest lap)

Year	Team	Car	1	2	3	4	5	6	7	8	9	10	11	12	Pos.	Points
2021	PROsport Racing	Aston Martin Vantage AMR GT4	OSC1; 1	OSC1; 2	RBR; 1	RBR; 2	ZAN; 1	ZAN; 2	**SAC**; **1**; 1	SAC; 2; 7	HOC; 1 Ret	HOC; 2; 9	NÜR; 1; 1	NÜR; 2; 1	NC†	0
2022	PROsport Racing	Aston Martin Vantage AMR GT4	OSC1; 1; 5	OSC1; 2; 4	RBR; 1; 10	RBR; 2 Ret	**ZAN**; **1**; 1	**ZAN**; **2**; 1	NÜR; 1; 4	NÜR; 2; 5	**SAC**; **1**; 1	SAC; 2; 1	**HOC**; **1**; 5	**HOC**; **2**; 2	1st	185
2023	PROsport Racing	Aston Martin Vantage AMR GT4	OSC1; 1 Ret	OSC1; 2; 1	ZAN; 1; 4	ZAN; 2; 5	**NÜR**; **1**; 2	NÜR; 2; 1	LAU; 1; 4	LAU; 2; 3	SAC; 1; 1	SAC; 2; 1	**HOC**; **1**; 6	HOC; 2; 3	1st	199

^{†} As Ortmann was a guest driver, he was ineligible for points.
