= Jannes Fittje =

German racing driver

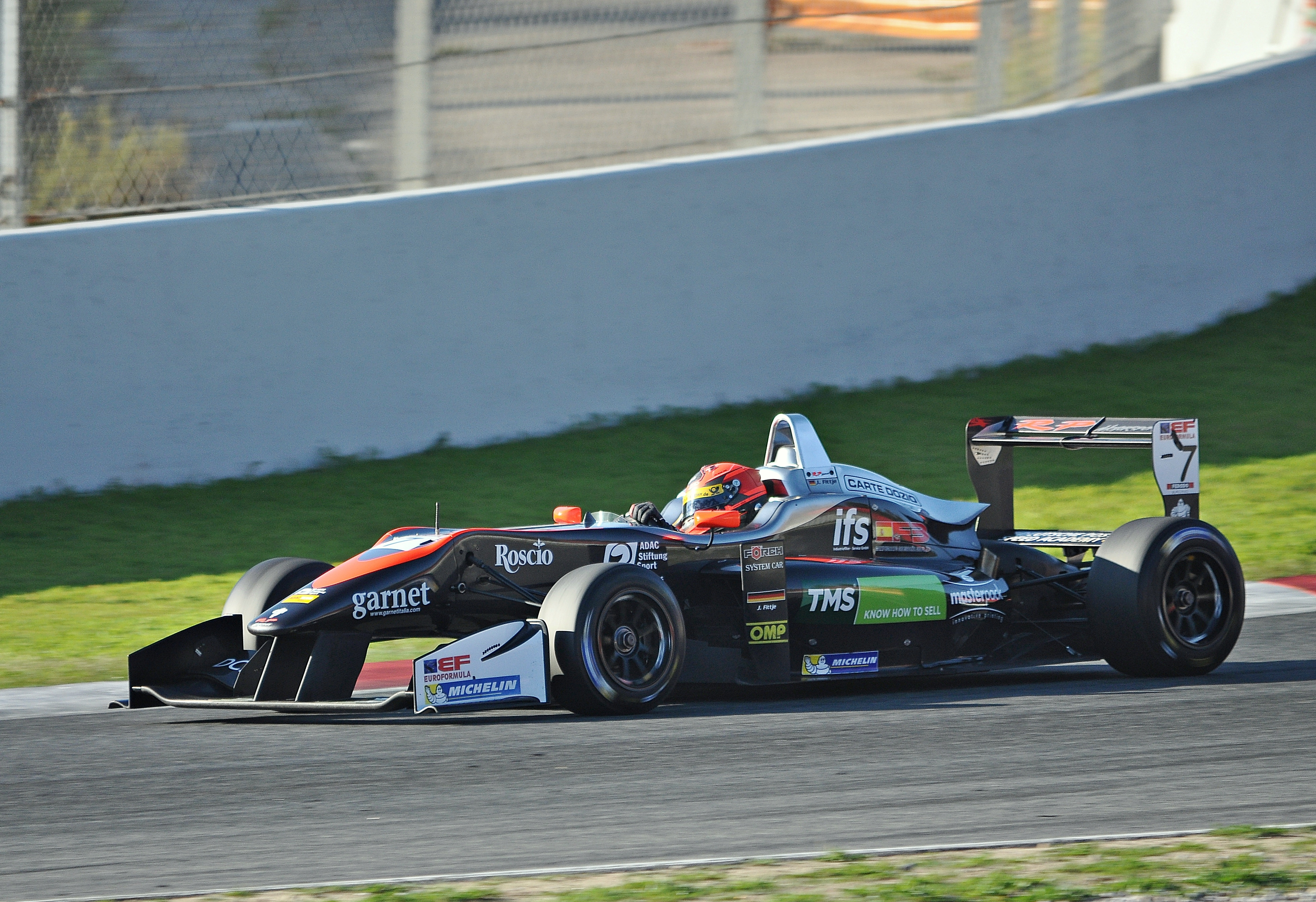
- Fittje at the Circuit de Barcelona-Catalunya in 2017
- Nationality: (Germany) German
- Born: 22 July 1999 (age 27) Waltershausen, Germany

Porsche Mobil 1 Supercup career
- Debut season: 2019
- Current team: Team Project 1 - Fach
- Categorisation: FIA Silver
- Car number: 24
- Starts: 1
- Wins: 0
- Poles: 0
- Fastest laps: 0
- Best finish: 24th in 2019

Previous series
- 2018-2017 2018 2016-2015: Euroformula Open Championship; GP3 Series; ADAC Formula 4 Championship

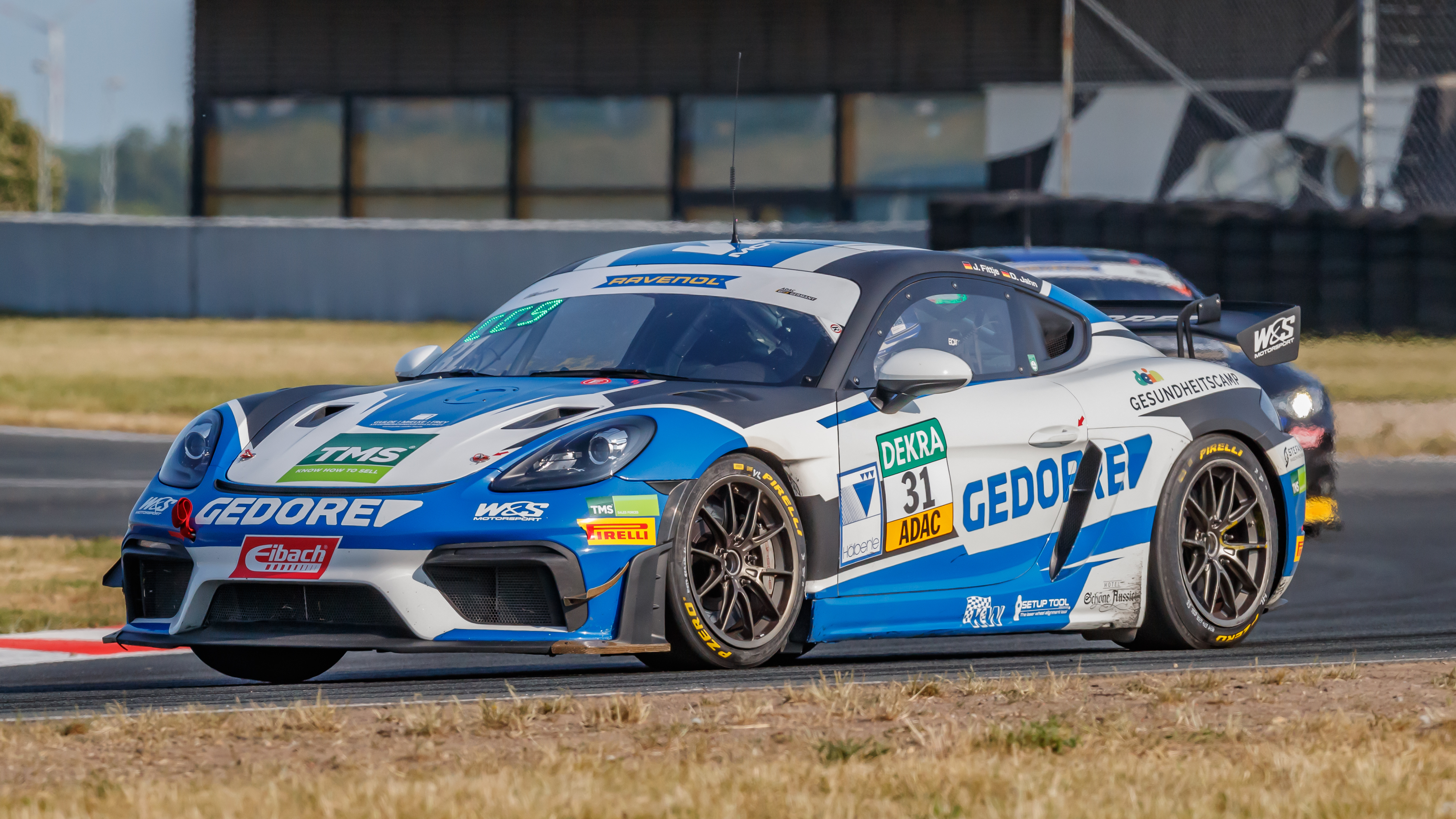
Fittje and David Jahn competing in the 2023 ADAC GT4 Germany season.

Jannes Fittje (born 22 July 1999) is a German racing driver from Waltershausen. He is currently competing in ADAC GT4 Germany for W&S Motorsport.

== Career ==
=== ADAC Formula 4 Championship ===
In 2015, Fittje made his single-seater debut in the ADAC F4 championship with Team Motopark. He finished the season 18th with 22 points. In 2016, Fittje got on the podium for the first time in his single seater career where he finished third at Oschersleben. He had two more podiums that season, finishing the season seventh with 133 points.

=== GP3 ===
In 2018, Fittje replaced David Beckmann at Jenzer for the final five races of the GP3 Season. Fittje finished the season with no points and his highest finished was tenth at Sochi.

=== Porsche Supercup ===
Fittje competed one race in the 2019 Porsche Mobil 1 Supercup for Team Project 1 - Fach in Spain where he recorded one point by finishing 16th.

=== GT World Challenge ===
For the 2022 season, Fittje joined Haupt Racing Team to compete in the Silver Cup of the GT World Challenge Europe Endurance Cup alongside Jordan Love and Alain Valente. The team failed to score any points in the main championship whilst taking tenth place in the category standings.

During 2023, Fittje teamed up with Antares Au, Matteo Cairoli and Tim Heinemann in the Bronze Cup for the 24 Hours of Spa. This would prove to be a resounding success as Fittje, having seen Cairoli take overall pole position, helped his outfit to a class victory, which he later called "the biggest and best result" of his career.

== Racing record ==
=== Career summary ===
| Season | Series | Team | Races | Wins | Poles | F/Laps | Podiums | Points | Position |
|---|---|---|---|---|---|---|---|---|---|
| 2015 | ADAC Formula 4 Championship | Team Motopark | 24 | 0 | 0 | 0 | 0 | 22 | 18th |
| 2016 | ADAC Formula 4 Championship | US Racing | 24 | 0 | 0 | 1 | 3 | 133 | 7th |
| 2017 | Euroformula Open Championship | Fortec Motorsport | 10 | 0 | 0 | 0 | 2 | 159 | 5th |
| 2017 | Euroformula Open Championship | RP Motorsport | 6 | 0 | 0 | 0 | 2 | 159 | 5th |
| 2018 | GP3 Series | Jenzer Motorsport | 10 | 0 | 0 | 0 | 0 | 0 | 20th |
| 2018 | Euroformula Open Championship | Drivex School | 6 | 0 | 0 | 0 | 0 | 22 | 12th |
| 2019 | Porsche Carrera Cup Germany | Team Project 1 - JBR | 14 | 0 | 0 | 0 | 0 | 30 | 18th |
| 2019 | Porsche Supercup | Team Project 1 - Fach | 1 | 0 | 0 | 0 | 0 | 1 | 25th |
| 2020 | ADAC GT Masters | KÜS Team75 Bernhard | 14 | 0 | 0 | 0 | 1 | 58 | 17th |
| 2021 | ADAC GT Masters | KÜS Team Bernhard | 6 | 0 | 0 | 0 | 0 | 37 | 21st |
| 2021 | ADAC GT Masters | Team Joos Sportwagentechnik | 8 | 0 | 0 | 0 | 0 | 37 | 21st |
| 2022 | ADAC GT Masters | Madpanda Motorsport | 4 | 0 | 0 | 0 | 0 | 15 | 31st |
| 2022 | ADAC GT Masters | ID-Racing | 2 | 0 | 0 | 0 | 0 | 15 | 31st |
| 2022 | GT World Challenge Europe Endurance Cup | Haupt Racing Team | 5 | 0 | 0 | 0 | 0 | 0 | NC |
| 2022 | GT World Challenge Europe Endurance Cup - Silver Cup | Haupt Racing Team | 5 | 0 | 0 | 0 | 0 | 31 | 10th |
| 2022 | 24H GT Series - GT3 | Team Joos Sportwagentechnik | 1 | 0 | 0 | 0 | 0 | 0 | NC† |
| 2023 | ADAC GT Masters | Huber Motorsport | 12 | 1 | 1 | 0 | 5 | 165 | **3rd** |
| 2023 | GT World Challenge Europe Endurance Cup | Huber Motorsport | 1 | 0 | 1 | 1 | 0 | 0 | NC |
| 2023 | GT World Challenge Europe Endurance Cup - Bronze Cup | Huber Motorsport | 1 | 1 | 1 | 1 | 1 | 36 | 9th |
| 2023 | ADAC GT4 Germany | AVIA W&S Motorsport | 12 | 2 | 3 | 1 | 5 | 148 | **3rd** |
| 2023-24 | Asian Le Mans Series - GT | Huber Motorsport | 2 | 0 | 0 | 0 | 0 | 0 | 35th |
| 2024 | ADAC GT Masters | Haupt Racing Team | 12 | 1 | 0 | 0 | 3 | 151 | 4th |
| 2025 | ADAC GT Masters | SR Motorsport by Schnitzelalm | 12 | 0 | 1 | 2 | 2 | 111 | 10th |
| 2025 | Nürburgring Langstrecken-Serie - SP9 | SR Motorsport by Schnitzelalm | | | | | | | |
| 2026 | Nürburgring Langstrecken-Serie - SP9 | Schnitzelalm Racing | | | | | | | |
| 2026 | Nürburgring Langstrecken-Serie - Cup3 | SEEBACH Motorsport | | | | | | | |

^{*} Season still in progress.

=== Complete ADAC Formula 4 Championship results ===
(key) (Races in bold indicate pole position) (Races in italics indicate fastest lap)

| Year | Team | 1 | 2 | 3 | 4 | 5 | 6 | 7 | 8 | 9 | 10 | 11 | 12 | 13 | 14 | 15 | 16 | 17 | 18 | 19 | 20 | 21 | 22 | 23 | 24 | DC | Points |
|---|---|---|---|---|---|---|---|---|---|---|---|---|---|---|---|---|---|---|---|---|---|---|---|---|---|---|---|
| 2015 | Motopark | OSC1; 1; 17 | OSC1; 2; 15 | OSC1; 3; 17 | RBR; 1 Ret | RBR; 2; 12 | RBR; 3; 18 | SPA; 1; 21 | SPA; 2; 12 | SPA; 3; 15 | LAU; 1; 6 | LAU; 2; 10 | LAU; 3; 6 | NÜR; 1; 18 | NÜR; 2; 16 | NÜR; 3; 16 | SAC; 1; 12 | SAC; 2; 12 | SAC; 3; 12 | OSC2; 1; 10 | OSC2; 2; 8 | OSC2; 3; 29 | HOC; 1; 24 | HOC; 2; 16 | HOC; 3; 27 | 18th | 22 |
| 2016 | US Racing | OSC1; 1; 3 | OSC1; 2; 5 | OSC1; 3; 7 | SAC; 1; 5 | SAC; 2; 4 | SAC; 3 Ret | LAU; 1; 4 | LAU; 2; 3 | LAU; 3; 2 | OSC2; 1; 11 | OSC2; 2; 7 | OSC2; 3; 20 | RBR; 1 Ret | RBR; 2; 6 | RBR; 3; 20 | NÜR; 1; 10 | NÜR; 2; 13 | NÜR; 3; 4 | ZAN; 1; 15 | ZAN; 2; 17 | ZAN; 3; 14 | HOC; 1; 12 | HOC; 2; 7 | HOC; 3; 13 | 7th | 133 |

=== Complete GP3 Series results ===
(key)

| Year | Entrant | 1 | 2 | 3 | 4 | 5 | 6 | 7 | 8 | 9 | 10 | 11 | 12 | 13 | 14 | 15 | 16 | 17 | 18 | Pos | Points |
|---|---|---|---|---|---|---|---|---|---|---|---|---|---|---|---|---|---|---|---|---|---|
| 2018 | Jenzer Motorsport | CAT; FEA | CAT; SPR | LEC; FEA | LEC; SPR | RBR; FEA | RBR; SPR | SIL; FEA | SIL; SPR | HUN; FEA; 13 | HUN; SPR; 17 | SPA; FEA; 20 | SPA; SPR; 15 | MNZ; FEA; 16 | MNZ; SPR; 11 | SOC; FEA; 12 | SOC; SPR; 10 | YMC; FEA; 13 | YMC; SPR; Ret | 20th | 0 |

=== Complete Porsche Carrera Cup Germany results ===
(key) (Races in bold indicate pole position) (Races in italics indicate fastest lap)

| Year | Team | 1 | 2 | 3 | 4 | 5 | 6 | 7 | 8 | 9 | 10 | 11 | 12 | 13 | 14 | 15 | 16 | DC | Points |
|---|---|---|---|---|---|---|---|---|---|---|---|---|---|---|---|---|---|---|---|
| 2019 | Team Project 1 - JBR | HOC1; 1 DNS | HOC1; 2 Ret | MOS; 1; 9 | MOS; 2 Ret | RBR; 1; 17 | RBR; 2; 26 | NOR; 1; 14 | NOR; 2; 14 | ZAN; 1; 11 | ZAN; 2; 14 | NÜR; 1; 14 | NÜR; 2; 15 | HOC2; 1 Ret | HOC2; 2 DNS | SAC; 1; 10 | SAC; 2; 12 | 18th | 30 |

=== Complete ADAC GT Masters results ===
(key) (Races in bold indicate pole position) (Races in italics indicate fastest lap)

| Year | Team | Car | 1 | 2 | 3 | 4 | 5 | 6 | 7 | 8 | 9 | 10 | 11 | 12 | 13 | 14 | DC | Points |
|---|---|---|---|---|---|---|---|---|---|---|---|---|---|---|---|---|---|---|
| 2020 | KÜS Team75 Bernhard | Porsche 911 GT3 R | LAU1; 1; 4 | LAU1; 2; 11 | NÜR; 1; 14 | NÜR; 2; 18 | HOC; 1; 12 | HOC; 2; 11 | SAC; 1; 31† | SAC; 2; 14 | RBR; 1; 16 | RBR; 2; 12 | LAU2; 1; 4 | LAU2; 2 Ret | OSC; 1; 14 | OSC; 2; 8 | 17th | 58 |
| 2021 | KÜS Team Bernhard | Porsche 911 GT3 R | OSC; 1; 12 | OSC; 2; 14 | RBR; 1 Ret | RBR; 2 Ret | ZAN; 1; 14 | ZAN; 2; 12 | | | | | | | | | 21st | 37 |
| 2021 | Team Joos Sportwagentechnik | Porsche 911 GT3 R | | | | | | | LAU; 1; 6 | LAU; 2; 17 | SAC; 1 Ret | SAC; 2 Ret | HOC; 1; 7 | HOC; 2; 10 | NÜR; 1; 17 | NÜR; 2 Ret | 21st | 37 |
| 2022 | Madpanda Motorsport | Mercedes-AMG GT3 Evo | OSC; 1; 19 | OSC; 2; 20 | RBR; 1; 19 | RBR; 2; 20 | | | | | | | | | | | 31st | 15 |
| 2022 | ID-Racing | Porsche 911 GT3 R | | | | | ZAN; 1; 5^{3} | ZAN; 2; 13 | NÜR; 1 | NÜR; 2 | LAU; 1 | LAU; 2 | SAC; 1 | SAC; 2 | HOC; 1 | HOC; 2 | 31st | 15 |
| 2023 | Huber Motorsport | Porsche 911 GT3 R (992) | HOC1; 1; 3 | HOC1; 2; 6 | NOR; 1; 2^{2} | **NOR**; **2**; 1^{1} | NÜR; 1; 9 | NÜR; 2; 11 | SAC; 1; 8^{3}† | SAC; 2; 7 | RBR; 1; 3 | RBR; 2; 4 | HOC2; 1; 3^{3} | HOC2; 2; 4 | | | 3rd | 165 |
| 2024 | Haupt Racing Team | Mercedes-AMG GT3 Evo | OSC; 1; 4 | OSC; 2; 2^{3} | ZAN; 1; 4 | ZAN; 2; 6 | NÜR; 1 Ret^{3} | NÜR; 2; 2^{2} | SPA; 1; 10 | SPA; 2; 8 | RBR; 1; 1^{2} | RBR; 2; 10 | HOC; 1; 7 | HOC; 2; 6 | | | 4th | 151 |
| 2025 | SR Motorsport by Schnitzelalm | Mercedes-AMG GT3 Evo | LAU; 1; 8 | LAU; 2; 3^{3} | **ZAN**; **1**; 14^{1} | ZAN; 2; 7 | NÜR; 1; 10 | NÜR; 2; 8 | SAL; 1; 2 | SAL; 2; 14 | RBR; 1 Ret | RBR; 2; 10 | HOC; 1; 4 | HOC; 2; 7 | | | 10th | 111 |

^{*} Season still in progress.

=== Complete GT World Challenge Europe Endurance Cup results ===
| Year | Team | Car | Class | 1 | 2 | 3 | 4 | 5 | 6 | 7 | Pos. | Points |
|---|---|---|---|---|---|---|---|---|---|---|---|---|
| 2022 | Haupt Racing Team | Mercedes-AMG GT3 Evo | Silver | IMO; 37 | LEC; 16 | SPA; 6H; 20 | SPA; 12H; 12 | SPA; 24H; Ret | HOC; Ret | CAT; 25 | 10th | 31 |
| 2023 | Huber Motorsport | Porsche 911 GT3 R (992) | Bronze | MNZ | LEC | SPA; 6H; 27 | SPA; 12H; 27 | **SPA**; **24H**; 13 | NÜR | CAT | 9th | 36 |

^{*}Season still in progress.
