= Kim-Luis Schramm =

German racing driver (born 1997)

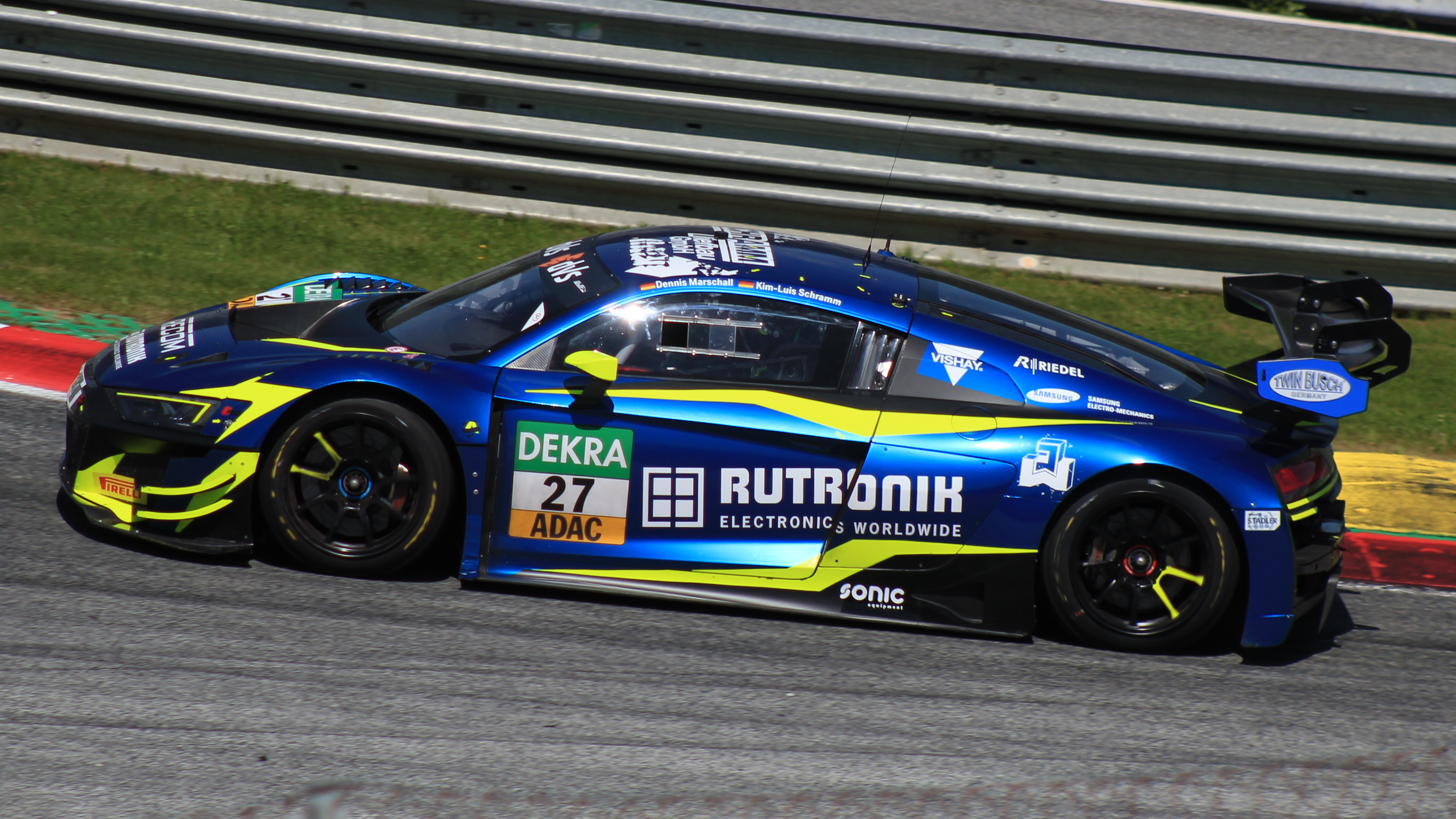
- Schramm in 2022
- Nationality: (Germany) German
- Born: 21 July 1997 (age 29) Wümbach, Germany

ADAC GT Masters career
- Debut season: 2018
- Current team: Mercedes-AMG Team zvo
- Categorisation: FIA Silver
- Starts: 56 (56 entries)
- Wins: 0
- Podiums: 4
- Poles: 0
- Fastest laps: 0
- Best finish: 6th in 2022

Previous series
- 2018–19 2015–17 2013–14: Blancpain GT Series Endurance; ADAC Formula 4 ADAC Formel Masters

Kim-Luis Schramm (born 21 July 1997) is a German racing driver who last competed in the ADAC GT Masters. He is a two-time class winner of the Nürburgring 24 Hours.

== Racing record ==
=== Racing career summary ===
Season	Series	Team	Races	Wins	Poles	F/Laps	Podiums	Points	Position
2013	ADAC Formel Masters	ADAC Berlin-Brandenburg e.V.	22	0	0	0	1	24	14th
2014	ADAC Formel Masters	ADAC Berlin-Brandenburg	24	0	0	1	2	127	9th
2015	ADAC Formula 4 Championship	Neuhauser Racing	24	0	0	0	1	70	13th
2016	ADAC Formula 4 Championship	US Racing	24	1	1	4	5	176	5th
2016–17	MRF Challenge Formula 2000 Championship	MRF Racing	12	0	0	0	0	65	8th
2017	ADAC Formula 4 Championship	US Racing	21	0	1	1	1	95	8th
2017	24 Hours of Nürburgring - Cup 3	Teichmann Racing	1	1	?	?	1	N/A	**1st**
2018	ADAC GT Masters	Team Zakspeed BKK Mobil Oil Racing	14	0	0	0	1	26	21st
2018	24 Hours of Nürburgring - SP10	Black Falcon Team Identica	1	1	0	0	1	N/A	**1st**
2018	Blancpain GT Series Endurance Cup	Attempto Racing	3	0	0	0	0	0	NC
2018	VLN Series - SP9 Pro	Car Collection Motorsport	2	0	0	0	0	0	NC†
2019	Blancpain GT Series Endurance Cup	Phoenix Racing	5	0	0	0	0	0	NC
2019	Blancpain GT Series Endurance Cup - Silver	Phoenix Racing	5	0	0	0	1	42	9th
2019	24H GT Series - European Championship - A6	Phoenix Racing	1	0	0	0	1	17	19th
2019	24 Hours of Nürburgring - SP9	Phoenix Racing	1	0	0	0	0	N/A	7th
2019	DMV Gran Turismo Touring Car Cup - Class 1	Phoenix Racing	1	0	0	0	1	0	NC†
2019	DMV Dunlop 60 - Class 1	Phoenix Racing	1	1	0	0	1	9.29	18th
2019	VLN Series - SP9 Pro-Am	Phoenix Racing	3	1	0	0	2	15.33	12th
2020	ADAC GT Masters	Montaplast by Land-Motorsport	14	0	0	0	0	29	26th
2020	GT World Challenge Europe Endurance Cup	Audi Sport Team Attempto	3	0	1	1	0	3	31st
2020	24 Hours of Nürburgring - SP9	Phoenix Racing	1	0	0	0	0	N/A	DNF
2021	ADAC GT Masters	Rutronik Racing by TECE	14	0	0	0	1	85	11th
2021	GT World Challenge Europe Endurance Cup	Attempto Racing	2	0	0	0	0	0	NC
2021	Nürburgring Endurance Series	Phoenix Racing	1	0	0	0	0	0	NC
2021	24 Hours of Nürburgring - SP9	Phoenix Racing	1	0	0	0	0	N/A	16th
2022	ADAC GT Masters	Rutronik Racing	14	0	0	0	2	120	6th
2022	GT World Challenge Europe Endurance Cup	Attempto Racing	2	0	0	0	1	18	21st
2022	Nürburgring Endurance Series	Scherer Sport Team Phoenix	1	0	0	0	0	0	NC†
2022	24 Hours of Nürburgring - SP9	Scherer Sport Team Phoenix	1	0	0	0	0	N/A	5th
2023	ADAC GT Masters	FK Performance Motorsport	6	0	0	0	0	53	11th
2023	Nürburgring Endurance Series - SP9 Pro	Scherer Sport PHX	2	0	0	0	1	12	**3rd**
2023	24 Hours of Nürburgring - SP9	Scherer Sport PHX	1	0	0	0	0	N/A	11th

^{†} As Schramm was a guest driver, he was ineligible to score points.* Season still in progress.

=== Complete ADAC Formel Masters/Formula 4 Championship results ===
(key) (Races in bold indicate pole position) (Races in italics indicate fastest lap)

Year	Team	1	2	3	4	5	6	7	8	9	10	11	12	13	14	15	16	17	18	19	20	21	22	23	24	DC	Points
2013	ADAC Berlin-Brandenburg e.V.	OSC; 1 DNS	OSC; 2; 12	OSC; 3; 11	SPA; 1; 13	SPA; 2 DNS	SPA; 3; 11	SAC; 1; 13	SAC; 2; 9	SAC; 3; 10	NÜR; 1; 13	NÜR; 2; 11	NÜR; 3 Ret	RBR; 1; 8	RBR; 2; 7	RBR; 3; 2	LAU; 1; 14	LAU; 2; 11	LAU; 3; 11	SVK; 1; 10	SVK; 2 Ret	SVK; 3; 11	HOC; 1; 13	HOC; 2 Ret	HOC; 3; 12	14th	24
2014	ADAC Berlin-Brandenburg	OSC; 1 Ret	OSC; 2; 4	OSC; 3; 4	ZAN; 1; 3	ZAN; 2; 7	ZAN; 3; 3	LAU; 1; 4	LAU; 2; 4	LAU; 3; 8	RBR; 1; 9	RBR; 2; 6	RBR; 3; 6	SVK; 1 Ret	SVK; 2; 8	SVK; 3; 5	NÜR; 1; 8	NÜR; 2; 9	NÜR; 3; 7	SAC; 1; 7	SAC; 2 Ret	SAC; 3 Ret	HOC; 1; 14	HOC; 2; 8	HOC; 3; 4	9th	127
2015	Neuhauser Racing	OSC1; 1 Ret	OSC1; 2; 33	OSC1; 3; 10	RBR; 1; 15	RBR; 2; 8	RBR; 3; 6	SPA; 1; 14	SPA; 2; 18	SPA; 3; 5	LAU; 1; 7	LAU; 2; 9	LAU; 3; 17	NÜR; 1; 17	NÜR; 2; 29	NÜR; 3; 13	SAC; 1; 9	SAC; 2; 4	SAC; 3; 3	OSC2; 1 Ret	OSC2; 2 Ret	OSC2; 3; 20	HOC; 1; 14	HOC; 2 Ret	HOC; 3; 5	13th	70
2016	US Racing	OSC1; 1; 2	OSC1; 2; 2	OSC1; 3; 6	**SAC**; **1**; 3	SAC; 2 Ret	SAC; 3; 5	LAU; 1; 8	LAU; 2; 5	LAU; 3; 4	OSC2; 1; 10	OSC2; 2; 8	OSC2; 3; 1	RBR; 1; 3	RBR; 2; 5	RBR; 3 Ret	NÜR; 1; 13	NÜR; 2; 8	NÜR; 3; 8	ZAN; 1; 11	ZAN; 2 Ret	ZAN; 3; 5	HOC; 1; 10	HOC; 2; 31	HOC; 3; 4	5th	176
2017	US Racing	OSC1; 1; 11	OSC1; 2; 22	OSC1; 3; 6	**LAU**; **1** DSQ	LAU; 2 DSQ	LAU; 3 DSQ	RBR; 1; 8	RBR; 2; 14	RBR; 3; 7	OSC2; 1; 7	OSC2; 2; 9	OSC2; 3; 4	NÜR; 1; 2	NÜR; 2; 6	NÜR; 3; 5	SAC; 1; 9	SAC; 2 Ret	SAC; 3; 14	HOC; 1; 7	HOC; 2; 4	HOC; 3; 9				8th	95

=== Complete ADAC GT Masters results ===
(key) (Races in bold indicate pole position) (Races in italics indicate fastest lap)

Year	Team	Car	1	2	3	4	5	6	7	8	9	10	11	12	13	14	DC	Points
2018	Team Zakspeed BKK Mobil Oil Racing	Mercedes-AMG GT3	OSC; 1; 21	OSC; 2; 31	MST; 1; 14	MST; 2; 26	RBR; 1; 22	RBR; 2; 23	NÜR; 1; 22	NÜR; 2; 16	ZAN; 1; 25	ZAN; 2; 17	SAC; 1; 2	SAC; 2; 6	HOC; 1; 18	HOC; 2 Ret	21st	26
2020	Montaplast by Land-Motorsport	Audi R8 LMS Evo	LAU1; 1; 26	LAU1; 2; 6	NÜR; 1; 30†	NÜR; 2; 20	HOC; 1; 13	HOC; 2; 10	SAC; 1; 12	SAC; 2 Ret	RBR; 1; 15	RBR; 2 Ret	LAU2; 1 Ret	LAU2; 2; 16	OSC; 1; 11	OSC; 2 Ret	26th	29
2021	Rutronik Racing by TECE	Audi R8 LMS Evo	OSC; 1; 6	OSC; 2 Ret	RBR; 1; 8	**RBR**; **2**; 2^{1}	ZAN; 1; 10	ZAN; 2; 6	LAU; 1; 14	LAU; 2; 8	SAC; 1; 12	SAC; 2; 19	HOC; 1; 14	HOC; 2; 18	NÜR; 1; 8	NÜR; 2; 12	11th	85
2022	Rutronik Racing	Audi R8 LMS Evo II	OSC; 1; 8	OSC; 2; 7	RBR; 1 DSQ	RBR; 2; 6	ZAN; 1; 2	ZAN; 2; 6	NÜR; 1; 13	NÜR; 2; 7	LAU; 1; 9	LAU; 2; 6	SAC; 1; 3^{3}	SAC; 2; 14†^{2}	HOC; 1; 11	HOC; 2; 8	6th	120
2023	FK Performance Motorsport	BMW M4 GT3	HOC; 1; 4	HOC; 2; 8	NOR; 1; 8	NOR; 2; 8	NÜR; 1; 7	NÜR; 2; 9	SAC; 1	SAC; 2	RBR; 1	RBR; 2	HOC; 1	HOC; 2			11th	53
