= 2016 ADAC Formula 4 Championship =

Second season of the ADAC Formula 4

The 2016 ADAC Formula 4 season was the second season of the ADAC Formula 4. It began on 16 April at Oschersleben and finished on 2 October at Hockenheim after seven triple header rounds.

== Teams and drivers ==
Team	No.	Driver	Status	Rounds
(Germany) US Racing	2	(Germany) Jannes Fittje		All
(Germany) US Racing	3	(Germany) Carrie Schreiner		All
(Germany) US Racing	27	(United Kingdom) Louis Gachot		All
(Germany) US Racing	28	(Germany) Kim-Luis Schramm		All
(Germany) ADAC Berlin-Brandenburg	4	(Venezuela) Mauricio Baiz		3
(Germany) ADAC Berlin-Brandenburg	5	(Germany) Lirim Zendeli	R	All
(Germany) ADAC Berlin-Brandenburg	6	(Germany) Mike David Ortmann		All
(Germany) ADAC Berlin-Brandenburg	7	(Sweden) Oliver Söderström		All
(Germany) ADAC Berlin-Brandenburg	9	(Switzerland) Ricardo Feller	R	1–4, 8
(Germany) ADAC Berlin-Brandenburg	97	(Canada) Devlin DeFrancesco		7
(Germany) Liqui Moly Team Engstler	8	(Germany) Luca Engstler		All
(Germany) Liqui Moly Team Engstler	21	(Germany) Michelle Halder		1–2, 5–8
(Denmark) RS Competition	10	(Germany) Andreas Estner	R	1–6, 8
(Denmark) RS Competition	40	(Netherlands) Leonard Hoogenboom	R	1
(Denmark) RS Competition	71	(Germany) Philip Hamprecht		2
(Austria) Lechner Racing	13	(Switzerland) Yannik Brandt	R	All
(Austria) Lechner Racing	14	(Austria) Thomas Preining		All
(Austria) Lechner Racing	15	(Germany) Michael Waldherr		1–5
(Austria) Lechner Racing	55	(Switzerland) Marylin Niederhauser		8
(Germany) Motopark	15	(Germany) Michael Waldherr		8
(Germany) Motopark	22	(Netherlands) Richard Verschoor	R	4, 6
(Germany) Motopark	33	(South Africa) Jonathan Aberdein	R	All
(Germany) Motopark	66	(Finland) Simo Laaksonen		All
(Germany) Motopark	99	(Germany) Sophia Flörsch		All
(Switzerland) Jenzer Motorsport	17	(Argentina) Diego Ciantini		3, 5, 8
(Switzerland) Jenzer Motorsport	18	(Estonia) Jan-Erik Meikup		1–7
(Switzerland) Jenzer Motorsport	19	(Switzerland) Fabio Scherer	R	All
(Switzerland) Jenzer Motorsport	20	(Germany) Kevin Kratz		1–3, 5–8
(Switzerland) Jenzer Motorsport	69	(Switzerland) Giacomo Bianchi		6, 8
(Switzerland) Jenzer Motorsport	77	(Netherlands) Job van Uitert		All
(Germany) Team Timo Scheider	23	(Germany) Julian Hanses	R	All
(Germany) Team Timo Scheider	30	(Norway) Kenneth Gulbrandsen	R	1–3
(Germany) Team Timo Scheider	46	(Brazil) Mauro Auricchio		1–3
(Germany) Team Timo Scheider	75	(Netherlands) Janneau Esmeijer		5–8
(Germany) Robin Brezina	24	(Germany) Robin Brezina		1, 3
(Germany) Rennsport Rössler	24	(Germany) Robin Brezina		8
(Germany) Rennsport Rössler	55	(Switzerland) Marylin Niederhauser		1–4
(Netherlands) Van Amersfoort Racing	25	(Switzerland) Moritz Müller-Crepon		All
(Netherlands) Van Amersfoort Racing	35	(Canada) Kami Moreira-Laliberté		All
(Netherlands) Van Amersfoort Racing	40	(Netherlands) Leonard Hoogenboom	R	2–8
(Netherlands) Van Amersfoort Racing	96	(Australia) Joey Mawson		All
(Italy) Prema Powerteam	29	(Germany) Mick Schumacher		All
(Italy) Prema Powerteam	44	(Estonia) Jüri Vips	R	All
(Italy) Prema Powerteam	68	(United States) Juan Manuel Correa	R	All
(Germany) KUG-Motorsport	45	(Germany) Toni Wolf		All
(Germany) KUG-Motorsport	91	(Venezuela) Sebastián Fernández	R	6
(Germany) SMC Schwärzler Motorsport Concepts	79	(Australia) Jordan Love	R	8
(Austria) Neuhauser Racing	80	(Brazil) Felipe Drugovich	R	All
(Austria) Neuhauser Racing	81	(Denmark) Nicklas Nielsen	R	All
(Germany) Team Piro Sport Interdental	90	(Germany) Cedric Piro		1, 3–8
(Switzerland) RB Racing	91	(Venezuela) Sebastián Fernández	R	5

Icon	Legend
R	Rookie

== Race calendar ==
All rounds were part of the ADAC GT Masters weekends, with the exception of round 4 which supported the TCR International Series.

Round		Circuit	Date	Pole position	Fastest lap	Winning driver	Winning team	Rookie winner
1	R1	(Germany) Motorsport Arena Oschersleben, Oschersleben	16 April	(Australia) Joey Mawson	(Germany) Jannes Fittje	(Australia) Joey Mawson	(Netherlands) Van Amersfoort Racing	(Estonia) Jüri Vips
1	R2	(Germany) Motorsport Arena Oschersleben, Oschersleben	17 April	(Australia) Joey Mawson	(Germany) Kim-Luis Schramm	(Australia) Joey Mawson	(Netherlands) Van Amersfoort Racing	(United States) Juan Manuel Correa
1	R3	(Germany) Motorsport Arena Oschersleben, Oschersleben	17 April		(Australia) Joey Mawson	(Germany) Mick Schumacher	(Italy) Prema Powerteam	(Denmark) Nicklas Nielsen
2	R1	(Germany) Sachsenring, Chemnitz	30 April	(Germany) Kim-Luis Schramm	(Germany) Kim-Luis Schramm	(Germany) Mike David Ortmann	(Germany) ADAC Berlin-Brandenburg	(United States) Juan Manuel Correa
2	R2	(Germany) Sachsenring, Chemnitz	1 May	(Germany) Mick Schumacher	(Germany) Mike David Ortmann	(Germany) Mike David Ortmann	(Germany) ADAC Berlin-Brandenburg	(Denmark) Nicklas Nielsen
2	R3	(Germany) Sachsenring, Chemnitz	1 May		(Denmark) Nicklas Nielsen	(Australia) Joey Mawson	(Netherlands) Van Amersfoort Racing	(Denmark) Nicklas Nielsen
3	R1	(Germany) Lausitzring, Klettwitz	4 June	(Germany) Mick Schumacher	(Germany) Lirim Zendeli	(Germany) Mick Schumacher	(Italy) Prema Powerteam	(Brazil) Felipe Drugovich
3	R2	(Germany) Lausitzring, Klettwitz	4 June	(Germany) Mick Schumacher	(Germany) Kim-Luis Schramm	(Germany) Mick Schumacher	(Italy) Prema Powerteam	(Germany) Lirim Zendeli
3	R3	(Germany) Lausitzring, Klettwitz	5 June		(Canada) Kami Laliberté	(Switzerland) Fabio Scherer	(Switzerland) Jenzer Motorsport	(Switzerland) Fabio Scherer
4	R1	(Germany) Motorsport Arena Oschersleben, Oschersleben	18 June	(Austria) Thomas Preining	(Australia) Joey Mawson	(Australia) Joey Mawson	(Netherlands) Van Amersfoort Racing	(Brazil) Felipe Drugovich
4	R2	(Germany) Motorsport Arena Oschersleben, Oschersleben	19 June	(Australia) Joey Mawson	(Australia) Joey Mawson	(Australia) Joey Mawson	(Netherlands) Van Amersfoort Racing	(Germany) Lirim Zendeli
4	R3	(Germany) Motorsport Arena Oschersleben, Oschersleben	19 June		(Germany) Kim-Luis Schramm	(Germany) Kim-Luis Schramm	(Germany) US Racing	(Netherlands) Leonard Hoogenboom
5	R1	(Austria) Red Bull Ring, Spielberg	23 July	(Austria) Thomas Preining	(Denmark) Nicklas Nielsen	(Austria) Thomas Preining	(Austria) Lechner Racing	(Estonia) Jüri Vips
5	R2	(Austria) Red Bull Ring, Spielberg	24 July	(Australia) Joey Mawson	(United States) Juan Manuel Correa	(Australia) Joey Mawson	(Netherlands) Van Amersfoort Racing	(Denmark) Nicklas Nielsen
5	R3	(Austria) Red Bull Ring, Spielberg	24 July		(Canada) Kami Laliberté	(Finland) Simo Laaksonen	(Germany) Motopark	(Denmark) Nicklas Nielsen
6	R1	(Germany) Nürburgring, Nürburg	6 August	(Germany) Mick Schumacher	(Germany) Mick Schumacher	(Germany) Mick Schumacher	(Italy) Prema Powerteam	(Denmark) Nicklas Nielsen
6	R2	(Germany) Nürburgring, Nürburg	7 August	(Australia) Joey Mawson	(United States) Juan Manuel Correa	(Australia) Joey Mawson	(Netherlands) Van Amersfoort Racing	(Estonia) Jüri Vips
6	R3	(Germany) Nürburgring, Nürburg	7 August		(Germany) Mike David Ortmann	(Austria) Thomas Preining	(Austria) Lechner Racing	(Estonia) Jüri Vips
7	R1	(Netherlands) Circuit Park Zandvoort, Zandvoort	20 August	(Australia) Joey Mawson	(Australia) Joey Mawson	(Australia) Joey Mawson	(Netherlands) Van Amersfoort Racing	(Germany) Lirim Zendeli
7	R2	(Netherlands) Circuit Park Zandvoort, Zandvoort	20 August	(Germany) Mike David Ortmann	(Germany) Lirim Zendeli	(Germany) Mike David Ortmann	(Germany) ADAC Berlin-Brandenburg	(Germany) Lirim Zendeli
7	R3	(Netherlands) Circuit Park Zandvoort, Zandvoort	21 August		(Germany) Sophia Flörsch	(Canada) Kami Laliberté	(Netherlands) Van Amersfoort Racing	(South Africa) Jonathan Aberdein
8	R1	(Germany) Hockenheimring, Hockenheim	1 October	(Germany) Mike David Ortmann	(Australia) Joey Mawson	(Australia) Joey Mawson	(Netherlands) Van Amersfoort Racing	(Estonia) Jüri Vips
8	R2	(Germany) Hockenheimring, Hockenheim	1 October	(Australia) Joey Mawson	(Australia) Joey Mawson	(Australia) Joey Mawson	(Netherlands) Van Amersfoort Racing	(Germany) Lirim Zendeli
8	R3	(Germany) Hockenheimring, Hockenheim	2 October		(Germany) Mick Schumacher	(Germany) Mick Schumacher	(Italy) Prema Powerteam	(Estonia) Jüri Vips

== Championship standings ==
Points were awarded to the top 10 classified finishers in each race. No points were awarded for pole position or fastest lap.

For the third race in Zandvoort, only half points were awarded because of a premature crash.

Position	**1st**	**2nd**	**3rd**	**4th**	**5th**	**6th**	**7th**	**8th**	**9th**	**10th**
Points	25	18	15	12	10	8	6	4	2	1

=== Drivers' Championship ===
Pos	Driver	OSC1 (Germany)			SAC (Germany)			LAU (Germany)			OSC2 (Germany)			RBR (Austria)			NÜR (Germany)			ZAN (Netherlands)			HOC (Germany)			Pts
1	(Australia) Joey Mawson	**1**	**1**	2	2	3	1	6	2	23	1	**1**	Ret	4	**1**	3	2	**1**	28	**1**	27	8	1	**1**	Ret	374
2	(Germany) Mick Schumacher	4	4	1	4	**2**	4	**1**	**1**	6	3	2	26	6	11	2	**1**	15	2	3	3	6	6	8	1	322
3	(Germany) Mike David Ortmann	Ret	3	16	1	1	7	9	4	3	6	3	Ret	7	2	5	3	Ret	6	2	**1**	11	**2**	22	7	247
4	(Austria) Thomas Preining	6	14	3	28	18	13	3	7	8	**2**	DSQ	5	**1**	Ret	16	8	7	1	14	7	10	5	2	5	180.5
5	(Germany) Kim-Luis Schramm	2	2	6	**3**	Ret	5	8	5	4	10	8	1	3	5	Ret	13	8	8	11	Ret	5	10	31	4	176
6	(Estonia) Jüri Vips	9	Ret	25	Ret	8	Ret	7	11	22	26	21	Ret	2	4	6	5	2	3	5	8	9	3	16	3	138
7	(Germany) Jannes Fittje	3	5	7	5	4	Ret	4	3	2	11	7	20	Ret	6	20	10	13	4	15	17	14	12	7	13	133
8	(Denmark) Nicklas Nielsen	10	9	8	7	5	3	Ret	15	17	Ret	15	25	5	3	4	4	3	17	16	11	15	16	27	8	106
9	(Canada) Kami Moreira-Laliberté	24	8	Ret	9	6	21	2	28	24	Ret	22	19	28	19	26	15	Ret	10	8	6	1	8	3	2	94.5
10	(United States) Juan Manuel Correa	Ret	6	20	6	9	6	12	9	11	5	9	3	Ret	18	11	6	4	30	6	9	4	Ret	Ret	30	91
11	(Finland) Simo Laaksonen	Ret	7	22	8	12	2	Ret	16	14	7	4	Ret	10	17	1	9	Ret	12	Ret	12	30	9	4	34	88
12	(Brazil) Felipe Drugovich	12	10	9	17	10	28	5	8	7	4	6	Ret	8	Ret	28	Ret	6	18	9	4	3	26	9	14	79.5
13	(Germany) Lirim Zendeli	Ret	16	Ret	18	11	11	21	6	5	25	5	13	27	10	14	Ret	12	31	4	2	7	4	5	24	74
14	(South Africa) Jonathan Aberdein	15	24	11	10	Ret	8	Ret	13	13	8	13	4	26	9	21	14	9	15	7	10	2	23	6	27	49
15	(Netherlands) Richard Verschoor										12	24	6				7	5	5							34
16	(Germany) Michael Waldherr	7	12	4	13	28	9	16	Ret	19	Ret	Ret	21	9	16	7							Ret	29	16	28
17	(Switzerland) Fabio Scherer	14	17	18	21	15	22	14	10	1	Ret	16	14	Ret	20	15	21	16	16	17	16	16	24	Ret	33	26
18	(Netherlands) Leonard Hoogenboom	13	23	13	25	21	25	10	14	12	9	12	2	11	24	8	16	17	11	25	28	23	27	17	15	25
19	(Germany) Sophia Flörsch	8	Ret	5	14	7	10	13	20	27	14	20	10	16	27	10	12	14	9	Ret	Ret	29	28	12	18	25
20	(Netherlands) Job van Uitert	DSQ	13	31	20	Ret	29	Ret	12	9	13	10	9	31	23	17	30	19	23	13	Ret	13	7	14	6	19
21	(Netherlands) Janneau Esmeijer													30	7	19	18	18	29	10	5	32	20	19	12	17
22	(Switzerland) Moritz Müller-Crepon	5	Ret	15	16	Ret	26	23	Ret	Ret	Ret	11	18	20	13	30	11	29	7	20	13	17	17	32	20	16
23	(Estonia) Jan-Erik Meikup	21	22	27	15	17	30	Ret	27	21	18	14	7	25	31	27	26	Ret	24	28	24	28				6
24	(Germany) Cedric Piro	17	11	12				11	Ret	16	17	17	8	21	21	Ret	29	10	20	21	19	20	11	30	11	5
25	(Venezuela) Sebastián Fernández													12	8	25	17	24	19							4
26	(Germany) Luca Engstler	26	29	17	19	Ret	12	Ret	17	25	21	Ret	11	15	Ret	9	Ret	23	27	18	18	19	14	34	32	2
27	(Germany) Toni Wolf	27	19	14	Ret	14	20	Ret	26	DNQ	Ret	19	15	14	32	13	31	20	Ret	22	21	22	13	11	9	2
28	(Sweden) Oliver Söderström	DNQ	DNQ	DNQ	12	Ret	Ret	Ret	19	Ret	19	23	Ret	18	12	31	Ret	22	22	29	15	27	Ret	10	Ret	1
29	(United Kingdom) Louis Gachot	20	Ret	Ret	23	16	19	Ret	Ret	Ret	Ret	26	16	19	22	12	19	30	14	24	23	21	18	28	10	1
30	(Venezuela) Mauricio Baíz							15	22	10																1
31	(Norway) Kenneth Gulbrandsen	16	20	10	Ret	22	18	DNQ	DNQ	DNQ																1
32	(Switzerland) Yannik Brandt	30	Ret	DNS	27	24	27	Ret	Ret	20	15	18	12	17	14	Ret	20	11	13	23	20	24	Ret	15	22	0
33	(Germany) Kevin Kratz	19	15	Ret	11	13	14	Ret	Ret	Ret				22	15	29	22	21	Ret	19	22	18	Ret	33	31	0
34	(Brazil) Mauro Auricchio	11	18	30	26	20	23	17	21	15																0
35	(Germany) Julian Hanses	29	21	23	29	19	24	Ret	23	Ret	16	27	17	23	26	18	27	26	Ret	12	Ret	12	29	26	21	0
36	(Argentina) Diego Ciantini							20	24	18				13	30	Ret							15	23	28	0
37	(Germany) Robin Brezina	18	25	19				18	25	DNQ													Ret	13	Ret	0
38	(Canada) Devlin DeFrancesco																			30	14	25				0
39	(Switzerland) Ricardo Feller	27	26	26	22	23	15	22	18	26	20	25	Ret										Ret	20	25	0
40	(Germany) Philip Hamprecht				Ret	29	16																			0
41	(Germany) Andreas Estner	22	28	21	24	26	17	19	Ret	DNQ	24	28	22	24	25	22	23	28	21				21	Ret	17	0
42	(Australia) Jordan Love																						Ret	18	23	0
43	(Germany) Carrie Schreiner	23	30	Ret	31	25	31	DNQ	DNQ	DNQ	23	Ret	23	Ret	29	24	24	25	Ret	26	25	26	22	21	19	0
44	(Switzerland) Giacomo Bianchi																25	Ret	25				19	24	29	0
45	(Switzerland) Marylin Niederhauser	DNQ	DNQ	28	30	27	Ret	DNQ	DNQ	Ret	22	29	24										DNQ	DNQ	DNQ	0
46	(Germany) Michelle Halder	25	27	24	DNQ	DNQ	DNQ							29	28	23	28	27	26	27	26	31	25	25	26	0
Pos	Driver	OSC1 (Germany)			SAC (Germany)			LAU (Germany)			OSC2 (Germany)			RBR (Austria)			NÜR (Germany)			ZAN (Netherlands)			HOC (Germany)			Pts

Colour	Result
Gold	Winner
Silver	Second place
Bronze	Third place
Green	Points classification
Blue	Non-points classification
Blue	Non-classified finish (NC)
Purple	Retired, not classified (Ret)
Red	Did not qualify (DNQ)
Red	Did not pre-qualify (DNPQ)
Black	Disqualified (DSQ)
White	Did not start (DNS)
White	Withdrew (WD)
White	Race cancelled (C)
Blank	Did not practice (DNP)
Blank	Did not arrive (DNA)
Blank	Excluded (EX)

**Bold** – Pole
Italics – Fastest Lap

=== Rookies' championship ===
Pos	Driver	OSC1 (Germany)			SAC (Germany)			LAU (Germany)			OSC2 (Germany)			RBR (Austria)			NÜR (Germany)			ZAN (Netherlands)			HOC (Germany)			Pts
1	(Denmark) Nicklas Nielsen	10	9	8	7	5	3	Ret	15	17	Ret	15	25	5	3	4	4	3	17	16	11	15	16	27	8	317
2	(Estonia) Jüri Vips	9	Ret	25	Ret	8	Ret	7	11	22	26	21	Ret	2	4	6	5	2	3	5	8	9	3	16	3	305
3	(United States) Juan Manuel Correa	Ret	6	20	6	9	6	12	9	11	5	9	3	Ret	18	11	6	4	30	6	9	4	Ret	Ret	30	261.5
4	(Brazil) Felipe Drugovich	12	10	9	17	10	28	5	8	7	4	6	Ret	8	Ret	28	Ret	6	18	9	4	3	26	9	14	259
5	(Germany) Lirim Zendeli	Ret	16	Ret	18	11	11	21	6	5	25	5	13	27	10	14	Ret	12	31	4	2	7	4	5	24	255
6	(South Africa) Jonathan Aberdein	15	24	11	10	Ret	8	Ret	13	13	8	13	4	26	9	21	14	9	15	7	10	2	23	6	27	215.5
7	(Netherlands) Leonard Hoogenboom	13	23	13	25	21	25	10	14	12	9	12	2	11	24	8	16	17	11	25	28	23	27	17	15	194
8	(Switzerland) Fabio Scherer	14	17	18	21	15	22	14	10	1	Ret	16	14	Ret	20	15	21	16	16	17	16	16	24	Ret	33	149
9	(Switzerland) Yannik Brandt	30	Ret	DNS	27	24	27	Ret	Ret	20	15	18	12	17	14	Ret	20	11	13	23	20	24	Ret	15	22	92.5
10	(Netherlands) Richard Verschoor										12	24	6				7	5	5							65
11	(Germany) Julian Hanses	29	21	23	29	19	24	Ret	23	Ret	16	27	17	23	26	18	27	26	Ret	12	Ret	12	29	26	21	65
12	(Germany) Andreas Estner	22	28	21	24	26	17	19	Ret	DNQ	24	28	22	24	25	22	23	28	21				21	Ret	17	61
13	(Switzerland) Ricardo Feller	27	26	26	22	23	15	22	18	26	20	25	Ret										Ret	20	25	41
14	(Norway) Kenneth Gulbrandsen	16	20	10	Ret	22	18	DNQ	DNQ	DNQ																37
15	(Venezuela) Sebastián Fernández													12	8	25	17	24	19							34
16	(Switzerland) Giacomo Bianchi																25	Ret	25				19	24	29	18
Pos	Driver	OSC1 (Germany)			SAC (Germany)			LAU (Germany)			OSC2 (Germany)			RBR (Austria)			NÜR (Germany)			ZAN (Netherlands)			HOC (Germany)			Pts

=== Teams' championship ===
Pos	Team	Points
1	(Italy) Prema Powerteam	459.5
2	(Netherlands) Van Amersfoort Racing	455
3	(Germany) ADAC Berlin-Brandenburg	356
4	(Germany) US Racing	351
5	(Austria) Lechner Racing	240
6	(Austria) Neuhauser Racing	220
7	(Germany) Motopark	183.5
8	(Switzerland) Jenzer Motorsport	34
9	(Germany) Team Timo Scheider	29.5
10	(Germany) Team Piro Sport Interdental	18
11	(Germany) Liqui Moly Team Engstler	13
12	(Germany) KUG-Motorsport	11
13	(Switzerland) RB Racing	7
14	(Germany) Rennsport Rössler	2
14	(Denmark) RS Competition	1
