= 2015 ADAC Formula 4 Championship =

Formula racing season

The 2015 ADAC Formula 4 season was the inaugural season of the ADAC Formula 4, which replaced the ADAC Formel Masters. It began on 25 April at Oschersleben and finished on 4 October at Hockenheim after eight triple header rounds. Champion Marvin Dienst took 8 wins, as runner-up Sweden Joel Eriksson won 7 races. Joey Mawson won five races while Mick Schumacher, Lando Norris, Ralf Aron and David Beckmann won one race each.

== Teams and drivers ==
Team	No.	Driver	Status	Rounds
(Austria) Neuhauser Racing	1	(Germany) Kim-Luis Schramm		All
(Austria) Neuhauser Racing	2	(Germany) Tim Zimmermann		All
(Germany) ADAC Berlin-Brandenburg	3	(Germany) Benjamin Mazatis	R	All
(Germany) ADAC Berlin-Brandenburg	4	(Russia) Robert Shwartzman		1–7
(Germany) ADAC Berlin-Brandenburg	5	(Germany) David Beckmann	R	2–8
(Germany) ADAC Berlin-Brandenburg	6	(Germany) Mike David Ortmann	R	All
(Germany) ADAC Berlin-Brandenburg	12	(Austria) Thomas Preining	R	1–2
(Germany) ADAC Berlin-Brandenburg	31	(Russia) Yan Leon Shlom	R	6–8
(Germany) ADAC Berlin-Brandenburg	69	(United Kingdom) Lando Norris	(Note: Lando Norris was considered rookie for rounds 3 and 5, however prior to round 8, he was reclassified as a non-rookie and therefore his results and victories from this category have been erased. David Beckmann inherits the Brit's four rookie wins as he finished runner-up to Norris in all of them.)	3, 5, 8
(Germany) Motopark	7	(Sweden) Joel Eriksson		All
(Germany) Motopark	8	(Germany) Jannes Fittje	R	All
(Germany) Motopark	9	(Venezuela) Jonathan Cecotto	R	All
(Germany) Motopark	10	(Germany) Michael Waldherr		All
(Germany) Team Timo Scheider	11	(Germany) Leon Wippersteg	R	1
(Germany) Team Timo Scheider	30	(Germany) Jason Kremer		3–8
(Germany) Team Timo Scheider	31	(Russia) Yan Leon Shlom	R	1–2, 4
(Germany) Team Timo Scheider	46	(Brazil) Mauro Auricchio		All
(Germany) Piro Sports	13	(Germany) Cedric Piro		All
(Germany) Piro Sports	34	(Germany) Toni Wolf	R	1–3
(Switzerland) Jenzer Motorsport	14	(Switzerland) Moritz Müller-Crepon		All
(Switzerland) Jenzer Motorsport	15	(Germany) David Kolkmann		1–4, 6–8
(Switzerland) Jenzer Motorsport	16	(Germany) Marek Böckmann		All
(Switzerland) Jenzer Motorsport	17	(Germany) Arlind Hoti	R	2–4
(Switzerland) Jenzer Motorsport	41	(Switzerland) Nico Rindlisbacher	R	5–6
(Switzerland) SMG Swiss Motorsport	18	(Switzerland) Giorgio Maggi		1–4
(Switzerland) SMG Swiss Motorsport	19	(Italy) Mattia Drudi		1–3
(Switzerland) SMG Swiss Motorsport	20	(Switzerland) Nikolaj Rogivue		1–5
(Switzerland) Race Performance	18	(Switzerland) Giorgio Maggi		5–8
(Switzerland) Race Performance	23	(Switzerland) Alain Valente		1–3
(Switzerland) Race Performance	29	(Switzerland) Lucas Mauron		2
(Switzerland) Race Performance	55	(Switzerland) Marylin Niederhauser		1, 3–8
(Switzerland) Nikolaj Rogivue	20	(Switzerland) Nikolaj Rogivue		6–8
(Germany) Engstler Motorsport	21	(Germany) Michelle Halder		All
(Germany) Engstler Motorsport	38	(Germany) Luca Engstler	R	All
(Austria) Lechner Racing	22	(Austria) Florian Janits		1–3, 7
(Austria) Lechner Racing	39	(Germany) Kevin Kratz		7–8
(Austria) Lechner Racing	66	(Germany) Marcel Lenerz		1–2
(Austria) Lechner Racing	79	(Austria) Max Hofer	R	8
(Germany) Robin Brezina	24	(Germany) Robin Brezina	R	1–5, 7–8
(Netherlands) Van Amersfoort Racing	25	(Germany) Mick Schumacher	R	All
(Netherlands) Van Amersfoort Racing	26	(United Kingdom) Harrison Newey		1, 3–6, 8
(Netherlands) Van Amersfoort Racing	36	(Australia) Joey Mawson		All
(Netherlands) Van Amersfoort Racing	37	(Canada) Kami Moreira-Laliberté	R	5, 7–8
(Germany) HTP Junior Team	27	(Germany) Marvin Dienst		All
(Germany) HTP Junior Team	28	(Netherlands) Janneau Esmeijer		All
(Germany) HTP Junior Team	35	(Germany) Carrie Schreiner	R	2–8
(Italy) Prema Powerteam	32	(China) Guanyu Zhou	R	1–3
(Italy) Prema Powerteam	66	(Brazil) Giuliano Raucci	R	5
(Italy) Prema Powerteam	99	(Estonia) Ralf Aron		1–3, 5
(Denmark) RS Competition	33	(Denmark) Jan Jønck		1–7
(Denmark) RS Competition	43	(Belgium) Benjamin Bailly		7
(Denmark) RS Competition	44	(Germany) Glenn Rupp	R	1–5
(Germany) Toni Wolf	34	(Germany) Toni Wolf	R	4–8
(Netherlands) Provily Racing	77	(Netherlands) Job van Uitert	R	All
(Australia) Luis Leeds	96	(Australia) Luis Leeds	R	8

Icon	Legend
R	Rookie

== Race calendar ==
The calendar was published on 12 December 2014. All rounds, except for the second Oschersleben round supporting DTM, were part of ADAC GT Masters weekends.

Round		Circuit	Date	Supporting
1	R1	(Germany) Motorsport Arena Oschersleben, Oschersleben	25 April	ADAC GT Masters
1	R2	(Germany) Motorsport Arena Oschersleben, Oschersleben	26 April	ADAC GT Masters
1	R3	(Germany) Motorsport Arena Oschersleben, Oschersleben	26 April	ADAC GT Masters
2	R1	(Austria) Red Bull Ring, Spielberg	6 June	ADAC GT Masters
2	R2	(Austria) Red Bull Ring, Spielberg	7 June	ADAC GT Masters
2	R3	(Austria) Red Bull Ring, Spielberg	7 June	ADAC GT Masters
3	R1	(Belgium) Circuit de Spa-Francorchamps, Stavelot	20 June	ADAC GT Masters
3	R2	(Belgium) Circuit de Spa-Francorchamps, Stavelot	21 June	ADAC GT Masters
3	R3	(Belgium) Circuit de Spa-Francorchamps, Stavelot	21 June	ADAC GT Masters
4	R1	(Germany) Lausitzring, Klettwitz	4 July	ADAC GT Masters
4	R2	(Germany) Lausitzring, Klettwitz	4 July	ADAC GT Masters
4	R3	(Germany) Lausitzring, Klettwitz	5 July	ADAC GT Masters
5	R1	(Germany) Nürburgring, Nürburg	15 August	ADAC GT Masters
5	R2	(Germany) Nürburgring, Nürburg	15 August	ADAC GT Masters
5	R3	(Germany) Nürburgring, Nürburg	16 August	ADAC GT Masters
6	R1	(Germany) Sachsenring, Chemnitz	29 August	ADAC GT Masters
6	R2	(Germany) Sachsenring, Chemnitz	29 August	ADAC GT Masters
6	R3	(Germany) Sachsenring, Chemnitz	30 August	ADAC GT Masters
7	R1	(Germany) Motorsport Arena Oschersleben, Oschersleben	12 September	DTM
7	R2	(Germany) Motorsport Arena Oschersleben, Oschersleben	13 September	DTM
7	R3	(Germany) Motorsport Arena Oschersleben, Oschersleben	13 September	DTM
8	R1	(Germany) Hockenheimring, Hockenheim	3 October	ADAC GT Masters
8	R2	(Germany) Hockenheimring, Hockenheim	3 October	ADAC GT Masters
8	R3	(Germany) Hockenheimring, Hockenheim	4 October	ADAC GT Masters

== Race results ==
Round		Circuit	Pole position	Fastest lap	Winning driver	Winning team	Rookie winner
1	R1	(Germany) Motorsport Arena Oschersleben, Oschersleben	(Netherlands) Janneau Esmeijer	(Estonia) Ralf Aron	(Germany) Marvin Dienst	(Germany) HTP Junior Team	(Germany) Mick Schumacher
1	R2	(Germany) Motorsport Arena Oschersleben, Oschersleben	(Germany) Marvin Dienst	(Netherlands) Janneau Esmeijer	(Germany) Marvin Dienst	(Germany) HTP Junior Team	(China) Guanyu Zhou
1	R3	(Germany) Motorsport Arena Oschersleben, Oschersleben		(Australia) Joseph Mawson	(Germany) Mick Schumacher	(Netherlands) Van Amersfoort Racing	(Germany) Mick Schumacher
2	R1	(Austria) Red Bull Ring, Spielberg	(Sweden) Joel Eriksson	(Germany) David Beckmann	(Sweden) Joel Eriksson	(Germany) Motopark	(China) Guanyu Zhou
2	R2	(Austria) Red Bull Ring, Spielberg	(Australia) Joseph Mawson	(Russia) Robert Shwartzman	(Sweden) Joel Eriksson	(Germany) Motopark	(China) Guanyu Zhou
2	R3	(Austria) Red Bull Ring, Spielberg		(Germany) Michael Waldherr	(Australia) Joseph Mawson	(Netherlands) Van Amersfoort Racing	(Germany) David Beckmann
3	R1	(Belgium) Circuit de Spa-Francorchamps, Stavelot	(Sweden) Joel Eriksson	(Russia) Robert Shwartzman	(Sweden) Joel Eriksson	(Germany) Motopark	(China) Guanyu Zhou
3	R2	(Belgium) Circuit de Spa-Francorchamps, Stavelot	(Sweden) Joel Eriksson	(United Kingdom) Lando Norris	(Sweden) Joel Eriksson	(Germany) Motopark	(Germany) David Beckmann
3	R3	(Belgium) Circuit de Spa-Francorchamps, Stavelot		(United Kingdom) Lando Norris	(United Kingdom) Lando Norris	(Germany) ADAC Berlin-Brandenburg	(Germany) David Beckmann
4	R1	(Germany) Lausitzring, Klettwitz	(Germany) Marvin Dienst	(Russia) Robert Shwartzman	(Australia) Joseph Mawson	(Netherlands) Van Amersfoort Racing	(Germany) Mike David Ortmann
4	R2	(Germany) Lausitzring, Klettwitz	(Germany) Marvin Dienst	(Russia) Robert Shwartzman	(Sweden) Joel Eriksson	(Germany) Motopark	(Germany) Mike David Ortmann
4	R3	(Germany) Lausitzring, Klettwitz		(Australia) Joseph Mawson	(Germany) Marvin Dienst	(Germany) HTP Junior Team	(Germany) Mike David Ortmann
5	R1	(Germany) Nürburgring, Nürburg	(Netherlands) Janneau Esmeijer	(Germany) Marvin Dienst	(Germany) Marvin Dienst	(Germany) HTP Junior Team	(Germany) David Beckmann
5	R2	(Germany) Nürburgring, Nürburg	(Netherlands) Janneau Esmeijer	(Germany) Marvin Dienst	(Germany) Marvin Dienst	(Germany) HTP Junior Team	(Germany) David Beckmann
5	R3	(Germany) Nürburgring, Nürburg		(Estonia) Ralf Aron	(Estonia) Ralf Aron	(Italy) Prema Powerteam	(Germany) David Beckmann
6	R1	(Germany) Sachsenring, Chemnitz	(Germany) Marvin Dienst	(Germany) Marvin Dienst	(Germany) Marvin Dienst	(Germany) HTP Junior Team	(Germany) Mick Schumacher
6	R2	(Germany) Sachsenring, Chemnitz	(Germany) Marvin Dienst	(Germany) Marvin Dienst	(Germany) Marvin Dienst	(Germany) HTP Junior Team	(Germany) David Beckmann
6	R3	(Germany) Sachsenring, Chemnitz		(Germany) Marvin Dienst	(Australia) Joseph Mawson	(Netherlands) Van Amersfoort Racing	(Germany) Mike David Ortmann
7	R1	(Germany) Motorsport Arena Oschersleben, Oschersleben	(Netherlands) Janneau Esmeijer	(Sweden) Joel Eriksson	(Sweden) Joel Eriksson	(Germany) Motopark	(Germany) Mick Schumacher
7	R2	(Germany) Motorsport Arena Oschersleben, Oschersleben	(Netherlands) Janneau Esmeijer	(Germany) Marvin Dienst	(Sweden) Joel Eriksson	(Germany) Motopark	(Germany) Mick Schumacher
7	R3	(Germany) Motorsport Arena Oschersleben, Oschersleben		(Australia) Joseph Mawson	(Australia) Joseph Mawson	(Netherlands) Van Amersfoort Racing	(Germany) Mike David Ortmann
8	R1	(Germany) Hockenheimring, Hockenheim	(Germany) Marvin Dienst	(Netherlands) Janneau Esmeijer	(Germany) Marvin Dienst	(Germany) HTP Junior Team	(Germany) David Beckmann
8	R2	(Germany) Hockenheimring, Hockenheim	(Germany) Marvin Dienst	(United Kingdom) Lando Norris	(Germany) David Beckmann	(Germany) ADAC Berlin-Brandenburg	(Germany) David Beckmann
8	R3	(Germany) Hockenheimring, Hockenheim		(Australia) Joseph Mawson	(Australia) Joseph Mawson	(Netherlands) Van Amersfoort Racing	(Germany) David Beckmann

== Championship standings ==
Points were awarded to the top 10 classified finishers in each race. No points were awarded for pole position or fastest lap.

Position	**1st**	**2nd**	**3rd**	**4th**	**5th**	**6th**	**7th**	**8th**	**9th**	**10th**
Points	25	18	15	12	10	8	6	4	2	1

=== Drivers' Championship ===
Pos	Driver	OSC (Germany)			RBR (Austria)			SPA (Belgium)			LAU (Germany)			NÜR (Germany)			SAC (Germany)			OSC (Germany)			HOC (Germany)			Pts
1	(Germany) Marvin Dienst	1	**1**	6	Ret	3	20	Ret	6	14	**3**	**6**	1	1	1	3	**1**	**1**	2	2	2	4	**1**	**4**	Ret	347
2	(Sweden) Joel Eriksson	4	9	5	**1**	1	Ret	**1**	**1**	4	EX	1	9	4	10	6	2	2	6	1	1	9	17	8	3	299
3	(Australia) Joseph Mawson	6	4	2	10	**Ret**	1	5	7	2	1	2	2	8	8	7	4	3	1	7	26	1	10	3	1	297
4	(Russia) Robert Shwartzman	Ret	10	12	6	32	30	3	3	3	2	3	3	6	3	5	27	7	10	3	Ret	5				167
5	(Germany) David Beckmann				7	Ret	3	7	11	7	5	Ret	18	5	4	8	7	5	5	15	5	11	2	1	2	166
6	(Germany) Tim Zimmermann	8	6	32	5	2	Ret	13	Ret	6	12	7	4	10	27	9	3	6	8	6	4	2	4	7	Ret	152
7	(Netherlands) Janneau Esmeijer	**Ret**	2	Ret	9	6	2	8	8	12	13	4	Ret	**2**	**2**	4	24	Ret	9	**13**	**24**	6	11	Ret	4	136
8	(United Kingdom) Lando Norris							4	2	1				3	5	2							3	2	DNS	131
9	(Estonia) Ralf Aron	2	3	4	2	Ret	Ret	6	4	Ret				7	7	1										120
10	(Germany) Mick Schumacher	9	12	1	Ret	10	DNS	15	15	34	EX	16	Ret	9	6	10	5	Ret	18	4	3	31	Ret	5	7	92
11	(Germany) Michael Waldherr	5	21	8	4	5	4	11	20	8	Ret	8	7	14	Ret	Ret	10	9	Ret	5	Ret	8	8	Ret	17	83
12	(Germany) Mike David Ortmann	14	14	13	13	13	7	Ret	25	17	4	5	5	30	11	15	8	13	4	14	6	7	5	14	Ret	78
13	(Germany) Kim-Luis Schramm	Ret	33	10	15	8	6	14	18	5	7	9	17	17	29	13	9	4	3	Ret	Ret	20	14	Ret	5	70
14	(Italy) Mattia Drudi	3	5	7	8	4	Ret	DNS	10	DNS																48
15	(China) Guanyu Zhou	28	8	18	3	7	Ret	2	Ret	9																45
16	(United Kingdom) Harrison Newey	7	13	27				Ret	5	16	15	Ret	10	Ret	13	18	6	10	11				7	9	6	42
17	(Germany) Marek Böckmann	13	23	28	11	33	29	10	9	26	18	Ret	8	33	9	12	Ret	Ret	Ret	8	10	3	9	Ret	9	33
18	(Germany) Jannes Fittje	17	15	17	Ret	12	18	21	12	15	6	10	6	18	16	16	12	12	12	10	8	29	24	16	27	22
19	(Germany) Jason Kremer							22	19	21	10	Ret	Ret	19	17	11	11	8	7	DNS	13	13	13	6	13	19
20	(Venezuela) Jonathan Cecotto	12	11	9	12	9	5	18	14	11	8	24	23	11	15	27	14	22	Ret	18	25	15	18	Ret	23	18
21	(Austria) Thomas Preining	10	29	3	14	30	26																			16
22	(Germany) Toni Wolf	Ret	28	19	DNQ	27	23	27	24	19	Ret	13	13	32	Ret	22	23	14	19	Ret	7	19	6	11	22	14
23	(Switzerland) Giorgio Maggi	11	7	11	26	25	15	9	17	Ret	11	22	Ret	26	22	26	Ret	17	20	12	19	23	25	20	Ret	8
24	(Germany) Cedric Piro	Ret	34	22	23	31	10	Ret	29	DNS	9	Ret	12	22	Ret	31	16	Ret	14	9	18	10	16	Ret	Ret	6
25	(Canada) Kami Moreira-Laliberté													12	20	Ret				20	12	Ret	12	10	8	5
26	(Switzerland) Lucas Mauron				19	19	8																			4
27	(Russia) Yan Leon Shlom	22	25	14	18	17	9				17	17	14				21	23	15	Ret	Ret	30	Ret	19	18	2
28	(Belgium) Benjamin Bailly																			17	9	14				2
29	(Switzerland) Moritz Müller-Crepon	23	31	26	28	18	13	24	22	18	16	Ret	22	20	19	23	13	15	23	22	Ret	26	15	25	10	1
30	(Switzerland) Alain Valente	24	DNQ	Ret	29	22	17	19	16	10																1
31	(Switzerland) Nikolaj Rogivue	25	Ret	23	25	20	16	Ret	31	DNS	Ret	15	16	DNQ	DNQ	DNQ	18	11	16	19	11	17	19	13	Ret	0
32	(Germany) Arlind Hoti				16	16	11	20	27	23	Ret	11	26													0
33	(Netherlands) Job van Uitert	21	20	20	17	Ret	24	16	26	22	23	20	11	15	12	21	DNS	19	21	Ret	Ret	22	20	12	Ret	0
34	(Germany) David Kolkmann	27	30	25	27	28	19	26	30	24	20	18	15				15	16	13	11	14	12	22	21	12	0
35	(Germany) Marcel Lenerz	16	17	29	Ret	11	21																			0
36	(Australia) Luis Leeds																						26	18	11	0
37	(Austria) Florian Janits	15	16	16	21	15	31	12	13	33										25	16	25				0
38	(Denmark) Jan Jønck	19	19	15	Ret	DNQ	DNQ	Ret	Ret	29	14	12	Ret	23	18	20	26	21	Ret	23	17	16				0
39	(Germany) Luca Engstler	29	27	Ret	22	23	12	25	34	25	Ret	21	25	27	23	25	17	18	22	21	20	18	23	Ret	16	0
40	(Brazil) Mauro Auricchio	18	24	24	Ret	21	22	29	23	13	21	14	19	24	21	24	DNQ	DNQ	DNQ	Ret	DNS	DNS	21	Ret	14	0
41	(Brazil) Giuliano Raucci													13	28	14										0
42	(Germany) Glenn Rupp	DNQ	DNQ	DNQ	24	14	14	17	35	32	EX	Ret	20	DNS	DNS	DNS										0
43	(Switzerland) Nico Rindlisbacher													14	21	28	Ret	Ret	Ret							0
44	(Germany) Carrie Schreiner				DNQ	DNQ	DNQ	30	33	27	19	19	Ret	28	26	29	19	24	17	29	15	Ret	Ret	15	21	0
45	(Germany) Robin Brezina	20	26	30	20	24	28	28	28	20	EX	Ret	21	25	Ret	19				16	21	21	Ret	17	15	0
46	(Germany) Benjamin Mazatis	Ret	18	31	Ret	26	25	23	21	28	25	Ret	Ret	16	Ret	17	25	20	25	24	Ret	24	Ret	23	19	0
47	(Germany) Michelle Halder	DNQ	DNQ	DNQ	30	29	27	31	32	31	22	Ret	24	31	24	30	20	25	24	27	22	27	Ret	22	20	0
48	(Germany) Leon Wippersteg	26	22	21																						0
49	(Switzerland) Marylin Niederhauser	DNQ	32	DNQ				32	Ret	30	24	23	Ret	29	25	Ret	22	26	Ret	28	23	28	Ret	26	24	0
50	(Germany) Kevin Kratz																			26	Ret	Ret	Ret	24	25	0
51	(Austria) Max Hofer																						Ret	27	26	0
Pos	Driver	OSC (Germany)			RBR (Austria)			SPA (Belgium)			LAU (Germany)			NÜR (Germany)			SAC (Germany)			OSC (Germany)			HOC (Germany)			Pts

Colour	Result
Gold	Winner
Silver	Second place
Bronze	Third place
Green	Points classification
Blue	Non-points classification
Blue	Non-classified finish (NC)
Purple	Retired, not classified (Ret)
Red	Did not qualify (DNQ)
Red	Did not pre-qualify (DNPQ)
Black	Disqualified (DSQ)
White	Did not start (DNS)
White	Withdrew (WD)
White	Race cancelled (C)
Blank	Did not practice (DNP)
Blank	Did not arrive (DNA)
Blank	Excluded (EX)

**Bold** – Pole
Italics – Fastest Lap

=== Rookies' Championship ===
Pos	Driver	OSC (Germany)			RBR (Austria)			SPA (Belgium)			LAU (Germany)			NÜR (Germany)			SAC (Germany)			OSC (Germany)			HOC (Germany)			Pts
1	(Germany) David Beckmann				7	Ret	3	7	11	7	5	Ret	18	5	4	8	7	5	5	15	5	11	2	1	2	396
2	(Germany) Mike David Ortmann	14	14	13	13	13	7	Ret	25	17	4	5	5	30	11	15	8	13	4	14	6	7	5	14	Ret	327
3	(Germany) Mick Schumacher	9	12	1	Ret	10	DNS	15	15	34	EX	16	Ret	9	6	10	5	Ret	18	4	3	31	Ret	5	7	290
4	(Germany) Jannes Fittje	17	15	17	Ret	12	18	21	12	15	6	10	6	18	16	16	12	12	12	10	8	29	24	16	27	230
5	(Venezuela) Jonathan Cecotto	12	11	9	12	9	5	18	14	11	9	24	23	11	15	27	14	22	Ret	18	25	15	18	Ret	23	221
6	(China) Guanyu Zhou	28	8	18	3	7	Ret	2	Ret	9																128
7	(Netherlands) Job van Uitert	21	20	20	17	Ret	24	16	26	22	23	20	11	15	12	21	DNS	19	21	Ret	Ret	22	20	12	Ret	124
8	(Germany) Toni Wolf	Ret	28	19	DNQ	27	23	27	24	19	Ret	13	13	32	Ret	22	23	14	19	Ret	7	19	6	11	22	116
9	(Russia) Yan Leon Shlom	22	25	14	18	17	9				17	17	14				21	23	15	Ret	Ret	30	Ret	19	18	85
10	(Germany) Luca Engstler	29	27	Ret	22	23	12	25	34	25	Ret	21	25	27	23	25	17	18	22	21	20	18	23	Ret	16	77
11	(Canada) Kami Moreira-Laliberté													12	20	Ret				20	12	Ret	12	10	8	72
12	(Germany) Robin Brezina	20	26	30	20	24	28	28	28	20	EX	Ret	21	25	Ret	19				16	21	21	Ret	17	15	64
13	(Germany) Benjamin Mazatis	Ret	18	31	Ret	26	25	23	21	28	25	Ret	Ret	16	Ret	17	25	20	25	24	Ret	24	Ret	23	19	53
14	(Germany) Arlind Hoti				16	16	11	20	27	23	Ret	11	26													49
15	(Austria) Thomas Preining	10	29	3	14	30	27																			46
16	(Germany) Carrie Schreiner				DNQ	DNQ	DNQ	30	33	27	19	19	Ret	28	26	29	19	24	17	29	15	Ret	Ret	15	21	45
17	(Germany) Glenn Rupp	DNQ	DNQ	DNQ	24	14	14	17	35	32	EX	Ret	20	DNS	DNS	DNS										30
18	(Brazil) Giuliano Raucci													13	28	14										25
19	(Germany) Michelle Halder	DNQ	DNQ	DNQ	30	29	27	31	32	31	22	Ret	24	31	24	30	20	25	24	27	22	27	Ret	22	20	20
20	(Switzerland) Nico Rindlisbacher													14	21	28	Ret	Ret	Ret							12
21	(Germany) Leon Wippersteg	26	22	21																						5
22	(Switzerland) Marylin Niederhauser	DNQ	32	DNQ				32	Ret	30	24	23	Ret	29	25	Ret	22	26	Ret	28	23	28	Ret	26	24	5
23	(Germany) Kevin Kratz																			26	Ret	Ret	Ret	24	25	1
Pos	Driver	OSC (Germany)			RBR (Austria)			SPA (Belgium)			LAU (Germany)			NÜR (Germany)			SAC (Germany)			OSC (Germany)			HOC (Germany)			Pts
