= Max Hofer =

Austrian racing driver (born 1999)

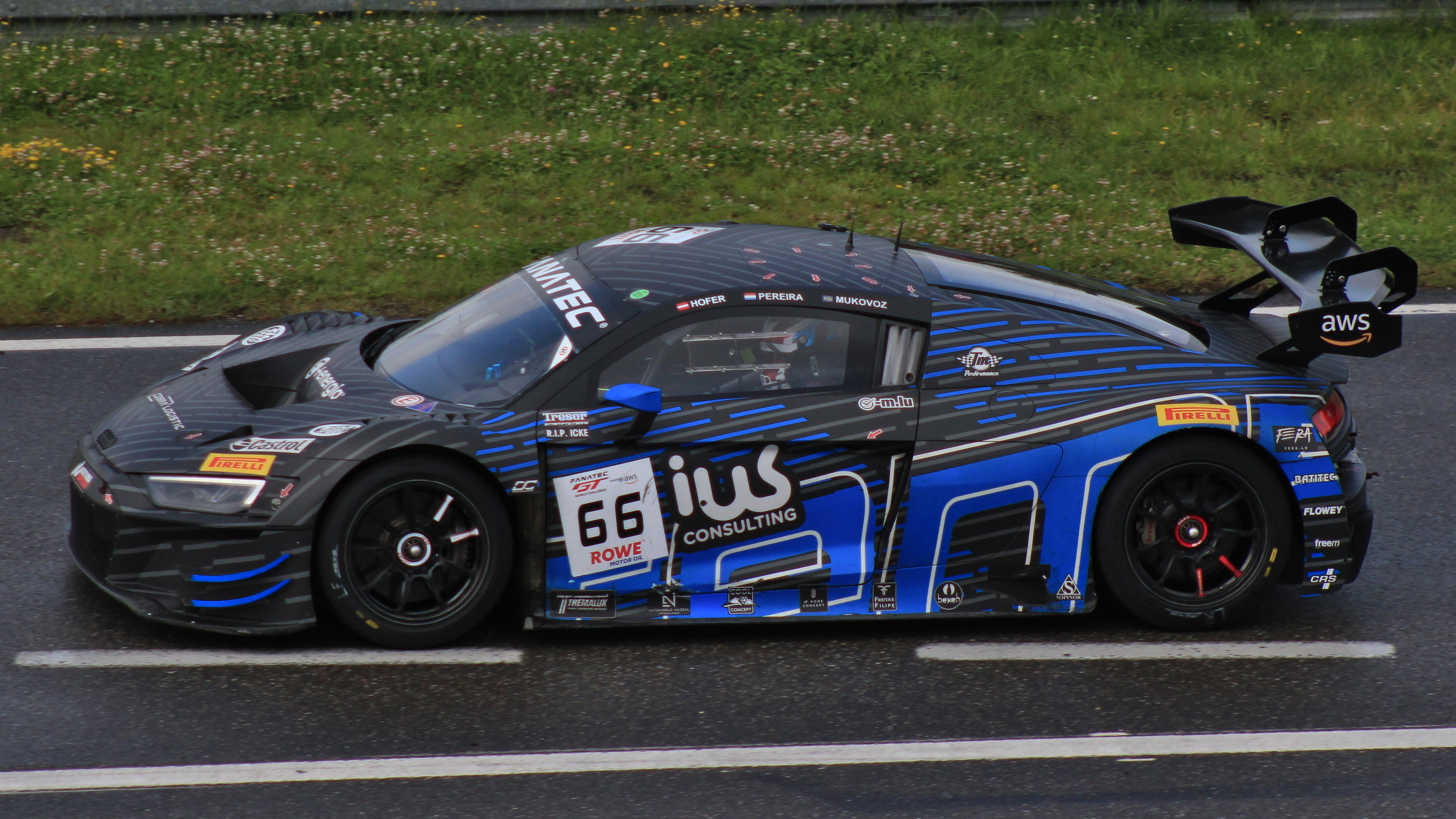
- Hofer in 2024
- Nationality: (Austria) Austrian
- Born: Maximilian Hofer; 23 May 1999 (age 27) Vienna, Austria
- Categorisation: FIA Silver

Championship titles
- 2024: GT World Challenge Europe Sprint Cup – Gold Cup

Maximilian Hofer (born 23 May 1999 in Vienna) is an Austrian racing driver who last competed for Pure Rxcing in GT World Challenge Europe Endurance Cup.

A former Audi factory driver, Hofer is the 2024 GT World Challenge Europe Sprint Cup Gold Cup champion and is a race winner in ADAC GT Masters.

== Career ==
Following a brief stint in professional radio-controlled car races, Hofer began karting in 2010. Winning the Austrian Kart Cup that same year, he won two Rotax Max Challenge Eastern Europe titles in 2013 and 2014 in Junior Max before stepping up to the DD2 class for his final year in karts.

Having made his car racing debut in the final round of the 2015 ADAC Formula 4 Championship for Lechner Racing, Hofer switched to the Audi Sport TT Cup for 2016 to make his full-time debut in cars. He scored a lone podium, finishing third in the second Zandvoort race, and ended the season seventh in points.

Hofer then moved to the ADAC TCR Germany Touring Car Championship for 2017 by joining Prosport Racing alongside Sheldon van der Linde. In his only season in TCR competition, Hofer scored one podium at the season-finale at the Hockenheimring by finishing second behind series champion Josh Files as he ended the season 11th in points.

The following year, Hofer joined Phoenix Racing to make his debut in ADAC GT Masters, driving an Audi R8 LMS Evo. In his rookie year in GT3 competition, Hofer won on debut at Oschersleben, which helped him to finish 16th in points after taking two more points finishes in the remaining six rounds of the season.

Remaining in ADAC GT Masters for 2019, Hofer switched to Audi-affiliated Montaplast by Land-Motorsport alongside Christopher Mies. Scoring podiums at Autodrom Most, Zandvoort and both races at Sachsenring, as he won the Junior Class title at season's end despite not taking an overall win.

Having been set to join R-Motorsport for a dual campaign GT World Challenge Europe Endurance Cup and GT World Challenge Europe Sprint Cup, Hofer partnered with Christopher Haase to remain with Montaplast by Land-Motorsport for a third season in ADAC GT Masters. The duo won at the second Lausitzring round and stood on the podium at the first Lausitzring round and at Hockenheimring as they finished fifth in points.

Hofer eventually made his GT World Challenge Europe Endurance Cup the following year with Audi factory team Attempto Racing alongside Dennis Marschall and Alex Aka. He scored a lone class podium at the Nürburgring and ended the year fourth in the Silver Class standings, while also making his GT World Challenge Europe Sprint Cup debut earlier that year for the same team.

The following year, Hofer joined Aust Motorsport to compete in the GTC Race championship, whilst also competing part-time in International GT Open for the same team. Hofer took four wins in the latter to take the GT3 title at season's end, whilst in the latter he took a Pro-Am win at the Red Bull Ring.

Joining the Audi factory programme in 2023, Hofer joined Comtoyou Racing to compete in GT World Challenge Europe Endurance Cup and Melbourne Performance Centre in GT World Challenge Australia. In the former, Hofer took class wins at Monza and Le Castellet, and scored a further class podium at the 24 Hours of Spa, but missed out on the Gold Cup title as he missed the 3 Hours of Nürburgring. In the latter, Hofer took five wins but was ineligible to score points from round three onwards to end the year 11th in points.

After Audi disbanded its factory programme following 2023, Hofer stayed with Tresor Attempto Racing to race in the GT World Challenge Europe Endurance Cup and also joined Team Engstler to compete in GT World Challenge Europe Sprint Cup. In the former, Hofer won the 24 Hours of Spa in the Bronze class alongside Alexey Nesov and Andrey Mukovoz, which helped them to finish sixth in class at season's end. In the latter, Hofer teamed up with Luca Engstler as they drove an Audi for all but one rounds as they took Gold Cup wins at Brands Hatch and at Hockenheimring, the only round where they drove a Lamborghini, on their way to the Gold Cup title at season's end.

Hofer remained with Tresor Attempto Racing for 2025 alongside Nesov and Mukovoz in the Bronze class of the GT World Challenge Europe Endurance Cup. In Hofer's second season in the Bronze class, Hofer scored a lone class podium at Barcelona to end the year 20th in the class standings. The following year, Hofer joined Porsche-affiliated Pure Rxcing for his second season in the GT World Challenge Europe Endurance Cup. In his first season in Porsche machinery, Hofer took a lone Silver class win at Le Castellet to end the year fifth in points.

== Karting record ==
=== Karting career summary ===
Season	Series	Team	Position
2011	Rotax Max Challenge Eastern Europe – Junior Max		3rd
2012	Rotax Max Challenge Eastern Europe – Junior Max		2nd
2012	Rotax Max Challenge Grand Finals — Junior Max		37th
2012	Karting Academy Trophy	Speedworld Academy Team	24th
2013	Rotax Max Challenge Eastern Europe – Junior Max		1st
2013	Rotax Max Euro Trophy – Junior Max	KMS Hungary	57th
2013	Rotax International Open – Junior		11th
2013	Rotax Max Challenge Grand Finals — 125 Junior	Speedworld Academy	18th
2014	Florida Winter Tour – Rotax Junior		44th
2014	Rotax Max Challenge Eastern Europe – Junior Max		1st
2014	Rotax Max Euro Trophy – Junior Max	KMS Birel Motorsport; Team TKP (Note: Hofer competed for KMS Birel Motorsport in Rounds 1–3, ran for Team TKP in round 4.)	10th
2014	Rotax Max Challenge Grand Finals — Junior Max	Speedworld Academy	5th
2015	Rotax Winter Trophy – DD2	Speedworld	16th
2015	Rotax Max Euro Trophy – DD2	Speedworld	20th
2015	Rotax Max Challenge World Final — DD2	SWA PB KMS	31st

== Racing record ==
=== Racing career summary ===
Season	Series	Team	Races	Wins	Poles	F/Laps	Podiums	Points	Position
2015	ADAC Formula 4 Championship	Lechner Racing	3	0	0	0	0	0	51st
2016	Audi Sport TT Cup	—N/a	14	0	0	0	1	156	7th
2017	ADAC TCR Germany Touring Car Championship	AC 1927 Mayen e.V. im ADAC	14	0	0	1	1	177	11th
2018	ADAC GT Masters	Phoenix Racing	14	1	1	0	1	39	16th
2018	VLN Series – SP9	Phoenix Racing	1	0	0	0	0	0	NC
2018	24 Hours of Nürburgring – SP8	Phoenix Racing	1	0	0	0	0	—N/a	DNF
2018	Super Taikyu – ST-X	Phoenix Racing Asia	1	0	0	0	0	19‡	9th‡
2019	ADAC GT Masters	Montaplast by Land-Motorsport	14	0	1	1	4	134	4th
2020	ADAC GT Masters	Montaplast by Land-Motorsport	14	1	0	0	3	127	5th
2021	GT World Challenge Europe Endurance Cup	Attempto Racing	4	0	0	0	0	2	30th
2021	GT World Challenge Europe Endurance Cup – Silver Cup	Attempto Racing	4	0	0	0	1	65	4th
2021	GT World Challenge Europe Sprint Cup	Attempto Racing	2	0	0	0	0	0	NC
2021	ADAC GT Masters	GRT Grasser Racing Team	2	0	0	0	0	2	42nd
2021	24 Hours of Nürburgring – SP9 Pro-Am	Phoenix-IronForce Racing	1	0	0	0	1	—N/a	**2nd**
2021	Nürburgring Langstrecken-Serie – Cup 3	Teichmann Racing GTX	1	0	0	0	0	0	NC
2021	Italian GT Endurance Championship – GT3	Easy Race	2	0	0	0	0	0	NC
2022	International GT Open – Pro-Am	Aust Motorsport	7	1	0	1	2	30	9th
2022	Nürburgring Langstrecken-Serie – SPX	True Racing	3	0	0	0	0	0	NC
2022	24 Hours of Nürburgring – SPX	KTM True Racing	1	0	0	0	0	—N/a	DNF
2023	GT World Challenge Australia – GT3 Pro-Am	Melbourne Performance Centre	13	5	0	0	10	75	11th
2023	GT World Challenge Europe Endurance Cup	Comtoyou Racing	4	0	0	0	0	8	18th
2023	GT World Challenge Europe Endurance Cup – Gold	Comtoyou Racing	4	2	0	1	3	94	**2nd**
2023	24H GT Series – GT3 Pro	HAAS RT	1	0	0	0	0	0	NC
2023	24H GT Series – GT3 Pro-Am	HAAS RT	1	1	0	0	0	0	NC
2023	Nürburgring Langstrecken-Serie – SP9	Audi Sport Team Car Collection	1	0	0	0	0	0	NC
2023	24 Hours of Nürburgring – SP9 Pro	Audi Sport Team Car Collection	1	0	0	0	0	—N/a	11th
2024	GT World Challenge Europe Endurance Cup	Tresor Attempto Racing	5	0	0	0	0	8	23rd
2024	GT World Challenge Europe Endurance Cup – Bronze	Tresor Attempto Racing	5	1	0	0	2	53	6th
2024	GT World Challenge Europe Sprint Cup	Liqui Moly Team Engstler by One Group	10	0	1	0	0	9.5	14th
2024	GT World Challenge Europe Sprint Cup – Gold	Liqui Moly Team Engstler by One Group	10	2	4	2	9	107.5	**1st**
2024	24 Hours of Nürburgring – SP11	Dörr Motorsport	1	1	0	0	1	—N/a	**1st**
2024	ADAC GT Masters	Wolf-Racing	2	0	0	0	0	0	NC†
2025	GT World Challenge Europe Endurance Cup	Tresor Attempto Racing	5	0	0	0	0	0	NC
2025	GT World Challenge Europe Endurance Cup – Bronze	Tresor Attempto Racing	5	0	1	1	1	21	20th
2025	Nürburgring Langstrecken-Serie – SP9 Pro	Eastalent Racing Team	2	0	0	0	0	3	NC
2025	24 Hours of Nürburgring – SP9 Pro	Eastalent Racing Team	1	0	0	0	0	—N/a	5th
2025–26	24H Series Middle East – GT3	Pure Rxcing	1	0	0	0	0	28	NC
2026	GT World Challenge Europe Endurance Cup	Pure Rxcing	5	0	0	0	0	0	NC
2026	GT World Challenge Europe Endurance Cup – Silver	Pure Rxcing	5	1	0	0	1	49	5th
2026	24 Hours of Nürburgring – SP9 Pro-Am	Lionspeed GP	1	0	0	0	1	—N/a	**2nd**
2026	Intercontinental GT Challenge	Lionspeed GP	1	0	0	0	0	4	28th
2026	Intercontinental GT Challenge	Pure Rxcing	1	0	0	0	0	4	28th

† As Hofer was a guest driver, he was ineligible for points

=== Complete ADAC Formula 4 Championship results ===
(key) (Races in bold indicate pole position; races in italics indicate fastest lap)

Year	Team	1	2	3	4	5	6	7	8	9	10	11	12	13	14	15	16	17	18	19	20	21	22	23	24	DC	Points
2015	Lechner Racing	OSC; 1	OSC; 2	OSC; 3	RBR; 1	RBR; 2	RBR; 3	SPA; 1	SPA; 2	SPA; 3	LAU; 1	LAU; 2	LAU; 3	NÜR; 1	NÜR; 2	NÜR; 3	SAC; 1	SAC; 2	SAC; 3	OSC; 1	OSC; 2	OSC; 3	HOC; 1 Ret	HOC; 2; 27	HOC; 3; 26	51st	0

=== Complete TCR ADAC Germany Touring Car Championship results ===
(key) (Races in bold indicate pole position) (Races in italics indicate fastest lap)

Year	Team	Car	1	2	3	4	5	6	7	8	9	10	11	12	13	14	DC	Points
2017	AC 1927 Mayen e.V. im ADAC	Audi RS3 LMS TCR	OSC; 1; 8	OSC; 2; 22	RBR; 1; 18	RBR; 2; 17	OSC; 1; 7	OSC; 2; 7	ZAN; 1; 14	ZAN; 2; 11	NÜR; 1; 10	NÜR; 2; 23	SAC; 1; 10	SAC; 2; 10	HOC; 1; 11	HOC; 2; 2	11th	177

=== Complete ADAC GT Masters results ===
(key) (Races in bold indicate pole position) (Races in italics indicate fastest lap)

Year	Team	Car	1	2	3	4	5	6	7	8	9	10	11	12	13	14	DC	Points
2018	Phoenix Racing	Audi R8 LMS Evo	**OSC**; **1**; 1	OSC; 2 Ret	MST; 1 Ret	MST; 2; 13	RBR; 1; 8	RBR; 2 Ret	NÜR; 1; 19	NÜR; 2; 11	ZAN; 1; 5	ZAN; 2; 12	SAC; 1; 11	SAC; 2; 11	HOC; 1; 23	HOC; 2; 19	16th	39
2019	Montaplast by Land-Motorsport	Audi R8 LMS Evo	OSC; 1; 7	OSC; 2; 20	MST; 1; 3	MST; 2; 25	RBR; 1; 6	RBR; 2; 6	ZAN; 1; 5	**ZAN**; **2**; 2	NÜR; 1; 5	NÜR; 2; 8	HOC; 1 Ret	HOC; 2; 17	SAC; 1; 2	SAC; 2; 3	4th	134
2020	Montaplast by Land-Motorsport	Audi R8 LMS Evo	LAU1; 1; 3	LAU1; 2; 14	NÜR; 1 Ret	NÜR; 2; 6	HOC; 1; 8	HOC; 2; 2	SAC; 1; 15	SAC; 2; 4	RBR; 1; 20	RBR; 2; 6	LAU2; 1; 1	LAU2; 2; 12	OSC; 1; 4	OSC; 2; 11	5th	127
2021	GRT Grasser Racing Team	Lamborghini Huracán GT3 Evo	OSC; 1	OSC; 2	RBR; 1; 14	RBR; 2 Ret	ZAN; 1	ZAN; 2	LAU; 1	LAU; 2	SAC; 1	SAC; 2	HOC; 1	HOC; 2	NÜR; 1	NÜR; 2	42nd	2
2024	Wolf-Racing	Audi R8 LMS Evo II	OSC; 1	OSC; 2	ZAN; 1	ZAN; 2	NÜR; 1	NÜR; 2	SPA; 1	SPA; 2	RBR; 1	RBR; 2	HOC; 1; 19	HOC; 2; 16			NC†	0

† As Hofer was a guest driver, he was ineligible for points

=== Complete GT World Challenge results ===
==== GT World Challenge Europe Endurance Cup ====
(Races in bold indicate pole position) (Races in italics indicate fastest lap)

Year	Team	Car	Class	1	2	3	4	5	6	7	Pos.	Points
2021	Attempto Racing	Audi R8 LMS Evo	Silver	MNZ	LEC; 18	SPA; 6H; 28	SPA; 12H; 23	SPA; 24H; 15	NÜR; 9	CAT; 15	4th	65
2023	Comtoyou Racing	Audi R8 LMS Evo II	Gold	MNZ; 7	LEC; 9	SPA; 6H; 34	SPA; 12H; 26	SPA; 24H; 21	NÜR	CAT; 35	2nd	94
2024	Tresor Attempto Racing	Audi R8 LMS Evo II	Bronze	LEC; Ret	SPA; 6H; 29	SPA; 12H; 3	SPA; 24H; 10	NÜR; Ret	MNZ; 11	JED; Ret	6th	53
2025	Tresor Attempto Racing	Audi R8 LMS Evo II	Bronze	LEC; 50	MNZ; Ret	SPA; 6H; 51	SPA; 12H; 63†	SPA; 24H; Ret	NÜR; 40	CAT; 15	20th	21
2026	Pure Rxcing	Porsche 911 GT3 R (992.2)	Silver	LEC; 17	MNZ; 37†	SPA; 6H; 31	SPA; 12H; 58†	SPA; 24H; Ret	NÜR; 22	ALG; Ret	5th	49

^{*}Season still in progress.

^{†} Did not finish, but was classified as he had completed more than 90% of the race distance.

==== Complete GT World Challenge Europe Sprint Cup results ====
(key) (Races in bold indicate pole position; results in italics indicate fastest lap)

Year	Team	Car	Class	1	2	3	4	5	6	7	8	9	10	Pos.	Points
2021	Attempto Racing	Audi R8 LMS Evo	Pro	MAG; 1	MAG; 2	ZAN; 1	ZAN; 2	MIS; 1	MIS; 2	BRH; 1; 15	BRH; 2; 14	VAL; 1	VAL; 2	NC	0
2024	LIQUI MOLY Team Engstler by OneGroup	Audi R8 LMS Evo II	Gold	BRH; 1; 7	BRH; 2; 10	MIS; 1; 21	MIS; 2; 15			**MAG**; **1**; 13	**MAG**; **2**; 19	CAT; 1; 7	CAT; 2; 10	1st	107.5
2024	LIQUI MOLY Team Engstler by OneGroup	Lamborghini Huracán GT3 Evo 2	Gold					**HOC**; **1**; 6	**HOC**; **2**; 13					1st	107.5
