= 2021 ADAC GT Masters =

Motorsport season

The 2021 ADAC GT Masters was the fifteenth season of the ADAC GT Masters, the grand tourer-style sports car racing founded by the German automobile club ADAC.

Montaplast drivers Ricardo Feller and Christopher Mies won the title in a closely-fought battle with SSR Performance's Michael Ammermüller and Mathieu Jaminet.

== Calendar ==
The round at Nürburgring planned in 6-7 August was postponed after massive flooding in Germany. The new date was set to 6-7 November, making it the series finale.

Round	Circuit	Location	Race 1	Race 2
1	(Germany) Motorsport Arena Oschersleben	Oschersleben, Saxony-Anhalt	15 May	16 May
2	(Austria) Red Bull Ring	Spielberg, Styria	12 June	13 June
3	(Netherlands) Circuit Zandvoort	Zandvoort, North Holland	10 July	11 July
4	(Germany) Lausitzring (Sprint Circuit)	Klettwitz, Brandenburg	11 September	12 September
5	(Germany) Sachsenring	Hohenstein-Ernstthal, Saxony	2 October	3 October
6	(Germany) Hockenheimring	Hockenheim, Baden-Württemberg	23 October	24 October
7	(Germany) Nürburgring (Sprint Circuit)	Nürburg, Rhineland-Palatinate	6 November	7 November

== Entry list ==
Team	Car	No.	Driver	Class	Rounds
(Germany) Aust Motorsport	Audi R8 LMS Evo	3	(Germany) Sebastian Asch		All
(Germany) Aust Motorsport	Audi R8 LMS Evo	3	(Germany) Daniel Keilwitz		All
(Germany) Phoenix Racing	Audi R8 LMS Evo	4	(Switzerland) Patric Niederhauser		All
(Germany) Phoenix Racing	Audi R8 LMS Evo	4	(Germany) Jusuf Owega	J	All
(Germany) Phoenix Racing	Audi R8 LMS Evo	5	(Germany) Salman Owega		7
(Germany) Phoenix Racing	Audi R8 LMS Evo	5	(Italy) Mattia Drudi		7
(Germany) Precote Herberth Motorsport	Porsche 911 GT3 R	7	(Austria) Klaus Bachler		All
(Germany) Precote Herberth Motorsport	Porsche 911 GT3 R	7	(Switzerland) Simona de Silvestro		All
(Germany) Precote Herberth Motorsport	Porsche 911 GT3 R	99	(Germany) Sven Müller		All
(Germany) Precote Herberth Motorsport	Porsche 911 GT3 R	99	(Germany) Robert Renauer		All
(Germany) Schubert Motorsport	BMW M6 GT3	10	(Finland) Jesse Krohn		All
(Germany) Schubert Motorsport	BMW M6 GT3	10	(United Kingdom) Nick Yelloly		All
(Germany) Rutronik Racing by TECE	Audi R8 LMS Evo	11	(Germany) Elia Erhart	T	All
(Germany) Rutronik Racing by TECE	Audi R8 LMS Evo	11	(Germany) Pierre Kaffer		1–4, 6–7
(Germany) Rutronik Racing by TECE	Audi R8 LMS Evo	11	(Italy) Mattia Drudi		5
(Germany) Rutronik Racing by TECE	Audi R8 LMS Evo	33	(Germany) Dennis Marschall	J	All
(Germany) Rutronik Racing by TECE	Audi R8 LMS Evo	33	(Germany) Kim-Luis Schramm	J	All
(Germany) Team Zakspeed Mobil Krankenkasse Racing	Mercedes-AMG GT3 Evo	13	(France) Jules Gounon		All
(Germany) Team Zakspeed Mobil Krankenkasse Racing	Mercedes-AMG GT3 Evo	13	(Poland) Igor Waliłko	J	All
(Germany) Team Zakspeed Mobil Krankenkasse Racing	Mercedes-AMG GT3 Evo	20	(Austria) Constantin Schöll	J	All
(Germany) Team Zakspeed Mobil Krankenkasse Racing	Mercedes-AMG GT3 Evo	20	(Germany) Hendrik Still		All
(Germany) MRS GT-Racing	Porsche 911 GT3 R	14	(Germany) Maximilian Hackländer		1–6
(Germany) MRS GT-Racing	Porsche 911 GT3 R	14	(Austria) Mick Wishofer	J	1–4
(Germany) MRS GT-Racing	Porsche 911 GT3 R	14	(Sweden) Erik Johansson	J	5
(Germany) MRS GT-Racing	Porsche 911 GT3 R	14	(Austria) Martin Ragginger		6
(Austria) GRT Grasser Racing Team	Lamborghini Huracán GT3 Evo	16	(Germany) Mike David Ortmann	J	All
(Austria) GRT Grasser Racing Team	Lamborghini Huracán GT3 Evo	16	(Austria) Clemens Schmid		All
(Austria) GRT Grasser Racing Team	Lamborghini Huracán GT3 Evo	19	(Switzerland) Rolf Ineichen	T	All
(Austria) GRT Grasser Racing Team	Lamborghini Huracán GT3 Evo	19	(France) Franck Perera		All
(Austria) GRT Grasser Racing Team	Lamborghini Huracán GT3 Evo	63	(Italy) Mirko Bortolotti		All
(Austria) GRT Grasser Racing Team	Lamborghini Huracán GT3 Evo	63	(Spain) Albert Costa		1–5
(Austria) GRT Grasser Racing Team	Lamborghini Huracán GT3 Evo	63	(Italy) Marco Mapelli		6–7
(Austria) GRT Grasser Racing Team	Lamborghini Huracán GT3 Evo	82	(Germany) Tim Zimmermann		1–3, 5–7
(Austria) GRT Grasser Racing Team	Lamborghini Huracán GT3 Evo	82	(Netherlands) Steijn Schothorst		1
(Austria) GRT Grasser Racing Team	Lamborghini Huracán GT3 Evo	82	(Austria) Max Hofer		2
(Austria) GRT Grasser Racing Team	Lamborghini Huracán GT3 Evo	82	(Italy) Marco Mapelli		3
(Austria) GRT Grasser Racing Team	Lamborghini Huracán GT3 Evo	82	(Germany) Hugo Sasse	J	5–7
(Germany) PROsport Racing	Aston Martin Vantage AMR GT3	17	(Germany) Salman Owega		6
(Germany) PROsport Racing	Aston Martin Vantage AMR GT3	17	(Germany) Tim Heinemann		6
(Germany) BWT Toksport WRT	Mercedes-AMG GT3 Evo	22	(Germany) Maro Engel		All
(Germany) BWT Toksport WRT	Mercedes-AMG GT3 Evo	22	(Germany) Luca Stolz		All
(Germany) Montaplast by Land-Motorsport	Audi R8 LMS Evo	28	(Germany) Christopher Haase		All
(Germany) Montaplast by Land-Motorsport	Audi R8 LMS Evo	28	(Germany) Luca-Sandro Trefz	J	All
(Germany) Montaplast by Land-Motorsport	Audi R8 LMS Evo	29	(Switzerland) Ricardo Feller	J	All
(Germany) Montaplast by Land-Motorsport	Audi R8 LMS Evo	29	(Germany) Christopher Mies		All
(Belgium) Team WRT	Audi R8 LMS Evo	32	(Belgium) Dries Vanthoor		All
(Belgium) Team WRT	Audi R8 LMS Evo	32	(Belgium) Charles Weerts	J	1, 3–7
(Belgium) Team WRT	Audi R8 LMS Evo	32	(Denmark) Dennis Lind		2
(Germany) YACO Racing	Audi R8 LMS Evo	54	(Austria) Simon Reicher	J	1–6
(Germany) YACO Racing	Audi R8 LMS Evo	54	(Austria) Norbert Siedler		1–6
(Germany) Car Collection Motorsport	Audi R8 LMS Evo	69	(Germany) Florian Spengler	T	All
(Germany) Car Collection Motorsport	Audi R8 LMS Evo	69	(Germany) Markus Winkelhock		All
(United States) Mann-Filter Team Landgraf-HTP WWR	Mercedes-AMG GT3 Evo	70	(Germany) Maximilian Buhk		All
(United States) Mann-Filter Team Landgraf-HTP WWR	Mercedes-AMG GT3 Evo	70	(Italy) Raffaele Marciello		All
(Germany) T3 Motorsport	Lamborghini Huracán GT3 Evo	71	(Germany) Maximilian Paul	J	All
(Germany) T3 Motorsport	Lamborghini Huracán GT3 Evo	71	(Germany) Hugo Sasse	J	1–4
(Germany) T3 Motorsport	Lamborghini Huracán GT3 Evo	71	(Italy) Marco Mapelli		5
(Germany) T3 Motorsport	Lamborghini Huracán GT3 Evo	71	(Italy) Luca Ghiotto		6–7
(Germany) KÜS Team Bernhard	Porsche 911 GT3 R	74	(Germany) Jannes Fittje	J	1–3
(Germany) KÜS Team Bernhard	Porsche 911 GT3 R	74	(Luxembourg) Dylan Pereira	J	1, 3–6
(Germany) KÜS Team Bernhard	Porsche 911 GT3 R	74	(Norway) Dennis Olsen		2
(Germany) KÜS Team Bernhard	Porsche 911 GT3 R	74	(Sweden) Joel Eriksson		4–7
(Germany) KÜS Team Bernhard	Porsche 911 GT3 R	74	(Germany) Marco Holzer		7
(Germany) KÜS Team Bernhard	Porsche 911 GT3 R	75	(Germany) Christian Engelhart		All
(Germany) KÜS Team Bernhard	Porsche 911 GT3 R	75	(Austria) Thomas Preining		All
(Germany) Callaway Competition	Corvette C7 GT3-R	77	(Germany) Marvin Kirchhöfer		All
(Germany) Callaway Competition	Corvette C7 GT3-R	77	(Switzerland) Jeffrey Schmidt		All
(Germany) Team Joos Sportwagentechnik	Porsche 911 GT3 R	91	(Germany) David Jahn		All
(Germany) Team Joos Sportwagentechnik	Porsche 911 GT3 R	91	(Germany) Marco Holzer		1–3
(Germany) Team Joos Sportwagentechnik	Porsche 911 GT3 R	91	(Germany) Jannes Fittje	J	4–7
(Germany) SSR Performance	Porsche 911 GT3 R	92	(Germany) Michael Ammermüller		All
(Germany) SSR Performance	Porsche 911 GT3 R	92	(France) Mathieu Jaminet		All

== Race results ==
Round		Circuit	Pole position	Fastest lap	Winning drivers	Winning car
1	R1	(Germany) Motorsport Arena Oschersleben	(Germany) Maximilian Buhk (Italy) Raffaele Marciello	(Italy) Mirko Bortolotti	(Germany) Maximilian Buhk (Italy) Raffaele Marciello	Mercedes-AMG GT3 Evo
1	R2	(Germany) Motorsport Arena Oschersleben	(Germany) Michael Ammermüller (France) Mathieu Jaminet	(Switzerland) Ricardo Feller	(Germany) Michael Ammermüller (France) Mathieu Jaminet	Porsche 911 GT3 R
2	R1	(Austria) Red Bull Ring	(Italy) Mirko Bortolotti (Spain) Albert Costa Balboa	(Italy) Raffaele Marciello	(Germany) Michael Ammermüller (France) Mathieu Jaminet	Porsche 911 GT3 R
2	R2	(Austria) Red Bull Ring	(Germany) Dennis Marschall (Germany) Kim Luis Schramm	(Belgium) Dries Vanthoor	(Germany) Marvin Kirchhöfer (Switzerland) Jeffrey Schmidt	Corvette C7 GT3-R
3	R1	(Netherlands) Circuit Zandvoort	(Switzerland) Ricardo Feller (Germany) Christopher Mies	(Switzerland) Ricardo Feller	(Switzerland) Ricardo Feller (Germany) Christopher Mies	Audi R8 LMS Evo
3	R2	(Netherlands) Circuit Zandvoort	(Belgium) Dries Vanthoor (Belgium) Charles Weerts	(Belgium) Dries Vanthoor	(Belgium) Dries Vanthoor (Belgium) Charles Weerts	Audi R8 LMS Evo
4	R1	(Germany) Lausitzring	(Switzerland) Ricardo Feller (Germany) Christopher Mies	(Switzerland) Ricardo Feller	(Switzerland) Ricardo Feller (Germany) Christopher Mies	Audi R8 LMS Evo
4	R2	(Germany) Lausitzring	(France) Jules Gounon (Poland) Igor Waliłko	(France) Jules Gounon	(France) Jules Gounon (Poland) Igor Waliłko	Mercedes-AMG GT3 Evo
5	R1	(Germany) Sachsenring	(Germany) Michael Ammermüller (France) Mathieu Jaminet	(France) Mathieu Jaminet	(Germany) Michael Ammermüller (France) Mathieu Jaminet	Porsche 911 GT3 R
5	R2	(Germany) Sachsenring	(France) Jules Gounon (Poland) Igor Waliłko	(France) Jules Gounon	(France) Jules Gounon (Poland) Igor Waliłko	Mercedes-AMG GT3 Evo
6	R1	(Germany) Hockenheimring	(Italy) Mirko Bortolotti (Italy) Marco Mapelli	(Germany) Christian Engelhart	(Italy) Mirko Bortolotti (Italy) Marco Mapelli	Lamborghini Huracán GT3 Evo
6	R2	(Germany) Hockenheimring	(Switzerland) Rolf Ineichen (France) Franck Perera	(France) Franck Perera	(Switzerland) Rolf Ineichen (France) Franck Perera	Lamborghini Huracán GT3 Evo
7	R1	(Germany) Nürburgring	(Switzerland) Ricardo Feller (Germany) Christopher Mies	(Switzerland) Ricardo Feller	(Switzerland) Ricardo Feller (Germany) Christopher Mies	Audi R8 LMS Evo
7	R2	(Germany) Nürburgring	(Austria) Klaus Bachler (Switzerland) Simona de Silvestro	(France) Mathieu Jaminet	(Germany) Michael Ammermüller (France) Mathieu Jaminet	Porsche 911 GT3 R

== Championship standings ==
=== Points system ===
Points were awarded to the top 15 classified finishers in each race.

Platz	1st	2nd	3rd	4th	5th	6th	7th	8th	9th	10th	11th	12th	13th	14th	15th
Punkte	25	20	16	13	11	10	9	8	7	6	5	4	3	2	1

=== Drivers' standings ===
Pos.	Fahrer	OSC (Germany)		RBR (Austria)		ZAN (Netherlands)		LAU (Germany)		SAC (Germany)		HOC (Germany)		NÜR (Germany)		Points
1	(Switzerland) Ricardo Feller	3	5	12	7	1	Ret	1	6	3	5	2	7	1	10	199
1	(Germany) Christopher Mies	3	5	12	7	1	Ret	1	6	3	5	2	7	1	10	199
2	(Germany) Michael Ammermüller	7	1	1	6	6	18	13	12	1	10	3	8	2	1	195
2	(France) Mathieu Jaminet	7	1	1	6	6	18	13	12	1	10	3	8	2	1	195
3	(Germany) Maro Engel	5	7	10	Ret	2	16	2	2	2	2	4	3	4	Ret	176
3	(Germany) Luca Stolz	5	7	10	Ret	2	16	2	2	2	2	4	3	4	Ret	176
4	(Germany) Maximilian Buhk	1	Ret	4	10	9	2	4	3	4	Ret	20	2	5	19	150
4	(Italy) Raffaele Marciello	1	Ret	4	10	9	2	4	3	4	Ret	20	2	5	19	150
5	(Italy) Mirko Bortolotti	2	Ret	2	4	12	10	3	5	Ret	11	1	19	Ret	4	145
6	(France) Jules Gounon	15	4	13	8	8	5	Ret	1	9	1	10	5	19	6	136
6	(Poland) Igor Waliłko	15	4	13	8	8	5	Ret	1	9	1	10	5	19	6	136
7	(Switzerland) Rolf Ineichen	18	Ret	7	5	17	3	8	7	Ret	4	6	1	7	3	135
7	(France) Franck Perera	18	Ret	7	5	17	3	8	7	Ret	4	6	1	7	3	135
8	(Finland) Jesse Krohn	4	2	Ret	3	3	Ret	7	11	10	DSQ	22	Ret	9	8	104
8	(United Kingdom) Nick Yelloly	4	2	Ret	3	3	Ret	7	11	10	DSQ	22	Ret	9	8	104
9	(Spain) Albert Costa Balboa	2	Ret	2	4	12	10	3	5	Ret	11					103
10	(Germany) Marvin Kirchhöfer	13	Ret	3	1	7	4	Ret	25	14	9	11	9	13	13	95
10	(Switzerland) Jeffrey Schmidt	13	Ret	3	1	7	4	Ret	25	14	9	11	9	13	13	95
11	(Germany) Dennis Marschall	6	Ret	8	2	10	6	14	8	12	19	14	18	8	12	85
11	(Germany) Kim-Luis Schramm	6	Ret	8	2	10	6	14	8	12	19	14	18	8	12	85
12	(Belgium) Dries Vanthoor	11	12	5	15	5	1	Ret	24	6	Ret	23	Ret	10	Ret	79
13	(Germany) Christian Engelhart	26	8	11	17	Ret	Ret	Ret	15	5	3	12	4	3	Ret	74
13	(Austria) Thomas Preining	26	8	11	17	Ret	Ret	Ret	15	5	3	12	4	3	Ret	74
14	(Belgium) Charles Weerts	11	12			5	1	Ret	24	6	Ret	23	Ret	10	Ret	66
15	(Germany) David Jahn	8	10	6	9	13	20	6	17	Ret	Ret	7	10	17	Ret	61
16	(Germany) Marco Holzer	8	10	6	9	13	20							14	2	58
17	(Sweden) Joel Eriksson							9	4	11	Ret	Ret	6	14	2	57
18	(Switzerland) Patric Niederhauser	10	18	15	12	22	9	Ret	16	22	6	5	Ret	12	5	54
18	(Germany) Jusuf Owega	10	18	15	12	22	9	Ret	16	22	6	5	Ret	12	5	54
19	(Italy) Marco Mapelli					Ret	19			8	15	1	19	Ret	4	51
20	(Germany) Sven Müller	9	9	9	Ret	4	Ret	17	13	18	12	Ret	Ret	Ret	11	46
20	(Germany) Robert Renauer	9	9	9	Ret	4	Ret	17	13	18	12	Ret	Ret	Ret	11	46
21	(Germany) Jannes Fittje	12	14	Ret	Ret	14	12	6	17	Ret	Ret	7	10	17	Ret	37
22	(Germany) Maximilian Paul	20	15	18	18	15	21	11	Ret	8	15	Ret	12	6	8	37
23	(Austria) Klaus Bachler	21	6	20	Ret	Ret	13	19	19	7	Ret	18	24	18	7	34
23	(Switzerland) Simona de Silvestro	21	6	20	Ret	Ret	13	19	19	7	Ret	18	24	18	7	34
24	(Austria) Clemens Schmid	25	16	17	11	18	14	5	14	15	13	13	13	16	14	31
24	(Germany) Mike David Ortmann	25	16	17	11	18	14	5	14	15	13	13	13	16	14	31
25	(Germany) Markus Winkelhock	17	Ret	Ret	14	11	7	16	23	17	7	21	14	22	15	29
25	(Germany) Florian Spengler	17	Ret	Ret	14	11	7	16	23	17	7	21	14	22	15	29
26	(Germany) Luca-Sandro Trefz	24	13	21	13	23	8	Ret	9	21	17	9	23	20	16	28
26	(Germany) Christopher Haase	24	13	21	13	23	8	Ret	9	21	17	9	23	20	16	28
27	(Luxembourg) Dylan Pereira	12	14			14	12			11	Ret	Ret	6			27
28	(Italy) Luca Ghiotto											Ret	12	6	8	21
29	(France) Julien Andlauer							9	4							20
30	(Germany) Maximilian Hackländer	19	3	19	Ret	19	Ret	18	18	13	16	24	20			19
31	(Germany) Elia Erhart	Ret	19	16	Ret	16	Ret	10	21	20	8	19	22	11	Ret	19
32	(Germany) Hugo Sasse	20	15	18	18	15	21	11	Ret	19	14	8	16	Ret	Ret	17
33	(Austria) Mick Wishofer	19	3	19	Ret	19	Ret	18	18							16
34	(Germany) Daniel Keilwitz	16	17	22	19	Ret	17	12	10	Ret	DNS	16	11	21	17	15
34	(Germany) Sebastian Asch	16	17	22	19	Ret	17	12	10	Ret	DNS	16	11	21	17	15
35	(Germany) Tim Zimmermann	14	21	14	Ret	Ret	19			19	14	8	16	Ret	Ret	14
36	(Denmark) Dennis Lind			5	15											13
37	(Austria) Simon Reicher	22	11	Ret	16	21	11	Ret	22	23	18	15	15			12
37	(Austria) Norbert Siedler	22	11	Ret	16	21	11	Ret	22	23	18	15	15			12
38	(Germany) Pierre Kaffer	Ret	19	16	Ret	16	Ret	10	21			19	22	11	Ret	11
39	(Italy) Mattia Drudi									20	8			DNS	DNS	8
40	(Sweden) Erik Johansson									13	16					3
41	(Germany) Hendrik Still	23	20	Ret	Ret	20	15	15	20	16	Ret	Ret	17	15	18	3
41	(Austria) Constantin Schöll	23	20	Ret	Ret	20	15	15	20	16	Ret	Ret	17	15	18	3
42	(Austria) Max Hofer			14	Ret											2
42	(Netherlands) Steijn Schothorst	14	21													2
43	(Austria) Martin Ragginger											24	20			0
44	(Norway) Dennis Olsen			Ret	Ret											0
Guest drivers ineligible to score points
	(Germany) Salman Owega											17	21	DNS	DNS	0
	(Germany) Tim Heinemann											17	21			0
Pos.	Fahrer	OSC (Germany)		RBR (Austria)		ZAN (Netherlands)		LAU (Germany)		SAC (Germany)		HOC (Germany)		NÜR (Germany)		Points

== Bibliography ==
- Tim Upietz; Oliver Runschke (2021). ADAC GT Masters Jahrbuch 2021 (in German). Duisburg: Gruppe C Motorsport Verlag. p. 224. ISBN 978-3-948501-17-4.
