= ADAC Formula 4 =

FIA Formula 4-regulated racing series

- Category: FIA Formula 4
- Country: Germany
- Region: Europe
- Inaugural season: 2015
- Folded: 2022
- Constructors: Tatuus
- Engine suppliers: Abarth
- Tyre suppliers: Pirelli
- Last Drivers' champion: (Italy) Andrea Kimi Antonelli
- Last Teams' champion: (Italy) Prema Racing
- Official website: Official website

ADAC Formula 4 (German: ADAC Formel 4) was a racing series regulated according to FIA Formula 4 regulations, and promoted by the German automobile club ADAC. The inaugural season was the 2015 ADAC Formula 4. It replaced the ADAC Formel Masters, held from 2008 to 2014. The series was discontinued after the 2022 season. Its final two champions, Oliver Bearman and Kimi Antonelli, went on to race in Formula One.

In 2027, a new series, to be called the F4 German Championship, was established under the organisation of Gedlich Racing.

== History ==
Gerhard Berger and the FIA Single Seater Commission launched the FIA Formula 4 in March 2013. The goal of Formula 4 was to make the ladder to Formula One more transparent. Besides sporting and technical regulations, costs were regulated too. A car to compete in this category could not exceed a price of €30,000. A single season in Formula 4 could not exceed €100,000 in costs. ADAC F4 was one of the second phase Formula 4 championships to be launched. The first phase championships were the Italian F4 Championship and Formula 4 Sudamericana which started in 2014. The ADAC championship was launched by the ADAC on 16 July 2014. Italian race car constructor Tatuus was contracted to design and build all the cars.

After the end of the 2022 season, which was understaffed by drivers, there was a long wait for the publication of a racing calendar for 2023. This, together with the rumors about the takeover of the DTM by the ADAC, which was also carried out on 2 December 2022, gave rise to speculation that the championship would not be continued. On 3 December, ADAC announced that ADAC Formula 4 would no longer be advertised for the 2023 season. The high costs compared to other national Formula 4 championships and the low number of drivers are given as reasons for the end of the championship. Only eleven drivers were registered for the last race at the Nürburgring in mid-October, while a week later a total of 41 drivers started at the last race of the Italian F4 race in Scarperia e San Piero.

Formula 4 is set to return to Germany in 2027 with the F4 German Championship. The series will be FIA-certified once again and will be promoted by Gedlich Racing instead of the ADAC.

== Car ==
The championship features Tatuus designed and built cars. The cars are constructed out of carbon fibre and feature a monocoque chassis. The engine is a 1.4L turbo Abarth. This is the same engine as in the Italian F4 Championship.

== Champions ==
=== Drivers ===
Season	Driver	Team	Poles	Wins	Podiums	Fastest laps	Points	% points achievable	Clinched	Margin
2015	(Germany) Marvin Dienst	(Germany) HTP Junior Team	7	8	14	6	347	57.833	Race 22 of 24	48
2016	(Australia) Joey Mawson	(Netherlands) Van Amersfoort Racing	7	10	16	5	374	63.660	Race 22 of 24	52
2017	(Estonia) Jüri Vips	(Italy) Prema Powerteam	0	2	7	0	245.5	47.902	Race 21 of 21	4.5
2018	(Germany) Lirim Zendeli	(Germany) US Racing– CHRS	8	10	13	8	348	66.286	Race 18 of 21	114
2019	(France) Théo Pourchaire	(Germany) US Racing– CHRS	6	4	12	2	258	49.143	Race 21 of 21	7
2020	(United Kingdom) Jonny Edgar	(Netherlands) Van Amersfoort Racing	5	6	12	6	300	57.142	Race 21 of 21	2
2021	(United Kingdom) Oliver Bearman	(Netherlands) Van Amersfoort Racing	5	6	11	4	295	65.556	Race 18 of 18	26
2022	(Italy) Andrea Kimi Antonelli	(Italy) Prema Powerteam	7	9	12	8	313	83.466	Race 17 of 18	47

=== Teams ===
Season	Team	Poles	Wins	Podiums	Fastest laps	Points	Clinched	Margin
2016	(Italy) Prema Powerteam	4	4	17	3	459.5	Race 24 of 24	4.5
2017	(Italy) Prema Powerteam	2	5	20	2	597.5	Race 18 of 21	171
2018	(Germany) US Racing– CHRS	8	11	19	11	562	Race 21 of 21	41
2019	(Germany) US Racing– CHRS	7	7	27	7	528	Race 20 of 21	41
2020	(Netherlands) Van Amersfoort Racing	9	11	27	11	651	Race 20 of 21	41
2021	(Netherlands) Van Amersfoort Racing	5	8	22	5	295	Race 21 of 21	26
2022	(Italy) Prema Powerteam	9	12	34	13	594	Race 21 of 21	63

=== Rookies ===
The result of the championship was decided by different standings. Wins and points of the rookie standings are present in brackets.

Season	Driver	Team	Poles	Wins (rookie)	Podiums	Fastest laps	Points (rookie)	Clinched	Margin
2015	(Germany) David Beckmann	(Germany) ADAC Berlin-Brandenburg	0	1 (10)	4	1	166 (396)	Race 22 of 24	69
2016	(Denmark) Nicklas Nielsen	(Austria) Neuhauser Racing	0	0 (6)	3	1	106 (317)	Race 24 of 24	14
2017	(Austria) Mick Wishofer	(Austria) Lechner Racing	0	0 (11)	0	0	1 (383.5)	Race 19 of 21	72.5
2018	(Germany) David Schumacher	(Germany) US Racing– CHRS	0	0 (8)	0	0	103 (332)	Race 20 of 21	31
2019	(Czech Republic) Roman Staněk	(Germany) US Racing– CHRS	0	2 (10)	5	2	165 (412)	Race 18 of 21	89
2020	(Germany) Tim Tramnitz	(Germany) US Racing	0	1 (8)	6	0	226 (386)	Race 18 of 21	93
2021	(Russia) Nikita Bedrin	(Netherlands) Van Amersfoort Racing	0	2(11)	5	0	147 (362)	Race 21 of 21	23
2022	(Brazil) Rafael Câmara	(Italy) Prema Powerteam	2	1(11)	9	2	193 (285)	Race 18 of 18	16

== Drivers graduated to F1 ==
- **Bold** denotes a 2026 Formula One driver.
- Gold background denotes ADAC Formula 4 champion.

Driver	ADAC Formula 4				Formula One				
Driver	Seasons	Races	Wins	Podiums	Seasons	First team	Races	Wins	Podiums
(Italy) **Kimi Antonelli**	2022	15	9	12	2025–2026	Mercedes	45	9	19
(United Kingdom) **Oliver Bearman**	2020–2021	39	7	14	2024–2026	Ferrari	48	0	0
(Australia) Jack Doohan	2018	8	0	0	2024–2025	Alpine	7	0	0
(New Zealand) **Liam Lawson**	2018	20	3	9	2023–2026	AlphaTauri	56	0	0
(United Kingdom) **Lando Norris**	2015	8	1	6	2019–2026	McLaren	172	14	51
(Germany) Mick Schumacher	2015–2016	46	6	14	2021–2022	Haas	43	0	0
(China) Guanyu Zhou	2015	9	0	2	2022–2024	Alfa Romeo	68	0	0

== Circuits ==
Number	Circuits	Rounds	Years
1	(Germany) Hockenheimring	12 (Note: Hockenheimring hosted 3 rounds in 2018, 2 rounds in 2019 and 2021.)	2015–2022
2	(Germany) Nürburgring	10 (Note: Nürburgring hosted 2 rounds in 2020, 2022.)	2015–2022
3	(Germany) Motorsport Arena Oschersleben	9 (Note: Motorsport Arena Oschersleben hosted 2 rounds in 2015–2017.)	2015–2020
4	(Austria) Red Bull Ring	7	2015–2021
4	(Germany) Lausitzring	7 (Note: Lausitzring hosted 2 rounds in 2020.)	2015–2018, 2020, 2022
6	(Germany) Sachsenring	5	2015–2017, 2019, 2021
7	(Netherlands) Circuit Park Zandvoort	4	2016, 2019, 2021–2022
8	(Belgium) Circuit de Spa-Francorchamps	2	2015, 2022
