= 2017 ADAC Formula 4 Championship =

Third season of the ADAC Formula 4

The 2017 ADAC Formula 4 Championship was the third season of the ADAC Formula 4. It began on 29 April at Oschersleben and finished on 24 September at Hockenheim after seven triple header rounds.

== Teams and drivers ==
In December 2016, ten teams and twenty eight cars were confirmed for the 2017 season:

Team	No.	Driver	Status	Rounds
(Netherlands) Van Amersfoort Racing	1	(Brazil) Felipe Drugovich		All
(Netherlands) Van Amersfoort Racing	2	(Denmark) Frederik Vesti		All
(Netherlands) Van Amersfoort Racing	3	(United Kingdom) Louis Gachot		All
(Netherlands) Van Amersfoort Racing	41	(Russia) Artem Petrov		6–7
(Netherlands) Van Amersfoort Racing	83	(Canada) Kami Moreira-Laliberté		1–5
(Germany) ADAC Berlin-Brandenburg	4	(Germany) Sophia Flörsch		All
(Germany) ADAC Berlin-Brandenburg	5	(Germany) Lirim Zendeli		All
(Germany) ADAC Berlin-Brandenburg	6	(Czech Republic) Tom Beckhäuser	R	All
(Germany) ADAC Berlin-Brandenburg	7	(Sweden) Oliver Söderström		All
(Germany) ADAC Berlin-Brandenburg	64	(United Kingdom) Olli Caldwell	G	4–5
(Italy) Prema Powerteam	9	(New Zealand) Marcus Armstrong		All
(Italy) Prema Powerteam	44	(Estonia) Jüri Vips		All
(Italy) Prema Powerteam	68	(United States) Juan Manuel Correa		1–5
(Italy) Prema Powerteam	74	(Brazil) Enzo Fittipaldi	G	5
(Austria) Lechner Racing	10	(Germany) Richard Wagner	R	All
(Austria) Lechner Racing	11	(Austria) Mick Wishofer	R	All
(Austria) Lechner Racing	12	(Russia) Artem Petrov	G	3
(Germany) US Racing	13	(Switzerland) Fabio Scherer		All
(Germany) US Racing	18	(Germany) Julian Hanses		All
(Germany) US Racing	27	(Denmark) Nicklas Nielsen		All
(Germany) US Racing	28	(Germany) Kim-Luis Schramm		All
(Switzerland) Jenzer Motorsport	15	(India) Kush Maini	G	3
(Switzerland) Jenzer Motorsport	16	(Netherlands) Job van Uitert	G	3
(Germany) Team Piro Sport Interdental	25	(Germany) Doureid Ghattas	R	2–7
(Germany) Team Piro Sport Interdental	98	(Germany) Cedric Piro		All
(Germany) Heinrich Motorsport	26	(Germany) Laurin Heinrich	R	1–3, 6
(Germany) Rennsport Rössler	26	(Germany) Laurin Heinrich	R	4–5
(Germany) Motopark	33	(South Africa) Jonathan Aberdein		All
(Germany) Motopark	42	(Netherlands) Leonard Hoogenboom		All
(Germany) Motopark	79	(Lithuania) David Malukas		1–4, 6–7
(Germany) Motopark	99	(Belgium) Charles Weerts	R	All
(Portugal) DR Formula	41	(Russia) Artem Petrov	G	5
(Austria) Neuhauser Racing	80	(Germany) Andreas Estner		All
(Austria) Neuhauser Racing	81	(Germany) Michael Waldherr		All
(Italy) Bhaitech Racing	96	(Italy) Lorenzo Colombo	G	3
(Italy) Bhaitech Racing	97	(Venezuela) Sebastián Fernández	G	3

Icon	Legend
R	Rookie
G	Guest drivers ineligible to score points

== Race calendar and results ==
All rounds, except the second Oschersleben round were part of ADAC GT Masters weekends.

Round		Circuit	Date	Pole position	Fastest lap	Winning driver	Winning team	Rookie winner
1	R1	(Germany) Motorsport Arena Oschersleben, Oschersleben	29 April	(Brazil) Felipe Drugovich	(Denmark) Nicklas Nielsen	(Estonia) Jüri Vips	(Italy) Prema Powerteam	(Belgium) Charles Weerts
1	R2	(Germany) Motorsport Arena Oschersleben, Oschersleben	29 April	(Denmark) Nicklas Nielsen	(Brazil) Felipe Drugovich	(Denmark) Nicklas Nielsen	(Germany) US Racing	(Austria) Mick Wishofer
1	R3	(Germany) Motorsport Arena Oschersleben, Oschersleben	30 April		(Germany) Lirim Zendeli	(Germany) Lirim Zendeli	(Germany) ADAC Berlin-Brandenburg	(Germany) Laurin Heinrich
2	R1	(Germany) Lausitzring, Klettwitz	20 May	(Germany) Kim-Luis Schramm	(Brazil) Felipe Drugovich	(Canada) Kami Laliberté	(Netherlands) Van Amersfoort Racing	(Belgium) Charles Weerts
2	R2	(Germany) Lausitzring, Klettwitz	20 May	(Germany) Julian Hanses	(Germany) Kim-Luis Schramm	(Brazil) Felipe Drugovich	(Netherlands) Van Amersfoort Racing	(Germany) Richard Wagner
2	R3	(Germany) Lausitzring, Klettwitz	21 May		(Denmark) Frederik Vesti	(Brazil) Felipe Drugovich	(Netherlands) Van Amersfoort Racing	(Germany) Doureid Ghattas
3	R1	(Austria) Red Bull Ring, Spielberg	10 June	(New Zealand) Marcus Armstrong	(Canada) Kami Laliberté	(New Zealand) Marcus Armstrong	(Italy) Prema Powerteam	(Austria) Mick Wishofer
3	R2	(Austria) Red Bull Ring, Spielberg	11 June	(New Zealand) Marcus Armstrong	(Switzerland) Fabio Scherer	(Brazil) Felipe Drugovich	(Netherlands) Van Amersfoort Racing	(Germany) Laurin Heinrich
3	R3	(Austria) Red Bull Ring, Spielberg	11 June		(New Zealand) Marcus Armstrong	(Estonia) Jüri Vips	(Italy) Prema Powerteam	(Germany) Laurin Heinrich
4	R1	(Germany) Motorsport Arena Oschersleben, Oschersleben	8 July	(Canada) Kami Laliberté	(South Africa) Jonathan Aberdein	(New Zealand) Marcus Armstrong	(Italy) Prema Powerteam	(Austria) Mick Wishofer
4	R2	(Germany) Motorsport Arena Oschersleben, Oschersleben	8 July	(Brazil) Felipe Drugovich	(Brazil) Felipe Drugovich	(Brazil) Felipe Drugovich	(Netherlands) Van Amersfoort Racing	(Austria) Mick Wishofer
4	R3	(Germany) Motorsport Arena Oschersleben, Oschersleben	9 July		(Denmark) Frederik Vesti	(Denmark) Frederik Vesti	(Netherlands) Van Amersfoort Racing	(Austria) Mick Wishofer
5	R1	(Germany) Nürburgring, Nürburg	5 August	(Germany) Lirim Zendeli	(Switzerland) Fabio Scherer	(Germany) Lirim Zendeli	(Germany) ADAC Berlin-Brandenburg	(Austria) Mick Wishofer
5	R2	(Germany) Nürburgring, Nürburg	6 August	(Brazil) Felipe Drugovich	(Brazil) Felipe Drugovich	(Brazil) Felipe Drugovich	(Netherlands) Van Amersfoort Racing	(Austria) Mick Wishofer
5	R3	(Germany) Nürburgring, Nürburg	6 August		(United States) Juan Manuel Correa	(New Zealand) Marcus Armstrong	(Italy) Prema Powerteam	(Austria) Mick Wishofer
6	R1	(Germany) Sachsenring, Chemnitz	16 September	(Germany) Julian Hanses	(Germany) Julian Hanses	(Germany) Julian Hanses	(Germany) US Racing	(Germany) Doureid Ghattas
6	R2	(Germany) Sachsenring, Chemnitz	17 September	(Germany) Julian Hanses	(Switzerland) Fabio Scherer	(Switzerland) Fabio Scherer	(Germany) US Racing	(Austria) Mick Wishofer
6	R3	(Germany) Sachsenring, Chemnitz	17 September		(Brazil) Felipe Drugovich	(Brazil) Felipe Drugovich	(Netherlands) Van Amersfoort Racing	(Czech Republic) Tom Beckhäuser
7	R1	(Germany) Hockenheimring, Hockenheim	23 September	(Germany) Lirim Zendeli	(Brazil) Felipe Drugovich	(Brazil) Felipe Drugovich	(Netherlands) Van Amersfoort Racing	(Austria) Mick Wishofer
7	R2	(Germany) Hockenheimring, Hockenheim	23 September	(Germany) Lirim Zendeli	(Germany) Sophia Flörsch	(Germany) Lirim Zendeli	(Germany) ADAC Berlin-Brandenburg	(Belgium) Charles Weerts
7	R3	(Germany) Hockenheimring, Hockenheim	24 September		(Germany) Sophia Flörsch	(Russia) Artem Petrov	(Netherlands) Van Amersfoort Racing	(Austria) Mick Wishofer

== Championship standings ==
Points were awarded to the top 10 classified finishers in each race. No points were awarded for pole position or fastest lap.

Position	**1st**	**2nd**	**3rd**	**4th**	**5th**	**6th**	**7th**	**8th**	**9th**	**10th**
Points	25	18	15	12	10	8	6	4	2	1

=== Drivers' Championship ===
For the second race in Nürburgring, only half points were awarded because of a red flag finish that was less than half of the race distance after Cedric Piro's crash.

Pos	Driver	OSC1 (Germany)			LAU (Germany)			RBR (Austria)			OSC2 (Germany)			NÜR (Germany)			SAC (Germany)			HOC (Germany)			Pts
1	(Estonia) Jüri Vips	1	4	5	2	3	Ret	4	5	1	6	6	3	5	3	4	5	7	4	8	6	3	245.5
2	(New Zealand) Marcus Armstrong	9	6	Ret	3	2	11	**1**	**3**	3	1	2	6	10	8	1	3	2	6	10	9	2	241
3	(Brazil) Felipe Drugovich	**21**	2	12	4	1	1	16	1	6	3	**1**	10	17	**1**	9	7	Ret	1	1	Ret	5	236.5
4	(Germany) Lirim Zendeli	7	9	1	7	9	Ret	7	Ret	5	11	11	7	**1**	2	6	20	6	8	**2**	**1**	Ret	164
5	(Switzerland) Fabio Scherer	4	3	8	DSQ	DSQ	DSQ	Ret	9	10	4	3	5	3	11	15	2	1	5	3	Ret	11	154.5
6	(Denmark) Nicklas Nielsen	2	**1**	9	DSQ	DSQ	DSQ	3	8	2	15	5	12	Ret	DNS	DNS	4	4	9	5	Ret	Ret	128
7	(Denmark) Frederik Vesti	14	Ret	14	5	6	2	21	13	9	9	12	1	7	10	23	8	5	3	4	19	Ret	113
8	(Germany) Kim-Luis Schramm	11	22	6	**DSQ**	DSQ	DSQ	8	14	7	7	9	4	2	6	5	9	Ret	14	7	4	9	95
9	(South Africa) Jonathan Aberdein	3	8	3	Ret	13	Ret	14	4	12	2	7	9	Ret	9	16	13	9	16	Ret	2	17	94
10	(United States) Juan Manuel Correa	5	5	4	Ret	5	8	11	2	Ret	19	4	17	13	15	7							86
11	(Germany) Julian Hanses	6	12	7	DSQ	**DSQ**	DSQ	13	10	8	27	15	19	9	5	2	**1**	**Ret**	Ret	16	5	13	82
12	(Canada) Kami Moreira-Laliberté	10	7	Ret	1	4	Ret	5	7	4	**12**	24	8	Ret	17	DNS							76
13	(Germany) Sophia Flörsch	15	13	22	Ret	7	6	18	Ret	19	8	10	Ret	19	12	11	6	3	7	DNS	3	7	71
14	(Germany) Michael Waldherr	20	Ret	23	11	Ret	5	2	6	14	10	8	2	15	14	23	15	8	11	Ret	Ret	20	63
15	(Russia) Artem Petrov							Ret	DNS	DNS				12	22	10	10	16	2	6	8	1	56
16	(United Kingdom) Louis Gachot	13	19	13	8	11	3	Ret	17	18	17	23	13	6	13	8	22	13	12	11	7	4	51
17	(Germany) Andreas Estner	17	16	10	12	20	4	20	Ret	11	13	18	14	4	4	12	11	10	15	14	11	18	33
18	(Sweden) Oliver Söderström	8	21	2	13	Ret	10	Ret	16	17	16	14	16	16	18	13	Ret	17	Ret	15	12	8	27
19	(Lithuania) David Malukas	18	10	20	10	10	9	10	Ret	13	5	Ret	11				16	14	10	17	Ret	16	20
20	(Germany) Cedric Piro	23	Ret	15	6	19	16	Ret	15	Ret	20	13	20	11	16	DNS	14	Ret	13	9	14	6	19
21	(Netherlands) Leonard Hoogenboom	16	11	11	15	8	7	Ret	Ret	Ret	21	17	21	14	20	19	12	12	Ret	13	15	19	10
22	(Belgium) Charles Weerts	12	15	18	9	16	13	17	Ret	23	18	22	18	21	23	18	Ret	15	18	21	10	12	3
23	(Austria) Mick Wishofer	19	14	19	14	17	Ret	15	Ret	20	14	16	15	18	19	14	21	11	19	12	13	10	1
24	(Germany) Doureid Ghattas				16	18	12	DSQ	DNS	22	25	19	24	24	26	22	17	18	20	Ret	18	15	0
25	(Germany) Richard Wagner	22	17	17	17	12	Ret	19	19	21	24	20	Ret	23	25	21	19	19	21	19	17	Ret	0
26	(Czech Republic) Tom Beckhäuser	Ret	20	21	18	14	15	Ret	Ret	Ret	26	21	Ret	25	27	20	18	Ret	17	18	16	14	0
27	(Germany) Laurin Heinrich	24	18	16	Ret	15	14	Ret	18	16	22	25	23	22	24	24	Ret	DNS	DNS				0
**Guest drivers ineligible to score points**
-	(Brazil) Enzo Fittipaldi													8	7	3							0
-	(Italy) Lorenzo Colombo							6	11	Ret													0
-	(India) Kush Maini							9	20	Ret													0
-	(Venezuela) Sebastián Fernández							Ret	12	15													0
-	(Netherlands) Job van Uitert							12	Ret	Ret													0
-	(United Kingdom) Olli Caldwell										23	26	22	20	21	17							0
Pos	Driver	OSC1 (Germany)			LAU (Germany)			RBR (Austria)			OSC2 (Germany)			NÜR (Germany)			SAC (Germany)			HOC (Germany)			Pts

Colour	Result
Gold	Winner
Silver	Second place
Bronze	Third place
Green	Points classification
Blue	Non-points classification
Blue	Non-classified finish (NC)
Purple	Retired, not classified (Ret)
Red	Did not qualify (DNQ)
Red	Did not pre-qualify (DNPQ)
Black	Disqualified (DSQ)
White	Did not start (DNS)
White	Withdrew (WD)
White	Race cancelled (C)
Blank	Did not practice (DNP)
Blank	Did not arrive (DNA)
Blank	Excluded (EX)

**Bold** – Pole
Italics – Fastest Lap

=== Rookies' Championship ===
Pos	Driver	OSC1 (Germany)			LAU (Germany)			RBR (Austria)			OSC2 (Germany)			NÜR (Germany)			SAC (Germany)			HOC (Germany)			Pts
1	(Austria) Mick Wishofer	19	14	19	14	17	Ret	15	Ret	20	14	16	15	18	19	14	21	11	19	12	13	10	383.5
2	(Belgium) Charles Weerts	12	15	18	9	16	13	17	Ret	23	18	22	18	21	23	18	Ret	15	18	21	10	12	311
3	(Germany) Richard Wagner	22	17	17	17	12	Ret	19	19	21	24	20	Ret	23	25	21	19	19	21	19	17	Ret	254
4	(Germany) Doureid Ghattas				16	18	12	DSQ	DNS	22	25	19	24	24	26	22	17	18	20	Ret	18	15	199
5	(Czech Republic) Tom Beckhäuser	Ret	20	21	18	14	15	Ret	Ret	Ret	26	21	Ret	25	27	20	18	Ret	17	18	16	14	198
6	(Germany) Laurin Heinrich	24	18	16	Ret	15	14	Ret	18	16	22	25	23	22	24	24	Ret	DNS	DNS				197.5

=== Teams' championship ===
Pos	Team	Points
1	(Italy) Prema Powerteam	597.5
2	(Netherlands) Van Amersfoort Racing	426.5
3	(Germany) ADAC Berlin-Brandenburg	306
4	(Germany) US Racing	287
5	(Austria) Neuhauser Racing	185.5
6	(Germany) Motopark	181
7	(Germany) Team Piro Sport Interdental	57
8	(Austria) Lechner Racing	35
9	(Germany) Laurin Heinrich	6
10	(Germany) Rennsport Rössler	1
