= Mick Wishofer =

Austrian racing driver

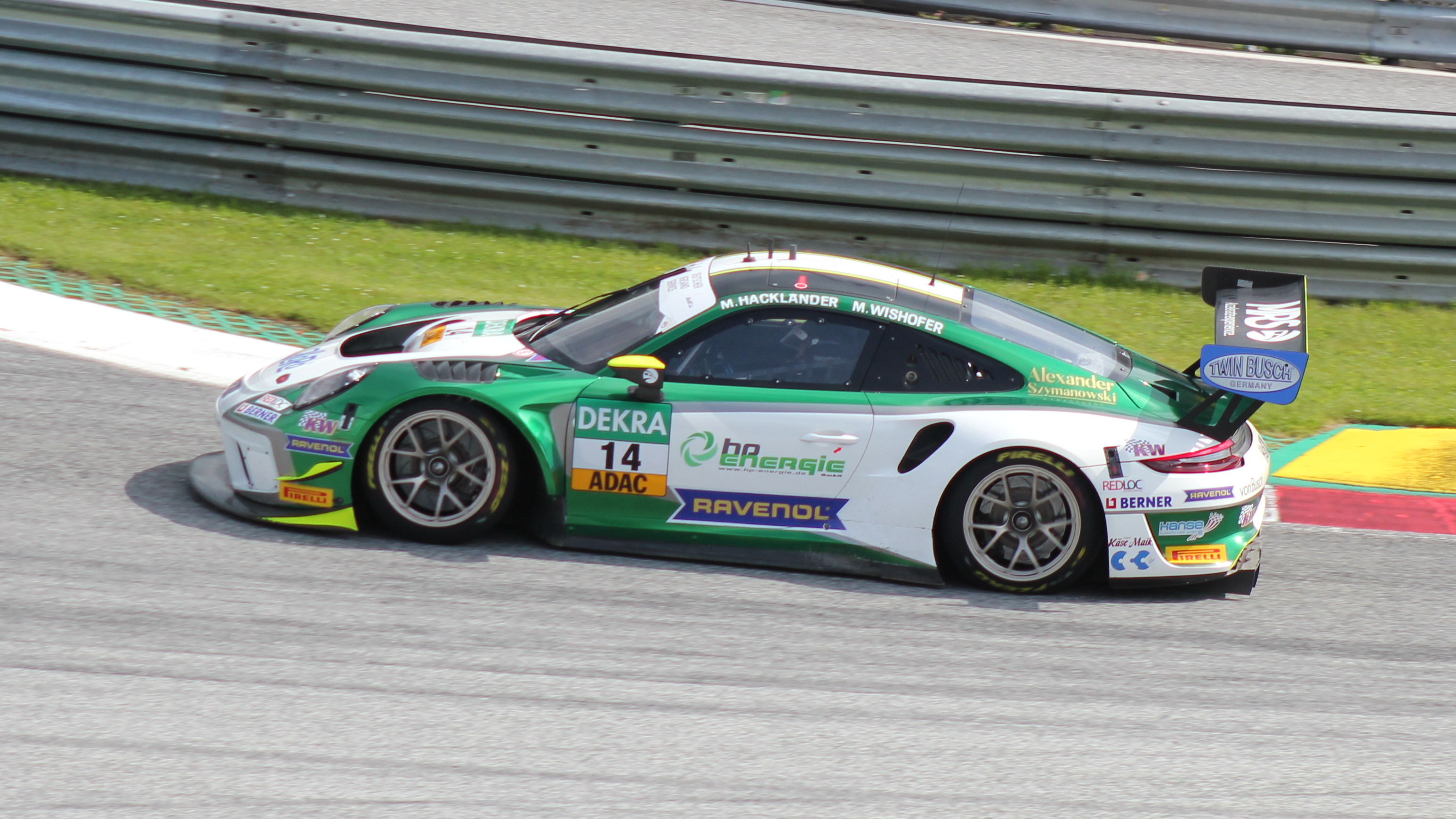
- Wishofer competing in the ADAC GT Masters in 2021
- Nationality: (Austria) Austrian
- Born: 8 October 1999 (age 27) Vienna, Austria

ADAC GT Masters career
- Debut season: 2019
- Current team: Emil Frey Racing
- Categorisation: FIA Silver
- Car number: 14

Previous series
- 2020 2017–2018: GTWC Europe Sprint Cup; ADAC Formula 4 Championship

Mick Wishofer (born 8 October 1999) is an Austrian racing driver who last competed in the Deutsche Tourenwagen Masters for GRT Grasser Racing Team.

== Career ==
=== Karting ===
Wishofer started karting in 2008. His accolades include winning the Rotax Max Challenge Austria and Rotax Max Challenge Hungary in 2011. In that year, he also came second in the Mini-Max class of the Rotax Max Challenge Central-Eastern Europe.

=== Formula 4 ===
In 2017, Wishofer made his debut in single-seater racing by joining Lechner Racing in the ADAC Formula 4 Championship. He dominantly won the Rookies' Championship by taking eleven rookie-class wins out of 21 races.

For the 2018 season, Wishofer joined US Racing–CHRS. At the Hockenheimring, he collected his maiden race win. He finished the season in sixth place with six podium finishes to his name.

=== ADAC GT Masters ===
In 2019, Wishofer made his GT racing debut in the ADAC GT Masters. He started for Team Zakspeed BKK Mobil Oil Racing in a Mercedes-AMG GT3 with Kelvin Snoeks being his teammate. The pair reached the podium once in the final round of the season at the Sachsenring. At the end of season, the two occupied 23rd place in the standings.

In 2020, Wishofer stayed with the same team. At the Lausitzring, he collected his first race win in the ADAC GT Masters together with his teammate Dorian Boccolacci.

In 2021, Wishofer started for MRS GT-Racing in a Porsche 911 GT3 R. In the opening round of the season at the Motorsport Arena Oschersleben, he achieved a single podium finish together with Maximilian Hackländer. After the first four rounds of the season, Wishofer was replaced by Erik Johansson.

In 2022, Wishofer joined Emil Frey Racing driving in a Lamborghini Huracán GT3 Evo together with Konsta Lappalainen. In the third round at Circuit Zandvoort the pair took their first win of the season.

=== DTM ===
In 2023, Wishofer made his debut in DTM, competing for GRT Grasser Racing Team.

== Racing record ==
=== Career summary ===
Season	Series	Team	Races	Wins	Poles	F/Laps	Podiums	Points	Position
2017	ADAC Formula 4 Championship	Lechner Racing	21	0	0	0	0	1	23rd
2018	ADAC Formula 4 Championship	US Racing–CHRS	20	1	0	3	6	160	6th
2019	ADAC GT Masters	Team Zakspeed BKK Mobil Oil Racing	12	0	0	0	1	22	23rd
2020	ADAC GT Masters	Team Zakspeed BKK Mobil Oil Racing	14	1	0	0	1	70	12th
2020	GT World Challenge Europe Sprint Cup	Toksport WRT	2	0	0	0	0	0	NC
2021	ADAC GT Masters	MRS GT-Racing	8	0	0	0	1	16	33rd
2022	ADAC GT Masters	Emil Frey Racing	13	1	1	0	1	83	17th
2022	GT World Challenge Europe Endurance Cup	Emil Frey Racing	2	0	0	0	0	6	31st
2023	Deutsche Tourenwagen Masters	GRT Grasser Racing Team	6	0	0	0	0	0	33rd

^{*} Season still in progress.

=== Complete ADAC Formula 4 Championship results ===
(key) (Races in bold indicate pole position) (Races in italics indicate fastest lap)

Year	Team	1	2	3	4	5	6	7	8	9	10	11	12	13	14	15	16	17	18	19	20	21	Pos	Points
2017	Lechner Racing	OSC1; 1; 19	OSC1; 2; 14	OSC1; 3; 19	LAU; 1; 14	LAU; 2; 17	LAU; 3 Ret	RBR; 1; 15	RBR; 2 Ret	RBR; 3; 20	OSC2; 1; 14	OSC2; 2; 16	OSC2; 3; 15	NÜR; 1; 18	NÜR; 2; 19	NÜR; 3; 14	SAC; 1; 21	SAC; 2; 11	SAC; 3; 19	HOC; 1; 12	HOC; 2; 13	HOC; 3; 10	23rd	1
2018	US Racing–CHRS	OSC; 1; 2	OSC; 2 Ret	OSC; 3; 7	HOC1; 1 Ret	HOC1; 2; 7	HOC1; 3; 1	LAU; 1; 3	LAU; 2; 4	LAU; 3; 3	RBR; 1; 9	RBR; 2; 3	RBR; 3; 6	HOC2; 1; 14	HOC2; 2 Ret	NÜR; 1; 8	NÜR; 2; 16	NÜR; 3 Ret	HOC3; 1; 4	HOC3; 2; 2	HOC3; 3; 8		6th	160

=== Complete ADAC GT Masters results ===
(key) (Races in bold indicate pole position) (Races in italics indicate fastest lap)

Year	Team	Car	1	2	3	4	5	6	7	8	9	10	11	12	13	14	DC	Points
2019	Team Zakspeed BKK Mobil Oil Racing	Mercedes-AMG GT3	OSC; 1 Ret	OSC; 2 DNS	MST; 1; 28	MST; 2 DNS	RBR; 1; 14	RBR; 2; 18	ZAN; 1 Ret	ZAN; 2; 23	NÜR; 1; 30	NÜR; 2; 25	HOC; 1 Ret	HOC; 2; 13	SAC; 1; 3	SAC; 2; 27	23rd	22
2020	Team Zakspeed BKK Mobil Oil Racing	Mercedes-AMG GT3 Evo	LAU1; 1; 11	LAU1; 2; 15	NÜR; 1; 5	NÜR; 2; 11	HOC; 1; 17	HOC; 2; 16	SAC; 1; 5	SAC; 2; 17	RBR; 1 Ret	RBR; 2; 15	LAU2; 1 DSQ	LAU2; 2; 1	OSC; 1 Ret	OSC; 2; 6	12th	70
2021	MRS GT-Racing	Porsche 911 GT3 R	OSC; 1; 19	OSC; 2; 3	RBR; 1; 19	RBR; 2 Ret	ZAN; 1; 19	ZAN; 2 Ret	LAU; 1; 18	LAU; 2; 18	SAC; 1	SAC; 2	HOC; 1	HOC; 2	NÜR; 1	NÜR; 2	33rd	16
2022	Emil Frey Racing	Lamborghini Huracán GT3 Evo	OSC; 1; 6	OSC; 2; 11	RBR; 1; 18	RBR; 2 DNS	**ZAN**; **1**; 1	ZAN; 2; 19	NÜR; 1; 11	NÜR; 2; 6	LAU; 1; 21	LAU; 2; 16	SAC; 1; 12	SAC; 2 Ret	HOC; 1; 6	HOC; 2; 5	17th	83

^{*} Season still in progress.

=== Complete Deutsche Tourenwagen Masters results ===
(key) (Races in bold indicate pole position; races in italics indicate fastest lap)

Year	Entrant	Chassis	1	2	3	4	5	6	7	8	9	10	11	12	13	14	15	16	Rank	Points
2023	GRT Grasser Racing Team	Lamborghini Huracán GT3 Evo 2	OSC; 1 Ret	OSC; 2 Ret	ZAN; 1; 22	ZAN; 2 Ret	NOR; 1 DSQ	NOR; 2 Ret	NÜR; 1	NÜR; 2	LAU; 1	LAU; 2	SAC; 1	SAC; 2	RBR; 1	RBR; 2	HOC; 1	HOC; 2	33rd	0
