= 2022 GT World Challenge Europe Endurance Cup =

Motorsports event

The 2022 Fanatec GT World Challenge Europe Endurance Cup was the twelfth season of the GT World Challenge Europe Endurance Cup since its inception in 2011 as the Blancpain Endurance Series.

The season began on 1 April at Imola and ended on 2 October at Circuit de Barcelona-Catalunya. In a change from the 2021 schedule, the round at the Nürburgring was moved to the Hockenheimring. On 29 October 2021, a second change to the schedule was announced, moving the opening round from Monza to Imola and staging the event one week earlier.

== Calendar ==
| Round | Race | Circuit | Date |
|---|---|---|---|
| 1 | 3 Hours of Imola | Imola Circuit, Imola, Italy | 1–3 April |
| 2 | Circuit Paul Ricard 1000 km | Circuit Paul Ricard, Le Castellet, France | 3–5 June |
| 3 | TotalEnergies 24 Hours of Spa | Circuit de Spa-Francorchamps, Stavelot, Belgium | 28–31 July |
| 4 | 3 Hours of Hockenheim | Hockenheimring, Hockenheim, Germany | 2–4 September |
| 5 | 3 Hours of Barcelona | Circuit de Barcelona-Catalunya, Montmeló, Spain | 30 September–2 October |

== Entry list ==
| Team | Car | No. | Drivers | Class | Rounds |
|---|---|---|---|---|---|
| (Germany) AMG Team GetSpeed | Mercedes-AMG GT3 Evo | 2 | (Netherlands) Steijn Schothorst | P | All |
| (Germany) AMG Team GetSpeed | Mercedes-AMG GT3 Evo | 2 | (Germany) Luca Stolz | P | All |
| (Germany) AMG Team GetSpeed | Mercedes-AMG GT3 Evo | 2 | (Germany) Maro Engel | P | 1–2, 4–5 |
| (Germany) AMG Team GetSpeed | Mercedes-AMG GT3 Evo | 2 | (Germany) Maximilian Götz | P | 3 |
| (Germany) GetSpeed Performance | Mercedes-AMG GT3 Evo | 3 | (France) Sébastien Baud | S | All |
| (Germany) GetSpeed Performance | Mercedes-AMG GT3 Evo | 3 | (Denmark) Valdemar Eriksen | S | All |
| (Germany) GetSpeed Performance | Mercedes-AMG GT3 Evo | 3 | (Canada) Jeff Kingsley | S | All |
| (Germany) GetSpeed Performance | Mercedes-AMG GT3 Evo | 44 | (Germany) Patrick Assenheimer | G | 3 |
| (Germany) GetSpeed Performance | Mercedes-AMG GT3 Evo | 44 | (France) Michael Blanchemain | G | 3 |
| (Germany) GetSpeed Performance | Mercedes-AMG GT3 Evo | 44 | (Finland) Axel Blom | G | 3 |
| (Germany) GetSpeed Performance | Mercedes-AMG GT3 Evo | 44 | (France) Jim Pla | G | 3 |
| (Germany) Haupt Racing Team | Mercedes-AMG GT3 Evo | 4 | (Germany) Jannes Fittje | S | All |
| (Germany) Haupt Racing Team | Mercedes-AMG GT3 Evo | 4 | (Australia) Jordan Love | S | All |
| (Germany) Haupt Racing Team | Mercedes-AMG GT3 Evo | 4 | (Switzerland) Alain Valente | S | All |
| (Germany) Haupt Racing Team | Mercedes-AMG GT3 Evo | 4 | (United Kingdom) Frank Bird | S | 3 |
| (Germany) Haupt Racing Team | Mercedes-AMG GT3 Evo | 5 | (Germany) Hubert Haupt | G | All |
| (Germany) Haupt Racing Team | Mercedes-AMG GT3 Evo | 5 | (India) Arjun Maini | G | All |
| (Germany) Haupt Racing Team | Mercedes-AMG GT3 Evo | 5 | (Germany) Florian Scholze | G | All |
| (Germany) Haupt Racing Team | Mercedes-AMG GT3 Evo | 5 | (Italy) Gabriele Piana | G | 3 |
| (United Kingdom) Sky - Tempesta Racing by HRT | Mercedes-AMG GT3 Evo | 93 | (Italy) Eddie Cheever III | G | 3–5 |
| (United Kingdom) Sky - Tempesta Racing by HRT | Mercedes-AMG GT3 Evo | 93 | (United Kingdom) Chris Froggatt | G | 3–5 |
| (United Kingdom) Sky - Tempesta Racing by HRT | Mercedes-AMG GT3 Evo | 93 | (Hong Kong) Jonathan Hui | G | 3, 5 |
| (United Kingdom) Sky - Tempesta Racing by HRT | Mercedes-AMG GT3 Evo | 93 | (Italy) Loris Spinelli | G | 3 |
| (United Kingdom) Sky - Tempesta Racing by HRT | Mercedes-AMG GT3 Evo | 93 | (Austria) Martin Konrad | G | 4 |
| (Oman) Al Manar Racing by HRT | Mercedes-AMG GT3 Evo | 777 | (Oman) Al Faisal Al Zubair | S | All |
| (Oman) Al Manar Racing by HRT | Mercedes-AMG GT3 Evo | 777 | (Zimbabwe) Axcil Jefferies | S | All |
| (Oman) Al Manar Racing by HRT | Mercedes-AMG GT3 Evo | 777 | (Germany) Fabian Schiller | S | All |
| (Oman) Al Manar Racing by HRT | Mercedes-AMG GT3 Evo | 777 | (Canada) Daniel Morad | S | 3 |
| (United States) Orange 1 K-PAX Racing | Lamborghini Huracán GT3 Evo | 6 | (Italy) Andrea Caldarelli | P | 3 |
| (United States) Orange 1 K-PAX Racing | Lamborghini Huracán GT3 Evo | 6 | (Italy) Marco Mapelli | P | 3 |
| (United States) Orange 1 K-PAX Racing | Lamborghini Huracán GT3 Evo | 6 | (South Africa) Jordan Pepper | P | 3 |
| (United Kingdom) Inception Racing with Optimum Motorsport | McLaren 720S GT3 | 7 | (United States) Brendan Iribe | G | All |
| (United Kingdom) Inception Racing with Optimum Motorsport | McLaren 720S GT3 | 7 | (United Kingdom) Ollie Millroy | G | All |
| (United Kingdom) Inception Racing with Optimum Motorsport | McLaren 720S GT3 | 7 | (Denmark) Frederik Schandorff | G | All |
| (United Kingdom) Inception Racing with Optimum Motorsport | McLaren 720S GT3 | 7 | (Guernsey) Sebastian Priaulx | G | 3 |
| (France) AGS Events | Lamborghini Huracán GT3 Evo | 8 | (France) Loris Cabirou | G | All |
| (France) AGS Events | Lamborghini Huracán GT3 Evo | 8 | (France) Nicolas Gomar | G | All |
| (France) AGS Events | Lamborghini Huracán GT3 Evo | 8 | (France) Mike Parisy | G | All |
| (France) AGS Events | Lamborghini Huracán GT3 Evo | 8 | (Netherlands) Ruben del Sarte | G | 3 |
| (Germany) Herberth Motorsport | Porsche 911 GT3 R | 9 | (Hong Kong) Antares Au | PA | 3 |
| (Germany) Herberth Motorsport | Porsche 911 GT3 R | 9 | (New Zealand) Jaxon Evans | PA | 3 |
| (Germany) Herberth Motorsport | Porsche 911 GT3 R | 9 | (Luxembourg) Dylan Pereira | PA | 3 |
| (Germany) Herberth Motorsport | Porsche 911 GT3 R | 9 | (Macau) Kevin Tse | PA | 3 |
| (Germany) Herberth Motorsport | Porsche 911 GT3 R | 911 | (Germany) Ralf Bohn | G | All |
| (Germany) Herberth Motorsport | Porsche 911 GT3 R | 911 | (Germany) Alfred Renauer | G | All |
| (Germany) Herberth Motorsport | Porsche 911 GT3 R | 911 | (Germany) Robert Renauer | G | All |
| (Germany) Herberth Motorsport | Porsche 911 GT3 R | 24 | (Switzerland) Nicolas Leutwiler | PA | 2–3 |
| (Germany) Herberth Motorsport | Porsche 911 GT3 R | 24 | (Belgium) Alessio Picariello | PA | 2–3 |
| (Germany) Herberth Motorsport | Porsche 911 GT3 R | 24 | (Switzerland) Ivan Jacoma | PA | 2 |
| (Germany) Herberth Motorsport | Porsche 911 GT3 R | 24 | (Germany) Stefan Aust | PA | 3 |
| (Germany) Herberth Motorsport | Porsche 911 GT3 R | 24 | (Germany) Nico Menzel | PA | 3 |
| (Belgium) Boutsen Racing | Audi R8 LMS Evo II | 10 | (France) Adam Eteki | G | All |
| (Belgium) Boutsen Racing | Audi R8 LMS Evo II | 10 | (Belgium) Benjamin Lessennes | G | All |
| (Belgium) Boutsen Racing | Audi R8 LMS Evo II | 10 | (Saudi Arabia) Karim Ojjeh | G | All |
| (Belgium) Boutsen Racing | Audi R8 LMS Evo II | 10 | (France) Antoine Leclerc | G | 3 |
| (Italy) / Tresor by Car Collection (Note: Car No. 11 entered as Tresor by Car Collection at all rounds. Car No. 12 entered as Tresor by Car Collection at rounds 1–2 and 4–5, and as Audi Sport Team Tresor at round 3.); (Italy) / Audi Sport Team Tresor | Audi R8 LMS Evo II | 11 | (Italy) Lorenzo Patrese | S | All |
| (Italy) / Tresor by Car Collection; (Italy) / Audi Sport Team Tresor | Audi R8 LMS Evo II | 11 | (France) Hugo Valente | S | 1–2, 4–5 |
| (Italy) / Tresor by Car Collection; (Italy) / Audi Sport Team Tresor | Audi R8 LMS Evo II | 11 | (Finland) Axel Blom | S | 1–2 |
| (Italy) / Tresor by Car Collection; (Italy) / Audi Sport Team Tresor | Audi R8 LMS Evo II | 11 | (Italy) Daniele di Amato | S | 3 |
| (Italy) / Tresor by Car Collection; (Italy) / Audi Sport Team Tresor | Audi R8 LMS Evo II | 11 | (Italy) Alberto Di Folco | S | 3 |
| (Italy) / Tresor by Car Collection; (Italy) / Audi Sport Team Tresor | Audi R8 LMS Evo II | 11 | (France) Pierre-Alexandre Jean | S | 3 |
| (Italy) / Tresor by Car Collection; (Italy) / Audi Sport Team Tresor | Audi R8 LMS Evo II | 11 | (Netherlands) Thierry Vermeulen | S | 4–5 |
| (Italy) / Tresor by Car Collection; (Italy) / Audi Sport Team Tresor | Audi R8 LMS Evo II | 12 | (San Marino) Mattia Drudi (Note: Drudi is an Italian driver competing under a Sammarinese licence.) | P | All |
| (Italy) / Tresor by Car Collection; (Italy) / Audi Sport Team Tresor | Audi R8 LMS Evo II | 12 | (Italy) Luca Ghiotto | P | All |
| (Italy) / Tresor by Car Collection; (Italy) / Audi Sport Team Tresor | Audi R8 LMS Evo II | 12 | (Germany) Christopher Haase | P | All |
| (Switzerland) Emil Frey Racing | Lamborghini Huracán GT3 Evo | 14 | (Finland) Konsta Lappalainen | S | All |
| (Switzerland) Emil Frey Racing | Lamborghini Huracán GT3 Evo | 14 | (South Africa) Stuart White | S | All |
| (Switzerland) Emil Frey Racing | Lamborghini Huracán GT3 Evo | 14 | (Finland) Tuomas Tujula | S | 1–3 |
| (Switzerland) Emil Frey Racing | Lamborghini Huracán GT3 Evo | 14 | (Austria) Mick Wishofer | S | 4–5 |
| (Switzerland) Emil Frey Racing | Lamborghini Huracán GT3 Evo | 19 | (Italy) Giacomo Altoè | P | All |
| (Switzerland) Emil Frey Racing | Lamborghini Huracán GT3 Evo | 19 | (France) Arthur Rougier | P | All |
| (Switzerland) Emil Frey Racing | Lamborghini Huracán GT3 Evo | 19 | (France) Léo Roussel | P | All |
| (Switzerland) Emil Frey Racing | Lamborghini Huracán GT3 Evo | 63 | (United Kingdom) Jack Aitken | P | All |
| (Switzerland) Emil Frey Racing | Lamborghini Huracán GT3 Evo | 63 | (Italy) Mirko Bortolotti | P | All |
| (Switzerland) Emil Frey Racing | Lamborghini Huracán GT3 Evo | 63 | (Spain) Albert Costa | P | All |
| (New Zealand) EBM Giga Racing | Porsche 911 GT3 R | 16 | (Malaysia) Adrian D'Silva | PA | 3 |
| (New Zealand) EBM Giga Racing | Porsche 911 GT3 R | 16 | (Australia) Brenton Grove | PA | 3 |
| (New Zealand) EBM Giga Racing | Porsche 911 GT3 R | 16 | (Australia) Stephen Grove | PA | 3 |
| (New Zealand) EBM Giga Racing | Porsche 911 GT3 R | 16 | (New Zealand) Matthew Payne | PA | 3 |
| (Thailand) Singha Racing Team TP 12 | Porsche 911 GT3 R | 39 | (Thailand) Piti Bhirombhakdi | G | 2–3 |
| (Thailand) Singha Racing Team TP 12 | Porsche 911 GT3 R | 39 | (Thailand) Tanart Sathienthirakul | G | 2–3 |
| (Thailand) Singha Racing Team TP 12 | Porsche 911 GT3 R | 39 | (New Zealand) Matthew Payne | G | 2 |
| (Thailand) Singha Racing Team TP 12 | Porsche 911 GT3 R | 39 | (New Zealand) Earl Bamber | G | 3 |
| (Thailand) Singha Racing Team TP 12 | Porsche 911 GT3 R | 39 | (France) Christophe Hamon | G | 3 |
| (Germany) SPS Automotive Performance | Mercedes-AMG GT3 Evo | 20 | (Germany) Valentin Pierburg | PA | 1–2, 4–5 |
| (Germany) SPS Automotive Performance | Mercedes-AMG GT3 Evo | 20 | (Austria) Dominik Baumann | PA | 1–2, 4–5 |
| (Germany) SPS Automotive Performance | Mercedes-AMG GT3 Evo | 20 | (United Kingdom) Ian Loggie | PA | 1, 4–5 |
| (Germany) SPS Automotive Performance | Mercedes-AMG GT3 Evo | 20 | (Austria) Martin Konrad | PA | 2 |
| (Germany) SPS Automotive Performance | Mercedes-AMG GT3 Evo | 20 | (Germany) Valentin Pierburg | B | 3 |
| (Germany) SPS Automotive Performance | Mercedes-AMG GT3 Evo | 20 | (Saudi Arabia) Reema Juffali | B | 3 |
| (Germany) SPS Automotive Performance | Mercedes-AMG GT3 Evo | 20 | (United States) George Kurtz | B | 3 |
| (Germany) SPS Automotive Performance | Mercedes-AMG GT3 Evo | 20 | (Germany) Tim Müller | B | 3 |
| (Australia) SunEnergy1 Racing by SPS | Mercedes-AMG GT3 Evo | 75 | (Austria) Dominik Baumann | PA | 3 |
| (Australia) SunEnergy1 Racing by SPS | Mercedes-AMG GT3 Evo | 75 | (Switzerland) Philip Ellis | PA | 3 |
| (Australia) SunEnergy1 Racing by SPS | Mercedes-AMG GT3 Evo | 75 | (Australia) Kenny Habul | PA | 3 |
| (Australia) SunEnergy1 Racing by SPS | Mercedes-AMG GT3 Evo | 75 | (Austria) Martin Konrad | PA | 3 |
| (Italy) AF Corse | Ferrari 488 GT3 Evo 2020 | 21 | (Italy) Alessandro Balzan | G | All |
| (Italy) AF Corse | Ferrari 488 GT3 Evo 2020 | 21 | (France) Hugo Delacour | G | All |
| (Italy) AF Corse | Ferrari 488 GT3 Evo 2020 | 21 | (Monaco) Cédric Sbirrazzuoli | G | All |
| (Italy) AF Corse | Ferrari 488 GT3 Evo 2020 | 21 | (South Africa) David Perel | G | 3 |
| (Italy) AF Corse | Ferrari 488 GT3 Evo 2020 | 52 | (Italy) Andrea Bertolini | PA | All |
| (Italy) AF Corse | Ferrari 488 GT3 Evo 2020 | 52 | (Italy) Stefano Costantini | PA | All |
| (Italy) AF Corse | Ferrari 488 GT3 Evo 2020 | 52 | (Belgium) Louis Machiels | PA | All |
| (Italy) AF Corse | Ferrari 488 GT3 Evo 2020 | 52 | (Italy) Alessio Rovera | PA | 3 |
| (Germany) Allied Racing | Porsche 911 GT3 R | 22 | (Switzerland) Dominik Fischli | S | 1–4 |
| (Germany) Allied Racing | Porsche 911 GT3 R | 22 | (Denmark) Patrik Matthiesen | S | 1–4 |
| (Germany) Allied Racing | Porsche 911 GT3 R | 22 | (Germany) Joel Sturm | S | 1–4 |
| (Germany) Allied Racing | Porsche 911 GT3 R | 22 | (Germany) Vincent Andronaco | S | 3 |
| (Germany) Allied Racing | Porsche 911 GT3 R | 91 | Alex Malykhin (Note: Alex Malykhin is Belarusian and Konstantin Tereshchenko is Russian, but they both competed as neutral competitors as Belarusian and Russian national emblems were banned by the FIA due to the Russian invasion of Ukraine.) | G | 2–5 |
| (Germany) Allied Racing | Porsche 911 GT3 R | 91 | (United Kingdom) Ben Barker | G | 2 |
| (Germany) Allied Racing | Porsche 911 GT3 R | 91 | (United Kingdom) James Dorlin | G | 2 |
| (Germany) Allied Racing | Porsche 911 GT3 R | 91 | (Turkey) Ayhancan Güven | G | 3–5 |
| (Germany) Allied Racing | Porsche 911 GT3 R | 91 | (Switzerland) Julian Apothéloz | G | 3 |
| (Germany) Allied Racing | Porsche 911 GT3 R | 91 | (France) Florian Latorre | G | 3 |
| (United Kingdom) Heart of Racing with TF Sport | Aston Martin Vantage AMR GT3 | 23 | (Republic of Ireland) Charlie Eastwood | P | 3 |
| (United Kingdom) Heart of Racing with TF Sport | Aston Martin Vantage AMR GT3 | 23 | (United Kingdom) Ross Gunn | P | 3 |
| (United Kingdom) Heart of Racing with TF Sport | Aston Martin Vantage AMR GT3 | 23 | (Spain) Alex Riberas | P | 3 |
| (France) / Audi Sport Team Saintéloc (Note: Car No. 25 entered as Saintéloc Junior Team at rounds 1–2 and 4–5, and as Audi Sport Team Saintéloc at round 3. Car No. 26 entered as Saintéloc Junior Team at all rounds.); (France) / Saintéloc Junior Team | Audi R8 LMS Evo II | 25 | (Switzerland) Lucas Légeret | P | All |
| (France) / Audi Sport Team Saintéloc; (France) / Saintéloc Junior Team | Audi R8 LMS Evo II | 25 | (Germany) Christopher Mies | P | All |
| (France) / Audi Sport Team Saintéloc; (France) / Saintéloc Junior Team | Audi R8 LMS Evo II | 25 | (Switzerland) Patric Niederhauser | P | All |
| (France) / Audi Sport Team Saintéloc; (France) / Saintéloc Junior Team | Audi R8 LMS Evo II | 26 | (Belgium) Nicolas Baert | S | All |
| (France) / Audi Sport Team Saintéloc; (France) / Saintéloc Junior Team | Audi R8 LMS Evo II | 26 | (France) César Gazeau | S | All |
| (France) / Audi Sport Team Saintéloc; (France) / Saintéloc Junior Team | Audi R8 LMS Evo II | 26 | (France) Aurélien Panis | S | All |
| (France) / Audi Sport Team Saintéloc; (France) / Saintéloc Junior Team | Audi R8 LMS Evo II | 26 | (Belgium) Gilles Magnus | S | 3 |
| (Germany) Leipert Motorsport | Lamborghini Huracán GT3 Evo | 27 | (New Zealand) Brendon Leitch | S | All |
| (Germany) Leipert Motorsport | Lamborghini Huracán GT3 Evo | 27 | (Germany) Dennis Fetzer | S | 1 |
| (Germany) Leipert Motorsport | Lamborghini Huracán GT3 Evo | 27 | (United Kingdom) Jordan Witt | S | 1 |
| (Germany) Leipert Motorsport | Lamborghini Huracán GT3 Evo | 27 | (Spain) Isaac Tutumlu | S | 2–5 |
| (Germany) Leipert Motorsport | Lamborghini Huracán GT3 Evo | 27 | (United States) Tyler Cooke | S | 2–3, 5 |
| (Germany) Leipert Motorsport | Lamborghini Huracán GT3 Evo | 27 | (Netherlands) Max Weering | S | 3 |
| (Germany) Leipert Motorsport | Lamborghini Huracán GT3 Evo | 27 | (Germany) Jusuf Owega | S | 4 |
| (Canada) ST Racing | BMW M4 GT3 | 28 | (United States) Harry Gottsacker | S | 3 |
| (Canada) ST Racing | BMW M4 GT3 | 28 | (Netherlands) Maxime Oosten | S | 3 |
| (Canada) ST Racing | BMW M4 GT3 | 28 | (Canada) Samantha Tan | S | 3 |
| (Canada) ST Racing | BMW M4 GT3 | 28 | (Canada) Nick Wittmer | S | 3 |
| (Belgium) / Audi Sport Team WRT (Note: Cars No. 30, No. 31 and No. 33 entered as Team WRT at all rounds. Cars No. 32 and No. 46 entered as Team WRT at rounds 1–2 and 4–5, and as Audi Sport Team WRT at round 3.); (Belgium) / Team WRT | Audi R8 LMS Evo II | 30 | (Denmark) Benjamin Goethe | S | All |
| (Belgium) / Audi Sport Team WRT; (Belgium) / Team WRT | Audi R8 LMS Evo II | 30 | (France) Thomas Neubauer | S | All |
| (Belgium) / Audi Sport Team WRT; (Belgium) / Team WRT | Audi R8 LMS Evo II | 30 | (France) Jean-Baptiste Simmenauer | S | All |
| (Belgium) / Audi Sport Team WRT; (Belgium) / Team WRT | Audi R8 LMS Evo II | 31 | (United Kingdom) Finlay Hutchison | S | All |
| (Belgium) / Audi Sport Team WRT; (Belgium) / Team WRT | Audi R8 LMS Evo II | 31 | (Mexico) Diego Menchaca | S | All |
| (Belgium) / Audi Sport Team WRT; (Belgium) / Team WRT | Audi R8 LMS Evo II | 31 | (United Kingdom) Lewis Proctor | S | All |
| (Belgium) / Audi Sport Team WRT; (Belgium) / Team WRT | Audi R8 LMS Evo II | 32 | (Belgium) Dries Vanthoor | P | All |
| (Belgium) / Audi Sport Team WRT; (Belgium) / Team WRT | Audi R8 LMS Evo II | 32 | (Belgium) Charles Weerts | P | All |
| (Belgium) / Audi Sport Team WRT; (Belgium) / Team WRT | Audi R8 LMS Evo II | 32 | (South Africa) Kelvin van der Linde | P | 1–4 |
| (Belgium) / Audi Sport Team WRT; (Belgium) / Team WRT | Audi R8 LMS Evo II | 32 | (Switzerland) Ricardo Feller | P | 5 |
| (Belgium) / Audi Sport Team WRT; (Belgium) / Team WRT | Audi R8 LMS Evo II | 33 | (France) Arnold Robin | G | All |
| (Belgium) / Audi Sport Team WRT; (Belgium) / Team WRT | Audi R8 LMS Evo II | 33 | (France) Maxime Robin | G | All |
| (Belgium) / Audi Sport Team WRT; (Belgium) / Team WRT | Audi R8 LMS Evo II | 33 | (Japan) Ryuichiro Tomita | G | All |
| (Belgium) / Audi Sport Team WRT; (Belgium) / Team WRT | Audi R8 LMS Evo II | 33 | (Belgium) Ulysse de Pauw | G | 3 |
| (Belgium) / Audi Sport Team WRT; (Belgium) / Team WRT | Audi R8 LMS Evo II | 46 | (Switzerland) Nico Müller | P | All |
| (Belgium) / Audi Sport Team WRT; (Belgium) / Team WRT | Audi R8 LMS Evo II | 46 | (Italy) Valentino Rossi | P | All |
| (Belgium) / Audi Sport Team WRT; (Belgium) / Team WRT | Audi R8 LMS Evo II | 46 | (Belgium) Frédéric Vervisch | P | All |
| (Germany) Walkenhorst Motorsport | BMW M4 GT3 | 34 | (United States) Michael Dinan | G | 3 |
| (Germany) Walkenhorst Motorsport | BMW M4 GT3 | 34 | (United States) Robby Foley | G | 3 |
| (Germany) Walkenhorst Motorsport | BMW M4 GT3 | 34 | (United States) Richard Heistand | G | 3 |
| (Germany) Walkenhorst Motorsport | BMW M4 GT3 | 34 | (Germany) Jens Klingmann | G | 3 |
| (Germany) Walkenhorst Motorsport | BMW M4 GT3 | 35 | (Germany) Jörg Breuer | B | 3 |
| (Germany) Walkenhorst Motorsport | BMW M4 GT3 | 35 | (Germany) Theo Oeverhaus | B | 3 |
| (Germany) Walkenhorst Motorsport | BMW M4 GT3 | 35 | (Germany) Henry Walkenhorst | B | 3 |
| (Germany) Walkenhorst Motorsport | BMW M4 GT3 | 35 | (United States) Don Yount | B | 3 |
| (United Kingdom) Jota Sport | McLaren 720S GT3 | 38 | (United Kingdom) Rob Bell | P | All |
| (United Kingdom) Jota Sport | McLaren 720S GT3 | 38 | (Germany) Marvin Kirchhöfer | P | All |
| (United Kingdom) Jota Sport | McLaren 720S GT3 | 38 | (United Kingdom) Oliver Wilkinson | P | All |
| (Hong Kong) KCMG | Porsche 911 GT3 R | 47 | (Norway) Dennis Olsen | P | 3 |
| (Hong Kong) KCMG | Porsche 911 GT3 R | 47 | (United Kingdom) Nick Tandy | P | 3 |
| (Hong Kong) KCMG | Porsche 911 GT3 R | 47 | (Belgium) Laurens Vanthoor | P | 3 |
| (Germany) ROWE Racing | BMW M4 GT3 | 50 | (United Kingdom) Daniel Harper | P | All |
| (Germany) ROWE Racing | BMW M4 GT3 | 50 | (Germany) Max Hesse | P | All |
| (Germany) ROWE Racing | BMW M4 GT3 | 50 | (United States) Neil Verhagen | P | All |
| (Germany) ROWE Racing | BMW M4 GT3 | 98 | (Brazil) Augusto Farfus | P | All |
| (Germany) ROWE Racing | BMW M4 GT3 | 98 | (United Kingdom) Nick Yelloly | P | All |
| (Germany) ROWE Racing | BMW M4 GT3 | 98 | (Netherlands) Nicky Catsburg | P | 1–4 |
| (Germany) ROWE Racing | BMW M4 GT3 | 98 | (Austria) Philipp Eng | P | 5 |
| (Italy) Iron Lynx | Ferrari 488 GT3 Evo 2020 | 51 | (Spain) Miguel Molina | P | All |
| (Italy) Iron Lynx | Ferrari 488 GT3 Evo 2020 | 51 | (Denmark) Nicklas Nielsen | P | All |
| (Italy) Iron Lynx | Ferrari 488 GT3 Evo 2020 | 51 | (United Kingdom) James Calado | P | 1–4 |
| (Italy) Iron Lynx | Ferrari 488 GT3 Evo 2020 | 51 | (Italy) Giancarlo Fisichella | P | 5 |
| (Italy) Iron Lynx | Ferrari 488 GT3 Evo 2020 | 71 | (Italy) Antonio Fuoco | P | All |
| (Italy) Iron Lynx | Ferrari 488 GT3 Evo 2020 | 71 | (Italy) Davide Rigon | P | 1–4 |
| (Italy) Iron Lynx | Ferrari 488 GT3 Evo 2020 | 71 | (Brazil) Daniel Serra | P | 1–3 |
| (Italy) Iron Lynx | Ferrari 488 GT3 Evo 2020 | 71 | (Italy) Alessio Rovera | P | 4–5 |
| (Italy) Iron Lynx | Ferrari 488 GT3 Evo 2020 | 71 | (Italy) Alessandro Pier Guidi | P | 5 |
| (Italy) Iron Dames | Ferrari 488 GT3 Evo 2020 | 83 | (Belgium) Sarah Bovy | G | All |
| (Italy) Iron Dames | Ferrari 488 GT3 Evo 2020 | 83 | (Switzerland) Rahel Frey | G | All |
| (Italy) Iron Dames | Ferrari 488 GT3 Evo 2020 | 83 | (Denmark) Michelle Gatting | G | All |
| (Italy) Iron Dames | Ferrari 488 GT3 Evo 2020 | 83 | (France) Doriane Pin | G | 3 |
| (Italy) Dinamic Motorsport | Porsche 911 GT3 R | 54 | (Austria) Klaus Bachler | P | All |
| (Italy) Dinamic Motorsport | Porsche 911 GT3 R | 54 | (France) Côme Ledogar | P | 1–3 |
| (Italy) Dinamic Motorsport | Porsche 911 GT3 R | 54 | (Italy) Matteo Cairoli | P | 1–2, 4–5 |
| (Italy) Dinamic Motorsport | Porsche 911 GT3 R | 54 | (Austria) Thomas Preining | P | 3 |
| (Italy) Dinamic Motorsport | Porsche 911 GT3 R | 54 | (Belgium) Alessio Picariello | P | 4–5 |
| (Italy) Dinamic Motorsport | Porsche 911 GT3 R | 56 | (Norway) Marius Nakken | S | All |
| (Italy) Dinamic Motorsport | Porsche 911 GT3 R | 56 | (Italy) Giorgio Roda | S | All |
| (Italy) Dinamic Motorsport | Porsche 911 GT3 R | 56 | (Switzerland) Mauro Calamia | S | 1–3 |
| (Italy) Dinamic Motorsport | Porsche 911 GT3 R | 56 | (Denmark) Mikkel O. Pedersen | S | 3–5 |
| (Hong Kong) AMG Team GruppeM Racing | Mercedes-AMG GT3 Evo | 55 | (Germany) Maximilian Buhk | P | 3 |
| (Hong Kong) AMG Team GruppeM Racing | Mercedes-AMG GT3 Evo | 55 | (Germany) Maro Engel | P | 3 |
| (Hong Kong) AMG Team GruppeM Racing | Mercedes-AMG GT3 Evo | 55 | (Canada) Mikaël Grenier | P | 3 |
| (United Kingdom) Sky - Tempesta with GruppeM Racing | Mercedes-AMG GT3 Evo | 93 | (Italy) Eddie Cheever III | G | 1–2 |
| (United Kingdom) Sky - Tempesta with GruppeM Racing | Mercedes-AMG GT3 Evo | 93 | (United Kingdom) Chris Froggatt | G | 1–2 |
| (United Kingdom) Sky - Tempesta with GruppeM Racing | Mercedes-AMG GT3 Evo | 93 | (Hong Kong) Jonathan Hui | G | 1–2 |
| (United States) Winward Racing | Mercedes-AMG GT3 Evo | 57 | (Austria) Lucas Auer | G | All |
| (United States) Winward Racing | Mercedes-AMG GT3 Evo | 57 | (Italy) Lorenzo Ferrari | G | All |
| (United States) Winward Racing | Mercedes-AMG GT3 Evo | 57 | (Germany) Jens Liebhauser | G | All |
| (United States) Winward Racing | Mercedes-AMG GT3 Evo | 57 | (United States) Russell Ward | G | 3 |
| (Germany) / Audi Sport Team Attempto (Note: Car No. 66 entered as Attempto Racing at rounds 1–2 and 4–5, and as Audi Sport Team Attempto at round 3. Car No. 99 entered as Attempto Racing at all rounds.); (Germany) / Attempto Racing | Audi R8 LMS Evo II | 66 | (Germany) Dennis Marschall | P | All |
| (Germany) / Audi Sport Team Attempto; (Germany) / Attempto Racing | Audi R8 LMS Evo II | 66 | (Germany) Markus Winkelhock | P | All |
| (Germany) / Audi Sport Team Attempto; (Germany) / Attempto Racing | Audi R8 LMS Evo II | 66 | (Finland) Juuso Puhakka | P | 1–2 |
| (Germany) / Audi Sport Team Attempto; (Germany) / Attempto Racing | Audi R8 LMS Evo II | 66 | (Switzerland) Ricardo Feller | P | 3 |
| (Germany) / Audi Sport Team Attempto; (Germany) / Attempto Racing | Audi R8 LMS Evo II | 66 | (Germany) Kim-Luis Schramm | P | 4–5 |
| (Germany) / Audi Sport Team Attempto; (Germany) / Attempto Racing | Audi R8 LMS Evo II | 99 | (Germany) Alex Aka | S | All |
| (Germany) / Audi Sport Team Attempto; (Germany) / Attempto Racing | Audi R8 LMS Evo II | 99 | (Austria) Nicolas Schöll | S | All |
| (Germany) / Audi Sport Team Attempto; (Germany) / Attempto Racing | Audi R8 LMS Evo II | 99 | (Germany) Marius Zug | S | All |
| (Germany) / Audi Sport Team Attempto; (Germany) / Attempto Racing | Audi R8 LMS Evo II | 99 | (Finland) Juuso Puhakka | S | 3 |
| (Australia) EMA Motorsport | Porsche 911 GT3 R | 74 | (Australia) Matt Campbell | P | 3 |
| (Australia) EMA Motorsport | Porsche 911 GT3 R | 74 | (France) Mathieu Jaminet | P | 3 |
| (Australia) EMA Motorsport | Porsche 911 GT3 R | 74 | (Brazil) Felipe Nasr | P | 3 |
| (United Kingdom) Barwell Motorsport | Lamborghini Huracán GT3 Evo | 77 | (United Kingdom) Alex MacDowall | G | 1–3 |
| (United Kingdom) Barwell Motorsport | Lamborghini Huracán GT3 Evo | 77 | (United Kingdom) Sandy Mitchell | G | 1–3 |
| (United Kingdom) Barwell Motorsport | Lamborghini Huracán GT3 Evo | 77 | (United Kingdom) Rob Collard | G | 1–2 |
| (United Kingdom) Barwell Motorsport | Lamborghini Huracán GT3 Evo | 77 | (United Kingdom) Sam De Haan | G | 3 |
| (United Kingdom) Barwell Motorsport | Lamborghini Huracán GT3 Evo | 77 | (Oman) Ahmad Al Harthy | G | 3 |
| (United Kingdom) Barwell Motorsport | Lamborghini Huracán GT3 Evo | 77 | (United Kingdom) Alex MacDowall | S | 4–5 |
| (United Kingdom) Barwell Motorsport | Lamborghini Huracán GT3 Evo | 77 | (United Kingdom) Sam De Haan | S | 4 |
| (United Kingdom) Barwell Motorsport | Lamborghini Huracán GT3 Evo | 77 | (Finland) Patrick Kujala | S | 4 |
| (United Kingdom) Barwell Motorsport | Lamborghini Huracán GT3 Evo | 77 | (United Kingdom) Jordan Witt | S | 5 |
| (United Kingdom) Barwell Motorsport | Lamborghini Huracán GT3 Evo | 77 | (United Kingdom) James Dorlin | S | 5 |
| (United Kingdom) Barwell Motorsport | Lamborghini Huracán GT3 Evo | 78 | (United Kingdom) Ben Barker | G | 1 |
| (United Kingdom) Barwell Motorsport | Lamborghini Huracán GT3 Evo | 78 | (United Kingdom) James Dorlin | G | 1 |
| (United Kingdom) Barwell Motorsport | Lamborghini Huracán GT3 Evo | 78 | Alex Malykhin | G | 1 |
| (France) / AMG Team AKKodis ASP (Note: Car No. 87 entered as AKKodis ASP Team. Car No. 88 entered as AMG Team AKKodis ASP.); (France) / AKKodis ASP Team | Mercedes-AMG GT3 Evo | 87 | (Italy) Tommaso Mosca | S | All |
| (France) / AMG Team AKKodis ASP; (France) / AKKodis ASP Team | Mercedes-AMG GT3 Evo | 87 | (United Kingdom) Casper Stevenson | S | All |
| (France) / AMG Team AKKodis ASP; (France) / AKKodis ASP Team | Mercedes-AMG GT3 Evo | 87 | Konstantin Tereshchenko | S | 1 |
| (France) / AMG Team AKKodis ASP; (France) / AKKodis ASP Team | Mercedes-AMG GT3 Evo | 87 | (France) Thomas Drouet | S | 2–5 |
| (France) / AMG Team AKKodis ASP; (France) / AKKodis ASP Team | Mercedes-AMG GT3 Evo | 88 | (France) Jules Gounon | P | All |
| (France) / AMG Team AKKodis ASP; (France) / AKKodis ASP Team | Mercedes-AMG GT3 Evo | 88 | (Spain) Daniel Juncadella | P | All |
| (France) / AMG Team AKKodis ASP; (France) / AKKodis ASP Team | Mercedes-AMG GT3 Evo | 88 | (Switzerland) Raffaele Marciello | P | All |
| (Spain) Madpanda Motorsport | Mercedes-AMG GT3 Evo | 90 | (Argentina) Ezequiel Pérez Companc | S | All |
| (Spain) Madpanda Motorsport | Mercedes-AMG GT3 Evo | 90 | (United Kingdom) Sean Walkinshaw | S | All |
| (Spain) Madpanda Motorsport | Mercedes-AMG GT3 Evo | 90 | (Serbia) Dušan Borković | S | 1 |
| (Spain) Madpanda Motorsport | Mercedes-AMG GT3 Evo | 90 | (Argentina) Franco Girolami | S | 2 |
| (Spain) Madpanda Motorsport | Mercedes-AMG GT3 Evo | 90 | (Finland) Patrick Kujala | S | 3 |
| (Spain) Madpanda Motorsport | Mercedes-AMG GT3 Evo | 90 | (Colombia) Óscar Tunjo | S | 3 |
| (Spain) Madpanda Motorsport | Mercedes-AMG GT3 Evo | 90 | (Germany) Patrick Assenheimer | S | 4 |
| (United Kingdom) Beechdean AMR | Aston Martin Vantage AMR GT3 | 95 | (Belgium) Maxime Martin | P | 1–3 |
| (United Kingdom) Beechdean AMR | Aston Martin Vantage AMR GT3 | 95 | (Denmark) Marco Sørensen | P | 1–3 |
| (United Kingdom) Beechdean AMR | Aston Martin Vantage AMR GT3 | 95 | (Denmark) Nicki Thiim | P | 1–3 |
| (United Kingdom) Beechdean AMR | Aston Martin Vantage AMR GT3 | 97 | (France) Valentin Hasse-Clot | G | 1–2 |
| (United Kingdom) Beechdean AMR | Aston Martin Vantage AMR GT3 | 97 | (United Kingdom) Andrew Howard | G | 1–2 |
| (United Kingdom) Beechdean AMR | Aston Martin Vantage AMR GT3 | 97 | (France) Théo Nouet | G | 1–2 |
| (United Kingdom) Beechdean AMR | Aston Martin Vantage AMR GT3 | 97 | (Canada) Roman De Angelis | S | 3 |
| (United Kingdom) Beechdean AMR | Aston Martin Vantage AMR GT3 | 97 | (United Kingdom) Charlie Fagg | S | 3 |
| (United Kingdom) Beechdean AMR | Aston Martin Vantage AMR GT3 | 97 | (France) Théo Nouet | S | 3 |
| (United Kingdom) Beechdean AMR | Aston Martin Vantage AMR GT3 | 97 | (United Kingdom) David Pittard | S | 3 |
| (Germany) Toksport WRT | Porsche 911 GT3 R | 100 | (France) Julien Andlauer | P | 3 |
| (Germany) Toksport WRT | Porsche 911 GT3 R | 100 | (Germany) Marvin Dienst | P | 3 |
| (Germany) Toksport WRT | Porsche 911 GT3 R | 100 | (Germany) Sven Müller | P | 3 |
| (France) CMR | Bentley Continental GT3 | 107 | (Belgium) Nigel Bailly | PA | 1–2 |
| (France) CMR | Bentley Continental GT3 | 107 | (Belgium) Stéphane Lémeret | PA | 1–2 |
| (France) CMR | Bentley Continental GT3 | 107 | (Belgium) Matthieu de Robiano | PA | 1–2 |
| (France) CMR | Bentley Continental GT3 | 107 | (Belgium) Nigel Bailly | G | 3 |
| (France) CMR | Bentley Continental GT3 | 107 | (Belgium) Stéphane Lémeret | G | 3 |
| (France) CMR | Bentley Continental GT3 | 107 | (Switzerland) Antonin Borga | G | 3 |
| (France) CMR | Bentley Continental GT3 | 107 | (Belgium) Maxime Soulet | G | 3 |
| (Poland) JP Motorsport | McLaren 720S GT3 | 111 | (Monaco) Vincent Abril | P | 1–2, 4–5 |
| (Poland) JP Motorsport | McLaren 720S GT3 | 111 | (Austria) Christian Klien | P | 1–2, 4–5 |
| (Poland) JP Motorsport | McLaren 720S GT3 | 111 | (Denmark) Dennis Lind | P | 1–2, 4–5 |
| (Poland) JP Motorsport | McLaren 720S GT3 | 112 | (Poland) Maciej Błażek | S | 1 |
| (Poland) JP Motorsport | McLaren 720S GT3 | 112 | (Germany) Christopher Brück | S | 1 |
| (Poland) JP Motorsport | McLaren 720S GT3 | 112 | (Poland) Patryk Krupiński | S | 1 |
| (Poland) JP Motorsport | McLaren 720S GT3 | 112 | (Poland) Maciej Błażek | G | 2, 4–5 |
| (Poland) JP Motorsport | McLaren 720S GT3 | 112 | (Poland) Patryk Krupiński | G | 2, 4–5 |
| (Poland) JP Motorsport | McLaren 720S GT3 | 112 | (United Kingdom) Joe Osborne | G | 2 |
| (Poland) JP Motorsport | McLaren 720S GT3 | 112 | (Austria) Norbert Siedler | G | 4–5 |
| (United Kingdom) Garage 59 | McLaren 720S GT3 | 159 | (Denmark) Nicolai Kjærgaard | S | All |
| (United Kingdom) Garage 59 | McLaren 720S GT3 | 159 | (Venezuela) Manuel Maldonado | S | All |
| (United Kingdom) Garage 59 | McLaren 720S GT3 | 159 | (Canada) Ethan Simioni | S | 1–3 |
| (United Kingdom) Garage 59 | McLaren 720S GT3 | 159 | (United Kingdom) James Baldwin | S | 3 |
| (United Kingdom) Garage 59 | McLaren 720S GT3 | 159 | (United Kingdom) Dean MacDonald | S | 4–5 |
| (United Kingdom) Garage 59 | McLaren 720S GT3 | 188 | (Portugal) Henrique Chaves | PA | All |
| (United Kingdom) Garage 59 | McLaren 720S GT3 | 188 | (Portugal) Miguel Ramos | PA | All |
| (United Kingdom) Garage 59 | McLaren 720S GT3 | 188 | (Sweden) Alexander West | PA | All |
| (United Kingdom) Garage 59 | McLaren 720S GT3 | 188 | (United Kingdom) Dean MacDonald | PA | 3 |
| (Italy) Vincenzo Sospiri Racing | Lamborghini Huracán GT3 Evo | 163 | (Belgium) Baptiste Moulin | S | All |
| (Italy) Vincenzo Sospiri Racing | Lamborghini Huracán GT3 Evo | 163 | (Norway) Marcus Påverud | S | All |
| (Italy) Vincenzo Sospiri Racing | Lamborghini Huracán GT3 Evo | 163 | (Mexico) Luis Michael Dörrbecker | S | 1–4 |
| (Italy) Vincenzo Sospiri Racing | Lamborghini Huracán GT3 Evo | 163 | (Italy) Mattia Michelotto | S | 3 |
| (Italy) Vincenzo Sospiri Racing | Lamborghini Huracán GT3 Evo | 163 | (Italy) Andrea Cola | S | 5 |
| (Italy) Vincenzo Sospiri Racing | Lamborghini Huracán GT3 Evo | 563 | (Italy) Michele Beretta | S | All |
| (Italy) Vincenzo Sospiri Racing | Lamborghini Huracán GT3 Evo | 563 | (Chile) Benjamín Hites | S | All |
| (Italy) Vincenzo Sospiri Racing | Lamborghini Huracán GT3 Evo | 563 | (Japan) Yuki Nemoto | S | All |
| (Italy) Vincenzo Sospiri Racing | Lamborghini Huracán GT3 Evo | 563 | (Poland) Karol Basz | S | 3 |
| (United Arab Emirates) GPX Martini Racing | Porsche 911 GT3 R | 221 | (Denmark) Michael Christensen | P | 3 |
| (United Arab Emirates) GPX Martini Racing | Porsche 911 GT3 R | 221 | (France) Kévin Estre | P | 3 |
| (United Arab Emirates) GPX Martini Racing | Porsche 911 GT3 R | 221 | (Austria) Richard Lietz | P | 3 |

| Icon | Class |
|---|---|
| P | Pro Cup |
| S | Silver Cup |
| G | Gold Cup |
| PA | Pro-Am Cup |
| B | Bronze Cup |

== Race results ==
| Round | Circuit | Pole position | Overall winners | Silver Cup winners | Pro/Am Cup winners | Gold Cup winners | Bronze Cup winners | Report |
|---|---|---|---|---|---|---|---|---|
| 1 | (Italy) Imola | (Belgium) #32 Team WRT | (Belgium) #32 Team WRT | (Belgium) #30 Team WRT | (Germany) #20 SPS Automotive Performance | (Germany) #911 Herberth Motorsport | No Entries | Report |
| 1 | (Italy) Imola | (South Africa) Kelvin van der Linde (Belgium) Dries Vanthoor (Belgium) Charles Weerts | (South Africa) Kelvin van der Linde (Belgium) Dries Vanthoor (Belgium) Charles Weerts | (Denmark) Benjamin Goethe (France) Thomas Neubauer (France) Jean-Baptiste Simmenauer | (Austria) Dominik Baumann (United Kingdom) Ian Loggie (Germany) Valentin Pierburg | (Germany) Ralf Bohn (Germany) Alfred Renauer (Germany) Robert Renauer | No Entries | Report |
| 2 | (France) Paul Ricard | (Italy) #71 Iron Lynx | (Italy) #71 Iron Lynx | (Oman) #777 Al Manar Racing by HRT | (Germany) #20 SPS Automotive Performance | (United Kingdom) #7 Inception Racing with Optimum Motorsport | No Entries | Report |
| 2 | (France) Paul Ricard | (Italy) Antonio Fuoco (Italy) Davide Rigon (Brazil) Daniel Serra | (Italy) Antonio Fuoco (Italy) Davide Rigon (Brazil) Daniel Serra | (Oman) Al Faisal Al Zubair (Zimbabwe) Axcil Jefferies (Germany) Fabian Schiller | (Austria) Dominik Baumann (Austria) Martin Konrad (Germany) Valentin Pierburg | (United States) Brendan Iribe (United Kingdom) Ollie Millroy (Denmark) Frederik Schandorff | No Entries | Report |
| 3 | (Belgium) Spa-Francorchamps | (France) #88 AMG Team AKKodis ASP | (France) #88 AMG Team AKKodis ASP | (Belgium) #30 Team WRT | (Italy) #52 AF Corse | (Italy) #83 Iron Dames | (Germany) #20 SPS Automotive Performance | Report |
| 3 | (Belgium) Spa-Francorchamps | (France) Jules Gounon (Spain) Daniel Juncadella (Switzerland) Raffaele Marciello | (France) Jules Gounon (Spain) Daniel Juncadella (Switzerland) Raffaele Marciello | (Denmark) Benjamin Goethe (France) Thomas Neubauer (France) Jean-Baptiste Simmenauer | (Italy) Andrea Bertolini (Italy) Stefano Costantini (Belgium) Louis Machiels (Italy) Alessio Rovera | (Belgium) Sarah Bovy (Switzerland) Rahel Frey (Denmark) Michelle Gatting (France) Doriane Pin | (Saudi Arabia) Reema Juffali (United States) George Kurtz (Germany) Tim Müller (Germany) Valentin Pierburg | Report |
| 4 | (Germany) Hockenheimring | (Belgium) #32 Team WRT | (France) #25 Saintéloc Junior Team | (Switzerland) #14 Emil Frey Racing | (Italy) #52 AF Corse | (United Kingdom) #7 Inception Racing with Optimum Motorsport | No Entries | Report |
| 4 | (Germany) Hockenheimring | (South Africa) Kelvin van der Linde (Belgium) Dries Vanthoor (Belgium) Charles Weerts | (Switzerland) Lucas Légeret (Germany) Christopher Mies (Switzerland) Patric Niederhauser | (Finland) Konsta Lappalainen (South Africa) Stuart White (Austria) Mick Wishofer | (Italy) Andrea Bertolini (Italy) Stefano Costantini (Belgium) Louis Machiels | (United States) Brendan Iribe (United Kingdom) Ollie Millroy (Denmark) Frederik Schandorff | No Entries | Report |
| 5 | (Spain) Barcelona | (Italy) #71 Iron Lynx | (Italy) #54 Dinamic Motorsport | (Belgium) #30 Team WRT | (Germany) #20 SPS Automotive Performance | (Poland) #112 JP Motorsport | No Entries | Report |
| 5 | (Spain) Barcelona | (Italy) Antonio Fuoco (Italy) Alessandro Pier Guidi (Italy) Alessio Rovera | (Austria) Klaus Bachler (Italy) Matteo Cairoli (Belgium) Alessio Picariello | (Denmark) Benjamin Goethe (France) Thomas Neubauer (France) Jean-Baptiste Simmenauer | (Austria) Dominik Baumann (United Kingdom) Ian Loggie (Germany) Valentin Pierburg | (Poland) Maciej Błażek (Poland) Patryk Krupińsk (Austria) Norbert Siedler | No Entries | Report |

== Championship standings ==
Scoring system

Championship points are awarded for the first ten positions in each race. The pole-sitter also receives one point and entries are required to complete 75% of the winning car's race distance in order to be classified and earn points. Individual drivers are required to participate for a minimum of 25 minutes in order to earn championship points in any race.

Imola, Hockenheim & Barcelona points

| Position | 1st | 2nd | 3rd | 4th | 5th | 6th | 7th | 8th | 9th | 10th | Pole |
| Points | 25 | 18 | 15 | 12 | 10 | 8 | 6 | 4 | 2 | 1 | 1 |

Paul Ricard points

| Position | 1st | 2nd | 3rd | 4th | 5th | 6th | 7th | 8th | 9th | 10th | Pole |
| Points | 33 | 24 | 19 | 15 | 12 | 9 | 6 | 4 | 2 | 1 | 1 |

24 Hours of Spa points

Points are awarded after six hours, after twelve hours and at the finish.

| Position | 1st | 2nd | 3rd | 4th | 5th | 6th | 7th | 8th | 9th | 10th | Pole |
| Points after 6hrs/12hrs | 12 | 9 | 7 | 6 | 5 | 4 | 3 | 2 | 1 | 0 | 1 |
| Points at the finish | 25 | 18 | 15 | 12 | 10 | 8 | 6 | 4 | 2 | 1 | 1 |

=== Drivers' Championship ===
==== Overall ====
| Pos. | Drivers | Team | IMO (Italy) | LEC (France) | SPA (Belgium) | | | HOC (Germany) | BAR (Spain) | Points |
| Pos. | Drivers | Team | IMO (Italy) | LEC (France) | 6hrs | 12hrs | 24hrs | HOC (Germany) | BAR (Spain) | Points |
|---|---|---|---|---|---|---|---|---|---|---|
| 1 | (France) Jules Gounon (Spain) Daniel Juncadella (Switzerland) Raffaele Marciello | (France) AMG Team AKKodis ASP | 2 | 3^{F} | 3 | 3 | 1^{1P} | 40^{†} | 5^{F} | 89 |
| 2 | (Italy) Antonio Fuoco | (Italy) Iron Lynx | 8 | 1^{P} | 2 | 4 | 3 | Ret | 2^{P} | 87 |
| 3 | (Italy) Davide Rigon | (Italy) Iron Lynx | 8 | 1^{P} | 2 | 4 | 3 | Ret | | 68 |
| 3 | (Brazil) Daniel Serra | (Italy) Iron Lynx | 8 | 1^{P} | 2 | 4 | 3 | | | 68 |
| 4 | (Austria) Klaus Bachler | (Italy) Dinamic Motorsport | 6 | Ret | 6 | Ret | Ret^{2} | 3 | 1 | 54 |
| 5 | (Germany) Luca Stolz (Netherlands) Steijn Schothorst | (Germany) AMG Team GetSpeed | 3 | Ret | 7 | 10 | 2^{3} | 4 | 8 | 53 |
| 6 | (Italy) Matteo Cairoli | (Italy) Dinamic Motorsport | 6 | Ret | | | | 3 | 1 | 48 |
| 7 | (Germany) Maro Engel | (Germany) AMG Team GetSpeed | 3 | Ret | | | | 4 | 8 | 44 |
| 7 | (Germany) Maro Engel | (Hong Kong) AMG Team GruppeM Racing | | | 10 | 9 | 4 | | | 44 |
| 8 | (Belgium) Alessio Picariello | (Germany) Herberth Motorsport | | 27 | 27 | 20 | 43^{†} | | | 40 |
| 8 | (Belgium) Alessio Picariello | (Italy) Dinamic Motorsport | | | | | | 3 | 1 | 40 |
| 9 | (Belgium) Dries Vanthoor (Belgium) Charles Weerts | (Belgium) Team WRT | 1^{P} | 41 | | | | Ret^{P} | 4 | 39 |
| 9 | (Belgium) Dries Vanthoor (Belgium) Charles Weerts | (Belgium) Audi Sport Team WRT | | | 14 | 14 | Ret | | | 39 |
| 10 | (Spain) Miguel Molina (Denmark) Nicklas Nielsen | (Italy) Iron Lynx | 7 | 2 | 5 | 11 | 9 | 43^{†} | 20 | 37 |
| 10 | (United Kingdom) James Calado | (Italy) Iron Lynx | 7 | 2 | 5 | 11 | 9 | 43^{†} | | 37 |
| 11 | (United Kingdom) Daniel Harper (Germany) Max Hesse (United States) Neil Verhagen | (Germany) ROWE Racing | 15 | 4 | 11 | 2 | 5 | 9 | 13 | 36 |
| 12 | (Brazil) Augusto Farfus (United Kingdom) Nick Yelloly | (Germany) ROWE Racing | 11 | 11 | 1 | 1 | 6 | 11 | 9 | 34 |
| 13 | (Switzerland) Lucas Légeret (Germany) Christopher Mies (Switzerland) Patric Niederhauser | (France) Saintéloc Junior Team | 9 | Ret | | | | 1 | 7 | 33 |
| 13 | (Switzerland) Lucas Légeret (Germany) Christopher Mies (Switzerland) Patric Niederhauser | (France) Audi Sport Team Saintéloc | | | 16 | 28 | 19 | | | 33 |
| 14 | (Netherlands) Nicky Catsburg | (Germany) ROWE Racing | 11 | 11 | 1 | 1 | 6 | 11 | | 32 |
| 15 | (United Kingdom) Jack Aitken (Italy) Mirko Bortolotti (Spain) Albert Costa | (Switzerland) Emil Frey Racing | 13 | 6 | 40 | Ret | Ret | 6^{F} | 3 | 32 |
| 16 | (Switzerland) Nico Müller (Italy) Valentino Rossi (Belgium) Frédéric Vervisch | (Belgium) Team WRT | 17 | 5 | 12 | 17 | 17 | 5 | 6 | 30 |
| 17 | (South Africa) Kelvin van der Linde | (Belgium) Team WRT | 1^{P} | 41 | | | | Ret^{P} | | 27 |
| 17 | (South Africa) Kelvin van der Linde | (Belgium) Audi Sport Team WRT | | | 14 | 14 | Ret | | | 27 |
| 18 | (Germany) Maximilian Götz | (Germany) AMG Team GetSpeed | | | 7 | 10 | 2^{3} | | | 22 |
| 19 | (Italy) Alessio Rovera | (Italy) AF Corse | | | 35 | 29 | 20^{F} | | | 19 |
| 19 | (Italy) Alessio Rovera | (Italy) Iron Lynx | | | | | | Ret | 2^{P} | 19 |
| 19 | (Italy) Alessandro Pier Guidi | (Italy) Iron Lynx | | | | | | | 2^{P} | 19 |
| 20 | (Germany) Dennis Marschall (Germany) Markus Winkelhock | (Germany) Attempto Racing | Ret | 10 | | | | 2 | Ret | 19 |
| 20 | (Germany) Dennis Marschall (Germany) Markus Winkelhock | (Germany) Audi Sport Team Attempto | | | 36 | 26 | 12 | | | 19 |
| 21 | (Germany) Kim-Luis Schramm | (Germany) Attempto Racing | | | | | | 2 | Ret | 18 |
| 22 | (France) Côme Ledogar | (Italy) Dinamic Motorsport | 6 | Ret | 6 | Ret | Ret^{2} | | | 14 |
| 23 | (Germany) Maximilian Buhk (Canada) Mikaël Grenier | (Hong Kong) AMG Team GruppeM Racing | | | 10 | 9 | 4 | | | 13 |
| 24 | (San Marino) Mattia Drudi (Italy) Luca Ghiotto (Germany) Christopher Haase | (Italy) Tresor by Car Collection | 4 | 12 | | | | 38^{†} | 42 | 12 |
| 24 | (San Marino) Mattia Drudi (Italy) Luca Ghiotto (Germany) Christopher Haase | (Italy) Audi Sport Team Tresor | | | Ret | Ret | Ret | | | 12 |
| 25 | (Norway) Dennis Olsen (United Kingdom) Nick Tandy (Belgium) Laurens Vanthoor | (Hong Kong) KCMG | | | 8 | 6 | 7 | | | 12 |
| 26 | (Monaco) Vincent Abril (Austria) Christian Klien (Denmark) Dennis Lind | (Poland) JP Motorsport | 5 | Ret | | | | 39^{†} | 38 | 10 |
| 27 | (United Kingdom) Rob Bell (Germany) Marvin Kirchhöfer (United Kingdom) Oliver Wilkinson | (United Kingdom) Jota Sport | 10 | Ret | 9 | 7 | 8 | Ret | 10 | 10 |
| 28 | (Austria) Thomas Preining | (Italy) Dinamic Motorsport | | | 6 | Ret | Ret^{2} | | | 6 |
| 29 | (Denmark) Michael Christensen (France) Kévin Estre (Austria) Richard Lietz | (United Arab Emirates) GPX Martini Racing | | | 4 | Ret | Ret | | | 6 |
| 30 | (Belgium) Maxime Martin (Denmark) Marco Sørensen (Denmark) Nicki Thiim | (United Kingdom) Beechdean AMR | 12^{F} | 13 | 18 | 5 | 10 | | | 6 |
| 31 | (Austria) Mick Wishofer | (Switzerland) Emil Frey Racing | | | | | | 7 | 14 | 6 |
| 31 | (Finland) Konsta Lappalainen (South Africa) Stuart White | (Switzerland) Emil Frey Racing | 28 | Ret | 17 | 18 | 16 | 7 | 14 | 6 |
| 31 | (Oman) Al Faisal Al Zubair (Zimbabwe) Axcil Jefferies (Germany) Fabian Schiller | (Oman) Al Manar Racing by HRT | 22 | 7 | Ret | Ret | Ret | 13 | 15 | 6 |
| 32 | (Germany) Alex Aka (Austria) Nicolas Schöll (Germany) Marius Zug | (Germany) Attempto Racing | 16 | 39 | 30 | 13 | 15 | 8 | 17 | 4 |
| 32 | (Italy) Tommaso Mosca (United Kingdom) Casper Stevenson | (France) AKKodis ASP Team | Ret | 8 | 54 | 44 | Ret | 16 | 22 | 4 |
| 32 | (France) Thomas Drouet | (France) AKKodis ASP Team | | 8 | 54 | 44 | Ret | 16 | 22 | 4 |
| 33 | (Australia) Matt Campbell (France) Mathieu Jaminet (Brazil) Felipe Nasr | (Australia) EMA Motorsport | | | 13 | 8 | 22 | | | 2 |
| 34 | (United States) Brendan Iribe (United Kingdom) Ollie Millroy (Denmark) Frederik Schandorff | (United Kingdom) Inception Racing with Optimum Motorsport | 38 | 9 | 38 | 38 | 27 | 15 | 35 | 2 |
| 35 | (Finland) Juuso Puhakka | (Germany) Attempto Racing | Ret | 10 | 30 | 13 | 15 | | | 1 |
| 35 | (Denmark) Benjamin Goethe (France) Thomas Neubauer (France) Jean-Baptiste Simmenauer | (Belgium) Team WRT | 14 | 15 | 15 | 19 | 13 | 10 | 11 | 1 |
| - | (Switzerland) Ricardo Feller | (Germany) Audi Sport Team Attempto | | | 36 | 26 | 12 | | | 0 |
| - | (Switzerland) Ricardo Feller | (Belgium) Team WRT | | | | | | | 4 (Note: Feller did not receive any points for this race in the official standings.) | 0 |
| - | (Austria) Philipp Eng | (Germany) ROWE Racing | | | | | | | 9 (Note: Eng did not receive any points for this race in the official standings.) | 0 |
| - | (Italy) Andrea Caldarelli (Italy) Marco Mapelli (South Africa) Jordan Pepper | (United States) Orange1 K-PAX Racing | | | 31 | 22 | 11 | | | 0 |
| - | (Belgium) Nicolas Baert (France) César Gazeau (France) Aurélien Panis | (France) Saintéloc Junior Team | 21 | 20 | Ret | Ret | Ret | 12 | 16 | 0 |
| - | (Germany) Jannes Fittje (Australia) Jordan Love (Switzerland) Alain Valente | (Germany) Haupt Racing Team | 37 | 16 | 20 | 12 | Ret | Ret | 25 | 0 |
| - | (United Kingdom) Frank Bird | (Germany) Haupt Racing Team | | | 20 | 12 | Ret | | | 0 |
| - | (Denmark) Nicolai Kjærgaard (Venezuela) Manuel Maldonado | (United Kingdom) Garage 59 | 20 | Ret | 43 | Ret | Ret | 18 | 12 | 0 |
| - | (United Kingdom) Dean MacDonald | (United Kingdom) Garage 59 | | | 29 | 24 | 41^{†} | 18 | 12 | 0 |
| - | (Italy) Giacomo Altoè (France) Arthur Rougier (France) Léo Roussel | (Switzerland) Emil Frey Racing | Ret | Ret | 22 | 15 | 14 | 14 | Ret | 0 |
| - | (United Kingdom) Finlay Hutchison (Mexico) Diego Menchaca (United Kingdom) Lewis Proctor | (Belgium) Team WRT | 27 | 14 | 59 | 49 | 39 | 37 | Ret | 0 |
| - | (Finland) Tuomas Tujula | (Switzerland) Emil Frey Racing | 28 | Ret | 17 | 18 | 16 | | | 0 |
| - | (France) Julien Andlauer (Germany) Marvin Dienst (Germany) Sven Müller | (Germany) Toksport WRT | | | 23 | 16 | Ret | | | 0 |
| - | (Belgium) Sarah Bovy (Switzerland) Rahel Frey (Denmark) Michelle Gatting | (Italy) Iron Dames | Ret | 17 | 28 | 21 | 18 | 22 | 43 | 0 |
| - | (Germany) Hubert Haupt (India) Arjun Maini (Germany) Florian Scholze | (Germany) Haupt Racing Team | 23 | Ret | 19 | Ret | Ret | 17 | 36 | 0 |
| - | (France) Doriane Pin | (Italy) Iron Dames | | | 28 | 21 | 18 | | | 0 |
| - | (Germany) Ralf Bohn (Germany) Alfred Renauer (Germany) Robert Renauer | (Germany) Herberth Motorsport | 18 | 19 | 24 | Ret | Ret | 20 | 29 | 0 |
| - | (France) Arnold Robin (France) Maxime Robin (Japan) Ryuichiro Tomita | (Belgium) Team WRT | Ret | 18 | 49 | 40 | 24 | 24 | 27 | 0 |
| - | (Italy) Michele Beretta (Chile) Benjamín Hites (Japan) Yuki Nemoto | (Italy) Vincenzo Sospiri Racing | 24 | Ret | 34 | 25 | 35 | 25 | 18 | 0 |
| - | (Italy) Alessandro Balzan (France) Hugo Delacour (Monaco) Cédric Sbirrazzuoli | (Italy) AF Corse | 19 | 21 | 52 | 47 | 33 | 19 | 44^{†} | 0 |
| - | (Italy) Gabriele Piana | (Germany) Haupt Racing Team | | | 19 | Ret | Ret | | | 0 |
| - | (France) Sébastien Baud (Denmark) Valdemar Eriksen (Canada) Jeff Kingsley | (Germany) GetSpeed Performance | Ret | 28 | 55 | Ret | Ret | 33 | 19 | 0 |
| - | (Canada) Ethan Simioni | (United Kingdom) Garage 59 | 20 | Ret | 43 | Ret | Ret | | | 0 |
| - | (Italy) Andrea Bertolini (Italy) Stefano Costantini (Belgium) Louis Machiels | (Italy) AF Corse | 33 | 26 | 35 | 29 | 20^{F} | 30 | 39 | 0 |
| - | (Switzerland) Nicolas Leutwiler | (Germany) Herberth Motorsport | | 27 | 27 | 20 | 43^{†} | | | 0 |
| - | (Germany) Stefan Aust (Germany) Nico Menzel | (Germany) Herberth Motorsport | | | 27 | 20 | 43^{†} | | | 0 |
| - | (Italy) Giancarlo Fisichella | (Italy) Iron Lynx | | | | | | | 20 | 0 |
| - | (Belgium) Baptiste Moulin (Norway) Marcus Påverud | (Italy) Vincenzo Sospiri Racing | 26 | 32 | 37 | 30 | 21 | 28 | 24 | 0 |
| - | (Mexico) Luis Michael Dörrbecker | (Italy) Vincenzo Sospiri Racing | 26 | 32 | 37 | 30 | 21 | 28 | | 0 |
| - | (Italy) Mattia Michelotto | (Italy) Vincenzo Sospiri Racing | | | 37 | 30 | 21 | | | 0 |
| - | (Italy) Lorenzo Patrese | (Italy) Tresor by Car Collection | 30 | 38 | 21 | Ret | Ret | Ret | 21 | 0 |
| - | (Italy) Daniele di Amato (Italy) Alberto Di Folco (France) Pierre-Alexandre Jean | (Italy) Tresor by Car Collection | | | 21 | Ret | Ret | | | 0 |
| - | (France) Hugo Valente | (Italy) Tresor by Car Collection | 30 | 38 | | | | Ret | 21 | 0 |
| - | (Austria) Lucas Auer (Italy) Lorenzo Ferrari (Germany) Jens Liebhauser | (United States) Winward Racing | Ret | 35 | 42 | 32 | 40^{†} | 21 | 33 | 0 |
| - | (Netherlands) Thierry Vermeulen | (Italy) Tresor by Car Collection | | | | | | Ret | 21 | 0 |
| - | (United Kingdom) Alex MacDowall | (United Kingdom) Barwell Motorsport | 40 | 22 | 39 | 34 | Ret | 29 | Ret | 0 |
| - | (United Kingdom) Sandy Mitchell | (United Kingdom) Barwell Motorsport | 40 | 22 | 39 | 34 | Ret | | | 0 |
| - | (United Kingdom) Rob Collard | (United Kingdom) Barwell Motorsport | 40 | 22 | | | | | | 0 |
| - | (Switzerland) Mauro Calamia | (Italy) Dinamic Motorsport | 29 | 23 | 33 | 35 | 25 | | | 0 |
| - | (Norway) Marius Nakken (Italy) Giorgio Roda | (Italy) Dinamic Motorsport | 29 | 23 | 33 | 35 | 25 | 26 | Ret | 0 |
| - | (Argentina) Ezequiel Pérez Companc (United Kingdom) Sean Walkinshaw | (Spain) Madpanda Motorsport | Ret | Ret | 26 | 23 | 23 | Ret | 23 | 0 |
| - | (Finland) Patrick Kujala | (Spain) Madpanda Motorsport | | | 26 | 23 | 23 | | | 0 |
| - | (Finland) Patrick Kujala | (United Kingdom) Barwell Motorsport | | | | | | 29 | | 0 |
| - | (Colombia) Óscar Tunjo | (Spain) Madpanda Motorsport | | | 26 | 23 | 23 | | | 0 |
| - | (France) Adam Eteki (Belgium) Benjamin Lessennes (Saudi Arabia) Karim Ojjeh | (Belgium) Boutsen Racing | 31 | 34 | 56 | Ret | Ret | 23 | 32 | 0 |
| - | (Germany) Valentin Pierburg | (Germany) SPS Automotive Performance | 32 | 24 | 53 | 46 | 34 | 31 | 31 | 0 |
| - | (Austria) Dominik Baumann | (Germany) SPS Automotive Performance | 32 | 24 | | | | 31 | 31 | 0 |
| - | (Austria) Dominik Baumann | (Australia) SunEnergy1 Racing by SPS | | | 46 | 39 | 28 | | | 0 |
| - | (Austria) Martin Konrad | (Germany) SPS Automotive Performance | | 24 | | | | | | 0 |
| - | (Austria) Martin Konrad | (Australia) SunEnergy1 Racing by SPS | | | 46 | 39 | 28 | | | 0 |
| - | (Austria) Martin Konrad | (United Kingdom) Sky - Tempesta Racing by HRT | | | | | | 32 | | 0 |
| - | (Portugal) Henrique Chaves (Portugal) Miguel Ramos (Sweden) Alexander West | (United Kingdom) Garage 59 | 34 | 25 | 29 | 24 | 41^{†} | 35 | 40 | 0 |
| - | (Belgium) Ulysse de Pauw | (Belgium) Team WRT | | | 49 | 40 | 24 | | | 0 |
| - | (Italy) Andrea Cola | (Italy) Vincenzo Sospiri Racing | | | | | | | 24 | 0 |
| - | (United Kingdom) James Dorlin | (United Kingdom) Barwell Motorsport | 25 | | | | | | Ret | 0 |
| - | (United Kingdom) James Dorlin | (Germany) Allied-Racing | | 30 | | | | | | 0 |
| - | (United Kingdom) Ben Barker | (United Kingdom) Barwell Motorsport | 25 | | | | | | | 0 |
| - | (United Kingdom) Ben Barker | (Germany) Allied-Racing | | 30 | | | | | | 0 |
| - | Alex Malykhin | (United Kingdom) Barwell Motorsport | 25 | | | | | | | 0 |
| - | Alex Malykhin | (Germany) Allied-Racing | | 30 | Ret | Ret | Ret | 36 | 34 | 0 |
| - | (Denmark) Mikkel O. Pedersen | (Italy) Dinamic Motorsport | | | 33 | 35 | 25 | 26 | Ret | 0 |
| - | (Poland) Karol Basz | (Italy) Vincenzo Sospiri Racing | | | 34 | 25 | 35 | | | 0 |
| - | (United States) Michael Dinan (United States) Robby Foley (United States) Richard Heistand (Germany) Jens Klingmann | (Germany) Walkenhorst Motorsport | | | 25 | 27 | 42^{†} | | | 0 |
| - | (Italy) Eddie Cheever III (United Kingdom) Chris Froggatt (Hong Kong) Jonathan Hui | (United Kingdom) Sky - Tempesta with GruppeM Racing | 35 | Ret | | | | | | 0 |
| - | (Italy) Eddie Cheever III (United Kingdom) Chris Froggatt (Hong Kong) Jonathan Hui | (United Kingdom) Sky - Tempesta Racing by HRT | | | 32 | 36 | 26 | 32 | 37 | 0 |
| - | (Italy) Loris Spinelli | (United Kingdom) Sky - Tempesta Racing by HRT | | | 32 | 36 | 26 | | | 0 |
| - | (Poland) Maciej Błażek (Poland) Patryk Krupiński | (Poland) JP Motorsport | Ret | 40 | | | | 27 | 26 | 0 |
| - | (Austria) Norbert Siedler | (Poland) JP Motorsport | | | | | | 27 | 26 | 0 |
| - | (Switzerland) Ivan Jacoma | (Germany) Herberth Motorsport | | 27 | | | | | | 0 |
| - | (Guernsey) Sebastian Priaulx | (United Kingdom) Inception Racing by Optimum Motorsport | | | 38 | 38 | 27 | | | 0 |
| - | (Switzerland) Philip Ellis (Australia) Kenny Habul | (Australia) SunEnergy1 Racing by SPS | | | 46 | 39 | 28 | | | 0 |
| - | (New Zealand) Brendon Leitch | (Germany) Leipert Motorsport | Ret | 37 | 47 | 43 | Ret | Ret | 28 | 0 |
| - | (Spain) Isaac Tutumlu | (Germany) Leipert Motorsport | | 37 | 47 | 43 | Ret | Ret | 28 | 0 |
| - | (United States) Tyler Cooke | (Germany) Leipert Motorsport | | 37 | 47 | 43 | Ret | | 28 | 0 |
| - | (Switzerland) Dominik Fischli (Denmark) Patrik Matthiesen (Germany) Joel Sturm | (Germany) Allied-Racing | 36 | 29 | 41 | 33 | 29 | 34 | | 0 |
| - | (Germany) Vincent Andronaco | (Germany) Allied-Racing | | | 41 | 33 | 29 | | | 0 |
| - | (United Kingdom) Sam De Haan | (United Kingdom) Barwell Motorsport | | | 39 | 34 | Ret | 29 | | 0 |
| - | (Finland) Axel Blom | (Italy) Tresor by Car Collection | 30 | 38 | | | | | | 0 |
| - | (Finland) Axel Blom | (Germany) GetSpeed Performance | | | 48 | 41 | 31 | | | 0 |
| - | (Thailand) Piti Bhirombhakdi (Thailand) Tanart Sathienthirakul | (Thailand) Singha Racing Team TP 12 | | 33 | 45 | 37 | 30 | | | 0 |
| - | (New Zealand) Earl Bamber (France) Christophe Hamon | (Thailand) Singha Racing Team TP 12 | | | 45 | 37 | 30 | | | 0 |
| - | (France) Loris Cabirou (France) Nicolas Gomar (France) Mike Parisy | (France) AGS Events | 39 | 36 | 44 | 42 | 32 | Ret | 30 | 0 |
| - | (France) Valentin Hasse-Clot (United Kingdom) Andrew Howard | (United Kingdom) Beechdean AMR | Ret | 31 | | | | | | 0 |
| - | (France) Théo Nouet | (United Kingdom) Beechdean AMR | Ret | 31 | Ret | Ret | Ret | | | 0 |
| - | (France) Michael Blanchemain (France) Jim Pla | (Germany) GetSpeed Performance | | | 48 | 41 | 31 | | | 0 |
| - | (Germany) Patrick Assenheimer | (Germany) GetSpeed Performance | | | 48 | 41 | 31 | | | 0 |
| - | (Germany) Patrick Assenheimer | (Spain) Madpanda Motorsport | | | | | | Ret | | 0 |
| - | (United Kingdom) Ian Loggie | (Germany) SPS Automotive Performance | 32 | | | | | 31 | 31 | 0 |
| - | (United States) Russell Ward | (United States) Winward Racing | | | 42 | 32 | 40^{†} | | | 0 |
| - | (Netherlands) Ruben del Sarte | (France) AGS Events | | | 44 | 42 | 32 | | | 0 |
| - | (New Zealand) Matthew Payne | (Thailand) Singha Racing Team TP 12 | | 33 | | | | | | 0 |
| - | (New Zealand) Matthew Payne | (New Zealand) EBM Giga Racing | | | 50 | Ret | Ret | | | 0 |
| - | (South Africa) David Perel | (Italy) AF Corse | | | 52 | 47 | 33 | | | 0 |
| - | (Saudi Arabia) Reema Juffali (United States) George Kurtz (Germany) Tim Müller | (Germany) SPS Automotive Performance | | | 53 | 46 | 34 | | | 0 |
| - | (Oman) Ahmad Al Harthy | (United Kingdom) Barwell Motorsport | | | 39 | 34 | Ret | | | 0 |
| - | (Turkey) Ayhancan Güven | (Germany) Allied-Racing | | | Ret | Ret | Ret | 36 | 34 | 0 |
| - | (United States) Harry Gottsacker (Netherlands) Maxime Oosten (Canada) Samantha Tan (Canada) Nick Wittmer | (Canada) ST Racing | | | 57 | 48 | 36 | | | 0 |
| - | (Germany) Jörg Breuer (Germany) Theo Oeverhaus (Germany) Henry Walkenhorst (United States) Don Yount | (Germany) Walkenhorst Motorsport | | | 51 | 45 | 37 | | | 0 |
| - | (Republic of Ireland) Charlie Eastwood (United Kingdom) Ross Gunn (Spain) Alex Riberas | (United Kingdom) Heart of Racing with TF Sport | | | 60 | 51 | 38 | | | 0 |
| - | (United Kingdom) Joe Osborne | (Poland) JP Motorsport | | 40 | | | | | | 0 |
| - | (Netherlands) Max Weering | (Germany) Leipert Motorsport | | | 47 | 43 | Ret | | | 0 |
| - | (United Kingdom) James Baldwin | (United Kingdom) Garage 59 | | | 43 | Ret | Ret | | | 0 |
| - | (Malaysia) Adrian D'Silva (Australia) Brenton Grove (Australia) Stephen Grove | (New Zealand) EBM Giga Racing | | | 50 | Ret | Ret | | | 0 |
| - | (France) Antoine Leclerc | (Belgium) Boutsen Racing | | | 56 | Ret | Ret | | | 0 |
| - | (Belgium) Nigel Bailly (Belgium) Stéphane Lémeret | (France) Classic & Modern Racing | Ret | WD | 58 | Ret | Ret | | | 0 |
| - | (Switzerland) Antonin Borga (Belgium) Maxime Soulet | (France) Classic & Modern Racing | | | 58 | Ret | Ret | | | 0 |
| - | (Hong Kong) Antares Au (New Zealand) Jaxon Evans (Luxembourg) Dylan Pereira (Macau) Kevin Tse | (Germany) Herberth Motorsport | | | 61 | Ret | Ret | | | 0 |
| - | (Belgium) Matthieu de Robiano | (France) Classic & Modern Racing | Ret | WD | | | | | | 0 |
| - | (Serbia) Dušan Borković | (Spain) Madpanda Motorsport | Ret | | | | | | | 0 |
| - | (Argentina) Franco Girolami | (Spain) Madpanda Motorsport | | Ret | | | | | | 0 |
| - | (Germany) Christopher Brück | (Poland) JP Motorsport | Ret | | | | | | | 0 |
| - | Konstantin Tereshchenko | (France) AKKodis ASP Team | Ret | | | | | | | 0 |
| - | (Germany) Dennis Fetzer | (Germany) Leipert Motorsport | Ret | | | | | | | 0 |
| - | (United Kingdom) Jordan Witt | (Germany) Leipert Motorsport | Ret | | | | | | | 0 |
| - | (United Kingdom) Jordan Witt | (United Kingdom) Barwell Motorsport | | | | | | | Ret | 0 |
| - | (Canada) Daniel Morad | (Oman) Al Manar Racing by HRT | | | Ret | Ret | Ret | | | 0 |
| - | (Canada) Roman De Angelis (United Kingdom) Charlie Fagg (United Kingdom) David Pittard | (United Kingdom) Beechdean AMR | | | Ret | Ret | Ret | | | 0 |
| - | (Switzerland) Julian Apothéloz (France) Florian Latorre | (Germany) Allied-Racing | | | Ret | Ret | Ret | | | 0 |
| - | (Belgium) Gilles Magnus | (France) Saintéloc Junior Team | | | Ret | Ret | Ret | | | 0 |
| - | (Germany) Jusuf Owega | (Germany) Leipert Motorsport | | | | | | Ret | | 0 |
| Pos. | Drivers | Team | IMO (Italy) | LEC (France) | 6hrs | 12hrs | 24hrs | HOC (Germany) | BAR (Spain) | Points |
| Pos. | Drivers | Team | IMO (Italy) | LEC (France) | SPA (Belgium) | | | HOC (Germany) | BAR (Spain) | Points |

Key
| Colour | Result |
|---|---|
| Gold | Race winner |
| Silver | 2nd place |
| Bronze | 3rd place |
| Green | Points finish |
| Blue | Non-points finish |
| Blue | Non-classified finish (NC) |
| Purple | Did not finish (Ret) |
| Black | Disqualified (DSQ) |
| Black | Excluded (EX) |
| White | Did not start (DNS) |
| White | Race cancelled (C) |
| White | Withdrew (WD) |
| Blank | Did not participate |

^{P} – Pole

^{F} – Fastest Lap

^{1} – 3 Points for Pole

^{2} – 2 Points for P2

^{3} – 1 Point for P3

Notes:

- † – Entry did not finish the race but was classified, as it completed more than 75% of the race distance.

==== Silver Cup ====
| Pos. | Drivers | Team | IMO (Italy) | LEC (France) | SPA (Belgium) | | | HOC (Germany) | BAR (Spain) | Points |
| Pos. | Drivers | Team | IMO (Italy) | LEC (France) | 6hrs | 12hrs | 24hrs | HOC (Germany) | BAR (Spain) | Points |
|---|---|---|---|---|---|---|---|---|---|---|
| 1 | (Denmark) Benjamin Goethe (France) Thomas Neubauer (France) Jean-Baptiste Simmenauer | (Belgium) Team WRT | 14 | 15^{P} | 15 | 19 | 13 | 10^{P} | 11 | 125 |
| 2 | (Germany) Alex Aka (Austria) Nicolas Schöll (Germany) Marius Zug | (Germany) Attempto Racing | 16^{PF} | 39 | 30 | 13 | 15 | 8 | 17 | 76 |
| 3 | (Finland) Konsta Lappalainen (South Africa) Stuart White | (Switzerland) Emil Frey Racing | 28 | Ret | 17 | 18 | 16 | 7 | 14 | 73 |
| 4 | (Oman) Al Faisal Al Zubair (Zimbabwe) Axcil Jefferies (Germany) Fabian Schiller | (Oman) Al Manar Racing by HRT | 22 | 7 | Ret | Ret | Ret^{P} | 13 | 15 | 66 |
| 5 | (Belgium) Nicolas Baert (France) César Gazeau (France) Aurélien Panis | (France) Saintéloc Junior Team | 21 | 20 | Ret | Ret | Ret | 12 | 16 | 43 |
| 6 | (Denmark) Nicolai Kjærgaard (Venezuela) Manuel Maldonado | (United Kingdom) Garage 59 | 20 | Ret | 43 | Ret | Ret | 18^{F} | 12^{P} | 40 |
| 7 | (Austria) Mick Wishofer | (Switzerland) Emil Frey Racing | | | | | | 7 | 14 | 40 |
| 8 | (Finland) Tuomas Tujula | (Switzerland) Emil Frey Racing | 28 | Ret | 17 | 18 | 16 | | | 33 |
| 9 | (Italy) Tommaso Mosca (United Kingdom) Casper Stevenson | (France) AKKodis ASP Team | Ret | 8^{F} | 54 | 44 | Ret | 16 | 22 | 33 |
| 9 | (France) Thomas Drouet | (France) AKKodis ASP Team | | 8^{F} | 54 | 44 | Ret | 16 | 22 | 33 |
| 10 | (Germany) Jannes Fittje (Australia) Jordan Love (Switzerland) Alain Valente | (Germany) Haupt Racing Team | 37 | 16 | 20 | 12 | Ret | Ret | 25 | 31 |
| 11 | (Finland) Juuso Puhakka | (Germany) Attempto Racing | | | 30 | 13 | 15 | | | 31 |
| 12 | (Italy) Michele Beretta (Chile) Benjamín Hites (Japan) Yuki Nemoto | (Italy) Vincenzo Sospiri Racing | 24 | Ret | 34 | 25 | 35 | 25 | 18 | 28 |
| 13 | (United Kingdom) Dean Macdonald | (United Kingdom) Garage 59 | | | | | | 18^{F} | 12^{P} | 25 |
| 14 | (United Kingdom) Finlay Hutchison (Mexico) Diego Menchaca (United Kingdom) Lewis Proctor | (Belgium) Team WRT | 27 | 14 | 59 | 49 | 39 | 37 | Ret | 24 |
| 15 | (Belgium) Baptiste Moulin (Norway) Marcus Påverud | (Italy) Vincenzo Sospiri Racing | 26 | 32 | 37 | 30 | 21 | 28 | 24 | 24 |
| 15 | (Mexico) Luis Michael Dörrbecker | (Italy) Vincenzo Sospiri Racing | 26 | 32 | 37 | 30 | 21 | 28 | | 24 |
| 16 | (Norway) Marius Nakken (Italy) Giorgio Roda | (Italy) Dinamic Motorsport | 29 | 23 | 33 | 35 | 25 | 26 | Ret^{F} | 21 |
| 17 | (Argentina) Ezequiel Pérez Companc (United Kingdom) Sean Walkinshaw | (Spain) Madpanda Motorsport | Ret | Ret | 26 | 23 | 23^{F} | Ret | 23 | 20 |
| 17 | (Finland) Patrick Kujala | (Spain) Madpanda Motorsport | | | 26 | 23 | 23^{F} | Ret | 23 | 20 |
| 17 | (Colombia) Óscar Tunjo | (Spain) Madpanda Motorsport | | | 26 | 23 | 23^{F} | | | 20 |
| 18 | (United Kingdom) Frank Bird | (Germany) Haupt Racing Team | | | 20 | 12 | Ret | | | 19 |
| 19 | (Switzerland) Mauro Calamia | (Italy) Dinamic Motorsport | 29 | 23 | 33 | 35 | 25 | | | 19 |
| 20 | (Italy) Mattia Michelotto | (Italy) Vincenzo Sospiri Racing | | | 37 | 30 | 21 | | | 16 |
| 21 | (Canada) Ethan Simioni | (United Kingdom) Garage 59 | 20 | Ret | 43 | Ret | Ret | | | 15 |
| 22 | (Denmark) Mikkel O. Pedersen | (Italy) Dinamic Motorsport | | | 33 | 35 | 25 | 26 | Ret^{F} | 12 |
| 23 | (Poland) Karol Basz | (Italy) Vincenzo Sospiri Racing | | | 34 | 25 | 35 | | | 10 |
| 24 | (Switzerland) Dominik Fischli (Denmark) Patrik Matthiesen (Germany) Joel Sturm | (Germany) Allied-Racing | 36 | 29 | 41 | 33 | 29 | 34 | | 10 |
| 25 | (Italy) Lorenzo Patrese | (Italy) Tresor by Car Collection | 30 | 38 | 21 | Ret | Ret | Ret | 21 | 8 |
| 26 | (Germany) Vincent Andronaco | (Germany) Allied-Racing | | | 41 | 33 | 29 | | | 8 |
| 27 | (France) Sébastien Baud (Denmark) Valdemar Eriksen (Canada) Jeff Kingsley | (Germany) GetSpeed Performance | Ret | 28 | 55 | Ret | Ret | 33 | 19 | 8 |
| 28 | (Italy) Daniele di Amato (Italy) Alberto Di Folco (France) Pierre-Alexandre Jean | (Italy) Tresor by Car Collection | | | 21 | Ret | Ret | | | 6 |
| 29 | (United States) Harry Gottsacker (Netherlands) Maxime Oosten (Canada) Samantha Tan (Canada) Nick Wittmer | (Canada) ST Racing | | | 57 | 48 | 36 | | | 2 |
| 29 | (France) Hugo Valente | (Italy) Tresor by Car Collection | 30 | 38 | | | | 42 | 21 | 2 |
| 30 | (Canada) Daniel Morad | (Oman) Al Manar Racing by HRT | | | Ret | Ret | Ret^{P} | | | 1 |
| - | (Netherlands) Thierry Vermeulen | (Italy) Tresor by Car Collection | | | | | | Ret | 21 | 0 |
| - | (Italy) Andrea Cola | (Italy) Vincenzo Sospiri Racing | | | | | | | 24 | 0 |
| - | (Spain) Isaac Tutumlu | (Germany) Leipert Motorsport | | 37 | 47 | 43 | Ret | Ret | 28 | 0 |
| - | (United States) Tyler Cooke | (Germany) Leipert Motorsport | | 37 | 47 | 43 | Ret | | 28 | 0 |
| - | (New Zealand) Brendon Leitch | (Germany) Leipert Motorsport | Ret | 37 | 47 | 43 | Ret | Ret | 28 | 0 |
| - | (United Kingdom) Alex MacDowall | (United Kingdom) Barwell Motorsport | | | | | | 29 | Ret | 0 |
| - | (United Kingdom) Sam De Haan | (United Kingdom) Barwell Motorsport | | | | | | 29 | | 0 |
| - | (Finland) Axel Blom | (Italy) Tresor by Car Collection | 30 | 38 | | | | | | 0 |
| - | (Netherlands) Max Weering | (Germany) Leipert Motorsport | | | 47 | 43 | Ret | | | 0 |
| - | (United Kingdom) James Baldwin | (United Kingdom) Garage 59 | | | 43 | Ret | Ret | | | 0 |
| - | (Serbia) Dušan Borković | (Spain) Madpanda Motorsport | Ret | | | | | | | 0 |
| - | (Argentina) Franco Girolami | (Spain) Madpanda Motorsport | | Ret | | | | | | 0 |
| - | Konstantin Tereshchenko | (France) AKKodis ASP | Ret | | | | | | | 0 |
| - | (Germany) Dennis Fetzer | (Germany) Leipert Motorsport | Ret | | | | | | | 0 |
| - | (United Kingdom) Jordan Witt | (Germany) Leipert Motorsport | Ret | | | | | | | 0 |
| - | (United Kingdom) Jordan Witt | (United Kingdom) Barwell Motorsport | | | | | | | Ret | 0 |
| - | (Poland) Maciej Błażek (Germany) Christopher Brück (Poland) Patryk Krupiński | (Poland) JP Motorsport | Ret | | | | | | | 0 |
| - | (Canada) Roman De Angelis (United Kingdom) Charlie Fagg (France) Théo Nouet (United Kingdom) David Pittard | (United Kingdom) Beechdean AMR | | | Ret | Ret | Ret | | | 0 |
| - | (Belgium) Gilles Magnus | (France) Saintéloc Junior Team | | | Ret | Ret | Ret | | | 0 |
| - | (Germany) Patrick Assenheimer | (Spain) Madpanda Motorsport | | | | | | Ret | | 0 |
| - | (Germany) Jusuf Owega | (Germany) Leipert Motorsport | | | | | | Ret | | 0 |
| - | (United Kingdom) James Dorlin | (United Kingdom) Barwell Motorsport | | | | | | | Ret | 0 |
| Pos. | Drivers | Team | IMO (Italy) | LEC (France) | 6hrs | 12hrs | 24hrs | HOC (Germany) | BAR (Spain) | Points |
| Pos. | Drivers | Team | IMO (Italy) | LEC (France) | SPA (Belgium) | | | HOC (Germany) | BAR (Spain) | Points |

==== Gold Cup ====
| Pos. | Drivers | Team | IMO (Italy) | LEC (France) | SPA (Belgium) | | | HOC (Germany) | BAR (Spain) | Points |
| Pos. | Drivers | Team | IMO (Italy) | LEC (France) | 6hrs | 12hrs | 24hrs | HOC (Germany) | BAR (Spain) | Points |
|---|---|---|---|---|---|---|---|---|---|---|
| 1 | (United States) Brendan Iribe (United Kingdom) Ollie Millroy (Denmark) Frederik Schandorff | (United Kingdom) Inception Racing with Optimum Motorsport | 38 | 9^{P} | 38 | 38 | 27 | 15 | 35^{F} | 90 |
| 2 | (Belgium) Sarah Bovy (Switzerland) Rahel Frey (Denmark) Michelle Gatting | (Italy) Iron Dames | Ret | 17 | 28 | 21 | 18 | 22 | 43^{P} | 77 |
| 3 | (Germany) Ralf Bohn (Germany) Alfred Renauer (Germany) Robert Renauer | (Germany) Herberth Motorsport | 18 | 19 | 24 | Ret | Ret | 20^{P} | 29 | 77 |
| 4 | (France) Arnold Robin (France) Maxime Robin (Japan) Ryuichiro Tomita | (Belgium) Team WRT | Ret | 18 | 49 | 40 | 24 | 24 | 27 | 61 |
| 5 | (Germany) Hubert Haupt (India) Arjun Maini (Germany) Florian Scholze | (Germany) Haupt Racing Team | 23 | Ret | 19 | 31^{†} | Ret | 17 | 36 | 56 |
| 6 | (Italy) Alessandro Balzan (France) Hugo Delacour (Monaco) Cédric Sbirrazzuoli | (Italy) AF Corse | 19 | 21 | 52 | 47 | 33 | 19 | 44^{†} | 51 |
| 7 | (France) Doriane Pin | (Italy) Iron Dames | | | 28 | 21 | 18 | | | 43 |
| 8 | (Italy) Eddie Cheever III (United Kingdom) Chris Froggatt | (United Kingdom) Sky - Tempesta with GruppeM Racing | 35 | Ret | | | | | | 35 |
| 8 | (Italy) Eddie Cheever III (United Kingdom) Chris Froggatt | (United Kingdom) Sky - Tempesta Racing by HRT | | | 32 | 36 | 26 | 32 | 37 | 35 |
| 9 | (Hong Kong) Jonathan Hui | (United Kingdom) Sky - Tempesta with GruppeM Racing | 35 | Ret | | | | | | 34 |
| 9 | (Hong Kong) Jonathan Hui | (United Kingdom) Sky - Tempesta Racing by HRT | | | 32 | 36 | 26 | | 37 | 34 |
| 10 | (Austria) Lucas Auer (Italy) Lorenzo Ferrari (Germany) Jens Liebhauser | (United States) Winward Racing | Ret^{P} | 35 | 42 | 32 | 40^{†} | 21^{F} | 33 | 31 |
| 11 | (Poland) Maciej Błażek (Poland) Patryk Krupiński | (Poland) JP Motorsport | | 40 | | | | 27 | 26 | 27 |
| 11 | (Austria) Norbert Siedler | (Poland) JP Motorsport | | | | | | 27 | 26 | 27 |
| 12 | (France) Adam Eteki (Belgium) Benjamin Lessennes (Saudi Arabia) Karim Ojjeh | (Belgium) Boutsen Racing | 31 | 34 | 56 | Ret | Ret | 23 | 32 | 27 |
| 13 | (France) Loris Cabirou (France) Nicolas Gomar (France) Mike Parisy | (France) AGS Events | 39 | 36 | 44 | 42 | 32 | 41 | 30 | 25 |
| 14 | (Italy) Loris Spinelli | (United Kingdom) Sky - Tempesta Racing by HRT | | | 32 | 36 | 26 | | | 24 |
| 15 | (United Kingdom) Alex MacDowall (United Kingdom) Sandy Mitchell | (United Kingdom) Barwell Motorsport | 40 | 22 | 39 | 34 | Ret^{P} | | | 20 |
| 16 | (Belgium) Ulysse de Pauw | (Belgium) Team WRT | | | 49 | 40 | 24 | | | 20 |
| 17 | (Italy) Gabriele Piana | (Germany) Haupt Racing Team | | | 19 | 31^{†} | Ret | | | 19 |
| 18 | (United Kingdom) Sebastian Priaulx | (United Kingdom) Inception Racing with Optimum Motorsport | | | 38 | 38 | 27 | | | 19 |
| 19 | (United States) Michael Dinan (United States) Robby Foley (United States) Richard Heistand (Germany) Jens Klingmann | (Germany) Walkenhorst Motorsport | | | 25 | 27 | 42^{F†} | | | 18 |
| 20 | Alex Malykhin | (United Kingdom) Barwell Motorsport | 25 | | | | | | | 18 |
| 20 | Alex Malykhin | (Germany) Allied-Racing | | 30^{F} | Ret | Ret | Ret | 36 | 34 | 18 |
| 20 | (United Kingdom) James Dorlin | (United Kingdom) Barwell Motorsport | 25 | | | | | | Ret | 18 |
| 20 | (United Kingdom) James Dorlin | (Germany) Allied-Racing | | 30^{F} | | | | | | 18 |
| 20 | (United Kingdom) Ben Barker | (United Kingdom) Barwell Motorsport | 25 | | | | | | | 18 |
| 20 | (United Kingdom) Ben Barker | (Germany) Allied-Racing | | 30^{F} | | | | | | 18 |
| 21 | (United States) Russell Ward | (United States) Winward Racing | | | 42 | 32 | 40^{†} | | | 12 |
| 22 | (France) Michael Blanchemain (Finland) Axel Blom (France) Jim Pla (Germany) Patrick Assenheimer | (Germany) GetSpeed Performance | | | 48 | 41 | 31 | | | 11 |
| 23 | (United Kingdom) Rob Collard | (United Kingdom) Barwell Motorsport | 40 | 22 | | | | | | 11 |
| 24 | (Oman) Ahmad Al Harthy (United Kingdom) Sam De Haan | (United Kingdom) Barwell Motorsport | | | 39 | 34 | Ret^{P} | | | 9 |
| 25 | (Netherlands) Ruben del Sarte | (France) AGS Events | | | 44 | 42 | 32 | | | 9 |
| 26 | (South Africa) David Perel | (Italy) AF Corse | | | 52 | 47 | 33 | | | 6 |
| 27 | (France) Valentin Hasse-Clot (United Kingdom) Andrew Howard (France) Théo Nouet | (United Kingdom) Beechdean AMR | Ret^{F} | 31 | | | | | | 4 |
| 28 | (Thailand) Piti Bhirombhakdi (New Zealand) Matthew Payne (Thailand) Tanart Sathienthirakul | (Thailand) Singha Racing Team TP 12 | | 33 | 45 | 37 | 30 | | | 2 |
| 29 | (Austria) Martin Konrad | (United Kingdom) Sky - Tempesta Racing by HRT | | | | | | 32 | | 1 |
| - | (United Kingdom) Joe Osborne | (Poland) JP Motorsport | | 40 | | | | | | 0 |
| - | (France) Antoine Leclerc | (Belgium) Boutsen Racing | | | 56 | Ret | Ret | | | 0 |
| - | (Belgium) Nigel Bailly (Switzerland) Antonin Borga (Belgium) Stéphane Lémeret (Belgium) Maxime Soulet | (France) Classic & Modern Racing | | | 58 | Ret | Ret | | | 0 |
| - | (Switzerland) Julian Apothéloz (Turkey) Ayhancan Güven (France) Florian Latorre | (Germany) Allied Racing | | | Ret | Ret | Ret | | | 0 |
| Pos. | Drivers | Team | IMO (Italy) | LEC (France) | 6hrs | 12hrs | 24hrs | HOC (Germany) | BAR (Spain) | Points |
| Pos. | Drivers | Team | IMO (Italy) | LEC (France) | SPA (Belgium) | | | HOC (Germany) | BAR (Spain) | Points |

==== Pro-Am Cup ====
| Pos. | Drivers | Team | IMO (Italy) | LEC (France) | SPA (Belgium) | | | HOC (Germany) | BAR (Spain) | Points |
| Pos. | Drivers | Team | IMO (Italy) | LEC (France) | 6hrs | 12hrs | 24hrs | HOC (Germany) | BAR (Spain) | Points |
|---|---|---|---|---|---|---|---|---|---|---|
| 1 | (Italy) Andrea Bertolini (Italy) Stefano Costantini (Belgium) Louis Machiels | (Italy) AF Corse | 33^{P} | 26 | 35 | 29 | 20^{PF} | 30 | 39 | 118 |
| 2 | (Austria) Dominik Baumann | (Germany) SPS Automotive Performance | 32 | 24 | | | | 31 | 31 | 101 |
| 2 | (Austria) Dominik Baumann | (Australia) SunEnergy1 Racing by SPS | | | 46 | 39 | 28 | | | 101 |
| 2 | (Germany) Valentin Pierburg | (Germany) SPS Automotive Performance | 32 | 24 | | | | 31 | 31 | 101 |
| 3 | (Portugal) Henrique Chaves (Portugal) Miguel Ramos (Sweden) Alexander West | (United Kingdom) Garage 59 | 34^{F} | 25^{PF} | 29 | 24 | 41^{†} | 35^{PF} | 40^{PF} | 99 |
| 4 | (United Kingdom) Ian Loggie | (Germany) SPS Automotive Performance | 32 | | | | | 31 | 31 | 68 |
| 5 | (Austria) Martin Konrad | (Germany) SPS Automotive Performance | | 24 | | | | | | 61 |
| 5 | (Austria) Martin Konrad | (Australia) SunEnergy1 Racing by SPS | | | 46 | 39 | 28 | | | 61 |
| 6 | (Switzerland) Nicolas Leutwiler (Belgium) Alessio Picariello | (Germany) Herberth Motorsport | | 27 | 27 | 20 | 43^{†} | | | 49 |
| 7 | (Italy) Alessio Rovera | (Italy) AF Corse | | | 35 | 29 | 20^{PF} | | | 40 |
| 8 | (Germany) Stefan Aust (Germany) Nico Menzel | (Germany) Herberth Motorsport | | | 27 | 20 | 43^{†} | | | 34 |
| 9 | (United Kingdom) Dean MacDonald | (United Kingdom) Garage 59 | | | 29 | 24 | 41^{†} | | | 30 |
| 10 | (Switzerland) Philip Ellis (Australia) Kenny Habul | (Australia) SunEnergy1 Racing by SPS | | | 46 | 39 | 28 | | | 28 |
| 11 | (New Zealand) Earl Bamber (Thailand) Piti Bhirombhakdi (France) Christophe Hamon (Thailand) Tanart Sathienthirakul | (Thailand) Singha Racing Team TP 12 | | | 45 | 37 | 30 | | | 27 |
| 13 | (Switzerland) Ivan Jacoma | (Germany) Herberth Motorsport | | 27 | | | | | | 15 |
| 14 | (Malaysia) Adrian D'Silva (Australia) Brenton Grove (Australia) Stephen Grove (New Zealand) Matthew Payne | (New Zealand) EBM Giga Racing | | | 50 | 53^{†} | Ret | | | 8 |
| 15 | (Hong Kong) Antares Au (New Zealand) Jaxon Evans (Luxembourg) Dylan Pereira (Macau) Kevin Tse | (Germany) Herberth Motorsport | | | 61 | 61^{†} | Ret | | | 6 |
| - | (Belgium) Nigel Bailly (Belgium) Stéphane Lémeret (Belgium) Matthieu de Robiano | (France) Classic & Modern Racing | Ret | WD | | | | | | 0 |
| Pos. | Drivers | Team | IMO (Italy) | LEC (France) | 6hrs | 12hrs | 24hrs | HOC (Germany) | BAR (Spain) | Points |
| Pos. | Drivers | Team | IMO (Italy) | LEC (France) | SPA (Belgium) | | | HOC (Germany) | BAR (Spain) | Points |

=== Team's championships ===
==== Overall ====
| Pos. | Team | Manufacturer | IMO (Italy) | LEC (France) | SPA (Belgium) | | | HOC (Germany) | BAR (Spain) | Points |
| Pos. | Team | Manufacturer | IMO (Italy) | LEC (France) | 6hrs | 12hrs | 24hrs | HOC (Germany) | BAR (Spain) | Points |
|---|---|---|---|---|---|---|---|---|---|---|
| 1 | (France) AKKodis ASP Team | (Germany) Mercedes-AMG | 2 | 3^{F} | | | | | | 42 |
| 2 | (Belgium) Team WRT | (Germany) Audi | 1^{P} | 5 | | | | | | 41 |
| 3 | (Italy) Iron Lynx | (Italy) Ferrari | 7 | 1^{P} | | | | | | 40 |
| 4 | (Germany) ROWE Racing | (Germany) BMW | 11 | 4 | | | | | | 20 |
| 5 | (Germany) GetSpeed Performance | (Germany) Mercedes-AMG | 3 | 28 | | | | | | 15 |
| 6 | (Italy) Tresor by Car Collection | (Germany) Audi | 4 | 12 | | | | | | 14 |
| 7 | (Switzerland) Emil Frey Racing | (Italy) Lamborghini | 13 | 6 | | | | | | 12 |
| 8 | (Poland) JP Motorsport | (United Kingdom) McLaren | 5 | 40 | | | | | | 10 |
| 9 | (Germany) Haupt Racing Team | (Germany) Mercedes-AMG | 22 | 7 | | | | | | 9 |
| 10 | (Italy) Dinamic Motorsport | (Germany) Porsche | 6 | 23 | | | | | | 8 |
| 11 | (United Kingdom) Inception Racing with Optimum Motorsport | (United Kingdom) McLaren | 38 | 9 | | | | | | 6 |
| 12 | (France) Saintéloc Junior Team | (Germany) Audi | 9 | 20 | | | | | | 4 |
| 12 | (Germany) Attempto Racing | (Germany) Audi | 16 | 10 | | | | | | 4 |
| 13 | (United Kingdom) Jota Sport | (United Kingdom) McLaren | 10 | Ret | | | | | | 2 |
| 14 | (United Kingdom) Beechdean AMR | (United Kingdom) Aston Martin | 12^{F} | 13 | | | | | | 1 |
| - | (Germany) Herberth Motorsport | (Germany) Porsche | 18 | 19 | | | | | | 0 |
| - | (Italy) AF Corse | (Italy) Ferrari | 19 | 21 | | | | | | 0 |
| - | (United Kingdom) Garage 59 | (United Kingdom) McLaren | 20 | 25 | | | | | | 0 |
| - | (Italy) Vincenzo Sospiri Racing | (Italy) Lamborghini | 24 | 32 | | | | | | 0 |
| - | (United Kingdom) Barwell Motorsport | (Italy) Lamborghini | 25 | 22 | | | | | | 0 |
| - | (Belgium) Boutsen Racing | (Germany) Audi | 31 | 34 | | | | | | 0 |
| - | (Germany) SPS Automotive Performance | (Germany) Mercedes-AMG | 32 | 24 | | | | | | 0 |
| - | (United Kingdom) Sky - Tempesta with GruppeM Racing | (Germany) Mercedes-AMG | 35 | Ret | | | | | | 0 |
| - | (Germany) Allied-Racing | (Germany) Porsche | 36 | 29 | | | | | | 0 |
| - | (France) AGS Events | (Italy) Lamborghini | 39 | 36 | | | | | | 0 |
| - | (Germany) Leipert Motorsport | (Italy) Lamborghini | Ret | 37 | | | | | | 0 |
| - | (France) Classic & Modern Racing | (United Kingdom) Bentley | Ret | WD | | | | | | 0 |
| - | (Spain) Madpanda Motorsport | (Germany) Mercedes-AMG | Ret | Ret | | | | | | 0 |
| - | (United States) Winward Racing | (Germany) Mercedes-AMG | Ret | 35 | | | | | | 0 |
| - | (Thailand) Singha Racing Team TP 12 | (Germany) Porsche | | 33 | | | | | | 0 |
| Pos. | Team | Manufacturer | IMO (Italy) | LEC (France) | 6hrs | 12hrs | 24hrs | HOC (Germany) | BAR (Spain) | Points |
| Pos. | Team | Manufacturer | IMO (Italy) | LEC (France) | SPA (Belgium) | | | HOC (Germany) | BAR (Spain) | Points |

==== Silver Cup ====
| Pos. | Team | Manufacturer | IMO (Italy) | LEC (France) | SPA (Belgium) | | | HOC (Germany) | BAR (Spain) | Points |
| Pos. | Team | Manufacturer | IMO (Italy) | LEC (France) | 6hrs | 12hrs | 24hrs | HOC (Germany) | BAR (Spain) | Points |
|---|---|---|---|---|---|---|---|---|---|---|
| 1 | (Belgium) Team WRT | (Germany) Audi | 14 | 14^{P} | | | | | | 45 |
| 2 | (Oman) Al Manar Racing by HRT | (Germany) Mercedes-AMG | 22 | 7 | | | | | | 43 |
| 3 | (France) AKKodis ASP Team | (Germany) Mercedes-AMG | Ret | 8^{F} | | | | | | 24 |
| 4 | (France) Saintéloc Junior Team | (Germany) Audi | 21 | 20 | | | | | | 24 |
| 5 | (Germany) Attempto Racing | (Germany) Audi | 16^{P} | 39 | | | | | | 19 |
| 6 | (United Kingdom) Garage 59 | (United Kingdom) McLaren | 20 | Ret | | | | | | 15 |
| 7 | (Germany) Haupt Racing Team | (Germany) Mercedes-AMG | 37 | 16 | | | | | | 15 |
| 8 | (Italy) Dinamic Motorsport | (Germany) Porsche | 29 | 23 | | | | | | 13 |
| 9 | (Italy) Vincenzo Sospiri Racing | (Italy) Lamborghini | 24 | 32 | | | | | | 10 |
| 10 | (Germany) GetSpeed Performance | (Germany) Mercedes-AMG | Ret | 28 | | | | | | 6 |
| 10 | (Switzerland) Emil Frey Racing | (Italy) Lamborghini | 28 | Ret | | | | | | 6 |
| 11 | (Germany) Allied-Racing | (Germany) Porsche | 36 | 29 | | | | | | 5 |
| 12 | (Italy) Tresor by Car Collection | (Germany) Audi | 30 | 38 | | | | | | 2 |
| 13 | (Germany) Leipert Motorsport | (Italy) Lamborghini | Ret | 37 | | | | | | 1 |
| 14 | (Spain) Madpanda Motorsport | (Germany) Mercedes-AMG | Ret | Ret | | | | | | 0 |
| - | (Poland) JP Motorsport | (United Kingdom) McLaren | Ret | | | | | | | 0 |
| Pos. | Team | Manufacturer | IMO (Italy) | LEC (France) | 6hrs | 12hrs | 24hrs | HOC (Germany) | BAR (Spain) | Points |
| Pos. | Team | Manufacturer | IMO (Italy) | LEC (France) | SPA (Belgium) | | | HOC (Germany) | BAR (Spain) | Points |

==== Gold Cup ====
| Pos. | Team | Manufacturer | IMO (Italy) | LEC (France) | SPA (Belgium) | | | HOC (Germany) | BAR (Spain) | Points |
| Pos. | Team | Manufacturer | IMO (Italy) | LEC (France) | 6hrs | 12hrs | 24hrs | HOC (Germany) | BAR (Spain) | Points |
|---|---|---|---|---|---|---|---|---|---|---|
| 1 | (United Kingdom) Inception Racing with Optimum Motorsport | (United Kingdom) McLaren | 38 | 9^{P} | | | | | | 40 |
| 2 | (Germany) Herberth Motorsport | (Germany) Porsche | 18 | 19 | | | | | | 40 |
| 3 | (Italy) AF Corse | (Italy) Ferrari | 19 | 21 | | | | | | 30 |
| 4 | (Italy) Iron Dames | (Italy) Ferrari | Ret | 17 | | | | | | 24 |
| 5 | (United Kingdom) Barwell Motorsport | (Italy) Lamborghini | 25 | 22 | | | | | | 21 |
| 6 | (Belgium) Team WRT | (Germany) Audi | Ret | 18 | | | | | | 19 |
| 7 | (Germany) Haupt Racing Team | (Germany) Mercedes-AMG | 23 | Ret | | | | | | 15 |
| 8 | (Belgium) Boutsen Racing | (Germany) Audi | 31 | 34 | | | | | | 11 |
| 9 | (United Kingdom) Sky - Tempesta with GruppeM Racing | (Germany) Mercedes-AMG | 35 | Ret | | | | | | 8 |
| 10 | (Germany) Allied-Racing | (Germany) Porsche | | 30^{F} | | | | | | 6 |
| 11 | (France) AGS Events | (Italy) Lamborghini | 39 | 36 | | | | | | 4 |
| 11 | (United Kingdom) Beechdean AMR | (United Kingdom) Aston Martin | Ret^{F} | 31 | | | | | | 4 |
| 12 | (Thailand) Singha Racing Team TP 12 | (Germany) Porsche | | 33 | | | | | | 2 |
| 13 | (United States) Winward Racing | (Germany) Mercedes-AMG | Ret^{P} | 35 | | | | | | 1 |
| - | (Poland) JP Motorsport | (United Kingdom) McLaren | | 40 | | | | | | 0 |
| Pos. | Team | Manufacturer | IMO (Italy) | LEC (France) | 6hrs | 12hrs | 24hrs | HOC (Germany) | BAR (Spain) | Points |
| Pos. | Team | Manufacturer | IMO (Italy) | LEC (France) | SPA (Belgium) | | | HOC (Germany) | BAR (Spain) | Points |

==== Pro-Am Cup ====
| Pos. | Team | Manufacturer | IMO (Italy) | LEC (France) | SPA (Belgium) | | | HOC (Germany) | BAR (Spain) | Points |
| Pos. | Team | Manufacturer | IMO (Italy) | LEC (France) | 6hrs | 12hrs | 24hrs | HOC (Germany) | BAR (Spain) | Points |
|---|---|---|---|---|---|---|---|---|---|---|
| 1 | (Germany) SPS Automotive Performance | (Germany) Mercedes-AMG | 32 | 24 | | | | | | 58 |
| 2 | (United Kingdom) Garage 59 | (United Kingdom) McLaren | 34^{F} | 25^{PF} | | | | | | 40 |
| 3 | (Italy) AF Corse | (Italy) Ferrari | 33^{P} | 26 | | | | | | 38 |
| 4 | (Germany) Herberth Motorsport | (Germany) Porsche | | 27 | | | | | | 15 |
| - | (France) Classic & Modern Racing | (United Kingdom) Bentley | Ret | WD | | | | | | 0 |
| Pos. | Team | Manufacturer | IMO (Italy) | LEC (France) | 6hrs | 12hrs | 24hrs | HOC (Germany) | BAR (Spain) | Points |
| Pos. | Team | Manufacturer | IMO (Italy) | LEC (France) | SPA (Belgium) | | | HOC (Germany) | BAR (Spain) | Points |

== See also ==
- 2022 British GT Championship
- 2022 GT World Challenge Europe
- 2022 GT World Challenge Europe Sprint Cup
- 2022 GT World Challenge Asia
- 2022 GT World Challenge America
- 2022 GT World Challenge Australia
- 2022 Intercontinental GT Challenge
- SRO GT Anniversary
