= 2022 International GT Open =

Car racing competition

The 2022 International GT Open was the seventeenth season of the International GT Open, the grand tourer-style sports car racing series founded in 2006 by the Spanish GT Sport Organización. It began on 1 May at the Circuito do Estoril and ended at the Circuit de Barcelona-Catalunya on 16 October after seven rounds of two races each.

== Entry list ==
Team	Car	No.	Drivers	Class	Rounds
(Belgium) Street Art Racing	Aston Martin Vantage AMR GT3	007	(Switzerland) Pascal Bachmann	Am	2, 6–7
(Belgium) Street Art Racing	Aston Martin Vantage AMR GT3	007	(Switzerland) Pascal Bachmann	PA	4
(Belgium) Street Art Racing	Aston Martin Vantage AMR GT3	007	(France) Julien Darras	PA	4
(Germany) Aust Motorsport	Audi R8 LMS Evo II	3	(Austria) Max Hofer	PA	2–3, 5, 7
(Germany) Aust Motorsport	Audi R8 LMS Evo II	3	(Germany) Dino Steiner	PA	2–3, 5, 7
(Germany) Haupt Racing Team	Mercedes-AMG GT3 Evo	4	(Australia) Jordan Love	P	3
(Germany) Haupt Racing Team	Mercedes-AMG GT3 Evo	4	(United Kingdom) Frank Bird	P	3
(United Kingdom) Optimum Motorsport	McLaren 720S GT3	4	(Morocco) Michaël Benyahia (Note: Drivers who started their first race of the season at the final round are ineligible for points and invisible as far as awarding points to other drivers.)	P	7
(United Kingdom) Optimum Motorsport	McLaren 720S GT3	4	(United Kingdom) Finlay Hutchison	P	7
(United Kingdom) Optimum Motorsport	McLaren 720S GT3	72	(United Kingdom) Nick Moss	P	All
(United Kingdom) Optimum Motorsport	McLaren 720S GT3	72	(United Kingdom) Joe Osborne	P	All
(Poland) Olimp Racing	Ferrari 488 GT3 Evo 2020	5	(Poland) Stanislaw Jedlinski	Am	All
(Poland) Olimp Racing	Ferrari 488 GT3 Evo 2020	5	(Poland) Krystian Korzeniowski	Am	All
(Poland) Olimp Racing	Audi R8 LMS Evo II	777	(Poland) Karol Basz	PA	All
(Poland) Olimp Racing	Audi R8 LMS Evo II	777	(Poland) Marcin Jedlinski	PA	All
(Italy) Barone Rampante	Lamborghini Huracán GT3 Evo	8	(Italy) Giuseppe Cipriani	Am	2, 4–7
(Italy) Barone Rampante	Lamborghini Huracán GT3 Evo	8	(Italy) Giuseppe Cipriani	PA	1
(Italy) Barone Rampante	Lamborghini Huracán GT3 Evo	8	(Italy) Alex Frassineti	PA	1
(Germany) GetSpeed Performance	Mercedes-AMG GT3 Evo	9	(Germany) Moritz Kranz	PA	1–6
(Germany) GetSpeed Performance	Mercedes-AMG GT3 Evo	9	(United Kingdom) Janine Shoffner	PA	1–6
(Germany) GetSpeed Performance	Mercedes-AMG GT3 Evo	77	(Oman) Al Faisal Al Zubair	P	7
(Germany) GetSpeed Performance	Mercedes-AMG GT3 Evo	77	(Germany) Fabian Schiller	P	7
(Germany) GetSpeed Performance	Mercedes-AMG GT3 Evo	786	(Thailand) Kiki Sak Nana	Am	All
(Germany) GetSpeed Performance	Mercedes-AMG GT3 Evo	786	(Germany) Adam Osieka	Am	All
(Germany) GetSpeed Performance	Mercedes-AMG GT3 Evo	911	(France) Sébastien Baud	PA	All
(Germany) GetSpeed Performance	Mercedes-AMG GT3 Evo	911	(Luxembourg) Steve Jans	PA	All
(Switzerland) Kessel Racing	Ferrari 488 GT3 Evo 2020	11	(United States) Stephen Earle	Am	All
(Switzerland) Kessel Racing	Ferrari 488 GT3 Evo 2020	11	(Italy) Erwin Zanotti	Am	All
(Switzerland) Kessel Racing	Ferrari 488 GT3 Evo 2020	73	(Zimbabwe) Axcil Jefferies	PA	1–2, 4–6
(Switzerland) Kessel Racing	Ferrari 488 GT3 Evo 2020	73	(Poland) Roman Ziemian	PA	1–2, 4–6
(Switzerland) Kessel Racing	Ferrari 488 GT3 Evo 2020	77	(United Kingdom) Charlie Hollings	PA	1–3, 6
(Switzerland) Kessel Racing	Ferrari 488 GT3 Evo 2020	77	(United Kingdom) Omar Jackson	PA	1–3, 6
(Switzerland) Kessel Racing	Ferrari 488 GT3 Evo 2020	133	(Turkey) Murat Ruhi Cuhadaroglu	PA	All
(Switzerland) Kessel Racing	Ferrari 488 GT3 Evo 2020	133	(Italy) David Fumanelli	PA	All
(Germany) Twin Busch by Équipe Vitesse	Mercedes-AMG GT3 Evo	15	(Germany) Mario Hirsch	PA	5
(Germany) Twin Busch by Équipe Vitesse	Mercedes-AMG GT3 Evo	15	(Austria) Dominik Schraml	PA	5
(Italy) Dinamic Motorsport	Porsche 911 GT3 R	15	(Austria) Philipp Sager	Am	7
(Italy) Dinamic Motorsport	Porsche 911 GT3 R	15	(Canada) Bashar Mardini	Am	7
(Italy) Dinamic Motorsport	Porsche 911 GT3 R	24	(Austria) Klaus Bachler	P	6–7
(Italy) Dinamic Motorsport	Porsche 911 GT3 R	24	(Italy) Riccardo Cazzaniga	P	6–7
(Slovakia) Racing Team Trevor	BMW M4 GT3	16	(Finland) Jesse Krohn	PA	4
(Slovakia) Racing Team Trevor	BMW M4 GT3	16	(Czech Republic) Dennis Waszek	PA	4
(Italy) Antonelli Motorsport	Mercedes-AMG GT3 Evo	17	(Italy) Marco Antonelli	Am	5
(Italy) Antonelli Motorsport	Mercedes-AMG GT3 Evo	17	(Germany) Florian Scholze	Am	5
(Saudi Arabia) Theeba Motorsport	Mercedes-AMG GT3 Evo	18	(United Kingdom) Adam Christodoulou	PA	All
(Saudi Arabia) Theeba Motorsport	Mercedes-AMG GT3 Evo	18	(Saudi Arabia) Reema Juffali	PA	All
(Italy) Oregon Team	Lamborghini Huracán GT3 Evo	19	(Netherlands) Glenn Van Berlo	P	All
(Italy) Oregon Team	Lamborghini Huracán GT3 Evo	19	(Italy) Kevin Gilardoni	P	All
(Italy) Oregon Team	Lamborghini Huracán GT3 Evo	63	(Italy) Leonardo Pulcini	P	All
(Italy) Oregon Team	Lamborghini Huracán GT3 Evo	63	(Chile) Benjamín Hites	P	All
(Germany) SPS automotive performance	Mercedes-AMG GT3 Evo	20	(Austria) Dominik Baumann	PA	4
(Germany) SPS automotive performance	Mercedes-AMG GT3 Evo	20	(Germany) Valentin Pierburg	PA	4
(Germany) SPS automotive performance	Mercedes-AMG GT3 Evo	54	(Switzerland) Yannick Mettler	PA	All
(Germany) SPS automotive performance	Mercedes-AMG GT3 Evo	54	(Switzerland) Dexter Müller	PA	All
(Germany) Mann Filter Team Landgraf	Mercedes-AMG GT3 Evo	25	(Austria) Alexander Hrachowina	Am	All
(Germany) Mann Filter Team Landgraf	Mercedes-AMG GT3 Evo	25	(Austria) Martin Konrad	Am	All
(Hungary) GFS Motorsport	Aston Martin V12 Vantage GT3	27	(Hungary) János Sánta	Am	4
(Germany) Team GT	Mercedes-AMG GT3 Evo	33	(Switzerland) Alain Valente	PA	All
(Germany) Team GT	Mercedes-AMG GT3 Evo	33	(Germany) Bernhard Laber	PA	1–2, 5
(Germany) Team GT	Mercedes-AMG GT3 Evo	33	(Germany) Florian Scholze	PA	3–4, 6–7
(Thailand) Singha Racing Team TP12	Porsche 911 GT3 R	39	(Thailand) Piti Bhirombhakdi	PA	3
(Thailand) Singha Racing Team TP12	Porsche 911 GT3 R	39	(New Zealand) Earl Bamber	PA	3
(United Kingdom) Greystone GT	McLaren 720S GT3	44	(United Kingdom) Andrew Gilbert	PA	5, 7
(United Kingdom) Greystone GT	McLaren 720S GT3	44	(Spain) Fran Rueda	PA	5, 7
(Italy) AF Corse	Ferrari 488 GT3 Evo 2020	55	(Belgium) Laurent de Meeus	Am	1–3, 5–7
(Italy) AF Corse	Ferrari 488 GT3 Evo 2020	55	(United Kingdom) Jamie Stanley	Am	1–3, 6
(Italy) AF Corse	Ferrari 488 GT3 Evo 2020	55	(United Kingdom) Johnny Mowlem	Am	5, 7
(Italy) AF Corse	Ferrari 488 GT3 Evo 2020	182	(Italy) Michele Rugolo	PA	5–7
(Italy) AF Corse	Ferrari 488 GT3 Evo 2020	182	(Netherlands) Willem van der Vorm	PA	5–7
(United Kingdom) 7TSIX	McLaren 720S GT3	76	(United Kingdom) Bradley Ellis	PA	6
(United Kingdom) 7TSIX	McLaren 720S GT3	76	(Cyprus) Leo Loukas	PA	6
(Austria) Baron Motorsport	Ferrari 488 GT3 Evo 2020	91	(Austria) Ernst Kirchmayr	Am	5
(Austria) Baron Motorsport	Ferrari 488 GT3 Evo 2020	91	(Austria) Philipp Baron	Am	5
(Germany) Herberth Motorsport	Porsche 911 GT3 R	92	(Germany) Ralf Bohn	PA	7
(Germany) Herberth Motorsport	Porsche 911 GT3 R	92	(Germany) Robert Renauer	PA	7
(Spain) Baporo Motorsport	Mercedes-AMG GT3	93	(Spain) Daniel Díaz-Varela	Am	1, 4, 7
(Spain) Baporo Motorsport	Mercedes-AMG GT3	93	(Spain) Jaume Font	Am	1
(Spain) Baporo Motorsport	Mercedes-AMG GT3	93	(Spain) Fran Rueda	Am	4
(Spain) Baporo Motorsport	Mercedes-AMG GT3	93	(Spain) Alex Villanueva	Am	7
(Italy) Nova Race Events	Honda NSX GT3 Evo22	99	(China) Lu Zhiwei	PA	6
(Italy) Nova Race Events	Honda NSX GT3 Evo22	99	(China) Yao Liangbo	PA	6
(Italy) Nova Race Events	Honda NSX GT3 Evo22	99	(Italy) Francesco Guerra	P	7
(Italy) Nova Race Events	Honda NSX GT3 Evo22	99	(Spain) Jorge Cabezas	P	7
(Italy) Imperiale Racing	Lamborghini Huracán GT3 Evo	525	(Republic of Ireland) James Roe	P	6
(Italy) Imperiale Racing	Lamborghini Huracán GT3 Evo	525	(Italy) Alberto Di Folco	P	6
(Germany) Motopark	Mercedes-AMG GT3 Evo	630	(Germany) Heiko Neumann	Am	5
(Germany) Motopark	Mercedes-AMG GT3 Evo	630	(Germany) Timo Rumpfkeil	Am	5

Icon	Class
P	Pro Cup
PA	Pro-Am Cup
Am	Am Cup

== Race calendar and results ==
- A seven-round provisional calendar was revealed on 16 November 2021.

Round		Circuit	Date	Pole position	Pro Winner	Pro-Am Winner	Am Winner
1	R1	(Portugal) Circuito do Estoril	30 April	(Switzerland) No. 133 Kessel Racing	(Italy) No. 63 Oregon Team	(Saudi Arabia) No. 18 Theeba Motorsport	(Switzerland) No. 77 Kessel Racing
1	R1	(Portugal) Circuito do Estoril	30 April	(Turkey) Murat Ruhi Cuhadaroglu (Italy) David Fumanelli	(Italy) Leonardo Pulcini (Chile) Benjamín Hites	(Saudi Arabia) Reema Juffali (United Kingdom) Adam Christodoulou	(United Kingdom) Charlie Hollings (United Kingdom) Omar Jackson
1	R2	(Portugal) Circuito do Estoril	1 May	(Poland) No. 777 Olimp Racing	(Italy) No. 63 Oregon Team	(Saudi Arabia) No. 18 Theeba Motorsport	(Germany) No. 25 Mercedes-AMG Team Mann Filter Team Landgraf
1	R2	(Portugal) Circuito do Estoril	1 May	(Poland) Marcin Jedlinski (Poland) Karol Basz	(Italy) Leonardo Pulcini (Chile) Benjamín Hites	(Saudi Arabia) Reema Juffali (United Kingdom) Adam Christodoulou	(Austria) Alexander Hrachowina (Austria) Martin Konrad
2	R1	(France) Circuit Paul Ricard	21 May	(Saudi Arabia) No. 18 Theeba Motorsport	(United Kingdom) No. 72 Optimum Motorsport	(Poland) No. 777 Olimp Racing	(Germany) No. 25 Mercedes-AMG Team Mann Filter Team Landgraf
2	R1	(France) Circuit Paul Ricard	21 May	(Saudi Arabia) Reema Juffali (United Kingdom) Adam Christodoulou	(United Kingdom) Nick Moss (United Kingdom) Joe Osborne	(Poland) Marcin Jedlinski (Poland) Karol Basz	(Austria) Alexander Hrachowina (Austria) Martin Konrad
2	R2	(France) Circuit Paul Ricard	22 May	(United Kingdom) No. 72 Optimum Motorsport	(United Kingdom) No. 72 Optimum Motorsport	(Saudi Arabia) No. 18 Theeba Motorsport	(Germany) No. 25 Mercedes-AMG Team Mann Filter Team Landgraf
2	R2	(France) Circuit Paul Ricard	22 May	(United Kingdom) Nick Moss (United Kingdom) Joe Osborne	(United Kingdom) Nick Moss (United Kingdom) Joe Osborne	(Saudi Arabia) Reema Juffali (United Kingdom) Adam Christodoulou	(Austria) Alexander Hrachowina (Austria) Martin Konrad
3	R1	(Belgium) Circuit de Spa-Francorchamps	19 June	(Italy) No. 63 Oregon Team	(Italy) No. 63 Oregon Team	(Poland) No. 777 Olimp Racing	(Germany) No. 786 GetSpeed Performance
3	R1	(Belgium) Circuit de Spa-Francorchamps	19 June	(Italy) Leonardo Pulcini (Chile) Benjamín Hites	(Italy) Leonardo Pulcini (Chile) Benjamín Hites	(Poland) Karol Basz (Poland) Marcin Jedlinski	(Thailand) Kiki Sak Nana (Germany) Adam Osieka
4	R1	(Hungary) Hungaroring	9 July	(Italy) No. 63 Oregon Team	(United Kingdom) No. 72 Optimum Motorsport	(Germany) No. 33 Team GT	(Germany) No. 25 Mann Filter Team Landgraf
4	R1	(Hungary) Hungaroring	9 July	(Italy) Leonardo Pulcini (Chile) Benjamín Hites	(United Kingdom) Nick Moss (United Kingdom) Joe Osborne	(Germany) Florian Scholze (Switzerland) Alain Valente	(Austria) Alexander Hrachowina (Austria) Martin Konrad
4	R2	(Hungary) Hungaroring	10 July	(Switzerland) No. 133 Kessel Racing	(Italy) No. 19 Oregon Team	(Slovakia) No. 16 Racing Trevor	(Germany) No. 786 GetSpeed Performance
4	R2	(Hungary) Hungaroring	10 July	(Turkey) Murat Ruhi Cuhadaroglu (Italy) David Fumanelli	(Switzerland) Kevin Gilardoni (Netherlands) Glenn van Berlo	(Czech Republic) Dennis Waszek (Finland) Jesse Krohn	(Thailand) Kiki Sak Nana (Germany) Adam Osieka
5	R1	(Austria) Red Bull Ring	10 September	(Switzerland) No. 133 Kessel Racing	(Italy) No. 19 Oregon Team	(Saudi Arabia) No. 18 Theeba Motorsport	(Austria) No. 91 Baron Motorsport
5	R1	(Austria) Red Bull Ring	10 September	(Turkey) Murat Ruhi Cuhadaroglu (Italy) David Fumanelli	(Switzerland) Kevin Gilardoni (Netherlands) Glenn van Berlo	(Saudi Arabia) Reema Juffali (United Kingdom) Adam Christodoulou	(Austria) Ernst Kirchmayr (Austria) Philipp Baron
5	R2	(Austria) Red Bull Ring	11 September	(Poland) No. 777 Olimp Racing	(Italy) No. 63 Oregon Team	(Germany) No. 3 Aust Motorsport	(Germany) No. 786 GetSpeed Performance
5	R2	(Austria) Red Bull Ring	11 September	(Poland) Karol Basz (Poland) Marcin Jedlinski	(Italy) Leonardo Pulcini (Chile) Benjamín Hites	(Austria) Max Hofer (Germany) Dino Steiner	(Thailand) Kiki Sak Nana (Germany) Adam Osieka
6	R1	(Italy) Autodromo Nazionale di Monza	24 September	(Germany) No. 54 SPS Automotive Performance	(Italy) No. 24 Dinamic Motorsport	(Germany) No. 33 Team GT	(Germany) No. 25 Mann Filter Team Landgraf
6	R1	(Italy) Autodromo Nazionale di Monza	24 September	(Switzerland) Dexter Müller (Switzerland) Yannick Mettler	(Austria) Klaus Bachler (Italy) Riccardo Cazzaniga	(Germany) Florian Scholze (Switzerland) Alain Valente	(Austria) Alexander Hrachowina (Austria) Martin Konrad
6	R2	(Italy) Autodromo Nazionale di Monza	25 September	(Switzerland) No. 133 Kessel Racing	(United Kingdom) No. 72 Optimum Motorsport	(Germany) No. 54 SPS Automotive Performance	(Germany) No. 786 GetSpeed Performance
6	R2	(Italy) Autodromo Nazionale di Monza	25 September	(Turkey) Murat Ruhi Cuhadaroglu (Italy) David Fumanelli	(United Kingdom) Nick Moss (United Kingdom) Joe Osborne	(Switzerland) Dexter Müller (Switzerland) Yannick Mettler	(Thailand) Kiki Sak Nana (Germany) Adam Osieka
7	R1	(Spain) Circuit de Barcelona-Catalunya	15 October	(Germany) No. 77 GetSpeed Performance	(Germany) No. 77 GetSpeed Performance	(Poland) No. 777 Olimp Racing	(Germany) No. 25 Mann Filter Team Landgraf
7	R1	(Spain) Circuit de Barcelona-Catalunya	15 October	(Oman) Al Faisal Al Zubair (Germany) Fabian Schiller	(Oman) Al Faisal Al Zubair (Germany) Fabian Schiller	(Poland) Karol Basz (Poland) Marcin Jedlinski	(Austria) Alexander Hrachowina (Austria) Martin Konrad
7	R2	(Spain) Circuit de Barcelona-Catalunya	16 October	(Italy) No. 24 Dinamic Motorsport	(Italy) No. 19 Oregon Team	(Germany) No. 92 Herberth Motorsport	(Germany) No. 25 Mann Filter Team Landgraf
7	R2	(Spain) Circuit de Barcelona-Catalunya	16 October	(Austria) Klaus Bachler (Italy) Riccardo Cazzaniga	(Switzerland) Kevin Gilardoni (Netherlands) Glenn van Berlo	(Germany) Ralf Bohn (Germany) Robert Renauer	(Austria) Alexander Hrachowina (Austria) Martin Konrad

== Championship standings ==
=== Points systems ===
Points are awarded to the top 10 (Pro) or top 6 (Am, Pro-Am, Teams) classified finishers. If less than 6 participants start the race or if less than 75% of the original race distance is completed, half points are awarded. For the Endurance Race (Spa) points are multiplied by 2. At the end of the season, the 2 lowest race scores are dropped; if the points dropped are those obtained in the Endurance race, that will count as 2 races; however, the dropped races cannot be the result of disqualification or race bans.

==== Overall ====
Position	1st	2nd	3rd	4th	5th	6th	7th	8th	9th	10th
Points	15	12	10	8	6	5	4	3	2	1

==== Pro-Am, Am, and Teams ====
Position	1st	2nd	3rd	4th	5th	6th
Points	10	8	6	4	3	2

=== Drivers' championships ===
==== Overall ====
Pos.	Driver	Team	EST (Portugal)		LEC (France)		SPA (Belgium)	HUN (Hungary)		RBR (Austria)		MNZ (Italy)		CAT (Spain)		Pts	Net Points
International GT Open
1	(Italy) Leonardo Pulcini (Chile) Benjamín Hites	(Italy) Oregon Team	1	1	8	6	1	8	13	2	1	8	2	2	5	131	128
2	(United Kingdom) Nick Moss (United Kingdom) Joe Osborne	(United Kingdom) Optimum Motorsport	2	2	1	1	Ret	2	2	4	4	17†	1	4	4	125	125
3	(Netherlands) Glenn Van Berlo (Switzerland) Kevin Gilardoni	(Italy) Oregon Team	3	4	4	2	3	4	1	1	8	7	Ret	7	1	122	119
4	(France) Sébastien Baud (Luxembourg) Steve Jans	(Germany) Mercedes-AMG Team GetSpeed Performance	Ret	6	6	4	Ret	15	10	5	2	6	3	12	2	64	64
5	(Poland) Marcin Jedlinski (Poland) Karol Basz	(Poland) Olimp Racing	6	5	2	8	4	Ret	5	15	Ret	11	18†	3	9	60	60
6	(Saudi Arabia) Reema Juffali (United Kingdom) Adam Christodoulou	(Saudi Arabia) Theeba Motorsport	4	3	7	3	Ret	Ret	DNS	3	20†			6	7	51	51
7	(Switzerland) Yannick Mettler (Switzerland) Dexter Müller	(Germany) SPS automotive performance	8	7	5	9	8	6	9	7	16	5	4	13	8	49	49
8	(Turkey) Murat Ruhi Cuhadaroglu (Italy) David Fumanelli	(Switzerland) Kessel Racing	10	Ret	3	18	5	11	8	6	6	4	8	21†	Ret	47	47
9	(Austria) Klaus Bachler (Italy) Riccardo Cazzaniga	(Italy) Dinamic Motorsport										1	5	1	3	46	46
10	(Switzerland) Alain Valente	(Germany) Mercedes-AMG Team GT	7	12	9	13	Ret	1	7	18	13	2	14	8	6	45	45
11	(Germany) Florian Scholze	(Germany) Mercedes-AMG Team GT					Ret	1	7			2	14	8	6	39	39
11	(Germany) Florian Scholze	(Italy) Antonelli Motorsport								13	15					39	39
12	(Germany) Moritz Kranz (United Kingdom) Janine Shoffner	(Germany) Mercedes-AMG Team GetSpeed Performance	9	8	16	7	9	5	4	8	5	9	WD			38	38
13	(Zimbabwe) Axcil Jefferies (Poland) Roman Ziemian	(Switzerland) Kessel Racing	5	10	13	5		9	12	17	9	3	12			27	27
14	(Australia) Jordan Love (United Kingdom) Frank Bird	(Germany) Haupt Racing Team					2									24	24
15	(Austria) Max Hofer (Germany) Dino Steiner	(Germany) Aust Motorsport			Ret	Ret	6			9	3			9	11	24	24
16	(Finland) Jesse Krohn (Czech Republic) Dennis Waszek	(Slovakia) Racing Team Trevor						3	3							20	20
17	(Thailand) Kiki Sak Nana	(Germany) Mercedes-AMG Team GetSpeed Performance	Ret	11	14	14	7	14	15	16	10	Ret	6	17	15	14	14
17	(Germany) Adam Osieka	(Germany) Mercedes-AMG Team GetSpeed Performance	Ret	11	14	14	7	14	15	16	10	Ret	6			14	14
18	(Italy) Michele Rugolo (Netherlands) Willem van der Vorm	(Italy) AF Corse								22	7			5	16	10	10
19	(Spain) Fran Rueda	(Spain) Baporo Motorsport						7	6							10	10
19	(Spain) Fran Rueda	(United Kingdom) Greystone GT								19	11			20	10	10	10
20	(Spain) Daniel Díaz-Varela	(Spain) Baporo Motorsport	DNS	DNS				7	6					19	19	9	9
21	(Germany) Bernhard Laber	(Germany) Mercedes-AMG Team GT	7	12	9	13				18	13					6	6
22	(Austria) Alexander Hrachowina (Austria) Martin Konrad	(Germany) Mercedes-AMG Team Mann Filter Team Landgraf	Ret	9	10	10	11	12	14	11	12	12	10	10	13	6	6
23	(Republic of Ireland) James Roe (Italy) Alberto Di Folco	(Italy) Imperiale Racing										18†	7			4	4
24	(Belgium) Laurent de Meeus	(Italy) AF Corse	12	13	12	12	10			20	14	10	13	16	12	3	3
24	(United Kingdom) Jamie Stanley	(Italy) AF Corse	12	13	12	12	10					10	13			3	3
25	(Italy) Giuseppe Cipriani	(Italy) Barone Rampante	Ret	DNS	Ret	Ret		16	20†			Ret	9	15	14	2	2
26	(United Kingdom) Andrew Gilbert	(United Kingdom) Greystone GT								19	11			20	10	1	1
27	(Austria) Ernst Kirchmayr (Austria) Philipp Baron	(Austria) Baron Motorsport								10	18					1	1
28	(Austria) Dominik Baumann (Germany) Valentin Pierburg	(Germany) SPS automotive performance						10	11							1	1
29	(Italy) Alex Frassineti	(Italy) Barone Rampante	Ret	DNS	Ret	Ret										0	0
30	(Germany) Mario Hirsch (Austria) Dominik Schraml	(Germany) Twin Busch by Équipe Vitesse								12	21†					0	0
31	(Italy) Marco Antonelli	(Italy) Antonelli Motorsport								13	15					0	0
32	(Hungary) János Sánta	(Hungary) GFS Motorsport						18	19							0	0
33	(Thailand) Piti Bhirombhakdi (New Zealand) Earl Bamber	(Thailand) Singha Racing Team TP12					15†									0	0
34	(United Kingdom) Johnny Mowlem	(Italy) AF Corse								20	14			16	12	0	0
35	(United Kingdom) Bradley Ellis (Cyprus) Leo Loukas	(United Kingdom) 7TSIX										15	16			0	0
36	(United Kingdom) Charlie Hollings (United Kingdom) Omar Jackson	(Switzerland) Kessel Racing	11	Ret	11	11	13									0	0
37	(Spain) Jaume Font	(Spain) Baporo Motorsport	DNS	DNS												0	0
38	(China) Lu Zhiwei (China) Yao Liangbo	(Italy) Nova Race Events										Ret	17			0	0
39	(Germany) Heiko Neumann (Germany) Timo Rumpfkeil	(Germany) Motopark								14	19†					0	0
41	(Switzerland) Pascal Bachmann	(Belgium) Street Art Racing			18	15		19	16			14	Ret	14	18	0	0
41	(France) Julien Darras	(Belgium) Street Art Racing						19	16							0	0
42	(Poland) Stanislaw Jedlinski (Poland) Krystian Korzeniowski	(Poland) Olimp Racing	Ret	14	15	17	14†	13	17	23	Ret	16	15	11	20	0	0
43	(United States) Stephen Earle (Italy) Erwin Zanotti	(Switzerland) Kessel Racing	Ret	DNS	17	16	12	17	18	21	17	13	11	18	17	0	0
Pos.	Driver	Team	EST (Portugal)		LEC (France)		SPA (Belgium)	HUN (Hungary)		RBR (Austria)		MNZ (Italy)		CAT (Spain)		Pts	Net Points
