= Reema Juffali =

Saudi racing driver (born 1992)

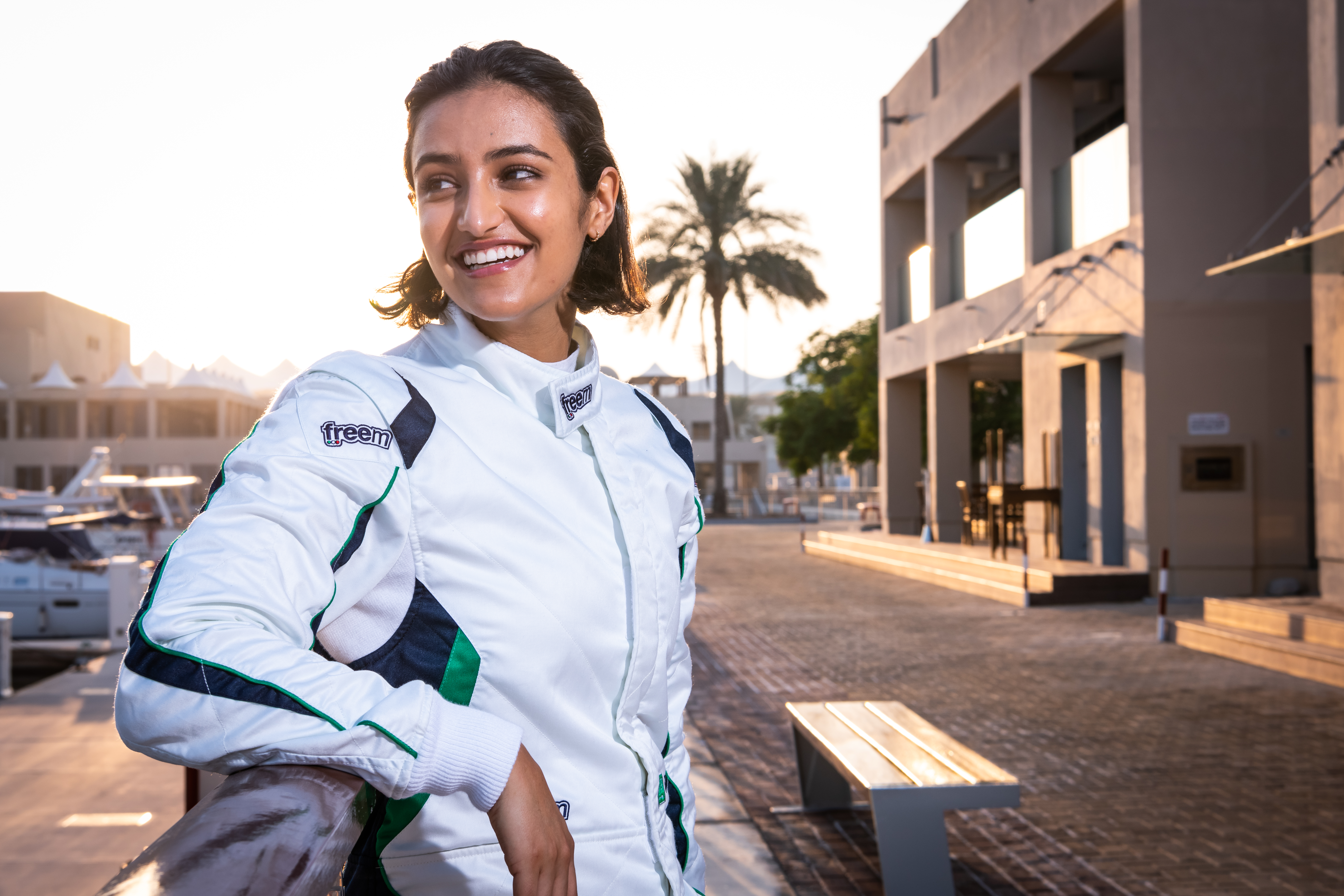
- Juffali at Yas Marina, 2018
- Nationality: (Saudi Arabia) Saudi
- Born: 18 January 1992 (age 34) Jeddah, Saudi Arabia

International GT Open PRO-AM career
- Current team: Theeba Motorsport
- Categorisation: FIA Silver (until 2022); FIA Bronze (2023–)
- Car number: 18
- Starts: 10 (11 entries)
- Wins: 4
- Podiums: 6
- Poles: 1
- Best finish: 2nd in 2022

Previous series
- 2021 2020 2020 2019–20: GB3 Championship; F4 British Championship; Formula 4 UAE Championship; Jaguar I-Pace eTrophy

Reema Juffali (also Reema Al-Juffali; Arabic: ريما الجفالي; born 18 January 1992) is a Saudi Arabian amateur race car driver who competes in the International GT Open with her own team, Theeba Motorsport. She is the first-ever Saudi Arabian woman racing driver, the first Saudi woman to hold a racing license and also the first Saudi woman to win an international motor race. In November 2019, she became the country's first woman racing car driver to take part in an international racing competition in the Kingdom of Saudi Arabia.

In 2022, Juffali was named as one of the BBC's 100 Women – a list of 100 inspiring and influential women from across the world.

== Early life and education ==
Juffali was born and raised in Jeddah. As a child, she took an interest in cars and sports. Her interest was deemed to be ironic as the country strictly banned women to engage in driving at that time. She completed her primary education at the British International School of Jeddah. Juffali pursued her higher studies in international affairs at the Northeastern University in 2010.

== Racing career ==
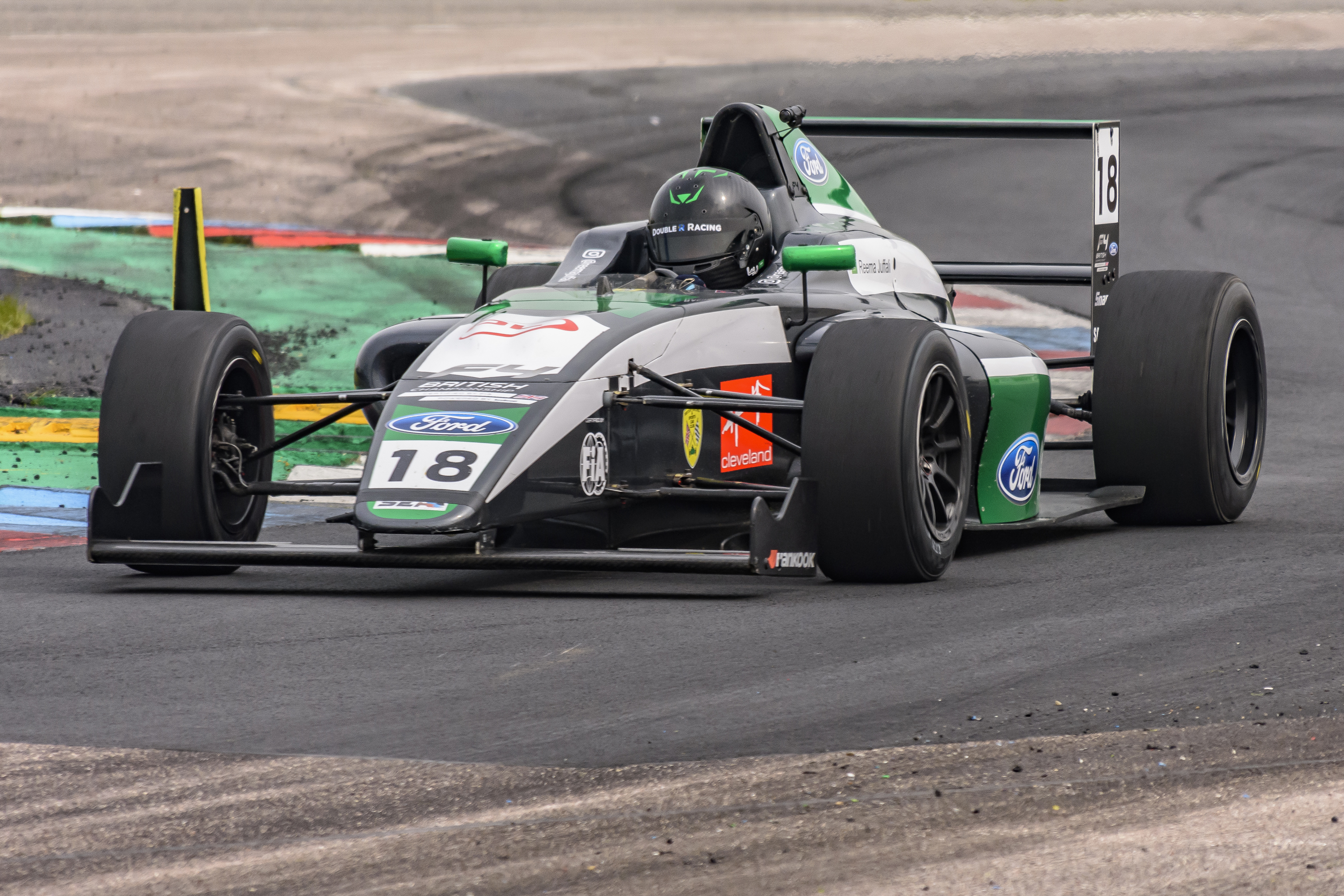
Juffali in her F4 car at Thruxton in April 2019

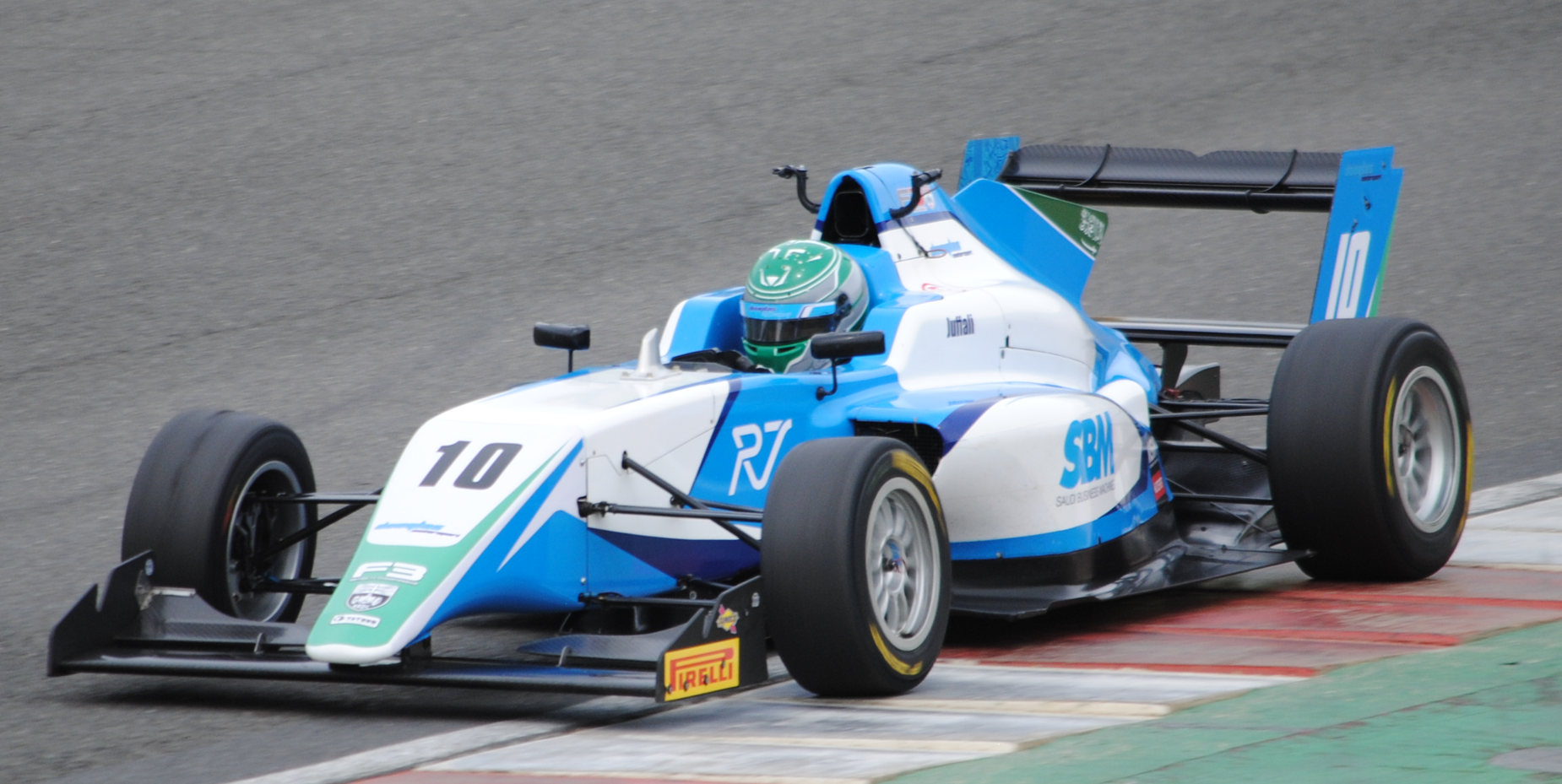
Juffali competing in the GB3 Championship at Brands Hatch in May 2021.

After graduation, Juffali obtained a driving license in October 2010 as she passed her driving test in the US. She obtained her racing license in September 2017, after the women to drive movement successfully ended the ban on women drivers in Saudi Arabia that same month. Her debut race as a professional racer came in October 2018 and she registered her major career victory in December 2018.

In April 2019, Juffali represented Saudi Arabia in 2019 F4 British Championship at Brands Hatch that was her first appearance in a competitive racing event at the F4 British Championship.

On 22 November 2019, Juffali became the first Saudi Arabian woman to compete in an international racing competition in Saudi Arabia, taking part in the first round of the 2019-20 Jaguar I-Pace eTrophy as a guest driver. The race was held at the Riyadh Street Circuit. She competed in the 2020 Formula 4 UAE Championship, and the 2021 GB3 Championship.

In 2022, Juffali founded her own team, Theeba Motorsport, to improve Saudi Arabian access and participation in motorsport by creating a series of educational internship and apprenticeship programmes. The team competes in the Pro-Am class of the International GT Open and intends to become the first Saudi racing team to compete at the 24 Hours of Le Mans.

== Awards and recognition ==
In 2022, Juffali was named as one of the BBC's 100 Women – a list of 100 inspiring and influential women around the world – alongside singer-songwriter Billie Eilish, First Lady of Ukraine Olena Zelenska and Indian actress Priyanka Chopra.

== Racing record ==
=== Career summary ===
| Season | Series | Team | Races | Wins | Poles | F/Laps | Podiums | Points | Position |
|---|---|---|---|---|---|---|---|---|---|
| 2018–19 | MRF Challenge Formula 2000 Championship | MRF Racing | 5 | 0 | 0 | 0 | 0 | 2 | 16th |
| 2019 | F4 British Championship | Double R Racing | 30 | 0 | 0 | 0 | 0 | 20 | 13th |
| 2019 | Formula 4 UAE Championship - Trophy Round | Dragon Racing | 2 | 0 | 0 | 0 | 0 | N/A | NC |
| 2019–20 | Jaguar I-Pace eTrophy | Jaguar VIP Car | 2 | 0 | 0 | 0 | 0 | 0 | NC |
| 2020 | Formula 4 UAE Championship | Dragon Racing | 19 | 0 | 0 | 0 | 0 | 80 | 8th |
| 2020 | F4 British Championship | Argenti Motorsport | 26 | 0 | 0 | 0 | 0 | 27 | 13th |
| 2021 | GB3 Championship | Douglas Motorsport | 21 | 0 | 0 | 0 | 0 | 90 | 18th |
| 2022 | 24H GT Series - GT3 Am | SPS Automotive Performance | 1 | 0 | 0 | 0 | 1 | 25 | ? |
| 2022 | GT World Challenge Europe Endurance Cup | SPS Automotive Performance | 1 | 0 | 0 | 0 | 0 | 0 | NC |
| 2022 | International GT Open | Theeba Motorsport | 10 | 0 | 1 | 0 | 3 | 51 | 6th |
| 2022 | International GT Open Pro-Am | Theeba Motorsport | 10 | 4 | 1 | 0 | 6 | 57 | **2nd** |
| 2023 | GT World Challenge Europe Endurance Cup | Theeba Motorsport | 5 | 0 | 0 | 0 | 0 | 0 | NC |
| 2023 | GT World Challenge Europe Sprint Cup | Theeba Motorsport | 6 | 0 | 0 | 0 | 0 | 0 | NC |
| 2024 | F1 Academy | Prema Racing | 2 | 0 | 0 | 0 | 0 | 0 | 21st |
| 2024 | GT4 European Series - Am | Saudi Racing with Comtoyou | | | | | | | |
| 2024–25 | Asian Le Mans Series - GT | Blackthorn | 2 | 0 | 0 | 0 | 0 | 0 | 29th |
| 2025 | Middle East Trophy - GT3 | Haupt Racing Team | 2 | 0 | 0 | 0 | 0 | 10 | 11th |
| 2025 | GT4 European Series - Am | Elite Motorsport with Entire Race Engineering | | | | | | | |
| 2026 | 992 Endurance Cup | EST1 Racing | | | | | | | |

* Season still in progress.

=== Complete MRF Challenge Formula 2000 Championship results ===
(key) (Races in bold indicate pole position) (Races in italics indicate fastest lap)

| Year | 1 | 2 | 3 | 4 | 5 | 6 | 7 | 8 | 9 | 10 | 11 | 12 | 13 | 14 | 15 | DC | Points |
|---|---|---|---|---|---|---|---|---|---|---|---|---|---|---|---|---|---|
| 2018-19 | DUB; 1 | DUB; 2 | DUB; 3 | DUB; 4 | DUB; 5 | BHR; 1 | BHR; 2 | BHR; 3 | BHR; 4 | BHR; 5 | CHE; 1; 13 | CHE; 2; 13 | CHE; 3; 12 | CHE; 4; 9 | CHE; 5; 13 | 16th | 2 |

=== Complete F4 British Championship results ===
(key) (Races in bold indicate pole position) (Races in italics indicate fastest lap)

| Year | Team | 1 | 2 | 3 | 4 | 5 | 6 | 7 | 8 | 9 | 10 | 11 | 12 | 13 | 14 | 15 | 16 | 17 | 18 | 19 | 20 | 21 | 22 | 23 | 24 | 25 | 26 | 27 | 28 | 29 | 30 | DC | Points |
|---|---|---|---|---|---|---|---|---|---|---|---|---|---|---|---|---|---|---|---|---|---|---|---|---|---|---|---|---|---|---|---|---|---|
| 2019 | Double R Racing | BHI; 1; 12 | BHI; 2; 9 | BHI; 3; 11 | DON; 1; 12 | DON; 2; 10 | DON; 3; 11 | THR1; 1 Ret | THR1; 2; 13 | THR1; 3; 11 | CRO; 1; 13 | CRO; 2; 13 | CRO; 3 Ret | OUL; 1; 11 | OUL; 2; 12 | OUL; 3; 10 | SNE; 1; 12 | SNE; 2; 9 | SNE; 3; 12 | THR2; 1; 9 | THR2; 2; 8 | THR2; 3; 12 | KNO; 1 Ret | KNO; 2 Ret | KNO; 3; 8 | SIL; 1; 12 | SIL; 2; 14 | SIL; 3; 9 | BHGP; 1; 10 | BHGP; 2; 11 | BHGP; 3; 10 | 13th | 20 |
| 2020 | Argenti Motorsport | DON; 1; 14 | DON; 2; 10 | DON; 3; 13 | BHGP; 1; 12 | BHGP; 2; 12 | BHGP; 3; 12 | OUL; 1; 13 | OUL; 2; 10 | OUL; 3; 12 | KNO; 1; 12 | KNO; 2; 11 | KNO; 3; 12 | THR; 1; 9 | THR; 2 Ret | THR; 3; 10 | SIL; 1; 8 | SIL; 2; 10 | SIL; 3; 8 | CRO; 1; 11 | CRO; 2; 8 | SNE; 1; 10 | SNE; 2; 9 | SNE; 3; 8 | BHI; 1; 12 | BHI; 2; 9 | BHI; 3; 12 | | | | | 13th | 27 |

=== Complete Formula 4 UAE Championship results ===
(key) (Races in bold indicate pole position; races in italics indicate fastest lap)

| Year | Team | 1 | 2 | 3 | 4 | 5 | 6 | 7 | 8 | 9 | 10 | 11 | 12 | 13 | 14 | 15 | 16 | 17 | 18 | 19 | 20 | DC | Points |
|---|---|---|---|---|---|---|---|---|---|---|---|---|---|---|---|---|---|---|---|---|---|---|---|
| 2020 | Dragon Racing | DUB1; 1; 9 | DUB1; 2 Ret | DUB1; 3; 5 | DUB1; 4 C | YMC1; 1; 8 | YMC1; 2; 6 | YMC1; 3; 9 | YMC1; 4; 6 | YMC2; 1; 8 | YMC2; 2; 8 | YMC2; 3; 8 | YMC2; 4 Ret | DUB2; 1; 8 | DUB2; 2; 5 | DUB2; 3; 7 | DUB2; 4 Ret | DUB3; 1; 9 | DUB3; 2; 9 | DUB3; 3; 8 | DUB3; 4; 7 | 8th | 80 |

=== Complete GB3 Championship results ===
(key) (Races in bold indicate pole position) (Races in italics indicate fastest lap)

| Year | Entrant | 1 | 2 | 3 | 4 | 5 | 6 | 7 | 8 | 9 | 10 | 11 | 12 | 13 | 14 | 15 | 16 | 17 | 18 | 19 | 20 | 21 | 22 | 23 | 24 | DC | Points |
|---|---|---|---|---|---|---|---|---|---|---|---|---|---|---|---|---|---|---|---|---|---|---|---|---|---|---|---|
| 2021 | Douglas Motorsport | BRH; 1; 15 | BRH; 2; 16 | BRH; 3 Ret | SIL1; 1; 13 | SIL1; 2; 16 | SIL1; 3; 4 | DON1; 1; 16 | DON1; 2 Ret | DON1; 3 Ret | SPA; 1; 15 | SPA; 2; 12 | SPA; 3 Ret | SNE; 1; 13 | SNE; 2; 17 | SNE; 3; 17 | SIL2; 1 WD | SIL2; 2 WD | SIL2; 3 WD | OUL; 1; 15 | OUL; 2; 10 | OUL; 3 Ret | DON2; 1 Ret | DON2; 2; 18 | DON2; 3; 15 | 18th | 90 |

=== Complete International GT Open results ===
(Races in bold indicate pole position) (Races in italics indicate fastest lap)

| Year | Team | Car | Class | 1 | 2 | 3 | 4 | 5 | 6 | 7 | 8 | 9 | 10 | 11 | 12 | 13 | Pos. | Points |
|---|---|---|---|---|---|---|---|---|---|---|---|---|---|---|---|---|---|---|
| 2022 | Theeba Motorsport | Mercedes-AMG GT3 Evo | Pro-Am | EST; 1; 4 | EST; 2; 3 | **LEC**; **1**; 7 | LEC; 2; 3 | SPA; Ret | HUN; 1 Ret | HUN; 2 DNS | RBR; 1; 3 | RBR; 2; 20† | MNZ; 1 | MNZ; 2 | CAT; 1; 6 | CAT; 2; 7 | 6th | 51 |

=== Complete GT World Challenge Europe Endurance Cup results ===
(Races in bold indicate pole position) (Races in italics indicate fastest lap)

| Year | Team | Car | Class | 1 | 2 | 3 | 4 | 5 | 6 | 7 | Pos. | Points |
|---|---|---|---|---|---|---|---|---|---|---|---|---|
| 2023 | Theeba Motorsport | Mercedes-AMG GT3 Evo | Bronze | MNZ; 38 | LEC; 43† | SPA; 6H; 52 | SPA; 12H; 60† | SPA; 24H; Ret | NÜR; 29 | CAT; 36 | 30th | 6 |

=== Complete F1 Academy results ===
(key) (Races in bold indicate pole position; races in italics indicate fastest lap)

| Year | Entrant | 1 | 2 | 3 | 4 | 5 | 6 | 7 | 8 | 9 | 10 | 11 | 12 | 13 | 14 | 15 | DC | Points |
|---|---|---|---|---|---|---|---|---|---|---|---|---|---|---|---|---|---|---|
| 2024 | Prema Racing | JED; 1; 11 | JED; 2 Ret | MIA; 1 | MIA; 2 | CAT; 1 | CAT; 2 | ZAN; 1 | ZAN; 2 | SIN; 1 | SIN; 2 | LSL; 1 | LSL; 2 | YMC; 1 | YMC; 2 | YMC; 3 | 21st | 0 |

== See also ==
- List of female racing drivers
