= Martin Konrad =

Austrian racing driver (born 1978)

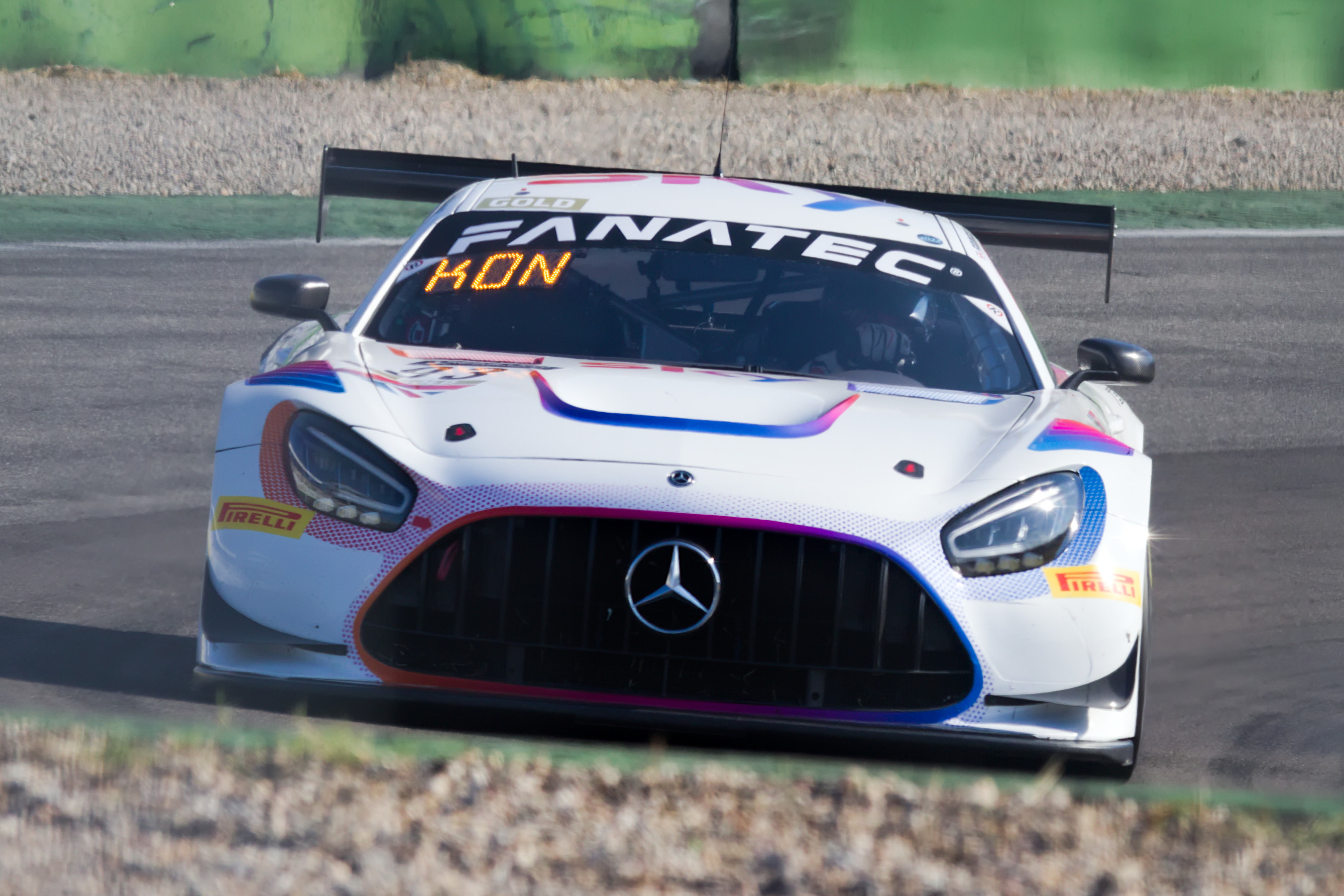
- Konrad in 2022
- Nationality: (Austria) Austrian
- Born: 7 October 1978 (age 48) Vöcklabruck, Austria
- Categorisation: FIA Bronze

Championship titles
- 2022 2021, 2022: International GT Open – Am; Intercontinental GT Challenge – Pro-Am

Martin Konrad (born 7 October 1978) is an Austrian racing driver who last competed in the GT World Challenge Europe Endurance Cup for Triple Eight JMR. Tightly linked to Mercedes-AMG, he won the Bathurst 12 Hour overall in 2022 for SunEnergy1 Racing.

== Career ==
Konrad made his single-seater debut in 2006, competing in the German Formula Three Championship for Franz Wöss Racing. Nine years later, Konrad returned to professional racing, competing on a part-time basis in the 2015 24H Series for MSG Motorsport, most notably winning the 12 Hours of Zandvoort in the 997 class. The following year, Konrad made his GT3 debut at the 12 Hours of Mugello for Audi-fielding Spirit Race, and also competed in the majority of the DMV GTC60 season, finishing runner-up in Class 8 driving a Porsche 991 GT3 R.

In 2017, Konrad joined MS Racing to compete in International GT Open with MS Racing, sharing the team's Mercedes-AMG GT3 with Alexander Hrachowina. Racing in the Am class, Konrad won at Estoril and the Hungaroring and took six other podiums to secure third in the class standings. In parallel, Konrad also drove a Lamborghini Huracan GT3 for Spirit Racing in the DMV GTC series, finishing eighth in the Class 1 standings with one win to his name.

Remaining in GT Open for 2018 with MS Racing, now in a partnership with HTP Motorsport, Konrad and Hrachowina won at Le Castellet and the Hungaroring, as well as taking five more podiums to end the season fourth among the Am entries. During 2018, Konrad also raced at the 24 Hours of Spa for SunEnergy1 Team HTP Motorsport, finishing third in the Pro-Am class on his debut. In 2019, Konrad and Hrachowina continued with HTP Motorsport for a third season in International GT Open, scoring six wins en route to runner-up honours in the Am standings. During 2019, Konrad won the Dubai 24 Hour in A6-Am for the same team, and finished second in GT3 Pro-Am at the Gulf 12 Hours for Spirit Race Team Uwe Alzen Automotive.

The following year, Konrad raced for Mercedes-AMG customer team Ram Racing for the majority of the GT World Challenge Europe Endurance Cup, as well as part-time in the Intercontinental GT Challenge for SunEnergy1 Racing, most notably taking a Pro-Am podium at the Indianapolis 8 Hours. In 2021, Konrad switched to AMG-fielding SPS Automotive Performance for another part-time campaign in the GT World Challenge Europe Endurance Cup, in which he took a Pro-Am win at Barcelona. During 2021, Konrad also competed in the final two rounds of the Intercontinental GT Challenge for SunEnergy1 Racing, clinching the Pro-Am title alongside Kenny Habul and Mikaël Grenier.

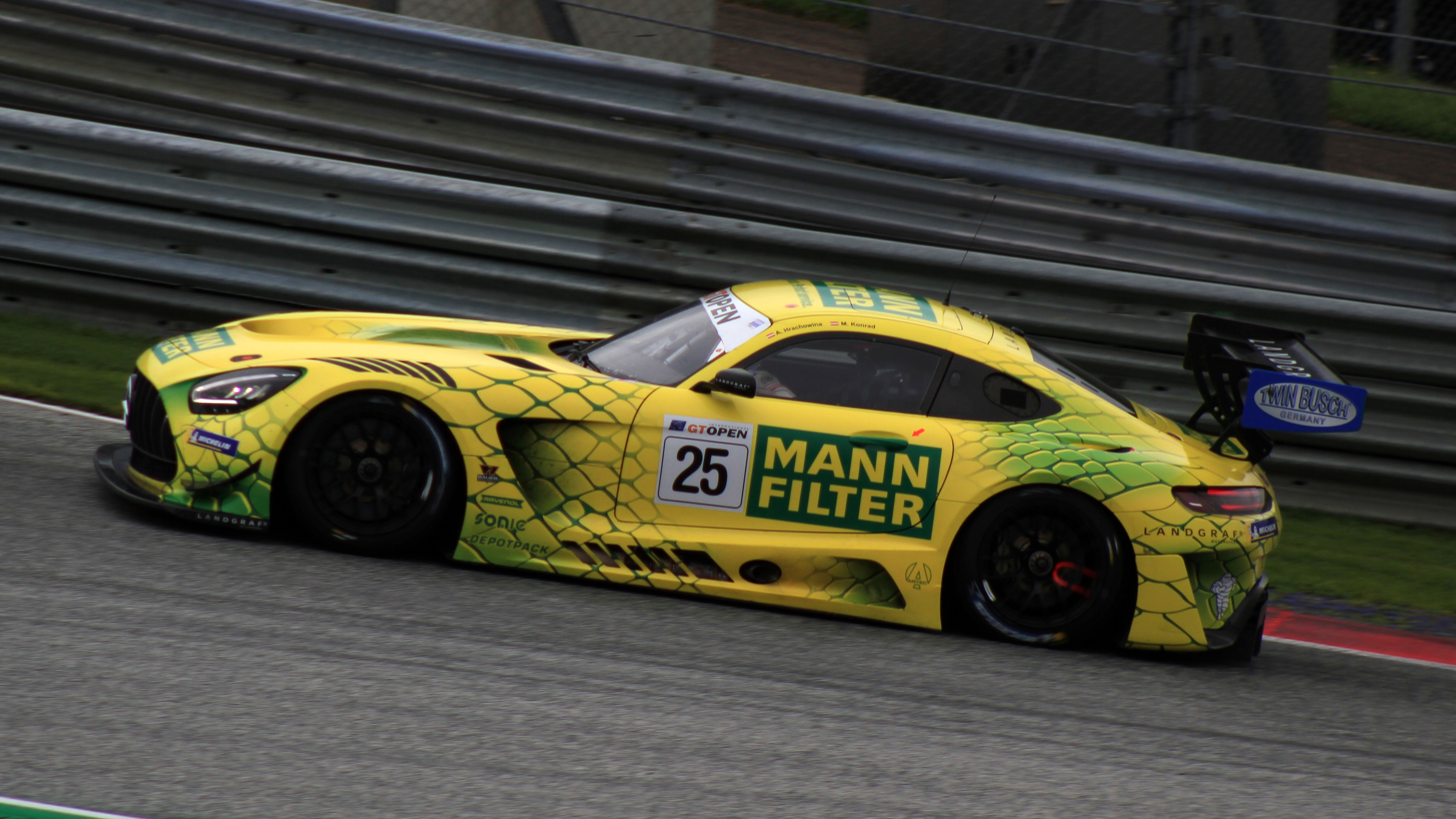
Konrad's Mann-Filter Team Landgraf Mercedes-AMG at the Red Bull Ring in 2022.

In 2022, Konrad returned to Mann-Filter Team Landgraf to race in International GT Open alongside Hrachowina, as the pair won eight times en route to the Am class title. In parallel, Konrad also contested the full Intercontinental GT Challenge season with SunEnergy1 Racing–backed teams, achieving the biggest success of his career by winning the Bathurst 12 Hour overall alongside Habul, Jules Gounon and Luca Stolz, and securing his second consecutive Pro-Am title. During 2022, Konrad also raced part-time in GT World Challenge Europe Endurance Cup for three different teams, most notably winning at Le Castellet in Pro-Am for SPS Automotive Performance.

Continuing with Mercedes machinery for 2023, Konrad joined Haupt Racing Team to race in the GT class of the Asian Le Mans Series alongside Al Faisal Al Zubair and Stolz. In his first season in the series, Konrad won both races at Abu Dhabi to take runner-up honours in class. Later that year, Konrad raced at the 24 Hours of Spa for SunEnergy1 Racing, which he won in Pro-Am. Following that, Konrad raced in the 2023–24 Asian Le Mans Series for both GetSpeed-run cars, before competing at the 2024 24 Hours of Spa for Triple Eight JMR.

== Racing record ==
=== Racing career summary ===
Season	Series	Team	Races	Wins	Poles	F/Laps	Podiums	Points	Position
2006	German Formula Three Championship – Trophy	Franz Wöss Racing	17	0	0	0	0	28	7th
2015	24H Series – 997	MSG Motorsport	2	1	0	0	1	0	NC
2016	24H Series – 997	MSG Motorsport	1	0	0	0	0	10	13th
2016	24H Series – A6-Pro	Spirit Race	1	0	0	0	0	0	NC
2016	DMV GTC60 – Class 8		6	4	0	0	5	99.25	**2nd**
2017	24H Series – A6-Pro	MS Racing	1	0	0	0	0	0	NC
2017	International GT Open – Am	MS Racing	11	2	2	3	8	34	**3rd**
2017	DMV GTC60 – Class 1	Spirit Racing	8	1	0	0	3	70	8th
2018	International GT Open – Am	HTP Motorsport / MS Racing	10	2	2	5	7	53	4th
2018	Blancpain GT Series Endurance Cup – Pro-Am	SunEnergy1 Team HTP Motorsport	1	0	0	0	1	28	15th
2018	Intercontinental GT Challenge	SunEnergy1 Team HTP Motorsport	1	0	0	0	0	0	NC†
2018	Gulf 12 Hours – GT3 Pro-Am	Attempto Racing	1	0	0	0	0	—N/a	4th
2019	24H GT Series Continents – A6 Am	Mann-Filter Team HTP Motorsport	1	1	0	0	1	29	NC
2019	International GT Open – Am	HTP Motorsport	10	6	6	7	8	41	**2nd**
2019	24H GT Series Continents – A6	Toksport WRT	1	0	0	0	0	0	NC
2019	Gulf 12 Hours – GT3 Pro-Am	Spirit Race Team Uwe Alzen Automotive	1	0	0	0	1	—N/a	**2nd**
2020	24H GT Series Continents – GT3 Pro	Toksport WRT	1	0	0	0	0	12	NC
2020	Intercontinental GT Challenge	SunEnergy1 Racing	2	0	0	0	0	2	20th
2020	GT World Challenge Europe Endurance Cup – Pro-Am	Ram Racing	3	0	0	0	0	27	15th
2020	GT4 European Series – Pro-Am	Selleslagh Racing Team	1	0	0	0	0	10	9th
2021	GT World Challenge Europe Endurance Cup – Pro-Am	SPS Automotive Performance	3	1	0	0	1	45	10th
2021	Intercontinental GT Challenge	SunEnergy1 Racing	2	0	0	0	0	10	24th
2022	24H GT Series Continents – GT3	Al Manar Racing by HRT	1	0	0	0	0	45	NC
2022	24H GT Series Continents – GT3	Mann-Filter Team Landgraf	1	0	0	0	1	45	NC
2022	International GT Open – Am	Mann-Filter Team Landgraf	13	8	?	?	12	108	**1st**
2022	Intercontinental GT Challenge	SunEnergy1 Racing by Triple Eight	1	1	0	0	1	35	7th
2022	Intercontinental GT Challenge	SunEnergy1 Racing by SPS	2	0	0	0	0	35	7th
2022	Intercontinental GT Challenge	SunEnergy1 Racing by AKKodis ASP	1	0	0	0	0	35	7th
2022	GT World Challenge Europe Endurance Cup – Pro-Am	SPS Automotive Performance	1	1	0	0	1	61	5th
2022	GT World Challenge Europe Endurance Cup – Pro-Am	SunEnergy1 Racing by SPS	1	0	0	0	1	61	5th
2022	GT World Challenge Europe Endurance Cup – Gold	Sky - Tempesta Racing by HRT	1	0	0	0	0	1	29th
2022–23	Middle East Trophy – GT3	Al Manar Racing by HRT	1	0	0	0	0	0	NC
2023	Asian Le Mans Series – GT	Haupt Racing Team	4	2	0	0	3	71	**2nd**
2023	GT World Challenge Europe Endurance Cup – Pro-Am	SunEnergy1 Racing	1	1	0	0	1	37	10th
2023–24	Asian Le Mans Series – GT	AlManar Racing by GetSpeed	2	0	0	0	0	25	12th
2023–24	Asian Le Mans Series – GT	GetSpeed Performance	3	0	1	0	0	25	12th
2023–24	Middle East Trophy – GT3	GetSpeed Performance	1	0	0	0	0	2	NC
2024	GT World Challenge Europe Endurance Cup – Pro-Am	Triple Eight JMR	1	0	0	0	0	0	NC

^{†} As Konrad was a guest driver, he was ineligible for points.

=== Complete German Formula Three Championship results ===
(key) (Races in bold indicate pole position, races in italics indicate fastest lap)

Year	Team	1	2	3	4	5	6	7	8	9	10	11	12	13	14	15	16	17	18	19	20	DC	Points
2006	Franz Wöss Racing	OSC1; 1; 19	OSC1; 2 DNS	HOC; 1; 25	HOC; 2; 24	LAU1; 1; 20	LAU1; 2; 21	NÜR1; 1; 20	NÜR1; 2; 25	NÜR2; 1 Ret	NÜR2; 2; 20	ASS1; 1; 15	ASS1; 2; 19	LAU2; 1; 7	LAU2; 2; 14	ASS2; 1	ASS2; 2	SAL; 1; 20	SAL; 2; 19	OSC2; 1; 20	OSC2; 2; 21	24th	2

=== Complete International GT Open results ===
Year	Team	Car	Class	1	2	3	4	5	6	7	8	9	10	11	12	13	14	Pos.	Points
2017	MS Racing	Mercedes-AMG GT3	Am	EST; 1; 2	EST; 2; 1	SPA; 1 Ret	SPA; 2 DNS	LEC; 1; 2	LEC; 2; 2	HUN; 1; 1	HUN; 2; 2	SIL; 1; 2	SIL; 2 Ret	MNZ; 1; 2	MNZ; 2 Ret	CAT; 1	CAT; 2	3rd	34
2018	HTP Motorsport / MS Racing	Mercedes-AMG GT3	Am	EST; 1; 2	EST; 2; 5	LEC; 1; 1	LEC; 2; 2	SPA; 1 DNS	SPA; 2 DNS	HUN; 1; 1	HUN; 2; 3	SIL; 1; 3	SIL; 2 Ret	MNZ; 1; 3	MNZ; 2; 6	CAT; 1	CAT; 2	4th	53
2019	HTP Motorsport	Mercedes-AMG GT3	Am	LEC; 1; 1	LEC; 2; 1	HOC; 1; 1	HOC; 2; 1	SPA; 1 Ret	SPA; 2; 2	RBR; 1; 1	RBR; 2; 1	SIL; 1	SIL; 2	CAT; 1	CAT; 2	MNZ; 1; 3	MNZ; 2 Ret	2nd	41
2022	Mann-Filter Team Landgraf	Mercedes-AMG GT3 Evo	Am	EST; 1 Ret	EST; 2; 1	LEC; 1; 1	LEC; 2; 1	SPA; 3	HUN; 1; 1	HUN; 2; 1	RBR; 1; 2	RBR; 2; 2	MNZ; 1; 1	MNZ; 2; 3	CAT; 1; 1	CAT; 2; 1		1st	108

=== Complete GT World Challenge Europe results ===
==== GT World Challenge Europe Endurance Cup ====
Year	Team	Car	Class	1	2	3	4	5	6	7	Pos.	Points
2018	SunEnergy1 Team HTP Motorsport	Mercedes-AMG GT3	Pro-Am	MNZ	SIL	LEC	SPA; 6H; 23	SPA; 12H; 25	SPA; 24H; 20	CAT	15th	28
2020	Ram Racing	Mercedes-AMG GT3 Evo	Pro-Am	IMO	NÜR; 22	SPA; 6H; 48	SPA; 12H; 52	SPA; 24H; Ret	LEC; 28		15th	27
2021	SPS Automotive Performance	Mercedes-AMG GT3 Evo	Pro-Am	MNZ	LEC; 28	SPA; 6H	SPA; 12H	SPA; 24H	NÜR; 27	CAT; 25	10th	45
2022	SPS Automotive Performance	Mercedes-AMG GT3 Evo	Pro-Am	IMO	LEC; 24						5th	61
2022	SunEnergy1 Racing by SPS	Mercedes-AMG GT3 Evo	Pro-Am			SPA; 6H; 46	SPA; 12H; 39	SPA; 24H; 28			5th	61
2022	Sky - Tempesta Racing by HRT	Mercedes-AMG GT3 Evo	Gold						HOC; 32	CAT	29th	1
2023	SunEnergy1 Racing	Mercedes-AMG GT3 Evo	Pro-Am	MNZ	LEC	SPA; 6H; 53	SPA; 12H; 39	SPA; 24H; 22	NÜR	CAT	10th	37
2024	Triple Eight JMR	Mercedes-AMG GT3 Evo	Pro-Am	LEC	SPA; 6H; 52†	SPA; 12H; Ret	SPA; 24H; Ret	NÜR	MNZ	JED	NC	0

=== Complete Asian Le Mans Series results ===
(key) (Races in bold indicate pole position) (Races in italics indicate fastest lap)

Year	Team	Class	Car	Engine	1	2	3	4	5	Pos.	Points
2023	Haupt Racing Team	GT	Mercedes-AMG GT3 Evo	Mercedes-AMG M159 6.2 L V8	DUB; 1; 3	DUB; 2; 7	ABU; 1; 1	ABU; 2; 1		2nd	71
2023–24	AlManar Racing by GetSpeed	GT	Mercedes-AMG GT3 Evo	Mercedes-AMG M159 6.2 L V8	SEP; 1; 4	SEP; 2; 4				26th	5
2023–24	GetSpeed Performance	GT	Mercedes-AMG GT3 Evo	Mercedes-AMG M159 6.2 L V8			DUB; Ret	ABU; 1; 15	ABU; 2 Ret	26th	5
