= 2023 GT World Challenge Europe Sprint Cup =

Motorsports season

The 2023 Fanatec GT World Challenge Europe Sprint Cup was the eleventh season of the GT World Challenge Europe Sprint Cup following on from the demise of the SRO Motorsports Group's FIA GT1 World Championship (an auto racing series for grand tourer cars), the third with the sponsorship of Fanatec.

The season began on 13 May at Brands Hatch in Kent and ended on 15 October at Circuit Zandvoort in the Netherlands.

== Calendar ==
The provisional calendar was released on 29 July 2022 at the SRO's annual 24 Hours of Spa press conference, featuring five rounds. Several adjustments were announced following the conflict between the Belgian Grand Prix and 24 Hours of Spa. The opening round was moved back two weeks, as was the round at Misano. The event at Zandvoort was moved to the season finale in October.

Round	Circuit	Date
1	(United Kingdom) Brands Hatch, Kent	13–14 May
2	(Italy) Misano World Circuit Marco Simoncelli, Misano Adriatico	15–16 July
3	(Germany) Hockenheimring, Hockenheim	2–3 September
4	(Spain) Circuit Ricardo Tormo, Cheste	16–17 September
5	(Netherlands) Circuit Zandvoort, Zandvoort	14–15 October

== Entry list ==
Team	Car	No.	Drivers	Class	Rounds
(Belgium) Boutsen VDS	Audi R8 LMS Evo II	9	(Italy) Alberto Di Folco	G	All
(Belgium) Boutsen VDS	Audi R8 LMS Evo II	9	(France) Aurélien Panis	G	All
(Belgium) Boutsen VDS	Audi R8 LMS Evo II	10	(France) Adam Eteki	G	All
(Belgium) Boutsen VDS	Audi R8 LMS Evo II	10	(France) César Gazeau	G	All
(Belgium) Comtoyou Racing	Audi R8 LMS Evo II	11	(Germany) Christopher Haase	P	All
(Belgium) Comtoyou Racing	Audi R8 LMS Evo II	11	(Switzerland) Lucas Légeret	P	All
(Belgium) Comtoyou Racing	Audi R8 LMS Evo II	12	(Belgium) Nicolas Baert	P	All
(Belgium) Comtoyou Racing	Audi R8 LMS Evo II	12	(Belgium) Frédéric Vervisch	P	All
(Belgium) Comtoyou Racing	Audi R8 LMS Evo II	21	(United Kingdom) Finlay Hutchison	G	All
(Belgium) Comtoyou Racing	Audi R8 LMS Evo II	21	(Belgium) Gilles Magnus	G	All
(Switzerland) Emil Frey Racing	Ferrari 296 GT3	14	(Italy) Giacomo Altoè	P	All
(Switzerland) Emil Frey Racing	Ferrari 296 GT3	14	(Finland) Konsta Lappalainen	P	All
(Switzerland) Emil Frey Racing	Ferrari 296 GT3	69	(Spain) Albert Costa	P	All
(Switzerland) Emil Frey Racing	Ferrari 296 GT3	69	(Netherlands) Thierry Vermeulen	P	All
(Monaco) GSM AB1 GT3 Team	Lamborghini Huracán GT3 Evo	18	(Italy) Nicholas Risitano	S	1–2
(Monaco) GSM AB1 GT3 Team	Lamborghini Huracán GT3 Evo	18	(Brazil) Fernando Croce	S	1
(Monaco) GSM AB1 GT3 Team	Lamborghini Huracán GT3 Evo	18	(Spain) Fidel Castillo	S	2
(Monaco) GSM AB1 GT3 Team	Lamborghini Huracán GT3 Evo	18	(Italy) Matteo Desideri	S	3
(Monaco) GSM AB1 GT3 Team	Lamborghini Huracán GT3 Evo	18	(Italy) Federico Scionti	S	3
(Monaco) GSM AB1 GT3 Team	Lamborghini Huracán GT3 Evo	18	(United Kingdom) James Kell	S	4
(Monaco) GSM AB1 GT3 Team	Lamborghini Huracán GT3 Evo	18	(South Africa) Jarrod Waberski	S	4
(Monaco) GSM AB1 GT3 Team	Lamborghini Huracán GT3 Evo	18	(United Kingdom) Harley Haughton	S	5
(Monaco) GSM AB1 GT3 Team	Lamborghini Huracán GT3 Evo	18	(Netherlands) Paul Meijer	S	5
(France) Saintéloc Junior Team	Audi R8 LMS Evo II	25	(France) Erwan Bastard	P	All
(France) Saintéloc Junior Team	Audi R8 LMS Evo II	25	(Switzerland) Patric Niederhauser	P	All
(France) Saintéloc Junior Team	Audi R8 LMS Evo II	26	(France) Paul Evrard	G	All
(France) Saintéloc Junior Team	Audi R8 LMS Evo II	26	(France) Simon Gachet	G	All
(France) Saintéloc Junior Team	Audi R8 LMS Evo II	27	(France) Grégoire Demoustier	P	All
(France) Saintéloc Junior Team	Audi R8 LMS Evo II	27	(Germany) Christopher Mies	P	All
(Italy) Nova Race	Honda NSX GT3 Evo22	28	(Italy) Jacopo Guidetti	S	All
(Italy) Nova Race	Honda NSX GT3 Evo22	28	(Italy) Leonardo Moncini	S	All
(Italy) Nova Race	Honda NSX GT3 Evo22	68	(Italy) Erwin Zanotti	S	All
(Italy) Nova Race	Honda NSX GT3 Evo22	68	(Italy) Diego Di Fabio	S	1–3
(Italy) Nova Race	Honda NSX GT3 Evo22	68	(Italy) Alex Frassinetti	S	4–5
(Belgium) Team WRT	BMW M4 GT3	30	(Germany) Niklas Krütten	G	All
(Belgium) Team WRT	BMW M4 GT3	30	(Australia) Calan Williams	G	All
(Belgium) Team WRT	BMW M4 GT3	31	(France) Thomas Neubauer	P	All
(Belgium) Team WRT	BMW M4 GT3	31	(France) Jean-Baptiste Simmenauer	P	All
(Belgium) Team WRT	BMW M4 GT3	32	(Belgium) Dries Vanthoor	P	All
(Belgium) Team WRT	BMW M4 GT3	32	(Belgium) Charles Weerts	P	All
(Belgium) Team WRT	BMW M4 GT3	46	(Belgium) Maxime Martin	P	All
(Belgium) Team WRT	BMW M4 GT3	46	(Italy) Valentino Rossi	P	All
(Germany) Tresor Orange1	Audi R8 LMS Evo II	40	(San Marino) Mattia Drudi	P	All
(Germany) Tresor Orange1	Audi R8 LMS Evo II	40	(Switzerland) Ricardo Feller	P	All
(Germany) Tresor Attempto Racing	Audi R8 LMS Evo II	66	(Germany) Dennis Marschall	B	2–4
(Germany) Tresor Attempto Racing	Audi R8 LMS Evo II	66	Andrey Mukovoz (Note: Boguslavskiy and Mukovoz are Russian, but they compete as neutral competitors as Russian national emblems were banned by the FIA following the Russian invasion of Ukraine. Gvazava, also a Russian, competes under a Kyrgyz licence for the same reason.)	B	2–4
(Germany) Tresor Attempto Racing	Audi R8 LMS Evo II	99	(Germany) Alex Aka	S	All
(Germany) Tresor Attempto Racing	Audi R8 LMS Evo II	99	(Italy) Lorenzo Patrese	S	All
(Germany) Tresor Attempto Racing	Audi R8 LMS Evo II	333	(Italy) Alessio Deledda	S	2
(Germany) Tresor Attempto Racing	Audi R8 LMS Evo II	333	(Italy) Pietro Delli Guanti	S	2
(France) CLRT	Porsche 911 GT3 R (992)	44	(France) Steven Palette	B	2–4
(France) CLRT	Porsche 911 GT3 R (992)	44	(Italy) Marco Cassarà	B	2
(France) CLRT	Porsche 911 GT3 R (992)	44	(France) Stéphane Denoual	B	3–4
(France) CLRT	Porsche 911 GT3 R (992)	44	(Turkey) Ayhancan Güven	P	5
(France) CLRT	Porsche 911 GT3 R (992)	44	(Germany) Laurin Heinrich	P	5
(Italy) AF Corse	Ferrari 296 GT3	52	(Belgium) Louis Machiels	B	2–4
(Italy) AF Corse	Ferrari 296 GT3	52	(Italy) Andrea Bertolini	B	2–3
(Italy) AF Corse	Ferrari 296 GT3	52	(Belgium) Jef Machiels	B	4
(Italy) AF Corse	Ferrari 488 GT3 Evo 2020 1 Ferrari 296 GT3 2–4	71	(Singapore) Sean Hudspeth	S	All
(Italy) AF Corse	Ferrari 488 GT3 Evo 2020 1 Ferrari 296 GT3 2–4	71	(Italy) Nicola Marinangeli	S	All
(Italy) Dinamic GT Huber Racing	Porsche 911 GT3 R (992)	54	(Belgium) Adrien de Leener	P	All
(Italy) Dinamic GT Huber Racing	Porsche 911 GT3 R (992)	54	(Germany) Christian Engelhart	P	All
(Italy) Dinamic GT Huber Racing	Porsche 911 GT3 R (992)	55	(Austria) Philipp Sager	B	2–4
(Italy) Dinamic GT Huber Racing	Porsche 911 GT3 R (992)	55	(Austria) Christopher Zöchling	B	2–4
(Italy) VSR	Lamborghini Huracán GT3 Evo 2	60	(South Africa) Jordan Pepper	P	1–3
(Italy) VSR	Lamborghini Huracán GT3 Evo 2	60	(France) Franck Perera	P	1–3
(Italy) VSR	Lamborghini Huracán GT3 Evo 2	60	(Italy) Andrea Caldarelli	P	4–5
(Italy) VSR	Lamborghini Huracán GT3 Evo 2	60	(Italy) Marco Mapelli	P	4–5
(Italy) VSR	Lamborghini Huracán GT3 Evo 2	119	(Belgium) Baptiste Moulin	S	1–4
(Italy) VSR	Lamborghini Huracán GT3 Evo 2	119	(Norway) Marcus Påverud	S	1–4
(Italy) VSR	Lamborghini Huracán GT3 Evo 2	163	(Japan) Yuki Nemoto	S	1–4
(Italy) VSR	Lamborghini Huracán GT3 Evo 2	163	(Switzerland) Rolf Ineichen	S	1, 3
(Italy) VSR	Lamborghini Huracán GT3 Evo 2	163	(Italy) Mattia Michelotto	S	2
(Italy) VSR	Lamborghini Huracán GT3 Evo 2	163	(Germany) Maximilian Paul	S	4–5
(Italy) VSR	Lamborghini Huracán GT3 Evo 2	163	(Norway) Marcus Påverud	S	5
(Germany) Paul Motorsport	Lamborghini Huracán GT3 Evo	65	(Germany) Maximilian Paul	S	3
(Germany) Paul Motorsport	Lamborghini Huracán GT3 Evo	65	(Germany) Simon Connor Primm	S	3
(Germany) Haupt Racing Team	Mercedes-AMG GT3 Evo	77	(Australia) Jordan Love	S	All
(Germany) Haupt Racing Team	Mercedes-AMG GT3 Evo	77	(United Kingdom) Frank Bird	S	1–2, 5
(Germany) Haupt Racing Team	Mercedes-AMG GT3 Evo	77	(Switzerland) Alain Valente	S	3–4
(Germany) Haupt Racing Team	Mercedes-AMG GT3 Evo	79	(France) Sébastien Baud	B	2–4
(Germany) Haupt Racing Team	Mercedes-AMG GT3 Evo	79	(Germany) Hubert Haupt	B	2–4
(Saudi Arabia) Theeba Motorsport	Mercedes-AMG GT3 Evo	81	(Saudi Arabia) Reema Juffali	B	2–4
(Saudi Arabia) Theeba Motorsport	Mercedes-AMG GT3 Evo	81	(Germany) Fabian Schiller	B	2–4
(France) AKKodis ASP Team	Mercedes-AMG GT3 Evo	87	(France) Eric Debard	B	2–4
(France) AKKodis ASP Team	Mercedes-AMG GT3 Evo	87	(France) Jim Pla	B	2–4
(France) AKKodis ASP Team	Mercedes-AMG GT3 Evo	88	Timur Boguslavskiy	P	All
(France) AKKodis ASP Team	Mercedes-AMG GT3 Evo	88	(Switzerland) Raffaele Marciello	P	All
(Spain) Madpanda Motorsport	Mercedes-AMG GT3 Evo	90	(Argentina) Ezequiel Pérez Companc	S	All
(Spain) Madpanda Motorsport	Mercedes-AMG GT3 Evo	90	(Finland) Jesse Salmenautio	S	All
(Germany) Herberth Motorsport	Porsche 911 GT3 R (992)	91	(Germany) Ralf Bohn	B	2–4
(Germany) Herberth Motorsport	Porsche 911 GT3 R (992)	91	(Germany) Robert Renauer	B	2–4
(Lithuania) Pure Rxcing	Porsche 911 GT3 R (992)	911	(United Kingdom) Alex Malykhin (Note: Malykhin is Belarusian, but he competes under a British licence as Belarusian national emblems were banned by the FIA following the Russian invasion of Ukraine.)	B	2–4
(Lithuania) Pure Rxcing	Porsche 911 GT3 R (992)	911	(Turkey) Ayhancan Güven	B	2, 4
(Lithuania) Pure Rxcing	Porsche 911 GT3 R (992)	911	(Austria) Klaus Bachler	B	3
(Luxembourg) JP Motorsport	McLaren 720S GT3 Evo	111	(Austria) Christian Klien	P	All
(Luxembourg) JP Motorsport	McLaren 720S GT3 Evo	111	(United Kingdom) Dean MacDonald	P	All
(Luxembourg) JP Motorsport	McLaren 720S GT3 Evo	112	(Poland) Patryk Krupiński	B	2–3
(Luxembourg) JP Motorsport	McLaren 720S GT3 Evo	112	(Austria) Norbert Siedler	B	2–3
(Luxembourg) JP Motorsport	McLaren 720S GT3 Evo	112	(Poland) Patryk Krupiński	G	5
(Luxembourg) JP Motorsport	McLaren 720S GT3 Evo	112	(Austria) Norbert Siedler	G	5
(Italy) Imperiale Racing	Lamborghini Huracán GT3 Evo	126	(Kyrgyzstan) Dmitry Gvazava	B	2
(Italy) Imperiale Racing	Lamborghini Huracán GT3 Evo	126	(Italy) Loris Spinelli	B	2
(United Kingdom) Garage 59	McLaren 720S GT3 Evo	159	(Germany) Benjamin Goethe	P	All
(United Kingdom) Garage 59	McLaren 720S GT3 Evo	159	(Denmark) Nicolai Kjærgaard	P	All
(United Kingdom) Garage 59	McLaren 720S GT3 Evo	188	(Portugal) Henrique Chaves	B	2–4
(United Kingdom) Garage 59	McLaren 720S GT3 Evo	188	(Portugal) Miguel Ramos	B	2–4

Icon	Class
P	Pro Cup
G	Gold Cup
S	Silver Cup
B	Bronze Cup

== Race results ==
Round		Circuit	Pole position	Overall winners	Gold winners	Silver winners	Bronze winners	Report
1	R1	(United Kingdom) Brands Hatch	(France) No. 88 AKKodis ASP Team	(France) No. 88 AKKodis ASP Team	(Belgium) No. 9 Boutsen VDS	(Germany) No. 99 Tresor Atttempto Racing	Did not participate	Report
1	R1	(United Kingdom) Brands Hatch	Timur Boguslavskiy (Switzerland) Raffaele Marciello	Timur Boguslavskiy (Switzerland) Raffaele Marciello	(Italy) Alberto Di Folco (France) Aurélien Panis	(Germany) Alex Aka (Italy) Lorenzo Patrese	Did not participate	Report
1	R2	(United Kingdom) Brands Hatch	(France) No. 27 Saintéloc Junior Team	(Germany) No. 40 Tresor Orange1	(Belgium) No. 30 Team WRT	(Italy) No. 119 VSR	Did not participate	Report
1	R2	(United Kingdom) Brands Hatch	(France) Grégoire Demoustier (Germany) Christopher Mies	(San Marino) Mattia Drudi (Switzerland) Ricardo Feller	(Germany) Niklas Krütten (Australia) Calan Williams	(Belgium) Baptiste Moulin (Norway) Marcus Påverud	Did not participate	Report
2	R1	(Italy) Misano	(France) No. 88 AKKodis ASP Team	(France) No. 88 AKKodis ASP Team	(Belgium) No. 9 Boutsen VDS	(Germany) No. 77 Haupt Racing Team	(United Kingdom) No. 188 Garage 59	Report
2	R1	(Italy) Misano	Timur Boguslavskiy (Switzerland) Raffaele Marciello	Timur Boguslavskiy (Switzerland) Raffaele Marciello	(Italy) Alberto Di Folco (France) Aurélien Panis	(United Kingdom) Frank Bird (Australia) Jordan Love	(Portugal) Henrique Chaves (Portugal) Miguel Ramos	Report
2	R2	(Italy) Misano	(Belgium) No. 32 Team WRT	(Belgium) No. 46 Team WRT	(Belgium) No. 30 Team WRT	(Germany) No. 99 Tresor Attempto Racing	(United Kingdom) No. 188 Garage 59	Report
2	R2	(Italy) Misano	(Belgium) Dries Vanthoor (Belgium) Charles Weerts	(Belgium) Maxime Martin (Italy) Valentino Rossi	(Germany) Niklas Krütten (Australia) Calan Williams	(Germany) Alex Aka (Italy) Lorenzo Patrese	(Portugal) Henrique Chaves (Portugal) Miguel Ramos	Report
3	R1	(Germany) Hockenheim	(Italy) No. 60 VSR	(Germany) No. 40 Tresor Orange1	(Belgium) No. 30 Team WRT	(Germany) No. 77 Haupt Racing Team	(Germany) No. 66 Tresor Attempto Racing	Report
3	R1	(Germany) Hockenheim	(South Africa) Jordan Pepper (France) Franck Perera	(San Marino) Mattia Drudi (Switzerland) Ricardo Feller	(Germany) Niklas Krütten (Australia) Calan Williams	(Australia) Jordan Love (Switzerland) Alain Valente	(Germany) Dennis Marschall; Andrey Mukovoz	Report
3	R2	(Germany) Hockenheim	(Germany) No. 40 Tresor Orange1	(France) No. 88 AKKodis ASP Team	(Belgium) No. 9 Boutsen VDS	(Germany) No. 99 Tresor Attempto Racing	(Germany) No. 79 Haupt Racing Team	Report
3	R2	(Germany) Hockenheim	(San Marino) Mattia Drudi (Switzerland) Ricardo Feller	Timur Boguslavskiy (Switzerland) Raffaele Marciello	(Italy) Alberto Di Folco (France) Aurélien Panis	(Germany) Alex Aka (Italy) Lorenzo Patrese	(France) Sébastien Baud (Germany) Hubert Haupt	Report
4	R1	(Spain) Valencia	(Germany) No. 66 Tresor Attempto Racing	(France) No. 88 AKKodis ASP Team	(Belgium) No. 21 Comtoyou Racing	(Germany) No. 99 Tresor Attempto Racing	(Germany) No. 66 Tresor Attempto Racing	Report
4	R1	(Spain) Valencia	(Germany) Dennis Marschall; Andrey Mukovoz	Timur Boguslavskiy (Switzerland) Raffaele Marciello	(United Kingdom) Finlay Hutchison (Belgium) Gilles Magnus	(Germany) Alex Aka (Italy) Lorenzo Patrese	(Germany) Dennis Marschall; Andrey Mukovoz	Report
4	R2	(Spain) Valencia	(France) No. 26 Saintéloc Junior Team	(Belgium) No. 32 Team WRT	(France) No. 26 Saintéloc Junior Team	(Germany) No. 99 Tresor Attempto Racing	(Lithuania) No. 911 Pure Rxcing	Report
4	R2	(Spain) Valencia	(France) Paul Evrard (France) Simon Gachet	(Belgium) Dries Vanthoor (Belgium) Charles Weerts	(France) Paul Evrard (France) Simon Gachet	(Germany) Alex Aka (Italy) Lorenzo Patrese	(United Kingdom) Alex Malykhin (Turkey) Ayhancan Güven	Report
5	R1	(Netherlands) Zandvoort	(Germany) No. 40 Tresor Orange1	(Germany) No. 40 Tresor Orange1	(Belgium) No. 10 Boutsen VDS	(Germany) No. 77 Haupt Racing Team	Did not participate	Report
5	R1	(Netherlands) Zandvoort	(San Marino) Mattia Drudi (Switzerland) Ricardo Feller	(San Marino) Mattia Drudi (Switzerland) Ricardo Feller	(France) Adam Eteki (France) César Gazeau	(Australia) Jordan Love (United Kingdom) Frank Bird	Did not participate	Report
5	R2	(Netherlands) Zandvoort	(Belgium) No. 46 Team WRT	(Germany) No. 40 Tresor Orange1	(Belgium) No. 30 Team WRT	(Germany) No. 77 Haupt Racing Team	Did not participate	Report
5	R2	(Netherlands) Zandvoort	(Belgium) Maxime Martin (Italy) Valentino Rossi	(San Marino) Mattia Drudi (Switzerland) Ricardo Feller	(Germany) Niklas Krütten (Australia) Calan Williams	(Australia) Jordan Love (United Kingdom) Frank Bird	Did not participate	Report

== Championship standings ==
Scoring system

Championship points are awarded for the first ten positions in each race. The pole-sitter also receives one point.

Position	1st	2nd	3rd	4th	5th	6th	7th	8th	9th	10th	Pole
Points	16.5	12	9.5	7.5	6	4.5	3	2	1	0.5	1

=== Drivers' championships ===
==== Overall ====
Pos.	Drivers	Team	BRH (United Kingdom)		MIS (Italy)		HOC (Germany)		VAL (Spain)		ZAN (Netherlands)		Points
1	(San Marino) Mattia Drudi (Switzerland) Ricardo Feller	(Germany) Tresor Orange1	2	1	10	Ret	1^{F}	4^{P}	3	2^{F}	1^{P}	1	109.5
2	Timur Boguslavskiy (Switzerland) Raffaele Marciello	(France) AKKodis ASP Team	1^{PF}	6	1^{P}	4	Ret	1	1	7	4	Ret	90.5
3	(Belgium) Dries Vanthoor (Belgium) Charles Weerts	(Belgium) Team WRT	3	3	3^{F}	9^{P}	3	5	5	1	5	2	86.5
4	(Spain) Albert Costa (Netherlands) Thierry Vermeulen	(Switzerland) Emil Frey Racing	7	23^{F}	5	5	4	6	2	3	2	8	62.5
5	(Italy) Valentino Rossi (Belgium) Maxime Martin	(Belgium) Team WRT	14	2	8	1	8	7	8^{F}	Ret	3	7^{PF}	50
6	(Germany) Christopher Haase (Switzerland) Lucas Légeret	(Belgium) Comtoyou Racing	4	5	9	2	7	2	4	9	Ret^{F}	12	50
7	(Italy) Giacomo Altoè (Finland) Konsta Lappalainen	(Switzerland) Emil Frey Racing	5	8	2	6	Ret	12	7	5	10	5	41
8	(Belgium) Nicolas Baert (Belgium) Frédéric Vervisch	(Belgium) Comtoyou Racing	8	20	4	15	2	16	6	10	9	Ret	27.5
9	(Germany) Niklas Krütten (Australia) Calan Williams	(Belgium) Team WRT	15	7	11	11	5	30	Ret	18	13	3	18.5
10	(France) Erwan Bastard (Switzerland) Patric Niederhauser	(France) Saintéloc Junior Team	28†	10	17	7	31†	3	12	17	Ret	Ret	13
11	(France) Thomas Neubauer (France) Jean-Baptiste Simmenauer	(Belgium) Team WRT	13	14	15	3	11	11	16	29	7	13	12.5
12	(South Africa) Jordan Pepper (France) Franck Perera	(Italy) VSR	6	25†	7	8	32†^{P}	9					11.5
13	(Germany) Benjamin Goethe (Denmark) Nicolai Kjærgaard	(United Kingdom) Garage 59	16	4	Ret	10	Ret	34†	9	15	17	9	10
14	(Italy) Andrea Caldarelli (Italy) Marco Mapelli	(Italy) VSR							15	12	8	4	9.5
15	(Australia) Jordan Love	(Germany) Haupt Racing Team	20	16	12	16	12	14	11	13	6	6	9
15	(United Kingdom) Frank Bird	(Germany) Haupt Racing Team	20	16	12	16					6	6	9
16	(Germany) Alex Aka (Italy) Lorenzo Patrese	(Germany) Tresor Attempto Racing	10	21	18	12	33†	13	10	4	12	25†	8.5
17	(Italy) Alberto Di Folco (France) Aurélien Panis	(Belgium) Boutsen VDS	9	26	6	Ret	10	10	29	8	20	17	8.5
18	(France) Paul Evrard (France) Simon Gachet	(France) Saintéloc Junior Team	11	13	19	24	13	Ret	21	6^{P}	24	15	5.5
19	(France) Adam Eteki (France) César Gazeau	(Belgium) Boutsen VDS	12	28†	14	17	6	19	36†	24	11	26†	4.5
20	(Belgium) Adrien de Leener (Germany) Christian Engelhart	(Italy) Dinamic GT Huber Racing	DSQ	12	20	Ret	9	8	17	16	Ret	16	3
21	(United Kingdom) Finlay Hutchison (Belgium) Gilles Magnus	(Belgium) Comtoyou Racing	17	9	Ret	19	26	15	14	14	14	11	1
22	(Germany) Dennis Marschall; Andrey Mukovoz	(Germany) Tresor Attempto Racing			36	22^{F}	18	DSQ^{F}	18^{P}	23			1
22	(Germany) Christopher Mies (France) Grégoire Demoustier	(France) Saintéloc Junior Team	19	17^{P}	22	18	23	Ret	Ret	Ret	Ret	22	1
23	(Turkey) Ayhancan Güven	(Lithuania) Pure Rxcing			21	21			19	19			0.5
23	(Turkey) Ayhancan Güven	(France) CLRT									16	10	0.5
23	(Germany) Laurin Heinrich	(France) CLRT									16	10	0.5
-	(Austria) Christian Klien (United Kingdom) Dean MacDonald	(Luxembourg) JP Motorsport	21	11	Ret	37†	30†	Ret	13	11	23	18	0
-	(Switzerland) Alain Valente	(Germany) Haupt Racing Team					12	14	11	13			0
-	(Portugal) Henrique Chaves (Portugal) Miguel Ramos	(United Kingdom) Garage 59			13	20	29	23	22	25			0
-	(Japan) Yuki Nemoto	(Italy) VSR	22	22	Ret	13	16	21	20	Ret			0
-	(Italy) Mattia Michelotto	(Italy) VSR			Ret	13							0
-	(Argentina) Ezequiel Pérez Companc (Finland) Jesse Salmenautio	(Spain) Madpanda Motorsport	25	18	16	14	14	17	25	22	15	14	0
-	(Belgium) Baptiste Moulin	(Italy) VSR	24	15	27	35†	Ret	28	Ret	Ret			0
-	(Norway) Marcus Påverud	(Italy) VSR	24	15	27	35†	Ret	28	Ret	Ret	19	20	0
-	(Germany) Simon Connor Primm	(Germany) Paul Motorsport					15	Ret					0
-	(Germany) Maximilian Paul	(Germany) Paul Motorsport					15	Ret					0
-	(Germany) Maximilian Paul	(Italy) VSR							20	Ret	18	20	0
-	(Switzerland) Rolf Ineichen	(Italy) VSR	22	22			16	21					0
-	(Singapore) Sean Hudspeth (Italy) Nicola Marinangeli	(Italy) AF Corse	23	Ret	28	26	17	24	31	26	21	19	0
-	(Italy) Jacopo Guidetti (Italy) Leonardo Moncini	(Italy) Nova Race	18	19	26	27	Ret	25	26	20	19	23	0
-	(France) Sébastien Baud (Germany) Hubert Haupt	(Germany) Haupt Racing Team			25	25	Ret	18	24	31			0
-	(Germany) Ralf Bohn (Germany) Robert Renauer	(Germany) Herbert Motorsport			29	23	19	20	23	27			0
-	(United Kingdom) Alex Malykhin	(Lithuania) Pure Rxcing			21	21	20	22	19	19			0
-	(Austria) Klaus Bachler	(Lithuania) Pure Rxcing					20	22					0
-	(Austria) Phillip Sager (Austria) Christopher Zöchling	(Italy) Dinamic GT Huber Racing			30	29	21	29	28	28			0
-	(Saudi Arabia) Reema Juffali (Germany) Fabian Schiller	(Saudi Arabia) Theeba Motorsport			24	Ret	22	32	30	21			0
-	(Italy) Erwin Zanotti	(Italy) Nova Race	26	24	34	32	24	25	32	33†	22	Ret	0
-	(Italy) Alex Frassinetti	(Italy) Nova Race							32	33†	22	Ret	0
-	(Poland) Patryk Krupiński (Austria) Norbert Siedler	(Luxembourg) JP Motorsport			23	Ret	25	Ret			25	21	0
-	(Italy) Diego Di Fabio	(Italy) Nova Race	26	24	34	32	24	25					0
-	(Netherlands) Paul Meijer (United Kingdom) Harley Haughton	(Monaco) GSM AB1 GT3 Team									Ret	24	0
-	(Italy) Nicholas Risitano	(Monaco) GSM AB1 GT3 Team	27	27	37	34							0
-	(Brazil) Fernando Croce	(Monaco) GSM AB1 GT3 Team	27	27									0
-	(Italy) Matteo Desideri (Italy) Federico Scionti	(Monaco) GSM AB1 GT3 Team					27	33					0
-	(Belgium) Louis Machiels	(Italy) AF Corse			35	30	Ret	27	35	32			0
-	(Italy) Andrea Bertolini	(Italy) AF Corse			35	30	Ret	27					0
-	(France) Eric Debard (France) Jim Pla	(France) AKKodis ASP Team			33	31	Ret	31	27	Ret			0
-	(Italy) Alessio Deledda (Italy) Pietro Delli Guanti	(Germany) Tresor Attempto Racing			31	28							0
-	(France) Steven Palette	(France) CLRT			32	36†	28	Ret	33	Ret			0
-	(France) Stéphane Denoual	(France) CLRT					28	Ret	33	Ret			0
-	(United Kingdom) James Kell (South Africa) Jarrod Waberski	(Monaco) GSM AB1 GT3 Team							34	30			0
-	(Italy) Marco Cassarà	(France) CLRT			32	36†							0
-	(Belgium) Jef Machiels	(Italy) AF Corse							35	32			0
-	(Kyrgyzstan) Dmitry Gvazava (Italy) Loris Spinelli	(Italy) Imperiale Racing			Ret	33							0
-	(Spain) Fidel Castillo	(Monaco) GSM AB1 GT3 Team			37	34							0
Pos.	Drivers	Team	BRH (United Kingdom)		MIS (Italy)		HOC (Germany)		VAL (Spain)		ZAN (Netherlands)		Points

Key
Colour	Result
Gold	Race winner
Silver	2nd place
Bronze	3rd place
Green	Points finish
Blue	Non-points finish
Blue	Non-classified finish (NC)
Purple	Did not finish (Ret)
Black	Disqualified (DSQ)
Black	Excluded (EX)
White	Did not start (DNS)
White	Race cancelled (C)
White	Withdrew (WD)
Blank	Did not participate

P – Pole
F – Fastest Lap

==== Gold Cup ====
Pos.	Drivers	Team	BRH (United Kingdom)		MIS (Italy)		HOC (Germany)		VAL (Spain)		ZAN (Netherlands)		Points
1	(Germany) Niklas Krütten (Australia) Calan Williams	(Belgium) Team WRT	15^{F}	7^{F}	11	11	5	30^{F}	Ret	18	13	3^{PF}	113.5
2	(Italy) Alberto Di Folco (France) Aurélien Panis	(Belgium) Boutsen VDS	9^{P}	26	6^{F}	Ret	10^{F}	10^{P}	29	8	20	17	105
3	(United Kingdom) Finlay Hutchison (Belgium) Gilles Magnus	(Belgium) Comtoyou Racing	17	9^{P}	Ret^{P}	19^{F}	26^{P}	15	14^{P}	14	14^{P}	11	98
4	(France) Adam Eteki (France) César Gazeau	(Belgium) Boutsen VDS	12	28†	14	17	6	19	36†	24	11^{F}	26†	93
5	(France) Paul Evrard (France) Simon Gachet	(France) Saintéloc Junior Team	11	13	19	24^{P}	13	Ret	21^{F}	6^{PF}	24	15	90
6	(Poland) Patryk Krupiński (Austria) Norbert Siedler	(Luxembourg) JP Motorsport									25	21	10.5
Pos.	Drivers	Team	BRH (United Kingdom)		MIS (Italy)		HOC (Germany)		VAL (Spain)		ZAN (Netherlands)		Points

==== Silver Cup ====
Pos.	Drivers	Team	BRH (United Kingdom)		MIS (Italy)		HOC (Germany)		VAL (Spain)		ZAN (Netherlands)		Points
1	(Australia) Jordan Love	(Germany) Haupt Racing Team	20^{F}	16	12^{P}	16	12^{P}	14	11^{P}	13	6^{F}	6^{P}	135
2	(Germany) Alex Aka (Italy) Lorenzo Patrese	(Germany) Tresor Attempto Racing	10^{P}	21^{F}	18^{F}	12^{F}	33†	13^{F}	10^{F}	4^{PF}	12^{P}	25†^{F}	118
3	(Argentina) Ezequiel Pérez Companc (Finland) Jesse Salmenautio	(Spain) Madpanda Motorsport	25	18	16	14	14	17	25	22	15	14	92
4	(United Kingdom) Frank Bird	(Germany) Haupt Racing Team	20^{F}	16	12^{P}	16					6^{F}	6^{P}	80.5
5	(Italy) Jacopo Guidetti (Italy) Leonardo Moncini	(Italy) Nova Race	18	19	26	27	Ret	25	26	20	19	23	63.5
6	(Singapore) Sean Hudspeth (Italy) Nicola Marinangeli	(Italy) AF Corse	23	Ret^{P}	28	26^{P}	17	24	31	26	21	19	55
7	(Switzerland) Alain Valente	(Germany) Haupt Racing Team					12^{P}	14	11^{P}	13			54.5
8	(Japan) Yuki Nemoto	(Italy) VSR	22	22	Ret	13	16	21	20	Ret			48.5
9	(Norway) Marcus Påverud	(Italy) VSR	24	15	27	35†	Ret	28	Ret	Ret	18	20	44.5
10	(Germany) Maximilian Paul	(Germany) Paul Motorsport					15^{F}	Ret^{P}					35
10	(Germany) Maximilian Paul	(Italy) VSR							20	Ret	18	20	35
11	(Belgium) Baptiste Moulin	(Italy) VSR	24	15	27	35†	Ret	28	Ret	Ret			29.5
12	(Switzerland) Rolf Ineichen	(Italy) VSR	22	22			16	21					27
13	(Italy) Erwin Zanotti	(Italy) Nova Race	26	24	34	32	24	26	32	33†	22	Ret	25.5
14	(Italy) Diego Di Fabio	(Italy) Nova Race	26	24	34	32	24	26					16.5
15	(Italy) Mattia Michelotto	(Italy) VSR			Ret	13							12
16	(Germany) Simon Connor Primm	(Germany) Paul Motorsport					15^{F}	Ret^{P}					10.5
17	(Italy) Alex Frassinetti	(Italy) Nova Race							32	33†	22	Ret	9
18	(United Kingdom) James Kell (South Africa) Jarrod Waberski	(Monaco) GSM AB1 GT3 Team							34	30			6.5
19	(Italy) Alessio Deledda (Italy) Pietro Delli Guanti	(Germany) Tresor Attempto Racing			31	28							6
20	(Italy) Nicholas Risitano	(Monaco) GSM AB1 GT3 Team	27	27	37	34							5
21	(Netherlands) Paul Meijer (United Kingdom) Harley Haughton	(Monaco) GSM AB1 GT3 Team									Ret	24	4.5
22	(Italy) Matteo Desideri (Italy) Federico Scionti	(Monaco) GSM AB1 GT3 Team					27	33					4
23	(Brazil) Fernando Croce	(Monaco) GSM AB1 GT3 Team	27	27									3
24	(Spain) Fidel Castillo	(Monaco) GSM AB1 GT3 Team			37	34							2
Pos.	Drivers	Team	BRH (United Kingdom)		MIS (Italy)		HOC (Germany)		VAL (Spain)		ZAN (Netherlands)		Points

==== Bronze Cup ====
Pos.	Drivers	Team	MIS (Italy)		HOC (Germany)		VAL (Spain)		Points
1	(United Kingdom) Alex Malykhin	(Lithuania) Pure Rxcing	21	21	20	22	19	19	71.5
2	(Portugal) Henrique Chaves (Portugal) Miguel Ramos	(United Kingdom) Garage 59	13^{PF}	20	29	23	22	25	60.5
3	(Germany) Dennis Marschall; Andrey Mukovoz	(Germany) Tresor Attempto Racing	36	22^{F}	18^{PF}	DSQ^{F}	18^{PF}	23^{F}	54
4	(Turkey) Ayhancan Güven	(Lithuania) Pure Rxcing	21	21			19	19	52.5
5	(Germany) Ralf Bohn (Germany) Robert Renauer	(Germany) Herberth Motorsport	29	23	19	20	23	27	49.5
6	(France) Sébastien Baud (Germany) Hubert Haupt	(Germany) Haupt Racing Team	25	25	Ret	18	24	31^{P}	38.5
7	(Saudi Arabia) Reema Juffali (Germany) Fabian Schiller	(Saudi Arabia) Theeba Motorsport	24	Ret	22	32^{P}	30	21	30.5
8	(Austria) Phillip Sager (Austria) Christopher Zöchling	(Italy) Dinamic GT Huber Racing	30	29	21	29	28	28	27
9	(Austria) Klaus Bachler	(Lithuania) Pure Rxcing			20	22			19
10	(Poland) Patryk Krupiński (Austria) Norbert Siedler	(Luxembourg) JP Motorsport	23	Ret	25	Ret			14
11	(Belgium) Louis Machiels	(Italy) AF Corse	35	30	Ret	27	35	32	12
12	(France) Eric Debard (France) Jim Pla	(France) AKKodis ASP Team	33	31	Ret	31	27	Ret	10.5
13	(Italy) Andrea Bertolini	(Italy) AF Corse	35	30	Ret	27			9.5
14	(France) Steven Palette	(France) CLRT	32	36†	28	Ret	33	Ret	6.5
15	(France) Stéphane Denoual	(France) CLRT			28	Ret	33	Ret	4
16	(Belgium) Jef Machiels	(Italy) AF Corse					35	32	2.5
16	(Italy) Marco Cassarà	(France) CLRT	32	36†					2.5
17	(Kyrgyzstan) Dmitry Gvazava (Italy) Loris Spinelli	(Italy) Imperiale Racing	Ret	33^{P}					2
Pos.	Drivers	Team	MIS (Italy)		HOC (Germany)		VAL (Spain)		Points

== See also ==
- 2023 British GT Championship
- 2023 GT World Challenge Europe
- 2023 GT World Challenge Europe Endurance Cup
- 2023 GT World Challenge Asia
- 2023 GT World Challenge America
- 2023 GT World Challenge Australia
- 2023 Intercontinental GT Challenge
