= Yannick Mettler =

Swiss racing driver (born 1989)

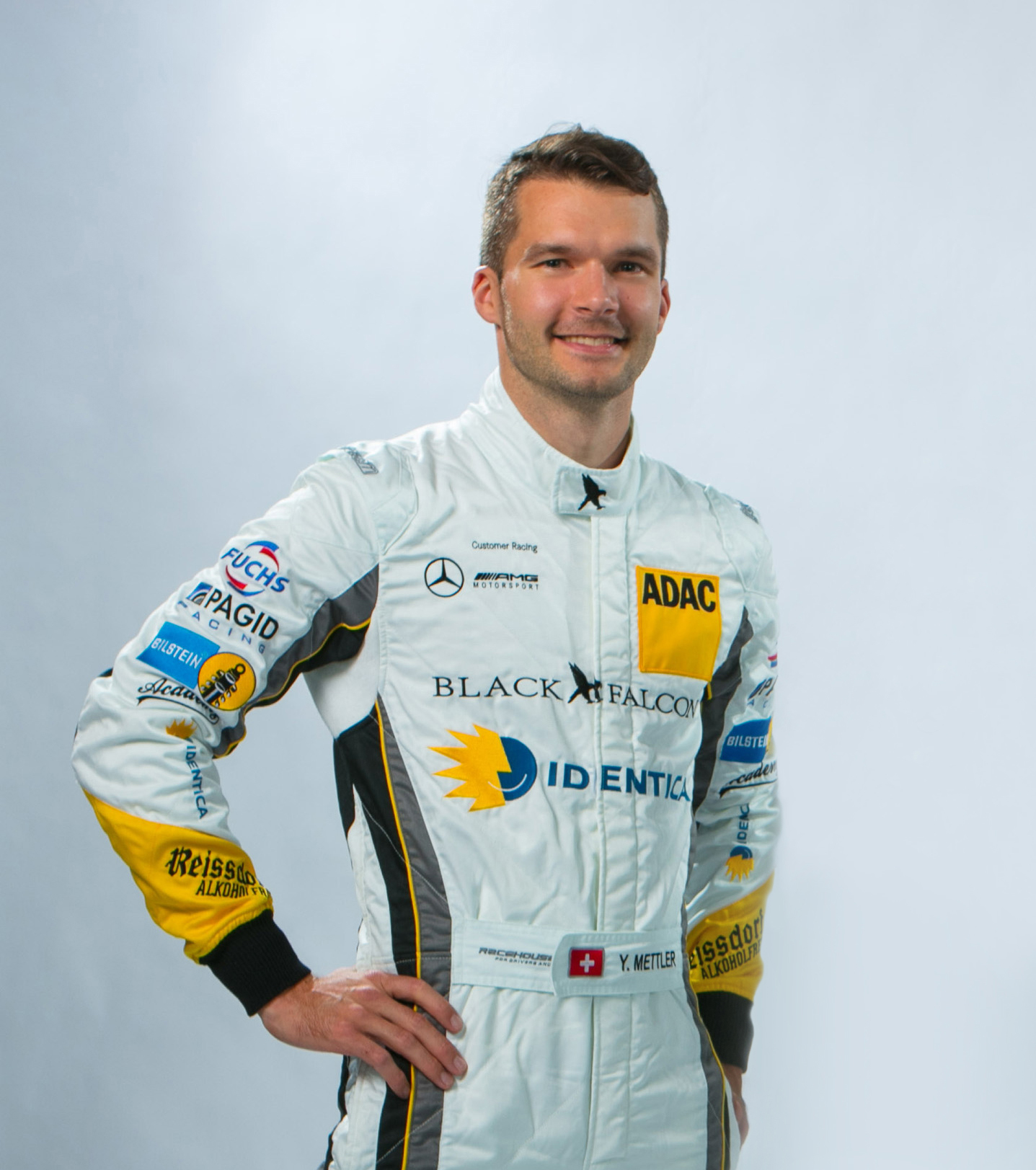
- Mettler in 2019
- Nationality: (Switzerland) Swiss
- Born: Yannick Amberg-Mettler; 26 October 1989 (age 37) Lucerne, Switzerland
- Categorisation: FIA Silver

Championship titles
- 2019 2018: 24H TCE Series Continents – TCR; VLN Series – SP10
Medal record
GT3
Representing Switzerland
FIA Motorsport Games
Bronze medal – third place	2024 Valencia	GT Cup

Yannick Amberg-Mettler (born 26 October 1989) is a Swiss racing driver who last competed in International GT Open, driving a Mercedes-AMG GT3 Evo for CBRX by SPS.

== Career ==
Mettler made his single-seater debut towards the end of 2009, competing at the Dijon round of the Formel Lista Junior series. After racing in the series full-time in 2010 and finishing runner-up in points with Daltec Racing, Mettler joined Bordoli-Motorsport to step up to the German Formula Three Championship in 2011. Following a scoreless rookie year, Mettler switched to Performance Racing for 2012, winning race two at Zandvoort and taking two other podiums to finish eighth in points. Continuing with Performance Racing through 2013 as a member of the FIA Institute Young Driver Excellence Academy, Mettler took a best result of fourth at Oschersleben before departing the team and the series three rounds into his campaign. Despite testing Formula Renault 2.0 machinery for RC Formula in early 2014, Mettler only raced once during the year, in a race-winning one-off appearance at the Slovakia Ring round of the Legend SuperCup season.

After obtaining his permit to race at the Nürburgring Nordschleife in 2015, Mettler joined FK Performance to compete in the VLN Series for the following two seasons in the BMW M235i class, during which he most notably won the 2017 24 Hours of Nürburgring in class. In 2018, Mettler joined Sorg Rennsport to move up to the SP10 class of the VLN Series, clinching the class title in his maiden season with the BMW M4 GT4. During 2018, Mettler also won the 24 Hours of Nürburgring in the KL Cup class and finished second at the Dubai 24 Hour in Cup 1 with the same team.

Stepping up to GT3 competition the following year, Mettler joined Mercedes-fielding SPS Automotive Performance to compete in the Le Mans Cup, scoring a pair of podiums at Le Castellet and Algarve to take fifth in points with Dexter Müller. During 2019, Mettler also won the 24H TCE Series Continents title in the TCR class for Autorama Motorsport, as well as winning the 24 Hours of Nürburgring for Mercedes-fielding Black Falcon in SP10. Continuing in GT3 machinery for 2020, Mettler joined Team Lazarus to share the team's Bentley Continental GT3 with Fabrizio Crestani in International GT Open. In his maiden season in the series, Mettler won at Monza from pole and took four other podiums en route to a fourth-place points finish. In parallel, Mettler also raced in the 24H TCE Series for Autorama Motorsport by Wolf-Power Racing, taking three TCR wins to end the season fifth in the Continents' standings and runner-up in Europe's.

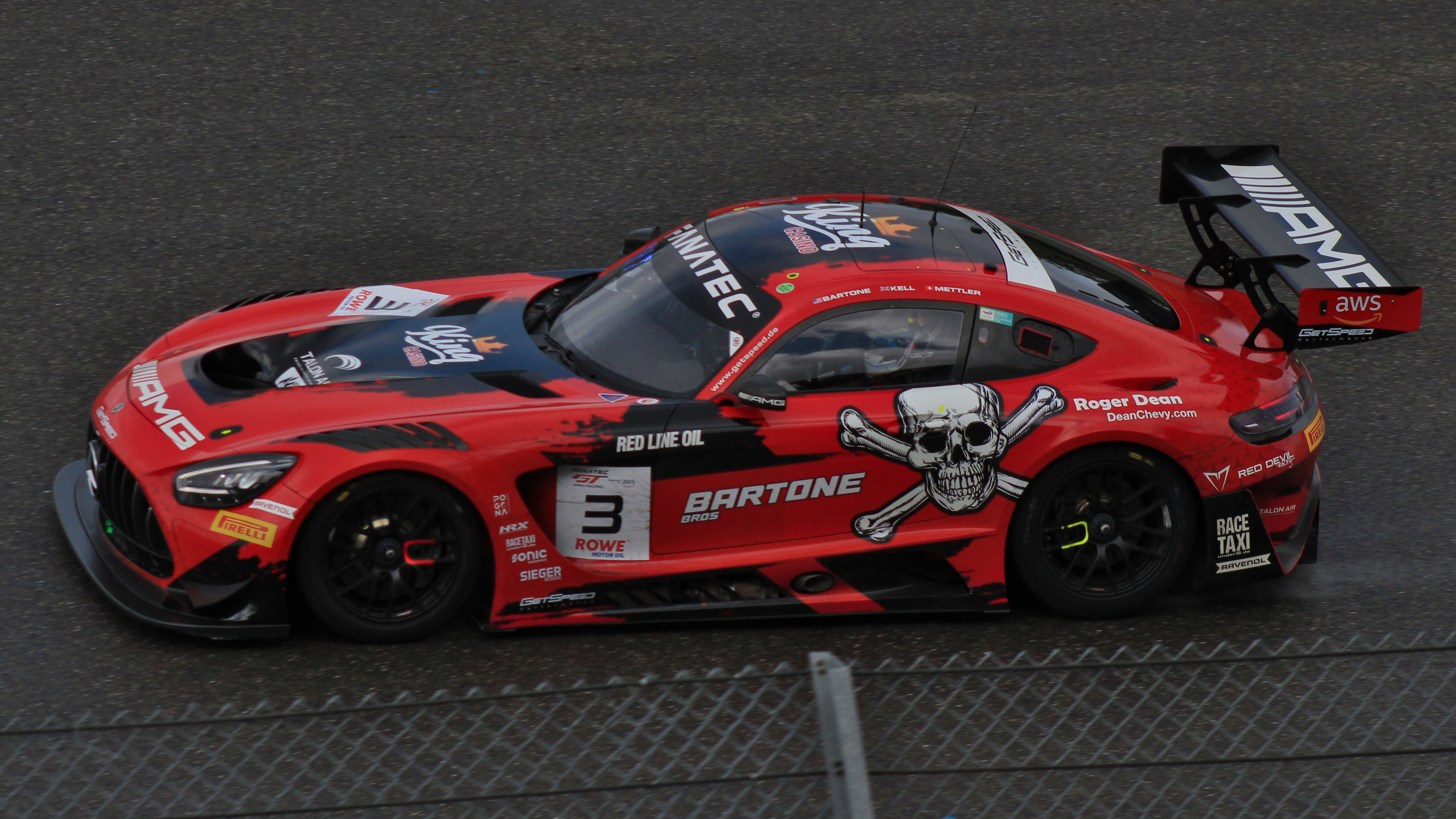
Mettler's GetSpeed Mercedes-AMG GT3 Evo at the Nürburgring round of the 2024 GT World Challenge Europe.

Moving to the GT World Challenge Europe Endurance Cup for 2021, Mettler joined SPS Automotive Performance to drive their Mercedes-AMG GT3 Evo alongside Miklas Born and Jordan Love. After an 18th-place finish in the Silver Cup, Mettler moved back to International GT Open, as he reunited with Dexter Müller to compete in Pro-Am for SPS. In his return, Mettler scored overall pole and a class win at Monza, as well as four other podiums to take third in Pro-Am. During 2022, Mettler also represented Switzerland at the FIA Motorsport Games GT Cup and GT Sprint disciplines. At the beginning of 2023, Mettler won the Dubai 24 Hour for AC Motorsport in the TCR class, and won the Kyalami 9 Hours in Pro-Am for SunEnergy1 Racing. For the rest of the year, Mettler and Müller returned to SPS for their second season in the International GT Open, scoring a Pro-Am win at Algarve and two other podiums to end the year fifth in points. During 2023, Mettler also raced at the 24 Hours of Spa for fellow Mercedes-AMG customer team Theeba Motorsport in the Bronze Cup.

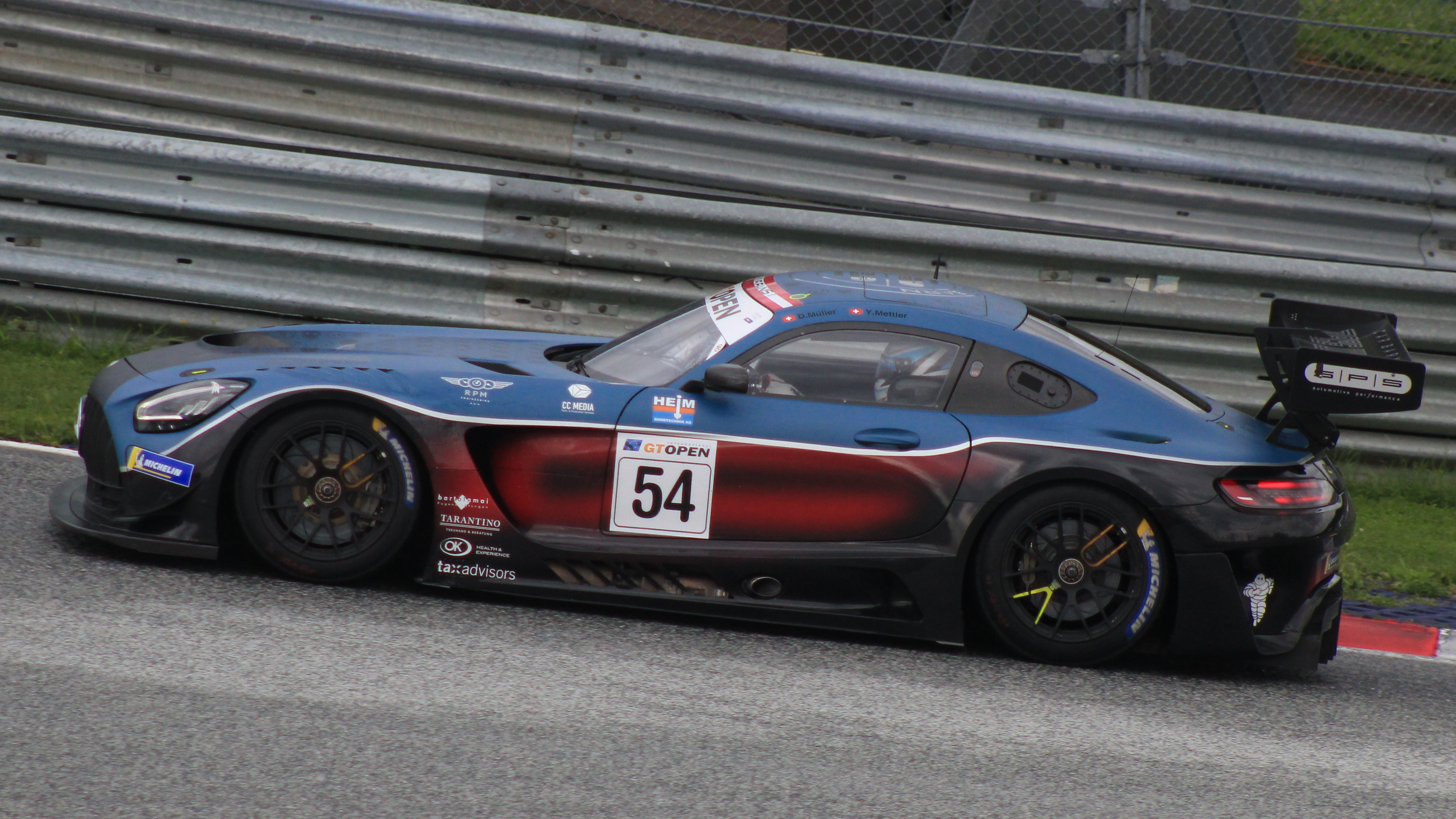
Mettler driving for SPS at the Red Bull Ring in International GT Open in 2024.

In 2024, Mettler joined AMG-affiliated GetSpeed to make his full-time return in the GT World Challenge Europe Endurance Cup alongside Anthony Bartone and James Kell. In his first season with the team, Mettler won the 24 Hours of Spa in the Silver class, helping him end the year fifth in the class standings. In parallel, Mettler continued in International GT Open with Dexter Müller, scoring a pair of Pro-Am podiums to end the season seventh in the standings. The SPS duo also represented Switzerland at the FIA Motorsport Games GT Cup and took Bronze medal in the main race. Towards the end of the year, Mettler raced for Porsche-fielding Car Collection Motorsport at the Indianapolis 8 Hours and the 2024–25 Asian Le Mans Series.

For 2025, Mettler linked up with Bartone and Karol Basz at GetSpeed in the GTWCE Endurance Cup Silver Cup, but found more success in the International GT Open for SPS Automotive Performance, taking a lone Pro-Am win at Barcelona and fourth in the class standings. In 2026, Mettler remained with SPS for a fifth season with Müller in International GT Open's Pro-Am class, as well as joining Team Motopark to compete at the 24 Hours of Spa in Silver Cup. In GT Open, Mettler took a lone class win at the Hockenheimring and six other podiums en route to sixth in the Pro-Am standings.

== Karting record ==
=== Karting career summary ===
Season	Series	Team	Position
2004	Swiss Championship — Junior	Kart-In	13th
2004	Dream Kart Cup — ICA Junior	Kart-In	4th
2005	Swiss Championship — ICA	Kart-In	14th
2005	Bridgestone Cup Switzerland — ICA		7th
2006	Swiss Championship — ICA	Kart-In	16th
2006	Andrea Margutti Trophy — ICA		NC
2006	Champions Cup — ICA		6th
2007	Swiss Championship — KF2	MGM Racing	4th
2007	Andrea Margutti Trophy — KF2		NC
2007	Championnat de France – KF2		57th
2007	Bridgestone Cup Switzerland — KF2		8th
2007	Karting European Championship – KF2		NC
2007	Champions Cup — KF2		5th
2008	Swiss Championship — KF2		19th
2008	Swiss Kart Challenge — KF2		1st
2008	German Challenger Kart Championship	Energy Corse	7th
2008	Karting European Championship — KF2	Energy Corse	46th
2009	Deutsche Kart-Meisterschaft — KF2	Baral Racing	20th
2009	Grand Prix Open Karting — KF2	Baral Racing	45th
2009	Karting European Championship — KF2	Baral Racing	NC

== Racing record ==
=== Racing career summary ===
Season	Series	Team	Races	Wins	Poles	F/Laps	Podiums	Points	Position
2009	Formel Lista Junior	Daltec Racing	2	0	0	0	0	1	19th
2010	Formel Lista Junior	Daltec Racing	12	2	4	2	8	162	**2nd**
2010	Formula BMW Pacific	Atlantic Racing Team	4	0	0	0	0	4	19th
2011	German Formula Three Championship	Bordoli-Motorsport	14	0	0	0	0	0	NC
2012	German Formula Three Championship	Performance Racing	26	1	0	0	3	131	8th
2013	German Formula Three Championship	Performance Racing	8	0	0	0	0	46	11th
2014	Legend SuperCup		4	1	0	0	2	135	11th
2016	VLN Series – BMW M235i Cup	FK Performance						72	6th
2016	24 Hours of Nürburgring – Cup 5	FK Performance	1	0	0	0	0	—N/a	4th
2017	VLN Series – BMW M235i Cup	FK Performance	9	0	0	3	2	116	6th
2017	24 Hours of Nürburgring – Cup 5	ADAC Team Weser Ems e.V.	1	1	0	0	1	—N/a	**1st**
2018	24H TCE Series Continents – Cup 1	Sorg Rennsport	1	0	0	0	1	28	NC
2018	VLN Series – SP10	Securtal Sorg Rennsport							**1st**
2018	24 Hours of Nürburgring – KL Cup	Securtal Sorg Rennsport	1	1	0	0	1	—N/a	**1st**
2019	24H TCE Series Continents – TCR	Autorama Motorsport by Wolf-Power Racing	3	2	0	0	3	82	**1st**
2019	Le Mans Cup – GT3	SPS Automotive Performance	7	0	0	1	2	66	5th
2019	VLN Series – SP8T	Black Falcon	2	1	0	0	2	16.67	12th
2019	VLN Series – Cup 5	FK Performance Motorsport	1	0	0	0	0	6.18	66th
2019	VLN Series – SP10	Black Falcon	1	0	0	0	0	5	29th
2019	24 Hours of Nürburgring – SP10	Black Falcon Team Identica	1	1	0	0	1	—N/a	**1st**
2020	24H TCE Series Continents – TCR	Autorama Motorsport by Wolf-Power Racing	4	3	0	0	3	65	5th
2020	24H TCE Series Europe – TCR	Autorama Motorsport by Wolf-Power Racing	4	2	0	0	3	82	**2nd**
2020	International GT Open	Lazarus Racing	2	0	0	0	0	80	4th
2020	International GT Open	Team Lazarus	8	1	0	0	4	80	4th
2021	24H TCE Series – TCR	Autorama Motorsport by Wolf-Power Racing	3	1	0	0	2	33	NC
2021	GT World Challenge Europe Endurance Cup	SPS Automotive Performance	5	0	0	0	0	0	NC
2021	GT World Challenge Europe Endurance Cup – Silver	SPS Automotive Performance	5	0	0	0	0	27	18th
2022	24H TCE Series Continents – TCR	AC Motorsport	1	0	0	0	1	27	NC
2022	24H TCE Series Europe – TCR	AC Motorsport	1	0	0	0	0	0	NC
2022	International GT Open	SPS automotive performance	13	0	1	0	0	49	7th
2022	International GT Open – Pro-Am	SPS automotive performance	13	1	1	2	4	57	**3rd**
2022	24 Hours of Nürburgring – SP9 Pro-Am	Schnitzelalm Racing	1	0	0	0	0	—N/a	DNF
2022	British Endurance Championship – Class E	Dragon Sport by Amigo	1	0	0	0	0	87‡	6th‡
2022	FIA Motorsport Games GT Cup	Team Switzerland	1	0	0	0	0	—N/a	5th
2022	FIA Motorsport Games GT Sprint	Team Switzerland	1	0	0	0	0	—N/a	10th
2022–23	Middle East Trophy – TCR	AC Motorsport	1	1	0	0	1	40	NC
2023	Intercontinental GT Challenge	SunEnergy1 Racing	1	0	0	0	1	15	21st
2023	Intercontinental GT Challenge	Car Collection Motorsport	0	0	0	0	0	15	21st
2023	International GT Open	CBRX by SPS	13	0	0	0	0	10	24th
2023	International GT Open – Pro-Am	CBRX by SPS	13	1	0	0	3	42	5th
2023	GT World Challenge Europe Endurance Cup	Theeba Motorsport	1	0	0	0	0	0	NC
2023	GT World Challenge Europe Endurance Cup – Bronze	Theeba Motorsport	1	0	0	0	0	0	NC
2023	24H GT Series – GT3 Pro-Am	Car Collection Motorsport	1	0	0	0	0	40	NC
2024	24H Series – GT3 Pro-Am	Car Collection Motorsport	2	0	0	0	0	56	7th
2024	International GT Open	CBRX by SPS	14	0	0	0	0	0	37th
2024	International GT Open – Pro-Am	CBRX by SPS	14	0	0	0	2	44	7th
2024	GT World Challenge Europe Endurance Cup	GetSpeed	5	0	0	0	0	0	NC
2024	GT World Challenge Europe Endurance Cup – Silver	GetSpeed	5	1	0	0	1	76	5th
2024	Intercontinental GT Challenge	GetSpeed	1	0	0	0	0	3	23rd
2024	Intercontinental GT Challenge	Car Collection Motorsport	1	0	0	0	0	3	23rd
2024	FIA Motorsport Games GT Cup	Team Switzerland	1	0	0	0	1	—N/a	**3rd**
2024–25	Asian Le Mans Series – GT	Car Collection Motorsport	4	0	0	0	0	0	31st
2025	International GT Open	CBRX by SPS	12	0	0	0	0	5	30th
2025	International GT Open – Pro-Am	CBRX by SPS	12	1	1	1	6	57	4th
2025	GT World Challenge Europe Endurance Cup	GetSpeed	5	0	0	0	0	0	NC
2025	GT World Challenge Europe Endurance Cup – Silver	GetSpeed	5	0	0	0	0	22	18th
2025	Intercontinental GT Challenge	GetSpeed	1	0	0	0	0	0	NC
2025	Intercontinental GT Challenge	75 Express	1	0	0	0	0	0	NC
2026	24H Series – 992 Am	SebLajoux Racing	2	0	0	0	0	52	12th
2026	International GT Open	CBRX by SPS	14	0	0	0	0	10	31st
2026	International GT Open – Pro-Am	CBRX by SPS	14	1	4	0	7	64	6th
2026	GT World Challenge Europe Endurance Cup	Team Motopark	1	0	0	0	0	0	NC
2026	GT World Challenge Europe Endurance Cup – Silver	Team Motopark	1	0	0	0	0	9	28th
2026	Intercontinental GT Challenge	Team Motopark	1	0	0	0	0	0	NC

^{†} As Mettler was a guest driver, he was ineligible for points.
^{‡} Team standings.
* Season still in progress.

=== Complete German Formula Three Championship results ===
(key) (Races in bold indicate pole position) (Races in italics indicate fastest lap)

Year	Entrant	Chassis	Engine	1	2	3	4	5	6	7	8	9	10	11	12	13	14	15	16	17	18	19	20	21	22	23	24	25	26	27	DC	Points
2011	Bordoli-Motorsport	Dallara F305	OPC Challenge	OSC; 1; 19	OSC; 2; 9	SPA; 1; 11	SPA; 2; 14	SAC; 1; 11	SAC; 2 DSQ	ASS; 1; 11	ASS; 2; 12	ZOL; 1 Ret	ZOL; 2; 13	RBR; 1	RBR; 2	LAU; 1	LAU; 2	ASS; 1; 12	ASS; 2 Ret	HOC; 1 Ret	HOC; 2; 14										NC	0
2012	Performance Racing	Dallara F308	VW Power Engine	ZAN; 1; 5	ZAN; 2; 1	ZAN; 3 DNS	SAC; 1; 5	SAC; 2; 14	SAC; 3 DSQ	OSC; 1; 7	OSC; 2; 2	OSC; 2; 4	SPA; 1; 6	SPA; 2; 8	SPA; 3; 6	ASS; 1; 10	ASS; 2; 8	ASS; 3; 9	RBR; 1; 9	RBR; 2; 3	RBR; 3; 6	LAU; 1; 7	LAU; 2; 5	LAU; 3; 5	NÜR; 1; 9	NÜR; 2; 14	NÜR; 3; 5	HOC; 1 Ret	HOC; 2 Ret	HOC; 3; 5	8th	131
2013	Performance Racing	Dallara F308	VW Power Engine	OSC1; 1; 4	OSC1; 2; 9	OSC1; 2; 13	SPA; 1; 5	SPA; 2 Ret	SPA; 3; 6	NÜR1; 1; 6	NÜR1; 2 C	NÜR1; 3; 6	SAC; 1	SAC; 2	SAC; 3	LAU1; 1	LAU1; 2	LAU1; 3	NÜR2; 1	NÜR2; 2	NÜR2; 3	LAU2; 1	LAU2; 2	LAU2; 3	OSC2; 1	OSC2; 2	OSC2; 3	HOC; 1	HOC; 2	HOC; 3	11th	46

=== Complete Le Mans Cup results ===
(key) (Races in bold indicate pole position; results in italics indicate fastest lap)

Year	Entrant	Class	Chassis	1	2	3	4	5	6	7	Rank	Points
2019	SPS Automotive Performance	GT3	Mercedes-AMG GT3	LEC; 2	MNZ; Ret	LMS; 1; 7	LMS; 2; 7	BAR; 5	SPA; 4	POR; 3	4th	69

=== Complete International GT Open results ===
(key) (Races in bold indicate pole position) (Races in italics indicate fastest lap)

Year	Team	Car	Class	1	2	3	4	5	6	7	8	9	10	11	12	13	14	Pos.	Points
2020	Lazarus Racing	Bentley Continental GT3	Pro	HUN; 1; 4	HUN; 2; 7													4th	80
2020	Team Lazarus	Bentley Continental GT3	Pro			LEC; 1 Ret	LEC; 2; 4	RBR; 1	RBR; 2	**MNZ**; **1**; 1	MNZ; 2; 5	**SPA**; **1**; 2	SPA; 2; 3	CAT; 1; 7	CAT; 2; 2			4th	80
2022	SPS Automotive Performance	Mercedes-AMG GT3 Evo	Pro-Am	EST; 1; 5	EST; 2; 3	LEC; 1; 3	LEC; 2; 9	SPA; 4	HUN; 1; 4	HUN; 2; 7	RBR; 1; 3	RBR; 2; 8	MNZ; 1; 4	MNZ; 2; 1	CAT; 1; 6	CAT; 2; 4		3rd	57
2023	CBRX by SPS	Mercedes-AMG GT3 Evo	Pro-Am	ALG; 1; 1	ALG; 2; 6	SPA; 12	HUN; 1; 7	HUN; 2; 3	LEC; 1; 5	LEC; 2; 2	RBR; 1; 6	RBR; 2; 4	MNZ; 1; 9	MNZ; 2; 5	CAT; 1 Ret	CAT; 2; 4		6th	38
2024	CBRX by SPS	Mercedes-AMG GT3 Evo	Pro-Am	ALG; 1; 4	ALG; 2; 4	HOC; 1; 12	HOC; 2; 8	SPA; 11	HUN; 1; 9	HUN; 2; 8	LEC; 1; 7	LEC; 2; 3	RBR; 1; 9	RBR; 2; 3	CAT; 1; 6	CAT; 2; 4	MNZ; 4	7th	44
2025	CBRX by SPS	Mercedes-AMG GT3 Evo	Pro-Am	**ALG**; **1**; 6	ALG; 2; 3	SPA; WD	HOC; 1; 3	HOC; 2; 2	HUN; 1; 2	HUN; 2; 10	LEC; 1; 4	LEC; 2; 3	RBR; 1 Ret	RBR; 2; 10	**CAT**; **1**; 1	CAT; 2; 4	MNZ	4th	57
2026	CBRX by SPS	Mercedes-AMG GT3 Evo	Pro-Am	ALG; 1; 2	**ALG**; **2**; 3	**SPA**; Ret	MIS; 1 Ret	**MIS**; **2** Ret	HUN; 1; 3	HUN; 2; 2	LEC; 1 Ret	LEC; 2; 3	HOC; 1; 1	HOC; 2 Ret	MNZ; 2	**CAT**; **1**; 11	CAT; 2; 5	6th	64

=== Complete GT World Challenge results ===
==== GT World Challenge Europe Endurance Cup ====
(Races in bold indicate pole position) (Races in italics indicate fastest lap)

Year	Team	Car	Class	1	2	3	4	5	6	7	Pos.	Points
2021	SPS Automotive Performance	Mercedes-AMG GT3 Evo	Silver	MNZ; 18	LEC; Ret	SPA; 6H; 36	SPA; 12H; 27	SPA; 24H; 21	NÜR; 19	CAT; 22	18th	27
2023	Theeba Motorsport	Mercedes-AMG GT3 Evo	Bronze	MNZ	LEC	SPA; 6H; 52	SPA; 12H; 60†	SPA; 24H; Ret	NÜR	CAT	NC	0
2024	GetSpeed	Mercedes-AMG GT3 Evo	Silver	LEC; 39	SPA; 6H; 33	SPA; 12H; 14	SPA; 24H; 25	NÜR; 41	MNZ; 35	JED; 30	5th	76
2025	GetSpeed	Mercedes-AMG GT3 Evo	Silver	LEC; 43	MNZ; 18	SPA; 6H; 64†	SPA; 12H; 66†	SPA; 24H; Ret	NÜR; 27	BAR; 27	18th	22
2026	Team Motopark	Mercedes-AMG GT3 Evo	Silver	LEC	MNZ	SPA; 6H; 44	SPA; 12H; 36	SPA; 24H; 23	NÜR	ALG	28th	9

=== Complete Asian Le Mans Series results ===
(key) (Races in bold indicate pole position) (Races in italics indicate fastest lap)

Year	Team	Class	Car	Engine	1	2	3	4	5	6	Pos.	Points
2024–25	Car Collection Motorsport	GT	Porsche 911 GT3 R (992)	Porsche 4.0 L Flat-6	SEP; 1; 17	SEP; 2; 22	DUB; 1 WD	DUB; 2 WD	ABU; 1; 16	ABU; 2; 20	31st	0
