= Theeba Motorsport =

Saudi Arabian auto racing team

(Saudi Arabia) Theeba Motorsport
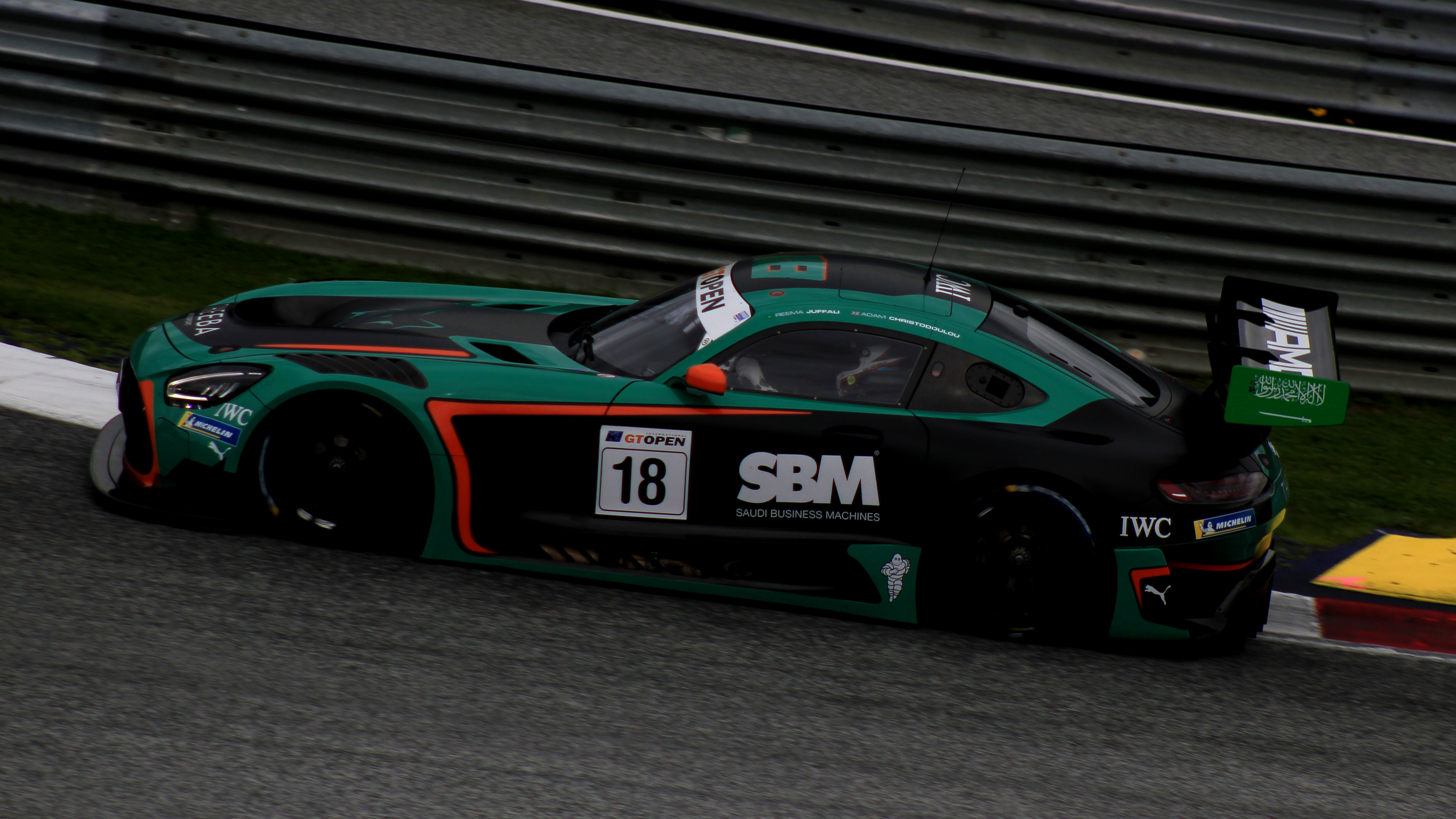
- Founded: 2022
- Founder(s): (Saudi Arabia) Reema Juffali
- Current series: GT World Challenge Europe
- Former series: International GT Open
- Current drivers: (Saudi Arabia) Reema Juffali (Germany) Fabian Schiller (Estonia) Ralf Aron (Switzerland) Alain Valente (Switzerland) Yannick Mettler
- Website: www.theebamotorsport.com

Theeba Motorsport is a Saudi Arabian motor racing team founded by the Kingdom's first female professional racing driver, Reema Juffali. The team competes in the GT World Challenge Europe sportscar series using the Mercedes-AMG GT3 EVO.

== History ==
=== Foundation ===
Theeba Motorsport was founded by Reema Juffali in 2022 to facilitate Saudi Arabian access to and participation in motorsport through a series of engineering, mechanical and commercial internship and apprenticeship programmes.

The team aspires to one day compete at the prestigious Le Mans 24 Hours endurance race under a Saudi Arabian racing licence.

=== International GT Open ===
==== 2022 season ====
Theeba Motorsport joined the International GT Open Pro-Am grid for the 2022 season with Juffali and Nürburgring 24 Hours winner Adam Christodoulou forming the team's driver lineup.

Racing a Mercedes-AMG GT3 EVO, the team tasted victory on debut by securing back-to-back class victories at the Circuito do Estoril in Portugal. With this result, Juffali became the first Saudi woman to win an international motor race. The team scored its first pole position one weekend later at the Circuit Paul Ricard and secured its third class victory at the French venue.

After retiring from races at the Circuit de Spa-Francorchamps and Hungaroring, the team bounced back at the Red Bull Ring to score its fourth Pro-Am victory of the season.

In the final race at the Red Bull Ring, Juffali was involved in a weekend-ending accident after being rear-ended by Dominik Schraml. As a result, the team was forced to withdraw from the penultimate weekend of the season at Monza due to ongoing repair work. Juffali and Christodoulou returned for the 2022 finale at the Circuit de Barcelona-Catalunya and secured back-to-back class podiums by finishing third in Races One and Two.

Despite missing three races in the 13-race campaign, Theeba Motorsport finished as the runners-up in the Pro-Am Championship with 57 points and finished sixth overall with 51 points.

=== GT World Challenge Europe ===
==== 2023 season ====
For 2023, Theeba Motorsport joined the GT World Challenge Europe Bronze Cup grid, to compete in the series' Sprint and Endurance Cups. In March 2023, it was confirmed that 2015 Italian F4 champion, Ralf Aron, and Switzerland's Alain Valente would join Juffali to form the team's driver lineup. Yannick Mettler later joined the team for the 24 Hours of Spa, while Fabian Schiller filled in for Aron at the Misano, Hockenheim, and Valencia Sprint Cup rounds.

With Juffali at the wheel, the team secured its first series pole position at Hockenheim. On the following weekend at the Circuit Ricardo Tormo, the team secured its first Sprint Cup podium, with Juffali and Schiller finishing second in class.

Theeba Motorsport finished seventh in the Sprint Cup's Bronze category with 30.5 points and was classified 30th in the Bronze Endurance Cup.

== Results ==
=== International GT Open ===
(key) (Races in bold indicate pole position) (^{Superscript} indicates overall position) (* indicates season still in progress.)

Year	Car	Class	Drivers	1	2	3	4	5	6	7	8	9	10	11	12	13	Pos.	Points
2022	Mercedes-AMG GT3 Evo	**Pro-Am**	(Saudi Arabia) Reema Juffali (United Kingdom) Adam Christodoulou	EST		LEC		SPA	HUN		RBR		MNZ		CAT		2nd	57
2022	Mercedes-AMG GT3 Evo	**Pro-Am**	(Saudi Arabia) Reema Juffali (United Kingdom) Adam Christodoulou	1^{4}	1^{3}	**5^{7}**	1^{3}	Ret	Ret	DNS	1^{3}	Ret	WD	WD	3^{8}	3^{11}	2nd	57

=== GT World Challenge Sprint Cup ===
(key) (Races in bold indicate pole position) (^{Superscript} indicates overall position) (* indicates season still in progress.)

=== GT World Challenge Endurance Cup ===
(key) (Races in bold indicate pole position) (^{Superscript} indicates overall position) (* indicates season still in progress.)

Year	Car	Class	Drivers	1	2	3	4	5	6	7	Pos.	Points
2023	Mercedes-AMG GT3 Evo	**Bronze Cup**	(Saudi Arabia) Reema Juffali (Estonia) Ralf Aron (Switzerland) Alain Valente (Switzerland) Yannick Mettler	MNZ	LEC	SPA			NUR	BAR	7th	30.5
2023	Mercedes-AMG GT3 Evo	**Bronze Cup**	(Saudi Arabia) Reema Juffali (Estonia) Ralf Aron (Switzerland) Alain Valente (Switzerland) Yannick Mettler	15^{38}	5^{27}	14^{52}	19^{50}	Ret	7^{29}	11^{36}	7th	30.5
