= Simon Reicher =

Austrian racing driver (born 2000)

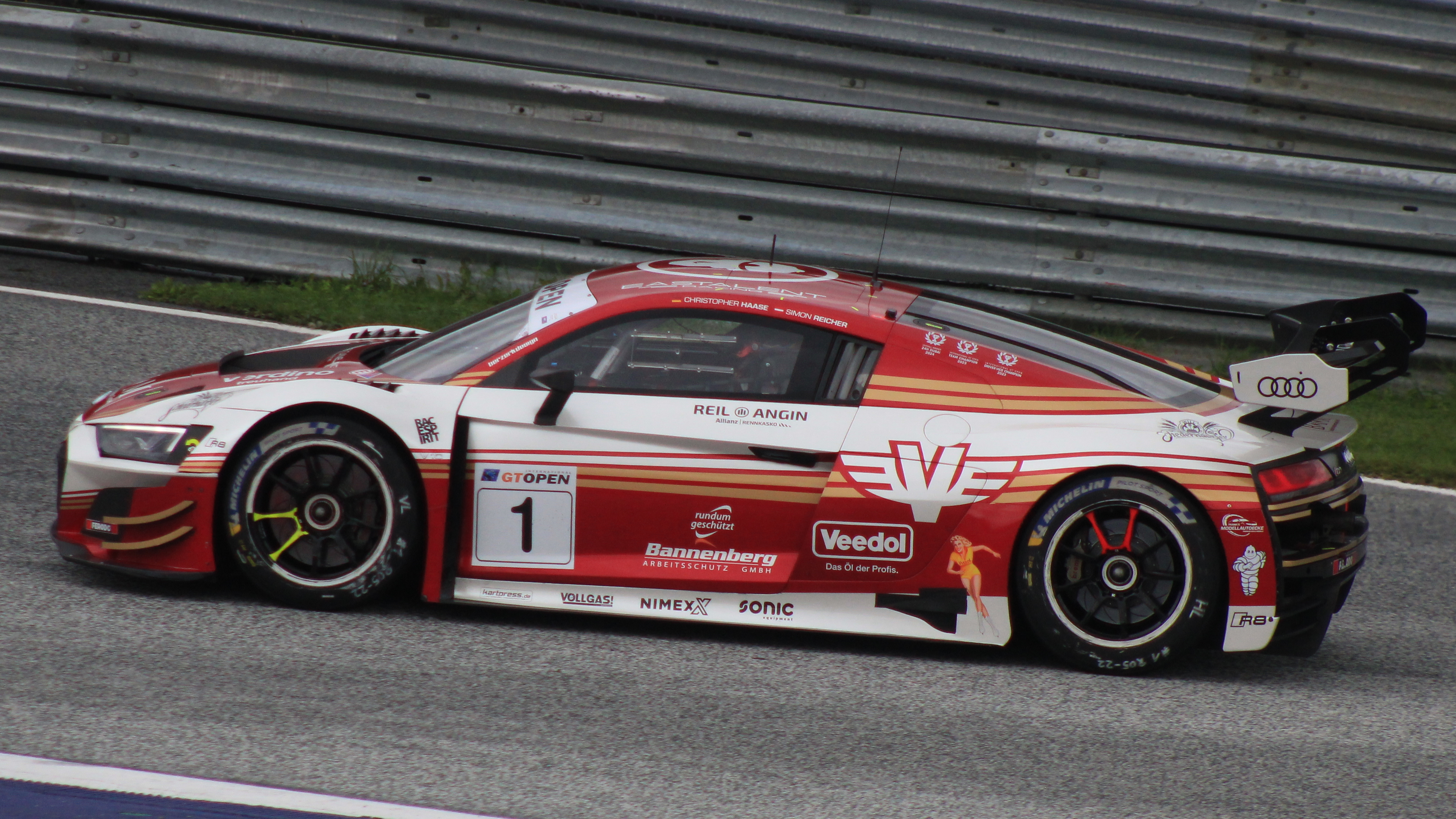
- Nationality: (Austria) Austrian
- Born: 8 February 2000 (age 26) Kirchberg bei Mattighofen, Austria

International GT Open career
- Debut season: 2024
- Current team: Eastalent Racing
- Categorisation: FIA Silver
- Starts: 41 (41 entries)
- Wins: 6
- Podiums: 21
- Poles: 4
- Fastest laps: 3
- Best finish: 1st in 2024

Simon Reicher (born 8 February 2000) is an Austrian racing driver who last competed in International GT Open for Eastalent Racing. Reicher is the 2024 International GT Open champion.

== Career ==
=== Early career ===
Reicher began karting at the age of eight and won the 43rd Trofeo Della Industrie in 2015. With Certainty Racing Team he made his car racing debut in the 2016 Renault Clio Cup Central Europe. After 2016, he remained with Certainty Racing Team but switched to TCR, where he contested the 2017 ADAC TCR Germany Touring Car Championship, his highest finish of the season was tenth and he ended the championship in twenty-eighth.

Reicher also did cameos in the TCR BeNeLux Touring Car Championship and the TCR Italy Touring Car Championship, where he got his maiden podium in TCE BeNeLux and came fourth in both races in TCR Italy.

For the 2018 season, Reicher switched to YACO Racing, taking a finish of fourth place in his debut race at Motorsport Arena Oschersleben with the team. He also came fourth again in the first race of the second round at Autodrom Most, these were his best performances of his campaign but he finished in the top ten multiple times and ended the season in tenth.

=== Switch to GT3 competition (2019–present) ===
Reicher competed in the first two rounds of the 2019 ADAC GT Masters for T3 Motorsport with Maximilian Paul, but after retiring from the two races he contested in, he ended the partnership with the team. He won the DMV Gran Turismo TCC Class 1 title with YACO Racing Team, where he also won his first two motor races. In 2020, he competed in the 2020 24 Hours of Nürburgring for IronForce Racing where he came fourth in the SP9 Pro/Am class. He was supposed to compete in ADAC GT Masters for YACO Racing with Norbert Siedler, but only contested the Red Bull Ring with the team.

Reicher renewed his partnership with YACO Racing and Norbert Siedler for the 2021 ADAC GT Masters, but had a difficult season as the duo got their best result of eleventh place twice and ended their campaign a round early, finishing the championship thirty-seventh in the standings. Reicher also participated in the second round of the 2021 GT World Challenge Europe Endurance Cup for Car Collection Motorsport.

Reicher and Siedler continued in the ADAC GT Masters for 2022 with newly founded Austrian team Eastalent Racing, which is owned by his father, Peter Reicher. This was the first season where Reicher competed in the championship full-time and achieved his first ever podium in the series with a third place at Circuit Zandvoort. During the season, he also contested the 2022 24 Hours of Nürburgring in the SP9 Pro/Am class with Lionspeed by Car Collection Motorsport, where he came fourth in his class.

With Eastalent Racing, Reicher switched to the 2023 International GT Open, being partnered up with Christopher Haase. The duo were quickly successful in the series, getting a podium on their debut weekend at the second race of the Algarve International Circuit. Reicher got his first ever pole position in the series which he converted to a second place at the Circuit de Spa-Francorchamps. The duo then won in the series' penultimate round at the Circuit de Barcelona-Catalunya. They fought for the title and were originally crowned the champions until they were stripped of their title in January 2024 and demoted to runner-ups of the series.

In January 2024, Reicher won the 2024 Dubai 24 Hour with Gilles Magnus, Markus Winkelhock, Christopher Haase and Mike Zhou with Eastalent Racing Team. Reicher then returned to Eastalent Racing for the rest of the year, as he remained in International GT Open alongside Haase. Starting off the season with wins at the Hockenheimring and Hungaroring, the pair then scored further wins at Le Castellet and Red Bull Ring, as well as taking three other podiums to secure their maiden International GT Open title at Monza. During 2024, Reicher also raced for the same team in select rounds of the GT World Challenge Europe Endurance and Sprint Cups. For his title defence the following year, Reicher remained with Eastalent alongside Haase, scoring a lone win at the Hungaroring and six other podiums to end the year third in points.

== Karting record ==
=== Karting career summary ===
Season	Series	Team	Position
2010	WSK Super Master Series – Mini Kart	Reicher Peter	38th
2010	WSK Nations Cup – 60 Mini	Reicher Peter	21st
2010	40° Trofeo delle Industrie – 60 Mini	Reicher Peter	31st
2011	WSK Super Master Series – 60 Mini	Reicher Peter	17th
2011	Andrea Margutti Trophy – 60 Mini	Reicher Peter	31st
2011	WSK Final Cup – 60 Mini	Reicher Peter	19th
2011	Italian Karting Championship – 60 Mini		82nd
2012	Andrea Margutti Trophy – 60 Mini	Peter Reicher	18th
2012	WSK Super Master Series – 60 Mini	Peter Reicher	25th
2012	Italian Karting Championship – 60 Mini	HIMRACINGKART	35th
2013	Andrea Margutti Trophy – KF Junior		
2013	German Kart Championship – KF Junior	Gamoto Racing	24th
2013	CIK-FIA European Championship - KF Junior	RK Racing Team	80th
2013	Italian Karting Championship – KF Junior	SR Karting	75th
2013	WSK Final Cup – KF Junior	Peter Reicher	
2013	42° Trofeo delle Industrie – KF3		11th
2014	19° South Garda Winter Cup – KF Junior	RS-Karting Peter Reicher	29th
2014	WSK Super Master Series – KF Junior	MM Racing	77th
2014	Andrea Margutti Trophy – KF Junior	MM Racing	26th
2014	CIK-FIA European Championship – KF Junior	MM Racing	
2014	CIK-FIA World Championship – KF Junior	MM Racing	
2014	German Kart Championship – KF Junior		23rd
2014	43° Trofeo delle Industrie – KF Junior		1st
2015	20° South Garda Winter Cup – KF	MM Kart Racing	33rd
2015	Andrea Margutti Trophy – KF	MM Kart Racing	22nd
2015	CIK-FIA European Championship – KF	MM Kart Racing	48th

== Racing record ==
=== Racing career summary ===
Season	Series	Team	Races	Wins	Poles	F/Laps	Podiums	Points	Position
2016	Renault Clio Cup Central Europe	Certainty Racing Team	12	0	0	0	0	111	11th
2016	Renault Clio Cup Benelux - Clio IV	Certainty Racing Team	3	0	0	0	0	0	NC
2017	ADAC TCR Germany Touring Car Championship	Certainty Racing Team	12	0	0	0	0	28	28th
2017	TCR BeNeLux Touring Car Championship	Certainty Racing Team	3	0	0	0	1	67	19th
2017	TCR Italy Touring Car Championship	Simon Reicher Motorsport Activities	2	0	0	0	0	16	16th
2018	ADAC TCR Germany Touring Car Championship	YACO Racing	14	0	0	0	0	182	10th
2018	DMV Gran Turismo TCC - Class 1	YACO Racing	2	0	0	0	1	0	NC
2019	24H Series - Continents	Car Collection Motorsport	2	0	0	0	0	0	NC
2019	24H Series - Europe - A6	Car Collection Motorsport	3	0	0	0	0	0	NC
2019	ADAC GT Masters	T3 Motorsport	4	0	0	0	0	0	NC
2019	DMV Gran Turismo TCC - Class 1	YACO Racing Team	12	2	4	1	10	109.57	1st
2019	DMV Dunlop 60 - Class 1	Yaco Racing	6	1	0	0	6	61.05	2nd
2019	VLN Series - V4	Manheller Racing	2	0	0	0	0	11.8	56th
2020	Nürburgring Langstrecken-Serie - SP9 Pro/Am	EFP Car Collection by TECE	2	0	0	0	1	6.25	9th
2020	Nürburgring Langstrecken-Serie - SP9 Am	EFP Car Collection by TECE	1	0	0	0	1	7	19th
2020	24 Hours of Nürburgring - SP9 Pro/Am	IronForce Racing	1	0	0	0	0	N/A	4th
2020	ADAC GT Masters	YACO Racing	2	0	0	0	0	0	NC†
2021	ADAC GT Masters	YACO Racing	11	0	0	0	0	12	37th
2021	GT World Challenge Europe Endurance Cup	Car Collection Motorsport	1	0	0	0	0	0	NC
2021	GT World Challenge Europe Endurance Cup - Silver	Car Collection Motorsport	1	0	0	0	0	1	50th
2022	ADAC GT Masters	Eastalent Racing Team	14	0	0	0	1	47	25th
2022	24 Hours of Nürburgring - SP9 Pro/Am	Lionspeed by Car Collection Motorsport	1	0	0	0	0	N/A	4th
2023	International GT Open	Eastalent Racing	13	1	2	1	7	119	2nd
2023–24	Middle East Trophy - GT3	Eastalent Racing Team	1	1	0	0	1	40	NC
2024	International GT Open	Eastalent Racing	14	4	0	1	7	124	1st
2024	GT World Challenge Europe Endurance Cup	Eastalent Racing	1	0	0	0	0	0	NC
2024	GT World Challenge Europe Sprint Cup	Eastalent Racing	4	0	0	0	0	1.5	20th
2024	GT World Challenge Europe Sprint Cup - Silver	Eastalent Racing	2	0	1	0	1	10.5	16th
2025	International GT Open	Eastalent Racing Team	14	1	2	1	7	134	**3rd**
2025	Nürburgring Langstrecken-Serie - SP9 Pro	Eastalent Racing Team	2	0	0	0	0	3	NC
2025	24 Hours of Nürburgring - SP9 Pro	Eastalent Racing Team	1	0	0	0	0	N/A	5th
2026	GT World Challenge Europe Endurance Cup	Eastalent Racing	5	0	0	0	0	12	22nd
2026	GT World Challenge Europe Sprint Cup	Eastalent Racing	10	0	0	0	0	8	24th

=== Complete ADAC TCR Germany Touring Car Championship results ===
(key) (Races in bold indicate pole position) (Races in italics indicate fastest lap)

Year	Team	Car	1	2	3	4	5	6	7	8	9	10	11	12	13	14	DC	Points
2017	Certainty Racing Team	Audi RS3 LMS TCR	OSC; 1 Ret	OSC; 2; 19	RBR; 1; 14	RBR; 2; 22	OSC; 1; 24	OSC; 2; 28	ZAN; 1; 10	ZAN; 2; 22	NÜR; 1; 26	NÜR; 2; 20	SAC; 1	SAC; 2	HOC; 1; 26	HOC; 2; 29	28th	28
2018	YACO Racing	Audi RS3 LMS TCR	OSC; 1; 4	OSC; 2 Ret	MST; 1; 4^{4}	MST; 2; 17	RBR; 1; 10	RBR; 2; 11	NÜR; 1; 10	NÜR; 2; 19	ZAN; 1; 6	ZAN; 2; 7	SAC; 1; 12	SAC; 2; 11	HOC; 1 Ret	HOC; 2; 15	10th	182

=== Complete ADAC GT Masters results ===
(key) (Races in bold indicate pole position) (Races in italics indicate fastest lap)

Year	Team	Car	1	2	3	4	5	6	7	8	9	10	11	12	13	14	DC	Points
2019	T3 Motorsport	Audi R8 LMS Evo	OSC; 1; 23	OSC; 2 Ret	MST; 1; 25	MST; 2 Ret	RBR; 1	RBR; 2	ZAN; 1	ZAN; 2	NÜR; 1	NÜR; 2	HOC; 1	HOC; 2	SAC; 1	SAC; 2	NC	0
2020	YACO Racing	Audi R8 LMS Evo	LAU1; 1	LAU1; 2	NÜR; 1	NÜR; 2	HOC; 1	HOC; 2	SAC; 1	SAC; 2	RBR; 1; 24	RBR; 2 Ret	LAU2; 1	LAU2; 2	OSC; 1	OSC; 2	NC†	0
2021	YACO Racing	Audi R8 LMS Evo	OSC; 1; 22	OSC; 2; 11	RBR; 1 Ret	RBR; 2; 16	ZAN; 1; 21	ZAN; 2; 11	LAU; 1 Ret	LAU; 2; 22	SAC; 1; 23	SAC; 2; 18	HOC; 1; 15	HOC; 2; 15	NÜR; 1	NÜR; 2	37th	12
2022	Eastalent Racing Team	Audi R8 LMS Evo II	OSC; 1; 15	OSC; 2; 10	RBR; 1; 14	RBR; 2; 19	ZAN; 1; 3	ZAN; 2; 10	NÜR; 1; 17	NÜR; 2; 15	LAU; 1; 14	LAU; 2; 12	SAC; 1; 18	SAC; 2; 13	HOC; 1; 15	HOC; 2; 14	25th	47

† As Reicher was a guest driver, he was ineligible for points.

=== Complete 24 Hours of Nürburgring results ===
Year	Team	Co-drivers	Car	Class	Laps	Pos.	Class pos.
2020	(Germany) IronForce Racing	(Germany) Elia Erhart (Germany) Pierre Kaffer (Germany) Jan-Erik Slooten	Audi R8 LMS Evo	SP9 Pro-Am	79	18th	4th
2022	(Germany) Lionspeed by Car Collection Motorsport	(Germany) Dennis Fetzer (Germany) Klaus Koch (Germany) Dennis Marschall	Audi R8 LMS Evo II	SP9 Pro-Am	154	13th	4th
2025	(Austria) Eastalent Racing Team	(Austria) Max Hofer (Austria) Christian Klien (Austria) Norbert Siedler	Audi R8 LMS Evo II	SP9 Pro	137	6th	5th

=== Complete GT World Challenge Europe results ===
==== GT World Challenge Europe Endurance Cup ====
(key) (Races in bold indicate pole position; results in italics indicate fastest lap)

Year	Team	Car	Class	1	2	3	4	5	6	7	Pos.	Points
2021	Car Collection Motorsport	Audi R8 LMS Evo	Silver	MNZ	LEC; 33	SPA; 6H	SPA; 12H	SPA; 24H	NÜR	CAT	50th	1
2024	Eastalent Racing	Audi R8 LMS Evo II	Pro	LEC	SPA; 6H	SPA; 12H	SPA; 24H	NÜR; 26	MNZ	JED	NC	0
2026	Eastalent Racing	Audi R8 LMS Evo II	Pro	LEC; 15	MNZ; 20	SPA; 6H; 1	SPA; 12H; 51	SPA; 24H; Ret	NÜR; Ret	ALG; Ret	22nd	12

==== Complete GT World Challenge Europe Sprint Cup results ====
(key) (Races in bold indicate pole position; results in italics indicate fastest lap)

Year	Team	Car	Class	1	2	3	4	5	6	7	8	9	10	Pos.	Points
2024	Eastalent Racing	Audi R8 LMS Evo II	Pro	BRH; 1	BRH; 2	MIS; 1	MIS; 2	HOC; 1	HOC; 2	MAG; 1; 10	MAG; 2; 9			20th	1.5
2024	Eastalent Racing	Audi R8 LMS Evo II	Silver									CAT; 1; 13	**CAT**; **2**; 15	16th	10.5
2026	Eastalent Racing	Audi R8 LMS Evo II	Pro	BRH; 1; 23	BRH; 2; 17	MIS; 1; 8	MIS; 2; 35	MAG; 1 Ret	MAG; 2; 5	ZAN; 1; 21	ZAN; 2 Ret	CAT; 1; 14	CAT; 2; 14	24th	8

=== Complete International GT Open results ===
(key) (Races in bold indicate pole position) (Races in italics indicate fastest lap)

Year	Team	Car	Class	1	2	3	4	5	6	7	8	9	10	11	12	13	14	Pos.	Points
2023	Eastalent Racing	Audi R8 LMS Evo II	Pro	ALG; 1; 4	ALG; 2; 3	**SPA**; 2	HUN; 1; 2	**HUN**; **2** Ret	LEC; 1 Ret	LEC; 2; 2	RBR; 1; 5	RBR; 2; 3	MNZ; 1; 2	MNZ; 2; 6	CAT; 1; 1	CAT; 2; 6		2nd	119
2024	Eastalent Racing	Audi R8 LMS Evo II	Pro	ALG; 1; 10	ALG; 2; 4	HOC; 1 Ret	**HOC**; **2**; 1	SPA; 8	HUN; 1; 1	HUN; 2; 28†	LEC; 1; 1	LEC; 2; 2	RBR; 1; 9	RBR; 2; 1	CAT; 1; 10	CAT; 2; 3	MNZ; 2	1st	124
2025	Eastalent Racing	Audi R8 LMS Evo II	Pro	ALG; 1; 2	ALG; 2; 5	SPA; 2	HOC; 1; 2	HOC; 2; 2	HUN; 1; 5	**HUN**; **2**; 1	LEC; 1; 26†	LEC; 2; 6	RBR; 1; 3	RBR; 2; 18	CAT; 1; 2	**CAT**; **2**; 7	MNZ; 4	3rd	134
