= Eastalent Racing =

Austrian racing team

(Austria) Eastalent Racing
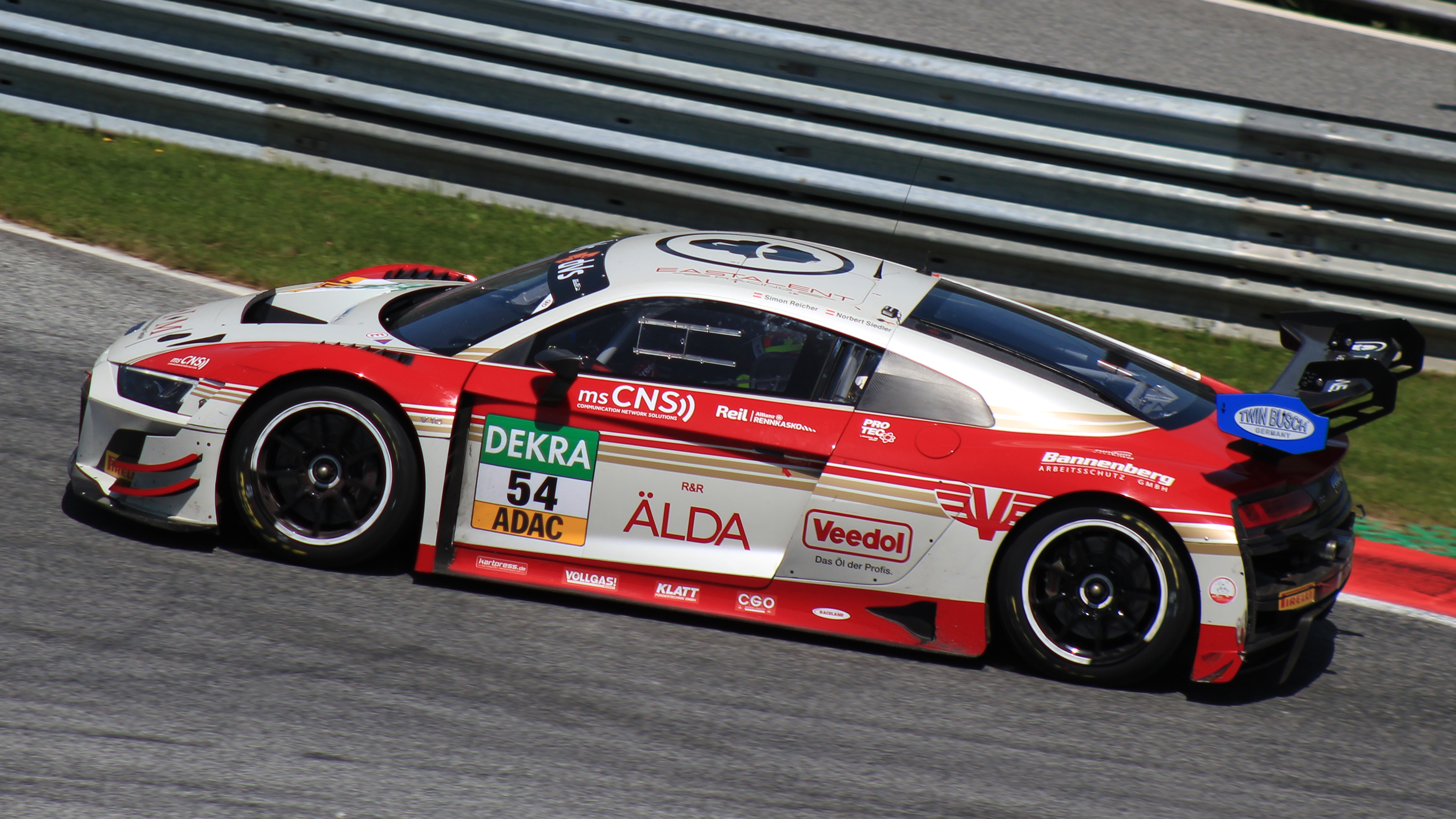
- Founded: 2021
- Base: Kirchberg bei Mattighofen, Austria
- Founder(s): Peter Reicher
- Current series: GT World Challenge Europe Endurance Cup; GT World Challenge Europe Sprint Cup
- Former series: ADAC GT Masters; International GT Open; Middle East Trophy; Nürburgring Langstrecken-Serie
- Current drivers: (Germany) Christopher Haase (Austria) Simon Reicher (Germany) Markus Winkelhock
- Teams' Championships: 2023 GT Open Overall
- Drivers' Championships: 2024 GT Open Overall
- Website: Official Website

Eastalent Racing is an Austrian racing team founded in 2021 by Peter Reicher. The team currently competes in the International GT Open.

== History ==
Eastalent Racing Team was founded in December 2021 by Peter Reicher. Just four months later, announced that they would enter in the 2022 ADAC GT Masters season with an Audi R8 LMS Evo II. Drivers for their debut season were Peter's son, Simon Reicher and Norbert Siedler, who finished 25th overall with a podium finish at the first race in Zandvoort.

In 2023, Eastalent entered into the International GT Open with drivers Christopher Haase and Simon Reicher. At the second race at Portimão, the team finished third, securing their first podium in the series. Eastalent won their first race at Barcelona, which was enough for them to claim the drivers' and teams' titles. However, following an appeal by Optimum Motorsport, the results of race 2 at the Red Bull Ring were reinstated. This resulted in a tie with Optimum duo, Charlie Fagg and Samuel De Haan who took the drivers' title by winning more races than Haase and Reicher.

To start the 2024 season, Eastalent entered into the 2024 Dubai 24 Hour with Christopher Haase, Gilles Magnus, Simon Reicher, Markus Winkelhock and Mike Zhou in an Audi R8 LMS GT3 Evo II. After qualifying sixth, the team managed to take overall victory, the first time an Austrian team had done so since Duller Motorsport in 2007.

Eastalent entered the 2024 International GT Open season as the defending champions and retained the same driver lineup of Haase and Reicher. The pair won four races en route to securing the overall drivers' championship at Monza.

In addition to their GT Open commitment, Eastalent also entered into the GT World Challenge Europe Endurance Cup and Sprint Cup. Karol Basz, Albert Costa and Reicher finished 26th at the Endurance Cup round at the Nürburgring. Haase and Reicher finished in tenth and ninth overall at Magny-Cours. Reicher was joined by Basz for the following round at Barcelona, where they started on pole and finished third in the silver class in the second race.

In 2025, Eastalent again entered the International GT Open with Haase and Reicher but did not claim any titles, finishing third with one win at the Hungaroring and seven podiums. The team also raced at the 24 Hours of Nürburgring in the SP 9 Pro class in an Audi R8 LMS Evo II with drivers Christian Klien, Max Hofer, Reicher and Norbert Siedler. After qualifying 16th overall, they managed to finish fifth in class and sixth overall.

== Racing record ==
=== Complete ADAC GT Masters results ===
(key) (Races in bold indicate pole position) (Races in italics indicate fastest lap)

Year	Entrant	No.	Chassis	Drivers	1	2	3	4	5	6	7	8	9	10	11	12	13	14	DC	Points
2022	Eastalent Racing Team	54	Audi R8 LMS Evo II	(Austria) Simon Reicher (Austria) Norbert Siedler	OSC; 1; 15	OSC; 2; 10	RBR; 1; 14	RBR; 2; 19	ZAN; 1; 3	ZAN; 2; 10	NÜR; 1; 17	NÜR; 2; 15	LAU; 1; 14	LAU; 2; 12	SAC; 1; 18	SAC; 2; 13	HOC; 1; 15	HOC; 2; 14	12th	89

=== Complete International GT Open results ===
(key) (Races in bold indicate pole position) (Races in italics indicate fastest lap)

Year	Team	Class	No.	Car	Drivers	1	2	3	4	5	6	7	8	9	10	11	12	13	14	Pos.	Points
2023	Eastalent Racing	Pro	23	Audi R8 LMS Evo II	(Germany) Christopher Haase (Austria) Simon Reicher	ALG; 1; 4	ALG; 2; 3	**SPA**; 2	HUN; 1; 2	**HUN**; **2** Ret	LEC; 1 Ret	LEC; 2; 2	RBR; 1; 5	RBR; 2; 3	MNZ; 1; 2	MNZ; 2; 6	CAT; 1; 1	CAT; 2; 6		1st	73
2024	Eastalent Racing Team	Pro	1	Audi R8 LMS Evo II	(Germany) Christopher Haase (Austria) Simon Reicher	ALG; 1; 10	ALG; 2; 4	HOC; 1 Ret	**HOC**; **2**; 1	SPA; 8	HUN; 1; 1	HUN; 2; 28†	LEC; 1; 1	LEC; 2; 2	RBR; 1; 9	RBR; 2; 1	CAT; 1; 10	CAT; 2; 3	MNZ; 2	4th	74
2025	Eastalent Racing Team	Pro	1	Audi R8 LMS Evo II	(Germany) Christopher Haase (Austria) Simon Reicher	ALG; 1; 2	ALG; 2; 5	SPA; 2	HOC; 1; 2	HOC; 2; 2	HUN; 1; 5	**HUN**; **2**; 1	LEC; 1; 26†	LEC; 2; 6	RBR; 1; 3	RBR; 2; 18	CAT; 1; 2	**CAT**; **2**; 7	MNZ; 2	3rd	80

=== GT World Challenge Europe ===
==== GT World Challenge Europe Sprint Cup ====
(key) (Races in bold indicate pole position; races in italics indicate fastest lap)

Year	Entrant	Class	No	Chassis	Drivers	1	2	3	4	5	6	7	8	9	10	Pos.	Pts
2024	(Austria) Eastalent Racing	Bronze	84	Audi R8 LMS Evo II	(Germany) Christopher Haase (Austria) Simon Reicher	BRH; 1	BRH; 2	MIS; 1	MIS; 2	HOC; 1	HOC; 2	MAG; 1; 10	MAG; 2; 9			20th	1.5
2024	(Austria) Eastalent Racing	Silver	84	Audi R8 LMS Evo II	(Poland) Karol Basz (Austria) Simon Reicher									CAT; 1; 13	**CAT**; **2**; 15	16th	10.5

==== GT World Challenge Europe Endurance Cup ====
(key) (Races in bold indicate pole position; races in italics indicate fastest lap)

Year	Entrant	Class	No	Chassis	Drivers	1	2	3	4	5	6	7	Pos.	Pts
2024	(Austria) Eastalent Racing	Pro	84	Audi R8 LMS Evo II	(Poland) Karol Basz (Spain) Albert Costa (Austria) Simon Reicher	LEC	SPA; 6H	SPA; 12H	SPA; 24H	NÜR; 26	MNZ	JED	NC	0
