= 2023 International GT Open =

Car racing competition

The 2023 International GT Open was the eighteenth season of the International GT Open, the grand tourer-style sports car racing series founded in 2006 by the Spanish GT Sport Organización. It began on 29 April at the Algarve International Circuit and ended at the Circuit de Barcelona-Catalunya on 22 October after seven rounds of two races each.

== Entry list ==
Team	Car	No.	Drivers	Class	Rounds
(Belgium) Street-Art Racing	Aston Martin Vantage AMR GT3	007	(Switzerland) Pascal Bachmann	Am	All
(Belgium) Street-Art Racing	Aston Martin Vantage AMR GT3	007	(France) Jahid Fazal-Karim	Am	1, 4–7
(Belgium) Street-Art Racing	Aston Martin Vantage AMR GT3	007	(South Africa) Xolile Letlaka	Am	2–3
(Poland) Olimp Racing	Ferrari 488 GT3 Evo 2020 1–5; Ferrari 296 GT3 6-7	5	(Poland) Stanislaw Jedliński	Am	All
(Poland) Olimp Racing	Ferrari 488 GT3 Evo 2020 1–5; Ferrari 296 GT3 6-7	5	(Poland) Krystian Korzeniowski	Am	All
(Poland) Olimp Racing	Mercedes-AMG GT3 Evo 1–2; Audi R8 LMS Evo 3–7	777	(Poland) Karol Basz	PA	All
(Poland) Olimp Racing	Mercedes-AMG GT3 Evo 1–2; Audi R8 LMS Evo 3–7	777	(Poland) Marcin Jedliński	PA	All
(Germany) GetSpeed	Mercedes-AMG GT3 Evo	6	(Australia) Andrés Latorre Canon	PA	4
(Germany) GetSpeed	Mercedes-AMG GT3 Evo	6	(United Kingdom) Aaron Walker	PA	4
(Germany) GetSpeed	Mercedes-AMG GT3 Evo	6	(United Kingdom) Aaron Walker	P	5–7
(Germany) GetSpeed	Mercedes-AMG GT3 Evo	6	(United States) Anthony Bartone	P	5, 7
(Germany) GetSpeed	Mercedes-AMG GT3 Evo	6	(United Kingdom) James Wallis	P	6
(Germany) GetSpeed	Mercedes-AMG GT3 Evo	786	(Thailand) Kiki Sak Nana	Am	All
(Germany) GetSpeed	Mercedes-AMG GT3 Evo	786	(Germany) Adam Osieka	Am	All
(Germany) GetSpeed	Mercedes-AMG GT3 Evo	911	(Finland) Axel Blom	PA	All
(Germany) GetSpeed	Mercedes-AMG GT3 Evo	911	(Luxembourg) Steve Jans	PA	All
(Oman) Al Manar Racing by GetSpeed	Mercedes-AMG GT3 Evo	77	(Oman) Al Faisal Al Zubair	P	1, 3, 7
(Oman) Al Manar Racing by GetSpeed	Mercedes-AMG GT3 Evo	77	(Germany) Fabian Schiller	P	1, 3, 7
(Italy) Il Barone Rampante	Lamborghini Huracán GT3 Evo	8	(Italy) Giuseppe Cipriani	Am	All
(Italy) Il Barone Rampante	Lamborghini Huracán GT3 Evo	8	(Germany) Jens Liebhauser	Am	2
(Germany) racing one	Ferrari 488 GT3 Evo 2020	10	(Germany) Stefan Aust	Am	1–4, 7
(Germany) racing one	Ferrari 488 GT3 Evo 2020	10	(Germany) "Jacob Schell"	Am	1–4, 7
(Germany) racing one	Ferrari 296 GT3	26	(United Kingdom) Omar Jackson	PA	1–4
(Germany) racing one	Ferrari 296 GT3	26	(Canada) Ramez Azzam	PA	1
(Germany) racing one	Ferrari 296 GT3	26	(Zimbabwe) Axcil Jefferies	PA	2–4
(Switzerland) Kessel Racing	Ferrari 488 GT3 Evo 2020 1–2; Ferrari 296 GT3 3–7	11	(Italy) David Fumanelli	PA	1–4, 6–7
(Switzerland) Kessel Racing	Ferrari 488 GT3 Evo 2020 1–2; Ferrari 296 GT3 3–7	11	(France) Frédéric Jousset	PA	1–4, 6–7
(Switzerland) Kessel Racing	Ferrari 488 GT3 Evo 2020 1–2; Ferrari 296 GT3 3–7	38	(Switzerland) Nicolò Rosi	PA	All
(Switzerland) Kessel Racing	Ferrari 488 GT3 Evo 2020 1–2; Ferrari 296 GT3 3–7	38	(Italy) Niccolò Schirò	PA	All
(Switzerland) Kessel Racing	Ferrari 488 GT3 Evo 2020	133	(Turkey) Murat Ruhi Cuhadaroglu	Am	2, 4, 6
(Switzerland) Kessel Racing	Ferrari 488 GT3 Evo 2020	133	(Italy) Emanuele Maria Tabacchi	Am	2, 4, 6
(San Marino) AKM Motorsport	Mercedes-AMG GT3 Evo	16	(Poland) Adrian Lewandowski	Am	2
(San Marino) AKM Motorsport	Mercedes-AMG GT3 Evo	16	(Poland) Andrzej Lewandowski	Am	2
(Germany) Team Motopark	Mercedes-AMG GT3 Evo	17	(Mexico) Diego Menchaca	P	All
(Germany) Team Motopark	Mercedes-AMG GT3 Evo	17	(Argentina) Marcos Siebert	P	1–5
(Germany) Team Motopark	Mercedes-AMG GT3 Evo	17	(France) Thomas Neubauer	P	6
(Germany) Team Motopark	Mercedes-AMG GT3 Evo	17	(Spain) Albert Costa (Note: Drivers who started their first race of the season at the final round are ineligible for points and invisible as far as awarding points to other drivers.)	P	7
(Germany) Team Motopark	Mercedes-AMG GT3 Evo	65	(Germany) Heiko Neumann	Am	All
(Germany) Team Motopark	Mercedes-AMG GT3 Evo	65	(Germany) Timo Rumpfkeil	Am	All
(Germany) Team Motopark	Mercedes-AMG GT3 Evo	75	(Austria) Lukas Dunner	PA	7
(Germany) Team Motopark	Mercedes-AMG GT3 Evo	75	(Denmark) Morten Strømsted	PA	7
(Italy) Oregon Team	Lamborghini Huracán GT3 Evo 2	19	(Netherlands) "Daan Arrow"	P	All
(Italy) Oregon Team	Lamborghini Huracán GT3 Evo 2	19	(Italy) Pietro Perolini	P	All
(Italy) Oregon Team	Lamborghini Huracán GT3 Evo 2	63	(France) Pierre-Louis Chovet	P	All
(Italy) Oregon Team	Lamborghini Huracán GT3 Evo 2	63	(Germany) Maximilian Paul	P	All
(Germany) SPS Automotive Performance	Mercedes-AMG GT3 Evo	20	(South Africa) Mikaeel Pitamber	P	All
(Germany) SPS Automotive Performance	Mercedes-AMG GT3 Evo	20	(Republic of Ireland) Reece Barr	P	1–6
(Germany) SPS Automotive Performance	Mercedes-AMG GT3 Evo	20	(Austria) Dominik Baumann	P	7
(Germany) CBRX by SPS	Mercedes-AMG GT3 Evo	54	(Switzerland) Yannick Mettler	PA	All
(Germany) CBRX by SPS	Mercedes-AMG GT3 Evo	54	(Switzerland) Dexter Müller	PA	All
(Czech Republic) Mirage Motorsport	Mercedes-AMG GT3 Evo	21	(Czech Republic) Libor Milota	Am	3
(Germany) Team GT	Mercedes-AMG GT3 Evo	22	(Germany) Florian Scholze	PA	1–2
(Germany) Team GT	Mercedes-AMG GT3 Evo	22	(Switzerland) Alain Valente	PA	1–2
(Austria) Eastalent Racing	Audi R8 LMS Evo II	23	(Germany) Christopher Haase	P	All
(Austria) Eastalent Racing	Audi R8 LMS Evo II	23	(Austria) Simon Reicher	P	All
(Italy) AF Corse	Ferrari 488 GT3 Evo 2020 1–3; Ferrari 296 GT3 4–7	25	(Italy) Alessandro Cozzi	Am	All
(Italy) AF Corse	Ferrari 488 GT3 Evo 2020 1–3; Ferrari 296 GT3 4–7	25	(Italy) Giorgio Sernagiotto	Am	All
(Italy) AF Corse	Ferrari 488 GT3 Evo 2020 1–3; Ferrari 296 GT3 4–7	51	(Italy) Riccardo Agostini	P	All
(Italy) AF Corse	Ferrari 488 GT3 Evo 2020 1–3; Ferrari 296 GT3 4–7	51	(Italy) Nicola Marinangeli	P	All
(Italy) AF Corse	Ferrari 488 GT3 Evo 2020 1–5; Ferrari 296 GT3 6–7	27	(Italy) Eddie Cheever III	PA	All
(Italy) AF Corse	Ferrari 488 GT3 Evo 2020 1–5; Ferrari 296 GT3 6–7	27	(Italy) Marco Pulcini	PA	All
(Italy) AF Corse	Ferrari 488 GT3 Evo 2020	52	(Brazil) Oswaldo Negri Jr.	Am	7
(Italy) AF Corse	Ferrari 488 GT3 Evo 2020	52	(United States) Jay Schreibman	Am	7
(Italy) AF Corse	Ferrari 488 GT3 Evo 2020	55	(Belgium) Laurent De Meeus	PA	1–4, 6–7
(Italy) AF Corse	Ferrari 488 GT3 Evo 2020	55	(United Kingdom) Jamie Stanley	PA	1–4, 6–7
(Italy) AF Corse	Ferrari 488 GT3 Evo 2020	61	(United States) Conrad Grunewald	Am	All
(Italy) AF Corse	Ferrari 488 GT3 Evo 2020	61	(United States) Jean-Claude Saada	Am	All
(Italy) AF Corse	Ferrari 488 GT3 Evo 2020	71	(France) Franck Dezoteux	Am	4
(Italy) AF Corse	Ferrari 488 GT3 Evo 2020	88	(Switzerland) Gino Forgione	Am	All
(Italy) AF Corse	Ferrari 488 GT3 Evo 2020	88	(Italy) Andrea Montermini	Am	All
(Germany) Huber Motorsport	Porsche 911 GT3 R (992)	30	(Hong Kong) Antares Au	PA	2
(Germany) Huber Motorsport	Porsche 911 GT3 R (992)	30	(Italy) Matteo Cairoli	PA	2
(Italy) Bonaldi Motorsport	Lamborghini Huracán GT3 Evo 2	32	(Croatia) Martin Kodrić	PA	1–3
(Italy) Bonaldi Motorsport	Lamborghini Huracán GT3 Evo 2	32	(Croatia) Sandro Mur	PA	1–2
(Italy) Bonaldi Motorsport	Lamborghini Huracán GT3 Evo 2	32	(Poland) Andrzej Lewandowski	PA	3
(Italy) Bonaldi Motorsport	Lamborghini Huracán GT3 Evo 2	33	(Thailand) Sanporn Jao-Javanil	PA	All
(Italy) Bonaldi Motorsport	Lamborghini Huracán GT3 Evo 2	33	(Serbia) Miloš Pavlović	PA	All
(United Kingdom) Greystone GT	McLaren 720S GT3	66	(United Kingdom) Lewis Proctor	PA	All
(United Kingdom) Greystone GT	McLaren 720S GT3	66	(United Kingdom) Stewart Proctor	PA	All
(United Kingdom) Altitude Racing by Greystone GT	McLaren 720S GT3	84	(United Kingdom) Andrew Gilbert	PA	1–2
(United Kingdom) Altitude Racing by Greystone GT	McLaren 720S GT3	84	(Spain) Fran Rueda	PA	1–2
(United Kingdom) Optimum Motorsport	McLaren 720S GT3	69	(United Kingdom) Samuel De Haan	P	All
(United Kingdom) Optimum Motorsport	McLaren 720S GT3	69	(United Kingdom) Charlie Fagg	P	All
(United Kingdom) Optimum Motorsport	McLaren 720S GT3	72	(United Kingdom) Nick Moss	P	6
(United Kingdom) Optimum Motorsport	McLaren 720S GT3	72	(United Kingdom) Joe Osborne	P	6
(United Kingdom) Altitude Racing by Optimum Motorsport	McLaren 720S GT3	84	(United Kingdom) Andrew Gilbert	PA	4–5, 7
(United Kingdom) Altitude Racing by Optimum Motorsport	McLaren 720S GT3	84	(Spain) Fran Rueda	PA	4–5, 7
(Germany) Liqui Moly Team Engstler	Audi R8 LMS Evo II	80	(Germany) Luca Engstler	P	1, 3
(Germany) Liqui Moly Team Engstler	Audi R8 LMS Evo II	80	(China) Dylan Yip	P	1
(Germany) Liqui Moly Team Engstler	Audi R8 LMS Evo II	80	(South Africa) Kwanda Mokoena	P	3
(Austria) Team Baron Motorsport	Ferrari 488 GT3 Evo 2020	91	(Austria) Ernst Kirchmayr	Am	All
(Austria) Team Baron Motorsport	Ferrari 488 GT3 Evo 2020	91	(Austria) Philipp Baron	Am	1–6
(Austria) Team Baron Motorsport	Ferrari 488 GT3 Evo 2020	91	(Zimbabwe) Axcil Jefferies	Am	7
(Germany) Lionspeed GP	Porsche 911 GT3 R	99	(Germany) Patrick Kolb	P	1–4
(Germany) Lionspeed GP	Porsche 911 GT3 R	99	(Austria) Richard Lietz	P	1–3
(Germany) Lionspeed GP	Porsche 911 GT3 R	99	(Germany) Alfred Renauer	P	4
GT Cup Open Europe entries ineligible to score points
Team	Car	No.	Drivers	Class	Rounds
(Romania) RO1 Racing by Varu Nicu	Porsche 991 GT3 II Cup	21	(Romania) Camil Perian	Am	2
(Romania) RO1 Racing by Varu Nicu	Porsche 991 GT3 II Cup	21	(Romania) Florin Tincescu	Am	2
(Italy) SP Racing	Porsche 991 GT3 II Cup	44	(Italy) Eugenio Pisani	PA	2
(Italy) SP Racing	Porsche 991 GT3 II Cup	44	(Monaco) Stefano Zanini	PA	2
(Italy) SP Racing	Porsche 991 GT3 II Cup	111	(Italy) Fabio Fabiani	Am	2
(Italy) SP Racing	Porsche 991 GT3 II Cup	111	(Italy) Stefano Zerbi	Am	2
(Belgium) Q1-trackracing	Porsche 992 GT3 Cup	52	(Belgium) Xander Przybylak	Am	2
(Belgium) Q1-trackracing	Porsche 992 GT3 Cup	52	(Belgium) Laurent Vandervelde	Am	2
(Belgium) Q1-trackracing	Porsche 992 GT3 Cup	57	(Spain) Fidel Castillo	PA	2
(Belgium) Q1-trackracing	Porsche 992 GT3 Cup	57	(Belgium) Nicolas Vandierendonck	PA	2
(San Marino) GDL Racing	Porsche 992 GT3 Cup	67	(Italy) Gianluca de Lorenzi	Am	2
(San Marino) GDL Racing	Porsche 992 GT3 Cup	67	(Italy) Stefano Borghi	Am	2
(San Marino) GDL Racing	Porsche 992 GT3 Cup	68	(Italy) Samuele Bosio	Am	2
(San Marino) GDL Racing	Porsche 992 GT3 Cup	68	(Italy) Glauco Solieri	Am	2
(San Marino) GDL Racing	Porsche 992 GT3 Cup	166	(Italy) Roberto Fecchio	PA	2
(San Marino) GDL Racing	Porsche 992 GT3 Cup	166	(Finland) Juuso Puhakka	PA	2
(San Marino) GDL Racing	Porsche 991 GT3 II Cup	70	(Italy) Roberto Bosio	Am	2
(San Marino) GDL Racing	Porsche 991 GT3 II Cup	70	(Italy) Maurizio Fondi	Am	2
(France) Orhès Racing	Porsche 992 GT3 Cup	73	(France) Axel Van Straaten	PA	2
(France) Orhès Racing	Porsche 992 GT3 Cup	73	(France) Remi Van Straaten	PA	2
(Estonia) EST1 Racing	Porsche 992 GT3 Cup	77	(Finland) Jori Ala-Jyrä	Am	2
(Estonia) EST1 Racing	Porsche 992 GT3 Cup	77	(Estonia) Alex Reimann	Am	2
(Germany) Mertel Motorsport	Ferrari 488 Challenge Evo	80	(Spain) Jorge Cabezas	PA	2
(Germany) Mertel Motorsport	Ferrari 488 Challenge Evo	80	(Spain) Iván Velasco	PA	2
(Germany) Mertel Motorsport	Ferrari 488 Challenge Evo	81	(Germany) Luca Ludwig	PA	2
(Germany) Mertel Motorsport	Ferrari 488 Challenge Evo	81	(Germany) Axel Sartingen	PA	2
(Germany) Mertel Motorsport	Ferrari 488 Challenge Evo	119	(Italy) Stefano Bozzoni	Am	2
(Germany) Mertel Motorsport	Ferrari 488 Challenge Evo	119	(Spain) Fernando Navarrete	Am	2
(Italy) Enrico Fulgenzi Racing	Porsche 992 GT3 Cup	90	(Japan) Shintaro Akatsu	PA	2
(Italy) Enrico Fulgenzi Racing	Porsche 992 GT3 Cup	90	(Italy) Enrico Fulgenzi	PA	2
(Spain) Volcano Motorsport	Porsche 992 GT3 Cup	116	(United Kingdom) Adam Christodoulou	PA	2
(Spain) Volcano Motorsport	Porsche 992 GT3 Cup	116	Evgenii Leonov (Note: Leonov is Russian, but he competes as neutral competitors as Russian national emblems were banned by the FIA following the Russian invasion of Ukraine.)	PA	2
(Switzerland) Kessel Racing	Ferrari 488 Challenge	169	(Switzerland) Alexandre Bochez	Am	2
(Switzerland) Kessel Racing	Ferrari 488 Challenge	169	(Switzerland) Mikaël Bochez	Am	2

Inter GT entries
Icon	Class
P	Pro Cup
PA	Pro-Am Cup
Am	Am Cup
GT Cup entries
Icon	Class
PA	Pro-Am Cup
Am	Am Cup

== Race calendar and results ==
Round		Circuit	Date	Pole position	Pro Winner	Pro-Am Winner	Am Winner	Cup Pro-Am Winner	Cup Am Winner
1	R1	(Portugal) Algarve International Circuit	29 April	(Switzerland) No. 11 Kessel Racing	(Oman) No. 77 Al Manar Racing by GetSpeed	(Germany) No. 54 CBRX by SPS	(Germany) No. 65 Team Motopark	No Entries	No Entries
1	R1	(Portugal) Algarve International Circuit	29 April	(Italy) David Fumanelli (France) Frédéric Jousset	(Oman) Al Faisal Al Zubair (Germany) Fabian Schiller	(Switzerland) Yannick Mettler (Switzerland) Dexter Müller	(Germany) Heiko Neumann (Germany) Timo Rumpfkeil	No Entries	No Entries
1	R2	(Portugal) Algarve International Circuit	30 April	(Oman) No. 77 Al Manar Racing by GetSpeed	(Germany) No. 17 Team Motopark	(Italy) No. 27 AF Corse	(Italy) No. 25 AF Corse	No Entries	No Entries
1	R2	(Portugal) Algarve International Circuit	30 April	(Oman) Al Faisal Al Zubair (Germany) Fabian Schiller	(Mexico) Diego Menchaca (Argentina) Marcos Siebert	(Italy) Eddie Cheever III (Italy) Marco Pulcini	(Italy) Alessandro Cozzi (Italy) Giorgio Sernagiotto	No Entries	No Entries
2	R1	(Belgium) Circuit de Spa-Francorchamps	28 May	(Austria) No. 23 Eastalent Racing	(United Kingdom) No. 69 Optimum Motorsport	(Germany) No. 30 Huber Motorsport	(Italy) No. 61 AF Corse	(Spain) No. 116 Volcano Motorsport	(Belgium) No. 52 Q1-trackracing
2	R1	(Belgium) Circuit de Spa-Francorchamps	28 May	(Germany) Christopher Haase (Austria) Simon Reicher	(United Kingdom) Samuel De Haan (United Kingdom) Charlie Fagg	(Hong Kong) Antares Au (Italy) Matteo Cairoli	(United States) Conrad Grunewald (United States) Jean-Claude Saada	(United Kingdom) Adam Christodoulou; Evgenii Leonov	(Belgium) Xander Przybylak (Belgium) Laurent Vandervelde
3	R1	(Hungary) Hungaroring	17 June	(Italy) No. 32 Bonaldi Motorsport	(Oman) No. 77 Al Manar Racing by GetSpeed	(Italy) No. 27 AF Corse	(Germany) No. 65 Team Motopark	No Entries	No Entries
3	R1	(Hungary) Hungaroring	17 June	(Croatia) Martin Kodrić (Poland) Andrzej Lewandowski	(Oman) Al Faisal Al Zubair (Germany) Fabian Schiller	(Italy) Eddie Cheever III (Italy) Marco Pulcini	(Germany) Heiko Neumann (Germany) Timo Rumpfkeil	No Entries	No Entries
3	R2	(Hungary) Hungaroring	18 June	(Austria) No. 23 Eastalent Racing	(Italy) No. 63 Oregon Team	(Poland) No. 777 Olimp Racing	(Italy) No. 8 Il Barone Rampante	No Entries	No Entries
3	R2	(Hungary) Hungaroring	18 June	(Germany) Christopher Haase (Austria) Simon Reicher	(France) Pierre-Louis Chovet (Germany) Maximilian Paul	(Poland) Karol Basz (Poland) Marcin Jedliński	(Italy) Giuseppe Cipriani	No Entries	No Entries
4	R1	(France) Circuit Paul Ricard	22 July	(Italy) No. 63 Oregon Team	(United Kingdom) No. 69 Optimum Motorsport	(Italy) No. 27 AF Corse	(Italy) No. 25 AF Corse	No Entries	No Entries
4	R1	(France) Circuit Paul Ricard	22 July	(France) Pierre-Louis Chovet (Germany) Maximilian Paul	(United Kingdom) Samuel De Haan (United Kingdom) Charlie Fagg	(Italy) Eddie Cheever III (Italy) Marco Pulcini	(Italy) Alessandro Cozzi (Italy) Giorgio Sernagiotto	No Entries	No Entries
4	R2	(France) Circuit Paul Ricard	23 July	(Italy) No. 63 Oregon Team	(Italy) No. 63 Oregon Team	(United Kingdom) No. 84 Altitude Racing by Optimum Motorsport	(Germany) No. 65 Team Motopark	No Entries	No Entries
4	R2	(France) Circuit Paul Ricard	23 July	(France) Pierre-Louis Chovet (Germany) Maximilian Paul	(France) Pierre-Louis Chovet (Germany) Maximilian Paul	(United Kingdom) Andrew Gilbert (Spain) Fran Rueda	(Germany) Heiko Neumann (Germany) Timo Rumpfkeil	No Entries	No Entries
5	R1	(Austria) Red Bull Ring	9 September	(Italy) No. 63 Oregon Team	(Italy) No. 63 Oregon Team	(Poland) No. 777 Olimp Racing	(Austria) No. 91 Team Baron Motorsport	No Entries	No Entries
5	R1	(Austria) Red Bull Ring	9 September	(France) Pierre-Louis Chovet (Germany) Maximilian Paul	(France) Pierre-Louis Chovet (Germany) Maximilian Paul	(Poland) Karol Basz (Poland) Marcin Jedliński	(Austria) Philipp Baron (Austria) Ernst Kirchmayr	No Entries	No Entries
5	R2	(Austria) Red Bull Ring	10 September	(United Kingdom) No. 69 Optimum Motorsport	(Italy) No. 51 AF Corse	(Austria) No. 91 Team Baron Motorsport	(Germany) No. 786 GetSpeed	No Entries	No Entries
5	R2	(Austria) Red Bull Ring	10 September	(United Kingdom) Samuel De Haan (United Kingdom) Charlie Fagg	(Italy) Riccardo Agostini (Italy) Nicola Marinangeli	(Poland) Karol Basz (Poland) Marcin Jedliński	(Thailand) Kiki Sak Nana (Germany) Adam Osieka	No Entries	No Entries
6	R1	(Italy) Autodromo Nazionale di Monza	23 September	(Italy) No. 63 Oregon Team	(Italy) No. 63 Oregon Team	(Germany) No. 911 GetSpeed	(Italy) No. 8 Il Barone Rampante	No Entries	No Entries
6	R1	(Italy) Autodromo Nazionale di Monza	23 September	(France) Pierre-Louis Chovet (Germany) Maximilian Paul	(France) Pierre-Louis Chovet (Germany) Maximilian Paul	(Finland) Axel Blom (Luxembourg) Steve Jans	(Italy) Giuseppe Cipriani	No Entries	No Entries
6	R2	(Italy) Autodromo Nazionale di Monza	24 September	(Italy) No. 63 Oregon Team	(Germany) No. 20 SPS Automotive Performance	(Poland) No. 777 Olimp Racing	(Poland) No. 5 Olimp Racing	No Entries	No Entries
6	R2	(Italy) Autodromo Nazionale di Monza	24 September	(France) Pierre-Louis Chovet (Germany) Maximilian Paul	(Republic of Ireland) Reece Barr (South Africa) Mikaeel Pitamber	(Poland) Karol Basz (Poland) Marcin Jedliński	(Poland) Stanislaw Jedliński (Poland) Krystian Korzeniowski	No Entries	No Entries
7	R1	(Spain) Circuit de Barcelona-Catalunya	21 October	(Oman) No. 77 Al Manar Racing by GetSpeed	(Austria) No. 23 Eastalent Racing	(Italy) No. 33 Bonaldi Motorsport	(Italy) No. 8 Il Barone Rampante	No Entries	No Entries
7	R1	(Spain) Circuit de Barcelona-Catalunya	21 October	(Oman) Al Faisal Al Zubair (Germany) Fabian Schiller	(Germany) Christopher Haase (Austria) Simon Reicher	(Thailand) Sanporn Jao-Javanil (Serbia) Miloš Pavlović	(Italy) Giuseppe Cipriani	No Entries	No Entries
7	R2	(Spain) Circuit de Barcelona-Catalunya	22 October	(Italy) No. 63 Oregon Team	(Germany) No. 20 SPS Automotive Performance	(Italy) No. 27 AF Corse	(Italy) No. 8 Il Barone Rampante	No Entries	No Entries
7	R2	(Spain) Circuit de Barcelona-Catalunya	22 October	(France) Pierre-Louis Chovet (Germany) Maximilian Paul	(Austria) Dominik Baumann (South Africa) Mikaeel Pitamber	(Italy) Eddie Cheever III (Italy) Marco Pulcini	(Italy) Giuseppe Cipriani	No Entries	No Entries

== Championship standings ==
=== Points systems ===
Points are awarded to the top 10 (Pro) or top 6 (Am, Pro-Am, Teams) classified finishers. If less than 6 participants start the race or if less than 75% of the original race distance is completed, half points are awarded. For the Endurance Race (Spa) points are multiplied by 2. At the end of the season, the 2 lowest race scores are dropped; if the points dropped are those obtained in the Endurance Race, that will count as 2 races; however, the dropped races cannot be the result of disqualification or race bans.

==== Overall ====
Position	1st	2nd	3rd	4th	5th	6th	7th	8th	9th	10th
Points	15	12	10	8	6	5	4	3	2	1

==== Pro-Am, Am, and Teams ====
Position	1st	2nd	3rd	4th	5th	6th
Points	10	8	6	4	3	2

=== Drivers' championships ===
==== Overall ====
- Note: National sporting body RFEDA invalidated the results of Race 2 at the Red Bull Ring, on an appeal by Team Motopark concerning safety car procedures in the race. The decision provisionally saw Eastalent Racing take both the teams' and drivers' title. However, a subsequent appeal by Optimum Motorsport was heard and upheld by the FIA's International Court of Appeal in January 2024, with the Red Bull Ring results reinstated and Optimum crowned drivers' champions.

Pos.	Driver	Team	POR (Portugal)		SPA (Belgium)	HUN (Hungary)		LEC (France)		RBR (Austria)		MNZ (Italy)		CAT (Spain)		Pts	Net Points
International GT Open
1	(United Kingdom) Charlie Fagg (United Kingdom) Samuel De Haan	(United Kingdom) Optimum Motorsport	2	4	1	4	4	1	6	24†	2	10	4	Ret	2	119	119
2	(Germany) Christopher Haase (Austria) Simon Reicher	(Austria) Eastalent Racing	4	3	2	2	Ret	Ret	2	5	3	2	6	1	6	119	119
3	(Mexico) Diego Menchaca	(Germany) Team Motopark	3	1	3	5	2	2	3	2	11	9	7	13	4	111	111
4	(France) Pierre-Louis Chovet (Germany) Maximilian Paul	(Italy) Oregon Team	10	10	8	3	1	15	1	1	17	1	3	3	5	104	104
5	(Argentina) Marcos Siebert	(Germany) Team Motopark	3	1	3	5	2	2	3	2	11					97	97
6	(Italy) Riccardo Agostini (Italy) Nicola Marinangeli	(Italy) AF Corse	5	9	5	6	5	5	9	4	1	5	2	2	12	92	90
7	(South Africa) Mikaeel Pitamber	(Germany) SPS Automotive Performance	7	5	27	13	6	6	4	3	12	6	1	Ret	1	73	73
8	(Oman) Al Faisal Al Zubair (Germany) Fabian Schiller	(Oman) Al Manar Racing by GetSpeed	1	2		1	3							Ret	3	62	62
9	(Republic of Ireland) Reece Barr	(Germany) SPS Automotive Performance	7	5	27	13	6	6	4	3	12	6	1			58	58
10	(Italy) Eddie Cheever III (Italy) Marco Pulcini	(Italy) AF Corse	12	6	21	7	15	4	11	8	6	12	9	22	7	31	31
11	(Poland) Karol Basz (Poland) Marcin Jedliński	(Poland) Olimp Racing	19	8	13	14	8	16	14	6	4	11	5	18	8	28	28
12	(Germany) Patrick Kolb	(Germany) Lionspeed GP	6	15	40†	16	10	3	5							22	22
13	(Finland) Axel Blom (Luxembourg) Steve Jans	(Germany) GetSpeed	9	11	12	8	16	Ret	12	9	15	4	10	5	11	22	22
14	(United Kingdom) Aaron Walker	(Germany) GetSpeed						21	20	10	7	3	Ret	6	25	20	20
15	(Germany) Alfred Renauer	(Germany) Lionspeed GP						3	5							16	16
16	(Thailand) Sanporn Jao-Javanil (Serbia) Miloš Pavlović	(Italy) Bonaldi Motorsport	28	24	11	18	23	7	10	19	Ret	8	14	4	18	16	16
17	(Hong Kong) Antares Au (Italy) Matteo Cairoli	(Germany) Huber Motorsport			4											16	16
18	(Switzerland) Nicolò Rosi (Italy) Niccolò Schirò	(Switzerland) Kessel Racing	17	12	9	15	12	9	16	7	5	14	11	21	13	16	16
19	(Croatia) Martin Kodrić	(Italy) Bonaldi Motorsport	26	26	6	9	14									12	12
20	(United Kingdom) James Wallis	(Germany) GetSpeed										3	Ret			10	10
21	(United States) Anthony Bartone	(Germany) GetSpeed								10	7			6	25	10	10
22	(Croatia) Sandro Mur	(Italy) Bonaldi Motorsport	26	26	6											10	10
23	(United States) Conrad Grunewald (United States) Jean-Claude Saada	(Italy) AF Corse	20	Ret	7	21	21	14	18	17	23†	18	18	9	21	10	10
24	(Switzerland) Yannick Mettler (Switzerland) Dexter Müller	(Germany) CBRX by SPS	8	14	25	19	11	12	8	14	8	16	13	Ret	10	10	10
25	(United Kingdom) Andrew Gilbert (Spain) Fran Rueda	(United Kingdom) Altitude Racing by Greystone GT	16	16	22											8	8
25	(United Kingdom) Andrew Gilbert (Spain) Fran Rueda	(United Kingdom) Altitude Racing by Optimum Motorsport						8	7	15	10			WD	WD	8	8
26	(Austria) Richard Lietz	(Germany) Lionspeed GP	6	15	40†	16	10									6	6
27	(Italy) David Fumanelli (France) Frédéric Jousset	(Switzerland) Kessel Racing	25	27	26	30	9	27	25			7	23†	14	Ret	6	6
28	(France) Thomas Neubauer	(Germany) Team Motopark										9	7			6	6
29	(Germany) Luca Engstler	(Germany) Liqui Moly Team Engstler	11	13		11	7									4	4
30	(South Africa) Kwanda Mokoena	(Germany) Liqui Moly Team Engstler				11	7									4	4
31	(Italy) Giuseppe Cipriani	(Italy) Il Barone Rampante	15	20	37	17	17	23	21	16	19	17	Ret	7	14	4	4
32	(Germany) Florian Scholze (Switzerland) Alain Valente	(Germany) Team GT	Ret	7	17											4	4
33	(Netherlands) "Daan Arrow" (Italy) Pietro Perolini	(Italy) Oregon Team	14	18	24	12	13	11	13	21	22†	24†	8	Ret	26†	3	3
34	(Austria) Ernst Kirchmayr	(Austria) Team Baron Motorsport	22	25	15	25	20	20	19	11	18	21	19	8	22	3	3
35	(Zimbabwe) Axcil Jefferies	(Germany) racing one			14	22	19	19	26							3	3
35	(Zimbabwe) Axcil Jefferies	(Austria) Team Baron Motorsport												8	22	3	3
36	(United Kingdom) Lewis Proctor (United Kingdom) Stewart Proctor	(United Kingdom) Greystone GT	23	21	41†	26	25	13	24	12	13	15	21	16	9	2	2
37	(Thailand) Kiki Sak Nana (Germany) Adam Osieka	(Germany) GetSpeed	21	23	18	20	18	Ret	DNS	18	9	Ret	15	17	17	2	2
38	(Germany) Heiko Neumann (Germany) Timo Rumpfkeil	(Germany) Team Motopark	13	19	20	10	26	18	15	13	20	20	17	11	16	2	2
39	(Belgium) Laurent De Meeus (United Kingdom) Jamie Stanley	(Italy) AF Corse	Ret	23	10	24	27	17	30†			13	16	15	15	2	2
40	(Poland) Andrzej Lewandowski	(San Marino) AKM Motorsport			19											2	2
40	(Poland) Andrzej Lewandowski	(Italy) Bonaldi Motorsport				9	14									2	2
41	(Italy) Alessandro Cozzi (Italy) Giorgio Sernagiotto	(Italy) AF Corse	18	17	Ret	27	24	10	17	20	14	19	Ret	12	20	1	1
42	(Austria) Philipp Baron	(Austria) Team Baron Motorsport	22	25	15	25	20	20	19	11	18	21	19			0	0
43	(China) Dylan Yip	(Germany) Liqui Moly Team Engstler	11	13												0	0
44	(Poland) Stanislaw Jedliński (Poland) Krystian Korzeniowski	(Poland) Olimp Racing	30	29	Ret	29	Ret	28	29	22	21	25	12	20	24	0	0
45	(United Kingdom) Omar Jackson	(Germany) racing one	24	28	14	22	19	19	26							0	0
46	(Switzerland) Gino Forgione (Italy) Andrea Montermini	(Italy) AF Corse	29	Ret	16	23	28	22	Ret	Ret	16	23	20	Ret	DNS	0	0
47	(Poland) Adrian Lewandowski	(San Marino) AKM Motorsport			19											0	0
48	(Australia) Andrés Latorre Canon	(Germany) GetSpeed						21	20							0	0
49	(Turkey) Murat Ruhi Cuhadaroglu (Italy) Emanuele Maria Tabacchi	(Switzerland) Kessel Racing			32			26	22			22	24			0	0
50	(Switzerland) Pascal Bachmann	(Belgium) Street-Art Racing	21	23	18	31	30	29	28	23	Ret	26	22	Ret	DNS	0	0
51	(France) Jahid Fazal Karim	(Belgium) Street-Art Racing	21	23				29	28	23	Ret	26	22	Ret	DNS	0	0
52	(Czech Republic) Libor Milota	(Czech Republic) Mirage Motorsport				Ret	22									0	0
53	(France) Franck Dezoteux	(Italy) AF Corse						24	23							0	0
54	(Germany) Stefan Aust (Germany) "Jacob Schell"	(Germany) racing one	27	Ret	23	28	29	25	27							0	0
55	(Canada) Ramez Azzam	(Germany) racing one	24	28												0	0
56	(United Kingdom) Nick Moss (United Kingdom) Joe Osborne	(United Kingdom) Optimum Motorsport										Ret	Ret			0	0
57	(South Africa) Xolile Letlaka	(Belgium) Street-Art Racing			18	31	30									0	0
58	(Germany) Jens Liebhauser	(Italy) Il Barone Rampante			37											0	0
Ineligible for championship
-	(Austria) Dominik Baumann	(Germany) SPS Automotive Performance												Ret	1	-	-
-	(Spain) Albert Costa	(Germany) Team Motopark												13	4	-	-
-	(Austria) Lukas Dunner (Denmark) Morten Strømsted	(Germany) Team Motopark												10	13	-	-
-	(Brazil) Oswaldo Negri Jr. (United States) Jay Schreibman	(Italy) AF Corse												19	23	-	-
GT Cup Open
-	(United Kingdom) Adam Christodoulou; Evgenii Leonov	(Spain) Volcano Motorsport			29											-	-
-	(Spain) Jorge Cabezas (Spain) Iván Velasco	(Germany) Mertel Motorsport			30											-	-
-	(Belgium) Xander Przybylak (Belgium) Laurent Vandervelde	(Belgium) Q1-trackracing			31											-	-
-	(Switzerland) Alexandre Bochez (Switzerland) Mikaël Bochez	(Switzerland) Kessel Racing			33											-	-
-	(Italy) Stefano Borghi (Italy) Gianluca de Lorenzi	(San Marino) GDL Racing			34											-	-
-	(Finland) Jori Ala-Jyrä (Estonia) Alex Reimann	(Estonia) EST1 Racing			35											-	-
-	(Italy) Samuele Bosio (Italy) Glauco Solieri	(San Marino) GDL Racing			36											-	-
-	(Italy) Fabio Fabiani (Italy) Stefano Zerbi	(Italy) SP Racing			38											-	-
-	(Italy) Roberto Bosio (Italy) Maurizio Fondi	(San Marino) GDL Racing			39											-	-
-	(Spain) Fidel Castillo (Belgium) Nicolas Vandierendonck	(Belgium) Q1-trackracing			42											-	-
-	(Italy) Stefano Bozzoni (Spain) Fernando Navarrete	(Germany) Mertel Motorsport			Ret											-	-
-	(Germany) Luca Ludwig (Germany) Axel Sartingen	(Germany) Mertel Motorsport			Ret											-	-
-	(Italy) Eugenio Pisani (Monaco) Stefano Zanini	(Italy) SP Racing			Ret											-	-
-	(France) Axel Van Straaten (France) Remi Van Straaten	(France) Orhès Racing			Ret											-	-
-	(Italy) Roberto Fecchio (Finland) Juuso Puhakka	(San Marino) GDL Racing			Ret											-	-
-	(Japan) Shintaro Akatsu (Italy) Enrico Fulgenzi	(Italy) Enrico Fulgenzi Racing			Ret											-	-
-	(Romania) Camil Perian (Romania) Florin Tincescu	(Romania) RO1 Racing by Varu Nicu			Ret											-	-
Pos.	Driver	Team	POR (Portugal)		SPA (Belgium)	HUN (Hungary)		LEC (France)		RBR (Austria)		MNZ (Italy)		CAT (Spain)		Pts	Net Points

† – Drivers did not finish the race, but were classified as they completed over 75% of the race distance.

==== Pro-Am ====
Pos.	Driver	Team	POR (Portugal)		SPA (Belgium)	HUN (Hungary)		LEC (France)		RBR (Austria)		MNZ (Italy)		CAT (Spain)		Pts	Net Points
1	(Italy) Eddie Cheever III (Italy) Marco Pulcini	(Italy) AF Corse	12	6	21	7	15	4	11	8	6	12	9	22	7	75	75
2	(Poland) Karol Basz (Poland) Marcin Jedliński	(Poland) Olimp Racing	19	8	13	14	8	16	14	6	4	11	5	18	8	68	68
3	(Finland) Axel Blom (Luxembourg) Steve Jans	(Germany) GetSpeed	9	11	12	8	16	Ret	12	9	15	4	10	5	11	58	58
4	(Switzerland) Nicolò Rosi (Italy) Niccolò Schirò	(Switzerland) Kessel Racing	17	12	9	15	12	9	16	7	5	14	11	21	13	51	51
5	(Switzerland) Yannick Mettler (Switzerland) Dexter Müller	(Germany) CBRX by SPS	8	14	25	19	11	12	8	14	8	16	13	Ret	10	42	42
6	(Thailand) Sanporn Jao-Javanil (Serbia) Miloš Pavlović	(Italy) Bonaldi Motorsport	28	24	11	18	23	7	10	19	Ret	8	14	4	18	40	40
7	(Croatia) Martin Kodrić	(Italy) Bonaldi Motorsport	26	26	6	9	14									25	25
8	(United Kingdom) Andrew Gilbert (Spain) Fran Rueda	(United Kingdom) Altitude Racing by Greystone GT	16	16	22											23	23
8	(United Kingdom) Andrew Gilbert (Spain) Fran Rueda	(United Kingdom) Altitude Racing by Optimum Motorsport						8	7	15	10					23	23
9	(Italy) David Fumanelli (France) Frédéric Jousset	(Switzerland) Kessel Racing	25	27	26	30	9	27	25			7	23†	14	Ret	22	22
10	(Hong Kong) Antares Au (Italy) Matteo Cairoli	(Germany) Huber Motorsport			4											20	20
11	(Croatia) Sandro Mur	(Italy) Bonaldi Motorsport	26	26	6											16	16
12	(United Kingdom) Lewis Proctor (United Kingdom) Stewart Proctor	(United Kingdom) Greystone GT	23	21	32†	26	25	13	24	12	13	15	21	16	9	16	16
13	(Belgium) Laurent De Meeus (United Kingdom) Jamie Stanley	(Italy) AF Corse	Ret	23	10	24	27	17	30†			13	16	15	15	14	14
14	(Poland) Andrzej Lewandowski	(Italy) Bonaldi Motorsport				9	14									9	9
15	(Germany) Florian Scholze (Switzerland) Alain Valente	(Germany) Team GT	Ret	7	17											8	8
16	(United Kingdom) Omar Jackson	(Germany) racing one	24	28	14	22	19	19	26							0	0
17	(Zimbabwe) Axcil Jefferies	(Germany) racing one			14	22	19	19	26							0	0
18	(Australia) Andrés Latorre Canon (United Kingdom) Aaron Walker	(Germany) GetSpeed						21	20							0	0
19	(Canada) Ramez Azzam	(Germany) racing one	24	28												0	0
Pos.	Driver	Team	POR (Portugal)		SPA (Belgium)	HUN (Hungary)		LEC (France)		RBR (Austria)		MNZ (Italy)		CAT (Spain)		Pts	Net Points

† – Drivers did not finish the race, but were classified as they completed over 75% of the race distance.

==== Am ====
Pos.	Driver	Team	POR (Portugal)		SPA (Belgium)	HUN (Hungary)		LEC (France)		RBR (Austria)		MNZ (Italy)		CAT (Spain)		Pts	Net Points
1	(Germany) Heiko Neumann (Germany) Timo Rumpfkeil	(Germany) Team Motopark	13	19	20	10	26	18	15	13	20	20	17	11	16	80	78
2	(Italy) Giuseppe Cipriani	(Italy) Il Barone Rampante	15	20	30	17	17	23	21	16	19	17	Ret	7	14	76	76
3	(United States) Conrad Grunewald (United States) Jean-Claude Saada	(Italy) AF Corse	20	Ret	7	21	21	14	18	17	23	18	18	9	21	71	71
4	(Austria) Ernst Kirchmayr	(Austria) Team Baron Motorsport	22	25	15	25	20	20	19	11	18	21	19	8	22	67	63
5	(Italy) Alessandro Cozzi (Italy) Giorgio Sernagiotto	(Italy) AF Corse	18	17	Ret	27	24	10	17	20	14	19	Ret	12	20	59	59
6	(Thailand) Kiki Sak Nana (Germany) Adam Osieka	(Germany) GetSpeed	21	23	18	20	18	Ret	DNS	18	9	Ret	15	17	17	58	58
7	(Austria) Philipp Baron	(Austria) Team Baron Motorsport	22	25	15	25	20	20	19	11	18	21	19			57	57
8	(Switzerland) Gino Forgione (Italy) Andrea Montermini	(Italy) AF Corse	29	Ret	16	23	28	22	Ret	Ret	16	23	20	Ret	DNS	26	26
9	(Poland) Stanislaw Jedliński (Poland) Krystian Korzeniowski	(Poland) Olimp Racing	30	29	Ret	29	Ret	28	29	22	21	25	12	20	24	12	12
10	(Zimbabwe) Axcil Jefferies	(Austria) Team Baron Motorsport												8	22	10	10
11	(Poland) Adrian Lewandowski (Poland) Andrzej Lewandowski	(San Marino) AKM Motorsport			19											6	6
12	(Turkey) Murat Ruhi Cuhadaroglu (Italy) Emanuele Maria Tabacchi	(Switzerland) Kessel Racing			29			26	22			22	24			4	4
13	(Czech Republic) Libor Milota	(Czech Republic) Mirage Motorsport				Ret	22									3	3
14	(Germany) Stefan Aust (Germany) "Jacob Schell"	(Germany) racing one	27	Ret	23	28	29	25	27							0	0
15	(France) Franck Dezoteux	(Italy) AF Corse						24	23							0	0
16	(Switzerland) Pascal Bachmann	(Belgium) Street-Art Racing	21	23	18	31	30	29	28	23	Ret	26	22	Ret	DNS	0	0
17	(France) Jahid Fazal Karim	(Belgium) Street-Art Racing	21	23				29	28	23	Ret	26	22	Ret	DNS	0	0
18	(South Africa) Xolile Letlaka	(Belgium) Street-Art Racing			18	31	30									0	0
19	(Germany) Jens Liebhauser	(Italy) Il Barone Rampante			30											0	0
Pos.	Driver	Team	POR (Portugal)		SPA (Belgium)	HUN (Hungary)		LEC (France)		RBR (Austria)		MNZ (Italy)		CAT (Spain)		Pts	Net Points

† – Drivers did not finish the race, but were classified as they completed over 75% of the race distance.

=== Teams' championships ===
Two (2) best results of each team is counted towards the championship.

Pos.	Team	POR (Portugal)		SPA (Belgium)	HUN (Hungary)		LEC (France)		RBR (Austria)		MNZ (Italy)		CAT (Spain)		Pts	Net Points
1	(Austria) Eastalent Racing	4	3	2	2	Ret	Ret	2	5	3	2	6	1	6	73	73
2	(United Kingdom) Optimum Motorsport	2	4	1	4	4	1	6	24†	2	10	4	Ret	2	72	72
2	(United Kingdom) Optimum Motorsport										Ret	Ret			72	72
3	(Germany) Team Motopark	3	1	3	5	2	2	3	2	11	9	7	10	4	65	65
3	(Germany) Team Motopark	13	19	20	10	26	18	15	13	20	20	17	11	16	65	65
4	(Italy) Oregon Team	10	10	8	3	1	11	1	1	17	1	3	3	5	61	61
4	(Italy) Oregon Team	14	18	24	12	13	15	13	21	22	24	8	Ret	26†	61	61
5	(Italy) AF Corse	5	6	5	6	5	4	9	4	1	5	2	2	7	58	58
5	(Italy) AF Corse	12	9	7	7	15	5	11	8	6	12	9	9	12	58	58
6	(Oman) Al Manar Racing by GetSpeed	1	2		1	3							Ret	3	40	40
7	(Germany) SPS Automotive Performance	7	5	27	13	6	6	4	3	12	6	1	Ret	1	39	39
8	(Germany) GetSpeed	9	11	12	8	16	21	12	9	7	3	10	5	11	15	15
8	(Germany) GetSpeed	21	21	18	20	18	Ret	20	10	9	4	15	6	17	15	15
9	(Germany) Lionspeed GP	6	15	31†	16	10	3	5							11	11
10	(Poland) Olimp Racing	19	8	13	14	8	16	14	6	4	11	5	18	8	9	9
10	(Poland) Olimp Racing	30	29	Ret	29	Ret	28	29	22	21	25	12	20	24	9	9
11	(Italy) Bonaldi Motorsport	26	24	6	9	14	7	10	19	Ret	8	14	4	18	8	8
11	(Italy) Bonaldi Motorsport	28	26	11	18	23									8	8
12	(Germany) Huber Motorsport			4											8	8
13	(Switzerland) Kessel Racing	17	12	9	15	9	9	16	7	5	7	11	14	13	3	3
13	(Switzerland) Kessel Racing	25	27	26	30	12	26	22			14	23†	21	Ret	3	3
	(United Kingdom) Altitude Racing by Optimum Motorsport						8	7	15	10					0	0
	(Germany) Liqui Moly Team Engstler	11	13		11	7									0	0
	(Italy) Il Barone Rampante	15	20	30	17	17	23	21	16	19	17	Ret	7	14	0	0
	(Germany) Team GT	Ret	7	17											0	0
	(Germany) CBRX by SPS	8	14	25	19	11	12	8	14	8	16	13	Ret	10	0	0
	(Austria) Team Baron Motorsport	22	25	15	25	20	20	19	11	18	21	19	8	22	0	0
	(United Kingdom) Greystone GT	23	21	32†	26	25	13	24	12	13	15	21	16	9	0	0
	(Germany) racing one	24	28	14	22	19	19	26							0	0
	(Germany) racing one	27	Ret	23	28	29	25	27							0	0
	(United Kingdom) Altitude Racing by Greystone GT	16	16	22											0	0
	(Belgium) Street-Art Racing	21	23	18	31	30	29	28	23	Ret	26	22	Ret	DNS	0	0
	(San Marino) AKM Motorsport			19											0	0
	(Czech Republic) Mirage Motorsport				Ret	22									0	0
Pos.	Team	POR (Portugal)		SPA (Belgium)	HUN (Hungary)		LEC (France)		RBR (Austria)		MNZ (Italy)		CAT (Spain)		Pts	Net Points
