= 2022 ADAC GT Masters =

Sixteenth season of the ADAC GT Masters sports car racing

The 2022 ADAC GT Masters was the sixteenth season of the ADAC GT Masters, the grand tourer-style sports car racing founded by the German automobile club ADAC.

The season began at Oschersleben on April 22, and ended at the Hockenheimring on October 23.

== Calendar ==
The preliminary calendar was announced on 4 October 2021, featuring seven double-header rounds.

Round	Circuit	Location	Race 1	Race 2
1	(Germany) Motorsport Arena Oschersleben	Oschersleben, Saxony-Anhalt	23 April	24 April
2	(Austria) Red Bull Ring	Spielberg, Styria	21 May	22 May
3	(Netherlands) Circuit Zandvoort	Zandvoort, North Holland	25 June	26 June
4	(Germany) Nürburgring (Sprint Circuit)	Nürburg, Rhineland-Palatinate	6 August	7 August
5	(Germany) Lausitzring (Sprint Circuit)	Klettwitz, Brandenburg	20 August	21 August
6	(Germany) Sachsenring	Hohenstein-Ernstthal, Saxony	24 September	25 September
7	(Germany) Hockenheimring	Hockenheim, Baden-Württemberg	22 October	23 October

== Entry list ==
Team	Car	No.	Driver	Class	Rounds
(Germany) Montaplast by Land Motorsport	Audi R8 LMS Evo II	1	(Germany) Christopher Mies		All
(Germany) Montaplast by Land Motorsport	Audi R8 LMS Evo II	1	(Germany) Tim Zimmermann		All
(Germany) Montaplast by Land Motorsport	Audi R8 LMS Evo II	28	(Germany) Christopher Haase		All
(Germany) Montaplast by Land Motorsport	Audi R8 LMS Evo II	28	(Germany) Salman Owega	J	All
(Germany) Montaplast by Land Motorsport	Audi R8 LMS Evo II	29	(Germany) Jusuf Owega	J	All
(Germany) Montaplast by Land Motorsport	Audi R8 LMS Evo II	29	(Switzerland) Ricardo Feller		1, 3–5, 7
(Germany) Montaplast by Land Motorsport	Audi R8 LMS Evo II	29	(Belgium) Dries Vanthoor		2, 6
(Germany) Drago Racing Team zvo	Mercedes-AMG GT3 Evo	4	(France) Jules Gounon		All
(Germany) Drago Racing Team zvo	Mercedes-AMG GT3 Evo	4	(Germany) Fabian Schiller	J	All
(Germany) Mercedes-AMG Team zvo	Mercedes-AMG GT3 Evo	8	(Germany) Jan Marschalkowski	J	All
(Germany) Mercedes-AMG Team zvo	Mercedes-AMG GT3 Evo	8	(Spain) Daniel Juncadella		1–3
(Germany) Mercedes-AMG Team zvo	Mercedes-AMG GT3 Evo	8	(Germany) Luca Stolz		4
(Germany) Mercedes-AMG Team zvo	Mercedes-AMG GT3 Evo	8	(Germany) Marvin Dienst		5–7
(Germany) Schubert Motorsport	BMW M4 GT3	10	(United Kingdom) Ben Green	J	All
(Germany) Schubert Motorsport	BMW M4 GT3	10	(Germany) Niklas Krütten	J	1–5, 7
(Germany) Schubert Motorsport	BMW M4 GT3	10	(Finland) Jesse Krohn		6
(Germany) Schubert Motorsport	BMW M4 GT3	20	(Netherlands) Nicky Catsburg		1–5, 7
(Germany) Schubert Motorsport	BMW M4 GT3	20	(Finland) Jesse Krohn		1–5, 7
(Italy) Dinamic Motorsport	Porsche 911 GT3 R	11	(Austria) Klaus Bachler	G	5
(Italy) Dinamic Motorsport	Porsche 911 GT3 R	11	(Belgium) Adrien de Leener	G	5
(Switzerland) Emil Frey Racing	Lamborghini Huracán GT3 Evo	14	(Finland) Konsta Lappalainen	J	All
(Switzerland) Emil Frey Racing	Lamborghini Huracán GT3 Evo	14	(Austria) Mick Wishofer	J	All
(Switzerland) Emil Frey Racing	Lamborghini Huracán GT3 Evo	19	(France) Franck Perera		All
(Switzerland) Emil Frey Racing	Lamborghini Huracán GT3 Evo	19	(France) Arthur Rougier		All
(Switzerland) Emil Frey Racing	Lamborghini Huracán GT3 Evo	63	(United Kingdom) Jack Aitken		All
(Switzerland) Emil Frey Racing	Lamborghini Huracán GT3 Evo	63	(Spain) Albert Costa		All
(Germany) Rutronik Racing	Audi R8 LMS Evo II	15	(Germany) Luca Engstler		All
(Germany) Rutronik Racing	Audi R8 LMS Evo II	15	(Switzerland) Patric Niederhauser		All
(Germany) Rutronik Racing	Audi R8 LMS Evo II	27	(Germany) Dennis Marschall		All
(Germany) Rutronik Racing	Audi R8 LMS Evo II	27	(Germany) Kim-Luis Schramm	J	All
(Germany) Allied-Racing	Porsche 911 GT3 R	22	(Germany) Sven Müller		All
(Germany) Allied-Racing	Porsche 911 GT3 R	22	(Germany) Joel Sturm	J	All
(Germany) Car Collection Motorsport	Audi R8 LMS Evo II	33	(Italy) Mattia Drudi		All
(Germany) Car Collection Motorsport	Audi R8 LMS Evo II	33	(Netherlands) Thierry Vermeulen	J	All
(Germany) Car Collection Motorsport	Audi R8 LMS Evo II	69	(Germany) Florian Spengler	T	All
(Germany) Car Collection Motorsport	Audi R8 LMS Evo II	69	(Germany) Markus Winkelhock		All
(Germany) ID-Racing with Herberth	Porsche 911 GT3 R	44	(Germany) Robert Renauer		1
(Germany) ID-Racing with Herberth	Porsche 911 GT3 R	44	(Austria) Klaus Bachler		1
(Germany) ID-Racing	Porsche 911 GT3 R	44	(New Zealand) Jaxon Evans		2–3
(Germany) ID-Racing	Porsche 911 GT3 R	44	(Germany) Leon Köhler	J	2
(Germany) ID-Racing	Porsche 911 GT3 R	44	(Germany) Jannes Fittje		3
(Germany) Mann-Filter Team Landgraf	Mercedes-AMG GT3 Evo	48	(Italy) Raffaele Marciello		All
(Germany) Mann-Filter Team Landgraf	Mercedes-AMG GT3 Evo	48	(South Africa) Jonathan Aberdein		1–2
(Germany) Mann-Filter Team Landgraf	Mercedes-AMG GT3 Evo	48	(Italy) Lorenzo Ferrari	J	3
(Germany) Mann-Filter Team Landgraf	Mercedes-AMG GT3 Evo	48	(Germany) Maro Engel		4
(Germany) Mann-Filter Team Landgraf	Mercedes-AMG GT3 Evo	48	(Spain) Daniel Juncadella		5–7
(Germany) Mann-Filter Team Landgraf	Mercedes-AMG GT3 Evo	84	(United Kingdom) Frank Bird	J	All
(Germany) Mann-Filter Team Landgraf	Mercedes-AMG GT3 Evo	84	(Finland) Elias Seppänen	J	All
(Austria) Eastalent Racing Team	Audi R8 LMS Evo II	54	(Austria) Simon Reicher	J	All
(Austria) Eastalent Racing Team	Audi R8 LMS Evo II	54	(Austria) Norbert Siedler		All
(Germany) T3 Motorsport	Lamborghini Huracán GT3 Evo	71	(Italy) Marco Mapelli		1–3
(Germany) T3 Motorsport	Lamborghini Huracán GT3 Evo	71	(Germany) Maximilian Paul	J	1–3
(Germany) Paul Motorsport	Lamborghini Huracán GT3 Evo	71	(Italy) Marco Mapelli		4–7
(Germany) Paul Motorsport	Lamborghini Huracán GT3 Evo	71	(Germany) Maximilian Paul	J	4–7
(Germany) Seyffarth Motorsport	Audi R8 LMS Evo II	77	(Poland) Robin Rogalski	G	7
(Germany) Seyffarth Motorsport	Audi R8 LMS Evo II	77	(Belgium) Frédéric Vervisch	G	7
(Poland) JP Motorsport	McLaren 720S GT3	88	(Austria) Christian Klien	G	2
(Poland) JP Motorsport	McLaren 720S GT3	88	(Denmark) Dennis Lind	G	2
(Spain) Madpanda Motorsport	Mercedes-AMG GT3 Evo	90	(Argentina) Ezequiel Pérez Companc		1–5
(Spain) Madpanda Motorsport	Mercedes-AMG GT3 Evo	90	(Germany) Jannes Fittje	J	1–2
(Spain) Madpanda Motorsport	Mercedes-AMG GT3 Evo	90	(Germany) Maximilian Götz		3–4
(Spain) Madpanda Motorsport	Mercedes-AMG GT3 Evo	90	(Finland) Juuso Puhakka		5
(Germany) Team Joos Sportwagentechnik	Porsche 911 GT3 R	91	(Germany) Christian Engelhart		All
(Germany) Team Joos Sportwagentechnik	Porsche 911 GT3 R	91	(Turkey) Ayhancan Güven		All

Icon	Legend
J	Junior
T	Trophy

== Calendar and results ==
Rnd.	Race	Circuit	Date	Pole position	Race winner
1	1	(Germany) Motorsport Arena Oschersleben	23 April	(Switzerland) #19 Emil Frey Racing	(Germany) #29 Montaplast by Land Motorsport
1	1	(Germany) Motorsport Arena Oschersleben	23 April	(France) Franck Perera (France) Arthur Rougier	(Switzerland) Ricardo Feller (Germany) Jusuf Owega
1	2	(Germany) Motorsport Arena Oschersleben	24 April	(Germany) #15 Rutronik Racing	(Germany) #4 Drago Racing Team zvo
1	2	(Germany) Motorsport Arena Oschersleben	24 April	(Germany) Luca Engstler (Switzerland) Patric Niederhauser	(France) Jules Gounon (Germany) Fabian Schiller
2	3	(Austria) Red Bull Ring	21 May	(Germany) #48 Mann-Filter Team Landgraf	(Germany) #10 Schubert Motorsport
2	3	(Austria) Red Bull Ring	21 May	(South Africa) Jonathan Aberdein (Italy) Raffaele Marciello	(United Kingdom) Ben Green (Germany) Niklas Krütten
2	4	(Austria) Red Bull Ring	22 May	(Germany) #10 Schubert Motorsport	(Germany) #10 Schubert Motorsport
2	4	(Austria) Red Bull Ring	22 May	(United Kingdom) Ben Green (Germany) Niklas Krütten	(United Kingdom) Ben Green (Germany) Niklas Krütten
3	5	(Netherlands) Circuit Zandvoort	25 June	(Switzerland) #14 Emil Frey Racing	(Switzerland) #14 Emil Frey Racing
3	5	(Netherlands) Circuit Zandvoort	25 June	(Finland) Konsta Lappalainen (Austria) Mick Wishofer	(Finland) Konsta Lappalainen (Austria) Mick Wishofer
3	6	(Netherlands) Circuit Zandvoort	26 June	(Switzerland) #63 Emil Frey Racing	(Switzerland) #63 Emil Frey Racing
3	6	(Netherlands) Circuit Zandvoort	26 June	(United Kingdom) Jack Aitken (Spain) Albert Costa	(United Kingdom) Jack Aitken (Spain) Albert Costa
4	7	(Germany) Nürburgring	6 August	(Germany) #48 Mann-Filter Team Landgraf	(Germany) #48 Mann-Filter Team Landgraf
4	7	(Germany) Nürburgring	6 August	(Germany) Maro Engel (Italy) Raffaele Marciello	(Germany) Maro Engel (Italy) Raffaele Marciello
4	8	(Germany) Nürburgring	7 August	(Germany) #48 Mann-Filter Team Landgraf	(Germany) #4 Drago Racing Team zvo
4	8	(Germany) Nürburgring	7 August	(Germany) Maro Engel (Italy) Raffaele Marciello	(France) Jules Gounon (Germany) Fabian Schiller
5	9	(Germany) Lausitzring	20 August	(Germany) #91 Team Joos Sportwagentechnik	(Germany) #91 Team Joos Sportwagentechnik
5	9	(Germany) Lausitzring	20 August	(Germany) Christian Engelhart (Turkey) Ayhancan Güven	(Germany) Christian Engelhart (Turkey) Ayhancan Güven
5	10	(Germany) Lausitzring	21 August	(Germany) #20 Schubert Motorsport	(Germany) #1 Montaplast by Land Motorsport
5	10	(Germany) Lausitzring	21 August	(Netherlands) Nicky Catsburg (Finland) Jesse Krohn	(Germany) Christopher Mies (Germany) Tim Zimmermann
6	11	(Germany) Sachsenring	24 September	(Germany) #48 Mann-Filter Team Landgraf	(Germany) #4 Drago Racing Team zvo
6	11	(Germany) Sachsenring	24 September	(Spain) Daniel Juncadella (Italy) Raffaele Marciello	(France) Jules Gounon (Germany) Fabian Schiller
6	12	(Germany) Sachsenring	25 September	(Germany) #1 Montaplast by Land Motorsport	(Germany) #8 Mercedes-AMG Team zvo
6	12	(Germany) Sachsenring	25 September	(Germany) Christopher Mies (Germany) Tim Zimmermann	(Germany) Marvin Dienst (Germany) Jan Marschalkowski
7	13	(Germany) Hockenheimring	22 October	(Germany) #48 Mann-Filter Team Landgraf	(Germany) #91 Team Joos Sportwagentechnik
7	13	(Germany) Hockenheimring	22 October	(Spain) Daniel Juncadella (Italy) Raffaele Marciello	(Germany) Christian Engelhart (Turkey) Ayhancan Güven
7	14	(Germany) Hockenheimring	23 October	(Germany) #91 Team Joos Sportwagentechnik	(Germany) #4 Drago Racing Team zvo
7	14	(Germany) Hockenheimring	23 October	(Germany) Christian Engelhart (Turkey) Ayhancan Güven	(France) Jules Gounon (Germany) Fabian Schiller

== Championship standings ==
Scoring system

Championship points are awarded for the first fifteen positions in each race. Entries are required to complete 75% of the winning car's race distance in order to be classified and earn points. Individual drivers are required to participate for a minimum of 25 minutes in order to earn championship points in any race.

Position	**1st**	**2nd**	**3rd**	**4th**	**5th**	**6th**	**7th**	**8th**	**9th**	**10th**	**11th**	**12th**	**13th**	**14th**	**15th**
Points	25	20	16	13	11	10	9	8	7	6	5	4	3	2	1
Qualifying	3	2	1												

=== Drivers' championships ===
==== Overall ====
Pos.	Driver	Team	OSC (Germany)		RBR (Austria)		ZAN (Netherlands)		NÜR (Germany)		LAU (Germany)		SAC (Germany)		HOC (Germany)		Points
1	(Italy) Raffaele Marciello	(Germany) Mann-Filter Team Landgraf	3	3^{3}	**3**^{1}	14	14	16	**1**^{1}	**2**^{1}	5	3	**2**^{1}	2	**5**^{1}	Ret	193
2	(Germany) Christian Engelhart (Turkey) Ayhancan Güven	(Germany) Team Joos Sportwagentechnik	5	21	2^{2}	3^{3}	6	8^{2}	5^{3}	13	**1**^{1}	4	5	Ret	1	**4**^{1}	178
3	(France) Jules Gounon (Germany) Fabian Schiller	(Germany) Drago Racing Team zvo	13	1^{2}	12	12	Ret	7	3^{2}	1^{3}	17	10	1^{2}	Ret	16^{3}	1^{3}	153
4	(United Kingdom) Jack Aitken (Spain) Albert Costa	(Switzerland) Emil Frey Racing	18	5	6	8	12	**1**^{1}	7	16	2	2^{3}	11	7	4^{2}	Ret	140
5	(France) Franck Perera (France) Arthur Rougier	(Switzerland) Emil Frey Racing	**2**^{1}	13	10	17	8	3^{3}	15	8	6	14	9	6	2	11	120
6	(Germany) Dennis Marschall (Germany) Kim-Luis Schramm	(Germany) Rutronik Racing	8	7	DSQ	6	2	6	13	7	9	6	3^{3}	14†^{2}	11	8	120
7	(United Kingdom) Ben Green	(Germany) Schubert Motorsport	10	16	1^{3}	**1**^{1}	18†	11	10	11^{2}	11	9	13	8	7	9	118
8	(Germany) Jusuf Owega	(Germany) Montaplast by Land Motorsport	1^{2}	6	7	5	4	DNS	12	17	7	13	17	Ret	8	2^{2}	117
9	(Germany) Niklas Krütten	(Germany) Schubert Motorsport	10	16	1^{3}	**1**^{1}	18†	11	10	11^{2}	11	9			7	9	107
10	(Germany) Sven Müller (Germany) Joel Sturm	(Germany) Allied-Racing	DSQ^{3}	14	4	4	11	5	2	3	15	11^{2}	16	9	12	10	106
11	(Italy) Marco Mapelli (Germany) Maximilian Paul	(Germany) T3 Motorsport	11	18	8	15	7	20†									106
11	(Italy) Marco Mapelli (Germany) Maximilian Paul	(Germany) Paul Motorsport							Ret	10	3^{3}	5	19†	3	3	3	106
12	(Germany) Christopher Mies (Germany) Tim Zimmermann	(Germany) Montaplast by Land Motorsport	12	12	13	13	9	4	8	18†	8	1	8	**11**^{1}	9	12	104
13	(Spain) Daniel Juncadella	(Germany) Mercedes-AMG Team zvo	20	8	16	7	DNS^{2}	17									104
13	(Spain) Daniel Juncadella	(Germany) Mann-Filter Team Landgraf									5	3	**2**^{1}	2	**5**^{1}	Ret	104
14	(Germany) Luca Engstler (Switzerland) Patric Niederhauser	(Germany) Rutronik Racing	9	**2**^{1}	9	10	10	18†	4	12	4^{2}	7	6	Ret	13	Ret	104
15	(Switzerland) Ricardo Feller	(Germany) Montaplast by Land Motorsport	1^{2}	6			4	DNS	12	17	7	13			8	2^{2}	96
16	(Finland) Jesse Krohn	(Germany) Schubert Motorsport	7	4	5	2^{2}	19†	Ret	Ret	9	12	**Ret**^{1}	13	8	Ret	6	91
17	(Finland) Konsta Lappalainen (Austria) Mick Wishofer	(Switzerland) Emil Frey Racing	6	11	18	DNS	**1**^{1}	19	11	6	21†	16	12	Ret	6	5	83
18	(Netherlands) Nicky Catsburg	(Germany) Schubert Motorsport	7	4	5	2^{2}	19†	Ret	Ret	9	12	**Ret**^{1}			Ret	6	80
19	(Germany) Jan Marschalkowski	(Germany) Mercedes-AMG Team zvo	20	8	16	7	DNS^{2}	17	9	Ret	20†	8	4	1	14	Ret	75
20	(South Africa) Jonathan Aberdein	(Germany) Mann-Filter Team Landgraf	3	3^{3}	**3**^{1}	14											56
21	(United Kingdom) Frank Bird (Finland) Elias Seppänen	(Germany) Mann-Filter Team Landgraf	DNS	19	20	18	17	9	6	4	16	Ret	7	10	10	Ret	52
22	(Germany) Maro Engel	(Germany) Mann-Filter Team Landgraf							**1**^{1}	**2**^{1}							51
23	(Italy) Mattia Drudi (Netherlands) Thierry Vermeulen	(Germany) Car Collection Motorsport	16	9	21†	Ret	16	2	Ret	19†	13	15	10	12	17†	7	51
24	(Germany) Marvin Dienst	(Germany) Mercedes-AMG Team zvo									20†	8	4	1	14	Ret	48
25	(Austria) Simon Reicher (Austria) Norbert Siedler	(Austria) Eastalent Racing Team	15	10	14	19	3	10	17	15	14	12	18	13	15	14	47
26	(Germany) Florian Spengler (Germany) Markus Winkelhock	(Germany) Car Collection Motorsport	14	15	Ret	11	20†	14	14	Ret	22	Ret	14	5	Ret	Ret	26
27	(Belgium) Dries Vanthoor	(Germany) Montaplast by Land Motorsport			7	5							17	Ret			21
28	(Germany) Christopher Haase (Germany) Salman Owega	(Germany) Montaplast by Land Motorsport	17	17	17	DNS	13	15	Ret	14	18	18†	15	4	WD	WD	20
29	(New Zealand) Jaxon Evans	(Germany) ID-Racing			15	16	5^{3}	13									18
30	(Germany) Maximilian Götz	(Spain) Madpanda Motorsport					15	12	16	5							16
30	(Argentina) Ezequiel Pérez Companc	(Spain) Madpanda Motorsport	19	20	19	20	15	12	16	5	19	19†					16
31	(Germany) Jannes Fittje	(Spain) Madpanda Motorsport	19	20	19	20											15
31	(Germany) Jannes Fittje	(Germany) ID-Racing					5^{3}	13									15
32	(Austria) Klaus Bachler (Germany) Robert Renauer	(Germany) ID-Racing with Herberth	4	22†													13
33	(Germany) Luca Stolz	(Germany) Mercedes-AMG Team zvo							9	Ret							7
34	(Germany) Leon Köhler	(Germany) ID-Racing			15	16											3
35	(Italy) Lorenzo Ferrari	(Germany) Mann-Filter Team Landgraf					14	16									2
-	(Finland) Juuso Puhakka	(Spain) Madpanda Motorsport									19	19†					0
Guest drivers ineligible to score points
-	(Austria) Christian Klien (Denmark) Dennis Lind	(Poland) JP Motorsport			11	9											0
-	(Austria) Klaus Bachler (Belgium) Adrien de Leener	(Italy) Dinamic Motorsport									10	17					0
-	(Poland) Robin Rogalski (Belgium) Frédéric Vervisch	(Germany) Seyffarth Motorsport													DNS	13	0
Pos.	Driver	Team	OSC (Germany)		RBR (Austria)		ZAN (Netherlands)		NÜR (Germany)		LAU (Germany)		SAC (Germany)		HOC (Germany)		Points

Key
Colour	Result
Gold	Race winner
Silver	2nd place
Bronze	3rd place
Green	Points finish
Blue	Non-points finish
Blue	Non-classified finish (NC)
Purple	Did not finish (Ret)
Black	Disqualified (DSQ)
Black	Excluded (EX)
White	Did not start (DNS)
White	Race cancelled (C)
White	Withdrew (WD)
Blank	Did not participate

**Bold** – Pole
Italics – Fastest Lap

† – Driver(s) did not finish the race but were classified, as they completed more than 75% of the race distance.

==== Junior Cup ====
Pos.	Driver	Team	OSC (Germany)		RBR (Austria)		ZAN (Netherlands)		NÜR (Germany)		LAU (Germany)		SAC (Germany)	HOC (Germany)	Points
1	(United Kingdom) Ben Green (Germany) Niklas Krütten	(Germany) Schubert Motorsport	10	16	1	1	18†	11	10	11	11	9			193.5
2	(Finland) Konsta Lappalainen (Austria) Mick Wishofer	(Switzerland) Emil Frey Racing	6	11	18	DNS	1	19	11	6	21†	16			144
3	(Germany) Joel Sturm	(Germany) Allied-Racing	DSQ	14	4	4	11	5	2	3	15	11			141
4	(Germany) Kim-Luis Schramm	(Germany) Rutronik Racing	8	7	DSQ	6	2	6	13	7	9	6			136
5	(Germany) Jusuf Owega	(Germany) Montaplast by Land Motorsport	1	6	7	5	4	DNS	12	17	7	13			133
6	(Germany) Fabian Schiller	(Germany) Drago Racing Team zvo	13	1	12	12	Ret	7	3	1	17	10			132
7	(Germany) Maximilian Paul	(Germany) T3 Motorsport	11	18	8	15	7	20†							111
7	(Germany) Maximilian Paul	(Germany) Paul Motorsport							Ret	10	3	5			111
8	(United Kingdom) Frank Bird (Finland) Elias Seppänen	(Germany) Mann-Filter Team Landgraf	DNS	19	20	18	17	9	6	4	16	Ret			104
9	(Austria) Simon Reicher	(Austria) Eastalent Racing Team	15	10	14	19	3	10	17	15	14	12			94
10	(Germany) Jan Marschalkowski	(Germany) Mercedes-AMG Team zvo	20	8	16	7	DNS	17	9	Ret	20†	8			85
11	(Netherlands) Thierry Vermeulen	(Germany) Car Collection Motorsport	16	9	21†	Ret	16	2	Ret	19†	13	15			76
12	(Germany) Salman Owega	(Germany) Montaplast by Land Motorsport	17	17	17	DNS	13	15	Ret	14	18	18†			54
13	(Germany) Jannes Fittje	(Spain) Madpanda Motorsport	19	20	19	20									47.5
13	(Germany) Jannes Fittje	(Germany) ID-Racing					5	13							47.5
14	(Germany) Leon Köhler	(Germany) ID-Racing			15	16									17
15	(Finland) Juuso Puhakka	(Spain) Madpanda Motorsport									19	19†			13.5
16	(Italy) Lorenzo Ferrari	(Germany) Mann-Filter Team Landgraf					14	16							13
Pos.	Driver	Team	OSC (Germany)		RBR (Austria)		ZAN (Netherlands)		NÜR (Germany)		LAU (Germany)		SAC (Germany)	HOC (Germany)	Points

† – Driver(s) did not finish the race but were classified, as they completed more than 75% of the race distance.

==== Trophy Cup ====
Pos.	Driver	Team	Points
1	(Germany) Florian Spengler	(Germany) Car Collection Motorsport	187.5

=== Teams' championship ===
Pos.	Team	Manufacturer	OSC (Germany)		RBR (Austria)		ZAN (Netherlands)		NÜR (Germany)		LAU (Germany)		SAC (Germany)	HOC (Germany)	Points
1	(Switzerland) Emil Frey Racing	(Italy) Lamborghini	**2**	5	6	8	**1**	**1**	7	6	2	2			162
2	(Germany) Mann-Filter Team Landgraf	(Germany) Mercedes-AMG	3	3	**3**	14	14	9	**1**	**2**	5	3			141
3	(Germany) Montaplast by Land Motorsport	(Germany) Audi	1	6	7	5	4	4	8	14	7	1			137
4	(Germany) Team Joos Sportwagentechnik	(Germany) Porsche	5	21	2	3	6	8	5	13	**1**	4			129
5	(Germany) Rutronik Racing	(Germany) Audi	8	**2**	9	6	2	6	4	7	4	6			125
6	(Germany) Schubert Motorsport	(Germany) BMW	7	4	1	**1**	18†	11	10	9	11	**9**			116
7	(Germany) Drago Racing Team zvo	(Germany) Mercedes-AMG	13	1	12	12	Ret	7	3	1	17	10			109
8	(Germany) Allied-Racing	(Germany) Porsche	DSQ	14	4	4	11	5	2	3	15	11			104
9	(Germany) Car Collection Motorsport	(Germany) Audi	14	9	21†	11	16	2	14	19†	13	15			71
10	(Austria) Eastalent Racing Team	(Germany) Audi	15	10	14	19	3	10	17	15	14	12			65
11	(Spain) Madpanda Motorsport	(Germany) Mercedes-AMG	19	20	19	20	15	12	16	5	19	19†			49
12	(Germany) Mercedes-AMG Team zvo	(Germany) Mercedes-AMG	20	8	16	7	DNS	17	9	Ret	20†	8			49
13	(Germany) ID-Racing	(Germany) Porsche	4	22	15	16	5	13							39
14	(Germany) T3 Motorsport	(Italy) Lamborghini	11	18	8	15	7	20†							38
15	(Germany) Paul Motorsport	(Italy) Lamborghini							Ret	10	3	10			35
Pos.	Team	Manufacturer	OSC (Germany)		RBR (Austria)		ZAN (Netherlands)		NÜR (Germany)		LAU (Germany)		SAC (Germany)	HOC (Germany)	Points

† – Team did not finish the race but were classified, as it completed more than 75% of the race distance.

== Bibliography ==
- Tim Upietz; Oliver Runschke (2022). ADAC GT Masters Jahrbuch 2022 (in German). Duisburg: Gruppe C Motorsport Verlag. p. 224. ISBN 978-3-948501-20-4.
