= Maximilian Paul =

German racing driver

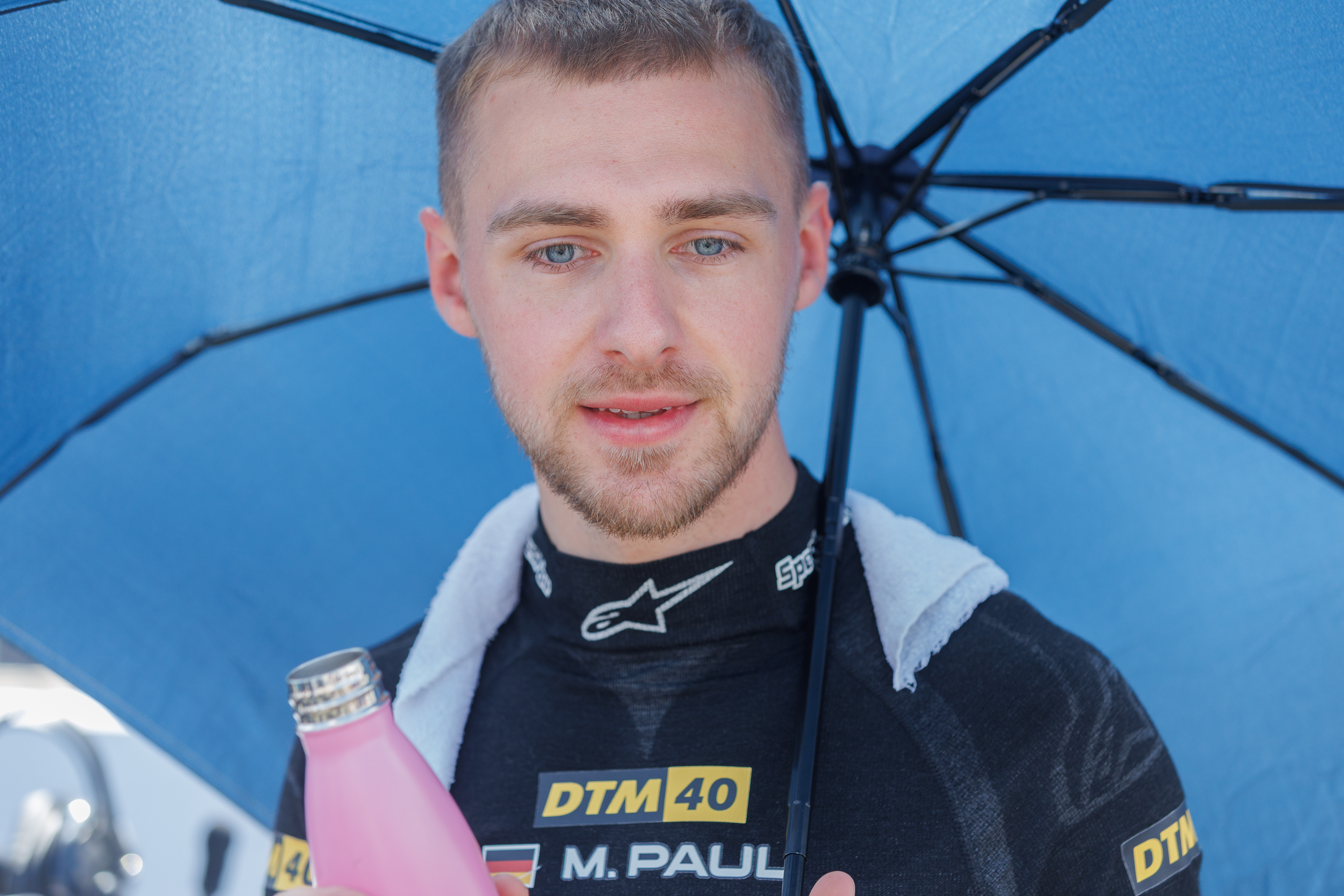
- Paul in 2024
- Nationality: (Germany) German
- Born: 14 February 2000 (age 26) Dresden, Germany

International GT Open career
- Debut season: 2023
- Current team: Oregon Team
- Categorisation: FIA Silver (until 2023); FIA Gold (2024–)
- Car number: 63

Previous series
- 2022 2018–2019: IMSA SportsCar Championship; Audi R8 LMS Cup

Maximilian "Max" Paul (born 14 February 2000) is a German racing driver competing in the DTM and GT World Challenge Europe Endurance Cup for TGI Team by GRT as a Lamborghini factory driver.

== Career ==
=== Karting ===
Paul started karting in 2011. He has competed in the KZ2 category of the CIK-FIA Karting European Championship and WSK Super Master Series as a factory driver of DR Racing Kart.

=== Sports car racing ===
In 2017, Paul made his car racing debut by competing in a round of the DMV BMW Challenge. In 2018, he competed in the Audi R8 LMS Cup. Paul returned to the championship in 2019, competing in four races which he all won. That year he also made his debut in the ADAC GT Masters. He competed in an Audi R8 LMS Evo for the T3 Motorsport team from Dresden, and finished the season in 34th. In 2020, Paul remained in the ADAC GT Masters with T3-HRT-Motorsport. Together with his teammate Niels Langeveld, he finished the season in 30th. Paul also made an appearance in the Audi Sport Seyffarth R8 LMS Cup, where he won both races at Autodrom Most and TT Circuit Assen.

In 2021, Paul started his third season in the ADAC GT Masters with T3 Motorsport, the first aboard a Lamborghini Huracán GT3 Evo. He started the season with Hugo Sasse as his teammate. Later in the season, Sasse was replaced first by Marco Mapelli and then Luca Ghiotto. Paul finished the season in 22nd. In 2021, he also joined T3 for a guest start in the Red Bull Ring round of the Deutsche Tourenwagen Masters. He finished the races in thirteenth and eleventh.

In 2022, Paul was announced as a Lamborghini junior. He remained in the ADAC GT Masters with T3 Motorsport once again. He also joined the team to compete in the 24 Hours of Daytona. The team finished the race eighth in the GTD class. In the ADAC GT Masters, Paul's teammate would be Lamborghini factory driver Marco Mapelli. During the season, the team hit financial troubles and was at risk of insolvency. From the fourth round at the Nürburgring onwards, Paul and Mapelli raced under the name Paul Motorsport with the help of Maximilian's father, Tobias Paul, and his main sponsor Meyle. At the Lausitzring, Paul achieved his first ADAC GT Masters podium. The pair finished the season with three consecutive podiums at the Sachsenring and Hockenheimring to take 11th in the standings.

In 2023, Paul joined Oregon Team to compete in the International GT Open with Pierre-Louis Chovet as his teammate. Paul took four pole positions throughout the season, and led the team to wins at the Hungaroring, Paul Ricard, Red Bull Ring and Monza to take fourth overall. Paul also completed a guest start in the ADAC GT Masters with his father's team Paul Motorsport and teammate Simon Connor Primm.

In 2023, Paul also made his full debut in the Deutsche Tourenwagen Masters, joining GRT Grasser Racing Team as a replacement for Mick Wishofer. He took a shock victory under heavy rain on his first weekend at the Nürburgring. Two seasons in the DTM with family team Paul Motorsport then followed, where Paul notably took pole position at Zandvoort in 2024 and finished third at the same venue in 2025.

In 2026, Paul was named an official Lamborghini factory driver. At the 24 Hours of Nürburgring, Paul took an early lead for Konrad Motorsport after overtaking Porsche driver Kévin Estre. Paul's main programme for the year lied in DTM and the GT World Challenge Europe Endurance Cup, driving the new Lamborghini Temerario GT3 for TGI Team by GRT. On 4 July, Paul suffered a heavy crash after running over an oil spill at the DTM's Norisring round, and broke his lower left leg. In addition to his tibia and fibula, he fractured a lumbar vertebra. Paul returned to action less than two months later, at the Sachsenring.

== Personal life ==
Paul is in a relationship with Latvian racing driver Patricija Stalidzane. They shared a car at the 2026 24 Hours of Nürburgring.

== Racing record ==
=== Career summary ===
Season	Series	Team	Races	Wins	Poles	F/Laps	Podiums	Points	Position
2017	DMV BMW Challenge		?	?	?	?	?	?	?
2018	Audi Sport Seyffarth R8 LMS Cup	Seyffarth Motorsport	4	0	0	0	4	53	11th
2019	ADAC GT Masters	T3 Motorsport	13	0	0	0	0	8	34th
2019	Audi Sport Seyffarth R8 LMS Cup	Seyffarth Motorsport	4	4	4	4	4	88	11th
2020	ADAC GT Masters	T3-HRT-Motorsport	14	0	0	0	0	22	30th
2020	Audi Sport Seyffarth R8 LMS Cup	Seyffarth Motorsport	?	?	?	?	?	?	?
2021	ADAC GT Masters	T3 Motorsport	14	0	0	0	0	37	22nd
2021	Deutsche Tourenwagen Masters	T3 Motorsport	2	0	0	0	0	0	NC†
2022	ADAC GT Masters	T3 Motorsport	6	0	0	0	0	106	11th
2022	ADAC GT Masters	Paul Motorsport	8	0	0	0	4	106	11th
2022	IMSA SportsCar Championship - GTD	T3 Motorsport North America	1	0	0	0	0	239	57th
2023	International GT Open	Oregon Team	13	4	6	1	7	104	4th
2023	ADAC GT Masters	Paul Motorsport	2	0	0	0	1	26	23rd
2023	GT World Challenge Europe Sprint Cup	Paul Motorsport	2	0	0	0	0	0	NC
2023	GT World Challenge Europe Sprint Cup	VSR	4	0	0	0	0	0	NC
2023	Deutsche Tourenwagen Masters	GRT Grasser Racing Team	4	1	0	0	1	28	21st
2024	Deutsche Tourenwagen Masters	Paul Motorsport	16	0	1	1	0	38	18th
2024	Nürburgring Langstrecken-Serie - VT2-R+4WD	Giti Tire Motorsport by WS Racing	2	0	0	0	1	*	*
2024	Nürburgring Langstrecken-Serie - SP9	Konrad Motorsport							
2024	24 Hours of Nürburgring - SP9 Pro-Am	Konrad Motorsport	1	0	0	0	1	N/A	**3rd**
2024	International GT Open	Oregon Team	2	0	0	0	0	8	25th
2024	Lamborghini Super Trofeo Europe	GG Magic Motorsport							
2024	IMSA SportsCar Championship - GTD Pro	Iron Lynx	1	0	0	0	0	202	44th
2025	Deutsche Tourenwagen Masters	Paul Motorsport	16	0	0	0	1	37	19th
2025	GT World Challenge Europe Endurance Cup	Paul Motorsport	5	0	0	0	0	0	NC
2025	GT World Challenge Europe Endurance Cup - Gold	Paul Motorsport	5	0	0	0	0	36	7th
2025	Nürburgring Langstrecken-Serie - SP9	Konrad Motorsport							
2025	24 Hours of Nürburgring - SP9 Pro-Am	Konrad Motorsport	1	0	0	0	1	N/A	**3rd**
2026	Deutsche Tourenwagen Masters	TGI Team by GRT	11	0	0	0	0	14	20th
2026	GT World Challenge Europe Endurance Cup	TGI Team by GRT	4	0	0	0	0	0	NC
2026	Nürburgring Langstrecken-Serie - SP9	Konrad Motorsport							
2026	24 Hours of Nürburgring - SP9	Konrad Motorsport	1	0	0	0	0	N/A	DNF
2026	Italian GT Championship Endurance Cup - GT3	Oregon Team	2	0	0	0	0	17	NC†

=== Complete ADAC GT Masters results ===
(key) (Races in bold indicate pole position) (Races in italics indicate fastest lap)

Year	Team	Car	1	2	3	4	5	6	7	8	9	10	11	12	13	14	DC	Points
2019	T3 Motorsport	Audi R8 LMS Evo	OSC; 1; 23	OSC; 2 Ret	MST; 1; 25	MST; 2 Ret	RBR; 1; 19	RBR; 2 Ret	ZAN; 1; 22	ZAN; 2; 27	NÜR; 1; 24	NÜR; 2 Ret	HOC; 1; 8	HOC; 2; 25	SAC; 1 DNS	SAC; 2; 18	34th	8
2020	T3-HRT-Motorsport	Audi R8 LMS Evo	LAU1; 1; 12	LAU1; 2; 21	NÜR; 1; 12	NÜR; 2; 23	HOC; 1; 23	HOC; 2; 19	SAC; 1; 27	SAC; 2; 11	RBR; 1; 12	RBR; 2; 17	LAU2; 1; 11	LAU2; 2; 22	OSC; 1 Ret	OSC; 2 Ret	30th	22
2021	T3 Motorsport	Lamborghini Huracán GT3 Evo	OSC; 1; 20	OSC; 2; 15	RBR; 1; 18	RBR; 2; 18	ZAN; 1; 15	ZAN; 2; 21	LAU; 1; 11	LAU; 2 Ret	SAC; 1; 8	SAC; 2; 15	HOC; 1 Ret	HOC; 2; 12	NÜR; 1; 6	NÜR; 2; 8	22nd	37
2022	T3 Motorsport	Lamborghini Huracán GT3 Evo	OSC; 1; 11	OSC; 2; 18	RBR; 1; 8	RBR; 2; 15	ZAN; 1; 7	ZAN; 2; 20†									11th	106
2022	Paul Motorsport	Lamborghini Huracán GT3 Evo							NÜR; 1 Ret	NÜR; 2; 10	LAU; 1; 3^{3}	LAU; 2; 5	SAC; 1; 19†	SAC; 2; 3	HOC; 1; 3	HOC; 2; 3	11th	106
2023	Paul Motorsport	Lamborghini Huracán GT3 Evo 2	HOC1; 1	HOC1; 2	NOR; 1	NOR; 2	NÜR; 1; 3^{3}	NÜR; 2; 7	SAC; 1	SAC; 2	RBR; 1	RBR; 2	HOC2; 1	HOC2; 2			23th	26

=== Complete Deutsche Tourenwagen Masters results ===
(key) (Races in bold indicate pole position) (Races in italics indicate fastest lap)

Year	Entrant	Chassis	1	2	3	4	5	6	7	8	9	10	11	12	13	14	15	16	Rank	Points
2021	T3 Motorsport	Lamborghini Huracán GT3 Evo	MNZ; 1	MNZ; 2	LAU; 1	LAU; 2	ZOL; 1	ZOL; 2	NÜR; 1	NÜR; 2	RBR; 1; 13	RBR; 2; 11	ASS; 1	ASS; 2	HOC; 1	HOC; 2	NOR; 1	NOR; 2	NC†	0†
2023	GRT Grasser Racing Team	Lamborghini Huracán GT3 Evo 2	OSC; 1	OSC; 2	ZAN; 1	ZAN; 2	NOR; 1	NOR; 2	NÜR; 1; 13	NÜR; 2; 1	LAU; 1; 19	LAU; 2 Ret	SAC; 1	SAC; 2	RBR; 1	RBR; 2	HOC; 1	HOC; 2	21st	28
2024	Paul Motorsport	Lamborghini Huracán GT3 Evo 2	OSC; 1; 17	OSC; 2 DSQ	LAU; 1; 12	LAU; 2 Ret	ZAN; 1 Ret	**ZAN**; **2**; 9^{1}	NOR; 1; 10	NOR; 2 Ret	NÜR; 1; 15	NÜR; 2; 16	SAC; 1; 15	SAC; 2 Ret	RBR; 1; 6^{2}	RBR; 2; 14	HOC; 1; 16	HOC; 2; 14	18th	38
2025	Paul Motorsport	Lamborghini Huracán GT3 Evo 2	OSC; 1; 12	OSC; 2; 19	LAU; 1 Ret	LAU; 2; 19	ZAN; 1; 3	ZAN; 2; 18	NOR; 1; 16	NOR; 2 Ret	NÜR; 1; 11	NÜR; 2 Ret	SAC; 1; 12	SAC; 2; 14	RBR; 1 Ret	RBR; 2 Ret	HOC; 1; 16	HOC; 2; 10	19th	37
2026	TGI Team by GRT	Lamborghini Temerario GT3	RBR; 1; 16	RBR; 2; 20	ZAN; 1; 13	ZAN; 2 Ret	LAU; 1; 14	LAU; 2 Ret	NOR; 1 Ret	NOR; 2 DNS	OSC; 1	OSC; 2	NÜR; 1	NÜR; 2	SAC; 1 Ret	SAC; 2; 10	HOC; 1; 13	HOC; 2; 17	20th	14

^{†} As Paul was a guest driver, he was ineligible to score points.

=== Complete IMSA SportsCar Championship results ===
(key) (Races in bold indicate pole position; races in italics indicate fastest lap)

Year	Entrant	Class	Make	Engine	1	2	3	4	5	6	7	8	9	10	11	12	Rank	Points
2022	T3 Motorsport North America	GTD	Lamborghini Huracán GT3 Evo	Lamborghini 5.2 L V10	DAY; 8	SEB	LBH	LGA	MDO	DET	WGL	MOS	LIM	ELK	VIR	PET	57th	239
2024	Iron Lynx	GTD Pro	Lamborghini Huracán GT3 Evo 2	Lamborghini 5.2 L V10	DAY	SEB	LGA	DET	WGL	MOS	ELK	VIR	IMS; 13	PET			44th	202

=== Complete International GT Open results ===
(key) (Races in bold indicate pole position) (Races in italics indicate fastest lap)

Year	Team	Car	1	2	3	4	5	6	7	8	9	10	11	12	13	14	DC	Points
2023	Oregon Team	Lamborghini Huracán GT3 Evo 2	PRT; 1; 10	PRT; 2; 10	SPA; 1; 8	HUN; 1; 3	HUN; 2; 1	**LEC**; **1**; 15	**LEC**; **2**; 1	**RBR**; **1**; 1	RBR; 2; 17	**MNZ**; **1**; 1	**MNZ**; **2**; 3	CAT; 1; 3	**CAT**; **2**; 5		4th	104
2024	Oregon Team	Lamborghini Huracán GT3 Evo 2	ALG; 1	ALG; 2	HOC; 1	HOC; 2	SPA; 1	HUN; 1; 7	HUN; 2; 7	LEC; 1	LEC; 2	RBR; 1	RBR; 2	CAT; 1	CAT; 2	MNZ; 1	25th	8

=== Complete GT World Challenge Europe results ===
(key) (Races in bold indicate pole position) (Races in italics indicate fastest lap)

==== GT World Challenge Europe Sprint Cup ====
Year	Team	Car	Class	1	2	3	4	5	6	7	8	9	10	Pos.	Points
2023	Paul Motorsport	Lamborghini Huracán GT3 Evo	Silver	BRH; 1	BRH; 2	MIS; 1	MIS; 2	HOC; 1; 15	**HOC**; **2** Ret					10th	35
2023	VSR	Lamborghini Huracán GT3 Evo 2	Silver							VAL; 1; 20	VAL; 2 Ret	ZAN; 1; 18	ZAN; 2; 20	10th	35

==== GT World Challenge Europe Endurance Cup ====
Year	Team	Car	Class	1	2	3	4	5	6	7	Pos.	Points
2025	Paul Motorsport	Lamborghini Huracán GT3 Evo 2	Gold	LEC; 49	MNZ; 31	SPA; 6H; 45	SPA; 12H; 32	SPA; 24H; 42	NÜR; 43	BAR; 37	7th	36
2026	TGI Team by GRT	Lamborghini Temerario GT3	Pro	LEC; 39	MNZ; Ret	SPA; 6H; 60	SPA; 12H; 60†	SPA; 24H; Ret	NÜR	ALG; 51	NC	0
