= Norbert Siedler =

Austrian racing driver (born 1982)

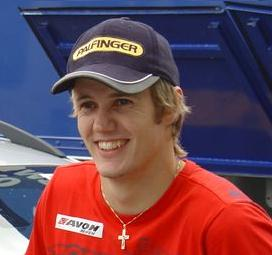
- Siedler in 2007
- Nationality: (Austria) Austrian
- Born: 29 December 1982 (age 43) Wildschönau, Austria
- Categorisation: FIA Gold

Norbert Siedler (born 29 December 1982 in Wildschönau) is an Austrian racing driver who currently competes in the 2025 Nürburgring Langstrecken-Serie for Eastalent Racing in a Audi R8 LMS GT3 Evo II.

== Career ==
Siedler began his career in motorsport in karts. In 1992, he began at the age of ten years in the German Kartszene and in 1997, won the junior class. In 1999, he was an Austrian kart driver. In 2000, he moved into Formula Ford and won in Germany and Austria as well as the championship. In 2001, he drove in the German Formula Three Championship. For the team Palfinger, he finished fourth place twice, including once at Hockenheim supporting the German Grand Prix. In 2002, he was sixth in the championship and finished the season with a victory in the last race at Hockenheim. This was followed by three years in the Italian Euro Formula 3000 Championship. In 2005, he finished second in the overall standing after taking two victories in eight races, losing the championship title to Max Busnelli on a tie-break after finishing tied on 49 points.

In 2003, Siedler traveled to Vallelunga for a Formula One test with Minardi. In 2007 he drove for Kruse Motorsport in the LMP2 class in the Le Mans Endurance Series finishing fifth place at Monza. He made his debut in the Le Mans 24 Hours, again in a Kruse Motorsport Pescarolo-Judd, ending with an engine failure after 98 laps.

Towards the end of the 2007 season, Siedler joined ADM Motorsport in the new racing series International Formula Master. He began his career in the series with victory at Porto and Anderstorp.

Since 2008, Siedler has run in the Porsche Supercup.

== Racing record ==
=== Racing career summary ===
Season	Series	Team	Races	Wins	Poles	F/Laps	Podiums	Points	Position
2000	Austrian Formula Ford Championship	?	?	?	?	?	?	?	**1st**
2001	German Formula Three Championship	Palfinger F3 Racing Team	20	0	0	0	0	24	18th
2002	German Formula Three Championship	Swiss Racing Team	18	1	0	0	3	28	6th
2003	World Series by Nissan	Superfund Zele Racing	12	0	0	0	1	25	15th
2003	World Series by Nissan	RC Motorsport	2	0	0	0	0	25	15th
2003	Euro Formula 3000 Series	Euronova Racing	1	0	0	0	1	4	13th
2004	Euro Formula 3000 Series	ADM Motorsport	10	2	6	2	4	37	**3rd**
2005	3000 Pro Series	ADM Motorsport	8	2	6	3	5	49	**2nd**
2006	Atlantic Championship	Brooks Associates Racing	3	0	0	0	0	13	29th
2006	Le Mans Series - LMP2	Kruse Motorsport	1	0	0	0	1	8	11th
2007	International Formula Master	ADM Motorsport	10	2	0	2	4	40	6th
2007	Le Mans Series - LMP2	Kruse Motorsport	4	0	0	0	0	8	11th
2007	24 Hours of Le Mans - LMP2	Kruse Motorsport	1	0	0	0	0	N/A	DNF
2008	International Formula Master	ADM Motorsport	12	0	0	1	2	22	10th
2008	International Formula Master	Pro Motorsport	2	0	0	0	0	22	10th
2008	Porsche Supercup	Veltins MRS Racing	11	0	0	0	0	39	17th
2009	Porsche Supercup	Veltins MRS Racing	12	0	0	0	2	132	5th
2010	Porsche Supercup	Veltins MRS Racing	10	1	0	1	3	98	**3rd**
2011	Porsche Supercup	Veltins Lechner Racing	11	0	1	0	3	145	**2nd**
2011	ADAC GT Masters	MRS Team PZ Aschaffenburg	2	1	0	1	1	27	24th
2012	Porsche Supercup	Veltins Lechner Racing	11	1	3	3	3	121	4th
2012	Porsche Carrera Cup Germany	Konrad Motorsport	17	1	0	1	4	178	5th
2012	Porsche Carrera Cup Italy	Petricorse Motorsport	2	0	0	0	0	0	NC
2012	24 Hours of Nürburgring - SP9	Timbuli Racing	1	0	0	0	0	N/A	11th
2013	Porsche Carrera Cup Germany	Aust Motorsport	17	1	2	3	4	167	4th
2013	American Le Mans Series - GTC	TRG	1	0	0	0	0	0	NC
2013	Rolex Sports Car Series - GT	Mühlner Motorsports America	1	0	0	0	0	16	62nd
2013	24 Hours of Nürburgring - SP9	Timbuli Racing	1	0	0	0	0	N/A	DNF
2014	Porsche Carrera Cup Germany	ZaWotec Racing	10	0	1	0	0	61	14th
2014	United SportsCar Championship - GTD	Park Place Motorsports	3	0	0	0	0	35	54th
2014	United SportsCar Championship - GTD	Dempsey Racing	1	0	0	0	0	35	54th
2014	Blancpain Endurance Series - Pro-Am	GT Corse by Rinaldi	1	0	0	0	0	0	NC
2014	Blancpain Sprint Series	Trackspeed	2	0	0	0	0	0	NC
2014	ADAC GT Masters	Tonino Team Herberth	10	0	1	0	2	73	13th
2014	24 Hours of Nürburgring - SP9	Haribo Racing Team	1	0	0	0	0	N/A	NC
2015	Blancpain Endurance Series - Pro	Rinaldi Racing	3	0	0	0	0	6	24th
2015	Blancpain Endurance Series - Pro-Am	Rinaldi Racing	2	1	1	0	1	31	12th
2015	Blancpain Sprint Series	Rinaldi Racing	13	2	1	0	6	95	4th
2015	British GT Championship - GT3	Trackspeed	2	0	0	0	0	0	NC
2015	24 Hours of Nürburgring - SP9	Haribo Racing Team	1	0	0	0	0	N/A	DNF
2016	IMSA SportsCar Championship - GTD	Park Place Motorsports	1	0	1	0	0	15	60th
2016	Blancpain GT Series Endurance Cup	Emil Frey Racing	1	0	0	0	0	6	40th
2016	Blancpain GT Series Endurance Cup	Rinaldi Racing	2	0	0	0	0	6	40th
2016	Blancpain GT Series Sprint Cup	Rinaldi Racing	8	0	0	0	0	19	13th
2016	ADAC GT Masters	HB Racing WDS Bau	12	0	0	0	1	32	24th
2016	24 Hours of Nürburgring - SP9	Frikadelli Racing Team	1	0	0	0	0	N/A	DNF
2017	IMSA SportsCar Championship - GTD	Park Place Motorsports	1	0	0	0	0	7	82nd
2017	Blancpain GT Series Endurance Cup	Emil Frey Jaguar Racing	1	0	0	0	0	0	NC
2017	Blancpain GT Series Endurance Cup	Rinaldi Racing	1	0	0	0	0	0	NC
2017	Blancpain GT Series Endurance Cup	GRT Grasser Racing Team	2	0	0	0	0	0	NC
2017	Blancpain GT Series Sprint Cup	GRT Grasser Racing Team	5	0	0	0	1	5	22nd
2017	ADAC GT Masters	HB Racing WDS Bau	13	0	0	0	0	22	25th
2017	24H Series - A6	HB Racing	1						
2017	International GT Open	Farnbacher Racing	2	0	0	0	0	8	31st
2017	24 Hours of Nürburgring - SP9	Frikadelli Racing Team	1	0	0	0	0	N/A	6th
2018	IMSA SportsCar Championship - GTD	Park Place Motorsports	1	0	0	0	0	13	63rd
2018	Blancpain GT Series Endurance Cup	Emil Frey Lexus Racing	5	0	0	0	1	15	27th
2018	Blancpain GT Series Sprint Cup	Emil Frey Lexus Racing	10	0	0	0	0	13	16th
2018	24 Hours of Nürburgring - SP9	Frikadelli Racing Team	1	0	0	0	0	N/A	DNF
2019	International GT Open	Emil Frey Racing	14	4	1	1	7	116	**2nd**
2020	GT World Challenge Europe Endurance Cup	Emil Frey Racing	4	0	0	0	0	0	NC
2020	GT World Challenge Europe Sprint Cup	Emil Frey Racing	7	0	2	1	0	21	14th
2020	ADAC GT Masters	Space Drive Racing by KÜS Team75 Bernhard	2	0	0	0	0	0	NC
2020	ADAC GT Masters	YACO Racing	2	0	0	0	0	0	NC
2020	24 Hours of Nürburgring - SP9	Frikadelli Racing Team	1	0	0	0	0	N/A	DNF
2021	GT World Challenge Europe Endurance Cup	Emil Frey Racing	4	0	0	0	0	16	17th
2021	GT World Challenge Europe Sprint Cup	Emil Frey Racing	8	1	0	1	2	31.5	9th
2021	ADAC GT Masters	YACO Racing	12	0	0	0	0	12	37th
2022	GT World Challenge Europe Endurance Cup	JP Motorsport	2	0	0	0	0	0	NC
2022	GT World Challenge Europe Sprint Cup	JP Motorsport	2	0	0	0	0	0	NC
2022	ADAC GT Masters	Eastalent Racing Team	14	0	0	0	1	47	25th
2023	GT World Challenge Europe Sprint Cup	JP Motorsport	6	0	0	0	0	0	NC
2023	24H GT Series - GT3	JP Motorsport	1						
2025	24 Hours of Nürburgring - SP9 Pro	Eastalent Racing Team	1	0	0	0	0	N/A	5th
2026	International GT Open	ZRS Motorsport	1	0	0	0	0	0	76th
2026	GT4 Italian Series - Pro-Am	Centri Porsche Ticino	4	0	0	0	0	23	NC†

=== Complete Le Mans Series results ===
(key) (Races in bold indicate pole position; races in italics indicate fastest lap)

Year	Entrant	Class	Car	Engine	1	2	3	4	5	6	Pos.	Points
2006	Kruse Motorsport	LMP2	Courage C65	Judd XV675 3.4 L V8	IST	SPA	NÜR	DON	JAR; 2		11th	8
2007	Kruse Motorsport	LMP2	Pescarolo 01	Judd XV675 3.4 L V8	MNZ; 5	VAL; 5	NÜR; Ret	SPA; Ret	SIL	INT	11th	8

=== Complete 24 Hours of Le Mans results ===
Year	Team	Co-Drivers	Car	Class	Laps	Pos.	Class Pos.
2007	(Germany) Kruse Motorsport	(Canada) Tony Burgess (France) Jean de Pourtales	Pescarolo 01-Judd	LMP2	98	DNF	DNF

=== Complete Porsche Supercup results ===
(key) (Races in bold indicate pole position) (Races in italics indicate fastest lap)

Year	Team	1	2	3	4	5	6	7	8	9	10	11	12	13	DC	Points
2008	Veltins MRS Racing	BHR; 17	BHR; Ret	ESP; DNS	TUR; Ret	MON; 16	FRA; 10	GBR; 8	GER; 26	HUN; 24	ESP; 10	BEL; 4	ITA; 11		17th	39
2009	Veltins MRS Racing	BHR; Ret	BHR; 7	ESP; 7	MON; 8	TUR; 5	GBR; 15	GER; 5	HUN; 7	ESP; 9	BEL; 2	ITA; 3	UAE; 4	UAE; 11	5th	132
2010	Veltins MRS Racing	BHR; 23	BHR; 5	ESP; 1	MON; 12	ESP; 2	GBR; 4	GER; 6	HUN; Ret	BEL; 16	ITA; 3				**3rd**	**98**
2011	Veltins Lechner Racing	TUR; 3	ESP; 8	MON; 7	**GER**; 2	GBR; 3	GER; 4	HUN; 4	BEL; 7	ITA; 4	UAE; 4	UAE; 7			**2nd**	**145**
2012	Veltins Lechner Racing	**BHR**; 3	**BHR**; 1	MON; 4	ESP; 11	GBR; 2	GER; Ret	HUN; 5	HUN; 6	BEL; 6	**ITA**; 8				4th	121

=== Complete ADAC GT Masters results ===
(key) (Races in bold indicate pole position) (Races in italics indicate fastest lap)

Year	Team	Car	1	2	3	4	5	6	7	8	9	10	11	12	13	14	15	16	Pos.	Points
2011	MRS Team PZ Aschaffenburg	Porsche 911 GT3 R	OSC; 1	OSC; 2	SAC; 1	SAC; 2	ZOL; 1	ZOL; 2	NÜR; 1	NÜR; 2	RBR; 1; 1	RBR; 2; 9	LAU; 1	LAU; 2	ASS; 1	ASS; 2	HOC; 1	HOC; 2	24th	27
2014	Tonino Team Herberth	Porsche 911 GT3 R	OSC; 1; 7	OSC; 2; 4	**ZAN**; **1**; 12	ZAN; 2; 12	LAU; 1; 2	LAU; 2 Ret	RBR; 1; 6	RBR; 2; 7	SLO; 1; 18	SLO; 2; 15	NÜR; 1; 3	NÜR; 2; 7	SAC; 1	SAC; 2	HOC; 1	HOC; 2	13th	73
2016	HB Racing WDS Bau	Lamborghini Huracán GT3	OSC; 1; 19	OSC; 2; 11	SAC; 1; 15	SAC; 2; 9	LAU; 1; 27	LAU; 2; 21	RBR; 1; 21	RBR; 2; 12	NÜR; 1; 7	NÜR; 2; 14	ZAN; 1; 7	ZAN; 2; 2	HOC; 1	HOC; 2			24th	32
2017	HB Racing WDS Bau	Lamborghini Huracán GT3	OSC; 1; 14	OSC; 2; 4	LAU; 1; 12	LAU; 2; 15	RBR; 1 Ret	RBR; 2; 14	ZAN; 1; 23	ZAN; 2; 20	NÜR; 1; 14	NÜR; 2 Ret	SAC; 1; 15	SAC; 2; 5	HOC; 1 Ret	HOC; 2 DNS			25th	22
2020	Space Drive Racing by KÜS Team75 Bernhard	Porsche 911 GT3 R	LAU; 1; 16	LAU; 2; 24	NÜR; 1	NÜR; 2	HOC; 1	HOC; 2	SAC; 1	SAC; 2									NC	0
2020	YACO Racing	Audi R8 LMS Evo									RBR; 1; 24	RBR; 2 Ret	LAU; 1	LAU; 2	OSC; 1	OSC; 2			NC	0
2021	YACO Racing	Audi R8 LMS Evo	OSC; 1; 22	OSC; 2; 11	RBR; 1 Ret	RBR; 2; 16	ZAN; 1; 21	ZAN; 2; 11	LAU; 1 Ret	LAU; 2; 22	SAC; 1; 23	SAC; 2; 18	HOC; 1; 15	HOC; 2; 15	NÜR; 1	NÜR; 2			37th	12
2022	Eastalent Racing Team	Audi R8 LMS Evo II	OSC; 1; 15	OSC; 2; 10	RBR; 1; 14	RBR; 2; 19	ZAN; 1; 3	ZAN; 2; 10	NÜR; 1; 17	NÜR; 2; 15	LAU; 1; 14	LAU; 2; 12	SAC; 1; 18	SAC; 2; 13	HOC; 1; 15	HOC; 2; 14			25th	47

=== Complete GT World Challenge Europe results ===
==== GT World Challenge Europe Endurance Cup ====
(key) (Races in bold indicate pole position) (Races in italics indicate fastest lap)

Year	Team	Car	Class	1	2	3	4	5	6	7	Pos.	Points
2014	GT Corse by Rinaldi	Ferrari 458 Italia GT3	Pro-Am	MNZ	SIL	LEC	SPA; 6H; 44	SPA; 12H; Ret	SPA; 24H; Ret	NÜR	NC	0
2015	Rinaldi Racing	Ferrari 458 Italia GT3	Pro-Am	**MNZ**; 2			SPA; 6H; 37	SPA; 12H; 27	SPA; 24H; 24		12th	31
2015	Rinaldi Racing	Ferrari 458 Italia GT3	Pro		SIL; 7	LEC; Ret				NÜR; 14	24th	6
2016	Rinaldi Racing	Ferrari 458 Italia GT3	Pro	MNZ; 17	SIL; Ret	LEC	SPA; 6H	SPA; 12H	SPA; 24H		40th	6
2016	Emil Frey Racing	Jaguar XK Emil Frey G3	Pro							NÜR; 7	40th	6
2017	GRT Grasser Racing Team	Lamborghini Huracán GT3	Pro	MNZ; Ret	SIL; 17	LEC; Ret					NC	0
2017	Emil Frey Jaguar Racing	Jaguar XK Emil Frey G3	Pro							CAT; 11	NC	0
2017	Rinaldi Racing	Ferrari 488 GT3	Pro-Am				SPA; 6H; 54	SPA; 12H; 56	SPA; 24H; Ret		NC	0
2018	Emil Frey Lexus Racing	Lexus RC F GT3	Pro	MNZ; 21	SIL; 3	LEC; 35	SPA; 6H; 28	SPA; 12H; 53	SPA; 24H; Ret	CAT; Ret	27th	15
2020	Emil Frey Racing	Lamborghini Huracán GT3 Evo	Pro	IMO; 11	NÜR; Ret	SPA; 6H; 39	SPA; 12H; 31	SPA; 24H; 16	LEC; 11		NC	0
2021	Emil Frey Racing	Lamborghini Huracán GT3 Evo	Pro	MNZ; 23	LEC; 36	SPA; 6H	SPA; 12H	SPA; 24H	NÜR; 4	CAT; 8	17th	16
2022	JP Motorsport	McLaren 720S GT3	Gold	IMO	LEC	SPA; 6H	SPA; 12H	SPA; 24H	HOC; 27	CAT; 26	11th	27

==== GT World Challenge Europe Sprint Cup ====
(key) (Races in bold indicate pole position) (Races in italics indicate fastest lap)

Year	Team	Car	Class	1	2	3	4	5	6	7	8	9	10	11	12	13	14	Pos.	Points
2014	Trackspeed	Porsche 997 GT3-R	Pro	NOG; QR	NOG; CR	BRH; QR	BRH; CR	ZAN; QR	ZAN; CR	SVK; QR	SVK; CR	ALG; QR	ALG; CR	ZOL; QR	ZOL; CR	BAK; QR; 11	BAK; CR; Ret	NC	0
2015	Rinaldi Racing	Ferrari 458 Italia GT3	Pro	NOG; QR; 4	NOG; CR; 5	BRH; QR; 10	BRH; CR; Ret	ZOL; QR; 2	ZOL; CR; Ret	MSC; QR; 2	MSC; CR; 3	ALG; QR; 4	ALG; CR; 3	**MIS**; **QR**; 1	MIS; CR; 1	ZAN; QR; 4	ZAN; CR; DNS	4th	95
2016	Rinaldi Racing	Ferrari 458 Italia GT3	Pro	MIS; QR; 6	MIS; CR; 6													14th	19
2016	Rinaldi Racing	Ferrari 488 GT3	Pro			BRH; QR; 14	BRH; CR; Ret	NÜR; QR; 11	NÜR; CR; 5	HUN; QR	HUN; CR							14th	19
2016	Rinaldi Racing	Ferrari 488 GT3	Pro-Am									CAT; QR; 23	CAT; CR; 22					5th	31
2017	GRT Grasser Racing Team	Lamborghini Huracán GT3	Pro	MIS; QR; Ret	MIS; CR; DNS	BRH; QR; 3	BRH; CR; Ret	ZOL; QR; 7	ZOL; CR; 10	HUN; QR	HUN; CR	NÜR; QR	NÜR; CR					22nd	5
2018	Emil Frey Lexus Racing	Lexus RC F GT3	Pro	ZOL; 1; 14	ZOL; 2; 13	BRH; 1; 9	BRH; 2; 9	MIS; 1; 5	MIS; 2; 8	HUN; 1; 11	HUN; 2; 14	NÜR; 1; 9	NÜR; 2; 8					16th	13
2020	Emil Frey Racing	Lamborghini Huracán GT3 Evo	Pro	MIS; 1; 10	MIS; 2 Ret	MIS; 3; 7	MAG; 1; 2	MAG; 2; 7	**ZAN**; **1**; 16	**ZAN**; **2**; 10	CAT; 1	CAT; 2	CAT; 3					14th	21
2021	Emil Frey Racing	Lamborghini Huracán GT3 Evo	Pro	MAG; 1	MAG; 2	ZAN; 1 Ret	ZAN; 2; 1	MIS; 1; 9	MIS; 2; 12	BRH; 1; 16	BRH; 2; 15	VAL; 1; 6	VAL; 2; 3					9th	31.5
2022	JP Motorsport	McLaren 720S GT3	Pro-Am	BRH; 1	BRH; 2	MAG; 1	MAG; 2	ZAN; 1	ZAN; 2	MIS; 1 Ret	MIS; 2 Ret	VAL; 1	VAL; 2					NC	0
2023	JP Motorsport	McLaren 720S GT3	Bronze			MIS; 1; 23	MIS; 2 Ret	HOC; 1; 25	HOC; 2 Ret	VAL; 1	VAL; 2							10th	14
2023	JP Motorsport	McLaren 720S GT3	Gold	BRH; 1	BRH; 2							ZAN; 1; 25	ZAN; 2; 21					6th	10.5

=== Complete IMSA SportsCar Championship results ===
(key) (Races in bold indicate pole position; races in italics indicate fastest lap)

Year	Entrant	Class	Chassis	Engine	1	2	3	4	5	6	7	8	9	10	11	12	Rank	Points
2014	Park Place Motorsports	GTD	Porsche 911 GT America	Porsche 4.0 L Flat-6	DAY; 21		LGA	DET	WGL	MOS	IMS	ELK	VIR	COA; 10	PET; 13†		35th	54
2014	Dempsey Racing	GTD	Porsche 911 GT America	Porsche 4.0 L Flat-6		SEB; 15†											35th	54
2016	Park Place Motorsports	GTD	Porsche 911 GT3 R	Porsche 4.0 L Flat-6	**DAY**; 17	SEB	LGA	BEL	WGL	MOS	LIM	ELK	VIR	COA	PET		60th	15
2017	Park Place Motorsports	GTD	Porsche 911 GT3 R	Porsche 4.0 L Flat-6	DAY; 24	SEB	LBH	AUS	BEL	WGL	MOS	LIM	ELK	VIR	LGA	PET	82nd	2
2018	Park Place Motorsports	GTD	Porsche 911 GT3 R	Porsche 4.0L Flat-6	DAY; 18	SEB	MOH	BEL	WGL	MOS	LIM	ELK	VIR	LGA	PET		63rd	13

† Siedler did not complete sufficient laps in order to score full points.

Sporting positions
Preceded by none	3000 Pro Series vice-champion	Succeeded by Jan Charouz
