= 2018 24H GT Series =

The 2018 24H GT Series powered by Hankook was the fourth season of the 24H Series with drivers battling for championship points and titles and the eleventh season since Creventic, the organiser and promoter of the series, organises multiple races a year. The races were contested with GT3-spec cars, GT4-spec cars, sports cars and 24H-Specials, like silhouette cars.

== Calendar ==
Round	Event	Circuit	Date	Report
NC1	3x3H Dubai	Dubai Autodrome, Dubai, United Arab Emirates	5–7 January	Report
NC2	3x3H Dubai	Dubai Autodrome, Dubai, United Arab Emirates	5–7 January	Report
NC3	3x3H Dubai	Dubai Autodrome, Dubai, United Arab Emirates	5–7 January	Report
1	24H Dubai	Dubai Autodrome, Dubai, United Arab Emirates	11–13 January	Report
2	12H Silverstone	Silverstone Circuit, Northamptonshire, United Kingdom	9–11 March	Report
3	12H Navarra	Circuito de Navarra, Los Arcos, Spain	20–22 April	Report
4	12H Imola	Autodromo Enzo e Dino Ferrari, Imola, Italy	24–26 May	Report
NC4	3x3H Portimão	Algarve International Circuit, Portimão, Portugal	5–7 July	Report
NC5	3x3H Portimão	Algarve International Circuit, Portimão, Portugal	5–7 July	Report
NC6	3x3H Portimão	Algarve International Circuit, Portimão, Portugal	5–7 July	Report
5	24H Portimão	Algarve International Circuit, Portimão, Portugal	6–8 July	Report
6	24H Barcelona	Circuit de Barcelona-Catalunya, Montmeló, Spain	7–9 September	Report
7	12H Spa	Circuit de Spa-Francorchamps, Spa, Belgium	12–14 October	Report
NC7	3x3H COTA	Circuit of the Americas, Austin, United States	15–17 November	Report
NC8	3x3H COTA	Circuit of the Americas, Austin, United States	15–17 November	Report
NC9	3x3H COTA	Circuit of the Americas, Austin, United States	15–17 November	Report
8	24H COTA	Circuit of the Americas, Austin, United States	16–18 November	Report

Race is part of the Championship of the Continents
Race is part of the European Championship
Race is part of both the Championship of the Continents and the European Championship
Race is part of both the 24H GT Series and the 24H Proto Series

== Entry list ==
A6
Team	Car	No.	Drivers	Class	Rounds
(Switzerland) Hofor-Racing	Mercedes-AMG GT3	1	(Netherlands) Christiaan Frankenhout	A6 1 A6 4	1, 3, 4–7
(Switzerland) Hofor-Racing	Mercedes-AMG GT3	1	(Germany) Kenneth Heyer	A6 1 A6 4	1, 3, 4–7
(Switzerland) Hofor-Racing	Mercedes-AMG GT3	1	(Switzerland) Chantal Prinz	A6 1 A6 4	1, 3, 4–7
(Switzerland) Hofor-Racing	Mercedes-AMG GT3	1	(Switzerland) Michael Kroll	A6 1 A6 4	1, 3, 4–7
(Switzerland) Hofor-Racing	Mercedes-AMG GT3	1	(Switzerland) Roland Eggimann	A6 1 A6 4	1, 3, 4–6
(Switzerland) Hofor-Racing	Mercedes-AMG GT3	1	(Germany) Alexander Prinz	A6 1 A6 4	7
(Germany) Black Falcon	Mercedes-AMG GT3	2	(Netherlands) Yelmer Buurman	A6	1
(Germany) Black Falcon	Mercedes-AMG GT3	2	(Saudi Arabia) Abdulaziz Al Faisal	A6	1
(Germany) Black Falcon	Mercedes-AMG GT3	2	(Germany) Hubert Haupt	A6	1, 8
(Germany) Black Falcon	Mercedes-AMG GT3	2	(Italy) Gabriele Piana	A6	1
(Germany) Black Falcon	Mercedes-AMG GT3	2	(Netherlands) Jeroen Bleekemolen	A6	8
(Germany) Black Falcon	Mercedes-AMG GT3	2	(United States) Ben Keating	A6	8
(Germany) Black Falcon	Mercedes-AMG GT3	2	(Germany) Luca Stolz	A6	8
(Germany) Black Falcon	Mercedes-AMG GT3	3	(Netherlands) Jeroen Bleekemolen	A6	1
(Germany) Black Falcon	Mercedes-AMG GT3	3	(Germany) Manuel Metzger	A6	1
(Germany) Black Falcon	Mercedes-AMG GT3	3	(United Arab Emirates) Khaled Al Qubaisi	A6	1
(Germany) Black Falcon	Mercedes-AMG GT3	3	(Germany) Luca Stolz	A6	1
(Germany) Black Falcon	Mercedes-AMG GT3	3	(Netherlands) Yelmer Buurman	A6	8
(Germany) Black Falcon	Mercedes-AMG GT3	3	(United States) Bret Curtis	A6	8
(Germany) Black Falcon	Mercedes-AMG GT3	3	(United States) Scott Heckert	A6	8
(Germany) Black Falcon	Mercedes-AMG GT3	3	(United States) Mike Skeen	A6	8
(Germany) Black Falcon	Mercedes-AMG GT3	7	(Portugal) Rui Águas	A6	1
(Germany) Black Falcon	Mercedes-AMG GT3	7	(Saudi Arabia) Saud Al Faisal	A6	1
(Germany) Black Falcon	Mercedes-AMG GT3	7	(Greece) Kriton Lendoudis	A6	1
(Germany) Black Falcon	Mercedes-AMG GT3	7	(Saudi Arabia) Saeed Al Mouri	A6	1
(United Kingdom) Ram Racing	Mercedes-AMG GT3	5	(United Kingdom) Tom Onslow-Cole	A6	1–2, 4, 6
(United Kingdom) Ram Racing	Mercedes-AMG GT3	5	(Netherlands) Remon Leonard Vos	A6	1–2, 4, 6
(United Kingdom) Ram Racing	Mercedes-AMG GT3	5	(United Kingdom) Euan Hankey	A6	1
(United Kingdom) Ram Racing	Mercedes-AMG GT3	5	(Netherlands) Rik Breukers	A6	6
(United Kingdom) Ram Racing	Mercedes-AMG GT3	5	(Netherlands) Yelmer Buurman	A6	6
(Germany) Lambda Performance	Ford GT3 Lambda	8	(Hungary) Walter Csaba	A6	1
(Germany) Lambda Performance	Ford GT3 Lambda	8	(Germany) Frank Kechele	A6	1
(Germany) Lambda Performance	Ford GT3 Lambda	8	(Germany) Daniel Keilwitz	A6	1
(Germany) Lambda Performance	Ford GT3 Lambda	8	(Belgium) Nico Verdonck	A6	1
(Germany) BWT Mücke Motorsport	Audi R8 LMS	9	(Switzerland) Ricardo Feller	A6	1
(Germany) BWT Mücke Motorsport	Audi R8 LMS	9	(Germany) Christer Jöns	A6	1
(Germany) BWT Mücke Motorsport	Audi R8 LMS	9	(Germany) Mike David Ortmann	A6	1
(Germany) BWT Mücke Motorsport	Audi R8 LMS	9	(Germany) Andreas Weishaupt	A6	1
(Germany) BWT Mücke Motorsport	Audi R8 LMS	9	(Germany) Markus Winkelhock	A6	1
(Czech Republic) Bohemia Energy racing with Scuderia Praha	Ferrari 488 GT3	11	(Czech Republic) Josef Král	A6	2–7
(Czech Republic) Bohemia Energy racing with Scuderia Praha	Ferrari 488 GT3	11	(Italy) Matteo Malucelli	A6	2–7
(Czech Republic) Bohemia Energy racing with Scuderia Praha	Ferrari 488 GT3	11	(Czech Republic) Jiří Písařík	A6	2–7
(Germany) Manthey Racing	Porsche 991 GT3 R	12	(France) Mathieu Jaminet	A6	1
(Germany) Manthey Racing	Porsche 991 GT3 R	12	(Germany) Lars Kern	A6	1
(Germany) Manthey Racing	Porsche 991 GT3 R	12	(Germany) Otto Klohs	A6	1
(Germany) Manthey Racing	Porsche 991 GT3 R	12	(Germany) Sven Müller	A6	1
(Switzerland) Swiss Team	Mercedes-AMG GT3	15	(Switzerland) Mauro Calamia	A6 3 A6 7	3–7
(Switzerland) Swiss Team	Mercedes-AMG GT3	15	(Switzerland) Christoph Lenz	A6 3 A6 7	3–7
(Switzerland) Swiss Team	Mercedes-AMG GT3	15	(Italy) Roberto Pampanini	A6 3 A6 7	3–6
(Switzerland) Swiss Team	Mercedes-AMG GT3	15	(Luxembourg) Brice Bosi	A6 3 A6 7	5
(Switzerland) Swiss Team	Mercedes-AMG GT3	15	(Switzerland) Joël Camathias	A6 3 A6 7	6
(Germany) SPS automotive performance	Mercedes-AMG GT3	16	(Germany) Lance David Arnold	A6	1, 4, 7
(Germany) SPS automotive performance	Mercedes-AMG GT3	16	(Germany) Tim Müller	A6	1, 4, 7
(Germany) SPS automotive performance	Mercedes-AMG GT3	16	(Germany) Valentin Pierburg	A6	1, 4, 7
(Germany) SPS automotive performance	Mercedes-AMG GT3	16	(Austria) Dominik Baumann	A6	1
(Germany) SPS automotive performance	Mercedes-AMG GT3	24	(Switzerland) Antonin Borga	A6	1, 5, 8
(Germany) SPS automotive performance	Mercedes-AMG GT3	24	(Switzerland) Alexandre Coigny	A6	1, 5, 8
(Germany) SPS automotive performance	Mercedes-AMG GT3	24	(Switzerland) Richard Feller	A6	1, 5, 8
(Germany) SPS automotive performance	Mercedes-AMG GT3	24	(Switzerland) Iradj Alexander	A6	1, 5
(France) IDEC SPORT RACING	Mercedes-AMG GT3	17	(France) Dimitri Enjalbert	A6	2–4, 6
(France) IDEC SPORT RACING	Mercedes-AMG GT3	17	(France) Patrice Lafargue	A6	2–4, 6
(France) IDEC SPORT RACING	Mercedes-AMG GT3	17	(France) Paul Lafargue	A6	2–4
(France) IDEC SPORT RACING	Mercedes-AMG GT3	17	(France) Marvin Klein	A6	6
(Netherlands) V8 Racing	Chevrolet Corvette C6.R ZR1	18	(Netherlands) Rick Abresch	A6	1
(Netherlands) V8 Racing	Chevrolet Corvette C6.R ZR1	18	(Netherlands) Luc Braams	A6	1
(Netherlands) V8 Racing	Chevrolet Corvette C6.R ZR1	18	(Netherlands) Alex van 't Hoff	A6	1
(Netherlands) V8 Racing	Chevrolet Corvette C6.R ZR1	18	(Netherlands) Duncan Huisman	A6	1
(Netherlands) V8 Racing	Chevrolet Corvette C6.R ZR1	18	(United Kingdom) Finlay Hutchison	A6	1
(Netherlands) MP Motorsport	Mercedes-AMG GT3	19	(Netherlands) Bert de Heus	A6 1 A6 7	1, 7
(Netherlands) MP Motorsport	Mercedes-AMG GT3	19	(Netherlands) Daniël de Jong	A6 1 A6 7	1, 7
(Netherlands) MP Motorsport	Mercedes-AMG GT3	19	(Netherlands) Henk de Jong	A6 1 A6 7	1, 7
(Japan) D'station Racing	Porsche 991 GT3 R	20	(Japan) Seiji Ara	A6	1
(Japan) D'station Racing	Porsche 991 GT3 R	20	(Japan) Tomonobu Fujii	A6	1
(Japan) D'station Racing	Porsche 991 GT3 R	20	(Japan) Satoshi Hoshino	A6	1
(Japan) D'station Racing	Porsche 991 GT3 R	20	(Japan) Tsubasa Kondo	A6	1
(United Kingdom) FF Corse	Ferrari 488 GT3	23	(United Kingdom) Ivor Dunbar	A6	2, 6
(United Kingdom) FF Corse	Ferrari 488 GT3	23	(United Kingdom) Bonamy Grimes	A6	2, 6
(United Kingdom) FF Corse	Ferrari 488 GT3	23	(United Kingdom) Johnny Mowlem	A6	2, 6
(United Kingdom) FF Corse	Ferrari 488 GT3	23	(United Kingdom) Charlie Hollings	A6	6
(Germany) HTP Motorsport	Mercedes-AMG GT3	25	(Luxembourg) Brice Bosi	A6	1
(Germany) HTP Motorsport	Mercedes-AMG GT3	25	(Netherlands) Indy Dontje	A6	1
(Germany) HTP Motorsport	Mercedes-AMG GT3	25	(Austria) Alexander Hrachowina	A6	1
(Germany) HTP Motorsport	Mercedes-AMG GT3	25	(Austria) Martin Konrad	A6	1
(Germany) HTP Motorsport	Mercedes-AMG GT3	25	(Germany) Bernd Schneider	A6	1
(United Arab Emirates) GP Extreme	Renault R.S. 01 FGT3	27	(Ivory Coast) Frédéric Fatien	A6	1, 5
(United Arab Emirates) GP Extreme	Renault R.S. 01 FGT3	27	(South Africa) Jordan Grogor	A6	1, 5
(United Arab Emirates) GP Extreme	Renault R.S. 01 FGT3	27	(Canada) Bassam Kronfli	A6	1, 5
(United Arab Emirates) GP Extreme	Renault R.S. 01 FGT3	27	(Germany) Roald Goethe	A6	1
(United Arab Emirates) GP Extreme	Renault R.S. 01 FGT3	27	(United Kingdom) Stuart Hall	A6	1
(United Arab Emirates) GP Extreme	Renault R.S. 01 FGT3	27	(Netherlands) Nicky Pastorelli	A6	5
(United Arab Emirates) GP Extreme	Renault R.S. 01 FGT3	27	(France) Jean-Pierre Valentini	A6	5
(United Arab Emirates) GP Extreme	Renault R.S. 01 FGT3	28	(Zimbabwe) Axcil Jefferies	A6	1
(United Arab Emirates) GP Extreme	Renault R.S. 01 FGT3	28	(Canada) Bassam Kronfli	A6	1
(United Arab Emirates) GP Extreme	Renault R.S. 01 FGT3	28	(Netherlands) Nicky Pastorelli	A6	1
(United Arab Emirates) GP Extreme	Renault R.S. 01 FGT3	28	(France) Jean-Pierre Valentini	A6	1
(United Arab Emirates) GP Extreme	Renault R.S. 01 FGT3	28	(France) Alban Varutti	A6	1
(Poland) Förch Racing	Porsche 991 GT3 R	29	(Austria) Željko Drmić	A6	2–4
(Poland) Förch Racing	Porsche 991 GT3 R	29	(Germany) Patrick Eisemann	A6	2–4
(Poland) Förch Racing	Porsche 991 GT3 R	29	(Poland) Robert Lukas	A6	2–4
(United Kingdom) ROFGO Racing	Mercedes-AMG GT3	31	(United Kingdom) Daniel Brown	A6	2, 6
(United Kingdom) ROFGO Racing	Mercedes-AMG GT3	31	(Germany) Roald Goethe	A6	2, 6
(United Kingdom) ROFGO Racing	Mercedes-AMG GT3	31	(United Kingdom) Stuart Hall	A6	2, 6
(United Kingdom) ROFGO Racing	Mercedes-AMG GT3	31	(Germany) Thomas Jäger	A6	6
(Germany) Car Collection Motorsport	Audi R8 LMS	32	(Germany) Christopher Haase	A6	5
(Germany) Car Collection Motorsport	Audi R8 LMS	32	(Germany) Pierre Kaffer	A6	5
(Germany) Car Collection Motorsport	Audi R8 LMS	32	(Switzerland) Jeffrey Schmidt	A6	5
(Germany) Car Collection Motorsport	Audi R8 LMS	32	(Germany) Peter Schmidt	A6	5
(Germany) Car Collection Motorsport	Audi R8 LMS	33	(Spain) Isaac Tutumlu	A6	1–6
(Germany) Car Collection Motorsport	Audi R8 LMS	33	(Germany) Dimitri Parhofer	A6	1–2
(Germany) Car Collection Motorsport	Audi R8 LMS	33	(Germany) Dirg Parhofer	A6	1, 3
(Germany) Car Collection Motorsport	Audi R8 LMS	33	(Germany) Frank Stippler	A6	1
(Germany) Car Collection Motorsport	Audi R8 LMS	33	(France) Rémi Terrail	A6	1
(Germany) Car Collection Motorsport	Audi R8 LMS	33	(Turkey) Ali Çapan	A6	2–6
(Germany) Car Collection Motorsport	Audi R8 LMS	33	(United Kingdom) Jason Baker	A6	2
(Germany) Car Collection Motorsport	Audi R8 LMS	33	(Germany) Peter Schmidt	A6	3, 7
(Germany) Car Collection Motorsport	Audi R8 LMS	33	(Austria) Horst Felbermayr Jr.	A6	4
(Germany) Car Collection Motorsport	Audi R8 LMS	33	(Austria) Siegfried Kuzdas	A6	4–5
(Germany) Car Collection Motorsport	Audi R8 LMS	33	(Germany) Stefan Aust	A6	5–7
(Germany) Car Collection Motorsport	Audi R8 LMS	33	(Germany) Edward Lewis Brauner	A6	5
(Germany) Car Collection Motorsport	Audi R8 LMS	33	(Germany) Alex Autumn	A6	6
(Germany) Car Collection Motorsport	Audi R8 LMS	33	(Spain) Ivan Pareras	A6	6
(Germany) Car Collection Motorsport	Audi R8 LMS	33	(Spain) Toni Forné	A6	7
(Germany) Car Collection Motorsport	Audi R8 LMS	33	(Germany) Christian Bollrath	A6	7
(Germany) Car Collection Motorsport	Audi R8 LMS	34	(Germany) Elmar Grimm	A6	1–3, 5–7
(Germany) Car Collection Motorsport	Audi R8 LMS	34	(Germany) Johannes Kirchhoff	A6	1–2, 4–8
(Germany) Car Collection Motorsport	Audi R8 LMS	34	(Germany) Ingo Vogler	A6	1–2, 4–8
(Germany) Car Collection Motorsport	Audi R8 LMS	34	(Germany) Gustav Edelhoff	A6	1, 3–6, 8
(Germany) Car Collection Motorsport	Audi R8 LMS	34	(Norway) Wiggo Dalmo	A6	1
(Germany) Car Collection Motorsport	Audi R8 LMS	34	(Germany) Max Edelhoff	A6	3, 5–8
(Austria) HB Racing	Ferrari 488 GT3	41	(Australia) Martin Berry	A6	8
(Austria) HB Racing	Ferrari 488 GT3	41	(Germany) Edward Lewis Brauner	A6	8
(Austria) HB Racing	Ferrari 488 GT3	41	(Italy) Angelo Negro	A6	8
(Austria) HB Racing	Ferrari 488 GT3	41	(China) Huilin Han	A6	8
(Austria) HB Racing	Ferrari 488 GT3	41	(United States) Mike Hedlund	A6	8
(Germany) MDC-Sports	Mercedes-AMG GT3	42	(Switzerland) Adrian Zumstein	A6	7
(Germany) MDC-Sports	Mercedes-AMG GT3	42	(Switzerland) Manuel Zumstein	A6	7
(Germany) MDC-Sports	Mercedes-AMG GT3	42	(Switzerland) Philipp Zumstein	A6	7
(United States) / Scuderia Cameron Glickenhaus (Note: Car No. 49 entered as Scuderia Cameron Glickenhaus and car No. 704 entered as LightSpeed Racing.); (United States) / LightSpeed Racing	Scuderia Cameron Glickenhaus SCG 003	49	(Germany) Felipe Fernández Laser	A6	8
(United States) / Scuderia Cameron Glickenhaus; (United States) / LightSpeed Racing	Scuderia Cameron Glickenhaus SCG 003	49	(Italy) Piero Longhi	A6	8
(United States) / Scuderia Cameron Glickenhaus; (United States) / LightSpeed Racing	Scuderia Cameron Glickenhaus SCG 003	49	(France) Franck Mailleux	A6	8
(United States) / Scuderia Cameron Glickenhaus; (United States) / LightSpeed Racing	Scuderia Cameron Glickenhaus SCG 003	49	(Germany) Thomas Mutsch	A6	8
(United States) / Scuderia Cameron Glickenhaus; (United States) / LightSpeed Racing	Scuderia Cameron Glickenhaus SCG 003	704	(United States) Jon Miller	A6	8
(United States) / Scuderia Cameron Glickenhaus; (United States) / LightSpeed Racing	Scuderia Cameron Glickenhaus SCG 003	704	(Sweden) Andreas Simonsen	A6	8
(United States) / Scuderia Cameron Glickenhaus; (United States) / LightSpeed Racing	Scuderia Cameron Glickenhaus SCG 003	704	(United States) Craig Stanton	A6	8
(United States) / Scuderia Cameron Glickenhaus; (United States) / LightSpeed Racing	Scuderia Cameron Glickenhaus SCG 003	704	(United States) Jeff Westphal	A6	8
(Germany) Attempto Racing	Lamborghini Huracán GT3	66	(Germany) Edward Lewis Brauner	A6 1 A6 2	1
(Germany) Attempto Racing	Lamborghini Huracán GT3	66	(Spain) Alex Riberas	A6 1 A6 2	1
(Germany) Attempto Racing	Lamborghini Huracán GT3	66	(Austria) Clemens Schmid	A6 1 A6 2	1
(Germany) Attempto Racing	Lamborghini Huracán GT3	66	(Netherlands) Pieter Schothorst	A6 1 A6 2	1
(Germany) Attempto Racing	Lamborghini Huracán GT3	66	(Netherlands) Steijn Schothorst	A6 1 A6 2	1–2
(Germany) Attempto Racing	Lamborghini Huracán GT3	66	(Switzerland) Adrian Amstutz	A6 1 A6 2	2
(Germany) Attempto Racing	Lamborghini Huracán GT3	66	(Germany) Jürgen Krebs	A6 1 A6 2	2
(Germany) PROsport Performance	Mercedes-AMG GT3	85	(United States) Charles Espenlaub	A6	All
(Germany) PROsport Performance	Mercedes-AMG GT3	85	(United States) Joe Foster	A6	All
(Germany) PROsport Performance	Mercedes-AMG GT3	85	(United States) Charles Putman	A6	All
(Germany) PROsport Performance	Mercedes-AMG GT3	85	(United Kingdom) Adam Christodoulou	A6	1, 5–8
(Belgium) Comtoyou Racing	Audi R8 LMS Ultra	86	(Belgium) Angélique Detavernier	A6	7
(Belgium) Comtoyou Racing	Audi R8 LMS Ultra	86	(Belgium) Louis-Philippe Soenen	A6	7
(Belgium) Comtoyou Racing	Audi R8 LMS Ultra	86	(Belgium) Frédéric Vervisch	A6	7
(United Kingdom) Optimum Motorsport	Audi R8 LMS	96	(United Kingdom) Bradley Ellis	A6	1
(United Kingdom) Optimum Motorsport	Audi R8 LMS	96	(Germany) Christopher Haase	A6	1
(United Kingdom) Optimum Motorsport	Audi R8 LMS	96	(United Kingdom) Ollie Wilkinson	A6	1
(Germany) Wochenspiegel Team Monschau	Ferrari 488 GT3	488	(Germany) Oliver Kainz	A6	6
(Germany) Wochenspiegel Team Monschau	Ferrari 488 GT3	488	(Germany) Jochen Krumbach	A6	6
(Germany) Wochenspiegel Team Monschau	Ferrari 488 GT3	488	(Germany) Nico Menzel	A6	6
(Germany) Wochenspiegel Team Monschau	Ferrari 488 GT3	488	(Germany) Georg Weiss	A6	6
(Switzerland) R-Motorsport	Aston Martin V12 Vantage GT3	620	(Switzerland) Andreas Baenziger	A6	6, 8
(Switzerland) R-Motorsport	Aston Martin V12 Vantage GT3	620	(Australia) Peter Leemhuis	A6	6, 8
(Switzerland) R-Motorsport	Aston Martin V12 Vantage GT3	620	(United Kingdom) Jake Dennis	A6	6
(Switzerland) R-Motorsport	Aston Martin V12 Vantage GT3	620	(Germany) Markus Lungstrass	A6	6
(Switzerland) R-Motorsport	Aston Martin V12 Vantage GT3	620	(Austria) Florian Kamelger	A6	8
(Switzerland) R-Motorsport	Aston Martin V12 Vantage GT3	620	(Germany) Marvin Kirchhöfer	A6	8
(Saudi Arabia) MS7 by WRT	Audi R8 LMS	777	(Germany) Christopher Mies	A6	1
(Saudi Arabia) MS7 by WRT	Audi R8 LMS	777	(Saudi Arabia) Mohammed Bin Saud Al Saud	A6	1
(Saudi Arabia) MS7 by WRT	Audi R8 LMS	777	(Belgium) Dries Vanthoor	A6	1
(Saudi Arabia) MS7 by WRT	Audi R8 LMS	777	(Netherlands) Michael Vergers	A6	1
(Germany) Herberth Motorsport	Porsche 991 GT3 R	911	(Switzerland) Daniel Allemann	A6 1 A6 2	1–4, 6-8
(Germany) Herberth Motorsport	Porsche 991 GT3 R	911	(Germany) Ralf Bohn	A6 1 A6 2	1–4, 6-8
(Germany) Herberth Motorsport	Porsche 991 GT3 R	911	(Germany) Robert Renauer	A6 1 A6 2	1–4, 8
(Germany) Herberth Motorsport	Porsche 991 GT3 R	911	(Germany) Alfred Renauer	A6 1 A6 2	1–2, 4, 6-8
(Germany) Herberth Motorsport	Porsche 991 GT3 R	911	(Norway) Dennis Olsen	A6 1 A6 2	1
(Germany) Herberth Motorsport	Porsche 991 GT3 R	911	(Australia) Matt Campbell	A6 1 A6 2	6
(Austria) GRT Grasser Racing Team	Lamborghini Huracán GT3	963	(Switzerland) Mark Ineichen	A6 1 A6 2	1–2
(Austria) GRT Grasser Racing Team	Lamborghini Huracán GT3	963	(Netherlands) Rik Breukers	A6 1 A6 2	1
(Austria) GRT Grasser Racing Team	Lamborghini Huracán GT3	963	(Switzerland) Mauro Calamia	A6 1 A6 2	1
(Austria) GRT Grasser Racing Team	Lamborghini Huracán GT3	963	(Switzerland) Christoph Lenz	A6 1 A6 2	1
(Austria) GRT Grasser Racing Team	Lamborghini Huracán GT3	963	(Italy) Roberto Pampanini	A6 1 A6 2	1
(Austria) GRT Grasser Racing Team	Lamborghini Huracán GT3	963	(Switzerland) Rolf Ineichen	A6 1 A6 2	2
(Austria) GRT Grasser Racing Team	Lamborghini Huracán GT3	963	(United Kingdom) Phil Keen	A6 1 A6 2	2
(Austria) GRT Grasser Racing Team	Lamborghini Huracán GT3	963	(France) Franck Perera	A6 1 A6 2	2
(Austria) GRT Grasser Racing Team	Lamborghini Huracán GT3	964	(Italy) Mirko Bortolotti	A6 1 A6 2	1
(Austria) GRT Grasser Racing Team	Lamborghini Huracán GT3	964	(Germany) Christian Engelhart	A6 1 A6 2	1
(Austria) GRT Grasser Racing Team	Lamborghini Huracán GT3	964	(Switzerland) Mark Ineichen	A6 1 A6 2	1
(Austria) GRT Grasser Racing Team	Lamborghini Huracán GT3	964	(Switzerland) Rolf Ineichen	A6 1 A6 2	1
(Austria) GRT Grasser Racing Team	Lamborghini Huracán GT3	964	(Netherlands) Rik Breukers	A6 1 A6 2	2
(Austria) GRT Grasser Racing Team	Lamborghini Huracán GT3	964	(Switzerland) Mauro Calamia	A6 1 A6 2	2
(Austria) GRT Grasser Racing Team	Lamborghini Huracán GT3	964	(Switzerland) Christoph Lenz	A6 1 A6 2	2
(Austria) GRT Grasser Racing Team	Lamborghini Huracán GT3	964	(Italy) Roberto Pampanini	A6 1 A6 2	2
Gulf Racing Japan	Porsche 991 GT3 R	991	(Japan) Hisashi Kunie	A6	1
Gulf Racing Japan	Porsche 991 GT3 R	991	(Canada) Bashar Mardini	A6	1
Gulf Racing Japan	Porsche 991 GT3 R	991	(Belgium) Nicolas Saelens	A6	1
Gulf Racing Japan	Porsche 991 GT3 R	991	(Austria) Philipp Sager	A6	1
Gulf Racing Japan	Porsche 991 GT3 R	991	(Japan) Kimihiro Yashiro	A6	1
SP4
Team	Car	No.	Drivers	Rounds	
(Germany) Manthey Racing	Porsche 991 GT3 R (2019)	912	(Germany) Jürgen Häring	7	
(Germany) Manthey Racing	Porsche 991 GT3 R (2019)	912	(Germany) Sven Müller	7	
(Germany) Manthey Racing	Porsche 991 GT3 R (2019)	912	(Germany) Edward Lewis Brauner	7	
SPX
Team	Car	No.	Drivers	Rounds	
(Germany) Leipert Motorsport	Lamborghini Huracán Super Trofeo	10	(Singapore) Keong Wee Lim	1	
(Germany) Leipert Motorsport	Lamborghini Huracán Super Trofeo	10	(Malaysia) Melvin Moh	1	
(Germany) Leipert Motorsport	Lamborghini Huracán Super Trofeo	10	(Norway) Aleksander Schjerpen	1	
(Germany) Leipert Motorsport	Lamborghini Huracán Super Trofeo	10	(Lithuania) Tadas Volbikas	1	
(Germany) Leipert Motorsport	Lamborghini Huracán Super Trofeo	10	(United Kingdom) Oliver Webb	1	
(Germany) Leipert Motorsport	Lamborghini Huracán Super Trofeo	10	(Romania) Petru Umbrărescu	5	
(Germany) Leipert Motorsport	Lamborghini Huracán Super Trofeo	10	(Italy) Gabriele Piana	5	
(Germany) Leipert Motorsport	Lamborghini Huracán Super Trofeo	10	(Germany) John-Louis Jasper	5	
(Germany) Leipert Motorsport	Lamborghini Huracán Super Trofeo	10	(Bulgaria) Pavel Lefterov	5	
(Germany) Leipert Motorsport	Lamborghini Huracán Super Trofeo Evo	10	(Australia) Morgan Haber	6	
(Germany) Leipert Motorsport	Lamborghini Huracán Super Trofeo Evo	10	(Belgium) Anthony Lambert	6	
(Germany) Leipert Motorsport	Lamborghini Huracán Super Trofeo Evo	10	(Norway) Marcus Påverud	6	
(Germany) Leipert Motorsport	Lamborghini Huracán Super Trofeo Evo	10	(Germany) Harald Schlotter	6	
(Ukraine) Tsunami R.T.	Porsche 991 GT3 Cup MR	37	(Ukraine) Oleksandr Gaidai	1	
(Ukraine) Tsunami R.T.	Porsche 991 GT3 Cup MR	37	(Ukraine) Andrii Kruglyk	1	
(Ukraine) Tsunami R.T.	Porsche 991 GT3 Cup MR	37	(France) Côme Ledogar	1	
(Ukraine) Tsunami R.T.	Porsche 991 GT3 Cup MR	37	(Italy) Alessio Rovera	1	
(United Kingdom) Fox Motorsport	Audi R8 LMS GT	47	(United Kingdom) Ben Clucas	2	
(United Kingdom) Fox Motorsport	Audi R8 LMS GT	47	(United Kingdom) Glenn Sherwood	2	
(United Kingdom) Fox Motorsport	Audi R8 LMS GT	47	(United Kingdom) Jamie Stanley	2	
MARC Cars Australia	MARC II V8	51	(Australia) Jake Camilleri	7	
MARC Cars Australia	MARC II V8	51	(Australia) Keith Kassulke	7	
MARC Cars Australia	MARC II V8	51	(Australia) Hadrian Morrall	7	
(Belgium) VDS Racing Adventures	MARC Focus V8 6 MARC II V8 7	58	(Belgium) Raphaël van der Straten	5-7	
(Belgium) VDS Racing Adventures	MARC Focus V8 6 MARC II V8 7	58	(Belgium) José Close	5-7	
(Belgium) VDS Racing Adventures	MARC Focus V8 6 MARC II V8 7	58	(Belgium) Joel Vanloocke	5-7	
(Belgium) VDS Racing Adventures	MARC Focus V8 6 MARC II V8 7	58	(Germany) Wolfgang Haugg	6	
(Belgium) VDS Racing Adventures	MARC Focus V8 6 MARC II V8 7	58	(France) Bernard Salam	6	
(San Marino) GDL Racing (Note: Car No. 77 entered as GDL Racing and car No. 87 entered as GDL Racing Middle East.) (Singapore) GDL Racing Team Asia (Note: Car No. 77 entered as GDL Racing Team Asia, under Singapore flag, in Round 1.) (United Arab Emirates) GDL Racing Middle East	Lamborghini Huracán Super Trofeo	77	(Hong Kong) Nigel Farmer	1	
(San Marino) GDL Racing (Singapore) GDL Racing Team Asia (United Arab Emirates) GDL Racing Middle East	Lamborghini Huracán Super Trofeo	77	(Singapore) Keong Liam Lim	1	
(San Marino) GDL Racing (Singapore) GDL Racing Team Asia (United Arab Emirates) GDL Racing Middle East	Lamborghini Huracán Super Trofeo	77	(Singapore) Gerald Tan	1	
(San Marino) GDL Racing (Singapore) GDL Racing Team Asia (United Arab Emirates) GDL Racing Middle East	Lamborghini Huracán Super Trofeo	77	(Netherlands) Richard Verburg	1	
(San Marino) GDL Racing (Singapore) GDL Racing Team Asia (United Arab Emirates) GDL Racing Middle East	Lamborghini Huracán Super Trofeo	77	(Greece) Dimitris Deverikos	4	
(San Marino) GDL Racing (Singapore) GDL Racing Team Asia (United Arab Emirates) GDL Racing Middle East	Lamborghini Huracán Super Trofeo	77	(Italy) Gianluca de Lorenzi	4	
(San Marino) GDL Racing (Singapore) GDL Racing Team Asia (United Arab Emirates) GDL Racing Middle East	Lamborghini Huracán Super Trofeo	77	(Argentina) Andres Josephsohn	4	
(San Marino) GDL Racing (Singapore) GDL Racing Team Asia (United Arab Emirates) GDL Racing Middle East	Lamborghini Huracán Super Trofeo	87	(France) Franck Pelle	1	
(San Marino) GDL Racing (Singapore) GDL Racing Team Asia (United Arab Emirates) GDL Racing Middle East	Lamborghini Huracán Super Trofeo	87	(Finland) Rory Penttinen	1	
(San Marino) GDL Racing (Singapore) GDL Racing Team Asia (United Arab Emirates) GDL Racing Middle East	Lamborghini Huracán Super Trofeo	87	(United States) Vic Rice	1	
(San Marino) GDL Racing (Singapore) GDL Racing Team Asia (United Arab Emirates) GDL Racing Middle East	Lamborghini Huracán Super Trofeo	87	(Italy) Massimo Vignali	1	
(Belgium) Speed Lover (Note: Car No. 78 entered with a Porsche 991 GT3 Cup MR in Round 2.)	Porsche 991 (Speed Lover)	78	(United States) Dominique Bastien	2, 4-5, 7	
(Belgium) Speed Lover	Porsche 991 (Speed Lover)	78	(United States) Phillippe Denes	2	
(Belgium) Speed Lover	Porsche 991 (Speed Lover)	78	(Belgium) Pierre-Yves Paque	4-5	
(Belgium) Speed Lover	Porsche 991 (Speed Lover)	78	(Belgium) Wim Meulders	5	
(Belgium) Speed Lover	Porsche 991 (Speed Lover)	78	(Spain) Jaime Carbo Fernandez	7	
(Belgium) Speed Lover	Porsche 991 (Speed Lover)	78	(Luxembourg) Bob Wilwert	7	
(Belgium) Speed Lover	Porsche 991 (Speed Lover)	88	(France) Daniel Desbruères	1	
(Belgium) Speed Lover	Porsche 991 (Speed Lover)	88	(Belgium) Jean-Michel Gerome	1	
(Belgium) Speed Lover	Porsche 991 (Speed Lover)	88	(Luxembourg) Christian Kelders	1	
(Belgium) Speed Lover	Porsche 991 (Speed Lover)	88	(Belgium) Pierre-Yves Paque	1	
(United Kingdom) Slidesports Pallex	Porsche 991 GT3 Cup (SPX)	83	(United Kingdom) Nigel Armstrong	4	
(United Kingdom) Slidesports Pallex	Porsche 991 GT3 Cup (SPX)	83	(United Kingdom) Dave Fairbrother	4	
(United Kingdom) Slidesports Pallex	Porsche 991 GT3 Cup (SPX)	83	(United Kingdom) Steven Liquorish	4	
(United Kingdom) Slidesports Pallex	Porsche 991 GT3 Cup (SPX)	83	(United Kingdom) Adam Morgan	4	
(Germany) MRS GT-Racing	Porsche 991 GT3 Cup (SPX)	89	(Germany) Georg Bernsteiner	1	
(Germany) MRS GT-Racing	Porsche 991 GT3 Cup (SPX)	89	(Germany) Altfrid Heger	1	
(Germany) MRS GT-Racing	Porsche 991 GT3 Cup (SPX)	89	(Germany) Helmut Rödig	1	
(Germany) MRS GT-Racing	Porsche 991 GT3 Cup (SPX)	89	(Austria) Christopher Zöchling	1	
(Austria) True-Racing	KTM X-Bow GT4	116	(Austria) Klaus Angerhofer	3, 6	
(Austria) True-Racing	KTM X-Bow GT4	116	(Austria) Reinhard Kofler	3, 6	
(Austria) True-Racing	KTM X-Bow GT4	116	(Austria) Ferdinand Stuck	3	
(Austria) True-Racing	KTM X-Bow GT4	116	(Austria) Johannes Stuck	3	
(Austria) True-Racing	KTM X-Bow GT4	116	(Austria) Eike Angermayr	6	
(Austria) True-Racing	KTM X-Bow GT4	116	(Austria) Laura Kraihamer	6	
(Austria) True-Racing	KTM X-Bow GT4	116	(South Africa) Naomi Schiff	6	
(Austria) True-Racing	KTM X-Bow GT4	117	(Austria) Gerald Kiska	3, 6	
(Austria) True-Racing	KTM X-Bow GT4	117	(Austria) Reinhard Kofler	3, 6	
(Austria) True-Racing	KTM X-Bow GT4	117	(Austria) Hubert Trunkenpolz	3, 6	
(Austria) True-Racing	KTM X-Bow GT4	117	(Austria) Klaus Angerhofer	3	
(Austria) True-Racing	KTM X-Bow GT4	117	(Greece) "Takis"	3	
(Austria) True-Racing	KTM X-Bow GT4	117	(Poland) Artur Chwist	6	
(Austria) True-Racing	KTM X-Bow GT4	117	(Austria) Sehdi Sarmini	6	
(France) Vortex V8	Vortex 1.0	204	(France) Lionel Amrouche	3	
(France) Vortex V8	Vortex 1.0	204	(France) Philippe Gruau	3	
(France) Vortex V8	Vortex 1.0	204	(France) Philippe Valenza	3	
(France) Vortex V8	Vortex 1.0	204	(France) Julien Boillot	6	
(France) Vortex V8	Vortex 1.0	204	(France) Philippe Burel	6	
(France) Vortex V8	Vortex 1.0	204	(France) Stephane Cottrell	6	
(France) Vortex V8	Vortex 1.0	204	(Portugal) Victor Fernandes	6	
(Belgium) Qvick-VR Racing	MARC II V8	209	(Belgium) Erik Qvick	7	
(Belgium) Qvick-VR Racing	MARC II V8	209	(Belgium) John Rasse	7	
(Belgium) Qvick-VR Racing	MARC II V8	209	(Belgium) Tom van Rompuy	7	
(Czech Republic) RTR Projects	KTM X-Bow GT4 (SP2)	224	(Czech Republic) Karel Bednar	7	
(Czech Republic) RTR Projects	KTM X-Bow GT4 (SP2)	224	(Czech Republic) Erik Janiš	7	
(Czech Republic) RTR Projects	KTM X-Bow GT4 (SP2)	224	(Czech Republic) Jan Krabec	7	
(Czech Republic) RTR Projects	KTM X-Bow GT4 (SP2)	224	(Czech Republic) Tomas Kwolek	7	
(Czech Republic) RTR Projects	KTM X-Bow GT4 (SP2)	224	(Czech Republic) Tomas Miniberger	7	
(Germany) Manthey Racing	Porsche 991 GT3 R (2019)	912	(Germany) Ralf Bohn	5	
(Germany) Manthey Racing	Porsche 991 GT3 R (2019)	912	(France) Mathieu Jaminet	5	
(Germany) Manthey Racing	Porsche 991 GT3 R (2019)	912	(Germany) Alfred Renauer	5	
(Germany) Manthey Racing	Porsche 991 GT3 R (2019)	912	(Germany) Robert Renauer	5	
991
Team	Car	No.	Drivers	Class	Rounds
(Germany) MRS GT-Racing	Porsche 991 GT3 Cup	26	(Australia) Stephen Grove	911	1
(Germany) MRS GT-Racing	Porsche 991 GT3 Cup	26	(Germany) Bertram Hornung	911	1
(Germany) MRS GT-Racing	Porsche 991 GT3 Cup	26	(Germany) Matthias Jeserich	911	1
(Germany) MRS GT-Racing	Porsche 991 GT3 Cup	26	(Belgium) Glenn Van Parijs	911	1
(Germany) MRS GT-Racing	Porsche 991 GT3 Cup	90	(France) Olivier Baharian	911	1
(Germany) MRS GT-Racing	Porsche 991 GT3 Cup	90	(France) Thierry Blaise	911	1
(Germany) MRS GT-Racing	Porsche 991 GT3 Cup	90	(Switzerland) Manuel Nicolaidis	911	1
(Germany) MRS GT-Racing	Porsche 991 GT3 Cup	90	(United States) Alex Welch	911	1
(France) B2F compétition	Porsche 991 GT3 Cup	35	(France) Benoît Fretin	911	4
(France) B2F compétition	Porsche 991 GT3 Cup	35	(France) Bruno Fretin	911	4
(Netherlands) Van Berlo Racing	Porsche 991 GT3 Cup	56	(Netherlands) Kay van Berlo	911	4, 7
(Netherlands) Van Berlo Racing	Porsche 991 GT3 Cup	56	(Netherlands) Marcel van Berlo	911	4, 7
(Netherlands) Van Berlo Racing	Porsche 991 GT3 Cup	56	(Netherlands) Glenn van Berlo	911	7
(Switzerland) FACH AUTO TECH	Porsche 991 GT3 Cup	61	(Switzerland) Heinz Bruder	911	1
(Switzerland) FACH AUTO TECH	Porsche 991 GT3 Cup	61	(Switzerland) Philipp Frommenwiler	911	1
(Switzerland) FACH AUTO TECH	Porsche 991 GT3 Cup	61	(Switzerland) Peter Hegglin	911	1
(Switzerland) FACH AUTO TECH	Porsche 991 GT3 Cup	61	(Switzerland) Michael Hirschmann	911	1
(Switzerland) FACH AUTO TECH	Porsche 991 GT3 Cup	61	(Switzerland) Marcel Wagner	911	1
(Switzerland) FACH AUTO TECH	Porsche 991 GT3 Cup	62	(France) Julien Andlauer	911	1
(Switzerland) FACH AUTO TECH	Porsche 991 GT3 Cup	62	(Australia) Matt Campbell	911	1
(Switzerland) FACH AUTO TECH	Porsche 991 GT3 Cup	62	(Austria) Thomas Preining	911	1
(Switzerland) FACH AUTO TECH	Porsche 991 GT3 Cup	62	(Germany) Jens Richter	911	1
(Germany) race:pro motorsport	Porsche 991 GT3 Cup	63	(Austria) Klaus Bachler	911	1
(Germany) race:pro motorsport	Porsche 991 GT3 Cup	63	(Australia) Nick Foster	911	1
(Germany) race:pro motorsport	Porsche 991 GT3 Cup	63	(Germany) David Jahn	911	1
(Germany) race:pro motorsport	Porsche 991 GT3 Cup	63	(Russia) Stanislav Minsky	911	1
(Germany) race:pro motorsport	Porsche 991 GT3 Cup	63	(Germany) Murad Sultanov	911	1
(Germany) race:pro motorsport	Porsche 991 GT3 Cup	67	(Italy) Claudio Cappelli	911	1
(Germany) race:pro motorsport	Porsche 991 GT3 Cup	67	(Republic of Ireland) Sean McInerney	911	1
(Germany) race:pro motorsport	Porsche 991 GT3 Cup	67	(United Kingdom) Phil Quaife	911	1
(Germany) race:pro motorsport	Porsche 991 GT3 Cup	67	(United Kingdom) James Thorpe	911	1
(France) Porsche Lorient Racing	Porsche 991 GT3 Cup	64	(France) Pascal Gibon	911	2–4, 6–7
(France) Porsche Lorient Racing	Porsche 991 GT3 Cup	64	(France) Frédéric Lelièvre	911	2–4, 7
(France) Porsche Lorient Racing	Porsche 991 GT3 Cup	64	(France) Philippe Polette	911	2–4, 7
(France) Porsche Lorient Racing	Porsche 991 GT3 Cup	64	(France) Mathieu Pontais	911	2, 4
(France) Porsche Lorient Racing	Porsche 991 GT3 Cup	64	(France) Lionel Amrouche	911	6–7
(France) Porsche Lorient Racing	Porsche 991 GT3 Cup	64	(France) Frédéric Ancel	911	6
(France) Porsche Lorient Racing	Porsche 991 GT3 Cup	65	(France) Frédéric Ancel	911	2–4, 7
(France) Porsche Lorient Racing	Porsche 991 GT3 Cup	65	(France) Gilles Blasco	911	2–4, 6–7
(France) Porsche Lorient Racing	Porsche 991 GT3 Cup	65	(France) Alain Demorge	911	2–4, 6–7
(France) Porsche Lorient Racing	Porsche 991 GT3 Cup	65	(France) Jean-François Demorge	911	2–4, 6–7
(France) Porsche Lorient Racing	Porsche 991 GT3 Cup	65	(France) Lionel Amrouche	911	4
(France) Porsche Lorient Racing	Porsche 991 GT3 Cup	65	(France) Mathieu Pontais	911	6
(Germany) MSG HRT Motorsport	Porsche 991 GT3 Cup	69	(Germany) Holger Harmsen	911	1
(Germany) MSG HRT Motorsport	Porsche 991 GT3 Cup	69	(Germany) Kim André Hauschild	911	1
(Germany) MSG HRT Motorsport	Porsche 991 GT3 Cup	69	(Russia) Stepan Krumilov	911	1
(Germany) MSG HRT Motorsport	Porsche 991 GT3 Cup	69	(Russia) Andrey Mukovoz	911	1
(Germany) MSG HRT Motorsport	Porsche 991 GT3 Cup	69	(Russia) Stanislav Sidoruk	911	1
(Italy) Ebimotors	Porsche 991 GT3 Cup	73	(Italy) Carlo Curti	911	3–7
(Italy) Ebimotors	Porsche 991 GT3 Cup	73	(Italy) Lino Curti	911	3–7
(Italy) Ebimotors	Porsche 991 GT3 Cup	73	(Italy) Marco Frezza	911	3–7
(Italy) Ebimotors	Porsche 991 GT3 Cup	73	(Italy) Federico Curti	911	5–6
(United States) JDX Racing	Porsche 991 GT3 Cup	74	(United States) David Baker	911	8
(United States) JDX Racing	Porsche 991 GT3 Cup	74	(United States) Trenton Estep	911	8
(United States) JDX Racing	Porsche 991 GT3 Cup	74	(United States) Mark Kvamme	911	8
(United States) JDX Racing	Porsche 991 GT3 Cup	74	(United States) Alan Metni	911	8
(France) IDEC SPORT RACING	Porsche 991 GT3 Cup	75	(France) David Abramczyk	911	2–6
(France) IDEC SPORT RACING	Porsche 991 GT3 Cup	75	(France) Romain Vozniak	911	2–6
(France) IDEC SPORT RACING	Porsche 991 GT3 Cup	75	(France) Stéphane Adler	911	2, 4-6
(France) IDEC SPORT RACING	Porsche 991 GT3 Cup	75	(France) Michael Blanchemain	911	2
(France) IDEC SPORT RACING	Porsche 991 GT3 Cup	75	(France) Paul Lafargue	911	3
(France) IDEC SPORT RACING	Porsche 991 GT3 Cup	75	(France) Florent Jimenez	911	5
(France) IDEC SPORT RACING	Porsche 991 GT3 Cup	75	(France) Lionel Amrouche	911	5
(France) IDEC SPORT RACING	Porsche 991 GT3 Cup	75	(France) Christophe Cresp	911	6
(France) IDEC SPORT RACING	Porsche 991 GT3 Cup	75	(France) Franck Mechaly	911	6
(Belgium) Speed Lover	Porsche 991 GT3 Cup	79	(Netherlands) Marcel van Berlo	911	1
(Belgium) Speed Lover	Porsche 991 GT3 Cup	79	(Netherlands) Bob Herber	911	1
(Belgium) Speed Lover	Porsche 991 GT3 Cup	79	(Netherlands) Harry Hilders	911	1
(Belgium) Speed Lover	Porsche 991 GT3 Cup	79	(Netherlands) Daan Meijer	911	1
(Belgium) Speed Lover	Porsche 991 GT3 Cup	88	(Germany) Kim André Hauschild	911	4
(Belgium) Speed Lover	Porsche 991 GT3 Cup	88	(Russia) Andrey Mukovoz	911	4
(Belgium) Speed Lover	Porsche 991 GT3 Cup	88	(Russia) Sergey Peregudov	911	4
(Belgium) Speed Lover	Porsche 991 GT3 Cup	88	(Russia) Stanislav Sidoruk	911	4
(Germany) Huber Motorsport	Porsche 991 GT3 Cup	81	(Liechtenstein) Peter Kieber	911	3
(Germany) Huber Motorsport	Porsche 991 GT3 Cup	81	(Germany) Thomas König	911	3
(Germany) Huber Motorsport	Porsche 991 GT3 Cup	81	(Switzerland) Adrian Spescha	911	3
(Russia) RScar Motorsport	Porsche 991 GT3 Cup	82	(Russia) Denis Gromov	911	1
(Russia) RScar Motorsport	Porsche 991 GT3 Cup	82	(Russia) Vadim Meshcheriakov	911	1
(Russia) RScar Motorsport	Porsche 991 GT3 Cup	82	(Russia) Roman Rusinov	911	1
(Russia) RScar Motorsport	Porsche 991 GT3 Cup	82	(Russia) Artem Soloviev	911	1
(United States) Wright Motorsports	Porsche 991 GT3 Cup	91	(Belgium) Jan Heylen	911	8
(United States) Wright Motorsports	Porsche 991 GT3 Cup	91	(United States) Anthony Imperato	911	8
(United States) Wright Motorsports	Porsche 991 GT3 Cup	91	(United States) Fred Poordad	911	8
(United States) Wright Motorsports	Porsche 991 GT3 Cup	91	(United States) Mckay Snow	911	8
(Germany) Allied Racing	Porsche 991 GT3 Cup	93	(Germany) Jan Kasperlik	911	4
(Germany) Allied Racing	Porsche 991 GT3 Cup	93	(Hungary) Csaba Mor	911	4
(Germany) Allied Racing	Porsche 991 GT3 Cup	93	(Germany) Hendrik Still	911	4
(Belgium) QSR Racingschool	Porsche 991 GT3 Cup	94	(Belgium) Rodrigue Gillion	911	3–7
(Belgium) QSR Racingschool	Porsche 991 GT3 Cup	94	(Sweden) Tommy Gråberg	911	3–5, 7
(Belgium) QSR Racingschool	Porsche 991 GT3 Cup	94	(Sweden) Hans Holmlund	911	3–5
(Belgium) QSR Racingschool	Porsche 991 GT3 Cup	94	(Sweden) Gustav Bard	911	5
(Belgium) QSR Racingschool	Porsche 991 GT3 Cup	94	(United States) John Mauro	911	6
(Belgium) QSR Racingschool	Porsche 991 GT3 Cup	94	(United States) Jim Briody	911	6
(Belgium) QSR Racingschool	Porsche 991 GT3 Cup	94	(United Kingdom) Gavin Pickering	911	6
(Belgium) QSR Racingschool	Porsche 991 GT3 Cup	94	(United Kingdom) Ricky Coomber	911	6
(Belgium) QSR Racingschool	Porsche 991 GT3 Cup	94	(Belgium) Nico Verdonck	911	7
(Belgium) QSR Racingschool	Porsche 991 GT3 Cup	94	(Belgium) Raf van Belle	911	7
(United Kingdom) Duel Racing	Porsche 991 GT3 Cup	95	(Lebanon) Nabil Moutran	911	1
(United Kingdom) Duel Racing	Porsche 991 GT3 Cup	95	(Lebanon) Ramzi Moutran	911	1
(United Kingdom) Duel Racing	Porsche 991 GT3 Cup	95	(Lebanon) Sami Moutran	911	1
(United Kingdom) Duel Racing	Porsche 991 GT3 Cup	95	(United Kingdom) Jules Westwood	911	1
(United Kingdom) track-club	Porsche 991 GT3 Cup	111	(United Kingdom) Adam Balon	911	1–2, 5
(United Kingdom) track-club	Porsche 991 GT3 Cup	111	(United Kingdom) Marcus Jewell	911	1–2, 5
(United Kingdom) track-club	Porsche 991 GT3 Cup	111	(United Kingdom) Andrew Gordon-Colebrooke	911	1
(United Kingdom) track-club	Porsche 991 GT3 Cup	111	(United Kingdom) Ryan Ratcliffe	911	1
(United Kingdom) track-club	Porsche 991 GT3 Cup	111	(United Kingdom) Stuart Ratcliff	911	2
(United Kingdom) track-club	Porsche 991 GT3 Cup	111	(United Kingdom) Adam Knight	911	5
(United Kingdom) track-club	Porsche 991 GT3 Cup	111	(United Kingdom) Liam Griffin	911	5
(United Kingdom) track-club	Porsche 991 GT3 Cup	111	(United Kingdom) Ian Loggie	911	5
(United Arab Emirates) (Germany) Raceunion (Note: Car No. 187 entered under United Arab Emirates flag in Round 1.)	Porsche 991 GT3 Cup	187	(Germany) Alex Autumn	911	1, 4
(United Arab Emirates) (Germany) Raceunion	Porsche 991 GT3 Cup	187	(Germany) Felipe Fernández Laser	911	1, 4
(United Arab Emirates) (Germany) Raceunion	Porsche 991 GT3 Cup	187	(Germany) Andreas Gülden	911	1, 4
(United Arab Emirates) (Germany) Raceunion	Porsche 991 GT3 Cup	187	(Sweden) Henric Skoog	911	1
(United Arab Emirates) (Germany) Raceunion	Porsche 991 GT3 Cup	187	(Germany) Wolfgang Triller	911	1
(Poland) Förch Racing	Porsche 991 GT3 Cup	189	(Germany) Patrick Eisemann	911	5
(Poland) Förch Racing	Porsche 991 GT3 Cup	189	(Germany) Stefan Oschmann	911	5
(Poland) Förch Racing	Porsche 991 GT3 Cup	189	(Germany) Christopher Bauer	911	5
(Poland) Förch Racing	Porsche 991 GT3 Cup	189	(Poland) Robert Lukas	911	5
SP2
Team	Car	No.	Drivers	Rounds	
(Belgium) VDS Racing Adventures	MARC Focus V8	58	(Belgium) José Close	1, 3–4, 8	
(Belgium) VDS Racing Adventures	MARC Focus V8	58	(Belgium) Raphaël van der Straten	1, 3–4, 8	
(Belgium) VDS Racing Adventures	MARC Focus V8	58	(Germany) Karim Al Azhari	1	
(Belgium) VDS Racing Adventures	MARC Focus V8	58	(Germany) Wolfgang Haugg	1	
(Belgium) VDS Racing Adventures	MARC Focus V8	58	(Belgium) Grégory Paisse	1, 4	
(Belgium) VDS Racing Adventures	MARC Focus V8	58	(Belgium) Nico Verdonck	8	
(Belgium) VDS Racing Adventures	MARC Focus V8	58	(Luxembourg) Hary Putz	8	
(Belgium) VDS Racing Adventures	MARC Focus V8	58	(Luxembourg) Paul Stoffel	8	
(France) LAMERA-CUP	Lamera Cup	60	(France) Pierre Couasnon	1, 8	
(France) LAMERA-CUP	Lamera Cup	60	(France) Philippe Marie	1, 8	
(France) LAMERA-CUP	Lamera Cup	60	(France) Wilfried Merafina	1, 8	
(France) LAMERA-CUP	Lamera Cup	60	(France) Christophe Bouchut	1, 8	
(Belgium) Speed Lover	Porsche 991 GT3 Cup (SP2)	78	(United States) Dominique Bastien	1	
(Belgium) Speed Lover	Porsche 991 GT3 Cup (SP2)	78	(Spain) Jesús Díez Villarroel	1	
(Belgium) Speed Lover	Porsche 991 GT3 Cup (SP2)	78	(Luxembourg) Carlos Rivas	1	
(Belgium) Speed Lover	Porsche 991 GT3 Cup (SP2)	78	(Luxembourg) Bob Wilwert	1	
(Belgium) Speed Lover	Porsche 991 GT3 Cup (SP2)	78	(Belgium) Pierre-Yves Paque	8	
(Belgium) Speed Lover	Porsche 991 GT3 Cup (SP2)	78	(Belgium) Rodrigue Gillion	8	
(Belgium) Speed Lover	Porsche 991 GT3 Cup (SP2)	78	(Belgium) Jean-Michel Gerome	8	
(Belgium) Speed Lover	Porsche 991 GT3 Cup (SP2)	78	(Belgium) Jean-Alexandre Gerome	8	
(Belgium) Speed Lover	Porsche 991 GT3 Cup (SP2)	78	(United States) Lance Bergstein	8	
(Netherlands) JR Motorsport	BMW M3 (F80) Endurance	114	(Netherlands) Martin Lanting	8	
(Netherlands) JR Motorsport	BMW M3 (F80) Endurance	114	(Netherlands) Bas Schouten	8	
(Netherlands) JR Motorsport	BMW M3 (F80) Endurance	114	(Netherlands) Ted Van Vliet	8	
(Netherlands) JR Motorsport	BMW M3 (F80) Endurance	114	(Belgium) Ward Sluys	8	
(Germany) CCS Racing	KTM X-Bow GT4 (SP2)	201	(Luxembourg) Charel Arendt	1	
(Germany) CCS Racing	KTM X-Bow GT4 (SP2)	201	(Austria) Holger Baumgartner	1	
(Germany) CCS Racing	KTM X-Bow GT4 (SP2)	201	(Luxembourg) Tom Kieffer	1	
(Germany) CCS Racing	KTM X-Bow GT4 (SP2)	201	(Germany) Uwe Schmidt	1	
KTM Motorsport Australia	KTM X-Bow GT4 (SP2)	246	(Netherlands) Peter Kox	1	
KTM Motorsport Australia	KTM X-Bow GT4 (SP2)	246	(Australia) Justin McMillan	1	
KTM Motorsport Australia	KTM X-Bow GT4 (SP2)	246	(Netherlands) Nico Pronk	1	
KTM Motorsport Australia	KTM X-Bow GT4 (SP2)	246	(Australia) Glen Wood	1	
GT4
Team	Car	No.	Drivers	Rounds	
(United Kingdom) Brookspeed International Motorsport	Porsche Cayman GT4 Clubsport MR	40	(United Kingdom) Ian James	1, 8	
(United Kingdom) Brookspeed International Motorsport	Porsche Cayman GT4 Clubsport MR	40	(United Kingdom) Matt Bell	1	
(United Kingdom) Brookspeed International Motorsport	Porsche Cayman GT4 Clubsport MR	40	(Brazil) Pierre Kleinubing	1	
(United Kingdom) Brookspeed International Motorsport	Porsche Cayman GT4 Clubsport MR	40	(United States) Jim McGuire	1	
(United Kingdom) Brookspeed International Motorsport	Porsche Cayman GT4 Clubsport MR	40	(United States) John Schauerman	1	
(United Kingdom) Brookspeed International Motorsport	Porsche Cayman GT4 Clubsport MR	40	(United States) Preston Calvert	8	
(United Kingdom) Brookspeed International Motorsport	Porsche Cayman GT4 Clubsport MR	40	(United States) Mathew Keegan	8	
(United Kingdom) Fox Motorsport	Audi R8 LMS GT4	47	(United Kingdom) Ben Clucas	5, 7	
(United Kingdom) Fox Motorsport	Audi R8 LMS GT4	47	(United Kingdom) Andrew Perry	5, 7	
(United Kingdom) Fox Motorsport	Audi R8 LMS GT4	47	(United Kingdom) Jamie Stanley	5, 7	
(United Kingdom) Fox Motorsport	Audi R8 LMS GT4	47	(United Kingdom) Glenn Sherwood	5	
(Germany) Team RACE SCOUT by Winward / HTP Motorsport	Mercedes-AMG GT4 R SPX	84	(United States) Bryce Ward	1, 8	
(Germany) Team RACE SCOUT by Winward / HTP Motorsport	Mercedes-AMG GT4 R SPX	84	(United States) Russell Ward	1, 8	
(Germany) Team RACE SCOUT by Winward / HTP Motorsport	Mercedes-AMG GT4 R SPX	84	(Argentina) Norberto Fontana	1	
(Germany) Team RACE SCOUT by Winward / HTP Motorsport	Mercedes-AMG GT4 R SPX	84	(Germany) Christian Gebhardt	1	
(Germany) Team RACE SCOUT by Winward / HTP Motorsport	Mercedes-AMG GT4 R SPX	84	(Germany) Bernd Schneider	1	
(Germany) Team RACE SCOUT by Winward / HTP Motorsport	Mercedes-AMG GT4 R SPX	84	(Netherlands) Indy Dontje	8	
(Germany) Team RACE SCOUT by Winward / HTP Motorsport	Mercedes-AMG GT4 R SPX	84	(Germany) Christian Hohenadel	8	
(United States) RHC-Lawrence/Storm; MARC Cars Australia	BMW M4 GT4	113	(United States) Daren Jorgensen	8	
(United States) RHC-Lawrence/Storm; MARC Cars Australia	BMW M4 GT4	113	(Australia) Gerard McLeod	8	
(United States) RHC-Lawrence/Storm; MARC Cars Australia	BMW M4 GT4	113	(United States) Brett Strom	8	
(United States) RHC-Lawrence/Storm; MARC Cars Australia	BMW M4 GT4	113	(Netherlands) Danny van Dongen	8	
(United States) RHC-Lawrence/Storm; MARC Cars Australia	BMW M4 GT4	250	(United States) Daren Jorgensen	7	
(United States) RHC-Lawrence/Storm; MARC Cars Australia	BMW M4 GT4	250	(United States) Jon Miller	7	
(United States) RHC-Lawrence/Storm; MARC Cars Australia	BMW M4 GT4	250	(United States) Brett Strom	7	
(Spain) NM Racing Team	Ginetta G55 GT4	215	(Russia) Nikolay Dmitriev	6	
(Spain) NM Racing Team	Ginetta G55 GT4	215	(France) Maxime Guillemat	6	
(Spain) NM Racing Team	Ginetta G55 GT4	215	(Spain) Lluc Ibáñez	6	
(Spain) NM Racing Team	Ginetta G55 GT4	215	(Spain) Max Llobet	6	
(Spain) NM Racing Team	Ginetta G55 GT4	215	(Spain) Xavier Lloveras	6	
(Italy) Nova Race	Ginetta G55 GT4	227	(Italy) Matteo Cressoni	6	
(Italy) Nova Race	Ginetta G55 GT4	227	(Italy) Luca Magnoni	6	
(Italy) Nova Race	Ginetta G55 GT4	227	(Italy) Enrico Garbelli	6	
(Italy) Nova Race	Ginetta G55 GT4	227	(Finland) Henri Kauppi	6	
(Germany) Besagroup Racing	Mercedes-AMG GT4 R SPX	233	(Germany) Roland Asch	1	
(Germany) Besagroup Racing	Mercedes-AMG GT4 R SPX	233	(Germany) Sebastian Asch	1	
(Germany) Besagroup Racing	Mercedes-AMG GT4 R SPX	233	(Croatia) Franjo Kovac	1	
(Germany) Besagroup Racing	Mercedes-AMG GT4 R SPX	233	(Germany) Fidel Leib	1	
(Germany) Besagroup Racing	Mercedes-AMG GT4 R SPX	233	(Germany) Cora Schumacher	1	
(Denmark) Perfection Racing Europe	Ginetta G55 GT4	239	(Denmark) Claus Klostermann	1, 5, 8	
(Denmark) Perfection Racing Europe	Ginetta G55 GT4	239	(Denmark) Michael Klostermann	1, 5, 8	
(Denmark) Perfection Racing Europe	Ginetta G55 GT4	239	(Denmark) Tommy Laugesen	1, 5, 8	
(Denmark) Perfection Racing Europe	Ginetta G55 GT4	239	(Denmark) René Rasmussen	1, 5, 8	
(Sweden) ALFAB Racing	McLaren 570S GT4	241	(Sweden) Erik Behrens	1	
(Sweden) ALFAB Racing	McLaren 570S GT4	241	(Sweden) Anders Levin	1	
(Sweden) ALFAB Racing	McLaren 570S GT4	241	(Sweden) Daniel Roos	1	
(Sweden) ALFAB Racing	McLaren 570S GT4	241	(Sweden) Fredrik Ros	1	
(Germany) Phoenix Racing	Audi R8 LMS GT4	247	(Hong Kong) Adderly Fong	1	
(Germany) Phoenix Racing	Audi R8 LMS GT4	247	(Hong Kong) Charles Kwan	1	
(Germany) Phoenix Racing	Audi R8 LMS GT4	247	(Hong Kong) Marchy Lee	1	
(Germany) Phoenix Racing	Audi R8 LMS GT4	247	(Hong Kong) Darryl O'Young	1	
(Germany) Phoenix Racing	Audi R8 LMS GT4	247	(Hong Kong) Shaun Thong	1	
(Germany) Phoenix Racing	Audi R8 LMS GT4	248	(United Kingdom) Philip Ellis	1	
(Germany) Phoenix Racing	Audi R8 LMS GT4	248	(Germany) John-Louis Jasper	1	
(Germany) Phoenix Racing	Audi R8 LMS GT4	248	(Finland) Joonas Lappalainen	1	
(Germany) Phoenix Racing	Audi R8 LMS GT4	248	(Poland) Gosia Rdest	1	
(Germany) Sorg Rennsport	BMW M4 GT4	252	(United States) John Allen	1	
(Germany) Sorg Rennsport	BMW M4 GT4	252	(Germany) Stefan Aust	1	
(Germany) Sorg Rennsport	BMW M4 GT4	252	(Netherlands) Max Braams	1	
(Germany) Sorg Rennsport	BMW M4 GT4	252	(Germany) Henry Littig	1	
(Germany) Sorg Rennsport	BMW M4 GT4	252	(Germany) Olaf Meyer	1	
(Belgium) QSR Racingschool	Mercedes-AMG GT4 R SPX	254	(Belgium) Bert Redant	3–7	
(Belgium) QSR Racingschool	Mercedes-AMG GT4 R SPX	254	(Belgium) Mario Timmers	3–7	
(Belgium) QSR Racingschool	Mercedes-AMG GT4 R SPX	254	(Belgium) Michiel Verhaeren	3–7	
(Belgium) QSR Racingschool	Mercedes-AMG GT4 R SPX	254	(Belgium) Jimmy de Breucker	4–7	
(Belgium) QSR Racingschool	Mercedes-AMG GT4 R SPX	254	(Germany) Hubert Haupt	6	
(Belgium) Gamsiz motorsport	BMW M4 GT4	256	(Belgium) Hakan Sari	7	
(Belgium) Gamsiz motorsport	BMW M4 GT4	256	(Belgium) Recep Sari	7	
(Germany) Allied Racing	Porsche Cayman GT4 Clubsport MR Evo 2018	263	(Germany) Jan Kasperlik	4	
(Germany) Allied Racing	Porsche Cayman GT4 Clubsport MR Evo 2018	263	(Germany) Dominique Schaak	4	
(Germany) Allied Racing	Porsche Cayman GT4 Clubsport MR Evo 2018	263	(Switzerland) Detlef Schmidt	4	
(Germany) Allied Racing	Porsche Cayman GT4 Clubsport MR Evo 2018	263	(Austria) Nicolas Schöll	4	
(Germany) Allied Racing	Porsche Cayman GT4 Clubsport MR Evo 2018	263	(Germany) Hendrik Still	4	
(Germany) BLACK FALCON Team TMD Friction	Mercedes-AMG GT4 R SPX	264	(Hong Kong) Antares Au	1	
(Germany) BLACK FALCON Team TMD Friction	Mercedes-AMG GT4 R SPX	264	(Hong Kong) Jonathan Hui	1	
(Germany) BLACK FALCON Team TMD Friction	Mercedes-AMG GT4 R SPX	264	(Macau) Kevin Tse	1	
(Germany) BLACK FALCON Team TMD Friction	Mercedes-AMG GT4 R SPX	264	(Hong Kong) Frank Yu	1	
(France) 3Y Technology	BMW M4 GT4	268	(France) Éric Cayrolle	1	
(France) 3Y Technology	BMW M4 GT4	268	(France) Philippe Chatelet	1	
(France) 3Y Technology	BMW M4 GT4	268	(France) Mickaël Petit	1	
(France) 3Y Technology	BMW M4 GT4	268	(France) Nils Stievenart	1	
(France) 3Y Technology	BMW M4 GT4	269	(France) Fabien Michal	1	
(France) 3Y Technology	BMW M4 GT4	269	(France) David Loger	1	
(France) 3Y Technology	BMW M4 GT4	269	(France) Eric Mouez	1	
(France) 3Y Technology	BMW M4 GT4	269	(France) Gregory Pain	1	
(United States) Classic BMW	BMW M4 GT4	272	(United States) Andrew Davis	8	
(United States) Classic BMW	BMW M4 GT4	272	(United States) Jason Hart	8	
(United States) Classic BMW	BMW M4 GT4	272	(United States) Curt Swearingin	8	
(United States) Classic BMW	BMW M4 GT4	272	(United States) Matt Travis	8	
(United States) Classic BMW	BMW M4 GT4	272	(United States) Mike Vess	8	
Endurance Team Romania	Ginetta G55 GT4	446	(Italy) Fabrizio Broggi	3, 6	
Endurance Team Romania	Ginetta G55 GT4	446	(Romania) Sergiu Nicolae	3, 6	
Endurance Team Romania	Ginetta G55 GT4	446	(United Kingdom) Mike Simpson	6	
(United States) RENNtech Motorsports	Mercedes-AMG GT4 R SPX	890	(United States) Paul Barnhart Jr	8	
(United States) RENNtech Motorsports	Mercedes-AMG GT4 R SPX	890	(United States) Chapman Ducote	8	
(United States) RENNtech Motorsports	Mercedes-AMG GT4 R SPX	890	(United States) David Ducote	8	
(United States) RENNtech Motorsports	Mercedes-AMG GT4 R SPX	890	(United States) Wayne Ducote	8	
(United States) RENNtech Motorsports	Mercedes-AMG GT4 R SPX	890	(Canada) Kyle Marcelli	8	

Icon	Class
A6	A6-Pro
A6	A6-Am
911	991-Pro
911	991-Am

== Race results ==
Bold indicates overall winner.

Classes	(United Arab Emirates) 24H Dubai (Round 1)	(United Kingdom) 12H Silverstone (Round 2)	(Spain) 12H Navarra (Round 3)	(Italy) 12H Imola (Round 4)	(Portugal) 24H Portimão (Round 5)	(Spain) 24H Barcelona (Round 6)	(Belgium) 12H Spa (Round 7)	(United States) 24H Austin (Round 8)
A6-Pro Winners	**(Germany) No. 2 Black Falcon**	**(United Kingdom) No. 31 ROFGO Racing**	**(Czech Republic) No. 11 Bohemia Energy racing** **with Scuderia Praha**	**(Germany) No. 911 Herberth Motorsport**	**(Czech Republic) No. 11 Bohemia Energy racing** **with Scuderia Praha**	**(Germany) No. 911 Herberth Motorsport**	**(Czech Republic) No. 11 Bohemia Energy racing** **with Scuderia Praha**	**(Germany) No. 3 Black Falcon**
A6-Pro Winners	**(Netherlands) Yelmer Buurman** **(Saudi Arabia) Abdulaziz Al Faisal** **(Germany) Hubert Haupt** **(Italy) Gabriele Piana**	**(United Kingdom) Daniel Brown** **(Germany) Roald Goethe** **(United Kingdom) Stuart Hall**	**(Czech Republic) Josef Král** **(Italy) Matteo Malucelli** **(Czech Republic) Jiří Písařík**	**(Switzerland) Daniel Allemann** **(Germany) Ralf Bohn** **(Germany) Alfred Renauer** **(Germany) Robert Renauer**	**(Czech Republic) Josef Král** **(Italy) Matteo Malucelli** **(Czech Republic) Jiří Písařík**	**(Switzerland) Daniel Allemann** **(Germany) Ralf Bohn** **(Australia) Matt Campbell** **(Germany) Alfred Renauer**	**(Czech Republic) Josef Král** **(Italy) Matteo Malucelli** **(Czech Republic) Jiří Písařík**	**(Netherlands) Yelmer Buurman** **(United States) Bret Curtis** **(United States) Scott Heckert** **(United States) Mike Skeen**
A6-Am Winners	(Germany) No. 16 SPS automotive performance	(Germany) No. 34 Car Collection Motorsport	(Germany) No. 34 Car Collection Motorsport	(Germany) No. 85 PROsport Performance	(Germany) No. 85 PROsport Performance	(Germany) No. 85 PROsport Performance	(Germany) No. 16 SPS automotive performance	(Germany) No. 85 PROsport Performance
A6-Am Winners	(Germany) Lance David Arnold (Austria) Dominik Baumann (Germany) Tim Müller (Germany) Valentin Pierburg	(Germany) Elmar Grimm (Germany) Johannes Kirchhoff (Germany) Ingo Vogler	(Germany) Gustav Edelhoff (Germany) Max Edelhoff (Germany) Elmar Grimm	(United States) Charles Espenlaub (United States) Joe Foster (United States) Charles Putman	(United Kingdom) Adam Christodoulou (United States) Charles Espenlaub (United States) Joe Foster (United States) Charles Putman	(United Kingdom) Adam Christodoulou (United States) Charles Espenlaub (United States) Joe Foster (United States) Charles Putman	(Germany) Lance David Arnold (Germany) Tim Müller (Germany) Valentin Pierburg	(United Kingdom) Adam Christodoulou (United States) Charles Espenlaub (United States) Joe Foster (United States) Charles Putman
SPX Winners	(Ukraine) No. 37 Tsunami R.T.	(Belgium) No. 78 Speed Lover	(Belgium) No. 58 VDS Racing Adventures	(San Marino) No. 77 GDL Racing	(Germany) No. 912 Manthey Racing	(Germany) No. 10 Leipert Motorsport	(Belgium) No. 58 VDS Racing Adventures	No entries
SPX Winners	(Ukraine) Oleksandr Gaidai (Ukraine) Andrii Kruglyk (France) Côme Ledogar (Italy) Alessio Rovera	(United States) Dominique Bastien (United States) Phillippe Denes	(Belgium) José Close (Belgium) Raphaël van der Straten	(Greece) Dimitris Deverikos (Italy) Gianluca de Lorenzi (Argentina) Andres Josephsohn	(Germany) Ralf Bohn (France) Mathieu Jaminet (Germany) Alfred Renauer (Germany) Robert Renauer	(Australia) Morgan Haber (Belgium) Anthony Lambert (Norway) Marcus Påverud (Germany) Harald Schlotter	(Belgium) José Close (Belgium) Raphaël van der Straten (Belgium) Joel Vanloocke	No entries
991-Pro Winners	(Switzerland) No. 62 FACH AUTO TECH	(France) No. 75 IDEC SPORT RACING	(Italy) No. 73 Ebimotors	(Italy) No. 73 Ebimotors	(Poland) No. 189 Forch Racing	(France) No. 64 Porsche Lorient Racing	(Italy) No. 73 EBIMOTORS	(United States) No. 74 JDX Racing
991-Pro Winners	(France) Julien Andlauer (Australia) Matt Campbell (Austria) Thomas Preining (Germany) Jens Richter	(France) David Abramczyk (France) Stéphane Adler (France) Michael Blanchemain (France) Romain Vozniak	(Italy) Carlo Curti (Italy) Lino Curti (Italy) Marco Frezza	(Italy) Carlo Curti (Italy) Lino Curti (Italy) Marco Frezza	(Germany) Christopher Bauer (Germany) Patrick Eisemann (Poland) Robert Lukas (Germany) Stefan Oschmann	(France) Gilles Blasco (France) Alain Demorge (France) Jean-François Demorge (France) Mathieu Pontais	(Italy) Carlo Curti (Italy) Lino Curti (Italy) Marco Frezza	(United States) David Baker (United States) Trenton Estep (United States) Mark Kvamme (United States) Alan Metni
991-Am Winners	(Germany) No. 67 race:pro motorsport	Merged with 991-Pro class						
991-Am Winners	(Italy) Claudio Cappelli (Republic of Ireland) Sean McInerney (United Kingdom) Phil Quaife (United Kingdom) James Thorpe	Merged with 991-Pro class						
SP2 Winners	(Belgium) No. 58 VDS Racing Adventures	No entries	Merged with SPX class					(Belgium) No. 58 VDS Racing Adventures
SP2 Winners	(Germany) Karim Al Azhari (Belgium) José Close (Germany) Wolfgang Haugg (Belgium) Grégory Paisse (Belgium) Raphaël van der Straten	No entries	Merged with SPX class					(Belgium) José Close (Luxembourg) Hary Putz (Luxembourg) Pol Stoffel (Belgium) Raphaël van der Straten
SP4 Winners	No entries	No entries	No entries				(Germany) No. 912 Manthey Racing	No entries
SP4 Winners	No entries	No entries	No entries				(Germany) Edward Lewis Brauner (Germany) Jürgen Häring (Germany) Sven Müller	No entries
GT4 Winners	(Germany) No. 247 Phoenix Racing	Merged with SPX class	(Belgium) No. 254 QSR Racingschool	(Germany) No. 263 Allied Racing	(United Kingdom) No. 47 Fox Motorsport	(Spain) No. 215 NM Racing Team	(United Kingdom) No. 47 Fox Motorsport	(United States) No. 272 Classic BMW
GT4 Winners	(United Kingdom) Philip Ellis (Germany) John-Louis Jasper (Finland) Joonas Lappalainen (Poland) Gosia Rdest	Merged with SPX class	(Belgium) Bert Redant (Belgium) Mario Timmers (Belgium) Michiel Verhaeren	(Germany) Jan Kasperlik (Germany) Dominique Schaak (Switzerland) Detlef Schmidt (Austria) Nicolas Schöll (Germany) Hendrik Still	(United Kingdom) Ben Clucas (United Kingdom) Andrew Perry (United Kingdom) Glen Sherwood (United Kingdom) Jamie Stanley	(Russia) Nikolay Dmitriev (France) Maxime Guillemat (Spain) Lluc Ibáñez (Spain) Max Llobet (Spain) Xavier Lloveras	(United Kingdom) Ben Clucas (United Kingdom) Andrew Perry (United Kingdom) Jamie Stanley	(United States) Andrew Davis (United States) Jason Hart (United States) Curt Swearingin (United States) Matt Travis (United States) Mike Vess

== See also ==
- 24H Series
- 2018 24H TCE Series
- 2018 24H Proto Series
- 2018 Dubai 24 Hour
