= Valentin Pierburg =

German racing driver (born 1992)

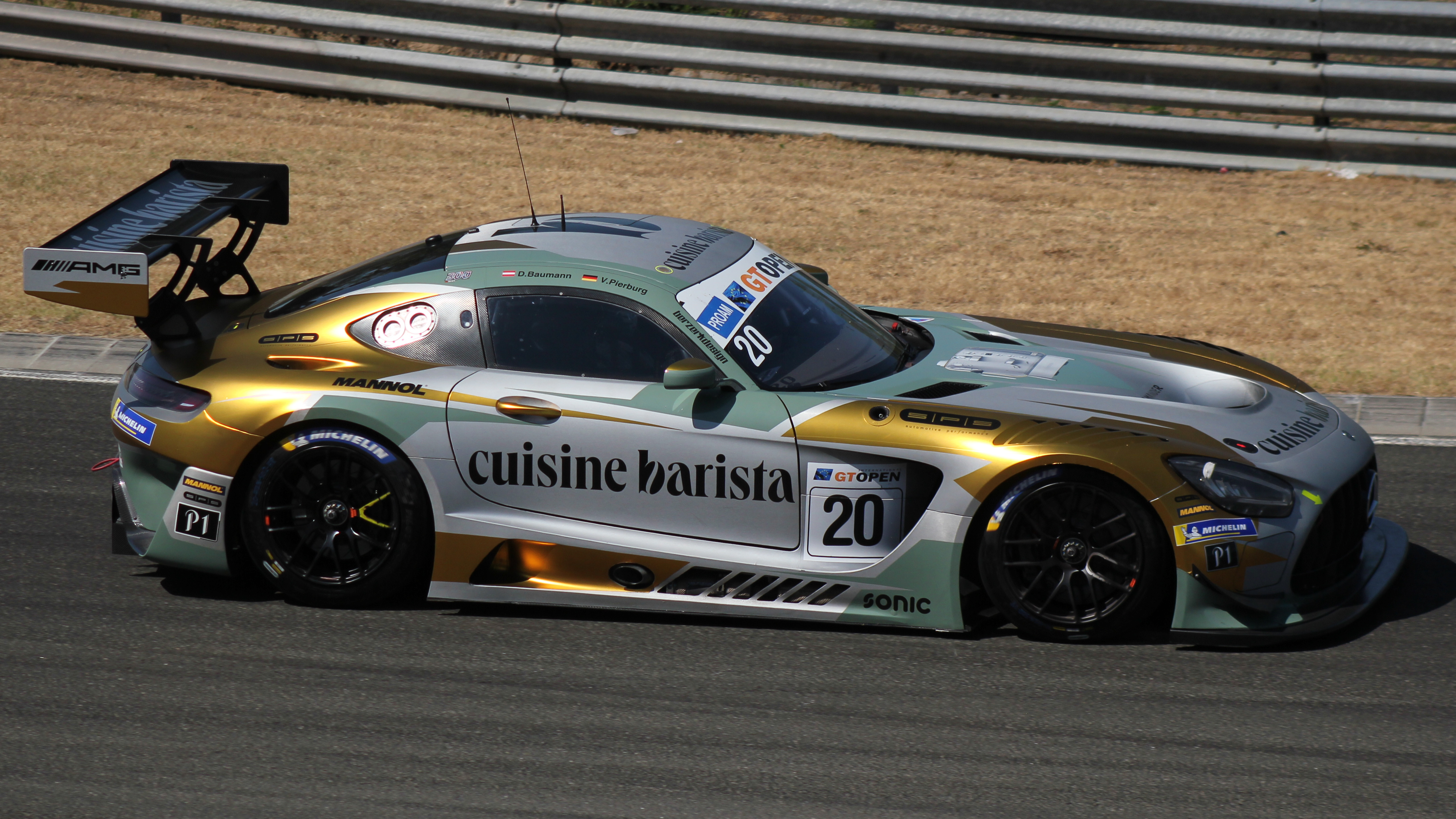
- Pierburg in 2025
- Nationality: (Germany) German
- Born: 27 April 1992 (age 34) Kilchberg, Zurich, Switzerland
- Categorisation: FIA Silver (2015–2017); FIA Bronze (2018–)

Championship titles
- 2018, 2025 2022: International GT Open – Pro-Am; Asian Le Mans Series – GT Am
Medal record
GT3
Representing Germany
FIA Motorsport Games
Silver medal – second place	2022 Le Castellet	GT Cup

Valentin Sebastian Pierburg (born 27 April 1992) is a German and Swiss businessman and racing driver. He is a two-time International GT Open champion in Pro-Am for SPS Automotive Performance.

== Business ventures ==
In 2014, Pierburg co-founded Lakestreet Capital Partners AG alongside Christian Kappelhoff-Wulff and, as of 2026, is a chairman at the company. In early 2026, Pierburg also joined Palace Capital plc as a non-executive director.

== Racing career ==
Pierburg made his car racing debut in 2014, driving a Mercedes SLS AMG GT3 for SPS Automotive Performance at the 12 Hours of Hungary, which he won alongside Lance David Arnold and Tim Müller. Across the next few seasons, Pierburg made select starts in the 24H Series for SPS, securing a podium at the 12 Hours of Brno in 2015, as well as making his Blancpain GT Series Endurance Cup debut for the team at Le Castellet in 2016.

In 2017, Pierburg continued with SPS to enter the International GT Open in the Pro-Am class. In his rookie season, Pierburg took class wins at Paul Ricard (with Tom Onslow-Cole) and the Hungaroring (with Arnold) to take fifth in points. In 2018, Pierburg remained in the series with SPS, scoring a win in each of the seven rounds with the exception of Monza, as he and Onslow-Cole dominated the Pro-Am class. That year, Pierburg also won the Dubai 24 Hour in the A6 Am class. Continuing in International GT Open for their title defence in 2019, Pierburg and Onslow-Cole won three times to finish runner-up in Pro-Am. Other cameos for Pierburg included two GT3 podiums at Road to Le Mans, a debut at the Kyalami 9 Hours, and a GT3 Gent win at the Gulf 12 Hours.

In 2020, Pierburg switched to the GT World Challenge Europe Sprint Cup to partner Mercedes-AMG factory driver Dominik Baumann, and finished on the podium in 9 of the 10 races to end the year third in Pro-Am. Pierburg also made his 24 Hours of Spa debut for CrowdStrike Racing with SPS, and scored an Am class win at Le Castellet in an International GT Open one-off. In 2021, Pierburg and Baumann remained with SPS for a dual GT World Challenge Europe campaign in Pro-Am. They once again took 9 out of 10 podiums, but class wins at Zandvoort and Valencia helped them to runner-up honours in Sprint, before they won the Endurance Cup finale at Barcelona alongside Martin Konrad.

After winning the Gulf 12 Hours in Pro-Am and the Asian Le Mans Series title in GT Am, Pierburg continued with SPS Automotive Performance for the GT World Challenge Europe Endurance Cup in 2022. Spending most of the season with Baumann and Ian Loggie, Pierburg won in three of his four Pro-Am starts (Imola, Paul Ricard and Barcelona) to claim runner-up in points, and took victory at the 24 Hours of Spa in a one-off outing in Bronze Cup. That year, Pierburg also represented Germany in the FIA Motorsport Games GT Cup discipline, in which he and Fabian Schiller finished second, and competed for fellow Mercedes customer team DXDT Racing at the Indianapolis 8 Hours.

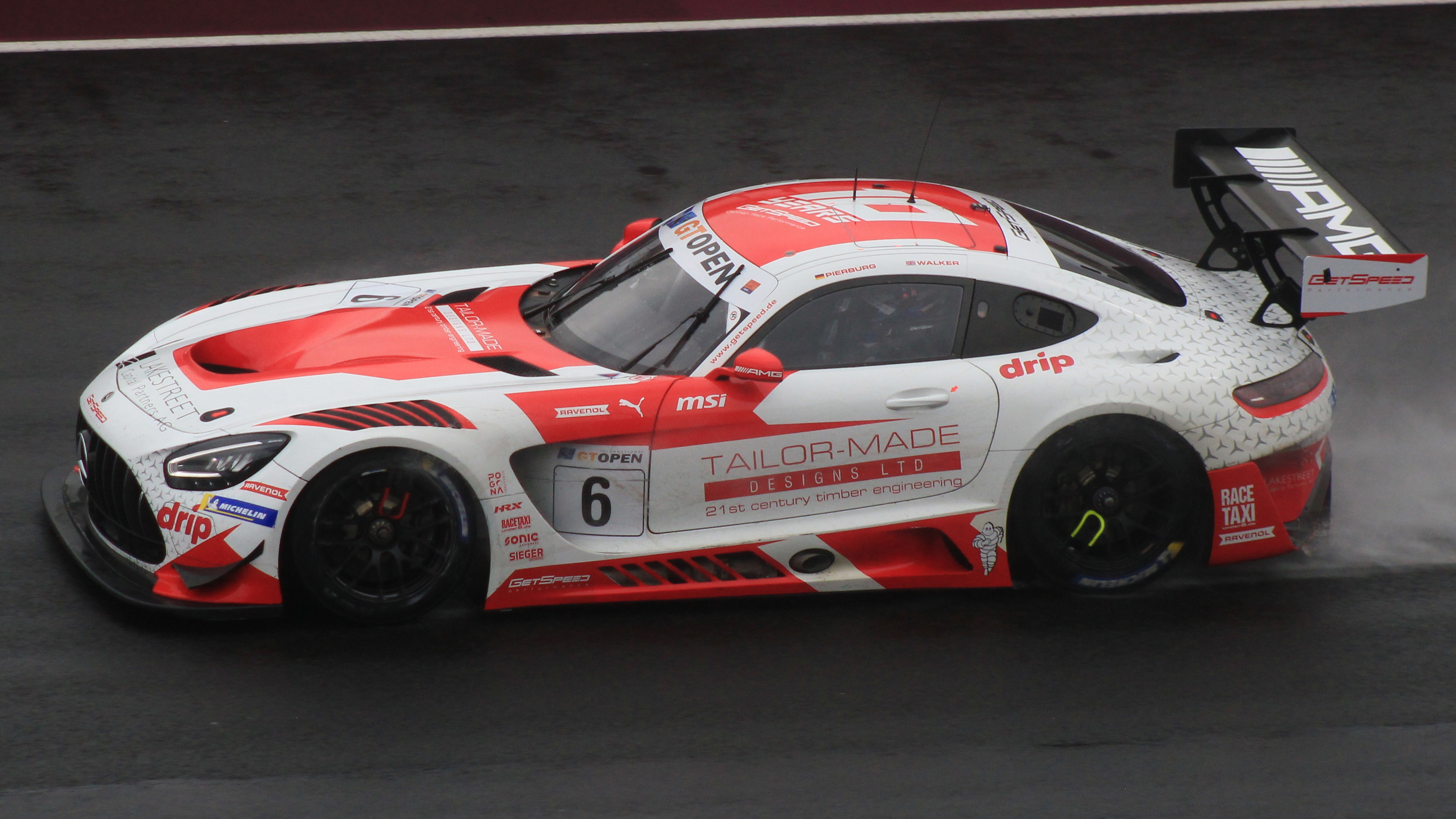
Pierburg's GetSpeed Mercedes at the Hungaroring in 2024.

After a sabbatical year, Pierburg returned to International GT Open in 2024, joining GetSpeed to share a Mercedes-AMG GT3 Evo with youngster Aaron Walker. The pair took class wins at Le Castellet and Barcelona to take fifth in the Pro-Am standings. Reuniting with Baumann and SPS for 2025, Pierburg took two poles, nine podiums, and won at Portimão and Paul Ricard to clinch his second International GT Open title in Pro-Am.

== Racing record ==
=== Racing career summary ===
Season	Series	Team	Races	Wins	Poles	F/Laps	Podiums	Points	Position
2014	12 Hours of Hungary	SPS automotive-performance	1	1	0	0	1	—N/a	**1st**
2015	24H Series – A6 Pro	SPS automotive-performance	4	0	0	0	1	43	17th
2016	24H Series – A6	SPS Automotive Performance	2	0	0	0	0	38	18th
2016	Blancpain GT Series Endurance Cup	SPS Automotive Performance	1	0	0	0	0	0	NC
2017	24H Series – A6	SPS Automotive Performance	2	0	0	0	0	26	30th
2017	International GT Open – Pro-Am	SPS Automotive Performance	14	2	0	0	4	57	5th
2018	24H GT Series Continents – A6 Am	SPS Automotive Performance	1	1	0	0	1	30	NC
2018	24H GT Series Europe – A6 Am	SPS Automotive Performance	2	1	0	0	1	29	19th
2018	International GT Open – Pro-Am	SPS Automotive Performance	14	6	0	0	8	78	**1st**
2019	24H GT Series Europe – A6 Am	SPS Automotive Performance	1	0	0	0	0	0	NC
2019	International GT Open – Pro-Am	SPS Automotive Performance	14	3	0	0	6	78	**2nd**
2019	Le Mans Cup – GT3	SPS Automotive Performance	2	0	0	0	2	0	NC†
2019	Kyalami 9 Hours – Am	Mercedes-AMG Team SPS Automotive Performance	1	0	0	0	1	—N/a	**2nd**
2019	Gulf 12 Hours – GT3 Gent	SPS Automotive Performance	1	1	0	0	1	—N/a	**1st**
2020	24H GT Series Continents – GT3 Pro	SPS Automotive Performance	1	0	0	0	0	18	NC
2020	GT World Challenge Europe Sprint Cup	SPS Automotive Performance	10	0	0	0	0	0	NC
2020	GT World Challenge Europe Sprint Cup – Pro-Am	SPS Automotive Performance	10	0	0	0	9	104	**3rd**
2020	International GT Open – Am	SPS Automotive Performance	2	1	1	0	1	14	5th
2020	International GT Open – Pro-Am	SPS Automotive Performance	2	0	1	0	2	14	9th
2020	GT World Challenge Europe Endurance Cup	CrowdStrike Racing with SPS	1	0	0	0	0	0	NC
2020	GT World Challenge Europe Endurance Cup – Pro-Am	CrowdStrike Racing with SPS	1	0	0	0	0	11	22nd
2020	Intercontinental GT Challenge	CrowdStrike Racing with SPS	1	0	0	0	0	0	NC
2021	24H GT Series – GT3 Am	Mercedes-AMG Team HRT Abu Dhabi Racing	1	1	0	0	1	41	NC
2021	24H GT Series – GT3 Am	SPS Automotive Performance	1	0	0	0	0	41	NC
2021	GT World Challenge Europe Endurance Cup	SPS Automotive Performance	5	0	0	0	0	0	NC
2021	GT World Challenge Europe Endurance Cup – Pro-Am	SPS Automotive Performance	5	1	0	0	1	69	6th
2021	GT World Challenge Europe Sprint Cup	SPS Automotive Performance	10	0	0	0	0	0	NC
2021	GT World Challenge Europe Sprint Cup – Pro-Am	SPS Automotive Performance	10	2	2	0	9	116.5	**2nd**
2022	Gulf 12 Hours – GT3 Pro-Am	SPS Automotive Performance	1	1	0	0	1	—N/a	**1st**
2022	24H GT Series – GT3 Am	SPS Automotive Performance	1	0	0	0	1	25	NC
2022	Asian Le Mans Series – GT Am	SPS Automotive Performance	4	2	0	0	4	86	**1st**
2022	GT World Challenge Europe Endurance Cup	SPS Automotive Performance	5	0	0	0	0	0	NC
2022	GT World Challenge Europe Endurance Cup – Pro-Am	SPS Automotive Performance	4	3	0	0	4	101	**2nd**
2022	GT World Challenge Europe Endurance Cup – Bronze	SPS Automotive Performance	1	1	0	0	1	0	NC
2022	International GT Open – Pro-Am	SPS Automotive Performance	2	0	0	0	0	0	22nd
2022	FIA Motorsport Games GT Cup	Team Germany	1	0	0	0	1	—N/a	**2nd**
2022	GT World Challenge America – Am	Qelo Capital/DXDT Racing	1	0	0	0	0	0	NC†
2024	International GT Open – Pro-Am	GetSpeed	14	2	0	0	4	64	5th
2024	Le Mans Cup – GT3	Heart of Racing by SPS	2	0	0	0	0	0	NC†
2025	International GT Open – Pro-Am	SPS Automotive Performance	14	2	2	0	9	98	**1st**

^{†} As Pierburg was a guest driver, he was ineligible to score points.

=== Complete GT World Challenge Europe results ===
==== GT World Challenge Europe Endurance Cup ====
(key) (Races in bold indicate pole position) (Races in italics indicate fastest lap)

Year	Team	Car	Class	1	2	3	4	5	6	7	Pos.	Points
2016	SPS Automotive Performance	Mercedes-AMG GT3	Pro	MNZ	SIL	LEC; 21	SPA; 6H	SPA; 12H	SPA; 24H	NÜR	NC	0
2020	SPS Automotive Performance	Mercedes-AMG GT3 Evo	Pro-Am	IMO	NÜR	SPA; 6H; 45	SPA; 12H; 36	SPA; 24H; 27	LEC		22nd	11
2021	SPS Automotive Performance	Mercedes-AMG GT3 Evo	Pro-Am	MNZ; 28	LEC; 28	SPA; 6H; 41	SPA; 12H; 26	SPA; 24H; 25	NÜR; 27	CAT; 25	6th	69
2022	SPS Automotive Performance	Mercedes-AMG GT3 Evo	Pro-Am	IMO; 32	LEC; 24				HOC; 31	CAT; 31	2nd	101
2022	SPS Automotive Performance	Mercedes-AMG GT3 Evo	Bronze			SPA; 6H; 53	SPA; 12H; 46	SPA; 24H; 34			NC	0

==== GT World Challenge Europe Sprint Cup ====
(key) (Races in bold indicate pole position) (Races in italics indicate fastest lap)

Year	Team	Car	Class	1	2	3	4	5	6	7	8	9	10	Pos.	Points
2020	SPS Automotive Performance	Mercedes-AMG GT3 Evo	Pro-Am	MIS; 1; 12	MIS; 2; 16	MIS; 3; 12	MAG; 1; 16	MAG; 2; 17	ZAN; 1; 14	**ZAN**; **2**; 18	CAT; 1; 19	CAT; 2; 14	CAT; 3; 14	3rd	104
2021	SPS Automotive Performance	Mercedes-AMG GT3 Evo	Pro-Am	MAG; 1; 21	MAG; 2; 17	ZAN; 1; 22	ZAN; 2; 20	MIS; 1; 24	MIS; 2; 19	BRH; 1; 25	BRH; 2; 25	**VAL**; **1**; 21	**VAL**; **2**; 14	2nd	116.5

=== Complete International GT Open results ===
(key) (Races in bold indicate pole position) (Races in italics indicate fastest lap)

Year	Team	Car	Class	1	2	3	4	5	6	7	8	9	10	11	12	13	14	Pos.	Points
2017	SPS Automotive Performance	Mercedes-AMG GT3	Pro-Am	EST; 1; 6	EST; 2; 6	SPA; 1 Ret	SPA; 2 Ret	LEC; 1; 1	LEC; 2; 4	HUN; 1; 1	HUN; 2; 6	SIL; 1; 2	SIL; 2; 5	MNZ; 1; 3	MNZ; 2; 5	CAT; 1; 4	CAT; 2; 6	5th	57
2018	SPS Automotive Performance	Mercedes-AMG GT3	Pro-Am	EST; 1; 1	EST; 2; 6	LEC; 1; 1	LEC; 2 Ret	SPA; 1; 1	SPA; 2; 3	HUN; 1; 1	HUN; 2; 10	SIL; 1; 11	SIL; 2; 1	MNZ; 1; 6	MNZ; 2; 7	CAT; 1; 1	CAT; 2; 3	1st	78
2019	SPS Automotive Performance	Mercedes-AMG GT3	Pro-Am	LEC; 1; 1	LEC; 2; 8	HOC; 1; 2	HOC; 2; 4	SPA; 1; 4	SPA; 2; 1	RBR; 1; 5	RBR; 2; 1	SIL; 1; 2	SIL; 2; 3	CAT; 1; 5	CAT; 2; 6	MNZ; 1; 6	MNZ; 2 DSQ	2nd	78
2020	SPS Automotive Performance	Mercedes-AMG GT3 Evo	Am	HUN; 1	HUN; 2	LEC; 1; 4	**LEC**; **2**; 1	RBR; 1	RBR; 2	MNZ; 1	MNZ; 2							5th	14
2020	SPS Automotive Performance	Mercedes-AMG GT3 Evo	Pro-Am									SPA; 1; 2	**SPA**; **2**; 2	CAT; 1	CAT; 2			9th	14
2022	SPS Automotive Performance	Mercedes-AMG GT3 Evo	Pro-Am	EST; 1	EST; 2	LEC; 1	LEC; 2	SPA	HUN; 1; 7	HUN; 2; 9	RBR; 1	RBR; 2	MNZ; 1	MNZ; 2	CAT; 1	CAT; 2		22nd	0
2024	GetSpeed	Mercedes-AMG GT3 Evo	Pro-Am	ALG; 1; 19	ALG; 2; 18	HOC; 1; 11	HOC; 2; 4	SPA; 2	HUN; 1; 7	HUN; 2; 7	LEC; 1; 1	LEC; 2; 4	RBR; 1; 3	RBR; 2; 9	CAT; 1; 1	CAT; 2; 9	MNZ; 5	5th	64
2025	SPS Automotive Performance	Mercedes-AMG GT3 Evo	Pro-Am	ALG; 1; 1	ALG; 2; 2	SPA; 2	**HOC**; **1**; 2	HOC; 2; 6	HUN; 1; 8	HUN; 2; 3	LEC; 1; 1	LEC; 2; 9	RBR; 1; 5	RBR; 2; 4	CAT; 1; 2	**CAT**; **2**; 2	MNZ; 3	1st	98

=== Complete Asian Le Mans Series results ===
(key) (Races in bold indicate pole position) (Races in italics indicate fastest lap)

Year	Team	Class	Car	Engine	1	2	3	4	Pos.	Points
2022	SPS Automotive Performance	GT Am	Mercedes-AMG GT3 Evo	Mercedes-AMG M159 6.2 L V8	DUB; 1; 1	DUB; 2; 1	ABU; 1; 2	ABU; 2; 2	1st	86
