= 2022 FIA Motorsport Games GT Cup =

Motorsport event

Race details
| Date | 26–30 October |
| Official name | FIA Motorsport Games Touring GT Cup |
| Location | Circuit Paul Ricard, France |
| Course | Permanent circuit 5.842 km (3.630 mi) |
| Distance | Qualifying Race 1; 60 minutes Qualifying Race 2; 60 minutes Main Race; 60 minutes |
- Qualifying Race 1

Pole
| Driver | (Germany) Valentin Pierburg | Team Germany |
| Time | 2:04.334 |

Fastest lap
| Driver | (France) Simon Gachet | Team France |
| Time | 2:03.219 |

Podium
| First | (Germany) Valentin Pierburg (Germany) Fabian Schiller | Team Germany |
| Second | (France) Eric Debard (France) Simon Gachet | Team France |
| Third | (United Kingdom) Ian Loggie (United Kingdom) Sam Neary | Team United Kingdom |
- Qualifying Race 2

Pole
| Driver | (France) Simon Gachet | Team France |
| Time | 2:01.648 |

Fastest lap
| Driver | (Germany) Fabian Schiller | Team Germany |
| Time | 2:02.854 |

Podium
| First | (Germany) Valentin Pierburg (Germany) Fabian Schiller | Team Germany |
| Second | (France) Eric Debard (France) Simon Gachet | Team France |
| Third | (Poland) Marcin Jedlinski (Poland) Karol Basz | Team Poland |
- Main Race

Pole
| Driver | (Germany) Valentin Pierburg (Germany) Fabian Schiller | Team Germany |

Fastest lap
| Driver | (Germany) Fabian Schiller | Team Germany |
| Time | 2:03.443 |

Medalists
| 1st place, gold medalist(s) | (France) Eric Debard (France) Simon Gachet | Team France |
| 2nd place, silver medalist(s) | (Germany) Valentin Pierburg (Germany) Fabian Schiller | Team Germany |
| 3rd place, bronze medalist(s) | (United Kingdom) Ian Loggie (United Kingdom) Sam Neary | Team United Kingdom |

The 2022 FIA Motorsport Games GT Cup was the second FIA Motorsport Games GT Cup, held at Circuit Paul Ricard, France on 26 October to 30 October 2022. The race was contested with GT3-spec cars. Only Silver and Bronze drivers were allowed to compete. The event was part of the 2022 FIA Motorsport Games.

== Entry list ==
| Team | Entrant | Car | Engine | No. | Drivers |
|---|---|---|---|---|---|
| Team Australia | (Australia) Grove Motorsport | Porsche 911 GT3 R | Porsche 4.0 L Flat-6 | 4 | Brenton Grove |
| Team Australia | (Australia) Grove Motorsport | Porsche 911 GT3 R | Porsche 4.0 L Flat-6 | 4 | Stephen Grove |
| Team Spain | Motorsport Team Spain by Antonelli Motorsport | Mercedes-AMG GT3 Evo | Mercedes-AMG M159 6.2 L V8 | 19 | Gonzalo de Andrés |
| Team Spain | Motorsport Team Spain by Antonelli Motorsport | Mercedes-AMG GT3 Evo | Mercedes-AMG M159 6.2 L V8 | 19 | Fernando Navarrete |
| Team Germany | (Germany) SPS Automotive Performance | Mercedes-AMG GT3 Evo | Mercedes-AMG M159 6.2 L V8 | 20 | Valentin Pierburg |
| Team Germany | (Germany) SPS Automotive Performance | Mercedes-AMG GT3 Evo | Mercedes-AMG M159 6.2 L V8 | 20 | Fabian Schiller |
| Team Hong Kong | (Hong Kong) KCMG | Honda NSX GT3 Evo22 | Honda 3.5 L Turbo V6 | 25 | Paul Ip |
| Team Hong Kong | (Hong Kong) KCMG | Honda NSX GT3 Evo22 | Honda 3.5 L Turbo V6 | 25 | Marchy Lee |
| Team Brazil | (France) AKKodis ASP Team | Mercedes-AMG GT3 Evo | Mercedes-AMG M159 6.2 L V8 | 44 | Adalberto Baptista |
| Team Brazil | (France) AKKodis ASP Team | Mercedes-AMG GT3 Evo | Mercedes-AMG M159 6.2 L V8 | 44 | Bruno Baptista |
| Team Ukraine | (Germany) PROsport Racing | Aston Martin Vantage AMR GT3 | Aston Martin 4.0 L Turbo V8 | 48 | Ivan Peklin |
| Team Ukraine | (Germany) PROsport Racing | Aston Martin Vantage AMR GT3 | Aston Martin 4.0 L Turbo V8 | 48 | Evgeny Sokolovsky |
| Team Puerto Rico | (Italy) AF Corse | Ferrari 488 GT3 Evo 2020 | Ferrari F154CB 3.9 L Turbo V8 | 51 | Víctor Gómez |
| Team Puerto Rico | (Italy) AF Corse | Ferrari 488 GT3 Evo 2020 | Ferrari F154CB 3.9 L Turbo V8 | 51 | Francesco Piovanetti |
| Team Switzerland | (Germany) SPS Automotive Performance | Mercedes-AMG GT3 Evo | Mercedes-AMG M159 6.2 L V8 | 54 | Yannick Mettler |
| Team Switzerland | (Germany) SPS Automotive Performance | Mercedes-AMG GT3 Evo | Mercedes-AMG M159 6.2 L V8 | 54 | Dexter Müller |
| Team Chinese Taipei | (Italy) AF Corse | Ferrari 488 GT3 Evo 2020 | Ferrari F154CB 3.9 L Turbo V8 | 68 | Evan Chen |
| Team Chinese Taipei | (Italy) AF Corse | Ferrari 488 GT3 Evo 2020 | Ferrari F154CB 3.9 L Turbo V8 | 68 | Max Chen |
| Team Lithuania | (Lithuania) Juta Racing | Audi R8 LMS Evo | Audi 5.2 L V10 | 71 | Jonas Gelžinis |
| Team Lithuania | (Lithuania) Juta Racing | Audi R8 LMS Evo | Audi 5.2 L V10 | 71 | Eimantas Navikauskas |
| Team France | (France) AKKodis ASP Team | Mercedes-AMG GT3 Evo | Mercedes-AMG M159 6.2 L V8 | 81 | Eric Debard |
| Team France | (France) AKKodis ASP Team | Mercedes-AMG GT3 Evo | Mercedes-AMG M159 6.2 L V8 | 81 | Simon Gachet |
| Team United Kingdom | (United Kingdom) Sky - Tempesta by RAM Racing | Mercedes-AMG GT3 Evo | Mercedes-AMG M159 6.2 L V8 | 93 | Ian Loggie |
| Team United Kingdom | (United Kingdom) Sky - Tempesta by RAM Racing | Mercedes-AMG GT3 Evo | Mercedes-AMG M159 6.2 L V8 | 93 | Sam Neary |
| Team Poland | (Poland) Olimp Racing | Audi R8 LMS Evo II | Audi 5.2 L V10 | 777 | Karol Basz |
| Team Poland | (Poland) Olimp Racing | Audi R8 LMS Evo II | Audi 5.2 L V10 | 777 | Marcin Jedlinski |

== Results ==
=== Qualifying 1 ===
| Pos | No. | Driver | Team | Time | Gap | Grid |
|---|---|---|---|---|---|---|
| 1 | 20 | Valentin Pierburg | Team Germany | 2:04.334 | — | 1 |
| 2 | 81 | Eric Debard | Team France | 2:04.862 | + 0.528 | 2 |
| 3 | 93 | Ian Loggie | Team United Kingdom | 2:05.004 | + 0.670 | 3 |
| 4 | 777 | Marcin Jedlinski | Team Poland | 2:05.463 | + 1.129 | 4 |
| 5 | 19 | Fernando Navarrete | Team Spain | 2:05.876 | + 1.542 | 5 |
| 6 | 51 | Francesco Piovanetti | Team Puerto Rico | 2:06.711 | + 2.377 | 6 |
| 7 | 4 | Stephen Grove | Team Australia | 2:06.725 | + 2.391 | 7 |
| 8 | 48 | Evgeny Sokolovsky | Team Ukraine | 2:07.464 | + 3.130 | 8 |
| 9 | 71 | Eimantas Navikauskas | Team Lithuania | 2:07.707 | + 3.373 | 9 |
| 10 | 44 | Adalberto Baptista | Team Brazil | 2:07.828 | + 3.494 | 10 |
| 11 | 54 | Dexter Müller | Team Switzerland | 2:07.918 | + 3.584 | 11 |
| 12 | 25 | Paul Ip | Team Hong Kong | 2:08.862 | + 4.528 | 12 |
| 13 | 68 | Max Chen | Team Chinese Taipei | 2:53.621 | + 49.287 | 13 |

=== Qualifying 2 ===
| Pos | No. | Driver | Team | Time | Gap | Grid |
|---|---|---|---|---|---|---|
| 1 | 81 | Simon Gachet | Team France | 2:01.648 | — | 1 |
| 2 | 20 | Fabian Schiller | Team Germany | 2:01.826 | + 0.178 | 2 |
| 3 | 777 | Karol Basz | Team Poland | 2:02.298 | + 0.650 | 3 |
| 4 | 68 | Evan Chen | Team Chinese Taipei | 2:02.787 | + 1.139 | 4 |
| 5 | 54 | Yannick Mettler | Team Switzerland | 2:02.997 | + 1.349 | 5 |
| 6 | 48 | Ivan Peklin | Team Ukraine | 2:03.209 | + 1.561 | 6 |
| 7 | 44 | Bruno Baptista | Team Brazil | 2:03.224 | + 1.576 | 7 |
| 8 | 93 | Sam Neary | Team United Kingdom | 2:03.287 | + 1.639 | 8 |
| 9 | 51 | Víctor Gómez | Team Puerto Rico | 2:03.636 | + 1.988 | 9 |
| 10 | 25 | Marchy Lee | Team Hong Kong | 2:04.150 | + 2.502 | 10 |
| 11 | 4 | Brenton Grove | Team Australia | 2:04.165 | + 2.517 | 11 |
| 12 | 71 | Jonas Gelžinis | Team Lithuania | 2:04.790 | + 3.142 | 12 |
| NC | 19 | Gonzalo de Andrés | Team Spain | | | 13 |

=== Qualifying Race 1 ===
| Pos | No. | Driver | Team | Laps | Time/Retired | Grid | Points |
|---|---|---|---|---|---|---|---|
| 1 | 20 | Valentin Pierburg; Fabian Schiller | Team Germany | 29 | 1:01:39.926 | 1 | 1 |
| 2 | 81 | Eric Debard; Simon Gachet | Team France | 29 | + 22.402 ^{2} | 2 | 2 |
| 3 | 93 | Ian Loggie; Sam Neary | Team United Kingdom | 29 | + 29.254 | 3 | 3 |
| 4 | 777 | Marcin Jedlinski; Karol Basz | Team Poland | 29 | + 43.229 | 4 | 4 |
| 5 | 51 | Francesco Piovanetti; Víctor Gómez | Team Puerto Rico | 29 | + 45.387 | 6 | 5 |
| 6 | 44 | Adalberto Baptista; Bruno Baptista | Team Brazil | 29 | + 56.534 | 10 | 6 |
| 7 | 54 | Dexter Müller; Yannick Mettler | Team Switzerland | 29 | + 57.511 | 11 | 7 |
| 8 | 71 | Eimantas Navikauskas; Jonas Gelžinis | Team Lithuania | 29 | + 1:19.331 | 9 | 8 |
| 9 | 48 | Evgeny Sokolovsky; Ivan Peklin | Team Ukraine | 29 | + 1:20.082 | 8 | 9 |
| 10 | 4 | Stephen Grove; Brenton Grove | Team Australia | 29 | + 1:28.560 ^{1} | 7 | 10 |
| 11 | 68 | Max Chen; Evan Chen | Team Chinese Taipei | 29 | + 1:32.221 | 13 | 11 |
| 12 | 25 | Paul Ip; Marchy Lee | Team Hong Kong | 29 | + 1:58.674 | 12 | 12 |
| 13 | 19 | Fernando Navarrete; Gonzalo de Andrés | Team Spain | 28 | + 1 Lap | 5 | 13 |

Notes

- ^1 – CAR 4 - 10 SEC. TIME PENALTY - CONTACT WITH CAR 54
- ^2 – CAR 81 - 5 SEC. TIME PENALTY - TRACK LIMITS

=== Qualifying Race 2 ===
| Pos | No. | Driver | Team | Laps | Time/Retired | Grid | Points |
|---|---|---|---|---|---|---|---|
| 1 | 20 | Valentin Pierburg; Fabian Schiller | Team Germany | 29 | 1:01:45.815 | 2 | 1 |
| 2 | 81 | Eric Debard; Simon Gachet | Team France | 29 | + 6.173 ^{2} | 1 | 2 |
| 3 | 777 | Marcin Jedlinski; Karol Basz | Team Poland | 29 | + 36.213 | 3 | 3 |
| 4 | 93 | Ian Loggie; Sam Neary | Team United Kingdom | 29 | + 44.376 | 8 | 4 |
| 5 | 54 | Dexter Müller; Yannick Mettler | Team Switzerland | 29 | + 56.536 | 5 | 5 |
| 6 | 48 | Evgeny Sokolovsky; Ivan Peklin | Team Ukraine | 29 | + 1:21.417 | 6 | 6 |
| 7 | 19 | Fernando Navarrete; Gonzalo de Andrés | Team Spain | 29 | + 1:21.530 ^{1} | 13 | 7 |
| 8 | 68 | Max Chen; Evan Chen | Team Chinese Taipei | 29 | + 1:25.430 | 4 | 8 |
| 9 | 25 | Paul Ip; Marchy Lee | Team Hong Kong | 29 | + 1:39.178 | 10 | 9 |
| 10 | 51 | Francesco Piovanetti; Víctor Gómez | Team Puerto Rico | 29 | + 1:42.243 ^{3} ^{4} | 9 | 10 |
| 11 | 71 | Eimantas Navikauskas; Jonas Gelžinis | Team Lithuania | 29 | + 1:45.439 | 12 | 11 |
| Ret | 44 | Adalberto Baptista; Bruno Baptista | Team Brazil | 13 | Retired | 7 | 12 |
| Ret | 4 | Stephen Grove; Brenton Grove | Team Australia | 1 | Retired | 11 | 13 |

Notes

- ^1 – CAR 19 - 5 SEC. TIME PENALTY - TRACK LIMITS
- ^2 – CAR 81 - 5 SEC. TIME PENALTY - TRACK LIMITS
- ^3 – CAR 51 - 5 SEC. TIME PENALTY - TRACK LIMITS
- ^4 – Following stewards decision no. 28 a time penalty of 10 seconds for car no. 51

=== Points ===
| Pos | No. | Driver | Team | QR1 | QR2 | Total |
|---|---|---|---|---|---|---|
| 1 | 20 | Valentin Pierburg; Fabian Schiller | Team Germany | 1 | 1 | 2 |
| 2 | 81 | Eric Debard; Simon Gachet | Team France | 2 | 2 | 4 |
| 3 | 777 | Marcin Jedlinski; Karol Basz | Team Poland | 4 | 3 | 7 |
| 4 | 93 | Ian Loggie; Sam Neary | Team United Kingdom | 3 | 4 | 7 |
| 5 | 54 | Dexter Müller; Yannick Mettler | Team Switzerland | 7 | 5 | 12 |
| 6 | 51 | Francesco Piovanetti; Víctor Gómez | Team Puerto Rico | 5 | 10 | 15 |
| 7 | 48 | Evgeny Sokolovsky; Ivan Peklin | Team Ukraine | 9 | 6 | 15 |
| 8 | 44 | Adalberto Baptista; Bruno Baptista | Team Brazil | 6 | 12 | 18 |
| 9 | 68 | Max Chen; Evan Chen | Team Chinese Taipei | 11 | 8 | 19 |
| 10 | 71 | Eimantas Navikauskas; Jonas Gelžinis | Team Lithuania | 8 | 11 | 19 |
| 11 | 19 | Fernando Navarrete; Gonzalo de Andrés | Team Spain | 13 | 7 | 20 |
| 12 | 25 | Paul Ip; Marchy Lee | Team Hong Kong | 12 | 9 | 21 |
| 13 | 4 | Stephen Grove; Brenton Grove | Team Australia | 10 | 13 | 23 |

=== Main Race ===
| Pos | No. | Driver | Team | Laps | Time/Retired | Grid |
|---|---|---|---|---|---|---|
| 1st place, gold medalist(s) | 81 | Eric Debard; Simon Gachet | Team France | 28 | 1:01:49.203 | 2 |
| 2nd place, silver medalist(s) | 20 | Valentin Pierburg; Fabian Schiller | Team Germany | 28 | + 1.055 | 1 |
| 3rd place, bronze medalist(s) | 93 | Ian Loggie; Sam Neary | Team United Kingdom | 28 | + 1.977 | 4 |
| 4 | 777 | Marcin Jedlinski; Karol Basz | Team Poland | 28 | + 2.402 | 3 |
| 5 | 54 | Dexter Müller; Yannick Mettler | Team Switzerland | 28 | + 3.093 | 5 |
| 6 | 51 | Francesco Piovanetti; Víctor Gómez | Team Puerto Rico | 28 | + 4.178 | 6 |
| 7 | 4 | Stephen Grove; Brenton Grove | Team Australia | 28 | + 4.419 | 13 |
| 8 | 71 | Eimantas Navikauskas; Jonas Gelžinis | Team Lithuania | 28 | + 6.567 | 10 |
| 9 | 44 | Adalberto Baptista; Bruno Baptista | Team Brazil | 28 | + 20.676 ^{1} ^{2} | 8 |
| 10 | 19 | Fernando Navarrete; Gonzalo de Andrés | Team Spain | 28 | + 49.707 | 11 |
| 11 | 48 | Evgeny Sokolovsky; Ivan Peklin | Team Ukraine | 28 | + 50.240 | 7 |
| 12 | 25 | Paul Ip; Marchy Lee | Team Hong Kong | 26 | + 2 Laps | 12 |
| 13 | 68 | Max Chen; Evan Chen | Team Chinese Taipei | 25 | + 3 Laps | 9 |

Notes

- ^1 – CAR 44 - 10 SEC: TIME PENALTY - CAUSED A COLLISION
- ^2 – CAR 44 - ADDITIONAL 5 SEC. TIME PENALTY - TRACK LIMITS
