= 2018 Dubai 24 Hour =

The layout of the Dubai Autodrome.

The 2018 Dubai 24 Hour was the 13th running of the Dubai 24 Hour endurance race. It took place at the Dubai Autodrome in Dubai, United Arab Emirates, and ran between 11–13 January 2018. Drive time for a drivers stint was capped at 2 hours before a driver change must take place. A driver must also be out of the car for half of their drive time. Darkness lasted for 13 hours & 18 minutes of the race. Sunrise was at 7:06am local time.

== Race result ==
Class Winners in bold.

This was the first year where two different series raced at the same time. The GT Series & the TCE Series.

With 4 hrs & 4 mins to go, the #3 Black Falcon crashed out of the race along with the #1 Hofor-Racing car. Shortly after, the # 2 Black Falcon car would take the lead & never relinquish it.

Pos	Class	No	Team	Drivers	Car	Laps
1	**A6-PRO**	**2**	**(Germany) Black Falcon**	**(Saudi Arabia) Abdulaziz Al Faisal** **(Germany) Hubert Haupt** **(Netherlands) Yelmer Buurman** **(Italy) Gabriele Piana**	**Mercedes-AMG GT3**	**606**
2	A6-PRO	12	(Germany) Manthey Racing	(Germany) Lars Kern (Germany) Sven Müller (Germany) Otto Klohs (France) Mathieu Jaminet	Porsche 911 GT3 R	604
3	A6-PRO	964	(Austria) GRT Grasser Racing Team	(Switzerland) Mark Ineichen (Switzerland) Rolf Ineichen (Germany) Christian Engelhart (Italy) Mirko Bortolotti	Lamborghini Huracán GT3	604
4	**A6-AM**	**16**	(Germany) **SPS automotive performance**	(Austria) **Dominik Baumann** **(Germany) Lance David Arnold** **(Germany) Tim Müller** **(Germany) Valentin Pierburg**	**Mercedes-AMG GT3**	**597**
5	A6-PRO	9	(Germany) BWT Mücke Motorsport	(Germany) Markus Winkelhock (Germany) Mike David Ortmann (Germany) Andreas Weishaupt (Switzerland) Ricardo Feller (Germany) Christer Jöns	Audi R8 LMS	597
6	**SPX**	**37**	(Ukraine) **Tsunami R.T.**	(Ukraine) **Andrii Kruglyk** **(France) Côme Ledogar** **(Ukraine) Oleksandr Gaidai** **(Italy) Alessio Rovera**	**Porsche 911 GT3 MR II**	**593**
7	A6-PRO	777	(Saudi Arabia) MS7 by WRT	(Germany) Christopher Mies (Belgium) Dries Vanthoor (Netherlands) Michael Vergers (Saudi Arabia) Mohammed Bin Saud Al Saud	Audi R8 LMS	592
8	A6-AM	18	(Netherlands) V8 Racing	(Netherlands) Luc Braams (Netherlands) Duncan Huisman (Netherlands) Alex van t'Hoff (Netherlands) Rick Abresch (United Kingdom) Finlay Hutchison	Chevrolet Corvette C6.R ZR1	592
9	A6-AM	25	(Germany) HTP Motorsport	(Austria) Alexander Hrachowina (Netherlands) Indy Dontje (Germany) Bernd Schneider (Luxembourg) Brice Bosi (Austria) Martin Konrad	Mercedes-AMG GT3	592
10	A6-AM	911	(Germany) Herberth Motorsport	(Switzerland) Daniel Allemann (Germany) Ralf Bohn (Germany) Robert Renauer (Germany) Alfred Renauer (Norway) Dennis Olsen	Porsche 911 GT3 R	590
11	A6-AM	34	(Germany) Car Collection Motorsport	(Germany) Johannes Kirchhoff (Germany) Gustav Edelhoff (Germany) Elmar Grimm (Germany) Ingo Vogler (Norway) Wiggo Dalmo	Audi R8 LMS	589
12	A6-AM	963	(Austria) GRT Grasser Racing Team	(Netherlands) Rik Breukers (Switzerland) Mauro Calamia (Switzerland) Christoph Lenz (Italy) Roberto Pampanini (Switzerland) Mark Ineichen	Lamborghini Huracán GT3	589
13	A6-PRO	20	(Japan) D'station Racing	(Japan) Tsubasa Kondo (Japan) Tomonobu Fujii (Japan) Seiji Ara (Japan) Satoshi Hoshino	Porsche 911 GT3 R	588
14	**991-PRO**	**62**	(Switzerland) **FACH AUTO TECH**	(Germany) **Jens Richter** **(Austria) Thomas Preining** **(France) Julien Andlauer** **(Australia) Matt Campbell**	**Porsche 991 GT3 Cup**	'585
15	A6-PRO	8	(Germany) Lambda Performance	(Germany) Daniel Keilwitz (Hungary) Csaba Walter (Germany) Frank Kechele (Belgium) Nico Verdonck	Ford GT3 Lambda	584
16	A6-AM	27	(United Arab Emirates) GP Extreme	(Republic of Ireland) Frédéric Fatien (Germany) Roald Goethe (United Kingdom) Stuart Hall (South Africa) Jordan Grogor (Canada) Bassam Kronfli	Renault RS01 GT3	581
17	**991-AM**	**67**	(Germany) **race:pro motorsport**	(United Kingdom) **James Thorpe** **(Italy) Claudio Cappelli** **(Republic of Ireland) Sean McInerney** **(United Kingdom) Phil Quaife**	**Porsche 991 GT3 Cup**	**578**
18	991-AM	26	(Germany) MRS GT-Racing	(Australia) Stephen Grove (Germany) Bertram Hornung (Germany) Matthias Jeserich (Belgium) Glenn van Parijs	Porsche 991 GT3 Cup	577
19	991-AM	95	(Lebanon) Duel Racing	(United Kingdom) Jules Westwood (Lebanon) Sami Moutran (Lebanon) Nabil Moutran (Lebanon) Ramzi Moutran	Porsche 991 GT3 Cup	575
20	SPX	89	(Germany) MRS GT-Racing	(Austria) Christopher Zöchling (Germany) Altfrid Heger (Germany) Georg Bernsteiner (Germany) Helmut Rödig	Porsche 991-II (Modified)	572
21	A6-AM	19	(Netherlands) MP Motorsport	(Netherlands) Daniël de Jong (Netherlands) Henk de Jong (Netherlands) Bert de Heus	Mercedes-AMG GT3	572
22	991-AM	61	(Switzerland) FACH AUTO TECH	(Switzerland) Marcel Wagner (Switzerland) Heinz Bruder (Switzerland) Peter Hegglin (Switzerland) Philipp Frommenwiler (Switzerland) Michael Hirschmann	Porsche 991 GT3 Cup	567
23	A6-AM	33	(Germany) Car Collection Motorsport	(Germany) Dirg Parhofer (Germany) Dimitri Parhofer (France) Rémi Terrail (Germany) Frank Stippler (Spain) Isaac Tutumlu Lopez	Audi R8 LMS	558
24	**TCR**	**130**	(Germany) **Liqui Moly Team Engstler**	(Germany) **Luca Engstler** **(France) Jean-Karl Vernay** **(Germany) Benjamin Leuchter** **(Switzerland) Florian Thoma**	**Volkswagen Golf GTi TCR**	**556**
25	TCR	129	(Finland) LMS Racing by Bas Koeten Racing	(Finland) Olli Kangas (Finland) Kari-Pekka Laaksonen (Finland) Antti Buri (Netherlands) Willem Meijer	SEAT León TCR	554
26	**GT4**	**248**	(Germany) **Phoenix Racing**	(Poland) **Gosia Rdest** **(Finland) Joonas Lappalainen** **(Germany) John-Louis Jasper** **(United Kingdom) Philip Ellis**	**Audi R8 LMS GT**	**551**
27	991-AM	187	(United Arab Emirates) Raceunion	(Germany) Alex Autumn (Germany) Felipe Fernández Laser (Germany) Andreas Gülden (Sweden) Henric Skoog (Germany) Wolfgang Triller	Porsche 991 GT3 Cup	550
28	GT4	247	(Germany) Phoenix Racing	(Hong Kong) Charles Kwan (Hong Kong) Darryl O'Young (Hong Kong) Shaun Thong (Hong Kong) Marchy Lee (Hong Kong) Adderly Fong	Audi R8 LMS GT	550
29	**SP2**	**58**	(Belgium) **VDS Racing Adventures**	(Belgium) **Raphaël van der Straten** **(Belgium) Grégory Paisse** **(Germany) Wolfgang Haugg** **(Belgium) José Close** **(Germany) Karim Al Azari**	**MARC Focus V8**	**549**
30	991-AM	79	(Belgium) Speed Lover	(Netherlands) Marcel van Berlo (Netherlands) Bob Herber (Netherlands) Harry Hilders (Netherlands) Daan Meijer	Porsche 991 GT3 Cup	549
31	GT4	264	(Germany) Black Falcon Team TMD Friction	(Hong Kong) Antares Au (Hong Kong) Jonathan Hui (Hong Kong) Frank Yu (Macau) Kevin Tse	Mercedes-AMG GT R SP-X	548
32	991-PRO	63	(Germany) race:pro motorsport	(Russia) Stanislav Minsky (Germany) Murad Sultanov (Austria) Klaus Bachler (Australia) Nick Foster (Germany) David Jahn	Porsche 991 GT3 Cup	547
33	GT4	233	(Germany) Besagroup Racing	(Croatia) Franjo Kovac (Germany) Cora Schumacher (Germany) Roland Asch (Germany) Sebastian Asch (Germany) Fidel Leib	Mercedes-AMG GT R SP-X	546
34	TCR	115	(Germany) Bonk Motorsport	(Germany) Hermann Bock (Germany) Max Partl (Germany) Rainer Partl (Germany) Michael Bonk (Germany) Volker Piepmeyer	Audi RS3 TCR	544
35 (DNF)	SPX	10	(Germany) Leipert Motorsport	(Lithuania) Tadas Volbikas (Norway) Aleksander Schjerpen (Malaysia) Melvin Moh (Singapore) Lim Keong Wee (United Kingdom) Oliver Webb	Lamborghini Huracán Super Trofeo	541
36	TCR	57	(United Arab Emirates) LAP57 Motorsports	(Sri Lanka) Ashan Silva (United Arab Emirates) Nadir Zuhour (United Arab Emirates) Abdullah Al Hammadi (United Arab Emirates) Mohammed Al Owais	Audi RS3 TCR	538
37	GT4	252	(Germany) Sorg Rennsport	(Germany) Olaf Meyer (Germany) Henry Littig (Germany) Stefan Aust (United States) John Allen (Germany) Max Braams	BMW M4 GT4	534
38	991-AM	69	(Germany) MSG HRT Motorsport	(Germany) Holger Harmsen (Russia) Stanislav Sidoruk (Russia) Andrey Mukovoz (Germany) Kim André Hauschild (Russia) Stepan Krumilov	Porsche 991 GT3 Cup	533
39	GT4	269	(France) 3Y Technology	(France) Eric Mouez (France) David Loger (France) Gregory Pain (France) Michal Fabien	BMW M4 GT4	528
40	SPX	88	(Belgium) Speed Lover	(France) Daniel Desbrueres (Luxembourg) Christian Kelders (Belgium) Jean-Michel Gerome (Belgium) Pierre-Yves Paque	Porsche 991 GT3 Cup	527
41	SP2	201	(Germany) CCS Racing	(Luxembourg) Charel Arendt (Germany) Uwe Schmidt (Luxembourg) Tom Kieffer (Austria) Holger Baumgartner	KTM X-Bow	525
42	TCR	308	(France) Team Altran Peugeot	(Denmark) Kim Holmgaard (Denmark) Michael Carlsen (France) Olivier Baron (France) Guillaume Roman	Peugeot 308 Racing Cup	522
43	SP2	78	(Belgium) Speed Lover	(United States) Dominique Bastien (Spain) Jesus Diez (Luxembourg) Bob Wilwert (Luxembourg) Carlos Rivas	Porsche 991 GT3 Cup	519
44	**SP3**	**178**	(United Kingdom) **CWS Engineering**	(United Kingdom) **Colin White** **(United Kingdom) Jac Constable** **(South Africa) Simon Murray** **(South Africa) Bradley Liebenberg**	**Ginetta G55**	**519**
45	**CUP1**	**131**	(Germany) **Hofor Racing powered by Bonk Motorsport**	(Switzerland) **Martin Kroll** **(Germany) Michael Schrey** **(Austria) Michael Fischer** **(Germany) Bernd Küpper** **(Austria) Gustav Engljähringer**	**BMW M235i Racing Cup**	**519**
46	CUP1	151	(Germany) Sorg Rennsport	(Germany) Stephan Epp (Switzerland) Fabian Danz (United Kingdom) Josh Caygill (Switzerland) Yannick Mettler (Switzerland) Kris Richard	BMW M235i Racing Cup	516
47	CUP1	154	(Belgium) QSR Racingschool	(Germany) Simon Klemund (Belgium) Tom Boonen (Belgium) Rodrigue Gillion (Belgium) Mario Timmers (Belgium) Jimmy de Breucker	BMW M235i Racing Cup	515
48	CUP1	235	(Luxembourg) DUWO Racing	(Luxembourg) Jean-Marie Dumont (France) Frederic Schmit (France) Nicolas Schmit (France) Thierry Chkondali (France) Bruno Derossi	BMW M235i Racing Cup	511
49	A6-AM	85	(Germany) PROsport Performance	(United States) Charles Putman (United States) Charles Espenlaub (United States) Joe Foster (United Kingdom) Adam Christodoulou	Mercedes-AMG GT3	510
50	**A2**	**162**	(United Kingdom) **Ciceley Motorsport**	(United Kingdom) **Adam Morgan** **(United Kingdom) Frank Bird** **(United Kingdom) Max Bird** **(United Kingdom) Jake Giddings**	**Renault Clio Cup IV**	**509**
51	TCR	908	(France) Team Altran Peugeot	(Iran) Aram Martroussian (Denmark) Henrik Sørensen (France) Cyril Calmon (France) Lionel Amrouche	Peugeot 308 Racing Cup	509
52 (DNF)	SPX	87	(United Arab Emirates) GDL Racing Middle East	(France) Franck Pelle (United States) Vic Rice (Italy) Massimo Vignali (Finland) Rory Penttinen	Lamborghini Huracán Super Trofeo	508
53	TCR	55	(United Arab Emirates) Atech - DXB	(United Kingdom) Julian Griffin (United Kingdom) Will Morrison (United Kingdom) Colin Boyle (United Kingdom) Jonathan Simmonds	SEAT León TCR	506
54 (DNF)	A6-PRO	3	(Germany) Black Falcon	(Germany) Manuel Metzger (Germany) Luca Stolz (Netherlands) Jeroen Bleekemolen (United Arab Emirates) Khaled Al Qubaisi	Mercedes-AMG GT3	502
55	CUP1	152	(Germany) Sorg Rennsport	(China) Stephen Gu (China) Li Fei (Germany) Stefan Beyer (Germany) Christoph Hewer (United States) Cameron Lawrence	BMW M235i Racing Cup	502
56 (DNF)	TCR	216	(Hong Kong) Modena Motorsports	(Canada) Wayne Shen (Canada) John Shen (Netherlands) Francis Tjia (Denmark) Benny Simonsen (Switzerland) Mathias Beche	SEAT León TCR	500
57	A6-AM	7	(Germany) Black Falcon	(Saudi Arabia) Saeed Al Mouri (Saudi Arabia) Saud Al Faisal (Portugal) Rui Águas (Greece) Kriton Lendoudis	Mercedes-AMG GT3	499
58	SP2	60	(France) LAMERA-CUP	(France) Philippe Marie (France) Christophe Bouchut (France) Pierre Couasnon (France) Wilfried Merafina	Lamera Cup	499
59	SP3	238	(France) LAMERA-CUP	(France) Nicolas Beraud (France) Fabien Delaplace (France) Laurent Piguet (France) Stephane Pasquet	Lamera Cup	498
60 (DNF)	991-AM	90	(Germany) MRS GT-Racing	(United States) Alex Welch (France) Thierry Blaise (France) Olivier Baharian (Switzerland) Manuel Nicolaidis	Porsche 991 GT3 Cup	491
61	TCR	125	(Netherlands) Bas Koeten Racing	(Belgium) Anthony Lambert (Netherlands) Mathijs Bakker (Switzerland) Ronny Jost (United Kingdom) J.M. Littman	Audi RS 3 TCR	491
62	SP3	278	(United Kingdom) CWS	(United Kingdom) Adam Hayes (United Kingdom) Steven Wells (United Kingdom) Paul May (United Kingdom) James May	Ginetta G55	484
63 (DNF)	A6-AM	1	(Switzerland) Hofor-Racing	(Netherlands) Christiaan Frankenhout (Germany) Kenneth Heyer (Switzerland) Roland Eggimann (Switzerland) Chantal Kroll (Switzerland) Michael Kroll	Mercedes-AMG GT3	483
64 (DNF)	A6-AM	24	(Germany) SPS automotive performance	(Switzerland) Antonin Borga (Switzerland) Richard Feller (Switzerland) Iradj Alexander (Switzerland) Alexandre Coigny	Mercedes-AMG GT3	481
65	A2	171	(Denmark) Jönsson Consulting	(Denmark) Søren Jönsson (Denmark) Lars Mogensen (Denmark) Niels Nyboe (Denmark) Kasper Bruun (Denmark) Christian Hansen	Peugeot RCZ	476
66	SP3	229	(United Kingdom) Century Motorsport	(United Kingdom) Dominic Paul (United Kingdom) Mark Farmer (United Kingdom) Jon Barnes (United Kingdom) Nathan Freke	Ginetta G55	475
67 (DNF)	SP2	246	KTM M Motorsport Australia	(Australia) Justin McMillan (Australia) Glen Wood (Netherlands) Peter Kox (Netherlands) Nico Pronk	KTM X-Bow GT4 (SP2)	470
68	A6-AM	991	Gulf Racing Japan	(Canada) Bashar Mardini (Austria) Philipp Sager (Japan) Hisashi Kunie (Japan) Kimihiro Yashiro (Belgium) Nicolas Saelens	Porsche 911 GT3 R	468
69	GT4	268	(France) 3Y Technology	(France) Nyls Stievenart (France) Michael Petit (France) Philippe Chatelet (France) Éric Cayrolle	BMW M4 GT4	451
70	A2	164	(United Kingdom) Ciceley Motorsport	(United Kingdom) Max Coates (Germany) Harald Rettich (United Kingdom) Adam Hatfield (Denmark) Steffan Jusjong	Renault Clio Cup IV	436
71	GT4	239	(Denmark) Perfection Racing Europe	(Denmark) Claus Klostermann (Denmark) Michael Klostermann (Denmark) René Rasmussen (Denmark) Tommy Laugesen	Ginetta G55 GT4	421
72 (DNF)	TCR	212	(Switzerland) Stanco and Tanner Motorsport by Autorama Wetzikon	(Switzerland) Rudolf Rhyn (Australia) Cody Hill (Germany) Marlon Menden (Switzerland) Adrian Spescha (Switzerland) Stefan Tanner	SEAT León TCR	411
73 (DNF)	A6-PRO	66	(Germany) Attempto Racing	(Austria) Clemens Schmid (Netherlands) Pieter Schothorst (Netherlands) Steijn Schothorst (Spain) Alex Riberas (Germany) Edward Lewis Brauner	Lamborghini Huracán GT3	403
74	SP3	237	(France) LAMERA-CUP	(France) Herve Dumas (France) Gaël Penelon (France) Eric Darne (France) Thomas Merafina Giboudeaux	Lamera Cup	396
75 (DNF)	TCR	303	(Netherlands) Red Camel-Jordans.nl	(Germany) Dirk Vorländer (Netherlands) Ivo Breukers (Russia) Maxim Aronov (Russia) Lev Fridman	SEAT León TCR	388
76 (DNF)	SPX	77	(Singapore) GDL Racing Team Asia	(Netherlands) Richard Verburg (Singapore) Gerald Tan (Hong Kong) Nigel Farmer (Singapore) Lim Keong Liam	Lamborghini Huracán Super Trofeo	376
77	991-PRO	82	(Russia) RScar Motorsport	(Russia) Artem Soloviev (Russia) Vadim Meshcheriakov (Russia) Denis Gromov (Russia) Roman Rusinov	Porsche 991 GT3 Cup	364
78 (DNF)	GT4	84	(Germany) Team RACE SCOUT by Winward / HTP Motorsport	(United States) Russell Ward (United States) Bryce Ward (Germany) Christian Gebhardt (Argentina) Norberto Fontana (Germany) Bernd Schneider	Mercedes-AMG GT R SPX	342
79 (DNF)	GT4	40	(United Kingdom) Brookspeed International Motorsport	(United States) James McGuire (United Kingdom) Ian James (United Kingdom) Matt Bell (United States) John Schauerman (Brazil) Pierre Kleinubing	Porsche Cayman GT4 Clubsport MR	339
80	SP3	71	(Netherlands) Cor Euser Racing	(Netherlands) Cor Euser (Norway) Einar Thorsen (United States) McKay Snow (Germany) Klaus Dieter Frommer	BMW M3 (E46)	327
Not classified in A6-PRO
DNF	A6-PRO	5	(United Kingdom) Ram Racing	(United Kingdom) Euan Hankey (United Kingdom) Tom Onslow-Cole (Netherlands) Remon Leonard Vos	Mercedes-AMG GT3	101
DNS	A6-PRO	96	(United Kingdom) Optimum Motorsport	(United Kingdom) Oliver Wilkinson (United Kingdom) Bradley Ellis (Germany) Christopher Haase	Audi R8 LMS	
Not classified in A6-AM
DNF	A6-AM	28	(United Arab Emirates) GP Extreme	(France) Jean-Pierre Valentini (Zimbabwe) Axcil Jefferies (Netherlands) Nicky Pastorelli (France) Alban Varutti (Canada) Bassam Kronfli	Renault RS01 GT3	19
Not classified in 991-AM
DNF	991-AM	111	(United Kingdom) track-club	(United Kingdom) Ryan Ratcliffe (United Kingdom) Andrew Gordon-Colebrooke (United Kingdom) Marcus Jewell (United Kingdom) Adam Balon	Porsche 991 GT3 Cup	142
Not classified in GT4
DNF	GT4	111	(Sweden) ALFAB Racing	(Sweden) Erik Behrens (Sweden) Daniel Ros (Sweden) Fredrik Ros (Sweden) Anders Lewin	McLaren 570S GT4	197
Not classified in TCR
DNF	TCR	112	(Switzerland) Stanco and Tanner Motorsport by Autorama Wetzikon	(Switzerland) Stefan Tanner (Italy) Luigi Stanco (Switzerland) Ralf Henggeler (United Kingdom) Andrew Mollison (Switzerland) Rudolf Rhyn	Audi RS 3 TCR	282
DNF	TCR	99	(United Kingdom) RKC/TGM Motorsport	(United Kingdom) Ricky Coomber (United Kingdom) Thomas Gannon (United Kingdom) David Drinkwater (Pakistan) Umair Ahmed Khan	Honda Civic Type R TCR	260
DNF	TCR	888	(Belgium) AC Motorsport	(France) Stephane Perrin (France) Alexandre Renneteau (Belgium) Vincent Radermecker (Latvia) Reinis Nitišs	Audi RS 3 TCR	158
DNS	TCR	127	(Germany) Bonk Motorsport	(Germany) Michael Bonk (Germany) Volker Piepmeyer (Germany) Axel Burghardt (Germany) Simon Wirth	Audi RS 3 TCR	
Not classified in SP3
DNF	SP3	786	(Denmark) Scangrip Racing	(Denmark) Niels Borum (Denmark) Anders Lund (Denmark) Sune Marcussen (Denmark) Michael Nielsen	BMW 335i Coupe (E92)	146
DNF	SP3	232	(United Kingdom) Optimum Motorsport	(United Kingdom) Adrian Barwick (United Kingdom) William Moore (United Kingdom) Marc Brough (United Kingdom) Charlie Hollings	Ginetta G55 GT4	118
