= Ian Loggie =

Scottish businessman and racing driver (born 1962)

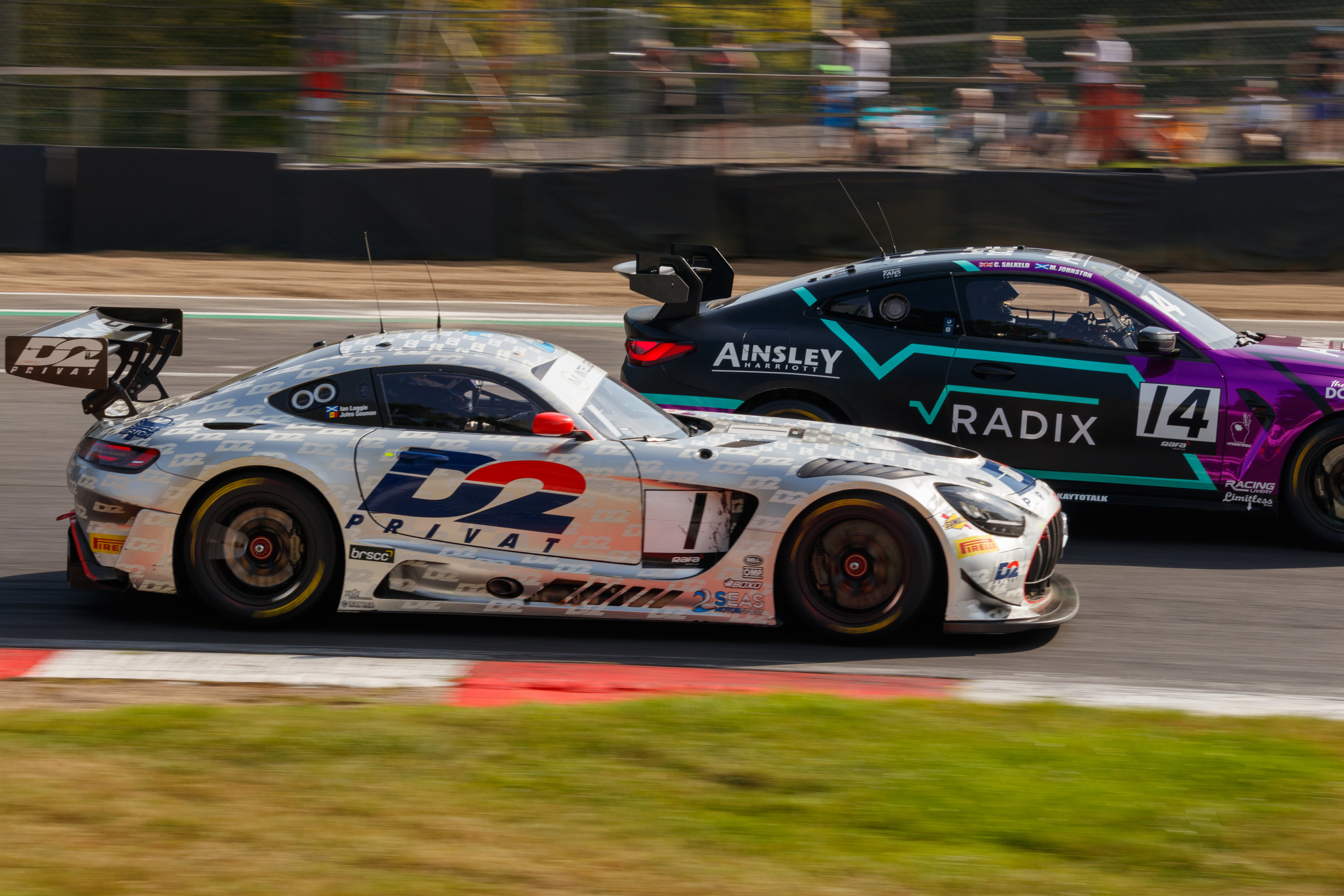
- Loggie in 2023
- Nationality: (United Kingdom) British
- Born: 1 November 1962 (age 64) Scotland

British GT Championship career
- Debut season: 2015
- Current team: 2 Seas Motorsport
- Categorisation: FIA Bronze
- Car number: 1

Championship titles
- 2013 2015 2022 2022: Britcar; Blancpain Am Cup; Asian Le Mans Series GT Am; British GT Championship
Medal record
GT3
Representing United Kingdom
FIA Motorsport Games
Bronze medal – third place	2022 Le Castellet	GT Cup

John "Ian" Loggie (born 1 November 1962) is a Scottish businessman and racing driver. After starting racing in 2013, he won the Britcar championship in the same year. He then won the Am Cup category of the Blancpain Endurance Series in 2015. In 2022, he won the Asian Le Mans Series GT Am championship and the British GT Championship in the GT3 category. He also won the bronze medal at the 2022 FIA Motorsport Games GT Cup.

== Racing career ==
Loggie began his racing career in 2013 and that year, he won Britcar championship alongside Chris Jones. He then began racing in the Blancpain Endurance Series (now the GT World Challenge Europe Endurance Cup) in 2014, driving an Audi R8 LMS ultra for Team Parker Racing. At the 2015 24 Hours of Spa, the Am Cup was won by the No. 24 Audi R8 LMS ultra of Team Parker, driven by Loggie, Callum MacLeod, Benny Simonsen and Julian Westwood. Loggie and Westwood won the 2015 series in the Am Cup category.

Loggie began racing at the British GT Championship in 2015, where he was signed to Team Parker Racing up to the 2018 season. In 2019, he signed with Ram Racing. With this team, Loggie won the 2022 championship, winning two races in the process during that season. Also in October of that year, he joined Sam Neary behind the wheel of Team United Kingdom's GT Relay entry into the 2022 FIA Motorsport Games. The duo finished second and fourth in the two qualifying races, before winning the bronze medal in the main race.

For the 2023 season, Loggie signed with 2 Seas Motorsport. He also made an appearance in the Formula 4 South East Asia Championship.

Sporting positions
Preceded by Dennis Lind; Leo Machitski	British GT Championship; Champion; 2022	Succeeded by Darren Leung; Dan Harper
