= Steve Jans =

Luxembourgish racing driver (born 1988)

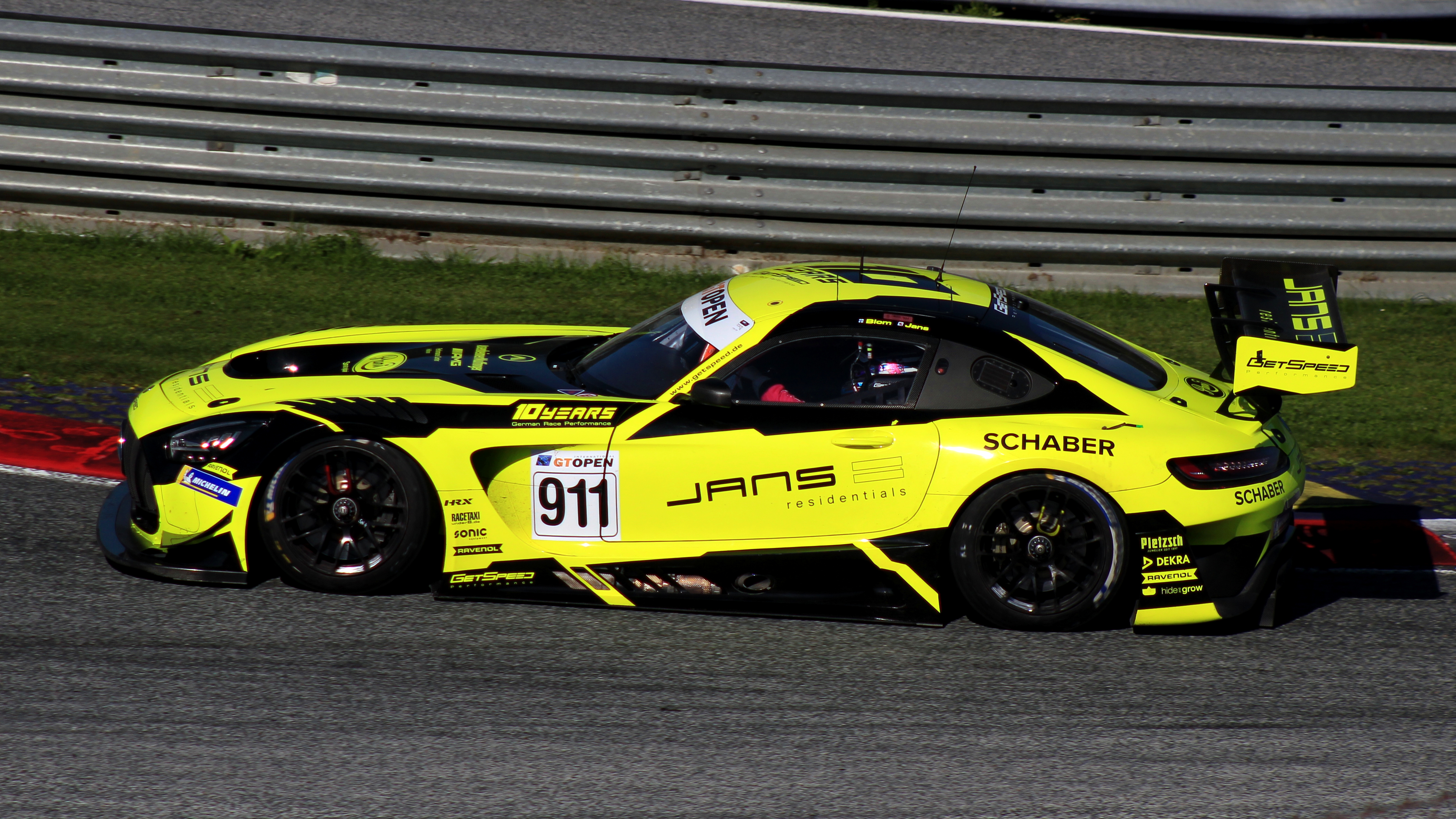
- Jans in 2023
- Nationality: (Luxembourg) Luxembourgish
- Born: 25 October 1988 (age 38) Wiltz, Luxembourg
- Categorisation: FIA Bronze (2012–2013, 2023–); FIA Silver (2014–2022)

Championship titles
- 2019: VLN Series – SP9 Pro-Am

Steve Jans (born 25 October 1988) is a Luxembourgish businessman and racing driver who last competed for GetSpeed Performance in the GT class of the Asian Le Mans Series.

== Business career ==
Jans is the managing director of the Jans Group, having taken it over in 2017 from his father Claude, who founded the company in 1991.

== Racing career ==
Jans made his car racing debut in the 2011 24 Hours of Nürburgring, in which he finished 43rd overall and fourth in the V5 class for Black Falcon. The following year, Jans remained with the team to race in the Blancpain Endurance Series. Racing in the Pro-Am class, Jans scored his only class win of the season at the Nürburgring and finished third in class at Navarra to end the year 11th in points.

Staying with Black Falcon for 2013, Jans began the year by finishing fourth in the Dubai 24 Hours, before heading back to Europe to race for the team in the Blancpain Endurance Series. In his sophomore season in the series, Jans scored class podiums at Monza and Nürburgring, and also finished fourth in class at the 24 Hours of Spa, helping him to finish sixth in the Pro-Am standings. During 2013, Jans also raced with the same team at the 24 Hours of Nürburgring, finishing 15th overall and fourth in the SP7 class.

Over the next seven years, Jans mainly raced in the Nürburgring Langstrecken-Serie, most notably winning the SP9 Pro-Am title in 2019 for Phoenix Racing, and raced in the 24 Hours of Nürburgring four times, finishing no higher than seventh in class.

In 2022, Jans made his full-time return to racing by joining GetSpeed Performance to race in International GT Open alongside Sébastien Baud. Racing in the Pro class for all but two rounds, the pair scored overall podiums at the Red Bull Ring, Monza and Barcelona to end the year fourth in the overall standings. Remaining with GetSpeed Performance for 2023, Jans joined Axel Blom for his sophomore season in International GT Open. Racing in the Pro-Am class, Jans took his maiden class win at Monza and scored four more podiums to end the year third in points.

The following year, Jans mainly competed in the Porsche Endurance Trophy Nürburgring Cup for Black Falcon and also returning to the 24 Hours of Nürburgring, in which he finished tenth in the Cup2 Pro class. During the year, Jans also returned to GetSpeed Performance for a one-off appearance in the Le Mans Cup alongside Anthony Bartone, and returned with them to contest the 2024–25 Asian Le Mans Series in the GT class.

For the rest of 2025, Jans joined Aaron Walker to race for GetSpeed in the Pro-Am class of International GT Open. In his third season in the series, Jans scored class wins at Spa, Hockenheimring, Hungaroring and Barcelona to claim runner-up spots in the Pro-Am class at season's end. During 2025, Jans raced with the team in a one-off appearance in the 24 Hours of Le Mans-supporting round of the Le Mans Cup, in which he and co-driver Anthony Bartone won race one, and also finished second in the Pro-Am class at the Suzuka 1000 km alongside Philip Ellis and Anthony McIntosh.

Jans remained with GetSpeed Performance to contest the 2025–26 Asian Le Mans Series, albeit only taking part in the UAE-based rounds due to family-related matters forcing him to be replaced by Shigekazu Wakisaka for the season-opening Sepang round. In those two rounds, Jans qualified on pole for both races at Abu Dhabi and scored a best result of second in race two of that round. Going back to Europe for the rest of 2026, Jans raced with GetSpeed for most of the 24H Series, taking a GT3 Am win at the 12 Hours of Nürburgring in class and scoring two other podiums to end the year third in class. At the end of the year, Jans continued with GetSpeed to race in the GT3 class of the 2026–27 Asian Le Mans Series.

== Racing record ==
=== Racing career summary ===
Season	Series	Team	Races	Wins	Poles	F/Laps	Podiums	Points	Position
2011	24 Hours of Nürburgring – V5	Black Falcon Team TMD Friction	1	0	0	0	0	—N/a	4th
2012	Blancpain Endurance Series – Pro-Am	Black Falcon	6	1	0	0	2	46	11th
2012	24 Hours of Nürburgring – V6	Regal Motorsports	1	0	0	0	0	—N/a	4th
2013	Dubai 24 Hour	Team Abu Dhabi by Black Falcon	1	0	0	0	0	—N/a	4th
2013	Blancpain Endurance Series – Pro-Am	Black Falcon	4	0	0	0	2	50	6th
2013	24 Hours of Nürburgring – SP7	Black Falcon Team TMD Friction	1	0	0	0	0	—N/a	4th
2013	British GT Championship – GT3	Fortec Motorsports	1	0	0	0	0	0	NC
2014	24 Hours of Nürburgring – SP7	GetSpeed Performance	1	0	0	0	0	—N/a	7th
2015	VLN Series – SP7	GetSpeed Performance	8	1	0	1	4	30.46	11th
2016	24 Hours of Nürburgring – SP7	GetSpeed Performance	1	0	0	0	0	—N/a	DNF
2018	VLN Series – SP7	Gigaspeed Team GetSpeed Performance	8	0	0	0	0	45.66	70th
2018	24 Hours of Nürburgring – SP9	Gigaspeed Team GetSpeed Performance	1	0	0	0	0	—N/a	15th
2019	VLN Series – SP9 Pro-Am	Phoenix Racing	6	3	0	0	5	39.66	**1st**
2019	24 Hours of Nürburgring – SP9 Pro	IronForce by Ring Police	1	0	0	0	0	—N/a	11th
2021	Nürburgring Langstrecken-Serie – SP10	Waldow Performance	1	0	0	0	0	0	NC
2022	International GT Open	GetSpeed Performance	13	0	0	0	3	64	4th
2022	International GT Open – Pro-Am	GetSpeed Performance	3	0	0	0	1	12	11th
2023	International GT Open	GetSpeed Performance	13	0	0	0	0	22	13th
2023	International GT Open – Pro-Am	GetSpeed Performance	13	1	0	0	4	58	**3rd**
2023–24	Asian Le Mans Series – GT	GetSpeed Performance	2	0	0	0	0	4	28th
2024	Porsche Endurance Trophy Nürburgring Cup2	Black Falcon	7	3	1	3	6	121	**3rd**
2024	24 Hours of Nürburgring – Cup2 Pro	Black Falcon Team 48 LOSCH	1	0	0	0	0	—N/a	10th
2024	Le Mans Cup – GT3	GetSpeed	2	0	0	0	0	0	NC
2024–25	Asian Le Mans Series – GT	GetSpeed Performance	6	0	0	0	0	7	21st
2025	International GT Open	GetSpeed Performance	14	0	0	0	0	23	14th
2025	International GT Open – Pro-Am	GetSpeed Performance	14	4	1	0	6	89	**2nd**
2025	Le Mans Cup – GT3	GetSpeed Performance	2	1	1	0	1	0	NC†
2025	Intercontinental GT Challenge	GetSpeed Performance	1	0	0	0	0	0	NC
2025–26	Asian Le Mans Series – GT	GetSpeed Performance	4	0	2	0	1	36	11th
2026	24H Series – GT3 Am	GetSpeed Team JR286	4	1	0	0	3	148	**3rd**
2026	Le Mans Cup – GT3	GetSpeed	1	0	0	0	1	0	NC†
2026–27	Asian Le Mans Series – GT3	GetSpeed						*	*
2027	Kyalami 24 Hours – GT3 Am	GetSpeed Performance						—N/a	

=== Complete Blancpain GT Series Endurance Cup results ===
Year	Entrant	Car	Class	1	2	3	4	5	6	7	8	Rank	Points
2012	Black Falcon	Mercedes-Benz SLS AMG GT3	Pro-Am	MNZ; 44	SIL; 15	LEC; 25	SPA; 6H ?	SPA; 12H ?	SPA; 24H; Ret	NÜR; 6	NAV; 13	11th	46
2013	Black Falcon	Mercedes-Benz SLS AMG GT3	Pro-Am	MNZ; 10	SIL; Ret	LEC; Ret	SPA; 6H ?	SPA; 12H ?	SPA; 24H; 8	NÜR; 13		6th	50

=== Complete International GT Open results ===
(key) (Races in bold indicate pole position) (Races in italics indicate fastest lap)

Year	Team	Car	Class	1	2	3	4	5	6	7	8	9	10	11	12	13	14	Pos.	Points
2022	GetSpeed Performance	Mercedes-AMG GT3 Evo	Pro-Am			LEC; 1; 4	LEC; 2; 2	SPA; Ret										11th	12
2022	GetSpeed Performance	Mercedes-AMG GT3 Evo	Pro	EST; 1 Ret	EST; 2; 6				HUN; 1; 15	HUN; 2; 10	RBR; 1; 5	RBR; 2; 2	MNZ; 1; 6	MNZ; 2; 3	CAT; 1; 12	CAT; 2; 2		4th	64
2023	GetSpeed Performance	Mercedes-AMG GT3 Evo	Pro-Am	ALG; 1; 2	ALG; 2; 4	SPA; 6	HUN; 1; 2	HUN; 2; 7	LEC; 1 Ret	LEC; 2; 5	RBR; 1; 4	RBR; 2; 7	MNZ; 1; 1	MNZ; 2; 3	CAT; 1; 2	CAT; 2; 5		3rd	58
2025	GetSpeed Performance	Mercedes-AMG GT3 Evo	Pro-Am	ALG; 1; 3	ALG; 2; 5	SPA; 1	HOC; 1; 1	HOC; 2; 7	HUN; 1; 5	HUN; 2; 1	LEC; 1; 8	LEC; 2; 4	RBR; 1; 9	RBR; 2; 2	CAT; 1; 4	CAT; 2; 1	**MNZ**; Ret	2nd	89

=== Complete Asian Le Mans Series results ===
(key) (Races in bold indicate pole position) (Races in italics indicate fastest lap)

Year	Team	Class	Car	Engine	1	2	3	4	5	6	Pos.	Points
2023–24	GetSpeed Performance	GT	Mercedes-AMG GT3 Evo	Mercedes-AMG M159 6.2 L V8	SEP; 1; 8	SEP; 2 Ret	DUB	ABU; 1	ABU; 2		28th	4
2024–25	GetSpeed Performance	GT	Mercedes-AMG GT3 Evo	Mercedes-AMG M159 6.2 L V8	SEP; 1; 15	SEP; 2; 7	DUB; 1; 24	DUB; 2; 16	ABU; 1 Ret	ABU; 2; 17	21st	7
2025–26	GetSpeed Performance	GT	Mercedes-AMG GT3 Evo	Mercedes-AMG M159 6.2 L V8	SEP; 1	SEP; 2	DUB; 1; 7	DUB; 2; 6	**ABU**; **1** Ret	**ABU**; **2**; 2	11th	36
