= 2024 International GT Open =

The 2024 International GT Open was the nineteenth season of the International GT Open, the grand tourer-style sports car racing series founded in 2006 by the Spanish GT Sport Organización. It began on 27 April at the Algarve International Circuit and ended at the Autodromo Nazionale di Monza on 20 October after eight rounds.

== Calendar ==
Round		Circuit	Date	Support bill	Map of circuit locations
1	R1	(Portugal) Algarve International Circuit, Portimão	27–28 April	Euroformula Open Championship; GT Cup Open Europe; Alpine Elf Europa Cup; Renault Clio Cup Series	2024 International GT Open is located in Europe
1	R2	(Portugal) Algarve International Circuit, Portimão	27–28 April	Euroformula Open Championship; GT Cup Open Europe; Alpine Elf Europa Cup; Renault Clio Cup Series	2024 International GT Open is located in Europe
2	R1	(Germany) Hockenheimring, Hockenheim	11–12 May	Formula Regional European Championship; Euroformula Open Championship; GT Cup Open Europe; Renault Clio Cup Series	2024 International GT Open is located in Europe
2	R2	(Germany) Hockenheimring, Hockenheim	11–12 May	Formula Regional European Championship; Euroformula Open Championship; GT Cup Open Europe; Renault Clio Cup Series	2024 International GT Open is located in Europe
3		(Belgium) Circuit de Spa-Francorchamps, Stavelot	25–26 May	Formula Regional European Championship; Euroformula Open Championship; GT Cup Open Europe	2024 International GT Open is located in Europe
4	R1	(Hungary) Hungaroring, Mogyoród	22–23 June	Formula Regional European Championship; Euroformula Open Championship; Porsche Carrera Cup Germany; GB3 Championship	2024 International GT Open is located in Europe
4	R2	(Hungary) Hungaroring, Mogyoród	22–23 June	Formula Regional European Championship; Euroformula Open Championship; Porsche Carrera Cup Germany; GB3 Championship	2024 International GT Open is located in Europe
5	R1	(France) Circuit Paul Ricard, Le Castellet	20–21 July	Formula Regional European Championship; Euroformula Open Championship; Italian F4 Championship; GT Cup Open Europe	2024 International GT Open is located in Europe
5	R2	(France) Circuit Paul Ricard, Le Castellet	20–21 July	Formula Regional European Championship; Euroformula Open Championship; Italian F4 Championship; GT Cup Open Europe	2024 International GT Open is located in Europe
6	R1	(Austria) Red Bull Ring, Spielberg	14–15 September	Formula Regional European Championship; Euroformula Open Championship; Euro 4 Championship; Porsche Carrera Cup Benelux	2024 International GT Open is located in Europe
6	R2	(Austria) Red Bull Ring, Spielberg	14–15 September	Formula Regional European Championship; Euroformula Open Championship; Euro 4 Championship; Porsche Carrera Cup Benelux	2024 International GT Open is located in Europe
7	R1	(Spain) Circuit de Barcelona-Catalunya, Montmeló	28–29 September	Formula Regional European Championship; Euroformula Open Championship; Italian F4 Championship; GT Cup Open Europe	2024 International GT Open is located in Europe
7	R2	(Spain) Circuit de Barcelona-Catalunya, Montmeló	28–29 September	Formula Regional European Championship; Euroformula Open Championship; Italian F4 Championship; GT Cup Open Europe	2024 International GT Open is located in Europe
8		(Italy) Autodromo Nazionale di Monza, Monza	19–20 October	Euroformula Open Championship; GT Cup Open Europe; Alpine Elf Europa Cup; Renault Clio Cup Series	2024 International GT Open is located in Europe

== Entry list ==
Team	Car	No.	Drivers	Class	Rounds
(Austria) Eastalent Racing Team	Audi R8 LMS Evo II	1	(Germany) Christopher Haase	P	All
(Austria) Eastalent Racing Team	Audi R8 LMS Evo II	1	(Austria) Simon Reicher	P	All
(Poland) Olimp Racing	Ferrari 296 GT3	5	(Poland) Krystian Korzeniowski	Am	All
(Poland) Olimp Racing	Ferrari 296 GT3	5	(Poland) Stanisław Jedliński	Am	All
(Poland) Olimp Racing	Audi R8 LMS Evo II	777	(Poland) Karol Basz	PA	All
(Poland) Olimp Racing	Audi R8 LMS Evo II	777	(Poland) Marcin Jedliński	PA	All
(Germany) GetSpeed	Mercedes-AMG GT3 Evo	6	(Germany) Valentin Pierburg	PA	All
(Germany) GetSpeed	Mercedes-AMG GT3 Evo	6	(United Kingdom) Aaron Walker	PA	All
(Germany) GetSpeed	Mercedes-AMG GT3 Evo	9	(United States) Anthony Bartone	P	All
(Germany) GetSpeed	Mercedes-AMG GT3 Evo	9	(Germany) Fabian Schiller	P	All
(Germany) GetSpeed	Mercedes-AMG GT3 Evo	786	(Thailand) Kiki Sak Nana	Am	All
(Germany) GetSpeed	Mercedes-AMG GT3 Evo	786	(Germany) Adam Osieka	Am	All
(Germany) Vimana by GetSpeed	Mercedes-AMG GT3 Evo	108	(United Kingdom) Tom Jackson	PA	1, 5, 7–8
(Germany) Vimana by GetSpeed	Mercedes-AMG GT3 Evo	108	(Zimbabwe) Ameerh Naran	PA	1, 5, 7–8
(Oman) Al Manar Racing by GetSpeed	Mercedes-AMG GT3 Evo	77	(Oman) Al Faisal Al Zubair	P	1, 3
(Oman) Al Manar Racing by GetSpeed	Mercedes-AMG GT3 Evo	77	(Canada) Mikaël Grenier	P	1, 3
(Germany) Car Collection Motorsport	Porsche 911 GT3 R (992)	7	(Kuwait) Bashar Mardini	PA	All
(Germany) Car Collection Motorsport	Porsche 911 GT3 R (992)	7	(Netherlands) Tijmen van der Helm	PA	1, 3, 5–8
(Germany) Car Collection Motorsport	Porsche 911 GT3 R (992)	7	(Sweden) Emil Persson	PA	4
(Germany) Car Collection Motorsport	Porsche 911 GT3 R (992)	12	(United States) "Hash"	PA	All
(Germany) Car Collection Motorsport	Porsche 911 GT3 R (992)	12	(Switzerland) Alex Fontana	PA	All
(Germany) Car Collection Motorsport	Porsche 911 GT3 R (992)	15	(Sweden) Gustav Bergström	P	All
(Germany) Car Collection Motorsport	Porsche 911 GT3 R (992)	15	(Germany) Nico Menzel	P	All
(Italy) Il Barone Rampante	Lamborghini Huracán GT3 Evo	8	(Italy) Giuseppe Cipriani	Am	1–7
(Italy) Il Barone Rampante	Lamborghini Huracán GT3 Evo	8	(Kyrgyzstan) Dmitriy Gvazava (Note: Gvazava is Russian, but he competes under a Kyrgyz licence respectively as Russian national emblems were banned by the FIA following the Russian invasion of Ukraine.)	Am	3
(Italy) Il Barone Rampante	Lamborghini Huracán GT3 Evo	8	(Italy) Giuseppe Cipriani	PA	8
(Italy) Il Barone Rampante	Lamborghini Huracán GT3 Evo	8	(Brazil) Rubens Barrichello	PA	8
(Italy) Oregon Team	Lamborghini Huracán GT3 Evo 2	10	(Italy) Alessio Deledda	P	All
(Italy) Oregon Team	Lamborghini Huracán GT3 Evo 2	10	(South Africa) Jordan Pepper	P	1–3, 5–8
(Italy) Oregon Team	Lamborghini Huracán GT3 Evo 2	10	(Germany) Maximilian Paul	P	4
(Italy) Oregon Team	Lamborghini Huracán GT3 Evo 2	19	(Italy) Marzio Moretti	P	All
(Italy) Oregon Team	Lamborghini Huracán GT3 Evo 2	19	(Israel) Artem Petrov (Note: Petrov is Russian, but competes under an Israeli license as Russian national emblems were banned by the FIA following the Russian invasion of Ukraine. For the same reason Borodin and Lomko competes as a neutral athletes.)	P	All
(Italy) Oregon Team	Lamborghini Huracán GT3 Evo 2	63	(Italy) Leonardo Pulcini	P	All
(Italy) Oregon Team	Lamborghini Huracán GT3 Evo 2	63	(Switzerland) Rolf Ineichen	P	1–3, 6, 8
(Italy) Oregon Team	Lamborghini Huracán GT3 Evo 2	63	(Germany) Simon Connor Primm	P	4
(Italy) Oregon Team	Lamborghini Huracán GT3 Evo 2	63	(Belgium) Amaury Bonduel	P	5
(Italy) Oregon Team	Lamborghini Huracán GT3 Evo 2	63	(Italy) Alberto Di Folco	P	7
(Germany) racing one	Ferrari 296 GT3	11	(Austria) Ernst Kirchmayr	PA	1–6
(Germany) racing one	Ferrari 296 GT3	11	(Germany) Luca Ludwig	PA	1–3
(Germany) racing one	Ferrari 296 GT3	11	(Italy) David Fumanelli	PA	4–5
(Germany) racing one	Ferrari 296 GT3	11	(Italy) Giacomo Altoè	PA	6
(Poland) Good Speed Racing Team	Mercedes-AMG GT3 Evo	14	(Netherlands) "Daan Arrow"	PA	5–7
(Poland) Good Speed Racing Team	Mercedes-AMG GT3 Evo	14	(Poland) Piotr Wira	PA	5–7
(Italy) AF Corse (Note: Car No. 16, 25, 55 and 61 entered as AF Corse, car No. 27, 51 and 88 entered as Spirit of Race and car No. 47 entered as Cetilar Racing) (Switzerland) Spirit of Race (Italy) Cetilar Racing	Ferrari 296 GT3	16	(Brazil) Marcelo Hahn	PA	All
(Italy) AF Corse (Switzerland) Spirit of Race (Italy) Cetilar Racing	Ferrari 296 GT3	16	(Brazil) Allam Khodair	PA	All
(Italy) AF Corse (Switzerland) Spirit of Race (Italy) Cetilar Racing	Ferrari 296 GT3	25	(Italy) Alessandro Cozzi	PA	1–7
(Italy) AF Corse (Switzerland) Spirit of Race (Italy) Cetilar Racing	Ferrari 296 GT3	25	(Italy) Giorgio Sernagiotto	PA	1–3, 5–7
(Italy) AF Corse (Switzerland) Spirit of Race (Italy) Cetilar Racing	Ferrari 296 GT3	25	(Italy) Eliseo Donno	PA	4
(Italy) AF Corse (Switzerland) Spirit of Race (Italy) Cetilar Racing	Ferrari 296 GT3	27	(Italy) Marco Pulcini	PA	1–7
(Italy) AF Corse (Switzerland) Spirit of Race (Italy) Cetilar Racing	Ferrari 296 GT3	27	(Italy) Eddie Cheever III	PA	1–4, 6–7
(Italy) AF Corse (Switzerland) Spirit of Race (Italy) Cetilar Racing	Ferrari 296 GT3	27	(Italy) Riccardo Agostini	PA	5
(Italy) AF Corse (Switzerland) Spirit of Race (Italy) Cetilar Racing	Ferrari 296 GT3	47	(Italy) Roberto Lacorte	Am	5
(Italy) AF Corse (Switzerland) Spirit of Race (Italy) Cetilar Racing	Ferrari 296 GT3	51	(Monaco) Vincent Abril	P	All
(Italy) AF Corse (Switzerland) Spirit of Race (Italy) Cetilar Racing	Ferrari 296 GT3	51	(Italy) Nicola Marinangeli	P	All
(Italy) AF Corse (Switzerland) Spirit of Race (Italy) Cetilar Racing	Ferrari 296 GT3	61	(United States) Conrad Grunewald	PA	1–3
(Italy) AF Corse (Switzerland) Spirit of Race (Italy) Cetilar Racing	Ferrari 296 GT3	61	(United States) Jean-Claude Saada	PA	1–3
(Italy) AF Corse (Switzerland) Spirit of Race (Italy) Cetilar Racing	Ferrari 296 GT3	61	(United States) Ziad Ghandour	Am	6
(Italy) AF Corse (Switzerland) Spirit of Race (Italy) Cetilar Racing	Ferrari 296 GT3	88	(Switzerland) Gino Forgione	PA	1–4, 6–8
(Italy) AF Corse (Switzerland) Spirit of Race (Italy) Cetilar Racing	Ferrari 296 GT3	88	(Italy) Michele Rugolo	PA	1–4, 6–8
(Italy) AF Corse (Switzerland) Spirit of Race (Italy) Cetilar Racing	Ferrari 488 GT3 Evo 2020 1 Ferrari 296 GT3 2–8	55	(Belgium) Laurent de Meeus	PA	All
(Italy) AF Corse (Switzerland) Spirit of Race (Italy) Cetilar Racing	Ferrari 488 GT3 Evo 2020 1 Ferrari 296 GT3 2–8	55	(United Kingdom) Jamie Stanley	PA	All
(Germany) Team Motopark	Mercedes-AMG GT3 Evo	17	(Mexico) Diego Menchaca	P	All
(Germany) Team Motopark	Mercedes-AMG GT3 Evo	17	(Argentina) Marcos Siebert	P	All
(Germany) Team Motopark	Mercedes-AMG GT3 Evo	65	(Germany) Heiko Neumann	Am	1–4, 6–8
(Germany) Team Motopark	Mercedes-AMG GT3 Evo	65	(Germany) Timo Rumpfkeil	Am	1–4, 6–8
(Germany) Team Motopark	Mercedes-AMG GT3 Evo	95	(United Kingdom) Thomas Ikin	PA	All
(Germany) Team Motopark	Mercedes-AMG GT3 Evo	95	(Denmark) Morten Strømsted	PA	All
(Germany) Team Motopark	Mercedes-AMG GT3 Evo	96	(Austria) Lukas Dunner	P	All
(Germany) Team Motopark	Mercedes-AMG GT3 Evo	96	(United Kingdom) Charles Bateman	P	1–2
(Germany) Team Motopark	Mercedes-AMG GT3 Evo	96	(Spain) Lorenzo Fluxá	P	3–6
(Germany) Team Motopark	Mercedes-AMG GT3 Evo	96	(Germany) Julian Hanses	P	7
(Germany) Team Motopark	Mercedes-AMG GT3 Evo	96	(Poland) Jakub Giermaziak	P	8
(Germany) SPS Automotive Performance	Mercedes-AMG GT3 Evo	20	(Austria) Dominik Baumann	P	All
(Germany) SPS Automotive Performance	Mercedes-AMG GT3 Evo	20	(South Africa) Mikaeel Pitamber	P	All
(Germany) CBRX by SPS	Mercedes-AMG GT3 Evo	54	(Switzerland) Yannick Mettler	PA	All
(Germany) CBRX by SPS	Mercedes-AMG GT3 Evo	54	(Switzerland) Dexter Müller	PA	All
(Belgium) Comtoyou Racing	Aston Martin Vantage AMR GT3 Evo	21	(Belgium) Lorens Lecertua	P	3
(Belgium) Comtoyou Racing	Aston Martin Vantage AMR GT3 Evo	21	(Belgium) Matisse Lismont	P	3
(Italy) Pellin Racing	Ferrari 488 GT3 Evo 2020	23	(United States) Thor Haugen	PA	1, 5, 7
(Italy) Pellin Racing	Ferrari 488 GT3 Evo 2020	23	(Italy) Paolo Ruberti	PA	1, 5, 7
(United Kingdom) Greystone GT	McLaren 720S GT3 Evo	24	Andrey Borodin	PA	1, 3, 5–7
(United Kingdom) Greystone GT	McLaren 720S GT3 Evo	24	(United Kingdom) Oliver Webb	PA	1, 3, 5–7
(United Kingdom) Greystone GT	McLaren 720S GT3 Evo	33	(United Kingdom) James Kell	P	6–8
(United Kingdom) Greystone GT	McLaren 720S GT3 Evo	33	(United Kingdom) Dean MacDonald	P	6–8
(United Kingdom) Greystone GT	McLaren 720S GT3 Evo	66	(United Kingdom) Stewart Proctor	PA	All
(United Kingdom) Greystone GT	McLaren 720S GT3 Evo	66	(United Kingdom) Lewis Proctor	PA	1–3, 5–8
(United Kingdom) Greystone GT	McLaren 720S GT3 Evo	66	(United Kingdom) Steven Gray	PA	4
(France) Saintéloc Racing	Audi R8 LMS Evo II	26	(France) Michael Blanchemain	PA	8
(France) Saintéloc Racing	Audi R8 LMS Evo II	26	(France) Jim Pla	PA	8
(Germany) Leipert Motorsport	Lamborghini Huracán GT3 Evo 2	42	(Poland) Maciej Błażek	P 2 PA 5, 7	2, 5, 7
(Germany) Leipert Motorsport	Lamborghini Huracán GT3 Evo 2	42	(Germany) Mark Wallenwein	P 2 PA 5, 7	2, 5, 7
(Hungary) Zengő Motorsport	Mercedes-AMG GT3 Evo	43	(Hungary) Dániel Nagy	PA	4
(Italy) Scuderia Villorba Corse	Mercedes-AMG GT3 Evo	69	(France) Michael Blanchemain	PA	1–7
(Italy) Scuderia Villorba Corse	Mercedes-AMG GT3 Evo	69	(France) Jim Pla	PA	1, 3–5, 7
(Italy) Scuderia Villorba Corse	Mercedes-AMG GT3 Evo	69	Vladislav Lomko	PA	2, 6
(Italy) Scuderia Villorba Corse	Mercedes-AMG GT3 Evo	69	(Switzerland) Philip Ellis	PA	8
(Italy) Scuderia Villorba Corse	Mercedes-AMG GT3 Evo	69	(Italy) Denny Zardo	PA	8
(Czech Republic) ISR Racing	Audi R8 LMS Evo II	75	(Czech Republic) Libor Milota	PA	All
(Czech Republic) ISR Racing	Audi R8 LMS Evo II	75	(Czech Republic) Filip Salaquarda	PA	All
(Ukraine) Tsunami RT	Porsche 911 GT3 R (992)	79	(Italy) Fabio Babini	PA	6
(Ukraine) Tsunami RT	Porsche 911 GT3 R (992)	79	(Italy) Johannes Zelger	PA	6
(Germany) Lionspeed GP x Herberth	Porsche 911 GT3 R (992)	80	(Hong Kong) Antares Au	PA	3
(Germany) Lionspeed GP x Herberth	Porsche 911 GT3 R (992)	80	(Belgium) Alessio Picariello	PA	3
(United Kingdom) Optimum Motorsport	McLaren 720S GT3	84	(United Kingdom) Zac Meakin	P	8
(United Kingdom) Optimum Motorsport	McLaren 720S GT3	84	(United Kingdom) Michael Porter	P	8
(Germany) Tresor Attempto Racing	Audi R8 LMS Evo II	99	(Germany) Alex Aka	PA	4, 6
(Germany) Tresor Attempto Racing	Audi R8 LMS Evo II	99	(Germany) Florian Scholze	PA	4, 6
(New Zealand) Earl Bamber Motorsport	Porsche 911 GT3 R (992)	616	(Malaysia) Adrian D’Silva	PA	3
(New Zealand) Earl Bamber Motorsport	Porsche 911 GT3 R (992)	616	(New Zealand) Brendon Leitch	PA	3
(Australia) Triple Eight JMR	Mercedes-AMG GT3 Evo	888	(Malaysia) Prince Jefri Ibrahim	PA	3
(Australia) Triple Eight JMR	Mercedes-AMG GT3 Evo	888	(Australia) Jordan Love	PA	3

Icon	Class
P	Pro Cup
PA	Pro-Am Cup
Am	Am Cup

== Race results ==
Bold indicates overall winner. In the Pole Position column, bold indicates the driver who set the qualifying lap.

Round		Circuit	Pole position	Pro Winner	Pro-Am Winner	Am Winner
1	R1	(Portugal) Algarve International Circuit	(Poland) No. 777 Olimp Racing	**(Germany) No. 9 GetSpeed**	(Switzerland) No. 27 Spirit of Race	(Germany) No. 65 Team Motopark
1	R1	(Portugal) Algarve International Circuit	**(Poland) Karol Basz** (Poland) Marcin Jedliński	**(United States) Anthony Bartone** **(Germany) Fabian Schiller**	(Italy) Eddie Cheever III (Italy) Marco Pulcini	(Germany) Heiko Neumann (Germany) Timo Rumpfkeil
1	R2	(Portugal) Algarve International Circuit	(Germany) No. 20 SPS Automotive Performance	**(Oman) No. 77 Al Manar Racing by GetSpeed**	(Italy) No. 25 AF Corse	(Italy) No. 8 Il Barone Rampante
1	R2	(Portugal) Algarve International Circuit	**(Austria) Dominik Baumann** (South Africa) Mikaeel Pitamber	**(Oman) Al Faisal Al Zubair** **(Canada) Mikaël Grenier**	(Italy) Alessandro Cozzi (Italy) Giorgio Sernagiotto	(Italy) Giuseppe Cipriani
2	R1	(Germany) Hockenheimring	(Germany) No. 9 GetSpeed	**(Italy) No. 10 Oregon Team**	(Switzerland) No. 27 Spirit of Race	(Germany) No. 786 GetSpeed
2	R1	(Germany) Hockenheimring	(United States) Anthony Bartone **(Germany) Fabian Schiller**	**(Italy) Alessio Deledda** **(South Africa) Jordan Pepper**	(Italy) Eddie Cheever III (Italy) Marco Pulcini	(Thailand) Kiki Sak Nana (Germany) Adam Osieka
2	R2	(Germany) Hockenheimring	(Austria) No. 1 Eastalent Racing Team	**(Austria) No. 1 Eastalent Racing Team**	(Germany) No. 11 racing one	(Germany) No. 65 Team Motopark
2	R2	(Germany) Hockenheimring	**(Germany) Christopher Haase** (Austria) Simon Reicher	**(Germany) Christopher Haase** **(Austria) Simon Reicher**	(Austria) Ernst Kirchmayr (Germany) Luca Ludwig	(Germany) Heiko Neumann (Germany) Timo Rumpfkeil
3		(Belgium) Circuit de Spa-Francorchamps	(Germany) No. 17 Team Motopark	**(Oman) No. 77 Al Manar Racing by GetSpeed**	(Poland) No. 777 Olimp Racing	(Italy) No. 8 Il Barone Rampante
3		(Belgium) Circuit de Spa-Francorchamps	**(Mexico) Diego Menchaca** **(Argentina) Marcos Siebert**	**(Oman) Al Faisal Al Zubair** **(Canada) Mikaël Grenier**	(Poland) Karol Basz (Poland) Marcin Jedliński	(Italy) Giuseppe Cipriani (Kyrgyzstan) Dmitriy Gvazava
4	R1	(Hungary) Hungaroring	(Germany) No. 20 SPS Automotive Performance	**(Austria) No. 1 Eastalent Racing Team**	(Switzerland) No. 27 Spirit of Race	(Germany) No. 786 GetSpeed
4	R1	(Hungary) Hungaroring	**(Austria) Dominik Baumann** (South Africa) Mikaeel Pitamber	**(Germany) Christopher Haase** **(Austria) Simon Reicher**	(Italy) Eddie Cheever III (Italy) Marco Pulcini	(Thailand) Kiki Sak Nana (Germany) Adam Osieka
4	R2	(Hungary) Hungaroring	(Italy) No. 25 AF Corse	**(Italy) No. 63 Oregon Team**	(Switzerland) No. 27 Spirit of Race	(Germany) No. 786 GetSpeed
4	R2	(Hungary) Hungaroring	(Italy) Alessandro Cozzi **(Italy) Eliseo Donno**	**(Italy) Leonardo Pulcini** **(Germany) Simon Connor Primm**	(Italy) Eddie Cheever III (Italy) Marco Pulcini	(Thailand) Kiki Sak Nana (Germany) Adam Osieka
5	R1	(France) Circuit Paul Ricard	(Germany) No. 9 GetSpeed	**(Austria) No. 1 Eastalent Racing Team**	(Germany) No. 6 GetSpeed	(Italy) No. 47 AF Corse
5	R1	(France) Circuit Paul Ricard	(United States) Anthony Bartone **(Germany) Fabian Schiller**	**(Germany) Christopher Haase** **(Austria) Simon Reicher**	(Germany) Valentin Pierburg (United Kingdom) Aaron Walker	(Italy) Roberto Lacorte
5	R2	(France) Circuit Paul Ricard	(Switzerland) No. 27 Spirit of Race	**(Switzerland) No. 51 Spirit of Race**	(Italy) No. 16 AF Corse	(Italy) No. 47 AF Corse
5	R2	(France) Circuit Paul Ricard	**(Italy) Riccardo Agostini** (Italy) Marco Pulcini	**(Monaco) Vincent Abril** **(Italy) Nicola Marinangeli**	(Brazil) Marcelo Hahn (Brazil) Allam Khodair	(Italy) Roberto Lacorte
6	R1	(Austria) Red Bull Ring	(Italy) No. 10 Oregon Team	**(Italy) No. 10 Oregon Team**	(Germany) No. 11 racing one	(Italy) No. 61 AF Corse
6	R1	(Austria) Red Bull Ring	**(Italy)** Alessio Deledda **(South Africa) Jordan Pepper**	**(Italy) Alessio Deledda** **(South Africa) Jordan Pepper**	(Italy) Giacomo Altoè (Austria) Ernst Kirchmayr	(United States) Ziad Ghandour
6	R2	(Austria) Red Bull Ring	(Germany) No. 11 racing one	**(Austria) No. 1 Eastalent Racing Team**	(Switzerland) No. 27 Spirit of Race	(Italy) No. 8 Il Barone Rampante
6	R2	(Austria) Red Bull Ring	(Austria) Ernst Kirchmayr **(Italy) Giacomo Altoè**	**(Germany) Christopher Haase** **(Austria) Simon Reicher**	(Italy) Eddie Cheever III (Italy) Marco Pulcini	(Italy) Giuseppe Cipriani
7	R1	(Spain) Circuit de Barcelona-Catalunya	(Germany) No. 15 Car Collection Motorsport	**(Germany) No. 15 Car Collection Motorsport**	(Germany) No. 6 GetSpeed	(Germany) No. 65 Team Motopark
7	R1	(Spain) Circuit de Barcelona-Catalunya	(Sweden) Gustav Bergström **(Germany) Nico Menzel**	**(Sweden) Gustav Bergström** **(Germany) Nico Menzel**	(Germany) Valentin Pierburg **(United Kingdom)** Aaron Walker	(Germany) Heiko Neumann (Germany) Timo Rumpfkeil
7	R2	(Spain) Circuit de Barcelona-Catalunya	(Switzerland) No. 51 Spirit of Race	**(Switzerland) No. 51 Spirit of Race**	(Germany) No. 12 Car Collection Motorsport	(Germany) No. 786 GetSpeed
7	R2	(Spain) Circuit de Barcelona-Catalunya	(Monaco) **Vincent Abril** (Italy) Nicola Marinangeli	**(Monaco) Vincent Abril** **(Italy) Nicola Marinangeli**	(United States) "Hash" (Switzerland) Alex Fontana	(Thailand) Kiki Sak Nana (Germany) Adam Osieka
8		(Italy) Autodromo Nazionale di Monza	(Germany) No. 96 Team Motopark	**(United Kingdom) No. 33 Greystone GT**	(Italy) No. 16 AF Corse	(Germany) No. 65 Team Motopark
8		(Italy) Autodromo Nazionale di Monza	(Austria) Lukas Dunner (Poland) Jakub Giermaziak	**(United Kingdom) James Kell** **(United Kingdom) Dean MacDonald**	(Brazil) Marcelo Hahn (Brazil) Allam Khodair	(Germany) Heiko Neumann (Germany) Timo Rumpfkeil

== Championship standings ==
=== Points systems ===
Points are awarded to the top 10 (Pro) or top 6 (Am, Pro-Am, Teams) classified finishers. If less than 6 participants start the race or if less than 75% of the original race distance is completed, half points are awarded. For the Endurance Race (Spa, Monza) points are multiplied by 2. At the end of the season, the 2 lowest race scores are dropped; if the points dropped are those obtained in endurance races, that will count as 2 races; however, the dropped races cannot be the result of disqualification or race bans.

==== Overall ====
Position	1st	2nd	3rd	4th	5th	6th	7th	8th	9th	10th
Points	15	12	10	8	6	5	4	3	2	1

==== Pro-Am, Am, and Teams ====
Position	1st	2nd	3rd	4th	5th	6th
Points	10	8	6	4	3	2

=== Drivers' championship ===
==== Overall ====
Pos.	Driver	Team	(Portugal) ALG		(Germany) HOC		(Belgium) SPA	(Hungary) HUN		(France) LEC		(Austria) RBR		(Spain) CAT		(Italy) MNZ	Pts	Net Points
1	(Germany) Christopher Haase (Austria) Simon Reicher	(Austria) Eastalent Racing Team	10	4	Ret	1	8	1	28†	1	2	9	1	10	3	2	124	124
2	(Italy) Alessio Deledda	(Italy) Oregon Team	11	21	1	5	2	7	7	5	3	1	9	5	4	7	108	108
3	(Monaco) Vincent Abril (Italy) Nicola Marinangeli	(Switzerland) Spirit of Race	6	Ret	3	Ret	14	2	5	4	1	11	2	6	1	4	104	104
4	(South Africa) Jordan Pepper	(Italy) Oregon Team	11	21	1	5	2			5	3	1	9	5	4	7	100	100
5	(United States) Anthony Bartone (Germany) Fabian Schiller	(Germany) GetSpeed	1	7	10	Ret	5	27†	4	2	4	4	DNS	2	9	8	88	88
6	(Sweden) Gustav Bergström (Germany) Nico Menzel	(Germany) Car Collection Motorsport	7	5	9	3	Ret	8	2	12	8	2	7	1	8	5	86	86
7	(Austria) Dominik Baumann (South Africa) Mikaeel Pitamber	(Germany) SPS Automotive Performance	8	2	6	4	4	5	3	6	9	Ret	10	3	5	13	84	84
8	(Mexico) Diego Menchaca (Argentina) Marcos Siebert	(Germany) Team Motopark	Ret	3	2	2	6	3	11	3	Ret	7	Ret	7	6	9	81	81
9	(Austria) Lukas Dunner	(Germany) Team Motopark	5	10	7	14	Ret	11	6	7	5	5	5	4	2	3	78	78
10	(Italy) Leonardo Pulcini	(Italy) Oregon Team	9	6	5	7	WD	4	1	9	6	3	4	8	Ret	24	68	68
11	(Oman) Al Faisal Al Zubair (Canada) Mikaël Grenier	(Oman) Al Manar Racing by GetSpeed	4	1			1										53	53
12	(United Kingdom) James Kell (United Kingdom) Dean MacDonald	(United Kingdom) Greystone GT										6	3	29†	Ret	1	45	45
13	(Switzerland) Rolf Ineichen	(Italy) Oregon Team	9	6	5	7	WD					3	4			24	35	35
14	(Italy) Marco Pulcini	(Switzerland) Spirit of Race	2	11	4	12	13	6	8	14	10	14	8	11	Ret		32	32
15	(Italy) Eddie Cheever III	(Switzerland) Spirit of Race	2	11	4	12	13	6	8			14	8	11	Ret		31	31
16	(Spain) Lorenzo Fluxá	(Germany) Team Motopark					Ret	11	6	7	5	5	5				27	27
17	(Poland) Karol Basz (Poland) Marcin Jedliński	(Poland) Olimp Racing	3	24	8	22	7	16	10	16	13	12	23	14	10	10	25	25
18	(Germany) Simon Connor Primm	(Italy) Oregon Team						4	1								23	23
19	(Brazil) Marcelo Hahn (Brazil) Allam Khodair	(Brazil) Blau Motorsport	26	26	16	8	26	10	9	10	7	16	22	17	11	6	21	21
20	(Germany) Julian Hanses	(Germany) Team Motopark												4	2		20	20
21	(Belgium) Matisse Lismont (Belgium) Lorens Lecertua	(Belgium) Comtoyou Racing					3										20	20
22	(Italy) Marzio Moretti (Israel) Artem Petrov	(Italy) Oregon Team	Ret	8	12	13	9	Ret	17	11	15	8	6	12	27	11	15	15
23	(United Kingdom) Charles Bateman	(Germany) Team Motopark	5	10	7	14											11	11
24	(Austria) Ernst Kirchmayr	(Germany) racing one	17	23	27	6	22	9	13	15	14	10	16				8	8
25	(Germany) Maximilian Paul	(Italy) Oregon Team						7	7								8	8
26	(Germany) Valentin Pierburg (United Kingdom) Aaron Walker	(Germany) GetSpeed	32	32	20	10	10	15	15	8	12	13	18	9	17	15	8	8
27	(Belgium) Amaury Bonduel	(Italy) Oregon Team								9	6						7	7
28	(Germany) Luca Ludwig	(Germany) racing one	17	23	27	6	22										5	5
29	(United States) "Hash" (Switzerland) Alex Fontana	(Germany) Car Collection Motorsport	27	18	28	17	16	23	19	18	20	18	17	Ret	7	Ret	4	4
30	(Italy) Alberto Di Folco	(Italy) Oregon Team												8	Ret		3	3
31	(United Kingdom) Thomas Ikin (Denmark) Morten Strømsted	(Germany) Team Motopark	12	15	11	9	11	12	Ret	23	28	17	11	19	16	21	2	2
32	(Italy) Alessandro Cozzi	(Italy) AF Corse	15	9	13	11	19	13	12	Ret	27	Ret	13	21	30†		2	2
33	(Italy) Giorgio Sernagiotto	(Italy) AF Corse	15	9	13	11	19			Ret	27	Ret	13	21	30†		2	2
34	(Italy) David Fumanelli	(Germany) racing one						9	13	15	14						2	2
35	(Italy) Riccardo Agostini	(Switzerland) Spirit of Race								14	10						1	1
36	(Italy) Giacomo Altoè	(Germany) racing one										10	16				1	1
37	(Switzerland) Yannick Mettler (Switzerland) Dexter Müller	(Germany) CBRX by SPS	13	13	24	16	20	17	16	17	11	19	12	16	12	14	0	0
38	(France) Michael Blanchemain	(Italy) Scuderia Villorba Corse	19	12	17	15	18	21	14	Ret	24	28	28	25	22		0	0
38	(France) Michael Blanchemain	(France) Saintéloc Racing														12	0	0
39	(France) Jim Pla	(Italy) Scuderia Villorba Corse	19	12			18	21	14	Ret	24			25	22		0	0
39	(France) Jim Pla	(France) Saintéloc Racing														12	0	0
40	(Italy) Eliseo Donno	(Italy) AF Corse						13	12								0	0
41	(Malaysia) Prince Jefri Ibrahim (Australia) Jordan Love	(Australia) Triple Eight JMR					12										0	0
42	(United Kingdom) Stewart Proctor	(United Kingdom) Greystone GT	16	17	19	Ret	15	28†	26	13	16	23	20	Ret	13	17	0	0
43	(United Kingdom) Lewis Proctor	(United Kingdom) Greystone GT	16	17	19	Ret	15			13	16	23	20	Ret	13	17	0	0
44	(Czech Republic) Libor Milota (Czech Republic) Filip Salaquarda	(Czech Republic) ISR Racing	20	22	Ret	28	Ret	Ret	18	22	Ret	Ret	DNS	13	15	18	0	0
45	(Germany) Florian Scholze (Germany) Alex Aka	(Germany) Tresor Attempto Racing						25	21			20	14	20	14		0	0
46	(Kuwait) Bashar Mardini	(Germany) Car Collection Motorsport	22	14	15	18	25	19	23	19	17	27	15	18	Ret	Ret	0	0
47	(Netherlands) Tijmen van der Helm	(Germany) Car Collection Motorsport	22	14			25			19	17	27	15	18	Ret	Ret	0	0
48	(Belgium) Laurent de Meeus (United Kingdom) Jamie Stanley	(Italy) AF Corse	23	30	14	21	24			25	30†	Ret	21	15	24	25	0	0
49	(Switzerland) Gino Forgione (Italy) Michele Rugolo	(Switzerland) Spirit of Race	21	16	18	19	23	14	20			Ret	24	22	20	16	0	0
50	(United States) Conrad Grunewald (United States) Jean-Claude Saada	(Italy) AF Corse	14	19	Ret	26	17										0	0
51	Vladislav Lomko	(Italy) Scuderia Villorba Corse			17	15						28	28				0	0
52	(Italy) Fabio Babini (Italy) Johannes Zeigler	(San Marino) Tsunami RT										15	19				0	0
53	(Poland) Maciej Błażek (Germany) Mark Wallenwein	(Germany) Leipert Motorsport			21	23				21	18			26	19		0	0
54	(Germany) Heiko Neumann (Germany) Timo Rumpfkeil	(Germany) Team Motopark	18	31	25	20	28	24	Ret			26	27	23	29	20	0	0
55	(Netherlands) "Daan Arrow" (Poland) Piotr Wira	(Poland) Good Speed Racing Team								20	25	22	25	Ret	18		0	0
56	(Thailand) Kiki Sak Nana (Germany) Adam Osieka	(Germany) GetSpeed	25	28	22	25	Ret	18	24	Ret	21	29	29	24	21	Ret	0	0
57	(Italy) Giuseppe Cipriani	(Italy) Il Barone Rampante	24	20	23	24	27	22	25	26	26	25	26	28	25	19	0	0
58	(Sweden) Emil Persson	(Germany) Car Collection Motorsport						19	23								0	0
59	(Italy) Roberto Lacorte	(Italy) Cetilar Racing								24	19						0	0
60	(Hungary) Dániel Nagy	(Hungary) Zengő Motorsport						20	22								0	0
61	Andrey Borodin (United Kingdom) Oliver Webb	(United Kingdom) Greystone GT	28	27			21			30	29	21	31†	27	23		0	0
62	(Poland) Krystian Korzeniowski (Poland) Stanisław Jedliński	(Poland) Olimp Racing	31	25	26	22	29	26	27	28	23	30	30	32	28	26	0	0
63	(United Kingdom) Tom Jackson (Zimbabwe) Ameerh Naran	(Germany) Vimana by GetSpeed	30	33						29	22			30	26	23	0	0
64	(United States) Ziad Ghandour	(Italy) AF Corse										24	Ret				0	0
65	(United Kingdom) Steven Gray	(United Kingdom) Greystone GT						28†	26								0	0
66	(United States) Thor Haugen (Italy) Paolo Ruberti	(Italy) Pellin Racing	29	29						27	Ret			31	DNS		0	0
67	(Kyrgyzstan) Dmitriy Gvazava	(Italy) Il Barone Rampante					27										0	0
68	(Belgium) Alessio Picariello (Hong Kong) Antares Au	(Germany) Lionspeed GP x Herberth					30										0	0
69	(New Zealand) Brendon Leitch (Malaysia) Adrian D’Silva	(New Zealand) Earl Bamber Motorsport					Ret										0	0
Ineligible for championship
–	(Poland) Jakub Giermaziak	(Germany) Team Motopark														3	–	–
–	(Brazil) Rubens Barrichello	(Italy) Il Barone Rampante														19	–	–
–	(Switzerland) Philip Ellis (Italy) Denny Zardo	(Italy) Scuderia Villorba Corse														22	–	–
–	(United Kingdom) Zac Meakin (United Kingdom) Michael Porter	(United Kingdom) Optimum Motorsport														27	–	–

==== Pro-Am ====
Pos.	Driver	Team	(Portugal) ALG		(Germany) HOC		(Belgium) SPA	(Hungary) HUN		(France) LEC		(Austria) RBR		(Spain) CAT	(Italy) MNZ	Pts	Net Points
1	(Italy) Marco Pulcini	(Switzerland) Spirit of Race	2	11	4	12	13	6	8	14	10	14	8			82	82
2	(Italy) Eddie Cheever III	(Switzerland) Spirit of Race	2	11	4	12	13	6	8			14	8			70	70
3	(Poland) Karol Basz (Poland) Marcin Jedliński	(Poland) Olimp Racing	3	24	8	22	7	16	10	16	13	12	23			55	55
4	(United Kingdom) Thomas Ikin (Denmark) Morten Strømsted	(Germany) Team Motopark	12	15	11	9	11	12	Ret	23	28	17	11			44	44
5	(Brazil) Marcelo Hahn (Brazil) Allam Khodair	(Brazil) Blau Motorsport	26	26	16	8	26	10	9	10	7	16	22			42	42
6	(Germany) Valentin Pierburg (United Kingdom) Aaron Walker	(Germany) GetSpeed	32	32	20	10	10	15	15	8	12	13	18			40	40
7	(Austria) Ernst Kirchmayr	(Germany) racing one	17	23	27	6	22	9	13	15	14	10	16			36	36
8	(Italy) Alessandro Cozzi	(Italy) AF Corse	15	9	13	11	19	13	12	Ret	27	Ret	13			30	30
9	(Italy) Giorgio Sernagiotto	(Italy) AF Corse	15	9	13	11	19			Ret	27	Ret	13			23	23
10	(Switzerland) Yannick Mettler (Switzerland) Dexter Müller	(Germany) CBRX by SPS	13	13	24	16	20	17	16	17	11	19	12			20	20
11	(Italy) David Fumanelli	(Germany) racing one						9	13	15	14					16	16
12	(Italy) Riccardo Agostini	(Switzerland) Spirit of Race								14	10					12	12
13	(Austria) Giacomo Altoè	(Germany) racing one										10	16			10	10
14	(Germany) Luca Ludwig	(Germany) racing one	17	23	27	6	22									10	10
15	(United Kingdom) Stewart Proctor	(United Kingdom) Greystone GT	16	17	19	Ret	15	28†	26	13	16	23	20			10	10
16	(United Kingdom) Lewis Proctor	(United Kingdom) Greystone GT	16	17	19	Ret	15			13	16	23	20			10	10
17	(France) Michael Blanchemain	(Italy) Scuderia Villorba Corse	19	12	17	15	18	21	14	Ret	24	28	28			8	8
18	(France) Jim Pla	(Italy) Scuderia Villorba Corse	19	12			18	21	14	Ret	24					8	8
19	(Malaysia) Prince Jefri Ibrahim (Australia) Jordan Love	(Australia) Triple Eight JMR					12									8	8
20	(Italy) Eliseo Donno	(Italy) AF Corse						13	12							7	7
21	(Kuwait) Bashar Mardini	(Germany) Car Collection Motorsport	22	14	15	18	25	19	23	19	17	27	15			7	7
22	(Netherlands) Tijmen van der Helm	(Germany) Car Collection Motorsport	22	14			25			19	17	27	15			5	5
23	(United States) Conrad Grunewald (United States) Jean-Claude Saada	(Italy) AF Corse	14	19	Ret	26	17									3	3
24	(Germany) Florian Scholze (Germany) Alex Aka	(Germany) Tresor Attempto Racing						25	21			20	14			3	3
25	(Italy) Fabio Babini (Italy) Johannes Zeigler	(San Marino) Tsunami RT										15	19			3	3
26	(Belgium) Laurent de Meeus (United Kingdom) Jamie Stanley	(Italy) AF Corse	23	30	14	21	24			25	30†	Ret	21			3	3
27	(Switzerland) Gino Forgione (Italy) Michele Rugolo	(Switzerland) Spirit of Race	21	16	18	19	23	14	20			Ret	24			2	2
28	(United States) "Hash" (Switzerland) Alex Fontana	(Germany) Car Collection Motorsport	27	18	28	17	16	23	19	18	20	18	17			0	0
29	Vladislav Lomko	(Italy) Scuderia Villorba Corse			17	15						28	28			0	0
30	(Czech Republic) Libor Milota (Czech Republic) Filip Salaquarda	(Czech Republic) ISR Racing	20	22	Ret	28	Ret	Ret	18	22	Ret	Ret	DNS			0	0
31	(Poland) Maciej Błażek (Germany) Mark Wallenwein	(Germany) Leipert Motorsport								21	18					0	0
32	(Netherlands) "Daan Arrow" (Poland) Piotr Wira	(Poland) Good Speed Racing Team								20	25	22	25			0	0
33	(Sweden) Emil Persson	(Germany) Car Collection Motorsport						19	23							0	0
34	Andrey Borodin (United Kingdom) Oliver Webb	(United Kingdom) Greystone GT	28	27			21			30	29	21	31†			0	0
35	(Hungary) Dániel Nagy	(Hungary) Zengő Motorsport						20	22							0	0
36	(United Kingdom) Tom Jackson (Zimbabwe) Ameerh Naran	(Germany) Vimana by GetSpeed	30	33						29	22					0	0
37	(United Kingdom) Steven Gray	(United Kingdom) Greystone GT						28†	26							0	0
38	(United States) Thor Haugen (Italy) Paolo Ruberti	(Italy) Pellin Racing	29	29						27	Ret					0	0
39	(Belgium) Alessio Picariello (Hong Kong) Antares Au	(Germany) Lionspeed GP x Herberth					30									0	0
40	(New Zealand) Brendon Leitch (Malaysia) Adrian D’Silva	(New Zealand) Earl Bamber Motorsport					Ret									0	0

==== Am ====
Pos.	Driver	Team	(Portugal) ALG		(Germany) HOC		(Belgium) SPA	(Hungary) HUN		(France) LEC		(Austria) RBR		(Spain) CAT		(Italy) MNZ	Pts	Net Points
1	(Italy) Giuseppe Cipriani	(Italy) Il Barone Rampante	24	20	23	24	27	22	25	26	26	25	26	28	24		114	114
2	(Germany) Heiko Neumann (Germany) Timo Rumpfkeil	(Germany) Team Motopark	18	31	25	20	28	24	Ret			26	27	24	29	20	90	90
3	(Thailand) Kiki Sak Nana (Germany) Adam Osieka	(Germany) GetSpeed	25	28	22	25	Ret	18	24	Ret	21	29	29	25	21	Ret	84	84
4	(Poland) Krystian Korzeniowski (Poland) Stanisław Jedliński	(Poland) Olimp Racing	31	25	26	22	29	26	27	28	23	30	30	32	28	26	79	79
5	(Italy) Roberto Lacorte	(Italy) Cetilar Racing								24	19						20	20
6	(Kyrgyzstan) Dmitriy Gvazava	(Italy) Il Barone Rampante					27										20	20
7	(United States) Ziad Ghandour	(Italy) AF Corse										24	Ret				10	10
