= 2023 GT World Challenge America =

Motor racing competition

The 2023 Fanatec GT World Challenge America Powered by AWS was the seventeenth season of the United States Auto Club's GT World Challenge America, and the sixth under ownership of SRO Motorsports Group.

The season began at Sonoma on March 30, and ended at Indianapolis on October 8.

Eric Filgueiras and Stevan McAleer won the Pro class championship for Rennsport One (RS1) in the new Porsche 911 GT3 R, one year after they won the 2022 GT4 America Series Silver class title. George Kurtz and Colin Braun won the Pro-Am championship for CrowdStrike by Riley.

== Calendar ==
The preliminary calendar was released on July 29, 2022, featuring 14 races across seven rounds. In September, an updated schedule was released, postponing the event at Circuit of the Americas by two weeks and bringing the Road America round forward one week. An additional change was announced on October 17, moving the NOLA round from February 24–26 to April 28–30 to alleviate a clash with the Kyalami 9 Hours, as well as allowing the 2023 BoP test to be completed before the start of the season.

Round	Circuit	Date	Map
1	Sonoma Raceway, Sonoma, California	March 30 – April 2	2023 GT World Challenge America is located in the United States
2	NOLA Motorsports Park, Avondale, Louisiana	April 28–30	2023 GT World Challenge America is located in the United States
3	Circuit of the Americas, Austin, Texas	May 19–21	2023 GT World Challenge America is located in the United States
4	Virginia International Raceway, Alton, Virginia	June 16–18	2023 GT World Challenge America is located in the United States
5	Road America, Elkhart Lake, Wisconsin	August 18–20	2023 GT World Challenge America is located in the United States
6	Sebring International Raceway, Sebring, Florida	September 22–24	2023 GT World Challenge America is located in the United States
7	Indianapolis Motor Speedway, Indianapolis, Indiana	October 6–8	2023 GT World Challenge America is located in the United States

== Entry list ==
Team	Car	Engine	No.	Drivers	Class	Rounds
(United States) TRG-AMR	Aston Martin Vantage AMR GT3	Aston Martin M177 4.0 L Turbo V8	007	(United States) Derek DeBoer	PA	All
(United States) TRG-AMR	Aston Martin Vantage AMR GT3	Aston Martin M177 4.0 L Turbo V8	007	(United Kingdom) Ross Gunn	PA	1, 6
(United States) TRG-AMR	Aston Martin Vantage AMR GT3	Aston Martin M177 4.0 L Turbo V8	007	(France) Valentin Hasse-Clot	PA	2–5, 7
(United States) TRG-AMR	Aston Martin Vantage AMR GT3	Aston Martin M177 4.0 L Turbo V8	007	(United Kingdom) Ben Tuck	PA	7
(United States) CrowdStrike Racing by Riley Motorsports	Mercedes-AMG GT3 Evo	Mercedes-AMG M159 6.2 L V8	04	(United States) Colin Braun	PA	All
(United States) CrowdStrike Racing by Riley Motorsports	Mercedes-AMG GT3 Evo	Mercedes-AMG M159 6.2 L V8	04	(United States) George Kurtz	PA	All
(United States) CrowdStrike Racing by Riley Motorsports	Mercedes-AMG GT3 Evo	Mercedes-AMG M159 6.2 L V8	04	(United States) Nolan Siegel	PA	7
(United States) DXDT Racing	Mercedes-AMG GT3 Evo	Mercedes-AMG M159 6.2 L V8	08	(United States) Bryan Sellers	PA	All
(United States) DXDT Racing	Mercedes-AMG GT3 Evo	Mercedes-AMG M159 6.2 L V8	08	(United States) Scott Smithson	PA	All
(United States) DXDT Racing	Mercedes-AMG GT3 Evo	Mercedes-AMG M159 6.2 L V8	08	(Australia) Tom Sargent	PA	7
(United States) DXDT Racing	Mercedes-AMG GT3 Evo	Mercedes-AMG M159 6.2 L V8	91	(United States) Jeff Burton	PA	All
(United States) DXDT Racing	Mercedes-AMG GT3 Evo	Mercedes-AMG M159 6.2 L V8	91	(United States) Corey Lewis	PA	All
(United States) DXDT Racing	Mercedes-AMG GT3 Evo	Mercedes-AMG M159 6.2 L V8	91	(Switzerland) Philip Ellis	PA	7
(United States) Turner Motorsports	BMW M4 GT3	BMW S58B30T0 3.0 L Twin Turbo I6	096	(United States) Vincent Barletta	PA	4
(United States) Turner Motorsports	BMW M4 GT3	BMW S58B30T0 3.0 L Twin Turbo I6	096	(United States) Robby Foley	PA	4
(Australia) Grove Racing	Porsche 911 GT3 R (992)	Porsche M97/80 4.2 L Flat-6	4	(New Zealand) Earl Bamber	PA	7
(Australia) Grove Racing	Porsche 911 GT3 R (992)	Porsche M97/80 4.2 L Flat-6	4	(Australia) Brenton Grove	PA	7
(Australia) Grove Racing	Porsche 911 GT3 R (992)	Porsche M97/80 4.2 L Flat-6	4	(Australia) Stephen Grove	PA	7
(United States) TR3 Racing	Mercedes-AMG GT3 Evo	Mercedes-AMG M159 6.2 L V8	9	(United States) Ziad Ghandour	PA	1–3, 5
(United States) TR3 Racing	Mercedes-AMG GT3 Evo	Mercedes-AMG M159 6.2 L V8	9	(Canada) Daniel Morad	PA	1–3, 5
(United States) TR3 Racing	Mercedes-AMG GT3 Evo	Mercedes-AMG M159 6.2 L V8	9	(United States) Kenton Koch	P	4
(United States) TR3 Racing	Mercedes-AMG GT3 Evo	Mercedes-AMG M159 6.2 L V8	9	(Canada) Daniel Morad	P	4
(United States) TR3 Racing	Mercedes-AMG GT3 Evo	Mercedes-AMG M159 6.2 L V8	27	(United Kingdom) Matt Bell	PA	7
(United States) TR3 Racing	Mercedes-AMG GT3 Evo	Mercedes-AMG M159 6.2 L V8	27	(United States) Jon Branam	PA	7
(United States) TR3 Racing	Mercedes-AMG GT3 Evo	Mercedes-AMG M159 6.2 L V8	27	(United States) Kenton Koch	PA	7
(United States) TR3 Racing	Mercedes-AMG GT3 Evo	Mercedes-AMG M159 6.2 L V8	77	(United States) Jon Branam	Am	5
(United States) TR3 Racing	Mercedes-AMG GT3 Evo	Mercedes-AMG M159 6.2 L V8	77	(United States) Paul Kiebler	Am	5
(United States) GMG Racing	Audi R8 LMS Evo II	Audi DAR 5.2 L V10	14	(United States) Tom Dyer	PA	1
(United States) GMG Racing	Audi R8 LMS Evo II	Audi DAR 5.2 L V10	14	(United States) James Sofronas	PA	1
(United States) GMG Racing	Porsche 911 GT3 R (992)	Porsche M97/80 4.2 L Flat-6	32	(Netherlands) Jeroen Bleekemolen	PA	5
(United States) GMG Racing	Porsche 911 GT3 R (992)	Porsche M97/80 4.2 L Flat-6	32	(United States) Kyle Washington	PA	5
(United States) ACI Motorsports	Porsche 911 GT3 R	Porsche 4.0 L Flat-6	16	(United States) Spencer Pumpelly	PA	1–4
(United States) ACI Motorsports	Porsche 911 GT3 R	Porsche 4.0 L Flat-6	16	(Switzerland) Pedro Torres	PA	1–4
(United States) Mercedes-AMG Austin with Esses Racing	Mercedes-AMG GT3 Evo	Mercedes-AMG M159 6.2 L V8	19	(United Kingdom) Adam Carroll	PA	1–3, 5
(United States) Mercedes-AMG Austin with Esses Racing	Mercedes-AMG GT3 Evo	Mercedes-AMG M159 6.2 L V8	19	(United States) Will Hardeman	PA	1–3, 5
(Germany) Huber Motorsport	Porsche 911 GT3 R (992)	Porsche M97/80 4.2 L Flat-6	20	(Hong Kong) Antares Au	PA	7
(Germany) Huber Motorsport	Porsche 911 GT3 R (992)	Porsche M97/80 4.2 L Flat-6	20	(Germany) Laurin Heinrich	PA	7
(Germany) Huber Motorsport	Porsche 911 GT3 R (992)	Porsche M97/80 4.2 L Flat-6	20	(Germany) Alfred Renauer	PA	7
(United States) Conquest Racing	Ferrari 296 GT3	Ferrari F163 3.0 L Turbo V6	21	(Italy) Alessandro Balzan	P	All
(United States) Conquest Racing	Ferrari 296 GT3	Ferrari F163 3.0 L Turbo V6	21	(United States) Manny Franco	P	All
(United States) Conquest Racing	Ferrari 296 GT3	Ferrari F163 3.0 L Turbo V6	21	(France) Lilou Wadoux	P	7
(United States) RennSport1 - CBW Racing	Porsche 911 GT3 R (992)	Porsche M97/80 4.2 L Flat-6	28	(United States) Eric Filgueiras	P	All
(United States) RennSport1 - CBW Racing	Porsche 911 GT3 R (992)	Porsche M97/80 4.2 L Flat-6	28	(United Kingdom) Stevan McAleer	P	All
(United States) RennSport1 - CBW Racing	Porsche 911 GT3 R (992)	Porsche M97/80 4.2 L Flat-6	28	(Austria) Klaus Bachler	P	7
(Belgium) Team WRT	BMW M4 GT3	BMW S58B30T0 3.0 L Twin Turbo I6	30	(Austria) Philipp Eng	P	7
(Belgium) Team WRT	BMW M4 GT3	BMW S58B30T0 3.0 L Twin Turbo I6	30	(South Africa) Sheldon van der Linde	P	7
(Belgium) Team WRT	BMW M4 GT3	BMW S58B30T0 3.0 L Twin Turbo I6	30	(Belgium) Dries Vanthoor	P	7
(Belgium) Team WRT	BMW M4 GT3	BMW S58B30T0 3.0 L Twin Turbo I6	31	(Brazil) Augusto Farfus	P	7
(Belgium) Team WRT	BMW M4 GT3	BMW S58B30T0 3.0 L Twin Turbo I6	31	(Belgium) Maxime Martin	P	7
(Belgium) Team WRT	BMW M4 GT3	BMW S58B30T0 3.0 L Twin Turbo I6	31	(Belgium) Charles Weerts	P	7
(United States) Triarsi Competizione	Ferrari 296 GT3	Ferrari F163 3.0 L Turbo V6	33	(United Kingdom) Ryan Dalziel	PA	1–4, 6–7
(United States) Triarsi Competizione	Ferrari 296 GT3	Ferrari F163 3.0 L Turbo V6	33	(United States) Justin Wetherill	PA	1–4, 6–7
(United States) Triarsi Competizione	Ferrari 296 GT3	Ferrari F163 3.0 L Turbo V6	33	(United States) Onofrio Triarsi	PA	7
(Canada) ST Racing	BMW M4 GT3	BMW S58B30T0 3.0 L Twin Turbo I6	38	(Canada) Samantha Tan	PA	All
(Canada) ST Racing	BMW M4 GT3	BMW S58B30T0 3.0 L Twin Turbo I6	38	(United States) John Edwards	PA	1–3
(Canada) ST Racing	BMW M4 GT3	BMW S58B30T0 3.0 L Twin Turbo I6	38	(United States) Neil Verhagen	PA	4–7
(Canada) ST Racing	BMW M4 GT3	BMW S58B30T0 3.0 L Twin Turbo I6	38	(United States) Jake Walker	PA	7
(United States) Bartone Bros Racing with RealTime	Mercedes-AMG GT3 Evo	Mercedes-AMG M159 6.2 L V8	43	(United States) Anthony Bartone	Am	1–3
(United States) Bartone Bros Racing with RealTime	Mercedes-AMG GT3 Evo	Mercedes-AMG M159 6.2 L V8	43	(United Kingdom) Andy Pilgrim	Am	1–3
(United States) Bartone Bros Racing with RealTime	Mercedes-AMG GT3 Evo	Mercedes-AMG M159 6.2 L V8	43	(United States) Anthony Bartone	PA	4–6
(United States) Bartone Bros Racing with RealTime	Mercedes-AMG GT3 Evo	Mercedes-AMG M159 6.2 L V8	43	(United Kingdom) Adam Christodoulou	PA	4–6
(United States) Wright Motorsports	Porsche 911 GT3 R (992)	Porsche M97/80 4.2 L Flat-6	45	(Belgium) Jan Heylen	PA	1–4
(United States) Wright Motorsports	Porsche 911 GT3 R (992)	Porsche M97/80 4.2 L Flat-6	45	(United States) Charlie Luck	PA	1–4
(United States) Wright Motorsports	Porsche 911 GT3 R (992)	Porsche M97/80 4.2 L Flat-6	45	(Belgium) Jan Heylen	P	5–7
(United States) Wright Motorsports	Porsche 911 GT3 R (992)	Porsche M97/80 4.2 L Flat-6	45	(United States) Madison Snow	P	5–7
(United States) Wright Motorsports	Porsche 911 GT3 R (992)	Porsche M97/80 4.2 L Flat-6	45	(United States) Trent Hindman	P	7
(United States) Wright Motorsports	Porsche 911 GT3 R 1–6; Porsche 911 GT3 R (992) 7	Porsche 4.0 L Flat-6 1–6; Porsche M97/80 4.2 L Flat-6 7	120	(United States) Adam Adelson	PA	All
(United States) Wright Motorsports	Porsche 911 GT3 R 1–6; Porsche 911 GT3 R (992) 7	Porsche 4.0 L Flat-6 1–6; Porsche M97/80 4.2 L Flat-6 7	120	(United States) Elliott Skeer	PA	All
(United States) Wright Motorsports	Porsche 911 GT3 R 1–6; Porsche 911 GT3 R (992) 7	Porsche 4.0 L Flat-6 1–6; Porsche M97/80 4.2 L Flat-6 7	120	(United Kingdom) Callum Ilott	PA	7
(United States) MDK Motorsports	Porsche 911 GT3 R (992)	Porsche M97/80 4.2 L Flat-6	53	(United States) Trenton Estep	P	All
(United States) MDK Motorsports	Porsche 911 GT3 R (992)	Porsche M97/80 4.2 L Flat-6	53	(United States) Seth Lucas	P	All
(United States) MDK Motorsports	Porsche 911 GT3 R (992)	Porsche M97/80 4.2 L Flat-6	53	(Italy) Matteo Cairoli	P	7
(Hong Kong) Craft-Bamboo Racing	Mercedes-AMG GT3 Evo	Mercedes-AMG M159 6.2 L V8	77	(Germany) Maximilian Götz	P	7
(Hong Kong) Craft-Bamboo Racing	Mercedes-AMG GT3 Evo	Mercedes-AMG M159 6.2 L V8	77	(Andorra) Jules Gounon	P	7
(Hong Kong) Craft-Bamboo Racing	Mercedes-AMG GT3 Evo	Mercedes-AMG M159 6.2 L V8	77	(Switzerland) Raffaele Marciello	P	7
(United States) Rearden Racing	Porsche 911 GT3 R (992)	Porsche M97/80 4.2 L Flat-6	85	(Germany) Christian Engelhart	P	7
(United States) Rearden Racing	Porsche 911 GT3 R (992)	Porsche M97/80 4.2 L Flat-6	85	(Bulgaria) Vesko Kozarov	P	7
(United States) Rearden Racing	Porsche 911 GT3 R (992)	Porsche M97/80 4.2 L Flat-6	85	(United States) Jake Pedersen	P	7
(United States) Racers Edge Motorsports with WTR-Andretti	Acura NSX GT3 Evo22	Acura JNC1 3.5 L Turbo V6	93	(Germany) Mario Farnbacher	P	All
(United States) Racers Edge Motorsports with WTR-Andretti	Acura NSX GT3 Evo22	Acura JNC1 3.5 L Turbo V6	93	(United States) Ashton Harrison	P	All
(United States) Racers Edge Motorsports with WTR-Andretti	Acura NSX GT3 Evo22	Acura JNC1 3.5 L Turbo V6	93	(Canada) Kyle Marcelli	P	7
(United States) Bimmerworld Racing	BMW M4 GT3	BMW S58B30T0 3.0 L Twin Turbo I6	94	(United States) Bill Auberlen	P	All
(United States) Bimmerworld Racing	BMW M4 GT3	BMW S58B30T0 3.0 L Twin Turbo I6	94	(United States) Chandler Hull	P	All
(United States) Bimmerworld Racing	BMW M4 GT3	BMW S58B30T0 3.0 L Twin Turbo I6	94	(United States) Robby Foley	P	7
(United Kingdom) Sky – Tempesta Racing	Ferrari 488 GT3 Evo 2020	Ferrari F154CB 3.9 L Turbo V8	535	(Italy) Eddie Cheever III	PA	7
(United Kingdom) Sky – Tempesta Racing	Ferrari 488 GT3 Evo 2020	Ferrari F154CB 3.9 L Turbo V8	535	(United Kingdom) Chris Froggatt	PA	7
(United Kingdom) Sky – Tempesta Racing	Ferrari 488 GT3 Evo 2020	Ferrari F154CB 3.9 L Turbo V8	535	(Hong Kong) Jonathan Hui	PA	7
(Hong Kong) Team GruppeM Racing	Mercedes-AMG GT3 Evo	Mercedes-AMG M159 6.2 L V8	999	(Germany) Maro Engel	P	7
(Hong Kong) Team GruppeM Racing	Mercedes-AMG GT3 Evo	Mercedes-AMG M159 6.2 L V8	999	(Spain) Daniel Juncadella	P	7
(Hong Kong) Team GruppeM Racing	Mercedes-AMG GT3 Evo	Mercedes-AMG M159 6.2 L V8	999	(Germany) Luca Stolz	P	7

Icon	Class
P	Pro Cup
PA	Pro/Am Cup
Am	Am Cup

=== Mid-season changes ===
- Aston Martin factory GT drivers Ross Gunn and Valentin Hasse-Clot split driving duties alongside Derek DeBoer at TRG-AMR. Gunn raced at the season-opener at Sonoma, then was replaced by Hasse-Clot for the next four meetings. Gunn returned at Sebring, and Hasse-Clot finished the season at Indianapolis with Ben Tuck also making his series debut.
- Neil Verhagen replaced John Edwards at ST Racing beginning at the fourth round in VIR.
- Adam Christodolou replaced Andy Pilgrim at RealTime Racing beginning at the fourth round in VIR. The number 43 car was moved up from Am to Pro-Am.
- Ziad Ghandour withdrew from the fourth round at VIR due to a personal commitment. The number 9 TR3 Racing car was moved up to the Pro class as Kenton Koch replaced Ghandour for the weekend. Ghandour missed the final two races of the season due to a family matter.
- Turner Motorsport, who ran full-time in 2022, returned for a one-off entry at VIR with Vincent Barletta and Robby Foley driving the number 096 BMW M4 GT3.
- Charlie Luck missed the final three rounds due to a kidney injury sustained in July. Wright Motorsports moved the number 45 car from the Pro-Am to the Pro category as Madison Snow replaced Luck for the remainder of the season.
- TR3 Racing added a second Mercedes-AMG GT3 for Paul Kiebler and Jon Branam which debuted in the Am class at Road America. At the Indianapolis 8 Hour, TR3 entered one car for Kiebler, Branam, and British driver Matthew Bell. On the morning of the race, Kiebler was replaced by Kenton Koch.
- Adam Adelson and Elliott Skeer drove the newest-generation Porsche 911 GT3 R (992) in the second race at Road America after crashing their 991.2-generation car in a crash during the first race. The 991.2 returned for the following round at Sebring, but the 992 raced at Indianapolis.
- Rearden Racing, who last competed in GT World Challenge America during the 2021 season, returned at the Indianapolis 8 Hour with a new Porsche 911 GT3 R.

== Race results ==
Bold indicates overall winner

Round		Circuit	Pole position	IGTC Pro Winners	Pro Winners	Pro/Am Winners	Am Winners	Ref.
1	R1	(California) Sonoma	(United States) #28 RennSport1 - CBW Racing	Did not participate	**(United States) #28 RennSport1 - CBW Racing**	(United States) #120 Wright Motorsports	(United States) #43 Bartone Bros Racing with RealTime	
1	R1	(California) Sonoma	(United States) Eric Filgueiras	Did not participate	**(United States) Eric Filgueiras** **(United Kingdom) Stevan McAleer**	(United States) Adam Adelson (United States) Elliott Skeer	(United States) Anthony Bartone (United Kingdom) Andy Pilgrim	
1	R2	(California) Sonoma	(Canada) #38 ST Racing	Did not participate	(United States) #93 Racers Edge Motorsports	**(United States) #04 CrowdStrike Racing by Riley Motorsports**	(United States) #43 Bartone Bros Racing with RealTime	
1	R2	(California) Sonoma	(United States) John Edwards	Did not participate	(United States) Ashton Harrison (Germany) Mario Farnbacher	**(United States) Colin Braun** **(United States) George Kurtz**	(United States) Anthony Bartone (United Kingdom) Andy Pilgrim	
2	R1	(Louisiana) NOLA	(United States) #28 RennSport1 - CBW Racing	Did not participate	**(United States) #28 RennSport1 - CBW Racing**	(United States) #120 Wright Motorsports	(United States) #43 Bartone Bros Racing with RealTime	
2	R1	(Louisiana) NOLA	(United States) Eric Filgueiras	Did not participate	**(United States) Eric Filgueiras** **(United Kingdom) Stevan McAleer**	(United States) Adam Adelson (United States) Elliott Skeer	(United States) Anthony Bartone (United Kingdom) Andy Pilgrim	
2	R2	(Louisiana) NOLA	(United States) #007 TRG-AMR	Did not participate	(United States) #94 Bimmerworld Racing	**(United States) #04 CrowdStrike Racing by Riley Motorsports**	(United States) #43 Bartone Bros Racing with RealTime	
2	R2	(Louisiana) NOLA	(France) Valentin Hasse-Clot	Did not participate	(United States) Bill Auberlen (United States) Chandler Hull	**(United States) Colin Braun** **(United States) George Kurtz**	(United States) Anthony Bartone (United Kingdom) Andy Pilgrim	
3	R1	(Texas) COTA	(United States) #28 RennSport1 - CBW Racing	Did not participate	(United States) #28 RennSport1 - CBW Racing	**(United States) #120 Wright Motorsports**	(United States) #43 Bartone Bros Racing with RealTime	
3	R1	(Texas) COTA	(United States) Eric Filgueiras	Did not participate	(United States) Eric Filgueiras (United Kingdom) Stevan McAleer	**(United States) Adam Adelson** **(United States) Elliott Skeer**	(United States) Anthony Bartone (United Kingdom) Andy Pilgrim	
3	R2	(Texas) COTA	(United States) #04 CrowdStrike Racing by Riley Motorsports	Did not participate	**(United States) #93 Racers Edge Motorsports**	(United States) #120 Wright Motorsports	(United States) #43 Bartone Bros Racing with RealTime	
3	R2	(Texas) COTA	(United States) Colin Braun	Did not participate	**(United States) Ashton Harrison** **(Germany) Mario Farnbacher**	(United States) Adam Adelson (United States) Elliott Skeer	(United States) Anthony Bartone (United Kingdom) Andy Pilgrim	
4	R1	Virginia	(United States) #9 TR3 Racing	Did not participate	**(United States) #9 TR3 Racing**	(United States) #04 CrowdStrike Racing by Riley Motorsports	No Entries	
4	R1	Virginia	(United States) Kenton Koch	Did not participate	**(United States) Kenton Koch** **(Canada) Daniel Morad**	(United States) Colin Braun (United States) George Kurtz	No Entries	
4	R2	Virginia	(United States) #096 Turner Motorsport	Did not participate	(United States) #9 TR3 Racing	**(United States) #04 CrowdStrike Racing by Riley Motorsports**	No Entries	
4	R2	Virginia	(United States) Robby Foley	Did not participate	(United States) Kenton Koch (Canada) Daniel Morad	**(United States) Colin Braun** **(United States) George Kurtz**	No Entries	
5	R1	(Wisconsin) Road America	(United States) #21 Conquest Racing	Did not participate	**(United States) #21 Conquest Racing**	(United States) #04 CrowdStrike Racing by Riley Motorsports	(United States) #77 TR3 Racing	
5	R1	(Wisconsin) Road America	(United States) Manny Franco	Did not participate	**(Italy) Alessandro Balzan** **(United States) Manny Franco**	(United States) Colin Braun (United States) George Kurtz	(United States) Jon Branam (United States) Paul Kiebler	
5	R2	(Wisconsin) Road America	(United States) #04 CrowdStrike Racing by Riley Motorsports	Did not participate	**(United States) #21 Conquest Racing**	(Canada) #38 ST Racing	(United States) #77 TR3 Racing†	
5	R2	(Wisconsin) Road America	(United States) Colin Braun	Did not participate	**(Italy) Alessandro Balzan** **(United States) Manny Franco**	(United States) Neil Verhagen (Canada) Samantha Tan	(United States) Jon Branam† (United States) Paul Kiebler†	
6	R1	(Florida) Sebring	(United States) #45 Wright Motorsports	Did not participate	**(United States) #45 Wright Motorsports**	(United States) #120 Wright Motorsports	No Entries	
6	R1	(Florida) Sebring	(United States) Madison Snow	Did not participate	**(Belgium) Jan Heylen** **(United States) Madison Snow**	(United States) Adam Adelson (United States) Elliott Skeer	No Entries	
6	R2	(Florida) Sebring	(United States) #33 Triarsi Competizione	Did not participate	**(United States) #45 Wright Motorsports**	(United States) #120 Wright Motorsports	No Entries	
6	R2	(Florida) Sebring	(United Kingdom) Ryan Dalziel	Did not participate	**(Belgium) Jan Heylen** **(United States) Madison Snow**	(United States) Adam Adelson (United States) Elliott Skeer	No Entries	
7		(Indiana) Indianapolis	(Germany) #20 Huber Motorsport	**(Belgium) #30 Team WRT**	(United States) #45 Wright Motorsports	(United States) #04 CrowdStrike Racing by Riley Motorsports	No Entries	
7		(Indiana) Indianapolis	(Germany) Laurin Heinrich	**(Austria) Philipp Eng** **(South Africa) Sheldon van der Linde** **(Belgium) Dries Vanthoor**	(Belgium) Jan Heylen (United States) Trent Hindman (United States) Madison Snow	(United States) Colin Braun (United States) George Kurtz (United States) Nolan Siegel	No Entries	

== Championship standings ==
Scoring system

Championship points are awarded for the first ten positions in each race. Entries are required to complete 75% of the winning car's race distance in order to be classified and earn points. Individual drivers are required to participate for a minimum of 40 minutes in order to earn championship points in any race. Race-by-race entries which only participated in either of the final two races of the season are not eligible for points.

Standard Points

Position	**1st**	**2nd**	**3rd**	**4th**	**5th**	**6th**	**7th**	**8th**	**9th**	**10th**
Points	25	18	15	12	10	8	6	4	2	1

Indianapolis Points

Position	**1st**	**2nd**	**3rd**	**4th**	**5th**	**6th**	**7th**	**8th**	**9th**	**10th**
Points	50	36	30	24	20	16	12	8	4	2

=== Drivers' championship ===
Pos.	Driver	Team	SON		NOL		COT		VIR		ELK		SEB		IND	Points
Pos.	Driver	Team	RD1	RD2	RD1	RD2	RD1	RD2	RD1	RD2	RD1	RD2	RD1	RD2	RDU	Points
Pro class
1	(United States) Eric Filgueiras (United Kingdom) Stevan McAleer	(United States) RennSport1 - CBW Racing	**1**	9	**1**	12	**2**	**2**	8	7	6	2	9	6	5	236
2	(Germany) Mario Farnbacher (United States) Ashton Harrison	(United States) Racers Edge Motorsports with WTR-Andretti	6	**5**	16	**16**	7	1	16	**5**	5	7	4	Ret	14	192
3	(United States) Trenton Estep (United States) Seth Lucas	(United States) MDK Motorsports	7	8	6	7	11	5	4	14	8	4	3	7	8	190
4	(United States) Bill Auberlen (United States) Chandler Hull	(United States) Bimmerworld Racing	5	11	3	2	Ret	13	2	9	2	14†	2	2	**20**†	186
5	(Italy) Alessandro Balzan (United States) Manny Franco	(United States) Conquest Racing	9	6	2	14	Ret	DNS	6	8	**1**	**1**	13	8	19	170
6	(Belgium) Jan Heylen (United States) Madison Snow	(United States) Wright Motorsports									7	11	**1**	**1**	4	120
7	(United States) Kenton Koch (Canada) Daniel Morad	(United States) TR3 Racing							**1**	3						50
Pro/Am class
1	(United States) Colin Braun (United States) George Kurtz	(United States) CrowdStrike Racing by Riley Motorsports	3	1	13	1	6	**Ret**	**3**	1	**3**	**15**†	**7**	5	6	237
2	(United States) Adam Adelson (United States) Elliott Skeer	(United States) Wright Motorsports	**2**	3	4	15	1	3	12	6	Ret	12	5	3	11	220
3	(United States) Derek DeBoer	(United States) TRG-AMR	12	10	7	**3**	5	4	9	15	9	8	8	10	13	160
4	(Canada) Samantha Tan	(Canada) ST Racing	17†	**7**	8	13	15†	8	5	2	4	3	6	DSQ	12	155
5	(France) Valentin Hasse-Clot	(United States) TRG-AMR			7	**3**	5	4	9	15	9	8			13	124
6	(United States) Neil Verhagen	(Canada) ST Racing							5	2	4	3	6	DSQ	12	121
7	(Belgium) Jan Heylen (United States) Charlie Luck	(United States) Wright Motorsports	8	4	17†	4	3	6	14	4						89
8	(United States) Bryan Sellers (United States) Scott Smithson	(United States) DXDT Racing	13	14	5	**17**	8	12	15	13	10	9	10	12	21†	89
9	(United Kingdom) Ryan Dalziel (United States) Justin Wetherill	(United States) Triarsi Competizione	14	17	14	10	9	9	7	11			11	**4**	18	88
10	(United States) Jeff Burton (United States) Corey Lewis	(United States) DXDT Racing	Ret	Ret	11	6	14†	7	11	Ret	11	5	14	11	Ret	77
11	(United States) Ziad Ghandour (Canada) Daniel Morad	(United States) TR3 Racing	11	2	9	11	10	10			12	13				62
12	(United States) Anthony Bartone (United Kingdom) Adam Christodoulou	(United States) Bartone Bros Racing with RealTime							10	12	15†	6	12	9		53
13	(United States) Spencer Pumpelly (Switzerland) Pedro Torres	(United States) ACI Motorsports	4	13	10	8	4	14	Ret	16†						52
14	(United Kingdom) Adam Carroll (United States) Will Hardeman	(United States) Mercedes-AMG Austin with Esses Racing	10	12	12	5	**13**	11			Ret	DNS				38
15	(United Kingdom) Ross Gunn	(United States) TRG-AMR	12	10									8	10		36
16	(United States) John Edwards	(Canada) ST Racing	17†	**7**	8	13	15†	8								34
17	(United States) Vin Barletta (United States) Robby Foley	(United States) Turner Motorsport							13	**10**						14
18	(Netherlands) Jeroen Bleekemolen (United States) Kyle Washington	(United States) GMG Racing									13	10				14
19	(United States) Tom Dyer (United States) James Sofronas	(United States) GMG Racing	16	16												2
Am class
1	(United States) Anthony Bartone (United Kingdom) Andy Pilgrim	(United States) Bartone Bros Racing with RealTime	**15**	**15**	**15**	**9**	**12**	**15**								150
2	(United States) Jon Branam (United States) Paul Kiebler	(United States) TR3 Racing									**14**	**16**†				50
Pos.	Driver	Team	SON		NOL		COT		VIR		ELK		SEB		IND	Points

Key
Colour	Result
Gold	Race winner
Silver	2nd place
Bronze	3rd place
Green	Points finish
Blue	Non-points finish
Blue	Non-classified finish (NC)
Purple	Did not finish (Ret)
Black	Disqualified (DSQ)
Black	Excluded (EX)
White	Did not start (DNS)
White	Race cancelled (C)
White	Withdrew (WD)
Blank	Did not participate

**Bold** – Pole
Italics – Fastest Lap

Notes

- † – Drivers did not finish the race but were classified, as they completed more than 75% of the race distance.

== See also ==
- 2023 GT World Challenge Europe
- 2023 GT World Challenge Europe Endurance Cup
- 2023 GT World Challenge Europe Sprint Cup
- 2023 GT World Challenge Asia
- 2023 GT World Challenge Australia
