= GetSpeed Performance =

German sports car racing team

(Germany) GetSpeed Performance
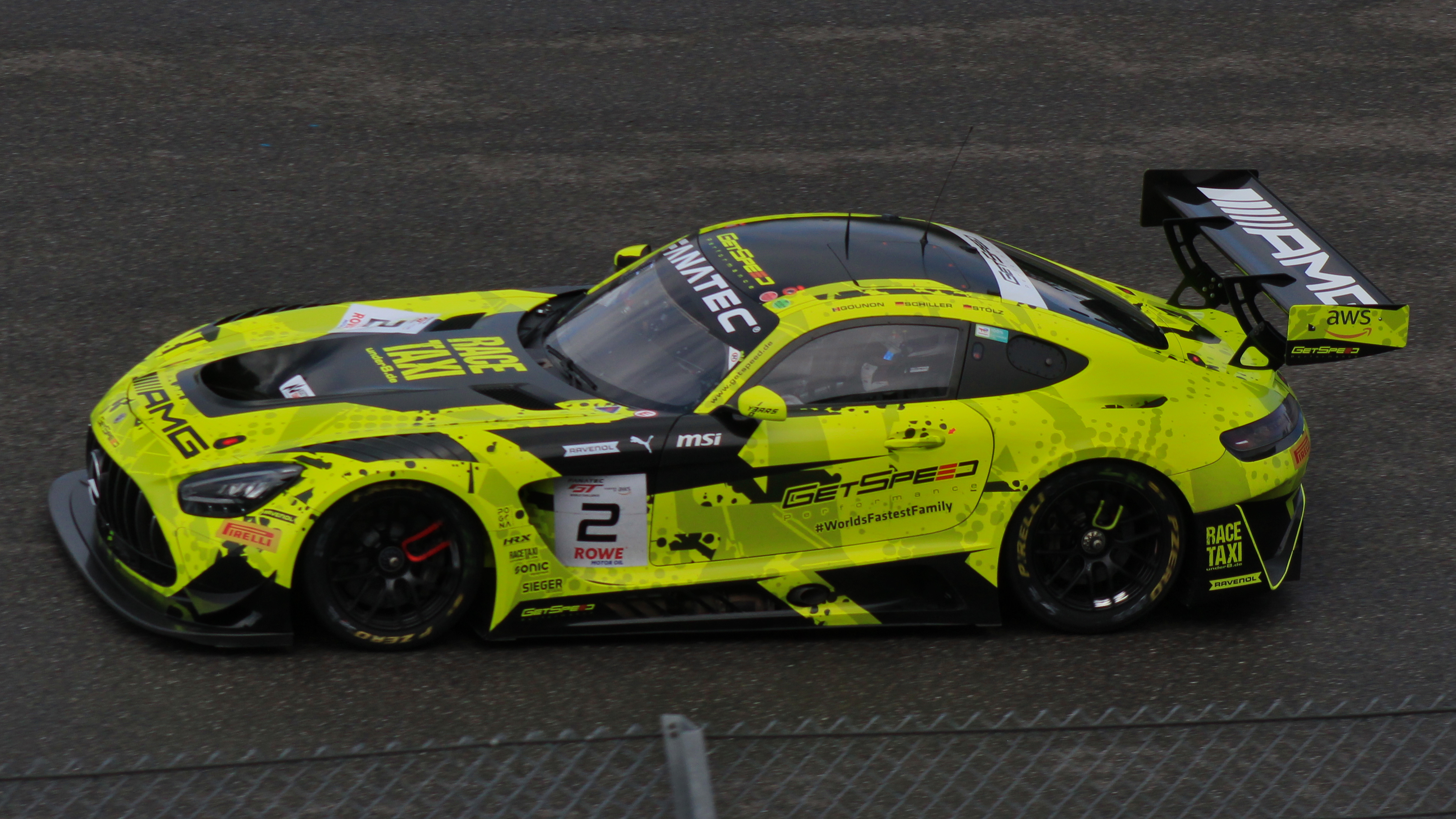
- Founded: 2012
- Founder(s): Adam Osieka
- Base: Meuspath, Germany; Niederzissen, Germany
- Current series: 24H Series; GT World Challenge Europe Endurance Cup; GT World Challenge Europe Sprint Cup; IMSA SportsCar Championship; Intercontinental GT Challenge; International GT Open; Le Mans Cup
- Former series: ADAC GT4 Germany; Belcar; Deutsche Tourenwagen Masters; Nürburgring Langstrecken-Serie; Ultimate Cup Series
- Current drivers: (United States) Anthony Bartone (France) Karol Basz (United Kingdom) Philip Ellis (Germany) Maro Engel (Germany) Maximilian Götz (Andorra) Jules Gounon (Canada) Mikaël Grenier (United States) Jason Hart (Luxembourg) Steve Jans (Germany) Tom Kalender (France) Marvin Klein (Belgium) Maxime Martin (France) Aurélien Panis (Belgium) Benjamin Paque (Germany) Fabian Schiller (South Africa) Jarrod Waberski
- Teams' Championships: 2020 GT Open Am
- Drivers' Championships: 2020 GT Open Am
- Website: getspeed.de/en

GetSpeed Performance GmbH is a German sports car racing team that currently competes in the GT World Challenge Europe as a Mercedes-AMG factory team. The team was founded by racing driver Adam Osieka in November 2012 in Meuspath, Germany.

GetSpeed began running Porsche 911 GT3 Cup cars at the VLN Series and Nürburgring 24 Hours, before stepping up to the SP9 (FIA GT3) class in 2018 and changing to Mercedes-AMG in 2019. The team then expanded into International GT Open and GT World Challenge Europe, and made its DTM debut in 2021, fielding a lone Mercedes-AMG GT3 Evo for Arjun Maini. The Indian rookie scored a podium at the Norisring.

In 2022, GetSpeed finished in second place overall at both the 24 Hours of Nürburgring and 24 Hours of Spa. The following year, it finished third in the GT World Challenge Europe Endurance Cup standings with the #777 AlManar Mercedes of Maro Engel, Fabian Schiller and Luca Stolz. In 2025, GetSpeed made its IMSA debut with a GTD Pro entry into the Rolex 24 at Daytona.

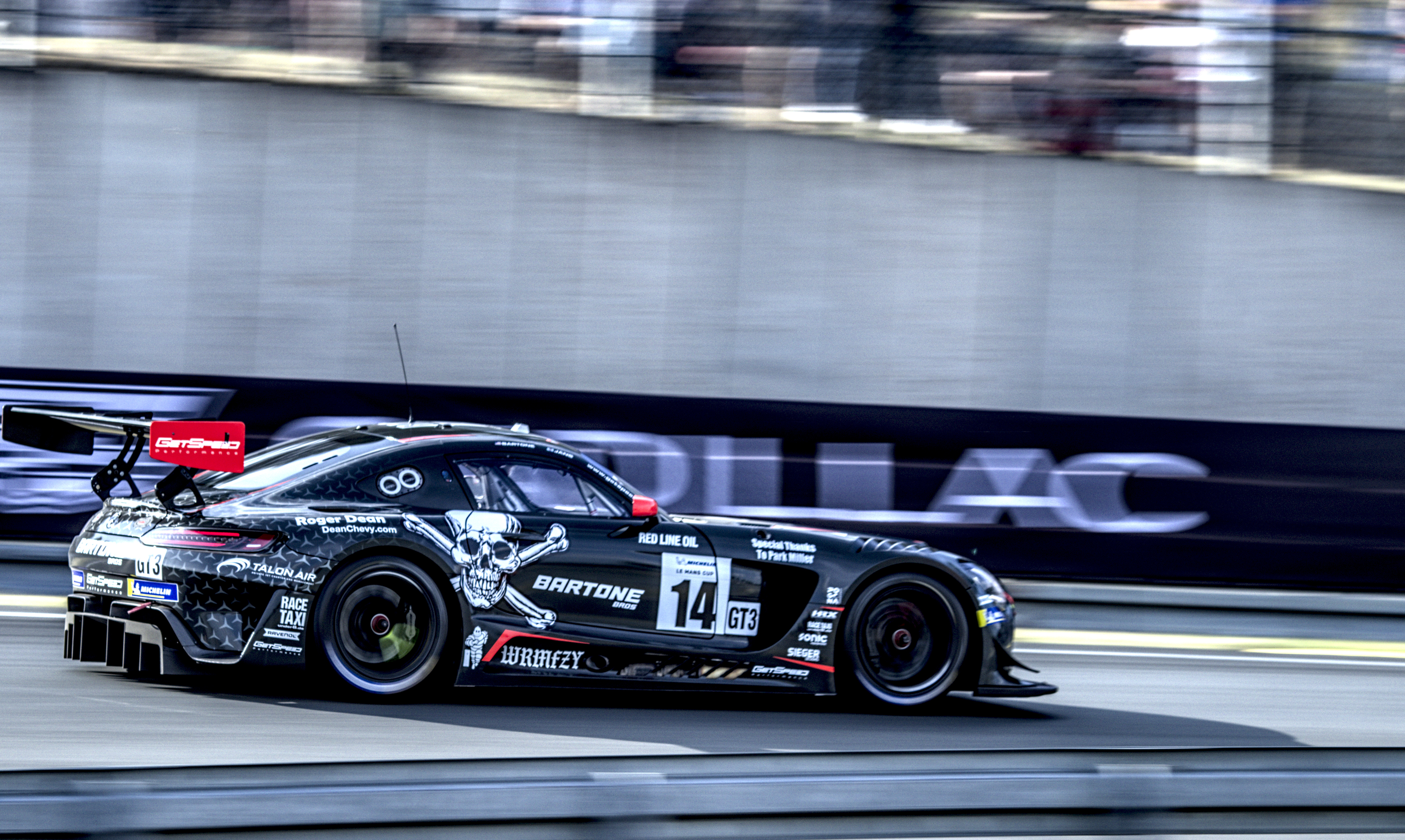
GetSpeed Performance at the 2025 Road to Le Mans

== Racing Record ==
=== Complete 24 Hours of Nürburgring results ===
Year	Entrant	No.	Car	Drivers	Class	Laps	Pos.	Class Pos.
2014	(Germany) GetSpeed Performance	60	Porsche 997 GT3 Cup	(France) Pascal Bour (France) Phlippe Haezebrouck (France) Patrick Henry	SP7	145	19th	6th
2014	(Germany) GetSpeed Performance	61	Porsche 997 GT3 Cup	(Germany) Adam Osieka (Luxembourg) Steve Jans (Germany) Dieter Schornstein (Germany) Andy Sammers	SP7	140	25th	7th
2015	(Germany) GetSpeed Performance	74	Porsche 997 GT3 Cup	(Germany) Ulrich Berg (Liechtenstein) Patrik Kaiser (France) Maxence Maurice (Argentina) Camilo Echevararria	SP7	135	27th	8th
2015	(Germany) GetSpeed Performance	75	Porsche 991 GT3 Cup	(Germany) Adam Osieka (Germany) Dieter Schornstein (Germany) "Andy Sammers" (United States) Dennis Trebing	SP7	141	21st	4th
2016	(Germany) GetSpeed Performance	62	Porsche 991 GT3 Cup	(Germany) Adam Osieka (Thailand) Kiki Nana (Germany) "Andy Sammers" (Luxembourg) Steve Jans	SP7	55	DNF	DNF
2016	(Germany) GetSpeed Performance	63	Porsche 991 GT3 Cup	(Germany) Ulrich Berg (Liechtenstein) Patrik Kaiser (United States) Dennis Trebing (Germany) Danny Brinkmann	SP7	82	DNF	DNF
2017	(Germany) Gigaspeed Team GetSpeed Performance	60	Porsche 991 GT3 Cup	(Germany) Adam Osieka (Germany) "Max" (Germany) "Jens" (United States) Dennis Trebing	SP7	139	39th	4th
2017	(Germany) Gigaspeed Team GetSpeed Performance	61	Porsche 991 GT3 Cup	(Germany) Ulrich Berg (Germany) Manuel Lauck (Germany) Andreas Sczepansky (Switzerland) Jean-Louis Hertenstein	SP7	120	84th	6th
2017	(Germany) Gigaspeed Team GetSpeed Performance	62	Porsche 991 GT3 Cup	(United States) Janine Hill (United States) John Shoffner (Germany) Arno Klasen (Netherlands) Duncan Huisman	SP7	141	32nd	**3rd**
2018	(Germany) Gigaspeed Team GetSpeed Performance	2	Porsche 911 GT3 R	(Germany) Marek Böckmann (Luxembourg) Steve Jans (Germany) Lucas Luhr (Germany) Jan-Erik Slooten	SP9	130	16th	15th
2018	(Germany) Gigaspeed Team GetSpeed Performance	57	Porsche 991 GT3 Cup	(United States) Janine Hill (Netherlands) Duncan Huisman (Germany) Arno Klasen (United States) John Shoffner	SP7	122	31st	4th
2018	(Germany) Gigaspeed Team GetSpeed Performance	59	Porsche 991 GT3 Cup	(Germany) Ulrich Berg (Switzerland) Jean-Louis Hertenstein (Czech Republic) Milan Kodidek (Germany) "Max"	SP7	105	82nd	5th
2019	(Germany) GetSpeed Performance	16	Mercedes-AMG GT3	(Netherlands) Renger van der Zande (France) Tristan Vautier (Germany) Jan Seyffarth (Germany) Kenneth Heyer	SP9 Pro	139	DNF	DNF
2019	(Germany) GetSpeed Performance	17	Mercedes-AMG GT3	(United States) Janine Hill (Finland) Markus Palttala (Germany) Fabian Schiller (United States) John Shoffner	SP9 Pro-Am	150	14th	6th
2019	(Germany) GetSpeed Performance	18	Mercedes-AMG GT3	(Switzerland) Philip Ellis (Germany) Luca Ludwig (Netherlands) Jules Szymkowiak (Germany) Fabian Vettel	SP9 Pro-Am	155	6th	**2nd**
2020	(Germany) GetSpeed Performance	8	Mercedes-AMG GT3 Evo	(France) Emmanuel Collard (Germany) Christer Jöns (France) François Perrodo (France) Matthieu Vaxivière	SP9 Pro-Am	5	DNF	DNF
2020	(Germany) Mercedes-AMG GetSpeed Performance	9	Mercedes-AMG GT3 Evo	(Germany) Maximilian Buhk (Germany) Maximilian Götz (Italy) Raffaele Marciello (Germany) Fabian Schiller	SP9 Pro	66	DNF	DNF
2020	(Germany) GetSpeed Performance	10	Mercedes-AMG GT3 Evo	(United States) Janine Hill (Finland) Markus Palttala (United States) John Shoffner (Belgium) Maxime Soulet	SP9 Pro-Am	79	17th	**3rd**
2021	(Germany) Mercedes-AMG GetSpeed Performance	7	Mercedes-AMG GT3 Evo	(Germany) Maximilian Götz (Italy) Raffaele Marciello (Spain) Daniel Juncadella (Germany) Fabian Schiller	SP9 Pro	59	**3rd**	**3rd**
2021	(Germany) Mercedes-AMG GetSpeed Performance	8	Mercedes-AMG GT3 Evo	(France) Jules Gounon (Germany) Dirk Müller (Germany) Fabian Schiller (France) Matthieu Vaxivière	SP9 Pro	59	7th	7th
2021	(Germany) GetSpeed Performance	9	Mercedes-AMG GT3 Evo	(Germany) Moritz Kranz (Finland) Markus Palttala (United States) John Shoffner (Belgium) Maxime Soulet	SP9 Pro-Am	58	14th	4th
2022	(Germany) Mercedes-AMG Team GetSpeed BWT	3	Mercedes-AMG GT3 Evo	(United Kingdom) Adam Christodoulou (Germany) Maximilian Götz (Germany) Fabian Schiller	SP9 Pro	159	**2nd**	**2nd**
2022	(Germany) Mercedes-AMG Team GetSpeed BWT	4	Mercedes-AMG GT3 Evo	(Germany) Maro Engel (France) Jules Gounon (Spain) Daniel Juncadella	SP9 Pro	159	**3rd**	**3rd**
2023	(Germany) Mercedes-AMG Team GetSpeed	2	Mercedes-AMG GT3 Evo	(United Kingdom) Adam Christodoulou (Germany) Maximilian Götz (Germany) Fabian Schiller	SP9 Pro	162	4th	4th
2023	(Germany) Mercedes-AMG Team GetSpeed	3	Mercedes-AMG GT3 Evo	(Germany) Maro Engel (Andorra) Jules Gounon (Spain) Daniel Juncadella	SP9 Pro	49	DNF	DNF
2024	(Germany) Mercedes-AMG Team GetSpeed	8	Mercedes-AMG GT3 Evo	(Austria) Lucas Auer (United Kingdom) Adam Christodoulou (Switzerland) Philip Ellis (Canada) Mikaël Grenier	SP9 Pro	42	DNF	DNF
2024	(Germany) Mercedes-AMG Team GetSpeed	130	Mercedes-AMG GT3 Evo	(United Kingdom) Adam Christodoulou (Germany) Maro Engel (Andorra) Jules Gounon (Germany) Fabian Schiller	SP9 Pro	34	DNF	DNF
2025	(Germany) Mercedes-AMG Team GetSpeed	14	Mercedes-AMG GT3 Evo	(Germany) Maro Engel (Belgium) Maxime Martin (Germany) Fabian Schiller (Germany) Luca Stolz	SP9 Pro	41	DNF	DNF
2025	(Germany) Mercedes-AMG Team GetSpeed	17	Mercedes-AMG GT3 Evo	(Estonia) Ralf Aron (Austria) Lucas Auer (United Kingdom) Adam Christodoulou (Canada) Mikaël Grenier	SP9 Pro	101	70th	6th

=== Complete 24 Hours of Spa results ===
Year	Entrant	No.	Car	Drivers	Class	Laps	Pos.	Class Pos.
2021	(Germany) GetSpeed Performance	2	Mercedes-AMG GT3 Evo	(Germany) Nico Bastian (Luxembourg) Olivier Grotz (Germany) Florian Scholze	Pro-Am Cup	376	DNF	DNF
2022	(Germany) BWT AMG Team GetSpeed	2	Mercedes-AMG GT3 Evo	(Germany) Maximilian Götz (Netherlands) Steijn Schothorst (Germany) Luca Stolz	Pro Cup	536	**2nd**	**2nd**
2022	(Germany) GetSpeed Performance	3	Mercedes-AMG GT3 Evo	(France) Sébastien Baud (Denmark) Valdemar Eriksen (Canada) Jeff Kingsley	Silver Cup	199	DNF	DNF
2022	(Germany) GetSpeed Performance	44	Mercedes-AMG GT3 Evo	(Germany) Patrick Assenheimer (France) Michael Blanchemain (Finland) Axel Blom (France) Jim Pla	Gold Cup	524	31st	5th
2023	(Germany) GetSpeed	2	Mercedes-AMG GT3 Evo	(United States) Lance Bergstein (Poland) Andrzej Lewandowski (United Kingdom) Aaron Walker (United Kingdom) Lewis Williamson	Pro-Am Cup	162	DNF	DNF
2023	(Germany) GetSpeed	3	Mercedes-AMG GT3 Evo	(Germany) Patrick Assenheimer (Germany) Kenneth Heyer (Australia) Alex Peroni (Germany) Florian Scholze	Bronze Cup	529	32nd	9th
2023	(Oman) Mercedes-AMG Team AlManar	77	Mercedes-AMG GT3 Evo	(Austria) Lucas Auer (Germany) Fabian Schiller (Germany) Luca Stolz	Pro Cup	536	9th	9th
2024	(Germany) Mercedes-AMG Team Getspeed	2	Mercedes-AMG GT3 Evo	(Andorra) Jules Gounon (Germany) Fabian Schiller (Germany) Luca Stolz	Pro Cup	283	DNF	DNF
2024	(Germany) GetSpeed	3	Mercedes-AMG GT3 Evo	(United States) Anthony Bartone (United Kingdom) James Kell (Switzerland) Yannick Mettler (United Kingdom) Aaron Walker	Silver Cup	474	25th	**1st**
2024	(Oman) AlManar Racing by Getspeed	777	Mercedes-AMG GT3 Evo	(Oman) Al Faisal Al Zubair (Austria) Dominik Baumann (Switzerland) Philip Ellis (Canada) Mikaël Grenier	Gold Cup	478	7th	**1st**
2025	(Germany) GetSpeed	3	Mercedes-AMG GT3 Evo	(United States) Anthony Bartone (Poland) Karol Basz (Germany) Tom Kalender (Switzerland) Yannick Mettler	Silver Cup	112	DNF	DNF
2025	(Germany) GetSpeed	6	Mercedes-AMG GT3 Evo	(Netherlands) Colin Caresani (Netherlands) Lin Hodenius (Thailand) Tanart Sathienthirakul (United Kingdom) Aaron Walker	Silver Cup	65	DNF	DNF
2025	(Germany) Mercedes-AMG Team Getspeed	17	Mercedes-AMG GT3 Evo	(Andorra) Jules Gounon (Germany) Fabian Schiller (Germany) Luca Stolz	Pro Cup	218	DNF	DNF
2026	(United States) GetSpeed Team Bartone Bros	6	Mercedes-AMG GT3 Evo	(United States) Anthony Bartone (Poland) Karol Basz (France) César Gazeau (France) Aurélien Panis	Silver Cup	532	28th	8th
2026	(United Arab Emirates) GetSpeed Team Dubai	12	Mercedes-AMG GT3 Evo	(Canada) Mikaël Grenier (Germany) Tom Kalender (Luxembourg) Gabriel Rindone (South Africa) Jarrod Waberski	Bronze Cup	379	47th	11th
2026	(Germany) Mercedes-AMG Team GetSpeed	17	Mercedes-AMG GT3 Evo	(Germany) Maximilian Götz (Belgium) Maxime Martin (Germany) Fabian Schiller	Pro Cup	70	DNF	DNF
2026	(Germany) GetSpeed Team PCX	999	Mercedes-AMG GT3 Evo	(France) Jordan Boisson (France) Patrick Charlaix (France) Marvin Klein (Belgium) Benjamin Paque	Pro-Am Cup	527	33rd	**3rd**

=== Complete Deutsche Tourenwagen Masters results ===
Year	Car	Drivers	Races	Wins	Poles	F/Laps	Podiums	Points	D.C.	T.C.
2021	Mercedes-AMG GT3 Evo	(India) Arjun Maini	15	0	0	0	1	48	12th	9th

=== Complete Asian Le Mans Series results ===
(key) (Races in bold indicate pole position; races in italics indicate fastest lap)

Year	Entrant	Class	No	Chassis	Engine	Drivers	1	2	3	4	5	6	Pos.	Pts
2023	(Germany) GetSpeed Performance	GT	10	Mercedes-AMG GT3 Evo	Mercedes-AMG M159 6.2 L V8	(Switzerland) Raffaele Marciello (Germany) Fabian Schiller (Germany) Florian Scholze	DUB; 1; 2	DUB; 2; 2	ABU; 1; 7	ABU; 2; 5			3rd	52
2023	(Germany) GetSpeed Performance	GT	16	Mercedes-AMG GT3 Evo	Mercedes-AMG M159 6.2 L V8	(China) Zhou Bihuang (Switzerland) Alexandre Imperatori (China) Wang Zhongwei	DUB; 1; 17	DUB; 2; 19	ABU; 1; 12	ABU; 2; 16			18th	0
2023–24	(Oman) AlManar Racing by GetSpeed	GT	7	Mercedes-AMG GT3 Evo	Mercedes-AMG M159 6.2 L V8	(Oman) Al Faisal Al Zubair (Germany) Fabian Schiller (Austria) Martin Konrad (Rounds 1–2) (China) Anthony Liu (Rounds 3–5)	SEP; 1; 4	SEP; 2; 4	**DUB**; 2	**ABU**; **1**; 9	ABU; 2; 8		4th	50
2023–24	(Germany) GetSpeed Performance	GT	9	Mercedes-AMG GT3 Evo	Mercedes-AMG M159 6.2 L V8	(United States) Anthony Bartone (United Kingdom) Aaron Walker (Luxembourg) Steve Jans (Rounds 1–2) (Austria) Martin Konrad (Rounds 3–5)	SEP; 1; 8	SEP; 2 Ret	DUB; Ret	ABU; 1; 15	**ABU**; **2** Ret		16th	5
2024–25	(Germany) GetSpeed Performance	GT	9	Mercedes-AMG GT3 Evo	Mercedes-AMG M159 6.2 L V8	(United States) Anthony Bartone (Luxembourg) Steve Jans (Germany) Fabian Schiller	**SEP**; **1**; 15	SEP; 2; 7	DUB; 1; 24	DUB; 2; 16	ABU; 1 Ret	ABU; 2; 17	17th	7
2025–26	(Germany) GetSpeed Performance	GT	9	Mercedes-AMG GT3 Evo	Mercedes-AMG M159 6.2 L V8	(United States) Anthony Bartone (Germany) Fabian Schiller (Japan) Shigekazu Wakisaka (Rounds 1–2) (Luxembourg) Steve Jans (Rounds 3–6)	SEP; 1; 1	SEP; 2; 6	DUB; 1; 7	DUB; 2; 6	**ABU**; **1** Ret	**ABU**; **2**; 2	4th	69
2025–26	(Qatar) QMMF by GetSpeed	GT	37	Mercedes-AMG GT3 Evo	Mercedes-AMG M159 6.2 L V8	(Qatar) Abdulla Al-Khelaifi (Austria) Lucas Auer (Qatar) Ghanim Al-Maadheed	SEP; 1; 19	SEP; 2; 10	**DUB**; **1**; 4	**DUB**; **2** Ret	ABU; 1; 5	ABU; 2; 16	9th	27

=== Complete IMSA SportsCar Championship results ===
(key) (Races in bold indicate pole position; races in italics indicate fastest lap)

Year	Entrant	Class	No	Chassis	Engine	Drivers	1	2	3	4	5	6	7	8	9	10	Pos.	Pts	MEC
2025	(Germany) Getspeed Performance	GTD Pro	69	Mercedes-AMG GT3 Evo	Mercedes-AMG M159 6.2 L V8	(United States) Anthony Bartone (Belgium) Maxime Martin (Germany) Fabian Schiller (Germany) Luca Stolz	DAY; 5	SEB	LGA	DET	WGL	MOS	ELK	VIR	IMS	PET	13th	280	8
2026	(Germany) Bartone Bros with GetSpeed	GTD Pro	69	Mercedes-AMG GT3 Evo	Mercedes-AMG M159 6.2 L V8	(United States) Anthony Bartone (Germany) Maximilian Götz (Andorra) Jules Gounon (Germany) Fabian Schiller	DAY; 11	SEB	LGA	DET	WGL	MOS	ELK	VIR	IMS	PET	16th*	225*	8*

* Season still in progress.
