= Anthony Bartone =

American racing driver (born 2000)

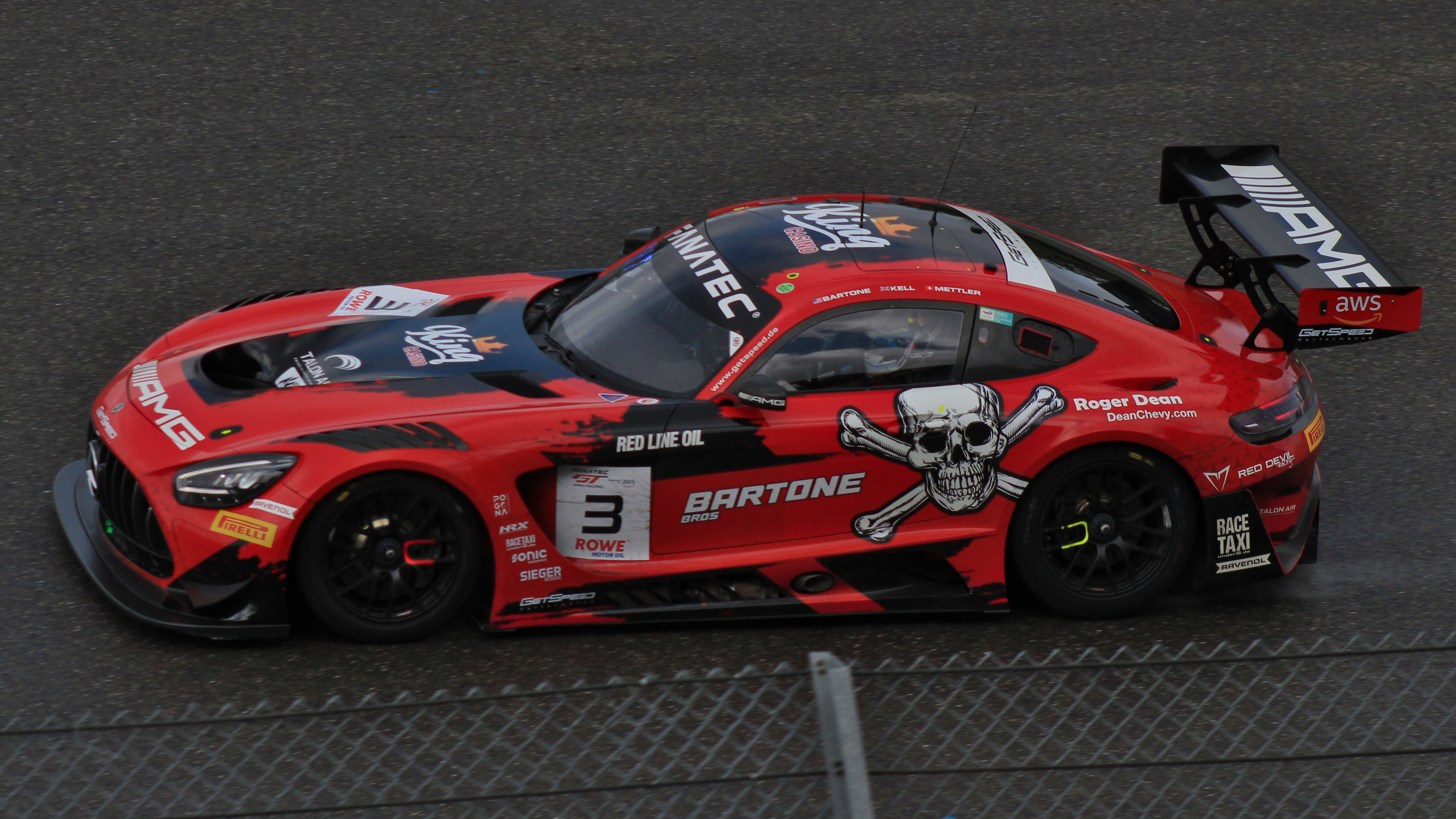
- Bartone in 2024
- Nationality: (United States) American
- Born: Anthony Bartone Jr. 27 April 2000 (age 26) Miami, Florida, U.S.
- Categorisation: FIA Silver

Championship titles
- 2023: GT World Challenge America – Am

Anthony Bartone Jr. (born 27 April 2000) is an American racing driver who last competed for GetSpeed Team Bartone Bros in GT World Challenge Europe.

== Personal life ==
Bartone is the son of Tony Bartone, a former drag racer and founder of Bartone Bros Racing. His uncle Michael was also a former drag racer.

== Career ==
In 2022, Bartone made his car racing debut in the GT4 America Series for Regal Motorsports alongside Andy Pilgrim. Bartone ran part-time for the team, taking a best result of 16th at NOLA, whilst also running part-time for the same team in the GT4 class of GT America, scoring a best result of tenth at Sebring.

Bartone stepped up to GT3 competition the following year, racing for his family team in both the GT America Series and GT World Challenge America. Driving for all but two rounds in the former, Bartone scored a lone win at Sonoma en route to a fifth-place points finish at season's end. In the latter, Bartone raced in the Am class in the first three rounds alongside Pilgrim, winning all six races before Adam Christodoulou replaced Pilgrim ahead of the round at VIR, thus moving the team's entry to the Pro-Am class. In the following three rounds, Bartone scored his only class podium of the season by finishing third in race two at Road America. At the end of the year, Bartone joined GetSpeed Performance to race on a part-time basis in International GT Open, and the GT class of the 2023–24 Asian Le Mans Series.

Moving to Europe full-time for 2024, Bartone returned to GetSpeed Performance to race full-time in both GT World Challenge Europe Endurance Cup and International GT Open. Racing in the Silver Cup in the former alongside James Kell and Yannick Mettler, Bartone scored a class win at the 24 Hours of Spa and finished fifth in the class standings. In the latter, Bartone shared his car with Fabian Schiller and won the season opening race at Algarve before scoring two further podiums to end the year fifth in points. During the year, Bartone also raced with the team for a one-off appearance in the Le Mans Cup alongside Steve Jans, and returned with them to contest the 2024–25 Asian Le Mans Series in the GT class.

Remaining with GetSpeed Performance for 2025, Bartone began the year by making his debut in the 24 Hours of Daytona in the GTD Pro class, in which he finished fifth. For the rest of the year, he raced with the team in both GT World Challenge Europe Endurance Cup and International GT Open. In the former, Bartone scored a best class result of fourth at Monza, whereas in GT Open, Bartone scored two second-place finishes at Le Castellet and Red Bull Ring and three further podiums to end the year seventh in points. During 2025, Bartone raced with the team in a one-off appearance in the 24 Hours of Le Mans-supporting round of the Le Mans Cup, in which he and co-driver Steve Jans won race one.

Bartone remained with GetSpeed Performance for the 2025–26 Asian Le Mans Series, securing a win at Sepang and ended the season with a podium at Abu Dhabi en route to a fourth-place points finish. Continuing with the German team for the rest of 2026, Bartone raced with them at the 24 Hours of Daytona in GTD Pro, as well as a dual campaign in both the GT World Challenge Europe Endurance and Sprint Cups. In the former, Bartone was fourth in the Silver class with podiums at the Nürburgring and Algarve, while in the latter he took a lone Silver Cup win at Misano to take fifth in the class standings. During 2026, Bartone finished on the podium in race one at Misano on a one-off return to International GT Open with GetSpeed. At the end of the year, Bartone continued with GetSpeed to race in the GT3 class of the 2026–27 Asian Le Mans Series.

== Racing record ==
=== Racing career summary ===
| Season | Series | Team | Races | Wins | Poles | F/Laps | Podiums | Points | Position |
|---|---|---|---|---|---|---|---|---|---|
| 2022 | GT4 America Series – Am | Regal Motorsports | 4 | 0 | 0 | 0 | 0 | 26 | 17th |
| 2022 | GT America Series – GT4 | Regal Motorsports LLC/Bartone Bros | 4 | 0 | 0 | 0 | 0 | 20 | 21st |
| 2023 | GT World Challenge America – Am | Bartone Bros Racing with RealTime | 6 | 6 | 0 | 0 | 6 | 150 | **1st** |
| 2023 | GT World Challenge America – Pro-Am | Bartone Bros Racing with RealTime | 6 | 0 | 0 | 0 | 1 | 53 | 12th |
| 2023 | GT America Series – GT3 | Bartone Bros Racing with RealTime | 14 | 1 | 0 | 0 | 1 | 137 | 5th |
| 2023 | International GT Open | GetSpeed | 4 | 0 | 0 | 0 | 0 | 10 | 21st |
| 2023–24 | Asian Le Mans Series – GT | GetSpeed Performance | 5 | 0 | 0 | 0 | 0 | 5 | 26th |
| 2023–24 | Middle East Trophy – GT3 Pro | GetSpeed Performance | 1 | 0 | 0 | 0 | 0 | 0 | NC |
| 2024 | International GT Open | GetSpeed | 13 | 1 | 2 | 4 | 3 | 88 | 5th |
| 2024 | GT World Challenge Europe Endurance Cup | GetSpeed | 5 | 0 | 0 | 0 | 0 | 0 | NC |
| 2024 | GT World Challenge Europe Endurance Cup – Silver | GetSpeed | 5 | 1 | 0 | 0 | 1 | 76 | 5th |
| 2024 | Le Mans Cup – GT3 | GetSpeed | 2 | 0 | 0 | 0 | 0 | 0 | NC† |
| 2024 | Intercontinental GT Challenge | GetSpeed | 1 | 0 | 0 | 0 | 0 | 1 | 25th |
| 2024–25 | Asian Le Mans Series – GT | GetSpeed Performance | 6 | 0 | 0 | 0 | 0 | 7 | 21st |
| 2025 | IMSA SportsCar Championship – GTD Pro | GetSpeed Performance | 1 | 0 | 0 | 0 | 0 | 280 | 29th |
| 2025 | International GT Open | GetSpeed Performance | 14 | 0 | 2 | 2 | 5 | 90 | 7th |
| 2025 | GT World Challenge Europe Endurance Cup | GetSpeed Performance | 5 | 0 | 0 | 0 | 0 | 0 | NC |
| 2025 | GT World Challenge Europe Endurance Cup – Silver | GetSpeed Performance | 5 | 0 | 0 | 0 | 0 | 22 | 18th |
| 2025 | Le Mans Cup – GT3 | GetSpeed Performance | 2 | 1 | 1 | 0 | 1 | 0 | NC† |
| 2025 | Intercontinental GT Challenge | GetSpeed Performance | 1 | 0 | 0 | 0 | 0 | 0 | NC |
| 2025–26 | Asian Le Mans Series – GT | GetSpeed Performance | 6 | 1 | 2 | 1 | 2 | 69 | 4th |
| 2026 | IMSA SportsCar Championship – GTD Pro | Bartone Bros with GetSpeed | 1 | 0 | 0 | 0 | 0 | 225 | 41st |
| 2026 | GT World Challenge Europe Endurance Cup | GetSpeed Team Bartone Bros | 5 | 0 | 0 | 0 | 0 | 4 | 30th |
| 2026 | GT World Challenge Europe Endurance Cup – Silver | GetSpeed Team Bartone Bros | 5 | 0 | 0 | 0 | 2 | 58 | 4th |
| 2026 | Intercontinental GT Challenge | GetSpeed Team Bartone Bros | 1 | 0 | 0 | 0 | 0 | 0 | NC |
| 2026 | GT World Challenge Europe Sprint Cup | GetSpeed Team Bartone Bros | 10 | 0 | 0 | 0 | 0 | 0 | NC |
| 2026 | GT World Challenge Europe Sprint Cup – Silver | GetSpeed Team Bartone Bros | 10 | 1 | 1 | 2 | 2 | 62 | 5th |
| 2026 | International GT Open | GetSpeed | 2 | 0 | 0 | 0 | 1 | 10 | 30th |
| 2026 | Le Mans Cup – GT3 | GetSpeed | 1 | 0 | 0 | 0 | 1 | 0 | NC† |
| 2026–27 | Asian Le Mans Series – GT3 | GetSpeed | | | | | | * | * |
| 2027 | IMSA SportsCar Championship – GTD Pro | Bartone Bros. Racing with GetSpeed | | | | | | | |

^{†} As Bartone was a guest driver, he was ineligible to score points.

=== Complete International GT Open results ===
(key) (Races in bold indicate pole position) (Races in italics indicate fastest lap)

| Year | Team | Car | Class | 1 | 2 | 3 | 4 | 5 | 6 | 7 | 8 | 9 | 10 | 11 | 12 | 13 | 14 | Pos. | Points |
|---|---|---|---|---|---|---|---|---|---|---|---|---|---|---|---|---|---|---|---|
| 2023 | GetSpeed | Mercedes-AMG GT3 Evo | Pro | ALG; 1 | ALG; 2 | SPA | HUN; 1 | HUN; 2 | LEC; 1 | LEC; 2 | RBR; 1; 10 | RBR; 2; 7 | MNZ; 1 | MNZ; 2 | CAT; 1; 6 | CAT; 2; 25 | | 21st | 10 |
| 2024 | GetSpeed | Mercedes-AMG GT3 Evo | Pro | ALG; 1; 1 | ALG; 2; 7 | HOC; 1; 10 | HOC; 2 Ret | SPA; 5 | HUN; 1; 27† | HUN; 2; 4 | LEC; 1; 2 | LEC; 2; 4 | RBR; 1; 4 | RBR; 2 DNS | CAT; 1; 2 | CAT; 2; 9 | MNZ; 8 | 5th | 88 |
| 2025 | GetSpeed | Mercedes-AMG GT3 Evo | Pro | ALG; 1; 3 | ALG; 2; 7 | SPA; 3 | HOC; 1; 15 | HOC; 2; 5 | HUN; 1; 13 | HUN; 2; 6 | LEC; 1; 2 | LEC; 2; 5 | RBR; 1; 2 | RBR; 2; 10 | CAT; 1; 3 | CAT; 2; 9 | MNZ; 10 | 7th | 90 |
| 2026 | GetSpeed | Mercedes-AMG GT3 Evo | Pro | ALG; 1 | ALG; 2 | SPA | MIS; 1; 3 | MIS; 2 Ret | HUN; 1 | HUN; 2 | LEC; 1 | LEC; 2 | HOC; 1 | HOC; 2 | MNZ | CAT; 1 | CAT; 2 | 30th | 10 |

=== Complete Asian Le Mans Series results ===
(key) (Races in bold indicate pole position) (Races in italics indicate fastest lap)

| Year | Team | Class | Car | Engine | 1 | 2 | 3 | 4 | 5 | 6 | Pos. | Points |
|---|---|---|---|---|---|---|---|---|---|---|---|---|
| 2023–24 | GetSpeed Performance | GT | Mercedes-AMG GT3 Evo | Mercedes-AMG M159 6.2 L V8 | SEP; 1; 8 | SEP; 2 Ret | DUB; Ret | ABU; 1; 15 | ABU; 2 Ret | | 26th | 5 |
| 2024–25 | GetSpeed Performance | GT | Mercedes-AMG GT3 Evo | Mercedes-AMG M159 6.2 L V8 | **SEP**; **1**; 15 | SEP; 2; 7 | DUB; 1; 24 | DUB; 2; 16 | ABU; 1 Ret | ABU; 2; 17 | 21st | 7 |
| 2025–26 | GetSpeed Performance | GT | Mercedes-AMG GT3 Evo | Mercedes-AMG M159 6.2 L V8 | SEP; 1; 1 | SEP; 2; 6 | DUB; 1; 7 | DUB; 2; 6 | **ABU**; **1** Ret | **ABU**; **2**; 2 | 4th | 69 |

=== Complete GT World Challenge Europe results ===
==== GT World Challenge Europe Endurance Cup ====
(key) (Races in bold indicate pole position) (Races in italics indicate fastest lap)

| Year | Team | Car | Class | 1 | 2 | 3 | 4 | 5 | 6 | 7 | Pos. | Points |
|---|---|---|---|---|---|---|---|---|---|---|---|---|
| 2024 | GetSpeed | Mercedes-AMG GT3 Evo | Silver | LEC; 39 | SPA; 6H; 33 | SPA; 12H; 14 | SPA; 24H; 25 | NÜR; 41 | MNZ; 35 | JED; 30 | 5th | 76 |
| 2025 | GetSpeed | Mercedes-AMG GT3 Evo | Silver | LEC; 43 | MNZ; 18 | SPA; 6H; 64† | SPA; 12H; 66† | SPA; 24H; Ret | NÜR; 27 | BAR; 27 | 18th | 22 |
| 2026 | GetSpeed Team Bartone Bros | Mercedes-AMG GT3 Evo | Silver | LEC; 33 | MNZ; 13 | SPA; 6H; 33 | SPA; 12H; 26 | **SPA**; **24H**; 28 | NÜR; 20 | ALG; 8 | 4th | 58 |

==== Complete GT World Challenge Europe Sprint Cup results ====
(key) (Races in bold indicate pole position) (Races in italics indicate fastest lap)

| Year | Team | Car | Class | 1 | 2 | 3 | 4 | 5 | 6 | 7 | 8 | 9 | 10 | Pos. | Points |
|---|---|---|---|---|---|---|---|---|---|---|---|---|---|---|---|
| 2026 | GetSpeed Team Bartone Bros | Mercedes-AMG GT3 Evo | Silver | BRH; 1; 17 | BRH; 2; 29 | MIS; 1; 19 | **MIS**; **2**; 13 | MAG; 1; 25 | MAG; 2; 20 | ZAN; 1; 36 | ZAN; 2; 26 | CAT; 1; 34 | CAT; 2; 22 | 5th | 62 |

=== Complete IMSA SportsCar Championship results ===
(key) (Races in bold indicate pole position; results in italics indicate fastest lap)

| | Team | Class | Make | Engine | 1 | 2 | 3 | 4 | 5 | 6 | 7 | 8 | 9 | 10 | Pos. | Points |
|---|---|---|---|---|---|---|---|---|---|---|---|---|---|---|---|---|
| 2025 | GetSpeed | GTD Pro | Mercedes-AMG GT3 Evo | Mercedes-AMG M159 6.2 L V8 | DAY; 5 | SEB | LGA | DET | WGL | MOS | ELK | VIR | IMS | PET | 29th | 280 |
| 2026 | Bartone Bros with GetSpeed | GTD Pro | Mercedes-AMG GT3 Evo | Mercedes-AMG M159 6.2 L V8 | DAY; 11 | SEB | LGA | DET | WGL | MOS | ELK | VIR | IMS | PET | 41st | 225 |
