= 2018 French GT4 Cup =

The 2018 Championnat de France FFSA GT - French GT4 Cup was the twenty-first season of the French FFSA GT Championship and the first as the French GT4 Cup, a sports car championship created and organised by the Stéphane Ratel Organisation (SRO). The season began on 1 April in Nogaro and ended on 14 October at Paul Ricard.

== Calendar ==
At the annual press conference during the 2017 24 Hours of Spa on 28 July, the Stéphane Ratel Organisation announced the first draft of the 2018 calendar. No changes were made to the schedule compared to 2017. The finalised calendar confirmed the races in Pau were moved one week earlier and it confirmed the dates of the races at Dijon-Prenois.

| Round | Circuit | Date | Supporting |
|---|---|---|---|
| 1 | Circuit Paul Armagnac, Nogaro, France | 1–2 April | Coupes de Pâques |
| 2 | Circuit de Pau-Ville, Pau, France | 12–13 May | Pau Grand Prix |
| 3 | Dijon-Prenois, Prenois, France | 14–15 July | Standalone event |
| 4 | Circuit de Nevers Magny-Cours, Magny-Cours, France | 8–9 September | Standalone event |
| 5 | Circuit de Barcelona-Catalunya, Montmeló, Spain | 29–30 September | Blancpain GT Series Endurance Cup |
| 6 | Circuit Paul Ricard, Le Castellet, France | 13–14 October | Standalone event |

== Entry list ==
| Team | Car | No. | Drivers | Class | Rounds |
|---|---|---|---|---|---|
| (Spain) CD Sport | Porsche Cayman GT4 Clubsport MR | 1 | (France) Christophe Lapierre | PA | All |
| (Spain) CD Sport | Porsche Cayman GT4 Clubsport MR | 1 | (France) Mike Parisy | PA | All |
| (Spain) CD Sport | Porsche Cayman GT4 Clubsport MR | 2 | (France) Rémy Deguffroy | PA | 1–4 |
| (Spain) CD Sport | Porsche Cayman GT4 Clubsport MR | 2 | (France) Valentin Simonet | PA | 1–3 |
| (Spain) CD Sport | Porsche Cayman GT4 Clubsport MR | 2 | (French Guiana) Gavin Aimable | PA | 4 |
| (Spain) CD Sport | Porsche Cayman GT4 Clubsport MR | 2 | (France) Florian Latorre | PA | 5 |
| (Spain) CD Sport | Porsche Cayman GT4 Clubsport MR | 2 | (France) Gilles Vannelet | PA | 5 |
| (Spain) CD Sport | Porsche Cayman GT4 Clubsport MR | 2 | (French Guiana) Gavin Aimable | Am | 6 |
| BMW Team France | BMW M4 GT4 | 3 | (France) Laurent Hurgon | PA | All |
| BMW Team France | BMW M4 GT4 | 3 | (France) Julien Piguet | PA | All |
| BMW Team France | Ekris M4 GT4 | 6 | (France) Jean-Claude Lagniez | Am | 1 |
| BMW Team France | Ekris M4 GT4 | 6 | (Portugal) Carlos Sarrea | Am | 1 |
| BMW Team France | Ekris M4 GT4 | 9 | (France) Elie Dubelly | Am | All |
| BMW Team France | Ekris M4 GT4 | 9 | (France) Laurent Fresnais | Am | All |
| (France) Speed Car | Ginetta G55 GT4 | 4 | (France) Rodolphe Wallgren | Am | All |
| (France) Speed Car | Ginetta G55 GT4 | 7 | (France) Pierre Courroye | PA | All |
| (France) Speed Car | Ginetta G55 GT4 | 7 | (Sweden) Douglas Lundberg | PA | All |
| (France) Speed Car | Ginetta G55 GT4 | 8 | (France) Robert Consani | PA | All |
| (France) Speed Car | Ginetta G55 GT4 | 8 | (France) Benjamin Lariche | PA | All |
| (France) Saintéloc Racing | Audi R8 LMS GT4 | 5 | (France) Christophe Hamon | PA | All |
| (France) Saintéloc Racing | Audi R8 LMS GT4 | 5 | (France) Lonni Martins | PA | All |
| (France) Saintéloc Racing | Audi R8 LMS GT4 | 21 | (France) Anthony Beltoise | PA | All |
| (France) Saintéloc Racing | Audi R8 LMS GT4 | 21 | (France) Olivier Estèves | PA | All |
| (France) Saintéloc Racing | Audi R8 LMS GT4 | 40 | (France) Simon Gachet | PA | 3 |
| (France) Saintéloc Racing | Audi R8 LMS GT4 | 40 | (France) Bruno Hernandez | PA | 3 |
| (France) Saintéloc Racing | Audi R8 LMS GT4 | 40 | (France) Christian Bottemanne | PA | 6 |
| (France) Saintéloc Racing | Audi R8 LMS GT4 | 40 | (France) Sacha Bottemanne | PA | 6 |
| (France) Saintéloc Racing | Audi R8 LMS GT4 | 42 | (France) Grégory Guilvert | PA | All |
| (France) Saintéloc Racing | Audi R8 LMS GT4 | 42 | (France) Fabien Michal | PA | All |
| (Spain) Baporo Motorsport | Audi R8 LMS GT4 | 10 | (Andorra) Manel Cerqueda | Am | All |
| (Spain) Baporo Motorsport | Audi R8 LMS GT4 | 10 | (Spain) Daniel Díaz-Varela | Am | All |
| (France) Racing Technology | Porsche Cayman GT4 Clubsport MR | 11 | (Switzerland) Jimmy Antunes | PA | 1, 3–6 |
| (France) Racing Technology | Porsche Cayman GT4 Clubsport MR | 11 | (France) Sylvain Noël | PA | 1, 3–6 |
| (France) Racing Technology | Porsche Cayman GT4 Clubsport MR | 44 | (France) Pascal Huteau | Am | 1, 3–6 |
| (France) Racing Technology | Porsche Cayman GT4 Clubsport MR | 44 | (France) Arnaud Noël | Am | 1 |
| (France) Racing Technology | Porsche Cayman GT4 Clubsport MR | 44 | (France) Jean-Luc Deblangey | Am | 3 |
| (France) Racing Technology | Porsche Cayman GT4 Clubsport MR | 44 | (France) Christian Blugeon | Am | 4 |
| (France) Racing Technology | Porsche Cayman GT4 Clubsport MR | 44 | (France) Denis Papin | Am | 5 |
| (France) Racing Technology | Porsche Cayman GT4 Clubsport MR | 44 | (France) Jérôme Boullery | Am | 6 |
| (France) K'Worx Racing | Ginetta G55 GT4 | 13 | (France) Michel Ghio | Am | 5–6 |
| (France) K'Worx Racing | Ginetta G55 GT4 | 13 | (France) Éric Martin | Am | 5–6 |
| (France) K'Worx Racing | Ginetta G55 GT4 | 94 | (France) Thomas Hodier | PA | 4–6 |
| (France) K'Worx Racing | Ginetta G55 GT4 | 94 | (France) Nelson Lukes | PA | 4–5 |
| (France) K'Worx Racing | Ginetta G55 GT4 | 94 | (France) Valentin Simonet | PA | 6 |
| (Switzerland) Cool Racing | Porsche Cayman GT4 Clubsport MR | 14 | (France) Cyril Saleilles | Am | All |
| (Switzerland) Cool Racing | Porsche Cayman GT4 Clubsport MR | 18 | (France) Clément Dub | Am | All |
| (Switzerland) Cool Racing | Porsche Cayman GT4 Clubsport MR | 18 | (France) Laurent Dub | Am | All |
| (Spain) NM Racing Team | Ginetta G55 GT4 | 15 | (Spain) Lluc Ibáñez | PA | 5 |
| (Spain) NM Racing Team | Ginetta G55 GT4 | 15 | (Spain) Xavier Lloveras | PA | 5 |
| (France) L'Espace Bienvenue | BMW M4 GT4 | 17 | (Netherlands) Ricardo van der Ende | PA | All |
| (France) L'Espace Bienvenue | BMW M4 GT4 | 17 | (France) André Grammatico | PA | 1–3 |
| (France) L'Espace Bienvenue | BMW M4 GT4 | 17 | (France) Eric Debard | PA | 4–6 |
| (Germany) Team GT | McLaren 570S GT4 | 22 | (Germany) Christian Danner | Am | 6 |
| (Germany) Team GT | McLaren 570S GT4 | 22 | (Germany) Bernhard Laber | Am | 6 |
| (France) AGS Events | Porsche Cayman GT4 Clubsport MR | 25 | (France) Nicolas Gomar | Am | All |
| (France) AGS Events | Porsche Cayman GT4 Clubsport MR | 25 | (France) Julien Lambert | Am | All |
| (France) AGS Events | Porsche Cayman GT4 Clubsport MR | 72 | (France) Christophe Carrière | PA | 1 |
| (France) AGS Events | Porsche Cayman GT4 Clubsport MR | 72 | (Switzerland) Lucas Mauron | PA | 1 |
| (France) AGS Events | Porsche Cayman GT4 Clubsport MR | 72 | (France) Christophe Carrière | Am | 2, 4–6 |
| (France) AGS Events | Porsche Cayman GT4 Clubsport MR | 72 | (France) Manu Damiani | Am | 2 |
| (France) AGS Events | Porsche Cayman GT4 Clubsport MR | 72 | (France) Didier Dumaine | Am | 4–6 |
| (France) AGS Events | Porsche Cayman GT4 Clubsport MR | 79 | (France) Eric Herr | Am | All |
| (France) AGS Events | Porsche Cayman GT4 Clubsport MR | 79 | (France) Lauris Nauroy | Am | All |
| (France) CMR | Ginetta G55 GT4 | 26 | (France) Soheil Ayari | PA | 1–2 |
| (France) CMR | Ginetta G55 GT4 | 26 | (France) Nicolas Tardif | PA | 1–2 |
| (France) CMR | Alpine A110 GT4 | 26 | (France) Soheil Ayari | PA | 3–6 |
| (France) CMR | Alpine A110 GT4 | 26 | (France) Nicolas Tardif | PA | 3–6 |
| (France) CMR | Ginetta G55 GT4 | 30 | (France) Christopher Cappello | Am | 3–6 |
| (France) CMR | Ginetta G55 GT4 | 30 | (France) Alexis Berthet | Am | 3 |
| (France) CMR | Ginetta G55 GT4 | 30 | (France) Georges Cabanne | Am | 4–6 |
| (France) CMR | Ginetta G55 GT4 | 31 | (France) Franck Quesada | Am | 3–4 |
| (France) CMR | Ginetta G55 GT4 | 31 | (France) Sébastien Quesada | Am | 3–4 |
| (France) CMR | Ginetta G55 GT4 | 31 | (France) Benjamin Cormoreche | Am | 6 |
| (France) CMR | Ginetta G55 GT4 | 31 | (France) Didier Cormoreche | Am | 6 |
| (France) CMR | Ginetta G55 GT4 | 36 | (France) Pierre-Alexandre Jean | PA | 1–2 |
| (France) CMR | Ginetta G55 GT4 | 36 | (France) Stéphane Tribaudini | PA | 1–2 |
| (France) CMR | Alpine A110 GT4 | 36 | (France) Pierre-Alexandre Jean | PA | 3–6 |
| (France) CMR | Alpine A110 GT4 | 36 | (France) Stéphane Tribaudini | PA | 3 |
| (France) CMR | Alpine A110 GT4 | 36 | (France) Pierre Sancinéna | PA | 4–6 |
| (France) CMR | Ginetta G55 GT4 | 666 | (France) Wilfried Cazalbon | Am | All |
| (France) CMR | Ginetta G55 GT4 | 666 | (France) Jérémy Reymond | Am | 1–2, 4 |
| (France) CMR | Ginetta G55 GT4 | 666 | (France) Louis Rousset | Am | 3 |
| (France) CMR | Ginetta G55 GT4 | 666 | (France) Thomas Nicolle | Am | 6 |
| (France) IMSA Performance | Porsche Cayman GT4 Clubsport MR | 27 | (France) Michael Blanchemain | PA | All |
| (France) IMSA Performance | Porsche Cayman GT4 Clubsport MR | 27 | (France) Steven Palette | PA | All |
| (France) / SDA Sport / TFT Racing (Note: Car No. 32 entered as SDA Sport / TFT Racing and car No. 218 entered as TFT Racing.); (France) / TFT Racing | BMW M4 GT4 | 32 | (France) Bernard Salam | Am | 1, 3 |
| (France) / SDA Sport / TFT Racing; (France) / TFT Racing | BMW M4 GT4 | 32 | (France) Olivier Salam | Am | 1, 3 |
| (France) / SDA Sport / TFT Racing; (France) / TFT Racing | Porsche Cayman GT4 Clubsport MR | 218 | (Switzerland) Jonathan Hirschi | PA | 6 |
| (France) / SDA Sport / TFT Racing; (France) / TFT Racing | Porsche Cayman GT4 Clubsport MR | 218 | (Switzerland) Pierre Hirschi | PA | 6 |
| (France) GP34 by Gemo Motorsport | Maserati GranTurismo MC GT4 | 34 | (France) Arnaud Gomez | Am | 1, 3, 5–6 |
| (France) GP34 by Gemo Motorsport | Maserati GranTurismo MC GT4 | 34 | (France) Olivier Gomez | Am | 1, 3, 5–6 |
| (France) GP34 by Gemo Motorsport | Ginetta G55 GT4 | 34 | (France) Alexandre Guesdon | Am | 4 |
| (France) GP34 by Gemo Motorsport | Ginetta G55 GT4 | 34 | (France) Guillaume Maio | Am | 4 |
| (France) GM-Sport | Ginetta G55 GT4 | 39 | (France) Guillaume Maio | PA | 1 |
| (France) GM-Sport | Ginetta G55 GT4 | 39 | (France) Morgan Moullin-Traffort | PA | 1 |
| (France) GM-Sport | Ginetta G55 GT4 | 39 | (France) Guillaume Maio | Am | 3, 6 |
| (France) GM-Sport | Ginetta G55 GT4 | 39 | (France) Alexandre Guesdon | Am | 3 |
| (France) GM-Sport | Ginetta G55 GT4 | 39 | (France) Gilles Vannelet | Am | 6 |
| (France) Orhès Racing | Audi R8 LMS GT4 | 48 | (France) Philippe Marie | Am | All |
| (France) Orhès Racing | Audi R8 LMS GT4 | 48 | (France) Olivier Pernaut | Am | All |
| (United Arab Emirates) 3Y Technology | BMW M4 GT4 | 50 | (France) Christian Philippon | Am | 1–2, 6 |
| (United Arab Emirates) 3Y Technology | BMW M4 GT4 | 50 | (France) Franck Labescat | Am | 1 |
| (United Arab Emirates) 3Y Technology | BMW M4 GT4 | 50 | (France) Romain Brandela | Am | 2–4 |
| (United Arab Emirates) 3Y Technology | BMW M4 GT4 | 50 | (France) Sébastien Pineau | Am | 3 |
| (United Arab Emirates) 3Y Technology | BMW M4 GT4 | 50 | (France) Michaël Petit | Am | 4 |
| (United Arab Emirates) 3Y Technology | BMW M4 GT4 | 50 | (France) Jean-Paul Buffin | Am | 6 |
| (United Arab Emirates) 3Y Technology | BMW M4 GT4 | 50 | (India) Akhil Rabindra | PA | 5 |
| (United Arab Emirates) 3Y Technology | BMW M4 GT4 | 50 | (Netherlands) Beitske Visser | PA | 5 |
| (United Arab Emirates) 3Y Technology | BMW M4 GT4 | 77 | (France) Alain Grand | Am | All |
| (United Arab Emirates) 3Y Technology | BMW M4 GT4 | 77 | (France) Didier Moureu | Am | All |
| (United Arab Emirates) 3Y Technology | BMW M4 GT4 | 100 | (France) Romain Monti | PA | All |
| (United Arab Emirates) 3Y Technology | BMW M4 GT4 | 100 | (France) Ronald Basso | PA | 1, 3–5 |
| (United Arab Emirates) 3Y Technology | BMW M4 GT4 | 100 | (France) Éric Cayrolle | PA | 2 |
| (United Arab Emirates) 3Y Technology | BMW M4 GT4 | 100 | (France) Romain Brandela | PA | 6 |
| (United Arab Emirates) 3Y Technology | BMW M4 GT4 | 101 | (France) Enzo Guibbert | PA | 4 |
| (United Arab Emirates) 3Y Technology | BMW M4 GT4 | 101 | (France) Gilles Vannelet | PA | 4 |
| (United Arab Emirates) 3Y Technology | BMW M4 GT4 | 101 | (France) Sylvain Debs | PA | 6 |
| (United Arab Emirates) 3Y Technology | BMW M4 GT4 | 101 | (France) Stéphane Tribaudini | PA | 6 |
| (France) Zentech Sport | Alpine A110 GT4 | 61 | (France) Jean-Bernard Bouvet | PA | 6 |
| (France) Zentech Sport | Alpine A110 GT4 | 61 | (France) Bruno Miot | PA | 6 |
| (France) Vic Team | Porsche Cayman GT4 Clubsport MR | 64 | (France) Olivier Jouffret | PA | All |
| (France) Vic Team | Porsche Cayman GT4 Clubsport MR | 64 | (France) Eric Trémoulet | PA | All |
| (France) M Racing - YMR | Mercedes-AMG GT4 | 68 | (France) Yann Ehrlacher | PA | 1, 4, 6 |
| (France) M Racing - YMR | Mercedes-AMG GT4 | 68 | (France) Laurent Millara | PA | 1, 6 |
| (France) M Racing - YMR | Mercedes-AMG GT4 | 68 | (France) Alexandre Bardinon | PA | 3–5 |
| (France) M Racing - YMR | Mercedes-AMG GT4 | 68 | (France) Thomas Laurent | PA | 3, 5 |
| (France) M Racing - YMR | Mercedes-AMG GT4 | 68 | (France) Alexandre Bardinon | Am | 2 |
| (France) M Racing - YMR | Mercedes-AMG GT4 | 85 | (France) Franck Leherpeur | Am | 1, 3–6 |
| (France) M Racing - YMR | Mercedes-AMG GT4 | 85 | (France) Tugdual Rabreau | Am | 3–6 |
| (France) Schatz-Lestienne Racing | Ginetta G55 GT4 | 71 | (France) Nicolas Schatz | PA | 3–4, 6 |
| (France) Schatz-Lestienne Racing | Ginetta G55 GT4 | 71 | (France) Alain Gaunot | PA | 3, 6 |
| (France) Schatz-Lestienne Racing | Ginetta G55 GT4 | 71 | (France) Jacques Wolff | PA | 4 |
| (France) Riviera Motorsport | Audi R8 LMS GT4 | 83 | (France) Julien Goujat | PA | 1 |
| (France) Riviera Motorsport | Audi R8 LMS GT4 | 83 | (France) Antoine Leclerc | PA | 1 |
| (France) AKKA-ASP Team | Mercedes-AMG GT4 | 87 | (France) Jean-Luc Beaubelique | PA | All |
| (France) AKKA-ASP Team | Mercedes-AMG GT4 | 87 | (France) Jim Pla | PA | All |
| (France) AKKA-ASP Team | Mercedes-AMG GT4 | 88 | (France) Thomas Drouet | PA | All |
| (France) AKKA-ASP Team | Mercedes-AMG GT4 | 88 | (France) Benjamin Ricci | PA | All |
| (France) AKKA-ASP Team | Mercedes-AMG GT4 | 89 | (France) Eric Clément | PA | 6 |
| (France) AKKA-ASP Team | Mercedes-AMG GT4 | 89 | (France) Morgan Moullin-Traffort | PA | 6 |
| (United Kingdom) Generation AMR Super Racing | Aston Martin Vantage GT4 | 144 | (United Kingdom) Matthew George | PA | 2, 4–6 |
| (United Kingdom) Generation AMR Super Racing | Aston Martin Vantage GT4 | 144 | (United Kingdom) James Holder | PA | 2, 5–6 |
| (United Kingdom) Generation AMR Super Racing | Aston Martin Vantage GT4 | 144 | (United Kingdom) James Appleby | PA | 4 |
| (United Kingdom) Greensall Motorsport | KTM X-Bow GT4 | 369 | (United Kingdom) Nigel Greensall | Am | 1, 3 |
| (United Kingdom) Greensall Motorsport | KTM X-Bow GT4 | 369 | (Turkey) Guner Turkmen | Am | 1, 3 |
| (France) FOXO | Porsche Cayman GT4 Clubsport MR | 982 | (France) Stéphane Brémard | Am | All |
| (France) FOXO | Porsche Cayman GT4 Clubsport MR | 982 | (France) Laurent Misbach | Am | 1, 3–6 |

| Icon | Class |
|---|---|
| PA | Pro-Am Cup |
| Am | Am Cup |

== Race results ==
Bold indicates overall winner.

| Round | | Circuit | Pole position | Pro-Am Winners | Am Winners |
|---|---|---|---|---|---|
| 1 | R1 | (France) Nogaro | (France) No. 42 Saintéloc Racing | **(France) No. 8 Speed Car** | (France) No. 25 AGS Events |
| 1 | R1 | (France) Nogaro | (France) Grégory Guilvert (France) Fabien Michal | **(France) Robert Consani** **(France) Benjamin Lariche** | (France) Nicolas Gomar (France) Julien Lambert |
| 1 | R2 | (France) Nogaro | (France) No. 26 CMR | **(France) No. 87 AKKA-ASP Team** | (France) No. 4 Speed Car |
| 1 | R2 | (France) Nogaro | (France) Soheil Ayari (France) Nicolas Tardif | **(France) Jean-Luc Beaubelique** **(France) Jim Pla** | (France) Rodolphe Wallgren |
| 2 | R1 | (France) Pau | (Spain) No. 1 CD Sport | **(Spain) No. 1 CD Sport** | (France) No. 4 Speed Car |
| 2 | R1 | (France) Pau | (France) Christophe Lapierre (France) Mike Parisy | **(France) Christophe Lapierre** **(France) Mike Parisy** | (France) Rodolphe Wallgren |
| 2 | R2 | (France) Pau | (Spain) No. 1 CD Sport | **(France) No. 8 Speed Car** | (France) No. 25 AGS Events |
| 2 | R2 | (France) Pau | (France) Christophe Lapierre (France) Mike Parisy | **(France) Robert Consani** **(France) Benjamin Lariche** | (France) Nicolas Gomar (France) Julien Lambert |
| 3 | R1 | (France) Dijon-Prenois | (France) No. 48 Orhès Racing | **(France) No. 71 Schatz-Lestienne Racing** | (France) No. 4 Speed Car |
| 3 | R1 | (France) Dijon-Prenois | (France) Philippe Marie (France) Olivier Pernaut | **(France) Alain Gaunot** **(France) Nicolas Schatz** | (France) Rodolphe Wallgren |
| 3 | R2 | (France) Dijon-Prenois | (France) No. 42 Saintéloc Racing | **(France) No. 87 AKKA-ASP Team** | (France) No. 34 GP34 by Gemo Motorsport |
| 3 | R2 | (France) Dijon-Prenois | (France) Grégory Guilvert (France) Fabien Michal | **(France) Jean-Luc Beaubelique** **(France) Jim Pla** | (France) Arnaud Gomez (France) Olivier Gomez |
| 4 | R1 | (France) Magny-Cours | (France) No. 42 Saintéloc Racing | **(France) No. 42 Saintéloc Racing** | (France) No. 4 Speed Car |
| 4 | R1 | (France) Magny-Cours | (France) Grégory Guilvert (France) Fabien Michal | **(France) Grégory Guilvert** **(France) Fabien Michal** | (France) Rodolphe Wallgren |
| 4 | R2 | (France) Magny-Cours | (France) No. 5 Saintéloc Racing | **(France) No. 36 CMR** | (United Arab Emirates) No. 50 3Y Technology |
| 4 | R2 | (France) Magny-Cours | (France) Christophe Hamon (France) Lonni Martins | **(France) Pierre-Alexandre Jean** **(France) Pierre Sancinéna** | (France) Romain Brandela (France) Michaël Petit |
| 5 | R1 | (Spain) Barcelona-Catalunya | (Spain) No. 15 NM Racing Team | **(France) No. 42 Saintéloc Racing** | (France) No. 4 Speed Car |
| 5 | R1 | (Spain) Barcelona-Catalunya | (Spain) Lluc Ibáñez (Spain) Xavier Lloveras | **(France) Grégory Guilvert** **(France) Fabien Michal** | (France) Rodolphe Wallgren |
| 5 | R2 | (Spain) Barcelona-Catalunya | (France) No. 87 AKKA-ASP Team | **(France) No. 42 Saintéloc Racing** | (France) No. 34 GP34 by Gemo Motorsport |
| 5 | R2 | (Spain) Barcelona-Catalunya | (France) Jean-Luc Beaubelique (France) Jim Pla | **(France) Grégory Guilvert** **(France) Fabien Michal** | (France) Arnaud Gomez (France) Olivier Gomez |
| 6 | R1 | (France) Paul Ricard | (France) No. 36 CMR | **No. 3 BMW Team France** | (France) No. 34 GP34 by Gemo Motorsport |
| 6 | R1 | (France) Paul Ricard | (France) Pierre-Alexandre Jean (France) Pierre Sancinéna | **(France) Laurent Hurgon** **(France) Julien Piguet** | (France) Arnaud Gomez (France) Olivier Gomez |
| 6 | R2 | (France) Paul Ricard | (United Kingdom) No. 144 Generation AMR Super Racing | **(France) No. 36 CMR** | (France) No. 34 GP34 by Gemo Motorsport |
| 6 | R2 | (France) Paul Ricard | (United Kingdom) Matthew George (United Kingdom) James Holder | **(France) Pierre-Alexandre Jean** **(France) Pierre Sancinéna** | (France) Arnaud Gomez (France) Olivier Gomez |

== Championship standings ==
Scoring system

Championship points were awarded for the first ten positions in each race. Entries were required to complete 75% of the winning car's race distance in order to be classified and earn points. Individual drivers were required to participate for a minimum of 25 minutes in order to earn championship points in any race.

| Position | **1st** | **2nd** | **3rd** | **4th** | **5th** | **6th** | **7th** | **8th** | **9th** | **10th** |
| Points | 25 | 18 | 15 | 12 | 10 | 8 | 6 | 4 | 2 | 1 |

=== Drivers' championship ===
| Pos. | Driver | Team | NOG (France) | | PAU (France) | | DIJ (France) | | MAG (France) | | CAT (Spain) | | LEC (France) | | Points |
Pro-Am class
| 1 | (France) Grégory Guilvert (France) Fabien Michal | (France) Saintéloc Racing | **10** | 4 | DNS | DNS | 2 | **3** | **1** | 2 | 1 | 1 | Ret | 6 | 149 |
| 2 | (France) Jean-Luc Beaubelique (France) Jim Pla | (France) AKKA-ASP Team | 2 | 1 | 8 | 18 | 4 | 1 | 14 | 14 | 5 | **2** | 6 | 2 | 139 |
| 3 | (France) Pierre-Alexandre Jean | (France) CMR | 4 | 3 | 15 | Ret | Ret | 5 | 3 | 1 | 4 | 11 | **2** | 1 | 136 |
| 4 | (France) Robert Consani (France) Benjamin Lariche | (France) Speed Car | 1 | 2 | 3 | 1 | 6 | 8 | 2 | 5 | Ret | 5 | Ret | 10 | 135 |
| 5 | (France) Olivier Jouffret (France) Eric Trémoulet | (France) Vic Team | 3 | 10 | 4 | Ret | Ret | 13 | 6 | 7 | 2 | 3 | 3 | 3 | 106 |
| 6 | (France) Pierre Sancinéna | (France) CMR | | | | | | | 3 | 1 | 4 | 11 | **2** | 1 | 99 |
| 7 | (France) Christophe Hamon (France) Lonni Martins | (France) Saintéloc Racing | Ret | 8 | 16 | 5 | 12 | 7 | 4 | **3** | 23 | 4 | 10 | 7 | 71 |
| 8 | (France) Laurent Hurgon (France) Julien Piguet | BMW Team France | 8 | 14 | 5 | 4 | 8 | Ret | 27 | Ret | 8 | 9 | 1 | Ret | 67 |
| 9 | (France) Pierre Courroye (Sweden) Douglas Lundberg | (France) Speed Car | 14 | 9 | 2 | 2 | Ret | 6 | 10 | 9 | Ret | 6 | Ret | 11 | 60 |
| 10 | (France) Thomas Drouet (France) Benjamin Ricci | (France) AKKA-ASP Team | 33 | 7 | 11 | 9 | 3 | 9 | Ret | 15 | 3 | 12 | 25 | 9 | 54 |
| 11 | (France) Christophe Lapierre (France) Mike Parisy | (Spain) CD Sport | 9 | 11 | **1** | **3** | 15 | 34 | 28 | 10 | 18 | Ret | 11 | 16 | 45 |
| 12 | (France) Nicolas Schatz | (France) Schatz-Lestienne Racing | | | | | 1 | 4 | 29 | 28 | | | 8 | Ret | 43 |
| 12 | (France) Alain Gaunot | (France) Schatz-Lestienne Racing | | | | | 1 | 4 | | | | | 8 | Ret | 43 |
| 13 | (Switzerland) Jimmy Antunes (France) Sylvain Noël | (France) Racing Technology | 19 | 15 | | | 5 | Ret | 8 | 4 | 32 | 13 | 4 | 41 | 39 |
| 14 | (France) Stéphane Tribaudini | (France) CMR | 4 | 3 | 15 | Ret | Ret | 5 | | | | | | | 37 |
| 14 | (France) Stéphane Tribaudini | (United Arab Emirates) 3Y Technology | | | | | | | | | | | Ret | 39 | 37 |
| 15 | (Netherlands) Ricardo van der Ende | (France) L'Espace Bienvenue | 7 | 12 | 13 | 7 | 17 | 12 | DNS | DNS | Ret | 30 | 5 | 4 | 36 |
| 16 | (France) Alexandre Bardinon | (France) M Racing - YMR | | | | | 7 | 2 | Ret | 8 | 13 | Ret | | | 29 |
| 17 | (France) Thomas Laurent | (France) M Racing - YMR | | | | | 7 | 2 | | | 13 | Ret | | | 25 |
| 18 | (France) Romain Monti | (United Arab Emirates) 3Y Technology | 11 | 22 | 7 | Ret | 9 | 10 | 11 | 6 | Ret | 31 | 38 | 8 | 23 |
| 19 | (France) Eric Debard | (France) L'Espace Bienvenue | | | | | | | DNS | DNS | Ret | 30 | 5 | 4 | 22 |
| 20 | (France) Soheil Ayari (France) Nicolas Tardif | (France) CMR | 5 | **37** | 22 | Ret | **35** | Ret | 5 | Ret | Ret | Ret | 39 | Ret | 20 |
| 21 | (France) Michael Blanchemain (France) Steven Palette | (France) IMSA Performance | 6 | 19 | 25 | Ret | 11 | 14 | 12 | 13 | 7 | Ret | 14 | 12 | 17 |
| 22 | (France) Yann Ehrlacher | (France) M Racing - YMR | 12 | 6 | | | | | Ret | 8 | | | 12 | 14 | 14 |
| 23 | (France) André Grammatico | (France) L'Espace Bienvenue | 7 | 12 | 13 | 7 | 17 | 12 | | | | | | | 14 |
| 24 | (United Kingdom) Matthew George | (United Kingdom) Generation AMR Super Racing | | | 20 | 14 | | | 7 | 34 | 31 | 33 | 9 | **27** | 12 |
| 25 | (France) Ronald Basso | (United Arab Emirates) 3Y Technology | 11 | 22 | | | 9 | 10 | 11 | 6 | Ret | 31 | | | 11 |
| 26 | (France) Laurent Millara | (France) M Racing - YMR | 12 | 6 | | | | | | | | | 12 | 14 | 10 |
| 27 | (France) Rémy Deguffroy | (Spain) CD Sport | 16 | 20 | 6 | Ret | 23 | 22 | 13 | 17 | | | | | 8 |
| 27 | (France) Valentin Simonet | (Spain) CD Sport | 16 | 20 | 6 | Ret | 23 | 22 | | | | | | | 8 |
| 27 | (France) Valentin Simonet | (France) K'Worx Racing | | | | | | | | | | | Ret | 23 | 8 |
| 28 | (France) Anthony Beltoise (France) Olivier Estèves | (France) Saintéloc Racing | 18 | 28 | 12 | 13 | Ret | DNS | 24 | 31 | 12 | 18 | 20 | 35 | 7 |
| 29 | (United Kingdom) James Appleby | (United Kingdom) Generation AMR Super Racing | | | | | | | 7 | 34 | | | | | 6 |
| 30 | (France) Éric Cayrolle | (United Arab Emirates) 3Y Technology | | | 7 | Ret | | | | | | | | | 6 |
| 31 | (United Kingdom) James Holder | (United Kingdom) Generation AMR Super Racing | | | 20 | 14 | | | | | 31 | 33 | 9 | **27** | 6 |
| 32 | (France) Thomas Hodier | (France) K'Worx Racing | | | | | | | 26 | 16 | 9 | 27 | Ret | 23 | 4 |
| 32 | (France) Nelson Lukes | (France) K'Worx Racing | | | | | | | 26 | 16 | 9 | 27 | | | 4 |
| 33 | (France) Gilles Vannelet | (United Arab Emirates) 3Y Technology | | | | | | | 9 | 21 | | | | | 2 |
| 33 | (France) Gilles Vannelet | (Spain) CD Sport | | | | | | | | | 14 | 16 | | | 2 |
| 33 | (France) Enzo Guibbert | (United Arab Emirates) 3Y Technology | | | | | | | 9 | 21 | | | | | 2 |
| | (France) Morgan Moullin-Traffort | (France) GM-Sport | 34 | 18 | | | | | | | | | | | 0 |
| | (France) Morgan Moullin-Traffort | (France) AKKA-ASP Team | | | | | | | | | | | 13 | 15 | 0 |
| | (French Guiana) Gavin Aimable | (Spain) CD Sport | | | | | | | 13 | 17 | | | | | 0 |
| | (France) Julien Goujat (France) Antoine Leclerc | (France) Riviera Motorsport | 13 | 23 | | | | | | | | | | | 0 |
| | (France) Simon Gachet (France) Bruno Hernandez | (France) Saintéloc Racing | | | | | 21 | 16 | | | | | | | 0 |
| | (France) Guillaume Maio | (France) GM-Sport | 34 | 18 | | | | | | | | | | | 0 |
| | (France) Christophe Carrière (Switzerland) Lucas Mauron | (France) AGS Events | 21 | 27 | | | | | | | | | | | 0 |
| | (France) Jacques Wolff | (France) Schatz-Lestienne Racing | | | | | | | 29 | 28 | | | | | 0 |
Guest drivers ineligible to score Pro-Am class points
| | (Spain) Lluc Ibáñez (Spain) Xavier Lloveras | (Spain) NM Racing Team | | | | | | | | | **6** | 10 | | | |
| | (India) Akhil Rabindra (Netherlands) Beitske Visser | (United Arab Emirates) 3Y Technology | | | | | | | | | 20 | 8 | | | |
| | (France) Romain Brandela | (United Arab Emirates) 3Y Technology | | | | | | | | | | | 38 | 8 | |
| | (France) Eric Clément | (France) AKKA-ASP Team | | | | | | | | | | | 13 | 15 | |
| | (France) Florian Latorre | (Spain) CD Sport | | | | | | | | | 14 | 16 | | | |
| | (France) Jean-Bernard Bouvet (France) Bruno Miot | (France) Zentech Sport | | | | | | | | | | | 16 | 18 | |
| | (Switzerland) Jonathan Hirschi (Switzerland) Pierre Hirschi | (France) TFT Racing | | | | | | | | | | | 18 | 24 | |
| | (France) Christian Bottemanne (France) Sacha Bottemanne | (France) Saintéloc Racing | | | | | | | | | | | 26 | 25 | |
| | (France) Sylvain Debs | (United Arab Emirates) 3Y Technology | | | | | | | | | | | Ret | 39 | |
Am class
| 1 | (France) Rodolphe Wallgren | (France) Speed Car | **Ret** | **5** | 9 | Ret | 10 | Ret | 15 | Ret | 10 | 15 | 15 | 19 | 170 |
| 2 | (France) Nicolas Gomar (France) Julien Lambert | (France) AGS Events | 15 | 13 | DSQ | 6 | 34 | 17 | **21** | 12 | 16 | 17 | 21 | 13 | 159 |
| 3 | (France) Arnaud Gomez (France) Olivier Gomez | (France) GP34 by Gemo Motorsport | 20 | 25 | | | Ret | 11 | | | 11 | 7 | **7** | 5 | 139 |
| 4 | (France) Clément Dub (France) Laurent Dub | (Switzerland) Cool Racing | 22 | 17 | 19 | **8** | 18 | **31** | 18 | 19 | 30 | 19 | 17 | 17 | 124 |
| 5 | (France) Stéphane Brémard | (France) FOXO | Ret | 21 | 10 | 15 | 16 | 19 | 17 | 20 | 17 | 21 | 19 | 29 | 113 |
| 6 | (France) Laurent Misbach | (France) FOXO | Ret | 21 | | | 16 | 19 | 17 | 20 | 17 | 21 | 19 | 29 | 87 |
| 7 | (France) Philippe Marie (France) Olivier Pernaut | (France) Orhès Racing | 24 | 29 | 26 | 16 | **19** | 23 | 22 | **Ret** | **15** | 14 | 29 | 22 | 74 |
| 8 | (France) Alain Grand (France) Didier Moureu | (United Arab Emirates) 3Y Technology | 32 | 33 | 23 | 17 | 29 | 18 | 16 | 25 | 26 | 29 | 24 | 30 | 45 |
| 9 | (France) Pascal Huteau | (France) Racing Technology | 17 | 16 | | | 27 | 26 | Ret | 30 | 29 | Ret | 37 | 21 | 43 |
| 10 | (France) Christopher Cappello | (France) CMR | | | | | 25 | 15 | 19 | 33 | 21 | **24** | Ret | **28** | 40 |
| 11 | (France) Elie Dubelly (France) Laurent Fresnais | BMW Team France | 23 | 32 | DNS | DNS | 14 | 20 | Ret | 29 | 22 | 23 | Ret | 42 | 39 |
| 12 | (France) Eric Herr (France) Lauris Nauroy | (France) AGS Events | 25 | Ret | 14 | 12 | 33 | 25 | 31 | 23 | Ret | Ret | 34 | 37 | 38 |
| 13 | (France) Guillaume Maio | (France) GM-Sport | | | | | 20 | 32 | | | | | 22 | 26 | 36 |
| 13 | (France) Guillaume Maio | (France) GP34 by Gemo Motorsport | | | | | | | 20 | 22 | | | | | 36 |
| 14 | (France) Franck Leherpeur | (France) M Racing - YMR | Ret | 31 | | | 13 | 27 | 25 | 18 | Ret | 32 | 28 | 33 | 35 |
| 14 | (France) Tugdual Rabreau | (France) M Racing - YMR | | | | | 13 | 27 | 25 | 18 | Ret | 32 | 28 | 33 | 35 |
| 15 | (France) Arnaud Noël | (France) Racing Technology | 17 | 16 | | | | | | | | | | | 33 |
| 16 | (France) Wilfried Cazalbon | (France) CMR | 26 | 26 | 18 | Ret | 26 | 33 | 23 | Ret | 19 | 22 | 31 | 36 | 32 |
| 17 | (Andorra) Manel Cerqueda (Spain) Daniel Díaz-Varela | (Spain) Baporo Motorsport | 31 | 24 | 21 | DNS | 28 | 30 | Ret | 27 | 24 | 20 | 23 | 34 | 30 |
| 18 | (France) Romain Brandela | (United Arab Emirates) 3Y Technology | | | 24 | Ret | 30 | 24 | Ret | 11 | | | | | 29 |
| 19 | (France) Michaël Petit | (United Arab Emirates) 3Y Technology | | | | | | | Ret | 11 | | | | | 25 |
| 20 | (France) Alexandre Guesdon | (France) GM-Sport | | | | | 20 | 32 | | | | | | | 22 |
| 20 | (France) Alexandre Guesdon | (France) GP34 by Gemo Motorsport | | | | | | | 20 | 22 | | | | | 22 |
| 21 | (France) Georges Cabanne | (France) CMR | | | | | | | 19 | 33 | 21 | **24** | Ret | **28** | 21 |
| 22 | (France) Jérémy Reymond | (France) CMR | 26 | 26 | 18 | Ret | | | 23 | Ret | | | | | 20 |
| 23 | (France) Alexis Berthet | (France) CMR | | | | | 25 | 15 | | | | | | | 19 |
| 24 | (France) Cyril Saleilles | (Switzerland) Cool Racing | 29 | 30 | **Ret** | 10 | 24 | 29 | 30 | 32 | 27 | 26 | 30 | 31 | 18 |
| 25 | (France) Christophe Carrière | (France) AGS Events | | | 17 | Ret | | | 33 | 26 | 25 | 28 | 27 | Ret | 16 |
| 26 | (France) Manu Damiani | (France) AGS Events | | | 17 | Ret | | | | | | | | | 12 |
| 27 | (France) Alexandre Bardinon | (France) M Racing - YMR | | | DNS | 11 | | | | | | | | | 12 |
| 28 | (France) Franck Quesada (France) Sébastien Quesada | (France) CMR | | | | | 32 | 21 | 32 | 24 | | | | | 10 |
| 29 | (United Kingdom) Nigel Greensall (Turkey) Guner Turkmen | (United Kingdom) Greensall Motorsport | 28 | 35 | | | 22 | DSQ | | | | | | | 5 |
| 30 | (France) Christian Philippon | (United Arab Emirates) 3Y Technology | 27 | 34 | 24 | Ret | | | | | | | 35 | 32 | 4 |
| 31 | (France) Didier Dumaine | (France) AGS Events | | | | | | | 33 | 26 | 25 | 28 | 27 | Ret | 4 |
| 32 | (France) Sébastien Pineau | (United Arab Emirates) 3Y Technology | | | | | 30 | 24 | | | | | | | 2 |
| 32 | (France) Franck Labescat | (United Arab Emirates) 3Y Technology | 27 | 34 | | | | | | | | | | | 2 |
| | (France) Jean-Luc Deblangey | (France) Racing Technology | | | | | 27 | 26 | | | | | | | 0 |
| | (France) Louis Rousset | (France) CMR | | | | | 26 | 33 | | | | | | | 0 |
| | (France) Bernard Salam (France) Olivier Salam | (France) SDA Sport / TFT Racing | 30 | 36 | | | 31 | 28 | | | | | | | 0 |
| | (France) Christian Blugeon | (France) Racing Technology | | | | | | | Ret | 30 | | | | | 0 |
| | (France) Jean-Claude Lagniez (Portugal) Carlos Sarrea | BMW Team France | WD | WD | | | | | | | | | | | |
Guest drivers ineligible to score Am class points
| | (French Guiana) Gavin Aimable | (Spain) CD Sport | | | | | | | | | | | 32 | 20 | |
| | (France) Jérôme Boullery | (France) Racing Technology | | | | | | | | | | | 37 | 21 | |
| | (France) Gilles Vannelet | (France) GM-Sport | | | | | | | | | | | 22 | 26 | |
| | (France) Michel Ghio (France) Éric Martin | (France) K'Worx Racing | | | | | | | | | 28 | 25 | 33 | 38 | |
| | (France) Thomas Nicolle | (France) CMR | | | | | | | | | | | 31 | 36 | |
| | (France) Jean-Paul Buffin | (United Arab Emirates) 3Y Technology | | | | | | | | | | | 35 | 32 | |
| | (France) Denis Papin | (France) Racing Technology | | | | | | | | | 29 | Ret | | | |
| | (France) Benjamin Cormoreche (France) Didier Cormoreche | (France) CMR | | | | | | | | | | | 36 | 40 | |
| | (Germany) Christian Danner (Germany) Bernhard Laber | (Germany) Team GT | | | | | | | | | | | Ret | Ret | |
| Pos. | Driver | Team | NOG (France) | | PAU (France) | | DIJ (France) | | MAG (France) | | CAT (Spain) | | LEC (France) | | Points |

Key
| Colour | Result |
|---|---|
| Gold | Race winner |
| Silver | 2nd place |
| Bronze | 3rd place |
| Green | Points finish |
| Blue | Non-points finish |
| Blue | Non-classified finish (NC) |
| Purple | Did not finish (Ret) |
| Black | Disqualified (DSQ) |
| Black | Excluded (EX) |
| White | Did not start (DNS) |
| White | Race cancelled (C) |
| White | Withdrew (WD) |
| Blank | Did not participate |

**Bold** – Pole
Italics – Fastest Lap

=== Teams' championship ===
| Pos. | Team | Manufacturer | NOG (France) | | PAU (France) | | DIJ (France) | | MAG (France) | | CAT (Spain) | | LEC (France) | | Points |
Pro-Am class
| 1 | (France) Saintéloc Racing | Audi | **10** | 4 | 16 | 5 | 2 | **3** | **1** | **2** | 1 | 1 | 10 | 6 | 170 |
| 2 | (France) AKKA-ASP Team | Mercedes-AMG | 2 | 1 | 8 | 18 | 3 | 1 | 14 | 14 | 3 | **2** | 6 | 2 | 160 |
| 3 | (France) Speed Car | Ginetta | 1 | 2 | 2 | 1 | 6 | 6 | 2 | 5 | Ret | 5 | Ret | 10 | 152 |
| 4 | (France) CMR | Alpine; Ginetta | 4 | **3** | 15 | Ret | **35** | 5 | 3 | 1 | 4 | 11 | **2** | 1 | 140 |
| 5 | (France) Vic Team | Porsche | 3 | 10 | 4 | Ret | Ret | 13 | 6 | 7 | 2 | 3 | 3 | 3 | 123 |
| 6 | BMW Team France | BMW | 8 | 14 | 5 | 4 | 8 | Ret | 27 | Ret | 8 | 9 | 1 | Ret | 82 |
| 7 | (Spain) CD Sport | Porsche | 9 | 11 | **1** | **3** | 15 | 22 | 13 | 10 | 14 | 16 | 11 | 16 | 66 |
| 8 | (United Arab Emirates) 3Y Technology | BMW | 11 | 22 | 7 | Ret | 9 | 10 | 9 | 6 | 20 | 8 | 38 | 8 | 56 |
| 9 | (France) Racing Technology | Porsche | 19 | 15 | | | 5 | Ret | 8 | 4 | 32 | 13 | 4 | 41 | 52 |
| 10 | (France) L'Espace Bienvenue | BMW | 7 | 12 | 13 | 7 | 17 | 12 | DNS | DNS | Ret | 30 | 5 | 4 | 52 |
| 11 | (France) M Racing - YMR | Mercedes-AMG | 12 | 6 | | | 7 | 2 | Ret | 8 | 13 | Ret | 12 | 14 | 48 |
| 12 | (France) Schatz-Lestienne Racing | Ginetta | | | | | 1 | 4 | 29 | 28 | | | 8 | Ret | 43 |
| 13 | (France) IMSA Performance | Porsche | 6 | 19 | 25 | Ret | 11 | 14 | 12 | 13 | 7 | Ret | 14 | 12 | 33 |
| 14 | (United Kingdom) Generation AMR Super Racing | Aston Martin | | | 20 | 14 | | | 7 | 34 | 31 | 33 | 9 | **27** | 21 |
| 15 | (France) K'Worx Racing | Ginetta | | | | | | | 26 | 16 | 9 | 27 | Ret | 23 | 7 |
| | (France) Riviera Motorsport | Audi | 13 | 23 | | | | | | | | | | | 0 |
| | (France) GM-Sport | Ginetta | 34 | 18 | | | | | | | | | | | 0 |
| | (France) AGS Events | Porsche | 21 | 27 | | | | | | | | | | | 0 |
Guest teams ineligible to score Pro-Am class points
| | (Spain) NM Racing Team | Ginetta | | | | | | | | | **6** | 10 | | | |
| | (France) Zentech Sport | Alpine | | | | | | | | | | | 16 | 18 | |
| | (France) TFT Racing | Porsche | | | | | | | | | | | 18 | 24 | |
Am class
| 1 | (France) AGS Events | Porsche | 15 | 13 | 14 | 6 | 34 | 17 | **21** | 12 | 16 | 17 | 21 | 13 | 174 |
| 2 | (France) Speed Car | Ginetta | **Ret** | **5** | 9 | Ret | 10 | Ret | 15 | Ret | 10 | 15 | 15 | 19 | 170 |
| 3 | (France) GP34 by Gemo Motorsport | Ginetta; Maserati | 20 | 25 | | | Ret | 11 | 20 | 22 | 11 | 7 | **7** | 5 | 155 |
| 4 | (Switzerland) Cool Racing | Porsche | 22 | 17 | **19** | **8** | 18 | **29** | 18 | 19 | 27 | 19 | 17 | 17 | 127 |
| 5 | (France) FOXO | Porsche | Ret | 21 | 10 | 15 | 16 | 19 | 17 | 20 | 17 | 21 | 19 | 29 | 117 |
| 6 | (France) Orhès Racing | Audi | 24 | 29 | 26 | 16 | **19** | 23 | 22 | **Ret** | **15** | 14 | 29 | 22 | 84 |
| 7 | (United Arab Emirates) 3Y Technology | BMW | 27 | 33 | 23 | 17 | 29 | 18 | 16 | 11 | 26 | 29 | 24 | 30 | 81 |
| 8 | (France) CMR | Ginetta | 26 | 26 | 18 | Ret | 25 | 15 | 19 | 24 | 19 | **22** | 31 | **28** | 74 |
| 9 | (France) M Racing - YMR | Mercedes-AMG | Ret | 31 | DNS | 11 | 13 | 27 | 25 | 18 | Ret | 32 | 28 | 33 | 55 |
| 10 | (France) Racing Technology | Porsche | 17 | 16 | | | 27 | 26 | Ret | 30 | 29 | Ret | 37 | 21 | 49 |
| 11 | BMW Team France | BMW | 23 | 32 | DNS | DNS | 14 | 20 | Ret | 29 | 22 | 23 | Ret | 42 | 43 |
| 12 | (Spain) Baporo Motorsport | Audi | 31 | 24 | 21 | DNS | 28 | 30 | Ret | 27 | 24 | 20 | 23 | 34 | 38 |
| 13 | (France) GM-Sport | Ginetta | | | | | 20 | 32 | | | | | 22 | 26 | 20 |
| 14 | (United Kingdom) Greensall Motorsport | KTM | 28 | 35 | | | 22 | DSQ | | | | | | | 6 |
| 15 | (France) SDA Sport / TFT Racing | BMW | 30 | 36 | | | 31 | 28 | | | | | | | 2 |
Guest teams ineligible to score Am class points
| | (Spain) CD Sport | Porsche | | | | | | | | | | | 32 | 20 | |
| | (France) K'Worx Racing | Ginetta | | | | | | | | | 28 | 25 | 33 | 38 | |
| | (Germany) Team GT | McLaren | | | | | | | | | | | Ret | Ret | |
| Pos. | Team | Manufacturer | NOG (France) | | PAU (France) | | DIJ (France) | | MAG (France) | | CAT (Spain) | | LEC (France) | | Points |

== See also ==
- 2018 GT4 European Series
- 2018 GT4 Central European Cup
