= Steven Palette =

French racing driver (born 1990)

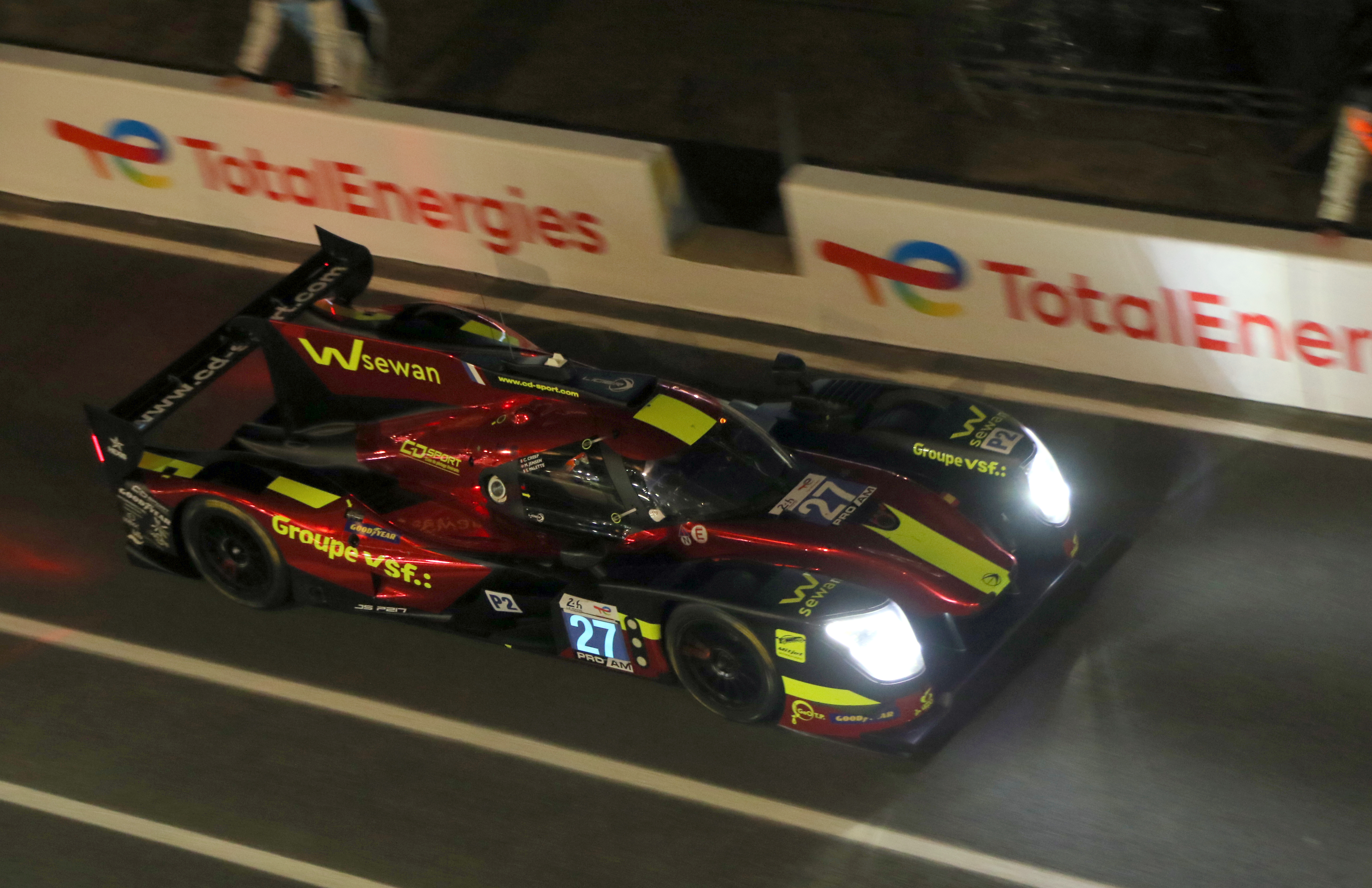
- Palette in 2022
- Nationality: (France) French
- Born: Steven Alain Palette; 1 December 1989 (age 36) Saint-Doulchard, France
- Categorisation: FIA Silver

Championship titles
- 2022 2020 2013 2009: Asian Le Mans Series – LMP3; GT World Challenge Europe Sprint Cup – Silver; Peugeot RCZ Racing Cup France; Peugeot 207 THP Cup

Steven Alain Palette (born 1 December 1989) is a French racing driver who last competed for RedAnt Racing in the 24H Series Middle East.

He is a champion at GT3 and LMP3 level, having won the GT World Challenge Europe Sprint Cup Silver Cup in 2020 and the Asian Le Mans Series in 2022.

== Career ==
Palette began his racing career in 2007, competing in the Peugeot one-make competitions in France, most notably winning the 207 THP Cup in 2009, as well as racing part-time in the THP Spider Cup the same year. Following a season in the French Renault Clio Cup, Palette finished fifth in the Elite standings of the 2011 Racecar Euro Series, before switching to Peugeot RCZ Racing Cup France in 2012, finishing runner-up in points, as well as winning the 24 Hours of Nürburgring in the SP2T class the same year.

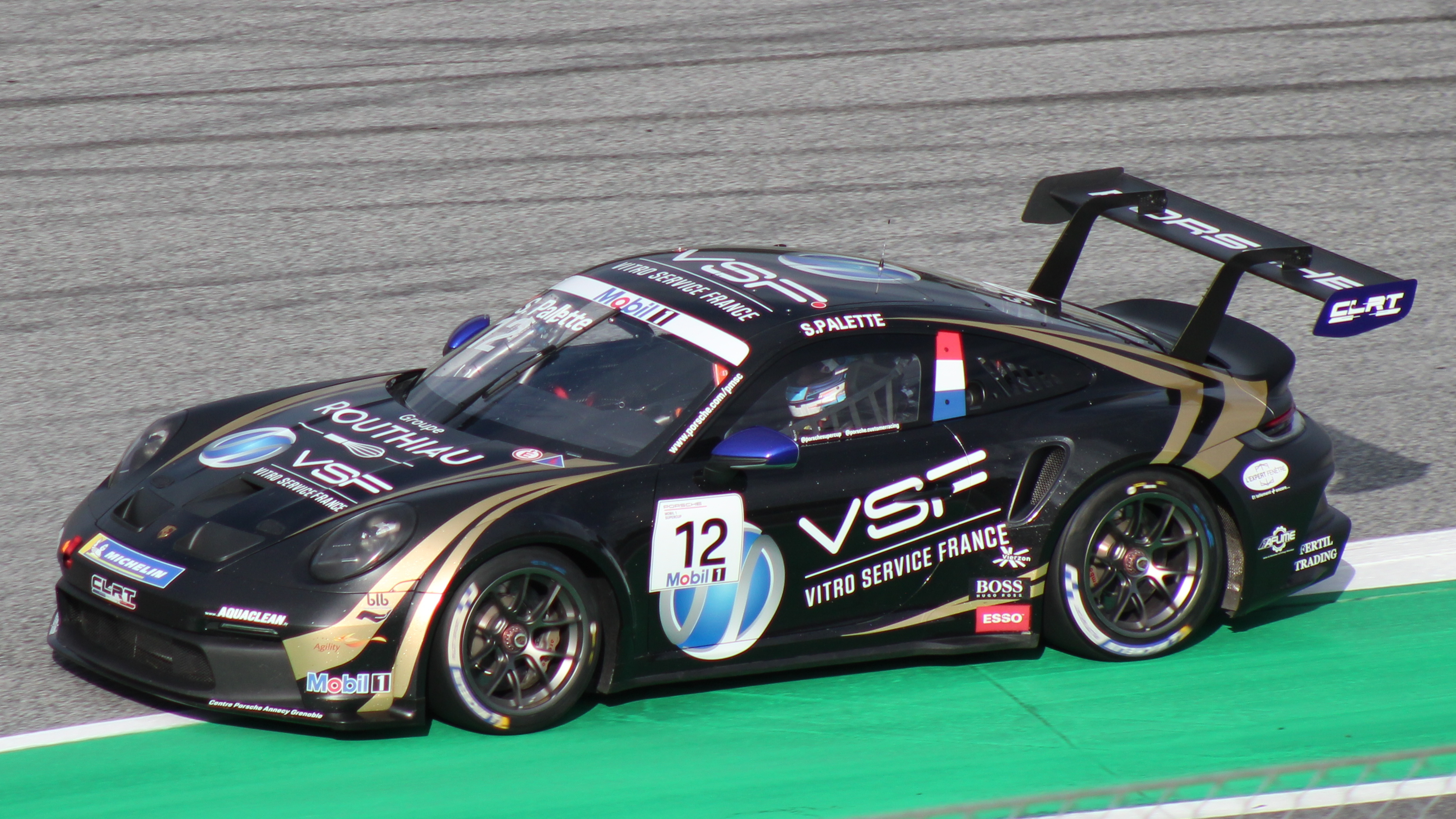
Palette during his second Porsche Supercup stint, at the Red Bull Ring in 2021.

Remaining in Peugeot RCZ Racing Cup France for 2013, Palette won all but one of the ten races he started to secure the title. In parallel, Palette raced for Team Lompech Sport in the Eurocup Mégane Trophy, taking a lone podium at the Red Bull Ring and ending the year eighth in the overall standings. In 2014, Palette joined Yvan Muller Racing to transition to Porsche Carrera Cup France, amassing two podiums to end the season eighth in points. Switching to Martinet by Alméras for his second season in the series the following year, he took wins at Lédenon and Le Castellet en route to a third-place points finish. Two seasons in Porsche Supercup then ensued, in which Palette scored a best result of eighth at the Red Bull Ring in 2016, a year in which he came ninth in the overall standings. During 2017, Palette also made his debut in GT4 competition with the same team, competing in the GT4 European Series Southern Cup, scoring a lone win at Dijon as he finished the year fourth in Pro-Am.

A second season in the French GT4 Cup with IMSA Performance then followed, before finishing fifth in the Pro-Am class of the GT4 International Cup for Saintéloc Junior Team at the end of the year. In 2019, Palette made his debut in GT3 competition with Saintéloc, racing an Audi R8 LMS Evo in both the Blancpain GT Series Endurance Cup and Blancpain GT World Challenge Europe. After scoring three combined points finishes across both campaigns, Palette returned to the team for 2020 to race in the GT World Challenge Europe Sprint Cup. In his second full-time season in the series, Palette scored an outright win at Magny-Cours, two further class wins at Misano and three other podiums to clinch the Silver Cup title alongside Simon Gachet.

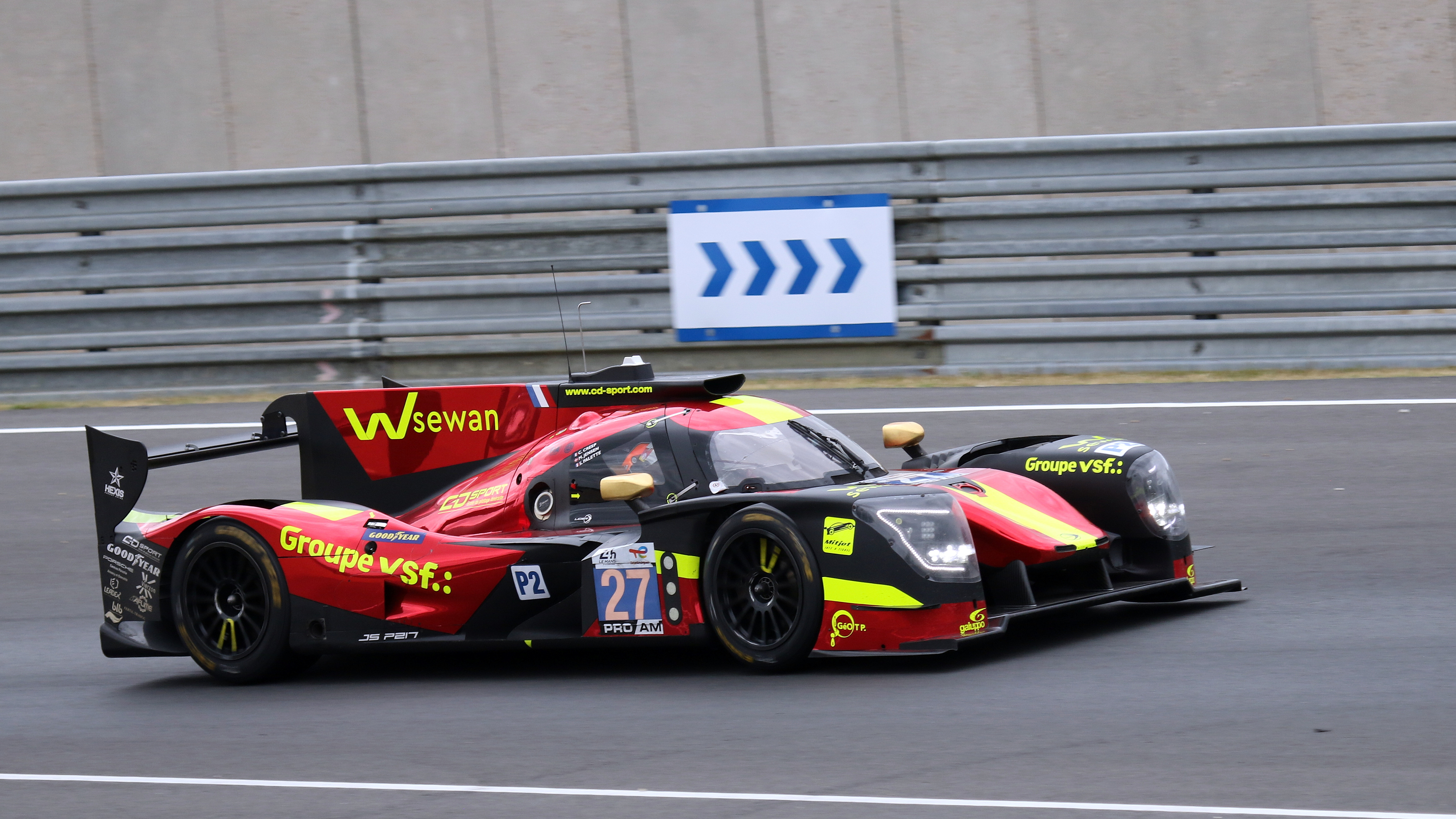
Palette's LMP3 title led to an unlikely LMP2 debut for CD Sport at the 2022 24 Hours of Le Mans.

Following that, Palette briefly returned to Porsche one-make competition in 2021 with CLRT, before joining CD Sport to compete in the LMP3 class of the 2022 Asian Le Mans Series. In his only season in the series, Palette finished on the podium in all four races, including three second-place finishes, to secure the class title and an invitation to that year's 24 Hours of Le Mans, in which he raced in the LMP2 Pro-Am subclass for the same team. The following year, Palette returned to GT3 competition and Porsche-affiliated CLRT for a dual campaign in the Bronze Cup of the GT World Challenge Europe Endurance and Sprint Cups. Between the two series, Palette found more success in the former, taking a class podium at Barcelona as he concluded the season 15th in points. A full season in the Sprint Cup for the same team then followed in 2024, where he secured a lone podium at Magny-Cours. During 2024, Palette also raced at the 24 Hours of Spa for Audi-fielding CSA Racing.

In 2025, Palette primarily raced in the JS2 R class of the Ligier European Series for VSF Sports, scoring three wins and finishing on the podium in all six races he started en route to a fourth-place points finish. Also in 2025, Palette finished third in the SP9 Pro-Am class of the 24 Hours of Nürburgring for Aston Martin–aligned PROsport Racing, and third in GT3 Pro-Am at the Gulf 12 Hours for Audi-fielding HAAS RT. At the beginning of the following year, Palette raced at the Dubai 24 Hour for RedAnt Racing, which he won in the 992 Am class. During 2026, Palette also raced at the 24 Hours of Spa for HAAS RT.

== Racing record ==
=== Racing career summary ===
Season	Series	Team	Races	Wins	Poles	F/Laps	Podiums	Points	Position
2008	Peugeot Endurance 207 THP								
2009	Peugeot 207 THP Cup								**1st**
2009	Peugeot THP Spider Cup		4	0	0	0	1	66	7th
2010	French Renault Clio Cup Elf	Pole Position 81	10	0	0	1	1	119	14th
2011	Racecar Euro Series – Elite	Hélary Racing Team	12	0	0	0	6	460	5th
2012	Peugeot RCZ Racing Cup France	Trajecontrol	12	4	2	2	8	166	**2nd**
2012	V de V Challenge Endurance Moderne – Proto	JMP Racing	1	0	0	0	0	0	NC
2012	24 Hours of Nürburgring – SP2T		1	1	0	0	1	—N/a	**1st**
2013	Peugeot RCZ Racing Cup France	Team Clairet Sport	10	9	9	7	9	202	**1st**
2013	Eurocup Mégane Trophy	Team Lompech Sport	11	0	0	1	1	68	8th
2014	Porsche Carrera Cup France	Yvan Muller Racing	13	0	0	0	2	95	8th
2015	24H Series – A3T	Team Altran	1	1	0	0	1	0	NC
2015	Porsche Carrera Cup France	Martinet By Alméras	12	2	1	1	5	170	**3rd**
2015	Porsche Carrera Cup Italy	Martinet By Alméras	1	1	0	1	1	0	NC†
2015	V de V Endurance Series – GTV2	Porsche Alméras	1	0	0	0	0	7	32nd
2016	Porsche Supercup	Martinet By Alméras	10	0	0	0	0	57	9th
2016	V de V Endurance Series – GTV2	Martinet By Alméras	1	0	0	0	0	0	NC
2016	24H Series – CUP1	Sorg Rennsport	1	0	0	0	0	0	NC
2017	GT4 European Series Southern Cup – Pro-Am	Martinet By Alméras	12	1	0	0	3	99	4th
2017	Porsche Supercup	Martinet By Alméras	9	0	0	0	0	26	15th
2017	V de V Endurance Series – GTV2	Porsche Alméras	1	0	0	0	0	27	21st
2018	French GT4 Cup – Pro-Am	IMSA Performance	12	0	0	0	0	17	21st
2018	GT4 International Cup – Pro-Am	Saintéloc Junior Team	1	0	0	0	0	—N/a	5th
2019	Blancpain GT Series Endurance Cup	Saintéloc Racing	4	0	0	0	0	2	33rd
2019	Blancpain GT Series Endurance Cup – Pro-Am	Saintéloc Racing	1	0	0	0	0	8	22nd
2019	Blancpain GT World Challenge Europe	Saintéloc Racing	9	0	0	0	0	3	22nd
2019	French GT4 Cup – Pro-Am	IMSA Performance	12	1	0	0	1	46	13th
2019	VLN Series – V4	Team AVIA Sorg Rennsport	1	0	0	0	0	0	NC
2019	ADAC GT Masters	BWT Mücke Motorsport	2	0	0	0	0	0	NC
2020	24H GT Series Continents – GT3	Saintéloc Racing	1	0	0	0	0	6	NC
2020	GT World Challenge Europe Sprint Cup	Saintéloc Racing	10	1	1	0	2	33.5	9th
2020	GT World Challenge Europe Sprint Cup – Silver	Saintéloc Racing	10	3	3	2	6	108.5	**1st**
2020	GT World Challenge Europe Endurance Cup	Saintéloc Racing	1	0	0	0	0	0	NC
2020	GT World Challenge Europe Endurance Cup – Am	Saintéloc Racing	1	0	0	1	0	12	13th
2021	Porsche Supercup	CLRT	5	0	0	0	0	17	16th
2021	Porsche Carrera Cup France	CLRT	2	0	0	0	0	0	NC†
2022	Asian Le Mans Series – LMP3	CD Sport	4	0	0	0	4	69	**1st**
2022	24 Hours of Le Mans – LMP2 Pro-Am	CD Sport	1	0	0	0	0	—N/a	9th
2022–23	Middle East Trophy – 992 Am	Speed Lover	1	0	0	0	0	14	NC
2023	GT World Challenge Europe Endurance Cup	CLRT	5	0	0	0	0	0	NC
2023	GT World Challenge Europe Endurance Cup – Bronze	CLRT	5	0	0	0	1	40	8th
2023	GT World Challenge Europe Sprint Cup	CLRT	6	0	0	0	0	0	NC
2023	GT World Challenge Europe Sprint Cup – Bronze	CLRT	6	0	0	0	0	6.5	14th
2023	French GT4 Cup – Pro-Am	VSF Sports	3	0	0	0	1	34	11th
2023–24	Middle East Trophy – 992 Am	PROsport Racing	1	0	0	0	0	14	NC
2024	Nürburgring Langstrecken-Serie – SP10	PROsport Racing	1	0	0	0	0	0	NC
2024	GT World Challenge Europe Sprint Cup	Schumacher CLRT	8	0	0	0	0	0	NC
2024	GT World Challenge Europe Sprint Cup – Bronze	Schumacher CLRT	8	0	0	0	1	22	8th
2024	Ultimate Cup Series GT Endurance Cup – Porsche Cup	GP Racing Team	1	0	1	1	1	15	14th
2024	GT World Challenge Europe Endurance Cup	CSA Racing	1	0	0	0	0	0	NC
2024	GT World Challenge Europe Endurance Cup – Gold	CSA Racing	1	0	0	0	0	8	17th
2024	Ligier European Series – JS2 R	LADC Motorsport	1	0	0	1	1	0	NC†
2025	Nürburgring Langstrecken-Serie – SP9 Pro-Am	PROsport Racing	1	0	0	0	0	0	NC
2025	24 Hours of Nürburgring – SP9 Pro-Am	PROsport Racing	1	0	0	0	1	—N/a	**2nd**
2025	Ultimate Cup European Series GT Endurance Cup – Porsche Cup	GP Racing Team	1	0	0	0	0	0	NC
2025	Ligier European Series – JS2 R	VSF Sports	6	3	3	4	6	129	4th
2025	GT World Challenge Europe Endurance Cup – Pro-Am	HAAS RT	1	0	0	0	0	0	NC
2025	Gulf 12 Hours – GT3 Pro-Am	HAAS RT	1	0	0	0	1	—N/a	**3rd**
2025	992 Endurance Cup – Am-Silver	RedAnt Racing	1	0	0	0	0	—N/a	5th
2025–26	24H Series Middle East – 992 Am	RedAnt Racing	1	1	0	0	1	60	NC
2026	24H Series – GT3	HAAS RT	2	0	0	0	1	44	25th
2026	GT World Challenge Europe Endurance Cup – Pro-Am	HAAS RT	1	0	0	0	0	0	NC
2026	Nürburgring Langstrecken-Serie – SP9 Pro-Am	PROsport Racing Team Bilstein	2	0	0	0	1	8	NC

^{†} As Palette was a guest driver, he was ineligible to score points.

=== Complete Eurocup Mégane Trophy results ===
(key) (Races in bold indicate pole position) (Races in italics indicate fastest lap)

Year	Entrant	1	2	3	4	5	6	7	8	9	10	11	12	13	14	15	DC	Points
2013	Team Lompech Sport	ARA; 1 Ret	ARA; 2 Ret	SPA; 1; 5	SPA; 2 Ret	MSC; 1; 6	MSC; 2; 5	RBR; 1; 2	RBR; 2; 11	HUN; 1; 4	HUN; 2; 6	LEC; 1; 16	LEC; 2 C	CAT; 1	CAT; 2	CAT; 3	8th	68

=== Complete Porsche Supercup results ===
(key) (Races in bold indicate pole position) (Races in italics indicate fastest lap)

Year	Team	1	2	3	4	5	6	7	8	9	10	11	Pos.	Pts
2016	Martinet by Alméras	CAT; 21†	MON; 9	RBR; 5	SIL; 18	HUN; 13	HOC; 7	SPA; 21	MNZ; 14	COA; 9	COA; 12		9th	57
2017	Martinet by Alméras	CAT; 14	CAT; 10	MON; 9	RBR; 9	SIL; 16	HUN; 17	SPA; 18	SPA; DSQ	MNZ; 18	MEX	MEX	15th	26
2021	CLRT	MON; 10	RBR; 22	RBR; 14	HUN	SPA; 11	ZND; 23	MNZ	MNZ				16th	17

=== Complete GT World Challenge Europe results ===
==== GT World Challenge Europe Endurance Cup ====
(key) (Races in bold indicate pole position) (Races in italics indicate fastest lap)

Year	Team	Car	Class	1	2	3	4	5	6	7	Pos.	Points
2019	Saintéloc Racing	Audi R8 LMS Evo	Pro	MNZ; 15	SIL; 11	LEC; 9					33rd	2
2019	Saintéloc Racing	Audi R8 LMS Evo	Pro-Am				SPA; 6H; 62	SPA; 12H; 56	SPA; 24H; 48	CAT	22nd	8
2020	Saintéloc Racing	Audi R8 LMS Evo	Am	IMO	NÜR	SPA; 6H; 47	SPA; 12H; 51	SPA; 24H; Ret	LEC		13th	12
2023	CLRT	Porsche 911 GT3 R (992)	Bronze	MNZ; 24	LEC; 41†	SPA; 6H; 38	SPA; 12H; 30	SPA; 24H; 20	NÜR; 33	CAT; 24	15th	19
2024	CSA Racing	Audi R8 LMS Evo II	Gold	LEC	SPA; 6H; 51	SPA; 12H; 54†	SPA; 24H; Ret	NÜR	MNZ	JED	17th	8
2025	HAAS RT	Audi R8 LMS Evo II	Pro-Am	LEC	MNZ	SPA; 6H; 36	SPA; 12H; 45	SPA; 24H; 44	NÜR	CAT	NC	0
2026	HAAS RT	Audi R8 LMS Evo II	Pro-Am	LEC	MNZ	SPA; 6H; 64†	SPA; 12H; 64†	SPA; 24H; Ret	NÜR	ALG	NC	0

==== GT World Challenge Europe Sprint Cup ====
Year	Team	Car	Class	1	2	3	4	5	6	7	8	9	10	Pos.	Points
2019	Saintéloc Racing	Audi R8 LMS	Pro	BRH; 1 Ret	BRH; 2 Ret	MIS; 1 Ret	MIS; 2 Ret	ZAN; 1 Ret	ZAN; 2 DNS	NÜR; 1; 18	NÜR; 2; 7	HUN; 1; 19	HUN; 2; 12	22nd	3
2020	Saintéloc Racing	Audi R8 LMS Evo	Silver	MIS; 1; 9	**MIS**; **2**; 9	MIS; 3; 14	**MAG**; **1**; 13	**MAG**; **2**; 1	ZAN; 1; 3	ZAN; 2 Ret	CAT; 1; 19	CAT; 2; 9	CAT; 3; 7	1st	108.5
2023	CLRT	Porsche 911 GT3 R (992)	Bronze	MIS; 1; 32	MIS; 2; 36†	HOC; 1; 28	HOC; 2 Ret	VAL; 1; 33	VAL; 2 Ret					14th	6.5
2024	Schumacher CLRT	Porsche 911 GT3 R (992)	Bronze	MIS; 1; 29	MIS; 2 Ret	HOC; 1; 26	HOC; 2; 24	MAG; 1; 31†	MAG; 2; 21	CAT; 1; 25	CAT; 2; 26			8th	22

=== Complete Asian Le Mans Series results ===
(key) (Races in bold indicate pole position) (Races in italics indicate fastest lap)

Year	Team	Class	Car	Engine	1	2	3	4	Pos.	Points
2022	CD Sport	LMP3	Ligier JS P320	Nissan VK50VE 5.0 L V8	DUB; 1; 2	DUB; 2; 2	ABU; 1; 3	ABU; 2; 2	1st	69

=== Complete 24 Hours of Le Mans results ===
Year	Team	Co-Drivers	Car	Class	Laps	Pos.	Class Pos.
2022	(Spain) CD Sport	(France) Christophe Cresp (Denmark) Michael Jensen	Ligier JS P217-Gibson	LMP2	333	49th	25th
2022	(Spain) CD Sport	(France) Christophe Cresp (Denmark) Michael Jensen	Ligier JS P217-Gibson	LMP2 Pro-Am	333	49th	9th

=== Complete Ligier European Series results ===
(key) (Races in bold indicate pole position; results in italics indicate fastest lap)

Year	Entrant	Class	Chassis	1	2	3	4	5	6	7	8	9	10	11	Rank	Points
2025	VSF Sports	JS2 R	Ligier JS2 R	BAR; 1	BAR; 2	LEC; 1	LEC; 2	LMS	SPA; 1; 1	**SPA**; **2**; 2	SIL; 1; 2	**SIL**; **2**; 2	ALG; 1; 1	**ALG**; **2**; 1	4th	129
