= 2021 French GT4 Cup =

Sports car championship

The 2021 Championnat de France FFSA GT - GT4 France season was the twenty-fourth season of the French FFSA GT Championship and the fourth as the French GT4 Cup, a Sports car championship created and organised by the Stephane Ratel Organisation (SRO). The season began on 3 April in Nogaro and ended on 3 October at Paul Ricard.

== Calendar ==
Round	Circuit	Date
1	Circuit Paul Armagnac, Nogaro, France	3–5 April
2	Circuit de Nevers Magny-Cours, Magny-Cours, France	7–9 May
3	Circuit d'Albi, Albi, France	4–6 June
4	Circuit de Spa-Francorchamps, Stavelot, Belgium	23–25 July
5	Circuit de Lédenon, Lédenon, France	10–12 September
6	Circuit Paul Ricard, Le Castellet, France	1–3 October

== Entry list ==
Team	Car	No.	Drivers	Class	Rounds
(France) AGS Events	Aston Martin Vantage AMR GT4	007	(France) Valentin Hasse-Clot	S	1
(France) AGS Events	Aston Martin Vantage AMR GT4	007	(France) Romain Leroux	S	1
(France) AGS Events	Aston Martin Vantage AMR GT4	79	(France) Lauris Nauroy	Am	1
(France) AGS Events	Aston Martin Vantage AMR GT4	79	(France) Stephane Desbrosse	Am	1
(France) AGS Events	Aston Martin Vantage AMR GT4	89	(France) Nicolas Gomar	PA	1
(France) AGS Events	Aston Martin Vantage AMR GT4	89	(France) Mike Parisy	PA	1
(France) AGS Events	Aston Martin Vantage AMR GT4	161	(France) Christophe Carrierè	Am	1
(France) AGS Events	Aston Martin Vantage AMR GT4	161	(France) Didier Dumaine	Am	1
(Spain) CD Sport	Mercedes-AMG GT4	2	(France) Jean-Ludovic Foubert	PA	1
(Spain) CD Sport	Mercedes-AMG GT4	2	(France) Edouard Cauhaupé	PA	1
(Spain) CD Sport	Mercedes-AMG GT4	3	(France) Paul Parantheon	Am	1
(Spain) CD Sport	Mercedes-AMG GT4	3	(France) Aurelien Robineau	Am	1
(Spain) CD Sport	Mercedes-AMG GT4	4	(Lebanon) Jihad Aboujaoudé	Am	1
(Spain) CD Sport	Mercedes-AMG GT4	4	(Lebanon) Shahan Sargsyan	Am	1
(Spain) CD Sport	Mercedes-AMG GT4	74	(France) Enzo Joulié	S	1
(Spain) CD Sport	Mercedes-AMG GT4	74	(France) Sébastien Baud	S	1
(France) Team Fullmotorsport	Audi R8 LMS GT4 Evo	5	(France) Christophe Hamon	Am	1
(France) Team Fullmotorsport	Audi R8 LMS GT4 Evo	5	(France) Pascal Huteau	Am	1
(France) Team Fullmotorsport	Audi R8 LMS GT4 Evo	6	(France) Lonni Martins	S	1
(France) Team Fullmotorsport	Audi R8 LMS GT4 Evo	6	(France) Sacha Bottemane	S	1
(France) JSB Compétition	Aston Martin Vantage AMR GT4	8	(France) Jean Laurent Navarro	PA	1
(France) JSB Compétition	Aston Martin Vantage AMR GT4	8	(France) Julien Briché	PA	1
(Spain) Mirage Racing	Alpine A110 GT4	13	(France) Romano Ricci	PA	1
(Spain) Mirage Racing	Alpine A110 GT4	13	(France) Vincent Beltoise	PA	1
(Spain) Mirage Racing	Alpine A110 GT4	222	(France) Rodolphe Wallgren	PA	1
(Spain) Mirage Racing	Alpine A110 GT4	222	(France) Gael Castelli	PA	1
(Spain) Mirage Racing	Aston Martin Vantage AMR GT4	38	(France) Yves Lemaitre	PA	1
(Spain) Mirage Racing	Aston Martin Vantage AMR GT4	38	(United Kingdom) Ruben Del Sarte	PA	1
(France) Saintéloc Racing	Audi R8 LMS GT4 Evo	14	(France) Cyril Saleilles	PA	1
(France) Saintéloc Racing	Audi R8 LMS GT4 Evo	14	(France) Adrien Tambay	PA	1
(France) Saintéloc Racing	Audi R8 LMS GT4 Evo	21	(France) Olivier Esteves	Am	1
(France) Saintéloc Racing	Audi R8 LMS GT4 Evo	21	(France) Anthony Beltoise	Am	1
(France) Saintéloc Racing	Audi R8 LMS GT4 Evo	42	(France) Fabien Michal	PA	1
(France) Saintéloc Racing	Audi R8 LMS GT4 Evo	42	(France) Gregory Guilvert	PA	1
(Spain) NM Racing Team	Mercedes-AMG GT4	15	(France) Christopher Campbell	PA	1
(Spain) NM Racing Team	Mercedes-AMG GT4	15	(Spain) Lluc Ibáñez	PA	1
(Spain) NM Racing Team	Mercedes-AMG GT4	67	(Spain) Alberto Martin	Am	1
(Spain) NM Racing Team	Mercedes-AMG GT4	67	(Andorra) Marc Oriol Lopez Gutierrez	Am	1
(France) AKKA ASP Team	Mercedes-AMG GT4	16	(France) Fabien Barthez	PA	1
(France) AKKA ASP Team	Mercedes-AMG GT4	16	(France) Thomas Drouet	PA	1
(France) AKKA ASP Team	Mercedes-AMG GT4	81	(France) Eric Debard	PA	1
(France) AKKA ASP Team	Mercedes-AMG GT4	81	(France) Simon Gachet	PA	1
(France) AKKA ASP Team	Mercedes-AMG GT4	87	(France) Jean-Luc Beaubelique	PA	1
(France) AKKA ASP Team	Mercedes-AMG GT4	87	(France) Jim Pla	PA	1
(France) AKKA ASP Team	Mercedes-AMG GT4	88	(France) Paul Evrard	S	1
(France) AKKA ASP Team	Mercedes-AMG GT4	88	(France) Timothé Buret	S	1
(France) K-Worx Racing	Ginetta G55 GT4	23	(France) Nelson Lukes	TBA	1
(France) K-Worx Racing	Ginetta G55 GT4	23	(France) Benoit Castagné	TBA	1
(France) TGR CMR	Toyota GR Supra GT4	30	(France) Wilfried Cazalbon	S	1
(France) TGR CMR	Toyota GR Supra GT4	30	(France) Loris Cabirou	S	1
(France) TGR CMR	Toyota GR Supra GT4	34	(Belgium) Antoine Potty	S	1
(France) TGR CMR	Toyota GR Supra GT4	34	(France) Erwan Bastard	S	1
(France) CMR	Alpine A110 GT4	36	(France) Rudy Servol	PA	1
(France) CMR	Alpine A110 GT4	36	(France) Nicolas Prost	PA	1
(France) CMR	Alpine A110 GT4	110	(France) Matéo Herrero	Am	1
(France) CMR	Alpine A110 GT4	110	(Belgium) Stéphane Lémeret	Am	1
(France) Bodemer Auto	Alpine A110 GT4	35	(France) Alain Ferté	PA	1
(France) Bodemer Auto	Alpine A110 GT4	35	(France) Grégoire Demoustier	PA	1
(France) Bodemer Auto	Alpine A110 GT4	76	(France) Jean-Charles Rédélé	Am	1
(France) Bodemer Auto	Alpine A110 GT4	76	(France) Laurent Coubard	Am	1
(France) L'Espace Bienvenue	BMW M4 GT4	50	(France) Christian Philippon	Am	1
(France) L'Espace Bienvenue	BMW M4 GT4	50	(France) Franck Labescat	Am	1
(France) Team Jouffruit by Vic'TEAM	Mercedes-AMG GT4	64	(France) Olivier Jouffret	PA	1
(France) Team Jouffruit by Vic'TEAM	Mercedes-AMG GT4	64	(France) Eric Trémoulet	PA	1
EntryLists:

Icon	Class
S	Silver Cup
PA	Pro-Am Cup
Am	Am Cup
G	Guest drivers ineligible to score points

== Race results ==
Bold indicates overall winner.

Round		Circuit	Pole position	Silver Winners	Pro-Am Winners	Am Winners
1	R1	(France) Nogaro	(France) No.35 Bodemer Auto	(France) No.88 AKKA ASP Team	**(Spain) No.222 Mirage Racing**	(France) No.5 Team Fullmotorsport
1	R1	(France) Nogaro	(France) Alain Ferté (France) Grégoire Demoustier	(France) Paul Evrard (France) Timothé Buret	**(France) Rodolphe Wallgren** **(France) Gael Castelli**	(France) Christophe Hamon (France) Pascal Huteau
1	R2	(France) Nogaro	(France) No.87 AKKA ASP Team	(France) No.007 AGS Events	**(Spain) No.222 Mirage Racing**	(France) No.76 Bodemer Auto
1	R2	(France) Nogaro	(France) Jean-Luc Beaubelique (France) Jim Pla	(France) Valentin Hasse-Clot (France) Romain Leroux	**(France) Rodolphe Wallgren** **(France) Gael Castelli**	(France) Jean-Charles Rédélé (France) Laurent Coubard
2	R1	(France) Magny-Cours				
2	R2	(France) Magny-Cours				
3	R1	(France) Albi				
3	R2	(France) Albi				
4	R1	(Belgium) Spa-Francorchamps				
4	R2	(Belgium) Spa-Francorchamps				
5	R1	(France) Lédenon				
5	R2	(France) Lédenon				
6	R1	(France) Paul Ricard				
6	R2	(France) Paul Ricard				
Results:

== Championship standings ==
Scoring system

Championship points were awarded for the first ten positions in each race. Entries were required to complete 75% of the winning car's race distance in order to be classified and earn points. Individual drivers were required to participate for a minimum of 25 minutes in order to earn championship points in any race.

Position	**1st**	**2nd**	**3rd**	**4th**	**5th**	**6th**	**7th**	**8th**	**9th**	**10th**
Points	25	18	15	12	10	8	6	4	2	1

=== Drivers' championship ===
Pos.	Driver	Team	NOG (France)	MAG (France)	ALB (France)	SPA (Belgium)	LED (France)	LEC2 (France)	Points
Silver
Pro-Am
Am
Pos.	Driver	Team	NOG (France)	MAG (France)	ALB (France)	SPA (Belgium)	LED (France)	LEC (France)	Points

Key
Colour	Result
Gold	Race winner
Silver	2nd place
Bronze	3rd place
Green	Points finish
Blue	Non-points finish
Blue	Non-classified finish (NC)
Purple	Did not finish (Ret)
Black	Disqualified (DSQ)
Black	Excluded (EX)
White	Did not start (DNS)
White	Race cancelled (C)
White	Withdrew (WD)
Blank	Did not participate

**Bold** – Pole
Italics – Fastest Lap

=== Teams' championship ===
Pos.	Driver	Team	NOG (France)	MAG (France)	ALB (France)	SPA (Belgium)	LED (France)	LEC2 (France)	Points
Silver
Pro-Am
Am
Pos.	Driver	Team	NOG (France)	MAG (France)	ALB (France)	SPA (Belgium)	LED (France)	LEC (France)	Points

Key
Colour	Result
Gold	Race winner
Silver	2nd place
Bronze	3rd place
Green	Points finish
Blue	Non-points finish
Blue	Non-classified finish (NC)
Purple	Did not finish (Ret)
Black	Disqualified (DSQ)
Black	Excluded (EX)
White	Did not start (DNS)
White	Race cancelled (C)
White	Withdrew (WD)
Blank	Did not participate

**Bold** – Pole
Italics – Fastest Lap

== See also ==
- 2021 GT4 European Series
- 2021 ADAC GT4 Germany
