= Fabien Michal =

French racing driver (born 1978)

- Michal at Silverstone Circuit in 2026
- Nationality: (France) French
- Born: Fabien André Charles Michal; 7 February 1978 (age 48) Bourgoin-Jallieu, France
- Categorisation: FIA Bronze

Championship titles
- 2021 2018–2020: GT4 European Series – Pro-Am; French GT4 Cup – Pro-Am

Fabien André Charles Michal (born 7 February 1978) is a French racing driver who last competed in the LMP3 class of the European Le Mans Series for R-ace GP.

== Career ==
Michal began rallying at the age of 30, before switching to circuit racing in 2011, competing in select rounds of the Blancpain Endurance Series for Ruffier Racing. After a one-off appearance in the Blancpain Endurance Series for Ruffier Racing the following year, Michal headed back to rallying in 2013, competing until 2015.

Returning to circuit racing in 2017, Michal joined CMR to race in the GT4 European Series Southern Cup. Racing in the Am class alongside Georges Cabanne, the pair scored a lone class win at Nogaro to help them end the year runner-up in the class standings. Switching to Saintéloc Racing for his sophomore season in the series, Michal stepped up to the Pro-Am class alongside Grégory Guilvert, taking three wins en route to their first class title in the French GT4 Cup. At the end of the year, Michal raced in the GT4 International Cup for the same team.

The following year, Michal remained with Saintéloc for his sophomore season in the French GT4 Cup, taking class wins at Pau and Spa to secure his second Pro-Am title in as many years. During 2019, Michal also raced in select rounds of the Blancpain GT Series Endurance Cup for the same team, taking a Pro-Am podium at Monza. Remaining with Saintéloc Racing for the 2020 season, Michal scored class wins at Nogaro and Magny-Cours as he took his third consecutive Pro-Am title. During 2020, Michal also made a one-off appearance in the GT World Challenge Europe Endurance Cup at Le Castellet with the same team. In parallel, Michal also raced in select rounds of the Ligier European Series for HRC in the JS P4 class.

In 2021, Michal remained with Saintéloc Racing for a dual campaign in both the GT4 European Series and the French GT4 Cup. In his first season in the series, Michal scored seven class wins, as well as an overall win at Barcelona, and four other class podiums to seal the Pro-Am title. In the latter, Michal took overall wins at Magny-Cours and Le Castellet as he ended the year runner-up in Pro-Am. During 2021, Michal also raced with the same team in the Algarve round of the European Le Mans Series in the LMP3 class. Continuing with Saintéloc Racing for 2022, Michal only raced with them in the GT4 European Series alongside Grégory Guilvert. In his sophomore season in the series, Michal took class wins at Spa and Hockenheimring as he ended the year third in Pro-Am. During 2022, Michal also raced in select rounds of the Le Mans Cup for CD Sport in the LMP3 class.

Staying with CD Sport for 2023, Michal raced with them for the first round of the Asian Le Mans Series and the full Le Mans Cup season. In his second season in Le Mans Cup, Michal scored a pair of second- and third-place finishes en route to runner-up honors in LMP3. During 2023, Michal made a one-off appearance in the European Le Mans Series at Barcelona for Racing Spirit of Léman, winning on track but later being demoted to third after pitting during the Full Course Yellow. Joining R-ace GP for the 2024 season alongside Hadrien David, Michal took a lone win at Mugello and two other podiums to once again finish runner-up in LMP3.

Returning to the LMP3 class of the European Le Mans Series for 2025, Michal joined EuroInternational alonsgide Ian Aguilera and Sebastian Gravlund. Paired with Aguilera for the entire season, the duo scored a pair of third-place finishes at Le Castellet and Imola to end the year fifth in points. At the end of the year, Michal returned to R-ace GP to race in all but one round of the LMP3 class of the 2025–26 Asian Le Mans Series, taking a best result of fourth in race one at Abu Dhabi.

Michal remained with R-ace GP to continue competing in the LMP3 class of the European Le Mans Series for the rest of 2026. In his first season with the team in ELMS, Michal won at Silverstone and took two other podiums to end the season fourth in points.

== Racing record ==
=== Racing career summary ===
Season	Series	Team	Races	Wins	Poles	F/Laps	Podiums	Points	Position
2011	Blancpain Endurance Series – GT3 Gentlemen	Ruffier Racing	3	2	0	0	3	68	**3rd**
2012	Blancpain Endurance Series – Gentlemen	Ruffier Racing	1	0	0	0	1	18	13th
2017	GT4 European Series Southern Cup – Am	CMR	12	1	0	0	7	164	**2nd**
2018	24H GT Series Continents – GT4	3Y Technology	1	0	0	0	0	20	NC
2018	French GT4 Cup – Pro-Am	Saintéloc Racing	10	3	0	0	5	149	**1st**
2018	GT4 International Cup – Pro-Am	Saintéloc Junior Team	1	0	0	0	0	—N/a	DNF
2019	French GT4 Cup – Pro-Am	Saintéloc Racing	12	2	0	0	5	128	**1st**
2019	GT4 South European Series – Pro-Am	Saintéloc Racing	2	2	2	0	2	50	**3rd**
2019	Blancpain GT Series Endurance Cup	Audi Sport Team Saintéloc	2	0	0	0	0	0	NC
2019	Blancpain GT Series Endurance Cup – Pro-Am	Audi Sport Team Saintéloc	2	0	0	0	1	18	16th
2020	French GT4 Cup – Pro-Am	Saintéloc Racing	12	2	0	0	6	168	**1st**
2020	GT World Challenge Europe Endurance Cup	Saintéloc Racing	1	0	0	0	0	0	NC
2020	GT World Challenge Europe Endurance Cup – Am	Saintéloc Racing	1	0	1	1	1	25	9th
2020	Ligier European Series – JS2 R	HRC	6	0	0	0	4	79	6th
2021	GT4 European Series – Pro-Am	Saintéloc Racing	12	7	3	0	11	246	**1st**
2021	French GT4 Cup – Pro-Am	Saintéloc Junior Team	12	2	1	0	5	125	**2nd**
2021	European Le Mans Series – LMP3	Saintéloc Junior Team	1	0	0	0	0	0	NC
2022	GT4 European Series – Pro-Am	Saintéloc Racing	12	2	0	0	5	142	**3rd**
2022	Le Mans Cup – LMP3	CD Sport	5	0	0	0	0	21	11th
2023	Asian Le Mans Series – LMP3	CD Sport	2	0	0	0	0	16	10th
2023	Le Mans Cup – LMP3	CD Sport	7	0	1	0	4	69	**2nd**
2023	European Le Mans Series – LMP3	Racing Spirit of Léman	1	0	0	0	1	15	13th
2024	Prototype Winter Series – Class 3	R-ace GP	1	1	1	0	1	9.29	12th
2024	Le Mans Cup – LMP3	R-ace GP	7	1	5	0	3	68	**2nd**
2024	European Endurance Prototype Cup – LMP3	R-ace GP	0	0	0	0	0	0	NC
2024	European Endurance Prototype Cup – LMP3	CMR	2	0	0	0	0	0	NC
2025	European Le Mans Series – LMP3	EuroInternational	6	0	0	0	2	60	5th
2025	European Endurance Prototype Cup	Switch Racing	1	0	0	0	0	10	32nd
2025–26	Asian Le Mans Series – LMP3	R-ace GP	4	0	0	0	0	30	13th
2026	European Le Mans Series – LMP3	R-ace GP	6	1	0	0	3	76	4th

^{*} Season in progress.

=== Complete GT World Challenge Europe results ===
==== GT World Challenge Europe Endurance Cup ====
(key) (Races in bold indicate pole position) (Races in italics indicate fastest lap)

Year	Team	Car	Class	1	2	3	4	5	6	7	8	Pos.	Points
2011	Ruffier Racing	Lamborghini Gallardo GT3	GT3 Gentlemen	MNZ	NAV; 15	SPA; 6H	SPA; 12H	SPA; 24H	MAG; 16	SIL; 18		3rd	68
2012	Ruffier Racing	Lamborghini Gallardo GT3	Gentlemen	MNZ	SIL	LEC	SPA; 6H	SPA; 12H	SPA; 24H	NÜR; 36	NAV	13th	18
2019	Audi Sport Team Saintéloc	Audi R8 LMS Evo	Pro-Am	MNZ; 29	SIL; Ret	LEC	SPA; 6H	SPA; 12H	SPA; 24H	CAT		16th	18
2020	Saintéloc Racing	Audi R8 LMS Evo	Am	IMO	NÜR	SPA; 6H	SPA; 12H	SPA; 24H	**LEC**; 30			9th	25

=== Complete GT4 European Series results ===
(key) (Races in bold indicate pole position) (Races in italics indicate fastest lap)

Year	Team	Car	Class	1	2	3	4	5	6	7	8	9	10	11	12	Pos	Points
2021	Saintéloc Racing	Audi R8 LMS GT4 Evo	Pro-Am	MNZ; 1; 7	MNZ; 2; 3	**LEC**; **1**; 9	**LEC**; **2**; 3	**ZAN**; **1**; 2	ZAN; 2; 2	SPA; 1; 11	SPA; 2; 7	NÜR; 1; 8	NÜR; 2 Ret	CAT; 1; 1	CAT; 2; 3	1st	246
2022	Saintéloc Racing	Audi R8 LMS GT4 Evo	Pro-Am	IMO; 1; 24	IMO; 2; 3	LEC; 1; 16	LEC; 2; 16	MIS; 1; 2	MIS; 2; 15	SPA; 1; 9	SPA; 2; 5	HOC; 1; 36†	HOC; 2; 4	CAT; 1; 9	CAT; 2; 9	3rd	142

=== Complete European Le Mans Series results ===
(key) (Races in bold indicate pole position; results in italics indicate fastest lap)

Year	Entrant	Class	Chassis	Engine	1	2	3	4	5	6	Rank	Points
2021	Saintéloc Racing	LMP3	Ligier JS P320	Nissan VK56DE 5.6L V8	CAT	RBR	LEC	MNZ	SPA	ALG; 5	NC†	0
2023	Racing Spirit of Léman	LMP3	Ligier JS P320	Nissan VK56DE 5.6 L V8	CAT; 3	LEC	ARA	SPA	PRT	ALG	13th	15
2025	EuroInternational	LMP3	Ligier JS P325	Toyota V35A 3.5 L V6	CAT; Ret	LEC; 3	IMO; 3	SPA; 4	SIL; 7	ALG; 4	5th	60
2026	R-ace GP	LMP3	Duqueine D09	Toyota V35A 3.5 L V6	**CAT**; 2	LEC; 6	IMO; 8	**SPA**; 2	SIL; 1	ALG; 10	4th	76

^{*} Season still in progress.

† As Michal was a guest driver, he was ineligible for points

=== Complete Le Mans Cup results ===
(key) (Races in bold indicate pole position; results in italics indicate fastest lap)

Year	Entrant	Class	Chassis	1	2	3	4	5	6	7	Rank	Points
2022	CD Sport	LMP3	Ligier JS P320	LEC; 7	IMO; 5	LMS; 1; 20	LMS; 2; 6	MNZ	SPA; 16	ALG	11th	21
2023	CD Sport	LMP3	Ligier JS P320	CAT; 3	LMS; 1 Ret	**LMS**; **2**; 3	LEC; 19	ARA; 6	SPA; 2	ALG; 2	2nd	69
2024	R-ace GP	LMP3	Duqueine M30 - D08	**CAT**; 2	**LEC**; 3	LMS; 1; 21	LMS; 2; 5	**SPA**; Ret	**MUG**; 1	**ALG**; 14	2nd	68

=== Complete Asian Le Mans Series results ===
(key) (Races in bold indicate pole position) (Races in italics indicate fastest lap)

Year	Team	Class	Car	Engine	1	2	3	4	5	6	Pos.	Points
2023	CD Sport	LMP3	Ligier JS P320	Nissan VK56DE 5.6L V8	DUB; 1; 7	DUB; 2; 5	ABU; 1	ABU; 2			10th	16
2025–26	R-ace GP	LMP3	Duqueine D09	Toyota V35A 3.5 L V6	SEP; 1; 8	SEP; 2; 6	DUB; 1	DUB; 2	ABU; 1; 4	ABU; 2; 7	13th	30
