= Thomas Drouet =

French racing driver (born 1998)

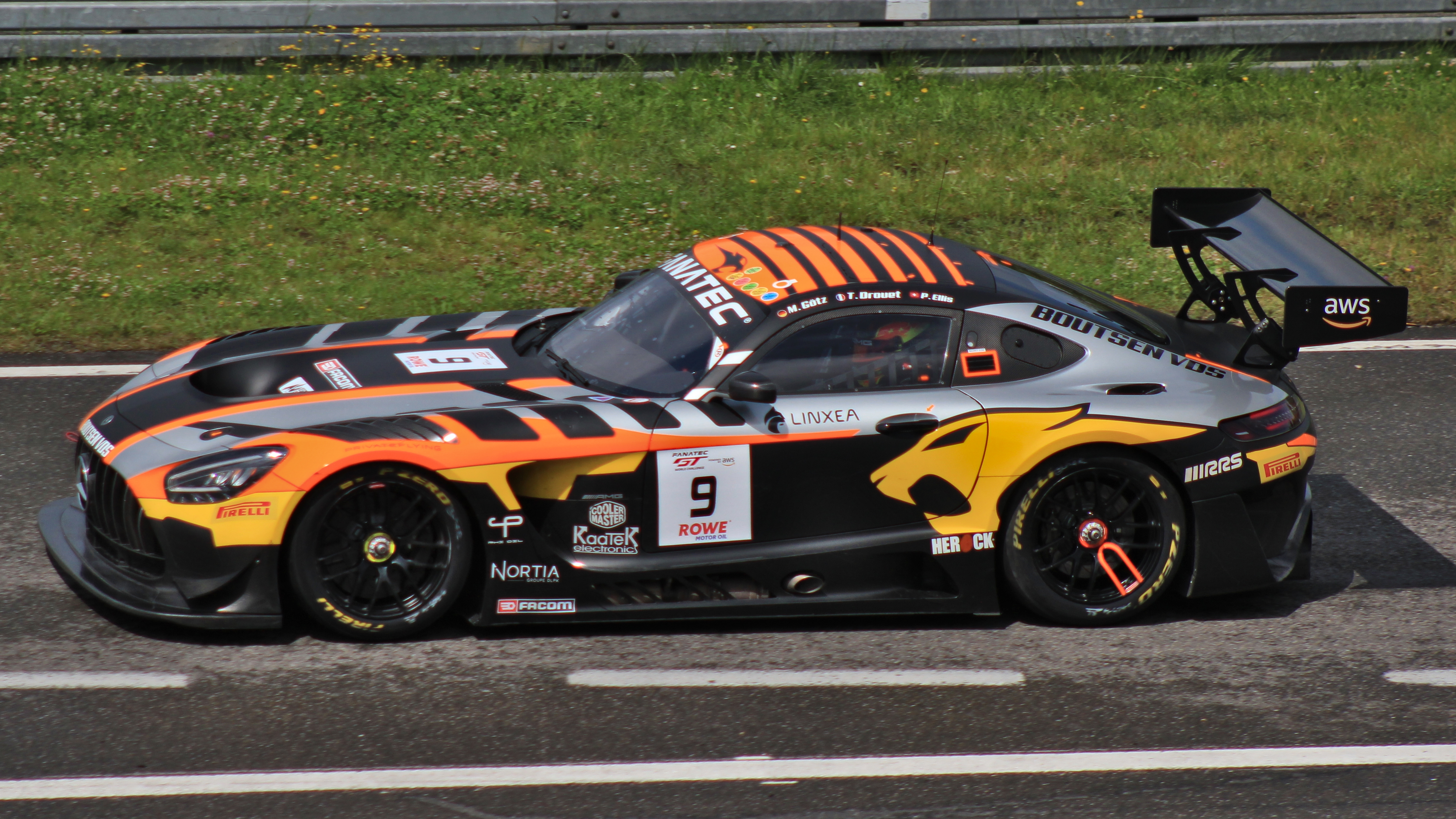
- Drouet in 2024
- Nationality: (France) French
- Born: Thomas Corantin Drouet; 17 November 1998 (age 27) Mont-De-Marsan, France

GT World Challenge Europe Endurance Cup career
- Debut season: 2021
- Current team: HRT Ford Performance
- Categorisation: FIA Silver (until 2022); FIA Gold (2023–)
- Car number: 64
- Former teams: AKKA ASP, Boutsen VDS
- Starts: 36
- Wins: 2
- Podiums: 11
- Poles: 2
- Fastest laps: 2
- Best finish: 1st in 2021

Championship titles
- 2021: French GT4 Cup – Pro-Am

Thomas Corantin Drouet (born 17 November 1998 in Mont-de-Marsan) is a French racing driver competing in the GT World Challenge Europe Endurance Cup for HRT Ford Performance.

== Career ==
Drouet made his single-seater debut in 2017, in the French F4 Championship. In his only year in single-seater competition, Drouet scored one win but struggled to finish higher than eighth outside of that. He finished in 14th place in the standings.

Drouet would switch to GT racing, driving for AKKA ASP in the French GT4 Cup in the Pro-Am class. Drouet also competed in the GT4 International Cup with the same team and the owner, Jérôme Policand. In the GT4 Cup, he finished on the podium twice in 12 races and was tenth in the standings. The main race at the International Cup in Bahrain saw Drouet and Policand finish fourth in class and fifth overall.

In 2019, Drouet again competed in the French GT4 Cup with AKKA ASP and scored his first win in GT competition and three podiums, finishing sixth in the Pro-Am class. He raced in two VLN events in a BMW 325i in the V4 class.

Drouet stepped up to compete in two races in the GT World Challenge Europe Endurance Cup in 2020 with AKKA ASP. Driving with Fabien Barthez and Jim Pla, he scored pole position in his first race at the Nürburgring, finishing third in Pro-Am, whilst also setting the fastest lap in class. Then at the 24 Hours of Spa, the team would retire after sustaining damage from an accident after completing 275 laps. Another season in the Silver class in the French GT4 Cup, Drouet finished fourth, winning two rounds.

In 2021, Drouet finally came out on top in the French GT4 Cup, winning the Pro-Am title with AKKA ASP Team at the final round in Paul Ricard. He competed in the full GT World Challenge Europe Endurance Cup in the Silver class. He won two races at Paul Ricard and Barcelona, en route to a second-place finish in the championship.

Drouet had a breakout year in 2022, finishing third in the French GT4 Cup, whilst also racing full-time in the GT World Challenge Europe Sprint Cup and four races in the GT World Challenge Europe Endurance Cup with AKKODIS ASP Team. In the sprint cup, he finished on the podium seven times placing second in the Silver class. In the endurance cup, he finished ninth, with one fastest lap and podium. Following this season, he was promoted by the FIA from Silver to Gold categorisation.

Following his upgrade to Gold, Drouet competed in the Pro class in the 2023 GT World Challenge Europe Endurance Cup. The season was tough for Drouet and Mercedes-AMG Team AKKodis ASP, finishing in the points only once at Barcelona, placing 22nd overall.

In 2024, Drouet raced with Boutsen VDS in the GT World Challenge Europe Endurance Cup for the full season with Maximilian Götz and a rotation of Mercedes-AMG drivers. it was a relatively average season, with a highest finish of sixth at Monza, Drouet finished in 12th overall.

Drouet left Mercedes and joined Ford for the 2025 season competing in the GT World Challenge Europe Endurance Cup with HRT Ford Performance in the pro class.

== Karting record ==
=== Karting career summary ===
Season	Series	Team	Position
2008	Coupe de France - Minime	Denoy Racing Service	42nd
2009	Championnat de France - Minime	Denoy Racing Service	19th
2010	Championnat du Sud - Minime	Denoy racing Service	3rd
2011	Grand Prix Open Karting France - KF3	DR Racing France	?
2012	Championnat Regional Midi-Pyrenees - Nationale	DR Racing France	1st
2013	Championnat du Sud - Nationale	DR Racing France	1st
2014	Championnat de France - Nationale 150	DR Racing France	20th
2015	Rotax Max Wintercup - Senior Max	RM Concept	19th
2015	National Series Karting - Rotax Senior	RM Concept	5th
2016	Rotax Wintercup - Senior Max	RM Concept	10th
2016	National Series Karting - Rotax Max	RM Concept	3rd

== Racing record ==
=== Racing career summary ===
Season	Series	Team	Races	Wins	Poles	F/Laps	Podiums	Points	Position
2017	French F4 Championship	FFSA Academy	21	1	0	0	1	41	14th
2018	French GT4 Cup - Pro-Am	AKKA ASP Team	12	0	0	0	2	54	10th
2018	GT4 International Cup	AKKA ASP Team	3	0	0	0	0	N/A	5th
2019	French GT4 Cup - Pro-Am	AKKA-ASP Team	12	1	0	0	3	83	6th
2019	VLN Series - V4	Jaco's Paddock Motorsport	2	0	0	0	0	12.37	51st
2020	French GT4 Cup - Silver	AKKA ASP	12	2	2	1	7	187	4th
2020	GT World Challenge Europe Endurance Cup	AKKA ASP	2	0	0	0	0	0	NC
2020	GT World Challenge Europe Endurance Cup - Pro-Am	AKKA ASP	2	0	1	1	1	21	16th
2020	Intercontinental GT Challenge	AKKA ASP	1	0	0	0	0	0	NC
2021	French GT4 Cup - Pro-Am	AKKA ASP Team	12	1	1	1	3	133	**1st**
2021	GT World Challenge Europe Endurance Cup - Silver	AKKA ASP Team	5	2	0	0	2	74	**2nd**
2021	Intercontinental GT Challenge	AKKA ASP Team	1	0	0	0	0	0	NC
2021	International GT Open	AKKA ASP Team	2	0	0	2	1	20	18th
2022	French GT4 Cup - Silver	AKKODIS ASP Team	10	1	0	0	4	97	**3rd**
2022	GT World Challenge Europe Endurance Cup	AKKODIS ASP Team	4	0	0	0	0	4	32nd
2022	GT World Challenge Europe Endurance Cup - Silver	AKKODIS ASP Team	4	0	0	1	1	33	9th
2022	Intercontinental GT Challenge	AKKODIS ASP Team	1	0	0	0	0	0	NC
2022	GT World Challenge Europe Sprint Cup	AKKODIS ASP Team	10	0	0	0	0	12	13th
2022	GT World Challenge Europe Sprint Cup - Silver	AKKODIS ASP Team	10	0	0	0	7	88	**2nd**
2023	GT World Challenge Europe Endurance Cup	Akkodis ASP Team	5	0	0	0	0	6	22nd
2023	Intercontinental GT Challenge	Akkodis ASP Team	1	0	0	0	0	0	NC
2023	French GT4 Cup - Pro-Am	Akkodis ASP Team	2	0	0	0	0	6	17th
2024	GT World Challenge Europe Endurance Cup	Boutsen VDS	5	0	0	0	0	24	12th
2024	Intercontinental GT Challenge	Boutsen VDS	1	0	0	0	0	0	NC
2025	GT World Challenge Europe Endurance Cup	HRT Ford Performance	5	0	0	0	0	8	20th
2026	GT World Challenge Europe Endurance Cup	HRT Ford Racing	5	0	1	0	0	16	16th
2026	French GT4 Cup - Pro-Am	Akkodis ASP Team							

=== Complete French F4 Championship results ===
(key) (Races in bold indicate pole position) (Races in italics indicate fastest lap)

Year	1	2	3	4	5	6	7	8	9	10	11	12	13	14	15	16	17	18	19	20	21	Pos	Points
2017	NOG; 1; 11	NOG; 2; 10	NOG; 3; 11	MNZ; 1; 11	MNZ; 2 Ret	MNZ; 3; 8	PAU; 1; 10	PAU; 2; 1	PAU; 3; 10	SPA; 1; 10	SPA; 2 Ret	SPA; 3; 10	MAG; 1; 9	MAG; 2; 9	MAG; 3; 12	CAT; 1; 9	CAT; 2 Ret	CAT; 3 Ret	LEC; 1; 9	LEC; 2; 10	LEC; 3 Ret	14th	41

=== Complete French GT4 Cup results ===
(key) (Races in bold indicate pole position) (Races in italics indicate fastest lap)

Year	Team	Car	Class	1	2	3	4	5	6	7	8	9	10	11	12	Pos.	Points
2018	AKKA ASP Team	Mercedes-AMG GT4	Pro-Am	NOG; 1; 33	NOG; 2; 7	PAU; 1; 11	PAU; 2; 9	DIJ; 1; 3	DIJ; 2; 9	MAG; 1 Ret	MAG; 2; 15	CAT; 1; 3	CAT; 2; 12	LEC; 1; 25	LEC; 2; 9	10th	54
2019	AKKA-ASP Team	Mercedes-AMG GT4	Pro-Am	NOG; 1; 11	NOG; 2; 21	PAU; 1; 7	PAU; 2 Ret	LED; 1; 6	LED; 2; 3	SPA; 1; 8	SPA; 2; 18	MAG; 1; 3	MAG; 2; 1	LEC; 1; 5	LEC; 2 Ret	6th	83
2020	AKKA ASP	Mercedes-AMG GT4	Silver	NOG; 1; 3	NOG; 2; 10	NOG; 3; 26	MAG; 1; 4	MAG; 2; 24	LEC; 1; 2	**LEC**; **2**; **3**	**LEC**; **3**; **3**	ALB; 1; 4	ALB; 2; 26	LEC; 1; 6	LEC; 2; 3	4th	187
2021	AKKA ASP Team	Mercedes-AMG GT4	Pro-Am	NOG; 1; 4	NOG; 2; 5	MAG; 1 Ret	MAG; 2; 4	ALB; 1; 6	ALB; 2; 7	SPA; 1; 2	**SPA**; **2**; **1**	LED; 1; 10	LED; 2; 4	LEC; 1; 5	LEC; 2; 3	1st	133
2022	AKKODIS ASP Team	Mercedes-AMG GT4	Silver	NOG; 1; 4	NOG; 2; 4	MAG; 1; 8	MAG; 2; 1	ALB; 1 DSQ	ALB; 2; 2	SPA; 1; 9	SPA; 2; 14	LED; 1; 5	LED; 2; 3	LEC; 1; 4	LEC; 2; 23	3rd	97
2023	Akkodis ASP Team	Mercedes-AMG GT4	Pro-Am	NOG; 1	NOG; 2	MAG; 1; 30	MAG; 2; 18	DIJ; 1	DIJ; 2	VAL; 1	VAL; 2	LED; 1	LED; 2	LEC; 1	LEC; 2	17th	6

=== Complete GT World Challenge Europe results ===
==== GT World Challenge Europe Endurance Cup ====
(key) (Races in bold indicate pole position) (Races in italics indicate fastest lap)

Year	Team	Car	Class	1	2	3	4	5	6	7	Pos.	Points
2020	AKKA ASP	Mercedes-AMG GT3 Evo	Pro-Am	IMO	**NÜR**; 21	SPA; 6H; 53	SPA; 12H; 42	SPA; 24H; Ret	LEC		16th	21
2021	AKKA ASP Team	Mercedes-AMG GT3 Evo	Silver	MNZ; 11	LEC; 11	SPA; 6H; 40	SPA; 12H; 34	SPA; 24H; 23	NÜR; Ret	CAT; 11	2nd	74
2022	AKKODIS ASP Team	Mercedes-AMG GT3 Evo	Silver	IMO	LEC; 8	SPA; 6H; 54	SPA; 12H; 44	SPA; 24H; Ret	HOC; 16	CAT; 22	9th	33
2023	Akkodis ASP Team	Mercedes-AMG GT3 Evo	Pro	MNZ; 13	LEC; 13	SPA; 6H; 15	SPA; 12H; 10	SPA; 24H; Ret	NÜR; Ret	CAT; 7	22nd	6
2024	Boutsen VDS	Mercedes-AMG GT3 Evo	Pro	LEC; 16	SPA; 6H; 2	SPA; 12H; 9	SPA; 24H; 18	NÜR; 7	MNZ; 6	JED; 12	12th	24
2025	HRT Ford Performance	Ford Mustang GT3	Pro	LEC; 11	MNZ; Ret	SPA; 6H; 40	SPA; 12H; 11	SPA; 24H; Ret	NÜR; 6	CAT; 51†	20th	8
2026	HRT Ford Racing	Ford Mustang GT3 Evo	Pro	LEC; 25	**MNZ**; Ret	SPA; 6H; 6	SPA; 12H; 7	SPA; 24H; Ret	NÜR; 6	ALG; 16	16th	16

* Season still in progress

Notes:

- † – Entry did not finish the race but was classified, as it completed more than 75% of the race distance.

==== GT World Challenge Europe Sprint Cup ====
(key) (Races in bold indicate pole position) (Races in italics indicate fastest lap)

Year	Team	Car	Class	1	2	3	4	5	6	7	8	9	10	Pos.	Points
2022	AKKODIS ASP Team	Mercedes-AMG GT3 Evo	Silver	BRH; 1; 8	BRH; 2; 11	MAG; 1; 8	MAG; 2; 12	ZAN; 1; 7	ZAN; 2; 14	MIS; 1; 9	MIS; 2; 16	VAL; 1; 8	VAL; 2; 8	2nd	88

=== Complete 24 Hours of Spa results ===
Year	Team	Co-Drivers	Car	Class	Laps	Pos.	Class Pos.
2020	(France) AKKA ASP	(France) Jean-Luc Beaubelique (France) Fabien Barthez (France) Jim Pla	Mercedes-AMG GT3 Evo	Pro-Am Cup	275	DNF	DNF
2021	(France) AKKA ASP Team	(France) Simon Gachet (Russia) Konstantin Tereshchenko (Romania) Petru Umbrărescu	Mercedes-AMG GT3 Evo	Silver Cup	545	23th	7th
2022	(France) AKKodis ASP Team	(Italy) Tommaso Mosca (United Kingdom) Casper Stevenson	Mercedes-AMG GT3 Evo	Silver Cup	367	DNF	DNF
2023	(France) Mercedes-AMG Team AKKodis ASP	(Italy) Lorenzo Ferrari (Germany) Maximilian Götz	Mercedes-AMG GT3 Evo	Pro Cup	304	DNF	DNF
2024	(Belgium) Boutsen VDS	(Germany) Maximilian Götz (Belgium) Ulysse de Pauw	Mercedes-AMG GT3 Evo	Pro Cup	476	18th	11th
2025	(Germany) HRT Ford Performance	(India) Arjun Maini (United Kingdom) Jann Mardenborough	Ford Mustang GT3	Pro Cup	323	DNF	DNF
