= 2018 GT4 International Cup =

Race details
Date	1 December 2018
Official name	Bahrain GT Festival
Location	Sakhir, Bahrain
Course	Permanent circuit 5.412 km (3.363 mi)
Distance	Qualifying Race 1; 60 minutes Qualifying Race 2; 60 minutes Main Race; 60 minutes
- Qualifying Race 1

Pole
Driver	(Netherlands) Milan Dontje	Phoenix Racing
Time	2:11.555

Fastest lap
Driver	(Netherlands) Milan Dontje	Phoenix Racing
Time	2:13.745 (on lap 5)

Podium
First	(Netherlands) Milan Dontje (Denmark) Nicolaj Møller Madsen	Phoenix Racing
Second	(United Kingdom) Finlay Hutchison (United Kingdom) Matt Nicoll-Jones	Academy Motorsport
Third	(France) Michael Blanchemain (France) Steven Palette	Saintéloc Junior Team
- Qualifying Race 2

Pole
Driver	(France) Steven Palette	Saintéloc Junior Team
Time	2:11.191

Fastest lap
Driver	(France) Steven Palette	Saintéloc Junior Team
Time	2:13.259 (on lap 3)

Podium
First	(Netherlands) Milan Dontje (Denmark) Nicolaj Møller Madsen	Phoenix Racing
Second	(France) Enzo Guibbert (France) Gilles Vannelet	3Y Technology
Third	(United Kingdom) Finlay Hutchison (United Kingdom) Matt Nicoll-Jones	Academy Motorsport
- Main Race

Pole
Driver	(Netherlands) Milan Dontje	Phoenix Racing

Fastest lap
Driver	(Netherlands) Milan Dontje	Phoenix Racing
Time	2:13.167 (on lap 4)

Podium
First	(France) Pierre-Alexandre Jean (France) Pierre Sancinéna	Classic and Modern Racing
Second	(Netherlands) Milan Dontje (Denmark) Nicolaj Møller Madsen	Phoenix Racing
Third	(France) Enzo Guibbert (France) Gilles Vannelet	3Y Technology

The 2018 GT4 International Cup was the first edition of the GT4 International Cup held at Bahrain International Circuit on 1 December 2018. The race was contested with GT4-spec cars. The event promoters were the Bahrain Motorsport Federation (BMF) and the Stéphane Ratel Organisation (SRO).

== Entry list ==
Team	Car	No.	Drivers	Class
(Germany) Phoenix Racing	Audi R8 LMS GT4	3	(Germany) Max Hesse	PA
(Germany) Phoenix Racing	Audi R8 LMS GT4	3	(Poland) Gosia Rdest	PA
(Germany) Phoenix Racing	Audi R8 LMS GT4	5	(Netherlands) Milan Dontje	S
(Germany) Phoenix Racing	Audi R8 LMS GT4	5	(Denmark) Nicolaj Møller Madsen	S
BMW Team France by Ekris Motorsport	Ekris M4 GT4	8	(Netherlands) Ricardo van der Ende	S
BMW Team France by Ekris Motorsport	Ekris M4 GT4	8	(France) Julien Piguet	S
(United Kingdom) Academy Motorsport	McLaren 570S GT4	10	(United Kingdom) Finlay Hutchison	S
(United Kingdom) Academy Motorsport	McLaren 570S GT4	10	(United Kingdom) Matt Nicoll-Jones	S
(Netherlands) Las Moras Racing	McLaren 570S GT4	11	(Netherlands) Liesette Braams	Am
(Netherlands) Las Moras Racing	McLaren 570S GT4	11	(Netherlands) Luc Braams	Am
(Austria) Razoon - More than Racing	KTM X-Bow GT4	13	(Austria) Constantin Schöll	S
(Austria) Razoon - More than Racing	KTM X-Bow GT4	13	(Austria) Reinhard Kofler	S
(France) Classic and Modern Racing	Alpine A110 GT4	26	(France) Antoine Leclerc	PA
(France) Classic and Modern Racing	Alpine A110 GT4	26	(France) David Tuchbant	PA
(France) Classic and Modern Racing	Alpine A110 GT4	36	(France) Pierre-Alexandre Jean	S
(France) Classic and Modern Racing	Alpine A110 GT4	36	(France) Pierre Sancinéna	S
(Spain) Bullitt Racing	Mercedes-AMG GT4	33	(United Kingdom) Andy Meyrick	PA
(Spain) Bullitt Racing	Mercedes-AMG GT4	33	(United Kingdom) Stephen Pattrick	PA
(France) 3Y Technology	BMW M4 GT4	37	(Hong Kong) Philip Kadoorie	PA
(France) 3Y Technology	BMW M4 GT4	37	(Hong Kong) Dan Wells	PA
(France) 3Y Technology	BMW M4 GT4	39	(France) Enzo Guibbert	PA
(France) 3Y Technology	BMW M4 GT4	39	(France) Gilles Vannelet	PA
(Canada) Sportscarboutique	Porsche Cayman GT4 Clubsport MR	38	(Canada) Andrew Danyliw	Am
(Canada) Sportscarboutique	Porsche Cayman GT4 Clubsport MR	38	(Canada) Ethan Simioni	Am
(France) Saintéloc Junior Team	Audi R8 LMS GT4	41	(France) Michael Blanchemain	PA
(France) Saintéloc Junior Team	Audi R8 LMS GT4	41	(France) Steven Palette	PA
(France) Saintéloc Junior Team	Audi R8 LMS GT4	42	(France) Grégory Guilvert	PA
(France) Saintéloc Junior Team	Audi R8 LMS GT4	42	(France) Fabien Michal	PA
(United Kingdom) Generation AMR Super Racing	Aston Martin Vantage GT4	44	(United Kingdom) Matthew George	PA
(United Kingdom) Generation AMR Super Racing	Aston Martin Vantage GT4	44	(United Kingdom) James Holder	PA
(Italy) Scuderia Villorba Corse	Maserati GranTurismo MC GT4	50	(Poland) Antoni Chodzen	PA
(Italy) Scuderia Villorba Corse	Maserati GranTurismo MC GT4	50	(Poland) Piotr Chodzen	PA
(Sweden) Primus Racing	Ginetta G55 GT4	51	(Denmark) Peter Larsen	Am
(Sweden) Primus Racing	Ginetta G55 GT4	51	(Sweden) Johan Rosén	Am
(Sweden) Just Racing	Mercedes-AMG GT4	72	(Sweden) Erik Behrens	Am
(Sweden) Just Racing	Mercedes-AMG GT4	72	(Sweden) Mats Ek Tidstrand	Am
(France) AKKA-ASP Team	Mercedes-AMG GT4	88	(France) Thomas Drouet	S
(France) AKKA-ASP Team	Mercedes-AMG GT4	88	(France) Jérôme Policand	S
(Switzerland) Porsche Zentrum Oberer Zürichsee by TFT Racing	Porsche Cayman GT4 Clubsport MR	222	(Germany) Jan Kasperlik	Am
(Switzerland) Porsche Zentrum Oberer Zürichsee by TFT Racing	Porsche Cayman GT4 Clubsport MR	222	(Switzerland) Niki Leutwiler	Am
(United States) RHC Jorgensen/Strom by MarcCars	BMW M4 GT4	250	(United States) Daren Jorgensen	Am
(United States) RHC Jorgensen/Strom by MarcCars	BMW M4 GT4	250	(United States) Brett Strom	Am

Icon	Class
S	Silver Cup
PA	Pro-Am Cup
Am	Am Cup

== Results ==
=== Main race ===
Pos	Class	#	Team	Drivers	Car	Laps	Gap/Retired
1	S	36	(France) Classic and Modern Racing	(France) Pierre-Alexandre Jean (France) Pierre Sancinéna	Alpine A110 GT4	25	1:00:03.393
2	S	5	(Germany) Phoenix Racing	(Netherlands) Milan Dontje (Denmark) Nicolaj Møller Madsen	Audi R8 LMS GT4	25	+5.677
3	PA	39	(France) 3Y Technology	(France) Enzo Guibbert (France) Gilles Vannelet	BMW M4 GT4	25	+9.337
4	S	10	(United Kingdom) Academy Motorsport	(United Kingdom) Finlay Hutchison (United Kingdom) Matt Nicoll-Jones	McLaren 570S GT4	25	+17.759
5	S	88	(France) AKKA-ASP Team	(France) Thomas Drouet (France) Jérôme Policand	Mercedes-AMG GT4	25	+18.613
6	S	13	(Austria) Razoon - More than Racing	(Austria) Constantin Schöll (Austria) Reinhard Kofler	KTM X-Bow GT4	25	+20.554
7	PA	37	(France) 3Y Technology	(Hong Kong) Philip Kadoorie (United Kingdom) Dan Wells	BMW M4 GT4	25	+31.098
8	PA	3	(Germany) Phoenix Racing	(Germany) Max Hesse (Poland) Gosia Rdest	Audi R8 LMS GT4	25	+32.473
9	PA	44	(United Kingdom) Generation AMR Super Racing	(United Kingdom) Matthew George (United Kingdom) James Holder	Aston Martin Vantage GT4	25	+35.825
10	PA	41	(France) Saintéloc Junior Team	(France) Michael Blanchemain (France) Steven Palette	Audi R8 LMS GT4	25	+51.712
11	Am	250	(United States) RHC Jorgensen/Strom by MarcCars	(United States) Daren Jorgensen (United States) Brett Strom	BMW M4 GT4	25	+57.766
12	Am	51	(Sweden) Primus Racing	(Denmark) Peter Larsen (Sweden) Johan Rosén	Ginetta G55 GT4	25	+1:35.791
13	Am	72	(Sweden) Just Racing	(Sweden) Erik Behrens (Sweden) Mats Tidstrand	Mercedes-AMG GT4	25	+1:45.813
14	Am	50	(Italy) Scuderia Villorba Corse	(Poland) Antoni Chodzen (Poland) Piotr Chodzen	Maserati GranTurismo MC GT4	24	+1 Lap
NC	Am	11	(Netherlands) Las Moras Racing	(Netherlands) Liesette Braams (Netherlands) Luc Braams	McLaren 570S GT4	14	
NC	PA	33	(Spain) Bullitt Racing	(United Kingdom) Andy Meyrick (United Kingdom) Stephen Pattrick	Mercedes-AMG GT4	9	
NC	Am	38	(Canada) Sportscarboutique	(Canada) Andrew Danyliw (Canada) Ethan Simioni	Porsche Cayman GT4 Clubsport MR	4	
NC	PA	26	(France) Classic and Modern Racing	(France) Antoine Leclerc (France) David Tuchbant	Alpine A110 GT4	2	
NC	Am	222	(France) Porsche Zentrum Oberer Zürichsee by TFT Racing	(Germany) Jan Kasperlik (Switzerland) Niki Leutwiler	Porsche Cayman GT4 Clubsport MR	1	
NC	PA	42	(France) Saintéloc Junior Team	(France) Grégory Guilvert (France) Fabien Michal	Audi R8 LMS GT4	0	
DNS	S	8	BMW Team France by Ekris Motorsport	(Netherlands) Ricardo van der Ende (France) Julien Piguet	BMW M4 GT4		

== See also ==
- 2018 FIA GT Nations Cup
