= Enzo Guibbert =

French racing driver (born 1995)

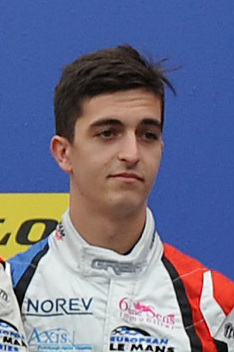
- Guibbert in 2016
- Nationality: (France) French
- Born: 16 June 1995 (age 31) Béziers, France
- Categorisation: FIA Silver (until 2017); FIA Gold (2018–)

Championship titles
- 2018: GT4 International Cup – Pro-Am

Enzo Guibbert (born 16 June 1995) is a French racing driver who last competed for Racing Technology in Porsche Carrera Cup France.

== Career ==
Guibbert began karting at the age of ten, competing until 2023. During his karting career, Guibbert most notably won the 2010 French Karting Championship in the KF2 and the 2011 South European KF2 Trophy.

The following year, Guibbert made his single-seater debut, driving in the FFSA Academy-centrally run French F4 Championship. Starting off the season with a third-place finish at Lédenon, Guibbert then scored second-place finishes at Val de Vienne and Magny-Cours en route to a fourth-place points finish.

Despite winning the Volant Euroformula scholarship, Guibbert left single-seaters in 2013 to join Pro GT by Almeras for his maiden season in the FFSA GT Championship. In his rookie year, Guibbert scored two podiums at Le Mans and Lédenon to end the year 14th in points. Following a part-time campaign for Sport Garage the following year, in which he won the season-ending race at Le Castellet, Guibbert remained with the team for 2015 as he made his Blancpain Endurance Series debut.

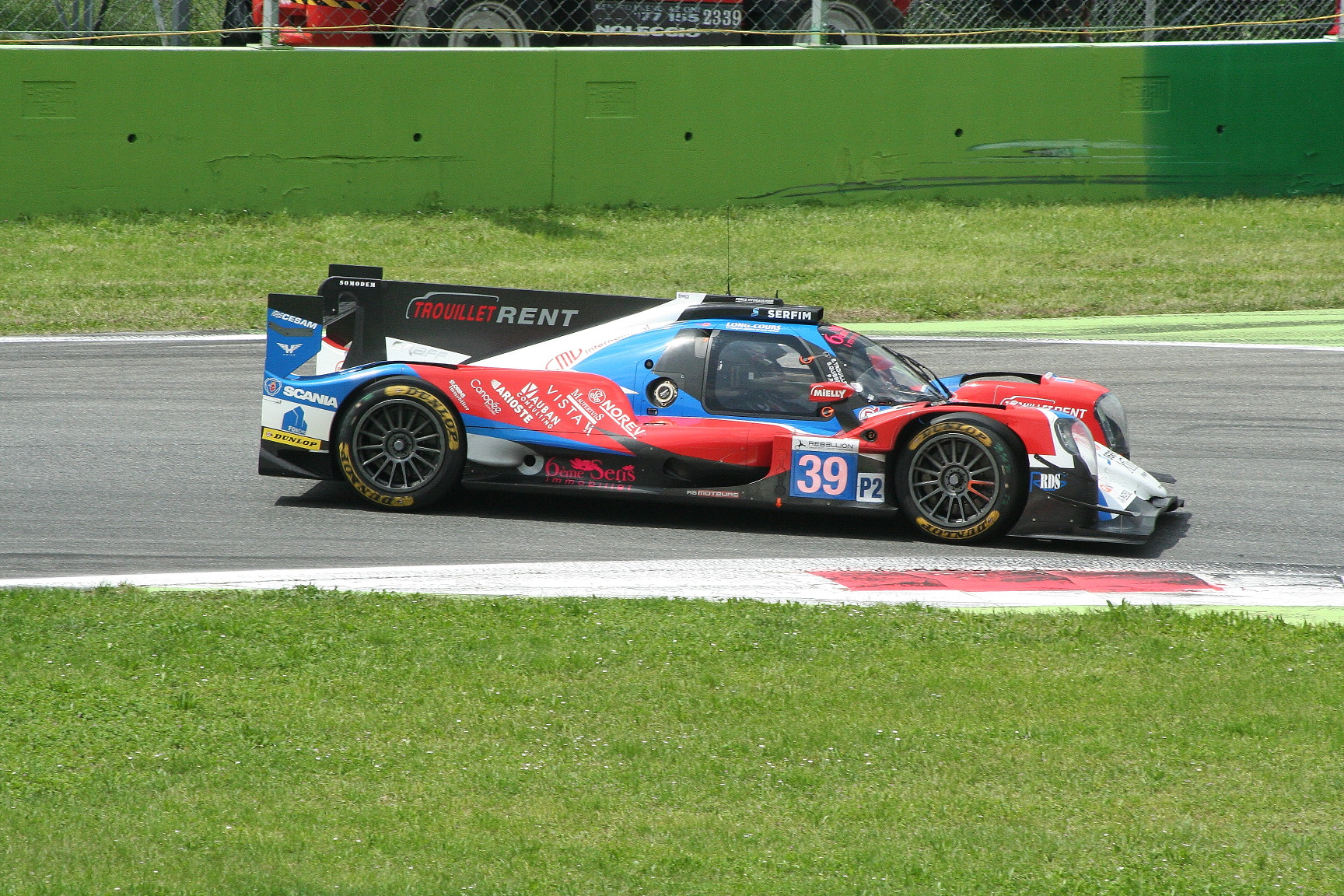
Guibbert took pole in his second ever LMP2 race, the 2017 4 Hours of Monza.

Switching to Endurance Prototypes for 2016, Guibbert joined Graff to race in the LMP3 class of the European Le Mans Series. In his maiden season, Guibbert scored wins at Le Castellet and Spa to end the season third in points despite missing one race. For his sophomore season in the European Le Mans Series, Guibbert stepped up to Graff's LMP2 team alongside Paul Petit and Eric Trouillet. In his maiden season in LMP2 racing, Guibbert qualified on pole at Monza, before finishing third at the Red Bull Ring and Le Castellet to end the year seventh in points.

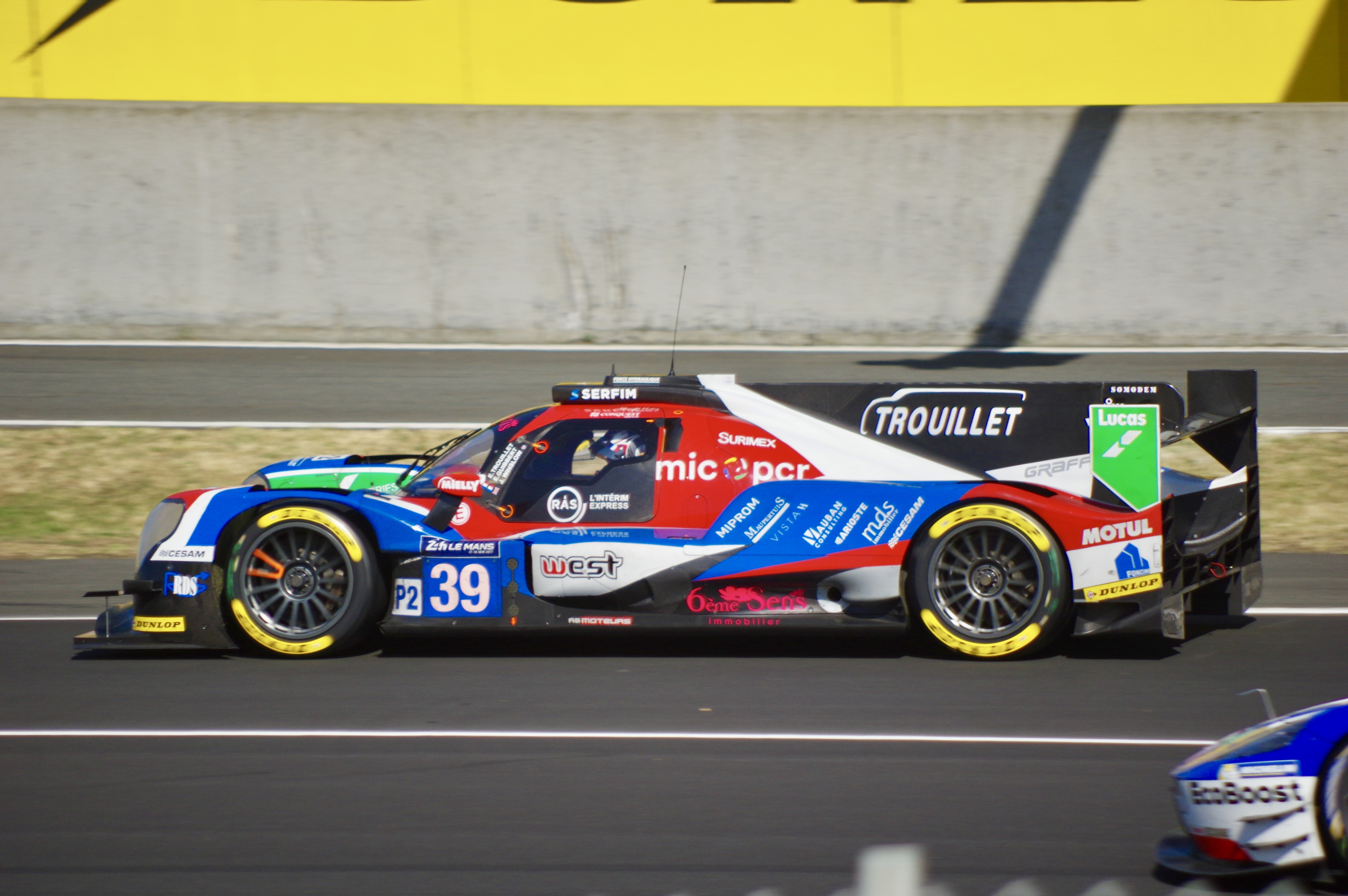
Guibbert's Graff Racing Oreca at the 2017 24 Hours of Le Mans.

Remaining in LMP2 competition for 2018, Guibbert remained with Graff as part of their G-Drive Racing-branded second car alongside James Allen and José Gutiérrez. After racing with them in the first two rounds and the 24 Hours of Le Mans, Guibbert left the team and the series. Following this, Guibbert made a one-off appearance in the French GT4 Cup for 3Y Technology at Magny-Cours, and also tested LMP1 machinery for ByKolles Racing at Spa. Guibbert briefly returned to LMP2 competition by making his FIA World Endurance Championship debut with Larbre Compétition at the 6 Hours of Shanghai. Two months later, Guibbert ended the year by racing in the only edition of the GT4 International Cup with 3Y Technology, in which he finished third overall and won the Pro-Am class.

In 2019, Guibbert joined Racing Technology to race in Porsche Carrera Cup France. scoring a lone podium at Misano as he ended the year fifth in points and securing the Rookie title. During 2019, Guibbert also competed in the 24 Hours of Daytona with PR1/Mathiasen Motorsports in the LMP2 class, and also made a one-off appearance in Porsche Supercup with MRS GT-Racing. At the beginning of 2020, Guibbert's career was put on hold due to a lack of funding.

== Karting record ==
=== Karting career summary ===
Season	Series	Team	Position
2006	Championnat de France – Minime		5th
2007	Championnat de France – Minime		3rd
2008	Bridgestone Cup Europe – KF3		7th
2008	Championnat de France – Cadet		3rd
2008	Bridgestone Cup European Final – KF3		7th
2008	Copa Campeones – KF3	Intrepid France	8th
2009	South Garda Winter Cup – KF3	Michel Guibbert	15th
2009	Monaco Kart Cup – KF3	Michel Guibbert	7th
2009	Karting World Cup – KF3	Michel Guibbert	12th
2009	WSK International Series – KF3	Intrepid Driver Program; Michel Guibbert (Note: Guibbert competed for Intrepid Driver Program in round 2 and as a Privateer in rounds 5, 7.)	26th
2009	Championnat de France – KF3	Action Karting; MRT (Note: Guibbert competed for Action Karting in rounds 1, 4–5 and for MRT in rounds 2–3.)	4th
2009	Karting European Championship – KF3	Intrepid France	NC
2010	South Garda Winter Cup – KF2	Michel Guibbert	15th
2010	WSK Euro Series – KF2	Michel Guibbert	13th
2010	Karting European Championship – KF2	Michel Guibbert	34th
2010	Karting World Championship – KF2	Michel Guibbert	NC
2010	WSK Nations Cup – KF2	Michel Guibbert	34th
2010	Grand Prix Open Karting – KF2	Braun Racing Team	1st
2010	Bruno Grana International Trophy – X30		23rd
2010	Bridgestone Cup Europe – KF2		4th
2011	South Garda Winter Cup – KF2	Michel Guibbert	14th
2011	WSK Euro Series – KF2	Michel Guibbert	25th
2011	Karting World Cup – KF2	Michel Guibbert	13th
2011	South European KF2 Trophy	Michel Guibbert	1st
2011	Grand Prix Open Karting – KF2	Braun Racing; Midi Pyrenees (Note: Guibbert competed for Braun Racing in round 1 and for Midi Pyrenees in round 3.)	15th
2011	Karting European Championship – KF2		NC
2013	Championnat du Sud – KZ125		2nd
2013	Championnat de France – KZ125	Portaries Karting	NC
2014	Coupe de France – KZ125	Portaries Karting	23rd
2014	Championnat de France – KZ125	Portaries Karting	2nd
2015	Trophée Oscar Petit – KZ2		2nd
2015	International Super Cup – KZ2	Enzo Guibbert	NC
2015	Championnat de France – KZ2	Portaries Karting	105th
2016	Championnat de France – KZ2	Portaries Karting	2nd
2017	National Series Karting – KZ2	Portaries Karting	9th
2017	Championnat de France – KZ2	Portaries Karting	5th
2018	Championnat de France – KZ2	Portaries Karting	7th
2019	Championnat de France – KZ2	Portaries Karting	17th
2020	Championnat de France – KZ2	Portaries Karting	18th
2023	IAME Series France – KZ2		3rd

== Racing record ==
=== Racing career summary ===
Season	Series	Team	Races	Wins	Poles	F/Laps	Podiums	Points	Position
2012	French F4 Championship	FFSA Academy	14	0	1	1	3	134	4th
2013	Winter Series by GT Sport – GTS	Pro GT by Alméras	2	0	0	0	1	0	NC
2013	FFSA GT Championship	Pro GT by Alméras	11	0	1	1	2	46	14th
2014	FFSA GT Championship	Sport Garage	6	1	0	0	1	37	13th
2015	Blancpain Endurance Series – Pro-Am	Sport Garage	5	0	0	0	0	14	20th
2015	FFSA GT Championship	Sport Garage	14	0	0	1	2	71	12th
2016	European Le Mans Series – LMP3	Graff	5	2	1	1	4	81	**3rd**
2016	Challenge Endurance LMP3 V de V	Graff	1	0	1	0	1	0	NC
2017	European Le Mans Series – LMP2	Graff	6	0	1	0	2	54	7th
2017	24 Hours of Le Mans – LMP2	Graff	1	0	0	0	0	—N/a	18th
2017	TCR BeNeLux Touring Car Championship	Boutsen Ginion Racing	3	0	0	0	1	58	22nd
2018	European Le Mans Series – LMP2	G-Drive Racing	2	0	0	0	0	8	20th
2018	24 Hours of Le Mans – LMP2	G-Drive Racing	1	0	0	0	0	—N/a	DNF
2018	French GT4 Cup – Pro-Am	3Y Technology	2	0	0	0	0	2	33rd
2018	GT4 International Cup – Pro-Am	3Y Technology	1	1	0	0	1	—N/a	**1st**
2018–19	FIA World Endurance Championship – LMP2	Larbre Compétition	1	0	0	0	0	8	19th
2019	24H GT Series – GT4	3Y Technology	1	0	0	0	0	22	NC
2019	IMSA SportsCar Championship – LMP2	PR1/Mathiasen Motorsports	1	0	0	0	0	28	14th
2019	Porsche Supercup	MRS GT-Racing	1	0	0	0	0	0	30th
2019	Porsche Carrera Cup France	Racing Technology	12	0	0	0	1	125	5th

=== Complete French F4 Championship results ===
(key) (Races in bold indicate pole position; races in italics indicate fastest lap)

Year	1	2	3	4	5	6	7	8	9	10	11	12	13	14	DC	Points
2012	LÉD; 1 Ret	LÉD; 2; 3	PAU; 1; 4	PAU; 2; 4	**VDV**; **1**; 2	VDV; 2; 4	MAG; 1; 2	MAG; 2; 4	NAV; 1; 6	NAV; 2; 5	LMS; 1; 8	LMS; 2; 6	LEC; 1; 9	LEC; 2; 10	4th	134

=== Complete GT World Challenge Europe results ===
==== GT World Challenge Europe Endurance Cup ====
Year	Team	Car	Class	1	2	3	4	5	6	7	Pos.	Pts
2015	Sport Garage	Ferrari 458 Italia GT3	Pro-Am	MNZ; Ret	SIL; 32	LEC; 15	SPA; 6H; 49	SPA; 12H; 39	SPA; 24H; 28	NÜR; 26	20th	14

=== Complete European Le Mans Series results ===
(key) (Races in bold indicate pole position. Races in italics indicate fastest race lap in class. Results are overall/class)

Year	Team	Class	Car	Engine	1	2	3	4	5	6	DC	Points
2016	Graff	LMP3	Ligier JS P3	Nissan VK50VE 5.0 L V8	SIL; 3	IMO; Ret	RBR	LEC; 1	**SPA**; 1	EST; 3	3rd	81
2017	Graff	LMP2	Oreca 07	Gibson GK428 4.2 L V8	SIL; 7	**MNZ**; 4	RBR; 3	LEC; 3	SPA; 6	ALG; Ret	7th	57
2018	G-Drive Racing	LMP2	Oreca 07	Gibson GK428 4.2 L V8	LEC; 6	MNZ; Ret	RBR	SIL	SPA	POR	20th	8

=== 24 Hours of Le Mans results ===
Year	Team	Co-Drivers	Car	Class	Laps	Pos.	Class Pos.
2017	(France) Graff	(France) Eric Trouillet (United Kingdom) James Winslow	Oreca 07-Gibson	LMP2	318	43rd	18th
2018	(Russia) G-Drive Racing	(Australia) James Allen (Mexico) José Gutiérrez	Oreca 07-Gibson	LMP2	197	DNF	DNF

=== Complete FIA World Endurance Championship results ===
Year	Entrant	Class	Car	Engine	1	2	3	4	5	6	7	8	Rank	Points
2018–19	Larbre Compétition	LMP2	Ligier JS P217	Gibson GK428 4.2 L V8	SPA	LMS	SIL	FUJ	SHA; 6	SEB	SPA	LMS	19th	8

=== Complete IMSA SportsCar Championship results ===
(key) (Races in bold indicate pole position; races in italics indicate fastest lap)

Year	Entrant	Class	Make	Engine	1	2	3	4	5	6	7	8	Rank	Points
2019	PR1/Mathiasen Motorsports	LMP2	Oreca 07	Gibson GK428 4.2 L V8	DAY; 4	SEB	MDO	WGL	MOS	ELK	LGA	PET	14th	28

=== Complete Porsche Supercup results ===
(key) (Races in bold indicate pole position) (Races in italics indicate fastest lap)

Year	Team	1	2	3	4	5	6	7	8	9	10	DC	Points
2019	MRS GT-Racing	CAT; 18	MON	RBR	SIL	HOC	HUN	SPA	MNZ	MEX	MEX	30th	0
