= Erwan Bastard =

French racing driver (born 1998)

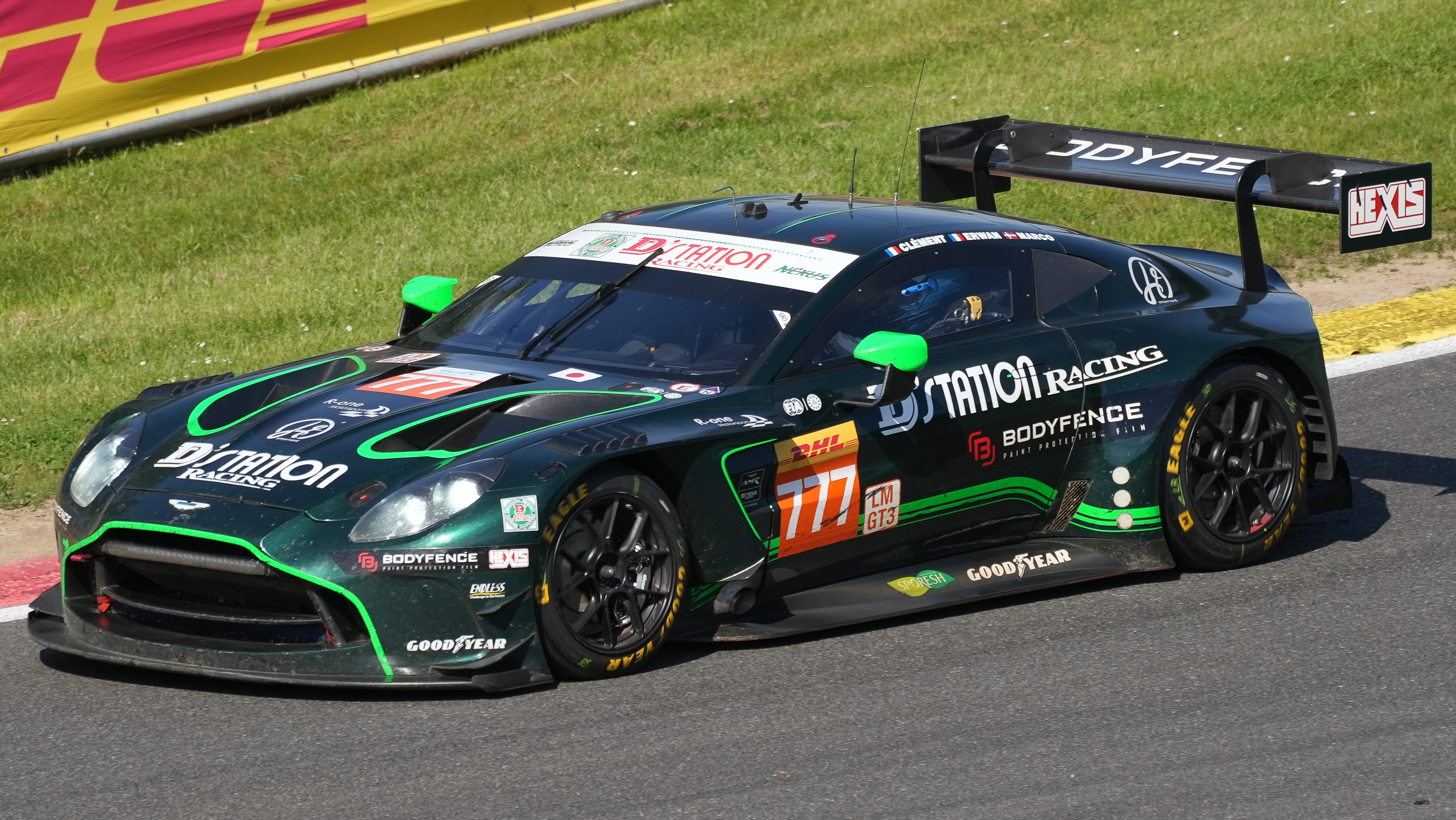
- Nationality: (France) French
- Born: 9 June 1998 (age 28) Loiret, France

GT World Challenge Europe Endurance Cup career
- Debut season: 2023
- Current team: Saintéloc Junior Team
- Categorisation: FIA Silver
- Starts: 1 (1 entries)
- Wins: 0
- Podiums: 0
- Poles: 0
- Fastest laps: 0
- Best finish: TBD in 2023

Previous series
- 2021–22 2019–22: GT4 European Series; French GT4 Cup

Championship titles
- 2022 2022: GT4 European Series; French GT4 Cup

Erwan Bastard (born 9 June 1998) is a French racing driver and engineering student. He will be competing for Saintéloc Junior Team in the GT World Challenge Europe Endurance Cup, having taken the GT4 European Series and French GT4 Cup titles alongside Roee Meyuhas in 2022.

== Early career ==
Having driven in rental karts from the age of eight, Bastard began racing competitively at the age of 13. Following a number of podiums in the Center-Bourgogne Trophy during his debut year, the Frenchman would go on to finish as runner-up of the same series the following season. He then went on to drive in various national championships until the end of 2017.

== GT4 career ==
=== 2018: Sportscar debut ===
The 2018 season saw Bastard stepping up to car racing, teaming up with Pierre-André Nicolas at the FOXO team in the Porsche Club Motorsport France championship. Driving in a Porsche 718 Cayman GT4, the pair took four podiums over the course of the season and ended up second in the standings.

=== 2019: First French GT season ===
Bastard moved to the French GT4 Cup in 2019, where he joined Schatz Lestienne Racing. After a pair of retirements at the season opener in Nogaro, one of which was caused by Bastard after going off into the gravel during Race 1, the Frenchman and his teammate Sylvain Caroff were reallocated from the Pro-Am to the Am category for the remainder of the season. The pairing experienced a positive season, taking five class podiums, including pairs at Lédenon and Magny-Cours respectively, which elevated Bastard to fourth in the drivers' championship.

At the end of the year, Bastard took part in the TTE Endurance at the Circuit de la Sarthe, where he finished third.

=== 2020: Am class title assault ===
ANS Motorsport would be the team Bastard moved to for another assault at the French GT4 Cup in 2020, as he and Caroff returned to the Am class in a Ginetta G55 GT4. The season began positively, as Bastard took his first victory in the series at the season opener in Nogaro and followed that up with a subsequent victory at Magny-Cours, taking the team to the front of the standings. Another win at the Circuit d'Albi coupled with four podiums at the two rounds in Le Castellet brought the outfit into title contention, however they would be forced to settle for third overall at the conclusion of the campaign.

=== 2021: Progression to Silver Cup ===
For 2021, Bastard moved up to the Silver category, driving for TGR CMR alongside Antoine Potty. Despite taking seven podiums, including five from the final five races, Bastard and Potty were unable to get embroiled in the championship fight, eventually landing fourth in the standings.

=== 2022: Title year ===
Pairing up with Roee Meyuhas at Saintéloc Racing, Bastard partook in a double campaign during the 2022 season, driving an Audi R8 LMS GT4 Evo in the GT4 European Series and French GT4 Cup. The pair would control the latter championship, scoring four victories and securing the title with one round remaining. At the same time, Bastard and Meyuhas managed to narrowly beat the duo of Lluc Ibáñez and Enzo Joulié in the European Series, with a race-winning overtake at Spa-Francorchamps and a dominant drive at Hockenheim being a pair of standout performances from the Frenchman.

== GT3 career ==
=== 2022: First GT3 race ===
At the end of 2022, Bastard joined Christopher Haase and Patric Niederhauser at Saintéloc, competing at the Gulf 12 Hours with an Audi R8 LMS Evo II. Having managed to evade mistakes throughout the event, the French driver contributed to a podium finish for the squad, a third place that Bastard called "unbelievable".

=== 2023: Full GTWC season ===
Bastard remained with Saintéloc in 2023, partnering Patric Niederhauser in the GT World Challenge Europe Sprint Cup and being part of the team's Silver Cup line-up in the Endurance Cup alongside Grégoire Demoustier and Paul Evrard. Both campaigns provided limited rewards, as the Endurance Cup trio finished fourth in the standings with a lone class podium at the 24 Hours of Spa, whilst Bastard and Niederhauser were only able to take one podium in the Sprint Cup on their way to tenth in the standings.

=== 2024: WEC with D'station ===
For the 2024 season, Bastard would compete in the World Endurance Championship, driving an Aston Martin Vantage AMR GT3 Evo for D'station Racing. He would help the team towards a podium finish at the opening round in Qatar, where he, Marco Sørensen and Clément Mateu took home third place.

== Racing record ==
=== Racing career summary ===
Season	Series	Team	Races	Wins	Poles	F/Laps	Podiums	Points	Position
2018	Porsche Club Motorsport France	FOXO	?	?	?	?	4	?	**2nd**
2019	French GT4 Cup - Pro-Am	Schatz Lestienne Racing	2	0	0	0	0	0	NC
2019	French GT4 Cup - Am	Schatz Lestienne Racing	10	0	1	0	5	117	4th
2020	French GT4 Cup - Am	ANS Motorsport	12	3	0	3	8	172	**3rd**
2021	French GT4 Cup - Silver	TGR CMR	12	0	0	0	7	153	4th
2022	GT4 European Series - Silver	Saintéloc Racing	12	3	1	1	6	159	**1st**
2022	French GT4 Cup - Silver	Saintéloc Racing	12	4	2	2	7	202	**1st**
2022	Intercontinental GT Challenge	Audi Sport Team Saintéloc	1	0	0	0	1	15	15th
2022-23	Middle East Trophy - GT3	Saintéloc Racing	1	0	0	0	0	0	NC†
2023	GT World Challenge Europe Endurance Cup	Saintéloc Junior Team	5	0	0	0	0	0	NC
2023	GT World Challenge Europe Endurance Cup - Silver	Saintéloc Junior Team	5	0	0	0	1	59	4th
2023	GT World Challenge Europe Sprint Cup	Saintéloc Junior Team	10	0	0	0	1	13	10th
2023	24H GT Series - GT3	Saintéloc Junior Team	2	1	0	0	2	76	7th
2023	Ultimate Cup Series Endurance GT Touring Challenge - 3A	Racing Spirit of Léman	1	0	1	0	1	15	4th
2024	FIA World Endurance Championship - LMGT3	D'station Racing	8	0	0	0	1	50	11th
2024	GT World Challenge Europe Endurance Cup	Comtoyou Racing	1	0	0	0	0	0	NC
2025	European Le Mans Series - LMGT3	Racing Spirit of Léman	6	1	1	0	1	64	**3rd**

* Season still in progress.

=== Complete French GT4 Cup results ===
(key) (Races in bold indicate pole position) (Races in italics indicate fastest lap)

Year	Team	Car	Class	1	2	3	4	5	6	7	8	9	10	11	12	Pos	Points
2019	Schatz Lestienne Racing	Ginetta G55 GT4	Pro-Am	NOG; 1 Ret	NOG; 2 Ret											NC	0
2019	Schatz Lestienne Racing	Ginetta G55 GT4	Am			PAU; 1; 24	PAU; 2; 18	LÉD; 1; 16	LÉD; 2; 18	SPA; 1; 17	SPA; 2 Ret	MAG; 1; 16	MAG; 2; 11	LEC; 1; 27	LEC; 2; 22	4th	117
2020	ANS Motorsport	Ginetta G55 GT4	Am	NOG; 1; 16	NOG; 2; 20	NOG; 3; 15	MAG; 1; 8	**MAG**; **2**; 25†	LEC1; 1 Ret	LEC1; 2; 18	LEC1; 3; 21	ALB; 1; 15	**ALB**; **2** Ret	LEC2; 1; 18	LEC2; 2; 15	3rd	172
2021	TGR CMR	Toyota GR Supra GT4	Silver	NOG; 1; 14	NOG; 2; 8	MAG; 1; 8	MAG; 2; 18	ALB; 1; 7	ALB; 2 Ret	SPA; 1; 30	SPA; 2; 2	LÉD; 1; 12	LÉD; 2; 11	LEC; 1; 5	LEC; 2; 7	4th	153
2022	Saintéloc Racing	Audi R8 LMS GT4 Evo	Silver	NOG; 1; 2	NOG; 2; 5	MAG; 1; 5	**MAG**; **2**; 5	ALB; 1; 6	ALB; 2; 9	SPA; 1; 2	SPA; 2; 1	LÉD; 1; 1	**LÉD**; **2**; 1	LEC; 1; 30	LEC; 2; 4	1st	202

=== Complete GT4 European Series results ===
(key) (Races in bold indicate pole position) (Races in italics indicate fastest lap)

Year	Team	Car	Class	1	2	3	4	5	6	7	8	9	10	11	12	Pos	Points
2022	Saintéloc Racing	Audi R8 LMS GT4 Evo	Silver	IMO; 1; 4	IMO; 2; 4	LEC; 1; 23	LEC; 2; 21	MIS; 1; 32	MIS; 2; 11	SPA; 1; 3	SPA; 2; 1	HOC; 1; 8	**HOC**; **2**; 1	CAT; 1; 2	CAT; 2; 8	1st	159

=== Complete GT World Challenge results ===
==== GT World Challenge Europe Endurance Cup ====
(Races in bold indicate pole position) (Races in italics indicate fastest lap)

Year	Team	Car	Class	1	2	3	4	5	6	7	Pos.	Points
2023	Saintéloc Junior Team	Audi R8 LMS Evo II	Silver	MNZ; 41	LEC; 24	SPA; 6H; 47	SPA; 12H; 43	SPA; 24H; 30	NÜR; 35	CAT; 23	4th	59
2024	Comtoyou Racing	Aston Martin Vantage AMR GT3 Evo	Silver	LEC	SPA; 6H; 60†	SPA; 12H; Ret	SPA; 24H; Ret	NÜR	MNZ	JED	NC	0

^{*}Season still in progress.

==== GT World Challenge Europe Sprint Cup ====
(key) (Races in bold indicate pole position) (Races in italics indicate fastest lap)

Year	Team	Car	Class	1	2	3	4	5	6	7	8	9	10	Pos.	Points
2023	Saintéloc Junior Team	Audi R8 LMS Evo II	Pro	BRH; 1; 28†	BRH; 2; 10	MIS; 1; 17	MIS; 2; 7	HOC; 1; 31†	HOC; 2; 3	VAL; 1; 12	VAL; 2; 17	ZAN; 1 Ret	ZAN; 2 Ret	10th	13

^{*} Season still in progress.

=== Complete FIA World Endurance Championship results ===
Year	Entrant	Class	Car	Engine	1	2	3	4	5	6	7	8	Rank	Points
2024	D'station Racing	LMGT3	Aston Martin Vantage AMR GT3 Evo	Aston Martin 4.0 L Turbo V8	QAT; 3	IMO; 10	SPA; 7	LMS; 7	SÃO; 9	COA; Ret	FUJ; 7	BHR; 12	11th	50

^{*} Season still in progress.

=== Complete 24 Hours of Le Mans results ===
Year	Team	Co-Drivers	Car	Class	Laps	Pos.	Class Pos.
2024	(Japan) D'station Racing	(Japan) Satoshi Hoshino (Denmark) Marco Sørensen	Aston Martin Vantage AMR GT3 Evo	LMGT3	279	36th	9th

=== Complete European Le Mans Series results ===
(key) (Races in bold indicate pole position; races in italics indicate fastest lap)

Year	Team	Class	Car	Engine	1	2	3	4	5	6	Pos.	Points
2025	Racing Spirit of Léman	LMGT3	Aston Martin Vantage AMR GT3 Evo	Aston Martin 4.0 L Turbo V8	BAR; 7	**LEC**; 6	IMO; 7	SPA; 1	SIL; 6	POR; 5	3rd	64
