= Gabriela Jílková =

Czech racing driver (born 1995)

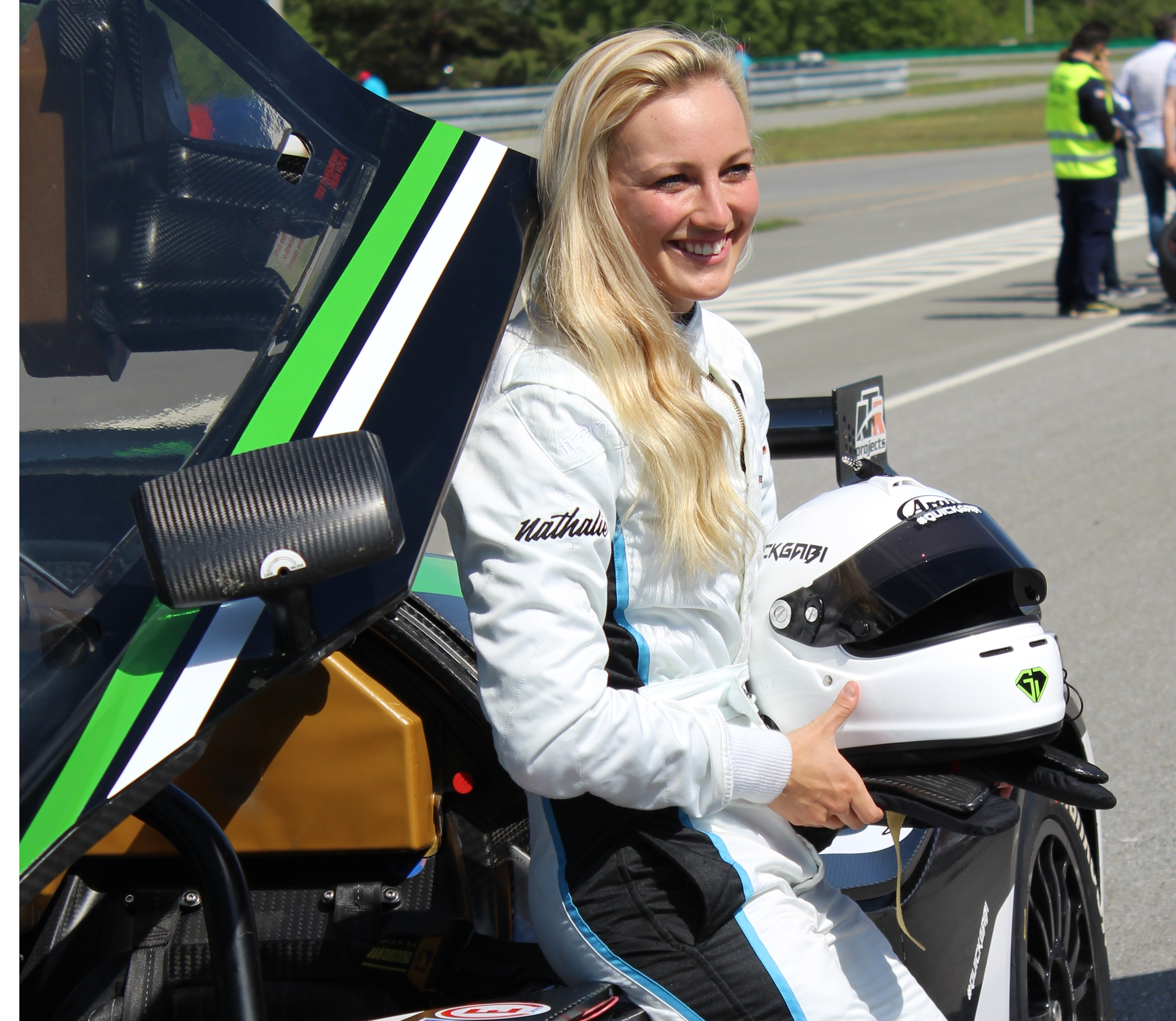
- Jílková in 2019
- Nationality: (Czech Republic) Czech
- Born: 2 April 1995 (age 31) Roztoky, Czech Republic
- Categorisation: FIA Silver

Championship titles
- 2021: GT Winter Series

Gabriela Jílková (born 2 April 1995) is a Czech racing driver who currently competes in the GT4 European Series for TGR Team Matmut Évolution.

Nicknamed 'Quick Gabi', she is a GT Winter Series champion, LMP3 race winner, and a development driver for the Porsche Formula E Team.

== Career ==
Jílková began her career in karting at the age of eight and progressed to car racing by 2012, participating in her local Formula Renault 2.0 NEC round at Autodrom Most. She continued to ply her trade in subsequent years, picking up podiums in FR2.0 cameos before a serious accident at the Red Bull Ring in 2014 halted her career. Upon recovering from her vertebral injury, she raced sporadically in Renault Clio Cup, tackled the 2019 12 Hours of Brno in a KTM X-Bow GT4 and took part in the 2020 W Series selection test. She was briefly a test driver for the RG Nathalie, an electric sports car that planned to enter the ill-fated, FIA-approved Electric Production Car Series.

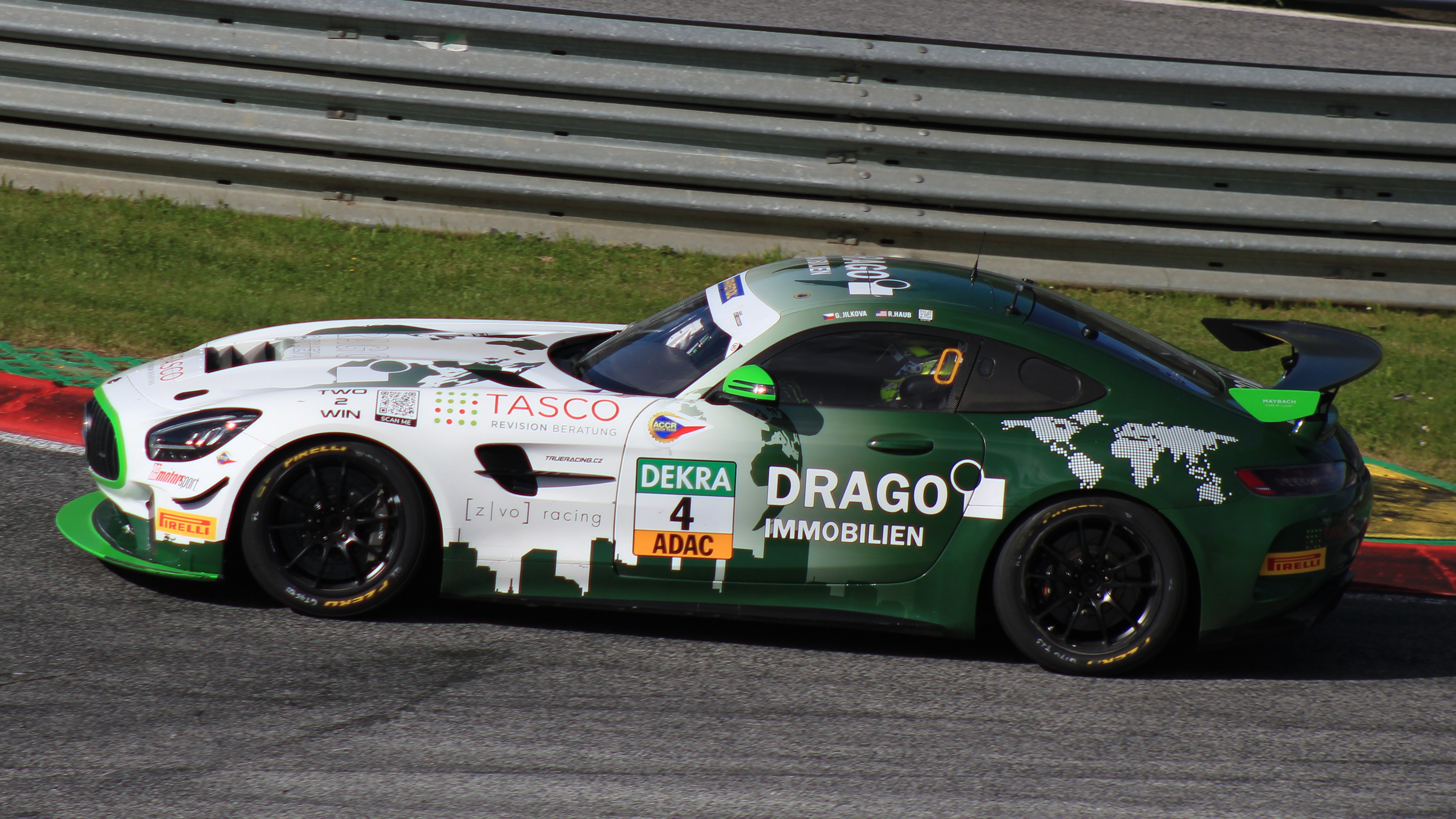
Jílková driving her Drago ZVO Mercedes at the Red Bull Ring in 2022

2021 reignited Jílková's career, with two victories and a shock title in the GT Winter Series' GTS class doubled up with a full-time ADAC GT4 Germany effort with Team Zakspeed. Partnering Robert Haub and coached by Formula Two race winner Kevin Mirocha, the pair achieved two overall podiums and an eighth-place championship finish aboard a Mercedes-AMG GT4. Jílková's career continued to ascend as in 2022 she combined ADAC GT4 and the Pro-Am category of the GT4 European Series, both with Drago Racing Team ZVO. At the end of the year, she was snapped up by the Goa Aces for the new Indian Racing League, earning two podium finishes at the season-ending Hyderabad round and concluding the season in tenth place.

Jílková expanded her horizons in 2023, initially signing for reigning ADAC GT4 champions PROsport Racing before a last-minute opportunity to make her prototype debut arose. Joining Jörg van Ommen's new LMP3 outfit in Prototype Cup Germany, the Czech scored 83 points and a commanding win from pole at Zandvoort with teammate Xavier Lloveras. GT4 remained her secondary programme, as she and Lucile Cypriano emerged as the winners of a female shootout launched by Matmut and Akkodis ASP for an FFSA GT Championship project. The pair shared a Toyota GR Supra and secured third place in the Pro-Am standings. Jílková again saw out the season in India at Madras International Circuit, and was set to become the Indian Racing League's first female winner when Nikhil Bohra spun her round with three corners of the race to go. The victory went to Sarah Moore.

The Matmut Évolution effort became Jílková's main focus in 2024, as she moved back to GT4 Europe with hillclimb convert Cindy Gudet. Although a broken arm for Gudet at Hockenheim thwarted their prospects, the duo bounced back to finish sixth in the Pro-Am standings. Jílková then starred in the Indian Racing League during the winter, setting pole at Chennai, amassing four podiums in five races and helping the Goa Aces win the teams' title. Jílková and Gudet reunited for a second go at GT4 Europe in 2025.

=== Porsche (2023–present) ===
A significant milestone in Jílková's career came in October 2023, testing a GT3 car for the first time for Timo Bernhard's DTM team. Just a week later, she was called up by TAG Heuer Porsche's Formula E outfit to participate in the 2023 Valencia pre-season test as their official rookie driver. She was later named a simulator and development driver for the team, which went on to win the World Drivers' Championship with Pascal Wehrlein.

Jílková enjoyed her second Formula E outing in November 2024, representing the team at the inaugural women's test at Jarama. Soon after, she was hired as an official Porsche contracted driver for 2025. She would return to the 2025 women's test in Valencia with the team.

== Karting record ==
=== Karting career summary ===
Season	Series	Team	Position
2008	ROK International Final - Junior ROK		24th
2009	ROK International Final - Junior ROK		19th
2010	CIK-FIA Karting Academy Trophy	Ceskoslovensky Motorsport	19th
2010	ROK International Final - Junior ROK		3rd
2010	Andrea Margutti Trophy - KF3	DR Srl	32nd
2011	ROK Cup International Final - Senior		7th
2011	CIK-FIA U18 World Karting Championship		32nd
2013	ROK Cup International Final - Senior		6th
2014	ROK Cup International Final - Senior		6th

== Racing record ==
=== Racing career summary ===
Season	Series	Team	Races	Wins	Poles	F/Laps	Podiums	Points	Position
2012	Formula Renault 2.0 Northern European Cup	Krenek Motorsport	3	0	0	0	0	0	53rd
2013	Supercar Challenge Superlights - PR1	Praga Racing Slovakia	2	0	0	0	2	32	9th
2013	Remus Formula Renault 2.0 Cup	Krenek Motorsport	4	0	?	?	3	66	5th
2016	Renault Clio Cup Central Europe	Carpek Service	2	0	0	0	0	25	27th
2019	24H GT Series - GT4	RTR Projects	2	0	0	0	0	0	NC†
2021	GT Winter Series - GTS	Team Zakspeed	6	2	2	0	6	115	**1st**
2021	ADAC GT4 Germany	Team Zakspeed	12	0	0	0	2	95	8th
2021	GT4 European Series - Pro-Am	Team Zakspeed	2	0	0	0	1	0	NC†
2022	ADAC GT4 Germany	Drago Racing Team ZVO	8	0	0	0	0	42	23rd
2022	GT4 European Series - Pro-Am	Drago Racing Team ZVO	7	0	0	0	0	46	10th
2022	Indian Racing League	Goa Aces	5	0	0	0	2	69	10th
2023	Prototype Cup Germany	JvO Racing by Downforce Motorsport; Van Ommen Racing by DataLab	7	1	1	1	2	83	9th
2023	French GT4 Cup - Pro-Am	Matmut Évolution	12	0	0	0	6	135	6th
2023	Indian Racing League	Goa Aces	3	0	0	0	0	42‡	7th‡
2023	GT Winter Series	Van Ommen Racing	?	?	?	?	?	32.5	28th
2023	GT Winter Series	PROsport Racing	?	?	?	?	?	32.5	28th
2023–24	Formula E	TAG Heuer Porsche Formula E Team	Development driver						
2024	GT4 European Series - Pro-Am	TGR Team Matmut Évolution	12	0	0	0	2	74	6th
2024	Indian Racing League	Goa Aces JA Racing	5	0	1	0	4	94‡	5th‡
2024–25	Formula E	TAG Heuer Porsche Formula E Team	Development driver						
2025	GT4 European Series - Pro-Am	TGR Team Matmut Évolution	12	0	0	0	5	103	5th
2025–26	Indian Racing League	Hyderabad Blackbirds	5	0	1	0	0	61	6th
2025–26	Formula E	Porsche Formula E Team	Development driver						

† As Jílková was a guest driver, she was ineligible for points.
‡ Entrant standings.
^{*} Season still in progress.

=== Complete Formula Renault 2.0 NEC results ===
(key) (Races in bold indicate pole position) (Races in italics indicate fastest lap)

Year	Entrant	1	2	3	4	5	6	7	8	9	10	11	12	13	14	15	16	17	18	19	20	DC	Points
2012	Krenek Motorsport	HOC; 1	HOC; 2	HOC; 3	NÜR; 1	NÜR; 2	OSC; 1	OSC; 2	OSC; 3	ASS; 1	ASS; 2	RBR; 1	RBR; 2	MST; 1 Ret	MST; 2 Ret	MST; 3; 27	ZAN; 1	ZAN; 2	ZAN; 3	SPA; 1	SPA; 2	53rd	0

=== Complete GT4 European Series results ===
(key) (Races in bold indicate pole position) (Races in italics indicate fastest lap)

Year	Team	Car	Class	1	2	3	4	5	6	7	8	9	10	11	12	Pos	Points
2021	Team Zakspeed	Mercedes-AMG GT4	Pro-Am	MNZ; 1	MNZ; 2	LEC; 1	LEC; 2	ZAN; 1	ZAN; 2	SPA; 1	SPA; 2	NÜR; 1; 21	NÜR; 2; 10	CAT; 1	CAT; 2	NC†	0
2022	Drago Racing Team ZVO	Mercedes-AMG GT4	Pro-Am	IMO; 1; 12	IMO; 2; 11	LEC; 1; 12	LEC; 2; 15	MIS; 1; 9	MIS; 2; 27	SPA; 1 DNS	SPA; 2; 11	HOC; 1	HOC; 2	CAT; 1	CAT; 2	10th	46
2024	TGR Team Matmut Évolution	Toyota GR Supra GT4 Evo	Pro-Am	LEC; 1; 16	LEC; 2; 25	MIS; 1; 19	MIS; 2 Ret	SPA; 1; 18	SPA; 2; 25	HOC; 1 Ret	HOC; 2 Ret	MNZ; 1; 31	MNZ; 2; 24	JED; 1; 17	JED; 2; 19	6th	74
2025	TGR Team Matmut Évolution	Toyota GR Supra GT4 Evo2	Pro-Am	LEC; 1; 28	LEC; 2; 15	ZAN; 1; 38†	ZAN; 2; 15	SPA; 1	SPA; 2	MIS; 1	MIS; 2	NÜR; 1	NÜR; 2	CAT; 1	CAT; 2	6th*	29*

=== Complete Indian Racing League results ===
(key) (Races in bold indicate pole position) (Races in italics indicate fastest lap)

Year	Franchise	1	2	3	4	5	6	7	8	9	10	11	12	Pos.	Pts
2022	Goa Aces	HYD1; 1 C	HYD1; 2 C	HYD1; 3 C	CHE1; 1 Ret	CHE1; 2	CHE1; 3 DNS	CHE2; 1; 7	CHE2; 2	CHE2; 3; 7	HYD2; 1; 2	HYD2; 2	HYD2; 3; 2	10th	69
2023‡	Goa Aces	MIC1; 1	MIC1; 2; 7	MIC2; 1; 6	MIC2; 2	MIC3; 1; 4	MIC3; 2							7th	42
2024‡	Goa Aces JA Racing	MIC1; 1	MIC1; 2; 3	**CHE**; **1**; 2	CHE; 2	MIC2; 1; 2	MIC2; 2	KAR1; 1	KAR1; 2; 7	KAR2; 1	KAR2; 2; 2			5th	94

‡ Standings based on entrant points, not individual drivers.

=== Complete Prototype Cup Germany results ===
(key) (Races in bold indicate pole position) (Races in italics indicate fastest lap)

Year	Team	Car	Engine	1	2	3	4	5	6	7	8	9	10	11	12	DC	Points
2023	JvO Racing by Downforce Motorsport Van Ommen Racing by DataLab	Duqueine M30 - D08	Nissan VK56DE 5.6 L V8	HOC; 1; 5	HOC; 2; 4	OSC; 1; 6	OSC; 2 Ret	ZAN; 1; 3	**ZAN**; **2**; 1	NOR; 1	NOR; 2	ASS; 1; 8	ASS; 2 DNS	NÜR; 1	NÜR; 2	9th	83
