= 2022 GT4 European Series =

The 2022 GT4 European Series was the fifteenth season of the GT4 European Series, a Sports car racing championship organised by Stéphane Ratel Organisation (SRO). The season began at Imola on 1 April, and ended at the Circuit de Barcelona-Catalunya on 30 September.

== Calendar ==
The 2022 calendar was announced via the website on 4 September 2021.

Round	Circuit	Date	Supporting	Invitational
1	Imola Circuit, Imola, Italy	1–3 April	GT World Challenge Europe Endurance Cup	
2	Circuit Paul Ricard, Le Castellet, France	3–5 June	GT World Challenge Europe Endurance Cup	GT4 Scandinavia
3	Misano World Circuit, Misano, Italy	1–3 July	GT World Challenge Sprint Cup	
4	Circuit de Spa-Francorchamps, Stavelot, Belgium	28–31 July	GT World Challenge Europe Endurance Cup	
5	Hockenheimring, Hockenheim, Germany	2–4 September	GT World Challenge Europe Endurance Cup	
6	Circuit de Barcelona-Catalunya, Montmeló, Spain	30 September–2 October	GT World Challenge Europe Endurance Cup	

== Entry list ==
The full season entry list was released on 23 March and contained 50 cars.

Team	Car	No.	Drivers	Class	Rounds
(Switzerland) Hofor Racing by Bonk Motorsport	BMW M4 GT4	2	(Italy) Gabriele Piana	S	4–5
(Switzerland) Hofor Racing by Bonk Motorsport	BMW M4 GT4	2	(Germany) Michael Schrey	S	4–5
(France) Team Speedcar	Audi R8 LMS GT4 Evo	3	(France) Robert Consani	S	All
(France) Team Speedcar	Audi R8 LMS GT4 Evo	3	(France) Benjamin Lariche	S	All
(Germany) Drago Racing Team ZVO	Mercedes-AMG GT4	4	(Germany) Robert Haub	PA	All
(Germany) Drago Racing Team ZVO	Mercedes-AMG GT4	4	(Czech Republic) Gabriela Jílková	PA	1–4
(Germany) Drago Racing Team ZVO	Mercedes-AMG GT4	4	(France) Théo Nouet	PA	5–6
(Germany) / Team Spirit Racing (Note: Cars No. 5 and No. 18 entered as Team Spirit Racing and Cars No. 6 and No. 9 entered as Hella Pagid - racing one); (Germany) / Hella Pagid - racing one	Aston Martin Vantage AMR GT4	5	(United States) Kenton Koch	S	1–4
(Germany) / Team Spirit Racing; (Germany) / Hella Pagid - racing one	Aston Martin Vantage AMR GT4	5	(Netherlands) Thijmen Nabuurs	S	1–4
(Germany) / Team Spirit Racing; (Germany) / Hella Pagid - racing one	Aston Martin Vantage AMR GT4	5	(Germany) Nico Hantke	S	5
(Germany) / Team Spirit Racing; (Germany) / Hella Pagid - racing one	Aston Martin Vantage AMR GT4	5	(United Kingdom) Will Tregurtha	S	5
(Germany) / Team Spirit Racing; (Germany) / Hella Pagid - racing one	Aston Martin Vantage AMR GT4	6	(Germany) Moritz Gisy	S	2, 4–5
(Germany) / Team Spirit Racing; (Germany) / Hella Pagid - racing one	Aston Martin Vantage AMR GT4	6	(Germany) Vincent Gisy	S	2, 4
(Germany) / Team Spirit Racing; (Germany) / Hella Pagid - racing one	Aston Martin Vantage AMR GT4	6	(Germany) Ralf Kelleners	S	5
(Germany) / Team Spirit Racing; (Germany) / Hella Pagid - racing one	Aston Martin Vantage AMR GT4	9	(Germany) Christian Gisy	PA	1–2, 4, 6
(Germany) / Team Spirit Racing; (Germany) / Hella Pagid - racing one	Aston Martin Vantage AMR GT4	9	(Germany) Vincent Gisy	PA	1
(Germany) / Team Spirit Racing; (Germany) / Hella Pagid - racing one	Aston Martin Vantage AMR GT4	9	(Germany) Ralf Kelleners	PA	2, 4, 6
(Germany) / Team Spirit Racing; (Germany) / Hella Pagid - racing one	Aston Martin Vantage AMR GT4	18	(Germany) Markus Lungstrass	Am	All
(Germany) / Team Spirit Racing; (Germany) / Hella Pagid - racing one	Aston Martin Vantage AMR GT4	18	(Denmark) Henrik Lyngbye Pedersen	Am	All
(France) AGS Events	Aston Martin Vantage AMR GT4	7	(France) Noah Andy	S	1–4
(France) AGS Events	Aston Martin Vantage AMR GT4	7	(France) Hugo Conde	S	1–4
(France) AGS Events	Aston Martin Vantage AMR GT4	7	(France) Mike Parisy	PA	5–6
(France) AGS Events	Aston Martin Vantage AMR GT4	7	(France) Nicolas Gomar	PA	5–6
(France) AGS Events	Aston Martin Vantage AMR GT4	80	(United Kingdom) Ruben del Sarte	PA	1–4
(France) AGS Events	Aston Martin Vantage AMR GT4	80	(France) Tom Verdier	PA	1–4
(France) AGS Events	Aston Martin Vantage AMR GT4	80	(France) Loris Cabirou	S	5–6
(France) AGS Events	Aston Martin Vantage AMR GT4	80	(France) Tom Verdier	S	5–6
(France) AGS Events	Aston Martin Vantage AMR GT4	89	(France) Wilfried Cazalbon	Am	All
(France) AGS Events	Aston Martin Vantage AMR GT4	89	(France) Julien Lambert	Am	All
(France) TGR CMR	Toyota GR Supra GT4	8	(France) Etienne Cheli	S	All
(France) TGR CMR	Toyota GR Supra GT4	8	(France) Corentin Surand	S	All
(France) TGR CMR	Toyota GR Supra GT4	66	(France) Romain Monti	S	All
(France) TGR CMR	Toyota GR Supra GT4	66	(Belgium) Antoine Potty	S	All
(Switzerland) Racing Spirit of Léman	Aston Martin Vantage AMR GT4	10	(United Kingdom) Gus Bowers	S	All
(Switzerland) Racing Spirit of Léman	Aston Martin Vantage AMR GT4	10	(Switzerland) Konstantin Lachenauer	S	All
(Switzerland) Racing Spirit of Léman	Aston Martin Vantage AMR GT4	19	(United Kingdom) Tom Canning	S	All
(Switzerland) Racing Spirit of Léman	Aston Martin Vantage AMR GT4	19	(India) Akhil Rabindra	S	All
(Turkey) Borusan Otomotiv Motorsport	BMW M4 GT4	11	(Turkey) Yağız Gedik	PA	All
(Turkey) Borusan Otomotiv Motorsport	BMW M4 GT4	11	(Turkey) Jason Tahincioğlu	PA	All
(Turkey) Borusan Otomotiv Motorsport	BMW M4 GT4	12	(Turkey) Berkay Besler	S	All
(Turkey) Borusan Otomotiv Motorsport	BMW M4 GT4	12	(United Kingdom) William Burns	S	All
(France) Arkadia Racing	Alpine A110 GT4	13	(France) Pierre-Louis Chovet	S	1
(France) Arkadia Racing	Alpine A110 GT4	13	(France) Johan Boris Scheier	S	1
(France) Arkadia Racing	Alpine A110 GT4	13	(France) Franck Chahinian	Am	2
(France) Arkadia Racing	Alpine A110 GT4	13	(France) Olivier Forzano	Am	2
(France) Arkadia Racing	Alpine A110 GT4	63	(France) Pierre-Laurent Figuiere	PA	1–4
(France) Arkadia Racing	Alpine A110 GT4	63	(France) Thomas Martinez	PA	1–2
(France) Arkadia Racing	Alpine A110 GT4	63	(France) Johan Boris Scheier	PA	3
(France) Arkadia Racing	Alpine A110 GT4	63	(France) Pierre-Laurent Figuiere	Am	6
(France) Arkadia Racing	Alpine A110 GT4	63	(France) Franck Chahinian	Am	6
(France) Saintéloc Racing	Audi R8 LMS GT4 Evo	14	(France) Erwan Bastard	S	All
(France) Saintéloc Racing	Audi R8 LMS GT4 Evo	14	(United States) Roee Meyuhas	S	All
(France) Saintéloc Racing	Audi R8 LMS GT4 Evo	21	(France) Anthony Beltoise	PA	1–3
(France) Saintéloc Racing	Audi R8 LMS GT4 Evo	21	(France) Olivier Esteves	PA	1–3
(France) Saintéloc Racing	Audi R8 LMS GT4 Evo	27	(France) Gregory Faessel Curson	PA	2, 4, 6
(France) Saintéloc Racing	Audi R8 LMS GT4 Evo	27	(France) Adrien Tambay	PA	2
(France) Saintéloc Racing	Audi R8 LMS GT4 Evo	42	(France) Grégory Guilvert	PA	All
(France) Saintéloc Racing	Audi R8 LMS GT4 Evo	42	(France) Fabien Michal	PA	All
(Spain) NM Racing Team	Mercedes-AMG GT4	15	(Spain) Lluc Ibáñez	S	All
(Spain) NM Racing Team	Mercedes-AMG GT4	15	(France) Enzo Joulié	S	All
(Spain) NM Racing Team	Mercedes-AMG GT4	51	(Czech Republic) Jakub Knoll	PA	All
(Spain) NM Racing Team	Mercedes-AMG GT4	51	(Spain) Filip Vava	PA	All
(Spain) NM Racing Team	Mercedes-AMG GT4	88	(Fédération Internationale de l'Automobile) Stanislav Safronov (Note: Aleksandr Vaintrub, Stanislav Safronov, Andrey Solukvtsev and Mikhail Loboda are Russian, but compete as a neutral competitors using the Fédération Internationale de l'Automobile flag as Belarusian and Russian national emblems were banned by the association due to the Russian invasion of Ukraine.)	Am	All
(Spain) NM Racing Team	Mercedes-AMG GT4	88	(Fédération Internationale de l'Automobile) Aleksandr Vaintrub	Am	All
(Netherlands) V8 Racing	Chevrolet Camaro GT4.R	17	(Belgium) Kenny Herremans	PA	All
(Netherlands) V8 Racing	Chevrolet Camaro GT4.R	17	(Netherlands) Dante Rappange	PA	All
(Germany) Allied Racing	Porsche 718 Cayman GT4 Clubsport MR1; Porsche 718 Cayman GT4 RS Clubsport 2	22	(Germany) Vincent Andronaco	PA	All
(Germany) Allied Racing	Porsche 718 Cayman GT4 Clubsport MR1; Porsche 718 Cayman GT4 RS Clubsport 2	22	(Germany) Andreas Mayrl	PA	All
(Germany) Allied Racing	Porsche 718 Cayman GT4 Clubsport MR1; Porsche 718 Cayman GT4 RS Clubsport 2	44	(Denmark) Alexander Hartvig	S	All
(Germany) Allied Racing	Porsche 718 Cayman GT4 Clubsport MR1; Porsche 718 Cayman GT4 RS Clubsport 2	44	(Germany) Moritz Wiskirchen	S	All
(Germany) PROsport Racing	Aston Martin Vantage AMR GT4	24	(Germany) Mike David Ortmann	S	All
(Germany) PROsport Racing	Aston Martin Vantage AMR GT4	24	(Germany) Hugo Sasse	S	All
(Germany) PROsport Racing	Aston Martin Vantage AMR GT4	25	(Belgium) Rodrigue Gillion	PA	All
(Germany) PROsport Racing	Aston Martin Vantage AMR GT4	25	(Belgium) Nico Verdonck	PA	All
(France) Team Fullmotorsport	Audi R8 LMS GT4 Evo	26	(France) Benoit Lison	Am	All
(France) Team Fullmotorsport	Audi R8 LMS GT4 Evo	26	(France) Cyril Saleilles	Am	All
(France) Team Fullmotorsport	Audi R8 LMS GT4 Evo	67	(Spain) Marc López	S	All
(France) Team Fullmotorsport	Audi R8 LMS GT4 Evo	67	(France) Jeremie Lesoudier	S	1–2, 4
(France) Team Fullmotorsport	Audi R8 LMS GT4 Evo	67	(France) Sacha Bottemane	S	3, 5–6
(France) Team Fullmotorsport	Audi R8 LMS GT4 Evo	69	(France) Michael Blanchemain	Am	All
(France) Team Fullmotorsport	Audi R8 LMS GT4 Evo	69	(France) Christophe Hamon	Am	All
(France) Mirage Racing	Alpine A110 GT4	28	(France) Frédéric de Brabant	Am	All
(France) Mirage Racing	Alpine A110 GT4	28	(France) Alban Lagrange	Am	All
(France) Mirage Racing	Alpine A110 GT4	29	(France) Vincent Beltoise	S	1–2
(France) Mirage Racing	Alpine A110 GT4	29	(France) Mateo Herrero	S	1–2
(France) Mirage Racing	Aston Martin Vantage AMR GT4	58	(United Kingdom) Ruben del Sarte	S	5–6
(France) Mirage Racing	Aston Martin Vantage AMR GT4	58	(Germany) Paul-Aurel König	S	5
(France) Mirage Racing	Aston Martin Vantage AMR GT4	58	(United Kingdom) Jamie Day	S	6
(Belgium) Selleslagh Racing Team	Mercedes-AMG GT4	32	(Belgium) Jean-Luc Behets	Am	1–4
(Belgium) Selleslagh Racing Team	Mercedes-AMG GT4	32	(Belgium) Johan Vannerum	Am	1–4
(Belgium) Selleslagh Racing Team	Mercedes-AMG GT4	32	(Belgium) Arthur Peters	S	6
(Belgium) Selleslagh Racing Team	Mercedes-AMG GT4	32	(Belgium) Stéphane Lémeret	S	6
(Belgium) Selleslagh Racing Team	Mercedes-AMG GT4	34	(United States) Alexandre Papadopulos	S	All
(Belgium) Selleslagh Racing Team	Mercedes-AMG GT4	34	(France) Luca Bosco	S	1–3
(Belgium) Selleslagh Racing Team	Mercedes-AMG GT4	34	(Netherlands) Olivier Hart	S	4
(Belgium) Selleslagh Racing Team	Mercedes-AMG GT4	34	(Belgium) Marnik Battryn	S	5–6
(France) Code Racing Development	Alpine A110 GT4	36	(France) Antoine Leclerc	PA	All
(France) Code Racing Development	Alpine A110 GT4	36	(Switzerland) Loïc Villiger	PA	All
(Germany) W&S Motorsport	Porsche 718 Cayman GT4 Clubsport MR1; Porsche 718 Cayman GT4 RS Clubsport 2	37	(Fédération Internationale de l'Automobile) Mikhail Loboda	Am	All
(Germany) W&S Motorsport	Porsche 718 Cayman GT4 Clubsport MR1; Porsche 718 Cayman GT4 RS Clubsport 2	37	(Fédération Internationale de l'Automobile) Andrey Solukvtsev	Am	All
(Germany) W&S Motorsport	Porsche 718 Cayman GT4 Clubsport MR1; Porsche 718 Cayman GT4 RS Clubsport 2	38	(Germany) Max Kronberg	PA	All
(Germany) W&S Motorsport	Porsche 718 Cayman GT4 Clubsport MR1; Porsche 718 Cayman GT4 RS Clubsport 2	38	(Germany) Hendrik Still	PA	All
(United Kingdom) Greystone GT	McLaren 570S GT4	47	(United Kingdom) Adam Carroll	PA	All
(United Kingdom) Greystone GT	McLaren 570S GT4	47	(United Kingdom) Tim Whale	PA	All
(United Kingdom) Greystone GT	McLaren 570S GT4	60	(Germany) Richard Distl	PA	3, 6
(United Kingdom) Greystone GT	McLaren 570S GT4	60	(Switzerland) Alain Valente	PA	3, 6
(San Marino) W&D Racing Team	BMW M4 GT4	50	(San Marino) Paolo Meloni	Am	All
(San Marino) W&D Racing Team	BMW M4 GT4	50	(Italy) Massimiliano Tresoldi	Am	All
(France) AKKodis ASP Team	Mercedes-AMG GT4	53	(France) Christophe Bourret	Am	All
(France) AKKodis ASP Team	Mercedes-AMG GT4	53	(France) Pascal Gibon	Am	All
(France) AKKodis ASP Team	Mercedes-AMG GT4	61	(Belgium) Mauro Ricci	Am	All
(France) AKKodis ASP Team	Mercedes-AMG GT4	61	(Belgium) Benjamin Ricci	Am	1–5
(France) AKKodis ASP Team	Mercedes-AMG GT4	61	(France) Fabien Barthez	Am	6
(France) AKKodis ASP Team	Mercedes-AMG GT4	81	(France) Eric Debard	PA	1–4, 6
(France) AKKodis ASP Team	Mercedes-AMG GT4	81	(France) Simon Gachet	PA	1–4, 6
(France) AKKodis ASP Team	Mercedes-AMG GT4	87	(France) Jean-Luc Beaubelique	PA	All
(France) AKKodis ASP Team	Mercedes-AMG GT4	87	(France) Jim Pla	PA	All
(France) Autosport GP	Alpine A110 GT4	55	(France) Laurent Hurgon	PA	All
(France) Autosport GP	Alpine A110 GT4	55	(France) Jean-Baptiste Mela	PA	All
(France) Autosport GP	Alpine A110 GT4	110	(France) Simon Tirman	S	All
(France) Autosport GP	Alpine A110 GT4	110	(France) Pierre Sancinena	S	1–5
(France) Autosport GP	Alpine A110 GT4	110	(France) Paul Cauhaupé	S	6
(France) GPA Racing	Aston Martin Vantage AMR GT4	72	(France) Florent Grizaud	Am	6
(France) GPA Racing	Aston Martin Vantage AMR GT4	72	(France) Kévin Jimenez	Am	6
(France) Bodemer Auto	Alpine A110 GT4	76	(France) Grégoire Demoustier	PA	1
(France) Bodemer Auto	Alpine A110 GT4	76	(France) Jean Charles Rédélé	PA	1
(Spain) McLaren Barcelona - Grupo Hafesa	McLaren 570S GT4	119	(Spain) Gonzalo De Andres Martin	PA	1
(Spain) McLaren Barcelona - Grupo Hafesa	McLaren 570S GT4	119	(Spain) Fernando Navarrete Rodrigo	PA	1
(France) JSB Compétition	Alpine A110 GT4	138	(France) Julien Briché	PA	All
(France) JSB Compétition	Alpine A110 GT4	138	(France) Jean-Laurent Navarro	PA	All
(Sweden) Eken Motorsport	Mercedes-AMG GT4	208	(Sweden) Per Andersson	Am	4
(Sweden) Eken Motorsport	Mercedes-AMG GT4	208	(Sweden) Fredrik Danner	Am	4
(Sweden) Eken Motorsport	Mercedes-AMG GT4	217	(Sweden) Nicklas Johansson	PA	4
(Sweden) Eken Motorsport	Mercedes-AMG GT4	217	(Sweden) Mats Ek Tidstrand	PA	4
(Sweden) RMS	Mercedes-AMG GT4	221	(Sweden) Håkan Ricknäs	Am	4
(Sweden) RMS	Mercedes-AMG GT4	221	(Sweden) Calle Ward	Am	4
Toyota Gazoo Racing Sweden	Toyota GR Supra GT4	229	(Sweden) Hans Holmlund	PA	4
Toyota Gazoo Racing Sweden	Toyota GR Supra GT4	229	(Sweden) Emil Skärås	PA	4
Toyota Gazoo Racing Sweden	Toyota GR Supra GT4	255	(Sweden) Tommy Gråberg	Am	4
Toyota Gazoo Racing Sweden	Toyota GR Supra GT4	255	(New Zealand) Harry McDonald	Am	4
(Sweden) Race Team Gelleråsen by AFR	Porsche 718 Cayman GT4 RS Clubsport	278	(Sweden) Gustav Bard	Am	4
(Sweden) Race Team Gelleråsen by AFR	Porsche 718 Cayman GT4 RS Clubsport	278	(Sweden) Patrik Skoog	Am	4
(Sweden) ALFAB Racing	McLaren 570S GT4	288	(Sweden) Erik Behrens	PA	4
(Sweden) ALFAB Racing	McLaren 570S GT4	288	(Sweden) Daniel Roos	PA	4
(Sweden) M-Bilar Racing	BMW M4 GT4	298	(Sweden) Victor Bouveng	PA	4
(Sweden) M-Bilar Racing	BMW M4 GT4	298	(Sweden) Joakim Walde	PA	4
(Switzerland) Centri Porsche Ticino	Porsche 718 Cayman GT4 Clubsport MR 1 Porsche 718 Cayman GT4 RS Clubsport 2	718	(Switzerland) Alex Fontana	PA	All
(Switzerland) Centri Porsche Ticino	Porsche 718 Cayman GT4 Clubsport MR 1 Porsche 718 Cayman GT4 RS Clubsport 2	718	(Switzerland) Ivan Jacoma	PA	All
Entrylists:

Icon	Class
S	Silver Cup
PA	Pro-Am Cup
Am	Am Cup

== Race calendar and results ==
Bold indicates the overall winner.

Round		Circuit	Date	Pole position	Silver Winners	Pro-Am Winners	Am Winners	GT4 Scandinavia Pro-Am Winners	GT4 Scandinavia Am Winners
1	R1	(Italy) Imola	2 April	(Germany) No. 22 Allied Racing	(Switzerland) **No. 10 Racing Spirit of Léman**	(Germany) No. 22 Allied Racing	(France) No. 69 Team Fullmotorsport	No Entries	No Entries
1	R1	(Italy) Imola	2 April	(Germany) Vincent Andronaco (Germany) Andreas Mayrl	**(United Kingdom) Gus Bowers** **(Switzerland) Konstantin Lachenauer**	(Germany) Vincent Andronaco (Germany) Andreas Mayrl	(France) Michael Blanchemain (France) Christophe Hamon	No Entries	No Entries
1	R2	(Italy) Imola	3 April	(Switzerland) No. 10 Racing Spirit of Léman	(Switzerland) **No. 10 Racing Spirit of Léman**	(Switzerland) No. 718 Centri Porsche Ticino	(France) No. 89 AGS Events	No Entries	No Entries
1	R2	(Italy) Imola	3 April	(United Kingdom) Gus Bowers (Switzerland) Konstantin Lachenauer	**(United Kingdom) Gus Bowers** **(Switzerland) Konstantin Lachenauer**	(Switzerland) Alex Fontana (Switzerland) Ivan Jacoma	(France) Wilfried Cazalbon (France) Julien Lambert	No Entries	No Entries
2	R1	(France) Paul Ricard	4 June	(France) No. 81 AKKodis ASP Team	(Germany) **No. 24 PROsport Racing**	(France) No. 87 AKKodis ASP Team	(Spain) No. 88 NM Racing Team	No Entries	No Entries
2	R1	(France) Paul Ricard	4 June	(France) Eric Debard (France) Simon Gachet	**(Germany) Mike David Ortmann** **(Germany) Hugo Sasse**	(France) Jean Luc Beaubelique (France) Jim Pla	(Fédération Internationale de l'Automobile) Stanislav Safronov (Fédération Internationale de l'Automobile) Aleksandr Vaintrub	No Entries	No Entries
2	R2	(France) Paul Ricard	5 June	(Spain) No. 15 NM Racing Team	(Germany) **No. 24 PROsport Racing**	(Netherlands) No. 17 V8 Racing	(France) No. 89 AGS Events	No Entries	No Entries
2	R2	(France) Paul Ricard	5 June	(Spain) Lluc Ibáñez (France) Enzo Joulié	**(Germany) Mike David Ortmann** **(Germany) Hugo Sasse**	(Belgium) Kenny Herremans (Netherlands) Dante Rappange	(France) Wilfried Cazalbon (France) Julien Lambert	No Entries	No Entries
3	R1	(Italy) Misano	2 July	(Spain) No. 15 NM Racing Team	(Spain) No. 15 NM Racing Team	(France) **No. 87 AKKodis ASP Team**	(France) No. 61 AKKodis ASP Team	No Entries	No Entries
3	R1	(Italy) Misano	2 July	(Spain) Lluc Ibáñez (France) Enzo Joulié	(Spain) Lluc Ibáñez (France) Enzo Joulié	**(France) Jean Luc Beaubelique** **(France) Jim Pla**	(Belgium) Mauro Ricci (Belgium) Benjamin Ricci	No Entries	No Entries
3	R2	(Italy) Misano	3 July	(Spain) No. 15 NM Racing Team	(Spain) **No. 15 NM Racing Team**	(France) No. 36 Code Racing Development	(France) No. 61 AKKodis ASP Team	No Entries	No Entries
3	R2	(Italy) Misano	3 July	(Spain) Lluc Ibáñez (France) Enzo Joulié	**(Spain) Lluc Ibáñez** **(France) Enzo Joulié**	(France) Antoine Leclerc (Switzerland) Loïc Villiger	(Belgium) Mauro Ricci (Belgium) Benjamin Ricci	No Entries	No Entries
4	R1	(Belgium) Spa-Francorchamps	29 July	(France) No. 36 Code Racing Development	(France) No. 66 TGR CMR	**(France) No. 36 Code Racing Development**	(Germany) No. 37 W&S Motorsport	(Sweden) No. 288 ALFAB Racing	(Sweden) No. 221 RMS
4	R1	(Belgium) Spa-Francorchamps	29 July	(France) Antoine Leclerc (Switzerland) Loïc Villiger	(France) Romain Monti (Belgium) Antoine Potty	**(France) Antoine Leclerc** **(Switzerland) Loïc Villiger**	(Fédération Internationale de l'Automobile) Mikhail Loboda (Fédération Internationale de l'Automobile) Andrey Solukvtsev	(Sweden) Erik Behrens (Sweden) Daniel Roos	(Sweden) Håkan Ricknäs (Sweden) Calle Ward
4	R2	(Belgium) Spa-Francorchamps	30 July	(France) No. 110 Autosport GP	**(France) No. 14 Saintéloc Racing**	(France) No. 42 Saintéloc Racing	(France) No. 27 Saintéloc Racing	Toyota Gazoo Racing Sweden	(Sweden) No. 221 RMS
4	R2	(Belgium) Spa-Francorchamps	30 July	(France) Pierre Sancinena (France) Simon Tirman	**(France) Erwan Bastard** **(United States) Roee Meyuhas**	(France) Grégory Guilvert (France) Fabien Michal	(France) Gregory Faessel Curson	(Sweden) Hans Holmlund (Sweden) Emil Skärås	(Sweden) Håkan Ricknäs (Sweden) Calle Ward
5	R1	(Germany) Hockenheim	3 September	(France) No. 3 Team Speedcar	(Spain) **No. 15 NM Racing Team**	(France) No. 87 AKKodis ASP Team	(Germany) No. 37 W&S Motorsport	No Entries	No Entries
5	R1	(Germany) Hockenheim	3 September	(France) Robert Consani (France) Benjamin Lariche	**(Spain) Lluc Ibáñez** **(France) Enzo Joulié**	(France) Jean Luc Beaubelique (France) Jim Pla	(Fédération Internationale de l'Automobile) Mikhail Loboda (Fédération Internationale de l'Automobile) Andrey Solukvtsev	No Entries	No Entries
5	R2	(Germany) Hockenheim	4 September	(France) No. 14 Saintéloc Racing	**(France) No. 14 Saintéloc Racing**	(France) No. 42 Saintéloc Racing	(Germany) No. 37 W&S Motorsport	No Entries	No Entries
5	R2	(Germany) Hockenheim	4 September	(France) Erwan Bastard (United States) Roee Meyuhas	**(France) Erwan Bastard** **(United States) Roee Meyuhas**	(France) Grégory Guilvert (France) Fabien Michal	(Fédération Internationale de l'Automobile) Mikhail Loboda (Fédération Internationale de l'Automobile) Andrey Solukvtsev	No Entries	No Entries
6	R1	(Spain) Barcelona	1 October	(Germany) No. 22 Allied Racing	(France) No. 14 Saintéloc Racing	**(Germany) No. 22 Allied Racing**	(France) No. 69 Team Fullmotorsport	No Entries	No Entries
6	R1	(Spain) Barcelona	1 October	(Germany) Vincent Andronaco (Germany) Andreas Mayrl	(France) Erwan Bastard (United States) Roee Meyuhas	**(Germany) Vincent Andronaco** **(Germany) Andreas Mayrl**	(France) Michael Blanchemain (France) Christophe Hamon	No Entries	No Entries
6	R2	(Spain) Barcelona	2 October	(Germany) No. 44 Allied Racing	(Germany) No. 24 PROsport Racing	**(Netherlands) No. 17 V8 Racing**	(France) No. 69 Team Fullmotorsport	No Entries	No Entries
6	R2	(Spain) Barcelona	2 October	(Denmark) Alexander Hartvig (Germany) Moritz Wiskirchen	(Germany) Mike David Ortmann (Germany) Hugo Sasse	**(Belgium) Kenny Herremans** **(Netherlands) Dante Rappange**	(France) Michael Blanchemain (France) Christophe Hamon	No Entries	No Entries

== Championship standings ==
Scoring system

Championship points were awarded for the first ten positions in each race. The drivers of the car setting the fastest time in the Silver, Pro-Am and Am Cups in Q1 and Q2 individually will be awarded one point. Entries were required to complete 75% of the winning car's race distance in order to be classified and earn points. Individual drivers were required to participate for a minimum of 25 minutes in order to earn championship points in any race.

Race-by-race entrants must compete in at least one of the first four races if they wish to score points in the final two races.

Position	**1st**	**2nd**	**3rd**	**4th**	**5th**	**6th**	**7th**	**8th**	**9th**	**10th**	**Pole**
Points	25	18	15	12	10	8	6	4	2	1	1

=== Drivers' championship ===
Pos.	Drivers	Team	IMO (Italy)		LEC (France)		MIS (Italy)		SPA (Belgium)		HOC (Germany)		CAT (Spain)		Points
Silver Cup
1	(United States) Roee Meyuhas (France) Erwan Bastard	(France) Saintéloc Racing	4	4	23	21	32	11	3	1	8	**1**	2	8	159
2	(Spain) Lluc Ibáñez (France) Enzo Joulié	(Spain) NM Racing Team	38	24	3	**3**	**10**	**1**	5	3	1	28	8	13	156
3	(Germany) Mike David Ortmann (Germany) Hugo Sasse	(Germany) PROsport Racing	Ret	DNS	1	1	14	DNS	16	2	2	18	5	2	142
4	(United Kingdom) Gus Bowers (Switzerland) Kostantin Lachenauer	(Switzerland) Racing Spirit of Léman	1	**1**	4	2	34†	37†	11	27	11	Ret	10	14	109
5	(Turkey) Berkay Besler (United Kingdom) William Burns	(Turkey) Borusan Ottomotiv Motorsport	9	10	Ret	7	16	9	4	21	28	7	3	5	108
6	(France) Romain Monti (Belgium) Antoine Potty	(France) TGR CMR	41†	7	**2**	19	Ret	3	2	14	29	5	DNS	3	106
7	(France) Robert Consani (France) Benjamin Lariche	(France) Team Speedcar	WD	WD	Ret	4	13	22	7	8	**4**	2	12	10	95
8	(United Kingdom) Tom Canning (India) Akhil Rabindra	(Switzerland) Racing Spirit of Léman	6	5	5	8	15	10	14	10	12	8	39†	28	88
9	(Denmark) Alexander Hartvig (Germany) Moritz Wiskirchen	(Germany) Allied Racing	Ret	9	17	44†	24	2	15	Ret	Ret	3	**18**	**40**	60
10	(United States) Kenton Koch (Netherlands) Thijmen Nabuurs	(Germany) Team Spirit Racing	39	Ret	15	6	17	12	**Ret**	7					43
11	(Italy) Gabriele Piana (Germany) Michael Schrey	(Switzerland) Hofor Racing by Bonk Motorsport							6	4	3	Ret			37
12	(France) Simon Tirman	(France) Autosport GP	11	39	18	9	18	17	10	**32**	27	14	6	Ret	35
12	(France) Pierre Sancinena	(France) Autosport GP	11	39	18	9	18	17	10	**32**	27	14			35
13	(United Kingdom) Ruben del Sarte	(France) AGS Events	40†	15	22	43†	27	31	Ret	Ret					31
13	(United Kingdom) Ruben del Sarte	(France) Mirage Racing									20	9	13	12	31
14	(Spain) Marc López	(France) Team Fullmotorsport	26	23	33	34	25	4	43	31	15	31	24	39	27
15	(United States) Alexandre Papadopulos	(Belgium) Selleslagh Racing Team	14	22	37	11	Ret	18	28	34	35	12	20	20	23
16	(France) Sacha Bottemane	(France) Team Fullmotorsport					25	4			15	31	24	39	19
17	(France) Luca Bosco	(Belgium) Selleslagh Racing Team	14	22	37	11	Ret	18							15
18	(United Kingdom) Jamie Day	(France) Mirage Racing											13	12	14
19	(France) Tom Verdier	(France) AGS Events	40†	15	22	43†	27	31	Ret	Ret	30	30	DNS	DNS	10
20	(France) Jeremie Lesoudier	(France) Team Fullmotorsport	26	23	33	34			43	31					8
21	(Belgium) Marnik Battryn	(Belgium) Selleslagh Racing Team									35	12	20	20	8
22	(Germany) Paul-Aurel König	(France) Mirage Racing									20	9			7
23	(Germany) Nico Hantke (United Kingdom) Will Tregurtha	(Germany) Team Spirit Racing									16	19			2
24	(France) Pierre-Louis Chovet (France) Johan Boris Scheier	(France) Arkadia Racing	**DSQ**	45†											1
25	(France) Noah Andy (France) Hugo Condé	(France) AGS Events	Ret	36	Ret	33	Ret	35†	Ret	22					1
Pro-Am Cup
1	(France) Jean-Luc Beaubelique (France) Jim Pla	(France) AKKodis ASP Team	3	12	6	10	**1**	6	17	18	5	23	27	24	153
2	(Belgium) Kenny Herremans (Netherlands) Dante Rappange	(Netherlands) V8 Racing	18	13	8	**5**	4	**13**	19	12	10	29	7	1	145
3	(France) Grégory Guilvert (France) Fabien Michal	(France) Saintéloc Racing	24	2	9	6	2	6	3	1	36†	1	4	**5**	142
4	(Switzerland) Alex Fontana (Switzerland) Ivan Jacoma	(Switzerland) Centri Porsche Ticino	3	**1**	4	4	5	8	2	Ret	7	Ret	2	2	139
5	(Germany) Vincent Andronaco (Germany) Andreas Mayrl	(Germany) Allied Racing	**1**	3	Ret	3	Ret	3			DNS	Ret	**1**	Ret	97
6	(Germany) Robert Haub	(Germany) Drago Racing Team ZVO	7	5	7	5	9	7	DNS	4	3	3	5	9	88
7	(France) Antoine Leclerc (Switzerland) Loïc Villiger	(France) Code Racing Development	DNS	40†	6	42†	Ret	1	**1**	**2**	8	**9**	Ret	Ret	85
8	(Germany) Max Kronberg (Germany) Hendrik Still	(Germany) W&S Motorsport	4	4	24	7	23	34	Ret	Ret	2	2	Ret	4	78
9	(France) Eric Debard (France) Simon Gachet	(France) AKKodis ASP Team	6	20	**8**	Ret	3	9	5	3			8	6	67
10	(Czech Republic) Gabriela Jílková	(Germany) Drago Racing Team ZVO	7	5	7	5	9	7	DNS	4					46
11	(France) Théo Nouet	(Germany) Drago Racing Team ZVO									3	3	5	9	42
12	(France) Laurent Hurgon (France) Jean-Baptiste Mela	(France) Autosport GP													42
13	(France) Julien Briché (France) Jean-Laurent Navarro	(France) JSB Compétition													38
14	(Belgium) Rodrigue Gillion (Belgium) Nico Verdonck	(Germany) PROsport Racing													35
15	(Czech Republic) Jakub Knoll (Spain) Filip Vava	(Spain) NM Racing Team													28
16	(France) Etienne Cheli (France) Corentin Surand	(France) TGR CMR													27
17	(United Kingdom) Adam Carroll (United Kingdom) Tim Whale	(United Kingdom) Greystone GT													22
18	(France) Nicolas Gomar (France) Mike Parisy	(France) AGS Events													18
19	(Turkey) Yağız Gedik (Turkey) Jason Tahincioğlu	(Turkey) Borusan Otomotiv Motorsport													12
20	(France) Gregory Faessel Curson	(France) Saintéloc Racing													2
20	(France) Adrien Tambay	(France) Saintéloc Racing													2
20	(France) Anthony Beltoise (France) Olivier Esteves	(France) Saintéloc Racing													2
21	(Germany) Ralf Kellerners	(Germany) Hella Pagid - racing one													2
21	(Germany) Christian Gisy	(Germany) Hella Pagid - racing one													2
22	(France) Johan Boris Scheier	(France) Arkadia Racing													1
22	(France) Pierre-Laurent Figuiere	(France) Arkadia Racing													1
22	(Germany) Richard Distl (Switzerland) Alain Valente	(United Kingdom) Greystone GT													1
Am Cup
1															
2															
3															
4															
5															
6															
7															
8															
9															
10															
11															
12															
13															
Pos.	Drivers	Team	IMO (Italy)		LEC (France)		MIS (Italy)		SPA (Belgium)		HOC (Germany)		CAT (Spain)		Points

Key
Colour	Result
Gold	Race winner
Silver	2nd place
Bronze	3rd place
Green	Points finish
Blue	Non-points finish
Blue	Non-classified finish (NC)
Purple	Did not finish (Ret)
Black	Disqualified (DSQ)
Black	Excluded (EX)
White	Did not start (DNS)
White	Race cancelled (C)
White	Withdrew (WD)
Blank	Did not participate

**Bold** – Pole
Italics – Fastest Lap

=== Team's championship ===
Championship points were awarded for the first ten positions in each race. After Q1 and Q2 the Team of the car setting the fastest time in the Silver, Pro-Am and Am Cups will be awarded one point. For the Teams titles Silver, Pro-Am and Am, only the highest-finishing car per Team will score points; all other cars entered by that Team will be invisible as far as scoring points are concerned.

Position	**1st**	**2nd**	**3rd**	**4th**	**5th**	**6th**	**7th**	**8th**	**9th**	**10th**	**Pole**
Points	25	18	15	12	10	8	6	4	2	1	1

==== Silver Cup ====
Pos.	Team	Manufacturer	IMO (Italy)	LEC (France)	MIS (Italy)	SPA (Belgium)	HOC (Germany)	CAT (Spain)	Points
1									
2									
3									
4									
5									
6									
7									
8									
9									
10									
11									
12									
13									
Pos.	Team	Manufacturer	IMO (Italy)	LEC (France)	MIS (Italy)	SPA (Belgium)	HOC (Germany)	CAT (Spain)	Points

==== Pro-Am ====
Pos.	Team	Manufacturer	IMO (Italy)	LEC (France)	MIS (Italy)	SPA (Belgium)	HOC (Germany)	CAT (Spain)	Points
1									
2									
3									
4									
5									
6									
7									
8									
9									
10									
11									
12									
13									
14									
15									
Pos.	Team	Manufacturer	IMO (Italy)	LEC (France)	MIS (Italy)	SPA (Belgium)	HOC (Germany)	CAT (Spain)	Points

==== Am ====
Pos.	Team	Manufacturer	IMO (Italy)	LEC (France)	MIS (Italy)	SPA (Belgium)	HOC (Germany)	CAT (Spain)	Points
1									
2									
3									
4									
5									
6									
7									
8									
9									
10									
11									
12									
Pos.	Team	Manufacturer	IMO (Italy)	LEC (France)	MIS (Italy)	SPA (Belgium)	HOC (Germany)	CAT (Spain)	Points
