= Lluc Ibàñez =

Spanish racing driver (born 2000)

- Nationality: (Spain) Spanish
- Born: Lluc Ibàñez Trullols; 19 July 2000 (age 26) Sant Cugat del Vallès, Catalonia, Spain

GT4 European Series career
- Debut season: 2019
- Current team: NM Racing Team
- Categorisation: FIA Silver
- Starts: 46 (46 entries)
- Wins: 8
- Podiums: 15
- Poles: 5
- Fastest laps: 7
- Best finish: 2nd in 2022

Previous series
- 2018–19, 21–22: French GT4 Cup

Lluc Ibàñez Trullols (born 19 July 2000) is a Spanish racing driver. He is the 2022 GT4 European Series runner-up.

== Racing record ==
=== Racing career summary ===
Season	Series	Team	Races	Wins	Poles	F/Laps	Podiums	Points	Position
2016	Clio Cup España	Esc. Costa Daurada	4	0	0	0	1	38	13th
2018	French GT4 Cup - Pro-Am	NM Racing Team	2	0	0	0	0	0	NC†
2018	24H GT Series - GT4 - European Championship	NM Racing Team	1	1	1	1	1	0	NC†
2019	GT4 European Series - Silver	NM Racing Team	6	0	0	0	0	13	19th
2019	GT4 European Series - Pro-Am	NM Racing Team	6	0	1	2	1	30	13th
2019	French GT4 Cup - Pro-Am	ABM Grand Prix	2	0	0	0	0	0	NC†
2020	GT4 European Series - Silver	NM Racing Team	10	4	1	1	5	141	5th
2021	GT4 European Series - Silver	NM Racing Team	12	1	1	1	3	97	4th
2021	French GT4 Cup - Pro-Am	NM Racing Team	12	1	0	0	1	49	12th
2022	GT4 European Series - Silver	NM Racing Team	12	3	2	3	6	156	**2nd**
2022	French GT4 Cup - Silver	NM Racing Team	2	0	0	0	0	10	12th
2023	GT4 European Series - Silver	NM Racing Team	11	0	0	0	1	30	22nd
2023	24H GT Series - GTX	NM Racing Team	1	0	0	1	0	0	NC
2023	GT Cup Open Europe	NM Racing	2	0	0	0	2	0	NC†
2024	GT4 Winter Series	NM Racing Team	3	0	0	0	0	0	NC†
2024	GT4 European Series - Silver	NM Racing Team	12	1	2	3	4	99	4th
2024	French GT4 Cup - Silver	NM Racing Team	2	1	1	1	1	36	10th
2025	GT4 European Series - Silver	NM Racing Team							
2026	Nürburgring Langstrecken-Serie - VT2-RWD	Manheller Racing							
2026	GT4 European Series - Silver	NM Racing Team							

^{†} As Ibáñez was a guest driver, he was ineligible to score points.* Season still in progress.

=== Complete GT4 European Series results ===
(key) (Races in bold indicate pole position) (Races in italics indicate fastest lap)

Year	Team	Car	Class	1	2	3	4	5	6	7	8	9	10	11	12	Pos	Points
2019	NM Racing Team	Ginetta G55 GT4	Silver	IMO; 1; 16	IMO; 2; 12	BRH; 1; 20	BRH; 2; 12	LEC; 1; 17	LEC; 2; 7							19th	13
2019	NM Racing Team	Ginetta G55 GT4	Pro-Am							MIS; 1 Ret	MIS; 2 Ret	**ZAN**; **1**; 8	**ZAN**; **2** Ret	NÜR; 1; 19	NÜR; 2; 27	13th	30
2020	NM Racing Team	Mercedes-AMG GT4	Silver	IMO; 1 Ret	IMO; 2; 5	MIS; 1; 1	MIS; 2; 4	**NÜR**; **1**; 1	NÜR; 2; 17	ZAN; 1; 9	ZAN; 2; 10	SPA; 1	SPA; 2	**LEC**; **1**; 1	LEC; 2; 1	5th	141
2021	NM Racing Team	Mercedes-AMG GT4	Silver	MNZ; 1 Ret	MNZ; 2; 6	**LEC**; **1**; 1	LEC; 2; 36	ZAN; 1; 11	ZAN; 2; 4	SPA; 1; 8	SPA; 2; 9	NÜR; 1; 10	NÜR; 2; 6	CAT; 1; 16	CAT; 2; 11	4th	97
2022	NM Racing Team	Mercedes-AMG GT4	Silver	IMO; 1; 38	IMO; 2; 24	LEC; 1; 3	**LEC**; **2**; 3	**MIS**; **1**; 10	**MIS**; **2**; 1	SPA; 1; 5	SPA; 2; 3	HOC; 1; 1	HOC; 2; 28	CAT; 1; 8	CAT; 2; 13	2nd	156
2023	NM Racing Team	Mercedes-AMG GT4	Silver	MNZ; 1 Ret	MNZ; 2 DNS	LEC; 1; 14	LEC; 2; 25	SPA; 1; 20	SPA; 2; 7	MIS; 1; 3	MIS; 2; 13	HOC; 1; 25	HOC; 2; 15	CAT; 1; 11	CAT; 2; 11	22nd	30
2024	NM Racing Team	Mercedes AMG GT4	Silver	LEC; 1; 3	LEC; 2; 9	**MIS**; **1**; 1	MIS; 2 Ret	SPA; 1; 10	SPA; 2; 39	**HOC**; **1**; 3	HOC; 2; 7	MNZ; 1; 2	MNZ; 2; 12	JED; 1; 6	JED; 2; 7	4th	99
2025	NM Racing Team	Mercedes AMG GT4	Silver	LEC; 1; 5	LEC; 2; 5	ZAN; 1; 5	ZAN; 2; 3	SPA; 1; 10	SPA; 2; 12	MIS; 1; 2	MIS; 2; 3	NÜR; 1; 8	NÜR; 2; 4	CAT; 1; 4	CAT; 2; 8	4th	113
