= Grégory Guilvert =

French racing driver (born 1982)

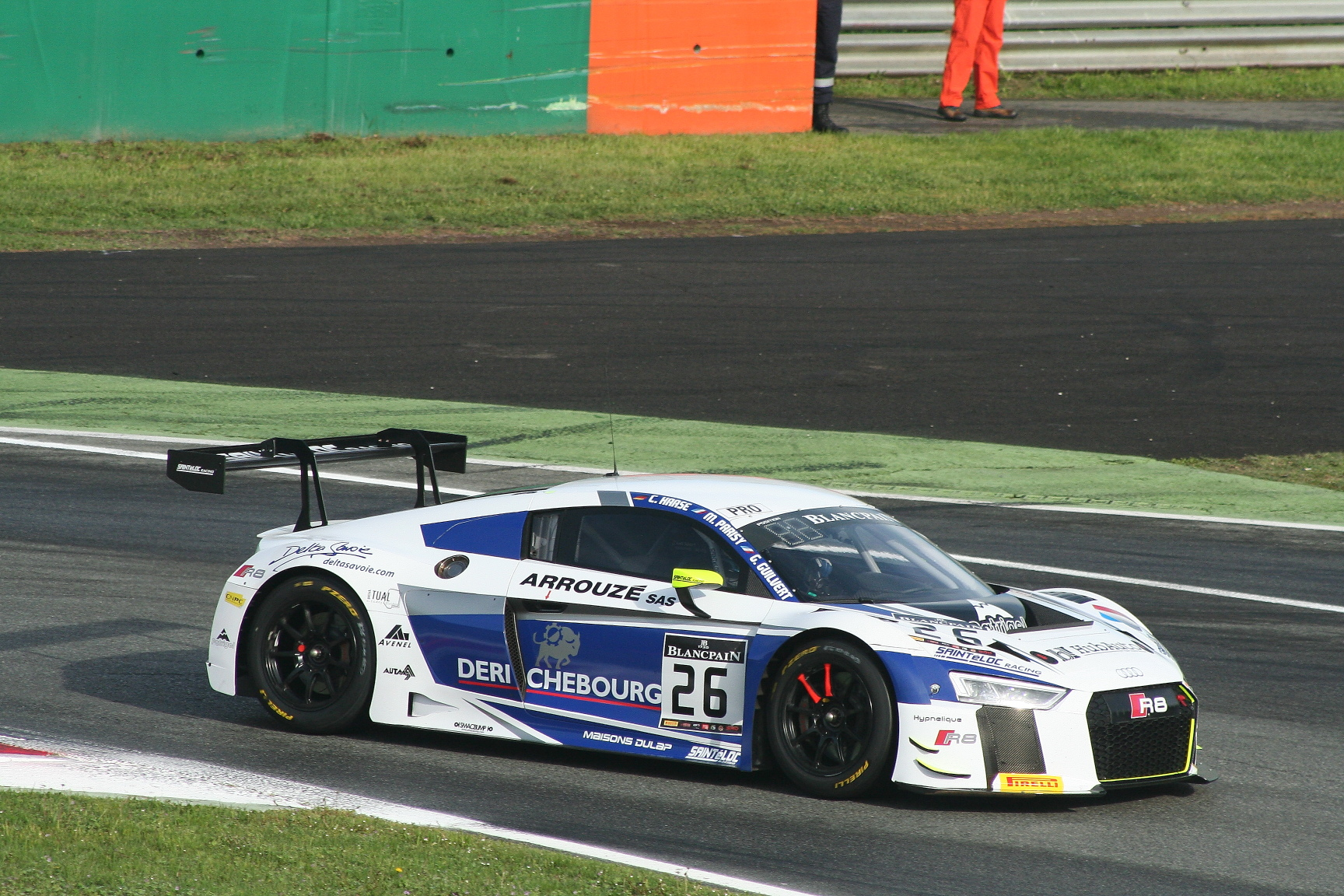
- Guilvert in 2016
- Nationality: (France) French
- Born: Grégory Nicolas Guilvert; 8 May 1982 (age 44) Melun, Île-de-France, France

TCR International Series career
- Debut season: 2016
- Current team: Sébastien Loeb Racing
- Categorisation: FIA Gold (until 2022); FIA Silver (2023–)
- Car number: 38
- Starts: 2

Previous series
- 2015 2014 2013 2012 2011–2016 2011 2010–2012 2009 2007–2009 2006, 2009 2005 2003–2006: Porsche Carrera Cup France; Blancpain Sprint Series; Gulf 12 Hours; Racecar Euro Series; Blancpain Endurance Series; Eurocup Mégane Trophy; FIA GT3 European Championship; Bioracing Series; Peugeot THP Spider Cup France; Renault Clio Cup France; French Supertouring; Peugeot 206 Cup France

Championship titles
- 2021, 2023 2018–2020 2009 2004: GT4 European Series – Pro-Am; FFSA GT Championship; Peugeot THP Spider Cup France; Peugeot 206 Cup France - Junior Class

Grégory Nicolas Guilvert (born 8 May 1982) is a French racing driver currently competing in the GT World Challenge Europe Endurance Cup. A Saintéloc Racing veteran, he has won multiple championships in Audi GT4 machinery and was third overall in the 2014 Blancpain Endurance Series.

== Racing career ==
Guilvert began his career in 2002 in karting. In 2003, he switched to the French Peugeot 206 Cup, he raced there up until 2004 and won the Junior Class title that year. He switched to the French Supertouring Championship for 2005, taking a single victory on his way to finish 3rd in the standings. He returned to the French Peugeot 206 Cup for 2006, finishing second in the championship standings that year. For 2007, he switched to the French Peugeot THP Spider Cup, ultimately winning the championship in 2009. In 2010, he switched to the FFSA GT Championship, finishing eighth in 2011 and 2012 in the championship standings. He also took part in the FIA GT3 European Championship in 2010, racing there up until 2012. In 2011, he raced in the Eurocup Mégane Trophy alongside his participation in the Blancpain Endurance Series, where he finished third in the Pro Cup in 2014. He also raced part-time in the Porsche Carrera Cup France championship in 2015, finishing 15th in the standings. For 2016, he stayed in the Blancpain Endurance Series, now named Blancpain GT Series Endurance Cup.

In April 2016, it was announced that Guilvert would make a one-off start in the TCR International Series, driving a Peugeot 308 Racing Cup for Sébastien Loeb Racing at Spa-Francorchamps.

Guilvert stepped down to GT4 in 2017—his expertise quickly proving a fit for the class as he led Saintéloc Racing to three titles in the FFSA GT Championship and two in SRO's GT4 European Series. He returned to the GT World Challenge Europe Endurance Cup in 2026, sharing the No. 25 Audi R8 LMS Evo II with Didier André.

Alongside his sports car racing exploits, Guilvert has enjoyed considerable success in karting, a career he resumed in 2015 in KZ2.

== Racing record ==
=== Complete GT World Challenge Europe results ===
==== GT World Challenge Europe Endurance Cup ====
(Races in bold indicate pole position) (Races in italics indicate fastest lap)

Year	Team	Car	Class	1	2	3	4	5	6	7	8	Pos.	Points
2011	Ruffier Racing	Lamborghini Gallardo GT3	GT3 Gentlemen	MNZ; 9	NAV	SPA; 6H	SPA; 12H	SPA; 24H	MAG; 16	SIL		9th	50
2012	Saintéloc Racing	Audi R8 LMS Ultra	Pro-Am	MNZ; 23	SIL; 26	LEC; Ret						NC	0
2012	Saintéloc Racing	Audi R8 LMS Ultra	Pro				SPA; 6H ?	SPA; 12H ?	SPA; 24H; Ret	NÜR; 5	NAV; DNS	24th	5
2013	Saintéloc Racing	Audi R8 LMS Ultra	Pro	MNZ; Ret	SIL; Ret	LEC; 41						NC	0
2013	Boutsen Ginion	McLaren MP4-12C GT3	Pro-Am				SPA; 6H ?	SPA; 12H ?	SPA; 24H; Ret	NÜR		NC	0
2014	Saintéloc Racing	Audi R8 LMS ultra	Pro	MNZ; 2	SIL; 4	LEC; 5	SPA; 6H; 2	SPA; 12H; 4	SPA; 24H; 4	NÜR; 34		3rd	67
2015	Saintéloc Racing	Audi R8 LMS ultra	Pro	MNZ; 9	SIL; 12	LEC; 23	SPA; 6H; 2	SPA; 12H; 42	SPA; 24H; Ret	NÜR; 7		14th	23
2016	Saintéloc Racing	Audi R8 LMS ultra	Pro	MNZ; 12	SIL; 7	LEC; 6	SPA; 6H; 11	SPA; 12H; 13	SPA; 24H; 7	NÜR; 17		14th	21
2017	Saintéloc Racing	Audi R8 LMS	Pro-Am	MNZ	SIL	LEC; Ret	SPA; 6H	SPA; 12H	SPA; 24H	BAR		NC	0

=== Complete NASCAR results ===
(key) (Bold – Pole position. Italics – Fastest lap. * – Most laps led. ^ – Most positions gained)

==== Racecar Euro Series - Elite ====
NASCAR Racecar Euro Series - Elite results
Year	Team	No.	Make	1	2	3	4	5	6	7	8	9	10	NWES	Pts
2012	Still Racing	14	Chevy	NOG; 7	NOG; 4	BRH	BRH	SPA	SPA	VAL	VAL	BUG	BUG	25th	77

=== Complete TCR International Series results ===
(key) (Races in bold indicate pole position) (Races in italics indicate fastest lap)

Year	Team	Car	1	2	3	4	5	6	7	8	9	10	11	12	13	14	15	16	17	18	19	20	21	22	DC	Points
2016	Sébastien Loeb Racing	Peugeot 308 Racing Cup	BHR; 1	BHR; 2	POR; 1	POR; 2	BEL; 1; 12	BEL; 2; 12	ITA; 1	ITA; 2	AUT; 1	AUT; 2	GER; 1	GER; 2	RUS; 1	RUS; 2	THA; 1	THA; 2	SIN; 1	SIN; 2	MYS; 1	MYS; 2	MAC; 1	MAC; 2	NC	0

=== Complete GT4 European Series results ===
(key) (Races in bold indicate pole position) (Races in italics indicate fastest lap)

Year	Team	Car	Class	1	2	3	4	5	6	7	8	9	10	11	12	Pos	Points
2021	Saintéloc Racing	Audi R8 LMS GT4 Evo	Pro-Am	MNZ; 1; 7	MNZ; 2; 3	**LEC**; **1**; 9	**LEC**; **2**; 3	**ZAN**; **1**; 2	ZAN; 2; 2	SPA; 1; 11	SPA; 2; 7	NÜR; 1; 8	NÜR; 2 Ret	CAT; 1; 1	CAT; 2; 3	1st	246
2022	Saintéloc Racing	Audi R8 LMS GT4 Evo	Pro-Am	IMO; 1; 24	IMO; 2; 3	LEC; 1; 16	LEC; 2; 16	MIS; 1; 2	MIS; 2; 15	SPA; 1; 9	SPA; 2; 5	HOC; 1; 36†	HOC; 2; 4	CAT; 1; 9	CAT; 2; 9	3rd	142
2023	Saintéloc Junior Team	Audi R8 LMS GT4 Evo	Pro-Am	**MNZ**; **1**; 10	MNZ; 2; 16	**LEC**; **1**; 5	LEC; 2; 22	SPA; 1; 3	SPA; 2 Ret	MIS; 1; 11	MIS; 2; 7	HOC; 1; 7	HOC; 2; 11	CAT; 1; 8	**CAT**; **2**; 6	1st	234
2024	Chazel Technologie Course	BMW M4 GT4 Gen II	Pro-Am	LEC; 1 DNS	LEC; 2; 21	MIS; 1; 13	MIS; 2 Ret	SPA; 1; 21	SPA; 2; 10	HOC; 1; 16	HOC; 2; 26	MNZ; 1; 25	MNZ; 2; 28	JED; 1	JED; 2	4th	91
2025	Team Speedcar	Audi R8 LMS GT4 Evo	Silver	**LEC**; **1** Ret	**LEC**; **2**; 11	**ZAN**; **1**; 3	ZAN; 2; 6	SPA; 1; 1	SPA; 2 Ret	MIS; 1; 7	MIS; 2; 4	NÜR; 1; 9	NÜR; 2; 6	CAT; 1; 10	CAT; 2; 5	7th	91
