= Roee Meyuhas =

American-Israeli racing driver (born 2000)

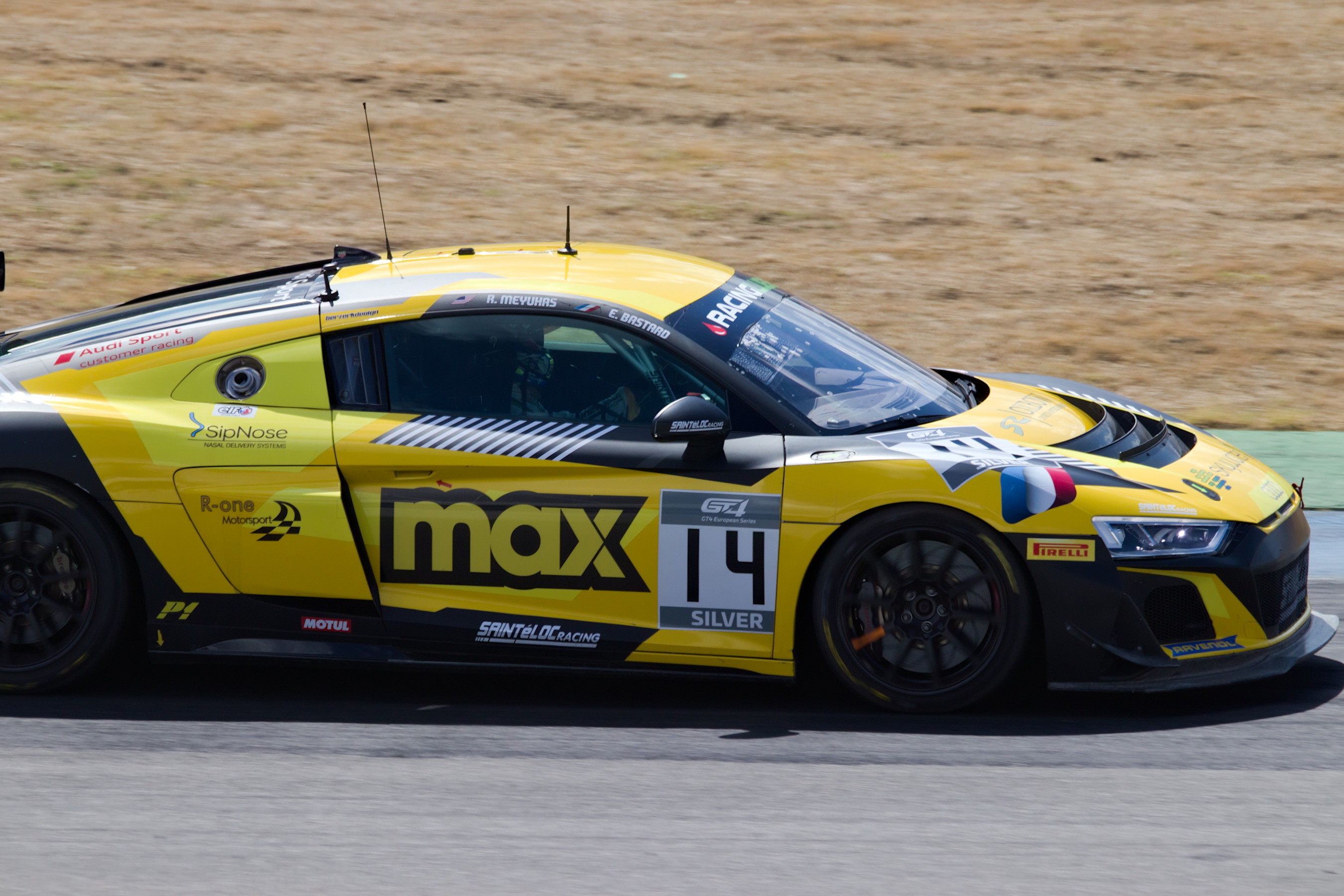
- Meyuhas racing at the Hockenheimring in 2022
- Nationality: (United States) American (Israel) Israeli (Note: Meyuhas competed under an Israeli racing licence earlier in his career. He currently represents the United States.)
- Born: 24 June 2000 (age 26) Boston, Massachusetts, U.S.

GT World Challenge Europe Endurance Cup career
- Debut season: 2023
- Current team: Boutsen VDS
- Categorisation: FIA Silver
- Starts: 5 (5 entries)
- Wins: 0
- Podiums: 0
- Poles: 0
- Fastest laps: 0
- Best finish: 7th in 2023 (Silver Cup)

Previous series
- 2021–22 2022 2019–20 2019: GT4 European Series; French GT4 Cup; ADAC Formula 4 Italian F4 Championship

Championship titles
- 2022 2022: GT4 European Series; French GT4 Cup

Roee Meyuhas (Hebrew: רו מיוחס; born 24 June 2000) is an American-Israeli racing driver. He is a former champion of the GT4 European Series and French GT4 Cup.

== Racing record ==
=== Racing career summary ===
Season	Series	Team	Races	Wins	Poles	F/Laps	Podiums	Points	Position
2019	Italian F4 Championship	Cram Motorsport	21	0	0	0	0	15	20th
2019	ADAC Formula 4 Championship	Cram Motorsport	3	0	0	0	0	0	NC†
2020	ADAC Formula 4 Championship	R-ace GP	9	0	0	0	0	20	14th
2021	GT4 European Series - Silver	Saintéloc Racing	12	0	1	0	1	30	14th
2022	GT4 European Series - Silver	Saintéloc Racing	12	3	0	0	6	159	**1st**
2022	French GT4 Cup - Silver	Saintéloc Racing	12	4	1	2	7	202	**1st**
2023	GT World Challenge Europe Endurance Cup	Boutsen VDS	5	0	0	0	0	0	NC
2023	GT World Challenge Europe Endurance Cup - Silver	Boutsen VDS	5	0	0	0	0	39	7th
2023	Lamborghini Super Trofeo Europe	Boutsen VDS	4	0	1	2	0	27	14th
2024	GT World Challenge Europe Endurance Cup	Boutsen VDS	4	0	0	0	0	0	NC
2024	GT World Challenge Europe Endurance Cup - Silver	Boutsen VDS	4	1	0	0	2	57	7th
2024	Lamborghini Super Trofeo Europe	Boutsen VDS							
2026	Le Mans Cup - LMP3	Forestier Racing by VPS	6	0	0	0	0	30	8th

^{†} As Meyuhas was a guest driver, he was ineligible to score points.* Season still in progress.

=== Complete Italian F4 Championship results ===
(key) (Races in bold indicate pole position) (Races in italics indicate fastest lap)

Year	Team	1	2	3	4	5	6	7	8	9	10	11	12	13	14	15	16	17	18	19	20	21	22	Pos	Points
2019	Cram Motorsport	VLL; 1; 22	VLL; 2; 21	VLL; 3; 23	MIS; 1; 10	MIS; 2; 6	MIS; 3 C	HUN; 1; 29	HUN; 2; 16	HUN; 3; 15	RBR; 1; 16	RBR; 2 Ret	RBR; 3; 22	IMO; 1; 16	IMO; 2; 19	IMO; 3; 18	IMO; 4; 7	MUG; 1; 16	MUG; 2; 14	MUG; 3; 24	MNZ; 1; 18	MNZ; 2; 16	MNZ; 3; 11	20th	15

=== Complete ADAC Formula 4 Championship results ===
(key) (Races in bold indicate pole position) (Races in italics indicate fastest lap)

Year	Team	1	2	3	4	5	6	7	8	9	10	11	12	13	14	15	16	17	18	19	20	21	Pos	Points
2019	Cram Motorsport	OSC; 1	OSC; 2	OSC; 3	RBR; 1; 19	RBR; 2; 17	RBR; 3; 15	HOC1; 1	HOC1; 2	ZAN; 1	ZAN; 2	ZAN; 3	NÜR; 1	NÜR; 2	NÜR; 3	HOC2; 1	HOC2; 2	HOC2; 3	SAC; 1	SAC; 2	SAC; 3		NC	-
2020	R-ace GP	LAU1; 1	LAU1; 2	LAU1; 3	NÜR1; 1	NÜR1; 2	NÜR1; 3	HOC; 1	HOC; 2	HOC; 3	NÜR2; 1	NÜR2; 2	NÜR2; 3	RBR; 1; 10	RBR; 2; 9	RBR; 3; 11	LAU2; 1; 10	LAU2; 2; 8	LAU2; 3; 5	OSC; 1; 10	OSC; 2; 10	OSC; 3 Ret	14th	20

=== Complete GT4 European Series results ===
(key) (Races in bold indicate pole position) (Races in italics indicate fastest lap)

Year	Team	Car	Class	1	2	3	4	5	6	7	8	9	10	11	12	Pos	Points
2021	Saintéloc Racing	Audi R8 LMS GT4 Evo	Silver	MNZ; 1; 13	MNZ; 2; 23	LEC; 1; 18	LEC; 2; 18	ZAN; 1; 17	ZAN; 2; 21	SPA; 1; 34	SPA; 2; 37†	NÜR; 1; 9	NÜR; 2; 27	CAT; 1; 24	**CAT**; **2**; 5	14th	30
2022	Saintéloc Racing	Audi R8 LMS GT4 Evo	Silver	IMO; 1; 4	IMO; 2; 4	LEC; 1; 23	LEC; 2; 21	MIS; 1; 32	MIS; 2; 11	SPA; 1; 3	SPA; 2; 1	HOC; 1; 8	**HOC**; **2**; 1	CAT; 1; 2	CAT; 2; 8	1st	159

=== Complete GT World Challenge results ===
==== GT World Challenge Europe Endurance Cup ====
(Races in bold indicate pole position) (Races in italics indicate fastest lap)

Year	Team	Car	Class	1	2	3	4	5	6	7	Pos.	Points
2023	Boutsen VDS	Audi R8 LMS Evo II	Silver	MNZ; 33	LEC; 21	SPA; 6H; 41	SPA; 12H; 63	SPA; 24H; Ret	NÜR; 38	CAT; Ret	7th	39
2024	Boutsen VDS	Mercedes-AMG GT3 Evo	Silver	LEC; 21	SPA; 6H; 27	SPA; 12H; 32	SPA; 24H; 40	NÜR; 16	MNZ; Ret	JED	7th	57

=== Complete Le Mans Cup results ===
(key) (Races in bold indicate pole position; results in italics indicate fastest lap)

Year	Entrant	Class	Chassis	1	2	3	4	5	6	Rank	Points
2026	Forestier Racing by VPS	LMP3	Ligier JS P325	BAR; 5	LEC; 8	LMS; Ret	SPA; 6	SIL; 6	POR; 15	8th	30
