= 2021 GT4 European Series =

Car racing competition

The 2021 GT4 European Series is the fourteenth season of the GT4 European Series, a Sports car racing championship organised by Stéphane Ratel Organisation (SRO). The season will begin at Monza on the 16th of April, and will end at the Circuit de Barcelona-Catalunya on the 10th of October.

== Calendar ==
A 2021 calendar was announced on 23 October 2020 at SRO's annual press conference at the 2020 24 Hours of Spa.

| Round | Circuit | Date | Supporting |
|---|---|---|---|
| 1 | Autodromo Nazionale di Monza, Monza, Italy | 17–18 April | GT World Challenge Europe Endurance Cup |
| 2 | Circuit Paul Ricard, Le Castellet, France | 28–30 May | GT World Challenge Europe Endurance Cup |
| 3 | Circuit Zandvoort, Zandvoort, Netherlands | 18–20 June | GT World Challenge Europe Sprint Cup |
| 4 | Circuit de Spa-Francorchamps, Stavelot, Belgium | 29 July - 1 August | GT World Challenge Europe Endurance Cup |
| 5 | Nürburgring, Nürburg, Germany | 4–5 September | GT World Challenge Europe Endurance Cup |
| 6 | Circuit de Barcelona-Catalunya, Montmeló, Spain | 8–10 October | GT World Challenge Europe Endurance Cup |

== Entry list ==
The full season entry list was released on 31 March and contained 37 cars.

| Team | Car | No. | Drivers | Class | Rounds |
|---|---|---|---|---|---|
| (Belgium) Street Art Racing | Aston Martin Vantage AMR GT4 | 007 | (Switzerland) Pascal Bachmann | Am | All |
| (Belgium) Street Art Racing | Aston Martin Vantage AMR GT4 | 007 | (Belgium) Paul Theysgens | Am | All |
| (Spain) CD Sport | Mercedes-AMG GT4 | 2 | (France) Hugo Chevalier | PA | 1–4, 6 |
| (Spain) CD Sport | Mercedes-AMG GT4 | 2 | (France) Jean-Ludovic Foubert | PA | 1–4, 6 |
| (Spain) CD Sport | Mercedes-AMG GT4 | 2 | (France) Edouard Cauhaupe | S | 5 |
| (Spain) CD Sport | Mercedes-AMG GT4 | 2 | (France) Hugo Chevalier | S | 5 |
| (Spain) CD Sport | Mercedes-AMG GT4 | 74 | (France) Sébastien Baud | S | All |
| (Spain) CD Sport | Mercedes-AMG GT4 | 74 | (France) Enzo Joulié | S | All |
| (France) TGR CMR (France) CMR | Toyota GR Supra GT4 | 3 | (France) Andrea Benezet | Am | All |
| (France) TGR CMR (France) CMR | Toyota GR Supra GT4 | 3 | (France) Wilfried Cazalbon | Am | All |
| (France) TGR CMR (France) CMR | Toyota GR Supra GT4 | 8 | (Belgium) Stéphane Lémeret | S | All |
| (France) TGR CMR (France) CMR | Toyota GR Supra GT4 | 8 | (Belgium) Antoine Potty | S | All |
| (France) TGR CMR (France) CMR | Alpine A110 GT4 | 30 | (France) Vincent Beltoise | S | All |
| (France) TGR CMR (France) CMR | Alpine A110 GT4 | 30 | (France) Loris Cabirou | S | All |
| (France) Team Speedcar | Audi R8 LMS GT4 Evo | 4 | (France) Robert Consani | S | All |
| (France) Team Speedcar | Audi R8 LMS GT4 Evo | 4 | (France) Benjamin Lariche | S | All |
| (France) Team Speedcar | Audi R8 LMS GT4 Evo | 5 | (France) Pierre Courroye | PA | 1–4, 6 |
| (France) Team Speedcar | Audi R8 LMS GT4 Evo | 5 | (France) Thomas Hodier | PA | 1–4, 6 |
| (Germany) Hella Pagid - racing one | Audi R8 LMS GT4 Evo | 9 | (Germany) Christian Gisy | PA | 1–5 |
| (Germany) Hella Pagid - racing one | Audi R8 LMS GT4 Evo | 9 | (Germany) Ralf Kelleners | PA | 1–5 |
| (Germany) Hella Pagid - racing one | Audi R8 LMS GT4 Evo | 9 | (Germany) Christian Gisy | Am | 6 |
| (Germany) Hella Pagid - racing one | Audi R8 LMS GT4 Evo | 9 | (Germany) Vincent Gisy | Am | 6 |
| (Germany) Hella Pagid - racing one | Aston Martin Vantage AMR GT4 | 18 | (Germany) Markus Lungstrass | Am | 1–3, 5–6 |
| (Germany) Hella Pagid - racing one | Aston Martin Vantage AMR GT4 | 18 | (Denmark) Henrik Lyngbye Pedersen | Am | 1–3, 5–6 |
| (Italy) Ebimotors | Porsche 718 Cayman GT4 Clubsport | 10 | (Italy) Paolo Gnemmi | PA | 1 |
| (Italy) Ebimotors | Porsche 718 Cayman GT4 Clubsport | 10 | (Italy) Riccardo Pera | PA | 1 |
| (Russia) Iskra Motorsport by Ebimotors | Porsche 718 Cayman GT4 Clubsport | 37 | (Russia) Andrey Solukovtsev | Am | 1 |
| (Turkey) Borusan Otomotiv Motorsport | BMW M4 GT4 | 11 | (Turkey) Yagiz Gedik | PA | All |
| (Turkey) Borusan Otomotiv Motorsport | BMW M4 GT4 | 11 | (Turkey) Hasan Tansu | PA | All |
| (Turkey) Borusan Otomotiv Motorsport | BMW M4 GT4 | 12 | (Turkey) Berkay Besler | PA | All |
| (Turkey) Borusan Otomotiv Motorsport | BMW M4 GT4 | 12 | (Turkey) Cem Bölükbaşı | PA | All |
| (Germany) Team Zakspeed | Mercedes-AMG GT4 | 13 | (Germany) Jan Marschalkowski | S | 5 |
| (Germany) Team Zakspeed | Mercedes-AMG GT4 | 13 | (France) Théo Nouet | S | 5 |
| (Germany) Team Zakspeed | Mercedes-AMG GT4 | 19 | (Germany) Robert Haub | PA | 5 |
| (Germany) Team Zakspeed | Mercedes-AMG GT4 | 19 | (Czech Republic) Gabriela Jílková | PA | 5 |
| (France) Saintéloc Racing | Audi R8 LMS GT4 Evo | 14 | (Israel) Roee Meyuhas | S | All |
| (France) Saintéloc Racing | Audi R8 LMS GT4 Evo | 14 | (Luxembourg) Clement Sleyer | S | All |
| (France) Saintéloc Racing | Audi R8 LMS GT4 Evo | 21 | (France) Nyls Stievenart | PA | 1, 3 |
| (France) Saintéloc Racing | Audi R8 LMS GT4 Evo | 21 | (France) Grégory Faessel-Curson | PA | 1, 3 |
| (France) Saintéloc Racing | Audi R8 LMS GT4 Evo | 21 | (France) Grégory Faessel-Curson | Am | 2, 4–6 |
| (France) Saintéloc Racing | Audi R8 LMS GT4 Evo | 21 | (France) Evens Stievenart | Am | 2 |
| (France) Saintéloc Racing | Audi R8 LMS GT4 Evo | 25 | (France) Cyril Saleilles | Am | 6 |
| (France) Saintéloc Racing | Audi R8 LMS GT4 Evo | 25 | (France) Olivier Esteves | Am | 6 |
| (France) Saintéloc Racing | Audi R8 LMS GT4 Evo | 42 | (France) Grégory Guilvert | PA | All |
| (France) Saintéloc Racing | Audi R8 LMS GT4 Evo | 42 | (France) Fabien Michal | PA | All |
| (Spain) NM Racing Team | Mercedes-AMG GT4 | 15 | (Spain) Lluc Ibáñez | S | All |
| (Spain) NM Racing Team | Mercedes-AMG GT4 | 15 | (Spain) Xavier Lloveras | S | All |
| (Spain) NM Racing Team | Mercedes-AMG GT4 | 126 | (Spain) Filip Vava | PA | All |
| (Spain) NM Racing Team | Mercedes-AMG GT4 | 126 | (Spain) Rafael Villanueva | PA | All |
| (Netherlands) V8 Racing | Chevrolet Camaro GT4.R | 17 | (Netherlands) Thijmen Nabuurs | S | All |
| (Netherlands) V8 Racing | Chevrolet Camaro GT4.R | 17 | (Netherlands) Jop Rappange | S | All |
| (Germany) Allied Racing | Porsche 718 Cayman GT4 Clubsport | 20 | (Germany) Constantin Dressler | PA | 1–3 |
| (Germany) Allied Racing | Porsche 718 Cayman GT4 Clubsport | 20 | (Germany) Dennis Fetzer | PA | 1–3 |
| (Germany) Allied Racing | Porsche 718 Cayman GT4 Clubsport | 20 | (Germany) Moritz Wiskirchen | Am | 5 |
| (Germany) Allied Racing | Porsche 718 Cayman GT4 Clubsport | 20 | (Germany) Jan Kasperlik | Am | 5 |
| (Germany) Allied Racing | Porsche 718 Cayman GT4 Clubsport | 22 | (Germany) Joel Sturm | S | All |
| (Germany) Allied Racing | Porsche 718 Cayman GT4 Clubsport | 22 | (Denmark) Nicolaj Møller Madsen | S | 1–5 |
| (Germany) Allied Racing | Porsche 718 Cayman GT4 Clubsport | 22 | (Denmark) Bastian Buus | S | 6 |
| (Germany) Allied Racing | Porsche 718 Cayman GT4 Clubsport | 26 | (Switzerland) Joël Camathias | PA | All |
| (Germany) Allied Racing | Porsche 718 Cayman GT4 Clubsport | 26 | (Germany) Alexander Hartvig | PA | All |
| (United Kingdom) United Autosports | McLaren 570S GT4 | 23 | (United Kingdom) Charlie Fagg | S | All |
| (United Kingdom) United Autosports | McLaren 570S GT4 | 23 | (United Kingdom) Bailey Voisin | S | All |
| (United Kingdom) United Autosports | McLaren 570S GT4 | 32 | (United Kingdom) Gus Bowers | S | All |
| (United Kingdom) United Autosports | McLaren 570S GT4 | 32 | (United Kingdom) Dean MacDonald | S | All |
| (France) AGS Events | Aston Martin Vantage AMR GT4 | 27 | (France) César Gazeau | S | All |
| (France) AGS Events | Aston Martin Vantage AMR GT4 | 27 | (Switzerland) Konstantin Lachenauer | S | All |
| (France) AGS Events | Aston Martin Vantage AMR GT4 | 45 | (France) Hugo Condé | S | 1–4, 6 |
| (France) AGS Events | Aston Martin Vantage AMR GT4 | 45 | (India) Akhil Rabindra | S | 1–4 |
| (France) AGS Events | Aston Martin Vantage AMR GT4 | 45 | (France) Hugo Roch | S | 6 |
| (France) AGS Events | Aston Martin Vantage AMR GT4 | 45 | (France) Hugo Condé | PA | 5 |
| (France) AGS Events | Aston Martin Vantage AMR GT4 | 45 | (France) Gilles Vannelet | PA | 5 |
| (France) AGS Events | Aston Martin Vantage AMR GT4 | 79 | (France) Milane Petelet | S | 6 |
| (France) AGS Events | Aston Martin Vantage AMR GT4 | 79 | (France) Romain Leroux | S | 6 |
| (France) AGS Events | Aston Martin Vantage AMR GT4 | 89 | (France) Nicolas Gomar | Am | All |
| (France) AGS Events | Aston Martin Vantage AMR GT4 | 89 | (France) Eric Herr | Am | All |
| (Spain) TGR SVC Sport Management | Toyota GR Supra GT4 | 33 | (Poland) Antoni Chodzen | PA | 1–2, 4–6 |
| (Spain) TGR SVC Sport Management | Toyota GR Supra GT4 | 33 | (Poland) Piotr Chodzen | PA | 1–2, 4–6 |
| (Belgium) Selleslagh Racing Team | Mercedes-AMG GT4 | 34 | (Italy) Luca Bosco | PA | All |
| (Belgium) Selleslagh Racing Team | Mercedes-AMG GT4 | 34 | (Belgium) O'Neill Muth | PA | 1–2 |
| (Belgium) Selleslagh Racing Team | Mercedes-AMG GT4 | 34 | (Netherlands) Olivier Hart | PA | 3 |
| (Belgium) Selleslagh Racing Team | Mercedes-AMG GT4 | 34 | (Belgium) Maxime Soulet | PA | 4–6 |
| (Belgium) Selleslagh Racing Team | Mercedes-AMG GT4 | 35 | (Belgium) Sven van Laere | Am | 1–2 |
| (Belgium) Selleslagh Racing Team | Mercedes-AMG GT4 | 35 | (Belgium) Johan Vannerum | Am | 1–2 |
| (Belgium) Selleslagh Racing Team | Mercedes-AMG GT4 | 35 | (Netherlands) Bob Herber | Am | 4 |
| (Belgium) Selleslagh Racing Team | Mercedes-AMG GT4 | 35 | (Czech Republic) Jakub Knoll | PA | 5 |
| (Belgium) Selleslagh Racing Team | Mercedes-AMG GT4 | 35 | (Germany) Moritz Kranz | PA | 5 |
| (Belgium) Selleslagh Racing Team | Mercedes-AMG GT4 | 35 | (Czech Republic) Jakub Knoll | S | 6 |
| (Belgium) Selleslagh Racing Team | Mercedes-AMG GT4 | 35 | (United States) Alexandre Papadopulos | S | 6 |
| (France) Arkadia Racing | Alpine A110 GT4 | 36 | (France) Stephan Guérin | PA | All |
| (France) Arkadia Racing | Alpine A110 GT4 | 36 | (France) Antoine Leclerc | PA | All |
| (France) Arkadia Racing | Alpine A110 GT4 | 63 | (France) Pierre-Laurent Figuiere | PA | 6 |
| (France) Arkadia Racing | Alpine A110 GT4 | 63 | (France) Thomas Martinez | PA | 6 |
| (San Marino) W&D Racing Team | BMW M4 GT4 | 50 | (San Marino) Paolo Meloni | Am | All |
| (San Marino) W&D Racing Team | BMW M4 GT4 | 50 | (Italy) Massimiliano Tresoldi | Am | All |
| (France) AKKA ASP | Mercedes-AMG GT4 | 53 | (France) Christophe Bourret | Am | 6 |
| (France) AKKA ASP | Mercedes-AMG GT4 | 53 | (France) Pascal Gibon | Am | 6 |
| (France) AKKA ASP | Mercedes-AMG GT4 | 61 | (France) Benjamin Ricci | Am | All |
| (France) AKKA ASP | Mercedes-AMG GT4 | 61 | (France) Mauro Ricci | Am | All |
| (France) AKKA ASP | Mercedes-AMG GT4 | 87 | (France) Jean-Luc Beaubelique | PA | All |
| (France) AKKA ASP | Mercedes-AMG GT4 | 87 | (France) Jim Pla | PA | All |
| (France) AKKA ASP | Mercedes-AMG GT4 | 88 | (France) Timothé Buret | S | All |
| (France) AKKA ASP | Mercedes-AMG GT4 | 88 | (France) Paul Evrard | S | All |
| (France) Mirage Racing | Aston Martin Vantage AMR GT4 | 55 | (United Kingdom) Tom Canning | S | All |
| (France) Mirage Racing | Aston Martin Vantage AMR GT4 | 55 | (Netherlands) Ruben del Sarte | S | All |
| (France) Mirage Racing | Alpine A110 GT4 | 222 | (France) Rodolophe Wallgren | PA | 6 |
| (France) Mirage Racing | Alpine A110 GT4 | 222 | (France) Gael Castelli | PA | 6 |
| (Germany) Team GT | McLaren 570S GT4 | 60 | (Germany) Richard Distl | PA | 2 |
| (Germany) Team GT | McLaren 570S GT4 | 60 | (Germany) Alexander Woller | PA | 2 |
| (Germany) Team GT | McLaren 570S GT4 | 66 | (Germany) Bernhard Laber | PA | 2 |
| (Germany) Team GT | McLaren 570S GT4 | 66 | (Switzerland) Alain Valente | PA | 2 |
| (France) Full Motorsport | Audi R8 LMS GT4 Evo | 69 | (France) Michael Blanchemain | Am | All |
| (France) Full Motorsport | Audi R8 LMS GT4 Evo | 69 | (France) Christophe Hamon | Am | All |
| (France) Full Motorsport | Audi R8 LMS GT4 Evo | 77 | (France) Eric Clément | PA | All |
| (France) Full Motorsport | Audi R8 LMS GT4 Evo | 77 | (France) Romain Iannetta | PA | All |
| (Italy) Trivellato Racing by Villorba Corse | Mercedes-AMG GT4 | 70 | (Switzerland) Jean-Luc D'Auria | S | All |
| (Italy) Trivellato Racing by Villorba Corse | Mercedes-AMG GT4 | 70 | (United Kingdom) Jamie Caroline | S | 1–5 |
| (Italy) Trivellato Racing by Villorba Corse | Mercedes-AMG GT4 | 70 | (Italy) Francesco Guerra | S | 6 |
| (Italy) Trivellato Racing by Villorba Corse | Mercedes-AMG GT4 | 90 | (Italy) Francesco Guerra | S | 1–4 |
| (Italy) Trivellato Racing by Villorba Corse | Mercedes-AMG GT4 | 90 | (Italy) Jody Vullo | S | 1–4 |
| (United Kingdom) Optimum Motorsport | McLaren 570S GT4 | 72 | (United Kingdom) Lars Dahmann | PA | 4 |
| (United Kingdom) Optimum Motorsport | McLaren 570S GT4 | 72 | (United Kingdom) Charlie Hollings | PA | 4 |
| (Italy) Autorlando Sport | Porsche 718 Cayman GT4 Clubsport | 75 | (Italy) Riccardo Canzian | Am | 1 |
| (Italy) Autorlando Sport | Porsche 718 Cayman GT4 Clubsport | 75 | (Italy) Dario Cerati | Am | 1 |
| (Italy) Autorlando Sport | Porsche 718 Cayman GT4 Clubsport | 76 | (Italy) Giueseppe Ghezzi | Am | 1 |
| (Italy) Autorlando Sport | Porsche 718 Cayman GT4 Clubsport | 76 | (Italy) Alessandro Giovanelli | Am | 1 |
| (Germany) Dörr Motorsport | Aston Martin Vantage AMR GT4 | 97 | (Germany) Phil Dörr | S | 5 |
| (Germany) Dörr Motorsport | Aston Martin Vantage AMR GT4 | 97 | (Germany) Ben Dörr | S | 5 |
| (Switzerland) Porsche Centri Ticino | Porsche 718 Cayman GT4 Clubsport | 718 | (Italy) Massimiliano Busnelli | PA | All |
| (Switzerland) Porsche Centri Ticino | Porsche 718 Cayman GT4 Clubsport | 718 | (Switzerland) Ivan Jacoma | PA | All |
| (Switzerland) Porsche Centri Ticino | Porsche 718 Cayman GT4 Clubsport | 911 | (Switzerland) Christian De Kant | PA | 1–3 |
| (Switzerland) Porsche Centri Ticino | Porsche 718 Cayman GT4 Clubsport | 911 | (Italy) Antonio Spavone | PA | 1–3 |
| (Switzerland) Porsche Centri Ticino | Porsche 718 Cayman GT4 Clubsport | 992 | (Switzerland) Amedeo Pampanini | S | 1–2 |
| (Switzerland) Porsche Centri Ticino | Porsche 718 Cayman GT4 Clubsport | 992 | (Switzerland) Nicolas Sturzinger | S | 1–2 |

| Icon | Class |
|---|---|
| S | Silver Cup |
| PA | Pro-Am Cup |
| Am | Am Cup |

== Race calendar and results ==
Bold indicates the overall winner.

| Round | | Circuit | Date | Pole position | Silver Winners | Pro-Am Winners | Am Winners |
|---|---|---|---|---|---|---|---|
| 1 | R1 | (Italy) Monza | 17 April | (Germany) No. 22 Allied Racing | **(United Kingdom) No. 23 United Autosports** | (Switzerland) No. 718 Porsche Centri Ticino | (France) No. 3 TGR CMR |
| 1 | R1 | (Italy) Monza | 17 April | (Denmark) Nicolaj Møller-Madsen (Germany) Joel Sturm | **(United Kingdom) Charlie Fagg** **(United Kingdom) Bailey Voisin** | (Italy) Massimiliano Busnelli (Switzerland) Ivan Jacoma | (France) Andrea Benezet (France) Wilfried Cazalbon |
| 1 | R2 | (Italy) Monza | 18 April | (United Kingdom) No. 32 United Autosports | **(United Kingdom) No. 23 United Autosports** | (France) No. 42 Saintéloc Racing | (Italy) No. 76 Autorlando Sport |
| 1 | R2 | (Italy) Monza | 18 April | (United Kingdom) Gus Bowers (United Kingdom) Dean MacDonald | **(United Kingdom) Charlie Fagg** **(United Kingdom) Bailey Voisin** | (France) Grégory Guilvert (France) Fabien Michal | (Italy) Giuseppe Ghezzi (Italy) Alessandro Giovanelli |
| 2 | R1 | (France) Paul Ricard | 29 May | (Spain) No. 15 NM Racing Team | **(Spain) No. 15 NM Racing Team** | (France) No. 42 Saintéloc Racing | (France) No. 89 AGS Events |
| 2 | R1 | (France) Paul Ricard | 29 May | (Spain) Lluc Ibáñez (Spain) Xavier Lloveras | **(Spain) Lluc Ibáñez** **(Spain) Xavier Lloveras** | (France) Grégory Guilvert (France) Fabien Michal | (France) Nicolas Gomar (France) Eric Herr |
| 2 | R2 | (France) Paul Ricard | 30 May | (France) No. 42 Saintéloc Racing | **(France) No. 8 TGR CMR** | (France) No. 42 Saintéloc Racing | (France) No. 69 Full Motorsport |
| 2 | R2 | (France) Paul Ricard | 30 May | (France) Grégory Guilvert (France) Fabien Michal | **(Belgium) Stéphane Lémeret** **(Belgium) Antoine Potty** | (France) Grégory Guilvert (France) Fabien Michal | (France) Michael Blanchemain (France) Christophe Hamon |
| 3 | R1 | (Netherlands) Zandvoort | 19 June | (Germany) No. 22 Allied Racing | **(France) No. 27 AGS Events** | (France) No. 42 Saintéloc Racing | (France) No. 69 Full Motorsport |
| 3 | R1 | (Netherlands) Zandvoort | 19 June | (Denmark) Nicolaj Møller-Madsen (Germany) Joel Sturm | **(France) César Gazeau** **(Switzerland) Konstantin Lachenauer** | (France) Grégory Guilvert (France) Fabien Michal | (France) Michael Blanchemain (France) Christophe Hamon |
| 3 | R2 | (Netherlands) Zandvoort | 20 June | (France) No. 87 AKKA ASP | (France) No. 88 AKKA ASP | **(France) No. 87 AKKA ASP** | (France) No. 3 TGR CMR |
| 3 | R2 | (Netherlands) Zandvoort | 20 June | (France) Jean-Luc Beaubelique (France) Jim Pla | (France) Timothé Buret (France) Paul Evrard | **(France) Jean-Luc Beaubelique** **(France) Jim Pla** | (France) Andrea Benezet (France) Wilfried Cazalbon |
| 4 | R1 | (Belgium) Spa-Francorchamps | 30 July | **(United Kingdom)** No. 23 United Autosports | **(United Kingdom) No. 23 United Autosports** | (Switzerland) No. 718 Porsche Centri Ticino | (Turkey) No. 12 Borusan Otomotiv Motorsport |
| 4 | R1 | (Belgium) Spa-Francorchamps | 30 July | (United Kingdom) Charlie Fagg (United Kingdom) Bailey Voisin | **(United Kingdom) Charlie Fagg** **(United Kingdom) Bailey Voisin** | (Italy) Massimiliano Busnelli (Switzerland) Ivan Jacoma | (Turkey) Berkay Besler (Turkey) Cem Bölükbaşı |
| 4 | R2 | (Belgium) Spa-Francorchamps | 31 July | (France) No. 55 Mirage Racing | (Germany) **No. 22 Allied Racing** | (France) No. 42 Saintéloc Racing | (Turkey) No. 12 Borusan Otomotiv Motorsport |
| 4 | R2 | (Belgium) Spa-Francorchamps | 31 July | (United Kingdom) Tom Canning (Netherlands) Ruben del Sarte | **(Denmark) Nicolaj Møller-Madsen** **(Germany) Joel Sturm** | (France) Grégory Guilvert (France) Fabien Michal | (Turkey) Berkay Besler (Turkey) Cem Bölükbaşı |
| 5 | R1 | (Germany) Nürburgring | 4 September | **(United Kingdom)** No. 23 United Autosports | (Germany) **No. 13 Team Zakspeed** | (France) No. 42 Saintéloc Racing | (France) No. 69 Full Motorsport |
| 5 | R1 | (Germany) Nürburgring | 4 September | (United Kingdom) Charlie Fagg (United Kingdom) Bailey Voisin | **(Germany) Jan Marschalkowski** **(France) Théo Nouet** | (France) Grégory Guilvert (France) Fabien Michal | (France) Michael Blanchemain (France) Christophe Hamon |
| 5 | R2 | (Germany) Nürburgring | 5 September | (United Kingdom) No. 32 United Autosports | (United Kingdom) **No. 32 United Autosports** | (Germany) No. 26 Allied Racing | (France) No. 69 Full Motorsport |
| 5 | R2 | (Germany) Nürburgring | 5 September | (United Kingdom) Gus Bowers (United Kingdom) Dean MacDonald | **(United Kingdom) Gus Bowers** **(United Kingdom) Dean MacDonald** | (Switzerland) Joël Camathias (Germany) Alexander Hartvig | (France) Michael Blanchemain (France) Christophe Hamon |
| 6 | R1 | (Spain) Barcelona | 9 October | (France) No. 30 CMR | **(France)** No. 8 TGR CMR | (France) **No. 42 Saintéloc Racing** | (France) No. 69 Full Motorsport |
| 6 | R1 | (Spain) Barcelona | 9 October | (France) Vincent Beltoise (France) Loris Cabirou | (Belgium) Stéphane Lémeret (Belgium) Antoine Potty | **(France) Grégory Guilvert** **(France) Fabien Michal** | (France) Michael Blanchemain (France) Christophe Hamon |
| 6 | R2 | (Spain) Barcelona | 10 October | (France) No. 87 AKKA ASP | (Germany) **No. 22 Allied Racing** | (France) No. 87 AKKA ASP | (France) No. 69 Full Motorsport |
| 6 | R2 | (Spain) Barcelona | 10 October | (France) Jean-Luc Beaubelique (France) Jim Pla | **(Denmark) Bastian Buus** **(Germany) Joel Sturm** | (France) Jean-Luc Beaubelique (France) Jim Pla | (France) Michael Blanchemain (France) Christophe Hamon |

== Championship standings ==
Scoring system

Championship points were awarded for the first ten positions in each race. After Q1 and Q2 the drivers of the car setting the fastest time in the Silver, Pro-Am and Am Cups will be awarded one point. Entries were required to complete 75% of the winning car's race distance in order to be classified and earn points. Individual drivers were required to participate for a minimum of 25 minutes in order to earn championship points in any race.

| Position | **1st** | **2nd** | **3rd** | **4th** | **5th** | **6th** | **7th** | **8th** | **9th** | **10th** | **Pole** |
| Points | 25 | 18 | 15 | 12 | 10 | 8 | 6 | 4 | 2 | 1 | 1 |

=== Drivers' championship ===
| Pos. | Drivers | Team | MNZ (Italy) | | LEC (France) | | ZAN (Netherlands) | | SPA (Belgium) | | NÜR (Germany) | | BAR (Spain) | | Points |
Silver Cup
| 1 | (United Kingdom) Charlie Fagg (United Kingdom) Bailey Voisin | (United Kingdom) United Autosports | 1 | 1 | 3 | 6 | 10 | **7** | **1** | 4 | **2** | 2 | 10 | 10 | 193 |
| 2 | (Belgium) Stéphane Lémeret (Belgium) Antoine Potty | (France) CMR | 2 | 2 | 2 | 1 | 5 | 5 | 4 | 3 | Ret | Ret | 2 | 13 | 159 |
| 3 | (Netherlands) Thijmen Nabuurs (Netherlands) Jop Rappange | (Netherlands) V8 Racing | Ret | WD | 4 | 4 | 4 | 17 | 13 | 13 | 4 | 4 | 4 | 4 | 109 |
| 4 | (Spain) Lluc Ibáñez (Spain) Xavier Lloveras | (Spain) NM Racing Team | Ret | 6 | **1** | 36 | 11 | 4 | 8 | 9 | 10 | 6 | 16 | 11 | 97 |
| 5 | (United Kingdom) Gus Bowers (United Kingdom) Dean MacDonald | (United Kingdom) United Autosports | 4 | **8** | 31 | 8 | Ret | 19 | 14 | 6 | 3 | 1 | 12 | 15 | 95 |
| 6 | (Germany) Joel Sturm | (Germany) Allied Racing | **31** | 15 | 6 | 13 | **3** | 12 | Ret | 1 | Ret | 28† | 28 | 1 | 87 |
| 7 | (France) Vincent Beltoise (France) Loris Cabirou | (France) CMR | 39 | 9 | 5 | 2 | 37 | 28 | 3 | 2 | 32† | Ret | Ret | 6 | 82 |
| 8 | (United Kingdom) Tom Canning (Netherlands) Ruben del Sarte | (France) Mirage Racing | 6 | Ret | 12 | 12 | 8 | 16 | 9 | 5 | 6 | 26† | 6 | 7 | 71 |
| 9 | (France) César Gazeau (Switzerland) Konstantin Lachenauer | (France) AGS Events | 25 | 7 | 8 | 7 | 1 | 13 | Ret | 17 | 16 | 19 | Ret | 8 | 69 |
| 10 | (France) Timothé Buret (France) Paul Evrard | (France) AKKA ASP | 32 | 37 | 7 | 9 | 32 | 3 | 2 | 18 | 11 | 13 | 17 | 14 | 67 |
| 11 | (Denmark) Nicolaj Møller-Madsen | (Germany) Allied Racing | **31** | 15 | 6 | 13 | **3** | 12 | Ret | 1 | Ret | 28† | | | 62 |
| 12 | (France) Robert Consani (France) Benjamin Lariche | (France) Team Speedcar | 11 | 14 | 10 | 11 | 15 | 15 | 12 | 10 | 5 | 9 | 37† | 9 | 55 |
| 13 | (France) Sébastien Baud (France) Enzo Joulié | (Spain) CD Sport | 22 | 10 | 36 | 10 | 7 | 10 | Ret | 30 | 19 | 24 | 22 | 33† | 34 |
| 14 | (Turkey) Berkay Besler (Turkey) Cem Bölükbaşı | (Turkey) Borusan Otomotiv Motorsport | | | | | | | | | 7 | 14 | 3 | 32† | 30 |
| 15 | (Israel) Roee Meyuhas (Luxembourg) Clement Seyler | (France) Saintéloc Racing | 13 | 23 | 18 | 18 | 17 | 21 | 34 | 37† | 9 | 27† | 24 | **5** | 30 |
| 16 | (Switzerland) Jean-Luc D'Auria | (Italy) Trivellato Racing by Villorba Corse | Ret | WD | 11 | 35 | 9 | 8 | 5 | 35† | Ret | Ret | 39† | 17 | 27 |
| 16 | (United Kingdom) Jamie Caroline | (Italy) Trivellato Racing by Villorba Corse | Ret | WD | 11 | 35 | 9 | 8 | 5 | 35† | Ret | Ret | | | |
| 17 | (Denmark) Bastian Buus | (Germany) Allied Racing | | | | | | | | | | | 28 | 1 | 25 |
| 18 | (France) Edouard Cauhaupe (France) Hugo Chevalier | (Spain) CD Sport | | | | | | | | | Ret | 5 | | | 12 |
| 19 | (Italy) Francesco Guerra | (Italy) Trivellato Racing by Villorba Corse | 15 | 30 | Ret | 20 | 16 | 18 | 29 | Ret | | | 39† | 17 | 6 |
| 19 | (Italy) Jody Vullo | (Italy) Trivellato Racing by Villorba Corse | 15 | 30 | Ret | 20 | 16 | 18 | 29 | Ret | | | | | 6 |
| 20 | (France) Hugo Condé | (France) AGS Events | Ret | 35 | Ret | 28 | 27 | 20 | 22 | 36† | | | 21 | 23 | 2 |
| 20 | (France) Hugo Roch | (France) AGS Events | | | | | | | | | | | 21 | 23 | 2 |
| 21 | (Switzerland) Amedeo Pampanini (Switzerland) Nicolas Sturzinger | (Switzerland) Porsche Centri Ticino | Ret | 21 | 25 | 30 | | | | | | | | | 1 |
Pro-Am Cup
| 1 | (France) Grégory Guilvert (France) Fabien Michal | (France) Saintéloc Racing | 7 | 3 | **9** | **3** | **2** | 2 | | | | | | | 136 |
| 2 | (France) Jean-Luc Beaubelique (France) Jim Pla | (France) AKKA ASP | 8 | 22 | 16 | 5 | 13 | **1** | | | | | | | 86 |
| 3 | (Italy) Massimiliano Busnelli (Switzerland) Ivan Jacoma | (Switzerland) Porsche Centri Ticino | **3** | Ret | 15 | 16 | 12 | 9 | | | | | | | 78 |
| 4 | (Italy) Luca Bosco | (Belgium) Selleslagh Racing Team | 14 | 17 | 17 | 15 | 6 | 6 | | | | | | | 69 |
| 5 | (Turkey) Berkay Besler (Turkey) Cem Bölükbaşı | (Turkey) Borusan Otomotiv Motorsport | 10 | 4 | WD | WD | 14 | 14 | | | | | | | 44 |
| 6 | (France) Eric Clément (France) Romain Iannetta | (France) Full Motorsport | 5 | 5 | 23 | 26 | 21 | 35 | | | | | | | 43 |
| 7 | (Belgium) O'Neill Muth | (Belgium) Selleslagh Racing Team | 14 | 17 | 17 | 15 | | | | | | | | | 36 |
| 8 | (France) Pierre Courroye (France) Thomas Hodier | (France) Team Speedcar | 21 | DNS | 13 | 14 | WD | WD | | | | | | | 33 |
| 9 | (Netherlands) Olivier Hart | (Belgium) Selleslagh Racing Team | | | | | 6 | 6 | | | | | | | 33 |
| 10 | (Germany) Constantin Dressler (Germany) Dennis Fetzer | (Germany) Allied Racing | 9 | Ret | 24 | 17 | 19 | Ret | | | | | | | 26 |
| 11 | (France) Stephan Guérin (France) Antoine Leclerc | (France) Arkadia Racing | 19 | 12 | 19 | Ret | 24 | 30 | | | | | | | 23 |
| 12 | (Spain) Filip Vava (Spain) Rafael Villanueva | (Spain) NM Racing Team | 20 | 31 | 22 | 21 | 18 | 25 | | | | | | | 22 |
| 13 | (France) Hugo Chevalier (France) Jean-Ludovic Foubert | (Spain) CD Sport | Ret | 32 | Ret | 19 | 36 | 11 | | | | | | | 16 |
| 14 | (Switzerland) Joël Camathias (Germany) Alexander Hartvig | (Germany) Allied Racing | 12 | 36 | Ret | DNS | 31 | 22 | | | | | | | 12 |
| 15 | (Switzerland) Christian De Kant (Italy) Antonio Spavone | (Switzerland) Porsche Centri Ticino | 35 | 20 | 26 | 32 | 33 | 31 | | | | | | | 9 |
| 16 | (Germany) Christian Gisy (Germany) Ralf Kelleners | (Germany) Hella Pagid - racing one | 26 | 27 | 30 | 29 | 26 | 27 | | | | | | | 5 |
| 17 | (Poland) Antoni Chodzen (Poland) Piotr Chodzen | (Italy) SVC Sport Management | 24 | 24 | | | | | | | | | | | 4 |
| 18 | (France) Grégory Faessel-Curson (France) Nyls Stievenart | (France) Saintéloc Racing | 34 | 28 | | | 22 | 36 | | | | | | | 3 |
| 19 | (Turkey) Yagiz Gedik (Turkey) Hasan Tansu | (Turkey) Borusan Otomotiv Motorsport | 16 | 33 | WD | WD | 25 | 34 | | | | | | | 2 |
| 20 | (Italy) Paolo Gnemmi (Italy) Riccardo Pera | (Italy) Ebimotors | Ret | **WD** | | | | | | | | | | | 1 |
| | (Germany) Richard Distl (Germany) Alexander Woller | (Germany) Team GT | | | 33 | 38 | | | | | | | | | 0 |
| | (Germany) Bernhard Laber (Switzerland) Alain Valente | (Germany) Team GT | | | WD | WD | | | | | | | | | 0 |
Am Cup
| 1 | (France) Michael Blanchemain (France) Christophe Hamon | (France) Full Motorsport | 18 | 19 | 20 | 22 | 20 | 33 | | | | | | | 104 |
| 2 | (France) Andrea Benezet (France) Wilfried Cazalbon | (France) TGR CMR | 17 | 34 | Ret | **23** | 23 | 23 | | | | | | | 89 |
| 3 | (San Marino) Paolo Meloni (Italy) Massimiliano Tresoldi | (San Marino) W&D Racing Team | 28 | 16 | 21 | 25 | 30 | 32 | | | | | | | 72 |
| 4 | (France) Nicolas Gomar (France) Eric Herr | (France) AGS Events | 33 | Ret | **14** | 24 | **34** | 26 | | | | | | | 69 |
| 5 | (France) Benjamin Ricci (France) Mauro Ricci | (France) AKKA ASP | 29 | Ret | 27 | 27 | 29 | **24** | | | | | | | 61 |
| 6 | (Switzerland) Pascal Bachmann (Belgium) Paul Theysgens | (Belgium) Street Art Racing | 38 | 26 | 29 | 34 | 28 | 29 | | | | | | | 45 |
| 7 | (Italy) Giuseppe Ghezzi (Italy) Alessandro Giovanelli | (Italy) Autorlando Sport | 27 | 11 | | | | | | | | | | | 37 |
| 8 | (Germany) Markus Lungstrass (Denmark) Henrik Lyngbye Pedersen | (Germany) Hella Pagid - racing one | **30** | 13 | 35 | 37 | 35 | WD | | | | | | | 35 |
| 9 | (Belgium) Sven van Laere (Belgium) Johan Vannerum | (Belgium) Selleslagh Racing Team | 37 | 18 | 32 | 33 | | | | | | | | | 25 |
| 10 | (Italy) Riccardo Canzian (Italy) Dario Cerati | (Italy) Autorlando Sport | 23 | **29** | | | | | | | | | | | 20 |
| 11 | (France) Grégory Faessel-Curson (France) Evens Stievenart | (France) Saintéloc Racing | | | 34 | 31 | | | | | | | | | 12 |
| 12 | (Poland) Antoni Chodzen (Poland) Piotr Chodzen | (Italy) SVC Sport Management | | | 28 | Ret | | | | | | | | | 10 |
| 13 | (Russia) Andrey Solukovtsev | (Russia) Iskra Motorsport by Ebimotors | 36 | 25 | | | | | | | | | | | 10 |
| Pos. | Drivers | Team | MNZ (Italy) | | LEC (France) | | ZAN (Netherlands) | | SPA (Belgium) | | NÜR (Germany) | | BAR (Spain) | | Points |

Key
| Colour | Result |
|---|---|
| Gold | Race winner |
| Silver | 2nd place |
| Bronze | 3rd place |
| Green | Points finish |
| Blue | Non-points finish |
| Blue | Non-classified finish (NC) |
| Purple | Did not finish (Ret) |
| Black | Disqualified (DSQ) |
| Black | Excluded (EX) |
| White | Did not start (DNS) |
| White | Race cancelled (C) |
| White | Withdrew (WD) |
| Blank | Did not participate |

**Bold** – Pole
Italics – Fastest Lap

=== Team's championship ===
Championship points were awarded for the first ten positions in each race. After Q1 and Q2 the Team of the car setting the fastest time in the Silver, Pro-Am and Am Cups will be awarded one point. For the Teams titles Silver, Pro-Am and Am, only the highest-finishing car per Team will score points; all other cars entered by that Team will be invisible as far as scoring points are concerned.

| Position | **1st** | **2nd** | **3rd** | **4th** | **5th** | **6th** | **7th** | **8th** | **9th** | **10th** | **Pole** |
| Points | 25 | 18 | 15 | 12 | 10 | 8 | 6 | 4 | 2 | 1 | 1 |

==== Silver Cup ====
| Pos. | Team | Manufacturer | MNZ (Italy) | | LEC (France) | | ZAN (Netherlands) | | SPA (Belgium) | NÜR (Germany) | BAR (Spain) | Points |
|---|---|---|---|---|---|---|---|---|---|---|---|---|
| 1 | (France) CMR | Toyota | 2 | 2 | 2 | 1 | 5 | 5 | | | | 106 |
| 2 | (United Kingdom) United Autosports | McLaren | 1 | **1** | 3 | **6** | 10 | **7** | | | | 99 |
| 3 | (France) AGS Events | Aston Martin | 25 | 7 | 8 | 7 | 1 | 13 | | | | 63 |
| 4 | (Spain) NM Racing Team | Mercedes-AMG | Ret | 6 | **1** | 36 | 11 | 4 | | | | 61 |
| 5 | (Germany) Allied Racing | Porsche | **31** | 15 | 6 | 13 | **3** | 12 | | | | 46 |
| 6 | (Netherlands) V8 Racing | Chevrolet | Ret | WD | 4 | 4 | 4 | 17 | | | | 45 |
| 7 | (France) AKKA ASP | Mercedes-AMG | 32 | Ret | 7 | 9 | 32 | 3 | | | | 44 |
| 8 | (Spain) CD Sport | Mercedes-AMG | 22 | 10 | 36 | 10 | 7 | 10 | | | | 42 |
| 9 | (France) Team Speedcar | Audi | 11 | 14 | 10 | 11 | 15 | 15 | | | | 33 |
| 10 | (France) Mirage Racing | Aston Martin | 6 | Ret | 12 | 12 | 8 | 16 | | | | 29 |
| 11 | (Italy) Trivellato Racing by Villorba Corse | Mercedes-AMG | 15 | 30 | 11 | 20 | 9 | 8 | | | | 27 |
| 12 | (France) Saintéloc Racing | Audi | 13 | 23 | 18 | 18 | 17 | 21 | | | | 13 |
| 13 | (Switzerland) Centri Porsche Ticino | Porsche | Ret | 21 | 25 | 30 | | | | | | 4 |
| Pos. | Team | Manufacturer | MNZ (Italy) | | LEC (France) | | ZAN (Netherlands) | | SPA (Belgium) | NÜR (Germany) | BAR (Spain) | Points |

==== Pro-Am ====
| Pos. | Team | Manufacturer | MNZ (Italy) | | LEC (France) | | ZAN (Netherlands) | | SPA (Belgium) | NÜR (Germany) | BAR (Spain) | Points |
|---|---|---|---|---|---|---|---|---|---|---|---|---|
| 1 | (France) Saintéloc Racing | Audi | 7 | 3 | **9** | **3** | **2** | 2 | | | | 136 |
| 2 | (Switzerland) Centri Porsche Ticino | Porsche | **3** | 20 | 15 | 16 | 12 | 9 | | | | 86 |
| 3 | (France) AKKA ASP | Mercedes-AMG | 8 | 22 | 16 | 5 | 13 | **1** | | | | 86 |
| 4 | (Belgium) Selleslagh Racing Team | Mercedes-AMG | 14 | 17 | 17 | 15 | 6 | 6 | | | | 71 |
| 5 | (Turkey) Borusan Otomotiv Motorsport | BMW | 10 | 4 | WD | WD | 14 | 14 | | | | 44 |
| 6 | (France) Team Fullmotorsport | Audi | 5 | 5 | 23 | 26 | 21 | 35 | | | | 39 |
| 7 | (France) Team Speedcar | Audi | 21 | DNS | 13 | 14 | WD | WD | | | | 34 |
| 8 | (Germany) Allied Racing | Porsche | 9 | 36 | 24 | 17 | 19 | 22 | | | | 32 |
| 9 | (France) Arkadia Racing | Alpine | 19 | 12 | 19 | Ret | 24 | 30 | | | | 27 |
| 10 | (Spain) NM Racing Team | Mercedes-AMG | 20 | 31 | 22 | 21 | 18 | 25 | | | | 25 |
| 11 | (Spain) CD Sport | Mercedes-AMG | Ret | 32 | Ret | 19 | 36 | 11 | | | | 16 |
| 12 | (Germany) Hella Pagid - racing one | Audi | 26 | 27 | 30 | 29 | 26 | 27 | | | | 7 |
| 13 | (Italy) SVC Sport Management | Toyota | 24 | 24 | | | | | | | | 4 |
| 14 | (Italy) Ebimotors | Porsche | Ret | **WD** | | | | | | | | 1 |
| 15 | (Germany) Team GT | McLaren | | | 11 | 38 | | | | | | 0 |
| Pos. | Team | Manufacturer | MNZ (Italy) | | LEC (France) | | ZAN (Netherlands) | | SPA (Belgium) | NÜR (Germany) | BAR (Spain) | Points |

==== Am ====
| Pos. | Team | Manufacturer | MNZ (Italy) | | LEC (France) | | ZAN (Netherlands) | | SPA (Belgium) | NÜR (Germany) | BAR (Spain) | Points |
|---|---|---|---|---|---|---|---|---|---|---|---|---|
| 1 | (France) Team Fullmotorsport | Audi | 18 | 19 | 20 | 22 | 20 | 33 | | | | 104 |
| 2 | (France) CMR | Toyota | 17 | 34 | Ret | **23** | 23 | 23 | | | | 91 |
| 3 | (San Marino) W&D Racing Team | BMW | 28 | 16 | 21 | 25 | 30 | 32 | | | | 74 |
| 4 | (France) AGS Events | Aston Martin | 33 | Ret | **14** | 24 | **34** | 26 | | | | 71 |
| 5 | (France) AKKA ASP | Mercedes-AMG | 28 | Ret | 27 | 27 | 29 | **24** | | | | 63 |
| 6 | (Belgium) Street Art Racing | Aston Martin | 38 | 26 | 29 | 34 | 28 | 29 | | | | 46 |
| 7 | (Italy) Autorlando Sport | Porsche | 23 | **11** | | | | | | | | 41 |
| 8 | (Germany) Hella Pagid - racing one | Aston Martin | **30** | 13 | 35 | 37 | 35 | WD | | | | 37 |
| 9 | (Belgium) Selleslagh Racing Team | Mercedes-AMG | 37 | 18 | 32 | 33 | | | | | | 26 |
| 10 | (Italy) Ebimotors | Porsche | 36 | 25 | | | | | | | | 12 |
| 11 | (France) Saintéloc Racing | Audi | | | 34 | 31 | | | | | | 12 |
| 12 | (Italy) SVC Sport Management | Toyota | | | 28 | Ret | | | | | | 10 |
| Pos. | Team | Manufacturer | MNZ (Italy) | | LEC (France) | | ZAN (Netherlands) | | SPA (Belgium) | NÜR (Germany) | BAR (Spain) | Points |
