= Matmut =

French mutual insurance company

- Type: Private
- Website: https://www.matmut.fr/

Matmut, an acronym for "Mutuelle assurance des travailleurs mutualistes", is a French mutual insurance company.

== History ==
The founding general assembly of the Mutuelle d'assurance des travailleurs mutualistes was held in Rouen on July 7, 1961.

In 2011, the company introduced an offer aimed at associations.

On November 1, 2025, the company HSBC Vie was renamed KOREGE by Matmut.
