= Joel Sturm =

German racing driver (born 2001)

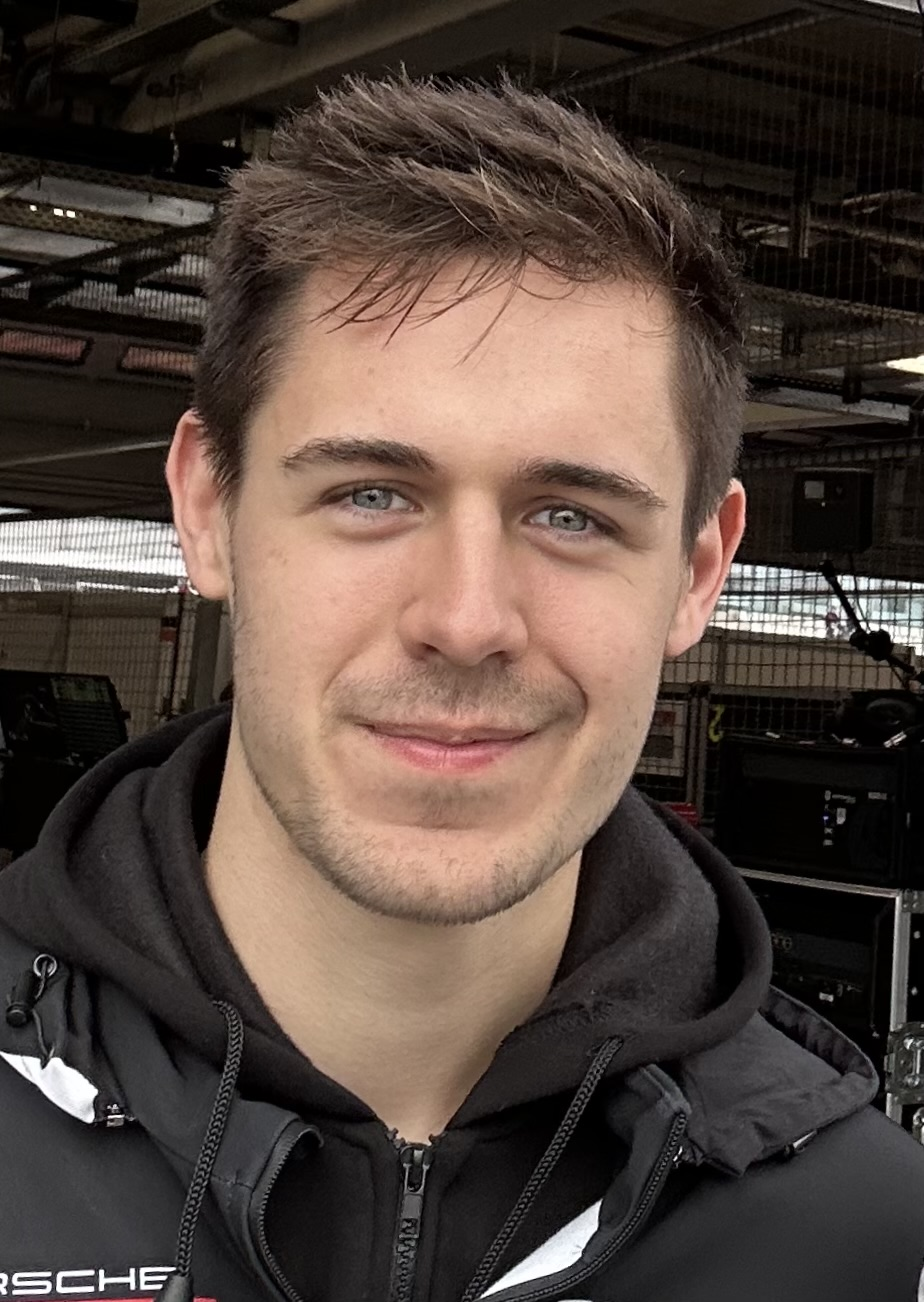
- Sturm at the Nürburgring in 2024
- Nationality: (Germany) German
- Born: 29 November 2001 (age 24) Brühl, Germany

FIA World Endurance Championship career
- Debut season: 2024
- Current team: Manthey Pure Rxcing
- Categorisation: FIA Silver (until 2024); FIA Gold (2025–)
- Car number: 92
- Starts: 8 (8 entries)
- Wins: 2
- Podiums: 4
- Poles: 0
- Fastest laps: 0
- Best finish: 1st (LMGT3) in 2024

Championship titles
- 2023–24: AsLMS - GT

Joel Sturm (born 29 November 2001) is a German racing driver. He was the 2024 FIA World Endurance Championship LMGT3 champion, driving for Manthey Pure Rxcing.

== Early career ==
=== GT4 ===
Having begun his career in karts at the age of eight, Sturm progressed into racing cars in 2020, driving for Allied-Racing in the ADAC GT4 Germany. With Dennis Fetzer as his teammate, Sturm managed to score a podium at the season-finale and ended up seventh in the standings. The following year saw Sturm enter the GT4 European Series. He scored his first victory in sportscar racing at Spa-Francorchamps before winning in Barcelona, earning himself sixth place overall. Additionally, three rounds in ADAC GT4 yielded a win in Hockenheim, and Sturm finished third in class at that year's 24 Hours of Nürburgring.

== GT3 career ==
=== 2022 ===
Sturm progressed into GT3 competition in late 2021 where he drove in the final two races of the 2021 GT World Challenge Europe Endurance Cup in the Silver category with Allied, where he came 39th and 43rd in the races.

Sturm partnered up with Sven Müller to make his debut in the ADAC GT Masters where he drove for Allied Racing. The pair finished tenth in the championship, helped there by two podiums at the Nürburgring. In parallel, the German competed in the Silver Cup class of the GT World Challenge Europe Endurance Cup – also with Allied Racing – though he and his teammates would only score a best overall finish of 29th.

=== 2023 ===
After attaining one win in the Middle East Trophy and a podium in the Asian Le Mans Series over the winter, Sturm would join Pure Rxcing for a full campaign in the Bronze Cup class of the GTWC Endurance Cup, pairing up with Klaus Bachler and bronze-ranked Alex Malykhin. Despite winning the first race in class at Monza and finishing second at the 24 Hours of Spa, two retirements would jeopardise Pure Rxcing's campaign, as they finished fifth in the Bronze Cup standings. During the 2023–24 winter however, Sturm and his teammates would make good on the promise they'd shown over their European campaign, as they won the Asian Le Mans Series with two race victories and a further podium.

=== 2024 ===
The 2024 season saw Sturm, Pure Rxcing, and his 2023 teammates stepping into the newly formed LMGT3 class of the FIA World Endurance Championship, as well as fielding a Pro-rated entry in the Endurance Cup. Their season in the former started out in extraordinary fashion, as a strong opening run from Malykhin allowed Sturm and Bachler to maintain their advantage to win the Qatar 1812 km race. Two further podiums followed, as Sturm and his teammates finished third to the WRT-duo at Imola before losing out on victory in Spa to their sister car on the final lap.

At Sturm's first 24 Hours of Le Mans, his team started on pole for the race and were set to win but on hour 16 after a record-breaking four hour Safety Car, Bachler drove the car into the pit lane with a gear selection issue that took 25 minutes to fix. The stop left the car five laps down in class and undid their efforts as the trio finished the race in tenth.

The fourth round of the series – the 6 Hours of São Paulo – which was held exactly a month after Le Mans, would return on the calendar after a decade. Sturm, Malykin and Bachler bounced back after a difficult Le Mans and won the race, still dominating the top spot of the LMGT3 class.

After bagging two more second place finishes at Lone Star Le Mans and the 6 Hours of Fuji, they would clinch the LMGT3 title at Fuji just before the final round of the championship at 8 Hours of Bahrain, and finished the championship with 139 points.

At the GT World Challenge Europe Endurance Cup, they had a more difficult campaign, only getting three points finishes – two of them being eighths – and ended the pro classification in 19th with only 12 points.

Joel Sturm won the Porsche Cup, an annual award presented by Porsche AG to recognize the world's most successful privateer racing driver competing with Porsche machinery in a customer racing team, in 2024.

=== 2025 ===
Throughout the tail end of 2024 and January 2025, Sturm would defend his title in the 2024–25 Asian Le Mans Series with Manthey Racing and teammates Klaus Bachler and Antares Au. As predicted they stormed to the championship title with one win (obtained in the final race at the 2025 4 Hours of Abu Dhabi) and three podiums, – they would get podium points at the 2025 4 Hours of Dubai due to the team ahead being ineligible for them – finishing with a ten point margin to their Manthey sister car.

== Karting record ==
=== Karting career summary ===
Season	Series	Team	Position
2017	ADAC Kart Bundesendlauf - X30 Senior		25th
2018	ADAC Kart Bundesendlauf - X30 Senior		13th
2019	Kerpen Winterpokal - X30 Senior		8th
2019	Deutsche Elektro-Kart-Meisterschaft (DEKM)		
2019	ADAC Kart Masters - X30 Senioren	Fuldaer AC	24th

== Racing record ==
=== Racing career summary ===
Season	Series	Team	Races	Wins	Poles	F/Laps	Podiums	Points	Position
2020	ADAC GT4 Germany	Team Allied-Racing	12	0	0	0	1	100	7th
2021	ADAC GT4 Germany	Team Allied Racing	6	1	0	2	3	103	5th
2021	GT4 European Series - Silver	Allied Racing	12	2	2	1	3	87	6th
2021	GT World Challenge Europe Endurance Cup	Allied Racing	2	0	0	0	0	0	NC
2021	GT World Challenge Europe Endurance Cup - Silver	Allied Racing	2	0	0	0	0	0	NC
2021	24 Hours of Nürburgring - SP10	Allied Racing	1	0	0	0	1	N/A	**3rd**
2021	Nürburgring Langstrecken-Serie - V6	PROsport Racing	1	0	0	0	0	?	?
2022	ADAC GT Masters	Allied-Racing	14	0	0	0	2	106	10th
2022	GT World Challenge Europe Endurance Cup	Allied-Racing	4	0	0	0	0	0	NC
2022	GT World Challenge Europe Endurance Cup - Silver	Allied-Racing	4	0	0	0	0	10	24th
2022-23	Middle East Trophy - GT3	Pure Rxcing	2	1	0	0	1	48	6th
2023	Asian Le Mans Series - GT	Herberth Motorsport	4	0	0	0	1	31	4th
2023	GT World Challenge Europe Endurance Cup	Pure Rxcing	5	0	0	0	0	1	27th
2023	GT World Challenge Europe Endurance Cup - Bronze	Pure Rxcing	5	1	1	0	2	69	5th
2023-24	Asian Le Mans Series - GT	Pure Rxcing	5	2	0	1	3	76	**1st**
2024	FIA World Endurance Championship - LMGT3	Manthey Pure Rxcing	8	2	0	0	6	139	**1st**
2024	GT World Challenge Europe Endurance Cup	Pure Rxcing	5	0	0	0	0	12	19th
2024-25	Asian Le Mans Series - GT	Manthey Racing	6	1	0	0	3	86	**1st**
2025	Middle East Trophy - GT3	Herberth Motorsport	1	0	0	0	0	0	NC
2025	GT World Challenge Europe Endurance Cup	Herberth Motorsport	4	0	0	0	0	0	NC
2025	Nürburgring Langstrecken-Serie - SP9	Dinamic GT	4	0	0	0	0	0	NC
2025	Nürburgring Langstrecken-Serie - SP9	Falken Motorsports	4	1	0	0	2	0	NC
2025	24 Hours of Nürbugring - SP9	Dinamic GT	1	0	0	0	1	N/A	**3rd**
2025-26	24H Series Middle East - GT3	Herberth Motorsport	1	0	0	0	0	0	NC
2026	Nürburgring Langstrecken-Serie - SP9	Dinamic GT	2	0	0	0	0	0	NC
2026	24 Hours of Nürbugring - SP9	Dinamic GT	1	0	0	0	0	N/A	5th
2026	European Le Mans Series - LMGT3	Proton Competition	1	0	0	0	0	10	28th
2026	24H Series - GT3	Proton Competition	2	0	0	0	0	46	24th
2026	GT World Challenge Europe Endurance Cup	Car Collection Motorsport	2	0	0	0	0	0	NC
2026	Intercontinental GT Challenge	Dinamic GT; Car Collection Motorsport; High Class Racing	3	0	0	0	0	16	21st
2026	GT World Challenge Asia	Absolute Racing	2	0	0	0	0	8	34th

^{*} Season still in progress.

=== Complete ADAC GT4 Germany results ===
(key) (Races in bold indicate pole position) (Races in italics indicate fastest lap)

Year	Team	Car	1	2	3	4	5	6	7	8	9	10	11	12	DC	Points
2020	Team Allied-Racing	Porsche 718 Cayman GT4 Clubsport	NÜR; 1; 4	NÜR; 2; 10	HOC; 1 Ret	HOC; 2 Ret	SAC; 1; 5	SAC; 2; 14	RBR; 1; 4	RBR; 2; 9	ZAN; 1; 17	ZAN; 2; 4	OSC; 1; 5	OSC; 2; 2	7th	100
2021	Team Allied-Racing	Porsche 718 Cayman GT4 Clubsport	OSC; 1	OSC; 2	RBR; 1	RBR; 2	ZAN; 1	ZAN; 2	SAC; 1; 6	SAC; 2; 6	HOC; 1; 3	HOC; 2; 1	NÜR; 1; 6	NÜR; 2; 3	5th	103

=== Complete GT4 European Series results ===
(key) (Races in bold indicate pole position) (Races in italics indicate fastest lap)

Year	Team	Car	Class	1	2	3	4	5	6	7	8	9	10	11	12	Pos	Points
2021	Allied-Racing	Porsche 718 Cayman GT4 Clubsport	Silver	**MNZ**; **1**; 31	MNZ; 2; 15	LEC; 1; 6	LEC; 2; 13	**ZAN**; **1**; 3	ZAN; 2; 12	SPA; 1 Ret	SPA; 2; 1	NÜR; 1 Ret	NÜR; 2; 28†	CAT; 1; 28	CAT; 2; 1	6th	87

=== Complete 24 Hours of Nürburgring results ===
Year	Team	Co-drivers	Car	Class	Laps	Pos.	Class pos.
2021	(Germany) Allied-Racing	(Germany) Dennis Fetzer (Denmark) Nicolaj Møller Madsen (Germany) Luca-Sandro Trefz	Porsche 718 Cayman GT4 Clubsport	SP10	54	28	3rd
2025	(Italy) Dinamic GT	(Denmark) Bastian Buus (Italy) Matteo Cairoli (Netherlands) Loek Hartog	Porsche 911 GT3 R (992)	SP9	140	3rd	3rd
2026	(Italy) Dinamic GT	(Denmark) Bastian Buus (Denmark) Michael Christensen (Netherlands) Loek Hartog	Porsche 911 GT3 R (992.2)	SP9	155	6th	5th

=== Complete GT World Challenge Europe results ===
==== GT World Challenge Europe Endurance Cup ====
(key) (Races in bold indicate pole position) (Races in italics indicate fastest lap)

Year	Team	Car	Class	1	2	3	4	5	6	7	Pos.	Points
2021	Allied-Racing	Porsche 911 GT3 R	Silver	MON	LEC	SPA; 6H	SPA; 12H	SPA; 24H	NÜR; 39	CAT; 43	NC	0
2022	Allied-Racing	Porsche 911 GT3 R	Silver	IMO; 36	LEC; 29	SPA; 6H; 41	SPA; 12H; 33	SPA; 24H; 29	HOC; 34	CAT	24th	10
2023	Pure Rxcing	Porsche 911 GT3 R (992)	Bronze	MNZ; 15	LEC; Ret	SPA; 6H; 25	SPA; 12H; 21	SPA; 24H; 15	NÜR; 26	**CAT**; Ret	5th	69
2024	Pure Rxcing	Porsche 911 GT3 R (992)	Pro	LEC; 8	SPA; 6H; 11	SPA; 12H; 6	SPA; 24H; Ret	NÜR; 20	MNZ; 8	JED; 14	19th	12
2025	Herberth Motorsport	Porsche 911 GT3 R (992)	Gold	LEC; 20	MNZ; Ret	SPA; 6H; 50	SPA; 12H; 31	**SPA**; **24H**; 51†	NÜR; 23	CAT	10th	30
2026	Car Collection Motorsport	Porsche 911 GT3 R (992.2)	Pro-Am	LEC	MNZ	SPA; 6H; 49	SPA; 12H; 46	SPA; 24H; 39	NÜR		NC	0
2026	Car Collection Motorsport	Porsche 911 GT3 R (992.2)	Bronze							ALG; 44	NC	0

=== Complete ADAC GT Masters results ===
(key) (Races in bold indicate pole position) (Races in italics indicate fastest lap)

Year	Team	Car	1	2	3	4	5	6	7	8	9	10	11	12	13	14	DC	Points
2022	Allied-Racing	Porsche 911 GT3 R	OSC; 1 DSQ^{3}	OSC; 2; 14	RBR; 1; 4	RBR; 2; 4	ZAN; 1; 11	ZAN; 2; 5	NÜR; 1; 2	NÜR; 2; 3	LAU; 1; 15	LAU; 2; 11^{2}	SAC; 1; 16	SAC; 2; 9	HOC; 1; 12	HOC; 2; 10	10th	106

=== Complete Asian Le Mans Series results ===
(key) (Races in bold indicate pole position) (Races in italics indicate fastest lap)

Year	Team	Class	Car	Engine	1	2	3	4	5	6	Pos.	Points
2023	Herberth Motorsport	GT	Porsche 911 GT3 R	Porsche 4.0 L Flat-6	DUB; 1; 4	DUB; 2; 10	ABU; 1; 2	ABU; 2; 15			4th	31
2023–24	Pure Rxcing	GT	Porsche 911 GT3 R (992)	Porsche 4.2 L Flat-6	SEP; 1; 6	SEP; 2; 1	DUB; 1	ABU; 1 Ret	ABU; 2; 2		1st	76
2024–25	Manthey Racing	GT	Porsche 911 GT3 R (992)	Porsche 4.2 L Flat-6	SEP; 1 Ret	SEP; 2; 2	DUB; 1; 5	DUB; 2; 4	ABU; 1; 2	ABU; 2; 1	1st	86

=== Complete FIA World Endurance Championship results ===
(key) (Races in bold indicate pole position) (Races in italics indicate fastest lap)

Year	Entrant	Class	Car	Engine	1	2	3	4	5	6	7	8	Pos.	Points
2024	Manthey Pure Rxcing	LMGT3	Porsche 911 GT3 R (992)	Porsche 4.2 L Flat-6	QAT; 1	**IMO**; 3	SPA; 2	**LMS**; 10	SÃO; 1	COA; 2	FUJ; 2	BHR; 9	1st	139

^{*} Season still in progress.

=== Complete 24 Hours of Le Mans results ===
Year	Team	Co-Drivers	Car	Class	Laps	Pos.	Class Pos.
2024	(Lithuania) Manthey PureRxcing	(Austria) Klaus Bachler (Saint Kitts and Nevis) Alex Malykhin	Porsche 911 GT3 R (992)	LMGT3	273	41st	14th

=== Complete European Le Mans Series results ===
(key) (Races in bold indicate pole position; races in italics indicate fastest lap)

Year	Entrant	Class	Chassis	Engine	1	2	3	4	5	6	Rank	Points
2026	Proton Competition	LMGT3	Porsche 911 GT3 R (992.2)	Porsche 4.2 L Flat-6	CAT	LEC; 5	IMO	SPA	SIL	ALG	28th	10

Sporting positions
Preceded by Nicky Catsburg, Chandler Hull, Thomas Merrill	Asian Le Mans Series; GT Champion; 2023–24; With: Klaus Bachler & Alex Malykhin	Succeeded by Incumbent
