= Dennis Fetzer =

German racing driver (born 2001)

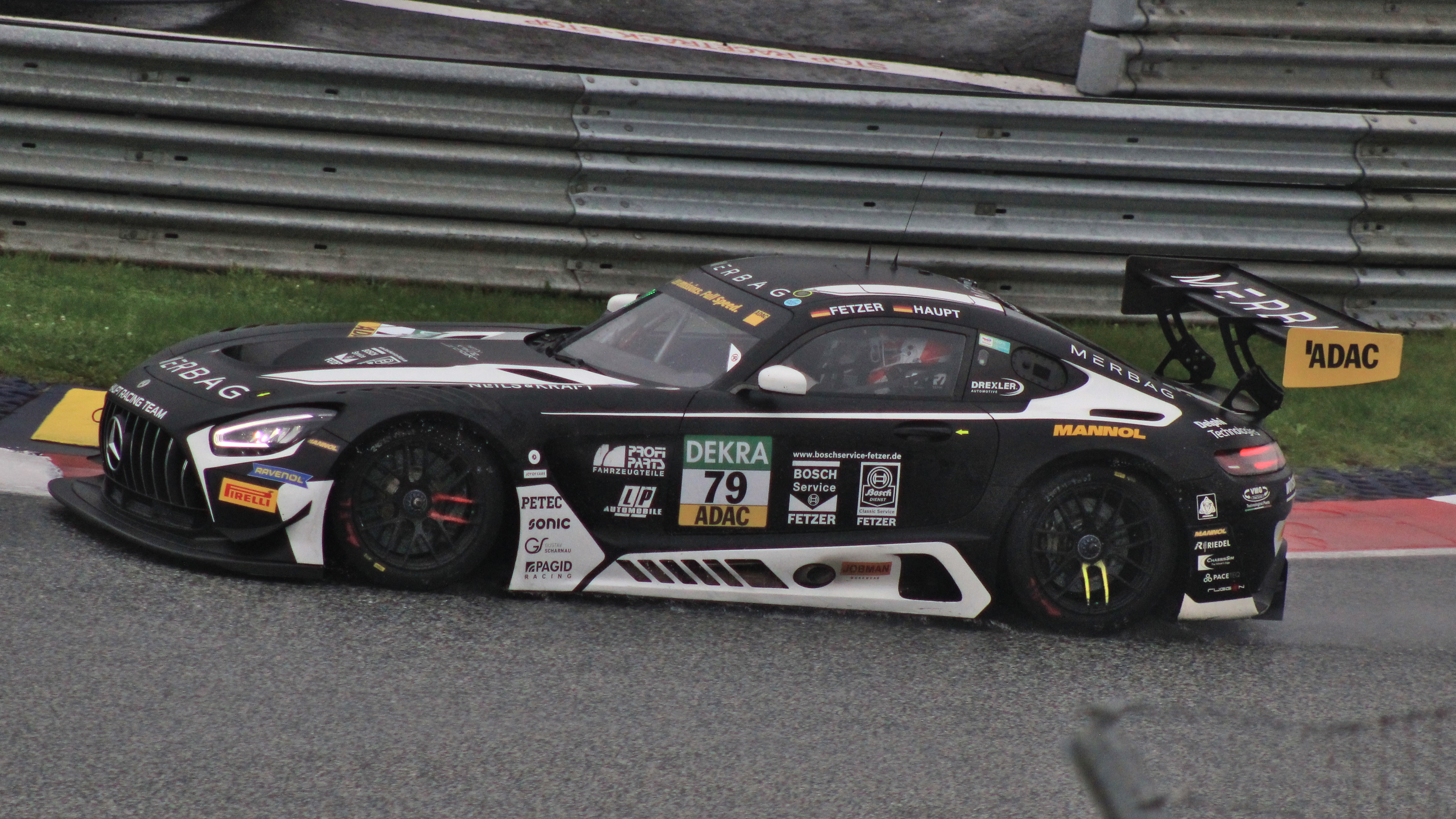
- Fetzer in 2024
- Nationality: (Germany) German
- Born: 28 May 2001 (age 25) Buseck, Germany
- Categorisation: FIA Silver

Dennis Fetzer (born 28 May 2001) is a German racing driver who last competed in the Nürburgring Langstrecken-Serie for Walkenhorst Motorsport.

== Career ==
Fetzer began karting in 2013, competing in the ADAC Youngster Cup. During his karting career, Fetzer most notably won the 2016 Rhein-Main-Kart Cup title in the DD2 category, as well as making his international debut three years later in KZ2.

During his final year of karting in 2019, Fetzer made his car racing debut, competing in the 5F class of Porsche Super Sports Cup Germany for race:pro motorsport. Remaining in Porsche machinery for 2020, Fetzer joined Allied-Racing to compete in ADAC GT4 Germany alongside Joel Sturm. In the six-race season, Fetzer took a best result of second at the Oschersleben finale to end the year seventh in points. During 2020, Fetzer also made sporadic appearances in the Nürburgring Langstrecken-Serie for PROsport Racing and Allied-Racing, as well as finishing second in the SP10 class at the 24 Hours of Nürburgring.

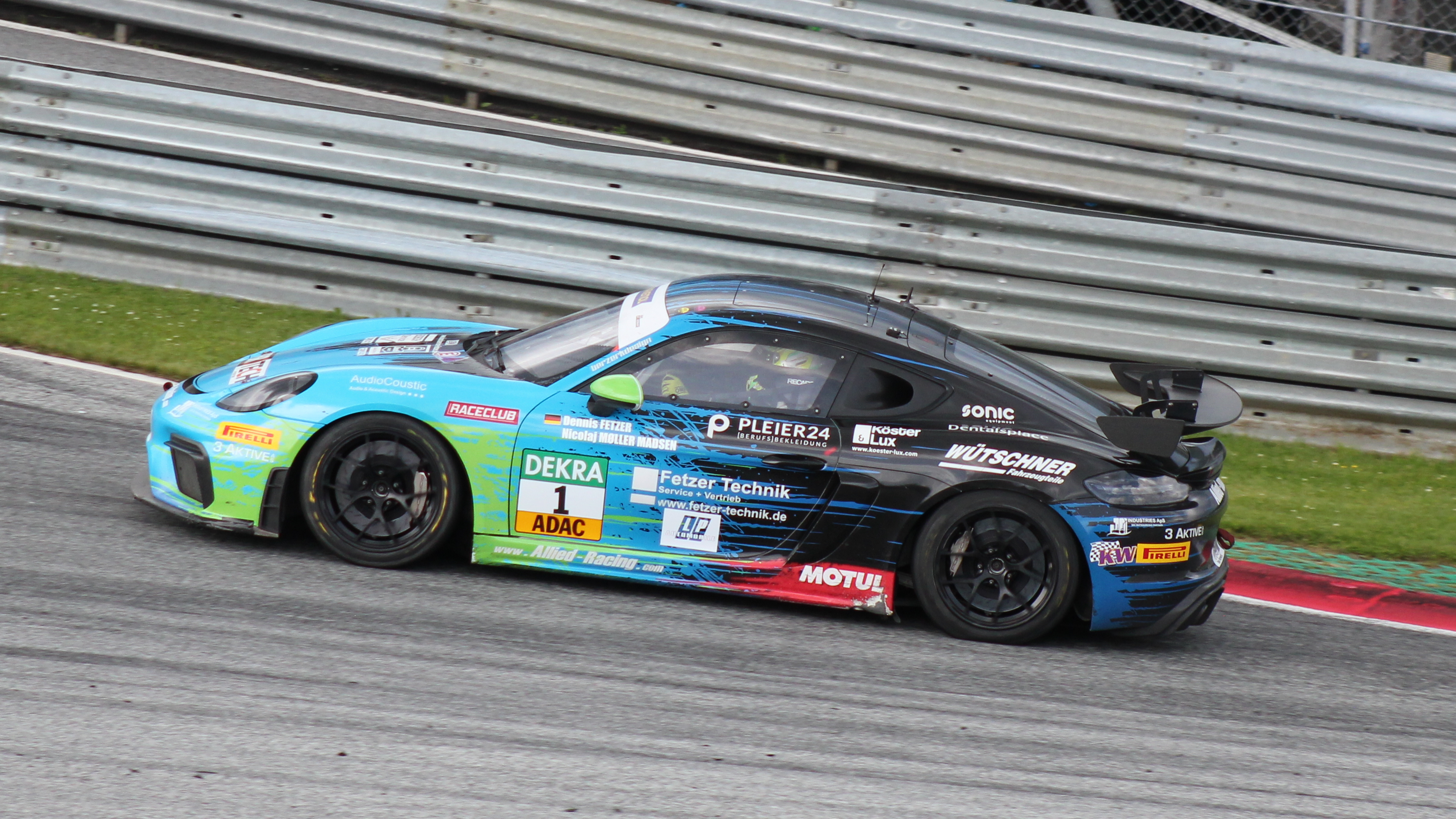
Fetzer's Allied Porsche 718 Cayman GT4 Clubsport at the Red Bull Ring in 2021.

Continuing with Allied Racing for 2021, Fetzer joined them in ADAC GT4 Germany and the Pro-Am class of the GT4 European Series. Racing in the first three rounds of both series, Fetzer most notably finished third in both Red Bull Ring races in the latter series. In September, Fetzer switched to BMW-fielding Walkenhorst Motorsport to make his GT3 debut in the NLS, and also raced at the 24 Hours of Sebring with Lamborghini-aligned Leipert Motorsport. In 2022, Fetzer primarily raced in the NLS in Audi machinery with Lionspeed, as well as making his GT World Challenge Europe Endurance Cup debut at Imola for Leipert.

Returning to Porsche machinery for 2023, Fetzer dabbled between Huber Motorsport and Falken Motorsports in the NLS, most notably scoring an overall podium with the latter at NLS6. Continuing in the NLS the following year, Fetzer switched to AMG-affiliated Haupt Racing Team, winning all four of his SP9 Pro-Am starts before switching to the Pro subclass for the rest of the season. During 2024, Fetzer also made a one-off appearance in ADAC GT Masters with the team at the Red Bull Ring. For 2025, Fetzer continued with HRT, now in a Ford Mustang GT3, to compete in both the NLS and ADAC GT Masters. In the former, Fetzer most notably scored an overall podium at NLS9, while in the latter he finished 12th in points with a best result of fourth at the Red Bull Ring. Fetzer also won the 24 Hours of Nürburgring in the SP9 Pro-Am class alongside Jusuf Owega, Salman Owega and David Schumacher on the Mustang's debut at the German enduro.

In 2026, Fetzer reunited with Walkenhorst Motorsport, now running an Aston Martin Vantage AMR GT3 Evo, for another season in the NLS and an appearance in the 24 Hours of Nürburgring, as a candidate for the Aston Martin Racing Driver Academy. After three SP9 Pro-Am podiums with Walkenhorst, Fetzer moved to BMW-fielding Gamota Racing for NLS10, in which he scored a SP9 Am podium.

== Karting record ==
=== Karting career summary ===
Season	Series	Team	Position
2019	South Garda Winter Cup – KZ2	SRP Racing Team	75th
2019	Andrea Margutti Trophy – KZ2	SRP Racing Team	NC
2019	Trofeo Delle Industrie – KZ2	SRP Racing Team	28th

== Racing record ==
=== Racing career summary ===
Season	Series	Team	Races	Wins	Poles	F/Laps	Podiums	Points	Position
2019	2ORE Endurance Champions Cup – P9	race:pro motorsport	1	0	0	0	0		
2019	Porsche Super Sports Cup Germany – 5F	race:pro motorsport	4	0	0	0	0		
2020	Nürburgring Langstrecken-Serie – V5	PROsport Racing	2	0	0	0	1	12.57	7th
2020	ADAC GT4 Germany	Team Allied-Racing	12	0	0	0	1	100	7th
2020	Nürburgring Langstrecken-Serie – SP10	Team Allied-Racing	1	0	0	0	0	0	NC
2020	24 Hours of Nürburgring – SP10	Team Allied-Racing	1	0	0	0	1	—N/a	**2nd**
2021	GT4 European Series – Pro-Am	Team Allied-Racing	6	0	0	0	0	26	17th
2021	Nürburgring Langstrecken-Serie – SP10	Team Allied-Racing	1	1	1	0	1	0	NC
2021	ADAC GT4 Germany	Team Allied-Racing	6	0	0	0	2	62	16th
2021	24 Hours of Nürburgring – SP10	Team Allied-Racing	1	0	0	0	1	—N/a	**3rd**
2021	Nürburgring Langstrecken-Serie – Cup 5	Purple Dot Racing with Walkenhorst	1	0	0	0	1	0	NC
2021	DTM Trophy	Walkenhorst Motorsport	2	0	0	0	0	6	18th
2021	Nürburgring Langstrecken-Serie – SP9 Pro	Walkenhorst Motorsport	2	0	0	0	0	0	NC
2021	24H GT Series – GT3 Am	Leipert Motorsport	1	0	0	0	0	10	NC
2022	Nürburgring Langstrecken-Serie – SP9 Pro	Lionspeed by Car Collection	3	0	0	0	0	0	NC
2022	Nürburgring Langstrecken-Serie – SP9 Pro	Huber Motorsport	1	0	0	0	0	0	NC
2022	Nürburgring Langstrecken-Serie – SP9 Pro-Am	Lionspeed by Car Collection Motorsport	1	1	0	0	1	0	NC
2022	Nürburgring Langstrecken-Serie – SP9 Pro-Am	Lionspeed by Car Collection	1	1	0	0	1	0	NC
2022	24 Hours of Nürburgring – SP9 Pro-Am	Lionspeed by Car Collection Motorsport	1	0	0	0	0	—N/a	4th
2022	GT World Challenge Europe Endurance Cup	Leipert Motorsport	1	0	0	0	0	0	NC
2022	GT World Challenge Europe Endurance Cup – Silver	Leipert Motorsport	1	0	0	0	0	0	NC
2023	Nürburgring Langstrecken-Serie – SP9 Pro-Am	Huber Motorsport	3	1	0	0	2	9	5th
2023	Nürburgring Langstrecken-Serie – SP9 Pro	Huber Motorsport	1	0	0	0	0	11	4th
2023	Nürburgring Langstrecken-Serie – SP9 Pro	Falken Motorsports	2	0	0	0	1	11	4th
2023	24 Hours of Nürburgring – SP9 Pro	Huber Motorsport	1	0	0	0	0	—N/a	DNF
2023	Porsche Endurance Trophy Nürburgring – Cup 2	Huber Motorsport	1	0	0	0	0	1	23rd
2024	Nürburgring Langstrecken-Serie – SP9 Pro-Am	Team Advan x HRT	4	4	0	0	4	0	NC
2024	Nürburgring Langstrecken-Serie – SP9 Pro	Team Advan x HRT	3	0	0	0	1	0	NC
2024	24 Hours of Nürburgring – SP9 Pro-Am	Team Advan x HRT	1	0	0	0	0	—N/a	5th
2024	Intercontinental GT Challenge	Team Advan x HRT	1	0	0	0	0	0	NC
2024	ADAC GT Masters	Haupt Racing Team	2	0	0	0	0	0	NC†
2025	Nürburgring Langstrecken-Serie – SP9 Pro	HRT Ford Performance	3	0	0	0	1	6	NC
2025	Nürburgring Langstrecken-Serie – SP9 Pro-Am	HRT Ford Performance	2	0	0	0	1	8	NC
2025	24 Hours of Nürburgring – SP9 Pro-Am	HRT Ford Performance	1	1	0	0	1	—N/a	**1st**
2025	ADAC GT Masters	Haupt Racing Team	12	0	0	0	0	92	12th
2026	Nürburgring Langstrecken-Serie – SP9 Pro-Am	Walkenhorst Motorsport	3	0	0	0	3	33	7th
2026	Nürburgring Langstrecken-Serie – SP9 Pro	Walkenhorst Motorsport	1	0	0	0	0	0	NC
2026	24 Hours of Nürburgring – SP9 Pro-Am	Walkenhorst Motorsport	1	0	0	0	0	—N/a	DNF
2026	Nürburgring Langstrecken-Serie – SP9 Am	Gamota Racing	1	0	0	0	1	8	16th

* Season still in progress.

^{†} As Fetzer was a guest driver, he was ineligible for points.

=== Complete ADAC GT4 Germany results ===
(key) (Races in bold indicate pole position) (Races in italics indicate fastest lap)

Year	Team	Car	1	2	3	4	5	6	7	8	9	10	11	12	DC	Points
2020	Team Allied-Racing	Porsche 718 Cayman GT4 Clubsport	NÜR; 1; 4	NÜR; 2; 10	HOC; 1 Ret	HOC; 2 Ret	SAC; 1; 5	SAC; 2; 14	RBR; 1; 4	RBR; 2; 9	ZAN; 1; 17	ZAN; 2; 4	OSC; 1; 5	OSC; 2; 2	7th	100
2021	Team Allied-Racing	Porsche 718 Cayman GT4 Clubsport	OSC1; 1; 6	OSC1; 2; 5	RBR; 1; 3	RBR; 2; 3	ZAN; 1; 19	ZAN; 2; 9	SAC; 1	SAC; 2	HOC; 1	HOC; 2	NÜR; 1	NÜR; 2	16th	62

=== Complete 24 Hours of Nürburgring results ===
Year	Team	Co-Drivers	Car	Class	Laps	Pos.	Class Pos.
2020	(Germany) Allied Racing	(Netherlands) Ricardo van der Ende (Denmark) Nicolaj Møller Madsen (Germany) Luca-Sandro Trefz	Porsche 718 Cayman GT4 Clubsport MR	SP10	76	27th	**2nd**
2021	(Germany) Allied Racing	(Denmark) Nicolaj Møller Madsen (Germany) Joel Sturm (Germany) Luca-Sandro Trefz	Porsche 718 Cayman GT4 Clubsport	SP10	54	28th	**3rd**
2022	(Germany) Lionspeed by Car Collection Motorsport	(Germany) Klaus Koch (Germany) Dennis Marschall (Austria) Simon Reicher	Audi R8 LMS Evo II	SP9 Pro-Am	154	13th	4th
2023	(Germany) Huber Motorsport	(France) Romain Dumas (Germany) Lars Kern (France) Côme Ledogar	Porsche 911 GT3 R (992)	SP9 Pro-Am	105	DNF	DNF
2024	(Germany) Team Advan x HRT	(Estonia) Ralf Aron (Germany) Hubert Haupt (Germany) Salman Owega	Mercedes-AMG GT3 Evo	SP9 Pro-Am	49	18th	5th
2025	(Germany) HRT Ford Performance	(Germany) Jusuf Owega (Germany) Salman Owega (Germany) David Schumacher	Ford Mustang GT3	SP9 Pro-Am	140	4th	**1st**
2026	(Germany) Walkenhorst Motorsport	(Germany) Stefan Aust (Germany) Felipe Fernández Laser (Ecuador) Mateo Villagómez	Aston Martin Vantage AMR GT3 Evo	SP9 Pro-Am	3	DNF	DNF

=== Complete GT4 European Series results ===
(key) (Races in bold indicate pole position) (Races in italics indicate fastest lap)

Year	Team	Car	Class	1	2	3	4	5	6	7	8	9	10	11	12	Pos	Points
2021	Allied-Racing	Porsche 718 Cayman GT4 Clubsport	Pro-Am	MNZ; 1; 9	MNZ; 2 Ret	LEC; 1; 24	LEC; 2; 17	ZAN; 1; 19	ZAN; 2 Ret	SPA; 1	SPA; 2	NÜR; 1	NÜR; 2	CAT; 1	CAT; 2	17th	26

=== Complete GT World Challenge Europe results ===
==== GT World Challenge Europe Endurance Cup ====
(Races in bold indicate pole position) (Races in italics indicate fastest lap)

Year	Team	Car	Class	1	2	3	4	5	6	7	Pos.	Points
2022	Leipert Motorsport	Lamborghini Huracán GT3 Evo	Silver	IMO; Ret	LEC	SPA; 6H	SPA; 12H	SPA; 24H	HOC	CAT	NC	0

=== Complete ADAC GT Masters results ===
(key) (Races in bold indicate pole position) (Races in italics indicate fastest lap)

Year	Team	Car	1	2	3	4	5	6	7	8	9	10	11	12	DC	Points
2024	Haupt Racing Team	Mercedes-AMG GT3 Evo	OSC; 1	OSC; 2	ZAN; 1	ZAN; 2	NÜR; 1	NÜR; 2	SPA; 1	SPA; 2	RBR; 1; 5	RBR; 2; 5	HOC; 1	HOC; 2	NC	0
2025	Haupt Racing Team	Ford Mustang GT3	LAU; 1 Ret	LAU; 2; 5	ZAN; 1; 7	ZAN; 2; 9	NÜR; 1 Ret	NÜR; 2; 9	SAL; 1; 8^{1}	SAL; 2; 8	RBR; 1; 12	RBR; 2; 4^{2}	HOC; 1; 7	HOC; 2; 8	12th	92
