= 2021 ADAC GT4 Germany =

Motorsport season

The 2021 ADAC GT4 Germany season is the third season of the ADAC GT4 Germany, a sports car championship created and organised by the ADAC. The season began on 14 May at Oschersleben and ended on 7 November at the Nürburgring.

== Calendar ==
The provisional calendar was announced on the season finale of the 2020 Season. The round at Nürburgring planned in 5–7 August was postponed after massive flooding in Germany. The new date was set to 5–7 November, making its the series finale.

| Round | Circuit | Date |
|---|---|---|
| 1 | Motorsport Arena Oschersleben, Oschersleben, Germany | 14–16 May |
| 2 | Red Bull Ring, Spielberg, Austria | 11–13 June |
| 3 | Circuit Zandvoort, Zandvoort, Netherlands | 9–11 July |
| 4 | Sachsenring, Hohenstein-Ernstthal, Germany | 1–3 October |
| 5 | Hockenheimring, Hockenheim, Germany | 22–24 October |
| 6 | Nürburgring, Nürburg, Germany | 5–7 November |

== Entry list ==
| Team | Car | No. | Drivers | Class | Rounds |
|---|---|---|---|---|---|
| (Germany) Team Allied-Racing | Porsche 718 Cayman GT4 Clubsport | 1 | (Denmark) Nicolaj Møller Madsen | | 1–3 |
| (Germany) Team Allied-Racing | Porsche 718 Cayman GT4 Clubsport | 1 | (Germany) Dennis Fetzer | J | 1–3 |
| (Germany) Team Allied-Racing | Porsche 718 Cayman GT4 Clubsport | 1 | (Germany) Joel Sturm | | 4–6 |
| (Germany) Team Allied-Racing | Porsche 718 Cayman GT4 Clubsport | 1 | (Denmark) Alexander Hartvig | | 4 |
| (Germany) Team Allied-Racing | Porsche 718 Cayman GT4 Clubsport | 1 | (Germany) Paul-Aurel König | | 5–6 |
| (Germany) Team Allied-Racing | Porsche 718 Cayman GT4 Clubsport | 22 | (Germany) Moritz Wiskirchen | | All |
| (Germany) Team Allied-Racing | Porsche 718 Cayman GT4 Clubsport | 22 | (Germany) Phil Hill | | All |
| (Germany) Team Allied-Racing | Porsche 718 Cayman GT4 Clubsport | 26 | (Luxembourg) Christian Kosch | T | All |
| (Germany) Team Allied-Racing | Porsche 718 Cayman GT4 Clubsport | 26 | (Luxembourg) Tom Kieffer | T | All |
| (Switzerland) Hofor Racing by Bonk Motorsport | BMW M4 GT4 | 2 | (Germany) Michael Schrey | | All |
| (Switzerland) Hofor Racing by Bonk Motorsport | BMW M4 GT4 | 2 | (Italy) Gabriele Piana | | All |
| (Switzerland) Hofor Racing by Bonk Motorsport | BMW M4 GT4 | 3 | (Germany) Claudia Hürtgen | | 5–6 |
| (Switzerland) Hofor Racing by Bonk Motorsport | BMW M4 GT4 | 3 | (Austria) Michael Fischer | | 5–6 |
| (Switzerland) Hofor Racing by Bonk Motorsport | BMW M4 GT4 | 4 | (Germany) Christopher Rink | | 4–6 |
| (Switzerland) Hofor Racing by Bonk Motorsport | BMW M4 GT4 | 4 | (Germany) Philipp Stahlschmidt | | 4–6 |
| (Germany) Leipert Motorsport | Mercedes-AMG GT4 | 7 | (Spain) Marc de Fulgencio | J | All |
| (Germany) Leipert Motorsport | Mercedes-AMG GT4 | 7 | (Germany) Robin Falkenbach | J | All |
| (Germany) Team AVIA Sorg Rennsport | BMW M4 GT4 | 8 | (Denmark) Nicolaj Møller Madsen | | 5 |
| (Germany) Team AVIA Sorg Rennsport | BMW M4 GT4 | 8 | (Finland) Philipp Miemois | | 5 |
| (Bulgaria) Overdrive Racing | Porsche 718 Cayman GT4 Clubsport | 9 | (Bulgaria) Tano Neumann | T | All |
| (Bulgaria) Overdrive Racing | Porsche 718 Cayman GT4 Clubsport | 9 | (Germany) Joachim Bölting | T | All |
| (Bulgaria) Overdrive Racing | Porsche 718 Cayman GT4 Clubsport | 23 | (Bulgaria) Pavel Lefterov | | 1–2, 4–6 |
| (Bulgaria) Overdrive Racing | Porsche 718 Cayman GT4 Clubsport | 23 | (Bulgaria) Stefan Bostandjiev | J | 1–2, 4–6 |
| (Germany) Schubert Motorsport | BMW M4 GT4 | 10 | (Germany) Marcel Lenerz | | All |
| (Germany) Schubert Motorsport | BMW M4 GT4 | 10 | (Germany) Stefan von Zabiensky | | 1–3, 5–6 |
| (Germany) Schubert Motorsport | BMW M4 GT4 | 10 | (Germany) Cristopher Dreyspring | | 4 |
| (Netherlands) Las Moras by Equipe Verschuur | McLaren 570S GT4 | 11 | (Netherlands) Gaby Uljee | | 3 |
| (Netherlands) Las Moras by Equipe Verschuur | McLaren 570S GT4 | 11 | (Netherlands) Liesette Braams | T | 3 |
| (Germany) Driverse | BMW M4 GT4 | 12 | (Netherlands) Sandra van der Sloot | | 1–3 |
| (Germany) Driverse | BMW M4 GT4 | 12 | (United Kingdom) Charlie Martin | T | 1, 3 |
| (Germany) Driverse | BMW M4 GT4 | 12 | (Netherlands) Liesette Braams | T | 2 |
| (Germany) Driverse | BMW M4 GT4 | 12 | (Germany) Alesia Kreutzpointner | | 5–6 |
| (Germany) Driverse | BMW M4 GT4 | 12 | (Germany) Jacqueline Kreutzpointner | | 5–6 |
| (Germany) Team Zakspeed | Mercedes-AMG GT4 | 13 | (France) Théo Nouet | J | All |
| (Germany) Team Zakspeed | Mercedes-AMG GT4 | 13 | (Germany) Jan Marschalkowski | J | All |
| (Germany) Team Zakspeed | Mercedes-AMG GT4 | 20 | (Czech Republic) Gabriela Jílková | | All |
| (Germany) Team Zakspeed | Mercedes-AMG GT4 | 20 | (United States) Robert Haub | | All |
| (Austria) Razoon - more than Racing | KTM X-Bow GT4 | 14 | (Austria) Leo Pichler | | All |
| (Austria) Razoon - more than Racing | KTM X-Bow GT4 | 14 | (Germany) Leon Wassertheurer | | All |
| (Germany) PROsport Racing | Aston Martin Vantage AMR GT4 | 16 | (Ukraine) Yevgen Sokolovskiy | | 5–6 |
| (Germany) PROsport Racing | Aston Martin Vantage AMR GT4 | 16 | (Germany) Yannick Fübrich | | 5–6 |
| (Germany) PROsport Racing | Aston Martin Vantage AMR GT4 | 18 | (Germany) Hugo Sasse | | 4–6 |
| (Germany) PROsport Racing | Aston Martin Vantage AMR GT4 | 18 | (Germany) Mike David Ortmann | | 4–6 |
| (Germany) Besagroup Racing Team | Mercedes-AMG GT4 | 17 | (Croatia) Franjo Kovac | T | All |
| (Germany) Besagroup Racing Team | Mercedes-AMG GT4 | 17 | (Germany) Victoria Froß | | All |
| (Germany) KÜS Team75 Bernhard | Porsche 718 Cayman GT4 Clubsport | 19 | (Germany) Alexander Tauscher | J | All |
| (Germany) KÜS Team75 Bernhard | Porsche 718 Cayman GT4 Clubsport | 19 | (Germany) Levi O'Dey | J | All |
| (Germany) Van Berghe | Porsche 718 Cayman GT4 Clubsport | 25 | (Germany) Lorenz Stegmann | | 5–6 |
| (Germany) Van Berghe | Porsche 718 Cayman GT4 Clubsport | 25 | (Germany) Robert Heger | | 5–6 |
| (Germany) Team Buchbinder Rent-a-Car | Porsche 718 Cayman GT4 Clubsport | 27 | (Germany) Stephan Grotstollen | T | 1–5 |
| (Germany) Team Buchbinder Rent-a-Car | Porsche 718 Cayman GT4 Clubsport | 27 | (Germany) Georg Braun | T | 1–5 |
| (Germany) W&S Motorsport | Porsche 718 Cayman GT4 Clubsport | 30 | (Germany) Max Kronberg | | 1–2, 4 |
| (Germany) W&S Motorsport | Porsche 718 Cayman GT4 Clubsport | 30 | (Germany) Finn Zulauf | | 1 |
| (Germany) W&S Motorsport | Porsche 718 Cayman GT4 Clubsport | 30 | (Germany) Marvin Dienst | | 2 |
| (Germany) W&S Motorsport | Porsche 718 Cayman GT4 Clubsport | 30 | (Germany) Tim Heinemann | | 4 |
| (Germany) W&S Motorsport | Porsche 718 Cayman GT4 Clubsport | 30 | (Germany) Lukas Schreier | | 5–6 |
| (Germany) W&S Motorsport | Porsche 718 Cayman GT4 Clubsport | 30 | (Germany) Fabian Vettel | | 5 |
| (Germany) W&S Motorsport | Porsche 718 Cayman GT4 Clubsport | 30 | (Denmark) Nicolaj Møller Madsen | | 6 |
| (Germany) W&S Motorsport | Mercedes-AMG GT4 | 31 | (Germany) Luca Arnold | | 5 |
| (Germany) W&S Motorsport | Mercedes-AMG GT4 | 31 | (Germany) Marvin Dienst | | 5 |
| (Germany) Seyffarth Motorsport | Audi R8 LMS GT4 | 32 | (Germany) Tim Reiter | | 1–4 |
| (Germany) Seyffarth Motorsport | Audi R8 LMS GT4 | 32 | (Poland) Robin Rogalski | | 1–4 |
| (Germany) Black Falcon Team Textar | Porsche 718 Cayman GT4 Clubsport | 33 | (Germany) Axel Sartingen | T | All |
| (Germany) Black Falcon Team Textar | Porsche 718 Cayman GT4 Clubsport | 33 | (Germany) Daniel Schwerfeld | T | All |
| (Germany) Black Falcon Team Textar | Mercedes-AMG GT4 | 68 | (United Arab Emirates) Cabell Fisher | | 5 |
| (Germany) Black Falcon Team Textar | Mercedes-AMG GT4 | 68 | (United Arab Emirates) Saif Hassan | | 5 |
| (Germany) ADAC Sachsen e.V. | Porsche 718 Cayman GT4 Clubsport | 41 | (Germany) Niki Schelle | | 4 |
| (Germany) ADAC Sachsen e.V. | Porsche 718 Cayman GT4 Clubsport | 41 | (Germany) Steve Kirsch | | 4 |
| (Germany) Dörr Motorsport | McLaren 570S GT4 | 59 | (Germany) Ben Dörr | J | All |
| (Germany) Dörr Motorsport | McLaren 570S GT4 | 59 | (Germany) Nico Hantke | J | All |
| (Germany) Dörr Motorsport | McLaren 570S GT4 | 66 | (Germany) Christer Jöns | | 1–2, 4–6 |
| (Germany) Dörr Motorsport | McLaren 570S GT4 | 66 | (United Kingdom) Fred Martin-Dye | | 1–2, 5–6 |
| (Germany) Dörr Motorsport | McLaren 570S GT4 | 66 | (Netherlands) Indy Dontje | | 4 |
| (Germany) Dörr Motorsport | Aston Martin Vantage AMR GT4 | 69 | (Germany) Phil Dörr | J | All |
| (Germany) Dörr Motorsport | Aston Martin Vantage AMR GT4 | 69 | (Germany) Andreas Wirth | | All |
| (Germany) Team Speed Monkeys | Porsche 718 Cayman GT4 Clubsport | 63 | (Germany) Jacob Riegel | | 5-6 |
| (Germany) Team Speed Monkeys | Porsche 718 Cayman GT4 Clubsport | 63 | (Germany) Dennis Richter | | 5-6 |
| (Germany) T3-Motorsport | Audi R8 LMS GT4 Evo | 77 | (Germany) Jan Philipp Springbob | | All |
| (Germany) T3-Motorsport | Audi R8 LMS GT4 Evo | 77 | (United States) John Paul Southern | | All |
| (Germany) T3-Motorsport | Audi R8 LMS GT4 Evo | 99 | (Germany) Oliver Mayer | T | 1–2, 4–6 |
| (Germany) T3-Motorsport | Audi R8 LMS GT4 Evo | 99 | (Germany) Lukas Mayer | | 1–2, 4–6 |
| (Germany) T3-Motorsport | Audi R8 LMS GT4 Evo | 99 | (Switzerland) Lucas Mauron | | 3 |
| (Germany) T3-Motorsport | Audi R8 LMS GT4 Evo | 99 | (Germany) Leon Koslowski | J | 3 |
| (Czech Republic) RTR Projects | KTM X-Bow GT4 | 89 | (Czech Republic) Matej Pavlicek | | 4 |
| (Czech Republic) RTR Projects | KTM X-Bow GT4 | 89 | (Germany) Lennart Marioneck | | 4 |
| (Germany) Ring Racing | Toyota GR Supra GT4 | 90 | (Belgium) Antoine Potty | | 5 |
| (Germany) Ring Racing | Toyota GR Supra GT4 | 90 | (Belgium) Nico Verdonck | | 5 |

| Icon | Legend |
|---|---|
| J | Junior |
| T | Trophy |

== See also ==
- 2021 GT4 European Series
- 2021 ADAC GT Masters
- 2021 French GT4 Cup
