= Jan Marschalkowski =

German racing driver (born 2002)

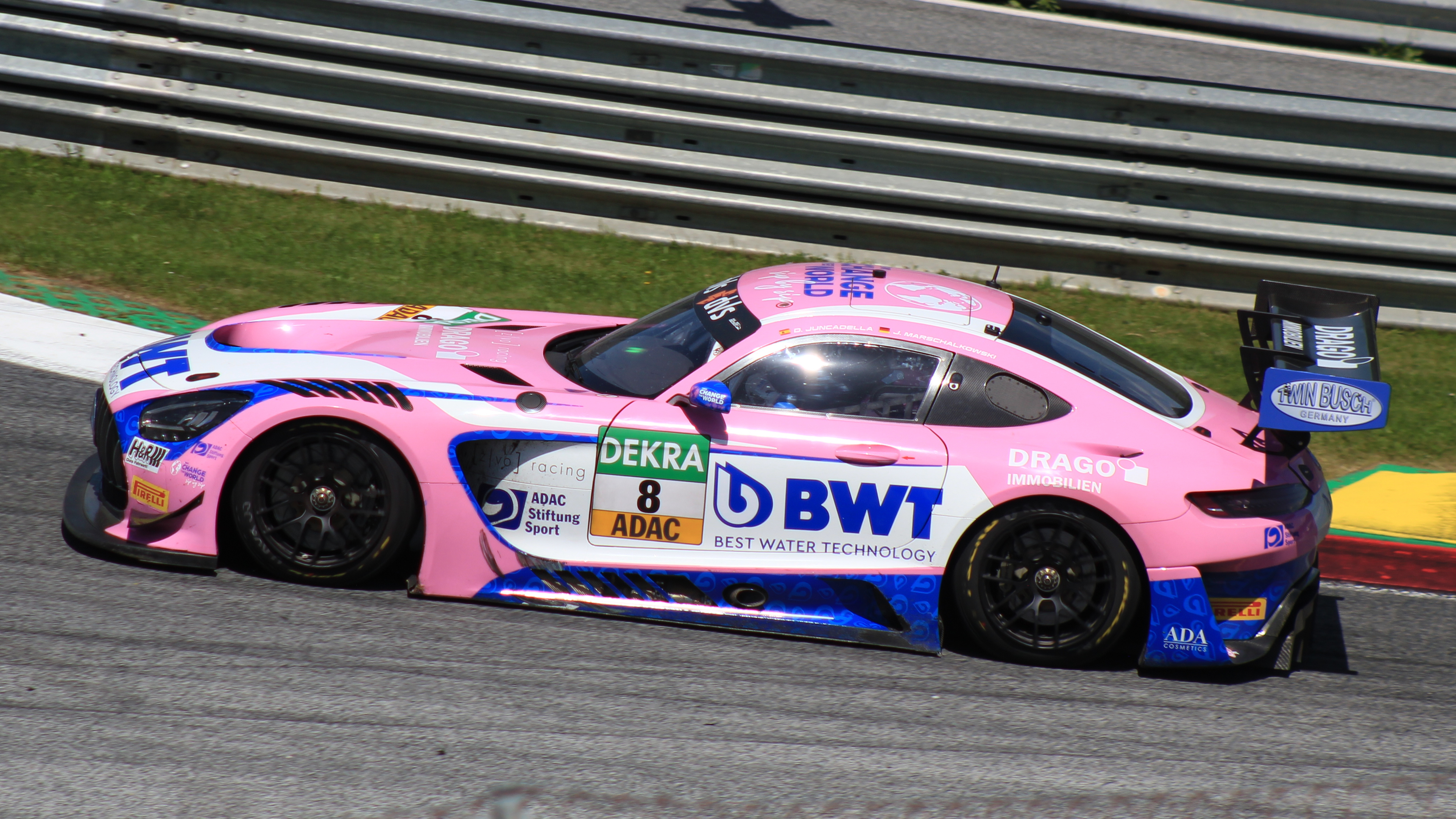
- Marschalkowski in 2022
- Nationality: (Germany) German
- Born: 3 December 2002 (age 23) Inning am Ammersee, Germany

ADAC GT Masters career
- Debut season: 2022
- Current team: Mercedes-AMG Team zvo
- Categorisation: FIA Silver
- Starts: 13 (14 entries)
- Wins: 1
- Podiums: 1
- Poles: 0
- Fastest laps: 0
- Best finish: 19th in 2022

Previous series
- 2021 2020–21: GT4 European Series; ADAC GT4 Germany

Jan Marschalkowski (born 3 December 2002) is a German racing driver. He is a race winner in the ADAC GT Masters, having taken victory at the Sachsenring during the 2022 season.

== Racing record ==
=== Racing career summary ===
| Season | Series | Team | Races | Wins | Poles | F/Laps | Podiums | Points | Position |
|---|---|---|---|---|---|---|---|---|---|
| 2020 | ADAC GT4 Germany | Team AVIA Sorg Rennsport | 12 | 1 | 0 | 0 | 3 | 122 | 5th |
| 2021 | ADAC GT4 Germany | Team Zakspeed | 12 | 2 | 0 | 1 | 7 | 178 | **2nd** |
| 2021 | GT4 European Series - Silver | Team Zakspeed | 2 | 1 | 0 | 1 | 2 | 0 | NC† |
| 2022 | ADAC GT Masters | Mercedes-AMG Team zvo | 13 | 1 | 0 | 0 | 1 | 75 | 19th |
| 2023 | Prototype Cup Germany | MRS-GT Racing | 12 | 1 | 0 | 1 | 2 | 119 | 5th |
| 2023 | Nürburgring Endurance Series - VT2-FWD | mathilda racing - Team LAVO Carwash | 2 | 0 | 0 | 0 | 1 | 0 | NC† |
| 2024 | ADAC GT4 Germany | Zakspeed ESM | 12 | 1 | 1 | 0 | 1 | 82 | 10th |

^{†} As Marschalkowski was a guest driver, he was ineligible to score points.* Season still in progress.

=== Complete ADAC GT4 Germany results ===
(key) (Races in bold indicate pole position) (Races in italics indicate fastest lap)

| Year | Team | Car | 1 | 2 | 3 | 4 | 5 | 6 | 7 | 8 | 9 | 10 | 11 | 12 | DC | Points |
|---|---|---|---|---|---|---|---|---|---|---|---|---|---|---|---|---|
| 2020 | Team AVIA Sorg Rennsport | BMW M4 GT4 | NÜR; 1; 16 | NÜR; 2; 7 | HOC; 1; 4 | HOC; 2; 10 | SAC; 1; 1 | SAC; 2; 7 | RBR; 1; 2 | RBR; 2; 7 | ZAN; 1; 2 | ZAN; 2 Ret | OSC; 1; 4 | OSC; 2; 10 | 5th | 132 |
| 2021 | Team Zakspeed | Mercedes-AMG GT4 | OSC; 1; 21 | OSC; 2 DSQ | RBR; 1; 2 | RBR; 2; 2 | ZAN; 1; 1 | **ZAN**; **2**; 1 | SAC; 1; 3 | SAC; 2; 2 | HOC; 1; 2 | HOC; 2; 8 | NÜR; 1; 9 | NÜR; 2; 19 | 2nd | 178 |

=== Complete ADAC GT Masters results ===
(key) (Races in bold indicate pole position) (Races in italics indicate fastest lap)

| Year | Team | Car | 1 | 2 | 3 | 4 | 5 | 6 | 7 | 8 | 9 | 10 | 11 | 12 | 13 | 14 | DC | Points |
|---|---|---|---|---|---|---|---|---|---|---|---|---|---|---|---|---|---|---|
| 2022 | Mercedes-AMG Team zvo | Mercedes-AMG GT3 Evo | OSC; 1; 20 | OSC; 2; 8 | RBR; 1; 16 | RBR; 2; 7 | ZAN; 1 DNS^{2} | ZAN; 2; 17 | NÜR; 1; 9 | NÜR; 2 Ret | LAU; 1; 20† | LAU; 2; 8 | SAC; 1; 4 | SAC; 2; 1 | HOC; 1; 14 | HOC; 2 Ret | 19th | 75 |

=== Complete Prototype Cup Germany results ===
(key) (Races in bold indicate pole position) (Races in italics indicate fastest lap)

| Year | Team | Car | Engine | 1 | 2 | 3 | 4 | 5 | 6 | 7 | 8 | 9 | 10 | 11 | 12 | DC | Points |
|---|---|---|---|---|---|---|---|---|---|---|---|---|---|---|---|---|---|
| 2023 | MRS-GT Racing | Ligier JS P320 | Nissan VK56DE 5.6 L V8 | HOC; 1; 11 | HOC; 2; 8 | OSC; 1; 11 | OSC; 2; 8 | ZAN; 1; 1 | ZAN; 2 Ret | NOR; 1; 7 | NOR; 2; 6 | ASS; 1; 4 | ASS; 2; 7† | NÜR; 1; 3 | NÜR; 2; 7 | 5th | 119 |

^{*} Season still in progress.
