= Piro Sports =

German auto racing team

(Germany) Piro Sports
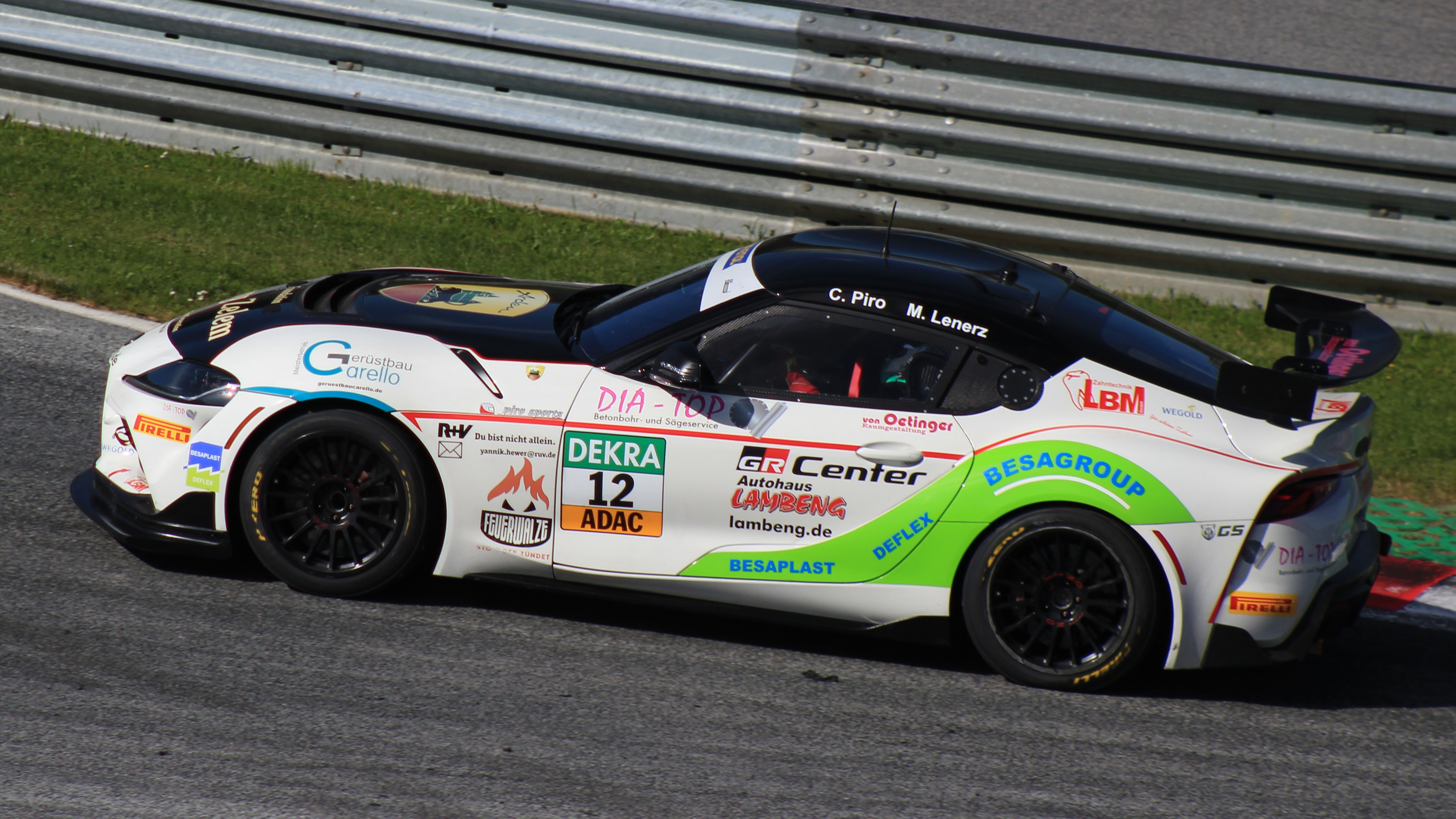
- Founded: 1998
- Team principal(s): Erwin Piro
- Current series: ADAC GT4 Germany
- Former series: ADAC Formula 4 Formula Renault 1.6 NEC Junior; TCR Europe Series
- Current drivers: (Germany) Cedric Piro (Germany) Marcel Lenerz
- Website: http://www.piro-sports.de/

Piro Sports is a German auto racing team based in Heusweiler, Germany. The team currently participates in the ADAC GT4 Germany after previously competed in single-make touring car series and junior formula racing such as ADAC Formula 4 and Formula Renault 1.6 NEC Junior.

== History ==
The team was founded by hillclimb racing driver Erwin Piro in 1998 to compete in the Ford Puma Cup. Between 2000 and 2004 the team competed in the Alfa Romeo 147 Cup and in the MINI Challenge between 2005 and 2012.

== Junior formula racing ==
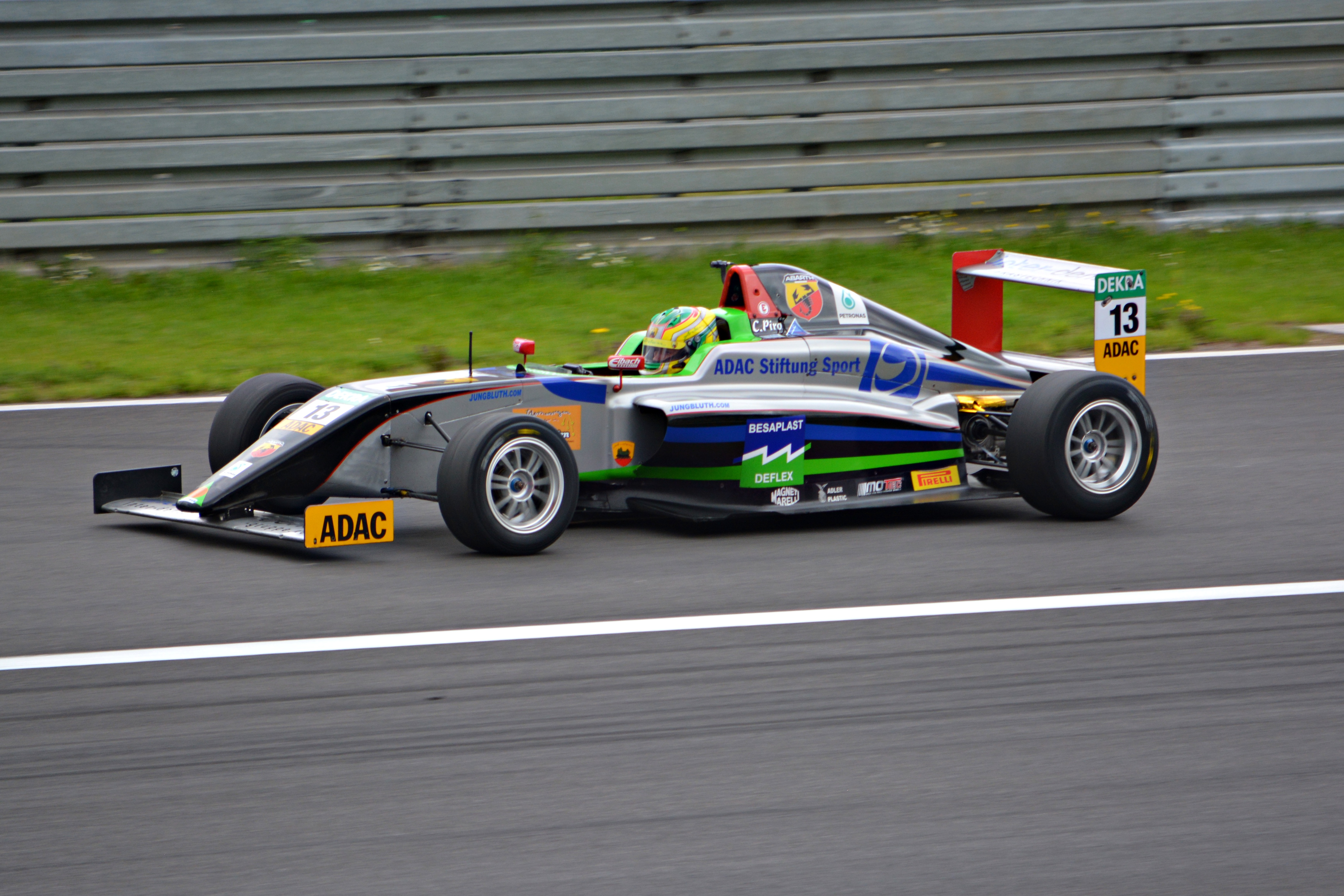
Cedric Piro competing in the 2015 ADAC Formula 4 Championship.

In 2014 the team made a switch to single seaters entering the Formula Renault 1.6 NEC Junior for Erwin Piro's son Cedric Piro and Larry ten Voorde. The drivers finished 8th (Piro) and 10th (ten Voorde). The team entered the inaugural ADAC Formula 4 season for Piro and Toni Wolf. Wolf finished the season in 22nd position while Piro finished 24th. For 2016 the team entered a single car for Piro at selected races finishing again 24th. The team returned again with Piro in 2017 and adding a second car Doureid Ghattas. Piro finished the season 20th while Ghattas finished 26th without scoring points.

== TCR Europe Series ==
Piro Sports made a return to touring cars by entering in the TCR Europe Series under the Autodis Racing by Piro Sports under Luxembourg racing license. The team entered two cars - Honda Civic Type R TCR (FK8) for Cedric Piro and Hyundai i30 N TCR for Loris Cencetti.

== Former Series results ==
=== ADAC Formula 4 ===
Year	Car	Drivers	Races	Wins	Poles	F/Laps	Podiums	Points	D.C.	T.C.
2015	Tatuus F4-T014	(Germany) Toni Wolf	23	0	0	0	0	14	22nd	N/A
2015	Tatuus F4-T014	(Germany) Cedric Piro	23	0	0	0	0	6	24th	N/A
2016	Tatuus F4-T014	(Germany) Cedric Piro	21	0	0	0	0	5	24th	10th
2017	Tatuus F4-T014	(Germany) Cedric Piro	20	0	0	0	0	19	20th	7th
2017	Tatuus F4-T014	(Germany) Doureid Ghattas	17	0	0	0	0	0	24th	7th

== Timeline ==
Former series
Ford Puma Cup	1998
Alfa Romeo 147 Cup	2000–2004
Mini Challenge Germany	2005–2012
Formula Renault 1.6 NEC Junior	2014
ADAC Formula 4	2015–2017
TCR Europe Touring Car Series	2018
ADAC GT4 Germany	2020, 2022–2023
