= 2020 ADAC GT4 Germany =

Motorsport season

The 2020 ADAC GT4 Germany season is the second season of the ADAC GT4 Germany, a sports car championship created and organised by the ADAC. The season will begin on 15 August at the Nürburgring and will end on 29 September at Oschersleben after six double-header meetings.

== Entry list ==
Team	Car	No.	Drivers	Class	Rounds
(Switzerland) Hofor Racing by Bonk Motorsport	BMW M4 GT4	2	(Germany) Michael Schrey		1
(Switzerland) Hofor Racing by Bonk Motorsport	BMW M4 GT4	2	(Italy) Gabriele Piana		1
(Switzerland) Hofor Racing by Bonk Motorsport	BMW M4 GT4	3	(Germany) Claudia Hürtgen		1
(Switzerland) Hofor Racing by Bonk Motorsport	BMW M4 GT4	3	(Germany) Sebastian von Gartzen		1
(Germany) Team AVIA Sorg Rennsport	BMW M4 GT4	4	(Germany) Jan Marschalkowski	J	1
(Germany) Team AVIA Sorg Rennsport	BMW M4 GT4	4	(Germany) Hendrik Still		1
(Germany) Racing One	Audi R8 LMS GT4 Evo	5	(Germany) Cristian Stingu		1
(Germany) Racing One	Audi R8 LMS GT4 Evo	5	(Italy) Domenico Solombrino		1
(Germany) Schütz Motorsport	Mercedes-AMG GT4	8	(Germany) Marcus Suabo	T	1
(Germany) Schütz Motorsport	Mercedes-AMG GT4	8	(Germany) Marvin Dienst		1
(Germany) Schütz Motorsport	Porsche 718 Cayman GT4 Clubsport	9	(Bulgaria) Tano Neumann	T	1
(Germany) Schütz Motorsport	Porsche 718 Cayman GT4 Clubsport	9	(Germany) Joachim Bölting	T	1
(Germany) Dupré Motorsport Engineering	Mercedes-AMG GT4	10	(Austria) Jacob Erlbacher	J	1
(Germany) Dupré Motorsport Engineering	Mercedes-AMG GT4	10	(Germany) Christoph Dupré		1
(Germany) MRS GT-Racing	BMW M4 GT4	14	(Germany) Alesia Kreuzpointner		1
(Germany) MRS GT-Racing	BMW M4 GT4	14	(Germany) Jacqueline Kreuzpointner		1
(Germany) KÜS Team75 Bernhard	Porsche 718 Cayman GT4 Clubsport	19	(Germany) Alexander Tauscher	J	1
(Germany) KÜS Team75 Bernhard	Porsche 718 Cayman GT4 Clubsport	19	(Germany) Kim Berwanger		1
(Germany) Team Allied-Racing	Porsche 718 Cayman GT4 Clubsport	21	(Germany) Joel Sturm	J	1
(Germany) Team Allied-Racing	Porsche 718 Cayman GT4 Clubsport	21	(Germany) Dennis Fetzer	J	1
(Germany) Team Allied-Racing	Porsche 718 Cayman GT4 Clubsport	22	(Germany) Jan Kasperlik	T	1
(Germany) Team Allied-Racing	Porsche 718 Cayman GT4 Clubsport	22	(Denmark) Nicolaj Møller Madsen		1
(Germany) Team Allied-Racing	Porsche 718 Cayman GT4 Clubsport	26	(Luxembourg) Christian Kosch	T	1
(Germany) Team Allied-Racing	Porsche 718 Cayman GT4 Clubsport	26	(Luxembourg) Tom Kieffer	T	1
(Germany) Team Piro Sports Caffè d′Italia	Ginetta G55 GT4	23	(Germany) Cedric Piro		1
(Germany) Team Piro Sports Caffè d′Italia	Ginetta G55 GT4	23	(Germany) Robin Falkenbach	J	1
(Austria) True Racing	KTM X-Bow GT4	24	(Austria) Reinhard Kofler		1
(Austria) True Racing	KTM X-Bow GT4	24	(Austria) Florian Janits		1
(Germany) Team Lillestoff	BMW M4 GT4	27	(Germany) Stephan Grotstollen	T	1
(Germany) Team Lillestoff	BMW M4 GT4	27	(Germany) Georg Braun	T	1
(Germany) HTP-Winward Motorsport	Mercedes-AMG GT4	48	(Switzerland) Julien Apothéloz	J	1
(Germany) HTP-Winward Motorsport	Mercedes-AMG GT4	48	(Germany) Luca-Sandro Trefz	J	1
(Germany) Dörr Motorsport	McLaren 570S GT4	59	(Latvia) Patricija Stalidzane	J	1
(Germany) Dörr Motorsport	McLaren 570S GT4	59	(Russia) Aleksey Sizov	J	1
(Germany) Dörr Motorsport	McLaren 570S GT4	69	(Germany) Phil Dörr	J	1
(Germany) Dörr Motorsport	McLaren 570S GT4	69	(United Kingdom) Fred Martin-Dye		1
(Germany) T3 Motorsport GmbH	Audi R8 LMS GT4 Evo	71	(Germany) Hugo Sasse	J	1
(Germany) T3 Motorsport GmbH	Audi R8 LMS GT4 Evo	71	(Germany) Dominique Schaak		1
(Czech Republic) RTR projects	KTM X-Bow GT4	89	(Czech Republic) Jan Krabec	T	1
(Czech Republic) RTR projects	KTM X-Bow GT4	89	(Germany) Lennart Marioneck		1

Icon	Legend
J	Junior
T	Trophy

== Race calendar and results ==
On 24 May 2020, the ADAC announced a revised 2020 calendar.

Round		Circuit	Date	Pole position	Race winner
1	R1	(Germany) Nürburgring	15 August	(Switzerland) No. 2 Hofor Racing by Bonk Motorsport	(Germany) No. 22 Team Allied-Racing
1	R1	(Germany) Nürburgring	15 August	(Germany) Michael Schrey (Italy) Gabriele Piana	(Germany) Jan Kasperlik (Denmark) Nicolaj Møller Madsen
1	R2	(Germany) Nürburgring	16 August	(Germany) No. 8 Schütz Motorsport	(Germany) No. 48 HTP-Winward Motorsport
1	R2	(Germany) Nürburgring	16 August	(Germany) Marcus Suabo (Germany) Marvin Dienst	(Switzerland) Julien Apothéloz (Germany) Luca-Sandro Trefz
2	R1	(Germany) Hockenheimring	19 September		
2	R2	(Germany) Hockenheimring	20 September		
3	R1	(Germany) Sachsenring	3 October		
3	R2	(Germany) Sachsenring	4 October		
4	R1	(Austria) Red Bull Ring	17 October		
4	R2	(Austria) Red Bull Ring	18 October		
5	R1	(Netherlands) Circuit Zandvoort	31 October		
5	R2	(Netherlands) Circuit Zandvoort	1 November		
6	R1	(Germany) Motorsport Arena Oschersleben	7 November		
6	R2	(Germany) Motorsport Arena Oschersleben	8 November		

== Championship standings ==
Scoring system

Championship points are awarded for the first fifteen positions in each race. Entries are required to complete 75% of the winning car's race distance in order to be classified and earn points. Individual drivers are required to participate for a minimum of 25 minutes in order to earn championship points in any race.

Position	**1st**	**2nd**	**3rd**	**4th**	**5th**	**6th**	**7th**	**8th**	**9th**	**10th**	**11th**	**12th**	**13th**	**14th**	**15th**
Points	25	20	16	13	11	10	9	8	7	6	5	4	3	2	1

=== Drivers' championships ===
==== Overall ====
Pos.	Driver	Team	NÜR (Germany)		HOC (Germany)	SAC (Germany)	RBR (Austria)	ZAN (Netherlands)	OSC (Germany)	Points
1	(Germany) Jan Kasperlik (Denmark) Nicolaj Møller Madsen	(Germany) Team Allied-Racing	1	3						41
2	(Germany) Michael Schrey (Italy) Gabriele Piana	(Switzerland) Hofor Racing by Bonk Motorsport	**2**	2						40
3	(Switzerland) Julien Apothéloz (Germany) Luca-Sandro Trefz	(Germany) HTP-Winward Motorsport	5	1						36
4	(Germany) Phil Dörr (United Kingdom) Fred Martin-Dye	(Germany) Dörr Motorsport	3	5						27
5	(Germany) Joel Sturm (Germany) Dennis Fetzer	(Germany) Team Allied-Racing	4	10						19
6	(Luxembourg) Tom Kieffer (Luxembourg) Christian Kosch	(Germany) Team Allied-Racing	7	8						17
7	(Germany) Alexander Tauscher (Germany) Kim Berwanger	(Germany) KÜS Team75 Bernhard	9	9						14
8	(Austria) Jacob Erlbacher (Germany) Christoph Dupré	(Germany) Dupré Motorsport Engineering	Ret	4						13
9	(Austria) Reinhard Kofler (Austria) Florian Janits	(Austria) True Racing	14	6						12
10	(Germany) Claudia Hürtgen (Switzerland) Sebastian von Gartzen	(Switzerland) Hofor Racing by Bonk Motorsport	6	16						10
11	(Germany) Jan Marschalkowski (Germany) Hendrik Still	(Germany) Team AVIA Sorg Rennsport	16	7						9
12	(Germany) Alesia Kreuzpointner (Germany) Jacqueline Kreuzpointner	(Germany) MRS GT-Racing	10	13						9
13	(Latvia) Patricija Stalidzane (Russia) Aleksey Sizov	(Germany) Dörr Motorsport	8	19						8
14	(Bulgaria) Tano Neumann (Germany) Joachim Bölting	(Germany) Schütz Motorsport	13	12						7
15	(Germany) Cristian Stingu (Italy) Domenico Solombrino	(Germany) Racing One	11	18						5
15	(Germany) Georg Braun (Germany) Stephan Grotstollen	(Germany) Team Lillestoff	Ret	11						5
16	(Germany) Hugo Sasse (Germany) Dominique Schaak	(Germany) T3 Motorsport GmbH	12	17						4
17	(Germany) Marcus Suabo (Germany) Marvin Dienst	(Germany) Schütz Motorsport	Ret	**14**						2
18	(Czech Republic) Jan Krabec (Germany) Lennart Marioneck	(Czech Republic) RTR projects	Ret	15						1
18	(Germany) Cedric Piro (Germany) Robin Falkenbach	(Germany) Team Piro Sports Caffè d Italia	15	Ret						1
Pos.	Driver	Team	NÜR (Germany)		HOC (Germany)	SAC (Germany)	RBR (Austria)	ZAN (Netherlands)	OSC (Germany)	Points

Key
Colour	Result
Gold	Race winner
Silver	2nd place
Bronze	3rd place
Green	Points finish
Blue	Non-points finish
Blue	Non-classified finish (NC)
Purple	Did not finish (Ret)
Black	Disqualified (DSQ)
Black	Excluded (EX)
White	Did not start (DNS)
White	Race cancelled (C)
White	Withdrew (WD)
Blank	Did not participate

**Bold** – Pole
Italics – Fastest Lap

=== Teams' championship ===
Pos.	Team	Manufacturer	NÜR (Germany)		HOC (Germany)	SAC (Germany)	RBR (Austria)	ZAN (Netherlands)	OSC (Germany)	Points
1	(Germany) Team Allied-Racing	Porsche	1	3						41
2	(Switzerland) Hofor Racing by Bonk Motorsport	BMW	2	2						40
3	(Germany) HTP-Winward Motorsport	Mercedes-AMG	4	1						38
4	(Germany) Dörr Motorsport	McLaren	3	5						27
5	(Germany) KÜS Team75 Bernhard	Porsche	5	8						19
6	(Austria) True Racing	KTM	10	6						16
7	(Germany) MRS GT-Racing	BMW	6	11						15
8	(Germany) Dupré Motorsport Engineering	Mercedes-AMG	Ret	4						13
9	(Germany) Team AVIA Sorg Rennsport	BMW	12	7						13
10	(Germany) Schütz Motorsport	Porsche	9	10						13
11	(Germany) Racing One	Audi	7	14						11
12	(Germany) T3 Motorsport GmbH	Audi	8	13						11
13	(Germany) Team Lillestoff	BMW	Ret	9						7
14	(Germany) Team Piro Sports Caffè d Italia	Ginetta	11	Ret						5
15	(Czech Republic) RTR projects	KTM	Ret	12						4
Pos.	Team	Manufacturer	NÜR (Germany)		HOC (Germany)	SAC (Germany)	RBR (Austria)	ZAN (Netherlands)	OSC (Germany)	Points

== See also ==
- 2020 GT4 European Series
- 2020 ADAC GT Masters
- 2020 French GT4 Cup
