= Gabriele Piana =

Italian racing driver (born 1986)

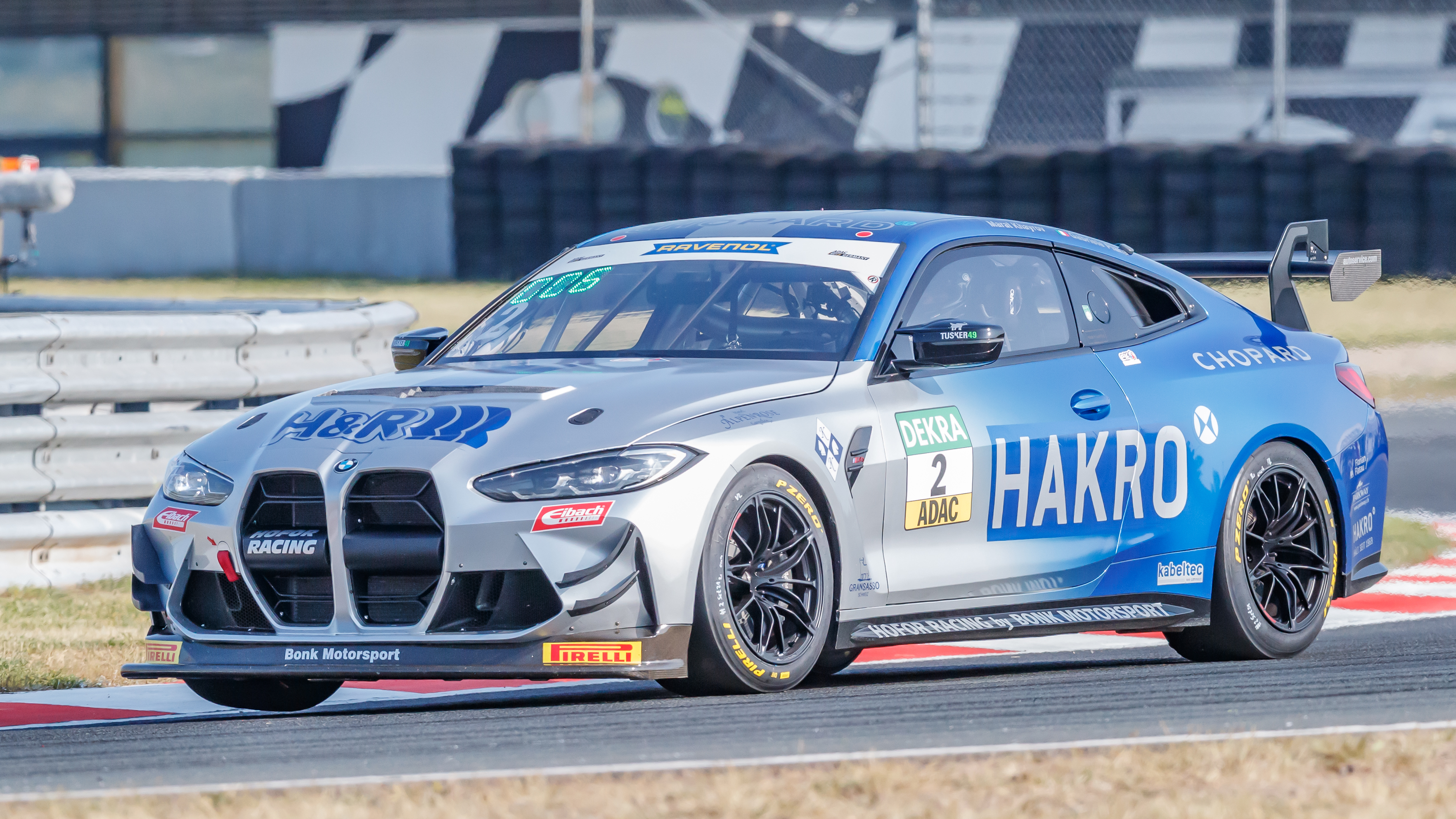
- Piana competing in ADAC GT4 Germany in 2023
- Nationality: (Italy) Italian
- Born: 21 February 1986 (age 40) Biella, Italy
- Categorisation: FIA Silver

Championship titles
- 2023 2021: GT4 European Series; ADAC GT4 Germany

Gabriele Piana (born 23 August 1986) is an Italian racing driver, known for his success in the GT4 category. He is an ADAC GT4 Germany and GT4 European Series champion, having won the titles for Hofor Racing by Bonk Motorsport in 2021 and 2023 respectively. Since 2017, Piana has also competed in GT World Challenge Europe for Mercedes-AMG teams. He has triumphed at the Nürburgring 24 Hours, winning his class six times, and the Dubai 24 Hour, winning overall in 2018.

== Racing record ==
=== Racing career summary ===
Season	Series	Team	Races	Wins	Poles	F/Laps	Podiums	Points	Position
2016	VLN Series - V4	Adrenalin Motorsport	10	4	6	7	7	?	**2nd**
2016	VLN Series - BMW M235i Cup	Adrenalin Motorsport	6	0	2	4	0	32	16th
2016	24 Hours of Nürburgring - Qualifying Race - Cup5	Adrenalin Motorsport	1	1	0	0	1	N/A	**1st**
2016	24 Hours of Nürburgring - V4	Pixum Team Adrenalin Motorsport	1	1	0	1	1	N/A	**1st**
2017	Porsche Carrera Cup Germany	RN Vision Team Black Falcon	14	0	0	0	0	105	9th
2017	GT4 European Series Northern Cup - Pro-Am	RN Vision STS	8	4	0	2	5	138	4th
2017	Blancpain GT Series Endurance Cup - Pro-Am	Black Falcon	2	0	0	0	0	7	34th
2017	VLN Series - Cup3	Mühlner Motorsport	2	0	1	1	2	0	NC
2017	VLN Series - SP10	Black Falcon TMD Friction	5	1	2	4	4	0	NC
2017	24 Hours of Nürburgring - Qualifying Race - SP10	Black Falcon TMD Friction	1	0	0	0	0	N/A	NC
2017	24 Hours of Nürburgring - SP10	Black Falcon TMD Friction	1	1	?	?	1	N/A	**1st**
2017	24H Series - SP3	Black Falcon TMD Friction	1	0	0	0	0	0	16th
2017	24H Series - SP2	Mercedes-AMG Testteam Black Falcon	1	0	0	0	0	0	NC
2017	IMSA Continental Challenge - GT4	Muehlner Motorsports America	1	0	0	0	0	22	30th
2018	GT4 European Series - Silver	RN Vision STS	12	1	1	2	4	98	7th
2018	Blancpain GT Series Endurance Cup	Black Falcon	5	0	0	0	0	1	46th
2018	Blancpain GT Series Endurance Cup - Silver	Black Falcon	5	1	0	0	4	97	**2nd**
2018	VLN Series - SP9	Black Falcon	1	1	0	0	1	9.38	34th
2018	24 Hours of Nürburgring - Qualifying Race - SP9	Black Falcon	1	0	0	0	0	N/A	9th
2018	24 Hours of Nürburgring - SP9	Black Falcon	1	0	0	0	0	N/A	4th
2018	24H GT Series - Continents' - A6	Black Falcon	1	1	0	0	1	0	NC
2018	24H GT Series - SPX	Leipert Motorsport	1	0	0	0	1	0	NC
2018	Pirelli World Challenge - GTS Sprint	Muehlner Motorsports America	2	0	1	0	2	47	17th
2018	Pirelli World Challenge - GTS Pro-Am	Muehlner Motorsports America	4	0	0	0	0	28	30th
2019	GT4 European Series - Pro-Am	RN Vision STS	11	5	2	3	8	199	**2nd**
2019	ADAC GT4 Germany	RN Vision STS	12	2	1	0	4	143	**2nd**
2019	Blancpain GT Series Endurance Cup	Black Falcon	4	0	0	0	0	10	23rd
2019	Blancpain GT Series Endurance Cup - Silver	Black Falcon	4	0	0	0	3	69	**3rd**
2019	Blancpain GT World Challenge Asia - GT3	Solite Indigo Racing	2	0	0	0	1	28	20th
2019	24H GT Series - Continents' - GT4	ERC Sport	1	0	0	0	0	0	NC
2019	VLN Series - SP9	Black Falcon	0	0	0	0	0	0	NC
2019	VLN Series - SP8T	Black Falcon	4	3	0	0	3	29.11	**2nd**
2019	VLN Series - V6	Black Falcon Team TMD Textar	1	1	0	0	1	8.33	21st
2019	VLN Series - Cup3	Mühlner Motorsport	1	0	0	0	1	7.22	30th
2019	24 Hours of Nürburgring - Qualifying Race - SP9	Mercedes-AMG Team Black Falcon	1	0	0	0	0	N/A	5th
2019	24 Hours of Nürburgring - SP9	Mercedes-AMG Team Black Falcon	1	0	0	0	0	N/A	DNF
2019	Italian GT Sprint Championship - GT3 Pro-Am	MRS GT Racing	2	1	1	2	2	?	?
2020	ADAC GT4 Germany	Hofor Racing by Bonk Motorsport	12	1	2	1	5	173	**2nd**
2020	GT4 European Series - Silver	RN Vision STS Racing Team	8	2	2	2	4	123	6th
2020	GT World Challenge Europe Endurance Cup	Haupt Racing Team	1	0	0	0	0	0	NC
2020	GT World Challenge Europe Endurance Cup - Silver	Haupt Racing Team	1	1	0	0	1	46	7th
2020	Nürburgring Langstrecken-Serie - SP9	Mercedes-AMG Team HRT	2	0	0	0	0	12.46	44th
2020	Nürburgring Langstrecken-Serie - SP8T	Black Falcon Team TEXTAR	1	1	0	0	1	8.75	12th
2020	Nürburgring Langstrecken-Serie - SP10	Hofor Racing by Bonk Motorsport	5	2	0	0	4	32.07	4th
2020	24H GT Series - GT4	Hofor Racing by Bonk Motorsport	1	0	0	1	0	14	12th
2021	ADAC GT4 Germany	Hofor Racing by Bonk Motorsport	12	5	1	4	6	189	**1st**
2021	Nürburgring Langstrecken-Serie - SP10	Hofor Racing by Bonk Motorsport	2	0	0	0	2	0	NC
2021	Nürburgring Langstrecken-Serie - M240i	Hofor Racing by Bonk Motorsport	2	2	2	0	2	0	NC
2021	DTM Trophy	Hofor Racing by Bonk Motorsport	2	0	0	0	0	4	21st
2021	GT World Challenge Europe Endurance Cup	Haupt Racing Team	1	0	0	0	0	0	NC
2021	GT World Challenge Europe Endurance Cup - Silver	Haupt Racing Team	1	0	0	0	0	6	31st
2021	DMV NES 500 - National Endurance Series - NES 9	RP Team Racing	4	1	2	1	4	0	NC
2021	Nürburgring Langstrecken-Serie - SP8T	Black Falcon Team TEXTAR	4	4	4	0	4	0	NC
2021	24 Hours of Nürburgring - SP8T	Black Falcon Team Textar	1	1	1	0	1	N/A	**1st**
2021	24 Hours of Nürburgring - SP10	Hofor Racing by Bonk Motorsport	1	0	0	0	1	N/A	**2nd**
2022	ADAC GT4 Germany	Hofor Racing by Bonk Motorsport	12	2	1	1	3	121	4th
2022	GT4 European Series - Silver	Hofor Racing by Bonk Motorsport	4	0	0	0	1	37	11th
2022	GT World Challenge Europe Endurance Cup	Haupt Racing Team	1	0	0	0	0	0	NC
2022	GT World Challenge Europe Endurance Cup - Gold	Haupt Racing Team	1	0	0	0	0	19	17th
2022	Porsche Endurance Trophy Nürburgring - CUP2	Black Falcon	4	?	?	?	?	?	?
2022	24 Hours of Nürburgring - SP9 Pro-Am	Mercedes-AMG Team Bilstein by HRT	1	1	?	?	1	N/A	**1st**
2022	24 Hours of Nürburgring - Cup2	Black Falcon	1	0	0	0	1	N/A	**2nd**
2023	GT4 European Series - Silver	Hofor Racing by Bonk Motorsport	12	3	3	2	7	171	**1st**
2023	ADAC GT4 Germany	Hofor Racing by Bonk Motorsport	12	0	1	5	1	100	6th
2023	Porsche Endurance Trophy Nürburgring - CUP2	Black Falcon Team Textar	4	0	0	0	0	57	19th
2023	Porsche Endurance Trophy Nürburgring - CUP2	Black Falcon Team Identica	1	1	0	1	1	57	19th
2023	Porsche Endurance Trophy Nürburgring - CUP3	Black Falcon Team Textar	1	0	1	0	0	8	34th
2023	24 Hours of Nürburgring - Cup2	Black Falcon Team Identica	0	0	0	0	0	N/A	DNS
2024	GT4 European Series - Silver	Borusan Otomotiv Motorsport	12	1	0	1	3	89	6th
2024	ADAC GT4 Germany	Hofor Racing by Bonk Motorsport	12	5	3	3	5	188	**2nd**
2024	Porsche Endurance Trophy Nürburgring - CUP2	Black Falcon	4	1	2	0	1	50*	12th*
2024	24 Hours of Nürburgring - Cup2	Black Falcon	1	1	0	0	1	N/A	**1st**
2024	992 Endurance Cup	Black Falcon	1	0	0	0	0	N/A	13th
2024-25	Asian Le Mans Series - GT	Winward Racing	6	1	1	0	2	65	**3rd**
2025	Middle East Trophy - GT3	Winward Racing	2	0	0	0	0	26	4th
2025	GT World Challenge Europe Endurance Cup	Winward Racing	5	0	0	0	0	0	NC
2025	GT World Challenge Europe Sprint Cup	Winward Racing	4	0	0	0	0	0	NC
2025	Gulf 12 Hours	Winward Racing	1	0	0	0	0	N/A	5th
2025	GT4 European Series - Silver	Borusan Otomotiv Motorsport	12	1	0	0	6	146	**3rd**
2025	Nürburgring Langstrecken-Serie - SP9	Black Falcon Team EAE							
2025	24 Hours of Nürburgring - SP9 Pro-Am	Black Falcon Team EAE	1	0	0	0	0	N/A	7th
2025	ADAC GT4 Germany	FK Performance Motorsport	12	2	0	0	4	159	**3rd**
2025	992 Endurance Cup	48 LOSCH Motorsport by BLACK FALCON	1	1	0	0	1	N/A	**1st**
2025-26	24H Series Middle East - GT3	Winward Racing							
2025-26	Asian Le Mans Series - GT	Team WRT	4	0	0	0	1	0	NC†
2026	Nürburgring Langstrecken-Serie - SP9	Black Falcon Team EAE							
2026	24 Hours of Nürburgring - SP9 Am	Black Falcon Team EAE	1	1	1	0	1	N/A	**1st**
2026	GT4 European Series - Silver	Borusan Otomotiv Motorsport							
2026	GT World Challenge Europe Endurance Cup	Winward Racing							
2026	ADAC GT4 Germany	FK Performance Motorsport	12	3	2	4	8	200	**2nd**
2026	GT Cup Open Europe	Volcano Motorsport							
2026-27	Asian Le Mans Series - GT3	Winward Racing							

* Season still in progress.

=== Complete GT4 European Series results ===
(key) (Races in bold indicate pole position) (Races in italics indicate fastest lap)

Year	Team	Car	Class	1	2	3	4	5	6	7	8	9	10	11	12	Pos	Points
2017	RN Vision STS	Porsche Cayman GT4 Clubsport MR	Silver	MIS; 1; 5	MIS; 2; 14	BRH; 1	BRH; 2	RBR; 1 Ret	**RBR**; **2**; 11	SVK; 1; 3	**SVK**; **2**; 2	ZAN; 1; 8	ZAN; 2; 7	NÜR; 1	NÜR; 2	4th	138
2018	RN Vision STS	BMW M4 GT4	Silver	ZOL; 1; 19	ZOL; 2; 21	BRH; 1; 32	BRH; 2; 10	MIS; 1; 1	MIS; 2; 2	SPA; 1; 8	SPA; 2; 10	**HUN**; **1**; 2	HUN; 2; 2	NÜR; 1; 10	NÜR; 2; 9	7th	98
2019	RN Vision STS	BMW M4 GT4	Pro-Am	IMO; 1; 6	IMO; 2; 6	BRH; 1; 8	BRH; 2 Ret	LEC; 1; 10	LEC; 2; 17	**MIS**; **1**; 2	MIS; 2 DNS	ZAN; 1; 7	ZAN; 2; 11	**NÜR**; **1**; 6	**NÜR**; **2**; 8	2nd	199
2020	RN Vision STS Racing Team	BMW M4 GT4	Silver	**IMO**; **1**; 1	**IMO**; **2**; 1	MIS; 1; 2	MIS; 2; 3	NÜR; 1; 8	NÜR; 2; 7	ZAN; 1; 7	ZAN; 2; 7	SPA; 1	SPA; 2	LEC; 1	LEC; 2	6th	123
2022	Hofor Racing by Bonk Motorsport	BMW M4 GT4	Silver	IMO; 1	IMO; 2	LEC; 1	LEC; 2	MIS; 1	MIS; 2	SPA; 1; 6	SPA; 2; 4	HOC; 1; 3	HOC; 2 Ret	CAT; 1	CAT; 2	11th	37
2023	Hofor Racing by Bonk Motorsport	BMW M4 GT4 Gen II	Silver	MNZ; 1; 3	**MNZ**; **2**; 1	LEC; 1; 12	**LEC**; **2**; 2	SPA; 1; 2	SPA; 2; 7	MIS; 1; 1	MIS; 2; 2	HOC; 1; 9	HOC; 2; 13	CAT; 1; 7	**CAT**; **2**; 1	1st	170
2024	Borusan Otomotiv Motorsport	BMW M4 GT4 Gen II	Silver	LEC; 1; 6	LEC; 2; 6	MIS; 1; 38†	MIS; 2; 23	SPA; 1 Ret	SPA; 2; 3	HOC; 1; 1	HOC; 2; 3	MNZ; 1; 7	MNZ; 2; 4	JED; 1 Ret	JED; 2 Ret	6th	89
2025	Borusan Otomotiv Motorsport	BMW M4 GT4 Evo (G82)	Silver	LEC; 1; 10	LEC; 2; 4	ZAN; 1; 9	ZAN; 2; 4	SPA; 1; 4	SPA; 2; 1	MIS; 1; 3	MIS; 2; 28	NÜR; 1; 3	NÜR; 2; 2	CAT; 1; 2	CAT; 2; 3	3rd	146

=== Complete GT World Challenge Europe results ===
==== GT World Challenge Europe Endurance Cup ====
(key) (Races in bold indicate pole position) (Races in italics indicate fastest lap)

Year	Team	Car	Class	1	2	3	4	5	6	7	Pos.	Points
2017	Black Falcon	Mercedes-AMG GT3	Pro	MNZ	SIL	LEC; Ret					NC	0
2017	Black Falcon	Mercedes-AMG GT3	Pro-Am				SPA; 6H; 19	SPA; 12H; 45	SPA; 24H; Ret	CAT	37th	7
2018	Black Falcon	Mercedes-AMG GT3	Silver	MNZ; 10	SIL; 18	LEC; 15	SPA; 6H; 33	SPA; 12H; 29	SPA; 24H; 23	CAT; 44	2nd	97
2019	Black Falcon	Mercedes-AMG GT3	Silver	MNZ; 5	SIL; 20	LEC; 14	SPA; 6H; 21	SPA; 12H; 40	SPA; 24H; 24	CAT	3rd	69
2020	Haupt Racing Team	Mercedes-AMG GT3 Evo	Silver	IMO	NÜR	SPA; 6H; 20	SPA; 12H; 20	SPA; 24H; 18	LEC		7th	46
2021	Haupt Racing Team	Mercedes-AMG GT3 Evo	Silver	MNZ	LEC; 23	SPA; 6H	SPA; 12H	SPA; 24H	NÜR	CAT	31st	6
2022	Haupt Racing Team	Mercedes-AMG GT3 Evo	Gold	IMO	LEC	SPA; 6H; 19	SPA; 12H; 31†	SPA; 24H; Ret	HOC	CAT	17th	19
2025	Winward Racing	Mercedes-AMG GT3 Evo	Bronze	LEC; 33	MNZ; 14	SPA; 6H; 38	SPA; 12H; 26	SPA; 24H; 17	NÜR; 41	CAT; Ret	4th	61
2026	Winward Racing	Mercedes-AMG GT3 Evo	Bronze	LEC; 22	**MNZ**; 35†	SPA; 6H; 40	SPA; 12H; 31	SPA; 24H; 21	NÜR; 25	ALG	4th*	58*

==== GT World Challenge Europe Sprint Cup ====
(key) (Races in bold indicate pole position) (Races in italics indicate fastest lap)

Year	Team	Car	Class	1	2	3	4	5	6	7	8	Pos.	Points
2025	Winward Racing	Mercedes-AMG GT3 Evo	Bronze	ZAN; 1 Ret	ZAN; 2; 30	MIS; 1; 27	MIS; 2; 31	MAG; 1	MAG; 2	VAL; 1	VAL; 2	10th	24.5

=== Complete Asian Le Mans Series results ===
(key) (Races in bold indicate pole position) (Races in italics indicate fastest lap)

Year	Team	Class	Car	1	2	3	4	5	6	Pos.	Points
2024–25	Winward Racing	GT	Mercedes-AMG GT3 Evo	SEP; 1; 5	SEP; 2; 1	DUB; 1 Ret	DUB; 2; 2	**ABU**; **1** Ret	ABU; 2; 10	3rd	65
2025–26	Team WRT	GT	BMW M4 GT3 Evo	SEP; 1	SEP; 2	DUB; 1; 6	DUB; 2 Ret	ABU; 1; 2	ABU; 2; 7	NC‡	0‡
2026–27	Winward Racing	GT	Mercedes-AMG GT3 Evo	LEC; 1; 8	LEC; 2; 4	JER; 1	JER; 2	ALG; 1	ALG; 2	5th*	16*
