= ADAC GT4 Germany =

Auto racing series largely held in Germany

- Category: Grand Touring racing
- Region: Europe
- Inaugural season: 2019
- Constructors: Various
- Tyre suppliers: Pirelli
- Drivers' champion: (Germany) Jay Mo Härtling (Germany) Enrico Förderer
- Teams' champion: (Germany) AVIA W&S Motorsport

The ADAC GT4 Germany is a grand tourer-based auto racing series that is largely held in Germany. The races are held as part of the ADAC GT Masters, and GT4 vehicles are used. The championship took place for the first time in 2019.

== History ==
On 27 July 2019, in a press conference of the 24 Hours of Spa, it was announced that ADAC had acquired the rights to the GT4 class for Germany and that its existing motorsport program (consisting of: ADAC GT Masters, TCR Germany and ADAC Formula 4) wants to expand. The new racing series is based on the ADAC GT Masters and is intended as a springboard for young talents. The foundation of the series was initiated by Hermann Tomczyk (ADAC Sport President), Lars Soutschka (ADAC Managing Director) and Stéphane Ratel (founder and CEO of the SRO Motorsports Group). ADAC GT4 Germany was integrated into the ADAC motorsport program in 2019.

== Race format ==
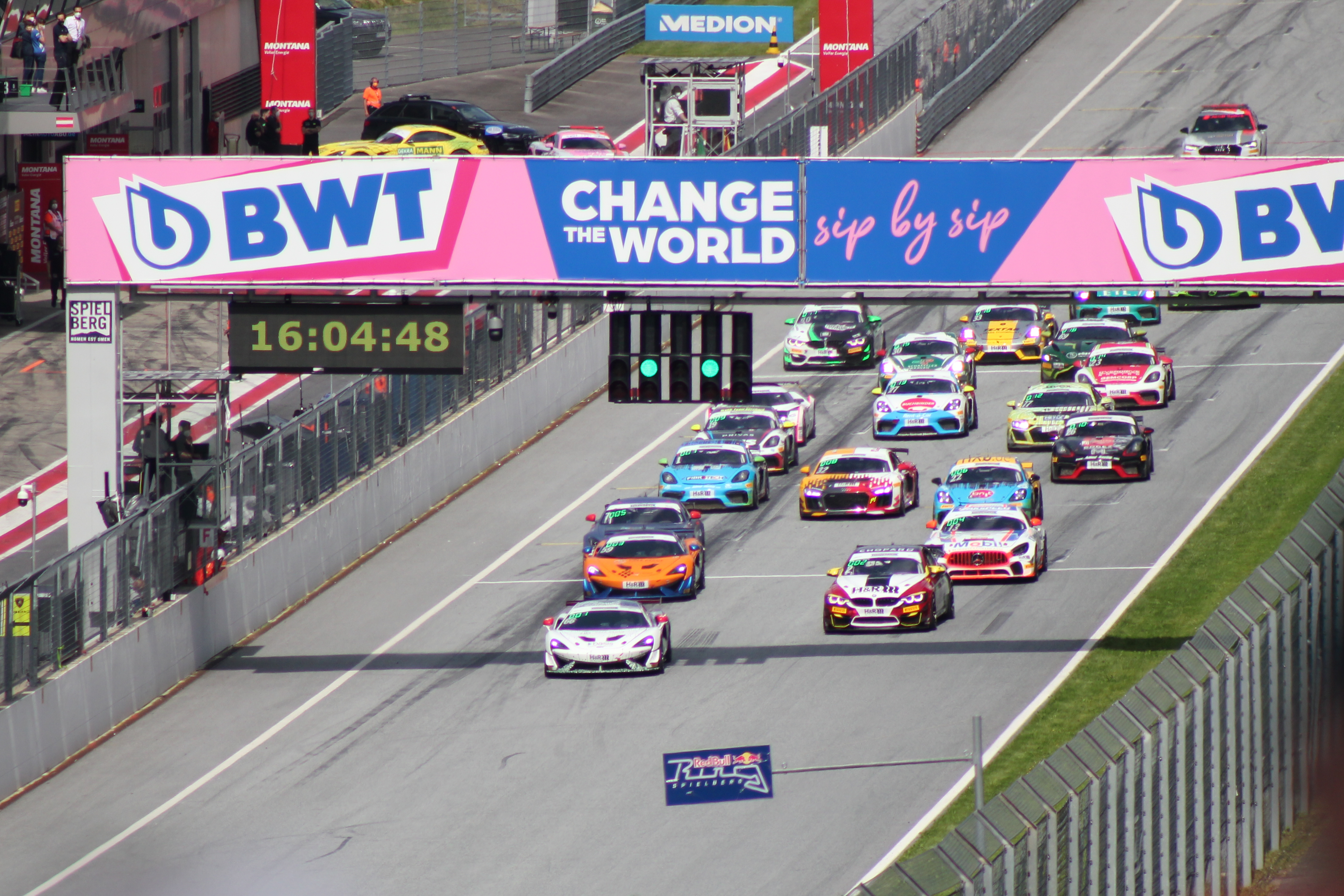
Start of the 2021 season in Spielberg

The round begins with 2 qualifying sessions, each 20 minutes. In Q1 the starting place for the first race is determined, in Q2 the starting place for the second race. There are 2 races per race weekend; the races last one hour like in the ADAC GT Masters. A driver change must be made between the 25th and 35th minute of the race. There is a minimum downtime that depends on the track and BOP; during a pit stop, a maximum of 2 people may work on the vehicle.

== Champions ==
Season	Overall Champion	Team Champion	Trophy Champion (2019–2024) Pro-Am champion (2025–)	Junior Champion	Rookie Champion
2019	(Austria) Eike Angermayr (Norway) Mads Siljehaug	(Switzerland) Hofor Racing by Bonk Motorsport	(Germany) Oliver Mayer	(Germany) Marius Zug	—N/a
2020	(Denmark) Nicolaj Møller Madsen (Germany) Jan Kasperlik	(Germany) Team Allied-Racing	(Germany) Stephan Grotstollen (Germany) Georg Braun	(Germany) Jan Marschalkowski	—N/a
2021	(Germany) Michael Schrey (Italy) Gabriele Piana	(Germany) Team Zakspeed	(Luxembourg) Tom Kieffer (Luxembourg) Christian Kosch	(France) Théo Nouet	—N/a
2022	(Germany) Hugo Sasse (Germany) Mike David Ortmann	(Germany) Dörr Motorsport	(Luxembourg) Tom Kieffer (Luxembourg) Christian Kosch	(Germany) Hugo Sasse	—N/a
2023	(Germany) Hugo Sasse (Germany) Mike David Ortmann	(Germany) AVIA W&S Motorsport	(Kyrgyzstan) Marat Khayrov	(Germany) Simon Connor Primm	—N/a
2024	(Czech Republic) Josef Knopp (Germany) Finn Zulauf	(Germany) AVIA W&S Motorsport	(Germany) Max Kronberg	(Czech Republic) Josef Knopp (Germany) Finn Zulauf	—N/a
2025	(Germany) Jay Mo Härtling (Germany) Enrico Förderer	(Germany) AVIA W&S Motorsport	(Germany) Laurenz Rühl (Canada) Damon Surzyshyn	(Germany) Jay Mo Härtling (Germany) Enrico Förderer	(Germany) Cedric Fuchs

== Circuits ==
- (Germany) Motorsport Arena Oschersleben (2019–present)
- (Austria) Red Bull Ring (2019–2022, 2024–present)
- (Netherlands) Circuit Zandvoort (2019, 2021–2023)
- (Germany) Nürburgring (2019–present)
- (Germany) Hockenheimring (2019–present)
- (Germany) Sachsenring (2019–2023, 2025–present)
- (Germany) Lausitzring (2020, 2023–2024)
- (Germany) Norisring (2024–present)
