= Nicolaj Møller Madsen =

Danish racing driver (born 1993)

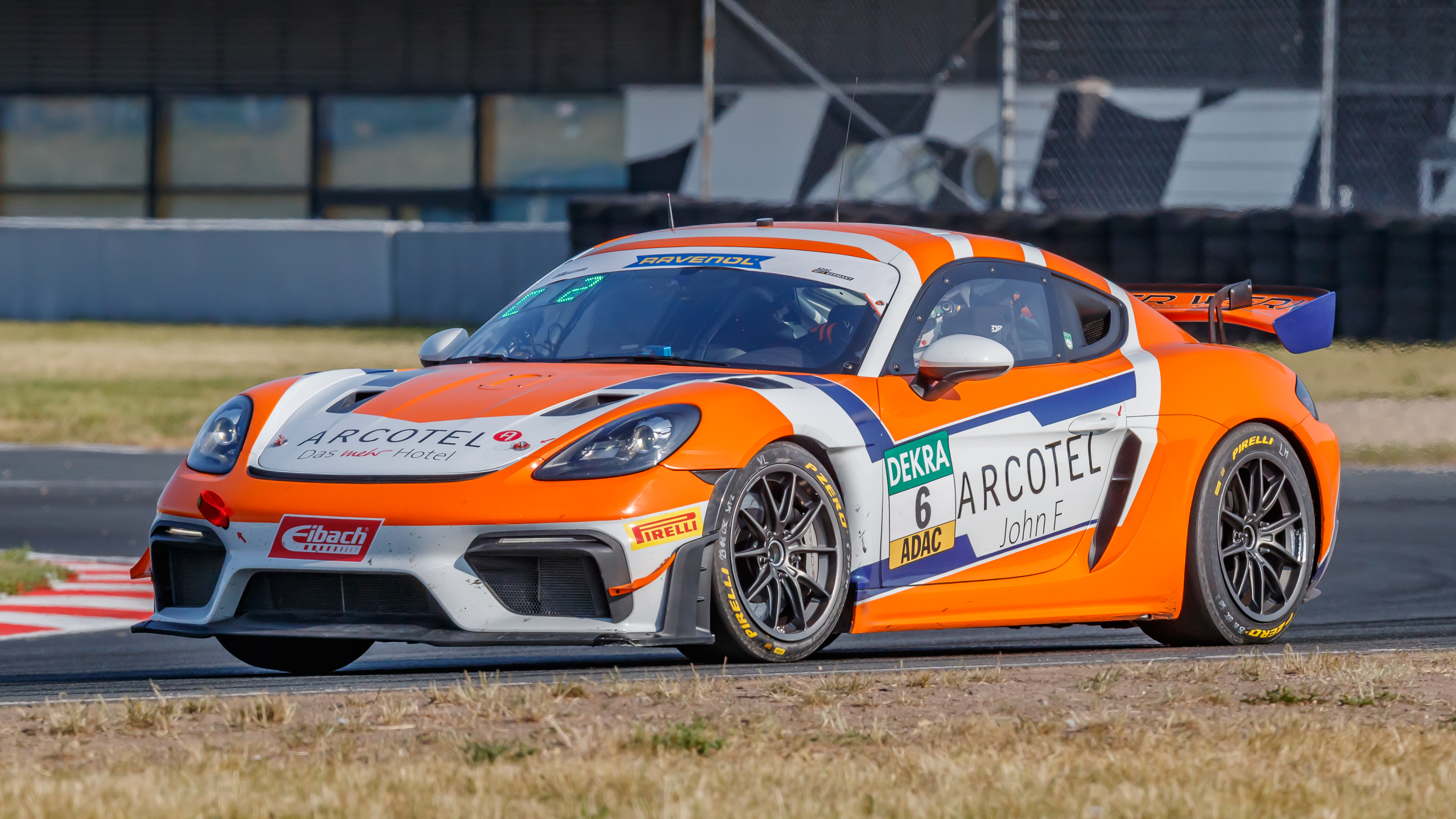
- Møller Madsen in 2023
- Nationality: (Denmark) Danish
- Born: 10 March 1993 (age 33) Søndersø, Denmark
- Categorisation: FIA Silver

Previous series
- 2020 2018 2017: ADAC GT4 Germany; GT4 European Series – Silver; Bathurst 12 Hour – C

Nicolaj Møller Madsen (born 10 March 1993 in Søndersø) is a Danish racing driver who last raced in GT4 European Series for Wimmer Werk Motorsport.

Born in Søndersø, Møller Madsen began racing karts in the early 2000s, in which he won two Danish Karting titles, before winning the SKUSA SuperNationals in 2009 and the Karting European Championship in 2010. Making his car-racing debut three years later, Møller Madsen was a mainstay in GT4 competitions, winning titles in the GT4 European Series and ADAC GT4 Germany in 2018 and 2020, respectively.

== Career ==
Møller Madsen began karting in 2005. Mainly racing in Scandinavia in his first three years, Møller Madsen won the DASU Youth Cup in 2005 and 2008, along with winning the Peugeot Super Kart race in 2007 and the Danish Karting Championship in 2007 and 2008.

Having made his debut in International races in 2006, Møller Madsen won the Deutsche Kart-Meisterschaft, Bridgestone Cup Europe and SKUSA SuperNationals in his first full year in International races, all in the KF2 class with Energy Corse. Møller Madsen stayed with Energy Corse for the following two seasons, with whom he won the Deutsche Kart-Meisterschaft and Karting European Championship titles in 2010, before taking his second Bridgestone Cup Europe title the following year.

After two more years in karting, Møller Madsen began his racing career in 2013, racing in both the Volkswagen Scirocco R-Cup and the Yokohama SuperCup. The Dane spent two years in the former, in which he scored two podiums in his sophomore year and ended the year fifth in points. In 2015, Møller Madsen transitioned to the Audi Sport TT Cup. In his only season in the series, Møller Madsen took a lone win at the Norisring and was runner-up in the season's standings, 25 points behind Jan Kisiel.

The following year, Møller Madsen joined Phoenix Racing for a dual program in the Blancpain GT Sprint Series Cup and the GT4 European Series from Pau onwards. In the former, Møller Madsen opened up the season with a class win at Misano, before taking further class wins at the Hungaroring and the season-ending round at Barcelona as he capped off the year runner-up in the Silver Cup. In the latter, Møller Madsen scored a lone win at Pau, which helped him to finish third in the Silver Cup standings at season's end.

After taking a class win at the Bathurst 12 Hour in early 2017, Møller Madsen returned to the newly-rebranded GT4 European Series Northern Cup for the rest of the year, joining PROsport Performance to race in the Pro-Am class alongside Jörg Viebahn. After taking an overall win in the season-opening round at Misano, Møller Madsen was left on the sidelines at Brands Hatch after crashing in qualifying and severely damaging the car, which caused the team to withdraw from that weekend. After missing the following two rounds due to brake issues with the car and losing his driver's licence after speeding in his native Denmark, Møller Madsen returned to the series for the season-finale at the Nürburgring, where he finished no higher than 20th across the two races.

In 2018, Møller Madsen joined Phoenix Racing and partnered up with Milan Dontje for his first full season in the GT4 European Series. The duo won the season-opening race at Zolder, before taking more wins at Brands Hatch and Spa, on his way to the title at season's end. At the end of the year, the Dane finished third in the GT4 International Cup with the same team. Møller Madsen then stayed with Phoenix Racing to defend the title in 2019, in which he took a lone win at Zandvoort as he ended the year sixth in points in his final season with the team.

Having been set to join Absolute Racing's GT4 operations in GT World Challenge Asia for 2020, Møller Madsen joined Allied-Racing for a dual program in ADAC GT4 Germany and the GT4 European Series as pandemic-related issues forced the GTWC Asia season to be cancelled. In the former, Møller Madsen won on debut at the Nürburgring, before taking wins at the Red Bull Ring, Lausitzring and Oschersleben as he clinched his only ADAC GT4 Germany title by one point. Racing in the Pro-Am class in the latter, the Dane took a lone class win at Misano by finishing third overall, before taking one more overall podium to end the season third in the Pro-Am standings.

Møller Madsen remained with Allied-Racing for 2021, once again racing in both ADAC GT4 Germany and the GT4 European Series. In the former, Møller Madsen took two podiums in the first three rounds of the season before leaving Allied-Racing with immediate effect following the round at Zandvoort. After joining Team AVIA Sorg Rennsport for the round at the Hockenheimring, the Dane ended the season with W&S Motorsport, with whom he scored two podiums in the final round of the season. In the latter, Møller Madsen won race two at Spa, which helped him end the year 11th in points despite missing the season-ending round Barcelona.

Staying with W&S Motorsport for 2022, Møller Madsen only competed in ADAC GT4 Germany alongside Finn Zulauf. The Dane scored a lone podium at the Nürburgring as he finished the year 11th in points, despite missing the final round due to personal reasons following a 14-day prison sentence for a hit-and-run accident in Denmark.

Remaining in ADAC GT4 Germany for the following season, Møller Madsen joined Wimmer Werk Motorsport alongside Eric Scalvini for the first round, before being joined by Ivan Ekelchik. The pair ended the year 14th in points with a pole at the Lausitzring and a best result of fourth at the Nürburgring. During 2023, Møller Madsen joined SRS Team Sorg Rennsport for the final three rounds of the GT4 European Series, scoring a lone Silver cup podium at the Hockenheimring.

Møller Madsen continued with Wimmer Werk Motorsport for 2024 as he made his full-time return to the GT4 European Series. Alongside the returning Ekelchik, the duo scored a best result of fourth at Misano and ended the year 15th in points as they both left the team ahead of the season-ending Jeddah round.

== Karting record ==
=== Karting career summary ===
| Season | Series | Team | Position |
|---|---|---|---|
| 2005 | Open Belgian Championship — Cadet | | 19th |
| 2006 | Viking Trophy — ICA-J | Ward Racing | 6th |
| 2006 | Swedish Championship — ICA-J | Ward Racing | 29th |
| 2006 | Göteborgs Stora Pris — ICA-J | Ward Racing | 29th |
| 2006 | Tom Trana Trophy — ICA-J | Ward Racing | 14th |
| 2006 | Monaco Kart Cup — ICA-J | Ward Racing | 16th |
| 2006 | WSK International Series — ICA-J | | 39th |
| 2006 | Trofeo Delle Industrie — 100 Junior | | 54th |
| 2006 | Peugeot Super Kart — ICA-J | | 5th |
| 2007 | South Garda Winter Cup — KF3 | | 22nd |
| 2007 | Andrea Margutti Trophy — KF3 | | 15th |
| 2007 | NEZ Championship — ICA-J | | 9th |
| 2007 | Italian Open Masters — KF3 | | 36th |
| 2007 | Peugeot Super Kart — KF3 | X3M Racing | 1st |
| 2007 | Viking Trophy — KF3 | Ward Racing | 24th |
| 2007 | Monaco Kart Cup — KF3 | Ward Racing | 31st |
| 2007 | Asia-Pacific Karting Championship — KF3 | Ward Racing | 5th |
| 2008 | South Garda Winter Cup — KF3 | Tony Kart Junior RT | NC |
| 2008 | Andrea Margutti Trophy — KF3 | Tony Kart Junior RT | NC |
| 2008 | Karting European Championship — KF3 | Tony Kart Junior RT | 9th |
| 2008 | WSK International Series — KF3 | Tony Kart Junior RT | 11th |
| 2008 | Trofeo Delle Industrie — KF2 | Tony Kart Junior RT | 13th |
| 2008 | Tom Trana Trophy — KF3 | | 6th |
| 2008 | DASU Cup Danish Super Kart — KF3 | | 1st |
| 2009 | South Garda Winter Cup — KF2 | Energy Corse | 20th |
| 2009 | WSK International Series — KF2 | Energy Corse | 5th |
| 2009 | Andrea Margutti Trophy — KF2 | Energy Corse | 4th |
| 2009 | Viking Trophy — KF2 | Energy Corse | 3rd |
| 2009 | Deutsche Kart-Meisterschaft — KF2 | Energy Corse | 1st |
| 2009 | Grand Prix Open Karting — KF2 | Energy Corse | 46th |
| 2009 | Karting European Championship — KF2 | Energy Corse | 17th |
| 2009 | Karting World Cup — KF2 | Energy Corse | 11th |
| 2009 | Bridgestone Cup Europe — KF2 | | 1st |
| 2009 | SKUSA SuperNationals — KF2 | Energy Corse America | 1st |
| 2010 | South Garda Winter Cup — KF2 | Energy Corse | 3rd |
| 2010 | WSK Euro Series — KF2 | Energy Corse | 2nd |
| 2010 | WSK World Series — KF2 | Energy Corse | 26th |
| 2010 | Deutsche Kart-Meisterschaft — KF2 | Energy Corse | 1st |
| 2010 | Karting European Championship — KF2 | Energy Corse | 1st |
| 2010 | Karting World Cup — KF2 | Energy Corse | 3rd |
| 2010 | Bridgestone Cup Europe — KF2 | | 2nd |
| 2010 | Racehall of Champions — 100kg | | 2nd |
| 2010 | Racehall of Champions — Under 80kg | | 7th |
| 2010 | SKUSA SuperNationals — KF2 | Energy Corse America | 3rd |
| 2011 | South Garda Winter Cup — KF2 | Energy Corse | 20th |
| 2011 | Karting European Championship — KF2 | Energy Corse | NC |
| 2011 | WSK Master Series — KF2 | Energy Corse; Sean GP (Note: Møller Madsen competed for Energy Corse in Rounds 1–3 and ran for Sean GP in rounds 4–5.) | 16th |
| 2011 | WSK Euro Series — KF2 | Energy Corse; Sean GP; Tony Kart Racing Team (Note: Møller Madsen competed for Energy Corse in Rounds 1–2, ran for Sean GP in round 3 and for Tony Kart Racing Team in round 4.) | 20th |
| 2011 | Karting World Cup — KF2 | Sean GP | 25th |
| 2011 | Asia-Pacific Karting Championship — KF2 | Sean GP | 7th |
| 2011 | Coppa del Vesuvio — KF2 | | 9th |
| 2011 | Asia-Pacific Karting Open Championship — 125 Senior | | 1st |
| 2011 | Bridgestone Cup Europe — KF2 | | 1st |
| 2012 | Indonesia Kart Prix — KF2 | CRG | 2nd |
| 2012 | European Challenge X30 — X30 Senior | | 8th |
| 2012 | WSK Euro Series — KF2 | CRG | 93rd |
| 2012 | WSK Master Series — KF2 | | 18th |
| 2012 | Karting World Cup — KF2 | | NC |
| 2013 | Racehall of Champions — 100kg | | 7th |
| 2013 | Racehall of Champions — Under 80kg | | 10th |

== Racing record ==
=== Racing career summary ===
| Season | Series | Team | Races | Wins | Poles | F/Laps | Podiums | Points | Position |
|---|---|---|---|---|---|---|---|---|---|
| 2013 | Volkswagen Scirocco R-Cup | —N/a | 9 | 0 | 1 | 0 | 0 | 210 | 6th |
| 2014 | Volkswagen Scirocco R-Cup | —N/a | 10 | 0 | 1 | 0 | 2 | 250 | 5th |
| 2015 | Audi Sport TT Cup | —N/a | 12 | 1 | 3 | 2 | 7 | 206 | **2nd** |
| 2015 | Danish Supertourisme | Image Racing | 3 | 0 | 0 | 0 | 0 | 31 | 20th |
| 2016 | GT Series Sprint Cup – Silver | Phoenix Racing | 10 | 4 | 2 | 1 | 8 | 104 | **2nd** |
| 2016 | GT4 European Series – Pro | Phoenix Racing | 8 | 1 | 2 | 0 | 3 | 109 | **3rd** |
| 2016 | VLN Series – SP9 | Phoenix Racing | 1 | 0 | 0 | 0 | 0 | 0 | NC |
| 2016 | ADAC GT Masters | Phoenix Racing | 2 | 0 | 0 | 0 | 0 | 0 | NC |
| 2016 | 24 Hours of Nürburgring – SP10 | Prosport-Performance GmbH | 1 | 0 | 0 | 0 | 0 | —N/a | DNF |
| 2017 | Intercontinental GT Challenge – GT4 | PROsport Performance | 1 | 1 | 0 | 0 | 1 | 0 | NC |
| 2017 | Bathurst 12 Hour – C | PROsport Performance | 1 | 1 | 0 | 0 | 1 | —N/a | **1st** |
| 2017 | GT4 European Series Northern Cup – Pro-Am | PROsport Performance | 2 | 1 | 1 | 1 | 1 | 25 | 17th |
| 2017 | GT4 European Series Northern Cup – Silver | PROsport Performance | 2 | 0 | 0 | 0 | 0 | 0 | NC |
| 2017 | VLN Series – SP9 | Phoenix Racing | 3 | 0 | 0 | 0 | 1 | 0 | NC |
| 2017 | 24 Hours of Nürburgring – SP9 | Phoenix Racing | 1 | 0 | 0 | 0 | 0 | —N/a | 16th |
| 2017 | Danish Supertourisme | | 6 | 3 | 1 | 2 | 4 | 117 | 19th |
| 2018 | GT4 European Series – Silver | Phoenix Racing | 12 | 3 | 1 | 2 | 4 | 143 | **1st** |
| 2018 | VLN Series – SP10 | Phoenix Racing | 1 | 0 | 0 | 0 | 0 | 0 | NC |
| 2018 | 24 Hours of Nürburgring – SP8 | Phoenix Racing | 1 | 0 | 0 | 0 | 0 | —N/a | DNF |
| 2018 | GT4 International Cup | Phoenix Racing | 1 | 0 | 0 | 0 | 1 | —N/a | **2nd** |
| 2019 | GT4 European Series – Silver | Phoenix Racing | 12 | 1 | 0 | 0 | 3 | 108 | 6th |
| 2019 | VLN Series – SP9 Pro-Am | Phoenix Racing | 1 | 1 | 0 | 0 | 1 | 8.33 | 16th |
| 2019 | DMV Dunlop 60 – Class 5 | Phoenix Racing | 1 | 1 | 0 | 0 | 1 | 8.75 | 7th |
| 2019 | 24 Hours of Nürburgring – SP10 | Prosport-Performance GmbH | 1 | 0 | 0 | 0 | 0 | —N/a | DNF |
| 2020 | GT4 European Series – Pro-Am | Allied Racing | 10 | 1 | 2 | 1 | 9 | 170 | **3rd** |
| 2020 | ADAC GT4 Germany | Allied Racing | 12 | 4 | 0 | 0 | 8 | 174 | **1st** |
| 2020 | Nürburgring Langstrecken-Serie – SP10 | Allied Racing | 4 | 0 | 3 | 0 | 0 | 5.63 | 21st |
| 2020 | 24 Hours of Nürburgring – SP10 | Allied Racing | 1 | 0 | 0 | 0 | 0 | —N/a | NC |
| 2021 | GT4 European Series – Silver | Team Allied-Racing | 10 | 1 | 2 | 1 | 2 | 62 | 11th |
| 2021 | 24 Hours of Nürburgring – SP10 | Team Allied-Racing | 1 | 0 | 0 | 0 | 1 | —N/a | **3rd** |
| 2021 | ADAC GT4 Germany | Team Allied-Racing | 6 | 0 | 0 | 1 | 2 | 62 | 16th |
| 2021 | ADAC GT4 Germany | Team AVIA Sorg Rennsport | 2 | 0 | 0 | 0 | 0 | 62 | 16th |
| 2021 | ADAC GT4 Germany | W&S Motorsport | 2 | 0 | 0 | 0 | 2 | 62 | 16th |
| 2021 | Nürburgring Langstrecken-Serie – SP10 | Allied Racing | 1 | 0 | 0 | 0 | 0 | 0 | NC |
| 2021 | Nürburgring Langstrecken-Serie – SP10 | Walkenhorst Motorsport | 1 | 0 | 0 | 0 | 0 | 0 | NC |
| 2022 | ADAC GT4 Germany | AVIA W&S Motorsport | 10 | 0 | 0 | 1 | 1 | 78 | 11th |
| 2023 | ADAC GT4 Germany | Wimmer Werk Motorsport | 12 | 0 | 1 | 0 | 0 | 36 | 14th |
| 2023 | GT4 European Series – Silver | SRS Team Sorg Rennsport | 6 | 0 | 0 | 0 | 1 | 23 | 24th |
| 2024 | GT4 European Series – Silver | Wimmer Werk Motorsport | 10 | 0 | 0 | 0 | 0 | 36 | 15th |

=== Complete Blancpain GT Series Sprint Cup results ===
| Year | Team | Car | Class | 1 | 2 | 3 | 4 | 5 | 6 | 7 | 8 | 9 | 10 | Pos. | Points |
|---|---|---|---|---|---|---|---|---|---|---|---|---|---|---|---|
| 2016 | Phoenix Racing | Audi R8 LMS | Silver | MIS; QR; 19 | MIS; CR; 15 | BRH; QR; 19 | BRH; CR; Ret | NÜR; QR; 20 | NÜR; CR; 15 | **HUN**; **QR**; 9 | HUN; CR; Ret | **CAT**; **QR**; 7 | CAT; CR; 6 | 2nd | 104 |

=== Complete GT4 European Series results ===
(key) (Races in bold indicate pole position) (Races in italics indicate fastest lap)

| Year | Team | Car | Class | 1 | 2 | 3 | 4 | 5 | 6 | 7 | 8 | 9 | 10 | 11 | 12 | Pos | Points |
|---|---|---|---|---|---|---|---|---|---|---|---|---|---|---|---|---|---|
| 2016 | Phoenix Racing | Porsche Cayman PRO4 GT4 | Pro | MNZ; 1 | MNZ; 2 | **PAU**; **1**; 2 | **PAU**; **2**; 1 | SIL; 2 | SPA; 6 | HUN; 1; 8 | HUN; 2; 7 | ZAN; 1; 13 | ZAN; 2; 10 | | | 3rd | 109 |
| 2017 | PROsport Performance | Porsche Cayman PRO4 GT4 | Pro-Am | MIS; 1 Ret | **MIS**; **2**; 1 | | | | | | | | | | | 17th | 25 |
| 2017 | PROsport Performance | Porsche Cayman GT4 Clubsport MR | Pro-Am | | | BRH; 1 WD | BRH; 2 WD | RBR; 1 | RBR; 2 | SVK; 1 | SVK; 2 | ZAN; 1 | ZAN; 2 | | | 17th | 25 |
| 2017 | PROsport Performance | Porsche Cayman GT4 Clubsport MR | Silver | | | | | | | | | | | NÜR; 1; 20 | NÜR; 2; 30 | NC | 0 |
| 2018 | Phoenix Racing | Audi R8 LMS GT4 | Silver | **ZOL**; **1**; 1 | ZOL; 2; 5 | BRH; 1; 1 | BRH; 2; 5 | MIS; 1; 25 | **MIS**; **2**; 4 | SPA; 1; 1 | SPA; 2 Ret | HUN; 1; 11 | **HUN**; **2**; 5 | NÜR; 1; 6 | NÜR; 2; 5 | 1st | 143 |
| 2019 | Phoenix Racing | Audi R8 LMS GT4 | Silver | MNZ; 1; 4 | MNZ; 2; 3 | BRH; 1 Ret | BRH; 2; 2 | LEC; 1 Ret | LEC; 2 Ret | MIS; 1; 5 | MIS; 2; 10 | ZAN; 1; 1 | ZAN; 2; 5 | NÜR; 1; 4 | NÜR; 2; 30 | 6th | 108 |
| 2020 | Allied Racing | Porsche 718 Cayman GT4 Clubsport | Pro-Am | IMO; 1; 5 | IMO; 2; 4 | MIS; 1; 3 | **MIS**; **2**; 12 | NÜR; 1; 18 | NÜR; 2; 5 | ZAN; 1; 3 | ZAN; 2; 6 | SPA; 1; 4 | SPA; 2; 7 | LEC; 1 WD | LEC; 2 WD | 3rd | 170 |
| 2021 | Allied-Racing | Porsche 718 Cayman GT4 Clubsport | Silver | **MNZ**; **1**; 31 | MNZ; 2; 15 | LEC; 1; 6 | LEC; 2; 13 | **ZAN**; **1**; 3 | ZAN; 2; 12 | SPA; 1 Ret | SPA; 2; 1 | NÜR; 1 Ret | NÜR; 2; 28† | CAT; 1 | CAT; 2 | 11th | 62 |
| 2023 | SRS Team Sorg Rennsport | Porsche 718 Cayman GT4 RS Clubsport | Silver | MNZ; 1 | MNZ; 2 | LEC; 1 | LEC; 2 | SPA; 1 | SPA; 2 | MIS; 1; 9 | MIS; 2; 15 | HOC; 1 DSQ | HOC; 2; 4 | CAT; 1; 21 | CAT; 2; 8 | 24th | 23 |
| 2024 | Wimmer Werk Motorsport | Porsche 718 Cayman GT4 RS Clubsport | Silver | LEC; 1; 12 | LEC; 2; 18 | MIS; 1; 4 | MIS; 2; 5 | SPA; 1; 32 | SPA; 2; 9 | HOC; 1; 6 | HOC; 2 Ret | MNZ; 1; 8 | MNZ; 2; 21 | JED; 1 | JED; 2 | 15th | 36 |

=== Complete ADAC GT Masters results ===
(key) (Races in bold indicate pole position) (Races in italics indicate fastest lap)

| Year | Team | Car | 1 | 2 | 3 | 4 | 5 | 6 | 7 | 8 | 9 | 10 | 11 | 12 | 13 | 14 | Pos | Points |
|---|---|---|---|---|---|---|---|---|---|---|---|---|---|---|---|---|---|---|
| 2016 | Phoenix Racing | Audi R8 LMS | OSC; 1 | OSC; 2 | SAC; 1 | SAC; 2 | LAU; 1 | LAU; 2 | RBR; 1 | RBR; 2 | NÜR; 1; 25 | NÜR; 2 Ret | ZAN; 1 | ZAN; 2 | HOC; 1 | HOC; 2 | NC | 0 |

=== Complete ADAC GT4 Germany results ===
(key) (Races in bold indicate pole position) (Races in italics indicate fastest lap)

| Year | Team | Car | 1 | 2 | 3 | 4 | 5 | 6 | 7 | 8 | 9 | 10 | 11 | 12 | DC | Points |
|---|---|---|---|---|---|---|---|---|---|---|---|---|---|---|---|---|
| 2020 | Team Allied-Racing | Porsche 718 Cayman GT4 Clubsport | NÜR; 1; 1 | NÜR; 2; 3 | HOC; 1; 3 | HOC; 2; 2 | SAC; 1 Ret | SAC; 2; 18 | RBR; 1 Ret | RBR; 2; 1 | LAU; 1; 1 | **LAU**; **2**; 5 | OSC; 1; 3 | OSC; 2; 1 | 1st | 174 |
| 2021 | Team Allied-Racing | Porsche 718 Cayman GT4 Clubsport | OSC1; 1; 6 | OSC1; 2; 5 | RBR; 1; 3 | RBR; 2; 3 | ZAN; 1; 19 | ZAN; 2; 9 | SAC; 1 | SAC; 2 | | | | | 16th | 62 |
| 2021 | Team AVIA Sorg Rennsport | BMW M4 GT4 | | | | | | | | | HOC; 1; 7 | HOC; 2; 14 | | | 16th | 62 |
| 2021 | W&S Motorsport | Porsche 718 Cayman GT4 Clubsport | | | | | | | | | | | NÜR; 1; 3 | NÜR; 2; 2 | 16th | 62 |
| 2022 | AVIA W&S Motorsport | Porsche 718 Cayman GT4 Clubsport | OSC; 1; 4 | OSC; 2 Ret | RBR; 1; 5 | RBR; 2; 17 | ZAN; 1; 5 | ZAN; 2 Ret | NÜR; 1; 3 | NÜR; 2; 8 | SAC; 1; 5 | SAC; 2; 8 | HOC; 1 | HOC; 2 | 11th | 78 |
| 2023 | Wimmer Werk Motorsport | Porsche 718 Cayman GT4 Clubsport | OSC; 1; 17 | OSC; 2; 17 | ZAN; 1; 24 | ZAN; 2; 23 | NÜR; 1; 5 | NÜR; 2; 4 | **LAU**; **1**; 5 | LAU; 2; 21 | SAC; 1; 6 | SAC; 2; 9 | HOC; 1; 5 | HOC; 2 Ret | 14th | 63 |
