= 2024 GT World Challenge Europe Sprint Cup =

Motorsports season

The 2024 Fanatec GT World Challenge Europe Sprint Cup was the twelfth season of the GT World Challenge Europe Sprint Cup following on from the demise of the SRO Motorsports Group's FIA GT1 World Championship (an auto racing series for grand tourer cars), the fourth with the sponsorship of Fanatec.

The season began on 4 May at Brands Hatch, and ended on 13 October at Circuit de Barcelona-Catalunya.

== Calendar ==
The calendar was released on 1 July 2023 at the SRO's annual 24 Hours of Spa press conference, featuring five rounds. Several adjustments were announced, including Circuit de Barcelona-Catalunya joining the sprint schedule after being shuffled out of the endurance schedule, and the addition of Circuit de Nevers Magny-Cours after a year away. Circuit Ricardo Tormo and Circuit Zandvoort will not return to the sprint schedule, after three and five years in the series respectively.

Round	Circuit	Date	Map
1	(United Kingdom) Brands Hatch, Kent	4–5 May	2024 GT World Challenge Europe Sprint Cup is located in Europe
2	(Italy) Misano World Circuit Marco Simoncelli, Misano Adriatico	18 May	2024 GT World Challenge Europe Sprint Cup is located in Europe
3	(Germany) Hockenheimring, Hockenheim	20–21 July	2024 GT World Challenge Europe Sprint Cup is located in Europe
4	(France) Circuit de Nevers Magny-Cours, Magny-Cours	24–25 August	2024 GT World Challenge Europe Sprint Cup is located in Europe
5	(Spain) Circuit de Barcelona-Catalunya, Montmeló	12–13 October	2024 GT World Challenge Europe Sprint Cup is located in Europe

== Entry list ==
Team	Car	No.	Drivers	Class	Rounds
(Germany) Liqui Moly Team Engstler by OneGroup	Audi R8 LMS Evo II 1–2, 4–5; Lamborghini Huracán GT3 Evo 2 3	6	(Germany) Luca Engstler	G	All
(Germany) Liqui Moly Team Engstler by OneGroup	Audi R8 LMS Evo II 1–2, 4–5; Lamborghini Huracán GT3 Evo 2 3	6	(Austria) Max Hofer	G	All
(Belgium) Comtoyou Racing	Aston Martin Vantage AMR GT3 Evo	7	(Belgium) Nicolas Baert	P	All
(Belgium) Comtoyou Racing	Aston Martin Vantage AMR GT3 Evo	7	(Italy) Mattia Drudi	P	All
(Belgium) Comtoyou Racing	Aston Martin Vantage AMR GT3 Evo	11	(United Kingdom) James Jakes	G	3–5 (Note: Petru Umbrărescu withdrew from round 5 after the Friday practice sessions due to health reasons. Jakes was allowed to compete solo for the remainder of the event.)
(Belgium) Comtoyou Racing	Aston Martin Vantage AMR GT3 Evo	11	(Romania) Petru Umbrărescu	G	3, 5
(Belgium) Comtoyou Racing	Aston Martin Vantage AMR GT3 Evo	11	(Denmark) Sebastian Øgaard	G	4
(Belgium) Comtoyou Racing	Aston Martin Vantage AMR GT3 Evo	12	(Netherlands) Dante Rappange	S	All
(Belgium) Comtoyou Racing	Aston Martin Vantage AMR GT3 Evo	12	(United Kingdom) Charles Clark	S	1
(Belgium) Comtoyou Racing	Aston Martin Vantage AMR GT3 Evo	12	(Belgium) Lorens Lecertua	S	2–5
(Belgium) Comtoyou Racing	Aston Martin Vantage AMR GT3 Evo	21	(Belgium) Matisse Lismont	G	All
(Belgium) Comtoyou Racing	Aston Martin Vantage AMR GT3 Evo	21	(United Kingdom) James Jakes	G	1–2
(Belgium) Comtoyou Racing	Aston Martin Vantage AMR GT3 Evo	21	(United Kingdom) David Pittard	G	3–5
(Belgium) Boutsen VDS	Mercedes-AMG GT3 Evo	9	(Germany) Maximilian Götz	P	All
(Belgium) Boutsen VDS	Mercedes-AMG GT3 Evo	9	(Andorra) Jules Gounon	P	All
(Belgium) Boutsen VDS	Mercedes-AMG GT3 Evo	10	(France) César Gazeau	S	All
(Belgium) Boutsen VDS	Mercedes-AMG GT3 Evo	10	(France) Aurélien Panis	S	All
(Switzerland) Emil Frey Racing	Ferrari 296 GT3	14	(United Kingdom) Ben Green	P	All
(Switzerland) Emil Frey Racing	Ferrari 296 GT3	14	(Finland) Konsta Lappalainen	P	All
(Switzerland) Emil Frey Racing	Ferrari 296 GT3	69	(Italy) Giacomo Altoè	P	All
(Switzerland) Emil Frey Racing	Ferrari 296 GT3	69	(Netherlands) Thierry Vermeulen	P	All
(Monaco) Eurodent GSM Team	Lamborghini Huracán GT3 Evo 2	18	(United Kingdom) James Kell	S	1 (Note: James Kell withdrew from round 1 shortly before the qualifying sessions due to health reasons. Påverud was allowed to compete solo for the remainder of the event.)
(Monaco) Eurodent GSM Team	Lamborghini Huracán GT3 Evo 2	18	(Norway) Marcus Påverud	S	1
(Monaco) Eurodent GSM Team	Lamborghini Huracán GT3 Evo 2	18	(Italy) Marco Butti	S	2
(Monaco) Eurodent GSM Team	Lamborghini Huracán GT3 Evo 2	18	(Italy) Pietro Delli Guanti	S	2
(France) Saintéloc Racing	Audi R8 LMS Evo II	25	(France) Paul Evrard	G	All
(France) Saintéloc Racing	Audi R8 LMS Evo II	25	(Belgium) Gilles Magnus	G	All
(France) Saintéloc Racing	Audi R8 LMS Evo II	26	(Ukraine) Ivan Klymenko	S	All
(France) Saintéloc Racing	Audi R8 LMS Evo II	26	(United Kingdom) Hugo Cook	S	1
(France) Saintéloc Racing	Audi R8 LMS Evo II	26	(Belgium) Gilles Stadsbader	S	2
(France) Saintéloc Racing	Audi R8 LMS Evo II	26	(Norway) Marcus Påverud	S	3–4
(France) Saintéloc Racing	Audi R8 LMS Evo II	26	(Argentina) Ezequiel Pérez Companc	S	5
(Belgium) Team WRT	BMW M4 GT3	30	(Australia) Calan Williams	S	All
(Belgium) Team WRT	BMW M4 GT3	30	(United Kingdom) Sam De Haan	S	1–4
(Belgium) Team WRT	BMW M4 GT3	30	(Indonesia) Sean Gelael	S	5
(Belgium) Team WRT	BMW M4 GT3	32	(Belgium) Dries Vanthoor	P	All
(Belgium) Team WRT	BMW M4 GT3	32	(Belgium) Charles Weerts	P	All
(Belgium) Team WRT	BMW M4 GT3	46	(Belgium) Maxime Martin	P	1–2
(Belgium) Team WRT	BMW M4 GT3	46	(Italy) Valentino Rossi	P	1–2
(France) Schumacher CLRT	Porsche 911 GT3 R (992)	44	(France) Stéphane Denoual	B	2–5
(France) Schumacher CLRT	Porsche 911 GT3 R (992)	44	(France) Steven Palette	B	2–5
(United States) Winward Racing Team Mann-Filter	Mercedes-AMG GT3 Evo	48	(Austria) Lucas Auer	P	All
(United States) Winward Racing Team Mann-Filter	Mercedes-AMG GT3 Evo	48	(Germany) Maro Engel	P	All
(United States) Winward Racing	Mercedes-AMG GT3 Evo	57	(Republic of Ireland) Reece Barr	S	1–3, 5
(United States) Winward Racing	Mercedes-AMG GT3 Evo	57	(Norway) Magnus Gustavsen	S	1–3
(United States) Winward Racing	Mercedes-AMG GT3 Evo	57	(Belgium) Gilles Stadsbader	S	5
Racing Team Turkey	Ferrari 296 GT3	51	(Republic of Ireland) Charlie Eastwood	G	1–3
Racing Team Turkey	Ferrari 296 GT3	51	(Turkey) Salih Yoluç	G	1–3
(Italy) AF Corse	Ferrari 296 GT3	52	(Singapore) Sean Hudspeth	S	All
(Italy) AF Corse	Ferrari 296 GT3	52	(Belgium) Jef Machiels	S	All
(Italy) AF Corse	Ferrari 296 GT3	71	(Italy) Eliseo Donno	S	All
(Italy) AF Corse	Ferrari 296 GT3	71	(United Kingdom) Tom Fleming	S	All
(United Kingdom) Sky – Tempesta Racing	Ferrari 296 GT3	93	(Italy) Eddie Cheever III	B	2–5
(United Kingdom) Sky – Tempesta Racing	Ferrari 296 GT3	93	(Hong Kong) Jonathan Hui	B	2–5
(Italy) Dinamic GT	Porsche 911 GT3 R (992)	54	(Germany) Marvin Dienst	B	2
(Italy) Dinamic GT	Porsche 911 GT3 R (992)	54	(Austria) Philipp Sager	B	2
(Germany) Tresor Attempto Racing	Audi R8 LMS Evo II	66	Andrey Mukovoz (Note: Mukovoz is Russian, but he competes as a neutral competitor as Russian national emblems were banned by the FIA following the Russian invasion of Ukraine. Gvazava, also a Russian, competes under a Kyrgyz licence for the same reason.)	B	2–5
(Germany) Tresor Attempto Racing	Audi R8 LMS Evo II	66	(Luxembourg) Dylan Pereira	B	2–5
(Germany) Tresor Attempto Racing	Audi R8 LMS Evo II	88	(Italy) Lorenzo Ferrari	P	1–2
(Germany) Tresor Attempto Racing	Audi R8 LMS Evo II	88	(Germany) Christopher Haase	P	1–2
(Germany) Tresor Attempto Racing	Audi R8 LMS Evo II	88	(Italy) Lorenzo Ferrari	G	3–5
(Germany) Tresor Attempto Racing	Audi R8 LMS Evo II	88	(Italy) Lorenzo Patrese	G	3–5
(Germany) Tresor Attempto Racing	Audi R8 LMS Evo II	99	(Germany) Alex Aka	P	All
(Germany) Tresor Attempto Racing	Audi R8 LMS Evo II	99	(Switzerland) Ricardo Feller	P	All
(United Kingdom) Barwell Motorsport	Lamborghini Huracán GT3 Evo 2	72	(Finland) Patrick Kujala	B	2–5
(United Kingdom) Barwell Motorsport	Lamborghini Huracán GT3 Evo 2	72	(Luxembourg) Gabriel Rindone	B	2–5
(United Kingdom) Barwell Motorsport	Lamborghini Huracán GT3 Evo 2	78	(United Kingdom) Rob Collard	B	2–5
(United Kingdom) Barwell Motorsport	Lamborghini Huracán GT3 Evo 2	78	(United Kingdom) Sandy Mitchell	B	2–5
(Austria) Eastalent Racing	Audi R8 LMS Evo II	84	(Germany) Christopher Haase	P	4
(Austria) Eastalent Racing	Audi R8 LMS Evo II	84	(Austria) Simon Reicher	P	4
(Austria) Eastalent Racing	Audi R8 LMS Evo II	84	(Poland) Karol Basz	S	5
(Austria) Eastalent Racing	Audi R8 LMS Evo II	84	(Austria) Simon Reicher	S	5
(Italy) Imperiale Racing	Lamborghini Huracán GT3 Evo 2	85	(Kyrgyzstan) Dmitry Gvazava	B	2–5
(Italy) Imperiale Racing	Lamborghini Huracán GT3 Evo 2	85	(Belgium) Ugo de Wilde	B	2–5
(Argentina) Madpanda Motorsport	Mercedes-AMG GT3 Evo	90	(Argentina) Ezequiel Pérez Companc	P	1–3
(Argentina) Madpanda Motorsport	Mercedes-AMG GT3 Evo	90	(United Kingdom) Alexander Sims	P	1
(Argentina) Madpanda Motorsport	Mercedes-AMG GT3 Evo	90	(United Kingdom) Phil Keen	P	2–3
(Argentina) Madpanda Motorsport	Mercedes-AMG GT3 Evo	90	(Argentina) Ezequiel Pérez Companc	S	4
(Argentina) Madpanda Motorsport	Mercedes-AMG GT3 Evo	90	(Germany) Tom Kalender	S	4
(Germany) Rutronik Racing	Porsche 911 GT3 R (992)	96	(Germany) Sven Müller	P	All
(Germany) Rutronik Racing	Porsche 911 GT3 R (992)	96	(Switzerland) Patric Niederhauser	P	All
(Germany) Rutronik Racing	Porsche 911 GT3 R (992)	97	(United States) Dustin Blattner	B	2–5
(Germany) Rutronik Racing	Porsche 911 GT3 R (992)	97	(Germany) Dennis Marschall	B	2–5
(France) CSA Racing	Audi R8 LMS Evo II	111	(France) Simon Gachet	G	All
(France) CSA Racing	Audi R8 LMS Evo II	111	(Switzerland) Lucas Légeret	G	All
(United Kingdom) Garage 59	McLaren 720S GT3 Evo	159	(United Kingdom) Tom Gamble	P	All
(United Kingdom) Garage 59	McLaren 720S GT3 Evo	159	(Germany) Benjamin Goethe	P	All
(United Kingdom) Garage 59	McLaren 720S GT3 Evo	188	(Monaco) Louis Prette	B	2–5
(United Kingdom) Garage 59	McLaren 720S GT3 Evo	188	(United Kingdom) James Cottingham	B	2
(United Kingdom) Garage 59	McLaren 720S GT3 Evo	188	(Portugal) Miguel Ramos	B	3–5
(United Kingdom) / Century Motorsport (Note: Car No. 991 entered as Century Motorsport at rounds 2–4, and as Paradine Competition at round 5.); (United Kingdom) / Paradine Competition	BMW M4 GT3	991	(United Kingdom) Dan Harper	B	2–5
(United Kingdom) / Century Motorsport; (United Kingdom) / Paradine Competition	BMW M4 GT3	991	(United Kingdom) Darren Leung	B	2–5

Icon	Class
P	Pro Cup
G	Gold Cup
S	Silver Cup
B	Bronze Cup

Notes:

- Dinamic GT was scheduled to run a pair of Ford Mustang GT3s, but parted ways with the American brand prior to the start of the season. Christopher Mies and Frédéric Vervisch were set to share a Pro-class entry, with Ben Barker and Philipp Sager in a Bronze Cup car. A Pro-class Proton Competition entry later appeared on the season entry list, in what looked to be a replacement programme akin to the one set up by the team in the Endurance Cup. However, after sitting out the opening round, a Ford Performance spokesperson confirmed the programme would not go ahead.
- GMB Motorsport was scheduled to enter an Aston Martin Vantage AMR GT3 Evo in Silver Cup for Gustav Birch and Simon Birch, but the team folded prior to the start of the season.
- Liqui Moly Team Engstler by OneGroup was scheduled to enter a Grasser Racing Team-run Lamborghini Huracán GT3 Evo 2 in Pro, but switched to an Audi R8 LMS Evo II prior to the start of the season, also moving classes to Gold Cup. The team switched back to a Lamborghini for round 3 at Hockenheim. The team reverted to an Audi for the final two rounds.
- Mikkel C. Johansen was scheduled to compete for Eurodent GSM Team, but did not appear at any rounds.

== Race results ==
Round		Circuit	Pole position	Overall winners	Gold winners	Silver winners	Bronze winners	Report
1	R1	(United Kingdom) Brands Hatch	(Switzerland) No. 14 Emil Frey Racing	(Belgium) No. 32 Team WRT	(Germany) No. 6 Liqui Moly Team Engstler by OneGroup	(Belgium) No. 10 Boutsen VDS	Did not participate	Report
1	R1	(United Kingdom) Brands Hatch	(United Kingdom) Ben Green (Finland) Konsta Lappalainen	(Belgium) Dries Vanthoor (Belgium) Charles Weerts	(Germany) Luca Engstler (Austria) Max Hofer	(France) César Gazeau (France) Aurélien Panis	Did not participate	Report
1	R2	(United Kingdom) Brands Hatch	(United States) No. 48 Winward Racing Team Mann-Filter	(United States) No. 48 Winward Racing Team Mann-Filter	(France) No. 25 Saintéloc Racing	(Italy) No. 71 AF Corse	Did not participate	Report
1	R2	(United Kingdom) Brands Hatch	(Austria) Lucas Auer (Germany) Maro Engel	(Austria) Lucas Auer (Germany) Maro Engel	(France) Paul Evrard (Belgium) Gilles Magnus	(Italy) Eliseo Donno (United Kingdom) Tom Fleming	Did not participate	Report
2	R1	(Italy) Misano	(Belgium) No. 46 Team WRT	(Belgium) No. 46 Team WRT	(France) No. 25 Saintéloc Racing	(Belgium) No. 30 Team WRT	(Italy) No. 54 Dinamic GT	Report
2	R1	(Italy) Misano	(Belgium) Maxime Martin (Italy) Valentino Rossi	(Belgium) Maxime Martin (Italy) Valentino Rossi	(France) Paul Evrard (Belgium) Gilles Magnus	(United Kingdom) Sam De Haan (Australia) Calan Williams	(Germany) Marvin Dienst (Austria) Philipp Sager	Report
2	R2	(Italy) Misano	(Belgium) No. 32 Team WRT	(Belgium) No. 32 Team WRT	(France) No. 111 CSA Racing	(Belgium) No. 30 Team WRT	(United Kingdom) No. 93 Sky – Tempesta Racing	Report
2	R2	(Italy) Misano	(Belgium) Dries Vanthoor (Belgium) Charles Weerts	(Belgium) Dries Vanthoor (Belgium) Charles Weerts	(France) Simon Gachet (Switzerland) Lucas Légeret	(United Kingdom) Sam De Haan (Australia) Calan Williams	(Italy) Eddie Cheever III (Hong Kong) Jonathan Hui	Report
3	R1	(Germany) Hockenheim	(Italy) No. 71 AF Corse	(United States) No. 48 Winward Racing Team Mann-Filter	(Germany) No. 6 Liqui Moly Team Engstler by OneGroup	(Italy) No. 71 AF Corse	(United Kingdom) No. 991 Century Motorsport	Report
3	R1	(Germany) Hockenheim	(Italy) Eliseo Donno (United Kingdom) Tom Fleming	(Austria) Lucas Auer (Germany) Maro Engel	(Germany) Luca Engstler (Austria) Max Hofer	(Italy) Eliseo Donno (United Kingdom) Tom Fleming	(United Kingdom) Dan Harper (United Kingdom) Darren Leung	Report
3	R2	(Germany) Hockenheim	(Germany) No. 6 Liqui Moly Team Engstler by OneGroup	(Switzerland) No. 14 Emil Frey Racing	(Germany) No. 88 Tresor Attempto Racing	(Belgium) No. 30 Team WRT	(United Kingdom) No. 991 Century Motorsport	Report
3	R2	(Germany) Hockenheim	(Germany) Luca Engstler (Austria) Max Hofer	(United Kingdom) Ben Green (Finland) Konsta Lappalainen	(Italy) Lorenzo Patrese (Italy) Lorenzo Ferrari	(United Kingdom) Sam De Haan (Australia) Calan Williams	(United Kingdom) Dan Harper (United Kingdom) Darren Leung	Report
4	R1	(France) Magny-Cours	(Switzerland) No. 14 Emil Frey Racing	(Belgium) No. 32 Team WRT	(Germany) No. 88 Tresor Attempto Racing	(Argentina) No. 90 Madpanda Motorsport	(United Kingdom) No. 78 Barwell Motorsport	Report
4	R1	(France) Magny-Cours	(United Kingdom) Ben Green (Finland) Konsta Lappalainen	(Belgium) Dries Vanthoor (Belgium) Charles Weerts	(Italy) Lorenzo Patrese (Italy) Lorenzo Ferrari	(Argentina) Ezequiel Pérez Companc (Germany) Tom Kalender	(United Kingdom) Sandy Mitchell (United Kingdom) Rob Collard	Report
4	R2	(France) Magny-Cours	(Belgium) No. 9 Boutsen VDS	(United States) No. 48 Winward Racing Team Mann-Filter	(Germany) No. 88 Tresor Attempto Racing	(Italy) No. 71 AF Corse	(Germany) No. 97 Rutronik Racing	Report
4	R2	(France) Magny-Cours	(Andorra) Jules Gounon (Germany) Maximilian Götz	(Austria) Lucas Auer (Germany) Maro Engel	(Italy) Lorenzo Patrese (Italy) Lorenzo Ferrari	(Italy) Eliseo Donno (United Kingdom) Tom Fleming	(Germany) Dennis Marschall (United States) Dustin Blattner	Report
5	R1 (Note: Team WRT won an appeal regarding safety car procedure in Barcelona Race 1, because the pit window was not postponed under the safety car. The classification of race 1 was cancelled, with no points awarded.)	(Spain) Barcelona-Catalunya	(United Kingdom) No. 72 Barwell Motorsport	(Belgium) No. 9 Boutsen VDS	(France) No. 111 CSA Racing	(Belgium) No. 10 Boutsen VDS	(United Kingdom) No. 188 Garage 59	Report
5	R1	(Spain) Barcelona-Catalunya	(Finland) Patrick Kujala (Luxembourg) Gabriel Rindone	(Andorra) Jules Gounon (Germany) Maximilian Götz	(France) Simon Gachet (Switzerland) Lucas Légeret	(France) César Gazeau (France) Aurélien Panis	(Monaco) Louis Prette (Portugal) Miguel Ramos	Report
5	R2	(Spain) Barcelona-Catalunya	(Germany) No. 96 Rutronik Racing	(Germany) No. 96 Rutronik Racing	(Germany) No. 88 Tresor Attempto Racing	(Belgium) No. 10 Boutsen VDS	(Germany) No. 97 Rutronik Racing	Report
5	R2	(Spain) Barcelona-Catalunya	(Germany) Sven Müller (Switzerland) Patric Niederhauser	(Germany) Sven Müller (Switzerland) Patric Niederhauser	(Italy) Lorenzo Patrese (Italy) Lorenzo Ferrari	(France) César Gazeau (France) Aurélien Panis	(Germany) Dennis Marschall (United States) Dustin Blattner	Report

== Championship standings ==
Scoring system

Championship points are awarded for the first ten positions in each race. The pole-sitter also receives one point.

Position	1st	2nd	3rd	4th	5th	6th	7th	8th	9th	10th	Pole
Points	16.5	12	9.5	7.5	6	4.5	3	2	1	0.5	1

=== Drivers' championships ===
==== Overall ====
Pos.	Drivers	Team	BRH (United Kingdom)		MIS (Italy)		HOC (Germany)		MAG (France)		CAT (Spain)		Points
1	(Austria) Lucas Auer (Germany) Maro Engel	(United States) Winward Racing Team Mann-Filter	3	1^{P}	5	2	1	3	2	1	3^{F}	4	107
2	(Belgium) Dries Vanthoor (Belgium) Charles Weerts	(Belgium) Team WRT	1	7	2^{F}	1^{PF}	2^{F}	2	1	2^{F}	9	7	104.5
3	(United Kingdom) Ben Green (Finland) Konsta Lappalainen	(Switzerland) Emil Frey Racing	2^{P}	5	4	7	3	1^{F}	5^{P}	13	4	12	62.5
4	(Italy) Giacomo Altoè (Netherlands) Thierry Vermeulen	(Switzerland) Emil Frey Racing	11	2	3	4	8	22	4	10	10	6	43.5
5	(Germany) Sven Müller (Switzerland) Patric Niederhauser	(Germany) Rutronik Racing	14	8	7	5	7	14	3	16	2	1^{P}	41
6	(United Kingdom) Tom Gamble (Germany) Benjamin Goethe	(United Kingdom) Garage 59	5	6	8	6	9	8	9	5	8	3	36.5
7	(Germany) Maximilian Götz (Andorra) Jules Gounon	(Belgium) Boutsen VDS	DNS	3	9	9	12	4	19^{F}	3^{P}	1	5	35.5
8	(Belgium) Maxime Martin (Italy) Valentino Rossi	(Belgium) Team WRT	15	25†	1^{P}	3							27
9	(Germany) Alex Aka (Switzerland) Ricardo Feller	(Germany) Tresor Attempto Racing	4^{F}	4	Ret	26	Ret	Ret	12	6	16	8	21.5
10	(Australia) Calan Williams	(Belgium) Team WRT	8	15	6	10	5	5	22	14	15	14	19
10	(United Kingdom) Sam De Haan	(Belgium) Team WRT	8	15	6	10	5	5	22	14			19
11	(Belgium) Nicolas Baert (Italy) Mattia Drudi	(Belgium) Comtoyou Racing	Ret	14	10	33†	17	6	15	DNS	Ret	2	17
12	(Italy) Lorenzo Ferrari	(Germany) Tresor Attempto Racing	17	16	12	12	11	7	6	4	19	9	16
12	(Italy) Lorenzo Patrese	(Germany) Tresor Attempto Racing					11	7	6	4	19	9	16
13	(Italy) Eliseo Donno (United Kingdom) Tom Fleming	(Italy) AF Corse	10	11	WD	WD	4^{P}	21	17	8	14	24	11
14	(Germany) Luca Engstler (Austria) Max Hofer	(Germany) Liqui Moly Team Engstler by OneGroup	7	10	21	15	6	13^{P}	13	19	7	10	9.5
15	(France) Simon Gachet (Switzerland) Lucas Légeret	(France) CSA Racing	9	13	32	11	13	9	7	7	6	28	8
16	(France) César Gazeau (France) Aurélien Panis	(Belgium) Boutsen VDS	6	12	30	32	16	12	11	12	5	11	4.5
17	(Argentina) Ezequiel Pérez Companc	(Argentina) Madpanda Motorsport	19	17	11	8	Ret	10	8	18			4.5
17	(Argentina) Ezequiel Pérez Companc	(France) Saintéloc Racing									12	17	4.5
18	(United Kingdom) Phil Keen	(Argentina) Madpanda Motorsport			11	8	Ret	10					2.5
19	(Germany) Tom Kalender	(Argentina) Madpanda Motorsport							8	18			2
20	(France) Paul Evrard (Belgium) Gilles Magnus	(France) Saintéloc Racing	13	9	13	13	10	16	14	11	17	13	1.5
20	(Germany) Christopher Haase	(Germany) Tresor Attempto Racing	17	16	12	12							1.5
20	(Germany) Christopher Haase	(Austria) Eastalent Racing							10	9			1.5
20	(Austria) Simon Reicher	(Austria) Eastalent Racing							10	9	13	15	1.5
21	(Finland) Patrick Kujala (Luxembourg) Gabriel Rindone	(United Kingdom) Barwell Motorsport			26	28	25	23	29	24	22^{P}	Ret	1
–	(United Kingdom) Dan Harper (United Kingdom) Darren Leung	(United Kingdom) Century Motorsport			17	20	15	11	21	26	21	22	0
–	(Belgium) Matisse Lismont	(Belgium) Comtoyou Racing	23†	24	28	31	21	30	27	DNS	11	20	0
–	(United Kingdom) David Pittard	(Belgium) Comtoyou Racing					21	30	27	DNS	11	20	0
–	(Ukraine) Ivan Klymenko	(France) Saintéloc Racing	16	22	31	14	14	28	16	Ret	12	17	0
–	(Singapore) Sean Hudspeth (Belgium) Jef Machiels	(Italy) AF Corse	12	18	18	18	18	20	23	28	20	19	0
–	(Poland) Karol Basz	(Austria) Eastalent Racing									13	15	0
–	(Indonesia) Sean Gelael	(Belgium) Team WRT									15	14	0
–	(Norway) Marcus Påverud	(Monaco) Eurodent GSM Team	22	23									0
–	(Norway) Marcus Påverud	(France) Saintéloc Racing					14	28	16	Ret			0
–	(Germany) Marvin Dienst (Austria) Philipp Sager	(Italy) Dinamic GT			14	30							0
–	(Belgium) Gilles Stadsbader	(France) Saintéloc Racing			31	14							0
–	(Belgium) Gilles Stadsbader	(United States) Winward Racing									Ret	WD	0
–	(United Kingdom) Rob Collard (United Kingdom) Sandy Mitchell	(United Kingdom) Barwell Motorsport			19	24	19	15	18	25	22	21	0
–	(Kyrgyzstan) Dmitry Gvazava (Belgium) Ugo de Wilde	(Italy) Imperiale Racing			15	21	23	25	24	27	Ret	27	0
–	(United Kingdom) James Jakes	(Belgium) Comtoyou Racing	23†	24	28	31	28	Ret	32†	15	Ret	Ret	0
–	(Denmark) Sebastian Øgaard	(Belgium) Comtoyou Racing							32†	15			0
–	(United States) Dustin Blattner (Germany) Dennis Marschall	(Germany) Rutronik Racing			DNS	23	27	19	20	17	23	16^{F}	0
–	Andrey Mukovoz (Luxembourg) Dylan Pereira	(Germany) Tresor Attempto Racing			16	27	24	18	26	23	Ret	25	0
–	(Republic of Ireland) Charlie Eastwood (Turkey) Salih Yoluç	Racing Team Turkey	21	20^{F}	22	16							0
–	(United Kingdom) Hugo Cook	(France) Saintéloc Racing	16	22									0
–	(Italy) Eddie Cheever III (Hong Kong) Jonathan Hui	(United Kingdom) Sky – Tempesta Racing			20	17	20	17	28	22	26	23	0
–	(United Kingdom) Alexander Sims	(Argentina) Madpanda Motorsport	19	17									0
–	(Netherlands) Dante Rappange	(Belgium) Comtoyou Racing	20	21	27	19	29	29	25	DNS	Ret	18	0
–	(Republic of Ireland) Reece Barr	(United States) Winward Racing	18	19	24	22	22	26			Ret	WD	0
–	(Norway) Magnus Gustavsen	(United States) Winward Racing	18	19	24	22	22	26					0
–	(Belgium) Lorens Lecertua	(Belgium) Comtoyou Racing			27	19	29	29	25	DNS	Ret	18	0
–	(Monaco) Louis Prette	(United Kingdom) Garage 59			23	25	Ret	27	30†	20	18	Ret	0
–	(Portugal) Miguel Ramos	(United Kingdom) Garage 59					Ret	27	30†	20	18	Ret	0
–	(United Kingdom) Charles Clark	(Belgium) Comtoyou Racing	20	21									0
–	(France) Stéphane Denoual (France) Steven Palette	(France) Schumacher CLRT			29	Ret	26	24	31†	21	25	26	0
–	(United Kingdom) James Cottingham	(United Kingdom) Garage 59			23	25							0
–	(Italy) Marco Butti (Italy) Pietro Delli Guanti	(Monaco) Eurodent GSM Team			25	29							0
–	(Romania) Petru Umbrărescu	(Belgium) Comtoyou Racing					28	Ret			WD	WD	0
–	(United Kingdom) James Kell	(Monaco) Eurodent GSM Team	WD	WD									0
Pos.	Drivers	Team	BRH (United Kingdom)		MIS (Italy)		HOC (Germany)		MAG (France)		CAT (Spain)		Points

Key
Colour	Result
Gold	Race winner
Silver	2nd place
Bronze	3rd place
Green	Points finish
Blue	Non-points finish
Blue	Non-classified finish (NC)
Purple	Did not finish (Ret)
Black	Disqualified (DSQ)
Black	Excluded (EX)
White	Did not start (DNS)
White	Race cancelled (C)
White	Withdrew (WD)
Blank	Did not participate

P – Pole
F – Fastest Lap

==== Gold Cup ====
Pos.	Drivers	Team	BRH (United Kingdom)		MIS (Italy)		HOC (Germany)		MAG (France)		CAT (Spain)		Points
1	(Germany) Luca Engstler (Austria) Max Hofer	(Germany) Liqui Moly Team Engstler by OneGroup	7	10	21	15	6^{P}	13^{P}	13^{PF}	19^{P}	7^{F}	10	107.5
2	(France) Paul Evrard (Belgium) Gilles Magnus	(France) Saintéloc Racing	13^{F}	9^{P}	13	13^{F}	10	16^{F}	14	11^{F}	17	13	101.5
3	(France) Simon Gachet (Switzerland) Lucas Légeret	(France) CSA Racing	9^{P}	13	32^{PF}	11^{P}	13	9	7	7	6	28^{PF}	97.5
4	(Italy) Lorenzo Ferrari (Italy) Lorenzo Patrese	(Germany) Tresor Attempto Racing					11^{F}	7	6	4	19	9	75.5
5	(Belgium) Matisse Lismont	(Belgium) Comtoyou Racing	23†	24	28	31	21	30	27	DNS	11^{P}	20	52
6	(United Kingdom) James Jakes	(Belgium) Comtoyou Racing	23†	24	28	31	28	Ret	32	15			42
7	(Republic of Ireland) Charlie Eastwood (Turkey) Salih Yoluç	Racing Team Turkey	21	20^{F}	22	16							32
8	(United Kingdom) David Pittard	(Belgium) Comtoyou Racing					21	30	27	DNS	11^{P}	20	26.5
9	(Denmark) Sebastian Øgaard	(Belgium) Comtoyou Racing							32	15			12
10	(Romania) Petru Umbrărescu	(Belgium) Comtoyou Racing					28	Ret			WD	WD	4.5
Pos.	Drivers	Team	BRH (United Kingdom)		MIS (Italy)		HOC (Germany)		MAG (France)		CAT (Spain)		Points

==== Silver Cup ====
Pos.	Drivers	Team	BRH (United Kingdom)		MIS (Italy)		HOC (Germany)		MAG (France)		CAT (Spain)		Points
1	(Australia) Calan Williams	(Belgium) Team WRT	8^{P}	15	6^{PF}	10^{F}	5	5^{F}	22	14	15	14	112.5
2	(United Kingdom) Sam De Haan	(Belgium) Team WRT	8^{P}	15	6^{PF}	10^{F}	5	5^{F}	22	14			100.5
3	(France) César Gazeau (France) Aurélien Panis	(Belgium) Boutsen VDS	6	12	30	32	16	12	11	12^{F}	5^{PF}	11	97
4	(Italy) Eliseo Donno (United Kingdom) Tom Fleming	(Italy) AF Corse	10	11^{PF}	WD	WD	4^{PF}	21^{P}	17^{F}	8	14	24	80
5	(Singapore) Sean Hudspeth (Belgium) Jef Machiels	(Italy) AF Corse	12	18	18	18	18	20	23	28	20	19^{F}	67
6	(Ukraine) Ivan Klymenko	(France) Saintéloc Racing	16	22	31	14^{P}	14	28	16	Ret^{P}	12	17	57
7	(Republic of Ireland) Reece Barr	(United States) Winward Racing	18	19	24	22	22	26			Ret	WD	36.5
7	(Norway) Magnus Gustavsen	(United States) Winward Racing	18	19	24	22	22	26					36.5
8	(Netherlands) Dante Rappange	(Belgium) Comtoyou Racing	20^{F}	21	27	19	29	29	25	DNS	Ret	18	36
9	(Argentina) Ezequiel Pérez Companc	(Argentina) Madpanda Motorsport							8^{P}	18			32.5
9	(Argentina) Ezequiel Pérez Companc	(France) Saintéloc Racing									12	17	32.5
10	(Norway) Marcus Påverud	(Monaco) Eurodent GSM Team	22	23									28.5
10	(Norway) Marcus Påverud	(France) Saintéloc Racing					14	28	16	Ret^{P}			28.5
11	(Belgium) Lorens Lecertua	(Belgium) Comtoyou Racing			27	19	29	29	25	DNS	Ret	18	28.5
12	(Germany) Tom Kalender	(Argentina) Madpanda Motorsport							8^{P}	18			25
13	(Belgium) Gilles Stadsbader	(France) Saintéloc Racing			31	14^{P}							16
13	(Belgium) Gilles Stadsbader	(United States) Winward Racing									Ret	WD	16
14	(Indonesia) Sean Gelael	(Belgium) Team WRT									15	14	12
15	(Italy) Marco Butti (Italy) Pietro Delli Guanti	(Monaco) Eurodent GSM Team			25	29							12
16	(Poland) Karol Basz (Austria) Simon Reicher	(Austria) Eastalent Racing									13	15^{P}	10.5
17	(United Kingdom) Hugo Cook	(France) Saintéloc Racing	16	22									9
18	(United Kingdom) Charles Clark	(Belgium) Comtoyou Racing	20^{F}	21									7.5
–	(United Kingdom) James Kell	(Monaco) Eurodent GSM Team	WD	WD									0
Pos.	Drivers	Team	BRH (United Kingdom)		MIS (Italy)		HOC (Germany)		MAG (France)		CAT (Spain)		Points

==== Bronze Cup ====
Pos.	Drivers	Team	MIS (Italy)		HOC (Germany)		MAG (France)		CAT (Spain)		Points
1	(United Kingdom) Dan Harper (United Kingdom) Darren Leung	(United Kingdom) Century Motorsport	17	20	15	11^{F}	21^{P}	26^{F}	21	22	74.5
2	(United Kingdom) Rob Collard (United Kingdom) Sandy Mitchell	(United Kingdom) Barwell Motorsport	19	24	19	15	18	25	22^{F}	21	67.5
3	(United States) Dustin Blattner (Germany) Dennis Marschall	(Germany) Rutronik Racing	DNS	23	27^{F}	19	20^{F}	17	23	16^{PF}	61.5
4	(Italy) Eddie Cheever III (Hong Kong) Jonathan Hui	(United Kingdom) Sky – Tempesta Racing	20	17^{P}	20	17	28	22	26	23	60.5
5	Andrey Mukovoz (Luxembourg) Dylan Pereira	(Germany) Tresor Attempto Racing	16	27	24	18	26	23	Ret	25	44
6	(Kyrgyzstan) Dmitry Gvazava (Belgium) Ugo de Wilde	(Italy) Imperiale Racing	15	21	23	25	24	27	Ret	27	42.5
7	(Monaco) Louis Prette	(United Kingdom) Garage 59	23	25	Ret^{P}	27^{P}	30†	20^{P}	18	Ret	25.5
8	(France) Stéphane Denoual (France) Steven Palette	(France) Schumacher CLRT	29	Ret	26	24	31†	21	25	26	22
9	(Finland) Patrick Kujala (Luxembourg) Gabriel Rindone	(United Kingdom) Barwell Motorsport	26	28	25	23	29	24	22^{P}	Ret	21.5
10	(Germany) Marvin Dienst (Austria) Philipp Sager	(Italy) Dinamic GT	14^{PF}	30^{F}							18.5
11	(Portugal) Miguel Ramos	(United Kingdom) Garage 59			Ret^{P}	27^{P}	30†	20^{P}	18	Ret	18
12	(United Kingdom) James Cottingham	(United Kingdom) Garage 59	23	25							7.5
Pos.	Drivers	Team	MIS (Italy)		HOC (Germany)		MAG (France)		CAT (Spain)		Points

== See also ==
- 2024 British GT Championship
- 2024 GT World Challenge Europe
- 2024 GT World Challenge Europe Endurance Cup
- 2024 GT World Challenge Asia
- 2024 GT World Challenge America
- 2024 GT World Challenge Australia
- 2024 Intercontinental GT Challenge
