= César Gazeau =

French racing driver (born 2004)

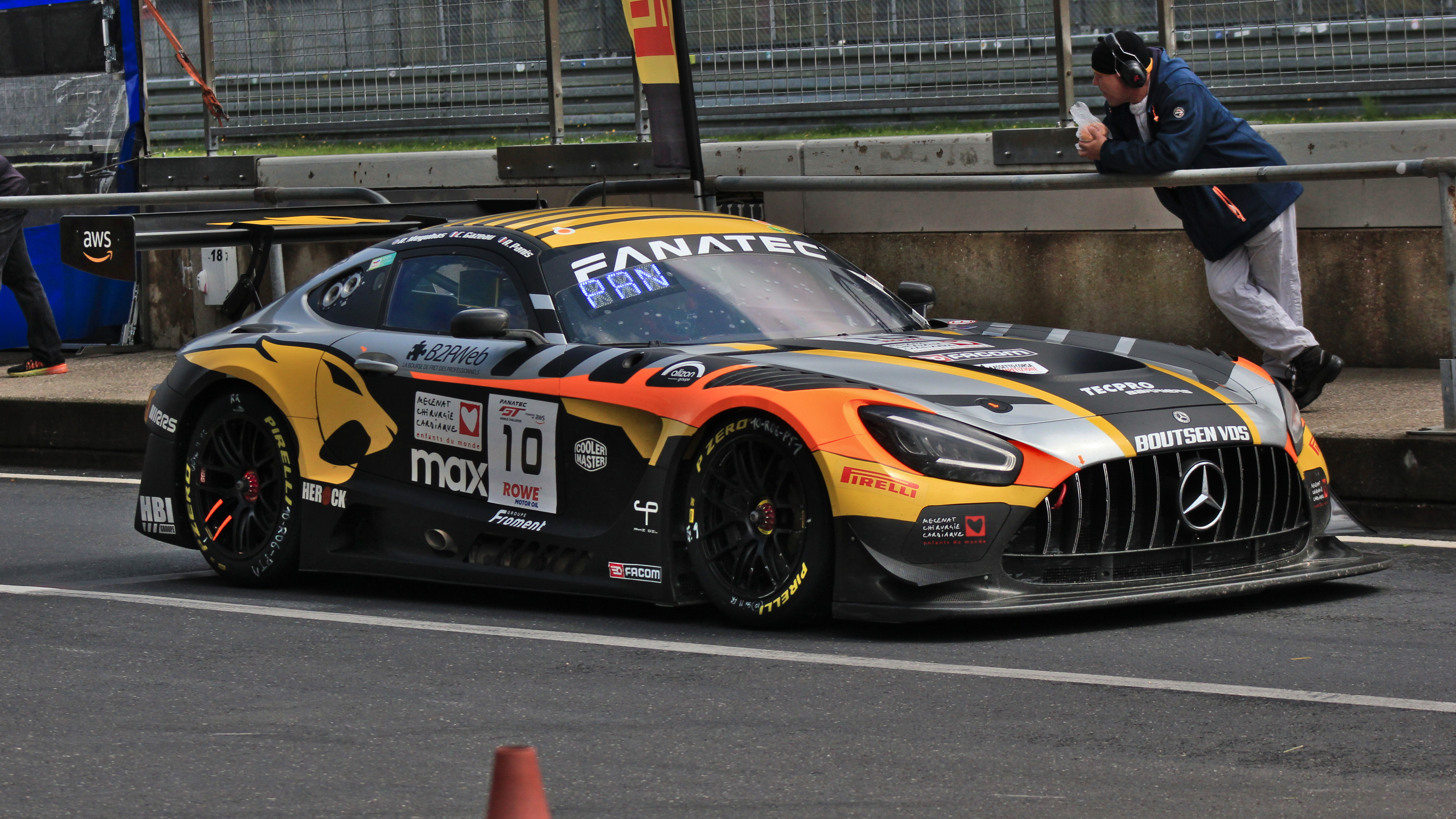
- Gazeau in 2024
- Nationality: (France) French
- Born: 17 January 2004 (age 22) Chaudron-en-Mauges, France
- Categorisation: FIA Silver

Championship titles
- 2020: French GT4 Cup – Am

César Gazeau (born 17 January 2004) is a French racing driver who last competed for GetSpeed Team Bartone Bros in the GT World Challenge Europe Endurance Cup.

== Career ==
Gazeau began karting in 2012, finishing third in the Mini Kart standings of the Championnat Régional Bretagne-Pays de la Loire. Racing in mini karts until 2016, Gazeau most notably finished third in the 2015 Kart Racing Academy standings, before securing runner-up honours in the following year's Championnat de France points. Two years in junior karts then ensued, in which he most notably was runner-up in the 2017 Challenge Rotax Max France and the 2018 Championnat de France. In 2019, Gazeau stepped up to senior karts, a year headlined by finishing second in the RMC International Trophy, as well as taking third in the Rotax Max Euro Trophy and National Series Karting standings.

Stepping up to cars in 2020, Gazeau joined Toyota-fielding CMR to compete in the Am class of the French GT4 Cup. In his only season in the series, Gazeau scored five class wins and three other podiums to secure the Am title alongside Wilfried Cazalbon. Remaining in GT4 competition for 2021, Gazeau switched to the European series, as he partnered up with Konstantin Lachenauer to drive AGS Events' Aston Martin Vantage AMR GT4. Racing in the Silver Cup, Gazeau took a lone win in race one at Zandvoort to end the year ninth in the class standings.

Moving to GT3s in 2022, Gazeau joined the Saintéloc Junior Team to compete in the GT World Challenge Europe Endurance Cup, as he shared an Audi R8 LMS Evo II with Nicolas Baert and Aurélien Panis. In the five-race season, Gazeau took a best overall result of 12th at the Hockenheimring and ended the year fifth in the Silver Cup standings. Continuing with Audi machinery in 2023, Gazeau switched to Boutsen VDS for a dual campaign in the GT World Challenge Europe Endurance and Sprint Cups. Between the two campaigns, Gazeau found more success in the Sprint Cup, taking a Gold Cup win at Zandvoort and five more podiums to end the year fourth in points alongside Adam Eteki.

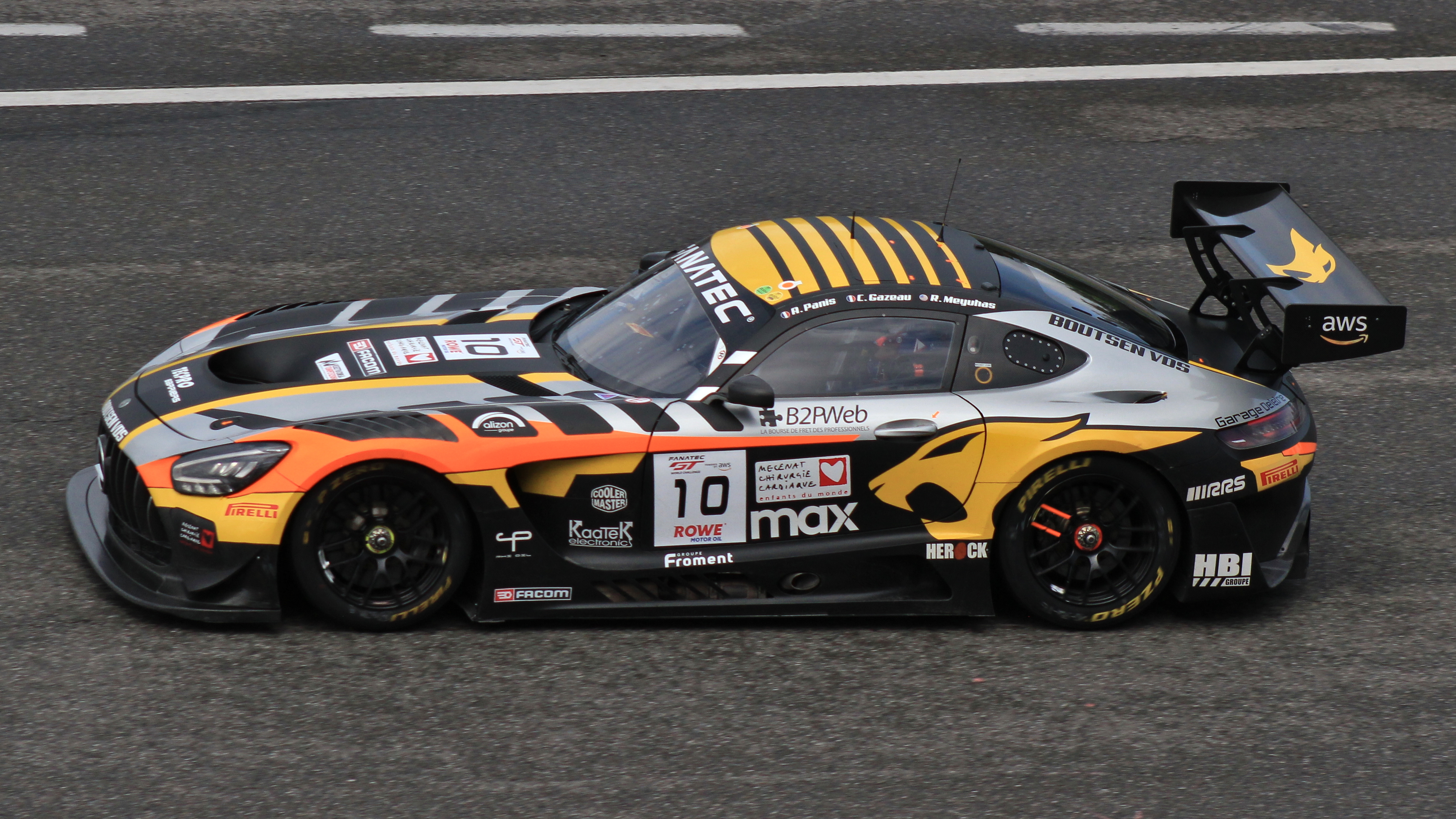
Gazeau's Boutsen VDS Mercedes at the Nürburgring in 2024.

In 2024, Gazeau remained with the team for another dual campaign in GTWC Europe, as the team switched to the Mercedes-AMG GT3 Evo. Racing alongside Panis and Roee Meyuhas for the full Endurance Cup season, Gazeau scored a lone class win at the Nürburgring and a podium at Jeddah to end the season third in the Silver Cup points. In the Sprint Cup, also partnering Panis, Gazeau took class wins at Brands Hatch and both Barcelona races en route to a third-place points finish among the Silvers. Staying with Boutsen VDS for a third dual campaign in 2025, Gazeau and Panis took a pair of class wins at Brands Hatch and Valencia, as well as five other podiums to secure runner-up honours in the Sprint Cup's Silver standings. The pair were joined by Loris Cabirou for the Endurance Cup, in which they took class wins at Monza and at the Nürburgring to also end the season runners-up in the Silver Cup standings.

In 2026, Gazeau switched to Mercedes-affiliated GetSpeed Team Bartone Bros to compete in the GT World Challenge Europe Endurance Cup alongside Panis and Anthony Bartone. At the 24 Hours of Spa, Gazeau set the overall fastest time in Q3 and was the fastest Silver Cup entrant in Superpole, before scoring class podiums at the Nürburgring and Algarve to move up to fourth in points. Towards the end of the year, Gazeau competed in the final two rounds of International GT Open with Team Motopark alongside Nikita Mazepin, in which he took a best result of fifth at Monza.

== Karting record ==
=== Karting career summary ===
Season	Series	Team	Position
2012	Championnat Regional Bretagne-Pays de la Loire — Mini Kart		3rd
2012	Coupe de France — Mini Kart		17th
2012	Trophée Kart Mag — Mini Kart		10th
2013	Championnat Regional Bretagne-Pays de la Loire — Mini Kart		8th
2013	Coupe de France — Mini Kart		31st
2014	National Series Karting — KRA 7-11		13th
2015	Kart Racing Academy — KRA 9-12		3rd
2015	National Series Karting — Minime	LMC	21st
2015	Coupe de France — Minime	LMC 44	8th
2016	National Series Karting — Minime	RM Concept	4th
2016	Championnat de France — Minime	RM Concept	2nd
2016	Coupe de France — Minime	RM Concept	8th
2017	Rotax Winter Cup — Junior Max	Riche	24th
2017	National Series Karting — Nationale	RM Concept	10th
2017	Challenge Rotax Max France — Nationale	RM Concept	2nd
2017	Coupe de France — Nationale	RM Concept	13th
2017	Championnat de France — National	RM Concept	11th
2017	IAME International Final — X30 Junior	SG Drivers	34th
2018	National Series Karting — Nationale	RM Concept	5th
2018	IAME Euro Series — X30 Junior	RM Concept	
2018	Championnat de France — Nationale	RM Concept	2nd
2018	Coupe de France — Nationale	RM Concept	5th
2018	Challenge Rotax Max France — Nationale	RM Concept	3rd
2018	IAME International Final — X30 Junior	RM Concept	25th
2018	RMC Grand Finals — Junior Max	Richard Gazeau	14th
2019	National Series Karting — Rotax Max	RM Concept	3rd
2019	Rotax Max Euro Trophy — Senior Max	Daems Racing Team	3rd
2019	RMC International Trophy — Senior Max	Richard Gazeau	2nd
2019	RMC Grand Finals — Senior Max	Richard Gazeau	14th

== Racing record ==
=== Racing career summary ===
Season	Series	Team	Races	Wins	Poles	F/Laps	Podiums	Points	Position
2020	French GT4 Cup – Am	CMR	10	5	2	1	8	197	**1st**
2021	GT4 European Series – Silver	AGS Events	12	1	0	0	1	69	9th
2022	GT World Challenge Europe Endurance Cup	Saintéloc Junior Team	5	0	0	0	0	0	NC
2022	GT World Challenge Europe Endurance Cup – Silver	Saintéloc Junior Team	5	0	0	0	0	43	5th
2023	GT World Challenge Europe Endurance Cup	Boutsen VDS	5	0	0	0	0	0	NC
2023	GT World Challenge Europe Endurance Cup – Silver	Boutsen VDS	5	0	0	0	0	39	7th
2023	GT World Challenge Europe Sprint Cup	Boutsen VDS	10	0	0	0	0	4.5	19th
2023	GT World Challenge Europe Sprint Cup – Gold	Boutsen VDS	10	1	0	1	6	93	4th
2024	GT World Challenge Europe Endurance Cup	Boutsen VDS	5	0	0	0	0	0	NC
2024	GT World Challenge Europe Endurance Cup – Silver	Boutsen VDS	5	1	0	0	3	81	**3rd**
2024	GT World Challenge Europe Sprint Cup	Boutsen VDS	10	0	0	0	0	4.5	16th
2024	GT World Challenge Europe Sprint Cup – Silver	Boutsen VDS	10	3	0	0	7	97	**3rd**
2024	Intercontinental GT Challenge	Boutsen VDS	1	0	0	0	0	0	NC
2025	GT World Challenge Europe Endurance Cup	Boutsen VDS	5	0	0	0	0	2	26th
2025	GT World Challenge Europe Endurance Cup – Silver	Boutsen VDS	5	2	0	0	2	77	**2nd**
2025	GT World Challenge Europe Sprint Cup	Boutsen VDS	10	0	0	0	0	8.5	17th
2025	GT World Challenge Europe Sprint Cup – Silver	Boutsen VDS	10	2	0	0	7	96	**2nd**
2025	Intercontinental GT Challenge	Boutsen VDS	1	0	0	0	0	0	NC
2026	GT World Challenge Europe Endurance Cup	GetSpeed Team Bartone Bros	5	0	0	0	0	4	30th
2026	GT World Challenge Europe Endurance Cup – Silver	GetSpeed Team Bartone Bros	5	0	1	0	2	58	4th
2026	Intercontinental GT Challenge	GetSpeed Team Bartone Bros	1	0	0	0	0	0	NC
2026	24H Series – GT3 Pro-Am	GetSpeed Team PCX Racing	1	0	1	0	1	44	13th
2026	International GT Open	Team Motopark	3	0	0	0	0	14	24th

* Season still in progress.

^{†} As Gazeau was a guest driver, he was ineligible for points.

=== Complete French GT4 Cup results ===
(key) (Races in bold indicate pole position) (Races in italics indicate fastest lap)

Year	Team	Car	Class	1	2	3	4	5	6	7	8	9	10	11	12	Pos.	Points
2020	CMR	Toyota GR Supra GT4	Am	NOG; 1; 27	NOG; 2; 15	NOG; 3; 17	MAG; 1; 20	MAG; 2 Ret	LEC; 1; 13	LEC; 2; 13	LEC; 3; 22	ALB; 1; 22	ALB; 2; 14	LEC; 1; 17	LEC; 2; 12	1st	197

=== Complete GT4 European Series results ===
(key) (Races in bold indicate pole position) (Races in italics indicate fastest lap)

Year	Team	Car	Class	1	2	3	4	5	6	7	8	9	10	11	12	Pos	Points
2021	AGS Events	Aston Martin Vantage AMR GT4	Silver	MNZ; 1; 25	MNZ; 2; 7	LEC; 1; 8	LEC; 2; 7	ZAN; 1; 1	ZAN; 2; 13	SPA; 1 Ret	SPA; 2; 17	NÜR; 1; 16	NÜR; 2; 19	CAT; 1 Ret	CAT; 2; 8	9th	69

=== Complete GT World Challenge Europe results ===
==== GT World Challenge Europe Endurance Cup ====
(key) (Races in bold indicate pole position) (Races in italics indicate fastest lap)

Year	Team	Car	Class	1	2	3	4	5	6	7	Pos.	Points
2022	Saintéloc Junior Team	Audi R8 LMS Evo II	Silver	IMO; 21	LEC; 20	SPA; 6H; Ret	SPA; 12H; Ret	SPA; 24H; Ret	HOC; 12	CAT; 16	5th	43
2023	Boutsen VDS	Audi R8 LMS Evo II	Silver	MNZ; 33	LEC; 21	SPA; 6H; 41	SPA; 12H; 63	SPA; 24H; Ret	NÜR; 38	CAT; Ret	7th	39
2024	Boutsen VDS	Mercedes-AMG GT3 Evo	Silver	LEC; 21	SPA; 6H; 27	SPA; 12H; 32	SPA; 24H; 40	**NÜR**; 16	MNZ; Ret	JED; 15	3rd	81
2025	Boutsen VDS	Mercedes-AMG GT3 Evo	Silver	LEC; 40	MNZ; 26	SPA; 6H; 18	SPA; 12H; 18	SPA; 24H; 27	NÜR; 9	CAT; 19	2nd	77
2026	GetSpeed Team Bartone Bros	Mercedes-AMG GT3 Evo	Silver	LEC; 33	MNZ; 13	SPA; 6H; 33	SPA; 12H; 26	**SPA**; **24H**; 28	NÜR; 20	ALG; 8	4th	58

==== GT World Challenge Europe Sprint Cup ====
(key) (Races in bold indicate pole position) (Races in italics indicate fastest lap)

Year	Team	Car	Class	1	2	3	4	5	6	7	8	9	10	Pos.	Points
2023	Boutsen VDS	Audi R8 LMS Evo II	Gold	BRH; 1; 12	BRH; 2; 28†	MIS; 1; 14	MIS; 2; 17	HOC; 1; 6	HOC; 2; 19	VAL; 1; 36†	VAL; 2; 24	ZAN; 1; 11	ZAN; 2; 26†	4th	93
2024	Boutsen VDS	Mercedes-AMG GT3 Evo	Silver	BRH; 1; 6	BRH; 2; 12	MIS; 1; 30	MIS; 2; 32†	HOC; 1; 16	HOC; 2; 12	MAG; 1; 11	MAG; 2; 12	**CAT**; **1**; 5	CAT; 2; 11	3rd	97
2025	Boutsen VDS	Mercedes-AMG GT3 Evo	Silver	BRH; 1; 13	**BRH**; **2**; 10	ZAN; 1; 13	ZAN; 2; 12	MIS; 1 Ret	MIS; 2; 10	MAG; 1; 14	MAG; 2; 12	VAL; 1 Ret	**VAL**; **2**; 4	2nd	96
