= Tom Kalender =

German racing driver (born 2008)

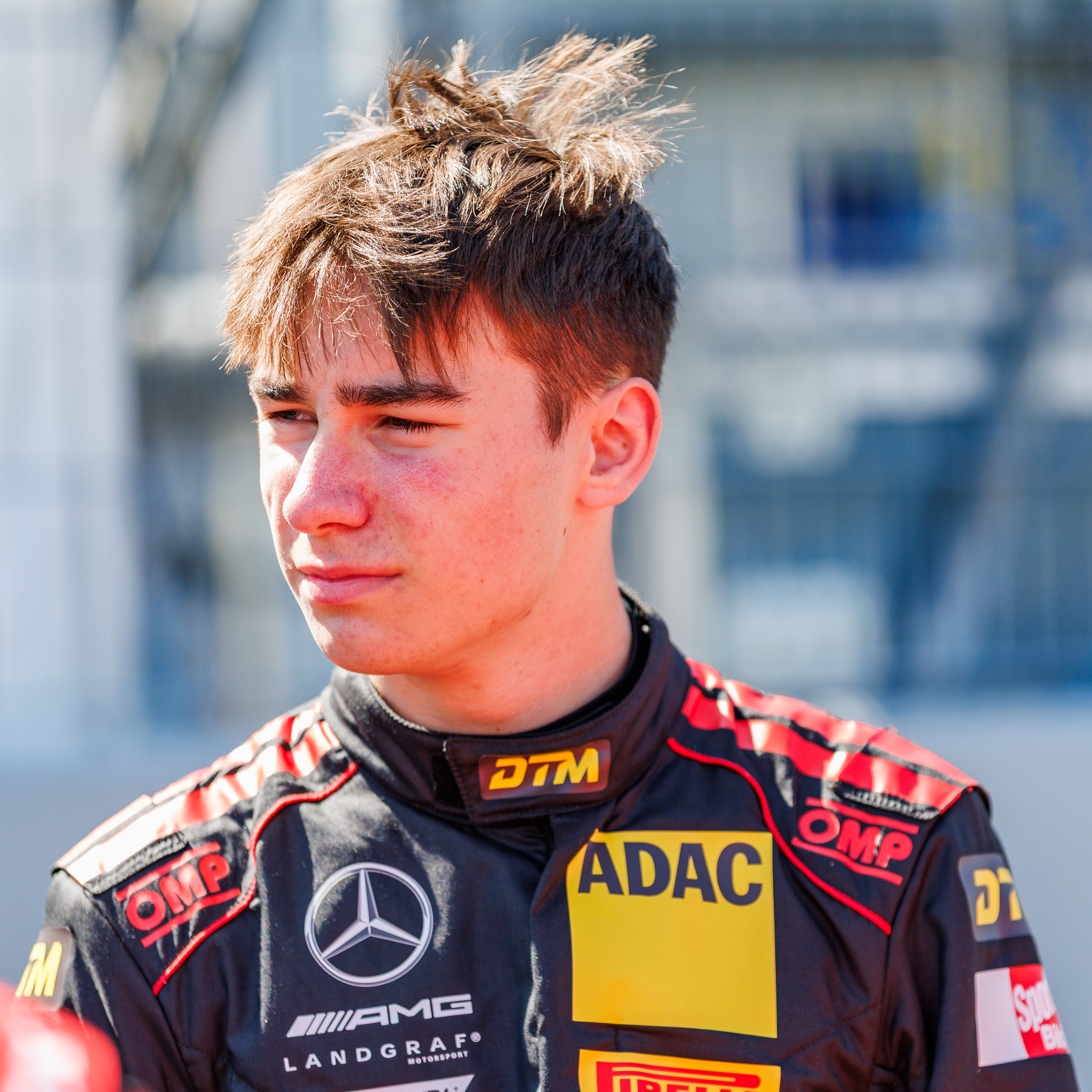
- Kalender in 2025
- Nationality: (Germany) German
- Born: 27 March 2008 (age 18) Hamm, Germany
- Categorisation: FIA Silver

Championship titles
- 2024: ADAC GT Masters

Tom Kalender (born 27 March 2008 in Hamm) is a German racing driver who last competed in DTM for Landgraf Motorsport and the GT World Challenge Europe Endurance Cup for GetSpeed. He is a Mercedes-AMG junior, an ADAC GT Masters champion and the youngest driver in DTM history.

== Early career ==
=== Formula 4 ===
At the start of 2023, Kalender was named as one of three drivers in ADAC's Formula Junior Team. A few months later, it was announced that Kalender would race in the 2023 French F4 Championship. In the first round of the season at Nogaro, he finished 12th on debut, feeling "a little disappointed" as he missed out on reverse-grid pole for race two. In race two he gained one position to finish 11th, but his promising form ended in race three where he retired following a collision. Following a difficult weekend at Magny-Cours where he was only able to finish 13th in race three, Kalender scored his first points of the season at Pau by finishing seventh and eighth in the final two races of the weekend. The following round at Spa-Francorchamps proved to be Kalender's best weekend of the season, as he finished fifth and seventh in races one and three, respectively.

At Misano, Kalender finished 16th in race one with a broken front wing, and after a retirement in race two, finished 12th in race three. In the penultimate round of the season at Lédenon, started on a promising note, with Kalender running as high as eighth and finishing tenth in race one. After missing out on points in race two, owing to a setup change going "the wrong direction", Kalender ran as high as seventh in race three but was forced into retirement after contact with Jason Leung on the penultimate lap. After a difficult final round of the season at Paul Ricard, Kalender made a one-off appearance in the Italian F4 Championship in the final round of the season at Vallelunga.

== GT racing ==
=== 2024 ===
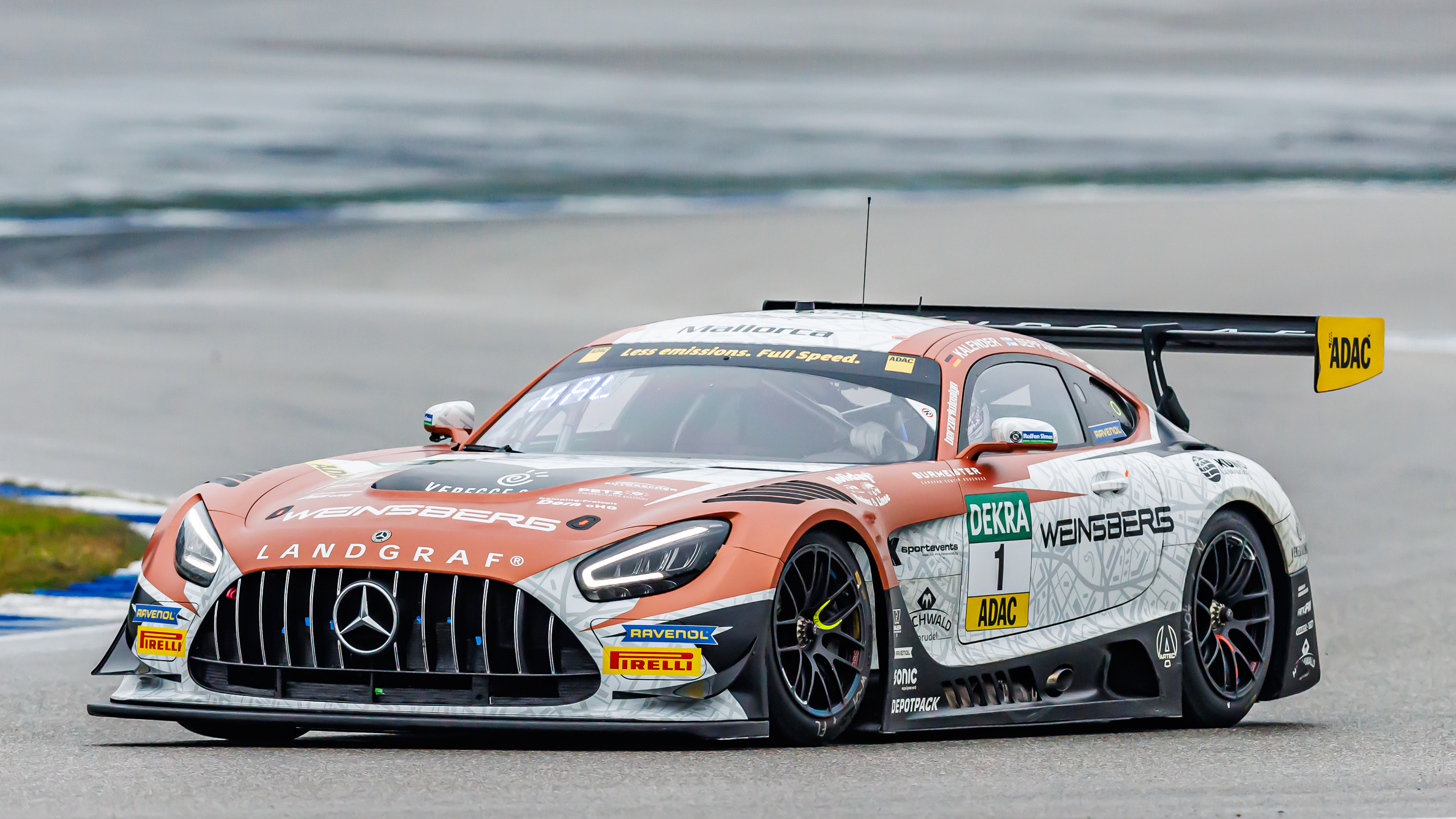
Kalender's title-winning Mercedes at the Hockenheimring round of the 2024 ADAC GT Masters season

Kalender retained ADAC support for 2024 but switched to ADAC GT Masters, partnering Elias Seppänen at Landgraf Motorsport. Finishing runner-up on his series debut at Oschersleben, Kalender then missed out on race two pole by 0.031 seconds but rebounded to take his first win of the season. In the following round at Zandvoort, Kalender extended his points lead by winning race one from pole position. Missing out on race one pole by 0.076 seconds at the Nürburgring, Kalender initially fell to seventh, but as Elias Seppänen got in the car, he was able to gain five positions and finish second. In race two, Kalender was fighting for the podium but a late-race collision sent him back to sixth. In the following round at Spa-Francorchamps, Kalender won from pole position in race one, and initially won race two, but were classified sixth after being given a penalty. At the Red Bull Ring, Kalender finished third in race one after having started 11th, while in race two he was able to maintain the lead of the race until the end to take his fourth win of the season.

In the final round of the season at the Hockenheimring, Kalender finished third in race one to win the ADAC GT Masters title with a race to spare. In the season finale, Kalender overtook Alexander Schwarzer at the hairpin following a safety car restart, to take his fifth win of the season. He became the youngest champion in ADAC GT Masters history at sixteen years, six months and 23 days old. Kalender also made one-off appearances for Madpanda Motorsport in both the GT World Challenge Europe Endurance Cup and the GT World Challenge Europe Sprint Cup.

=== 2025 ===
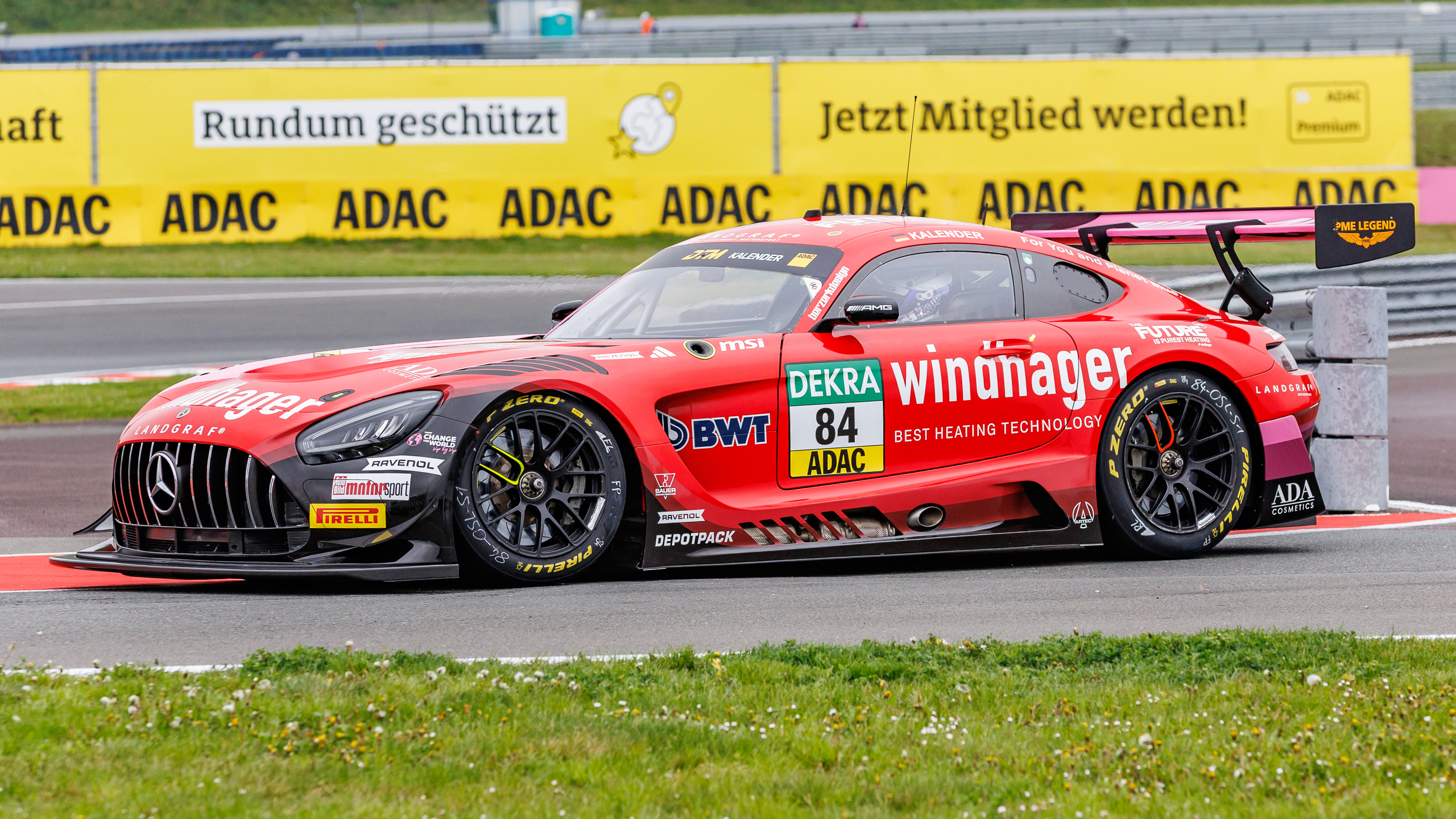
Kalender at Motorsport Arena Oschersleben in 2025

On February 12, it was announced that Kalender would step up to DTM with Landgraf Motorsport, alongside Lucas Auer, in his first year as a Mercedes-AMG junior driver. He became the youngest ever DTM starter at seventeen years and 30 days old. In his rookie year in DTM, Kalender scored his first points in race two at the Lausitzring by finishing 15th, before scoring points in all but six races to end the year 21st in points with a best result of fifth at the Hockenheimring. During 2025, Kalender also made one-off appearances in the ST-X class of the Super Taikyu Series for Craft-Bamboo Racing, and the Silver Cup of the GT World Challenge Europe Endurance Cup for GetSpeed. At the end of the year, Kalender finished second in the Indianapolis 8 Hour for Mercedes-AMG Team GMR.

=== 2026 ===
Kalender was retained as a Mercedes-AMG junior driver for 2026, as he remained with Landgraf Motorsport for his sophomore year in DTM and a campaign in the GT World Challenge Europe Endurance Cup for GetSpeed. In his second year in DTM, Kalender became the series' youngest-ever podium scorer at the Nürburgring, as he ended the year 18th overall while securing the Rookie of the Year award.

== Karting record ==
=== Karting career summary ===
Season	Series	Team	Position
2016	ADAC Kart Bundesendlauf – Bambini Light		2nd
2017	ADAC Kart Bundesendlauf – Bambini Light	DS Kartsport	2nd
2018	ADAC Kart Bundesendlauf – Bambini	DS Kartsport	2nd
2018	ADAC Kart Masters – Bambini		3rd
2018	IAME International Final – X30 Mini	KR Sport	7th
2019	ADAC Kart Masters – Bambini		1st
2019	ADAC Kart Cup – Bambini	DS Kartsport	2nd
2019	Westdeutscher ADAC Kart Cup – Bambini		1st
2019	IAME Series Benelux – X30 Mini		24th
2019	IAME International Final – X30 Mini		NC
2020	ADAC Kart Masters – OKJ	DS Kartsport / ADAC Mittelrhein e.V.	4th
2021	WSK Champions Cup – OKJ	TB Racing Team	71st
2021	Champions of the Future – OKJ	TB Racing Team	76th
2021	ADAC Kart Masters – OKJ	TB Racing Team	4th
2021	German Kart Championship – OKJ	TB Racing Team	5th
2021	European Karting Championship – OKJ	TB Racing Team	NC
2021	Trofeo delle Industrie – OKJ	TB Racing Team	5th
2021	26° South Garda Winter Cup – OKJ	TB Racing Team	12th
2022	WSK Super Master Series – OKJ	TB Racing Team	31st
2022	German Kart Championship – OKJ	TB Racing Team	2nd
2022	WSK Euro Series – OKJ	TB Racing Team	91st
2022	Karting World Championship – OKJ	TB Racing Team	43rd

== Racing record ==
=== Racing career summary ===
Season	Series	Team	Races	Wins	Poles	F/Laps	Podiums	Points	Position
2023	French F4 Championship	FFSA Academy	21	0	0	0	0	23	16th
2023	Italian F4 Championship	PHM Racing	3	0	0	0	0	0	49th
2024	ADAC GT Masters	Landgraf Motorsport	12	5	0	3	9	253	**1st**
2024	GT World Challenge Europe Endurance Cup	Madpanda Motorsport	1	0	0	0	0	0	NC
2024	GT World Challenge Europe Endurance Cup – Silver	Madpanda Motorsport	1	0	0	0	0	10	20th
2024	GT World Challenge Europe Sprint Cup	Madpanda Motorsport	2	0	0	0	0	2	19th
2024	GT World Challenge Europe Sprint Cup – Silver	Madpanda Motorsport	2	1	1	0	1	25	12th
2025	6 Hours of Portimão	Landgraf Motorsport	1	0	0	0	1	N/A	**2nd**
2025	Deutsche Tourenwagen Masters	Mercedes-AMG Team Landgraf	16	0	0	0	0	25	21st
2025	Super Taikyu - ST-X	Craft-Bamboo Racing	2	0	0	0	0	38.5‡	6th‡
2025	GT World Challenge Europe Endurance Cup	GetSpeed	2	0	0	0	0	0	NC
2025	GT World Challenge Europe Endurance Cup – Silver	GetSpeed	2	0	0	0	1	18	23rd
2025	Intercontinental GT Challenge	GetSpeed; Mercedes-AMG Team GMR	2	0	0	0	1	18	21st
2026	Deutsche Tourenwagen Masters	Mercedes-AMG Team Landgraf	16	0	0	0	1	49	18th
2026	GT World Challenge Europe Endurance Cup	GetSpeed Team Dubai	5	0	0	0	0	0	NC
2026	GT World Challenge Europe Endurance Cup – Bronze	GetSpeed Team Dubai	5	0	0	0	0	17	22nd
2026	Intercontinental GT Challenge	GetSpeed Team Dubai	1	0	0	0	0	0	NC
2026	China GT Championship – GT3	Elegant Racing Team							
2026	Super Taikyu – ST-X	Craft-Bamboo Racing	1	0	0	1	1	113‡	**3rd‡**
2026	Nürburgring Langstrecken-Serie – BMW M240i	SR Motorsport by Schnitzelalm							

‡ Team standings

=== Complete French F4 Championship results ===
(key) (Races in bold indicate pole position; races in italics indicate fastest lap)

Year	1	2	3	4	5	6	7	8	9	10	11	12	13	14	15	16	17	18	19	20	21	DC	Points
2023	NOG; 1; 12	NOG; 2; 11	NOG; 3 Ret	MAG; 1; 19	MAG; 2; 18	MAG; 3; 13	PAU; 1; 11	PAU; 2; 7	PAU; 3; 8	SPA; 1; 5	SPA; 2; 15	SPA; 3; 7	MIS; 1; 16	MIS; 2 Ret	MIS; 3; 12	LÉD; 1; 10	LÉD; 2; 11	LÉD; 3; 18†	LEC; 1; 17	LEC; 2; 12	LEC; 3; 15	16th	23

=== Complete Italian F4 Championship results ===
(key) (Races in bold indicate pole position) (Races in italics indicate fastest lap)

Year	Team	1	2	3	4	5	6	7	8	9	10	11	12	13	14	15	16	17	18	19	20	21	22	DC	Points
2023	PHM Racing	IMO; 1	IMO; 2	IMO; 3	IMO; 4	MIS; 1	MIS; 2	MIS; 3	SPA; 1	SPA; 2	SPA; 3	MNZ; 1	MNZ; 2	MNZ; 3	LEC; 1	LEC; 2	LEC; 3	MUG; 1	MUG; 2	MUG; 3	VLL; 1; 27	VLL; 2 Ret	VLL; 3; 23	49th	0

=== Complete ADAC GT Masters results ===
(key) (Races in bold indicate pole position) (Races in italics indicate fastest lap)

Year	Team	Car	1	2	3	4	5	6	7	8	9	10	11	12	DC	Points
2024	Landgraf Motorsport	Mercedes-AMG GT3 Evo	OSC; 1; 2^{3}	OSC; 2; 1^{2}	**ZAN**; **1**; 1^{1}	ZAN; 2; 8^{3}	NÜR; 1; 2^{2}	NÜR; 2; 6^{3}	SPA; 1; 1^{1}	SPA; 2; 6^{2}	RBR; 1; 3	RBR; 2; 1^{1}	HOC; 1; 3^{1}	HOC; 2; 1^{2}	1st	253

=== Complete GT World Challenge Europe results ===
==== GT World Challenge Europe Endurance Cup ====
(key) (Races in bold indicate pole position) (Races in italics indicate fastest lap)

Year	Team	Car	Class	1	2	3	4	5	6	7	Pos.	Points
2024	Madpanda Motorsport	Mercedes-AMG GT3 Evo	Silver	LEC	SPA; 6H	SPA; 12H	SPA; 24H	NÜR; 32	MNZ	JED	30th	10
2025	GetSpeed	Mercedes-AMG GT3 Evo	Silver	LEC	MNZ	SPA; 6H; 64†	SPA; 12H; 66†	SPA; 24H; Ret	NÜR	CAT; 17	23th	18
2026	GetSpeed Team Dubai	Mercedes-AMG GT3 Evo	Bronze	LEC; 36	MNZ; 31	SPA; 6H; 23	SPA; 12H; 28	SPA; 24H; 47	NÜR; Ret	ALG; 40	22nd	17

==== Complete GT World Challenge Europe Sprint Cup results ====
Year	Team	Car	Class	1	2	3	4	5	6	7	8	9	10	Pos.	Points
2024	Madpanda Motorsport	Mercedes-AMG GT3 Evo	Silver	BRH; 1	BRH; 2	MIS; 1	MIS; 2	HOC; 1	HOC; 2	**MAG**; **1**; 8	MAG; 2; 18	CAT; 1	CAT; 2	12th	25

=== Complete Deutsche Tourenwagen Masters results ===
(key) (Races in bold indicate pole position) (Races in italics indicate fastest lap)

Year	Team	Car	1	2	3	4	5	6	7	8	9	10	11	12	13	14	15	16	Pos	Points
2025	Mercedes-AMG Team Landgraf	Mercedes-AMG GT3 Evo	OSC; 1; 17	OSC; 2; 20	LAU; 1; 16	LAU; 2; 15	ZAN; 1; 17	ZAN; 2; 15	NOR; 1; 13	NOR; 2 Ret	NÜR; 1; 13	NÜR; 2; 17	SAC; 1; 21	SAC; 2 Ret	RBR; 1; 18	RBR; 2; 11	HOC; 1; 15	HOC; 2; 5	21st	25
2026	Mercedes-AMG Team Landgraf	Mercedes-AMG GT3 Evo	RBR; 1; 4	RBR; 2 Ret	ZAN; 1 Ret	ZAN; 2; 15	LAU; 1; 11	LAU; 2 Ret	NOR; 1 Ret	NOR; 2; 14	OSC; 1; 13	OSC; 2; 17	NÜR; 1 Ret	NÜR; 2; 2	SAC; 1; 14	SAC; 2 Ret	HOC; 1; 14	HOC; 2; 15	18th	49
