= Simon Gachet =

French racing driver

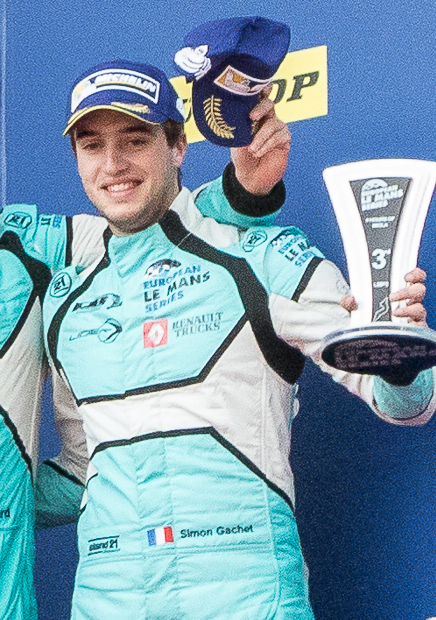
- Gachet in 2016
- Nationality: French
- Born: Simon François Gachet; 14 October 1993 (age 33) Bourgoin-Jallieu, France

GT World Challenge Europe Sprint Cup career
- Debut season: 2017
- Current team: Tresor by Car Collection
- Categorisation: FIA Silver (until 2022); FIA Gold (2023–)
- Car number: 11
- Former teams: Saintéloc Racing
- Starts: 32
- Wins: 3
- Podiums: 13
- Poles: 3

Previous series
- 2020–2021 2020 2017–2021 2016–2017 2013–2015 2013–2015 2012 2011, 2013: Intercontinental GT Challenge; Ultimate Cup Series; GT World Challenge Europe Endurance Cup; European Le Mans Series; Formula Renault 2.0 Alps; Formula Renault Eurocup; French F4 Championship; V de V Challenge Monoplace

Championship titles
- 2020 2011: GT World Challenge Europe Sprint Cup – Silver Cup; V de V Challenge Monoplace
Medal record
GT3
Representing France
FIA Motorsport Games
Gold medal – first place	2022 Le Castellet	GT Cup
- Statistics up to date as of 27 November 2022.

Simon François Gachet (born 14 October 1993) is a French racing driver who currently competes in the GT World Challenge Europe for CSA Racing. Since 2025, Gachet has been employed as a factory driver for McLaren's GT3 program.

== Career ==
=== Early career ===
An avid rugby player as a young boy, Gachet was not heavily involved with motorsports in his youth. He was introduced to motorsport through car magazines, and discovered single-seater racing while attending the Formula Motorsport school at the Circuit du Laquais. In 2011, he began competing in the V de V Challenge Monoplace, completely forgoing the karting process.

=== Junior formulae ===
In his opening season of single-seater competition, Gachet was crowned champion, taking two wins and 11 podiums in 15 races. That winter, Gachet won the Euroformula Volant test, awarding him a €60,000 bursary which allowed him to compete in the French F4 Championship for 2012. Scoring six podiums in 14 races, Gachet finished third in the overall points classification. For 2013, Gachet stepped up to the Formula Renault 2.0 Alps series, joining French team ARTA Engineering. He had a quiet start in his first season in the series, scoring his first points in July at Misano and finishing 14th in the championship. He returned to the team in 2014, adding a full-season effort in the Formula Renault Eurocup to his Alps series commitment. Gachet's second season in the Alps series proved more successful, as he scored a podium in each of his first three races en route to a fifth-place finish in the championship. Prior to the Hungaroring round of the 2014 Eurocup Formula Renault 2.0 season, Gachet joined ART Junior Team. He would finish the Eurocup season in 19th, scoring just ten points. For 2015, he joined Tech 1 Racing for a full-season campaign in the Formula Renault Eurocup, topping the charts in the series' preseason tests at MotorLand Aragón. However, it was another quiet season for Gachet, securing just one podium at Le Mans and finishing 16th overall.

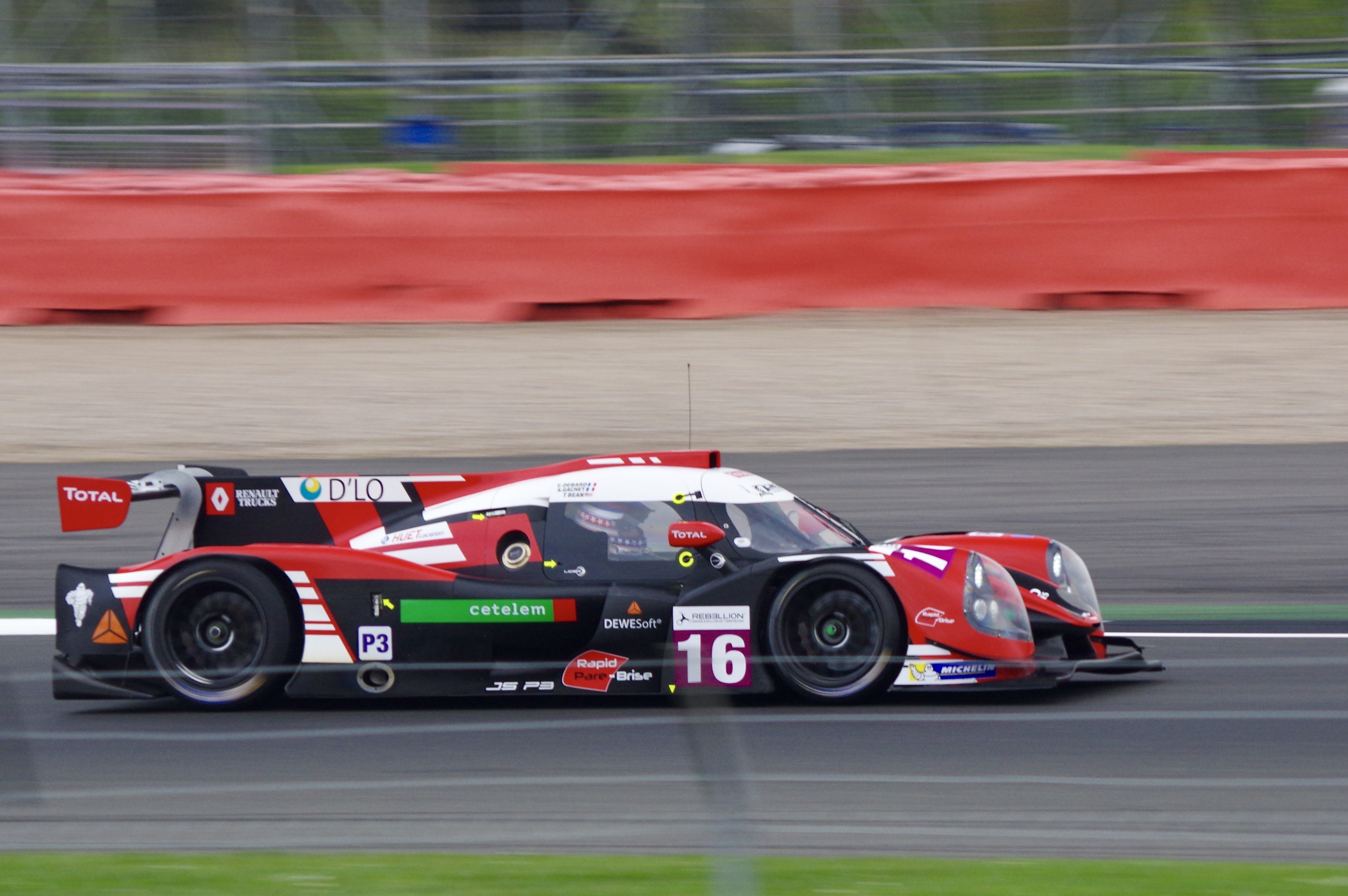
Gachet's Ligier JS P3 at Silverstone in 2017.

=== Sports car racing ===
For 2016, Gachet moved to endurance racing, joining Panis Barthez Competition's entry into the LMP3 class of the European Le Mans Series. The entry scored its first and only podium of the season at Imola, before taking pole position the following week at the Red Bull Ring. Entering five of the six races that season, Gachet and co-drivers Eric Debard and Valentin Moineault finished ninth in the LMP3 class championship. He returned to the team in 2017, finishing 14th in the drivers' championship. Alongside his European Le Mans Series campaign, Gachet joined Energy by ART's entry into the GT4 European Series Southern Cup, taking one podium at Magny-Cours en route to a 20th-place finish in the Pro-Am class championship. Gachet completed 2017 with a pair of one-off appearances for Saintéloc Racing in the GT World Challenge Europe Sprint and Endurance cups, finishing outside of the points in both appearances.

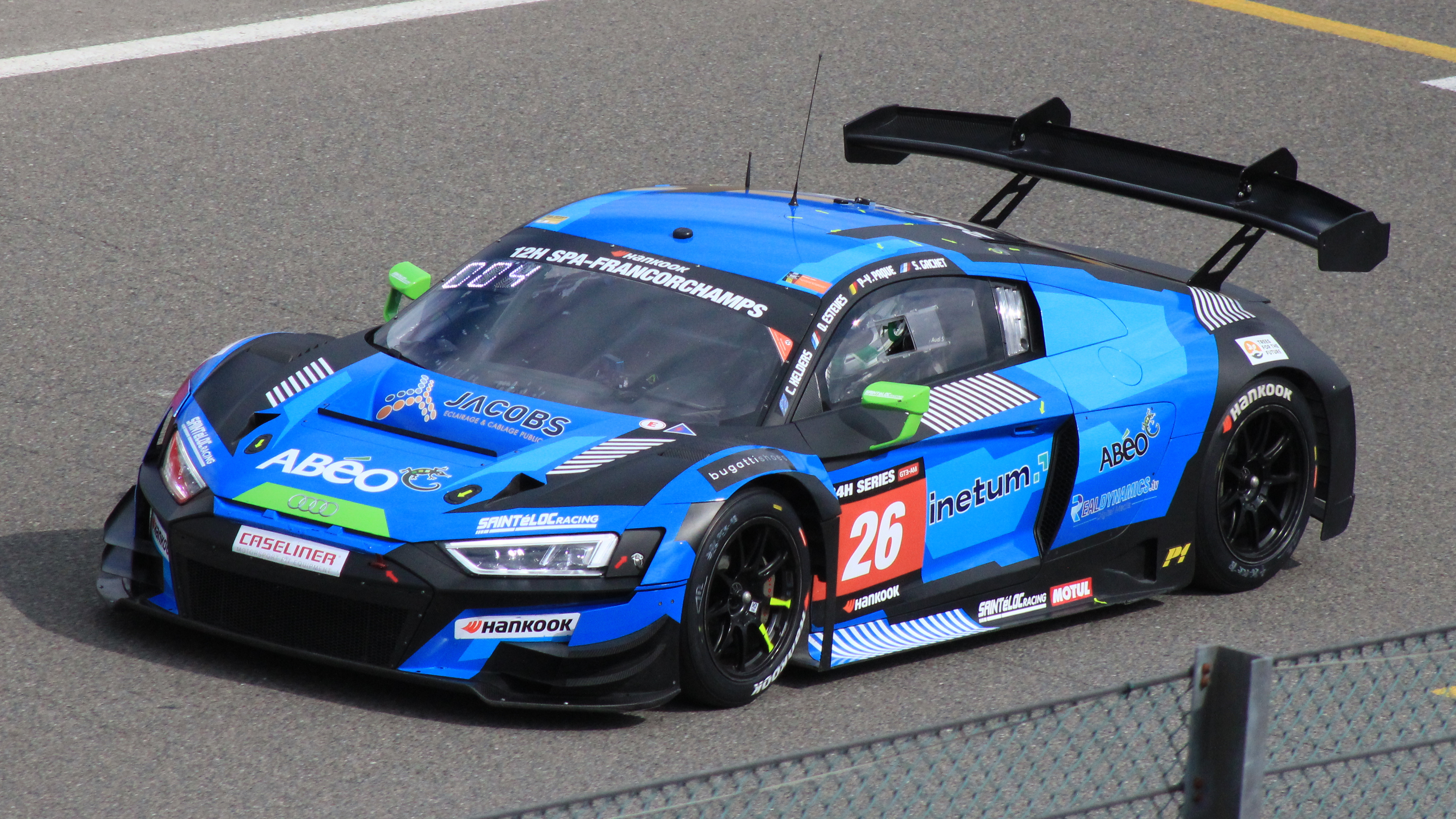
Gachet racing in the 24H Series in 2022

2018 saw Gachet move full-time into the GT World Challenge Europe with Saintéloc. Pairing with Christopher Haase in the Sprint Cup, Gachet scored three overall podiums, including a second-placed finish at Hungaroring, placing eighth in the championship. Gachet began the Endurance Cup season with Saintéloc's Pro entry, scoring a sixth-place finish at Circuit Paul Ricard before joining the team's Am-class entry for the Spa 24 Hours. He would finish 37th in the overall Endurance Cup classification. He returned to the team in both championships for 2019, joining Haase once again in the Sprint Cup and returning to the team's Pro-class entry in the Endurance Cup. Gachet and Haase had their best statistical season to date, finishing fifth in the championship after taking four podiums and Gachet's first win in the series at Zandvoort. He had another quiet season in the Endurance Cup, finishing 33rd overall.

Gachet played a diminished role for the team in 2020, joining Steven Palette in Saintéloc's Silver-class Sprint Cup entry. The duo found immediate success, taking class victory in the opening two races of the season and adding a podium to complete the opening weekend at Misano. The following round at Magny-Cours saw Gachet take the overall pole and victory in race #2, despite being classified in the Silver Cup class. Following the second race at the Circuit de Barcelona-Catalunya, Gachet and Palette clinched the Silver Cup title. The following season saw Gachet switch his focus back to the Endurance Cup, joining Mercedes-AMG entrant AKKA-ASP in their Silver Cup entry. Claiming class victories at Paul Ricard and Barcelona, Gachet finished second in the Silver class championship alongside teammates Konstantin Tereshchenko and Thomas Drouet.

For 2022, Gachet returned to Audi, joining Tresor by Car Collection's Sprint Cup entry. Reunited with Christopher Haase, Gachet scored his first podium of the season at Magny-Cours after taking pole for race #1. He would go on to collect four podium finishes that season, claiming third in the overall championship. Gachet also embarked on full-season campaigns in the FFSA GT Championship and GT4 European Series for Akkodis-ASP. In October, he joined Eric Debard behind the wheel of Team France's GT Relay entry into the 2022 FIA Motorsport Games. The duo finished second in both qualifying races, before scoring the gold medal in the main race.

In 2023, Gachet was promoted to Audi Sport factory driver status. In his first full season as a factory driver, Gachet took on a drive with Saintéloc's Pro class entry in the GT World Challenge Europe Endurance Cup, alongside Patric Niederhauser and Christopher Mies, as well as a Sprint Cup entry in the Gold Cup class, paired with Paul Evrard.

== Racing record ==
=== Career summary ===
Season	Series	Team	Races	Wins	Poles	F/Laps	Podiums	Points	Position
2011	V de V Challenge Monoplace	Formula Motorsport	15	2	1	?	11	525	**1st**
2012	French F4 Championship	Auto Sport Academy	14	0	0	0	6	148	**3rd**
2013	Eurocup Formula Renault 2.0	ARTA Engineering	2	0	0	0	0	0	NC†
2013	Formula Renault 2.0 Alps Series	ARTA Engineering	14	0	0	0	0	28	14th
2013	V de V Challenge Monoplace	Formula Motorsport	3	0	0	0	0	144	19th
2014	Eurocup Formula Renault 2.0	ARTA Engineering	8	0	0	0	0	10	19th
2014	Eurocup Formula Renault 2.0	ART Junior Team	6	0	0	0	0	10	19th
2014	Formula Renault 2.0 Alps Series	ARTA Engineering	14	0	0	0	3	78	5th
2015	Eurocup Formula Renault 2.0	Tech 1 Racing	17	0	0	1	1	19	16th
2015	Formula Renault 2.0 Alps Series	Tech 1 Racing	6	0	0	1	2	0	NC†
2016	European Le Mans Series - LMP3	Panis Barthez Competition	6	0	1	0	1	30.5	9th
2017	Blancpain GT Series Endurance Cup	Saintéloc Racing	1	0	0	0	0	0	NC
2017	Blancpain GT Series Sprint Cup	Saintéloc Racing	2	0	0	0	0	0	NC
2017	European Le Mans Series - LMP3	Panis Barthez Competition	6	0	0	0	0	12.5	14th
2017	GT4 European Series Southern Cup - Pro-Am	Energy by ART	12	0	0	0	1	21	20th
2018	Blancpain GT Series Endurance Cup	Saintéloc Racing	5	0	0	0	0	9	37th
2018	Blancpain GT Series Endurance Cup - Am	Saintéloc Racing	1	0	0	0	0	0	NC
2018	Blancpain GT Series Sprint Cup	Saintéloc Racing	10	0	0	0	3	44.5	8th
2018	French GT4 Cup - Pro-Am	Saintéloc Racing	2	0	0	0	0	0	NC
2019	Blancpain GT Series Endurance Cup	Saintéloc Racing	5	0	0	0	0	2	33rd
2019	Blancpain GT Series Endurance Cup - Pro-Am	Saintéloc Racing	1	0	0	0	0	8	22nd
2019	French GT4 Cup - Pro-Am	Saintéloc Racing	11	0	0	1	1	15	19th
2019	GT4 South European Series - Pro-Am	Saintéloc Racing	2	0	0	0	0	24	6th
2019	24H GT Series - A6	Saintéloc Racing							
2020	GT World Challenge Europe Endurance Cup	Attempto Racing	1	0	0	0	0	0	NC
2020	GT World Challenge Europe Endurance Cup - Silver	Attempto Racing	1	0	0	0	0	0	NC
2020	GT World Challenge Europe Sprint Cup	Saintéloc Racing	10	1	1	0	2	33.5	9th
2020	GT World Challenge Europe Sprint Cup - SIlver	Saintéloc Racing	10	3	2	0	6	108.5	**1st**
2020	French GT4 Cup	Saintéloc Racing	12	0	0	0	2	84	7th
2020	Ultimate Cup Series - Monoplace F3-T318	Formula Motorsport	3	3	?	?	3	168	6th
2021	GT World Challenge Europe Endurance Cup	AKKA ASP Team	5	0	0	0	0	1	32nd
2021	GT World Challenge Europe Endurance Cup - Silver	AKKA ASP Team	5	2	0	0	2	74	**2nd**
2021	French GT4 Cup - Pro-Am	AKKA ASP Team	12	1	0	0	3	98	6th
2021	Intercontinental GT Challenge	Saintéloc Racing	1	0	0	0	0	10	16th
2022	GT World Challenge Europe Sprint Cup	Tresor by Car Collection	10	0	1	0	4	67	**3rd**
2022	French GT4 Cup - Pro-Am	AKKODIS ASP Team	12	0	1	?	2	82	7th
2022	GT4 European Series - Pro-Am	AKKODIS ASP Team	12	0	1	?	2	67	9th
2022	24H GT Series - GT3 Am	Saintéloc Racing	3	0	0	0	0	?	?*
2022	Intercontinental GT Challenge	Saintéloc Junior Team	1	0	0	0	0	0	NC
2022	FIA Motorsport Games GT Cup	Team France	1	1	0	0	1	N/A	**1st**
2022-23	Middle East Trophy - GT3	Saintéloc Racing							
2023	GT World Challenge Europe Endurance Cup	Saintéloc Junior Team	5	0	0	0	0	41	6th
2023	GT World Challenge Europe Sprint Cup	Saintéloc Junior Team	10	0	0	0	0	5.5	18th
2023	GT World Challenge Europe Sprint Cup - Silver	Saintéloc Junior Team	10	1	1	0	5	90	5th
2023	Ultimate Cup Series - Sprint GT Touring Challenge - 3A	Racetivity	4	2	1	2	3	76	5th
2024	GT World Challenge Europe Sprint Cup	CSA Racing	10	0	0	0	0	12.5	14th
2024	GT World Challenge Europe Sprint Cup - Gold	CSA Racing	10	2	4	2	7	97.5	3rd
2024	French GT4 Cup - Pro-Am	Debard Automobiles by Racetivity	4	0	0	1	1	46*	3rd*
2024	Lamborghini Super Trofeo Europe	Schumacher CLRT							
2024	GT World Challenge Europe Endurance Cup	HAAS RT	1	0	0	0	0	0	NC
2024	GT World Challenge Europe Endurance Cup	CSA Racing	1	0	0	0	0	0	NC
2025	GT World Challenge Europe Endurance Cup	CSA Racing	5	0	0	0	0	9	19th
2025	GT World Challenge Europe Sprint Cup	CSA Racing	10	0	0	0	0	3.5	23rd
2026	GT World Challenge Europe Endurance Cup	CSA Racing	5	0	0	0	0	4	30th
2026	GT World Challenge Europe Sprint Cup	CSA Racing	10	0	0	0	0	0.5	30th
2026	Italian GT Championship Endurance Cup - GT3	CSA Racing	3	0	0	0	0	0	NC

† As Gachet was a guest driver, he was ineligible for championship points.
^{*} Season still in progress.

=== Complete French F4 Championship results ===
(key) (Races in bold indicate pole position; races in italics indicate fastest lap)

Year	1	2	3	4	5	6	7	8	9	10	11	12	13	14	DC	Points
2012	LÉD; 1 Ret	LÉD; 2; 2	PAU; 1; 2	PAU; 2; 2	VDV; 1; 4	VDV; 2; 2	MAG; 1; 8	MAG; 2; 3	NAV; 1; 7	NAV; 2; 14	LMS; 1; 7	LMS; 2; 4	LEC; 1; 7	LEC; 2; 3	3rd	148

=== Complete Eurocup Formula Renault 2.0 results ===
(key) (Races in bold indicate pole position) (Races in italics indicate fastest lap)

Year	Entrant	1	2	3	4	5	6	7	8	9	10	11	12	13	14	15	16	17	DC	Points
2013	ARTA Engineering	ALC; 1	ALC; 2	SPA; 1	SPA; 2	MSC; 1	MSC; 2	RBR; 1	RBR; 2	HUN; 1; 19	HUN; 2; 26	LEC; 1	LEC; 2	CAT; 1	CAT; 2				NC†	0
2014	ARTA Engineering	ALC; 1; 9	ALC; 2; 6	SPA; 1; 18	SPA; 2; 15	MSC; 1; 18	MSC; 2 Ret	NÜR; 1; 21	NÜR; 2; 18										19th	10
2014	ART Junior Team									HUN; 1 DSQ	HUN; 2; 19	LEC; 1; 23	LEC; 2; 16	JER; 1; 16	JER; 2; 20				19th	10
2015	Tech 1 Racing	ALC; 1; 9	ALC; 2 Ret	ALC; 3; 19	SPA; 1 Ret	SPA; 2 Ret	HUN; 1; 10	HUN; 2 Ret	SIL; 1; 18	SIL; 2; 15	SIL; 3; 11	NÜR; 1; 14	NÜR; 2; 16	LMS; 1; 11	LMS; 2; 3	JER; 1; 20	JER; 2; 21	JER; 3; 17	16th	19

† As Gachet was a guest driver, he was ineligible for points

=== Complete Formula Renault 2.0 Alps Series results ===
(key) (Races in bold indicate pole position) (Races in italics indicate fastest lap)

Year	Team	1	2	3	4	5	6	7	8	9	10	11	12	13	14	15	16	Pos	Points
2013	ARTA Engineering	VLL; 1; 16	VLL; 2 Ret	IMO1; 1; 24	IMO1; 2 Ret	SPA; 1; 13	SPA; 2; 18	MNZ; 1; 25	MNZ; 2; 13	MIS; 1; 7	MIS; 2; 5	MUG; 1; 13	MUG; 2; 11	IMO2; 1; 5	IMO2; 2 Ret			14th	28
2014	ARTA Engineering	IMO; 1; 3	IMO; 2; 3	PAU; 1; 3	PAU; 2; 8	RBR; 1; 11	RBR; 2; 7	SPA; 1; 23	SPA; 2 Ret	MNZ; 1 Ret	MNZ; 2; 7	MUG; 1; 32	MUG; 2; 18	JER; 1; 16	JER; 2; 11			5th	78
2015	Tech 1 Racing	IMO; 1; 3	IMO; 2 Ret	PAU; 1; 3	PAU; 2; 4	RBR; 1	RBR; 2	RBR; 3	SPA; 1	SPA; 2	MNZ; 1	MNZ; 2	MNZ; 3	MIS; 1	MIS; 2	JER; 1; 9	JER; 2; 7	NC†	0

† As Gachet was a guest driver, he was ineligible for points

=== Complete European Le Mans Series results ===
(key) (Races in bold indicate pole position; results in italics indicate fastest lap)

Year	Entrant	Class	Chassis	Engine	1	2	3	4	5	6	Rank	Points
2016	Panis Barthez Competition	LMP3	Ligier JS P3	Nissan VK50VE 5.0 L V8	SIL; 7	IMO; 3	**RBR**; 8	LEC; 8	SPA	EST; Ret	9th	30.5
2017	Panis Barthez Competition	LMP3	Ligier JS P3	Nissan VK50VE 5.0 L V8	SIL; 9	MNZ; 11	RBR; Ret	LEC; 5	SPA; Ret	ALG; Ret	14th	12.5

=== Complete GT World Challenge Europe results ===
==== GT World Challenge Europe Endurance Cup ====
Year	Team	Car	Class	1	2	3	4	5	6	7	Pos.	Points
2017	Saintéloc Racing	Audi R8 LMS	Pro	MON	SIL	LEC	SPA; 6H	SPA; 12H	SPA; 24H	CAT; 17	NC	0
2018	Saintéloc Racing	Audi R8 LMS	Pro	MON; 14	SIL; Ret	LEC; 6				CAT; 45	37th	9
2018	Saintéloc Racing	Audi R8 LMS	Am				SPA; 6H; 63	SPA; 12H; 63	SPA; 24H; Ret		NC	0
2019	Saintéloc Racing	Audi R8 LMS Evo	Pro	MON; 15	SIL; 11	LEC; 9				CAT; Ret	33rd	2
2019	Saintéloc Racing	Audi R8 LMS Evo	Pro-Am				SPA; 6H; 62	SPA; 12H; 56	SPA; 24H; 48		22nd	8
2020	Attempto Racing	Audi R8 LMS Evo	Silver	IMO	NÜR	SPA; 6H; 56	SPA; 12H; 56	SPA; 24H; Ret	LEC		NC	0
2021	AKKA ASP Team	Mercedes-AMG GT3 Evo	Silver	MON; 11	LEC; 11	SPA; 6H; 40	SPA; 12H; 34	SPA; 24H; 23	NÜR; Ret	CAT; 11	2nd	74
2023	Saintéloc Junior Team	Audi R8 LMS Evo II	Pro	MNZ; 4	LEC; 4	SPA; 6H; 23	SPA; 12H; 24	SPA; 24H; 16	NÜR; 4	CAT; 9	6th	41
2024	HAAS RT	Audi R8 LMS Evo II	Pro	LEC	SPA; 6H; 31	SPA; 12H; 26	SPA; 24H; Ret	NÜR	MNZ		NC	0
2024	CSA Racing	Audi R8 LMS Evo II	Gold							JED; Ret	NC	0
2025	CSA Racing	McLaren 720S GT3 Evo	Gold	LEC; 6	MNZ; Ret	SPA; 6H; 14	SPA; 12H; 13	SPA; 24H; 13	NÜR; 16	CAT; 31	3rd	94
2026	CSA Racing	McLaren 720S GT3 Evo	Gold	LEC; 8	MNZ; 33	SPA; 6H; 21	SPA; 12H; 14	SPA; 24H; 34	NÜR; 27	ALG; 39	4th	72

==== GT World Challenge Europe Sprint Cup ====
Year	Team	Car	Class	1	2	3	4	5	6	7	8	9	10	Pos.	Points
2017	Saintéloc Racing	Audi R8 LMS	Pro	MIS; QR	MIS; CR	BRH; QR	BRH; CR	ZOL; QR	ZOL; CR	HUN; QR	HUN; CR	NÜR; QR; 20	NÜR; CR; 22	NC	0
2018	Saintéloc Racing	Audi R8 LMS	Pro	ZOL; 1; 10	ZOL; 2; 12	BRH; 1; 7	BRH; 2; 8	MIS; 1 Ret	MIS; 2; 3	HUN; 1; 4	HUN; 2; 2	NÜR; 1; 10	NÜR; 2; 3	8th	44.5
2020	Saintéloc Racing	Audi R8 LMS Evo	Silver	MIS; 1; 9	**MIS**; **2**; 9	MIS; 3; 14	**MAG**; **1**; 13	**MAG**; **2**; 1	ZAN; 1; 3	ZAN; 2 Ret	CAT; 1; 19	CAT; 2; 9	CAT; 3; 7	1st	108.5
2022	Tresor by Car Collection	Audi R8 LMS Evo	Pro	BRH; 1; 7	BRH; 2; 4	**MAG**; **1**; 3	MAG; 2 Ret	ZAN; 1; 3	ZAN; 2 Ret	MIS; 1; 4	MIS; 2; 3	VAL; 1; 2	VAL; 2; 4	3rd	67
2023	Saintéloc Junior Team	Audi R8 LMS Evo II	Gold	BRH; 1; 11	BRH; 2; 13	MIS; 1; 19	**MIS**; **2**; 24	HOC; 1; 13	HOC; 2 Ret	VAL; 1; 21	VAL; 2; 6	ZAN; 1; 24	ZAN; 2; 15	5th	90
2024	CSA Racing	Audi R8 LMS Evo II	Gold	**BRH**; **1**; 9	BRH; 2; 13	**MIS**; **1**; 32	**MIS**; **2**; 11	HOC; 1; 13	HOC; 2; 9	MAG; 1; 7	MAG; 2; 7	CAT; 1; 6	**CAT**; **2**; 28	3rd	97.5
2025	CSA Racing	McLaren 720S GT3 Evo	Pro	BRH; 1; 16	BRH; 2; 28	ZAN; 1; 20	ZAN; 2; 17	MIS; 1; 14	MIS; 2; 12	MAG; 1; 10	MAG; 2; 38			28th	0.5
2025	CSA Racing	McLaren 720S GT3 Evo	Gold									VAL; 1; 7	VAL; 2; 26	9th	14
2026	CSA Racing	McLaren 720S GT3 Evo	Gold	BRH; 1; 27	BRH; 2; 10	MIS; 1; 41	MIS; 2; 11	MAG; 1; 30	MAG; 2; 14	ZAN; 1 Ret	ZAN; 2; 24	CAT; 1; 13	CAT; 2; 16	4th	72

^{*} Season still in progress.

Sporting positions
Preceded by Philippe Haezebrouck	V de V Challenge Monoplace; Champion; 2011	Succeeded by Hugo Blanchot
Preceded by Nico Bastian; Thomas Neubauer	GT World Challenge Europe Sprint Cup; Silver Cup Champion; 2019; With: Steven Palette	Succeeded by Alex Fontana
