= 2020 French GT4 Cup =

The 2020 Championnat de France FFSA GT - GT4 France season is the twenty-third season of the French FFSA GT Championship and the third as the French GT4 Cup, a sports car championship created and organised by the Stéphane Ratel Organisation (SRO). The season began on 21 August in Nogaro and ends on 8 November at Lédenon.

== Calendar ==
A 2020 calendar was announced on 29 July 2019 at SRO's annual press conference at the 2019 24 Hours of Spa. However, as a result of the coronavirus crisis SRO had to revise its schedule and an updated calendar was released on 13 May 2020. The season finale at Circuit de Lédenon on 6–8 November was cancelled due to the restrictions caused by COVID-19 pandemic in France and replaced by the competition at Circuit Paul Ricard on 20–22 November.

Round	Circuit	Date
1	Circuit Paul Armagnac, Nogaro, France	21–23 August
2	Circuit de Nevers Magny-Cours, Magny-Cours, France	11–13 September
3	Circuit Paul Ricard, Le Castellet, France	3–4 October
4	Circuit d'Albi, Albi, France	16–18 October
5	Circuit Paul Ricard, Le Castellet, France	20–22 November

== Entry list ==
Team	Car	No.	Drivers	Class	Rounds
(Spain) CD Sport	Mercedes-AMG GT4	2	(France) Edouard Cauhaupé	S	All
(Spain) CD Sport	Mercedes-AMG GT4	2	(France) Fabien Lavergne	S	All
(Spain) CD Sport	Mercedes-AMG GT4	3	(France) Clément Bully	PA	All
(Spain) CD Sport	Mercedes-AMG GT4	3	(France) Jean-Ludovic Foubert	PA	All
(Spain) CD Sport	Mercedes-AMG GT4	4	(Lebanon) Jihad Aboujaoudé	Am	All
(Spain) CD Sport	Mercedes-AMG GT4	4	(Lebanon) Shahan Sarkissian	Am	1–2, 4–5
(France) Team Fullmotorsport	Audi R8 LMS GT4 Evo	5	(France) Christophe Hamon	Am	All
(France) Team Fullmotorsport	Audi R8 LMS GT4 Evo	5	(France) Pascal Huteau	Am	All
(France) Team Fullmotorsport	Audi R8 LMS GT4 Evo	6	(France) Sacha Bottemanne	S	3
(France) Team Fullmotorsport	Audi R8 LMS GT4 Evo	6	(France) Lonni Martins	S	3
(France) Team Fullmotorsport	Audi R8 LMS GT4 Evo	6	(France) Michael Blanchemain	Am	5
(France) Team Fullmotorsport	Audi R8 LMS GT4 Evo	6	(France) Jean-Laurent Navarro	Am	5
(France) AGS Events	Aston Martin Vantage AMR GT4	7	(France) Théo Nouet	S	5
(France) AGS Events	Aston Martin Vantage AMR GT4	7	(France) Valentin Hasse-Clot	S	5
(France) AGS Events	Aston Martin Vantage AMR GT4	10	(France) Julien Lambert	Am	2
(France) AGS Events	Aston Martin Vantage AMR GT4	10	(France) Romano Ricci	Am	2
(France) AGS Events	Aston Martin Vantage AMR GT4	10	(France) Joseph Collado	Am	3
(France) AGS Events	Aston Martin Vantage AMR GT4	10	(Germany) Eric Herr	Am	3
(France) AGS Events	Aston Martin Vantage AMR GT4	69	(France) Gilles Vannelet	PA	All
(France) AGS Events	Aston Martin Vantage AMR GT4	69	(India) Akhil Rabindra	PA	All
(France) AGS Events	Aston Martin Vantage AMR GT4	89	(France) Nicolas Gomar	PA	All
(France) AGS Events	Aston Martin Vantage AMR GT4	89	(France) Mike Parisy	PA	All
(France) AGS Events	Aston Martin Vantage AMR GT4	161	(France) Christophe Carriere	Am	All
(France) AGS Events	Aston Martin Vantage AMR GT4	161	(France) Didier Dumaine	Am	All
(France) Speed Car	Ginetta G55 GT4 (1–2); Alpine A110 GT4 (3–5)	8	(France) Robert Consani	S	All
(France) Speed Car	Ginetta G55 GT4 (1–2); Alpine A110 GT4 (3–5)	8	(France) Benjamin Lariche	S	All
(France) Speed Car	Ginetta G55 GT4	9	(France) Thomas Hodier	PA	1–3
(France) Speed Car	Ginetta G55 GT4	9	(Russia) Dmitry Gvazava	PA	1–3
(France) Speed Car	BMW M4 GT4	48	(France) Sylvain Debs	Am	1
(France) Speed Car	BMW M4 GT4	48	(Russia) Vladimir Charchiyan	Am	1
(France) Saintéloc Racing	Audi R8 LMS GT4 Evo	14	(France) Eric Debard	PA	All
(France) Saintéloc Racing	Audi R8 LMS GT4 Evo	14	(France) Simon Gachet	PA	All
(France) Saintéloc Racing	Audi R8 LMS GT4 Evo	21	(France) Olivier Estèves	PA	All
(France) Saintéloc Racing	Audi R8 LMS GT4 Evo	21	(France) Anthony Beltoise	PA	All
(France) Saintéloc Racing	Audi R8 LMS GT4 Evo	27	(France) Cyril Saleilles	PA	All
(France) Saintéloc Racing	Audi R8 LMS GT4 Evo	27	(France) Adrien Tambay	PA	All
(France) Saintéloc Racing	Audi R8 LMS GT4 Evo	42	(France) Grégory Guilvert	PA	All
(France) Saintéloc Racing	Audi R8 LMS GT4 Evo	42	(France) Fabien Michal	PA	All
(France) Saintéloc Racing	Audi R8 LMS GT4 Evo	44	(France) Jean-Paul Buffin	PA	1, 4–5
(France) Saintéloc Racing	Audi R8 LMS GT4 Evo	44	(France) Pierre Sancinéna	PA	1
(France) Saintéloc Racing	Audi R8 LMS GT4 Evo	44	(France) Arthur Rougier	PA	4–5
(France) Saintéloc Racing	Audi R8 LMS GT4 Evo	44	(France) Jean-Paul Buffin	Am	2–3
(France) Saintéloc Racing	Audi R8 LMS GT4 Evo	44	(France) Michael Blanchemain	Am	2–3
(France) AKKA ASP Team	Mercedes-AMG GT4	16	(France) Fabien Barthez	PA	All
(France) AKKA ASP Team	Mercedes-AMG GT4	16	(France) Vincent Marserou	PA	All
(France) AKKA ASP Team	Mercedes-AMG GT4	53	(France) Christophe Bourret	Am	1–4
(France) AKKA ASP Team	Mercedes-AMG GT4	53	(France) Pascal Gibon	Am	1–4
(France) AKKA ASP Team	Mercedes-AMG GT4	87	(France) Jean-Luc Beaubelique	PA	All
(France) AKKA ASP Team	Mercedes-AMG GT4	87	(France) Jim Pla	PA	All
(France) AKKA ASP Team	Mercedes-AMG GT4	88	(France) Thomas Drouet	S	All
(France) AKKA ASP Team	Mercedes-AMG GT4	88	(France) Paul Petit	S	All
(France) L'Espace Bienvenue	BMW M4 GT4	17	(Netherlands) Ricardo van der Ende	S	All
(France) L'Espace Bienvenue	BMW M4 GT4	17	(Belgium) Benjamin Lessennes	S	All
(Spain) Mirage Racing	Alpine A110 GT4	22	(Switzerland) Philippe Giauque	PA	1–3
(Spain) Mirage Racing	Alpine A110 GT4	22	(France) Morgan Moullin-Traffort	PA	1–3
(Spain) Mirage Racing	Alpine A110 GT4	22	(France) Mateo Herrero	G	4
(Spain) Mirage Racing	Alpine A110 GT4	22	(France) Morgan Moullin-Traffort	G	4
(Spain) Mirage Racing	Alpine A110 GT4	222	(France) Vincent Beltoise	PA	All
(Spain) Mirage Racing	Alpine A110 GT4	222	(France) Rodolphe Wallgren	PA	All
(Spain) Mirage Racing	Alpine A110 GT4	616	(France) Éric Clément	PA	All
(Spain) Mirage Racing	Alpine A110 GT4	616	(France) Romain Iannetta	PA	All
(France) ABM Grand Prix	Ginetta G55 GT4	23	(France) Pierre-André Nicolas	PA	1–2
(France) ABM Grand Prix	Ginetta G55 GT4	23	(France) Emilien Carde	PA	3
(France) ABM Grand Prix	Ginetta G55 GT4	23	(United Kingdom) Ruben Del Sarte	PA	1–3
(France) ABM Grand Prix	Ginetta G55 GT4	23	(United Kingdom) Ruben Del Sarte	G	4–5
(France) CMR	Toyota GR Supra GT4	30	(France) Julien Piguet	S	1–4
(France) CMR	Toyota GR Supra GT4	30	(France) Aurélien Panis	S	All
(France) CMR	Toyota GR Supra GT4	30	(France) Olivier Panis	S	5
(France) CMR	Toyota GR Supra GT4	66	(France) Wilfried Cazalbon	Am	All
(France) CMR	Toyota GR Supra GT4	66	(France) César Gazeau	Am	All
(France) CMR	Alpine A110 GT4	36	(France) Christopher Campbell	PA	All
(France) CMR	Alpine A110 GT4	36	(France) Nicolas Prost	PA	All
(France) CMR	Alpine A110 GT4	60	(France) Andrea Benezet	S	All
(France) CMR	Alpine A110 GT4	60	(France) Paul Evrard	S	All
(France) Arkadia Racing	Ginetta G55 GT4	33	(France) Pierre-Laurent Figuiére	Am	1–4
(France) Arkadia Racing	Ginetta G55 GT4	33	(France) Stephan Guerin	Am	1–4
(France) Bodemer Auto	Alpine A110 GT4	35	(France) Grégoire Demoustier	PA	All
(France) Bodemer Auto	Alpine A110 GT4	35	(France) Alain Ferté	PA	All
(France) Bodemer Auto	Alpine A110 GT4	76	(France) Laurent Coubard	Am	All
(France) Bodemer Auto	Alpine A110 GT4	76	(France) Jean-Charles Rédélé	Am	1–3, 5
(France) IMSA Performance	Porsche 718 Cayman GT4 Clubsport	56	(France) Antoine Heunet	Am	2
(France) Vic'TEAM	Mercedes-AMG GT4	64	(France) Olivier Jouffret	PA	3, 5
(France) Vic'TEAM	Mercedes-AMG GT4	64	(France) Eric Trémoulet	PA	3, 5
(France) ANS Motorsport	Ginetta G55 GT4	72	(France) Sylvain Caroff	Am	All
(France) ANS Motorsport	Ginetta G55 GT4	72	(France) Erwan Bastard	Am	All
(France) GM Sport	Ginetta G55 GT4	99	(France) Guillaume Maio	Am	1
(France) GM Sport	Ginetta G55 GT4	99	(France) Alexandre Ducos	Am	1

Icon	Class
S	Silver Cup
PA	Pro-Am Cup
Am	Am Cup
G	Guest drivers ineligible to score points

== Race results ==
Bold indicates overall winner.

Round		Circuit	Pole position	Silver Winners	Pro-Am Winners	Am Winners
1	R1	(France) Nogaro	(France) No. 17 L'Espace Bienvenue	**(France) No. 17 L'Espace Bienvenue**	(Spain) No. 22 Mirage Racing	(France) No. 5 Team Fullmotorsport
1	R1	(France) Nogaro	(Netherlands) Ricardo van der Ende (Belgium) Benjamin Lessennes	**(Netherlands) Ricardo van der Ende** **(Belgium) Benjamin Lessennes**	(Switzerland) Philippe Giauque (France) Morgan Moullin-Traffort	(France) Christophe Hamon (France) Pascal Huteau
1	R2	(France) Nogaro	(France) No. 87 AKKA-ASP Team	(France) No. 17 L'Espace Bienvenue	**(France) No. 87 AKKA-ASP Team**	(France) No. 66 CMR
1	R2	(France) Nogaro	(France) Jean-Luc Beaubelique (France) Jim Pla	(Netherlands) Ricardo van der Ende (Belgium) Benjamin Lessennes	**(France) Jean-Luc Beaubelique** **(France) Jim Pla**	(France) Wilfried Cazalbon (France) César Gazeau
1	R3	(France) Nogaro	(France) No. 17 L'Espace Bienvenue	(France) No. 17 L'Espace Bienvenue	**(France) No. 89 AGS Events**	(France) No. 72 ANS Motorsport
1	R3	(France) Nogaro	(Netherlands) Ricardo van der Ende (Belgium) Benjamin Lessennes	(Netherlands) Ricardo van der Ende (Belgium) Benjamin Lessennes	**(France) Nicolas Gomar** **(France) Mike Parisy**	(France) Sylvain Caroff (France) Erwan Bastard
2	R1	(France) Magny-Cours	(Spain) No. 2 CD Sport	**(Spain) No. 2 CD Sport**	(France) No. 42 Sainteloc Racing	(France) No. 72 ANS Motorsport
2	R1	(France) Magny-Cours	(France) Edouard Cauhaupé (France) Fabien Lavergne	**(France) Edouard Cauhaupé** **(France) Fabien Lavergne**	(France) Fabien Michal (France) Grégory Guilvert	(France) Sylvain Caroff (France) Erwan Bastard
2	R2	(France) Magny-Cours	(France) No. 21 Sainteloc Racing	**(France) No. 17 L'Espace Bienvenue**	(France) No. 87 AKKA-ASP Team	(France) No. 5 Team Fullmotorsport
2	R2	(France) Magny-Cours	(France) Olivier Estèves (France) Anthony Beltoise	**(Netherlands) Ricardo van der Ende** **(Belgium) Benjamin Lessennes**	(France) Jean-Luc Beaubelique (France) Jim Pla	(France) Christophe Hamon (France) Pascal Huteau
3	R1	(France) Paul Ricard	(Spain) No. 2 CD Sport	**(Spain) No. 2 CD Sport**	(France) No. 89 AGS Events	(France) No. 66 CMR
3	R1	(France) Paul Ricard	(France) Edouard Cauhaupé (France) Fabien Lavergne	**(France) Edouard Cauhaupé** **(France) Fabien Lavergne**	(France) Nicolas Gomar (France) Mike Parisy	(France) Wilfried Cazalbon (France) César Gazeau
3	R2	(France) Paul Ricard	(Spain) No. 222 Mirage Racing	(France) No. 88 AKKA-ASP Team	**(Spain) No. 222 Mirage Racing**	(France) No. 5 Team Fullmotorsport
3	R2	(France) Paul Ricard	(France) Rodolphe Wallgren (France) Vincent Beltoise	(France) Thomas Drouet (France) Paul Petit	**(France) Rodolphe Wallgren** **(France) Vincent Beltoise**	(France) Christophe Hamon (France) Pascal Huteau
3	R3	(France) Paul Ricard	(France) No. 88 AKKA-ASP Team	**(Spain) No. 2 CD Sport**	(France) No. 89 AGS Events	(France) No. 161 AGS Events
3	R3	(France) Paul Ricard	(France) Thomas Drouet (France) Paul Petit	**(France) Edouard Cauhaupé** **(France) Fabien Lavergne**	(France) Nicolas Gomar (France) Mike Parisy	(France) Christophe Carriere (France) Didier Dumaine
4	R1	(France) Albi	(Spain) No. 22 Mirage Racing	(France) No. 8 Speed Car	(France) No. 36 CMR	(France) No. 72 ANS Motorsport
4	R1	(France) Albi	(France) Mateo Herrero (France) Morgan Moullin-Traffort	(France) Robert Consani (France) Benjamin Lariche	(France) Nicolas Prost (France) Christopher Campbell	(France) Sylvain Caroff (France) Erwan Bastard
4	R2	(France) Albi	(France) No. 87 AKKA-ASP Team	(France) No. 17 L'Espace Bienvenue	(France) No. 87 AKKA-ASP Team	(France) No. 66 CMR
4	R2	(France) Albi	(France) Jean-Luc Beaubelique (France) Jim Pla	(Netherlands) Ricardo van der Ende (Belgium) Benjamin Lessennes	(France) Jean-Luc Beaubelique (France) Jim Pla	(France) Wilfried Cazalbon (France) César Gazeau
5	R1	(France) Paul Ricard	(France) No. 30 CMR	**(France) No. 30 CMR**	(France) No. 36 CMR	(France) No. 66 CMR
5	R1	(France) Paul Ricard	(France) Aurélien Panis (France) Olivier Panis	**(France) Aurélien Panis** **(France) Olivier Panis**	(France) Nicolas Prost (France) Christopher Campbell	(France) Wilfried Cazalbon (France) César Gazeau
5	R2	(France) Paul Ricard	(France) No. 27 Sainteloc Racing	(France) No. 88 AKKA ASP Team	**(France) No. 89 AGS Events**	(France) No. 66 CMR
5	R2	(France) Paul Ricard	(France) Cyriel Saleilles (France) Adrien Tambay	(France) Thomas Drouet (France) Paul Petit	**(France) Nicolas Gomar** **(France) Mike Parisy**	(France) Wilfried Cazalbon (France) César Gazeau

== Championship standings ==
Scoring system

Championship points were awarded for the first ten positions in each race. Entries were required to complete 75% of the winning car's race distance in order to be classified and earn points. Individual drivers were required to participate for a minimum of 25 minutes in order to earn championship points in any race.

Position	**1st**	**2nd**	**3rd**	**4th**	**5th**	**6th**	**7th**	**8th**	**9th**	**10th**
Points	25	18	15	12	10	8	6	4	2	1

=== Drivers' championship ===
Pos.	Driver	Team	NOG (France)			MAG (France)		LEC1 (France)			ALB (France)		LEC2 (France)		Points
Silver
1	(Netherlands) Ricardo van der Ende (Belgium) Benjamin Lessennes	(France) L'Espace Bienvenue	**1**	4	2	3	**1**	3	Ret	Ret	3	5	12	8	201
2	(France) Edouard Cauhaupé (France) Fabien Lavergne	(Spain) CD Sport	20	28	3	**1**	10	**1**	4	**1**	7	9	23	21	187
3	(France) Thomas Drouet (France) Paul Petit	(France) AKKA ASP Team	3	10	26	4	24	2	3	3	4	26	6	3	184
4	(France) Robert Consani (France) Benjamin Lariche	(France) Speed Car	7	5	7	12	2	8	10	5	2	6	2	9	178
5	(France) Aurélien Panis	(France) CMR	8	9	5	5	11	9	7	30	12	11	**1**	4	159
6	(France) Julien Piguet	(France) CMR	8	9	5	5	11	9	7	30	12	11			116
7	(France) Andrea Benezet (France) Paul Evrard	(France) CMR	Ret	19	Ret	28	16	21	11	Ret	11	18	5	20	77
8	(France) Olivier Panis	(France) CMR											**1**	4	43
9	(France) Sacha Bottemanne (France) Lonni Martins	(France) Team Fullmotorsport						6	5	4					42
–	(France) Théo Nouet (France) Valentin Hasse-Clot	(France) AGS Events											Ret	WD	0
Pro-Am class
1	(France) Nicolas Gomar (France) Mike Parisy	(France) AGS Events	Ret	3	**1**	15	6	4	27	2	16	10	4	1	164
2	(France) Fabien Michal (France) Grégory Guilvert	(France) Saintéloc Racing	6	6	4	2	4	5	2	6	10	7	24	Ret	161
3	(France) Rodolphe Wallgren (France) Vincent Beltoise	(Spain) Mirage Racing	5	2	6	27	8	Ret	**1**	11	6	8	8	5	144
4	(France) Nicolas Prost (France) Christopher Campbell	(France) CMR	4	7	8	24	9	Ret	6	7	5	4	3	Ret	143
5	(France) Jean-Luc Beaubelique (France) Jim Pla	(France) AKKA ASP Team	15	**1**	13	14	3	25	22	13	13	2	13	6	110
6	(France) Grégoire Demoustier (France) Alain Ferté	(France) Bodemer Auto	Ret	11	12	6	Ret	7	Ret	9	9	17	7	2	99
7	(France) Eric Debard (France) Simon Gachet	(France) Saintéloc Racing	10	29	Ret	7	7	16	8	Ret	18	3	11	7	84
8	(France) Eric Clément (France) Romain Iannetta	(Spain) Mirage Racing	12	30	10	13	12	11	Ret	12	8	Ret	15	14	60
9	(France) Gilles Vannelet (India) Akhil Rabindra	(France) AGS Events	11	14	14	9	23	15	9	10	14	19	14	10	58
10	(France) Olivier Estèves (France) Anthony Beltoise	(France) Saintéloc Racing	13	12	Ret	11	20	18	15	29	20	13	9	18	40
11	(France) Fabien Barthez (France) Vincent Marserou	(France) AKKA ASP Team	9	8	9	25	Ret	Ret	14	14	21	27	16	16	39
12	(Switzerland) Philippe Giauque (France) Morgan Moulin-Traffort	(Spain) Mirage Racing	2	Ret	Ret			12	Ret	15					33
13	(France) Olivier Jouffret (France) Eric Trémoulet	(France) Vic'TEAM						10	Ret	8			25	11	30
14	(France) Cyriel Saleilles (France) Adrien Tambay	(France) Saintéloc Racing	Ret	22	25	Ret	22	14	17	16	17	16	10	**23**	23
15	(Russia) Dmitry Gvazava (France) Thomas Hodier	(France) Speed Car	Ret	27	11	16	Ret	24	16	19					12
16	(France) Clément Bully (France) Jean-Ludovic Foubert	(Spain) CD Sport	17	17	27	17	19	19	Ret	18	Ret	12	19	Ret	11
17	(United Kingdom) Ruben Del Sarte	(France) ABM Grand Prix	19	13	20	Ret	Ret	23	20	27					3
18	(France) Pierre-André Nicolas	(France) ABM Grand Prix	19	13	20	Ret	Ret								2
19	(France) Emilien Carde	(France) ABM Grand Prix						23	20	27					1
20	(France) Jean-Paul Buffin	(France) Saintéloc Racing	22	25	21						26	24	Ret	Ret	0
21	(France) Pierre Sancinéna	(France) Saintéloc Racing	22	25	21										0
22	(France) Arthur Rougier	(France) Saintéloc Racing									26	24	Ret	Ret	0
Guest drivers ineligible to score points
–	(France) Mateo Herrero (France) Morgan Moulin-Traffort	(Spain) Mirage Racing									**1**	1			–
–	(United Kingdom) Ruben Del Sarte	(France) ABM Grand Prix									Ret	Ret	Ret	WD	–
Am class
1	(France) Wilfried Cazalbon (France) César Gazeau	(France) CMR	27	15	17	20	Ret	13	13	22	22	14	17	12	197
2	(France) Christophe Hamon (France) Pascal Huteau	(France) Team Fullmotorsport	14	Ret	16	10	5	17	12	Ret	19	15	Ret	13	183
3	(France) Sylvain Caroff (France) Erwan Bastard	(France) ANS Motorsport	16	20	15	8	25	Ret	18	21	15	Ret	18	15	172
4	(France) Christophe Carriere (France) Didier Dumaine	(France) AGS Events	21	31	Ret	18	13	20	Ret	17	23	22	20	17	136
5	(France) Laurent Coubard	(France) Bodemer Auto	18	18	19	Ret	17	22	19	20	25	21	Ret	Ret	112
6	(France) Jean-Charles Rédélé	(France) Bodemer Auto	18	18	19	Ret	17	22	19	20			Ret	Ret	92
7	(Lebanon) Jihad Aboujaoudé	(Spain) CD Sport	24	23	22	19	21	29	23	26	Ret	23	21	22	86
8	(France) Pierre-Laurent Figuiére (France) Stephan Guerin	(France) Arkadia Racing	Ret	16	18	23	14	26	24	24	27	25			83
9	(France) Christophe Bourret (France) Pascal Gibon	(France) AKKA ASP Team	26	21	Ret	22	18	25	26	23	24	20			75
10	(Lebanon) Shahan Sarkissian	(Spain) CD Sport	24	23	22	19	21				Ret	23	21	22	70
11	(France) Michael Blanchemain	(France) Saintéloc Racing (France) Team Fullmotorsport				Ret	Ret	28	25	25			22	19	36
12	(France) Guillaume Maio (France) Alexandre Ducos	(France) GM Sport	23	24	23										22
13	(France) Jean-Laurent Navarro	(France) Team Fullmotorsport											22	19	20
14	(France) Jean-Paul Buffin	(France) Saintéloc Racing				Ret	Ret	28	25	25					16
15	(France) Antoine Heunet	(France) IMSA Performance				26	15								14
16	(France) Sylvain Debs (Russia) Vladimir Charchiyan	(France) Speed Car	25	26	24										14
17	(France) Joseph Collado (Germany) Eric Herr	(France) AGS Events						Ret	21	28					12
18	(France) Julien Lambert (France) Romano Ricci	(France) AGS Events				21	Ret								8
Pos.	Driver	Team	NOG (France)			MAG (France)		LEC (France)			ALB (France)		LEC2 (France)		Points

Key
Colour	Result
Gold	Race winner
Silver	2nd place
Bronze	3rd place
Green	Points finish
Blue	Non-points finish
Blue	Non-classified finish (NC)
Purple	Did not finish (Ret)
Black	Disqualified (DSQ)
Black	Excluded (EX)
White	Did not start (DNS)
White	Race cancelled (C)
White	Withdrew (WD)
Blank	Did not participate

**Bold** – Pole
Italics – Fastest Lap

== See also ==
- 2020 GT4 European Series
- 2020 ADAC GT4 Germany
