= Jay Mo Härtling =

German racing driver (born 2002)

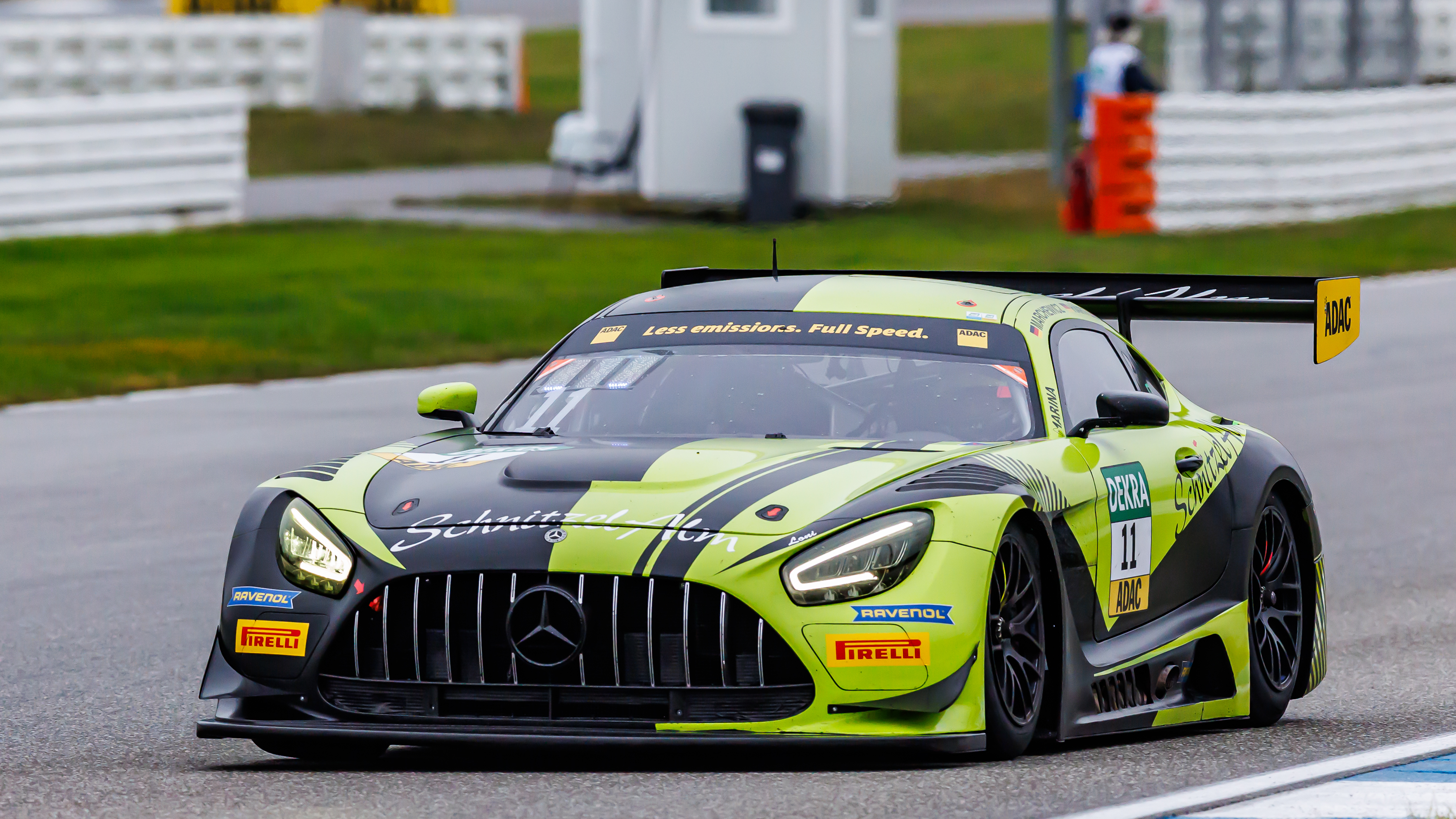
- Härtling in 2024
- Nationality: (Germany) German
- Born: 21 October 2002 (age 24) Sprockhövel, Germany
- Categorisation: FIA Silver

Championship titles
- 2026 2026 2025 2024 2024, 2026: GT2 European Series – Pro-Am; GT Summer Series – GT4 Pro; ADAC GT4 Germany; GTC Race – GT3 Pro; GT Winter Series – GT3

Jay Mo Härtling (born 21 October 2002) is a German racing driver who last competed in the GT2 European Series for SR Motorsport by Schnitzelalm. A homegrown talent of Schnitzelalm Racing, he is a two-time GT Winter Series champion and the reigning ADAC GT4 Germany champion.

== Career ==
An on-and-off karter since age 9, Härtling met Schnitzelalm Racing team boss Thomas Angerer in 2020, and began working as a mechanic before making his Nürburgring Langstrecken-Serie debut in 2022 in the BMW M240i class. Later that year, Härtling graduated to GT4 competition with the team, driving a Mercedes-AMG GT4 in the GT60 and GTC Race finale at the Hockenheimring. Continuing with Schnitzelalm for another season in NLS the following year, Härtling took a lone BMW M240i class win in NLS7, as well as finishing second in the SP-X class of the 24 Hours of Nürburgring. In parallel, Härtling raced in the GT4 class of GT60 and GTC Race, taking a lone win at the Lausitzring in the latter en route to runner-up honours in class.

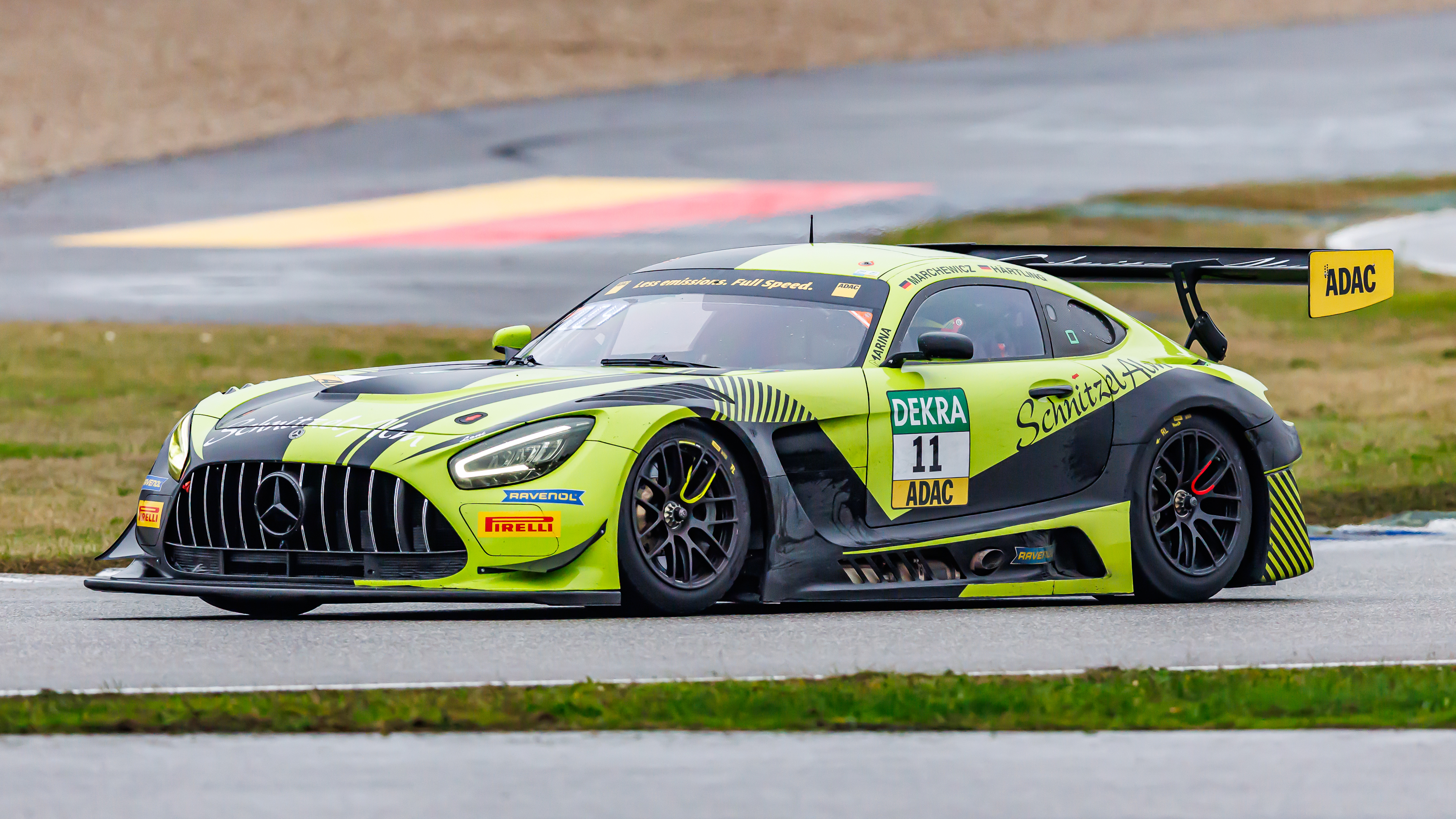
Härtling's Schnitzelalm Mercedes-AMG GT3 Evo at Hockenheim in 2024.

At the start of 2024, Härtling won in a one-off appearance in the GT4 Winter Series for Schnitzelalm, before moving up to the GT Winter Series, scoring seven wins and six other podiums to secure the GT3 title alongside Kenneth Heyer. Continuing with the Mercedes-AMG GT3 Evo for the rest of the year, Härtling primarily raced in GT60 and GTC Race, taking four class wins between the two series and the GT3 Pro title in the latter. During 2024, Härtling also finished second in SP9 Pro-Am at the 24 Hours of Nürburgring, as well as in a guest start in the ADAC GT Masters at Hockenheim with Marcel Marchewicz.

Returning to GT4 for 2025, Härtling joined forces with Enrico Förderer in the GT4 Winter Series, taking five wins to end runner-up in the Pro standings, before finishing second in class at the 6 Hours of Barcelona. Remaining with Schnitzelalm for the rest of the year, Härtling and Förderer began the ADAC GT4 Germany season with four straight wins at Oschersleben and Norisring, before scoring three other podiums to secure the series title. During 2025, Härtling also raced with the team on a part-time basis in the NLS and the 24 Hours of Nürburgring.

In 2026, Härtling returned to the GT Winter Series to clinch his second GT3 title alongside Kenneth Heyer with three wins to their name, as well as winning the 6H of Portimão in the GT4 class. For the rest of the year, Härtling continued with SR Motorsport by Schnitzelalm to race in the Pro-Am class of the GT2 European Series alongside David Thilenius. Partnering with David Thilenius for his first season in GT2, Härtling won both races at Monza as well as an additional win at Misano, en route to the Pro-Am title, whilst also securing top honours in SRO GT Academy, earning him a drive in the 2027 GT World Challenge Europe Endurance Cup with Mercedes-affiliated GetSpeed. During 2026, Härtling also competed at the 24 Hours of Nürburgring and NLS, and scored a podium in a guest entry he shared with Förderer in ADAC GT Masters, as well as winning on his GT4 Europe debut at Algarve.

== Racing record ==
=== Racing career summary ===
Season	Series	Team	Races	Wins	Poles	F/Laps	Podiums	Points	Position
2022	Nürburgring Langstrecken-Serie – BMW M240i	Schnitzelalm Racing	8						
2022	GT60 Race – GT4	Schnitzelalm Racing	1	0	0	0	0	0	NC†
2022	GTC Race – GT4	Schnitzelalm Racing	1	0	0	0	0	0	NC†
2023	GT Winter Series	Schnitzelalm Racing						28.03	35th
2023	Nürburgring Langstrecken-Serie – BMW M240i	Schnitzelalm Racing	5	1	0	0	2	0	NC
2023	Nürburgring Langstrecken-Serie – SP-X	Schnitzelalm Racing	1						
2023	24 Hours of Nürburgring – SP-X	Schnitzelalm Racing	1	0	0	0	1	—N/a	**2nd**
2023	24 Hours of Nürburgring – M240i	Schnitzelalm Racing	0	0	0	0	0	—N/a	WD
2023	GT60 Race – GT4	Schnitzelalm Racing	4	0	0	0	2	28	6th
2023	GTC Race – GT4	Schnitzelalm Racing	6	1	0	0	4	43.67	**2nd**
2024	GT4 Winter Series – Pro	Schnitzelalm Racing	3	1	0	0	3	21.25	5th
2024	GT Winter Series – GT3	Schnitzelalm Racing	18	7	0	0	13	113.22	**1st**
2024	GT60 Race – GT3 Semi-Pro	Schnitzelalm Racing	4	1	0	0	3	77.5	**2nd**
2024	GT60 Race – GT3 Pro	Schnitzelalm Racing	1	0	0	0	1	12.5	**2nd**
2024	GTC Race – GT3 Semi-Pro	Schnitzelalm Racing	4	2	0	0	4	78.5	**3rd**
2024	GTC Race – GT3 Pro	Schnitzelalm Racing	1	1	0	0	1	12.5	**1st**
2024	Nürburgring Langstrecken-Serie – BMW M240i	Teichmann Racing	1	0	0	0	0	0	NC
2024	Nürburgring Langstrecken-Serie – SP9 Pro-Am	Schnitzelalm Racing	2	0	0	0	0	0	NC
2024	24 Hours of Nürburgring – SP9 Pro-Am	Schnitzelalm Racing	1	0	0	0	1	—N/a	**2nd**
2024	Intercontinental GT Challenge	Schnitzelalm Racing	1	0	0	0	0	1	25th
2024	ADAC GT Masters	Schnitzelalm Racing	3	0	0	0	1	0	NC†
2024	24H Series – GT3 Am	PTT by Schnitzelalm Racing	1	0	0	0	0	20	19th
2025	GT4 Winter Series – Pro	Schnitzelalm Racing	15	5	5	6	12	252	**2nd**
2025	6H of Barcelona – GT4	Schnitzelalm Racing	1	0	0	0	1	—N/a	**2nd**
2025	ADAC GT4 Germany	Schnitzelalm Racing	12	4	5	2	7	194	**1st**
2025	Nürburgring Langstrecken-Serie – SP9 Pro-Am	SR Motorsport by Schnitzelalm	1	0	0	0	1	6	NC
2025	24 Hours of Nürburgring – SP9 Pro-Am	SR Motorsport by Schnitzelalm	1	0	0	0	0	—N/a	6th
2025	Intercontinental GT Challenge	SR Motorsport by Schnitzelalm	1	0	0	0	0	10	26th
2025	Nürburgring Langstrecken-Serie – SP8T	SR Motorsport by Schnitzelalm	1	0	1	0	0	3	NC
2026	GT Winter Series – GT3	SR Motorsport by Schnitzelalm	15	3			10	226	**1st**
2026	6H of Portimão – GT4	SR Motorsport by Schnitzelalm	1	1	0	0	1	—N/a	**1st**
2026	GT2 European Series – Pro-Am	SR Motorsport by Schnitzelalm	10	3	2	0	5	160	**1st**
2026	Nürburgring Langstrecken-Serie – SP9 Pro-Am	SR Motorsport by Schnitzelalm	3	2	0	0	2	15	NC
2026	24 Hours of Nürburgring – SP9 Pro-Am	SR Motorsport by Schnitzelalm	1	0	0	0	0	—N/a	9th
2026	Intercontinental GT Challenge	SR Motorsport by Schnitzelalm	1	0	0	0	0	0	NC
2026	ADAC GT Masters	SR Motorsport by Schnitzelalm	2	0	0	0	1	0	NC†
2026	GT Summer Series – GT4 Pro	SR Motorsport by Schnitzelalm	3	3	3	3	3	30	**1st**
2026	Nürburgring Langstrecken-Serie – SP10 Pro-Am	SR Motorsport by Schnitzelalm	1	1	0	0	1	15	NC
2026	GT4 European Series – Silver	SR Motorsport by Schnitzelalm	2	1	0	0	1	0	NC†
2026	Nürburgring Langstrecken-Serie – SP9 Pro	Mercedes-AMG Team Ravenol	1	0	0	0	1	8	NC
2026	Nürburgring Langstrecken-Serie – SP7	RPM Racing	1	0	0	0	0	0	NC
2027	GT World Challenge Europe Endurance Cup	GetSpeed						*	*

* Season still in progress.

^{†} As Härtling was a guest driver, he was ineligible for points.

=== Complete 24 Hours of Nürburgring results ===
Year	Team	Co-Drivers	Car	Class	Laps	Pos.	Class Pos.
2023	(Germany) Schnitzelalm Racing	(Canada) Mikaël Grenier (United States) David Thilenius (Germany) Moritz Wiskirchen	Mercedes-AMG GT2	SP-X	141	42nd	**2nd**
2023	(Germany) Schnitzelalm Racing	(Germany) Timo Kieslich (Germany) Tim Neuser (Germany) Charlotte Wilking	BMW M240i Racing	M240i	0	WD	WD
2024	(Germany) Schnitzelalm Racing	(Germany) Marcel Marchewicz (Germany) Kenneth Heyer	Mercedes-AMG GT3 Evo	SP9; Pro-Am	49	14th	**2nd**
2025	(Germany) SR Motorsport by Schnitzelalm	(Germany) Christopher Brück (Germany) Jannes Fittje (Germany) Kenneth Heyer	Mercedes-AMG GT3 Evo	SP9; Pro-Am	134	13th	6th
2026	(Germany) SR Motorsport by Schnitzelalm	(Switzerland) Philip Ellis (Germany) Jannes Fittje (Germany) Kenneth Heyer	Mercedes-AMG GT3 Evo	SP9; Pro-Am	108	100th	9th

=== Complete ADAC GT Masters results ===
(key) (Races in bold indicate pole position) (Races in italics indicate fastest lap)

Year	Team	Car	1	2	3	4	5	6	7	8	9	10	11	12	DC	Points
2024	Schnitzelalm Racing	Mercedes-AMG GT3 Evo	OSC; 1	OSC; 2	ZAN; 1	ZAN; 2	NÜR; 1 DNS	NÜR; 2; 13	SPA; 1	SPA; 2	RBR; 1	RBR; 2	**HOC**; **1**; 2	HOC; 2 Ret	NC†	0†
2026	SR Motorsport by Schnitzelalm	Mercedes-AMG GT3 Evo	RBR; 1	RBR; 2	ZAN; 1	ZAN; 2	LAU; 1	LAU; 2	NÜR; 1; 5	NÜR; 2; 3	SAL; 1	SAL; 2	HOC; 1	HOC; 2	NC†	0†

=== Complete ADAC GT4 Germany results ===
(key) (Races in bold indicate pole position) (Races in italics indicate fastest lap)

Year	Team	Car	1	2	3	4	5	6	7	8	9	10	11	12	Pos	Points
2025	SR Motorsport by Schnitzelalm Racing	Mercedes-AMG GT4	OSC; 1; 1	**OSC**; **2**; 1	**NOR**; **1**; 1	**NOR**; **2**; 1	**NÜR**; **1**; 5	NÜR; 2; 3	SAC; 1 Ret	SAC; 2; 7	RBR; 1; 8	**RBR**; **2**; 3	HOC; 1; 4	HOC; 2; 2	1st	194

=== Complete GT2 European Series results ===
(key) (Races in bold indicate pole position) (Races in italics indicate fastest lap)

Year	Team	Car	Class	1	2	3	4	5	6	7	8	9	10	Pos	Points
2026	SR Motorsport by Schnitzelalm	Mercedes-AMG GT2	Pro-Am	MNZ; 1; 1	**MNZ**; **2**; 1	SPA; 1; 2	SPA; 2; 5	MIS; 1; 6	**MIS**; **2**; 1	ZAN; 1; 3	ZAN; 2; 5	ALG; 1; 5	ALG; 2; 6	1st	160

=== Complete GT4 European Series results ===
(key) (Races in bold indicate pole position) (Races in italics indicate fastest lap)

Year	Team	Car	Class	1	2	3	4	5	6	7	8	9	10	11	12	Pos	Points
2026	SR Motorsport by Schnitzelalm	Mercedes-AMG GT4	Silver	LEC; 1	LEC; 2	MNZ; 1	MNZ; 2	SPA; 1	SPA; 2	MIS; 1	MIS; 2	ZAN; 1	ZAN; 2	ALG; 1; 1	ALG; 2; 4	NC†	0†
