= Raphael Rennhofer =

Austrian racing driver (born 2006)

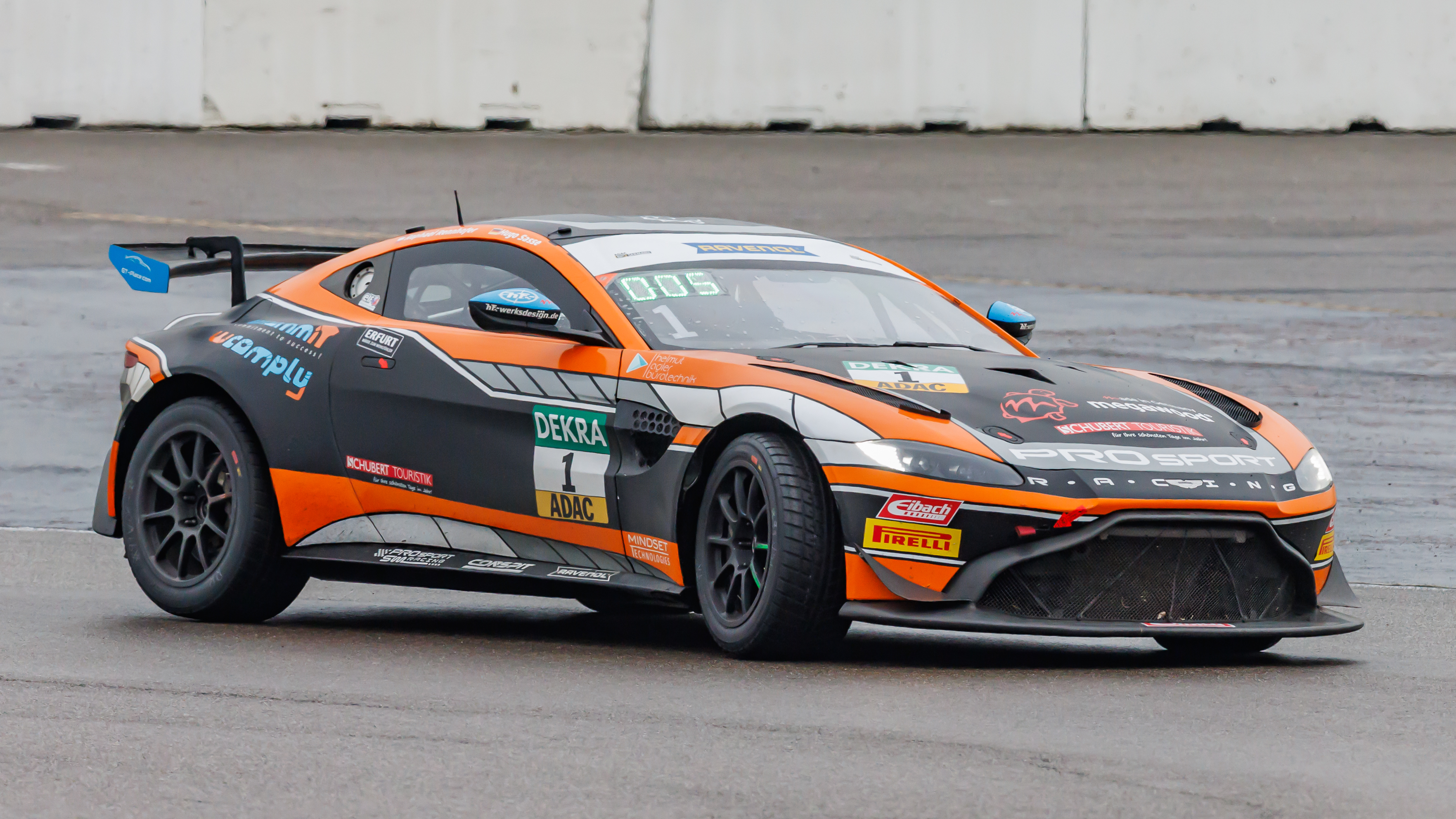
- Rennhofer in 2024
- Nationality: (Austria) Austrian
- Born: 26 December 2006 (age 19) Mödling, Austria
- Categorisation: FIA Silver

Raphael Rennhofer (born 26 December 2006) is an Austrian racing driver who last competed in the Porsche Endurance Trophy Nürburgring Cup for Black Falcon.

== Career ==
A native of Mödling, Rennhofer had his first taste of karting at the age of 6, after being inspired by his father and grandfather, both involved in motorsports, before turning to the competitive scene full-time until 2022. Competing in Europe during his karting career, Rennhofer won the 2019 RMC Germany title in Mini Max, before finishing third two years later in Junior Max, as he earned invitations to the RMC Grand Finals on both occasions.

After serving as Pfister Racing's test driver in 2021, Rennhofer made his car racing debut in 2022, contesting the Pfister-Racing Tourenwagen Challenge over the next two seasons. In 2023, at only 16 years old, Rennhofer joined Aston Martin-fielding PROsport Racing to compete in the final four rounds of ADAC GT4 Germany, where he took a best result of seventh at the Nürburgring.

After a planned step to Porsche Carrera Cup competition fell through at the last minute, Rennhofer remained in the GT4 category for 2024. He began the year with a lone podium in the GT4 Winter Series for Porsche customer team Wimmer Werk Motorsport, before returning to PROsport to drive an Aston Martin Vantage AMR GT4 in the GT4 European Series. Racing alongside Hugo Sasse, Rennhofer won on debut at Le Castellet and got a podium at Spa, before the team departed with two rounds to go over balance of performance complaints. While he returned to Wimmer Werk for Monza, Rennhofer also made cameo appearances with PROsport in ADAC GT Masters, making his GT3 debut at Spa, and ADAC GT4 Germany, taking a pole and a win at the Hockenheimring.

In 2025, Rennhofer rejoined Wimmer Werk for ADAC GT4 Germany, sharing a Porsche 718 Cayman GT4 RS Clubsport with Emil Heyerdahl. Starting off with a pair of podiums at Oschersleben, Rennhofer clinched his only win of the season at the Hockenheim finale to finish fourth in points. That year, Rennhofer featured in various classes of the Nürburgring Langstrecken-Serie, and won the Manthey-licensed Porsche Esports Endurance Trophy Nürburgring title, which earned him training and education at the PETN Talent Pool. In 2026, Rennhofer embarked on his first full season in the Cup2 class of the Porsche Endurance Trophy Nürburgring with Black Falcon, taking four poles and a win, as well as coming second at the 24 Hours of Nürburgring. Towards the end of the year, Rennhofer joined Porsche-fielding High Class Racing to enter the Algarve finale of the GT World Challenge Europe Endurance Cup. Rennhofer then joined Porsche-affiliated Manthey Racing to compete in the GT3 class of the 2026–27 Asian Le Mans Series.

== Personal life ==
Outside of racing, Rennhofer is a professional sim racer for EMM Esports and has been working freelance for Mindset Technologies since 2022 in cognitive monitoring in racing cars.

== Karting record ==
=== Karting career summary ===
Season	Series	Team	Position
2018	Hungarian International Open — Mini Max		5th
2019	RMC Grand Finals — Mini Max	Speedworld	13th
2020	RMC Euro Trophy — Junior Max		18th
2020	RMC Germany — Junior Max		7th
2020	BNL Karting Series — Rotax Max Junior		
2021	RMC Euro Trophy — Junior Max	FM Racing	7th
2021	RMC Germany — Junior Max		3rd
2021	RMC Euro Golden Trophy — Junior Max	FM Racing	4th
2021	RMC Grand Finals — Junior Max	FM Racing	22nd
2022	RMC Euro Trophy — Senior Max	FM Racing	12th
2022	RMC Germany — Senior Max		5th
2023	RMC Euro Trophy — Senior Max	KCSA Sodi Europe	99th
2024	RMC Euro Trophy — Senior Max	TNR Austria	59th

== Racing record ==
=== Racing career summary ===
Season	Series	Team	Races	Wins	Poles	F/Laps	Podiums	Points	Position
2023	ADAC GT4 Germany	PROsport Racing	8	0	0	0	0	30	20th
2024	GT4 Winter Series – Pro	Wimmer Werk Motorsport	3	0	0	0	1		
2024	GT4 European Series – Silver	PROsport Racing	8	1	0	0	2	50	10th
2024	GT4 European Series – Silver	Wimmer Werk Motorsport	2	0	0	0	0	50	10th
2024	ADAC GT Masters	PROsport Racing	2	0	0	0	0	0	NC†
2024	ADAC GT4 Germany	PROsport Racing	2	1	1	0	2	0	NC†
2025	Nürburgring Langstrecken-Serie – VT2-FWD+4WD	Keeevin Sports and Racing	1	0	0	0	0	12	NC
2025	Nürburgring Langstrecken-Serie – VT2-FWD+4WD	SRS Team Sorg Rennsport	2	0	0	0	1	12	NC
2025	Nürburgring Langstrecken-Serie – BMW M240i	Adrenalin Motorsport Team Mainhattan Wheels	1	0	0	0	0	1	NC
2025	Porsche Carrera Cup Germany	Team Wimmer Werk Motorsport	2	0	0	0	0	0	NC†
2025	ADAC GT4 Germany	Wimmer Werk Motorsport	12	1	0	0	3	150	4th
2025	24 Hours of Nürburgring – SP8T	PROsport Racing	1	0	0	0	0	—N/a	DNF
2025	Nürburgring Langstrecken-Serie – SP8T	PROsport Racing	1	0	0	0	1	11	NC
2025	Nürburgring Langstrecken-Serie – SP10	PROsport Racing	1	0	0	0	0	0	NC
2025	Nürburgring Langstrecken-Serie – SP7	PROsport Racing	1	0	0	0	0	0	NC
2026	Porsche Endurance Trophy Nürburgring – Cup2	Team Liqui Moly by Black Falcon						*	*
2026	Porsche Endurance Trophy Nürburgring – Cup2	Black Falcon						*	*
2026	24 Hours of Nürburgring – Cup2 Pro	Team Liqui Moly by Black Falcon	1	0	0	0	1	—N/a	**2nd**
2026	GT World Challenge Europe Endurance Cup	High Class Racing	1	0	0	0	0	0	NC†
2026	GT World Challenge Europe Endurance Cup – Bronze	High Class Racing	1	0	0	0	0	0	NC†
2026–27	Asian Le Mans Series – GT3	Manthey Racing						*	*

^{†} As Rennhofer was a guest driver, he was ineligible to score points.

=== Complete ADAC GT4 Germany results ===
(key) (Races in bold indicate pole position) (Races in italics indicate fastest lap)

Year	Team	Car	1	2	3	4	5	6	7	8	9	10	11	12	Pos	Points
2023	PROsport Racing	Aston Martin Vantage AMR GT4	OSC1; 1	OSC1; 2	ZAN; 1	ZAN; 2	NÜR; 1; 7	NÜR; 2; 18	LAU; 1; 14	LAU; 2 Ret	SAC; 1; 11	SAC; 2; 16	HOC; 1; 8	HOC; 2; 12	20th	30
2024	PROsport Racing	Aston Martin Vantage AMR GT4	OSC; 1	OSC; 2	LAU; 1	LAU; 2	NOR; 1	NOR; 2	NÜR; 1	NÜR; 2	RBR; 1	RBR; 2	HOC; 1; 1	**HOC**; **2**; 2	NC†	0†
2025	Wimmer Werk Motorsport	Porsche 718 Cayman GT4 RS Clubsport	OSC; 1; 2	OSC; 2; 3	NOR; 1; 7	NOR; 2; 10	NÜR; 1; 8	NÜR; 2; 4	SAC; 1; 4	SAC; 2; 6	RBR; 1; 4	RBR; 2; 4	HOC; 1; 1	HOC; 2 DSQ	4th	150

^{†} As Rennhofer was a guest driver, he was ineligible for points.

=== Complete GT4 European Series results ===
(key) (Races in bold indicate pole position) (Races in italics indicate fastest lap)

Year	Team	Car	Class	1	2	3	4	5	6	7	8	9	10	11	12	Pos	Points
2024	PROsport Racing	Aston Martin Vantage AMR GT4	Silver	LEC; 1; 41†	LEC; 2; 1	MIS; 1 Ret	MIS; 2; 35†	SPA; 1; 3	SPA; 2; 7	HOC; 1; 17	HOC; 2; 12					10th	50
2024	Wimmer Werk Motorsport	Porsche 718 Cayman GT4 RS Clubsport	Silver									MNZ; 1; 42†	MNZ; 2; 8	JED; 1	JED; 2	10th	50

=== Complete ADAC GT Masters results ===
(key) (Races in bold indicate pole position) (Races in italics indicate fastest lap)

Year	Team	Car	1	2	3	4	5	6	7	8	9	10	11	12	DC	Points
2024	PROsport Racing	Aston Martin Vantage AMR GT3	OSC; 1	OSC; 2	ZAN; 1	ZAN; 2	NÜR; 1	NÜR; 2	SPA; 1; 11	SPA; 2; 13	RBR; 1	RBR; 2	HOC; 1	HOC; 2	NC†	0†

=== Complete 24 Hours of Nürburgring results ===
Year	Team	Co-Drivers	Car	Class	Laps	Pos.	Class Pos.
2025	(Germany) PROsport Racing	(Belgium) Guido Dumarey (Belgium) Maxime Dumarey (Germany) Marcel Marchewicz	Aston Martin Vantage AMR GT4	SP8T	47	DNF	DNF
2026	(Germany) Team Liqui Moly by Black Falcon	(United States) Ryan Harrison (Germany) Noah Nagelsdiek (Germany) Leon Wassertheurer	Porsche 911 GT3 Cup (992.1)	Cup2 Pro	148	18th	**2nd**

=== Complete GT World Challenge Europe results ===
==== GT World Challenge Europe Endurance Cup ====
Year	Team	Car	Class	1	2	3	4	5	6	7	Pos.	Points
2026	High Class Racing	Porsche 911 GT3 R (992.2)	Bronze	LEC	MNZ	SPA; 6H	SPA; 12H	SPA; 24H	NÜR	ALG; Ret	NC	0
