= GT Winter Series =

The GT Winter Series includes:

- The 2024 GT Winter Series
- The 2025 GT Winter Series
- The 2026 GT Winter Series

== See also ==
- 2024 GT4 Winter Series
- 2025 GT4 Winter Series
- 2026 GT4 Winter Series
