= 2024 ADAC GT Masters =

Sports car racing series season

The 2024 ADAC GT Masters was the eighteenth season of the ADAC GT Masters, the grand tourer-style sports car racing series founded by the German automobile club ADAC.

== Calendar ==
Round	Circuit	Location	Race 1	Race 2
1	(Germany) Motorsport Arena Oschersleben	Oschersleben, Saxony-Anhalt	27 April	28 April
2	(Netherlands) Circuit Zandvoort	Zandvoort, North Holland	8 June	9 June
3	(Germany) Nürburgring	Nürburg, Rhineland-Palatinate	13 July	14 July
4	(Belgium) Circuit de Spa-Francorchamps	Stavelot, Liège	31 August	1 September
5	(Austria) Red Bull Ring	Spielberg, Styria	28 September	29 September
6	(Germany) Hockenheimring	Hockenheim, Baden-Württemberg	19 October	20 October

== Entry list ==
Team	Car	No.	Driver	Class	Status	Rounds
(Germany) Landgraf Motorsport	Mercedes-AMG GT3 Evo	1	(Germany) Tom Kalender	S		All
(Germany) Landgraf Motorsport	Mercedes-AMG GT3 Evo	1	(Finland) Elias Seppänen	S		All
(Germany) Haupt Racing Team	Mercedes-AMG GT3 Evo	2	(Germany) Salman Owega	S		All
(Germany) Haupt Racing Team	Mercedes-AMG GT3 Evo	2	(Germany) David Schumacher	S		All
(Germany) Haupt Racing Team	Mercedes-AMG GT3 Evo	3	(Germany) Jannes Fittje	S		All
(Germany) Haupt Racing Team	Mercedes-AMG GT3 Evo	3	(Germany) Finn Wiebelhaus	S		All
(Germany) Haupt Racing Team	Mercedes-AMG GT3 Evo	5	(South Africa) Kwanda Mokoena	S		All
(Germany) Haupt Racing Team	Mercedes-AMG GT3 Evo	5	(Germany) Max Reis	S		All
(Germany) Haupt Racing Team	Mercedes-AMG GT3 Evo	79	(Germany) Dennis Fetzer	PA	G	5
(Germany) Haupt Racing Team	Mercedes-AMG GT3 Evo	79	(Germany) Hubert Haupt	PA	G	5
(Switzerland) FACH AUTO TECH	Porsche 911 GT3 R (992)	4	(Switzerland) Alexander Fach	PA		All
(Switzerland) FACH AUTO TECH	Porsche 911 GT3 R (992)	4	(Switzerland) Alexander Schwarzer	PA		All
(Germany) racing one	Ferrari 296 GT3	6	(Italy) Fabrizio Crestani	PA	G	5
(Germany) racing one	Ferrari 296 GT3	6	(Austria) Ernst Kirchmayr	PA	G	5
(Germany) DB Motorsport	Porsche 911 GT3 R (991.2)	7	(Germany) Hermann Speck	PA	G	5
(Germany) DB Motorsport	Porsche 911 GT3 R (991.2)	7	(Austria) Gerhard Tweraser	PA	G	5
(Germany) Liqui Moly Team Engstler by NordVPN	Audi R8 LMS Evo II	8	(Lithuania) Jonas Karklys	S 1-3(R1); PA 3(R2)-6	G 3(R2)-6	All
(Germany) Liqui Moly Team Engstler by NordVPN	Audi R8 LMS Evo II	8	(Germany) Pablo Schumm	S 1-3(R1); PA 3(R2)-6	G 3(R2)-6	All
(Germany) FK Performance Motorsport	BMW M4 GT3	10	(Philippines) Eduardo Coseteng	S		All
(Germany) FK Performance Motorsport	BMW M4 GT3	10	(Switzerland) Grégory de Sybourg	S		1–4, 6
(Germany) FK Performance Motorsport	BMW M4 GT3	10	(Brazil) Pedro Ebrahim	S		5
(Germany) FK Performance Motorsport	BMW M4 GT3	54	(Germany) Leon Köhler	S		All
(Germany) FK Performance Motorsport	BMW M4 GT3	54	(Netherlands) Maxime Oosten	S		All
(Germany) Schnitzelalm Racing	Mercedes-AMG GT3 Evo	11	(Germany) Marcel Marchewicz	S	G	3, 6
(Germany) Schnitzelalm Racing	Mercedes-AMG GT3 Evo	11	(Germany) Julian Hanses	S	G	3
(Germany) Schnitzelalm Racing	Mercedes-AMG GT3 Evo	11	(Germany) Jay Mo Härtling	S	G	6
(Germany) Schnitzelalm Racing	Mercedes-AMG GT3 Evo	12	(Germany) Jay Mo Härtling	S	G	3
(Germany) Schnitzelalm Racing	Mercedes-AMG GT3 Evo	12	(Germany) Moritz Wiskirchen	S	G	3
(Switzerland) Emil Frey Racing	Ferrari 296 GT3	14	(Switzerland) Jean-Luc D'Auria	S		All
(Switzerland) Emil Frey Racing	Ferrari 296 GT3	14	(Switzerland) Alain Valente	S		All
(Austria) HP Racing International	Lamborghini Huracán GT3 Evo 2	17	(Germany) Coach McKansy	PA	G	3
(Austria) HP Racing International	Lamborghini Huracán GT3 Evo 2	17	(Austria) Gerhard Tweraser	PA	G	3
(Austria) GRT Grasser Racing Team	Lamborghini Huracán GT3 Evo 2	19	(Germany) Jannik Julius-Bernhart	S 1-3; PA 4-6	G 4-6	1–3
(Austria) GRT Grasser Racing Team	Lamborghini Huracán GT3 Evo 2	19	(United States) Taylor Hagler	S 1-3; PA 4-6	G 4-6	1, 4–6
(Austria) GRT Grasser Racing Team	Lamborghini Huracán GT3 Evo 2	19	(Austria) Gerhard Tweraser	S 1-3; PA 4-6	G 4-6	2, 4, 6
(Austria) GRT Grasser Racing Team	Lamborghini Huracán GT3 Evo 2	19	(Italy) Mateo Llarena	S 1-3; PA 4-6	G 4-6	3
(Austria) GRT Grasser Racing Team	Lamborghini Huracán GT3 Evo 2	19	(France) Loris Cabirou	S 1-3; PA 4-6	G 4-6	5
(Austria) GRT Grasser Racing Team	Lamborghini Huracán GT3 Evo 2	63	(Chile) Benjamín Hites	S		All
(Austria) GRT Grasser Racing Team	Lamborghini Huracán GT3 Evo 2	63	(Germany) Tim Zimmermann	S		1–4, 6
(Austria) GRT Grasser Racing Team	Lamborghini Huracán GT3 Evo 2	63	(Germany) Pierre Kaffer	S		5
(Germany) PROsport Racing	Aston Martin Vantage AMR GT3	27	(Austria) Raphael Rennhofer	S	G	4
(Germany) PROsport Racing	Aston Martin Vantage AMR GT3	27	(Germany) Hugo Sasse	S	G	4
(Germany) PROsport Racing	Aston Martin Vantage AMR GT3	37	(United Kingdom) Jamie Day	S	G	4
(Germany) PROsport Racing	Aston Martin Vantage AMR GT3	37	(Germany) Hendrik Still	S	G	4
(Germany) Land-Motorsport	Audi R8 LMS Evo II	29	(Germany) Juliano Holzem	S		All
(Germany) Land-Motorsport	Audi R8 LMS Evo II	29	(Germany) Sandro Holzem	S		All
(Germany) Paul Motorsport	Lamborghini Huracán GT3 Evo 2	33	(Germany) Jonas Greif	S		All
(Germany) Paul Motorsport	Lamborghini Huracán GT3 Evo 2	33	(Germany) Simon Connor Primm	S		All
(Germany) Walkenhorst Motorsport	Aston Martin Vantage AMR GT3 Evo	34	(Germany) Denis Bulatov	S		All
(Germany) Walkenhorst Motorsport	Aston Martin Vantage AMR GT3 Evo	34	(Germany) Mike David Ortmann	S		All
(Germany) Walkenhorst Motorsport	Aston Martin Vantage AMR GT3 Evo	35	(Germany) Nico Hantke	S 1-2; PA 3-6	G 3-6	All
(Germany) Walkenhorst Motorsport	Aston Martin Vantage AMR GT3 Evo	35	(United States) Chandler Hull	S 1-2; PA 3-6	G 3-6	All
(Switzerland) Wolf-Racing	Audi R8 LMS Evo II	77	(Switzerland) Florian Blatter	PA	G	5
(Switzerland) Wolf-Racing	Audi R8 LMS Evo II	77	(Austria) Max Hofer	PA	G	5
(Germany) Team Joos by TwinBusch	Porsche 911 GT3 R (992)	91	(Germany) Johannes Kapfinger	S		All
(Germany) Team Joos by TwinBusch	Porsche 911 GT3 R (992)	91	(Germany) Michael Kapfinger	S		All

ADAC GT Masters entries
Icon	Class
S	Silver Cup
PA	Pro-Am Cup
Am	Am Cup
Icon	Status
G	Guest entries ineligible for points

== Results ==
Rnd.	Race	Circuit	Pole position	Race winner
1	R1	(Germany) Motorsport Arena Oschersleben	(Germany) No. 54 FK Performance Motorsport	(Germany) No. 54 FK Performance Motorsport
1	R1	(Germany) Motorsport Arena Oschersleben	(Germany) Leon Köhler (Netherlands) Maxime Oosten	(Germany) Leon Köhler (Netherlands) Maxime Oosten
1	R2	(Germany) Motorsport Arena Oschersleben	(Germany) No. 2 Haupt Racing Team	(Germany) No. 1 Landgraf Motorsport
1	R2	(Germany) Motorsport Arena Oschersleben	(Germany) Salman Owega (Germany) David Schumacher	(Germany) Tom Kalender (Finland) Elias Seppänen
2	R1	(Netherlands) Circuit Zandvoort	(Germany) No. 1 Landgraf Motorsport	(Germany) No. 1 Landgraf Motorsport
2	R1	(Netherlands) Circuit Zandvoort	(Germany) Tom Kalender (Finland) Elias Seppänen	(Germany) Tom Kalender (Finland) Elias Seppänen
2	R2	(Netherlands) Circuit Zandvoort	(Austria) No. 63 GRT Grasser Racing Team	(Germany) No. 54 FK Performance Motorsport
2	R2	(Netherlands) Circuit Zandvoort	(Chile) Benjamín Hites (Germany) Tim Zimmermann	(Germany) Leon Köhler (Netherlands) Maxime Oosten
3	R1	(Germany) Nürburgring	(Austria) No. 63 GRT Grasser Racing Team	(Germany) No. 2 Haupt Racing Team
3	R1	(Germany) Nürburgring	(Chile) Benjamín Hites (Germany) Tim Zimmermann	(Germany) Salman Owega (Germany) David Schumacher
3	R2	(Germany) Nürburgring	(Germany) No. 2 Haupt Racing Team	(Germany) No. 2 Haupt Racing Team
3	R2	(Germany) Nürburgring	(Germany) Salman Owega (Germany) David Schumacher	(Germany) Salman Owega (Germany) David Schumacher
4	R1	(Belgium) Circuit de Spa-Francorchamps	(Germany) No. 1 Landgraf Motorsport	(Germany) No. 1 Landgraf Motorsport
4	R1	(Belgium) Circuit de Spa-Francorchamps	(Germany) Tom Kalender (Finland) Elias Seppänen	(Germany) Tom Kalender (Finland) Elias Seppänen
4	R2	(Belgium) Circuit de Spa-Francorchamps	(Switzerland) No. 14 Emil Frey Racing	(Germany) No. 54 FK Performance Motorsport
4	R2	(Belgium) Circuit de Spa-Francorchamps	(Switzerland) Jean-Luc D'Auria (Switzerland) Alain Valente	(Germany) Leon Köhler (Netherlands) Maxime Oosten
5	R1	(Austria) Red Bull Ring	(Germany) No. 5 Haupt Racing Team	(Germany) No. 3 Haupt Racing Team
5	R1	(Austria) Red Bull Ring	(South Africa) Kwanda Mokoena (Germany) Max Reis	(Germany) Jannes Fittje (Germany) Finn Wiebelhaus
5	R2	(Austria) Red Bull Ring	(Germany) No. 1 Landgraf Motorsport	(Germany) No. 1 Landgraf Motorsport
5	R2	(Austria) Red Bull Ring	(Germany) Tom Kalender (Finland) Elias Seppänen	(Germany) Tom Kalender (Finland) Elias Seppänen
6	R1	(Germany) Hockenheimring	(Germany) No. 11 Schnitzelalm Racing	(Germany) No. 2 Haupt Racing Team
6	R1	(Germany) Hockenheimring	(Germany) Marcel Marchewicz (Germany) Jay Mo Härtling	(Germany) Salman Owega (Germany) David Schumacher
6	R2	(Germany) Hockenheimring	(Switzerland) No. 14 Emil Frey Racing	(Germany) No. 1 Landgraf Motorsport
6	R2	(Germany) Hockenheimring	(Switzerland) Jean-Luc D'Auria (Switzerland) Alain Valente	(Germany) Tom Kalender (Finland) Elias Seppänen

== Championship standings ==
Scoring system

Championship points are awarded for the first fifteen positions in each race. Entries are required to complete 75% of the winning car's race distance in order to be classified and earn points. Individual drivers are required to participate for a minimum of 25 minutes in order to earn championship points in any race.

Position	**1st**	**2nd**	**3rd**	**4th**	**5th**	**6th**	**7th**	**8th**	**9th**	**10th**	**11th**	**12th**	**13th**	**14th**	**15th**
Points	25	20	16	13	11	10	9	8	7	6	5	4	3	2	1
Qualifying	3	2	1												

=== Drivers' championships ===
==== Overall ====
Pos.	Driver	Team	OSC (Germany)		ZAN (Netherlands)		NÜR (Germany)		SPA (Belgium)		RBR (Austria)		HOC (Germany)		Points
1	(Germany) Tom Kalender (Finland) Elias Seppänen	(Germany) Landgraf Motorsport	2^{3}	1^{2}	**1**^{1}	8	2^{2}	6^{3}	**1**^{1}	6^{2}	3	**1**^{1}	3^{1}	1^{2}	253
2	(Netherlands) Maxime Oosten (Germany) Leon Köhler	(Germany) FK Performance Motorsport	**1**^{1}	4	5	1	4	3	4	1	5	3^{3}	9	2	205
3	(Germany) David Schumacher (Germany) Salman Owega	(Germany) Haupt Racing Team	6	**Ret**^{1}	6^{2}	3^{2}	1	**1**^{1}	Ret	7	2	4	1^{2}	7	172
4	(Germany) Finn Wiebelhaus (Germany) Jannes Fittje	(Germany) Haupt Racing Team	4	2^{3}	4	6	Ret^{3}	2^{2}	10	8	1^{2}	10	7	6	151
5	(Switzerland) Jean-Luc D'Auria (Switzerland) Alain Valente	(Switzerland) Emil Frey Racing	7	6	10	7	15	5	2^{2}	**Ret**^{1}	20†	2^{2}	8	**3**^{1}	128
6	(Chile) Benjamín Hites	(Austria) GRT Grasser Racing Team	11^{2}	5	2^{3}	10	**5**^{1}	14	8^{3}	4	14	9	9	5	128
7	(Germany) Alexander Schwarzer (Switzerland) Alexander Fach	(Switzerland) Fach Auto Tech	8	8	9	2	8	7	15†	2	11	12	4	5	120
8	(Germany) Mike David Ortmann (Germany) Denis Bulatov	(Germany) Walkenhorst Motorsport	9	7	3	5^{3}	9	9	3	5^{3}	16	7	10	9	117
9	(Germany) Tim Zimmermann	(Austria) GRT Grasser Racing Team	11^{2}	5	2^{3}	10	**5**^{1}	14	8^{3}	4			9	5	114
10	(Germany) Michael Kapfinger (Germany) Johannes Kapfinger	(Germany) Team Joos by TwinBusch	5	3	7	4	6	10	7	Ret	15	8	Ret^{3}	8	100
11	(Germany) Juliano Holzem (Germany) Sandro Holzem	(Germany) Land-Motorsport	WD	WD	11	12	7	12	6	14	10	6	5	4^{3}	89
12	(Germany) Simon Connor Primm (Germany) Jonas Greif	(Germany) Paul Motorsport	10	10	13	**13**^{1}	10	8	12	10	7^{3}	14	14	11	77
13	(South Africa) Kwanda Mokoena (Germany) Max Reis	(Germany) Haupt Racing Team	3	9	8	Ret	17†	15	14	9	**4**^{1}	Ret	Ret	10	73
14	(Philippines) Eduardo Coseteng	(Germany) FK Performance Motorsport	13†	11	12	9	11	16	Ret	15	13	15	15	14	53
15	(Switzerland) Grégory de Sybourg	(Germany) FK Performance Motorsport	13†	11	12	9	11	16	Ret	15			15	14	42
16	(Germany) Pierre Kaffer	(Austria) GRT Grasser Racing Team									14	9			14
17	(Germany) Jannik Julius-Bernhart	(Austria) GRT Grasser Racing Team	Ret	14	15	11	14	18							14
18	(Brazil) Pedro Ebrahim	(Germany) FK Performance Motorsport									13	15			11
19	(Germany) Pablo Schumm (Lithuania) Jonas Karklys	(Germany) Liqui Moly Team Engstler by NordVPN	Ret	12	14	Ret	13	17	Ret	3	12	17	12	12	11
20	(Germany) Nico Hantke (United States) Chandler Hull	(Germany) Walkenhorst Motorsport	12	13	16†	13	12	11	5	Ret	17	13	11	13	10
21	(Austria) Gerhard Tweraser	(Austria) GRT Grasser Racing Team			15	11			9	12			13	Ret	6
21	(Austria) Gerhard Tweraser	(Austria) HP Racing International					16	19							6
21	(Austria) Gerhard Tweraser	(Germany) DB Motorsport									18	18			6
22	(Italy) Mateo Llarena	(Austria) GRT Grasser Racing Team					14	18							6
23	(United States) Taylor Hagler	(Austria) GRT Grasser Racing Team	Ret	14					9	12	8	Ret	13	Ret	2
Ineligible for championship
–	(Germany) Marcel Marchewicz	(Germany) Schnitzelalm Racing					3	4					**2**	Ret	–
–	(Germany) Jay Mo Härtling	(Germany) Schnitzelalm Racing					DNS	13					**2**	Ret	–
–	(Germany) Julian Hanses	(Germany) Schnitzelalm Racing					3	4							–
–	(Germany) Dennis Fetzer (Germany) Hubert Haupt	(Germany) Haupt Racing Team									5	5			–
–	(Italy) Fabrizio Crestani (Austria) Ernst Kirchmayr	(Germany) racing one									6	11			–
–	(France) Loris Cabirou	(Austria) GRT Grasser Racing Team									8	Ret			–
–	(Austria) Raphael Rennhofer (Germany) Hugo Sasse	(Germany) PROsport Racing							11	13					–
–	(Germany) Hendrik Still (United Kingdom) Jamie Day	(Germany) PROsport Racing							13	11					–
–	(Germany) Moritz Wiskirchen	(Germany) Schnitzelalm Racing					DNS	13							–
–	(Germany) Coach McKansy	(Austria) HP Racing International					16	19							–
–	(Switzerland) Florian Blatter (Austria) Max Hofer	(Switzerland) Wolf-Racing									19	16			–
–	(Germany) Hermann Speck	(Germany) DB Motorsport									18	18			–
Pos.	Driver	Team	OSC (Germany)		ZAN (Netherlands)		NÜR (Germany)		SPA (Belgium)		RBR (Austria)		HOC (Germany)		Points

Key
Colour	Result
Gold	Race winner
Silver	2nd place
Bronze	3rd place
Green	Points finish
Blue	Non-points finish
Blue	Non-classified finish (NC)
Purple	Did not finish (Ret)
Black	Disqualified (DSQ)
Black	Excluded (EX)
White	Did not start (DNS)
White	Race cancelled (C)
White	Withdrew (WD)
Blank	Did not participate

**Bold** – Pole
Italics – Fastest Lap

**^{1}** – 3 Points for Pole

**^{2}** – 2 Points for P2

**^{3}** – 1 Point for P3

Notes

- † – Drivers did not finish the race but were classified, as they completed more than 75% of the race distance.

=== Teams' standings ===
Pos.	Team	Points
1	(Germany) Haupt Racing Team	329
2	(Germany) FK Performance Motorsport	261
3	(Germany) Landgraf Motorsport	231
4	(Austria) GRT Grasser Racing Team	136
5	(Germany) Walkenhorst Motorsport	130
6	(Switzerland) Fach Auto Tech	124
7	(Switzerland) Emil Frey Racing	121
8	(Germany) Team Joos by TwinBusch	100
9	(Germany) Land-Motorsport	91
10	(Germany) Paul Motorsport	80
11	(Germany) Liqui Moly Team Engstler by NordVPN	12
