= Marcel Marchewicz =

German racing driver (born 1996)

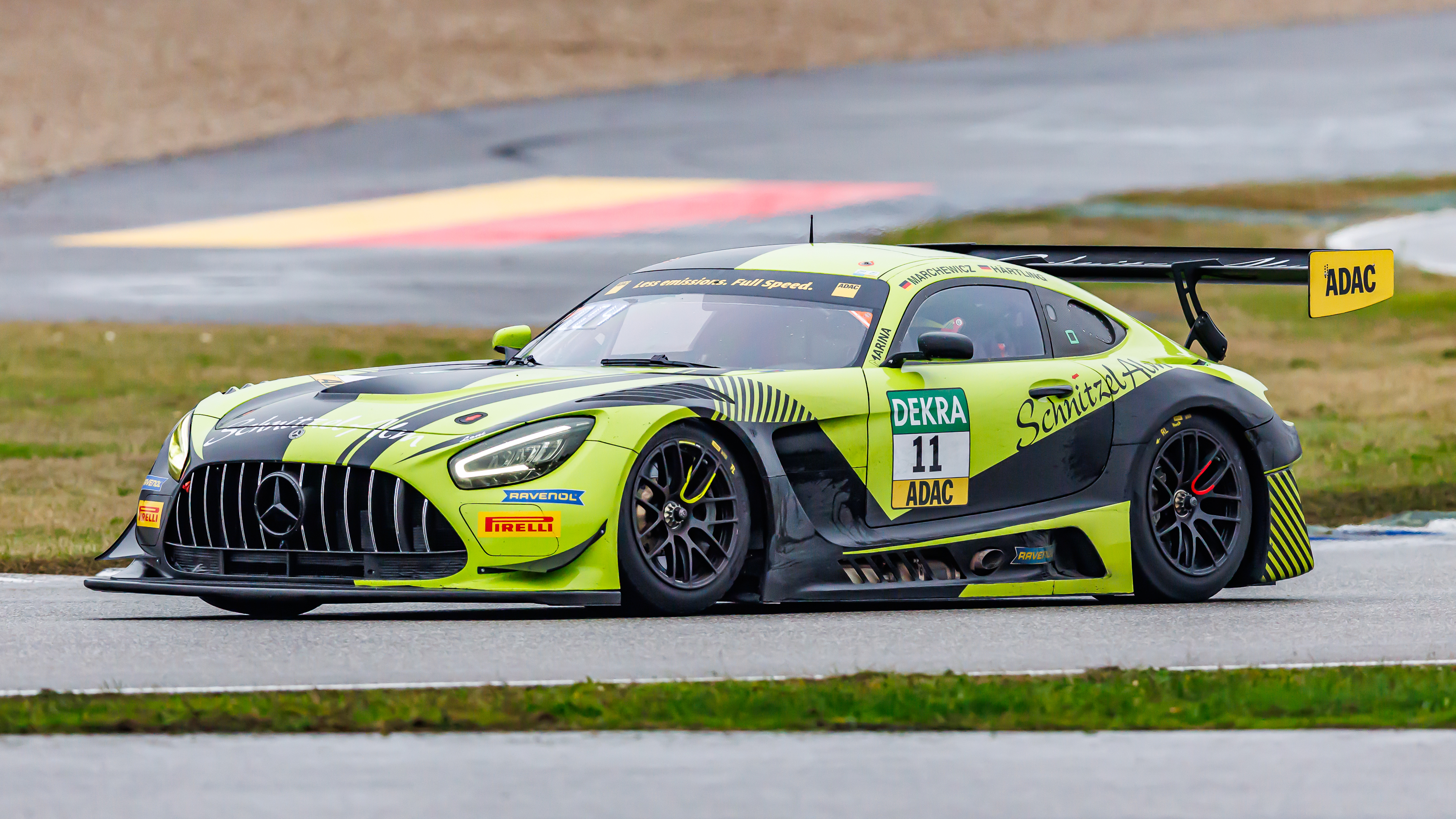
- Marchewicz in 2024
- Nationality: (Germany) German
- Born: 1 February 1996 (age 30) Schwetzingen, Germany
- Categorisation: FIA Silver

Championship titles
- 2023 2021 2020 2019: NLS – SP9 Pro; NLS – SP10; NLS – Cup 5 KTM X-Bow Battle – Rookies

Marcel Johannes Marchewicz (born 1 February 1996) is a German racing driver. A homegrown talent of Schnitzelalm Racing from karting to GT3, he is a three-time Nürburgring Langstrecken-Serie champion, most notably in 2023 in SP9 Pro.

== Career ==
Marchewicz made his car racing debut in 2019, competing in the KTM X-Bow Battle, after being discovered through the Super Racer programme on RaceRoom. In his only season in the series, Marchewicz clinched the Rookie title, as well finishing second on his ADAC GT4 Germany debut at Sachsenring and making a one-off appearance in the VLN Series for Team AVIA Sorg Rennsport.

Joining Schnitzelalm Racing on a full-time basis for 2020, Marchewicz raced a BMW M240i Racing in the one-make Cup 5 class of the Nürburgring Langstrecken-Serie. Despite not scoring a win throughout the season, Marchewicz's four podiums sealed him the Cup 5 title in his rookie year. Continuing with them for his step-up to GT4 machinery in 2021, Marchewicz won seven of eight starts in SP10 to secure his second NLS class title in as many years. During 2021, Marchewicz also won the 24 Hours of Nürburgring in SP10, as well as taking victory in a one-off DTM Trophy appearance at the Nürburgring with the team's Mercedes-AMG GT4. Towards the end of the year, Marchewicz also made his debut in GT3 machinery, competing for Mercedes-aligned HWA Team at NLS8.

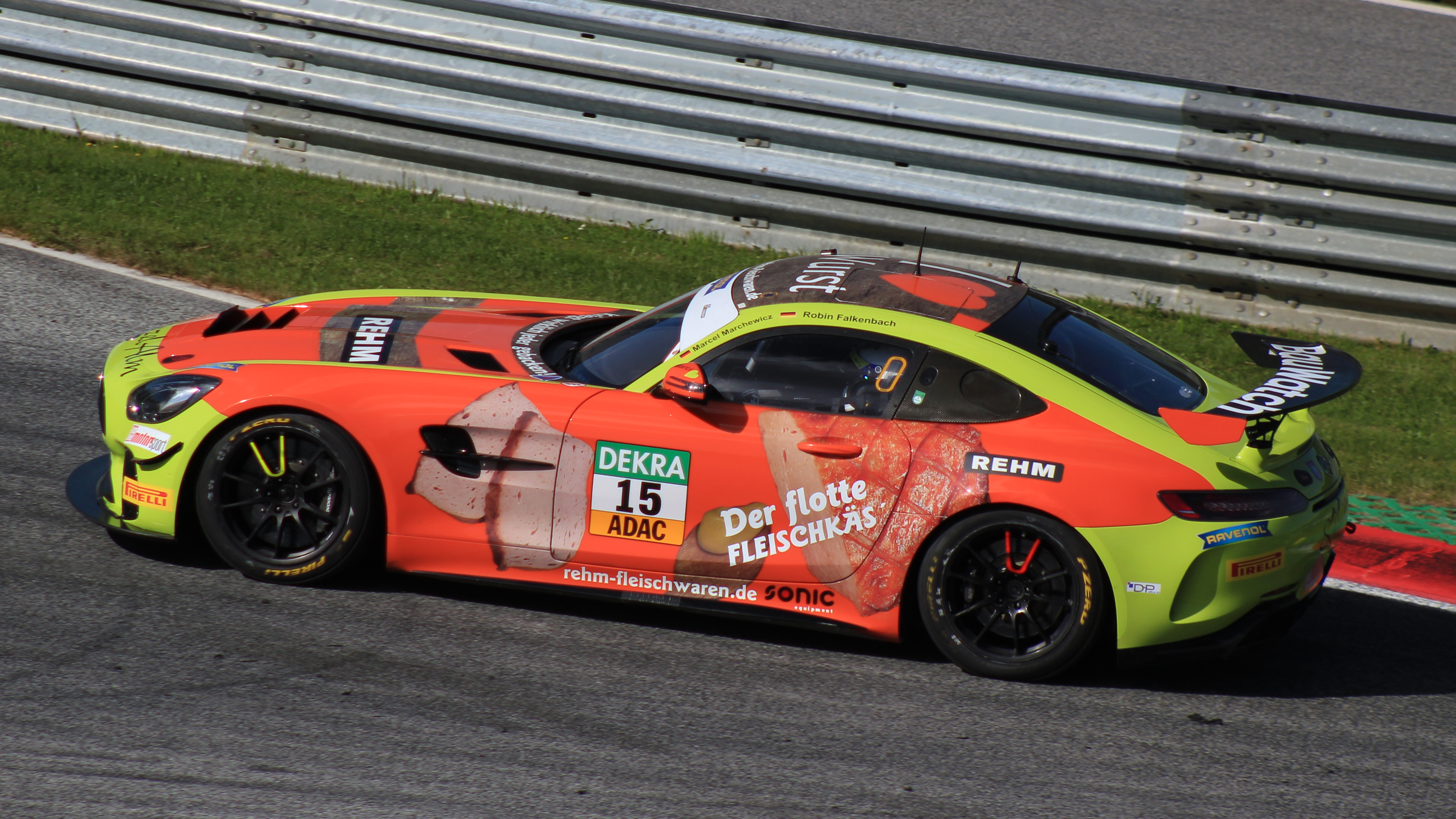
Marchewicz driving for Schnitzelalm at the Red Bull Ring in ADAC GT4 in 2022.

Continuing in GT4 machinery for 2022, Marchewicz remained with Schnitzelalm to contest the majority of the ADAC GT4 Germany season. Competing in four out of six rounds, Marchewicz scored a win and a second place at the Nürburgring en route to a 17th-place points finish. During 2022, Marchewicz also raced with the team on a part-time basis in the Nürburgring Langstrecken-Serie's SP9 class. The following year, Marchewicz continued with Schnitzelalm for a full-season programme in the SP9 class of the NLS. In his first full season in the category, Marchewicz secured the SP9 Pro title with two podiums to his name, as well as winning both qualifier races for the 24 Hours of Nürburgring in Pro-Am. Marchewicz pulled double duty in the team's No. 10 and No. 11 Mercedes-AMG GT3 Evos at the N24, and also entered the Nürburgring and Hockenheimring rounds of the ADAC GT Masters.

During 2023, news emerged of a planned DTM debut for Schnitzelalm Racing in 2024, with team principal Thomas Angerer confirming talks with "various manufacturers" and announcing Marchewicz as first driver. However, the entry was later postponed amid "health reasons" for Angerer, and the plans were never revived.

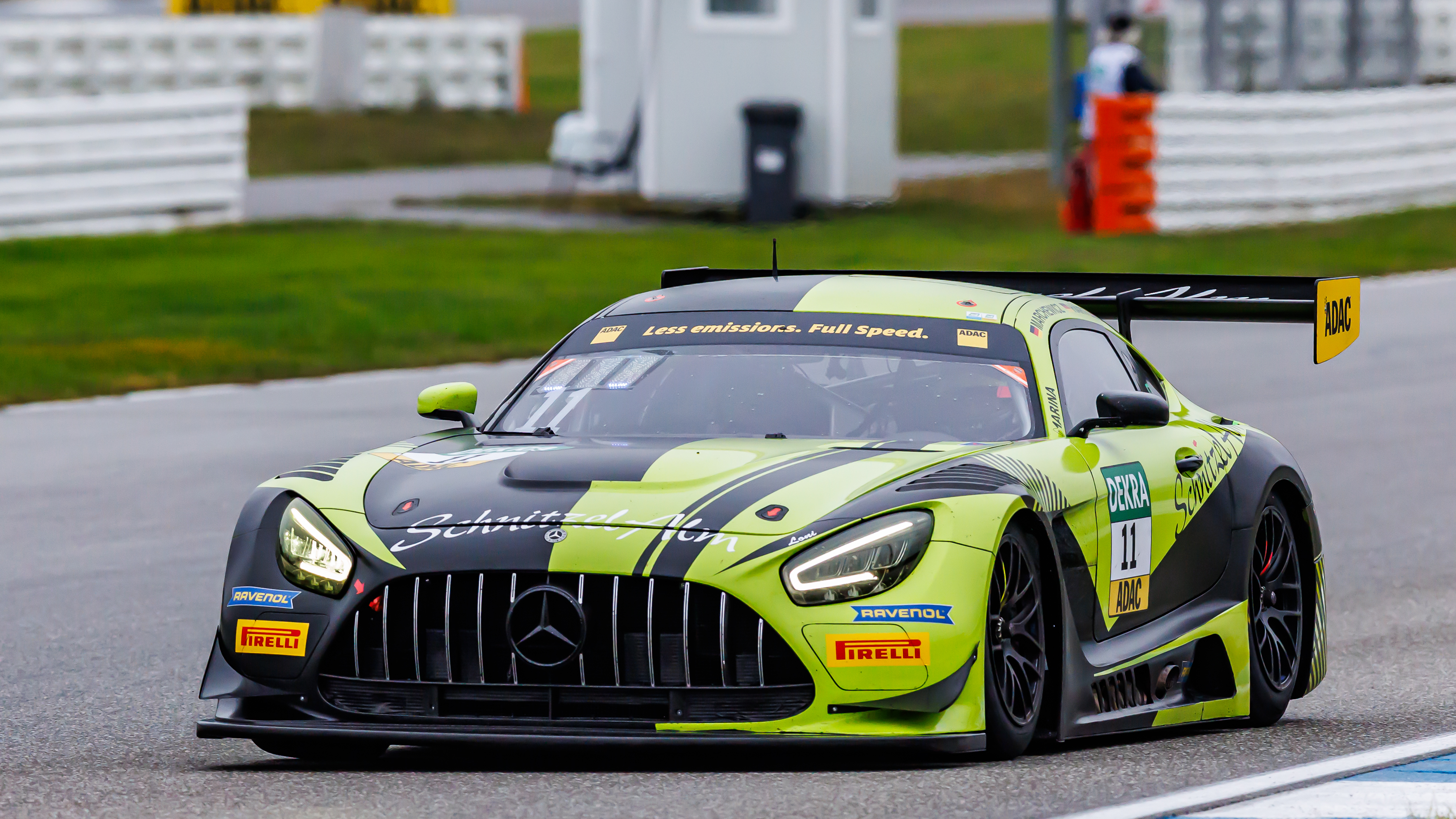
Marchewicz's Schnitzelalm Mercedes-AMG GT3 Evo at Hockenheim in 2024.

After a campaign in the 2024 GT4 Winter Series, which yielded four wins and a fourth-place points finish in the Pro standings, Marchewicz continued with Schnitzelalm for a fourth appearance at the 24 Hours of Nürburgring, finishing second in SP9 Pro-Am. During 2024, Marchewicz also made a handful of appearances in ADAC GT Masters with the team, most notably qualifying on pole at the Hockenheimring and finishing second in race one. After racing at the 2025 24 Hours of Nürburgring for Aston Martin-fielding PROsport Racing in SP8T, Marchewicz returned to the event a year later with Reiter Engineering in their KTM X-Bow GTX. During 2026, Marchewicz also reunited with SR Motorsport by Schnitzelalm to race at the Monza round of the GT4 European Series.

== Racing record ==
=== Racing career summary ===
Season	Series	Team	Races	Wins	Poles	F/Laps	Podiums	Points	Position
2019	KTM X-Bow Battle – Rookies		10	4	4	0	9		**1st**
2019	ADAC GT4 Germany	Valvoline-Reiter	2	0	0	0	1	0	NC†
2019	VLN Series – Cup 5	Team AVIA Sorg Rennsport	1	0	0	0	0	5.31	74th
2020	Nürburgring Langstrecken-Serie – Cup 5	Schnitzelalm Racing	5	0	0	0	4	39.4	**1st**
2020	24 Hours of Nürburgring – Cup 5	Schnitzelalm Racing	1	0	0	0	1	—N/a	**3rd**
2021	Nürburgring Langstrecken-Serie – SP10	Schnitzelalm Racing	8	7	6	0	8	62.46	**1st**
2021	24 Hours of Nürburgring – SP10	Schnitzelalm Racing	1	1	0	0	1	—N/a	**1st**
2021	DTM Trophy	Schnitzelalm Racing	2	1	0	0	1	0	NC†
2021	Nürburgring Langstrecken-Serie – SP9 Pro-Am	HWA Team	1	0	0	0	0	3.18	16th
2022	Nürburgring Langstrecken-Serie – SP9	Schnitzelalm Racing	5	0	0	0	0	0	NC
2022	ADAC GT4 Germany	Schnitzelalm Racing	8	1	0	0	2	60	17th
2022	Nürburgring Langstrecken-Serie – SP10	Schnitzelalm Racing	1	0	0	0	0	0	NC
2023	Nürburgring Langstrecken-Serie – SP9 Pro	Schnitzelalm Racing	7	0	0	0	2	28	**1st**
2023	Nürburgring Langstrecken-Serie – SP9 Pro-Am	Schnitzelalm Racing	1	0	0	0	0	0	NC†
2023	24 Hours of Nürburgring – SP9 Pro-Am	Schnitzelalm Racing	1	0	0	0	0	—N/a	DNF
2023	Nürburgring Langstrecken-Serie – BMW M240i	Schnitzelalm Racing	3	1	0	0	2	11	15th
2023	ADAC GT Masters	Schnitzelalm Racing	4	0	0	0	0	37	16th
2024	GT4 Winter Series – Pro	Schnitzelalm Racing	15	4	1	2	11	86.45	4th
2024	Nürburgring Langstrecken-Serie – SP9 Pro-Am	Schnitzelalm Racing	2	0	0	0	0	0	NC†
2024	24 Hours of Nürburgring – SP9 Pro-Am	Schnitzelalm Racing	1	0	0	0	1	—N/a	**2nd**
2024	Intercontinental GT Challenge	Schnitzelalm Racing	1	0	0	0	0	1	25th
2024	ADAC GT Masters	Schnitzelalm Racing	4	0	1	0	2	0	NC†
2025	24 Hours of Nürburgring – SP8T	PROsport Racing	1	0	0	0	0	—N/a	DNF
2026	Nürburgring Langstrecken-Serie – SP-X	Reiter Engineering	1	1	0	0	1	4	NC
2026	24 Hours of Nürburgring – SP-X	Reiter Engineering	1	0	0	0	0	—N/a	DNF
2026	GT4 European Series – Silver	SR Motorsport by Schnitzelalm	2	0	0	0	0	12	23rd

^{†} As Marchewicz was a guest driver, he was ineligible to score points.

=== Complete ADAC GT4 Germany results ===
(key) (Races in bold indicate pole position) (Races in italics indicate fastest lap)

Year	Team	Car	1	2	3	4	5	6	7	8	9	10	11	12	DC	Points
2019	Valvoline-Reiter	KTM X-Bow GT4	OSC; 1	OSC; 2	RBR; 1	RBR; 2	ZAN; 1	ZAN; 2	NÜR; 1	NÜR; 2	HOC; 1	HOC; 2	SAC; 1; 2	SAC; 2; 12	NC†	0†
2022	Schnitzelalm Racing	Mercedes-AMG GT4	OSC; 1; 7	OSC; 2; 12	RBR; 1 Ret	RBR; 2; 18	ZAN; 1	ZAN; 2	NÜR; 1; 2	NÜR; 2; 1	SAC; 1; 18	SAC; 2; 15	HOC; 1	HOC; 2	17th	60

=== Complete 24 Hours of Nürburgring results ===
Year	Team	Co-Drivers	Car	Class	Laps	Pos.	Class Pos.
2020	(Germany) Schnitzelalm Racing	(Germany) Tim Neuser (Germany) Fabio Grosse (Germany) Wilhelm Weirich	BMW M240i Racing	Cup 5	75	34th	**3rd**
2021	(Germany) Schnitzelalm Racing	(Germany) Marek Böckmann (Germany) Tim Neuser (Germany) Reinhold Renger	Mercedes-AMG GT4	SP10	54	25th	**1st**
2023	(Germany) Schnitzelalm Racing	(Germany) Marek Böckmann (Germany) Kenneth Heyer (Germany) Luca-Sandro Trefz	Mercedes-AMG GT3 Evo	SP9; Pro-Am	43	DNF	DNF
2023	(Germany) Schnitzelalm Racing	(Germany) Patrick Assenheimer (Germany) Marek Böckmann (Netherlands) Colin Caresani	Mercedes-AMG GT3 Evo	SP9; Pro-Am	75	DNF	DNF
2024	(Germany) Schnitzelalm Racing	(Germany) Jay Mo Härtling (Germany) Kenneth Heyer	Mercedes-AMG GT3 Evo	SP9; Pro-Am	49	14th	**2nd**
2025	(Germany) PROsport Racing	(Belgium) Guido Dumarey (Belgium) Maxime Dumarey (Austria) Raphael Rennhofer	Aston Martin Vantage AMR GT4	SP8T	47	DNF	DNF
2026	(Austria) Reiter Engineering	(Switzerland) Miklas Born (Germany) Arne Hoffmeister (Germany) Laurents Hörr	KTM X-Bow GTX	SP-X	42	DNF	DNF

=== Complete ADAC GT Masters results ===
(key) (Races in bold indicate pole position) (Races in italics indicate fastest lap)

Year	Team	Car	1	2	3	4	5	6	7	8	9	10	11	12	DC	Points
2023	Schnitzelalm Racing	Mercedes-AMG GT3 Evo	HOC; 1	HOC; 2	NOR; 1	NOR; 2	NÜR; 1; 11	NÜR; 2; 5	SAC; 1	SAC; 2	RBR; 1	RBR; 2	HOC; 1; 6	HOC; 2; 5	16th	37
2024	Schnitzelalm Racing	Mercedes-AMG GT3 Evo	OSC; 1	OSC; 2	ZAN; 1	ZAN; 2	NÜR; 1; 3	NÜR; 2; 4	SPA; 1	SPA; 2	RBR; 1	RBR; 2	**HOC**; **1**; 2	HOC; 2 Ret	NC†	0†
