= Hugo Sasse =

German racing driver (born 2004)

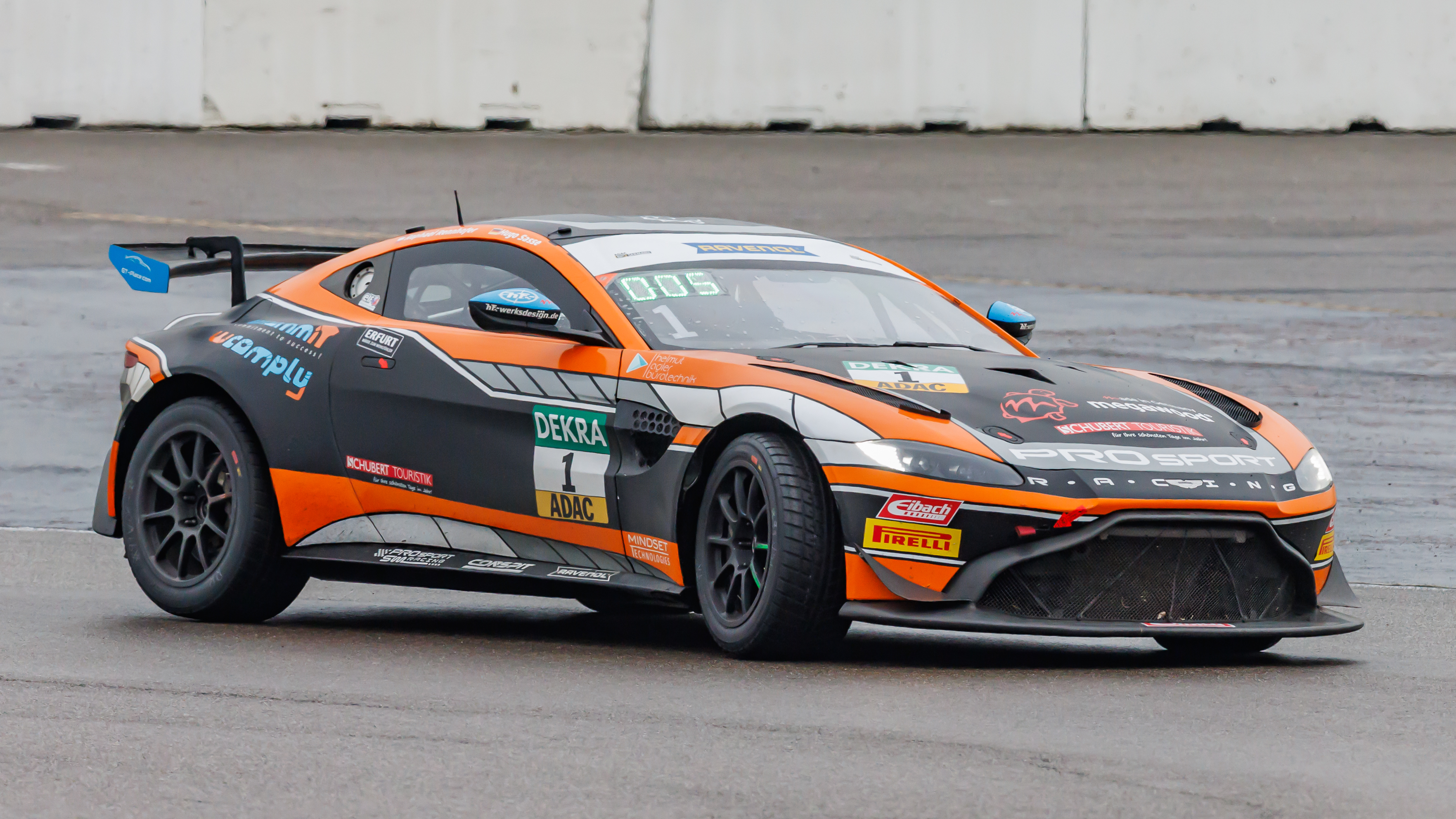
- Sasse in 2024
- Nationality: (Germany) German
- Born: 18 April 2004 (age 22) Aschersleben, Germany
- Categorisation: FIA Silver

Championship titles
- 2022–2023: ADAC GT4 Germany

Hugo Sasse (born 18 April 2004) is a German racing driver. He is a two-time ADAC GT4 Germany champion for PROsport Racing.

== Career ==
Sasse began karting in 2012, competing until 2020. Racing in Europe throughout his karting career, Sasse most notably finished runner-up in the OK-J class Deutsche Kart-Meisterschaft in 2017, before repeating the same fate in the OK class in 2018 and 2019. In Germany, Sasse also finished runner-up in ADAC Kart Masters in 2015 and 2016 in the Bambini and OK-J classes, and the 2013 ADAC Kart Bundesendlauf in the Bambini Gazelle class.

Sasse made his car racing debut in 2020, joining T3 Motorsport to race in ADAC GT4 Germany alongside Dominique Schaak for the first round and Will Tregurtha for the remaining rounds. In his maiden season in the series, Sasse scored his first podium by finishing third at Sachsenring, before scoring further podiums at Lausitzring and Oschersleben as he ended his rookie year eighth in the standings.

Remaining with T3 Motorsport for 2021, Sasse stepped up to ADAC GT Masters alongside Maximilian Paul. Racing with the team through the first four rounds before moving to GRT Grasser Racing Team for the final three rounds, Sasse scored a best result of eighth at Hockenheimring in his only full-time season in the series. During 2021, Sasse also competed in the final three rounds of the ADAC GT4 Germany season with PROsport Racing, in which he scored three wins alongside Mike David Ortmann.

Sasse stayed with PROsport Racing for 2022, partnering up with Ortmann for his second full-time season in ADAC GT4 Germany and his first in GT4 European Series. In the former, the pair won both races at Zandvoort and Sachsenring en route to their first ADAC GT4 title. In the latter, the duo won both races at Le Castellet and the season-ending race at Barcelona to end the year third in the Silver Cup standings.

Staying alongside Ortmann and remaining with PROsport Racing for 2023, Sasse returned to ADAC GT4 Germany to defend his title. Starting off the season with a win at Oschersleben, Sasse then won at the Nürburgring and both Sachsenring races, on his way to his second consecutive ADAC GT4 Germany title.

In 2024, Sasse returned to PROsport Racing and mainly competed in GT4 European Series alongside Raphael Rennhofer, winning at Le Castellet and finishing on the podium at Spa, before the team left ahead of the Monza over Balance of Performance complaints. Returning to ADAC GT4 Germany for a one-off appearance at the season-ending round at Hockenheimring, Sasse won race one and finished second in race two.

Staying with PROsport Racing for 2025, Sasse returned to ADAC GT4 Germany for his fourth full-time season in the series. Driving alongside Roman Fellner-Feldegg, Sasse qualified on pole at Oschersleben before finishing third and second in the two races to kick off the season. In the following five rounds, Sasse qualified on pole again at Sachsenring, and scored his third and final podium of the season at Hockenheimring en route to a ninth-place points finish.

== Karting record ==
=== Karting career summary ===
Season	Series	Team	Position
2012	ADAC Kart Bundesendlauf – Bambini Gazelle		5th
2013	ADAC Kart Bundesendlauf – Bambini Gazelle		2nd
2014	ADAC Kart Bundesendlauf – Bambini		4th
2014	ADAC Kart Masters – Bambini		9th
2015	Winterpokal Kerpen – Bambini		4th
2015	ADAC Kart Bundesendlauf – Bambini		3rd
2015	ADAC Kart Masters – Bambini		2nd
2016	ADAC Kart Masters – OK-J		2nd
2017	WSK Super Master Series – OK-J	CRG Racing Team	20th
2017	Andrea Margutti Trophy – OK-J	CRG Racing Team	17th
2017	Karting European Championship – OK-J	CRG Racing Team	11th
2017	Karting World Championship – OK-J	CRG Racing Team	NC
2017	WSK Final Cup – OK-J	CRG Racing Team	8th
2017	Deutsche Kart-Meisterschaft – OK-J	CRG TB Racing Team	2nd
2017	ADAC Kart Masters – OK-J		3rd
2018	WSK Super Master Series – OK-J	TB Racing Team	35th
2018	South Garda Winter Cup – OK-J	TB Racing Team	20th
2018	Andrea Margutti Trophy – OK	TB Racing Team	20th
2018	WSK Super Master Series – OK	TB Racing Team	31st
2018	Deutsche Kart-Meisterschaft – OK	TB Racing Team	2nd
2018	Karting European Championship – OK	TB Racing Team	17th
2018	Karting World Championship – OK	TB Racing Team	NC
2018	WSK Final Cup – OK	TB Racing Team	28th
2019	South Garda Winter Cup – OK	TB Racing Team	10th
2019	WSK Super Master Series – OK	TB Racing Team	27th
2019	Deutsche Kart-Meisterschaft – OK	TB Racing Team	2nd
2019	WSK Euro Series – OK	TB Racing Team; Parolin Racing Kart (Note: Sasse competed for TB Racing Team in round 1 and for Parolin Racing Kart in round 3.)	16th
2019	Karting European Championship – OK	TB Racing Team; Parolin Racing Kart (Note: Sasse competed for TB Racing Team in round 1 and for Parolin Racing Kart in rounds 2–4.)	34th
2019	Championnat de France – OK	Parolin Racing Kart	19th
2019	Karting World Championship – OK	Parolin Racing Kart	19th
2019	WSK Open Cup – OK	Parolin Racing Kart	11th
2019	WSK Final Cup – OK	Parolin Racing Kart	8th
2019	Italian Karting Championship – OK		9th
2020	WSK Champions Cup – OK	Parolin Racing Kart	33rd
2020	WSK Super Master Series – OK	Parolin Racing Kart	41st
2020	South Garda Winter Cup – OK	Parolin Racing Kart	NC
2020	WSK Euro Series – OK	Parolin Racing Kart	40th
2020	Karting European Championship – OK	Parolin Racing Kart	65th

== Racing record ==
=== Racing career summary ===
Season	Series	Team	Races	Wins	Poles	F/Laps	Podiums	Points	Position
2020	ADAC GT4 Germany	T3-HRT-Motorsport	12	0	0	0	3	97	8th
2020	GT60 Race – Pro	T3-HRT-Motorsport	1	0	0	0	1	6.25	5th
2020	GTC Race – Semi-Pro	T3-HRT-Motorsport	1	1	0	0	1	8.75	4th
2021	ADAC GT Masters	T3 Motorsport	8	0	0	0	0	17	32nd
2021	ADAC GT Masters	GRT Grasser Racing Team	6	0	0	0	0	17	32nd
2021	ADAC GT4 Germany	PROsport Racing	6	3	1	1	3	0	NC†
2022	24H GT Series – GT4	PROsport Racing AMR	1	0	0	0	0	20	NC
2022	ADAC GT4 Germany	PROsport Racing	12	4	3	0	5	185	**1st**
2022	GT4 European Series – Silver	PROsport Racing	10	3	0	0	6	142	**3rd**
2022	Nürburgring Langstrecken-Serie – V5	PROsport Racing	3	0	0	0	0	0	NC
2022	NASCAR Whelen Euro Series – EuroNASCAR 2	Marko Stipp Motorsport	0	0	0	0	0	8	42nd
2023	ADAC GT4 Germany	PROsport Racing	12	4	2	0	7	199	**1st**
2023	Nürburgring Langstrecken-Serie – SP10	PROsport Racing	2	0	0	0	1	0	NC
2023	24 Hours of Nürburgring – SP10	PROsport Racing	1	0	0	0	0	—N/a	4th
2024	GT4 European Series – Silver	PROsport Racing	8	1	0	0	2	46	11th
2024	24 Hours of Nürburgring – SP9 Pro	PROsport Racing	1	0	0	0	0	—N/a	DNF
2024	ADAC GT Masters	PROsport Racing	2	0	0	0	0	0	NC†
2024	ADAC GT4 Germany	PROsport Racing	2	1	1	0	2	0	NC†
2025	ADAC GT4 Germany	PROsport Racing	12	0	2	1	3	87	9th
2025	Nürburgring Langstrecken-Serie – SP7	PROsport Racing	1	0	0	0	0	0	NC
2026	Nürburgring Langstrecken-Serie – SP9 Am	PROsport-Racing	1	0	0	0	0	0	NC
2026	Nürburgring Langstrecken-Serie – SP10 Pro-Am	PROsport-Racing	1	0	0	0	1	8	NC

^{†} As Sasse was a guest driver, he was ineligible to score points.

=== Complete ADAC GT4 Germany results ===
(key) (Races in bold indicate pole position) (Races in italics indicate fastest lap)

Year	Team	Car	1	2	3	4	5	6	7	8	9	10	11	12	Pos	Points
2020	T3-HRT-Motorsport	Audi R8 LMS GT4 Evo	NÜR; 1; 12	NÜR; 2; 17	HOC; 1; 17	HOC; 2; 5	SAC; 1; 4	SAC; 2; 3	RBR; 1; 9	RBR; 2; 18	LAU; 1 Ret	LAU; 2; 2	OSC; 1; 8	OSC; 2; 3	8th	97
2021	PROsport Racing	Aston Martin Vantage AMR GT4	OSC1; 1	OSC1; 2	RBR; 1	RBR; 2	ZAN; 1	ZAN; 2	**SAC**; **1**; 1	SAC; 2; 7	HOC; 1 Ret	HOC; 2; 9	NÜR; 1; 1	NÜR; 2; 1	NC†	0
2022	PROsport Racing	Aston Martin Vantage AMR GT4	OSC1; 1; 5	OSC1; 2; 4	RBR; 1; 10	RBR; 2 Ret	**ZAN**; **1**; 1	**ZAN**; **2**; 1	NÜR; 1; 4	NÜR; 2; 5	**SAC**; **1**; 1	SAC; 2; 1	**HOC**; **1**; 5	**HOC**; **2**; 2	1st	185
2023	PROsport Racing	Aston Martin Vantage AMR GT4	OSC1; 1 Ret	OSC1; 2; 1	ZAN; 1; 4	ZAN; 2; 5	**NÜR**; **1**; 2	NÜR; 2; 1	LAU; 1; 4	LAU; 2; 3	SAC; 1; 1	SAC; 2; 1	**HOC**; **1**; 6	HOC; 2; 3	1st	199
2024	PROsport Racing	Aston Martin Vantage AMR GT4	OSC; 1	OSC; 2	LAU; 1	LAU; 2	NOR; 1	NOR; 2	NÜR; 1	NÜR; 2	RBR; 1	RBR; 2	HOC; 1; 1	**HOC**; **2**; 2	NC†	0
2025	PROsport Racing	Aston Martin Vantage AMR GT4	**OSC**; **1**; 3	OSC; 2; 2	NOR; 1; 13	NOR; 2 Ret	NÜR; 1 Ret	NÜR; 2 Ret	SAC; 1; 10	**SAC**; **2**; 12	RBR; 1; 6	RBR; 2 Ret	HOC; 1; 7	HOC; 2; 3	9th	87

^{†} As Sasse was a guest driver, he was ineligible for points.

=== Complete ADAC GT Masters results ===
(key) (Races in bold indicate pole position) (Races in italics indicate fastest lap)

Year	Team	Car	1	2	3	4	5	6	7	8	9	10	11	12	13	14	DC	Points
2021	T3 Motorsport	Lamborghini Huracán GT3 Evo	OSC; 1; 20	OSC; 2; 15	RBR; 1; 18	RBR; 2; 18	ZAN; 1; 15	ZAN; 2; 21	LAU; 1; 11	LAU; 2 Ret							22nd	37
2021	GRT Grasser Racing Team	Lamborghini Huracán GT3 Evo									SAC; 1; 19	SAC; 2; 14	HOC; 1; 8	HOC; 2; 16	NÜR; 1 Ret	NÜR; 2 Ret	22nd	37
2024	PROsport Racing	Aston Martin Vantage AMR GT3	OSC; 1	OSC; 2	ZAN; 1	ZAN; 2	NÜR; 1	NÜR; 2	SPA; 1; 11	SPA; 2; 13	RBR; 1	RBR; 2	HOC; 1	HOC; 2			NC	0

=== Complete GT4 European Series results ===
(key) (Races in bold indicate pole position) (Races in italics indicate fastest lap)

Year	Team	Car	Class	1	2	3	4	5	6	7	8	9	10	11	12	Pos	Points
2022	PROsport Racing	Aston Martin Vantage AMR GT4	Silver	IMO; 1 Ret	IMO; 2 DNS	LEC; 1; 1	LEC; 2; 1	MIS; 1; 14	MIS; 2 DNS	SPA; 1; 16	SPA; 2; 2	HOC; 1; 2	HOC; 2; 18	CAT; 1; 5	CAT; 2; 2	3rd	142
2024	PROsport Racing	Aston Martin Vantage AMR GT4	Silver	LEC; 1; 41†	LEC; 2; 1	MIS; 1 Ret	MIS; 2; 35†	SPA; 1; 3	SPA; 2; 7	HOC; 1; 17	HOC; 2; 12	MNZ; 1	MNZ; 2	JED; 1	JED; 2	11th	46
