= 2025 ADAC GT4 Germany =

Sports car racing series season

The 2025 ADAC GT4 Germany season was the seventh season of ADAC GT4 Germany, a sports car championship created and organised by the ADAC. The season started on 25 April at Oschersleben and finished on 5 October at the Hockenheimring.

The drivers' championship was won by Enrico Förderer and Jay Mo Härtling in a Mercedes-AMG GT4 with 194 points. The team's championship was won by AVIA W&S Motorsport with 342 points.

== Teams and drivers ==
Team	Car	No.	Drivers	Class	Rounds
(Germany) AVIA W&S Motorsport	Porsche 718 Cayman GT4 Clubsport	1	(Germany) Hendrik Still		All
(Germany) AVIA W&S Motorsport	Porsche 718 Cayman GT4 Clubsport	1	(Germany) Philipp Gogollok	J	All
(Germany) AVIA W&S Motorsport	Porsche 718 Cayman GT4 Clubsport	30	(Jamaica) Thomas Gore	J	All
(Germany) AVIA W&S Motorsport	Porsche 718 Cayman GT4 Clubsport	30	(Israel) Alon Gabbay	J	All
(Germany) AVIA W&S Motorsport	Porsche 718 Cayman GT4 Clubsport	31	(Australia) Lachlan Robinson	J	All
(Germany) AVIA W&S Motorsport	Porsche 718 Cayman GT4 Clubsport	31	(Denmark) Oskar Lind Kristensen	J	All
(Germany) AVIA W&S Motorsport	Porsche 718 Cayman GT4 Clubsport	32	(Germany) Maximilian Schreyer	J R	All
(Germany) AVIA W&S Motorsport	Porsche 718 Cayman GT4 Clubsport	32	(Germany) Luciano Schneider	J	All
(Germany) COSY Racing by ESM	Aston Martin Vantage AMR GT4	4	(Germany) Jan Philipp Springob		3–6
(Germany) COSY Racing by ESM	Aston Martin Vantage AMR GT4	4	(Norway) Storm Gjerdrum		3–6
(Germany) BWT Mücke Motorsport	Mercedes-AMG GT4	8	(Switzerland) Julien Apothéloz	J	All
(Germany) BWT Mücke Motorsport	Mercedes-AMG GT4	8	(Italy) Luca Bosco	J	1–4
(Germany) BWT Mücke Motorsport	Mercedes-AMG GT4	8	(United Kingdom) Alex Connor	J	5–6
(Germany) BWT Mücke Motorsport	Mercedes-AMG GT4	18	(Denmark) Tobias Bille Clausen	J R	All
(Germany) BWT Mücke Motorsport	Mercedes-AMG GT4	18	(Sweden) Axel Bengtsson	J R	All
(Austria) Razoon - more than Racing	Porsche 718 Cayman GT4 Clubsport	10	(Germany) Denny Berndt	J	All
(Austria) Razoon - more than Racing	Porsche 718 Cayman GT4 Clubsport	10	(Germany) Max Rosam	J	All
(Austria) Razoon - more than Racing	Porsche 718 Cayman GT4 Clubsport	20	(Austria) Daniel Drexel		All
(Austria) Razoon - more than Racing	Porsche 718 Cayman GT4 Clubsport	20	(Germany) Luca Link	J	1–4
(Austria) Razoon - more than Racing	Porsche 718 Cayman GT4 Clubsport	20	(Germany) Nikolas Gebhardt	J	5
(Austria) Razoon - more than Racing	Porsche 718 Cayman GT4 Clubsport	20	(Slovenia) Mark Kastelic	J	6
(Germany) SR Motorsport by Schnitzelalm Racing	Mercedes-AMG GT4	11	(Germany) Enrico Förderer	J	All
(Germany) SR Motorsport by Schnitzelalm Racing	Mercedes-AMG GT4	11	(Germany) Jay Mo Härtling	J	All
(Germany) SR Motorsport by Schnitzelalm Racing	Mercedes-AMG GT4	12	(Germany) Joel Mesch	J	All
(Germany) SR Motorsport by Schnitzelalm Racing	Mercedes-AMG GT4	12	(Germany) Cedric Fuchs	J R	All
(Germany) Teichmann Racing	Toyota GR Supra GT4	13	(Germany) Roland Froese		3
(Germany) Teichmann Racing	Toyota GR Supra GT4	13	(Germany) Maximilian Schleimer		3
(Germany) PROsport Racing	Aston Martin Vantage AMR GT4	17	(Germany) Anton Paul Abée		All
(Germany) PROsport Racing	Aston Martin Vantage AMR GT4	17	(Germany) Marek Böckmann		All
(Germany) PROsport Racing	Aston Martin Vantage AMR GT4	19	(Germany) Hugo Sasse		All
(Germany) PROsport Racing	Aston Martin Vantage AMR GT4	19	(Germany) Roman Fellner-Feldegg	J R	All
(Germany) FK Performance Motorsport	BMW M4 GT4 Evo (G82)	21	(Italy) Gabriele Piana		All
(Germany) FK Performance Motorsport	BMW M4 GT4 Evo (G82)	21	(Turkey) Berkay Besler		All
(Germany) FK Performance Motorsport	BMW M4 GT4 Evo (G82)	22	(Germany) Niels Tröger	J	All
(Germany) FK Performance Motorsport	BMW M4 GT4 Evo (G82)	22	(Denmark) Andreas Jochimsen		All
(Germany) FK Performance Motorsport	BMW M4 GT4 Evo (G82)	23	(Finland) Benjamin Sylvestersson	J	All
(Germany) FK Performance Motorsport	BMW M4 GT4 Evo (G82)	23	(South Africa) Joseph Ellerine	J	All
(Germany) FK Performance Motorsport	BMW M4 GT4 Evo (G82)	24	(Netherlands) Gianni van de Craats	J	6
(Germany) FK Performance Motorsport	BMW M4 GT4 Evo (G82)	24	(Netherlands) Valentijn Greven	J	6
(Austria) Razoon - xAutomotive Racing	BMW M4 GT4 Evo (G82)	40	(Germany) Laurenz Rühl	J R	All
(Austria) Razoon - xAutomotive Racing	BMW M4 GT4 Evo (G82)	40	(Austria) Luis Moser	J R	1–2
(Austria) Razoon - xAutomotive Racing	BMW M4 GT4 Evo (G82)	40	(Germany) Maximilian Tarillion	J	3
(Austria) Razoon - xAutomotive Racing	BMW M4 GT4 Evo (G82)	40	(Netherlands) Rick Bouthoorn		4
(Austria) Razoon - xAutomotive Racing	BMW M4 GT4 Evo (G82)	40	(Canada) Damon Surzyshyn		5–6
(Austria) Razoon - xAutomotive Racing	BMW M4 GT4 Evo (G82)	70	(Denmark) Victor Nielsen	J R	1–4
(Austria) Razoon - xAutomotive Racing	BMW M4 GT4 Evo (G82)	70	(Germany) Maximilian Tarillion	J	1–2
(Austria) Razoon - xAutomotive Racing	BMW M4 GT4 Evo (G82)	70	(Austria) Luis Moser	J R	3–5
(Austria) Razoon - xAutomotive Racing	BMW M4 GT4 Evo (G82)	70	(Germany) Luca Link	J	5
(Germany) ME Motorsport	BMW M4 GT4 Evo (G82)	66	(Germany) Philip Wiskirchen		All
(Germany) ME Motorsport	BMW M4 GT4 Evo (G82)	66	(Germany) Tim Reiter		All
(Germany) ME Motorsport	BMW M4 GT4 Evo (G82)	77	(Germany) Thomas Rackl	J	All
(Germany) ME Motorsport	BMW M4 GT4 Evo (G82)	77	(Germany) Linus Hahne	J	All
(Austria) Wimmer Werk Motorsport	Porsche 718 Cayman GT4 Clubsport	91	(United Kingdom) Oskar Dix	J R	All
(Austria) Wimmer Werk Motorsport	Porsche 718 Cayman GT4 Clubsport	91	(Germany) Egor Litvinenko	J	All
(Austria) Wimmer Werk Motorsport	Porsche 718 Cayman GT4 Clubsport	92	(Austria) Raphael Rennhofer	J	All
(Austria) Wimmer Werk Motorsport	Porsche 718 Cayman GT4 Clubsport	92	(Norway) Emil Heyerdahl	J	All

Icon	Class
J	Junior
R	Rookie
	Guest Starter

== Calendar ==
Round	Circuit	Date	Map of circuit locations	
1	Motorsport Arena Oschersleben, Oschersleben, Germany	25–27 April	2025 ADAC GT4 Germany is located in Germany	2025 ADAC GT4 Germany is located in Austria
2	Norisring, Nuremberg, Germany	4–6 July	2025 ADAC GT4 Germany is located in Germany	2025 ADAC GT4 Germany is located in Austria
3	Nürburgring, Nürburg, Germany	8–10 August	2025 ADAC GT4 Germany is located in Germany	2025 ADAC GT4 Germany is located in Austria
4	Sachsenring, Hohenstein-Ernstthal, Germany	22–24 August	2025 ADAC GT4 Germany is located in Germany	2025 ADAC GT4 Germany is located in Austria
5	Red Bull Ring, Spielberg, Austria	12–14 September	2025 ADAC GT4 Germany is located in Germany	2025 ADAC GT4 Germany is located in Austria
6	Hockenheimring, Hockenheim, Germany	3–5 October	2025 ADAC GT4 Germany is located in Germany	2025 ADAC GT4 Germany is located in Austria

== Results and standings ==
=== Race results ===
Round		Circuit	Date	Pole position	Fastest lap	Race winner
1	R1	(Germany) Oschersleben	26 April	(Germany) #19 PROSport Racing	(Germany) #12 SR Motorsport by Schnitzelalm Racing	(Germany) #11 SR Motorsport by Schnitzelalm Racing
1	R1	(Germany) Oschersleben	26 April	(Germany) Hugo Sasse (Germany) Roman Fellner-Feldegg	(Germany) Joel Mesch	(Germany) Enrico Förderer (Germany) Jay Mo Härtling
1	R2	(Germany) Oschersleben	27 April	(Germany) #11 SR Motorsport by Schnitzelalm Racing	(Germany) #11 SR Motorsport by Schnitzelalm Racing	(Germany) #11 SR Motorsport by Schnitzelalm Racing
1	R2	(Germany) Oschersleben	27 April	(Germany) Enrico Förderer (Germany) Jay Mo Härtling	(Germany) Jay Mo Härtling	(Germany) Enrico Förderer (Germany) Jay Mo Härtling
2	R1	(Germany) Norisring	5 July	(Germany) #11 SR Motorsport by Schnitzelalm Racing	(Germany) #11 SR Motorsport by Schnitzelalm Racing	(Germany) #11 SR Motorsport by Schnitzelalm Racing
2	R1	(Germany) Norisring	5 July	(Germany) Enrico Förderer (Germany) Jay Mo Härtling	(Germany) Enrico Förderer	(Germany) Enrico Förderer (Germany) Jay Mo Härtling
2	R2	(Germany) Norisring	6 July	(Germany) #11 SR Motorsport by Schnitzelalm Racing	(Germany) #11 SR Motorsport by Schnitzelalm Racing	(Germany) #11 SR Motorsport by Schnitzelalm Racing
2	R2	(Germany) Norisring	6 July	(Germany) Enrico Förderer (Germany) Jay Mo Härtling	(Germany) Jay Mo Härtling	(Germany) Enrico Förderer (Germany) Jay Mo Härtling
3	R1	(Germany) Nürburgring	9 August	(Germany) #11 SR Motorsport by Schnitzelalm Racing	(Germany) #4 COSY Racing By ESM	(Germany) #1 AVIA W&S Motorsport
3	R1	(Germany) Nürburgring	9 August	(Germany) Enrico Förderer (Germany) Jay Mo Härtling	(Germany) Jan Philipp Springob	(Germany) Hendrik Still (Germany) Philipp Gogollok
3	R2	(Germany) Nürburgring	10 August	(Germany) #17 PROSport Racing	(Germany) #21 FK Performance Motorsport	(Germany) #21 FK Performance Motorsport
3	R2	(Germany) Nürburgring	10 August	(Germany) Anton Paul Abée (Germany) Marek Böckmann	(Italy) Gabriele Piana	(Italy) Gabriele Piana (Turkey) Berkay Besler
4	R1	(Germany) Sachsenring	23 August	(Germany) #4 COSY Racing By ESM	(Austria) #10 Razoon - more than Racing	(Austria) #10 Razoon - more than Racing
4	R1	(Germany) Sachsenring	23 August	(Germany) Jan Philipp Springob (Norway) Storm Gjerdrum	(Germany) Denny Berndt	(Germany) Max Rosam (Germany) Denny Berndt
4	R2	(Germany) Sachsenring	24 August	(Germany) #19 PROSport Racing	(Germany) #21 FK Performance Motorsport	(Germany) #21 FK Performance Motorsport
4	R2	(Germany) Sachsenring	24 August	(Germany) Hugo Sasse (Germany) Roman Fellner-Feldegg	(Italy) Gabriele Piana	(Italy) Gabriele Piana (Turkey) Berkay Besler
5	R1	(Austria) Red Bull Ring	13 September	(Germany) #4 COSY Racing By ESM	(Germany) #4 COSY Racing By ESM	(Germany) #1 AVIA W&S Motorsport
5	R1	(Austria) Red Bull Ring	13 September	(Germany) Jan Philipp Springob (Norway) Storm Gjerdrum	(Germany) Jan Philipp Springob	(Germany) Hendrik Still (Germany) Philipp Gogollok
5	R2	(Austria) Red Bull Ring	14 September	(Germany) #11 SR Motorsport by Schnitzelalm Racing	(Germany) #31 AVIA W&S Motorsport	(Germany) #31 AVIA W&S Motorsport
5	R2	(Austria) Red Bull Ring	14 September	(Germany) Enrico Förderer (Germany) Jay Mo Härtling	(Denmark) Oskar Lind Kristensen	(Australia) Lachlan Robinson (Denmark) Oskar Lind Kristensen
6	R1	(Germany) Hockenheim	4 October	(Germany) #31 AVIA W&S Motorsport	(Germany) #1 AVIA W&S Motorsport	(Austria) #92 Wimmer Werk Motorsport
6	R1	(Germany) Hockenheim	4 October	(Australia) Lachlan Robinson (Denmark) Oskar Lind Kristensen	(Germany) Hendrik Still	(Austria) Raphael Rennhofer (Norway) Emil Heyerdahl
6	R2	(Germany) Hockenheim	5 October	(Germany) #1 AVIA W&S Motorsport	(Germany) #19 PROSport Racing	(Germany) #1 AVIA W&S Motorsport
6	R2	(Germany) Hockenheim	5 October	(Germany) Hendrik Still (Germany) Philipp Gogollok	(Germany) Hugo Sasse	(Germany) Hendrik Still (Germany) Philipp Gogollok

== Championship standings ==
=== Points system ===
Scoring system

Championship points are awarded for the first fifteen positions in each race. Entries are required to complete 75% of the winning car's race distance in order to be classified and earn points. Individual drivers are required to participate for a minimum of 25 minutes in order to earn championship points in any race.

Position	**1st**	**2nd**	**3rd**	**4th**	**5th**	**6th**	**7th**	**8th**	**9th**	**10th**	**11th**	**12th**	**13th**	**14th**	**15th**
Points	25	20	16	13	11	10	9	8	7	6	5	4	3	2	1

=== Drivers' standings ===
Pos.	Driver	OSC (Germany)		NOR (Germany)		NÜR (Germany)		SAC (Germany)		RBR (Austria)		HOC (Germany)		Points
1	(Germany) Enrico Förderer (Germany) Jay Mo Härtling	1	**1**	**1**	**1**	**5**	3	Ret	7	8	**3**	4	2	194
2	(Germany) Hendrik Still (Germany) Philipp Gogollok	5	5	5	14	1	Ret	2	5	1	5	3	**1**	168
3	(Turkey) Berkay Besler (Italy) Gabriele Piana	6	8	2	2	4	1	13	1	7	11	8	6	159
4	(Norway) Emil Heyerdahl (Austria) Raphael Rennhofer	2	3	7	10	8	4	4	6	4	4	1	DSQ	150
5	(Denmark) Oskar Lind Kristensen (Australia) Lachlan Robinson	9	Ret	Ret	3	Ret	9	11	3	5	1	**2**	7	119
6	(Germany) Max Rosam (Germany) Denny Berndt	4	10	3	4	14	6	1	20	9	13	5	Ret	109
7	(Germany) Linus Hahne (Germany) Thomas Rackl	7	7	4	9	2	5	DNF	2	17	7	22	5	109
8	(Jamaica) Thomas Gore (Israel) Alon Gabbay	8	Ret	14	17	12	7	3	10	2	2	12	4	104
9	(Germany) Hugo Sasse (Germany) Roman Fellner-Feldegg	**3**	2	13	Ret	Ret	Ret	10	**12**	6	Ret	7	3	87
10	(Germany) Tim Reiter (Germany) Phillip Wiskirchen	Ret	Ret	8	7	3	Ret	7	4	11	Ret	11	17	68
11	(Denmark) Andreas Jochimsen (Germany) Niels Tröger	17	11	6	8	6	Ret	9	11	22	8	14	9	66
12	(Germany) Cedric Fuchs (Germany) Joel Mesch	12	4	10	5	18	12	5	8	15	Ret	18	Ret	59
13	(Germany) Marek Böckmann (Germany) Anton Paul Abée	DNS	6	18	Ret	9	**2**	18	15	14	Ret	10	Ret	49
14	(Finland) Benjamin Sylvestersson (South Africa) Joseph Ellerine	14	12	12	12	10	8	14	14	13	15	15	10	48
15	(Denmark) Victor Nielsen	10	9	19	6	11	Ret	8	9					45
16	(Austria) Luis Moser	18	15	17	15	11	Ret	8	9	12	12	17	Ret	33
17	(Switzerland) Julien Apothéloz	11	Ret	9	Ret	16	13	20	16	18	10	9	16	33
18	(Germany) Maximilian Tarillion	10	9	19	6	21	10							29
19	(Germany) Luciano Schneider (Germany) Maximilian Schreyer	15	13	Ret	Ret	17	Ret	19	13	10	6	13	Ret	29
20	(Germany) Luca Link	19	16	15	11	20	11	15	17	12	12	17	Ret	22
21	(United Kingdom) Oscar Dix (Germany) Egor Litvineko	16	Ret	16	13	15	Ret	16	19	16	9	Ret	14	19
22	(Sweden) Axel Bengtsson (Denmark) Tobias Bille Clausen	13	14	11	16	19	Ret	17	18	19	14	16	12	19
23	(Germany) Laurenz Rühl	18	15	17	15	21	10	12	Ret	21	17	21	13	18
24	(Italy) Luca Bosco	11	Ret	9	Ret	16	13	20	16					17
25	(United Kingdom) Alex Connor									18	10	9	16	16
26	(Austria) Daniel Drexel	19	16	15	11	20	11	15	17	20	16	20	15	16
27	(Netherlands) Rick Bouthoorn							12	Ret					5
27	(Canada) Damon Surzyshyn									21	17	21	13	5
28	(Slovenia) Mark Kastelic											20	15	3
29	(Germany) Nikolas Gebhardt									20	16			0
Guest drivers ineligible to score points
–	(Germany) Jan Philipp Springob (Norway) Storm Gjerdrum					7	DNS	**6**	Ret	**3**	Ret	6	8	–
–	(Netherlands) Gianni van de Craats (Netherlands) Valentijn Greven											19	11	–
–	(Germany) Roland Froese (Germany) Maximilian Schleimer					13	14							–
Pos.	Driver	OSC (Germany)		NOR (Germany)		NÜR (Germany)		SAC (Germany)		RBR (Austria)		HOC (Germany)		Points

Colour	Result
Gold	Winner
Silver	Second place
Bronze	Third place
Green	Points classification
Blue	Non-points classification
Blue	Non-classified finish (NC)
Purple	Retired, not classified (Ret)
Red	Did not qualify (DNQ)
Red	Did not pre-qualify (DNPQ)
Black	Disqualified (DSQ)
White	Did not start (DNS)
White	Withdrew (WD)
White	Race cancelled (C)
Blank	Did not practice (DNP)
Blank	Did not arrive (DNA)
Blank	Excluded (EX)

**Bold** – Pole

Italics – Fastest Lap

=== Teams' championship ===
Pos.	Team	OSC (Germany)		NOR (Germany)		NÜR (Germany)		SAC (Germany)		RBR (Austria)		HOC (Germany)		Points
1	(Germany) AVIA W&S Motorsport	5	5	5	3	1	7	2	3	1	1	2	1	342
2	(Germany) SR Motorsport by Schnitzelalm Racing	1	1	1	1	5	3	5	7	8	3	4	2	262
3	(Germany) FK Performance Motorsport	6	8	2	2	4	1	9	1	7	8	8	6	253
4	(Austria) Razoon - more than Racing (Note: The teams Razoon - more than Racing and Razoon - xAutomotive Racing compete together in the team standings as Razoon - more than Racing.)	4	10	3	4	11	6	1	9	9	12	5	13	198
5	(Germany) ME Motorsport	7	7	4	8	2	5	7	2	11	7	11	5	186
6	(Austria) Wimmer Werk Motorsport	2	3	7	10	8	4	4	6	4	4	1	14	185
7	(Germany) PROSport Racing	3	2	13	Ret	9	2	11	12	6	Ret	7	3	148
8	(Germany) BWT Mücke Motorsport	11	14	9	16	16	13	17	16	18	10	9	12	83
Guest teams ineligible to score points
–	(Germany) COSY Racing by ESM					7	Ret	6	Ret	3	Ret	6	8	–
–	(Germany) Teichmann Racing					13	14							–
