= 2024 GT Winter Series =

Multi-event motor racing championship

== Calendar ==
The calendar for the 2024 season was announced on the 26th March 2023. The 2024 GT Winter Series will run entirely on the Iberian Peninsula, with two races in Portugal, and four races in Spain.
At each circuit, the race weekend will consist of three races in total, two 30 minute races, and a single 55 minute race.

| Round | Circuit | Date | Map of circuit locations |
|---|---|---|---|
| 1 | (Portugal) Circuito do Estoril, Estoril | 13–14 January | 2024 GT Winter Series (Iberia) |
| 2 | (Portugal) Algarve International Circuit, Portimão | 20–21 January | 2024 GT Winter Series (Iberia) |
| 3 | (Spain) Circuito de Jerez, Jerez de la Frontera | 10–11 February | 2024 GT Winter Series (Iberia) |
| 4 | (Spain) Circuit Ricardo Tormo, Cheste | 17–18 February | 2024 GT Winter Series (Iberia) |
| 5 | (Spain) MotorLand Aragón, Alcañiz | 2–3 March | 2024 GT Winter Series (Iberia) |
| 6 | (Spain) Circuit de Barcelona-Catalunya, Montmeló | 9–10 March | 2024 GT Winter Series (Iberia) |

== Entry list ==
| Entrant/Team | Car | Engine | No. | Drivers | Rounds |
GT3
| (Germany) Team Joos by Twin Busch | Porsche 911 GT3 R (992) | Porsche M97/80 4.2 L Flat-6 | 1 | (Germany) Michael Joos | 4 |
| (Germany) Team Joos by Twin Busch | Porsche 911 GT3 R (992) | Porsche M97/80 4.2 L Flat-6 | 1 | (Germany) Michael Kapfinger | 4, 6 |
| (Germany) Team Joos by Twin Busch | Porsche 911 GT3 R (992) | Porsche M97/80 4.2 L Flat-6 | 1 | (Germany) Johannes Kapfinger | 6 |
| (Germany) Haupt Racing Team | Mercedes-AMG GT3 Evo | Mercedes-AMG M159 6.2 L V8 | 3 | (South Africa) Kwanda Mokoena | 4, 6 |
| (Germany) Haupt Racing Team | Mercedes-AMG GT3 Evo | Mercedes-AMG M159 6.2 L V8 | 4 | (Germany) Finn Wiebelhaus | 2, 4, 6 |
| (Poland) Olimp Racing | Ferrari 488 GT3 Evo 2020 | Ferrari F154CB 3.9 L Turbo V8 | 5 | (Poland) Stanislaw Jedlinski | 1 |
| (Poland) Olimp Racing | Ferrari 488 GT3 Evo 2020 | Ferrari F154CB 3.9 L Turbo V8 | 5 | (Poland) Krystian Korzeniowski | 1 |
| (Poland) Olimp Racing | Audi R8 LMS Evo II | Audi DAR 5.2 L V10 | 77 | (Poland) Karol Basz | 1 |
| (Poland) Olimp Racing | Audi R8 LMS Evo II | Audi DAR 5.2 L V10 | 77 | (Poland) Marcin Jedlinski | 1 |
| (Germany) FK Performance Motorsport | BMW M4 GT3 | BMW S58B30T0 3.0 L Turbo I6 | 10 | (Germany) Louis Stern | 1–2 |
| (Germany) FK Performance Motorsport | BMW M4 GT3 | BMW S58B30T0 3.0 L Turbo I6 | 10 | (Canada) Bruno Spengler | 1–2 |
| (Germany) Schnitzelalm Racing | Mercedes-AMG GT3 Evo | Mercedes-AMG M159 6.2 L V8 | 11 | (Germany) Jay Mo Härtling | All |
| (Germany) Schnitzelalm Racing | Mercedes-AMG GT3 Evo | Mercedes-AMG M159 6.2 L V8 | 11 | (Germany) Kenneth Heyer | All |
| (Germany) Schnitzelalm Racing | Mercedes-AMG GT3 Evo | Mercedes-AMG M159 6.2 L V8 | 111 | (United States) David Thilenius | 5 |
| (Germany) Schnitzelalm Racing | Mercedes-AMG GT3 Evo | Mercedes-AMG M159 6.2 L V8 | 111 | (Germany) Moritz Wiskirchen | 5 |
| (Germany) Schnitzelalm Racing | Mercedes-AMG GT3 Evo | Mercedes-AMG M159 6.2 L V8 | 111 | (Germany) Luca Arnold | 6 |
| (Germany) Schnitzelalm Racing | Mercedes-AMG GT3 Evo | Mercedes-AMG M159 6.2 L V8 | 111 | (Germany) Roland Arnold | 6 |
| (Poland) Good Speed Racing | Mercedes-AMG GT3 Evo | Mercedes-AMG M159 6.2 L V8 | 14 | (Netherlands) "Daan Arrow" | 2, 6 |
| (Poland) Good Speed Racing | Mercedes-AMG GT3 Evo | Mercedes-AMG M159 6.2 L V8 | 14 | (Poland) Piotr Wira | 2, 6 |
| (Italy) Pellin Racing | Ferrari 488 GT3 Evo 2020 | Ferrari F154CB 3.9 L Turbo V8 | 23 | (United States) Thor Haugen | 1–2, 4, 6 |
| (Italy) Pellin Racing | Ferrari 488 GT3 Evo 2020 | Ferrari F154CB 3.9 L Turbo V8 | 23 | (Italy) Dario Capitanio | 1, 4, 6 |
| (Lithuania) Juta Racing | Audi R8 LMS Evo II | Audi DAR 5.2 L V10 | 24 | (Lithuania) Arunas Geciauskas | 4 |
| (Lithuania) Juta Racing | Audi R8 LMS Evo II | Audi DAR 5.2 L V10 | 24 | (Lithuania) Jonas Karklys | 4 |
| (Lithuania) Juta Racing | Audi R8 LMS Evo II | Audi DAR 5.2 L V10 | 71 | (Ukraine) Yevgen Sokolovskiy | 4 |
| (Lithuania) Juta Racing | Audi R8 LMS Evo II | Audi DAR 5.2 L V10 | 71 | (Sweden) Lukas Sundahl | 4 |
| (Switzerland) Kessel Racing | Ferrari 488 GT3 Evo 2020 | Ferrari F154CB 3.9 L Turbo V8 | 69 | (Switzerland) Alexandre Bochez | 4 |
| (Switzerland) Kessel Racing | Ferrari 488 GT3 Evo 2020 | Ferrari F154CB 3.9 L Turbo V8 | 69 | (Switzerland) Mikael Bochez | 4 |
| (Germany) Die Biermacher Racing | Ferrari 488 GT3 Evo 2020 | Ferrari F154CB 3.9 L Turbo V8 | 72 | (Germany) Uwe Lauer | 1–5 |
| (Germany) Die Biermacher Racing | Ferrari 488 GT3 Evo 2020 | Ferrari F154CB 3.9 L Turbo V8 | 72 | (Germany) Francesco Lopez | 1–5 |
| (Germany) Proton Huber Competition | Porsche 911 GT3 R (992) | Porsche M97/80 4.2 L Flat-6 | 73 | (Germany) Jörg Dreisow | 6 |
| (Germany) Proton Huber Competition | Porsche 911 GT3 R (992) | Porsche M97/80 4.2 L Flat-6 | 73 | (Germany) Manuel Lauck | 6 |
| (Italy) Rossocorsa Racing | Ferrari 296 GT3 | Ferrari F163 3.0 L Turbo V6 | 74 | (Italy) Samuele Buttarelli | 6 |
| (Italy) Rossocorsa Racing | Ferrari 296 GT3 | Ferrari F163 3.0 L Turbo V6 | 74 | (Italy) Stefano Marazzi | 6 |
| (Germany) SSR Performance | Porsche 911 GT3 R | Porsche M97/80 4.0 L Flat-6 | 92 | (Germany) Stefan Schlund | 2 |
| (Germany) SSR Performance | Lamborghini Huracán GT3 Evo II | Lamborghini 5.2 L V10 | 94 | (Denmark) Nicki Thiim | 4 |
| (Germany) Rinaldi Racing | Ferrari 296 GT3 | Ferrari F163 3.0 L Turbo V6 | 115 | (Germany) Pierre Ehret | 1–2, 5–6 |
| (Germany) Rinaldi Racing | Ferrari 296 GT3 | Ferrari F163 3.0 L Turbo V6 | 115 | (Germany) Christian Hook | 1–2, 5–6 |
| (Poland) PTT Racing | Mercedes-AMG GT3 Evo | Mercedes-AMG M159 6.2 L V8 | 147 | (Poland) Martin Kaczmarski | 3–6 |
GTX
| (Austria) razoon - more than racing | KTM X-Bow GT2 | Audi 2.5 L TFSI | 55 | (Denmark) Thomas Andersen | 6 |
| (Austria) razoon - more than racing | KTM X-Bow GT2 | Audi 2.5 L TFSI | 55 | (Denmark) Simon Birch | 6 |
Cup1
| (Switzerland) Kessel Racing | Ferrari 488 Challenge Evo | Ferrari 3.9 L Twin-Turbo V8 | 16 | (Greece) Petros Makris | 3–4 |
| (Switzerland) Kessel Racing | Ferrari 488 Challenge Evo | Ferrari 3.9 L Twin-Turbo V8 | 69 | (Switzerland) Alexandre Bochez | 3 |
| (Switzerland) Kessel Racing | Ferrari 488 Challenge Evo | Ferrari 3.9 L Twin-Turbo V8 | 69 | (Switzerland) Mikael Bochez | 3 |
| (Italy) AF Corse / XP Racing | Ferrari 488 Challenge Evo | Ferrari 3.9 L Twin-Turbo V8 | 27 | (Switzerland) Max-Hervé George | 6 |
| (Italy) AF Corse / XP Racing | Ferrari 488 Challenge Evo | Ferrari 3.9 L Twin-Turbo V8 | 333 | (Switzerland) Byron Baciocchi | 6 |
| (Italy) AF Corse | Ferrari 488 Challenge Evo | Ferrari 3.9 L Twin-Turbo V8 | 71 | (N/A) Raed Sahely | 6 |
| (Italy) AF Corse | Ferrari 488 Challenge Evo | Ferrari 3.9 L Twin-Turbo V8 | 105 | (Japan) Motohiko Isozaki | 2–3 |
| (Italy) AF Corse | Ferrari 488 Challenge Evo | Ferrari 3.9 L Twin-Turbo V8 | 151 | (United Kingdom) John Dhillon | 1–3, 6 |
| (Italy) AF Corse | Ferrari 488 Challenge Evo | Ferrari 3.9 L Twin-Turbo V8 | 151 | (Republic of Ireland) Matt Griffin | 1–3, 6 |
| (Italy) AF Corse | Ferrari 488 Challenge Evo | Ferrari 3.9 L Twin-Turbo V8 | 220 | (United States) Talal Shair | 2, 6 |
| (Germany) Mertel Motorsport | Ferrari 488 Challenge Evo | Ferrari 3.9 L Twin-Turbo V8 | 81 | (Italy) Tommaso Lovati | 6 |
| (Germany) Mertel Motorsport | Ferrari 488 Challenge Evo | Ferrari 3.9 L Twin-Turbo V8 | 81 | (Spain) Arturo Melgar | 6 |
| (Germany) Mertel Motorsport | Ferrari 488 Challenge Evo | Ferrari 3.9 L Twin-Turbo V8 | 830 | (Italy) Maurizio Ceresoli | 6 |
| (Germany) Mertel Motorsport | Ferrari 488 Challenge Evo | Ferrari 3.9 L Twin-Turbo V8 | 830 | (Italy) Mark Speakerwas | 6 |
| (Germany) JVO Racing | Ferrari 488 Challenge Evo | Ferrari 3.9 L Twin-Turbo V8 | 88 | (Germany) Frank Kewitz | 3–4, 6 |
| (Germany) JVO Racing | Ferrari 488 Challenge Evo | Ferrari 3.9 L Twin-Turbo V8 | 88 | (Poland) Kevin Mirocha | 3–4, 6 |
| (Sweden) Wileco Motorsport | Ferrari 488 Challenge Evo | Ferrari 3.9 L Twin-Turbo V8 | 953 | (Spain) Pedro Silvero | 2 |
Cup2
| (Germany) Laptime Performance | Porsche 992 GT3 Cup | Porsche 4.0 L Flat-6 | 2 | (Germany) Marco Daedelow | 2 |
| (Germany) Laptime Performance | Porsche 992 GT3 Cup | Porsche 4.0 L Flat-6 | 2 | (Germany) Alex Hardt | 2 |
| (Germany) Laptime Performance | Porsche 992 GT3 Cup | Porsche 4.0 L Flat-6 | 20 | (Germany) Damir Hot | 1–2 |
| (Germany) Laptime Performance | Porsche 992 GT3 Cup | Porsche 4.0 L Flat-6 | 20 | (Canada) Stefan Rzadzinski | 1 |
| (Poland) PTT Racing | Porsche 992 GT3 Cup | Porsche 4.0 L Flat-6 | 7 | (Poland) Hubert Dametko | All |
| (Poland) PTT Racing | Porsche 992 GT3 Cup | Porsche 4.0 L Flat-6 | 13 | (Poland) Mateusz Lisowski | 3–4 |
| (Poland) PTT Racing | Porsche 992 GT3 Cup | Porsche 4.0 L Flat-6 | 44 | (Poland) Mateusz Lisowski | 1–2 |
| (Poland) PTT Racing | Porsche 992 GT3 Cup | Porsche 4.0 L Flat-6 | 33 | (Poland) Przemyslaw Bienkowski | 1–4 |
| (Poland) PTT Racing | Porsche 992 GT3 Cup | Porsche 4.0 L Flat-6 | 741 | (Poland) Igor Klaja | 1–4, 6 |
| (Germany) Plusline Racing Team | Porsche 992 GT3 Cup | Porsche 4.0 L Flat-6 | 38 | (Germany) Joachim Bölting | 1, 4–6 |
| (Germany) Plusline Racing Team | Porsche 992 GT3 Cup | Porsche 4.0 L Flat-6 | 83 | (Netherlands) Marcel van Berlo | 4, 6 |
| (Germany) Plusline Racing Team | Porsche 992 GT3 Cup | Porsche 4.0 L Flat-6 | 83 | (Netherlands) Glenn van Berlo | 4, 6 |
| (France) Team52 | Porsche 992 GT3 Cup | Porsche 4.0 L Flat-6 | 52 | (France) Guillaume Giorza | 6 |
| (France) Team52 | Porsche 992 GT3 Cup | Porsche 4.0 L Flat-6 | 52 | (France) Yves Godard | 6 |
| (Sweden) Wileco Motorsport | Porsche 992 GT3 Cup | Porsche 4.0 L Flat-6 | 56 | (Sweden) Calle Bergmann | 6 |
| (Sweden) Wileco Motorsport | Porsche 992 GT3 Cup | Porsche 4.0 L Flat-6 | 951 | (Spain) Pablo Bras Silvero | 2, 5 |
| (Sweden) Wileco Motorsport | Porsche 992 GT3 Cup | Porsche 4.0 L Flat-6 | 952 | (Spain) Pedro Miguel Brás | 2 |
| (Sweden) Wileco Motorsport | Porsche 992 GT3 Cup | Porsche 4.0 L Flat-6 | 952 | (Spain) Pedro Laurinho | 5 |
| (Sweden) Wileco Motorsport | Porsche 992 GT3 Cup | Porsche 4.0 L Flat-6 | 952 | (Spain) Miguel Gomez | 5 |
| (Romania) Newton Racing | Porsche 992 GT3 Cup | Porsche 4.0 L Flat-6 | 100 | (Romania) Dragos Buriu | 4 |
| (Austria) MS Racing | Porsche 992 GT3 Cup | Porsche 4.0 L Flat-6 | 128 | (Austria) Werder Pressbaum | 2 |
| (Austria) MS Racing | Porsche 992 GT3 Cup | Porsche 4.0 L Flat-6 | 128 | (Austria) Benedikt Seibt | 2 |
| (Austria) MS Racing | Porsche 992 GT3 Cup | Porsche 4.0 L Flat-6 | 128 | (Austria) Leo Willert | 5 |
| (Austria) MS Racing | Porsche 992 GT3 Cup | Porsche 4.0 L Flat-6 | 128 | (Austria) Werner Panhauser | 5 |
| (Portugal) RACAR Motorsport | Porsche 992 GT3 Cup | Porsche 4.0 L Flat-6 | 911 | (Portugal) Leandro Martins | All |
| (Portugal) RACAR Motorsport | Porsche 992 GT3 Cup | Porsche 4.0 L Flat-6 | 911 | (Austria) Dieter Svepes | 1–4, 6 |
| (Portugal) RACAR Motorsport | Porsche 992 GT3 Cup | Porsche 4.0 L Flat-6 | 911 | (Luxembourg) Dylan Pereira | 5 |
| (Germany) Team Race Car Events | Porsche 992 GT3 Cup | Porsche 4.0 L Flat-6 | 992 | (Germany) Sebastian Daum | 6 |
| (Germany) Team Race Car Events | Porsche 992 GT3 Cup | Porsche 4.0 L Flat-6 | 992 | (Germany) Markus Sedlmaier | 6 |
Cup3
| (Denmark) Sunder Motorworks | Porsche 991 GT3 II Cup | Porsche 4.0 L Flat-6 | 32 | (Denmark) Morten Strømsted | 2, 6 |
| (Denmark) Sunder Motorworks | Porsche 991 GT3 II Cup | Porsche 4.0 L Flat-6 | 32 | (Denmark) Noah Strømsted | 6 |
| (France) Team52 | Porsche 991 GT3 II Cup | Porsche 4.0 L Flat-6 | 52 | (France) Guillaume Giorza | 4 |
| (France) Team52 | Porsche 991 GT3 II Cup | Porsche 4.0 L Flat-6 | 52 | (France) Yves Goddard | 4 |
Cup4
| GT3 Poland | Lamborghini Huracán Super Trofeo Evo2 | Lamborghini 5.2 L V10 | 6 | (Poland) Andrzej Lewandowski | 1, 3, 6 |
| GT3 Poland | Lamborghini Huracán Super Trofeo Evo2 | Lamborghini 5.2 L V10 | 6 | (Poland) Adrian Lewandowski | 1–3, 6 |
| (Belgium) BDR Competition by Grupo Prom Racing Team | Lamborghini Huracán Super Trofeo Evo2 | Lamborghini 5.2 L V10 | 28 | (Belgium) Amaury Bonduel | 6 |
| (Belgium) BDR Competition by Grupo Prom Racing Team | Lamborghini Huracán Super Trofeo Evo2 | Lamborghini 5.2 L V10 | 177 | (Mexico) Alfredo Hernandez | 2–3, 6 |
| (Italy) Bonaldi Motorsport | Lamborghini Huracán Super Trofeo Evo2 | Lamborghini 5.2 L V10 | 30 | (Serbia) Miloš Pavlović | 2–3, 6 |
| (Italy) Bonaldi Motorsport | Lamborghini Huracán Super Trofeo Evo2 | Lamborghini 5.2 L V10 | 30 | (Italy) Alessio Ruffini | 2–3, 6 |
| (Italy) Lamborghini Roma by DL Racing | Lamborghini Huracán Super Trofeo Evo2 | Lamborghini 5.2 L V10 | 62 | (Egypt) Ibrahim Badawy | 3, 6 |
Entry Lists:

== Race results ==
Bold indicates overall winner.

| Event | | Circuit | Date | GT3 Winners | Cup1 Winners | Cup2 Winners | Cup3 Winners | Cup4 Winners | Report |
|---|---|---|---|---|---|---|---|---|---|
| 1 | R1 | (Portugal) Circuito do Estoril | 13–14 January | (Germany) No. 11 SR Motorsport | (Italy) No. 151 AF Corse | (Portugal) No. 911 RACAR Motorsport | No Entries | **No. 6 GT3 Poland** | |
| 1 | R1 | (Portugal) Circuito do Estoril | 13–14 January | (Germany) Jay Mo Härtling (Germany) Kenneth Heyer | (United Kingdom) John Dhillon (Republic of Ireland) Matt Griffin | (Portugal) Leandro Martins (Austria) Dieter Svepes | No Entries | **(Poland) Andrzej Lewandowski** **(Poland) Adrian Lewandowski** | |
| 1 | R2 | (Portugal) Circuito do Estoril | 13–14 January | **(Germany) No. 72 Die Biermacher Racing** | (Italy) No. 151 AF Corse | (Poland) No. 7 PTT Racing | No Entries | No. 6 GT3 Poland | |
| 1 | R2 | (Portugal) Circuito do Estoril | 13–14 January | **(Germany) Uwe Lauer** **(Germany) Francesco Lopez** | (United Kingdom) John Dhillon (Republic of Ireland) Matt Griffin | (Poland) Hubert Dametko (Poland) Igor Klaja | No Entries | (Poland) Andrzej Lewandowski (Poland) Adrian Lewandowski | |
| 1 | R3 | (Portugal) Circuito do Estoril | 13–14 January | **(Germany) No. 11 SR Motorsport** | (Italy) No. 151 AF Corse | (Poland) No. 44 PTT Racing | No Entries | No. 6 GT3 Poland | |
| 1 | R3 | (Portugal) Circuito do Estoril | 13–14 January | **(Germany) Jay Mo Härtling** **(Germany) Kenneth Heyer** | (United Kingdom) John Dhillon (Republic of Ireland) Matt Griffin | (Poland) Mateusz Lisowski | No Entries | (Poland) Andrzej Lewandowski (Poland) Adrian Lewandowski | |
| 2 | R1 | (Portugal) Algarve International Circuit | 20–21 January | **(Germany) No. 11 SR Motorsport** | (Italy) No. 151 AF Corse | (Portugal) No. 911 RACAR Motorsport | (Denmark) No. 32 Sunder Motorworks | No. 6 GT3 Poland | |
| 2 | R1 | (Portugal) Algarve International Circuit | 20–21 January | **(Germany) Jay Mo Härtling** **(Germany) Kenneth Heyer** | (United Kingdom) John Dhillon (Republic of Ireland) Matt Griffin | (Portugal) Leandro Martins (Austria) Dieter Svepes | (Denmark) Morten Strømsted | (Poland) Adrian Lewandowski | |
| 2 | R2 | (Portugal) Algarve International Circuit | 20–21 January | **(Germany) No. 4 Haupt Racing Team** | (Italy) No. 105 AF Corse | (Portugal) No. 911 RACAR Motorsport | (Denmark) No. 32 Sunder Motorworks | No. 6 GT3 Poland | |
| 2 | R2 | (Portugal) Algarve International Circuit | 20–21 January | **(Germany) Finn Wiebelhaus** | (Japan) Motohiko Isozaki | (Portugal) Leandro Martins (Austria) Dieter Svepes | (Denmark) Morten Strømsted | (Poland) Adrian Lewandowski | |
| 2 | R3 | (Portugal) Algarve International Circuit | 20–21 January | **(Germany) No. 4 Haupt Racing Team** | (Italy) No. 151 AF Corse | (Poland) No. 44 PTT Racing | (Denmark) No. 32 Sunder Motorworks | No. 6 GT3 Poland | |
| 2 | R3 | (Portugal) Algarve International Circuit | 20–21 January | **(Germany) Finn Wiebelhaus** | (United Kingdom) John Dhillon (Republic of Ireland) Matt Griffin | (Poland) Mateusz Lisowski | (Denmark) Morten Strømsted | (Poland) Adrian Lewandowski | |
| 3 | R1 | (Spain) Circuito de Jerez | 10–11 February | **(Germany) No. 11 SR Motorsport** | (Italy) No. 151 AF Corse | (Poland) No. 7 PTT Racing | No Entries | (Italy) No. 62 Lamborghini Roma by DL Racing | |
| 3 | R1 | (Spain) Circuito de Jerez | 10–11 February | **(Germany) Jay Mo Härtling** **(Germany) Kenneth Heyer** | (United Kingdom) John Dhillon (Republic of Ireland) Matt Griffin | (Poland) Hubert Dametko (Poland) Igor Klaja | No Entries | (Egypt) Ibrahim Badawy | |
| 3 | R2 | (Spain) Circuito de Jerez | 10–11 February | **(Poland) No. 147 PTT Racing** | (Italy) No. 151 AF Corse | (Poland) No. 7 PTT Racing | No Entries | No. 6 GT3 Poland | |
| 3 | R2 | (Spain) Circuito de Jerez | 10–11 February | **(Poland) Martin Kaczmarski** | (United Kingdom) John Dhillon (Republic of Ireland) Matt Griffin | (Poland) Hubert Dametko (Poland) Igor Klaja | No Entries | (Poland) Andrzej Lewandowski (Poland) Adrian Lewandowski | |
| 3 | R3 | (Spain) Circuito de Jerez | 10–11 February | **(Germany) No. 11 SR Motorsport** | (Switzerland) No. 16 Kessel Racing | (Poland) No. 13 PTT Racing | No Entries | (Belgium) No. 177 BDR Competition by Group Prom Racing Team | |
| 3 | R3 | (Spain) Circuito de Jerez | 10–11 February | **(Germany) Jay Mo Härtling** **(Germany) Kenneth Heyer** | (Greece) Petros Makris | (Poland) Mateusz Lisowski | No Entries | (Mexico) Alfredo Hernandez | |

== Championship Standings ==
Points are awarded as follows:

| Position in class | Number of starters per class | | | | | | |
| Position in class | 1 | 2 | 3 | 4 | 5 | 6 | 7 |
|---|---|---|---|---|---|---|---|
| 1st | 5.00 | 7.50 | 8.33 | 8.75 | 9.00 | 9.17 | 9.29 |
| 2nd | | 2.50 | 5.00 | 6.25 | 7.00 | 7.50 | 7.86 |
| 3rd | | | 1.67 | 3.75 | 5.00 | 5.83 | 6.43 |
| 4th | | | | 1.25 | 3.00 | 4.17 | 5.00 |
| 5th | | | | | 1.00 | 2.50 | 3.57 |
| 6th | | | | | | 0.83 | 2.14 |
| 7th | | | | | | | 0.71 |

=== GT3 Drivers ===
| Pos. | Driver | Team | EST (Portugal) | | | POR (Portugal) | | | JER (Spain) | | | VAL (Spain) | | | ARA (Spain) | | | CAT (Spain) | | | Points |
| Pos. | Driver | Team | RC1 | RC2 | RC3 | RC1 | RC2 | RC3 | RC1 | RC2 | RC3 | RC1 | RC2 | RC3 | RC1 | RC2 | RC3 | RC1 (Note: Half of points were awarded for Race 1, as less than 50% of the laps were completed.) | RC2 | RC3 | Points |
|---|---|---|---|---|---|---|---|---|---|---|---|---|---|---|---|---|---|---|---|---|---|
| 1 | (Germany) Jay Mo Härtling (Germany) Kenneth Heyer | (Germany) Schnitzelalm Racing | 1 | 2 | 1 | 1 | 2 | 2 | 1 | 2 | 1 | 5 | 6 | 4 | 2 | 1 | 1 | 2 | Ret | 4 | 113.22 |
| 2 | (Germany) Finn Wiebelhaus | (Germany) Haupt Racing Team | | | | 2 | 1 | 1 | | | | 1 | 1 | 1 | | | | 3 | 1 | 1 | 75.335 |
| 3 | (Poland) Martin Kaczmarski | (Poland) PTT Racing | | | | | | | 2 | 1 | 2 | 7 | 5 | DNS | 1 | 3 | DNS | Ret | Ret | DNS | 35.11 |
| 4 | (Germany) Michael Kapfinger | (Germany) Team Joos by Twin Busch | | | | | | | | | | 4 | 3 | 3 | | | | 5 | 3 | 2 | 33.395 |
| 5 | (Germany) Uwe Lauer (Germany) Francesco Lopez | (Germany) Die Biermacher Racing | 3 | 1 | 2 | 6 | 4 | 5 | 3 | 3 | 3 | 10 | 10 | 7 | | | | | | | 32.8 |
| 6 | (South Africa) Kwanda Mokoena | (Germany) Haupt Racing Team | | | | | | | | | | 3 | 9 | 2 | | | | 8 | 2 | 5 | 25.72 |
| 7 | (Germany) Pierre Ehret (Germany) Christian Hook | (Germany) Rinaldi Racing | Ret | 4 | 3 | 3 | 3 | 4 | | | | | | | 4 | 4 | 3 | Ret | 8 | 8 | 25.58 |
| 8 | (Netherlands) "Daan Arrow" (Poland) Piotr Wira | (Poland) Good Speed Racing | | | | 4 | Ret | 3 | | | | | | | | | | 1 | 7 | 3 | 20.955 |
| 9 | (Germany) Michael Joos | (Germany) Team Joos by Twin Busch | | | | | | | | | | 4 | 3 | 3 | | | | | | | 17.86 |
| 10 | (Germany) Johannes Kapfinger | (Germany) Team Joos by Twin Busch | | | | | | | | | | | | | | | | 5 | 3 | 2 | 16.075 |
| 11 | (Denmark) Nicki Thiim | (Germany) SSR Performance | | | | | | | | | | 2 | 2 | DNS | | | | | | | 15.72 |
| 12 | (United States) David Thilenius (Germany) Moritz Wiskirchen | (Germany) Schnitzelalm Racing | | | | | | | | | | | | | 3 | 2 | 2 | | | | 15 |
| 13 | (United States) Thor Haugen | (Italy) Pellin Racing | 4 | 3 | 4 | 5 | Ret | DNS | | | | 9 | 8 | 8 | | | | | | | 12.92 |
| 14 | (Italy) Dario Capitanio | (Italy) Pellin Racing | 4 | 3 | 4 | | | | | | | 9 | 8 | 8 | | | | | | | 10.42 |
| 15 | (Lithuania) Arunas Geciauskas (Lithuania) Jonas Karklys | (Lithuania) Juta Racing | | | | | | | | | | 8 | 4 | 5 | | | | | | | 8.57 |
| 16 | (Germany) Jörg Dreisow (Germany) Manuel Lauck | (Germany) Proton Huber Competition | | | | | | | | | | | | | | | | 4 | 5 | 6 | 8.21 |
| 17 | (Poland) Stanislaw Jedlinski (Poland) Krystian Korzeniowski | (Poland) Olimp Racing | 2 | DNS | DNS | | | | | | | | | | | | | | | | 7.5 |
| 18 | (Germany) Luca Arnold (Germany) Roland Arnold | (Germany) Schnitzelalm Racing | | | | | | | | | | | | | | | | 6 | 4 | 7 | 6.78 |
| 19 | (Ukraine) Yevgen Sokolovskiy (Sweden) Lukas Sundahl | (Lithuania) Juta Racing | | | | | | | | | | 6 | 7 | 6 | | | | | | | 4.99 |
| 20 | (Italy) Samuele Buttarelli (Italy) Stefano Marazzi | (Italy) Rossocorsa Racing | | | | | | | | | | | | | | | | 7 | 6 | 9 | 2.495 |
| 21 | (Germany) Louis Stern (Canada) Bruno Spengler | (Germany) FK Performance Motorsport | Ret | 5 | DNS | DNS | WD | WD | | | | | | | | | | | | | 1 |
| 22 | (Switzerland) Alexandre Bochez (Switzerland) Mikael Bochez | (Switzerland) Kessel Racing | | | | | | | | | | 11 | 11 | 9 | | | | | | | 0 |
| – | (Poland) Karol Basz (Poland) Marcin Jedlinski | (Poland) Olimp Racing | DNS | DNS | DNS | | | | | | | | | | | | | | | | 0 |
| – | (Germany) Stefan Schlund | (Germany) SSR Performance | | | | DNS | WD | WD | | | | | | | | | | | | | 0 |

=== Cup 1 Drivers ===
| Pos. | Driver | Team | EST (Portugal) | | | POR (Portugal) | | | JER (Spain) | | | VAL (Spain) | | | ARA (Spain) | | | CAT (Spain) | | | Points |
| Pos. | Driver | Team | RC1 | RC2 | RC3 | RC1 | RC2 | RC3 | RC1 | RC2 | RC3 | RC1 | RC2 | RC3 | RC1 | RC2 | RC3 | RC1 | RC2 | RC3 | Points |
|---|---|---|---|---|---|---|---|---|---|---|---|---|---|---|---|---|---|---|---|---|---|
| 1 | (United Kingdom) John Dhillon | (Italy) AF Corse | 1 | 1 | 1 | 1 | 2 | 1 | 1 | 1 | Ret | | | | | | | | | | 38.75 |
| 1 | (Republic of Ireland) Matt Griffin | (Italy) AF Corse | 1 | 1 | 1 | 1 | 2 | 1 | 1 | 1 | Ret | | | | | | | | | | 38.75 |
| 2 | (Japan) Motohiko Isozaki | (Italy) AF Corse | | | | 2 | 1 | 2 | 2 | 2 | 2 | | | | | | | | | | 21.25 |
| 3 | (United States) Talal Shair | (Italy) AF Corse | | | | 3 | 3 | 3 | | | | | | | | | | | | | 11.25 |
| 4 | Pedro Silvero | (Sweden) Wileco Motorsport | | | | 4 | 4 | 4 | | | | | | | | | | | | | 5.00 |
| – | (Greece) Petros Makris | (Switzerland) Kessel Racing | | | | | | | 3 | 3 | 1 | | | | | | | | | | |
| – | (Switzerland) Alexandre Bochez | (Switzerland) Kessel Racing | | | | | | | DNS | | | | | | | | | | | | |
| – | (Switzerland) Mikael Bochez | (Switzerland) Kessel Racing | | | | | | | DNS | | | | | | | | | | | | |

=== Cup 2 Drivers ===
| Pos. | Driver | Team | EST (Portugal) | | | POR (Portugal) | | | JER (Spain) | | | VAL (Spain) | | | ARA (Spain) | | | CAT (Spain) | | | Points |
| Pos. | Driver | Team | RC1 | RC2 | RC3 | RC1 | RC2 | RC3 | RC1 | RC2 | RC3 | RC1 | RC2 | RC3 | RC1 | RC2 | RC3 | RC1 | RC2 | RC3 | Points |
|---|---|---|---|---|---|---|---|---|---|---|---|---|---|---|---|---|---|---|---|---|---|
| 1 | (Portugal) Leandro Martins | (Portugal) RACAR Motorsport | 1 | Ret | DNS | 1 | 1 | 2 | 2 | 2 | 2 | | | | | | | | | | 35.61 |
| 1 | (Austria) Dieter Svepes | (Portugal) RACAR Motorsport | 1 | Ret | DNS | 1 | 1 | 2 | 2 | 2 | 2 | | | | | | | | | | 35.61 |
| 2 | (Poland) Hubert Dametko | (Poland) PTT Racing | 3 | 1 | 4 | 3 | 3 | 6 | 1 | 1 | DNS | | | | | | | | | | 31.25 |
| 3 | (Germany) Damir Hot | (Germany) Laptime Performance | 4 | 2 | 3 | 4 | 8 | 4 | | | | | | | | | | | | | 25.42 |
| 3 | (Canada) Stefan Rzadzinski | (Germany) Laptime Performance | 4 | 2 | 3 | 4 | 8 | 4 | | | | | | | | | | | | | 25.42 |
| 4 | (Spain) Pablo Brás Silvero | (Sweden) Wileco Motorsport | | | | 2 | 2 | 5 | | | | | | | | | | | | | 19.29 |
| 5 | (Poland) Mateusz Lisowski | (Poland) PTT Racing | DNS | DNS | 1 | | | 1 | DNS | DNS | 1 | | | | | | | | | | 18.40 |
| 6 | (Poland) Igor Klaja | (Poland) PTT Racing | 3 | 1 | 4 | | | 6 | 1 | 1 | DNS | | | | | | | | | | 18.39 |
| 7 | (Germany) Joachim Bölting | (Germany) Plusline Racing Team | 2 | 4 | 2 | | | | | | | | | | | | | | | | 17.92 |
| 8 | (Germany) Marco Daedelow | (Germany) Laptime Performance | | | | Ret | 4 | 3 | | | | | | | | | | | | | 11.43 |
| 8 | (Germany) Alex Hardt | (Germany) Laptime Performance | | | | Ret | 4 | 3 | | | | | | | | | | | | | 11.43 |
| 9 | (Poland) Przemyslaw Bienkowski | (Poland) PTT Racing | 5 | 5 | DNS | 7 | 5 | | 4 | 4 | DNS | | | | | | | | | | 9.28 |
| 10 | (Poland) Igor Klaja | (Poland) PTT Racing | Ret | 3 | DNS | 5 | Ret | | 3 | 3 | 3 | | | | | | | | | | 7.74 |
| 11 | (Austria) Werder Pressbaum | (Austria) MS Racing | | | | 6 | 7 | 8 | | | | | | | | | | | | | 2.85 |
| 11 | (Austria) Benedikt Seibt | (Austria) MS Racing | | | | 6 | 7 | 8 | | | | | | | | | | | | | 2.85 |
| 11 | (Spain) Pedro Miguel Brás | (Sweden) Wileco Motorsport | | | | 8 | 6 | 7 | | | | | | | | | | | | | 2.85 |

=== Cup 3 Drivers ===
| Pos. | Driver | Team | EST (Portugal) | | | POR (Portugal) | | | JER (Spain) | | | VAL (Spain) | | | ARA (Spain) | | | CAT (Spain) | | | Points |
| Pos. | Driver | Team | RC1 | RC2 | RC3 | RC1 | RC2 | RC3 | RC1 | RC2 | RC3 | RC1 | RC2 | RC3 | RC1 | RC2 | RC3 | RC1 | RC2 | RC3 | Points |
|---|---|---|---|---|---|---|---|---|---|---|---|---|---|---|---|---|---|---|---|---|---|
| 1 | (Denmark) Morten Strømsted | (Denmark) Sunder Motorworks | | | | 1 | 1 | 1 | | | | | | | | | | | | | 15 |

=== Cup 4 Drivers ===
| Pos. | Driver | Team | EST (Portugal) | | | POR (Portugal) | | | JER (Spain) | | | VAL (Spain) | | | ARA (Spain) | | | CAT (Spain) | | | Points |
| Pos. | Driver | Team | RC1 | RC2 | RC3 | RC1 | RC2 | RC3 | RC1 | RC2 | RC3 | RC1 | RC2 | RC3 | RC1 | RC2 | RC3 | RC1 | RC2 | RC3 | Points |
|---|---|---|---|---|---|---|---|---|---|---|---|---|---|---|---|---|---|---|---|---|---|
| 1 | (Poland) Adrian Lewandowski | GT3 Poland | 1 | 1 | 1 | 1 | 1 | 1 | 2 | 1 | 2 | | | | | | | | | | 39.99 |
| 2 | (Poland) Andrzej Lewandowski | GT3 Poland | 1 | 1 | 1 | | | | 2 | 1 | 2 | | | | | | | | | | 15 |
| 3 | (Mexico) Alfredo Hernandez | (Belgium) BDR Competition by Group Prom Racing Team | | | | 2 | 2 | 3 | DNS | 2 | 1 | | | | | | | | | | 11.67 |
| 4 | (Serbia) Miloš Pavlović | (Italy) Bonaldi Motorsport | | | | 3 | 3 | 2 | 3 | 4 | DNS | | | | | | | | | | 8.34 |
| 4 | (Italy) Alessio Ruffini | (Italy) Bonaldi Motorsport | | | | 3 | 3 | 2 | 3 | 4 | DNS | | | | | | | | | | 8.34 |
| – | (Egypt) Ibrahim Badawy | (Italy) Lamborghini Roma by DL Racing | | | | | | | 1 | 3 | 3 | | | | | | | | | | |
