= 2025 ADAC GT Masters =

German sports car racing season

The 2025 ADAC GT Masters was the 19th season of ADAC GT Masters, the grand tourer-style sports car racing series founded by the German automobile club ADAC.

== Race calendar ==
Round	Circuit	Location	Race 1	Race 2
1	(Germany) Lausitzring	Klettwitz, Brandenburg	24 May	25 May
2	(Netherlands) Circuit Zandvoort	Zandvoort, North Holland	7 June	8 June
3	(Germany) Nürburgring	Nürburg, Rhineland-Palatinate	12 July	13 July
4	(Austria) Salzburgring	Plainfeld, Austria	6 September	7 September
5	(Austria) Red Bull Ring	Spielberg, Styria	13 September	14 September
6	(Germany) Hockenheimring	Hockenheim, Baden-Württemberg	4 October	5 October

== Entry list ==
Team	Car	No.	Driver	Class	Rounds
(Germany) Haupt Racing Team	Ford Mustang GT3	1	(Germany) Salman Owega	S	All
(Germany) Haupt Racing Team	Ford Mustang GT3	1	(Germany) Finn Wiebelhaus	S	All
(Germany) Haupt Racing Team	Ford Mustang GT3	2	(Venezuela) Jonathan Cecotto	S	All
(Germany) Haupt Racing Team	Ford Mustang GT3	2	(Germany) Dennis Fetzer	S	All
(Germany) Haupt Racing Team	Ford Mustang GT3	3	(Germany) Niklas Kalus	S	All (Note: Kalus was originally entered to drive the No. 3 car during the Nürburgring round, but he withdrew after practice 2 due to injuries sustained in an e-scooter incident. David Schumacher replaced him for the remainder of that round.)
(Germany) Haupt Racing Team	Ford Mustang GT3	3	(Germany) Max Reis	S	All
(Germany) Haupt Racing Team	Ford Mustang GT3	3	(Germany) David Schumacher	S	3
(Switzerland) Fach Auto Tech	Porsche 911 GT3 R (992)	4	(Switzerland) Alexander Fach	PA	All
(Switzerland) Fach Auto Tech	Porsche 911 GT3 R (992)	4	(Germany) Alexander Schwarzer	PA	All
(Germany) Liqui Moly Team Engstler by GRT	Lamborghini Huracán GT3 Evo 2	6	(Poland) Szymon Ładniak	S	1–3
(Germany) Liqui Moly Team Engstler by GRT	Lamborghini Huracán GT3 Evo 2	6	(Netherlands) Dante Rappange	S	1
(Germany) Liqui Moly Team Engstler by GRT	Lamborghini Huracán GT3 Evo 2	6	(Belgium) Baptiste Moulin	S	2
(Germany) Liqui Moly Team Engstler by GRT	Lamborghini Huracán GT3 Evo 2	6	(Austria) Tim Hütter	S	3–6
(Germany) Liqui Moly Team Engstler by GRT	Lamborghini Huracán GT3 Evo 2	6	(Norway) Storm Gjerdrum	S	4
(Germany) Liqui Moly Team Engstler by GRT	Lamborghini Huracán GT3 Evo 2	6	(Switzerland) Felix Hirsiger	S	5
(Germany) Liqui Moly Team Engstler by GRT	Lamborghini Huracán GT3 Evo 2	6	(United States) John Paul Southern Jr.	S	6
(Germany) Liqui Moly Team Engstler by GRT	Lamborghini Huracán GT3 Evo 2	8	(Norway) Emil Gjerdrum	PA	1–2
(Germany) Liqui Moly Team Engstler by GRT	Lamborghini Huracán GT3 Evo 2	8	(Lithuania) Jonas Karklys	PA	1–2
(Germany) Liqui Moly Team Engstler NordVPN by GRT	Lamborghini Huracán GT3 Evo 2	8	(Norway) Emil Gjerdrum	PA	3–6
(Germany) Liqui Moly Team Engstler NordVPN by GRT	Lamborghini Huracán GT3 Evo 2	8	(Lithuania) Jonas Karklys	PA	3–6
(Germany) Dörr Motorsport	McLaren 720S GT3 Evo	7	(Germany) Ben Dörr	S	4
(Germany) Dörr Motorsport	McLaren 720S GT3 Evo	7	(Portugal) Guilherme Oliveira	S	4
(Germany) FK Performance Motorsport	BMW M4 GT3 Evo	10	(Philippines) Eduardo Coseteng	S	All
(Germany) FK Performance Motorsport	BMW M4 GT3 Evo	10	(Germany) Julian Hanses	S	All
(Germany) FK Performance Motorsport	BMW M4 GT3 Evo	11	(South Africa) Leyton Fourie	S	All
(Germany) FK Performance Motorsport	BMW M4 GT3 Evo	11	(Germany) Tim Zimmermann	S	All
(Austria) Razoon – more than racing	Porsche 911 GT3 R (992)	14	(Denmark) Simon Birch	S	All
(Austria) Razoon – more than racing	Porsche 911 GT3 R (992)	14	(Austria) Leo Pichler	S	All
(Germany) Scherer Sport PHX	Audi R8 LMS Evo II	16	(Germany) Denis Bulatov	S	All
(Germany) Scherer Sport PHX	Audi R8 LMS Evo II	16	(Germany) Nico Hantke	S	All
(Germany) SR Motorsport by Schnitzelalm	Mercedes-AMG GT3 Evo	21	(Germany) Jannes Fittje	S	All
(Germany) SR Motorsport by Schnitzelalm	Mercedes-AMG GT3 Evo	21	(Germany) Moritz Wiskirchen	S	All
(Czech Republic) Senkyr Motorsport	BMW M4 GT3	23	(Slovakia) Richard Gonda	PA	5
(Czech Republic) Senkyr Motorsport	BMW M4 GT3	23	(Slovakia) Rudolf Beňo	PA	5
(Germany) Paul Motorsport	Lamborghini Huracán GT3 Evo 2	33	(Germany) Simon Connor Primm	S	All
(Germany) Paul Motorsport	Lamborghini Huracán GT3 Evo 2	33	(Germany) Finn Zulauf	S	All
(Slovakia) ARC Bratislava	Lamborghini Huracán GT3 Evo	44	(Austria) Gerhard Tweraser	PA	5
(Slovakia) ARC Bratislava	Lamborghini Huracán GT3 Evo	44	(Slovakia) Adam Konopka	PA	5
(Germany) Schubert Motorsport	BMW M4 GT3 Evo	56	(Germany) Juliano Holzem	S	All
(Germany) Schubert Motorsport	BMW M4 GT3 Evo	56	(Germany) Sandro Holzem	S	All
(Austria) Baron Motorsport	Ferrari 296 GT3	66	(Austria) Ernst Kirchmayr	PA	5
(Austria) Baron Motorsport	Ferrari 296 GT3	66	(Italy) Fabrizio Crestani	PA	5
(Austria) Baron Motorsport	Ferrari 296 GT3	93	(Italy) Edoardo Bacci	S	5
(Austria) Baron Motorsport	Ferrari 296 GT3	93	(Austria) Philipp Baron	S	5
(Germany) Land-Motorsport	Audi R8 LMS Evo II	68	(Germany) Carrie Schreiner	S	All
(Germany) Land-Motorsport	Audi R8 LMS Evo II	68	(Switzerland) Alain Valente	S	All
(Germany) Team Joos Sportwagentechnik	Porsche 911 GT3 R (992)	91	(Germany) Michael Joos	S	3
(Germany) Team Joos Sportwagentechnik	Porsche 911 GT3 R (992)	91	(Austria) Felix Neuhofer	S	3
(Germany) Team Neuhofer Rennsport	Porsche 911 GT3 R (992)	92	(Austria) Felix Neuhofer	S	4
(Germany) Team Neuhofer Rennsport	Porsche 911 GT3 R (992)	92	(Germany) Alfred Renauer	S	4

Icon	Class
S	Silver Cup
PA	Pro-Am Cup
	Guest Starter

== Race results ==
Bold indicated overall winner.

Round		Circuit	Pole position	Silver winner	Pro-Am winner
1	R1	(Germany) Lausitzring	(Germany) No.33 Paul Motorsport	**(Austria) No. 14 Razoon – more than racing**	(Switzerland) No. 4 Fach Auto Tech
1	R1	(Germany) Lausitzring	(Germany) Simon Connor Primm **(Germany) Finn Zulauf**	**(Denmark) Simon Birch** **(Austria) Leo Pichler**	(Switzerland) Alexander Fach (Germany) Alexander Schwarzer
1	R2	(Germany) Lausitzring	(Germany) No. 3 Haupt Racing Team	**(Austria) No. 14 Razoon – more than racing**	(Switzerland) No. 4 Fach Auto Tech
1	R2	(Germany) Lausitzring	**(Germany) Niklas Kalus** (Germany) Max Reis	**(Denmark) Simon Birch** **(Austria) Leo Pichler**	(Switzerland) Alexander Fach (Germany) Alexander Schwarzer
2	R1	(Netherlands) Circuit Zandvoort	(Germany) No. 21 SR Motorsport by Schnitzelalm	**(Germany) No.33 Paul Motorsport**	(Germany) No. 8 Liqui Moly Team Engstler by GRT
2	R1	(Netherlands) Circuit Zandvoort	**(Germany) Jannes Fittje** (Germany) Moritz Wiskirchen	**(Germany) Simon Connor Primm** **(Germany) Finn Zulauf**	(Norway) Emil Gjerdrum (Lithuania) Jonas Karklys
2	R2	(Netherlands) Circuit Zandvoort	(Germany) No.33 Paul Motorsport	**(Germany) No.11 FK Performance Motorsport**	(Germany) No. 8 Liqui Moly Team Engstler by GRT
2	R2	(Netherlands) Circuit Zandvoort	(Germany) Simon Connor Primm **(Germany) Finn Zulauf**	**(South Africa) Leyton Fourie** **(Germany) Tim Zimmermann**	(Norway) Emil Gjerdrum (Lithuania) Jonas Karklys
3	R1	(Germany) Nürburgring	(Germany) No. 3 Haupt Racing Team	(Germany) No. 1 Haupt Racing Team	**(Switzerland) No. 4 Fach Auto Tech**
3	R1	(Germany) Nürburgring	**(Germany) Max Reis** (Germany) David Schumacher	(Germany) Salman Owega (Germany) Finn Wiebelhaus	**(Switzerland) Alexander Fach** **(Germany) Alexander Schwarzer**
3	R2	(Germany) Nürburgring	(Germany) No. 1 Haupt Racing Team	**(Germany) No. 1 Haupt Racing Team**	(Switzerland) No. 4 Fach Auto Tech
3	R2	(Germany) Nürburgring	(Germany) Salman Owega **(Germany) Finn Wiebelhaus**	**(Germany) Salman Owega** **(Germany) Finn Wiebelhaus**	(Switzerland) Alexander Fach (Germany) Alexander Schwarzer
4	R1	(Austria) Salzburgring	(Germany) No. 2 Haupt Racing Team	**(Germany) No. 7 Dörr Motorsport**	(Germany) No. 8 Liqui Moly Team Engstler Nord VPN by GRT
4	R1	(Austria) Salzburgring	**(Venezuela) Jonathan Cecotto** (Germany) Dennis Fetzer	**(Germany) Ben Dörr** **(Portugal) Guilherme Oliveira**	(Norway) Emil Gjerdrum (Lithuania) Jonas Karklys
4	R2	(Austria) Salzburgring	(Germany) No.11 FK Performance Motorsport	**(Germany) No.11 FK Performance Motorsport**	(Switzerland) No. 4 Fach Auto Tech
4	R2	(Austria) Salzburgring	(South Africa) **Leyton Fourie** (Germany) Tim Zimmermann	**(South Africa) Leyton Fourie** **(Germany) Tim Zimmermann**	(Switzerland) Alexander Fach (Germany) Alexander Schwarzer
5	R1	(Austria) Red Bull Ring	(Germany) No. 16 Scherer Sport PHX	**(Germany) No. 16 Scherer Sport PHX**	(Germany) No. 8 Liqui Moly Team Engstler Nord VPN by GRT
5	R1	(Austria) Red Bull Ring	(Germany) Denis Bulatov (Germany) **Nico Hantke**	**(Germany) Denis Bulatov** **(Germany) Nico Hantke**	(Norway) Emil Gjerdrum (Lithuania) Jonas Karklys
5	R2	(Austria) Red Bull Ring	(Germany) No. 1 Haupt Racing Team	**(Germany) No. 1 Haupt Racing Team**	(Austria) No. 66 Baron Motorsport
5	R2	(Austria) Red Bull Ring	(Germany) Salman Owega (Germany) **Finn Wiebelhaus**	**(Germany) Salman Owega** **(Germany) Finn Wiebelhaus**	(Italy) Fabrizio Crestani (Austria) Ernst Kirchmayr
6	R1	(Germany) Hockenheimring	**(Austria)** No. 14 Razoon – more than racing	(Germany) **No. 16 Scherer Sport PHX**	(Switzerland) No. 4 Fach Auto Tech
6	R1	(Germany) Hockenheimring	**(Denmark) Simon Birch** (Austria) Leo Pichler	**(Germany) Denis Bulatov** **(Germany) Nico Hantke**	(Switzerland) Alexander Fach (Germany) Alexander Schwarzer
6	R2	(Germany) Hockenheimring	(Switzerland) No. 4 Fach Auto Tech	**(Germany) No. 1 Haupt Racing Team**	(Switzerland) No. 4 Fach Auto Tech
6	R2	(Germany) Hockenheimring	**(Switzerland) Alexander Fach** (Germany) Alexander Schwarzer	**(Germany) Salman Owega** **(Germany) Finn Wiebelhaus**	(Switzerland) Alexander Fach (Germany) Alexander Schwarzer

== Championship standings ==
=== Points system ===
Scoring system

Championship points are awarded for the first fifteen positions in each race. Entries are required to complete 75% of the winning car's race distance in order to be classified and earn points. Individual drivers are required to participate for a minimum of 25 minutes in order to earn championship points in any race.

Position	1st	2nd	3rd	4th	5th	6th	7th	8th	9th	10th	11th	12th	13th	14th	15th
Points	25	20	16	13	11	10	9	8	7	6	5	4	3	2	1
Qualifying	3	2	1												

=== Drivers' standings ===
Pos.	Driver	Team	LAU (Germany)		ZAN (Netherlands)		NÜR (Germany)		SAL (Austria)		RBR (Austria)		HOC (Germany)		Points
1	(Germany) Salman Owega (Germany) Finn Wiebelhaus	(Germany) Haupt Racing Team	2^{2}	4^{2}	5	Ret	2^{2}	1^{1}	7^{2}	3^{2}	2	1^{1}	9	1	212
2	(South Africa) Leyton Fourie (Germany) Tim Zimmermann	(Germany) FK Performance Motorsport	6	8	2	1	7	4	6	1^{1}	11^{3}	8	13	2^{2}	165
3	(Denmark) Simon Birch (Austria) Leo Pichler	(Austria) Razoon – more than racing	1	1	8	10	5	15	4	10^{3}	7	3	2^{1}	10	155
4	(Germany) Denis Bulatov (Germany) Nico Hantke	(Germany) Scherer Sport PHX	5	2	10	8^{3}	9	5	WD	WD	1^{1}	6	1	3^{3}	144
5	(Germany) Juliano Holzem (Germany) Sandro Holzem	(Germany) Schubert Motorsport	10	9	3	11	6^{3}	11^{3}	3	4	4^{2}	2	8^{2}	5	143
6	(Switzerland) Alexander Fach (Germany) Alexander Schwarzer	(Switzerland) Fach Auto Tech	4	10	13	6^{2}	1	3	11^{3}	6	10	9	3	4^{1}	140
7	(Germany) Max Reis	(Germany) Haupt Racing Team	3	Ret^{1}	6	5	4^{1}	2^{2}	13	9	3	5	6	9	134
8	(Germany) Simon Connor Primm (Germany) Finn Zulauf	(Germany) Paul Motorsport	13^{1}	Ret	1^{3}	4^{1}	3	7	5	7	6	Ret	5	11	122
9	(Philippines) Eduardo Coseteng (Germany) Julian Hanses	(Germany) FK Performance Motorsport	9^{3}	6	4	2	12	6	10	5	9	12^{3}	11^{3}	6	117
10	(Germany) Jannes Fittje (Germany) Moritz Wiskirchen	(Germany) SR Motorsport by Schnitzelalm	8	3^{3}	14^{1}	7	10	8	2	14	Ret	10	4	7	111
11	(Germany) Niklas Kalus	(Germany) Haupt Racing Team	3	Ret^{1}	6	5	WD	WD	13	9	3	5	6	9	96
12	(Venezuela) Jonathan Cecotto (Germany) Dennis Fetzer	(Germany) Haupt Racing Team	Ret	5	7	9	Ret	9	8^{1}	8	12	4^{2}	7	8	92
13	(Norway) Emil Gjerdrum (Lithuania) Jonas Karklys	(Germany) Liqui Moly Team Engstler by GRT	7	11	12^{2}	3									79
13	(Norway) Emil Gjerdrum (Lithuania) Jonas Karklys	(Germany) Liqui Moly Team Engstler NordVPN by GRT					8	13	9	Ret	5	14	DSQ	12	79
14	(Germany) Carrie Schreiner (Switzerland) Alain Valente	(Germany) Land-Motorsport	12	7	11	13	Ret	10	12	11	13	15	10	13	55
15	(Germany) David Schumacher	(Germany) Haupt Racing Team					4^{1}	2^{2}							38
16	(Austria) Tim Hütter	(Germany) Liqui Moly Team Engstler by GRT					13	14	Ret	13	16	16	12	14	24
17	(Poland) Szymon Ładniak	(Germany) Liqui Moly Team Engstler by GRT	11	Ret	12	12	13	14							20
18	(Belgium) Baptiste Moulin	(Germany) Liqui Moly Team Engstler by GRT			12	12									8
19	(United States) John Paul Southern Jr.	(Germany) Liqui Moly Team Engstler by GRT											12	14	6
20	(Switzerland) Felix Hirsiger	(Germany) Liqui Moly Team Engstler by GRT									16	16			6
21	(Norway) Strom Gjerdrum	(Germany) Liqui Moly Team Engstler by GRT							Ret	13					5
21	(Netherlands) Dante Rappange	(Germany) Liqui Moly Team Engstler by GRT	11	Ret											5
Guest drivers ineligible to score points
–	(Germany) Ben Dörr (Portugal) Guilherme Oliveira	(Germany) Dörr Motorsport							1	2					–
–	(Austria) Ernst Kirchmayr (Italy) Fabrizio Crestani	(Austria) Baron Motorsport									8	7			–
–	(Austria) Felix Neuhofer	(Germany) Team Joos Sportwagentechnik					11	12							–
–	(Austria) Felix Neuhofer	(Germany) Team Neuhofer Rennsport							Ret	12					–
–	(Germany) Michael Joos	(Germany) Team Joos Sportwagentechnik					11	12							–
–	(Austria) Gerhard Tweraser (Slovakia) Adam Konopka	(Slovakia) ARC Bratislava									14	11			–
–	(Germany) Alfred Renauer	(Germany) Team Neuhofer Rennsport							Ret	12					–
–	(Slovakia) Richard Gonda (Slovakia) Rudolf Beňo	(Czech Republic) Senkyr Motorsport									15	13			–
–	(Italy) Edoardo Bacci (Austria) Philipp Baron	(Austria) Baron Motorsport									WD	WD			–
Pos.	Driver	Team	LAU (Germany)		ZAN (Netherlands)		NÜR (Germany)		SAL (Austria)		RBR (Austria)		HOC (Germany)		Points

=== Teams' standings ===
Pos.	Team	Points
1	(Germany) Haupt Racing Team	351
2	(Germany) FK Performance Motorsport	277
3	(Austria) Razoon – more than racing	155
4	(Germany) Scherer Sport PHX	141
5	(Germany) Schubert Motorsport	138
6	(Switzerland) Fach Auto Tech	136
7	(Germany) Liqui Moly Team Engstler	125
8	(Germany) Paul Motorsport	116
9	(Germany) SR Motorsport by Schnitzelalm	110
10	(Germany) Land-Motorsport	62
