= Niklas Kalus =

German racing driver (born 2005)

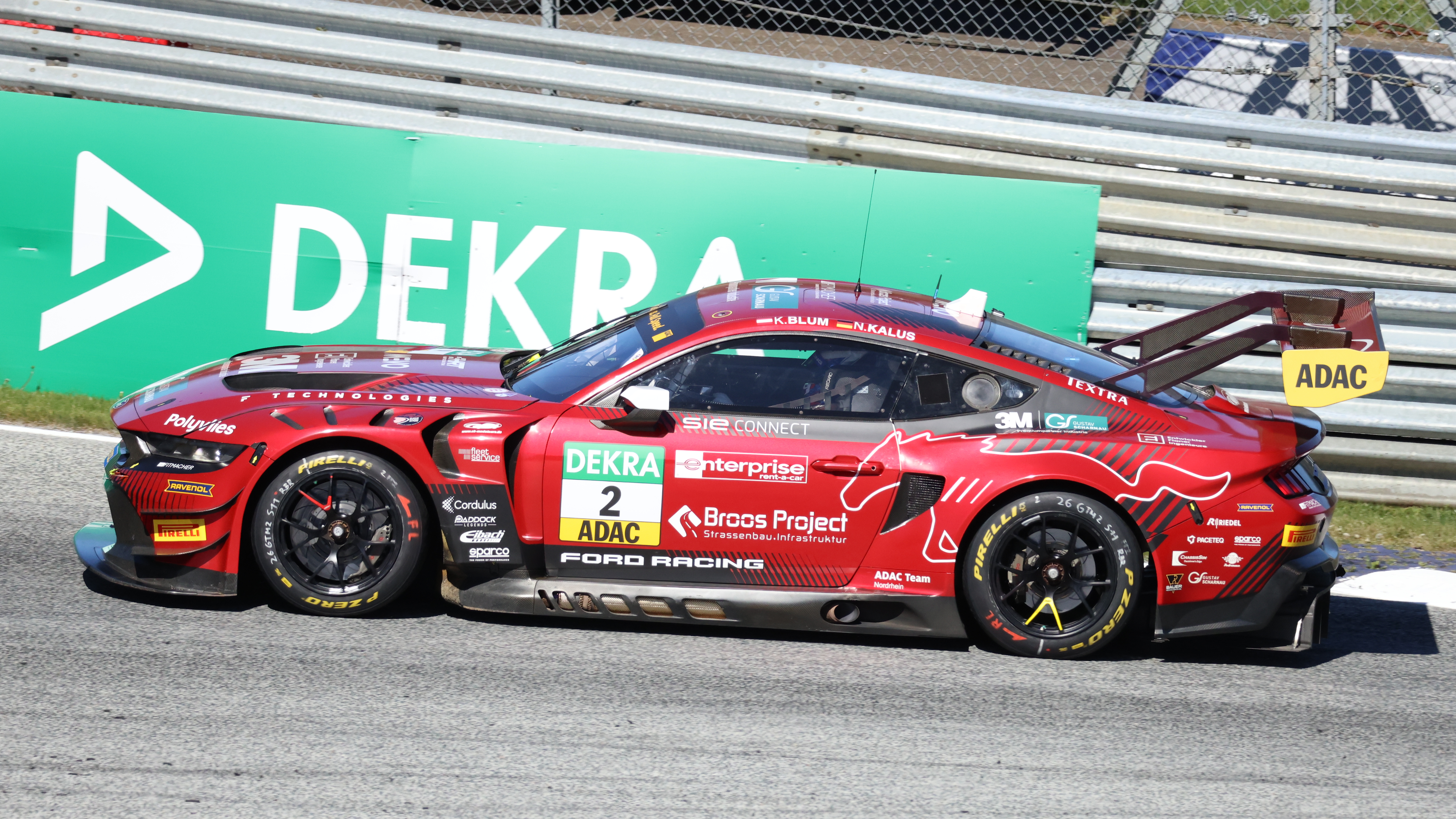
- Kalus in 2026
- Nationality: (Germany) German
- Born: 15 June 2005 (age 21) Duisburg, Germany

ADAC GT Masters career
- Debut season: 2025
- Current team: Haupt Racing Team
- Categorisation: FIA Silver
- Car number: 2
- Starts: 22
- Wins: 1
- Podiums: 8
- Poles: 4
- Fastest laps: 2
- Best finish: 3rd in 2026

Previous series
- 2024 2023: Porsche Sprint Challenge Deutschland; DMV BMW 318ti Cup

Championship titles
- 2023: DMV BMW 318ti Cup – Junior

Niklas Kalus (born 15 June 2005) is a German racing driver who last competed in ADAC GT Masters for Haupt Racing Team.

== Career ==
Kalus began karting in 2014, competing until 2022. Starting in Bambini Light karts, Kalus was runner-up in the 2014 West German Kart Championship (WAKC) standings and also finished fifth in the Boumatic Challenge the same year. Moving up to Bambini for the next two seasons, Kalus most notably finished eighth in the 2015 WAKC standings, before stepping up to OK-J for two seasons, during which he was fifth in the 2018 WAKC standings. Jumping to senior karts for 2019, Kalus most notably finished fifth in the 2020 ADAC Kart Masters, before ending his stint in karts with a fourth-place finish in the 2022 ADAC Kart Bundesendlauf standings.

Kalus stepped up to cars in 2023, entering the DMV BMW 318ti Cup with Morts Racing Team, and scored three wins, overall runner-up honours, and the Junior title. Moving up to GT4 competition in 2024, Kalus raced in Porsche Sprint Challenge Deutschland for SRS Team Sorg Rennsport as part of the series' talent pool, taking 11 wins from 12 starts to finish runner-up. Towards the end of the year, Kalus made a one-off appearance in NXT Gen Cup at the Hockenheimring, in which he placed third.

In 2025, Kalus joined Haupt Racing Team to make his GT3 debut in ADAC GT Masters, sharing a Ford Mustang GT3 with Max Reis. Starting off with a podium and a pole on debut at the Lausitzring, Kalus missed the Nürburgring round due to injury, before bouncing back with third at the Red Bull Ring to end the year 11th overall,

Continuing with HRT and Ford for 2026, Kalus took a win in a GT Winter Series cameo at Valencia alongside Kiano Blum, ahead of his sophomore season in ADAC GT Masters with Blum. After missing out on victory in a photo finish with the No. 63 Lamborghini at the Red Bull Ring, Kalus stood on the podium in round two at Zandvoort. A pair of second-place finishes at the Nürburgring and a third at the Salzburgring then followed, before Kalus scored his maiden series win in race one at Hockenheim to end the year third overall. In August, Kalus made his GT World Challenge Europe Endurance Cup debut at the Nürburgring, in which he notably overtook Thomas Preining and won the Silver Cup class with Eduardo Coseteng and Nicolas Baert.

== Karting record ==
=== Karting career summary ===
Season	Series	Team	Position
2014	ADAC Kart Bundesendlauf — Bambini Light		5th
2016	ADAC Kart Bundesendlauf — Bambini		10th
2018	ADAC Kart Bundesendlauf — OK-J		7th
2019	ADAC Kart Bundesendlauf — X30 Senior		8th
2019	ADAC Kart Cup — X30 Senior		8th
2020	ADAC Kart Masters — X30 Senior		5th
2021	ADAC Kart Masters — X30 Senior		10th
2021	IAME Euro Series — X30 Senior	MS Racing Team	165th
2022	ADAC Kart Bundesendlauf — X30 Senior		4th

== Racing record ==
=== Racing career summary ===
Season	Series	Team	Races	Wins	Poles	F/Laps	Podiums	Points	Position
2023	DMV BMW 318ti Cup	Morts Racing Team	14	3	1	5	5	390	**2nd**
2024	GT4 Winter Series – Am	SRS Team Sorg Rennsport							
2024	Porsche Sprint Challenge Deutschland – GT4	SRS Team Sorg Rennsport	12	11	10	8	11		**2nd**
2024	NXT Gen Cup		2	0	0	0	1	33	17th
2025	ADAC GT Masters	Haupt Racing Team	10	0	1	0	2	96	11th
2026	GT Winter Series – GT3	Haupt Racing Team	3	1	0	0	3	56	15th
2026	ADAC GT Masters	Haupt Racing Team	12	1	3	2	6	163	**3rd**
2026	GT World Challenge Europe Endurance Cup	HRT Ford Racing	1	0	0	0	0	0	NC
2026	GT World Challenge Europe Endurance Cup – Silver	HRT Ford Racing	1	1	0	0	1	25	20th

^{†} As Kalus was a guest driver, he was ineligible to score points.

=== Complete ADAC GT Masters results ===
(key) (Races in bold indicate pole position) (Races in italics indicate fastest lap)

Year	Team	Car	1	2	3	4	5	6	7	8	9	10	11	12	DC	Points
2025	Haupt Racing Team	Ford Mustang GT3	LAU; 1; 3	**LAU**; **2** Ret^{1}	ZAN; 1; 6	ZAN; 2; 5	NÜR; 1 WD	NÜR; 2 WD	SAL; 1; 13	SAL; 2; 9	RBR; 1; 3	RBR; 2; 5	HOC; 1; 6	HOC; 2; 9	11th	96
2026	Haupt Racing Team	Ford Mustang GT3	RBR; 1; 2	RBR; 2; 5	ZAN; 1; 3^{2}	**ZAN**; **2**; 6^{1}	**LAU**; **1** Ret^{1}	LAU; 2; 11	NÜR; 1; 2^{3}	NÜR; 2; 2^{2}	SAL; 1; 3	**SAL**; **2**; 11^{1}	HOC; 1; 1	HOC; 2 Ret^{2}	3rd	163

=== Complete GT World Challenge Europe results ===
==== GT World Challenge Europe Endurance Cup ====
(Races in bold indicate pole position) (Races in italics indicate fastest lap)

Year	Team	Car	Class	1	2	3	4	5	6	7	Pos.	Points
2026	HRT Ford Racing	Ford Mustang GT3 Evo	Silver	LEC	MNZ	SPA; 6H	SPA; 12H	SPA; 24H	NÜR; 13	ALG	20th	25
