= Kiano Blum =

Austrian racing driver (born 2007)

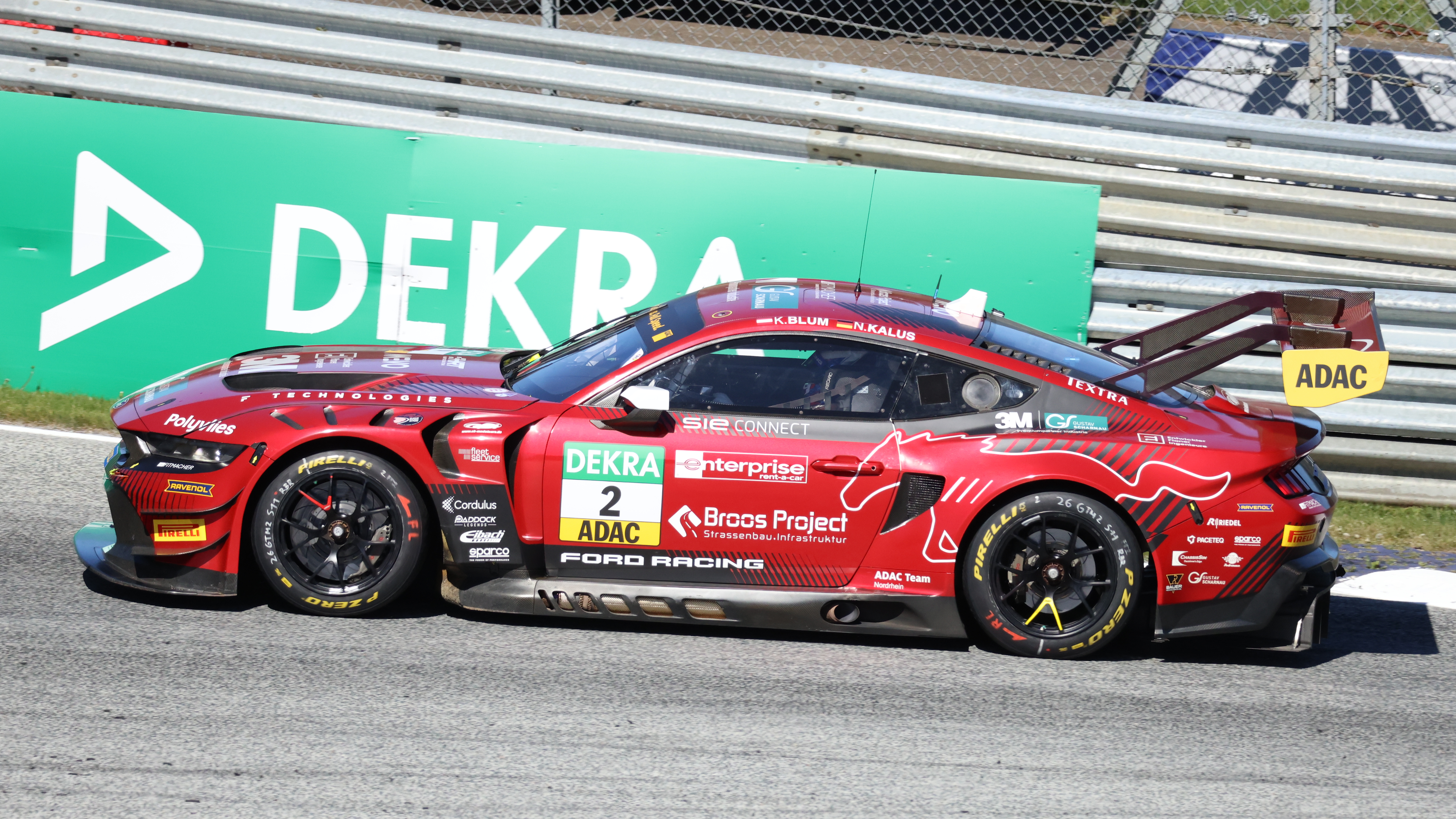
- Blum in 2026
- Nationality: (Austria) Austrian
- Born: 14 May 2007 (age 19) Fußach, Austria

ADAC GT Masters career
- Debut season: 2026
- Current team: Haupt Racing Team
- Categorisation: FIA Silver
- Car number: 2
- Starts: 12
- Wins: 1
- Podiums: 6
- Poles: 3
- Fastest laps: 2
- Best finish: 3rd in 2026

Previous series
- 2024–2025: Porsche Carrera Cup Germany

Kiano Blum (born 14 May 2007) is an Austrian racing driver who last competed in ADAC GT Masters for Haupt Racing Team as a Ford Racing junior.

== Career ==
Blum began his karting career in 2017, securing two DAI Trophies on debut. Starting out in mini karts, Blum most notably finished fourth in the 2018 Andrea Margutti Trophy and the 2019 WSK Open Cup, as well as fifth in the Trofeo delle Industrie the same year. After a quiet stint in junior karts, Blum found more success in senior karts, finishing runner-up in the Deutsche Kart-Meisterschaft in 2022, as well as third in the South Garda Winter Cup and fourth in the WSK Champions Cup in 2023.

In mid-2023, Blum halted his karting career in order to begin testing Porsche Carrera Cup machinery. Blum made his racing debut in early 2024 for Team Race Car Events, competing in the Barcelona finale of the GT Winter Series in the Cup 2 class. Blum then joined ID Racing to enter Porsche Carrera Cup Germany. With limited experience, Blum took a rookie podium at the Hungaroring and a best overall result of ninth at Hockenheim, as he ended the year a lowly 18th in points. In 2025, Blum remained in PCCD with ID Racing, as part of the series' Talent Pool. He matched his best result of ninth twice at the Nürburgring and the Sachsenring, with an improved consistency earning him 13th in the overall standings.

Moving up to the ADAC GT Masters for 2026, Blum joined Haupt Racing Team to share a Ford Mustang GT3 Evo with Niklas Kalus, as a new member of the Ford Racing Driver Development Team. Following a win at Valencia in the GT Winter Series, Blum missed out on a debut win in GT Masters in a photo finish with the No. 63 Lamborghini at the Red Bull Ring. Blum then took his first pole positions at Zandvoort and the Lausitzring, and followed them up with a pair of second-place finishes at the Nürburgring. A pole and a podium then followed at the Salzburgring, before Blum capped off the year with a win at the Hockenheimring to take third in overall points. Elsewhere, Blum won the VT2-RWD class on his NLS debut, and entered the final two rounds of GT4 Europe, taking a podium at Zandvoort.

== Karting record ==
=== Karting career summary ===
Season	Series	Team	Position
2017	Trofeo delle Industrie – 60 Mini	Maranello Kart	26th
2018	WSK Champions Cup – 60 Mini	SRP Racing Team	NC
2018	WSK Super Master Series – 60 Mini	Gamoto ASD	56th
2018	Andrea Margutti Trophy – 60 Mini	SRP Racing Team	4th
2018	WSK Open Cup – 60 Mini	SRP Racing Team	25th
2018	WSK Champions Cup – 60 Mini	SRP Racing Team	88th
2019	WSK Champions Cup – 60 Mini	SRP Racing Team	32nd
2019	South Garda Winter Cup – Mini ROK	SRP Racing Team	35th
2019	ADAC Kart Masters – Bambini		10th
2019	WSK Open Cup – 60 Mini	Team Driver Racing Kart	4th
2019	Trofeo delle Industrie – 60 Mini	Team Driver Racing Kart	5th
2019	WSK Final Cup – 60 Mini	Team Driver Racing Kart	NC
2020	Karting European Championship – OK-J	TB Racing Team	58th
2020	ADAC Kart Masters – OK-J		18th
2021	WSK Champions Cup – OK-J	TB Racing Team	NC
2021	Champions of the Future – OK-J	TB Racing Team	29th
2021	Deutsche Kart-Meisterschaft – OK-J	TB Racing Team	31st
2021	Karting European Championship – OK-J	TB Racing Team	NC
2021	Deutsche Kart-Meisterschaft – OK	TB Racing Team	8th
2021	ADAC Kart Masters – OK	TB Racing Team	14th
2021	South Garda Winter Cup – OK	TB Racing Team	17th
2021	WSK Final Cup – OK	KR Motorsport	10th
2022	WSK Super Master Series – OK	TB Racing Team	70th
2022	Deutsche Kart-Meisterschaft – OK	TB Racing Team	2nd
2022	Champions of the Future Euro Series – OK	TB Racing Team	87th
2022	Karting European Championship – OK	DPK Racing	96th
2022	WSK Euro Series – OK	DPK Racing	27th
2022	WSK Open Cup – OK	DPK Racing	13th
2022	WSK Final Cup – OK	DPK Racing	54th
2022	LeCont Trophy – OK		8th
2023	South Garda Winter Cup – OK	DPK Racing	3rd
2023	WSK Champions Cup – OK	DPK Racing	4th
2023	WSK Super Master Series – OK	DPK Racing	16th
2023	Champions of the Future Euro Series – OK	DPK Racing	53rd
2023	Karting European Championship – OK	DPK Racing	75th

== Racing record ==
=== Racing career summary ===
Season	Series	Team	Races	Wins	Poles	F/Laps	Podiums	Points	Position
2024	GT Winter Series – Cup 2	Team Race Car Events	3	0	1	0	0	3.925	16th
2024	Porsche Carrera Cup Germany	ID Racing	15	0	0	0	0	21	18th
2025	Porsche Carrera Cup Germany	ID Racing	16	0	0	0	0	46	13th
2026	GT Winter Series – GT3	Haupt Racing Team	6	1	0	0	5	100	5th
2026	ADAC GT Masters	Haupt Racing Team	12	1	3	2	6	163	**3rd**
2026	Nürburgring Langstrecken-Serie – VT2-RWD	SRS Team Sorg Rennsport	1	1	0	0	1	15*	NC*
2026	GT4 European Series – Silver	TeamFloral	4	0	0	0	1	0	NC†

^{†} As Blum was a guest driver, he was ineligible to score points.

=== Complete Porsche Carrera Cup Germany results ===
(key) (Races in bold indicate pole position) (Races in italics indicate fastest lap)

Year	Team	1	2	3	4	5	6	7	8	9	10	11	12	13	14	15	16	DC	Points
2024	ID Racing	IMO; 1; 17	IMO; 2; 16	OSC; 1 Ret	OSC; 2 DNS	ZAN; 1; 14	ZAN; 2; 15	HUN; 1; 13	HUN; 2; 20	NÜR; 1; 13	NÜR; 2; 18	SAC; 1; 13	SAC; 2 DSQ	RBR; 1; 18	RBR; 2 Ret	HOC; 1; 9	HOC; 2; 15	18th	21
2025	ID Racing	IMO; 1 Ret	IMO; 2; 15	SPA; 1; 12	SPA; 2; 24	ZAN; 1; 16	ZAN; 2 Ret	NOR; 1; 18	NOR; 2; 13	NÜR; 1; 9	NÜR; 2; 10	SAC; 1; 9	SAC; 2; 17	RBR; 1; 14	RBR; 2; 11	HOC; 1; 11	HOC; 2; 14	13th	46

=== Complete ADAC GT Masters results ===
(key) (Races in bold indicate pole position) (Races in italics indicate fastest lap)

Year	Team	Car	1	2	3	4	5	6	7	8	9	10	11	12	DC	Points
2026	Haupt Racing Team	Ford Mustang GT3	RBR; 1; 2	RBR; 2; 5	ZAN; 1; 3^{2}	**ZAN**; **2**; 6^{1}	**LAU**; **1** Ret^{1}	LAU; 2; 11	NÜR; 1; 2^{3}	NÜR; 2; 2^{2}	SAL; 1; 3	**SAL**; **2**; 11^{1}	HOC; 1; 1	HOC; 2 Ret^{2}	3rd	163

=== Complete GT4 European Series results ===
(key) (Races in bold indicate pole position) (Races in italics indicate fastest lap)

Year	Team	Car	Class	1	2	3	4	5	6	7	8	9	10	11	12	Pos	Points
2026	TeamFloral	Ford Mustang GT4 (S650)	Silver	LEC; 1	LEC; 2	MNZ; 1	MNZ; 2	SPA; 1	SPA; 2	MIS; 1	MIS; 2	ZAN; 1; 6	ZAN; 2; 2	ALG; 1; 5	ALG; 2 Ret	NC†	0†
