= 2024 Porsche Carrera Cup Germany =

Racing series in Germany

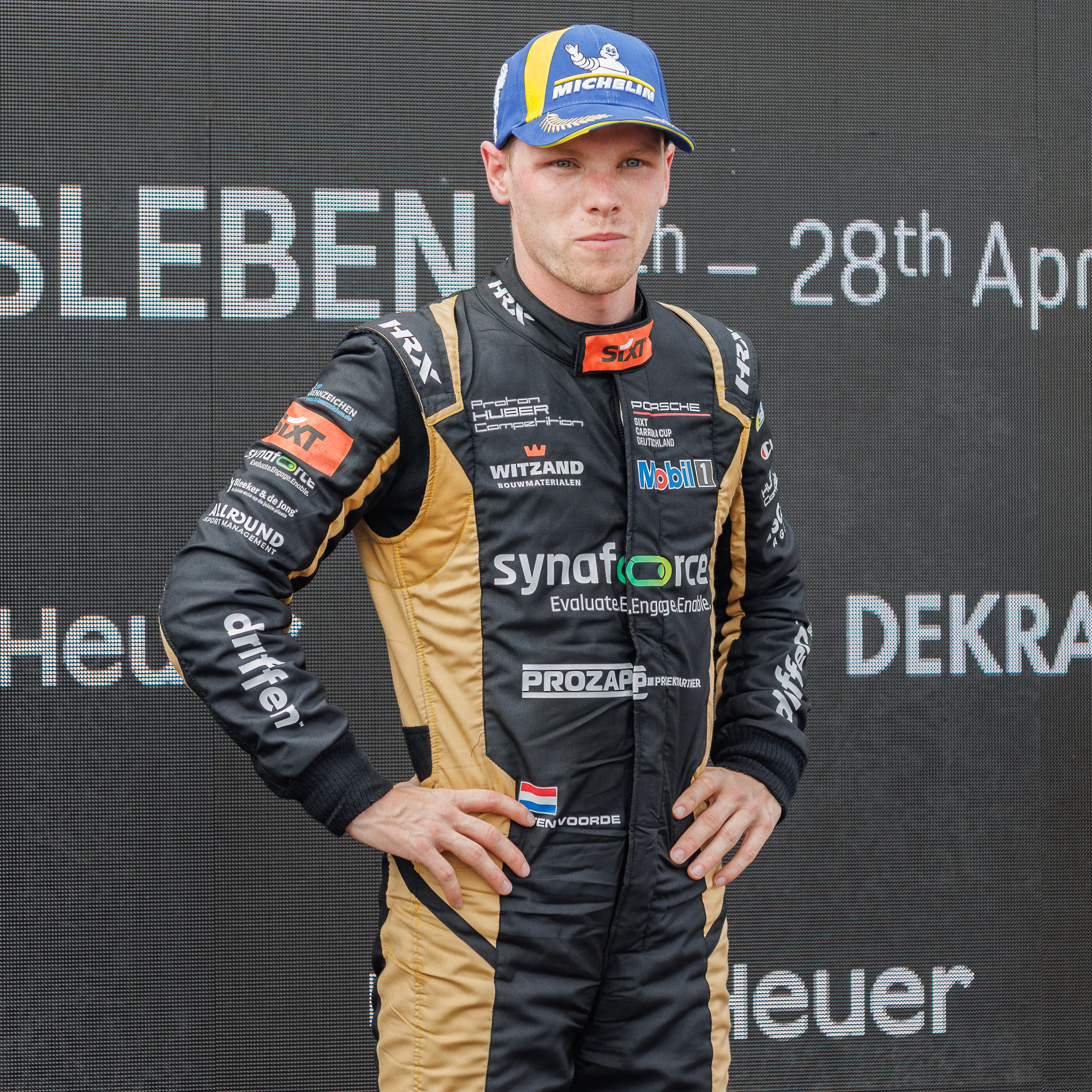
Larry ten Voorde took his third Drivers' Championship title

The 2024 Porsche Sixt Carrera Cup Germany was the 39th season of the Porsche Carrera Cup Germany. The season began at Autodromo Enzo e Dino Ferrari on 19 April and ended at Hockenheimring on 22 October.

== Calendar ==
Round	Circuit	Date	Supporting	Map of circuit locations
1	Autodromo Enzo e Dino Ferrari, Imola, Italy	19–21 April	FIA World Endurance Championship; Lamborghini Super Trofeo Europe	2024 Porsche Carrera Cup Germany is located in Europe
2	Motorsport Arena Oschersleben, Oschersleben, Germany	26–28 April	Deutsche Tourenwagen Masters; ADAC GT Masters	2024 Porsche Carrera Cup Germany is located in Europe
3	Circuit Zandvoort, Zandvoort, Netherlands	7–9 June	Deutsche Tourenwagen Masters; Formula Regional European Championship; Porsche Carrera Cup Benelux; ADAC GT Masters	2024 Porsche Carrera Cup Germany is located in Europe
4	Hungaroring, Mogyoród, Hungary	21–23 June	International GT Open; Formula Regional European Championship; Euroformula Open; GB3 Championship	2024 Porsche Carrera Cup Germany is located in Europe
5	Nürburgring, Nürburg, Germany	16–18 August	Deutsche Tourenwagen Masters; Prototype Cup Germany	2024 Porsche Carrera Cup Germany is located in Europe
6	Sachsenring, Hohenstein-Ernstthal, Germany	6–8 September	Deutsche Tourenwagen Masters; Prototype Cup Germany	2024 Porsche Carrera Cup Germany is located in Europe
7	Red Bull Ring, Spielberg, Austria	27–29 September	Deutsche Tourenwagen Masters; ADAC GT Masters	2024 Porsche Carrera Cup Germany is located in Europe
8	Hockenheimring, Hockenheim, Germany	18–20 October	Deutsche Tourenwagen Masters; ADAC GT Masters	2024 Porsche Carrera Cup Germany is located in Europe

== Entry list ==
Team	No.	Driver	Class	Rounds
(Germany) Proton Huber Competition (Note: Cars No. 1, 13 and 31 entered as Proton Huber Competition and cars No. 16 and 88 entered as Team Proton Huber Competition.) (Germany) Team Proton Huber Competition	1	(Netherlands) Larry ten Voorde	P	All
(Germany) Proton Huber Competition (Germany) Team Proton Huber Competition	13	(Germany) Alexander Tauscher	P	All
(Germany) Proton Huber Competition (Germany) Team Proton Huber Competition	16	(Netherlands) Flynt Schuring	P	All
(Germany) Proton Huber Competition (Germany) Team Proton Huber Competition	31	(Germany) Sebastian Freymuth	P	All
(Germany) Proton Huber Competition (Germany) Team Proton Huber Competition	88	(Austria) Horst Felix Felbermayr	P	All
(Germany) Allied-Racing	3	(Netherlands) Nathan Schaap	R	All
(Germany) Allied-Racing	19	(United Kingdom) Harry King	P	All
(Germany) Allied-Racing	26	(Germany) Egor Litvinenko	R	8
(Germany) Allied-Racing	60	(Denmark) Alexander Hartvig	R	1–2
(Germany) Allied-Racing	99	(Denmark) Robert Schlünssen	PA	7
(Netherlands) GP Elite (Note: Cars No. 5 and 22 entered as GP Elite and cars No. 23, 24 and 25 entered as UNISERVER by Team GP Elite.) (Netherlands) UNISERVER by Team GP Elite	5	(Germany) Sören Spreng	PA	All
(Netherlands) GP Elite (Netherlands) UNISERVER by Team GP Elite	22	(Australia) Samer Shahin	PA	1, 4
(Netherlands) GP Elite (Netherlands) UNISERVER by Team GP Elite	23	(Netherlands) Huub van Eijndhoven	P	All
(Netherlands) GP Elite (Netherlands) UNISERVER by Team GP Elite	24	(Netherlands) Kas Haverkort	R	All
(Netherlands) GP Elite (Netherlands) UNISERVER by Team GP Elite	25	(Israel) Ariel Levi	P	All
(Italy) Target Competition	12	(Netherlands) Senna van Soelen	P	All
(Italy) Target Competition	21	(France) Marvin Klein	P	1–5, 7–8
(Germany) TEAM 75 Bernhard	14	(Netherlands) Robert de Haan	R	All
(Germany) TEAM 75 Bernhard	15	(Germany) Janne Stiak	P	All
(Switzerland) Fach Auto Tech	30	(Switzerland) Felix Hirsiger	P	8
(Germany) Bonk Motorsport	34	(Germany) Theo Oeverhaus	P	All
(Germany) Bonk Motorsport	43	(Poland) Karol Kręt	R	1–6, 8
(Germany) ID Racing	42	(Austria) Kiano Blum	R	All
(Germany) ID Racing	44	(United Kingdom) James Kellett	P	All
(Germany) ID Racing	45	(Germany) Christof Langer	PA	6, 8
(Estonia) EST1 Racing	47	(Estonia) Alexander Reimann	R	5
(Estonia) EST1 Racing	80	(Venezuela) Angelo Fontana	PA	5
(Germany) CarTech Motorsport	54	(Germany) Michael Essmann	PA	All
(Germany) CarTech Motorsport	55	(Germany) Colin Bönighausen	R	All
(Germany) CarTech Motorsport	65	(Germany) Kai Pfister	PA	5–8
(Germany) CarTech Motorsport	84	(Kuwait) Ahmad Al Shehab	PA	1–4
(Austria) HP Racing International – a-workx	91	(Germany) Gian Luca Tüccaroglu	R	All
(Austria) HP Racing International – a-workx	98	(Germany) Jan Seyffert	P	All

Icon	Class
P	Pro Cup
PA	Pro-Am Cup
R	Rookie
	Guest Starter

== Results ==
Round		Circuit	Pole position	Fastest lap	Overall winner	Winning team	Rookie winner	Pro-Am winner
1	R1	(Italy) Autodromo Enzo e Dino Ferrari	(Netherlands) Huub van Eijndhoven	(Netherlands) Larry ten Voorde	(United Kingdom) Harry King (Note: Larry ten Voorde originally won the race but later received a 4 second time penalty. Harry King, initially classified second, thus inherited the win.)	(Germany) Allied-Racing	(Netherlands) Robert de Haan	(Germany) Sören Spreng
1	R2	(Italy) Autodromo Enzo e Dino Ferrari	(Germany) Theo Oeverhaus	(Netherlands) Larry ten Voorde	(United Kingdom) Harry King	(Germany) Allied-Racing	(Netherlands) Flynt Schuring	(Germany) Sören Spreng
2	R1	(Germany) Motorsport Arena Oschersleben	(Netherlands) Robert de Haan	(Netherlands) Robert de Haan	(Netherlands) Robert de Haan	(Germany) TEAM 75 Bernhard	(Netherlands) Robert de Haan	(Germany) Sören Spreng
2	R2	(Germany) Motorsport Arena Oschersleben	(Netherlands) Robert de Haan	(Netherlands) Larry ten Voorde	(Netherlands) Larry ten Voorde	(Germany) Proton Huber Competition	(Netherlands) Kas Haverkort	(Germany) Michael Essmann
3	R1	(Netherlands) Circuit Zandvoort	(Netherlands) Larry ten Voorde	(United Kingdom) Harry King	(Netherlands) Larry ten Voorde	(Germany) Proton Huber Competition	(Netherlands) Kas Haverkort	(Germany) Sören Spreng
3	R2	(Netherlands) Circuit Zandvoort	(Netherlands) Huub van Eijndhoven	(Netherlands) Huub van Eijndhoven	(Netherlands) Larry ten Voorde	(Germany) Proton Huber Competition	(Netherlands) Robert de Haan	(Kuwait) Ahmad Al Shehab
4	R1	(Hungary) Hungaroring	(France) Marvin Klein	(France) Marvin Klein	(France) Marvin Klein	(Italy) Target Competition	(Netherlands) Robert de Haan	(Kuwait) Ahmad Al Shehab
4	R2	(Hungary) Hungaroring	(Netherlands) Kas Haverkort	(Netherlands) Kas Haverkort	(Netherlands) Kas Haverkort	(Netherlands) UNISERVER by Team GP Elite	(Netherlands) Kas Haverkort	(Germany) Sören Spreng
5	R1	(Germany) Nürburgring	(Netherlands) Larry ten Voorde	(Germany) Alexander Tauscher	(United Kingdom) Harry King	(Germany) Allied-Racing	(Netherlands) Robert de Haan	(Germany) Sören Spreng
5	R2	(Germany) Nürburgring	(Germany) Alexander Tauscher	(Netherlands) Larry ten Voorde	(Germany) Alexander Tauscher	(Germany) Proton Huber Competition	(Netherlands) Robert de Haan	(Germany) Michael Essmann
6	R1	(Germany) Sachsenring	(Germany) Theo Oeverhaus	(Netherlands) Kas Haverkort	(Germany) Theo Oeverhaus	(Germany) Bonk Motorsport	(Netherlands) Flynt Schuring	(Germany) Sören Spreng
6	R2	(Germany) Sachsenring	(Germany) Janne Stiak	(Germany) Janne Stiak	(Germany) Janne Stiak	(Germany) TEAM 75 Bernhard	(Netherlands) Senna van Soelen	(Germany) Sören Spreng
7	R1	(Austria) Red Bull Ring	(Germany) Alexander Tauscher	(Netherlands) Kas Haverkort	(United Kingdom) Harry King	(Germany) Allied-Racing	(Netherlands) Kas Haverkort	(Germany) Michael Essmann
7	R2	(Austria) Red Bull Ring	(Netherlands) Flynt Schuring	(United Kingdom) Harry King	(Netherlands) Flynt Schuring	(Germany) Team Proton Huber Competition	(Netherlands) Flynt Schuring	(Germany) Michael Essmann
8	R1	(Germany) Hockenheimring	(Netherlands) Huub van Eijndhoven	(Netherlands) Robert de Haan	(Netherlands) Huub van Eijndhoven	(Netherlands) UNISERVER by Team GP Elite	(Netherlands) Robert de Haan	(Germany) Sören Spreng
8	R2	(Germany) Hockenheimring	(Israel) Ariel Levi	(Netherlands) Robert de Haan	(Israel) Ariel Levi	(Netherlands) UNISERVER by Team GP Elite	(Netherlands) Flynt Schuring	(Germany) Michael Essmann

== Championship standings ==
=== Scoring system ===
In Pro-Am class only 12 drivers receive points.

Position	**1st**	**2nd**	**3rd**	**4th**	**5th**	**6th**	**7th**	**8th**	**9th**	**10th**	**11th**	**12th**	**13th**	**14th**	**15th**
Points	25	20	16	13	11	10	9	8	7	6	5	4	3	2	1

=== Overall ===
Pos.	Driver	Team	IMO (Italy)		OSC (Germany)		ZND (Netherlands)		HUN (Hungary)		NÜR (Germany)		SAC (Germany)		RBR (Austria)		HOC (Germany)		Points
1	(Netherlands) Larry ten Voorde	(Germany) Proton Huber Competition	2	2	8	1	**1**	1	2	6	**2**	2	3	2	3	4	6	6	278
2	(United Kingdom) Harry King	(Germany) Allied-Racing	1	1	6	2	2	4	5	9	1	4	7	Ret	1	2	2	9	250
3	(Germany) Theo Oeverhaus	(Germany) Bonk Motorsport	6	**Ret**	4	4	3	3	4	2	4	11	**1**	4	9	9	Ret	2	191
4	(Netherlands) Huub van Eijndhoven	(Netherlands) UNISERVER by Team GP Elite	**5**	6	5	3	19	**20**	14	10	8	7	2	3	6	5	**1**	3	171
5	(Netherlands) Robert de Haan	(Germany) TEAM 75 Bernhard	3	14	**1**	**Ret**	Ret	2	3	3	3	3	15	8	16	8	3	18	160
6	(Israel) Ariel Levi	(Netherlands) UNISERVER by Team GP Elite	DSQ	4	3	15	7	13	6	4	6	9	5	5	10	6	Ret	**1**	145
7	(Netherlands) Kas Haverkort	(Netherlands) UNISERVER by Team GP Elite	7	Ret	13	5	4	6	8	**1**	25	12	8	10	2	3	20	13	137
8	(Netherlands) Flynt Schuring	(Germany) Team Proton Huber Competition	10	7	10	20	5	8	Ret	7	5	8	4	12	14	**1**	5	4	136
9	(Germany) Alexander Tauscher	(Germany) Proton Huber Competition	8	13	7	9	6	5	10	8	Ret	**1**	19	6	**4**	16	Ret	5	121
10	(France) Marvin Klein	(Italy) Target Competition	4	3	Ret	6	12	DSQ	**1**	5	9	6			11	13	7	Ret	113
11	(Germany) Janne Stiak	(Germany) TEAM 75 Bernhard	12	9	2	7	Ret	Ret	7	13	16	5	DSQ	**1**	Ret	14	16	Ret	91
12	(United Kingdom) James Kellett	(Germany) ID Racing	9	8	12	8	9	9	9	12	15	14	Ret	11	7	11	4	Ret	87
13	(Netherlands) Senna van Soelen	(Italy) Target Competition	13	11	11	10	10	14	Ret	18	12	15	6	7	5	7	8	Ret	79
14	(Germany) Colin Bönighausen	(Germany) CarTech Motorsport	Ret	12	Ret	12	11	7	16	11	10	10	Ret	9	8	10	Ret	7	69
15	(Germany) Sebastian Freymuth	(Germany) Proton Huber Competition	11	10	17	Ret	Ret	12	12	14	7	Ret	20	20	13	15	14	8	45
16	(Netherlands) Nathan Schaap	(Germany) Allied-Racing	16	Ret	16	14	8	10	15	19	19	13	12	14	12	12	Ret	Ret	34
17	(Germany) Jan Seyffert	(Austria) HP Racing International – a-workx	15	Ret	9	11	Ret	11	11	15	20	Ret	Ret	13	15	Ret	Ret	Ret	28
18	(Austria) Kiano Blum	(Germany) ID Racing	17	16	Ret	DNS	14	15	13	20	13	18	13	DSQ	18	Ret	9	15	21
19	(Austria) Horst Felix Felbermayr	(Germany) Team Proton Huber Competition	14	5	Ret	19	Ret	16	20	17	11	Ret	14	Ret	17	21	Ret	Ret	20
20	(Germany) Gian Luca Tüccaroglu	(Austria) HP Racing International – a-workx	19	19	Ret	16	13	17	17	16	14	16	11	15	Ret	17	12	Ret	16
21	(Germany) Sören Spreng	(Netherlands) GP Elite	20	17	18	21	15	21	22	22	17	Ret	10	16	21	22	11	16	14
22	(Poland) Karol Kręt	(Germany) Bonk Motorsport	18	15	15	18	18	Ret	DNS	21	18	19	9	Ret			18	14	12
23	(Germany) Michael Essmann	(Germany) CarTech Motorsport	21	18	DNS	17	17	19	19	23	21	20	16	18	19	18	13	12	9
24	(Germany) Egor Litvinenko	(Germany) Allied-Racing															15	10	8
25	(Denmark) Alexander Hartvig	(Germany) Allied-Racing	Ret	21	14	13													5
26	(Kuwait) Ahmad Al Shehab	(Germany) CarTech Motorsport	22	20	19	22	16	18	18	25									0
27	(Germany) Kai Pfister	(Germany) CarTech Motorsport									22	21	17	17	20	19	17	DNS	0
28	(Denmark) Robert Schlünssen	(Germany) Allied-Racing													22	20			0
Guest drivers ineligible to score points
–	(Switzerland) Felix Hirsiger	(Switzerland) Fach Auto Tech															10	11	–
–	(Germany) Christof Langer	(Germany) ID Racing											18	19			19	17	–
–	(Estonia) Alexander Reimann	(Estonia) EST1 Racing									23	17							–
–	(Australia) Samer Shahin	(Netherlands) GP Elite	23	22					21	24									–
–	(Venezuela) Angelo Fontana	(Estonia) EST1 Racing									24	22							–
Pos.	Driver	Team	IMO (Italy)		OSC (Germany)		ZND (Netherlands)		HUN (Hungary)		NÜR (Germany)		SAC (Germany)		RBR (Austria)		HOC (Germany)		Points

Colour	Result
Gold	Winner
Silver	Second place
Bronze	Third place
Green	Points classification
Blue	Non-points classification
Blue	Non-classified finish (NC)
Purple	Retired, not classified (Ret)
Red	Did not qualify (DNQ)
Red	Did not pre-qualify (DNPQ)
Black	Disqualified (DSQ)
White	Did not start (DNS)
White	Withdrew (WD)
White	Race cancelled (C)
Blank	Did not practice (DNP)
Blank	Did not arrive (DNA)
Blank	Excluded (EX)

**Bold** – Pole
Italics – Fastest Lap
† — Did not finish, but classified

=== Pro-Am ===
Pos.	Driver	Team	IMO (Italy)		OSC (Germany)		ZND (Netherlands)		HUN (Hungary)		NÜR (Germany)		SAC (Germany)		RBR (Austria)		HOC (Germany)		Points
1	(Germany) Sören Spreng	(Netherlands) GP Elite	**1**	**1**	**1**	**2**	1	3	4	**1**	1	Ret	**1**	1	**3**	**4**	**1**	2	167
2	(Germany) Michael Essmann	(Germany) CarTech Motorsport	2	2	DNS	1	3	2	2	2	2	1	2	**3**	1	1	2	**1**	161
3	(Kuwait) Ahmad Al Shehab	(Germany) CarTech Motorsport	3	3	2	3	**2**	**1**	**1**	4									78
4	(Germany) Kai Pfister	(Germany) CarTech Motorsport									3	2	3	2	2	2	3	DNS	64
5	(Denmark) Robert Schlünssen	(Germany) Allied-Racing													4	3			14
Guest drivers ineligible to score points
–	(Australia) Samer Shahin	(Netherlands) GP Elite	4	4					3	3									–
–	(Venezuela) Angelo Fontana	(Estonia) EST1 Racing									4	3							–
–	(Germany) Christof Langer	(Germany) ID Racing											4	4			4	3	–
Pos.	Driver	Team	IMO (Italy)		OSC (Germany)		ZND (Netherlands)		HUN (Hungary)		NÜR (Germany)		SAC (Germany)		RBR (Austria)		HOC (Germany)		Points

=== Rookie ===
Pos.	Driver	Team	IMO (Italy)		OSC (Germany)		ZND (Netherlands)		HUN (Hungary)		NÜR (Germany)		SAC (Germany)		RBR (Austria)		HOC (Germany)		Points
1	(Netherlands) Flynt Schuring	(Germany) Team Proton Huber Competition	3	1	2	8	2	4	Ret	3	2	2	**1**	5	5	**1**	2	1	275
2	(Netherlands) Robert de Haan	(Germany) TEAM 75 Bernhard	**1**	**4**	**1**	**Ret**	**Ret**	**1**	**1**	2	**1**	**1**	8	2	6	4	1	**7**	268
3	(Netherlands) Kas Haverkort	(Netherlands) UNISERVER by Team GP Elite	2	Ret	4	1	1	2	2	**1**	10	4	3	4	**1**	2	**8**	4	263
4	(Netherlands) Senna van Soelen	(Italy) Target Competition	4	2	3	2	4	6	Ret	6	4	6	2	1	2	3	3	Ret	222
5	(Germany) Colin Bönighausen	(Germany) CarTech Motorsport	Ret	3	Ret	3	5	3	5	4	3	3	Ret	**3**	3	5	Ret	2	178
6	(Netherlands) Nathan Schaap	(Germany) Allied-Racing	5	Ret	7	5	3	5	4	7	8	5	6	6	4	6	Ret	Ret	142
7	(Germany) Gian Luca Tüccaroglu	(Austria) HP Racing International – a-workx	8	7	Ret	6	6	8	6	5	6	7	5	7	Ret	7	5	Ret	125
8	(Austria) Kiano Blum	(Germany) ID Racing	6	6	Ret	DNS	7	7	3	8	5	9	7	DSQ	7	Ret	4	6	122
9	(Poland) Karol Kręt	(Germany) Bonk Motorsport	7	5	6	7	8	Ret	DNS	9	7	10	4	Ret			7	5	102
10	(Denmark) Alexander Hartvig	(Germany) Allied-Racing	Ret	8	5	4													32
11	(Germany) Egor Litvinenko	(Germany) Allied-Racing															6	3	26
Guest drivers ineligible to score points
–	(Estonia) Alexander Reimann	(Estonia) EST1 Racing									9	8							–
Pos.	Driver	Team	IMO (Italy)		OSC (Germany)		ZND (Netherlands)		HUN (Hungary)		NÜR (Germany)		SAC (Germany)		RBR (Austria)		HOC (Germany)		Points

=== Teams ===
Pos.	Team	Points
1	(Germany) Proton Huber Competition	416
2	(Netherlands) UNISERVER by Team GP Elite	404
3	(Germany) Allied-Racing	306
4	(Germany) TEAM 75 Bernhard	260
5	(Germany) Bonk Motorsport	209
6	(Italy) Target Competition	198
7	(Germany) Team Proton Huber Competition	164
8	(Germany) ID Racing	120
9	(Germany) CarTech Motorsport	85
10	(Austria) HP Racing International – a-workx	59
11	(Netherlands) GP Elite	19
