= Max Reis (racing driver) =

German racing driver (born 2007)

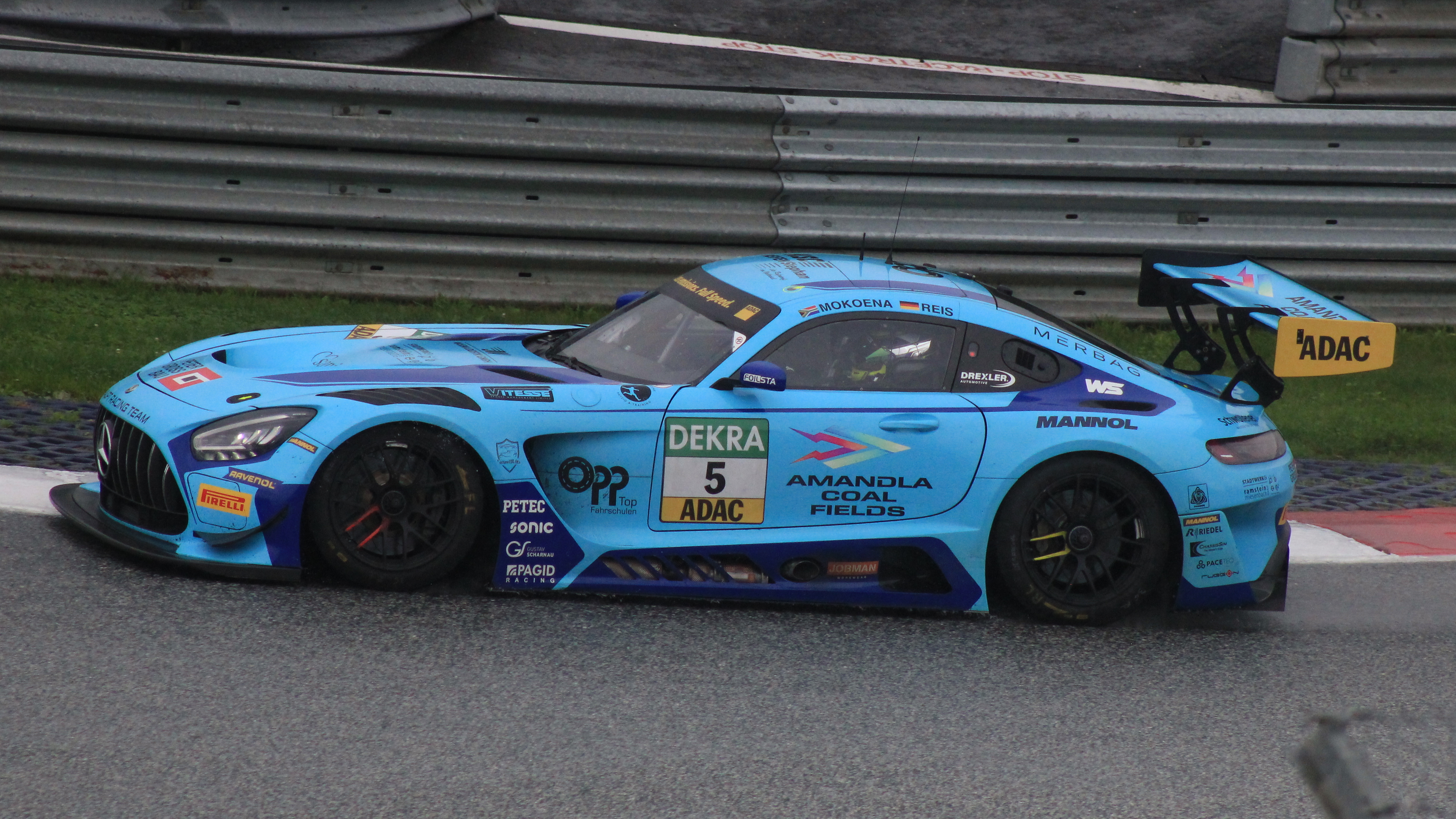
- Reis in 2024
- Nationality: (Germany) German
- Born: 28 January 2007 (age 19) Ramstein-Miesenbach, Germany
- Categorisation: FIA Silver

Max Reis (born 28 January 2007) is a German racing driver who last competed for Haupt Racing Team in ADAC GT Masters.

== Early career ==
Reis began karting in 2015. Racing in Kart Slalom competitions in his first two years in karting, he was the Junior and vice champion of the Rheinland-Pfalz series in his rookie year, before winning the German championship a year later. Reis then joined Team Kali Kart Germany for 2017, winning the Graf-Berghe-von-Trips memorial in the Rotax Micro class at the end of the year.

Switching to Nees Racing for 2018, Reis won the ACV Kart Nationals and the RMC Germany title, along with a second win in the Graf-Berghe-von-Trips memorial and his only participation in the Rotax Max Challenge Grand Finals at season's end. Reis continued in karting for two more years, winning the RMC Clubsport title in 2019 and taking his third consecutive Graf-Berghe-von-Trips memorial win that same year before ending his karting career with a ninth-place points finish in the 2020 ADAC Kart Masters.

After testing Formula 4 machinery in 2021, Reis made his single-seater debut in 2022, racing in the FFSA Academy-centrally run French F4 Championship. In his maiden season in single-seaters, he took his maiden podium at Pau by finishing second in race two, which helped him to finish 15th in points at season's end. Reis returned to the series in 2023 as one of three representatives of the ADAC Junior Team. In his sophomore season, Reis once again scored just one podium throughout the season, a third-place finish in race one at Lédenon, and ended the season 14th in points.

== GT career ==
Reis moved to ADAC GT Masters for 2024, joining Mercedes-fielding Haupt Racing Team alongside Kwanda Mokoena. In his maiden season in sports cars, Reis finished third on debut at Oschersleben, which was his only podium of the season, and took his maiden pole position at the Red Bull Ring en route to a 13th-place points finish at season's end.

Despite Haupt Racing Team switching to Ford for 2025, Reis returned to the team for his sophomore season in ADAC GT Masters, this time alongside Niklas Kalus. After finishing third at the season-opening race at Lausitzring, Reis qualified on pole for race one at the Nürburgring two rounds later and finished second in race two to exit the round third in points. Reis then stood on the podium only once in the following three rounds, doing so in race one at the Red Bull Ring by finishing third, en route to a seventh-place points finish at season's end.

The following year, Reis remained with HRT for a third season in ADAC GT Masters, as well as select appearances in the GT World Challenge Europe Endurance Cup. After scoring two podiums at the Lausitzring in the former, as well as competing at the 24 Hours of Spa, Reis was forced to sat out the rest of the year on financial grounds.

== Karting record ==
=== Karting career summary ===
Season	Series	Team	Position
2016	Deutsche Kartslalom Meisterschaft – K1		1st
2017	ACV Kart Nationals – Micro	Kali Kart Germany	5th
2017	Graf-Berghe-von-Trips Memorial – Rotax Micro	Kali Kart Germany	1st
2018	Rotax Max Challenge Clubsport – Micro	Nees Racing	2nd
2018	Rotax Max Challenge Germany – Micro	Nees Racing	1st
2018	Rotax Max Challenge Golden Trophy – Micro	Nees Racing	7th
2018	ACV Kart Nationals – Micro	Nees Racing	1st
2018	Graf-Berghe-von-Trips Memorial – Rotax Micro	Nees Racing	1st
2018	Rotax Max Challenge Grand Finals – Micro	Nees Racing	25th
2019	Rotax Max Challenge Clubsport – Mini	Nees Racing	1st
2019	Graf-Berghe-von-Trips Memorial – Mini	Nees Racing	1st
2019	Rotax Max Challenge Germany – Mini	Nees Racing	4th
2020	ADAC Kart Masters – OK-J	Junior Team75 Bernhard	9th

== Racing record ==
=== Racing career summary ===
Season	Series	Team	Races	Wins	Poles	F/Laps	Podiums	Points	Position
2022	French F4 Championship	FFSA Academy	21	0	0	0	1	24	15th
2023	French F4 Championship	FFSA Academy	21	0	0	0	1	24	14th
2024	ADAC GT Masters	Haupt Racing Team	12	0	1	0	1	73	13th
2025	ADAC GT Masters	Haupt Racing Team	12	0	2	1	3	134	7th
2026	ADAC GT Masters	Haupt Racing Team	8	0	0	0	2	68	12th
2026	Nürburgring Langstrecken-Serie – VT2-RWD	Manheller Racing							
2026	GT World Challenge Europe Endurance Cup	HRT Ford Racing	1	0	0	0	0	0	NC
2026	GT World Challenge Europe Endurance Cup – Silver	HRT Ford Racing	1	0	0	0	0	18	23rd
2026	Intercontinental GT Challenge	HRT Ford Racing	1	0	0	0	0	0	NC

=== Complete French F4 Championship results ===
(key) (Races in bold indicate pole position) (Races in italics indicate fastest lap)

Year	1	2	3	4	5	6	7	8	9	10	11	12	13	14	15	16	17	18	19	20	21	Pos	Points
2022	NOG; 1; 13	NOG; 2; 15	NOG; 3; 21	PAU; 1; 8	PAU; 2; 2	PAU; 3; 20	MAG; 1; 14	MAG; 2; 9	MAG; 3; 11	SPA; 1; 21†	SPA; 2; 11	SPA; 3; 13	LÉD; 1; 7	LÉD; 2 Ret	LÉD; 3; 10	CRT; 1; 15	CRT; 2; 14	CRT; 3; 13	LEC; 1; 10	LEC; 2 Ret	LEC; 3; 21	15th	24
2023	NOG; 1; 8	NOG; 2; 9	NOG; 3; 17	MAG; 1 Ret	MAG; 2; 12	MAG; 3; 20	PAU; 1; 15	PAU; 2; 9	PAU; 3; 13	SPA; 1; 8	SPA; 2; 11	SPA; 3; 22	MIS; 1; 20†	MIS; 2; 18	MIS; 3 Ret	LÉD; 1; 3	LÉD; 2; 8	LÉD; 3 Ret	LEC; 1; 13	LEC; 2 Ret	LEC; 3; 17	14th	24

=== Complete ADAC GT Masters results ===
(key) (Races in bold indicate pole position) (Races in italics indicate fastest lap)

Year	Team	Car	1	2	3	4	5	6	7	8	9	10	11	12	DC	Points
2024	Haupt Racing Team	Mercedes-AMG GT3 Evo	OSC; 1; 3	OSC; 2; 9	ZAN; 1; 8	ZAN; 2 Ret	NÜR; 1; 17†	NÜR; 2; 15	SPA; 1; 14	SPA; 2; 9	**RBR**; **1**; 4^{1}	RBR; 2 Ret	HOC; 1 Ret	HOC; 2; 10	13th	73
2025	Haupt Racing Team	Ford Mustang GT3	LAU; 1; 3	**LAU**; **2** Ret^{1}	ZAN; 1; 6	ZAN; 2; 5	**NÜR**; **1**; 4^{1}	NÜR; 2; 2^{2}	SAL; 1; 13	SAL; 2; 9	RBR; 1; 3	RBR; 2; 5	HOC; 1; 6	HOC; 2; 9	7th	134
2026	Haupt Racing Team	Ford Mustang GT3	RBR; 1; 5	RBR; 2 Ret	ZAN; 1; 12	ZAN; 2; 11	LAU; 1; 3	LAU; 2; 3	NÜR; 1; 14	NÜR; 2; 7	SAL; 1	SAL; 2	HOC; 1	HOC; 2	12th	68

=== Complete GT World Challenge Europe results ===
==== GT World Challenge Europe Endurance Cup ====
(Races in bold indicate pole position) (Races in italics indicate fastest lap)

Year	Team	Car	Class	1	2	3	4	5	6	7	Pos.	Points
2026	HRT Ford Racing	Ford Mustang GT3 Evo	Silver	LEC	MNZ	SPA; 6H; 37	SPA; 12H; 19	SPA; 24H; 18	NÜR	ALG	23rd	18
