= Gerhard Tweraser =

Austrian racing driver (born 1989)

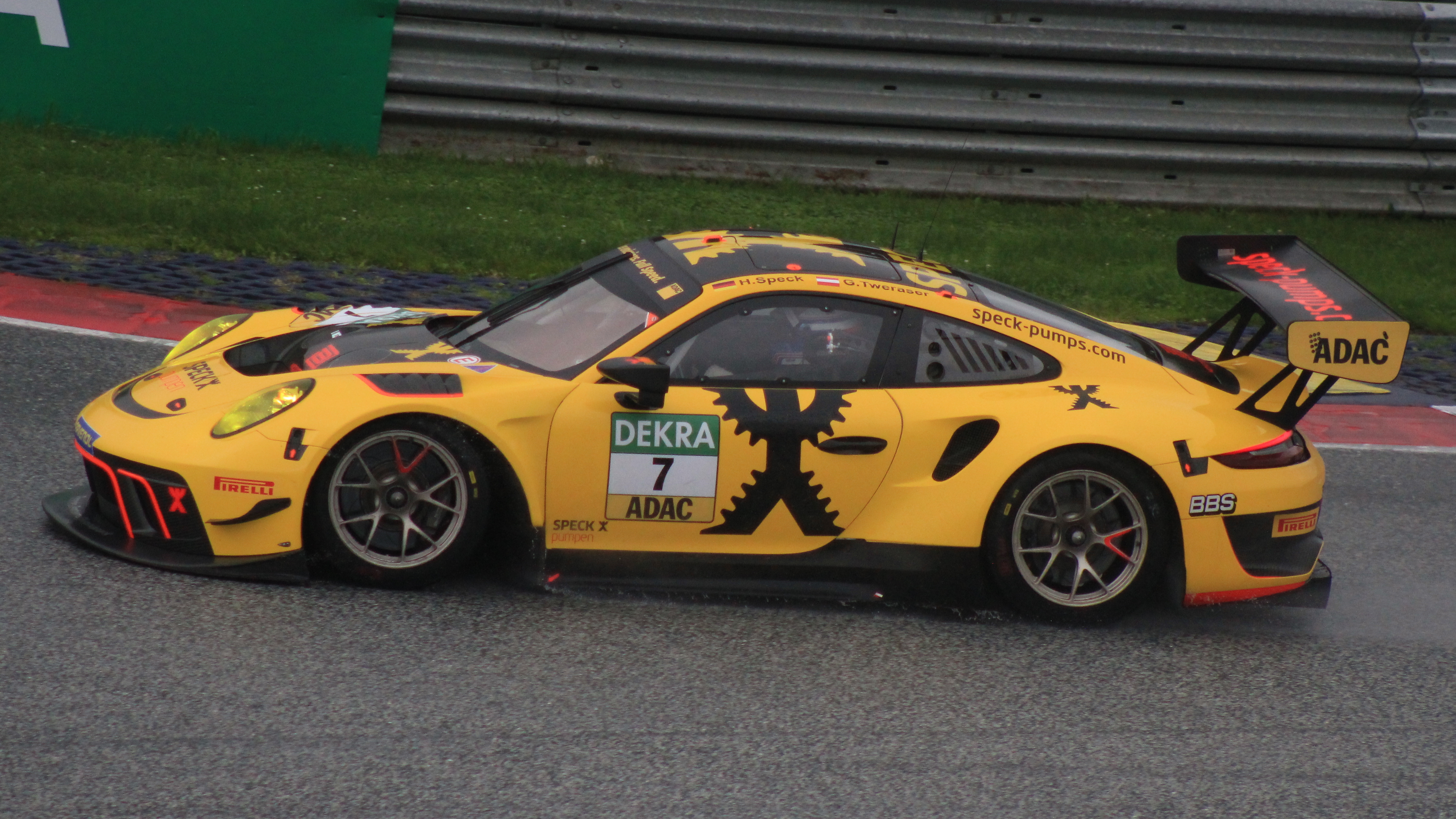
- Tweraser in 2024
- Nationality: (Austria) Austrian
- Born: 29 September 1989 (age 37) Bad Ischl, Austria

ADAC Formel Masters career
- Debut season: 2010
- Current team: Neuhauser Racing
- Categorisation: FIA Silver
- Car number: 3
- Starts: 21
- Wins: 0
- Poles: 0
- Fastest laps: 2
- Best finish: 5th in 2010

Previous series
- 2011 2010 2008 2006: Lamborghini Super Trofeo; ADAC Formel Masters; German Formula Three; Formula Lista Junior

Championship titles
- 2006: Formula Lista Junior

Gerhard Tweraser (born 29 September 1989 in Bad Ischl) is an Austrian racing driver. He has competed in such series as ADAC Formel Masters and the German Formula Three Championship. He won the 2006 Formula Lista Junior championship season.

== Racing record ==
=== Complete German Formula Three Championship results ===
(key) (Races in bold indicate pole position) (Races in italics indicate fastest lap)

Year	Entrant	Chassis	Engine	1	2	3	4	5	6	7	8	9	10	11	12	13	14	15	16	17	18	Pos	Points
2008	Neuhauser Racing	Dallara F305/045	Mercedes HWA	HOC; 1; 11	HOC; 2; 1	OSC; 1; 1	OSC; 2 Ret	NÜR; 1 Ret	NÜR; 2; 5	HOC; 1; 9	HOC; 2; 6	ASS; 1; 11	ASS; 2; 8	NÜR; 1; 8	NÜR; 2; 7	LAU; 1; 5	LAU; 2; 4	SAC; 1; 7	SAC; 2; 7	OSC; 1; 4	OSC; 2; 6	8th	54

=== Complete ADAC Formel Masters results ===
(key) (Races in bold indicate pole position) (Races in italics indicate fastest lap)

Year	Team	1	2	3	4	5	6	7	8	9	10	11	12	13	14	15	16	17	18	19	20	21	DC	Points
2010	Neuhauser Racing	OSC1; 1; 7	OSC1; 2; 3	OSC1; 3; 3	SAC; 1 Ret	SAC; 2; 12	SAC; 3; 4	HOC; 1 Ret	HOC; 2; 6	HOC; 3; 5	**ASS**; **1**; 6	ASS; 2; 6	ASS; 3; 4	LAU; 1 Ret	LAU; 2; 4	LAU; 3; 2	NÜR; 1; 7	NÜR; 2; 6	NÜR; 3; 5	OSC2; 1; 3	OSC2; 2; 3	OSC2; 3; 5	5th	149

=== Complete FIA GT3 European Championship results ===
(key) (Races in bold indicate pole position) (Races in italics indicate fastest lap)

Year	Team	Car	1	2	3	4	5	6	7	8	9	10	11	12	Pos.	Points
2012	Rhino's Leipert Motorsport	Lamborghini Gallardo LP600+	NOG; 1 DSQ	NOG; 2; 8	ZOL; 1	ZOL; 2	NAV; 1	NAV; 2	ALG; 1	ALG; 2	MSC; 1	MSC; 2	NUR; 1	NUR; 2	20th	4

=== Complete ADAC GT Masters results ===
(key) (Races in bold indicate pole position) (Races in italics indicate fastest lap)

Year	Team	Car	1	2	3	4	5	6	7	8	9	10	11	12	13	14	15	16	Pos.	Points
2012	rhino's Leipert Motorsport	Lamborghini Gallardo LP600+	OSC; 1; 32	OSC; 2; 28	ZAN; 1; 31	ZAN; 2; 26	SAC; 1	SAC; 2	NÜR; 1	NÜR; 2	RBR; 1	RBR; 2	LAU; 1	LAU; 2	NÜR; 1	NÜR; 2	HOC; 1; 25	HOC; 2; 24	NC	0
2013	Callaway Competition	Corvette Z06.R GT3	OSC; 1	OSC; 2	SPA; 1	SPA; 2	SAC; 1; 19	SAC; 2 Ret	NÜR; 1	NÜR; 2									NC	0
2013	GRT Grasser Racing Team	Lamborghini Gallardo FL2 GT3									RBR; 1; 22†	RBR; 2 Ret	LAU; 1	LAU; 2	SVK; 1	SVK; 2	HOC; 1	HOC; 2	NC	0
2014	GRT Grasser Racing Team	Lamborghini Gallardo FL2 GT3	OSC; 1	OSC; 2	ZAN; 1	ZAN; 2	LAU; 1	LAU; 2	RBR; 1; 4	RBR; 2 Ret	SLO; 1; 12	SLO; 2; 12	NÜR; 1	NÜR; 2	SAC; 1	SAC; 2	HOC; 1	HOC; 2	NC‡	0‡
2016	GRT Grasser Racing Team	Lamborghini Huracán GT3	OSC; 1; 29	OSC; 2; 13	**SAC**; **1**; 7	SAC; 2; 5	LAU; 1; 16	LAU; 2 Ret	RBR; 1; 10	RBR; 2; 10	NÜR; 1 Ret	NÜR; 2; 25	ZAN; 1	ZAN; 2	HOC; 1	HOC; 2			32nd	18
2024	GRT Grasser Racing Team	Lamborghini Huracán GT3 Evo 2	OSC; 1	OSC; 2	ZAN; 1; 15	ZAN; 2; 11			SPA; 1; 9	SPA; 2; 12			HOC; 1; 13	HOC; 2 Ret					21st	6
2024	HP Racing International	Lamborghini Huracán GT3 Evo 2					NÜR; 1; 16	NÜR; 2; 19											21st	6
2024	DB Motorsport	Porsche 911 GT3 R (991.2)									RBR; 1; 18	RBR; 2; 18							21st	6
2025	ARC Bratislava	Lamborghini Huracán GT3 Evo	LAU; 1	LAU; 2	ZAN; 1	ZAN; 2	NÜR; 1	NÜR; 2	SAL; 1	SAL; 2'	RBR; 1; 14	RBR; 2; 11	HOC; 1	HOC; 2					NC‡	0‡
2026	GRT Grasser Racing Team	Lamborghini Huracán GT3 Evo 2	RBR; 1	RBR; 2	ZAN; 1	ZAN; 2	LAU; 1	LAU; 2	NÜR; 1; 9	NÜR; 2; 6	SAL; 1	SAL; 2							NC‡	0‡
2026	Fullinrace Academy	Audi R8 LMS Evo II											HOC; 1; 7	HOC; 2; 8					NC‡	0‡

‡ Guest driver ineligible to score points

=== Complete GT World Challenge Europe results ===
==== GT World Challenge Europe Endurance Cup ====
(key) (Races in bold indicate pole position) (Races in italics indicate fastest lap)

Year	Team	Car	Class	1	2	3	4	5	6	7	Pos.	Points
2013	GRT Grasser Racing Team	Lamborghini Gallardo LP560-4	Pro-Am	MNZ; Ret	SIL; 15	LEC; 15	SPA; 6H	SPA; 12H	SPA; 24H	NÜR	17th	27
2019	GRT Grasser Racing Team	Lamborghini Huracán GT3	Silver	MNZ; 11	SIL; 8	LEC; Ret	SPA; 6H; 42	SPA; 12H; 36	SPA; 24H; 36	CAT; 33	5th	56
2023	GRT Grasser Racing Team	Lamborghini Huracán GT3 Evo 2	Silver	MNZ	LEC	**SPA**; **6H**; 28	**SPA**; **12H**; 62†	**SPA**; **24H**; Ret	NÜR; 47	CAT; 16	9th	37
2025	GRT Grasser Racing Team	Lamborghini Huracán GT3 Evo 2	Silver	LEC	MNZ	SPA; 6H	SPA; 12H	SPA; 24H	NÜR	CAT; 47	NC	0
2026	Razoon - more than racing	Porsche 911 GT3 R (992.2)	Bronze	LEC; 40							32nd	8
2026	Tresor Attempto Racing	Audi R8 LMS Evo II	Bronze		MNZ; 29	SPA; 6H	SPA; 12H	SPA; 24H	NÜR; 42	ALG	32nd	8

==== GT World Challenge Europe Sprint Cup ====
(key) (Races in bold indicate pole position) (Races in italics indicate fastest lap)

Year	Team	Car	Class	1	2	3	4	5	6	7	8	9	10	11	12	Pos.	Points
2013	GRT Grasser Racing Team	Lamborghini Gallardo LP560-4	Pro-Am	NOG; QR	NOG; CR	ZOL; QR	ZOL; CR	ZAN; QR	ZAN; QR	SVK; QR	SVK; CR	NAV; QR; 3	NAV; CR; 10	BAK; QR	BAK; CR	16th	20
2022	GSM Novamarine	Lamborghini Huracán GT3 Evo	Silver	BRH; 1; 21	BRH; 2; 24	MAG; 1; 24	MAG; 2; 22	ZAN; 1	ZAN; 2	MIS; 1	MIS; 2	VAL; 1	VAL; 2			16th	5

Sporting positions
Preceded by Rolf Biland	Formula Lista Junior; Champion; 2006	Succeeded by Klaus Bachler
