= 2026 ADAC GT Masters =

German sports car racing season

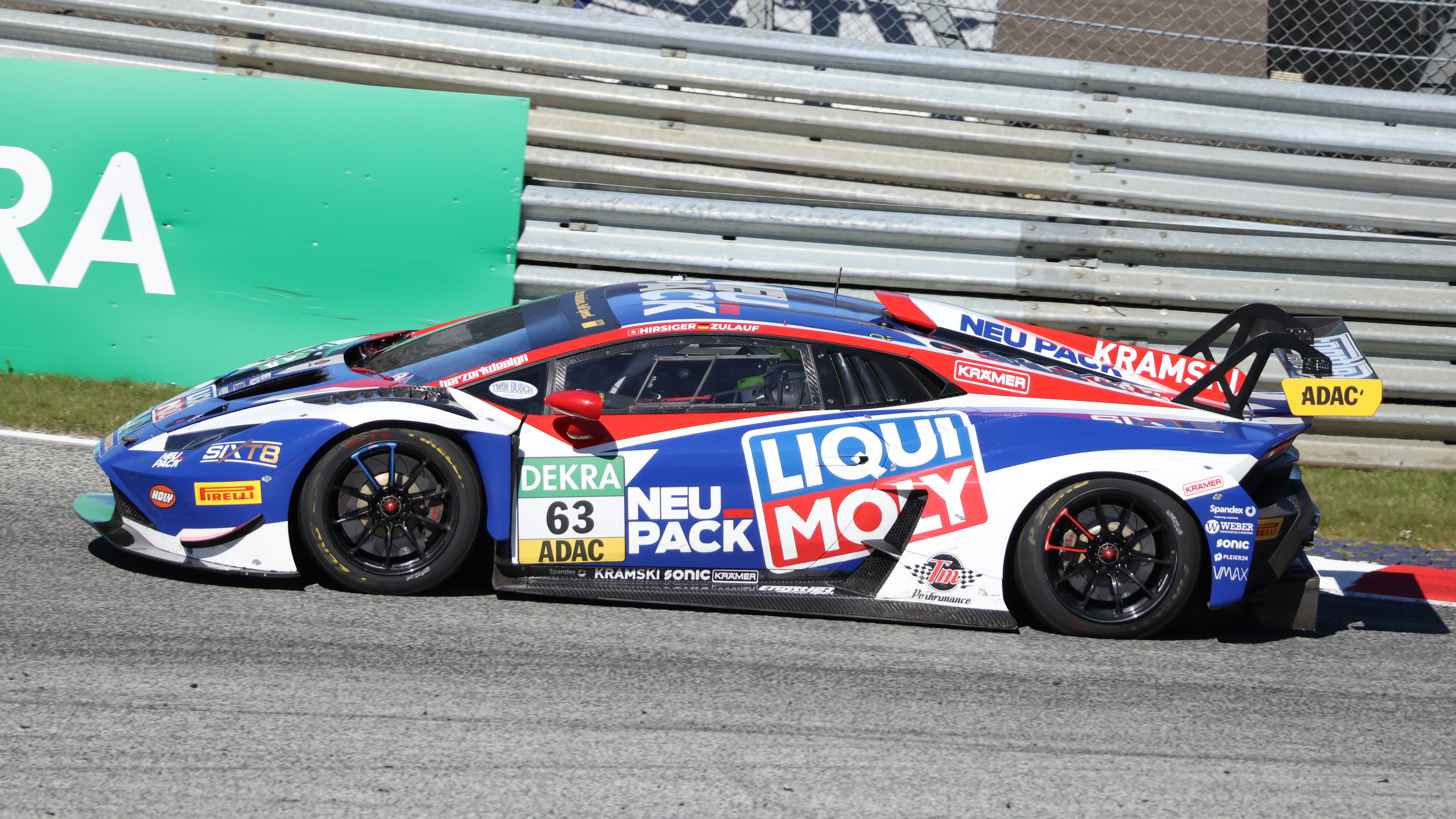
Felix Hirsiger and Finn Zulauf won the Drivers' Championship.

The 2026 ADAC GT Masters was the 20th season of ADAC GT Masters, the grand tourer-style sports car racing series founded by the German automobile club ADAC.

== Race calendar ==
The calendar was announced on 5 October 2025, featuring 12 races at six rounds.

Round	Circuit	Location	Race 1	Race 2	Map of circuit locations	
1	(Austria) Red Bull Ring	Spielberg, Styria	25 April	26 April	2026 ADAC GT Masters is located in Germany 2026 ADAC GT Masters is located in Austria	2026 ADAC GT Masters is located in Netherlands
2	(Netherlands) Circuit Zandvoort	Zandvoort, North Holland	23 May	24 May	2026 ADAC GT Masters is located in Germany 2026 ADAC GT Masters is located in Austria	2026 ADAC GT Masters is located in Netherlands
3	(Germany) Lausitzring	Klettwitz, Brandenburg	20 June	21 June	2026 ADAC GT Masters is located in Germany 2026 ADAC GT Masters is located in Austria	2026 ADAC GT Masters is located in Netherlands
4	(Germany) Nürburgring	Nürburg, Rhineland-Palatinate	11 July	12 July	2026 ADAC GT Masters is located in Germany 2026 ADAC GT Masters is located in Austria	2026 ADAC GT Masters is located in Netherlands
5	(Austria) Salzburgring	Plainfeld, Austria	5 September	6 September	2026 ADAC GT Masters is located in Germany 2026 ADAC GT Masters is located in Austria	2026 ADAC GT Masters is located in Netherlands
6	(Germany) Hockenheimring	Hockenheim, Baden-Württemberg	10 October	11 October	2026 ADAC GT Masters is located in Germany 2026 ADAC GT Masters is located in Austria	2026 ADAC GT Masters is located in Netherlands

== Entry list ==
Team	Car	Engine	No.	Driver	Class	Rounds
(Germany) Haupt Racing Team	Ford Mustang GT3	Ford Coyote 5.4 L V8	1	(Norway) Emil Gjerdrum	S	All
(Germany) Haupt Racing Team	Ford Mustang GT3	Ford Coyote 5.4 L V8	1	(Germany) Max Reis	S	1–4
(Germany) Haupt Racing Team	Ford Mustang GT3	Ford Coyote 5.4 L V8	1	(Poland) Fabian Dybionka	S	5–6
(Germany) Haupt Racing Team	Ford Mustang GT3	Ford Coyote 5.4 L V8	2	(Austria) Kiano Blum	S	All
(Germany) Haupt Racing Team	Ford Mustang GT3	Ford Coyote 5.4 L V8	2	(Germany) Niklas Kalus	S	All
(Germany) Haupt Racing Team	Ford Mustang GT3	Ford Coyote 5.4 L V8	74	(Italy) Max Cuccarese	S	1–2
(Germany) Haupt Racing Team	Ford Mustang GT3	Ford Coyote 5.4 L V8	74	(Switzerland) Alain Valente	S	1–2
(Lithuania) Pure Rxcing	Porsche 911 GT3 R (992)	Porsche M97/80 4.2 L Flat-6	9	(United Kingdom) Alex Malykhin (Note: Malykhin is Belarusian, but he competes under a British licence as Belarusian national emblems were banned by the FIA following the Russian invasion of Ukraine.)	S	2
(Lithuania) Pure Rxcing	Porsche 911 GT3 R (992)	Porsche M97/80 4.2 L Flat-6	9	Alexey Nesov (Note: Nesov is Russian, but he competes as a neutral competitor as Russian national emblems were banned by the FIA following the Russian invasion of Ukraine.)	S	2
(Germany) FK Performance Motorsport	BMW M4 GT3 Evo	BMW P58 3.0 L Turbo I6	10	(Norway) Storm Gjerdrum	S	All
(Germany) FK Performance Motorsport	BMW M4 GT3 Evo	BMW P58 3.0 L Turbo I6	10	(Germany) Fabio Rauer	S	All
(Germany) FK Performance Motorsport	BMW M4 GT3 Evo	BMW P58 3.0 L Turbo I6	11	(South Africa) Leyton Fourie	S	All
(Germany) FK Performance Motorsport	BMW M4 GT3 Evo	BMW P58 3.0 L Turbo I6	11	(Germany) Tim Zimmermann	S	All
(Germany) FK Performance Motorsport	BMW M4 GT3 Evo	BMW P58 3.0 L Turbo I6	12	(South Africa) Joseph Ellerine	S	All
(Germany) FK Performance Motorsport	BMW M4 GT3 Evo	BMW P58 3.0 L Turbo I6	12	(Spain) Jan Durán	S	1–2
(Germany) FK Performance Motorsport	BMW M4 GT3 Evo	BMW P58 3.0 L Turbo I6	12	(Switzerland) Alain Valente	S	3
(Germany) FK Performance Motorsport	BMW M4 GT3 Evo	BMW P58 3.0 L Turbo I6	12	(Denmark) Victor Nielsen	S	4, 6
(Germany) FK Performance Motorsport	BMW M4 GT3 Evo	BMW P58 3.0 L Turbo I6	12	(Germany) Luca Link	S	5
(Austria) razoon – more than racing	Porsche 911 GT3 R (992)	Porsche M97/80 4.2 L Flat-6	14	(Slovenia) Mark Kastelic	S	All
(Austria) razoon – more than racing	Porsche 911 GT3 R (992)	Porsche M97/80 4.2 L Flat-6	14	(Bulgaria) Pavel Lefterov	S	All
(Austria) razoon – more than racing	Porsche 911 GT3 R (992)	Porsche M97/80 4.2 L Flat-6	41	(Austria) Leo Pichler	S	All
(Austria) razoon – more than racing	Porsche 911 GT3 R (992)	Porsche M97/80 4.2 L Flat-6	41	(Germany) Colin Bönighausen	S	1–3, 5–6
(Austria) razoon – more than racing	Porsche 911 GT3 R (992)	Porsche M97/80 4.2 L Flat-6	41	(Germany) Alexander Tauscher	S	4
(Germany) Liqui Moly Team Engstler	Lamborghini Huracán GT3 Evo 2	Lamborghini DGF 5.2 L V10	19	(Singapore) Ethan Brown	S	All
(Germany) Liqui Moly Team Engstler	Lamborghini Huracán GT3 Evo 2	Lamborghini DGF 5.2 L V10	19	(Austria) Tim Hütter	S	All
(Germany) Liqui Moly Team Engstler	Lamborghini Huracán GT3 Evo 2	Lamborghini DGF 5.2 L V10	63	(Switzerland) Felix Hirsiger	S	All
(Germany) Liqui Moly Team Engstler	Lamborghini Huracán GT3 Evo 2	Lamborghini DGF 5.2 L V10	63	(Germany) Finn Zulauf	S	All
(Germany) Liqui Moly Team Engstler	Lamborghini Huracán GT3 Evo 2	Lamborghini DGF 5.2 L V10	163	(Lithuania) Jonas Karklys	S	All
(Germany) Liqui Moly Team Engstler	Lamborghini Huracán GT3 Evo 2	Lamborghini DGF 5.2 L V10	163	(United States) John Paul Southern Jr.	S	All
(Germany) SR Motorsport by Schnitzelalm	Mercedes-AMG GT3 Evo	Mercedes-AMG M159 6.2 L V8	21	(Germany) Enrico Förderer	S	4
(Germany) SR Motorsport by Schnitzelalm	Mercedes-AMG GT3 Evo	Mercedes-AMG M159 6.2 L V8	21	(Germany) Jay Mo Härtling	S	4
(Austria) GRT Grasser Racing Team	Lamborghini Huracán GT3 Evo 2	Lamborghini DGF 5.2 L V10	22	(Austria) Gottfried Grasser	PA	4
(Austria) GRT Grasser Racing Team	Lamborghini Huracán GT3 Evo 2	Lamborghini DGF 5.2 L V10	22	(Austria) Gerhard Tweraser	PA	4
(Germany) PROsport Racing	Mercedes-AMG GT3 Evo	Mercedes-AMG M159 6.2 L V8	26	(Germany) Nico Hantke	S	4
(Germany) PROsport Racing	Mercedes-AMG GT3 Evo	Mercedes-AMG M159 6.2 L V8	26	(Italy) Felice Jelmini	S	4
(Belgium) Comtoyou Racing	Aston Martin Vantage AMR GT3 Evo	Aston Martin AMR16A 4.0 L Turbo V8	39	(United Kingdom) Jamie Day	S	All
(Belgium) Comtoyou Racing	Aston Martin Vantage AMR GT3 Evo	Aston Martin AMR16A 4.0 L Turbo V8	39	(France) Baudouin Detout	S	All
(Czech Republic) Fullinrace Academy	Audi R8 LMS Evo II	Audi DAR 5.2 L V10	44	(Czech Republic) Petr Fulín	PA	6
(Czech Republic) Fullinrace Academy	Audi R8 LMS Evo II	Audi DAR 5.2 L V10	44	(Austria) Gerhard Tweraser	PA	6
(Germany) Schubert Motorsport	BMW M4 GT3 Evo	BMW P58 3.0 L Turbo I6	56	(Germany) Juliano Holzem	S	All
(Germany) Schubert Motorsport	BMW M4 GT3 Evo	BMW P58 3.0 L Turbo I6	56	(Germany) Sandro Holzem	S	All
(Austria) Baron Motorsport	Ferrari 296 GT3	Ferrari F163CE 3.0 L Turbo V6	69	(Zimbabwe) Axcil Jefferies	PA	1
(Austria) Baron Motorsport	Ferrari 296 GT3	Ferrari F163CE 3.0 L Turbo V6	69	(Austria) Ernst Kirchmayr	PA	1
(Germany) HGL Racing	Audi R8 LMS Evo II	Audi DAR 5.2 L V10	77	(Germany) Simon Connor Primm	S	All
(Germany) HGL Racing	Audi R8 LMS Evo II	Audi DAR 5.2 L V10	77	(Poland) Robin Rogalski	S	All

Icon	Class
S	Silver Cup
PA	Pro-Am Cup
	Guest Starter

== Race results ==
Bold indicates overall winner. In the Pole Position column, bold indicates the driver who set the qualifying lap.

Round		Circuit	Pole position	Silver winner	Pro-Am winner
1	R1	(Austria) Red Bull Ring	(Germany) No. 63 Liqui Moly Team Engstler	**(Germany) No. 63 Liqui Moly Team Engstler**	(Austria) No. 69 Baron Motorsport
1	R1	(Austria) Red Bull Ring	(Switzerland) Felix Hirsiger **(Germany) Finn Zulauf**	**(Switzerland) Felix Hirsiger** **(Germany) Finn Zulauf**	(Zimbabwe) Axcil Jefferies (Austria) Ernst Kirchmayr
1	R2	(Austria) Red Bull Ring	(Austria) No. 14 razoon – more than racing	**(Austria) No. 41 razoon – more than racing**	(Austria) No. 69 Baron Motorsport
1	R2	(Austria) Red Bull Ring	**(Slovenia) Mark Kastelic** (Bulgaria) Pavel Lefterov	**(Germany) Colin Bönighausen** **(Austria) Leo Pichler**	(Zimbabwe) Axcil Jefferies (Austria) Ernst Kirchmayr
2	R1	(Netherlands) Circuit Zandvoort	(Germany) No. 56 Schubert Motorsport	**(Germany) No. 11 FK Performance Motorsport**	No Entries
2	R1	(Netherlands) Circuit Zandvoort	(Germany) Juliano Holzem **(Germany) Sandro Holzem**	**(South Africa) Leyton Fourie** **(Germany) Tim Zimmermann**	No Entries
2	R2	(Netherlands) Circuit Zandvoort	(Germany) No. 2 Haupt Racing Team	**(Germany) No. 63 Liqui Moly Team Engstler**	No Entries
2	R2	(Netherlands) Circuit Zandvoort	**(Austria) Kiano Blum** (Germany) Niklas Kalus	**(Switzerland) Felix Hirsiger** **(Germany) Finn Zulauf**	No Entries
3	R1	(Germany) Lausitzring	(Germany) No. 2 Haupt Racing Team	**(Germany) No. 56 Schubert Motorsport**	No Entries
3	R1	(Germany) Lausitzring	**(Austria) Kiano Blum** (Germany) Niklas Kalus	**(Germany) Juliano Holzem** **(Germany) Sandro Holzem**	No Entries
3	R2	(Germany) Lausitzring	(Germany) No. 77 HGL Racing	**(Germany) No. 11 FK Performance Motorsport**	No Entries
3	R2	(Germany) Lausitzring	**(Germany) Simon Connor Primm** (Poland) Robin Rogalski	**(South Africa) Leyton Fourie** **(Germany) Tim Zimmermann**	No Entries
4	R1	(Germany) Nürburgring	(Germany) No. 63 Liqui Moly Team Engstler	**(Germany) No. 63 Liqui Moly Team Engstler**	(Austria) No. 22 GRT Grasser Racing Team
4	R1	(Germany) Nürburgring	**(Switzerland) Felix Hirsiger** (Germany) Finn Zulauf	**(Switzerland) Felix Hirsiger** **(Germany) Finn Zulauf**	(Austria) Gottfried Grasser (Austria) Gerhard Tweraser
4	R2	(Germany) Nürburgring	(Belgium) No. 39 Comtoyou Racing	**(Belgium) No. 39 Comtoyou Racing**	(Austria) No. 22 GRT Grasser Racing Team
4	R2	(Germany) Nürburgring	**(United Kingdom) Jamie Day** (France) Baudouin Detout	**(United Kingdom) Jamie Day** **(France) Baudouin Detout**	(Austria) Gottfried Grasser (Austria) Gerhard Tweraser
5	R1	(Austria) Salzburgring	(Germany) No. 63 Liqui Moly Team Engstler	**(Germany) No. 11 FK Performance Motorsport**	No Entries
5	R1	(Austria) Salzburgring	(Switzerland) Felix Hirsiger **(Germany) Finn Zulauf**	**(South Africa) Leyton Fourie** **(Germany) Tim Zimmermann**	No Entries
5	R2	(Austria) Salzburgring	(Germany) No. 2 Haupt Racing Team	**(Germany) No. 63 Liqui Moly Team Engstler**	No Entries
5	R2	(Austria) Salzburgring	**(Austria) Kiano Blum** (Germany) Niklas Kalus	**(Switzerland) Felix Hirsiger** **(Germany) Finn Zulauf**	No Entries
6	R1	(Germany) Hockenheimring	(Austria) No. 41 razoon – more than racing	**(Germany) No. 2 Haupt Racing Team**	(Czech Republic) No. 44 Fullinrace Academy
6	R1	(Germany) Hockenheimring	(Germany) Colin Bönighausen **(Austria) Leo Pichler**	**(Austria) Kiano Blum** **(Germany) Niklas Kalus**	(Czech Republic) Petr Fulín (Austria) Gerhard Tweraser
6	R2	(Germany) Hockenheimring	(Germany) No. 63 Liqui Moly Team Engstler	**(Germany) No. 63 Liqui Moly Team Engstler**	(Czech Republic) No. 44 Fullinrace Academy
6	R2	(Germany) Hockenheimring	(Switzerland) Felix Hirsiger **(Germany) Finn Zulauf**	**(Switzerland) Felix Hirsiger** **(Germany) Finn Zulauf**	(Czech Republic) Petr Fulín (Austria) Gerhard Tweraser

== Championship standings ==
=== Points system ===
Scoring system

Championship points are awarded for the first fifteen positions in each race. Entries are required to complete 75% of the winning car's race distance in order to be classified and earn points. Individual drivers are required to participate for a minimum of 25 minutes in order to earn championship points in any race.

Position	1st	2nd	3rd	4th	5th	6th	7th	8th	9th	10th	11th	12th	13th	14th	15th
Points	25	20	16	13	11	10	9	8	7	6	5	4	3	2	1
Qualifying	3	2	1												

=== Drivers' standings ===
Pos.	Driver	Team	RBR (Austria)		ZAN (Netherlands)		LAU (Germany)		NÜR (Germany)		SAL (Austria)		HOC (Germany)		Points
1	(Switzerland) Felix Hirsiger (Germany) Finn Zulauf	(Germany) Liqui Moly Team Engstler	1^{1}	3^{3}	4	1^{2}	4	5^{3}	1^{1}	9	12^{1}	1	2	1^{1}	227
2	(South Africa) Leyton Fourie (Germany) Tim Zimmermann	(Germany) FK Performance Motorsport	10	4	1^{3}	2^{3}	2^{3}	1^{2}	3^{2}	5	1	4	6	2	214
3	(Austria) Kiano Blum (Germany) Niklas Kalus	(Germany) Haupt Racing Team	2	5	3^{2}	6^{1}	Ret^{1}	11	2^{3}	2^{2}	3	11^{1}	1	Ret^{3}	163
4	(Germany) Juliano Holzem (Germany) Sandro Holzem	(Germany) Schubert Motorsport	11	7	2^{1}	9	1^{2}	9	4	12	5	10	8	9	132
5	(Slovenia) Mark Kastelic (Bulgaria) Pavel Lefterov	(Austria) razoon – more than racing	9	2^{1}	7	4	6	4	10	11	Ret	8	5^{2}	3	129
6	(Austria) Leo Pichler	(Austria) razoon – more than racing	Ret^{3}	1^{2}	5	5	12	7	7	4^{3}	4^{2}	2^{2}	Ret^{1}	Ret	126
7	(Norway) Emil Gjerdrum	(Germany) Haupt Racing Team	5	Ret	12	11	3	3	14	7	2	6^{3}	4	4	125
8	(Norway) Storm Gjerdrum (Germany) Fabio Rauer	(Germany) FK Performance Motorsport	6	6	9	3	5	8	6	8	7	5	9	5	123
9	(Germany) Simon Connor Primm (Poland) Robin Rogalski	(Germany) HGL Racing	4	8	13	Ret	7	2^{1}	8	10	6^{3}	7	3^{3}	6	121
10	(United Kingdom) Jamie Day (France) Baudouin Detout	(Belgium) Comtoyou Racing	8^{2}	10	11	8	9	6	12	1^{1}	10	3	12	12^{2}	116
11	(Germany) Colin Bönighausen	(Austria) razoon – more than racing	Ret^{3}	1^{2}	5	5	12	7			4^{2}	2^{2}	Ret^{1}	Ret	99
12	(Germany) Max Reis	(Germany) Haupt Racing Team	5	Ret	12	11	3	3	14	7					68
13	(South Africa) Joseph Ellerine	(Germany) FK Performance Motorsport	14	11	8	12	8	12	11	13	11	12	11	10	67
14	(Lithuania) Jonas Karklys (United States) John Paul Southern Jr.	(Germany) Liqui Moly Team Engstler	13	13	Ret	7	10	10	13	14	8	9	13	7	66
15	(Poland) Fabian Dybionka	(Germany) Haupt Racing Team									2	6^{3}	4	4	57
16	(Singapore) Ethan Brown (Austria) Tim Hütter	(Germany) Liqui Moly Team Engstler	12	14	14	10	11	Ret	15	16	9	Ret	10	11	48
17	(Switzerland) Alain Valente	(Germany) Haupt Racing Team	3	9	10	Ret									42
17	(Switzerland) Alain Valente	(Germany) FK Performance Motorsport					8	12							42
18	(Italy) Max Cuccarese	(Germany) Haupt Racing Team	3	9	10	Ret									30
19	(Germany) Alexander Tauscher	(Austria) razoon – more than racing							7	4^{3}					27
20	(Denmark) Victor Nielsen	(Germany) FK Performance Motorsport							11	13			11	10	25
21	(Spain) Jan Durán	(Germany) FK Performance Motorsport	14	11	8	12									21
22	(Germany) Luca Link	(Germany) FK Performance Motorsport									11	12			9
Guest drivers ineligible to score points
–	(Germany) Enrico Förderer (Germany) Jay Mo Härtling	(Germany) SR Motorsport by Schnitzelalm							5	3					–
–	(Austria) Gerhard Tweraser	(Austria) GRT Grasser Racing Team							9	6					–
–	(Austria) Gerhard Tweraser	(Czech Republic) Fullinrace Academy											7	8	–
–	(Austria) Gottfried Grasser	(Austria) GRT Grasser Racing Team							9	6					–
–	(Czech Republic) Petr Fulín	(Czech Republic) Fullinrace Academy											7	8	–
–	(Zimbabwe) Axcil Jefferies (Austria) Ernst Kirchmayr	(Austria) Baron Motorsport	7	12											–
–	(United Kingdom) Alex Malykhin; Alexey Nesov	(Lithuania) Pure Rxcing			6	DNS									–
–	(Germany) Nico Hantke (Italy) Felice Jelmini	(Germany) PROsport Racing							16	15					–
Pos.	Driver	Team	RBR (Austria)		ZAN (Netherlands)		LAU (Germany)		NÜR (Germany)		SAL (Austria)		HOC (Germany)		Points

=== Teams' championship ===
Pos.	Team	Points
1	(Germany) FK Performance Motorsport	333
2	(Germany) Liqui Moly Team Engstler	294
3	(Germany) Haupt Racing Team	289
4	(Austria) razoon - more than racing	240
5	(Germany) Schubert Motorsport	128
6	(Germany) HGL Racing	118
7	(Belgium) Comtoyou Racing	116
