= Felix Hirsiger =

Swiss and British racing driver (born 1998)

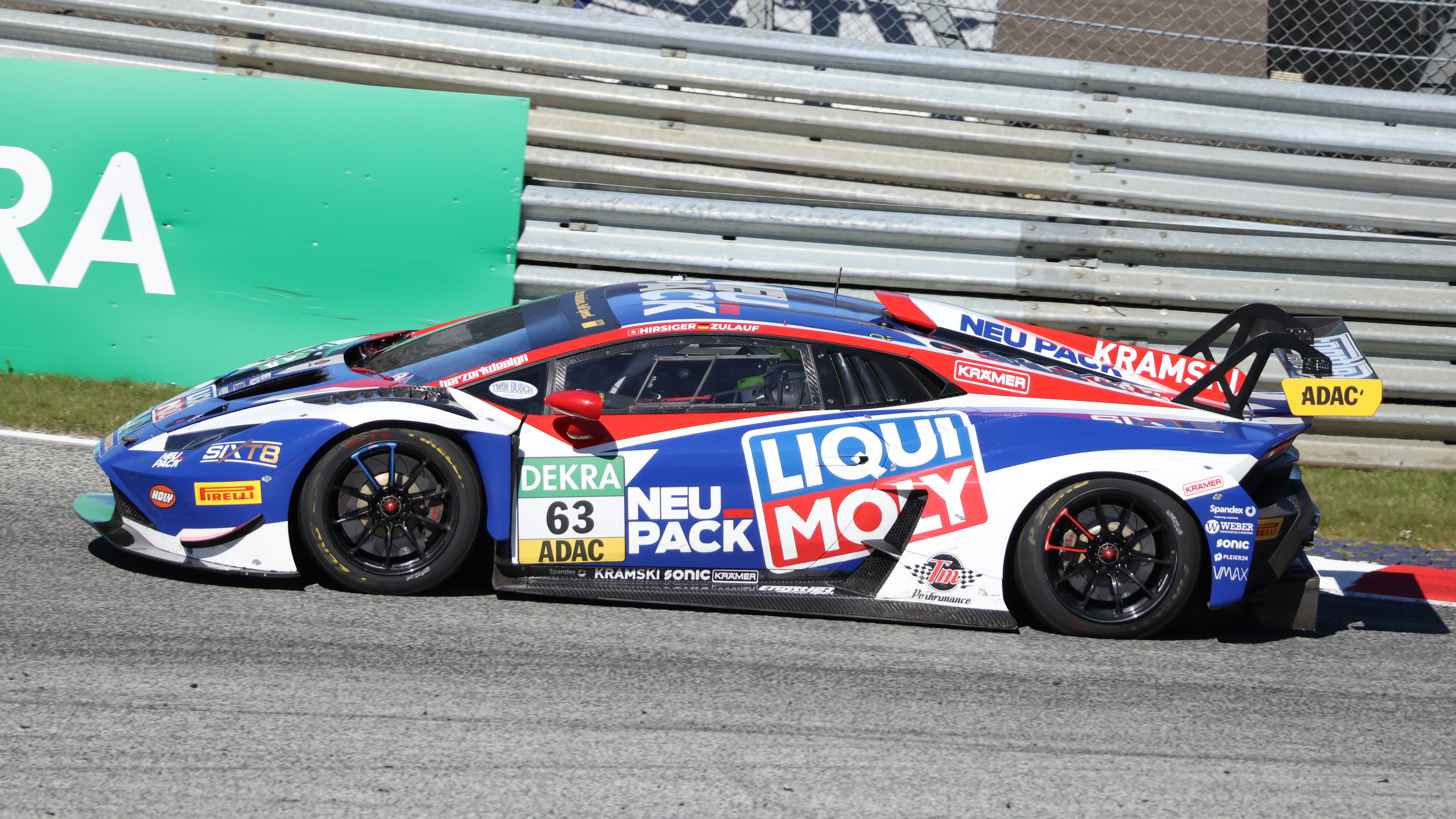
- Hirsiger in his Lamborghini in 2026
- Nationality: (Switzerland) Swiss (United Kingdom) British
- Born: Felix Ernst Hirsiger; 20 May 1998 (age 28) Zug, Switzerland
- Categorisation: FIA Silver

Championship titles
- 2026 2025 2024: ADAC GT Masters; Ferrari Challenge Europe – Trofeo Pirelli; Porsche Sprint Challenge Suisse – Cup 1

Felix Ernst Hirsiger (born 20 May 1998) is a Swiss and British racing driver and retired road racing cyclist. He last competed in ADAC GT Masters for Liqui Moly Team Engstler and the GT World Challenge Europe Sprint Cup for AF Corse.

Hirsiger won the 2026 ADAC GT Masters title with Finn Zulauf

== Career ==
Hirsiger competed in karting from 2008 to 2012, most notably winning the Swiss Rotax Max Challenge Mini title in 2010, as well as the Swiss Karting Championship the following year, in KF3. In 2013, Hirsiger stepped up to single-seaters, joining the FFSA Academy centrally-run French F4 Championship. Starting the season with second-place finishes at Pau and Spa, Hirsiger then took further podiums at Lédenon and Le Castellet en route to a sixth-place points finish.

Remaining in the series for 2014, Hirsiger began the season by taking five podiums in the first seven races, as well as his maiden pole position at Le Mans. At Magny-Cours, Hirsiger took his only series wins, doing so in races one and three from pole, before taking four podiums in the remaining three rounds of the season to secure third in the overall standings. At the end of the year, Hirsiger tested Formula Renault 2.0 machinery for ART Junior Team, and was slated to race for the team in the 2015 Formula Renault 2.0 Northern European Cup, but ultimately only made a one-off appearance in the V de V Challenge Monoplace for RC Formula that year.

Facing budget constraints, Hirsiger switched to cycling in 2016, competing in select road racing events until 2019. The following year, Hirsiger made his return to car racing, competing for Porsche-affiliated Allied Racing in DTM Trophy. Racing in the first four rounds of the season, Hirsiger scored a best result of second in race one at the Lausitzring from pole to end the season 10th in the standings. Despite joining Teichmann Racing to campaign a KTM X-Bow in the Cup X class of the 2021 Nürburgring Langstrecken-Serie, Hirsiger ultimately sat on the sidelines until 2023, when he made one-off appearances in the GT4 European Series and Porsche Carrera Cup Germany for SRS Team Sorg Rennsport.

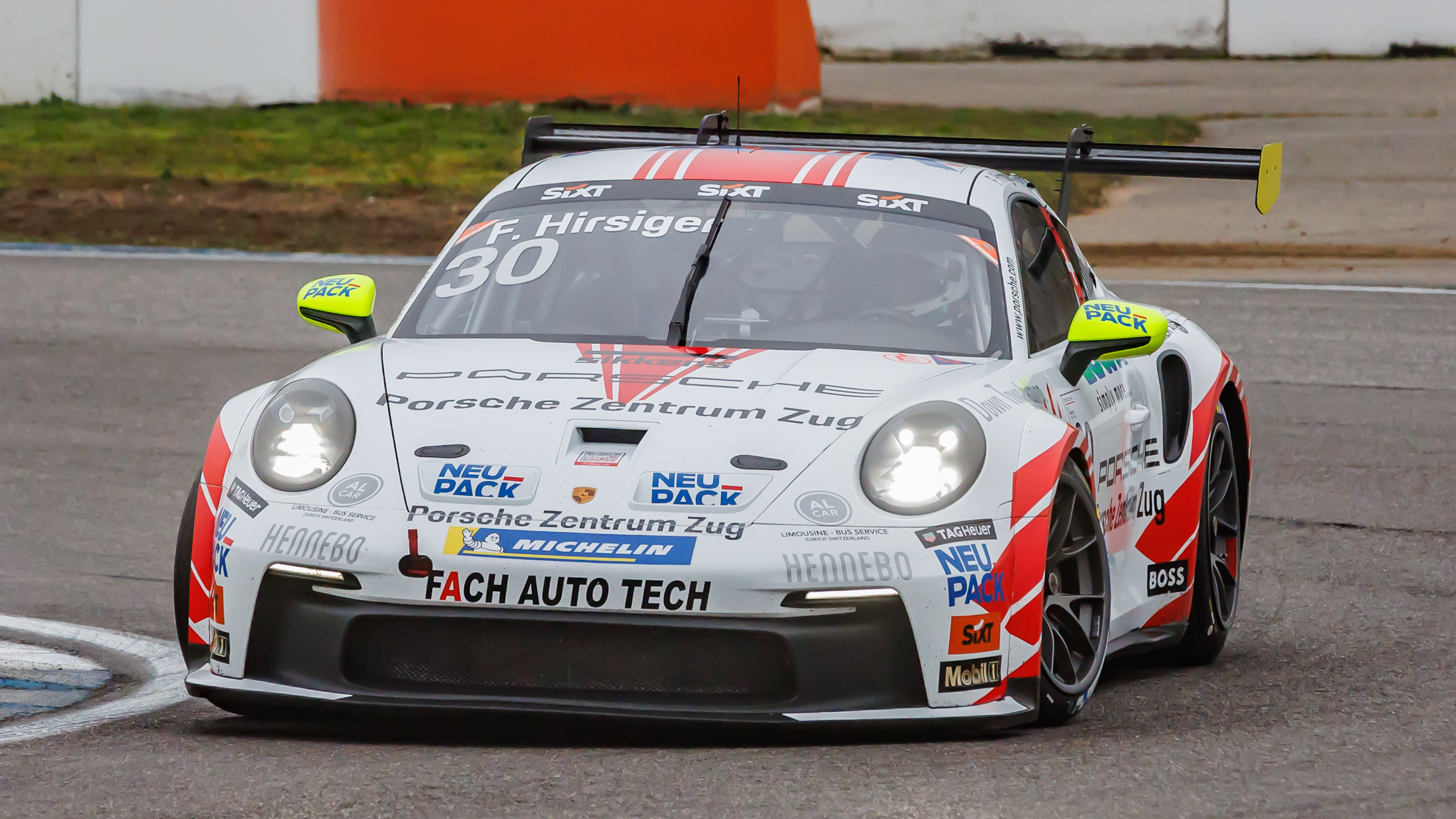
Hirsiger during a guest start in PCCD for Fach Auto Tech at Hockenheim in 2024.

Remaining in Porsche one-make series for 2024, Hirsiger joined Fach Auto Tech to race in Porsche Sprint Challenge Suisse, where he was crowned champion after winning 11 out of 12 races. The following year, Hirsiger switched to Ineco - Reparto Corse RAM to compete in Ferrari Challenge Europe, taking nine wins and two other podiums to secure the Trofeo Pirelli title over Jasin Ferati. During 2025, Hirsiger also made his ADAC GT Masters debut for Lamborghini-affiliated Liqui Moly Team Engstler by GRT.

After competing in select rounds of the following year's GT Winter Series for Liqui Moly Team Engstler between the Cup 1 and GT3 classes, Hirsiger remained with them for the rest of 2026 to compete in ADAC GT Masters alongside Finn Zulauf. In his first full season in the series, Hirsiger won at the Red Bull Ring and Zandvoort, before taking further wins in each of the final three rounds to clinch the ADAC GT Masters title. In parallel, Hirsiger joined AF Corse to compete in the Silver Cup of the GT World Challenge Europe Sprint Cup, sharing a Ferrari 296 GT3 Evo with Carl Bennett, a season in which he scored a lone class pole at Barcelona.

== Karting record ==
=== Karting career summary ===
Season	Series	Team	Position
2008	Swiss Kart Championship — Super Mini		
2009	Swiss Rotax Max Challenge — Mini	Beo Karting	3rd
2010	Swiss Rotax Max Challenge — Mini	Spirit Racing	1st
2011	Schweizer Kart Meisterschaft — KF3		1st
2011	Andrea Margutti Trophy — KF3	Spirit Racing	14th
2011	Karting European Championship — KF3		
2012	Andrea Margutti Trophy — KF3	ART Grand Prix	63rd
2012	Karting European Championship — KF3	ART Grand Prix	74th
2012	Karting Academy Trophy	Peter Hirsiger	28th

== Racing record ==
=== Racing career summary ===
Season	Series	Team	Races	Wins	Poles	F/Laps	Podiums	Points	Position
2013	French F4 Championship	FFSA Academy	19	0	0	1	4	151	6th
2014	French F4 Championship	FFSA Academy	20	2	3	2	11	226	**3rd**
2015	V de V Challenge Monoplace	RC Formula	3	0	0	0	0	0	42nd
2020	DTM Trophy	Allied Racing	8	0	1	0	1	52	10th
2023	GT4 European Series – Silver	SRS Team Sorg Rennsport	2	0	0	0	0	12	30th
2023	Porsche Carrera Cup Germany	SRS Team Sorg Rennsport	2	0	0	0	0	0	NC†
2024	Porsche Sprint Challenge Suisse – Cup 1	Fach Auto Tech	12	11	?	?	11	346	**1st**
2024	Porsche Carrera Cup Germany	Fach Auto Tech	2	0	0	0	0	0	NC†
2025	Ferrari Challenge Europe – Trofeo Pirelli	Ineco - Reparto Corse RAM	16	9	8	10	11	193	**1st**
2025	Ferrari Challenge Finali Mondiali – Trofeo Pirelli	Ineco - Reparto Corse RAM	1	0	0	0	0	—N/a	28th
2025	Italian GT Championship Endurance Cup – GT Cup Div.2 Am	Reparto Corse RAM	1	0	0	0	0	0	NC
2025	ADAC GT Masters	Liqui Moly Team Engstler by GRT	2	0	0	0	0	6	20th
2026	GT Winter Series – Cup 1	Liqui Moly Team Engstler	3	3	0	0	3	44	6th
2026	GT Winter Series – GT3	Liqui Moly Team Engstler	5	1	0	0	3	56	15th
2026	ADAC GT Masters	Liqui Moly Team Engstler	12	5	4	3	7	227	**1st**
2026	GT World Challenge Europe Sprint Cup	AF Corse	10	0	0	0	0	0	NC
2026	GT World Challenge Europe Sprint Cup – Silver	AF Corse	10	0	1	0	0	27.5	9th

^{†} As Hirsiger was a guest driver, he was ineligible to score points.

=== Complete French F4 Championship results ===
(key) (Races in bold indicate pole position) (Races in italics indicate points for the fastest lap of top ten finishers)

Year	1	2	3	4	5	6	7	8	9	10	11	12	13	14	15	16	17	18	19	20	21	Rank	Points
2013	LMS; 1; 5	LMS; 2; 7	LMS; 3; 4	PAU; 1; 7	PAU; 2; 2	PAU; 3; 16	SPA; 1; 2	SPA; 2 DNS	SPA; 3 DNS	VDV; 1 Ret	VDV; 2; 12	VDV; 3; 5	MAG; 1; 13	MAG; 2; 7	MAG; 3; 6	LÉD; 1; 2	LÉD; 2; 7	LÉD; 3; 4	LEC; 1; 4	LEC; 2; 12†	LEC; 3; 3	6th	151
2014	LMS; 1; 6	LMS; 2; 2	**LMS**; **3**; 3	PAU; 1; 3	PAU; 2; 7	PAU; 3; 3	VDV; 1; 2	VDV; 2 Ret	VDV; 3; 19	**MAG**; **1**; 1	MAG; 2; 6	**MAG**; **3**; 1	NOG; 1; 3	NOG; 2; 2	NOG; 3; 3	JER; 1; 12	JER; 2; 9	JER; 3; 13	LEC; 1; 2	LEC; 2 DNS	LEC; 3; 20	3rd	226

=== Complete ADAC GT Masters results ===
(key) (Races in bold indicate pole position) (Races in italics indicate fastest lap)

Year	Team	Car	1	2	3	4	5	6	7	8	9	10	11	12	DC	Points
2025	Liqui Moly Team Engstler by GRT	Lamborghini Huracán GT3 Evo 2	LAU; 1	LAU; 2	ZAN; 1	ZAN; 2	NÜR; 1	NÜR; 2	SAL; 1	SAL; 2	RBR; 1; 16	RBR; 2; 16	HOC; 1	HOC; 2	20th	6
2026	Liqui Moly Team Engstler	Lamborghini Huracán GT3 Evo 2	**RBR**; **1**; 1^{1}	RBR; 2; 3^{3}	ZAN; 1; 4	ZAN; 2; 1^{2}	LAU; 1; 4	LAU; 2; 5^{3}	**NÜR**; **1**; 1^{1}	NÜR; 2; 9	**SAL**; **1**; 12^{1}	SAL; 2; 1	HOC; 1; 2	**HOC**; **2**; 1^{1}	1st	227

=== Complete GT World Challenge Europe results ===
==== GT World Challenge Europe Sprint Cup ====
(key) (Races in bold indicate pole position) (Races in italics indicate fastest lap)

Year	Team	Car	Class	1	2	3	4	5	6	7	8	9	10	Pos.	Points
2026	AF Corse	Ferrari 296 GT3 Evo	Silver	BRH; 1; 26	BRH; 2; 22	MIS; 1; 32	MIS; 2; 23	MAG; 1; 32	MAG; 2; 30	ZAN; 1 Ret	ZAN; 2; 28	**CAT**; **1**; 28	CAT; 2; 26	9th	27.5
