= Mark Kastelic (racing driver) =

Slovenian racing driver (born 2007)

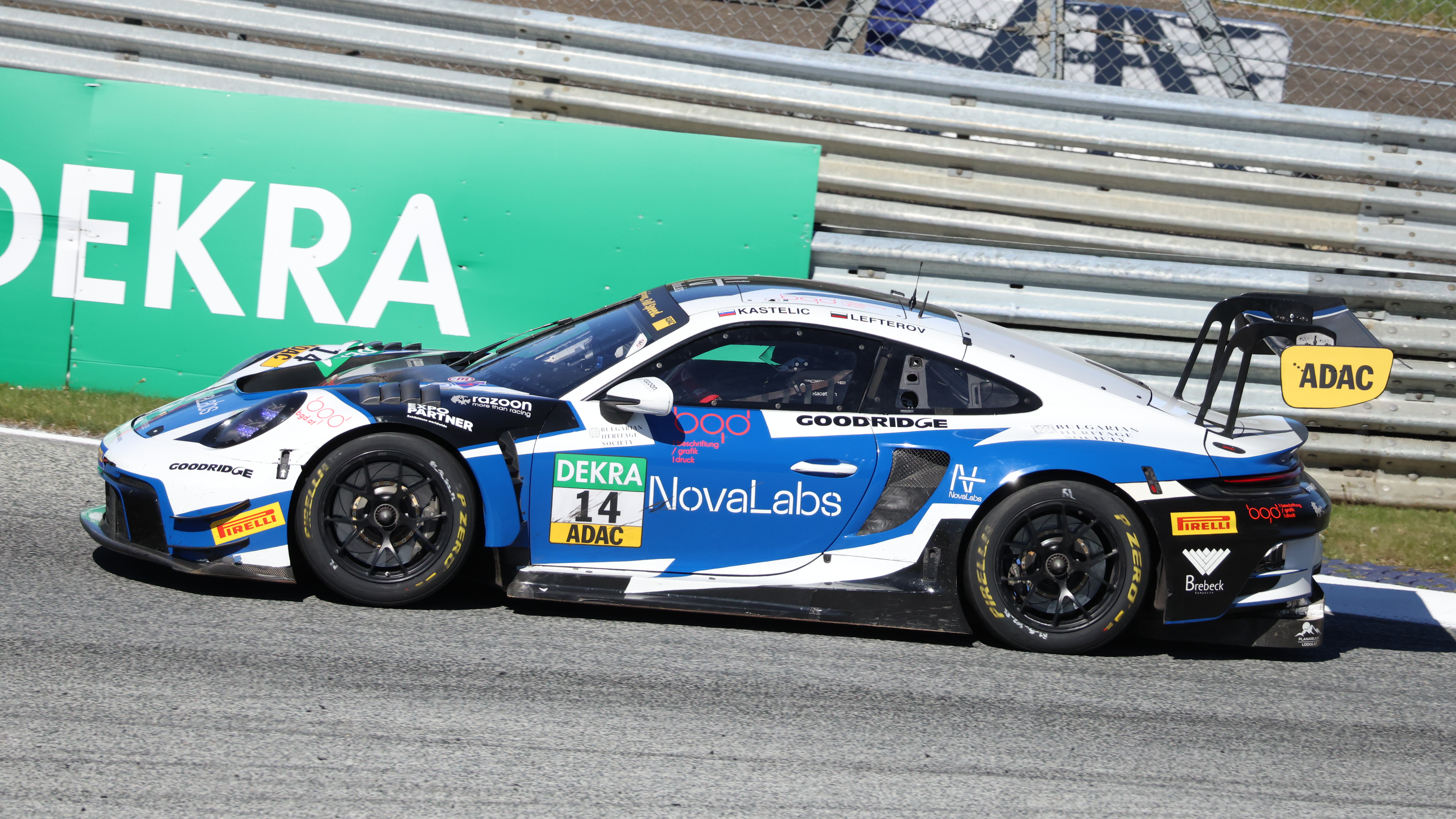
- Kastelic in 2026
- Born: Mark Kastelic; 9 August 2007 (age 19); Ivančna Gorica, Slovenia
- Nationality: (Slovenia) Slovenian
- Categorisation: FIA Silver

Mark Kastelic (born 9 August 2007) is a Slovenian racing driver who last competed in ADAC GT Masters for Razoon - more than racing.

== Career ==
Kastelic began karting at the age of five, and made his debut in international races at the end of 2018. Remaining in WSK-organized championships for 2019, Kastelic won the Trofeo D'Autunno in the X30 Mini class with Team Driver Racing Kart. The following year, Kastelic remained with the team in Mini karts finished runner-up in the Trofeo D'Autunno and third in the Champions of the Future Euro Series. Kastelic then raced for DPK in early 2021, before switching to Forza Racing as he stepped up to Senior Karts during the year, with whom he remained until 2023. In his three-year tenure with Forza Racing, Kastelic most notably finished 10th in the South Garda Winter Cup in the OK class in 2021. During the same year, Kastelic represented Slovenia in the Karting Academy Trophy.

Stepping up to cars in 2024, Kastelic competed for Lema Racing in the ESET Cup Series – GT4 class and XGT4 Italy series. In the former, Kastelic won both sprint races at the Red Bull Ring and the sole endurance race at the same venue to finish third in both standings. In the latter, Kastelic took a lone win at the season-ending round at Misano en route to a third-place points finish. During 2024, Kastelic also debuted in the GT4 European Series and Iberian Supercars championships for the same team. At the end of 2024, Kastelic was named as Talent of the Year by the Slovenian Motorsport Association - AŠSLO.

Kastelic remained with Lema Racing the following year to compete in both the GT4 European Series, XGT4 Italy and Iberian Supercars series. In the European Series, Kastelic finished no higher than 15th across the first three rounds, before taking his maiden points of the season at Misano by finishing fifth in race two. In the following round at the Nürburgring, Kastelic finished 11th among the Silver Cup entrants in race one and retired due to a front-left puncture in race two, before ending the year with another points-scoring finish at Barcelona en route to a 17th-place points finish in the Silver Cup. In the Italian series, Kastelic won the season-opening round at Imola, before winning both races at Monza and Vallelunga, and won the season-ending race at Misano to secure runner-up honors. Racing in the GT4 Pro-Bronze class of the Iberian Supercars, Kastelic won race two at Algarve to kick off the season, before finishing third in both races in the following round at Valencia and scoring a further win at Jerez to end the season fourth in the class standings. During 2025, Kastelic was also once again named as Talent of the Year by the Slovenian Motorsport Association - AŠSLO. At the end of the year, Kastelic tested GT3 machinery for Boutsen VDS at Barcelona.

In 2026, Kastelic stepped up to full-time GT3 competition as he joined Razoon - more than racing to compete in ADAC GT Masters. In his rookie year in GT3 competition, Kastelic took his first podium on his debut round at the Red Bull Ring from pole position, before taking his second podium at the Hockenheimring finale to end the year fifth overall alongside Pavel Lefterov. During 2026, Kastelic also contested the majority of the GT World Challenge Europe Sprint Cup for Porsche-fielding Dinamic GT and finished 10th among the Silver entrants in points. During 2026, Kastelic also dabbled between Audi-affiliated Tresor Attempto Racing and Aston Martin-fielding Walkenhorst Motorsport in a part-time schedule in the GT World Challenge Europe Endurance Cup.

== Karting record ==
=== Karting career summary ===
Season	Series	Team	Position
2017	Hungarian International Open – Micro Max	Kastelic Racing	26th
2018	Hungarian International Open – Micro Max	Kastelic Racing	21st
2018	FIA Central European Zone – Rotax Micro		16th
2018	WSK Final Cup – 60 Mini	Formula K Junior Team	34th
2019	WSK Champions Cup – 60 Mini	Formula K Junior Team	NC
2019	South Garda Winter Cup – Mini Rok	Formula K Junior Team	NC
2019	WSK Super Master Series – 60 Mini	Formula K Junior Team	95th
2019	Andrea Margutti Trophy – 60 Mini	Team Driver Racing Kart	12th
2019	WSK Euro Series – 60 Mini	Team Driver Racing Kart	93rd
2019	Trofeo delle Industrie – 60 Mini	Team Driver Racing Kart	15th
2019	WSK Open Cup – 60 Mini	Team Driver Racing Kart	60th
2019	WSK Final Cup – 60 Mini	Team Driver Racing Kart	25th
2019	Rok Cup Superfinal – Mini Rok	Team Driver Racing Kart	11th
2019	Trofeo D'Autunno – X30 Mini		1st
2020	WSK Champions Cup – 60 Mini	Team Driver Racing Kart	9th
2020	WSK Super Master Series – 60 Mini	Team Driver Racing Kart	6th
2020	South Garda Winter Cup – Mini Rok	Team Driver Racing Kart	14th
2020	WSK Euro Series – 60 Mini	Team Driver Racing Kart	4th
2020	Champions of the Future – 60 Mini	Team Driver Racing Kart	3rd
2020	Andrea Margutti Trophy – 60 Mini	Team Driver Racing Kart	15th
2020	WSK Open Cup – 60 Mini	Team Driver Racing Kart	9th
2020	Trofeo D'Autunno – Mini Int. GR3		2nd
2021	WSK Champions Cup – OK-J	DPK Racing	NC
2021	WSK Super Master Series – OK-J	DPK Racing; Forza Racing (Note: Kastelic competed for DPK Racing in rounds 1-3 and for Forza Racing in round 4.)	44th
2021	WSK Euro Series – OK-J	DPK Racing; Forza Racing (Note: Kastelic competed for DPK Racing in round 1 and for Forza Racing in rounds 2-3.)	8th
2021	Champions of the Future – OK-J	Forza Racing	43rd
2021	Champions of the Future – OK	Forza Racing	95th
2021	Karting European Championship – OK-J	Forza Racing	55th
2021	WSK Open Cup – OK	Forza Racing	32nd
2021	Karting World Championship – OK	Forza Racing	NC
2021	South Garda Winter Cup – OK	Forza Racing	10th
2021	WSK Final Cup – OK	Forza Racing	19th
2021	Karting Academy Trophy	Kastelic Robert	20th
2022	WSK Super Master Series – OK	Forza Racing	60th
2022	Champions of the Future Winter Series – OK	Forza Racing	25th
2023	WSK Super Master Series – OK	Forza Racing	39th
2023	Champions of the Future – OK	Forza Racing	72nd
2023	Karting European Championship – OK	Forza Racing	110th
2023	WSK Euro Series – OK	Forza Racing	54th
2023	Karting World Championship – OK	Forza Racing	42nd
2023	WSK Final Cup – OK	KR Motorsport	29th

== Racing record ==
=== Racing career summary ===
Season	Series	Team	Races	Wins	Poles	F/Laps	Podiums	Points	Position
2024	ESET Cup Series – Sprint GT4	Lema Racing	4	2	0	0	3	20	**3rd**
2024	ESET Cup Series – Endurance GT4	Lema Racing	2	1	0	0	2	20	**3rd**
2024	X-GT4 Italy	Lema Racing	8	1			5		**3rd**
2024	GT4 European Series – Pro-Am	Lema Racing	2	0	0	0	0	2	24th
2024	Iberian Supercars – GT4	Lema Racing	2	0	0	0	0	18	NC
2025	GT4 European Series – Silver	Lema Racing x Mapetrol	12	0	0	0	0	11	17th
2025	X-GT4 Italy	LEMA Racing	10	6	1	0	10	205	**2nd**
2025	Iberian Supercars – GT4 Pro-Bronze	LEMA Racing	6	1	0	0	3	119	4th
2025	ADAC GT4 Germany	Razoon - more than racing	2	0	0	0	0	3	28th
2026	ADAC GT Masters	Razoon - more than racing	12	0	1	0	2	129	5th
2026	GT World Challenge Europe Endurance Cup	Tresor Attempto Racing	1	0	0	0	0	0	NC
2026	GT World Challenge Europe Endurance Cup	Walkenhorst Motorsport	1	0	0	0	0	0	NC
2026	GT World Challenge Europe Endurance Cup – Silver	Tresor Attempto Racing	1	0	0	0	0	0	NC
2026	GT World Challenge Europe Endurance Cup – Silver	Walkenhorst Motorsport	1	0	0	0	0	0	NC
2026	GT World Challenge Europe Sprint Cup	Dinamic GT	8	0	0	0	0	0	NC
2026	GT World Challenge Europe Sprint Cup – Silver	Dinamic GT	8	0	0	0	0	18.5	10th

=== Complete GT4 European Series results ===
(key) (Races in bold indicate pole position) (Races in italics indicate fastest lap)

Year	Team	Car	Class	1	2	3	4	5	6	7	8	9	10	11	12	Pos	Points
2024	Lema Racing	Mercedes-AMG GT4	Pro-Am	LEC; 1	LEC; 2	MIS; 1	MIS; 2	SPA; 1	SPA; 2	HOC; 1	HOC; 2	MNZ; 1; 30	MNZ; 2; 40†	JED; 1	JED; 2	24th	2
2025	Lema Racing x Mapetrol	Mercedes-AMG GT4	Silver	LEC; 1; 20	LEC; 2; 19	ZAN; 1; 17	ZAN; 2; 16	SPA; 1; 18	SPA; 2; 15	MIS; 1; 12	MIS; 2; 5	NÜR; 1; 11	NÜR; 2 Ret	CAT; 1; 11	CAT; 2; 13	17th	11

=== Complete ADAC GT Masters results ===
(key) (Races in bold indicate pole position) (Races in italics indicate fastest lap)

Year	Team	Car	1	2	3	4	5	6	7	8	9	10	11	12	DC	Points
2026	razoon – more than racing	Porsche 911 GT3 R (992)	RBR; 1; 9	**RBR**; **2**; 2^{1}	ZAN; 1; 7	ZAN; 2; 4	LAU; 1; 6	LAU; 2; 4	NÜR; 1; 10	NÜR; 2; 11	SAL; 1 Ret	SAL; 2; 8	HOC; 1; 5^{2}	HOC; 2; 3	5th	129

=== Complete GT World Challenge Europe results ===
==== GT World Challenge Europe Endurance Cup ====
(key) (Races in bold indicate pole position) (Races in italics indicate fastest lap)

Year	Team	Car	Class	1	2	3	4	5	6	7	Pos.	Points
2026	Tresor Attempto Racing	Audi R8 LMS Evo II	Silver	LEC	MNZ	SPA; 6H; 67†	SPA; 12H; 67†	SPA; 24H; Ret	NÜR		NC	0
2026	Walkenhorst Motorsport	Aston Martin Vantage AMR GT3 Evo	Silver							ALG; 45	NC	0

==== GT World Challenge Europe Sprint Cup ====
(key) (Races in bold indicate pole position) (Races in italics indicate fastest lap)

Year	Team	Car	Class	1	2	3	4	5	6	7	8	9	10	Pos.	Points
2026	Dinamic GT	Porsche 911 GT3 R (992.2)	Silver	BRH; 1	BRH; 2	MIS; 1; 33	MIS; 2; 29	MAG; 1; 37	MAG; 2; 22	ZAN; 1; 33	ZAN; 2; 32	CAT; 1; 27	CAT; 2; 27	10th	18.5
