= David Jahn (racing driver) =

German racing driver (born 1990)

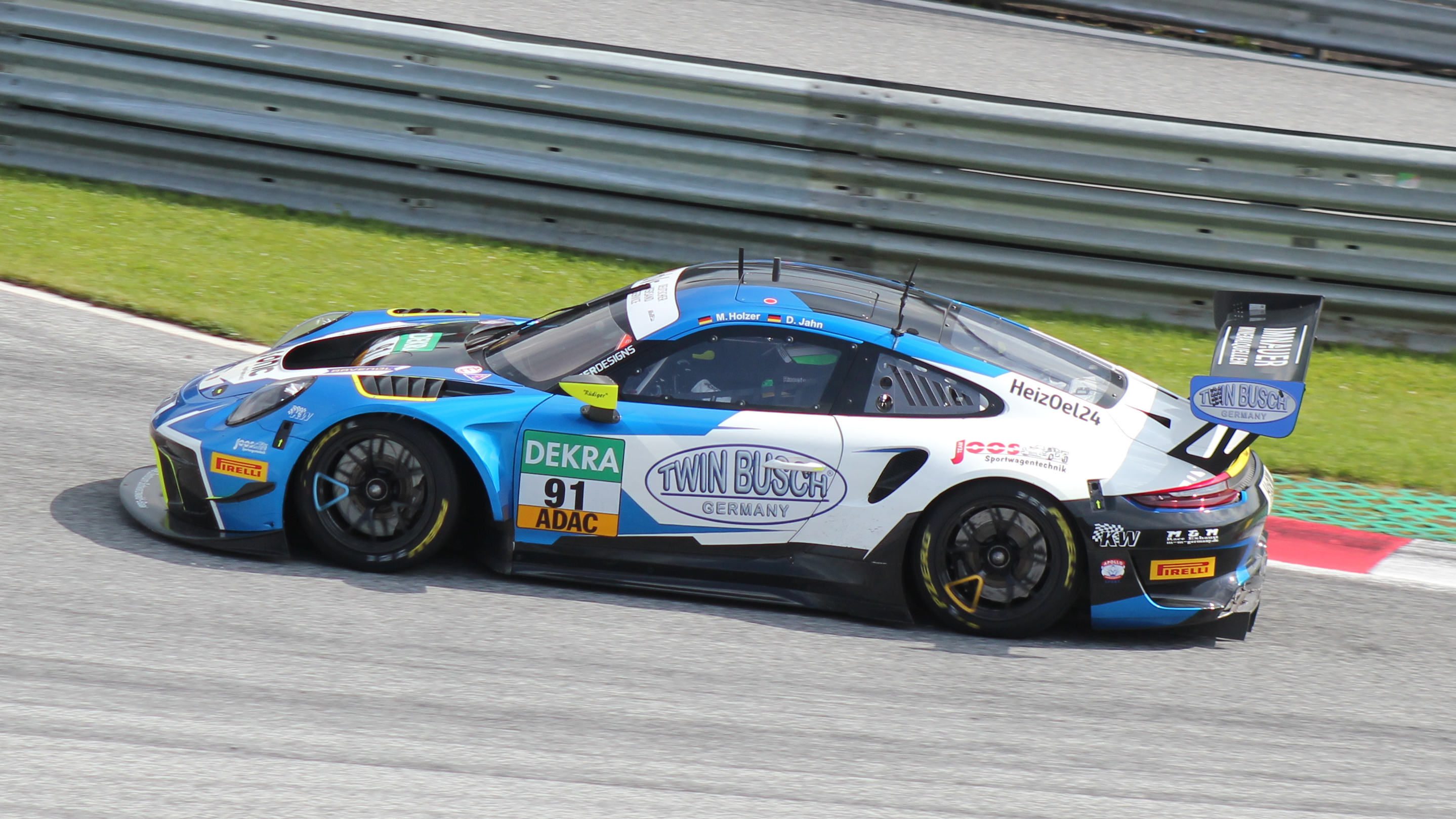
- Jahn in 2021
- Nationality: (Germany) German
- Born: 16 November 1990 (age 35) Speyer, Germany
- Categorisation: FIA Silver

Championship titles
- 2022, 2025: Porsche Endurance Trophy Nürburgring – Cup2 Pro

David Jahn (born 16 November 1990) is a German racing driver who last competed in the Nürburgring Langstrecken-Serie for Gamota Racing. He was ADAC GT Masters runner-up in 2016, and Porsche Endurance Trophy Nürburgring champion in 2022 and 2025.

== Career ==
Jahn made his car racing debut in 2009, racing in the ADAC Volkswagen Polo Cup, in which he won at Barcelona and finished seventh in points. The following year, Jahn raced in the Porsche Super Sports Cup Germany, scoring a win at the Hockenheimring and ending the year fourth in points. Jahn then competed part-time in Porsche Carrera Cup Germany across the next two years, before joining Farnbacher Racing to compete in the last four rounds of the 2013 ADAC GT Masters season.

In 2014, Jahn joined Callaway-affiliated RWT Racing for his maiden full season in ADAC GT Masters alongside Sven Barth. Racing in all but one rounds, the pair scored their first podium at Slovakia Ring by finishing third in race one, before then scoring their only win of the season at the Nürburgring in race one en route to a 17th-place points finish. During 2014, Jahn also drove for RWT in the final round of the GT Sprint Series in Baku.

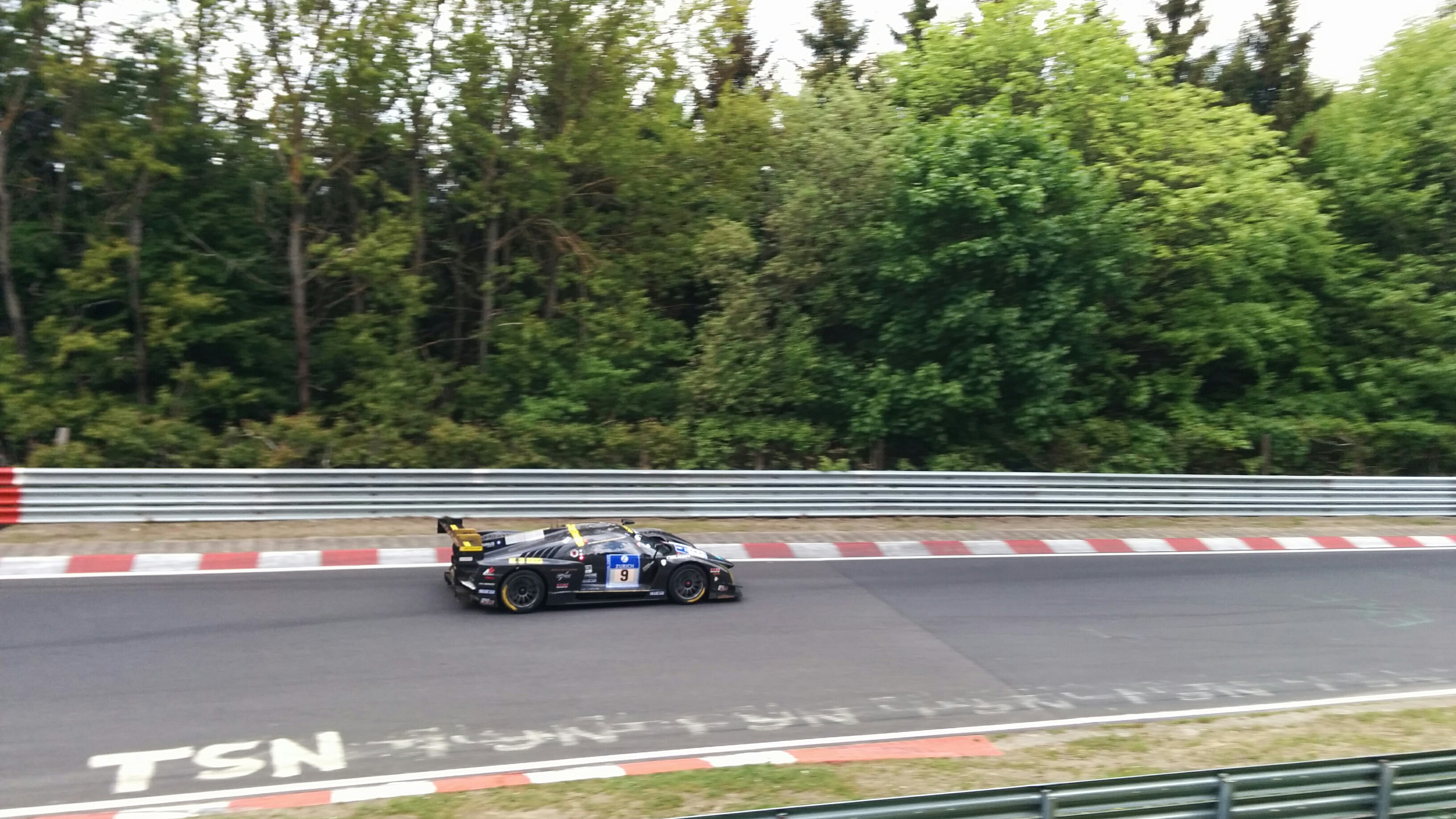
Jahn won the 2015 24 Hours of Nürburgring in SP-X for Scuderia Cameron Glickenhaus.

After only racing at the 24 Hours of Nürburgring in 2015 for Scuderia Cameron Glickenhaus, Jahn joined Porsche-fielding KÜS Team75 Bernhard in 2016 for his sophomore season in ADAC GT Masters. Partnering a number of drivers including Kévin Estre, Jahn scored victory at the Red Bull Ring, then won at the Nürburgring and Zandvoort, and ended the season with another win at Hockenheimring to secure runner-up honours in points. During 2016, Jahn also made a one-off appearance in the Le Castellet round of the European Le Mans Series in the GTE class for Proton Competition.

Having only made one-off appearances in Porsche Carrera Cup cars for two years, Jahn returned to RWT Racing's Corvette for the 2019 ADAC GT Masters season. In his reunion with Sven Barth, Jahn scored podiums at Most and Red Bull Ring as he ended the year seventh in points. Returning to KÜS Team75 Bernhard for the 2020 season, Jahn guided rookie Jannes Fittje to a best result of fourth twice and finished the season 17th in the overall standings. Switching to fellow Porsche customer Team Joos Sportwagentechnik for 2021, Jahn scored a best result of sixth twice en route to a 15th-place points finish at season's end.

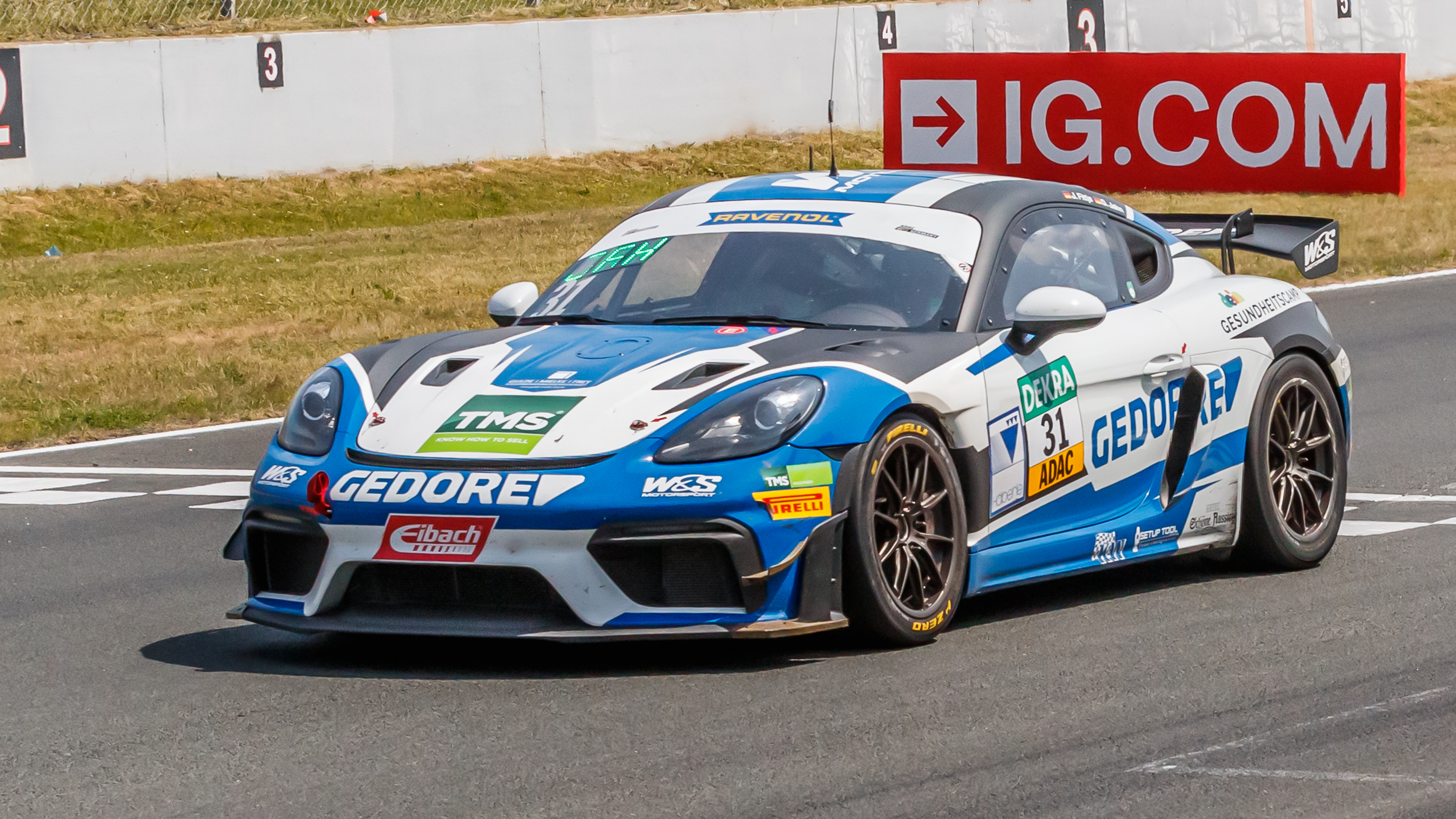
Jahn racing a Porsche at Oschersleben during the 2023 ADAC GT4 Germany.

Jahn then joined W&S Motorsport to race in the new-for-2022 Porsche Endurance Trophy Nürburgring. Competing in the last six races of the season, Jahn took five class wins and helped the team secure the Cup2 title at season's end. Remaining with W&S Motorsport for 2023, Jahn joined Jannes Fittje to compete in ADAC GT4 Germany. In his only season in the series, Jahn won at Zandvoort and Hockenheimring as well as taking three more podiums to end the year third in points. Continuing with W&S Motorsport for 2024, Jahn returned to Porsche Endurance Trophy Nürburgring's Cup2 class full-time, in which he scored two class wins and finished runner-up in points. Staying in the series for 2025 but switching to Mühlner Motorsport, Jahn won all but three races to secure the Cup2 Pro title at the end of the year.

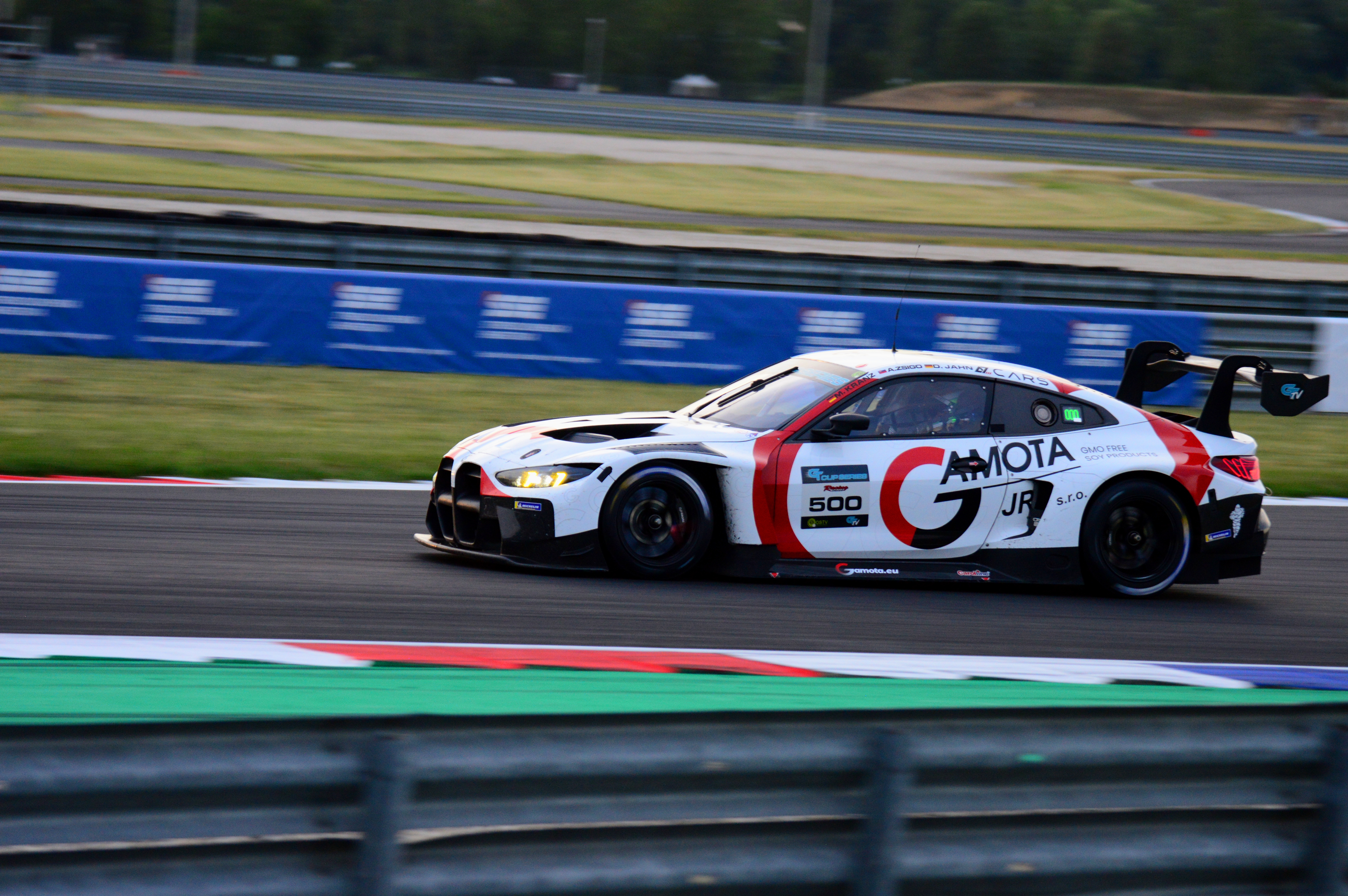
Jahn's Gamota BMW at the Slovakia Ring round of the 2026 GT Cup Series.

In 2026, Jahn returned to GT3 competition as he joined BMW-affiliated Gamota Racing to compete in the SP9 Pro-Am class of the Nürburgring Langstrecken-Serie. At the 24h Nürburgring Qualifiers, Jahn took pole position, clearing the field by two seconds and beating four-time Formula One world champion Max Verstappen. A lone class win at NLS3 and other poles at NLS8 and NLS10 then ensued en route to fourth in the SP9 Pro-Am standings.

== Karting record ==
=== Karting career summary ===
Season	Series	Team	Position
2006	DMV Bundesmeisterschaft – ICA		3rd
2006	Deutsche Kart-Meisterschaft – Senior	Team Zinner	34th
2007	Deutsche Kart-Meisterschaft – KF2	Valier Racing	12th
2008	Deutsche Kart-Meisterschaft – KF2		5th
2008	ADAC Kart Masters – KF2	Speyer	12th
2008	Karting European Championship – KF2	DMV Team KSN	NC
2009	ADAC Kart Masters – KF2	Speyer	2nd
2012	24 Hours of Leipzig	C2 Race Cup by Seyffarth Motorsport	12th

== Racing record ==
=== Racing career summary ===
Season	Series	Team	Races	Wins	Poles	F/Laps	Podiums	Points	Position
2009	ADAC Volkswagen Polo Cup	ADAC e.V. Motorsport	9	1	0	0	1	143	7th
2010	ADAC GT Masters	Seyffarth Motorsport	6	0	0	0	0	0	NC
2010	Porsche Super Sports Cup Germany – 5C	Seyffarth Motorsport						142.4	4th
2011	Porsche Carrera Cup Germany – Class A	Alzen Automotive	4	0	0	0	0	23	15th
2012	Porsche Carrera Cup Germany – Class A	Hermes Attempto Racing	8	0	0	0	0	35	16th
2012	24 Hours of Nürburgring – V6	Black Falcon Team TMD Friction	1	0	1	0	0	—N/a	4th
2013	ADAC GT Masters	Farnbacher Racing	8	0	0	0	0	10	34th
2013	24 Hours of Nürburgring – SP7	Black Falcon Team TMD Friction	1	0	0	0	0	—N/a	4th
2014	ADAC GT Masters	RWT Racing	13	1	0	1	2	54	17th
2014	Blancpain Sprint Series – Silver	Callaway – RWT	2	0	0	0	0	0	NC†
2014	24 Hours of Nürburgring – SP7	Black Falcon Team Reissdorf Alkoholfrei	1	1	0	0	1	—N/a	**1st**
2015	VLN Series – SP9 Pro	Walkenhorst Motorsport	1	0	0	0	0	0	NC
2015	24 Hours of Nürburgring – SP-X	Scuderia Cameron Glickenhaus	1	1	1	1	1	—N/a	**1st**
2016	ADAC GT Masters	KÜS Team75 Bernhard	14	4	2	1	6	159	**2nd**
2016	European Le Mans Series – GTE	Proton Competition	1	0	0	0	0	0	20th
2018	24H GT Series – 991 Pro	race:pro motorsport	1	0	0	0	0	0	NC
2019	ADAC GT Masters	RWT Racing	14	0	0	0	3	110	7th
2020	ADAC GT Masters	KÜS Team75 Bernhard	14	0	0	0	0	58	17th
2021	ADAC GT Masters	Team Joos Sportwagentechnik	14	0	0	0	0	61	15th
2022	Porsche Endurance Trophy Nürburgring – Cup2	AVIA W&S Motorsport	6	5	1	2	5	163‡	**1st‡**
2023	ADAC GT4 Germany	AVIA W&S Motorsport	12	2	2	1	5	148	**3rd**
2023	Porsche Endurance Trophy Nürburgring – Cup2 Pro	AVIA W&S Motorsport	4	0	1	1	1	38‡	25th‡
2023	Porsche Endurance Trophy Nürburgring – Cup2 Pro	Max Kruse Racing	1	0	0	0	0	38‡	25th‡
2024	Porsche Endurance Trophy Nürburgring – Cup2 Pro	AVIA W&S Motorsport	8	2	4	1	6	122.5‡	**2nd‡**
2025	Porsche Endurance Trophy Nürburgring – Cup2 Pro	Mühlner Motorsport	10	7	0	0	9	169‡	**1st‡**
2025	24H Series – 992 Pro	Mühlner Motorsport	1	0	0	0	0	0	NC
2026	Nürburgring Langstrecken-Serie – SP9 Pro-Am	Gamota Racing	8	1	3	0	6	52	4th
2026	24H Series – GT3	Gamota Racing	1	0	0	0	0	24	32nd

^{†} As Jahn was a guest driver, he was ineligible to score points.

^{‡} Team standings

=== Complete ADAC GT Masters results ===
(key) (Races in bold indicate pole position) (Races in italics indicate fastest lap)

Year	Team	Car	1	2	3	4	5	6	7	8	9	10	11	12	13	14	15	16	DC	Points
2010	Seyffarth Motorsport	Porsche 997 GT3 Cup	OSC1; 1; 17	OSC1; 2; 16	SAC; 1; 14	SAC; 2; 13	HOC; 1 Ret	HOC; 2; 13	ASS; 1	ASS; 2	LAU; 1	LAU; 2	NÜR; 1	NÜR; 2	OSC2; 1	OSC2; 2			NC	0
2013	Farnbacher Racing	Porsche 911 GT3 R	OSC; 1	OSC; 2	SPA; 1	SPA; 2	SAC; 1	SAC; 2	NÜR; 1	NÜR; 2	RBR; 1; 20	RBR; 2 Ret	LAU; 1; 12	LAU; 2; 11	SVK; 1; 11	SVK; 2 Ret	HOC; 1; 7	HOC; 2; 8	34th	10
2014	RWT Racing	Corvette Z06.R GT3	OSC; 1; 8	OSC; 2 Ret	ZAN; 1; 17	ZAN; 2; 15	LAU; 1	LAU; 2	RBR; 1; 8	RBR; 2 Ret	SLO; 1; 3	SLO; 2; 19	NÜR; 1; 1	NÜR; 2 DNS	SAC; 1; 8	SAC; 2; 14	HOC; 1; 12	HOC; 2 Ret	17th	54
2016	KÜS Team75 Bernhard	Porsche 911 GT3 R	OSC; 1; 13	OSC; 2; 24	SAC; 1; 8	SAC; 2; 14	LAU; 1; 24	LAU; 2; 4	RBR; 1; 1	RBR; 2; 5	NÜR; 1; 1	**NÜR**; **2**; 3	ZAN; 1; 1	**ZAN**; **2** Ret	HOC; 1; 1	HOC; 2; 2			2nd	159
2019	RWT Racing	Corvette C7 GT3-R	OSC; 1; 8	OSC; 2; 13	MST; 1; 4	MST; 2; 3	RBR; 1; 2	RBR; 2; 8	ZAN; 1; 12	ZAN; 2 Ret	NÜR; 1; 4	NÜR; 2; 22	HOC; 1; 11	HOC; 2; 15	SAC; 1; 7	SAC; 2; 10			7th	110
2020	KÜS Team75 Bernhard	Porsche 911 GT3 R	LAU1; 1; 4	LAU1; 2; 11	NÜR; 1; 14	NÜR; 2; 18	HOC; 1; 12	HOC; 2; 11	SAC; 1; 31†	SAC; 2; 14	RBR; 1; 16	RBR; 2; 12	LAU2; 1; 4	LAU2; 2 Ret	OSC; 1; 14	OSC; 2; 8			17th	58
2021	Team Joos Sportwagentechnik	Porsche 911 GT3 R	OSC; 1; 8	OSC; 2; 10	RBR; 1; 6	RBR; 2; 9	ZAN; 1; 13	ZAN; 2; 20	LAU; 1; 6	LAU; 2; 17	SAC; 1 Ret	SAC; 2 Ret	HOC; 1; 7	HOC; 2; 10	NÜR; 1; 17	NÜR; 2 Ret			15th	61

=== Complete GT World Challenge Europe results ===
==== Complete Blancpain Sprint Series results ====
(key) (Races in bold indicate pole position; results in italics indicate fastest lap)

Year	Team	Car	Class	1	2	3	4	5	6	7	8	9	10	11	12	13	14	Pos.	Points
2014	Callaway – RWT	Corvette Z06.R GT3	Silver	NOG; QR	NOG; CR	BRH; QR	BRH; CR	ZAN; QR	ZAN; CR	SVK; QR	SVK; CR	ALG; QR	ALG; CR	ZOL; QR	ZOL; CR	BAK; QR; 14	BAK; CR; 8	NC†	0†

^{†} As Jahn was a guest driver, he was ineligible to score points.

=== Complete European Le Mans Series results ===
(key) (Races in bold indicate pole position; results in italics indicate fastest lap)

Year	Entrant	Class	Chassis	Engine	1	2	3	4	5	6	Rank	Points
2016	Proton Competition	LMGTE	Porsche 911 RSR	Porsche 4.0 L Flat-6	SIL	IMO	RBR	LEC; Ret	SPA	EST	20th	0

=== Complete ADAC GT4 Germany results ===
(key) (Races in bold indicate pole position) (Races in italics indicate fastest lap)

Year	Team	Car	1	2	3	4	5	6	7	8	9	10	11	12	DC	Points
2023	AVIA W&S Motorsport	Porsche 718 Cayman GT4 Clubsport	OSC; 1; 5	OSC; 2; 6	**ZAN**; **1**; 1	ZAN; 2; 3	NÜR; 1; 17	NÜR; 2; 8	LAU; 1; 13	LAU; 2; 2	**SAC**; **1**; 2	**SAC**; **2** Ret	HOC; 1; 1	HOC; 2; 6	3rd	148
