= Marek Böckmann =

German racing driver (born 1996)

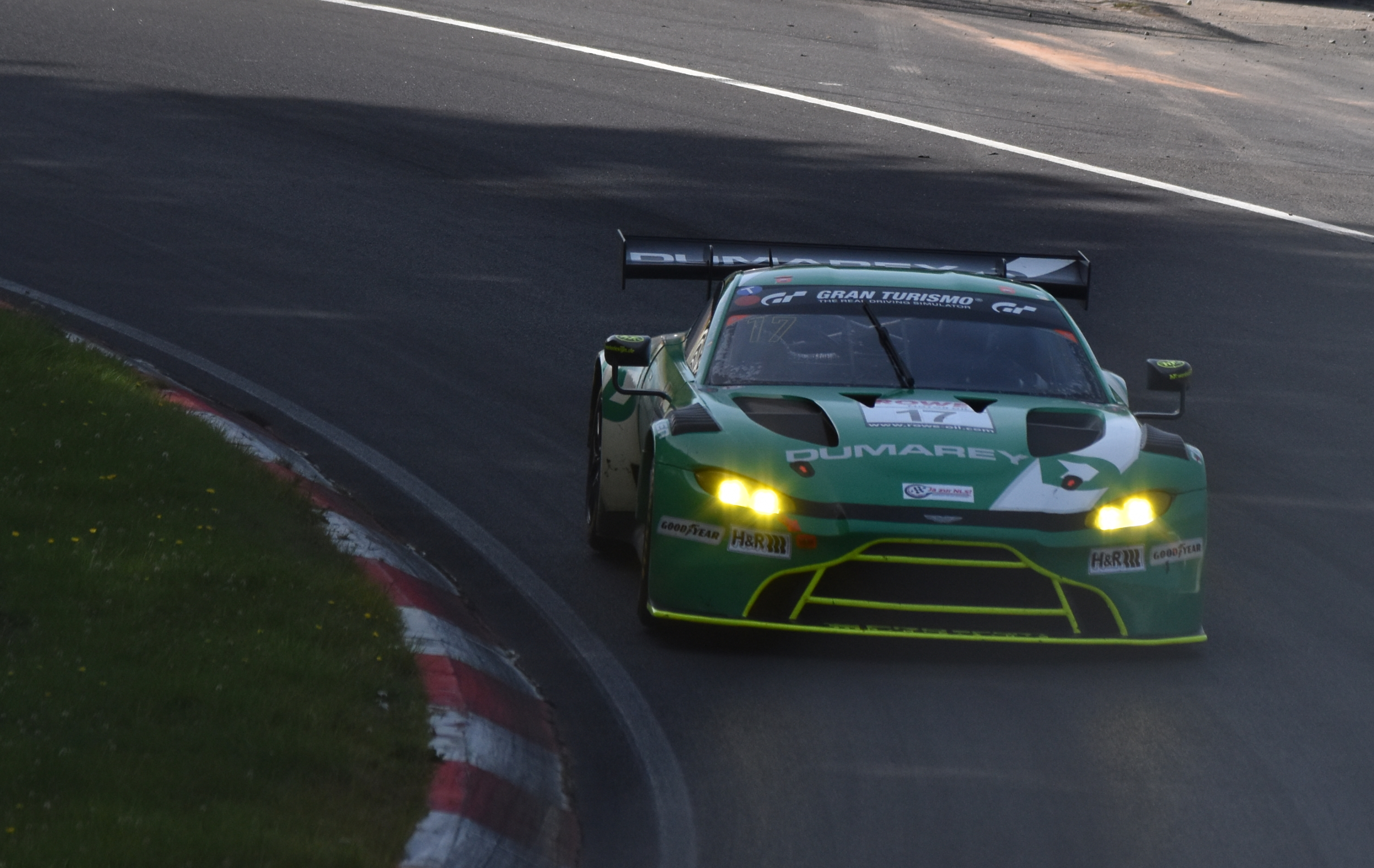
- Böckmann in 2023
- Nationality: (Germany) German
- Born: 16 September 1996 (age 30) Lautersheim, Germany

ADAC GT4 Germany career
- Debut season: 2022
- Current team: PROsport Racing
- Categorisation: FIA Silver
- Car number: 26
- Former teams: Schnitzelalm Racing
- Starts: 29
- Wins: 1
- Podiums: 5
- Poles: 1
- Fastest laps: 1
- Best finish: 12th in 2022

Previous series
- 2017 2016 2015 2014 2013: GT4 European Series Northern Cup; Porsche Carrera Cup Germany; ADAC Formula 4 Championship; Formula Renault 2.0 Alps Series; V de V Challenge Monoplace

Championship titles
- 2020: Nürburgring Langstrecken-Serie – SP-Pro

Marek Böckmann (born 16 September 1996) is a German racing driver who last competed in the Nürburgring Langstrecken-Serie and ADAC GT4 Germany for PROsport Racing.

== Career ==
Böckmann began his single-seater career in 2013, competing in the V de V Challenge Monoplace for Elbracht Motorsport. In 2014, Böckmann joined Jenzer Motorsport to compete in the Formula Renault 2.0 Alps Series, taking a best result of tenth at Spa to end the year 20th in the overall standings. Remaining with Jenzer for 2015, Böckmann moved to the newly-created ADAC Formula 4 Championship, scoring a lone podium at the second Oschersleben round to take 17th in points.

In 2016, Böckmann moved to sportscar racing, joining KÜS Team 75 Bernhard to compete in Porsche Carrera Cup Germany. After finishing ninth in the A Class points, Böckmann entered the VLN Series in 2017, as well as winning the 24 Hours of Nürburgring in the V5 class and making his GT4 European Series Northern Cup debut for PROsport Performance.

Böckmann quickly moved up to SP9, driving a Porsche 911 GT3 R for GetSpeed Performance in the 2018 VLN Series. With GetSpeed switching to a Mercedes-AMG GT3 for 2019, Böckmann scored his maiden overall podium at VLN4, as well as winning the 24 Hours of Nürburgring for Black Falcon in SP10. Böckmann then stuck with Black Falcon for the newly-renamed Nürburgring Langstrecken-Serie in 2020, winning all five races in SP-Pro to clinch the class title as the only entrant, as was also the case at the 24 Hours of Nürburgring. In 2021, Böckmann joined Mercedes-fielding Schnitzelalm Racing in the SP10 class, taking six wins to secure runner-up honours in points, as well as taking his third consecutive 24 Hours of Nürburgring class win.

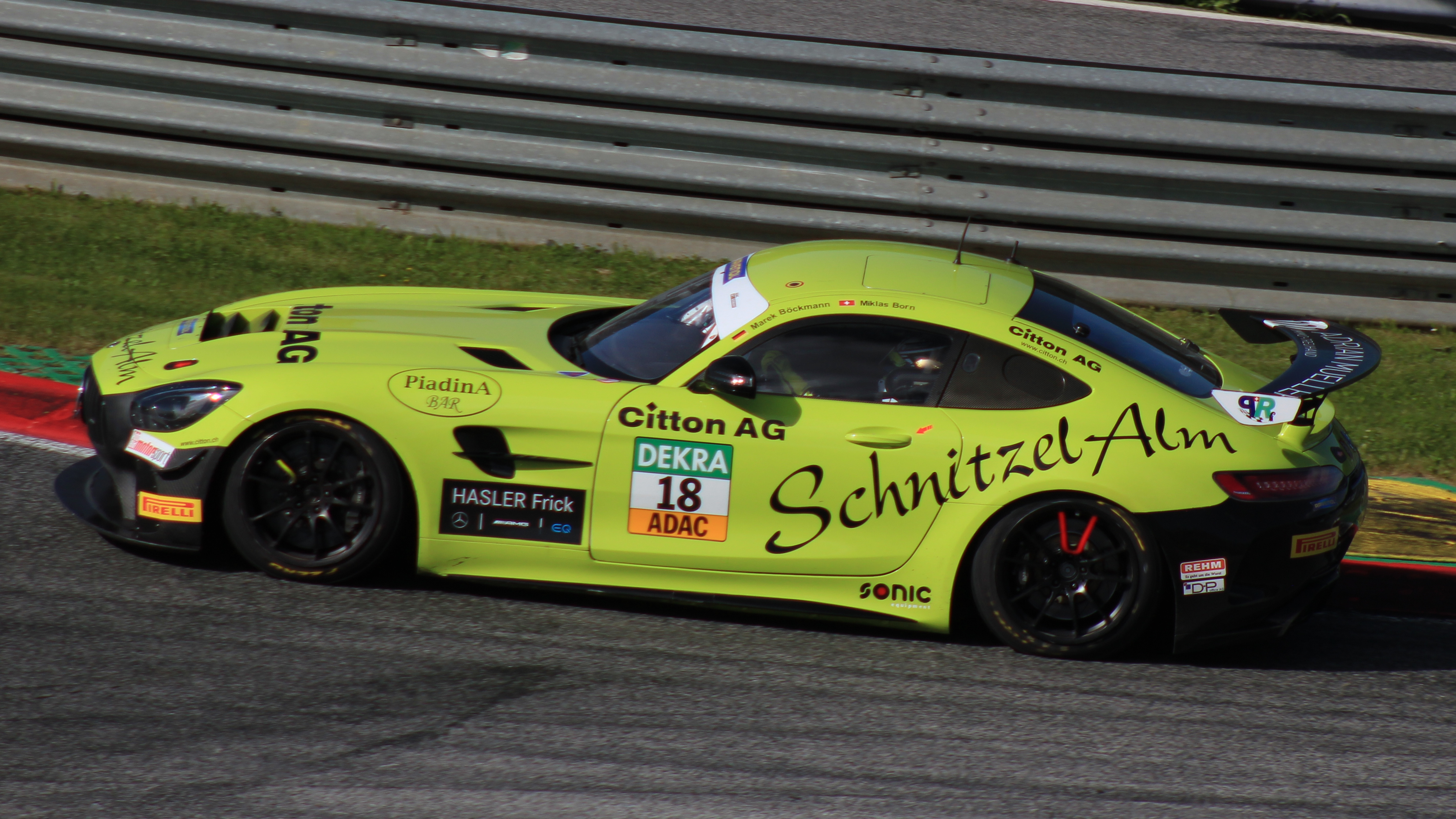
Böckmann's Schnitzelalm Mercedes-AMG GT4 at the Red Bull Ring in 2022.

In 2022, Böckmann joined Schnitzelalm's new SP9 effort in the NLS, as well as contesting most of the ADAC GT4 Germany calendar. Racing primarily alongside Marcel Marchewicz, Böckmann won at the latter's Nürburgring round and took two other podiums to end the year 12th in the overall standings. Staying in SP9 for 2023, Böckmann dabbled between Schnitzelalm's Mercedes and PROsport-Racing's Aston Martin Vantage AMR GT3, most notably winning NLS7 in the Pro-Am subclass with the latter. In 2024, Böckmann continued with PROsport for the full NLS season, scoring an overall podium at NLS6.

Böckmann strengthened his partnership with PROsport for 2025, driving in various classes of the NLS as well as the ADAC GT4 Germany. In the former, Böckmann won twice in SP10, and finished second in SP9 Pro-Am and seventh overall at the 24 Hours of Nürburgring alongside Nico Bastian and Steven Palette. Paired up with Anton Paul Abée for the latter, Böckmann scored pole and second place at the Nürburgring to take 13th in points. In 2026, Böckmann continued with PROsport for another dual campaign in NLS and ADAC GT4 Germany, as the team switched to Mercedes machinery. Between the two campaigns, Böckmann found more success in the latter, taking a lone podium at the Oschersleben to end the season eighth overall.

== Karting record ==
=== Karting career summary ===
Season	Series	Team	Position
2009	ADAC Kart Masters – KF3		12th
2010	South Garda Winter Cup – KF3		
2010	Deutsche Kart-Meisterschaft – KF3		11th
2010	Karting European Championship – KF3	KSM Racing Team	
2010	ADAC Kart Championship – KF3		6th
2010	ADAC Kart Masters – KF3		6th
2010	Ciao Thomas Knopper Memorial – KF3		3rd
2011	South Garda Winter Cup – KF3	KSM Racing Team	90th
2011	Andrea Margutti Trophy – KF3	Team Zimmer	15th
2011	Karting European Championship – KF3		
2011	Deutsche Kart-Meisterschaft – KF3		14th
2011	ADAC Kart Masters – KF3		6th
2011	Ciao Thomas Knopper Memorial – KF3		8th
2012	Deutsche Kart-Meisterschaft – KF1	Dr. Michael Böckmann	21st
2013	South Garda Winter Cup – KF		71st

== Racing record ==
=== Racing career summary ===
Season	Series	Team	Races	Wins	Poles	F/Laps	Podiums	Points	Position
2013	V de V Challenge Monoplace	Elbracht Motorsport	17	0	0	0	5	508	4th
2014	Formula Renault 2.0 Alps Series	Jenzer Motorsport	14	0	0	0	0	10	20th
2015	ADAC Formula 4 Championship	Jenzer Motorsport	24	0	0	0	1	33	17th
2016	Porsche Carrera Cup Germany – A	KÜS Team 75 Bernhard	15	0	0	0	0	103	9th
2017	VLN Series								
2017	24 Hours of Nürburgring – V5	PROsport Performance	1	1	0	0	1	—N/a	**1st**
2017	GT4 European Series Northern Cup – Silver	PROsport Performance	2	0	0	0	0	0	NC
2018	VLN Series – SP9	Gigaspeed Team Getspeed Performance	2	0	0	0	0		
2018	24 Hours of Nürburgring – SP9	Gigaspeed Team Getspeed Performance	1	0	0	0	0	—N/a	15th
2019	VLN Series – SP9	GetSpeed Performance	3	0	0	0	1	9.62	35th
2019	24 Hours of Nürburgring – SP10	Black Falcon Team Identica	1	1	0	0	1	—N/a	**1st**
2019	VLN Series – SP8T	Black Falcon	1	0	0	0	0	5	34th
2020	Nürburgring Langstrecken-Serie – SP-Pro	Black Falcon	5	5	5	5	5	20	**1st**
2020	24 Hours of Nürburgring – SP-Pro	Black Falcon Team Identica	1	1	1	1	1	—N/a	**1st**
2021	Nürburgring Langstrecken-Serie – SP10	Schnitzelalm Racing	8	6	5	0	7	60.67	**2nd**
2021	24 Hours of Nürburgring – SP10	Schnitzelalm Racing	1	1	0	0	1	—N/a	**1st**
2022	Nürburgring Langstrecken-Serie – SP9 Pro	Schnitzelalm Racing	4	0	0	0	0	0	NC
2022	24 Hours of Nürburgring – SP9 Pro-Am	Schnitzelalm Racing	1	0	0	0	0	—N/a	DNF
2022	ADAC GT4 Germany	Schnitzelalm Racing	8	1	0	0	3	71	12th
2023	Nürburgring Langstrecken-Serie – SP9 Pro	Schnitzelalm Racing	1	0	0	0	0	0	NC
2023	Nürburgring Langstrecken-Serie – SP9 Pro	PROsport-Racing	0	0	0	0	0	0	NC
2023	Nürburgring Langstrecken-Serie – BMW M240i	Schnitzelalm Racing	1	0	0	0	1	0	NC
2023	24 Hours of Nürburgring – SP9 Pro-Am	Schnitzelalm Racing	1	0	0	0	0	—N/a	DNF
2023	Nürburgring Langstrecken-Serie – SP9 Pro-Am	PROsport-Racing	4	1	0	0	2	0	NC
2023	ADAC GT4 Germany	PROsport-Racing	2	0	0	0	0	13	29th
2024	Nürburgring Langstrecken-Serie – SP9 Pro-Am	PROsport-Racing	4	0	0	0	1	0	NC
2024	Nürburgring Langstrecken-Serie – SP9 Pro	PROsport-Racing	3	0	0	0	1	0	NC
2024	24 Hours of Nürburgring – SP9 Pro	PROsport-Racing	1	0	0	0	0	—N/a	DNF
2025	ADAC GT4 Germany	PROsport Racing	11	0	1	0	1	49	13th
2025	Nürburgring Langstrecken-Serie – SP9 Pro-Am	PROsport Racing	1	0	0	0	0	0	NC
2025	Nürburgring Langstrecken-Serie – SP10	PROsport Racing	2	2	0	0	2	12	NC
2025	24 Hours of Nürburgring – SP9 Pro-Am	PROsport Racing	1	0	0	0	1	—N/a	**2nd**
2025	Nürburgring Langstrecken-Serie – SP8T	PROsport Racing	2	0	0	0	1	11	NC
2025	Nürburgring Langstrecken-Serie – SP7	PROsport Racing	1	0	0	0	0	0	NC
2026	Nürburgring Langstrecken-Serie – SP9 Am	PROsport Racing	2	0	0	0	0	8	NC
2026	ADAC GT4 Germany	PROsport Racing	9	0	0	0	1	88	8th
2026	24 Hours of Nürburgring – SP9 Pro	PROsport Racing Team Bilstein	1	0	0	0	0	—N/a	DNF
2026	Intercontinental GT Challenge	PROsport Racing Team Bilstein	1	0	0	0	0	0	NC
2026	Nürburgring Langstrecken-Serie – SP9 Pro-Am	PROsport Racing Team Bilstein	1	0	0	0	1	8	NC
2026	Nürburgring Langstrecken-Serie – SP10 Pro-Am	PROsport Racing	1	0	0	0	0	0	NC

^{†} As Böckmann was a guest driver, he was ineligible to score points.

=== Complete Formula Renault 2.0 Alps Series results ===
(key) (Races in bold indicate pole position; races in italics indicate fastest lap)

Year	Team	1	2	3	4	5	6	7	8	9	10	11	12	13	14	Pos	Points
2014	Jenzer Motorsport	IMO; 1; 13	IMO; 2; 26	PAU; 1 Ret	PAU; 2 Ret	RBR; 1; 12	RBR; 2; 16	SPA; 1; 10	SPA; 2; 24	MNZ; 1; 19	MNZ; 2; 13	MUG; 1; 23	MUG; 2; 15	JER; 1; 17	JER; 2; 22	20th	10

=== Complete ADAC Formula 4 Championship results ===
(key) (Races in bold indicate pole position) (Races in italics indicate fastest lap)

Year	Team	1	2	3	4	5	6	7	8	9	10	11	12	13	14	15	16	17	18	19	20	21	22	23	24	DC	Points
2015	Jenzer Motorsport	OSC1; 1; 13	OSC1; 2; 23	OSC1; 3; 28	RBR; 1; 11	RBR; 2; 33	RBR; 3; 29	SPA; 1; 10	SPA; 2; 9	SPA; 3; 26	LAU; 1; 18	LAU; 2 Ret	LAU; 3; 8	NÜR; 1; 33	NÜR; 2; 9	NÜR; 3; 12	SAC; 1 Ret	SAC; 2 Ret	SAC; 3 Ret	OSC2; 1; 8	OSC2; 2; 10	OSC2; 3; 3	HOC; 1; 9	HOC; 2 Ret	HOC; 3; 9	17th	33

=== Complete 24 Hours of Nürburgring results ===
Year	Team	Co-Drivers	Car	Class	Laps	Pos.	Class Pos.
2017	(Germany) PROsport Performance	(Germany) Jürgen Nett (Belgium) Olivier Muytjens (Germany) Dominik Schoning	Porsche Cayman	V5	134	53rd	**1st**
2018	(Germany) Gigaspeed Team Getspeed Performance	(Luxembourg) Steve Jans (Germany) Lucas Luhr (Germany) Jan-Erik Slooten	Porsche 911 GT3 R	SP9	130	16th	15th
2019	(Germany) Black Falcon Team Identica	(Germany) Tobias Müller (Switzerland) Yannick Mettler (Estonia) Tristan Viidas	Mercedes-AMG GT4	SP10	145	17th	**1st**
2020	(Germany) Black Falcon Team Identica	(Germany) Tobias Müller (Luxembourg) Carlos Rivas (Germany) Maik Rosenberg	Porsche 911 GT3 Cup MR	SP-Pro	77	22nd	**1st**
2021	(Germany) Schnitzelalm Racing	(Germany) Marcel Marchewicz (Germany) Tim Neuser (Germany) Reinhold Renger	Mercedes-AMG GT4	SP10	54	25th	**1st**
2022	(Germany) Schnitzelalm Racing	(Germany) Kenneth Heyer (Switzerland) Yannick Mettler (Germany) Johannes Stengel	Mercedes-AMG GT3 Evo	SP9; Pro-Am	44	DNF	DNF
2023	(Germany) Schnitzelalm Racing	(Germany) Marcel Marchewicz (Germany) Kenneth Heyer (Germany) Luca-Sandro Trefz	Mercedes-AMG GT3 Evo	SP9; Pro-Am	43	DNF	DNF
2023	(Germany) Schnitzelalm Racing	(Germany) Patrick Assenheimer (Germany) Marcel Marchewicz (Netherlands) Colin Caresani	Mercedes-AMG GT3 Evo	SP9; Pro-Am	75	DNF	DNF
2024	(Germany) PROsport Racing	(Germany) Nico Bastian (United Kingdom) Ben Green (Germany) Hugo Sasse	Aston Martin Vantage AMR GT3	SP9; Pro	23	DNF	DNF
2025	(Germany) PROsport Racing	(Germany) Nico Bastian (France) Steven Palette	Aston Martin Vantage AMR GT3	SP9; Pro-Am	137	7th	**2nd**
2026	(Germany) PROsport Racing Team Bilstein	(United Kingdom) Adam Christodoulou (Canada) Mikaël Grenier (United Kingdom) Chris Lulham	Mercedes-AMG GT3 Evo	SP9; Pro	115	DNF	DNF

=== Complete ADAC GT4 Germany results ===
(key) (Races in bold indicate pole position) (Races in italics indicate fastest lap)

Year	Team	Car	1	2	3	4	5	6	7	8	9	10	11	12	13	DC	Points
2022	Schnitzelalm Racing	Mercedes-AMG GT4	OSC; 1; 20	OSC; 2; 8	RBR; 1; 3	RBR; 2 Ret	ZAN; 1	ZAN; 2	NÜR; 1; 2	NÜR; 2; 1	SAC; 1; 18	SAC; 2; 15	HOC; 1	HOC; 2		12th	71
2023	PROsport Racing	Aston Martin Vantage AMR GT4	OSC1; 1	OSC1; 2	ZAN; 1	ZAN; 2	NÜR; 1	NÜR; 2	LAU; 1	LAU; 2	SAC; 1	SAC; 2	HOC; 1; 8	HOC; 2; 12		29th	13
2025	PROsport Racing	Aston Martin Vantage AMR GT4	OSC; 1 DNS	OSC; 2; 6	NOR; 1; 18	NOR; 2 Ret	NÜR; 1; 9	**NÜR**; **2**; 2	SAC; 1; 18	SAC; 2; 15	RBR; 1; 14	RBR; 2 Ret	HOC; 1; 10	HOC; 2 Ret		13th	49
2026	PROsport Racing	Mercedes-AMG GT4	RBR; 1; 7	RBR; 2; 8	NOR; 1; 5	NOR; 2; 10	OSC; 1; 2	OSC; 2; 5	NÜR; 1; 10	NÜR; 2; 7	SAC; 1; 8	SAC; 2 C	HOC; 1	HOC; 2	HOC; 3	8th	88
