= Nico Hantke =

German racing driver (born 2004)

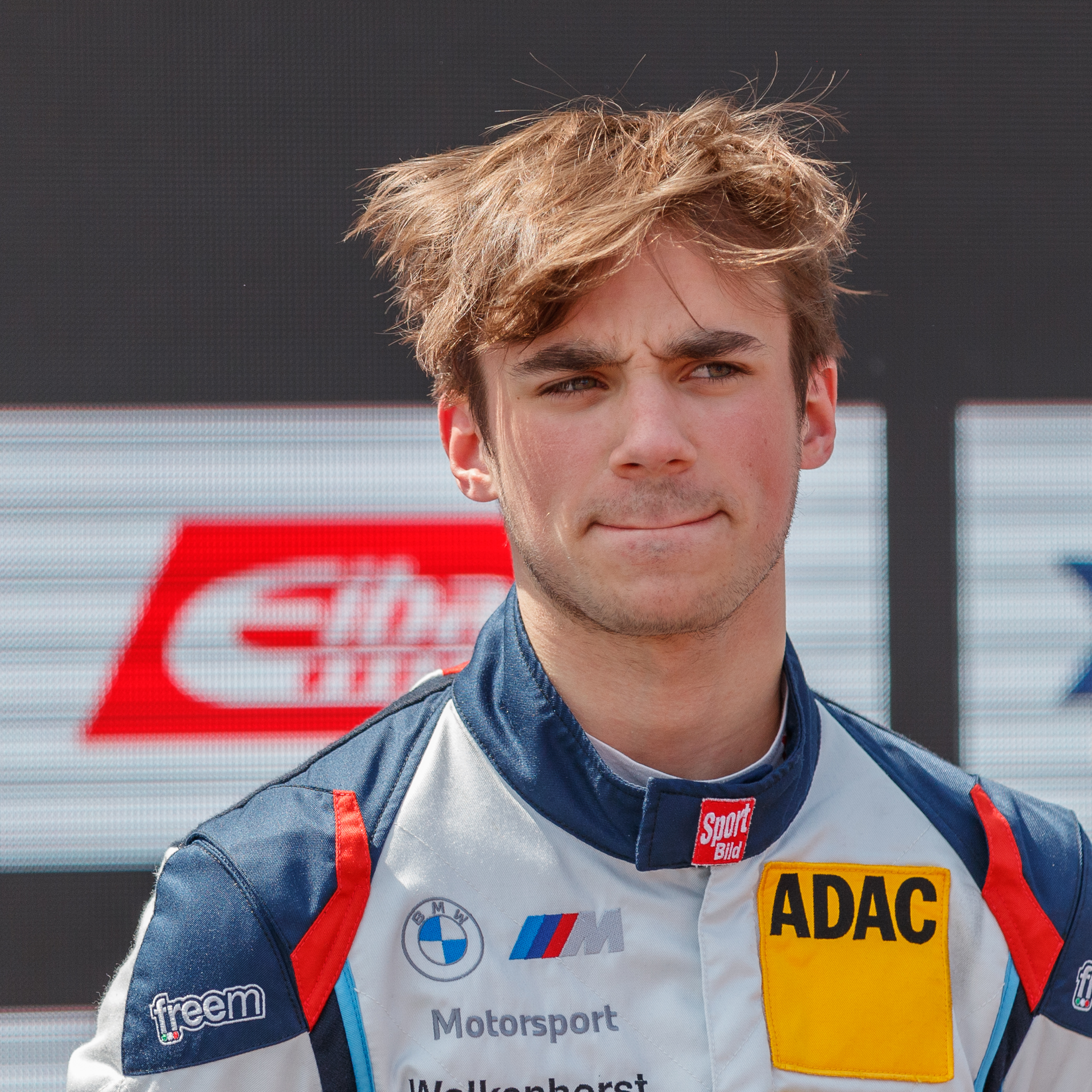
- Hantke in 2023
- Nationality: (Germany) German
- Born: 16 March 2004 (age 22) Cologne, Germany
- Categorisation: FIA Silver

Nico Hantke (born 16 March 2004) is a German racing driver who last competed in the Nürburgring Langstrecken-Serie for Walkenhorst Motorsport.

== Career ==
Born in Cologne, Hantke began competitive karting in 2012. Competing until 2023, Hantke most notably won the 2013 ADAC Kart Bundesendlauf in the Bambini Gazelle category, before being crowned the ADAC West German Kart Cup champion three years later, also in the Bambini class. Hantke then progressed to Junior and later Senior karts, during which he won the Kerpen Winterpokal in 2019, in the OK category.

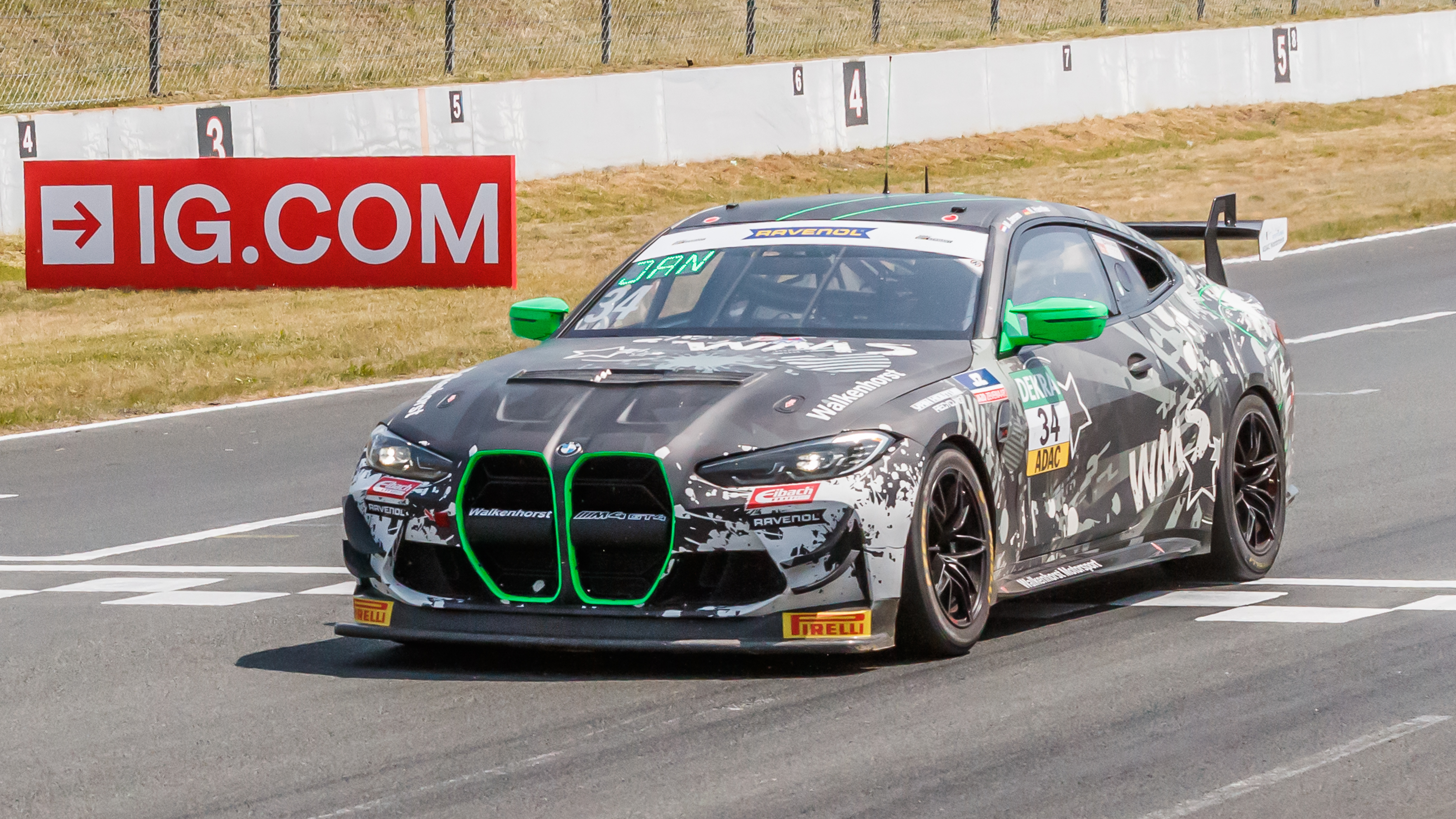
Hantke at the wheel of his Walkenhorst BMW M4 GT4 at Oschersleben in 2023.

In 2021, Hantke stepped up to car racing, joining McLaren-fielding Dörr Motorsport to compete in ADAC GT4 Germany. In their maiden season in the series, Hantke and Ben Dörr took a best result of second in race two at the Hockenheimring en route to a seventh-place points finish. The following year, Hantke returned to Dörr for his second season in ADAC GT4 Germany, this time driving an Aston Martin Vantage AMR GT4 alongside Simon Connor Primm. In his second season with the team, Hantke scored a best result of fourth in race two at the Sachsenring to end the year a lowly 22nd in points. During 2022, Hantke also made a one-off appearance in the GT4 European Series for fellow Aston Martin customer team Racing One, under the Team Spirit Racing banner.

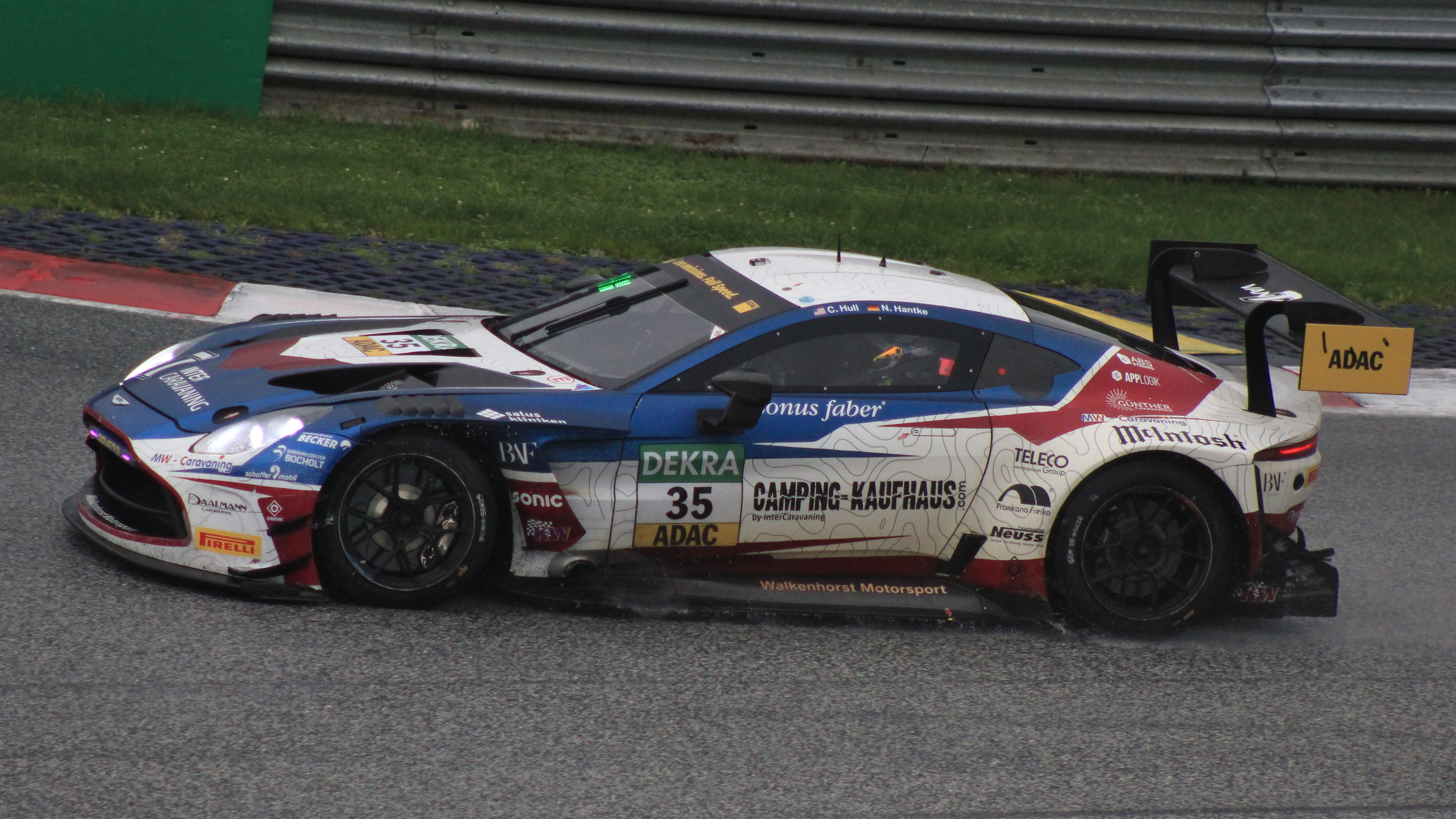
Hantke, pictured at the Red Bull Ring, graduated to GT3 with Walkenhorst and Aston Martin in 2024.

Continuing in ADAC GT4 Germany for 2023, Hantke switched to BMW-aligned Walkenhorst Motorsport alongside Mex Jansen. Starting the year with a pair of third-place finishes at Oschersleben and a second-place at Zandvoort, Hantke then finished third at the Lausitzring and second again at the Sachsenring to take fifth in points. Remaining with Walkenhorst for 2024, Hantke made his full-time debut in GT3 machinery by competing in ADAC GT Masters alongside Chandler Hull aboard an Aston Martin Vantage AMR GT3 Evo. After two rounds in the Silver Cup, the entry was reclassified as a Pro-Am entry and became ineligible for points, as Hantke took a best result of fifth at Spa, but only finished 20th in points with three valid points finishes to his name.

Staying in ADAC GT Masters for 2025, Hantke switched to Audi customer team Scherer Sport PHX for his second season in the series, driving alongside Denis Bulatov. Starting the season with a podium at Lausitzring, Hantke then won race one at the Red Bull Ring from pole, and ended the season with a win at the Hockenheimring to secure fourth in the overall standings. During 2025, Hantke also returned to Walkenhorst Motorsport to race with them in the SP9 Pro-Am class of the 24 Hours of Nürburgring. At the beginning of the following year, Hantke reunited with Scherer Sport PHX to contest NLS2 in the SP9 class, as well as joining Aston Martin customer team Code Racing Development for a one-off appearance in the GT3 class of the Le Mans Cup. Following that, Hantke reunited with Walkenhorst for a part-time campaign in the NLS and the 24 Hours of Nürburgring.

== Karting record ==
=== Karting career summary ===
Season	Series	Team	Position
2012	Euro Wintercup — Bambini		7th
2013	ADAC Kart Bundesendlauf — Bambini Gazelle		1st
2015	Winterpokal Kerpen — Bambini		3rd
2015	ADAC Kart Bundesendlauf — Bambini		4th
2016	ADAC Kart Bundesendlauf — Bambini		2nd
2016	ADAC Kart Masters — Bambini		6th
2017	Andrea Margutti Trophy — OK-J	Hantke	26th
2017	ADAC Kart Masters — OK-J		19th
2017	Karting World Championship — OK-J	3G Racing	NC
2018	South Garda Winter Cup — OK-J	Alfred Horst	NC
2018	Andrea Margutti Trophy — OK-J	3G Racing	32nd
2018	Deutsche Kart-Meisterschaft — OK-J	3G Racing	20th
2018	Karting European Championship — OK-J	3G Racing	74th
2018	Karting World Championship — OK-J	3G Racing	NC
2018	WSK Final Cup — OK	3G Racing	53rd
2019	Kerpen Winterpokal — OK	3G Racing	1st
2019	South Garda Winter Cup — OK	3G Racing	NC
2019	Deutsche Kart-Meisterschaft — OK	3G Racing	14th
2019	Deutsche Elektro-Kart-Meisterschaft	3G Racing	NC
2019	Karting European Championship — OK	3G Racing	61st
2019	WSK Open Cup — OK	3G Racing	39th
2020	WSK Super Master Series — OK	KSM Official Racing Team	99th
2020	South Garda Winter Cup — OK	KSM Official Racing Team	NC
2020	ADAC Kart Masters — OK		10th
2020	Karting European Championship — OK	Ward Racing	36th
2020	ROK Cup International Final — Senior Rok	Kart-Club Kerpen e.v.	34th
2020	Karting World Championship — OK	Ward Racing	30th
2022	RMC Euro Trophy — Senior Max	3G Racing	24th
2023	RMC Germany — Senior Max		8th

== Racing record ==
=== Racing career summary ===
Season	Series	Team	Races	Wins	Poles	F/Laps	Podiums	Points	Position
2021	ADAC GT4 Germany	Dörr Motorsport	12	0	0	0	1	96	7th
2022	ADAC GT4 Germany	Dörr Motorsport	12	0	0	0	0	44	22nd
2022	GT4 European Series – Silver	Team Spirit Racing	2	0	0	0	0	2	23rd
2023	ADAC GT4 Germany	Walkenhorst Motorsport	12	0	0	0	5	116	5th
2023	Nürburgring Langstrecken-Serie – V4		2	0	0	0	0	0	NC
2023	Nürburgring Langstrecken-Serie – VT2-FWD	Walkenhorst Motorsport	1	0	0	0	0	0	NC
2024	ADAC GT Masters	Walkenhorst Motorsport	12	0	0	0	0	10	20th
2024	24 Hours of Nürburgring – SP10	Walkenhorst Motorsport	1	0	0	0	0	—N/a	7th
2025	ADAC GT Masters	Scherer Sport PHX	10	2	1	0	4	144	4th
2025	Nürburgring Langstrecken-Serie – SP9 Pro-Am	Walkenhorst Motorsport	1	0	0	0	1	6	NC
2025	24 Hours of Nürburgring – SP9 Pro-Am	Walkenhorst Motorsport	1	0	0	0	0	—N/a	DNF
2026	Nürburgring Langstrecken-Serie – SP9	Scherer Sport PHX	1	0	0	0	0	4	NC
2026	Le Mans Cup – GT3	Code Racing Development	1	0	1	0	0	1	20th
2026	Nürburgring Langstrecken-Serie – SP9 Pro-Am	Walkenhorst Motorsport	0	0	0	0	0	14	NC
2026	Nürburgring Langstrecken-Serie – SP9 Pro-Am	Car Collection Motorsport	2	0	0	0	1	14	NC
2026	24 Hours of Nürburgring – SP9 Pro-Am	Walkenhorst Motorsport	1	0	0	0	0	—N/a	DNF
2026	ADAC GT Masters	PROsport Racing	2	0	0	0	0	0	NC†
2026	Nürburgring Langstrecken-Serie – SP10 Pro-Am	PROsport Racing	1	0	0	0	1	8	NC
2026	Nürburgring Langstrecken-Serie – SP7	PROsport Racing	1	0	0	0	0	0	NC

=== Complete ADAC GT4 Germany results ===
(key) (Races in bold indicate pole position) (Races in italics indicate fastest lap)

Year	Team	Car	1	2	3	4	5	6	7	8	9	10	11	12	DC	Points
2021	Dörr Motorsport	McLaren 570S GT4	OSC; 1; 15	OSC; 2; 13	RBR; 1; 11	RBR; 2; 4	ZAN; 1; 14	ZAN; 2; 7	SAC; 1 Ret	SAC; 2; 24	HOC; 1; 10	HOC; 2; 2	**NÜR**; **1**; 4	NÜR; 2; 6	7th	96
2022	Dörr Motorsport	Aston Martin Vantage AMR GT4	OSC; 1; 8	OSC; 2; 11	RBR; 1; 15	**RBR**; **2** Ret	ZAN; 1; 13	ZAN; 2; 12	NÜR; 1; 15	NÜR; 2; 14	SAC; 1; 14	SAC; 2; 4	HOC; 1; 12	HOC; 2 Ret	22nd	44
2023	Walkenhorst Motorsport	BMW M4 GT4	OSC; 1; 3	OSC; 2; 3	ZAN; 1; 5	ZAN; 2; 2	NÜR; 1; 21	NÜR; 2 Ret	LAU; 1; 3	LAU; 2 Ret	SAC; 1; 25	SAC; 2; 2	HOC; 1; 7	HOC; 2; 9	5th	116

=== Complete ADAC GT Masters results ===
(key) (Races in bold indicate pole position) (Races in italics indicate fastest lap)

Year	Team	Car	1	2	3	4	5	6	7	8	9	10	11	12	Pos.	Points
2024	Walkenhorst Motorsport	Aston Martin Vantage AMR GT3 Evo	OSC; 1; 12	OSC; 2; 13	ZAN; 1; 16†	ZAN; 2; 13	NÜR; 1; 12	NÜR; 2; 11	SPA; 1; 5	SPA; 2 Ret	RBR; 1; 17	RBR; 2; 13	HOC; 1; 11	HOC; 2; 13	20th	10
2025	Scherer Sport PHX	Audi R8 LMS Evo II	LAU; 1; 5	LAU; 2; 2	ZAN; 1; 10	ZAN; 2; 8^{3}	NÜR; 1; 9	NÜR; 2; 5	SAL; 1 WD	SAL; 2 WD	**RBR**; **1**; 1^{1}	RBR; 2; 6	HOC; 1; 1	HOC; 2; 3^{3}	4th	144
2026	PROsport Racing	Mercedes-AMG GT3 Evo	RBR; 1	RBR; 2	ZAN; 1	ZAN; 2	LAU; 1	LAU; 2	NÜR; 1; 16	NÜR; 2; 15	SAL; 1	SAL; 2	HOC; 1	HOC; 2	NC‡	0‡

=== Complete Le Mans Cup results ===
(key) (Races in bold indicate pole position) (Races in italics indicate the fastest lap)

Year	Entrant	Car	Class	1	2	3	4	5	6	DC	Points
2026	Code Racing Development	Aston Martin Vantage AMR GT3 Evo	GT3	**BAR**; Ret	LEC	LMS	SPA	SIL	POR	20th	1

^{*} Season still in progress.
