= Simon Connor Primm =

German racing driver (born 2005)

- Primm in 2023
- Nationality: (Germany) German
- Born: 22 February 2005 (age 21) Großschirma, Germany

ADAC GT Masters career
- Debut season: 2023
- Current team: HGL Racing
- Categorisation: FIA Silver
- Car number: 77
- Former teams: Paul Motorsport
- Starts: 38
- Wins: 1
- Podiums: 5
- Poles: 3
- Fastest laps: 3
- Best finish: 8th in 2025

Previous series
- 2022–2023: ADAC GT4 Germany

Championship titles
- 2026 2023: GT Summer Series – GT4 Pro; ADAC GT4 Germany – Junior

Simon Connor Primm (born 22 February 2005) is a German racing driver who last competed in ADAC GT Masters for HGL Racing.

== Career ==
Primm competed in karting between 2015 and 2022. Starting out in Bambini karts, Primm most notably won the 2015 Ostdeutscher ADAC Kart Cup title, as well as finishing runner-up in the Nordostdeutschen ADAC Kart Challenge the same year. Moving up to junior karts in 2017, Primm clinched third in the ADAC Kart Bundesendlauf standings on debut, before winning the ADAC Kart Cup title the following year. After a year in senior karts in 2019, Primm spent the final three years of his karting career primarily in KZ2 shifter karts, where he most notably finished fifth in the 2020 Deutsche Kart-Meisterschaft and the 2021 WSK Final Cup.

Parallel to his final year of karting in 2022, Primm made his car racing debut in ADAC GT4 Germany, sharing Dörr Motorsport's Aston Martin Vantage AMR GT4 with Nico Hantke. Despite a shock pole at the Red Bull Ring, the duo only managed a best result of fourth on their way to 22nd in points. For 2023, Primm moved to AMG-fielding CV Performance Group. Partnering Jan Philipp Springob in the six-round season, Primm took his maiden GT4 wins at Oschersleben and the Nürburgring en route to fourth in the overall standings, as he also claimed the junior title. Primm also made one-off appearances for Lamborghini-fielding Paul Motorsport in ADAC GT Masters and the GT World Challenge Europe Sprint Cup, scoring an overall podium in the former and a Silver Cup podium in the latter.

Primm's Paul Motorsport Lamborghini, which won once in ADAC GT Masters in 2024.

Primm graduated to GT3 for 2024, contesting the full ADAC GT Masters for Paul Motorsport alongside Jonas Greif, as a new Lamborghini GT3 Junior driver. In his rookie season, Primm inherited pole at Zandvoort and took a best finish of seventh at the Red Bull Ring to end the year 12th overall. Primm also made a one-off appearance in International GT Open at the Hungaroring for Oregon Team, in which he won race two with Leonardo Pulcini. Continuing with Paul Motorsport for 2025, Primm was joined by Finn Zulauf in the team's Lamborghini Huracán GT3 Evo 2. Despite two poles for Zulauf, the pair only won at Zandvoort and took third at the Nürburgring to round out the year eighth overall.

Primm's carbon-liveried Audi at the Red Bull Ring in 2026.

In 2026, Primm moved to Seyffarth Motorsport–run HGL Racing to drive an Audi R8 LMS Evo II in ADAC GT Masters with Robin Rogalski. He took pole position and second place at the Lausitzring, before ending the season with another podium at the Hockenheimring to end the year ninth in points. During that year, Primm made his DTM debut with Seyffarth, as a guest entry at his home track of Sachsenring. The effort was put together in just two weeks, with help from Primm's former team Paul Motorsport. Primm finished 15th and 16th in the races, as the only Audi on the grid.

== Personal life ==
Primm's younger brother, Leon Taylor Primm, is a former racing driver.

== Karting record ==
=== Karting career summary ===
Season	Series	Team	Position
2015	ADAC Kart Bundesendlauf — Bambini Light		4th
2016	ADAC Kart Bundesendlauf — Bambini		10th
2017	Andrea Margutti Trophy — OK-J	Team NKS	20th
2017	Deutsche Kart-Meisterschaft — OK-J		28th
2017	ADAC Kart Bundesendlauf — OK-J		3rd
2017	ADAC Kart Masters — OK-J		16th
2017	WSK Final Cup — OK-J		23rd
2018	WSK Champions Cup — OK-J	DR Srl	NC
2018	South Garda Winter Cup — OK-J	DR Srl	NC
2018	Andrea Margutti Trophy — OK-J	Team NKS	25th
2018	Deutsche Kart-Meisterschaft — OK-J		38th
2018	ADAC Kart Bundesendlauf — OK-J		2nd
2018	WSK Final Cup — OK-J	DR Srl	103rd
2019	WSK Super Master Series — OK	Kartshop Ampfing	69th
2019	WSK Euro Series — OK	Kartshop Ampfing	65th
2019	Deutsche Kart-Meisterschaft — OK		
2019	ADAC Kart Bundesendlauf — OK		5th
2019	ADAC Kart Cup — OK		5th
2020	South Garda Winter Cup — KZ2	Valier Motorsport	63rd
2020	ADAC Kart Masters — KZ2		9th
2021	Andrea Margutti Trophy — KZ2	Valier Motorsport	16th
2021	Deutsche Kart-Meisterschaft — KZ2		13th
2021	ADAC Kart Bundesendlauf — KZ2		12th
2021	ADAC Kart Masters — KZ2		7th
2021	Karting European Championship — KZ2	Valier Motorsport	NC
2021	WSK Final Cup — KZ2	NB Motorsport	5th
2022	WSK Super Master Series — KZ2	NB Motorsport	81st
2022	Deutsche Kart-Meisterschaft — KZ2		14th
2022	Karting European Championship — KZ	Dörr Motorsport	NC
2022	ADAC Kart Masters — KZ2		

== Racing record ==
=== Racing career summary ===
Season	Series	Team	Races	Wins	Poles	F/Laps	Podiums	Points	Position
2022	ADAC GT4 Germany	Dörr Motorsport	12	0	1	0	0	44	22nd
2023	ADAC GT4 Germany	CV Performance Group	12	2	0	1	3	130	4th
2023	ADAC GT Masters	Paul Motorsport	2	0	0	0	1	26	23rd
2023	GT World Challenge Europe Sprint Cup	Paul Motorsport	2	0	0	0	0	0	NC
2023	GT World Challenge Europe Sprint Cup – Silver	Paul Motorsport	2	0	0	0	1	10.5	16th
2024	ADAC GT Masters	Paul Motorsport	12	0	1	0	0	77	12th
2024	International GT Open	Oregon Team	2	1	0	0	1	23	18th
2025	ADAC GT Masters	Paul Motorsport	12	1	0	0	2	122	8th
2026	ADAC GT Masters	HGL Racing	12	0	1	3	2	121	9th
2026	Deutsche Tourenwagen Masters	Seyffarth Motorsport	2	0	0	0	0	0	NC†
2026	GT Summer Series – GT4 Pro	CV Performance Group	3	3	3	3	3	30	**1st**
2026	ADAC GT4 Germany	CV Performance X JP Motorsport	3	0	0	0	0	14	22nd

^{†} As Primm was a guest driver, he was ineligible to score points.

=== Complete ADAC GT4 Germany results ===
(key) (Races in bold indicate pole position) (Races in italics indicate fastest lap)

Year	Team	Car	1	2	3	4	5	6	7	8	9	10	11	12	13	DC	Points
2022	Dörr Motorsport	Aston Martin Vantage AMR GT4	OSC; 1; 8	OSC; 2; 11	RBR; 1; 15	**RBR**; **2** Ret	ZAN; 1; 13	ZAN; 2; 12	NÜR; 1; 15	NÜR; 2; 14	SAC; 1; 14	SAC; 2; 4	HOC; 1; 12	HOC; 2 Ret		22nd	44
2023	CV Performance Group	Mercedes-AMG GT4	OSC; 1; 1	OSC; 2; 7	ZAN; 1; 13	ZAN; 2; 9	NÜR; 1; 1	NÜR; 2; 3	LAU; 1; 8	LAU; 2; 6	SAC; 1; 15	SAC; 2; 4	HOC; 1; 4	HOC; 2 DNS		4th	130
2026	CV Performance X JP Motorsport	Mercedes-AMG GT4	RBR; 1	RBR; 2	NOR; 1	NOR; 2	OSC; 1	OSC; 2	NÜR; 1	NÜR; 2	SAC; 1	SAC; 2	HOC; 1; 7	HOC; 2 Ret	HOC; 3; 11	22nd	14

=== Complete ADAC GT Masters results ===
(key) (Races in bold indicate pole position) (Races in italics indicate fastest lap)

Year	Team	Car	1	2	3	4	5	6	7	8	9	10	11	12	DC	Points
2023	Paul Motorsport	Lamborghini Huracán GT3 Evo 2	HOC1; 1	HOC1; 2	NOR; 1	NOR; 2	NÜR; 1; 3^{3}	NÜR; 2; 7	SAC; 1	SAC; 2	RBR; 1	RBR; 2	HOC2; 1	HOC2; 2	23th	26
2024	Paul Motorsport	Lamborghini Huracán GT3 Evo 2	OSC; 1; 10	OSC; 2; 10	ZAN; 1; 13	**ZAN**; **2**; 13^{1}	NÜR; 1; 10	NÜR; 2; 8	SPA; 1; 12	SPA; 2; 10	RBR; 1; 7^{3}	RBR; 2; 14	HOC; 1; 14	HOC; 2; 11	12th	77
2025	Paul Motorsport	Lamborghini Huracán GT3 Evo 2	**LAU**; **1**; 13^{1}	LAU; 2 Ret	ZAN; 1; 1^{3}	**ZAN**; **2**; 4^{1}	NÜR; 1; 3	NÜR; 2; 7	SAL; 1; 5	SAL; 2; 7	RBR; 1; 6	RBR; 2 Ret	HOC; 1; 5	HOC; 2; 11	8th	122
2026	HGL Racing	Audi R8 LMS Evo II	RBR; 1; 4	RBR; 2; 8	ZAN; 1; 13	ZAN; 2 Ret	LAU; 1; 7	**LAU**; **2**; 2^{1}	NÜR; 1; 8	NÜR; 2; 10	SAL; 1; 6^{3}	SAL; 2; 7	HOC; 1; 3^{3}	HOC; 2; 6	9th	121

=== Complete GT World Challenge Europe results ===
==== GT World Challenge Europe Sprint Cup ====
(key) (Races in bold indicate pole position) (Races in italics indicate fastest lap)

Year	Team	Car	Class	1	2	3	4	5	6	7	8	9	10	Pos.	Points
2023	Paul Motorsport	Lamborghini Huracán GT3 Evo	Silver	BRH; 1	BRH; 2	MIS; 1	MIS; 2	HOC; 1; 15	**HOC**; **2** Ret	VAL; 1	VAL; 2	ZAN; 1	ZAN; 2	16th	10.5

=== Complete Deutsche Tourenwagen Masters results ===
(key) (Races in bold indicate pole position) (Races in italics indicate fastest lap)

Year	Team	Car	1	2	3	4	5	6	7	8	9	10	11	12	13	14	15	16	Pos.	Points
2026	Seyffarth Motorsport	Audi R8 LMS Evo II	RBR; 1	RBR; 2	ZAN; 1	ZAN; 2	LAU; 1	LAU; 2	NOR; 1	NOR; 2	OSC; 1	OSC; 2	NÜR; 1	NÜR; 2	SAC; 1; 15	SAC; 2; 16	HOC; 1	HOC; 2	NC‡	0‡

^{‡} As Primm was a guest driver, he was ineligible to score points.
