= 2022 ADAC GT4 Germany =

Sports car championship

The 2022 ADAC GT4 Germany season is the fourth season of the ADAC GT4 Germany, a sports car championship created and organised by the ADAC. The season began on 23 April at Oschersleben and will end on 23 October at the Hockenheimring.

== Calendar ==
Round	Circuit	Date
1	Motorsport Arena Oschersleben, Oschersleben, Germany	22–24 April
2	Red Bull Ring, Spielberg, Austria	20–22 May
3	Circuit Zandvoort, Zandvoort, Netherlands	24–26 June
4	Nürburgring, Nürburg, Germany	5–7 August
5	Sachsenring, Hohenstein-Ernstthal, Germany	23–25 September
6	Hockenheimring, Hockenheim, Germany	21–23 October

== Entry list ==
Team	Car	No.	Drivers	Class	Rounds
(Switzerland) Hofor Racing by Bonk Motorsport	BMW M4 GT4	1	(Italy) Gabriele Piana		All
(Switzerland) Hofor Racing by Bonk Motorsport	BMW M4 GT4	1	(Germany) Michael Schrey		All
(Switzerland) Hofor Racing by Bonk Motorsport	BMW M4 GT4	2	(Germany) Max Rosam	J	All
(Switzerland) Hofor Racing by Bonk Motorsport	BMW M4 GT4	2	(Germany) Tim Reiter		All
(Germany) Drago Racing Team zvo	Mercedes-AMG GT4	4	(United States) Robert Haub		All
(Germany) Drago Racing Team zvo	Mercedes-AMG GT4	4	(Czech Republic) Gabriela Jílková		1–4
(Germany) Drago Racing Team zvo	Mercedes-AMG GT4	4	(France) Théo Nouet		5–6
(Germany) Drago Racing Team zvo	Mercedes-AMG GT4	8	(Germany) Jan Philipp Springbob		All
(Germany) Drago Racing Team zvo	Mercedes-AMG GT4	8	(Austria) Nico Gruber		1–3
(Germany) Drago Racing Team zvo	Mercedes-AMG GT4	8	(Germany) Robin Falkenbach		4–6
(Germany) Racing One	Aston Martin Vantage AMR GT4	6	(United Kingdom) Tom Wood		All
(Germany) Racing One	Aston Martin Vantage AMR GT4	6	(United Kingdom) Euan McKay		1–5
(Germany) Racing One	Aston Martin Vantage AMR GT4	6	(United Kingdom) Will Tregurtha		6
(Germany) Dörr Motorsport	Aston Martin Vantage AMR GT4	7	(Germany) Ben Dörr	J	All
(Germany) Dörr Motorsport	Aston Martin Vantage AMR GT4	7	(France) Romain Leroux	J	All
(Germany) Dörr Motorsport	Aston Martin Vantage AMR GT4	69	(Germany) Phil Dörr		All
(Germany) Dörr Motorsport	Aston Martin Vantage AMR GT4	69	(Netherlands) Indy Dontje		All
(Germany) Dörr Motorsport	Aston Martin Vantage AMR GT4	95	(Germany) Simon Connor Primm	J	All
(Germany) Dörr Motorsport	Aston Martin Vantage AMR GT4	95	(Germany) Nico Hantke	J	All
(Germany) Dörr Motorsport	Aston Martin Vantage AMR GT4	97	(Germany) Juliano Holzem	J	All
(Germany) Dörr Motorsport	Aston Martin Vantage AMR GT4	97	(Germany) Sandro Holzem	J	All
(Bulgaria) Overdrive Racing	Porsche 718 Cayman GT4 Clubsport	9	(Germany) Joachim Bölting	T	All
(Bulgaria) Overdrive Racing	Porsche 718 Cayman GT4 Clubsport	9	(Bulgaria) Tano Neumann	T	All
(Bulgaria) Overdrive Racing	Porsche 718 Cayman GT4 Clubsport	23	(Bulgaria) Pavel Lefterov		All
(Bulgaria) Overdrive Racing	Porsche 718 Cayman GT4 Clubsport	23	(Bulgaria) Stefan Bostandjiev	J	All
(Bulgaria) Overdrive Racing	Porsche 718 Cayman GT4 Clubsport	73	(Bulgaria) Aleks Stefanov		4–6
(Bulgaria) Overdrive Racing	Porsche 718 Cayman GT4 Clubsport	73	(Germany) André Bruckmann	T	4, 6
(Bulgaria) Overdrive Racing	Porsche 718 Cayman GT4 Clubsport	73	(Israel) Alon Gabbay	J	5
(Germany) Schubert Motorsport	BMW M4 GT4	10	(Germany) Patrick Steinmetz		All
(Germany) Schubert Motorsport	BMW M4 GT4	10	(Germany) Michael von Zabiensky		All
(Germany) Piro Sports - Burg Zelem Foundation	Toyota GR Supra GT4	12	(Germany) Marcel Lenerz		All
(Germany) Piro Sports - Burg Zelem Foundation	Toyota GR Supra GT4	12	(Germany) Cedric Piro		All
(Austria) Razoon - more than Racing	KTM X-Bow GT4	14	(Austria) Daniel Drexel		2
(Austria) Razoon - more than Racing	KTM X-Bow GT4	14	(Austria) Horst Felix Felbermayr		2
(Germany) Schnitzelalm Racing	Mercedes-AMG GT4	15	(Germany) Marcel Marchewicz		1–2
(Germany) Schnitzelalm Racing	Mercedes-AMG GT4	15	(Germany) Robin Falkenbach		1–2
(Germany) Schnitzelalm Racing	Mercedes-AMG GT4	15	(Germany) Yves Volte		4
(Germany) Schnitzelalm Racing	Mercedes-AMG GT4	15	(Germany) Roland Froese		4
(Germany) Schnitzelalm Racing	Mercedes-AMG GT4	15	(Germany) Tim Neuer		5
(Germany) Schnitzelalm Racing	Mercedes-AMG GT4	15	(Germany) Dominik Fugel		5
(Germany) Schnitzelalm Racing	Mercedes-AMG GT4	18	(Germany) Marek Böckmann		1–2, 4–5
(Germany) Schnitzelalm Racing	Mercedes-AMG GT4	18	(Switzerland) Miklas Born	J	1–2
(Germany) Schnitzelalm Racing	Mercedes-AMG GT4	18	(Germany) Marcel Marchewicz		4–5
(Germany) EastSide Motorsport	Mercedes-AMG GT4	19	(Germany) Ruben Zeltner		5
(Germany) EastSide Motorsport	Mercedes-AMG GT4	19	(Germany) Ralf Grösel		5
(Germany) EastSide Motorsport	Mercedes-AMG GT4	20	(Germany) Lukas Mayer		All
(Germany) EastSide Motorsport	Mercedes-AMG GT4	20	(Germany) Denis Bulatov		All
(Germany) Allied-Racing	Porsche 718 Cayman GT4 Clubsport	22	(Germany) Vincent Andronaco	J	All
(Germany) Allied-Racing	Porsche 718 Cayman GT4 Clubsport	22	(Germany) Paul-Aurel König	J	1–2
(Germany) Allied-Racing	Porsche 718 Cayman GT4 Clubsport	22	(Austria) Leo Pichler	J	3–6
(Germany) Allied-Racing	Porsche 718 Cayman GT4 Clubsport	26	(Luxembourg) Tom Kieffer	T	All
(Germany) Allied-Racing	Porsche 718 Cayman GT4 Clubsport	26	(Luxembourg) Christian Kosch	T	All
(Germany) Allied-Racing	Porsche 718 Cayman GT4 Clubsport	44	(Denmark) Alexander Hartvig	J	All
(Germany) Allied-Racing	Porsche 718 Cayman GT4 Clubsport	44	(Germany) Moritz Wiskirchen	J	All
(Germany) PROsport Racing	Aston Martin Vantage AMR GT4	24	(Germany) Mike David Ortmann		All
(Germany) PROsport Racing	Aston Martin Vantage AMR GT4	24	(Germany) Hugo Sasse	J	All
(Germany) PROsport Racing	Aston Martin Vantage AMR GT4	25	(Germany) Leon Wassertheurer	J	6
(Germany) PROsport Racing	Aston Martin Vantage AMR GT4	25	(Germany) Donar Munding	J	6
(Germany) PROsport Racing	Aston Martin Vantage AMR GT4	32	(Germany) Leon Wassertheurer	J	4–5
(Germany) PROsport Racing	Aston Martin Vantage AMR GT4	32	(Germany) Donar Munding	J	4–5
(Germany) PROsport Racing	Aston Martin Vantage AMR GT4	48	(Ukraine) Yevgen Sokolovskiy	T	All
(Germany) PROsport Racing	Aston Martin Vantage AMR GT4	48	(Germany) Christopher Röhner		1–5
(Germany) PROsport Racing	Aston Martin Vantage AMR GT4	48	(Ukraine) Ivan Peklin		6
(Germany) W&S Motorsport	Porsche 718 Cayman GT4 Clubsport	30	(Germany) Max Kronberg		All
(Germany) W&S Motorsport	Porsche 718 Cayman GT4 Clubsport	30	(Germany) Hendrik Still		All
(Germany) W&S Motorsport	Porsche 718 Cayman GT4 Clubsport	32	(Austria) Leo Pichler	J	1–2
(Germany) W&S Motorsport	Porsche 718 Cayman GT4 Clubsport	32	(Germany) Leon Wassertheurer	J	1–2
(Germany) AVIA W&S Motorsport	Porsche 718 Cayman GT4 Clubsport	31	(Germany) Finn Zulauf	J	All
(Germany) AVIA W&S Motorsport	Porsche 718 Cayman GT4 Clubsport	31	(Denmark) Nicolaj Møller Madsen		1–5
(Germany) AVIA W&S Motorsport	Porsche 718 Cayman GT4 Clubsport	31	(Germany) Lukas Schreier		6
(Germany) Black Falcon Team Textar	Porsche 718 Cayman GT4 Clubsport	33	(Germany) Axel Sartingen	T	1–4
(Germany) Black Falcon Team Textar	Porsche 718 Cayman GT4 Clubsport	33	(Germany) Daniel Schwerfeld	T	1–4
(Germany) Team Speed Monkeys	Aston Martin Vantage AMR GT4	63	(Germany) Jacob Riegel	J	3
(Germany) Team Speed Monkeys	Aston Martin Vantage AMR GT4	63	(Spain) Marc de Fulgencio		3
(Germany) Team Speed Monkeys	Aston Martin Vantage AMR GT4	99	(Germany) Paul-Aurel König	J	3–4
(Germany) Team Speed Monkeys	Aston Martin Vantage AMR GT4	99	(Switzerland) Konstantin Lachenauer	J	3–4
(Germany) CV Performance Group	Mercedes-AMG GT4	83	(Germany) Philipp Gogollok	J	4–6
(Germany) CV Performance Group	Mercedes-AMG GT4	83	(United States) Phillippe Denes		4
(Germany) CV Performance Group	Mercedes-AMG GT4	83	(Czech Republic) Josef Knopp	J	6
(Germany) CV Performance Group	Mercedes-AMG GT4	84	(Germany) Ferdinand Winter	J	All
(Germany) CV Performance Group	Mercedes-AMG GT4	84	(Germany) Ricardo Dort	J	1–3
(Germany) CV Performance Group	Mercedes-AMG GT4	84	(Switzerland) Lucas Mauron		4
(Germany) CV Performance Group	Mercedes-AMG GT4	84	(Austria) Nico Gruber		5–6
(Germany) CV Performance Group	Mercedes-AMG GT4	85	(Germany) Julian Hanses		All
(Germany) CV Performance Group	Mercedes-AMG GT4	85	(Germany) Theo Oeverhaus	J	1, 3–4, 6
(Germany) CV Performance Group	Mercedes-AMG GT4	85	(France) Théo Nouet		2
(Germany) CV Performance Group	Mercedes-AMG GT4	85	(United Kingdom) Will Tregurtha		5
(Czech Republic) RTR Projects	KTM X-Bow GT4	89	(Czech Republic) Josef Knopp	J	1–5
(Czech Republic) RTR Projects	KTM X-Bow GT4	89	(Czech Republic) Matěj Pavlíček	J	1–4
(Czech Republic) RTR Projects	KTM X-Bow GT4	89	(Austria) Reinhard Kofler		5
(Czech Republic) RTR Projects	KTM X-Bow GT4	89	(Czech Republic) Erik Janiš		6
(Czech Republic) RTR Projects	KTM X-Bow GT4	89	(Germany) Lennart Marioneck		6

Icon	Legend
J	Junior
T	Trophy

== Results ==
Round		Circuit	Date	Pole position	Race winner
1	R1	(Germany) Motorsport Arena Oschersleben	23 April	(Germany) #69 Dörr Motorsport	(Germany) #69 Dörr Motorsport
1	R1	(Germany) Motorsport Arena Oschersleben	23 April	(Germany) Phil Dörr (Netherlands) Indy Dontje	(Germany) Phil Dörr (Netherlands) Indy Dontje
1	R2	(Germany) Motorsport Arena Oschersleben	24 April	(Germany) #6 Racing One	(Germany) #22 Allied-Racing
1	R2	(Germany) Motorsport Arena Oschersleben	24 April	(United Kingdom) Euan McKay (United Kingdom) Tom Wood	(Germany) Vincent Andronaco (Germany) Paul-Aurel König
2	R1	(Austria) Red Bull Ring	21 May	(Switzerland) #1 Hofor Racing by Bonk Motorsport	(Switzerland) #1 Hofor Racing by Bonk Motorsport
2	R1	(Austria) Red Bull Ring	21 May	(Italy) Gabriele Piana (Germany) Michael Schrey	(Italy) Gabriele Piana (Germany) Michael Schrey
2	R2	(Austria) Red Bull Ring	22 May	(Germany) #95 Dörr Motorsport	(Switzerland) #1 Hofor Racing by Bonk Motorsport
2	R2	(Austria) Red Bull Ring	22 May	(Germany) Simon Connor Primm (Germany) Nico Hantke	(Italy) Gabriele Piana (Germany) Michael Schrey
3	R1	(Netherlands) Circuit Zandvoort	25 June	(Germany) #24 PROsport Racing	(Germany) #24 PROsport Racing
3	R1	(Netherlands) Circuit Zandvoort	25 June	(Germany) Mike David Ortmann (Germany) Hugo Sasse	(Germany) Mike David Ortmann (Germany) Hugo Sasse
3	R2	(Netherlands) Circuit Zandvoort	26 June	(Germany) #24 PROsport Racing	(Germany) #24 PROsport Racing
3	R2	(Netherlands) Circuit Zandvoort	26 June	(Germany) Mike David Ortmann (Germany) Hugo Sasse	(Germany) Mike David Ortmann (Germany) Hugo Sasse
4	R1	(Germany) Nürburgring	6 August	(Germany) #12 Piro Sports - Burg Zelem Foundation	(Germany) #12 Piro Sports - Burg Zelem Foundation
4	R1	(Germany) Nürburgring	6 August	(Germany) Marcel Lenerz (Germany) Cedric Piro	(Germany) Marcel Lenerz (Germany) Cedric Piro
4	R2	(Germany) Nürburgring	7 August	(Germany) #69 Dörr Motorsport	(Germany) #18 Schnitzelalm Racing
4	R2	(Germany) Nürburgring	7 August	(Germany) Phil Dörr (Netherlands) Indy Dontje	(Germany) Marek Böckmann (Germany) Marcel Marchewicz
5	R1	(Germany) Sachsenring	24 September	(Germany) #24 PROsport Racing	(Germany) #24 PROsport Racing
5	R1	(Germany) Sachsenring	24 September	(Germany) Mike David Ortmann (Germany) Hugo Sasse	(Germany) Mike David Ortmann (Germany) Hugo Sasse
5	R2	(Germany) Sachsenring	25 September	(Germany) #69 Dörr Motorsport	(Germany) #24 PROsport Racing
5	R2	(Germany) Sachsenring	25 September	(Germany) Phil Dörr (Netherlands) Indy Dontje	(Germany) Mike David Ortmann (Germany) Hugo Sasse
6	R1	(Germany) Hockenheimring	22 October	(Germany) #24 PROsport Racing	(Germany) #22 Allied-Racing
6	R1	(Germany) Hockenheimring	22 October	(Germany) Mike David Ortmann (Germany) Hugo Sasse	(Germany) Vincent Andronaco (Austria) Leo Pichler
6	R2	(Germany) Hockenheimring	23 October	(Germany) #24 PROsport Racing	(Germany) #31 AVIA W&S Motorsport
6	R2	(Germany) Hockenheimring	23 October	(Germany) Mike David Ortmann (Germany) Hugo Sasse	(Germany) Lukas Schreier (Germany) Finn Zulauf

== Championship standings ==
=== Points system ===
Points were awarded to the top 10 classified finishers (excluding guest drivers) in each race. No points were awarded for pole position or fastest lap.

Position	1st	2nd	3rd	4th	5th	6th	7th	8th	9th	10th	11th	12th	13th	14th	15th
Points	25	20	16	13	11	10	9	8	7	6	5	4	3	2	1

=== Drivers' standings ===
Pos	Driver	OSC (Germany)		RBR (Austria)		ZAN (Netherlands)		NÜR (Germany)		SAC (Germany)		HOC (Germany)		Pts
1	(Germany) Hugo Sasse	5	4	10	Ret	1	1	4	5	1	1	5	2	185
1	(Germany) Mike David Ortmann	5	4	10	Ret	1	1	4	5	1	1	5	2	185
2	(France) Romain Leroux	2	DSQ	2	Ret	2	2	5	6	4	2	9	4	154
2	(Germany) Ben Dörr	2	DSQ	2	Ret	2	2	5	6	4	2	9	4	154
3	(Netherlands) Indy Dontje	1	3	7	2	12	5	Ret	2	6	3	7	Ret	140
3	(Germany) Phil Dörr	1	3	7	2	12	5	Ret	2	6	3	7	Ret	140
4	(Italy) Gabriele Piana	Ret	5	1	1	11	10	10	Ret	8	10	2	7	121
4	(Germany) Michael Schrey	Ret	5	1	1	11	10	10	Ret	8	10	2	7	121
5	(Germany) Finn Zulauf	4	Ret	5	17	5	Ret	3	8	5	8	3	1	119
6	(Germany) Julian Hanses	Ret	14	4	Ret	3	3	7	4	2	11	13	14	100
7	(Germany) Cedric Piro	3	9	9	16	6	9	1	3	7	Ret	15	18	99
7	(Germany) Marcel Lenerz	3	9	9	16	6	9	1	3	7	Ret	15	18	99
8	(United Kingdom) Tom Wood	11	2	Ret	3	23	8	17	13	12	9	10	3	86
9	(Germany) Jan Philipp Springob	Ret	17	11	9	7	7	6	Ret	3	6	6	10	82
10	(Germany) Max Kronberg	10	6	12	19*	4	11	12	27*	10	7	4	5	81
10	(Germany) Hendrik Still	10	6	12	19*	4	11	12	27*	10	7	4	5	81
11	(Denmark) Nicolaj Møller Madsen	4	Ret	5	17	5	Ret	3	8	5	8			78
12	(Germany) Marek Böckmann	20	8	3	Ret			2	1	18	15			71
13	(Germany) Robin Falkenbach	7	12	Ret	18*			6	Ret	3	6	6	10	65
14	(United Kingdom) Euan McKay	11	2	Ret	3	23	8	17	13	12	9			64
15	(Germany) Theo Oeverhaus	Ret	14			3	3	7	4			13	14	62
16	(Denmark) Alexander Hartvig	13	7	6	5	8	6	Ret	11	22	19	11	19	61
16	(Germany) Moritz Wiskirchen	13	7	6	5	8	6	Ret	11	22	19	11	19	61
17	(Germany) Marcel Marchewicz	7	12	Ret	18*			2	1	18	15			60
18	(Bulgaria) Stefan Bostandjiev	14	19	19	6	9	16	11	28*	9	5	8	6	60
18	(Bulgaria) Pavel Lefterov	14	19	19	6	9	16	11	28*	9	5	8	6	60
19	(Germany) Vincent Andronaco	23	1	Ret	Ret	10	22	Ret	Ret	25	Ret	1	DNS	56
20	(United Kingdom) Will Tregurtha									2	11	10	3	47
21	(United States) Robert Haub	6	22	Ret	15	22	4	8	7	Ret	12	16	22	46
22	(Germany) Simon Connor Primm	8	11	15	Ret	13	12	15	14	14	4	12	Ret	44
22	(Germany) Nico Hantke	8	11	15	Ret	13	12	15	14	14	4	12	Ret	44
23	(Czech Republic) Gabriela Jílková	6	22	Ret	15	22	4	8	7					42
24	(Germany) Lukas Schreier											3	1	41
25	(Austria) Leo Pichler	25	Ret	20	Ret	10	22	Ret	Ret	25	Ret	1	DNS	31
26	(Germany) Ferdinand Winter	9	23	14	7	18	Ret	9	10	20	20	Ret	20	31
27	(Austria) Nico Gruber	Ret	17	11	9	7	7			20	20	Ret	20	30
28	(Germany) Paul-Aurel König	23	1	Ret	Ret	14	15	Ret	22					28
29	(Germany) Patrick Steinmetz	18	15	13	4	17	13	24	23	19	22	17	8	28
29	(Germany) Michael von Zabiensky	18	15	13	4	17	13	24	23	19	22	17	8	28
30	(Germany) Tim Reiter	17	13	8	Ret	19	Ret	13	12	13	Ret	19	9	28
30	(Germany) Max Rosam	17	13	8	Ret	19	Ret	13	12	13	Ret	19	9	28
31	(Switzerland) Miklas Born	20	8	3	Ret									24
32	(Luxembourg) Christian Kosch	12	10	Ret	10	21	14	21	20	16	16	18	15	21
32	(Luxembourg) Tom Kieffer	12	10	Ret	10	21	14	21	20	16	16	18	15	21
33	(Germany) Ricardo Dort	9	23	14	7	18	Ret							18
34	(France) Théo Nouet			4	Ret					Ret	12	16	22	17
35	(Switzerland) Lucas Mauron							9	10					13
36	(Germany) Lukas Mayer	16	Ret	16	14	16	17	25	9	21	23	21	Ret	10
36	(Germany) Denis Bulatov	16	Ret	16	14	16	17	25	9	21	23	21	Ret	10
37	(Germany) Joachim Bölting	19	18	18	8	24	Ret	20	18	Ret	Ret	24	16	9
37	(Bulgaria) Tano Neumann	19	18	18	8	24	Ret	20	18	Ret	Ret	24	16	9
38	(Czech Republic) Erik Janiš											14	11	7
38	(Germany) Lennart Marioneck											14	11	7
39	(Czech Republic) Josef Knopp	22	16	17	13	26*	20	Ret	16	Ret	13	20	17	7
40	(Germany) Juliano Holzem	21	Ret	Ret	Ret	15	22*	23	21	15	18	Ret	12	6
40	(Germany) Sandro Holzem	21	Ret	Ret	Ret	15	22*	23	21	15	18	Ret	12	6
41	(Germany) Dominik Fugel									11	21			5
41	(Germany) Tim Neuser									11	21			5
41	(Ukraine) Yevgen Sokolovskiy	24	20	21	11	25	19	22	24	24	Ret	23	23	5
41	(Germany) Christopher Röhner	24	20	21	11	25	19	22	24	24	Ret			5
42	(Czech Republic) Matěj Pavlíček	22	16	17	13	26*	20	Ret	16					4
43	(Austria) Reinhard Kofler									Ret	13			3
44	(Switzerland) Konstantin Lachenauer					14	15	Ret	22					3
45	(Germany) Roland Froese							19	15					1
45	(Germany) Yves Volte							19	15					1
45	(Germany) Daniel Schwerfeld	15	21	22	Ret	Ret	21	18	26					1
45	(Germany) Axel Sartingen	15	21	22	Ret	Ret	21	18	26					1
46	(Germany) Leon Wassertheurer	25	Ret	20	Ret			14	19	17	14	26	13	0
46	(Germany) Jacob Riegel					20	18							0
46	(Spain) Marc de Fulgencio					20	18							0
46	(Germany) Ruben Zeltner									23	17			0
46	(Germany) Ralf Grösel									23	17			0
46	(Ukraine) Ivan Peklin											23	23	0
Guest drivers ineligible to score points
–	(Austria) Daniel Drexel			23	12									–
–	(Austria) Horst Felix Felbermayr			23	12									–
–	(Germany) Donar Munding							14	19	17	14	26	13	–
–	(Germany) Philipp Gogollok							16	17			20	17	–
–	(United States) Phillippe Denes							16	17					–
–	(Bulgaria) Aleks Stefanov							Ret	25	Ret		21	Ret	–
–	(Germany) André Bruckmann							Ret	25			21	Ret	–
–	(Israel) Alon Gabbay									Ret				–
–	(Germany) Ralf Bohn											25	21	–
–	(Germany) Alfred Renauer											25	21	–
Pos	Driver	OSC (Germany)		RBR (Austria)		ZAN (Netherlands)		NÜR (Germany)		SAC (Germany)		HOC (Germany)		Pts

== See also ==
- 2022 GT4 European Series
- 2022 ADAC GT Masters
