= 2023 ADAC GT4 Germany =

Motorsport season

The 2023 ADAC GT4 Germany season was the fifth season of ADAC GT4 Germany, a sports car championship created and organised by the ADAC. The season started on 27 May at Oschersleben and finished on 22 October at the Hockenheimring.

Mike David Ortmann and Hugo Sasse became the first drivers to win multiple ADAC GT4 Germany titles and first to successfully defend an ADAC GT4 Germany title, scoring four race wins and wrapping up the championship at the penultimate race of the season.

== Calendar ==
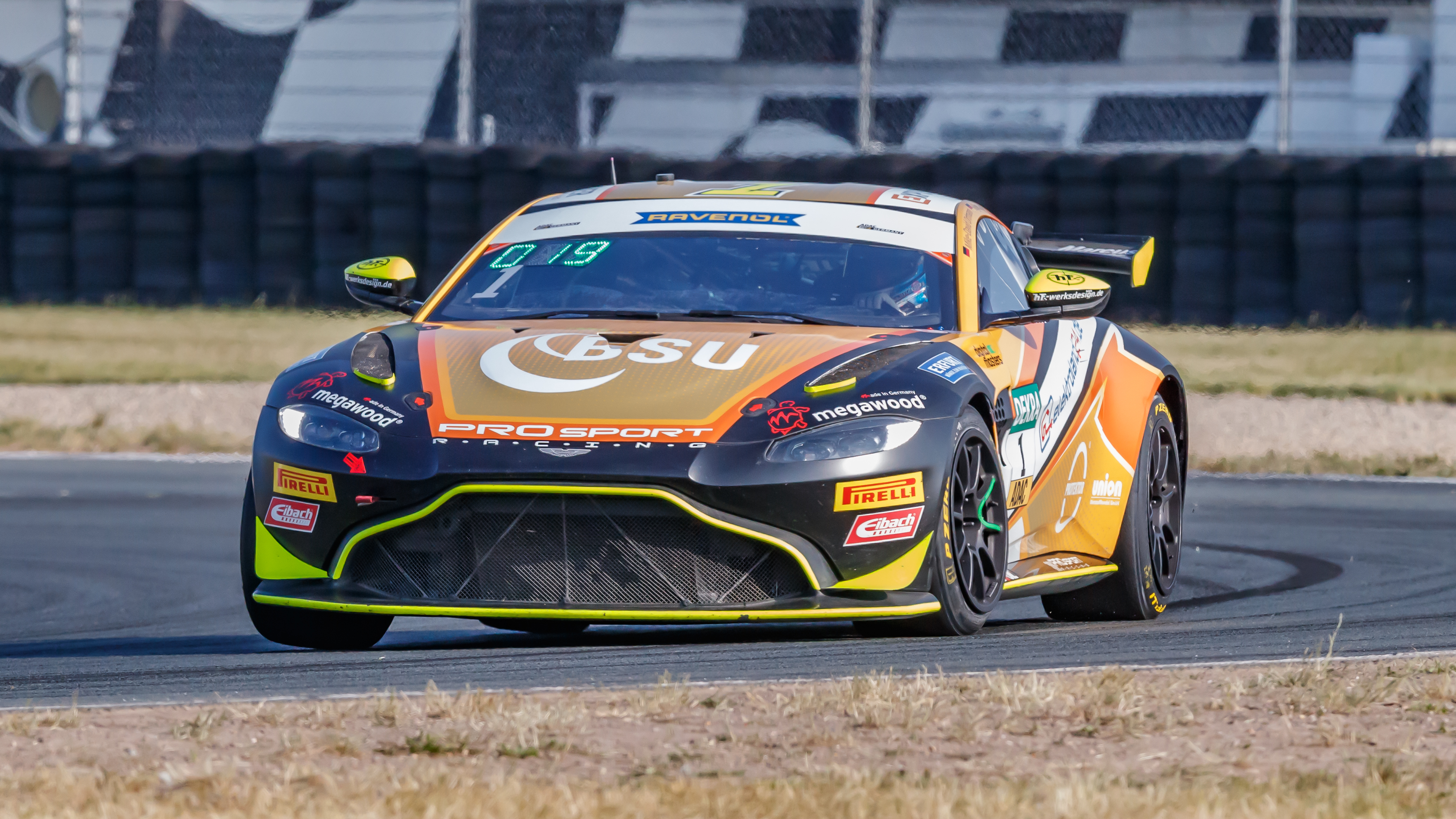
The championship-winning car of Mike David Ortmann and Hugo Sasse.

Round	Circuit	Date
1	Motorsport Arena Oschersleben, Oschersleben, Germany	27–28 May
2	Circuit Zandvoort, Zandvoort, Netherlands	24–25 June
3	Nürburgring, Nürburg, Germany	5–6 August
4	Lausitzring, Klettwitz, Germany	19–20 August
5	Sachsenring, Hohenstein-Ernstthal, Germany	9–10 September
6	Hockenheimring, Hockenheim, Germany	21–22 October

== Entry list ==
Team	Car	No.	Drivers	Class	Rounds
(Germany) Dörr Motorsport	Aston Martin Vantage AMR GT4	007	(Germany) Ben Dörr	J	1–3
(Germany) Dörr Motorsport	Aston Martin Vantage AMR GT4	007	(France) Théo Nouet		1–3
(Germany) PROsport Racing	Aston Martin Vantage AMR GT4	1	(Germany) Mike David Ortmann		All
(Germany) PROsport Racing	Aston Martin Vantage AMR GT4	1	(Germany) Hugo Sasse		All
(Germany) PROsport Racing	Aston Martin Vantage AMR GT4	13	(France) Célia Martin		All
(Germany) PROsport Racing	Aston Martin Vantage AMR GT4	13	(Liechtenstein) Fabienne Wohlwend		All
(Germany) PROsport Racing	Aston Martin Vantage AMR GT4	19	(Sweden) Andreas Bäckman		1
(Germany) PROsport Racing	Aston Martin Vantage AMR GT4	19	(Sweden) Jessica Bäckman		1
(Germany) PROsport Racing	Aston Martin Vantage AMR GT4	19	(Netherlands) Ricardo van der Ende		2
(Germany) PROsport Racing	Aston Martin Vantage AMR GT4	19	(Belgium) Benjamin Lessennes		2
(Germany) PROsport Racing	Aston Martin Vantage AMR GT4	19	(Austria) Raphael Rennhofer	J	3–6
(Germany) PROsport Racing	Aston Martin Vantage AMR GT4	19	(Germany) Leon Erger		3–5
(Germany) PROsport Racing	Aston Martin Vantage AMR GT4	19	(Germany) Marek Böckmann		6
(Germany) PROsport Racing	Aston Martin Vantage AMR GT4	48	(Ukraine) Yevgen Sokolovskiy	T	All
(Germany) PROsport Racing	Aston Martin Vantage AMR GT4	48	(Canada) Damon Surzyshyn	T	All
(Switzerland) Hofor Racing by Bonk Motorsport	BMW M4 GT4	2	Marat Khayrov	T	All
(Switzerland) Hofor Racing by Bonk Motorsport	BMW M4 GT4	2	(Italy) Gabriele Piana		All
(Switzerland) Hofor Racing by Bonk Motorsport	BMW M4 GT4	3	(Finland) Matias Nuoramo	J	1, 3–4, 6
(Switzerland) Hofor Racing by Bonk Motorsport	BMW M4 GT4	3	(Finland) Nikolas Pirttilahti	J	1, 3–4, 6
(Switzerland) Hofor Racing by Bonk Motorsport	BMW M4 GT4	5	(Germany) Tim Reiter		All
(Switzerland) Hofor Racing by Bonk Motorsport	BMW M4 GT4	5	(Germany) Leon Wassertheurer		All
(Germany) BCMC Motorsport powered by EastSide Motorsport	Mercedes-AMG GT4	4	Denis Bulatov		All
(Germany) BCMC Motorsport powered by EastSide Motorsport	Mercedes-AMG GT4	4	(Germany) Marcel Lenerz		1–3
(Germany) BCMC Motorsport powered by EastSide Motorsport	Mercedes-AMG GT4	4	(Spain) Marc de Fulgencio		4–6
(Germany) EastSide Motorsport	Mercedes-AMG GT4	20	(Germany) Philipp Gogollok	J	All
(Germany) EastSide Motorsport	Mercedes-AMG GT4	20	(Germany) Dominique Schaak		All
(Germany) EastSide Motorsport	Mercedes-AMG GT4	21	(Germany) Ralf Grösel	G	3
(Germany) EastSide Motorsport	Mercedes-AMG GT4	21	(Germany) Lukas Mayer	G	3
(Austria) Wimmer Werk Motorsport	Porsche 718 Cayman GT4 Clubsport	6	(Denmark) Nicolaj Møller Madsen		All
(Austria) Wimmer Werk Motorsport	Porsche 718 Cayman GT4 Clubsport	6	(Italy) Eric Scalvini		1
(Austria) Wimmer Werk Motorsport	Porsche 718 Cayman GT4 Clubsport	6	Ivan Ekelchik		2–6
(Austria) Wimmer Werk Motorsport	Porsche 718 Cayman GT4 Clubsport	24	(Austria) Max Wimmer		2–6
(Austria) Wimmer Werk Motorsport	Porsche 718 Cayman GT4 Clubsport	24	(Italy) Eric Scalvini		2, 4–6
(Austria) Wimmer Werk Motorsport	Porsche 718 Cayman GT4 Clubsport	24	(Austria) Leo Pichler		3
(Germany) BWT Mücke Motorsport	Mercedes-AMG GT4	8	(Mozambique) Rodrigo Almeida	J	All
(Germany) BWT Mücke Motorsport	Mercedes-AMG GT4	8	(Czech Republic) Josef Knopp	J	All
(Germany) BWT Mücke Motorsport	Mercedes-AMG GT4	18	(Norway) Emil Gjerdrum	J	All
(Germany) BWT Mücke Motorsport	Mercedes-AMG GT4	18	(United Arab Emirates) Alex Connor	J	1–4
(Germany) BWT Mücke Motorsport	Mercedes-AMG GT4	18	(United Arab Emirates) Lachlan Robinson	J	5–6
(Bulgaria) Overdrive Racing	Porsche 718 Cayman GT4 Clubsport	9	(Germany) Joachim Bölting	T	All
(Bulgaria) Overdrive Racing	Porsche 718 Cayman GT4 Clubsport	9	(Bulgaria) Tano Neumann	T	All
(Bulgaria) Overdrive Racing	Porsche 718 Cayman GT4 Clubsport	23	(Bulgaria) Pavel Lefterov		All
(Bulgaria) Overdrive Racing	Porsche 718 Cayman GT4 Clubsport	23	(Bulgaria) Stefan Bostandjiev	J	All
(Germany) Team Piro Sports Toyota Lambeng	Toyota GR Supra GT4	12	(Germany) Robin Falkenbach		1–4
(Germany) Team Piro Sports Toyota Lambeng	Toyota GR Supra GT4	12	(Germany) Cedric Piro		1–4
(Germany) FK Performance Motorsport	BMW M4 GT4	15	(United Kingdom) Mohan Ritson		All
(Germany) FK Performance Motorsport	BMW M4 GT4	15	(United Kingdom) Tom Wood		All
(Germany) FK Performance Motorsport	BMW M4 GT4	16	(Czech Republic) Michal Makes	G	6
(Germany) FK Performance Motorsport	BMW M4 GT4	16	(Germany) Nick Wüstenhagen	G	6
(Germany) Allied-Racing	Porsche 718 Cayman GT4 Clubsport	22	(Denmark) Alexander Hartvig		All
(Germany) Allied-Racing	Porsche 718 Cayman GT4 Clubsport	22	(Netherlands) Nathan Schaap	J	All
(Germany) Allied-Racing	Porsche 718 Cayman GT4 Clubsport	26	(Luxembourg) Tom Kieffer	T	All
(Germany) Allied-Racing	Porsche 718 Cayman GT4 Clubsport	26	(Luxembourg) Christian Kosch	T	All
(Germany) AVIA W&S Motorsport	Porsche 718 Cayman GT4 Clubsport	30	(Germany) Max Kronberg	T	All
(Germany) AVIA W&S Motorsport	Porsche 718 Cayman GT4 Clubsport	30	(Germany) Hendrik Still		All
(Germany) AVIA W&S Motorsport	Porsche 718 Cayman GT4 Clubsport	31	(Germany) Jannes Fittje		All
(Germany) AVIA W&S Motorsport	Porsche 718 Cayman GT4 Clubsport	31	(Germany) David Jahn		All
(Germany) AVIA W&S Motorsport	Porsche 718 Cayman GT4 Clubsport	32	(Switzerland) Nicolas Leutwiler	G	6
(Germany) AVIA W&S Motorsport	Porsche 718 Cayman GT4 Clubsport	32	(Austria) Leo Pichler	G	6
(Germany) AVIA W&S Motorsport	Porsche 718 Cayman GT4 Clubsport	75	(Germany) Daniel Gregor	J	All
(Germany) AVIA W&S Motorsport	Porsche 718 Cayman GT4 Clubsport	75	(Germany) Finn Zulauf	J	All
(Germany) Walkenhorst Motorsport	BMW M4 GT4	34	(Germany) Nico Hantke	J	All
(Germany) Walkenhorst Motorsport	BMW M4 GT4	34	(Netherlands) Mex Jansen	J	All
(Germany) Walkenhorst Motorsport	BMW M4 GT4	35	(France) Enzo Joulié	J	All
(Germany) Walkenhorst Motorsport	BMW M4 GT4	35	(Finland) Sami-Matti Trogen		All
(Germany) East-Racing Motorsport	BMW M4 GT4	41	(Germany) Steve Kirsch	G	5
(Germany) East-Racing Motorsport	BMW M4 GT4	41	(Germany) Christopher Röhner	G	5
(Germany) Project 1	BMW M4 GT4	54	(Netherlands) Maxime Oosten	J	All
(Germany) Project 1	BMW M4 GT4	54	(Czech Republic) Michal Makes		1–5
(Germany) Project 1	BMW M4 GT4	54	(South Africa) Leyton Fourie	J	6
(Germany) ME-Motorsport	BMW M4 GT4	66	(Germany) Markus Eichele	G	6
(Germany) ME-Motorsport	BMW M4 GT4	66	(Germany) Philip Wiskirchen	G	6
(Germany) CV Performance Group	Mercedes-AMG GT4	83	(Germany) Robin Falkenbach	G	5
(Germany) CV Performance Group	Mercedes-AMG GT4	83	(Germany) Fabio Rauer	G	5
(Germany) CV Performance Group	Mercedes-AMG GT4	84	(Germany) Patrick Steinmetz		1–5
(Germany) CV Performance Group	Mercedes-AMG GT4	84	(Germany) Fabio Rauer		6
(Germany) CV Performance Group	Mercedes-AMG GT4	84	(Germany) Ferdinand Winter	J	All
(Germany) CV Performance Group	Mercedes-AMG GT4	85	(Germany) Simon Connor Primm	J	All
(Germany) CV Performance Group	Mercedes-AMG GT4	85	(Germany) Jan Philipp Springob		All
(Hong Kong) KCMG	Toyota GR Supra GT4 Evo	86	(New Zealand) Brock Gilchrist	G	3
(Hong Kong) KCMG	Toyota GR Supra GT4 Evo	86	(Australia) Rylan Gray	G	3

- Felix Wimmer was scheduled to drive for Wimmer Werk Motorsport but did not appear in any rounds.
- Gabriela Jílková was scheduled to drive for PROsport Racing, but withdrew prior to the start of the season.
- Sandro Holzem was scheduled to drive for Project 1 but opted to compete in selected rounds of the ADAC GT Masters and Deutsche Tourenwagen Masters instead.

== Results ==
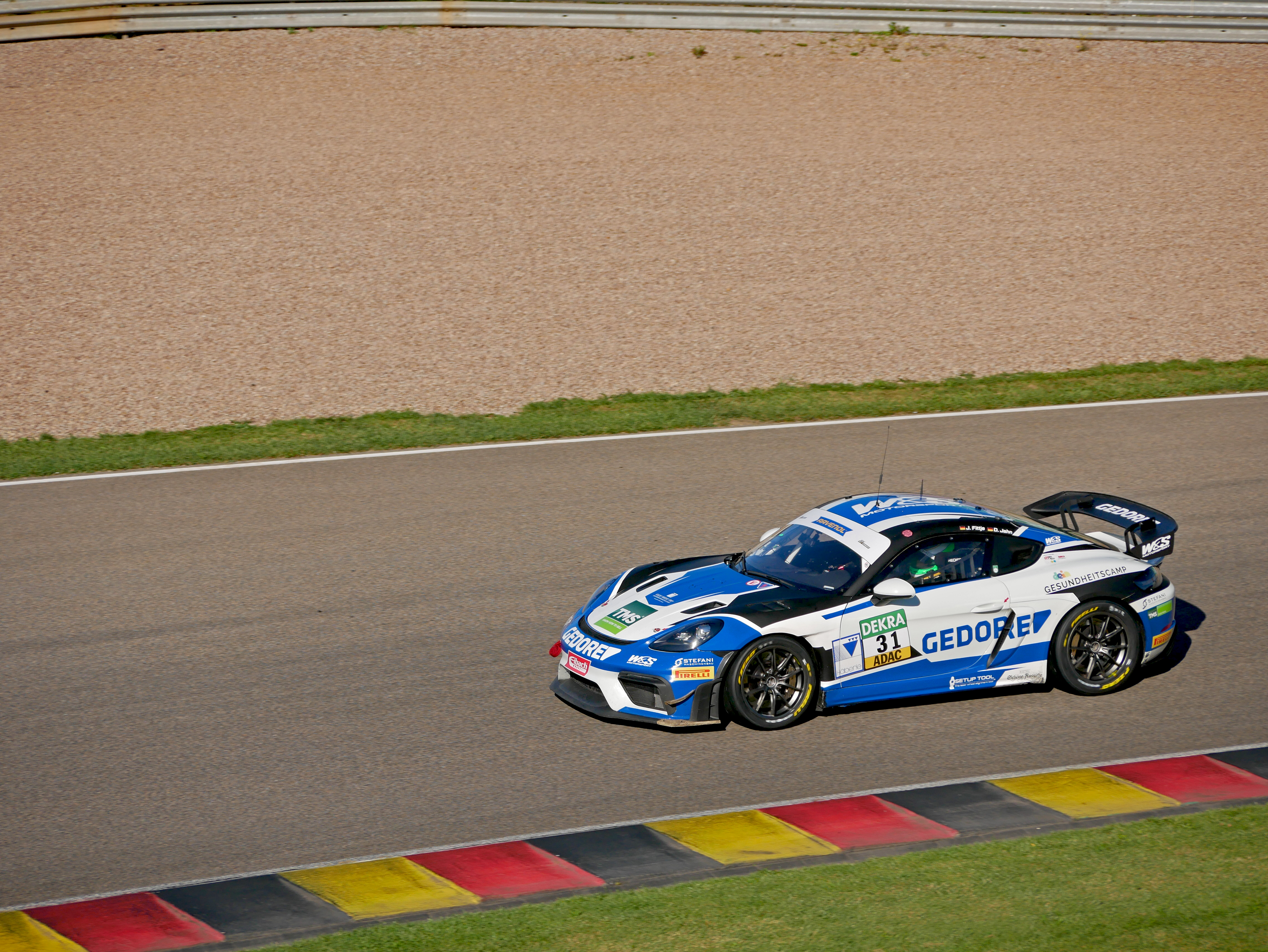
Jannes Fittje and David Jahn scored two wins and three pole positions.

Round		Circuit	Date	Pole position	Race winner
1	R1	(Germany) Motorsport Arena Oschersleben	27 May	(Germany) #4 EastSide Motorsport	(Germany) #85 CV Performance Group
1	R1	(Germany) Motorsport Arena Oschersleben	27 May	Denis Bulatov	(Germany) Simon Connor Primm (Germany) Jan Philipp Springob
1	R2	(Germany) Motorsport Arena Oschersleben	28 May	(Switzerland) #2 Hofor Racing	(Germany) #1 PROsport Racing
1	R2	(Germany) Motorsport Arena Oschersleben	28 May	(Italy) Gabriele Piana	(Germany) Mike David Ortmann (Germany) Hugo Sasse
2	R1	(Netherlands) Circuit Zandvoort	24 June	(Germany) #31 W&S Motorsport	(Germany) #31 W&S Motorsport
2	R1	(Netherlands) Circuit Zandvoort	24 June	(Germany) David Jahn	(Germany) David Jahn (Germany) Jannes Fittje
2	R2	(Netherlands) Circuit Zandvoort	25 June	(Germany) #4 EastSide Motorsport	(Germany) #4 EastSide Motorsport
2	R2	(Netherlands) Circuit Zandvoort	25 June	Denis Bulatov	(Germany) Marcel Lenerz; Denis Bulatov
3	R1	(Germany) Nürburgring	5 August	(Germany) #1 PROsport Racing	(Germany) #85 CV Performance Group
3	R1	(Germany) Nürburgring	5 August	(Germany) Hugo Sasse	(Germany) Jan Philipp Springob (Germany) Simon Connor Primm
3	R2	(Germany) Nürburgring	6 August	(Austria) #24 Wimmer Werk Motorsport	(Germany) #1 PROsport Racing
3	R2	(Germany) Nürburgring	6 August	(Austria) Leo Pichler	(Germany) Mike David Ortmann (Germany) Hugo Sasse
4	R1	(Germany) Lausitzring	19 August	(Austria) #6 Wimmer Werk Motorsport	(Germany) #75 W&S Motorsport
4	R1	(Germany) Lausitzring	19 August	(Denmark) Nicolaj Møller Madsen	(Germany) Daniel Gregor (Germany) Finn Zulauf
4	R2	(Germany) Lausitzring	20 August	(Germany) #75 W&S Motorsport	(Germany) #4 EastSide Motorsport
4	R2	(Germany) Lausitzring	20 August	(Germany) Finn Zulauf	Denis Bulatov (Spain) Marc de Fulgencio
5	R1	(Germany) Sachsenring	9 September	(Germany) #31 W&S Motorsport	(Germany) #1 PROsport Racing
5	R1	(Germany) Sachsenring	9 September	(Germany) David Jahn	(Germany) Mike David Ortmann (Germany) Hugo Sasse
5	R2	(Germany) Sachsenring	10 September	(Germany) #31 W&S Motorsport	(Germany) #1 PROsport Racing
5	R2	(Germany) Sachsenring	10 September	(Germany) Jannes Fittje	(Germany) Mike David Ortmann (Germany) Hugo Sasse
6	R1	(Germany) Hockenheimring	21 October	(Germany) #1 PROsport Racing	(Germany) #31 W&S Motorsport
6	R1	(Germany) Hockenheimring	21 October	(Germany) Hugo Sasse	(Germany) David Jahn (Germany) Jannes Fittje
6	R2	(Germany) Hockenheimring	22 October	(Germany) #30 W&S Motorsport	(Germany) #30 W&S Motorsport
6	R2	(Germany) Hockenheimring	22 October	(Germany) Hendrik Still	(Germany) Max Kronberg (Germany) Herndik Still

== Championship standings ==
Position	1st	2nd	3rd	4th	5th	6th	7th	8th	9th	10th	11th	12th	13th	14th	15th
Points	25	20	16	13	11	10	9	8	7	6	5	4	3	2	1

Drivers' championship

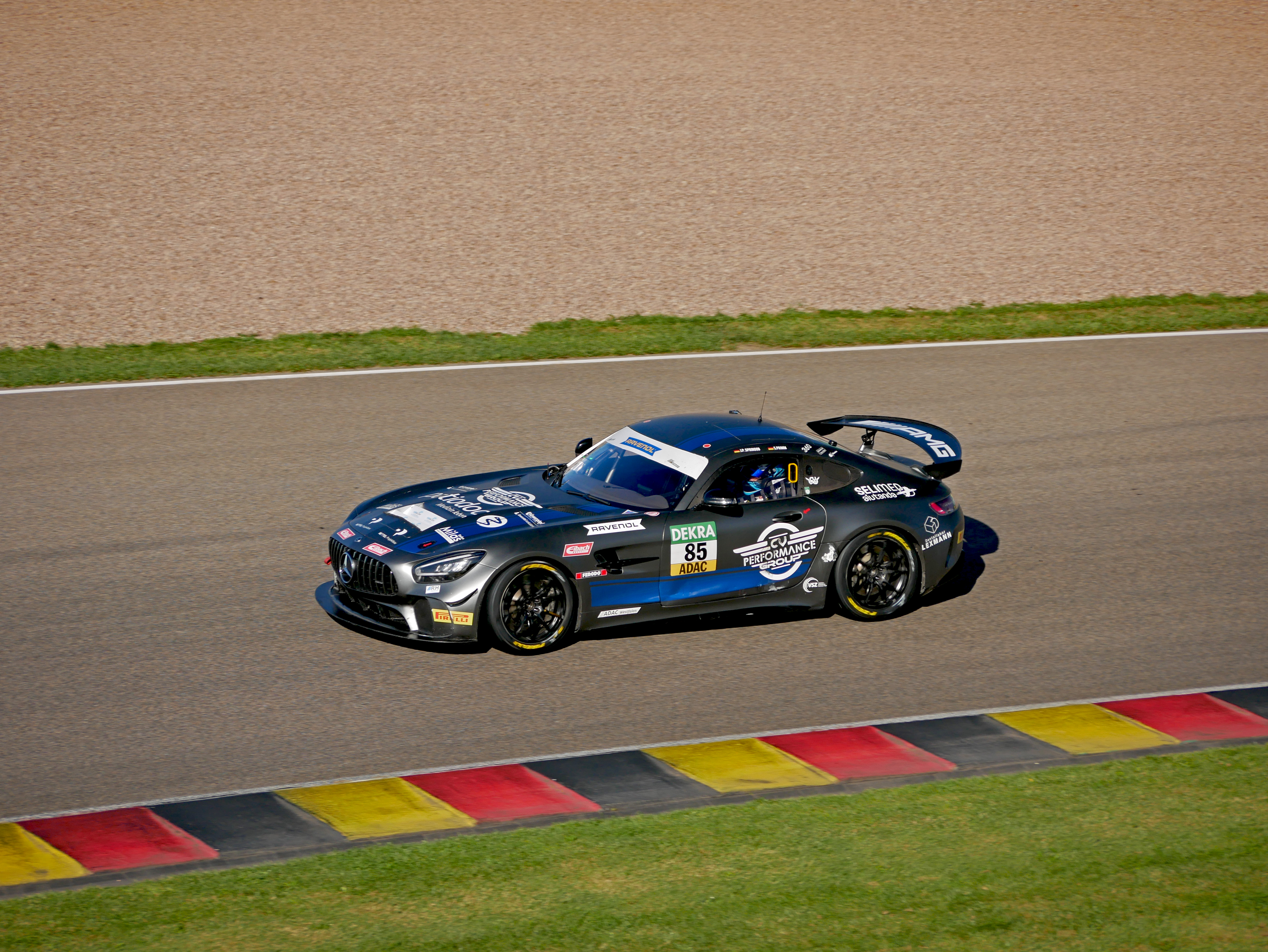
Simon Connor Primm was crowned Junior Class champion.

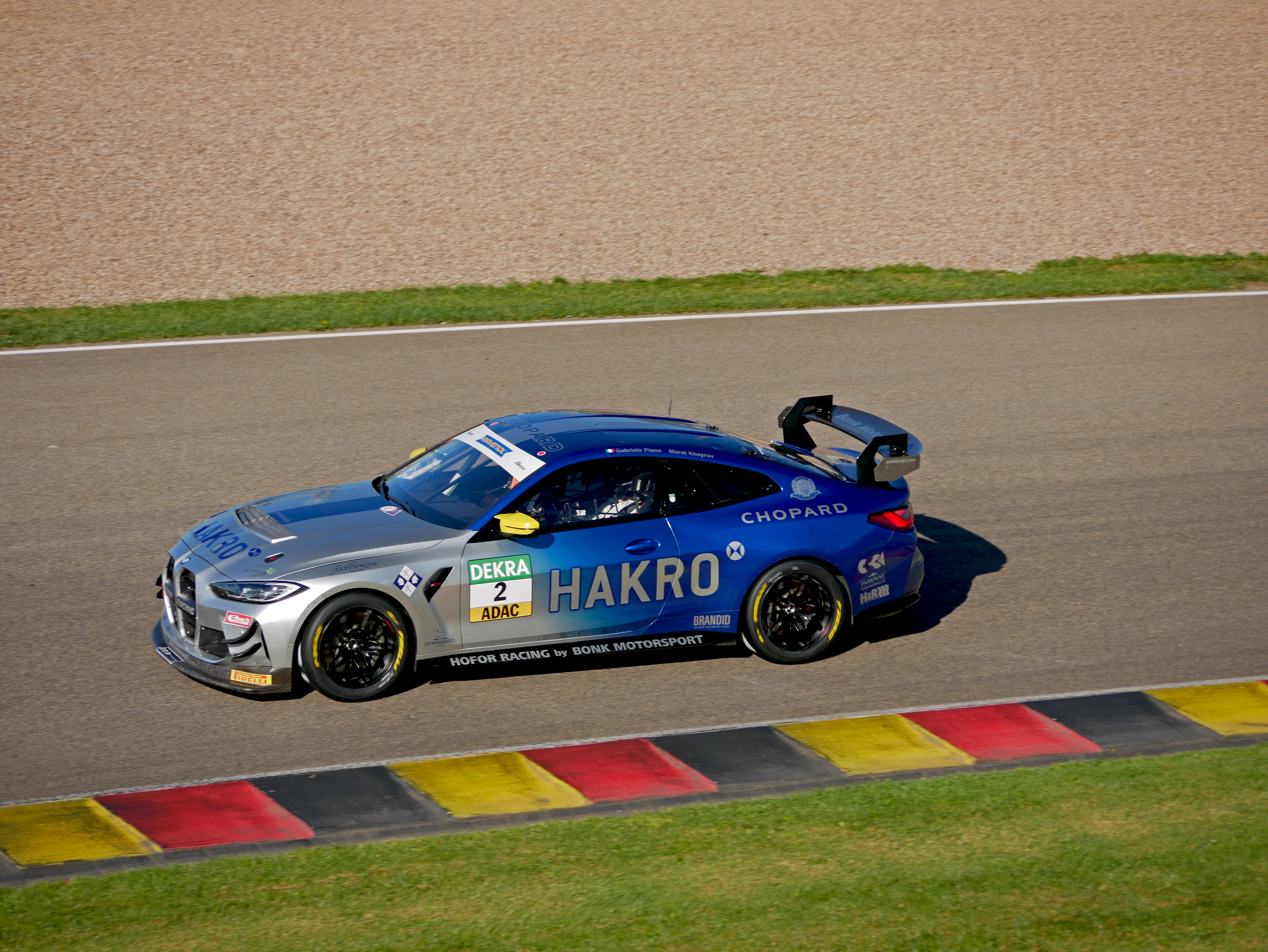
Marat Khayrov was crowned Trophy Class champion.

Pos.	Driver	OSC (Germany)		ZAN (Netherlands)		NÜR (Germany)		LAU (Germany)		SAC (Germany)		HOC (Germany)		Points
Pos.	Driver	R1	R2	R1	R2	R1	R2	R1	R2	R1	R2	R1	R2	Points
1	(Germany) Hugo Sasse (Germany) Mike David Ortmann	DNF	1	4	5	2	1	4	3	1	1	6	3	199
2	Denis Bulatov	4	9	2	1	4	12	6	1	12	8	2	7	159
3	(Germany) David Jahn (Germany) Jannes Fittje	5	6	1	3	17	8	13	2	2	DNF	1	6	148
4	(Germany) Simon Connor Primm (Germany) Jan Philipp Springob	1	7	13	9	1	3	8	6	15	4	4	DNS	130
5	(Germany) Nico Hantke (Netherlands) Mex Jansen	3	3	5	2	21	DNF	3	DNF	25	2	7	9	116
6	Marat Khayrov (Italy) Gabriele Piana	19	4	7	7	11	17	10	7	4	6	10	2	100
7	(Germany) Finn Zulauf (Germany) Daniel Gregor	8	13	3	10	12	2	1	DNF	23	20	DNF	4	95
8	(Germany) Max Kronberg (Germany) Hendrik Still	14	12	20	11	DNF	6	20	10	7	7	3	1	86
9	(Germany) Marcel Lenerz	4	9	2	1	4	12							83
10	(Germany) Leon Wassertheurer (Germany) Tim Reiter	9	11	6	4	25	16	11	11	3	23	9	5	80
11	(Spain) Marc de Fulgencio							6	1	12	8	2	7	76
12	(Finland) Sami-Matti Trogen (France) Enzo Joulié	2	5	23	DNF	14	19	9	5	24	5	14	15	66
13	(United Kingdom) Tom Wood (United Kingdom) Mohan Ritson	7	8	9	8	13	22	15	8	9	3	25	18	66
14	(Denmark) Nicolaj Møller Madsen	17	17	24	23	5	4	5	21	6	9	5	DNF	63
14	Ivan Ekelchik			24	23	5	4	5	21	6	9	5	DNF	63
15	(Czech Republic) Michael Makes (Note: Makes competed in a guest entry in Round 6 and was therefore ineligible for points at that round.)	10	2	DNF	22	26	24	2	9	DNF	24	18	21	53
15	(Netherlands) Maxime Oosten	10	2	DNF	22	26	24	2	9	DNF	24	DSQ	DNF	53
16	(Czech Republic) Josef Knopp (Mozambique) Rodrigo Almeida	13	18	8	12	DNF	14	7	12	8	10	15	26	47
17	(Netherlands) Nathan Schaap (Denmark) Alexander Hartvig	11	10	DNF	DNF	15	13	12	DNF	5	DNF	21	13	34
18	(Germany) Ferdinand Winter	18	15	14	17	6	11	DNF	16	10	14	12	20	32
19	(Norway) Emil Gjerdrum	6	16	11	14	DNF	DNF	16	4	19	17	23	25	30
19	(United Arab Emirates) Alex Connor	6	16	11	14	DNF	DNF	16	4					30
20	(Austria) Raphael Rennhofer					7	18	14	DNF	11	16	8	12	30
21	(Bulgaria) Pavel Lefterov (Bulgaria) Stefan Bostandjiev	12	14	22	DNF	9	9	DNF	DNF	DNF	13	24	10	30
22	(Germany) Ben Dörr (France) Théo Nouet	15	DNS	17	13	3	7							29
23	(Germany) Patrick Steinmetz	18	15	14	17	6	11	DNF	16	10	14			27
24	(Austria) Max Wimmer			19	15	18	5	DNF	14	14	11	DNF	17	25
25	(Germany) Philipp Gogollok (Germany) Dominique Schaak	20	20	12	16	8	15	21	13	21	DNF	13	23	21
26	(Germany) Leon Erger					7	18	14	DNF	11	16			17
27	(Belgium) Benjamin Lessennes (Netherlands) Ricardo van der Ende			10	6									16
28	(Austria) Leo Pichler (Note: Pichler competed in a guest entry in Round 6 and was therefore ineligible for points at that round.)					18	5					16	16	14
29	(Germany) Marek Böckmann											8	12	13
30	(Italy) Eric Scalvini	17	17	19	15			DNF	14	14	11	DNF	17	11
31	(Luxembourg) Tom Kieffer (Luxembourg) Christian Kosch	DNF	19	16	19	16	20	19	15	13	22	20	11	10
32	(Ukraine) Yevgen Sokolovskiy (Canada) Damon Surzyshyn	DNF	24	21	24	10	25	18	DNF	22	19	22	24	6
33	(Germany) Fabio Rauer (Note: Rauer competed in a guest entry in Round 5 and was therefore ineligible for points at that round.)									16	21	12	20	5
34	(France) Célia Martin (Liechtenstein) Fabienne Wohlwend	21	23	18	21	23	DNF	22	19	18	12	19	22	4
35	(Finland) Matias Nuoramo (Finland) Nikolas Pirttilahti	23	21			22	23	17	17			17	14	4
36	(Germany) Robin Falkenbach (Note: Falkenbach competed in a guest entry in Round 5, and was therefore ineligible for points at that rounds.)	16	25	15	18	24	21	DNF	18	16	21			1
36	(Germany) Cedric Piro	16	25	15	18	24	21	DNF	18					1
NC	(United Arab Emirates) Lachlan Robinson									19	17	23	25	0
NC	(Germany) Joachim Bölting (Bulgaria) Tano Neumann	22	22	DNF	20	19	26	DNF	20	20	18	DNF	19	0
NC	(Sweden) Andreas Bäckman (Sweden) Jessica Bäckman	24	DNF											0
NC	(South Africa) Leyton Fourie											DSQ	DNF	0
Guest entries ineligible for championship points
	(Germany) Markus Eichele (Germany) Philipp Wiskirchen											11	8	
	(New Zealand) Brock Gilchrist (Australia) Rylan Gray					20	10							
	(Germany) Steve Kirsch (Germany) Christopher Röhner									17	15			
	(Switzerland) Nicolas Leutwiler											16	16	
	(Germany) Nicholas Wüstenhagen											18	21	
	(Germany) Ralf Grösel (Germany) Lukas Mayer					WD								
