= 2026 Prototype Winter Series =

Sports car racing tournament season

- Organizer: Gedlich Racing
- Discipline: Sports car racing
- Number of races: 5

Champions
- Prototype Winter Series - Driver: (Denmark) Tobias Bille Clausen (Denmark) Mads Kjelde Larsen
- Prototype Winter Series - Team: (Germany) BWT Mücke Motorsport

Prototype Winter Series
- ← 2025 2027 →

2026 Prototype Winter Series was the third season of the Prototype Winter Series, sports car racing series organized by Gedlich Racing and licensed by Automobile Club de l'Ouest (ACO).

== Race calendar ==
Round		Circuit	Date	Supporting	Map of circuit locations
1	R1	(Spain) MotorLand Aragón, Alcañiz	5–8 March	Formula Winter Series; GT Winter Series; GT4 Winter Series	2026 Prototype Winter Series is located in Iberia
1	R2	(Spain) MotorLand Aragón, Alcañiz	5–8 March	Formula Winter Series; GT Winter Series; GT4 Winter Series	2026 Prototype Winter Series is located in Iberia
2	R1	(Spain) Circuit de Barcelona-Catalunya, Montmeló	12–15 March	Formula Winter Series; GT Winter Series; GT4 Winter Series	2026 Prototype Winter Series is located in Iberia
2	R2	(Spain) Circuit de Barcelona-Catalunya, Montmeló	12–15 March	Formula Winter Series; GT Winter Series; GT4 Winter Series	2026 Prototype Winter Series is located in Iberia
2	R3	(Spain) Circuit de Barcelona-Catalunya, Montmeló	12–15 March	Formula Winter Series; GT Winter Series; GT4 Winter Series	2026 Prototype Winter Series is located in Iberia

- The second round at Circuit de Barcelona-Catalunya was run with the GT Winter Series.

== Series news ==
After previously allowing second-generation LMP3 cars, 2026 is the first season to involve solely the third-generation cars. Eligible cars are: ADESS AD25, Duqueine D09, Ginetta G61-LT-P3 Evo and Ligier JS P325.

== Entry list ==
Team	Chassis	No.	Drivers	Rounds
(Germany) BWT Mücke Motorsport	Duqueine D09	8	(Denmark) Tobias Bille Clausen	All
(Germany) BWT Mücke Motorsport	Duqueine D09	8	(Denmark) Mads Kjelde Larsen	All
(Sweden) Allay Racing	Ligier JS P325	43	(Sweden) Linus Hellberg	1
(Sweden) Allay Racing	Ligier JS P325	48	(Sweden) Emil Hellberg	1
(Denmark) High Class Racing	Ligier JS P325	49	(Denmark) Michael Hove	All
(Denmark) High Class Racing	Ligier JS P325	49	(South Africa) Andrew Rackstraw	All

== Race results ==
Round		Circuit	Pole position	Race winners
1	R1	(Spain) MotorLand Aragón	(Germany) No. 8 BWT Mücke Motorsport	(Sweden) No. 43 Allay Racing
1	R1	(Spain) MotorLand Aragón	(Denmark) Tobias Bille Clausen (Denmark) Mads Kjelde Larsen	(Sweden) Linus Hellberg
1	R2	(Spain) MotorLand Aragón	(Sweden) No. 48 Allay Racing	(Sweden) No. 48 Allay Racing
1	R2	(Spain) MotorLand Aragón	(Sweden) Emil Hellberg	(Sweden) Emil Hellberg
2	R1	(Spain) Circuit de Barcelona-Catalunya	(Germany) No. 8 BWT Mücke Motorsport	(Germany) No. 8 BWT Mücke Motorsport
2	R1	(Spain) Circuit de Barcelona-Catalunya	(Denmark) Tobias Bille Clausen	(Denmark) Tobias Bille Clausen
2	R2	(Spain) Circuit de Barcelona-Catalunya	(Germany) No. 8 BWT Mücke Motorsport	(Germany) No. 8 BWT Mücke Motorsport
2	R2	(Spain) Circuit de Barcelona-Catalunya	(Denmark) Mads Kjelde Larsen	(Denmark) Mads Kjelde Larsen
2	R3	(Spain) Circuit de Barcelona-Catalunya	(Germany) No. 8 BWT Mücke Motorsport	(Germany) No. 8 BWT Mücke Motorsport
2	R3	(Spain) Circuit de Barcelona-Catalunya	(Denmark) Tobias Bille Clausen (Denmark) Mads Kjelde Larsen	(Denmark) Tobias Bille Clausen (Denmark) Mads Kjelde Larsen

== Championship standings ==
=== Points system ===
Position	1st	2nd	3rd	4th	5th	6th	7th	8th	9th	10th
Points	25	18	15	12	10	8	6	4	2	1

=== Drivers' Championship ===
Pos.	Driver	Team	ARA (Spain)		CAT (Spain)			Points
Pos.	Driver	Team	R1	R2	R1	R2	R3	Points
1	(Denmark) Tobias Bille Clausen (Denmark) Mads Kjelde Larsen	(Germany) BWT Mücke Motorsport	2	3	1	1	1	108
2	(Denmark) Michael Hove (South Africa) Andrew Rackstraw	(Denmark) High Class Racing	3	4	2	2	2	63
3	(Sweden) Linus Hellberg	(Sweden) Allay Racing	1	2				43
4	(Sweden) Emil Hellberg	(Sweden) Allay Racing	4	1				37
Pos.	Driver	Team	ARA (Spain)		CAT (Spain)			Points
