= 2024 ADAC GT4 Germany =

Motorsport season

The 2024 ADAC GT4 Germany season was the sixth season of ADAC GT4 Germany, a sports car championship created and organised by the ADAC. The season started on 26 April at Oschersleben and finished on 20 October at the Hockenheimring.

== Calendar ==
| Round | Circuit | Date | Map of circuit locations | |
|---|---|---|---|---|
| 1 | Motorsport Arena Oschersleben, Oschersleben, Germany | 26–28 April | 2024 ADAC GT4 Germany is located in Germany | 2024 ADAC GT4 Germany is located in Austria |
| 2 | Lausitzring, Klettwitz, Germany | 24–26 May | 2024 ADAC GT4 Germany is located in Germany | 2024 ADAC GT4 Germany is located in Austria |
| 3 | Norisring, Nuremberg, Germany | 5–7 July | 2024 ADAC GT4 Germany is located in Germany | 2024 ADAC GT4 Germany is located in Austria |
| 4 | Nürburgring, Nürburg, Germany | 16–18 August | 2024 ADAC GT4 Germany is located in Germany | 2024 ADAC GT4 Germany is located in Austria |
| 5 | Red Bull Ring, Spielberg, Austria | 27–29 September | 2024 ADAC GT4 Germany is located in Germany | 2024 ADAC GT4 Germany is located in Austria |
| 6 | Hockenheimring, Hockenheim, Germany | 18–20 October | 2024 ADAC GT4 Germany is located in Germany | 2024 ADAC GT4 Germany is located in Austria |

== Entry list ==
| Team | Car | No. | Drivers | Class | Rounds |
|---|---|---|---|---|---|
| (Germany) PROsport Racing | Aston Martin Vantage AMR GT4 | 1 | (Austria) Raphael Rennhofer | G | 6 |
| (Germany) PROsport Racing | Aston Martin Vantage AMR GT4 | 1 | (Germany) Hugo Sasse | G | 6 |
| (Switzerland) Hofor Racing by Bonk Motorsport | BMW M4 GT4 | 2 | (Italy) Gabriele Piana | | All |
| (Switzerland) Hofor Racing by Bonk Motorsport | BMW M4 GT4 | 2 | (Germany) Michael Schrey | | All |
| (Switzerland) Hofor Racing by Bonk Motorsport | BMW M4 GT4 | 3 | (Germany) Tim Reiter | | All |
| (Switzerland) Hofor Racing by Bonk Motorsport | BMW M4 GT4 | 3 | (Germany) Leon Wassertheurer | | All |
| (Germany) BWT Mücke Motorsport | Mercedes-AMG GT4 | 8 | (France) Luca Bosco | J | All |
| (Germany) BWT Mücke Motorsport | Mercedes-AMG GT4 | 8 | (Germany) Mattis Pluschkell | J | All |
| (Germany) BWT Mücke Motorsport | Mercedes-AMG GT4 | 18 | (Spain) Marc de Fulgencio | | All |
| (Germany) BWT Mücke Motorsport | Mercedes-AMG GT4 | 18 | (France) Enzo Joulié | J | All |
| (Germany) AVIA W&S Motorsport | Porsche 718 Cayman GT4 Clubsport | 9 | (Israel) Alon Gabbay | | All |
| (Germany) AVIA W&S Motorsport | Porsche 718 Cayman GT4 Clubsport | 9 | (Bulgaria) Tano Neumann | T | All |
| (Germany) AVIA W&S Motorsport | Porsche 718 Cayman GT4 Clubsport | 30 | (Germany) Max Kronberg | T | All |
| (Germany) AVIA W&S Motorsport | Porsche 718 Cayman GT4 Clubsport | 30 | (Germany) Hendrik Still | | All |
| (Germany) AVIA W&S Motorsport | Porsche 718 Cayman GT4 Clubsport | 31 | (Czech Republic) Josef Knopp | J | All |
| (Germany) AVIA W&S Motorsport | Porsche 718 Cayman GT4 Clubsport | 31 | (Germany) Finn Zulauf | J | All |
| (Germany) AVIA W&S Motorsport | Porsche 718 Cayman GT4 Clubsport | 32 | (Jamaica) Thomas Gore | J | 4–6 |
| (Germany) AVIA W&S Motorsport | Porsche 718 Cayman GT4 Clubsport | 32 | (Jamaica) Senna Summerbell | | 4–6 |
| (Austria) Razoon – more than racing | Porsche 718 Cayman GT4 Clubsport | 10 | (Germany) Denny Berndt | J | All |
| (Austria) Razoon – more than racing | Porsche 718 Cayman GT4 Clubsport | 10 | (Denmark) Simon Birch | J | All |
| (Austria) Razoon – more than racing | Porsche 718 Cayman GT4 Clubsport | 20 | (Italy) Diego Stifter | J | 1–3 |
| (Austria) Razoon – more than racing | Porsche 718 Cayman GT4 Clubsport | 20 | (Austria) Maximilian Tarillion | J | 1–3 |
| (Austria) Razoon – more than racing | Porsche 718 Cayman GT4 Clubsport | 40 | (Austria) Daniel Drexel | | All |
| (Austria) Razoon – more than racing | Porsche 718 Cayman GT4 Clubsport | 40 | (Germany) Adrian Rziczny | J | All |
| (Austria) Razoon – more than racing | BMW M4 GT4 | 20 | (Canada) Damon Surzyshyn | T | 4–6 |
| (Austria) Razoon – more than racing | BMW M4 GT4 | 20 | (Czech Republic) Jan Matyas | | 4–5 |
| (Austria) Razoon – more than racing | BMW M4 GT4 | 20 | (Germany) Luca Link | J | 6 |
| (Czech Republic) SAPE Motorsport | Audi R8 LMS GT4 Evo | 24 | (Jamaica) Thomas Gore | J | 1–2 |
| (Czech Republic) SAPE Motorsport | Audi R8 LMS GT4 Evo | 24 | (Jamaica) Senna Summerbell | | 1–2 |
| (Germany) FK Performance Motorsport | BMW M4 GT4 | 46 | (South Africa) Leyton Fourie | J | All |
| (Germany) FK Performance Motorsport | BMW M4 GT4 | 46 | (Germany) Max Rosam | J | All |
| (Germany) FK Performance Motorsport | BMW M4 GT4 | 47 | (United Kingdom) Tom Edgar | J | All |
| (Germany) FK Performance Motorsport | BMW M4 GT4 | 47 | (United Kingdom) Joseph Warhurst | J | All |
| (Germany) FK Performance Motorsport | BMW M4 GT4 | 48 | (Netherlands) Gianni van de Craats | J | All |
| (Germany) FK Performance Motorsport | BMW M4 GT4 | 48 | (United Kingdom) Mohan Ritson | | 1–3, 5–6 |
| (Germany) FK Performance Motorsport | BMW M4 GT4 | 48 | (Netherlands) Maxime Oosten | | 4 |
| (Germany) FK Performance Motorsport | BMW M4 GT4 | 49 | (South Africa) Joseph Ellerine | | All |
| (Germany) FK Performance Motorsport | BMW M4 GT4 | 49 | (Germany) Niels Tröger | | All |
| (Germany) Zakspeed ESM | Aston Martin Vantage AMR GT4 | 55 | (Germany) Philipp Gogollok | J | All |
| (Germany) Zakspeed ESM | Aston Martin Vantage AMR GT4 | 55 | (Germany) Jan Marschalkowski | | All |
| (Italy) Promodrive | BMW M4 GT4 | 62 | (San Marino) Ugo Federico Bagnasco | G | 5 |
| (Italy) Promodrive | BMW M4 GT4 | 62 | (Finland) Benjamin Sylvestersson | G | 5 |
| (Germany) ME-Motorsport | BMW M4 GT4 | 66 | (Germany) Markus Eichele | T | All |
| (Germany) ME-Motorsport | BMW M4 GT4 | 66 | (Germany) Philip Wiskirchen | J | All |
| (Germany) ME-Motorsport | BMW M4 GT4 | 77 | (Denmark) Andreas Jochimsen | | All |
| (Germany) ME-Motorsport | BMW M4 GT4 | 77 | (Germany) Thomas Rackl | J | All |
| (Austria) Wimmer Werk Motorsport | Porsche 718 Cayman GT4 Clubsport | 71 | (Austria) Philipp Dietrich | | All |
| (Austria) Wimmer Werk Motorsport | Porsche 718 Cayman GT4 Clubsport | 71 | (Austria) David Lackner | J | 1–5 |
| (Austria) Wimmer Werk Motorsport | Porsche 718 Cayman GT4 Clubsport | 71 | (Austria) Max Wimmer | | 6 |
| (Austria) Wimmer Werk Motorsport | Porsche 718 Cayman GT4 Clubsport | 91 | (Armenia) Ivan Ekelchik | | All |
| (Austria) Wimmer Werk Motorsport | Porsche 718 Cayman GT4 Clubsport | 91 | (Germany) Ferdinand Winter | | All |
| (Germany) CV Performance Group | Mercedes-AMG GT4 | 83 | (Switzerland) Max Huber | | 1–3 |
| (Germany) CV Performance Group | Mercedes-AMG GT4 | 83 | (Czech Republic) Michal Makeš | | 1–3 |
| (Germany) CV Performance Group | Mercedes-AMG GT4 | 84 | (Australia) Lachlan Robinson | | All |
| (Germany) CV Performance Group | Mercedes-AMG GT4 | 84 | (Finland) Matias Salonen | | All |
| (Germany) CV Performance Group | Mercedes-AMG GT4 | 85 | (United Kingdom) Alex Connor | J | All |
| (Germany) CV Performance Group | Mercedes-AMG GT4 | 85 | (Germany) Jan Philipp Springob | | All |
| (Germany) CV Performance Group | Mercedes-AMG GT4 | 86 | (Norway) Emil Gjerdrum | J | 1–5 |
| (Germany) CV Performance Group | Mercedes-AMG GT4 | 86 | (United Kingdom) Will Tregurtha | | 1–5 |
| (Hong Kong) KCMG | Toyota GR Supra GT4 | 87 | (New Zealand) Tom Bewley | G | 4 |
| (Hong Kong) KCMG | Toyota GR Supra GT4 | 87 | (New Zealand) William Exton | G | 4 |

== Race results ==
| Round | | Circuit | Date | Pole position | Race winner |
|---|---|---|---|---|---|
| 1 | R1 | (Germany) Motorsport Arena Oschersleben | 27 April | (Switzerland) #2 Hofor Racing by Bonk Motorsport | (Switzerland) #2 Hofor Racing by Bonk Motorsport |
| 1 | R1 | (Germany) Motorsport Arena Oschersleben | 27 April | (Italy) Gabriele Piana (Germany) Michael Schrey | (Italy) Gabriele Piana (Germany) Michael Schrey |
| 1 | R2 | (Germany) Motorsport Arena Oschersleben | 28 April | (Switzerland) #3 Hofor Racing by Bonk Motorsport | (Switzerland) #2 Hofor Racing by Bonk Motorsport |
| 1 | R2 | (Germany) Motorsport Arena Oschersleben | 28 April | (Germany) Tim Reiter (Germany) Leon Wassertheurer | (Italy) Gabriele Piana (Germany) Michael Schrey |
| 2 | R1 | (Germany) Lausitzring | 25 May | (Germany) #18 BWT Mücke Motorsport | (Switzerland) #2 Hofor Racing by Bonk Motorsport |
| 2 | R1 | (Germany) Lausitzring | 25 May | (Spain) Marc de Fulgencio (France) Enzo Joulié | (Italy) Gabriele Piana (Germany) Michael Schrey |
| 2 | R2 | (Germany) Lausitzring | 26 May | (Germany) # 31 AVIA W&S Motorsport | (Germany) #18 BWT Mücke Motorsport |
| 2 | R2 | (Germany) Lausitzring | 26 May | (Czech Republic) Josef Knopp (Germany) Finn Zulauf | (Spain) Marc de Fulgencio (France) Enzo Joulié |
| 3 | R1 | (Germany) Norisring | 6 July | (Switzerland) #2 Hofor Racing by Bonk Motorsport | (Switzerland) #2 Hofor Racing by Bonk Motorsport |
| 3 | R1 | (Germany) Norisring | 6 July | (Italy) Gabriele Piana (Germany) Michael Schrey | (Italy) Gabriele Piana (Germany) Michael Schrey |
| 3 | R2 | (Germany) Norisring | 7 July | (Germany) #31 AVIA W&S Motorsport | (Germany) #31 AVIA W&S Motorsport |
| 3 | R2 | (Germany) Norisring | 7 July | (Czech Republic) Josef Knopp (Germany) Finn Zulauf | (Czech Republic) Josef Knopp (Germany) Finn Zulauf |
| 4 | R1 | (Germany) Nürburgring | 17 August | (Switzerland) #2 Hofor Racing by Bonk Motorsport | (Austria) #91 Wimmer Werk Motorsport |
| 4 | R1 | (Germany) Nürburgring | 17 August | (Italy) Gabriele Piana (Germany) Michael Schrey | (Armenia) Ivan Ekelchik (Germany) Ferdinand Winter |
| 4 | R2 | (Germany) Nürburgring | 18 August | (Germany) #30 AVIA W&S Motorsport | (Switzerland) #2 Hofor Racing by Bonk Motorsport |
| 4 | R2 | (Germany) Nürburgring | 18 August | (Germany) Max Kronberg (Germany) Hendrik Still | (Italy) Gabriele Piana (Germany) Michael Schrey |
| 5 | R1 | (Austria) Red Bull Ring | 28 September | (Germany) #55 Zakspeed ESM | (Germany) #31 AVIA W&S Motorsport |
| 5 | R1 | (Austria) Red Bull Ring | 28 September | (Germany) Jan Marschalkowski (Germany) Philipp Gogollok | (Czech Republic) Josef Knopp (Germany) Finn Zulauf |
| 5 | R2 | (Austria) Red Bull Ring | 29 September | (Germany) #31 AVIA W&S Motorsport | (Germany) #55 Zakspeed ESM |
| 5 | R2 | (Austria) Red Bull Ring | 29 September | (Czech Republic) Josef Knopp (Germany) Finn Zulauf | (Germany) Jan Marschalkowski (Germany) Philipp Gogollok |
| 6 | R1 | (Germany) Hockenheimring | 19 October | (Germany) #31 AVIA W&S Motorsport | (Germany) #1 PROsport Racing |
| 6 | R1 | (Germany) Hockenheimring | 19 October | (Czech Republic) Josef Knopp (Germany) Finn Zulauf | (Austria) Raphael Rennhofer (Germany) Hugo Sasse |
| 6 | R2 | (Germany) Hockenheimring | 20 October | (Germany) #1 PROsport Racing | (Austria) #10 Razoon – more than racing |
| 6 | R2 | (Germany) Hockenheimring | 20 October | (Austria) Raphael Rennhofer (Germany) Hugo Sasse | (Germany) Denny Berndt (Denmark) Simon Birch |
