= 2026 GT Winter Series =

Motor racing tournament season

The 2026 GT Winter Series was the sixth season of the GT Winter Series, a grand tourer motor racing championship organised by Gedlich Racing. It started at 16 January in Circuito do Estoril and finished at 9 March in Circuit de Barcelona-Catalunya.

== Calendar ==
Each event consisted of three races; two races of 30 minutes, and one of 55 minutes with a mandatory pit-stop.

Portimão 6 Hours

Round	Circuit	Date	Supporting	Map of circuit locations
1	Algarve International Circuit, Portimão, Portugal	15–18 January	GT4 Winter Series; Prototype Winter Series	2026 GT Winter Series is located in Iberia
2	Circuito do Estoril, Estoril, Portugal	22–25 January	Formula Winter Series; GT4 Winter Series; Prototype Winter Series	2026 GT Winter Series is located in Iberia
NC	Algarve International Circuit, Portimão, Portugal	5–8 February	Formula Winter Series; Sports Prototypes Winter Series	2026 GT Winter Series is located in Iberia
3	Circuit Ricardo Tormo, Cheste, Spain	12–15 February	Formula Winter Series; GT4 Winter Series; Sports Prototypes Winter Series	2026 GT Winter Series is located in Iberia
4	MotorLand Aragón, Alcañiz, Spain	5–8 March	Formula Winter Series; GT4 Winter Series; Prototype Winter Series	2026 GT Winter Series is located in Iberia
5	Circuit de Barcelona-Catalunya, Montmeló, Spain	12–15 March	Formula Winter Series; GT4 Winter Series; Prototype Winter Series	2026 GT Winter Series is located in Iberia

== Classes ==
Class
GT2	For FIA and SRO-homologated Group GT2 cars.
GT3 GT3 Pro	For FIA Group GT3 cars. For GT3 cars with at least one Gold driver.
Cup 1	For Ferrari 296 Challenge cars.
Cup 2	For Porsche 911 GT3 Cup cars.
Cup 3	For McLaren Artura Trophy and 570S Trophy cars.
Cup 4	For Lamborghini Huracán Super Trofeo cars.
Cup 5	For Ferrari 458 Challenge, 488 Challenge and 488 Challenge Evo cars.
Cup X	For every car not mentioned in other classes that fits in the performance window.

== Entry list ==
Team	Car	Engine	No.	Drivers	Class	Rounds
GT3
(Poland) Olimp Racing	Ferrari 296 GT3	Ferrari F163CE 3.0 L Turbo V6	5	(Poland) Stanisław Jedliński		1
(Poland) Olimp Racing	Ferrari 296 GT3	Ferrari F163CE 3.0 L Turbo V6	777	(Poland) Karol Basz		1
(Poland) Olimp Racing	Ferrari 296 GT3	Ferrari F163CE 3.0 L Turbo V6	777	(Poland) Krystian Korzeniowski		1
(Germany) SR Motorsport by Schnitzelalm	Mercedes-AMG GT3 Evo	Mercedes-AMG M159 6.2 L V8	11	(Germany) Kenneth Heyer		All
(Germany) SR Motorsport by Schnitzelalm	Mercedes-AMG GT3 Evo	Mercedes-AMG M159 6.2 L V8	11	(Germany) Jay Mo Härtling		All
(Germany) SR Motorsport by Schnitzelalm	Mercedes-AMG GT3 Evo	Mercedes-AMG M159 6.2 L V8	111	(Germany) Michael Sander		1, 3
(Germany) SR Motorsport by Schnitzelalm	Mercedes-AMG GT3 Evo	Mercedes-AMG M159 6.2 L V8	111	(Germany) Moritz Wiskirchen		1, 3
(Portugal) AF Motorsport	Porsche 911 GT3 R (991.2)	Porsche M97/80 4.0 L Flat-6	17	(United States) André Manuel Renha Fernandes		1–2, 5
(Portugal) AF Motorsport	Porsche 911 GT3 R (991.2)	Porsche M97/80 4.0 L Flat-6	17	(Italy) Angelo Fontana		5
(Germany) Liqui Moly Team Engstler	Lamborghini Huracán GT3 Evo 2	Lamborghini DGF 5.2 L V10	19	(Austria) Tim Hütter		1, 3
(Germany) Liqui Moly Team Engstler	Lamborghini Huracán GT3 Evo 2	Lamborghini DGF 5.2 L V10	19	(Lithuania) Jonas Karklys		1–2
(Germany) Liqui Moly Team Engstler	Lamborghini Huracán GT3 Evo 2	Lamborghini DGF 5.2 L V10	19	(Singapore) Ethan Brown		3
(Germany) Liqui Moly Team Engstler	Lamborghini Huracán GT3 Evo 2	Lamborghini DGF 5.2 L V10	19	(Switzerland) Felix Hirsiger		4
(Germany) Liqui Moly Team Engstler	Lamborghini Huracán GT3 Evo 2	Lamborghini DGF 5.2 L V10	19	(Germany) Finn Zulauf		4
(Germany) Liqui Moly Team Engstler	Lamborghini Huracán GT3 Evo 2	Lamborghini DGF 5.2 L V10	63	(Switzerland) Felix Hirsiger		3
(Germany) Liqui Moly Team Engstler	Lamborghini Huracán GT3 Evo 2	Lamborghini DGF 5.2 L V10	63	(Germany) Finn Zulauf		3
(Poland) PTT Racing	Mercedes-AMG GT3 Evo	Mercedes-AMG M159 6.2 L V8	27	(Poland) Przemysław Bieńkowski		All
(Poland) PTT Racing	Mercedes-AMG GT3 Evo	Mercedes-AMG M159 6.2 L V8	27	(Poland) Mateusz Lisowski		1, 3–5
(Germany) CBRX by SPS Automotive Performance	Mercedes-AMG GT3 Evo	Mercedes-AMG M159 6.2 L V8	54	(Switzerland) Dexter Müller		1–2
(Germany) Haupt Racing Team	Ford Mustang GT3	Ford Coyote 5.4 L V8	64	(Austria) Kiano Blum		1, 3
(Germany) Haupt Racing Team	Ford Mustang GT3	Ford Coyote 5.4 L V8	64	(Norway) Emil Christian Gjerdrum		1
(Germany) Haupt Racing Team	Ford Mustang GT3	Ford Coyote 5.4 L V8	64	(Germany) Niklas Kalus		3
(Germany) Haupt Racing Team	Ford Mustang GT3	Ford Coyote 5.4 L V8	74	(Italy) Max Cuccarese		1, 3
(Germany) Haupt Racing Team	Ford Mustang GT3	Ford Coyote 5.4 L V8	74	(Switzerland) Alain Valente		1, 3
(Italy) Antonelli Motorsport	Mercedes-AMG GT3 Evo	Mercedes-AMG M159 6.2 L V8	64	(Israel) Guy Albag		4–5
(Italy) VSR	Lamborghini Huracán GT3 Evo 2	Lamborghini DGF 5.2 L V10	66	(Italy) Ignazio Zanon		2, 5
(Italy) VSR	Lamborghini Huracán GT3 Evo 2	Lamborghini DGF 5.2 L V10	66	(Italy) Mattia Michelotto		2, 5
(United Kingdom) Orange Racing by JMH Automotive	McLaren 720S GT3 Evo	McLaren M840T 4.0 L Turbo V8	67	(United Kingdom) Marcus Clutton		All
(United Kingdom) Orange Racing by JMH Automotive	McLaren 720S GT3 Evo	McLaren M840T 4.0 L Turbo V8	67	(United Kingdom) Simon Orange		All
(Lithuania) Juta Racing	Audi R8 LMS Evo II	Audi DAR 5.2 L V10	71	(Lithuania) Arunas Geciauskas		1, 4
(Belgium) BDR Grupo Prom Racing Team	Mercedes-AMG GT3 Evo	Mercedes-AMG M159 6.2 L V8	77	(Mexico) Alfredo Hernández Ortega		1–3, 5
(Poland) Sendom Racing Team	Lamborghini Huracán GT3 Evo	Lamborghini DGF 5.2 L V10	79	(Poland) Seweryn Mazur		2–5
(Czech Republic) Senkyr Motorsport	BMW M4 GT3 Evo	BMW P58 3.0 L Turbo I6	80	(Slovakia) Rudolf Beňo		5
(Czech Republic) Senkyr Motorsport	BMW M4 GT3 Evo	BMW P58 3.0 L Turbo I6	80	(Slovakia) Richard Gonda		5
(Japan) Norik Racing	Ferrari 296 GT3	Ferrari F163CE 3.0 L Turbo V6	81	(Italy) Stefano Costantini		1
(Japan) Norik Racing	Ferrari 296 GT3	Ferrari F163CE 3.0 L Turbo V6	81	(Japan) Norikazu Shibata		1, 3
(Japan) Norik Racing	Ferrari 296 GT3	Ferrari F163CE 3.0 L Turbo V6	81	(Japan) Taku Bamba		3
(Italy) AF Corse	Ferrari 296 GT3	Ferrari F163CE 3.0 L Turbo V6	96	(Ukraine) Yaroslav Veselaho		1, 5
(Switzerland) Oehler Motorsport	Porsche 911 GT3 R (992.2)	Porsche M97/80 4.2 L Flat-6	84	(Switzerland) Oliver Vietze		5
(Switzerland) Oehler Motorsport	Porsche 911 GT3 R (992.2)	Porsche M97/80 4.2 L Flat-6	899	(Switzerland) Tim Vietze		5
(Germany) Attempto Racing	Audi R8 LMS Evo II	Audi DAR 5.2 L V10	86	(Germany) Carrie Schreiner		3
(Germany) Attempto Racing	Audi R8 LMS Evo II	Audi DAR 5.2 L V10	86	(Israel) Ariel Levi		3, 5
(Germany) Attempto Racing	Audi R8 LMS Evo II	Audi DAR 5.2 L V10	86	(Germany) Florian Scholze		5
(Belgium) Comtoyou Racing	Aston Martin Vantage AMR GT3 Evo	Aston Martin M177 4.0 L Turbo V8	247	(Netherlands) Jan Jaap van Roon		5
(Belgium) Comtoyou Racing	Aston Martin Vantage AMR GT3 Evo	Aston Martin M177 4.0 L Turbo V8	247	(Netherlands) Tom Coronel		5
(Spain) SMC Motorsport	McLaren 720S GT3 Evo	McLaren M840T 4.0 L Turbo V8	707	(Spain) Alejandro Geppert		5
(Spain) SMC Motorsport	McLaren 720S GT3 Evo	McLaren M840T 4.0 L Turbo V8	707	(Spain) Jean-Baptiste Simmenauer		5
GT2
(Spain) NM Racing Team	Mercedes-AMG GT2	Mercedes-AMG M178 4.0 L Turbo V8	15	(Spain) Nil Montserrat		1, 3
(Spain) NM Racing Team	Mercedes-AMG GT2	Mercedes-AMG M178 4.0 L Turbo V8	15	(United Kingdom) Branden Lee Oxley		1
(Spain) NM Racing Team	Mercedes-AMG GT2	Mercedes-AMG M178 4.0 L Turbo V8	15	(Spain) Alberto de Martin		3, 5
(Spain) NM Racing Team	Mercedes-AMG GT2	Mercedes-AMG M178 4.0 L Turbo V8	15	(Spain) Manel Lao Cornago		5
GTX
(Italy) Auto Sport Racing	Lamborghini Huracán Super Trofeo Evo 2	Lamborghini DGF 5.2 L V10	18	(Germany) Michael Fischbaum		4–5
(Italy) Auto Sport Racing	Lamborghini Huracán Super Trofeo Evo 2	Lamborghini DGF 5.2 L V10	18	(Serbia) Milos Pavlovic		4–5
(Austria) MZR Motorsportzentrum Ried	KTM X-Bow GT2	Audi DNWA 2.5 L Turbo I5	34	(Oman) Hamed Al-Wahaibi		5
(Austria) MZR Motorsportzentrum Ried	KTM X-Bow GT2	Audi DNWA 2.5 L Turbo I5	34	(United Kingdom) Jon Lancaster		5
(Austria) MZR Motorsportzentrum Ried	KTM X-Bow GT2	Audi DNWA 2.5 L Turbo I5	119	(Austria) Marius Aigner		5
(Germany) Classic&Speed	BMW Z4 GT3	BMW P65B44 4.0 L V8	888	(Germany) Marcus Oeyenhausen		1
(Germany) Classic&Speed	BMW Z4 GT3	BMW P65B44 4.0 L V8	888	(Germany) Chistoph Oeyenhausen		1, 3
Cup 1
(Switzerland) Kessel Racing	Ferrari 296 Challenge	Ferrari F163 3.0 L Turbo V6	13	(Switzerland) Lukas Azzato		1–2
(Switzerland) Kessel Racing	Ferrari 296 Challenge	Ferrari F163 3.0 L Turbo V6	13	(Italy) Alberto Cola		1
(Italy) Rossocorsa	Ferrari 296 Challenge	Ferrari F163 3.0 L Turbo V6	70	(Italy) Raffaele Vitale		5
(Italy) Rossocorsa	Ferrari 296 Challenge	Ferrari F163 3.0 L Turbo V6	70	(Italy) Nicola de Marco		5
(Italy) Rossocorsa	Ferrari 296 Challenge	Ferrari F163 3.0 L Turbo V6	75	(Italy) Giacomo Rinaldo		4
(Italy) Rossocorsa	Ferrari 296 Challenge	Ferrari F163 3.0 L Turbo V6	75	(Italy) Samuele Buttarelli		4
(Italy) Reparto Corse RAM	Ferrari 296 Challenge	Ferrari F163 3.0 L Turbo V6	83	(Italy) Giorgio Bacco		3
(Italy) Reparto Corse RAM	Ferrari 296 Challenge	Ferrari F163 3.0 L Turbo V6	83	(Italy) Giulio Bacco		3
(Italy) AF Corse	Ferrari 296 Challenge	Ferrari F163 3.0 L Turbo V6	85	(United Kingdom) Sean Ran		1, 3
(Italy) AF Corse	Ferrari 296 Challenge	Ferrari F163 3.0 L Turbo V6	85	(United Kingdom) Josh Steed		1, 3
(Italy) AF Corse	Ferrari 296 Challenge	Ferrari F163 3.0 L Turbo V6	101	(United Kingdom) Gilbert Yates		3
(Italy) AF Corse	Ferrari 296 Challenge	Ferrari F163 3.0 L Turbo V6	101	(United Kingdom) Bradley Yates		3
(Italy) AF Corse	Ferrari 296 Challenge	Ferrari F163 3.0 L Turbo V6	105	(United Kingdom) Darren Howell		3
(Italy) AF Corse	Ferrari 296 Challenge	Ferrari F163 3.0 L Turbo V6	105	(Republic of Ireland) Sean Doyle		3
(Italy) AF Corse	Ferrari 296 Challenge	Ferrari F163 3.0 L Turbo V6	204	(United Kingdom) Joseph Dean		2–3
(Italy) AF Corse	Ferrari 296 Challenge	Ferrari F163 3.0 L Turbo V6	204	(United Kingdom) Aston Millar		2–3
(Italy) AF Corse	Ferrari 296 Challenge	Ferrari F163 3.0 L Turbo V6	680	(Singapore) Sean Hudspeth		1
(Italy) AF Corse	Ferrari 296 Challenge	Ferrari F163 3.0 L Turbo V6	680	(Sweden) Carl Runefelt		1
(Italy) GABS Competizioni	Ferrari 296 Challenge	Ferrari F163 3.0 L Turbo V6	89	(Netherlands) Leon Rijnbeek		3
(Portugal) Araújo Competição	Ferrari 296 Challenge	Ferrari F163 3.0 L Turbo V6	150	(Portugal) Álvaro Ramos		3
(Portugal) Araújo Competição	Ferrari 296 Challenge	Ferrari F163 3.0 L Turbo V6	150	(Portugal) Gonçalo Araújo		3
(Germany) Liqui Moly Team Engstler	Ferrari 296 Challenge	Ferrari F163 3.0 L Turbo V6	155	(Austria) Friedrich Müller		1
(Germany) Liqui Moly Team Engstler	Ferrari 296 Challenge	Ferrari F163 3.0 L Turbo V6	155	(Switzerland) Felix Hirsiger		2
Cup 2
(Portugal) Nacente Racing	Porsche 992 GT3 Cup (992.1)	Porsche 4.0 L Flat-6	4	(Canada) Kevin King		1, 4
(Portugal) Nacente Racing	Porsche 992 GT3 Cup (992.1)	Porsche 4.0 L Flat-6	4	(Portugal) Alexandre Martins		4
(Poland) PTT Racing	Porsche 992 GT3 Cup (992.1)	Porsche 4.0 L Flat-6	7	(Poland) Igor Klaja		All
(Poland) PTT Racing	Porsche 992 GT3 Cup (992.1)	Porsche 4.0 L Flat-6	7	(Poland) Fabian Dybionka		3, 5
(Portugal) AF Motorsport	Porsche 992 GT3 Cup (992.1)	Porsche 4.0 L Flat-6	10	(Brazil) Pipo Massa		5
(Portugal) AF Motorsport	Porsche 992 GT3 Cup (992.1)	Porsche 4.0 L Flat-6	10	(Brazil) Felipe Massa		5
(Sweden) Team Steiner Racing	Porsche 992 GT3 Cup (992.1)	Porsche 4.0 L Flat-6	43	(Sweden) Anders Steiner		1, 3, 5
(Sweden) Team Steiner Racing	Porsche 992 GT3 Cup (992.1)	Porsche 4.0 L Flat-6	43	(Sweden) Marcus Annervi		3, 5
(Sweden) Team Steiner Racing	Porsche 992 GT3 Cup (992.1)	Porsche 4.0 L Flat-6	47	(Sweden) Mats Kimby		1, 3, 5
(Sweden) Team Steiner Racing	Porsche 992 GT3 Cup (992.1)	Porsche 4.0 L Flat-6	78	(Sweden) Ulrik Forsberg		1, 3, 5
(Czech Republic) Senkyr Motorsport	Porsche 992 GT3 Cup (992.1)	Porsche 4.0 L Flat-6	87	(Czech Republic) Pavel Bouška		5
(Germany) P. Terting by Up2Race	Porsche 992 GT3 Cup (992.1)	Porsche 4.0 L Flat-6	88	(Germany) Fabio Grosse		1, 3
(Germany) P. Terting by Up2Race	Porsche 992 GT3 Cup (992.1)	Porsche 4.0 L Flat-6	88	(Ukraine) Oleksiy Kikireshko		1–3
(Austria) MS Racing	Porsche 992 GT3 Cup (992.1)	Porsche 4.0 L Flat-6	112	(Austria) Benedikt Seipt		3
(Austria) MS Racing	Porsche 992 GT3 Cup (992.1)	Porsche 4.0 L Flat-6	112	(Austria) Werner Panhauser		3
(Portugal) LMR Motorsport	Porsche 992 GT3 Cup (992.1)	Porsche 4.0 L Flat-6	911	(Spain) Pablo Bras		1
(Portugal) LMR Motorsport	Porsche 992 GT3 Cup (992.1)	Porsche 4.0 L Flat-6	911	(Portugal) Leandro Martins		1
Cup 3
(Austria) MS Racing	McLaren Artura Trophy Evo	McLaren M630 3.0 L Turbo V6	128	(Austria) Fabian Seipt		3
(Austria) MS Racing	McLaren Artura Trophy Evo	McLaren M630 3.0 L Turbo V6	128	(Lithuania) Kajus Siksnelis		3
(Austria) MS Racing	McLaren Artura Trophy Evo	McLaren M630 3.0 L Turbo V6	128	(Germany) Andreas Greiling		5
(Austria) MS Racing	McLaren Artura Trophy Evo	McLaren M630 3.0 L Turbo V6	128	(Germany) Jens Richter		5
Cup 4
(Poland) UNIQ Racing	Lamborghini Huracán Super Trofeo Evo 2	Lamborghini DGF 5.2 L V10	25	(Poland) Jerzy Spinkiewicz		5
(Italy) Auto Sport Racing	Lamborghini Huracán Super Trofeo Evo 2	Lamborghini DGF 5.2 L V10	32	(Serbia) Petar Matić		2–5
(Italy) Auto Sport Racing	Lamborghini Huracán Super Trofeo Evo 2	Lamborghini DGF 5.2 L V10	333	(Serbia) Miloš Pavlović		1, 3
(Italy) Auto Sport Racing	Lamborghini Huracán Super Trofeo Evo 2	Lamborghini DGF 5.2 L V10	333	(Italy) Alessio Ruffini		1–3, 5
(Denmark) DC Motorsport	Lamborghini Huracán Super Trofeo Evo 2	Lamborghini DGF 5.2 L V10	321	(Denmark) Nina Østergaard		3
(Denmark) DC Motorsport	Lamborghini Huracán Super Trofeo Evo 2	Lamborghini DGF 5.2 L V10	321	(Denmark) Frederik Schandorff		3
Cup 5
Cup X
(Germany) équipe vitesse	Porsche 991.1 GT3 Cup	Porsche 3.8 L Flat-6	147	(Germany) Jann Jöge		3

== Race Results ==
Bold indicates overall winner.

Round	Circuit		Pole position	GT2 Winners	GT3 Winners	GTX Winners	Cup 1 Winners	Cup 2 Winners	Cup 3 Winners	Cup 4 Winners	Cup 5 Winners	Cup X Winners	Invitational Winners
1	R1	(Portugal) Algarve International Circuit	(Germany) No. 64 HRT Ford Performance	(Spain) No. 15 NM Racing Team	**(Poland) No. 777 Olimp Racing**	(Germany) No. 888 Classic&Speed	(Italy) No. 680 AF Corse	(Portugal) No. 911 LMR Motorsport	No Entries	(Italy) No. 333 Auto Sport Racing	No Entries	No Entries	No Entries
1	R1	(Portugal) Algarve International Circuit	(Austria) Kiano Blum	(United Kingdom) Branden Lee Oxley	**(Poland) Krystian Korzeniowski**	(Germany) Chistoph Oeyenhausen	(Sweden) Carl Runefelt	(Spain) Pablo Bras	No Entries	(Italy) Alessio Ruffini	No Entries	No Entries	No Entries
1	R2	(Portugal) Algarve International Circuit	(Poland) No. 777 Olimp Racing	(Spain) No. 15 NM Racing Team	**(Germany) No. 11 SR Motorsport by Schnitzelalm**	(Germany) No. 888 Classic&Speed	(Switzerland) No. 13 Kessel Racing	(Portugal) No. 911 LMR Motorsport	No Entries	(Italy) No. 333 Auto Sport Racing	No Entries	No Entries	No Entries
1	R2	(Portugal) Algarve International Circuit	(Poland) Karol Basz	(Spain) Nil Montserrat	**(Germany) Jay Mo Härtling**	(Germany) Chistoph Oeyenhausen	(Switzerland) Lukas Azzato	(Portugal) Leandro Martins	No Entries	(Italy) Alessio Ruffini	No Entries	No Entries	No Entries
1	R3	(Portugal) Algarve International Circuit	(Poland) No. 777 Olimp Racing	(Spain) No. 15 NM Racing Team	**(Poland) No. 777 Olimp Racing**	(Germany) No. 888 Classic&Speed	(Italy) No. 680 AF Corse	(Portugal) No. 911 LMR Motorsport	No Entries	No Entries	No Entries	No Entries	No Entries
1	R3	(Portugal) Algarve International Circuit	(Poland) Krystian Korzeniowski	(Spain) Nil Montserrat (United Kingdom) Branden Lee Oxley	**(Poland) Karol Basz** **(Poland) Krystian Korzeniowski**	(Germany) Chistoph Oeyenhausen (Germany) Marcus Oeyenhausen	(Singapore) Sean Hudspeth (Sweden) Carl Runefelt	(Spain) Pablo Bras (Portugal) Leandro Martins	No Entries	No Entries	No Entries	No Entries	No Entries
2	R1	(Portugal) Circuito do Estoril											
2	R2	(Portugal) Circuito do Estoril											
2	R3	(Portugal) Circuito do Estoril											
3	R1	(Spain) Circuit Ricardo Tormo											
3	R2	(Spain) Circuit Ricardo Tormo											
3	R3	(Spain) Circuit Ricardo Tormo											
4	R1	(Spain) MotorLand Aragón											
4	R2	(Spain) MotorLand Aragón											
4	R3	(Spain) MotorLand Aragón											
5	R1	(Spain) Circuit de Barcelona-Catalunya											
5	R2	(Spain) Circuit de Barcelona-Catalunya											
5	R3	(Spain) Circuit de Barcelona-Catalunya											

== Championship standings ==
In a two-driver entry, only one driver will compete in each of the two sprint races – regardless of which driver competes, both receive the associated points. GTX entries are ineligible for points.

=== Scoring system ===
Overall classification will be based on the points scored in class.

Position in class	Number of starters per class						
Position in class	1	2	3	4	5	6	7+
1st	10	12	14	16	18	20	20
2nd		10	12	14	16	18	18
3rd			10	12	14	16	16
4th				10	12	14	14
5th					10	12	12
6th						10	10
7th+							8

=== Overall ===
Pos.	Driver	Team	Class	ALG (Portugal)			EST (Portugal)			CRT (Spain)			ARA (Spain)			BAR (Spain)			Points
Pos.	Driver	Team	Class	R1	R2	R3	R1	R2	R3	R1	R2	R3	R1	R2	R3	R1	R2	R3	Points
1	(Spain) Pablo Bras (Portugal) Leandro Martins	(Portugal) No. 911 LMR Motorsport	Cup 2	14^{1; 20}	17^{1; 20}	16^{1; 20}													60
2	(Poland) Karol Basz (Poland) Krystian Korzeniowski	(Poland) No. 777 Olimp Racing	GT3	1^{1; 20}	2^{2; 18}	1^{1; 20}													58
3	(Poland) Igor Klaja	(Poland) No. 7 PTT Racing Team	Cup 2	18^{2; 18}	23^{2; 18}	21^{4; 14}													50
4	(Germany) Fabio Grosse (Ukraine) Oleksiy Kikireshko	(Germany) No. 88 P. Terting by Up2Race	Cup 2	25^{4; 14}	24^{3; 16}	18^{2; 18}													48
5	(Lithuania) Arunas Geciauskas	(Lithuania) No. 71 Juta Racing	GT3	3^{3; 16}	4^{4; 14}	3^{3; 16}													46
=	(Singapore) Sean Hudspeth (Sweden) Carl Runefelt	(Italy) No. 680 AF Corse	Cup 1	16^{1; 16}	19^{2; 14}	14^{1; 16}													46
=	(Sweden) Marcus Annervi (Sweden) Anders Steiner	(Sweden) No. 43 Team Steiner Racing	Cup 2	19^{3; 16}	25^{4; 14}	20^{3; 16}													46
6	(Austria) Kiano Blum (Norway) Emil Christian Gjerdrum	(Germany) No. 64 HRT Ford Performance	GT3	2^{2; 18}	8^{8; 8}	2^{2; 18}													44
7	(United Kingdom) Marcus Clutton (United Kingdom) Simon Orange	(United Kingdom) No. 67 Orange Racing by JMH Automotive	GT3	6^{6; 10}	3^{3; 16}	5^{5; 12}													38
=	(Italy) Max Cuccarese (Switzerland) Alain Valente	(Germany) No. 74 HRT Ford Performance	GT3	5^{5; 12}	5^{5; 12}	4^{4; 14}													38
8	(Germany) Kenneth Heyer (Germany) Jay Mo Härtling	(Germany) No. 11 SR Motorsport by Schnitzelalm	GT3	11^{10; 8}	1^{1; 20}	8^{8; 8}													36
9	(Ukraine) Yaroslav Veselaho	(Italy) No. 96 AF Corse	GT3	4^{4; 14}	6^{6; 10}	7^{7; 8}													32
10	(Spain) Nil Montserrat (United Kingdom) Branden Lee Oxley	(Spain) No. 15 NM Racing Team	GT2	8^{1; 10}	15^{1; 10}	12^{1; 10}													30
=	(Sweden) Ulrik Forsberg	(Sweden) No. 48 Team Steiner Racing	Cup 2	29^{7; 8}	27^{6; 10}	22^{5; 12}													30
11	(Switzerland) Lukas Azzato (Italy) Alberto Cola	(Switzerland) No. 13 Kessel Racing	Cup 1	21^{3; 12}	18^{1; 16}	19^{3; 12}													28
12	(United Kingdom) Sean Ran (United Kingdom) Josh Steed	(Italy) No. 85 AF Corse	Cup 1	20^{2; 14}	21^{3; 12}	15^{2; 14}													26
=	(Germany) Michael Sander (Germany) Moritz Wiskirchen	(Germany) No. 111 SR Motorsport by Schnitzelalm	GT3	23^{14; 8}	7^{7; 8}	6^{6; 10}													26
13	(Austria) Tim Hütter (Lithuania) Jonas Karklys	(Germany) No. 19 LIQUI MOLY Team Engstler	GT3	9^{8; 8}	9^{9; 8}	9^{9; 8}													24
=	(Mexico) Alfredo Hernández Ortega	(Belgium) No. 77 BDR Grupo Prom Racing Team	GT3	10^{9; 8}	16^{13; 8}	13^{12; 8}													24
=	(United States) André Manuel Renha Fernandes	(Portugal) No. 17 AF Motorsport	GT3	13^{11; 8}	10^{10; 8}	11^{11; 8}													24
=	(Poland) Przemysław Bieńkowski (Poland) Mateusz Lisowski	(Poland) No. 27 PTT Racing Team	GT3	15^{12; 8}	14^{12; 8}	25^{13; 8}													24
=	(Italy) Stefano Costantini (Japan) Norikazu Shibata	(Italy) No. 81 Norik Racing	GT3	22^{13; 8}	20^{14; 8}	10^{10; 8}													24
14	(Sweden) Mats Kimby	(Sweden) No. 47 Team Steiner Racing	Cup 2	27^{5; 12}	Ret	23^{6; 10}													22
=	(Canada) Kevin King	(Portugal) No. 4 Nacente Racing	Cup 2	28^{6; 10}	26^{5; 12}	24^{7; 8}													22
15	(Serbia) Miloš Pavlović (Italy) Alessio Ruffini	(Italy) No. 333 Auto Sport Racing	Cup 4	17^{1; 10}	11^{1; 10}	DNS													20
=	(Austria) Friedrich Müller	(Germany) No. 155 LIQUI MOLY Team Engstler	Cup 1	24^{4; 10}	22^{4; 10}	Ret													20
16	(Switzerland) Dexter Müller	(Germany) No. 54 CBRX by SPS Automotive Performance	GT3	7^{7; 8}	12^{11; 8}	Ret													16
17	(Poland) Stanisław Jedliński	(Poland) No. 5 Olimp Racing	GT3	26^{15; 8}	DNS	DNS													8
GTX and Invitational entries ineligible for scoring points.
NC	(Germany) Chistoph Oeyenhausen (Germany) Marcus Oeyenhausen	(Germany) No. 888 Classic&Speed	GTX	12^{1; 0}	13^{1; 0}	17^{1; 0}													0
Pos.	Driver	Team		ALG (Portugal)			EST (Portugal)			CRT (Spain)			ARA (Spain)			BAR (Spain)			Points

Colour	Result
Gold	Winner
Silver	Second place
Bronze	Third place
Green	Points classification
Blue	Non-points classification
Blue	Non-classified finish (NC)
Purple	Retired, not classified (Ret)
Red	Did not qualify (DNQ)
Red	Did not pre-qualify (DNPQ)
Black	Disqualified (DSQ)
White	Did not start (DNS)
White	Withdrew (WD)
White	Race cancelled (C)
Blank	Did not practice (DNP)
Blank	Did not arrive (DNA)
Blank	Excluded (EX)

**Bold** – Pole

Italics – Fastest Lap

† — Did not finish, but classified

^{1 2 3...} – Position in class

#^{#
20} – Points scored

== 6H of Portimão ==
The non-championship round at Portimão was a six-hour, multi-class endurance race featuring entries from both the GT and GT4 Winter Series championships.

=== Classes ===
Class
GT2	For FIA and SRO-homologated Group GT2 cars.
GT3 GT3 Pro	For FIA Group GT3 cars. For GT3 cars with at least one Gold driver.
GT4	For FIA and SRO-homologated Group GT4 cars.
Cup 1	For Ferrari 296 Challenge cars.
Cup 2	For Porsche 992 GT3 Cup cars.
Cup 3	For Porsche 991 GT3 Cup cars.
Cup 4	For Lamborghini Huracán Super Trofeo cars.
Cup 5	For Porsche Cayman GT4 CS cars.
Cup X	For every car not mentioned in other classes that fits in the performance window.

=== Entry list ===
Team	Car	Engine	No.	Drivers	Class
GT3
(Belgium) Comtoyou Racing	Aston Martin Vantage AMR GT3 Evo	Aston Martin M177 4.0 L Turbo V8	007	(United States) Aaron Muss	
(Belgium) Comtoyou Racing	Aston Martin Vantage AMR GT3 Evo	Aston Martin M177 4.0 L Turbo V8	007	(Sweden) Oliver Söderström	
(Belgium) Comtoyou Racing	Aston Martin Vantage AMR GT3 Evo	Aston Martin M177 4.0 L Turbo V8	007	(France) Baudouin Detout	
(Portugal) AF Motorsport	Porsche 911 GT3 R (991.2)	Porsche M97/80 4.0 L Flat-6	17	(United States) André Manuel Renha Fernandes	
(Portugal) AF Motorsport	Porsche 911 GT3 R (991.2)	Porsche M97/80 4.0 L Flat-6	17	(Venezuela) Angelo Fontana	
(Portugal) AF Motorsport	Porsche 911 GT3 R (991.2)	Porsche M97/80 4.0 L Flat-6	17	(Brazil) Rogério Grotta	
(Germany) Team Motopark	Mercedes-AMG GT3 Evo	Mercedes-AMG M159 6.2 L V8	28	(Australia) Christian Mansell	
(Germany) Team Motopark	Mercedes-AMG GT3 Evo	Mercedes-AMG M159 6.2 L V8	28	(Mexico) Marcelo Ramírez	
(United Kingdom) Greystone GT	McLaren 720S GT3 Evo	McLaren M840T 4.0 L Turbo V8	44	(Australia) Jayden Kelly	
(United Kingdom) Greystone GT	McLaren 720S GT3 Evo	McLaren M840T 4.0 L Turbo V8	44	(United Kingdom) Zac Meakin	
(United Kingdom) Greystone GT	McLaren 720S GT3 Evo	McLaren M840T 4.0 L Turbo V8	44	(Monaco) Louis Prette	
(Lithuania) Juta Racing	Audi R8 LMS Evo II	Audi DAR 5.2 L V10	71	(Italy) Nicola Michelon	
(Lithuania) Juta Racing	Audi R8 LMS Evo II	Audi DAR 5.2 L V10	71	(United States) Marc Sharinn	
(Lithuania) Juta Racing	Audi R8 LMS Evo II	Audi DAR 5.2 L V10	71	(United States) Tyler Sharinn	
(Germany) Attempto Racing	Audi R8 LMS Evo II	Audi DAR 5.2 L V10	86	(Germany) Florian Scholze	
(Germany) Attempto Racing	Audi R8 LMS Evo II	Audi DAR 5.2 L V10	86	(Germany) Carrie Schreiner	
(Germany) Attempto Racing	Audi R8 LMS Evo II	Audi DAR 5.2 L V10	86	(Israel) Ariel Levi	
(Spain) E2P Racing	Aston Martin Vantage AMR GT3 Evo	Aston Martin M177 4.0 L Turbo V8	90	(Spain) Pablo Burguera	
(Spain) E2P Racing	Aston Martin Vantage AMR GT3 Evo	Aston Martin M177 4.0 L Turbo V8	90	(Spain) Antonio Sainero	
(Spain) E2P Racing	Aston Martin Vantage AMR GT3 Evo	Aston Martin M177 4.0 L Turbo V8	90	(Spain) Oliver Campos	
(Italy) Iron Lynx	Mercedes-AMG GT3 Evo	Mercedes-AMG M159 6.2 L V8	108	(Zimbabwe) Ameerh Naran	
(Italy) Iron Lynx	Mercedes-AMG GT3 Evo	Mercedes-AMG M159 6.2 L V8	108	(Pakistan) Shawn Rashid	
(Italy) Iron Lynx	Mercedes-AMG GT3 Evo	Mercedes-AMG M159 6.2 L V8	108	(Brazil) Sergio Sette Camara	
GT2
(Germany) SR Motorsport by Schnitzelalm	Mercedes-AMG GT2	Mercedes-AMG M178 4.0 L Turbo V8	11	(United States) David Thilenius	
(Germany) SR Motorsport by Schnitzelalm	Mercedes-AMG GT2	Mercedes-AMG M178 4.0 L Turbo V8	11	(Germany) Kenneth Heyer	
(Germany) SR Motorsport by Schnitzelalm	Mercedes-AMG GT2	Mercedes-AMG M178 4.0 L Turbo V8	11	(Germany) Wilhelm Kühne	
Cup 2
(Switzerland) XRacing	Porsche 992 GT3 Cup	Porsche 4.0 L Flat-6	19	(Switzerland) Peter Brunner	
(Switzerland) XRacing	Porsche 992 GT3 Cup	Porsche 4.0 L Flat-6	19	(Austria) Günter Benninger	
(Switzerland) XRacing	Porsche 992 GT3 Cup	Porsche 4.0 L Flat-6	19	(Switzerland) Andreas Heiniger	
(Portugal) LMR Motorsport	Porsche 992 GT3 Cup	Porsche 4.0 L Flat-6	27	(Brazil) Sérgio Ramalho	
(Portugal) LMR Motorsport	Porsche 992 GT3 Cup	Porsche 4.0 L Flat-6	27	(Brazil) Josimar Jr.	
(Portugal) LMR Motorsport	Porsche 992 GT3 Cup	Porsche 4.0 L Flat-6	27	(Brazil) Daniel Neumann	
(Portugal) LMR Motorsport	Porsche 992 GT3 Cup	Porsche 4.0 L Flat-6	911	(Portugal) Leandro Martins	
(Portugal) LMR Motorsport	Porsche 992 GT3 Cup	Porsche 4.0 L Flat-6	911	(Germany) Dieter Svepes	
(Sweden) Team Steiner Racing	Porsche 992 GT3 Cup	Porsche 4.0 L Flat-6	77	(Sweden) Anders Steiner	
(Sweden) Team Steiner Racing	Porsche 992 GT3 Cup	Porsche 4.0 L Flat-6	77	(Sweden) Mats Kimby	
(Sweden) Team Steiner Racing	Porsche 992 GT3 Cup	Porsche 4.0 L Flat-6	77	(Sweden) Ulrik Forsberg	
Cup 3
(United Kingdom) Greystone GT	McLaren Artura Trophy Evo	McLaren M630 3.0 L Turbo V6	33	(United Kingdom) Josh Mason	
(United Kingdom) Greystone GT	McLaren Artura Trophy Evo	McLaren M630 3.0 L Turbo V6	33	(United Kingdom) Michael O'Brien	
(United Kingdom) Greystone GT	McLaren Artura Trophy Evo	McLaren M630 3.0 L Turbo V6	33	(France) Hugo Bac	
GT4
(Spain) NM Racing Team	Mercedes-AMG GT4	Mercedes-AMG M178 4.0 L Twin-Turbo V8	15	(Portugal) Luis Liberal	
(Spain) NM Racing Team	Mercedes-AMG GT4	Mercedes-AMG M178 4.0 L Twin-Turbo V8	15	(Spain) Mario Pinazo	
(Spain) NM Racing Team	Mercedes-AMG GT4	Mercedes-AMG M178 4.0 L Twin-Turbo V8	15	(Lithuania) Vaidas Miciuda	
(Germany) W&S Motorsport	Porsche 718 Cayman GT4 RS Clubsport	Porsche MDG 4.0 L Flat-6	31	(Sweden) Daniel Nilsson	
(Germany) W&S Motorsport	Porsche 718 Cayman GT4 RS Clubsport	Porsche MDG 4.0 L Flat-6	31	(Sweden) Edvin Hellsten	
(Germany) W&S Motorsport	Porsche 718 Cayman GT4 RS Clubsport	Porsche MDG 4.0 L Flat-6	31	(Germany) Max Kronberg	
(Austria) Razoon - more than racing	Porsche 718 Cayman GT4 RS Clubsport	Porsche MDG 4.0 L Flat-6	70	(Austria) Daniel Drexel	
(Austria) Razoon - more than racing	Porsche 718 Cayman GT4 RS Clubsport	Porsche MDG 4.0 L Flat-6	70	(Germany) Gregor Schneider	
(Austria) Razoon - more than racing	Porsche 718 Cayman GT4 RS Clubsport	Porsche MDG 4.0 L Flat-6	70	(Canada) Taegen Poles	
(Germany) SR Motorsport by Schnitzelalm	Mercedes-AMG GT4	Mercedes-AMG M178 4.0 L Twin-Turbo V8	111	(Germany) David Thilenius	
(Germany) SR Motorsport by Schnitzelalm	Mercedes-AMG GT4	Mercedes-AMG M178 4.0 L Twin-Turbo V8	111	(Germany) Jay Mo Härtling	
(Germany) SR Motorsport by Schnitzelalm	Mercedes-AMG GT4	Mercedes-AMG M178 4.0 L Twin-Turbo V8	111	(Germany) Enrico Förderer	

=== Testing ===
Testing for the 6 Hours of Portimão consisted of four paid practice sessions and three private practice sessions.

Session	Day	Fastest Lap			
Session	Day	No.	Team	Car	Time
Paid practice 1	Thursday	86	(Germany) Attempto Racing	Audi R8 LMS Evo II	2:01.367
Paid practice 2	Thursday	28	(Germany) Team Motopark	Mercedes-AMG GT3 Evo	1:44.670
Paid practice 3	Thursday	44	(United Kingdom) Greystone GT	McLaren 720S GT3 Evo	1:43.547
Paid practice 4	Thursday	86	(Germany) Attempto Racing	Audi R8 LMS Evo II	1:43.231
Private practice 1	Friday	28	(Germany) Team Motopark	Mercedes-AMG GT3 Evo	1:59.306
Private practice 2	Friday	108	(Italy) Iron Lynx	Mercedes-AMG GT3 Evo	2:00.268
Private practice 3	Friday	108	(Italy) Iron Lynx	Mercedes-AMG GT3 Evo	2:00.326

=== Practice ===
Practice for the 6 Hours of Portimão consisted of one free practice session on Saturday morning.

Session	Day	Fastest Lap			
Session	Day	No.	Team	Car	Time
Free Practice	Saturday	44	(United Kingdom) Greystone GT	McLaren 720S GT3 Evo	2:05.362

=== Qualifying ===
Pos.	Class	No.	Team	Car	Time
1	GT3	44	(United Kingdom) Greystone GT	McLaren 720S GT3 Evo	1:59.812
2	GT3	28	(Germany) Team Motopark	Mercedes-AMG GT3 Evo	+0.912
3	GT3	108	(Italy) Iron Lynx	Mercedes-AMG GT3 Evo	+2.035
4	GT3	007	(Belgium) Comtoyou Racing	Aston Martin Vantage AMR GT3 Evo	+2.054
5	GT3	86	(Germany) Attempto Racing	Audi R8 LMS Evo II	+3.102
6	CUP2	911	(Portugal) LMR Motorsport	Porsche 992 GT3 Cup	+3.121
7	GT3	90	(Spain) E2P Racing	Aston Martin Vantage AMR GT3 Evo	+3.519
8	GT3	17	(Portugal) AF Motorsport	Porsche 911 GT3 R (991.2)	+4.185
9	CUP3	33	(United Kingdom) Greystone GT	McLaren Artura Trophy	+4.320
10	GT3	71	(Lithuania) Juta Racing	Audi R8 LMS Evo II	+5.113
11	GT2	11	(Germany) SR Motorsport by Schnitzelalm	Mercedes-AMG GT2	+5.912
12	CUP2	27	(Portugal) LMR Motorsport	Porsche 992 GT3 Cup	+6.522
13	GT4	111	(Germany) SR Motorsport by Schnitzelalm	Mercedes-AMG GT4	+6.933
14	GT4	31	(Germany) W&S Motorsport	Porsche 718 Cayman GT4 RS Clubsport	+9.167
15	GT4	15	(Spain) NM Racing Team	Mercedes-AMG GT4	+10.444
16	CUP2	77	(Sweden) Team Steiner Racing	Porsche 992 GT3 Cup	+10.741
17	CUP2	19	(Switzerland) XRacing	Porsche 992 GT3 Cup	+10.850
18	GT4	70	(Austria) Razoon - more than racing	Porsche 718 Cayman GT4 RS Clubsport	+12.961

=== Race ===
Class winners indicated in bold and with ‡.

Pos.	Class	No.	Team	Drivers	Car	Laps	Time/Retired
Pos.	Class	No.	Team	Drivers	Engine	Laps	Time/Retired
1	GT3	**44**	**(United Kingdom) Greystone GT**	**(Australia) Jayden Kelly** **(United Kingdom) Zac Meakin** **(Monaco) Louis Prette**	**McLaren 720S GT3 Evo**	**170**	**6:01:03.216‡**
1	GT3	**44**	**(United Kingdom) Greystone GT**	**(Australia) Jayden Kelly** **(United Kingdom) Zac Meakin** **(Monaco) Louis Prette**	**McLaren M840T 4.0 L Turbo V8**	**170**	**6:01:03.216‡**
2	GT3	108	(Italy) Iron Lynx	(Zimbabwe) Ameerh Naran (Pakistan) Shawn Rashid (Brazil) Sergio Sette Camara	Mercedes-AMG GT3 Evo	169	+1 Lap
2	GT3	108	(Italy) Iron Lynx	(Zimbabwe) Ameerh Naran (Pakistan) Shawn Rashid (Brazil) Sergio Sette Camara	Mercedes-AMG M159 6.2 L V8	169	+1 Lap
3	GT3	28	(Germany) Team Motopark	(Australia) Christian Mansell (Mexico) Marcelo Ramírez	Mercedes-AMG GT3 Evo	168	+2 Laps
3	GT3	28	(Germany) Team Motopark	(Australia) Christian Mansell (Mexico) Marcelo Ramírez	Mercedes-AMG M159 6.2 L V8	168	+2 Laps
4	GT3	007	(Belgium) Comtoyou Racing	(United States) Aaron Muss (Sweden) Oliver Söderström (France) Baudouin Detout	Aston Martin Vantage AMR GT3 Evo	167	+3 Laps
4	GT3	007	(Belgium) Comtoyou Racing	(United States) Aaron Muss (Sweden) Oliver Söderström (France) Baudouin Detout	Aston Martin M177 4.0 L Turbo V8	167	+3 Laps
5	GT3	86	(Germany) Attempto Racing	(Germany) Florian Scholze (Germany) Carrie Schreiner (Israel) Ariel Levi	Audi R8 LMS Evo II	167	+3 Laps
5	GT3	86	(Germany) Attempto Racing	(Germany) Florian Scholze (Germany) Carrie Schreiner (Israel) Ariel Levi	Audi DAR 5.2 L V10	167	+3 Laps
6	GT3	90	(Spain) E2P Racing	(Spain) Pablo Burguera (Spain) Antonio Sainero (Spain) Oliver Campos	Aston Martin Vantage AMR GT3 Evo	166	+4 Laps
6	GT3	90	(Spain) E2P Racing	(Spain) Pablo Burguera (Spain) Antonio Sainero (Spain) Oliver Campos	Aston Martin M177 4.0 L Turbo V8	166	+4 Laps
7	CUP2	**911**	**(Portugal) LMR Motorsport**	**(Portugal) Leandro Martins** **(Germany) Dieter Svepes**	**Porsche 992 GT3 Cup**	**166**	**+4 Laps‡**
7	CUP2	**911**	**(Portugal) LMR Motorsport**	**(Portugal) Leandro Martins** **(Germany) Dieter Svepes**	**Porsche 4.0 L Flat-6**	**166**	**+4 Laps‡**
8	GT3	17	(Portugal) AF Motorsport	(United States) André Manuel Renha Fernandes (Venezuela) Angelo Fontana (Brazil) Rogério Grotta	Porsche 992 GT3 Cup	164	+6 Laps
8	GT3	17	(Portugal) AF Motorsport	(United States) André Manuel Renha Fernandes (Venezuela) Angelo Fontana (Brazil) Rogério Grotta	Porsche 4.0 L Flat-6	164	+6 Laps
9	CUP3	**33**	**(United Kingdom) Greystone GT**	**(United Kingdom) Josh Mason** **(United Kingdom) Michael O'Brien** **(France) Hugo Bac**	**McLaren Artura Trophy**	**164**	**+6 Laps‡**
9	CUP3	**33**	**(United Kingdom) Greystone GT**	**(United Kingdom) Josh Mason** **(United Kingdom) Michael O'Brien** **(France) Hugo Bac**	**McLaren M630 3.0 L Turbo V6**	**164**	**+6 Laps‡**
10	CUP2	27	(Portugal) LMR Motorsport	(Brazil) Sérgio Ramalho (Brazil) Josimar Jr. (Brazil) Daniel Neumann	Porsche 992 GT3 Cup	163	+7 Laps
10	CUP2	27	(Portugal) LMR Motorsport	(Brazil) Sérgio Ramalho (Brazil) Josimar Jr. (Brazil) Daniel Neumann	Porsche 4.0 L Flat-6	163	+7 Laps
11	GT3	71	(Lithuania) Juta Racing	(Italy) Nicola Michelon (United States) Marc Sharinn (United States) Tyler Sharinn	Audi R8 LMS Evo II	163	+7 Laps
11	GT3	71	(Lithuania) Juta Racing	(Italy) Nicola Michelon (United States) Marc Sharinn (United States) Tyler Sharinn	Audi DAR 5.2 L V10	163	+7 Laps
12	GT2	**11**	**(Germany) SR Motorsport by Schnitzelalm**	**(United States) David Thilenius** **(Germany) Kenneth Heyer** **(Germany) Wilhelm Kühne**	**Mercedes-AMG GT2**	**161**	**+9 Laps**
12	GT2	**11**	**(Germany) SR Motorsport by Schnitzelalm**	**(United States) David Thilenius** **(Germany) Kenneth Heyer** **(Germany) Wilhelm Kühne**	**Mercedes-AMG M178 4.0 L Turbo V8**	**161**	**+9 Laps**
13	GT4	**111**	**(Germany) SR Motorsport by Schnitzelalm**	**(Germany) David Thilenius** **(Germany) Jay Mo Härtling** **(Germany) Enrico Förderer**	**Mercedes-AMG GT4**	**160**	**+10 Laps**
13	GT4	**111**	**(Germany) SR Motorsport by Schnitzelalm**	**(Germany) David Thilenius** **(Germany) Jay Mo Härtling** **(Germany) Enrico Förderer**	**Mercedes-AMG M178 4.0 L Twin-Turbo V8**	**160**	**+10 Laps**
14	GT4	31	(Germany) W&S Motorsport	(Sweden) Daniel Nilsson (Sweden) Edvin Hellsten (Germany) Max Kronberg	Porsche 718 Cayman GT4 RS Clubsport	159	+11 Laps
14	GT4	31	(Germany) W&S Motorsport	(Sweden) Daniel Nilsson (Sweden) Edvin Hellsten (Germany) Max Kronberg	Porsche MDG 4.0 L Flat-6	159	+11 Laps
15	CUP2	77	(Sweden) Team Steiner Racing	(Sweden) Anders Steiner (Sweden) Mats Kimby (Sweden) Ulrik Forsberg	Porsche 992 GT3 Cup	157	+13 Laps
15	CUP2	77	(Sweden) Team Steiner Racing	(Sweden) Anders Steiner (Sweden) Mats Kimby (Sweden) Ulrik Forsberg	Porsche 4.0 L Flat-6	157	+13 Laps
16	GT4	15	(Spain) NM Racing Team	(Portugal) Luis Liberal (Spain) Mario Pinazo (Lithuania) Vaidas Miciuda	Mercedes-AMG GT4	156	+14 Laps
16	GT4	15	(Spain) NM Racing Team	(Portugal) Luis Liberal (Spain) Mario Pinazo (Lithuania) Vaidas Miciuda	Mercedes-AMG M178 4.0 L Twin-Turbo V8	156	+14 Laps
17	CUP2	19	(Switzerland) XRacing	(Switzerland) Peter Brunner (Austria) Günter Benninger (Switzerland) Andreas Heiniger	Porsche 992 GT3 Cup	154	+16 Laps
17	CUP2	19	(Switzerland) XRacing	(Switzerland) Peter Brunner (Austria) Günter Benninger (Switzerland) Andreas Heiniger	Porsche 4.0 L Flat-6	154	+16 Laps
18	GT4	70	(Austria) Razoon - more than racing	(Austria) Daniel Drexel (Germany) Gregor Schneider (Canada) Taegen Poles	Porsche 718 Cayman GT4 RS Clubsport	91	+79 Laps
18	GT4	70	(Austria) Razoon - more than racing	(Austria) Daniel Drexel (Germany) Gregor Schneider (Canada) Taegen Poles	Porsche MDG 4.0 L Flat-6	91	+79 Laps

- Fastest race lap: 1:41.998 – Louis Prette
