= Finn Zulauf =

German racing driver (born 2004)

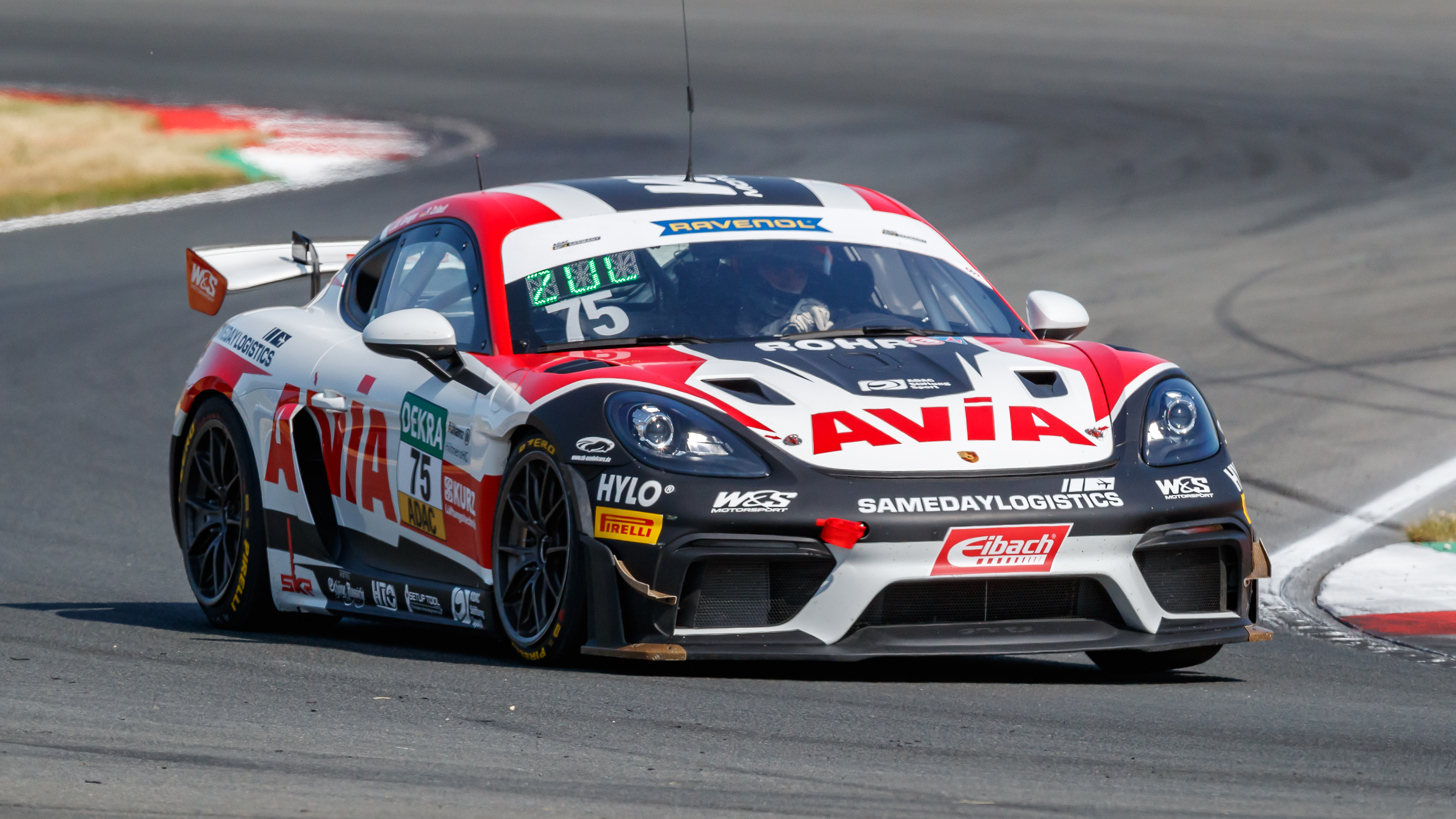
- Zulauf in 2023
- Nationality: (Germany) German
- Born: 25 July 2004 (age 22) Königstein im Taunus, Germany
- Categorisation: FIA Silver

Championship titles
- 2026 2024 2024: ADAC GT Masters; GT4 European Series – Pro-Am; ADAC GT4 Germany

Finn Zulauf (born 25 July 2004) is a German racing driver who last competed in ADAC GT Masters for Liqui Moly Team Engstler. He is the 2026 ADAC GT Masters champion alongside Felix Hirsiger.

== Career ==
Zulauf began karting at eight years old, competing until 2019. During his karting career, Zulauf most notably was runner-up in the 2017 Rotax Max Challenge Germany Mini standings, and also was the best rookie in the Junior class the following year.

After making his car racing debut in the 2020 DMV BMW Challenge series, Zulauf stepped up to GT4 competition the following year by competing in GTC Race and GT60 Race, along with a one-off guest appearance in ADAC GT4 Germany. After placing fifth and fourth in GT60 and GTC Race's GT4 standings, Zulauf earned a free GT3 seat for the following year's edition of the series.

In 2022, Zulauf joined Audi-affiliated Rutronik Racing for his debut in GT3 competition in GTC Race, whilst also making his full-time debut in ADAC GT4 Germany with Porsche-fielding AVIA W&S Motorsport. With Rutronik, Zulauf scored one overall win in both series as he ended the year runner-up in both series. In his maiden season of ADAC GT4 competition, Zulauf scored his maiden series win in the season-ending race at Hockenheimring and scored two more podiums to secure a fifth-place points finish.

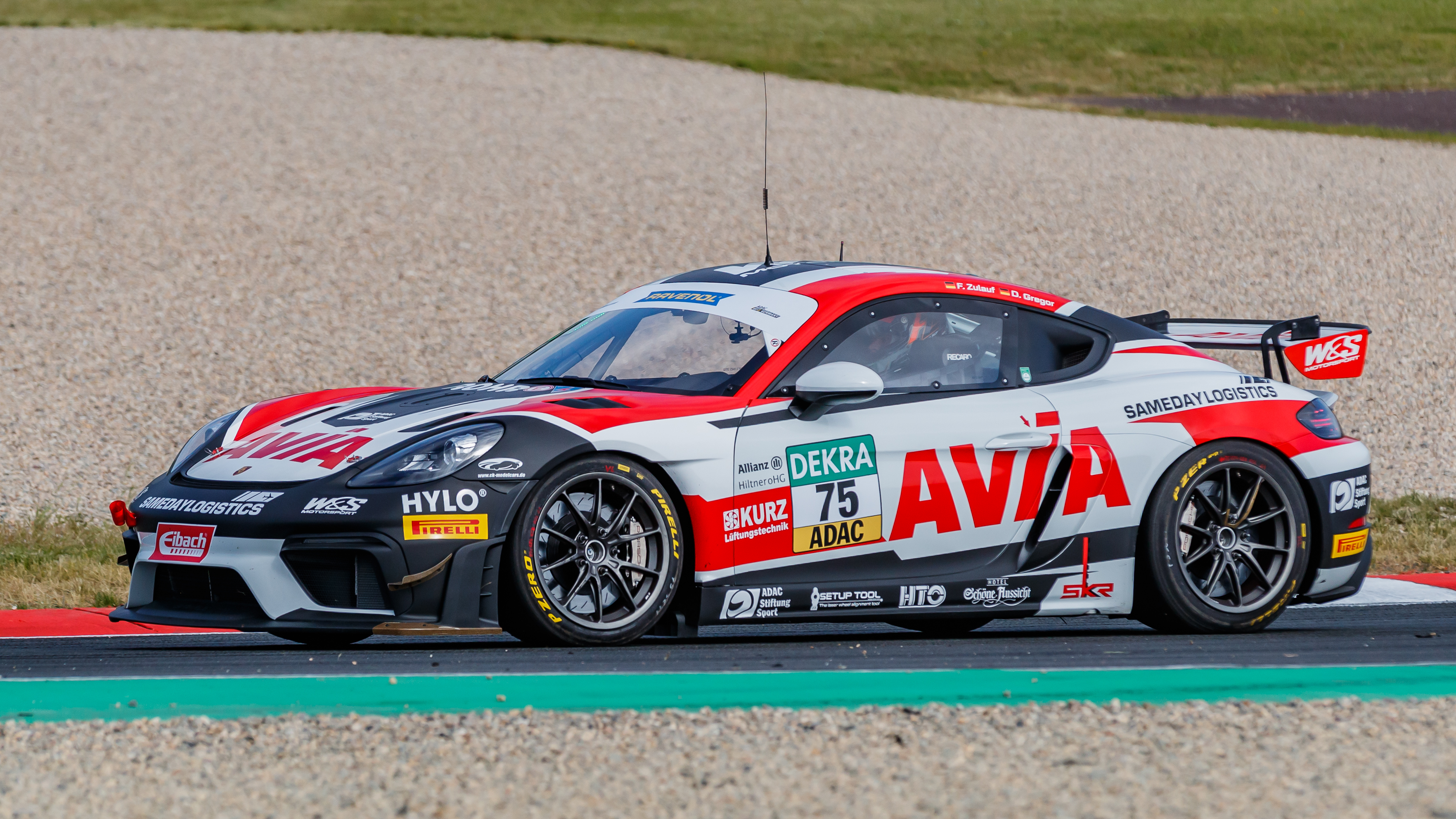
Zulauf's AVIA-backed Porsche Cayman GT4 at Oschersleben in 2023.

Remaining in both series for 2023, Zulauf stayed with W&S Motorsport for his sophomore year in ADAC GT4 Germany along with a dual campaign in Porsche Endurance Trophy Nürburgring Cup, and also joined Car Collection Motorsport to continue racing an Audi R8 LMS in GTC Race. In the former, Zulauf won at Lausitzring and scored two more podiums to end the year seventh in points. In GTC, Zulauf scored a lone win in the sprint series to take third in the GT3 Semi-Pro standings, and also took two overall race wins in the endurance series to help him secure runner-up honors in GT3 Semi-Pro.

The following year, Zulauf remained with W&S Motorsport to race in both ADAC GT4 Germany and the GT4 European Series. Alongside Josef Knopp in the former, the pair won at the Norisring and Red Bull Ring, and scored five more podiums to secure the title by 17 points at season's end. Racing in the Pro-Am class in Europe alongside Max Kronberg, the pair scored four class wins across the six-round season to clinch the title at the season finale at Jeddah.

In 2025, Zulauf stepped up to full-time GT3 competition, joining Lamborghini-aligned Paul Motorsport to race in ADAC GT Masters alongside Simon Connor Primm. Zulauf qualified on pole on debut at Lausitzring and repeated the same feat a round later at Zandvoort, where he scored his only win of the season in race one. However, Zulauf scored only one podium in the following four rounds, a third place finish at the Nürburgring, as he ended the year eighth in points. During 2025, Zulauf also raced for W&S Motorsport in the 24 Hours of Nürburgring, which he won in the Cup3 class.

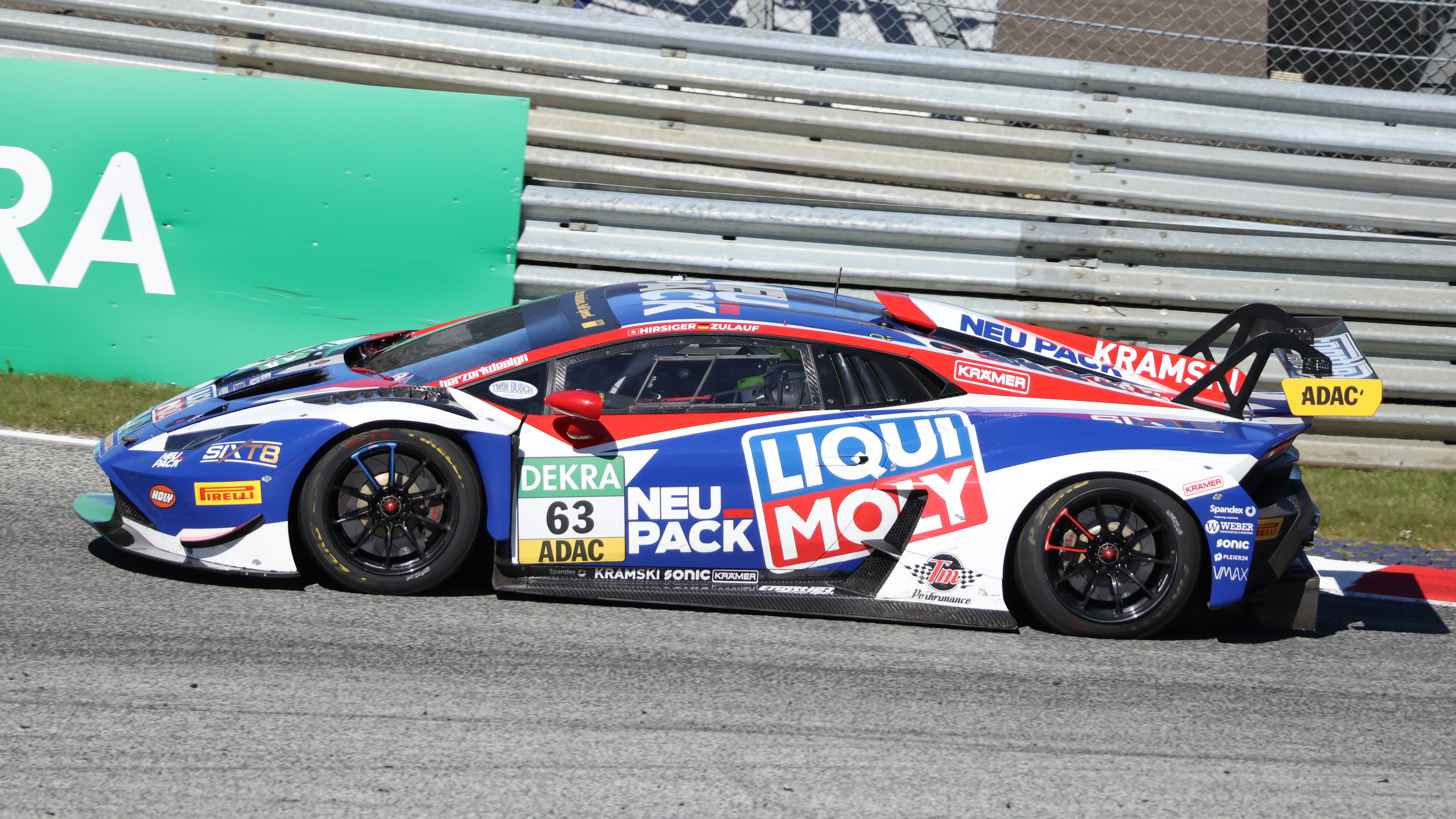
Zulauf's Liqui Moly–backed Lamborghini Huracán GT3 at the Red Bull Ring in 2026.

Zulauf remained in GT3 competition for 2026 as he joined fellow Lamborghini outfit Liqui Moly Team Engstler to race in select rounds of the GT Winter Series and the full ADAC GT Masters season, partnering Felix Hirsiger. In his main campaign, Zulauf opened up the season by winning at the Red Bull Ring and Zandvoort to take an early points lead. After a podium-less round at the Lausitzring, Zulauf won at the Nürburgring, before winning at the Salzburgring and Hockenheimring to seal the ADAC GT Masters title.

== Personal life ==
Zulauf is the son of Holger Zulauf, the CEO of SameDayLogistics, team principal of SDL Racing and an amateur racing driver. Zulauf's career is managed by Marco Wittmann through his agency 3Eleven Performance.

== Karting record ==
=== Karting career summary ===
Season	Series	Team	Position
2015	Rotax Max Challenge Germany – Micro		8th
2016	Rotax Max Challenge Germany – Mini		6th
2017	Rotax Max Challenge Germany – Mini		2nd
2018	Rotax Max Challenge Germany – Junior		10th
2018	Rotax Max Challenge Clubsport – Junior		7th
2019	Rotax Max Challenge Germany – Junior		17th

== Racing record ==
=== Racing career summary ===
Season	Series	Team	Races	Wins	Poles	F/Laps	Podiums	Points	Position
2020	DMV BMW Challenge – Cup	SDL Racing							9th
2021	ADAC GT4 Germany	W&S Motorsport	2	0	0	0	0	0	NC
2021	GT60 Race - GT4	W&S Motorsport	4	0	0	0	0	17.57	5th
2021	GTC Race - GT4 Junior Trophy	W&S Motorsport	4	1	0	0	3	27.51	4th
2022	ADAC GT4 Germany	AVIA W&S Motorsport	12	1	0	0	3	119	5th
2022	Nürburgring Langstrecken-Serie – V5	W&S Motorsport	2	0	0	0	0	0	NC
2022	GT60 Race - GT3 Pro	Rutronik Racing	5	2	0	0	3	22.50	**2nd**
2022	GTC Race - GT3 Semi-Pro	Rutronik Racing	5	2	0	0	5	27.92	**2nd**
2023	ADAC GT4 Germany	AVIA W&S Motorsport	12	1	1	0	3	95	7th
2023	Porsche Endurance Trophy Nürburgring - CUP3	AVIA W&S Motorsport	7	1	2	3	3	80.5	11th
2023	GT60 Race - GT3 Semi-Pro	Car Collection Motorsport	4	2	0	0	4	33.16	**2nd**
2023	GTC Race - GT3 Semi-Pro	Car Collection Motorsport	4	1	0	0	4	28.75	**3rd**
2024	ADAC GT4 Germany	AVIA W&S Motorsport	12	2	4	4	7	205	**1st**
2024	Nürburgring Langstrecken-Serie – SP10	AVIA W&S Motorsport	1	0	0	0	0	0	NC
2024	GT4 European Series – Pro-Am	W&S Motorsport	12	4	4	1	7	178	**1st**
2024	24 Hours of Nürburgring – SP10	W&S Motorsport	1	0	0	0	0	—N/a	11th
2025	ADAC GT Masters	Paul Motorsport	12	1	2	0	2	122	8th
2025	24 Hours of Nürburgring – Cup3	W&S Motorsport	1	1	0	0	1	—N/a	**1st**
2025	China GT Championship – GTS	Maxmore W&S Motorsport	2	2	0	0	2	25	10th
2026	GT Winter Series – GT3	Liqui Moly Team Engstler	5	1	0	0	3	56	15th
2026	Porsche Endurance Trophy Nürburgring Cup – CUP3	W&S Motorsport							
2026	ADAC GT Masters	Liqui Moly Team Engstler	12	5	4	3	7	227	**1st**
2026	Nürburgring Langstrecken-Serie – AT1	Max Kruse Racing	3	1	0	0	3	13	NC
2026	GT Summer Series – GT4 Am	Reiter Racing by campus-event.com	3	1	0	0	2	22	5th

=== Complete ADAC GT4 Germany results ===
(key) (Races in bold indicate pole position) (Races in italics indicate fastest lap)

Year	Team	Car	1	2	3	4	5	6	7	8	9	10	11	12	DC	Points
2021	W&S Motorsport	Porsche 718 Cayman GT4 Clubsport	OSC1; 1; 19	OSC1; 2; 18	RBR; 1	RBR; 2	ZAN; 1	ZAN; 2	SAC; 1	SAC; 2	HOC; 1	HOC; 2	NÜR; 1	NÜR; 2	NC	0
2022	AVIA W&S Motorsport	Porsche 718 Cayman GT4 Clubsport	OSC; 1; 4	OSC; 2 Ret	RBR; 1; 5	RBR; 2; 17	ZAN; 1; 5	ZAN; 2 Ret	NÜR; 1; 3	NÜR; 2; 8	SAC; 1; 5	SAC; 2; 8	HOC; 1; 3	HOC; 2; 1	5th	119
2023	AVIA W&S Motorsport	Porsche 718 Cayman GT4 Clubsport	OSC; 1; 8	OSC; 2; 13	ZAN; 1; 3	ZAN; 2; 10	NÜR; 1; 12	NÜR; 2; 2	LAU; 1; 1	**LAU**; **2** Ret	SAC; 1; 23	SAC; 2; 20	HOC; 1 Ret	HOC; 2; 4	7th	95
2024	AVIA W&S Motorsport	Porsche 718 Cayman GT4 Clubsport	OSC; 1; 4	OSC; 2; 2	LAU; 1; 4	**LAU**; **2**; 2	NOR; 1; 11	**NOR**; **2**; 1	NÜR; 1; 9	NÜR; 2; 3	RBR; 1; 1	**RBR**; **2**; 2	**HOC**; **1**; 2	HOC; 2; 4	1st	205

=== Complete GT4 European Series results ===
(key) (Races in bold indicate pole position) (Races in italics indicate fastest lap)

Year	Team	Car	Class	1	2	3	4	5	6	7	8	9	10	11	12	Pos	Points
2024	W&S Motorsport	Porsche 718 Cayman GT4 RS Clubsport	Pro-Am	LEC; 1; 13	**LEC**; **2**; 11	MIS; 1; 30	**MIS**; **2**; 40†	SPA; 1; 7	**SPA**; **2**; 18	HOC; 1; 19	**HOC**; **2**; 9	MNZ; 1; 17	MNZ; 2; 11	JED; 1 Ret	JED; 2; 15	1st	178

=== Complete ADAC GT Masters results ===
(key) (Races in bold indicate pole position) (Races in italics indicate fastest lap)

Year	Team	Car	1	2	3	4	5	6	7	8	9	10	11	12	DC	Points
2025	Paul Motorsport	Lamborghini Huracán GT3 Evo 2	**LAU**; **1**; 13^{1}	LAU; 2 Ret	ZAN; 1; 1^{3}	**ZAN**; **2**; 4^{1}	NÜR; 1; 3	NÜR; 2; 7	SAL; 1; 5	SAL; 2; 7	RBR; 1; 6	RBR; 2 Ret	HOC; 1; 5	HOC; 2; 11	8th	122
2026	Liqui Moly Team Engstler	Lamborghini Huracán GT3 Evo 2	**RBR**; **1**; 1^{1}	RBR; 2; 3^{3}	ZAN; 1; 4	ZAN; 2; 1^{2}	LAU; 1; 4	LAU; 2; 5^{3}	**NÜR**; **1**; 1^{1}	NÜR; 2; 9	**SAL**; **1**; 12^{1}	SAL; 2; 1	HOC; 1; 2	**HOC**; **2**; 1^{1}	1st	227
