= Josef Knopp =

Czech racing driver (born 2004)

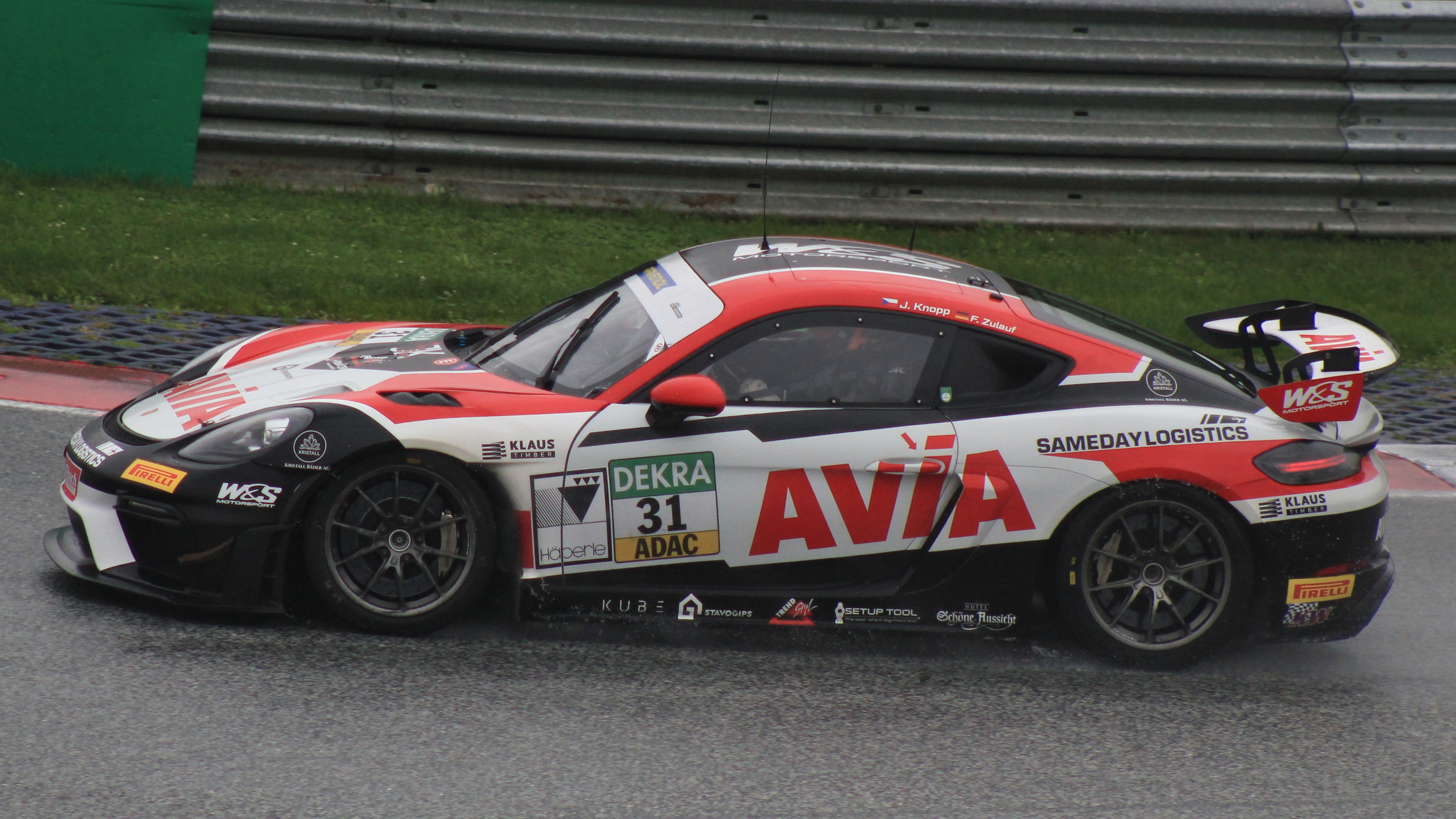
- Knopp driving for W&S Motorsport in 2024
- Nationality: (Czech Republic) Czech
- Born: 26 April 2004 (age 22) Plzeň, Czech Republic
- Categorisation: FIA Silver

Championship titles
- 2024: ADAC GT4 Germany

Josef "Pepino" Knopp (born 26 April 2004) is a Czech racing driver who last competed for Oregon Team in Lamborghini Super Trofeo Europe.

== Career ==
Knopp began karting at the age of ten, competing until 2019. During his karting career, he most notably finished third in the 2016 Easykart International Grand Final in the 60cc class.

Following a testing programme in Formula 4 machinery with Mücke Motorsport in 2019, Knopp remained with the team to make his single-seater debut in the third round of the 2020 Formula 4 UAE Championship. Racing in the last three rounds of the winter series, Knopp scored a best result of fourth in race two of the final round of the season at Dubai. For the rest of 2020, Knopp raced with the team in the ADAC Formula 4 Championship, scoring a best result of eighth five times as he ended the year 12th in points. Despite testing FIA Formula 3 machinery towards the end of the year for Charouz Racing System, Knopp elected to go back to karting for 2021, signing with Tony Kart Racing Team to race in the KZ2 class in mainly WSK-organized races.

Returning to cars in 2022, Knopp joined RTR Projects to make his ADAC GT4 Germany debut alongside Matěj Pavlíček. Racing with the team for all but one rounds of the season, Knopp scored a best result of 13th twice, before parting ways with the team and racing for CV Performance Group in the finale. During the year, Knopp also made one-off appearances in ESET Cup Series and DTM Trophy for RTR Projects. The following year, Knopp returned with BWT Mücke Motorsport to race in his sophomore season in ADAC GT4 Germany alongside Rodrigo Almeida. In their only season together, Knopp scored points all but three times and scored a best result of seventh at Lausitzring to end the year 16th in points.

Joining W&S Motorsport for his third season in GT4 competition, Knopp began the year in the GT4 Winter Series, scoring one overall win and four more Pro-Am wins to end the winter third in the class standings. For the rest of the year, Knopp returned to ADAC GT4 Germany alongside Finn Zulauf, scoring wins at Norisring and Red Bull Ring as they clinched their maiden series title at the finale at Hockenheimring.

The following year, Knopp joined Oregon Team to race in Lamborghini Super Trofeo Europe alongside Enzo Geraci. The pair won at Le Castellet and Monza to take an early lead in the Pro standings, but after scoring only two podiums in the following four rounds, the pair finished runner-up to Adam Putera by five points. Continuing with Oregon for 2026, albeit moving to Pro-Am with Pietro Perolini, Knopp took a lone win at Imola to secure third in class in Europe, whilst also securing runner-up honours in class at the end-of-year World Finals.

== Karting record ==
=== Karting career summary ===
Season	Series	Team	Position
2015	Easykart International Grand Final - Easykart 60	Knopp Josef	21st
2016	Trofeo Italiano Easykart - Easykart 60		6th
2016	Easykart International Grand Final - Easykart 60		3rd
2017	Trofeo Italiano Easykart - Easykart 100cc		8th
2017	WSK Final Cup - OK-J	CRG Racing Team	66th
2018	WSK Champions Cup - OK-J	TB Racing Team	NC
2018	WSK Super Master Series - OK-J	TB Racing Team	64th
2018	South Garda Winter Cup - OK-J	TB Racing Team	NC
2018	Andrea Margutti Trophy - OK-J	TB Racing Team	NC
2018	Deutsche Kart-Meisterschaft - OK-J	TB Racing Team	22nd
2018	Karting European Championship - OK-J	TB Racing Team	65th
2018	WSK Final Cup - OK	TB Racing Team	47th
2019	South Garda Winter Cup - OK	TB Racing Team	17th
2019	WSK Super Master Series - OK	TB Racing Team	49th
2019	Karting European Championship - OK	TB Racing Team	68th
2019	Deutsche Kart-Meisterschaft - OK	TB Racing Team	NC
2019	WSK Euro Series - OK	TB Racing Team	48th
2019	Karting World Championship - OK	TB Racing Team	NC
2021	WSK Champions Cup - KZ2	Tony Kart Racing Team	NC
2021	WSK Super Master Series - KZ2	Tony Kart Racing Team	57th
2021	WSK Euro Series - KZ2	Tony Kart Racing Team	25th
2021	Karting European Championship - KZ2	Tony Kart Racing Team	62nd
2021	International Super Cup - KZ2	Tony Kart Racing Team	NC
2021	WSK Open Cup - KZ2	Tony Kart Racing Team	37th

== Racing record ==
=== Racing career summary ===
Season	Series	Team	Races	Wins	Poles	F/Laps	Podiums	Points	Position
2020	Formula 4 UAE Championship	BWT Mücke Motorsport	12	0	0	1	0	65	9th
2020	Italian F4 Championship	BWT Mücke Motorsport	3	0	0	0	0	0	32nd
2020	ADAC Formula 4 Championship	ADAC Berlin-Brandenburg	21	0	0	0	0	32	12th
2022	ESET Cup – GT4	RTR Projects	1	1	1	1	1	12.5	6th
2022	DTM Trophy	RTR Projects	2	0	0	0	0	0	NC†
2022	ADAC GT4 Germany	RTR Projects	10	0	0	0	0	7	39th
2022	ADAC GT4 Germany	CV Performance Group	2	0	0	0	0	7	39th
2023	GT Winter Series	BWT Mücke Motorsport	?	?	?	?	?	39.41	18th
2023	ADAC GT4 Germany	BWT Mücke Motorsport	12	0	0	0	0	47	16th
2023	GT4 European Series – Silver	BWT Mücke Motorsport	2	0	0	0	0	2	37th
2024	GT4 Winter Series – Pro-Am	W&S Motorsport	6	5	1	3	6	42.49	**3rd**
2024	ADAC GT4 Germany	W&S Motorsport	12	4	4	1	7	178	**1st**
2025	Lamborghini Super Trofeo Europe – Pro	Oregon Team	12	2	2	2	5	109	**2nd**
2025	Lamborghini World Finals – Pro	Oregon Team	2	0	0	0	1	10	6th
2026	Lamborghini Super Trofeo Europe – Pro-Am	Oregon Team	11	1	0	0	6	100	**3rd**
2026	Lamborghini Super Trofeo World Finals – Pro-Am	Oregon Team	2	0	0	0	1	18	**2nd**

=== Complete Formula 4 UAE Championship results ===
(key) (Races in bold indicate pole position; races in italics indicate fastest lap)

Year	Team	1	2	3	4	5	6	7	8	9	10	11	12	13	14	15	16	17	18	19	20	DC	Points
2020	BWT Mücke Motorsport	DUB1; 1	DUB1; 2	DUB1; 3	DUB1; 4	YMC1; 1	YMC1; 2	YMC1; 3	YMC1; 4	YMC2; 1; 10	YMC2; 2 Ret	YMC2; 3; 9	YMC2; 4; 6	DUB2; 1; 6	DUB2; 2 Ret	DUB2; 3; 5	DUB2; 4; 8	DUB3; 1; 6	DUB3; 2; 4	DUB3; 3; 9	DUB3; 4; 5	9th	65

=== Complete ADAC Formula 4 Championship results ===
(key) (Races in bold indicate pole position) (Races in italics indicate fastest lap)

Year	Team	1	2	3	4	5	6	7	8	9	10	11	12	13	14	15	16	17	18	19	20	21	Pos	Points
2020	ADAC Berlin-Brandenburg	LAU1; 1; 8	LAU1; 2; 10	LAU1; 3; 8	NÜR1; 1; 11	NÜR1; 2; 10	NÜR1; 3; 13	HOC; 1; 14	HOC; 2; 15	HOC; 3; 10	NÜR2; 1; 9	NÜR2; 2; 13	NÜR2; 3; 8	RBR; 1; 8	RBR; 2 Ret	RBR; 3; 9	LAU2; 1; 11	LAU2; 2; 10	LAU2; 3; 9	OSC; 1; 8	OSC; 2; 9	OSC; 3; 12	12th	32

=== Complete Italian F4 Championship results ===
(key) (Races in bold indicate pole position) (Races in italics indicate fastest lap)

Year	Team	1	2	3	4	5	6	7	8	9	10	11	12	13	14	15	16	17	18	19	20	21	Pos	Points
2020	BWT Mücke Motorsport	MIS; 1	MIS; 2	MIS; 3	IMO1; 1	IMO1; 2	IMO1; 3	RBR; 1; 15	RBR; 2; 14	RBR; 3; 12	MUG; 1	MUG; 2	MUG; 3	MNZ; 1	MNZ; 2	MNZ; 3	IMO2; 1	IMO2; 2	IMO2; 3	VLL; 1	VLL; 2	VLL; 3	32nd	0

=== Complete ADAC GT4 Germany results ===
(key) (Races in bold indicate pole position) (Races in italics indicate fastest lap)

Year	Team	Car	1	2	3	4	5	6	7	8	9	10	11	12	Pos	Points
2022	RTR Projects	KTM X-Bow GT4	OSC1; 1; 22	OSC1; 2; 16	RBR; 1; 17	RBR; 2; 13	ZAN; 1; 26†	ZAN; 2; 20	NÜR; 1 Ret	NÜR; 2; 16	SAC; 1 Ret	SAC; 2; 13			39th	7
2022	CV Performance Group	Mercedes-AMG GT4											HOC; 1; 20	HOC; 2; 17	39th	7
2023	BWT Mücke Motorsport	Mercedes-AMG GT4	OSC; 1; 13	OSC; 2; 18	ZAN; 1; 8	ZAN; 2; 12	NÜR; 1 Ret	NÜR; 2; 14	LAU; 1; 7	LAU; 2; 12	SAC; 1; 8	SAC; 2; 10	HOC; 1; 15	HOC; 2; 26	16th	47
2024	AVIA W&S Motorsport	Porsche 718 Cayman GT4 Clubsport	OSC; 1; 4	OSC; 2; 2	LAU; 1; 4	**LAU**; **2**; 2	NOR; 1; 11	**NOR**; **2**; 1	NÜR; 1; 9	NÜR; 2; 3	RBR; 1; 1	**RBR**; **2**; 2	**HOC**; **1**; 2	HOC; 2; 4	1st	205

=== Complete GT4 European Series results ===
(key) (Races in bold indicate pole position) (Races in italics indicate fastest lap)

Year	Team	Car	Class	1	2	3	4	5	6	7	8	9	10	11	12	Pos	Points
2023	BWT Mücke Motorsport	Mercedes-AMG GT4	Silver	MNZ; 1	MNZ; 2	LEC; 1	LEC; 2	SPA; 1; 12	SPA; 2; 20	MIS; 1	MIS; 2	HOC; 1	HOC; 2	CAT; 1	CAT; 2	37th	2
